= Victorian Soccer League =

- Founded: 1912; 114 years ago (Note: The first division was founded in 1909 as Victoria Amateur League, before it formed the Victorian Soccer League in 1912.)
- Folded: 1957; 69 years ago
- Country: Australia
- State: Victoria
- Domestic cup: Dockerty Cup

The Victorian Soccer League was an Australian soccer league based in Victoria that was founded in 1912 and administered by Football Victoria. It consisted of up to four divisions, through multiple structure changes to the league. The league folded in 1957 after the introduction of the Victorian State League.

== History ==
After the Victorian Amateur League and Victorian Junior League folded after its first three league seasons of soccer in Victoria, in 1912 two divisions were introduced under the Victorian Soccer League following the formation of five new clubs in the state; Birmingham Victoria, Footscray United, Moorabbin, Melbourne Thistle, Sunshine. Williamstown were the inaugural champions of the league in 1912 and went back-to-back as renamed Yarraville in 1913. In 1914, the second division was split into two groups.

== Champions ==
| Season | Division 1 | | Division 2 | | Division 3 | | Division 4 |
|---|---|---|---|---|---|---|---|
| 1912 | Williamstown | | Preston | | — | | — |
| 1913 | Yarraville | | Preston | | — | | — |
| Season | Division 1 | | Division 2A | Division 2B | Division 3 | | Division 4 |
| 1914 | Melbourne Thistle | | Sandringham | Footscray Thistle | — | | — |
| Season | Division 1A | Division 1B | Division 2 | | Division 3 | | Division 4 |
| 1915 | Albert Park | Melbourne Thistle | Spotswood A | | — | | — |
| Season | Division 1 | | Division 2 | | Division 3 | | Division 4 |
| 1916–1918 | No competition played due to World War I | | | | | | |
| 1919–1920 | Not played | | | | | | |
| 1921 | Windsor | | Brunswick | | — | | — |
| 1922 | Northumberland & Durham United | | Sandringham | | — | | — |
| 1923 | St Kilda | | Spotswood | | — | | — |
| Season | Division 1 | | Division 2A | Division 2B | Division 3 | | Division 4 |
| 1924 | Footscray Thistle | | Naval Depot | Melbourne Welsh | — | | — |
| Season | Division 1 | | Division 2 | | Division 3 | | Division 4 |
| 1925 | Melbourne Thistle | | Northumberland & Durham United | | Essendon City | | Box Hill |
| 1926 | Footscray Thistle | | Albert Park | | Box Hill | | Heidelberg |
| 1927–1928 | Not played | | | | | | |
| 1929 | Footscray Thistle | | Royal Caledonians | | Coburg | | Albert Park |
| 1930 | Footscray Thistle | | Collingwood | | South Yarra | | Middle Park |
| 1931 | Brunswick | | Box Hill United | | Melbourne Hakoah | | Spotswood B |
| 1932 | Footscray Thistle | | Melbourne Hakoah | | Heidelberg | | Windsor |
| 1933 | Royal Caledonians | | St Kilda | | Footscray United | | — |
| 1934 | Melbourne Hakoah | | South Melbourne | | Navy | | — |
| 1935 | Melbourne Hakoah | | Moreland | | Nettlefolds | | — |
| 1936 | Moreland | | Nobels | | Melbourne Manx | | — |
| 1937 | Moreland | | Nobels | | — | | — |
| 1938 | Melbourne Hakoah | | Footscray Thistle | | — | | — |
| 1939 | Prahran City | | South Melbourne United | | — | | — |
| 1940 | Nobels | | South Yarra | | — | | — |
| 1941 | Moreland | | Navy | | — | | — |
| 1942 | Prahran City | | — | | — | | — |
| 1943 | Moreland-Hakoah | | — | | — | | — |
| 1944 | Prahran City | | — | | — | | — |
| 1945 | Prahran City | | — | | — | | — |
| Season | Division 1 | | Division 2 North | Division 2 South | Division 3 | | Division 4 |
| 1946 | Moreland-Hakoah | | Coburg | Park Rangers | — | | — |
| Season | Division 1 | | Division 2 | | Division 3 | | Division 4 |
| 1947 | Sunshine United | | — | | — | | — |
| 1948 | Box Hill | | Bradford Cotton Mills | | University of Melbourne | | — |
| 1949 | Brighton | | Sandringham City | | George Cross | | — |
| Season | Division 1 | | Division 2 | | Division 3 North | Division 3 South | Division 4 |
| 1950 | Sunshine United | | Western Suburbs | | Fifers | J.U.S.T. | — |
| Season | Division 1 | | Division 2 | | Division 3 | | Division 4 |
| 1951 | Yallourn | | J.U.S.T. | | International Harvester | | Polonia |
| 1952 | Juventus | | Moreland | | Polonia | | Maccabi |
| 1953 | Juventus | | South Yarra | | Maccabi | | Slavia |
| 1954 | Juventus | | George Cross | | Slavia | | Wilhelmina |
| 1955 | Juventus | | Slavia | | Wilhelmina | | — |
| 1956 | Juventus | | Wilhelmina | | Preston | | — |
| 1957 | J.U.S.T. | | George Cross | | Yarra Park | | — |
