= 1912 in Victorian soccer =

Football Victoria
- Season: 1912; 114 years ago

The 1912 Victorian soccer season was the fourth competitive season of soccer in the Australian state of Victoria, under association with the governing body of Football Victoria. The season consisted of the fourth installment of the Dockerty Cup, and two premiership leagues then known as 'Division 1' and 'Division 2'. Division 1 was the first season of the reformed 'Amateur League', which is presently recognized as being the fourth season of first tier Victorian state soccer that is now formally known as the National Premier Leagues Victoria. Division 2 was introduced as the second tier of Victorian state soccer that is now formally known as the National Premier Leagues Victoria 2.

== Overview ==
=== Dockerty Cup ===
The fourth tournament of the Dockerty Cup saw the first occasion in which a Metropolitan Melbourne team played against a regional Victorian team in the Grand final. Melbourne based Yarraville defeated regional club Wonthaggi Rangers 3–0 in the final, marking Yarraville's first occurrence in the club's history to have achieved a double in both winning the highest premiership league and the cup in the same season. The lead up to the final as of 2020 remains unknown.

=== Premiership season ===
The premiership season saw an abundance of change, first with the rebranding of the 'Victorian Amateur League' becoming the 'Victorian Division 1', and for the first time in Football Victoria history, the establishment of its first ever second-tier competition, the 'Victorian Division 2'. Division 1 grew from Division 2 to Division 1 for its first season, but became effective in the 1913 season, but relegation from Division 1 to Division 2 was effective immediately.

At the conclusion of the 1911 season, Division 1 teams Williamstown changed its name to 'Yarraville', and South Melbourne also changed its name, renaming as 'Albert Park'. The league grew from seven teams to eleven with four new clubs being established, consisting of Birmingham Victoria, Footscray United, Melbourne Thistle and Sunshine. The reformed Yarraville won its first premiership under its new name (second as a club) after a difficult season in which all but one team did not play the required twenty matches that they were supposed to. Fitzroy and newly established Sunshine, both of whom only played fifteen matches became the first teams in history to be relegated. The season's conclusion also saw the folding of its second team, foundation club Carlton United being the most successful at the time, having been tier one league premiers and Dockerty Cup winners on two occasions each.

The results of the first season of the Victorian Division 2 are still being confirmed as of 2020, with only one known team being documented as having competed. It is believed that the newly established Preston were the premiers and would feature in the completely documented 1913 season.

== League Tables ==
=== Victorian Division 1 ===
Victorian Division 1
- Season: 1912
- Premiers: Yarraville (2nd title)
- Relegated: Fitzroy; Sunshine
- Goals: 368

Pos	Team	Pld	W	D	L	GF	GA	GD	Pts	Qualification or relegation
1	Yarraville	19	15	2	2	73	22	+51	32	1912 Division 1 Premiers
2	Burns	17	12	1	4	45	20	+25	25	
3	Carlton United	19	12	1	6	41	18	+23	25	Disbanded at end of season
4	St Kilda	17	11	2	4	42	20	+22	24	
5	Albert Park	19	9	6	4	46	29	+17	24	
6	Birmingham Victoria	17	8	1	8	25	23	+2	17	
7	Prahran	20	8	1	11	29	42	−13	17	
8	Melbourne Thistle	17	5	3	9	19	27	−8	13	
9	Footscray United	18	3	2	13	14	36	−22	8	
10	Fitzroy	15	2	0	13	17	44	−27	4	Relegated to Division 2
11	Sunshine	15	1	1	13	17	66	−49	3	Relegated to Division 2

Source: Records show that there is a goal difference error as well as a matches won error, in which twenty-one goals conceded were not recorded to the appropriate team(s) and one win was not recorded to the appropriate team
Rules for classification: 1) points; 2) goal difference; 3) number of goals scored.

=== Victoria Division 2 ===
Victorian Division 2
- Season: 1912
- Premiers: Preston (1st title)

While there is no complete ladder of the Victorian Division 2 in 1912, it is believed that Preston were the premiers and would feature in the completely documented 1913 season.

== Representative team ==
The following is a list of matches played by the representative team in 1912.

17 July 1912	Victoria (Victoria (state))	8–1	Tasmania	Melbourne, Australia
	Church (x5); Forbes (x2); Brown	Report	Pratt	Stadium: Melbourne Cricket Ground; Referee: W. Beach
