= 1909 Victorian Amateur League =

1st season of the Victorian Amateur League

Victorian Amateur League
- Season: 1909
- Dates: 8 May – 10 July 1909
- Matches: 30
- Goals: 150 (5 per match)
- Biggest home win: St Kilda 10–0 Williamstown (12 June 1909)
- Biggest away win: Fitzroy 0–9 Carlton United (17 July 1909)
- Highest scoring: Melbourne United 2–9 Williamstown (22 May 1909)
- Longest winning run: 8 matches Carlton United
- Longest unbeaten run: 10 matches Carlton United
- Longest winless run: 7 matches Prahran City
- Longest losing run: 7 matches Prahran City

The 1909 Victorian Amateur League was the first season of league soccer in Victoria. It began on 8 May 1909 and ended on 10 July 1909.

== Teams ==
Six teams competed in the league.

- Carlton United
- Fitzroy
- Melbourne United
- Prahran City
- St Kilda
- Williamstown

== Season overview ==
Carlton United lead the league undefeated after their first four matches. On 12 June, the match between Carlton United and Fitzroy was won by Carlton United in accordance to the final table, though a final result was never published. The top two Carlton United and St Kilda played on 26 June, where Carlton United won 5–1 to lead the league with 14 points, leaving second-placed St Kilda with 12 points with two rounds left. The season finished with Carlton United as champions and was undefeated throughout the entire season with nine wins and one draw; with bottom-placed Prahran City being the only team to take points off Carlton United all season.

== League table ==
Pos	Team	Pld	W	D	L	GF	GA	GD	Pts
1	Carlton United (C)	10	9	1	0	40	4	+36	19
2	St Kilda	10	7	0	3	40	17	+23	14
3	Melbourne United	10	4	0	6	23	34	−11	8
4	Williamstown	10	3	1	6	22	32	−10	7
5	Fitzroy	10	3	1	6	14	34	−20	7
6	Prahran City	10	2	1	7	11	29	−18	5

Source: OzFootball
Rules for classification: 1) points; 2) goal difference; 3) number of goals scored.
(C) Champions

== Results ==
Home \ Away	CAR	FIT	MEL	PRA	STK	WIL
Carlton United	—	W–L	6–0	0–0	5–1	4–1
Fitzroy	0–9	—	0–4	3–2	0–8	3–0
Melbourne United	0–3	2–4	—	7–2	3–1	2–9
Prahran City	0–4	3–0	1–2	—	0–2	3–0
St Kilda	2–6	3–1	5–2	5–0	—	10–0
Williamstown	0–3	3–3	3–1	6–0	0–3	—

Source: OzFootball
Legend: Blue = home team win; Yellow = draw; Red = away team win.
