= 1920 in Victorian soccer =

Football Victoria
- Season: 1920; 106 years ago

The 1920 Victorian soccer season was the ninth competitive season of soccer in the Australian state of Victoria, under association with the governing body of Football Victoria. Only two conferences of the 'Victorian Division 1' were contested, which as of 2021 season is recognized as the NPL. The calendar season saw the ninth installment of the Dockerty Cup, but for the first time in its history the competition was abandoned shortly before the grand final, in which Albert Park was to verse Northumberland and Durham United.

== Overview ==
Following the 1919 season, Football Victoria and its clubs were still recovering from the effects of World War I. Division 1 grew from eight teams to twelve, with the return of Burns and St Kilda, along with the debuts of newly established clubs of Melbourne Welsh and Osborne House. As a result of twelve teams confirming their commitment for the season, the league was split into two conferences with a final series determining the champions. The series consisted of the premiers and runners up of the two conferences, with Northumberland and Durham United defeating St Kilda 2–0 in the grand final, being the first occasion in which a runner up team were to be crowned champions. This feat would be one of three first time occasions in the history of the league. The other two occasions consisted of the fact that a team finished undefeated but would not become premiers, with Osborne House playing less than half of the season, but won all four of its matches. The third first time occasion was Windsor becoming the first team to have a point deduction. Windsor would have been Conference B premiers but were penalized four points which resulted them in finishing third.

== Ladders ==
=== Division 1A ===
Victorian Division 1A
- Season: 1920; 106 years ago
- Premiers: St Kilda (1st title)
- Matches: 30
- Goals: 100 (3.33 per match)

Pos	Team	Pld	W	D	L	GF	GA	GD	Pts	Qualification or relegation
1	St Kilda	10	9	0	1	29	7	+22	18	1920 Division 1A Premiers
2	Northumberland and Durham United	10	6	2	2	25	8	+17	14	Qualified for the 1920 Division 1 Finals Series
3	Footscray Thistle	10	5	3	2	19	10	+9	13	
4	Albert Park	10	3	3	4	17	17	0	9	
5	Preston	10	2	2	6	8	19	−11	6	
6	St David's	10	0	0	10	2	37	−35	0	Relegated to Division 2

Source: Records show that there is a goal difference error, in which two goals scored were not recorded to the appropriate team(s)
Rules for classification: 1) points; 2) goal difference; 3) number of goals scored.

=== Division 1B ===
Victorian Division 1B
- Season: 1920; 106 years ago
- Premiers: Melbourne Thistle (3rd title)
- Matches: 24
- Goals: 80 (3.33 per match)

Pos	Team	Pld	W	D	L	GF	GA	GD	Pts	Qualification or relegation
1	Melbourne Thistle	9	4	3	2	12	10	+2	11	1919 Division 1B Premiers
2	Spotswood	9	4	2	3	12	18	−6	10	Qualified for the 1920 Division 1 Finals Series
3	Windsor	9	6	1	2	29	7	+22	13	
4	Osborne House	4	4	0	0	13	2	+11	8	Disbanded at end of season
5	Burns	8	1	2	5	7	21	−14	4	Disbanded at end of season
6	Melbourne Welsh	9	1	0	8	6	22	−16	2	Relegated to Division 2

Source: Records show that there is a goal difference error, in which one goal conceded was not recorded to the appropriate team
Rules for classification: 1) points; 2) goal difference; 3) number of goals scored.
