= 1915 in Victorian soccer =

Football Victoria
- Season: 1915

The 1915 Victorian soccer season was the seventh competitive season of soccer in the Australian state of Victoria, under association with the governing body of Football Victoria.

It would be the last season of soccer prior to what be a three-year hiatus of soccer due to World War I in which approximately ninety percent of registered players were enlisted in the Australian Defence Force prior to the 1916 season, with at least forty percent of the players registering in April during the season.

Two leagues were contested, being 'Victorian Division 1' and 'Victorian Division 2' that is now (as of 2020 season) recognized as the NPL & NPL 2 respectively. The calendar season also saw the seventh tournament of the Dockerty Cup, in which Melbourne Thistle were crowned winners.

== Overview ==
There was no relegation at the conclusion of the 1914 season, with three more clubs joining the newly reformed first division that had been split into two sections (conferences). The three debutante clubs consisted of Sandringham who had been promoted from division two, along with the reformed Footscray Thistle, and temporary military sporting team H.M.A.S. Cerberus. Section A consisted of six teams, whereas Section B consisted of seven. A finals series was played between the premiers and runner's up of the two sections to determine the state champions, in which Melbourne Thistle of Section B defeated Albert Park of section A 1–0 to become champions.

It is believed that the second division continued into the 1915 season but not in a section form, but of a single league form. As of May 2020, the official table is incomplete, however it is known that at least four clubs competed in what is now known as the National Premier Leagues Victoria 2. These clubs consisted of the 1914 runner's up Hawthorn, along with debutante clubs Brunswick, Cambrian United, and Windsor. The league premiership team remains unknown, and the division is believed to have recommenced in 1921.

== League Tables ==
=== Division 1A ===
Victorian Division 1A
- Season: 1915
- Premiers: Albert Park (1st title)
- Matches: 30
- Goals: 91 (3.03 per match)

Pos	Team	Pld	W	D	L	GF	GA	GD	Pts	Qualification or relegation
1	Albert Park	10	7	3	0	24	5	+19	17	Qualified for the 1915 Division 1 Finals Series
2	Northumberland and Durham United	10	6	2	2	26	5	+21	14	Qualified for the 1915 Division 1 Finals Series
3	Yarraville	10	4	2	4	17	22	−5	10	Disbanded at end of season
4	Spotswood	10	3	3	4	9	13	−4	9	
5	Footscray Thistle	10	3	3	4	9	15	−6	9	
6	H.M.A.S. Cerberus	10	0	1	9	6	31	−25	1	Disbanded at end of season

Rules for classification: 1) points; 2) goal difference; 3) number of goals scored.

=== Division 1B ===
Victorian Division 1
- Season: 1915
- Premiers: Melbourne Thistle (2nd title)
- Matches: 42
- Goals: 105 (2.5 per match)

Pos	Team	Pld	W	D	L	GF	GA	GD	Pts	Qualification or relegation
1	Melbourne Thistle (C)	12	10	1	1	22	7	+15	21	Qualified for the 1915 Division 1 Finals Series
2	St Kilda	12	8	1	3	26	12	+14	17	Qualified for the 1915 Division 1 Finals Series and withdrew at end of season
3	Burns	12	6	3	3	13	10	+3	15	Withdrew at end of season
4	Birmingham Victoria	12	5	2	5	18	18	0	12	Disbanded at end of season
5	Prahran City	12	6	0	6	15	20	−5	12	Withdrew at end of season
6	Preston	12	2	0	10	7	20	−13	4	
7	Sandringham	12	1	1	10	4	18	−14	3	Disbanded at end of season

Rules for classification: 1) points; 2) goal difference; 3) number of goals scored.
(C) Champions

=== Division 2 ===
Victorian Division 2
- Season: 1915
- Premiers: Unknown

While there is no ladder for Division 2 as of May 2020, it is believed that at least eight clubs competed. Windsor is known to have finished third, followed by Hawthorn in fourth, with Brunswick finishing fifth. It is unknown which unknown clubs finished sixth and seventh but it is believed that Cambrian United finished eighth. The premiership and wooden spoon teams are unknown, as well as if a final series was contested. It is known that Windsor was promoted to Division 1 for the 1919 season.
