= 1914 in Victorian soccer =

Football Victoria
- Season: 1914

The 1914 Victorian soccer season was the sixth competitive season of soccer in the Australian state of Victoria, under association with the governing body of Football Victoria. The season consisted of two leagues, being 'Victorian Division 1' and 'Victorian Division 2'. The calendar season also saw the sixth tournament of the Dockerty Cup, in which Melbourne Thistle were crowned winners.

== Overview ==
At the conclusion of the 1913 season in division 1, Footscray Thistle withdrew from competitive soccer. This left the league with only nine teams after the planned promotion of the first and second placed teams on the division 2 ladder, being Preston and Spotswood. Footscray United changed their name to Northumberland & Durham United.

Division 2 was split into two sections, with only Hawthorn remaining in the division from the 1913 season. Along with the promotions of Preston and Spotswood; Fitzroy, Moorabbin and Sunshine all folded at the season's conclusion. Newly formed Sandringham joined the league and were premiers in both sections in which they were promoted, with Hawthorn being the runners−up in both sections also but were not promoted.

== League Tables ==
=== Division 1 ===
Victorian Division 1
- Season: 1914
- Premiers: Melbourne Thistle (1st title)
- Matches: 90
- Goals: 275 (3.06 per match)

Pos	Team	Pld	W	D	L	GF	GA	GD	Pts	Qualification or relegation
1	Melbourne Thistle	18	11	5	2	34	12	+22	27	1914 Division 1 Premiers
2	Birmingham Victoria	18	11	2	5	46	31	+15	24	
3	St Kilda	18	9	4	5	39	17	+22	22	
4	Yarraville	18	9	4	5	34	30	+4	22	
5	Spotswood	18	7	6	5	19	19	0	20	
6	Burns	18	7	4	7	30	24	+6	18	
7	Northumberland and Durham United	18	7	2	9	27	32	−5	16	
8	Albert Park	18	6	4	8	13	23	−10	16	
9	Preston	18	3	6	9	20	37	−17	12	
10	Prahran City	18	1	1	16	13	50	−37	3	

Rules for classification: 1) points; 2) goal difference; 3) number of goals scored.
