= 1909 in Australian soccer =

The 1909 season was the 26th season of regional competitive soccer in Australia. The Anglo-Australian Football Association introduced the Victorian Amateur League in the 1909 season.

== League competitions ==
Federation	Competition	Grand Final			Regular Season		
Federation	Competition	Champions	Score	Runners-up	Winners	Runners-up	Third place
Northern District British Football Association	Northern NSW Football League	Adamstown Rosebud	Unknown				
New South Wales British Football Association	Sydney Metropolitan First Division	Pyrmont Rangers	Unknown		Pyrmont Rangers	Rozelle	Unknown
Queensland British Football Association	Brisbane Area League	Unknown			Wellingtons	Eskgroves	Unknown
South Australian British Football Association	South Australia Division One	Not played			Hindmarsh	Cambridge	Adelaide
Anglo-Australian Football Association	Victorian Amateur League	Not played			Carlton United	St Kilda	Melbourne United
Western Australian Soccer Football Association	Western Australia Division One	Not played			Training College	Claremont	City United

== Cup competitions ==
Federation	Competition	Winners	Runners-up	Venue	Result
Northern District British Football Association	Ellis Cup	Adamstown Rosebud (7/6)	Merewether Advance (0/3)	–	3–2
New South Wales British Football Association	Gardiner Challenge Cup	Adamstown Rosebud (1/0)	Pyrmont District (2/3)	–	3–0 (R)
South Australian British Football Association	Federation Cup	Hindmarsh (2/1)	Sturt (0/1)	–	4–1
Anglo-Australian Football Association	Dockerty Cup	Carlton United (1/0)	St Kilda (0/1)	–	2–1

(Note: figures in parentheses display the club's competition record as winners/runners-up.)

== See also ==
- Soccer in Australia
