= 1910 in Australian soccer =

The 1910 season was the 27th season of regional competitive soccer in Australia.

== League competitions ==
Federation	Competition	Grand Final			Regular Season		
Federation	Competition	Champions	Score	Runners-up	Winners	Runners-up	Third place
Northern District British Football Association	Northern NSW Football League	Adamstown Rosebud	Unknown		Adamstown Rosebud	Adamstown Rosebud B	Unknown
New South Wales British Football Association	Sydney Metropolitan First Division	Glebe	Unknown		Glebe	Rozelle	Balmain
Queensland British Football Association	Brisbane Area League	Unknown			Dinmore Bush Rats	Eskgroves	Unknown
South Australian British Football Association	South Australia Division One	Not played			Cambridge	Port Adelaide	South Adelaide
Anglo-Australian Football Association	Victorian Amateur League	Not played			Carlton United	St Kilda	Prahran
Western Australian Soccer Football Association	Western Australia Division One	Not played			Claremont	City United	Rangers

== Cup competitions ==
Federation	Competition	Winners	Runners-up	Venue	Result
Northern District British Football Association	Ellis Cup	Adamstown Rosebud (8/6)	Merewether Advance (0/4)	–	2–0
New South Wales British Football Association	Gardiner Challenge Cup	HMS Powerful (1/0)	Helensburgh (0/1)	–	2–0
South Australian British Football Association	South Australia Federation Cup	Cambridge (2/0)	South Adelaide (0/1)	–	Unknown
Anglo-Australian Football Association	Dockerty Cup	Carlton United (2/0)	Prahran (0/1)	–	1–0

(Note: figures in parentheses display the club's competition record as winners/runners-up.)

== See also ==
- Soccer in Australia
