= Billy Cook (footballer, born 1940) =

Australian soccer player

Personal information
- Date of birth: 26 June 1940
- Place of birth: Galston, East Ayrshire, Scotland
- Date of death: 2 July 2017 (aged 77)
- Position: Defender

Youth career
- Galston Amateurs
- Ardrossan Winton Rovers

Senior career*
Years	Team	Apps	(Gls)
1959–1961	Kilmarnock	10	(0)
1963–1969	Slavia Melbourne		

International career
1965–1967	Australia	7	(0)
- * Club domestic league appearances and goals

Billy Cook (26 June 1940 – 2 July 2017) was a footballer who played seven times for the Australia national association football team.

== Playing career ==
=== Club career ===
Cook played his youth football for Galston Amateurs and Ardrossan Winton Rovers before signing with Kilmarnock in 1959. He played ten matches for Kilmarnock before moving to Australia to play for Melbourne team Slavia.

=== International career ===
Cook represented Scotland once at under-14 level and twice at under-15 level.

While playing at Slavia Cook came to the attention of the Australian selectors. Between 1965 and 1967 he played in seven full internationals for Australia, including two against Scotland, his country of birth.

He also played for the Victorian state team on several occasions.

== Personal life ==
Cook died on 2 July 2017, aged 77.

== Honours ==
Slavia Melbourne

- Australia Cup: 1963
- Victoria State League: runner-up 1966
- Dockerty Cup: 1964, 1965, 1967; runner-up 1966
- Victoria Ampol Cup: 1967
