= 1911 in Australian soccer =

The 1911 season was the 28th season of regional competitive soccer in Australia. During this year in 1911, the "Commonwealth Football Association"; the first national governing body of soccer in Australia was formed on 21 December 1911, though no national league was formed by a national governing body until 1977.

== League competitions ==
Federation	Competition	Grand Final			Regular Season		
Federation	Competition	Champions	Score	Runners-up	Winners	Runners-up	Third place
Northern District British Football Association	Northern NSW Football League	Merewether Advance; Wallsend Mezeppas	Unknown				
New South Wales British Football Association	Sydney Metropolitan First Division	Balmain	Unknown		Balmain	Granville	Navy
Queensland British Football Association	Brisbane Area League	Unknown			Bulimba Rangers	Wellingtons	Unknown
South Australian British Football Association	South Australia Division One	Not played			Port Adelaide	Unknown	
Anglo-Australian Football Association	Victorian Amateur League	Not played			Williamstown	Carlton United	Burns
Western Australian Soccer Football Association	Western Australia Division One	Not played			Rangers	Austral	Claremont

== Cup competitions ==
Federation	Competition	Winners	Runners-up	Venue	Result
Northern District British Football Association	Ellis Cup	Cessnock	Unknown	–	Unknown
New South Wales British Football Association	Gardiner Challenge Cup	Balmain (4/0)	HMS Powerful (1/1)	–	2–1
South Australian British Football Association	South Australia Federation Cup	Cambridge (3/0)	Port Adelaide (0/2)	–	2–0
Anglo-Australian Football Association	Dockerty Cup	St Kilda (1/1)	Williamstown (0/1)	–	4–2

(Note: figures in parentheses display the club's competition record as winners/runners-up.)

== See also ==
- Soccer in Australia
