= Soccer in Victoria (state) =

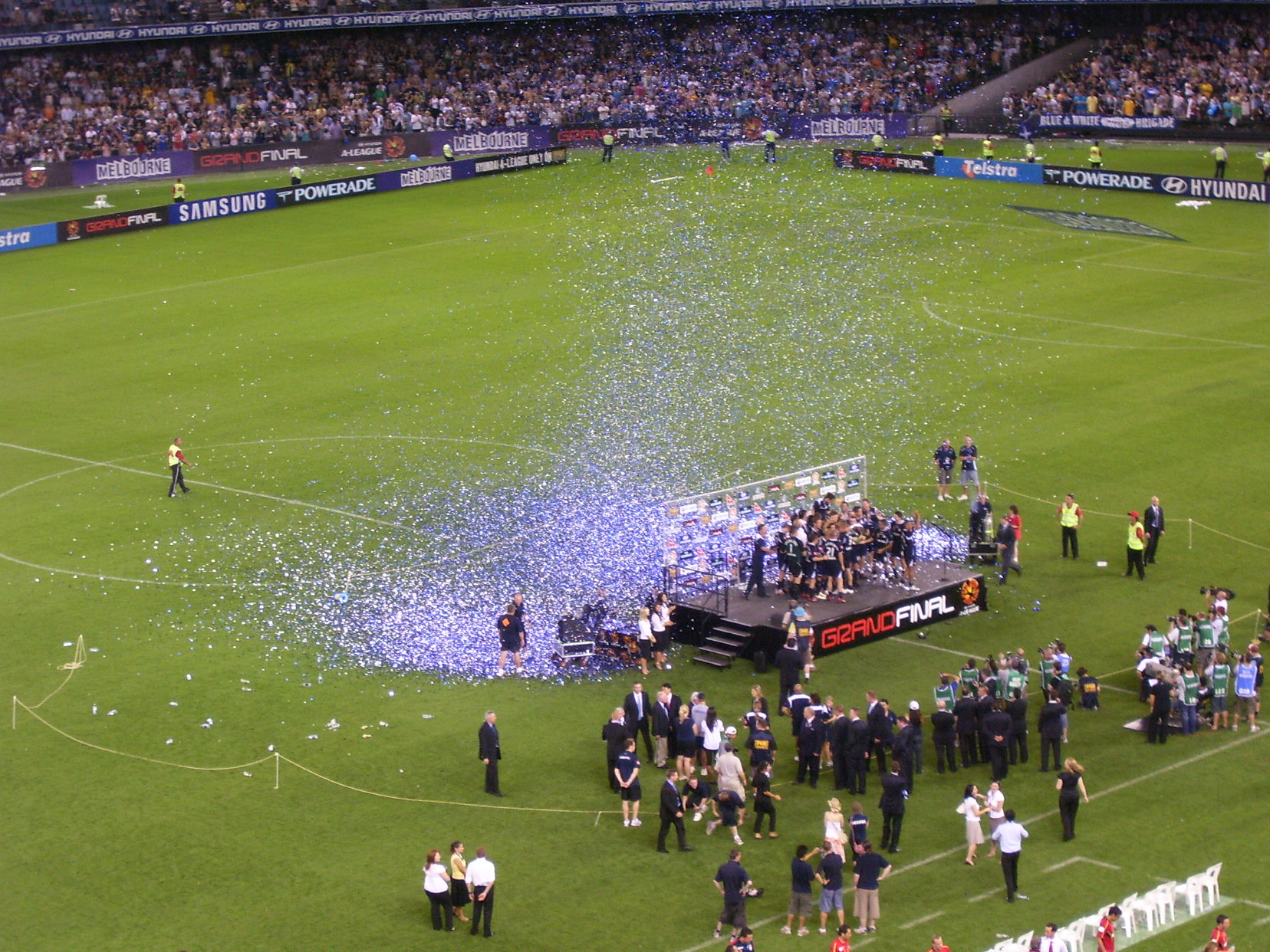
- Melbourne Victory celebrating 2007 A-League Grand Final win at Docklands Stadium
- Country: Australia
- Governing body: Football Victoria
- Representative team(s): State team
- First played: 1883 in Melbourne
- Registered players: 243,956 (2023)

Club competitions
- League: Men's competition National Premier Leagues Victoria Men's Victorian Premier League Men's Victorian State League Men's; Women's competition National Premier Leagues Victoria Women's; Victorian Premier League Women's; Victorian State League Women's: Cups: Men's competition Dockerty Cup Women's competition Women's State Knockout Cup

Audience records
- Single match: 99,382 (2015) International Champions Cup, Manchester City v Real Madrid, Melbourne Cricket Ground

Soccer in the Australian state of Victoria is organised by Football Victoria (FV). FV is a member of the national Football Australia.

== National representation ==
Victoria is currently represented in the top-flight A-League Men by Melbourne Victory, Melbourne City. Victory and City also have associated teams in the A-League Women.

Many Victorian clubs competed in the now defunct National Soccer League (NSL), three of which, South Melbourne FC, Melbourne Knights and Brunswick Juventus became champions. Along with South Melbourne, Heidelberg United, Footscray JUST and Mooroolbark United were NSL foundation clubs. At various times the following Victorian sides also competed in the NSL: Preston Lions FC; Carlton SC; Gippsland Falcons (also known as Eastern Pride); Collingwood Warriors; Sunshine George Cross; and Green Gully.

== State league system ==
The highest state based league is the National Premier Leagues Victoria, which forms a division of the National Premier Leagues across each state of Australia. The winner of which enters a national play-off series known as the Australian Championship against the winners of other NPL divisions and includes foundation clubs. The league below that is the two divisions of the Victorian Premier Leagues Victoria. Below that, Victorian State Leagues (7 divisions) are geographically divided by North/West and South/East conferences.

=== Men's system ===
Level	Total clubs	League(s) / division(s)	
1	14	National Premier Leagues Victoria Men's; 14 clubs – 3 relegations	
2	14	Victorian Premier League Men's 1; 14 clubs – 3 promotions, 3 relegations	
3	14	Victorian Premier League Men's 2; 14 clubs – 3 promotions, 3 relegations	
4	24	Victorian State League Men's 1 North-West; 12 clubs – 1.5 promotions, 2 relegations	Victorian State League Men's 1 South-East; 12 clubs – 1.5 promotions, 2 relegations
5	24	Victorian State League Men's 2 North-West; 12 clubs – 2.5 promotions, 2 relegations	Victorian State League Men's 2 South-East; 12 clubs – 2.5 promotions, 2 relegations
6	24	Victorian State League Men's 3 North-West; 12 clubs – 2.5 promotions, 2 relegations	Victorian State League Men's 3 South-East; 12 clubs – 2.5 promotions, 2 relegations
7	24	Victorian State League Men's 4 North-West; 12 clubs – 2.5 promotions, 2 relegations	Victorian State League Men's 4 South-East; 12 clubs – 2.5 promotions, 2 relegations
8	24	Victorian State League Men's 5 North-West; 12 clubs – 2.5 promotions, 2 relegations	Victorian State League Men's 5 South-East; 12 clubs – 2.5 promotions, 2 relegations
9	24	Victorian State League Men's 6 North-West; 12 clubs – 2.5 promotions, 2 relegations	Victorian State League Men's 6 South-East; 12 clubs – 2.5 promotions, 2 relegations
10	24	Victorian State League Men's 7 North-West; 12 clubs – 2.5 promotions	Victorian State League Men's 7 South-East; 12 clubs – 2.5 promotions

=== Women's system ===
Level	Total clubs	League(s) / division(s)	
1	14	National Premier Leagues Victoria Women's; 14 clubs – 2 relegations	
2	14	Victorian Premier League Women's; 12 clubs – 2 promotions, 2 relegations	
3	20	Victorian State League Women's 1 North-West; 10 clubs – 2 promotions, 2 relegations	Victorian State League Women's 1 South-East; 10 clubs – 2 promotions, 2 relegations
4	20	Victorian State League Women's 2 North-West; 10 clubs – 2 promotions, 2 relegations	Victorian State League Women's 2 South-East; 10 clubs – 2 promotions, 2 relegations
5	20	Victorian State League Women's 3 North-West; 10 clubs – 2 promotions, 2 relegations	Victorian State League Women's 3 South-East; 10 clubs – 2 promotions, 2 relegations
6	20	Victorian State League Women's 4 North-West; 10 clubs – 2 promotions, 2 relegations	Victorian State League Women's 4 South-East; 10 clubs – 2 promotions, 2 relegations
7	20	Victorian State League Women's 5 North-West; 10 clubs – 2 promotions, 2 relegations	Victorian State League Women's 5 South-East; 10 clubs – 2 promotions, 2 relegations
8	20	Victorian State League Women's 6 North-West; 10 clubs – 2 promotions, 2 relegations	Victorian State League Women's 6 South-East; 10 clubs – 2 promotions, 2 relegations
9	20	Victorian State League Women's 7 North-West; 10 clubs – 2 promotions, 2 relegations	Victorian State League Women's 7 South-East; 10 clubs – 2 promotions, 2 relegations
10	20	Victorian State League Women's 8 North-West; 10 clubs – 2 promotions	Victorian State League Women's 8 South-East; 10 clubs – 2 promotions

== Cup and shield competitions ==
=== State wide ===
The Dockerty Cup, a knockout cup competition for Victorian clubs, commenced in 1909. After World War I it ran consecutively from 1919 until 1996 when it went into recess until 2010 except for one season in 2004. The Cup competition was revived in 2011 and eventually returned to the traditional Dockerty Cup title in 2014. The Dockerty Cup is used to qualify Victorian clubs, with the exception of A-League clubs which already automatically qualify, for the national FFA Cup.

=== FV Community Shield ===
The Football Victoria Community Shield is the annual soccer match held since 2015 between the winners of the National Premier Leagues Victoria and the Dockerty Cup in the previous season.

=== Regional ===
- The Geelong Community Cup is an annual pre-season soccer tournament held in Geelong since 1981.

== Honours ==
Honours since reorganisation with NPL in 2014.

Year	Victoria League Champions	Victoria League Premiers	Dockerty Cup Winners	Community Shield Winners
2014	South Melbourne	South Melbourne	Melbourne Knights	N/A
2015	Bentleigh Greens	South Melbourne	South Melbourne	South Melbourne
2016	South Melbourne	Bentleigh Greens	Bentleigh Greens	Bentleigh Greens
2017	Bentleigh Greens	Heidelberg United	Heidelberg United	Bentleigh Greens
2018	Heidelberg United	Heidelberg United	Bentleigh Greens	Heidelberg United
2019	Bentleigh Greens	Heidelberg United	Hume City	Bentleigh Greens
2020	Cancelled due to the COVID-19 pandemic in Australia			Bentleigh Greens
2021	Not Held (COVID-19)	Oakleigh Cannons	Avondale FC	Not Held
2022	Oakleigh Cannons	South Melbourne	Bentleigh Greens	Not Held
2023	Avondale FC	Avondale FC	Oakleigh Cannons	Oakleigh Cannons
2024	Oakleigh Cannons	South Melbourne	South Melbourne	Avondale FC
2025	Heidelberg United	Avondale FC	South Melbourne	South Melbourne

== See also ==
- Football Victoria
- Soccer in Geelong
