= 1919 in Victorian soccer =

Football Victoria
- Season: 1919; 107 years ago

The 1919 Victorian soccer season was the eighth competitive season of soccer in the Australian state of Victoria, under association with the governing body of Football Victoria. It would be the first season of soccer following a three-year hiatus due to World War I in which approximately ninety percent of registered players were enlisted in the Australian Defence Force prior to the 1916 season. Only 'Victorian Division 1' was contested. The calendar season also saw the eighth tournament of the Dockerty Cup, in which Footscray Thistle were crowned winners after defeating the newly established Windsor 2–0.

== Overview ==
Following the effects of World War I, four clubs disbanded from Division 1 at the conclusion of the 1915 season, and at least three clubs in Division 2 also disbanded. Burns, St Kilda and Prahran City from Division 1 all survived the economic effects of the hiatus but did not return immediately for 1919. Eight clubs competed in Division 1, with six clubs continuing from 1915 along with the debut of St David's and the default promotion of Windsor from Division 2. It is believed that there was no final series in this season.

== Division 1 ==
Victorian Division 1
- Season: 1919
- Premiers: Northumberland and Durham United (1st title)
- Matches: 27
- Goals: 91 (3.37 per match)

Pos	Team	Pld	W	D	L	GF	GA	GD	Pts	Qualification or relegation
1	Northumberland and Durham United	7	6	1	0	26	13	+13	13	1919 Division 1 Premiers
2	Footscray Thistle	7	6	0	1	18	6	+12	12	
3	Windsor	7	3	3	1	12	9	+3	9	
4	Albert Park	7	3	0	4	9	12	−3	6	
5	Melbourne Thistle	7	2	2	3	7	10	−3	6	
6	Preston	7	2	1	4	5	13	−8	5	
7	Spotswood	7	1	2	4	10	13	−3	4	
8	St David's	7	0	1	6	5	23	−18	1	

Source: Records show that there is a goal difference error, in which seven goals scored were not recorded to the appropriate team(s)
Rules for classification: 1) points; 2) goal difference; 3) number of goals scored.
