= 1910 in Victorian soccer =

Football Victoria
- Season: 1910; 116 years ago

The 1910 Victorian soccer season was the second competitive season of soccer in the Australian state of Victoria, under association with the governing body of Football Victoria. The season consisted of the second instalment of the Dockerty Cup, and two premiership leagues then known as the 'Amateur League' and 'Junior League'. This league season of the 'Amateur League' is recognized as being the second season of first tier Victorian state soccer that is now formally known as the National Premier Leagues Victoria, while the league season is also recognized as being the inaugural National Premier Leagues Victoria 2 season, being established as the 'Junior League'.

== Overview ==
=== Dockerty and Junior Knock-out Cups ===
The second instalment of the Dockerty Cup then known as the 'Challenge Cup', was won by Carlton United after defeating Prahran 1–0 in the grand final. The tournament consisted of only six of the seven Amateur League clubs, while the Junior League clubs competed in a separate knockout tournament where Yarra United would be the winners.

=== Premiership seasons ===
The premiership season saw the contesting of two leagues that are recognized as the first two tiers of Victorian soccer. The 'Amateur League' was contested for the second time in its history, which as of 2021 is now formally known as the National Premier Leagues Victoria, being recognized as the first tier league at the time. The season also saw the inaugural season of the 'Junior League' which as of 2021 is now formally known as the National Premier Leagues Victoria 2, being the recognized as the second tier league at the time.

The Amateur League was made up of six Melbourne based district teams from the 1909 season plus a seventh addition being 'South Melbourne'. It is unknown whether this particular 'South Melbourne' team was the same team that was meant to compete in the 1909 season, but shortly withdrew before the season's commencement. The season was extended by having the teams play each other twice, not once, resulting in twelve rounded season. The inaugural premiers Carlton United were crowned as premiers for a second time, being undefeated without drawing a match. The calendar year's conclusion saw the folding of its first club being Melbourne United and was replaced by 'Burns' going into the 1911 season.

== League tables ==
=== Victorian Amateur League ===
Victorian Amateur League
- Season: 1910
- Premiers: Carlton United (2nd title)
- Matches: 36
- Goals: 162 (4.5 per match)
- Biggest home win: Carlton United 8–0 Williamstown (28 May 1910); Melbourne United 9–1 South Melbourne (11 June 1910)
- Biggest away win: Fitzroy 1–6 St Kilda (14 May 1910); Melbourne United 0–5 Carlton United (13 August 1910)
- Highest scoring: Melbourne United 9–1 South Melbourne (11 June 1910)
- Longest winning run: 12 matches Carlton United
- Longest unbeaten run: 12 matches Carlton United
- Longest winless run: 12 matches South Melbourne
- Longest losing run: 6 matches South Melbourne

| Pos | Team | Pld | W | D | L | GF | GA | GD | Pts | Qualification or relegation |
|---|---|---|---|---|---|---|---|---|---|---|
| 1 | Carlton United | 12 | 12 | 0 | 0 | 46 | 6 | +40 | 24 | 1910 Amateur League Premiers |
| 2 | St Kilda | 12 | 9 | 1 | 2 | 30 | 13 | +17 | 19 | |
| 3 | Prahran | 12 | 6 | 2 | 4 | 29 | 19 | +10 | 14 | |
| 4 | Melbourne United | 12 | 4 | 3 | 5 | 23 | 17 | +6 | 11 | Disbanded at end of season |
| 5 | Williamstown | 12 | 2 | 3 | 7 | 11 | 26 | −15 | 7 | |
| 6 | Fitzroy | 12 | 2 | 2 | 8 | 9 | 31 | −22 | 6 | |
| 7 | South Melbourne | 12 | 0 | 3 | 9 | 14 | 49 | −35 | 3 | |

Source: Records show that there is a goal difference error, in which one goal conceded was not recorded to the appropriate team
Rules for classification: 1) points; 2) goal difference; 3) number of goals scored.
