= 1913 in Victorian soccer =

Football Victoria
- Season: 1913

The 1913 Victorian soccer season was the fifth competitive season of soccer in the Australian state of Victoria, under association with the governing body of Football Victoria. The season consisted of two leagues, being 'Victorian Division 1' and 'Victorian Division 2'. The calendar season also saw the fourth tournament of the Dockerty Cup, in which Yarraville FC were crowned winners are defeating St Kilda 4–3 in the grand final.

== Overview ==
At the conclusion of the 1912 season in division 1, newly formed club Footscray and inaugural club Carlton United both folded, leaving the division 1 with only seven teams after the planned relegation of the last two teams on the ladder being Fitzroy and Sunshine to the newly formed division 2. Footscray Thistle had been established sometime between late 1912 & early 1913 and were promoted directly into division 1, bypassing the newly formed division 2. The new division 2 was to consist of six clubs, four of which were to debut in the Victorian state league system plus the two relegated division 1 clubs. These four new clubs consisted of Hawthorn, Moorabbin, Preston and Spotswood. The top two finishing teams played off in a grand final to determine the league champions, whilst division 1 did not contest a finals series.

== League Tables ==
=== Division 1 ===
Victorian Division 1
- Season: 1913
- Premiers: Yarraville FC (3rd title)
- Matches: 56
- Goals: 211 (3.77 per match)

Pos	Team	Pld	W	D	L	GF	GA	GD	Pts	Qualification or relegation
1	Yarraville FC	14	12	1	1	33	5	+28	25	1913 Division 1 Premiers
2	Burns	14	10	4	0	41	13	+28	24	
3	Melbourne Thistle	14	8	2	4	33	16	+17	18	
4	St Kilda	14	6	2	6	41	31	+10	14	
5	Prahran City	14	4	3	7	20	32	−12	11	
6	Birmingham Victoria	14	5	1	8	19	36	−17	11	
7	Albert Park	14	2	3	9	15	32	−17	7	
8	Footscray United	14	1	0	13	9	36	−27	2	

Source: Records show that there is a goal difference error, in which eleven goals conceded were not recorded to the appropriate team(s)
Rules for classification: 1) points; 2) goal difference; 3) number of goals scored.

=== Division 2 ===
Victorian Division 2
- Season: 1913
- Champions: Preston (1st title)
- Premiers: Preston (2nd title)
- Matches: 30
- Goals: 174 (5.8 per match)

Pos	Team	Pld	W	D	L	GF	GA	GD	Pts	Qualification or relegation
1	Preston (C)	10	9	0	1	68	7	+61	18	Promoted to Division 1
2	Spotswood	10	9	0	1	40	5	+35	18	Promoted to Division 1
3	Sunshine	10	6	0	4	30	16	+14	12	Disbanded at end of season
4	Hawthorn	10	3	0	7	14	39	−25	6	
5	Moorabbin	10	2	1	7	15	28	−13	5	Disbanded at end of season
6	Fitzroy	10	0	1	9	7	79	−72	1	Disbanded at end of season

Rules for classification: 1) points; 2) goal difference; 3) number of goals scored.
(C) Champions
