= Harry Dockerty =

Pioneering soccer administrator

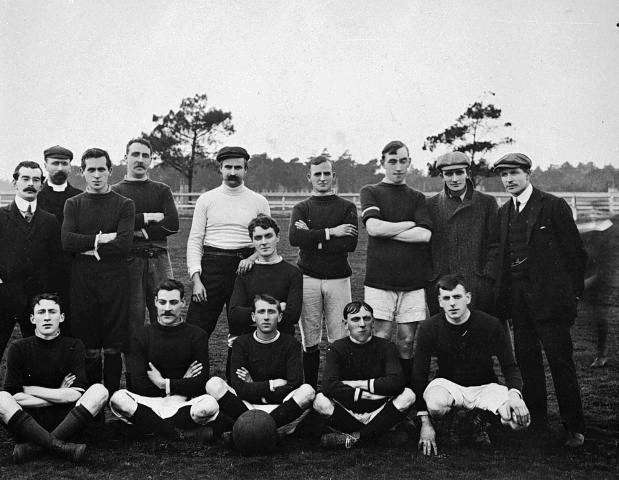
- Harry Dockerty in his playing days (standing third from the left).

Personal information
- Full name: Henry John Dockerty
- Date of birth: 1881
- Place of birth: Glasgow, Scotland
- Date of death: 1965 (aged 83–84)

Senior career*
Years	Team	Apps	(Gls)
- St Kilda SC
- * Club domestic league appearances and goals

Henry John Dockerty was an early pioneer of soccer in Victoria and significant figure in its development as a leading administrator.

Dockerty was born near Glasgow in 1881. There he trained as a tailor before moving to Melbourne in his early twenties. He became a successful businessman in the clothing trade of Melbourne shortly after.

In 1908, his advertisements in local Melbourne papers initiated the rebirth of football in Victoria.

Dockerty formed the Dockerty Challenge Cup and re-establishment of the Victoria's 'British Association' league in 1909 (as president) which re-ignited competition football after years of stagnation due to the economic depression during the late 1890s. Dockerty quickly become a leading administrator of the game in Victoria. Dockerty was vice-president of the Victorian Amateur Soccer Football Association from 1945 to 1955 and president from 1956 until 1962. He was the president of the newly formed Victorian Soccer Federation from 1962 until his death in 1965.

== Legacy ==
The Dockerty cup continues to be played in 2024.

== Awards ==
Dockerty was posthumously inducted into Football Australia Hall of Fame in 1999.
