= 1911 in Victorian soccer =

Football Victoria
- Season: 1911; 115 years ago

The 1911 Victorian soccer season was the third competitive season of soccer in the Australian state of Victoria, under association with the governing body of Football Victoria. The season consisted of the third instalment of the Dockerty Cup, and one premiership league then known as the 'Amateur League'. This league season is recognized as being the third season of first tier Victorian state soccer that is now formally known as the National Premier Leagues Victoria.

== Overview ==
=== Dockerty Cup ===
The third instalment of the Dockerty Cup then known as the 'Challenge Cup', was won by St Kilda after defeating Williamstown 4–2 in the grand final. The lead up to the final as of 2020 remains unknown.

=== Premiership season ===
The season consisted of one league made up of seven Melbourne based district teams, all of which had competed in the 1910 season. Williamstown were crowned as the premiers for the first time in their history, finishing two points (one win) ahead of 1909 & 1910 premiers, Carlton United. At the conclusion of the season there were two team name changes, being Williamstown changing its name to 'Yarraville', and South Melbourne renaming to 'Albert Park'.

== League Tables ==
=== Victorian Amateur League ===
Victorian Amateur League
- Season: 1911
- Premiers: Williamstown (1st title)
- Matches: 36
- Goals: 188 (5.22 per match)

Pos	Team	Pld	W	D	L	GF	GA	GD	Pts	Qualification or relegation
1	Williamstown	12	9	1	2	41	17	+24	19	1911 Amateur League Premiers
2	Carlton United	12	8	1	3	42	18	+24	17	
3	Burns	12	6	2	4	20	19	+1	14	
4	St Kilda	12	6	1	5	27	27	0	13	
5	Prahran	12	5	1	6	29	22	+7	11	
6	Fitzroy	12	2	1	9	19	47	−28	5	
7	South Melbourne	12	2	1	9	10	38	−28	5	

Rules for classification: 1) points; 2) goal difference; 3) number of goals scored.
