= 2018 Dockerty Cup =

2018 FFV Dockerty Cup
Tournament details
- Country: Australia
- Teams: 217

Final positions
- Champions: Bentleigh Greens
- Runners-up: Heidelberg United

The 2018 Dockerty Cup was a football (soccer) knockout-cup competition held between men's clubs in Victoria, Australia in 2018, the annual edition of the Dockerty Cup. Victorian soccer clubs from the 5 State League Divisions, regional, metros and masters leagues - plus the 12 Clubs from the National Premier Leagues Victoria - competed for the Dockerty Cup trophy.

The competition also served as Qualifying Rounds for the 2018 FFA Cup. In addition to the two Victorian A-League clubs, and Heidelberg United as 2017 National Premier Leagues champions, the four Preliminary Round 7 winners qualified for the final rounds of the 2018 FFA Cup, entering the Round of 32.

== Format ==
| Round | Clubs remaining | Winners from previous round | New entries this round | Main Match Dates |
|---|---|---|---|---|
| Qualifying Round | 217 | none | 66 | 10–17 February |
| Round 1 | 187 | 36 | 59 | 23–25 February |
| Round 2 | 141 | 48 | 36 | 2–6 March |
| Round 3 | 97 | 40 | 24 | 8–11 March |
| Round 4 | 65 | 33 | 31 | 17 March–2 April |
| Round 5 | 33 | 32 | none | 11–24 April |
| Round 6 | 17 | 16 | none | 1–9 May |
| Round 7 | 9 | 8 | none | 23–30 May |
| Play-off | 5 | 4 | 1 | 20 June |
| Semi-Finals | 4 | 4 | none | 26–27 June |
| Final | 2 | 2 | none | 11 July |

== Prize fund ==
The prize fund is detailed below.

| Round | No. of Clubs receive fund | Prize fund |
|---|---|---|
| Semi-finalists or Playoff Loser | 3 | $2,500 |
| Runner-up | 1 | $5,000 |
| Champion | 1 | $10,000 |
| Total | | $22,500 |

== Preliminary rounds ==
Victorian clubs participated in the 2018 FFA Cup via the preliminary rounds. This was open to teams from the National Premier Leagues Victoria, Victorian State League divisions, regional and metros leagues. Teams were seeded in terms of which round they would enter based on their division in 2018. Heidelberg United did not participate in the Victorian qualifying rounds, as they had already qualified into the FFA Cup as 2017 National Premier Leagues champions.

The five qualifiers for the final rounds were:

FFA Cup Qualifiers
| Avondale (2) | Bentleigh Greens (2) | Northcote City (2) | Port Melbourne (2) |
2017 NPL champion
Heidelberg United (2)

== Play-off round ==
A total of two teams took part in this stage of the competition, with the match played on 20 June.

| Tie no | Home team (tier) | Score | Away team (tier) |
|---|---|---|---|
| 1 | Heidelberg United (2) | 3–2 | Avondale (2) |

== Semi finals ==
A total of four teams took part in this stage of the competition, with the matches played on 26 and 27 June.

| Tie no | Home team (tier) | Score | Away team (tier) |
|---|---|---|---|
| 1 | Port Melbourne (2) | 1–5 | Bentleigh Greens (2) |
| 2 | Northcote City (2) | 0–2 | Heidelberg United (2) |

== Final ==
| 11 July 2018 | Heidelberg United (2) | 0–2 | Bentleigh Greens (2) | Jack Edwards Reserve |
| 19:30 | | Report | Pace 2' (o.g.); Xydias 90+1' |
