= 2021 Dockerty Cup =

2021 FFV Dockerty Cup
Tournament details
- Country: Australia
- Teams: 210

Final positions
- Champions: Avondale FC

The 2021 Dockerty Cup was a football (soccer) knockout-cup competition held between men's clubs in Victoria, Australia in 2021, the annual edition of the Dockerty Cup. Victorian soccer clubs from the National Premier Leagues Victoria divisions, State League divisions, regional, metros and masters leagues competed for the Dockerty Cup trophy.

The competition also served as Qualifying Rounds for the 2021 FFA Cup. In addition to the three Victorian A-League clubs, the four Preliminary Round 7 winners qualified for the final rounds of the 2021 FFA Cup, entering at the Round of 32.

The cup was won by Avondale FC, their first title.

== Format ==
Round	Clubs remaining	Winners from previous round	New entries this round	Main Match Dates
Qualifying Round	210	none	55	20–21 Feb
Round 1	183	28	48	27 Feb
Round 2	145	38	24	6–7 Mar
Round 3	114	31	69	12–15 Mar
Round 4	64	50	14	2–5 Apr
Round 5	32	32	none	27 Apr–22 Jun
Round 6	16	16	none	25 May–29 Jun
Round 7	8	8	none	6–7 Jul
Semi-Finals	4	4	none	3–4 Aug
Final	2	2	none	5 Dec

== Preliminary rounds ==
Victorian clubs participated in the 2021 FFA Cup via the preliminary rounds. This was open to teams from the NPL, NPL2, NPL3, State League divisions, regional and metros leagues. Teams were seeded in terms of which round they would enter based on their division in 2021.

The four qualifiers for the final rounds were:

FFA Cup Qualifiers
Avondale FC (2)	Hume City (2)	Port Melbourne (2)	South Melbourne (2)

== Semi finals ==
A total of four teams took part in this stage of the competition, with the matches played in August. As a new rule for the semi-finals and final, a fifth substitution was allowed if the game went to extra time, and a fourth substitution period.

Tie no	Home team (tier)	Score	Away team (tier)
1	Port Melbourne (2)	1–5	Avondale FC (2)
2	Hume City (2)	3–2	South Melbourne (2)

== Final ==
5 December 2021	Hume City	0–1	Avondale FC	CB Smith Reserve
1500		Report	Valentini 84'
