= Football in Victoria =

There are numerous codes of football in Victoria.

- For Australian rules football see Australian rules football in Victoria. The main organising body is the Victorian Football League.
- For Soccer see Soccer in Victoria. The main organising body is Football Federation Victoria.
- For Rugby league football see the main organising body, the Victorian Rugby League.
