= Flinders Naval Depot SC =

Flinders Naval Depot
- Full name: Flinders Naval Depot Soccer Club
- Nicknames: Flinders, The Navy
- Founded: 1924; 102 years ago as 'Navy'
- Dissolved: 1967; 59 years ago
- Ground: HMAS Cerberus, Crib Point

Flinders Naval Depot Soccer Club was an Australian military association football (soccer) club based at Crib Point, on the Mornington Peninsula of Victoria. Flinders played most of its known home matches at the HMAS Cerberus naval base, where it competed in the modern Football Victoria state league system sporadically after its founding in 1924, before competing regularly in 1950 till its folding in 1967.

The club is known for being the first military and Mornington Peninsula club to have been conference premiers and champions at the state's highest level in 1928, modernly recognized as the National Premier Leagues Victoria. Throughout its history, Flinders competed in the modern day first, second, third and fourth tier state leagues in its existence, and won the Dockerty Cup on three occasions.

== Honours ==
- Victorian State First Tier Finals

Champions (1): 1928

- Victorian State First Tier

Premiers (1): 1928 (South)
Runner's Up (1): 1929

- Victorian State Second Tier

Premiers (2): 1924 (Section A), 1941
Runner's Up (1): 1935

- Victorian State Third Tier

Premiers (2): 1927 (Section B), 1934
Runner's Up (2): 1950 (South), 1963 (South)

- Dockerty Cup

Winners (3): 1924, 1926, 1928
Runner's Up (1): 1927
