= Brunswick Zebras Football Club =

Australian soccer club

Brunswick Zebras
- Full name: Brunswick Zebras Football Club
- Nickname: Zebras
- Founded: 1948 as part of Juventus; 1964 as Brunswick United Juventus Juniors; 1997 Brunswick Zebras Juniors
- Ground: Sumner Park, Brunswick East
- Chairman: Carlo Carli
- League: Men: VSL 3 North-West; Women: VWSL 2 North
- 2026: Men: 6th Women: 5th
- Website: www.brunswickzebras.com.au
Home colours	Away colours

Brunswick Zebras Football Club is an Australian semi-professional soccer club that based in the Melbourne suburb of Brunswick East. The club fields both senior and reserves teams for men & women, and operates a junior academy under license from Football Victoria. For the 2019 Football Victoria season, the senior men finished seventh of the state league fourth division, and the senior women were premiers of the state league third division, both in the northern conferences. To date, the club have been national champions and premiers on one occasion each, Victorian state league premiers on eight occasions, state cup winners on six occasions, and winners of various lower state competitions throughout its existence.

The club was founded in 1948 as 'Juventus' by the Italian community of Melbourne and operates from the original clubrooms at Sumner Park. Under the name 'Brunswick Juventus', the club participated in the National Soccer League from 1984 to 1988, where they would be national champions in 1985 and southern conference premiers in 1986. The club again participated in the national competition for the 1993–94 and 1994–95 seasons under the names 'Brunswick Pumas' and 'Melbourne Zebras' respectively.

== History ==
=== Name history ===
Name	Period
Juventus	1948–1979
Brunswick United Juventus	1980–1993
Brunswick Pumas	1993–1994
Melbourne Zebras	1994–1995
Brunswick Zebras	1996–2021
Brunswick Juventus Junior	2021
Brunswick Zebras	2022-present

=== Establishment and early success (1949–1969) ===
The club was established by Melbourne's Italian community in 1948 as 'Juventus', named after the Italian club. The decision to name the club Juventus was due to the agreement of political neutrality by the founding members as the club was partly established remnants of several smaller clubs in Melbourne, including Savoia that was founded in the early 1930s, and is believed to have been Victoria's first Italian sporting club. The first competitive match was played on 16 April 1949, being the first round of the Victorian third tier league, that is now the Victorian State League Division 1 as of 2019. Juventus defeated Brighton SC 8-2 away, in what would be the beginning of a thirteen game winning streak that would ultimately help the club finish second and be promoted at the season's conclusion.

Brunswick Juventus became the dominant side in Victoria in the 1950s, winning six titles, including five consecutive titles from 1952 to 1956, and were arguably the club which ushered in the European migrant dominance of Victorian soccer which remains to the present. In the 1960s, while the club remained more than competitive, the rise of other migrant clubs, principally the Greek backed South Melbourne and the Yugoslav backed Footscray JUST, saw this dominance ended and the club waited until 1970 to add to its trophies.

=== Financial difficulties and mixed results (1970–1981) ===
The club largely struggled in the league during the 1970s due to financial difficulty after their 1970 championship and Dockerty Cup victory. With the exception of finishing third in 1977, the team would finish no higher than mid-table and narrowly avoided relegation multiple times. though there were would be another four Dockerty Cup wins during this time. As a result, the club decided not to pursue membership of the newly established National Soccer League in 1977, and would later change the club name from 'Juventus' to 'Brunswick United Juventus' in 1980. However, they generally continued to be called Brunswick Juventus.

=== Improved results and first national league stint (1982–1988) ===
With financial stability being regained in the early 1980s, the team finished third in both 1982 and 1983. When the national federation decided to implement a geographical conference system for the 1984 season to reduce travel expenses, Brunswick applied for the southern conference and were accepted, becoming the first Italian backed Melbourne club to compete at a national level. Brunswick would reach the finals in their debut season, but it would be the 1985 season that would see the club peak in its glory.

Brunswick finished second on the southern ladder but would defeat Heidelberg United, South Melbourne and Preston in the southern conference play-offs before eventually defeating Sydney City over two legs in the national grand final. In 1986 Brunswick finished first on the southern conference table, but consecutive losses to Adelaide City and Footscray JUST in the conference play-offs ended their season and was the last season in which they were to be finals competitive at national league level. Finishing eighth and thirteenth respectively in the 1987 and 1988 seasons saw Brunswick be relegated back to the Victorian state system.

=== Return to state league and second national league stint (1989–1996) ===
With two non-competitive seasons in the national league, the senior team commenced 1989 in the state league where they would finish second, and would repeat this feat in 1990. After enter the reform Victorian Premier League in 1991, its end first place finish at the highest state level in 1977, the club would break its twenty one year gap, finishing ahead of second-placed and fellow Italian backed club Bulleen by ten goals after being equal on thirty-eight points. Another competitive season in 1993 saw Brunswick be re-admitted to the national league for the 1993–94 season, changing its name to 'Brunswick Pumas' in accordance with federation's ruling of removing ethnicism from club names.

The return to the national wouldn't be as successful as the clubs first stint, with the pumas finishing second last. The season after, the club would change its name again for the fourth time in its history to 'Melbourne Zebras' in an attempt to gain a larger support base around Melbourne. On the field, the squad's performances slightly improved in finishing third last. However, with a stronger fan base not developing fast enough for the federations liking, and in a greater attempt to remove ethnicism from the sport as a whole, the federation decided to remove the Zebras and Heidelberg United from the 1995–96 season at late notice. Outraged, both clubs obtained court injunctions to prevent the league season going ahead. Eventually, the injunction was lifted in the Federal Court of Australia to allow the league to start, albeit several weeks late.

=== Club break off and re-establishment (1997–present) ===
Following dismissal from the national league, the club was allowed to return to the state league system's first tier league for a second time. It was at this time however that the club had developed dissension among its members, that resulted in the club being split into three groups. The 'Brunswick' group that contained the original Australian Business Number remained based at Sumner park, a tenancy that continues today. The 'Juventus' group would merge with fellow Italian backed clubs Box Hill, Bulleen, and Clayton to create 'Bulleen Inter Kings', taking with it the license to compete in the premier league for the 1997 season. The third group, referred to as the 'Zebras' group would merge with Italian backed Thomastown Devils to become 'Thomastown Zebras', to also compete in the premier league. In 2000, the two clubs would re-merge to create the 'Bulleen Zebras', and later the Moreland Zebras in 2009. Both Moreland and Whittlesea Ranges, now both playing in the National Premier Leagues Victoria 2, Victoria's second tier of state soccer, disputedly claim a lineage to the Brunswick Zebras Football Club and all of its achievements prior to the unfortunate events of 1996.

In 2003, under then president John Lewis, the club formed its first ever senior women's team. Coached by Paul Connolly, the team entered the Victorian state league division 3 north-west conference. In 2006, the club won its first senior women's premiership, with Connolly's team winning the division 3 north-west title ahead of second-placed Whittlesea Stallions. The team was promoted to division 2 north-west for the 2007 season.

In 2007, after a ten-year hiatus, the senior men's team were granted a license to compete in state tier seven league, then known as 'Provisional League Division 3' in the North-West conference. In 2008, the club renamed itself for a fifth time to its present name of 'Brunswick Zebras Football Club' and updated its emblem.

The 2011 season saw the club and the senior men win its first premiership in twenty years, finishing first in the seventh tier state league. With the club seeing itself as 'a sports club with a social purpose', the 2016 season saw the club have 500 registered players, 200 of which were female.

In 2019, one of the club's women's senior teams finished first in the state tier four league northern conference. It was the club's second senior women's premiership. As of 2019, the club is headed by politician Carlo Carli.

In 2021, the club announced that it was changing its name for a fifth time to 'Brunswick Juventus Junior Football Club'. Along with the name change, the club publicised a new logo which included the historic Zebra, in recognition of the name used from 1994 to 2020. It has since been reverted to Brunswick Zebras.

== Former managers ==
- (Northern Ireland) Paddy Sloan
- (Australia) Manfred Schaefer

== Honours ==
=== National ===
- National Soccer League Finals

Championships (1): 1985

- National Soccer League

Premierships (1): 1986 South
Runners-up (1): 1985 South

- National Soccer League Conference Finals

Championships (1): 1985 South

- National Youth League

Runners-up (1): 1985 South

=== State Men's ===
- Ampol Night Cup

Winners (1): 1959

- Dockerty Cup

Winners (6): 1960, 1970, 1971, 1972, 1977, 1987
Runners-up (7): 1952, 1957, 1958, 1969, 1980, 1990, 1993

- Pre Season Cup

Winners (1): 1958
Runners-up (2): 1959, 1977

- State League Cup

Winners (3): 1958, 1969, 1970

=== Victorian First Tier ===
- Victorian Soccer League

Premierships (5): 1952, 1953, 1954, 1955, 1956

- Victorian State League

Premierships (2): 1958, 1970
Runners-up (5): 1962, 1967, 1969, 1989, 1990

- Victorian Premier League

Premierships (1): 1991
Runners-up (1): 1992

=== Victorian Seventh Tier ===
- Victorian State League Division

Premierships (1): 2011 North-West

=== Metropolitan Leagues Men's ===
- Victorian Twelfth Tier

Premierships (1): 2018 North-West

- Victorian Thirteenth Tier

Premierships (1): 2017 North-West

- Victorian Thirteenth Tier Finals

Champions (1): 2017

- Victorian Sixteenth Tier

Runners-up (1): 2019 North-West

=== State Women's ===
- Victorian Women's Third Tier

Premierships (1): 2006 North-West

- Victorian Women's Fourth Tier

Premierships (1): 2019 North

- Victorian Women's Fifth Tier

Runners-up (1): 2010 North-West, 2013 North, 2018 East

== See also ==
- List of sports clubs inspired by others

Preceded by South Melbourne	NSL Champions; 1985	Succeeded by Adelaide City
