= 1909 in Victorian soccer =

Football Victoria
- Season: 1909; 117 years ago

The 1909 Victorian soccer season was the first competitive season of soccer in the Australian state of Victoria, under the association of the governing body, Football Victoria. The season consisted of one league made up of six district teams from Melbourne that were known as the 'Amateur League'. This league season is recognized as being the first season of first-tier Victorian state soccer that is now formally recognized as National Premier Leagues Victoria. Carlton United were crowned as the inaugural premiers. The calendar season also saw the commencement of the Dockerty Cup, in which Carlton United defeated St Kilda 2–1, making United the first club in the state's history to achieve both respective accolades in the same season.

== League establishment ==
As interest grew from what was referred to as the "British Association" sport, local businessman Harry Dockerty placed advertisements in local Victorian newspapers The Age and The Argus in mid-1908 to unite all local enthusiasts of association football (soccer). On 3 August 1908, the modern Victorian league system was established with the intention of commencing a competitive league in 1909. Along with a competitive league, a cup tournament was also established and was named the Challenge Cup, but was eventually renamed the Dockerty Cup. There was no league final series to determine the league champions, nor a league cup tournament involving teams from the upper side of the premiership ladder. The first final series of any kind implemented by Football Victoria was introduced in the 1913 season for the second tier league, with finals being introduced for the first division league in the 1915 season.

The league was scheduled to consist of eight local clubs from metropolitan Melbourne, being Albert Park, Carlton United, Fitzroy, Melbourne United, Prahran, South Melbourne, St Kilda and Williamstown, however only six of the clubs actually competed. In the recess between the last practice matches in September 1908 to the pre-season practice matches of April 1909, Albert Park was never mentioned in local media until early 1910, while it appears that South Melbourne was the second team to withdraw, despite playing practice matches only weeks before the season's commencement. In the following season of 1910, a club named South Melbourne that would later be renamed to Albert Park (and later Glenroy), competed from 1910 through to 1934. It is possible that this may be the same club or both the original Albert Park and South Melbourne clubs had merged, however this remains unknown. When a second division was established in 1910, a team under the name of Albert Park competed but lasted only a solitary season. It is unknown whether this particular Albert Park was the same one to appear in 1908 or if it was connected to the South Melbourne team that would later be renamed Albert Park.

Of the six clubs that competed, only Prahran still presently exists under the identity of Brighton Soccer Club. While Carlton United, Fitzroy, Melbourne United, St Kilda and Williamstown all eventually folded, Prahran amalgamated with Brighton prior to the 1988 season, where the club's senior male squad presently competes in the Victorian State League Division 3, the sixth tier of Victorian soccer.

== Overview ==
=== Dockerty Cup ===
The calendar season also saw the commencement of the Dockerty Cup, then known originally as the Challenge Cup, as the Federation's cup tournament. The first ever competitive match took place at the Gardens Reserve in Williamstown on 24 July 1909, the same venue as the first ever first tier league match, in which the home team Williamstown, were defeated 5-2 by St Kilda. In the grand final, league premiers Carlton United defeated St Kilda 2–1, making United the first club in the state's history to achieve both respective accolades in the same season.

=== Premiership season ===
The first ever competitive league match recognized by Football Victoria took place on 8 May 1909 at the Gardens Reserve in Williamstown. Hosted by Williamstown, St Kilda defeated the home team 3-0. The biggest win of the season was by St Kilda over Williamstown again, this time by ten goals finishing at 10-0 during the sixth round of the season on June 12 1909 at Middle Park. The inaugural league premiers, Carlton United, went the season undefeated, finishing ahead of St Kilda by five points being exactly two wins and one draw ahead.

== League Tables ==
=== 1909 Victorian Amateur League ===
Pos	Team	Pld	W	D	L	GF	GA	GD	Pts	
1	Carlton United	10	9	1	0	40	4	+36	19	1909 Amateur League Premiers
2	St Kilda	10	7	0	3	40	17	+23	14	
3	Melbourne United	10	4	0	6	23	34	−11	8	
4	Williamstown	10	3	1	6	22	32	−10	7	
5	Fitzroy	10	3	1	6	14	34	−20	7	
6	Prahran City	10	2	1	7	11	29	−18	5	

Rules for classification: 1) points; 2) goal difference; 3) number of goals scored.

== Representative team ==
The following is a list of matches played by the representative team in 1909.

27 March 1909	Victoria (Victoria (state))	2–1	(United Kingdom) HMS Powerful	Melbourne, Australia
		Report		Stadium: Middle Park

2 June 1909	Victoria (Victoria (state))	0–3	Western Australia	Melbourne, Australia
		Report	Robertson; Evans; Burt	Stadium: East Melbourne Cricket Ground; Referee: E. Masters; Assistant referees: H. Fletcher (Victoria); J. McLaughlin (Western Australia)
