= Melbourne United FC =

Former Anglo-Celtic-backed soccer club from Melbourne, Australia

Melbourne United
- Full name: Melbourne United Football Club
- Founded: 1909; 117 years ago
- Dissolved: 1910; 116 years ago
- Ground: Middle Park
- League: Victorian Amateur League

Melbourne United Football Club was an Anglo-Celtic-backed soccer club from Melbourne, Australia. Founded no later than early 1909 and presumably dissolved at the conclusion of the 1910 football season, the short lived club is known for being one of the six clubs to compete in the inaugural Victorian state tier one football league season of 1909, then known as the 'Amateur League'. Except for Williamstown, the five other clubs including United all used Middle Park in Albert Park as a home venue for the regular season and Dockerty Cup matches. The club's colours were dark blue and dark yellow for the 1909 season, and did not achieve any accolades throughout its existence.
