= FV Community Shield =

- Founded: February 2015; 11 years ago
- Region: Victoria
- Teams: 2
- Current champions: Heidelberg United FC (2 titles)
- Most championships: Bentleigh Greens (4 titles)

The Football Victoria Community Shield (formerly the Football Federation Victoria Community Shield) is the annual soccer match between the winners of the National Premier Leagues Victoria and the Dockerty Cup in the previous season. Formerly serving as a "curtain raiser" in February ahead of the start of the season, the 2026 edition between Dockerty Cup champions South Melbourne and NPL Victoria champions Heidelberg United took place within the season.

Organised by Football Victoria, the FV Community Shield also has a focus on raising proceeds for various charity and community-based initiatives. The 2015 inaugural edition partnered with World Vision's "One Goal" program, whilst the 2019 edition was held in support of the #SaveHakeem campaign, seeking to free refugee and Pascoe Vale FC player Hakeem al-Araibi from detention in Thailand.

== Men's event ==
=== History ===
The FFV Community Shield was first announced in January 2015. The first match was held that year in support of World Vision's One Goal program, whose aims are to leverage the power of football to tackle malnutrition in Asia and Australia.

=== Past winners ===
Year	NPL representative	Dockerty Cup representative	Score	Venue	Charity appeal
2015	South Melbourne	Melbourne Knights	2–1	Knights Stadium	One Goal
2016	Bentleigh Greens	South Melbourne	3–0	Kingston Heath Soccer Complex	Reagan Milstein Foundation
2017	South Melbourne	Bentleigh Greens	1–2	Kingston Heath Soccer Complex	Reagan Milstein Foundation
2018	Bentleigh Greens	Heidelberg United	1–4	Kingston Heath Soccer Complex	Reagan Milstein Foundation
2019	Heidelberg United	Bentleigh Greens	0–2	ABD Stadium	#SaveHakeem
2020	Bentleigh Greens	Hume City	0–0 (7–6 (p))	City Vista Reserve	Victorian Bushfire Relief
2021	Not held due to impacts associated with the COVID-19 pandemic in Australia.				
2022	Not held due to impacts associated with the COVID-19 pandemic in Australia.				
2023	Oakleigh Cannons	Bentleigh Greens	4–0	Kingston Heath Soccer Complex	Reagan Milstein Foundation
2024	Avondale	Oakleigh Cannons	2–1	Jack Edwards Reserve	
2025	Oakleigh Cannons	South Melbourne	0–1	The Home of the Matildas	
2026	Heidelberg United	South Melbourne	4–0	Olympic Village	

=== Records ===
- Most wins: 4, Bentleigh Greens
- Biggest win: 4–0 Oakleigh Cannons FC vs Bentleigh Greens 2023
- Most consecutive wins: 2, Bentleigh Greens SC 2016–2017, 2019–2020
- Most appearances: 6, Bentleigh Greens

== Women's event ==
=== History ===
A women's FFV Community Shield commenced in 2017, featuring the winner of the Team App Cup and the NPL Victoria Women competition.

=== Past winners ===
Year	previous NPL winner	previous Team App Cup winner	Score	Venue	Charity appeal
2017	Calder United	Heidelberg United	7–1	Olympic Village.	Reagan Milstein Foundation
2018	South Melbourne	Calder United	1–2	Kingston Heath Soccer Complex	Reagan Milstein Foundation
2019	Bulleen Lions	Calder United	1–3	Green Gully Reserve	#SaveHakeem
2020	Calder United	Bulleen Lions	5–0	City Vista Reserve	Victorian Bushfire Relief
2021	Not held due to impacts associated with the COVID-19 pandemic in Australia.				

=== Records ===
- Most wins:
- Biggest win:
- Most appearances in a final:
