= 2020 Football Victoria season =

Football Victoria
- Season: 2020

The 2020 season in Football Victoria refers to the competitions contested under the organisation of Football Victoria in 2020.

All NPL and grassroots competitions were suspended due to the impacts from the COVID-19 pandemic in Australia, effective 18 March, and were further extended. The season was only able to restart in a limited way for juniors in regional areas from September 24, whereas no football activities were able to take place in Metropolitan Melbourne. Preliminary plans for the resumption of competitions for the 2021 season were released in October 2020, confirming that the current season had effectively ended.

== League Tables ==
=== 2020 National Premier Leagues Victoria ===
National Premier Leagues Victoria
- Season: 2020
- Dates: 13 February to 15 March
- Champions: None
- Relegated: None
- Matches: 35
- Goals: 99 (2.83 per match)
- All statistics correct as of 15 March 2020.

The 2020 National Premier Leagues Victoria was the seventh season of the National Premier Leagues Victoria, the top tier of Victorian soccer, since its establishment in 2014. Bentleigh Greens were the defending champions from the previous season. Fourteen teams competed in the league – the top twelve teams from the previous season and two teams promoted from the National Premier Leagues Victoria 2 (Eastern Lions and St Albans Saints).

No Premier was declared.

In addition to this season being cancelled, the 2020 National Premier Leagues finals series was also cancelled (the NPL Premier normally qualifies for the national NPL finals series).

Pos	Team	Pld	W	D	L	GF	GA	GD	Pts
1	Hume City	5	5	0	0	11	3	+8	15
2	Oakleigh Cannons	5	3	1	1	11	6	+5	10
3	Dandenong Thunder	5	3	1	1	9	7	+2	10
4	Avondale	5	4	0	1	14	4	+10	9 (Note: Avondale were deducted 3 points for breach of regulations.)
5	Heidelberg United	5	3	0	2	10	6	+4	9
6	Port Melbourne	5	2	3	0	8	4	+4	9
7	St Albans Saints	5	2	3	0	7	3	+4	9
8	South Melbourne	5	1	3	1	7	7	0	6
9	Green Gully	5	2	0	3	7	9	−2	6
10	Bentleigh Greens	5	1	2	2	4	3	+1	5
11	Melbourne Knights	5	0	2	3	7	16	−9	2
12	Dandenong City	5	0	1	4	4	10	−6	1
13	Eastern Lions	5	0	1	4	2	12	−10	1
14	Altona Magic	5	0	1	4	2	13	−11	1

Source: sportstg.com
Rules for classification: 1) Points; 2) Goal difference; 3) Goals scored

=== 2020 National Premier Leagues Victoria 2 ===
The 2020 NPL Victoria 2 competition structure was changed from the previous year (which had been two conferences with 10 teams each), to a single group of 12 teams. No games were played.

=== 2020 National Premier Leagues Victoria 3 ===
The 2020 NPL Victoria 3 was originally scheduled to be the first season of the NPL Victoria 3, the third-tier of Victorian soccer. NPL Victoria 3 was created from the bottom halves of the East and West divisions of NPL Victoria 2 when the league was reorganised at the end of the 2019 season, with a single group of 12 teams. No games were played.

=== 2020 NPL Victoria Women ===
The highest tier domestic football competition in Victoria for women is the National Premier Leagues Victoria Women. This was originally scheduled to be the fifth season of the NPL format. No games were played.

== Cup Competitions ==
=== 2020 Dockerty Cup ===
Football Victoria soccer clubs commenced the competition for the Dockerty Cup. The preliminary rounds doubled as the Victorian qualifiers for the 2020 FFA Cup, but the competition was suspended and ultimately cancelled after the Third preliminary round.
