= Footscray Thistle FC =

Footscray Thistle
- Full name: Footscray Thistle Football Club
- Founded: 1913; 113 years ago
- Dissolved: 1940; 86 years ago

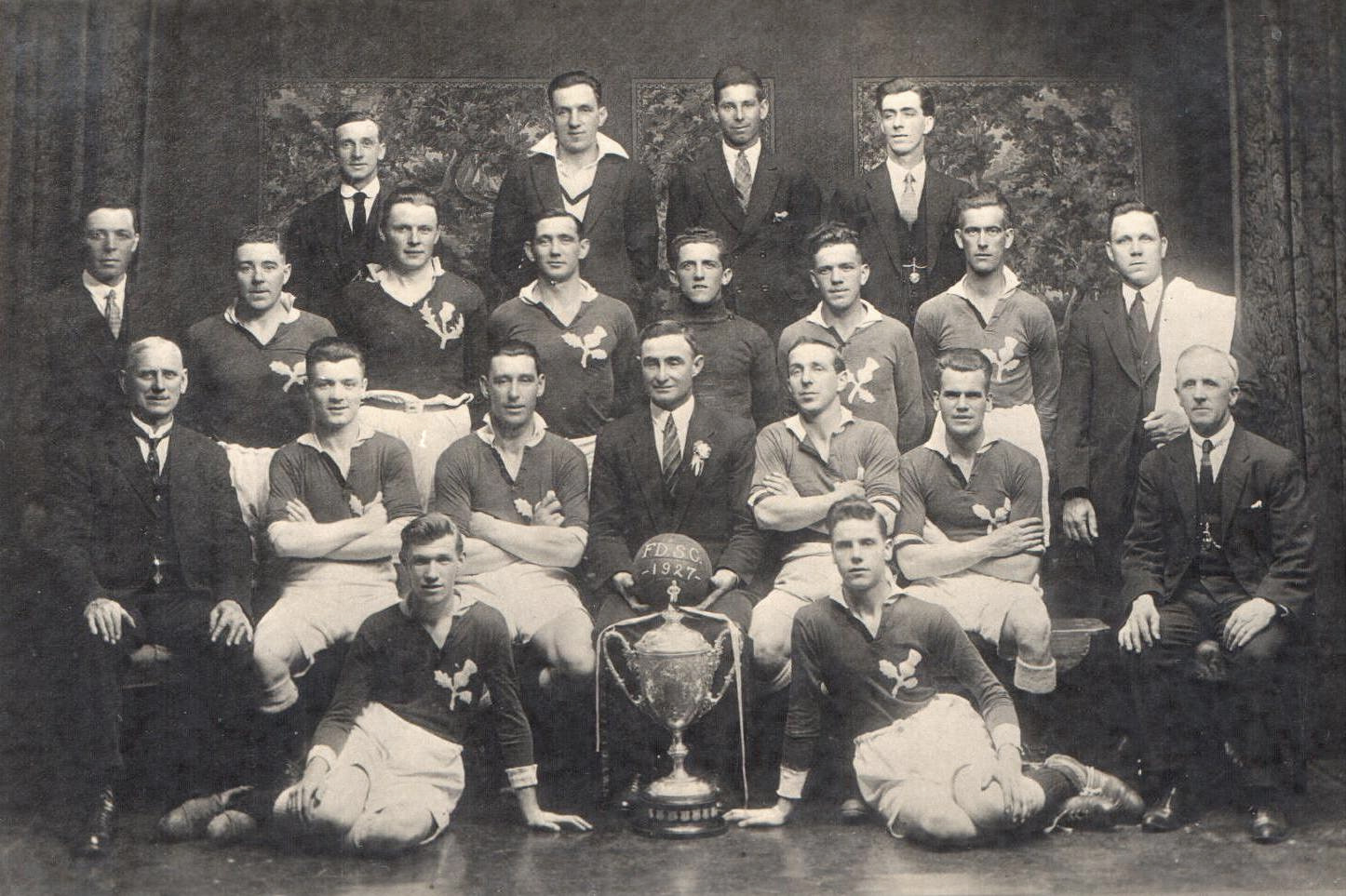
Footscray Thistle with the 1927 Dockerty Cup.

Footscray Thistle Football Club was an Anglo-Celtic backed association football (soccer) club from Footscray, a suburb of Melbourne, Australia.

The 1915 Victorian Soccer Football Association season appears to be its first in the Melbourne league competition.

In 1927, Thistle beat Navy 5-2 to win the Dockerty cup at the Melbourne Motordome.

Throughout its existence, the club participated in the Football Victoria state league system, where it spent twenty-two of its twenty-four seasons in the Victorian State First Tier league, now the National Premier Leagues Victoria.

As of the 2020 season, Footscray is still regarded as one of the most successful Victorian clubs, with five first tier premierships, one conference premiership one championship and four Dockerty Cups.

== Honours ==
- Victorian State First Tier

Premiers (5): 1924, 1926, 1928, 1929, 1932
Runner's Up (3): 1919, 1923, 1927

- Victorian State First Tier Conference

Premiers (1): 1930 (north)

- Victorian State Second Tier

Runner's Up (1): 1938

- Dockerty Cup

Premiers (4): 1919, 1927, 1930, 1932
Runner's Up (2): 1924, 1936
