= Slavia Melbourne SC =

The Slavia Melbourne Soccer Club is a defunct Australian association football (soccer) club that was based in Melbourne, Victoria. The club was founded in 1950 by Czech migrants and became a leading club in Australian football. Slavia competed in the Victorian State League from 1956 to 1970 and 1973 to 1980. Through its history the club went by a number of names, starting out as Slavia, then Port Melbourne Slavia, Essendon Slavia and finally Prahran Slavia.

The golden era of the club was in the 1960s where the club won many titles, most notably the Australian Cup in 1963. The club never won the Victorian State league, finishing Runner-Up on two occasions in 1966 and 1977. For the 1967–68 season, the club incredibly signed the former Czechoslovak national goalkeeper, Viliam Schrojf, who had starred with the national team in the 1962 World Cup (albeit was at fault for his role in losing the 1962 World Cup Final vs Brazil).

By the 1980s the club had fallen on hard times and in 1983 the club ceased to exist when it was taken over by the Chilean community, today known as the Laverton Park Soccer Club.

== Honours ==
=== National ===
- Australia Cup

Winners (1): 1963

=== State ===
- Ampol Cup

Winners (1): 1967

- Dockerty Cup

Winners (3): 1964, 1965, 1967
Runner's Up (1): 1966

- Victorian First Tier

Runner's Up (2): 1966, 1977

- Victorian Second Tier

Premierships (2): 1955, 1972

- Victorian Third Tier

Premierships (1): 1954

- Victorian Fourth Tier

Premierships (1): 1953
