= Windsor FC (Australia) =

Windsor
- Full name: Windsor Football Club
- Founded: 1915; 111 years ago 1932; 94 years ago (re-founded)
- Dissolved: 1934; 92 years ago
- League: Various leagues of Football Victoria
Home colours

Windsor Football Club was an Australian association football club founded in May 1915, and was based in the Melbourne suburb of Windsor wearing an all purple kit with a gold sash. The short lived club is known for its Victorian first tier champions in 1921, and for playing a charity friendly match in Geelong on 26 April 1920, against the crews of HMAS Platypus and its accompanying submarines. The club achieved two league championships, and reached the final of the Dockerty Cup twice, losing both times. The club was dormant for seven years (1925 to 1931) and resumed competitive fixtures in 1932. The club folded at the conclusion of the 1934 season alongside fellow tier one winner St Kilda and several other clubs. This club has no connection to the club of the same name that competed in the 1970 season of the Victorian state tier seven league.

== Honours ==
- Dockerty Cup
  - Runner's up (2): 1919, 1922
- Victorian First Tier
  - Champions (1): 1921
- Victorian Third Tier
  - Runner's up (1): 1933
- Victorian Fourth Tier
  - Champions (1): 1932
