= Fitzroy District FC =

Fitzroy
- Full name: Fitzroy District Football Club
- Founded: 1908; 118 years ago
- Dissolved: 1913; 113 years ago
- Ground: Middle Park

Fitzroy District Football Club (commonly referred to simply as Fitzroy) was an Anglo-Celtic-backed soccer club based in the inner-northern Melbourne suburbs of Fitzroy and Fitzroy North.

Founded no later than 26 September 1908 and dissolving at the conclusion of the 1913 season, the short lived club is known for being one of the six clubs to compete in the inaugural Victorian state tier one football league season of 1909, then known as the 'Amateur League'.

Except for Williamstown, the five other clubs including Fitzroy all used Middle Park stadium in Albert Park as a home venue for the regular season and Dockerty Cup matches. The club's colors were dark blue and black for the 1909 season, and did not achieve any accolades throughout its existence.
