= National Premier Leagues Victoria Men's =

- Organising body: Football Victoria
- Founded: 1908; 118 years ago
- First season: 1909 (as Victorian Amateur League); 2014 (as NPL Victoria)
- Country: Australia
- State: Victoria
- Number of clubs: 14
- Level on pyramid: 2
- Relegation to: Victorian Premier League
- Domestic cup(s): Australia Cup; Dockerty Cup; FV Community Shield
- Current champions: Avondale FC (2026)
- Current premiers: Oakleigh Cannons (2026)
- Most championships: South Melbourne (10 titles)
- Most premierships: Green Gully (4 titles)
- Website: nplvictoria.com.au
- Current: 2026 NPL Victoria

The National Premier Leagues Victoria (NPL Victoria or NPL VIC), is a semi-professional soccer league in Victoria, Australia. The league is a part of the National Premier Leagues, and is the highest level within the Victorian soccer league system, serving jointly as the second tier within the overall Australian pyramid.

Administered by Football Victoria, NPL Victoria is the latest iteration of first division competitions in the state. Historically known as the Victorian State League and later as the Victorian Premier League, the league was first founded in 1908 as the Victorian Amateur League and would soon become the Victorian First Division. It adopted its current branding in 2014, following Football Federation Australia's 2012 National Competition Review.

NPL Victoria is contested by 14 clubs. Running from February to September each year, the league sees teams play 26 regular season fixtures, once at home and once away against each other club. The first-placed team at the conclusion of the regular season is termed the "premier". The top six-placed clubs then play a knock-out finals series, with the winner becoming the "champion". As of the 2025 season, the three bottom-placed teams at the conclusion of the season are relegated to the division below, Victoria Premier League 1.

In the 2024 season, Football Victoria included a provision that relegation in the 2024 season would be suspended if a National Second Division commences in 2025; instead assigning two relegation spots in the 2025 season.

The league premier qualifies as Victoria's representative in the national finals series, whilst the champion plays against the Dockerty Cup winner in the FV Community Shield.

== History ==
The league commenced as the Victorian Soccer League in 1909 with Carlton United being the first champions. It has run continuously except for a three season postponement from 1916 to 1918 owing to World War I. After 1945 the league, like fellow state competitions around the country, received a massive boost in numbers and quality with the post-war influx of European migrants, whose dominance was established so effectively that no club which had won the title before 1952, Juventus' first title, has won one since.

Juventus would go on to dominate the league in the 1950s, winning six titles, including five in a row from 1952 to 1956. In 1958, after the Victorian Amateur Soccer Federation was formed, the league became known as the Victorian State League. From 1962 until 1976 the league was largely dominated by South Melbourne Hellas and Footscray JUST, which won 11 titles between them.

With creation of the National Soccer League (NSL) in 1977, the league gradually lost most of its stronger clubs, a trend that reached its peak between 1984 and 1986, when the NSL used a split conference system. After 1987, however, the league slowly started regaining clubs, firstly those discarded when the conference system experiment was abandoned and later when clubs became permanently relegated by the NSL to their respective state leagues. The dominant side during the years from 1977 to 2004 was Green Gully, who won six titles during this period, despite also missing the years 1984–1986 from being in the NSL.

In 1991 the league rebranded again to become the Victorian Premier League and the first finals to determine the champions were staged in 1992, won by the newly promoted North Geelong. Following the demise of the NSL in 2004, the remaining two Victorian NSL teams Melbourne Knights and South Melbourne were granted permission to play in the VPL season of 2005. The league received a major boost at the start of the 2005 season when Vodafone became major naming rights sponsors, with the competition being renamed the Vodafone Cup. The 2005 season initially saw crowds attending in record numbers to witness the return of old derbies such as that between South Melbourne and Heidelberg United, but with the formation of the A-League filling the void of a national domestic league, 2006 saw a sharp decline in attendances.

The end of the 2006 season also witnessed a controversial finish to the relegation battle. With three teams finishing on 30 points, Sunshine George Cross were relegated on goal difference. However, a post-season appeal to the tribunal on the grounds that Essendon Royals had fielded a suspended player (Ilcho Mladenovski in round 24) saw the Royals deducted a point and relegated. Ultimately, both clubs reprised their position in the following season's competition with the inclusion of the Australian Institute of Sport evening out the numbers to 16, and as the first part of reforms to the competition set to be brought about in 2008.

The Australian Institute of Sport experiment was largely derided by the local clubs, and after their removal from the competition in 2008, the league reverted to 12 teams and a Top 5 Finals-Series in 2009. However, the concept of a youth development squad was reintroduced in 2010 with the National Training Centre team playing in midweek fixtures throughout the season but not for competition points. In 2011 the team, mostly comprising players from the Melbourne Victory youth squad, was renamed Victorian Training Centre Football and was eligible to score competition points for its matches but ineligible to qualify for the finals series or be relegated.

On 15 September 2013, Victoria Police arrested up to ten people, including Southern Stars FC players David Obaze, Nick McKoy and Joe Woolley as well as the coach, Zaya Younan, for allegations of match fixing. They are expected to be charged with corrupting the outcome of betting.

In early 2013, it was announced that Victoria would join the National Premier Leagues, with the Victorian Premier League expected to be rebranded for the 2014 season. Although Football Federation Victoria's initial proposal was halted with the announcement of a deferral in November 2013 after several clubs objected to the process for selecting teams. However, by December 2013, a resolution was reached whereby Victorian teams would participate in the 2014 season.

== Competition format ==
NPL Victoria comprises 14 teams. The season is staged during the Australian winter, running from February to September. The league combines aspects of both the traditional European-style round-robin and Australian-style finals series within its competition format.

=== Regular season ===
The regular season consists of a double round-robin. Each club plays every other club twice, once at home and once away, for a total of 26 matches. Teams receive three points for a win, one point for a draw and no points for a loss. The clubs are ranked first based on the number of points acquired during the season. If two teams have an equal number of points, they are separated firstly by goal difference and then the number of goals scored, calculated across all matches. The Rules of Competition provide head-to-head aggregate and head-to-head away goals as further tiebreakers if necessary. The team ranked first at the end of the regular season is termed the premiers, and becomes Victoria's entry for the national NPL finals.

=== Finals series ===
At the conclusion of the regular season, the six highest-ranked clubs qualify for the (Victorian) finals series. The finals take place over three weeks, with teams entering the series based on their respective finishes in the regular season. The teams ranked 3–6 enter at the elimination finals stage. The third-ranked team plays the sixth-ranked team, whilst the fourth-ranked team plays the fifth-ranked one. The two winners of the elimination finals meet the teams ranked 1 and 2 in the semi-finals. The premier in the regular season plays the lower-ranked qualifier from the elimination finals, whilst the runner-up plays the higher-ranked qualifier. The finals conclude with the grand final, played between the two winners of the semi-finals. The winner of the grand final is crowned the champions. As all finals matches require a winner, they are all knock-out fixtures. If a draw occurs at the end of normal time, 30 minutes of extra time are played. A penalty shoot-out is played if the teams are still drawn.

=== Promotion and relegation ===
NPL Victoria also operates a system of promotion and relegation with the division immediately below, VPL 1. As of the 2025 season, the three bottom clubs at the conclusion of each season are automatically relegated. From VPL 1, the winners and runners-up are automatically promoted to NPL Victoria, with a third club promoted via a playoff between the clubs finishing 3rd through 6th for the season in that league.

== Current clubs ==
The following clubs competed in the 2026 NPL Victoria season.

Locations of 2026 NPL Victoria clubs within metropolitan Melbourne

Club	Location	Home ground	Capacity
Altona Magic	Altona North	Paisley Park	5,000
Avondale	Parkville	Avenger Park	2,500
Bentleigh Greens	Cheltenham	Kingston Heath Soccer Complex	3,300
Caroline Springs George Cross	Fraser Rise	City Vista Recreation Reserve	3,000
Dandenong City	Endeavour Hills	Frank Holohan Reserve	4,000
Dandenong Thunder	Dandenong South	George Andrews Reserve	5,000
Green Gully	Keilor Downs	Green Gully Reserve	10,000
Heidelberg United	Heidelberg West	Olympic Village	12,000
Hume City	Westmeadows	Nasiol Stadium	3,000
Melbourne City	Cranbourne East	City Football Academy	1,500
Oakleigh Cannons	Oakleigh	Jack Edwards Reserve	4,000
Preston Lions	Reservoir	B.T. Connor Reserve	9,000
South Melbourne	Albert Park	Lakeside Stadium	12,000
St Albans Saints	St Albans	Churchill Reserve	3,500

== NPL honours ==
=== 2014–2015 ===
The league ran through two divisions; the Premier Division and Division 1. The Premier Division was a single league season, whilst Division 1 separated by two zone leagues (East and West) and the winners qualifying for a Grand Final between the two Division 1 Premiers to determine the Champions.

Champions
Season	Premier Division	Division 1
2014	South Melbourne	Avondale
2015	Bentleigh Greens	Richmond

Premiers
Season	Premier Division	Division 1 East	Division 1 West
2015	South Melbourne	Richmond	Bulleen Lions

=== 2016–2019 ===
The leagues were renamed with the Premier Division becoming Division 1, and Division 1 becoming Division 2.

Champions
Season	Division 1	Division 2
2016	South Melbourne	Kingston City
2017	Bentleigh Greens	Dandenong Thunder
2018	Heidelberg United	Dandenong City
2019	Bentleigh Greens	St Albans Saints

Premiers
Season	Division 1	Division 2 East	Division 2 West
2016	Bentleigh Greens	Kingston City	St Albans Saints
2017	Heidelberg United	Dandenong Thunder	Northcote City
2018	Heidelberg United	Dandenong City	Altona Magic
2019	Heidelberg United	Eastern Lions	St Albans Saints

=== 2020–2023 ===
In 2020, a third division was added and the second division was no longer divided into two zones (East and West).

Champions
Season	Division 1	Division 2	Division 3
2020	Cancelled due to COVID-19 pandemic in Victoria		
2021	Cancelled due to COVID-19 pandemic in Victoria		
2022	Oakleigh Cannons	Moreland City	Preston Lions
2023	Avondale FC	Dandenong City	Caroline Springs George Cross

Premiers
Season	Division 1	Division 2	Division 3
2020	Cancelled due to COVID-19 pandemic in Victoria		
2021	Oakleigh Cannons (Note: Subsequent to the season cancellation, and as a result of a court challenge involving Avondale FC and Football Victoria, it was agreed that eight rounds of games from the 2022 NPL Season would also count towards the 2021 NPL league table, enabling sufficient matches to be played to "complete" the season, and be able to declare a Premier for 2021.)	Not awarded	
2022	South Melbourne	Moreland City	Preston Lions
2023	Avondale FC	Dandenong City	Caroline Springs George Cross

=== 2024–present ===
From 2024 onwards, the second and third divisions were moved from the NPL Victoria system to the Victorian Premier League system leaving only the top division of NPL Victoria.

Season	Champions	Premiers
2024	Oakleigh Cannons	South Melbourne
2025	Heidelberg United	Avondale FC
2026	Avondale FC	Oakleigh Cannons

=== NPL Finals series ===
Up to the 2019 season, one representative from each Member Federation participated in the NPL Championship, a knock-out competition to determine a national champion.

Year	Team	Result
2014	South Melbourne	Semi Finalist
2015	South Melbourne	Quarter Finalist
2016	Bentleigh Greens	Quarter Finalist
2017	Heidelberg United	Champions
2018	Heidelberg United	Semi Finalist
2019	Heidelberg United	Quarter Finalist
2020	Cancelled due to the COVID-19 pandemic in Australia.	

=== Australian Championship representation ===
From the 2025 season, the Premiers from each Member Federation participated in the Australian Championship. In addition, three Victorian teams currently in the NPL also participated, designated as Foundation Clubs.

Year	Team	Result
2025	Avondale FC	Quarter-Finals
2025	Heidelberg United	Semi-Finals
2025	Preston Lions	Group Stage
2025	South Melbourne	CHAMPIONS

2026	Avondale FC	Group Stage
2026	Oakleigh Cannons	
2026	Preston Lions	
2026	South Melbourne	

== Honours pre-NPL ==
Season	Champions	Runners-up	Conference Premiers	Conference Runners-up
1909	Carlton United	St Kilda	NA	
1910	Carlton United	St Kilda	NA	
1911	Williamstown	Carlton United	NA	
1912	Williamstown	Burns	NA	
1913	Yarraville (formerly Williamstown)	Burns	NA	
1914	Melbourne Thistle	Birmingham Victoria	NA	
1915	Melbourne Thistle	Albert Park	Conference A – Albert Park; Conference B – Melbourne Thistle	Conference A – Northumberland & Durham United; Conference B – St Kilda
1916–18	League cancelled due to World War I			
1919	Northumberland & Durham United	Footscray Thistle	NA	
1920	Northumberland & Durham United	St Kilda	Conference A – St Kilda; Conference B – Melbourne Thistle	Conference A – Northumberland & Durham United; Conference B – Spotswood
1921	Windsor	Northumberland & Durham United	NA	
1922	Northumberland & Durham United	Northcote	NA	
1923	St Kilda	Footscray Thistle	NA	
1924	Footscray Thistle	St Kilda	NA	
1925	Melbourne Thistle	Footscray Thistle	NA	
1926	Footscray Thistle	Preston	NA	
1927	Prahran City	Footscray Thistle	NA	
1928	Naval Depot	Footscray Thistle	Southern Conference – Naval Depot; Northern Conference – Footscray Thistle	Southern Conference – South Melbourne; Northern Conference – Preston
1929	Footscray Thistle	Naval Depot	NA	
1930	Footscray Thistle	Caledonians	NA	
1931	Brunswick	Caledonians	NA	
1932	Footscray Thistle	Royal Caledonians	NA	
1933	Royal Caledonians	South Yarra	NA	
1934	Hakoah	Royal Caledonians	NA	
1935	Hakoah	Royal Caledonians	NA	
1936	Moreland City	Caledonians	NA	
1937	Moreland City	Prahran City	NA	
1938	Hakoah	Northumberland & Durham United	NA	
1939	Prahran City	Nobels	NA	
1940	Nobels	South Melbourne United	NA	
1941	Moreland City	Prahran City	NA	
1942	Prahran City	Moreland Hakoah	NA	
1943	Moreland Hakoah	Prahran City	NA	
1944	Prahran City	Brighton	NA	
1945	Prahran City	Brighton	NA	
1946	Moreland City	Prahran City	NA	
1947	Sunshine United	Moreland City	Conference A – Moreland City; Conference B – Sunshine United	Conference A – Park Rangers; Conference B – Prahran City
1948	Box Hill United	Sunshine United	NA	
1949	Brighton	Park Rangers	NA	
1950	Sunshine United	Box Hill United	NA	
1951	Yallourn	Sunshine United	NA	
1952	Brunswick Juventus	Brighton	NA	
1953	Brunswick Juventus	Hakoah	NA	
1954	Brunswick Juventus	Hakoah	NA	
1955	Brunswick Juventus	Western Eagles	NA	
1956	Brunswick Juventus	Hakoah	NA	
1957	Footscray JUST	Moreland City	NA	
From 1958 the league was renamed State League from the previous Division One. A State League Cup was introduced as a Top 4 Finals series, which however did not determine the Champion of the season. Between 1962 and 1968 the top 4 teams qualified for the Australia Cup.
Season	Champions	Runners-up	State League Cup Top 4 Series Champions	State League Cup Runners-up
1958	Brunswick Juventus	Ringwood City	Brunswick Juventus	Ringwood City
1959	Ringwood City	Caroline Springs George Cross	Caroline Springs George Cross	Ringwood City
1960	Western Eagles	Caroline Springs George Cross	Western Eagles	Caroline Springs George Cross
1961	Western Eagles	Caroline Springs George Cross	Ringwood City	Caroline Springs George Cross
1962	South Melbourne	Brunswick Juventus	NA	
1963	Footscray JUST	Western Eagles	NA	
1964	South Melbourne	Caroline Springs George Cross	NA	
1965	South Melbourne	Caroline Springs George Cross	NA	
1966	South Melbourne	Prahran Slavia	NA	
1967	Melbourne Hungaria	Brunswick Juventus	NA	
1968	Melbourne Knights	Western Eagles	NA	
1969	Footscray JUST	Brunswick Juventus	Brunswick Juventus	Footscray JUST
1970	Brunswick Juventus	Melbourne Hungaria	Brunswick Juventus	Melbourne Hungaria
1971	Footscray JUST	South Melbourne	Melbourne Knights	South Melbourne
1972	South Melbourne	Caroline Springs George Cross	NA	
1973	Footscray JUST	Caroline Springs George Cross	Caroline Springs George Cross	Hakoah
1974	South Melbourne	Caroline Springs George Cross	Footscray JUST	Fitzroy United
1975	Fitzroy United	South Melbourne	Footscray JUST	Mooroolbark
1976	South Melbourne	Footscray JUST	Footscray JUST	South Melbourne
1977	Caroline Springs George Cross	Prahran Slavia	Caroline Springs George Cross	Prahran Slavia
1978	Melbourne Knights	Preston Lions	Melbourne Knights	Caroline Springs George Cross
1979	Melbourne Knights	Frankston City	Melbourne Knights	Preston Lions
1980	Preston Lions	Melbourne Knights	Melbourne Knights	Preston Lions
1981	Green Gully	Melbourne Knights	Melbourne Knights	Doveton
1982	Green Gully	Melbourne Knights	Green Gully	Morwell Falcons
1983	Green Gully	Melbourne Knights	Melbourne Knights	Green Gully
1984	Morwell Falcons	Western Eagles	Morwell Falcons	Western Eagles
1985	Croydon City	Morwell Falcons	Box Hill United	Morwell Falcons
1986	Croydon City	Frankston Pines	Croydon City	Frankston Pines
1987	Western Eagles	Green Gully	Green Gully	Western Eagles
1988	Heidelberg United	Croydon City	Croydon City	Green Gully
1989	Morwell Falcons	Brunswick Juventus	Morwell Falcons	St Albans Saints
1990	Heidelberg United	Brunswick Juventus	NA	
1991	Brunswick Juventus	Bulleen Lions	NA	
From 1992 the league was renamed the Victorian Premier League and Finals were introduced to determine the Champions.
Season	Champions	Runners-up	Premiers	Runners-up
1992	North Geelong Warriors	Brunswick Juventus	North Geelong Warriors	Bulleen Lions
1993	Bulleen Lions	Manningham United	Bulleen Lions	Manningham United
1994	Preston Lions	Port Melbourne Sharks	Preston Lions	Bulleen Lions
1995	Altona Magic	Bulleen Lions	Port Melbourne Sharks	Altona Magic
1996	Altona Magic	Heidelberg United	Altona Magic	Heidelberg United
1997	Altona Magic	Bulleen Zebras	Altona Magic	Bentleigh Greens
1998	Bulleen Zebras	St Albans Saints	St Albans Saints	Altona Magic
1999	Green Gully	Port Melbourne Sharks	Finals not held	
2000	Green Gully	Bentleigh Greens	Finals not held	
2001	Heidelberg United	Port Melbourne Sharks	Port Melbourne Sharks	Heidelberg United
2002	Preston Lions	Manningham United	Manningham United	Green Gully
2003	Green Gully	Frankston Pines	Preston Lions	Green Gully
2004	Bulleen Zebras	Altona Magic	Green Gully	Oakleigh Cannons
2005	Green Gully	Heidelberg United	Green Gully	Heidelberg United
2006	South Melbourne	Altona Magic	Oakleigh Cannons	Altona Magic
2007	Preston Lions	Moreland Zebras	Preston Lions	Melbourne Knights
2008	Altona Magic	Melbourne Knights	Green Gully	Melbourne Knights
2009	Altona Magic	Dandenong Thunder	Dandenong Thunder	Altona Magic
2010	Green Gully	Richmond	Richmond	Hume City
2011	Green Gully	Oakleigh Cannons	Green Gully	Oakleigh Cannons
2012	Dandenong Thunder	Oakleigh Cannons	Dandenong Thunder	Oakleigh Cannons
2013	Northcote City	Bentleigh Greens	Northcote City	Melbourne Knights

== Honours table ==
	Champions		Premiers		State League Cup		Dockerty Cup		
Club	Winners	Runners-up	Winners	Runners-up	Winners	Runners-up	Winners	Runners-up	Total
South Melbourne	10	5	2	3	0	2	10	4	36
Green Gully	9	1	4	2	2	2	5	1	26
Brunswick Zebras	8	6	0	0	3	0	6	7	30
Heidelberg United	6	3	3	4	0	1	1	5	23
Footscray Thistle	5	5	1	0	0	0	5	2	18
Prahran City	5	4	0	1	0	0	2	4	16
Altona Magic	5	2	2	4	0	0	0	2	15
Footscray JUST	5	1	0	0	3	1	3	2	15
Hakoah	4	4	0	0	0	1	8	7	24
Moreland City	4	2	1	0	0	0	4	1	12
Preston Lions	4	1	3	0	0	2	2	2	14
Melbourne Knights	3	5	0	3	6	0	9	7	33
Western Eagles	3	4	0	0	1	2	1	4	15
Northumberland & Durham United	3	1	0	2	0	0	3	0	9
Melbourne Thistle	3	0	2	0	0	0	3	1	9
Yarraville	3	0	0	0	0	0	2	1	6
Bentleigh Greens	3	2	1	3	0	0	3	1	13
Oakleigh Cannons	2	5	3	4	0	0	1	2	17
Avondale	2	2	2	0	0	0	1	0	7
Sunshine United	2	2	1	0	0	0	0	0	5
Brunswick Juventus	2	2	0	0	0	0	0	0	4
Morwell Falcons	2	1	0	0	2	2	1	0	8
Croydon City	2	1	0	0	2	0	0	0	5
Carlton United	2	1	0	0	0	0	2	0	5
Caroline Springs George Cross	1	8	0	0	3	3	3	3	21
St Kilda	1	4	1	1	0	0	2	5	14
Brighton	1	3	0	0	0	0	5	3	12
Royal Caledonians	1	3	0	0	0	0	2	2	8
Bulleen Lions	1	2	1	2	0	0	0	0	6
Dandenong Thunder	1	1	2	0	0	0	1	1	6
Naval Depot	1	1	1	0	0	0	3	1	7
Ringwood City	1	1	0	0	1	2	1	2	8
Box Hill United	1	1	0	0	1	0	0	3	6
Nobels	1	1	0	0	0	0	3	0	5
Melbourne Hungaria	1	1	0	0	0	1	0	0	3
Northcote City	1	0	1	0	0	0	1	0	3
North Geelong Warriors	1	0	1	0	0	1	0	0	3
Windsor	1	0	0	0	0	0	0	2	3
Yallourn	1	0	0	0	0	0	0	0	1
Port Melbourne Sharks	0	3	2	1	0	0	0	1	7
Manningham United	0	2	1	1	0	0	1	1	6
Prahran Slavia	0	2	0	0	0	1	3	1	7
St Albans Saints	0	1	1	0	0	1	0	0	3
Albert Park	0	1	1	0	0	0	2	1	5
Park Rangers	0	1	0	1	0	0	2	1	5
South Yarra	0	1	0	0	0	0	1	3	5
Richmond	0	1	1	0	0	0	0	0	2
Frankston Pines	0	1	0	0	1	0	0	0	2
Hume City	0	0	0	2	0	0	1	1	4
Dandenong City	0	1	0	0	0	0	0	0	1

== Former clubs (1963 onwards) ==
- Albion Leyland / Albion Rovers / Albion Turk Gucu / Melton Reds (1978–79, 1982–1985, 1990–1997)
- Altona City (1977–1981)
- Altona East Phoenix (1999–2003)
- Australian Institute of Sport (2007–2008)
- Box Hill / Box Hill Inter (1969–1973, 1983–1990, 1995–1996)
- Broadmeadows (1984)
- Broadmeadows City (1987)
- Caulfield City (1986–1990, 1993)
- Croydon City (1979–84)
- Doncaster Rovers (1995)
- Doveton (1981–1984, 1991)
- Eastern Lions (2020–2022)
- Essendon Lions / Lions (1962–1971)
- Essendon Royals / Triestina (1964–1965, 2001, 2003–2007)
- Fawkner Blues / Manningham United Blues (1983–2004, 2007–2008, 2024)
- Fawkner-Whittlesea Blues (2005–2006)
- FC Melbourne Srbija / Fitzroy City (2002)
- Footscray JUST / Melbourne City JUST (1963–1976, 1990)
- Frankston City (1977–1982)
- Frankston Pines (1984–1987, 1989–1990, 2003–2006, 2008)
- Goulburn Valley Suns (2014)
- Hakoah. St Kilda / St. Kilda Hellas-Hakoah (1963–1982)
- Juventus / Brunswick Zebras / Thomastown Zebras / Bulleen Inter Kings / Bulleen Zebras / Whittlesea Zebras / Brunswick Juventus (1963–1983, 1989–93, 1996–2009, 2012)
- Keilor Austria / Austria (1972–1974)
- Kingston City (2006–2007, 2017–2019)
- Knox City (1984–1985, 1992–1993, 2004)
- Maribyrnong Polonia / Polonia (1963–77, 1982–1989)
- Melbourne Croatia / Melbourne Knights (1963–1972, 1975–1983, 2005–2025)
- Melbourne / Melbourne Hungaria (1963–1975, 1986)
- Melbourne Victory (2016, 2025)
- Moorabbin City (1998)
- Mooroolbark / Mooroolbark United (1974–1976, 1990–1991)
- Moreland City (2023–2024)
- Morwell Falcons (1982–1991)
- North Geelong Croatia / North Geelong Warriors (1992–1997, 2015, 2017, 2023)
- Port Melbourne Slavia / Prahran Slavia (1963–1970, 1973–80)
- Pascoe Vale (2012–2019)
- Port Melbourne SC (1994–2003, 2013–2025)
- Richmond SC / Alemannia Richmond (1963, 2006–2013, 2016)
- Ringwood City Wilhelmina / Ringwood City (1963–1966, 1968–1986, 1988–1990)
- Springvale City (1985–1989, 1993–1996)
- Springvale White Eagles (1997–1999, 2007, 2011)
- Sunshine City (1975–1982)
- Thomastown Devils / Thomastown Zebras / Melbourne Raiders / Whittlesea Ranges (1985–1994, 1997–2000, 2002–2004)
- Werribee City (1994–1995, 2014–2015)
- Western Suburbs (1980, 1984–1988, 2007–2008)
- Westvale Olympic (1999)

== See also ==
- National Premier Leagues Victoria Women
- Victorian Premier League
- Victorian Premier League (1991–2013)
