= Victoria men's soccer team =

Men's association football team representing Victoria, Australia

Victoria
- Association: Football Victoria

First international
- (Victoria (state)) Victoria 2–2 New South Wales (Melbourne, Australia; 16 August 1883)

Biggest win
- (Victoria (state)) Victoria 8–1 Tasmania (Melbourne, Australia; 17 July 1912) (Victoria (state)) Victoria 8–1 Western Australia (Melbourne, Australia; 8 June 1963)

Biggest defeat
- (Victoria (state)) Victoria 0–11 Rapid Vienna (Austria) (Melbourne, Australia; July 1955)

The Victoria men's soccer team is a representative side of Australian state Victoria. Since 1883, alongside New South Wales; Victoria has mainly participated in inter-state matches alongside other representative team matches and occasionally versed overseas club teams in a 126-year period. The team has been inactive since 2009.

== History ==
Victoria played their first matches in 1883 in two test matches against New South Wales; the first resulting on 16 August 1883 in a 2–2 draw at the East Melbourne Cricket Ground in front of 2,000 spectators. Two days later, they played their second match which resulted in a 0–0 draw. Victoria won their first match (4–0 against New South Wales) on 16 July 1885. Victoria continued to play against New South Wales and a collective of district teams until the end of the century. Throughout the early 1900s, Victoria debuted opposition state teams of Western Australia in 1909, Tasmania in 1912, South Australia in 1924, and Queensland in 1932. In June 1923, Australia international George Raitt captained Victoria. In October 1923, Victoria played their first overseas opposition the Chinese Universities in two matches; losing both. The following year in 1924 saw Victoria's debut against national teams; starting with Canada in two matches; winning one and drawing the other. Victoria played their first overseas club in 1927, hosting Czechoslovak side Bohemians AFK Vršovice (now Bohemians 1905) resulting in a 1–0 loss.

In June 1951, two matches against an England XI team saw record attendances for Victoria at the Melbourne Cricket Ground; 12,437 spectators on 6 June, and broken again three days later with 29,652 spectators on 9 June. An inter-state match in January 1962 against New South Wales had 15,000 spectators; record attendance for Victoria against state opposition. On 29 May 1966, the attendance record was re-broken with 35,860 spectators at Olympic Park attending a match against Italian club AS Roma in a 4–2 loss; the highest ever attendance for Victoria. In July 1975, Victoria played overseas matches for the first time; travelling to Nouméa, New Caledonia for two matches against New Caledonia. On 19 September 2009, Victoria played against the Northern New South Wales away in a 3–2 win; as part of 125th year anniversaries for both respective federations and is currently the last match played by Victoria.

== All-time record ==
Key
Positive balance (more Wins)
Neutral balance (Wins = Losses)
Negative balance (more Losses)

Opponent	P	W	D	L	GF	GA	Win %
New South Wales	38	15	8	15	64	79	39.5
Northern New South Wales	3	3	0	0	11	3	100
Queensland	17	11	1	5	51	38	64.7
South Australia	38	18	7	13	72	65	47.4
Tasmania	10	8	2	0	42	10	80
Western Australia	5	3	1	1	17	7	60
Total	111	58	19	34	257	202	52.3
Other representative teams	58	20	6	32	106	179	34.5
Club teams	84 (Note: Victoria v Guangzhou Apollo, 5 October 2002; unknown result.)	12	19	52	101	249	14.3
Total	253	90	44	118	464	630	35.6
