= Melbourne Thistle FC =

Melbourne Thistle
- Full name: Melbourne Thistle Football Club
- Founded: 1912; 114 years ago
- Dissolved: 1935; 91 years ago
- Ground: Middle Park (presumed)

The Melbourne Thistle Football Club was an Australian Anglo-Celtic backed association football (soccer) club based in Melbourne, presumably in the suburb of Albert Park. The club was founded in 1912 and spent most of its existence in the first division league of the Victorian soccer system. The club won seven titles within the state's tier one and tier two leagues, including the Dockerty Cup three times.

The league was in recess from 1916-1918 due to World War 1. Of the 34 Thistle players that enlisted in the Australian Imperial Force, nine members did not survive the war.

Off the field, little is known about the club itself other than a handful of recorded home games were played at the former Middle Park ground in the neighboring suburb of Albert Park. The club was dissolved after resigning from the Victorian First Division mid-season in July 1935.

== Honours ==
=== League ===
- First Division
  - Premiers (4): 1914, 1915, 1920 (Section B), 1925

=== Cup ===
- Dockerty Cup
  - Winners (3): 1914, 1915, 1925
  - Runners-up (1): 1932

=== Doubles ===
- First Division and Dockerty Cup: 3
  - 1914, 1915, 1925
