= Carlton United FC =

Australian association football club

Carlton United
- Full name: Carlton United Football Club
- Founded: 1908; 118 years ago
- Dissolved: 1912; 114 years ago
- League: Victorian First Tier
Home colours

Carlton United Football Club was an Australian association football (soccer) club based in Melbourne, founded in 1908 that presumably dissolved in late 1912. The short lived club is known for its immediate success in being the first tier one state champions of Victoria, and winning the first Dockerty Cup, both in 1909. The club would also be the first in history to go back-to-back in repeating the same feat in 1910 for both the league and the cup. The club would finish second in 1911 and third in 1912 and presumably folded prior to the 1913 season. A photograph from 1909 shows the team wearing a white shirt with a blue pocket, and blue shorts & socks.

== Season by season history ==
The following list is the season-by-season history of the club.

Season	League	Tier	Position	Dockerty Cup
1909	Amateur League	1	1	1
1910	Amateur League	1	1	1
1911	Amateur League	1	2	NA
1912	Division One	1	3	NA

== Honours ==
- Victorian First Tier

Champions (2): 1909, 1910
Runners-up (1): 1911

- Dockerty Cup

Winners (2): 1909, 1910
