= St Kilda SC (1908–1934) =

St Kilda
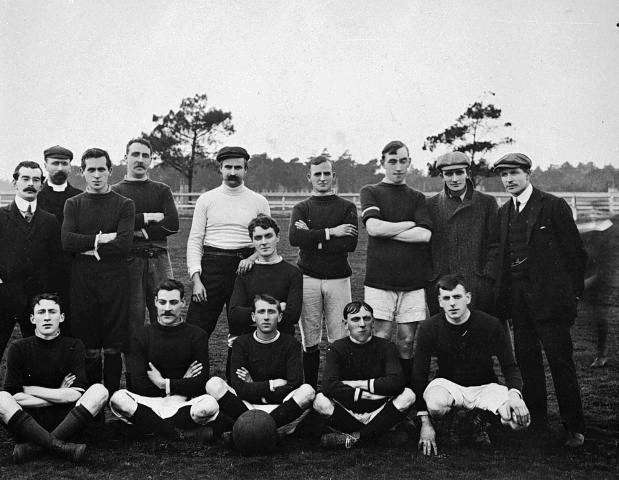
- Full name: St Kilda Soccer Club
- Founded: 1908; 118 years ago
- Dissolved: 1934; 92 years ago
- Ground: Middle Park (presumed)
Home colours

The first known St Kilda Soccer Club was an association football (soccer) club based in the Melbourne suburb of St Kilda. The club was founded in late 1908 and competed in the inaugural first tier league season of the Victorian soccer system in 1909, finishing second. In its existence, the club accumulated fifteen achievements within the state's tier one and tier two leagues, and the Dockerty Cup. The year of 1923 would see the club at its peak in finishing first on the ladder of the tier one league, then known as 'Metropolitan League Division One', winning the finals series grand final against league runners-up Footscray Thistle, and winning the Dockerty Cup twice.

Off the field, little is known about the club itself other than a handful of recorded home games were played at the former Middle Park ground in the neighboring suburb of Albert Park. A photograph from 1909 shows the team wearing a dark blue shirt, white shorts and dark blue socks. The club folded prior to the commencement of the 1935 season alongside fellow tier one winner Windsor and several other clubs. This club also has no connection to either of the two clubs of the same name that followed in 1984–1991 and the present club founded in 2011, currently competing in the Victorian State League Division 1 (tier four).

== Season by season history ==
The following list is the season-by-season history of the club.

Season	League	Tier	Position	Final Series	Dockerty Cup
1909	Amateur League	1	2	NC	2
1910	Amateur League	1	2	NC	NA
1911	Amateur League	1	4	NC	1
1912	Division One	1	4	NC	NA
1913	Division One	1	4	NC	2
1914	Division One	1	3	NC	NA
1915	Division One (Conference B)	1	2	NC	NA
1916–1918	League in recess due to World War I				
1919	Did not compete				
1920	Metropolitan League (Conference A)	1	1	1	NA
1921	Metropolitan League Division One	1	5	NC	NA
1922	Metropolitan League Division One	1	8	NC	NA
1923	Metropolitan League Division One	1	1	1	1
1924	Metropolitan League (Conference A)	1	2	NC	NA
1925	Metropolitan League Division One	1	5	NC	NA
1926	Metropolitan League Division One	1	3	NC	2
1927	Metropolitan District League	1	5	NC	NA
1928	Metropolitan District Championship (Southern Conference)	1	8	NA	NA
1929	Metropolitan League Division One	1	9	NC	2
1930	Metropolitan League Division One	1	6	NC	NA
1931	Metropolitan League Division One	1	7	NC	NA
1932	Metropolitan League Division Two	2	4	NC	2
1933	Metropolitan League Division Two	2	1	NC	NA
1934	Metropolitan League Division One	1	10	NC	NA

== Honours ==
- Victorian First Tier Finals

Champions (2): 1920 (Conference A), 1923
Runners-up (1): 1915 (Conference B)

- Victorian First Tier

Premiers (2): 1920, 1923
Runners-up (3): 1909, 1910, 1924

- Victorian Second Tier

Premiers (1): 1933

- Dockerty Cup

Winners (2): 1911, 1923
Runners-up (5): 1909, 1913, 1926, 1929, 1932
