= Yarraville FC =

Yarraville
- Full name: Yarraville Football Club
- Founded: 5 March 1909; 117 years ago as Williamstown FC
- Dissolved: 1915; 111 years ago presumed
- League: Victorian First Tier
Home colours

Yarraville Football Club was an Australian association football (soocer) club based in the Melbourne suburb of Williamstown. Founded on 5 March 1909 as Williamstown FC before changing its name to Yarraville FC in 1913, the short lived club flourished in what was then the newly established first tier state league of Victoria. Finishing mid table in 1909 and 1910, the club would be the first in the league's history to be champions three consecutive seasons (1911–1913). The club would also win the Dockerty Cup in 1912 and 1913. Due to World War I, the 1916–1918 seasons were cancelled, being possible that the club folded within the three years no competition, not necessarily in 1915, and didn't re-establish in 1919. This club has no connection to any of the Williamstown and Yarraville soccer clubs that followed.

== Honours ==
- Victorian First Tier

Premiers (3): 1911, 1912, 1913

- Dockerty Cup

Winners (2): 1912, 1913
Runners-up (1): 1911
