= Brighton SC =

Brighton
- Full name: Brighton Soccer Club
- Founded: 1908; 118 years ago in earliest form 1987; 39 years ago as present entity
- Ground: Dendy Park
- Chairman: Elliot Epstein
- Head Coach: Tass Dimitroulis
- League: VSL 5 South (Men); VWSL 4 South-East
- 2024: 11th- relegated (Men); 10th (Women)
Home colours	Away colours

The Brighton Soccer Club is an Australian community-run soccer club based in the Melbourne suburb of Brighton. The club was founded in late 1987 by the merger of the original Brighton and Prahran City soccer clubs founded in 1924 and 1908 respectively. The club fields both senior and reserve teams for men & women, . This club has no connection to the defunct 'Prahran City Football Club' that competed in 2012–2015.

== Honours ==
=== Historical (1909–1987) ===
==== Brighton (1925–1987) ====
- Dockerty Cup

Winners (5): 1933, 1937, 1943, 1944, 1952
Runner's up (3): 1951, 1953, 1956

- Victorian First Tier

Premiers (1): 1949
Runner's up (3): 1944, 1945, 1952

- Victorian Second Tier

Premiers (1): 1927
Runner's up (2): 1930, 1961

- Victorian Fourth Tier

Premiers (1): 1974
Runner's up (1): 1925, 1969

==== Prahran/Prahran City (1909–1987) ====
- Dockerty Cup

Winners (2): 1942, 1946
Runners-up (4): 1910, 1937, 1939, 1941

- Victorian First Tier

Premiers (4): 1927, 1939, 1944, 1945
Runner's up (5): 1937, 1941, 1943, 1946, 1947

- Victorian Second Tier

Runner's up (3): 1926, 1936, 1955

- Victorian Third Tier

Premiers (1): 1969

- Victorian Fourth Tier

Premiers (1): 1985
Runner's up (1): 1968

==== Recent (1988–present) ====
- Victorian Third Tier

Runner's up (1): 1990

- Victorian Sixth Tier

Premiers (1): 2015 (South)
