= Dockerty Cup =

Association football sup competition established in 1909 in Victoria, Australia

- Organiser(s): Football Victoria
- Founded: 1909; 117 years ago
- Region: Victoria
- Teams: 220 (in 2026)
- Qualifier for: Australia Cup; FV Community Shield
- Current champions: Preston Lions (2026)
- Most championships: South Melbourne (10 titles)
- Website: Football Victoria
- 2026 Dockerty Cup

The Dockerty Cup is a men's annual soccer knock-out competition open to all Victorian clubs across the state's football league system. The tournament is named after Harry Dockerty, an early pioneer of soccer in Victoria.

Since 2014, the Dockerty Cup has also been a qualifying competition for the Australia Cup (formerly known as the FFA Cup), in which the four finalists enter the competition proper at the round of 32. The Dockerty Cup winner also qualifies for the following season's FV Community Shield in a one-off match against the reigning NPL Victoria champion.

== History ==
Dockerty Cup winners: Northumberland & Durham United. 1914

The Dockerty Challenge Cup competition was established in 1909 by Harry Dockerty. It coincided with re-establishment of the Victoria's 'British Association' league in 1909 after the economic depression of the 1890s.

In 1909, the first Cup competition involved six teams (St Kilda SC, Prahran, Carlton United, Fitzroy District FC, Melbourne United and Williamstown). The first match took place at the Gardens Reserve in Williamstown on 24 July 1909.

In the final played on the East Melbourne Cricket Ground, league premiers Carlton United defeated St Kilda SC 2–1.

In 1914, Melbourne Thistle and Northumberland & Durham compete in two finals both ending in scoreless draws and the teams share the Cup.

The cup was not played in 1916–18 due to World War I but was played consecutively for the next 77 years from 1919 to 1996.

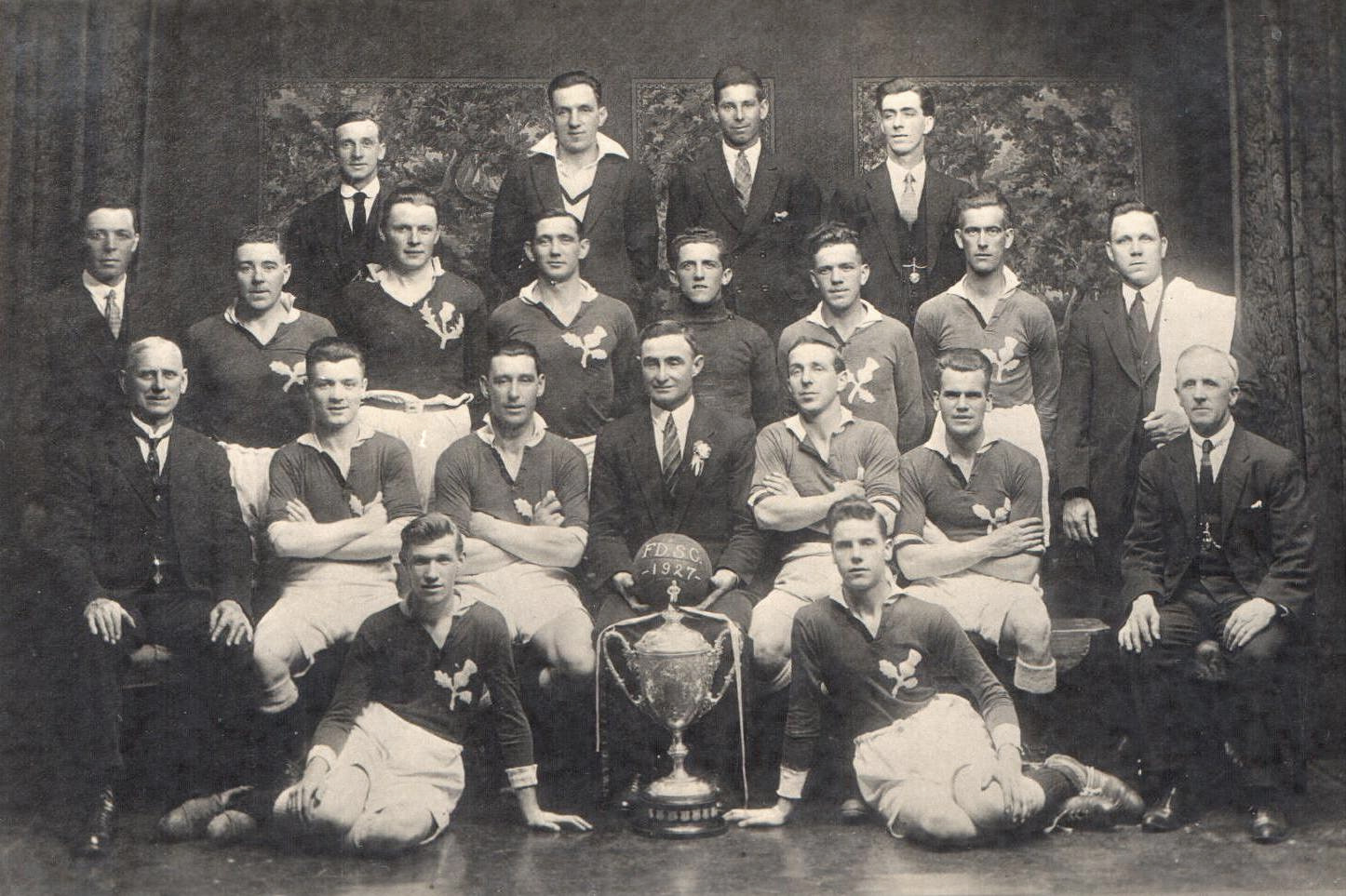
Footscray Thistle with the 1927 Dockerty Cup.

In 1931, Wonthaggi Magpies became the first club from regional Victoria to win the Dockerty Cup - defeating Brunswick 1-0 in a third final replay at Wonthaggi Oval after two scoreless draws.

In 1953, the fixture changes from a post season competition to be played during the league season.

Following the 1996 season, the Dockerty Cup was in recess before returning in 2004 as the "Crazy John's Cup", although this only lasted for one season and the competition went back into recess for six years.

A Victorian cup competition was reintroduced in 2011 as the "Mirabella Cup" due to naming rights sponsorship. That arrangement lasted only one season, with the competition being named the "FFV State Knockout Cup" in 2012 and 2013. However, in both years, the winner was awarded with the Dockerty Cup trophy.

From the 2014 season onwards, it is once again known as the Dockerty Cup.

== Format ==
=== Eligibility ===
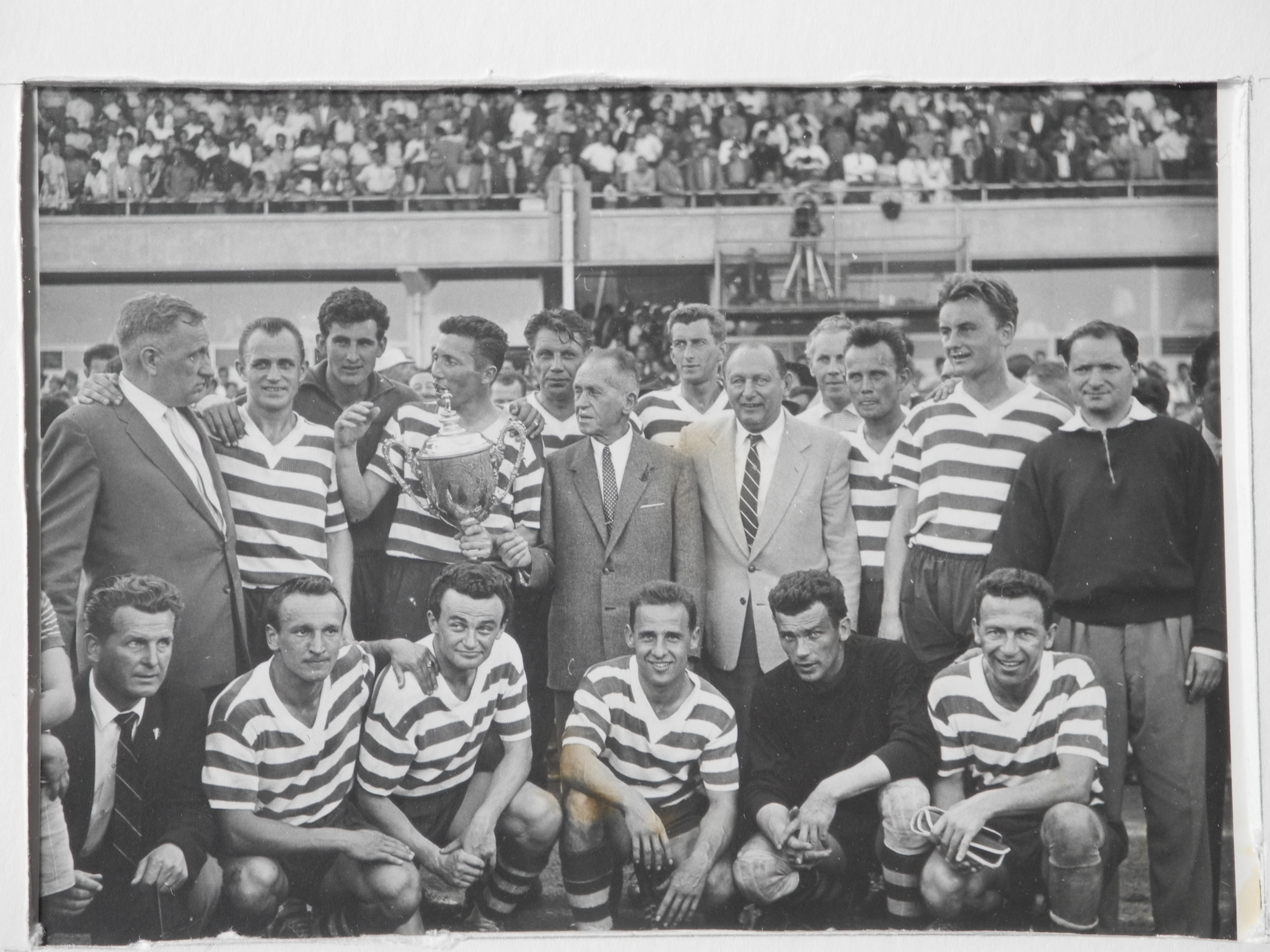
Melbourne Polonia win the Dockerty Cup final at Olimpic Park, Melbourne, 7 October 1961

Participation in the Dockerty Cup is mandatory for the senior men's team from every Victorian club within the National Premier Leagues and the State Leagues, and optional for teams from the Victorian regional leagues. Because the competition serves as the preliminary rounds for the Australia Cup competition, only one team per Club is eligible. This means that the youth sides of Melbourne Victory Youth and Melbourne City Youth and Western United FC Youth are excluded from the competition, as their parent A-League sides separately participate in the competition.

Additionally if a Victorian club wins the NPL Championship – as occurred with Heidelberg United in the 2018 Dockerty Cup – they are excluded from the preliminary rounds as they have also qualified for the FFA Cup at the round of 32. Instead they join the Dockerty Cup competition in a special playoff round match held the week prior to the semi-finals.

=== Competition format ===
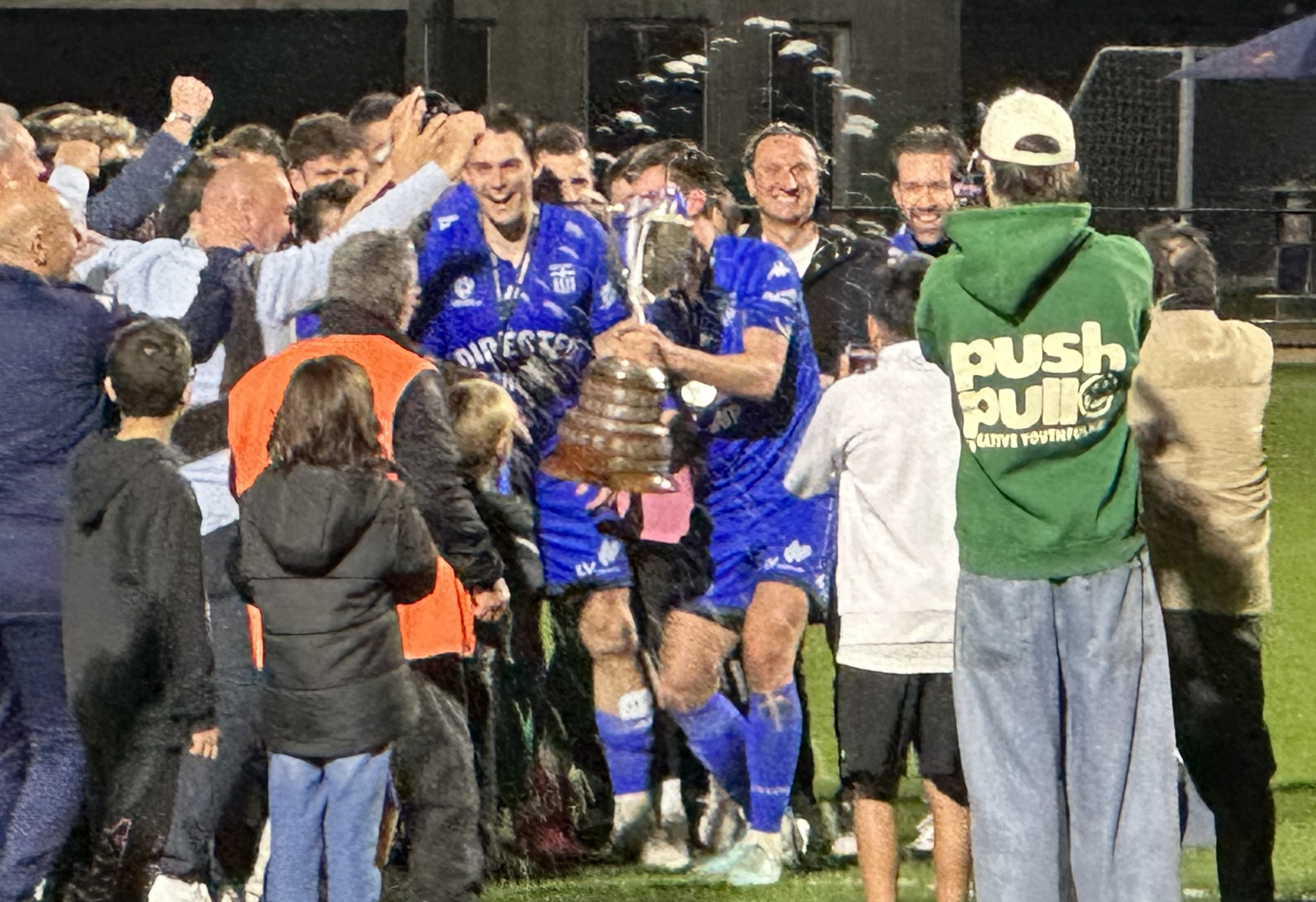
South Melbourne players celebrate following their win over Heidelberg United in the 2025 Dockerty Cup Final

The competition acts a classic single-elimination knock-out tournament, with one team progressing from each tie to the next round. Fixtures for each round are determined by a random draw, with teams entering the tournament on a staggered basis, depending on their respective positions in the league hierarchy. The team drawn first hosts the match, with the final being held at a neutral venue. No replays are currently utilised in the Dockerty Cup, with a drawn match going to 30 minutes of extra time and eventually a penalty shoot-out if necessary.

=== Qualification for subsequent competitions ===
==== Australia Cup ====
Since 2014, the Dockerty Cup has also served as preliminary competition for the FFA Cup, now known as the Australia Cup, from the first qualifying round to the Seventh Round. In 2022 five teams qualify as Victoria's representatives, at the round of 32.

In 2020, the FFA Cup competition was cancelled due to the COVID-19 pandemic in Australia.

Federation	Competition	Total Australia Cup Victorian Entrants												
Federation	Competition	2014	2015	2016	2017	2018	2019	2020	2021	2022	2023	2024	2025	2026
National	A-League	2	2	2	2	2	2	–	3	3	2	2	3	2
National	NPL Champions	–	–	–	–	1	–	–	–	–	–	–	–	–
National	Australian Championship	–	–	–	–	–	–	–	–	–	–	–	–	1
Football Victoria	Dockerty Cup	190 → 4	191 → 4	202 → 4	217 → 4	217 → 4	214 → 4	223 → 0	210 → 4	211 → 5	218 → 5	219 → 5	218 → 4	220 → 4
Total Victorian Round of 32 Qualifiers		6	6	6	6	7	6	–	7	8	7	7	7	7

==== FV Community Shield ====
Since 2014 the Dockerty Cup winners also qualify for the following season's single-match FV Community Shield, the season opener played against the current NPL Victoria champions.

=== Prize fund ===
The prize fund for the 2018 Dockerty Cup is detailed below.

Round	No. of Clubs receive fund	Prize fund
Play-off Loser	1	$2,500
Semi-finalists	2	$2,500
Runner-up	1	$5,000
Champion	1	$10,000
Total	5	$22,500

== Media coverage ==
The Dockerty Cup trophy prior to the 2025 final

In 2019 it was announced that Football Victoria had signed a three-year broadcast arrangement with YouTube and Facebook that will see the Dockerty Cup's semi-finals and final broadcast live.

Additionally each draw of the Dockerty Cup round's are broadcast live on Football Victoria YouTube channel, while a number of clubs will provide live score updates during each match either via the clubs official website, Facebook, or X.

== Records and honours ==
=== Dockerty Cup finals (current format since 2014) ===
Year	Winner (Titles)	Score	Runner-up	Total clubs	Australia Cup (FFA Cup) Qualifiers				
2014	Melbourne Knights (9)	1–0 (a.e.t.)	South Springvale	190	Bentleigh Greens	Melbourne Knights	South Springvale	St Albans Saints	
2015	South Melbourne (8)	3–0	Oakleigh Cannons	191	Heidelberg United	Hume City	Oakleigh Cannons	South Melbourne	
2016	Bentleigh Greens (1)	1–0 (a.e.t.)	Green Gully	202	Bentleigh Greens	Green Gully	Hume City	Melbourne Knights	
2017	Heidelberg United (1)	1–1 (a.e.t.); 5–4 (p)	Bentleigh Greens	217	Bentleigh Greens	Heidelberg United (Note: Qualified as the 2017 NPL Champions and entered the Cup via an additional playoff match.)	Hume City	South Melbourne	
2018	Bentleigh Greens (2)	2–0	Heidelberg United	217	Avondale FC	Bentleigh Greens	Northcote City	Port Melbourne	Heidelberg United^{1}
2019	Hume City (1)	1–0	Melbourne Knights	214	Bulleen Lions	Hume City	Melbourne Knights	Moreland Zebras	
2020	Dockerty Cup and 2020 FFA Cup cancelled due to the COVID-19 pandemic in Australia.								
2021	Avondale FC (1)	1–0	Hume City	210	Avondale FC	Hume City	Port Melbourne	South Melbourne	
2022	Bentleigh Greens (3)	2–1	Oakleigh Cannons	211	Avondale FC	Bentleigh Greens	Green Gully	Heidelberg United	Oakleigh Cannons
2023	Oakleigh Cannons (1)	3–0	Heidelberg United	218	Goulburn Valley Suns	Heidelberg United	Melbourne Knights	Northcote City	Oakleigh Cannons
2024	South Melbourne (9)	0–0 (a.e.t.); 5–4 (p)	Oakleigh Cannons	219	Heidelberg United	Hume City	Melbourne Srbija	Oakleigh Cannons	South Melbourne
2025	South Melbourne (10)	2–1	Heidelberg United	218	Avondale FC	Heidelberg United	Nunawading City	South Melbourne	
2026	Preston Lions (2)	3–1	Heidelberg United	220	Brunswick Juventus (Note: This team establish in 1997 as breakaway club based in Fawkner, Victoria and is not associate with Brunswick Zebras formerly Juventus, Brunswick United Juventus.)	Heidelberg United	North Sunshine Eagles	Preston Lions	South Melbourne (Note: Qualified as the Winner of the 2025 Australian Championship)

=== List of Dockerty Cup winners (1909–2013) ===
Competition and Year	Winner
Dockerty Cup 1909	Carlton United
Dockerty Cup 1910	Carlton United
Dockerty Cup 1911	St Kilda
Dockerty Cup 1912	Williamstown
Dockerty Cup 1913	Yarraville (formerly Williamstown)
Dockerty Cup 1914	Melbourne Thistle
Dockerty Cup 1915	Melbourne Thistle
1916 to 1918	No competition due to World War 1
Dockerty Cup 1919	Footscray Thistle
Dockerty Cup 1920	Albert Park / Northumberland and Durham (Note: Finalists : game abandoned)
Dockerty Cup 1921	Northumberland and Durham
Dockerty Cup 1922	Albert Park
Dockerty Cup 1923	St Kilda
Dockerty Cup 1924	Navy
Dockerty Cup 1925	Melbourne Thistle
Dockerty Cup 1926	Navy
Dockerty Cup 1927	Footscray Thistle
Dockerty Cup 1928	Navy
Dockerty Cup 1929	Footscray Thistle
Dockerty Cup 1930	Footscray Thistle
Dockerty Cup 1931	Wonthaggi Magpies
Dockerty Cup 1932	Footscray Thistle
Dockerty Cup 1933	Brighton
Dockerty Cup 1934	Royal Caledonians (Note: won on replay, after original match was drawn.)
Dockerty Cup 1935	Melbourne Hakoah
Dockerty Cup 1936	Royal Caledonians
Dockerty Cup 1937	Brighton
Dockerty Cup 1938	Nobels
Dockerty Cup 1939	Imperial Chemical Industries (formerly Nobels)
Dockerty Cup 1940	Imperial Chemical Industries
Dockerty Cup 1941	Moreland
Dockerty Cup 1942	Prahran City
Dockerty Cup 1943	Brighton
Dockerty Cup 1944	Brighton
Dockerty Cup 1945	Moreland-Hakoah
Dockerty Cup 1946	Prahran City
Dockerty Cup 1947	South Yarra
Dockerty Cup 1948	Park Rangers
Dockerty Cup 1949	Park Rangers
Dockerty Cup 1950	Moreland
Dockerty Cup 1951	J.U.S.T.
Dockerty Cup 1952	Brighton
Dockerty Cup 1953	Melbourne Hakoah
Dockerty Cup 1954	Melbourne Hakoah
Dockerty Cup 1955	Melbourne Hakoah
Dockerty Cup 1956	Melbourne Hakoah
Dockerty Cup 1957	Moreland
Dockerty Cup 1958	Ringwood Wilhelmina

Competition and Year	Winner
Dockerty Cup 1959	George Cross
Dockerty Cup 1960	Juventus
Dockerty Cup 1961	Polonia
Dockerty Cup 1962	George Cross
Dockerty Cup 1963	Footscray JUST
Dockerty Cup 1964	Slavia
Dockerty Cup 1965	Slavia
Dockerty Cup 1966	Melbourne Hakoah
Dockerty Cup 1967	Port Melbourne Slavia
Dockerty Cup 1968	Croatia
Dockerty Cup 1969	Croatia
Dockerty Cup 1970	Juventus
Dockerty Cup 1971	Juventus
Dockerty Cup 1972	Juventus
Dockerty Cup 1973	Hakoah St.Kilda
Dockerty Cup 1974	South Melbourne Hellas
Dockerty Cup 1975	South Melbourne Hellas
Dockerty Cup 1976	Footscray JUST
Dockerty Cup 1977	Juventus
Dockerty Cup 1978	George Cross
Dockerty Cup 1979	Essendon Croatia
Dockerty Cup 1980	Essendon Croatia
Dockerty Cup 1981	Green Gully Ajax
Dockerty Cup 1982	Green Gully
Dockerty Cup 1983	Melbourne Croatia
Dockerty Cup 1984	Fawkner
Dockerty Cup 1985	Melbourne Croatia
Dockerty Cup 1986	Green Gully
Dockerty Cup 1987	Brunswick United Juventus
Dockerty Cup 1988	South Melbourne Hellas (Note: Awarded upon successful protest, after Melbourne Croatia had won the match 4–3, but had fielded an ineligible player.)
Dockerty Cup 1989	South Melbourne Hellas
Dockerty Cup 1990	Melbourne Croatia
Dockerty Cup 1991	South Melbourne Hellas
Dockerty Cup 1992	Preston Makedonia
Dockerty Cup 1993	South Melbourne
Dockerty Cup 1994	Morwell Falcons
Dockerty Cup 1995	South Melbourne
Dockerty Cup 1996	Melbourne Knights
1997 to 2003	not played
Crazy John's Cup 2004	Green Gully
2005 to 2010	not played
Mirabella Cup 2011	Northcote City SC
FFV State Knockout Cup 2012	Dandenong Thunder
FFV State Knockout Cup 2013	Green Gully

=== Overall Honours ===
Club	Winners	Runners-up	Winning years
South Melbourne (Note: formerly South Melbourne Hellas)	10	4	1974, 1975, 1988, 1989, 1991, 1993, 1995, 2015, 2024, 2025
Melbourne Knights (Note: formerly Croatia, Essendon Croatia, Melbourne Croatia)	9	7	1968, 1969, 1979, 1980, 1983, 1985, 1990, 1996, 2014
Melbourne Hakoah (Note: formerly Moreland-Hakoah, Melbourne St. Kilda)	8	7	1935, 1945, 1953, 1954, 1955, 1956, 1966, 1973
Brunswick Zebras Juventus (Note: formerly Juventus, Brunswick United Juventus)	6	7	1960, 1970, 1971, 1972, 1977, 1987
Footscray Thistle	5	2	1919, 1927, 1929, 1930, 1932
Brighton	5	3	1933, 1937, 1943, 1944, 1952
Green Gully Cavaliers (Note: formerly Green Gully Ajax)	5	1	1981, 1982, 1986, 2004, 2013
Bentleigh Greens	3	1	2016, 2018, 2022
Preston Lions (Note: formerly Preston Makedonia)	2	2	1992, 2026
Heidelberg United (Note: formerly Fitzroy United Alexander)	1	5	2017
Oakleigh Cannons	1	3	2023
Hume City (Note: formerly Holland Park Football Club, North Coburg SC, Coburg United)	1	1	2019
