= 2023 Football Victoria season =

Football Victoria
- Season: 2023
- Dates: 20 February - 18 September 2023
- Champions: Avondale FC
- Premiers: Avondale FC
- Dockety Cup Champion: Oakleigh Cannons

The 2023 Football Victoria season was the 112th season of competitive soccer in Victoria.

The premier and champion was Avondale FC. Oakleigh Cannons would beat Heidelberg United 3–0 to win the 2023 Dockerty Cup.

== League Tables ==
=== 2023 National Premier Leagues Victoria ===
National Premier Leagues Victoria
- Season: 2023
- Champions: Avondale FC
- Premiers: Avondale FC
- Relegated: Bentleigh Greens; North Geelong Warriors
- Matches: 182
- Goals: 612 (3.36 per match)
- All statistics correct as of 12 August 2024.

Avondale FC were crowned premiers and champions of the 2023 NPL Victoria.

==== Regular season ====
Pos	Team	Pld	W	D	L	GF	GA	GD	Pts	Qualification or relegation
1	Avondale FC (C)	26	21	4	1	78	23	+55	67	2023 NPL Victoria Finals
2	South Melbourne	26	20	2	4	56	23	+33	62	2023 NPL Victoria Finals
3	Oakleigh Cannons	26	18	4	4	64	25	+39	58	2023 NPL Victoria Finals
4	Melbourne Knights	26	14	5	7	51	35	+16	47	2023 NPL Victoria Finals
5	Port Melbourne	26	13	6	7	53	34	+19	45	2023 NPL Victoria Finals
6	Altona Magic	26	13	2	11	48	53	−5	41	2023 NPL Victoria Finals
7	Green Gully	26	13	1	12	53	40	+13	40	
8	Dandenong Thunder	26	10	3	13	49	48	+1	33	
9	Heidelberg United	26	8	7	11	31	46	−15	31	
10	Hume City	26	7	7	12	37	41	−4	28	
11	St Albans Saints	26	6	4	16	24	53	−29	22	
12	Moreland City	26	4	4	18	26	69	−43	16	
13	Bentleigh Greens (R)	26	4	3	19	24	51	−27	15	Relegation to the 2024 VPL 1
14	North Geelong Warriors (R)	26	4	2	20	18	71	−53	14	Relegation to the 2024 VPL 1

Source: mygameday
Rules for classification: 1) points; 2) goal difference; 3) number of goals scored.
(C) Champions; (R) Relegated

==== Finals Series ====
Avondale FC would beat South Melbourne 4–0 at Olympic Park in Heidelberg West on 10 September 2023.

Elimination finals
4	Melbourne Knights	2
5	Port Melbourne	0
3	Oakleigh Cannons	5
6	Altona Magic	0

Preliminary finals
1	Avondale FC	1
4	Melbourne Knights	0
2	South Melbourne	2
3	Oakleigh Cannons	1

Grand final
1	Avondale FC	4
2	South Melbourne	0

=== 2023 National Premier Leagues Victoria 2 ===
NPL Victoria 2
- Season: 2023
- Champions: Dandenong City
- Promoted: Dandenong City; Manningham United Blues
- Relegated: Brunswick Juventus; Pascoe Vale
- Matches: 182
- Goals: 601 (3.3 per match)
- Top goalscorer: Luke Jonathan Lofts
- Biggest home win: Western United Youth 5–0 Werribee City (24 June 2023)
- Biggest away win: Kingston City 0–5 Manningham United Blues (11 August 2023)
- Highest scoring: Melbourne City Youth 6–3 Eastern Lions (5 March 2023)

Dandenong City Was crowned NPL Victoria 2 Champion and gained promotion alongside Manningham United Blues. Brunswick Juventus and Pascoe Vale were relegated to VPL 2.

Pos	Team	Pld	W	D	L	GF	GA	GD	Pts	Promotion, qualification or relegation
1	Dandenong City (C, P)	26	15	4	7	45	30	+15	49	Promotion to the NPL Victoria
2	Manningham United Blues (P)	26	12	8	6	57	44	+13	44	Promotion to the NPL Victoria
3	Western United Youth	26	13	4	9	44	30	+14	43	
4	Kingston City	26	12	5	9	47	43	+4	41	
5	Eastern Lions	26	12	3	11	37	40	−3	39	
6	Northcote City	26	11	4	11	42	40	+2	37	
7	Bulleen Lions	26	11	3	12	49	40	+9	36	
8	Preston Lions	26	9	9	8	37	36	+1	36	
9	Melbourne City Youth	26	11	3	12	54	56	−2	36	
10	Langwarrin SC	26	11	3	12	50	56	−6	36	
11	Werribee City	26	8	7	11	39	45	−6	31	
12	Brunswick City	26	9	4	13	35	44	−9	31	
13	Brunswick Juventus (R)	26	8	5	13	30	39	−9	29	Relegation to VPL 2
14	Pascoe Vale (R)	26	8	2	16	35	58	−23	26	Relegation to VPL 2

Rules for classification: 1) Points; 2) Goal difference; 3) Goals scored
(C) Champions; (P) Promoted; (R) Relegated

=== 2023 National Premier Leagues Victoria 3 ===
NPL Victoria 3
- Season: 2023
- Dates: 18 March – 19 August 2023
- Champions: Caroline Springs George Cross
- Promoted: Caroline Springs George Cross; Melbourne Victory Youth
- Relegated: Geelong SC; Ballarat City
- Matches: 132
- Goals: 466 (3.53 per match)
- Top goalscorer: Joshua Whiteley (16); Redouane Sarakh; Russell Currie
- All statistics correct as of 10 August 2024.

Caroline Springs George Cross Was crowned NPL Victoria 3 Champion and gained promotion alongside Melbourne Victory Youth. Geelong SC and Ballarat City were relegated to the Victorian State League 1.

Pos	Team	Pld	W	D	L	GF	GA	GD	Pts	Promotion, qualification or relegation
1	Caroline Springs George Cross (C, P)	22	17	1	4	50	23	+27	52	Promotion to the VPL 1
2	Melbourne Victory Youth (P)	22	13	3	6	47	22	+25	42	Promotion to the VPL 1
3	North Sunshine Eagles	22	12	2	8	55	41	+14	38	
4	Goulburn Valley Suns	22	11	5	6	41	35	+6	38	
5	Nunawading City	22	11	2	9	46	39	+7	35	
6	Boroondara-Carey Eagles	22	11	2	9	43	41	+2	35	
7	Doveton SC	22	8	3	11	27	42	−15	27	
8	Box Hill United	22	7	4	11	34	44	−10	25	
9	Beaumaris SC	22	7	3	12	32	39	−7	24	
10	Essendon Royals	22	6	5	11	29	36	−7	23	
11	Geelong SC (R)	22	5	6	11	27	40	−13	21	Relegation to Victorian State League Division 1
12	Ballarat City (R)	22	5	2	15	35	64	−29	17	Relegation to Victorian State League Division 1

Rules for classification: 1) Points; 2) Goal difference; 3) Goals scored
(C) Champions; (P) Promoted; (R) Relegated

== State Leagues ==
The 2023 Victorian state leagues were made up of 14 leagues taking up 5 levels of the Australian football league system. It covers tier 5 to tier 9 Australian football league system. The 2 premiers of the Victorian State League 1 are promoted to VPL 2

Competition	Premiers	Champions	Score	Runner up	ref
State League 1	North-West: Altona City South-East: Melbourne Srbija	Altona City	3-2 (a.e.t.)	Melbourne Srbija	
State League 2	North-West: FC Clifton Hill South-East: Mazenod FC	Mazenod FC	6-0	FC Clifton Hill	
State League 3	North-West: Uni Hill Eagles South-East: Chisholm United	Chisholm United	1-0	Uni Hill Eagles	
State League 4	North: Bundoora United West: Laverton FC South: White Star Dandenong East: St Kilda SC	St Kilda SC	3-2	Bundoora United	
State League 5	North: Yarra Jets West: Balmoral FC South: Hampton Park United East: Knox United	Balmoral FC	4-1	Hampton Park United	

== Women's Football ==
=== 2023 National Premier Leagues Victoria Women ===
National Premier Leagues Victoria Women
- Season: 2023
- Dates: 17 March 2023 – 10 September 2023
- Champions: South Melbourne
- Premiers: Bulleen Lions
- Matches: 110
- Goals: 414 (3.76 per match)
- Top goalscorer: Kurea Okino (31 goals)
- Biggest home win: Boroondara-Carey Eagles 7–0; Box Hill United (17 June 2023)
- Biggest away win: Heidelberg United 0–6; Calder United (16 July 2023)
- Longest losing run: 7 matches Southern United
- All statistics correct as of 12 August 2024.

Bulleen Lions Would be crowned NPL Victoria Women's Premier's and South Melbourne also were crowned NPL Victoria Women's Champions.

==== Regular season ====
Pos	Team	Pld	W	D	L	GF	GA	GD	Pts	Qualification or relegation
1	Bulleen Lions	20	11	7	2	36	19	+17	40	Qualification for finals series
2	Boroondara-Carey Eagles	20	12	2	6	61	42	+19	38	Qualification for finals series
3	South Melbourne	20	10	6	4	40	25	+15	36	Qualification for finals series
4	Calder United	20	10	5	5	47	28	+19	35	Qualification for finals series
5	Alamein	20	8	7	5	44	39	+5	31	
6	Preston Lions FC	20	8	5	7	32	32	0	29	
7	Box Hill United	20	9	2	9	38	40	−2	29	
8	Bayside United	20	7	2	11	33	40	−7	23	
9	Heidelberg United	20	6	5	9	34	44	−10	23	
10	FV Emerging	20	4	5	11	33	49	−16	17	Relegation to VPL Women's
11	Southern United	20	0	4	16	16	56	−40	4	Relegation to VPL Women's

Updated to match(es) played on 18 August 2023. Source: NPL VIC Women
Rules for classification: 1) Points; 2) Goal difference; 3) Goals scored

==== Finals Series ====
South Melbourne would beat Bulleen Lions 4–2 in the NPL Victoria Women's Grand Final.

Semifinals
2 September - David Barro Stadium
1	Bulleen Lions (a.e.t.)	2
4	Calder United	1
2 September - David Barro Stadium
2	Boroondara-Carey Eagles	1
3	South Melbourne	2

Final
9 September - Home of the Matildas
1	Bulleen Lions	2
3	South Melbourne	4

== Cup Competitions ==
=== Dockerty Cup ===
Oakleigh Cannons won its first Dockerty Cup, defeating Heidelberg United in the final on 4 August 2023.

4 August 2023
19:30 AEST

Oakleigh Cannons	3–0	Heidelberg United
Guest 28' (pen.), 59' (pen.); Salmon 84'		Fetahagić (red card)

Kingston Heath Soccer Complex
