= 2025 Football Victoria season =

Football Victoria
- Season: 2025
- Dates: 6 February – 14 September 2025
- Champions: Avondale FC
- Premiers: Heidelberg United
- Dockety Cup Champion: South Melbourne
- FV Community Shield champion: South Melbourne

The 2025 Football Victoria season was the 114th season of competitive soccer in Victoria.

The premier of the top tier of Victorian football was Avondale FC and Heidelberg United would win the NPL Victoria Grand Final, making Heidelberg the 2025 NPL Victoria champions. South Melbourne also beat Heidelberg United to win the 2025 Dockerty Cup.

== League competitions ==
League	Promoted to league	Relegated from league
NPL	Preston Lions Melbourne Victory Youth	Manningham United Blues Moreland City
VPL 1	Melbourne Srbija North Sunshine Eagles	Werribee City North Geelong Warriors
VPL 2	Eltham Redbacks Altona City Geelong SC	Doveton SC Beaumaris SC

=== 2025 National Premier Leagues Victoria ===
National Premier Leagues Victoria
- Season: 2025
- Dates: 6 February – 14 September 2025
- Champions: Heidelberg United
- Premiers: Avondale FC
- Relegated: Melbourne Victory Youth; Port Melbourne; Melbourne Knights
- Matches: 182
- Goals: 601 (3.3 per match)
- Biggest home win: Dandenong City 7–1 Melbourne Knights (16 Aug 2025); Dandenong Thunder 6–0 Altona Magic (7 Jun 2025)
- Biggest away win: Green Gully 0–5 Dandenong City (7 Mar 2025)
- Longest winning run: 6 – Avondale (7 Feb – 22 Mar)
- All statistics correct as of 2025-08-24.

South Melbourne were crowned premiers of NPL Victoria. Heidelberg United also beat Dandenong City 2-1 in the NPL Victoria Grand Final.

==== Regular season ====
Pos	Team	Pld	W	D	L	GF	GA	GD	Pts	Promotion, qualification or relegation
1	Avondale FC (Note: Team pre-qualified to the Australian Championship as a Foundation club.)	26	19	4	3	66	27	+39	61	Qualification to Finals series
2	Heidelberg United (C, Q)	26	17	6	3	55	25	+30	57	Qualification to Australian Championship and Finals series (Note: The second-placed team qualified to the Australian Championship since the Premier is one of the three NPL Victoria teams that have already qualified as "Foundation Clubs".)
3	Dandenong Thunder	26	16	5	5	60	32	+28	53	Qualification to Finals series
4	Oakleigh Cannons	26	15	4	7	58	33	+25	49	Qualification to Finals series
5	Preston Lions	26	14	5	7	40	28	+12	47	Qualification to Finals series
6	Dandenong City	26	10	10	6	51	38	+13	40	Qualification to Finals series
7	Hume City	26	11	5	10	42	40	+2	38	
8	Green Gully	26	8	7	11	39	42	−3	31	
9	South Melbourne	26	7	7	12	29	46	−17	28	
10	Altona Magic	26	7	6	13	28	38	−10	27	
11	St Albans Saints	26	7	6	13	45	56	−11	27	
12	Melbourne Victory Youth (R)	26	5	3	18	36	60	−24	18	Relegation to Victorian Premier League 1
13	Port Melbourne (R)	26	4	5	17	24	64	−40	17	Relegation to Victorian Premier League 1
14	Melbourne Knights (R)	26	4	3	19	28	72	−44	15	Relegation to Victorian Premier League 1

Source: MyGameday
Rules for classification: 1) points; 2) goal difference; 3) number of goals scored; 4) aggregate head-to-head results; 5) away goals; 6) alphabetical order/coin toss at the end of the season.
(C) Champions; (Q) Qualified for the phase indicated; (R) Relegated

==== Finals series ====
Elimination finals
3	Dandenong Thunder	0
6	Dandenong City	1
4	Oakleigh Cannons	1
5	Preston Lions	2

Preliminary finals
1	Avondale FC	0
6	Dandenong City	1
2	Heidelberg United	2
5	Preston Lions	1

Grand final
6	Dandenong City	1
2	Heidelberg United	2

=== 2025 Victoria Premier League 1 ===
Victoria Premier League 1
- Season: 2025
- Dates: 7 February – 14 September 2025
- Champions: Bentleigh Greens
- Promoted: Bentleigh Greens; Caroline Springs George Cross; Melbourne City Youth
- Relegated: Eastern Lions; Kingston City; Moreland City
- Matches: 182
- Goals: 656 (3.6 per match)
- Top goalscorer: Luke Jonathan Lofts (16)
- Biggest home win: Melbourne City Youth 8–1 Moreland City (2 March 2025)
- Biggest away win: Western United Youth 0–4 Melbourne City Youth (30 March 2025)
- Highest scoring: Melbourne City Youth 8–1 Moreland City (2 March 2025)
- All statistics correct as of 27 August 2025.

Bentleigh Greens was crowned VPL 1 Champion, gained promotion alongside Caroline Springs George Cross and promotion play-off winner Melbourne City Youth. Eastern Lions, Kingston City and Moreland City were relegated to VPL 2.

==== Regular season ====
Pos	Team	Pld	W	D	L	GF	GA	GD	Pts	Promotion, qualification or relegation
1	Bentleigh Greens (C, P)	26	18	4	4	45	20	+25	58	Promotion to NPL Victoria
2	Caroline Springs George Cross (P)	26	19	0	7	77	35	+42	57	Promotion to NPL Victoria
3	Melbourne City Youth (P)	26	16	6	4	66	28	+38	54	Advance to promotional play-offs
4	Western United Youth	26	13	7	6	61	50	+11	46	Withdrawn from promotional play-offs (Note: Western United's overall licence was revoked. The academy team will still participate in the 2026 season.)
5	Brunswick City	26	12	6	8	43	39	+4	42	Advance to promotional play-offs
6	North Sunshine Eagles	26	12	3	11	51	40	+11	39	Advance to promotional play-offs
7	Melbourne Srbija	26	10	7	9	45	38	+7	37	Advance to promotional play-offs
8	Bulleen Lions	26	10	3	13	35	41	−6	33	
9	Northcote City	26	9	5	12	45	44	+1	32	
10	Langwarrin SC	26	9	2	15	37	54	−17	29	
11	Manningham United Blues	26	6	7	13	35	65	−30	25	
12	Eastern Lions (R)	26	6	4	16	36	58	−22	22	Relegation to Victoria Premier League 2
13	Kingston City (R)	26	5	6	15	44	69	−25	21	Relegation to Victoria Premier League 2
14	Moreland City (R)	26	6	2	18	36	75	−39	20	Relegation to Victoria Premier League 2

Rules for classification: 1) Points; 2) Goal difference; 3) Goals scored
(C) Champions; (P) Promoted; (R) Relegated

==== Promotional play-offs ====
Due to the removal of Western United Youth, teams placed third, fifth, sixth and seventh in the regular season compete in the play-offs. Melbourne City Youth would be promoted to the National Premier Leagues Victoria in 2026 by beating Brunswick City on penalties in the promotion play-off final.

Semi-finals
3	Melbourne City Youth	4
7	Melbourne Srbija	3
5	Brunswick City (a.e.t.)	3
6	North Sunshine Eagles	1

Final
3	Melbourne City Youth (p)	2 (3)
5	Brunswick City	2 (1)

=== 2025 Victoria Premier League 2 ===
Victoria Premier League 2
- Season: 2025
- Dates: 7 February – 14 September 2025
- Champions: North Geelong Warriors
- Promoted: North Geelong Warriors; Eltham Redbacks; Brunswick Juventus
- Relegated: Boroondara-Carey Eagles; Geelong; Pascoe Vale
- Matches: 132
- Goals: 594 (4.5 per match)
- Top goalscorer: Sonny Brimmer (16)
- Biggest home win: Goulburn Valley Suns 5-0 Geelong (5 April 2025)
- Biggest away win: Boroondara-Carey Eagles 0-5 Essendon Royals (10 May 2025); Whittlesea United 0-5 Essendon Royals (15 August 2025)
- All statistics correct as of 28 September 2025.

North Geelong Warriors were crowned 2025 VPL 2 champions and gained Promotion alongside Eltham Redbacks and promotion play-off winner Brunswick Juventus. Boroondara-Carey Eagles, Geelong SC and Pascoe Vale were relegated to Victorian State League 1.

==== Regular season ====
Pos	Team	Pld	W	D	L	GF	GA	GD	Pts	Promotion, qualification or relegation
1	North Geelong Warriors (C, P)	26	18	4	4	68	44	+24	58	Promotion to the Victoria Premier League 1
2	Eltham Redbacks (P)	26	16	5	5	57	31	+26	53	Promotion to the Victoria Premier League 1
3	Brunswick Juventus (O, P)	26	12	8	6	43	39	+4	44	Qualified for the VPL1 Promotion play-offs
4	Altona City	26	13	1	12	41	48	−7	40	Qualified for the VPL1 Promotion play-offs
5	Springvale White Eagles	26	10	9	7	40	26	+14	39	Qualified for the VPL1 Promotion play-offs
6	Goulburn Valley Suns	26	11	6	9	52	42	+10	39	Qualified for the VPL1 Promotion play-offs
7	Essendon Royals	26	11	5	10	53	44	+9	38	
8	Box Hill United	26	10	3	13	32	43	−11	33	
9	Werribee City	26	8	7	11	28	37	−9	31	
10	Whittlesea United	26	9	2	15	40	57	−17	29	
11	Nunawading City	26	7	6	13	39	41	−2	27	
12	Boroondara-Carey Eagles (R)	26	6	9	11	39	47	−8	27	Relegation to Victorian State League 1
13	Geelong SC (R)	26	6	8	12	30	41	−11	26	Relegation to Victorian State League 1
14	Pascoe Vale (R)	26	6	5	15	32	54	−22	23	Relegation to Victorian State League 1

Rules for classification: 1) Points; 2) Goal difference; 3) Goals scored
(C) Champions; (O) Play-off winners; (P) Promoted; (R) Relegated

==== Promotional play-offs ====
Brunswick Juventus would be promoted to the National Premier Leagues Victoria in 2026 by beating Springvale White Eagles on penalties in the promotion play-off final.

Semi-finals
3	Brunswick Juventus	2
6	Goulburn Valley Suns	1
4	Altona City	0(4)
5	Springvale White Eagles	0(5)

Promotion Grand Final
3	Brunswick Juventus	1
5	Springvale White Eagles	0

== Women's Football ==
=== 2025 National Premier Leagues Victoria Women ===
National Premier Leagues Victoria Women
- Season: 2025
- Dates: 14 March 2025 – 13 September 2025
- Champions: Box Hill United
- Premiers: Heidelberg United
- Matches: 132
- Goals: 457 (3.46 per match)
- Top goalscorer: Sawa Matsuda (18)
- Biggest home win: Bulleen Lions 8–0 Brunswick Juventus (30 August 2025)
- Biggest away win: Boroondara-Carey Eagles 0–5 South Melbourne (30 August 2025)
- Highest scoring: South Melbourne 7–2 FV Academy (22 March 2025); Box Hill United 7–2 Preston Lions (30 August 2025)
- Longest winning run: 9 matches Box Hill United; Heidelberg United
- Longest unbeaten run: 13 matches Heidelberg United
- Longest winless run: 9 matches Bentleigh Greens
- Longest losing run: 9 matches Bentleigh Greens
- All statistics correct as of 13 September 2025. (Note: Longest runs only include regular season results)

Heidleberg United Would be crowned NPL Victoria Women's Premier's and Box Hill United also were crowned NPL Victoria Women's Champions.

==== Regular season ====
Pos	Team	Pld	W	D	L	GF	GA	GD	Pts	Qualification or relegation
1	Heidelberg United	22	16	2	4	52	31	+21	50	Qualification for finals series
2	Bulleen Lions	22	14	3	5	57	29	+28	45	Qualification for finals series
3	Box Hill United (C)	21	12	4	5	46	29	+17	40	Qualification for finals series
4	Essendon Royals	22	12	2	8	49	38	+11	38	Qualification for finals series
5	South Melbourne	22	10	7	5	43	25	+18	37	
6	Alamein	22	11	2	9	33	28	+5	35	
7	Boroondara-Carey Eagles	22	9	2	11	32	39	−7	29	
8	Spring Hills	22	7	7	8	31	31	0	28	
9	Preston Lions FC	22	6	5	11	34	43	−9	23	
10	FV Academy	22	5	5	12	33	65	−32	20	
11	Benleigh Greens (R)	21	4	2	15	27	40	−13	14	Relegation to VPLW
12	Brunswick Juventus (R)	22	4	1	17	20	59	−39	13	Relegation to VPLW

Updated to match(es) played on 13 September 2025. Source: NPL VIC Women
Rules for classification: 1) Points; 2) Goal difference; 3) Goals scored
(C) Champions; (R) Relegated

==== Finals Series ====
Box Hill United would beat Heidleberg United 2–1 in the NPL Victoria Women's Grand Final.

Semi-finals
1	Heidelberg United	1
4	Essendon Royals	0
2	Bulleen Lions	1
3	Box Hill United	3

Grand Final
1	Heidelberg United	1
3	Box Hill United	2

== Cup Competitions ==
=== 2025 Dockerty Cup ===
South Melbourne won the Dockerty Cup for the tenth time, defeating Heidelberg United 2–1 in the final held on 9 August 2025.

9 August 2025	Heidelberg United	1–2	South Melbourne	Melbourne
16:00 AEST (UTC+10:00)	Yokokawa 5'	Report	Dovison 47', 90+5'	Stadium: Home of the Matildas
