= 2024 Football Victoria season =

Football Victoria
- Season: 2024
- Dates: 11 February – 22 September 2024
- Champions: Oakleigh Cannons
- Premiers: South Melbourne
- Dockety Cup Champion: South Melbourne
- FV Community Shield champion: Avondale FC

The 2024 Football Victoria season was the 113th season of competitive soccer in Victoria.

The premier of the top tier of Victorian football was South Melbourne, which would later lose to Oakleigh Cannons in the NPL Victoria Grand Final, making Oakleigh the 2024 NPL Victoria champions. South Melbourne also beat Oakleigh on penalties to win the 2024 Dockerty Cup.

== League competitions ==
League	Promoted to league	Relegated from league
NPL	Dandenong City Manningham united blues	Bentleigh Greens North Geelong Warriors
VPL 1	Caroline Springs George Cross Melbourne Victory Youth	Brunswick Juventus Pascoe Vale
VPL 2	Altona City Melbourne Srbija	Geelong SC Ballarat City

=== 2024 National Premier Leagues Victoria ===
National Premier Leagues Victoria
- Season: 2024
- Champions: Oakleigh Cannons
- Premiers: South Melbourne
- Relegated: Manningham United Blues; Moreland City
- Matches: 182
- Goals: 615 (3.38 per match)
- Top goalscorer: Alex Salmon (18 goals)
- Biggest home win: Heidelberg United 6–0 St Albans Saints (5 April); Melbourne Knights 6–0 Moreland City (21 June); Dandenong City 7–1 Moreland City (28 June)
- Biggest away win: Dandenong Thunder 0–8 Avondale FC (20 April)
- Highest scoring: Altona Magic 6–3 Moreland City (27 July)
- All statistics correct as of 20 August 2024.

South Melbourne were crowned premiers of NPL Victoria.

==== Regular season ====
Pos	Team	Pld	W	D	L	GF	GA	GD	Pts	Qualification or relegation
1	South Melbourne	26	19	3	4	53	20	+33	60	2024 NPL Victoria Finals
2	Avondale FC	26	16	6	4	65	29	+36	54	2024 NPL Victoria Finals
3	Oakleigh Cannons (C)	26	16	5	5	53	28	+25	53	2024 NPL Victoria Finals
4	Heidelberg United	26	14	9	3	46	21	+25	51	2024 NPL Victoria Finals
5	Hume City	26	15	5	6	50	29	+21	50	2024 NPL Victoria Finals
6	Dandenong City	26	11	4	11	50	51	−1	37	2024 NPL Victoria Finals
7	Melbourne Knights	26	10	5	11	43	37	+6	35	
8	Altona Magic	26	10	3	13	43	50	−7	33	
9	Port Melbourne	26	9	6	11	41	52	−11	33	
10	Dandenong Thunder	26	8	4	14	29	51	−22	28	
11	St Albans Saints	26	8	1	17	30	54	−24	25	
12	Green Gully	26	6	6	14	34	53	−19	24	
13	Manningham United Blues (R)	26	5	3	18	42	72	−30	18	Relegation to the National Premier Leagues Victoria 2
14	Moreland City (R)	26	4	2	20	36	68	−32	14	Relegation to the National Premier Leagues Victoria 2

Rules for classification: 1) points; 2) goal difference; 3) number of goals scored.
(C) Champions; (R) Relegated

==== Finals series ====
Elimination finals
4	Heidelberg United	1 (4)
5	Hume City (p)	1 (5)
3	Oakleigh Cannons	4
6	Dandenong City	1

Preliminary finals
1	South Melbourne (a.e.t.)	1
5	Hume City	0
2	Avondale FC	0
3	Oakleigh Cannons	3

Grand final
1	South Melbourne	0
3	Oakleigh Cannons	1

=== 2024 Victoria Premier League 1 ===
Victoria Premier League 1
- Season: 2024
- Dates: 9 February – 18 August 2024
- Champions: Melbourne Victory Youth
- Promoted: Melbourne Victory Youth; Preston Lions
- Relegated: North Geelong Warriors; Werribee City
- Matches: 182
- Goals: 645 (3.54 per match)
- Top goalscorer: Archibald Macphee (16); Michael Domfeh
- Biggest home win: Western United Youth 7-0 Langwarrin (28 April 2024)
- Biggest away win: Bentleigh Greens 1-7 Western United Youth (1 March 2024)
- Highest scoring: Bulleen Lions 5-5 Melbourne Victory Youth (29 July 2024)
- All statistics correct as of 18 August 2024.

Melbourne Victory Youth was crowned VPL 1 Champion, gained promotion alongside Preston Lions. Werribee City and North Geelong Warriors were relegated to VPL 2.

Pos	Team	Pld	W	D	L	GF	GA	GD	Pts	Promotion, qualification or relegation
1	Melbourne Victory Youth (C, P)	26	15	7	4	66	39	+27	52	Promotion to NPL Victoria
2	Preston Lions (P)	26	15	5	6	53	39	+14	50	Promotion to NPL Victoria
3	Western United Youth	26	15	4	7	78	41	+37	49	
4	Northcote City	26	13	7	6	51	37	+14	46	
5	Melbourne City Youth	26	11	8	7	55	41	+14	41	
6	Bulleen Lions	26	9	10	7	42	43	−1	37	
7	Caroline Springs George Cross	26	10	6	10	39	39	0	36	
8	Bentleigh Greens	26	10	5	11	42	45	−3	35	
9	Langwarrin SC	26	9	7	10	46	53	−7	34	
10	Eastern Lions	26	8	6	12	32	47	−15	30	
11	Brunswick City	26	8	5	13	43	46	−3	29	
12	Kingston City	26	7	7	12	39	54	−15	28	
13	Werribee City (R)	26	3	9	14	30	64	−34	18	Relegation to VPL 2
14	North Geelong Warriors (R)	26	4	4	18	29	57	−28	16	Relegation to VPL 2

Rules for classification: 1) Points; 2) Goal difference; 3) Goals scored
(C) Champions; (P) Promoted; (R) Relegated

=== 2024 Victoria Premier League 2 ===
Victoria Premier League 2
- Season: 2024
- Dates: 8 March – 17 August 2024
- Champions: Melbourne Srbija
- Promoted: Melbourne Srbija; North Sunshine Eagles
- Relegated: Doveton SC; Beaumaris SC
- Matches: 132
- Goals: 424 (3.21 per match)
- Top goalscorer: Prince Jordan Adeyemi (15); Callum Schorah
- Biggest home win: Pascoe Vale 8-1 Beaumaris SC (15 March 2024)
- Biggest away win: Brunswick Juventus 1-6 Altona City (9 August 2024); Doveton SC 0-5 North Sunshine Eagles (9 March 2024)
- Highest scoring: Pascoe Vale 8-1 Beaumaris SC (15 March 2024)
- All statistics correct as of 21 August 2024.

Melbourne Srbija were crowned 2024 VPL 2 champions and gained Promotion alongside North Sunshine Eagles. Doverton SC and Beamaris SC were relegated to VPL 1.

Pos	Team	Pld	W	D	L	GF	GA	GD	Pts	Promotion, qualification or relegation
1	Melbourne Srbija	22	14	3	5	40	22	+18	45	Promotion to VPL 1
2	North Sunshine Eagles	22	11	10	1	52	27	+25	43	Promotion to VPL 1
3	Altona City	22	11	7	4	37	24	+13	40	
4	Essendon Royals	22	11	5	6	44	31	+13	38	
5	Pascoe Vale	22	11	2	9	42	29	+13	35	
6	Brunswick Juventus	22	10	4	8	34	35	−1	34	
7	Boroondara-Carey Eagles	22	7	7	8	34	39	−5	28	
8	Box Hill United	22	6	6	10	23	31	−8	24	
9	Nunawading City	22	7	3	12	37	46	−9	24	
10	Goulburn Valley Suns	22	6	5	11	40	44	−4	23	
11	Doveton SC	22	6	3	13	22	43	−21	21	Relegation to Victorian State League Division 1
12	Beaumaris SC	22	3	3	16	19	53	−34	12	Relegation to Victorian State League Division 1

Rules for classification: 1) Points; 2) Goal difference; 3) Goals scored

== Cup Competitions ==
=== 2024 Dockerty Cup ===
Football Victoria clubs competed in 2024 for the Dockerty Cup. The tournament doubled as the Victorian qualifiers for the 2024 Australia Cup, with the top five clubs progressing to the Round of 32. A total of 219 clubs entered the qualifying phase, with the clubs entering in a staggered format.

The Cup was won by South Melbourne for the ninth time.

In addition to the three A-League clubs (Melbourne Victory, Melbourne City and Western United), four NPL Victoria teams (Heidelberg United, Hume City, South Melbourne, and Oakleigh Cannons), and one VPL 2 team (Melbourne Serbija) competed in the final rounds of the 2024 Australia Cup.

==== Grand Final ====
Grand Final
3 August 2024
15:00 AEST (UTC+10:00)

Oakleigh Cannons	0–0 (a.e.t.)	South Melbourne
	Report
Penalties
	4–5

The Home of the Matildas, Melbourne
