= 2018 Football Federation Victoria season =

Football Federation Victoria
- Season: 2018

The 2018 Football Federation Victoria season was the fifth season under the new competition format for state-level soccer in Victoria. The competition consists of seven divisions across the state of Victoria.

== League Tables ==
=== 2018 National Premier Leagues Victoria ===
NPL Victoria
- Season: 2018
- Champions: Heidelberg United
- Premiers: Heidelberg United
- Relegated: Northcote City; Bulleen Lions
- Matches: 182
- Goals: 602 (3.31 per match)
- Top goalscorer: Brandon Barnes (22 goals)
- Biggest home win: Heidelberg United 6-1 Kingston City FC; Heidelberg United 6-1 Port Melbourne SC
- Biggest away win: Dandenong Thunder SC 0–9 South Melbourne FC
- Highest scoring: Dandenong Thunder SC 0–9 South Melbourne FC

The 2018 season was played over 26 rounds. As Premiers, Heidelberg United qualified for the 2018 National Premier Leagues finals series, competing with the other state federation champions in a final knockout tournament to decide the National Premier Leagues 2018 Champion.

Pos	Team	Pld	W	D	L	GF	GA	GD	Pts	Qualification or relegation
1	Heidelberg United (C)	26	19	2	5	60	29	+31	59	2018 National Premier Leagues Finals
2	Bentleigh Greens	26	18	4	4	53	28	+25	58	2018 Victoria Finals
3	Pascoe Vale	26	13	6	7	42	31	+11	45	2018 Victoria Finals
4	Oakleigh Cannons	26	12	2	12	41	39	+2	38	2018 Victoria Finals
5	Avondale FC	26	17	4	5	57	32	+25	37 (Note: Avondale FC had eighteen points deducted for licence breaches in the 2018 and 2019 seasons.)	2018 Victoria Finals
6	Port Melbourne	26	10	6	10	37	41	−4	36	2018 Victoria Finals
7	Kingston City	26	10	4	12	39	45	−6	34	
8	Dandenong Thunder	26	11	1	14	45	55	−10	34	
9	Melbourne Knights	26	9	5	12	45	53	−8	32	
10	South Melbourne	26	8	4	14	48	53	−5	28	
11	Hume City	26	7	7	12	29	43	−14	28	
12	Green Gully	26	7	5	14	41	49	−8	26	2018 relegation play-offs
13	Northcote City (R)	26	5	7	14	32	53	−21	22	Relegation to the 2019 NPL Victoria 2
14	Bulleen Lions (R)	26	6	3	17	33	51	−18	21	Relegation to the 2019 NPL Victoria 2

Source: sportstg.com
Rules for classification: 1) points; 2) goal difference; 3) number of goals scored.
(C) Champions; (R) Relegated

==== Finals ====
Elimination Finals
3	Avondale FC	3
6	Port Melbourne	1
4	Pascoe Vale	1
5	Oakleigh Cannons	2

Semi-finals
1	Heidelberg United	1 (5)
5	Oakleigh Cannons	1 (3)
2	Bentleigh Greens	3
3	Avondale FC (a.e.t.)	4

Final
1	Heidelberg United	2
3	Avondale FC	1

==== Promotion/relegation play-off ====
East vs West			Promotion/relegation play-off
			12	Green Gully (a.e.t.)	3
E2	Moreland City	4	E2	Moreland City	2
W2	St Albans Saints	1

=== 2018 National Premier Leagues Victoria 2 ===
NPL Victoria 2
- Season: 2018
- Champions: Dandenong City
- Premiers: Altona Magic (West), Dandenong City (East)
- Relegated: Sunshine George Cross, Nunawading City
- Matches: 280
- Goals: 926 (3.31 per match)
- Top goalscorer: Apai Ukuno (18 goals)

The 2018 National Premier Leagues Victoria 2 season was played over 28 rounds with each team playing the teams in their conference twice and the other conference once. The top team at the end of the season was promoted to National Premier Leagues Victoria, while the second placed team entered the promotion play-off.

==== NPL 2 West ====
Pos	Team	Pld	W	D	L	GF	GA	GD	Pts	Promotion or relegation
1	Altona Magic (P)	28	19	5	4	67	20	+47	62	Promotion to the 2019 NPL Victoria
2	St Albans Saints	28	15	6	7	48	32	+16	51	2018 promotion play-offs
3	North Geelong Warriors	28	16	4	8	43	38	+5	49 (Note: North Geelong Warriors had three points deducted as a result of a melee after a game in June 2018.)	
4	Moreland Zebras	28	12	9	7	48	32	+16	45	
5	Werribee City	28	14	2	12	45	39	+6	44	
6	Whittlesea Ranges	28	11	5	12	42	42	0	38	
7	Melbourne Victory Youth	28	11	4	13	48	54	−6	34 (Note: Melbourne Victory Youth had three points deducted as a result of a melee after a game in June 2018.)	
8	Brunswick City	28	9	6	13	36	57	−21	33	
9	Ballarat City	28	9	4	15	44	56	−12	31	
10	Sunshine George Cross (R)	28	6	9	13	38	70	−32	27	Relegation to the 2019 State League 1

Source: sportstg.com
Rules for classification: 1) points; 2) goal difference; 3) number of goals scored.
(P) Promoted; (R) Relegated

==== NPL 2 East ====
Pos	Team	Pld	W	D	L	GF	GA	GD	Pts	Promotion or relegation
1	Dandenong City (P)	28	19	4	5	63	33	+30	61	Promotion to the 2019 NPL Victoria
2	Moreland City	28	15	8	5	68	24	+44	53	2018 promotion play-offs
3	Eastern Lions	28	13	3	12	43	34	+9	42	
4	Springvale White Eagles	28	11	6	11	41	47	−6	39	
5	Goulburn Valley Suns	28	11	5	12	57	55	+2	38	
6	Melbourne City Youth	28	10	4	14	60	59	+1	34	
7	Box Hill United	28	9	3	16	33	54	−21	30	
8	Langwarrin	28	8	5	15	35	57	−22	29	
9	Murray United	28	8	4	16	35	49	−14	28	
10	Nunawading City (R)	28	4	4	20	32	74	−42	16	Relegation to the 2019 State League 1

Source: sportstg.com
(P) Promoted; (R) Relegated

==== NPL 2 Grand Final ====
24 September 2018

Dandenong City	3–1	Altona Magic
Stirton 15'; Filipovic 56'; Salcin 61' (pen.)	Report	Naumoski 72'

ABD Stadium
Referee: Bruno D'Aniello

=== 2018 State League 1 ===
==== North-West ====
Pos	Team	Pld	W	D	L	GF	GA	GD	Pts	Promotion or relegation
1	Geelong (P)	22	14	4	4	33	14	+19	46	Promotion to the 2019 NPL Victoria 2
2	North Sunshine Eagles	22	14	2	6	34	14	+20	44	
3	Preston Lions	22	12	5	5	47	20	+27	41	
4	Keilor Park	22	10	5	7	31	27	+4	35	
5	Sydenham Park	22	10	3	9	30	35	−5	33	
6	Clifton Hill	22	8	6	8	43	37	+6	30	
7	Banyule City	22	7	7	8	35	34	+1	28	
8	Yarraville	22	8	4	10	26	27	−1	28	
9	Altona City	22	6	9	7	27	28	−1	27	
10	Essendon Royals	22	6	4	12	29	45	−16	22	
11	Hoppers Crossing (R)	22	5	5	12	23	47	−24	20	Relegation to the 2019 State League 2
12	Western Suburbs (R)	22	3	4	15	27	57	−30	13	Relegation to the 2019 State League 2

Source: sportstg.com
Rules for classification: 1) points; 2) goal difference; 3) number of goals scored.
(P) Promoted; (R) Relegated

==== South-East ====
Pos	Team	Pld	W	D	L	GF	GA	GD	Pts	Promotion or relegation
1	Manningham United (P)	21	17	1	3	61	18	+43	52	Promotion to the 2019 NPL Victoria 2
2	Richmond	21	15	3	3	59	22	+37	48	
3	Mornington	21	10	4	7	37	28	+9	34	
4	Caulfield United Cobras	21	9	5	7	34	30	+4	32	
5	Warragul United	21	7	6	8	29	40	−11	27	
6	Beaumaris	21	6	8	7	33	30	+3	26	
7	Casey Comets	21	6	6	9	35	44	−9	24	
8	St Kilda SC	21	6	5	10	24	34	−10	23	
9	Eltham Redbacks	21	6	4	11	26	34	−8	22	
10	Malvern City	21	6	4	11	26	38	−12	22	
11	South Springvale (R)	21	6	1	14	26	64	−38	19	Relegation to the 2019 State League 2
12	Morwell Pegasus (R)	11	2	3	6	20	28	−8	9	Withdrew from the league after eleven rounds

Source: sportstg.com
Rules for classification: 1) points; 2) goal difference; 3) number of goals scored.
(P) Promoted; (R) Relegated

=== 2018 State League 2 ===
==== North-West ====
Pos	Team	Pld	W	D	L	GF	GA	GD	Pts	Promotion or relegation
1	Whittlesea United (C, P)	22	15	4	3	57	24	+33	49	Promotion to the 2019 State League 1
2	Brimbank Stallions (P)	22	14	5	3	66	29	+37	47	Promotion to the 2019 State League 1
3	Corio	22	12	6	4	36	26	+10	42	
4	Cairnlea FC	22	13	2	7	36	32	+4	41	
5	Westgate FC	22	13	1	8	44	20	+24	40	
6	Fitzroy City	22	10	4	8	35	32	+3	34	
7	Hume United	22	10	4	8	25	26	−1	34	
8	Altona East Phoenix	22	6	5	11	22	32	−10	23	
9	Geelong Rangers	22	7	2	13	29	43	−14	23	
10	Mill Park	22	6	2	14	32	39	−7	20	
11	Westvale (R)	22	5	2	15	25	53	−28	17	Relegation to the 2019 State League 3
12	Diamond Valley United (R)	22	1	3	18	12	63	−51	6	Relegation to the 2019 State League 3

Source: sportstg.com
(C) Champions; (P) Promoted; (R) Relegated

==== South-East ====
Pos	Team	Pld	W	D	L	GF	GA	GD	Pts	Promotion or relegation
1	Doveton (C, P)	22	16	4	2	66	19	+47	52	Promotion to the 2019 State League 1
2	Mazenod Victory (P)	22	14	3	5	54	27	+27	45	Promotion to the 2019 State League 1
3	Brandon Park	22	13	6	3	51	27	+24	45	
4	Berwick City	22	11	6	5	41	29	+12	39	
5	Knox City	22	10	7	5	40	27	+13	37	
6	Doncaster Rovers	22	8	5	9	29	40	−11	29	
7	Mooroolbark	22	7	4	11	35	46	−11	25	
8	Old Scotch	22	7	4	11	32	51	−19	25	
9	Peninsula Strikers	22	6	3	13	36	55	−19	21	
10	North Caulfield	22	6	2	14	26	52	−26	20	
11	Heatherton United (R)	22	6	1	15	27	40	−13	19	Relegation to the 2019 State League 3
12	Frankston Pines (R)	22	5	1	16	25	49	−24	16	Relegation to the 2019 State League 3

Source: sportstg.com
(C) Champions; (P) Promoted; (R) Relegated

=== 2018 State League 3 ===
==== North-West ====
Pos	Team	Pld	W	D	L	GF	GA	GD	Pts	Promotion or relegation
1	Epping City (P)	22	15	3	4	56	22	+34	48	Promotion to the 2019 State League 1
2	Moreland United (P)	22	13	3	6	47	31	+16	42	Promotion to the 2019 State League 1
3	FC Strathmore	22	12	5	5	47	30	+17	41	
4	Sebastopol Vikings	22	12	4	6	40	31	+9	40	
5	Sunbury United	22	11	1	10	45	40	+5	34	
6	Williamstown	22	8	7	7	40	32	+8	31	
7	Point Cook SC	22	7	7	8	32	31	+1	28	
8	Upfield	22	8	4	10	25	29	−4	28	
9	Fawkner SC	22	7	5	10	45	51	−6	26	
10	Essendon United (R)	22	6	6	10	36	36	0	24	Relegation to the 2019 State League 4
11	Heidelberg Stars (R)	22	5	2	15	20	58	−38	17	Relegation to the 2019 State League 4
12	La Trobe University (R)	22	3	3	16	21	63	−42	12	Relegation to the 2019 State League 4

Source: sportstg.com
(P) Promoted; (R) Relegated

==== South-East ====
Pos	Team	Pld	W	D	L	GF	GA	GD	Pts	Promotion or relegation
1	Boroondara-Carey Eagles (P)	22	18	2	2	59	14	+45	56	Promotion to the 2019 State League 1
2	Monbulk Rangers (P)	22	13	4	5	44	30	+14	43	Promotion to the 2019 State League 1
3	Skye United	22	12	1	9	40	34	+6	37	
4	Brighton	22	11	3	8	42	26	+16	36	
5	South Yarra	22	11	3	8	30	32	−2	36	
6	Collingwood City	22	10	3	9	45	32	+13	33	
7	Bayside Argonauts	22	9	4	9	43	42	+1	31	
8	Whitehorse United	22	8	2	12	35	36	−1	26	
9	Middle Park	22	7	4	11	30	42	−12	25	
10	Noble Park United (R)	22	6	5	11	28	46	−18	23	Relegation to the 2019 State League 4
11	Seaford United (R)	22	5	2	15	24	63	−39	17	Relegation to the 2019 State League 4
12	Dingley Stars FC (R)	22	4	3	15	21	44	−23	15	Relegation to the 2019 State League 4

Source: sportstg.com
(P) Promoted; (R) Relegated

==== Promotion/relegation play-offs ====
North vs West			North-West play-off
			10	Essendon United	1
N2	Craigieburn City	2	N2	Craigieburn City	4
W2	Altona North	1

South vs East			South-East play-off
			10	Noble Park United	0
S2	Springvale City	0	E2	Elwood City	1
E2	Elwood City	1

=== 2018 Women's National Premier League ===
(Victoria (state)) PS4 Women's National Premier League
- Season: 2018
- Champions: Bulleen Lions
- Premiers: South Melbourne

The highest tier domestic football competition in Victoria for women is known for sponsorship reasons as the PS4 Women's National Premier League. This was the third season of the NPL Women's format. The 10 teams played each other 3 times for a total of 27 games.

Pos	Team	Pld	W	D	L	GF	GA	GD	Pts	Qualification or relegation
1	South Melbourne	27	20	3	4	112	35	+77	63	Finals series
2	Calder United	27	19	5	3	101	29	+72	62	Finals series
3	Bulleen Lions (C)	27	16	4	7	86	27	+59	52	Finals series
4	Alamein FC	27	15	3	9	80	40	+40	48	Finals series
5	Greater Geelong Galaxy	27	13	5	9	66	35	+31	44	
6	Bayside United	27	11	3	13	58	64	−6	36	
7	Box Hill United	27	10	4	13	53	61	−8	34	
8	Heidelberg United	27	7	3	17	34	73	−39	24	
9	Victorian Women's NTC	27	7	3	17	39	82	−43	24	
10	Southern United	27	0	1	26	5	188	−183	1	

Source: sportstg.com
Rules for classification: 1) points; 2) goal difference; 3) number of goals scored.
(C) Champions

==== Finals ====
Semi-finals
1	South Melbourne	4
4	Alamein FC	0
2	Calder United	0
3	Bulleen Lions	4

Grand Final
1	South Melbourne	1
3	Bulleen Lions	3

== Cup Competitions ==
=== 2018 Dockerty Cup ===
Football Victoria soccer clubs competed in 2018 for the Dockerty Cup. The tournament doubled as the Victorian qualifiers for the 2018 FFA Cup, with the top four clubs progressing to the Round of 32. A total of 216 clubs entered the qualifying phase, with the clubs entering in a staggered format.

The Cup was won by Bentleigh Greens.

In addition to the two A-League clubs (Melbourne Victory and Melbourne City), Heidelberg United (as the 2018 National Premier Leagues Champion), the four semi-finalists (Avondale, Bentleigh Greens, Northcote City and Port Melbourne) competed in the final rounds of the 2018 FFA Cup.
