= 2014 Football Federation Victoria season =

Football Federation Victoria
- Season: 2014

The 2014 Football Federation Victoria season was the first season under the new competition format for state-level football (soccer) in Victoria. The competition consists of seven divisions across the state of Victoria.

== League Tables ==
=== 2014 National Premier Leagues Victoria ===
NPL Victoria
- Season: 2014
- Champions: South Melbourne
- Relegated: Ballarat Red Devils; Goulburn Valley Suns
- Matches: 182
- Goals: 572 (3.14 per match)
- Top goalscorer: Milos Lujic (22 goals)

The 2014 National Premier Leagues Victoria season was played over 26 rounds, from March to September 2014. The overall premier of this division qualified for the 2014 National Premier Leagues finals series, competing with the other state federation champions in a final knockout tournament to decide the National Premier Leagues champion for 2014.

Pos	Team	Pld	W	D	L	GF	GA	GD	Pts	Qualification or relegation
1	South Melbourne (C)	26	21	3	2	59	22	+37	66	2014 National Premier Leagues Finals
2	Oakleigh Cannons	26	18	5	3	61	19	+42	59	
3	Heidelberg United	26	12	9	5	55	32	+23	45	
4	Bentleigh Greens	26	12	7	7	48	35	+13	43	
5	Melbourne Knights	26	12	2	12	41	36	+5	38	
6	Hume City	26	12	2	12	33	33	0	38	
7	Northcote City	26	10	6	10	38	39	−1	36	
8	Pascoe Vale	26	9	7	10	30	34	−4	34	
9	Green Gully	26	9	3	14	45	52	−7	30	
10	Dandenong Thunder	26	8	6	12	33	47	−14	30	
11	Port Melbourne	26	7	7	12	33	47	−14	28	
12	Werribee City	26	8	4	14	29	50	−21	28	
13	Ballarat Red Devils (R)	26	8	3	15	40	51	−11	27	Relegated to the 2015 NPL Victoria 1
14	Goulburn Valley Suns (R)	26	2	4	20	27	75	−48	10	Relegated to the 2015 NPL Victoria 1

Source: foxsportspulse.com
Rules for classification: 1) points; 2) goal difference; 3) number of goals scored.
(C) Champions; (R) Relegated

=== 2014 National Premier Leagues Victoria 1 ===
NPL Victoria 1
- Season: 2014
- Promoted: Avondale Heights; North Geelong Warriors
- Matches: 182
- Goals: 601 (3.3 per match)

The 2014 National Premier Leagues Victoria 1 was played over 26 rounds, beginning on 14 March and concluding on 28 September 2014. The top two teams at the end of the season were promoted to National Premier Leagues Victoria. No teams were relegated as the league is set to expand to 20 teams and two parallel divisions for the next season.

Pos	Team	Pld	W	D	L	GF	GA	GD	Pts	Qualification or relegation
1	Avondale Heights (P)	26	17	4	5	47	25	+22	55	Promoted to the 2015 NPL Victoria
2	North Geelong Warriors (P)	26	17	1	8	57	30	+27	52	Promoted to the 2015 NPL Victoria
3	Box Hill United	26	14	6	6	48	23	+25	48	
4	Richmond	26	15	3	8	62	43	+19	48	
5	Bulleen Lions	26	13	5	8	64	42	+22	44	
6	St Albans Saints	26	14	4	8	46	31	+15	43 (Note: St Albans Saints were deducted 3 points.)	
7	Moreland Zebras	26	12	3	11	45	37	+8	39	
8	Kingston City	26	11	2	13	54	46	+8	35	
9	Sunshine George Cross	26	10	5	11	43	55	−12	35	
10	Dandenong City	26	9	5	12	45	54	−9	32	
11	FC Bendigo	26	9	4	13	42	50	−8	31	
12	Springvale White Eagles	26	7	3	16	44	63	−19	24	
13	Whittlesea Ranges	26	6	4	16	38	69	−31	22	
14	Brunswick City	26	3	1	22	26	94	−68	10	

(P) Promoted

=== 2014 Victoria State League 1 ===
==== North-West ====
Victorian State League 1 North-West
- Season: 2014
- Relegated: Fitzroy City
- Matches: 132
- Goals: 448 (3.39 per match)

Pos	Team	Pld	W	D	L	GF	GA	GD	Pts	Qualification or relegation
1	Moreland City (P)	22	14	3	5	47	26	+21	45	Promoted to the 2015 NPL Victoria 1
2	Preston Lions	22	11	9	2	37	26	+11	42	
3	Fawkner Blues	22	12	2	8	46	31	+15	38	
4	Cairnlea FC	22	9	9	4	48	36	+12	36	
5	Sydenham Park	22	8	10	4	40	29	+11	34	
6	Western Suburbs	22	8	5	9	43	45	−2	29	
7	Altona Magic	22	9	4	9	31	33	−2	28 (Note: Altona Magic were deducted 3 points.)	
8	Keilor Park	22	7	5	10	38	41	−3	26	
9	Westgate FC	22	8	2	12	32	43	−11	26	
10	Sunbury United	22	8	2	12	33	46	−13	26	
11	Altona East Phoenix	22	6	6	10	33	42	−9	24	
12	Fitzroy City (R)	22	2	3	17	20	50	−30	9	Relegated to the 2015 State League 2

(P) Promoted; (R) Relegated

==== South-East ====
Victorian State League 1 South-East
- Season: 2014
- Relegated: Southern Stars
- Matches: 132
- Goals: 472 (3.58 per match)

Pos	Team	Pld	W	D	L	GF	GA	GD	Pts	Qualification or relegation
1	Eastern Lions (P)	22	18	0	4	42	17	+25	54	Promoted to the 2015 NPL Victoria 1
2	Mornington	22	16	2	4	85	30	+55	50	
3	Langwarrin	22	16	1	5	51	32	+19	49	
4	Noble Park United	22	13	1	8	38	42	−4	40	
5	Malvern City	22	9	6	7	43	32	+11	33	
6	South Springvale	22	8	8	6	38	30	+8	32	
7	Morwell Pegasus	22	9	4	9	45	42	+3	31	
8	Clifton Hill	22	6	6	10	42	49	−7	24	
9	Casey Comets	22	7	3	12	26	35	−9	24	
10	Diamond Valley United	22	4	8	10	30	44	−14	20	
11	Doncaster Rovers	22	2	2	18	15	60	−45	8	
12	Southern Stars (R)	22	2	3	17	17	59	−42	1 (Note: Southern Stars were deducted 8 points.)	Relegated to the 2015 State League 2

(P) Promoted; (R) Relegated

=== 2014 Victoria State League 2 ===
==== North-West ====
Victorian State League 2 North-West
- Season: 2014
- Relegated: La Trobe University
- Matches: 132
- Goals: 456 (3.45 per match)

Pos	Team	Pld	W	D	L	GF	GA	GD	Pts	Qualification or relegation
1	North Sunshine Eagles (P)	22	15	4	3	52	26	+26	49	Promoted to the 2015 State League 1
2	Corio (P)	22	15	3	4	53	23	+30	48	Promoted to the 2015 State League 1
3	Yarraville	22	13	3	6	44	20	+24	42	
4	Westvale SC	22	11	7	4	51	25	+26	40	
5	Moreland United	22	12	4	6	40	34	+6	40	
6	Geelong	22	10	2	10	37	42	−5	32	
7	Sporting Whittlesea	22	9	4	9	32	39	−7	31	
8	Banyule City	22	6	5	11	37	44	−7	23	
9	Heidelberg Stars	22	5	4	13	27	35	−8	19	
10	Hume United	22	6	3	13	29	56	−27	18 (Note: Hume United were deducted 3 points.)	
11	Melbourne University	22	4	3	15	24	46	−22	15	
12	La Trobe University (R)	22	4	2	16	30	66	−36	14	Relegated to the 2015 State League 3

(P) Promoted; (R) Relegated

==== South-East ====
Victorian State League 2 South-East
- Season: 2014
- Relegated: Nunawading City
- Matches: 132
- Goals: 457 (3.46 per match)

Pos	Team	Pld	W	D	L	GF	GA	GD	Pts	Qualification or relegation
1	Frankston Pines (P)	22	11	9	2	47	31	+16	42	Promoted to the 2015 State League 1
2	Warragul United (P)	22	12	4	6	48	30	+18	40	Promoted to the 2015 State League 1
3	Beaumaris	22	12	4	6	42	31	+11	40	
4	Berwick City	22	11	3	8	44	28	+16	36	
5	Mooroolbark	22	10	6	6	33	29	+4	36	
6	Heatherton United	22	10	5	7	33	35	−2	35	
7	Doveton	22	10	3	9	40	32	+8	33	
8	Old Scotch	22	7	8	7	38	31	+7	29	
9	North Caulfield	22	6	6	10	26	35	−9	24	
10	Seaford United	22	6	4	12	48	59	−11	22	
11	Peninsula Strikers	22	6	4	12	27	49	−22	22	
12	Nunawading City	22	1	4	17	31	67	−36	7	Team withdrew at end of season

(P) Promoted

=== 2014 Victoria State League 3 ===
==== North-West ====
Victorian State League 3 North-West
- Season: 2014

Pos	Team	Pld	W	D	L	GF	GA	GD	Pts	Qualification or relegation
1	Essendon Royals (P)	21	15	3	3	50	21	+29	48	Promoted to the 2015 State League 2
2	Essendon United (P)	21	11	1	9	36	28	+8	34	Promoted to the 2015 State League 2
3	Altona City	21	10	3	8	34	30	+4	33	
4	Old Carey	21	10	3	8	48	45	+3	33	
5	Lalor United	21	10	0	11	35	42	−7	30	
6	Western Eagles	21	7	5	9	30	32	−2	26	
7	Geelong Rangers	21	7	5	9	37	41	−4	26	
8	Whittlesea United	21	8	2	11	35	43	−8	26	
9	Williamstown SC	21	7	3	11	30	40	−10	24	
10	Brunswick Zebras	21	5	5	11	45	52	−7	20	
11	North City Wolves	21	5	4	12	31	60	−29	19	
12	Northern Roosters	11	8	2	1	35	20	+15	0	Team withdrew mid-season

(P) Promoted

==== South-East ====
Victorian State League 3 South-East
- Season: 2014

Pos	Team	Pld	W	D	L	GF	GA	GD	Pts	Qualification or relegation
1	Sandringham (P)	22	13	6	3	48	24	+24	45	Promoted to the 2015 State League 2
2	Old Melburnians (P)	22	13	3	6	47	26	+21	42	Promoted to the 2015 State League 2
3	Caulfield United Cobras	22	13	2	7	49	33	+16	41	
4	Knox City	22	11	6	5	43	31	+12	39	
5	Riversdale	22	9	6	7	39	31	+8	33	
6	East Brighton United	22	10	3	9	41	45	−4	33	
7	Monbulk Rangers	22	9	5	8	47	37	+10	32	
8	Middle Park	22	8	4	10	42	47	−5	28	
9	South Yarra	22	8	3	11	40	46	−6	27	
10	Ashburton United	22	7	6	9	34	44	−10	27	
11	Elwood City (R)	22	4	1	17	27	65	−38	13	Relegated to 2015 State League 4
12	Monash University (R)	22	2	5	15	31	59	−28	11	Relegated to 2015 State League 4

(P) Promoted; (R) Relegated

==== Promotion play-off ====
26 September 2014
20:00

Darebin United	1–0 (a.e.t.)	Melbourne City

State Football Centre, Thornbury

29 September 2014
20:00

Skye United	1–4	Mazenod United

Knox Regional Football Centre, Wantirna South

=== 2014 Victoria State League 4 ===
==== North ====
Victorian State League 4 North
- Season: 2014

Pos	Team	Pld	W	D	L	GF	GA	GD	Pts	Qualification or relegation
1	Upfield SC (P)	22	16	2	4	49	31	+18	50	Promoted to the 2015 State League 3
2	Darebin United (P)	22	14	1	7	50	30	+20	43	Qualification to the 2014 Promotion play-offs
3	Fawkner SC	22	12	2	8	60	36	+24	38	
4	Epping City	22	11	3	8	45	29	+16	36	
6	Bundoora United	22	9	5	8	36	36	0	32	
5	West Preston SC	22	9	5	8	33	41	−8	32	
7	Watsonia Heights FC	22	8	5	9	48	44	+4	29	
8	Parkville Panthers	22	9	2	11	38	44	−6	29	
9	Heidelberg Eagles	22	7	5	10	31	45	−14	26	
10	Plenty Valley Lions	22	7	3	12	44	45	−1	24	
11	Northern Falcons	22	6	5	11	31	34	−3	23	
12	Meadow Park Eagles (R)	22	3	4	15	19	69	−50	13	Relegated to the 2015 State League 5

(P) Promoted; (R) Relegated

==== West ====
Victorian State League 4 West
- Season: 2014

Pos	Team	Pld	W	D	L	GF	GA	GD	Pts	Qualification or relegation
1	Hoppers Crossing SC (P)	22	19	2	1	67	17	+50	59	Promotion to 2015 State League 3
2	Melbourne City	22	13	4	5	46	31	+15	43	Qualification to 2014 promotion play-offs
3	FC Strathmore	22	11	4	7	48	42	+6	37	
4	Maribyrnong Greens	22	9	6	7	42	36	+6	33	
5	Melton Phoenix	22	10	2	10	30	40	−10	32	
6	Bell Park SC	22	9	3	10	33	37	−4	30	
7	Point Cook FC	22	9	3	10	42	49	−7	30	
8	Surf Coast FC	22	7	6	9	41	47	−6	27	
9	Sebastopol Vikings	22	6	7	9	34	34	0	25	
10	Brimbank Stallions	22	7	3	12	43	45	−2	24	
11	Altona North SC	22	6	5	11	29	42	−13	23	
12	Laverton Park	22	1	5	16	17	52	−35	8	

(P) Promoted

==== South ====
Victorian State League 4 South
- Season: 2014

Pos	Team	Pld	W	D	L	GF	GA	GD	Pts	Qualification or relegation
1	St Kilda SC (P)	22	17	2	3	63	20	+43	53	Promotion to the 2015 State League 3
2	Skye United	22	16	0	6	51	30	+21	48	Qualification to the 2014 Promotion play-offs
3	Brighton SC	22	14	4	4	54	28	+26	46	
4	Keysborough SC	22	15	1	6	55	31	+24	46	
5	Noble Park SC	22	12	1	9	38	37	+1	37	
6	Bayside Argonauts	22	11	1	10	43	40	+3	34	
7	Endeavour United	22	6	4	12	30	34	−4	22	
8	Lyndale United	22	7	2	13	35	55	−20	23	
9	Dandenong Wolves	22	7	0	15	35	65	−30	21	
10	Sandown Lions	22	7	2	13	37	53	−16	23	
11	Hampton Park United	22	7	1	14	39	43	−4	22	
12	Old Mentonians SC (R)	22	3	2	17	21	65	−44	11	Relegated to the 2015 State League 5

(P) Promoted; (R) Relegated

==== East ====
Victorian State League 4 East
- Season: 2014

Pos	Team	Pld	W	D	L	GF	GA	GD	Pts	Qualification or relegation
1	Croydon City (P)	22	17	3	2	54	18	+36	54	Promotion to the 2015 State League 3
2	Mazenod United (P)	22	15	5	2	48	15	+33	50	Qualification to the 2014 Promotion play-offs
3	Old Camberwell Grammarians	22	14	2	6	61	34	+27	44	
4	Ringwood City	22	12	2	8	46	37	+9	38	
5	Waverley Wanderers	22	10	3	9	37	34	+3	33	
6	Whitehorse United	22	10	2	10	48	45	+3	32	
7	Collingwood City FC	22	10	1	11	47	50	−3	31	
8	Boroondara Eagles	22	8	3	11	30	38	−8	27	
9	University of Melbourne SC	22	8	2	12	28	38	−10	26	
10	Rowville Eagles	22	7	1	14	49	64	−15	22	
11	Manningham United	22	6	1	15	25	44	−19	19	
12	Brandon Park SC (R)	22	1	3	18	16	72	−56	6	Relegated to the 2015 State League 5

(P) Promoted; (R) Relegated

=== 2014 Victoria State League 5 ===
==== North ====
Victorian State League 5 North
- Season: 2014

Pos	Team	Pld	W	D	L	GF	GA	GD	Pts	Qualification or relegation
1	Greenvale United (P)	21	16	1	4	72	22	+50	49	Promotion to the 2015 State League 4
2	Northern United (P)	21	16	1	4	60	28	+32	49	Promotion to the 2015 State League 4
3	Mill Park SC	21	15	3	3	64	17	+47	48	
4	Keon Park SC	21	11	5	5	63	36	+27	38	
5	Sporting Carlton	21	6	4	11	41	59	−18	22	
6	Light United	21	4	3	14	38	80	−42	15	
7	Mitchell Rangers	21	4	1	16	30	86	−56	13	
8	Reservoir Yeti	21	2	2	17	33	73	−40	8	
9	Oak Park SC	0	0	0	0	0	0	0	0	Team withdrew pre-season

(P) Promoted

==== West ====
Victorian State League 5 West
- Season: 2014

Pos	Team	Pld	W	D	L	GF	GA	GD	Pts	Qualification or relegation
1	Keilor Wolves (P)	18	10	4	4	42	28	+14	34	Promotion to the 2015 State League 4
2	Truganina Hornets (P)	18	10	4	4	37	25	+12	34	Promotion to the 2015 State League 4
3	Spring Hills FC	18	9	4	5	43	26	+17	31	
4	Lara SC	18	7	3	8	39	41	−2	24	
5	Kyneton District SC	18	7	2	9	51	42	+9	23	
6	Balmoral FC	18	5	6	7	27	33	−6	21	
7	Melbourne Lions	18	3	1	14	16	60	−44	10	
8	Melbourne Tornado SC	0	0	0	0	0	0	0	0	Team withdrew pre-season
9	Sunshine Heights SC	0	0	0	0	0	0	0	0	Team withdrew pre-season

(P) Promoted

==== South ====
Victorian State League 5 South
- Season: 2014

Pos	Team	Pld	W	D	L	GF	GA	GD	Pts	Qualification or relegation
1	Dandenong South SC (P)	20	16	3	1	79	24	+55	51	Promotion to the 2015 State League 4
2	Endeavour Hills SC (P)	20	15	3	2	76	26	+50	48	Promotion to the 2015 State League 4
3	Springvale City SC	20	15	1	4	73	20	+53	46	
4	East Bentleigh Strikers	20	13	2	5	61	31	+30	41	
5	Kings Domain FC	20	11	2	7	59	39	+20	35	
6	Albert Park SC	20	7	2	11	43	55	−12	23	
7	Chelsea FC	20	7	4	9	50	40	+10	22 (Note: Chelsea FC were deducted 3 points.)	
8	Baxter SC	20	7	3	10	35	48	−13	21 (Note: Baxter SC were deducted 3 points.)	
9	Parkmore SC	20	6	1	13	27	57	−30	19	
10	White Star Dandenong	20	0	3	17	8	75	−67	3	
11	Prahran City FC	20	0	2	18	16	112	−96	2	
12	Harrisfield Hurricanes FC	0	0	0	0	0	0	0	0	Team withdrew pre-season

(P) Promoted

==== East ====
Victorian State League 5 East
- Season: 2014

Pos	Team	Pld	W	D	L	GF	GA	GD	Pts	Qualification or relegation
1	Eltham Redbacks (P)	20	20	0	0	126	13	+113	60	Promotion to the 2015 State League 4
2	Old Xaverians SC (P)	20	14	3	3	62	24	+38	45	Promotion to the 2015 State League 4
3	Old Trinity Grammarians SC	20	12	3	5	66	39	+27	39	
4	St Kevins Old Boys SC	20	10	1	9	40	36	+4	31	
5	Swinburne FC	20	8	5	7	39	34	+5	29	
6	Glen Waverley SC	20	9	2	9	41	39	+2	29	
7	Yarra Jets	20	9	1	10	48	47	+1	28	
8	Old Ivanhoe Grammarians SC	20	8	1	11	34	46	−12	25	
9	Lilydale Eagles	20	4	2	14	19	66	−47	14	
10	Montrose SC	20	4	1	15	17	65	−48	13	
11	Healesville SC	20	2	1	17	20	103	−83	7	
12	Braeside United SC	0	0	0	0	0	0	0	0	Team withdrew pre-season

(P) Promoted

=== 2014 Women's Premier League ===
(Victoria (state)) Sportsmart Women's Premier League
- Season: 2014
- Champions: South Melbourne
- Premiers: South Melbourne

Pos	Team	Pld	W	D	L	GF	GA	GD	Pts	Qualification or relegation
1	South Melbourne (C)	22	18	2	2	70	22	+48	56	Finals series
2	Bulleen Lions	22	13	6	3	53	2	+51	45	Finals series
3	Boroondara Eagles	22	13	3	6	52	29	+23	42	Finals series
4	Bundoora United	22	12	5	5	62	28	+34	41	Finals series
5	Heidelberg United	22	12	2	8	54	32	+22	38	Finals series
6	Sandringham	22	10	6	6	50	32	+18	36	
7	Casey Comets	22	8	5	9	38	40	−2	29	
8	Box Hill United	22	9	1	12	36	51	−15	28	
9	Victorian Women's NTC U17	22	7	3	12	39	53	−14	24	
10	Ashburton United	22	5	2	15	21	59	−38	17	
11	Cairnlea FC (R)	22	5	1	16	17	69	−52	16	Relegated to 2015 Women's State League 1
12	Monbulk Rangers (R)	22	1	2	19	12	37	−25	5	Relegated to 2015 Women's State League 1

Source: foxsportspulse.com
Rules for classification: 1) points; 2) goal difference; 3) number of goals scored.
(C) Champions; (R) Relegated

==== Finals ====
Qualifying finals
2	Bulleen Lions	4
3	Boroondara Eagles	0
4	Bundoora United	4 (1)
5	Heidelberg United	4 (3)

Semi-finals
1	South Melbourne	1 (4)
Bulleen Lions	1 (2)
Boroondara Eagles	0
Heidelberg United	5

Preliminary finals
Bulleen Lions	1
Heidelberg United	4

Grand final
South Melbourne	1
Heidelberg United	0

== Cup Competitions ==
=== 2014 Dockerty Cup ===
Football Victoria soccer clubs competed in 2014 for the Dockerty Cup. The tournament doubled as the Victorian Qualifying rounds for the 2014 FFA Cup, with the top four clubs progressing to the Round of 32. A total of 191 clubs entered the qualifying phase, with the clubs entering in a staggered format.

The Cup was won by Melbourne Knights.

In addition to the two A-League clubs (Melbourne Victory and Melbourne City), the four semi-finalists (Bentleigh Greens, Melbourne Knights, St Albans Saints and South Springvale) competed in the final rounds of the 2014 FFA Cup.
