= 2025 Victoria Premier League 2 =

Victoria Premier League 2
- Season: 2025
- Dates: 7 February – 14 September 2025
- Champions: North Geelong Warriors
- Promoted: North Geelong Warriors; Eltham Redbacks; Brunswick Juventus
- Relegated: Boroondara-Carey Eagles; Geelong; Pascoe Vale
- Matches: 132
- Goals: 594 (4.5 per match)
- Top goalscorer: Sonny Brimmer (16)
- Biggest home win: Goulburn Valley Suns 5-0 Geelong (5 April 2025)
- Biggest away win: Boroondara-Carey Eagles 0-5 Essendon Royals (10 May 2025); Whittlesea United 0-5 Essendon Royals (15 August 2025)
- All statistics correct as of 28 September 2025.

The 2025 Victoria Premier League 2 is the inaugural season of the Victoria Premier League 2 (VPL 2), the fourth-tier of association football in Australia third-tier competition of association football in Victoria.

== Teams ==
Locations of 2025 VPL 2 clubs within metropolitan Melbourne.
Locations of 2024 Victoria Premier League clubs within Victoria.

14 teams competed in the 2025 Victoria Premier League 2 in 2025.

Club	Location	Grounds	Capacity
Altona City	Altona	HC Kim Reserve	1,000
Boroondara-Carey Eagles	Bulleen	Carey Bulleen Sports Complex	100
Box Hill United	Box Hill	Wembley Park	1,000
Brunswick Juventus	Fawkner	CB Smith Reserve	2,000
Eltham Redbacks	Eltham North	Eltham North Reserve	1,000
Essendon Royals	Essendon	Cross Keys Reserve	500
Geelong SC	Corio	Stead Park	5,000
Goulburn Valley Suns	Shepparton	John McEwan Reserve	3,200
North Geelong Warriors	Lara	Elcho Park	5,000
Nunawading City	Forest Hill	Mahoney's Reserve	1,000
Pascoe Vale	Coburg North	Hosken Reserve South	1,000
Springvale White Eagles	Keysborough	Serbian Sports Centre	5,000
Werribee City	Werribee	Galvin Park Reserve	1,000
Whittlesea United	Epping	Epping Stadium	10,000

== Regular season ==
Teams played a full home-and-away schedule. At the end of the season the top two clubs were promoted to the Victoria Premier Leagues 1 with the next four teams entering the Promotion play-offs. The bottom three teams were relegated into the Victorian State League 1.

=== League Table ===
Pos	Team	Pld	W	D	L	GF	GA	GD	Pts	Promotion, qualification or relegation
1	North Geelong Warriors (C, P)	26	18	4	4	68	44	+24	58	Promotion to the Victoria Premier League 1
2	Eltham Redbacks (P)	26	16	5	5	57	31	+26	53	Promotion to the Victoria Premier League 1
3	Brunswick Juventus (O, P)	26	12	8	6	43	39	+4	44	Qualified for the VPL1 Promotion play-offs
4	Altona City	26	13	1	12	41	48	−7	40	Qualified for the VPL1 Promotion play-offs
5	Springvale White Eagles	26	10	9	7	40	26	+14	39	Qualified for the VPL1 Promotion play-offs
6	Goulburn Valley Suns	26	11	6	9	52	42	+10	39	Qualified for the VPL1 Promotion play-offs
7	Essendon Royals	26	11	5	10	53	44	+9	38	
8	Box Hill United	26	10	3	13	32	43	−11	33	
9	Werribee City	26	8	7	11	28	37	−9	31	
10	Whittlesea United	26	9	2	15	40	57	−17	29	
11	Nunawading City	26	7	6	13	39	41	−2	27	
12	Boroondara-Carey Eagles (R)	26	6	9	11	39	47	−8	27	Relegation to Victorian State League 1
13	Geelong SC (R)	26	6	8	12	30	41	−11	26	Relegation to Victorian State League 1
14	Pascoe Vale (R)	26	6	5	15	32	54	−22	23	Relegation to Victorian State League 1

Rules for classification: 1) Points; 2) Goal difference; 3) Goals scored
(C) Champions; (O) Play-off winners; (P) Promoted; (R) Relegated

== Promotion Play-Offs ==
=== Bracket ===
Semi-finals
3	Brunswick Juventus	2
6	Goulburn Valley Suns	1
4	Altona City	0(4)
5	Springvale White Eagles	0(5)

Promotion Grand Final
3	Brunswick Juventus	1
5	Springvale White Eagles	0

=== Semi Finals ===
5 September	Altona City	0-0 (4–5 p)	Springvale White Eagles	Altona, Melbourne
20:00 AEST (UTC+10:00)		Report		Stadium: HC Kim Reserve

6 September	Brunswick Juventus	2-1	Goulburn Valley Suns	Fawkner, Melbourne
18:00 AEST (UTC+10:00)	Gilboy 59'; Smith 84'	Report	Schorah 41'	Stadium: CB Smith Reserve

=== Promotion Final ===
14 September	Brunswick Juventus	1–0	Springvale White Eagles	Albert Park, Melbourne
12:00 AEST (UTC+10:00)		Report		Stadium: Lakeside Stadium

== Statistics ==
As of 28 August 2025

=== Top Goal Scorers ===
Sonny Brimmer scored the most goals.

Rank	Player	Club	Goals	Games	GPG
1	Sonny Brimmer	North Geelong Warriors	16	26	0.62
2	Angus Chapman	North Geelong Warriors	15	26	0.58
3	Nicky Edwards	Eltham Redbacks	13	23	0.57
3	Jacob Colosimo	Boroondara-Carey Eagles	13	26	0.50
4	Tom Barforosh	Eltham Redbacks	12	24	0.50
4	Brandon Giaccherini	Goulburn Valley Suns	12	25	0.48
4	Ionut-Casian Anghel	North Geelong Warriors	12	25	0.48

=== Discipline ===
==== Red Cards ====
Altona City player Adam Oddo had a total of 3 red cards.

==== Yellow Cards ====
Nikola Jurkovic had the highest number of yellow cards.

Rank	Player	Club	YC	Games	YCPG
1	Nikola Jurkovic	Altona City	15	18	0.83
2	Benjamin Lyvidikos	Pascoe Vale	13	23	0.57
3	Adam Oddo	Altona City	12	20	0.60
4	Theodore Aresti	Brunswick Juventus	11	21	0.52
4	Christopher Dib	Pascoe Vale	11	23	0.48
4	Breckan Baker	Altona City	11	25	0.44
