= 2025 Victoria Premier League 1 =

2nd season of the Victoria Premier League 1

Victoria Premier League 1
- Season: 2025
- Dates: 7 February – 14 September 2025
- Champions: Bentleigh Greens
- Promoted: Bentleigh Greens; Caroline Springs George Cross; Melbourne City Youth
- Relegated: Eastern Lions; Kingston City; Moreland City
- Matches: 182
- Goals: 656 (3.6 per match)
- Top goalscorer: Luke Jonathan Lofts (16)
- Biggest home win: Melbourne City Youth 8–1 Moreland City (2 March 2025)
- Biggest away win: Western United Youth 0–4 Melbourne City Youth (30 March 2025)
- Highest scoring: Melbourne City Youth 8–1 Moreland City (2 March 2025)
- All statistics correct as of 27 August 2025.

The 2025 Victoria Premier League 1 is the second season of the Victoria Premier League 1, the third-tier competition in Australian football and the second-tier in Victorian football.The season was won by Bentleigh Greens, who along with Caroline Springs George Cross, were promoted to National Premier Leagues Victoria for the 2026 season.

One team placed fourth to seventh will also be promoted through a play-off.

Eastern Lions, Kingston City, and Moreland City were relegated to the Victoria Premier League 2.

Western United's overall license was revoked on 8 August 2025. and appealed by the club, Subsequently, the club's owners WMG Holdings were placed in liquidation on 29 August, after a Federal Court order, which was also appealed by the club. They were withdrawn from the promotion playoffs.

== Teams ==
Locations of 2025 VPL 1 clubs within metropolitan Melbourne.

14 teams competed in the 2025 Victoria Premier League 1 in 2025.

Team	Location	Stadium	Capacity
Bentleigh Greens	Cheltenham	Kingston Heath Soccer Complex	3,300
Brunswick City	Brunswick West	Dunstan Reserve	1,000
Bulleen Lions	Bulleen	David Barro Stadium	3,000
Caroline Springs George Cross	Fraser Rise	City Vista Recreation Reserve	3,000
Eastern Lions	Burwood	Gardiners Reserve	1,500
Kingston City	Clayton South	The Grange Reserve	2,000
Langwarrin	Langwarrin South	Lawton Park Reserve	5,000
Manningham United Blues	Templestowe	Pettys Reserve	1,000
Melbourne City Youth	Cranbourne East	City Football Academy	1,500
Melbourne Srbija	Burnley	Kevin Bartlett Reserve	2,500
Moreland City	Coburg	Campbell Reserve	1,000
Northcote City	Thornbury	John Cain Memorial Park	5,000
North Sunshine Eagles	St Albans	Larisa Reserve	500
Western United Youth	Tarneit	Wyndham Regional Football Facility	5,000

== Regular season ==
Teams played a full home-and-away schedule. At the end of the season the top two clubs were promoted to the National Premier Leagues Victoria. with the next four teams entering the Promotion play-offs. The bottom three teams were relegated to the Victoria Premier League 2.

=== League table ===
Pos	Team	Pld	W	D	L	GF	GA	GD	Pts	Promotion, qualification or relegation
1	Bentleigh Greens (C, P)	26	18	4	4	45	20	+25	58	Promotion to NPL Victoria
2	Caroline Springs George Cross (P)	26	19	0	7	77	35	+42	57	Promotion to NPL Victoria
3	Melbourne City Youth (P)	26	16	6	4	66	28	+38	54	Advance to promotional play-offs
4	Western United Youth	26	13	7	6	61	50	+11	46	Withdrawn from promotional play-offs (Note: Western United's overall license was revoked. The academy team will still participate in the 2026 season.)
5	Brunswick City	26	12	6	8	43	39	+4	42	Advance to promotional play-offs
6	North Sunshine Eagles	26	12	3	11	51	40	+11	39	Advance to promotional play-offs
7	Melbourne Srbija	26	10	7	9	45	38	+7	37	Advance to promotional play-offs
8	Bulleen Lions	26	10	3	13	35	41	−6	33	
9	Northcote City	26	9	5	12	45	44	+1	32	
10	Langwarrin SC	26	9	2	15	37	54	−17	29	
11	Manningham United Blues	26	6	7	13	35	65	−30	25	
12	Eastern Lions (R)	26	6	4	16	36	58	−22	22	Relegation to Victoria Premier League 2
13	Kingston City (R)	26	5	6	15	44	69	−25	21	Relegation to Victoria Premier League 2
14	Moreland City (R)	26	6	2	18	36	75	−39	20	Relegation to Victoria Premier League 2

Rules for classification: 1) Points; 2) Goal difference; 3) Goals scored
(C) Champions; (P) Promoted; (R) Relegated

== Promotional play-offs ==
Due to the removal of Western United Youth, teams placed third, fifth, sixth and seventh in the regular season compete in the play-offs. The winner will be promoted to the National Premier Leagues Victoria in 2026.

=== Bracket ===
Semi-finals
3	Melbourne City Youth	4
7	Melbourne Srbija	3
5	Brunswick City (a.e.t.)	3
6	North Sunshine Eagles	1

Final
3	Melbourne City Youth (p)	2 (3)
5	Brunswick City	2 (1)

=== Semi-finals ===
6 September 2025
15:00 AEST (UTC+10:00)

Melbourne City Youth	4–3	Melbourne Srbija
Marinucci 3'; Kalms 32', 45'; Humbert 90'	Report	Wilson 27', 54', 76'

Casey Fields, Cranbourne East

6 September 2025
17:00 AEST (UTC+10:00)

Brunswick City	3–1 (a.e.t.)	North Sunshine Eagles
Wong 53'; Addison 99'; Allshorn 102'	Report	Sordo 90'

Dunstan Reserve, Brunswick West

=== Final ===
14 September 2025
15:00 AEST (UTC+10:00)

Melbourne City Youth	2–2 (a.e.t.)	Brunswick City
Kalms 7', 83' (pen.)	Report	Timms 79'; Faapoi 90'
Penalties
Nasso (penalty scored); Ballah (penalty scored); Kalms (penalty scored)	3–1	Allshorn (penalty scored); Faapoi (penalty missed); Tsiamis (penalty missed); Hegazi (penalty missed)

Lakeside Stadium, Albert Park

== Statistics ==
As of 27 August 2025

=== Top goal scorers ===
Luke Jonathan Lofts scored the most goals.

Rank	Player	Club	Goals	Games	GPG
1	Luke Jonathan Lofts	Caroline Springs George Cross	16	25	0.62
2	Joshua Whiteley	Caroline Springs George Cross	14	23	0.61
2	Ndue Mujeci	North Sunshine Eagles	14	25	0.56
4	Nathan Stamatelos	Kingston City & Bulleen Lions	13	25	0.52
5	Kaan Elibol	North Sunshine Eagles	12	26	0.46

=== Discipline ===
==== Red cards ====
Melbourne City player Peter Antoniou and Kingston City player Jack Foden both had two red cards during the season.

==== Yellow cards ====
Jack Foden had the highest number of yellow cards.

Rank	Player	Club	YC	Games	YCPG
1	Jack Foden	Kingston City	11	19	0.58
2	Birhan Elibol	North Sunshine Eagles	9	15	0.60
2	Ned Mccarthy	Brunswick City	9	23	0.39
2	Rhys Dufton	Eastern Lions	9	25	0.36
2	Dante Conte	Bulleen Lions	9	26	0.35
2	Dennis Menelaou	Bulleen Lions	9	26	0.35
