= 2024 National Premier Leagues Victoria Men's =

National Premier Leagues Victoria
- Season: 2024
- Dates: 8 February – 7 September 2024
- Champions: Oakleigh Cannons
- Premiers: South Melbourne
- Relegated: Manningham United; Moreland City
- Matches: 187
- Goals: 627 (3.35 per match)
- Top goalscorer: Alex Salmon (18 goals)
- Biggest home win: Heidelberg United 6–0 St Albans Saints (5 April); Melbourne Knights 6–0 Moreland City (21 June); Dandenong City 7–1 Moreland City (28 June)
- Biggest away win: Dandenong Thunder 0–8 Avondale FC (20 April)
- Highest scoring: Altona Magic 6–3 Moreland City (27 July)

The 2024 National Premier Leagues Victoria was the 116th season of the National Premier Leagues Victoria (NPL), a regional Australian soccer competition based in Victoria, and the 11th season since the competition was renamed. The season began on 8 February and concluded on 7 September 2024.

South Melbourne were premiers after finishing six points clear at the top of the league. They would later lose 1–0 to Oakleigh Cannons in the NPL Victoria Grand Final, making Oakleigh the 2024 NPL Victoria champions.

== Teams ==
=== Stadiums and locations ===
Locations of the 2024 National Premier Leagues Victoria teams

Team	Location	Stadium	Capacity
Altona Magic	Melbourne (Altona North)	Paisley Park	5,000
Avondale FC	Melbourne (Parkville)	Avenger Park	1,000
Dandenong City	Melbourne (Dandenong)	Frank Holohan Soccer Complex	4,000
Dandenong Thunder	Melbourne (Dandenong)	George Andrews Reserve	5,000
Green Gully	Melbourne (Keilor Downs)	Green Gully Reserve	10,000
Heidelberg United	Melbourne (Heidelberg West)	Olympic Village	12,000
Hume City	Melbourne (Broadmeadows)	Hume City Stadium	3,000
Manningham United Blues	Melbourne (Templestowe)	Pettys Reserve	1,000
Melbourne Knights	Melbourne (Sunshine North)	Knights Stadium	4,000
Moreland City	Melbourne (Coburg)	CB Smith Reserve	2,000
Oakleigh Cannons	Melbourne (Oakleigh)	Jack Edwards Reserve	4,000
Port Melbourne	Melbourne (Port Melbourne)	JL Murphy Reserve	1,000
South Melbourne	Melbourne (Albert Park)	Lakeside Stadium	12,000
St Albans Saints	Melbourne (St Albans)	Churchill Reserve	3,500

== Regular season ==
=== League table ===
Pos	Team	Pld	W	D	L	GF	GA	GD	Pts	Qualification or relegation
1	South Melbourne	26	19	3	4	53	20	+33	60	2024 NPL Victoria Finals
2	Avondale FC	26	16	6	4	65	29	+36	54	2024 NPL Victoria Finals
3	Oakleigh Cannons (C)	26	16	5	5	53	28	+25	53	2024 NPL Victoria Finals
4	Heidelberg United	26	14	9	3	46	21	+25	51	2024 NPL Victoria Finals
5	Hume City	26	15	5	6	50	29	+21	50	2024 NPL Victoria Finals
6	Dandenong City	26	11	4	11	50	51	−1	37	2024 NPL Victoria Finals
7	Melbourne Knights	26	10	5	11	43	37	+6	35	
8	Altona Magic	26	10	3	13	43	50	−7	33	
9	Port Melbourne	26	9	6	11	41	52	−11	33	
10	Dandenong Thunder	26	8	4	14	29	51	−22	28	
11	St Albans Saints	26	8	1	17	30	54	−24	25	
12	Green Gully	26	6	6	14	34	53	−19	24	
13	Manningham United Blues (R)	26	5	3	18	42	72	−30	18	Relegation to the National Premier Leagues Victoria 2
14	Moreland City (R)	26	4	2	20	36	68	−32	14	Relegation to the National Premier Leagues Victoria 2

Rules for classification: 1) points; 2) goal difference; 3) number of goals scored.
(C) Champions; (R) Relegated

=== Results ===
Home \ Away	ALT	AVO	DCI	DTH	GRE	HEI	HUM	MAN	MEL	MOR	OAK	POR	SOU	SAS
Altona Magic	—	1–0	0–2	2–3	0–0	0–1	0–2	6–2	1–0	6–3	0–2	1–0	1–4	1–0
Avondale FC	4–0	—	4–3	2–1	0–1	0–0	5–0	5–1	1–1	0–3	3–3	5–1	1–1	2–1
Dandenong City	3–2	0–1	—	1–2	1–1	1–3	2–4	2–4	2–5	7–1	1–1	5–3	0–4	2–0
Dandenong Thunder	0–4	0–8	1–0	—	1–1	0–2	1–2	2–1	0–3	3–5	3–1	3–1	1–2	3–0
Green Gully	2–4	1–6	2–3	1–1	—	2–0	1–2	4–1	0–3	1–0	4–2	1–2	0–1	4–0
Heidelberg United	1–1	1–1	3–0	2–0	3–0	—	1–1	5–0	2–0	3–2	1–1	0–0	1–0	6–0
Hume City	2–0	1–2	0–0	0–0	2–0	2–2	—	5–1	1–1	3–2	0–2	4–0	0–1	2–1
Manningham United Blues	4–5	3–0	2–3	2–1	1–1	1–2	1–3	—	1–2	3–3	1–4	2–2	2–5	4–0
Melbourne Knights	2–1	3–3	2–2	1–2	3–3	0–1	2–5	1–0	—	6–0	0–1	1–3	0–1	3–0
Moreland City	2–3	0–1	1–2	4–0	2–1	2–3	0–2	1–4	0–1	—	0–2	1–1	0–1	0–1
Oakleigh Cannons	3–1	1–2	0–2	1–1	4–1	3–0	3–1	3–0	3–1	3–1	—	3–0	0–0	3–2
Port Melbourne	1–1	0–4	3–1	3–0	3–2	2–2	0–3	3–0	2–0	3–1	1–2	—	2–3	0–0
South Melbourne	4–0	1–3	1–2	1–0	3–0	1–1	1–0	2–0	1–0	4–2	1–2	4–0	—	2–1
St Albans Saints	3–2	1–2	1–3	1–0	5–0	1–0	0–3	2–1	1–2	4–0	1–0	3–5	1–4	—

Legend: Blue = home team win; Yellow = draw; Red = away team win.

== Finals series ==
=== Bracket ===
Elimination finals
4	Heidelberg United	1 (4)
5	Hume City (p)	1 (5)
3	Oakleigh Cannons	4
6	Dandenong City	1

Preliminary finals
1	South Melbourne (a.e.t.)	1
5	Hume City	0
2	Avondale FC	0
3	Oakleigh Cannons	3

Grand final
1	South Melbourne	0
3	Oakleigh Cannons	1

=== Elimination-finals ===
23 August 2024
19:30 AEST

Heidelberg United	1–1 (a.e.t.)	Hume City
Ngor 41'	Report	Isgrove 86' (pen.)
Penalties
Collins (penalty scored); Sheppard (penalty scored); Fetahagic (penalty scored); Theodoropoulos (penalty missed); Ellis (penalty scored); Aidara (penalty missed)	4–5	(penalty scored) Isgrove; (penalty missed) Mcfarlane; (penalty scored) Gulevski; (penalty scored) Ascroft; (penalty scored) L. Weier; (penalty scored) Ochieng

Olympic Village, Melbourne
Referee: Ross Clark

24 August 2024
14:15 AEST

Oakleigh Cannons	4–1	Dandenong City
Wellsmore 22'; Salmon 43'; Guest 86'; Kasumovic 89'	Report	Iaconis 53'

Jack Edwards Reserve, Melbourne
Referee: Ioannis Zisis

=== Preliminary finals ===
30 August 2024
19:30 AEST

South Melbourne	1–0 (a.e.t.)	Hume City
Mikkola 96'	Report

Lakeside Stadium, Melbourne
Referee: Astro Sakalis

31 August 2024
14:15 AEST

Avondale FC	0–3	Oakleigh Cannons
	Report	Guest 41'; Sinclair 47'; Salmon 75'

Avenger Park, Melbourne
Referee: Lachlan Keevers

=== Grand final ===
7 September 2024
18:00 AEST

South Melbourne	0–1	Oakleigh Cannons
	Report	Wellsmore 72'

The Home of the Matildas, Melbourne
Referee: Michael Mammis

== Season statistics ==
=== Top scorers ===
Rank	Player	Club	Goals
1	Alex Salmon	Oakleigh Cannons	18
2	Harry Sawyer	South Melbourne	16
3	Lloyd Isgrove	Hume City	15
4	Aamir Abdallah	Hume City	14
4	Ben Everson	Manningham United Blues	14
4	Bul Juach	Altona Magic	14
7	Ciaran Bramwell	Melbourne Knights	13
7	Joe Guest	Oakleigh Cannons	13
7	Stefan Zinni	Avondale FC	13
10	Christos Theodorakopoulos	Manningham United Blues; Moreland City	12
10	Nahuel Bonada	South Melbourne	12

=== Discipline ===
==== Player ====
- Most yellow cards: 10
  - James Tountas (Manningham United Blues)
  - Jack Webster (Dandenong City)
- Most red cards: 2
  - Jacob Eliopoulos (Oakleigh Cannons)
  - Luke Jurcic (Moreland City)
  - Adolph Koudakpo (Green Gully)
  - Michael Tzoutzidis (Moreland City)
  - Jack Webster (Dandeong City)
