= 2023 Dockerty Cup =

99th season of the Dockerty Cup

Tournament details
- Country: Australia
- Teams: 218

Final positions
- Champions: Oakleigh Cannons (1st title)
- Runners-up: Heidelberg United

The 2023 Dockerty Cup was the 99th season of the Dockerty Cup, the annual soccer knockout cup competition held between men's clubs in Victoria. The competition also served as qualifying rounds for the 2023 Australia Cup.

A total of 218 clubs − a record since the return of the competition in 2011 − entered the qualifying phase, with clubs entering in a staggered format.

Oakleigh Cannons won its first Dockerty Cup, defeating Heidelberg United in the final on 4 August 2023.

== Final ==
4 August 2023
19:30 AEST

Oakleigh Cannons	3–0	Heidelberg United
Guest 28' (pen.), 59' (pen.); Salmon 84'		Fetahagić (red card)

Kingston Heath Soccer Complex

== See also ==
- 2023 Football Victoria season
