= 2025 Dockerty Cup =

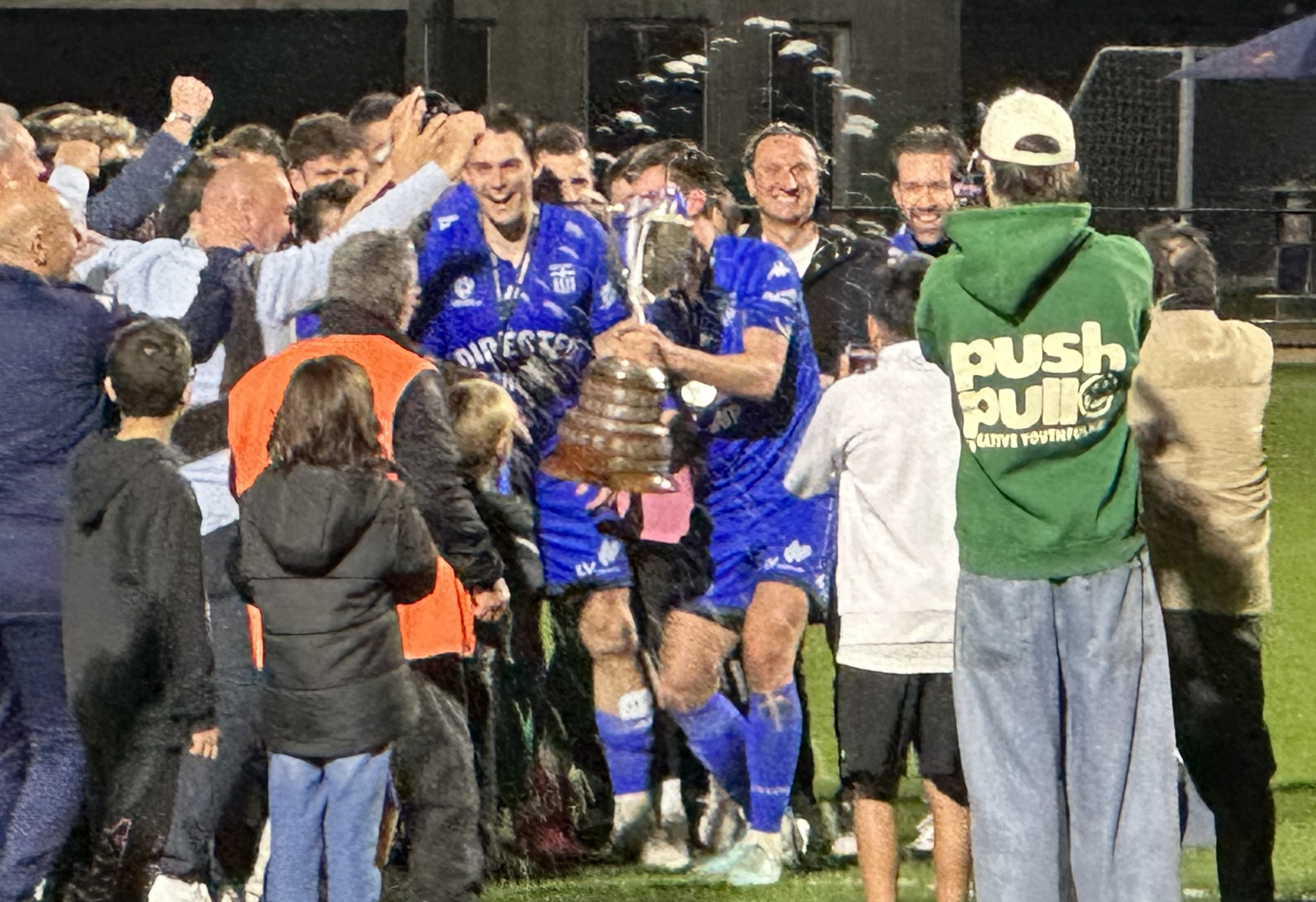

Tournament details
- Country: Australia
- Dates: 14 February – 9 August 2025
- Teams: 218

Final positions
- Champions: South Melbourne (10th title)
- Runners-up: Heidelberg United
- Semifinalists: Nunawading City; Avondale FC

The 2025 Dockerty Cup was the 100th edition of the Dockerty Cup, an annual soccer knockout-cup competition held between men's clubs in Victoria. A total of 218 clubs from the Victorian soccer league system competed.

South Melbourne won the Dockerty Cup for the tenth time, defeating Heidelberg United 2–1 in the final held on 9 August 2025.

The competition also served as qualifying rounds for the Australia Cup. In addition to the three Victorian A-League clubs, the four preliminary Round 7 winners qualified for the final rounds of the 2025 Australia Cup, entering at the Round of 32.

== Format ==
Round	Clubs remaining	Winners from previous round	New entries this round	Main Match Dates
Round 1	218	none	131	14–16 Feb
Round 2	167	80	48	28 Feb–3 Mar
Round 3	103	64	14	11–25 Mar
Round 4	64	39	25	8–19 Apr
Round 5	32	32	none	29 Apr–14 May
Round 6	16	16	none	20–27 May
Round 7	8	8	none	10–17 Jun
Semi-finals	4	4	none	12 Jul
Final	2	2	none	TBD

== Preliminary rounds ==
Victorian clubs participated in the 2025 Australia Cup via the preliminary rounds. This was open to teams from the NPL Victoria, VPL 1, VPL 2, State League divisions, regional and metros leagues. Based on their divisions, teams entered in different rounds.

The four qualifiers for the final rounds were:

Australia Cup Qualifiers
Avondale FC (2)	Heidelberg United (2)	Nunawading City (4)	South Melbourne (2)

== Semi-finals ==
A total of four teams took part in this stage of the competition, with the matches played on 12 July.

Tie no	Home team (tier)	Score	Away team (tier)	Ref.
1	Heidelberg United (2)	5–0	Nunawading City (4)	
2	South Melbourne (2)	3–1	Avondale FC (2)	

== Final ==
The 2025 Dockerty Cup Final was played between Heidelberg United and South Melbourne at the Home of the Matildas on 9 August 2025. This would be the 123rd time the two sides met. Despite being nine-time and defending winners, South entered the clash as underdogs, with Heidelberg sitting equal top of the NPLM table. Japanese playmaker Asahi Yokokawa scored a goal for Heidelberg in the fifth minute of the game. Chasing an equaliser, South looked dangerous but Heidelberg's strong defence prevailed until half time. In the 47th minute, Campbell Dovison levelled the scores. Into injury time, Campbell Dovison scored his second goal in the 90+5th minute, ensuring victory, and resulting in him being awarded the Jimmy McKay Medal for the best player.

9 August 2025	Heidelberg United	1–2	South Melbourne	Melbourne
16:00 AEST (UTC+10:00)	Yokokawa 5'	Report	Dovison 47', 90+5'	Stadium: Home of the Matildas
