= Eastern Lions SC =

Eastern Lions
- Full name: Eastern Lions Soccer Club
- Nickname: Lions
- Founded: 1963
- Ground: Gardiners Reserve, Burwood, Victoria
- Chairman: Ange Stamatelos
- Manager: Chris Greechan
- League: Victoria Premier League 2
- 2026: 9th of 14
- Website: https://easternlions.com.au/
Home colours	Away colours

Eastern Lions Soccer Club is an Australian football club based in Burwood, Victoria, currently playing in the Victoria Premier League 2. Its home ground is the Gardiners Reserve.

== Club history ==
Eastern Lions Soccer Club was founded in 1963 by a group of British expats under the name Waverley City Soccer Club. Waverley City began life in the Industrial League playing at the ground located at the corner of Power Street and High Street Road, Ashwood, prior to moving to the Sixth Avenue Ground.

1964: The club is elected to the 4th Division of the Metropolitan League and wins the League in the first season.

1965 & 1966: Competed in 3rd division

1967: Promoted to division 2. Remain in division 2 until 1973. S. Jordan scored 37 goals from 25 games.

1968: Finished 9th.

1969: Finished 7th

1971: Colin Waller becomes the first player to score 100 goals for the club. Finished 3rd.

1974: Promoted to division 1. The reserves only loss was to Springvale 0-1. Defeated Croydon both home and away yet lost the league on goal average. The reserves went into the last game of the season needing to win by 14 goals to win the league. They won 12-0 and finished second

1976: Gary Appleton becomes the first player to play 250 games for the club.

1977: The club wins the Federation Cup defeating Melbourne 2-1 in the final. The road to the final win comprised victories Croydon City 2-0, Doveton 3-1, defending champions Albion Rovers 2-1 and defeated Park Rangers 3-2 in the semi-final. Robert Stocca becomes the youngest player to play in the first team, at age 14.

1978: Relegation to Division 2

1979: Sevens sets of brothers play in the senior and U/18S Michael & Radenki Gigovis Gareth & Cemlin Martin Sean & Michael Keogh Paul & David Storey Robert & Danny Stocca John & Sam Armen Hamish & Watson Young

1983: Ted Quy ends the season by equaling the club appearance record of 286 games. Peter Whitehurst plays his 250th and last game, with a record 124 first team goals.

1984: Ted Quy becomes the first player to play 300 first team games. He finished the season with the club record (at that time) of 311 first team games, and would ultimately play 317 in total.

1985: Norm Willcox began his journey with the Eastern Lions.

1986: Marcus Creek, playing for the Waverley Wanderers, wins the Amateur League Division 2 Best & Fairest award.

1987: Club wins the Armstrong cup. After a penalty shootout victory over Doncaster in the semi-final, Waverley defeats Box Hill in another shootout, 6-5, after the game had finished 3-3 at the end of extra time. Paul Storey ran the longest lap of honour in the club's history.

1988: Paul Storey makes his 400th senior appearance. Marcus Creek, playing for the Waverley Wanderers, wins the Amateur League Division 1 Best & Fairest award. Finished sixth.

1989: Waverley Wanderers wins the Amateur cup.

1990: Alex Wilson makes his 400th senior appearance. Waverley Wanderers wins the Amateur cup again. Ian Blakehurst wins the Amateur League Division 1 Best & Fairest award. Finished 9th.

1991: Graeme O'Neill breaks the Reserve games record, ending the season on 179 games. He will finish playing in 1993 with a record 213 Reserves appearances and a record 113 goals.

1992: Paul Storey finishes his playing career with a (still) club record 450 Senior games (341 first team, 109 reserves). Alan Wilson also retires with a total of 427 games (336 first team 91 reserves). Jimmy Williams wins the State League Division 2 Best & Fairest award.

1994: Terry Grimwade plays his 300th first team game. He will finish playing in 1995 with 323 first team games and 60 goals.

1997: Waverley City and Scotch College amalgamate to form Old Scotch Waverley Soccer club.

1999: Alex Rusmir makes his 200th senior appearance.

2003: Club changes its name to Eastern Lions Soccer Club.

2004: Relegation was avoided by defeating Stonnington in the last game of the season. Stonnigton needed 1 point for promotion.

2006: Relegated to Division 3.

2007: Won promotion back to Division 2 after finishing 2nd. Present coach Jimmy Williams along with new players Saleem Nasser, Ray Markley and the return of goalkeeper Nick Abougellis and Dan Willcocks formed a strong combination. Of the 22 players used in the first team 15 were goal scorers.

2008: 56 players were used in the first and reserve teams. Nick Abougellis became the 3rd goalkeeper in the club's history to play 100 games for the club. Five players were leading goal scorers in the first team with only three goals.

2009: In his first season with the club Oran Harel was the leading goal scorer in Division 2/South East with 21 goals. Seven players who would later be part of the winning Division 2 team in 2012 were in this team.

2010: Oran Harel was again the leading goal scorer in Division 2. Munyar Nyadzayo won the Division 2 Best & Fairest award in his first season with the club. He was the second player to do so after present coach Jimmy Williams did in 1992.

2011: The first team only lost four games, but eight draws pushed them down to finish in 4th place. The reserve team led by Andy Lee won the league, and their best result was a 13-0 win over Hatherton. The club honoured treasured supporter Clive Wright (1942-2011) with a memorial lunch at season's end.

2012: With an outstanding second half of the season the club secured promotion to Division 1 after finishing on top of the table. In the second last game versus Morwell, two players, Keiron Kennedy and sub Graham Evans, scored their first goal for the first team in the 2-2 championship clinching draw. Only a 7-goal loss in the last game would deny the Lions however, a 2-1 win against Malvern wrapped it up.

2013: Promoted to Division 1. Most of last year's squad remained with the club. A notable departure was goalkeeper Andy Lightfoot, who studied overseas. Since making his debut at the end of 2009 he had made 76 consecutive appearances in the first team.-->

After winning the Victorian State League Division 1 South-East in 2014, Eastern Lions were offered a place in the NPL2 East conference for 2015, which the club subsequently accepted. The Lions finished in 7th position on the NPL2 East ladder and 13th place in the NPL2 overall in 2015.

On 5 August 2016, it was announced that their superstar Munyar Nyadzayo had decided to depart the club. Nyadzayo played 145 games for Eastern Lions, joining in 2010 and playing a part in the next seven seasons with the club. Nyadzayo left the club to pursue a career opportunity in Dubai.

2019: Eastern Lions win the NPL Victoria 2 East and are promoted to the top flight of Victorian Football for the first time in its history.

2020: Eastern Lions participate in the Victorian top flight NPL for the first time in its history with Jimmy Williams at the helm again and George Campbell taking charge of the U20’s/Reserves.

== Recent Seasons ==
Results of league and cup competitions by season
Season	League										Dockerty Cup	Australia Cup	Top goalscorer(s) (Note: Goals in League Matches)	
Season	Division	Tier	Pld	W	D	L	GF	GA	Pts	Pos	Dockerty Cup	Australia Cup	Player(s)	Goals
2012	Victorian State League 2 South-East ↑	4	22	13	7	2	51	28	46	1st	Zone Semi-Finals (48)	-	Oran Harel	12
2013	Victorian State League 1 ↓	3	22	5	5	12	24	35	20	11th	-	-	Oran Harel & Ray Markley	5
2014	Victorian State League 1 South-East ↑	4	22	18	0	4	42	17	54	1st	Round 6 (16)	Did not qualify	Philip Ajao	19
2015	NPL1 Victoria East	3	28	11	8	9	50	50	41	7th	Round 4 (64)	Did not qualify	Munyaradzi Nyadzayo	16
2016	NPL2 Victoria East	3	28	12	3	13	43	49	39	7th	Round 4 (64)	Did not qualify	Cameron Neales	10
2017	NPL2 Victoria East	3	28	9	6	13	42	54	33	6th	Round 4 (64)	Did not qualify	Philip Ajao	11
2018	NPL2 Victoria East	3	28	13	3	12	68	24	53	3rd	Round 4 (64)	Did not qualify	Cameron Neales & Casey Thomas	7
2019	NPL2 Victoria East ↑	3	28	17	6	5	54	32	57	1st	Round 5 (32)	Did not qualify	Thomas Biss	14
2020	NPL Victoria	2	Season not contested due to COVID-19 pandemic in Victoria											
2021	NPL Victoria	2	26	4	5	17	24	57	17	13th	Round 6 (16)	Did not qualify	-	-
2022	NPL Victoria ↓	2	26	1	5	20	17	70	8	14th	Round 4 (75)	Did not qualify	Marcus Dimanche	4
2023	NPL2 Victoria	3	26	12	3	11	37	40	39	5th	Round 6 (20)	Did not qualify	Carter Ramsay	13
2024	Victorian Premier League	3	26	8	6	12	32	47	30	10th	Round 5 (40)	Did not qualify	Omani Leacock	8
2025	Victorian Premier League	3	-	-	-	-	-	-	-	-	Round 4 (32)	Did not qualify	-	-

== Tidbits ==
Kyle Patterson scored 12 goals in 1984, of which 11 were penalties.

Phil Trianedes in his first year in goal for the first team played a blinder against Preston 2nd Division side, which included five players from the national league side; the score was a draw, 2-2. The following year he was signed by Preston and went on to play more than 200 games in the National State Premier League.

Norm Willcox has been president for 24 of the last 26 years.

In 1967 the reserve team scored 113 goals for the season. An average of 4.7 goals per game.

John Milway, Godfrey Troath and Eric Richardson have all been members of the club in excess of 40 years.

Life Members: Alex Sterland, Bruce Eastaway (dec), Bill Blackley, Joe Mchugh (dec), Anne Whitlam (dec), Reg Wall (dec), Alan Roberts, Vic Binding, Eric Richardson, John Milway, Godfrey Troath, Norm Willcocks, Atha Pavlou, Graeme O'Neill, Noel Parkin, Nigel Reed.
