= Kingston City FC =

- Founded: 1974
- Ground: The Grange Reserve
- Capacity: 2000
- Chairman: Sam Koulis
- Coach: Peter Natsis
- League: Victoria Premier League 1
- 2025: 13th of 14 (relegated)
- Website: http://www.kingston-cityfc.com.au
Home colours	Away colours

Kingston City Football Club is an Australian professional soccer club from Clayton South, Victoria (within the local government area of Kingston), whose home ground is The Grange Reserve. Kingston City currently competes in the Victoria Premier League 2.

== History ==
The club was established in 1974 in the south-eastern Melbourne suburb of Clarinda by members of the local Greek Australian community. Originally called Liverpool Soccer Club, the club was renamed Clarinda Soccer Club the following year (1975). Playing many of its home games on the grounds of Clayton Technical School in Clayton, Victoria, the club spent most of its early years competing in the lower divisions of the Victorian District Leagues. In 1982 the club moved to its current home ground The Grange in the neighbouring suburb of Clayton South, Victoria, and in 1998 was renamed Kingston City Soccer Club. The name change was made to reflect the amalgamation of local city councils and the restructuring of city borders, but also to broaden the club's appeal amongst the non-Greek population in the local area.

Kingston City competed in the 2006 Victorian Premier League after back-to-back promotions in 2004 and 2005, winning the State League Division One title in the latter year. The club's stay in the top-flight was short-lived though, suffering relegation in 2007. Financial struggles then blighted the club, with six-figure debt hindering Kingston's operations. A second relegation followed in 2008 when City finished bottom of State League 1 and then a third consecutive relegation when it finished bottom of the 2009 State League Division Two South-East.

After finishing his playing career at the end of the 2012 State League Division 2 South-East season, Nick Tolios took over as head coach of the club.

In 2014, Kingston City was announced as one of the successful applicants for the newly introduced National Premier Leagues Victoria, joining the second division, the new second tier of football in Victoria. Kingston finished in 8th place in its first season in the 14-team league.

The following season, six additional clubs were added to National Premier Leagues Victoria 2, with the division splitting into East and West conferences of ten sides each. Kingston finished in 6th place in NPL2 East in 2015.

On 3 September 2016, Kingston City achieved promotion from to NPL Victoria in dramatic circumstances. Needing to avoid defeat on the final match-day of the regular season, Damian Iaconis scored a 94th-minute equaliser to achieve automatic promotion into the top flight. In the 2016 NPL2 Grand Final, Kingston City came back from 2–0 down to win 3–2 against St Albans Saints, with Slaven Vranesevic scoring two near-identical free kicks, and Kingston were crowned NPL Victoria 2 Champions. Velibor Mitrovic was top goalscorer with 19 goals.

Kingston finished in 10th place in its first season in the NPL in 2017, seven points clear of the relegation playoff spot. Iaconis top-scored with 12 goals. The following season, City finished just outside of the finals series, two points behind Port Melbourne in sixth place. Iaconis once again top-scored with 11 goals. In 2019, after three seasons in the top flight in Victoria, Kingston City were relegated, finishing in second-bottom place, one point short of Dandenong Thunder in the relegation play-off spot. After relegation was confirmed, Tolios left the club to take up an opportunity at Bentleigh Greens after seven years as head coach of Kingston.

Kingston then appointed Con Tangalakis as manager for the 2020 season.

== Honours ==
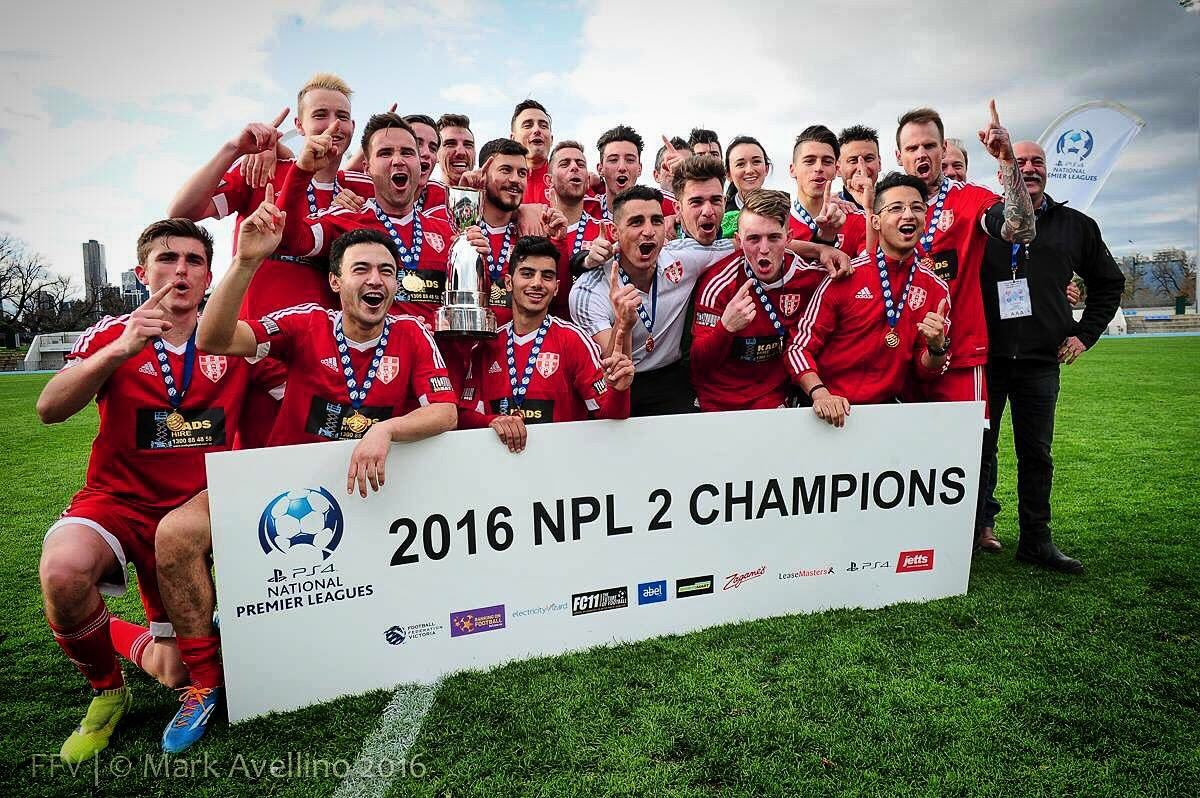
Kingston City celebrating their 2016 NPL2 championship

- NPL2/Victoria Premier League 1 Champions: 2016
- NPL2/Victoria Premier League 1 Premiers: 2016
- Victorian State League Division 1 Champions: 2005
- Victorian State League Division 2 Champions: 1994, 2002
- Victorian State League Division 3 Champions: 2011 Seniors & Reserves
- Victorian State League Division 4 Champions: 1986
- Victorian State League Provisional League 1 Champions: 1985
- Hellenic Cup Winners: 1983, 1993–94

== 2019 Senior Men's National Premier Leagues Victoria Squad ==
as of February 2019 Note: Flags indicate national team as defined under FIFA eligibility rules; some limited exceptions apply. Players may hold more than one non-FIFA nationality.

No.	Pos.	Nation	Player
1	GK	AUS	Stephen Hatzikourtis
2	DF	AUS	Michael Mullins
4	DF	AUS	Simo Jovanovic
5	DF	AFG	Faisal Sakhizada
6	DF	AUS	Nathan Tidmarsh
7	MF	AUS	Chris Irwin
9	FW	CHI	Hernan Inestroza
10	FW	AUS	Mouad Zwed
11	MF	AUS	Ali Sulemani
12	FW	AUS	Erhan Yalaz

No.	Pos.	Nation	Player
13	DF	AUS	Daniel Bennett
14	FW	AUS	Damian Iaconis
16	MF	AUS	Anthony Theo
17	MF	AUS	Alex Caniglia
18	MF	AUS	Anthony Ianchello
19	FW	AUS	David Antequera
20	GK	JPN	Satoshi Osougi
22	DF	AUS	Ajdin Fetahagic
23	FW	AUS	Cooper Legrand

== Competition timeline ==
Season	Division	Pos	Played	W	D	L	F	A	Points
2019 R	NPL	13th	26	6	5	15	35	51	23
2018	NPL	7th	26	10	4	12	39	45	34
2017	NPL	10th	26	8	7	11	37	42	31
2016 C	NPL 2 East	1st	28	21	3	4	65	32	66
2015	NPL 1 East	6th	28	15	2	11	59	50	47
2014	NPL 1	8th	26	11	2	13	54	46	35
2013	SL 2 South/East	7th	22	10	1	11	42	42	31
2012	SL 2 South/East	7th	22	10	0	12	40	45	30
2011 C	SL 3 South/East	1st	22	16	4	2	61	15	52
2010	SL 3 South/East	4th	22	14	2	6	44	32	44
2009 R	SL 2 South/East	12th	22	4	5	13	32	57	14
2008 R	SL 1	12th	22	4	1	17	20	50	13
2007 R	VPL	15th	26	7	6	13	32	38	27
2006 F	VPL	5th	26	11	5	10	37	39	38
2005 C	SL 1	1st	22	16	5	1	44	14	53
2004 P	SL 2 South/East	2nd	22	11	8	3	35	17	41
2003 R	SL 1	12th	22	3	7	12	22	52	16
2002 C	SL 2 South/East	1st	22	16	5	1	47	17	53
2001	SL 2 South/East	4th	22	11	1	10	43	40	34
2000	SL 2 South/East	8th	22	8	2	12	31	30	26
1999 R	SL 1	13th	26	6	6	14	31	58	24

R relegated P promoted C champions F finals
