= North Sunshine Eagles FC =

North Sunshine Eagles
- Full name: North Sunshine Eagles Football Club
- Founded: 1970 as West Footscray SC
- Ground: Larissa Reserve, St Albans
- President: Memet Selimi
- Manager: Arben Isai
- League: Victoria Premier League 1
- 2025: 6th of 14
- Website: https://www.nsefc.com.au/
Home colours	Away colours

North Sunshine Eagles FC is a soccer club from St Albans, Victoria, a suburb of Melbourne, Victoria, Australia. It is an Albanian Australian-backed club. The club currently competes in Victoria Premier League 1.

== History ==
=== Early years ===
The club was founded in 1975 as Klubi Futbollistik Shqiponja – Albanian Eagle Soccer Club by Albanian migrants. In 1989 the club moved its home base from McIvor Reserve in Yarraville to Keilor Downs. Just two years later in 1991, the club moved its home base once more to its current location at Larissa Reserve in the Western Melbourne suburb of St Albans.

In 1993, the club changed its name from Albanian Eagle SC to North Sunshine Eagles Soccer Club. At the end of 2000 season, NSEFC was promoted from Victorian Provisional League 1 to Victorian State League Division 3 in 2001. Another promotion followed just two seasons later, but the club found itself back in Provisional League 1 after relegations in both 2005 and 2006.

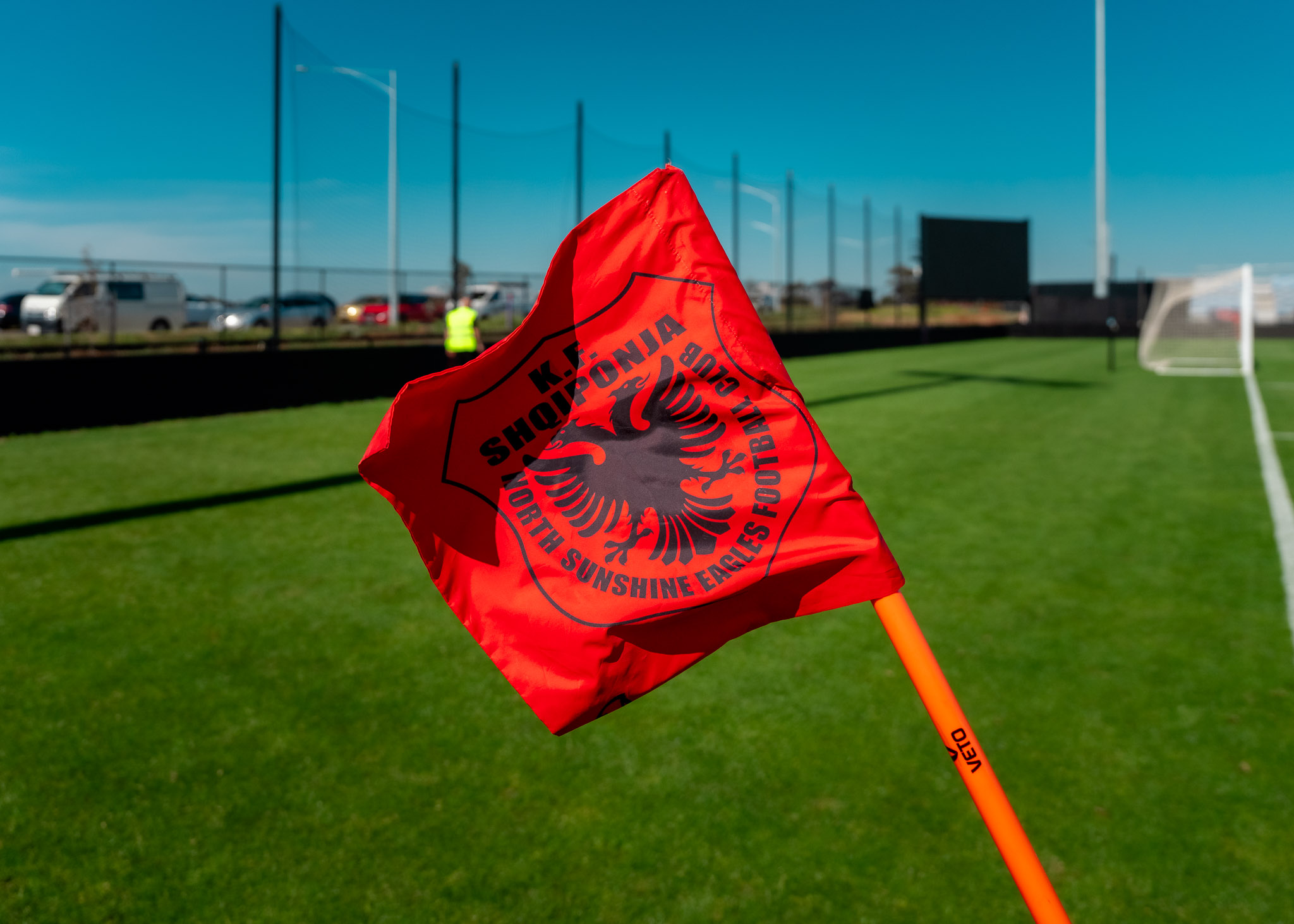
Corner flag bearing the symbol of North Sunshine Eagles FC (NSEFC) at a football pitch in Australia

=== Rise to State One ===
North Sunshine experienced a stellar rise between 2011 and 2014. The club won the Provisional League 1 championship in 2011, earning automatic promotion to State League Division 3. In 2013, the side managed a 3rd-place finish in State 3 and were promoted to the Victorian State League Division 2 North-West for the 2014 season due to a league re-structure following the introduction of the National Premier Leagues Victoria. The Eagles achieved promotion in their first season in State League 2, winning the league championship.

In its first season in the third tier of football in Victoria in 2015, the Victorian State League Division 1 North-West, the club finished in 5th place. In the 2015 season, there was a historic match played out between North Sunshine Eagles and local rivals Sunshine George Cross FC in the FFA Cup. The nine man Eagles came from two-goals down in extra-time to draw 6–6 and then win 4–2 on penalties. FFA Cups 12 goal Sunshine derby spectacular The club was then drawn against state league powerhouse South Melbourne FC in the next round and lost 8–0.

In preparation for the 2017 season, North Sunshine announced the homecoming of former junior and Hume City FC captain Shane Rexhepi. On signing for the club, Rexhepi stated: "I will play NPL again and it will be with NSEFC". The Eagles also added Reardo Luka from North Geelong Warriors FC and Lewis Shannon from a brief stint with Green Gully SC. The club finished in 3rd place in the 2017 season, 11 points behind league champions Altona Magic, who were promoted, and three behind Geelong SC. Diellon Memishi finished the season with 19 goals, taking out the league golden boot.

For the 2018 season, the Eagles brought in Zaim Zeneli from South Melbourne, Darren Lewis and Vito Cichello from North Geelong Warriors and Robert Zadworny from Melbourne Knights. North Sunshine finished the season in 2nd place, two points behind Geelong, once more missing out on promotion to the NPL. The Eagles achieved promotion from State League 1 in 2019, with Nick Epifano scoring 15 goals in 14 games.

Today the club is primarily backed and supported by Albanians and Albanian-Australians living in Melbourne.

On 20 April 2021,an incident occurred in the football match between the North Sunshine Eagles and Springvale White Eagles (Serbian-Australian team), in which Albanian fans attacked Serbian ones. On several occasions, Springvale White Eagles fans provoked the North Sunshine Eagle fans by chanting "Kosovo is Serbia", as well as various other slogans and insults. The results of the incident were a seriously injured young man among the fans of the Serbian club, several slightly injured and significant material damage to the cars in the car park.

== Honours ==
=== Team ===
- 2024- VPL2 promotion (2nd)
- 2019– State League 1 North-West Promotion (2nd)
- 2018– State League 1 North-West (2nd)
- 2017– State League 1 North-West (3rd)
- 2016– State League 1 North-West (3rd)
- 2015– State League 1 North-West (5th)
- 2014– State League 2 North-West

Champions

- 2013– State League 3 Promotion (3rd)
- 2011 - Provisional 1 North-West Champions

=== Individual ===
- State League 1 North-West Golden Boot

2017- Diellon Memishi
2016- Diellon Memish
