= FC Melbourne Srbija =

- Full name: FC Melbourne Srbija
- Nicknames: Serbia, Srbija
- Founded: 1963; 63 years ago as Srbija Soccer Club
- Ground: Kevin Bartlett Reserve; F.R Smith Drive; Burnley, Victoria
- Capacity: 2,500
- Chairman: Savo Kovačević
- Coach: Željko Popović
- League: Victoria Premier League 1
- 2026: 7th of 14
- Website: fcmelbourne.com.au
Home colours	Away colours

FC Melbourne Srbija (Serbian Cyrillic: ФК Мелбурн Србија), commonly known as Melbourne Serbia (formerly known as Fitzroy City Srbija Soccer Club from 1991 to 2022), is a semi professional football club in Australia based in Melbourne, Victoria. The club was founded by Serbian Australians in 1963 and currently competes in the Victoria Premier League 1.

== History ==
=== Early history ===
The club was founded in 1963. In 1966 the club became a member of the Victorian Provisional League and in the same year renamed to Carlton Serbia. The club was founded primarily by members of the St. Sava Orthodox Church in Carlton, Victoria. Carlton Serbia played most of their home games in the inner suburbs of Melbourne and featured mainly players from the local Serbian Australian Community. Subsequently, the club merged with Ringwood United and became known as Ringwood Serbia. In 1991 the club became Fitzroy City or Fitzroy Serbia and played its games at the old ground of the ex VFL/AFL club Fitzroy Lions at Edinburgh Gardens in Fitzroy, noticeable players of the club including Nik Kovacevic, Zlatko Mihajlovic, Miki Sedlarevic, Sasha Milenkovic and Nick Gameras. Enjoying their best results ever:

- 1969 Victorian Provisional League champions
- 1971 Victorian District League Central Divisions Champions
- 1972 Victorian Provisional League Champions
- 2000 Victorian State League 2 NE Champions
- 2023 Victorian State League 1 SE Champions
- 2024 Victoria Premier League 2 Champions

Supporters and Legacy Fitzroy City "Srbija" is the oldest Serbian backed soccer club in Victoria. The supporters of Fitzroy City "Srbija" are known as the "Melbourne Srbija Firma" (MSF).

=== Premier League Years ===
Fitzroy City Serbia rose to the Victorian Premier League (VPL) in 2002, the highest level in Victorian football at which the club has competed. The season concluded with the club being relegated, finishing on 22 points. Among several notable moments, the club’s standout performance came in a 4–1 victory over the then-mighty Port Melbourne Sharks.

=== 2000-2020 ===
On 2 February 2000, Fitzroy City had the honour of hosting an iconic exhibition match against former European and World Champions Red Star Belgrade in Melbourne at Heidelberg United's Olympic Park in Heidelberg West, Victoria. Despite taking an early lead, Fitzroy were defeated 3–1. Bojo Jevdević earned man of the match honours, holding Red Star at bay throughout the first half.

During the 2006 season, the club competed in State League 3 SE, finishing 6th. Nikola Veljović ended the season as the league’s top scorer with 23 goals.

In 2009, Fitzroy City reclaimed pride by winning the Victorian Provisional League Division 1 South East, capped by a 6–0 final-day victory over rivals Mooroolbark. Nathan Jones finished as the club's top scorer with 10 goals.

In 2010, Fitzroy City returned to State League 3 finishing 5th. Henry Wootton earned the club's Best and Fairest and Top Goal Scorer awards. Other winners included Shannon Griffin (Best Young Player), Valina Clearwater (Women's Best and Fairest), and Prudence Robertson (Women's Top Goal Scorer).

The 2012 season concluded on a high note, with Fitzroy City finishing second behind Doveton and ahead of Springvale Bosna, securing promotion to State League 2 NW.

=== Recent Years ===
In 2024, FC Melbourne Srbija secured promotion to Victoria Premier League 1, where the club currently competes, and reached the Round of 16 in the Australia Cup, marking their most successful national campaign to date. The club capped off the year by being crowned champions of the 2024 Karadjordje Cup.

2025 saw FC Melbourne Srbija establish itself in Victoria Premier League 1 by reaching the Promotion Playoff Semi-Final, where the club was narrowly defeated 4–3 by Melbourne City FC. The team also finished as back-to-back Champions of the Karadjordje Cup, adding to its growing list of honours.

== Gallery ==
FC Melbourne Srbija Official Club Crest

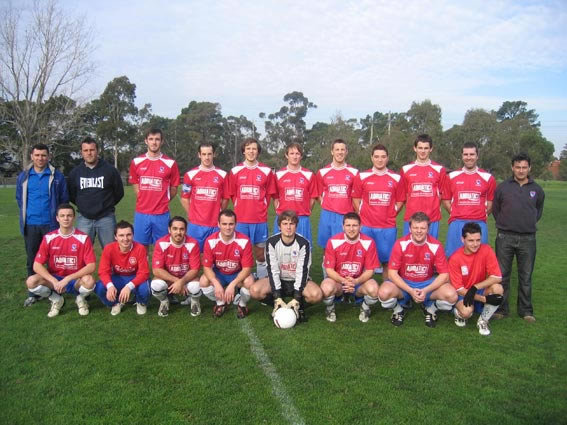
Fitzroy Srbija

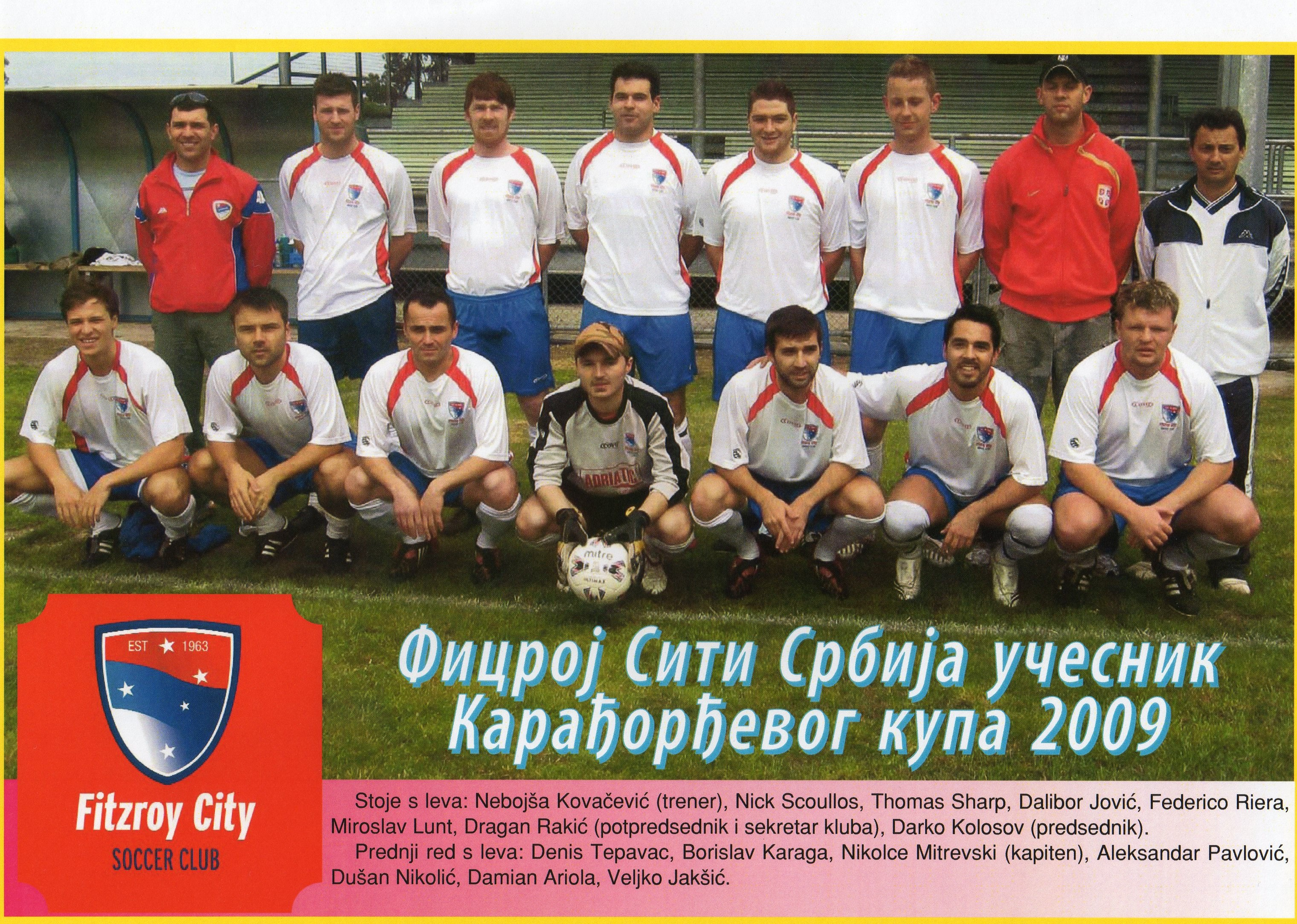
Fitzroy Srbija

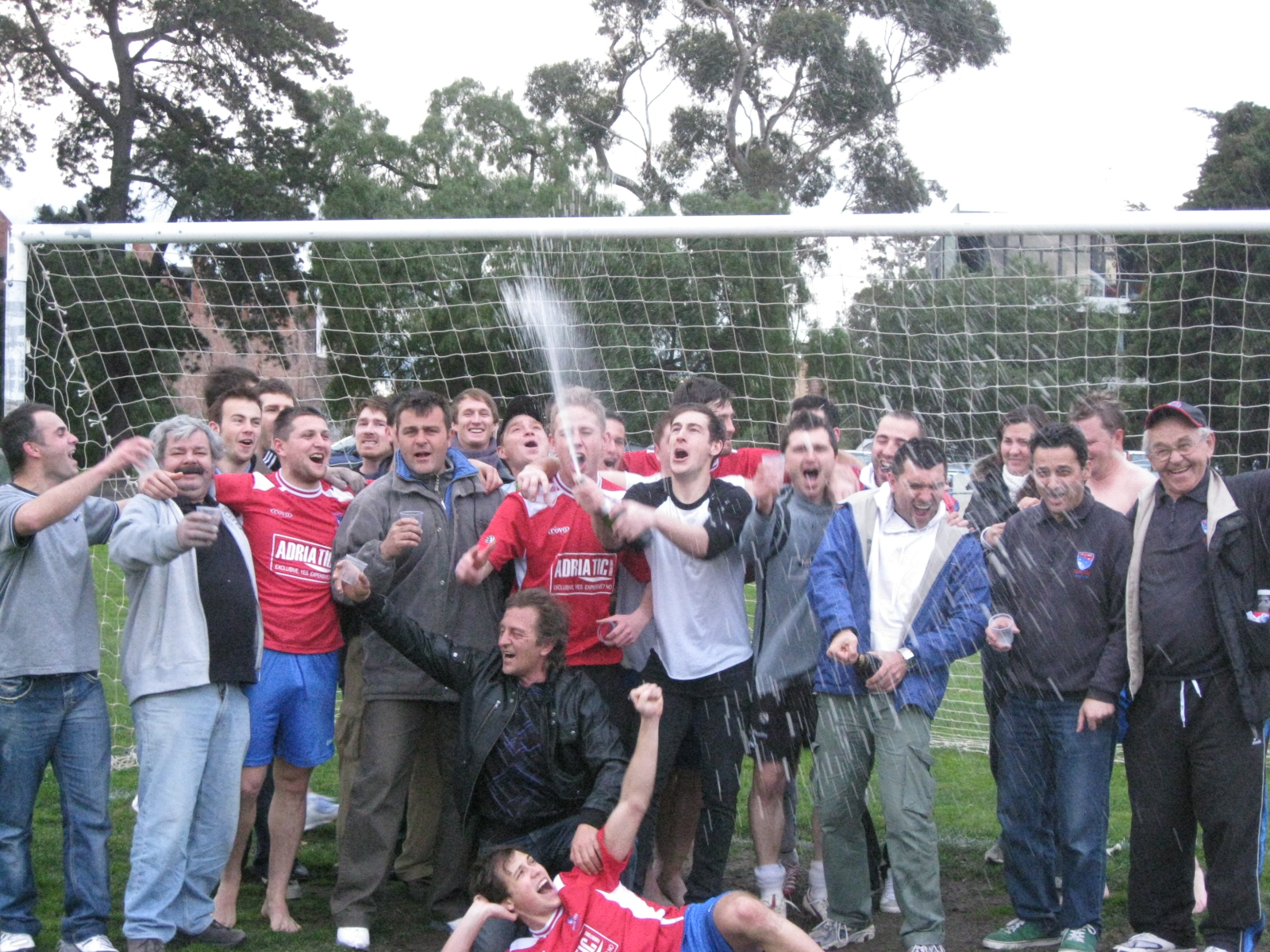
Fitzroy Srbija

== Current squad ==
As of March 2026

Note: Flags indicate national team as defined under FIFA eligibility rules; some limited exceptions apply. Players may hold more than one non-FIFA nationality.

No.	Pos.	Nation	Player
1	GK	AUS	Jarrod Hill
2	DF	USA	Colby Parton
4	DF	AUS	Jackson Necovski
6	DF	AUS	Thomas Lakić
6	MF	AUS	Cameron Davies
7	FW	AUS	Ryan Brown
8	FW	CAN	Owen Sheppard
9	FW	ENG	Jack Hindle
10	MF	AUS	Bojan Trifunov
11	FW	AUS	Marcus Dimanche
14	GK	AUS	Alexander Golikidis

No.	Pos.	Nation	Player
15	FW	AUS	Thomas Lingurovski
17	FW	AUS	Ben Davine
19	DF	JPN	Takumu Ito
20	MF	ITA	Emidio Rossi
21	DF	AUS	Aaron Bazenski
24	FW	AUS	Delarno Pharoe
39	DF	AUS	Jack Kamper
66	DF	AUS	Connor Lees
77	MF	AUS	Marco Cannatelli
80	DF	AUS	Nathan Dib
88	FW	AUS	Daniel Hudson

== Achievements ==
=== League ===
- Victoria Premier League 2
  - Champions (x1) : 2024
- Victorian State League 1 South-East
  - Champions (x1) : 2023
- Victorian State League Division 3
  - Runner-up (x1) : 2012
- Victorian State League Division 1
  - Runners-up(x1) : 2001
- Victorian State League Division 2
  - Champions (x2) : 2000, 2019
- Victorian State League Division 3
  - Runner-up (x1) : 1999
- Victorian Provisional League Division 1
  - Champions (x1) : 2009

=== Cup ===
- Karadjordje Cup
  - Champions : 1988, 1997, 2022, 2024, 2025

== Top club goal scorers ==
- 2025 – Ben Devine – 8
- 2024 – Luka Ninković – 13
- 2023 – Rikuo Kanakubo – 8
- 2022 – Henrique Pimenta – 10
- 2019 – James Papadimitriou – N/A
- 2018 – Aleksandar Hrkalović – N/A
- 2017 – Aleksandar Hrkalović – 11
- 2016 – Danilo Bonilla – 12
- 2015 – Souheil Azagane – 10
- 2014 – Joshua D'Alessi – 10
- 2013 – Aleks Dimitrijević – 5
- 2012 – James Stellini – 7
- 2011 – Nathan Jones – 7
- 2010 – Henry Wootton – 13
- 2009 – Nathan Jones – 10
- 2008 – Stewart Peuterer – 13
- 2007 – Stewart Peuterer – 8
- 2006 – Nikola Veljović – 17
- 2005 – Ignjat Filipović – 7
- 2004 – Aca Stevanović – 4
- 2003 – Ivan Jovanović – 4
- 2002 – Vasko Trpevski – 5
- 2001 – Zlatko Mihajlović – 13
- 2000 – Michael Maljanek – 20 (State League Div 2 NW Top Scorer)
- 1999 – Miroslav Nikolić – 10
- 1998 – Rados Krašić – 9
- 1997 – Sasa Milenković – 5
- 1996 – Nick Gameras – 10
- 1995 – Marjan Marinković & Nick Gameras – 5
- 1994 – Sasha Milenković – 8
