= Altona City SC =

Altona City Soccer Club
- Full name: Altona City Soccer Club
- Founded: 1965
- Ground: H.C. Kim Reserve, Altona
- Men's Coach: Michael Calandrella
- Women's Coach: Gustavo Flores
- League: Victoria Premier League 2
- 2026: 13th of 14 (relegated)
- Website: https://altonacitysc.com
Home colours	Away colours

Altona City SC is an Australian all-inclusive association football (soccer) club from Altona, Victoria, a suburb of Melbourne, Victoria. The club currently competes in the Victoria Premier League 2. The club was formed in 1965 with four fundamental countries contributing it its establishment and growth - England, Scotland, Malta and The Netherlands.The club played in the Victorian State League from 1977 to 1981.

In the 2000s the club then come one of the heavy hitters in women's soccer having a team in the WPL, The club's most notable alumni include Socceroos great Alan Edward Davidson and current Socceroo Jason Davidson. The club has produced many Socceroos and is one of major development clubs in Victoria.

== Notable players ==
- Alan Davidson – Former Australian Association football player / Nottingham Forest FC 84-85 / Padang FA Malaysia 1992 - voted the league's best player / Three World Cups / 1988 Seoul Olympics / Socceroo Captain / Football Hall of Fame 2001 / Named in Australia's Best 11 ever Socceroo Team in 2012
- Jason Davidson – Professional player for Ulsan Hyundai 2019 / Perth Glory 2018 - 2019 / Australian U20 squad 2009 / World Cup 2014 / AFC Asian Cup 2015
- Vlado Bozinovski U23 × 3 / Full Caps x 6 1 Goal / Seoul Olympics 1988
- John Little – U20 Australia
- Steve Laurie – Joey's Australia U17's
- Colin Cooper – Joey's Australia U17's
- Tony Cassar – Order of Australia

== Recent History ==
The club was in financial ruins in 2013 with several former players led by Joe Tanti and Sam Borg pulled the club back from the brink of closing its doors. After achieving promotion in the 2015 season, Altona City appointed Andy O'Dell as head coach for the remainder of the 2016 season, eventually finishing the season in third place.

In 2017, City won the Victorian State League Division 2 North-West championship and subsequent promotion. Ayodeji Omoboye won the club's golden boot with 17 goals and was runner-up in the league golden boot. After the conclusion of the 2017 season, head coach Andy O'Dell announced his resignation and the job was handed to Paul Donnelly.

In 2018, Altona City consolidated its position in Victorian State League Division 1 with a ninth-place finish.

After the disruption of COVID, the committee of Altona City Soccer Club is focused and committed to success both on and off the pitch in 2022. This includes the appointment of new Senior Men's Coach, Michael Calandrella and Senior Women's Coach Gustavo Flores and together with Hobsons Bay City Council the development of new clubrooms at HC Kim Reserve.

In 2026 Altona City now competes in the Victorian Premier League 2.

== Current squad ==
Senior Men's Team 2021

Note: Flags indicate national team as defined under FIFA eligibility rules; some limited exceptions apply. Players may hold more than one non-FIFA nationality.

No.	Pos.	Nation	Player
—	GK	AUS	Kile Kennedy
—	GK	AUS	Daniel Zilic
—	DF	AUS	Ross Harvey (Captain)
—	MF	AUS	Matthew Trotter
—	DF	AUS	Barry Devlin
—	DF	NIR	Sam O'Regan
—	MF	AUS	Cameron Scerri
—	MF	AUS	Jamie Gazelle
—	MF	ENG	Jon Brooks

No.	Pos.	Nation	Player
—	MF	AUS	Simon Tolli
—	MF	ENG	Jesse Kewley-Graham
—	MF	AUS	Jonathan Sebastian Munoz
—	MF	AUS	Macmillan Egan
—	FW	JPN	Rin Takagi
—	FW	AUS	Anthony Laus
—	FW	AUS	Liam Mizzi

Senior Women's Team 2021

Note: Flags indicate national team as defined under FIFA eligibility rules; some limited exceptions apply. Players may hold more than one non-FIFA nationality.

No.	Pos.	Nation	Player
—	DF	AUS	Sophia Dimitriou (Captain)
—	DF	AUS	Kiahann Namana
—	DF	AUS	Emma Fonua
—	DF	AUS	Jamie Flores
—	DF	AUS	Rebecca Kovac
—	MF	AUS	Ally Downie
—	MF	AUS	Denise Horner
—	MF	AUS	Maretta Palia

No.	Pos.	Nation	Player
—	MF	AUS	Melissa Gugliara
—	MF	AUS	Renee Somoza
—	MF	AUS	Stella Campanaro
—	FW	AUS	Sabina Ganic
—	FW	AUS	Peta Lepic
—	FW	AUS	Lisa Georgopoulos
—	GK	AUS	Irena "The Walrus" Vecris

== Honours ==
- Victorian State League 1 North-West
  - Champions (1) : 2023
- Victorian State League Division 2 North-West
  - Champions (1) : 2017
