= Moreland City FC =

Moreland City
- Full name: Moreland City Football Club
- Founded: 1916
- Ground: Campbell Reserve Coburg, Victoria
- Capacity: 2,500
- Captain: Corey Thomas
- President: Tony Hofer
- Training Champion: Ryan Burns
- Coach: Zivko Kolevski
- League: Victoria Premier League 2
- 2026: 14th of 14 (relegated)
- Website: https://www.morelandcityfc.au
Home colours

Moreland City Football Club is an Australian soccer club based in Coburg, Victoria, Melbourne. The club currently competes in the Victoria Premier League 2.

== History ==
The Coburg/Coburg United soccer club was established in 1916.

In 1985, Moreland FC merged with Park Rangers to form Moreland Park Rangers

In 1990, Coburg United merged with Moreland Park Rangers, to become Moreland City FC. In 1991, the club competed in the Victorian State League Division 3.

Moreland had successive relegations in 1992 and 1993, falling from Victorian State League Division 3 to Victorian Provisional League Division 1, but were promoted back to State League 4 after winning the league in 1995.

The club was again promoted in 1998 to State League 3 after taking out the league title. In 2000, City moved up to State League Division 2 Nth-West after a restructuring of Victorian football.

The Club stayed in State League 2 North West for the next eight years, until their relegation in 2008. Moreland immediately bounced back in 2009, achieving promotion with a second-placed finish. In 2010, former player and coach Maurice Bisetto took over. City were expected to be relegation candidates, but managed to finish a surprising third, with Club legend Kam Simsek winning the league golden boot. In 2010, Moreland endured a similar season, finishing in fourth place. Sam Wade won the League Best & Fairest and fellow Welshman Darren Griffiths took out the League Golden Boot.

In 2012, Moreland City finished in second place, qualifying for the promotion playoff, but lost to Box Hill United SC. Welshman Adam Orme won the League Golden Boot award.

In 2013 Moreland City they took out the State League Division 2 North West League Championship, reaching the State League One for the first time since the club was re-founded in 1990.

After a restructuring of football in Victoria, resulting in the creation of the National Premier Leagues Victoria, Moreland City remained in the State League One North West division, which was now the third, rather than the second tier of football in Victoria, below the NPL and NPL1 divisions.

Moreland City took out the State League One title in 2014, pipping Preston Lions FC by three points. The title win meant they were offered, and subsequently accepted, a place in the National Premier Leagues Victoria 2. They were placed in the NPL2 West conference for 2015. The club finished in 3rd place in NPL2 West and 5th overall.

Heading into season 2016, City added former Welsh Premier League player Emmanuel James Will Udo and former VPL Golden Boot winner Trent Rixon. Udo received a call up to the South Sudan national team for their upcoming African Cup of Nations qualifiers against Benin following his seven-goal haul in the opening four matches of the season that saw City manage seven points. Moreland finished in 7th place in the 10-team league in 2016.

In 2017, City finished in 3rd place in NPL2 West.

Prior to the 2018 season, Moreland City signed former A-League player Jesse Makarounas. Moreland finished in 2nd place in the NPL2 East. As a result, they faced St Albans Saints in the NPL2 promotion playoff, winning 4–1. They then faced off against nine-time state champions Green Gully for a spot in the National Premier Leagues Victoria top division in 2019. Moreland gave up a 2–0 lead, conceding twice in second-half stoppage-time and then another in extra-time to miss their chance on promotion.

== Ground ==
Moreland City play out of Campbell Reserve in Coburg, Victoria. In October 2018, Moreland unveiled a new, female-friendly pavilion, worth $1.5 million. The project also included the refurbishment of the two football pitches including irrigation, drainage and resurfacing with warm season grass.

== Honours ==
- NPL Victoria 2/Victoria Premier League 1 Champions 2022
- Victorian State League Division 1 North West Champions 2014

== Current squad ==
=== Senior squad ===
Note: Flags indicate national team as defined under FIFA eligibility rules; some limited exceptions apply. Players may hold more than one non-FIFA nationality.

No.	Pos.	Nation	Player
1	GK	AUS	Alexander Kondoleon
2	MF	AUS	Curtis Miley
3	DF	AUS	Nick Bavcar
4	DF	AUS	Michael Tzoutzidis
5	DF	AUS	Kur Arob
6	MF	AUS	Fletcher Fulton
7	DF	AUS	Luke Jurcic
8	MF	WAL	Corey Thomas
9	FW	CHI	José Arancibia
10	MF	AUS	Chudiar Tharjiath
11	FW	AUS	Apai Ukuno

No.	Pos.	Nation	Player
12	MF	AUS	Matt Sporle
15	MF	AUS	Luca Toro
16	DF	AUS	Eligian Kifle
17	MF	AUS	Jake Ciantar
18	MF	IRL	Deane Watters
19	FW	AUS	Kasra Karamad
20	MF	AUS	Daniel Tsafkas
21	FW	AUS	Diego Cuba
22	MF	AUS	Santo Aguek
23	MF	AUS	Nuoman Aliy
27	MF	AUS	Aidan Croucher
—	FW	SRI	Rahul Suresh
