= Soccer in Geelong =

History of soccer in Victoria, Australia

Soccer in the Geelong region has been played in formal leagues since 1914.

== League, clubs and governance ==
Football Victoria Geelong is the governing body for the game in the region - run by Football Victoria with a regional advisory panel made up of member clubs and representatives.

== History ==
Soccer in Geelong, Australia dates as far back as the late 1800s where mostly British migrants during the early colonization of the Victorian gold rush participated in a variety of ball games similar to British Association rules (soccer) and rugby. British migrants employed at the emerging industries took part in formal games in Geelong from at least 1914 when the Geelong City club was formed.

After World War I interrupted the establishment of the game in the region, a huge influx of the British migrants and the burgeoning industrial sector in Geelong aided the creation of the Geelong and District Soccer League in 1926. The 1930s saw the economic depression curtail recreational sport as jobs and employment take precedent. Following World War II, the arrival of European migrants, mainly from Britain and the Netherlands initially, then later from eastern Europe, began to transform football in the Geelong region. The emergence of new multicultural football clubs helped to drive the game through from the 1970s to the 1990s.

In the early 2000s, strong population growth, growing football participation, and the mainstream acceptance of the game established a new dynamic of football in the region. Four new clubs emerged in the Bellarine Peninsula region of Geelong from 2000 to 2009.

=== Timeline ===
The timeline of association football (soccer) in the Geelong region of Australia.

1884

- An exhibition match of by the Anglo-Australian Football Association is played between Carlton and Richmond club at Corio oval.

1914

- The Geelong City club is formed. Their first match is played against the Naval College team (Osbourne house, North Geelong).
- Geelong City play Fitzroy District, then play Yarraville at the Federal Woollen Mills ground in North Geelong. A match is arranged with Melbourne Thistle at Bakers Oval in Geelong West.

1920

- 'Some two thousand people' watch a charity match on Monday, 26 April 1920. It was played at Geelong Oval between a team from the crew from warship HMAS Platypus and the Victorian Amateur British Football Association team Windsor. The game is kicked off by Commander Edward Boyle VC.
- An Osborne House team plays just four games in the 1920 Victorian Soccer Football Association season and disbands shortly after.

1923

- Geelong United Soccer Club is formed at a meeting of 28 men at Belmont common. Elected were Mr Arthur.D.Ive (president), Donaldson (vice-president), Drinnan (treasurer) and C. Ensby (secretary) to lead a team of mostly Scots and Englishmen.

1924

- Geelong United plays its first league match against Melbourne Welsh at the Hope Street ground in Geelong West and participates in the Dockerty Cup but is eliminated in the first round.

1926

- The Geelong and District Soccer League is formed. There are seven teams: Geelong City, Ford Recreation Club, Valley Worsted Mills, Overseas Club, Queenscliff Garrison, HMAS Brisbane and North Geelong. Geelong United who were playing in the Melbourne competition are disbanded to get the league launched. The arrival of workers for Geelong's new industry increase the need for pitches - a battle that will continue for clubs across the region for the next century.
- The Geelong Soccer League secures the use of the Friendly Societies' reserve (now Howard Glover reserve). It will be a base for Soccer in Geelong for years to come.
- The Madden Cup competition is established by William G. Madden (President of the Geelong and the Western District Football Association) who donates the cup trophy. Madden, a former councillor and Mayor of Geelong West Council, passes away in 1928.
- The Caledonian Charity Shield competition is started.

1927

- The Geelong Soccer League changes its name to the Geelong and Western District Soccer Association.
- New club Caledonians is formed.
- Union Jack are formed. Fred West the first president.
- Players from various Geelong teams are selected for a Geelong association team to play a match against Preston Soccer Club on Easter Saturday at the Hope street ground in Geelong West.

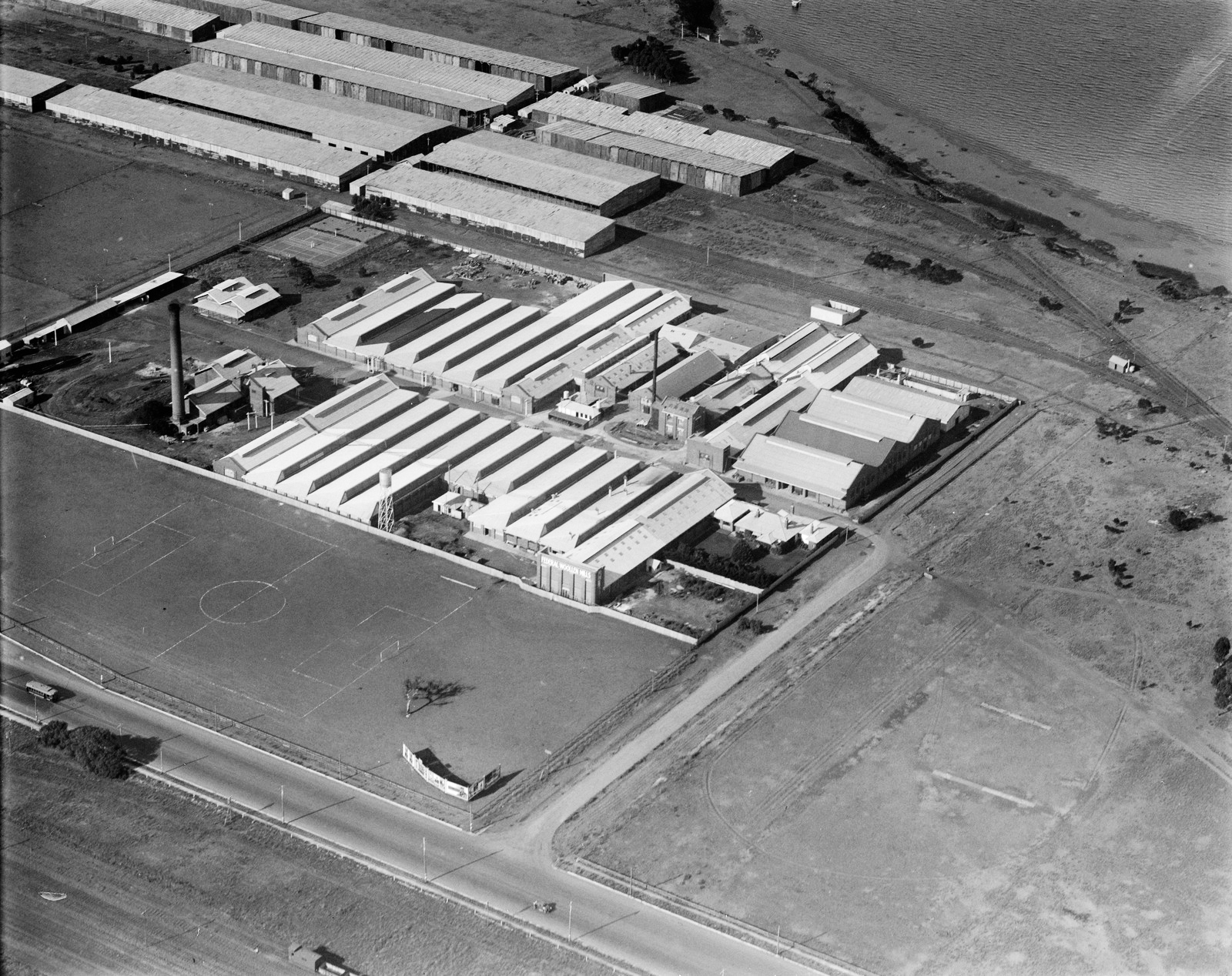
A football pitch used by the Federal Woollen Mills team in North Geelong. Photo circa 1925/1935

1929

- Federal Woollen Mills and Geelong Wanderers enters the league.

1930/31

- The 1930 Madden cup is won by Melbourne's Northumberland & Durham United beating Geelong's Valley Mills team. In the mid-1990s the Madden Cup was still in possession of a descendent of Elijah ‘Sandy’ Hammond who captained the side.
- Valley Mills beat Colac Thistle 3–1 to win the Caledonian shield.
- The Great Depression takes hold across Australia. Only four teams remain in the league in 1930, the league folds in 1931.

1934

- Geelong United is revived to play in the Melbourne metropolitan competition.

1949/50

- The Geelong league is restarted with Geelong United, Geelong Celtic, International Harvester and Industrial Service Engineers play in the league.
- The post world war II migrant boom is underway across Australia, large number of European migrants will grow and transform the game in Geelong over the next decade.
- Dutch migrant workers form Shell A and Shell B teams during the construction of Shell's Geelong Oil Refinery (1951–54).
  Norlane Olympia team 1960

1952

- The Geelong 'International' Soccer club is founded by the Italian community and plays in blue and black vertical stripes.

1955

- The Geelong 'International' Soccer club is suspended by the Victorian Soccer Association after the coach attacked a referee. The club is soon re-established with Fanny Borsari as president who is 'the first women to be president of a soccer club in Australia'. Fanny's husband Nino Borsari was president of Brunswick Juventus. The club later became known as the IAMA club (Italian Australian Migrants Association).
- The Geelong Scottish soccer club is formed by Bill Dorris (senior), John Barr and Bob Barclay at a meeting at the North Geelong Fire Station - Geelong Scottish would later to become Geelong Rangers.
- The local Dutch newspaper De Nieuwe Wereld (The New World) sponsors a post-season lightning premiership competition named the 'New World Cup' open to Ballarat, Melbourne and Geelong teams that runs until 1960. From this event the German team would become Corio Soccer Club.
- Corio Soccer club is formed by Norman Haigh, J. Hancock and Harry Pettig and made up of mostly German migrants from the defunct International Harvester team.

1956

- The Dutch influence on local football increases as Dutch teams now make up five of the eight teams in the Geelong competition.

1957

- Footscray's Croatia club was brought to Geelong for a short period by Joe Radojevic when he took over as secretary of Croatia from Tony Durakovic.

1958

- There are eight teams in the local Geelong League; British, Corio (German), Olympia 1 and 2 (Dutch), DSG (Dutch Society of Geelong), Ukrania, Scottish and Toldi (Hungarian).
- Geelong Macedonia Soccer Club is established, based out of Harold Hurst Reserve in Herne Hill - later known as Geelong SC.

1959

- Bell Park Sports Club was founded by Frank Vanjek and Gino Tromba.

1963

- The newly formed Victorian Soccer Federation removed Geelong clubs from its Metropolitan competitions, consigning teams to the Ballarat and Geelong Districts Soccer Association in 1964.

1964

- Brintons Soccer Club formed.

1964 and 1965

- Bell Park are the undefeated champions.

1965

- West Geelong, the second local Macedonian club was formed.

1967

- North Geelong Croatia is formed by Mirko Hrkač, Ivan Sesar, Vinko Radojević and Aldo Siketa.

1975

- Rangers move from their ground at Calvert Street Hamlyn Park to Myers Reserve.

1977

- North Geelong Croatia spend $12,000 to purchase land in Lara to establish a future home ground away from the shared facility of Hume reserve. The first league game at Elcho park comes nine years later in 1986 against Essendon City.

1978

- Deakin Ducks Football Club is an established.

1981

- Councillor Gerry Smith presided over the formation of The Association of Geelong Soccer Clubs. Aiming to create a National Soccer League team in Geelong.
- The Geelong Advertiser Cup competition is launched by Bill Walsh, Bob Kocsiki, Billy Dorris and Jim Lippelgoes. Bell Park beat Hamlyn Rangers 1–0 to take the silverware in the first year.

1983/1984

- Hamlyn Rangers go back to back - winning the Metropolitan League division four and division three the next season.

1986

- Corio Bay Sports Club (soccer and cricket) is formed.

1987

- Corio SC merges with Geelong United.

1989/90/91

- North Geelong win Division Two and then Division One of the State League.

1991

- Bell Park appoint Tommy Cumming is as playing coach.

1992

- North Geelong coached by Branko Culina win the Victorian Premier League (defeating Brunswick Juventus in extra time) in its first year in the top flight of Victoria football.
- Barwon Soccer club founded by Dave Rea.

1996

- Surfside Waves is founded - later renamed Ocean Grove Soccer Club.

1999

- Lara Soccer Club is founded by John Karounos and a group of dedicated volunteers.

2001

- Surf Coast FC is founded.

2004

- Bellarine Sharks A.F.C.is founded as the participation continues to grow rapidly across the Bellarine Peninsula and the Surfcoast.

2008

- Barwon Heads Soccer Club founded.

2009

- Drysdale Soccer Club is founded by Geoff Briggs.

2010

- The Geelong Regional Football Association votes to had over running of the local leagues to Football Victoria.

2011

- The Bellarine Cup is started. The handicap event runs for at least three years.

2012

- Golden Plains Soccer Club is founded.

2014

- The Geelong Galaxy Girls club is formed after the new Geelong Galaxy entity withdraw their bid for a women's National Premier League licence.

2015

- 21,289 fans watch Melbourne Victory play Perth Glory FC at Kardinia Park.
- Pitch four at Hume reserve is converted into a water retention pond at a time when soccer participation for boys and girls surpassed all other sports across Australia. Hume reserve was once a facility of six pitches that had been gradually reduced as land had been sold off for industrial development.

2016

- Leopold FC is founded by Jared Larkins and Mitchell Vials.The club had over 100 registered players in its first season in 2017.
- Geelong Galaxy United FC is formed as a joint venture of Greater Geelong Galaxy Girls and Surfcoast FC and are licensed to play as the only regional team in the new NPLW league from their home ground of Banyul-warri Fields Torquay. Vince Ierardo is head coach in their first season as Galaxy reach the grand final of the WNPL league losing to Calder United.
- Melbourne Victory beat Atlético Madrid 1 - 0 at Simonds Stadium in Geelong in front of 16,652 fans as part of the Spanish Giant's pre-season tour in Australia.

2017

- A consortium led by Geelong football identity Steve Horvat campaign to establish an A-league team in Geelong as the A-league announces expansion plans - Victoria Patriots as the working title. Eventually the campaign morphed into the Western Melbourne Group, who in 2018 won the license to establish Western United in Melbourne's west.

2018

- The first stage of the Drysdale Sporting Precinct is complete - Drysdale SC move in.
- A $2 million FIFA standard synthetic pitch is opened at the Leisuretime Centre in Norlane.
- Armstrong Creek United is founded by Michael Parker, Moses Machao and Gavin Walker.

2019

- North Geelong Warriors hosted local rivals Geelong SC in the first ever Geelong NPL Derby. The match is witnessed by over 1,500 spectators.

2021

- The Surfside Waves make the leap from the Geelong Division one competition to the fifth tier of the Victorian State League competition.

2022

- Geelong Council purchase the land and assets of Bell Park Sports Club for $2.55 million, to ensure the club's survival.
- Corio Soccer Club moves into the newly developed $3 million pavilion and change rooms at Hume Reserve in Bell Park.

2023

- Breakwater Eagles move to the vacated Howard Glover reserve in East Geelong from the privately owned facility at White Eagle House. Breakwater are the second club in two years to extricate itself from a private football facility in favour of a Council owned facility.

2024

- Breakwater Eagles change their name to Geelong City Football Club to better reflect their new home ground location. The name was first used 110 years ago by Geelong's first official team.
- The Australian women's national team beat Chinese Taipei 6–0 at GMHBA stadium in front of 30,097 fans.
- In late 2024, Geelong Galaxy FC move into Myers Reserve, Bell Post Hill - the home ground of Geelong Rangers.

2025

- Roy Hay - Local sports writer, historian and author is inducted into the Football Australia Hall of Fame for his lifelong dedication to documenting the history of football in Geelong and Australia.
- A business case identifies Sutcliffe Reserve in Corio as the preferred location for the Geelong Regional Football Hub.

2026

- The Geelong Community Cup preseason tournament is cancelled due to extreme heat.
- The Western Heights College U15 boys soccer team are runners-up in the Bill Turner Cup - a national tournament of 465 boys teams (2026) from public schools across Australia.

== See also ==
- Football Victoria Geelong
- Geelong Community Cup
- Soccer in Victoria
- Roy Hay - Geelong soccer writer
