= 2020 FFA Cup preliminary rounds =

Qualification rounds for 2020 season of Australian soccer competition

Tournament details
- Country: Australia
- Teams: 765, though only 635 played or were drawn to play

Final positions
- Champions: Event Cancelled

The 2020 FFA Cup preliminary rounds were the qualifying competition initially meant to decide 22 of the 32 teams to take part in the 2020 FFA Cup (now known as the Australia Cup). Some preliminary matches were held in February and March, prior to the competition being suspended in mid-March due to the COVID-19 pandemic in Australia.

The competition was cancelled on 3 July.

One of the member federation-based competitions resumed from July (for the Lakoseljac Cup in Tasmania).

== Schedule ==
The fixtures for the competition are as follows.

Round	Number of fixtures	ACT	NSW	NNSW	NT	QLD	SA	TAS	VIC	WA
First qualifying round	31 + 3 byes	–	–	–	–	–	–	–	8–16 Feb	–
Second qualifying round	17	–	–	–	–	–	–	–	22–23 Feb	–
First round	32 + 1 bye	–	–	–	–	–	–	–	28 Feb–2 Mar	29 Feb–7 Mar
Second round	143 + 53 byes	–	11–17 Mar	22–23 Feb	–	21 Feb–14 Mar	–	–	6–9 Mar	14–15 Mar
Third round	partially played	–	–	29 Feb–1 Mar	–	28 Feb–21 Mar	–	29 Feb	13–16 Mar	–
Fourth round	partially played	–	–	14–15 Mar	–	14 Mar	–	11 Jul	–	–
Fifth round	overall competition cancelled by this time	–	–	–	–	–	–	5–30 Sep	–	–
Sixth round	overall competition cancelled by this time	–	–	–	–	–	–	31 Oct–1 Nov	–	–
Seventh round	overall competition cancelled by this time	–	–	–	–	–	–	7 Nov	–	–

- Some round dates in respective Federations overlap due to separate scheduling of Zones/Sub-Zones.
- Member federation matches played or scheduled since the overall competition was cancelled are shown in grey.

== Format ==
The preliminary rounds structures are as follows, and refer to the different levels in the unofficial Australian soccer league system:

- First qualifying round:

- 65 Victorian clubs level 9 and below entered this stage.

- Second qualifying round:

- 34 Victorian clubs progressed to this stage.

- First round:

- 56 Victorian clubs (17 from the previous round and 39 level 8) entered this stage.
- 9 Western Australian clubs (Regional areas) entered this stage.

- Second round:

- 121 New South Wales clubs (level 6 and below) entered this stage.
- 48 Northern New South Wales clubs (level 4 and below) entered this stage.
- 90 Queensland clubs (level 4 and below) entered this stage.
- 62 Victorian clubs (28 from the previous round and 34 level 7) entered this stage.
- 19 Western Australian clubs (5 from the previous round and 17 level 5 and below) entered this stage.

- Third round:

- 12 ACT clubs (level 3 and below) entered this stage, although no games were played.
- 88 New South Wales clubs (65 from the previous round and 23 level 4–5) entered this stage.
- 45 Northern New South Wales clubs (8 from the previous round and 13 level 3) entered this stage.
- 79 Queensland clubs (59 from the previous round and 20 level 4 and below) entered this stage.
- 54 South Australian clubs (level 2 and below) entered this stage.
- 10 Tasmanian clubs (level 3) entered this stage.
- 101 Victorian clubs (31 from the previous round and 70 levels 3 to 6) entered this stage.

- Fourth round:

- 8 ACT clubs (level 2) entered this stage, although no games were played.
- 8 Northern New South Wales clubs (8 from the previous round – Northern Zone) participated in this stage before the competition was initially suspended and later cancelled due to the COVID-19 pandemic in Australia.
- 9 Northern Territory clubs (level 2 and below) entered this stage.
- 64 Queensland clubs (40 from the previous round and 24 level 2 and 3) entered this stage.
- 16 Tasmanian clubs (8 from the previous round and 8 level 2) entered this stage, with the competition resuming on 11 July.

- Fifth round:

- 3 Queensland clubs (from Far North Queensland and North Queensland) reached this stage before the competition was abandoned.
- 8 Tasmanian clubs progressed to this stage. Matches were held after the overall competition was cancelled.

- Sixth round:

- 4 Tasmanian clubs progressed to this stage.

- Seventh round:

- 2 Tasmanian clubs progressed to this stage, which was the Grand Final of the Milan Lakoseljac Cup.

== Key to abbreviations ==
Federation	Zone
NSW = New South Wales	
NNSW = Northern New South Wales	NTH = North; STH = South
QLD = Queensland	CQ = Central Queensland; FNQ = Far North Queensland; MRF = Mackay Region; NQ = North Queensland
TAS = Tasmania	
VIC = Victoria	
WA = Western Australia	

== First qualifying round ==
Fed.	Zone	Tie no	Home team (Tier)	Score	Away team (Tier)
Victoria
VIC	–	1	Elcho Park Cardinals FC	1–2	St Kevin's Old Boys
VIC	–	2	Balmoral FC	w/o	Forest Rangers SC
VIC	–	3	Keilor Wolves SC	1–0	Epsom FC
VIC	–	4	Central Park Rangers	0–2	Mount Waverley City SC
VIC	–	5	Spring Gully United SC	4–2	Knox United
VIC	–	6	Macedon Blues United FC	4–2	Twin City Wanderers FC
VIC	–	7	Melton Phoenix FC	24–1	Melbourne Lions SC
VIC	–	8	Lara United FC	3–5	Yarra Jets FC
VIC	–	9	Albert Park SC	2–1	Pakenham United FC
VIC	–	10	Bunyip District FC	1–0	ETA Buffalo SC
VIC	–	11	Ballarat SC	w/o	Wyndham United SC
VIC	–	12	Old Melburnians SC	0–6	Tatura Soccer Club
VIC	–	13	Glen Waverley SC	5–0	Alphington FC
VIC	–	14	Monash SC (Newborough)	1–1†	Casey Panthers SC
Monash SC advance 4–3 on penalties.
VIC	–	15	Ballarat North United SC	4–1	Old Trinity Grammarians
VIC	–	16	Broadmeadow Stars SC	w/o	Maribyrnong Greens SC

Fed.	Zone	Tie no	Home team (Tier)	Score	Away team (Tier)
VIC	–	17	Breakwater Eagles SC	1–2	Castlemaine Goldfields FC
VIC	–	18	Mount Lilydale Old Collegians	3–2	Meadow Park SC
VIC	–	19	Tullamarine FC	0–4	Boronia SC
VIC	–	20	East Kew FC	1–1†	Deakin Ducks (9)
Deakin Ducks advance 3–1 on penalties.
VIC	–	21	Rosebud SC	2–3	Barwon SC
VIC	–	22	West Point SC	w/o	Reservoir Yeti SC
VIC	–	23	Glenroy Lions FC	3–1	FC Eaglehawk
VIC	–	24	Old Ivanhoe Grammarians	2–4†	Moonee Valley Knights FC
VIC	–	25	RMIT FC	1–6	Maidstone United SC
VIC	–	26	Glen Eira FC	2–1	Keon Park FC
VIC	–	27	South East United FC	3–1†	Warrnambool Rangers FC
VIC	–	28	Bacchus Marsh SC	0–12	Bundoora United FC
VIC	–	29	Aspendale SC	1–1†	White Star Dandenong SC
White Star Dandenong advance 4–3 on penalties.
VIC	–	30	Mitchell Rangers SC	w/o	Endeavour Hills Fire SC
VIC	–	31	Mount Martha SC	0–6	Shepparton South SC

Notes

- w/o = Walkover
- † = After Extra Time
- VIC Byes – Falcons 2000 (-), Hampton Park United Sparrows FC (-), Old Mentonians (-).

== Second qualifying round ==
Fed.	Zone	Tie no	Home team (Tier)	Score	Away team (Tier)
Victoria
VIC	–	1	Mount Waverley City SC	2–0	Castlemaine Goldfields FC
VIC	–	2	Glen Eira FC	0–5	Deakin Ducks (9)
VIC	–	3	Spring Gully United SC	1–2†	Bunyip District FC
VIC	–	4	Old Mentonians (-)	4–2	St Kevin's Old Boys
VIC	–	5	Mount Lilydale Old Collegians	w/o	Monash SC (Newborough)
VIC	–	6	Tatura Soccer Club	3–2	Falcons 2000 (-)
VIC	–	7	Hampton Park United Sparrows FC (-)	2–2†	Bundoora United FC
Hampton Park United Sparrows advance 4–2 on penalties.
VIC	–	8	Ballarat North United SC	4–0	South East United FC

Fed.	Zone	Tie no	Home team (Tier)	Score	Away team (Tier)
VIC	–	9	Keilor Wolves SC	0–3	Yarra Jets FC
VIC	–	10	Shepparton South SC	6–1	Melton Phoenix FC
VIC	–	11	Barwon SC	5–0	Glen Waverley SC
VIC	–	12	Balmoral FC	3–0	Moonee Valley Knights FC
VIC	–	13	Broadmeadows Stars SC	7–1	Mitchell Rangers SC
VIC	–	14	White Star Dandenong SC	0–5	Macedon Blues United FC
VIC	–	15	Maidstone United SC	3–1	Ballarat SC
VIC	–	16	West Point SC	0–5	Albert Park SC
VIC	–	17	Boronia SC	3–7†	Glenroy Lions FC

Notes

- w/o = Walkover
- † = After Extra Time

== First round ==
Fed	Zone	Tie no	Home team (Tier)	Score	Away team (Tier)
Victoria
VIC	–	1	Croydon City Arrows (8)	3–1	Monash SC (8)
VIC	–	2	Ringwood City SC (8)	2–1	Riversdale SC (8)
VIC	–	3	Somerville Eagles SC (8)	1–4	Endeavour United SC (8)
VIC	–	4	Spring Hills FC (8)	w/o	Bunyip District FC (-)
VIC	–	5	Yarra Jets FC (-)	4–1	FC Noble Hurricanes (8)
VIC	–	6	Seaford United SC (8)	3–0	Albert Park SC (-)
VIC	–	7	Golden Plains SC (8)	0–6	Glenroy Lions FC (-)
VIC	–	8	Deakin Ducks (9)	1–2†	Uni Hill Eagles FC (8)
VIC	–	9	Mount Lilydale Old Collegians	2–1	Hampton Park United Sparrows FC (-)
VIC	–	10	Macedon Blues United FC (-)	1–3	West Preston SC (8)
VIC	–	11	Barnestoneworth United Senior FC (8)	3–1	Kings Domain FC (8)
VIC	–	12	Marcellin Old Collegians (8)	1–1†	Lyndale United FC (8)
Lyndale United advance 4–3 on penalties.
VIC	–	13	Tatura Soccer Club (-)	w/o	Noble Park SC (8)
VIC	–	14	Thornbury Athletic (8)	0–1	Greenvale United SC (8)
VIC	–	15	Balmoral FC (-)	0–0†	Melbourne City SC (8)
Melbourne City advance 5–3 on penalties.
VIC	–	16	Laverton SC (8)	1–1†	Chelsea FC (8)
Chelsea FC advance 5–3 on penalties.

Fed	Zone	Tie no	Home team (Tier)	Score	Away team (Tier)
VIC	–	17	Bell Park SC (8)	0–1	Westside Strikers Caroline Springs SC (8)
VIC	–	18	Truganina Hornets SC (8)	1–4	Old Camberwell Grammarians (8)
VIC	–	19	Barwon SC (-)	8–1	Broadmeadows Stars SC (-)
VIC	–	20	Waverley Wanderers (8)	1–4	Watsonia Heights FC (8)
VIC	–	21	Noble Park United (8)	2–4	Chisholm United FC (8)
VIC	–	22	Brunswick Zebras (8)	2–2†	Gisborne SC (8)
Brunswick Zebras advance 4–3 on penalties.
VIC	–	23	North Melbourne Athletic FC (8)	w/o	Keysborough SC (8)
VIC	–	24	Ballarat North United SC (-)	2–3	Shepparton South SC (-)
VIC	–	25	Baxter SC (8)	0–2	Darebin United (8)
VIC	–	26	Mount Waverley City SC (-)	4–2	Old Mentonians (-)
VIC	–	27	Old Xaverians (8)	1–2	La Trobe University (8)
VIC	–	28	Maidstone United SC (-)	2–3	Dingley Stars (8)
Western Australia
WA	–	29	Busselton City FC (-)	1–0	Bunbury Dynamos FC
WA	–	30	Polonia FC (-)	2–1	Albany Rovers FC (-)
WA	–	31	La Fiamma Sporting Club (-)	w/o	Port Kennedy SC (-)
WA	–	32	Bunbury United SC (-)	3–1	Australind SC (-)

Notes

- w/o = Walkover
- † = After Extra Time
- WA Byes – Twin City Saints SC (-).

== Second round ==
Fed	Zone	Tie no	Home team (Tier)	Score	Away team (Tier)
New South Wales
NSW	–	1	Harrington United FC (-)	0–4	Liverpool Rangers FC (-)
NSW	–	2	Glebe Wanderers FC (-)	2–0	Bankstown RSL Dragons FC (7)
NSW	–	3	Tarrawanna Blueys SC (-)	3–2†	San Souci FC (-)
NSW	–	4	Forest Killarney FC (-)	10–0	Lugarno FC (-)
NSW	–	5	North Rocks SC (-)	3–2	Lane Cove FC (-)
NSW	–	6	Australian Catholic Uni FC (-)	2–3	Sydney CBD (-)
NSW	–	7	Peakhurst United FC (-)	3–2	Georges River FC (-)
NSW	–	8	Fairfield Patrician Brothers FC (-)	1–1†	Berowra FC (-)
Fairfield Patrician Brothers advance 3–2 on penalties.
NSW	–	9	Coogee United FC (-)	10–1	Emu Plains FC (-)
NSW	–	10	Blue Mountains FC (-)	0–1	Lindfield FC (-)
NSW	–	11	Southern & Ettalong FC (-)	7–3	Panorama FC (-)
NSW	–	12	West Ryde Rovers FC (-)	2–1	Winston Hills FC (-)
NSW	–	13	Picton Rangers FC (-)	1–0	Unanderra Hearts FC (-)
NSW	–	14	Forest Rangers FC (-)	0–2	Arncliffe Aurora FC (-)
NSW	–	15	Marulan FC (-)	1–4	Menai Hawks FC (-)
NSW	–	16	Maroubra United FC	6–4	Rouse Hill Rams FC (-)
NSW	–	17	Western Condors (-)	1–0	Gladesville Ravens Sports Club (-)
NSW	–	18	Penrith Rovers FC (-)	0–3	Port Kembla SC (-)
NSW	–	19	Lithgow Workmans SFC (-)	0–1	Holroyd Rangers SC (6)
NSW	–	20	Granville Waratahs SFC (-)	w/o	Auburn FC (-)
NSW	–	21	Putney Rangers FC (-)	8–2	Ararat FC (-)
NSW	–	22	Albion Park White Eagles FC (-)	31–0	Epping FC (-)
NSW	–	23	Castle Hill RSL FC (-)	1–0	Bomaderry FC (-)
NSW	–	24	Kellyville Colts SC (-)	1–4	Wollongong United (6)
NSW	–	25	Berkeley Vale SC (6)	3–0	Ashfield Pirates FC (-)
NSW	–	26	Umina United SC (-)	0–4	Randwick City FC (-)
NSW	–	27	Young Lions SC (-)	4–1	Bankstown Sports Strikers FC (-)
NSW	–	28	West Pymble FC (-)	3–2	Kemps Creek United SC (-)
NSW	–	29	Banksia Tigers FC (-)	2–0	Balmain & District FC (-)
NSW	–	30	University of Wollongong (7)	1–3	West Pennant Hills Cherrybrook FC (-)
NSW	–	31	Thornleigh Thunder FC (-)	0–4	Killarney District (6)
NSW	–	32	Mosman FC (-)	4–0	Fairfield Bulls (6)
NSW	–	33	Brookvale FC (-)	3–0	North Sydney United FC (-)
NSW	–	34	Sydney Rangers FC (-)	0–3	Moorebank Sports SC (-)
NSW	–	35	Bass Hill Rangers FC (-)	3–5	Shoalhaven United FC (6)
NSW	–	36	St. Patricks FC (-)	3–3†	Sydney Coolong FC (-)
Sydney Coolong advance 5–4 on penalties.
NSW	–	37	Albion Park City Razorbacks FC (-)	4–0	Five Dock FC (-)
NSW	–	38	Waverley Old Boys (-)	4–1	Kenthurst & District FC (-)
NSW	–	39	Padstown Hornets FC (-)	3–2	Blacktown Workers FC (-)
Northern New South Wales
NNSW	NTH	40	The Armidale School (-)	0–3	Camden Haven Redbacks FC (-)
NNSW	NTH	41	Demon Knights FC (4)	w/o	Northern Storm Thunder FSC (4)
NNSW	NTH	42	Coffs Coast Tigers FC (4)	2–0	Kempsey Saints FC (4)
NNSW	NTH	43	Armidale City Westside FC (4)	w/o	Port Saints FC (4)
NNSW	NTH	44	Richmond Rovers FC (-)	9–0	Grafton United FC (-)
Queensland
QLD	FNQ	45	Atherton Eagles FC (-)	0–4	Douglas United (-)
QLD	CQ	46	Capricorn Coast (-)	1–2	Bluebirds United (-)
QLD	SEQ	47	Bethania Rams FC	3–4†	North Brisbane (6)
QLD	SEQ	48	Oxley United (6)	6–0	USQ FC (-)
QLD	SEQ	49	Grange Thistle (4)	1–0	Centenary Stormers (4)
QLD	SEQ	50	Runaway Bay (-)	6–1	Caboolture Sports FC (4)
QLD	SEQ	51	Western Spirit (5)	5–5†	Bardon Latrobe (6)
Western Spirit advance 7–6 on penalties.
QLD	SEQ	52	Annerley FC (5)	1–2	Ipswich City (5)

Fed	Zone	Tie no	Home team (Tier)	Score	Away team (Tier)
QLD	SEQ	53	Virginia United (5)	3–1	Rockville Rovers FC (4)
QLD	SEQ	54	Jimboomba United FC (7)	1–0	Tweed United (-)
QLD	SEQ	55	Tarragindi Tigers FC (6)	1–2	West Wanderers FC (4)
QLD	SEQ	56	Brighton Bulldogs (-)	3–0	Pacific Pines FC (-)
QLD	SEQ	57	Woombye FC (4)	6–2	Springfield United FC (7)
QLD	SEQ	58	Bribie FC (-)	0–12	Musgrave SC (-)
QLD	SEQ	59	Gympie United FC (4)	6–0	Tallebudgera Valley (-)
QLD	SEQ	60	Nambour Yandina United FC (4)	6–5	Brisbane Knights (4)
QLD	SEQ	61	Buderim Wanderers FC (4)	2–0	Park Ridge FC (6)
QLD	SEQ	62	Palm Beach Sharks (4)	4–0	Westside Grovely (6)
QLD	SEQ	63	Gatton SC (4)	0–3	Willowburn FC (4)
QLD	SEQ	64	Logan Metro FC (7)	3–2	Brisbane Athletic FC (6)
QLD	SEQ	65	Bayside United (4)	1–0	Albany Creek (4)
QLD	SEQ	66	Acacia Ridge (4)	1–3	North Star (5)
QLD	SEQ	67	Moggill FC (5)	0–2†	AC Carina FC (5)
QLD	SEQ	68	Ripley Valley FC (7)	1–3	Surfers Paradise Apollo (4)
QLD	SEQ	69	North Lakes Mustangs FC (7)	0–4	Beerwah Glasshouse United (4)
QLD	SEQ	70	Pine Hills (5)	3–0	Mt Gravatt Hawks (5)
QLD	SEQ	71	Clairvaux FC (6)	2–3†	UQFC (4)
QLD	SEQ	72	Noosa Lions FC (4)	2–3†	Coomera Colts (4)
Victoria
VIC	–	73	Melbourne City (8)	4–5	Plenty Valley Lions (8)
VIC	–	74	Melbourne University (8)	3–2	Mount Lilydale Old Collegians (9)
VIC	–	75	Fawkner (7)	4–1	Sandown Lions (8)
VIC	–	76	Seaford United (8)	2–2†	Brunswick Zebras (8)
Seaford United advance 7–6 on penalties.
VIC	–	77	Frankston Pines (7)	2–4	Barwon (9)
VIC	–	78	Chelsea FC (8)	1–5	Mount Waverley City (9)
VIC	–	79	Upfield (7)	2–0	Bayside Argonauts (7)
VIC	–	80	Chisholm United (8)	2–1	Yarra Jets (9)
VIC	–	81	Sebastopol Vikings (7)	7–0	North Melbourne Athletic (8)
VIC	–	82	South Yarra (7)	8–1	Croydon City Arrows (8)
VIC	–	83	Sandringham (8)	2–0	Glenroy Lions (9)
VIC	–	84	Westvale SC (7)	w/o	Western Eagles (7)
VIC	–	85	Darebin United (8)	0–2	Greenvale United (8)
VIC	–	86	Surf Coast (8)	3–0	Dandenong South (8)
VIC	–	87	Endeavour United (8)	0–3	West Preston (8)
VIC	–	88	Ringwood City (8)	0–1	Westside Strikers (8)
VIC	–	89	La Trobe University (8)	1–1†	Ashburton United SC (7)
La Trobe University advance 5–4 on penalties.
VIC	–	90	Williamstown SC (7)	3–0	Uni Hill Eagles (8)
VIC	–	91	Lyndale United (8)	2–3	Monash University (7)
VIC	–	92	Tatura Soccer Club (10)	4–5	East Brighton United (7)
VIC	–	93	Point Cook (7)	1–0†	Elwood City (7)
VIC	–	94	Rowville Eagles (7)	4–1	Craigieburn City (7)
VIC	–	95	Heidelberg Eagles (7)	2–0	Whitehorse United (7)
VIC	–	96	East Bentleigh Strikers (8)	w/o	Shepparton South SC (10)
VIC	–	97	Watsonia Heights (8)	1–3	Northern Falcons (8)
VIC	–	98	Sunbury United (7)	2–0	Altona North (7)
VIC	–	99	Middle Park (7)	4–3	Dingley Stars (8)
VIC	–	100	Diamond Valley United (7)	2–0	Brighton (7)
VIC	–	101	Old Camberwell Grammarians (8)	1–2	Bunyip District (9)
VIC	–	102	Barnstoneworth United Senior FC (8)	5–2	Essendon United (7)
Western Australia
WA	–	103	Perth Hills FC (-)	3–0	La Fiamma Sporting Club (-)
WA	–	104	Queens Park SC (-)	2–0	Busselton City FC (-)
WA	–	105	Ellenbrook United FC (-)	2–3	Jaguar FC (-)
WA	–	106	Joondanna Blues FC (-)	2–1	Perth AFC (-)
WA	–	107	BrOzzy Sports Club (-)	1–8	Maddington White City FC (-)
WA	–	198	Woodvale FC (-)	2–1	Alexander Florina FC (-)

Notes

- † = After Extra Time
- NSW Byes – Broulee Stingrays FC (-), Bulli FC (-), Castle Hill United FC (-), Central Coast Wolves FC (-), Coniston FC (-), Gunners FC (-), Marayong FC (-), Redbacks FC (-), Springwood United FC (-).
- NNSW Byes – Bellingen FC (-), Boambee Bombers FC (4), Coffs City United FC (4), Dudley Redhead United Senior FC (4), Dudley Redhead United FC (4), Kotara South FC (4), Macleay Valley Rangers FC (4), Mayfield United Senior FC (-), Moree Services FC (5), North United Wolves SC (-), Oxley Vale Attunga FC (4), Port United SC (4), Sawtell FC (-), Wallis Lakes-Great Lakes United (-), Westlawn Tigers FC (4), Woolgoolga Wolves (4).
- QLD Byes – Across The Waves (-), Broadbeach United (4), Burleigh Heads Bulldogs (4), Caloundra FC (4), Clinton FC (-), CQU Berserker Bears (-), Frenchville FC (-), Kangaroo Point Rovers (6), Kawana (4), KSS Jets FC (-), Logan Village FC (7), Maroochydore FC (4), Narangba (-), Nerang FC (4), New Farm United FC (5), Newmarket (6), North Pine (4), Redcliffe PCYC FC (7), Robina City (5), Samford Rangers FC (5), Slacks Creek (6), Southport (4), St. George Willawong FC (5), Taringa Rovers (4), Teviot Downs SC (7), The Gap (4), The Lakes FC (6), Toowong (4).

== Third round ==
In the ACT and South Australia, a draw was conducted but no matches were played.

Fed	Zone	Tie no	Home team (Tier)	Score	Away team (Tier)
Northern New South Wales
NNSW	NTH	1	Westlawn Tigers FC (4)	3–5	Macleay Valley Rangers FC (4)
NNSW	NTH	2	Boambee Bombers FC (4)	4–2	Wallis Lakes-Great Lakes United (-)
NNSW	NTH	3	Camden Haven Redbacks FC (-)	w/o	Moree Services FC (5)
NNSW	NTH	4	Port United SC (4)	0–0†	Coffs Coast Tigers FC (4)
Coffs Coast Tigers advance 3–1 on penalties.
NNSW	NTH	5	Sawtell FC (-)	3–7	Lismore Richmond Rovers FC (-)
NNSW	NTH	6	Bellingen FC (-)	0–1	Northern Storm Thunder FSC (4)
NNSW	NTH	7	Coffs City United FC (4)	2–2†	Port Saints FC (4)
Port Saints advance 4–3 on penalties.
NNSW	NTH	8	Woolgoolga Wolves (4)	2–6	Oxley Vale Attunga FC (4)
Queensland
QLD	FNQ	9	Innisfail United (-)	2–1	Douglas United (-)
QLD	FNQ	10	Stratford Dolphins (-)	4–0	Leichhardt FC (-)
QLD	FNQ	11	Edge Hill United (-)	6–2	Mareeba United (-)
QLD	FNQ	12	Southside Comets (-)	3–2	Marlin Coast Rangers (-)
QLD	NQ	13	Wulguru United FC (-)	1–3	Burdekin (-)
QLD	NQ	14	Rebels FC (-)	0–2	Brothers Townsville (-)
QLD	NQ	15	Townsville Warriors (-)	2–3	Saints Eagles Souths FC (-)
QLD	CQ	16	CQU Berserker Bears (-)	0–6	Clinton FC (-)
QLD	MR	17	Whitsunday United FC (-)	0–5	Mackay Wanderers (-)
QLD	MR	18	Mackay Rangers FC (-)	1–6	Mackay Lions (-)
QLD	MR	19	Magpies FC (-)	4–1	City Brothers FC (-)
QLD	SEQ	20	The Gap (4)	1–3	Woombye FC (4)
QLD	SEQ	21	Willowburn FC (4)	1–0	Kangaroo Point Rovers (6)
QLD	SEQ	22	Western Spirit (5)	0–3	Burleigh Heads Bulldogs (4)
QLD	SEQ	23	Virginia United (5)	2–0	Caloundra FC (4)
QLD	SEQ	24	Pine Hills (5)	0–1	Coomera Colts (4)
QLD	SEQ	25	Samford Rangers FC (5)	3–1	Taringa Rovers (4)
QLD	SEQ	26	Oxley United (6)	8–1	Teviot Downs SC (7)
QLD	SEQ	27	Brighton Bulldogs (-)	0–4	Redcliffe PCYC FC (7)
QLD	SEQ	28	Slacks Creek (6)	2–2†	Nerang FC (4)
Nerang FC advance 5–3 on penalties.
QLD	SEQ	29	Logan Village FC (7)	0–2	North Brisbane (6)
QLD	SEQ	30	Gympie United FC (4)	4–7	Palm Beach Sharks (4)
QLD	SEQ	31	Buderim Wanderers FC (4)	1–4	Robina City (5)
QLD	SEQ	32	Kawana (4)	1–2	AC Carina FC (5)
QLD	SEQ	33	Southport (5)	1–2	Kingscliff District FC (-)
QLD	SEQ	34	Maroochydore FC (4)	6–2	UQFC (4)
QLD	SEQ	35	Grange Thistle (4)	5–0	North Pine (4)
QLD	SEQ	36	Surfers Paradise Apollo (4)	6–0	New Farm United FC (5)
QLD	SEQ	37	Broadbeach United (4)	2–1†	North Star (5)
QLD	SEQ	38	Newmarket (6)	0–2	St. George Willawong FC (5)
QLD	SEQ	39	Ipswich City (5)	3–2	Nambour Yandina United FC (4)
QLD	SEQ	40	Beerwah Glasshouse United (4)	2–1	Bayside United (4)
QLD	SEQ	41	Narangba (-)	6–0	West Wanderers FC (4)
QLD	SEQ	42	Musgrave SC (-)	1–3	The Lakes FC (6)
QLD	SEQ	43	Logan Metro FC (7)	9–2	Jimboomba United FC (7)
QLD	SEQ	44	Runaway Bay (-)	0–3	Toowong (4)

Fed	Zone	Tie no	Home team (Tier)	Score	Away team (Tier)
Tasmania
TAS	–	45	Northern Rangers (3)	1–0	Ulverstone (3)
TAS	–	46	South East United (3)	0–8	Hobart United (3)
Victoria
VIC	–	47	Peninsula Strikers Senior FC (6)	1–4	Keilor Park (5)
VIC	–	48	Rowville Eagles SC (7)	0–7	Brimbank Stallions (5)
VIC	–	49	Hume United FC (6)	1–0	St Kilda (5)
VIC	–	50	Warragul United (5)	1–3	Langwarrin (3)
VIC	–	51	FC Strathmore (-)	7–2	Middle Park FC (7)
VIC	–	52	Northern Falcons (8)	0–1	West Preston SC (8)
VIC	–	53	North Sunshine Eagles (4)	6–0	Knox City FC (6)
VIC	–	54	Yarraville (5)	2–0	Sunbury United FC (7)
VIC	–	55	Upfield SC (7)	0–2	Seaford United SC (8)
VIC	–	56	Bulleen Lions (3)	3–1	Springvale White Eagles (4)
VIC	–	57	Beaumaris SC (5)	1–0	Albion Rovers (6)
VIC	–	58	Geelong (4)	6–1	Monash University (7)
VIC	–	59	Werribee City (3)	11–0	Western Suburbs (6)
VIC	–	60	Sydenham Park SC (5)	2–0	Williamstown SC (7)
VIC	–	61	Whittlesea Ranges (4)	2–4	Nunawading City (4)
VIC	–	62	Caroline Springs George Cross FC (5)	1–3	Box Hill United (4)
VIC	–	63	Heatherton United SC (6)	6–0	Barnstoneworth United Senior FC (8)
VIC	–	64	Mount Waverley City SC (9)	0–10	Malvern City (5)
VIC	–	65	Pascoe Vale (3)	5–0	Casey Comets FC (5)
VIC	–	66	La Trobe University (8)	2–5	Brunswick City (3)
VIC	–	67	Monbulk Rangers SC (6)	4–1	Mooroolbark (6)
VIC	–	68	Mornington SC (5)	2–1	Altona East Phoenix (6)
VIC	–	69	Altona City (5)	3–0	Doncaster Rovers (6)
VIC	–	70	Mazenod FC (5)	3–0	Geelong Rangers (6)
VIC	–	71	Moreland Zebras Juventus (3)	2–0	North Geelong Warriors (3)
VIC	–	72	Boroondara-Carey Eagles (5)	5–2	Plenty Valley Lions (8)
VIC	–	73	Eltham Redbacks FC (5)	1–2	Doveton SC (4)
VIC	–	74	Melbourne University (8)	0–3	Brandon Park SC (6)
VIC	–	75	South Yarra SC (7)	0–3	Caufield-Bentleigh United Cobras FC (5)
VIC	–	76	Westside Strikers FC (8)	2–0	Clifton Hill (5)
VIC	–	77	Goulburn Valley Suns (3)	4–0	Corio SC (5)
VIC	–	78	Richmond FC (5)	2–1	Collingwood City FC (-)
VIC	–	79	South Springvale (5)	4–6†	Northcote City (3)
VIC	–	80	Epping City SC (6)	2–3†	Lalor United FC (-)
VIC	–	81	Manningham United Blues (3)	8–0	Greenvale United SC (8)
VIC	–	82	East Brighton United FC (7)	0–1	Sebastopol Vikings SC (7)
VIC	–	83	Moreland City (3)	6–0	Western Eagles (7)
VIC	–	84	Berwick City SC (6)	6–0	Moreland United SC (6)
VIC	–	85	North Caulfield Senior FC (6)	2–1	Westgate (6)
VIC	–	86	Hoppers Crossing (6)	0–3	Whittlesea United SC (5)
VIC	–	87	Fitzroy City (5)	1–6	Brighton (7)
VIC	–	88	Sandringham SC (8)	1–3	Barwon SC (9)
VIC	–	89	Mill Park SC (6)	1–0	Shepparton South SC (10)
VIC	–	90	Preston Lions (4)	6–0	Heidelberg Eagles SC (7)
VIC	–	91	Skye United FC (-)	1–2	Fawkner (7)

Notes

- w/o = Walkover
- † = After Extra Time
- NNSW Byes – Singleton Strikers FC (3).
- QLD Byes – MA Olympic FC (-).
- TAS Byes – Beachside (3), Launceston United (3), Metro FC (3), Somerset (3), Taroona (3), University of Tasmania (3).
- VIC Byes – Surf Coast (8).

== Fourth round ==
In Tasmania, the Lakoseljac Cup recommenced in July, after the cancellation of the overall FFA Cup competition. In the Northern Territory a draw was made, but no matches were played.

Fed.	Zone	Tie no	Home team (Tier)	Score	Away team (Tier)
Northern New South Wales
NNSW	NTH	9	Oxley Vale Attunga FC (4)	1–4	Port United SC (4)
NNSW	NTH	10	Boambee Bombers FC (4)	3–1	Port Saints FC (4)
NNSW	NTH	11	Camden Haven Redbacks FC (-)	0–4	Northern Storm Thunder FSC (4)
NNSW	NTH	12	Lismore Richmond Rovers FC (-)	3–0	Macleay Valley Rangers FC (4)
Queensland
QLD	FNQ	17	Stratford Dolphins (-)	1–3	Southside Comets (-)
QLD	NQ	18	Burdekin (-)	1–3	Saints Eagles Souths FC (-)
QLD	NQ	19	MA Olympic FC (-)	0–1	Brothers Townsville (-)

Fed	Zone	Tie no	Home team (Tier)	Score	Away team (Tier)
Tasmania
TAS	–	20	Launceston United (3)	2–4	South Hobart (2)
TAS	–	21	Launceston City (2)	2–1	Devonport City (2)
TAS	–	22	University of Tasmania (3)	4–0	Riverside Olympic (2)
TAS	–	23	Kingborough Lions United (2)	5–1	Clarence Zebras (2)
TAS	–	24	Somerset (3)	1–4	Hobart United (3)
TAS	–	25	Olympia (2)	10–1	Beachside (3)
TAS	–	26	Glenorchy Knights (2)	5–0	Northern Rangers (3)
TAS	–	27	Metro FC (3)	1–8	Taroona (3)

== Fifth and subsequent rounds ==
The Lakoseljac Cup competition continued in Tasmania, which was the only member federation still running a cup competition that had been part of the FFA Cup preliminary rounds. The match between South Hobart and Kingborough Lions United (originally won 3–2 by South Hobart) had to be replayed after an administrative team-sheet breach.

Fed	Zone	Tie no	Home team (Tier)	Score	Away team (Tier)
Tasmania
TAS	–	1	Hobart United (3)	0–2	Launceston City (2)
TAS	–	2	Taroona (3)	0–3	Glenorchy Knights (2)
TAS	–	3	Olympia (2)	2–0	University of Tasmania (3)
TAS	–	4	South Hobart (2)	5–2	Kingborough Lions United (2)

=== Sixth round ===
Fed	Zone	Tie no	Home team (Tier)	Score	Away team (Tier)
Tasmania
TAS	–	1	Olympia (2)	7–0	Launceston City (2)
TAS	–	2	Glenorchy Knights (2)	3–2	South Hobart (2)

=== Seventh round ===
The only match played in this round was the Grand Final of the Lakoseljac Cup competition in Tasmania.

Fed	Zone	Tie no	Home team (Tier)	Score	Away team (Tier)
Tasmania
TAS	–	1	Olympia (2)	1–2	Glenorchy Knights (2)
