= Geelong Community Cup =

Annual soccer tournament in Geelong, Australia

- Organiser(s): Geelong Regional Football Committee
- Founded: 1981; 45 years ago
- Region: Victoria
- Most championships: North Geelong Warriors
- Website: Football Geelong

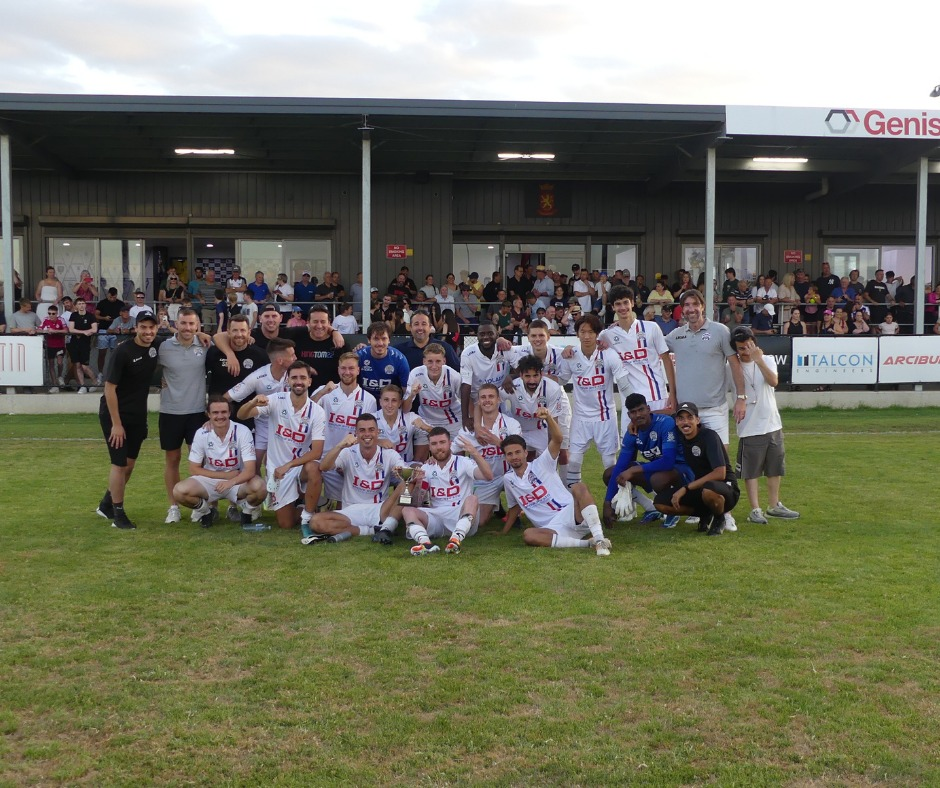
Geelong Pre-Season Cup 2024

The Geelong Community Cup is an annual pre-season soccer tournament held in Geelong for men and women.

The Cup was established in 1981 by the Geelong Advertiser newspaper led by soccer writer Bill Walsh, Bob Kocsiki, Billy Dorris and Jim Lippelgoes. The cup is one of the longest continuously run cup competitions in Victoria.

It has been known as the Geelong Advertiser Cup (1981–2005), the Geelong Community Shield, the Diversity Cup, Century 21 Cup, Go-for-your-Life Cup, Morris Finance Cup and is now named the Geelong Community Cup.

In 1988, Bobby Charlton kicked-off the semi-final at Bell Park Sports Club.

== Men's Cup winners ==
Year	Winners	Runner-up	Result	Venue
1981	Bell Park SC	Hamlyn Rangers	1–0	Bell Park Sports Club
1982	Corio	Geelong United	3–2	Myers Reserve
1983	Geelong SC	West Geelong	5–1	Stead Park
1984	West Geelong	Geelong SC	2–1	Myers Reserve
1985	North Geelong Warriors	Geelong United	2–1	Hume Reserve
1986	North Geelong Warriors	Geelong SC	2–0	Elcho Park
1987	Hamlyn Rangers	East Geelong	1–0	Hume Reserve
1988	Bell Park SC	North Geelong Warriors	6–4	Bell Park Sports Club
1989	North Geelong Warriors	Corio-Geelong United	2–0	Myers Reserve
1990	Geelong SC (won on penalties)	North Geelong Warriors	2–2	Stead Park
1991	North Geelong Warriors	Corio-Geelong United	3–1	Myers Reserve
1992	North Geelong Warriors	Geelong SC	6–1	Bell Park Sports Club
1993	North Geelong Warriors	Bell Park SC	1–0	Elcho Park
1994	North Geelong Warriors	Geelong SC	4–1	Elcho Park
1995	North Geelong Warriors	Geelong Rangers:	6–2	Myers Reserve
1996	North Geelong Warriors	Geelong SC	8–1	Stead Park
1997	North Geelong Warriors	Geelong SC	3–2	Stead Park
1998	Corio SC (won on penalties)	North Geelong Warriors	2–2	Stead Park
1999	Geelong SC	Corio SC	3–2	Stead Park
2000	Geelong SC (won on penalties)	North Geelong Warriors	1–1	Stead Park
2001	North Geelong Warriors	Corio SC	2–1	Bell Park Sports Club
2002	Geelong SC	North Geelong Warriors	2–1	Myers Reserve
2003	North Geelong Warriors	Hopper Crossing	3–2 (Golden goal in extra time)	Elcho Park
2004	North Geelong Warriors	Geelong Rangers	2–1 (Golden goal in extra time)	Hume Reserve
2005	North Geelong Warriors	Geelong SC	4–0	Elcho Park
2006	North Geelong Warriors	Geelong Rangers	5–1	Stead Park
2007	North Geelong Warriors	Geelong Rangers	2–0	Elcho Park
2008	Geelong SC	Hopper Crossing	3–1	Bell Park Sports Club
2009	Geelong Rangers	Surf Coast FC	1–0	Myers Reserve
2010	Corio	Surf Coast	1–0	Hume Reserve
2011	North Geelong Warriors	Geelong SC	4–0	Stead Park
2012	North Geelong Warriors	Corio SC	8–1	Bell Park Sports Club
2013	North Geelong Warriors	Corio	2–0	Myers Reserve
2014	North Geelong Warriors (won on penalties)	Corio SC	1–1	Elcho Park
2015	Geelong SC	Corio SC	1–1 (4–3 on penalties)	Hume Reserve
2016	Bell Park SC	Corio SC	2–1	Bell Park Sports Club
2017	Corio SC	Golden Plains Eagles	2–0	Hume Reserve
2018	Geelong SC	Geelong Rangers	4–2	Stead Park
2019	Geelong Rangers	Geelong SC	1–0	Myers Reserve
2020	Geelong SC	Corio SC	6–1	Stead Park
2021	Corio SC	North Geelong Warriors	1–1 (5–4 on penalties)	Hume Reserve
2022	North Geelong Warriors	Geelong SC	2–1	Myers Reserve
2023	North Geelong Warriors	Corio SC	2–0	Bell Park Sports Club
2024	North Geelong Warriors	Geelong SC	1–1 (5–4 on penalties)	Stead Park
2025	Surf Coast	North Geelong Warriors Youth	5–2	Hume Reserve
2026	Cup cancelled - Extreme heat			

== Women's Cup winners ==
The women's cup competition was introduced in 2020.

Year	Winner	Runner-up	Result	Venue
2020	Geelong Galaxy	North Geelong Warriors	5–1	Stead Park
2024	Geelong Galaxy	North Geelong Warriors	1–0	Stead Park
2025	North Geelong Warriors	Geelong Galaxy	2–1	Hume Reserve
2026	Cup cancelled - Extreme heat			

== Tournament wins ==
=== Men ===
- North Geelong Warriors, 23 titles
- Geelong SC, 9 titles
- Corio Soccer Club, 5 titles
- Bell Park Sports Club, 3 titles
- Geelong Rangers FC, 3 titles
- West Geelong, 1 title
- Surf Coast FC, 1 title

==== Women ====
- Geelong Galaxy, 2 titles
- North Geelong Warriors, 1 title

== Notable Cup participants ==
- David Cervinski
- Frank Munro
- Joey Didulica
- Josip Skoko
- Kris Trajanovski
- Noah Skoko
- Steve Horvat
- Sergio Escudero
- Tommy Cumming

== See also ==
- Geelong Regional Football Committee
- Soccer in Geelong
