= Football Victoria Geelong =

- Abbreviation: FV Geelong
- Formation: (1926; 100 years ago as Geelong and Western District Soccer Association)
- Type: Regional Sporting Association
- Legal status: Active
- Location: Geelong
- Region served: Geelong, Australia
- Parent organisation: Football Victoria / Football Australia
- Website: https://footballgeelong.com/

Football Victoria Geelong is a Regional Advisory Panel of Football Victoria serving in the Geelong region of Victoria.

It was previously known as the Western Victoria Soccer Association, and later the Geelong Region Football Association (GRFA). In 2010, GRFA member clubs voted to hand control of local league administration to the state's governing body Football Victoria. The vote passed with 20 votes from 26 representatives.

== Local leagues ==
Football Victoria Geelong organises local Geelong community competitions:

- Men's and women's senior and reserve teams.
- Junior divisions from ages U13 to U18.
- MiniRoos and MiniTillies from ages U7 to U11 years.

== Current clubs ==
Clubs playing in Geelong, state and VPL competitions from the region

Clubs	Est.	Home ground/Stadium
Armstrong United FC	2018	Armstrong Creek Sporting Oval
Barwon Heads Soccer Club	2008	Barwon Heads Community Park
Barwon Soccer Club	1992	Grovedale Reserve
Bell Park Sport Club	1959	Bell Park Sports Club, Batesford
Bellarine Sharks AFC	2004	St Leonards Lake Reserve
Geelong City Football Club (Formerly Breakwater Eagles)	1964	Howard Glover Reserve, East Geelong
Colac Otway Rovers AFC	2010	Beeac Recreation Reserve
Corio Bay Sports Club	1986	Evans Reserve, Norlane
Corio Soccer Club	1955	Hume Reserve, Bell Park
Deakin Ducks FC	1978	Deakin University Sports Precinct, Waurn Ponds
Drysdale Soccer Club	2009	Drysdale Recreation Reserve
FC Leopold	2016	Estuary Boulevard Recreation Reserve, Leopold
Geelong Galaxy United FC	2016	Hume Reserve, Bell Park
Geelong Rangers	1955	Myers Reserve, Bell Post Hill
Geelong SC	1958	Stead Park, Norlane
Golden Plains Soccer Club	2012	Bannockburn Recreation Precinct
Lara United	1999	Lara Recreation Reserve
North Geelong Warriors	1967	Elcho Park, Lara
Ocean Grove SC	1996	Shell Road Reserve, Ocean Grove
Surfcoast FC	2001	Banyul-warri Fields, Torquay

=== Men's team ranking ===
As of 2026

Team	Division
North Geelong Warriors FC	Victoria Premier League 1
Geelong SC	Victoria Premier League 2
Surf Coast	Victorian State League Division 2 North-West
Corio Soccer Club	Victorian State League Division 3 North-West
Geelong Rangers	Victorian State League Division 3 North-West
Bell Park Sports Club	Victorian State League Division 3 North West
Lara United FC	Victorian State League Division 5 North west
Deakin Ducks Football Club	Victorian State League Division 5 North West
Ocean Grove Soccer Club	Victorian State League Division 6 North West
Barwon Soccer Club	Victorian State League Division 6 North West
Geelong City Football Club	Geelong Division 1
Golden Plains Soccer Club	Geelong Division 1
Armstrong Creek United	Geelong Division 1
Drysdale S.C	Geelong Division 2
Barwon Heads F.C.	Geelong Division 1
FC Leopold	Geelong Division 2
Bellarine Sharks	Geelong Division 2
Corio Bay F.C.	Geelong Division 2
Colac Otway Rovers F.C.	Geelong Division 3

== Representative squads ==
GRFC's representative squads compete in the Annual tournament of the Country Championships, an annual Junior tournament established in 1978 by the Country Leagues Football Association (CLFA).

It attracts both male and female regional representative players aged 11 years to 17 years old, coaches, officials and spectators over 3 days of competition, to determine and crown State Champions.

The event takes place each year in June on the King's Birthday long weekend. Each year Geelong competes against teams from all over Regional Victoria including Bendigo, Shepparton, Moama-Echuca, Albury/Wodonga, Gippsland, Goulburn, Latrobe Valley, Swan Hill, South West Victoria and Sunraysia.

== Cup competition ==
The Geelong Community Cup is an annual pre-season soccer tournament held in the region since 1981.

== Notable players ==
The following players have played football for GRFC clubs and have represented senior men's or women's national teams.

- (Australia) Adrian Leijer - Geelong SC player and Surf Coast FC coach
- (Australia) Francis Awaritefe - North Geelong Croatia (North Geelong Warriors)
- (Scotland) Frank Munro - Hamlyn Park Rangers (Geelong Rangers)
- (Croatia) Joey Didulica - North Geelong Warriors
- (Australia) Josip Skoko - North Geelong Warriors
- (Australia) Kris Trajanovski - West Geelong SC (Geelong SC)
- (Australia) Matthew Spiranovic - North Geelong Warriors
- (Australia) Steve Horvat - North Geelong Croatia (North Geelong Warriors)
- (Papua New Guinea) Raymond Diho - North Geelong Warriors 2022 - 2025
- (Scotland) (Australia) Tommy Cumming - Player then coach at Bell Park 1988-1994

== Life members ==
Life members of either Geelong Region Football Association, Western Victoria Soccer Association, Football Federation Victoria that have served primarily in the region.

- Joe Cappadona
- Tony Curnick
- Mujo Dzin
- Cecil Earley
- Paul Halliday
- Joe Jakubowski
- John Karounos
- John Kubina
- Everett Nelson
- Alex Stojanovski

== Football Australia Hall of Fame ==
National Hall of Fame inductees that have served or played in the region.

- Roy Hay (inducted 2025) - Author and noted sports writer.
- Branko Culina (inducted 2019) - 1992 Victorian Premier League winning coach with North Geelong Warriors.
- Eddie Krncevic (inducted 2000) - 2007 coach with North Geelong Warriors.
- Steve Horvat (inducted 2000) - North Geelong Warriors player from 1991 to 1994.
- Jimmy Rooney (inducted 1999) - Player Hamlyn Park Rangers 1983 - 84

== History ==
Read a history of Soccer in Geelong.

== Former teams ==
Teams	Years active (if known)
Brintons SC	1964-1991. Became Eastern Park in 1991.
British	1956
Bellarine United	1985
Bacchus Marsh	1995
Barwon City	
Belmont	1967
Croatia	1954
Corio Cloverdale	
DSG (Dutch Society Geelong)	1956
East Geelong FC	1985-93 (Merged with Geelong).
Elcho Park Cardinals	
Geelong Espanol	
Geelong City	1914
Geelong Celtic FC	1950-1951
Geelong Scottish	1955. Became Hamlyn Rangers
Geelong Olympic Sports Club	1984-
Geelong United	1923-31, 1934 - 1936
Geelong United	1951
Geelong United FC	1977 - 1987 (Merged with Corio SC)
H.M.A.S. Brisbane	
Ford Recreation	
International Harvester FC	1950 -1953
Industrial Service Engineers Pty Ltd FC	
IAMA club (Italian Australian Migrants Association)	1955
Kardinia International College	
Lovely Banks Kiev	1987
Northern Suburbs	1979
Norlane Olympia	1955
Norlane Juliana	
Macedonia	1959
Shell	1953
Toldi	
Union Jack
Ukrania	1958
Queenscliff Garrison	
West Geelong	1965-1984. Became East Geelong
Zagreb	1958-1960

== See also ==
- Australian football (soccer) league system
- Geelong Community Cup
