= Nicholas Kozdra =

Australian association football player

Personal information
- Full name: Nicholas Kozdra
- Date of birth: 26 November 1996 (age 29)
- Place of birth: Melbourne, Australia
- Position: Midfielder

Youth career
- Port Melbourne
- 2015: Green Gully

Senior career*
Years	Team	Apps	(Gls)
2015	Green Gully		
2016	Stal Stalowa Wola II		
2016–2017	Stal Stalowa Wola	2	(0)
2017	Golden Plains	4	(1)
2018	Geelong Rangers	14	(0)
2019–2023	North Geelong Warriors	60	(2)
2023–	Geelong Rangers		
- * Club domestic league appearances and goals as of 10 October 2023

Nicholas Kozdra (born 26 November 1996) is an Australian–Polish professional soccer player who plays as a defender for Geelong Rangers.

== Career ==
In 2015, he played for Australian club Green Gully.

On 15 July 2016, Kozdra was registered to play for Polish II liga club Stal Stalowa Wola. Just one day later, he made his debut appearance in a 4–0 Polish Cup defeat against Radomiak Radom. His contract was terminated after the 2016–17 season.
