= Raymond Diho =

Papua New Guinean soccer player

Personal information
- Date of birth: 13 October 2006 (age 20)
- Place of birth: Port Moresby, Papua New Guinea
- Height: 1.74 m (5 ft 9 in)
- Position: Defender

Team information
- Current team: Vanuatu United
- Number: 15

Youth career
- –2024: North Geelong Warriors

Senior career*
Years	Team	Apps	(Gls)
2024–2025	North Geelong Warriors	20	(0)
2025	Melbourne Victory NPL	6	(0)
2026	Vanuatu United	17	(1)
2026–	Peninsula Power	0	(0)

International career^{‡}
2024–	Papua New Guinea	3	(0)
- * Club domestic league appearances and goals as of 14:14, 1 July 2026 (UTC) ‡ National team caps and goals as of 14:14, 10 February 2026 (UTC)

Raymond Diho (born 25 June 2006) is a Papua New Guinean footballer who currently plays for OFC Professional League club Vanuatu United FC, and the Papua New Guinea national team.

== Club career ==
Diho began his career at age eight with Melbourne-based club West Point SC. He later joined North Geelong Warriors. In 2023, he was named the Player of the Season for the club's under-21 side. The next year, he joined the Warriors' senior side and made twenty appearances in the NPL Victoria during the 2024 season.

In 2025, Diho joined the academy of A-League club Melbourne Victory. He made his senior debut for the Melbourne Victory Academy in the NPL Victoria during the early stages of the 2025 season.

In November 2025, it was announced that Diho had signed his first professional contract with Vanuatu United FC of the OFC Professional League for the competition's inaugural season. Diho was connected with Vanuatu United through a former coach who was now working at the club. At age nineteen, he was one of the youngest players in the league at the time. He made his professional debut with the club as a starter against Bula FC at Eden Park in New Zealand on 17 January 2026 in the clubs' and league's first-ever match.

== International career ==
In June 2024, Diho was called up to the Papua New Guinea national team for the first time for the 2024 OFC Men's Nations Cup to be played in Fiji. He made his senior debut for Papua New Guinea in the team's opening match of the Group Stage, an eventual 1–5 loss to the hosts on 16 June 2024 at age seventeen.

== Career statistics ==
=== International ===
As of match played 22 June 2024

Papua New Guinea
Year	Apps	Goals
2024	3	0
Total	3	0

== Personal life ==
Diho was born and raised in the Gabi village of Port Moresby, Papua New Guinea to a Papua New Guinean mother and Australian father. At age seven, he and his family moved to Australia. Diho is the oldest of three sons. He returned to PNG first the first time in twelve years when he competed with Vanuatu United during an OFC Professional League match played at the PNG Football Stadium in February 2026.
