= Deakin Ducks Football Club =

Deakin Ducks
- Full name: Deakin Ducks Football Club
- Founded: 1978
- Ground: Deakin University Elite Sports Precinct
- League: Victorian State League
- Website: https://deakinducks.com.au/
| Home colours | Away colours |

Deakin Ducks Football Club is an Australian amateur soccer club based in the Victorian city of Geelong.

The club has senior teams across Men's State League 5 West competition and local men's and women's teams in various divisions of the Geelong football league.

== History ==
The club was founded in 1978 a year after Deakin University opened its first campus.

In 2017 the Ducks men's team was promoted to State League 5 from Geelong Division 1 after success in the local Geelong competition.

In 2020 the club struggled to field teams when student numbers dwindle due to the COVID-19 global pandemic.

In 2024 the men's senior team won promotion to State League 4 for the 2025 season.

== Facilities ==
The Ducks play at the $8.1 million Elite Sports Precinct established in 2016 that features a synthetic pitch at the university's Waurn Ponds campus. In 2017 The Chinese women's national football team was based at the universities Elite Sports Precinct ahead of their clash with the Matildas.

== Honours ==
Women

- 2023 Geelong division 1 champions
- 2024 Geelong division 1 champions

Men

- 2016 Geelong division 1 champions
- 2024 Geelong division 2 champions
- 2024 Geelong division 3 champions

== Recent Seasons ==
Key

| Winners | Runners-up | Promoted | Relegated |

Results of league and cup competitions by season
| Season | League | | | | | | | | | | League Finals | Dockerty Cup | Top goalscorer(s) (Note: Goals in League Matches) | |
| Season | Division | Tier | Pld | W | D | L | GF | GA | Pts | Pos | League Finals | Dockerty Cup | Player(s) | Goals |
|---|---|---|---|---|---|---|---|---|---|---|---|---|---|---|
| 2012 | Geelong Division 2 ↑ | 7 | 18 | 12 | 3 | 3 | 56 | 27 | 39 | 2nd | Semi-Finals | - | Jim Koldas | 19 |
| 2013 | Geelong Division 1 | 8 | 18 | 10 | 1 | 7 | 53 | 33 | 31 | 4th | Runners-Up | - | Colby Hart | 15 |
| 2014 | Geelong Division 1 | 9 | 16 | 9 | 2 | 5 | 47 | 27 | 29 | 2nd | Winners | - | Christopher De Hoog | 9 |
| 2015 | Geelong Division 1 | 9 | 16 | 8 | 2 | 6 | 36 | 19 | 26 | 5th | Did not qualify | - | Troy Harrison | 4 |
| 2016 | Geelong Division 1 ↑ | 9 | 13 | 12 | 1 | 0 | 72 | 9 | 37 | 1st | Winners | - | Harry Woolley | 31 |
| 2017 | Victorian State League Division 5 West | 8 | 22 | 13 | 6 | 3 | 59 | 27 | 45 | 4th | Did not qualify | Second qualifying round | Jack Van Wren | 11 |
| 2018 | Victorian State League Division 5 West | 8 | 19 | 10 | 3 | 6 | 55 | 35 | 33 | 6th | Did not qualify | Qualifying round | Harry Woolley | 16 |
| 2019 | Victorian State League Division 5 West | 8 | 22 | 9 | 5 | 8 | 43 | 37 | 32 | 8th | Did not qualify | Second qualifying round | Marcus Lindeberg | 13 |
| 2020 | Victorian State League Division 5 West | 9 | Season not contested due to COVID-19 pandemic in Victoria | | | | | | | | | First round | - | |
| 2021 | Victorian State League Division 5 West | 9 | Season cancelled due to COVID-19 pandemic in Victoria | | | | | | | | | Third round | - | |
| 2022 | Victorian State League Division 5 West | 9 | 22 | 12 | 0 | 10 | 40 | 39 | 36 | 5th | Did not qualify | First round | James Robinson | 10 |
| 2023 | Victorian State League Division 5 West | 9 | 20 | 7 | 1 | 12 | 43 | 37 | 22 | 7th | Did not qualify | First round | James Robinson | 12 |
| 2024 | Victorian State League Division 5 West ↑ | 9 | 20 | 14 | 3 | 3 | 60 | 22 | 45 | 2nd | Did not qualify | Second round | Sam Wyeth | 21 |
| 2025 | Victorian State League Division 4 West | 8 | Season in progress | | | | | | | | | Second round | - | - |

== See also ==
- Geelong Regional Football Committee
- Soccer in Geelong
