= Northern Falcons FC =

- Full name: Northern Falcons Football Club
- Nickname: Falcons
- Short name: NFFC
- Founded: 1986; 40 years ago as 'Flemington Floridia SC'
- Ground: Hayes Park
- Chairman: Joe Pizzo
- Technical Coaching Director: Kaan Kalayci
- League: Football Victoria
- Website: http://www.northernfalconsfc.com
Home colours	Away colours

Northern Falcons Football Club is a semi-professional football club that is based in the northern Melbourne suburb of Thornbury. Founded in 1986 by the Sicilian Floridian community of Melbourne, the Falcons currently compete in Football Victoria-sanctioned competitions for junior boys, junior girls, senior women, Access All Abilities and Masters.

== History ==
=== On field ===
The football club was established under the name of Flemington Floridia Soccer Club in October 1986 as the sporting arm of the Floridia Social Club. The club's inaugural home venue was the parkland at the foot of the Flemington commission housing on Flemington Road. The club debuted Victorian state league football in 1993, participating in the Provisional League Division Three, now formally recognized as Victoria's eighth tier. Its senior squad achieved promotion in 2005 and in 2008 into the Victorian State League Division 4, where it competes today. The Falcons were runner's up in 2019 also but were not promoted to Victorian State League Division 3. Prior to the last match of the season against second placed Heidelberg Eagles, the Falcons only had to draw at a minimum to ensure its first premiership, and promotion, but were defeated 5–0.

At the end of 2023 the club decided to abandon their senior men's teams instead choosing to focus on junior development, their first senior women's team and their growing AAA program. This decision was made due to the growing discontent with the general administration of the senior men's competition by the governing body Football Victoria and the increasing amount of financial resources required to remain competitive.

=== Off field ===
The club is led by president Hasan Ibrahim and a team of volunteers.

=== Name timeline ===
Name	Period
Flemington Floridia SC	1986–1994
Flemington Falcons SC	1994–2004
Northern Falcons FC	2004–present

== Staff ==
As of 9 July 2024

Football department

Name	Role
Technical Director	Kaan Kalayci
Coerver Australia	Program Provider
George Jolevski	Programs Leader

=== Executive ===
Name	Role
Joe Pizzo	Acting President
	Secretary
Joe Pizzo	Treasurer

== Honours ==
- Victorian Sixth Tier

Runner's up (2): 2008 (North-West), 2019 (North)

- Victorian Seventh Tier

Runner's up (1): 2005 (North-West)
