= Corio Soccer Club =

Soccer club in Bell Park, Geelong, Australia

- Founded: 1955; 71 years ago
- Ground: Hume Reserve, Bell Park, Vic, Australia
- League: Victorian State League 1 North–West
- 2024: 10th of 12
- Website: https://coriosc.com.au
Home colours	Away colours

Corio Soccer Club is an Australian semi-professional soccer club in Bell Park, Geelong, Australia.

Corio's senior men's team currently competes in the Victorian State League 1.

Junior teams play in the local football competitions run by the Geelong Regional Football Committee.

== History ==
In 1955 a local Dutch newspaper sponsored an international cup competition named the "New World" Cup. Among eight teams, a German team was entered, made up of players from the International Harvester team.

Corio Soccer Club was started shortly after by Norman Haigh (president), J. Hancock (secretary) and Harry Pettig (foundation member).

After relative success in the late 1950s the team was promoted to the Victorian Amateur Soccer Football Association division two in 1958 and promotion again to division one in 1959. Corio along with all other Geelong clubs were moved out of the Melbourne Metropolitan leagues into the reformed Ballarat, Geelong and District Soccer Association as part of the restructuring of Victorian football.

In 1987 Corio SC merged with the Italian club Geelong United to become Corio-Geelong United.

In 1995, Corio-Geelong United merge with the Northern Suburbs club - a Hungarian club playing out of Hendy street, Corio. Officially titled Corio Northern Suburbs United Social and Sports Club Inc.

In 2013, Corio win the State League division four with Adrian Cervinski winning the best and fairest award.

Junior football was relaunched in 2019 expanding to 120 players by 2021 after a period of no junior teams at the club.

In 2020, Corio Soccer Club announced the signing of three talented Italian players: Lorenzo Princigalli, Ivan D’Adamo, and Giorgio Torelli. The addition of these players was aimed at strengthening Corio 's squad for the upcoming State League 1 season.

In 2023, long time club president Mario Gregorio steps down as head of the club. He held the role from 2016.

In 2025 the club sign Canadian Owen Sheppard from Valour FC as part of a raft of signings aimed at winning promotion to the VPL. Corio are docked points after fielding an ineligible player and fall from 1st position on the table to 9th.

== Facility ==
Corio Soccer Club play their home matches at Hume reserve, Bell Park, Geelong.

Hume reserve has three pitches with lights, change and club room facilities.

In 1960, two parcels of residential land adjacent to Hume reserve are purchased by members of the club. Later, club rooms are constructed which remain in use until 2021.

In 2015, pitch four at Hume reserve was converted into a water retention pond after a period of prolonged drought. The reserve was once a facility of six pitches that had been gradually reduced as land had been sold off for industrial and urban development.

In 2022, Corio moved into the newly developed $3 million pavilion and change rooms at Hume Reserve.

Corio sign a three year agreement with Geelong Galaxy to allow use of the new Hume Reserve facility - Galaxy moving away from Stead Park as sub-tenants of Geelong Soccer Club.

== Honors ==
- State League Division Four West - Winners 2013
- Victorian Amateur Soccer Football Association Division Two North - Winners 1958
- Geelong Advertiser Cup/Geelong Community Cup winners: 1982,1998, 2010, 2017, 2021
- Ballarat and Geelong Districts Association Division 1 (Ted Jones Trophy) - Winners 1973 (Corio's local team).

== Divisional history ==
- Victorian State League Division 1 North-West (2019-)
- Victorian State League Division 2 North-West (2016-2019)
- Victorian State League Division 1 North-West (2015)
- Victorian State League Division 2 North-West (2014)
- Victorian State League Division 4 West (2013) champions
- Victorian Provisional League Division 1 North-West (2008-2012)
- Victorian State League Division 3 North-West (2005-2007)
- Victorian State League Division 2 North-West (2004)
- Victorian State League Division 3 North-West (2000-2003)
- Victorian State League Division 4 (1994-1999)
- Victorian State League Division 3 (1991-1993)
- Victorian Metropolitan League Division 3 (1984-1990)
- Victorian Metropolitan League Division 4 (1983)
- Victorian Metropolitan League Division 3 (1981-1982)
- Victorian Metropolitan League Division 4 (1975-1980)
- Victorian Metropolitan League Division 3 (1973-1974)
- Victorian Metropolitan League Division 2 (1972)
- Victorian Metropolitan League Division 3 (1971)
- Victorian Metropolitan League Division 4 (1968-1970)
- Ballarat/Geelong & DSA (1964-1967)
- Victorian Metropolitan League Division 1 North (1961-1963)
- Victorian Division 1 North (1959-1960)
- Victorian Division 2 North (1958) champions

== See also ==
- Geelong Regional Football Committee
- Geelong Community Cup
