= Bell Park Sports Club =

Bell Park Sports Club
- Full name: Bell Park Sports Club
- Nickname: Bell Park
- Founded: 1959; 67 years ago
- Ground: Bell Park Sports Club, Batesford, Victoria
- President: Rose Pirrottina
- League: VSL 4 West
- Website: https://www.bellparksportsclub.com.au/
Home colours	Away colours

Bell Park Sports Club is a soccer club from Batesford, Victoria, Australia.

The soccer club fields teams in senior men (State League Division 4 West), senior women (GRFC Women's Division One), juniors boys and girls grades.

== History ==
The club was founded in 1959 by Frank Vanjek, Gino Tromba and Michael Parks when players broke away from the Geelong Soccer Club. Sergio Bassi coached them in their first season.

In 1970 the club purchased ten acres of land in Batesford - their current ground and facility.

In 1981 Bell Park won the inaugural Geelong Advertiser Cup (1- 0) over the Hamlyn Rangers.

In 1989 and 1990 Bell Park win back to back championships to enter division one of the State League in 1991. Former Socceroo Tommy Cumming leading the team as player and coach in 1991.

Five relegations from 1994 to 2004 see the club enter State League division 3 in 2005.

In 2022, Geelong Council agreed to purchase of land and assets of the club for $2.55 million, to ensure the club's survival.

The club lighting was upgraded in 2023 and new change facilities are completed in 2024.

The senior men's team wins promotion from State League 4 to State League 3 for the 2027 season.

== Honours ==
=== Men ===
==== State ====
- 1971: Ballarat and Geelong Districts League (1st)
- 1976: Victorian Metropolitan League Division 3 (1st)
- 1981: Victorian Metropolitan League Division 3 (1st)
- 1989: Victorian League Division 3 (1st)
- 1990: Victorian League Division 2 (1st)

==== Geelong Community Cup winners ====
- 1981, 1988, 2016

== Presidential history ==
Name	Years
Fr Patrick O’Gorman	1959-1963
Guido Para	1964
William Stoelzle	1965
Guido Para	1966
Stan Yates	1967-1970
Michael Parks	1971-1974
Mario Brumniach	1975-1982
R. Hicks	1983
Peter Teply	1984
Mario Brumniach	1985-1986
Tim Cuell	1987-1988
Charlie Didomenico	1989-1995
Joe Parks	1996-1997
Pat Demassi	1998
Sam Cortorillo	1999-2001
Gino Tromba	2002-2004
Liz Witecki	2005
Stephen J. Gstalter	2006-2011
Gino Tromba	2012-2013
David Secen	2013-2015
Nick Palmieri	2015-2017
Rose Pirrottina	2017-Current

== See also ==
- Geelong Regional Football Association
