= Geelong Galaxy United =

- Full name: Geelong Galaxy United FC
- Founded: 2016
- Ground: Myers Reserve, Bell Post Hill
- Website: https://geelonggalaxyfc.com
Home colours

Geelong Galaxy United is an Australian Soccer club based in Geelong Australia. It is the only women's only soccer club in the Geelong region.

== History ==
The club was formed in 2016 as a joint venture of Greater Geelong Galaxy Girls and Surfcoast FC. The club was the only regional team in the inaugural National Premier Leagues Victoria Women (NPLW) in Victoria.

Banyul-warri Fields in Torquay was the clubs home ground in 2016.

Vince Ierardo was head coach in their first season as Galaxy reach the grand final of the WNPL league losing to Calder United.

In 2017 the club made the NPLW grand final, again coming runners-up.

In 2019, The club relocates to Stead Park - the home of Geelong Soccer Club.

The Senior team was relegated to the newly formed Victorian Premier League Women (VPLW). Reducing the NPLW to eight teams from the metropolitan Melbourne area.

In 2021 the club has moved from former home at Stead park, Norlane to Hume reserve in Bell Park - the home ground of Corio Soccer Club.

In 2024, The club announced they have reached an agreement with Geelong Rangers to utilise their home ground of Myers Reserve in Bell Post Hill.

== See also ==
- Geelong Region Football Committee
- Soccer in Geelong
- Football Victoria
