= Steve Horvat =

Australian soccer player (born 1971)

Personal information
- Full name: Steven Horvat
- Date of birth: 14 March 1971 (age 55)
- Place of birth: Geelong, Australia
- Position: Defender

Youth career
- North Geelong Warriors
- 1987–1988: AIS

Senior career*
Years	Team	Apps	(Gls)
1988–1989	Melbourne Croatia	26	(2)
1989–1991	Sunshine George Cross	22	(1)
1991–1994	North Geelong Warriors	47	(4)
1994–1995	Melbourne Knights	24	(3)
1995–1996	Hajduk Split	15	(1)
1996–1998	Carlton	17	(1)
1998–1999	Crystal Palace	0	(0)
1999–2000	Carlton	7	(0)
2000–2003	Melbourne Knights	47	(3)

International career
1996	Australia Olympic	2	(0)
1994–2002	Australia	32	(1)
Medal record
Men's football
Representing Australia
FIFA Confederations Cup
Runner-up	1997 Saudi Arabia
Third place	2001 South Korea-Japan
OFC Nations Cup
Winner	2000 Tahiti
Runner-up	2002 New Zealand
AFC–OFC Challenge Cup
Runner-up	2001 Japan
- * Club domestic league appearances and goals

Steven Horvat (born 14 March 1971) is an Australian former professional soccer player.

== Club career ==
A graduate of the Australian Institute of Sport, Horvat began his career with Melbourne Croatia. He later played with Sunshine George Cross, North Geelong Warriors, the Melbourne Knights (for whom he won the Joe Marston Medal), Hajduk Split, Crystal Palace (although he didn't make a league appearance) and Carlton. He retired in March 2003 at the age of 32. Horvat made a total of 96 appearances in the National Soccer League.

== International career ==
Horvat was a regular member of the Australian national side, making 32 appearances between 1994 and 2002, and participated in a number of international competitions, including the 1987 FIFA U-16 World Championship, 1996 Summer Olympics, 1997 FIFA Confederations Cup, 2001 FIFA Confederations Cup and 2002 OFC Nations Cup. Horvat also played in the game with highest scoreline in an international football match, when Australia beat American Samoa 31–0.

== Personal life ==
Horvat has a daughter, Chantel, who plays basketball at the University of California, Los Angeles.

== Honours ==
Australia

- FIFA Confederations Cup: runner-up, 1997; 3rd place, 2001
- OFC Nations Cup: 2000; runner-up, 2002 OFC Nations Cup
- AFC–OFC Challenge Cup: runner-up 2001
