= North Geelong Warriors FC =

- Full name: North Geelong Warriors; Football Club
- Nicknames: North, Warriors, Croatia, Kroacija
- Founded: November 1967; 59 years ago
- Ground: Australian–Croatian Sporting Centre, Elcho Park, Lara
- Capacity: 10,000 (200 Seating Capacity)
- President: Tom Pausak
- Manager: Stuart Begg
- League: Victoria Premier League 1
- 2026: 9th of 14
- Website: http://www.ngwfc.com.au
Home colours	Away colours

North Geelong Warriors Football Club, formerly known as North Geelong Croatia, is an Australian professional soccer club from the regional Victorian city of Geelong. The club currently competes in the Victoria Premier League 1, Australia's third division in the country's league system and second division in Victoria. The club was founded in 1967 by a large contingent of ethnic Croatians in the city of Geelong. The Warriors' home base is Elcho Park in the northern Geelong suburb of Lara.

North Geelong is a regular participant in the Australian-Croatian Soccer Tournament, which it has hosted four times and won for the first time in 2014, in Wollongong, New South Wales. The club's greatest achievement is winning the 1992 Victorian Premier League title, becoming the first promoted side to achieve the feat.

== History ==
=== Beginnings ===
North Geelong Croatia Soccer Club was formed in December 1967 by newly arrived Croatian migrants Mirko Hrkač, Ivan Sesar, Vinko Radojević and Aldo Siketa. North Geelong's first season saw it compete in Division 2 of the Ballarat, Geelong and Districts Soccer Association (BGDSA) in 1968, finishing in fourth place of the ten team division. The following year, North competed in Division 1 and a reserve side was formed. In 1970, the club fielded its first junior side, which competed under the name North United.

=== The 1970s ===
In 1972, the Club competed in the Victorian Provisional League for the first time in its history. The season was marred by an incident involving an altercation with a referee in North Geelong's Round 6 match against Werribee which saw the club immediately expelled from the Victorian Provisional League. The VSF disallowed the club from competing in any further matches that year.

North Geelong was accepted back into the BGDSA competition in 1973, where it was, for the majority of seasons, the dominant force in the league. Croatia won the BDGSA league five times in six years between 1973 and 1978.

=== Return to State competition ===
In 1979, North Geelong re-joined the Victorian Provisional League, run by the VSF, and was placed into Division Three. North finished in a very respectable third place. Two years earlier, North Geelong Croatia bought a block of land in Lara where its current Elcho park home base on Gibbons Road now stands. The land cost a sum of $12,000.

=== Rise Through the Ranks ===
Croatia then won back-to-back premierships in 1980, and 1981. In 1982, following its Provisional League Division Two title, North Geelong skipped promotion to Provisional League Division One, thanks to a league restructure, and entered the Victorian Metropolitan League Division Four, at the time the fifth tier of Victorian soccer, the highest rung the club had reached in its short history.

North Geelong made the move to Elcho Park in 1986, hosting the Geelong Pre-Season Cup in pre-season, winning the competition. The first competitive league game at the venue was a 3–3 draw between North Geelong and Essendon City on 29 March 1986.

After four consecutive top four finishes in Division Two, North Geelong finally achieved promotion when it took out the league championship in 1989. North Geelong Croatia endured a difficult start to life in Division One in 1990. After a shaky start, Branko Culina was able to lead the club to a respectable seventh-place finish.

=== Victorian Premier League Era ===
In 1991, with the club run by a new committee headed by Steve Horvat Senior and the first team managed by Čulina, North Geelong Croatia won the Division 1 title, finishing a point ahead of Knox City. and hence promotion to the Victorian Premier League (VPL), reaching the pinnacle of Victorian soccer for the first time in the club's history.

In its inaugural season in the VPL, the club surprised everyone finishing first and collecting the Minor Premiership. The club went on to make the Grand Final. They faced former National Soccer League champions Brunswick Juventus at Middle Park. North Geelong's George Karkaletsis opened the scoring on the 22nd minute. Brunswick equalized 4 minutes later. The match remained 1–1 at full-time, taking it into extra time. North Geelong ripped Brunswick apart scoring three unanswered goals from Adrian Cervinski, Robert Markovac and Robert Cosic. It was an unprecedented event, the only time a newly promoted side had won the title in their first season, a record that still stands to this day. Players in this championship side included Steve Horvat, Adrian Cervinski and David Cervinski. All three players would become successful players in the National Soccer League. All three were a part of the Melbourne Croatia NSL championship side of the mid 90s.

1993 was another successful season. The club finished third in the regular season, making the finals for a second year in a row. But this time their finals campaign did not prove to rewarding as in the previous season. The club lost both its finals matches, including a heartbreaking loss in extra time to Sunshine George Cross. The next three seasons saw the club miss out on finals action, finishing mid table. But some joy came with the club producing club legend Richard O'Sullivian and future star player and future socceroo in Josip Skoko.

In 1994, North Geelong Croatia Soccer Club became North Geelong Warriors Soccer Club when the Victorian Soccer Federation banned ethnic names.

In 1997, North Geelong's six-year stint in the top-flight came to an end as it endured relegation from the Premier League.

=== Regression, Rebuild ===
In 1999, the club was relegated once more, to the Victorian State League Two North-West. The Club remained in Division 2 for the next six season, with mixed results.

Throughout the early 2000s, North Geelong battled away in the Victorian State League Division 2 North-West, finishing in mid-table each year for the period.

2004 marked the beginning of players returning home to North Geelong having left the club in the 90s for NSL and VPL opportunities. The Cervinski brothers, Mijo Trupković, Ante Deak and Greg Šarić were all players that returned to the club from 2004 onwards.

In 2005, with the introduction of new coach Robert Krajačić, North Geelong blazed its way to the State League Division Two North-West title, losing only 4 matches. North Geelong were subject to relegation in 2007, returning to State League 2 N/W.

In 2009, Vinko Buljubašić led the club back to State League 1, winning State League 2 North-West.

After an inconsistent 2010 season, the club finished in 8th spot in the Victorian State League Division One, well clear of relegation, but also lower than expectations. In the summer of 2011, Vinko Buljubasic was relieved of his duties as manager and replaced by Ante Skoko with his brother, a recently retired professional soccer player, Josip Skoko, as his assistant. North Geelong finished in 6th place in State League One in 2011.

At the end of the 2012 season, with the club just missing out on promotion, the Skoko brothers stepped down from their joint post as managers of the club.

In 2013, Mario Jurjevic replaced Ante Skoko with disastrous results, having just three points from 12 games and Skoko was brought back. Despite a late revival, North Geelong were relegated from State 1.

=== National Premier Leagues Victoria (2014–Present) ===
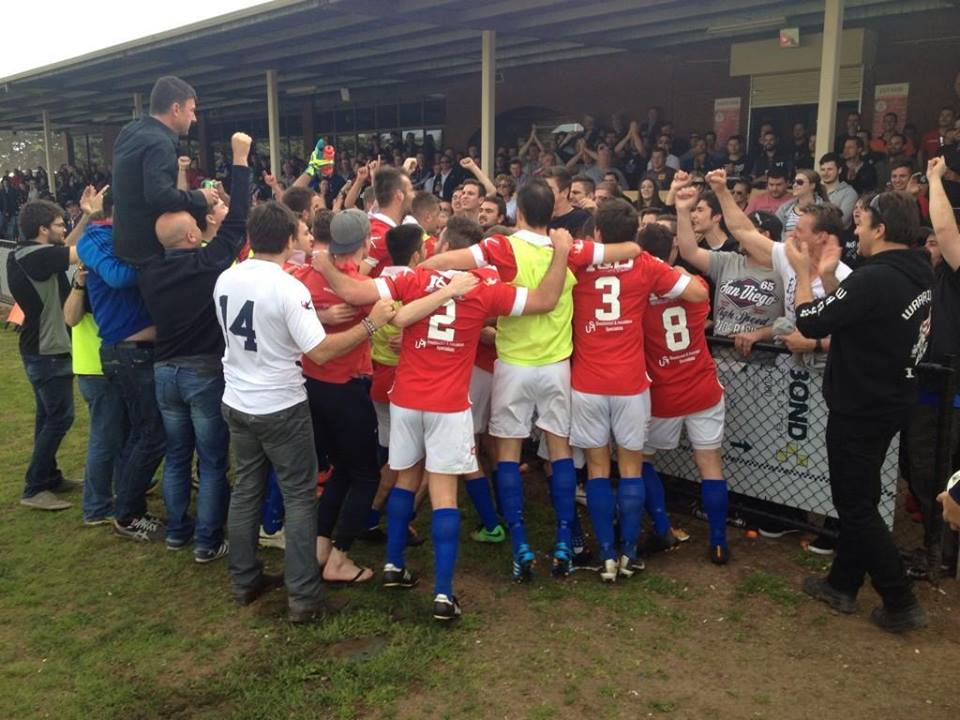
Warriors fans and players celebrate promotion

After a restructuring of soccer in Victoria in 2014, North Geelong found their bid for a place in the National Premier Leagues accepted, therefore avoiding relegation and remaining in the second tier of soccer in Victoria, now known as the National Premier Leagues Victoria 1. In North Geelong's first ever NPL1 contest, the club came away with a 2–1 away victory over sister club Dandenong City. Ante Skoko resigned from his post three months into the new season, with the club in 11th place in the new 14 team league. Former St Albans Saints manager Micky Čolina took over. The club sealed promotion to the top division on 13 September 2014, with a 1–0 win over rivals St Albans, ending the season in second place, three points adrift of league champions Avondale Heights. The club also won the Geelong Pre-Season Cup, Victorian Croatian Cup and won the Australian-Croatian Soccer Tournament for the first time in early October.

Ahead of the 2015 season, the club re-signed Čolina to a two-year deal and retained the core of the promoted squad. The season started with a 0–2 loss to eventual champions Bentleigh Greens at Kingston Heath Soccer Complex, followed up by a 0–3 loss to eventual premiers South Melbourne at Elcho Park, but Round 3 saw the Warriors record their first points of the season with a 6–1 victory over Green Gully, with winger Robbie Zadworny scoring a hattrick. However, after 14 rounds of the 2015 NPL Victoria season, the club were in bottom place with just five points earned. The Reds managed to turn it around, though, securing 16 points in the last 11 rounds of the season, including two wins in the last two games of the season against Dandenong Thunder and Werribee City, with both of the wins confirming relegation for its opponents. The club finished in 12th place and qualified for the promotion / relegation playoff against Melbourne Victory Youth. North Geelong lost 2–0 in front of over 1,000 at J L Murphy Reserve in Port Melbourne, confirming relegation to NPL2 for the 2016 season.

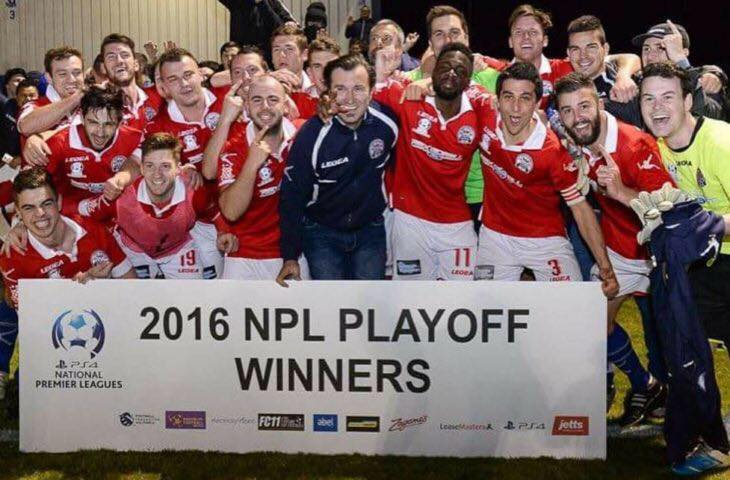
North Geelong Warriors celebrating promotion in 2016

During the off-season there were a number of departures. The club signed Kene Eze, an American striker who previously turned out for Pittsburgh Riverhounds. North Geelong announced that a partnership had been formed with NPL South Australia side Adelaide Raiders, a fellow Croatian-Australian founded soccer side. North Geelong travelled to Gepps Cross and, on 6 February, won the first ever Friendship Cup against Adelaide Raiders by a score of 2–1. The league competition started with a trip to sister-club St Albans which finished in a 1–1 draw. North Geelong moved into outright top spot of the NPL2 West ladder after a 1–0 win over Brunswick City, a match in which Nicholas Jurčić tapped in a 93rd-minute winner. A tough run of results followed, with the Warriors winning just one of the next seven games in the league, slipping to fourth position on the ladder. North exited the 2016 FFA Cup at the hands of South Melbourne in Round 6 with a 0–2 loss at bogey ground JL Murphy Reserve. The Warriors went undefeated in the last ten games of the season, pushing the title race to the last day. St Albans took out the NPL2 West title and automatic promotion on the final match-day with a 1–0 win over Whittlesea Ranges while North Geelong took second place and a spot in the NPL2 promotion playoff against NPL2 East runner-up Dandenong Thunder. The Warriors produced a mercurial performance in the NPL2 promotion playoff, defeating the fancied Thunder 4–1, with Michael Anderson grabbing a hattrick. North then faced Richmond in the NPL promotion / relegation playoff and confirmed an immediate return to the top fight of Victorian soccer with a 4–0 win, Matt Thorne scoring twice with Michael Anderson and Michael Simms adding singles in another emphatic win.

Returning to the top-flight, the Warriors signed Andrew Doig from Moreland City, Bobby Vidanoski and Marko Stevanja from Werribee City and Ivan Grgić from Melbourne Knights. Taking out the first Friendship Cup at Elcho Park with a 4–1 win over Adelaide Raiders in pre-season, North Geelong went into Round 1 high on confidence and took a point from CB Smith Reserve in a 1–1 draw against Pascoe Vale. North managed just one more point in the following seven rounds and were thumped 8–0 at Olympic Village by a ten-man Heidelberg United. A mini mid-season revival ensued, where the Warriors went one win, four draws and one loss in six games, but nine consecutive losses following confirmed another relegation back to NPL2 for 2018. Following the relegation, Čolina and North Geelong agreed to part ways and the coach left after three and a half seasons at the helm.

North Geelong began its rebuild for the 2018 season by appointing former A-League assistant coach Luciano Trani as its senior head coach. The appointment was billed as one of its biggest coups in recent history for the club. Trani oversaw a huge turnover in the playing ranks, with just two players, Michael Anderson and Marko Stevanja, from the 2017 side remaining. Long-time servants Daniel Zilic (10 years), Darren Lewis and Matthew Townley (6 years), and Vito Cichello (5 years) all departed the club. North and Trani turned to local talent and youth to build the squad. Former players Michael Boyar, Anthony Banovac, Hamish Flavell and Nicholas Anderson returned to Elcho Park, while former junior players Jamie Noggler and Thomas Hidic ensured a strong club-grown feel to the crop. 11 games into the 2018 season, with the club sitting in fourth place, head coach Trani handed in his resignation. On 1 June 2018, North Geelong named James Coutts as the new senior head coach of the club, confirming also that he would be taking over in a player-coach capacity. The club finished the 2018 NPL2 West season in third place, two points short of the NPL2 promotion playoff spot. Earlier in the season, North Geelong were deducted three competition points for a melee against Melbourne Victory Youth. United States import Darius Madison was the top scorer with 13 league goals, following by 18-year-old Noggler who scored 7.

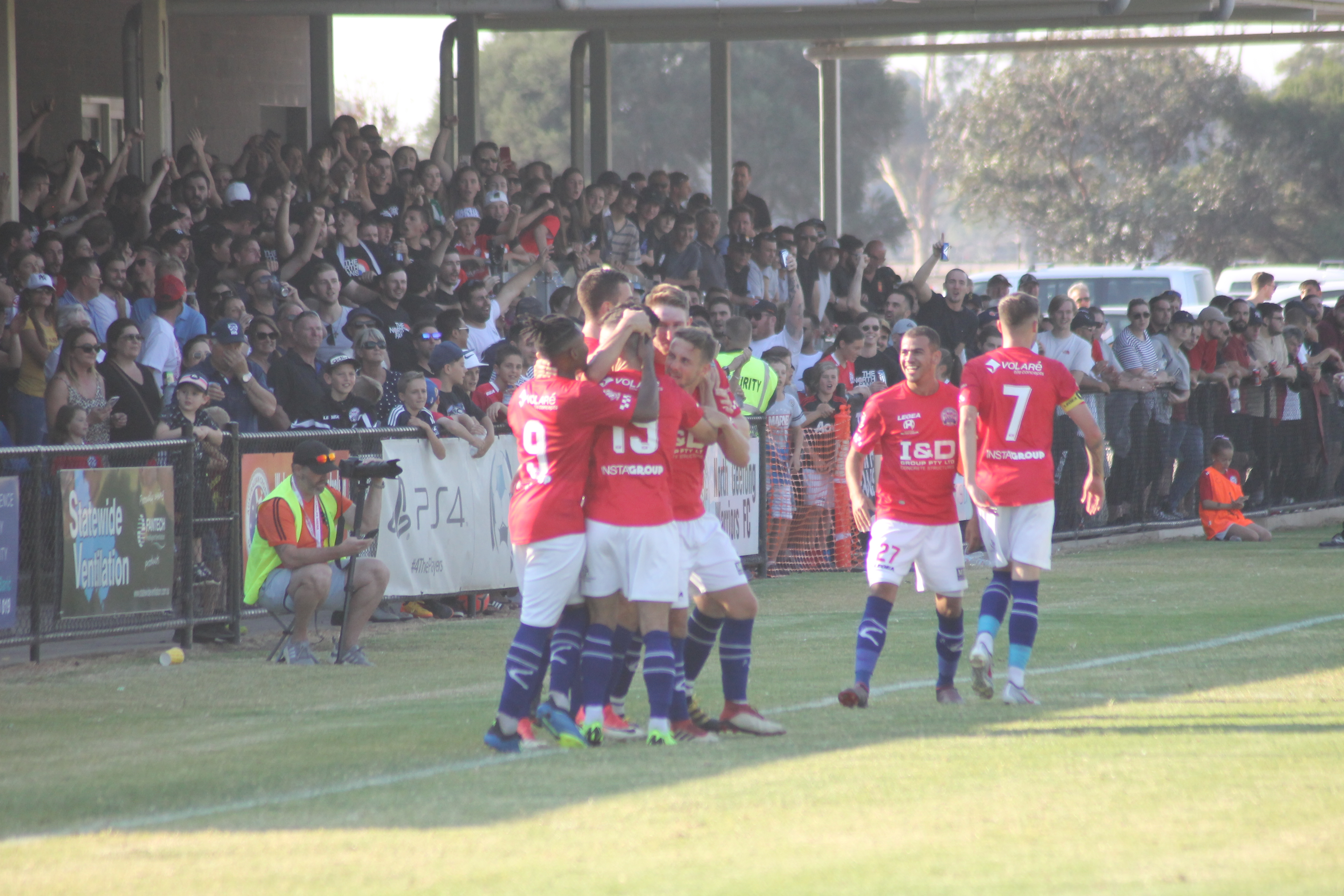
North Geelong Warriors vs Geelong, Saturday 16 March 2019

The 2019 season had far more stability than the previous, with Coutts able to re-sign 12 members of the 2018 squad. With Geelong achieving promotion in 2018, 2019 was the first Geelong derby of the decade. North Geelong won 4–2 at home, in front of 1400 people. With a promotion playoff spot on the cards, North Geelong's season almost unraveled with 4 losses in 5 league games but with a win against then-league leaders Werribee got the season back on track but Madison departed the club after round 24, scoring his 16th league goal of the season in a 1–0 victory over Springvale White Eagles. On 28 August 2019, after a 1–0 loss to Melbourne Victory Youth, effectively ending the Warriors' promotion charge, it was announced that player-coach Coutts would be departing the club at season's end, returning to Gold Coast for family reasons.

North Geelong appointed Zeljko Gagula as its new head coach for the 2020 NPL2 season. Gagula had most recently coached a Melbourne Knights junior side to a league title. After just one game, a 2–0 cup loss to Moreland Zebras, the 2020 season was postponed indefinitely, due to the COVID-19 pandemic, with the season being suspended just four days out from the opening round.

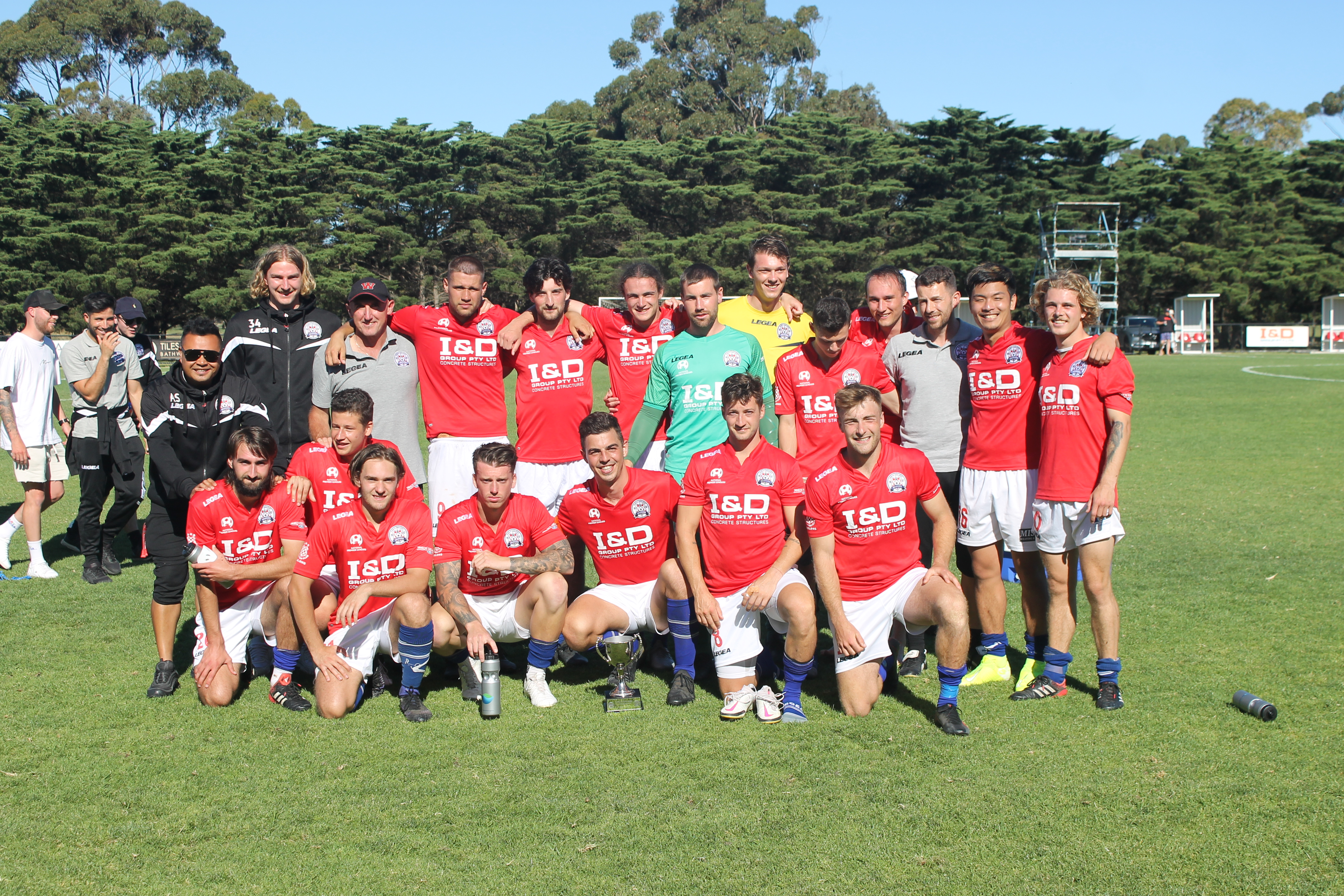
2021 Victorian Croatian Cup Winners

The Warriors began preparations for the 2021 season by taking out the annual pre-season competition the Victorian Croatian Cup, contesting between Melbourne Knights, St Albans Saints and Dandenong City, beating Dandenong City 2–0 in the final game. The first competitive fixture of the season came in Round 4 of the Victorian 2021 FFA Cup preliminary rounds, where North came back from 0–2 down to beat Kingston City FC 3–2 at Elcho Park, with a brace from new signing Luka Jurković. A mixed start to the NPL 2 season saw North Geelong pick up a win and three draws, but were followed by three consecutive losses and led to the departure of Gagula. Assistant manager Stuart Begg was given the head coach role on an interim basis until the end of the 2021 season. Under Begg, North Geelong would win three matches, draw three and lose one amidst further season interruptions due to the pandemic. The season was ultimately cancelled after 14 games played with North "finishing" in 7th place in the 12-team league.

Begg was confirmed as the club's permanent head coach ahead of the 2022 NPL 2 season. The pre-season delivered silverware, with the club winning both the 2022 Geelong Pre-Season Cup and the 2022 Victorian Croatian Cup, the latter for the second consecutive year. The Geelong Cup win was the club's first Geelong Cup title since 2014. After an opening day loss to Northcote City FC, North Geelong then went on an 11-game unbeaten streak, which included nine consecutive wins from rounds 4 to 12, the nine consecutive wins a feat achieved for the first time this century. The run included a comeback win against FC Bulleen Lions were North was 2–0 down at half time away from home but came back to win 2–3. Promotion from NPL2 to the top division was confirmed in Round 21, with a 3–0 home win against Bulleen, with the Warriors returning to Victoria's highest tier for the first time since 2017. North Geelong missed out on the league championship on the final day of the season despite leading the league for the entire second half of the season, losing to Moreland City FC 1-0 and leapfrogging the Geelong club with the win. New recruit Caleb Mikulić took out the league's Golden Boot award with 18 goals, Hamish Flavell won the NPL2 Goalkeeper of the Year award and Stuart Begg was named NPL2 Coach of the Year.

On 28 March 2023, head coach Stuart Begg resigned after 37 official games in charge, taking over in 2021. The resignation followed a poor start to the 2023 season, with a first round win followed by five consecutive losses. Assistant coach Tomi Gavran took over first team coaching duties as caretaker. After three consecutive losses following the coaching change, Gavran picked up his first point as head coach with a 1–1 draw against Heidelberg United away from home in Round 10 and first win the following round against St Albans Saints at Elcho Park. Despite back-to-back wins against Hume City and Moreland City in Rounds 18 and 19, relegation back to NPL Victoria 2 was confirmed for North Geelong for 2024 in the final round of the season with a 0–2 loss to grand finalists South Melbourne. Early in the post-season, North Geelong confirmed that Gavran would not continue in his role as head coach.

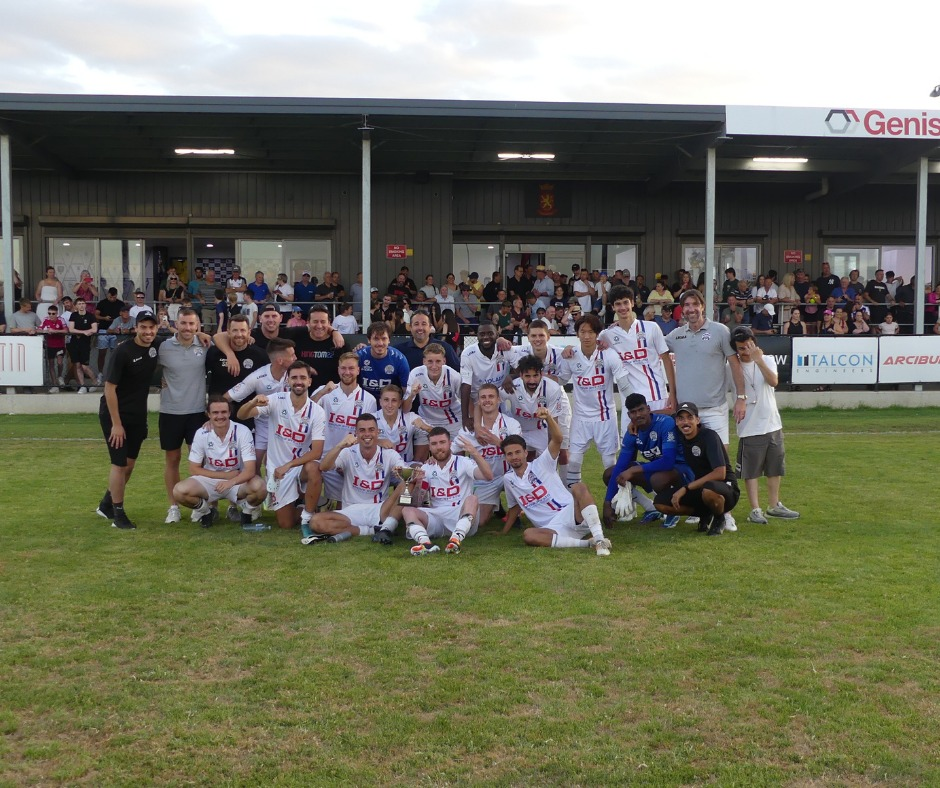
Geelong Pre-Season Cup 2024

In September 2023, North Geelong Warriors confirmed that one of its most decorated former players, Joey Didulica, would take over as senior head coach at the club. Didulica's career as a goalkeeper saw him move from North Geelong to Melbourne Knights in 1996 and then to AFC Ajax in 1999. He made four appearances for the Croatia national football team and was selected for both the UEFA Euro 2004 and 2006 FIFA World Cup. Prior to taking the senior manager role with the Warriors, Joey spent a decade coaching in the club's decorated junior program. Didulica left his position 13 rounds into the Victoria Premier League 1 in mid-May, with North Geelong bottom of the table, managing just four points in the first half of the season and losing its first nine games in the league. Stuart Begg returned as coach and managed back-to-back wins in rounds 15 and 16, however North Geelong managed just one more win in the last 10 games of the season, suffering a successive relegation.

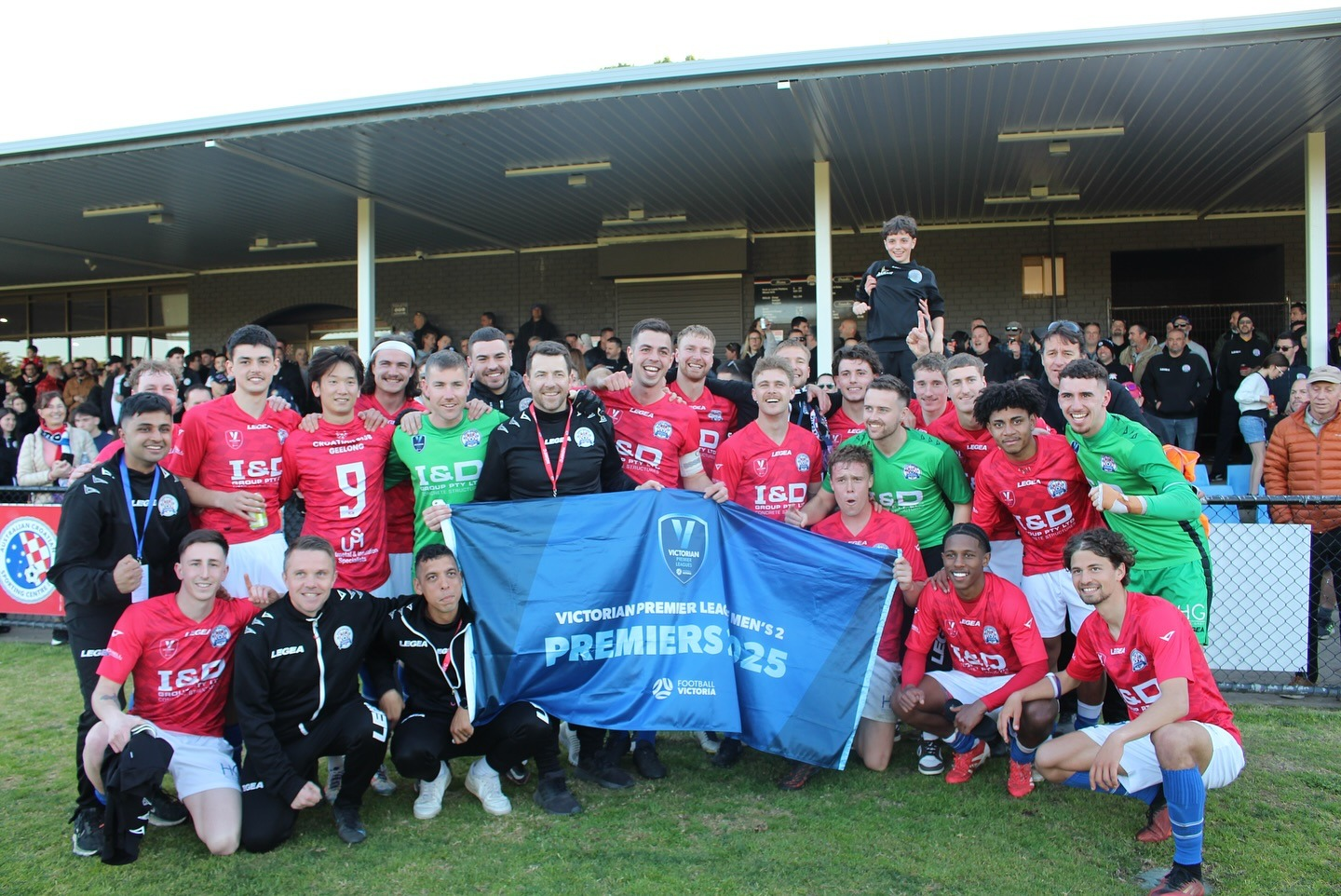
2025 VPL2 Premiers

2025 would be the club's first time in the Victorian third division since 2009. Begg was reappointed for the 2026 season and retained many players from the prior year's squad; including Anthony Banovac, George Elliss, Casian Anghel, Matthew Stosic and Sergio Escudero. These players, in addition to new signings Angus Chapman, Aguer Manyiel and Alexander Mazzaferro, would prove key as the Warriors returned to VPL1 at the first time of asking, securing promotion with three games to spare, via a 2–1 win over Nunawading City SC and then the VPL2 title on the final day of the season with a 3–2 win over old foes Brunswick Juventus FC. Youngster Sonny Brimmer cemented his breakout season, scoring 16 goals and secured the league golden boot award. Lochlann Mcgrath returned to the club after an overseas spell and scored 6 goals in 13 games. Incredibly, North Geelong went 16 games unbeaten as it claimed the title, drawing just 2 games and winning 14 from rounds 11 to 26. At the end of season Victorian Football Gala Anthony Banovac took out the VPLM2 league Best and Fairest and Begg was named Coach of the Year.

== Women's soccer ==
North Geelong Warriors won the 2013 Women's State League 2 North-West championship, beating Keilor Park SC to the title by one point and earning promotion to State League 1. In 2015, North Geelong Warriors placed third in the Women's State League 1, the second tier of women's soccer in Victoria.

The following season, the Women's National Premier Leagues Victoria was introduced and Geelong side Galaxy United FC was named as an inaugural participant. Becoming the new highest-ranked club in the region for women's soccer, many of North Geelong's players departed for the new entity and the women's team was disbanded after a sustained period of success, with the side containing former W-League and Victorian Women's Premier League players in recent years, highlighted by Laura Spiranovic.

In 2019, North Geelong relaunched senior women's soccer at the club, entering two senior sides into the local Geelong competition, one in Division 1 and one in Division 2. Further, the 2019 season marked the first time in the club's history that the Warriors had over 100 registered female participants.

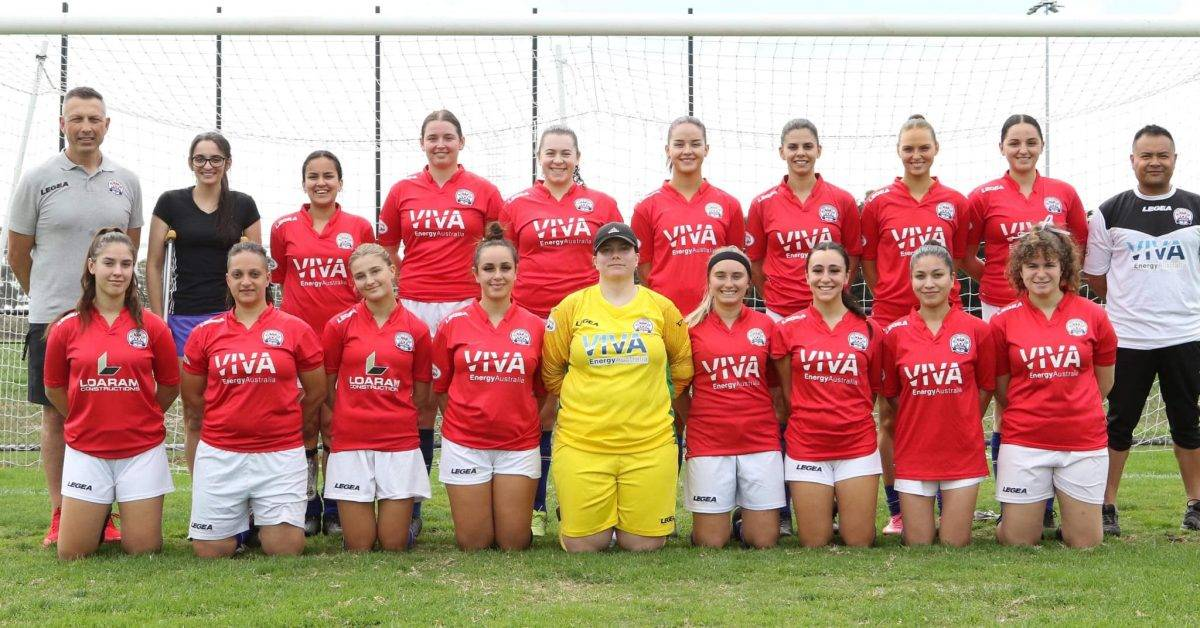
2022 North Geelong Warriors Women's Team and Staff

Following 2020, where there was no football season due to the COVID-19 pandemic, North Geelong Women rejoined the State Leagues, competing in Women's State League 3 West in 2021. The season was cancelled after 12 games, also due to the pandemic. After 12 games, North Geelong had a perfect record of 12 wins, with 68 goals scored and just 1 conceded. Due to the disruption caused by the pandemic, the Victorian Women's State Leagues were restructured for 2022, and North Geelong were granted a place in Women's State League 1 North-West, the third tier of women's football in Victoria. Not to be deterred by its rapid ascent, North Geelong managed a fifth-place finish in the 10-team league in 2022. After the conclusion of the league season, North Geelong went on to win the 2022 Australian-Croatian Soccer Tournament women's division.

In 2023, the Warriors finished third in the Women's State League 1 North-West competition, followed by a fourth-place finish in 2024. Following the conclusion of the 2024 league season, North Geelong once again won the Australian-Croatian Soccer Tournament Women's Division 1, which was hosted by St Albans Dinamo SC.

== Notable coaches ==
- (Australia) Branko Culina
- (Australia) Eddie Krncevic (2007)
- (Australia) Vinko Buljubašić
- (Australia) Josip Skoko (assistant)
- (Australia) Luciano Trani
- (England) James Coutts
- (Croatia) (Australia) Joey Didulica

== Players ==
=== International representatives ===
- Francis Awaritefe – Australia national team (1993–1996).
- Steve Horvat – Australia U17 (1987), Australia U20 (1989), Australia U23 (1996), Australia national team (1994–2002).
- Josip Skoko – Australia U20 (1993–1995), Australia U23 (2000), Australia (1997–2007).
- Adrian Cervinski – Australia U23 (1994)
- Joey Didulica – Croatia national team (2004–2006)
- Matthew Spiranovic – Australia U17 (2004–2005), Australia U20 (2006), Australia U23 (2007–2008), Australia (since 2008).
- Ante Cicak – Australia national team U20 (2007)'
- Noa Skoko - Croatia U17 (2022–2023), Croatia U18 (2023)

== Current squad ==
=== First-team ===
As of 2 September 2025 Note: Flags indicate national team as defined under FIFA eligibility rules; some limited exceptions apply. Players may hold more than one non-FIFA nationality.

No.	Pos.	Nation	Player
1	GK	AUS	Hamish Flavell
4	DF	PNG	Raymond Diho
5	DF	AUS	Anthony Banovac
6	MF	AUS	Cameron Scerri
7	FW	AUS	Ivan Razumic
10	MF	ROU	Ionut-Casian Anghel
12	FW	AUS	Sonny Brimmer
15	MF	AUS	Eisay Adhanom
16	MF	AUS	Zachary Stosic

No.	Pos.	Nation	Player
19	FW	AUS	Lochlann Mcgrath
20	FW	AUS	Angus Chapman
25	MF	AUS	Marcus Peretin
27	FW	AUS	Luke Zivcic
33	GK	AUS	Alexander Mazzaferro
34	DF	AUS	Matthew Stosic
35	DF	AUS	George Elliss
37	DF	AUS	Spencer Hand
55	DF	JPN	Shun Nakamura
—	GK	AUS	Ryan Schorback
—	FW	PNG	Tommy Semmy

== Presidential history ==
Name	Years
Mirko Hrkač	1967–1968
Aldo Siketa	1969–1970
Vinko Radojevic	1971–1972
Aldo Siketa	1973
Mirko Hrkač	1974
Vinko Radojević	1975
Ivan Mrkogača	1976–1977
Pero Juran	1978
Mirko Hrkač	1979–1981
Vinko Radojević	1982

Name	Years
Marijan Demo	1982
Ivan Mrkogača	1983
Martin Groher	1984–1985
George Steinbruckner	1986
Martin Groher	1986–1987
Marijan Demo	1988
Mirko Hrkač	1989
Drago Vlahović	1990
Nikola Jurčić	1990
Stjepan Horvat	1991–1992

Name	Years
Pejo Marić	1993
Stjepan Horvat	1994
Steve Perinac	1995
Stjepan Horvat	1996
Drago Ćosić	1997–1998
Branko Matijević	1999
Duro Tilinger	2000–2003
Vlado Džajkić	2004
Ivan Perše	2005–2006
Stanko Demo	2007–2008

Name	Years
Josip Žilić	2009–2011
Daniel Deša	2012–2013
Božo Sesar	2013
Ivi Deak	2014
Andro Jurković	2015
Vlado Džajkić	2016–2018
John Didulica	2019–2021
Tom Trupković	2021–2023
Tom Pausak	2023–

== Managerial history ==
Name	Years
Andrija Macokatić	1968
Pajo Drenovac	1968–1969
Steve Horvat	1970–1971
Pajo Drenovac	1972
Ivan Roso	1973–1976
Mate Parmac	1977–1978
Ivan Roso	1979
Dušan Saba	1980
Mate Parmac	1980–1981
Joe Parks	1982
Mate Parmac	1983–1986
Andrija Albert	1986

Name	Years
Mate Parmac	1986–1988
Josip Spoljar	1989
Andrija Albert	1989
Mate Parmac	1990
Branko Culina	1990–1992
Tony Vrzina	1993
Bogdan Bonk	1994
Richard Sobczyk	1995
Eddie Kovačev	1995
Steve Radojević	1996
Mate Božić	1997
Adrian Begg	1997

Name	Years
Eddie Kuzman	1998
David O'Connor	1998
John Didulica	1999
Kenny Prior	2000
Robert Noggler	2000–2001
John Hrkac	2002
Robert Noggler	2003–2004
Robert Krajacic	2005–2006
Ian Williamson	2007
Eddie Krncevic	2007
Vinko Buljubašić	2008–2010
Ante Skoko	2011–2012

Name	Years
Mario Jurjević	2013
Ante Skoko	2013
Ante Šarčević	2014
Ante Skoko	2014
Micky Čolina	2014–2017
Luciano Trani	2018
James Coutts	2018–2019
Željko Gagula	2020–2021
Stuart Begg	2021–2023
Tomi Gavran	2023
Joey Didulica	2024
Stuart Begg	2024-

== Hall of Fame ==
North Geelong Warriors inaugural Hall of Fame inductees 30 June 2007 (40th anniversary gala):

- Jure Hecimovic
- Miro Kurtovic
- Steve Horvat Snr
- Steve Vuckovic
- Ivan Dula
- Zeljko Dula
- Zdenko Brkljacic
- Ivan Ivanovic
- Frank Simovic
- Drago Krajina
- Robert Cosic
- Ivan Smoljko
- David Cervinski
- Steve Horvat
- John Didulica
- Bogdan Bonk
- Richie O'Sullivan

Hall of Fame inductees 11 November 2017 (50th anniversary gala)

- Adrian Cervinski
- Ante Deak
- Josip Skoko
- Joey Didulica
- Mijo Trupkovic

== Honours ==
=== State ===
Tier 1:

- Victorian Premier League/ NPL Victoria Champions 1992
- Victorian Premier League/ NPL Victoria Minor Premiers 1992
- Victorian Premier League Finalists (Playoffs) 1992, 1993

Tier 2:

- Victorian State League Division 1 Champions 1991
- National Premier Leagues Victoria 2 Runners-up 2022
- National Premier Leagues Victoria Promotion Relegation Playoff Winners 2016
- National Premier Leagues Victoria 2 West Runners-up 2016
- National Premier Leagues Victoria 1 Runners-up 2014

Tier 3:

- Victorian Premier League 2 Champions 2025
- Victorian State League Division 2 North-West Champions (2): 2005, 2009
- Victorian League Division 2 Champions 1989

Tier 5:

- Metropolitan League Division 4 Runners-up 1983

Tier 7:

- Victorian Provisional League Division 2 Champions 1981

Tier 8:

- Victorian Provisional League Division 3 Champions 1980

Cups

- Victorian State League Cup Runners-up 1991
- Victorian Provisional League Cup Champions 1981

=== Other ===
- Geelong Advertiser Cup/Geelong Community Cup Champions (23): 1985, 1986, 1989, 1991, 1992, 1993, 1994, 1995, 1996, 1997, 2001, 2003, 2004, 2005, 2006, 2007, 2011, 2012, 2013, 2014, 2022, 2023, 2024
- Geelong Advertiser Cup/Geelong Community Cup Runners-up (6): 1988, 1990, 1998, 2000, 2002, 2021, 2025
- Australian-Croatian Soccer Tournament Champions 2014
- Australian-Croatian Soccer Tournament Runners-up 2018
- Victorian Croatian Cup Champions (6): 2004, 2014, 2015, 2021, 2022, 2023
- Ballarat, Geelong and Districts Soccer Association/Western Victoria Soccer Association Champions (13): 1973, 1974, 1976, 1977, 1978, 1984, 1985, 1986, 1987, 1988, 1995, 2002, 2003

=== Individual honours ===
- Victorian Premier League Gold Medal – VPL Player of the Year
  - 1992 – Bogdan Bonk
  - 1994 – Josip Skoko
- Victorian Premier League Jim Rooney Medal – Grand Final Man of the Match
  - 1992 – David Cervinski
- Bill Fleming Medal – Media voted VPL Player of the Year
  - 1993 – David Cervinski
- Victorian Premier League Coach of the Year
  - 1992 – Branko Culina
- National Premier Leagues Victoria 2 Coach of the Year
  - 2014 – Micky Colina
  - 2022 – Stuart Begg
- National Premier Leagues Victoria 2 Golden Boot
  - 2022 - Caleb Mikulić
- National Premier Leagues Victoria 2 Goalkeeper of the Year
  - 2022 - Hamish Flavell
- Victorian Premier League 2 Coach of the Year
  - 2025 - Stuart Begg
- Victorian Premier League 2 Player of the Year
  - 2025 - Anthony Banovac
- Victorian Premier League Under 21 Player of the Year
  - 1994 – Josip Skoko
- Weinstein Medal Junior Player of the Year
  - 1992 – Josip Skoko
  - 2005 – Matthew Spiranovic
- State League Division Two North West Best and Fairest
  - 2004 - Richie O’Sullivan
  - 2005 - Mijo Trupkovic
- State League Division Two North West Golden Boot
  - 2003 - Miro Stosic
  - 2005 - Adrian Cervinski
- Victorian League Division Two Best and Fairest
  - 1988 - Frank Simovic
- Metropolitan League Division Four Best and Fairest
  - 1983 - Drago Krajina

=== Women's Honours ===
- Victorian Women's State League Division 2 North West Champions 2013
- Victorian Women's State League Division 3 North West Runners-Up 2001
- Australian-Croatian Soccer Tournament Champions (5) 2005, 2010, 2015, 2022, 2024
- Australian-Croatian Soccer Tournament Runners-up (4) 2006, 2008, 2009, 2013
- Geelong Advertiser Cup/Geelong Community Cup Champions (1) 2025

== Divisional history ==
- Victorian Premier League 1 2026
- Victorian Premier League 2 2025
- Victorian Premier League 1 2024
- National Premier Leagues Victoria 2023
- National Premier Leagues Victoria 2 2018–2022
- National Premier Leagues Victoria 2017
- National Premier Leagues Victoria 2 2016
- National Premier Leagues Victoria 2015
- National Premier Leagues Victoria 1 2014
- Victorian State League Division 1 2010–2013
- Victorian State League 2 North-West 2008–2009
- Victorian State League Division 1 2006–2007
- Victorian State League 2 North-West 2000–2005
- Victorian State League Division 1 1998–1999
- Victorian Premier League 1992–1997
- Victorian State League Division 1 1991
- Victorian League Division 1 1990
- Victorian League Division 2 1985–1989
- Metropolitan League Division 2 1984
- Metropolitan League Division 4 1982–1983
- Victorian Provisional League 2 1981
- Victorian Provisional League 3 1979–1980
- Western Victoria Soccer Association 1975–1978
- Ballarat, Geelong and District Soccer Association 1973–1974
- Victorian Provisional League 1972
- Ballarat, Geelong and District Soccer Association First Division 1969–71
- Ballarat, Geelong and District Soccer Association Second Division 1968

== All-time record 1967–2026 ==
Season	League	Position
1967	Club Formed	
1968	BALLARAT, GEELONG & DISTRICT SOCCER ASSOCIATION DIVISION 2	4th
1969	BALLARAT, GEELONG & DISTRICT SOCCER ASSOCIATION DIVISION 1	6th
1970	BALLARAT, GEELONG & DISTRICT SOCCER ASSOCIATION DIVISION 1	4th
1971	BALLARAT, GEELONG & DISTRICT SOCCER ASSOCIATION DIVISION 1	4th
1972	VICTORIAN PROVISIONAL LEAGUE	Disqualified — crowd disturbances
1973	BALLARAT, GEELONG & DISTRICT SOCCER ASSOCIATION DIVISION 1	CHAMPIONS
1974	BALLARAT, GEELONG & DISTRICT SOCCER ASSOCIATION DIVISION 1	CHAMPIONS
1975	WESTERN VICTORIA SOCCER ASSOCIATION	RUNNERS-UP
1976	WESTERN VICTORIA SOCCER ASSOCIATION	CHAMPIONS
1977	WESTERN VICTORIA SOCCER ASSOCIATION	CHAMPIONS
1978	WESTERN VICTORIA SOCCER ASSOCIATION	CHAMPIONS
1979	VICTORIAN PROVISIONAL LEAGUE 3	3rd
1980	VICTORIAN PROVISIONAL LEAGUE 3	CHAMPIONS
1981	VICTORIAN PROVISIONAL LEAGUE 2	CHAMPIONS
1982	METROPOLITAN LEAGUE DIVISION 4	4th
1983	METROPOLITAN LEAGUE DIVISION 4	RUNNERS-UP
1984	METROPOLITAN LEAGUE DIVISION 2	12th
1985	VICTORIAN LEAGUE DIVISION 2	3rd
1986	VICTORIAN LEAGUE DIVISION 2	4th
1987	VICTORIAN LEAGUE DIVISION 2	4th
1988	VICTORIAN LEAGUE DIVISION 2	3rd
1989	VICTORIAN LEAGUE DIVISION 2	CHAMPIONS
1990	VICTORIAN LEAGUE DIVISION 1	7th
1991	VICTORIAN STATE LEAGUE DIVISION 1	CHAMPIONS
1992	VICTORIAN PREMIER LEAGUE	1st/PREMIERS
	Finals	CHAMPIONS
1993	VICTORIAN PREMIER LEAGUE	3rd
1994	VICTORIAN PREMIER LEAGUE	7th
1995	VICTORIAN PREMIER LEAGUE	7th
1996	VICTORIAN PREMIER LEAGUE	9th
1997	VICTORIAN PREMIER LEAGUE	13th Relegated
1998	VICTORIAN STATE LEAGUE DIVISION 1	9th
1999	VICTORIAN STATE LEAGUE DIVISION 1	12th Relegated
2000	VICTORIAN STATE LEAGUE DIVISION 2 NORTH-WEST	9th
2001	VICTORIAN STATE LEAGUE DIVISION 2 NORTH-WEST	7th
2002	VICTORIAN STATE LEAGUE DIVISION 2 NORTH-WEST	6th
2003	VICTORIAN STATE LEAGUE DIVISION 2 NORTH-WEST	7th
2004	VICTORIAN STATE LEAGUE DIVISION 2 NORTH-WEST	6th
2005	VICTORIAN STATE LEAGUE DIVISION 2 NORTH-WEST	CHAMPIONS
2006	VICTORIAN STATE LEAGUE DIVISION 1	4th
2007	VICTORIAN STATE LEAGUE DIVISION 1	11th Relegated
2008	VICTORIAN STATE LEAGUE DIVISION 2 NORTH-WEST	3rd
2009	VICTORIAN STATE LEAGUE DIVISION 2 NORTH-WEST	CHAMPIONS
2010	VICTORIAN STATE LEAGUE DIVISION 1	8th
2011	VICTORIAN STATE LEAGUE DIVISION 1	6th
2012	VICTORIAN STATE LEAGUE DIVISION 1	4th
2013	VICTORIAN STATE LEAGUE DIVISION 1	10th
2014	NATIONAL PREMIER LEAGUES VICTORIA 1	RUNNERS-UP
2015	NATIONAL PREMIER LEAGUES VICTORIA	12th Relegated
2016	NATIONAL PREMIER LEAGUES VICTORIA 2 WEST	RUNNERS-UP
2017	NATIONAL PREMIER LEAGUES VICTORIA	14th Relegated
2018	NATIONAL PREMIER LEAGUES VICTORIA 2 WEST	3rd
2019	NATIONAL PREMIER LEAGUES VICTORIA 2 WEST	5th
2020	NATIONAL PREMIER LEAGUES VICTORIA 2	N/A (Season cancelled)
2021	NATIONAL PREMIER LEAGUES VICTORIA 2	7th (season cancelled)
2022	NATIONAL PREMIER LEAGUES VICTORIA 2	RUNNERS-UP
2023	NATIONAL PREMIER LEAGUES VICTORIA	14th Relegated
2024	VICTORIAN PREMIER LEAGUE 1	14th Relegated
2025	VICTORIAN PREMIER LEAGUE 2	CHAMPIONS
2026	VICTORIAN PREMIER LEAGUE 1	9th

== See also ==
- Australian football (soccer) league system
- Geelong Regional Football Association
- List of Croatian soccer clubs in Australia
