= Elcho Park =

Soccer facility

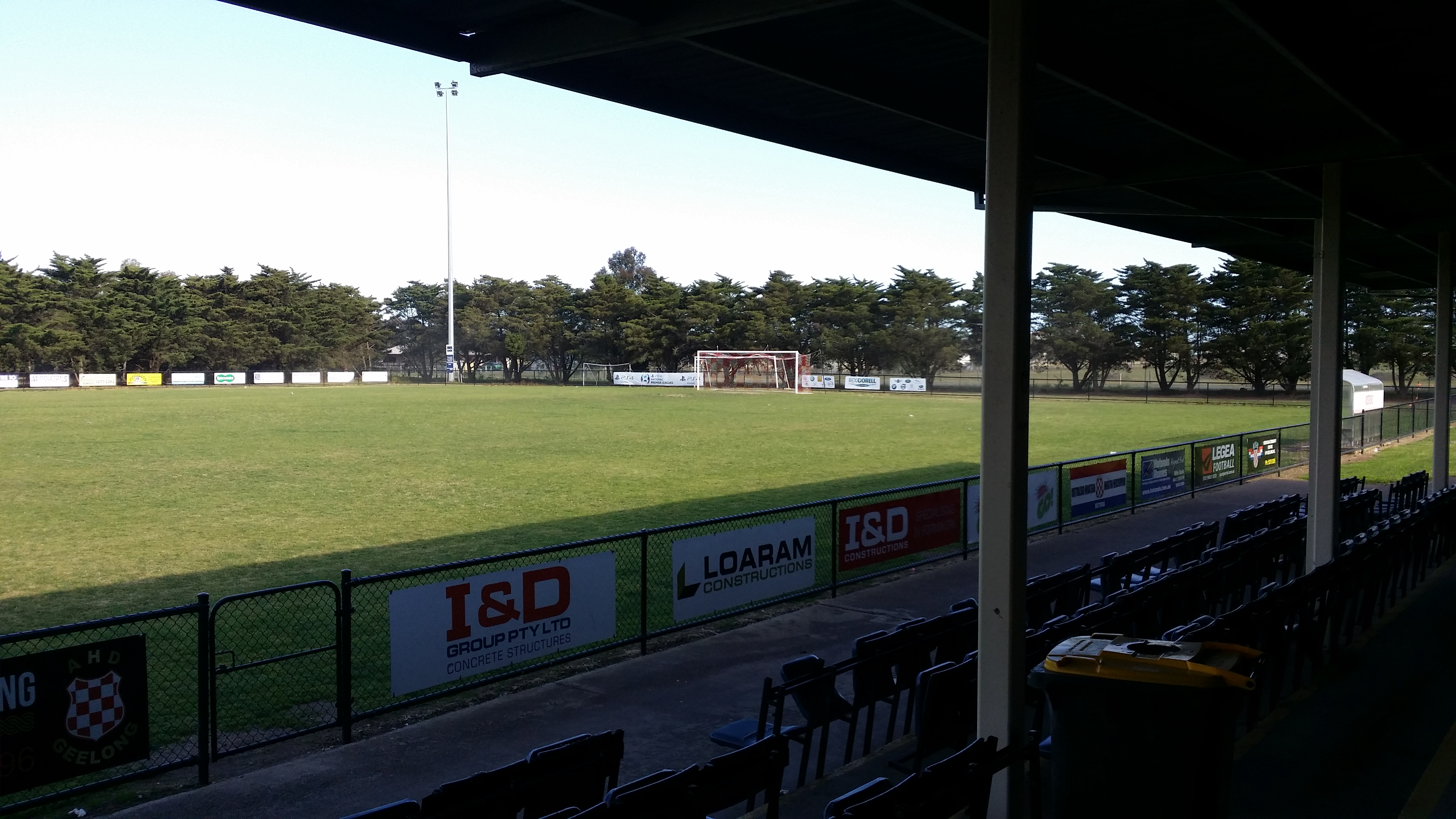
- Interactive map of Elcho Park
- Location: Lara, Victoria
- Coordinates: 38.029943°S 144.359434°E
- Owner: Australian Croatian Soccer Association of Geelong
- Operator: Australian Croatian Soccer Association of Geelong
- Capacity: 5,000 (Venue Capacity); 200 (Seating Capacity)
- Surface: Grass

Construction
- Opened: 1986

Tenant
- North Geelong Warriors FC

Website
- https://www.ngwfc.com.au/

Elcho Park is a soccer facility located on Gibbons Road in Lara, Victoria, a northern suburb of Geelong.

It is owned privately by the Australian Croatian Soccer Association Geelong. The tenants of the facility are National Premier Leagues Victoria side North Geelong Warriors FC.

North Geelong Warriors played their first season out of Elcho Park in 1986. The first competitive league game at the venue was a 3–3 draw between North Geelong and Essendon City on 29 March 1986.

The main grandstand, which is situated between the clubrooms and the pitch, seats about 200 people. The total capacity of the facility is much larger, with an abundance of standing room all around the main pitch.

In addition to the main pitch, there is also pitch 2 and pitich 3 (both grass) and over 100 parking spaces inside the facility.

In 2015, it was announced that the facility would be receiving $283,000 in council and state funding to upgrade the change rooms as part of a $1.1 million development that included two female change rooms. It was the first time the privately owned facility had been granted public funds.

In 2022, the Geelong Council granted the club $47,000 to contribute to the help maintenance cost for the 3 pitches for the year.

In 2024, North Geelong Warriors Football Club received $255,000 to upgrade pitch lighting on pitch one allowing for elite level night football at Elcho Park.
