= Surf Coast FC =

- Full name: Surf Coast Football Club
- Nicknames: Coast, Coasters
- Founded: 2001
- Ground: Banyul Warri Reserve
- Capacity: 500
- League: Victorian State League 3 North/West
- 2024: Champions (VSL 4 West)
- Website: https://www.surfcoastfc.com/
Home colours	Away colours

Surf Coast Football Club is an Australian semi-professional association football (soccer) club based in the Victorian seaside town of Torquay. Founded in 2001, the club gained entry into the competitive state system in 2008. Following successive promotions in 2024 and 2025, Surf Coast now competes in the Victorian State League Division 2, the fifth tier of Victorian football.

After painfully missing out on promotion in 2023 by one point, Surf Coast achieved the first promotion in its history in 2024, winning the State League 4 West championship. Surf Coast finished in 2nd place in 2025, confirming back-to-back promotions on the last day of the season, with a 3-1 win over Heidelberg Eagles. Attacker John Pykett took out the league golden boot award with 21 goals. With the effort, Pykett took his total to 75 goals across three seasons with the Coasters.

== Notable players ==
- Thomas Dunn (GK) Melbourne Heart 2011/12
- Harrison Jablonski Central Coast Mariners U20/ Australia U17

== Honours ==
- Victorian State League Division 4 West| (seventh tier)

Champions 2024 (promoted)

- Provisional League Division Two North-West/Victorian State League Division 4 West (sixth tier)

Runners-up (1): 2010 (promoted)
Third place (1): 2016

- Provisional League Division Three North-West (seventh tier)

Runners-up (1): 2009 (promoted)

== See also ==
- Geelong Regional Football Association
