= Geelong Rangers FC =

- Full name: Geelong Rangers Football Club
- Nicknames: Rangers, Dark Blues
- Founded: 1955
- Ground: Myers Reserve, Bell Post Hill, Victoria
- President: Tim Santalucia
- Coach: Michael Bothwell and Troy Hardy
- League: State League 2 Nth-West
- Website: https://geelongrangersfc.com/
Home colours	Away colours

Geelong Rangers Football Club is an Australian soccer club based in Geelong, Australia. The club currently competes in the Victorian State League Division 2 North-West, the fifth division of the Australian soccer league system.

== History ==
The club was started in 1955 by Bill Dorris Snr, Bob Barclay and John Barr under the name Geelong Scottish.

Their first home ground was cleared out of the waste ground and scrub at Hamlyn Park in Hamlyn Heights.

In early 1960's, the club expanded to two teams, the second team being named Hamlyn Rangers.

In 1975, the club moved to its current ground at Myers Reserve.

Geelong Rangers claimed the 2008 Victorian State League Division 3 championship with 43 points, five points clear of second placed Sydenham Park, and were promoted to the Victorian State League Division 2 for the 2009 season.

Upon the club's relegation from the Victorian State League Division 2 North-West to the Victorian State League Division 3 North-West in 2010, the club appointed former South African footballer Dale Harris as the first-team coach.

Rangers finished the 2011 season in bottom place of the Victorian State League Division 3 table and were relegated to Victorian Provisional League Division 1 North-West for the 2012 season.

The club debuted in the FFV State Knockout Cup in the 2012 tournament, where Rangers defeated Warrnambool Wolves in a 5–2 home victory in a second round fixture on 17 March.

== Record ==
Year	Division	Position	Points	Goal difference	Top goalscorers
2005	Victorian Provisional League Division 1 North-West	1st	47	+29	(Australia) Troy Hardy 22 (Australia) David Valys 9
2006	Victorian State League Division 3 North-West	5th	32	+1	(Australia) Troy Hardy 14 (Australia) Darren McCallum 5
2007	Victorian State League Division 3 North-West	7th	29	-3	(Australia) Troy Hardy 12 (Australia) Drew Corry 5 (Australia) David Valys 5
2008	Victorian State League Division 3 North-West	1st	43	+20	(Australia) Troy Hardy 20 (England) James Blackburn 18
2009	Victorian State League Division 2 North-West	8th	25	-5	(Australia) Troy Hardy 11 (England) James Blackburn 10
2010	Victorian State League Division 2 North-West	12th	8	-54	(Australia) Steven Perinac 3 (Australia) Daniel Early 1 (Australia) Ryan Calder 1
2011	Victorian State League Division 3 North-West	12th	10	-52	(England) James Blackburn 7 (Australia) David Valys 3
2012	Victorian Provisional League Division 1 North-West	5th	39	+32	(England) James Blackburn 27
2013	Victorian State League Division 4 West	3rd	44	+25	(Australia) Andrew Husband 7
2014	Victorian State League Division 3 North-West	7th	26	-4	(England) Jack Banks 4
2015	Victorian State League Division 3 North-West	10th	20	-13	(Australia) Thomas Robb 5
2016	Victorian State League Division 3 North-West	1st	50	+25	(Australia) Arran Maclean 9 (England) James Blackburn 9

== Honours ==
- Victorian State League Division 3 North-West: 2008, 2016
- Victorian Metropolitan League Division 3: 1984
- Victorian Metropolitan League Division 4: 1983
- Victorian Provisional League Division 1 North-West: 2005
- Geelong Advertiser Cup/Geelong Community Cup: 1987, 2009, 2019
- FFV State Knockout Cup: Zone Semi-Finals (2012)

== International representatives ==
=== Scotland ===
- Frank Munro, member of the Scotland national football team

== See also ==
- Geelong Regional Football Association
- Football Victoria
