= 2016 Football Federation Victoria season =

Football Federation Victoria
- Season: 2016

The 2016 Football Federation Victoria season was the third season under the new competition format for state-level football (soccer) in Victoria. The competition consisted of seven divisions across the state of Victoria.

== League Tables ==
=== 2016 National Premier Leagues Victoria ===
NPL Victoria
- Season: 2016
- Champions: South Melbourne
- Premiers: Bentleigh Greens
- Relegated: Richmond; Northcote City; Melbourne Victory Youth
- Top goalscorer: Milos Lujic (27 goals)

The 2016 National Premier Leagues Victoria season was played over 26 rounds. The overall premier of this division qualified for the 2016 National Premier Leagues finals series, and competed with the other state federation champions in a final knockout tournament to decide the National Premier Leagues champion for 2016.

Pos	Team	Pld	W	D	L	GF	GA	GD	Pts	Qualification or relegation
1	Bentleigh Greens	26	18	5	3	61	22	+39	59	2016 National Premier Leagues Finals
2	Heidelberg United	26	17	5	4	59	26	+33	53 (Note: Heidelberg United had three points deducted for misconduct in the 2015 season.)	2016 Victoria Finals
3	South Melbourne (C)	26	18	2	6	64	39	+25	53 (Note: South Melbourne had three points deducted for misconduct in the 2016 season.)	2016 Victoria Finals
4	Oakleigh Cannons	26	14	5	7	48	36	+12	47	2016 Victoria Finals
5	Green Gully	26	13	5	8	42	30	+12	44	2016 Victoria Finals
6	Hume City	26	13	4	9	47	25	+22	43	2016 Victoria Finals
7	Pascoe Vale	26	11	4	11	38	36	+2	37	
8	Avondale FC	26	10	5	11	37	42	−5	35	
9	Melbourne Knights	26	9	4	13	30	51	−21	31	
10	Port Melbourne	26	7	5	14	26	38	−12	26	
11	Bulleen Lions	26	5	10	11	21	32	−11	25	
12	Richmond (R)	26	5	8	13	37	58	−21	23	2016 relegation play-offs
13	Northcote City (R)	26	5	5	16	27	58	−31	20	Relegation to the 2017 NPL Victoria 2
14	Melbourne Victory Youth (R)	26	3	1	22	24	68	−44	4 (Note: Melbourne Victory Youth had six points deducted for misconduct in the 2016 season.)	Relegation to the 2017 NPL Victoria 2

Source: foxsportspulse.com
Rules for classification: 1) points; 2) goal difference; 3) number of goals scored.
(C) Champions; (R) Relegated

==== Finals ====
Elimination Finals
4	Oakleigh Cannons	5
5	Green Gully	2
3	South Melbourne	3
6	Hume City	0

Semi-finals
1	Bentleigh Greens	1
4	Oakleigh Cannons	3
2	Heidelberg United	1
3	South Melbourne	2

Final
3	South Melbourne	3
4	Oakleigh Cannons	2

==== Promotion/relegation play-off ====
West vs East			Promotion/relegation play-off
			12	Richmond SC	0
W2	North Geelong Warriors	4	W2	North Geelong Warriors	4
E2	Dandenong Thunder	1

=== 2016 National Premier Leagues Victoria 2 ===
==== West ====
NPL Victoria 2 West
- Season: 2016
- Promoted: St Albans Saints; North Geelong Warriors
- Top goalscorer: Atilla Ofli (32 goals)

The 2016 National Premier Leagues Victoria 2 West was played over 28 rounds, with each team playing the teams in their conference twice and the other conference once. The top team at the end of the season was promoted to National Premier Leagues Victoria, and the second placed team entered the promotion play-off.

Pos	Team	Pld	W	D	L	GF	GA	GD	Pts	Qualification or relegation
1	St Albans Saints (P)	28	17	5	6	55	33	+22	56	Promotion to the 2017 NPL Victoria
2	North Geelong Warriors (P)	28	15	8	5	53	27	+26	53	2016 promotion play-offs
3	Melbourne City Youth	28	14	4	10	70	45	+25	46	
4	Whittlesea Ranges	28	13	7	8	60	54	+6	46	
5	Moreland Zebras	28	14	2	12	44	35	+9	44	
6	Ballarat Red Devils	28	12	4	12	57	51	+6	40	
7	Moreland City	28	10	4	14	44	52	−8	34	
8	Werribee City	28	9	6	13	47	55	−8	33	
9	Sunshine George Cross	28	7	6	15	38	57	−19	23	
10	Bendigo City	28	4	3	21	28	93	−65	15	

(P) Promoted

==== East ====
NPL Victoria 2 East
- Season: 2016
- Champions: Kingston City
- Promoted: Kingston City
- Top goalscorer: Brandon Barnes (41 goals)

The 2015 National Premier Leagues Victoria 2 East was played over 28 rounds, with each team playing the teams in their conference twice and the other conference once. The top team at the end of the season was promoted to National Premier Leagues Victoria, and the second placed team entered the promotion play-off.

Pos	Team	Pld	W	D	L	GF	GA	GD	Pts	Qualification or relegation
1	Kingston City (C, P)	28	21	3	4	65	32	+33	66	Promotion to the 2017 NPL Victoria
2	Dandenong Thunder	28	22	2	4	89	28	+61	65	2016 promotion play-offs
3	Brunswick City	28	12	10	6	47	31	+16	46	
4	Dandenong City	28	13	5	10	61	41	+20	44	
5	Box Hill United	28	13	5	10	49	42	+7	44	
6	Springvale White Eagles	28	12	4	12	52	43	+9	40	
7	Eastern Lions	28	12	3	13	43	49	−6	39	
8	Goulburn Valley Suns	28	11	4	13	44	46	−2	37	
9	Murray United	28	3	5	20	28	68	−40	14	
10	Nunawading City	28	1	0	27	20	112	−92	3	

(C) Champions; (P) Promoted

==== Grand Final ====
The NPL2 Season concluded with a single match between the winners of the leagues in the West and East sections, to determine the NPL2 Champion.

11 September 2016

Kingston City	3–2	St Albans Saints
	Source

Lakeside Stadium

=== 2016 Victoria State League 1 ===
==== North-West ====
Victorian State League 1 North-West
- Season: 2016
- Champions: Altona Magic
- Relegated: Cairnlea; Diamond Valley United
- Top goalscorer: Diellon Memishi (19 goals)

Pos	Team	Pld	W	D	L	GF	GA	GD	Pts	Qualification or relegation
1	Altona Magic (C)	22	16	5	1	57	21	+36	53	
2	Preston Lions	22	15	2	5	41	16	+25	47	
3	North Sunshine Eagles	22	16	3	3	47	24	+23	39	
4	Banyule City	22	10	3	9	41	31	+10	33	
5	Sydenham Park	22	9	5	8	46	36	+10	32	
6	Westgate FC	22	8	6	8	51	51	0	30	
7	Yarraville	22	7	5	10	32	36	−4	26	
8	Western Suburbs	22	8	2	12	30	44	−14	26	
9	Keilor Park	22	6	7	9	34	38	−4	25	
10	Altona East Phoenix	22	5	6	11	27	44	−17	21	
11	Cairnlea FC (R)	22	3	6	13	26	52	−26	15	Relegation to the 2017 State League 2
12	Diamond Valley United (R)	22	3	2	17	24	63	−39	11	Relegation to the 2017 State League 2

(C) Champions; (R) Relegated

==== South-East ====
Victorian State League 1 South-East
- Season: 2016
- Champions: Mornington
- Relegated: Berwick City; Frankston Pines
- Top goalscorer: Caleb Nicholes (19 goals)

Pos	Team	Pld	W	D	L	GF	GA	GD	Pts	Qualification or relegation
1	Mornington (C)	22	15	4	3	46	24	+22	49	
2	Malvern City	22	15	2	5	45	15	+30	47	
3	Clifton Hill	22	15	1	6	55	28	+27	46	
4	Casey Comets	22	12	7	3	37	23	+14	43	
5	Manningham United	22	12	3	7	43	35	+8	39	
6	Langwarrin	22	9	6	7	46	38	+8	33	
7	Warragul United	22	9	5	8	29	21	+8	32	
8	South Springvale	22	6	3	13	31	44	−13	21	
9	Morwell Pegasus	22	5	3	14	30	49	−19	18	
10	Mooroolbark	22	5	2	15	27	57	−30	17	
11	Berwick City (R)	22	4	4	14	31	54	−23	16	Relegation to the 2017 State League 2
12	Frankston Pines (R)	22	3	4	15	34	66	−32	13	Relegation to the 2017 State League 2

(C) Champions; (R) Relegated

=== 2016 Victoria State League 2 ===
==== North-West ====
Victorian State League 2 North-West
- Season: 2016
- Champions: Geelong
- Promoted: Geelong; Essendon Royals
- Relegated: Heidelberg Stars; Sunbury United FC
- Top goalscorer: Verdan Stojanovic (29 goals)

Pos	Team	Pld	W	D	L	GF	GA	GD	Pts	Qualification or relegation
1	Geelong (C, P)	22	16	3	3	46	21	+25	51	Promotion to the 2017 State League 1
2	Essendon Royals (P)	22	15	2	5	57	26	+31	47	Promotion to the 2017 State League 1
3	Altona City	22	13	3	6	43	22	+21	42	
4	Hoppers Crossing	22	11	3	8	39	23	+16	36	
5	Moreland United	22	11	3	8	46	40	+6	36	
6	Sporting Whittlesea	22	8	5	9	45	39	+6	29	
7	Fitzroy City	22	7	7	8	31	36	−5	28	
8	Corio	22	7	4	11	48	60	−12	25	
9	Hume United	22	8	1	13	40	60	−20	25	
10	Essendon United	22	5	6	11	31	47	−16	21	
11	Heidelberg Stars (R)	22	4	5	13	31	57	−26	17	Relegation to the 2017 State League 3
12	Sunbury United (R)	22	5	2	15	30	56	−26	17	Relegation to the 2017 State League 3

(C) Champions; (P) Promoted; (R) Relegated

==== South-East ====
Victorian State League 2 South-East
- Season: 2016
- Champions: St Kilda SC
- Promoted: St Kilda SC; Caulfield United Cobras
- Relegated: Sandringham; Noble Park United
- Top goalscorer: Antun Vulic (25 goals)

Pos	Team	Pld	W	D	L	GF	GA	GD	Pts	Qualification or relegation
1	St Kilda SC (C, P)	22	19	1	2	66	23	+43	58	Promotion to the 2017 State League 1
2	Caulfield United Cobras (P)	22	16	3	3	58	22	+36	51	Promotion to the 2017 State League 1
3	Old Scotch	22	15	3	4	53	28	+25	48	
4	Beaumaris	22	15	2	5	65	22	+43	47	
5	North Caulfield	22	11	4	7	51	37	+14	37	
6	Doveton	22	11	1	10	41	35	+6	34	
7	Seaford United	22	8	4	10	45	52	−7	28	
8	Doncaster Rovers	22	8	1	13	49	52	−3	25	
9	Peninsula Strikers	22	7	2	13	35	57	−22	23	
10	Heatherton United	22	5	5	12	22	58	−36	20	
11	Sandringham (R)	22	2	0	20	14	64	−50	6	Relegation to the 2017 State League 3
12	Noble Park United (R)	22	1	2	19	12	61	−49	5	Relegation to the 2017 State League 3

(C) Champions; (P) Promoted; (R) Relegated

=== 2016 Victoria State League 3 ===
==== North-West ====
Victorian State League 3 North-West
- Season: 2016
- Champions: Geelong Rangers
- Promoted: Geelong Rangers; Westvale SC
- Relegated: Western Eagles; Darebin United; Lalor United
- Top goalscorer: Aleksandar Dimitrijevic (20 goals)

Pos	Team	Pld	W	D	L	GF	GA	GD	Pts	Qualification or relegation
1	Geelong Rangers (C, P)	22	16	2	4	49	24	+25	50	Promotion to the 2017 State League 2
2	Westvale SC (P)	22	13	5	4	52	21	+31	44	Promotion to the 2017 State League 2
3	Williamstown SC	22	12	5	5	49	26	+23	41	
4	Upfield SC	22	10	6	6	46	34	+12	36	
5	Whittlesea United	22	9	9	4	43	34	+9	36	
6	La Trobe University	22	10	3	9	45	33	+12	33	
7	Melbourne City	22	8	3	11	38	57	−19	27	
8	Fawkner SC	22	8	2	12	36	49	−13	26	
9	Melbourne University	22	7	3	12	46	51	−5	24	
10	Western Eagles (R)	22	7	2	13	32	44	−12	23	Qualification to the 2016 relegation play-offs
11	Darebin United (R)	22	3	7	12	18	41	−23	16	Relegation to the 2017 State League 4
12	Lalor United (R)	22	3	5	14	30	69	−39	14	Relegation to the 2017 State League 4

(C) Champions; (P) Promoted; (R) Relegated

==== South-East ====
Victorian State League 3 South-East
- Season: 2016
- Champions: Mazenod United
- Promoted: Mazenod United; Eltham Redbacks
- Relegated: Ashburton United; Old Melburnians; Croydon City Arrows
- Top goalscorer: Andrew Mclean (18 goals)

Pos	Team	Pld	W	D	L	GF	GA	GD	Pts	Qualification or relegation
1	Mazenod United (C, P)	22	16	4	2	58	18	+40	52	Promotion to the 2017 State League 2
2	Eltham Redbacks (P)	22	16	3	3	76	25	+51	51	Promotion to the 2017 State League 2
3	Brighton SC	22	12	3	7	56	32	+24	39	
4	Monbulk Rangers	22	12	2	8	53	26	+27	38	
5	South Yarra	22	10	4	8	42	34	+8	34	
6	Dingley Stars FC	22	10	4	8	43	44	−1	34	
7	Knox City	22	10	4	8	33	34	−1	34	
8	Middle Park	22	9	5	8	33	35	−2	32	
9	Riversdale	22	8	3	11	41	40	+1	27	
10	Ashburton United (R)	22	6	7	9	29	41	−12	25	Qualification to the 2016 relegation play-offs
11	Old Melburnians (R)	22	2	2	18	23	72	−49	8	Relegation to the 2017 State League 4
12	Croydon City (R)	22	0	1	21	9	95	−86	1	Relegation to the 2017 State League 4

(C) Champions; (P) Promoted; (R) Relegated

==== Promotion/relegation play-off ====
North vs West			North-West play-off
			10	Western Eagles	0
N2	Strathmore Split	2	N2	Strathmore Split	1
W2	Point Cook	1

South vs East			South-East play-off
			10	Ashburton United	1
S2	Springvale City	0	E2	Collingwood City	2
E2	Collingwood City	3

=== 2016 Women's National Premier League ===
(Victoria (state)) PS4 Women's National Premier League
- Season: 2016
- Champions: Calder United
- Premiers: Calder United
- Top goalscorer: Melina Ayres (22 goals)

The highest tier domestic football competition in Victoria for women is known for sponsorship reasons as the PS4 Women's National Premier League. This was the inaugural season of the NPL Women's format, replacing the previous Women's Premier League format. Only 8 of the 22 applicants were granted licences for the 2016 season, plus the Victorian women's team of the NTC. The 9 teams played a 24-round league competition.

Pos	Team	Pld	W	D	L	GF	GA	GD	Pts	Qualification or relegation
1	Calder United (C)	24	15	5	4	56	24	+32	50	Finals series
2	Alamein FC	24	15	2	7	64	30	+34	47	Finals series
3	Bulleen Lions	24	13	5	6	48	33	+15	44	Finals series
4	Greater Geelong Galaxy	24	12	4	8	38	27	+11	40	Finals series
5	Heidelberg United	24	10	4	10	39	48	−9	34	
6	Box Hill United	24	10	3	11	32	39	−7	33	
7	Victorian Women's NTC	24	7	1	16	34	66	−32	22	
8	Bayside United	24	5	4	15	27	46	−19	19	
9	Southern United	24	4	6	14	32	57	−25	18	

Source: foxsportspulse.com
Rules for classification: 1) points; 2) goal difference; 3) number of goals scored.
(C) Champions

==== Finals ====
Semi-finals
1	Calder United	2
2	Alamein FC	1
3	Bulleen Lions	0
4	Greater Geelong Galaxy	6

Preliminary Final
2	Alamein FC	1
4	Greater Geelong Galaxy(p)	1

Grand Final
1	Calder United	2
4	Greater Geelong Galaxy	1

== Cup Competitions ==
=== 2016 Dockerty Cup ===
Football Victoria soccer clubs competed in 2016 for the Dockerty Cup. The tournament doubled as the Victorian qualifiers for the 2016 FFA Cup, with the top four clubs progressing to the Round of 32. A total of 202 clubs entered the qualifying phase, with the clubs entering in a staggered format.

The Cup was won by Bentleigh Greens.

In addition to the two A-League clubs (Melbourne Victory and Melbourne City), the four semi-finalists (Bentleigh Greens, Green Gully, Hume City and Melbourne Knights) competed in the final rounds of the 2016 FFA Cup.
