= 2014 Dockerty Cup =

2014 FFV Dockerty Cup
Tournament details
- Country: Australia
- Teams: 190

Final positions
- Champions: Melbourne Knights

The 2014 Dockerty Cup was a football (soccer) knockout-cup competition held between men's clubs in Victoria, Australia in 2014, the annual edition of the Dockerty Cup. Victorian soccer clubs from the 5 State League Divisions, regional, metros and masters leagues - plus the 12 Clubs from the National Premier Leagues Victoria - competed for the Dockerty Cup trophy.

This knockout competition was won by Melbourne Knights, their 9th title.

The competition also served as qualifying rounds for the 2014 FFA Cup. In addition to the two Victorian A-League clubs, the four semi-finalists qualified for the final rounds of the 2014 FFA Cup, entering at the Round of 32.

Note: †–After extra time

== Format ==
Round	Clubs remaining	Winners from previous round	New entries this round	Main Match Dates
Round 1	190	none	70 (inc. 10 byes)	1–4 March
Round 2	160	40	72	7–9 March
Round 3	104	56	24	14–22 March
Round 4	64	40	24	20 March–15 April
Round 5	32	32	none	17 April–14 May
Round 6	16	16	none	28 May–4 June
Quarter-Finals	8	8	none	11–25 June
Semi-Finals	4	4	none	15–16 July
Final	2	2	none	31 August

== First round ==
A total of 70 teams took part in this stage of the competition, which was open to teams from the Victorian State League Division 5, regional, metros and masters leagues. Teams were seeded in terms of which round they would enter based on their division in 2013. Tiers in the table refer to the current (2014) division, after a major reorganization of the Victorian competition structure. A total of 10 teams were given a Bye to the Second Round. Matches in this round were played on 1–4 March 2014.

Tie no	Home team (tier)	Score	Away team (tier)
1	Old Trinity Grammarians (8)	3–0	Old Ivanhoe Grammarians (8)
2	Altona North (-)	1–1†	East Bentleigh (8)
East Bentleigh advance 4–5 on penalties.
3	Greenvale United (8)	w/o	Lyndale United (-)
Walkover for Greenvale United – Lyndale United removed.
4	Ringwood City (-)	w/o	Melton Phoenix (-)
Walkover for Melton Phoenix – Ringwood City removed.
5	Baxter (8)	0–5	Springvale City (8)
6	Dandenong Wolves (8)	3–1	Glen Waverley (8)
7	Wangaratta City (-)	0–5	Mazenod United (-)
Mazenod United removed from competition for fielding an ineligible player.
8	Old Mentonians (-)	1–0	Mitchell Rangers (8)
9	Brimbank Stallions (-)	2–1	Manningham United FC (-)
10	Fawkner (4)	0–5	Shepparton South (-)
11	Albert Park (8)	2–1	Swinburne University (8)
12	Kyneton District (8)	w/o	Endeavour Hills (8)
Walkover for Kyneton District – Endeavour Hills removed.
13	West Preston (-)	w/o	Reservoir Yeti (8)
Walkover for West Preston – Reservoir Yeti removed.
14	Whitehorse United (-)	w/o	Light United (8)
Walkover for Light United – Whitehorse United removed.
15	Yarra Jets (8)	0–14	Eltham Redbacks (8)

Tie no	Home team (tier)	Score	Away team (tier)
16	Twin City Wanderers (-)	w/o	Healesville (8)
Walkover for Twin City Wanderers – Healesville removed.
17	Spring Hills (8)	0–1	Parkville Panthers (-)
Parkville Panthers removed from competition for fielding an ineligible player.
18	Banksia Power (-)	w/o	Sebastopol Vikings (-)
Walkover for Sebastopol Vikings – Banksia Power removed.
19	Melbourne Tornado (-)	w/o	Boroondara Eagles (-)
Walkover for Boroondara Eagles – Melbourne Tornado removed.
20	Cobram Victory (-)	4–2	Old Xaverians (8)
21	Heidelberg Eagles (-)	2–3	Watsonia Heights (-)
22	Point Cook (-)	3–2	Laverton Park (-)
23	Keon Park (8)	3–4	Prahran City (8)
Prahran City removed from competition for fielding an ineligible player.
24	Sandown Lions (-)	w/o	Balmoral (8)
Walkover for Balmoral – Sandown Lions removed.
25	Truganina Hornets (8)	4–3	St Kevins Old Boys (8)
Truganina Hornets removed from competition for fielding an ineligible player.
26	Mill Park (8)	2–0	RMIT (-)
27	Northern United (8)	w/o	Oak Park (8)
Walkover for Oak Park – Northern United removed.
28	Melbourne City (-)	4–1	Montrose (8)
29	Meadow Park Eagles (-)	w/o	Melbourne Lions (-)
Walkover for Meadow Park Eagles – Melbourne Lions removed.
30	Lillydale Eagles (8)	w/o	Sporting Carlton (8)
Walkover for Lillydale Eagles – Sporting Carlton removed.

- Bye–Brighton Firsts, Bundoora United, Chelsea, Harrisfield Hurricanes, Keilor Wolves, Kings Domain, Lara, Noble Park, Parkmore, White Star Dandenong.

== Second round ==
A total of 112 teams took part in this stage of the competition. 72 Clubs from the clubs from the Victorian State League Division 4 and Division 3 entered into the competition at this stage. Teams were seeded in terms of which round they would enter based on their division in 2013. Tiers in the table refer to the current (2014) division. Matches in this round were played on 7–9 March 2014.

Tie no	Home team (tier)	Score	Away team (tier)
1	Melbourne City (-)	1–0	Old Melburnians (6)
2	Sebastopol Vikings (-)	w/o	Moreland United (5)
Walkover for Sebastopol Vikings – Moreland United removed.
3	Meadow Park Eagles (-)	3–2	Albert Park (8)
4	Corio (5)	1–1†	Essendon United (6)
Corio advance 6–5 on penalties.
5	Waverley Wanderers (7)	1–2	Banyule City (5)
6	Altona City (6)	w/o	Brunswick Zebras (6)
Walkover for Altona City – Brunswick Zebras removed.
7	Rowville Eagles (7)	3–2	Maribyrnong Greens (7)
8	Western Eagles (6)	0–4	Westvale (5)
9	Oak Park (8)	w/o	Williamstown SC (6)
Walkover for University – Hucknall Town removed.
10	Lillydale Eagles (8)	w/o	Hoppers Crossing (7)
Walkover for Hoppers Crossing – Lillydale Eagles removed.
11	Spring Hills FC (-)	2–4†	Shepparton South (-)
12	Wangaratta City (-)	w/o	Knox City (6)
Walkover for Knox City – Wangaratta City removed.
13	Geelong Rangers (6)	2–0	Monash University (-)
14	Geelong (5)	w/o	Essendon Royals (6)
Walkover for Geelong – Essendon Royals removed.
15	South Yarra FC (6)	7–3	Collingwood City FC (7)
16	Parkmore FC (8)	4–0	Middle Park FC (6)
17	Whittlesea United (6)	5–1	Brimbank Stallions (-)
18	Bell Park (7)	4–2	Bundoora United (-)
19	FC Strathmore (7)	2–3	Skye United (7)
20	Sporting Whittlesea (5)	1–1†	Caulfield United Cobras (6)
Sporting Whittlesea advance 5–4 on penalties.
21	Mooroolbark (5)	w/o	Light United (8)
Walkover for Mooroolbark – Light United removed.
22	Epping City (7)	2–3	Elwood City (6)
23	Mill Park (8)	w/o	Upfield (7)
Walkover for Upfield – Mill Park removed.
24	Old Scotch (5)	4–0	Springvale City (8)
25	Seaford United (5)	1–1†	St. Kilda (-)
St. Kilda advance 3–5 on penalties.
26	Monbulk Rangers (6)	5–0	Balmoral (8)
27	North City Wolves (6)	0–3	Beaumaris (5)
28	Lara (8)	0–3	North Sunshine Eagles (5)

Tie no	Home team (tier)	Score	Away team (tier)
29	North Caulfield (5)	w/o	Yarraville (5)
Walkover for North Caulfield – Yarraville removed.
30	Cobram Victory (-)	w/o	Riversdale (6)
Walkover for Cobram Victory – Riversdale removed.
31	Sunbury United (4)	w/o	Hume United (5)
Walkover for Sunbury United – Hume United removed.
32	Frankston Pines (5)	6–0	Old Mentonians (-)
33	Kyneton District (8)	4–1	Greenvale United (8)
34	Peninsula Strikers (5)	1–2	Darebin United (7)
35	Endeavour United (7)	0–4	Eltham Redbacks (8)
36	Old Camberwell Grammarians (7)	w/o	Kings Domain (8)
Walkover for Old Camberwell Grammarians – HucknKings Domainwn removed.
37	Melbourne University (5)	6–0	Keon Park (8)
38	Harrisfield Hurricanes (8)	w/o	West Preston (-)
Walkover for West Preston – Harrisfield Hurricanes removed.
39	Northern Roosters (6)	3–0	Hampton Park United Sparrows (7)
40	Croydon City Arrows (7)	3–0	Brandon Park (7)
41	Northern Falcons (7)	1–3	East Brighton United (-)
42	Plenty Valley Lions (7)	7–2	Keilor Wolves (8)
43	Sandringham (6)	w/o	Lalor United (6)
Walkover for Lalor United – Sandringham removed.
44	Warragul United (5)	2–6	Nunawading City (5)
45	Twin City Wanderers (-)	9–0	Watsonia Heights (-)
46	White Star Dandenong (8)	w/o	Heatherton United (5)
Walkover for Heatherton United – White Star Dandenong removed.
47	Berwick City (5)	5–0	Old Trinity Grammarians (8)
48	Brighton SC Firsts (-)	w/o	Surf Coast (7)
Walkover for Surf Coast – Brighton SC Firsts removed.
49	Heidelberg Stars (5)	7–0	Point Cook (-)
50	Casey Comets (4)	13–0	Chelsea (8)
51	Cairnlea (4)	3–1	Noble Park (4)
52	St Kevins Old Boys SC	3–1	Boroondara Eagles (-)
53	Old Carey (6)	2–0†	Keysborough SC (7)
54	Melton Phoenix (-)	3–4	Ashburton United FC (6)
55	Bayside Argonauts (7)	w/o	Dandenong Wolves (8)
Walkover for Bayside Argonauts – Dandenong Wolves removed.
56	East Bentleigh (8)	0–2	Doncaster Rovers (4)

== Third round ==
A total of 80 teams took part in this stage of the competition. 24 Clubs from the Victorian State League Division 2 entered into the competition at this stage. Teams were seeded in terms of which round they would enter based on their division in 2013. Tiers in the table refer to the current (2014) division. Matches in this round were played on 14–22 March 2014.

Tie no	Home team (tier)	Score	Away team (tier)
1	Bell Park (7)	0–6	Heidelberg Stars (5)
2	Northern Roosters (6)	3–2†	Knox City FC (6)
3	Bayside Argonauts (7)	0–5	Ballarat Red Devils (2)
4	Cobram Victory (-)	w/o	Morwell Pegasus (4)
Walkover for Cobram Victory – Morwell Pegasus removed.
5	Shepparton South (-)	2–4	Frankston Pines (5)
6	Nunawading City (5)	4–2	Meadow Park Eagles (-)
7	Eltham Redbacks (8)	5–1	Old Camberwell Grammarians (7)
8	FC Clifton Hill (4)	2–1	Hoppers Crossing (7)
9	North Caulfield (5)	5–3	Kyneton District (8)
10	Altona City (6)	1–5	Moreland City (4)
11	Parkmore (8)	1–1†	St Kevins Old Boys
St Kevins Old Boys advance 2–4 on penalties.
12	Malvern City (4)	3–1	Williamstown SC (6)
13	Keilor Park (4)	5–0	Sebastopol Vikings (-)
14	Geelong (5)	1–3	Avondale Heights (3)
15	Surf Coast (7)	1–2	Berwick City (5)
16	Banyule City (5)	1–2	Sydenham Park (4)
17	North Sunshine Eagles (5)	4–1	Altona East Phoenix (4)
18	Upfield (7)	2–3	Westvale (5)
19	La Trobe University (5)	w/o	Brunswick City (3)
Walkover for Brunswick City – La Trobe University removed.
20	Sporting Whittlesea (5)	0–4	Sunbury United (4)

Tie no	Home team (tier)	Score	Away team (tier)
21	Fitzroy City (4)	1–3	Kingston City (3)
22	Melbourne University (5)	2–0	Monbulk Rangers (6)
23	Corio SC (5)	3–0	Langwarrin (4)
24	St. Kilda (-)	2–1†	Diamond Valley United (4)
25	Doncaster Rovers (4)	1–2	South Springvale (4)
26	Plenty Valley Lions (7)	2–1	Mooroolbark (5)
27	Springvale White Eagles (3)	5–3†	Ashburton United FC (6)
28	Melbourne City (-)	0–2	Elwood City (6)
29	East Brighton United ()	w/o	Whittlesea Ranges (3)
Walkover for Whittlesea Ranges – East Brighton United removed.
30	Westgate FC (4)	0–3	Mornington (4)
31	Darebin United (7)	0–6	Old Scotch (5)
32	Rowville Eagles (7)	0–2	Skye United (7)
33	Cairnlea (4)	7–0	West Preston (-)
34	Croydon City Arrows (7)	1–4	Doveton (5)
35	Heatherton United (5)	1–3	Twin City Wanderers (-)
36	Dandenong City (3)	4–4†	Preston Lions (4)
Preston Lions advance 2–4 on penalties.
37	Geelong Rangers (6)	w/o	Beaumaris (5)
Walkover for Beaumaris – Geelong Rangers removed.
38	Old Carey (6)	0–4	Noble Park United (4)
39	Casey Comets (4)	2–1	Lalor United (6)
40	Whittlesea United (6)	3–1	South Yarra FC (6)

== Fourth round ==
A total of 64 teams took part in this stage of the competition. 12 Clubs from the National Premier Leagues Victoria and 12 Clubs from the Victorian State League Division 1 entered into the competition at this stage. Teams were seeded in terms of which round they would enter based on their division in 2013. Tiers in the table refer to the current (2014) division. Matches in this round were played on 20 March – 15 April 2014.

Tie no	Home team (tier)	Score	Away team (tier)
1	Westvale (5)	7–2	Nunawading City (5)
2	Twin City Wanderers (-)	1–5	Avondale Heights (3)
3	Port Melbourne (2)	0–3	Northcote City (2)
4	Corio (5)	2–2†	Frankston Pines (5)
Frankston Pines advance 2–4 on penalties.
5	Beaumaris (5)	3–2	Heidelberg Stars (5)
6	Bulleen Lions (3)	3–1	Moreland City (4)
7	Oakleigh Cannons (2)	1–2	Werribee City (2)
8	Old Scotch (5)	0–4	Richmond (3)
9	Sydenham Park (4)	0–4	Keilor Park (4)
10	Doveton (5)	3–2	North Caulfield (5)
11	Box Hill United (3)	2–2†	North Sunshine Eagles (5)
North Sunshine Eagles advance 4–5 on penalties.
12	North Geelong Warriors (3)	0–2	Preston Lions (4)
13	Bentleigh Greens (2)	3–0	St. Kilda (-)
14	Brunswick City (3)	0–1	Elwood City (6)
15	Pascoe Vale (2)	0–1	South Springvale(4)
16	Hume City (2)	5–0	Casey Comets (4)

Tie no	Home team (tier)	Score	Away team (tier)
17	Clifton Hill (4)	1–2	St Albans Saints (3)
18	Noble Park United (4)	1–3	Mornington (4)
19	Berwick City (5)	3–2	Western Suburbs (4)
20	Dandenong Thunder (2)	2–1	Heidelberg United (2)
21	Skye United (7)	1–1†	Melbourne University (5)
Skye United advance 4–2 on penalties.
22	Kingston City (3)	0–1†	Moreland Zebras (3)
23	Melbourne Knights (2)	4–0	Whittlesea Ranges (3)
24	Plenty Valley Lions (7)	3–4	Eastern Lions (4)
25	Malvern City (4)	1–2	Sunbury United (4)
26	Fawkner Blues (4)	4–2	Eltham Redbacks (8)
27	Sunshine George Cross (3)	0–1	South Melbourne (2)
28	Cairnlea (4)	5–1	St Kevins Old Boys (-)
29	Green Gully (2)	2–1	Ballarat Red Devils (2)
30	Springvale White Eagles (3)	1–0	Altona Magic (4)
31	Northern Roosters (6)	0–1	Whittlesea United (6)
32	Southern Stars (4)	3–2	Cobram Victory (-)

== Fifth Round ==
A total of 32 teams took part in this stage of the competition. Matches in this round were played on 17 April – 14 May 2014.

Tie no	Home team (tier)	Score	Away team (tier)
1	Avondale Heights (3)	1–2	St Albans Saints (3)
2	South Springvale (4)	3–1	Cairnlea (4)
3	Bulleen Lions (3)	10–0	Westvale (5)
4	Preston Lions (4)	0–5	Werribee City (2)
5	Bentleigh Greens (2)	3–1	Moreland Zebras (3)
6	Dandenong Thunder (2)	3–1	Doveton (5)
7	Frankston Pines (5)	0–4	Green Gully (2)
8	Elwood City (6)	w/o	Northcote City (2)
Walkover for Northcote City – Elwood City removed.

Tie no	Home team (tier)	Score	Away team (tier)
9	Hume City (2)	8–0	Skye United (7)
10	Fawkner Blues (4)	1–0	Beaumaris (5)
11	Richmond (3)	2–1†	North Sunshine Eagles (5)
12	Berwick City (5)	1–4	South Melbourne (2)
13	Melbourne Knights (2)	2–1†	Mornington (4)
14	Southern Stars (4)	1–2†	Sunbury United (4)
15	Keilor Park (4)	0–0†	Eastern Lions (4)
Eastern Lions advance 2–4 on penalties.
16	Whittlesea United (6)	0–4	Springvale White Eagles (3)

== Sixth Round ==
A total of 16 teams took part in this stage of the competition. Matches in this round were played on 28 May – 4 June 2014.

Tie no	Home team (tier)	Score	Away team (tier)
1	Bulleen Lions (3)	0–1	Bentleigh Greens (2)
2	Dandenong Thunder (2)	0–1†	South Melbourne (2)
3	Fawkner Blues (4)	0–1	South Springvale (4)
4	Green Gully (2)	1–4	Melbourne Knights (2)

Tie no	Home team (tier)	Score	Away team (tier)
5	Werribee City (2)	1–2	Northcote City (2)
6	Richmond (3)	4–0	Sunbury United (4)
7	St Albans Saints (3)	4–1	Eastern Lions (4)
8	Springvale White Eagles (3)	0–6	Hume City (2)

== Quarter finals ==
A total of 8 teams took part in this stage of the competition. The four victorious teams in this round also qualified for the 2014 FFA Cup Round of 32. Matches in this round were played on 11–25 June 2014.

Tie no	Home team (tier)	Score	Away team (tier)
1	South Melbourne (2)	0–2	Melbourne Knights (2)
2	Hume City (2)	0–3	South Springvale (4)
3	Northcote City (2)	1–1†	St Albans Saints (3)
St Albans Saints advance 5–6 on penalties.
4	Richmond (3)	1–3	Bentleigh Greens (2)

== Semi finals ==
A total of four teams took part in this stage of the competition. The two victorious teams in this round qualified for the 2014 Dockerty Cup Final.

Tie no	Home team (tier)	Score	Away team (tier)
1	Melbourne Knights (2)	3–2	Bentleigh Greens (2)
2	St Albans Saints (3)	1–1 aet	South Springvale (4)
South Springvale advances 9–8 on penalties.

== Final ==
The final was played at the neutral venue of Lakeside Stadium on 31 August.

31 August	Melbourne Knights (2)	1–0 (a.e.t.)	South Springvale (4)	Lakeside Stadium
	Uskok 120+1'	Report
