= 2019 Football Victoria season =

Football Victoria
- Season: 2019

The 2019 Football Victoria season refers to the soccer competitions contested under the organisation of Football Victoria in 2019. Across seven senior men's and six senior women's divisions, this was the 111th season of organised soccer in Victoria and the sixth following the latest competition restructure in 2013.

Overall, the season was characterised by greater media attention and broadcasting efforts within the NPL, but was somewhat-marred by disciplinary issues at both the NPL and State League levels. The first year under FV's newly-rebranded name, it also saw further restructures to the men's competition structure, changes to the National Club Identity Policy, as well as expansion of the NPL junior boys leagues.

== League tables ==
=== 2019 NPL Victoria ===
NPL Victoria
- Season: 2019
- Champions: Bentleigh Greens
- Premiers: Heidelberg United
- Relegated: Kingston City; Pascoe Vale

The 2019 National Premier Leagues Victoria season was played over 26 rounds. As premiers, Heidelberg United qualified for the 2019 National Premier Leagues finals series, competing with the other state federation champions in a final knockout tournament to decide the National Premier Leagues 2019 champion.

Pos	Team	Pld	W	D	L	GF	GA	GD	Pts	Qualification or relegation
1	Heidelberg United	26	17	4	5	53	28	+25	55	2019 National Premier Leagues Finals
2	Oakleigh Cannons	26	13	6	7	45	32	+13	45	2019 Victorian Finals
3	Green Gully	26	12	8	6	55	40	+15	44	2019 Victorian Finals
4	Bentleigh Greens (C)	26	13	4	9	47	45	+2	43	2019 Victorian Finals
5	Hume City	26	12	5	9	41	37	+4	41	2019 Victorian Finals
6	Avondale FC	26	16	5	5	63	29	+34	35 (Note: Avondale FC had eighteen points deducted for licence breaches in the 2018 and 2019 seasons.)	2019 Victorian Finals
7	Dandenong City	26	10	5	11	42	47	−5	35	
8	South Melbourne	26	10	4	12	27	42	−15	34	
9	Port Melbourne	26	8	7	11	41	37	+4	31	
10	Melbourne Knights	26	10	4	12	35	42	−7	31 (Note: Melbourne Knights had three points deducted for misconduct in the 2019 season.)	
11	Altona Magic	26	9	2	15	43	51	−8	29	
12	Dandenong Thunder	26	6	6	14	44	70	−26	24	2019 relegation play-offs
13	Kingston City (R)	26	6	5	15	35	51	−16	23	Relegation to the 2020 NPL Victoria 2
14	Pascoe Vale (R)	26	6	3	17	33	53	−20	21	Relegation to the 2020 NPL Victoria 2

Source: sportstg.com
Rules for classification: 1) points; 2) goal difference; 3) number of goals scored.
(C) Champions; (R) Relegated

==== Finals ====
Elimination Finals
3	Oakleigh Cannons	2
6	Hume City	0
4	Green Gully	0
5	Bentleigh Greens	1

Semi-finals
2	Avondale FC	2
3	Oakleigh Cannons	0
1	Heidelberg United	1
5	Bentleigh Greens	2

Final
2	Avondale FC	1 (3)
5	Bentleigh Greens (p)	1 (4)

==== Promotion/relegation play-off ====
NPL 2 East vs West			Promotion/relegation play-off
			12	Dandenong Thunder	1
W2	Moreland Zebras	1	E2	Bulleen Lions	0
E2	Bulleen Lions (a.e.t.)	2

=== 2019 NPL Victoria 2 ===
NPL Victoria 2
- Season: 2019
- Champions: St Albans Saints
- Premiers: St Albans Saints (West), Eastern Lions (East)
- Relegated: Box Hill United, Ballarat City, Murray United, Springvale White Eagles, Geelong, Melbourne Victory Youth, Whittlesea Ranges, Melbourne City Youth,

The 2019 National Premier Leagues Victoria 2 season was played over 28 rounds with each team playing the teams in their conference twice and the other conference once. The top teams in each conference at the end of the season were promoted to National Premier Leagues Victoria, while the second-placed teams played-off to qualify for the promotion/relegation play-off with the 12th-placed team from the NPL.

==== NPL 2 West ====
Pos	Team	Pld	W	D	L	GF	GA	GD	Pts	Qualification or relegation
1	St Albans Saints (C, P)	28	17	4	7	58	30	+28	55	Promotion to NPL Victoria
2	Moreland Zebras	28	15	8	5	50	30	+20	53	2019 promotion play-offs
3	Werribee City	28	14	6	8	51	32	+19	48	
4	Moreland City	28	13	8	7	57	42	+15	44 (Note: Moreland City had three points deducted.)	
5	North Geelong Warriors	28	13	5	10	42	35	+7	44	
6	Brunswick City	28	11	7	10	50	44	+6	40	
7	Geelong (R)	28	10	6	12	39	43	−4	36	Relegation to NPL 3
8	Whittlesea Ranges (R)	28	10	6	12	36	49	−13	36	Relegation to NPL 3
9	Melbourne Victory Youth (R)	28	6	7	15	36	48	−12	25	Relegation to NPL 3
10	Ballarat City (R)	28	3	5	20	35	76	−41	14	Relegation to NPL 3

Source: sportstg.com
Rules for classification: 1) points; 2) goal difference; 3) goals scored.
(C) Champions; (P) Promoted; (R) Relegated

==== NPL 2 East ====
Pos	Team	Pld	W	D	L	GF	GA	GD	Pts	Qualification or relegation
1	Eastern Lions (P)	28	17	6	5	54	32	+22	57	Promotion to NPL Victoria
2	Bulleen Lions	28	16	5	7	55	39	+16	53	2019 promotion play-offs
3	Northcote City	28	15	2	11	46	40	+6	47	
4	Langwarrin	28	11	8	9	44	37	+7	41	
5	Manningham United	28	12	5	11	48	44	+4	41	
6	Goulburn Valley	28	10	6	12	55	52	+3	36	
7	Melbourne City Youth (R)	28	9	5	14	58	65	−7	32	Relegation to NPL 3
8	Murray United (R)	28	10	4	14	50	64	−14	31 (Note: Murray United had three points deducted for fielding an ineligible player in the U20 team in the 2018 season.)	Relegation to NPL 3
9	Box Hill United (R)	28	4	10	14	31	49	−18	22	Relegation to NPL 3
10	Springvale White Eagles (R)	28	4	7	17	26	70	−44	19	Relegation to NPL 3

Source: sportstg.com
Rules for classification: 1) points; 2) goal difference; 3) goals scored.
(P) Promoted; (R) Relegated

=== State League 1 ===
==== North-West ====
Pos	Team	Pld	W	D	L	GF	GA	GD	Pts	Qualification or relegation
1	Preston Lions	22	16	4	2	55	21	+34	52	Promotion to 2020 NPL Victoria 3
2	North Sunshine Eagles	22	15	3	4	47	30	+17	48	Promotion to 2020 NPL Victoria 3
3	Sydenham Park	22	14	4	4	38	21	+17	46	
4	Banyule City	22	10	4	8	24	34	−10	34	
5	Caroline Springs George Cross	22	10	3	9	35	36	−1	33	
6	Brimbank Stallions	22	10	1	11	43	37	+6	31	
7	Altona City	22	9	3	10	38	38	0	30	
8	Keilor Park	22	6	7	9	33	36	−3	25	
9	Yarraville	22	6	6	10	28	32	−4	24	
10	Clifton Hill	22	5	4	13	32	51	−19	19	
11	Essendon Royals	22	5	3	14	31	44	−13	18	
12	Whittlesea United	22	3	4	15	25	49	−24	13	

Source: sportstg.com
Rules for classification: 1) Points; 2) Goal difference; 3) Number of goals scored

==== South-East ====
Pos	Team	Pld	W	D	L	GF	GA	GD	Pts	Qualification or relegation
1	Nunawading City	22	15	5	2	63	19	+44	50	Promotion to 2020 NPL Victoria 3
2	Doveton	22	16	1	5	61	29	+32	49	Promotion to 2020 NPL Victoria 3
3	Malvern City	22	14	4	4	47	37	+10	46	
4	Richmond	22	11	5	6	46	33	+13	38	
5	Mornington	22	11	1	10	44	35	+9	34	
6	St Kilda	22	8	6	8	26	30	−4	30	
7	Casey Comets	22	9	2	11	42	48	−6	29	
8	Warragul United	22	8	3	11	35	37	−2	27	
9	Eltham Redbacks	22	7	3	12	28	38	−10	24	
10	Beaumaris	22	7	3	12	30	49	−19	24	
11	Caulfield United Cobras	22	5	4	13	33	45	−12	19	
12	Mazenod Victory	22	1	3	18	21	76	−55	6	

Source: sportstg.com
Rules for classification: 1) Points; 2) Goal difference; 3) Number of goals scored

=== State League 2 ===
==== North-West ====
Pos	Team	Pld	W	D	L	GF	GA	GD	Pts	Qualification or relegation
1	Fitzroy City	22	14	4	4	50	20	+30	46	Promotion to 2020 Victorian State League Division 1
2	Corio	22	13	5	4	44	26	+18	44	Promotion to 2020 Victorian State League Division 1
3	Epping City	22	13	4	5	44	17	+27	43	
4	Hoppers Crossing	22	12	6	4	46	21	+25	42	
5	Westgate	22	13	4	5	31	16	+15	40	
6	Albion Rovers	22	10	4	8	38	32	+6	34	
7	Geelong Rangers	22	8	4	10	36	40	−4	28	
8	Mill Park	22	5	6	11	29	41	−12	21	
9	Moreland United	22	6	3	13	27	51	−24	21	
10	Hume United	22	6	2	14	27	49	−22	20	
11	Western Suburbs	22	4	5	13	20	40	−20	17	
12	Altona East Phoenix	22	4	1	17	28	67	−39	13	

Source: sportstg.com
Rules for classification: 1) Points; 2) Goal difference; 3) Number of goals scored

==== South-East ====
Pos	Team	Pld	W	D	L	GF	GA	GD	Pts	Qualification or relegation
1	Boroondara-Carey Eagles	22	16	4	2	51	19	+32	52	Promotion to 2020 Victorian State League Division 1
2	South Springvale	22	12	6	4	42	26	+16	42	Promotion to 2020 Victorian State League Division 1
3	Berwick City	22	11	6	5	39	23	+16	39	
4	Brandon Park	22	11	5	6	44	34	+10	38	
5	Heatherton United	22	8	7	7	33	38	−5	31	
6	Monbulk Rangers	22	8	6	8	35	33	+2	30	
7	Peninsula Strikers Senior	22	8	4	10	41	40	+1	28	
8	Knox City	22	8	3	11	30	30	0	27	
9	North Caulfield Senior	22	8	3	11	42	46	−4	27	
10	Old Scotch	22	7	2	13	27	44	−17	23	
11	Mooroolbark	22	6	2	14	31	53	−22	20	
12	Doncaster Rovers	22	3	4	15	32	61	−29	13	

Source: sportstg.com
Rules for classification: 1) Points; 2) Goal difference; 3) Number of goals scored

=== State League 3 ===
==== North-West ====
Pos	Team	Pld	W	D	L	GF	GA	GD	Pts	Qualification or relegation
1	Lalor United FC (C, P)	22	17	2	3	60	26	+34	53	Promotion to Victorian State League Division 2
2	FC Strathmore (P)	22	17	2	3	62	29	+33	53	Promotion to Victorian State League Division 2
3	Williamstown	22	13	3	6	52	28	+24	42	
4	Fawkner SC	22	12	2	8	53	37	+16	38	
5	Upfield SC	22	12	0	10	41	31	+10	36	
6	Essendon United FC	22	9	3	10	35	33	+2	30	
7	Sunbury United	22	8	4	10	42	44	−2	28	
8	Craigieburn City	22	9	2	11	45	42	+3	29	
9	Western Eagles FC	22	6	6	10	29	37	−8	24	
10	Sebastopol Vikings	22	7	2	13	35	50	−15	23	
11	Point Cook	22	5	5	12	32	47	−15	20	
12	Westvale	22	1	1	20	10	92	−82	4	

Source: sportstg.com
Rules for classification: 1) points; 2) goal difference; 3) goals scored.
(C) Champions; (P) Promoted

==== South-East ====
Pos	Team	Pld	W	D	L	GF	GA	GD	Pts	Qualification or relegation
1	Collingwood City	22	17	2	3	60	16	+44	53	Promotion to 2020 Victorian State League Division 2
2	Skye United	22	15	2	5	57	28	+29	47	Promotion to 2020 Victorian State League Division 2
3	Whitehorse United	22	15	2	5	55	36	+19	47	
4	South Yarra	22	10	4	8	41	34	+7	34	
5	Elwood City	22	10	4	8	38	39	−1	34	
6	Brighton	22	9	4	9	38	37	+1	31	
7	Bayside Argonauts	22	9	4	9	33	34	−1	31	
8	Monash University	22	9	2	11	45	43	+2	29	
9	Ashburton United	22	8	4	10	35	47	−12	28	
10	Frankston Pines	22	7	5	10	34	38	−4	26	
11	Middle Park	22	3	1	18	24	62	−38	10	
12	Diamond Valley United	22	1	4	17	15	61	−46	7	

Source: sportstg.com
Rules for classification: 1) Points; 2) Goal difference; 3) Number of goals scored

=== 2019 NPL Victoria Women ===
(Victoria (state)) NPL Victoria Women
- Season: 2019
- Champions: Calder United
- Premiers: Calder United

The highest tier domestic football competition in Victoria for women is the National Premier Leagues Victoria Women. This was the fourth season of the NPL format. The 10 teams played each other 3 times for a total of 27 games.

Pos	Team	Pld	W	D	L	GF	GA	GD	Pts	Qualification or relegation
1	Calder United (C)	27	24	0	3	133	23	+110	72	Finals series
2	Bulleen Lions	27	21	1	5	94	18	+76	64	Finals series
3	Alamein FC	27	18	3	6	90	33	+57	57	Finals series
4	South Melbourne	27	14	4	9	86	50	+36	46	Finals series
5	Box Hill United	27	14	3	10	60	51	+9	45	
6	Heidelberg United	27	14	2	11	76	45	+31	44	
7	Bayside United	27	7	5	15	48	66	−18	26	
8	Greater Geelong Galaxy (R)	27	7	1	19	51	85	−34	22	Relegation to the 2020 VPL
9	Victorian Women's NTC	27	5	3	19	47	116	−69	18	
10	Southern United (R)	27	0	0	27	4	202	−198	0	Relegation to the 2020 VPL

Source: sportstg.com
Rules for classification: 1) points; 2) goal difference; 3) number of goals scored.
(C) Champions; (R) Relegated

== Cup Competitions ==
=== 2019 Dockerty Cup ===
Football Victoria soccer clubs competed in 2019 for the Dockerty Cup. The tournament doubled as the Victorian qualifiers for the 2019 FFA Cup, with the top four clubs progressing to the Round of 32. A total of 214 clubs entered the qualifying phase, with the clubs entering in a staggered format.

The Cup was won by Hume City, their first title.

In addition to the two A-League clubs (Melbourne Victory and Melbourne City), the four semi-finalists (Bulleen Lions, Hume City, Melbourne Knights and Moreland Zebras) competed in the final rounds of the 2019 FFA Cup.
