= Westgate FC =

Serbian-Australian Football club

Westgate Sindjelic Football Club Српски спортски клуб Синђелић
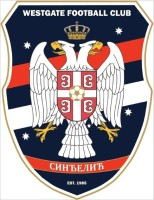
- Full name: Westgate Sindjelic Football Club
- Nicknames: Sindjelić; Sindja
- Founded: 18 February 1985; 41 years ago as Royal Richmond Football Club
- Ground: Ardeer Reserve
- Capacity: 1,500
- Manager: Terry Antoniadis
- League: Victorian State League 1 North-West
- 2024: Victorian State League 1 North-West, 3rd out of 12
Home colours	Away colours

Westgate Sindjelic Football Club or Srpski sportski klub Sindjelić (Serbian Cyrillic: Српски спортски клуб Синђелић; English: Serbian Sporting Club Sindjelić), commonly known as Westgate or Sindjelić, is a Serbian Australian association football club located in Ardeer, Melbourne. The club competes in the four tier Victorian State League 1 North-West.

Founded on 18 February 1985 as Royal Richmond, with its home ground based at Burnley Oval in the suburb of Richmond. In 1986, the club changed its home venue to Yarraville Oval and officially converted the club named to Westgate FC by 1987. The club won its first trophy in 1987 after winning the Victorian State League Division 2.

Westgate FC have twice been crowned champions of the Victorian State League Cup and have won the Men's Karadjordje Cup five times and the Women's Karadjordje Cup four consecutive times and are the undefeated reigning champions.

== History ==
=== 1985 – Inaugural season ===
Upon the club's foundation, they would compete in the Victorian State League Division 2 under the name Royal Richmond. Their home matches were played at Burnley Oval in the suburb of Richmond. The club's first ever goal scorer in an official league match was Tony Marchett, who scored in the 50th minute of Royal Richmond's Round 1 fixture against Waverley City on 23 March. The club eventually went on to be defeated 2–1, having been winning 1–0. Marchett would score again in the next fixture, which was a 2–0 away victory against Keilor Austria on 30 March. Dragan Vasic would get his name on the score sheet for the next three fixtures, himself and Tony Marchett would play a major part in scoring for the club throughout the duration of the season. After a series of many defeats, including a 4–0 home victory against South Oakleigh on 8 June, the club gained an important 3 points when defeating Dandenong City 2–0 away on 15 June, with goals coming from Dragan Vasic and Jim Kondarios. In Round 15, Royal Richmond gained another crucial 3 points to avoid relegation when they defeated Keilor Austria 2–0 at home on 29 June. From this match onwards, Royal Richmond went on to avoid defeat for the next seven matches, with Dragan Vasic netting six times out of the six fixtures, including an important 3–2 home victory against Coburg on 21 September. Having been un beaten for a total of eight consecutive weeks, the club suffered a 3–0 home defeat against Eltham on 17 August. After draws with South Melbourne, Sandringham and South Oakleigh, a win was needed to avoid relegation in their last round. In Round 26, Royal Richmond defeated Dandenong City 3–2 at home on 14 September, with a double from Dragan Vasic. The club finished their inaugural season 8th position with 22 points, 3 points from relegation, having won 8 matches, drawn 6 times and lost 12.

=== 1986 ===
In 1986, the club continued in the Victorian State League Division 2, the 1986 season being the last one in which they participated under the club name 'Royal Richmond'. In the 1986 season, the club used Yarraville Oval as their venue for home matches. Royal Richmond drew their first two fixtures before defeating Keilor Park 4–0 at home in round 3 on 5 April, with Dragan Vasic with three goals in the three fixtures and Tony Marchett with two. Vasic went on a goal-scoring stint from Round 5 to Round 12, netting 14 goals in 8 consecutive matches. In Round 17, Tony Marchett scored a hat-trick, becoming the first player to ever do so for the club, in a 4–0 home victory against Moreland Park Rangers on 12 July. The club finished the last round of the season with a 1–0 away victory against Bulleen on 13 September, with a goal from Dragan Vasic. The club finished in 5th position of the table with 30 points. Vasic concluded the 1986 season with 22 as the leading goal scorer of the Victorian State League Division 2.

==== 1987 – First league title ====
Under the name 'Westgate FC', the club began the 1987 Victorian State League Division 2 season with a 3–0 home victory against North Geelong Warriors on 28 March, Pedro Gasco (top player) scored a double. In the following fixtures, Westgate were thrashed 5–1 away against Prahran City on 4 April, with Pedro Gasco again scoring. By Round 5, Westgate had obtained three consecutive wins with Pedro Gasco netting in each match, totalling to six goals in five matches. In Round 10, Westgate recorded their biggest ever win, a 7–1 home victory against Eltham on 30 May, Tony Marchett scored a double and Pedro Gasco also got his name on the score sheet. Two fixtures later, Westgate demolished Doveton 4–0 at home on 13 June, with two goals from Pedro Gasco. Gasco again scored another double in the following fixture, which saw Westgate defeat Morington 5–3 away on 20 June. After suffering two defeats throughout a handful of matches, Westgate continued their winning ways with a 5–1 home victory against Hamlyn Rangers on 18 July. In the following fixture, Westgate would snare off a challenge from Dandenong City in a 1–0 away victory on 25 July, the goal coming from former National Soccer League and Australian national team player Joe Picioane. In Round 26, Westgate defeated Mornington 7–2 at home on 19 September, with Tony Marchett recording a total of 6 goals in the match. A Round 20 fixture against Altona City was rescheduled to be played at the end of the season. Prior to the fixture, Westgate were standing in third position of the Victorian State League Division 2 table, needing just 1 point in order to gain promotion to the Victorian State League Division 1. A win would see them crowned champions of the entire league, topping both Mooroolbark and Sandringham City, who both sat equal on top with 37 points. The match was played at Altona City's home, as they took an early lead in the match. Westgate eventually finished the game winning 3–1, ending the 1987 season in first place of the Victorian State League Division 2 with 38 points, 1 point ahead of joint second placed Mooroolbark and Sandringhan City and 3 points ahead of North Geelong Warriors. After just three years of experience in Victoria's stage leagues, Westgate FC gained promotion to the Victorian State League Division 1 for the 1988 season, a league in which they would serve for the next 15 seasons. Pedro Gasco netted a total of 18 league goals for the club and was the leading goal scorer of the entire league. Joe Picioane was also awarded with the Best and Fairest award of the entire league.

==== 1988 – Division 1 and first cup title ====
Westgate's season concluded in 7th position of the 1988 Victorian State League Division 1 table with a total of 28 points. Westgate's 1988 season kicked off with a 1–0 away victory against Nunawading on 2 April, with Tony Marchett scoring. The season would consist of regular wins and losses, before Westgate went on an undefeated streak from Round 11 to Round 14, notably beating Nunawading City 4–0 at home on 2 July, with Chris Andriotis scoring a double. In Round 18, Westgate would thrash Richmond 6–0 at home on 30 July, with Tony Marchett scoring a double. Westgate also claimed their first State League Cup title, after former South Melbourne striker Chris Andriotis netted in a 1–0 victory against Mooroolbark in the final.

==== 1989 ====
Westgate's 1989 season commenced with two straight losses and one draw. The club earned their first 3 points in Round 4 in a 1–0 home victory against Albion on 22 April, with a goal from Milorad Gelic. Number of draws and losses continued, including a 4–0 defeat away against Sandringham City on 27 May in Round 9. In the following round, Westgate earned just their second league win of the season in a 1–0 home victory against Broadmeadows City on 3 June, with a goal from Milan Vlatokovic. Vlatkovic again scored in the following fixture, a 1–0 away victory against Essendon on 10 June. In Round 16, Westgate earned a crucial 3 points in a 2–1 home victory against Mooroolbark on 15 July. As of Round 19, Westgate then went undefeated until Round 23, recording an important 5–0 away victory against Mordialloc on 20 August and conceding just one goal within the 4 rounds. Westgate went on to lose their last two matches of the season and concluded the competition in 8th position, with 25 points, just 3 points from being relegated.

=== 1990s ===
From 1988 to 2002 (15 seasons) they competed in Victorian State League Division 1. In 2002 Wesgate finished 10th, and had to go into a play-off to remain in the division. The club also made an appearance in the final of the Harry Armstrong (Reserves) Cup in 1993. The game was played as a curtain raiser to the Dockerty Cup final between Heidelberg United and South Melbourne at Olympic Park.

=== 2000s ===
The 2000 Victorian State League Division 1 season saw Westgate defeated 5–3 away to Westvale in Round 1, before defeating Springvale White Eagles 1–0 at home in Round 2. Westgate went on to suffer 8 consecutive defeats, including a 4–0 home defeat against Frankston Pines in Round 8 and a 5–0 away defeat against Essendon in Round 10. They ended their losing streak with a 4–3 home victory against Doncaster Rovers in Round 11, and the following week, Darryl Spiteri netted a hat-trick at home in a 3–1 victory against Westvale in Round 12. In the following fixture, Tony Lingurovski netted a double and Darryl Spiteri also found his name on the scoresheet as Westgate defeated Springvale White Eagles 3–1 away in Round 13. Westgate continued their winning ways when Darryl Spiteri again scored in a 1–0 home victory against Richmond in the following fixture in Round 14. The goal was Spiteri's 5th in three consecutive games and Westgate had gone four weeks without losing. They then suffered two losses and two draws before being defeated 4–2 away against Frankston Pines in Round 19. Westgate went on to lose the next two matches, the second being a 7–0 thrashing at home against Essendon in Round 21, one of the biggest defeats in Westgate's history. Westgate won their last match of the season, a 4–1 away victory against Doncaster Rovers in Round 22, with a hat-trick from Darryl Spiteri and a goal from Robert Georgieski, the win was enough to avoid relegation. Westgate finished the season towards the bottom half of the table, just 3 points from relegation. Darryl Spiteri had also concluded the season with 12 goals, finishing as the league's 5th leading goal scorer.

The 2001 Victorian State League Division 1 began with a 4–2 home defeat against Westvale. Another two losses would follow until Round 4, when Westgate defeated Springvale White Eagles 5–0 away, with Tony Lingurovski scoring a hat-trick. In the following fixture, Westgate again earned 3 points with another 5–0 victory away against Frankston Pines. Westgate would then go on to achieve a 2–0 and a 1–0 victory, keeping a clean sheet for four weeks straight. Unbeaten since Round 3, Westgates undefeated streak was ended in Round 13 in a 1–0 home defeat against Western Suburs. Another two losses followed, followed by a series of two draws and another loss, Westgate did not win another fixture until Round 19 in a 3–0 away victory against Sunshine George Cross, with Tony Lingurovski scoring a hat-trick. Westgate concluded the last 3 fixtures of the season with two draws and a 5–0 home victory against Frankston Strikers on 9 September. Westgate concluded the season in 7th position with 31 points. Tony Lingurovski had scored a total of 14 league goals and finished the season as the league's 3rd leading goal scorer.

==== 2001 – Second cup title ====

Westgate 2001 State League Cup final squad.

Westgate were drawn in Group 6 of the 2001 State League Cup against Keilor Park, Williamstown and North Sunshine Eagles. Westgate would gain 5 points form their group stage, having drawn twice and won in a 5–1 thrashing against Northern Sunshine Eagles on March, with Francisco Vera netting a double. In Round 2 of the competition, Westgate were drawn against Westvale where they would defeat them 3–2 on 17 March. On 25 March, Westgate defeated Whittlesea Stallions 2–0 at the quarter-final stage of the competition. In the semi-final, Westgate faced Northcote City on 16 April, where they would come out winners with a 4–3 result after extra time. Westgate then faced Cranbourne Comets in the 2001 State League Cup final on 25 April, the match was refereed by Senko Rastocic and the venue of the final was SS Anderson Reserve, the stadium of Port Melbourne Sharks. Cranbourne Comets had not conceded a goal during the entire competition, going six games with a clean sheet. Darryl Spiteri, Zoran Kostadinovski and Alex Jovicic were all substituted in during the second half for Westgate as Dusko Delic scored in the 67th minute of the match to win 1–0.

==== 2002 – Relegation to FFV Division 2 ====
Westgate began the 2002 Victorian State League Division 1 campaign with a series of poor results, one loss and two draws, before earning their first 3 points in Round 4 against Springvale White Eagles in a 1–0 home victory on 28 April. They were only able to score 2 goals out of the 4 fixtures. The following two rounds saw Westgate suffer defeats, without being able to score any goals, a 3–0 away loss against Essendon Royals on 4 May and a 2–0 home defeat against Knox City on 11 May. In Round 7, they were able to gain an important 3 points in a 3–1 away victory against Thomastown Devils on 20 May, with goals coming from Kwabena Adomako, Dan Ito and Ernie Tapai. In Round 9, Westgate avoided defeat against Frankston Pines, who eventually won the league and lost just once, after a 0–0 away draw on 1 June. Westgate continued to draw their fixtures, which eventually became a total of 9 as the season concluded. They were able to earn another important 3 points in a 3–1 home victory against Essendon Royals on 20 July. Another series of losses and draws would continue, including another tie with Frankston Pines, which ended 1–1 at home on 18 August. In round 21, Westgate defeat Oakleigh Cannons 1–0 at home on 31 August with a goal from Zdravko Atanasovski and in the following fixture thrashing Lalor United 9–3 away on 7 September with Jim Gacovski scoring three and Quentin O'Grady, Kwabena Adomako and Rene Andersen netting a double each. The 9–3 result recorded the club's highest ever win. Westgate finished the 2002 season third last, with 27 points, needing just 2 points to avoid relegation, and subsequently appeared in the league play-off against North Coburg United, who had finished in 2nd place in the 2002 Victorian State League Division 2 North-West. Over just one-leg of the promotion-relegation play-off, Westgate were defeated 4–2 against North Coburg United on 21 September and, along with Springvale White Eagles and Lalor United, were relegated to the Victorian State League Division 2.

==== 2003–2005 ====
The 2003 Victorian State League Division 2 North-West season began in a positive manner for Westgate, as they obtained 10 points in their first five fixtures, losing just one, and winning three times, including two 4–2 home victories. A series of losses would then following, including a 4–0 thrashing against Williamstown on 7 June in Round 9. This was part of six rounds going without a win, with Westgate losing give times and drawing just once. In Round 12, Westgate earned an important victory against Moreland City in a 3–2 away victory on 28 June, with Daniel Glogovac scoring a double and Alex Jovicic netting to assure Westgate's victory against a team who eventually went on to finish in third place of the table. In the following round, Westgate would record a 5–1 home victory against Croxton Park on 5 July, with Daniel Glogovac again on the scoresheet alongside Sam Bubulj, and Dino Grillo, who scored a hat-trick. Westgate went on to suffer two consecutive 4–1 defeats, before drawing the last two fixtures of the season 2–2 and 3–3, with Dino Grillo scoring three goals in within the two matches. Westgate concluded the season in 9th spot of the Victorian State League Division 2 North-West table, three points from being relegated, with a total of 28 points.

Having lost in Round 1 of the 2004 Victorian State League Division 2 North-West season, Westgate obtained 6 points in their next two matches, having won twice, with Con Georgiou scoring 4 goals during both fixtures Westgate went on to draw three times and win once in the next four rounds, with Ivan Filiposki scoring in three out of the four fixtures. Westgate continued their undefeated streak by defeating North Sunshine Eagles 4–2 at home on 5 June and Moreland City 1–0 at home in the following fixtures on 12 June, Ivan Filiposki again netting in both matches. Filiposki scored in the following fixture, a 2–1 away loss against Brunswick City on 19 June, the defeat spelling an end to the club's nine-week undefeated stint. in Round 14, Westgate would win 4–1 away at Corio on 10 July, with two goals from Ivan Filiposki. Filiposki had scored 7 goals in the last 6 consecutive fixtures from Rounds 9 to 14. In Round 17 on 31 July, Westgate recorded a 5–0 home victory against Albion Rovers SC with a double being scored by both Dimce Panev and David Maglovski, Alex Stevanovic would also get on the score sheet. Westgate would then draw once and win twice before losing their last two fixtures of the 2004 season. The season concluded seeing Westgate with 38 points, one point under Keilor Park, finishing in 4th position.

Beginning the 2005 season winning their first two fixtures, Westgate would then lose their next two matches. In Round 5 they would draw 3–3 away against North Geelong Warriors, who would eventually go on to win the league and gain promotion, on 30 April, with goals coming from Adrian Caniglia, Con Georgiou and Dejan Tosic. In Round 8, Westgate would thrash Geelong SC 4–1 at home on 13 July, and would win the next three matches 1–0, 1–0 and 2–0. Their four-week winning streak would end on 18 June against Banyule City in a 3–2 away defeat. This defeat would be one of 10 matches that Westgate would lose out of their following 11 fixtures, losing 9 of them consecutively, including a 4–0 away loss against Lalor United on 20 August, and a 2–1 home loss against Thomastown Devils on 30 July, with one of Thomastown's goals being scored by Joe Montagnese, who would go on to coach Westgate in 2014. Despite the club's 11-week winless streak, Westgate finished in 8th position of the 2005 Victorian State League Division 2 North-West season table with 23 points, just a single point clear of being relegated.

==== Second league title and 2007 FFV Division 1 ====
The 2006 season commenced with a 1–0 away victory against Altona City on 1 April. Milan Savic scoring the only goal of the match. In the following match, Westgate would win 4–2 at home against Westvale on 8 April with Dominic Murdaca scoring a double. Westgate continued their winning streak with a 4–1 away victory in Round 3 against Keilor Park on 22 April, with Dominic Murdaca again on the score sheet. Their first loss of the season came in the following fixture on 29 April, a 2–1 home defeat against Lalor United. This loss would be one of just four losses during the entire 2006 season, with Westgate commencing an 11-week unbeaten run as of Round 8 which included a 6-week winning streak which included two 4–0 victories. Westgate eventually suffered a 2–0 away defeat against Yarraville Glory on 19 August in Round 19, however, Westgate had obtained their second league title with three league fixtures remaining. Westgate finished in first place of the Victorian State League Division 2 North-West table with 50 points, 6 points clear of their nearest rivals Keilor Park. Dominic Murdaca had scored 11 goals for Westgate during the 2006 season and was also the leading goal scorer of the league.

===== 2007 =====
Westgate's commencement to the 2007 Victorian State League Division 1 season began slowly, with just 4 points being obtained in the first five rounds. In Round 6, the club would gain an important win to keep them mid-table in a 2–1 away victory against North Geelong Warriors on 19 May. Westgate had been trailing 1–0 until goals from Daniel Glogovac and Marcos Oliveira would help seal the victory. Westgate would go on to win the next two fixtures with clean sheets with two 1–0 results, including an away victory against Hume City, who had been undefeated all season, on 2 June, with a goal from Zdravko Atanasovski. After two consecutive defeats, the club would play out a 3–3 draw with Brunswick City on 23 June to gain 1 point, with Robert Trajanovski scoring all three goals. In the following fixture, Westgate would gain a crucial 3 points after defeating Port Melbourne Sharks in a 2–1 result at home on 30 June to avoid the relegation zone. Both Robert Trajanovski and Zdravko Atanasovski had netted Westgate's goals. In Round 14, Westgate were demolished 6–2 away against Dandenong Thunder on 14 July, the match would be one of three fixtures that Westgate would go on to lose in the next five rounds. Westgate would not record their next win, a crucial one, until Round 19 which was again against Hume City as goals came from Ilce Mladenovski and Boban Pajic. Westgate sealed a 2–1 home victory on 18 August. Ilce Mladenovski would again strike in the following fixture against St. Albans Saints as Westgate defeated their opponents in a 1–0 away victory on 26 August, assuring their presence in the Victorian State League Division 1 for the 2008 season. The club would end the season with a 2–1 away victory against Brunswick City on 8 September in Round 22, with goals coming from Joe De Bono and Michael Maljanek. Westgate concluded the 2007 Victorian State League Division 1 season in 7th place with 30 points, having won 8, drawn 6 and lost 8 fixtures in total.

==== 2008 and 2009 relegation ====
===== 2008 FFV Division 1 =====
Westgate commenced the 2008 Victorian State League Division 1 season two consecutive loses before gaining their first 3 points in a 4–0 home victory against Springvale White Eagles on 19 April in Round 3, with Boban Pajic scoring twice. In Round 5, Westgate recorder an important 3–1 home victory against Sunshine George Cross on 3 May, with Robert Trajanovski scoring his third goal in three consecutive fixtures. Westgate would then face poor results, drawing four times and losing twice in the next six rounds. They would not get their next win until Round 12 in a 4–1 away victory against Kingston City on 20 June. Westgate would gain just 2 points out of their next 8 fixtures, having suffered 6 loses, including a 7–1 away thumping against Bulleen Royals on 25 August. The club would get its last win of the 2008 season in a 2–0 home victory against Keilor Park on 30 August before being held 1–1 away at Langwarrin on 6 September. Westgate had finished in third last place on the table, with 20 league points, and were relegated alongside Keilor Park and Kingston City.

===== 2009 FFV Division 2 =====
Westgate's 2009 Victorian State League Division 2 campaign got under way on a negative note, with the club obtaining just two points out of its first four fixtures. They would record their first win in Round 5 in a 2–0 away victory against Williamstown on 2 May, with Jamie Porter netting a double. One week later, a 6–2 away thrashing would follow at the hands of North Geelong Warriors on 8 May. David Maglovski would score both of Westgate's goals. Another victory would follow, as Westgate then went on to lose three more matches. In Round 12, the club would secure its third league win in a 4–1 thrashing against Thomastown Devils on 27 June. The club faced a series of draws and losses before earning their last wins in Rounds 20 and 22, with Kwabee Otuo-Acheampong scoring a total of three goals in both fixtures. Westgate were relegated for the second consecutive season, again alongside Keilor Park. Both clubs had finished as the bottom two teams on the 2009 Victorian State League Division 2 North-West table.

=== 2010s ===
==== 2010 promotion to Division 2 ====
Westgate commenced the 2010 Victorian State League Division 3 with two consecutive draws before obtaining their first win in a 3–2 away victory against Melbourne University Rangers on 24 April, as Volkan Kalayci scored a double. By Round 10, the club would suffer just its third defeat of the season as by that time they had gained 15 points. After two consecutive loses, Westgate defeated Geelong SC 2–1 away from home on 23 July, as Josh D'Alessi would score both goals to keep the club's title hopes alive. Westgate would go on to win the next three fixtures with Henry Nunez scoring in each match, including a 6–1 home thrashing of Essendon United on 14 August, where Josh D'Alessi would score a hat-trick making that his sixth goal in the last four matches. D'Alessi went on to score a double in the next fixture as Westgate were defeated 4–2 away at La Trobe University on 21 August. Westgate would win the next three league matches, conceding just one goal in the process, which clinched them the title and gained them promotion back into the Victorian State League Division 2 North-West for the 2011 season having concluded the season with 40 points, just two points from their nearest rivals Geelong SC.

==== 2011–2013 ====
The club commenced the 2011 Victorian State League Division 2 North-West on a positive note with two wins in their first three matches, with Nana Addo scoring 3 goals in 3 appearances. Westgate earned two important victories in the next four rounds, including a 3–2 home victory against Altona East Phoenix on 30 April, with Josh D'Alessi netting a double. Westgate would comfortably beat Banyule City 4–1 at home on 28 May, before being thrashed 5–1 away against Moreland City in the following fixture on 4 June, with Joe De Bono scoring in both matches for Westgate. The following week, the club faced another 5–1 thrashing away against Ballarat Red Devils on 18 June. By Round 13, the club faced their fourth loss in five matches until a 15th minute Henry Nunez goal in a Round 14 fixture was enough to see the club earn a 1–0 home victory against Williamstown on 16 July. Westgate would then suffer four defeats in the next five fixtures. In Round 21, the club would earn just their seventh win of the 2011 season in a 4–1 home victory against Ballarat Red Devils on 12 September, with Joe De Bono scoring a double. Westgate finished in 9th position on the table, having been deducted 3 points along with Werribee City, Brunswick City, Clifton Hill and Geelong SC, with 21 league points in total.

Westgate commenced the 2012 FFV Division 2 season with a 4–1 home victory against Preston Lions on 31 March. In Round 2, the club would be held to a 1–1 away draw against Ballarat Red Devils on 14 April, this draw being one of eleven that Westgate would go on to take with them to the end of the season. In Round 5, the club recorded its second win of the season in a 2–0 away victory against Keilor Park on 12 May, with goals coming from Matthew Italiano and Nemanja Vucic. Westgate would go on to win two out of their next five fixtures, including a 4–2 home victory against La Trobe University on 23 June, with Raffael Origlia scoring a first-half double. Origlia would score in the next fixture as Westgate would be defeated 2–1 away against Moreland City on 30 June, having been 1–0 in front. Westgate went on to suffer two consecutive defeats in their next three fixtures, including a 4–1 home thrashing against Brunswick City on 21 July. In Round 18, Westgate would earn their last match of the 2012 season in a 3–2 home victory against Clifton Hill on 18 August, with goals coming from Matthew Italiano, Raffael Origlia and Kwabee Otuo-Acheampong. The club would draw their last three fixtures of the season before concluding the competition in 7th position of the 2012 Victorian State League Division 2 North-West table, having been deducted one point, ultimately with 25 points.

==== 2014–2017 State League 1 ====
Due to the introduction of Australia's new National Premier League competition, Westgate went from State League 2 North-West to the new State League 1 North-West, but retained its level in the Australian soccer league system as the Premier League was made up of NPL Victoria and NPL Victoria 2. The club participated in its first official competitive fixture in the 2014 Dockerty Cup. It was the club's first appearance in the competition since its return in 2011. Westgate were defeated 3–0 at home against Mornington in the competition's Third Round on 14 March. Westgate finished the season in 9th place, two points clear of the relegation zone.

In 2015, Westgate dispatched Hampton Park United by a scoreline of 5–1 in the Third Round of the 2015 FFA Cup preliminary rounds, but lost 3–1 to Geelong SC at Stead Park in the Fourth Round, exiting the competition. In the league, Sindjelic once again placed 9th and once more narrowly avoided relegation, this time by three points.

Fortunes improved in 2016 and, with a young squad, the club finished in 6th place, well beyond pre-season expectations.

In 2017, though, Westgate was unable to fend off relegation, finishing in 11th position and experiencing relegation back to State League 2 North-West.

=== 2018–2021 ===
In the off-season, Westgate presented its newly redeveloped $1.5m facility, "Oreana Park" at Ardeer Reserve.

=== 2022 ===
==== Promotion to Division 1 ====
2022 was a big season for Westgate as it saw its long-awaited promotion back to the Men's State League 1 North-West.

The whole season was a nail-biter with the two promotion spots in constant contention with plenty of competitive football being played weekly.

It would come down to the final round of the season against Epping City SC. The start of the match saw Westgate taking the lead in the first half with a goal from Marino Gasparis which was then followed up by an Epping City equalizer to even things up going into the second half.

With everything riding on the second half, Liam Cannell earned his place in Westgate history when he scored the winning goal in the 65th minute and secured Westgate's promotion to State League 1 North-West with a second place league finish with 45 league points.

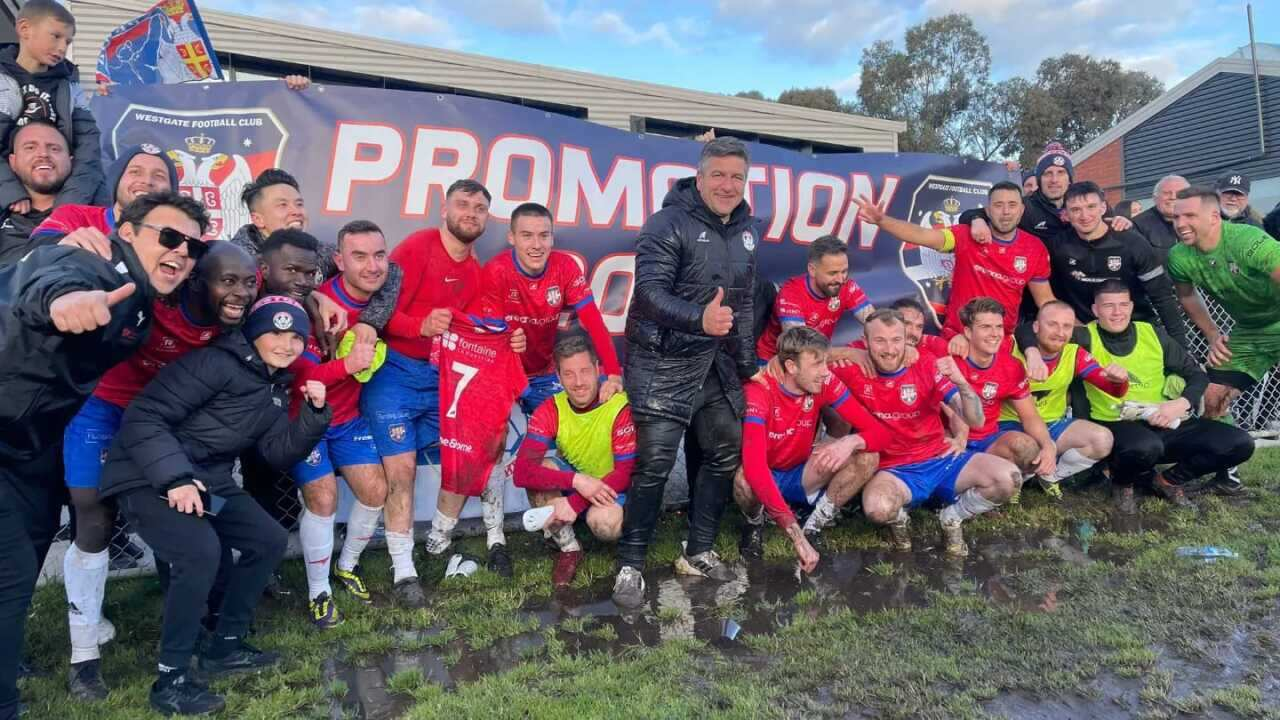
Promotion to State 1 North West

=== 2023 ===
==== The Return to State League 1 North West ====
2023 saw the return of Westgate FC to State League 1 after a five-year hiatus in State League 2.

Round 1 began with a 3–1 win for Westgate against Keilor Park SC with goals from Nikola Stijacic, Josh Calabria and Emile Damey.

Round 2 saw the club draw with Whittlesea United 2–2 after beginning the match with a convincing 2–0 lead with both Westgate goals being given by Nikola Stijacic.

Round 3 ended with a win for Westgate FC in their first away game of the season with a result of 1–2 against Corio FC, goals scored by Emile Damey and Goran Zoric.

Round 4 saw Westgate reach the top of the ladder with a win over Brimbank Stallions FC at the Ghetto. Julio Beltran scored the opening goal and was followed by Nikola Stijacic with two goals, and a result of 3–1.

Round 5 saw Westgate travel away to Strathnaver reserve to play against FC Strathmore Split, this encounter saw Westgate continue their undefeated streak with a 1–3 win for Sindjelic. Goal scorers were Goran Zoric with one and Nikola Stijacic with two.

Round 6 saw Westgate once again travel away, this time to Yallambie Park to play against Banyule City FC, the match would see Westgate take a 0–2 lead only to end in a draw with a result of 2–2. Goal scorers were Nikola Stijacic and Ginji Kanakubo.

Round 7 ended with Westgate's first loss in the 2023 season with a 2–3 win for Sydenham Park SC at the Ghetto. Goal scorers for Sindjelic were Ginji Kanakubo and Nikola Stijacic.

Round 8 would turn out to be another action packed night of football with Westgate playing away against Upfield SC. After being down 3–1, Sindjelic would come back and tie up things at 3–3 to end the night in a draw. Goal scorers were Nikola Stijacic, Julio Beltran and Joel Nikolic.

Round 9 would see the action back at the Ghetto with the result being a 1–1 draw against Whittlesea Ranges FC. Goal scored by Nathan Talevski.

Round 10 was another action packed night at the Ghetto with Westgate returning to its winning ways with a 4–0 win against Yarraville Glory FC. Goals scored by Liam Cannell, Nikola Stijacic and Julio Beltran with two.

Round 11 would see the club travel away to play against Altona City SC, the result would not go Westgate's way with the night ending in a 2–1 defeat. Goal scored by Nathan Talevski.

Round 12 saw Westgate travel away to play against Keilor park SC, which would see Sindjelic get the win with a 3–4 result. Goals scored by Jovan Djurkic, Joel Nikolic and Nikola Stijacic with 2.

Round 13 was once again an away game for Westgate FC with the club traveling away from the Ghetto to play against Whittlesea United SC, the result would not go Westgate's way with a loss 1–0.

Round 14 saw the action back at the Ghetto with Westgate playing against Corio SC, the result would go Westgate's way with a 1–0 win. Goal Scorer James Papadimitriou.

Round 15 saw the club travel away to the Club Italia Sporting Club to play against Brimbank Stallions FC in a close contest that ended in a 1–1 draw. Goal scored by Vedran Stojanovic.

Round 16 would be another action packed round of football with Westgate playing at home against FC Strathmore Split. the results would once again go in Westgate's favour with Sindjelic getting the 1–0 win. Goal scored by Nathan Talevski.

Round 17 was another home game at the Ghetto with Sindjelic playing against Banyule City SC. This contest would see Westgate get the win with a 3–1 victory, goals scored by Vedran Stojanovic, Julio Beltran and Jovan Durkic.

Round 18 saw Westgate travel away to Keilor lodge Reserve to play against Sydenham Park SC, the contest would see Sindjelic leave with a 3–1 loss. Goal scored by James Papadimitriou.

Round 19 was another round of Saturday night football at the Ghetto with Westgate playing against Upfield SC, the result would go Westgate's way with Sindjelic getting the 4–0 win. All four goals scored by Vedran Stojanovic.

Round 20 saw Westgate face off against Whittlesea Ranges FC away at Epping Stadium. The contest would see Sindjelic get the win with a 1–3 result, goals scored by Vedran Stojanovic with two and James Papadimitriou with one.

Round 21 saw Westgate travel away to McIvor Reserve to play against Yarraville Glory FC, the Friday nights action would see Sindjelic chalk up another win with a 1–3 victory. Goals scored by James Papadimitriou with two and Vedran Stojanovic with one.

Round 22 was the wrap up of the 2023 season of league football. Westgate finished the season with a 0–1 loss at the Ghetto to Altona City SC.

The end of the 2023 season would see the Westgate Seniors with a third-place finish and the Westgate Reserves with a fourth-place finish. The women's team would conclude the season as league champions thus being promoted to State League 2 North West.

=== 2024 ===
==== State League 1 North West ====
The 2024 season would see changes to the Westgate FC Senior squad coaching staff with coaches Jim Gacovski and Doug Mladenovic deciding to part ways with Westgate FC. Their replacements would come in the form of veteran coach and ex player Peter Schwellinger and his son Jeremy Schwellinger as coach and assistant coach respectively.

Round 1 – The opening round of the 2024 season would see Westgate travel away to Stead Park to take on Geelong SC who were recently relegated from NPL 3. A great performance by both sides would see Sindjelic get the win with a 1–2 result, both goals scored by Borbor Sam.

Round 2 – Westgate FC would travel away to McIvor Reserve to play against Yarraville Glory FC. The contest would see both sides share points with the result being 0–0.

Round 3 – Another away match saw Westgate FC travel to Gibb Reserve to play against Upfield SC. The encounter would see Sindjelic remain undefeated with a 1–3 victory. Goal scorers were Borbor Sam with 2 and Kemal Irdem with 1.

Round 4 – Once again on the road, Westgate would play away at Hume Reserve against Corio SC where Sindjelic would continue their unbeaten start to the season with a 0–2 win. Goals scored by Joel Nikolic and Melvin Becket.

Round 5 – Another away game for the 2024 season would see Westgate FC play FC Clifton Hill. This clash saw Sindjelic continue their unbeaten run with a 1–3 win. Goal scorers were Steve Fidele, James Papadimitriou and Julio Beltran.

Round 6 – Round 6 would be the last of 6 straight away games for Westgate FC and it would see the club play against Sydenham Park SC. The result would be a draw with the scores at 1–1. Goal scored by Julio Beltran.

Round 7 – After 6 straight away fixtures, Westgate would finally have its first home game of the season against FC Strathmore. A 96th min penalty for Sindjelic would see the club continue its undefeated streak with a 2–2 draw. Goals scored by Steve Fidele and Julio Beltran.

Round 8 – Another Home game for Westgate FC would see Sindjelic up against Western Suburbs SC. This encounter would end in a draw with the day finishing with a score of 0–0.

Round 9 – Once again at Home, Westgate would play against Brimbank Stallions FC. This clash would see Sindjelic taking the win with a result of 2–1 thus continuing their undefeated streak. Both goals scored by Steve Fidele.

Round 10 – A top of the table clash, Westgate would travel away to Mosaic Drive to play against league leaders Whittlesea United. This clash would unfortunately see Westgate get its first loss for the season with a 3–2 loss. Goal scorers were Vedran Stojanovic with 1 and Tom Mclachlan with 1.

Round 11 – On the road again, Westgate FC would make their way to Ballarat City FC for another night of state league football. The outcome was not in Sindjelic's favor with the boys leaving Ballarat with a 3–2 loss. Goals scored by Joel Nikola and Julio Beltran.

Round 12 – Back at the Ghetto, Westgate FC would play against Geelong SC. This fixture would result in a 3–0 win for Sindjelic due to forfeit after Geelong refused to continue play after a linesman was injured with replacements available.

Round 13 – Once again at home, Sindjelic would chaulk up another win after defeating Yarraville Glory FC with a 2–0 result. Both goals scored by Borbor Sam.

== Home ground ==
Westgate FC's home ground Ardeer Reserve is located on Helene Street in Melbourne's western suburb of Ardeer.

It is commonly referred to as "The Ghetto" by the clubs fan base due to its humble beginnings when most of the original club rooms and facilities were put together by its members.

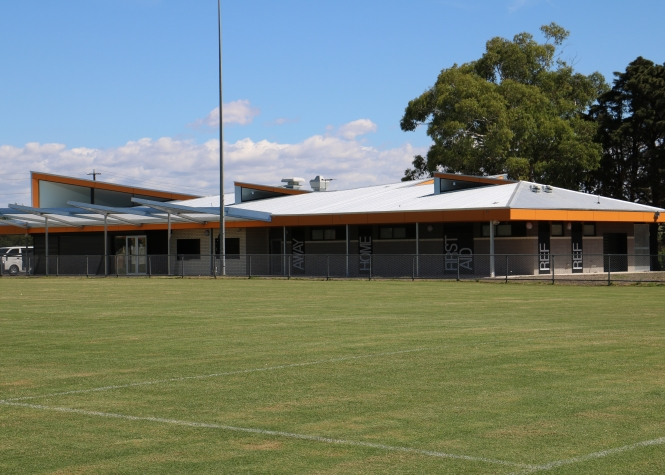

== Honours ==
=== Men ===
- Victorian State League Division 1
  - Best and Fairest (1): Jovan Đurkic (2023)
- Victorian State League Division 2
  - Winners (2): 1987, 2006
  - Runners-up (1): 2022
  - League Top Goal Scorer (1): Goran Zoric (2022)
- Victorian State League Division 3
  - Winners (1): 2010

=== Women ===
- Victorian State League Div 3 West
  - Winners (1): 2023
- Victorian State League Div 2 West
  - Winners (1): 2024
- Victorian State League Div 2 Championship
  - Winners (1): 2024

=== Cup ===
- Victorian State League Cup
  - Winners (2): 1988, 2001
- Karadjordje Cup Men:
  - Winners (5): 1989, 1990, 1991, 2002, 2006
  - Runners-up (7): 1987, 1992, 2003, 2004, 2007, 2013, 2014
- Karadjordje Cup Women:
  - Winners (4): 2019, 2022, 2023, 2025
- Ljubo Djekic Cup
  - Winners (1): 2024

== International representatives ==
- Joe Picioane – Australia national team (1978–1979)
- Warren Spink – Australia national team (1988–1997)
- Ernie Tapai – Australia national team (1990–1998)

== Club staff ==
Senior Coach	(Greece) Terry Antoniadis
Assistant Senior Coach	(Greece) James Pete

Goalkeeping Coach	(Serbia) Uros Matic
Reserve Coach	(North Macedonia) Goro Jankulovski
Assistant Reserve Coach
Senior Women Coach	(Greece) Stephanos Achilleos
Reserve Women Coach	(Greece) Nicholas Spanos

== Affiliated clubs ==
- (Australia) Springvale White Eagles – Westgate FC has a sister club relationship with Springvale White Eagles due to the ethnicity of the club's background.
- (Australia) Fitzroy City SC – Westgate FC has a sister club relationship with Fitzroy City SC due to the ethnicity of the club's background.
