= Monash Villareal FC =

Monash Villarreal FC
- Full name: Monash Villarreal Football Club
- Nickname: The 'Kitrino' (Yellow in Greek)
- Short name: MVFC
- Founded: 1997; 29 years ago
- Ground: Caloola Reserve, Oakleigh, Victoria
- Capacity: 500
- Chairman: Angelo Zissis
- Coach: Slavisa Lujic
- League: VSL 4 East
- 2025: 8th of 12
- Website: https://www.monashvillarrealfc.com/
Home colours	Away colours

Monash Villarreal Football Club is an Australian soccer club based in Hughesdale a suburb of Melbourne. Monash City FC was established in 1997 from the ashes of the Oakleigh United Club and changed their name in 2020 following a successful partnership with LaLiga outfit Villarreal. The club currently competes in Victorian State League Division 4.

== History ==
Upon the collapse of Oakleigh United FC after the 1996 season, several junior teams were left without a club. Monash City FC was formed by Greek-Australian migrants in 1997 as a junior only club to provide an avenue for those players to continue their football development.

Over the next 19 years the club became a junior powerhouse and competed at the highest level of junior football in Melbourne fielding teams in what was then the Victorian Junior Super League. This culminated with the Monash City FC Under 15 team of 2011 winning the Victorian region of the Manchester United Premier Cup. Ultimately the team was defeated by Onehunga SC from NZ in the pacific region final.

At the completion of the 2015 season the club looked to merge with Waverley Wanderers FC in an attempt to add Seniors teams. Unfortunately the merger collapsed. This resulted in the club deciding to enter their own senior teams into Victorian State League Division 5 in the 2016 season. They also competed for the first time in the Australian National Cup, 2016 FFA Cup, winning their first match against Chelsea FC.

After missing out on promotion in the 2017 season by a single goal, Monash entered the 2018 season as one of the favourites to be promoted to State League 5. An undefeated season saw them secure promotion and their first silverware as champions of State League 4 East. Prior to the 2020 season, Monash changed their name to Monash City Villarreal and signed a number of former NPL and State League 1 players in a bid to go for back to back promotions, prior to the 2020 season being cancelled.

== Colours and badge ==
From 1997–2019 the uniform colours were black and red stripes for home games and white with a red/black vertical stripe for away games. These colours were adopted after the Italian side A.C. Milan who wore the same colours and style.

After the 2019 season, the club switched to a bright Yellow home kit sponsored by Spanish kit supplier Joma.

== Nacho Ferrer ==
In 2024, they announced that Nacho Ferrer Ruiz would be the new Club Technical director and Head of Coaching. He brings experience with working for a few years with Real Madrid academy and also the Technical Director for Brisbane Strikers academy.

== Stadium ==
Monash play at Caloola Reserve in Oakleigh.

Recently the Victorian Government granted funding to repurpose the ground and upgrade its facilities which were completed in 2021.

The junior years train and play at Argyle Reserve, Hughsdale.

== Rivalries ==
Rivalries for the club include Waverley Wanderers and Chisholm United.

== Club Honours ==
- Victorian State League Division 5 East
  - Champions (1): 2018
- Victorian State League Division 4 East Reserves
  - Champions (2): 2022, 2025
