= 2019 National Premier Leagues Victoria Grand Final =

2019 soccer tournament

- Event: 2019 National Premier Leagues
Avondale	Bentleigh Greens
1	1
- Bentleigh Greens won 3–4 on penalties
- Date: 19 May 2019
- Venue: AAMI Park, Melbourne

The 2019 National Premier Leagues Grand Final was the sixth National Premier Leagues Victoria Grand Final, the championship deciding match of the National Premier Leagues Victoria in Australia. It was played on 15 September 2019 at AAMI Park in Melbourne between Avondale and Bentleigh Greens. Bentleigh won on penalties to secure their second National Premier Leagues Victoria title.

== Match ==
=== Details ===
15 September 2019

Avondale	1–1 (a.e.t.)	Bentleigh Greens
Penalties
	3–4

AAMI Park, Melbourne

== Broadcasting ==
The Grand Final was broadcast live through Australia on Facebook Live and YouTube.

== See also ==
- 2019 Football Federation Victoria season
- National Premier Leagues Victoria
