= Epping City SC =

Association Football club

Epping City FC
- Full name: Epping City Football Club
- Nickname: City
- Founded: 1990
- Ground: Aurora Fields, Epping, Victoria
- Capacity: 1,000
- Coordinates: -37.63787 145.02120
- League: Victorian State League Division 3 North-West
- 2025: 4th.
Home colours	Away colours

Epping City FC is an association football club representing the suburb of Epping, in Melbourne, Victoria established in 1990.

== History ==
Epping City Football Club was established in 1990 and plays matches at Aurora Fields in the Melbourne suburb of Epping. The club has also played at Duffy Street Recreation Reserve in the past and currently has their junior teams play there. Epping City currently plays in the Victorian State League Division 3 North-West and has a Women's team playing in the Victorian Women's State League 3 North-West. The team plays in a red and blue striped home kit.

Epping City began its history in the Victorian Provisional League in 2002 when City finished 5th place with 30 points in division 3. Epping City would stay in division 3 before being promoted to the Victorian Provisional League Division 2 in 2008 when the club finished second. City's Best Victorian provisional League season would be in 2012 when the club would finish 2nd place with a record 49 points, in the Victorian Provisional League Division 2 North-West. In 2013 the club would join the Victorian state League in the fourth division of the Victorian State Leagues. The club would finish the season in 7th place with a total of 27 points. Epping City would be promoted from the Victorian State League Division 4 North (The 8th tier of Australian football) in 2016 after the club finished league champion without losing a single match. Epping City would go on to defeat Brandon Park 3–1 at JL Murphy Reserve, in the Victorian State League Division 4 Final. This would mean Epping City would be promoted to the 3rd division in the Victorian State Leagues. In 2018 Epping City became State League Division 3 North-West Champions (The 7th tier of Australian football) with a total of 48 points gaining promotion to the Victorian State League Division 2 North-West. City would qualify for the Victorian State League 3 Finals. Epping City would then defeat Boroondara-Carey Eagles 3–2 at Grange Reserve to become Victorian State League Champions. The club would follow that season with a 3rd-place finish in 2019 missing promotion by 1 point.

In 2020 Epping City attempted to celebrate its 30th anniversary season but the season was canceled due to the COVID-19 pandemic. Epping City would be relegated From the Victorian State League Division 2 to the State League Division 3 North-West after finishing last place with only 10 points in the 2023 season.

== Colours and badge ==
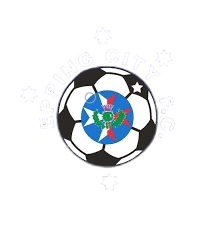
The original logo of Epping City used until 2024

the club plays in a red and blue striped home kit similar to FC Barcelona with blue shorts and socks. This is due to the founders of the club being from a mix of Maltese and Scottish backgrounds. The red representing the Malta and blue representing Scotland. These links are also shown in the clubs original logo displaying a Scottish thistle and Maltese cross displayed within a football surrounded by the southern cross. Epping City also Play in a white away kit. Since 2025 Epping City has used a logo with a football and red and blue stripes.

== Season by Season History ==
Epping City has competed in the Victorian Provisional Leagues before playing in the Victorian State League in the fourth division. In 2016 the club would be promoted to the third division in 2016 after becoming champion in an invincible season. The club would be promoted again in 2018 before being relegated back down into the third division in 2023. Since 2014, alongside the clubs League competition Epping City has competed in the Australia Cup. The clubs best performance has been reaching the fourth preliminary round. Epping City has achieved this 6 times, once in 2019 and then every year since 2021.

Season	League	Status	Pos.	Wins	Draws	Losses	Points	Finals	Cup
2002	Victorian Provisional League Division 3	n/a	5th	9	3	10	30	DNQ	n/a
2003	Victorian Provisional League Division 3 North-West	n/a	7th	8	5	9	29	DNQ	n/a
2004	Victorian Provisional League Division 3 North-West	n/a	4th	11	5	6	38	DNQ	n/a
2005	Victorian Provisional League Division 3 North-West	n/a	3rd	11	5	6	45	DNQ	n/a
2006	Victorian Provisional League Division 3 North-West	n/a	6th	11	2	9	35	DNQ	n/a
2007	Victorian Provisional League Division 3 North-West	n/a	4th	11	2	9	44	DNQ	n/a
2008	Victorian Provisional League Division 3 North-West	Promoted	2nd	15	3	4	48	DNQ	n/a
2009	Victorian Provisional League Division 2 North-West	n/a	5th	10	5	7	35	DNQ	n/a
2010	Victorian Provisional League Division 2 North-West	n/a	4th	10	5	7	35	DNQ	n/a
2011	Victorian Provisional League Division 2 North-West	n/a	7th	11	3	8	36	DNQ	n/a
2012	Victorian Provisional League Division 2 North-West	n/a	2nd	15	4	3	49	DNQ	n/a
2013	Victorian State League Division 4 North	n/a	7th	7	6	9	27	DNQ	n/a
2014	Victorian State League Division 4 North	n/a	4th	11	3	8	36	DNQ	PR2
2015	Victorian State League Division 4 North	n/a	4th	13	3	6	42	DNQ	PR2
2016	Victorian State League Division 4 North	Promoted	1st	18	4	0	58	W	PR2
2017	Victorian State League Division 3 North-West	n/a	5th	10	9	3	39	DNQ	PR1
2018	Victorian State League Division 3 North-West	Promoted	1st	15	3	4	48	W	PR3
2019	Victorian State League Division 2 North-West	n/a	3rd	13	4	5	43	DNQ	PR4
2020	Victorian State League Division 2 North-West	Canceled due to COVID-19 pandemic							PR3
2021	Victorian State League Division 2 North-West	Canceled due to COVID-19 pandemic							PR4
2022	Victorian State League Division 2 North-West	n/a	6th	8	2	12	26	DNQ	PR4
2023	Victorian State League Division 2 North-West	Relegated	12th	2	4	16	10	DNQ	PR4
2024	Victorian State League Division 3 North-West	n/a	10th	5	9	8	24	DNQ	PR4
2025	Victorian State League Division 3 North-West	n/a	4th	12	1	9	37	DNQ	PR4

- The Oz Football database was used as the source for 2002–2011 season results.

== Honours ==
=== Leagues and Finals ===
- Victorian State League Division 3 North-West
  - Winners (1): 2018
- Victorian State League Division 3 Final
  - Winners (1): 2018
- Victorian State League Division 4 North
  - Winners (1): 2016

- Victorian State League Division 4 Final
  - Winners (1): 2016
- Victorian Provisional League Division 2 North-West
  - Runners-up (1): 2012
- Victorian Provisional League Division 3 North-West
  - Runners-up (1): 2008
