= Victorian State League Men's =

Australian soccer league based in Victoria

- Organising body: Football Victoria
- Founded: 1958; 68 years ago
- Country: Australia
- State: Victoria
- Confederation: Asian Football Confederation
- Divisions: 7
- Number of clubs: 168
- Promotion to: Victorian Premier League Men's
- Domestic cup(s): National; Australia Cup; State; Dockerty Cup
- Current champions: North-West 1: Geelong (2026); South-East 1: South Springvale (2026)

The Victorian State League Men's (VSLM), known as the VETO Sports State League Men's for sponsorship reasons, is an Australian men's soccer league based in Victoria. It is administered by Football Victoria, covering the fourth-to-eighth-highest tiers in the Victorian soccer league system (and the fifth-to-ninth-highest nationally).

As of 2026, it consists of seven divisions (separated by two zones, North/West and South/East). Each division would have 24 teams, with 12 in each division. Mazenod FC would withdraw from the VETO State League 1 South/East on the 23rd of January 2026 leaving the State League 1 with only 23 teams. Clubs promoted from VSL 1 enter the Victorian Premier League (VPL). There is no relegation from the State League 7.

== History ==
The league was formed in 1958 as the Victorian Metropolitan League (VML), becoming the second-highest league in Victoria. It was renamed to the Victorian League in 1985, before adopting the VSL name in 1991.

In 2014, the first-tier Victorian Premier League was rebranded as the National Premier Leagues (NPL). The introduction of the NPL 1 (later renamed to NPL 2) competition resulted in the VSL becoming the third-highest Victorian competition. A further change to the pyramid structure occurred in 2020 with the establishment of NPL 3, making the VSL the fourth-highest Victorian competition.

== Format ==
In the 2014 season, the VSL 1 champions and runners-up (Eastern Lions and Moreland City respectively) were promoted to NPL 1, although no relegation to the VSL took place. This system was removed for the 2015 and 2016 seasons, but promotion and relegation was reintroduced in 2017, with the VSL 1 champions promoted and the bottom two placed clubs in NPL 2 relegated.

Beginning from the 2026 season, VSL 4 and VSL 5 will move from having to four zones to two, resulting in the creation of sixth and seventh VSL divisions. This will result in all VSL divisions having North-West and South-East zones.

== Current members ==
These are all clubs who are competing in the Victorian State League in the 2025 season.

=== Locations ===
Locations of the 2025 Victorian State League clubs by division in metropolitan Melbourne
– Division 1 – Division 2 – Division 3
– Division 4 – Division 5
Ballarat
Bendigo
Baw Baw
Geelong
Mitchell

=== Division 1 ===
North-West

- Altona East
- Ballarat City
- Geelong SC
- Clifton Hill
- Lalor United FC
- Pascoe Vale
- Sydenham Park
- Upfield
- Western Suburbs
- Westgate
- Westvale Olympic
- Yarraville Glory

South-East

- Beaumaris SC
- Banyule City
- Collingwood City
- Boroondara Eagles
- Doveton SC
- Hampton East Brighton
- Mornington
- Old Scotch
- Skye United FC
- South Springvale
- St Kilda SC

=== Division 2 ===
North-West

- Albion Rovers
- Altona North SC
- Brimbank Stallions
- Corio SC
- Geelong Rangers
- Mill Park
- Strathmore Split
- Surf Coast FC
- Uni Hill Eagles
- Western Eagles
- Whittlesea Ranges
- Williamstown SC

South-East

- Berwick City
- Brandon Park SC
- Casey Comets
- Chisholm United
- Dandenong South
- Gippsland United
- Knox City
- Mooroolbark
- Noble Park United
- North Caulfield
- Peninsula Strikers
- Waverley Wanderers

=== Division 3 ===
North-West

- Balmoral FC
- Brunswick Zebras
- Bundoora United
- Craigieburn City FC
- Dallas City FC
- Diamond Valley United
- Epping City
- Fawkner SC
- Hoppers Crossing SC
- Heidelberg Eagles
- Plenty Valley Lions
- Sunbury United

South-East

- Bentleigh United Cobras FC
- Croydon City Arrows
- Doncaster Rovers
- Elwood City
- Endeavour United SC
- Hampton Park United Sparrows
- Heatherton United
- Manningham Juventus FC
- Middle Park FC
- Rowville Eagles
- Sandringham
- White Star Dandenong

=== Division 4 ===
North-West

- Bell Park SC
- Keon Park SC
- Laverton FC
- Melbourne University SC
- Melton Phoenix FC
- Moonee Ponds United SC
- Point Cook FC
- Sebastopol Vikings SC
- Watsonia Heights FC
- West Preston FC
- Westside Strikers FC
- Barnstoneworth United FC

South-East

- Albert Park SC
- Ashburton United SC
- Baxter SC
- Chelsea FC
- East Kew FC
- Greater Dandenong FC
- Kings Domain FC
- Monash University
- Ringwood City SC
- Riversdale SC
- Rosebud SC
- Springvale City SC

=== Division 5 ===
North-West

- Bendigo City
- Darebin United SC
- Doreen United SC
- Deakin Ducks SC
- Heidelberg Stars
- Keilor Wolves SC
- Lara United FC
- Meadow Park SC
- Moonee Valley Knights FC
- Melbourne City FC
- Newport Storm FC
- Thornbury Athletic FC

South-East

- East Bentleigh SC
- FC Noble Hurricanes
- Fortuna 60
- Lyndale United FC
- Monash Villareal
- Monbulk Rangers SC
- Mount Waverley City SC
- Sandown Lions FC
- Seaford United SC
- Somerville Eagles SC
- Templestowe Wolves FC
- Yarra Jets

=== Division 6 ===
North-West

- Alphington FC
- Barwon SC
- Docklands Athletic Football Club
- Glenroy Lions FC
- Hume Bulls FC
- Maidstone United SC
- Melbourne University Soccer Club
- Moreland Eagles FC
- Ocean Grove SC
- Old Ivanhoe Soccer Club
- Spring Hills FC
- West Point Soccer Club

South-East

- Brighton SC
- Bunyip District SC
- Casey Panthers SC
- Frankston Pines SC
- Knox United SC
- Mentone Soccer Club
- Mount Eliza SC
- Old Melburnians SC
- Old St Kevins SC
- Pakenham United FC
- Truganina Soccer Club
- Whitehorse United SC

=== Division 7 ===
North-West

- Dynamo Melbourne FC
- ETA Buffalo Club of Victoria
- FC Birrarung
- Footscray Rangers FC
- Gisborne SC
- Greenvale United SC
- La Trobe University SC
- Mitchell Rangers SC
- Murray United FC
- Old Trinity Grammarians SC
- Roxburgh Park United SC
- Wyndham FC

South-East

- Aspendale SC
- Boronia SC
- Burwood City FC
- Cleeland United SC
- Croydon Ranges SC
- Endeavour Hills SC
- Glen Waverley Junior SC
- Keysborough District FC
- Keysborough SC
- Lilydale Montrose United SC
- Mount Martha SC
- Noble Suns FC

== Champions ==
=== 1958–1963 ===
Season	Division 1 North	Division 1 South	Division 2 North	Division 2 South
1958	Footscray Capri	Yarra Park	Corio	West Melbourne Sicilia
1959	Preston Croatia	Melbourne Hungaria	Moonee Ponds	Sandringham City
1960	South Melbourne Hellas	Richmond	Lions	Ferntree Gully
1961	Lions	Preston Croatia	Alexander	Preston Makedonia
1962	Croatia	Richmond	Coburg United	Triestina
1963	Alexander	Triestina	Libertas	Park Rangers

=== 1964–1999 ===
Season	Division 1	Division 2	Division 3	Division 4
1964	Croatia	Moonee Ponds	Ringwood United	Waverley City
1965	Alexander	St Albans	Frankston City	Princes Park Hercules
1966	Preston Makedonia	Sunshine City	Albion Rovers	Keilor City
1967	Ringwood City	Altona City	Keilor City	Yallourn
1968	Box Hill	Keilor City	Yallourn	Ballarat
1969	Alexander	Prahran City	Princes Park Hercules	Mooroolbark United
1970	Box Hill	Yallourn	Mooroolbark United	North Carlton Olympic
1971	Elwood Austria	Green Gully	Heidelberg	Newport
1972	Prahran Slavia	Western Suburbs	Ferntree Gully	Eltham
1973	Mooroolbark United	Preston Makedonia	North Carlton Olympic	Essendon City
1974	Sunshine City	Waverley City	Brighton	East Melbourne Helvetic
1975	Preston Makedonia	Box Hill	Heidelberg	Doncaster Rovers
1976	Green Gully	Dandenong City	Bell Park	Broadmeadows City
1977	Albion Rovers	Doveton	Knox City	Doncaster Rovers
1978	Croydon City	Melbourne Hungaria	South Melbourne Hellas	Fawkner Blues
1979	Western Suburbs	Keilor	Park Rangers	Frankston Pines
1980	Doveton	Park Rangers	Frankston Pines	Werribee City
1981	Maribyrnong Polonia	Fawkner Blues	Bell Park	Mornington
1982	Fawkner Blues	Melbourne Hungaria	Thomastown Devils	Caulfield City
1983	Western Suburbs	St Albans Saints	Caulfield City	Hamlyn Rangers
1984	Springvale City	Mornington	Hamlyn Rangers	Yarraville
1985	Melbourne	South Oakleigh	Prahran City	Rosanna
1986	Oakleigh	Bulleen	Mooroolbark	Clarinda
1987	Bulleen Lions	Westgate	West Brunswick	Lalor United
1988	Frankston Pines	Sandringham City	Geelong	Holland Park
1989	Mooroolbark	North Geelong	Bell Park	Clayton Inter
1990	Doveton	Bell Park	Altona City	East Brunswick-Ivanhoe
1991	North Geelong	Richmond	Oakleigh Suburbs	Regent
1992	Springvale City	Broadmeadows City	Springvale United	Pascoe Vale
1993	Werribee City	Box Hill Inter	Lalor United	Altona East
1994	Doncaster Rovers	Clarinda	Altona East	Westvale
1995	Bentleigh Greens	Springvale White Eagles	Westvale	South Springvale
1996	Springvale White Eagles	Westvale	Frankston	Geelong
1997	South Dandenong	Ringwood City	Cranbourne	Malvern City
1998	Westvale	Oakleigh	Geelong	Moreland City
1999	Oakleigh	Frankston Pines	South Wantirna	Langwarrin

=== 2000–2012 ===
Season	Division 1	Division 2 North-West	Division 2 South-East	Division 3 North-West	Division 3 South-East
2000	South Dandenong	Fitzroy City	Frankston Strikers	Croxton Park	Langwarrin
2001	Whittlesea Stallions	Albion Rovers	Knox City	Keilor Park	Monbulk Rangers
2002	Frankston Pines	Northcote City	Kingston City	North Sunshine Eagles	Brunswick City
2003	Oakleigh Cannons	Sunshine Georgies	Richmond	Keilor Park	Clayton
2004	Heidelberg United	Brunswick City	Langwarrin	Yarraville Glory	Chelsea
2005	Kingston City	North Geelong Warriors	Springvale White Eagles	Maribyrnong Greens	Waverley Wanderers
2006	Western Suburbs	Westgate	Cranbourne Comets	Werribee City	Heatherton United
2007	Frankston Pines	Keilor Park	Clifton Hill	Ballarat Red Devils	Frankston Strikers
2008	Sunshine Georgies	Pascoe Vale	Northcote City	Geelong Rangers	Morwell Pegasus
2009	Northcote City	North Geelong Warriors	Malvern City	Banyule City	Berwick City
2010	St Albans Saints	Port Melbourne	Southern Stars	Westgate	Noble Park United
2011	Whittlesea Zebras	Werribee City	Dandenong City	Keilor Park	Kingston City
2012	Pascoe Vale	Fawkner Blues	Eastern Lions	Avondale Heights	Doveton

=== 2013–2025 ===
Season	Division 1		Division 2		Division 3		Division 4				Division 5			
Season	North-West	South-East	North-West	South-East	North-West	South-East	East	North	South	West	East	North	South	West
2013	Heidelberg United		Moreland City	Springvale White Eagles	Cairnlea	Doncaster Rovers	Mooroolbark	Heidelberg Stars	Seaford United	Corio	Ringwood City	Bundoora United	St Kilda	Melton Phoenix
2014	Moreland City	Eastern Lions	North Sunshine Eagles	Frankston Pines	Essendon Royals	Sandringham City	Croydon City Arrows	Upfield	St Kilda	Hoppers Crossing	Eltham Redbacks	Greenvale United	Dandenong South	Keilor Wolves
2015	Western Suburbs	Mornington	Banyule City	Berwick City	Hoppers Crossing	St Kilda	Eltham Redbacks	Fawkner	Brighton	Melbourne City	Kings Domain	Mill Park	Springvale City	Spring Hills
2016	Altona Magic	Mornington	Geelong	St Kilda	Geelong Rangers	Mazenod United	Brandon Park	Epping City	Skye United	Brimbank Stallions	Healesville	RMIT	Rosebud Heart	North Melbourne Athletic
2017	Altona Magic	Langwarrin	Altona City	Eltham Redbacks	Brimbank Stallions	Knox City	Whitlehorse United	Boroondara-Carey Eagles	Bayside Argonauts	Point Cook	East Brighton United	Craigieburn City	Sandown Lions	Laverton Park
2018	Geelong	Manningham United Blues	Whittlesea United	Doveton	Epping City	Boroondara-Carey Eagles	Ashburton United	Lalor United	Monash University	Western Eagles	Monash City	Heidelberg Eagles	Chelsea	Westside Strikers Caroline Springs
2019	Preston Lions	Nunawading Ciity	Fitzroy City	Boroondara-Carey Eagles	Lalor United	Collingwood City	Hampton East Brighton	Heidelberg Eagles	Rowville Eagles	Altona North	Waverley Wanderers	Uni Hill Eagles	Somerville Eagles	Barnstoneworth United
2020	No competition played due to COVID-19 pandemic in Victoria.													
2021	Season cancelled due to COVID-19 pandemic in Victoria.													
2022	Caroline Springs George Cross	Beaumaris	Upfield	Collingwood City	Westvale Olympic	Hampton East Brighton	Chisholm United	Uni Hill Eagles	Dandenong South	Westside Strikers	St Kilda	Moonee Valley Knights	White Star Dandenong	Barwon
2023	Altona City	Melbourne Srbija	Clifton Hill	Mazenod	Uni Hill Eagles	Chisholm United	St Kilda	Bundoora United	White Star Dandenong	Laverton	Knox United	Yarra Jets	Hampton Park United Sparrows	Balmoral
2024	Whittlesea United	Eltham Redbacks	Keilor Park	Bayside Argonauts	Western Eagles	St Kilda	Croydon City Arrows	Plenty Valley Lions	Hampton Park United Sparrows	Surf Coast	Mount Waverley City	Heidelberg Stars	Rosebud	Lara United
2025	Keilor Park	Malvern City	Lalor United	St Kilda	Altona North	Waverley Wanderers	Manningham Juventus	Fawkner SC	Endeavour United	Balmoral FC	East Bentleigh	Meadow Park	Fortuna 60 SC	Newport Storm FC

=== 2026–present ===
Season	Division 1		Division 2		Division 3		Division 4		Division 5		Division 6		Division 7	
Season	North-West	South-East	North-West	South-East	North-West	South-East	North-West	South-East	North-West	South-East	North-West	South-East	North-West	South-East
2026	Geelong	South Springvale	FC Strathmore Split	Knox City FC	Balmoral FC	Heatherton United	Watsonia Heights FC	Ringwood City	Moonee Valley Knights SC	Monash City Villarreal FC	Hume Bulls FC	Old Ivanhoe SC	Murray United FC	Noble Suns FC

== See also ==
- National Premier Leagues Victoria
- Victorian Premier League
