= St Kilda SC =

St Kilda Celts
- Full name: St Kilda Soccer Club
- Nickname: Celts
- Founded: 2011; 15 years ago
- Ground: Elwood Park
- League: Victorian State League 2 South–East
- 2025: 1st (promoted); Victorian State League 1
- Website: Official website
Home colours	Away colours

The St Kilda Soccer Club is an Australian semi-professional association football (soccer) club based in the Melbourne suburb of Elwood. The club was founded in 2011 by the local Irish Australian community, that fields senior and junior teams for men and women operating under license from Football Victoria. Their first ever goal was scored by Derry star Oran Sexton. The club has no connection to either of the two previous clubs of the same name that competed in 1909–1934 and 1984–1991 respectively.

== Honours ==
=== League ===
- Fourth Division
  - Winners (2): 2016, 2025
- Fifth Division
  - Winners (3): 2015, 2022, 2024
- Sixth Division
  - Winners (2): 2013, 2014
- Eighth Division
  - Winners (1): 2012
