= Knox City FC =

Knox City
- Full name: Knox City Football Club
- Nickname: The Eagles
- Founded: 1951
- Ground: Egan Lee Reserve, Knoxfield
- Capacity: approx. 2,000
- League: Victorian State League Division 2
- 2017: 1st (promoted from State League 3)

Knox City Football Club (formerly Knox City Soccer Club) is an Australian association football club from Knoxfield, a suburb of Melbourne, Victoria. The club was formed as Bayswater Soccer Club in 1951 by German members of the Temple Society who had been sent to Australia for internment from Palestine. The club spent one season in the Victorian Premier League in 2004, however they were immediately relegated after finishing in last position. The club currently plays in Division 2 of the State League,

== Honours ==
- Victorian State League Division 1
  - Champions: 1991
  - Runners-up: 2003
- Victorian State League Division 2 South-East
  - Champions: 2001
  - Runners-up: 2000, 2008
- Victorian State League Division 3 South-East
  - Champions: 2017
- Victorian Metropolitan League Division 3
  - Champions: 1977
  - Runners-up: 1974
- Victorian Metropolitan League Division 4
  - Runners-up: 1972
