= Doncaster Rovers SC =

Doncaster Rovers
- Full name: Doncaster Rovers Soccer Club
- Nickname: Rovers
- Founded: 1967; 59 years ago
- Ground: Anderson Park, Doncaster East, Melbourne
- Capacity: 2,000 (200 seated)
- President: Jim Aspropotamidis
- Senior Coach: Damian Pagotto
- League: State League Division 2 South-East
- Website: http://www.doncasterrovers.org
Senior Home colours	Senior Away colours	Mini, Junior, VCFA colours

Doncaster Rovers Soccer Club is an Australian soccer club based in Doncaster East, Melbourne. Founded in 1967, the club currently participates in Victorian State League Division 2 South-East, Victorian Churches Football Association divisions and Football Victoria Junior and MiniRoos leagues. The club plays its home games at Anderson Park.

Its most successful period was in the 1990s, during which it spent the majority of the decade in Division 1 of the State League. In 1994 the club were crowned champions of Division 1 and subsequently promoted to the Victorian Premier League. However, after only one season in Victoria’s top flight they were immediately relegated after finishing second last in the league.

== Honours ==
- Victorian State League Division 2 South-East Champions: 1
  - 2012
- Victorian State League Division 2 South-East runner-up: 1
  - 2009
- Victorian State League Division 3 South-East runner-up: 1
  - 2003
- Victorian State League Division 1: 1
  - 1994
- Victorian Metropolitan League Division 4: 2
  - 1975, 1977
- Victorian Metropolitan League Division 3 runner-up: 1
  - 1978
