= Berwick City SC =

Berwick City Soccer Club
- Full name: Berwick City Soccer Club
- Founded: 1974
- Ground: Jack Thomas Reserve
- League: Victorian State League Division 2
- Website: www.berwickcitysc.com

Berwick City Soccer Club is an Australian association football club based in Berwick, Victoria, a suburb of Melbourne. Founded in 1974, the club fields men's, women's and junior teams in competitions organised by Football Victoria.

The club's senior teams compete in the Victorian State League Division 2, part of the Victorian football league system.

== History ==
Berwick City Soccer Club was founded in 1974 and represents the south-eastern Melbourne suburb of Berwick, located approximately 48 kilometres from Melbourne's central business district.

By the mid-2020s the club had around 730 registered players across more than 50 teams spanning junior and senior age groups.

In 2021 Berwick City joined the Melbourne City FC "City Clubs" community program, which provides grassroots clubs with access to development initiatives and club events.

In 2026 the club became the focus of the documentary series Breaking Barriers, produced by the Melbourne media agency Bruce and released through the football media platform Football360. The series follows the club's attempt to climb the Victorian football pyramid while advocating for the introduction of promotion and relegation into the men's A-League competition.

== Ground ==
Berwick City's primary home ground is Jack Thomas Reserve, located in Narre Warren North, Victoria. Some junior teams also train and play at Sweeney Reserve.

Both grounds received pavilion upgrades in 2018.

In 2022, upgrades to the pitches at Jack Thomas Reserve were proposed by the Victorian Liberal Party as a promise during the 2022 Victorian state election, including new synthetic playing surfaces and drainage improvements. However, the Liberal Party were not successful in winning government.
