= Croydon City Arrows SC =

Croydon City Arrows
- Full name: Croydon City Arrows Soccer Club
- Nicknames: The Arrows, City
- Founded: 1957
- Ground: Dorset Recreational Reserve
- Capacity: 3,000
- Club president: Jody Altmann
- Head Coach: John Gabrielson
- League: Victorian State League Division 3
- 2025: 6th
- Website: http://www.croydoncitysc.org.au
Home colours	Away colours

Croydon City Arrows is an Australian soccer club based in Croydon, Victoria, currently playing in the 5th tier of the Victorian association football structure and the seventh tier nationally. The club was established 1957 and has won two Victorian titles, in 1985 and 1986, and plays at the Dorset Recreational Reserve. The club was briefly known as Maroondah Arrows in 1997 and 1998.

Croydon City Arrows senior men's team currently participates in the Victorian State League Division 3 East.

Croydon City Arrows senior women's team currently participates in the Victorian State League Division 1 South-East.

== Notable former players ==
- Daniel Allsopp – Former Socceroo, ex-Melbourne Victory and Manchester City striker
- Jimmy Rooney – 1974 World Cup Socceroo
- Peter Ollerton – 1974 World Cup Socceroo
- Paul Wade – Former Socceroos Captain '86-96
- Marcus Stergiopoulos - Former Gippsland Falcons, South Melbourne, Lincoln City FC, and Bradford City wing-back
- Manny Gelagotis - Former Gippsland Falcons defender
