= Banyule City SC =

- Full name: Banyule City Soccer Club
- Nickname: Bulls
- Founded: 1969; 57 years ago as Rosanna
- Ground: Yallambie Park Reserve & Banyule Flats Reserve
- Capacity: 400
- League: Victorian State League 1 North West
- 2024: 4th
- Website: https://www.banyulecitysc.com.au/

Banyule City SC is an Australian soccer club from Viewbank. Banyule City plays their matches in the Victorian State League Division 1.

It sits at Level 3 on the Victorian league system (Level 4 of the overall Australian league system)

== History ==
Banyule City SC was founded as Rosanna in 1969. The club changed its name to Banyule City in 1995.

== Honours ==
- Victorian State League Division 2 North-West Champions 2015
- Victorian Provisional League Division One Runners Up 1982
- Victorian Provisional Division Three Champions 1981
- Victorian State League Division 3 North-West Champions 2009
- Victorian League Division 4 Champions 1985
- Victorian State League Division 4 Runners Up 1993

== Ex-Players ==
- (Scotland) George Campbell (1997-1998)
