= Geelong SC =

Geelong Soccer Club
- Full name: Geelong Soccer Club
- Nicknames: Makedonia, GSC, Geelong Mak, Lions
- Founded: 1958; 68 years ago
- Ground: Winslow Park
- Capacity: 3,000
- Chairman: Robert Kukanovski
- Head Coach: Ross Harvey
- League: Victorian State League 1 North–West
- 2026: 1st of 14 (promoted), VPL 2
- Website: geelongsc.com
Home colours	Away colours

Geelong Soccer Club (Formerly Geelong Makedonia, West Geelong, East Geelong) is an Australian soccer club based in Geelong, Australia founded in 1958 by Geelong's Macedonian Australian community.

In 2019, Geelong SC obtained National Premier Leagues Victoria status after being crowned 2018 champions of Football Victoria State League 1 North-West. Geelong SC is based at Winslow Park which is located in the Stead Park Sports Precinct in Corio, Victoria and is strongly supported by the Macedonian community of Geelong.

== History ==
=== Early history ===
The Geelong Soccer Club was established in the early 1950s as a way of playing soccer and socialising.

Not long after the club was established, it began competing in the local Geelong and Ballarat Soccer League where it experienced local success.

In the early seventies the club was promoted to the Victorian Provisional League and later gained promotion to the Victorian State League.

In 1994, East Geelong Soccer Club moved to Stead Park after forming a merger with the old Geelong Soccer and Sports Club. The merger saw the club retain the Geelong Soccer and Sports Club name while replacing the former Geelong Soccer and Sports Club logo with a new Macedonian Lion logo.

Since the season of 1968, the club has won 10 championships. The championships were won in the following seasons: 1968 – 1969 – 1970 – 1976 – 1980 – 1988 – 1996 – 1998 – 2016 – 2018.

=== 2015-2019 – From State League 2 to National Premier Leagues ===
Geelong had a strong second half of the State League 2 North-West season in 2015 after the mid-season appointment of former West Ham Utd and Sydney FC player Stevie Laurie who promptly brought in Scottish central defender Marc McCafferty, but the poor first couple of months meant that the ambitious outfit had to settle for 6th place. In the 2015 FFA Cup preliminary rounds, Geelong beat Waverley Wanderers 5–0, Hoppers Crossing 3–1 and Westgate FC 3–1 to progress to the fifth qualifying round. There, they met National Premier Leagues Victoria powerhouse Hume City FC, going down at ABD Stadium.

Geelong SC went on a heavy recruiting spree to aid its push for promotion in season 2016. The club attracted high-profile players included former A-League players İsyan Erdogan, Nick Kalmar, Dulie Delic, former Hull City player Tom Matthews, Glasgow Rangers youth product Ross Harvey, former Australian U17 Joey representative Brodie Paterson, Scottish striker Sean McIlroy and former Chile youth international Carlos Espinoza. With the star-studded squad, Geelong steamrolled its way to the State 2 North-West title, securing promotion to State League 1 with 4 rounds to spare. Geelong SC were crowned champions in the penultimate round of the season after making light work of Corio SC 3–0 in the seasons Geelong derby. After the conclusion of the 2016 season, Steve Laurie left his position as head coach of the club.

In 2017 rookie coach Kristian Bright was thrust into limelight after the short-lived tenure of Head Coach Fabrizio Soncin. The newly promoted State League 1 side added further stealth to its squad with players also leaving from the 2016 squad. With the notable additions of Canadian-Polish sharp shooter Daniel Kuczynski from Icelandic club KF Grindavik, cavaliering Italian defender Kevin Martin, former Wollongong Wolves custodian Daniel Collison, Papua New Guinea national football team captain and most capped player Michael Foster, George Slefendorfas and Harry Hillary-Jenkins. Geelong SC got the 2017 season off to a flyer with four consecutive wins, including a 4–2 win over sister-club and former NSL heavyweight Preston Lions in Round 1 that coincided with the unveiling of the clubs new multi-million dollar purpose-built football complex at Stead Park, Corio. Another highlight of the 2017 season was the 4-0 Round 18 victory over fellow Macedonian backed club and eventual champions Altona Magic. Geelong SC completed its first ever season of Football Victoria State League One with a creditable 2nd-place finish narrowly missing out on promotion to NPL. Star recruit Kuczynski was the side's top goalscorer with 18 goals.

In 2018 Geelong SC's board set its sights on promotion to National Premier Leagues Victoria 2. The much publicised and controversial signings of Matt Townley and Matthew Thorne from rivals North Geelong Warriors were a signal of the clubs intent. The arrival of several international players including Dan Hattersley, Andrew Fitzgerald and Sam Mason-Smith (England), Gonzalo Aguero (Spain), Takanori Nishimoto (Japan), Raymond Gunemba (PNG), Scott Robson, Aaron Spain and Zane Sole (all NZ) further strengthened the squad already boasting names such as Louis Bentley, Izzy Erdogan, Dulie Delic, Daniel Kuczynski (CAN), Harry Hillary-Jenkins, Chris Balaburova, Josh Talev and Vedran Stojanovic.

The untimely resignation of Head Coach Kristian Bright three rounds into the season and a points deduction for an administrative blunder put the club behind the eight-ball early in the promotion plight. The interim appointment of ex-Assistant Coach of Melbourne Victory Darren Davies followed by the permanent appointment of NPL winning coach Domenic Barba coincided with an unbeaten run of 8 games set up what was to be a historic season for the Lions. A bad mid-season run and a fast finishing Preston Lions outfit eventually culminated in a Round 21 'grand final' type decider. The date of 2 September 2018, the most memorable day in the clubs 60-year history. With world-class goals from Sam Mason-Smith and Matt Townley Geelong SC secured a historic 2–0 victory against Preston Lions at their B.T. Connor Reserve. In front of a reported 4000 spectators the team secured the State League 1 championship and the promotion to the National Premier Leagues Victoria 2. At the conclusion of the season, championship-winning head coach Domenic Barba resigned from his position.

The debut NPL season in 2019 saw a major squad rebuild with the appointment of former Brunswick City Head Coach George Karkaletsis taking the reins. The arrival of experienced NPL players Melvin Beckett, Adamson Agayi and Michael Trigger, as well as Romanian defender Bogdan Nicolescu from Politecnica Timisoara. On 25 March 2019 Geelong SC issued a public statement confirming that Karkaletsis had departed the club after 6 league games in charge which featured losses to Werribee City 4–0, Murray United 3–1, a disappointing 2–2 draw at Whittlesea Ranges and a 4–2 loss to city rivals North Geelong Warriors in front of a massive crowd in the first ever Geelong NPL Derby. On 28 March 2019, the previous season's title winning coach Domenic Barba was confirmed as his replacement, initially on an interim basis. Barba vacated the position of Head Coach by mutual consent after a 1–0 loss to Northcote City FC. Assistant Coach Gabriel Markaj took over as interim head coach for the remaining 4 games of a relegation dogfight (NPL2 restructure 7th position down relegated to NPL3) only succumbing in the last 17 mins of the season to Brunswick City after a galant effort beating Goulburn Valley Suns and Ballarat City and a draw with eventual champion St. Albans Saints.

== Current squad ==
=== First-team ===
Note: Flags indicate national team as defined under FIFA eligibility rules; some limited exceptions apply. Players may hold more than one non-FIFA nationality.

No.	Pos.	Nation	Player
1	GK	AUS	Thomas Josifovski
2	DF	AUS	Joe Lawless
7	MF	AUS	Alex Stojanovski
9	FW	BRA	Bruno Gervasoni
10	MF	ITA	Giovanni Calosi
12	DF	AUS	Jake Talevski
13	DF	AUS	Liam O’Connell

No.	Pos.	Nation	Player
14	MF	AUS	Keegan Kukanovski
16	MF	AUS	Jedd Tanic
18	DF	AUS	Jack McTaggart
19	FW	AUS	Michael Yoseski
21	GK	AUS	Karl Zilic
23	DF	NIR	Rory McKeown
—	MF	AUS	Harun Aktas
—	MF	AUS	Anthony Trajkovski

== Divisional history ==
- Victoria Premier League 2 2027–
- Victorian State League Division 1 N/W 2026
- Victoria Premier League 2 2025
- Victorian State League Division 1 N/W 2024
- NPL Victoria 3 2020–2023
- NPL Victoria 2 West 2019
- Victorian State League Division 1 N/W 2017–2018
- Victorian State League Division 2 N/W 2014–2016
- Victorian State League Division 3 N/W 2012–2013
- Victorian State League Division 2 N/W 2011
- Victorian State League Division 3 N/W 2006–2010
- Victorian State League Division 2 N/W 2000–2005
- Victorian State League Division 2 1999
- Victorian State League Division 3 1997–1998
- Victorian State League Division 4 1994–1996
- Victorian State League Division 3 1992–1993
- Victorian State League Division 2 1991

== Affiliated clubs ==
Geelong SC has sister-club relationships with Preston Lions FC and Altona Magic.

== See also ==
- Australian football (soccer) league system
- Geelong Regional Football Committee
