= FC Clifton Hill =

Clifton Hill
- Full name: Football Club Clifton Hill
- Nickname: Hillmen
- Founded: 1975
- Ground: Quarries Park, Clifton Hill, Victoria
- Capacity: 2000
- Chairman: Michael Tyrikos
- Senior Mens Manager: Nick Georgakopoulos
- League: Victorian State League Division 1
- 2024: 11th
- Website: www.fccliftonhill.org
Home colours	Away colours

FC Clifton Hill are an Australian association football club which currently plays in the Victorian State League Division 1, the 5th tier of Association football in Victoria and the 6th tier in Australia. They were founded in 1975.

== History ==
Founded in 1975 FC Clifton Hill has had much success over the years, moving up through district (League winners 1976) and provisional leagues competitions, before finally hitting the Victorian State League Division 2 in 1999. They moved all over the place through the conference style division, before finally achieving promotion to the Victorian State League Division 1 in 2007 after winning the Division 2 championship that season.

== Team Mascot ==
Years	Mascot
2005- 2017- FCCH SSG Kids
2004–2005	Rusty
2000–2003	Jack

== Club Ties ==
The club maintains tenuous links to Crystal Palace via a bi-annual Australian based supporters trip.

After 7 years without any losses, the season 2013 bore witness to a 0–1 loss to Noble Park. The supporters trip has now not seen CHU score for in excess of 300 minutes.

There is also a mutual relationship with Heidelberg United due to the Greek Heritage of both clubs.

== Current Senior Men's squad ==
Note: Flags indicate national team as defined under FIFA eligibility rules; some limited exceptions apply. Players may hold more than one non-FIFA nationality.

No.	Pos.	Nation	Player
1	GK	AUS	Christopher Theodoridis
2	DF	SDN	Emmanuel Chol
3	DF	AUS	James Conversano
4	DF	ENG	James Neighbour
5	MF	ENG	Tom Reilly
6	MF	SCO	Chris Reid
7	FW	WAL	Gavin Jones
8	MF	MAR	Abdel Deroune
9	FW	ENG	Edward Palmer

No.	Pos.	Nation	Player
10	MF	AUS	Mohammad Reza
11	MF	WAL	Joe Hunt
12	MF	ENG	Harry Newman
13	DF	AUS	Sami Nour
14	MF	ENG	Harry Noon (Captain)
15	DF	URU	Matías Correa
16	DF	BRA	Fabio Alboquerque
17	MF	ENG	James Foster
23	MF	ENG	Ethan Hodby
27	MF	MAS	Enel Tan

== Current Senior Women's captain ==
Note: Flags indicate national team as defined under FIFA eligibility rules; some limited exceptions apply. Players may hold more than one non-FIFA nationality.

No.	Pos.	Nation	Player
8	MF	AUS	Charlie Doukas (Captain)

== Honors ==
- Victorian State League Division 2 North-West Winners 2023
- VSF District League 2 Winners 1976 (Victoria (state)) Hellenic Cup – Runners Up: 1985, 1992.
- Women's State League 3 Runners up 2021, 2022 (Promoted)
