= Fawkner SC =

Fawkner Soccer Club
- Full name: Fawkner Soccer Club
- Nicknames: FSC, Blues
- Founded: 1967
- Ground: CB Smith Reserve, Fawkner, Victoria
- Capacity: 1,500
- Coach: Nino Ragusa
- League: Victorian State League Division 3
- 2022: 4th

Fawkner Soccer Club is an Australian soccer club from Fawkner, a suburb of Melbourne, Victoria. The club was formed in 1967 by local Italian Australians after Fawkner SC separated from Fawkner Blues now known as Manningham United FC. After being granted full ownership of CB Smith Reserve the re-branded Fawkner Soccer Club fielded their rebuilt senior side in 2012. In 2015, Fawnker were crowned champions of the State League Division 4 North, earning promotion to the State League Division 3 North-West.

== Honours ==
- Men's State League Division 4 North Champions 2015
- Men's State League Division 5 North Runners Up 2013

== Individual honours ==
Men's State League 5 North Best & Fairest

- 2013 – Vincenzo Ierardo
