= Albion Rovers FC (Cairnlea) =

Albion Rovers (FC Football club)
- Full name: Albion Rovers Football Club
- Nickname: Albion Boys
- Founded: 1969; 57 years ago, as Royal Park Soccer Club
- Ground: Kevin Flint Memorial Reserve
- Capacity: 1000
- President: (Australia) Hikmet Mapolar
- Coach: (Australia) Salih Sozer
- Assistant Coach: (Australia)
- League: Victorian State League Division 2 N/W
- 2026: 8th
- Website: http://www.albionroversfc.com.au
Home colours	Away colours

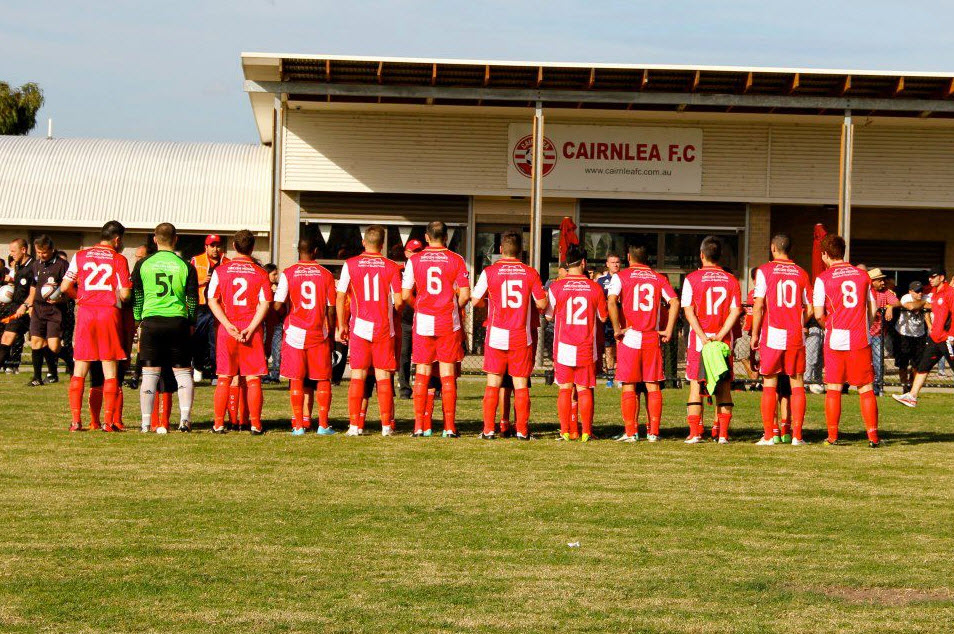
Typical match day at Cairnlea Park

Albion Rovers FC is a football (soccer) club based in Cairnlea, Victoria, Australia. The club was formed by the amalgamation of Royal Park Soccer Club and Albion Rovers Soccer Club in 1985. Since this time, the club has enjoyed success playing at the highest levels in Victorian football including finals campaigns in the Victorian Premier League (VPL), a host of Victorian State League titles and many League Cups. A combined five league titles between the Men and Women's team have given the club the most successful record of any Turkish backed club in Australian history. Currently the club's Senior Men team play in the Victorian State League Division 2 N/W competition.

== History ==
Royal Park Soccer club was first formed in 1969 by the members of the Cyprus Turkish Association which consisted of first and second generation Turkish Cypriots. Some members of the association suggested that efforts towards other projects such as building a new mosque was more beneficial for the Turkish community before the establishment of a sporting club. However, after much deliberation the association decided that a sports and recreation club would not only provide an opportunity to engage the Turkish Cypriot community, but a better means of migrating its people into the Australian community – hence the club was born.

An initial sum of $500 was allocated towards the establishment costs of the Soccer club. The money allocated went towards purchasing essentials such as soccer balls, netting for the goals and other necessities. The first initial matches were organised friendly games against other nationality clubs. These games were played in Carlton at Princess Park on the famous Ground Number 6 and the majority of the players from Royal Park came from the Cyprus Turkish Association. The team was also known to have a few skillful players of Albanian background. Royal Park Soccer Club joined the Victorian Amateur Soccer Federation entering at the lowest division in the season of 1969. A one dollar fee was charged to the players per game to cover their insurance and other playing costs. The team would travel as far as rural Mornington to officially compete against other clubs.

The following year, Royal Park Soccer Club began to attract the interest of the new immigrants from Turkey. The club decided to register several experienced immigrant players who had played professionally in the Turkish football leagues in hope that the experience would bring much improved team performances. At the end of the season Royal Park achieved promotion much to the delight of the Turkish Cypriot community. The level of community support for the team could be measured by the increased number of spectator cars parked around the ground, beeping horns, flashing lights and cheering the team on match days.

Several years later in 1986, Royal Park Soccer Club and the Cyprus Turkish Association decided to relocate to Sunshine after the sale of the club building. Royal Park merged with Scottish side Albion Rovers Soccer Club which was based at Selywn Park, Albion, and playing in the Victorian State League Division 1. The new club provided excellent facilities including a large clubroom, change room and generous grandstand, however the amalgamation was seen as a logical move as it allowed the club to grow amongst the local Turkish Cypriot community.

After a season of power-sharing between the Turkish Cypriots and Scots, an AGM was called to determine the future of the soccer club. A members vote resulted in the election of a new Turkish president and the club would be known as Albion Rovers Turk Gucu Soccer Club. Over the next few seasons the club grew and Selwyn park often attracted large crowds in excess of 1000 people. By the late 1980s, the Scots interest in the administration of the club declined, despite a promotion to the Victorian Premier League (VPL) in 1989. The Scots opted to take a minority role in running the club but remained as loyal supporters. The Turkish Cypriot club members then decided to acknowledge its Scottish heritage by adopting a young Scottish man with a minor mental impairment as its club mascot. The young man known as "Johhny" would lead the team out on match days, sit with the team on the substitutes bench, as well as display his silky skills at half time much to the delight of the faithful.

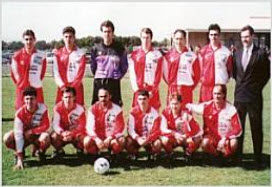
Albion Redsox Soccer Club Senior team circa 1995

In 1994, the Soccer club changed its name to the Albion Redsox which coincided with a renewed push from soccer authorities to force clubs to market themselves to mainstream Australia, as opposed to their own mostly migrant fan bases. The name change also coincided with the club celebrating its 25th anniversary in 1995, which allowed the members and supporters to reflect on its foundations and past successes. The celebrations were capped off with the club recording its most impressive season in history with a 5th-place finish in the VPL and a berth in the final series.

In 1997, the Albion Redsox were forced into move away from Selwyn Park after a dispute with the Council in the sharing of the facilities at Selwyn Park. Limited opportunities in finding a new home meant the club would take an offer from the Melton Shire Council to base itself out of McPherson Park in Melton. The move, which was approximately 25 km away from its current base, would include a name change as the club would be known as the Melton Reds. The relocation seemed viable at the time but a significant decline in the club's supporter base and revenues would prove detrimental to the club. The Reds were relegated from the VPL after a disappointing year however the club would continue the suffering with back to back relegation in 1998.

In 1999, the Albion Reds Soccer club decided to change its name to be known as the Satellite City Rovers in a bid to attract new interest to the club. The change lasted until the end following season where the club continued its struggle to survive. As a result, in 2001 the club ended its lease early with Melton Shire council and temporarily relocated back closer to its original home of Selwyn Park. The temporary move would see the club base themselves at the home of the Sunshine George Cross Soccer club in Sunshine, Victoria as the Rovers continued to struggle in finding a new base close to its original home of Selywn Park. The club eventually relocated to the Calabria club in Uniting Lane, Bulla where facilities including a car park, clubroom and reception center were available. It was probably another key decision to see the return of the Albion Rovers Soccer club name that attracted some of the club's loyal supporter base to return. The 2001 season ended in success as the club went on to be crowned champions of Victorian State League Division 2 North West. The successful season was topped off with Mustafa Mustafa winning the Victorian State League Division 2 Player of the Year, and it would be the same player who would back up the seasons performance by winning the Victorian State League Division 1 Player of the Year in season 2002.

In 2003, the club would begin another turbulent period in its history. A change of ownership and lack of support resulted in the Rovers being relegated to below division, however the suffering would continue with back to back relegation in 2004. While the Soccer club was to stabilise in the following season, underlying problems remained with a lack of support and finances, so another move was decided by the club owners. The Rovers relocated to temporarily base themselves out of Green Gully Reserve in 2006, where the club's juniors were based, while negotiations took place on a potential new permanent home. The 2006 season would see the club miss out on promotion by a single point.

It was in 2007, after much negotiation and assistance from the Brimbank City Council and in particular Mayor Natalie Suleyman, the Soccer club would be awarded brand new facilities at the home of Cairnlea Park in Cairnlea. The new home would feature two football grounds with extensive lighting, a large clubroom, 4 change rooms and large car park. The move included formally changing the club's name to Cairnlea FC. The move also reinvigorated the club and its members, and season 2007 saw the club achieve promotion after finishing second in the Victorian State League Division 3 North West. The success was short lived and the step up proved a difficult task for the club as a second bottom finish resulted in relegation from Victorian State League Division 2 North West in 2008.

However, it was during this time Cairnlea FC decided to invest on its up-and-coming Senior Girls' football team. The girls begun to emerge as a powerhouse of female football in the western suburbs of Melbourne. In remarkable fashion, the Senior Girls' would go on a run of back to back promotion in years 2009, 2010 and 2011 under the guidance of former player and 2012 Brimbank Coach of the Year, Mustafa Fehmi. The success paved the way for the Girls' team to compete in the Victorian Women's Premier League – the highest possible state league for woman. The club's girls' team were able to backed up their impressive performances by winning the annual Brimbank Cup in years 2012, 2013 and 2014.

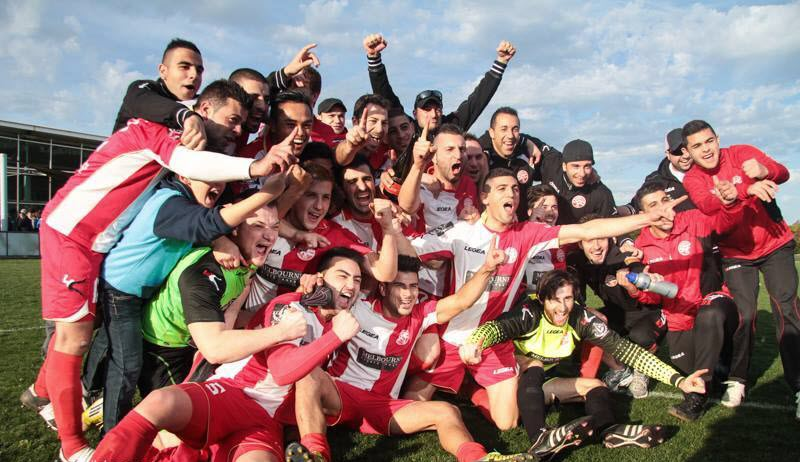
Cairnlea FC champions 2013

In 2013, the club added another promotion by finishing champions of Victorian State League Division 3 North West in remarkable fashion. The season included a 10-game unbeaten run that ended on the final day of the season where Cairnlea FC would travel away from home requiring one point to finish first. The season was capped off with multiple player awards including the leagues Golden boot winner Adem Alicevic with 18 goals and runner-up teammate Adamson Ajayi with 17. The club captain Mustafa Mustafa was awarded Victorian State League Division 3 Player of the Year Award. This was the first time in Cairnlea FC history, and only the second time since its amalgamation with the Albion Rovers Soccer Club that it had won a championship.

The following year in 2014, Football Victoria introduced the National Premier Leagues Victoria competition, which resulted in a restructure for the state leagues. As a result of achieving promotion, the club was moved up into State League 1, now the third tier of football in the state, finishing in fourth.

A change in committee and direction in 2015 saw the club once again relegated to State League 2 in where it currently resides.

In 2018, after the resignations of the existing committee, a new executive board and committee was assembled in an attempt to stabilise the club. As part of the new committees 5-year strategy (2018–2022), the club changed its name back to Albion Rovers FC and updated its logo. This coincided with the club's 50th anniversary and was seen as an important step to reconnect with the club's identity.

== Club name changes ==
- 1969 – Royal Park Soccer Club
- 1985 – Albion Rovers Soccer Club
- 1986 – Albion Turk Gucu Soccer Club
- 1994 – Albion Redsox Soccer Club
- 1997 – Melton Reds Soccer Club
- 1999 – Satellite City Rovers Soccer Club
- 2001 – Albion Rovers Soccer Club
- 2007 – Cairnlea Football Club
- 2019 – Albion Rovers Football Club

== Honours ==
=== Club ===
==== Men ====
- Victorian Premier League

Finalists (1): 1995

- Victorian State League Division 1

Champions (1): 1977
Runners-up (2): 1981, 1989

- Victorian State League Division 2

Champions (1): 2001
Runners-up (1): 1973

- Victorian State League Division 3

Champions (2): 1966, 2013
Runners-up (2): 2007, 2013

- Victorian State League Division 4

Runners-up (1): 1965

- Victorian State League Cup

Winners (1): 1976, 1987

- Victorian Federation Cup

Winners (1): 1974

- Turkish Cup - Atatürk Kupasi

Winners (1): 2007

==== Women ====
- Victorian State League Division 1

Champions (1): 2011

- Victorian State League Division 2

Champions (1): 2010

- Victorian State League Division 3

Champions (1): 2009

- Brimbank Cup

Winners (2): 2012, 2013

- Turkish Cup - Atatürk Kupasi

Winners (1): 2009

=== Individual ===
Victorian State League Division 1 Player of the Year

- 2002 – Mustafa Mustafa (footballer)

Victorian State League Division 2 Player of the Year

- 2001 – Mustafa Mustafa (footballer)

Victorian State League Division 3 Player of the Year

- 2013 – Mustafa Mustafa (footballer)

Victorian State League Division 1 Golden boot

- 2014 – Leon Osei

Victorian State League Division 2 Golden Boot

- 2023 – Jack Fox

Victorian State League Division 3 Golden Boot

- 2013 – Adem Alicevic
