= Keilor Park SC =

- Full name: Keilor Park Soccer Club
- Nickname: The Eagles
- Founded: 1957
- Ground: Keilor Park Reserve, Keilor Park
- Capacity: 2,000
- Chairman: (Australia) Paul Portelli
- Head coach: (Australia) Sergio Sabbadini
- League: Victoria Premier League 2
- 2026: 5th of 12
- Website: https://keilorparksc.com.au/
Home colours	Away colours

Keilor Park Soccer Club is an Australian soccer club based in Keilor Park, Melbourne. The club currently competes in the Victoria Premier League 2.

== History ==
The Keilor Park Soccer Club was originally established in 1957, at the Blue Cellar Restaurant in Fitzroy from where the club's administration was conducted until 1961. The club originally appointed two club administrators to organise the formation and structure of the club and election of the first Committee. According to club records, the first official game of soccer was played in 1958. Keilor's first home ground was at Royal Park, behind the current Royal Children's Hospital. The Club then moved on a number of occasions from Royal Park to Elwood, Footscray, Maribyrnong and finally to today's home ground at Keilor Park Reserve. In the mid to late sixties, the first ideas about locating the club to Keilor were formed. It was a hard and painstaking process which brought the club into severe difficulties. The club was allocated some land at Keilor Park Reserve in 1974 and held its first working bee in 1975. The first official training night was held at Keilor Park on 3 February 1976 with the first home game against Doveton on 3 July of the same year. The Club remains based at Keilor Park Recreational Reserve. Keilor Soccer Club amalgamated with Sunshine Park in 1997 to form Keilor Park SC.

The club was originally backed by the Austrian Australian community, and the club's colours of purple and white are inspired by FK Austria Wien. The club is today backed by Maltese Australian community.
