= List of Melbourne Victory FC players =

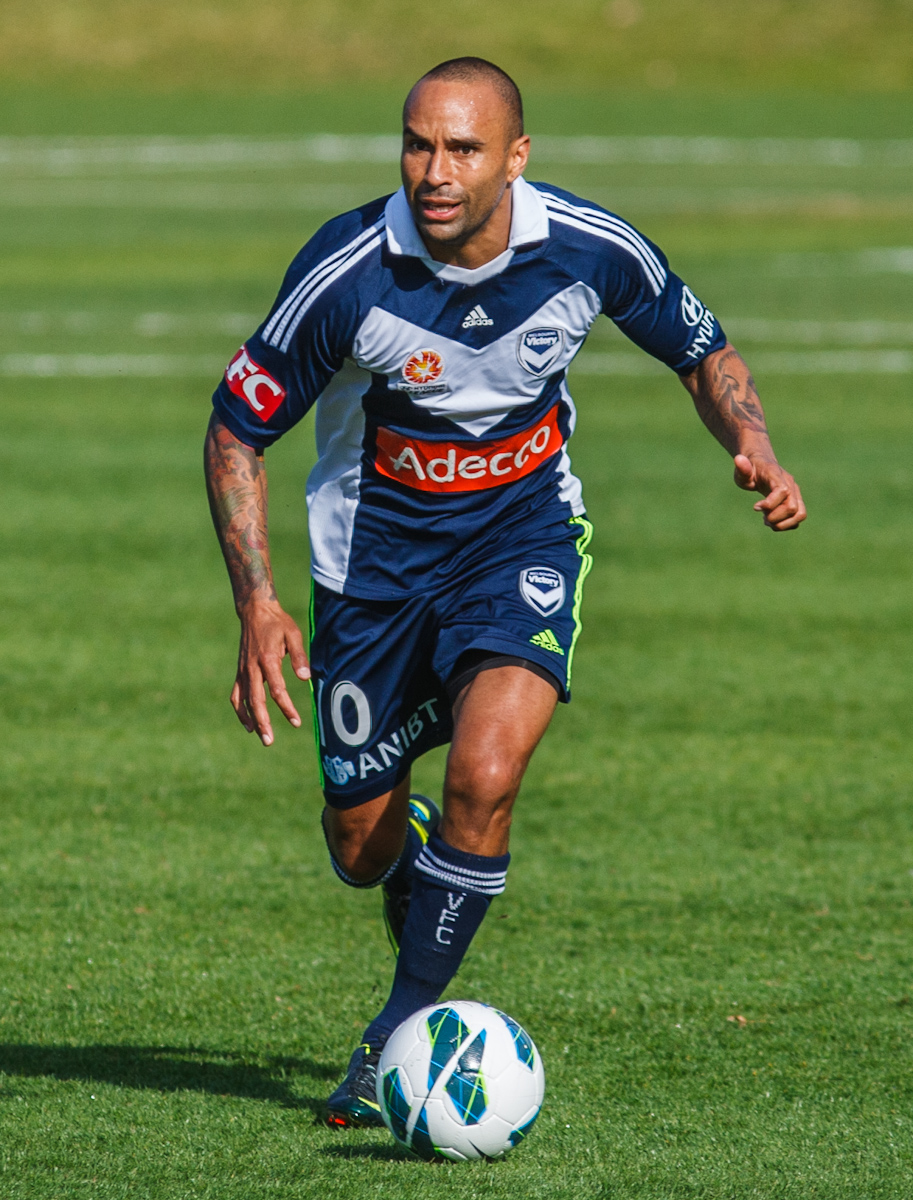
Archie Thompson had 262 appearances for the Victory from 2005 to 2016

Melbourne Victory Football Club, an Australian association football club based in Melbourne, Victoria, was founded in 2004. They became the only Victorian team in the inaugural seasons of the A-League, a professional football competition which commenced in 2005. The club's first team has competed in numerous nationally and internationally organised competitions, and all players who have played in one or more such match are listed below.

Leigh Broxham holds the record for the greatest number of appearances for Melbourne Victory. From 2005 to date, the Australian defender has played 375 times for the club. As of 2020, fourteen other players have made more than 100 appearances for Melbourne. The club's goalscoring record is held by Archie Thompson, who scored 97 goals in all competitions between 2005 and 2016.

== Key ==
- The list is ordered first by date of debut, and then if necessary in alphabetical order.
- Appearances as a substitute are included.
- Statistics are correct up to and including 18 September 2020. Where a player left the club permanently after this date, his statistics are updated to his date of leaving.

Positions key
GK	Goalkeeper
DF	Defender
MF	Midfielder
FW	Forward

Nationality
Unless otherwise noted, the nationality of a player is determined by the country/countries which he has played for, or if said person has not played international football, their country of birth.
Position
Playing positions are listed according to the tactical formations that were employed at the time.
Club career
Club career is defined as the first and last calendar years in which the player appeared for the club in any of the competitions listed below.
Total appearances and Total goals
Total appearances and goals comprise those in the A-League, AFC Champions League, FFA Cup, A-League Pre-Season Challenge Cup and 2005 Australian Club World Championship Qualifying Tournament.

== Players ==
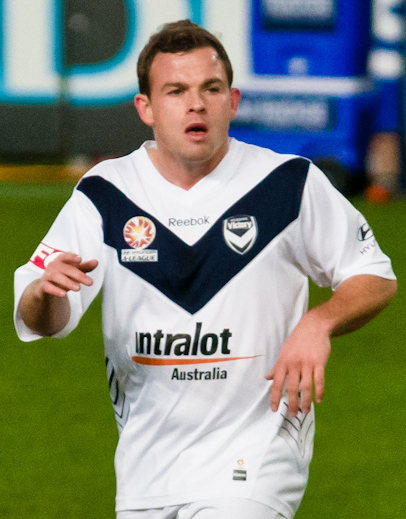
Leigh Broxham has the record for the most appearances for the Victory

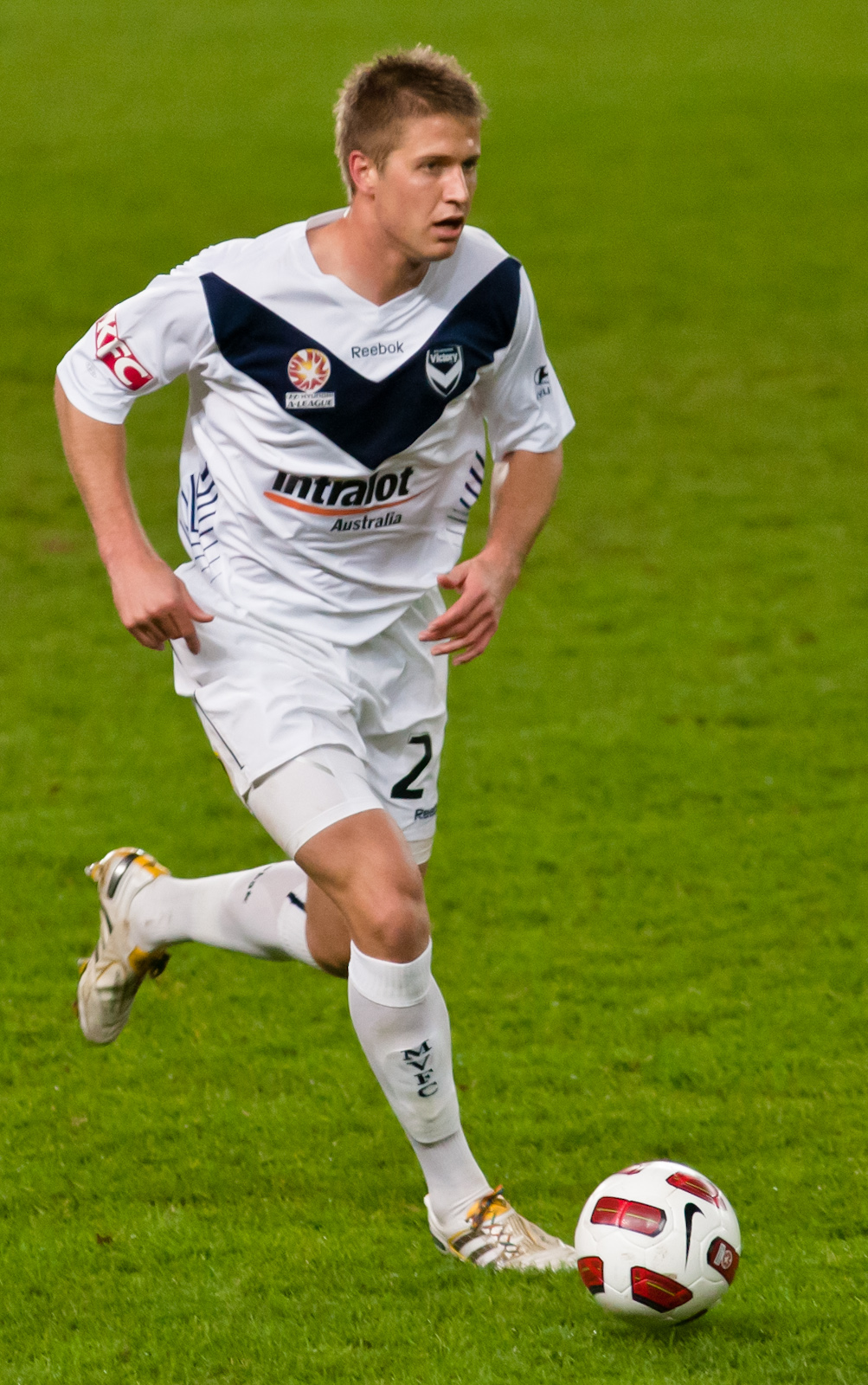
Adrian Leijer had 205 appearances over two spells with the Victory

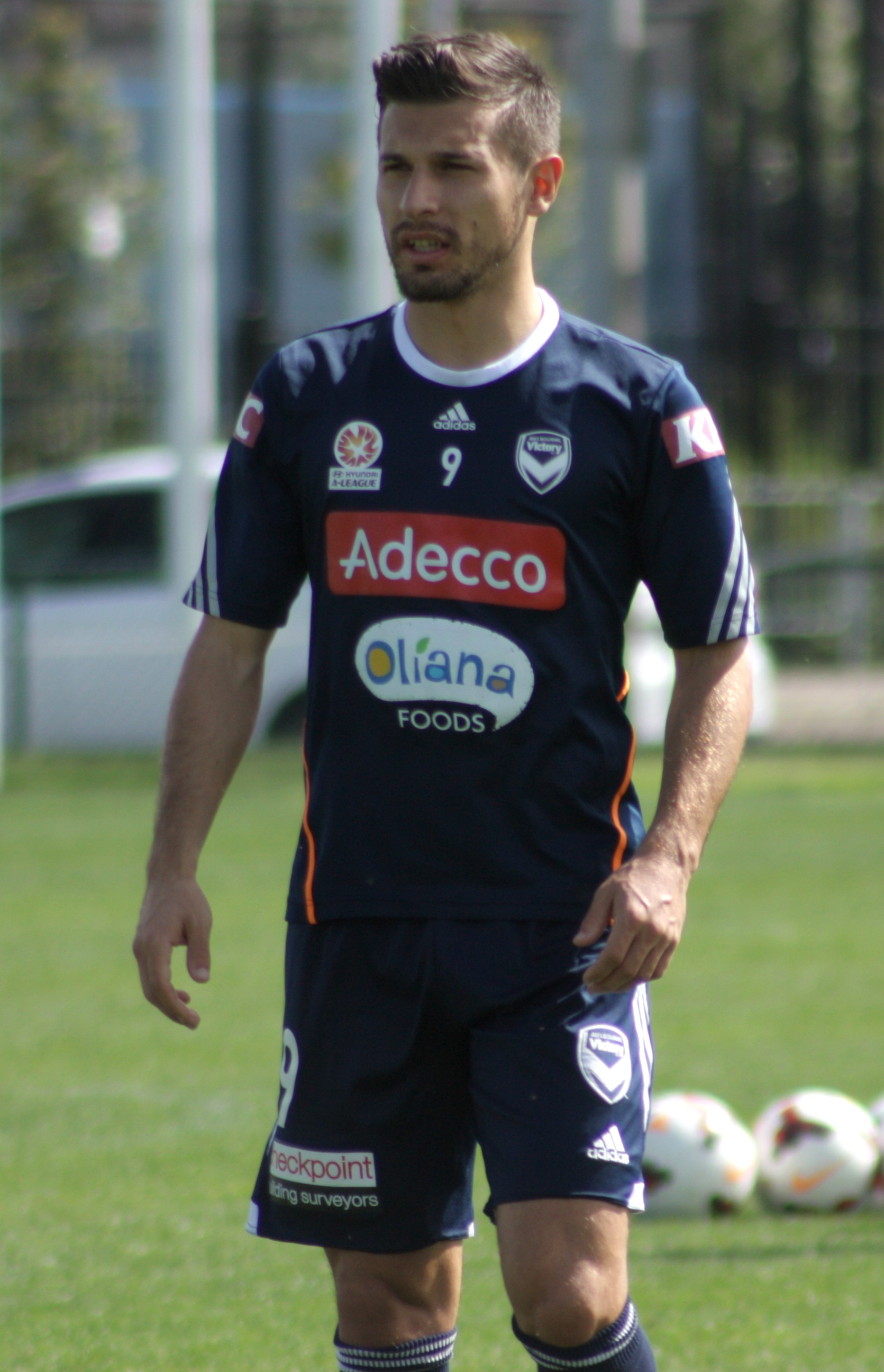
Kosta Barbarouses had 161 appearances over two spells with Melbourne

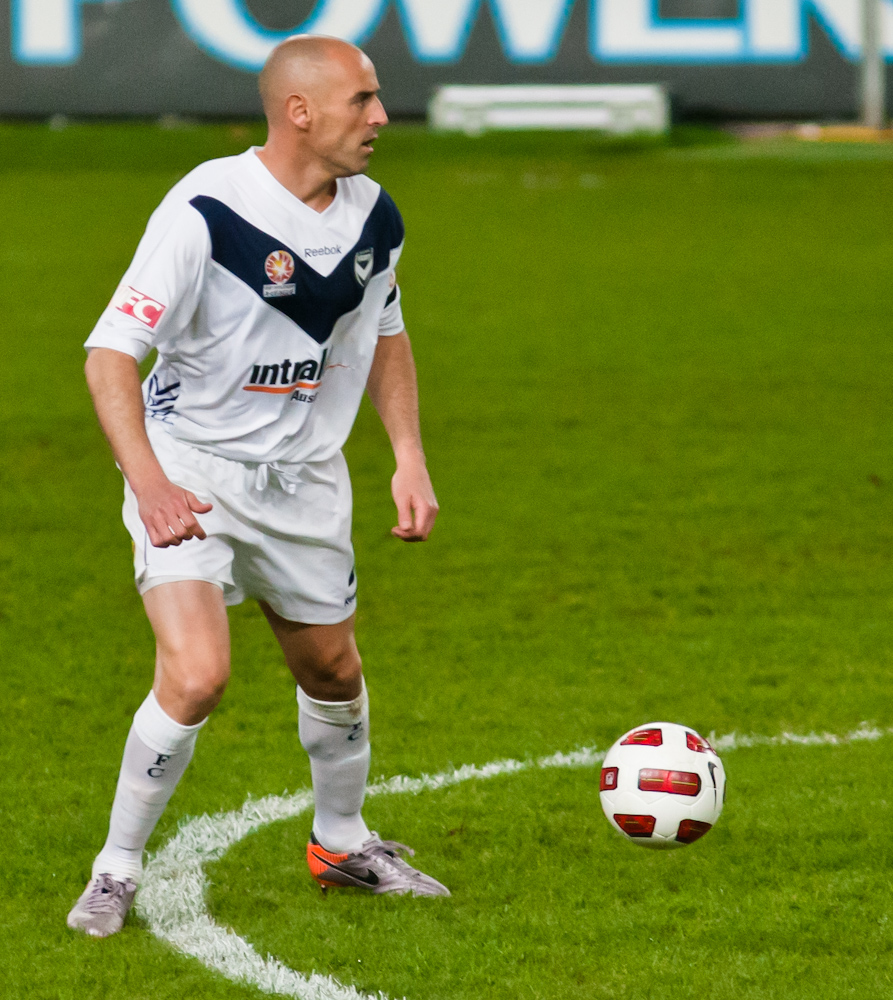
Kevin Muscat had 151 appearances for the Victory from 2005 to 2011

Table of players, including nationalities, positions and appearance details
Player	Nationality	Position	Club career	Starts	Subs	Total	Goals	Ref
Danny Allsopp	Australia	FW	2005–2009; 2011–2012	131	18	149	50	
Mark Byrnes	Australia	DF	2005–2007	21	4	25	2	
Ricky Diaco	Australia	FW	2005–2006	3	14	17	1	
Spase Dilevski	Australia	U	2005; 2012–2013	6	9	15	1	
Adrian Leijer	Australia	DF	2005–2007; 2009–2015	202	3	205	8	
Vince Lia	Australia	MF	2005–2007	10	20	30	0	
Steve Pantelidis	Australia	U	2005–2008	58	13	71	0	
Kristian Sarkies	Australia	MF	2005–2007	28	16	44	3	
Simon Storey	Australia	DF	2005–2007	32	6	38	0	
Chris Tadrosse	Australia	U	2005–2006	2	9	11	0	
Michael Theoklitos	Australia	GK	2005–2009	89	0	89	0	
Matthew Spiranovic	Australia	DF	2005; 2021-	0	1	1	0	
Leigh Broxham	Australia	U	2005–	318	62	380	7	
Daniel Visevic	Australia	MF	2005	0	1	1	0	
Geoffrey Claeys	Belgium	U	2005–2006	20	0	20	0	
Michael Ferrante	Australia	MF	2005–2007	24	7	31	1	
Eugene Galekovic	Australia	GK	2005–2007	22	0	22	0	
Richard Kitzbichler	Austria	MF	2005–2006	20	2	22	5	
Daniel Piorkowski	Australia	DF	2005–2007	38	2	40	0	
Archie Thompson	Australia	FW	2005–2016	226	36	262	97	
Carl Recchia	Australia	U	2005–2006	11	4	15	0	
Kevin Muscat	Australia	DF	2005–2011	151	0	151	35	
Andrew Vlahos	Australia	U	2005–2006	14	7	21	0	
Ramazan Tavşancıoğlu	Australia	U	2006	2	2	4	0	
Grant Brebner	Scotland	MF	2006–2012	109	26	135	6	
Adrian Caceres	Australia	U	2006–2008	33	22	55	6	
Claudinho	Brazil	MF	2006	3	7	10	1	
Fred	Brazil	MF	2006–2007	25	0	25	4	
Rodrigo Vargas	Australia	DF	2006–2012	166	1	167	8	
Alessandro	Australia	U	2006–2007	11	10	21	0	
James Robinson	England	U	2006–2007	1	6	7	1	
Antun Kovacic	Australia	DF	2007	0	2	2	0	
Joe Keenan	England	U	2007	15	2	17	1	
Matthew Kemp	Australia	U	2007–2012	88	8	96	2	
Ljubo Milicevic	Australia	U	2007	6	0	6	0	
Kaz Patafta	Australia	U	2007–2008	5	17	22	1	
Carlos Hernández	Costa Rica	U	2007–2012	125	16	141	39	
Daniel Vasilevski	Australia	U	2007–2008	9	7	16	0	
Leandro Love	Brazil	FW	2007–2008	7	10	17	0	
Sebastian Ryall	Australia	DF	2007–2009	26	8	34	0	
Evan Berger	Australia	U	2007–2011	31	24	55	0	
Steven Pace	Australia	DF	2007–2008	6	7	13	0	
Nick Ward	Australia	MF	2007–2010	46	16	62	5	
Mitchell Langerak	Australia	GK	2008–2010	26	3	29	0	
Billy Celeski	Australia	MF	2008–2013	85	16	101	2	
Tom Pondeljak	Australia	MF	2008–2011	70	20	90	10	
Nathan Elasi	Australia	FW	2008–2010	1	9	10	0	
Ney Fabiano	Australia	FW	2008–2009	20	14	34	7	
Michael Thwaite	Australia	U	2008–2009	19	1	20	1	
José Luis López	Costa Rica	MF	2008–2009	13	8	21	0	
Glen Moss	New Zealand	GK	2009–2010	15	0	15	0	
Surat Sukha	Thailand	U	2009–2011	39	7	46	0	
Matthew Foschini	Australia	U	2009–2013	34	19	53	0	
Robbie Kruse	Australia	U	2009–2011; 2019–	53	7	60	19	
Mate Dugandzic	Australia	U	2009–2011	19	21	40	8	
Sutee Suksomkit	Thailand	U	2009	4	5	9	0	
Luke Pilkington	Australia	U	2009–2011	0	5	5	0	
Marvin Angulo	Costa Rica	U	2010–2011	26	20	46	0	
Aziz Behich	Australia	U	2010	0	5	5	0	
Nik Mrdja	Australia	FW	2010	6	2	8	1	
Diogo Ferreira	Australia	U	2010–2013	39	21	60	3	
Michael Petkovic	Australia	GK	2010–2011	33	0	33	0	
Geoff Kellaway	England	MF	2010	1	8	9	0	
Ricardinho	Brazil	U	2010–2011	11	7	18	2	
Petar Franjic	Australia	DF	2011–2012	26	4	30	0	
Isaka Cernak	Australia	MF	2011–2012	12	13	25	2	
Tando Velaphi	Australia	GK	2011–2012	7	0	7	0	
Ante Covic	Australia	GK	2011–2012	24	0	24	0	
Fabinho	Brazil	DF	2011–2012	23	0	23	1	
Harry Kewell	Australia	U	2011–2012	25	0	25	8	
Marco Rojas	New Zealand	FW	2011–2013; 2016–2017; 2020–	76	13	89	34	
Jean Carlos Solórzano	Costa Rica	FW	2011–2012	4	9	13	0	
Lawrence Thomas	Australia	GK	2011–	149	2	151	0	
James Jeggo	Australia	MF	2011–2014	19	15	34	3	
Mark Milligan	Australia	U	2012–2015; 2017–2018	93	4	97	20	
Ubay Luzardo	Spain	DF	2012	7	0	7	0	
Julius Davies	Australia	U	2012	0	2	2	0	
Jonathan Bru	Mauritius	MF	2012–2013	8	11	19	0	
Guilherme Finkler	Brazil	MF	2012–2016	82	17	99	23	
Marcos Flores	Argentina	U	2012–2013	23	1	24	4	
Adama Traoré	Ivory Coast	U	2012–2014; 2019–	79	0	79	1	
Theo Markelis	Australia	U	2012	0	5	5	0	
Andrew Nabbout	Australia	U	2012–2015; 2019–2020	39	34	73	16	
Nathan Coe	Australia	GK	2012–2015	80	0	80	0	
Christopher Cristaldo	Australia	MF	2012–2014	0	4	4	1	
Sam Gallagher	Australia	DF	2012	2	0	2	0	
Nick Ansell	Australia	DF	2012–2018	78	16	94	3	
Luke O'Dea	Australia	MF	2013	0	2	2	0	
Francesco Stella	Australia	MF	2013	2	6	8	0	
Scott Galloway	Australia	U	2013–2016	51	14	65	1	
Connor Pain	Australia	U	2013–2016	23	44	67	5	
Jesse Makarounas	Australia	FW	2013–2016	15	39	54	3	
Daniel Mullen	Australia	DF	2013	9	0	9	0	
Dylan Murnane	Australia	DF	2013–2016	26	6	32	0	
Jason Geria	Australia	DF	2013–2018	121	13	134	1	
Pablo Contreras	Chile	DF	2013–2014	24	0	24	1	
Rashid Mahazi	Australia	MF	2013–2017	45	46	91	0	
Mitch Nichols	Australia	U	2013–2014	14	0	14	3	
James Troisi	Australia	MF	2013–2014; 2016–2019	118	8	126	32	
Kosta Barbarouses	New Zealand	U	2013–2016; 2017–2019	150	11	161	51	
Jordan Brown	Australia	MF	2014	0	6	6	0	
Tom Rogic	Australia	U	2014	9	2	11	0	
Besart Berisha	Kosovo	FW	2014–2018	137	0	137	86	
Matthieu Delpierre	France	DF	2014–2016	55	1	56	2	
Carl Valeri	Australia	MF	2014–2019	127	9	136	2	
Daniel Georgievski	Macedonia	DF	2014–2017	67	16	83	4	
Fahid Ben Khalfallah	Tunisia	U	2014–2017	77	9	86	14	
Kieran Dover	Australia	DF	2014–2015	0	2	2	0	
George Howard	Australia	FW	2015–2017	3	16	19	3	
Thomas Deng	Australia	DF	2015–2019	78	9	87	2	
Danny Vukovic	Australia	GK	2015–2016	30	0	30	0	
Joey Katebian	Australia	FW	2015	0	2	2	0	
Oliver Bozanic	Australia	MF	2015–2017	56	7	63	7	
Giancarlo Gallifuoco	Australia	U	2015–2016; 2020–	9	3	12	0	
Jai Ingham	New Zealand	MF	2016–2019	23	44	67	4	
Stefan Nigro	Australia	MF	2016–2018	21	10	31	0	
Mitch Austin	Australia	U	2016–2017	17	12	29	5	
Alan Baró	Spain	U	2016–2017	30	0	30	0	
Sebastian Pasquali	Australia	MF	2016	0	4	4	0	
James Donachie	Australia	DF	2016–2018; 2019–2020	81	10	91	1	
Maximilian Beister	Germany	FW	2016–2017	1	8	9	1	
Matt Acton	Australia	GK	2016–	18	2	20	0	
Cameron McGilp	Australia	DF	2017–2018	0	3	3	0	
Christian Theoharous	Australia	FW	2017–2018	3	22	25	1	
Rhys Williams	Australia	DF	2017–2018	32	0	32	2	
Josh Hope	Australia	MF	2017–	13	27	40	2	
Leroy George	Netherlands	U	2017–2018	32	2	34	12	
Matías Sánchez	Argentina	MF	2017–2018	14	11	25	0	
Kenny Athiu	South Sudan	FW	2017–	18	33	51	4	
Dino Djulbic	Australia	DF	2018	3	0	3	0	
Terry Antonis	Australia	MF	2018–2019	48	5	53	5	
Pierce Waring	Australia	FW	2018	1	1	2	1	
Birkan Kirdar	Australia	MF	2018–	6	2	8	0	
Corey Brown	Australia	DF	2018–2019	31	6	37	1	
Storm Roux	New Zealand	DF	2018–	50	9	59	3	
Raúl Baena	Spain	MF	2018–2019	18	6	24	1	
Keisuke Honda	Japan	MF	2018–2019	22	2	24	8	
Georg Niedermeier	Germany	DF	2018–2019	16	3	19	2	
Ola Toivonen	Sweden	FW	2018–	43	6	49	29	
Rahmat Akbari	Australia	MF	2018–2019	2	9	11	0	
Elvis Kamsoba	Burundi	MF	2019–	16	33	49	2	
Anthony Lesiotis	AustraliaF	MF	2019–	15	16	31	0	
Jack Palazzolo	Australia	FW	2019–	1	2	3	0	
Benjamin Carrigan	Australia	DF	2019–	9	4	13	0	
Aaron Anderson	Australia	DF	2019–	4	1	5	0	
Brandon Lauton	Australia	DF	2019–	7	9	16	0	
Jakob Poulsen	Denmark	MF	2019–2020	12	5	17	0	
Kristijan Dobras	Austria	MF	2019–2020	7	2	9	2	
Migjen Basha	Albania	MF	2019–	24	5	29	2	
Tim Hoogland	Germany	MF	2019–	5	1	6	0	
Jay Barnett	Australia	MF	2019–	6	6	12	0	
So Nishikawa	Australia	DF	2020–	0	4	4	0	
Luis Lawrie-Lattanzio	Australia	MF	2020–	4	1	5	0	
Lleyton Brooks	Australia	FW	2020–	0	2	2	0	
Joshua Varga	Australia	MF	2020–	0	1	1	0	

== International representatives ==
Players that represented their national team while contracted to Melbourne Victory.

Name	National team	Notes
Adrian Leijer	Australia	
Archie Thompson	Australia	
Billy Celeski	Australia	
Carlos Hernandez	Costa Rica	
Connor Pain	Australia	Made his Socceroos debut whilst playing for Melbourne
Daniel Allsopp	Australia	
Daniel Arzani	Australia	
Elvis Kamsoba	Burundi	
Harry Kewell	Australia	
Jason Geria	Australia	
José Luis López	Costa Rica	
Kevin Muscat	Australia	
Leigh Broxham	Australia	
Marco Rojas	New Zealand	
Mark Milligan	Australia	
Marvin Angulo	Costa Rica	
Matthew Kemp	Australia	
Mitch Nichols	Australia	
Nishan Velupillay	Australia	Made his Socceroos debut whilst playing for Melbourne
Robbie Kruse	Australia	
Rodrigo Vargas	Australia	
Robbie Kruse	Australia	
Ryan Teague	Australia	Made his Socceroos debut whilst playing for Melbourne
Surat Sukha	Thailand	
Sutee Suksomkit	Thailand	
Tom Pondeljak	Australia	
