= 2019–20 Melbourne Victory FC season =

Melbourne Victory
2019–20 season
- Chairman: Anthony Di Pietro
- Manager: Marco Kurz (to 15 January 2020); Carlos Pérez Salvachúa (caretaker) (from 15 January 2020 to 30 May 2020); Grant Brebner (caretaker) (from 11 June 2020)
- Stadium: AAMI Park; Marvel Stadium
- A-League: 10th
- FFA Cup: Round of 32
- AFC Champions League: Round of 16
- Top goalscorer: League: Ola Toivonen (10 goals); All: Ola Toivonen (12 goals)
- Highest home attendance: 33,523 vs Melbourne City (12 October 2019)
- Lowest home attendance: 12,023 vs Wellington Phoenix (14 December 2019)
- Average home league attendance: 17,366
Home colours	Away colours

The 2019–20 season was the Melbourne Victory's 15th season in the A-League. The club participated in the A-League, the FFA Cup, and the AFC Champions League.

On 24 March 2020, the FFA announced that the 2019–20 A-League season would be postponed until further notice due to the COVID-19 pandemic in Australia and New Zealand, and subsequently extended indefinitely. The season resumed on 17 July 2020. Similarly, the 2020 AFC Champions League competition has been suspended until at least mid-September 2020 in West Zone. The AFC Executive Committee agreed to played AFC Champions League East Zone matches which are now scheduled to be played between 15 November and 13 December 2020 in Qatar.

== Players ==
Note: Flags indicate national team as defined under FIFA eligibility rules; some limited exceptions apply. Players may hold more than one non-FIFA nationality.

No.	Pos.	Nation	Player
1	GK	AUS	Matt Acton
2	DF	NZL	Storm Roux
4	DF	AUS	James Donachie
6	MF	AUS	Leigh Broxham (Vice-captain)
7	FW	SSD	Kenny Athiu
9	FW	AUS	Andrew Nabbout
10	FW	AUS	Robbie Kruse
13	MF	AUS	Birkan Kirdar (Scholarship)
15	DF	AUS	Giancarlo Gallifuoco
16	MF	AUS	Josh Hope

No.	Pos.	Nation	Player
17	MF	BDI	Elvis Kamsoba
18	MF	ALB	Migjen Basha
19	DF	AUS	Benjamin Carrigan
21	DF	CIV	Adama Traoré
23	MF	NZL	Marco Rojas
24	MF	AUS	Anthony Lesiotis
25	MF	AUS	Brandon Lauton (Scholarship)
26	MF	AUS	Jay Barnett (Scholarship)
30	GK	AUS	Matthew Sutton (Scholarship)

== Transfers ==
=== Transfers in ===
No.	Position	Player	Transferred from	Type/fee	Contract length	Date	Ref
26	MF	Jay Barnett	Brisbane Roar	Scholarship	1 year	4 June 2019	
10	FW	Robbie Kruse	Unattached	Free transfer	2 years	23 July 2019	
9	FW	Andrew Nabbout	(Japan) Urawa Red Diamonds	Undisclosed	1 year	25 July 2019	
5	DF	(Germany) Tim Hoogland	(Germany) VfL Bochum	Free transfer	1 year	16 August 2019	
22	MF	(Austria) Kristijan Dobras	Unattached	Free transfer	1 year	20 August 2019	
8	MF	(Denmark) Jakob Poulsen	(Denmark) Midtjylland	Undisclosed	1 year	2 September 2019	
21	DF	(Ivory Coast) Adama Traoré	Unattached	Undisclosed	1 year	12 September 2019	
18	MF	(Albania) Migjen Basha	(Greece) Aris Thessaloniki	Free transfer	2 years	19 September 2019	
50	GK	Brendan White	(Australia) Heidelberg United	Injury replacement		31 October 2019	
23	MF	(New Zealand) Marco Rojas	Unattached	Free transfer	2.5 years	22 January 2020	
15	DF	Giancarlo Gallifuoco	Unattached	Free transfer	0.5 years	3 February 2020	

==== From youth squad ====
N	Pos.	Nat.	Name	Age	Notes
19	DF	(Australia)	Benjamin Carrigan	21	1 year contract
25	MF	(Australia)	Brandon Lauton	19	2 year scholarship contract

=== Transfers out ===
No.	Position	Player	Transferred to	Type/fee	Date	Ref
21	MF	Carl Valeri	Retired		12 April 2019	
4	MF	(Japan) Keisuke Honda	Unattached	End of contract	3 May 2019	
15	MF	(Spain) Raúl Baena	(Spain) Granada	Loan return	28 May 2019	
5	DF	(Germany) Georg Niedermeier	Unattached	End of contract	28 May 2019	
23	FW	(New Zealand) Jai Ingham	Unattached	End of contract	28 May 2019	
19	MF	Rahmat Akbari	Brisbane Roar	Loan return	4 June 2019	
9	FW	(New Zealand) Kosta Barbarouses	Sydney FC	Free transfer	6 June 2019	
8	MF	Terry Antonis	(South Korea) Suwon Samsung Bluewings	Undisclosed	23 July 2019	
10	FW	James Troisi	Unattached	End of contract	6 August 2019	
3	DF	Corey Brown	Brisbane Roar	Free transfer	17 January 2020	
22	MF	(Austria) Kristijan Dobras	Unattached	Mutual contract termination	22 January 2020	
14	DF	Thomas Deng	(Japan) Urawa Red Diamonds	Undisclosed	28 January 2020	
50	GK	Brendan White	Unattached	End of contract	20 February 2020	
8	MF	(Denmark) Jakob Poulsen	Retired		6 May 2020	
11	FW	(Sweden) Ola Toivonen	Unattached	End of contract	4 June 2020	
5	DF	(Germany) Tim Hoogland	Unattached	End of contract	15 July 2020	
20	GK	Lawrence Thomas	(Denmark) SønderjyskE	End of contract	26 July 2020	

=== Contract extensions ===
No.	Name	Position	Duration	Date	Notes
6	Leigh Broxham	Midfielder	2 years	29 May 2019	
16	Joshua Hope	Attacking midfielder	1 year	29 May 2019	
4	James Donachie	Centre-back	1 year	16 August 2019	(Note: Donachie formally returned to his parent club Jeonnam Dragons at the end of his loan contract and then transferred permanently to Melbourne Victory, signing a one-year contract.)

== Technical staff ==
Position	Name
Head coach	(Scotland) Grant Brebner (caretaker)
Assistant coach	(Wales) Jeff Hopkins (caretaker)
Goalkeeping Coach	Vacant

== Pre-season and friendlies ==
14 August 2019	Dandenong City (Australia)	0–4	(Australia) Melbourne Victory	Melbourne, Australia
19:30 AEST		Report	Kamsoba 54', 82'; Toivonen 68'; Kirdar 81'	Stadium: Frank Holohan Reserve

20 August 2019	Oakleigh Cannons (Australia)	0–3	(Australia) Melbourne Victory	Melbourne, Australia
19:30 AEST		Report	Kamsoba 31', 89'; Athiu 51'	Stadium: Jack Edwards Reserve

28 August 2019	Port Melbourne (Australia)	1–5	(Australia) Melbourne Victory	Melbourne, Australia
19:30 AEST	Lauton 64' (o.g.)	Report	Athiu 12', 47'; Nabbout 14', 22'; Toivonen 52'	Stadium: SS Anderson Reserve

6 September 2019	Dandenong Thunder (Australia)	1–6	(Australia) Melbourne Victory	Melbourne, Australia
19:30 AEST	43'	Report	Toivonen 25' (pen.), 79'; Hoogland 31'; Kamsoba 70'; Nabbout 73'; Dobras 89'	Stadium: George Andrews Reserve

15 September 2019	Western United (Australia)	0–6	(Australia) Melbourne Victory	Melbourne, Australia
13:00 AEST		Report	Toivonen (?); Nabbout (?); Athiu (?); Kamsoba (?); Kirdar (?)	Stadium: City Vista Pavilion and Sports Field; Attendance: 0 (behind closed doors)

21 September 2019	Melbourne Victory (Australia)	2–0	(Australia) Perth Glory	Morwell, Australia
14:00 AEST	Toivonen 40'; Kamsoba 85'	Report		Stadium: Latrobe City Stadium

29 September 2019	Melbourne Victory (Australia)	1–1	(New Zealand) Wellington Phoenix	Melbourne, Australia
15:00 AEST	Goal	Report	Piscopo	Attendance: 0 (behind closed doors)

11 January 2020	Oakleigh Cannons (Australia)	4–1	(Australia) Melbourne Victory	Melbourne, Australia
10:30 AEST		Report		Stadium: Jack Edwards Reserve

== Competitions ==
Win Draw Loss

=== Overview ===
Competition	First match	Last match	Starting round	Final position	Record							
Competition	First match	Last match	Starting round	Final position	Pld	W	D	L	GF	GA	GD	Win %
A-League	12 October 2019	12 August 2020	Matchday 1	10th	26	6	5	15	33	44	−11	23.08
FFA Cup	7 August 2019		Round of 32	Round of 32	1	0	0	1	2	3	−1	0.00
AFC Champions League	21 January 2020	18 February 2020	Preliminary stage	Group stage	4	3	0	1	7	1	+6	75.00
Total					31	9	5	17	42	48	−6	29.03

Source: Soccerway

=== A-League ===
==== League table ====
Pos	Team	Pld	W	D	L	GF	GA	GD	Pts	Qualification
1	Sydney FC (C)	26	16	5	5	49	25	+24	53	Qualification for 2021 AFC Champions League group stage and Finals series (Note: All Australian teams withdrew from the 2021 AFC Champions League on 4 June 2021.) (Note: The top two teams enter the Finals series at the semi-finals, while the teams ranked third to sixth enter the Finals series at the elimination-finals.)
2	Melbourne City	26	14	5	7	49	37	+12	47	Qualification for 2021 AFC Champions League qualifying play-offs and Finals series
3	Wellington Phoenix (Note: Wellington Phoenix cannot qualify for the 2021 AFC Champions League as they are not recognised as an AFC club.)	26	12	5	9	38	33	+5	41	Qualification for Finals series
4	Brisbane Roar	26	11	7	8	29	28	+1	40	Qualification for 2021 AFC Champions League qualifying play-offs and Finals series
5	Western United	26	12	3	11	46	37	+9	39	Qualification for Finals series
6	Perth Glory	26	10	7	9	43	36	+7	37	Qualification for Finals series
7	Adelaide United	26	11	3	12	44	49	−5	36	
8	Newcastle Jets	26	9	7	10	32	40	−8	34	
9	Western Sydney Wanderers	26	9	6	11	35	40	−5	33	
10	Melbourne Victory	26	6	5	15	33	44	−11	23	
11	Central Coast Mariners	26	5	3	18	26	55	−29	18	

Source: A-Leagues
Rules for classification: 1) points; 2) goal difference; 3) number of goals scored.
(C) Champions

==== Results summary ====
Overall								Home						Away					
Pld	W	D	L	GF	GA	GD	Pts	W	D	L	GF	GA	GD	W	D	L	GF	GA	GD
26	6	5	15	33	44	−11	23	3	3	7	16	21	−5	3	2	8	17	23	−6

Last updated: 14 December 2019.
Source: ultimatealeague.com

==== Results by round ====
Round	1	2	3	4	5	6	7	8	9	10	11	12	13	14	15	16	17	18	19	20	21	22	23	28	24	26	25	27
Ground	H	H	A	H	H	A	A	H	A	H	A	B	H	A	A	H	A	A	B	A	H	H	A	N	N	N	N	N
Result	D	L	W	L	D	L	L	W	L	D	W	X	W	L	L	L	D	L	X	D	W	L	L	L	L	L	W	L
Position	6	9	6	7	7	8	10	8	10	8	7	8	7	6	8	8	9	9	9	9	9	9	10	10	10	10	10	10
Points	1	1	4	4	5	5	5	8	8	9	12	12	15	15	15	15	16	16	16	17	20	20	20	20	20	20	23	23

Source: worldfootball.net
A = Away; H = Home; N = Neutral; B = Bye; W = Win; D = Draw; L = Loss; X = Bye

==== Matches ====
12 October 2019 1	Melbourne Victory	0–0	Melbourne City	Melbourne
19:30 AEDT		Report		Stadium: Marvel Stadium; Attendance: 33,523; Referee: Chris Beath

18 October 2019 2	Melbourne Victory	1–2	Western Sydney Wanderers	Melbourne
19:30 AEDT	Toivonen 72' (pen.)	Report	Baccus 54'; Meier 62'	Stadium: Marvel Stadium; Attendance: 17,231; Referee: Alex King

25 October 2019 3	Brisbane Roar	0–1	Melbourne Victory	Brisbane
18:30 AEST		Report	Nabbout 19'	Stadium: Suncorp Stadium; Attendance: 12,859; Referee: Kurt Ams

2 November 2019 4	Melbourne Victory	2–3	Western United	Melbourne
19:30 AEDT	Toivonen 6'; Dobras 7'	Report	Diamanti 16'; Donachie 29' (o.g.); McDonald 51'	Stadium: Marvel Stadium; Attendance: 20,865; Referee: Alireza Faghani

10 November 2019 5	Melbourne Victory	1–1	Wellington Phoenix	Melbourne
16:00 AEDT	Toivonen 66'	Report	Dávila 5' (pen.)	Stadium: AAMI Park; Attendance: 15,014; Referee: Adam Kersey

17 November 2019 6	Sydney FC	2–1	Melbourne Victory	Sydney
18:30 AEDT	Le Fondre 61'; Barbarouses 68'	Report	Toivonen 45'	Stadium: Jubilee Stadium; Attendance: 16,115; Referee: Shaun Evans

23 November 2019 7	Adelaide United	3–1	Melbourne Victory	Adelaide
19:00 ACDT	McGree 23', 68'; Maria 63'	Report	Toivonen 61'	Stadium: Coopers Stadium; Attendance: 12,198; Referee: Alireza Faghani

29 November 2019 8	Melbourne Victory	1–0	Perth Glory	Melbourne
19:30 AEDT	Kruse 33'	Report		Stadium: AAMI Park; Attendance: 13,084; Referee: Alex King

8 December 2019 9	Western United	3–1	Melbourne Victory	Geelong
16:00 AEDT	Berisha 17'; Kone 24'; Berisha 43'	Report	Nabbout 14'	Stadium: GMHBA Stadium; Attendance: 10,128; Referee: Adam Kersey

14 December 2019 10	Melbourne Victory	0–0	Wellington Phoenix	Melbourne
17:00 AEDT		Report		Stadium: AAMI Park; Attendance: 12,023; Referee: Stephen Lucas

21 December 2019 11	Melbourne City	1–2	Melbourne Victory	Melbourne
17:00 AEDT	Delbridge 56'	Report	Toivonen 15', 41'	Stadium: AAMI Park; Attendance: 17,083; Referee: Alex King

5 January 2020 13	Melbourne Victory	4–0	Newcastle Jets	Melbourne
18:30 AEDT	Kruse 9'; Basha 61'; Nabbout 64'; Millar 86' (o.g.)	Report		Stadium: AAMI Park; Attendance: 14,582; Referee: Daniel Elder

12 January 2020 14	Central Coast Mariners	3–2	Melbourne Victory	Gosford
18:00 AEDT	Murray 44'; Simon 90+4' (pen.), 90+10' (pen.)	Report	Dobras 8'; Rowles 78' (o.g.)	Stadium: Central Coast Stadium; Attendance: 4,957; Referee: Kurt Ams

17 January 2020 15	Adelaide United	1–0	Melbourne Victory	Adelaide
19:00 ACDT	Halloran 32'	Report		Stadium: Coopers Stadium; Attendance: 11,412; Referee: Adam Kersey

24 January 2020 16	Melbourne Victory	0–3	Sydney FC	Melbourne
19:30 AEDT		Report	Le Fondre 27'; Barbarouses 53'; Baumjohann 85'	Stadium: AAMI Park; Attendance: 17,814; Referee: Alex King

1 February 2020 17	Perth Glory	2–2	Melbourne Victory	Perth
18:45 AWST	Fornaroli 45+2'; D'Agostino 90'	Report	Toivonen 23'; Nabbout 58'	Stadium: HBF Park; Attendance: 9,435; Referee: Stephen Lucas

7 February 2020 18	Melbourne City	2–1	Melbourne Victory	Melbourne
19:30 AEDT	Berenguer 8'; Maclaren 71'	Report	Toivonen 78'	Stadium: AAMI Park; Attendance: 16,872; Referee: Shaun Evans

22 February 2020 20	Newcastle Jets	1–1	Melbourne Victory	Newcastle
17:00 AEDT	O'Donovan 24'	Report	Toivonen 49'	Stadium: McDonald Jones Stadium; Attendance: 7,115; Referee: Alireza Faghani

29 February 2020 21	Melbourne Victory	2–1	Adelaide United	Melbourne
19:30 AEDT	Rojas 57'; Nabbout 90+1'	Report	Opseth 7'	Stadium: Marvel Stadium; Attendance: 14,424; Referee: Chris Beath

7 March 2020 22	Melbourne Victory	1–4	Sydney FC	Melbourne
19:30 AEDT	Rojas 5'	Report	Ninković 43'; Caceres 64'; Le Fondre 66'; Barbarouses 87' (pen.)	Stadium: Marvel Stadium; Attendance: 15,102; Referee: Shaun Evans

15 March 2020 23	Wellington Phoenix	3–0	Melbourne Victory	Wellington
18:00 NZDT	Dávila 3'; Hooper 21'; Ball 55'	Report		Stadium: Westpac Stadium; Attendance: 7,519; Referee: Alex King

25 July 2020 28	Melbourne Victory	1–2	Western United	Sydney
19:35 AEDT	Roux 83'	Report	Uskok 38'; Burgess 57'	Stadium: Bankwest Stadium; Attendance: 0 Referee: Alireza Faghani

29 July 2020 24	Melbourne Victory	1–2	Brisbane Roar	Sydney
19:30 AEDT	Nabbout 86' (pen.)	Report	McDonald 56'; Ridenton 78'	Stadium: Bankwest Stadium; Attendance: 0 Referee: Alex King

3 August 2020 26	Melbourne Victory	2–3	Central Coast Mariners	Sydney
19:30 AEDT	Rojas 22', 65'	Report	Fox 48'; Ruiz-Diaz 85', 89'	Stadium: Netstrata Jubilee Oval; Attendance: 0 Referee: Tim Danaskos

8 August 2020 25	Perth Glory	0–4	Melbourne Victory	Sydney
17:00 AEDT		Report	Rojas 29', 69'; Nabbout 60' (pen.); Kamsoba 90'	Stadium: Netstrata Jubilee Oval; Attendance: 0 Referee: Chris Beath

12 August 2020 27	Western Sydney Wanderers	2–1	Melbourne Victory	Sydney
20:10 AEDT	Schwegler 34'; O'Doherty 62'	Report	Nabbout 66'	Stadium: Bankwest Stadium; Attendance: 1,118; Referee: Ben Abraham

=== FFA Cup ===
7 August Round of 32	Melbourne Victory (Victoria (state))	2–3 (a.e.t.)	(New South Wales) Newcastle Jets	Melbourne
19:30	Nabbout 45+1', 61'	Report	Koutroumbis 74'; D. Petratos 81'; Langlois 113'	Stadium: AAMI Park; Attendance: 4,045; Referee: Shaun Evans

=== AFC Champions League ===
==== Qualifying play-offs ====
21 January 2020 Prelim. round 2	Melbourne Victory (Australia)	5–0	(Indonesia) Bali United	Melbourne, Australia
19:35 UTC+11	Basha 14'; Hope 37'; Kruse 59'; Toivonen 81'; Kamsoba 90'	Report		Stadium: AAMI Park; Attendance: 5,387; Referee: Mohammed Al-Hoish (Saudi Arabia)

28 January 2020 Play-off round	Kashima Antlers (Japan)	0–1	(Australia) Melbourne Victory	Kashima, Japan
19:00 UTC+9		Report	Nabbout 54'	Stadium: Kashima Soccer Stadium; Attendance: 4,275; Referee: Mooud Bonyadifar (Iran)

==== Group stage ====
Pos	Team	Pld	W	D	L	GF	GA	GD	Pts	Qualification
1	(China) Beijing Guoan	6	5	1	0	12	4	+8	16	Advance to knockout stage
2	(Australia) Melbourne Victory	6	2	1	3	6	9	−3	7	Advance to knockout stage
3	(South Korea) FC Seoul	6	2	0	4	10	9	+1	6	
4	(Thailand) Chiangrai United	6	1	2	3	5	11	−6	5	

Source: AFC
Rules for classification: Tiebreakers

11 February 2020	Melbourne Victory (Australia)	1–0	(Thailand) Chiangrai United	Melbourne, Australia
19:35 UTC+11	Toivonen 25' (pen.)	Report		Stadium: AAMI Park; Attendance: 4,156; Referee: Turki Al-Khudhayr (Saudi Arabia)

18 February 2020	FC Seoul (South Korea)	1–0	(Australia) Melbourne Victory	Seoul, South Korea
19:30 UTC+9	C.Y. Park 8'	Report		Stadium: Seoul World Cup Stadium; Attendance: 6,035; Referee: Abdulrahman Al-Jassim (Qatar)

Melbourne Victory continued their 2020 AFC Champions League campaign in their 2020–21 season.

== Statistics ==
=== Appearances and goals ===
Includes all competitions. Players with no appearances not included in the list.

No.	Pos	Nat	Player	Total		A-League		FFA Cup		AFC Champions League	
No.	Pos	Nat	Player	Apps	Goals	Apps	Goals	Apps	Goals	Apps	Goals
1	GK	(Australia) AUS	Matt Acton	6	0	5	0	0+1	0	0	0
2	DF	(New Zealand) NZL	Storm Roux	24	1	18+3	1	0	0	3	0
3	DF	(Australia) AUS	Corey Brown	7	0	3+3	0	1	0	0	0
4	DF	(Australia) AUS	James Donachie	29	0	25	0	0	0	4	0
5	DF	(Germany) GER	Tim Hoogland	6	0	5+1	0	0	0	0	0
6	MF	(Australia) AUS	Leigh Broxham	26	0	23	0	1	0	2	0
7	FW	(South Sudan) SSD	Kenny Athiu	17	0	1+13	0	1	0	1+1	0
8	MF	(Denmark) DEN	Jakob Poulsen	17	0	11+5	0	0	0	1	0
9	FW	(Australia) AUS	Andrew Nabbout	27	11	22	8	1	2	4	1
10	FW	(Australia) AUS	Robbie Kruse	13	3	8+3	2	0	0	2	1
11	FW	(Sweden) SWE	Ola Toivonen	23	12	17+1	10	0+1	0	2+2	2
13	MF	(Australia) AUS	Birkan Kirdar	6	0	6	0	0	0	0	0
14	DF	(Australia) AUS	Thomas Deng	7	0	6	0	1	0	0	0
15	DF	(Australia) AUS	Giancarlo Gallifuoco	6	0	4	0	0	0	2	0
16	MF	(Australia) AUS	Josh Hope	11	1	1+8	0	1	0	1	1
17	FW	(Burundi) BDI	Elvis Kamsoba	29	2	21+4	1	1	0	3	1
18	MF	(Albania) ALB	Migjen Basha	29	2	20+5	1	0	0	4	1
19	DF	(Australia) AUS	Benjamin Carrigan	10	0	4+2	0	1	0	1+2	0
20	GK	(Australia) AUS	Lawrence Thomas	26	0	21	0	1	0	4	0
21	FW	(Ivory Coast) CIV	Adama Traoré	27	0	23	0	0	0	4	0
22	MF	(Austria) AUT	Kristijan Dobras	9	2	7+2	2	0	0	0	0
23	FW	(New Zealand) NZL	Marco Rojas	12	6	8+2	6	0	0	0+2	0
24	MF	(Australia) AUS	Anthony Lesiotis	22	0	10+7	0	1	0	2+2	0
25	DF	(Australia) AUS	Brandon Lauton	16	0	4+8	0	1	0	2+1	0
26	MF	(Australia) AUS	Jay Barnett	12	0	5+4	0	0	0	1+2	0
32	FW	(Australia) AUS	Jack Palazzolo	1	0	0	0	0+1	0	0	0
33	DF	(Australia) AUS	Aaron Anderson	4	0	4	0	0	0	0	0
38	DF	(Japan) JPN	So Nishikawa	4	0	0+4	0	0	0	0	0
39	FW	(Australia) AUS	Lleyton Brooks	2	0	0+2	0	0	0	0	0
43	FW	(Australia) AUS	Luis Lawrie-Lattanzio	5	0	4+1	0	0	0	0	0
46	MF	(Australia) AUS	Joshua Varga	1	0	0+1	0	0	0	0	0

=== Disciplinary record ===
Includes all competitions. The list is sorted by squad number when total cards are equal. Players with no cards not included in the list.

No.	Pos	Nat	Player	Total			A-League			FFA Cup			AFC Champions League		
No.	Pos	Nat	Player	Yellow card	Second yellow card	Red card	Yellow card	Second yellow card	Red card	Yellow card	Second yellow card	Red card	Yellow card	Second yellow card	Red card
22	MF	(Austria) AUT	Kristijan Dobras	1	0	1	1	0	1	0	0	0	0	0	0
5	DF	(Germany) GER	Tim Hoogland	0	0	1	0	0	1	0	0	0	0	0	0
6	MF	(Australia) AUS	Leigh Broxham	6	1	0	5	1	0	1	0	0	0	0	0
4	DF	(Australia) AUS	James Donachie	8	0	0	6	0	0	0	0	0	2	0	0
11	FW	(Sweden) SWE	Ola Toivonen	8	0	0	7	0	0	1	0	0	0	0	0
18	MF	(Albania) ALB	Migjen Basha	5	0	0	4	0	0	0	0	0	1	0	0
2	DF	(New Zealand) NZL	Storm Roux	4	0	0	3	0	0	0	0	0	1	0	0
9	FW	(Australia) AUS	Andrew Nabbout	4	0	0	4	0	0	0	0	0	0	0	0
7	FW	(South Sudan) SSD	Kenny Athiu	3	0	0	3	0	0	0	0	0	0	0	0
15	DF	(Australia) AUS	Giancarlo Gallifuoco	3	0	0	2	0	0	0	0	0	1	0	0
21	FW	(Ivory Coast) CIV	Adama Traoré	3	0	0	2	0	0	0	0	0	1	0	0
8	MF	(Denmark) DEN	Jakob Poulsen	2	0	0	2	0	0	0	0	0	0	0	0
10	FW	(Australia) AUS	Robbie Kruse	2	0	0	2	0	0	0	0	0	0	0	0
13	MF	(Australia) AUS	Birkan Kirdar	2	0	0	2	0	0	0	0	0	0	0	0
14	DF	(Australia) AUS	Thomas Deng	2	0	0	2	0	0	0	0	0	0	0	0
16	MF	(Australia) AUS	Josh Hope	2	0	0	1	0	0	0	0	0	1	0	0
23	FW	(New Zealand) NZL	Marco Rojas	2	0	0	2	0	0	0	0	0	0	0	0
24	MF	(Australia) AUS	Anthony Lesiotis	2	0	0	2	0	0	0	0	0	0	0	0
26	MF	(Australia) AUS	Jay Barnett	2	0	0	2	0	0	0	0	0	0	0	0
33	DF	(Australia) AUS	Aaron Anderson	2	0	0	2	0	0	0	0	0	0	0	0
17	FW	(Burundi) BDI	Elvis Kamsoba	1	0	0	1	0	0	0	0	0	0	0	0
20	GK	(Australia) AUS	Lawrence Thomas	1	0	0	1	0	0	0	0	0	0	0	0
25	DF	(Australia) AUS	Brandon Lauton	2	0	0	1	0	0	0	0	0	1	0	0
43	FW	(Australia) AUS	Luis Lawrie-Lattanzio	1	0	0	1	0	0	0	0	0	0	0	0

- (yellow card) = Number of bookings; (second yellow card) = Number of sending offs after a second yellow card; (red card) = Number of sending offs by a direct red card.

Rank	No.	Nat.	Goalkeeper	A-League	FFA Cup	AFC Champions League	Total
1	20	(Australia)	Lawrence Thomas	5	0	3	8
2	1	(Australia)	Matt Acton	1	0	0	1
Total				6	0	3	9
