= 2018–19 Melbourne Victory FC season =

Melbourne Victory
2018–19 season
- Chairman: Anthony Di Pietro
- Manager: Kevin Muscat
- Stadium: AAMI Park & Marvel Stadium, Melbourne
- A-League: 3rd
- A-League Finals Series: Semi-final
- FFA Cup: Round of 16
- AFC Champions League: Group stage
- Top goalscorer: League: Kosta Barbarouses; Ola Toivonen (15 each); All: Kosta Barbarouses (17)
- Highest home attendance: 40,504 vs. Melbourne City (20 October 2018)
- Lowest home attendance: 8,039 vs. Newcastle Jets (2 March 2019)
- Average home league attendance: 20,604
Home colours	Away colours

The 2018–19 Melbourne Victory FC season was the club's 14th season since its establishment in 2004. The club participated in the A-League for the 14th time and the AFC Champions League for the seventh time.

== Players ==
=== Squad information ===
Note: Flags indicate national team as defined under FIFA eligibility rules; some limited exceptions apply. Players may hold more than one non-FIFA nationality.

No.	Pos.	Nation	Player
1	GK	AUS	Matt Acton
2	DF	NZL	Storm Roux
3	DF	AUS	Corey Brown
4	MF	JPN	Keisuke Honda
5	DF	GER	Georg Niedermeier
6	MF	AUS	Leigh Broxham (vice-captain)
7	FW	AUS	Kenny Athiu
8	MF	AUS	Terry Antonis
9	FW	NZL	Kosta Barbarouses
10	FW	AUS	James Troisi
11	FW	SWE	Ola Toivonen
13	MF	AUS	Birkan Kirdar

No.	Pos.	Nation	Player
14	DF	AUS	Thomas Deng
15	MF	ESP	Raúl Baena (on loan from Granada)
16	MF	AUS	Josh Hope
17	DF	AUS	James Donachie
19	MF	AUS	Rahmat Akbari (on loan from Brisbane Roar)
20	GK	AUS	Lawrence Thomas
21	MF	AUS	Carl Valeri (Captain)
23	FW	NZL	Jai Ingham
24	MF	AUS	Elvis Kamsoba
25	MF	AUS	Anthony Lesiotis
30	GK	AUS	Matthew Sutton (Scholarship)

== Transfers ==
=== Transfers in ===
No.	Position	Player	Transferred from	Type/fee	Contract length	Date	Ref
3	DF	Corey Brown		Free transfer	2 years	22 June 2018	
2	DF	(New Zealand) Storm Roux		Free transfer	2 years	22 June 2018	
22	DF	Nick Ansell		Free transfer	2 years	18 July 2018	
5	DF	(Germany) Georg Niedermeier	(Germany) Freiburg	Free transfer	1 year	18 July 2018	
4	MF	(Japan) Keisuke Honda		Free transfer	1 year	6 August 2018	
11	FW	(Sweden) Ola Toivonen			2 years	30 August 2018	
15	MF	(Spain) Raúl Baena	(Spain) Granada	Loan	1 year	31 August 2018	
19	MF	Rahmat Akbari	Brisbane Roar	Loan	1 year	19 October 2018	
24	FW	Elvis Kamsoba	(Australia) Avondale	Free transfer	1.5 years	3 January 2019	
25	MF	Anthony Lesiotis	Melbourne City	Free transfer	1.5 years	3 January 2019	
17	DF	James Donachie	(South Korea) Jeonnam Dragons	Loan	4 months	1 February 2019	

=== Transfers out ===
No.	Position	Player	Transferred to	Type/fee	Date	Ref
11	FW	Mitch Austin		End of contract	15 May 2018	
15	MF	Cameron McGilp		End of contract	15 May 2018	
18	MF	(Argentina) Matías Sánchez		End of contract	15 May 2018	
22	MF	Stefan Nigro		Free transfer	15 May 2018	
31	FW	Christian Theoharous	(Germany) Borussia Mönchengladbach	Free transfer	19 May 2018	
17	DF	James Donachie	(South Korea) Jeonnam Dragons	Free transfer	19 June 2018	
19	FW	Pierce Waring		Free transfer	19 June 2018	
8	FW	(Kosovo) Besart Berisha	(Japan) Sanfrecce Hiroshima	Undisclosed Fee	29 June 2018	
4	DF	Rhys Williams	(Saudi Arabia) Al-Qadsiah	$456,000	12 July 2018	
41	FW	(Netherlands) Leroy George		Mutual contract termination	12 July 2018	
26	FW	Nicholas Sette		Mutual contract termination	23 January 2019	
22	DF	Nick Ansell	(South Korea) Jeonnam Dragons		24 January 2019	

=== From youth squad ===
N	Pos.	Nat.	Name	Age	Notes
13	MF	(Australia)	Birkan Kirdar	16	2 year contract
26	FW	(Australia)	Nicholas Sette	18	1 year contract

=== Contract extensions ===
No.	Name	Position	Duration	Date	Notes
20	Lawrence Thomas	Goalkeeper	2 years	30 May 2018	
6	Leigh Broxham	Midfielder	1 year	30 May 2018	
21	Carl Valeri	Defensive midfielder	1 year	30 May 2018	
16	Joshua Hope	Attacking midfielder	1 year	1 June 2018	
7	Kenny Athiu	Forward	2 years	18 June 2018	
14	Thomas Deng	Defender	1 year	26 October 2018	

== Technical staff ==
Position	Name
Manager	(Australia) Kevin Muscat
Assistant manager	(Spain) Carlos Pérez Salvachúa
Goalkeeping coach	(Australia) Jess Vanstrattan
Youth Team Manager	(Australia) Gareth Naven
Youth Team Assistant Manager	(New Zealand) Vaughan Coveny
Youth Team Developmental Manager	(Scotland) Grant Brebner
Youth goalkeeping coach	Vacant
Strength & Conditioning Coach	(Australia) Anthony Crea
Physiotherapist	(Australia) Justin Dougherty

== Squad statistics ==
=== Appearances and goals ===
N	Pos.	Nat.	Name	Total					A-League					A-League Finals Series					FFA Cup					AFC Champions League
N	Pos.	Nat.	Name	Apps	Goals	Yellow card	Second yellow card	Red card	Apps	Goals	Yellow card	Second yellow card	Red card	Apps	Goals	Yellow card	Second yellow card	Red card	Apps	Goals	Yellow card	Second yellow card	Red card	Apps	Goals	Yellow card	Second yellow card	Red card
1	GK	(Australia)	Matt Acton	9	0	0	0	0	5+0	0	0	0	0	0+0	0	0	0	0	2+0	0	0	0	0	2+0	0	0	0	0
2	DF	(New Zealand)	Storm Roux	34	2	3	0	0	21+4	2	2	0	0	0+1	0	0	0	0	2+0	0	0	0	0	6+0	0	1	0	0
3	DF	(Australia)	Corey Brown	30	1	5	0	0	21+2	1	4	0	0	0+0	0	0	0	0	2+0	0	0	0	0	4+1	0	1	0	0
4	MF	(Japan)	Keisuke Honda	23	8	4	0	0	16+2	7	4	0	0	1+0	0	0	0	0	0+0	0	0	0	0	4+0	1	0	0	0
5	DF	(Germany)	Georg Niedermeier	18	2	3	1	0	14+3	1	3	1	0	1+0	1	0	0	0	0+0	0	0	0	0	0+0	0	0	0	0
6	MF	(Australia)	Leigh Broxham	33	0	6	0	0	21+5	0	4	0	0	1+0	0	0	0	0	2+0	0	1	0	0	4+0	0	1	0	0
7	FW	(Australia)	Kenny Athiu	22	2	3	0	0	7+7	0	3	0	0	0+1	0	0	0	0	2+0	2	0	0	0	2+3	0	0	0	0
8	MF	(Australia)	Terry Antonis	30	4	6	0	0	23+1	4	6	0	0	1+0	0	0	0	0	2+0	0	0	0	0	3+0	0	0	0	0
9	FW	(New Zealand)	Kosta Barbarouses	34	16	5	0	0	26+1	14	3	0	0	1+0	1	0	0	0	2+0	1	0	0	0	4+0	0	2	0	0
10	FW	(Australia)	James Troisi	31	5	3	0	0	24+1	5	3	0	0	0+0	0	0	0	0	1+1	0	0	0	0	3+1	0	0	0	0
11	FW	(Sweden)	Ola Toivonen	25	16	4	0	0	18+2	13	3	0	0	1+0	1	0	0	0	0+0	0	0	0	0	4+0	2	1	0	0
13	MF	(Australia)	Birkan Kirdar	1	0	0	0	0	0+0	0	0	0	0	0+0	0	0	0	0	0+0	0	0	0	0	0+1	0	0	0	0
14	DF	(Australia)	Thomas Deng	34	0	4	0	0	23+3	0	3	0	0	1+0	0	0	0	0	2+0	0	1	0	0	5+0	0	0	0	0
15	MF	(Spain)	Raúl Baena	23	1	5	0	0	13+6	1	4	0	0	1+0	0	0	0	0	0+0	0	0	0	0	3+0	0	1	0	0
16	MF	(Australia)	Josh Hope	17	1	1	0	0	5+8	1	1	0	0	0+0	0	0	0	0	1+1	0	0	0	0	2+0	0	0	0	0
17	DF	(Australia)	James Donachie	14	0	4	1	0	6+2	0	2	1	0	1+0	0	0	0	0	0+0	0	0	0	0	5+0	0	2	0	0
19	MF	(Australia)	Rahmat Akbari	11	0	1	0	0	1+8	0	1	0	0	0+0	0	0	0	0	0+0	0	0	0	0	1+1	0	0	0	0
20	GK	(Australia)	Lawrence Thomas	27	0	2	0	0	22+0	0	2	0	0	1+0	0	0	0	0	0+0	0	0	0	0	4+0	0	0	0	0
21	MF	(Australia)	Carl Valeri	27	0	5	0	0	18+2	0	4	0	0	0+1	0	0	0	0	2+0	0	0	0	0	3+1	0	1	0	0
23	FW	(New Zealand)	Jai Ingham	8	1	1	0	0	1+3	0	0	0	0	0+0	0	0	0	0	2+0	0	1	0	0	2+0	1	0	0	0
24	MF	(Australia)	Elvis Kamsoba	19	0	1	0	0	6+8	0	1	0	0	1+0	0	0	0	0	0+0	0	0	0	0	1+3	0	0	0	0
25	MF	(Australia)	Anthony Lesiotis	9	0	2	0	0	1+5	0	0	0	0	0+0	0	0	0	0	0+0	0	1	0	0	1+2	0	1	0	0
27	DF	(Australia)	Aaron Anderson†	1	0	0	0	0	0+0	0	0	0	0	0+0	0	0	0	0	0+0	0	0	0	0	0+1	0	0	0	0
28	DF	(Australia)	Benjamin Carrigan†	2	0	0	0	0	0+0	0	0	0	0	0+0	0	0	0	0	0+0	0	0	0	0	2+0	0	0	0	0
29	MF	(Australia)	Thiel Iradukunda†	0	0	0	0	0	0+0	0	0	0	0	0+0	0	0	0	0	0+0	0	0	0	0	0+0	0	0	0	0
30	GK	(Australia)	Matthew Sutton†	0	0	0	0	0	0+0	0	0	0	0	0+0	0	0	0	0	0+0	0	0	0	0	0+0	0	0	0	0
31	MF	(Australia)	Brandon Lauton†	0	0	0	0	0	0+0	0	0	0	0	0+0	0	0	0	0	0+0	0	0	0	0	0+0	0	0	0	0
32	FW	(Australia)	Jack Palazzolo†	2	0	0	0	0	0+0	0	0	0	0	0+0	0	0	0	0	0+0	0	0	0	0	1+1	0	0	0	0
33	FW	(Australia)	Yazid Said†	0	0	0	0	0	0+0	0	0	0	0	0+0	0	0	0	0	0+0	0	0	0	0	0+0	0	0	0	0
Players no longer at the club
22	DF	(Australia)	Nick Ansell	1	0	0	0	0	0+0	0	0	0	0	0+0	0	0	0	0	0+1	0	0	0	0	0+0	0	0	0	0
26	FW	(Australia)	Nicholas Sette	0	0	0	0	0	0+0	0	0	0	0	0+0	0	0	0	0	0+0	0	0	0	0	0+0	0	0	0	0

- Last updated: 22 May 2019
- Source: au.soccerway.com
- (yellow card) = Number of bookings; (second yellow card) = Number of sending offs after a second yellow card; (red card) = Number of sending offs by a direct red card.

† = Scholarship or NPL/NYL-listed player

== Pre-season and friendlies ==
24 July 2018	Oakleigh Cannons (Australia)	2–4	(Australia) Melbourne Victory	Oakleigh
19:30 AEST	13' (pen.); 70'	Report	Athiu 7'; Barbarouses 16'; Brown 59'; Said 87'	Stadium: Jack Edwards Reserve

31 July 2018	Port Melbourne Sharks (Australia)	1–5	(Australia) Melbourne Victory	Port Melbourne
19:30 AEST	30'	Report	Antonis 14', 16', 18'; Athiu 27'; Hope 54'	Stadium: JL Murphy Reserve

15 August 2018	Bentleigh Greens (Australia)	0–0	(Australia) Melbourne Victory	Cheltenham
19:30 AEST		Report		Stadium: Kingston Heath Soccer Complex

1 September 2018	Melbourne Victory (Australia)	1–1	(Australia) Brisbane Roar	Morwell
14:30 AEST	Broxham 20'	Report	Taggart 22'	Stadium: Latrobe City Sports & Entertainment Centre; Attendance: 1,638; Referee: Kate Jacewicz

8 September 2018	Melbourne Victory (Australia)	1–1	(Australia) Western Sydney Wanderers	Ballarat
14:30 AEST	Troisi 18'	Report	Bonevacia 79'	Stadium: Morshead Park

5 October 2018	Melbourne Victory (Australia)	1–3	(New Zealand) Wellington Phoenix	Melbourne
12:30 AEST	Honda (?)	Report	Krishna (?)	Stadium: AAMI Park; Attendance: 0 (behind closed doors)

12 October 2018	Adelaide United (Australia)	2–1	(Australia) Melbourne Victory	Adelaide
ACST	Strain 72'; Blackwood 84'	Report	Marrone 67' (o.g.)	Stadium: Coopers Stadium

== Competitions ==
=== Overall ===
Competition	Started round	Final position / round	First match	Last match
A-League	—	3rd	20 October 2018	27 April 2019
A-League Finals	Elimination-finals	Semi-finals	3 May 2019	12 May 2019
FFA Cup	Round of 32	Round of 16	7 August 2018	21 August 2018
AFC Champions League	Group stage	Group stage	5 March 2019	22 May 2019

=== A-League ===
==== League table ====
Pos	Team	Pld	W	D	L	GF	GA	GD	Pts	Qualification
1	Perth Glory	27	18	6	3	56	23	+33	60	Qualification for 2020 AFC Champions League group stage and Finals series (Note: The top two teams enter the Finals series at the semi-finals, while the teams ranked third to sixth enter the Finals series at the elimination-finals.)
2	Sydney FC (C)	27	16	4	7	43	29	+14	52	Qualification for 2020 AFC Champions League group stage and Finals series
3	Melbourne Victory	27	15	5	7	50	32	+18	50	Qualification for 2020 AFC Champions League preliminary round 2 and Finals series
4	Adelaide United	27	12	8	7	37	32	+5	44	Qualification for Finals series
5	Melbourne City	27	11	7	9	39	32	+7	40	Qualification for Finals series
6	Wellington Phoenix (Note: Wellington Phoenix cannot qualify for the AFC Champions League as they are not recognised as an AFC club.)	27	11	7	9	46	43	+3	40	Qualification for Finals series
7	Newcastle Jets	27	10	5	12	40	36	+4	35	
8	Western Sydney Wanderers	27	6	6	15	42	54	−12	24	
9	Brisbane Roar	27	4	6	17	38	71	−33	18	
10	Central Coast Mariners	27	3	4	20	31	70	−39	13	

Source: A-Leagues
Rules for classification: 1) points; 2) goal difference; 3) number of goals scored.
(C) Champions

==== Results summary ====
Overall								Home						Away					
Pld	W	D	L	GF	GA	GD	Pts	W	D	L	GF	GA	GD	W	D	L	GF	GA	GD
27	15	5	7	50	32	+18	50	7	3	4	27	19	+8	8	2	3	23	13	+10

Last updated: 27 April 2019.
Source: ultimatealeague.com

==== Results by round ====
Round	1	2	3	4	5	6	7	8	9	10	11	12	13	14	15	16	17	18	19	20	21	22	23	24	25	26	27
Ground	H	H	A	H	A	H	H	A	A	H	A	A	H	H	A	H	A	H	A	H	H	H	A	A	H	A	A
Result	L	L	W	W	W	W	W	W	D	D	W	L	W	D	W	W	W	L	D	D	L	W	W	L	W	L	W
Position	9	10	7	4	2	2	2	2	2	2	2	2	2	3	3	2	2	2	2	2	3	3	3	3	3	3	3

Updated to match(es) played on 27 April 2019. Source: ultimatealeague.com
A = Away; H = Home; W = Win; D = Draw; L = Loss

==== Matches ====
Win Draw Loss

20 October 2018 1	Melbourne Victory	1–2	Melbourne City	Melbourne
19:50 AEDT	Honda 28'	Report	de Laet 40'; McGree 70'	Stadium: Marvel Stadium; Attendance: 40,504; Referee: Kurt Ams

28 October 2018 2	Melbourne Victory	2–3	Perth Glory	Melbourne
19:00 AEDT	Antonis 47'; Roux 87'	Report	Chianese 8'; Keogh 23'; Ikonomidis 90+3'	Stadium: AAMI Park; Attendance: 17,219; Referee: Jonathan Barreiro

3 November 2018 3	Newcastle Jets	0–1	Melbourne Victory	Newcastle
19:50 AEDT		Report	Antonis 71'	Stadium: McDonald Jones Stadium; Attendance: 11,813; Referee: Chris Beath

11 November 2018 4	Melbourne Victory	4–1	Central Coast Mariners	Melbourne
19:00 AEDT	Honda 30'; Troisi 35'; Brown 45+2'; Hope 90+4'	Report	Shabow 63'	Stadium: AAMI Park; Attendance: 16,508; Referee: Stephan Lucas

25 November 2018 5	Sydney FC	1–2	Melbourne Victory	Sydney
17:00 AEDT	Le Fondre 35'	Report	Toivonen 23'; Honda 71' (pen.)	Stadium: Jubilee Oval; Attendance: 19,081; Referee: Peter Green

1 December 2018 6	Melbourne Victory	4–0	Western Sydney Wanderers	Melbourne
19:50 AEDT	Honda 11'; Baena 31'; Barbarouses 39' (pen.); Antonis 89'	Report		Stadium: Marvel Stadium; Attendance: 19,556; Referee: Chris Beath

8 December 2018 7	Melbourne Victory	2–0	Adelaide United	Melbourne
19:50 AEDT	Barbarouses 62'; Toivonen 81'	Report		Stadium: Marvel Stadium; Attendance: 20,629; Referee: Shaun Evans

14 December 2018 8	Brisbane Roar	2–4	Melbourne Victory	Brisbane
19:50 AEDT	Taggart 27' (pen.); Toivonen 42' (o.g.)	Report	Barbarouses 13', 45+2'; Toivonen 32'; Honda 40' (pen.)	Stadium: Suncorp Stadium; Attendance: 10,289; Referee: Adam Fielding

22 December 2018 9	Melbourne City	1–1	Melbourne Victory	Melbourne
19:50 AEDT	Vidošić 90+2'	Report	Toivonen 55'	Stadium: AAMI Park; Attendance: 24,306; Referee: Shaun Evans

28 December 2018 10	Melbourne Victory	1–1	Wellington Phoenix	Melbourne
19:50 AEDT	Toivonen 77'	Report	Williams 62'	Stadium: AAMI Park; Attendance: 20,066; Referee: Daniel Elder

5 January 2019 11	Western Sydney Wanderers	1–2	Melbourne Victory	Sydney
19:50 AEDT	Baumjohann 74' (pen.)	Report	Toivonen 45', 86'	Stadium: ANZ Stadium; Attendance: 7,062; Referee: Jarred Gillett

9 January 2019 12	Adelaide United	2–0	Melbourne Victory	Adelaide
19:50 AEDT	Goodwin 18'; Ilsø 21'	Report		Stadium: Coopers Stadium; Attendance: 12,115; Referee: Shaun Evans

12 January 2019 13	Melbourne Victory	2–1	Newcastle Jets	Melbourne
19:50 AEDT	Antonis 48'; Troisi 84'	Report	Sheppard 78'	Stadium: AAMI Park; Attendance: 16,694; Referee: Daniel Elder

15 January 2019 15	Brisbane Roar	0–5	Melbourne Victory	Brisbane
19:50 AEDT		Report	Toivonen 14'; Barbarouses 48' (pen.), 72', 87'; Roux 65'	Stadium: Suncorp Stadium; Attendance: 7,131; Referee: Jonathan Barreiro

20 January 2019 14	Melbourne Victory	3–3	Wellington Phoenix	Melbourne
17:00 AEDT	Toivonen 5'; Troisi 56'; Barbarouses 88'	Report	Williams 7'; Krishna 20' (pen.), 28'	Stadium: AAMI Park; Attendance: 18,136; Referee: Jarred Gillett

26 January 2019 16	Melbourne Victory	2–1	Sydney FC	Melbourne
19:50 AEDT	Toivonen 20'; Troisi 58'	Report	Ninković 63'	Stadium: AAMI Park; Attendance: 21,085; Referee: Shaun Evans

2 February 2019 17	Central Coast Mariners	2–3	Melbourne Victory	Gosford
17:35 AEDT	Hoole 18', 45+4'	Report	Troisi 50'; Kennedy 68' (o.g.); Barbarouses 88'	Stadium: Central Coast Stadium; Attendance: 5,223; Referee: Kurt Ams

10 February 2019 18	Melbourne Victory	1–2	Perth Glory	Melbourne
17:00 AEDT	Barbarouses 78'	Report	Kilkenny 61' (pen.); Castro 69'	Stadium: AAMI Park; Attendance: 25,071; Referee: Jarred Gillett

15 February 2019 19	Wellington Phoenix	1–1	Melbourne Victory	Auckland
19:35 NZDT	Krishna 57'	Report	Honda 67' (pen.)	Stadium: Eden Park; Attendance: 23,648; Referee: Peter Green

23 February 2019 20	Melbourne Victory	1–1	Melbourne City	Melbourne
19:50 AEDT	Barbarouses 50'	Report	Maclaren 16' (pen.)	Stadium: Marvel Stadium; Attendance: 32,431; Referee: Peter Green

2 March 2019 21	Melbourne Victory	0–2	Newcastle Jets	Geelong
19:50 AEDT		Report	Koutroumbis 34'; D. Petratos 90+6'	Stadium: GMHBA Stadium; Attendance: 8,039; Referee: Shaun Evans

16 March 2019 22	Melbourne Victory	2–1	Brisbane Roar	Melbourne
19:50 AEDT	Barbarouses 24', 39'	Report	Bauthéac 50'	Stadium: Marvel Stadium; Attendance: 16,357; Referee: Chris Beath

30 March 2019 23	Perth Glory	0–2	Melbourne Victory	Perth
22:00 AEDT		Report	Toivonen 25'; Honda 67' (pen.)	Stadium: HBF Park; Attendance: 17,856; Referee: Shaun Evans

6 April 2019 24	Sydney FC	2–1	Melbourne Victory	Sydney
19:50 AEDT	O'Neill 6'; Ninković 90+3'	Report	Barbarouses 16'	Stadium: Sydney Cricket Ground; Attendance: 14,155; Referee: Alex King

14 April 2019 25	Melbourne Victory	2–1	Central Coast Mariners	Melbourne
17:00 AEDT	Toivonen 21'; Niedermeier 79'	Report	Simon 53' (pen.)	Stadium: AAMI Park; Attendance: 16,158; Referee: Chris Beath

19 April 2019 26	Adelaide United	1–0	Melbourne Victory	Adelaide
19:50 AEDT	Blackwood 81'	Report		Stadium: Coopers Stadium; Attendance: 12,866; Referee: Peter Green

27 April 2019 27	Western Sydney Wanderers	0–1	Melbourne Victory	Sydney
19:50 AEDT		Report	Toivonen 22'	Stadium: ANZ Stadium; Attendance: 7,919; Referee: Chris Beath

==== Finals series ====
3 May 2019 Elimination-final	Melbourne Victory	3–1	Wellington Phoenix	Melbourne
19:50 AEST	Niedermeier 42'; Toivonen 53'; Barbarouses 71'	Report	Krishna 64'	Stadium: AAMI Park; Attendance: 16,010; Referee: Shaun Evans

12 May 2019 Semi-final	Sydney FC	6–1	Melbourne Victory	Sydney
19:00 AEST	Calver 3'; Brosque 43'; Broxham 45+2' (o.g.); Le Fondre 63' (pen.), 68'; Ninkovic 88'	Report	Toivonen 90+1'	Stadium: Netstrata Jubilee Stadium; Attendance: 12,141; Referee: Chris Beath

=== FFA Cup ===
7 August 2018 Round of 32	Perth Glory	0–1	Melbourne Victory	Perth
18:30 AWST		Report	Barbarouses 38'	Stadium: Dorrien Gardens; Attendance: 1,754; Referee: Shaun Evans

21 August 2018 Round of 16	APIA Leichhardt Tigers	3–2	Melbourne Victory	Sydney
19:30	Sekiya 9', 47'; Millgate 80'	Report	Athiu 60', 66'	Stadium: Leichhardt Oval; Attendance: 2,467; Referee: Ben Abraham

=== AFC Champions League ===
==== Group stage ====
Pos	Team	Pld	W	D	L	GF	GA	GD	Pts	Qualification
1	(Japan) Sanfrecce Hiroshima	6	5	0	1	9	4	+5	15	Advance to knockout stage
2	(China) Guangzhou Evergrande	6	3	1	2	9	5	+4	10	Advance to knockout stage
3	(South Korea) Daegu FC	6	3	0	3	10	6	+4	9	
4	(Australia) Melbourne Victory	6	0	1	5	4	17	−13	1	

Source: AFC
Rules for classification: Group stage tiebreakers

5 March 2019 1	Melbourne Victory (Australia)	1–3	(South Korea) Daegu FC	Melbourne, Australia
19:30 AEDT	Toivonen 29'	Report	Cesinha 31'; S.M. Hwang 51'; Edgar 61'	Stadium: Melbourne Rectangular Stadium; Attendance: 5,572; Referee: Alireza Faghani (Iran)

12 March 2019 2	Sanfrecce Hiroshima (Japan)	2–1	(Australia) Melbourne Victory	Hiroshima, Japan
19:00 JST	Higashi 3'; Watari 86'	Report	Honda 71'	Stadium: Hiroshima Big Arch; Attendance: 8,968; Referee: Ali Sabah (Iraq)

10 April 2019 3	Guangzhou Evergrande (China)	4–0	(Australia) Melbourne Victory	Guangzhou, China
20:00 CST	Talisca 6', 10'; Yang 42'; Broxham 73' (o.g.)	Report		Stadium: Tianhe Stadium; Referee: Ammar Al-Jeneibi (United Arab Emirates)

23 April 2019 4	Melbourne Victory (Australia)	1–1	(China) Guangzhou Evergrande	Melbourne, Australia
19:30 AEST	Ingham 26'	Report	Huang 24'	Stadium: Melbourne Rectangular Stadium; Attendance: 10,041; Referee: Nawaf Shukralla (Bahrain)

8 May 2019 5	Daegu FC (South Korea)	4–0	(Australia) Melbourne Victory	Daegu, South Korea
19:00 KST	Edgar 9' (pen.); T. W. Jeong 53'; D. W. Kim 80'; S. H. Jung 61'	Report		Stadium: DGB Daegu Bank Park; Referee: Abdulrahman Al-Jassim (Qatar)

22 May 2019 6	Melbourne Victory (Australia)	1–3	(Japan) Sanfrecce Hiroshima	Melbourne, Australia
20:00 AEST	Toivonen 70'	Report	Matsumoto 5'; Minagawa 73'; Morishima 75'	Stadium: Melbourne Rectangular Stadium; Attendance: 6,053; Referee: Turki Al-Khudhayr (Saudi Arabia)
