= 2017–18 Melbourne Victory FC season =

Melbourne Victory
2017–18 season
- Chairman: Anthony Di Pietro
- Manager: Kevin Muscat
- Stadium: AAMI Park & Etihad Stadium, Melbourne
- A-League: 4th
- A-League Finals Series: Champions
- FFA Cup: Round of 16
- AFC Champions League: Group stage
- Top goalscorer: League: Besart Berisha (13 goals); All: Besart Berisha (18 goals)
- Highest home attendance: 35,792 vs Melbourne City (14 October 2017)
- Lowest home attendance: 8,370 vs Central Coast Mariners (6 January 2018)
- Average home league attendance: 17,631
Home colours	Away colours

The 2017–18 Melbourne Victory FC season was the club's 13th season since its establishment in 2004. The club participated in the A-League for the 13th time, the FFA Cup for the fourth time, as well as the AFC Champions League for the sixth time.

== Players ==
=== Squad information ===
Note: Flags indicate national team as defined under FIFA eligibility rules; some limited exceptions apply. Players may hold more than one non-FIFA nationality.

No.	Pos.	Nation	Player
1	GK	AUS	Matt Acton
4	DF	AUS	Rhys Williams
6	MF	AUS	Leigh Broxham (vice-captain)
7	FW	AUS	Kenny Athiu (on loan from Heidelberg United)
8	FW	KOS	Besart Berisha
9	FW	NZL	Kosta Barbarouses
10	FW	AUS	James Troisi
11	FW	AUS	Mitch Austin
14	DF	AUS	Thomas Deng
15	MF	AUS	Cameron McGilp
16	MF	AUS	Josh Hope

No.	Pos.	Nation	Player
17	DF	AUS	James Donachie
18	MF	ARG	Matías Sánchez
19	FW	AUS	Pierce Waring
20	GK	AUS	Lawrence Thomas
21	MF	AUS	Carl Valeri (Captain)
22	MF	AUS	Stefan Nigro
23	FW	NZL	Jai Ingham
24	MF	AUS	Terry Antonis
31	FW	AUS	Christian Theoharous (Youth)
40	GK	AUS	Matt Sutton (Scholarship)
41	FW	NED	Leroy George

=== From youth squad ===
N	Pos.	Nat.	Name	Age	Notes
15	MF	(Australia)	Cameron McGilp	19	
16	MF	(Australia)	Josh Hope	19	
19	FW	(Australia)	Pierce Waring	18	
40	GK	(Australia)	Matt Sutton	17	2.5 year scholarship contract

=== Transfers in ===
No.	Position	Player	Transferred from	Type/fee	Contract length	Date	Ref
4	DF	Rhys Williams	Perth Glory	Free transfer	2 years	15 May 2017	
14	DF	Thomas Deng	(Netherlands) Jong PSV	Loan return		15 May 2017	
9	FW	(New Zealand) Kosta Barbarouses		Free transfer	2 years	13 June 2017	
5	MF	Mark Milligan		Free transfer	1 year	31 July 2017	
18	MF	(Argentina) Matías Sánchez	(Argentina) Temperley	Free transfer	1 year	16 August 2017	
41	MF	(Netherlands) Leroy George		Free transfer	1 year	16 September 2017	
7	FW	Kenny Athiu	(Australia) Heidelberg United	Loan	1 year	13 October 2017	
24	MF	Terry Antonis		Free transfer	2.5 years	3 January 2018	
3	DF	Dino Djulbic		Injury replacement contract	2 weeks	3 January 2018	

=== Transfers out ===
No.	Position	Player	Transferred to	Type/fee	Date	Ref
5	DF	(North Macedonia) Daniel Georgievski	Newcastle Jets	Free transfer	30 March 2017	
14	FW	(Tunisia) Fahid Ben Khalfallah		End of contract	26 April 2017	
16	MF	Rashid Mahazi		Retired	10 May 2017	
4	DF	Nick Ansell		End of contract	12 May 2017	
15	DF	(Spain) Alan Baró		End of contract	12 May 2017	
19	FW	George Howard		End of contract	12 May 2017	
27	GK	Alastair Bray		End of contract	12 May 2017	
30	GK	Lucas Spinella		End of contract	12 May 2017	
7	MF	(New Zealand) Marco Rojas	(Netherlands) Heerenveen	Undisclosed	26 July 2017	
3	DF	Dino Djulbic		End of contract	18 January 2018	
5	MF	Mark Milligan	(Saudi Arabia) Al-Ahli	$1,000,000	28 January 2018	
2	DF	Jason Geria	(Japan) JEF United Chiba	$800,000	3 March 2018	

=== Contract extensions ===
No.	Name	Position	Duration	Date	Notes
40	Matt Acton	Goalkeeper	1 year	16 May 2017	
10	James Troisi	Winger	2 years	26 July 2017	
8	(Kosovo) Besart Berisha	Striker	1 year	21 December 2017	
1	Matt Acton	Goalkeeper	2 years	16 February 2018	

== Technical staff ==
Position	Name
Manager	(Australia) Kevin Muscat
Assistant manager	(Australia) Jean-Paul de Marigny
Goalkeeping coach	(Australia) Dean Anastasiadis
Youth Team Manager	(Australia) Gareth Naven
Youth Team Assistant Manager	(New Zealand) Vaughan Coveny
Youth Team Developmental Manager	(Scotland) Grant Brebner
Youth goalkeeping coach	Vacant
Strength & Conditioning Coach	(Australia) Anthony Crea
Physiotherapist	(Australia) Travis Maude

== Statistics ==
=== Squad statistics ===
N	Pos.	Nat.	Name	Total					A-League					A-League Finals Series					FFA Cup					AFC Champions League
N	Pos.	Nat.	Name	Apps	Goals	Yellow card	Second yellow card	Red card	Apps	Goals	Yellow card	Second yellow card	Red card	Apps	Goals	Yellow card	Second yellow card	Red card	Apps	Goals	Yellow card	Second yellow card	Red card	Apps	Goals	Yellow card	Second yellow card	Red card
1	GK	(Australia)	Matt Acton	4	0	0	0	0	2+1	0	0	0	0	0+0	0	0	0	0	0+0	0	0	0	0	1+0	0	0	0	0
4	DF	(Australia)	Rhys Williams	32	2	12	0	1	24+0	1	8	0	1	1+0	0	1	0	0	2+0	0	1	0	0	5+0	1	2	0	0
6	MF	(Australia)	Leigh Broxham	35	0	6	0	0	20+4	0	5	0	0	3+0	0	1	0	0	2+0	0	0	0	0	5+1	0	0	0	0
7	MF	(Australia)	Kenny Athiu	11	2	0	0	0	0+4	1	0	0	0	0+2	0	0	0	0	0+0	0	0	0	0	1+4	1	0	0	0
8	FW	(Kosovo)	Besart Berisha	35	18	2	0	0	25+0	13	1	0	0	3+0	1	1	0	0	2+0	2	0	0	0	5+0	2	0	0	0
9	FW	(New Zealand)	Kosta Barbarouses	32	12	3	0	1	22+0	8	2	0	1	3+0	2	0	0	0	2+0	0	0	0	0	5+0	2	1	0	0
10	FW	(Australia)	James Troisi	32	5	8	0	0	21+1	3	6	0	0	3+0	1	1	0	0	2+0	1	1	0	0	5+0	0	0	0	0
11	FW	(Australia)	Mitch Austin	7	2	1	1	0	3+2	1	1	1	0	0+0	0	0	0	0	2+0	1	0	0	0	0+0	0	0	0	0
14	DF	(Australia)	Thomas Deng	29	2	6	0	0	20+1	2	5	0	0	3+0	0	0	0	0	0+0	0	0	0	0	4+1	0	1	0	0
15	MF	(Australia)	Cameron McGilp	2	0	0	0	0	0+0	0	0	0	0	0+0	0	0	0	0	0+1	0	0	0	0	0+1	0	0	0	0
16	MF	(Australia)	Josh Hope	12	0	2	0	0	0+5	0	0	0	0	0+0	0	0	0	0	0+2	0	1	0	0	2+3	0	1	0	0
17	DF	(Australia)	James Donachie	23	0	4	0	0	10+2	0	2	0	0	3+0	0	1	0	0	2+0	0	1	0	0	6+0	0	0	0	0
18	MF	(Argentina)	Matías Sánchez	25	0	8	0	0	14+8	0	6	0	0	0+3	0	2	0	0	0+0	0	0	0	0	0+0	0	0	0	0
19	FW	(Australia)	Pierce Waring	2	1	0	0	0	0+1	0	0	0	0	0+0	0	0	0	0	0+0	0	0	0	0	1+0	1	0	0	0
20	GK	(Australia)	Lawrence Thomas	35	0	1	0	0	25+0	0	1	0	0	3+0	0	0	0	0	2+0	0	0	0	0	5+0	0	0	0	0
21	MF	(Australia)	Carl Valeri	33	0	10	0	0	23+2	0	6	0	0	3+0	0	1	0	0	1+0	0	0	0	0	4+0	0	3	0	0
22	MF	(Australia)	Stefan Nigro	23	0	2	0	0	10+6	0	1	0	0	2+0	0	0	0	0	1+1	0	0	0	0	3+0	0	1	0	0
23	FW	(New Zealand)	Jai Ingham	25	1	0	0	0	6+14	0	0	0	0	0+0	0	0	0	0	0+2	0	0	0	0	1+2	1	0	0	0
24	MF	(Australia)	Terry Antonis	22	1	5	0	0	10+4	0	2	0	0	3+0	1	1	0	0	0+0	0	0	0	0	5+0	0	2	0	0
25	MF	(Australia)	Birkan Kirdar	1	0	0	0	0	0+0	0	0	0	0	0+0	0	0	0	0	0+0	0	0	0	0	0+1	0	0	0	0
26	MF	(Australia)	Nicholas Sette	0	0	0	0	0	0+0	0	0	0	0	0+0	0	0	0	0	0+0	0	0	0	0	0+0	0	0	0	0
27	DF	(Australia)	Callum Goulding	0	0	0	0	0	0+0	0	0	0	0	0+0	0	0	0	0	0+0	0	0	0	0	0+0	0	0	0	0
30	GK	(Australia)	Stephen Hatzikourtis	0	0	0	0	0	0+0	0	0	0	0	0+0	0	0	0	0	0+0	0	0	0	0	0+0	0	0	0	0
31	FW	(Australia)	Christian Theoharous	24	1	1	0	0	2+14	1	1	0	0	0+2	0	0	0	0	0+0	0	0	0	0	1+5	0	0	0	0
40	GK	(Australia)	Matt Sutton	0	0	0	0	0	0+0	0	0	0	0	0+0	0	0	0	0	0+0	0	0	0	0	0+0	0	0	0	0
41	MF	(Netherlands)	Leroy George	34	12	4	0	0	24+2	8	4	0	0	3+0	1	0	0	0	0+0	0	0	0	0	5+0	3	0	0	0
Players no longer at the club:
2	DF	(Australia)	Jason Geria	25	0	4	1	0	20+1	0	3	1	0	0+0	0	0	0	0	2+0	0	1	0	0	2+0	0	0	0	0
3	DF	(Australia)	Dino Djulbic	3	0	0	0	0	3+0	0	0	0	0	0+0	0	0	0	0	0+0	0	0	0	0	0+0	0	0	0	0
5	MF	(Australia)	Mark Milligan	15	4	2	0	1	12+1	3	1	0	1	0+0	0	0	0	0	2+0	1	1	0	0	0+0	0	0	0	0

- Last updated: 5 May 2018
- Source: au.soccerway.com
- (yellow card) = Number of bookings; (second yellow card) = Number of sending offs after a second yellow card; (red card) = Number of sending offs by a direct red card.

== Pre-season and friendlies ==
25 July 2017	Port Melbourne (Australia)	0–3	(Australia) Melbourne Victory	Melbourne, Australia
19:30 AEST		Report	Goulding 55'; Theoharous 79'; Waring 89'	Stadium: SS Anderson Reserve

2 August 2017	Bentleigh Greens (Australia)	0–5	(Australia) Melbourne Victory	Melbourne, Australia
19:30 AEST		Report	Berisha 7'; Austin 33'; Barbarouses 56', 61', 90'	Stadium: Kingston Heath Soccer Complex

16 August 2017	Oakleigh Cannons (Australia)	2–5	(Australia) Melbourne Victory	Melbourne, Australia
19:30 AEST	Podaridis 22'; Piemonte 48'	Report	Austin 25', 31'; J. Ingham 69'; Sette 73'; Waring 78'	Stadium: Jack Edwards Reserve

1 September 2017	Melbourne Victory (Australia)	3–1	(Australia) Brisbane Roar	Ballarat, Australia
19:30 AEST	Berisha 14', 66'; J. Ingham 19'	Report	Skapetis 31'	Stadium: Morshead Park Stadium

20 September 2017	Melbourne Victory (Australia)	0–2	(Australia) Central Coast Mariners	Melbourne, Australia
13:30 AEST		Report	Asdrúbal 40'; Brama 72'	Stadium: AAMI Park

== Competitions ==
=== Overall ===
Competition	Started round	Final position / round	First match	Last match
A-League	—	4th	7 October 2017	14 April 2018
A-League Finals	Elimination-finals	Champions	22 April 2018	5 May 2018
FFA Cup	Round of 32	Round of 16	9 August 2017	23 August 2017
AFC Champions League	Group stage	Group stage	13 February 2018	18 April 2018

=== A-League ===
==== League table ====
Pos	Team	Pld	W	D	L	GF	GA	GD	Pts	Qualification
1	Sydney FC	27	20	4	3	64	22	+42	64	Qualification for 2019 AFC Champions League group stage and Finals series
2	Newcastle Jets	27	15	5	7	57	37	+20	50	Qualification for 2019 AFC Champions League second preliminary round and Finals series
3	Melbourne City	27	13	4	10	41	33	+8	43	Qualification for Finals series
4	Melbourne Victory (C)	27	12	5	10	43	37	+6	41	Qualification for 2019 AFC Champions League group stage and Finals series
5	Adelaide United	27	11	6	10	36	38	−2	39	Qualification for Finals series
6	Brisbane Roar	27	10	5	12	33	40	−7	35	Qualification for Finals series
7	Western Sydney Wanderers	27	8	9	10	38	47	−9	33	
8	Perth Glory	27	10	2	15	37	50	−13	32	
9	Wellington Phoenix (Note: Wellington Phoenix cannot qualify for the AFC Champions League as they are not recognised as an AFC club.)	27	5	6	16	31	55	−24	21	
10	Central Coast Mariners	27	4	8	15	28	49	−21	20	

Source: A-Leagues
Rules for classification: 1) points; 2) goal difference; 3) number of goals scored.
(C) Champions

==== Results summary ====
Overall								Home						Away					
Pld	W	D	L	GF	GA	GD	Pts	W	D	L	GF	GA	GD	W	D	L	GF	GA	GD
27	12	5	10	43	37	+6	41	6	3	5	25	20	+5	6	2	5	18	17	+1

Last updated: 13 April 2018.
Source: ultimatealeague.com

==== Results by round ====
Round	1	2	3	4	5	6	7	8	9	10	11	12	13	14	15	16	17	18	19	20	21	22	23	24	25	26	27
Ground	H	H	A	A	H	H	A	A	A	H	A	A	H	H	A	H	A	H	A	H	H	A	H	A	H	H	A
Result	L	L	D	D	D	D	W	L	W	L	W	W	W	D	L	W	W	L	L	L	W	W	W	L	W	W	W
Position	8	9	7	8	7	9	6	8	6	7	5	5	3	5	5	4	4	4	5	5	4	4	3	4	4	4	4

Updated to match(es) played on 15 April 2018. Source: ultimatealeague.com
A = Away; H = Home; W = Win; D = Draw; L = Loss

==== Matches ====
7 October 2017 1	Melbourne Victory	0–1	Sydney FC	Melbourne
19:50 AEDT		Report	Deng 53' (o.g.)	Stadium: Etihad Stadium; Attendance: 24,804; Referee: Kris Griffiths-Jones

14 October 2017 2	Melbourne Victory	1–2	Melbourne City	Melbourne
19:50 AEDT	George 55'	Report	Budziński 45+3'; Kamau 64'	Stadium: Etihad Stadium; Attendance: 35,792; Referee: Peter Green

20 October 2017 3	Adelaide United	2–2	Melbourne Victory	Adelaide
19:20 ACDT	Lia 23', 62'	Report	Berisha 13'; Austin 82'	Stadium: Adelaide Oval; Attendance: 19,416; Referee: Shaun Evans

29 October 2017 4	Central Coast Mariners	1–1	Melbourne Victory	Gosford
19:00 AEDT	Pain 58'	Report	George 66'	Stadium: Central Coast Stadium; Attendance: 5,519; Referee: Adam Fielding

6 November 2017 5	Melbourne Victory	1–1	Western Sydney Wanderers	Melbourne
19:50 AEDT	Deng 49'	Report	Riera 32'	Stadium: Etihad Stadium; Attendance: 21,577; Referee: Peter Green

11 November 2017 6	Melbourne Victory	1–1	Brisbane Roar	Melbourne
19:50 AEDT	Berisha 79'	Report	Holman 84'	Stadium: Etihad Stadium; Attendance: 18,098; Referee: Kris Griffiths-Jones

19 November 2017 7	Perth Glory	0–2	Melbourne Victory	Perth
16:00 AWST		Report	Berisha 56'; George 67'	Stadium: nib Stadium; Attendance: 13,565; Referee: Jonathan Barreiro

23 November 2017 8	Newcastle Jets	4–1	Melbourne Victory	Newcastle
19:50 AEDT	Georgievski 13'; Nabbout 37', 83'; Champness 75'	Report	Barbarouses 5'	Stadium: McDonald Jones Stadium; Attendance: 8,427; Referee: Stephan Lucas

3 December 2017 9	Wellington Phoenix	2–3	Melbourne Victory	Wellington
16:30 NZDT	Kaluđerović 29', 31'	Report	Berisha 54'; Paracki 57' (o.g.); Troisi 87'	Stadium: Westpac Stadium; Attendance: 5,765; Referee: Alex King

8 December 2017 10	Melbourne Victory	1–2	Adelaide United	Melbourne
19:50 AEDT	Milligan 56'	Report	Diawara 17'; Blackwood 72'	Stadium: Etihad Stadium; Attendance: 16,778; Referee: Kurt Ams

17 December 2017 11	Brisbane Roar	1–2	Melbourne Victory	Brisbane
18:00 AEST	Maccarone 56'	Report	Williams 12'; Barbarouses 19'	Stadium: Suncorp Stadium; Attendance: 10,225; Referee: Peter Green

23 December 2017 12	Melbourne City	0–1	Melbourne Victory	Melbourne
19:50 AEDT		Report	Milligan 90+6' (pen.)	Stadium: AAMI Park; Attendance: 22,515; Referee: Jarred Gillett

29 December 2017 13	Melbourne Victory	2–1	Newcastle Jets	Melbourne
19:50 AEDT	Barbarouses 33'; Berisha 53'	Report	Hoffman 45+1'	Stadium: AAMI Park; Attendance: 15,534; Referee: Chris Beath

6 January 2018 14	Melbourne Victory	1–1	Central Coast Mariners	Geelong
18:00 AEDT	Berisha 49'	Report	Powell 71'	Stadium: GMHBA Stadium; Attendance: 8,370; Referee: Jonathan Barreiro

10 January 2018 15	Wellington Phoenix	2–1	Melbourne Victory	Wellington
19:35 NZDT	Krishna 64'; Milligan 83' (o.g.)	Report	Barbarouses 40'	Stadium: Westpac Stadium; Attendance: 5,105; Referee: Matthew Conger

13 January 2018 16	Melbourne Victory	3–2	Perth Glory	Melbourne
19:50 AEDT	Troisi 27'; Milligan 47'; Barbarouses 90'	Report	Neville 2'; Castro 83'	Stadium: AAMI Park; Attendance: 14,332; Referee: Shaun Evans

19 January 2018 17	Western Sydney Wanderers	0–3	Melbourne Victory	Sydney
19:50 AEDT		Report	Barbarouses 36', 90+2'; Berisha 67'	Stadium: ANZ Stadium; Attendance: 11,864; Referee: Adam Kersey

26 January 2018 18	Melbourne Victory	1–3	Sydney FC	Melbourne
19:50 AEDT	Berisha 58' (pen.)	Report	Bobô 60', 78' (pen.); Carney 84'	Stadium: AAMI Park; Attendance: 21,037; Referee: Jarred Gillett

3 February 2018 19	Newcastle Jets	2–0	Melbourne Victory	Newcastle
17:35 AEDT	Boogaard 31'; McGree 70'	Report		Stadium: McDonald Jones Stadium; Attendance: 11,473; Referee: Shaun Evans

9 February 2018 20	Melbourne Victory	1–2	Brisbane Roar	Melbourne
19:50 AEDT	Troisi 83'	Report	Maccarone 7'; Holman 28'	Stadium: AAMI Park; Attendance: 14,576; Referee: Chris Beath

24 February 2018 21	Melbourne Victory	3–0	Adelaide United	Melbourne
19:50 AEDT	Regan 22' (o.g.); George 29'; Berisha 59'	Report		Stadium: AAMI Park; Attendance: 13,396; Referee: Alex King

2 March 2018 22	Melbourne City	1–2	Melbourne Victory	Melbourne
19:50 AEDT	Fornaroli 54' (pen.)	Report	Barbarouses 12'; George 62'	Stadium: AAMI Park; Attendance: 20,083; Referee: Kris Griffiths-Jones

18 March 2018 23	Melbourne Victory	5–2	Central Coast Mariners	Melbourne
17:00 AEDT	George 15'; Berisha 25', 54', 74'; Theoharous 83'	Report	Pain 87', 90+7'	Stadium: AAMI Park; Attendance: 14,076; Referee: Jarred Gillett

25 March 2018 24	Perth Glory	1–0	Melbourne Victory	Perth
16:00 AWST	Keogh 43'	Report		Stadium: nib Stadium; Attendance: https://www.melbournevictory.com.au/news/report-glory-1-0-victory Referee: Adam Fielding

31 March 2018 25	Melbourne Victory	3–1	Western Sydney Wanderers	Melbourne
19:50 AEDT	George 30'; Berisha 45+7' (pen.); Deng 51'	Report	Cejudo 45+2'	Stadium: AAMI Park; Attendance: 15,280; Referee: Shaun Evans

8 April 2018 26	Melbourne Victory	2–1	Wellington Phoenix	Melbourne
17:00 AEST	George 83' (pen.); Athiu 87'	Report	Broxham 23' (o.g.)	Stadium: AAMI Park; Attendance: 13,182; Referee: Jarred Gillett

13 April 2018 27	Sydney FC	1–0	Melbourne Victory	Sydney
19:50 AEST	Bobô 8'	Report		Stadium: Allianz Stadium; Attendance: 15,567; Referee: Chris Beath

==== Finals series ====
22 April 2018 Elimination-final	Melbourne Victory	2–1	Adelaide United	Melbourne
18:00 AEST	George 63'; Berisha 89'	Report	Mileusnic 57'	Stadium: AAMI Park; Attendance: 15,502; Referee: Chris Beath

28 April 2018 Semi-final	Sydney FC	2–3 (a.e.t.)	Melbourne Victory	Sydney
19:50 AEST	Nigro 23' (o.g.); Antonis 90+4' (o.g.)	Report	Barbarouses 30'; Troisi 46'; Antonis 117'	Stadium: Allianz Stadium; Attendance: 17,775; Referee: Kurt Ams

5 May 2018 Grand Final	Newcastle Jets	0–1	Melbourne Victory	Newcastle
19:50 AEST		Report	Barbarouses 9'	Stadium: McDonald Jones Stadium; Attendance: 29,410; Referee: Jarred Gillett

=== FFA Cup ===
9 August 2017 Round of 32	Brisbane Roar (Queensland)	1–5	(Victoria (state)) Melbourne Victory	Brisbane
19:30 AEST	Skapetis 90'	Report	Austin 26'; Troisi 35'; Berisha 48' (pen.), 74'; Milligan 51' (pen.)	Stadium: Perry Park; Attendance: 3,184; Referee: Chris Beath

23 August 2017 Round of 16	Adelaide United (South Australia)	3–0	(Victoria (state)) Melbourne Victory	Adelaide
19:00 ACST	Absalonsen 53'; Blackwood 66' (pen.); Konstandopoulos 89'	Report		Stadium: Marden Sports Complex; Attendance: 3,342; Referee: Jonathan Barreiro

=== AFC Champions League ===
==== Group stage ====
Pos	Team	Pld	W	D	L	GF	GA	GD	Pts	Qualification
1	(China) Shanghai SIPG	6	3	2	1	10	6	+4	11	Advance to knockout stage
2	(South Korea) Ulsan Hyundai	6	2	3	1	15	11	+4	9	Advance to knockout stage
3	(Australia) Melbourne Victory	6	2	2	2	11	16	−5	8	
4	(Japan) Kawasaki Frontale	6	0	3	3	6	9	−3	3	

Source: AFC
Rules for classification: Group stage tiebreakers

13 February 2018 1	Melbourne Victory (Australia)	3–3	(South Korea) Ulsan Hyundai	Melbourne, Australia
19:30 AEDT	George 26', 37'; Williams 54'	Report	Oršić 24', 51'; Windbichler 34'	Stadium: Melbourne Rectangular Stadium; Attendance: 5,127; Referee: Nawaf Shukralla (Bahrain)

20 February 2018 2	Shanghai SIPG (China)	4–1	(Australia) Melbourne Victory	Shanghai, China
20:00 CST	Hulk 27' (pen.); Wu Lei 41'; Oscar 47', 77'	Report	Berisha 69' (pen.)	Stadium: Shanghai Stadium; Attendance: 16,697; Referee: Ali Sabah (Iraq)

7 March 2018 3	Kawasaki Frontale (Japan)	2–2	(Australia) Melbourne Victory	Kawasaki, Japan
19:00 JST	Elsinho 28'; Noborizato 55'	Report	Berisha 36'; George 90+3' (pen.)	Stadium: Todoroki Athletics Stadium; Attendance: 11,189; Referee: Abdulrahman Al-Jassim (Qatar)

13 March 2018 4	Melbourne Victory (Australia)	1–0	(Japan) Kawasaki Frontale	Melbourne, Australia
19:30 AEDT	Barbarouses 90'	Report		Stadium: Melbourne Rectangular Stadium; Attendance: 6,639; Referee: Ammar Al-Jeneibi (United Arab Emirates)

4 April 2018 5	Ulsan Hyundai (South Korea)	6–2	(Australia) Melbourne Victory	Ulsan, South Korea
19:00 KST	Júnior 12', 67'; Lim 20'; Oršić 38', 75'; Seu.J. Kim 55'	Report	Athiu 72'; Barbarouses 74'	Stadium: Ulsan Munsu Football Stadium; Attendance: 834; Referee: Alireza Faghani (Iran)

18 April 2018 6	Melbourne Victory (Australia)	2–1	(China) Shanghai SIPG	Melbourne, Australia
20:00 AEST	Waring 40'; Ingham 68'	Report	Lin 45'	Stadium: Melbourne Rectangular Stadium; Attendance: 7,148; Referee: Mohammed Al-Khudairi (Saudi Arabia)

== See also ==
- 2017–18 Melbourne Victory FC (women) season
