= Lauton =

Lauton is a surname. Notable people with the surname include:

- Brandon Lauton (born 2000), South African-Australian soccer player
- Jordan Lauton (born 2003), Australian soccer player
