= Josh Hope =

Josh Hope may refer to:

- Josh Hope (Emmerdale), a fictional character from the ITV soap opera Emmerdale
- Josh Hope (soccer) (born 1998), Australian footballer
