= So Nishikawa =

Japanese-Australian soccer player

Personal information
- Full name: So Nishikawa
- Date of birth: 18 June 2001 (age 25)
- Place of birth: Atlanta, Georgia, US
- Position: Defender

Team information
- Current team: Brooklyn FC
- Number: 13

Youth career
- Bentleigh Greens
- 2018–2019: Melbourne Victory

College career
Years	Team	Apps	(Gls)
2021–	San Diego State Aztecs	17	(1)

Senior career*
Years	Team	Apps	(Gls)
2018–2021	Melbourne Victory NPL	28	(0)
2019–2021	Melbourne Victory	4	(0)
- * Club domestic league appearances and goals as of 1 July 2021

So Nishikawa (born 18 June 2001), is a Japanese-Australian professional footballer who plays as a defender for the San Diego State Aztecs.

== Club career ==
=== Melbourne Victory ===
Nishikawa joined the Melbourne Victory Youth prior to the 2018–19 Y-League, and made his debut on 10 November 2018 in a 2–3 loss to Adelaide United. Nishikawa made his debut for the senior squad on 15 March 2020 in 0–3 loss to Wellington Phoenix.

He left the Victory in June 2021 to play for San Diego State Aztecs.

== Career statistics ==
As of 22 February 2020

Club	Season	League			Cup^{[A]}		Continental^{[B]}		Other^{[C]}		Total	
Club	Season	Division	Apps	Goals	Apps	Goals	Apps	Goals	Apps	Goals	Apps	Goals
Melbourne Victory	2019–20	A-League	4	0	–	–	0	0	–	–	4	0
Career total			21	0	0	0	0	0	1	0	22	0

=== Footnotes ===
A. Includes appearances in the FFA Cup.
B. Includes appearances in the AFC Champions League.
C. Includes appearances in the A-League finals.
