= Anthony Lesiotis =

Australian soccer player

Personal information
- Full name: Anthony Lesiotis
- Date of birth: 20 April 2000 (age 26)
- Position: Defensive midfielder

Team information
- Current team: Heidelberg United
- Number: 6

Youth career
- 2017–2019: Melbourne City

Senior career*
Years	Team	Apps	(Gls)
2017–2019	Melbourne City NPL	23	(0)
2018–2019	Melbourne City	1	(0)
2019–2020	Melbourne Victory	23	(0)
2020–2021	Western Sydney Wanderers	0	(0)
2021	Melbourne City NPL	4	(0)
2021–2022	Melbourne City	2	(0)
2023–	Heidelberg United	63	(4)
- * Club domestic league appearances and goals as of 18 September 2025 ‡ National team caps and goals as of 7 August 2018

Anthony Lesiotis (born 24 April 2000) is an Australian professional footballer who plays as a defensive midfielder for Heidelberg United. He previously played for Melbourne Victory, Western Sydney Wanderers and Melbourne City.

== Club career ==
He made his professional debut for Melbourne City on 7 August 2018 in an FFA Cup match against Brisbane Roar.

He signed for crosstown rivals Melbourne Victory on 3 January 2019, becoming the first player to make the switch in that direction.

He debuted for Melbourne Victory against Brisbane Roar on 15 January 2019, coming off the bench as a substitute for Victory captain Carl Valeri.

In September 2020, Lesiotis left Melbourne Victory.

On 5 November 2020, Western Sydney Wanderers announced the signing of Lesiotis on a two-year deal. He was released in April 2021, having not made a single appearance. A couple of weeks later, he returned to Melbourne City, signing a scholarship deal until the end of the 2020–21 A-League season.

== Personal life ==
Lesiotis was born in Australia, and is of Greek descent.

== Career statistics ==
=== Club ===
As of 6 June 2021

Appearances and goals by club, season and competition
Club	Season	League			National Cup		Asia		Other		Total	
Club	Season	Division	Apps	Goals	Apps	Goals	Apps	Goals	Apps	Goals	Apps	Goals
Melbourne City NPL	2017	NPL Victoria 2	11	0	—		—		—		11	0
Melbourne City NPL	2018	NPL Victoria 2	19	0	—		—		—		19	0
Melbourne City NPL	Total		30	0	—		—		—		30	0
Melbourne City	2017–18	A-League	0	0	0	0	—		—		0	0
Melbourne City	2018–19	A-League	1	0	1	0	—		—		2	0
Melbourne City	Total		1	0	1	0	—		—		2	0
Melbourne Victory	2018–19	A-League	6	0	0	0	3	0	—		9	0
Melbourne Victory	2019–20	A-League	17	0	1	0	4	0	—		22	0
Melbourne Victory	Total		23	0	1	0	7	0	—		31	0
Melbourne Victory NPL	2019	NPL Victoria 2	15	0	—		—		—		15	0
Melbourne City	2020–21	A-League	1	0	—		—		—		1	0
Career total			70	0	2	0	7	0	0	0	79	0
