= Kenny Athiu =

South Sudanese footballer

Personal information
- Full name: Kenjok Athiu
- Date of birth: 5 August 1992 (age 34)
- Place of birth: Juba, Sudan (now South Sudan)
- Height: 2.01 m (6 ft 7 in)
- Position: Forward

Team information
- Current team: Brunswick Juventus
- Number: 9

Youth career
- 2006–2010: South Springvale

Senior career*
Years	Team	Apps	(Gls)
2010–2011	South Springvale	36	(17)
2012	Springvale White Eagles	9	(2)
2012–2014	Box Hill United	40	(30)
2014–2017	Heidelberg United	74	(43)
2017–2018	→ Melbourne Victory (loan)	4	(1)
2018–2020	Melbourne Victory	32	(0)
2021–2022	Sri Pahang	11	(4)
2022	Visakha	3	(0)
2022	Essendon Royals	1	(0)
2023	Heidelberg United	16	(1)
2024–2025	Dandenong City	51	(21)
2026–	Brunswick Juventus	6	(0)

International career^{‡}
2019–	South Sudan	7	(0)
- * Club domestic league appearances and goals as of 19 April 2026 ‡ National team caps and goals as of 17 November 2019

Kenjok Athiu (born 5 August 1992) is a South Sudanese professional soccer player who plays as a forward for VPL 1 club Brunswick Juventus.

== Club career ==
=== Youth ===
Athiu joined South Springvale SC in 2006 at 14 years of age, and became a member of the first team three years later. In 2012, Athiu signed a short term deal with rivals Springvale White Eagles, with the success from the Springvale based clubs later earning him a deal with the more prominent Victorian State League side Box Hill United in the same year. Following more success, in 2014 Athiu signed for Heidelberg United in the NPL Victoria.

=== Melbourne Victory ===
After initially being linked with a move to Perth Glory, Athiu signed his first professional contract with Melbourne Victory in October 2017 on a season-long loan from Heidelberg United. Victory coach Kevin Muscat initially stated that it would be some time before Athiu would make the first team due to injury and fitness concerns. Nevertheless, Athiu made his debut for the club as a substitute in a draw with Western Sydney Wanderers on 6 November after a number of Melbourne's attacking players were unavailable for the game. On 18 June 2018, Athiu signed a new two-year contract with Melbourne Victory. On 28 August 2020, Melbourne Victory announced that Athiu would not be receiving a new contract.

== International career ==
Athiu was eligible to represent his nation of birth of South Sudan or his country of residence in Australia prior to making his competitive debut for South Sudan against Equatorial Guinea on 4 September 2019 in the first leg of the first round for the 2022 FIFA World Cup. Athiu was substituted on David Majak Chan at the 54th minute and assisted in the equalizing goal of the eventual 1–1 draw.

== Personal life ==
Athiu was born in Sudan but left with his family as a refugee in the Second Sudanese Civil War, first to Kenya (aged four) and then to Australia (aged eleven). He initially settled in Keysborough, before moving to Noble Park and then Narre Warren.

Athiu has seven siblings, and is good friends with former teammate Thomas Deng, with both their families having known each other since they were children.

== Career statistics ==
As of 22 February 2020

Club	Season	League			Cup^{[A]}		Continental^{[B]}		Other^{[C]}		Total	
Club	Season	Division	Apps	Goals	Apps	Goals	Apps	Goals	Apps	Goals	Apps	Goals
Melbourne Victory	2017–18	Y-League	1	0	–	–	–	–	–	–	1	0
Melbourne Victory	2017–18	A-League	4	1	2	2	5	1	2	0	13	4
Melbourne Victory	2018–19	A-League	14	0	1	0	5	0	2	0	22	0
Melbourne Victory	2019–20	A-League	13	0	0	0	2	0	0	0	15	0
Career total			31	1	3	2	11	1	4	0	51	4

=== Footnotes ===
A. Includes appearances in the FFA Cup.
B. Includes appearances in the AFC Champions League.
C. Includes appearances in the A-League finals.

== Honours ==
=== Club ===
Heidelberg United

- National Premier Leagues: 2017
- National Premier Leagues Victoria Premiership: 2017
- Dockerty Cup: 2017

Melbourne Victory

- A-League Championship: 2017–18

=== Individual ===
- National Premier Leagues Victoria Golden Boot: 2017
