= Brooklyn F.C. =

Brooklyn F.C. may refer to:

- Brooklyn FC (2024), USL Super League women's club
- Brooklyn FC (2026), USL Championship men's club
- Brooklyn Field Club, defunct American soccer club (1898–1924)
- Brooklyn F.C. (Dublin), defunct Irish football club (1920s)
- Brooklyn F.C. (New York), defunct American Soccer League club (1933–1934)
