= Josh Hope (soccer) =

Australian footballer

Personal information
- Full name: Joshua Hope
- Date of birth: 7 January 1998 (age 28)
- Place of birth: Hobart, Tasmania, Australia
- Height: 1.84 m (6 ft 0 in)
- Position: Attacking midfielder

Team information
- Current team: Green Gully
- Number: 16

Youth career
- 2012–2013: FFT NTC

Senior career*
Years	Team	Apps	(Gls)
2013–2014	FFT NTC	41	(28)
2015	FFA CoE	12	(0)
2016–2018	Melbourne Victory NPL	45	(3)
2017–2020	Melbourne Victory	27	(1)
2022–	Green Gully	96	(26)

International career^{‡}
2015	Australia U17	7	(0)
2016	Australia U20	5	(0)
Medal record
Men's football
Representing Australia
AFF U-19 Youth Championship
First place	2016 Vietnam	U-20 Team
- * Club domestic league appearances and goals as of 1 September 2025 ‡ National team caps and goals as of 5 November 2017

Joshua Hope (born 7 January 1998) is an Australian former professional footballer who currently plays as an attacking midfielder for Green Gully SC in NPL Victoria.

== Club career ==
On 5 February 2015, Hope became the first Tasmanian in 23 years to receive an Australian Institute of Sport football scholarship; Hope turned down an NPL Victoria 1 contract with Melbourne Victory to accept the offer from the FFA Centre of Excellence.

In July 2016, Hope made his unofficial senior debut for Melbourne Victory as a substitute in their International Champions Cup match against Juventus FC.

On 9 August 2017, Hope made his professional debut against Brisbane Roar in the FFA Cup as an 80th minute substitute for James Troisi. On 19 September 2017, he signed a professional contract with Melbourne Victory, and made his league debut in a Big Blue, replacing Leroy George in the 65th minute against Sydney FC on 7 October 2017.

On 2 November 2020, Hope announced that he was stepping away from professional football due to online abuse.

In 2022, Hope returned to playing football in the National Premier Leagues Victoria for Green Gully SC. Making his official debut in Green Gully's Round 1 3–2 win against the Oakleigh Cannons FC in which he scored in the 43rd minute and was substituted off in the 74th minute being replaced by Ethan Brooks.

== International career ==
On the 6 September 2015, Hope was selected as captain for the U-17 Joeys pre World Cup tour of France and was later a member of their FIFA U-17 World Cup squad in Chile.

On 2 September 2016, Hope was selected as part of a 23-man Young Socceroos squad for the 2016 AFF U-19 Youth Championship in Vietnam.

== Career statistics ==
=== Club ===
Appearances and goals by club, season and competition
Club	Season	League			FFA/Australia Cup		AFC		Other		Total	
Club	Season	Division	Apps	Goals	Apps	Goals	Apps	Goals	Apps	Goals	Apps	Goals
Melbourne Victory	2017–18	A-League	5	0	2	0	5	0	1	0	13	0
Melbourne Victory	2018–19	A-League	13	1	2	0	2	0	0	0	17	1
Melbourne Victory	2019–20	A-League	9	0	1	0	1	1	0	0	11	1
Green Gully SC	2022	National Premier Leagues Victoria	24	5	4	3	0	0	0	0	28	8
Green Gully SC	2023	National Premier Leagues Victoria	25	7	1	0	0	0	0	0	26	7
Green Gully SC	2024	National Premier Leagues Victoria	24	6	0	0	0	0	0	0	23	6
Green Gully SC	2025	National Premier Leagues Victoria	23	8	2	0	0	0	0	0	25	8
Career total			122	27	12	3	8	1	1	0	143	31

== Honours ==
=== Club ===
Melbourne Victory

- A-League Championship: 2017–18

=== International ===
Australia U20

- AFF U-19 Youth Championship: 2016
