= Terry Antonis =

Australian soccer player (born 1993)

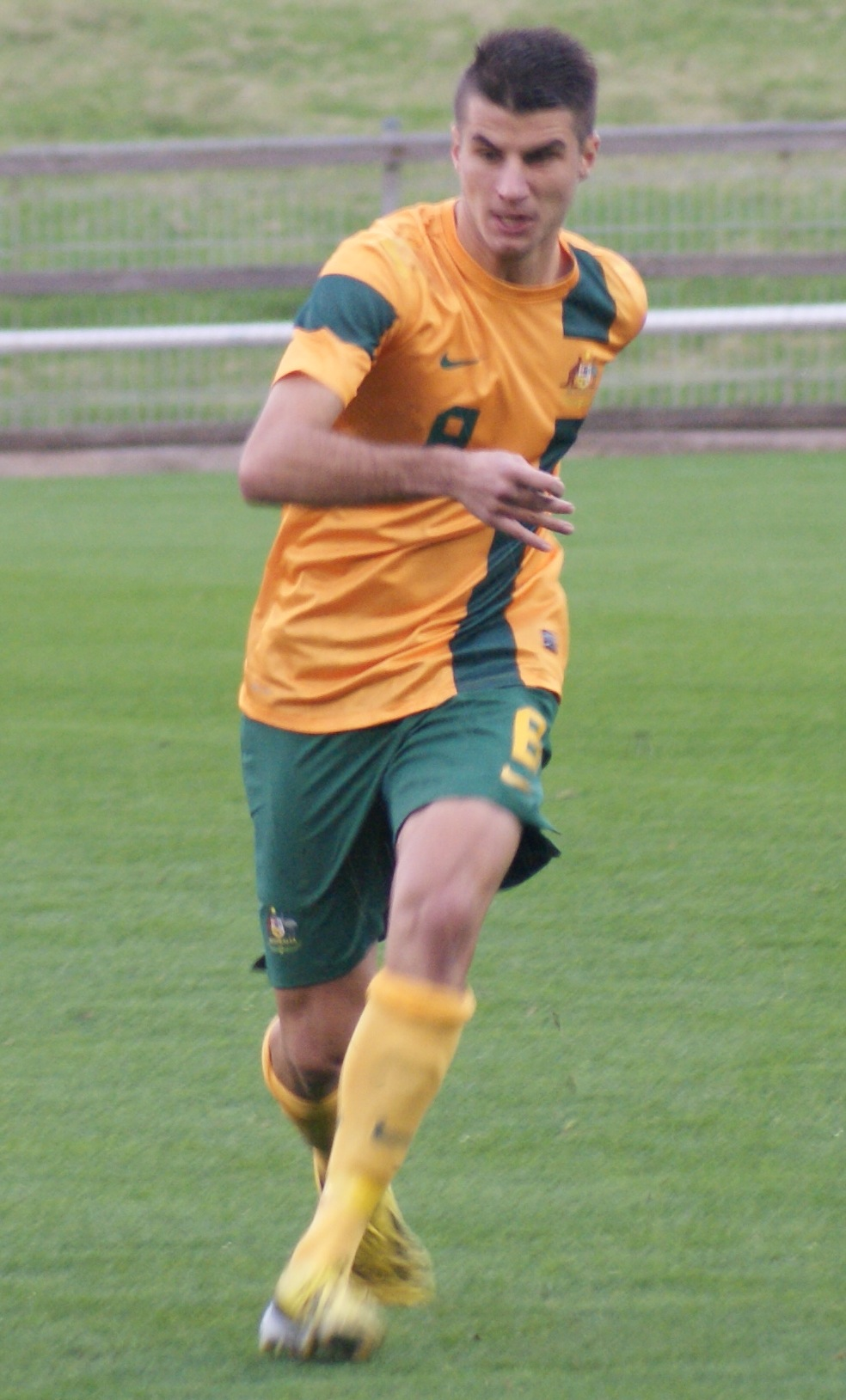
- Antonis playing for Australia U20 in 2013

Personal information
- Date of birth: 26 November 1993 (age 32)
- Place of birth: Bankstown, Sydney, Australia
- Height: 1.80 m (5 ft 11 in)
- Position: Midfielder

Youth career
- St Christopher’s
- Sydney Olympic
- Marconi Stallions
- 2007–2009: NSWIS
- 2009–2010: AIS

Senior career*
Years	Team	Apps	(Gls)
2010–2015	Sydney FC	69	(5)
2015–2017	PAOK	4	(0)
2016	→ Veria (loan)	1	(0)
2017	→ Western Sydney Wanderers (loan)	11	(1)
2017–2018	VVV-Venlo	0	(0)
2018–2019	Melbourne Victory	40	(5)
2019–2021	Suwon Samsung Bluewings	31	(0)
2021–2023	Western Sydney Wanderers	21	(1)
2023–2024	Melbourne City	22	(5)
2024–2025	Uthai Thani	18	(1)
2026–	St George FC	2	(0)

International career^{‡}
2008–2010	Australia U17	11	(3)
2010–2013	Australia U20	19	(2)
2016	Australia U23	3	(0)
2012–2015	Australia	3	(0)
Medal record
Representing Australia
Men's Association football
AFC Asian Cup
Winner	2015 Australia
AFC U-20 Asian Cup
Runner-up	2010 China
- * Club domestic league appearances and goals as of 14 February 2026 ‡ National team caps and goals as of 20 January 2016

Lefteris "Terry" Antonis (Greek: Λευτέρης "Τέρι" Αντώνης; born 26 November 1993) is an Australian soccer player who plays as a midfielder.

Born in Sydney, Antonis played youth football at the Australian Institute of Sport before making his professional debut for Sydney FC at sixteen years of age.

Antonis has played for Australia on three occasions and was a member of the squad which won the 2015 AFC Asian Cup. He previously represented Australia frequently at youth level, including at the 2011 FIFA U-20 World Cup.

A versatile player, Antonis can play as a box-to-box, holding or attacking midfielder, though he is best deployed in deeper roles, where he can create play with his extensive passing range.

== Early life ==
Antonis was born in the suburb of Bankstown, Sydney, and is of Greek descent. His brother George Antonis is also a professional soccer player.

He first received media attention in Australia at the age of 10 by winning a football talent competition on the Channel 7 television show Today Tonight, which resulted in a trip to Madrid to make a training skills DVD with David Beckham. Frank Farina, former Socceroos coach and judge of the Channel 7 competition said: "His juggling is very good, he pulled out a squash ball and started juggling that and didn't drop it once, he is very impressive." He also obtained a sponsorship from Adidas because of his exceptional juggling skills.

Former Australian international Alex Tobin described him as "one of the most outstanding young players that I have seen" and "of immense talent without a doubt." He has also been touted as natural successor to Tim Cahill and Brett Holman in the Australian national team.

Antonis holds both an Australian and Greek passport.

== Early career ==
Antonis began his football career at St Christopher's Soccer Club in Bankstown before moving to Sydney Olympic and Marconi.

Antonis signed a five-year contract with Everton at just 14 years of age, but his contract was terminated due to FIFA's rule prohibiting the overseas transfers of players under the age of 18.

== Club career ==
=== Sydney FC ===
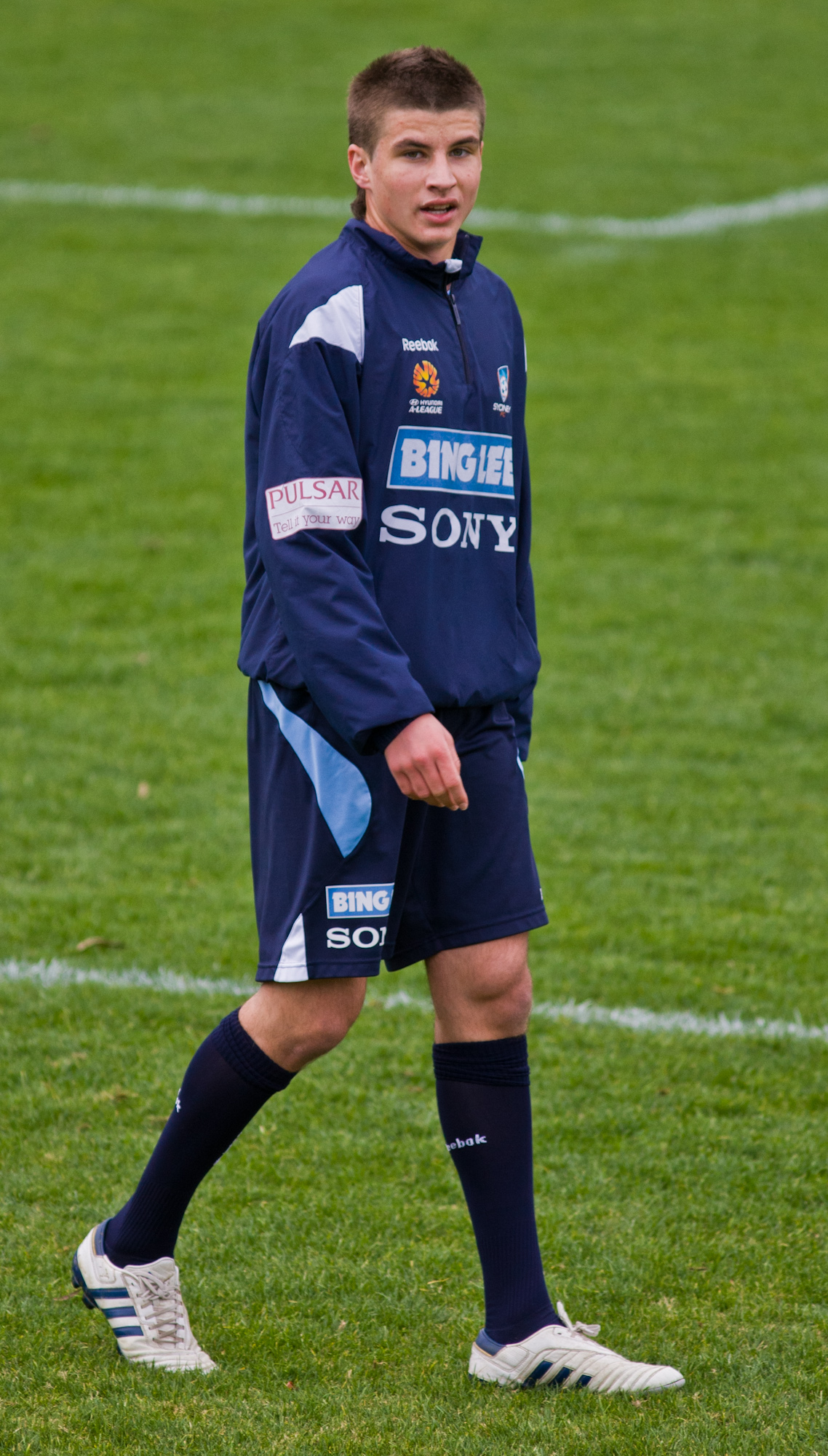
Antonis with Sydney FC in 2010

On 22 June 2010, Antonis made his debut for Sydney in a friendly game against Macarthur Rams at Campbelltown Stadium. On 5 July 2010, Sydney signed him to a three-year contract.

Antonis made his competitive debut for Sydney FC in a 2–1 loss to Wellington Phoenix on 11 September 2010. Antonis scored his first goal for Sydney FC on 16 February 2013 against Adelaide United.

After rupturing a muscle in his thigh, Antonis was out for 9 months, which thwarted his move overseas. In February 2014, he scored against Perth Glory in his first game since returning from injury.

=== Speculation and trials ===
After signing with Sydney FC, he was linked with possible moves to Everton, Inter Milan and Marseille. Much of the speculation was based on his close personal ties with Everton and Socceroo star Tim Cahill, further sparked by a 25-minute cameo in a friendly match for Sydney FC against Everton at ANZ Stadium on 10 July 2010. In February 2012, Antonis reiterated his commitment to Sydney FC and the remainder of his three-year contract, stating that he was more than happy being at the club.

In April 2012, Antonis travelled to Germany to trial with Bundesliga club Borussia Mönchengladbach as a potential replacement for Roman Neustadter. but was not signed.

At the conclusion of the 2012–13 season, Antonis was approached by Dutch club FC Utrecht for a trial, but signed a four-year deal with Italian Serie A club Parma instead after Parma triggered a release clause in his contract with Sydney. However, the deal never went through and Antonis returned to Sydney FC.

=== PAOK ===
The 21-year-old returned to Sydney from preseason camp on the Gold Coast with News Corp reporting a $500,000 bid for the midfielder from PAOK FC.

Greek sources stated that Antonis spoke at length with former Danish international and Technical Director of PAOK Frank Arnesen on the prospects of completing the move to his ancestral country and the planning of PAOK's title aspirations that season.

Antonis made his debut for PAOK in the Greek Cup match away to Chania on 3 December 2015, coming on as a 64th-minute substitute for Eyal Golasa. He made his Greek Super League debut on 21 February 2016 away to Panathinaikos as an 84th-minute replacement for Giannis Mystakidis.

==== Loan to Veria ====
After failing to break into the starting team at PAOK, Antonis moved to Greek Super League outfit Veria FC, coached by Georgios Georgiadis, a former PAOK favourite as a player. Antonis signed a one-year loan deal with Veria on 31 August 2016. He made his first appearance on 16 October 2016 as an 88th-minute substitute for Sisinio González Martínez in an away match at Atromitos.

==== Loan to Western Sydney Wanderers ====
As at PAOK, he struggled to break into a starting position, and was returned to PAOK only to be immediately loaned to Western Sydney Wanderers FC for the remainder of the 2016–17 A-League season. He made his debut for the Wanderers in an away match against the Brisbane Roar on 28 January 2017 as a 77th minute substitute for Mitch Nichols.

=== VVV-Venlo ===
After his short-lived loan spell with the Wanderers, PAOK made it clear to Antonis that he wasn't in their plans. On 8 July 2017, it was announced that Antonis had signed with Dutch Eredivisie side VVV-Venlo on a two-year deal.

=== Melbourne Victory ===
Released by VVV-Venlo on 3 January 2018 without having made a single league appearance for the club, Antonis then signed a 2.5-year contract with Melbourne Victory of the A-League where he made 40 appearances before moving on yet again, to Suwon Samsung Bluewings of the K-League.

=== Return to Western Sydney Wanderers ===
On 25 July 2021, Antonis signed a three-year deal with the Western Sydney Wanderers. His first season he often alternated between starting and coming off the bench. Following the replacement of coach Carl Robinson with Marko Rudan, Antonis was frozen out by club leadership in an effort to force him to agree to leave the club which would free up salary cap room and his squad position.

On 24 May 2023, it was announced that his contract with Western Sydney Wanderers had been terminated effective immediately.

=== Melbourne City ===
Antonis joined Melbourne City ahead of the 2023–24 A-League season. He became the first player to play professionally for all four Melbourne and Sydney derby teams, beating Josh Brillante by a matter of days

== International career ==
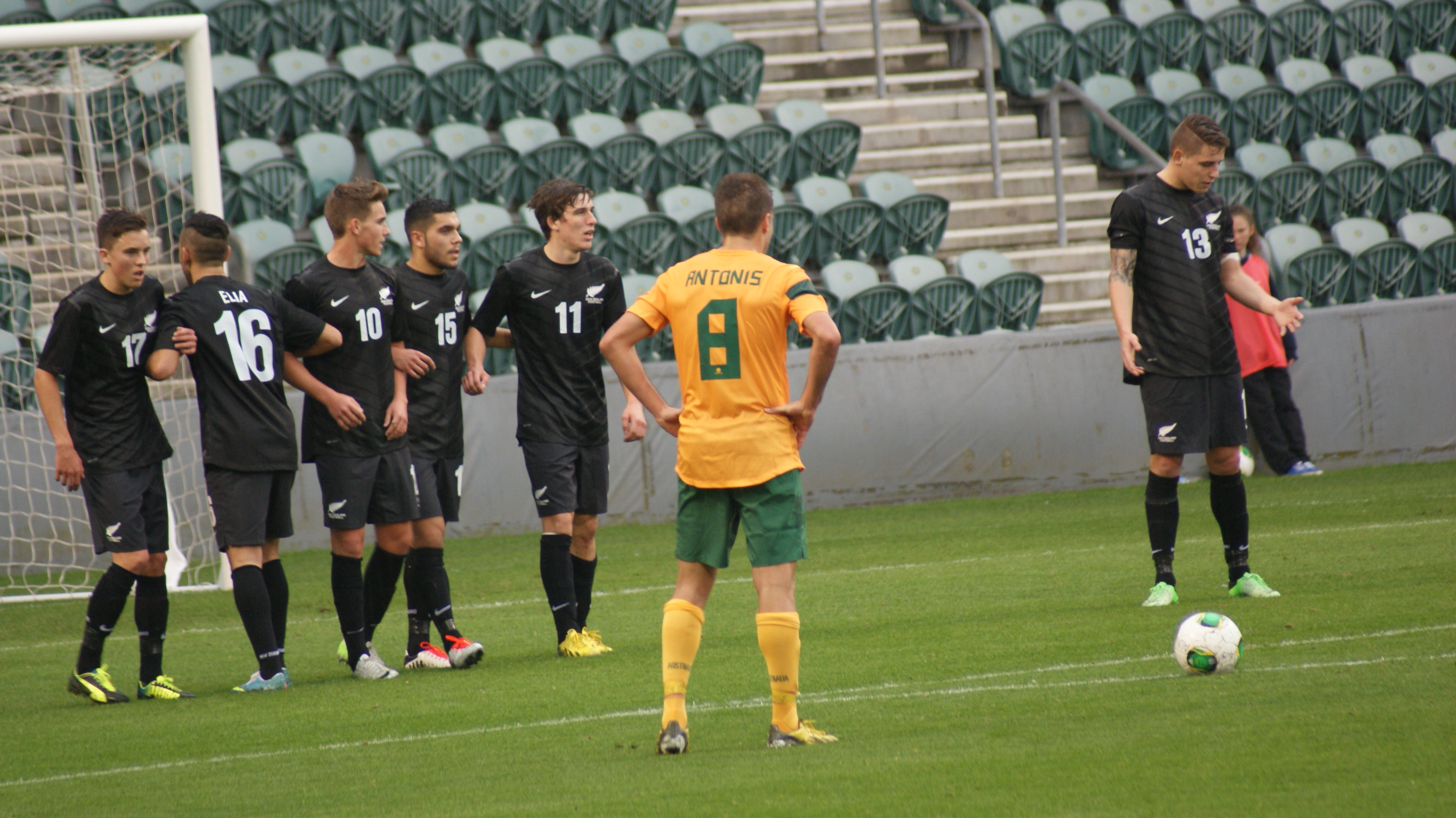
Terry Antonis playing for the Young Socceroos in 2013.

Antonis was part of the final squad for the 2015 AFC Asian Cup but he did not get any actual game time during the tournament. On 23 December 2015, Antonis was included to Australia U-23 national team manager's Aurelio Vidmar selections for Olympic Games 2016 qualifiers, which took place in Doha.

== Career statistics ==
As of 26 March 2023

Appearances and goals by club, season and competition
Club	Season	League			Cup		Continental		Total	
Club	Season	Division	Apps	Goals	Apps	Goals	Apps	Goals	Apps	Goals
Sydney FC	2010–11	A-League	5	0	0	0	0	0	5	0
Sydney FC	2011–12	A-League	19	0	0	0	—		19	0
Sydney FC	2012–13	A-League	16	1	0	0	—		16	1
Sydney FC	2013–14	A-League	10	2	0	0	—		10	2
Sydney FC	2014–15	A-League	19	2	3	0	—		22	2
Sydney FC	Total		69	5	3	0	0	0	72	5
PAOK	2015–16	Super League Greece	4	0	2	0	0	0	6	0
Veria (loan)	2016–17	Super League Greece	1	0	0	0	—		1	0
Western Sydney Wanderers (loan)	2016–17	A-League	11	1	0	0	3	2	14	3
VVV-Venlo	2017–18	Eredivisie	0	0	2	1	—		2	1
Melbourne Victory	2017–18	A-League	17	1	0	0	5	0	22	1
Melbourne Victory	2018–19	A-League	26	4	2	0	3	0	31	4
Melbourne Victory	Total!		43	5	2	0	8	0	53	5
Suwon Samsung Bluewings	2019	K League 1	11	0	4	0	—		13	0
Suwon Samsung Bluewings	2020	K League 1	16	0	2	0	2	1	16	1
Suwon Samsung Bluewings	2021	K League 1	4	0	1	0	—		5	0
Suwon Samsung Bluewings	Total		31	0	7	0	2	1	40	1
Western Sydney Wanderers	2021–22	A-League Men	21	1	1	0	—		22	1
Western Sydney Wanderers	2022–23	A-League Men	0	0	0	0	—		0	0
Western Sydney Wanderers	Total		21	1	1	0	0	0	22	1
Melbourne City	2023–24	A-League Men	22	5	4	0	2	0	28	5
Uthai Thani	2024–25	Thai League 1	1	0	0	0	0	0	1	0
Career total			203	17	21	1	15	3	239	21

== Honours ==
Melbourne Victory

- A-League Championship: 2017–18

Suwon Samsung Bluewings

- Korean FA Cup: 2019

Australia

- AFC Asian Cup: 2015

Australia U-20

- AFC U-20 Asian Cup: runner-up 2010
