= Cameron McGilp =

Australian association football player

Personal information
- Full name: Cameron Robert McGilp
- Date of birth: 8 February 1998 (age 28)
- Place of birth: Glasgow, Scotland
- Height: 1.90 m (6 ft 3 in)
- Position: Midfielder

Team information
- Current team: Preston Lions

Youth career
- 2014–2015: Melbourne Victory

Senior career*
Years	Team	Apps	(Gls)
2015–2018	Melbourne Victory NPL	50	(2)
2017–2018	Melbourne Victory	1	(0)
2018–2019	Birmingham City	0	(0)
2019–2020	Swindon Town	3	(0)
2019	→ Hungerford Town (loan)	4	(0)
2020	→ Hungerford Town (loan)	1	(0)
2020–2021	Slough Town	8	(1)
2021	Gloucester City	6	(0)
2022	Dandenong Thunder	17	(2)
2023–2024	Oakleigh Cannons	47	(2)
2025–	Preston Lions	0	(0)
- * Club domestic league appearances and goals as of 7 September 2024

Cameron Robert McGilp (born 8 February 1998) is a Scottish born Australian footballer who plays for National Premier Leagues Victoria side Preston Lions in Australia, where he plays as a midfielder.

== Playing career ==
=== Melbourne Victory ===
On 19 September 2017, McGilp signed a professional contract with Melbourne Victory.

On 15 May 2018, McGilp was released by Melbourne Victory along with three of his teammates.

=== Swindon Town ===
After a brief spell with Birmingham City, he moved to Swindon Town in January 2019. After his progress was interrupted by injury, he made his English Football League debut as a 72nd-minute substitute in the last match of the season. On 9 October 2020 McGilp left Swindon Town by mutual consent.

=== Hungerford Town (loan) ===
In October 2019, McGilp joined National League South club Hungerford Town on loan.

=== Slough Town (loan) ===
On 10 October 2020, McGilp joined National League South club Slough Town

=== Gloucester City ===
On 12 February 2021, McGilp signed for National League North side Gloucester City.
