= Benjamin Carrigan =

Australian footballer (born 1998)

Personal information
- Full name: Benjamin Carrigan
- Date of birth: 25 July 1998 (age 28)
- Place of birth: Australia
- Height: 6 ft 0 in (1.84 m)
- Position: Defender

Team information
- Current team: Altona East Phoenix
- Number: 4

Youth career
- 2015–2017: Melbourne Victory

Senior career*
Years	Team	Apps	(Gls)
2017–2019	Melbourne Victory NPL	69	(2)
2019–2020	Melbourne Victory	6	(0)
2020–2023	Bentleigh Greens	59	(1)
2024–2025	Melbourne Knights	26	(1)
2026–	Altona East Phoenix	17	(0)
- * Club domestic league appearances and goals as of 14 August 2026 ‡ National team caps and goals as of 8 May 2019

Benjamin Carrigan (born 25 July 1998), is an Australian professional footballer who plays as a defender for Victorian State League club Altona East Phoenix.

== Club career ==
=== Melbourne Victory ===
On 8 May 2019, he made his professional debut against Daegu FC in the 2019 AFC Champions League, starting the game before being replaced by Aaron Anderson in the 85th minute in an eventual 4–0 loss. Following the conclusion of 2019–20 A-League season, Carrigan was released from the club.

=== Bentleigh Greens SC ===
On 9 December 2020, Benjamin Carrigan join Bentleigh Greens for the NPL Victoria 2021 season.
