= Jack Palazzolo =

Australian soccer player

Personal information
- Full name: Jack Palazzolo
- Date of birth: 29 April 2000 (age 26)
- Place of birth: Australia
- Position: Forward

Youth career
- –2014: Avondale FC
- 2015–2016: Sunshine George Cross
- 2017: Pascoe Vale
- 2018–2020: Melbourne Victory

Senior career*
Years	Team	Apps	(Gls)
2016	Sunshine George Cross	4	(0)
2017	Pascoe Vale	1	(0)
2018–2020	Melbourne Victory NPL	48	(17)
2019–2020	Melbourne Victory	0	(0)
2021–2022	Box Hill United	26	(5)
2023	Mazenod FC	22	(4)
- * Club domestic league appearances and goals as of 19:08, 3 June 2024 (UTC)

Jack Palazzolo (born 29 April 2000), is an Australian footballer who plays as a forward. On 23 April 2019, he made his professional debut against Guangzhou Evergrande in the 2019 AFC Champions League.
