= Brandon Lauton =

Australian soccer player

Personal information
- Full name: Brandon Lauton
- Date of birth: 3 March 2000 (age 26)
- Place of birth: Durban, South Africa
- Height: 1.78 m (5 ft 10 in)
- Positions: Right-back; right wing

Team information
- Current team: Altona Magic
- Number: 8

Youth career
- 2017–2021: Melbourne Victory

Senior career*
Years	Team	Apps	(Gls)
2016	Ballarat Red Devils	2	(0)
2017–2021	Melbourne Victory NPL	63	(5)
2019–2021	Melbourne Victory	24	(0)
2022–2023	Hume City	40	(4)
2023–2025	Preston Lions	51	(5)
2026–	Altona Magic	14	(0)
- * Club domestic league appearances and goals as of 26 June 2026 ‡ National team caps and goals as of 7 August 2019

Brandon Lauton (born 3 March 2000), is a South African-Australian professional soccer player who plays as a midfielder for Altona Magic Soccer Club in NPL Victoria.

== Personal life ==
He moved to Australia at the age of 2. Lauton has two younger brothers, Jordan and Leighton, who are also footballers.

== Career ==
On 7 August 2019, he made his professional debut for Melbourne Victory against Newcastle Jets in the 2019 FFA Cup. During the off-season following the 2020–21 A-League season, Lauton was released by Melbourne Victory and during the pre-season trialled with Western United and Hume City.
