= Birkan Kirdar =

Australian soccer player

Personal information
- Full name: Birkan Kirdar
- Date of birth: 7 February 2002 (age 24)
- Place of birth: Coolaroo, Victoria, Australia
- Height: 1.76 m (5 ft 9 in)
- Position: Attacking midfielder

Team information
- Current team: Dandenong Thunder
- Number: 12

Youth career
- Hume City
- Essendon Royals
- Whittlesea Ranges
- 2017–2018: Melbourne Victory

Senior career*
Years	Team	Apps	(Gls)
2018–2022	Melbourne Victory	30	(0)
2018–2022	Melbourne Victory NPL	34	(7)
2024–	Dandenong Thunder	25	(5)

International career^{‡}
2017–2019	Australia U-17	22	(8)
Medal record
Men's football
Representing Australia
AFF U-16 Youth Championship
Third place	2017 Thailand	U-17 Team
- * Club domestic league appearances and goals as of 18 August 2024 ‡ National team caps and goals as of 1 November 2019

Birkan Kirdar (born 7 February 2002) is an Australian footballer who plays as an attacking midfielder for Dandenong Thunder in the National Premier Leagues Victoria.

== Club career ==
=== Melbourne Victory ===
The youngest player chosen in Melbourne Victory's youth squad for the 2017-18 National Youth League season, Kirdar made his debut for Melbourne Victory Youth at the age of 15, coming on in the 76th minute against Perth Glory Youth.

Kirdar made his first-team debut for Melbourne Victory in an AFC Champions League match against Shanghai SIPG F.C., coming on as an 87th-minute substitute for Pierce Waring in an eventual 2–1 win. At 16 years and 70 days, Kirdar became the Victory's youngest ever debutant.

On 1 June 2018, Kirdar signed his first professional contract with Victory, through till the end of the 2019/20 season. On 29 September 2020, Kirdar re-signed with Victory for the 2020/21 season. In September 2022, he left Melbourne Victory.

== International career ==
Kirdar represented Australia at the 2017 AFF U-15 Championship, the 2018 AFC U-16 Championship qualification and the 2018 AFC U-16 Championship.

== Personal life ==
Kirdar is of Turkish descent, and his grandfather was one of the first founders of Turkish-Australian club Anadoluspor, also known as Hume City FC.

== Honours ==
=== Club ===
Melbourne Victory

- FFA Cup: 2021
