= Dream Big (TV series) =

Network Ten sports docuseries

- Genre: Sports documentary
- Directed by: Christopher Gospel
- Starring: Melbourne Victory Football Club
- No. of seasons: 1
- No. of episodes: 4

Production
- Producers: David Davutovic; Christopher Gospel; Tom Pollock
- Production locations: Melbourne, Australia
- Editors: Christopher Gospel; Thomas Buz; Ben Coonan
- Running time: 45–56 minutes

Original release
- Network: Network Ten; Paramount+; Amazon Prime Video
- Release: 16 December 2022

Dream Big is a Network Ten, Paramount+ and Amazon Prime Video sports docuseries. In the series, Australian A-League Men side Melbourne Victory's progress was charted through their 2021–22 season, seeking for improvements based on their last two seasons.

The series was directed by Christopher Gospel and produced by David Davutovic. Christopher Gospel and Tom Pollock. The four episodes were released on 16 December 2022.

== Background ==
Melbourne Victory are one of the most successful clubs in Australia, being known for winning trophies and a consistency of a vast majority of fans in the stands. Their era under Kevin Muscat; the club's second-most successful head coach, won two further championships which reached a record four A-League Men championships at the time in 2018, along with a premiership and Australia Cup.

Since Muscat left the club, recruitments backfired, multiple head coach changes went ahead and saw a downfall to performances and fans in the stands throughout the next two seasons in 2019–20 and 2020–21; both of which they would finish the league in the bottom two. As a recovery, the club appointed Tony Popovic as head coach for the 2021–22 season and look for a massive rebuild promoted by the phrase "Dream Big".

== Plot ==
Melbourne Victory started their league season with a win away against Western United, furtherly another win back at home against Brisbane Roar to the top of the table in the first two rounds. Their first loss would come at home against Perth Glory in Round 3, but keep satisfactory positions in the finals series spots with a few undefeated matches. Three consecutive losses followed, until then they would go on a record 15-match unbeaten streak towards the end of the regular season at the top of the table, until overtaken in the final matchweek by rivals Melbourne City by one point in the end at second place.

They started their finals series in the two-legged semi-finals against other rivals Western United. Despite Victory finishing the first leg winning 1–0, it all ended by losing 4–1 (4–2 on aggregate) one short of the Grand Final, as the season was over for Melbourne Victory.

== Episodes ==
No.	Title	Featured matches	Original release date
1	"All Change"	Western United 0–1 Melbourne Victory (20 November); Melbourne Victory 3–0 Brisbane Roar (28 November); Adelaide United 1–2 Melbourne Victory (11 December)	16 December 2022
2	"Derbies and Details"	Melbourne City 2–2 Melbourne Victory (18 December); Adelaide United 1–2 Melbourne Victory (FFA Cup Quarter-finals, 5 January); Melbourne Victory 1–1 Adelaide United (8 January); Melbourne Victory 2–2 Sydney FC (25 January); Melbourne Victory 4–1 Wellington Phoenix (FFA Cup Semi-finals, 29 January); Melbourne Victory 2–1 Central Coast Mariners (FFA Cup Final, 5 February)	16 December 2022
3	"We Want More"	Wellington Phoenix 1–0 Melbourne Victory (9 February); Melbourne Victory 1–2 Newcastle Jets (12 February); Western Sydney Wanderers 2–0 Melbourne Victory (16 February); Melbourne Victory 1–0 Central Coast Mariners (19 February); Melbourne Victory 3–1 Macarthur FC (4 March); Central Coast Mariners 1–1 Melbourne Victory (9 March); Vissel Kobe 4–3 (a.e.t.) Melbourne Victory (AFC Champions League play-off round, 15 March); Melbourne City 1–1 Melbourne Victory (19 March); Melbourne Victory 1–1 Western Sydney Wanderers (27 March); Adelaide United 0–1 Melbourne Victory (2 April); Perth Glory 0–1 Melbourne Victory (6 April); Melbourne Victory 3–0 Melbourne City (9 April)	16 December 2022
4	"Enjoy The Challenge"	Melbourne Victory 0–0 Brisbane Roar (12 April); Newcastle Jets 1–2 Melbourne Victory (16 April); Macarthur FC 1–4 Melbourne Victory (22 April); Brisbane Roar 1–1 Melbourne Victory (25 April); Melbourne Victory 3–1 Wellington Phoenix (29 April); Sydney FC 1–4 Melbourne Victory (7 May); Western United 0–1 Melbourne Victory (Semi-finals, 17 May); Melbourne Victory 1–4 Western United (Semi-finals, 22 May)	16 December 2022

== Cast ==
=== Players ===
First-team players

The following first-team players make appearances in the docuseries.

Note: Flags indicate national team as defined under FIFA eligibility rules; some limited exceptions apply. Players may hold more than one non-FIFA nationality.

No.	Pos.	Nation	Player
1	GK	AUS	Matt Acton
2	DF	AUS	Jason Geria
3	DF	AUS	Jason Davidson
4	MF	ESP	Rai Marchán
5	DF	AUS	Matthew Spiranovic
6	MF	AUS	Leigh Broxham (vice-captain)
7	MF	AUS	Chris Ikonomidis
8	MF	AUS	Joshua Brillante (captain)
9	FW	ITA	Francesco Margiotta
10	FW	AUS	Robbie Kruse
11	FW	AUS	Ben Folami
13	MF	AUS	Birkan Kirdar (scholarship)
14	MF	AUS	Jay Barnett

No.	Pos.	Nation	Player
15	DF	AUS	Aaron Anderson (scholarship)
16	DF	AUS	Stefan Nigro
17	DF	AUS	Brendan Hamill
18	FW	AUS	Nicholas D'Agostino
19	MF	AUS	Luka Prso
20	GK	CRO	Ivan Kelava
21	DF	POR	Roderick Miranda (vice-captain)
22	MF	AUS	Jake Brimmer
23	FW	NZL	Marco Rojas
24	FW	AUS	Nishan Velupillay (scholarship)
26	MF	AUS	Lleyton Brooks (scholarship)
34	FW	AUS	Gianluca Iannucci

=== Non-playing staff ===
Note: Age as of 1 July 2021

Technical staff

Position	Nation	Name	Age	Notes
Head Coach	AUS	Tony Popovic	47	Popovic started his playing career at Sydney United from 1989 and 1997, loaned to Canberra FC in 1994. He moved to Japanese club Sanfrecce Hiroshima for five years, then English club Crystal Palace for six years, then Qatari club Al-Arabi SC, before moving back to Australia to play for Sydney FC in his last playing season in 2007–08. Popovic played for all Australia youth sides and has capped the senior team 58 times scoring eight goals. His coaching career went from Sydney FC and Crystal Palace as assistant coach, to head coach of Western Sydney Wanderers winning an A-League premiership and AFC Champions League, then Turkish club Kardemir Karabükspor, Perth Glory, Greek club Xanthi, all before joining Melbourne Victory on 21 April 2021.
Assistant Coach	ITA	Fabrizio Cammarata	45	Cammarata played his career through various Italian clubs and managed youth sides Pescara and Akhmat Grozny, and Albanian clubs Dinamo City and Apolonia Fier. He joined Melbourne Victory as assistant coach on 1 July 2021.
Assistant Coach	AUS	Luciano Trani	54	Triani's managerial career ran through various clubs from Victoria and being assistant coach for Wellington Phoenix, Adelaide United, Brisbane Roar, Melbourne City, Newcastle Jets, and joined assistant coach role at Melbourne Victory on 1 July 2021.
Strength and Conditioning Coach	AUS	Scott Smith		Smith was Strength and Conditioning Coach for Western Sydney Wanderers from 2015 to 2018, Brisbane Roar from 2018 to 2019, and Perth Glory from 2019 to 2020. After joining Greek club Xanthi as Strength and Conditioning Coach, he moved back to Australia at Melbourne Victory being their Strength and Conditioning Coach in June 2021.
Director of Football	AUS	John Didulica		Didulica was Director of Football for Melbourne City from 2009 to 2016. He became Director of Football for Melbourne Victory on 16 June 2021.
Football Operations Manager	AUS	Paul Trimboli	52	Trimboli's playing career started at Sunshine George Cross in 1987, before moving to South Melbourne winning three NSL championships, two premierships, two NSL Cups, five Dockerty Cups and an Oceania Club Championship over 17 seasons. Trimboli was an Australia youth and senior international at 46 caps and 16 goals. He became Football Operations Manager at Melbourne Victory on 25 June 2012.
Player Operations Manager	AUS	Carl Valeri	36	Valeri started his playing career variying through Italian clubs, until signing for Melbourne Victory from 2014 and 2019, and became captain since 2015. He is now Player Operations Manager at the club.
Human Performance Manager	AUS	Justin Crow		Crow became Human Performance Manager with Melbourne Victory on 6 October 2021.
Safety and Risk Manager	AUS	John McLeod		McLeod became Safety and Risk Manager for Melbourne Victory in 2018.
Safety and Risk Manager	AUS	Sam Chmayse		
Football Analyst	AUS	Michael Mantikos		Mantikos became Football Analyst for Melbourne Victory in July 2021.

Management team

Position	Nation	Name	Age	Notes
Chairman	AUS	Anthony Di Pietro	52	Di Petro was appointed to Melbourne Victory as a board director in 2006, before becoming chairman of the club in January 2011.
Managing Director	AUS	Caroline Carnegie		Carnegie was Melbourne Victory's Company Secretary since April 2015 and Director since December 2015. She became managing director for Melbourne Victory in May 2021.
Director	AUS	Mario Biasin	71	Biasin was a Director for Melbourne Victory. During the production of the series, he died in May 2022.

Former players and staff

Nation	Name	Age	Notes
AUS	Archie Thompson	42	Thompson began his senior career with Bathurst '75 in 1995, before moving to NSL clubs Gippsland Falcons, Carlton and Marconi Fairfield. He moved to Belgium to play for Lierse from 2001 to 2005. Since the A-League Men's inception in 2005, he joined Melbourne Victory in a ten-year career scoring the most of 97 goals over 262 appearances, and became a club ambassador in September 2016. Known for scoring 13 goals against American Samoa in Australia's 31–0 match, Thompson scored 28 goals in 54 caps for Australia.
AUS	Ange Postecoglou	55	Postecoglou started his career from youth to senior South Melbourne from 1978 to 1993, and before shortly moving to Western Suburbs in 1994. He capped Australia four times. His managerial career began with South Melbourne, then Australia's under-20 and under-17 teams. He moved to Greece to coach Panachaiki and returned to Australia for Whittlesea Zebras and then Brisbane Roar. Postecoglou would then become Head Coach for Melbourne Victory between 2012 and 2013.
AUS	Gary Cole	65	Cole's senior career ran through Ringwood Wilhelmina, Heidelberg Alexander, Preston Makedonia. Cole became Head of Football Operations for Melbourne Victory from 2004 to 2011.

== Production and release ==
Dream Big was announced on 13 December 2022 as a Melbourne Victory production in jointly with KEEPUP Studios and 10 Play, and all four episodes would release on 16 December 2022.

== See also ==
- List of programs broadcast by Network 10
- Matildas: The World at Our Feet
- United (docuseries)
