= 2021–22 Melbourne Victory FC season =

Melbourne Victory
2021–22 season
- Chairman: Anthony Di Pietro
- Manager: Tony Popovic
- Stadium: AAMI Park
- A-League Men: 2nd
- A-League Men Finals Series: Semi-finals
- FFA Cup: Winners
- AFC Champions League: Qualifying play-off round
- Top goalscorer: League: Nicholas D'Agostino (10); All: Nicholas D'Agostino (12)
- Highest home attendance: 17,754 (9 April 2022 vs. Melbourne City
- Lowest home attendance: 5,022 (23 March 2022 vs. Western United
- Average home league attendance: 9,473

The 2021–22 season was the 17th in the history of Melbourne Victory Football Club. This was Melbourne Victory's 17th season in the A-League Men. In addition to the domestic league, Melbourne Victory also participated in the FFA Cup.

The season was documented in the Network Ten, Paramount+ and Amazon Prime Video series Dream Big.

== Review ==
=== Background ===
Melbourne Victory's 2020–21 campaign had seen their first ever last-place finish in a league season, after they finished 12th forcing the club to play an FFA Cup Round of 32 play-off against ninth-placed Perth Glory. Before their 2021–22 season, Melbourne Victory announced on 19 April 2021 that Tony Popovic would be managing the club for three years.

== Players ==
=== First team squad ===
As of 4 January 2022

Note: Flags indicate national team as defined under FIFA eligibility rules; some limited exceptions apply. Players may hold more than one non-FIFA nationality.

No.	Pos.	Nation	Player
1	GK	AUS	Matt Acton
2	DF	AUS	Jason Geria
3	DF	AUS	Jason Davidson
4	MF	ESP	Rai Marchán
5	DF	AUS	Matthew Spiranovic
6	MF	AUS	Leigh Broxham (vice-captain)
7	MF	AUS	Chris Ikonomidis
8	MF	AUS	Joshua Brillante (captain)
9	FW	ITA	Francesco Margiotta
10	FW	AUS	Robbie Kruse
11	FW	AUS	Ben Folami
13	MF	AUS	Birkan Kirdar (scholarship)
14	MF	AUS	Jay Barnett

No.	Pos.	Nation	Player
15	DF	AUS	Aaron Anderson (scholarship)
16	DF	AUS	Stefan Nigro
17	DF	AUS	Brendan Hamill
18	FW	AUS	Nicholas D'Agostino
19	MF	AUS	Luka Prso
20	GK	CRO	Ivan Kelava
21	DF	POR	Roderick Miranda (vice-captain)
22	MF	AUS	Jake Brimmer
23	FW	NZL	Marco Rojas
24	FW	AUS	Nishan Velupillay (scholarship)
26	MF	AUS	Lleyton Brooks (scholarship)
34	FW	AUS	Gianluca Iannucci
35	DF	AUS	Zaydan Bello (scholarship)

== Transfers ==
=== Transfers in ===
No.	Position	Player	Transferred from	Type/fee	Contract length	Date	Ref
2	DF	Jason Geria	Unattached	Free transfer	1 year	14 July 2021	
8	MF	Joshua Brillante	(Greece) Xanthi	Free transfer	3 years	15 July 2021	
3	DF	Jason Davidson	Unattached	Free transfer	1 year	16 July 2021	
16	DF	Stefan Nigro	Central Coast Mariners	Free transfer	3 years	19 July 2021	
5	DF	Matthew Spiranovic	Unattached	Free transfer	1 year	20 July 2021	
7	MF	Chris Ikonomidis	Perth Glory	Free transfer	3 years	21 July 2021	
17	DF	Brendan Hamill	Western United	Free transfer	2 years	26 July 2021	
4	MF	(Spain) Rai Marchán	(Spain) Andorra	Free transfer	1 year	27 July 2021	
20	GK	(Croatia) Ivan Kelava	(Greece) Xanthi	Free transfer	1 year	30 July 2021	
18	FW	Nicholas D'Agostino	Unattached	Free transfer	3 years	14 August 2021	
21	DF	(Portugal) Roderick Miranda	Unattached	Free transfer	2 years	1 October 2021	
9	FW	(Italy) Francesco Margiotta	Unattached	Free transfer	1 year	20 October 2021	
19	GK	Jerrad Tyson	(Australia) Green Gully	Injury replacement	2 months	4 November 2021	
19	MF	Luka Prso	Unattached	Free transfer	1.5 years	19 January 2022	

==== From youth squad ====
N	Pos.	Nat.	Name	Age	Notes
26	MF	(Australia)	Lleyton Brooks	20	1 year scholarship contract
24	FW	(Australia)	Nishan Velupillay	20	2 year scholarship contract
35	DF	(Australia)	Zaydan Bello	19	2 year scholarship contract

=== Transfers out ===
No.	Position	Player	Transferred to	Type/fee	Date	Ref
20	GK	(New Zealand) Max Crocombe	Unattached	End of contract	11 June 2021	
2	DF	(New Zealand) Storm Roux	Unattached	End of contract	11 June 2021	
3	DF	(Ivory Coast) Adama Traoré	Unattached	End of contract	11 June 2021	
4	DF	Nick Ansell	Unattached	End of contract	11 June 2021	
19	DF	Dylan Ryan	(Netherlands) Willem II	End of loan	30 June 2021	
7	FW	(England) Callum McManaman	(England) Tranmere Rovers	Mutual contract termination	9 July 2021	
9	FW	(Benin) Rudy Gestede	Unattached	End of contract	9 July 2021	
8	MF	(England) Jacob Butterfield	Unattached	End of contract	15 July 2021	
17	FW	(Burundi) Elvis Kamsoba	Sydney FC	End of contract	22 July 2021	
16	DF	Brandon Lauton	Unattached	End of contract	11 September 2021	
44	DF	(North Macedonia) Matthew Bozinovski	Wellington Phoenix	Loan	13 October 2021	
19	GK	Jerrad Tyson	Unattached	End of contract	4 January 2022	

=== Contract extensions ===
No.	Name	Position	Duration	Date	Notes
13	Birkan Kirdar	Midfielder	2 years	18 June 2021	scholarship contract
11	Ben Folami	Striker	2 years	12 July 2021	permanent contract following loan
6	Leigh Broxham	Midfielder	1 year	13 July 2021	
15	Aaron Anderson	Centre-back	1 year	19 July 2021	scholarship contract
10	Robbie Kruse	Striker	1 year	21 July 2021	
44	(North Macedonia) Matthew Bozinovski	Defender	2 years	13 October 2021	
22	Jake Brimmer	Midfielder		28 October 2021	
22	Jake Brimmer	Midfielder	2.5 years	19 January 2022	
14	Jay Barnett	Defensive midfielder	1 year	1 February 2022	
26	Lleyton Brooks	Winger	1 year	1 February 2022	

== Competitions ==
Win Draw Loss Cancelled or postponed

=== Pre-season and friendlies ===
4 August 2021 Friendly	Box Hill United (Victoria (state))	0–2	Melbourne Victory	Box Hill
19:00 AEST		Report	Lawrie-Lattanzio 24'; Velupillay 34'	Stadium: Wembley Park; Attendance: 0 (behind closed doors)

30 October 2021 Friendly	Hume City (Victoria (state))	1–3	Melbourne Victory	Melbourne
16:00 AEDT	?	Report	Brimmer; Velupillay; Kruse	Stadium: AAMI Park; Attendance: 0 (behind closed doors)

3 November 2021 Friendly	Port Melbourne (Victoria (state))	0–5	Melbourne Victory	Port Melbourne
19:00		Report	Folami (?); D'Agostino (?); Velupillay (?); ? (?)	Stadium: SS Anderson Reserve; Attendance: 0 (behind closed doors)

6 November 2021 Friendly	North Geelong Warriors (Victoria (state))	0–10	Melbourne Victory	Geelong
20:00		Report		Stadium: GMHBA Stadium; Attendance: 0 (behind closed doors)

13 November 2021 Friendly	Avondale (Victoria (state))	2–2	Melbourne Victory	Melbourne
19:30		Report	Brillante (?); Velupillay (?)	Stadium: AAMI Park; Attendance: 0 (behind closed doors)

=== Overview ===
Competition	First match	Last match	Starting round	Record							
Competition	First match	Last match	Starting round	Pld	W	D	L	GF	GA	GD	Win %
A-League	20 Nov 2021	TBD	Matchday 1	26	13	9	4	42	25	+17	50.00
A-League Men Finals	17 May 2022	A-League Men Finals	Semi-finals	2	1	0	1	2	4	−2	50.00
FFA Cup	24 Nov 2021	5 February 2022	A-League play-off round	6	5	1	0	12	5	+7	83.33
Total				34	19	10	5	56	34	+22	55.88

Last updated: 19 February 2022
Source: Competitions

=== A-League ===
==== League table ====
Pos	Team	Pld	W	D	L	GF	GA	GD	Pts	Qualification
1	Melbourne City	26	14	7	5	55	33	+22	49	Qualification for finals series and 2023–24 AFC Champions League group stage (Note: Determined by which of the Premiers for the 2021–22 or 2022–23 seasons accrued the most combined points over both seasons. Melbourne City qualified as they were Premiers in both seasons.)
2	Melbourne Victory	26	13	9	4	42	25	+17	48	Qualification for finals series (Note: The top two teams enter the finals series at the semi-finals, while the teams ranked third to sixth enter the finals series at the elimination-finals.)
3	Western United (C)	26	13	6	7	40	30	+10	45	Qualification for finals series
4	Adelaide United	26	12	7	7	38	31	+7	43	Qualification for finals series
5	Central Coast Mariners	26	12	6	8	49	35	+14	42	Qualification for finals series

Source: A-Leagues
Rules for classification: 1) Points; 2) Goal difference; 3) Goals scored; 4) Points per game; 5) Least red cards; 6) Least yellow cards; 7) Toss of a coin in an event of a tie of two clubs.
(C) Champions

==== Matches ====
The league fixtures were announced on 23 September 2021.

20 November 2021 1	Western United	0–1	Melbourne Victory	Geelong
19:45 AEDT		Report	Miranda 75'	Stadium: GMHBA Stadium; Attendance: 8,120; Referee: Lachlan Keevers

28 November 2021 2	Melbourne Victory	3–0	Brisbane Roar	Melbourne
16:45 AEDT	Trewin 28' (o.g.); D'Agostino 31'; Folami 50'	Report		Stadium: AAMI Park; Attendance: 13,026; Referee: Alex King

5 December 2021 3	Melbourne Victory	0–3	Perth Glory	Melbourne
18:45 AEDT		Report	Burke-Gilroy 66'; Bramwell 74'; Fornaroli 89'	Stadium: AAMI Park; Attendance: 14,122; Referee: Kurt Ams

11 December 2021 4	Adelaide United	1–2	Melbourne Victory	Adelaide
	Spiranovic 70' (o.g.)		Margiotta 59'; Velupillay 78'	Stadium: Coopers Stadium; Attendance: 8,145; Referee: Adam Kersey

18 December 2021 5	Melbourne City	2–2	Melbourne Victory	Melbourne
19:45 AEDT	Maclaren 60'; Nabbout 63'	Report	Margiotta 12'; D'Agostino 81'	Stadium: AAMI Park; Attendance: 19,640; Referee: Chris Beath

26 December 2021 6	Melbourne Victory	3–1	Western United	Melbourne
19:45 AEDT	Geria 18'; Brillante 19'; D'Agostino 90+4'	Report	Prijović 87'	Stadium: AAMI Park; Attendance: 13,186; Referee: Shaun Evans

8 January 2022 9	Melbourne Victory	1–1	Adelaide United	Melbourne
19:45 AEDT	D'Agostino 84'	Report	Goodwin 90+1'	Stadium: AAMI Park; Attendance: 6,912; Referee: Shaun Evans

25 January 2022 8	Melbourne Victory	2–2	Sydney FC	Melbourne
19:45 AEDT	Folami 17'; Kruse 77'	Report	Ninković 37'; Bobô 81'	Stadium: AAMI Park; Attendance: 10,496; Referee: Alireza Faghani

9 February 2022 12	Wellington Phoenix	1–0	Melbourne Victory	Wollongong
19:05 AEDT	Piscopo 74'	Report		Stadium: WIN Stadium; Attendance: 0 (behind closed doors); Referee: Ben Abraham

12 February 2022 14	Melbourne Victory	1–2	Newcastle Jets	Melbourne
19:45 AEDT	Brimmer 47'	Report	Yuel 57'; Mikeltadze 70' (pen.)	Stadium: AAMI Park; Attendance: 7,181; Referee: Daniel Elder

16 February 2022 10	Western Sydney Wanderers	2–0	Melbourne Victory	Sydney
19:55 AEDT	Russell 55'; Petratos 80' (pen.)	Report		Stadium: CommBank Stadium; Attendance: 4,321; Referee: Alireza Faghani

19 February 2022 15	Melbourne Victory	1–0	Central Coast Mariners	Melbourne
19:45 AEDT	Velupillay 90+4'	Report		Stadium: AAMI Park; Attendance: 8,017; Referee: Adam Kersey

4 March 2022 17	Melbourne Victory	3–1	Macarthur FC	Melbourne
19:45 AEDT	D'Agostino 20', 45+2'; Rojas 58'		Giannou 90'	Stadium: AAMI Park; Attendance: 7,011; Referee: Kurt Ams

9 March 2022 11	Central Coast Mariners	1–1	Melbourne Victory	Gosford
17:05 AEDT	Muller 84'		D'Agostino 38'	Stadium: Central Coast Stadium; Attendance: 2,003; Referee: Stephen Lucas

19 March 2022 18	Melbourne City	1–1	Melbourne Victory	Melbourne
19:45 AEDT	Good 45'		Rojas 19'	Stadium: AAMI Park; Attendance: 18,080; Referee: Alex King

23 March 2022 13	Melbourne Victory	1–1	Western United	Melbourne
19:05 AEDT	Hamill 85'	Report	Topor-Stanley 47'	Stadium: AAMI Park; Attendance: 5,022; Referee: Alireza Faghani

27 March 2022 20	Melbourne Victory	1–1	Western Sydney Wanderers	Melbourne
18:05 AEDT	Davidson 90+1'	Report	Ugarkovic 90+6' (pen.)	Stadium: AAMI Park; Attendance: 6,014; Referee: Shaun Evans

2 April 2022 21	Adelaide United	0–1	Melbourne Victory	Adelaide
19:45 AEST		Report	Rojas 7'	Stadium: Coopers Stadium; Attendance: 8,044; Referee: Alex King

6 April 2022 22	Perth Glory	0–1	Melbourne Victory	Perth
22:05 AWST		Report	Margiotta 57'	Stadium: HBF Park; Attendance: 3,342; Referee: Tim Danaskos

9 April 2022 23	Melbourne Victory	3–0	Melbourne City	Melbourne
19:45 AEST	Brimmer 7' (pen.); Rojas 14', 27'	Report		Stadium: AAMI Park; Attendance: 17,754; Referee: Chris Beath

12 April 2022 7	Melbourne Victory	0–0	Brisbane Roar	Melbourne
19:05 AEST		Report		Stadium: AAMI Park; Attendance: 6,127; Referee: Kurt Ams

16 April 2022 24	Newcastle Jets	1–2	Melbourne Victory	Newcastle
19:45 AEST	Siatravanis 65'	Report	D'Agostino 6'; Margiotta 90+3'	Stadium: McDonald Jones Stadium; Attendance: 5,649; Referee: Jonathon Barreiro

23 April 2022 25	Macarthur FC	1–4	Melbourne Victory	Campbelltown
17:05 AEST	Noone 56' (pen.)	Report	Folami 28'; Brimmer 53' (pen.); Miranda 81'; Brillante 90+4'	Stadium: Campbelltown Stadium; Attendance: 3,188; Referee: Daniel Elder

25 April 2022 16	Brisbane Roar	1–1	Melbourne Victory	Brisbane
14:05 AEST	Parsons 54'	Report	Hamill 68'	Stadium: Moreton Daily Stadium; Attendance: 7,127; Referee: Lachlan Keevers

29 April 2022 26	Melbourne Victory	3–1	Wellington Phoenix	Melbourne
19:45 AEST	D'Agostino 2'; Brimmer 68' (pen.); Rojas 78'	Report	Sandoval 26' (pen.)	Stadium: AAMI Park; Attendance: 8,287; Referee: Shaun Evans

7 May 2022 19	Sydney FC	1–4	Melbourne Victory	Sydney
19:45 AEST	Le Fondre 16'	Report	D'Agostino 14'; Brimmer 30'; Geria 38'; Hamill 87'	Stadium: Netstrata Jubilee Stadium; Attendance: 11,404; Referee: Alex King

==== Finals series ====
17 May 2022 Semi-final 1st leg	Western United	0–1	Melbourne Victory	Melbourne
19:05 AEST		Report	Brimmer 74'	Stadium: AAMI Park; Attendance: 7,295; Referee: Alireza Faghani

21 May 2022 Semi-final 2nd leg	Melbourne Victory	1–4 (2–4 agg.)	Western United	Melbourne
17:15 AEST	Brimmer 37'	Report	Prijović 18', 49'; Wales 78'; Wenzel-Halls 90+9'	Stadium: AAMI Park; Attendance: 15,349; Referee: Alex King

=== FFA Cup ===
==== Preliminary rounds ====
24 November 2021 Play-off	Perth Glory	1–1 (a.e.t.) (3–4 p)	Melbourne Victory	Adelaide
19:30 ACDT	Anasmo 26'	Report	Brooks 1'	Stadium: Marden Sports Complex; Attendance: 430; Referee: Daniel Elder
	Penalties
	Bramwell (penalty scored); Donnell (penalty scored); Coyne (penalty missed); Rawlins (penalty scored); Colli (penalty missed)		(penalty scored) Lawrie-Lattanzio; (penalty scored) Velupillay; (penalty missed) Tyson; (penalty scored) Lethlean; (penalty scored) Leban

==== Final rounds ====
1 December 2021 Round of 32	Adelaide City (South Australia)	0–1	Melbourne Victory	Adelaide
19:30 ACDT		Report	Leban 90+6' (pen.)	Stadium: Marden Sports Complex; Attendance: 1,550; Referee: Daniel Cook

30 December 2021 Round of 16	Gold Coast Knights (Queensland)	1–2 (a.e.t.)	Melbourne Victory	Gold Coast
19:30 AEST	Tipaldo 28'	Report	Lawrie-Lattanzio 53'; Wilson 96'	Stadium: Croatian Sports Centre; Attendance: 2,417; Referee: Chris Beath

5 January 2022 Quarter-final	Adelaide United	1–2	Melbourne Victory	Adelaide
19:15 ACDT	Goodwin 33'	Report	Brillante 62'; Margiotta 79' (pen.)	Stadium: Coopers Stadium; Attendance: 3,156; Referee: Alex King

29 January 2022 Semi-final	Melbourne Victory	4–1	Wellington Phoenix	Geelong
17:35 AEDT	Brillante 65'; D'Agostino 80', 90+1'; Folami 85'	Report	Hooper 39'	Stadium: GMHBA Stadium; Attendance: 2,034; Referee: Daniel Elder

5 February 2022 Final	Melbourne Victory	2–1	Central Coast Mariners	Melbourne
20:00 AEDT	Davidson 70'; Ikonomidis 90+5'	Report	Bozanic 90+7'	Stadium: AAMI Park; Attendance: 15,343; Referee: Shaun Evans

=== AFC Champions League ===
==== Qualifying play-offs ====
8 March 2022 Preliminary round	Melbourne Victory (Australia)	w/o	(Myanmar) Shan United
		Withdrawal

15 March 2022 Play-off round	Vissel Kobe (Japan)	4–3 (a.e.t.)	(Australia) Melbourne Victory	Kobe, Japan
19:00 UTC+9	Iniesta 6'; Osako 80', 87'; Lincoln 95'	Report	D'Agostino 12', 71'; Folami 90'	Stadium: Noevir Stadium Kobe; Attendance: 7,861; Referee: Hanna Hattab (Syria)

== See also ==
- 2021–22 in Australian soccer
- List of Melbourne Victory FC seasons
