= List of Melbourne Victory FC seasons =

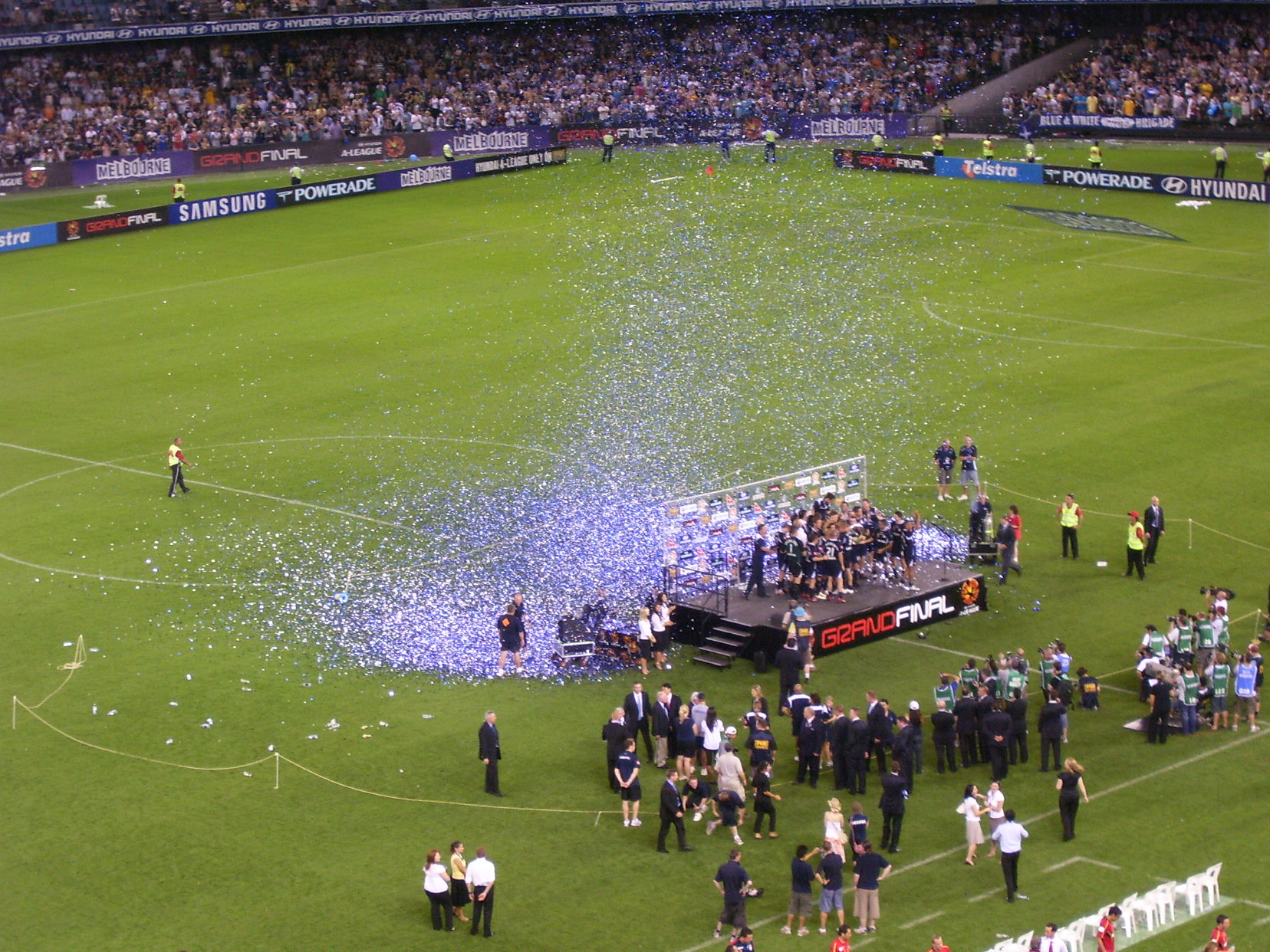
Melbourne Victory celebrating after their 2007 Grand Final victory

Melbourne Victory is an association football club based at the Melbourne Rectangular Stadium. The club was formed in 2004 as the first Victorian member admitted into the A-League in 2005. The club has won the A-League Premiership three times, the A-League Championship twice and has competed in the AFC Champions League on three occasions.

== Key ==
Key to league competitions:

- A-League – Australia's top soccer league, established in 2005

Key to colours and symbols:

| 1st or W | Winners |
| 2nd or RU | Runners-up |
| 3rd | Third |
| ♦ | Top scorer in division (excluding finals) |

Key to league record:

- Season = The year and article of the season
- Pos = Final position
- Pld = Games played
- W = Games won
- D = Games drawn
- L = Games lost
- GF = Goals scored
- GA = Goals against
- Pts = Points

Key to cup record:

- En-dash (–) = Melbourne Victory did not participate/cup not held
- R32 = Round of 32
- R16 = Round of 16
- QF = Quarter-finals
- SF = Semi-finals
- RU = Runners-up
- W = Winners

== Seasons ==
As of 27 April 2026

Results of league and cup competitions by season
| Season | Division | P | W | D | L | F | A | Pts | Pos | Finals | Pre-Season Cup (2005–08) Australia Cup (2014–present) | Competition | Result | Name | Goals |
| Season | League | | | | | | | | | Finals | Pre-Season Cup (2005–08) Australia Cup (2014–present) | Other / Asia | | Top goalscorer | |
|---|---|---|---|---|---|---|---|---|---|---|---|---|---|---|---|
| 2005–06 | A-League | 21 | 7 | 5 | 9 | 26 | 24 | 26 | 7th | DNQ | SF | — | — | Archie Thompson | 8 |
| 2006–07 | A-League | 21 | 14 | 3 | 4 | 41 | 20 | 45 | 1st | W | 5th | — | — | Archie Thompson | 15 |
| 2007–08 | A-League | 21 | 6 | 9 | 6 | 29 | 29 | 27 | 5th | — | 8th | Champions League | Group | Daniel Allsopp | 9 |
| 2008–09 | A-League | 21 | 12 | 2 | 7 | 39 | 27 | 38 | 1st | W | W | — | — | Daniel Allsopp | 13 |
| 2009–10 | A-League | 27 | 14 | 5 | 8 | 47 | 32 | 47 | 2nd | RU | — | Champions League | Group | Archie Thompson | 8 |
| 2010–11 | A-League | 30 | 11 | 10 | 9 | 45 | 39 | 43 | 5th | EF | — | Champions League | Group | Robbie Kruse | 11 |
| 2011–12 | A-League | 27 | 6 | 11 | 10 | 35 | 43 | 29 | 8th | — | — | — | — | Carlos Hernández | 10 |
| 2012–13 | A-League | 27 | 13 | 5 | 9 | 48 | 45 | 44 | 3rd | SF | — | — | — | Marco Rojas | 12 |
| 2013–14 | A-League | 27 | 11 | 8 | 8 | 42 | 43 | 41 | 4th | SF | — | Champions League | Group | James Troisi | 12 |
| 2014–15 | A-League | 27 | 15 | 8 | 4 | 56 | 31 | 53 | 1st | W | QF | — | — | Besart Berisha | 13 |
| 2015–16 | A-League | 27 | 11 | 8 | 8 | 40 | 33 | 41 | 6th | EF | W | Champions League | R16 | Besart Berisha | 17 |
| 2016–17 | A-League | 27 | 15 | 4 | 8 | 49 | 31 | 49 | 2nd | RU | SF | — | — | Besart Berisha | 19 ♦ |
| 2017–18 | A-League | 27 | 12 | 5 | 10 | 43 | 37 | 41 | 4th | W | R16 | Champions League | Group | Besart Berisha | 13 |
| 2018–19 | A-League | 27 | 15 | 5 | 7 | 50 | 32 | 50 | 3rd | SF | R16 | Champions League | Group | Kosta Barbarouses | 17 |
| 2019–20 | A-League | 26 | 6 | 5 | 15 | 33 | 44 | 23 | 10th | — | R32 | Champions League | R16 | Ola Toivonen | 12 |
| 2020–21 | A-League | 26 | 5 | 4 | 17 | 31 | 60 | 19 | 12th | — | — | — | — | Jake Brimmer; Rudy Gestede; Elvis Kamsoba | 5 |
| 2021–22 | A-League Men | 26 | 13 | 9 | 4 | 42 | 25 | 48 | 2nd | SF | W | — | — | Nicholas D'Agostino | 12 |
| 2022–23 | A-League Men | 26 | 8 | 4 | 14 | 29 | 34 | 28 | 11th | — | R32 | — | — | Bruno Fornaroli | 7 |
| 2023–24 | A-League Men | 27 | 10 | 12 | 5 | 43 | 33 | 42 | 3rd | RU | PO | — | — | Bruno Fornaroli | 18 |
| 2024–25 | A-League Men | 26 | 12 | 7 | 7 | 44 | 36 | 43 | 5th | RU | RU | — | — | Nishan Velupillay | 12 |
| 2025–26 | A-League Men | 26 | 11 | 7 | 8 | 44 | 33 | 40 | 4th | EF | R32 | — | — | Nikos Vergos | 7 |
