= Melbourne Victory FC Player of the Season =

Victory Medal
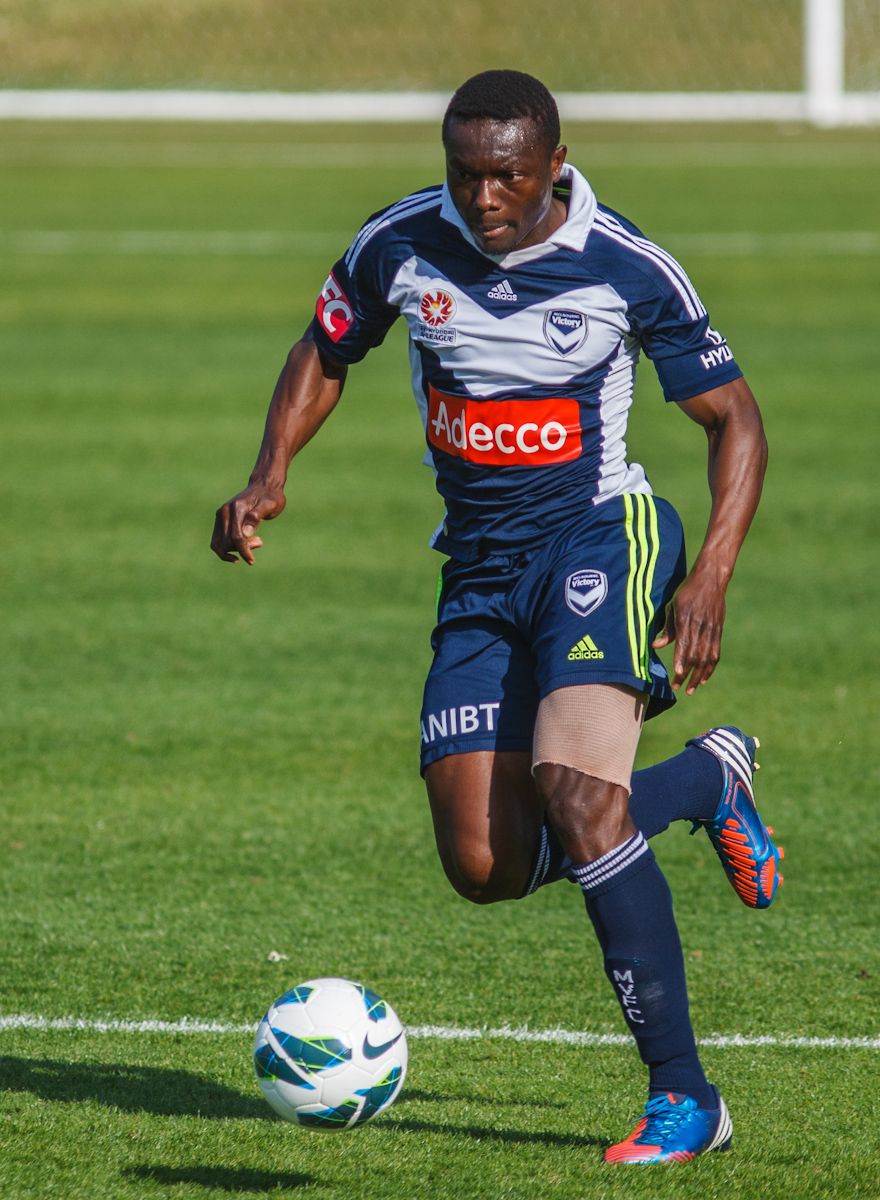
- Adama Traoré won the 2013–14 Victory Medal
- Sport: Association football

History
- First award: 2006
- Editions: 21 (as of 2026)
- First winner: (Australia) Kevin Muscat
- Most wins: (Australia) Kevin Muscat (3 times)
- Most recent: (Spain) Juan Mata

The Melbourne Victory Player of the Season, also known as the Victory Medal, is an award presented to the Melbourne Victory coaching staff's player of the season.

The first winner of the award was Kevin Muscat in 2006, who became the first player to win it twice in 2007. Since then, four other players have won the award more than once: Danny Allsopp (2007 and 2009), Archie Thompson (2008 and 2010), Leigh Broxham (2019 and 2020), and Damien Da Silva (2023 and 2024). Muscat won again in 2009 to become the first player to receive the award thrice.

Voting takes place on a 3-2-1 basis, as allocated by the Melbourne Victory coaching staff.

Other end-of-season awards given by Melbourne Victory include the Players' Player of the Year Award and the Goal of the Season Award. The prizes for all awards are given at an annual awards night, which is held near the end of the league season.

== Winners ==
Players in bold are still playing for Melbourne Victory

Season	Name	Nationality	Position	Notes	Ref.
2005–06	Kevin Muscat	Australia	Defender		
2006–07	Danny Allsopp	Australia	Forward		
2006–07	Kevin Muscat	Australia	Defender	First player to win the award on two occasions	
2007–08	Archie Thompson	Australia	Forward		
2007–08	Rodrigo Vargas	Australia	Defender		
2008–09	Danny Allsopp	Australia	Forward		
2008–09	Kevin Muscat	Australia	Defender	First player to win the award on three occasions	
2009–10	Archie Thompson	Australia	Forward		
2010–11	Grant Brebner	Scotland	Midfielder	First winner from outside Australia	
2011–12	Ante Covic	Australia	Goalkeeper	First goalkeeper to win the award	
2012–13	Mark Milligan	Australia	Midfielder		
2013–14	Adama Traoré	Ivory Coast	Defender	First winner from Africa	
2014–15	Fahid Ben Khalfallah	Tunisia	Forward		
2015–16	Matthieu Delpierre	France	Defender		
2016–17	Carl Valeri	Australia	Midfielder		
2017–18	Leroy George	Netherlands	Midfielder		
2018–19	Leigh Broxham	Australia	Midfielder		
2019–20	Leigh Broxham	Australia	Midfielder		
2020–21	Robbie Kruse	Australia	Midfielder		
2021–22	Jake Brimmer	Australia	Midfielder		
2022–23	Damien Da Silva	France	Defender	The winner who had played the least games for the club.	
2023–24	Damien Da Silva	France	Defender		
2024–25	**Jordi Valadon**	Australia	Midfielder		
2025–26	**Juan Mata**	Spain	Midfielder		

== Statistics ==
=== Players with multiple wins ===
Winner	Total wins	Year(s)
(Australia) Kevin Muscat	3	2006, 2007, 2009
(Australia) Danny Allsopp	2	2007, 2009
(Australia) Archie Thompson	2	2008, 2010
(Australia) Leigh Broxham	2	2019, 2020
(France) Damien Da Silva	2	2023, 2024

=== Wins by playing position ===
Position	Number of wins
Goalkeeper	1
Defender	8
Midfielder	10
Forward	5

=== Wins by nationality ===
Nationality	Number of winners
Australia	16
France	3
Ivory Coast	1
Netherlands	1
Scotland	1
Spain	1
Tunisia	1
