= Damien Da Silva =

French footballer (born 1988)

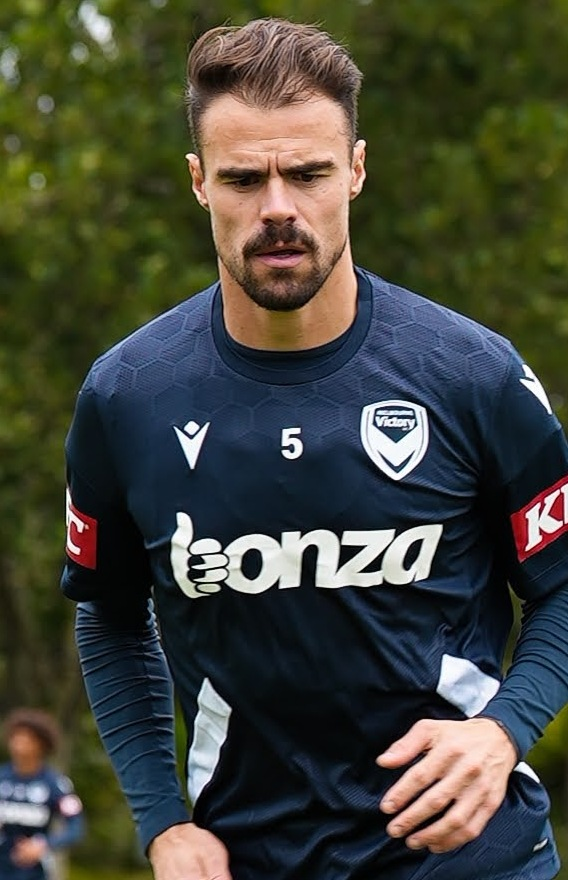

Personal information
- Date of birth: 17 May 1988 (age 38)
- Place of birth: Talence, France
- Height: 1.84 m (6 ft 0 in)
- Position: Defender

Youth career
- 1993–2005: Bordeaux
- 2005–2006: Niort

Senior career*
| Years | Team | Apps | (Gls) |
| 2006–2009 | Niort | 39 | (1) |
| 2009–2011 | Châteauroux | 8 | (1) |
| 2011–2013 | Rouen | 85 | (0) |
| 2013–2014 | Clermont | 33 | (0) |
| 2014–2018 | Caen | 131 | (7) |
| 2018–2021 | Rennes | 88 | (7) |
| 2021–2023 | Lyon | 24 | (0) |
| 2023–2024 | Melbourne Victory | 42 | (5) |
| 2024–2025 | Clermont | 25 | (1) |
| 2025–2026 | Macarthur FC | 21 | (0) |

International career
| 2006 | France U19 | 2 | (1) |
- * Club domestic league appearances and goals as of 24 April 2026

Damien Da Silva (French: [da.mjɛ̃ da sil.va]; born 17 May 1988) is a former French professional footballer who played as a defender.

== Club career ==
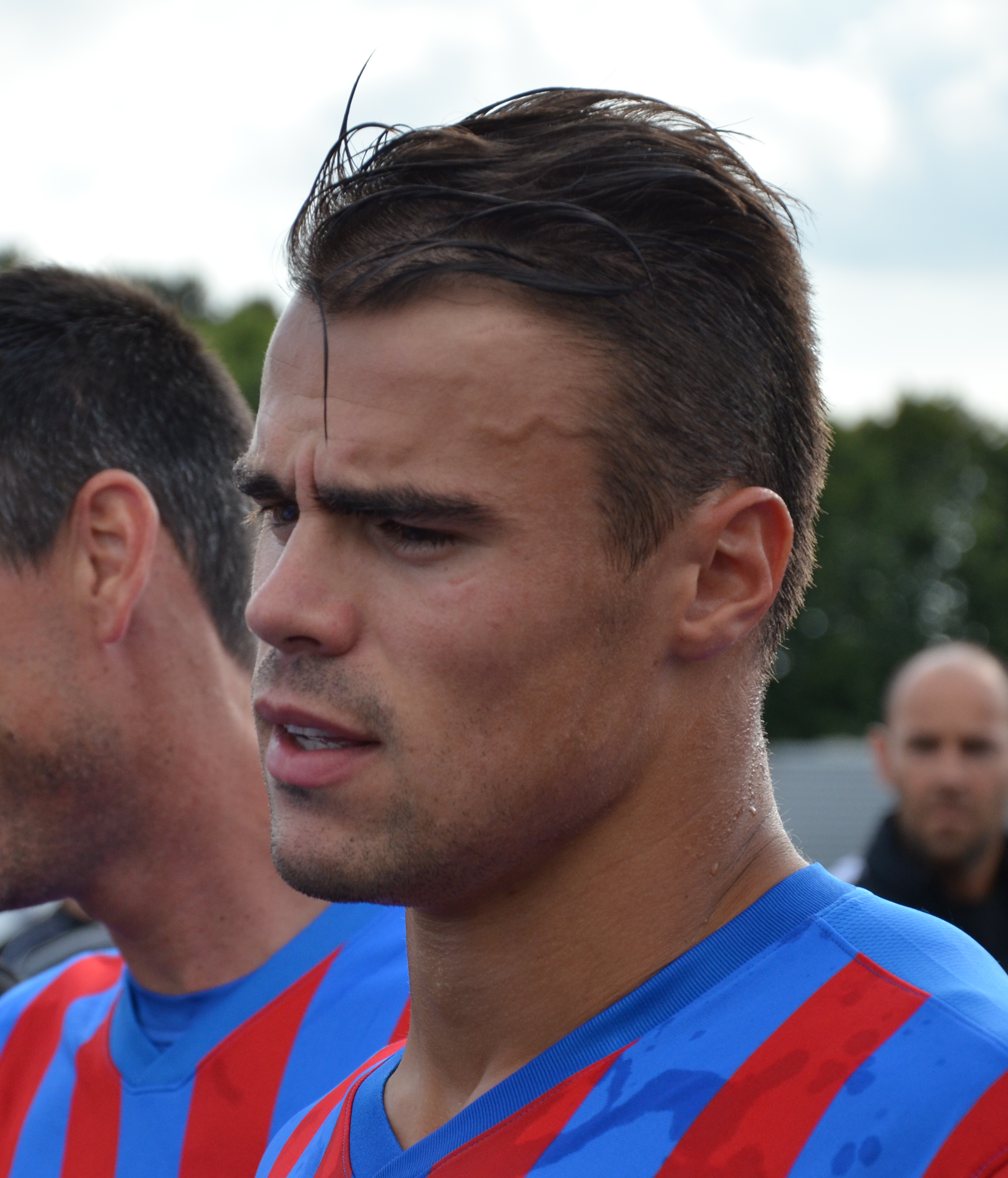
Da Silva in 2014

On 16 July 2009, it was announced that Da Silva had signed a three-year contract with Châteauroux after rejecting a new deal with Chamois Niortais.

On 27 May 2021, Da Silva signed a two-year contract with Lyon, leaving Rennes, where he was captain, on a free transfer.

On 3 February 2023, Lyon stated that Da Silva joined Australian club Melbourne Victory, with the latter confirming that Da Silva had signed for the club until the end of the 2023-24 A-League Men season.

On 20 February 2024, Da Silva scored two goals deep in injury time to secure a 2-1 win over Western United, to put Victory back in finals contention after a 6 game winless streak, with Da Silva's second goal also being Melbourne Victory's 800th A-League goal scored.

Da Silva played his final game of professional football on 24 April 2026 in a 4-0 win for Macarthur FC over Wellington Phoenix.

== International career ==
Da Silva was born in France to a Portuguese father and French mother. In the 2006–07 season, Da Silva was awarded 2 caps for the France under-19 team. He scored a goal on his debut in a 3–0 victory over Finland U-19 on 15 October 2006.

== Career statistics ==
As of match played on 24 April 2026

Appearances and goals by club, season and competition
| Club | Season | League | | | National Cup | | League Cup | | Continental | | Other | | Total | |
| Club | Season | Division | Apps | Goals | Apps | Goals | Apps | Goals | Apps | Goals | Apps | Goals | Apps | Goals |
|---|---|---|---|---|---|---|---|---|---|---|---|---|---|---|
| Niort | 2006–07 | Ligue 2 | 3 | 0 | 3 | 0 | 0 | 0 | — | | — | | 6 | 0 |
| Niort | 2007–08 | Championnat National | 14 | 0 | 3 | 0 | 0 | 0 | — | | — | | 17 | 0 |
| Niort | 2008–09 | Championnat National | 22 | 1 | 2 | 0 | 1 | 0 | — | | — | | 25 | 1 |
| Niort | Total | | 39 | 1 | 8 | 0 | 1 | 0 | 0 | 0 | 0 | 0 | 48 | 1 |
| Châteauroux | 2009–10 | Ligue 2 | 8 | 1 | 0 | 0 | 0 | 0 | — | | — | | 8 | 1 |
| Châteauroux | 2010–11 | Ligue 2 | 0 | 0 | — | | 0 | 0 | — | | — | | 0 | 0 |
| Châteauroux | Total | | 8 | 1 | 0 | 0 | 0 | 0 | 0 | 0 | 0 | 0 | 8 | 1 |
| Rouen | 2010–11 | Championnat National | 21 | 0 | 0 | 0 | — | | — | | — | | 21 | 0 |
| Rouen | 2011–12 | Championnat National | 29 | 0 | 1 | 0 | — | | — | | — | | 30 | 0 |
| Rouen | 2012–13 | Championnat National | 35 | 0 | 3 | 0 | — | | — | | — | | 38 | 0 |
| Rouen | Total | | 85 | 0 | 4 | 0 | 0 | 0 | 0 | 0 | 0 | 0 | 89 | 0 |
| Clermont | 2013–14 | Ligue 2 | 33 | 0 | 1 | 0 | 1 | 0 | — | | — | | 35 | 0 |
| Caen | 2014–15 | Ligue 1 | 35 | 1 | 1 | 0 | 0 | 0 | — | | — | | 36 | 1 |
| Caen | 2015–16 | Ligue 1 | 28 | 2 | 0 | 0 | 1 | 0 | — | | — | | 29 | 2 |
| Caen | 2016–17 | Ligue 1 | 36 | 0 | 0 | 0 | 0 | 0 | — | | — | | 36 | 0 |
| Caen | 2017–18 | Ligue 1 | 32 | 4 | 3 | 0 | 1 | 1 | — | | — | | 36 | 5 |
| Caen | Total | | 131 | 7 | 4 | 0 | 2 | 1 | 0 | 0 | 0 | 0 | 137 | 8 |
| Rennes | 2018–19 | Ligue 1 | 33 | 2 | 4 | 0 | 2 | 1 | 10 | 0 | — | | 49 | 3 |
| Rennes | 2019–20 | Ligue 1 | 25 | 1 | 3 | 0 | 0 | 0 | 3 | 0 | 1 | 0 | 32 | 1 |
| Rennes | 2020–21 | Ligue 1 | 30 | 4 | 1 | 0 | — | | 6 | 0 | — | | 37 | 4 |
| Rennes | Total | | 88 | 7 | 8 | 0 | 2 | 1 | 19 | 0 | 1 | 0 | 118 | 8 |
| Lyon | 2021–22 | Ligue 1 | 17 | 0 | — | | — | | 4 | 0 | — | | 21 | 0 |
| Lyon | 2022–23 | Ligue 1 | 7 | 0 | 1 | 0 | — | | — | | — | | 8 | 0 |
| Lyon | Total | | 24 | 0 | 1 | 0 | 0 | 0 | 4 | 0 | 0 | 0 | 29 | 0 |
| Melbourne Victory | 2022–23 | A-League Men | 12 | 2 | 0 | 0 | — | | — | | — | | 12 | 2 |
| Melbourne Victory | 2023–24 | A-League Men | 30 | 3 | 0 | 0 | — | | — | | — | | 30 | 3 |
| Melbourne Victory | Total | | 42 | 5 | 0 | 0 | — | | — | | — | | 42 | 5 |
| Clermont | 2024–25 | Ligue 2 | 25 | 1 | 3 | 0 | — | | — | | — | | 28 | 1 |
| Macarthur FC | 2025–26 | A-League Men | 21 | 0 | 0 | 0 | — | | 5 | 0 | — | | 26 | 0 |
| Career totals | | | 496 | 22 | 29 | 0 | 6 | 2 | 28 | 0 | 1 | 0 | 560 | 24 |

== Honours ==
Stade Rennais

- Coupe de France: 2018–19

Individual

- Melbourne Victory FC Player of the Season: 2022–23, 2023–24
- PFA A-League Team of the Season: 2023–24
