= 2020–21 Melbourne Victory FC season =

Melbourne Victory
2020–21 season
- Chairman: Anthony Di Pietro
- Manager: Grant Brebner (to 17 April 2021); Steve Kean (caretaker) (from 19 April 2021)
- Stadium: AAMI Park; Marvel Stadium
- A-League: 12th
- Top goalscorer: League: Jake Brimmer, Elvis Kamsoba, Rudy Gestede (5); All: Jake Brimmer, Elvis Kamsoba, Rudy Gestede (5)
- Highest home attendance: 11,467 (6 March 2021 vs. Melbourne City
- Lowest home attendance: 3,235 (23 April 2021 vs. Western Sydney Wanderers
- Average home league attendance: 5,823
Home colours	Away colours

The 2020–21 season is Melbourne Victory's 16th season since its establishment in 2004. The club will be participating in the A-League for the 16th time. This season was the last season where the Victory played home matches at Marvel Stadium; from the 2021-22 season onwards, the Victory play all home matches of all competitions exclusively at AAMI Park.

== Players ==
Note: Flags indicate national team as defined under FIFA eligibility rules; some limited exceptions apply. Players may hold more than one non-FIFA nationality.

No.	Pos.	Nation	Player
1	GK	AUS	Matt Acton
2	DF	NZL	Storm Roux
3	DF	CIV	Adama Traoré
4	DF	AUS	Nick Ansell
6	MF	AUS	Leigh Broxham (captain)
7	MF	ENG	Callum McManaman
8	MF	ENG	Jacob Butterfield
9	FW	BEN	Rudy Gestede
10	FW	AUS	Robbie Kruse
11	FW	AUS	Ben Folami (on loan from Ipswich Town)

No.	Pos.	Nation	Player
13	MF	AUS	Birkan Kirdar
14	MF	AUS	Jay Barnett
15	DF	AUS	Aaron Anderson
16	MF	AUS	Brandon Lauton (Scholarship)
17	MF	BDI	Elvis Kamsoba
19	DF	AUS	Dylan Ryan (on loan from Willem II)
20	GK	NZL	Max Crocombe
22	MF	AUS	Jake Brimmer
23	MF	NZL	Marco Rojas
34	FW	AUS	Gianluca Iannucci

== Transfers ==
=== Transfers in ===
No.	Position	Player	Transferred from	Type/fee	Contract length	Date	Ref
20	GK	(New Zealand) Max Crocombe	Brisbane Roar	Free transfer	1 year	1 October 2020	
22	MF	Jake Brimmer	Unattached	Free transfer	1 year	9 October 2020	
7	MF	(England) Callum McManaman	Unattached	Free transfer	2 years	13 October 2020	
4	DF	Nick Ansell	Unattached	Free transfer	1 year	22 October 2020	
8	MF	(England) Jacob Butterfield	Unattached	Free transfer	1 year	26 October 2020	
11	FW	Ben Folami	(England) Ipswich Town	Loan	1 year	29 October 2020	
19	DF	Dylan Ryan	(Netherlands) Willem II	Loan	1 year	11 November 2020	
34	FW	Gianluca Iannucci	Unattached	Free transfer		18 November 2020	
9	FW	(Benin) Rudy Gestede	Unattached	Free transfer	1 year	25 November 2020	
5	DF	(England) Ryan Shotton	Unattached	Free transfer	1 year	18 December 2020	

=== Transfers out ===
No.	Position	Player	Transferred to	Type/fee	Date	Ref
4	DF	James Donachie	Newcastle Jets	Free transfer	5 June 2020	
18	MF	(Albania) Migjen Basha	Unattached	End of contract	27 August 2020	
7	FW	(South Sudan) Kenny Athiu	Unattached	End of contract	28 August 2020	
19	MF	Benjamin Carrigan	Unattached	End of contract	28 August 2020	
16	MF	Josh Hope	Unattached	End of contract	28 August 2020	
15	MF	Giancarlo Gallifuoco	Unattached	End of contract	28 August 2020	
9	FW	Andrew Nabbout	Perth Glory	Free transfer	1 September 2020	
20	GK	Matthew Sutton	Melbourne City	Free transfer	21 September 2020	
24	MF	Anthony Lesiotis	Unattached	End of contract	21 September 2020	
33	DF	Dalibor Markovic	Western United	Free transfer	12 April 2021	
5	DF	(England) Ryan Shotton	Unattached	Mutual contract termination	20 May 2021	

=== Contract extensions ===
No.	Name	Position	Duration	Date	Notes
1	Matt Acton	Goalkeeper	3 years	24 September 2020	
3	(Ivory Coast) Adama Traoré	Left-back	1 year	25 September 2020	
2	(New Zealand) Storm Roux	Right-back	1 year	26 September 2020	
17	(Burundi) Elvis Kamsoba	Winger	1 year	27 September 2020	
13	Birkan Kirdar	Midfielder	1 year	29 September 2020	
14	Jay Barnett	Midfielder	2 years	29 September 2020	
15	Aaron Anderson	Central defender	1 year	29 September 2020	

== Technical staff ==
Position	Name
Head coach	(Scotland) Grant Brebner
Assistant coach	(Scotland) Steve Kean
Goalkeeping Coach	Vacant

== Pre-season and friendlies ==
16 November 2020 Friendly	Melbourne Victory (Australia)	3–3	(Australia) Melbourne City	Melbourne
	Broxham 6'; Brimmer 81'; Kamsoba 99'	Report	Good 38'; Maclaren (?)	Stadium: Marvel Stadium; Attendance: 0 (behind closed doors)
Note: Match was played with 3 x 45-minute halves.

13 January 2021 Friendly	Hume City (Australia)	1–1	(Australia) Melbourne Victory	Melbourne
	Goal	Report	McManaman	Stadium: ABD Stadium; Attendance: 0 (behind closed doors)

19 January 2021 Friendly	Altona Magic (Australia)	0–4	(Australia) Melbourne Victory	Melbourne
		Report	McManaman (?); Gestede (?); Butterfield (?)	Stadium: Paisley Park Soccer Complex; Attendance: 0 (behind closed doors)

== Competitions ==
Win Draw Loss

=== Overview ===
Competition	First match	Last match	Starting round	Final position	Record							
Competition	First match	Last match	Starting round	Final position	Pld	W	D	L	GF	GA	GD	Win %
A-League	2 January 2021	6 June 2021	Matchday 1	12th	26	5	4	17	31	60	−29	19.23
AFC Champions League	24 November 2020	6 December 2020	Group stage	Round of 16	5	1	1	3	5	11	−6	20.00
Total					31	6	5	20	36	71	−35	19.35

Source: Soccerway

=== A-League ===
==== League table ====
Pos	Team	Pld	W	D	L	GF	GA	GD	Pts	Qualification
8	Western Sydney Wanderers	26	9	8	9	45	43	+2	35	
9	Perth Glory	26	9	7	10	44	44	0	34	Qualification for 2021 FFA Cup play-offs (Note: The top 8 teams qualified for the round of 32, while the bottom four teams participated in a playoff round.)
10	Western United	26	8	4	14	30	47	−17	28	Qualification for 2021 FFA Cup play-offs
11	Newcastle Jets	26	5	6	15	24	38	−14	21	Qualification for 2021 FFA Cup play-offs
12	Melbourne Victory	26	5	4	17	31	60	−29	19	Qualification for 2022 AFC Champions League qualifying play-offs and 2021 FFA Cup play-offs (Note: Qualified as the 2021 FFA Cup winners.)

Source: A-Leagues
Rules for classification: 1) Points; 2) Goal difference; 3) Goals scored; 4) Least red cards; 5) Least yellow cards; 6) Toss of a coin in an event of a tie of two clubs.

==== Matches ====
2 January 2021 1	Melbourne Victory	1–3	Brisbane Roar	Melbourne
19:10 AEDT	McManaman 24'	Report	McDonald 16'; Gillesphey 60'; Wenzel-Halls 79'	Stadium: AAMI Park; Attendance: 10,304; Referee: Shaun Evans

23 January 2021 4	Adelaide United	1–0	Melbourne Victory	Adelaide
18:40 ACDT	M. Toure 53'	Report		Stadium: Coopers Stadium; Attendance: 8,133; Referee: Chris Beath

26 January 2021 18	Melbourne Victory	2–1	Perth Glory	Melbourne
19:05 AEDT	Brimmer 86', 90' (pen.)	Report	Fornaroli 62'	Stadium: AAMI Park; Attendance: 7,018; Referee: Shaun Evans

30 January 2021 10	Western United	0–0	Melbourne Victory	Melbourne
17:05 AEDT		Report		Stadium: AAMI Park; Attendance: 7,016; Referee: Adam Kersey

6 February 2021 15	Brisbane Roar	5–2	Melbourne Victory	Kippa-Ring
17:05 AEST	Wenzel-Halls 9'; McDonald 14', 35'; Danzaki 17', 49'	Report	Aldred 19' (o.g.); Brimmer 45'	Stadium: Dolphin Stadium; Attendance: 8,847; Referee: Daniel Elder

10 February 2021 6	Western Sydney Wanderers	2–0	Melbourne Victory	Sydney
19:05 AEDT	Dorrans 72' (pen.); Yeboah 88'	Report		Stadium: Bankwest Stadium; Attendance: 5,376; Referee: Alex King

21 February 2021 9	Melbourne Victory	0–1	Newcastle Jets	Melbourne
16:05 AEDT		Report	Thurgate 72'	Stadium: AAMI Park; Attendance: 5,166; Referee: Kurt Ams

24 February 2021 3	Melbourne Victory	2–0	Wellington Phoenix	Melbourne
17:00 AEDT	Gestede 45+3', 48'	Report		Stadium: AAMI Park; Attendance: 3,424; Referee: Shaun Evans

27 February 2021 13	Melbourne Victory	3–4	Western United	Melbourne
19:10 AEDT	McManaman 21'; Butterfield 62'; Gestede 82'	Report	Sanchez 42', 90'; Berisha 53', 58'	Stadium: Marvel Stadium; Attendance: 7,190; Referee: Ben Abraham

6 March 2021 11	Melbourne Victory	0–6	Melbourne City	Melbourne
19:00 AEDT		Report	Maclaren 34'; Berenguer 52'; Griffiths 56'; Metcalfe 74', 77'; Colakovski 90+3'	Stadium: Marvel Stadium; Attendance: 11,467; Referee: Alireza Faghani

13 March 2021 12	Melbourne Victory	1–3	Adelaide United	Melbourne
19:10 AEDT	Brimmer 28'	Report	Mauk 37', 77'; Yengi 61'	Stadium: Marvel Stadium; Attendance: 5,217; Referee: Chris Beath

24 March 2021 7	Wellington Phoenix	4–1	Melbourne Victory	Wollongong
19:00 AEDT	Hemed 11'; Ball 36'; Dávila 62'; Lewis 68'	Report	Kamsoba 76'	Stadium: Win Stadium; Attendance: 1,184; Referee: Shaun Evans

27 March 2021 2	Central Coast Mariners	1–1	Melbourne Victory	Gosford
19:10 AEDT	Urena 30'	Report	McManaman 20'	Stadium: Central Coast Stadium; Attendance: 5,730; Referee: Alireza Faghani

4 April 2021 5	Melbourne Victory	0–3	Sydney FC	Melbourne
19:05 AEDT		Report	Bobô 42'; Barbarouses 50'; Baumjohann 84' (pen.)	Stadium: AAMI Park; Attendance: 5,347; Referee: Daniel Elder

10 April 2021 20	Newcastle Jets	1–2	Melbourne Victory	Newcastle
15:05 AEST	Stamatelopoulos 18'	Report	Ryan 48'; Brooks 79'	Stadium: McDonald Jones Stadium; Attendance: 3,860; Referee: Adam Fielding

17 April 2021 19	Melbourne City	7–0	Melbourne Victory	Melbourne
19:10 AEST	Nabbout 11'; Maclaren 34' (pen.), 64', 75' (pen.), 84', 85'; Luna 87'	Report		Stadium: AAMI Park; Attendance: 14,031; Referee: Chris Beath

23 April 2021 21	Melbourne Victory	5–4	Western Sydney Wanderers	Melbourne
19:05 AEST	Folami 14', 45+3'; Roux 28'; Ryan 63'; Butterfield 73'	Report	Troisi 31'; Dorrans 76' (pen.); Duke 86'; Müller 88'	Stadium: Marvel Stadium; Attendance: 3,235; Referee: Alireza Faghani

27 April 2021 14	Sydney FC	1–0	Melbourne Victory	Sydney
19:35 AEDT	Bobô 6'	Report		Stadium: Netstrata Jubilee Stadium; Attendance: 4,816; Referee: Daniel Elder

2 May 2021 16	Melbourne Victory	1–1	Central Coast Mariners	Melbourne
16:05 AEST	McManaman 62'	Report	Simon 4'	Stadium: AAMI Park; Attendance: 4,019; Referee: Jonathan Barreiro

6 May 2021 24	Melbourne Victory	1–2	Macarthur FC	Melbourne
19:05 AEST	Kamsoba 23'	Report	Susaeta 31'; Meredith 69'	Stadium: AAMI Park; Attendance: 3,822; Referee: Chris Beath

9 May 2021 8	Perth Glory	2–1	Melbourne Victory	Perth
18:10 AWST	Fornaroli 52'; Ikonomidis 56'	Report	Gestede 79'	Stadium: HBF Park; Attendance: 3,134; Referee: Kurt Ams

14 May 2021 17	Macarthur FC	3–1	Melbourne Victory	Campbelltown
19:05 AEST	Derbyshire 4', 89'; Meredith 39'	Report	Kamsoba 78'	Stadium: Campbelltown Stadium; Attendance: 3,212; Referee: Adam Kersey

19 May 2021 25	Sydney FC	2–0	Melbourne Victory	Sydney
19:05 AEST	Bobô 10'; Barbarouses 83'	Report		Stadium: Jubilee Stadium; Attendance: 4,226; Referee: Alex King

23 May 2021 26	Melbourne Victory	0–1	Adelaide United	Melbourne
18:10 AEST		Report	Goodwin 39'	Stadium: AAMI Park; Attendance: 5,413; Referee: Alireza Faghani

28 May 2021 22	Western United	1–6	Melbourne Victory	Melbourne
19:05 AEST	Diamanti 45+3' (pen.)	Report	Brimmer 12'; Gestede 22'; Kamsoba 33', 50'; Folami 36'; Butterfield 82'	Stadium: AAMI Park; Attendance: 0 (No spectators permitted); Referee: Adam Bavcar

6 June 2021 23	Melbourne Victory	1–1	Melbourne City	Melbourne
16:05 AEST	Brooks 90+5'	Report	Ansell 54' (o.g.)	Stadium: AAMI Park; Attendance: 0 (No spectators permitted); Referee: Shaun Evans

=== AFC Champions League ===
Melbourne Victory were in continuation of their 2020 AFC Champions League campaign from their 2019–20 season.

==== Group stage ====
Pos	Team	Pld	W	D	L	GF	GA	GD	Pts	Qualification
1	(China) Beijing Guoan	6	5	1	0	12	4	+8	16	Advance to knockout stage
2	(Australia) Melbourne Victory	6	2	1	3	6	9	−3	7	Advance to knockout stage
3	(South Korea) FC Seoul	6	2	0	4	10	9	+1	6	
4	(Thailand) Chiangrai United	6	1	2	3	5	11	−6	5	

Source: AFC
Rules for classification: Tiebreakers

24 November 2020	Beijing FC (China)	3–1	(Australia) Melbourne Victory	Doha, Qatar
13:00 UTC+3	Augusto 22'; Alan 34'; Wang 74'	Report	Iannucci 78'	Stadium: Jassim bin Hamad Stadium; Referee: Saoud Al-Athbah (Qatar)

27 November 2020	Melbourne Victory (Australia)	0–2	(China) Beijing FC	Doha, Qatar
13:00 UTC+3		Report	Viera 9'; Y. Zhang 35'	Stadium: Jassim bin Hamad Stadium; Attendance: 0 Referee: Mohd Amirul Izwan Yaacob (Malaysia)

30 November 2020	Chiangrai United (Thailand)	2–2	(Australia) Melbourne Victory	Doha, Qatar
16:00 UTC+3	Sivakorn 47'; Verzura 82'	Report	Brimmer 8' (pen.); Folami 27'	Stadium: Jassim bin Hamad Stadium; Attendance: 0 Referee: Ilgiz Tantashev (Uzbekistan)

3 December 2020	Melbourne Victory (Australia)	2–1	(South Korea) FC Seoul	Doha, Qatar
16:00 UTC+3	Rojas 5'; Brimmer 23' (pen.)	Report	Hwang 64'	Stadium: Education City Stadium; Attendance: 0 Referee: Abdulrahman Al-Jassim (Qatar)

==== Knockout stage ====
6 December 2020 Round of 16	Ulsan Hyundai (South Korea)	3–0	(Australia) Melbourne Victory	Doha, Qatar
17:00 UTC+3	Johnsen 65', 86'; Won 77'	Report		Stadium: Education City Stadium; Attendance: 0 Referee: Turki Al-Khudhayr (Saudi Arabia)

== Statistics ==
=== Appearances and goals ===
Includes all competitions. Players with no appearances not included in the list.

No.	Pos	Nat	Player	Total		A-League		AFC Champions League	
No.	Pos	Nat	Player	Apps	Goals	Apps	Goals	Apps	Goals
1	GK	(Australia) AUS	Matt Acton	18	0	16	0	2	0
2	DF	(New Zealand) NZL	Storm Roux	29	1	24	1	5	0
3	DF	(Ivory Coast) CIV	Adama Traoré	21	0	17	0	4	0
4	DF	(Australia) AUS	Nick Ansell	19	0	14	0	5	0
6	MF	(Australia) AUS	Leigh Broxham	25	0	19+2	0	4	0
7	MF	(England) ENG	Callum McManaman	22	4	18	4	4	0
8	MF	(England) ENG	Jacob Butterfield	30	3	25+1	3	4	0
9	FW	(Benin) BEN	Rudy Gestede	18	5	15+3	5	0	0
10	FW	(Australia) AUS	Robbie Kruse	19	0	16+3	0	0	0
11	FW	(Australia) AUS	Ben Folami	22	4	13+4	3	5	1
13	MF	(Australia) AUS	Birkan Kirdar	16	0	5+8	0	1+2	0
14	MF	(Australia) AUS	Jay Barnett	24	0	7+12	0	1+4	0
15	DF	(Australia) AUS	Aaron Anderson	14	0	6+4	0	2+2	0
17	FW	(Burundi) BDI	Elvis Kamsoba	23	5	10+10	5	1+2	0
19	DF	(Australia) AUS	Dylan Ryan	23	2	17+2	2	3+1	0
20	GK	(New Zealand) NZL	Max Crocombe	13	0	10	0	3	0
22	MF	(Australia) AUS	Jake Brimmer	30	7	25	5	5	2
23	FW	(New Zealand) NZL	Marco Rojas	12	1	7	0	5	1
25	DF	(Australia) AUS	Brandon Lauton	14	0	4+8	0	0+2	0
26	FW	(Australia) AUS	Lleyton Brooks	9	2	3+6	2	0	0
29	FW	(Australia) AUS	Nishan Velupillay	4	0	0+4	0	0	0
32	DF	(Japan) JPN	So Nishikawa	2	0	0	0	1+1	0
34	MF	(Australia) AUS	Gianluca Iannucci	3	1	0+1	0	0+2	1
35	DF	(Australia) AUS	Zayden Bello	4	0	0+4	0	0	0
43	FW	(Australia) AUS	Luis Lawrie-Lattanzio	17	0	5+7	0	0+5	0
Player(s) transferred out but featured this season
5	DF	(England) ENG	Ryan Shotton	8	0	7+1	0	0	0
33	DF	(Australia) AUS	Dalibor Markovic	4	0	3+1	0	0	0

- Source: Soccerway

=== Disciplinary record ===
Includes all competitions. The list is sorted by squad number when total cards are equal. Players with no cards not included in the list.

No.	Pos	Nat	Player	Total			A-League			AFC Champions League		
No.	Pos	Nat	Player	Yellow card	Second yellow card	Red card	Yellow card	Second yellow card	Red card	Yellow card	Second yellow card	Red card
3	DF	(Ivory Coast) CIV	Adama Traoré	6	0	1	5	0	1	1	0	0
4	DF	(Australia) AUS	Nick Ansell	2	0	1	1	0	1	1	0	0
17	FW	(Burundi) BDI	Elvis Kamsoba	1	1	0	1	1	0	0	0	0
7	MF	(England) ENG	Callum McManaman	7	0	0	6	0	0	1	0	0
10	FW	(Australia) AUS	Robbie Kruse	7	0	0	7	0	0	0	0	0
22	MF	(Australia) AUS	Jake Brimmer	7	0	0	6	0	0	1	0	0
2	DF	(New Zealand) NZL	Storm Roux	6	0	0	6	0	0	0	0	0
6	MF	(Australia) AUS	Leigh Broxham	6	0	0	5	0	0	1	0	0
8	MF	(England) ENG	Jacob Butterfield	5	0	0	3	0	0	2	0	0
15	DF	(Australia) AUS	Aaron Anderson	5	0	0	3	0	0	2	0	0
5	DF	(England) ENG	Ryan Shotton	4	0	0	4	0	0	0	0	0
19	DF	(Australia) AUS	Dylan Ryan	4	0	0	2	0	0	2	0	0
43	FW	(Australia) AUS	Luis Lawrie-Lattanzio	3	0	0	3	0	0	0	0	0
1	GK	(Australia) AUS	Matt Acton	2	0	0	1	0	0	1	0	0
9	FW	(Benin) BEN	Rudy Gestede	2	0	0	2	0	0	0	0	0
11	FW	(Australia) AUS	Ben Folami	2	0	0	2	0	0	0	0	0
13	MF	(Australia) AUS	Birkan Kirdar	2	0	0	2	0	0	0	0	0
14	MF	(Australia) AUS	Jay Barnett	2	0	0	2	0	0	0	0	0
25	DF	(Australia) AUS	Brandon Lauton	1	0	0	1	0	0	0	0	0
33	DF	(Australia) AUS	Dalibor Markovic	1	0	0	1	0	0	0	0	0

- Source: Soccerway
- (yellow card) = Number of bookings; (second yellow card) = Number of sending offs after a second yellow card; (red card) = Number of sending offs by a direct red card.
