= Lleyton Brooks =

Australian soccer player (born 2001)

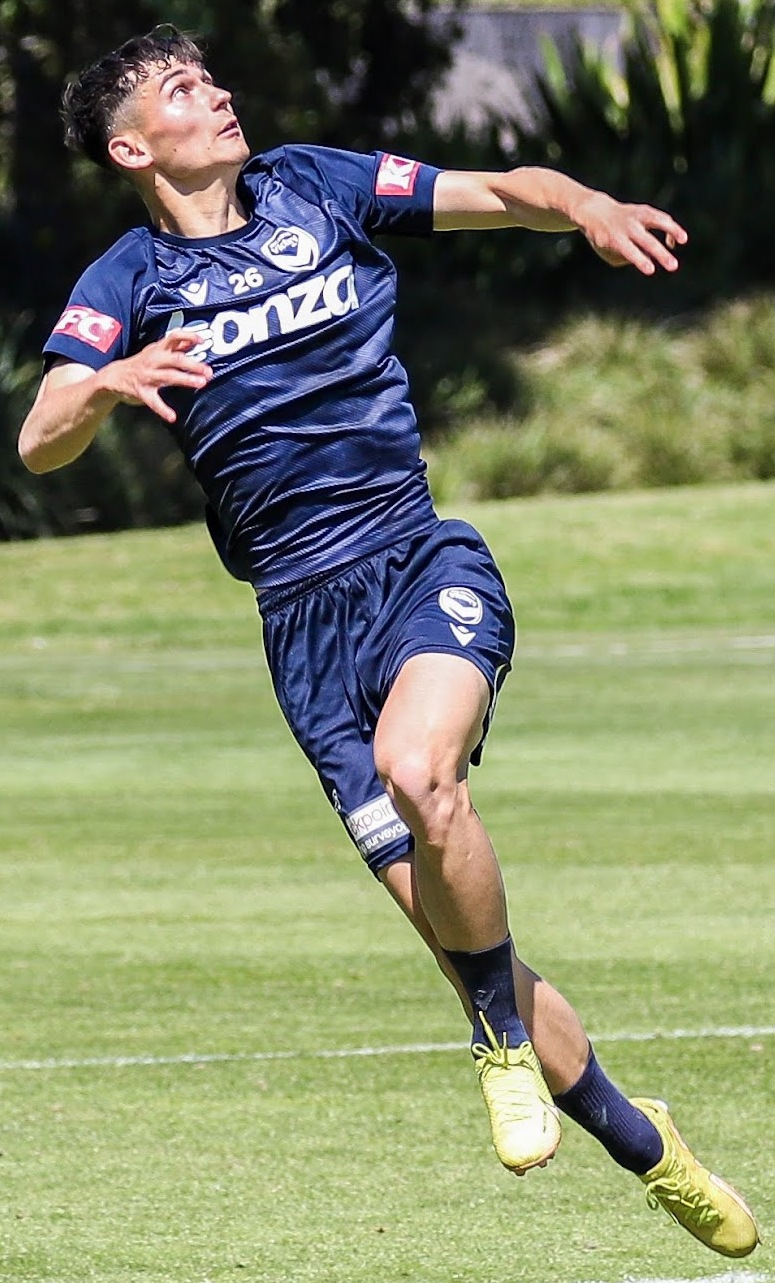
- Brooks in training with Melbourne Victory in November 2022

Personal information
- Full name: Lleyton Andrew Tanabe Brooks
- Date of birth: 20 March 2001 (age 25)
- Place of birth: Benowa, Queensland, Australia
- Height: 1.79 m (5 ft 10 1/2 in)
- Position: Winger

Team information
- Current team: Preston Lions
- Number: 7

Youth career
- 2013–2016: Brisbane Strikers
- 2016–2017: Brisbane Roar
- 2017: FFA Centre of Excellence
- 2018–2019: Brisbane Roar
- 2019: Melbourne Victory

Senior career*
| Years | Team | Apps | (Gls) |
| 2017 | FFA Centre of Excellence | 13 | (5) |
| 2018–2019 | Brisbane Roar NPL | 22 | (1) |
| 2020–2023 | Melbourne Victory | 31 | (3) |
| 2021–2022 | Melbourne Victory NPL | 9 | (4) |
| 2024 | Cavalry FC | 13 | (0) |
| 2025– | Preston Lions | 46 | (14) |

International career^{‡}
| 2019 | Australia U18 | 4 | (2) |
Medal record
Men's football
Representing Australia
AFF U-19 Youth Championship
| First place | 2019 Vietnam | U-20 Team |
- * Club domestic league appearances and goals as of 16 August 2026 ‡ National team caps and goals as of 9 August 2020

Lleyton Andrew Tanabe Brooks (born 21 March 2001) is an Australian professional soccer player who currently played as a winger for National Premier Leagues Victoria club Preston Lions.

== Early life ==
Brooks played youth soccer with the Brisbane Strikers and Brisbane Roar. In 2017, he joined the FFA Centre of Excellence, before later returning to the Brisbane Roar youth. Brooks was part of the 2018–19 Y-League championship-winning Brisbane Roar Youth team.

== Club career ==
In 2017, Brooks played with the FFA Centre of Excellence in the NPL ACT.

In 2018, he began playing with the Brisbane Roar NPL in the NPL Queensland, while also training with the first team.

In October 2019, Brooks joined Melbourne Victory in the A-League. On 8 August 2020, he made his debut, in a substitute appearance, against Perth Glory. On 10 April 2021, he scored his first goal, scoring the winning goal in a 2-1 victory over the Newcastle Jets. On 6 June 2021, he scored a last minute equaliser in injury time against league leaders Melbourne City. In his debut season with the Victory, Brooks made 9 appearances and scored 2 goals; with his performances earning him Melbourne Victory's Young Player of the Season award for the 2020-21 season. Following the season, he re-signed with the club on a new one-year scholarship contract. In February 2022, he signed another extension, through the end of the 2022-23 season. On May 7, 2022, while playing for the second team in the NPL Victoria 3, he scored a hat trick against Ballarat City FC. Brooks scored his third goal for Victory in the 2022–23 A-League Men season on 23 April 2023, sealing the winner in a 2–1 home win over Macarthur FC and helping his side avoid the wooden spoon. He was released at the end of the 2022-23 season.

In December 2023, he joined Canadian Premier League club Cavalry FC on a two-year contract, beginning in the 2024 season. He made his debut for Cavalry on February 27, in a CONCACAF Champions Cup match against Orlando City SC. Brooks contract was terminated by mutual consent in July 2024.

In December 2024, he signed with NPL Victoria club Preston Lions for the 2025 season.

== International career ==
Born in Australia, Brooks is also of Japanese descent.

In July 2019, he was named to the Australia U20 squad for a camp. He was then named to the squad for the Australia U18 team for the 2019 AFF U-18 Youth Championship. On 7 August 2019, he scored two goals against Cambodia U18 in the tournament opener.

== Personal life ==
His father Craig worked as a camera operator for Network 10.

== Career statistics ==
As of July 13, 2024

Club statistics
| Club | Season | League | | | Playoffs | | National Cup | | Continental | | Total | |
| Club | Season | Division | Apps | Goals | Apps | Goals | Apps | Goals | Apps | Goals | Apps | Goals |
|---|---|---|---|---|---|---|---|---|---|---|---|---|
| FFA Centre of Excellence | 2017 | NPL ACT | 13 | 5 | — | | — | | — | | 13 | 5 |
| Brisbane Roar NPL | 2018 | NPL Queensland | 10 | 0 | — | | — | | — | | 10 | 0 |
| Brisbane Roar NPL | 2019 | NPL Queensland | 12 | 1 | — | | — | | — | | 12 | 1 |
| Brisbane Roar NPL | Total | | 22 | 1 | 0 | 0 | 0 | 0 | 0 | 0 | 22 | 1 |
| Melbourne Victory NPL | 2021 | NPL Victoria 3 | 3 | 1 | — | | — | | — | | 3 | 1 |
| Melbourne Victory NPL | 2022 | NPL Victoria 3 | 6 | 3 | 1 | 0 | — | | — | | 7 | 3 |
| Melbourne Victory NPL | Total | | 9 | 4 | 1 | 0 | 0 | 0 | 0 | 0 | 10 | 4 |
| Melbourne Victory FC | 2019–20 | A-League Men | 2 | 0 | 0 | 0 | 0 | 0 | — | | 2 | 0 |
| Melbourne Victory FC | 2020–21 | A-League Men | 9 | 2 | — | | 0 | 0 | — | | 9 | 2 |
| Melbourne Victory FC | 2021–22 | A-League Men | 8 | 0 | 0 | 0 | 4 | 1 | 0 | 0 | 12 | 1 |
| Melbourne Victory FC | 2022–23 | A-League Men | 12 | 1 | — | | 1 | 0 | — | | 13 | 1 |
| Melbourne Victory FC | Total | | 31 | 3 | 0 | 0 | 5 | 1 | 0 | 0 | 36 | 4 |
| Cavalry FC | 2024 | Canadian Premier League | 13 | 0 | 0 | 0 | 3 | 0 | 1 | 0 | 17 | 0 |
| Career total | | | 88 | 13 | 1 | 0 | 8 | 1 | 1 | 0 | 98 | 14 |

== Honours ==
=== Domestic ===
Preston Lions FC

- Dockerty Cup: 2026

=== International ===
Australia U18

- AFF U-18 Youth Championship: 2019
