= Ben Folami =

Australian professional soccer player

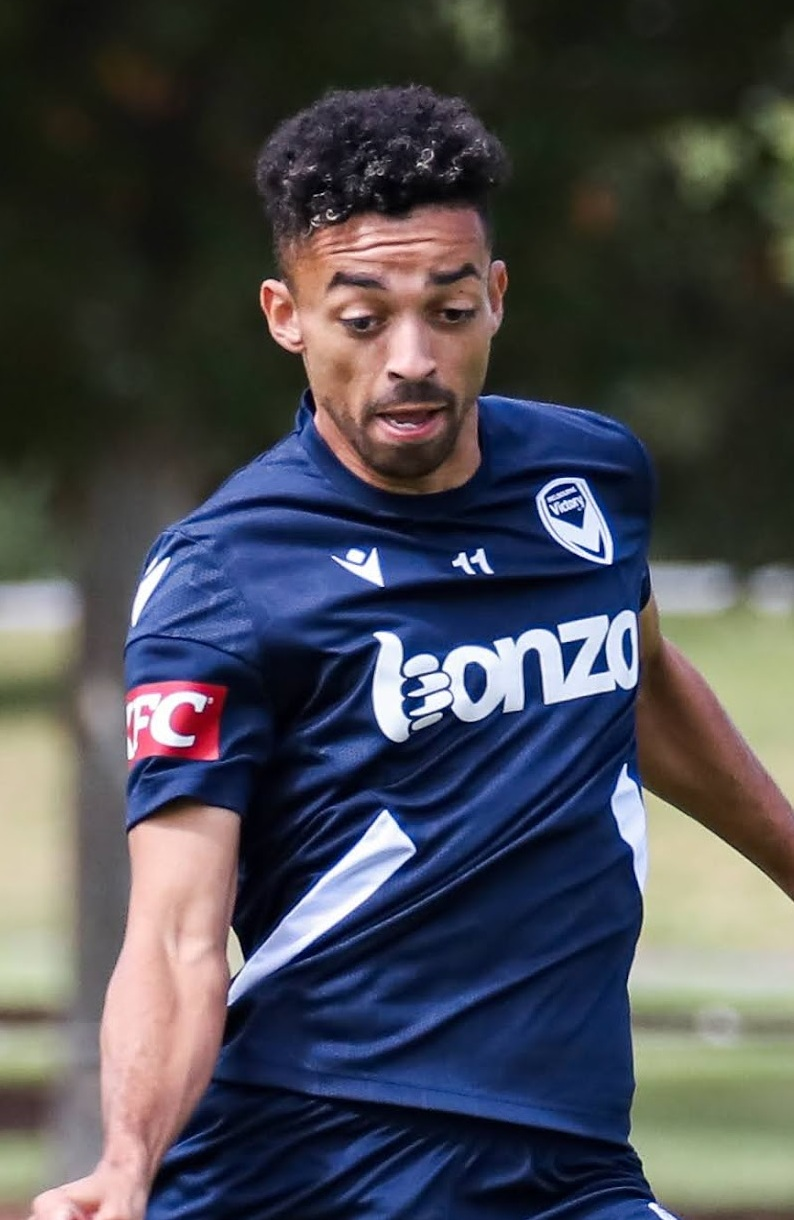
- Folami in 2023

Personal information
- Full name: Gbenga Tai Folami
- Date of birth: 8 June 1999 (age 27)
- Place of birth: Sydney, Australia
- Height: 1.80 m (5 ft 11 in)
- Position: Winger

Team information
- Current team: Adelaide United
- Number: 17

Youth career
- 2012–2014: Football NSW Institute
- 2014–2015: Sutherland Sharks
- 2015–2017: Ipswich Town

Senior career*
Years	Team	Apps	(Gls)
2017–2021	Ipswich Town	4	(0)
2020	→ Stevenage (loan)	2	(0)
2020–2021	→ Melbourne Victory (loan)	17	(3)
2021–2024	Melbourne Victory	82	(6)
2024–	Adelaide United	28	(1)

International career^{‡}
2018–2019	Australia U19	4	(1)
2019–2020	Australia U23	5	(1)
2022	Australia	1	(0)
Medal record
Men's football
Representing Australia
AFC U-23 Asian Cup
Third place	2020 Thailand	U-23 Team
- * Club domestic league appearances and goals as of 11 January 2025 ‡ National team caps and goals as of 25 March 2022 (UTC)

Gbenga Tai "Ben" Folami (Yoruba: [ɡbɛ̀ŋɡa táj fòlámì]; born 8 June 1999) is an Australian professional soccer player who plays as a winger for Adelaide United and the Australia national team.

== Early life ==
Folami was born on 8 June 1999 in Sydney, Australia. He grew up in the city and Sutherland Shire, Australia.

== Club career ==
=== Ipswich Town ===
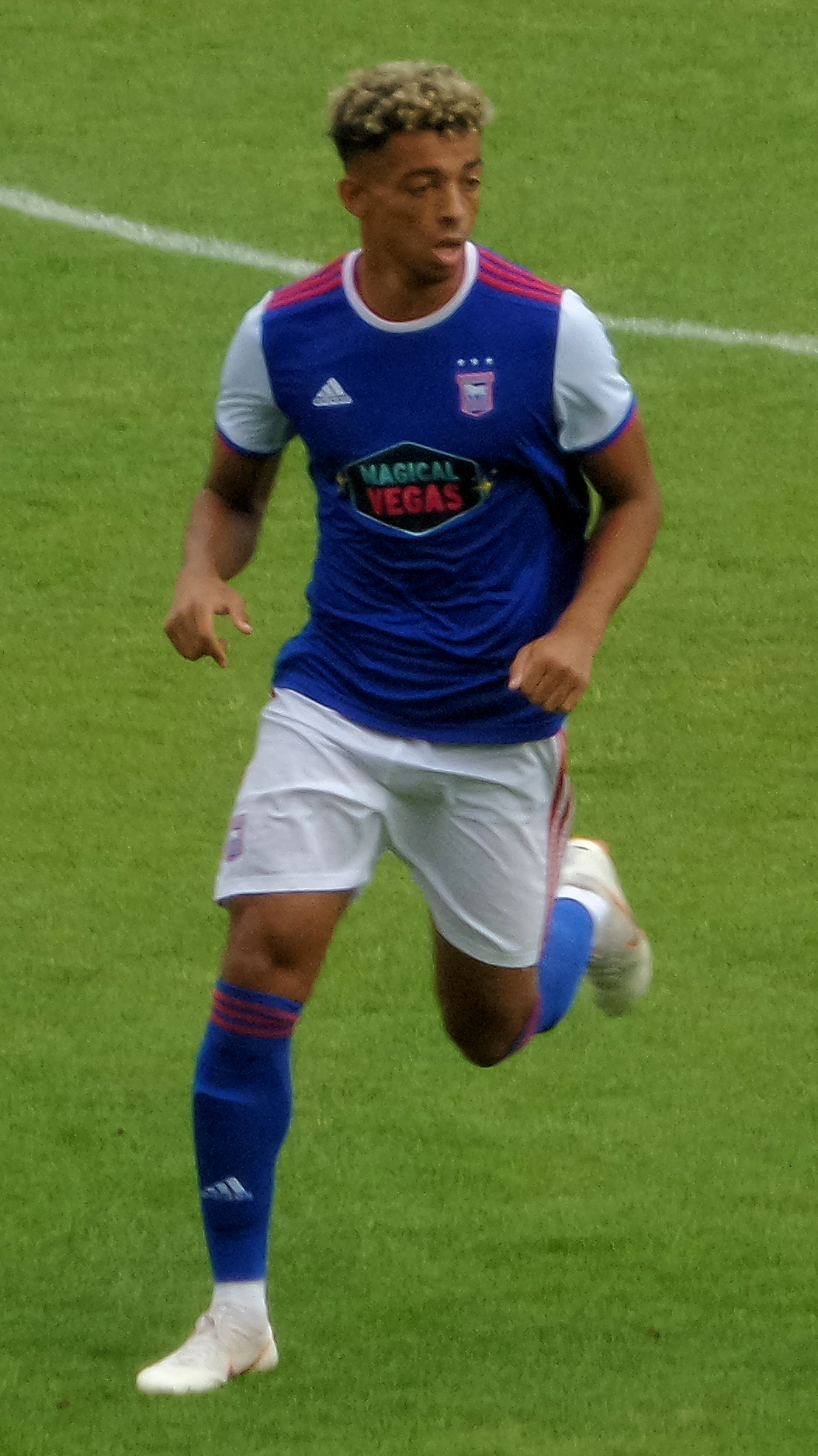
Folami playing for Ipswich Town in 2018

Born in Sydney, Folami played for the Football NSW Institute and the Sutherland Sharks at youth level and trained with Australian side Western Sydney Wanderers. In 2015, he joined Ipswich Town's academy at the age of fifteen. After working his way through the youth system at Portman Road, he went on to make his full senior debut in a 2–1 defeat against Crystal Palace in the EFL Cup second round on 22 August 2017. He made his league debut for the club on 2 April 2018 in a 2–2 draw against Millwall. In May 2018, Folami signed a new three-year contract at Ipswich until 2021. On 14 January 2019, Folami tore his achilles tendon during an under-23 match against Cardiff City, ruling him out for the remainder of the season.

Following his recovery from injury Folami appeared for Ipswich's under-23 side before returning to first-team action on 12 November 2019, starting in a 0–1 away loss to Colchester United in an EFL Trophy group stage match.

==== Stevenage (loan) ====
On 31 January 2020, Folami signed for Stevenage on loan until the end of the 2019–20 season. He made his debut on 8 February, coming on as a second-half substitute in a 2–1 loss to Exeter City. He made two substitute appearances for Stevenage before the 2019–20 season was suspended due to the Coronavirus outbreak.

=== Return to Ipswich Town ===
He scored his first goal for Ipswich in an EFL Trophy tie against Gillingham on 6 October 2020.

In April 2021, Ipswich announced that Folami would be released at the end of the 2020–21 season following the end of his contract.

=== Melbourne Victory ===
On 28 October 2020, Folami joined Australian A-League side Melbourne Victory on loan until the end of the season. He scored his first goal for Melbourne Victory in a 2–2 draw with Thai side Chiangrai United in the AFC Champions League on 30 November. In July 2021, after being released by Ipswich Town, Folami signed a permanent two-year contract with Melbourne Victory.

== International career ==
Folami is of Nigerian descent. In October 2018, he was called up to the Australia U19 squad to compete in the 2018 AFC U-19 Championship held in Indonesia. He made 4 appearances during the tournament, scoring one goal, as the Young Socceroos exited the U-19 championships at the quarter-final stage. Folami impressed with his performances during the tournament, with Fox Sports describing him as "an absolute revelation" and stating that he had been "Australia's best player".

Folami made his debut for the Australia U23 team in a 2–1 loss to Iran on 14 October 2019. He scored his first goal for the under-23s while winning his second cap, appearing as a second-half substitute and scoring in a 5–1 victory over China on 15 November 2019.

He debuted with the senior Australia national team in a 2–0 2022 FIFA World Cup qualification loss to Japan on 24 March 2022.

== Style of play ==
Folami plays as a winger. He is known for his speed.

== Career statistics ==
As of match played 11 November 2022

Appearances and goals by club, season and competition
Club	Season	Division	League		National Cup		League Cup		Other		Total	
Club	Season	Division	Apps	Goals	Apps	Goals	Apps	Goals	Apps	Goals	Apps	Goals
Ipswich Town	2017–18	Championship	4	0	0	0	1	0	—		5	0
Ipswich Town	2018–19	Championship	0	0	0	0	0	0	—		0	0
Ipswich Town	2019–20	League One	0	0	0	0	0	0	1 (Note: Appearance in EFL Trophy)	0	1	0
Ipswich Town	2020–21	League One	0	0	0	0	0	0	1	1	1	1
Ipswich Town	Total		4	0	0	0	1	0	2	1	7	1
Stevenage (loan)	2019–20	League Two	2	0	0	0	0	0	0	0	2	0
Melbourne Victory (loan)	2019–20	A-League	0	0	0	0	—		5 (Note: Appearances in AFC Champions League)	1	5	1
Melbourne Victory (loan)	2020–21	A-League	17	3	—		—		—		17	3
Melbourne Victory	2021–22	A-League	24	3	1	0	—		3 (Note: One appearance and one goal in AFC Champions League, Two appearances in A-League Finals series)	1	28	4
Melbourne Victory	2022–23	A-League	26	1	0	0	—		—		6	0
Melbourne Victory	Total		47	6	1	0	0	0	8	2	56	8
Career total			53	6	1	0	1	0	10	3	65	9

=== International ===
As of match played 24 March 2022

Appearances and goals by national team and year
National team	Year	Apps	Goals
Australia	2022	1	0
Total		1	0

== Honours ==
=== Club ===
Melbourne Victory

- FFA Cup: 2021

=== International ===
Australia U23

- AFC U-23 Asian Cup third place: 2020
