= Elvis Kamsoba =

Burundian footballer

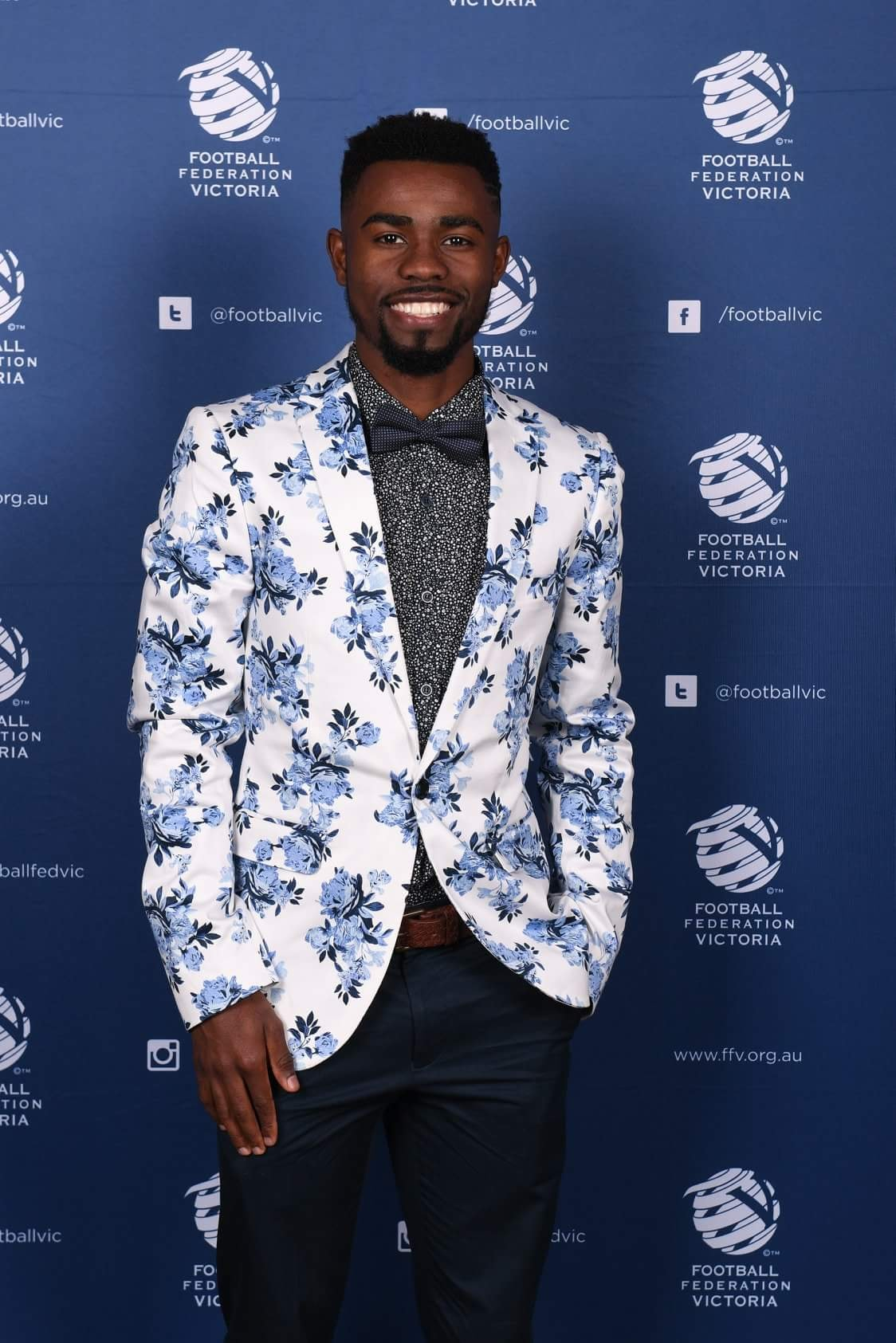

Personal information
- Date of birth: 27 June 1996 (age 30)
- Place of birth: Nyanza Lac, Burundi
- Height: 1.64 m (5 ft 5 in)
- Position: Winger

Youth career
- 2011–2012: FFSA NTC

Senior career*
Years	Team	Apps	(Gls)
2012–2014	Playford City	26	(20)
2014–2015	Adelaide Raiders	48	(19)
2016	Croydon Kings	22	(3)
2017	Melbourne Knights	23	(6)
2018	Avondale	26	(8)
2019–2021	Melbourne Victory	61	(6)
2021–2022	Sydney FC	17	(3)
2022–2023	Sepahan	15	(0)
2023–2024	PSS Sleman	15	(0)
2024–2025	Balzan	13	(1)
2025–2026	Immigration	10	(2)
2026–	Terengganu	4	(0)

International career
2019–	Burundi	9	(0)
- * Club domestic league appearances and goals as of 24 December 2025

Elvis Kamsoba (born 27 June 1996) is a Burundian professional footballer who plays as a winger for the Burundi national team.

== Early life ==
Elvis Kamsoba was born on 27 June 1996 in Burundi. He moved with his family to a Tanzanian refugee camp when he was four months old, and lived there for 11 years before migrating to Adelaide, South Australia, in 2008.

His younger brother is footballer Pacifique Niyongabire.

== Club career ==
In October 2016, Melbourne Knights announced the signing of Elvis Kamsoba for the 2017 NPL Victoria season. Kamsoba scored six goals for Knights in 2017, as his side narrowly avoided relegation, defeating Dandenong City in the promotion-relegation playoff.

Kamsoba came to Australia's attention after a brilliant 2018 FFA Cup campaign for Avondale FC. Avondale went on to make the quarter-final, the club's best finish before losing out to reigning champions Sydney FC. As a result of his impressive performances with Avondale, Kamsoba was awarded the inaugural Mike Cockerill Medal, awarded to the best NPL player in the FFA Cup.

=== Melbourne Victory ===
Following a successful trial period, Kamsoba signed for A-League club Melbourne Victory on an 18-month contract on 3 January 2019. He made his professional debut for the club on 9 January 2019 in an A-League match against Adelaide United.

Alongside Jake Brimmer and Rudy Gestede, Kamsoba finished as Melbourne Victory's joint top goalscorer for the 2020–21 A-League season, with 5 goals.

=== Sydney FC ===
At the end of his contract at Melbourne Victory, Kamsoba departed the club and joined Sydney FC on a two-year contract.

=== Sepahan ===
Following a successful season with the harbourside Sydney club, in which he contributed with 3 goals in 17 appearances Kamsoba departed the Sky Blues, with the club having accepted a transfer from Iranian club Sepahan, for an undisclosed six-figure amount. Kamsoba was released at the end of the season, having made only 15 appearances for Sepahan, the majority of which were sporadic, and off the bench.

=== PSS Sleman ===
On 21 November 2023, he signed a contract with Indonesian club PSS Sleman to play in the second round of 2023–24 Liga 1. He made his debut with the team on 26 November 2023, during a home match against Barito Putera.

=== Immigration ===
In August 2025, Kamsoba signed with Immigration club to face the 2025–26 Malaysia Super League season.

== Other appearances ==
Elvis Kamsoba has played in the African Nations Cup of South Australia.

== Career statistics ==
As of 30 April 2024

Club	Season	League			Cup (Note: Includes appearances in the FFA Cup.)		Continental (Note: Includes appearances in the AFC Champions League.)		Other (Note: Includes appearances in the A-League finals.)		Total	
Club	Season	Division	Apps	Goals	Apps	Goals	Apps	Goals	Apps	Goals	Apps	Goals
Melbourne Victory	2018–19	A-League	16	0	0	0	4	0	2	0	20	0
Melbourne Victory	2019–20	A-League	25	1	1	0	3	1	0	0	29	1
Melbourne Victory	2020–21	A-League	20	5	0	0	0	0	0	0	19	5
Melbourne Victory	Total		61	6	1	0	7	1	2	0	68	6
Sydney FC	2021–22	A-League Men	17	3	3	2	4	0	0	0	24	5
Sepahan	2022–23	Persian Gulf Pro League	15	0	0	0	0	0	0	0	15	0
PSS Sleman	2023–24	Liga 1	15	0	0	0	0	0	0	0	15	0
Balzan	2024–2025	Maltese Premier League	13	1	1	0	0	0	0	0	14	1
Career total			121	10	5	2	11	1	2	0	139	13

== International career ==
Elvis was eligible to represent both Burundi and Australia. On 24 March 2019 he confirmed that he had rejected a call-up to the Burundi national football team. Two months later, he accepted a call-up for Burundi's provisional squad ahead of the 2019 Africa Cup of Nations. He made his debut on 17 June 2019 in a friendly against Tunisia, as a starter.

== Honours ==
=== Individual ===
- Michael Cockerill Medal: 2018
