= Rudy Gestede =

French footballer (born 1988)

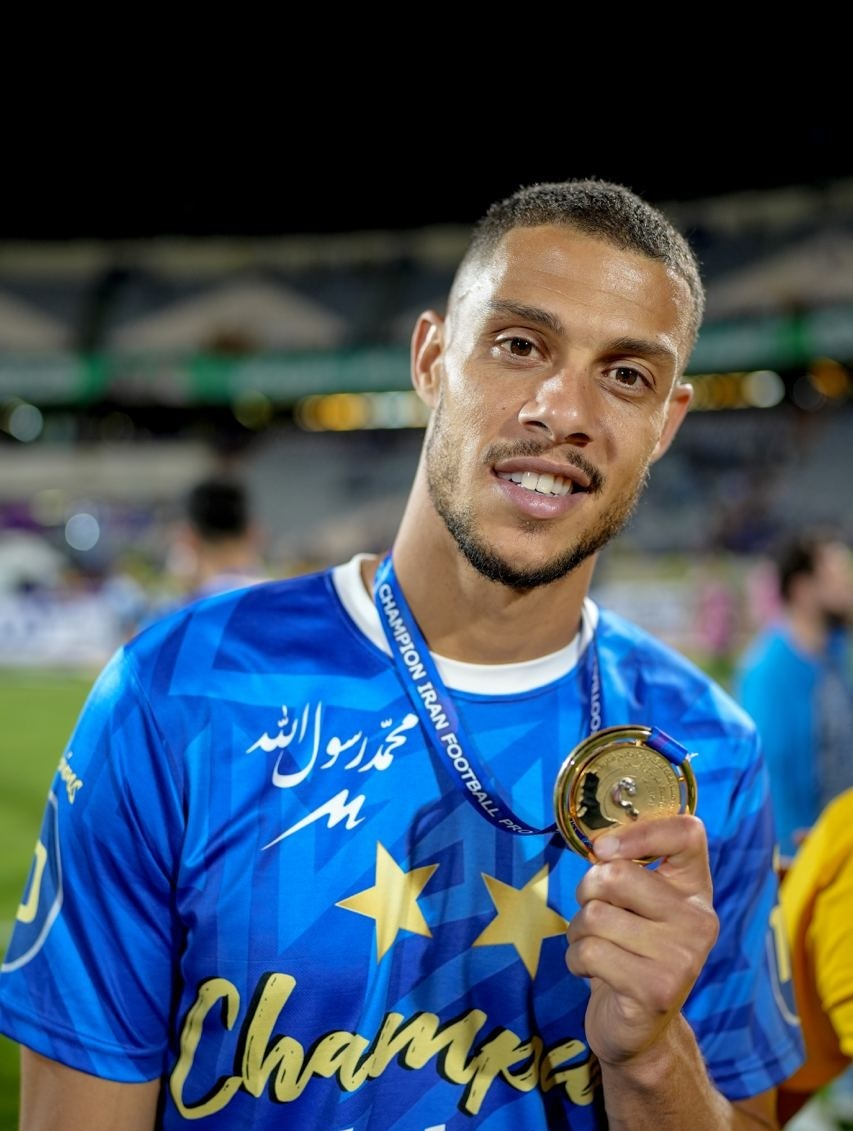
- Gestede with Esteghlal in 2022

Personal information
- Full name: Rudy Philippe Michel Camille Gestede
- Date of birth: 10 October 1988 (age 38)
- Place of birth: Essey-lès-Nancy, Meurthe-et-Moselle, France
- Height: 1.93 m (6 ft 4 in)
- Position: Striker

Team information
- Current team: Blackburn Rovers (Head of Football Operations)

Youth career
- 2004–2007: Metz

Senior career*
Years	Team	Apps	(Gls)
2005–2010	Metz B	27	(3)
2007–2011	Metz	28	(3)
2009–2010	→ Cannes (loan)	22	(4)
2011–2014	Cardiff City	55	(7)
2013–2014	→ Blackburn Rovers (loan)	6	(2)
2014–2015	Blackburn Rovers	60	(32)
2015–2017	Aston Villa	50	(9)
2017–2020	Middlesbrough	59	(6)
2020–2021	Melbourne Victory	18	(5)
2021	Panetolikos	3	(1)
2021–2022	Esteghlal	23	(3)
Total		351	(75)

International career
2006–2008	France U19	17	(4)
2013–2016	Benin	11	(3)
- * Club domestic league appearances and goals

Rudy Philippe Michel Camille Gestede (born 10 October 1988) is a former professional footballer who played as a striker. He is currently head of football operations at Blackburn Rovers.

After coming through the youth ranks at Metz, Gestede spent a year on loan gaining experience with Cannes, scoring four goals in 22 appearances, before returning to Metz in 2010. In the summer of 2011, he joined Cardiff City, helping the club to secure promotion to the Premier League. However, he found first team chances limited with Cardiff at the start of 2013–14, prompting a loan move to Blackburn Rovers in 2013. In January 2014, he made a permanent transfer to Blackburn and established himself in the first team, forming a prolific partnership with Jordan Rhodes in attack.

Gestede played internationally for France at under-19 level before switching international allegiance to Benin, going on to win 11 caps for the national side since his debut in 2013.

== Club career ==
=== Metz ===
Born in Essey-lès-Nancy, Meurthe-et-Moselle, Gestede started at youth level at the age of 16, in 2004, where he played for Metz. A year later, he signed a professional contract with Metz's B Team. In 2007, he was promoted to play for the first team, whilst still also continuing to play for the B team, but in 2010, he ended his five years playing for the B team when he was sent on loan to Cannes.

=== Cardiff City ===
Gestede joined Football League Championship side Cardiff City on a week-long trial during City's training camp in Seville, Spain in July 2011. He scored his first goal for Cardiff in the 25th minute of the club's pre-season friendly against Charlton Athletic on 15 July. On 23 July, Gestede passed his medical and was unveiled as a Cardiff City player three days later. He made his competitive debut for Cardiff on 7 August against West Ham United, coming on in the 68th minute in place of Robert Earnshaw, setting up Kenny Miller for the match's only goal. Gestede's first start came the following game three days later, on 10 August, against Oxford United in the League Cup. He made his 50th appearance in a 5–3 victory over Huddersfield Town, putting in a man of the match performance. Gestede scored his first goal for Cardiff City against Leicester City in the League Cup, before going on to convert from the penalty spot in his side's 7–6 penalty shootout victory over Leicester.

Gestede's first league goal came on 15 October against Ipswich Town, with the game also marking his first league start for Cardiff. The following game, however, on 21 October, he suffered an hamstring injury, which meant he was ruled out for several weeks. He returned in a goalless draw at Millwall on 10 December. Gestede scored a penalty in Cardiff City's semi-final victory against Crystal Palace in the League Cup. Gestede scored his third goal for Cardiff on 14 February 2012, in a 3–1 win over Peterborough. In the League Cup Final against Premier League club Liverpool at Wembley Stadium on 26 February, Cardiff City lost 3–2 on penalties, with Gestede missing one of City's spot-kicks. On 19 April, Gestede signed a two-year deal keeping him at Cardiff City Stadium until 2014.

Gestede suffered a pre-season injury which kept him out of the first two months of the 2012–13 season. He made his return on 6 October coming on in the second half against Ipswich Town. Gestede's first goal of the season came on 15 December in a 2–1 loss against Peterborough United. Gestede scored two headers as City beat Nottingham Forest 3–0 at Cardiff City Stadium. He collected a winners' medal as City won the Championship title and were promoted to the Premier League in April 2013.

=== Blackburn Rovers ===
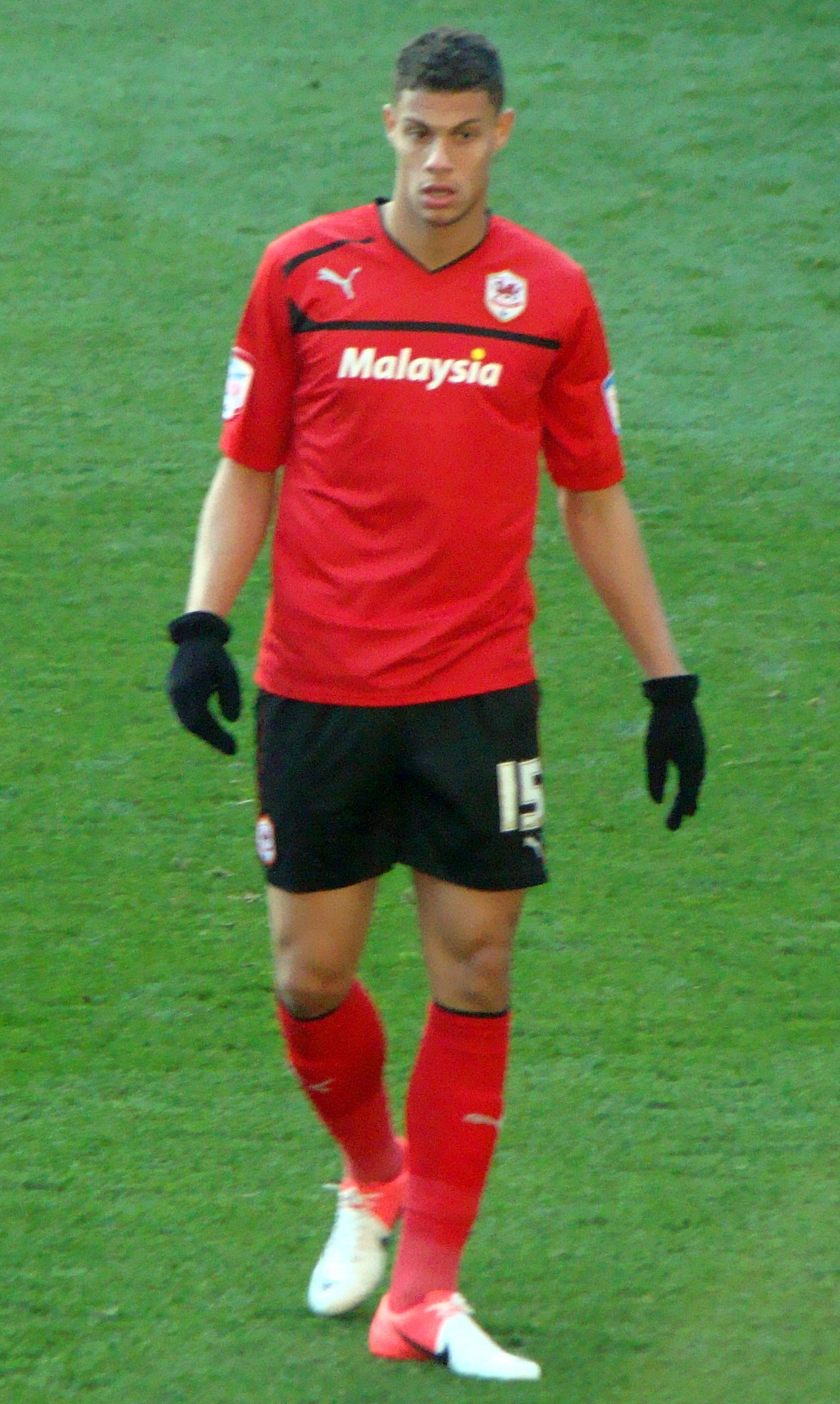
Gestede playing for Cardiff City in 2012

On 26 November 2013, Gestede joined Blackburn Rovers on loan until the end of 2013 under an emergency loan arrangement after he found his playing time at Cardiff reduced since their promotion to the Premier League. Blackburn manager Gary Bowyer stated that Gestede was the type of player the team needed to assist talisman Jordan Rhodes in an important season for the club.

Gestede scored his first goal for Rovers on 1 January 2014 against Leeds United via a header in a 2–1 victory.

On 1 January 2014, Gestede signed for the club permanently, on a three-and-a-half-year deal, along with Tom Cairney, who was also on loan at Blackburn at the same time as him. On 21 April, Gestede scored a first-half hat-trick, against Birmingham City. He won the Championship Player of the Month Award for April after scoring six goals in the seven games in that month.

=== Aston Villa ===
On 31 July 2015, after intense speculation, Gestede signed for Premier League club Aston Villa on a five-year deal for an undisclosed fee, believed to be £6 million. He made his debut as a substitute away at Bournemouth, heading the winning goal in a 1–0 victory. On 22 September 2015, he scored the winner in a 1–0 League Cup victory over archrivals Birmingham City. On 26 September 2015, he scored a brace in a 3–2 defeat to Liverpool away at Anfield.

=== Middlesbrough ===
On 2 January 2017, Aston Villa accepted a bid from Premier League club Middlesbrough for Gestede, reported to be in the region of £6m. He officially signed for the club on 4 January 2017. Gestede made his debut for the club and his top-level return in a 0–0 draw against Watford on 14 January 2017. He scored his first goal for the club in a 3–1 defeat against Manchester United on 19 March 2017. On 21 August 2017, Middlesbrough rejected a £6 million bid for the player from Leeds United.

He picked up an injury in September 2017, after picking up a dead leg which required surgery after a bleed. He returned from the injury on 2 December 2017 against Bristol City, he picked up another injury which almost ended his season when he fractured his ankle against Hull City in February 2018. He returned on 15 May 2018 for Middlesbrough as a second-half substitute in the Championship Playoff Semi Final second leg against Aston Villa.

Gestede was released by Middlesbrough on 30 June 2020, after previously refusing to play the remaining games of the 2019–20 season.

=== Melbourne Victory ===
On 25 November 2020 Melbourne Victory announced that they had signed Gestede. He was quoted as saying “I am extremely pleased to have signed with Melbourne Victory for this season, after speaking with the club, in particular Grant Brebner, I was very impressed with the vision they outlined around the brand of football they want to play and the role they want me to play.”

In his debut season with the Victory, Gestede made 18 appearances, finishing with 5 goals and 2 assists; alongside Jake Brimmer and Elvis Kamsoba, Gestede finished as Melbourne Victory's joint top goalscorer for the 2020–21 season.

=== Panetolikos ===
After a season at Melbourne Victory, he signed a 2-year deal for Greek club Panetolikos, but he played 3 games (all in the starting eleven) and scored one goal.

=== Esteghlal ===
On 30 October 2021, Gestede signed for Esteghlal on a two-year contract. He was given shirt number 39. Six days later, he made his debut for the club in a 1–1 draw against Fajr Sepasi. On 24 December, he scored his first goal for the club in a 3–0 victory against Shahr Khodro. On 17 March 2022, he scored 2 minutes after coming on as a substitute in a match against Persepolis, becoming Esteghlal's first non-Iranian player to score in the Tehran Derby. He left the club after his first season following his contract termination by mutual consent.

He announced his retirement a year later.

== International career ==
Gestede played for the France under-19 national team between 2006 and 2008. He was called up for the Benin national team in February 2013 for the World Cup qualifiers due to a parent being of Beninois origin; he was also eligible for the United States through a grandparent.

After three years, he was recalled to the national team in August 2019.

== Post-playing career ==
On 14 June 2024, Gestede returned to former club Blackburn Rovers as Head of Football Operations.

== Personal life ==
In the summer of 2012, Rudy's wife, Hawa, gave birth to their first child, Elijah Gestede. He is a Muslim.

== Career statistics ==
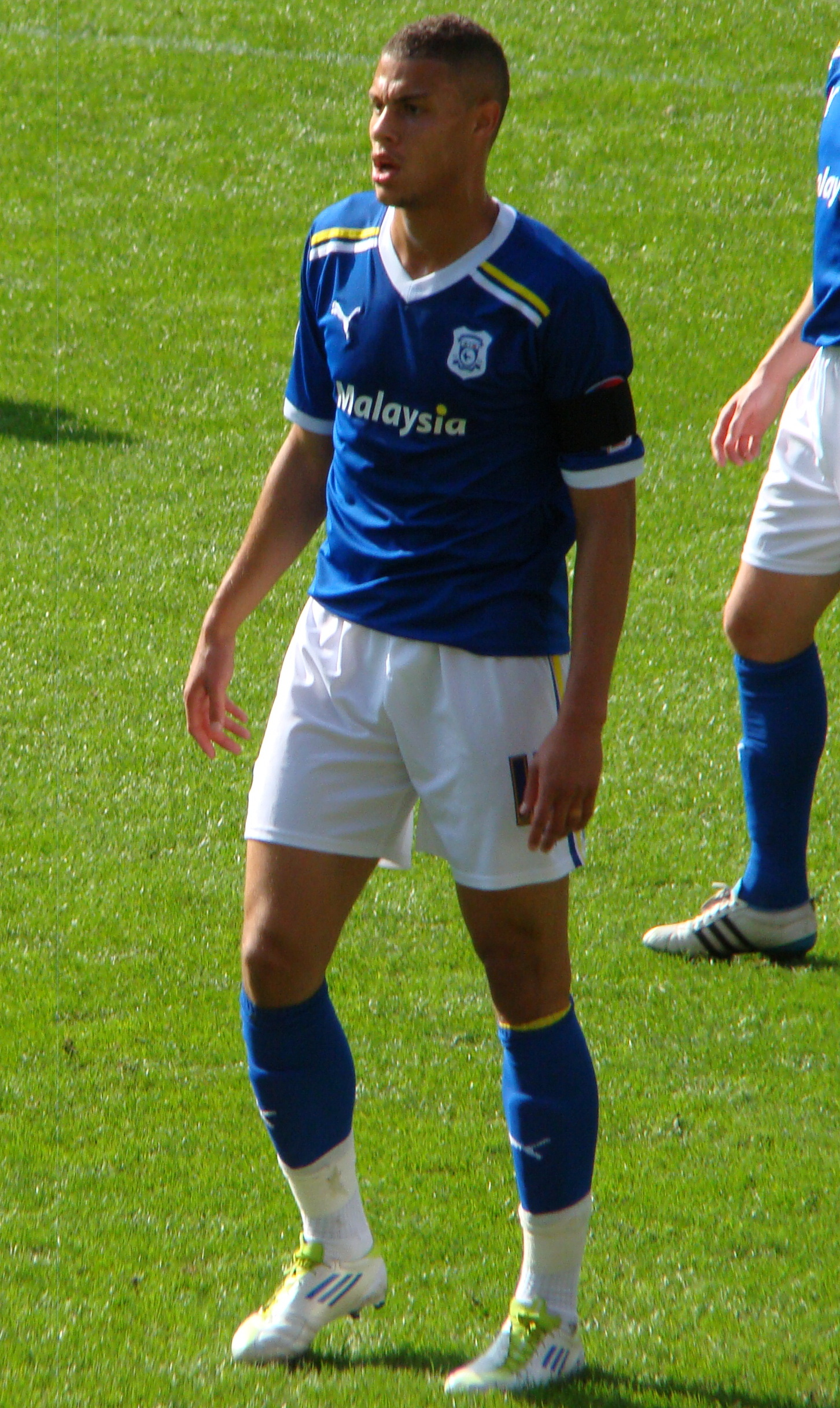
Gestede playing for Cardiff City in 2011

As of match played on 13 July 2022

Appearances and goals by club, season and competition
Club	Season	League			National cup (Note: Includes Coupe de France, FA Cup, Iranian Hazfi Cup)		League cup (Note: Includes Coupe de la Ligue, Football League Cup)		Total	
Club	Season	Division	Apps	Goals	Apps	Goals	Apps	Goals	Apps	Goals
Metz	2010–11	Ligue 2	11	3	2	1	1	1	14	5
Cardiff City	2011–12	Championship	25	2	1	0	5	1	31	3
Cardiff City	2012–13	Championship	27	5	0	0	0	0	27	5
Cardiff City	2013–14	Premier League	3	0	0	0	2	1	5	1
Cardiff City	Total		55	7	1	0	7	2	63	9
Blackburn Rovers (loan)	2013–14	Championship	6	1	1	0	0	0	7	1
Blackburn Rovers	2013–14	Championship	21	12	1	0	0	0	22	12
Blackburn Rovers	2014–15	Championship	39	20	4	2	1	0	44	22
Blackburn Rovers	Total		66	33	6	2	1	0	73	35
Aston Villa	2015–16	Premier League	32	5	2	0	2	1	36	6
Aston Villa	2016–17	Championship	18	4	2	0	2	0	22	4
Aston Villa	Total		50	9	4	0	4	1	58	10
Middlesbrough	2016–17	Premier League	16	1	3	1	0	0	19	2
Middlesbrough	2017–18	Championship	19	3	1	1	1	0	21	4
Middlesbrough	2018–19	Championship	4	0	2	0	2	0	8	0
Middlesbrough	2019–20	Championship	19	2	2	0	1	0	22	2
Middlesbrough	Total		59	6	8	2	4	0	71	8
Melbourne Victory	2020–21	A-League	17	5	—		—		17	5
Esteghlal	2021–22	Persian Gulf Pro League	23	3	2	0	—		25	3
Career total			269	64	23	5	17	4	292	73

== Honours ==
Cardiff City

- Football League Championship: 2012–13
- Football League Cup runner-up: 2011–12

Esteghlal

- Persian Gulf Pro League: 2021–22

Individual

- Football League Championship Player of the Month: April 2014
