= Dylan Ryan (soccer) =

Australian professional soccer player

Personal information
- Full name: Dylan James Ryan
- Date of birth: 10 June 2000 (age 26)
- Place of birth: Wollongong, Australia
- Height: 1.84 m (6 ft 0 in)
- Position: Centre-back

Team information
- Current team: Wollongong Wolves

Youth career
- 2015–2016: Liverpool

Senior career*
Years	Team	Apps	(Gls)
2016–2021	Willem II	0	(0)
2020–2021	→ Melbourne Victory (loan)	19	(2)
2021–2023	Den Bosch	19	(0)
2024–	Wollongong Wolves	48	(2)

International career
2019–2021	Australia U23	9	(0)
Medal record
Men's football
Representing Australia
AFC U-23 Asian Cup
Third place	2020 Thailand	U-23 Team
AFF U-16 Youth Championship
Third place	2015 Cambodia	U-17 Team
- * Club domestic league appearances and goals as of 15 July 2025

Dylan James Ryan is an Australian professional soccer player who plays as a centre-back for Wollongong Wolves FC.

== Early life ==
Ryan was born in Wollongong. He grew up in Thirroul before moving to England aged fifteen.

== Club career ==
=== Youth ===
After training at the New South Wales Institute of Sport, Ryan joined English club Liverpool's under-18 side in 2015 after playing in a youth tournament in Manchester.

=== Willem II ===
In December 2016, Ryan signed a three-year senior deal with Dutch side Willem II. He extended his contract with the club in early 2020.

=== Melbourne Victory ===
Melbourne Victory announced that they had signed Ryan on a one year loan in November 2020. He made his first-team debut on 24 November, starting against Beijing Guoan in the 2020 AFC Champions League. In June 2021, it was announced that his loan ended and he returned to Willem II.

== International career ==
Ryan was a member of the Australian under-23 team which finished third at the 2020 AFC U-23 Championship to qualify for the 2020 Summer Olympics.

== Honours ==
Australia U-23

- AFC U-23 Asian Cup: 3rd place 2020
