= Nicholas D'Agostino (soccer) =

Australian soccer player (born 1998)

Nick D'Agostino
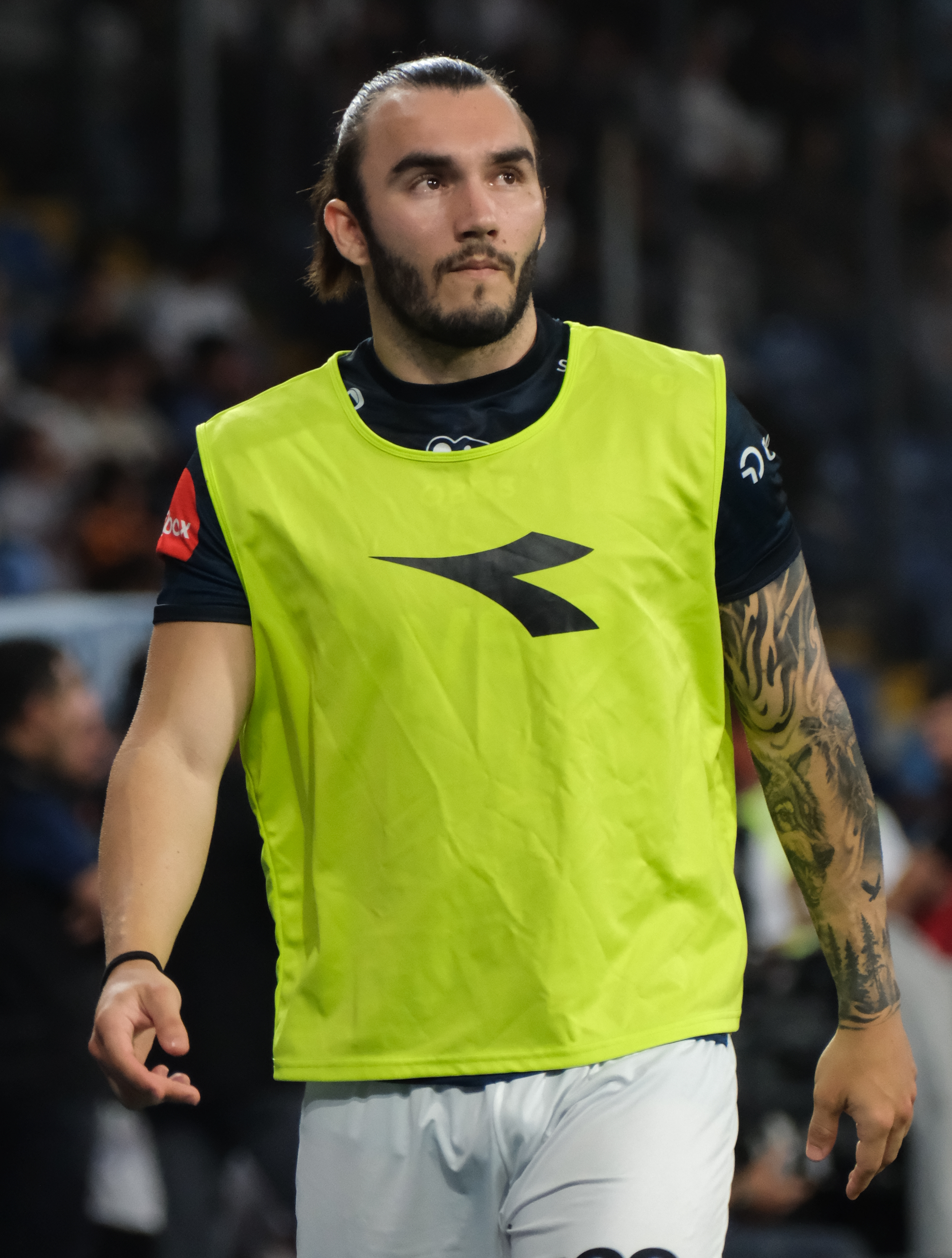
- D'Agostino in 2025

Personal information
- Full name: Nicholas D'Agostino
- Date of birth: 25 February 1998 (age 28)
- Place of birth: Gold Coast, Queensland, Australia
- Height: 1.75 m (5 ft 9 in)
- Position: Striker

Team information
- Current team: Viking

Youth career
- Runaway Bay
- QAS
- Brisbane Roar

Senior career*
Years	Team	Apps	(Gls)
2014	FFA COE	4	(2)
2015–2018	Brisbane Roar NPL	22	(17)
2015–2019	Brisbane Roar	35	(3)
2019–2021	Perth Glory	28	(8)
2021–2023	Melbourne Victory	38	(13)
2023–	Viking	48	(9)
2025	Viking 2	1	(0)
2026	→ Brisbane Roar (loan)	6	(2)

International career^{‡}
2013	Australia U17	2	(3)
2019–2021	Australia U23	9	(5)
2022–	Australia	3	(0)
Medal record
Men's football
Representing Australia
AFC U-23 Asian Cup
Third place	2020 Thailand	U-23 Team
AFF U-16 Youth Championship
Third place	2013 Myanmar	U-17 Team
- * Club domestic league appearances and goals as of 28 April 2026 ‡ National team caps and goals as of 10 September 2023

Nicholas D'Agostino (born 25 February 1998) is an Australian professional soccer player who plays as a striker for Viking, and the Australia national team.

== Early life ==
D'Agostino was born on the Gold Coast into a family of Italian and Maltese descent. He began playing junior football for the Musgrave Mustangs at the Under 7s level before switching to play for Runaway Bay in the local Gold Coast Football competitions. D'Agostino attended The Southport School throughout his upbringing.

== Club career ==
=== Brisbane Roar ===
D'Agostino signed a two-year contract with Brisbane Roar on 5 August 2016.

=== Perth Glory ===
In June 2019, following new coach Robbie Fowler's changes in squads, D'Agostino left Brisbane Roar and joined Perth Glory. On 7 August 2019, D’Agostino made his competitive debut for Perth Glory in a FFA Cup fixture against Western Sydney Wanderers.

=== Melbourne Victory ===
D'Agostino joined Melbourne Victory in August 2021. He signed a three-year contract, reuniting him with his former manager Tony Popovic.

=== Viking FK ===
In January 2023, D'Agostino transferred to Norwegian club Viking for an undisclosed fee. He signed a four-year contract with the club. D'Agostino made ten appearances and scored two goals as Viking won the 2025 Eliteserien.

== International career ==
He was initially eligible to represent Australia, Malta and Italy due to his origins.

He was selected by Graham Arnold for the under-23 team in the 2020 AFC U-23 Championship qualifiers which took place in Cambodia. After being goalless in his first two matches, he scored a double in the final group match against South Korea to help Australia advance through to the finals which is going to be held in Thailand. In the main tournament, D'Agostino became the hero for Australia, having scored three goals: two which guaranteed his team a victory over Thailand at the group stage, and especially, the only goal against Uzbekistan in the third-place encounter which clinched Australia a place for the 2020 Summer Olympics.

The Olyroos beat Argentina in their first group match but were unable to win another match.

He was called up to the senior Australia squad for the 2022 FIFA World Cup qualifiers in March 2022.

== Career statistics ==
As of match played on 8 November 2025

Appearances and goals by club, season and competition
Club	Season	League			National Cup		Continental		Total	
Club	Season	Division	Apps	Goals	Apps	Goals	Apps	Goals	Apps	Goals
Brisbane Roar	2015–16	A-League	1	0	0	0	0	0	1	0
Brisbane Roar	2016–17	A-League	8	2	0	0	6 (Note: Appearance(s) in AFC Champions League)	0	14	2
Brisbane Roar	2017–18	A-League	9	0	1	0	0	0	10	0
Brisbane Roar	2018–19	A-League	17	1	0	0	0	0	17	1
Brisbane Roar	Total		35	3	1	0	6	0	42	3
Perth Glory	2019–20	A-League	12	3	1	0	2	0	15	3
Perth Glory	2020–21	A-League	16	5	0	0	0	0	16	5
Perth Glory	Total		28	8	1	0	2	0	31	8
Melbourne Victory	2021–22	A-League	26	10	3	2	1	2	30	14
Melbourne Victory	2022–23	A-League	12	3	0	0	0	0	12	3
Melbourne Victory	Total		38	13	3	2	1	2	42	17
Viking	2023	Eliteserien	21	3	6	1	—		27	4
Viking	2024	Eliteserien	17	4	1	1	—		18	5
Viking	2025	Eliteserien	10	2	0	0	2 (Note: Appearances in UEFA Conference League)	0	12	2
Viking	Total		48	9	7	2	2	0	57	11
Career total			149	33	12	4	11	2	172	39

== Honours ==
Melbourne Victory

- FFA Cup: 2021

Viking

- Eliteserien: 2025

Individual

- PFA A-League Team of the Season: 2021–22
