= Aaron Anderson (soccer) =

Australian soccer player (born 2000)

Personal information
- Full name: Aaron Anderson
- Date of birth: 25 September 2000 (age 26)
- Place of birth: East Melbourne, Victoria, Australia
- Height: 1.84 m (6 ft 0 in)
- Position: Centre back

Team information
- Current team: Preston Lions
- Number: 4

Youth career
- 2016–2022: Melbourne Victory

Senior career*
| Years | Team | Apps | (Gls) |
| 2017–2022 | Melbourne Victory NPL | 75 | (1) |
| 2019–2022 | Melbourne Victory | 14 | (0) |
| 2023 | Altona Magic | 10 | (0) |
| 2024– | Preston Lions | 48 | (4) |
- * Club domestic league appearances and goals as of 5 September 2025 ‡ National team caps and goals as of 8 May 2019

Aaron Anderson (born 25 September 2000) is an Australian professional soccer player who plays as a central defender for National Premier Leagues Victoria club Preston Lions.

== Club career ==
On 8 May 2019, he made his professional debut for Melbourne Victory against Daegu FC in the 2019 AFC Champions League.

== Honours ==
=== Club ===
Melbourne Victory

- FFA Cup: 2021
