= Jay Barnett =

Australian soccer player (born 2001)

Personal information
- Full name: Jay Barnett
- Date of birth: 29 November 2001 (age 24)
- Place of birth: Adelaide, Australia
- Height: 1.79 m (5 ft 10 in)
- Position: Defensive midfielder

Team information
- Current team: Adelaide United
- Number: 14

Youth career
- 2015–2016: SA NTC

Senior career*
Years	Team	Apps	(Gls)
2017	FFA CoE	22	(2)
2017–2019	Brisbane Roar NPL	12	(0)
2019	Brisbane Roar	3	(0)
2019–2023	Melbourne Victory NPL	14	(1)
2019–2023	Melbourne Victory	35	(0)
2023–2024	Adelaide United NPL	11	(0)
2023–	Adelaide United	53	(1)

International career^{‡}
2019–2022	Australia U20	2	(0)
- * Club domestic league appearances and goals as of 21 November 2025 ‡ National team caps and goals as of 23 March 2020

Jay Barnett (born 29 November 2001) is an Australian professional soccer player who plays as a defensive midfielder for Adelaide United.

== Career ==
=== Brisbane Roar ===
Barnett signed his first professional contract with Brisbane Roar on 18 October 2017, penning a two-year Scholarship deal with the club. He was part of the 2018-19 Y-League championship winning Brisbane Roar Youth team, playing the full 90 minutes as the Young Roar beat Western Sydney Wanderers Youth 3–1 in the 2019 Y-League Grand Final on 1 February 2019.

Barnett made his first professional appearance as a second-half substitute in the Roar's 2–2 with Western Sydney Wanderers in Round 16 of the 2018–19 season.

=== Melbourne Victory ===
On 4 June 2019, Barnett joined Melbourne Victory on a one-year contract. Barnett made 47 appearances for Melbourne Victory in all competitions. After three-and-a-half seasons at Melbourne Victory, the club announced they had agreed to mutually terminate his contract.

=== Adelaide United ===
On 8 February 2023, Adelaide United announced they signed Barnett on a two-and-a-half-year contract.

== Honours ==
Brisbane Roar

- National Youth League: 2018–19

Melbourne Victory

- FFA Cup: 2021

== Personal life ==
He is the son of former West Adelaide NSL player Michael Barnett.
