= Jake Brimmer =

Australian soccer player (born 1998)

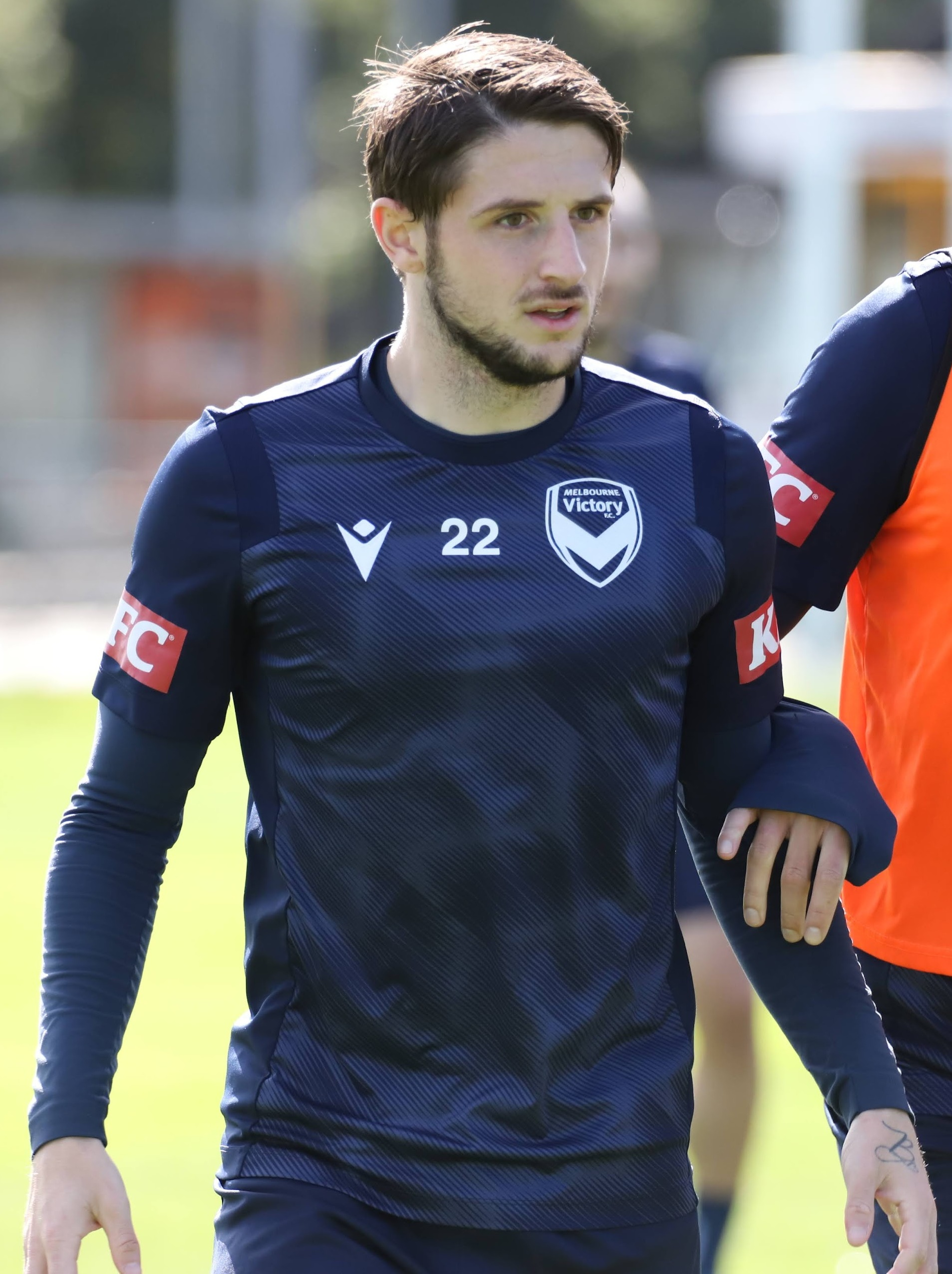

Personal information
- Full name: Jake William Brimmer
- Date of birth: 3 April 1998 (age 28)
- Place of birth: Melbourne, Australia
- Height: 1.69 m (5 ft 7 in)
- Position: Attacking midfielder

Team information
- Current team: Auckland FC
- Number: 22

Youth career
- 2011–2013: Nunawading City
- 2013–2014: FFV NTC
- 2014–2017: Liverpool

Senior career*
Years	Team	Apps	(Gls)
2017–2020	Perth Glory	60	(0)
2018	Perth Glory NPL	12	(4)
2020–2024	Melbourne Victory	99	(15)
2024–	Auckland FC	42	(3)

International career^{‡}
2014–2015	Australia U17	13	(3)
2016	Australia U20	2	(0)
- * Club domestic league appearances and goals as of 20 January 2026 ‡ National team caps and goals as of 22 October 2016

Jake William Brimmer (born 3 April 1998) is an Australian soccer player who plays as an attacking midfielder for A-League club Auckland FC.

== Club career ==
Brimmer began to show his skills at the Rowville Sports Academy and with his junior club Nunawading City before joining the FFV NTC program. Continuing to impress, Brimmer was in talks of a contract with Melbourne Victory before being spotted by Liverpool scout Barry Hunter, and subsequently signed a three-year deal for his childhood team. On 10 June 2017, he was released by Liverpool.

On 31 July 2017, Brimmer returned to Australia, joining A-League side Perth Glory. In October 2020, Brimmer left Perth Glory for family reasons.

On 9 October 2020, Brimmer was transferred to A-League side Melbourne Victory.

In his debut season with the Victory, Brimmer made 25 appearances, finishing with 5 goals and 5 assists; alongside Rudy Gestede and Elvis Kamsoba, Brimmer finished as Melbourne Victory's joint top goalscorer for the 2020–21 season.

Brimmer started for the Victory in the 2021 FFA Cup Final against the Central Coast Mariners at AAMI Park on 5 February 2022. The Victory prevailed 2–1 to win the 2021 FFA Cup, achieving Brimmer's first trophy with the Victory, as well as the Victory's second FFA Cup title. Brimmer was the joint recipient of the Mark Viduka Medal along with Kye Rowles.

On 9 July 2024, Brimmer signed for Auckland FC for their inaugural A-League Men season. Brimmer was appointed vice-captain alongside Tommy Smith and club captain Hiroki Sakai.

On 2 November 2024, Brimmer scored his first goals for the club, netting twice late in a 2–0 victory in the first New Zealand Derby against Wellington Phoenix, capitalising on a mistake by Phoenix goalkeeper Josh Oluwayemi.

== International career ==
Brimmer has featured on numerous occasions for the Australian U-17 side. During the 2014 AFC U-16 Championship, he scored two goals in a 4–2 win over Japan. He was selected in the Australian squad for the 2015 FIFA U-17 World Cup.

On 29 September 2016, Brimmer was called up for the Australian U-20 side for the 2016 AFC U-19 Championship.

On 28 July 2025, Brimmer's request to switch international allegiance to Malta was approved by FIFA.

On 28 August 2025, he was called up by coach Emilio De Leo for Malta's two games in September against Lithuania and San Marino, but did not make an appearance.

== Style of play ==
Brimmer has been described as an all-action midfielder who is capable of scoring goals, and has a good habit of being in the right place at the right time. He has also been described as having a great passing range and technical ability.

== Honours ==
=== Club ===
Perth Glory

- A-League Premiership: 2018–19

Melbourne Victory

- FFA Cup: 2021

Auckland FC

- A-League Premiership: 2024–25
- A-League Men Championship: 2026

=== Individual ===
- 2018 Dylan Tombides Young Player of the Year (Football West 2018 End of Season Awards)
- Mark Viduka Medal: 2021
- A-Leagues All Star: 2022
- Johnny Warren Medal: 2021–22
- PFA A-League Team of the Season: 2021–22
- Victory Medal: 2021–22

== Personal life ==
Brimmer is of Maltese ancestry. He also holds Maltese citizenship, despite being born in Melbourne, Australia. Brimmer has two daughters. He is currently in a relationship with practicing physiotherapist Amelia Thomas. The couple were married in June 2025.

Brimmer attended Rowville Secondary College, as part of the Rowville Sports Academy Football program.
