= 2022–23 Melbourne Victory FC season =

Melbourne Victory
2022–23 season
- Chairman: Anthony Di Pietro
- Manager: Tony Popovic
- Stadium: AAMI Park
- A-League Men: 11th
- Australia Cup: Round of 32
- Top goalscorer: League: Bruno Fornaroli (7); All: Bruno Fornaroli (7)
- Highest home attendance: 23,489 vs. Melbourne City (22 October 2022); A-League Men
- Lowest home attendance: 4,392 vs. Brisbane Roar (6 January 2023); A-League Men
- Average home league attendance: 10,124
- Biggest win: 4–0 vs. Newcastle Jets (H) (4 November 2022); A-League Men
- Biggest defeat: 0–3 vs. Adelaide United (A) (11 November 2022); A-League Men
Home colours	Away colours
- All statistics correct as of 29 April 2023.

The 2022–23 season was the 18th in the history of Melbourne Victory Football Club. In addition to the domestic league, Melbourne Victory participated in the Australia Cup.

== Players ==
=== First team squad ===
As of 8 February 2023

Note: Flags indicate national team as defined under FIFA eligibility rules; some limited exceptions apply. Players may hold more than one non-FIFA nationality.

No.	Pos.	Nation	Player
1	GK	AUS	Matt Acton
2	DF	AUS	Jason Geria
3	DF	ESP	Cadete
4	MF	ESP	Rai Marchán
5	DF	FRA	Damien Da Silva
6	MF	AUS	Leigh Broxham
7	MF	AUS	Chris Ikonomidis
8	MF	AUS	Joshua Brillante (captain)
9	FW	AUS	Tomi Juric
10	FW	AUS	Bruno Fornaroli
11	FW	AUS	Ben Folami
14	DF	AUS	Connor Chapman
15	DF	AUS	George Timotheou

No.	Pos.	Nation	Player
16	DF	AUS	Stefan Nigro
17	MF	POR	Nani
18	MF	AUS	Bruce Kamau (on loan from OFI Crete)
19	FW	PAR	Fernando Romero (injury replacement, on loan from Cerro Porteño)
20	GK	AUS	Paul Izzo
21	DF	POR	Roderick (vice-captain)
22	MF	AUS	Jake Brimmer
23	MF	AUS	Nathan Konstandopoulos
24	FW	AUS	Nishan Velupillay (scholarship)
26	FW	AUS	Lleyton Brooks (scholarship)
28	MF	AUS	William Wilson
29	MF	AUS	Eli Adams (scholarship)
30	GK	AUS	Ahmad Taleb (scholarship)
31	DF	MKD	Matthew Bozinovski (scholarship)

== Transfers ==
=== Transfers in ===
No.	Position	Player	Transferred from	Type/fee	Contract length	Date	Ref.
31	DF	(North Macedonia) Matthew Bozinovski	Wellington Phoenix	End of loan	(1 year)	10 June 2022	
25	DF	Noah Smith	Unattached	Free transfer	1 year	10 June 2022	
15	DF	George Timotheou	Unattached	Free transfer	1 year	10 June 2022	
9	FW	Tomi Juric	Unattached	Free transfer	1 year	27 June 2022	
29	FW	Eli Adams	Brisbane Roar Youth	Free transfer	1 year (scholarship)	28 June 2022	
30	GK	Ahmad Taleb	Melbourne City	Free transfer	2 years (scholarship)	28 June 2022	
20	GK	Paul Izzo	Unattached	Free transfer	3 years	8 July 2022	
17	MF	(Portugal) Nani	(Italy) Venezia	Free transfer	2 years	12 July 2022	
3	MF	(Spain) Cadete	Unattached	Free transfer	1 year	22 July 2022	
23	MF	Nathan Konstandopoulos	Adelaide United	Free transfer	1 year	14 September 2022	
10	FW	Bruno Fornaroli	Unattached	Injury replacement	2 months	31 October 2022	
18	MF	Bruce Kamau	(Greece) OFI Crete	Loan	6 months	1 February 2023	
5	DF	(France) Damien Da Silva	(France) Lyon	Free transfer	1.5 years	6 February 2023	
14	DF	Connor Chapman	Brisbane Roar	Free transfer	1.5 years	7 February 2023	
19	FW	(Paraguay) Fernando Romero	(Paraguay) Cerro Porteño	Injury replacement loan	6 months	8 February 2023	

==== From youth squad ====
No.	Position	Player	Age	Notes	Ref
28	MF	William Wilson	20	1-year senior contract	

=== Transfers out ===
No.	Position	Player	Transferred to	Type/fee	Date	Ref
15	DF	Aaron Anderson	Unattached	End of contract	25 May 2022	
25	FW	Luis Lawrie-Lattanzio	Unattached	End of contract	25 May 2022	
10	FW	Robbie Kruse	Unattached	End of contract	8 June 2022	
3	DF	Jason Davidson	(Belgium) Eupen	End of contract	22 June 2022	
17	DF	Brendan Hamill	(India) ATK Mohun Bagan	Undisclosed	22 June 2022	
9	FW	(Italy) Francesco Margiotta	Unattached	End of contract	23 June 2022	
20	GK	(Croatia) Ivan Kelava	Unattached	End of contract	8 July 2022	
23	FW	(New Zealand) Marco Rojas	(Chile) Colo-Colo	End of contract	11 July 2022	
13	MF	Birkan Kirdar	Unattached	Mutual contract termination	14 September 2022	
27	DF	Zaydan Bello	Unattached	Mutual contract termination	14 September 2022	
18	FW	Nicholas D'Agostino	(Norway) Viking FK	Undisclosed	21 January 2023	
5	DF	Matthew Spiranovic	Retired		2 February 2023	
19	MF	Luka Prso	(Austria) SV Stripfing	Mutual contract termination	2 February 2023	
14	MF	Jay Barnett	Adelaide United	Mutual contract termination	7 February 2023	
25	DF	Noah Smith	Brisbane Roar	Mutual contract termination	7 February 2023	

=== Contract extensions ===
No.	Player	Position	Duration	Date	Notes
4	(Spain) Rai Marchán	Defensive midfielder	2 years	7 June 2022	
6	Leigh Broxham	Defensive midfielder	1 year	9 June 2022	
5	Matthew Spiranovic	Centre-back	1 year	22 June 2022	
2	Jason Geria	Right-back	2 years	24 June 2022	
10	Bruno Fornaroli	Forward		18 January 2023	signed on permanent basis
11	Ben Folami	Winger	2 years	8 February 2023	Contract extended from end of 2022–23 until end of 2024–25.
28	William Wilson	Central midfielder	2 years	8 February 2023	Contract extended from end of 2022–23 until end of 2024–25.
31	(North Macedonia) Matthew Bozinovski	Centre-back	1 year	8 February 2023	Contract extended from end of 2022–23 until end of 2023–24.

== Pre-season and friendlies ==
Win Draw Loss Cancelled or postponed

15 July 2022	Melbourne Victory	1–4	(England) Manchester United	Melbourne, Australia
	Ikonomidis 5'	Report	McTominay 43'; Martial 45+1'; Rashford 78'; Lupancu 90' (o.g.)	Stadium: Melbourne Cricket Ground; Attendance: 74,157

10 August 2022	Dandenong Thunder (Australia)	0–2	Melbourne Victory	Melbourne
19:30 AEST		Report	Folami 52'; Marchán 72'	Stadium: George Andrews Reserve; Referee: Adam Bavcar

24 August 2022	Northcote City (Australia)	0–7	Melbourne Victory	Melbourne
19:30 AEST		Report	Nani 6', 25'; Brillante 28'; Miranda 31'; Folami 65'; Marchán 70' (pen.); Velupillay 79'	Stadium: John Cain Memorial Park; Attendance: 1,186

31 August 2022	Rochedale Rovers (Australia)	0–7	Melbourne Victory	Brisbane
19:30 AEST		Report	Ikonomidis 3', 62', 69'; Nani 10'; D'Agostino 73'; Adams 83'; Smith 90'	Stadium: Underwood Park

4 September 2022	Brisbane Roar	1–1	Melbourne Victory	Kippa-Ring
15:00 AEST	Ivanovic 57' (pen.)	Report	D'Agostino 15'	Stadium: A.J. Kelly Park

13 September 2022	Pascoe Vale (Australia)	0–6	Melbourne Victory	Melbourne
19:30 AEST		Report	Spiranovic 8', 22'; Nani 14', 33'; Folami 55'; Minutoli 81'	Stadium: CB Smith Reserve; Attendance: 1,212; Referee: Adam Bavcar

21 September 2022	Melbourne Victory	2–3	Central Coast Mariners	Melbourne
16:00 AEST	D'Agostino 12', 26'	Report	Ruhs 4'; Ayongo 47', 53'	Stadium: Epping Stadium; Attendance: 0 (Behind closed doors)

25 September 2022	North Geelong Warriors (Australia)	0–4	Melbourne Victory	Melbourne
15:00 AEST		Report	Ikonomidis 17'; Brimmer 26', 28'; Adams 75'	Stadium: Elcho Park

29 September 2022	Newcastle Jets	1–0	Melbourne Victory	Newcastle
AEST	Dartsmelia	Report		Stadium: McDonald Jones Stadium

== Competitions ==
=== Overall record ===
Competition	First match	Last match	Starting round	Final position	Record							
Competition	First match	Last match	Starting round	Final position	Pld	W	D	L	GF	GA	GD	Win %
A-League Men	8 October 2022	29 April 2023	Matchday 1	11th	26	8	4	14	29	34	−5	30.77
Australia Cup	3 August 2022		Round of 32	Round of 32	1	0	0	1	1	2	−1	0.00
Total					27	8	4	15	30	36	−6	29.63

Last updated: 29 April 2023
Source: Soccerway

=== A-League Men ===
==== League table ====
Pos	Team	Pld	W	D	L	GF	GA	GD	Pts	Qualification
8	Brisbane Roar	26	7	9	10	26	33	−7	30	
9	Perth Glory	26	7	8	11	36	46	−10	29	Qualification for 2023 Australia Cup play-offs
10	Newcastle Jets	26	8	5	13	30	45	−15	29	Qualification for 2023 Australia Cup play-offs
11	Melbourne Victory	26	8	4	14	29	34	−5	28	Qualification for 2023 Australia Cup play-offs
12	Macarthur FC	26	7	5	14	31	48	−17	26	Qualification for AFC Cup group stage and 2023 Australia Cup play-offs (Note: Qualified to the AFC Cup as the 2022 Australia Cup winners.)

Source: A-Leagues
Rules for classification: 1) Points; 2) Goal difference; 3) Goals scored; 4) Points per game; 5) Least red cards; 6) Least yellow cards; 7) Toss of a coin in an event of a tie of two clubs.

==== Results summary ====
Overall								Home						Away					
Pld	W	D	L	GF	GA	GD	Pts	W	D	L	GF	GA	GD	W	D	L	GF	GA	GD
26	8	4	14	29	34	−5	28	5	2	6	17	14	+3	3	2	8	12	20	−8

Last updated: 29 April 2023.

==== Results by round ====
Round	1	2	3	4	5	6	7	9	10	11	12	13	14	15	16	17	18	19	20	21	22	8 (Note: Matchday 8 (vs. Melbourne City) was abandoned after 22 minutes due to player safety and resumed on 5 April 2023.)	23	24	25	26
Ground	A	H	H	A	H	A	A	A	A	H	A	A	H	H	A	H	H	A	H	H	A	H	A	H	H	A
Result	W	L	L	D	W	L	W	L	L	L	D	L	L	W	L	W	D	L	L	W	W	L	D	L	W	L
Position	1	6	8	8	5	7	6	9	11	12	12	12	12	12	12	10	12	12	12	12	11	11	12	12	10	11
Points	3	3	3	4	7	7	10	10	10	10	11	11	11	14	14	17	18	18	18	21	24	24	25	25	28	28

Updated to match(es) played on 29 April 2023. Source: Ultimate A-League
A = Away; H = Home; W = Win; D = Draw; L = Loss

==== Matches ====
8 October 2022 1	Sydney FC	2–3	Melbourne Victory	Sydney
19:45 AEDT	Mak 15'; Donachie 79'	Report	D'Agostino 31'; Ikonomidis 67'; Brillante 83'	Stadium: Allianz Stadium; Attendance: 21,840; Referee: Chris Beath

15 October 2022 2	Melbourne Victory	0–1	Western Sydney Wanderers	Melbourne
17:00 AEDT		Report	Mrčela 41'	Stadium: AAMI Park; Attendance: 18,017; Referee: Alex King

22 October 2022 3	Melbourne Victory	0–2	Melbourne City	Melbourne
19:45 AEDT		Report	Maclaren 17'; Cadete 19' (o.g.)	Stadium: AAMI Park; Attendance: 23,489; Referee: Alireza Faghani

29 October 2022 4	Brisbane Roar	0–0	Melbourne Victory	Brisbane
15:00 AEDT		Report		Stadium: Moreton Daily Stadium; Attendance: 4,873; Referee: Chris Beath

4 November 2022 5	Melbourne Victory	4–0	Newcastle Jets	Melbourne
19:45 AEDT	Brimmer 16' (pen.); Ikonomidis 50'; D'Agostino 54'; Fornaroli 89' (pen.)	Report		Stadium: AAMI Park; Attendance: 13,052; Referee: Ben Abraham

11 November 2022 6	Adelaide United	3–0	Melbourne Victory	Adelaide
19:15 ACDT	Ibusuki 37'; Goodwin 86' (pen.); Warland 90+1'	Report		Stadium: Coopers Stadium; Attendance: 13,504; Referee: Adam Kersey

Mid-season break for 2022 FIFA World Cup

11 December 2022 7	Macarthur FC	0–1	Melbourne Victory	Sydney
17:00 AEDT		Report	Folami 84'	Stadium: Campbelltown Stadium; Attendance: 3,312; Referee: Jonathan Barreiro

26 December 2022 9	Western United	1–0	Melbourne Victory	Melbourne
18:00 AEDT	Risdon 45+1'	Report		Stadium: AAMI Park; Attendance: 2,867; Referee: Tim Danaskos

31 December 2022 10	Central Coast Mariners	2–1	Melbourne Victory	Gosford
19:00 AEDT	Cummings 11', 53'	Report	Cadete 39'	Stadium: Central Coast Stadium; Attendance: 10,373; Referee: Daniel Elder

6 January 2023 11	Melbourne Victory	0–1	Brisbane Roar	Melbourne
19:45 AEDT		Report	O'Shea 73'	Stadium: AAMI Park; Attendance: 4,392; Referee: Kurt Ams

14 January 2023 12	Adelaide United	1–1	Melbourne Victory	Adelaide
19:45 AEDT	Goodwin 7'	Report	D'Agostino 49'	Stadium: Coopers Stadium; Attendance: 11,168; Referee: Shaun Evans

21 January 2023 13	Perth Glory	3–1	Melbourne Victory	Perth
22:00 AEDT	Williams 37'; Taggart 80', 87'	Report	Brillante 69'	Stadium: Macedonia Park; Attendance: 3,989; Referee: Stephen Lucas

26 January 2023 14	Melbourne Victory	1–2	Sydney FC	Melbourne
18:45 AEDT	Brimmer 26'	Report	Burgess 32'; Le Fondre 52'	Stadium: AAMI Park; Attendance: 8,181; Referee: Alireza Faghani

3 February 2023 15	Melbourne Victory	3–1	Wellington Phoenix	Melbourne
19:45 AEDT	Fornaroli 32'; Brimmer 54'; Juric 90+1'	Report	Zawada 13'	Stadium: AAMI Park; Attendance: 5,400; Referee: Adam Kersey

12 February 2023 16	Newcastle Jets	2–1	Melbourne Victory	Newcastle
15:00 AEDT	Mikeltadze 37' (pen.); * Grozos 58'	Report	Velupillay 51'	Stadium: McDonald Jones Stadium; Attendance: 5,595; Referee: Alex King

18 February 2023 17	Melbourne Victory	3–2	Melbourne City	Melbourne
19:45 AEDT	Da Silva 7'; Fornaroli 46'; Brillante 77'	Report	Leckie 24', 80'	Stadium: AAMI Park; Attendance: 18,011; Referee: Alireza Faghani

26 February 2023 18	Melbourne Victory	1–1	Adelaide United	Melbourne
Sunday 15:00 AEDT	Fornaroli 81' (pen.)	Report	Irankunda 87'	Stadium: AAMI Park; Attendance: 8,838; Referee: Chris Beath

4 March 2023 19	Sydney FC	1–0	Melbourne Victory	Sydney
17:00 AEDT	Caceres 35'; Burges (red card) 84'	Report		Stadium: Allianz Stadium; Attendance: 15,167; Referee: Alex King

13 March 2023 20	Melbourne Victory	1–2	Western United	Melbourne
18:00 AEDT	Fornaroli 50'	Report	Botic 38'; Prijović 69'	Stadium: AAMI Park; Attendance: 9,157; Referee: Adam Kersey

19 March 2023 21	Melbourne Victory	2–0	Central Coast Mariners	Melbourne
17:00 AEDT	Fornaroli 16'; Romero 56'	Report		Stadium: AAMI Park; Attendance: 5,028; Referee: Jonathon Barreiro

1 April 2023 22	Wellington Phoenix	1–2	Melbourne Victory	Wellington
13:00 AEDT	Zawada 25'	Report	Fornaroli 58'; Da Silva 76'	Stadium: Sky Stadium; Attendance: 7,032; Referee: Alireza Faghani

5 April 2023 8	Melbourne City	2–1 (Note: The Melbourne City v Melbourne Victory (17 December 2022) match was abandoned in the 22nd minute with Melbourne City leading 1–0. The match resumed on 5 April 2023 from the 21st minute, with the score resuming at 1–0 to Melbourne City and finished 2–1 to Melbourne City.)	Melbourne Victory	Melbourne
19:00 AEST	O'Neill 11', 57'	Report	Velupillay 89'	Stadium: AAMI Park; Attendance: 6,423 (Note: Attendance was recorded at 18,036 after match was abandoned at 22 minutes.); Referee: Alex King

9 April 2023 23	Melbourne Victory	0–0	Perth Glory	Melbourne
15:00 AEST		Report		Stadium: AAMI Park; Attendance: 5,012; Referee: Daniel Elder

15 April 2023 24	Western Sydney Wanderers	2–1	Melbourne Victory	Sydney
19:45 AEST	Borrello 46'; Layouni 81'	Report	Velupillay 56'	Stadium: CommBank Stadium; Attendance: 10,788; Referee: Chris Beath

23 April 2023 25	Melbourne Victory	2–1	Macarthur FC	Melbourne
15:00 AEST	Romero 3'; Brooks 90+4'	Report	Uskok 66'	Stadium: AAMI Park; Attendance: 6,012; Referee: Alireza Faghani

29 April 2023 26	Melbourne Victory	0–1	Brisbane Roar	Melbourne
19:45 AEST		Report	Courtney-Perkins 54'	Stadium: AAMI Park; Attendance: 7,019; Referee: Shaun Evans

=== Australia Cup ===
3 August 2022 Round of 32	Western United	2–1	Melbourne Victory	Melbourne
19:30	Timotheou 24' (o.g.); Wales 53'	Report	Brimmer 48'	Stadium: AAMI Park; Attendance: 3,670; Referee: Chris Beath

== Statistics ==
=== Appearances and goals ===
Includes all competitions. Players with no appearances not included in the list.

As of 29 April 2023

No.	Pos.	Nat.	Name	A-League Men		Australia Cup		Total	
No.	Pos.	Nat.	Name	Apps	Goals	Apps	Goals	Apps	Goals
1	GK	(Australia)	Matt Acton	7	0	0	0	7	0
2	DF	(Australia)	Jason Geria	14+1	0	0	0	15	0
3	DF	(Spain)	Cadete	24+1	1	0+1	0	26	1
4	DF	(Spain)	Rai Marchán	13+6	0	1	0	20	0
5	DF	(France)	Damien Da Silva	12	2	0	0	12	2
6	MF	(Australia)	Leigh Broxham	16+4	0	0+1	0	21	0
7	FW	(Australia)	Chris Ikonomidis	17+6	2	1	0	24	2
8	MF	(Australia)	Joshua Brillante	21+3	3	1	0	25	3
9	FW	(Australia)	Tomi Juric	0+6	1	0+1	0	7	1
10	FW	(Australia)	Bruno Fornaroli	18+2	7	0	0	20	7
11	FW	(Australia)	Ben Folami	19+7	1	1	0	27	1
14	MF	(Australia)	Connor Chapman	11+1	0	0	0	12	0
15	DF	(Australia)	George Timotheou	4+1	0	1	0	6	0
16	DF	(Australia)	Stefan Nigro	10+8	0	1	0	19	0
17	MF	(Portugal)	Nani	10	0	0+1	0	11	0
18	FW	(Australia)	Bruce Kamau	1+8	0	0	0	7	0
19	FW	(Paraguay)	Fernando Romero	6+4	2	0	0	10	2
20	GK	(Australia)	Paul Izzo	19	0	1	0	20	0
21	DF	(Portugal)	Roderick Miranda	20+1	0	1	0	22	0
22	MF	(Australia)	Jake Brimmer	17+1	3	1	1	19	4
23	MF	(Australia)	Nathan Konstandopoulos	0+10	0	0	0	10	0
24	FW	(Australia)	Nishan Velupillay	9+17	3	1	0	27	3
26	FW	(Australia)	Lleyton Brooks	0+12	1	0+1	0	13	1
28	MF	(Australia)	William Wilson	1+8	0	0	0	9	0
29	MF	(Australia)	Eli Adams	1+4	0	0	0	5	0
31	DF	(North Macedonia)	Matthew Bozinovski	4+1	0	0	0	5	0
46	MF	(Australia)	Jordi Valadon	1+1	0	0	0	2	0
Player(s) transferred out but featured this season
5	DF	(Australia)	Matthew Spiranovic	4	0	0	0	4	0
14	MF	(Australia)	Jay Barnett	0+4	0	1	0	5	0
18	FW	(Australia)	Nicholas D'Agostino	9+2	3	0	0	11	3
25	DF	(Australia)	Noah Smith	2+5	0	0	0	7	0

=== Disciplinary record ===
Includes all competitions. The list is sorted by squad number when total cards are equal. Players with no cards not included in the list.

As of 29 April 2023

Rank	No.	Pos.	Nat.	Name	A-League Men			Australia Cup			Total		
Rank	No.	Pos.	Nat.	Name	Booked	(yellow card) (yellow-red card)	Sent off (straight red)	Booked	(yellow card) (yellow-red card)	Sent off (straight red)	Booked	(yellow card) (yellow-red card)	Sent off (straight red)
1	21	DF	(Portugal)	Roderick Miranda	5	0	1	0	0	0	5	0	1
2	7	FW	(Australia)	Chris Ikonomidis	3	0	1	0	0	0	3	0	1
3	19	FW	(Paraguay)	Fernando Romero	2	0	1	0	0	0	2	0	1
4	8	MF	(Australia)	Joshua Brillante	3	1	0	0	0	0	3	1	0
5	3	DF	(Spain)	Cadete	5	0	0	1	0	0	6	0	0
6	4	MF	(Spain)	Rai Marchán	5	0	0	0	0	0	5	0	0
7	10	FW	(Australia)	Bruno Fornaroli	4	0	0	0	0	0	4	0	0
7	16	DF	(Australia)	Connor Chapman	4	0	0	0	0	0	4	0	0
9	6	MF	(Australia)	Leigh Broxham	3	0	0	0	0	0	3	0	0
10	5	DF	(France)	Damien Da Silva	2	0	0	0	0	0	2	0	0
10	17	MF	(Portugal)	Nani	2	0	0	0	0	0	2	0	0
10	22	MF	(Australia)	Jake Brimmer	2	0	0	0	0	0	2	0	0
13	11	FW	(Australia)	Ben Folami	1	0	0	0	0	0	1	0	0
13	14	DF	(Australia)	Stefan Nigro	1	0	0	0	0	0	1	0	0
13	18	FW	(Australia)	Bruce Kamau	1	0	0	0	0	0	1	0	0
13	20	GK	(Australia)	Paul Izzo	1	0	0	0	0	0	1	0	0
13	23	MF	(Australia)	Nathan Konstandopoulos	1	0	0	0	0	0	1	0	0
Player(s) transferred out but featured this season
1	18	FW	(Australia)	Nicholas D'Agostino	3	0	0	0	0	0	3	0	0
2	25	DF	(Australia)	Noah Smith	1	0	0	0	0	0	1	0	0
Total					46	1	3	1	0	0	47	1	3

=== Clean sheets ===
Includes all competitions. The list is sorted by squad number when total clean sheets are equal. Numbers in parentheses represent games where both goalkeepers participated and both kept a clean sheet; the number in parentheses is awarded to the goalkeeper who was substituted on, whilst a full clean sheet is awarded to the goalkeeper who was on the field at the start and end of play. Goalkeepers with no clean sheets not included in the list.

As of 29 April 2023

Rank	No.	Nat.	Goalkeeper	A-League Men	Australia Cup	Total
1	20	(Australia)	Paul Izzo	5	0	5
Total				5	0	5
