= 2023–24 Melbourne Victory FC season =

Melbourne Victory
2023–24 season
- Chairman: John Dovaston
- Manager: Tony Popovic
- Stadium: AAMI Park
- A-League Men: 3rd
- A-League Men Finals: Runners-up
- Australia Cup: Play-offs
- Top goalscorer: League: Bruno Fornaroli (18); All: Bruno Fornaroli (18)
- Highest home attendance: 20,107 vs. Melbourne City (6 April 2024); A-League Men
- Lowest home attendance: 5,442 vs. Western United (20 February 2024); A-League Men
- Average home league attendance: 12,227
- Biggest win: 3–0 vs. Sydney FC (H) (16 December 2023); A-League Men
- Biggest defeat: 3–1 vs. Central Coast Mariners (A) (25 May 2024); 2024 A-League Men Grand Final
Home colours	Away colours
- All statistics correct as of 26 May 2024.

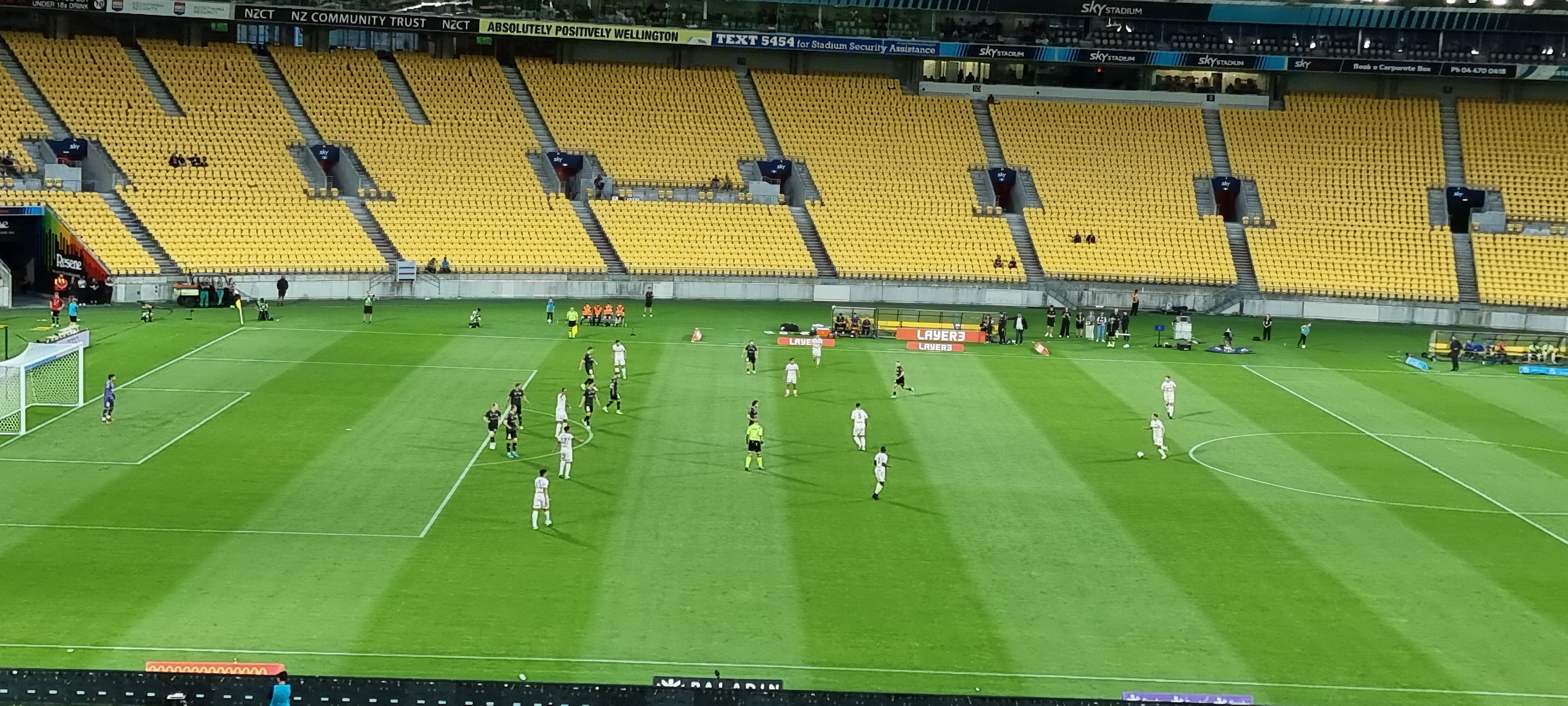
Victory playing away to Wellington Phoenix at Sky Stadium in Wellington, New Zealand on 19 January 2024.

The 2023–24 season was the 19th in the history of Melbourne Victory Football Club. In addition to the domestic league, Melbourne Victory participated in the Australia Cup.

== Players ==
=== First-team squad ===
Note: Flags indicate national team as defined under FIFA eligibility rules; some limited exceptions apply. Players may hold more than one non-FIFA nationality.

No.	Pos.	Nation	Player
2	DF	AUS	Jason Geria
3	DF	CIV	Adama Traoré
5	DF	FRA	Damien Da Silva
6	MF	AUS	Leigh Broxham
7	MF	AUS	Chris Ikonomidis
8	MF	FRA	Zinédine Machach
10	FW	AUS	Bruno Fornaroli
11	FW	AUS	Ben Folami
14	DF	AUS	Connor Chapman
15	DF	MKD	Matthew Bozinovski (scholarship)
16	DF	AUS	Stefan Nigro
17	FW	AUS	Nishan Velupillay
18	MF	AUS	Fabian Monge
19	FW	AUS	Daniel Arzani

No.	Pos.	Nation	Player
20	GK	AUS	Paul Izzo
21	DF	POR	Roderick Miranda (captain)
22	MF	AUS	Jake Brimmer
23	MF	TUN	Salim Khelifi (on loan from Perth Glory)
24	MF	AUS	Eli Adams (scholarship)
25	MF	AUS	Ryan Teague
27	MF	AUS	Jordi Valadon (scholarship)
28	MF	CUW	Roly Bonevacia
29	DF	AUS	Joshua Inserra (scholarship)
30	GK	AUS	Ahmad Taleb (scholarship)
37	FW	AUS	Kasey Bos
40	GK	AUS	Christian Siciliano

== Transfers ==
=== Transfers in ===
No.	Position	Player	Transferred from	Type/fee	Contract length	Date	Ref.
19	FW	Daniel Arzani	Macarthur FC	Free transfer	2 years	9 July 2023	
3	DF	(Ivory Coast) Adama Traoré	Unattached	Free transfer	2 years	13 July 2023	
8	MF	(France) Zinédine Machach	Unattached	Free transfer	1 year	8 August 2023	
18	MF	Fabian Monge	(Australia) APIA Leichhardt	Free transfer	1 year	4 September 2023	
25	MF	Ryan Teague	(Portugal) Famalicão	Free transfer	3 years	13 September 2023	
23	MF	(Tunisia) Salim Khelifi	Perth Glory	Loan	5 months	22 January 2024	
28	MF	(Curaçao) Roly Bonevacia	(Kuwait) Al-Tadamon	Free transfer	4 months	6 February 2024	

==== From youth squad ====
No.	Position	Player	Age	Notes	Ref
28	DF	Franco Lino	17	3-year scholarship contract	
29	DF	Joshua Inserra	18	3-year scholarship contract	
27	MF	Jordi Valadon	20	2-year scholarship contract	
40	GK	Christian Siciliano	20	1-year contract	
37	FW	Kasey Bos	19	1.5-year contract	

=== Transfers out ===
No.	Position	Player	Transferred to	Type/fee	Date	Ref
1	GK	Matt Acton	Unattached	End of contract	3 May 2023	
3	DF	(Spain) Cadete	Unattached	End of contract	3 May 2023	
9	FW	Tomi Juric	Unattached	End of contract	3 May 2023	
26	FW	Lleyton Brooks	Unattached	End of contract	3 May 2023	
18	FW	Bruce Kamau	(Greece) OFI	End of loan	25 May 2023	
19	FW	(Paraguay) Fernando Romero	(Paraguay) Cerro Porteño	End of loan	25 May 2023	
17	FW	(Portugal) Nani	Unattached	Mutual contract termination	31 May 2023	
15	DF	George Timotheou	(Australia) Gungahlin United	Mutual contract termination	30 June 2023	
8	MF	Joshua Brillante	Western Sydney Wanderers	Mutual contract termination	9 July 2023	
13	MF	William Wilson	Central Coast Mariners	Mutual contract termination	26 August 2023	
23	MF	Nathan Konstandopoulos	(Australia) Heidelberg United	Mutual contract termination	22 January 2024	
4	MF	(Spain) Rai Marchán	(Spain) Albacete Balompié	Mutual contract termination	31 January 2024	
28	DF	Franco Lino	(Norway) Viking	Undisclosed	6 February 2024	

=== Contract extensions ===
No.	Player	Position	Duration	Date	Notes
21	(Portugal) Roderick Miranda	Centre-back	2 years	15 July 2023	
6	Leigh Broxham	Defensive midfielder	1 year	10 August 2023	
24	Eli Adams	Midfielder		8 October 2023	
17	Nishan Velupillay	Winger	3 years	1 November 2023	Contract extended from end of 2023–24 until end of 2026–27.
18	Fabian Monge	Central midfielder	1 year	1 February 2024	Contract extended from end of 2023–24 until end of 2024–25.
8	(France) Zinédine Machach	Attacking midfielder	2 years	26 March 2024	Contract extended from end of 2023–24 until end of 2025–26.

== Pre-season and friendlies ==
Win Draw Loss Fixtures

15 August 2023	Altona Magic (Australia)	0–3	(Australia) Melbourne Victory	Melbourne
19:00 AEST		Report	Fornaroli 8' (pen.); Ikonomidis 88', 90' (pen.)	Stadium: Paisley Park; Referee: Shaun Evans

23 August 2023	Northcote City (Australia)	0–4	(Australia) Melbourne Victory	Melbourne
19:00 AEST		Report	Fornaroli 1', 24'; Folami 27'; Chapman 49'	Stadium: John Cain Memorial Park

30 August 2023	Dandenong City (Australia)	0–6	(Australia) Melbourne Victory	Melbourne
19:00 AEST		Report	Adams 19'; Traoré 31', 35'; Fornaroli 40'; Arzani 43' (pen.); Razmovski 49'	Stadium: John Cain Memorial Park

7 September 2023	Heidelberg United (Australia)	0–3	(Australia) Melbourne Victory	Melbourne
		Report	Fornaroli 13'; Menelaou 59'; McCluskey 70'	Attendance: 0 (behind closed doors)

20 September 2023	North Geelong Warriors (Australia)	0–3	(Australia) Melbourne Victory	Melbourne
		Report	Arzani 19'; Bos 55'; McCluskey 70'	Attendance: 0 (behind closed doors)

27 September 2023	Melbourne Victory (Australia)	0–1	(Australia) Adelaide United	Melbourne
		Report	Kitto 37'	Stadium: AAMI Park; Attendance: 0 (behind closed doors)

1 October 2023	Perth Glory (Australia)	3–1	(Australia) Melbourne Victory	Bunbury
15:00 AWST	Taggart 17'; Beevers 70'; Ivanovic 81'	Report	Brimmer 89'	Stadium: Hay Park; Attendance: ~2,000; Referee: Shane Skinner

4 October 2023	Perth Glory (Australia)	0–4	(Australia) Melbourne Victory	Perth
19:00 AWST		Report	Fornaroli 4', 35' (pen.); Velupillay 41'; Adams 90+1'	Stadium: Dorrien Gardens; Referee: Shane Skinner

14 October 2023	Melbourne Victory (Australia)	0–1	(New Zealand) Wellington Phoenix	Melbourne
		Report	Barbarouses 62'	Stadium: City Vista Recreation Reserve; Attendance: 0 (behind closed doors)

== Competitions ==
=== Overall record ===
Competition	First match	Last match	Starting round	Final position	Record							
Competition	First match	Last match	Starting round	Final position	Pld	W	D	L	GF	GA	GD	Win %
A-League Men	21 October 2023	27 April 2024	Matchday 1	3rd	27	10	12	5	43	33	+10	37.04
A-League Men Finals	5 May 2024	25 May 2024	Elimination final	Runners-up	4	1	2	1	4	5	−1	25.00
Australia Cup	17 July 2023		Play-offs	Play-offs	1	0	1	0	2	2	+0	0.00
Total					32	11	15	6	49	40	+9	34.38

Last updated: 25 May 2024
Source: Soccerway

=== A-League Men ===
==== League table ====
Pos	Team	Pld	W	D	L	GF	GA	GD	Pts	Qualification
1	Central Coast Mariners (C)	27	17	4	6	49	27	+22	55	Qualification for AFC Champions League Elite and Finals series
2	Wellington Phoenix (Note: Wellington Phoenix cannot qualify for Asian Football Confederation competitions as they are based in New Zealand, which is part of the Oceania Football Confederation.)	27	15	8	4	42	26	+16	53	Qualification for Finals series (Note: The top two teams enter the finals series at the semi-finals, while the teams ranked third to sixth enter the finals series at the elimination-finals.)
3	Melbourne Victory	27	10	12	5	43	33	+10	42	Qualification for Finals series
4	Sydney FC	27	12	5	10	52	41	+11	41	Qualification for AFC Champions League Two and Finals series (Note: Qualified for AFC Champions League Two as the 2023 Australia Cup winners.)
5	Macarthur FC	27	11	8	8	45	48	−3	41	Qualification for Finals series

Source: A-Leagues
Rules for classification: 1) points; 2) wins; 3) goal difference; 4) goals scored; 5) head-to-head results; 5a) head-to-head points; 5b) head-to-head goal difference; 6) Fair Play points; 7) away goal difference; 8) away goals per match; 9) home goal difference; 10) home goals per match; 11) toss of a coin in an event of a tie of two clubs.
(C) Champions

==== Results summary ====
Away figures include Melbourne Victory's 1–1 draw on neutral ground against Central Coast Mariners on 13 January 2024.

Overall								Home						Away					
Pld	W	D	L	GF	GA	GD	Pts	W	D	L	GF	GA	GD	W	D	L	GF	GA	GD
27	10	12	5	43	33	+10	42	6	4	3	22	15	+7	4	8	2	21	18	+3

Last updated: 27 April 2024.
Source: Ultimate A-League

==== Results by round ====
Round	1	2	3	4	5	6	7	8	9	10	11	27	13	14	15	16	17	12	18	19	20	21	22	23	24	25	26
Ground	A	H	H	H	A	A	A	H	A	H	A	N	A	H	A	H	A	H	H	A	A	A	H	H	A	H	H
Result	W	W	D	D	D	D	W	W	D	W	W	D	D	D	D	L	D	W	L	L	W	D	W	W	L	D	L
Position	2	2	2	2	5	6	4	2	2	2	1	1	2	2	3	4	4	3	3	3	3	4	3	3	3	3	3
Points	3	6	7	8	9	10	13	16	17	20	23	24	25	26	27	27	28	31	31	31	34	35	38	41	41	42	42

Updated to match(es) played on 27 April 2024. Source: Ultimate A-League
A = Away; H = Home; N = Neutral; W = Win; D = Draw; L = Loss

==== Matches ====
Win Draw Loss Fixtures

21 October 2023 1	Sydney FC	0–2	Melbourne Victory	Sydney
19:45 AEDT		Report	Fornaroli 62'; Machach 86'	Stadium: Allianz Stadium; Attendance: 14,586; Referee: Daniel Elder

29 October 2023 2	Melbourne Victory	5–3	Newcastle Jets	Melbourne
17:00 AEDT	Fornaroli 8', 31', 40' (pen.), 45+3'; Velupillay 55'	Report	Natta 6'; Taylor 49', 74'	Stadium: AAMI Park; Attendance: 13,663; Referee: Jonathon Barreiro

4 November 2023 3	Melbourne Victory	1–1	Adelaide United	Melbourne
19:45 AEDT	Fornaroli 28'	Report	Ibuski 59'	Stadium: AAMI Park; Attendance: 15,229; Referee: Alex King

10 November 2023 4	Melbourne Victory	1–1	Wellington Phoenix	Melbourne
19:45 AEDT	Teague 14'	Report	Da Silva 41' (o.g.)	Stadium: AAMI Park; Attendance: 10,583; Referee: Shaun Evans

24 November 2023 5	Macarthur FC	1–1	Melbourne Victory	Sydney
19:45 AEDT	Millar 12'	Report	Nicolaou 90+5' (o.g.)	Stadium: Campbelltown Stadium; Attendance: 2,984; Referee: Alireza Faghani

3 December 2023 6	Central Coast Mariners	2–2	Melbourne Victory	Gosford
15:00 AEDT	Kuol 16'; Torres 73'	Report	Fornaroli 46'; Velupillay 52'	Stadium: Industree Group Stadium; Attendance: 5,193; Referee: Alex King

10 December 2023 7	Western Sydney Wanderers	3–4	Melbourne Victory	Sydney
17:00 AEDT	Antonsson 57' (pen.), 88'; Yuel 90+1'	Report	Fornaroli 8', 46', 51' (pen.), 74'	Stadium: CommBank Stadium; Attendance: 9,755; Referee: Ben Abraham

16 December 2023 8	Melbourne Victory	3–0	Sydney FC	Melbourne
19:45 AEDT	Arzani 20'; Machach 24'; Fornaroli 57'	Report		Stadium: AAMI Park; Attendance: 14,607; Referee: Adam Kersey

23 December 2023 9	Melbourne City	0–0	Melbourne Victory	Melbourne
19:45 AEDT		Report		Stadium: AAMI Park; Attendance: 25,884; Referee: Alireza Faghani

30 December 2023 10	Melbourne Victory	2–0	Adelaide United	Melbourne
19:45 AEDT	Machach 73'; Fornaroli 90'	Report		Stadium: AAMI Park; Attendance: 15,216; Referee: Daniel Elder

6 January 2024 11	Perth Glory	2–3	Melbourne Victory	Perth
18:45 AWST	Taggart 20'; Majekodunmi 89'	Report	Machach 42'; Adams 82'; Folami 90+6'	Stadium: HBF Park; Attendance: 6,120; Referee: Lachlan Keevers

13 January 2024 27	Central Coast Mariners	1–1	Melbourne Victory	Sydney
17:15 AEDT	Reec 89'	Report	Arzani 33' (pen.)	Stadium: Allianz Stadium; Attendance: 8,147; Referee: Ben Abraham

19 January 2024 13	Wellington Phoenix	1–1	Melbourne Victory	Wellington
19:00 NZDT	Rufer 90+5'	Report	Chapman 79'	Stadium: Sky Stadium; Attendance: 9,139; Referee: Daniel Elder

26 January 2024 14	Melbourne Victory	1–1	Sydney FC	Melbourne
19:45 AEDT	Machach 17'	Report	Courtney-Perkins 10'	Stadium: AAMI Park; Attendance: 18,102; Referee: Adam Kersey

3 February 2024 15	Newcastle Jets	1–1	Melbourne Victory	Newcastle
18:00 AEDT	Stamatelopoulos 88'	Report	Miranda 20'	Stadium: McDonald Jones Stadium; Attendance: 5,930; Referee: Jonathon Barreiro

10 February 2024 16	Melbourne Victory	0–1	Macarthur FC	Melbourne
17:30 AEDT		Report	Hollman 21'	Stadium: AAMI Park; Attendance: 10,737; Referee: Tim Danaskos

17 February 2024 17	Melbourne City	0–0	Melbourne Victory	Melbourne
19:45 AEDT		Report		Stadium: AAMI Park; Attendance: 20,877; Referee: Alireza Faghani

20 February 2024 12	Melbourne Victory	2–1	Western United	Melbourne
19:00 AEDT	Da Silva 90+5', 90+9'	Report	Penha 60'	Stadium: AAMI Park; Attendance: 5,442; Referee: Jonathon Barreiro

25 February 2024 18	Melbourne Victory	0–1	Central Coast Mariners	Melbourne
17:00 AEDT		Report	Teague 48' (o.g.)	Stadium: AAMI Park; Attendance: 10,203; Referee: Tim Danaskos

3 March 2024 19	Brisbane Roar	3–2	Melbourne Victory	Brisbane
16:00 AEST	Rojas 23', 56'; Waddingham 70'	Report	Machach 35'; Bonevacia 86'	Stadium: Suncorp Stadium; Attendance: 6,184; Referee: Daniel Elder

9 March 2024 20	Adelaide United	1–2	Melbourne Victory	Adelaide
19:15 ACDT	Irankunda 51'	Report	Fornaroli 33', 57' (pen.)	Stadium: Coopers Stadium; Attendance: 8,731; Referee: Alireza Faghani

14 March 2024 21	Western United	2–2	Melbourne Victory	Melbourne
19:00 AEDT	Penha 43'; Garuccio 90'	Report	Folami 70'; Ikonomidis 79'	Stadium: AAMI Park; Attendance: 3,058; Referee: Shane Skinner

31 March 2024 22	Melbourne Victory	2–1	Perth Glory	Melbourne
15:00 AEDT	Fornaroli 16', 53'	Report	Bennie 61'	Stadium: AAMI Park; Attendance: 6,223; Referee: Ben Abraham

6 April 2024 23	Melbourne Victory	2–1	Melbourne City	Melbourne
19:45 AEDT	Fornaroli 34' (pen.); Da Silva 86'	Report	Arslan 4'	Stadium: AAMI Park; Attendance: 20,107; Referee: Alireza Faghani

12 April 2024 24	Wellington Phoenix	1–0	Melbourne Victory	Wellington
19:00 NZDT	Miranda 90+5' (o.g.)	Report		Stadium: Sky Stadium; Attendance: 6,360; Referee: Daniel Elder

20 April 2024 25	Melbourne Victory	0–0	Brisbane Roar	Melbourne
17:30 AEST		Report		Stadium: AAMI Park; Attendance: 8,202; Referee: Jack Morgan

27 April 2024 26	Melbourne Victory	3–4	Western Sydney Wanderers	Melbourne
19:45 AEST	Machach 4'; Arzani 15', 55'	Report	Brook 20'; Milanovic 35'; Hammond 73'; Priestman 87'	Stadium: AAMI Park; Attendance: 10,723; Referee: Alireza Faghani

==== Finals series ====
5 May 2024 Elimination-final	Melbourne Victory	1–1 (a.e.t.) (3–2 p)	Melbourne City	Melbourne
17:00 AEST	Velupillay 88'	Report	Souprayen 29'	Stadium: AAMI Park; Attendance: 21,358; Referee: Alex King
	Penalties
	Miranda (penalty scored); Da Silva (penalty scored); Izzo (penalty scored); Broxham (penalty missed)		(penalty scored) Natel; (penalty missed) Antonis; (penalty missed) Talbot; (penalty scored) Caputo; (penalty missed) Jeggo

12 May 2024 Semi final	Melbourne Victory	0–0	Wellington Phoenix	Melbourne
16:00 AEST		Report		Stadium: AAMI Park; Attendance: 16,313; Referee: Adam Kersey

18 May 2024 Semi final	Wellington Phoenix	1–2 (a.e.t.) (1–2 agg.)	Melbourne Victory	Wellington
18:30 NZST	Zawada 90+9'	Report	Traoré 82'; Ikonomidis 102'	Stadium: Sky Stadium; Attendance: 33,297; Referee: Daniel Elder

25 May 2024 Grand Final	Central Coast Mariners	3–1 (a.e.t.)	Melbourne Victory	Gosford
19:45 AEST	Edmondson 90+1', 120+1'; Di Pizio 97'	Source	Geria 50'	Stadium: Industree Group Stadium; Attendance: 21,379; Referee: Alex King

=== Australia Cup ===
Win Draw Loss

17 July 2023 Play-offs	Newcastle Jets	2–2 (a.e.t.) (4–2 p)	Melbourne Victory	Darwin
19:00 ACST	Buhagiar 18'; Goodwin 70'	Report	Velupillay 90+2'; Wilson 90+7'	Stadium: Larrakia Park; Attendance: 2,105; Referee: Jack Morgan
	Penalties
	Goodwin (penalty scored); Stynes (penalty missed); Timmins (penalty scored); Jenkinson (penalty scored); Cancar (penalty scored)		(penalty scored) Folami; (penalty missed) Wilson; (penalty scored) Velupillay; (penalty missed) Valadon

== Statistics ==
=== Appearances and goals ===
Includes all competitions. Players with no appearances not included in the list.

As of 25 May 2024

No.	Pos.	Nat.	Name	A-League Men		A-League Men Finals		Australia Cup		Total	
No.	Pos.	Nat.	Name	Apps	Goals	Apps	Goals	Apps	Goals	Apps	Goals
2	DF	(Australia)	Jason Geria	21+3	0	4	1	0	0	28	1
3	DF	(Ivory Coast)	Adama Traoré	17+2	0	4	1	0	0	23	1
5	DF	(France)	Damien Da Silva	26	2	4	0	0	0	30	2
6	MF	(Australia)	Leigh Broxham	0+4	0	0+1	0	0	0	5	0
7	FW	(Australia)	Chris Ikonomidis	6+19	1	0+4	1	0	0	29	2
8	MF	(France)	Zinédine Machach	26+1	7	2	0	0	0	29	7
10	FW	(Australia)	Bruno Fornaroli	21	18	4	0	0	0	25	18
11	FW	(Australia)	Ben Folami	11+15	2	1+3	0	0+1	0	31	2
14	DF	(Australia)	Connor Chapman	15+11	1	0+2	0	0	0	28	1
15	DF	(North Macedonia)	Matthew Bozinovski	0	0	0	0	1	0	1	0
16	DF	(Australia)	Stefan Nigro	3+5	0	0	0	1	0	9	0
17	FW	(Australia)	Nishan Velupillay	15+9	2	2+1	1	0+1	1	28	4
18	MF	(Australia)	Fabian Monge	12+4	0	0	0	0	0	16	0
19	FW	(Australia)	Daniel Arzani	23+4	4	3+1	0	0	0	31	4
20	GK	(Australia)	Paul Izzo	27	0	4	0	0	0	31	0
21	DF	(Portugal)	Roderick Miranda	25	1	4	0	0	0	29	1
22	MF	(Australia)	Jake Brimmer	17+7	0	1+3	0	0	0	28	0
23	MF	(Tunisia)	Salim Khelifi	4+8	0	2+2	0	0	0	16	0
24	MF	(Australia)	Eli Adams	1+9	1	0	0	1	0	11	1
25	MF	(Australia)	Ryan Teague	20+2	1	4	0	0	0	26	1
27	MF	(Australia)	Jordi Valadon	1+10	0	3+1	0	1	0	16	0
28	MF	(Curaçao)	Roly Bonevacia	1+7	1	2+1	0	0	0	11	1
29	DF	(Australia)	Joshua Inserra	0+1	0	0	0	1	0	2	0
30	GK	(Australia)	Ahmad Taleb	0	0	0	0	1	0	1	0
35	MF	(Australia)	Alexander Menelaou	0	0	0	0	1	0	1	0
37	FW	(Australia)	Kasey Bos	0+2	0	0+2	0	1	0	5	0
37	MF	(Australia)	Kayne Razmovski	0	0	0	0	0+1	0	1	0
41	FW	(Australia)	Adem Duratovic	0	0	0	0	1	0	1	0
Player(s) transferred out but featured this season
4	MF	(Spain)	Rai Marchán	4+6	0	0	0	0	0	10	0
13	MF	(Australia)	William Wilson	0	0	0	0	0+1	1	1	1
23	MF	(Australia)	Nathan Konstandopoulos	0	0	0	0	1	0	1	0
28	DF	(Australia)	Franco Lino	1+5	0	0	0	1	0	7	0
33	DF	(Australia)	Ryan Lethlean	0	0	0	0	0+1	0	1	0
48	FW	(Australia)	Timothy Atherinos	0	0	0	0	0+1	0	1	0

=== Disciplinary record ===
Includes all competitions. The list is sorted by squad number when total cards are equal. Players with no cards not included in the list.

As of 25 May 2024

Rank	No.	Pos.	Nat.	Name	A-League Men			A-League Men Finals			Australia Cup			Total		
Rank	No.	Pos.	Nat.	Name	Yellow card	(yellow card) (yellow-red card)	Red card	Yellow card	(yellow card) (yellow-red card)	Red card	Yellow card	(yellow card) (yellow-red card)	Red card	Yellow card	(yellow card) (yellow-red card)	Red card
1	8	MF	(France)	Zinédine Machach	5	0	0	0	0	1	0	0	0	5	0	1
2	27	MF	(Australia)	Jordi Valadon	0	0	1	0	0	0	0	0	0	0	0	1
3	2	DF	(Australia)	Jason Geria	4	0	1	0	0	0	0	0	0	4	0	1
4	21	DF	(Portugal)	Roderick Miranda	6	2	0	0	0	0	0	0	0	6	2	0
5	3	DF	(Ivory Coast)	Adama Traoré	2	1	0	1	0	0	0	0	0	3	1	0
6	5	DF	(France)	Damien Da Silva	5	0	0	2	0	0	0	0	0	7	0	0
6	19	FW	(Australia)	Daniel Arzani	3	0	0	4	0	0	0	0	0	7	0	0
8	10	FW	(Australia)	Bruno Fornaroli	4	0	0	1	0	0	0	0	0	5	0	0
8	14	DF	(Australia)	Connor Chapman	3	0	0	1	0	0	0	0	0	4	0	0
10	7	FW	(Australia)	Chris Ikonomidis	3	0	0	0	0	0	0	0	0	3	0	0
10	17	FW	(Australia)	Nishan Velupillay	3	0	0	0	0	0	0	0	0	3	0	0
10	18	MF	(Australia)	Fabian Monge	3	0	0	0	0	0	0	0	0	3	0	0
13	20	GK	(Australia)	Paul Izzo	2	0	0	0	0	0	0	0	0	2	0	0
14	11	FW	(Australia)	Ben Folami	1	0	0	0	0	0	0	0	0	1	0	0
14	22	MF	(Australia)	Jake Brimmer	1	0	0	0	0	0	0	0	0	1	0	0
14	23	MF	(Tunisia)	Salim Khelifi	1	0	0	0	0	0	0	0	0	1	0	0
14	24	MF	(Australia)	Eli Adams	1	0	0	0	0	0	0	0	0	1	0	0
14	25	MF	(Australia)	Ryan Teague	1	0	0	0	0	0	0	0	0	1	0	0
14	41	FW	(Australia)	Adem Duratovic	0	0	0	0	0	0	1	0	0	1	0	0
Player(s) transferred out but featured this season
1	4	MF	(Spain)	Rai Marchán	3	0	0	0	0	0	0	0	0	3	0	0
Total					51	3	2	9	0	1	1	0	0	61	3	2

=== Clean sheets ===
Includes all competitions. The list is sorted by squad number when total clean sheets are equal. Numbers in parentheses represent games where both goalkeepers participated and both kept a clean sheet; the number in parentheses is awarded to the goalkeeper who was substituted on, whilst a full clean sheet is awarded to the goalkeeper who was on the field at the start of play. Goalkeepers with no clean sheets not included in the list.

As of 25 May 2024

Rank	No.	Nat.	Goalkeeper	A-League Men	A-League Men Finals	Australia Cup	Total
1	20	(Australia)	Paul Izzo	5	1	0	6
Total				5	1	0	6

== See also ==
- 2023–24 Melbourne Victory FC (A-League Women) season
