= Melbourne City FC v Melbourne Victory FC (17 December 2022) =

Melbourne City v Melbourne Victory (17 December 2022)
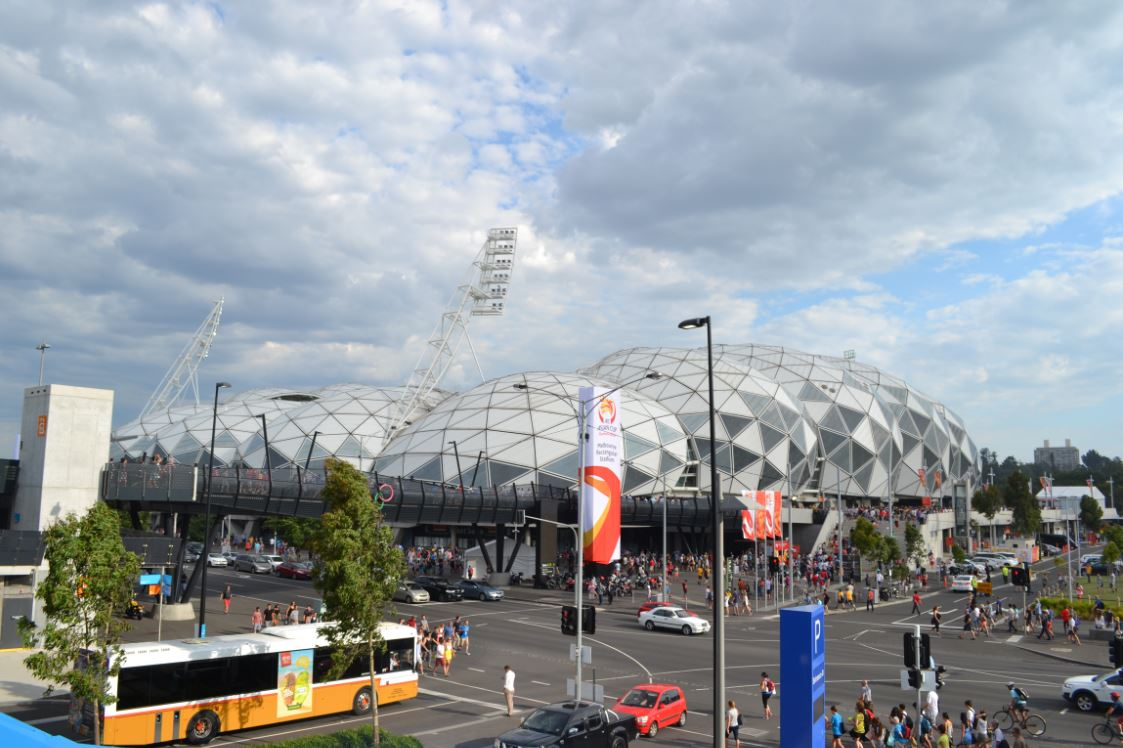
- The Melbourne Rectangular Stadium hosted the match
- Event: 2022–23 A-League Men; Round 8
Melbourne City	Melbourne Victory
2	1
- Match abandoned at 1–0 after 22 minutes Resumed on 5 April 2023
- Date: 17 December 2022
- Venue: Melbourne Rectangular Stadium, Melbourne
- Referee: Alex King (Australia)
- Attendance: 18,036

A Melbourne Derby match during the 2022–23 A-League Men soccer season took place between Melbourne City and Melbourne Victory on 17 December 2022 at the Melbourne Rectangular Stadium, in Melbourne, Australia. The match was abandoned in the 22nd minute after several incidents of hooliganism took place both on and off the field - this was the first time in A-League history in which a match was abandoned.

Throughout the match, supporters of both teams both ignited and threw flares. In the 20th minute, the match was interrupted due to flares being ignited and thrown onto the pitch, two of which had been thrown by Melbourne Victory supporters. Conflict arose when Melbourne City goalkeeper Tom Glover, who was defending the goal in front of the Melbourne Victory supporters end, picked up and threw the flares away from the pitch, the second of which was thrown into the crowd of Victory supporters. This sparked a pitch invasion by between 100–200 spectators, who proceeded to attack Glover and match referee Alex King, both of whom sustained minor injuries. The match was stopped after these incidents, and eventually ruled as a postponement to be played later.

On 23 December, Football Australia handed down interim sanctions on both clubs while a full investigation was being conducted. Both teams had their active supporter bays closed, with Melbourne Victory further sanctioned with supporter restrictions: travelling support was banned for away games, while home games were restricted to only valid club members.

The match was resumed on 5 April 2023 from the 21st minute with Melbourne City winning 1–0. The match ended 2–1 with Melbourne City's Aiden O'Neill scoring another goal before Melbourne Victory scored a consolation goal by Nishan Velupillay.

== Background ==
The match was the 40th Melbourne Derby to be played since the derby's inception in 2010. The match was the second of three scheduled Melbourne Derbies to be played that season, with Melbourne City being the designated home team for this match; the previous derby, a designated Melbourne Victory home game, ended in a 2-0 victory to Melbourne City.

On 12 December 2022, just a few days before the derby, the Australian Professional Leagues announced an agreement with Destination NSW that would see the 2023, 2024, and 2025 A-League Men Grand Finals hosted in Sydney, as opposed to the traditional format of being hosted by the finalist that finished higher during the regular season. This announcement was met with widespread opposition from fans, former players and active support groups, with Original Style Melbourne and Melbourne City Terrace, the active supporter groups of Melbourne Victory and Melbourne City respectively, agreeing to stage a walkout in the 20th minute of the Melbourne Derby on 17 December 2022 in order to protest against the APL's decision.

== Match ==
=== Events ===
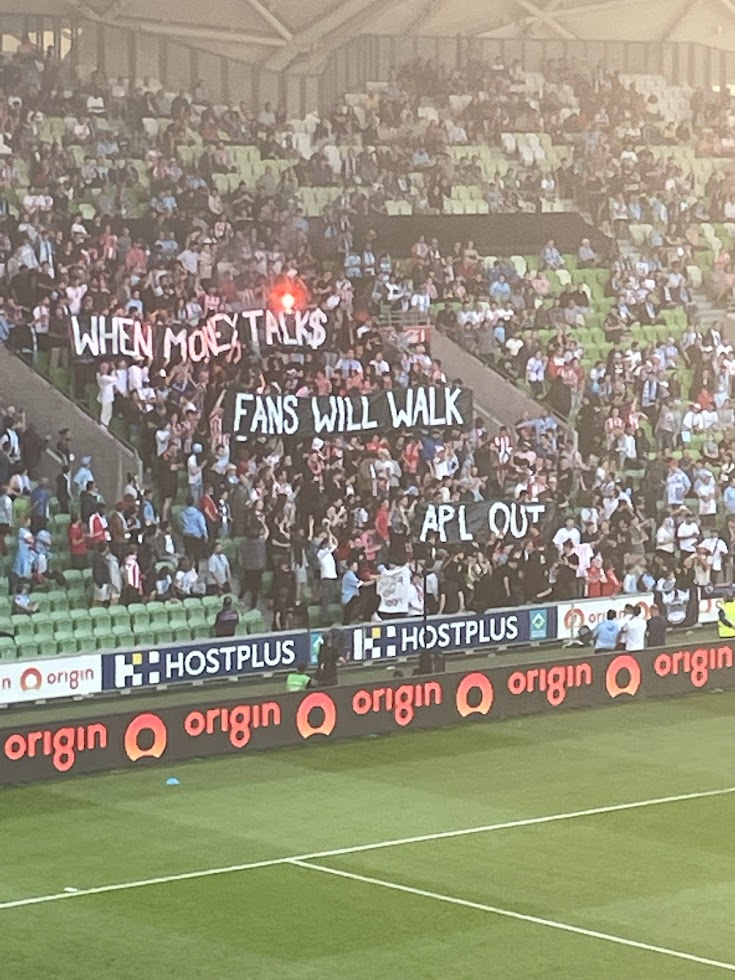
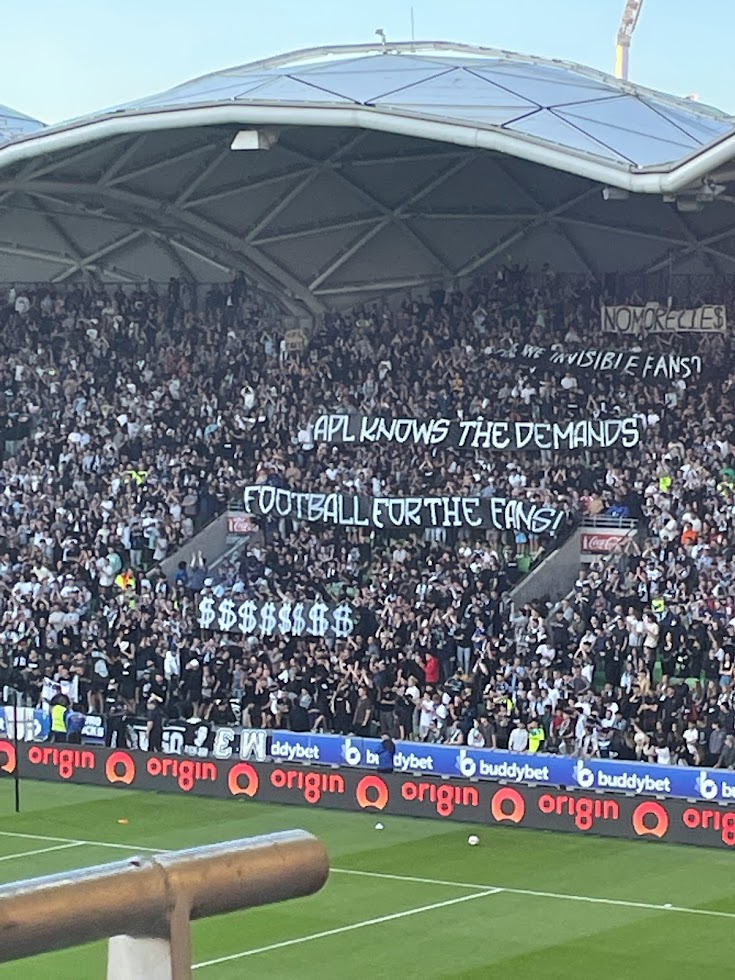
Active supports City Terrace and Original Style Melbourne protesting the decision by Australian Professional Leagues for giving A-Leagues Grand Final hosting rights to Sydney for the next three seasons in the 20th minute.

Before the game started, supporters of both teams chanted against the APL's decision to award A-League Grand Final hosting rights to Sydney for the next three years, as well as displaying banners criticising the decision in the 20th minute. Throughout the match, supporters of both teams ignited flares, some of which were thrown on the pitch. Additionally, firecrackers were exploded.

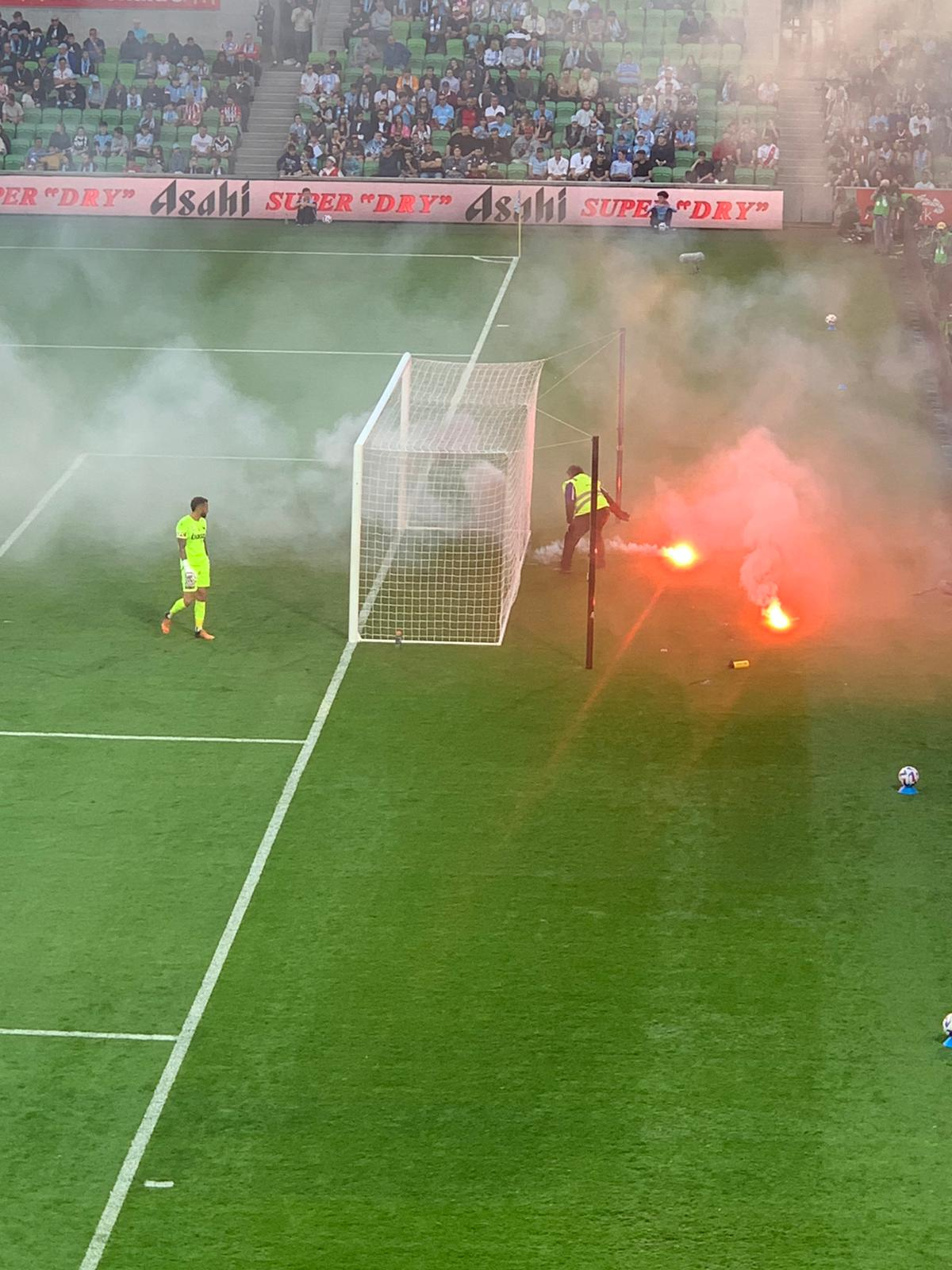
Flares on the pitch at Melbourne Victory's goalkeeper Paul Izzo's end.

In the 20th minute of the match, referee Alex King suspended the game due to flares being thrown onto the pitch. Two of the flares had been thrown by Melbourne Victory supporters. Melbourne City goalkeeper Tom Glover, who was defending the goal in front of the Melbourne Victory supporters end, picked up and threw the flares away from the pitch, the second of which was thrown into the crowd of Victory supporters. This sparked a pitch invasion by between 100–200 spectators, during which a metal bucket of sand, which had been used by match officials in order to extinguish ignited flares, was thrown by a pitch invader at Glover, which resulted in Glover sustaining a concussion and a cut to the face. Additionally, referee Alex King, a TV cameraman and two security guards were all injured in the melee. Players and coaches from both teams were ordered off the field, while pitch stewards and staff attempted to shield the players and staff from the pitch invaders. After a lengthy delay, the game was finally abandoned at 1–0, with players from both teams being physically and psychologically affected.

The pitch invasion, as it took place

According to Victoria Police, about $150,000 worth of damage was caused to the stadium during the match, and about 80 flares or fireworks were set off.

==== Match details (17 December 2022) ====
17 December 2022
19:45 AEDT

Melbourne City FC	1–0 Match abandoned in the 22nd minute	Melbourne Victory FC
O'Neill 11'

AAMI Park, Melbourne
Attendance: 18,036
Referee: Alex King (Australia)

Melbourne City	Melbourne Victory

GK	1	(Australia) Tom Glover
RB	25	(Australia) Callum Talbot
CB	6	(Finland) Thomas Lam
CB	22	(Australia) Curtis Good
LB	38	(Australia) Jordan Bos
CM	13	(Australia) Aiden O'Neill
AM	8	(Netherlands) Richard van der Venne
CM	14	(Kosovo) Valon Berisha
LM	23	(Australia) Marco Tilio
RM	7	(Australia) Mathew Leckie
CF	9	(Australia) Jamie Maclaren (c)
Manager:
(Australia) Rado Vidošić

GK	20	(Australia) Paul Izzo
RB	2	(Australia) Jason Geria
CB	6	(Australia) Leigh Broxham (c)
CB	15	(Australia) George Timotheou
LB	3	(Spain) Cadete
DM	4	(Spain) Rai Marchán
CM	22	(Australia) Jake Brimmer
AM	7	(Australia) Chris Ikonomidis
RM	7	(Australia) Nicholas D'Agostino
LM	17	(Portugal) Nani
CF	10	(Australia) Bruno Fornaroli
Manager:
(Australia) Tony Popovic

Assistant referees:
Andrew Lindsay (Australia)
David Walsh (Australia)
Fourth official:
Lachlan Keevers (Australia)
Video Assistant Referee:
Kurt Ams (Australia)
Assistant Video Assistant Referee:
Lara Lee (Australia)

Match rules

- 90 minutes.

=== Resumption ===
As the result was not awarded to Melbourne City as a forfeit, it meant the match would be resumed or replayed at a later date. The decision was made to restart the game from the point of the abandonment, the 22nd minute and score at 1–0 to Melbourne City to be played on 5 April 2023. Multiple players in the squads at the time of the abandonment were impacted by later injuries or transfers and would require a substitution to be made at the restart of play.

For Melbourne City Richard van der Venne and Matthew Leckie were both injured in subsequent matches. Scott Jamieson, a Melbourne City substitute and club captain was red carded in the match prior to the resumed fixture but was cleared by the league to take part in the game despite a suspension being handed down. Taras Gomulka was on the bench for City but left the club to join Brisbane Roar in the January transfer window.

For Melbourne Victory their marquee player Nani suffered an anterior cruciate ligament injury in January, Jake Brimmer a left knee meniscus injury, substitute Matthew Bozinovski was injured in a training game in late February and Nicholas D'Agostino was transferred from Victory to Norwegian side Viking.

On match day it was revealed that both teams would be allowed to make a new squad for the game from scratch. This resulted in Victory adding Fernando Romero to the new restarting line-up despite Romero having only joined Melbourne Victory weeks after the initial 21 minutes were played.

Aiden O'Neill scored in the 57th minute of the game, 108 days after his goal in the first match to give Melbourne City a 2-0 lead. Nishan Velupillay scored in the 89th minute from a Bruce Kamau assist to pull it back to 2-1, but Victory were unable to equalise. The match ended with Tom Glover, the City goalkeeper who had been attacked by Victory fans which caused the abandonment on the original date, holding the ball after he claimed a 94th minute corner kick to Victory.

Statistical oddities arising due to the postponement included O'Neill taking 108 days between his first and second goal, Rai Marchan coming on as a substitute for Melbourne Victory despite having started the game in December, Bruce Kamau and Fernando Romero making what could be said to be their club debuts despite both having played before the restarted fixture and both having joined the club after the match begun.

==== Match details (5 April 2023) ====
5 April 2023
19:00 AEST

Melbourne City	2–1 Match resumed at the 22nd minute	Melbourne Victory
O'Neill 11', 57'	Report	Velupillay 89'

AAMI Park, Melbourne
Attendance: 6,423
Referee: Alex King (Australia)

Melbourne City	Melbourne Victory

GK	1	(Australia) Tom Glover
RB	25	(Australia) Callum Talbot
CB	6	(Finland) Thomas Lam
CB	22	(Australia) Curtis Good
LB	38	(Australia) Jordan Bos
DM	13	(Australia) Aiden O'Neill
CM	8	(France) Florin Berenguer	(substituted off) 88'
CM	14	(Kosovo) Valon Berisha
RM	7	(Australia) Andrew Nabbout
LM	23	(Australia) Marco Tilio	(substituted off) 90+4'
CF	9	(Australia) Jamie Maclaren (c)
Substitutes:
DF	2	(Australia) Scott Galloway	(substituted on) 90+4'
DF	3	(Australia) Scott Jamieson	(substituted on) 88'
Manager:
(Australia) Rado Vidošić

GK	20	(Australia) Paul Izzo
RB	16	(Australia) Stefan Nigro
CB	5	(France) Damien Da Silva
CB	21	(Portugal) Roderick Miranda
LB	3	(Spain) Cadete
DM	14	(Australia) Connor Chapman	(substituted off) 67'
DM	8	(Australia) Josh Brillante (c)
RM	11	(Australia) Ben Folami	(substituted off) 66'
LM	7	(Australia) Chris Ikonomidis	(substituted off) 73'
CF	19	(Paraguay) Fernando Romero	(substituted off) 67'
CF	10	(Australia) Bruno Fornaroli
Substitutes:
MF	4	(Spain) Rai Marchán	(substituted on) 67'
FW	18	(Australia) Bruce Kamau	(substituted on) 73'
FW	26	(Australia) Lleyton Brooks	(substituted on) 66'
FW	24	(Australia) Nishan Velupillay	(substituted on) 67'
Manager:
(Australia) Tony Popovic

Assistant referees:
Kearney Robinson (Australia)
Daniel Illievski (Australia)
Fourth official:
Lachlan Keevers (Australia)
Video assistant referee:
Kurt Ams (Australia)
Assistant video assistant referee:
Kris Griffiths-Jones (Australia)

Match rules

- 90 minutes
- No extra time or penalties
- Seven named substitutes, of which five may be used
- Teams allowed to reconstitute their match day squad for resumption of play.

== Reactions ==
The pitch invasion, and the violence instigated against Tom Glover, Alex King and matchday officials and staff, were widely condemned by both past and present players, coaches and commentators. Melbourne Victory released a statement apologising to Tom Glover, Alex King and the TV cameraman for the injuries they sustained, condemning the actions of spectators who entered the pitch, and affirming that their actions are not acceptable under any circumstance and have no place in football. Football Australia issued a statement condemning the actions of the pitch invaders, saying that "such behaviour has no place in Australian Football", with the organisation committing to "a full investigation to commence immediately, where strong sanctions will be handed down".

== Disciplinary proceedings ==
On 19 December 2022, Football Australia issued Melbourne Victory with a show cause notice, giving them until 9am Wednesday 21 December to justify why the club should not face serious sanctions for bringing the game into disrepute through the conduct of its supporters. Possible penalties that the Victory faced included financial penalties, loss of competition points and/or playing matches behind closed doors, or on neutral territory.

On 21 December 2022, Football Australia announced that it was issuing life bans to two supporters, a 23-year-old man from Craigieburn and a 19-year-old man from Meadow Heights, through their perpetration of offences including entering the field of play without authorisation, engaging in conduct that did or was likely to cause harm or endanger others, and through using an item (bucket) with the intent to cause damage or harm. This lifetime ban covers all football-related activity in Australia including attending Football Australia-sanctioned football matches and events including all A-Leagues, Australia Cup, National Premier League, and National Team matches and registering as a football participant. Additionally, the two men could potentially face various criminal charges including violent disorder, alleged assault, possession of a flare, discharging missiles, entry to sporting competition space, disrupting a match, public nuisance, riotous behaviour, and discharge and possession of flares.

On 22 December 2022, Football Australia announced that it was issuing further bans to 8 spectators, aged between 18 and 28 years old, over their involvement in the events of the Derby, with the spectators' bans spanning five years to twenty years. The violations which led to the imposition of these bans included entering the field of play without authorisation, engaging in conduct that did or was likely to cause harm or endanger others, engaging in conduct that did or was likely to cause unlawful damage to the venue or the various forms of infrastructure within the venue, and throwing projectiles and/or missiles in a dangerous manner.

On 23 December 2022, Football Australia imposed interim restrictions on Melbourne Victory, which included the closure of active supporter areas, banning away support at Victory away matches, and restricting attendance at Victory home matches to only valid club members.

On 10 January 2023, Football Australia found that Melbourne Victory, through the actions of their supporters in the abandoned Derby, had brought the game into disrepute, and handed down a number of financial and logistical sanctions:

- A total financial sanction of $550,000 AUD, comprising $450,000 in fines and damages and $100,000 in lost revenue from the imposition of sporting sanctions
- No organised seating for away fans for the remainder of the season and finals series.
- No organised home active support for the remainder of the season and finals series.
- A suspended 10 point deduction triggered for each instance of serious supporter misconduct for the remainder of the season and the next three seasons, ending at the conclusion of 2025/26 A-League season.

The impositions of the interim and final sanctions had a profound impact on attendance at Victory home matches for the 2022-23 season; after averaging 18,186 across their home games prior to the December Derby, the Victory's average home attendances plummeted to 8,332 attendees across their home matches played after the December Derby.

== Legal proceedings ==
On 29 August 2023 the so-called "Bucket Man", Alex Agelopoulos, who invaded the pitch to throw the metal bucket at Tom Glover, pleaded guilty to a charge of violent disorder and entering a competition space without a reasonable excuse. He was sentenced to three months jail by Magistrate Rosemary Falla. He was released on bail pending appeal.

In December 2023, Agelopoulos' three month prison sentence was overturned by the County Court, after his lawyer successfully argued it was unfair that his client was ordered to go to prison, when other violent pitch invaders who entered the AAMI Park playing arena were spared jail. Agelopoulos was resentenced to a 42-month community corrections order that will require him to do at least 250 hours of unpaid community work, as well as supervision and treatment for his drug and alcohol dependency.

== See also ==
- Violence in sports
- List of violent spectator incidents in sports
- Pitch invasion
- Football hooliganism
