= A-Leagues Club Championship =

Australian soccer trophy

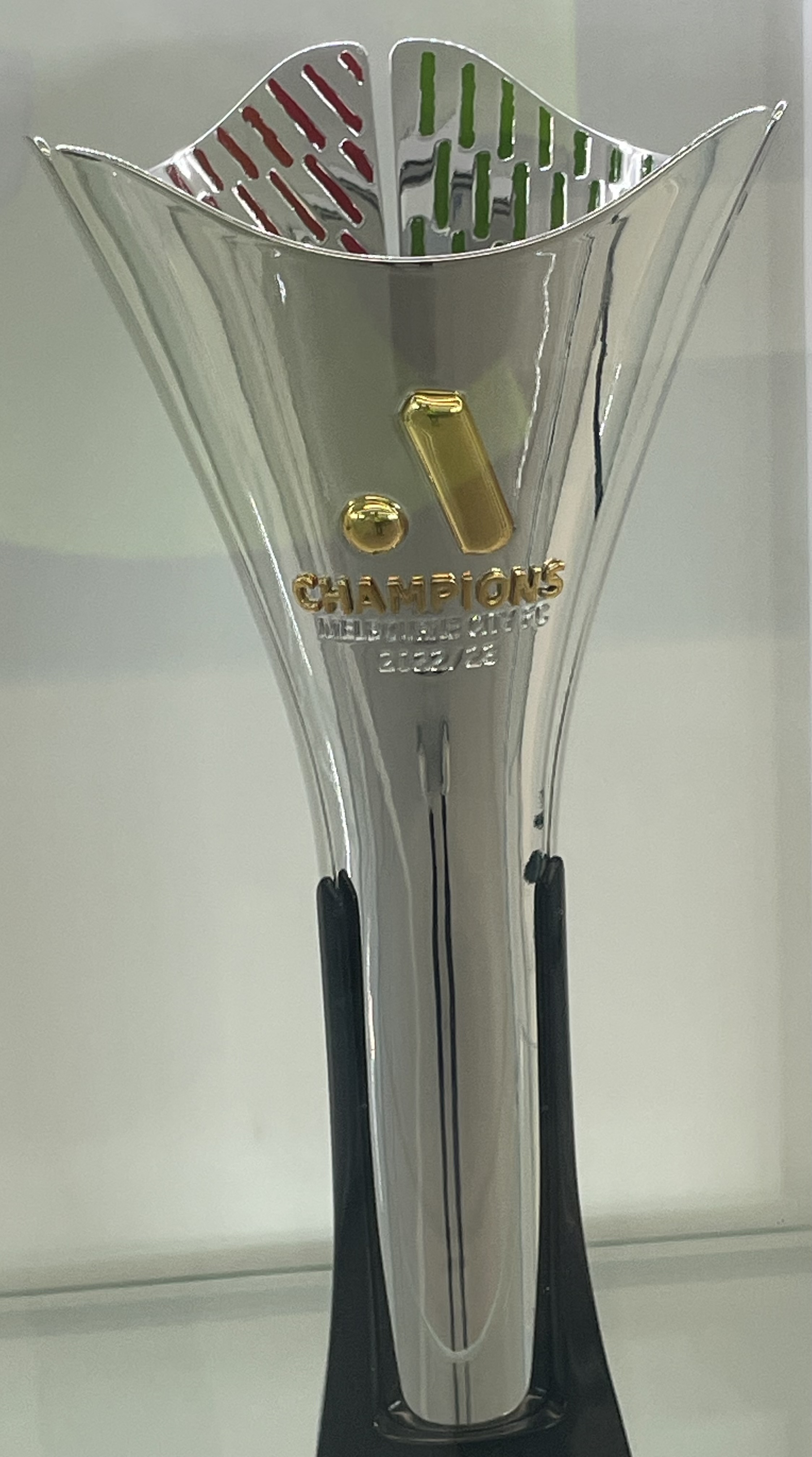
Trophy of the A-Leagues Club Championship

The A-Leagues Club Championship is an official trophy given out by the Australian Professional Leagues awarded to the best performing club during an A-Leagues season based on most combined points acquired from both the A-League Men and A-League Women's team.

== History ==
The trophy was introduced in 2021 following the rebrand of Australian soccer's premier leagues into the "A-Leagues".

Melbourne City won the first two Club Championships in 2021–22 and 2022–23, winning A-League Men premierships in both seasons.

== Winners ==
Season	Club	Points	Ref.
2021–22	Melbourne City	82	
2022–23	Melbourne City	85	
2023–24	Central Coast Mariners	90	
2024–25	Melbourne City	103	
2025–26	Melbourne City	78	
