= Australian Professional Leagues =

Operator of commercial soccer competitions in Australia

Australian Professional Leagues Company Pty Ltd
- Abbreviation: APL
- Established: 31 December 2020; 5 years ago
- Legal status: Proprietary limited company
- Owner: A-Leagues club unitholders (64.7%); Silver Lake (33.3%); Paramount Global (2%)
- Chairman: Stephen Conroy (2023–)
- Website: aleagues.com.au/more/corporate

Australian Professional Leagues Company Pty Ltd (APL), is the trustee of the Australian Professional Leagues Trust which is the owner and operator of the A-League Men, A-League Women and A-League Youth competitions, known collectively as the A-Leagues, and part owner of the E-League. It was formed in December 2020 with the unbundling of the competitions from Football Australia Limited (FA).

Following their unbundling from Football Australia at the end of 2020, APL rebranded various aspects of the professional men's, women's, and youth leagues, including the names, logos, and marketing. In 2021, American private equity firm Silver Lake purchased a 33% minority stake in the league for $140 million, valuing the league at $425 million. In August 2025, APL recorded an operating profit of $1.7 million, after losses of $57 million and $37 million in the previous two years.

APL has had financial problems and been the subject of significant controversy. In 2022, its announcement that the next three grand finals would be hosted in Sydney resulted in supporter boycotts and walkouts and an incident at the Melbourne derby where up to 200 people invaded the pitch, injuring a player and the referee. The decision was reversed after a single year and replaced with Unite Round.

== History ==
=== Unbundling from Football Australia and rebranding ===
On 31 December 2020, FA announced that APL would be established as a separate entity to assume operational responsibility of the A-League, W-League, and Y-League, while Football Australia would continue to manage the registration of clubs, players, staff, transfers, match scheduling and disciplinary and integrity matters. Ahead of the 2021–22 season, APL rebranded various aspects of the competitions under its control:

- A-League became A-League Men
- W-League became A-League Women
- Y-League became A-League Youth

The logos of the three competitions were changed to reflect the identity of the new owner. The new designs drew some criticism from social media, with fans saying that the new logos were "lazy", whilst some pointed out the resemblance to the logo the busines, Adelaide Building Consultants. Others praised the rebranding as it brought the men's and women's competitions under the same brand identity.

=== Partial sales ===
On 26 May 26 2021, ViacomCBS Inc (now Paramount Global) bought 2% of APL, as part of a five-year broadcast rights deal worth $200 million for Network 10 to broadcast and Paramount+ to stream matches.

On 14 December 2021, it was announced that American private equity firm, Silver Lake had purchased a 33.33% minority stake in APL, the sale worth $140 million, the largest injection of capital into Australian soccer in its history. The firm stated that they valued APL at $425 million.

=== 2022 grand final controversy ===
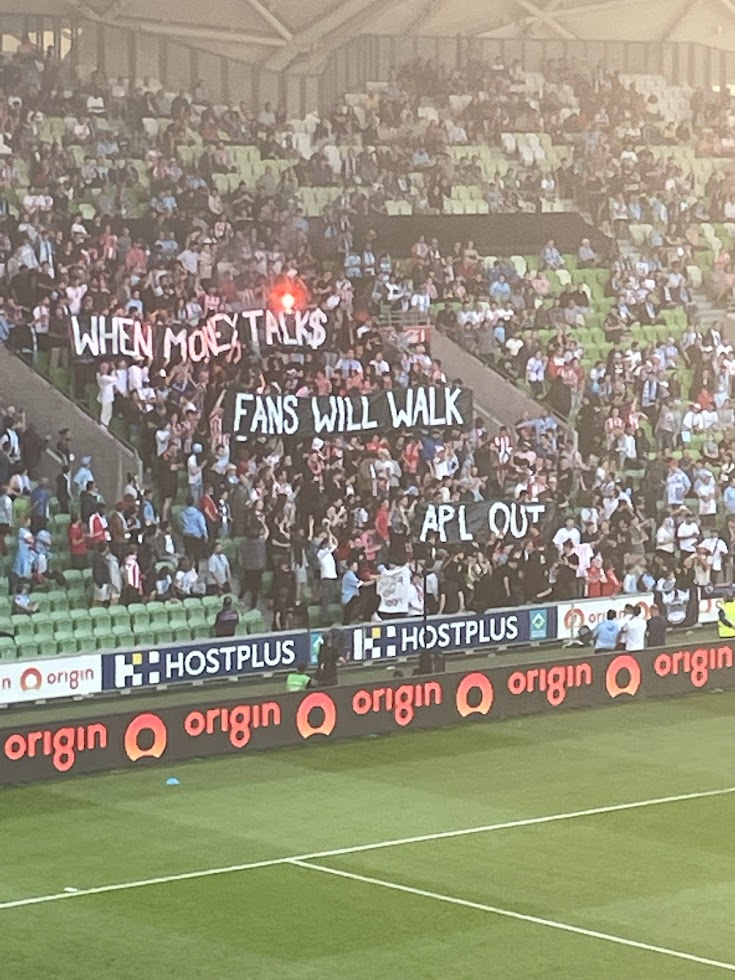
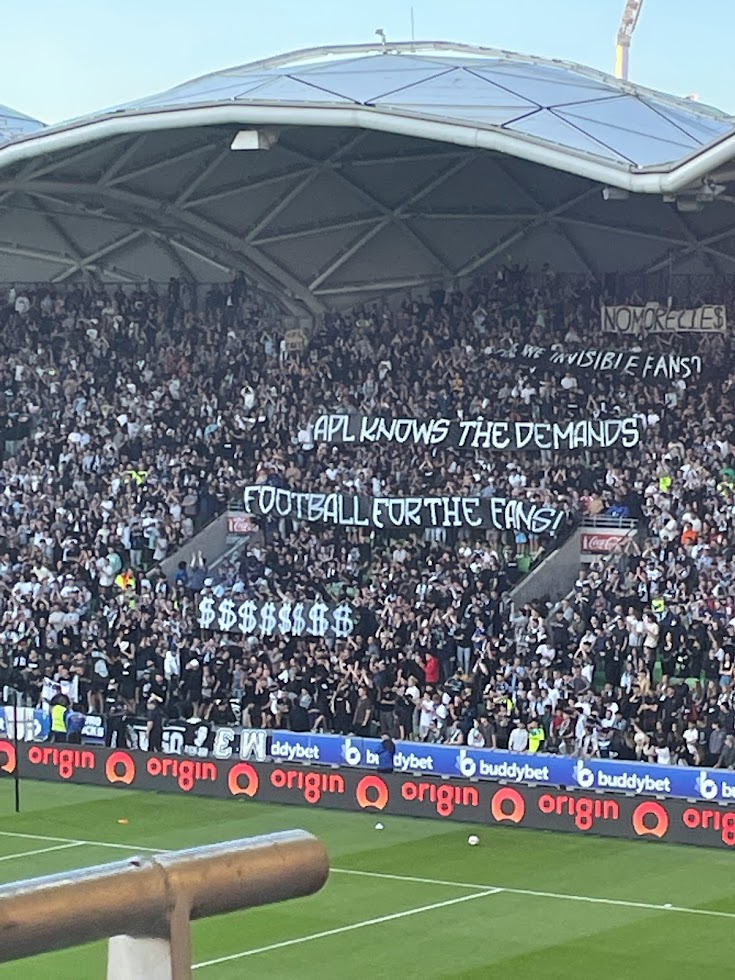
City Terrace and Original Style Melbourne, the active supporter groups of Melbourne City and Melbourne Victory respectively, protesting the decision to give A-Leagues Grand Final hosting rights to Sydney for the next three seasons in the 20th minute of the Melbourne Derby on 17 December 2022.

On 12 December 2022, the Australian Profeesional Leagues announced that the 2023, 2024 and 2025 Grand Finals would be hosted in Sydney as part of a $15 million deal with Destination NSW. The announcement was met with universal backlash from fans of all teams, former players and active support groups. Melbourne Victory and Wellington Phoenix both released a statement shortly after the announcement, saying that "they will always prefer to play any Grand Final that they earn the right to host, at their home ground". Western United said that they "do not support the Grand Finals being held in Sydney". Perth Glory chairman Tony Sage condemned the decision, also stating that "a majority of (club) owners supported the decision". Adelaide United's chairman Piet van der Pol commented that the club does not have a place on APL's seven-person board, and thus was not a part of the decision making. Melbourne City released a statement, sympathising with the frustrations of the fans, yet stating that the decision was necessary for the sustainability of the competition. Central Coast Mariners Chairman Richard Peil sent an email to the club's members, saying that the club was not consulted in any way, stating that only five of the clubs had an opportunity to vote on the decision. Sydney FC and Western Sydney Wanderers both released statements acknowledging the disappointment of the decision, saying that the decision was necessary to grow the financial side of the game. Adelaide United winger Craig Goodwin appeared in a video promoting the Grand Finals, however he stated that he does not support the decision to host the Grand Final in Sydney.

The following week, fans from various clubs staged walkouts. The first match of the weekend, on 16 December, Newcastle Jets fans walked out at the 20th minute in the game against Brisbane Roar. The most notable walkout of the round was during the Melbourne Derby. Throughout the match, supporters of both teams threw flares onto the pitch, which caused the game to be paused. Melbourne City goalkeeper Tom Glover threw a flare towards the crowd of Melbourne Victory supporters, sparking a pitch invasion, where between 100–200 people attacked Glover and referee Alex King, both sustaining minor injuries. The match was abandoned as a result.

On 21 April 2023, fans from Sydney FC's supporter group The Cove stated that they will boycott the entire finals series over the Grand Final decision, as well as APL backtracking on promises to work with supporter groups from various clubs to reach an agreement. A month later on 10 May, The Cove, called off the boycott ahead of their semi-final match against Melbourne City, following APL's announcement that all 13 clubs had committed to establishing a fan representative group.

On 18 October 2023, APL officially recinded its Grand Final decision a year into the contract's three-year run, renegotiating the deal into Unite Round, a round where all league games would be played in Sydney. This was a similar concept to the NRL's Magic Round and the AFL's Gather Round. Two days later, APL CEO Danny Townsend left his role to take up a new job in the Middle East after two years in charge. Stephen Conroy replaced him as chairman.

=== Financial problems and 2024 layoffs ===
On 16 January 2024, it was announced that a large amount of APL's workforce had been made redundant, and were laid-off. The exact number of employees laid off is unknown, with the figure ranging from 20–75%, of their 80–130 staff. The layoffs were made to stabilise APL in the short term, allowing for a restructuring of the company.

On 3 July 2024, the money distributed to clubs for the 2024–25 A-League Men season was reduced from over $2 million to $530,000, due to the administration's overambitious spending. The cuts were said to be necessary for APL to stay afloat, as it would allow them to break even over the next financial year.

On 15 August 2025, APL reported a $1.7 million preliminary operating profit for the recently completed financial year, after previously recording losses of $55 million and $37 million in 2023 and 2024 respectively; a 34% reduction in operating expenses from the previous year was cited as a contributing factor behind APL's improved financial position.

== KeepUp ==
KeepUp
- The KeepUp homepage on 26 February 2024, four days before the website was closed.
- Owner: APL
- Website: keepup.com.au
- Launched: 11 November 2021
- Current status: Defunct since 1 March 2024, redirects to aleagues.com.au/alumni

On 11 November 2021, APL launched the KeepUp (stylised as KEEPUP.) app. The app contained news primarily from the A-League Men, A-League Women and Australia Cup competitions, Asian continental competitions, the AFC Champions League and AFC Cup, and popular European competitions. It also featured an official A-Leagues fantasy and tipping competition, which was launched on 21 September 2022, ahead of the 2022–23 season. The app was reported to cost $30 million to launch, which drew some criticism.

As part of APL's January 2024 layoffs, it was announced that KeepUp would be closed on 1 March 2024, under three years since its launch. One of the reasons for the closure was cited as high expenditure, with the cost of running the service being estimated of up to $50 million.
