= Rai Marchán =

Spanish footballer (born 1993)

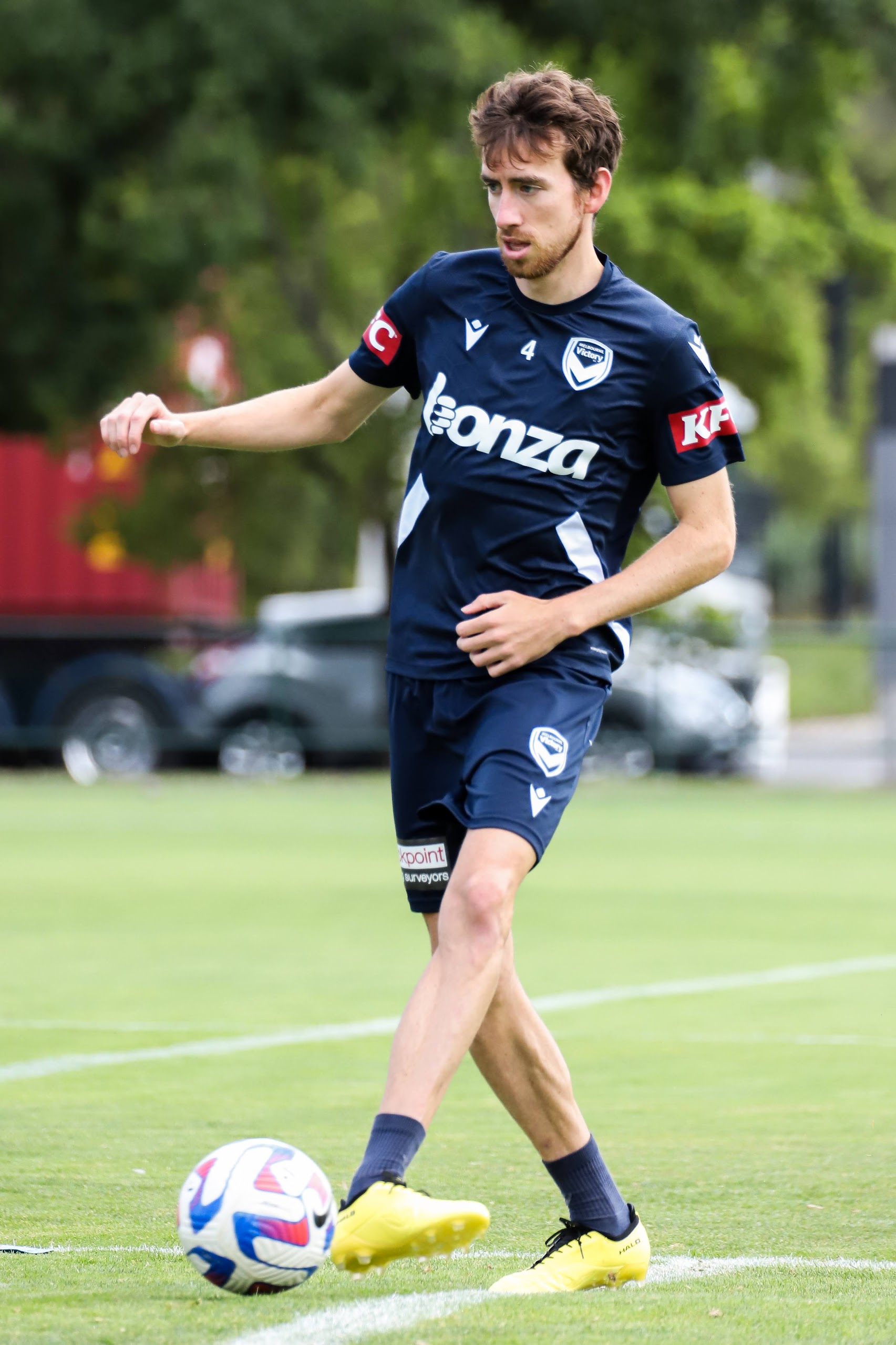

Personal information
- Full name: Raimon Marchán Vidal
- Date of birth: 11 August 1993 (age 33)
- Place of birth: Vilafranca del Penedès, Spain
- Height: 1.81 m (5 ft 11 in)
- Position: Defensive midfielder

Team information
- Current team: Alcorcón
- Number: 5

Youth career
- Vilafranca
- 2010–2012: Real Madrid

Senior career*
Years	Team	Apps	(Gls)
2012–2014	Real Madrid C	32	(0)
2012–2013	→ Leganés (loan)	7	(0)
2015–2016	Valencia B	7	(0)
2016–2017	Valladolid B	35	(1)
2017–2019	Celta B	76	(0)
2019–2021	Andorra	44	(0)
2021–2024	Melbourne Victory	50	(0)
2024–2025	Albacete	34	(1)
2025–	Alcorcón	31	(0)
- * Club domestic league appearances and goals as of 10 June 2026

Raimon "Rai" Marchán Vidal (born 11 August 1993) is a Spanish professional footballer who plays as a defensive midfielder for Primera Federación club Alcorcón.

He spent most of his career in the Segunda División B, totalling 194 games with six clubs. In 2021, he signed for Melbourne Victory in the A-League Men.

== Football career ==
=== Spain ===
Born in Vilafranca del Penedès, Barcelona, Catalonia, Marchán was a Real Madrid CF youth product and made his senior debut on loan to CD Leganés in the Segunda División B in 2012. He played the following season with the capital club's C-team in the same division, ending in administrative relegation, and in 2015 he signed for another reserve team, Valencia CF Mestalla.

After a year at Real Valladolid Promesas, Marchán joined yet another third-tier second team in July 2017, signing for two years at Celta de Vigo B with the option of two more. On 28 August 2019, he signed for FC Andorra, again in the same division.

=== Melbourne Victory ===
On 27 July 2021, Marchán signed for Melbourne Victory FC in the Australian A-League Men. He was sent off on 5 December in a 3–0 home loss to Perth Glory FC, for a high challenge on Jonathan Aspropotamitis in first-half added time.

On 25 January 2022, in a game against Sydney FC at the Melbourne Rectangular Stadium, Marchán clashed heads with teammate Jason Geria and was taken off in a stretcher. His facial fractures caused him to eat less and drop five kilograms in weight from what he already described as a slender frame, requiring him to bulk up in order to be recalled by manager Tony Popovic. He made his comeback in his continental debut on 15 March, an AFC Champions League playoff lost 4–3 away to Japanese club Vissel Kobe.

Having made 21 league appearances, Marchán was given a two-year contract extension in June 2022. He earned an interesting statistical oddity as a result of the postponement of a Melbourne Derby game due to a pitch invasion. He had originally started the match before it stopped in the 21st minute, and when it resumed 4 months later both teams were allowed to remake their squads. Marchán was on the bench this time, and as a result he came on as a substitute in the 67th minute of a game he had started & played the first 21 minutes in.

=== Albacete ===
After leaving Melbourne, Marchán signed a short-term deal with Albacete Balompié back in his country's Segunda División on 1 February 2024.

== Personal life ==
Marchán graduated from Universidad Camilo José Cela with a degree in business administration.
