= Tom Glover (soccer) =

Australian soccer player (born 1997)

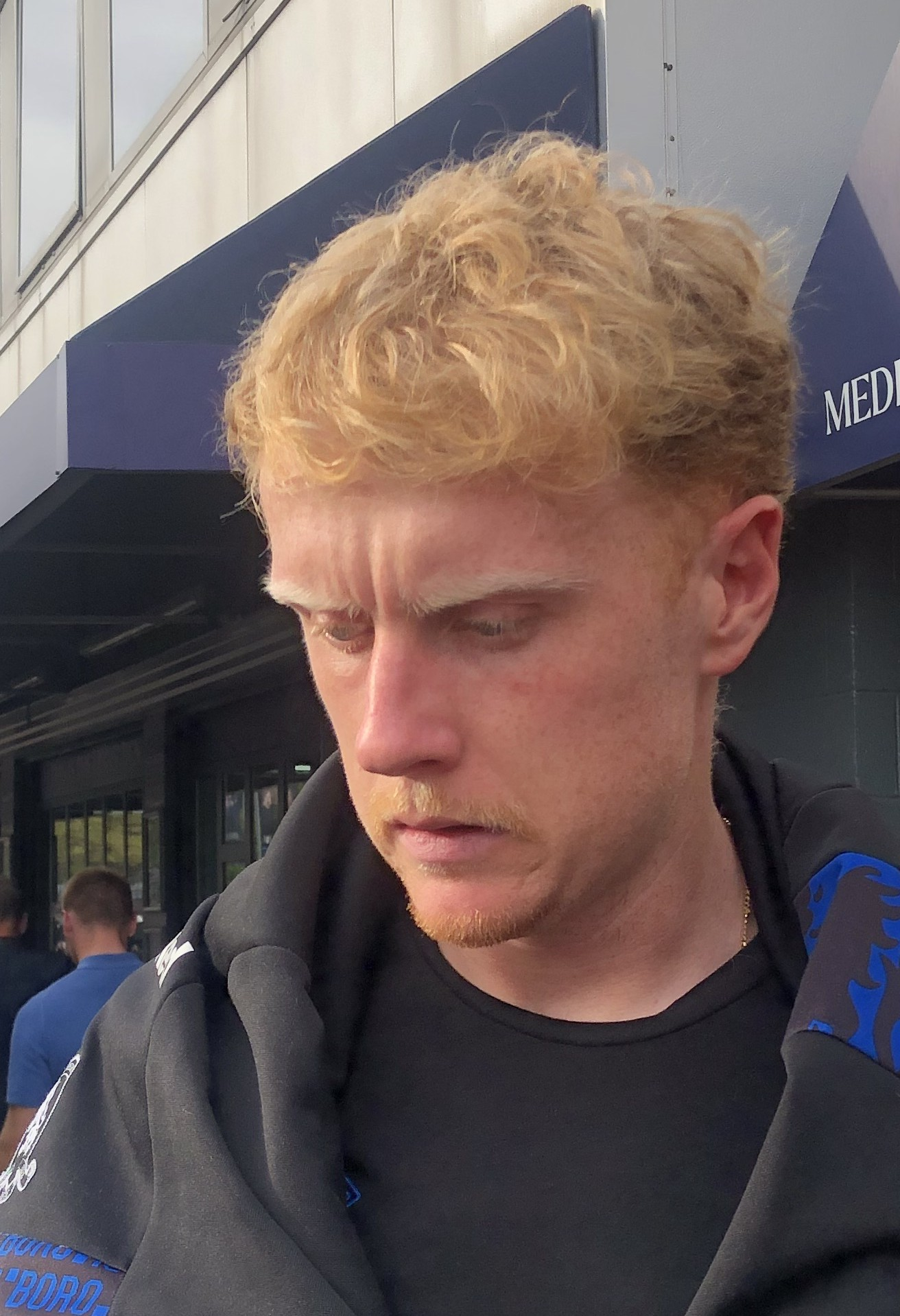
- Glover in 2025

Personal information
- Full name: Thomas William Glover
- Date of birth: 24 December 1997 (age 28)
- Place of birth: Sydney, New South Wales, Australia
- Height: 1.96 m (6 ft 5 in)
- Position: Goalkeeper

Team information
- Current team: RB Omiya Ardija
- Number: 24

Youth career
- Sutherland Sharks
- 2014–2017: Tottenham Hotspur

Senior career*
Years	Team	Apps	(Gls)
2017–2019	Tottenham Hotspur	0	(0)
2017–2018	→ Central Coast Mariners (loan)	4	(0)
2019	→ Helsingborg (loan)	0	(0)
2019–2023	Melbourne City	98	(0)
2023–2025	Middlesbrough	19	(0)
2026–	RB Omiya Ardija	17	(0)

International career
2016	Australia U20	5	(0)
2017–2021	Australia U23	13	(0)
Medal record
Representing Australia
Men's Association football
AFC U-23 Asian Cup
Third place	2020 Thailand
- * Club domestic league appearances and goals as of 21:24, 10 June 2026 (UTC)

Thomas William Glover (born 24 December 1997) is an Australian professional soccer player who plays as a goalkeeper for J2 League club RB Omiya Ardija.

== Early life ==
Born in Sydney, Glover attended Menai High School in the Sutherland Shire and previously played for the Sutherland Sharks youth teams. He was also a keen basketball player at school. In 2014, Glover moved to London to join Tottenham Hotspur.

== Club career ==
=== Tottenham Hotspur ===
Glover joined Tottenham's Academy full-time in the summer of 2014, he started 16 times for the Under-18s in the 2014/15 season and impressively produced a string of penalty saves throughout the season. He stepped up to make his Under-21s debut in a 2–1 defeat at Liverpool in October 2014, and played twice in Tottenham's run to the FA Youth Cup semi-finals.

In 2015–16, he made 11 league appearances for the Under-21s, in addition to four appearances in the Premier League Under-21 International Cup. As a result of many impressive performances he signed a new contract with the Club in December 2015, and was also part of the first team squad on matchdays on a handful of occasions, serving as back-up to Hugo Lloris and Michel Vorm.

==== Loan to Central Coast Mariners ====
On 26 July 2017, Glover joined Central Coast Mariners on a season-long loan. He then went on to make his senior debut for the Mariners on 7 October 2017 in round one of the 2017–18 A-League season, a loss to Newcastle Jets in the F3 Derby.

Glover had a trial spell with Scottish Premiership club Hibernian in January 2019.

==== Loan to Helsingborg ====
In April 2019, Glover was loaned to Helsingborg for a few months.

At the end of the 2018–19 season Glover was released from his contract.

=== Melbourne City ===
Glover returned to Australia and was signed by Melbourne City. He made his debut in a 4–0 win over Newcastle Jets in December 2019.

Glover made his first A-League Grand Final in 2020 where City lost 1–0 to Sydney FC in extra time. At the start of September 2020, Glover won the July/August Nominee for Young Footballer of the Year.

On 17 December 2022 at the Melbourne Derby Glover was struck in the head by a metal bucket after Melbourne Victory supporters entered the field of play as part of a planned protest against the APL decision to sell the A-League Grand Final to the Government of New South Wales. Fans of Melbourne City and Melbourne Victory had planned to stage a walkout at the 20 minute mark of the game, but invaded the pitch after Glover threw a flare back towards Victory supporters.

=== Middlesbrough ===
On 7 July 2023, Glover returned to England with Championship club Middlesbrough, signing a three-year deal. He made his league debut on 16 December 2023 in a 2–1 win over Swansea City as a 91st-minute substitute.

On 1 September 2025, he left Middlesbrough after being released.

=== RB Omiya Ardija ===
On 24 December 2025, Glover signed for J2 League club RB Omiya Ardija.

== International career ==
Glover was included in the Australian under-23 squad for the 2020 Summer Olympics in Tokyo.

In September 2023, Glover was called-up for the first time to the Australia senior national team ahead of a friendly match against Mexico.

== Career statistics ==
As of match played 6 June 2026

Appearances and goals by club, season and competition
Club	Season	League			National cup (Note: Includes Australia Cup, FA Cup)		League cup (Note: Includes EFL Cup)		Continental		Other		Total	
Club	Season	Division	Apps	Goals	Apps	Goals	Apps	Goals	Apps	Goals	Apps	Goals	Apps	Goals
Central Coast Mariners (loan)	2017–18	A-League	4	0	0	0	—		—		—		4	0
Helsingborg (loan)	2019	Allsvenskan	0	0	0	0	—		—		—		0	0
Melbourne City	2019–20	A-League	15	0	0	0	—		—		—		15	0
Melbourne City	2020–21	A-League	27	0	—		—		—		—		27	0
Melbourne City	2021–22	A-League	27	0	3	0	—		6 (Note: Appearances in AFC Champions League)	0	—		36	0
Melbourne City	2022–23	A-League	29	0	2	0	—		—		—		31	0
Melbourne City	Total		98	0	5	0	—		6	0	—		109	0
Middlesbrough	2023–24	EFL Championship	12	0	1	0	7	0	—		—		20	0
Middlesbrough	2024–25	EFL Championship	7	0	1	0	0	0	—		—		8	0
Middlesbrough	2025–26	EFL Championship	0	0	—		1	0	—		—		1	0
Middlesbrough	Total		19	0	2	0	8	0	—		—		29	0
RB Omiya Ardija	2026	J2/J3	17	0	—		—		—		—		17	0
Career total			138	0	7	0	8	0	6	0	0	0	159	0

== Honours ==
Melbourne City

- A-League premiership: 2020–21, 2021–22, 2022–23
- A-League championship: 2020–21

Australia U-23

- AFC U-23 Asian Cup third place: 2020
