= Alex King (referee) =

Australian association football referee

- Full name: Alexander George King
- Born: Queensland, Australia
- Other occupation: Carpenter

Domestic
Years	League	Role
2017–	A-League	Referee
2014–2016	A-League	Fourth official

International
Years	League	Role
2020–	FIFA listed	Referee

Alexander George King is an Australian association football referee. He is a full-time referee in the A-League since 2019, and was the league's Referee of the Year in 2021–22, 2023–24, and 2025–26. He has been an international FIFA referee since 2020.

== Biography ==
Born in Queensland, where he attended Bribie Island State High School, King began refereeing at the age of 13.

King became a fourth official in the A-League in 2014, and the following year he made his debut as a referee in the league by replacing the injured Alan Milliner in the last ten minutes of the match between Melbourne Victory and Wellington Phoenix. He was selected as one of the league's 13 referees for the 2017–18 season.

In September 2019, King was named as one of Football Australia's three full-time referees alongside Chris Beath and Shaun Evans, replacing Jarred Gillett who had moved to England; he had previously worked as a carpenter. At the turn of the year, he was added to the FIFA International Referees List as one of five Australian male referees.

King was appointed to the 2022 AFC Cup Final in Kuala Lumpur, Malaysia, as AVAR2, and was awarded Referee of the Year for the 2021–22 A-League Men season. On 17 December 2022, he was the referee in a Melbourne Derby between Melbourne City and Melbourne Victory, when Victory fans stormed the pitch. He and City goalkeeper Tom Glover received head injuries by being struck with a metal bucket.

King was a part of the Asian Football Confederation Referee Academy from 2018 to 2022, and was selected to officiate at the 2022 AFC U-23 Asian Cup, he was appointed to a single match between Iran and Turkmenistan. He was also selected to officiate at the 2024 AFC U-23 Asian Cup and was appointed a single match between Kuwait and Malaysia.

King was voted Referee of the Season in the 2023–24 A-League Men. He was thereby appointed as the referee for the 2024 A-League Men Grand Final, between Central Coast Mariners FC and Melbourne Victory.

In the 2025–26 A-League Men, King was voted Referee of the Year for the third time. As a result, he officiated in the 2026 A-League Men Grand Final, between Auckland FC and Sydney FC.
