= Jason Geria =

Australian soccer player (born 1993)

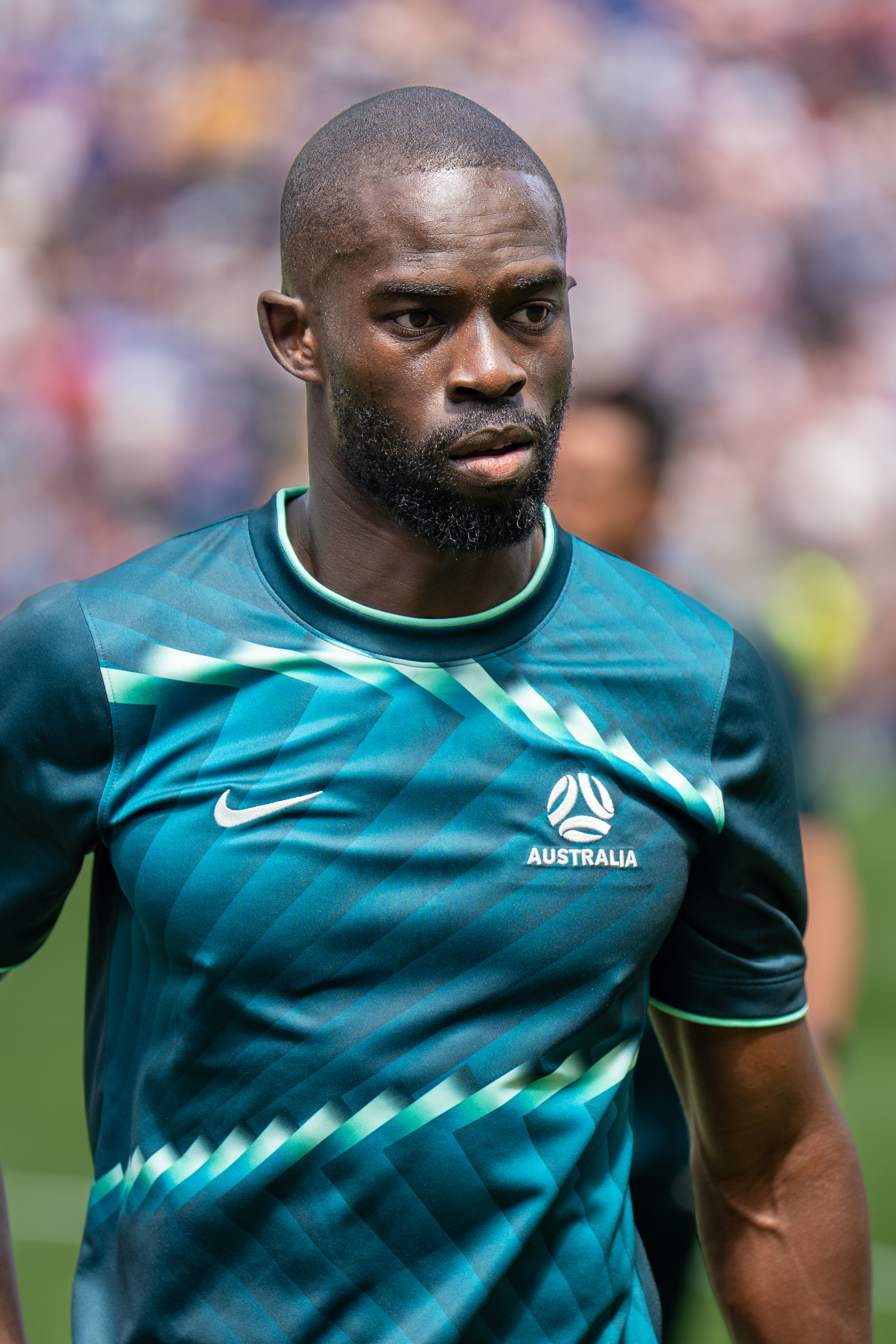
- Geria with Australia in 2026

Personal information
- Full name: Jason Kato Geria
- Date of birth: 10 May 1993 (age 33)
- Place of birth: Canberra, Australia
- Height: 1.84 m (6 ft 0 in)
- Position: Right back

Team information
- Current team: Albirex Niigata
- Number: 2

Youth career
- Weston Creek SC
- Woden Valley SC
- 2009–2011: AIS
- 2011–2012: Brisbane Roar
- 2012–2013: Melbourne Victory

Senior career*
| Years | Team | Apps | (Gls) |
| 2013–2018 | Melbourne Victory | 107 | (0) |
| 2018–2020 | JEF United Chiba | 57 | (2) |
| 2021 | Perth Glory | 13 | (0) |
| 2021–2025 | Melbourne Victory | 82 | (4) |
| 2025– | Albirex Niigata | 33 | (1) |

International career^{‡}
| 2011–2013 | Australia U20 | 20 | (3) |
| 2014–2015 | Australia U23 | 8 | (0) |
| 2016– | Australia | 16 | (0) |
- * Club domestic league appearances and goals as of 16 August 2026 ‡ National team caps and goals as of 19 June 2026

Jason Kato Geria (born 10 May 1993) is an Australian professional soccer player who plays as a defender for Albirex Niigata in the J2 League and the Australia national team.

Born in Canberra, Geria played youth football with the Australian Institute of Sport and Brisbane Roar youth before joining Melbourne Victory in 2012, where he made his professional debut and played for five years. He then joined Japanese club JEF United Chiba in 2018.

Geria is Melbourne Victory's third most capped player, with 224 appearances in all competitions.

== Early life ==
Geria was born in Canberra to Ugandan parents.

== Club career ==
=== Youth ===
Geria's first youth club was Weston Creek SC in Canberra. He also played in Woden Valley's youth sides. Geria was a member of the Australian Institute of Sport football program before joining Brisbane Roar's youth team in 2011. He eventually became captain of the side in the National Youth League.

=== Melbourne Victory ===
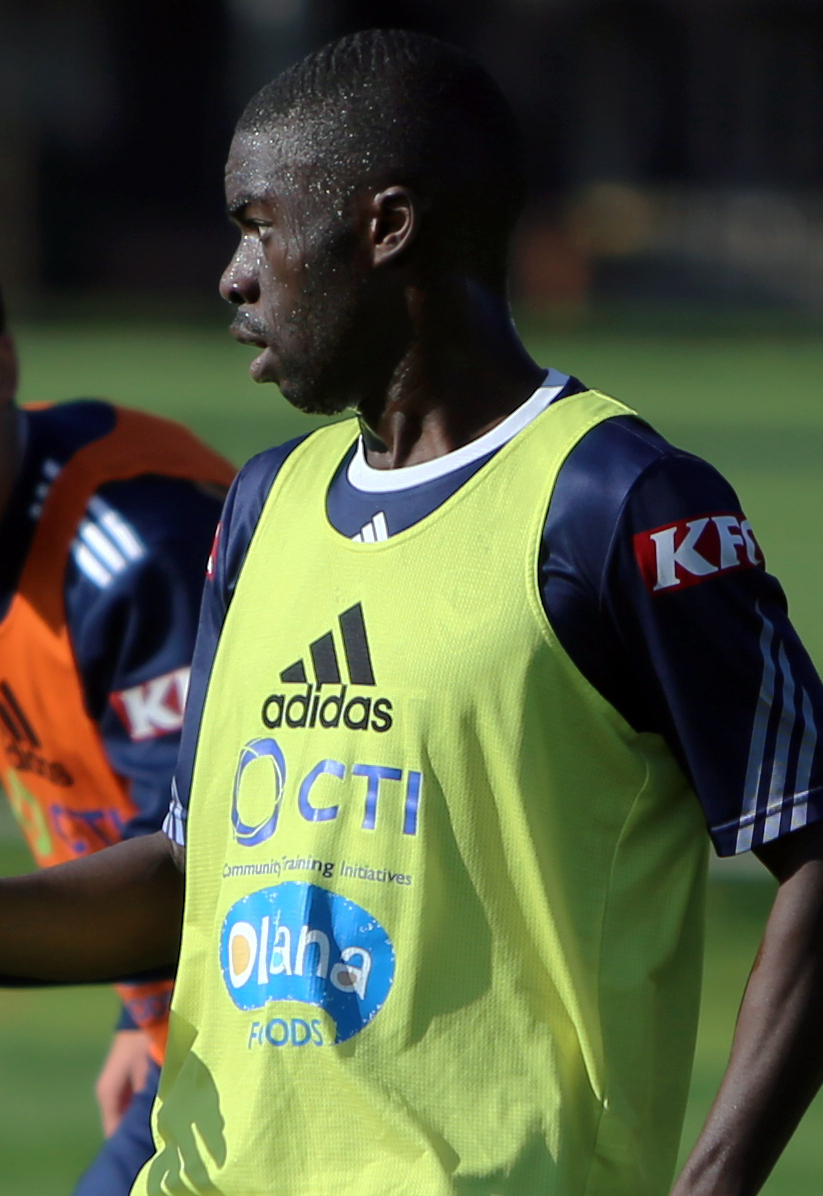
Geria training with Melbourne Victory in 2015

On 29 November 2012, Geria was signed for Melbourne Victory by ex-Roar coach Ange Postecoglou. Despite often missing A-League games due to national youth team commitments, Geria became a regular first team player and was awarded the number 2 shirt, although it took him almost three years to score his first senior goal for the club, against Hume City in the 2015 FFA Cup Semi Final on 28 October 2015.

=== JEF United Chiba ===
In March 2018, Geria left Melbourne Victory and transferred to J2 League club JEF United Chiba for a $800,000 transfer fee.

=== Perth Glory ===
In March 2021, 3 months after leaving JEF United Chiba, Geria returned to Australia, joining A-League club Perth Glory on a contract for the remainder of the 2020–21 A-League season. In June 2021, he left Perth Glory at the conclusion of his contract.

=== Return to Melbourne Victory ===
In July 2021, Geria re-joined Melbourne Victory, ahead of the 2021–22 A-League season. Geria lifted the 2021 FFA Cup and was named in the 2022 PFA Team of the Year in 2022. Geria departed Victory in January 2025.

=== Albirex Niigata ===
In the January transfer window of 2025, Geria secured a move to J1 League club Albirex Niigata, marking his second spell playing in Japan.

== International career ==
Geria was eligible to represent Uganda (as both of his parents had Ugandan nationality) and also the country of his birth, Australia. Prior to October 2024, he had only represented Australia in friendlies, so was still eligible to represent Uganda.

Geria played for Australia numerous times at youth level, including participating in the 2013 FIFA U-20 World Cup, and the 2016 AFC U-23 Championship.

Geria was first called up to the Socceroos by Ange Postecoglou (with whom he had played for at club level) in March 2016 for two 2018 FIFA World Cup qualification matches that month against Tajikistan and Jordan, but he didn't play any match.

Geria was called up for the Socceroos for two home friendlies against Greece in June 2016, and played in the first match in a 1–0 win on 4 June.

In October 2024, Geria was called up by Tony Popovic ahead of their 2026 FIFA World Cup qualifying matches against China and Japan. On 10 October, he made his first international return after eight years in a 3–1 win over China.

Geria was selected in the 2026 FIFA World Cup squad, which will be his first major tournament with the national team.

== Career statistics ==
=== Club ===
As of 15 September 2026.

Appearances and goals by club, season and competition
| Club | Season | League | | | Cup | | League Cup | | Continental | | Total | |
| Club | Season | Division | Apps | Goals | Apps | Goals | Apps | Goals | Apps | Goals | Apps | Goals |
|---|---|---|---|---|---|---|---|---|---|---|---|---|
| Melbourne Victory | 2012–13 | A-League | 4 | 0 | — | | — | | — | | 4 | 0 |
| Melbourne Victory | 2013–14 | A-League | 21 | 0 | — | | — | | 6 | 0 | 27 | 0 |
| Melbourne Victory | 2014–15 | A-League | 16 | 0 | 2 | 0 | — | | — | | 18 | 0 |
| Melbourne Victory | 2015–16 | A-League | 18 | 0 | 4 | 1 | — | | 8 | 0 | 30 | 1 |
| Melbourne Victory | 2016–17 | A-League | 27 | 0 | 3 | 0 | — | | — | | 30 | 0 |
| Melbourne Victory | 2017–18 | A-League | 21 | 0 | 2 | 0 | — | | 2 | 0 | 25 | 0 |
| Melbourne Victory | Total | | 107 | 0 | 12 | 1 | — | | 16 | 0 | 135 | 1 |
| JEF United Chiba | 2018 | J2 League | 14 | 0 | 2 | 0 | — | | — | | 16 | 0 |
| JEF United Chiba | 2019 | J2 League | 21 | 0 | 0 | 0 | — | | — | | 21 | 0 |
| JEF United Chiba | 2020 | J2 League | 22 | 2 | 0 | 0 | — | | — | | 22 | 2 |
| JEF United Chiba | Total | | 57 | 2 | 2 | 0 | — | | — | | 59 | 2 |
| Perth Glory | 2020–21 | A-League | 13 | 0 | 0 | 0 | — | | — | | 13 | 0 |
| Melbourne Victory | 2021–22 | A-League Men | 27 | 2 | 2 | 0 | — | | 1 | 0 | 30 | 2 |
| Melbourne Victory | 2022–23 | A-League Men | 14 | 0 | 0 | 0 | — | | — | | 14 | 0 |
| Melbourne Victory | 2023–24 | A-League Men | 28 | 1 | 0 | 0 | — | | — | | 28 | 1 |
| Melbourne Victory | 2024–25 | A-League Men | 12 | 1 | 5 | 0 | — | | — | | 17 | 1 |
| Melbourne Victory | Total | | 94 | 4 | 7 | 0 | — | | 1 | 0 | 102 | 4 |
| Albirex Niigata | 2025 | J1 League | 22 | 0 | 0 | 0 | 0 | 0 | — | | 22 | 0 |
| Albirex Niigata | 2026 | J2/J3 100 Year Vision League | 11 | 1 | — | | — | | — | | 11 | 1 |
| Albirex Niigata | 2026 | J2 League | 1 | 0 | 0 | 0 | 1 | 0 | — | | 2 | 0 |
| Albirex Niigata | Total | | 34 | 1 | 0 | 0 | 1 | 0 | 0 | 0 | 35 | 1 |
| Career total | | | 292 | 5 | 21 | 1 | 1 | 0 | 17 | 0 | 331 | 6 |

== Honours ==
Melbourne Victory

- A-League Championship: 2014–2015
- A-League Premiership: 2014–2015
- FFA Cup: 2015, 2021

Individual

- PFA A-League Team of the Season: 2021–22
