= George Timotheou =

Australian soccer player

Personal information
- Full name: George Christos Timotheou
- Date of birth: 29 July 1997 (age 29)
- Place of birth: Canberra, Australia
- Height: 1.90 m (6 ft 3 in)
- Position: Centre-back

Team information
- Current team: Sydney Olympic
- Number: 4

Youth career
- –2011: Canberra Olympic
- 2014–2015: Sydney FC
- 2015: Blacktown City
- 2016–2017: Sydney FC

Senior career*
Years	Team	Apps	(Gls)
2012	ACTAS	10	(0)
2013	AIS	10	(0)
2014	Belconnen United	5	(0)
2015	Blacktown City	5	(0)
2016–2017	Sydney FC NPL	35	(1)
2016–2017	Sydney FC	0	(0)
2017–2018	Sydney Olympic	24	(1)
2018–2019	Schalke 04 II	23	(2)
2019	Schalke 04	1	(0)
2019–2020	Zulte Waregem	1	(0)
2020–2022	Adelaide United	19	(0)
2022–2023	Melbourne Victory	6	(0)
2023	Gungahlin United	0	(0)
2024–	Sydney Olympic	0	(0)

International career^{‡}
2015–2016	Australia U20	7	(0)
Medal record
Men's football
Representing Australia
AFF U-19 Youth Championship
First place	2016 Vietnam	U-20 Team
- * Club domestic league appearances and goals as of 30 April 2023 ‡ National team caps and goals as of 12:50, 18 May 2019 (UTC)

George Christos Timotheou (born 29 July 1997) is an Australian football player who plays as a centre-back for Gungahlin United. He last played professionally for Melbourne Victory.

== Club career ==
Timotheou started his professional career at Sydney FC, but never managed to break into the first team, instead playing in their reserve squad in the NPL. However halfway through his two-year contract, he left the club to sign for Sydney Olympic FC, where he made 27 appearances, during his 2 seasons there, before leaving to sign a deal with Bundesliga club Schalke 04. Timotheou made his professional debut for Schalke 04 in the Bundesliga on 18 May 2019, starting in the home match against VfB Stuttgart. In November 2020, Timotheou returned to the A-League, signing with Adelaide United on a two-year deal.

== Personal life ==
Timotheou was born in Canberra, Australia and is of Greek descent.

== Honours ==
=== International ===
Australia U20

- AFF U-19 Youth Championship: 2016
