= Fernando Romero (footballer) =

Paraguayan footballer (born 2000)

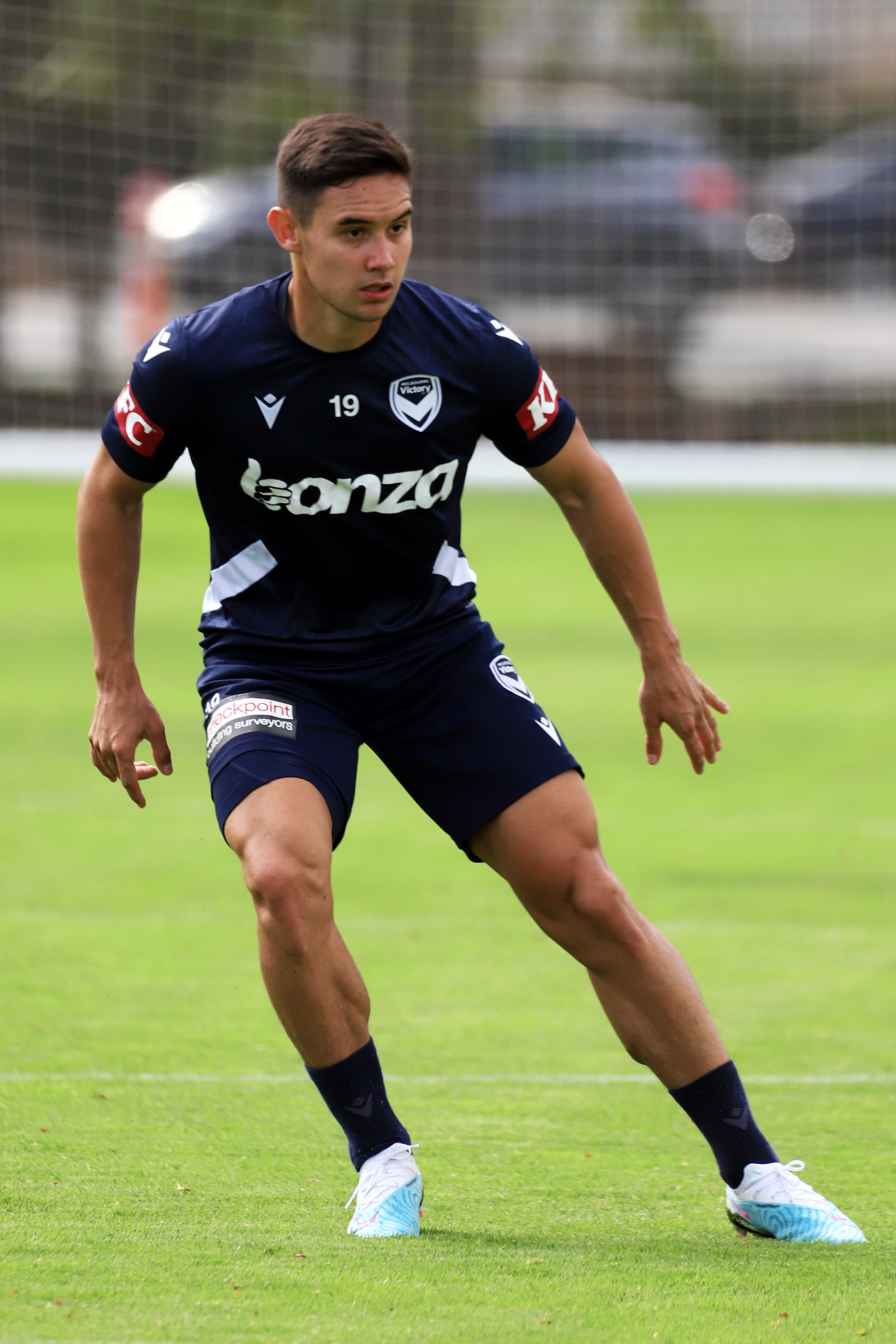
- Romero with Melbourne Victory in 2023

Personal information
- Full name: Fernando Raúl Romero González
- Date of birth: 24 April 2000 (age 26)
- Place of birth: Asunción, Paraguay
- Height: 1.74 m (5 ft 9 in)
- Position: Striker

Team information
- Current team: Deportes Concepción (on loan from Independiente Rivadavia)

Senior career*
Years	Team	Apps	(Gls)
2018–2021	Nacional Asunción	23	(2)
2020–2021	→ Guaireña (loan)	23	(7)
2021–2024	Cerro Porteño	39	(6)
2023	→ Melbourne Victory (loan)	10	(2)
2024	→ Sportivo Trinidense (loan)	16	(4)
2024–	Independiente Rivadavia	15	(1)
2025–2026	→ Sportivo Trinidense (loan)	34	(10)
2026–	→ Deportes Concepción (loan)	0	(0)

International career
2017	Paraguay U17	12	(3)
2018	Paraguay U19	3	(1)
2019	Paraguay U20	4	(0)
- * Club domestic league appearances and goals as of 13 August 2025

Fernando Raúl Romero González (born 24 April 2000) is a Paraguayan professional footballer who plays as a forward for Chilean club Deportes Concepción on loan from Argentine club Independiente Rivadavia.

== Club career ==
Fernando has played 76 Paraguayan top flight games, and has also previously made appearances in Copa Libertadores and Copa Sudamericana. In February 2023, Fernando was loaned to Melbourne Victory until the end of the 2022–23 A-League Men season.

As a player for Argentine club Independiente Rivadavia, Romero was loaned out to Sportivo Trinidense in June 2025. A year later, he was loaned out to Chilean club Deportes Concepción until the end of 2026 with a purchase option.
