= Roderick Miranda =

Portuguese footballer (born 1991)

Roderick
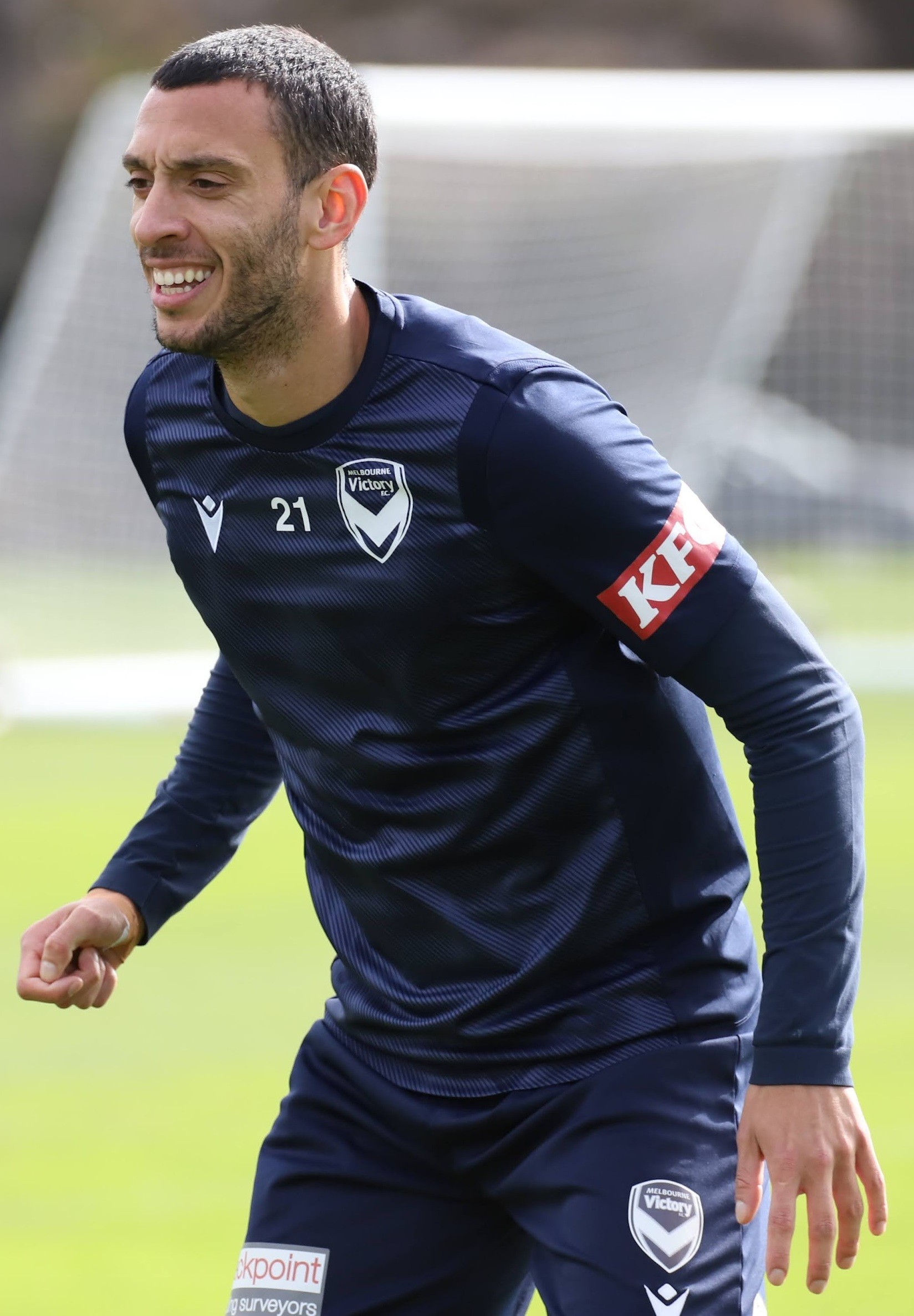
- Roderick with Melbourne Victory in 2022

Personal information
- Full name: Roderick Jefferson Gonçalves Miranda
- Date of birth: 30 March 1991 (age 35)
- Place of birth: Odivelas, Portugal
- Height: 1.91 m (6 ft 3 in)
- Position: Centre-back

Youth career
- 1999–2000: Odivelas
- 2000–2010: Benfica

Senior career*
Years	Team	Apps	(Gls)
2010–2013	Benfica	7	(0)
2011–2012	→ Servette (loan)	24	(0)
2012	→ Deportivo La Coruña (loan)	3	(0)
2012–2013	Benfica B	5	(0)
2013–2017	Rio Ave	72	(4)
2017–2021	Wolverhampton Wanderers	17	(0)
2018–2019	→ Olympiacos (loan)	8	(0)
2019–2020	→ Famalicão (loan)	24	(2)
2021	Gaziantep	13	(0)
2021–2026	Melbourne Victory	120	(5)

International career
2007	Portugal U17	6	(0)
2008	Portugal U18	3	(0)
2008–2010	Portugal U19	22	(0)
2010–2011	Portugal U20	14	(0)
Medal record
Men's football
Representing Portugal
FIFA U-20 World Cup
Runner-up	2011 Colombia
- * Club domestic league appearances and goals as of 01:54, 2 July 2026 (UTC)

Roderick Jefferson Gonçalves Miranda CvIH (Portuguese: [ʁu.ðɨ.ˈɾik ˈʒɛ.fɛ.sɔ̃ ɡõ.ˈsaɫ.vɨʃ mi.ˈɾɐ̃.dɐ]; born 30 March 1991), known as Roderick, is a Portuguese professional footballer who plays as a centre-back.

Having started his professional career at Benfica, he made 103 Primeira Liga appearances mainly for Rio Ave as well as Famalicão. He also played in Switzerland, Spain, England, Greece, Turkey and Australia.

== Club career ==
=== Benfica ===
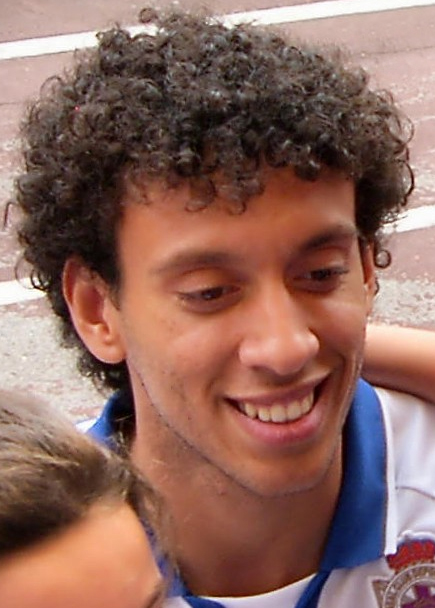
Roderick at his Deportivo presentation

Born in Odivelas, Roderick arrived in Benfica's youth academy in 2000 (aged nine), from Lisbon neighbours Odivelas. He was promoted to the first team nine years later after having played in all the youth ranks, and made his debut on 17 December 2009 in a dead rubber game in the group stage of the UEFA Europa League, featuring for the full 90 minutes of a 2–1 home win against AEK Athens. His only other appearance was on 13 January, in a 1–1 away draw with Vitória de Guimarães in the Taça da Liga round-robin.

Roderick played his first game in the Primeira Liga on 7 November 2010, as a 73rd-minute substitute for Carlos Martins in a 5–0 loss at Porto in O Clássico. For 2011–12, he was loaned to Servette in Switzerland – coached by former Benfica player João Alves – in a season-long move.

On 31 July 2012, Roderick joined Deportivo de La Coruña of La Liga, also on loan for a season. He made four appearances, starting with a 1–1 draw at Athletic Bilbao in which he requested his substitution through injury; he returned to the Estádio da Luz in the following transfer window.

In one of only two league matches in the 2012–13 campaign, Roderick came on away to Porto in the penultimate round of fixtures, with both teams competing for the title; he was marking Kelvin, who scored the added-time winner. He said years later that manager Jorge Jesus did not blame him for the defeat.

=== Rio Ave ===
Roderick was released by Benfica in August 2013, signing a five-year deal with Rio Ave. In January 2015, he suffered an Achilles tendon injury against Gil Vicente, and was ruled out for the rest of the season.

On 18 March 2016, nearing his 25th birthday, Roderick scored his first senior goal, a header that was the only one in a home game with Marítimo. He netted three times in 33 games in the following campaign, helping to a seventh-place finish.

=== Wolverhampton Wanderers ===
On 13 June 2017, Roderick joined English Championship team Wolverhampton Wanderers on a four-year contract for an undisclosed fee. He made his debut on 5 August, playing the whole of a 1–0 home victory over Middlesbrough.

Roderick continued in the league team for 14 matches, before falling out of favour with manager Nuno Espírito Santo. He finished the season with 19 appearances in all competitions, as Wolves were promoted as champions.

On 11 July 2018, Roderick joined Super League Greece club Olympiacos on a season-long loan. On 1 September 2019, he moved to Famalicão, newly promoted to the Portuguese top division, again on loan. He played regularly as the team finished sixth, scoring two goals, and was sent off in the 34th minute of a 2–2 draw at nearby Braga on 3 November for a foul on Galeno.

=== Later career ===
On 1 February 2021, shortly after agreeing to part ways with Wolverhampton, Roderick moved to Gaziantep of the Turkish Süper Lig on a five-month deal. On 1 October, he agreed to a two-year contract at Melbourne Victory.

Roderick was appointed new team captain in October 2023, replacing the departed Joshua Brillante.

== International career ==
Of Brazilian descent through his parents, Roderick chose to represent Portugal internationally and went on to win 45 caps at youth level. He represented the under-20 team that finished as runners-up at the 2011 FIFA World Cup in Colombia, often partnering Sporting CP's Nuno Reis.

== Career statistics ==
As of match played 25 May 2024

Appearances and goals by club, season and competition
Club	Season	League			National Cup (Note: Includes Taça de Portugal, Swiss Cup, Copa del Rey, FA Cup and Greek Cup)		League Cup (Note: Includes Taça da Liga and EFL Cup)		Other		Total	
Club	Season	Division	Apps	Goals	Apps	Goals	Apps	Goals	Apps	Goals	Apps	Goals
Benfica	2009–10	Primeira Liga	0	0	0	0	1	0	1 (Note: Appearances in UEFA Europa League)	0	2	0
Benfica	2010–11	Primeira Liga	5	0	0	0	1	0	0	0	6	0
Benfica	2011–12	Primeira Liga	0	0	0	0	0	0	0	0	0	0
Benfica	2012–13	Primeira Liga	2	0	0	0	2	0	3	0	7	0
Benfica	Total		7	0	0	0	4	0	4	0	15	0
Servette (loan)	2011–12	Swiss Super League	24	0	3	0	—		—		27	0
Deportivo La Coruña (loan)	2012–13	La Liga	3	0	1	0	—		0	0	4	0
Benfica B	2012–13	Segunda Liga	5	0	—		—		—		5	0
Rio Ave	2013–14	Primeira Liga	18	0	4	0	2	0	—		24	0
Rio Ave	2014–15	Primeira Liga	3	0	3	0	2	0	3	0	11	0
Rio Ave	2015–16	Primeira Liga	18	1	3	0	1	0	—		22	1
Rio Ave	2016–17	Primeira Liga	33	3	0	0	2	1	2	0	37	4
Rio Ave	Total		72	4	10	0	7	1	5	0	94	5
Wolverhampton Wanderers	2017–18	Championship	17	0	1	0	1	0	—		19	0
Olympiacos (loan)	2018–19	Super League Greece	8	0	6	0	0	0	6	0	20	0
Famalicão (loan)	2019–20	Primeira Liga	24	2	4	0	—		—		28	2
Gaziantep	2020–21	Süper Lig	13	0	—		—		—		13	0
Melbourne Victory	2021–22	A-League Men	22	2	2	0	—		1 (Note: Appearances in AFC Champions League)	0	25	2
Melbourne Victory	2022–23	A-League Men	21	0	1	0	—		—		22	0
Melbourne Victory	2023–24	A-League Men	29	1	0	0	—		—		29	1
Melbourne Victory	Total		72	3	3	0	—		1	0	76	3
Career total			245	9	28	0	12	1	16	0	301	10

== Honours ==
Benfica

- Taça da Liga: 2009–10, 2010–11
- UEFA Europa League runner-up: 2012–13

Rio Ave

- Taça de Portugal runner-up: 2013–14
- Taça da Liga runner-up: 2013–14
- Supertaça Cândido de Oliveira runner-up: 2014

Wolverhampton Wanderers

- EFL Championship: 2017–18

Portugal U20

- FIFA U-20 World Cup runner-up: 2011

Individual

- A-Leagues All Star: 2022

Orders

- Knight of the Order of Prince Henry
