= Simon John Costa =

Australian business executive and philanthropist

Simon J. Costa AO
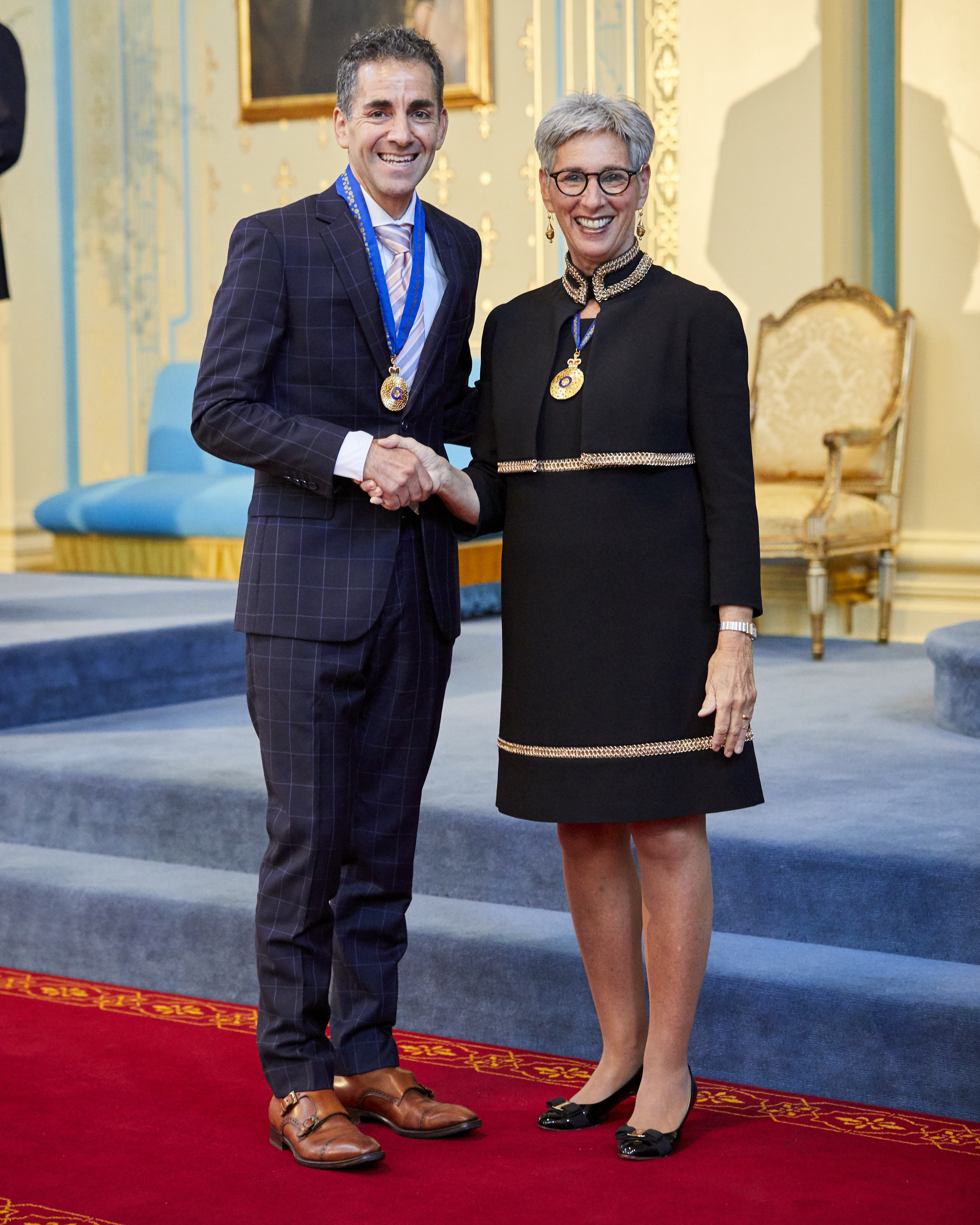
- Costa receiving AO Award in 2019
- Born: Simon John Costa; February 9, 1967 (age 59); Geelong, Victoria, Australia
- Education: Assumption College, Kilmore; Monash University
- Occupations: Business executive Philanthropist

Simon John Costa AO (born 9 February 1967 in Geelong) is an Australian business executive, philanthropist, and humanitarian. He served as the chief executive officer (CEO) and managing director of the Costa Group from 2004 to 2010. He has also held executive roles in nonprofit humanitarian organisations such as the United Nations World Food Programme and the Bluearth Foundation. He has most notably implemented procedures for increasing crop production and reducing post-harvest crop losses for farming communities in Africa.

In 2024 he was awarded the Global Leadership Coach of the Year for his development of business leaders and innovative executive coaching.

== Early life and education ==
Costa was born on 9 February 1967 in Geelong. He completed his secondary education at Assumption College, Kilmore, where he was a boarder from 1981 to 1985. He participated in sports at Assumption College before he suffered a near fatal head injury on the playing field in 1984, causing an early retirement from sports. He also holds an MBA from Monash University.

In February 2015, Costa was among the first group of past students inducted into the Assumption College Hall of Excellence. Costa serves as the president of the Assumption College Old Collegians.

== Career ==
Costa joined the Costa family business in 1992, after spending five years working for other organisations. During his initial years in the company, Costa worked in its retail, wholesale, and export divisions. In 1999, he became chief operating officer (COO) of the Costa Group. During this time, he introduced the 'Character First!' program, designed to promote strong character in the workplace, across the Costa business.

In 2004, Costa succeeded Frank Costa as the CEO and managing director of the Costa Group. Later, he was appointed CEO of the publicly listed Chiquita Brands/Costa Exchange in January 2010, but stepped down as CEO of the Costa Group at the end of 2010. The Costa Group was listed on the Australian Securities Exchange in July 2015.

In 2012 Costa stepped away from all corporate responsibilities to focus on finding solutions for starvation and poverty in developing countries. Costa volunteered with the United Nations to help improve the lives of farming communities in sub-Saharan Africa. A study conducted in conjunction with MIT University (Boston) and USAID revealed postharvest education and new technologies introduced by Costa’s team resulted in a 98% reduction in crop losses, resulting in reduced poverty and starvation in the region.

== Philanthropy ==
Costa has been involved in charitable initiatives throughout his career. He has served as an executive board member of VicRelief and Foodbank. In 2004, he cycled 1,100 kilometres across Europe to raise funds for muscular dystrophy treatments and for the Very Special Kids charitable foundation.

=== Humanitarian work ===
In July 2008, Costa climbed Mount Kilimanjaro in Tanzania to raise funds for Sparrow Village, a treatment center for HIV infected children in South Africa. In 2019, Costa founded Inspiring Leader, an executive coaching firm where 100% of all fees are donated to charity. In 2019, Costa was appointed chairman of the Bluearth Foundation, an organization formed to increase the physical health of Australian communities by promoting physical activity.

In 2012, Costa volunteered for the United Nations World Food Programme as a food security advisor for Sub-Saharan Africa. He implemented a sustainable development strategy for increasing crop production and reducing post-harvest crop losses for farming communities in Africa.

In 2016, Costa was appointed a director of the United Nations World Food Programme.

In 2020, Costa initiated the Hope Project to rescue abused girls in Africa.

In 2025, Costa's work as an international humanitarian was featured in the book The Art of Humanity, celebrating 40 extraordinary Australians who have made significant contributions to the National Identity.

== Personal life ==
Costa family are descendants of Italian and Irish immigrants who moved to Australia in the 1880s. Costa's forefathers originally arrived in Geelong, Victoria, where they founded a retail shop called Covent Garden, dealing in fruits and vegetables. This store served as the primary family business until the 1960s. During that time, Costa's father, Adrian, and his uncle, Frank, decided to expand their business into wholesaling fresh produce. In 1972, Adrian and Mary Costa, his parents, died in a car accident, leaving Costa and his three siblings orphaned.

== Awards and recognition ==
- 2006: Australian Agribusiness Leader of the Year.
- 2015: United Nations WFP Global Innovation Challenge Award for the Most Impactful Humanitarian Innovation
- 2016: Pride of Australia Medal
- 2016: Assumption College Kilmore Hall of Excellence
- 2018: United Nations WFP Innovation Challenge Award.
- 2018: Australian of the Year nominee.
- 2019: Officer of the Order of Australia (AO) for distinguished service to business and humanity
- 2024: Global Leadership Coach of the Year for excellence in executive development
