= Assumption College, Kilmore =

Australian Catholic secondary school

Assumption College

Location
- Sutherland Street 67 ah Kilmore, Victoria 3764; Australia
- Coordinates: 37°18′2″S 144°56′35″E

Information
- Type: Independent Roman Catholic Day and boarding coeducational secondary education institution
- Motto: Quae Supra Quaere (Latin) Seek the Things that Are Above
- Established: 1893; 133 years ago
- Principal: Paul Finneran
- Staff: 140+
- Years offered: 7–12
- Gender: Co-educational
- Enrolment: 1,500 (7–12); 72 boarding students.
- Colours: Royal blue, sky blue, gold
- Affiliation: Associated Grammar Schools of Victoria
- Website: assumption.vic.edu.au

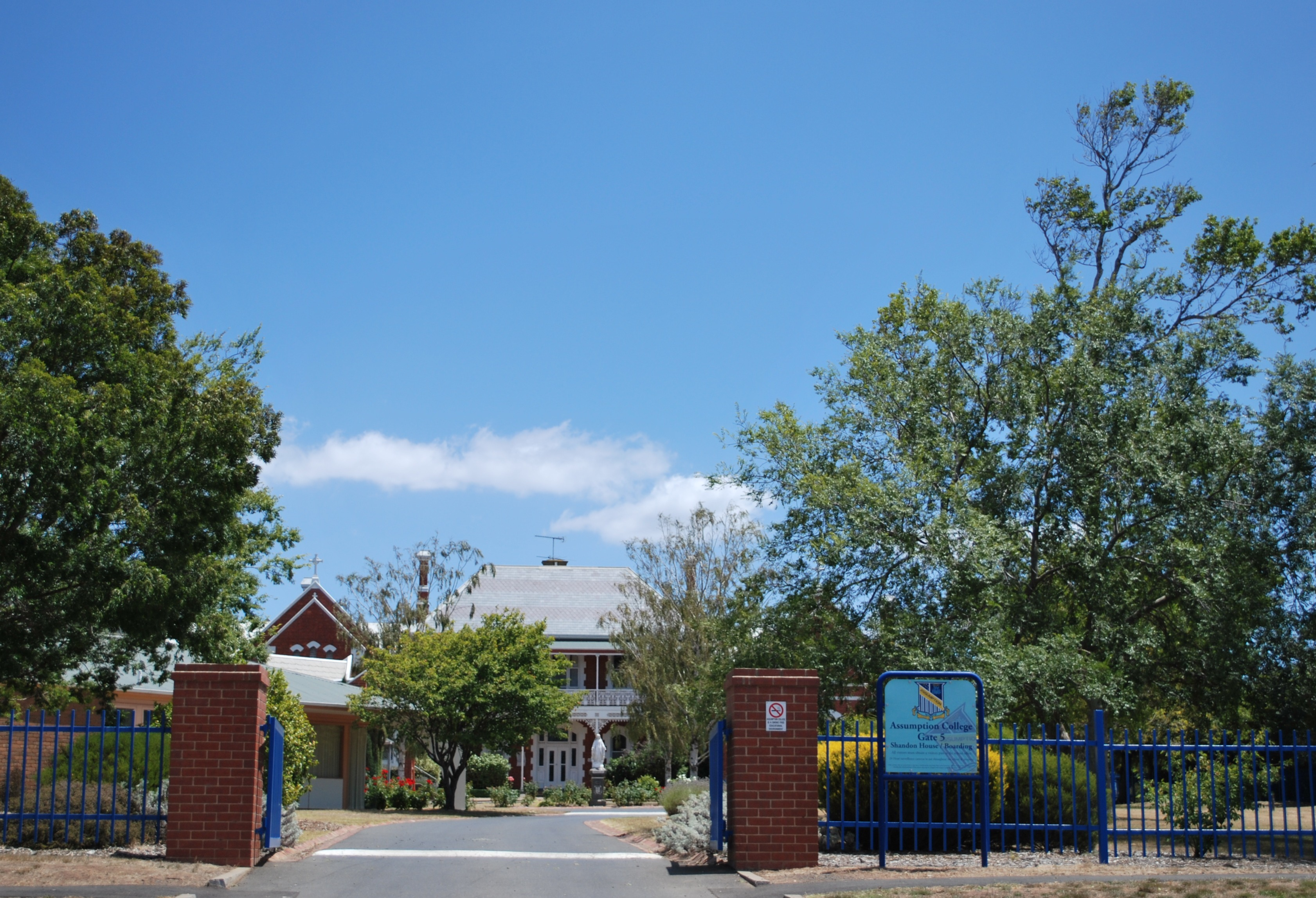
Entrance to Shandon House

Assumption College (often known as ACK, where the K stands for Kilmore) is an Australian Catholic co-educational secondary day and boarding school. The school is located in the town of Kilmore, Victoria. The College was founded in 1893 by the Marist Brothers and is part of a network of Marist schools in Australia and throughout the world.

Assumption College is governed by Marist Schools Australia and is supported by the Catholic Education Commission of Victoria. Assumption became a member of the Associated Grammar Schools of Victoria (AGSV) in 1958 which provides a broad sporting competition for students. Since 2000, girls sport has been supplemented through membership of the Associated Public Schools of Victoria (APS) competition.

== History ==
The Marist Brothers order was established as a teaching order in France in 1817 by Father Marcellin Champagnat (1789–1840), with a goal of providing elementary education to underprivileged rural children. The Marist Brothers were invited to Australia by the Archbishop of Sydney, arriving in 1872. They changed their goals and opened elite secondary schools, for which significant fees were charged, and they diverted monies from the higher fees to subsidize the education of the less privileged.

The Marist Brothers were invited to Kilmore to start a primary school for local boys in 1893.

Assumption College first took in boarders in 1901 from Catholic families throughout regional Victoria and southern New South Wales. In 1907 the school was registered as Assumption College, Kilmore. The College continued to grow as a boys’ boarding school with a smaller day boys component until 1971, when the first two girls were enrolled. The proportion of day students has progressively grown since the 1970s. Girls began boarding in 1995.

== Principals ==
2006–2014 Michael Kenny
2015–2023 Kate Fogarty
2024– Paul Finneran

== Curriculum ==
Year 7 students are exposed to subjects including design technologies (wood, food, metal and textiles), digital technologies, English, humanities, the sciences, health and physical education, languages (both French and Punjabi) and religious education.

== Co-curriculum ==
Students may become involved in the cultural life of the College, by performing, by singing, playing a musical instrument, acting, dancing or debating.

== Notable alumni ==
For many years Assumption College has been known for its record of producing Australian Football League/Victorian Football League (AFL/VFL) footballers, including several who captained their AFL teams (Francis Bourke, Neale Daniher and Shane Crawford). Shane Crawford also won the prestigious Brownlow Medal.

Many of ACK's former students have been recognised in the Assumption College Hall of Excellence.

=== Film, literature, media and business ===
Tony Armstrong (television presenter and AFL player)
Jeremy Burge (founder of Emojipedia)
Robbie Coburn (poet)
Simon John Costa (former CEO of Costa Group)
Tony MacNamara (film director, producer and screenwriter)
Fred Schepisi, AO (film director, producer and screenwriter)
Emma-Louise Wilson (actress)

=== Politics ===
Sam Birrell (Federal MP for Nicholls)

=== Sport ===
Michael Barlow (AFL/VFL)
Francis Bourke (AFL/VFL)
John Brady (AFL/VFL)
Billy Brownless (AFL/VFL)
Francis Bourke (AFL/VFL)
Shane Crawford (AFL/VFL)
Peter Crimmins (AFL/VFL)
Neale Daniher (AFL/VFL)
Ben Dixon (AFL/VFL)
Simon O'Donnell (cricket and VFL)
Richard Douglas (AFL/VFL)
Brendan Edwards (AFL/VFL)
Jim Gallagher (AFL/VFL)
Ray Garby (AFL/VFL)
Hugo Garcia(AFL)
Michael Green (AFL/VFL)
Kevin Heath (AFL/VFL)
Jason Johnson (AFL/VFL)
Peter "Crackers" Keenan (AFL/VFL)
David King (AFL/VFL)
Tom Lonergan (AFL/VFL)
Bernie McCarthy (AFL/VFL)
Peter McCormack (AFL/VFL)
Dion Prestia (AFL/VFL)
Gabrielle Richards (basketball)
Laurie Serafini (AFL/VFL)
Greg Stockdale (AFL/VFL)
Daniel Talia (AFL/VFL)
Barry Young (AFL/VFL)

== Old Collegians Association ==
The College has an active Old Collegians Association. Its functions include support for the College, arranging social functions and regional reunions, facilitating class reunions and contributing to the College magazine Shandon Calls.

=== Old Collegians Football Team ===
In 1964, the Old Collegians Association entered a team in the Victorian Amateur Football League (VAFL) with some early success. However, because many old collegians return to live in rural Victoria and NSW, maintaining a stand-alone team has proven difficult. Since 2011, the Old Collegians team has participated in the VAFL as Prahran Football Club. The team has been successful, as it won Division 2 in 2018 and is currently playing in Division 1.

== See also ==
- List of schools in Victoria
- List of high schools in Victoria
