= Richard Wilson (Australian businessman) =

Australian businessman

- Born: Melbourne,
- Occupation: director of Melbourne Victory FC
- Known for: Chief executive officer and director, Melbourne Victory FC

Richard Wilson is an Australian business man from Melbourne, Australia, who is known for being a former managing director of Melbourne Victory. He is the current club chairman of Balwyn Football Club, a non-executive director of the Victory

== Melbourne Victory ==
Wilson was a foundation director of Melbourne Victory, a Melbourne football club. He was appointed CEO in 2011–12 A-League pre-season, after the resignation of inaugural CEO Geoff Miles. On 5 June 2013 Wilson resigned his post as CEO with consent of the board of directors. He will remain on the board as a director and will remain a major shareholder of the club. Wilson has overseen a period of change at the club, which included the sacking of A-League championship-winning coach Ernie Merrick in early 2011, following a 1–5 defeat at the hands of Japanese giants Gamba Osaka. He signed Harry Kewell with the help of Anthony Di Pietro. He claimed in his post resignation interview that "It has certainly been an honour to lead the club that I care so much about and to have undertaken and actioned such significant and positive change." Di Pietro said "the Board and executive of Melbourne Victory have been privileged to have had someone of the calibre of Richard Wilson to administer the club. As Managing Director, Richard led the restructuring of the management team and the Football Department, including the appointment of a new Head Coach, Ange Postecoglou, and a reinvigorated playing list of existing and new footballers, that continues to be Australia's most successful A-League club." Richard's former CEO role was taken by former Australian rules football club Essendon CEO, Ian Robson.
