= Melbourne Victory FC =

Australian association football club

Melbourne Victory
- Full name: Melbourne Victory Football Club
- Nicknames: Big V Boys in Blue; Dark Blues; Victory; The Vuck
- Short name: MVFC
- Founded: 28 October 2004; 22 years ago
- Ground: AAMI Park
- Capacity: 30,050
- Owner: Melbourne Victory Limited
- Chairman: John Dovaston
- Head coach: Giovanni Savarese
- League: A-League Men
- 2025–26: 4th of 12; Finals: Elimination-finals
- Website: melbournevictory.com.au
Home colours	Away colours

Melbourne Victory Football Club is an Australian professional association football club based in Melbourne, Victoria. Competing in the country's premier men's competition, the A-League Men, under licence from Australian Professional Leagues (APL), Victory entered the competition in the inaugural season as the only Victorian-based club in the newly revamped domestic Australian league.

Recognised as the second most successful club in the league to date, Victory has won four A-League Championships, three A-League Premierships, one Pre-Season Challenge Cup and two Australia Cups, the only club to have won all four domestic trophies in the modern era of Australian association football. They have also competed in the AFC Champions League on seven occasions, most recently in 2020. Their furthest placement in the tournament was in the 2016 campaign and 2020 campaign, where they were knocked out in the Round of 16 by the eventual champion on both occasions.

The club's home ground is the Melbourne Rectangular Stadium, currently known as AAMI Park for sponsorship purposes, a 30,050-seat stadium on Olympic Boulevard in Melbourne's city centre. The Victory has previously played its home matches at other stadiums throughout Melbourne and surrounding areas, including Olympic Park Stadium, Docklands Stadium and Kardinia Park.

Although Victory is supported across the whole Melbourne metropolitan area, as well as regional cities in the state, it is based primarily in the city centre. The club has rivalries with Melbourne City (the Melbourne Derby), Sydney (The Big Blue), Adelaide United (The Original Rivalry), and Western United (the Westgate Derby/the Battle of the Bridge). The club's all-time leading goalscorer is Archie Thompson, with 97 goals to his name in all competitions. Leigh Broxham has the record for most matches played, with 405 appearances for the Victory.

== History ==
=== Beginning (2004–2005) ===
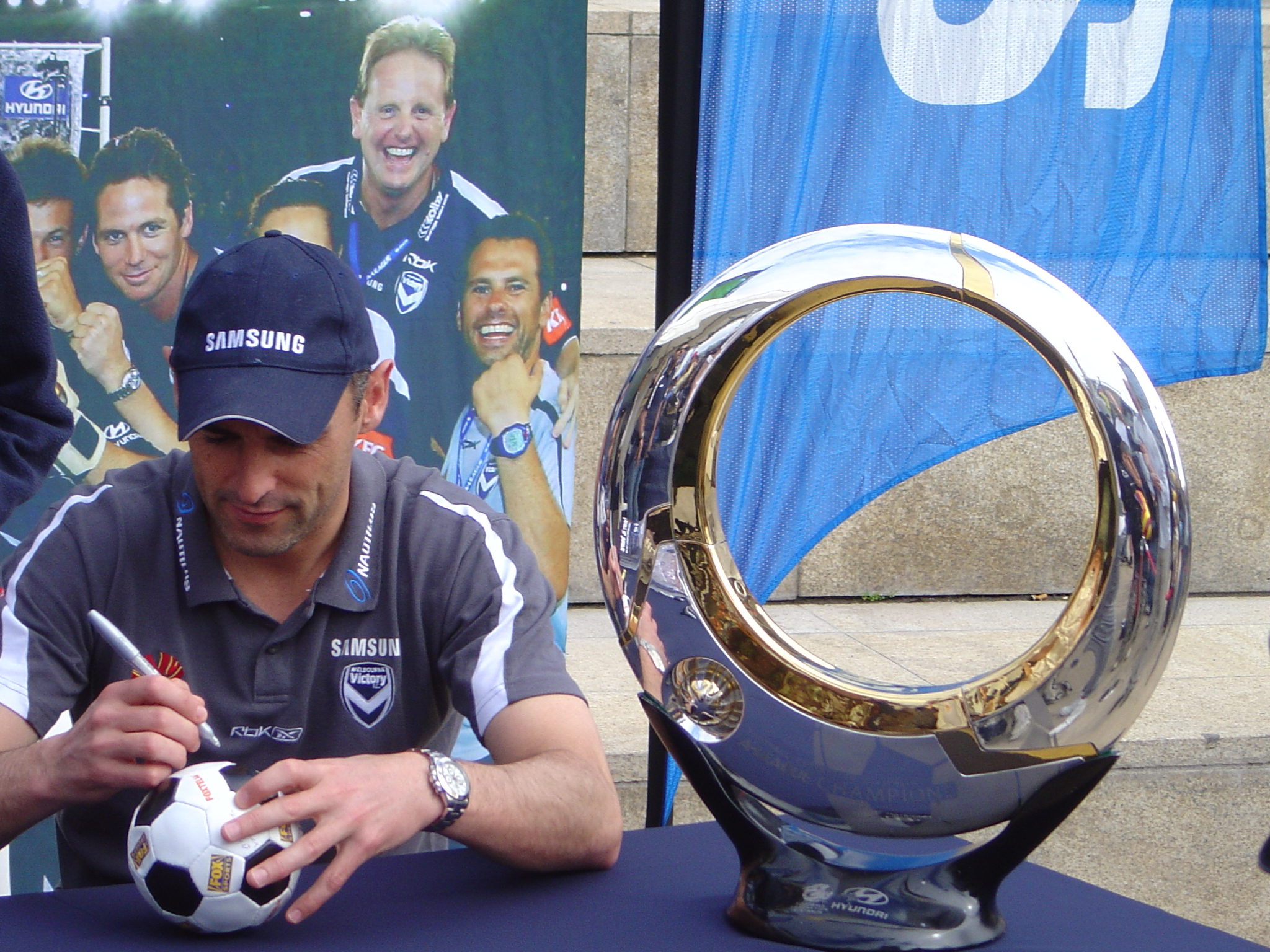
Inaugural captain Kevin Muscat in 2007 with the A-League championship trophy, who would lead Melbourne to success as a captain and later manager.

Following the demise of the National Soccer League, Australia's first national Association football first tier competition, Melbourne Victory Football Club was unveiled as Melbourne's representative of the newly established A-League, along with seven other foundation clubs on 1 November 2004. Established as an unlisted public company, inaugural chairman Geoff Lord of Belgravia Leisure Pty Ltd was the largest financial backer of the club with support from other Melbourne-based business men consisting of Ron Peck, John Harris, future chief executive officer Richard Wilson, and future chairman Anthony Di Pietro. Despite a diverse range of owners of different industry backgrounds, the consortium managed to raise only $4.5 million of the $5 million budget minimum set by Football Federation Australia, thus resulting in the federation depositing the needed $500,000 to obtain the license with the condition of imposing one board member performing duties in the best interests of the federation to ensure return on investment.

The inaugural manager was Ernie Merrick who had signed his former Sunshine George Cross defender Kevin Muscat to be inaugural captain, alongside marquee Archie Thompson, both of whom would become legends of the club in their own right. The club's first competitive match was against Newcastle Jets on 22 July 2005 in round one of the A-League Pre-Season Challenge Cup, finishing in a 1–1 draw in Newcastle. The club's first competitive home game would also prove to be the club's first win on 30 July 2005 in a 3–0 against Perth Glory in the cup's second round at Olympic Park.

=== Merrick Era and early glory (2005–2011) ===

2008 Pre-Season Cup Final Starting XI

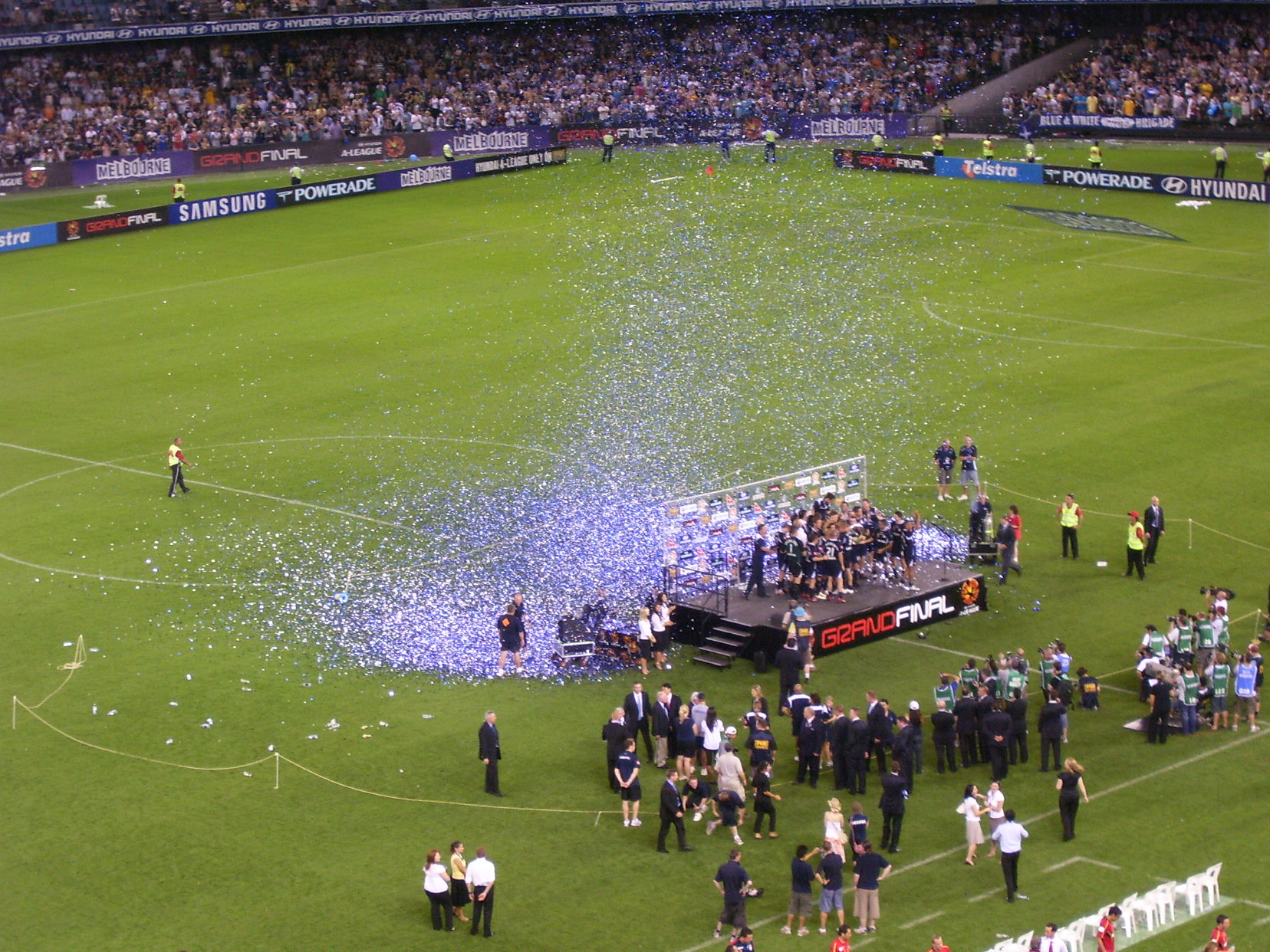
Melbourne celebrating their first championship victory in the 2007 final.

The league's inaugural season of 2005–06 proved to be a disappointment in conclusion but also a glimpse into the glory that would follow in 2006–07 and 2008–09 seasons, with the club being first on the ladder mid-season but ultimately finishing second last. Future team of the decade players Danny Allsopp, Leigh Broxham, Archie Thompson, Grant Brebner, Adrian Leijer, Rodrigo Vargas, Michael Theoklitos under captain Kevin Muscat and manager Ernie Merrick would achieve glory in winning its first league premiership and championship in the 2006–07 season, qualifying for its inaugural AFC Champions League. Archie Thompson in A-League history is synonymous with the glory of famously scoring the first five goals in the 6–0 grand final win over Adelaide United in front of a current record crowd for a grand final of 55'436 at Docklands Stadium. The heavy defeat for Adelaide as well as an altercation between Muscat and manager John Kosmina earlier in the season is culturally seen as the beginning of the rivalry, earning the nicknames 'the cross-border rivalry' and 'the original rivalry'.

The 2007–08 season proved to be another disappointment with Victory narrowly missing the finals. Hindered by multiple injuries throughout the season and the inexperience of time & energy management whilst trying to compete in the club's inaugural AFC Champions League campaign of 2008 at full strength, Melbourne narrowly missed the finals but the season did bring long term positives. The acquisition of future team of the decade players Carlos Hernández, Matthew Kemp, and Tom Pondeljak would ensure on-field strength for next three seasons. The 2008–09 season brought more success for the club in achieving its first treble. The last A-League Pre-Season Challenge Cup of 2008, finishing top of the ladder as premiers resulting in qualifying a second time in the AFC Champions League for the 2010 campaign, and being crowned champions after defeating Adelaide United a second time in a grand final in front of a crowd of 53,273, which as of January 2019, is still the second largest attendance for an A-League grand final behind the 2007 final. The 2009–10 season saw Victory be serious competitors for first position but would ultimately and narrowly finish behind Sydney FC, whom Victory would lose 2–4 on penalties in the grand final weeks later. It would prove to be the last grand final for manager Ernie Merrick and for Kevin Muscat as captain, with Victory finishing fifth for the 2010–11 season, and losing to Gold Coast in first round of the finals.

=== Exit Lord, enter Di Pietro, and the rebuild (2011–2013) ===
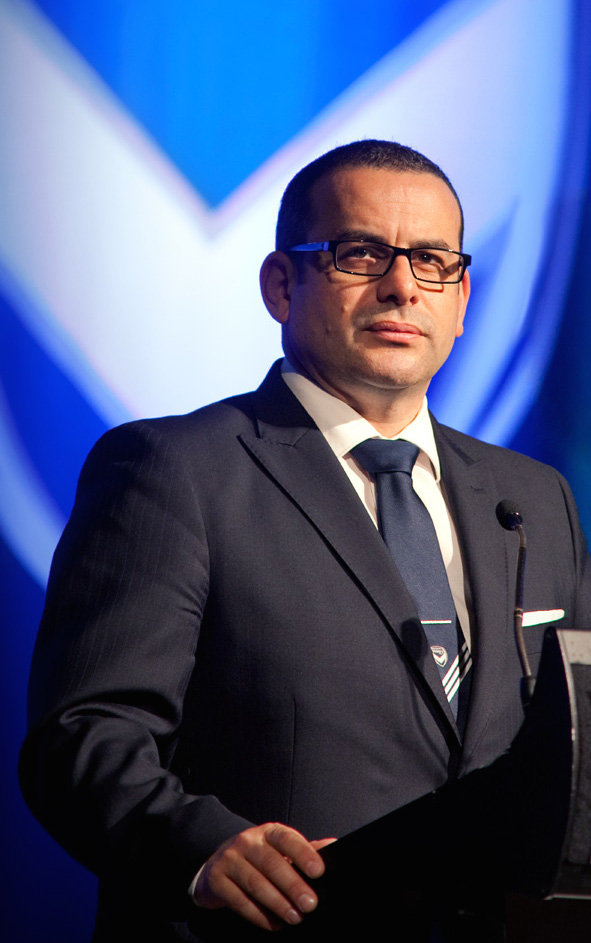
Longest-standing president Anthony Di Pietro speaking at a Victory in Business Luncheon at the Crown Paladium ballroom.

The conclusion of the 2010–11 A-League season saw inaugural president Geoff Lord resign from the club, hailing from the success of two championships, two premierships and the last pre-season challenge cup. Fruit and vegetable heavyweight and shareholder Anthony Di Pietro became the second president in the club's history, hired internally after being an inaugural director alongside Lord from the beginning. Di Pietro was also an occasional stand-in president when Lord was unable to perform duties due to illness on multiple occasions in 2011, making his first public speech ever being stand in chairman at the time during a Victory in Business luncheon at the Crown Palladium Ballroom. Along with the resignation of Lord, inaugural chief executive officer Geoff Miles also resigned from the club, with mortgage firm businessman, shareholder and inaugural director Richard Wilson being hired internally prior to the 2011–12 season alongside Di Pietro. Ernie Merrick would depart as coach after Di Pietro & Wilson quickly sacked Merrick following multiple missed targets both on & off the field, with the 5–1 loss to Gamba Osaka in the 2011 AFC Champions League campaign being the last straw. Merrick would be replaced by Mehmet Duraković and later Jim Magilton for the 2011–12 season. Kevin Muscat had announced during the respective season that he would retire as a player, and immediately became an assistant coach replacing Aaron Healy. Along with Merrick & Healy's departures would be inaugural director of football Gary Cole, and would be replaced by former team South Melbourne and Socceroo teammate, Francis Awaritefe.

The two new-coming executives famously won the race against Sydney FC and other clubs world-wide to sign Socceroos hero Harry Kewell to the club, being declared at the time 'the biggest signing in the history of Australian sport' at the time. With much anticipation for the lead up to the 2011–12 A-League season, the season proved to be a disappointment in missing the finals for the time third in the club's history. Multiple aged players, a less experienced revamped coaching team led by Mehmet Durakovic who was promoted by default that would later be replaced mid-season by Jim Magilton, and a high maintenance Harry Kewell all contributed to the team falling short on multiple match day results. Late in the season, Magilton would sign future team of the decade players Mark Milligan and Adama Traoré. Durakovic's unsung legacy on the club would be the signing of then nineteen year-old Lawrence Thomas, who would later win multiple championships with the club under Kevin Muscat. Despite the disappointment, the lessons were learned and the club would have its most improved season to date as of 2019, finishing third in the 2012–13 season from eighth in the season prior, narrowly losing the preliminary final to premiers and eventual champions Central Coast Mariners 0–1. The season started with a major sense of optimism by signing by multiple Brisbane Roar and National Soccer League premiership and championship-winning coach Ange Postecoglou on a three-year deal, revamping the playing squad with the departure of fourteen players and the signings of fifteen players, including Gui Finkler and Nathan Coe who would achieve multiple club and personal accolades respectively in their own rite in the years to come.

=== Coaching Disruptions (2013–14 season) ===
Prior to the season, coach Ange Postecoglou had just begun the second year of his three-year contract with the club, but had also been cited as a possible replacement for departing Australian national team coach Holger Osieck, in the lead-up to the 2014 FIFA World Cup. This possibility became a reality the day before the round three clash against Postecoglou's former club Brisbane Roar on 25 October, which was his last match in charge. Victory were denied a compensation claim of one million Australian dollars for the early departure.

=== Muscat era and glory again (2013–2019) ===

2015 FFA Cup Final Starting XI

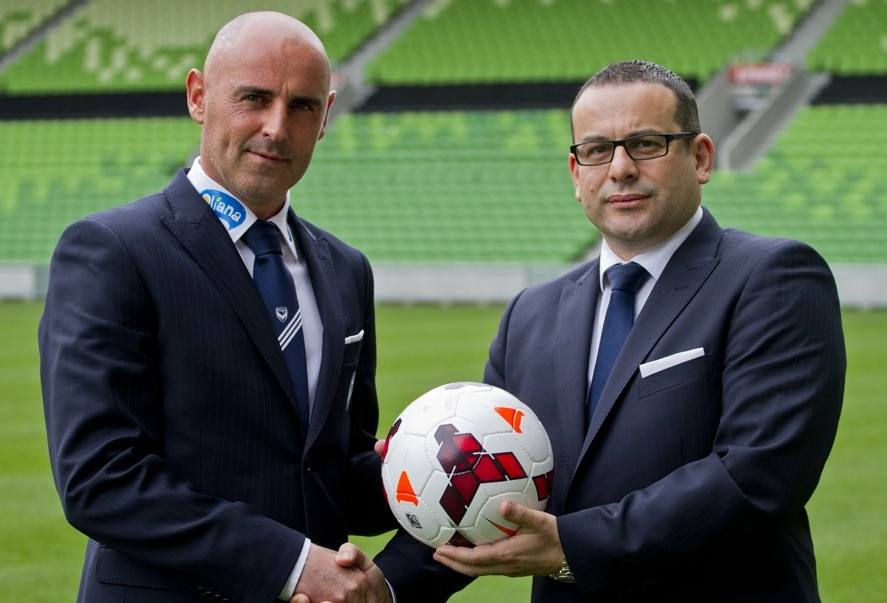
Anthony Di Pietro alongside Kevin Muscat at Melbourne Rectangular Stadium in October 2013

The era of Kevin Muscat becoming the first former player and captain to become manager began sooner than anticipated, but it would be an era that would restore the former early glory of Australia's biggest association football club. The era officially began following the untimely departure of Ange Postecoglou in round four of the 2013–14 season on 4 November 2013, in a 3–2 home victory over Wellington Phoenix at Docklands Stadium. Future grand final winners James Troisi, Kosta Barbarouses and Rashid Mahazi were signed to the club and would help strengthen the playing squad in the years to come. Muscat's first season would end in both heartbreak and controversy as Victory were denied obvious penalty decisions in the last minutes of both the A-League finals clash against Brisbane Roar, and in the last group stage clash against Jeonbuk in the 2014 AFC Champions League, when in both games one extra goal was needed to win. Both controversial moments occurred only days in between each other, resulting in Muscat heavily criticizing referees in general.

The 2014–15 season saw a major recruiting drive in the signings of Besart Berisha, Carl Valeri, Daniel Georgievski, Fahid Ben Khalfallah and Mathieu Delpierre, who would all go onto achieve multiple personal and club accolades respectively. Late in the season on 28 March 2015, the club announced its team of the decade at the Crown palladium ballroom with five of the announced players still contracted to victory at the time, with then coach Kevin Muscat also being listed. This time of the season also saw captaincy of the club change with Adrian Leijer departing the Victory for Chinese Super League club Chongqing Lifan on an undisclosed transfer for a major salary increase, with teammate Mark Milligan becoming interim captain for the remainder of the season. After a six-year wait, Victory would finish first on the ladder and would later defeat Sydney FC 3–0 in the grand final. Team of the decade substitute goalkeeper Nathan Coe, who would miss the grand final due to injury announced his retirement shortly after the achievement.

The next two seasons were of mixed results, but the squad would remain competitive and be rewarded. The 2015–16 season was of mixed results in the A-League, but the squad would win the 2015 FFA Cup, and for the first time in the club's history, would progress to the round of sixteen in the Asian Champions League. Captain and marquee Mark Milligan departed the club during the preseason and was replaced by 2014 World Cup teammate Oliver Bozanic, with Carl Valeri given the captaincy role. Defender Thomas Deng would be promoted from the youth squad and feature occasionally throughout the season. Veterans Mathieu Delpierre and Archie Thompson retired at the season's conclusion and Deng would be loaned to Jong PSV, but the season would be mostly remembered for newly promoted captain Carl Valeri contracting a brain inflammation in December 2015, but would later return in the finals. The 2016–17 season saw an improvement in results in the A-League, with the squad finishing second on the ladder, ultimately losing in what was a demoralising defeat in the grand final to their superior rivals and premiers Sydney FC, making both clubs equal in premierships and championships. The season saw the returns of James Troisi and team of the decade winger Marco Rojas. Defender James Donachie joined from Brisbane Roar, and the club's youth squad would promote Christian Theoharous and Stefan Nigro.

The 2017–18 season ended in glory but would see multiple difficulties in the lead up to the finals. In the preseason, 2017 grand final Johnny Warren medalist Daniel Georgievski departed the club willfully, with Marco Rojas and Nick Ansell both being sold. Rhys Williams and Leroy George signed in the preseason and would prove to be crucial players. With mixed results throughout the season, coach Kevin Muscat was criticised for his 'stale' game plan. Mid-season, captain Mark Milligan and defender Jason Geria would both be sold, and Terry Antonis would join the club on a two-and-a-half-year deal. Despite pressure, the squad gained form towards the end of the season despite losing to premiers Sydney FC away at Sydney Football Stadium in the last round and finished fourth. Victory would beat Adelaide United in the elimination final 2–1, led by future coach Marco Kurz at Melbourne Rectangular Stadium, to then face Sydney FC in the semi-final away. In the lead up to the clash, Sydney captain Alex Brosque told the Sydney Morning Herald when asked regarding the reverse fixture with victory that "I know they'll be thinking about it as much as they'll try to forget about it." also stating that "It gives us a lot of confidence and psychologically I'm sure it will be playing on their minds,". In the warm up of the game, crucial defender Rhys Williams suffered an ankle injury that would rule him out of the game and the grand final if Victory would win. The Victory as underdogs would beat Sydney 3–2 in extra time, with victory physically scoring all five goals, with own goals by Stefan Nigro and Terry Antonis. Despite the unfortunate error, Nigro's efforts in the match being a late replacement for the injured Williams would secure him a start in the grand final. Antonis, a former youth product and five seasoned player of Sydney, conceded the own goal in the last minute of regular time to bring the score to 2–2, leading to extra time. In the 117th minute, loanee teammate Kenny Athiu would pass the ball to Antonis, surviving three tackle attempts in running from the centre line to within Sydney's eighteen yard box to score the winning goal, in what would later be recognised as the club's 2017–18 goal of the season. Victory would travel to Newcastle to face second placed Newcastle Jets, led by former and inaugural Victory manager Ernie Merrick. It would be the A-League's first ever regional grand final as well as one manager versing his former player as a manager in a grand final, and would be remembered for its controversy. Victory scored the earliest ever goal in a grand final from a Leroy George free kick that would be headed into the centre of the eighteen yard box by James Donachie then scored by Kosta Barbarouses in the ninth minute. Replays had shown that Donachie was offside upon George kicking the ball, but with the views of the linesman deceived by a Newcastle defender, the goal was allowed to stand as the video assistant referee had temporarily failed. Victory would win 1–0 against a ten men Newcastle after striker Roy O'Donovan desperately attempted to volley a high altitude ball from a free kick that infamously resulted in goalkeeper Lawrence Thomas being kicked in the face causing an altercation to follow. The incident resulted in a ten match ban for O'Donovan going into the 2018–19 season despite an appeal. Thomas later told The Guardian that he had accepted O'Donovan's immediate apology after full-time. The achievement made Victory leaders in the number of championships won by an A-League club, as well as being the first team to win a grand final after finishing fourth place in the regular season, the lowest ladder position. Weeks later, six grand final players departed the club, including Besart Berisha being sold for an undisclosed fee to Sanfrecce Hiroshima.

Despite the unexpected grand final achievement, Muscat would commence a recruiting drive that would see eight players join preseason, including 2018 World Cup players and Keisuke Honda and Ola Toivonen. Mid-season transfers saw the undisclosed sale of Nick Ansell, and the recruitment of Elvis Kamsoba and Anthony Lesiotis, this first ever former Melbourne City player to represent Victory. Despite being more competitive than the season prior considering that Honda was sidelined more over a third of the season with injury, it would ultimately end in disappointment. The squad would finish third by one point behind the second placed and eventual champions Sydney FC, meaning that Victory would not receive direct entrance into the group stage of the 2020 AFC Champions League, but would have to enter a play-off first. The true realization of the disappointment in finishing third would be realised in the semi-final against Sydney away, who would exact revenge for their 2017–18 semi final upset in which Victory were defeated 1–6 away. Despite having one more season on his contract, Muscat resigned from the club weeks later for personal reasons, closing a fourteen-year stint at the club as a player, captain, assistant manager, and head coach.

=== Post-Muscat era (2019–2021) ===
Following Muscat's early departure, the Melbourne Victory board interviewed multiple foreign and local coaches for the senior role. It was announced in late June 2019 that former Adelaide United coach Marco Kurz was signed on a two-year deal. During the recruitment process, nine players departed the club, including the retirement of captain Carl Valeri who would become an office administrator for the club. Eight senior players were signed including the return of team of the decade defender Adama Traoré, and the youth academy had promoted defensive players Benjamin Carrigan and Brandon Lauton. In early October, weeks before the first round of the 2019–20 season, Ola Toivonen was appointed captain.

In January 2020, after just 6 months in the role Kurz was dismissed by the club. Kurz left having managed the Victory for just thirteen competitive matches, for four wins, three draws and six losses. The six defeats were the most losses the Victory had suffered after thirteen games of a season. At the time of his dismissal, the Victory were sixth on the league ladder with fifteen points, their equal lowest points tally after thirteen games alongside the 2007–08 and 2011–12 seasons. Assistant coach Carlos Pérez Salvachúa was appointed as caretaker manager of the Victory until the conclusion of the season. However, on 30 May 2020, with 5 regular season A-League matches remaining in Melbourne Victory's season, Salvachúa departed the club to return to Europe to be closer to his family. Assistant coach and former player Grant Brebner was appointed as the Victory's caretaker manager for the remainder of the season; he was later appointed promoted to permanent manager on 24 August 2020.

Brebner's tenure as Melbourne Victory manager coincided with the worst run of results in Melbourne Victory's history. He was sacked as head coach shortly after Victory's 7–0 loss to local rivals Melbourne City in April 2021, a result which came only a month and a half after losing 6–0 to the same team. On 19 April 2021, Victory assistant coach Steve Kean was appointed as interim coach for the remainder of the 2020–21 A-League season as Victory plummeted to 12th place, becoming the first ever A-League side to finish 12th and Victory won their first ever wooden spoon.

=== Popovic era (2021–2024) ===

2021 FFA Cup Final Starting XI

On 22 April 2021, the Victory announced that Tony Popovic will take over as the club's manager from the beginning of the 2021–22 season. On 5 February 2022, the Victory defeated the Central Coast Mariners 2–1 at AAMI Park to win the 2021 FFA Cup, achieving Popovic's first trophy as manager of the club, as well as the Victory's second FFA Cup title. This was the last edition of the competition under the FFA Cup name; from 2022, the competition will be known as the Australia Cup.

In the lead up to the 2022–23 A-League Men season, the club announced the signing of former Manchester United and Portugal national team great Nani on Tuesday 12 July 2022, on a two-year contract, and was allocated the number seventeen jersey. On the following Friday 15 July 2022, the club played against Manchester United at the Melbourne Cricket Ground, as participant in United's 2022 pre-season tour of East Asia. Nani made his unofficial debut as substitute in front of the 74,157 spectators present, with the match finishing in 1–4 loss.

In the lead up to the opening 2022–23 A-League round, commentator Michael Zappone stated that 'for me, they're Melbourne Victory the favourites to win the title this season.'

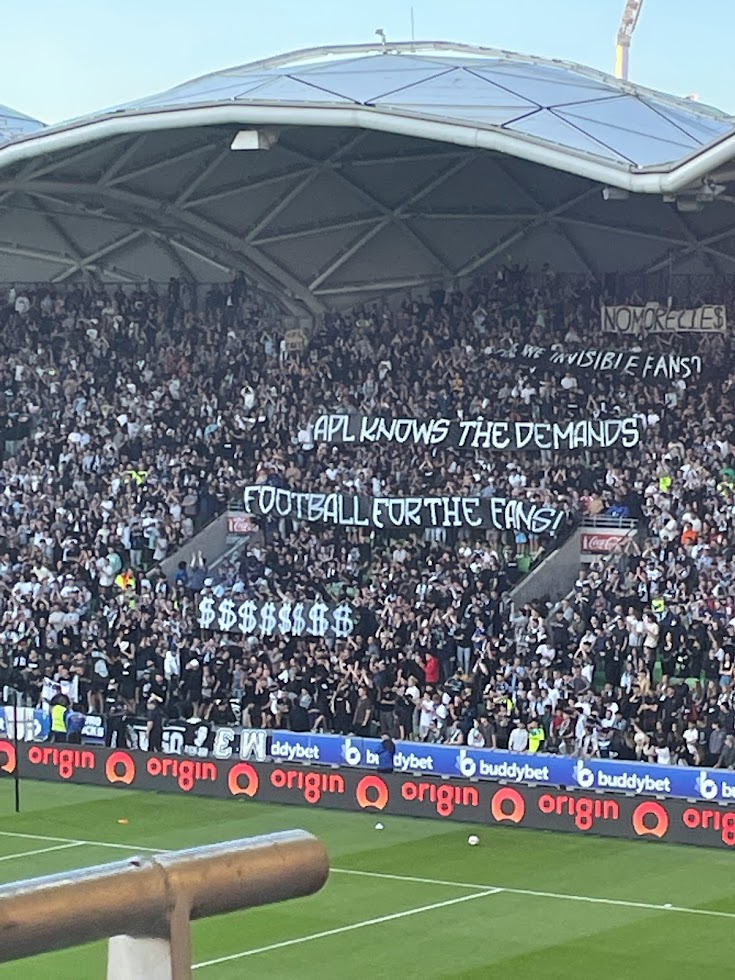
Melbourne Victory supporters protest against the Australian Professional Leagues' A-League Grand Final hosting rights decision during the 40th Melbourne Derby

Following the World Cup break, on 12 December 2022, preceding the Christmas Melbourne Derby fixture, the Australian Professional Leagues announced an agreement with Destination NSW that would see the 2023, 2024, and 2025 A-League Men Grand Finals hosted in Sydney, as opposed to the traditional format of being hosted by the finalist that finished higher during the regular season. This announcement was met with widespread opposition from fans. A 20th minute walkout was staged by the former active groups of both clubs, Original Style Melbourne and City Terrace. In the 20th minute, the match was suspended by referee Alex King as flares were thrown onto both sides of the pitch. Tom Glover threw one of a flare back into the crowd of Victory supporters, sparking a pitch invasion where Glover was struck with a metal bucket. Security, a Channel 10 Cameraman, and referee Alex King were also subject to the violence. The pitch invasion forced the Derby's abandonment in the 22nd minute (score being 1–0 to City) due to concerns with player safety.

On 18 December 2022, Football Australia issued Melbourne Victory with a show cause notice, for the club to show cause on why they should not face serious sanctions for bringing the game into disrepute.

On 23 December 2022, Football Australia imposed interim sanctions on Melbourne Victory while the show cause process was worked through. These sanctions included:

- No tickets sold in respect to Home matches.
- Home and away active bays will be closed.

On 9 January 2023, following interim sanctions by FA which restricted active support, purchase of tickets to the general public and total North end blockage with tarps, the FA handed down the final sanctions to Melbourne Victory for the events at the Christmas Derby, after Melbourne Victory's show cause response was considered.

Football Australia found that Melbourne Victory FC brought the game into disrepute. Sanctions include:

- A total financial sanction of $550,000 AUD
- No organised seating for away fans for the remainder of the season and finals series.
- No organised home active support for the remainder of the season and finals series.
- A suspended 10 point deduction triggered if fan behaviour results in the suspension of a game, ending at the conclusion of 2025/26 A-League season.

In response to the show cause determination by FA, the Club stated that they would not appeal the decision and separately stated that they were ‘committed to the disbandment of any A-League Men's active supporter groups that were recognised at the time of the incident’. The Christmas Derby was resumed on Wednesday 5 April 2023 at the 21st minute, with the game ending 2–1 in favour of Melbourne City.

777Partners invested into Melbourne Victory FC in October 2022. In early February, Melbourne Victory's board approved 777Partners’ purchase of 70% of the club for 5 years.

The first half of Melbourne Victory's 2022–23 season was the worst in the club's history. They would only pick up 12 points in 14 matches and were at the bottom of the ladder.

Consequently, the Club looked to improve the squad in the January transfer window, signing Bruce Kamau, Damien Da Silva, Connor Chapman, Fernando Romero, the permanent signing of Bruno Fornaroli, and resignings of William Wilson, Matthew Bozinovski, and Ben Folami.

On 23 April 2023, Michael Zappone revealed that the Melbourne Victory board had supposedly chosen not to activate a second season clause in Luis Nani's contract, meaning that the marquee player who suffered a partial ACL tear would not return to the club in season 2023–24. However, head coach Tony Popovic stated that a decision has not been made on Nani's future.

Melbourne Victory completed the 2022–23 A-League Men's season with a 1–0 home loss to eventual 8th place Brisbane Roar, narrowly missing out on the wooden spoon which was avoided through a 94th-minute winner by Lleyton Brooks in the previous game against eventual wooden spooners and reigning Australia Cup winners Macarthur FC. Melbourne Victory finished the regular season in 11th place, condemning the club to a third bottom two finish in four years and another Australia Cup qualifier.

On 3 May 2023, the club hosted its annual Victory Medal. Former Melbourne City striker Bruno Fornaroli won the Player's Player of the Year and the TAC Golden Boot. Mid season Ligue 1 import Damien Da Silva won the prestigious Victory Medal, only playing 12 games in the season, a club record. Matthew Bozinovski won the Young Player of the Year award.

On 4 May 2023, following the conclusion of the 2022–23 A-League Men's season, Melbourne Victory announced the departure of first year signings Tomi Juric and 'Kadete', as well as the release of youngster Lleyton Brooks and keeper Matt Acton, who had been at the club for seven years. This would add to the departures of Noah Smith, Jay Barnett, Matthew Spiranovic, and Nick D'Agostino who all departed the club during the season.

On 4 May 2023, almost 5 hours after the departure of four Victory players were announced, the Club confirmed that Fabrizio Cammarata, Luciano Trani and Goalkeeper Coach, Peter Zois would not continue with the senior men's side in the 2023–24 season. The group of coaches were appointed by Tony Popovic when he joined the Club at the start of the 2021–22 season.

Main Melbourne Victory fan podcast For Vucks Sake stated that, in their opinion, the 2022–23 A-League Men's season was 'the worst in the club's history'.

Victory's 2023–24 season was much more successful, finishing third overall on the ladder with 10 wins and 12 draws. After beating Melbourne City in the Elimination Finals on penalties, the team then advanced to the semi-final, beating Wellington Phoenix 2–1 on aggregate, advancing to the Grand Final. With a 3–1 loss to the Central Coast Mariners, Victory finished the season as runners-up.

Following the defeat in the 2024 Grand Final, Popovic was set to accept a pay cut to remain at Melbourne Victory, in light of a contract standoff where Popovic ultimately lost out on the Hajduk Split job he was closely linked to. However, it is rumored he became furious upon discovering John Didulica, who initially lured Popovic to Victory, had been courting the services of Melbourne City legend Patrick Kisnorbo, since May, catalysing his departure from the club.

=== Post-Popovic era (2024–2026) ===
Patrick Kisnorbo was officially appointed Melbourne Victory head coach on 25 June 2024, on a 3-year deal until the conclusion of the 2026/27 A-League Men's Season.

Melbourne Victory released a number of players prior to the appointment of Kisnorbo, including Salim Khelifi, Chris Ikonomidis, Stefan Nigro, Eli Adams, Ahmad Taleb and former Johnny Warren Medalist and Victory Medalist Jake Brimmer. Dual Victory Medalist Damien Da Silva, Connor Chapman, Roly Bonevacia, Ben Folami and Matt Bozinovski shortly followed. Paul Izzo was signed by Danish side Randers. Leigh Broxham retired.

Victory followed by signing Josh Rawlins, Reno Piscopo, Jack Duncan, Jing Reec, Brendan Hamill and Real Madrid product Nikos Vergos, who is estimated to be earning 600k AUD per year on his 2-year deal. They also secured the signing of Australian international goalkeeper Mitch Langerak, who would join the club in January 2025 once his contract with Nagoya Grampus ended. Alex Menelaou, Daniel Graskoski and Luka Kolic were elevated to the first team.

The Kisnorbo era began with early success, going undefeated in all preseason matches and up to the Australia Cup final. Controversially, Kisnorbo completely dropped Daniel Arzani from the squad on the day of the final, stating "it was a selection decision" and not the result of a fallout with the player. However, it is rumoured that Arzani was dropped following a bust-up with Kisnorbo at training. Reportedly, the winger expressed his frustration in front of the whole squad, due to being offered to other clubs in the preseason transfer window. Ultimately, Melbourne Victory suffered a 1–0 loss to Macarthur in the final of the Australia Cup, condemning them to their second major final loss in the same year.

Kisnorbo began the season with a nil-all draw against Central Coast Mariners and then following it up with three wins before getting his first loss of the season during Unite Round against Wellington Phoenix. Kisnorbo would go on to win two more matches making victory place second in the league at that point before shockingly departing the club early on 17 December 2024. Kisnorbo left to become Yokohama F. Marinos as an assistant coach. Victory's fans weren't happy about Kisnorbo leaving right before Victory were going to play Melbourne City in the Melbourne Derby. In response to his departure Victory's main fan podcast For Vucks Sake made an emergency podcast stating there anger toward patrick Kisnorbo. Melbourne Victory's leadership was "disappointed" by Kisnorbo's departure and would be replaced by assistant coach Arthur Diles.

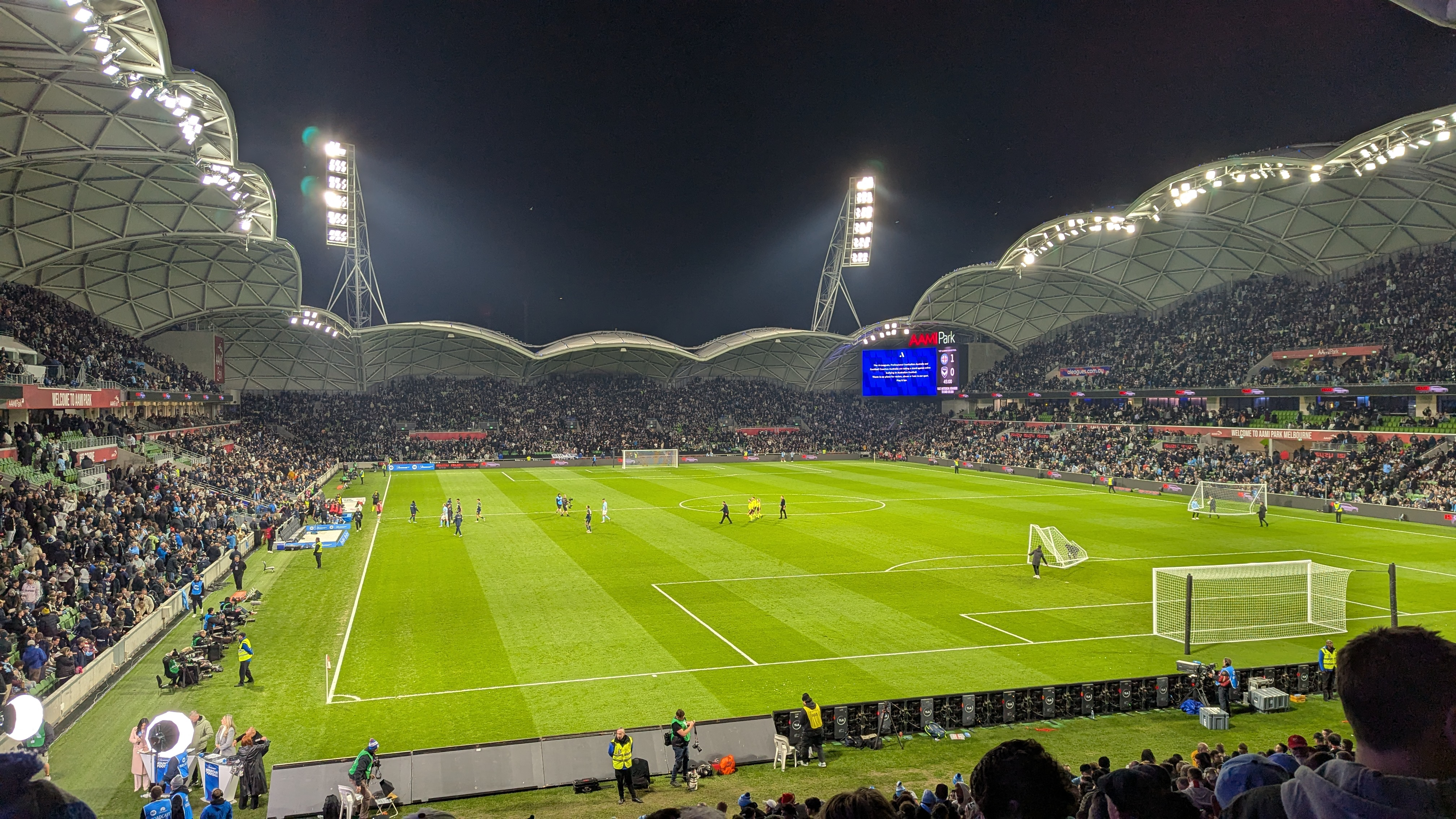
AAMI Park at half time of the 2025 A-League Grand Final.

In the aftermath of Patrick Kisnorbo's departure, Melbourne Victory's leadership acted quick in appointing Arthur Diles as an interim manager of the club. Diles managed his first match against Melbourne City on 21 December 2024. The match resulted in a 1–1 draw in the first match of the post-Kisnorbo era. Diles would fail to get his first win for 6 games until he got his first win against Sydney FC in the Big Blue, beating them 2–0. After the win Diles was announced as Head Coach of the Victory team until the end of the 2025/26 Season. Lachlan Jackson and Alex Badolato was signed by the club and Kasey Bos and Jordi Valadon signed contract extensions. On 13 March 2025, Melbourne Victory would announce that they had reached an agreement with Brighton & Hove Albion owner Tony Bloom to purchase a 19.1% stake in the club, with an ability to increase his ownership over time. Diles would finish the 2024–25 A-League Men regular season placed 5th, qualifying Victory to the Finals series. The first game of the finals would bring Diles' side against the Western Sydney Wanderers in the elimination final. Victory winger Daniel Arzani created both goals, with defender Kasey Bos scoring an early seventh-minute goal, his third in that many games, before the Wanderers reacted with a goal in the 23rd minute. The winner was scored by Zinédine Machach and the match ended 2–1, leading Victory to progress through to the semi-finals. In the week before the semi final Victory would announce on 13 May 2025 that Victory would play Wrexham AFC on 11 July 2025 as a part of Wrexham's tour down under. Victory would play the seasons premiers Auckland FC in a two legged match to decide who would qualify to the Grand Final. The first leg would be played at Melbourne Victory's home of AAMI Park on 17 May 2025. Logan Rogerson would score a lone goal for Auckland leading to the first leg result to finish 1–0 against Diles' squad. The second leg would be played at Auckland's home stadium of Go Media Stadium. The capacity of Go Media Stadium was also increased by 2,700 seats to enable more fans into the stadium. In the week before the second leg, Victory defender Brendan Hamill suffered a rupture of his anterior cruciate ligament (ACL). Diles would make changes to Victory's strategy in the second leg. Auckland would hold strong in the first half but Victory would equalise the aggregate scores with a goal scored by Zinédine Machach in the 55th minute of the match. The winner would be scored by Bruno Fornaroli in the 60th minute of the game to complete the comeback to qualify them to the 2025 A-League Men Grand Final. The match would be played at AAMI Park against the clubs rivals Melbourne City. The match would be the 49th Melbourne Derby. Diles' squad would go into the match without Nishan Velupillay due to him picking up an injury in the clubs previous match against Auckland FC. The Grand final would be played in front of a mostly victory supporting crowd of a record crowd of 29,902. The match would be a hard-fought game by both sides and a goal by Yonatan Cohen to put City ahead in the tenth minute. This goal would be the only one for the game leading to Melbourne City winning 1–0 in the final. This would be the second year in a row where Victory lost the grand final. In the aftermath of the grand final Melbourne Victory's Managing Director Caroline Carnegie told Sharnelle Vella and Bob Murphy from ABC Radio that the heavy police presence painted the team's supporters in a poor light. Carnegie also stated "We're concerned about A-League fans being marred". In a letter to fans on the evening of 2 June 2025, Melbourne Victory chairman John Dovaston said the scenes were "overwhelming and unacceptable".

In the aftermath of the 2024–25 season, Kasey Bos would leave Victory to sign for German club Mainz 05 as well as Ryan Teague signing for Belgian club Mechelen. This would be followed up by former player Franco Lino would sign for Victory on loan from Viking FK. Diles' squad would begin the pre-season for the 2025–26 season by playing Welsh side Wrexham AFC on 11 July 2025. Victory would start the first half by fighting strong against the Welsh side until the 43rd minute, when Thomas O'Connor scored a goal to put Wrexham up 1–0. Wrexham would score 2 more goals in the second half for a 3–0 loss for victory but with a strong effort. Victory would be drawn into the Round of 32 of the 2025 Australia Cup on 1 July 2025. Victory would be drawn to play against Olympic Kingsway for Victory's first competitive game of the 2025–25 season on 29 July 2025. The match would begin with a strong start for Victory as Jordi Valadon would score a goal in the 23rd minute. Kingsway would equalise in the 27th minute after Zinidine Machach caused a penalty from a handball in the box. Keegan Jelacic would score his first goal in the 45+1st minute to put Victory ahead 2–1 at half time. Kingsway would equalise in the 70th minute before Joshua Rawlins got a red card in the 78th minute. Reno Piscopo would score in the 88th minute before Liam Boland would score to put the scores level in the 90+3rd minute and at full time. Liam Boland would score the winning goal in the 101st minute making the scores 4–3 leading to Melbourne Victory's disappointingly early elimination out of the cup. The regular season of the 2025-26 season started Shakey for Diles' squad after a nil-all draw against Auckland FC and 5–2 loss to Australia Cup winners Newcastle Jets. After a win against Perth Glory, Victory would go four games without a win Victory would beat rivals Adelaide United 2–1 at home. This was Victory's first win at home in seven months. On 9 January 2026 Victory would sign Japanese striker Charles Nduka. Nduka was identified through Victory's work with Jamestown Analytics. Melbourne Victory would have a strong second half of the season finnishing 4th at the end of the 2025-26 A-League regular season. Victory would meet rivals Sydney FC in the elimination Final stage of the 2026 A-League finals series. This match would be the first time Victory would meet Sydney since Patrick kisnorbo took the job of Sydney FC coach in March 2026. This was controversial for Victory Fans as he had previously coached victory before shockingly departing the club early on 17 December 2024. In the pre-game, the camera would pan to show Kisnorbo with a large negative response from the Victory fans. To begin the game, Victory would start the game strong but Sydney's defence would hold strong. The half would end scoreless with most chances created by Victory while Sydney's goalkeeper Harrison Devenish-Meares kept a strong performance in goals. This pattern would continue into the second half. Then the referee, after giving a penalty to Victory, as Santos and Paul Okon-Engstler collided, was sent to the pitch-side monitor and decided to overturn his original decision. Three minutes after being substituted on Patrick Wood would capitalise on a mistake by Franco Lino in the 80th minute to put Sydney ahead and would eventually be the difference to win Sydney the game. After the season, star player Juan Mata would win the 2025/26 men's Victor medal. In his acceptance speech, he stated he couldn't "remember the last time that [he] enjoyed football for such a long time". Following the conclusion of the 2025/26 season, the club would confirm the departure of coach Arthur Dilies with managing director, Caroline Carnegie stating, "This is an important time for us to be bold and unapologetic in our ambitions as a Club, and we will look to do just that ahead of next season". On 19 May, the AFC advised Football Australia that Heidelberg United is ineligible to qualify for Australia's 2026/27 AFC Champions League Two direct qualification spot and that Melbourne Victory should take the spot. On 1 June 2026 Victory Player Nishan Velupillay would be selected in the Australian national team squad for the 2026 FIFA World Cup. He would be subbed on in the 61st minute against Turkey and start aggainst the United States.

=== Savarese era (2026–present) ===
On 18 June 2026, Melbourne Victory would announce the appointment of Giovanni Savarese as head coach. The appointment marked a deliberate, bold new direction for Melbourne Victory with Melbourne Victory Managing Director, Caroline Carnegie stating “Giovanni’s appointment reflects a deliberate decision to bring a fresh perspective to the Club. What stood out throughout the recruitment process was not just his attacking football philosophy, but the fact that Giovanni has succeeded in a competition with strong parallels to ours. This in turn comes with experience and confidence that we believe will translate into sustained success in our environment.” and Chairman John Dovaston saying “Giovanni’s appointment reflects the Club’s clear ambition to play a strong, attacking brand of football that excites supporters and challenges for silverware.” Savarese's first competitive match in charge will be the Round of 32 of the 2026 Australia Cup against Kingborough Lions on 26 July 2026. Club captain Roderick Miranda would leave the club on 27 June 2026 leaving after five years with the club. On 29 June 2026 Juan Mata would join the Melbourne Victory ownership group. This would be the start of a long-term commitment to the club. Savarese would start at the club by promoting four youth players in William Kengni, Malik Olukhale, Mikey Ghossaini, and Jack Mihailidis on 2 July 2026. Victory would then sign Harry Shillington from cross-town rivals Melbourne City. And on the 9th of September 2026, Melbourne Victory reached the 2026 Australia Cup Final after defeating Sydney FC 2–0 in the semi-final at Jubilee Stadium on 9 September 2026. Keegan Jelacic opened the scoring in the second minute, before an own goal from Jordan Courtney-Perkins doubled Victory's lead in the second half. The result secured Melbourne Victory's fourth appearance in an Australia Cup final.

== Colours and badge ==
Melbourne Victory's colours are navy blue, white and silver, which encompass the traditional state sporting colours of Victoria. The club's home kit is traditionally all-navy blue, with a white chevron design. Known colloquially as the "big V", it is a symbol associated with the Victoria Australian rules football team. The Victory's away kits have often featured a reversed colour scheme, with white shirts, shorts and socks, alongside a navy blue chevron. Grey and fluorescent yellow have both featured as away kit colours as well.

Currently, the home kit consists of a navy blue shirt with a chevron which fades from white at the bottom to navy blue at the top, paired with navy blue shorts and socks. The away kit is all white, with the shirt featuring a yoke consisting of a design reminiscent of the club's home ground AAMI Park, set inside an off-centre chevron.

A new kit was introduced for the 2008 AFC Champions League due to AFC rules requiring kits to have player numbers on the front of the uniform as well as the back, which would not fit well with the 'V' on the Victory's regular kit. For the 2009–10 season, Melbourne changed their away shirt to be a reverse of their home shirt; white with a blue chevron. In 2010, Melbourne wore the TAC 'seatbelt' shirt against Perth Glory in a charity event to raise awareness for the necessary use of seat belts in cars. Adidas were announced as the club's official kit manufacturer for five years beginning in the 2011–12 season, after the initial deal for Reebok to supply all A-League clubs had expired. The new kits were announced via the club's YouTube channel, and featured a controversial change to a fluoro yellow away shirt. For their 2013–14 kits, Melbourne Victory received backlash from supporters, as the away kits featured a much lighter blue, bearing a large resemblance to fierce rivals Sydney FC.

=== Kit evolution ===
- Home

2005–2007	2007–2009	2009–2011	2011–2013	2013–2015	2015–2016

2016–2017	2017–2018	2018–2020	2020–2021	2021–2022	2022–2023

2023–2024	2024–2025	2025–2026

- Away

2005–2006	2006–2009	2009–2010	2010–2011	2011–2013	2013–2015

2015–2017	2017–2018	2018–2019	2019–2020	2020–2021	2021–2022

2022–2023	2023–2024	2024–2025	2025–2026

=== Logos ===
Regular logo	Reversed
On white backgrounds, the positive, silver-keyline version must be used.	On coloured backgrounds, the reversed, white-keyline version must be used.
Simplified logo – white mono	Simplified logo – navy mono
On coloured backgrounds, a simplified logo can only be used when logo size needs to appear smaller than minimum size or when working with alternative finishes i.e. Foiling, embossing and embroidery.	On white backgrounds, a simplified logo can only be used when logo size needs to appear smaller than minimum size or when working with alternative finishes i.e. Foiling, embossing and embroidery.

=== Sponsorship ===
On 5 December 2005, South Korean electronics giant Samsung became the club's major sponsor in a two-year deal, giving Samsung logo placement on the front and the back of Victory's home and away kits. Prior to the 2006–07 season, KFC were announced as Victory's sleeve sponsor, with their logo appearing on the sleeve of Victory's home and away kits. On 28 January 2009, Samsung announced that they would not renew their sponsorship for the 2009–10 A-League season. Intralot became the Melbourne Victory's new major sponsor when they signed a two-season $2 million contract on 4 May 2009. Their logo subsequently featured on the front of Melbourne Victory's playing strip, starting from the 2009–10 season. On 6 August 2010, it was announced that law firm Florin Burhala Lawyers would be Melbourne Victory's official shorts sponsor for the 2010–11 season. On 1 June 2011, it was announced that human resources company Adecco Group signed a three-year deal as the club's major sponsor, replacing Intralot. As part of the deal, Adecco's logo appeared on the front of the club's playing strip. Melbourne Victory announced on 16 June 2011 that they had signed a five-year deal with global sportswear giant Adidas as the club's official kit manufacturer.

Period	Kit manufacturer	Shirt sponsor (front)	Shirt sponsor (back)
2005–09	Reebok	Samsung	Samsung
2009–11	Reebok	Intralot	La Ionica
2011–12	Adidas	Adecco (home); EnergyWatch (away)	La Ionica
2012–14	Adidas	Adecco (home); Oliana Foods (away)	La Ionica
2014–16	Adidas	Community Training Initiatives (home); Oliana Foods (away)	La Ionica
2016–2017	Adidas	Optislim (home); Builders Academy (away)	La Ionica
2017–2018	Adidas	Optislim & Optivite (home); Freestyle Foods (away)	La Ionica
2018–2021	Adidas	Metricon	La Ionica
2021–2022	Macron	Metricon	La Ionica
2022–2024	Macron	Bonza (regular season); AIA (finals)	La Ionica
2024–25	Macron	Dulux (Australia Cup) Turkish Airlines (regular season)	La Ionica
2025–present	Macron	Value Dental Centres (Australia Cup) Turkish Airlines (regular season)	La Ionica

=== AFC Competition Sponsorship ===
Year	Kit Manufacturer	Shirt Sponsor
2008	Reebok	Samsung
2010	Reebok	Care Park
2011	Reebok	Care Park
2014	Adidas	Oliana Foods
2016	Adidas	Greenwood Capital
2018	Adidas	Metricon
2019	Adidas	No sponsor (group stage matchweek 1 only); TCL
2020	Adidas	Daikin
2022	Macron	Sanctum-X

== Club songs ==
A number of different songs have become synonymous with Melbourne Victory, being both sung by supporters and played over the PA at different moments before, during and after games.

- "Stand By Me" by Ben E. King. This is sung as the team enters the pitch prior to kick-off, with fans holding their scarves above their heads throughout.
- "Seven Nation Army" by The White Stripes. The chorus melody is chanted as a goal celebration, with fans waving their scarves in the air as they sing. It has also been adapted as a player chant for former striker Besart Berisha.
- "Victory The Brave", a rearrangement of Scotland The Brave, penned by Jim Keays of The Masters Apprentices, with Glenn Wheatley helping to compose the song. This song is played after every home win.
- "Freed from Desire" by Gala. In January 2022, Melbourne Victory ran a fan poll to choose a post-match victory song to be played after every Melbourne Victory home win; Freed from Desire received the most votes in the post, becoming the post-match victory song of the club, with the song played after the conclusion of Victory the Brave.

== Stadiums ==
Melbourne Victory currently plays all of its home games at Melbourne Rectangular Stadium, known as AAMI Park for sponsorship purposes.

=== Olympic Park Stadium ===
The club was originally based at the 50-year-old Olympic Park Stadium, where they played all home matches during the 2005–06 A-League season. This stadium had seated areas only on the wings, with standing-room sandy terraces on the north and south ends. The average crowd during the first year was 14,158, 77% of its capacity of 18,500. As a result, the match-day atmosphere would prove to be a marketing asset not just for Melbourne Victory, but also for the rest of the league. It also proved to be a major factor in the club's decision to relocate home games to Docklands Stadium, then known as 'Telstra Dome', from the 2006–07 season onwards, for both safety reasons, and simplicity in membership and match-day attendance expansion. Despite the club permanently relocating to Docklands Stadium, the venue was still used occasionally for both the 2006–07 and 2007–08 seasons, until being permanently closed in 2009.

=== Docklands Stadium ===
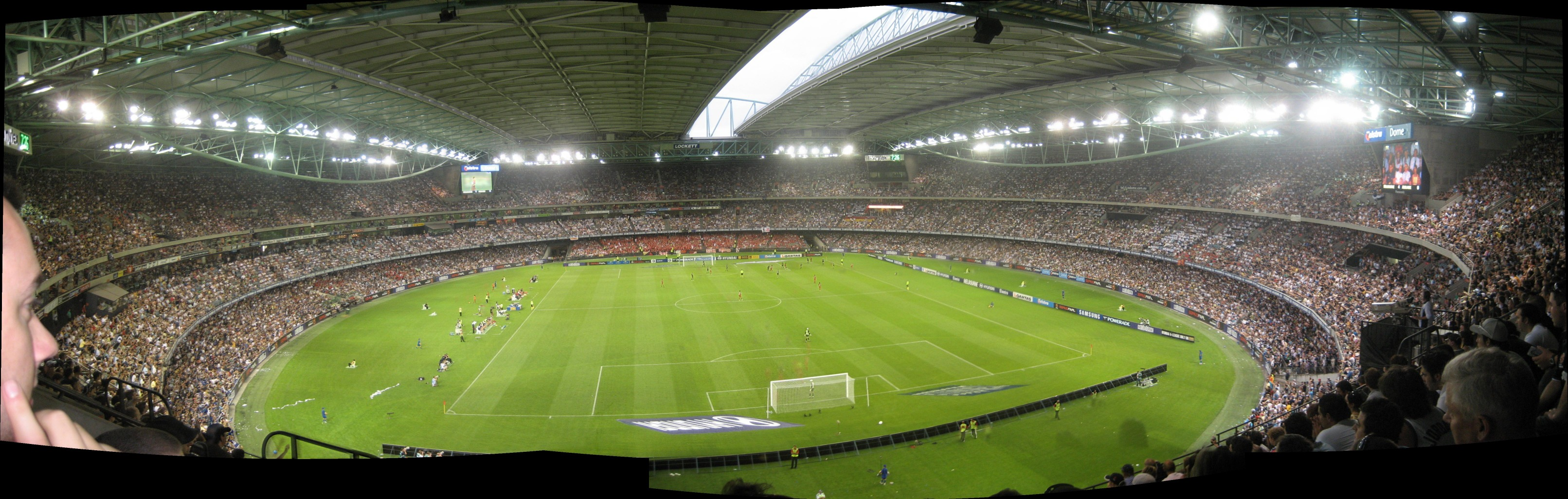
2007 A-League Grand Final at Telstra Dome (now Marvel Stadium)

On 2 September 2006, Melbourne Victory played its first ever match against Sydney FC at the 56,000 capacity Marvel Stadium in a 3–2 victory. The match proved to be a runaway success in terms of crowds, with 39,730 in attendance. As a result, the club moved all but one of their home games to the ground. This move to such a large stadium proved to be an outstanding success, with the Grand Final held there. The average attendance rose to 27,728 for the 2006–07 season, 10,000 above the next highest in the A-League.

During the construction of the Melbourne Rectangular Stadium, Marvel Stadium continued to serve as the club's only home ground until the completion of the club's new permanent home, which began hosting games from the 2010–11 A-League season. On 11 March 2016, it was announced that the club had committed to a further lease of 10 years for the continued use of limited blockbuster matches at the venue, ending at the conclusion of the 2026–27 season. This agreement was mutually ended in July 2021, when the club announced it would no longer play any further home matches at Docklands Stadium and would play every future home match at Melbourne Rectangular Stadium.

To date, Melbourne Victory have celebrated the 2006–07 and 2008–09 premiership and championship victories at the venue. The stadium was also the permanent venue and operational base of the club during the 2008 Pre-Season Cup, although the grand final was won in Wellington, New Zealand.

=== Melbourne Rectangular Stadium ===
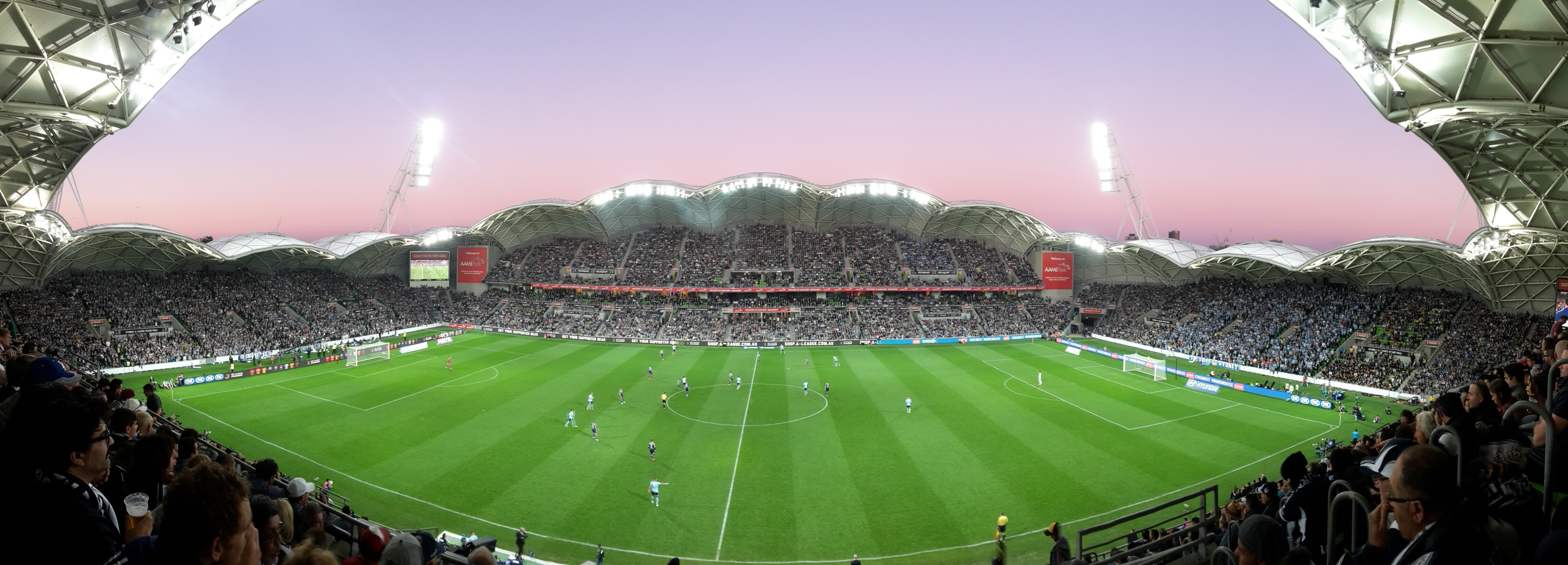
2015 A-League Grand Final at AAMI Park

Prior to the 2006–07 season the club had planned to move to a new $190 million stadium being built to the east of the current Olympic Park complex. The new stadium was originally expected to sit approximately 20,000 spectators (expandable to 25,000) and was to be completed by 2009.

These plans were revised after the Victory refused to commit to playing at such a small capacity stadium. On 23 May 2007, the club announced it had signed as a founding co-tenant of the new stadium, which would now be built to accommodate a maximum of 30,050 spectators with further renovations to 50,000 possible. However, further expansion in the near-term is unlikely as it was discovered during Australia's World Cup Bid process that to build such an expansion would be prohibitively expensive.

Today, the venue is the home of the club's operations, administration, and the majority of the senior team's home matches, as well as occasional home matches of the NYL/NPL & W-League teams. The club currently holds the highest attendance of any association football (soccer) match played at the venue, and second overall for any sporting event at the venue. The record was set in the 2015 A-League Grand Final on 17 May 2015, with an attendance of 29,843 witnessing Melbourne win its third title, and first at the venue in the club's history. The venue was also the place of celebration with club celebrating the 2014–15 premiership and the 2015 FFA Cup victories.

=== Kardinia Park ===
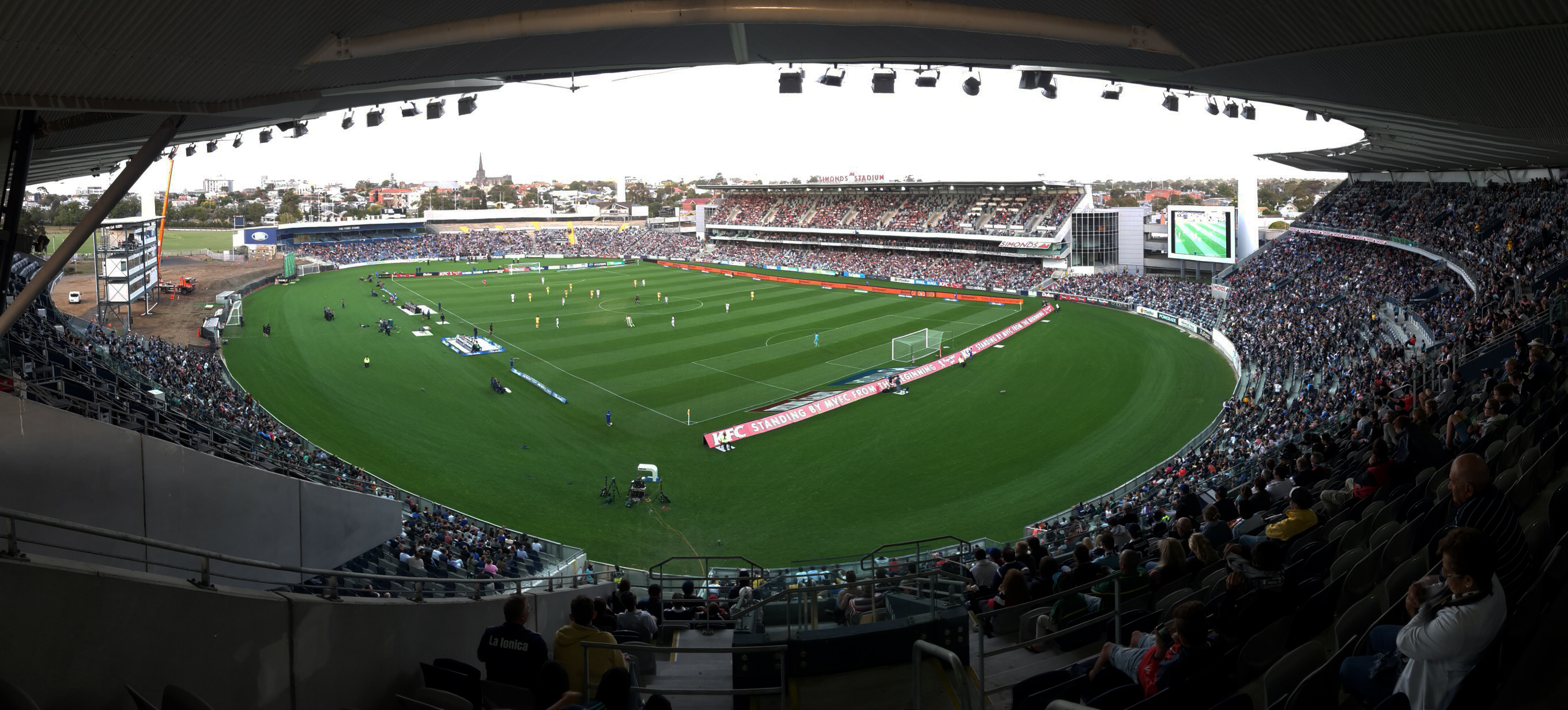
Melbourne Victory versus Central Coast Mariners, January 2016

On 22 August 2007, the club played its first competitive match at Kardinia Park, then known as GMHBA Stadium, against Newcastle Jets in the 2007 Pre-Season Cup.

On 15 February 2014, Melbourne Victory was forced to play at the Geelong-based stadium, in playing their Asian Champions League qualifying game against Muangthong United at Simonds Stadium due to AAMI Park and Marvel Stadium being unavailable.

Prior to the start of the 2014–15 season, Melbourne Victory signed a three-year deal to play one home game a year at the venue for the 2014–15, 2015–16 and 2016–17 seasons. In January 2017, the deal was extended to the conclusion of the 2018–19 season.

== Support ==
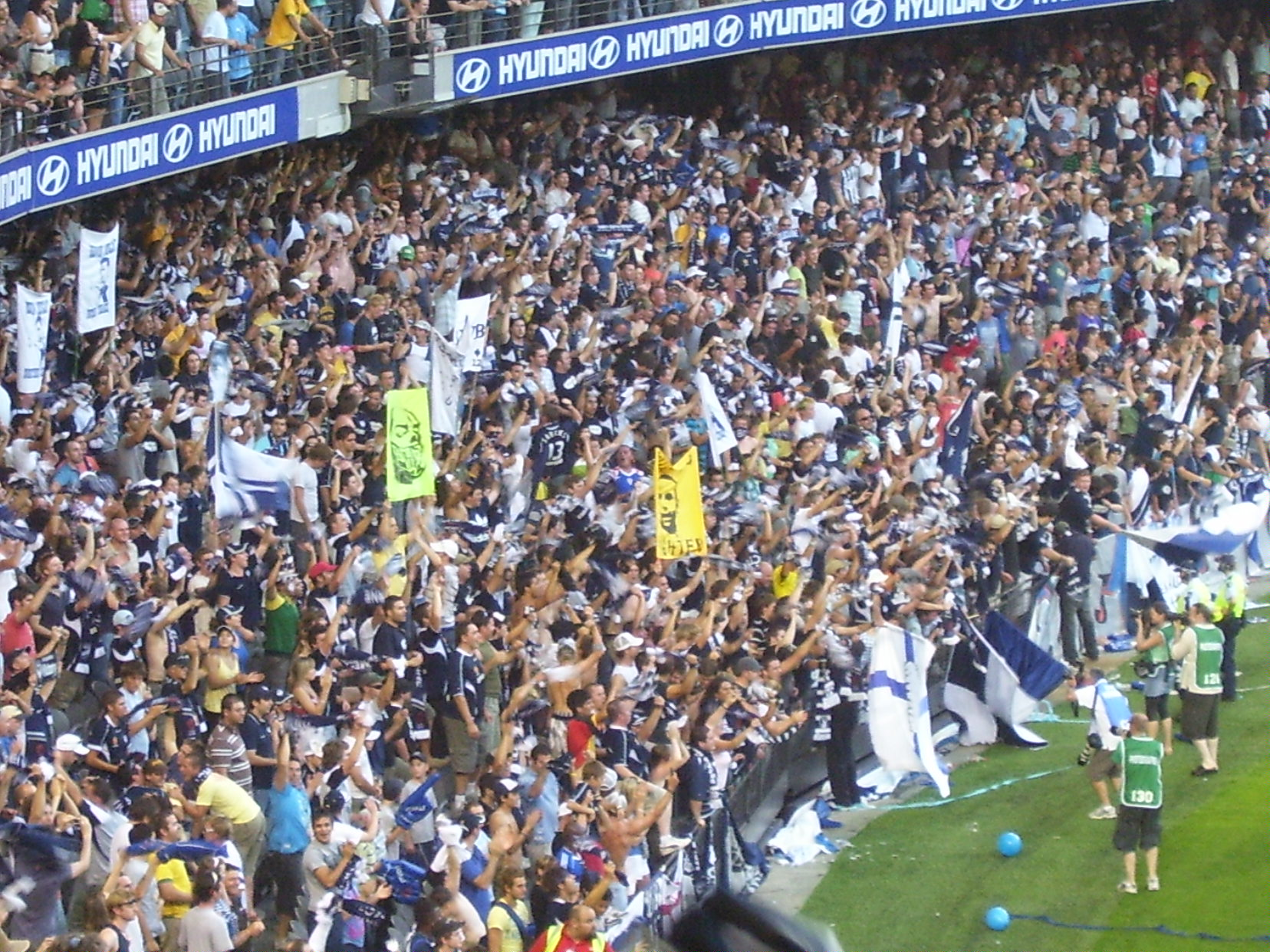
Melbourne Victory supporters at the 2007 A-League Grand Final

Season	Members	Average H&A Attendance	Total H&A Attendance	Ref.
2005–06	14,908	14,167	141,668	
2006–07	19,235	27,728	305,011	
2007–08	22,611	26,064	260,642	
2008–09	21,908	24,516	269,671	
2009–10	22,526	20,750	290,503	
2010–11	17,642	15,058	225,875	
2011–12	18,047	19,208	268,916	
2012–13	18,432	21,885	306,396	
2013–14	22,021	21,808	283,507	
2014–15	24,200	25,388	355,436	
2015–16	27,436	23,112	300,452	
2016–17	26,253	22,008	308,115	
2017–18	26,120	17,489	262,334	
2018–19	26,306	20,298	304,463	
2019–20	23,633	17,366	173,362 (Note: Reduced capacity, matches played behind closed doors not included)	
2020–21	19,100	5,823	69,873	
2021–22	Not published	9,893	138,504	
2022–23	Not published	10,124	131,608	
2023–24	Not published	12,227	158,947	
2024–25	Not published	12,778	166,109	

In 2007 Melbourne Victory had the largest supporter base in Australia. Known for their extreme passion and atmosphere, the North Terrace are the largest of the active support groups associated with Victory despite competition numbers wise in the small time Original Style Melbourne took the reins of leading the active support.

In January 2011, the Victory supporting Horda group was suspected to have stolen a banner from Melbourne Heart's Yarraside active group. In the following games, Horda banners were banned, which led to great protest from the Northern Terrace active members.

Fans anger further escalated as they were subjected to a rising police presence at games. In response, on 2 February 2011, the fans from the North Terrace organised a silent protest for the Melbourne Victory – Newcastle Jets match. They left the North Terrace empty, and had a banner saying "No fans no past no future – without us you are nothing NT United". The banner was later confiscated by the police.

In February 2011, Victoria Police said they were reluctant to cover Melbourne Victory games because of behaviour by fans that they claimed was unacceptable. Problems included violence, anti-social behaviour and the lighting of flares.

On 3 January 2014, Football Federation Australia charged both Melbourne Victory and Western Sydney Wanderers with bringing the game into disrepute following violent fan behaviour before and during their game on 28 December 2013.

Since 2015 the club has had an independent fan podcast for the club is the titled For Vucks Sake.

Post COVID-19 the club's support as well as the league's has been slowly dwindling in both the 2020–21 season and 2021–22 season but with continued support still being shown by the victory faithful, the average attendances have started to climb once again.

=== Notable supporters ===
- Ted Baillieu
- Eddie Betts
- George Calombaris
- Brad Green
- Denis Napthine
- Laura Pausini
- Ryan Papenhuyzen
- Marc Pittonet

== Rivalries ==
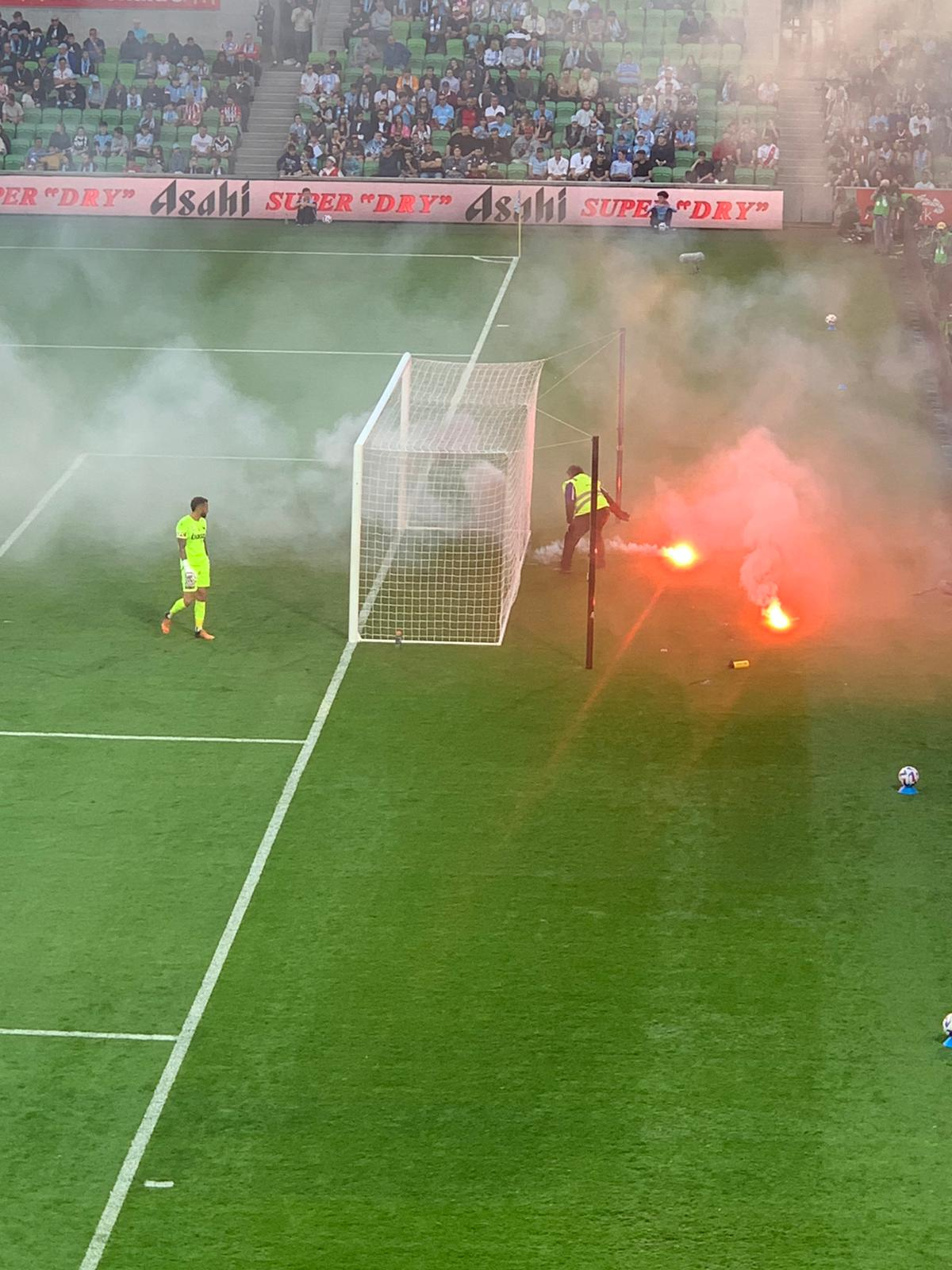
Flares thrown onto pitch during the 40th Melbourne Derby

- Melbourne City (Melbourne Derby): Melbourne Victory's local rival is Melbourne City, which entered the competition in the 2010–11 season (as Melbourne Heart, before the name change in 2014), becoming the 2nd club in Melbourne. The rivalry reached a whole new level when Victory skipper Kevin Muscat was red carded for a tackle on Heart player Adrian Zahra. Currently six former Victory players have switched to Melbourne Heart (City), with Mate Dugandžić doing the first ever direct switch from Victory to City in 2011. Anthony Lesiotis is currently the only play to have ever gone the other way (City to Victory). In the 2020–21 A-League season, City beat Victory 6–0 at Marvel Stadium, then 7–0 in the return leg at AAMI Park, with striker Jamie Maclaren scoring 5 goals in the latter, along with former Victory player Andrew Nabbout scoring the opener. The 40th Melbourne Derby on 17 December 2022 was unprecedented in its volatility, with the match marred with poor crowd behaviour, including multiple flares ignited and thrown onto the pitch by supporters of both teams. In the 20th minute of the match, Melbourne City goalkeeper Tom Glover threw back a flare sent from the crowd, sparking a pitch invasion which saw both Glover and referee Alex King assaulted by pitch invaders, and causing the match to be abandoned. In response Football Australia implemented interim sanctions closing active supporter bays for both clubs for all matches up to and including 15 January 2023. The clubs have played in one grand final against each other. Melbourne City won that in 2025 with a shoreline of 1–0.
- Sydney FC (The Big Blue): Sydney is considered Melbourne's major interstate rival, due to Melbourne and Sydney being Australia's two largest cities (see Melbourne-Sydney rivalry). Matches between the two teams are regularly the league's most spiteful encounters with narratives spanning from the inception of the A-League itself. Supporters from both sides cite each other as their most hated and competitive rivals due to the extensive history of the fixture while also acknowledging both their positions as the biggest teams in the league. The rivalry between the two teams first intensified beyond being just an interstate feud after Sydney beat Melbourne in the final match of the 2009–10 season to claim the A-League Premiership over the Victory by a single point. This was followed up with another Sydney triumph in the 2010 A-League Grand Final where the Sky Blues became the first team to win the league's Championship as the away team. However, in season 2014/15, Victory reversed these defeats, by first pipping Sydney to the A-League Premiership during the league season and weeks later beat them in the 2015 A-League Grand Final. In the 2016/17 grand final, Melbourne Victory succumbed to a 4–2 penalty shootout defeat to Sydney FC (losing to Sydney in a penalty shootout for the second time). Victory avenged that loss on 28 April 2018 in a semifinal encounter with their old rivals with a 117th minute extra time strike from Terry Antonis to win 3–2 on the night. Melbourne would meet Sydney in the following season again in the A-League semifinals where a rampant Sydney would deliver a devastating 6–1 humbling, marking the end of Victory club legend, Kevin Muscat's, managerial tenure.
- Adelaide United (The Original Derby / The Original Rivalry): Melbourne Victory also has a rivalry with Adelaide United. This rivalry stems from the other football codes, where the interstate rivalry is big between Victorians and South Australians (see South Australia-Victoria rivalry). There have also been altercations between sets of opposing fans in Melbourne and Adelaide. The rivalry has built up from previous encounters, when an incident between the then Adelaide United manager, John Kosmina, and Victory skipper Kevin Muscat took place during a sideline altercation during a match in the 2006–07 season, and when Victory striker Ney Fabiano spat in the direction of Adelaide defender Robert Cornthwaite during Round 4 in the 2008–09 season. Fabiano was banned for nine matches; but this was reduced to six after a successful appeal. Victory and Adelaide contested both the 2006–07 and 2008–09 Grand Finals, with Melbourne winning both.
- Western United (The Westgate Derby / The Battle of the Bridge): Melbourne Victory has developed a rivalry with Western United, which entered the competition in the 2019–20 season, becoming the 3rd club in Melbourne. Despite the rivalry's short existence, it has garnered a reputation for producing talking points, controversy, tension, goals and drama. In the team's first meeting, in November 2019 at Marvel Stadium, Western United won 3–2 despite going 2–0 down within the first 7 minutes. In February 2021 at Marvel Stadium, despite conceding the first goal of the match and despite being reduced to 10 men for the final half-hour of the match, Western United won 4–3, with Victor Sanchez scoring in the final minute of stoppage time. For the first 5 meetings between the two teams, Western United had 4 wins and a draw. On 28 May 2021, Melbourne Victory ended their losing run against Western United in emphatic fashion, winning 6–1 at AAMI Park. Currently six former Victory players have played for Western United (four have played for the Victory senior team, two have represented the Victory's youth or NPL teams without making an appearance for the senior team).

== Players ==
=== First team squad ===
As of 13 September 2026

Note: Flags indicate national team as defined under FIFA eligibility rules; some limited exceptions apply. Players may hold more than one non-FIFA nationality.

No.	Pos.	Nation	Player
1	GK	AUS	Jack Warshawsky
3	DF	AUS	Jason Davidson (captain)
4	DF	GER	Philipp Ziereis (vice-captain)
5	DF	AUS	Brendan Hamill
6	MF	AUS	Louis D'Arrigo
8	MF	AUS	Jordi Valadon
9	FW	AUS	Harry Sawyer
10	MF	AUS	Denis Genreau
11	FW	BRA	Santos
14	MF	AUS	Matthew Grimaldi
15	DF	WAL	Tom Lockyer (vice-captain)
16	DF	AUS	Joshua Inserra (scholarship)
18	DF	AUS	Franco Lino (on loan from Viking)

No.	Pos.	Nation	Player
19	MF	AUS	Oliver Dragicevic
21	FW	URU	Guillermo May
22	MF	AUS	Xavier Stella
23	MF	AUS	Keegan Jelacic
24	FW	AUS	Malik Olukhale
25	GK	AUS	Jack Duncan
26	MF	AUS	Jack Mihailidis
28	DF	AUS	William Kengni
29	FW	AUS	Mikey Ghossaini
30	GK	AUS	Daniel Graskoski (scholarship)
36	DF	AUS	Harry Shillington
44	FW	JPN	Charles Nduka

=== Youth ===
Players to have been featured in a first-team matchday squad in a competitive game for Melbourne Victory.

Note: Flags indicate national team as defined under FIFA eligibility rules; some limited exceptions apply. Players may hold more than one non-FIFA nationality.

No. / Pos. / Nation / Player; 38 / DF / AUS / John Radimisis	No. / Pos. / Nation / Player; 39 / FW / AUS / Alex Lee

== Corporate ==
Period	Chairman
2005–2011	(Australia) Geoff Lord
2011–2023	(Australia) Anthony Di Pietro
2023–	(Australia) John Dovaston

Melbourne Victory Football Club has been and is currently owned by unlisted public company 'Melbourne Victory Ltd', since its inception. Ownership of the holding company consists of many minor shareholders from the city of Melbourne, with shareholders consisting of Premier Fresh Australia chief executive Anthony Di Pietro, owners of Metricon and U.S. Triestina the Biasin family, and Miami based private investment firm 777 partners. In 2026, Juan Mata acquired an ownership interest after having played a season for the club. Despite the diverse shareholding by local families from Melbourne to Venture Capitalists, the club is not a "for profit" business, and as such the shareholders have never taken a dividend.

Prior to the establishment of the A-League Men, the newly established club struggled to raise the initial $5 million equity capital to join the League in its first season, resulting in Football Australia contributing approximately $500,000 to secure the club's position in the league, with the eventual intention to sell its stake. As a result, the federation took a ten per cent holding in the club in return, as well as having a representative on the Victory board. From humble beginnings, the club has become a commercial success, with the club's value increasing from $19.2m in November 2014 to $40m in 2018, with the most recent evaluation being $50m following the partial purchase of the club by 777 Partners.

== Personnel ==
=== Current technical staff ===
Position	Staff
Director of Football	(Australia) John Didulica
Head Coach	(Venezuela) Giovanni Savarese
Assistant Coach	(New Zealand) Andrew Durante
Goalkeeping Coach	(Italy) Davide Del Giovine
Strength and Conditioning Coach	(Australia) Scott Smith
Physical Performance Coach	(Australia) Massimo Murdocca
Equipment Manager	(Argentina) Guido Chayan
Football Analysis	(Australia) Michael Mantikos
Sports Science	(Australia) Wes Clarke
Doctor	(Australia) Martin Strikker
Doctor	(Australia) Krishant Naidu
Head of Physiotherapy	(Australia) Nino La Scala
Physiotherapist	(Australia) Rees Thomas
Head of Academy	(Australia) Andrew Kentzepozidis
Senior NPL Coach & Senior Academy Technical Manager	(Australia) Boris Seroshtan
Senior NPL Assistant Coach	(Australia) Matthew Sultana
Senior Academy Goalkeeper Coach	(Australia) Rob Graskoski
Senior Academy Strength and Conditioning Lead	(Australia) Athanasios Kontagiannidis
Academy Human Performance Lead	(New Zealand) Josh Butcher
Academy Operations Manager	(Australia) Jeremy Boyce
U23 Coach	(Australia) Joaquin Griffiths Moreno

=== Board members ===
- Chairman: John Dovaston
- Managing Director: Caroline Carnegie
- Director: Paul Barber
- Director: Carl Valeri
- Director: Kerry Anne Smith

== Managerial history ==
Manager	Tenure	P	W	D	L	Win %	Honours	Notes
(Scotland) (Australia) Ernie Merrick	2004–2011	170	74	41	55	43.53	2 A-League Championships; 2 A-League Premierships	
(Australia) Mehmet Durakovic	2011–2012	19	4	9	6	21.05		
(Australia) Kevin Muscat	2012	1	1	0	0	100.00		Caretaker
(Northern Ireland) Jim Magilton	2012	12	2	5	5	16.67		
(Australia) Ange Postecoglou	2012–2013	32	15	7	10	46.88		
(Australia) Kevin Muscat	2013–2019	214	105	45	64	49.07	2 A-League Championships; 1 A-League Premiership; 1 FFA Cup	Combined Win % of 49.53% including 2012 Caretaker performance
(Germany) Marco Kurz	2019–2020	15	4	3	8	26.67		
(Spain) Carlos Pérez Salvachúa	2020	12	4	2	6	33.33		Caretaker
(Scotland) Grant Brebner	2020–2021	26	5	3	18	19.23		Caretaker then Head Coach
(Scotland) Steve Kean	2021	10	2	2	6	20.00		Caretaker
(Australia) Tony Popovic	2021–2024	92	38	27	27	41.30	1 FFA Cup	
(Australia) Patrick Kisnorbo	2024	12	9	1	2	75.00		
(Australia) Arthur Diles	2024–2026	51	20	13	18	39.22		Caretaker then Head Coach

As of 27 June 2026

* Italic denotes caretaker head coach.

== Club captains ==
Dates	Name	Notes	Honours (as captain)
5 May 2005 – 16 February 2011	(Australia) Kevin Muscat	Inaugural club captain, and first captain to win a premiership and championship as both a player, captain, and manager at the same club in A-League history	2006–07 A-League Premiership; 2008–09 A-League Premiership; 2009–10 A-League Premiership Runner-up; 2006–07 A-League Championship; 2008–09 A-League Championship; 2009–10 A-League Championship Runner-up; 2008 A-League Pre-Season Challenge Cup
16 February 2011 – 17 September 2013	(Australia) Adrian Leijer		
17 September 2013 – 23 June 2015	(Australia) Mark Milligan	First club captain as Australian marquee	2014–15 A-League Premiership; 2014–15 A-League Championship; 2015 Joe Marston Medal
23 June 2015 – 22 May 2019	(Australia) Carl Valeri		2015 FFA Cup; 2016–17 A-League Premiership Runner-up; 2016–17 A-League Championship Runner-up; 2017–18 A-League Championship
1 October 2019 – 31 May 2020	(Sweden) Ola Toivonen	First foreign club captain	
31 May 2020 – 7 Nov 2021	(Australia) Leigh Broxham		
7 November 2021 – 9 July 2023	(Australia) Josh Brillante		2021 FFA Cup
11 October 2023 – 2 May 2026	(Portugal) Roderick Miranda		2024 Australia Cup Runner-up; 2023–24 A-League Championship Runner-up; 2024–25 A-League Championship Runner-up
15 October 2026 - Current	Jason Davidson		2026 Australia Cup Runner-up

== Honours ==
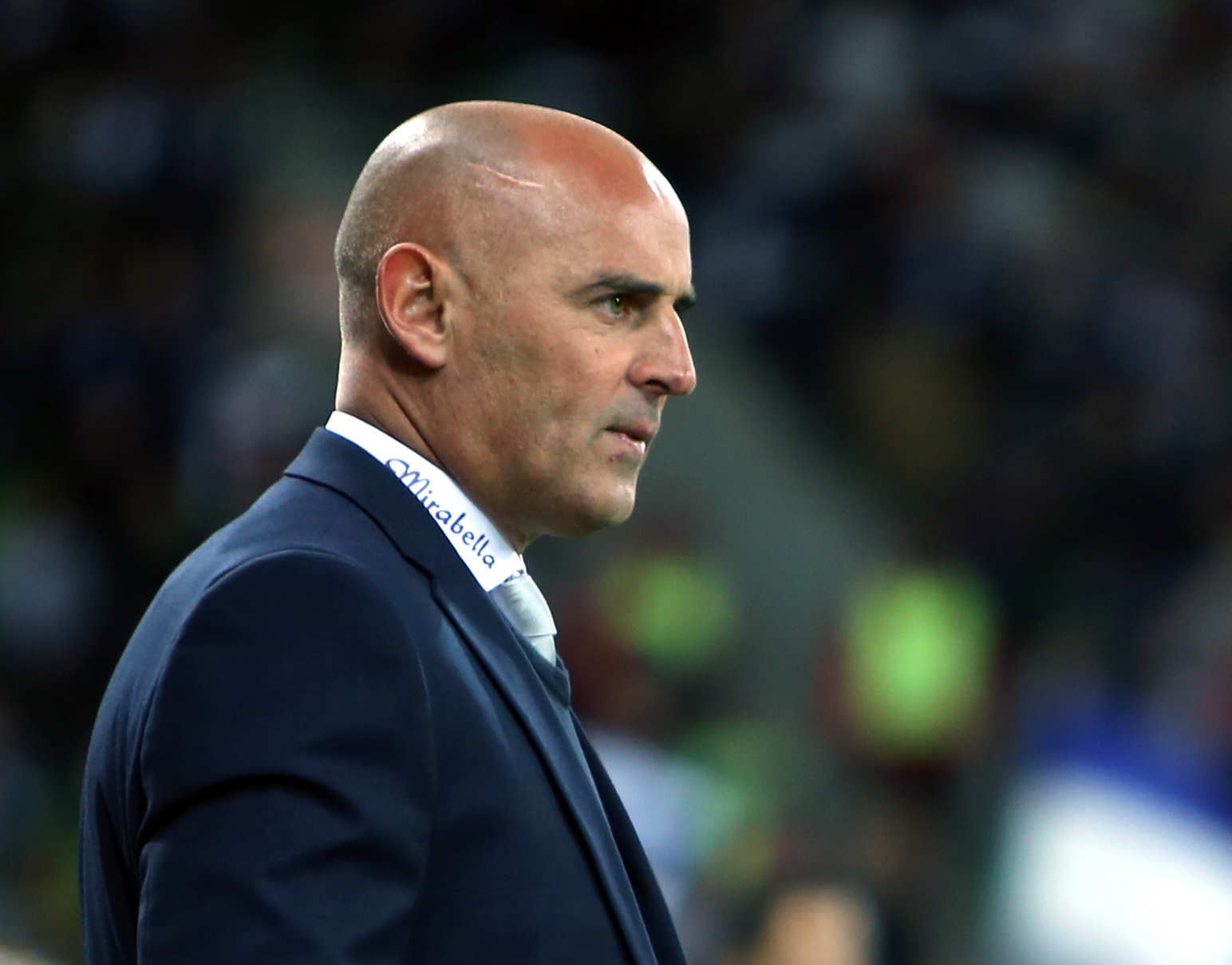
In 2015, Kevin Muscat became the first manager in the history of the A-League to win both a premiership and championship as a player and manager for the same club during his time at Melbourne Victory, and achieved this feat again in 2018.

=== Domestic ===
==== A-League ====
- A-League Men Championship
  - Winners (4): 2007, 2009, 2015, 2018
  - Runners-up (4): 2010, 2017, 2024, 2025
- A-League Men Premiership
  - Winners (3): 2006–07, 2008–09, 2014–15
  - Runners-up (3): 2009–10, 2016–17, 2021–22

==== Cups ====
- Australia Cup
  - Winners (2): 2015, 2021
  - Runners-up (2): 2024, 2026
- A-League Pre-Season Challenge Cup
  - Winners (1): 2008

=== Doubles and Trebles ===
- Doubles
  - A-League Premiership and A-League Championship (3): 2006–07, 2008–09, 2014–15

== Notable players ==
The below list of players at least two of the below criteria:

- A-League Championship
- A-League Premiership
- A-League Pre-season Challenge Cup
- Australia Cup
- Alex Tobin Medal
- Departed the club with a transfer fee
- Earned international caps whilst at the club
- Harry Kewell Medal
- Joe Marston Medal
- Johnny Warren Medal
- League Goal of the Year

- League Goalkeeper of the Year
- League Golden Boot
- League Team of the Season
- League Young Footballer of the Year
- Mark Viduka Medal
- Team of the Decade
- Victory Captain
- Victory Golden Boot
- Victory Medal
- Victory Youth Graduate
- Top ten goal scorers of the club across all competitions
- 100+ Appearances of the club across all competitions

Australia

- (Australia) Danny Allsopp
- (Australia) Nick Ansell
- (Australia) Evan Berger
- (Australia) Joshua Brillante
- (Australia) Jake Brimmer
- (Australia) Leigh Broxham
- (Australia) (North Macedonia) Billy Celeski
- (Australia) Nicholas D'Agostino
- (Australia) (Kenya) (South Sudan) Thomas Deng
- (Australia) Ben Folami
- (Australia) Matthew Kemp
- (Australia) Mitchell Langerak
- (Australia) Adrian Leijer
- (Australia) Rashid Mahazi
- (Australia) Mark Milligan
- (Australia) (England) Kevin Muscat
- (Australia) Stefan Nigro
- (Australia) Steve Pantelidis
- (Australia) Connor Pain
- (Australia) Tom Pondeljak
- (Australia) Kristian Sarkies
- (Australia) Sebastian Ryall
- (Australia) (China) (Malaysia) Ryan Teague
- (Australia) Michael Theo
- (Australia) Lawrence Thomas
- (Australia) (New Zealand) Archie Thompson
- (Australia) James Troisi
- (Australia) Carl Valeri
- (Australia) Rodrigo Vargas
- (Australia) Nick Ward

Brazil

- (Brazil) Guilherme Finkler
- (Brazil) Ney Fabiano

Costa Rica

- (Costa Rica) Carlos Hernández
- (Costa Rica) José Luis López

France

- (France) Matthieu Delpierre
- (France) Damien Da Silva

Ivory Coast

- (Ivory Coast) (Australia) Adama Traoré

Kosovo

- (Kosovo) (Albania) Besart Berisha

Malta

- (Malta) (Australia) Jake Brimmer

Netherlands

- (Netherlands) (Suriname) Leroy George

New Zealand

- (New Zealand) Kosta Barbarouses
- (New Zealand) Marco Rojas

North Macedonia

- (North Macedonia) (Australia) Daniel Georgievski

Scotland

- (Scotland) (Australia) Grant Brebner

Sweden

- (Sweden) Ola Toivonen

Tunisia

- (Tunisia) (France) Fahid Ben Khalfallah

== Team of the decade ==

2005–2014 Melbourne Victory
Football Club Team of the Decade

== Season-by-season record ==
Season	League/Division	Tms.	Pos. s.	Pos. af.	Challenge Cup	FFA Cup / Australia Cup	AFC CL
2005–06	A-League	8	7	DNQ	Semi-finals	NC	DNQ
2006–07	A-League	8	Premiers	Champions	Group stage	NC	DNQ
2007–08	A-League	8	5	DNQ	Group stage	NC	Group stage
2008–09	A-League	8	Premiers	Champions	Winners	NC	DNQ
2009–10	A-League	10	2	Runner's up	NC	NC	Group stage
2010–11	A-League	11	5	5	NC	NC	Group stage
2011–12	A-League	10	8	DNQ	NC	NC	DNQ
2012–13	A-League	10	3	3	NC	NC	DNQ
2013–14	A-League	10	4	4	NC	NC	Group stage
2014–15	A-League	10	Premiers	Champions	NC	Quarter-finals	DNQ
2015–16	A-League	10	6	6	NC	Winners	Round of 16
2016–17	A-League	10	2	Runner's up	NC	Semi-finals	DNQ
2017–18	A-League	10	4	Champions	NC	Round of 16	Group stage
2018–19	A-League	10	3	3	NC	Round of 16	Group stage
2019–20	A-League	11	10	DNQ	NC	Round of 32	Round of 16
2020–21	A-League	12	12	DNQ	NC	Cancelled due to COVID-19	DNQ
2021–22	A-League Men	12	2	SF	NC	Winners	DNPQ
2022–23	A-League Men	12	11	DNQ	NC	Round of 32	DNQ
2023–24	A-League Men	12	3	Runner's up	NC	Play-Off	DNQ
2024–25	A-League Men	13	5	Runner's up	NC	Runner's up	DNQ
2025–26	A-League Men	12	4	EF	NC	Round of 32	DNQ

Chart of yearly table positions for Melbourne Victory in A-League Men

Key

- DNQ = Did not qualify
- DNPQ = Did not pre-qualify
- NC = Tournament not contested
- Pos. af. = Position in league during finals series
- Pos. s. = Position in league during regular season
- TBD = Tournament in progress, outcome to be determined
- Tms. = Number of teams

== Continental record ==
Season	Competition	Round	Club	Home	Away	Aggregate
2005	OFC Champions League	OFC Champions League Qualification	(Australia) Adelaide United	0–0 (a.e.t.) (1–4 p)		
2008	AFC Champions League	Group G	(South Korea) Jeonnam Dragons	2–0	1–1	2nd out of 4
2008	AFC Champions League	Group G	(Thailand) Chonburi	3–1	1–3	2nd out of 4
2008	AFC Champions League	Group G	(Japan) Gamba Osaka	3–4	0–2	2nd out of 4
2010	AFC Champions League	Group E	(China) Beijing Guoan	0–0	0–1	4th out of 4
2010	AFC Champions League	Group E	(South Korea) Seongnam Ilhwa Chunma	0–2	2–3	4th out of 4
2010	AFC Champions League	Group E	(Japan) Kawasaki Frontale	1–0	0–4	4th out of 4
2011	AFC Champions League	Group E	(Japan) Gamba Osaka	1–1	1–5	4th out of 4
2011	AFC Champions League	Group E	(South Korea) Jeju United	1–2	1–1	4th out of 4
2011	AFC Champions League	Group E	(China) Tianjin Teda	2–1	1–1	4th out of 4
2014	AFC Champions League	Play-off round	(Thailand) Muangthong United	2–1		
2014	AFC Champions League	Group G	(China) Guangzhou Evergrande	2–0	2–4	3rd out of 4
2014	AFC Champions League	Group G	(South Korea) Jeonbuk Hyundai Motors	2–2	0–0	3rd out of 4
2014	AFC Champions League	Group G	(Japan) Yokohama F. Marinos	1–0	2–3	3rd out of 4
2016	AFC Champions League	Group G	(China) Shanghai SIPG	2–1	1–3	2nd out of 4
2016	AFC Champions League	Group G	(Japan) Gamba Osaka	2–1	1–1	2nd out of 4
2016	AFC Champions League	Group G	(South Korea) Suwon Samsung Bluewings	0–0	1–1	2nd out of 4
2016	AFC Champions League	Round of 16	(South Korea) Jeonbuk Hyundai Motors	1–1	1–2	2–3
2018	AFC Champions League	Group F	(South Korea) Ulsan Hyundai	3–3	2–6	3rd out of 4
2018	AFC Champions League	Group F	(China) Shanghai SIPG	2–1	1–4	3rd out of 4
2018	AFC Champions League	Group F	(Japan) Kawasaki Frontale	1–0	2–2	3rd out of 4
2019	AFC Champions League	Group F	(South Korea) Daegu FC	1–3	0–4	4th out of 4
2019	AFC Champions League	Group F	(Japan) Sanfrecce Hiroshima	1–3	1–2	4th out of 4
2019	AFC Champions League	Group F	(China) Guangzhou Evergrande	1–1	0–4	4th out of 4
2020	AFC Champions League	Preliminary round 2	(Indonesia) Bali United	5–0		
2020	AFC Champions League	Play-off round	(Japan) Kashima Antlers	1–0		
2020	AFC Champions League	Group E	(Thailand) Chiangrai United	1–0	2–2	2nd out of 4
2020	AFC Champions League	Group E	(South Korea) FC Seoul	2–1	0–1	2nd out of 4
2020	AFC Champions League	Group E	(China) Beijing FC	0–2	1–3	2nd out of 4
2020	AFC Champions League	Round of 16	(South Korea) Ulsan Hyundai	0–3		
2022	AFC Champions League	Play-off round	(Japan) Vissel Kobe	3–4 (a.e.t.)		
2026–27	AFC Champions League Two	Group E	(Vietnam) Thể Công–Viettel		1–1	
2026–27	AFC Champions League Two	Group E	(South Korea) FC Seoul	3–0		
2026–27	AFC Champions League Two	Group E	(Indonesia) Persib Bandung	1–2	0–2	

== See also ==
- Melbourne Victory FC (W-League)
- Melbourne Victory FC Youth
