= Frank Costa =

Australian businessman and philanthropist (1938–2021)

Frank Costa AO
- Born: Francis Aloysius Costa; 3 February 1938; Geelong, Victoria, Australia
- Died: 2 May 2021 (aged 83); Geelong, Victoria, Australia
- Occupations: Entrepreneur and philanthropist
- Known for: Costa Group; President of Geelong Football Club
- Spouse: Shriley Costa (m. 1960)
- Children: 8 daughters
- Parents: Tony Costa (father); Mary Piccone (mother)
- Awards: Officer of the Order of Australia (AO); Order of Australia Medal (OAM); Australian Sports Medal (2001); Centenary Medal (2001)

Frank Aloysius Costa AO (3 February 1938 – 2 May 2021) was an Australian businessman. Costa had been a prominent figure in the Geelong region for more than four decades after inheriting Costa Group, the family's produce business, in the late 1950s. Initially privately held, the Costa Group became the largest service wholesaler of fruit and vegetables in Australia with operations in five states. In 2015 the company was floated on the Australian Securities Exchange as Costa Group Holdings Limited.

In 1998, Frank Costa became president of the Geelong Football Club.

== Career ==
Costa was the eldest of five sons born to Sicilian immigrants who moved to Australia in the 1880s. His great-uncle established the Geelong Covent Garden in 1888 – a produce grocery which he ran until the 1920s, at which time he turned it over to Costa's father.

When Costa was 21, he (along with his brother Adrian) convinced his father to sell the business to them. Costa successfully grew the business with help from his brother, as they made forays into wholesaling. Although Adrian died in 1972 as a result of an automobile accident, and despite a few business blunders– including the failed development of a state-of-the-art warehouse in Geelong– the remaining Costa brothers were able to keep the business afloat. By the 1980s, the company had an annual turnover of around A$100 million. In the early 1990s, Costa's wholesale fruit operation was compelled to co-operate with the Melbourne underworld. In 2004, Costa appointed Simon Costa, his nephew, as CEO of the Costa Group of Companies, enabling Costa to concentrate on philanthropic activities and the Presidency of the Geelong Football Club. At the time, the company had 800 employees, and a turnover in excess of A$800 million. The Costa Group of Companies was listed on the Australian Stock Exchange in July 2015. In 2019 Costa stepped down from the board of the publicly listed Costa Group.

=== Political scandals ===
His push for the recycling/irrigation plant is one of many events that has caused some to raise conflict of interest concerns, as his company may have been in a position to obtain a substantial benefit from the project. In addition to being a Committee for Geelong board member and being president of the Geelong Football Club, Costa was involved in some of the most prominent development projects being touted for the region. These include the development in North Geelong near the Ford site and at Point Richards near Portarlington. In 2006 it was revealed that Costa was part of a group of powerful business leaders who had made political campaign donations that were not disclosed by the candidates.

== Personal life ==
Costa married Shirley in 1960, and they had eight daughters. He died from cancer on 2 May 2021, aged 83.

Costa is the subject of a 2006 biography, with a foreword by eminent historian Geoffrey Blainey, and contains references to Geelong identities, the Geelong Football Club, and Italian immigrants in Geelong.

=== Honours ===
In 1997, Costa was awarded the Medal of the Order of Australia for service to youth and to the community of Geelong. In 2015, Costa was appointed an Officer of the Order of Australia for distinguished service to the community of Geelong through ongoing roles and contributions to a range of sports, business, religious, medical, educational and social welfare organisations. In 2001 Costa was also awarded the Centenary Medal for service to the Barwon community and, in the same year, the Australian Sports Medal for services to Australian football.

=== Wealth rankings ===
Year	Financial Review Rich List		Forbes Australia's 50 Richest	
Year	Rank	Net worth (A$)	Rank	Net worth (US$)
2017		$538 million ▲		
2018	127 ▲	$655 million ▲		
2019	118 ▲	$802 million ▲		
2020	132 ▼	$770 million ▼		

Legend
Icon	Description
Steady	Has not changed from the previous year
▲	Has increased from the previous year
▼	Has decreased from the previous year

Following Costa's death in 2021, his net worth was generally reported in the name of his surviving wife, Shirley, and family.

=== Philanthropy ===
According to a 2004 poll, Costa held first place on the list of the region's "Movers and Shakers". The same year saw Costa publicly urge the authorities to keep its promise of developing a recycling and irrigation facility in the Werribee region.

Costa was Patron of the Geelong Volunteer Resource Centre and the Geelong Volunteering Network, and academy ambassador for Surf Coast FC.

Sporting positions
Preceded by Ron Hovey	Geelong Football Club president 1998–2011	Succeeded by Colin Carter
