= Australian Fresh Produce Alliance =

Trade organisation

- Founded: 14 March 2019; 7 years ago
- Headquarters: Melbourne, Victoria, Australia
- Location: Australia
- Members: 11 companies
- Website: freshproduce.org.au

The Australian Fresh Produce Alliance (AFPA) is a national organisation representing major growers and suppliers in the industry of fresh fruit and vegetables in Australia. Founded in 2019, the AFPA was established to provide a unified voice on issues affecting the production, supply, and sustainability of fresh produce for both domestic and export markets.

== History ==
=== Formation ===
AFPA was launched in March 2019 by fourteen 'member companies', consisting of 2PH Farms, Costa Group, Driscoll's, Freshmax, Fresh Produce Group, Fresh Select, Mackays, Montague, One Harvest, Perfection Fresh, Piñata Farms, Premier Fresh Australia (then 'LaManna Premier Group'), Rugby Farms, and Mitolo Group.

=== List of presidents ===
Name	Term	Member Company
Harry Debney	2019	Costa Group
Michael Simonetta	2020	Perfection Fresh
Anthony Di Pietro	2021	Premier Fresh Australia
John Said	2022	Fresh Select
Scott Montague	2023	MD Montague
Gavin Scurr	2024	Piñata Farms
Richard Clayton	2025	Australian Produce Partners
