= A-League Men Goal of the Year =

Australian soccer award

The A-League Men Goal of the Season is an annual soccer award for the player deemed to have scored the best goal in the preceding A-League Men season.

The award was first given following the 2006–07 season and has been awarded under the Dolan Warren Awards since. The first recipient of the award was Newcastle Jets' Nick Carle for his goal at home against Adelaide United. The last recipient of the award was Melbourne Victory's Bruno Fornaroli for his goal away at Central Coast Mariners.

== Winners ==
Key
**Bold**	Player still active in the A-League Men
†	Indicates player who also won the A-League Men Golden Boot award in the same season
§	Denotes the club were A-League Men champions in the same season
Italics	Home team

Season	Player	Nationality	Team	Score (Note: The score at the time of the goal. Player's team's score listed first.)	Opponent	Date	Ref.
2006–07	Nick Carle	Australia	Newcastle Jets	**2**–1	Adelaide United	27 October 2006	
2007–08	Brendon Santalab	Australia	Sydney FC	**1**–1	Adelaide United	28 December 2007	
2008–09	Shane Smeltz †	New Zealand	Wellington Phoenix	**2**–1	Melbourne Victory	28 November 2008	
2009–10	Archie Thompson	Australia	Melbourne Victory	**4**–0	Gold Coast United	28 November 2009	
2010–11	Erik Paartalu	Australia	Brisbane Roar ^{§}	**2**–0	Gold Coast United	12 February 2011	
2011–12	Carlos Hernández	Costa Rica	Melbourne Victory	**1**–1	Central Coast Mariners	10 February 2012	
2012–13	Marcos Flores	Argentina	Melbourne Victory	**2**–0	Wellington Phoenix	5 November 2012	
2013–14	Orlando Engelaar	Netherlands	Melbourne Heart	**1**–0	Central Coast Mariners	23 March 2014	
2014–15	Tarek Elrich	Australia	Adelaide United	**3**–0	Melbourne City	25 April 2015	
2015–16	Roy O'Donovan	Ireland	Central Coast Mariners	**2**–4	Adelaide United	27 March 2016	
2016–17	Tim Cahill	Australia	Melbourne City	**1**–0	Melbourne Victory	15 October 2016	
2017–18	**Andrew Nabbout**	Australia	Newcastle Jets	**2**–2	Western Sydney Wanderers	16 February 2018	
2018–19	Éric Bauthéac	France	Brisbane Roar	**1**–0	Central Coast Mariners	22 February 2019	
2019–20	Nikolai Topor-Stanley	Australia	Newcastle Jets	**1**–0	Perth Glory	29 February 2020	
2020–21	Andy Keogh	Ireland	Perth Glory	**2**–0	Western Sydney Wanderers	16 May 2021	
2021–22	**Ben Garuccio**	Australia	Western United ^{§}	**3**–1	Western Sydney Wanderers	20 February 2022	
2022–23	Giordano Colli	Australia	Perth Glory	**1**–2	Adelaide United	30 October 2022	
2023–24	**Bruno Fornaroli**	Australia	Melbourne Victory	**1**–1	Central Coast Mariners	3 December 2023	
2024–25	**Jordan Lauton**	Australia	Western United	**3**–2	Perth Glory	3 January 2025	
2025–26	Youstin Salas	Costa Rica	Brisbane Roar	**2**–3	Melbourne City	18 April 2026	

== Awards won by nationality ==
Country	Players	Total
Australia	12	12
Costa Rica	2	2
Ireland	2	2
Argentina	1	1
France	1	1
Netherlands	1	1

== Awards won by club ==
Club	Players	Total
Melbourne Victory	4	4
Brisbane Roar	3	3
Newcastle Jets	3	3
Melbourne Heart/City	2	2
Perth Glory	2	2
Western United	2	2
Adelaide United	1	1
Central Coast Mariners	1	1
Sydney FC	1	1
Wellington Phoenix	1	1

== See also ==
- A-League Men Goal of the Month
- A-League Men Coach of the Year
- A-League Men Young Footballer of the Year
- A-League Men Goalkeeper of the Year
- Johnny Warren Medal
- Joe Marston Medal
