= Peter McCormack (footballer) =

Australian rules footballer

Personal information
- Born: 1 August 1956 (age 70)
- Original team: Assumption College
- Height: 188 cm (6 ft 2 in)
- Weight: 86 kg (190 lb)

Playing career^{1}
Years	Club	Games (Goals)
1976–1985	Collingwood	160 (21)
1986	Richmond	4 (0)
1986	Fitzroy	1 (0)
Total		165 (21)
- ^{1} Playing statistics correct to the end of 1986.

Peter McCormack (born 1 August 1956) is a former Australian rules footballer who played for Collingwood in the VFL during the late 1970s and 1980s before finishing his career with stints at Richmond and Fitzroy.

Collingwood recruited McCormack from Assumption College where he was a successful forward. He thus began at Collingwood in the full-forward position but struggled and in his second season and required a knee reconstruction. When he returned in 1978 it was at fullback and he soon made that position his own, occupying it in the Grand Finals of 1979, 1980 and 1981, all of which the Magpies lost.

In 1986 McCormack transferred to Richmond, but ended up finishing the season at Fitzroy.
