= Premier Fresh Australia =

Australian fruits-and-vegetables company

- Type: Privately Held Company
- Industry: Agribusiness
- Headquarters: Melbourne, Victoria, Australia
- Area served: Global
- Key people: Kerry Smith (Chairperson); Anthony Di Pietro (CEO); Dean Gall (CCO); Mark Lo Giudice (Director); [excessive citations]
- Products: Fruits; Vegetables
- Website: premierfresh.com.au

Premier Fresh Australia is an Australian fresh fruit and vegetable supply chain company with farming roots dating back to 1946. "Premier" is today one of Australia's leading producers and distributors of produce.

In 2019, Premier became a founding member of the Australian Fresh Produce Alliance, and was awarded Woolworths Group Fruit & Vegetable, and Overall Trade Partner (supplier) of the year for 2025.

== Operations ==
Premier Fresh grows and markets produce within Australia, and also exports worldwide, with divisions including:

- Australian Banana Company: Responsible for banana farming and logistics nationwide
- Darwin Fruit Farms: Responsible for banana farming and logistics nationwide
- Innisfail Banana Farming Company: Responsible for banana farming and logistics nationwide
- Lancaster Farms: Responsible for tomato, pumpkin and persimmon farming and logistics nationwide
- Premier Trading: Responsible for the public marketing of asparagus, apricots, avocados, bananas, beans, capsicums, cherries, chillis, cucumbers, eggplant, grapefruit, grapes, honeydews, kiwifruit, lemons, limes, lychees, mangoes, mandarins, nectarines, oranges, papaya, passionfruit, pawpaw, peaches, pineapples, plums, pumpkins, rockmelons, squash, tangelo, tomatoes, watermelon, zucchini
- Premier Farms International: Exports and markets multiple varieties of avocados, grapes, grapefruit, lemons, nectarines, oranges, peaches, pears
- Sellars Bananas: Responsible for banana farming and logistics nationwide

== See also ==
- Gardening in Australia
