= Anthony Di Pietro =

Australian businessman and soccer promoter

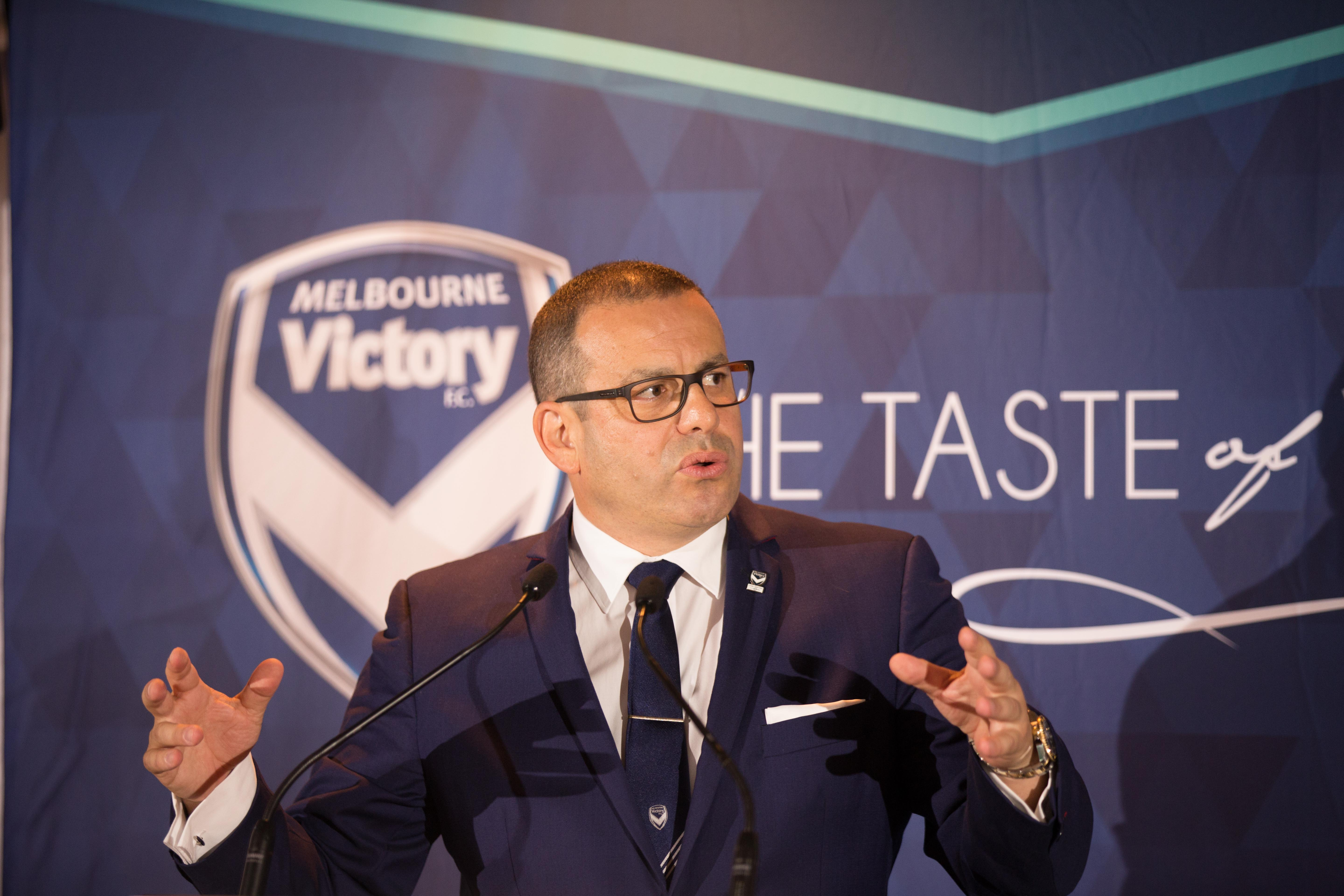
- Di Pietro addresses the audience at a Melbourne Victory Function
- Born: 15 February 1969 (age 57); Frankston, Victoria, Australia
- Education: University of Melbourne
- Occupations: Businessman; CEO and Director of Premier Fresh Australia (2003–); Chairman of Melbourne Victory Football Club (2011–2023); Director of Australian Fresh Produce Alliance (2019–); Vice President of Essendon Football Club (2026–)
- Known for: Chairman of Melbourne Victory FC

Anthony Di Pietro (born 15 February 1969) is an Australian businessman from Melbourne, who is most known for his longest standing chairmanship of Melbourne Victory Football Club. Alongside the Victory, Di Pietro is also the Vice President of the Essendon Football Club, the Chief Executive Officer of industry leading fruit & vegetable producers and marketers, Premier Fresh Australia, and a board member of produce industry body, the Australian Fresh Produce Alliance.

== Early life and education ==
Di Pietro is a University of Melbourne alumni holding a Bachelor of Commerce degree and has delivered the occasional address to the graduating students in the university's Business and Economics faculty. He attended John Paul College for high school.

== Agribusiness ==
Di Pietro is Group CEO of Premier Fresh Australia.

The company's farming and marketing enterprises cover all major Australian markets. It has farming operations in Queensland, the Northern Territory, South Australia, and Goulburn Valley Victoria.

Di Pietro voiced his advocacy for an 'Australian-led Asian food boom' and was a key participant in the Victorian Government's 2013 Food Trade initiatives into Asia.

In March 2019, Di Pietro was a founding director of the Australian Fresh Produce Alliance and is still active as of October 2025. For the 2021 calendar year, Di Pietro served as Chair.

== Melbourne Victory FC ==
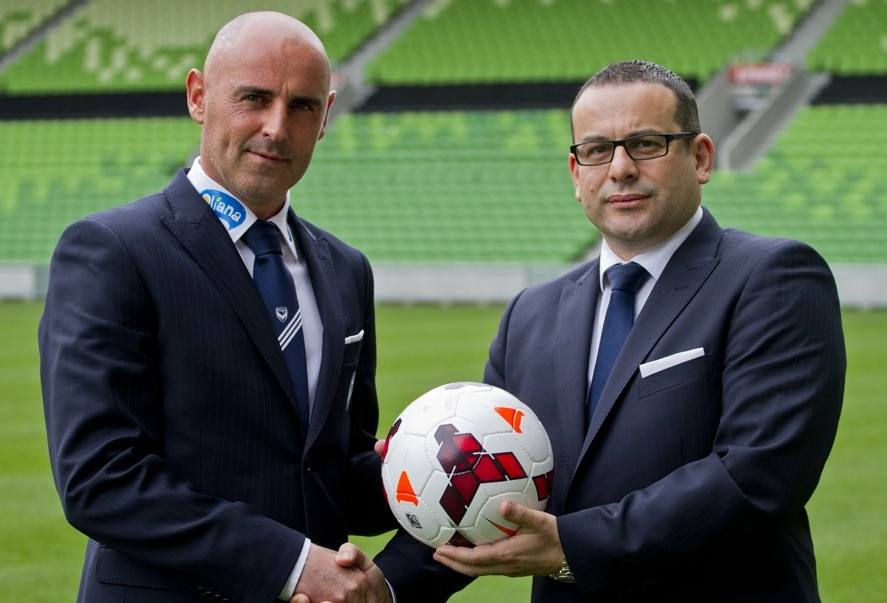
Di Pietro alongside Melbourne Victory coach Kevin Muscat at Melbourne Rectangular Stadium in October 2013

Di Pietro was appointed to the Board of Melbourne Victory FC in 2006 during its formative years and became chairman in January 2011, until June 2023.

Di Pietro oversaw a number of key achievements, including the men's history making trophy treble in 2015 (Championship, Premiership and FFA Cup) and the 2017–18 Championship, as well as winning the Australia Cup titles in 2015 and 2021. Di Pietro also oversaw Victory’s women’s team win the Premiership in 2018–19 and three Championships including back to back titles in 2020–21 and 2021–22, making Melbourne Victory FC one of the most successful clubs in A-Leagues history.

Di Pietro oversaw the visit of European heavyweights Liverpool in July 2013 attracting a record crowd for a football (soccer) match of 95,446 people at the Melbourne Cricket Ground, as well as hosting Juventus in 2016 and Manchester United in 2022.

== Essendon FC ==
On 30 October 2025, Di Pietro was announced as a director of the Essendon Football Club. Six months after joining the board, Di Pietro was announced as Vice President on 11 March 2026.
