= Costa Group =

Australian horticultural company

Costa Group Holdings Limited
- Industry: Agribusiness
- Headquarters: Ravenhall, Victoria, Australia
- Area served: Global
- Key people: Neil Chatfield Chairman; Marc Werner CEO
- Products: Fruit; Vegetables; Other food products
- Revenue: AUD 1,328.7 million (FY2022)
- Net income: AUD 33.6 million (FY2022)
- Parent: Paine Schwartz
- Website: costagroup.com.au

Costa Group is Australia's largest horticultural company and a major supplier of produce to food retailers. The company had an IPO in 2015 and was officially listed on the Australian Securities Exchange.

== Operations ==
Costa Group grows most of its produce at its own farms and greenhouses. Divisions include:

- Produce: berries, mushrooms, tomatoes, citrus fruit, bananas, avocados and table grapes
- International: grows proprietary varieties of blueberries and other berries for international markets
- Costa Farms and Logistics: Responsible for logistics and wholesaling, as well as banana farming and marketing

== History ==
Costa has undergone significant changes and growth since its origins in a family-owned fruit shop that was founded in Geelong in 1888. Today, the Costa Group stands as Australia's largest horticultural company with diversified operations across the supply chain from farming and packing to marketing and distribution.

Costa entered into a strategic partnership with Paine + Partners in 2011 to support further growth and development of the company. The company floated on the Australian Securities Exchange in July 2015.

Since 2011, Costa has been undertaking a strategic transformation program focused on increasing its scale and vertical integration within its portfolio and reinvesting in the business to refresh core assets and fund growth. Expansion initiatives have included the development of the berry and sweet snacking tomato categories organically, the acquisition of Adelaide Mushrooms (a mushroom producer with operations in South Australia and Tasmania) and additions to its citrus footprint through the entry into long-term leases of ex-Timbercorp orchards in 2011.

The formation of the African Blue JV in Morocco in 2007 and the formation of a farming joint venture in Southern China have enabled Costa to grow its international interests. Costa now grows approximately 368 ha of blueberries in Morocco and 381 ha of blueberries, raspberries and other berries in Southern China.

As part of its strategic transformation program, Costa has exited categories such as leafy vegetables, potatoes and stone fruit, as well as downsized non-core operations including table grapes, bananas and logistics.

In September 2023, the Board of Costa agreed to a takeover offer from a private equity consortium led by Paine Schwartz Partners, Driscoll’s Inc and the British Columbian Investment Management Corp at AUD 3.20 per share, valuing the company at approximately AUD 1.5 billion. The takeover was completed in February 2024.

In March 2025, Costa Group commenced blueberry production in Paksong, Laos on the Bolaven Plateau. They have plans to expand to 200 hectares by 2028.

== See also ==
- Gardening in Australia
