= 2024 National Premier Leagues Victoria Women =

Seventh edition of the top Victorian women's football (soccer) league

National Premier Leagues Victoria Women
- Season: 2024
- Dates: 15 March 2024 – 7 September 2024
- Champions: Heidelberg United
- Premiers: Bulleen Lions
- Matches played: 132
- Goals scored: 516 (3.91 per match)
- Top goalscorer: Maja Markovski (20)
- Biggest home win: Bulleen Lions 8–0 Calder United (24 August 2024)
- Biggest away win: Calder United 0–8 Preston Lions (5 May 2024)
- Highest scoring: Boroondara-Carey Eagles 4–4 Heidelberg United (20 April 2024); Calder United 0–8 Preston Lions (5 May 2024); Bulleen Lions 6-2 Boroondara-Carey Eagles (22 June 2024); Bentleigh Greens 1-7 Preston Lions (13 July 2024); Preston Lions 7-1 Alamein (26 July 2024); Heidelberg United 6-2 Brunswick Juventus (10 August 2024); Bulleen Lions 8–0 Calder United (24 August 2024)
- Longest winning run: 10 matches Bulleen Lions
- Longest unbeaten run: 11 matches South Melbourne
- Longest winless run: 12 matches Brunswick Juventus
- Longest losing run: 10 matches Calder United
- All statistics correct as of 7 September 2024. (Note: Longest runs only include regular season results)

The 2024 National Premier Leagues Victoria Women, known commonly as the NPL Victoria Women's or NPLV Women's, was the seventh season of the National Premier Leagues Victoria Women under the NPL format, and the 24th season of top-flight Victorian Women's football overall.

== Teams ==
Twelve teams are competing in the league – the top ten teams from the previous season and the two teams promoted from the VPL Women's. The promoted teams were Essendon Royals and Brunswick Juventus. They replaced Southern United who were relegated to the VPL Women's after just one season.

Bayside United would compete as Bentleigh Greens from the 2024 season following the merger between the two clubs.

== Stadiums and locations ==
Locations of 2024 NPL VIC Women clubs.

Team	Location	Stadium
Alamein	Glen Iris	Dorothy Laver West Reserve
Bentleigh Greens	Cheltenham	Kingston Heath Soccer Complex
Boroondara-Carey Eagles	Bulleen	David Barro Stadium
Box Hill United	Box Hill	Wembley Park
Brunswick Juventus	Fawkner	CB Smith Reserve
Bulleen Lions	Bulleen	David Barro Stadium
Calder United	Keilor Park	Keilor Park Recreation Reserve
Essendon Royals	Essendon	Cross Keys Reserve
FV Emerging	Bundoora	Home of the Matildas
Heidelberg United	Heidelberg West	Olympic Park
Preston Lions FC	Reservoir	B.T. Connor Reserve
South Melbourne	Albert Park	Lakeside Stadium

== Regular season ==
=== League table ===
Pos	Team	Pld	W	D	L	GF	GA	GD	Pts	Qualification or relegation
1	Bulleen Lions	22	17	1	4	67	22	+45	52	Qualification for finals series
2	Preston Lions FC	22	14	3	5	67	34	+33	45	Qualification for finals series
3	Essendon Royals	22	14	3	5	40	32	+8	45	Qualification for finals series
4	Heidelberg United (C)	22	13	3	6	52	36	+16	42	Qualification for finals series
5	South Melbourne	22	10	5	7	48	35	+13	35	
6	Boroondara-Carey Eagles	22	10	3	9	44	43	+1	33	
7	Box Hill United	22	9	3	10	40	34	+6	30	
8	Alamein	22	9	3	10	42	54	−12	30	
9	FV Emerging	22	7	5	10	37	46	−9	26	
10	Benleigh Greens	22	4	2	16	21	57	−36	14	
11	Brunswick Juventus (R)	22	3	4	15	30	52	−22	13	Relegation to VPL Women's
12	Calder United (R)	22	3	3	16	28	71	−43	12	Relegation to VPL Women's

Updated to match(es) played on 24 August 2024. Source: NPL VIC Women
Rules for classification: 1) Points; 2) Goal difference; 3) Goals scored
(C) Champions; (R) Relegated

=== Results ===
Home \ Away	ALA	BEN	BOR	BOX	BRU	BUL	CAL	ESS	FVE	HEI	PRE	SOM
Alamein	—	1–1	4–3	0–4	2–1	1–4	3–2	2–1	1–0	2–3	1–3	1–5
Bentleigh Greens	1–6	—	2–3	1–0	1–0	1–4	1–1	0–1	3–0	2–1	1–7	1–4
Boroondara-Carey Eagles	1–0	3–0	—	1–1	4–1	2–4	2–1	5–0	1–0	4–4	2–3	1–0
Box Hill United	2–1	2–1	2–1	—	1–2	0–3	2–1	1–2	6–0	3–0	0–1	3–3
Brunswick Juventus	2–3	2–1	0–1	3–4	—	0–3	5–0	2–3	2–2	0–4	2–4	2–3
Bulleen Lions	4–3	7–0	6–2	3–2	1–0	—	8–0	1–2	2–0	3–1	1–2	3–0
Calder United	2–3	2–1	2–1	1–1	2–2	0–3	—	4–2	1–2	1–3	0–8	0–4
Essendon Royals	2–2	3–1	1–2	2–1	1–0	1–0	5–2	—	1–0	2–0	2–1	1–1
FV Emerging	2–3	2–1	2–2	3–1	1–1	1–3	4–2	3–1	—	1–3	4–2	3–2
Heidelberg United	2–0	1–0	5–0	2–1	6–2	3–1	3–2	1–3	2–2	—	2–2	1–2
Preston Lions FC	7–1	3–0	4–3	2–0	4–0	0–2	5–1	2–2	2–2	2–3	—	2–1
South Melbourne	2–2	4–1	1–0	1–3	1–1	1–1	3–1	1–2	4–3	1–2	4–1	—

Updated to match(es) played on 18 August 2023. Source: NPL VIC Women
Legend: Blue = home team win; Yellow = draw; Red = away team win.

== Finals series ==
The finals series ran over two weeks, and involved the top four teams from the regular season. In the first week of fixtures, the four teams would play semi-finals with first playing fourth and second playing third. The two winners of those matches would meet in the Grand Final.

=== Bracket ===
Semi-finals
1	Bulleen Lions	2
4	Heidelberg United	4
2	Preston Lions	1
3	Essendon Royals	0

Grand Final
2	Preston Lions	2
4	Heidelberg United	3

=== Semi-finals ===
30 August 2024
19:30 AEST (UTC+10:00)

Preston Lions	1-0	Essendon Royals
Johnson 45+2'	Report

B.T. Connor Reserve, Reservoir
Referee: Jock Quartermain

31 August 2024
15:00 AEST (UTC+10:00)

Bulleen Lions	2-4	Heidelberg United
Lockhart 81' (o.g.); Salleh 90+1'	Report	Galea 25', 76'; O'Donoghue 33'; Hudson 73' (o.g.)

David Barro Stadium, Bulleen
Referee: Angelique Mangion

=== Grand Final ===
7 September 2024
15:30 AEST (UTC+10:00)

Preston Lions	2-3	Heidelberg United
Phonsongkham 28'; Johnson 36'	Report	Jancevski 11' (pen.); Lockhart 88'; Ambo 90+5'

Home of the Matildas, Bundoora
Referee: Courtney Van Diesen

== Regular season statistics ==
=== Top scorers ===
Rank	Player	Club	Goals
1	(Australia) Maja Markovski	Bulleen Lions	20
2	(United States) Haley Johnson	Preston Lions	19
3	(United States) Gabrielle Hollar	Boroondara-Carey Eagles	18
3	(Australia) Rebecca Saber	Alamein	18
5	(Australia) Audrey Oastler	Essendon Royals	13
5	(New Zealand) Nicole Cooper	Brunswick Juventus	13
7	(Australia) Ellie La Monte	Preston Lions	12
8	(Australia) Keely Lockhart	Heidelberg United	11
8	(Australia) Alana Jancevski	Heidelberg United	11
10	(Japan) Mebae Tanaka	Preston Lions	10
10	(Australia) Danielle Wise	South Melbourne	10
10	(Australia) Olivia Bomford	Bentleigh Greens	10
10	(Australia) Emily Roach	South Melbourne	10
10	(Australia) Anais Josefski	Boroondara-Carey Eagles	10
10	(Australia) Sidney Allen	Alamein	10

=== Clean sheets ===
Rank	Player	Club	Clean sheets
1	(Australia) Erin Hudson	Bulleen Lions	9
2	(Australia) Charlotee Hrehoresin	Preston Lions	5
2	(Australia) Bethany Mason-Jones	Essendon Royals	5
2	(Australia) Mia Mossman	Boroondara-Carey Eagles	5
5	(Australia) Natasha Stathopoulos	Box Hill United	4

=== Hat-tricks ===
Player	For	Against	Result	Date
(Australia) Carina Rossi	FV Emerging	Calder United	4–2 (H)	16 March 2024
(Australia) Sidney Allen	Alamein	Bentleigh Greens	1–6 (A)	4 May 2024
(New Zealand) Deven Jackson	Box Hill United	South Melbourne	3–3 (H)	17 May 2024
(Australia) Audrey Oastler^{5}	Essendon Royals	Calder United	5–2 (H)	15 June 2024
(Australia) Maja Markovski^{4}	Bulleen Lions	Boroondara-Carey Eagles	6–2 (H)	22 June 2024
(New Zealand) Nicole Cooper	Brunswick Juventus	Calder United	5–0 (H)	22 June 2024
(Australia) Emily Roach	South Melbourne	Alamein	1–5 (A)	22 June 2024
(Japan) Kurea Okino	Boroondara-Carey Eagles	Essendon Royals	5–0 (H)	29 June 2024
(Japan) Mebae Tanaka	Preston Lions	Bentleigh Greens	1–7 (A)	13 July 2024
(Australia) Ellie La Monte	Preston Lions	Alamein	7–1 (H)	26 July 2024
(Australia) Alana Jancevski	Heidelberg United	Brunswick Juventus	6–2 (H)	10 August 2024
(Australia) Maja Markovski^{4}	Bulleen Lions	Calder United	8–0 (H)	24 August 2024

Note:
^{4} – player scored 4 goals
^{5} – player scored 5 goals

=== Discipline ===
==== Player ====
- Most yellow cards: 6
  - (Australia) Anna Liacopoulos (Boroondara-Carey Eagles)
- Most red cards: 1
  - (Australia) Danella Butrus (FV Emerging)
  - (Australia) Bryannen Gurr (Preston Lions)
  - (Australia) Katrina Nikpour (Bulleen Lions)
  - (Australia) Sophie Dehne (FV Emerging)
  - (Australia) Elly Torre (Brunswick Juventus)
  - (Australia) Olivia Edwards (Heidelberg United)
  - (Australia) Azhia Claridge (South Melbourne)

==== Club ====
- Most yellow cards: 24
  - Heidelberg United
- Fewest yellow cards: 12
  - Bentleigh Greens
  - Bulleen Lions
- Most red cards: 2
  - FV Emerging
- Fewest red cards: 0
  - Six teams

== End-of-season awards ==
The following awards were announced at the inaugural Victorian Football Gala night that took place on 13 September 2024.

- NPLW Gold Medal – Maja Markovski (Bulleen Lions) & Rebecca Saber (Alamein)
- Players' Player – Isabel Dehakiz (Bulleen Lions)
- Golden Boot – Maja Markovski (Bulleen Lions) (20 goals)
- Goalkeeper of the Year – Bethany Mason-Jones (Essendon Royals)
- Coach of the Year – Caitlin Friend (Bulleen Lions)
- NPLW Media Player of the Year – Maja Markovski (Bulleen Lions)
- NPLW Referee of the Year – Courtney Van Diesen

Team of the Seasons
Goalkeeper	(Australia) Bethany Mason-Jones (Essendon Royals)			
Defenders	(Australia) Julia Sardo (Essendon Royals)	(Australia) Anna Liacopoulos (Boroondara-Carey Eagles)	(Colombia) Isabel Dehakiz (Bulleen Lions)	(Serbia) Tyla Vlajnic (Essendon Royals)
Midfielders	(Australia) Sarah O'Donoghue (Heidelberg United)		(Australia) Sidney Allen (Alamein)	(Australia) Meisha Westland (South Melbourne)
Forwards	(United States) Haley Johnson (Preston Lions)		(Australia) Maja Markovski (Bulleen Lions)	(Australia) Ellie La Monte (Preston Lions)
