= 2025 National Premier Leagues Victoria Women =

Eighth edition of the top Victorian women's football (soccer) league

National Premier Leagues Victoria Women
- Season: 2025
- Dates: 14 March 2025 – 13 September 2025
- Champions: Box Hill United
- Premiers: Heidelberg United
- Matches: 132
- Goals: 457 (3.46 per match)
- Top goalscorer: Sawa Matsuda (18)
- Biggest home win: Bulleen Lions 8–0 Brunswick Juventus (30 August 2025)
- Biggest away win: Boroondara-Carey Eagles 0–5 South Melbourne (30 August 2025)
- Highest scoring: South Melbourne 7–2 FV Academy (22 March 2025); Box Hill United 7–2 Preston Lions (30 August 2025)
- Longest winning run: 9 matches Box Hill United; Heidelberg United
- Longest unbeaten run: 13 matches Heidelberg United
- Longest winless run: 9 matches Bentleigh Greens
- Longest losing run: 9 matches Bentleigh Greens
- All statistics correct as of 13 September 2025. (Note: Longest runs only include regular season results)

The 2025 National Premier Leagues Victoria Women, known commonly as the NPL VIC Women or NPLV Women, was the eighth season of the National Premier Leagues Victoria Women under the NPL format, and the 25th season of top-flight Victorian Women's football overall.

== Teams ==
Twelve teams competed in the league – the top eleven teams from the previous season and the team promoted from the VPL Women's. The promoted team was Spring Hills. They replaced Calder United who were relegated to the VPL Women's after seven seasons.

Casey Comets were originally planned to be promoted to the league, replacing Brunswick Juventus, but withdrew their acceptance of promotion into the league. After working through the Order of Merit process, Brunswick Juventus was offered the opportunity to remain in the competition which they accepted.

== Stadiums and locations ==
Locations of the 2025 NPL VIC Women clubs.

Team	Location	Stadium
Alamein	Glen Iris	Dorothy Laver West Reserve
Bentleigh Greens	Cheltenham	Kingston Heath Soccer Complex
Boroondara-Carey Eagles	Bulleen	David Barro Stadium
Box Hill United	Box Hill	Wembley Park
Brunswick Juventus	Fawkner	CB Smith Reserve
Bulleen Lions	Bulleen	David Barro Stadium
Essendon Royals	Essendon	Cross Keys Reserve
FV Emerging	Bundoora	Home of the Matildas
Heidelberg United	Heidelberg West	Olympic Park
Preston Lions FC	Reservoir	B.T. Connor Reserve
South Melbourne	Albert Park	Lakeside Stadium
Spring Hills	Caroline Springs	Springside Recreationa Reserve

== Regular season ==
=== League table ===
Pos	Team	Pld	W	D	L	GF	GA	GD	Pts	Qualification or relegation
1	Heidelberg United	22	16	2	4	52	31	+21	50	Qualification for finals series
2	Bulleen Lions	22	14	3	5	57	29	+28	45	Qualification for finals series
3	Box Hill United (C)	21	12	4	5	46	29	+17	40	Qualification for finals series
4	Essendon Royals	22	12	2	8	49	38	+11	38	Qualification for finals series
5	South Melbourne	22	10	7	5	43	25	+18	37	
6	Alamein	22	11	2	9	33	28	+5	35	
7	Boroondara-Carey Eagles	22	9	2	11	32	39	−7	29	
8	Spring Hills	22	7	7	8	31	31	0	28	
9	Preston Lions FC	22	6	5	11	34	43	−9	23	
10	FV Academy	22	5	5	12	33	65	−32	20	
11	Benleigh Greens (R)	21	4	2	15	27	40	−13	14	Relegation to VPLW
12	Brunswick Juventus (R)	22	4	1	17	20	59	−39	13	Relegation to VPLW

Updated to match(es) played on 13 September 2025. Source: NPL VIC Women
Rules for classification: 1) Points; 2) Goal difference; 3) Goals scored
(C) Champions; (R) Relegated

=== Results ===
Home \ Away	ALA	BEN	BOR	BOX	BRU	BUL	ESS	FVE	HEI	PRE	SOM	SPR
Alamein	—	1–3	2–1	3–1	4–0	1–3	1–2	5–1	1–1	2–0	0–3	0–0
Bentleigh Greens	1–0	—	1–2	0–1	1–0	0–1	1–2	1–2	1–2	0–1	1–1	2–2
Boroondara-Carey Eagles	3–0	1–2	—	0–2	5–1	0–1	2–1	1–0	2–3	2–0	0–5	1–1
Box Hill United	2–1	1–0	3–2	—	5–0	1–1	2–2	5–1	2–0	7–2	1–4	1–0
Brunswick Juventus	0–2	2–1	1–3	0–2	—	1–3	0–1	3–0	1–2	0–0	3–2	2–1
Bulleen Lions	0–1	4–2	3–0	2–1	8–0	—	3–5	5–0	1–2	0–3	3–3	3–1
Essendon Royals	2–4	3–2	5–0	2–2	2–0	1–0	—	3–0	0–3	1–3	3–0	1–3
FV Academy	0–2	4–2	3–1	2–2	4–2	2–6	1–5	—	2–5	2–2	0–0	2–2
Heidelberg United	4–1	3–1	4–0	3–0	2–0	1–4	3–2	4–2	—	4–2	1–5	2–1
Preston Lions FC	0–1	4–3	0–3	1–3	5–1	2–3	3–4	1–1	2–1	—	1–1	1–2
South Melbourne	1–0	1–0	1–1	0–1	3–1	2–2	2–1	7–2	0–1	1–0	—	1–1
Spring Hills	0–1	3–2	0–2	3–2	3–2	0–1	3–1	1–2	1–1	1–1	2–0	—

Updated to match(es) played on 30 August 2025. Source: NPL VIC Women
Legend: Blue = home team win; Yellow = draw; Red = away team win.

== Finals series ==
The finals series ran over two weeks, and involved the top four teams from the regular season. In the first week of fixtures, the four teams would play semi-finals with first playing fourth and second playing third. The two winners of those matches would meet in the Grand Final.

=== Bracket ===
Semi-finals
1	Heidelberg United	1
4	Essendon Royals	0
2	Bulleen Lions	1
3	Box Hill United	3

Grand Final
1	Heidelberg United	1
3	Box Hill United	2

=== Semi-finals ===
6 September 2025
16:00 AEST (UTC+10:00)

Bulleen Lions	1-3	Box Hill United
Butrus 17'	Report	Pollicina 25'; Aulicino 45+3'; Techera 83'

David Barro Stadium, Bulleen
Referee: Courtney Van Diesen

6 September 2025
16:15 AEST (UTC+10:00)

Heidelberg United	1-0	Essendon Royals
Matsuda 10'	Report

Olympic Park, Heidelberg West
Referee: Angelique Mangion

=== Grand Final ===
13 September 2025
16:00 AEST (UTC+10:00)

Heidelberg United	1-2	Box Hill United
Karic 68'	Report	Rossi 56', 60'

Home of the Matildas, Bundoora
Referee: Shab Saban

== Regular season statistics ==
=== Top scorers ===
Rank	Player	Club	Goals
1	(Japan) Sawa Matsuda	Heidelberg United	18
2	(Australia) Danella Butrus	Bulleen Lions	13
3	(Japan) Airi Fujiwara	Essendon Royals	12
4	(England) Valentine Pursey	Preston Lions	10
5	(United States) Josephine Aulicino	Box Hill United	9
6	(Australia) Emma Langley	Brunswick Juventus	8
7	(Australia) Zoe Houghton	Alamein	7
7	(Australia) Candela Ferreyra Bas	Boroondara-Carey Eagles	7
7	(India) Priya Savarirayan	Boroondara-Carey Eagles	7
7	(Australia) Carina Rossi	Box Hill United	7
7	(Australia) Katie Cox	Box Hill United	7
7	(England) Hollie Masey	Bulleen Lions	7
7	(Australia) Fiorina Iaria	FV Academy	7
7	(Canada) Nikki Furukawa	South Melbourne	7

=== Clean sheets ===
Rank	Player	Club	Clean sheets
1	(Australia) Zara Board	Essendon Royals	6
2	(Australia) Chloe McKenzie	Box Hill United	5
2	(Australia) Emily Shields	Bulleen Lions	5
4	(Australia) Olivia Cowan	Alamein	4
4	(Australia) Mia Mossman	Boroondara-Carey Eagles	4

=== Hat-tricks ===
Player	For	Against	Result	Date
(England) Valentine Pursey	Preston Lions	Bentleigh Greens	4–3 (H)	25 April 2025
(Japan) Sawa Matsuda	Heidelberg United	Preston Lions	4–2 (H)	17 May 2025
(Japan) Sawa Matsuda	Heidelberg United	Essendon Royals	3–2 (H)	31 May 2025
(United States) Josephine Aulicino	Box Hill United	FV Academy	5–1 (H)	8 August 2025
(Australia) Danella Butrus	Bulleen Lions	Brunswick Juventus	8–0 (H)	30 August 2025

=== Discipline ===
==== Player ====
- Most yellow cards: 6
  - (Australia) Maddison Rakic (Bulleen Lions)
- Most red cards: 1
  - (Australia) Amelia Tartaglia (FV Academy)
  - (Peru) Grace Cagnina (Bulleen Lions)
  - (Australia) Catherine Renehan (Bulleen Lions)
  - (Japan) Eri Narita (Preston Lions)
  - (Australia) Ellen Turner (Boroondara-Carey Eagles)
  - (Australia) Akeisha Sandhu (South Melbourne)
  - (Australia) Alana Burn (South Melbourne)
  - (Australia) Teresa Morrissey (Box Hill United)

==== Club ====
- Most yellow cards: 21
  - Brunswick Juventus
  - South Melbourne
- Fewest yellow cards: 11
  - Bentleigh Greens
- Most red cards: 2
  - Bulleen Lions
  - South Melbourne
- Fewest red cards: 0
  - Six teams

== End-of-season awards ==
The following awards were announced at the Victorian Football Gala night that took place on 19 September 2025.

- NPLW Gold Medal – Aleksandra Sinclair (Spring Hills) & Danella Butrus (Bulleen Lions)
- Players' Player – Keely Lockhart (Heidelberg United)
- Golden Boot – Sawa Matsuda (Heidelberg United) (18 goals)
- Goalkeeper of the Year – Peyton Woodward (Brunswick Juventus)
- Coach of the Year – Dennis Georgakopoulos (Heidelberg United)
- Goal of the Year – Danella Butrus (Bulleen Lions)
- NPLW Media Player of the Year – Danella Butrus (Bulleen Lions)
- NPLW Referee of the Year – Shab Saban
- NPLW Assistant Referee of the Year – Daphne Gounaris

Team of the Season
Goalkeeper	(United States) Payton Woodward (Brunswick Juventus)			
Defenders	(Australia) Hayley Geurts (Boroondara-Carey Eagles)		(New Zealand) Rosie Wild (Heidelberg United)	(Australia) Cameron Barreiro (Heidelberg United)
Midfielders	(Australia) Asuka Miyata (Heidelberg United)	(Australia) Aleksandra Sinclair (Spring Hills)	(Australia) Tiffany Eliadis (Bulleen Lions)	(Australia) Danella Butrus (Bulleen Lions)
Forwards	(Japan) Airi Fujiwara (Essendon Royals)		(Japan) Sawa Matsuda (Heidelberg United)	(United States) Josephine Aulicino (Box Hill United)
