= 2023 National Premier Leagues Victoria Women =

Sixth edition of the top Victorian women's football (soccer) league

National Premier Leagues Victoria Women
- Season: 2023
- Dates: 17 March 2023 – 10 September 2023
- Champions: South Melbourne
- Premiers: Bulleen Lions
- Matches: 110
- Goals: 414 (3.76 per match)
- Top goalscorer: Kurea Okino (31 goals)
- Biggest home win: Boroondara-Carey Eagles 7–0; Box Hill United (17 June 2023)
- Biggest away win: Heidelberg United 0–6; Calder United (16 July 2023)
- Highest scoring: Heidelberg United 4–5; Boroondara-Carey Eagles (12 May 2023); Alamein 7-2 Heidelberg United (5 August 2023)
- Longest winning run: 4 matches Boroondara-Carey Eagles, Box Hill United, Bulleen Lions
- Longest unbeaten run: 10 matches Bulleen Lions
- Longest winless run: 15 matches Southern United
- Longest losing run: 7 matches Southern United
- All statistics correct as of 9 July 2023. (Note: Longest runs only include regular season results)

The 2023 National Premier Leagues Victoria Women, known commonly as the NPL Victoria Women's or NPLV Women's, is the ongoing sixth season of the National Premier Leagues Victoria Women under the NPL format, and the 23rd season of top-flight Victorian Women's football overall.

== Teams ==
Eleven teams are competing in the league – the eight teams from the previous season and the three teams promoted from the VPL Women's. This was the first time teams could be promoted since the restructuring of the women's divisions for the 2020 season. The promoted teams are Preston Lions FC, Boroondara-Carey Eagles, and Southern United.

=== Stadiums and locations ===
Locations of 2023 NPL VIC Women clubs.

Team	Location	Stadium
Alamein	Glen Iris	Dorothy Laver West Reserve
Bayside United	Cheltenham	Kingston Heath Soccer Complex
Boroondara-Carey Eagles	Bulleen	David Barro Stadium
Box Hill United	Box Hill	Wembley Park
Bulleen Lions	Bulleen	David Barro Stadium
Calder United	Keilor Park	Keilor Park Recreation Reserve
FV Emerging	Wantirna South	Knox Regional Football Centre
Heidelberg United	Heidelberg West	Olympic Park
Preston Lions FC	Reservoir	B.T. Connor Reserve
South Melbourne	Albert Park	Lakeside Stadium
Southern United	Clyde North	Selandra Recreation Reserve

== League table ==
Pos	Team	Pld	W	D	L	GF	GA	GD	Pts	Qualification or relegation
1	Bulleen Lions	20	11	7	2	36	19	+17	40	Qualification for finals series
2	Boroondara-Carey Eagles	20	12	2	6	61	42	+19	38	Qualification for finals series
3	South Melbourne	20	10	6	4	40	25	+15	36	Qualification for finals series
4	Calder United	20	10	5	5	47	28	+19	35	Qualification for finals series
5	Alamein	20	8	7	5	44	39	+5	31	
6	Preston Lions FC	20	8	5	7	32	32	0	29	
7	Box Hill United	20	9	2	9	38	40	−2	29	
8	Bayside United	20	7	2	11	33	40	−7	23	
9	Heidelberg United	20	6	5	9	34	44	−10	23	
10	FV Emerging	20	4	5	11	33	49	−16	17	
11	Southern United	20	0	4	16	16	56	−40	4	Relegation to VPL Women's

Updated to match(es) played on 18 August 2023. Source: NPL VIC Women
Rules for classification: 1) Points; 2) Goal difference; 3) Goals scored

== Results ==
The fixtures were released on 1 December 2022.

Home \ Away	ALA	BAY	BOR	BOX	BUL	CAL	FVE	HEI	PRE	SOM	SOU
Alamein	—	2–2	3–3	0–3	2–4	0–5	3–1	7–2	1–1	3–3	5–1
Bayside United	2–3	—	2–1	3–1	2–0	0–1	1–3	0–2	0–1	0–4	3–0
Boroondara-Carey Eagles	3–0	2–1	—	7–0	2–3	3–2	3–2	2–4	1–4	0–2	4–1
Box Hill United	0–2	2–1	1–5	—	0–1	3–3	2–5	2–0	2–0	1–1	3–0
Bulleen Lions	2–1	4–2	2–2	3–0	—	1–1	0–0	2–0	1–1	1–1	3–0
Calder United	2–4	6–2	3–4	1–3	0–0	—	3–0	4–2	2–1	2–0	2–1
FV Emerging	1–3	4–4	2–3	1–4	1–2	1–1	—	3–2	1–3	1–6	1–1
Heidelberg United	0–0	0–3	4–5	3–2	1–1	0–6	3–0	—	1–1	2–0	6–1
Preston Lions FC	3–3	0–1	2–5	1–5	2–1	1–0	1–1	3–0	—	1–4	2–0
South Melbourne	0–1	2–1	4–3	1–0	1–3	1–1	2–1	1–1	3–1	—	2–0
Southern United	1–1	2–3	0–3	2–4	0–2	1–2	2–4	1–1	0–3	2–2	—

Updated to match(es) played on 18 August 2023. Source: NPL VIC Women
Legend: Blue = home team win; Yellow = draw; Red = away team win.

== Season statistics ==
=== Top scorers ===
As of 18 August 2023

Rank	Player	Club	Goals
1	(Japan) Kurea Okino	Boroondara-Carey Eagles	31
2	(Australia) Danielle Wise	South Melbourne	15
3	(Australia) Sidney Allen	Alamein	13
4	(United States) Kayla Deaver	Bayside United	11
4	(Australia) Nicole Blackett	Heidelberg United	11
4	(Australia) Raquel Deralas	Calder United	11
4	(New Zealand) Tayla Christensen	South Melbourne	11
8	(Japan) Asuka Doi	Box Hill United	10
8	(Japan) Keiwa Hieda	Calder United	10
10	(Australia) Kaitlyn Torpey	Preston Lions FC	9
10	(Australia) Melindaj Barbieri	Box Hill United	9

==== Hat-tricks ====
Player	For	Against	Result	Date
(Japan) Kurea Okino	Boroondara-Carey Eagles	Box Hill United	1–5 (A)	31 March 2023
(Australia) Sidney Allen	Alamein	Southern United	5–1 (H)	1 April 2023
(Australia) Emilie Keppens	FV Emerging	Bayside United	4–4 (H)	7 April 2023
(Japan) Kurea Okino	Boroondara-Carey Eagles	Alamein	3–0 (H)	8 April 2023
(Australia) Nicole Blackett	Heidelberg United	Southern United	6–1 (H)	6 May 2023
(Australia) Georgia Beaumont	Heidelberg United	Boroondara-Carey Eagles	4–5 (H)	12 May 2023
(France) Margot Robinne	Boroondara-Carey Eagles	FV Emerging	3–2 (H)	20 May 2023
(Australia) Raquel Deralas	Calder United	Bayside United	6–2 (H)	27 May 2023
(Australia) Raquel Deralas	Calder United	Alamein	6–2 (H)	10 June 2023
(Japan) Kurea Okino	Boroondara-Carey Eagles	Box Hill United	7–0 (H)	17 June 2023
(Japan) Kurea Okino	Boroondara-Carey Eagles	Calder United	3–4 (A)	8 July 2023
(Australia) Maja Markovski	Bulleen Lions	Bayside United	4–2 (H)	8 July 2023
(Japan) Kurea Okino	Boroondara-Carey Eagles	Southern United	4–1 (H)	15 July 2023
(Australia) Melindaj Barbieri	Box Hill United	Preston Lions FC	1–5 (A)	18 August 2023

=== Top assists ===
As of 18 August 2023

Rank	Player	Club	Assists
1	(Australia) Sidney Allen	Alamein	9
2	(Australia) Anika Dovaston	FV Emerging	8
2	(Australia) Becky Lim	Boroondara-Carey Eagles	8
2	(Japan) Miri Nishimura	Preston Lions	8
5	(Australia) Kristina Hall	Boroondara-Carey Eagles	7
5	(Japan) Kiewa Hieda	Calder United	7
7	(Australia) Hayley Geurts	Boroondara-Carey Eagles	6
7	(Australia) Ashleigh Lefevre	Alamein	6
7	(France) Margot Robinne	Boroondara-Carey Eagles	6
7	(Australia) Rebecca Saber	Alamein	6

=== Clean sheets ===
As of 9 July 2023

Rank	Player	Club	Clean sheets
1	(Australia) Natalie Picak	Calder United	6
1	(Argentina) Gaby Garton	Bulleen Lions	6
3	(Australia) Christine Fonua	Preston Lions FC	5
4	(Australia) Coco Majstorovic	Bayside United	4
5	(Australia) Ava Walters	Box Hill United	3
5	(Australia) Deanna Bottalico	Boroondara-Carey Eagles	3
7	(Australia) Zara Board	South Melbourne	2
7	(Australia) Natasha Stathopoulos	Heidelberg United	2
7	(Australia) Melissa Maizels	Heidelberg United	2
7	(Australia) Kate Bean	Alamein	2
7	(Australia) Alyssa Dall'Oste	Calder United	2
7	(Australia) Miranda Templeman	South Melbourne	2

=== Discipline ===
==== Player ====
- Most yellow cards: 5
  - (Australia) Elsa Sousa (Bayside United)
  - (Australia) Leia Varley (South Melbourne)
  - (Australia) Maddison Rakic (Bayside United)
- Most red cards: 1
  - (Australia) Rebecca Saber (Alamein)
  - (Australia) Bella Stringfellow (South Melbourne)
  - (Australia) Bronwyn Maidment (Southern United)
  - (Australia) Elsa Sousa (Bayside United)
  - (Australia) Karina Tolios (Heidelberg United)
  - (Australia) Lisa Fonua (Preston Lions)
  - (United States) Kayla Deaver (Bayside United)
  - (Australia) Alyssa Rose (Southern United)
  - (Australia) Annabelle Yates (FV Emerging)
  - (Australia) Katrina Nikpour (Heidelberg United)

==== Club ====
- Most yellow cards: 24
  - Bayside United
- Fewest yellow cards: 7
  - Boroondara-Carey Eagles
  - Bulleen Lions
- Most red cards: 2
  - Bayside United
  - Southern United
- Fewest red cards: 0
  - Five teams

== Finals Series ==
South Melbourne would beat Bulleen Lions 4-2 in the NPL Victoria Women's Grand Final.

Semifinals
2 September - David Barro Stadium
1	Bulleen Lions (a.e.t.)	2
4	Calder United	1
2 September - David Barro Stadium
2	Boroondara-Carey Eagles	1
3	South Melbourne	2

Final
9 September - Home of the Matildas
1	Bulleen Lions	2
3	South Melbourne	4
