= 2026 National Premier Leagues Victoria Women =

Eighth edition of the top Victorian women's football (soccer) league

National Premier Leagues Victoria Women
- Season: 2026
- Dates: 13 February 2026 – 30 August 2026
- Champions: TBD
- Premiers: TBD
- All statistics correct as of 5 February 2025. (Note: Longest runs only include regular season results)

The 2026 National Premier Leagues Victoria Women, known commonly as the NPL VIC Women or NPLV Women, was the ninth season of the National Premier Leagues Victoria Women under the NPL format, and the 26th season of top-flight Victorian Women's football overall.

== Teams ==
Fourteen teams competed in the league – the top eleven teams from the previous season and two teams promoted from the VPL Women's. The promoted teams were Avondale FC and Keilor Park. Alongside these teams Football Victoria announce on 21 August 2025, that A-League Women Clubs Melbourne Victory and Melbourne City would enter an academy team into the 2026 NPLW Victoria season after years of collective lobbying. They would replace FV Emerging team.

== Stadiums and locations ==
Locations of the 2025 NPL VIC Women clubs

Team	Location	Stadium
Alamein	Glen Iris	Dorothy Laver West Reserve
Avondale FC	Parkville	Avenger Park
Bentleigh Greens	Cheltenham	Kingston Heath Soccer Complex
Boroondara-Carey Eagles	Bulleen	David Barro Stadium
Box Hill United	Box Hill	Wembley Park
Bulleen Lions	Bulleen	David Barro Stadium
Essendon Royals	Essendon	Cross Keys Reserve
Keilor Park	Keilor Park	Keilor Park Reserve
Melbourne City Youth	Cranbourne East	City Football Academy
Melbourne Victory Youth	Bundoora	Home of the Matildas
Heidelberg United	Heidelberg West	Olympic Park
Preston Lions FC	Reservoir	B.T. Connor Reserve
South Melbourne	Albert Park	Lakeside Stadium
Spring Hills	Caroline Springs	Springside Recreationa Reserve

== Regular season ==
Pos	Team	Pld	W	D	L	GF	GA	GD	Pts	Qualification or relegation
1	Box Hill United	26	19	3	4	67	27	+40	60	Qualification for finals series
2	Essendon Royals	26	18	2	6	77	31	+46	56	Qualification for finals series
3	Avondale FC	26	16	4	6	65	27	+38	52	Qualification for finals series
4	Bulleen Lions	26	16	4	6	59	28	+31	52	Qualification for finals series
5	South Melbourne	26	13	6	7	49	25	+24	45	Qualification for finals series
6	Boroondara-Carey Eagles	26	14	3	9	53	40	+13	45	Qualification for finals series
7	Alamein FC	26	13	3	10	34	27	+7	42	
8	Melbourne Victory Youth	26	11	2	13	48	54	−6	35	
9	Heidelberg United	26	9	5	12	38	48	−10	32	
10	Preston Lions FC	26	8	6	12	31	47	−16	30	
11	Keilor Park	26	7	6	13	25	45	−20	27	
12	Spring Hills	26	8	2	16	30	46	−16	26	
13	Bentleigh Greens (R)	26	3	3	20	22	81	−59	12	Relegation to VPLW
14	Melbourne City Youth (R)	26	2	1	23	22	94	−72	7	Relegation to VPLW

Updated to match(es) played on 30 August 2026. Source: Dribl
Rules for classification: 1) points; 2) goal difference; 3) number of goals scored; 4) aggregate head-to-head results; 5) away goals; 6) alphabetical order/coin toss at the end of the season.
(R) Relegated

=== Results ===
Home \ Away	ALA	AVO	BEN	BOR	BOX	BUL	ESS	HEI	KPK	MCY	MVC	PRE	SMB	SPR
Alamein FC	—	1–0												
Avondale FC		—				3–0								
Bentleigh Greens			—		0–8								1–5	
Boroondara-Carey Eagles			3–1	—										
Box Hill United					—		1–3					2–1		
Bulleen Lions						—			4–0		0–1			
Essendon Royals				1–3			—							
Heidelberg United								—				0–1	1–1	
Keilor Park	0–0								—					
Melbourne City Youth				1–4						—				0–1
Melbourne Victory Youth								2–2			—			
Preston Lions FC												—	1–1	
South Melbourne													—	
Spring Hills							0–1		1–1					—

Updated to match(es) played on 28 February 2026. Source: Dribl
Legend: Blue = home team win; Yellow = draw; Red = away team win.

== Finals series ==
The finals series ran over three weeks, and involved the top six teams from the regular season. In the second week of fixtures, the four teams would play semi-finals with first playing fourth and second playing third. The two winners of those matches would meet in the Grand Final.

=== Bracket ===
Qualifying finals
4	Bulleen Lions	2
5	South Melbourne	1
3	Avondale FC	5
6	Boroondara-Carey Eagles	3

Semi finals
1	Box Hill United	2
4	Bulleen Lions	0
2	Essendon Royals
3	Avondale FC

Grand final
1	Box Hill United

=== Qualifying finals ===
v

v

=== Semi-finals ===
v

v

=== Grand Final ===
v
