= National Premier Leagues Women's =

- Founded: 2014
- Country: Australia
- Divisions: ACT; NSW; Northern NSW; Queensland; South Australia; Victoria; Western Australia
- Number of clubs: 63 clubs (from 7 federations)
- Level on pyramid: 2

The National Premier Leagues Women's (NPLW), also referred to as Women's National Premier Leagues (WNPL) in some states, are regional association football competitions in some states and territories in Australia, which act as the second tier of the sport in the country below the A-League Women. The WNPL consists of the highest level state league in a subset of the state-based federations within Australia, and is overseen by Football Australia (FA) in partnership with participating member federations.

With the addition of Northern NSW in 2022, the WNPL is now contested by clubs from seven member federations: Capital Football (ACT), NSW, Northern NSW, Queensland, South Australia, Victoria and Western Australia.

== History ==
In October 2010, (FFA) commenced a National Competition Review, its main objective being to review the current structure of soccer competitions in Australia, and to monitor and improve elite player development. NSW were the first federation to commence a competition, after a review on women's football in NSW in 2013, which looked at staying aligned with the FFA's pathway for women's football program.

Queensland switched to the NPL format in 2015, followed by South Australia and Victoria in 2016, the ACT (Capital Football) in 2017, Western Australia in 2020, and Northern NSW in 2022.

== Competition format and teams ==
The WNPL competitions in each state and territory are run independently by the member federations, with a similar format to the equivalent men's competition - the National Premier Leagues. Teams may be relegated from the WNPL to a third-tier league in the same state (and vice versa), but there is currently no mechanism for a team to be promoted to the first tier of Australian Football, the A-League Women. The number of teams promoted and relegated from third-tier leagues per state has varied over time. The table below details the number of teams relegated automatically from the WNPL at the end of the season and the number of NPL teams which go into a relegation playoff against a lower league team.

| Federation | Number of Clubs | | Current Season |
| Federation | Automatic Relegation | Relegation Playoffs | Current Season |
|---|---|---|---|
| ACT | none | | 2026 NPL ACT Women's |
| NSW | 1 | 0 | 2026 National Premier Leagues NSW Women's |
| NNSW | not known | | 2026 NPL Women's Northern NSW |
| Queensland | 1 | 0 | 2026 Women's NPL Queensland |
| SA | 1 | 0 | 2026 Women's NPL SA |
| Victoria | 2 | 0 | 2026 NPL VIC Women |
| WA | 1 | 0 | 2026 Women's NPL WA |

=== Current clubs ===
Below are listed the National Premier Leagues clubs in each member federation that competed in the 2026 season.

| ACT Belconnen United Canberra Croatia Canberra Olympic Majura FC Tuggeranong United West Canberra Wanderers | NSW APIA Leichhardt Bulls FC Academy Gladesville Ravens Hills United Illawarra Stingrays Macarthur Rams Manly United Northern Tigers NWS Spirit Sydney Olympic Sydney University UNSW FC Western City Rangers Western Sydney Wanderers | Northern NSW Adamstown Rosebud Broadmeadow Magic Charlestown Azzurri Lake Macquarie City Maitland FC Newcastle Olympic New Lambton FC | Queensland Brisbane City Capalaba Eastern Suburbs FQ Academy of Sport Gold Coast United Gold Coast Knights Lions FC Olympic FC Souths United Sunshine Coast Wanderers | South Australia Adelaide City Adelaide Comets Adelaide University Flinders United Football SA NTC Fulham United Metro United Salisbury Inter West Adelaide West Torrens Birkalla | Victoria Alamein Avondale FC Bentleigh Greens Boroondara-Carey Eagles Box Hill United Bulleen Lions Essendon Royals Heidelberg United Keilor Park Melbourne City Youth Melbourne Victory Youth Preston Lions FC South Melbourne Spring Hills | Western Australia Balcatta Football West NTC U-19 Fremantle City Perth Azzurri Perth RedStar Sorrento FC Subiaco AFC UWA-Nedlands FC |

== Honours ==
=== Premiers by season ===
Federations commenced under the WNPL Structure in different years.

| Season | ACT | New South Wales | Northern NSW | Queensland | South Australia | Victoria | Western Australia |
|---|---|---|---|---|---|---|---|
| 2014 | | Macarthur Rams | | | | | |
| 2015 | | Macarthur Rams | | The Gap | | | |
| 2016 | | Sydney University | | The Gap | Metro United | Calder United | |
| 2017 | Belconnen United | Macarthur Rams | | Peninsula Power | West Adelaide | South Melbourne | |
| 2018 | Belconnen United | Sydney University | | The Gap | Metro United | South Melbourne | |
| 2019 | Belconnen United | Sydney University | | Lions FC | Adelaide City | Calder United | |
| 2020 | Canberra Croatia | Sydney University | | Gold Coast United | Adelaide City | — (Note: Cancelled due to the COVID-19 pandemic in Australia.) | — (Note: In 2020, no Premier was declared for WA.) |
| 2021 | Canberra Croatia | — (Note: Cancelled due to the COVID-19 pandemic in Australia.) | | Lions FC | Salisbury Inter | — (Note: Cancelled due to the COVID-19 pandemic in Australia.) | Murdoch University Melville |
| 2022 | Canberra Croatia | Sydney University | Warners Bay | Lions FC | West Adelaide | Calder United | Perth RedStar |
| 2023 | Canberra Olympic | APIA Leichhardt | Broadmeadow Magic | Lions FC | Adelaide Comets | Bulleen Lions | Perth RedStar |
| 2024 | Canberra Olympic | Macarthur Rams | Maitland FC | Brisbane City | West Adelaide | Bulleen Lions | Perth RedStar |
| 2025 | Belconnen United | Bulls FC Academy | Charlestown Azzurri | Gold Coast Knights | West Adelaide | Heidelberg United | Perth SC |
| 2026 | Belconnen United | Bulls FC Academy | Maitland FC | Gold Coast Knights | West Adelaide | Box Hill United Pythagoras | Perth Azzurri |

== See also ==
- National Premier Leagues Men's
- Football Australia
- Australian soccer league system
