= 2017 Football Federation Victoria season =

Football Federation Victoria
- Season: 2017

The 2017 Football Federation Victoria season was the fourth season under the new competition format for state-level football (soccer) in Victoria. The competition consists of seven divisions across the state of Victoria.

== League Tables ==
=== 2017 National Premier Leagues Victoria ===
NPL Victoria
- Season: 2017
- Champions: Bentleigh Greens
- Premiers: Heidelberg United
- Relegated: North Geelong; St Albans
- Top goalscorer: Davey Van't Schip (14 goals)

The 2017 National Premier Leagues Victoria season was played over 26 rounds. The overall premier of this division qualified for the 2017 National Premier Leagues finals series, competing with the other state federation champions in a final knockout tournament to decide the National Premier Leagues champion for 2017.

Pos	Team	Pld	W	D	L	GF	GA	GD	Pts	Qualification or relegation
1	Heidelberg United	26	17	3	6	53	27	+26	54	2017 National Premier Leagues Finals
2	South Melbourne	26	15	3	8	49	28	+21	48	2017 Victoria Finals
3	Avondale FC	26	14	6	6	28	21	+7	48	2017 Victoria Finals
4	Bentleigh Greens (C)	26	13	7	6	44	30	+14	46	2017 Victoria Finals
5	Green Gully	26	12	9	5	50	37	+13	45	2017 Victoria Finals
6	Oakleigh Cannons	26	11	10	5	43	23	+20	43	2017 Victoria Finals
7	Pascoe Vale	26	12	7	7	35	27	+8	43	
8	Hume City	26	9	8	9	31	26	+5	35	
9	Bulleen Lions	26	9	5	12	39	42	−3	32	
10	Kingston City	26	8	7	11	37	42	−5	31	
11	Port Melbourne	26	7	6	13	36	44	−8	27	
12	Melbourne Knights	26	6	6	14	31	48	−17	24	2017 relegation play-offs
13	St Albans Saints (R)	26	3	6	17	20	56	−36	15	Relegation to the 2018 NPL Victoria 2
14	North Geelong Warriors (R)	26	1	7	18	21	67	−46	10	Relegation to the 2018 NPL Victoria 2

Source: sportstg.com
Rules for classification: 1) points; 2) goal difference; 3) number of goals scored.
(C) Champions; (R) Relegated

==== Finals ====
Elimination Finals
3	Avondale	1
6	Oakleigh Cannons (aet)	2
4	Bentleigh Greens	4
5	Green Gully	0

Semi-finals
1	Heidelberg United	2
6	Oakleigh Cannons	0
2	South Melbourne	2 (3)
4	Bentleigh Greens	2 (5)

Final
1	Heidelberg United	1
4	Bentleigh Greens (aet)	2

==== Promotion/relegation play-off ====
West vs East			Promotion/relegation play-off
			12	Melbourne Knights	3
W2	Moreland Zebras	0	E2	Dandenong City	2
E2	Dandenong City	1

=== 2017 National Premier Leagues Victoria 2 ===
==== West ====
NPL Victoria 2 West
- Season: 2017
- Promoted: Northcote City
- Relegated: Bendigo City
- Top goalscorer: Trent Rixon (18 goals)

The 2017 National Premier Leagues Victoria 2 West was played over 28 rounds, with each team playing the teams in their conference twice and the other conference once. The top team at the end of the season was promoted to National Premier Leagues Victoria, while the second placed team entered the promotion play-off.

Pos	Team	Pld	W	D	L	GF	GA	GD	Pts	Qualification or relegation
1	Northcote City (P)	28	20	5	3	59	27	+32	65	Promotion to the 2018 NPL Victoria
2	Moreland Zebras	28	18	6	4	72	26	+46	60	2017 promotion play-offs
3	Moreland City	28	13	7	8	54	41	+13	46	
4	Sunshine George Cross	28	13	7	8	41	33	+8	46	
5	Whittlesea Ranges	28	11	6	11	55	43	+12	39	
6	Brunswick City	28	10	6	12	42	47	−5	36	
7	Ballarat City	28	10	5	13	47	51	−4	35	
8	Werribee City	28	10	5	13	31	41	−10	35	
9	Melbourne Victory Youth	28	8	5	15	55	56	−1	29	
10	Bendigo City (R)	28	0	2	26	20	125	−105	2	Withdrew at the end of the season

Updated to match(es) played on 26 August 2017. Source: sportstg.com
Rules for classification: 1) points; 2) goal difference; 3) number of goals scored.
(P) Promoted; (R) Relegated

==== East ====
NPL Victoria 2 East
- Season: 2017
- Champions: Dandenong Thunder
- Promoted: Dandenong Thunder
- Relegated: Richmond
- Top goalscorer: Brandon Barnes (27 goals)

The 2017 National Premier Leagues Victoria 2 East was played over 28 rounds, with each team playing the teams in their conference twice and the other conference once. The top team at the end of the season was promoted to National Premier Leagues Victoria, while the second placed team entered the promotion play-off.

Pos	Team	Pld	W	D	L	GF	GA	GD	Pts	Qualification or relegation
1	Dandenong Thunder (C, P)	28	19	6	3	74	34	+40	61 (Note: Dandenong Thunder had two points deducted for misconduct.)	Promotion to the 2018 NPL Victoria
2	Dandenong City	28	15	5	8	58	33	+25	50	2017 promotion play-offs
3	Melbourne City Youth	28	11	8	9	68	49	+19	41	
4	Goulburn Valley Suns	28	11	8	9	56	53	+3	41	
5	Murray United	28	11	6	11	49	41	+8	39	
6	Eastern Lions	28	9	6	13	42	54	−12	33	
7	Springvale White Eagles	28	10	4	14	44	58	−14	32 (Note: Springvale White Eagles had two points deducted for misconduct.)	
8	Box Hill United	28	6	13	9	44	51	−7	31	
9	Nunawading City	28	8	5	15	53	68	−15	29	
10	Richmond (R)	28	6	7	15	36	69	−33	25	Relegation to the 2018 State League 1

Updated to match(es) played on 26 August 2017. Source: sportstg.com
Rules for classification: 1) points; 2) goal difference; 3) number of goals scored.
(C) Champions; (P) Promoted; (R) Relegated

==== Grand Final ====
The NPL2 Season concluded with a single match between the winners of the leagues in the West and East sections, to determine the NPL2 Champion.

3 September 2017

Dandenong Thunder	2–0 (a.e.t.)	Northcote City

=== 2017 Victoria State League 1 ===
==== North-West ====
Victorian State League 1 North-West
- Season: 2017
- Champions: Altona Magic
- Promoted: Altona Magic
- Relegated: Altona East Phoenix; Westgate
- Biggest home win: Preston Lions 7-0 Westgate, June 11
- Biggest away win: North Sunshine Eagles 0-6 Altona Magic, June 24
- Highest scoring: Westgate 3-8 Banyule City, April 22

Pos	Team	Pld	W	D	L	GF	GA	GD	Pts	Qualification or relegation
1	Altona Magic (C, P)	22	17	2	3	49	20	+29	53	Promotion to the 2018 NPL Victoria 2
2	Geelong	22	14	3	5	48	24	+24	45	
3	North Sunshine Eagles	22	12	6	4	50	29	+21	42	
4	Preston Lions	22	11	4	7	42	26	+16	37	
5	Sydenham Park	22	10	5	7	43	37	+6	35	
6	Banyule City	22	9	4	9	38	30	+8	31	
7	Keilor Park	22	9	4	9	28	32	−4	31	
8	Western Suburbs	22	7	4	11	31	40	−9	25	
9	Essendon Royals	22	5	6	11	29	47	−18	21	
10	Yarraville	22	5	5	12	30	43	−13	20	
11	Westgate FC (R)	22	4	4	14	30	62	−32	16	Relegation to the 2018 State League 2
12	Altona East Phoenix (R)	22	4	3	15	19	47	−28	15	Relegation to the 2018 State League 2

(C) Champions; (P) Promoted; (R) Relegated

==== South-East ====
Victorian State League 1 South-East
- Season: 2017
- Champions: Langwarrin
- Promoted: Langwarrin
- Relegated: Mooroolbark

Pos	Team	Pld	W	D	L	GF	GA	GD	Pts	Qualification or relegation
1	Langwarrin (C, P)	22	14	4	4	54	31	+23	46	Promotion to the 2018 NPL Victoria 2
2	Mornington	22	14	3	5	50	24	+26	45	
3	Caulfield United Cobras	22	12	3	7	38	29	+9	39	
4	Warragul United	22	11	3	8	36	28	+8	36	
5	Clifton Hill	22	10	4	8	35	28	+7	34	
6	Malvern City	22	9	6	7	32	31	+1	33	
7	Manningham United	22	8	6	8	26	29	−3	30	
8	Casey Comets	22	8	5	9	34	31	+3	29	
9	Morwell Pegasus	22	9	0	13	31	37	−6	27	
10	St Kilda SC	22	7	4	11	24	32	−8	25	
11	South Springvale	22	5	5	12	20	43	−23	20	
12	Mooroolbark (R)	22	2	3	17	22	59	−37	9	Relegation to the 2018 State League 2

(C) Champions; (P) Promoted; (R) Relegated

=== 2017 Victoria State League 2 ===
==== North-West ====
Victorian State League 2 North-West
- Season: 2017
- Champions: Altona City
- Promoted: Altona City; Hoppers Crossing SC
- Relegated: Essendon United FC; Moreland United SC

Pos	Team	Pld	W	D	L	GF	GA	GD	Pts	Qualification or relegation
1	Altona City (C, P)	22	16	5	1	56	13	+43	53	Promotion to the 2018 State League 1
2	Hoppers Crossing (P)	22	16	2	4	61	26	+35	50	Promotion to the 2018 State League 1
3	Fitzroy City	22	14	4	4	54	22	+32	46	
4	Hume United	22	13	5	4	57	32	+25	44	
5	Corio	22	13	3	6	55	37	+18	42	
6	Geelong Rangers	22	9	3	10	45	48	−3	30	
7	Sporting Whittlesea	22	8	4	10	50	58	−8	28	
8	Cairnlea FC	22	5	6	11	34	48	−14	21	
9	Westvale SC	22	6	3	13	28	53	−25	21	
10	Diamond Valley United	22	5	3	14	34	65	−31	18	
11	Essendon United (R)	22	4	1	17	18	44	−26	13	Relegation to the 2018 State League 3
12	Moreland United (R)	22	3	1	18	19	65	−46	10	Relegation to the 2018 State League 3

(C) Champions; (P) Promoted; (R) Relegated

==== South-East ====
Victorian State League 2 South-East
- Season: 2017
- Champions: Eltham Redbacks
- Promoted: Beaumaris SC; Eltham Redbacks
- Relegated: Seaford United SC

Pos	Team	Pld	W	D	L	GF	GA	GD	Pts	Qualification or relegation
1	Eltham Redbacks (C, P)	22	16	2	4	56	21	+35	50	Promotion to the 2018 State League 1
2	Beaumaris (P)	22	15	2	5	59	29	+30	47	Promotion to the 2018 State League 1
3	Doveton	22	15	2	5	48	29	+19	47	
4	Berwick City	22	13	4	5	52	27	+25	43	
5	Mazenod United	22	12	3	7	55	34	+21	39	
6	Old Scotch	22	8	5	9	30	37	−7	29	
7	Heatherton United	22	8	3	11	36	47	−11	27	
8	Frankston Pines	22	6	5	11	19	34	−15	23	
9	Doncaster Rovers	22	6	4	12	32	42	−10	22	
10	North Caulfield	22	7	1	14	29	44	−15	22	
11	Peninsula Strikers	22	4	5	13	28	50	−22	17	
12	Seaford United (R)	22	3	2	17	28	79	−51	11	Relegation to the 2018 State League 3

(C) Champions; (P) Promoted; (R) Relegated

=== 2017 Victoria State League 3 ===
==== North-West ====
Victorian State League 3 North-West
- Season: 2017
- Champions: Brimbank Stallions
- Promoted: Brimbank Stallions; Whittlesea United
- Relegated: Melbourne City FC; Melbourne University

Pos	Team	Pld	W	D	L	GF	GA	GD	Pts	Qualification or relegation
1	Brimbank Stallions (C, P)	22	15	1	6	50	21	+29	46	Promotion to the 2018 State League 2
2	Whittlesea United (P)	22	14	3	5	59	26	+33	45	Promotion to the 2018 State League 2
3	FC Strathmore	22	12	7	3	57	23	+34	43	
4	Williamstown SC	22	12	5	5	64	28	+36	41	
5	Epping City	22	10	9	3	33	17	+16	39	
6	La Trobe University	22	11	3	8	47	30	+17	36	
7	Heidelberg Stars	22	10	0	12	38	34	+4	30	
8	Upfield SC	22	7	8	7	36	42	−6	29	
9	Sunbury United	22	7	2	13	36	44	−8	23	
10	Fawkner SC	22	5	5	12	36	52	−16	20	
11	Melbourne University (R)	22	5	4	13	39	43	−4	19	Relegation to the 2018 State League 4
12	Melbourne City (R)	22	0	1	21	10	145	−135	1	Relegation to the 2018 State League 4

(C) Champions; (P) Promoted; (R) Relegated

==== South-East ====
Victorian State League 3 South-East
- Season: 2017
- Champions: Endeavour Hills
- Promoted: Brandon Park; Endeavour Hills
- Relegated: Riversdale; Sandringham

Pos	Team	Pld	W	D	L	GF	GA	GD	Pts	Qualification or relegation
1	Endeavour Hills (C, P)	22	18	3	1	61	12	+49	57	Promotion to the 2018 State League 2
2	Brandon Park (P)	22	15	2	5	66	33	+33	47	Promotion to the 2018 State League 2
3	Monbulk Rangers	22	14	2	6	57	24	+33	44	
4	Skye United	21	14	2	5	56	26	+30	44	
5	South Yarra	22	8	7	7	40	29	+11	31	
6	Brighton SC	22	8	5	9	38	37	+1	29	
7	Noble Park United	22	7	6	9	36	60	−24	27	
8	Collingwood City	22	7	5	10	33	50	−17	26	
9	Middle Park	22	7	2	13	27	43	−16	23	
10	Dingley Stars FC	22	5	5	12	41	56	−15	20	
11	Riversdale (R)	22	3	4	15	29	60	−31	13	Relegation to the 2018 State League 4
12	Sandringham (R)	22	2	5	15	24	78	−54	11	Relegation to the 2018 State League 4

(C) Champions; (P) Promoted; (R) Relegated

=== 2017 Victoria State League 4 ===
==== North ====
Victorian State League 4 North
- Season: 2017
- Champions: Boroondara Eagles Carey
- Promoted: Boroondara Eagles Carey
- Relegated: North City Wolves

Pos	Team	Pld	W	D	L	GF	GA	GD	Pts	Qualification or relegation
1	Boroondara Eagles (C, P)	22	17	2	3	65	15	+50	53	Promotion to the 2018 State League 3
2	Lalor United	22	18	2	2	57	16	+41	50 (Note: Lalor United had six points deducted for misconduct.)	
3	Mill Park SC	22	15	2	5	81	28	+53	44 (Note: Mill Park had three points deducted for misconduct.)	
4	Northern Falcons	22	12	5	5	48	29	+19	41	
5	Marcellin Old Collegians SC	22	10	4	8	51	59	−8	34	
6	RMIT FC	22	9	4	9	29	32	−3	31	
7	Watsonia Heights	22	7	4	11	44	55	−11	25	
8	West Preston	22	7	4	11	42	57	−15	25	
9	Darebin United	21	6	5	10	38	49	−11	23	
10	Greenvale United	21	7	3	11	35	61	−26	24	
11	Brunswick Zebras	22	3	2	17	29	54	−25	11	
12	North City Wolves (R)	22	1	2	19	16	80	−64	5	Relegation to the 2018 State League 5

(C) Champions; (P) Promoted; (R) Relegated

==== West ====
Victorian State League 4 West
- Season: 2017
- Champions: Point Cook
- Promoted: Point Cook; Sebastopol Vikings
- Relegated: Melton Phoenix

Pos	Team	Pld	W	D	L	GF	GA	GD	Pts	Qualification or relegation
1	Point Cook SC (C, P)	22	13	5	4	58	32	+26	44	Promotion to the 2018 State League 3
2	Sebastopol Vikings (P)	22	13	4	5	55	25	+30	43	Promotion to the 2018 State League 3
3	Surf Coast	22	13	3	6	51	29	+22	42	
4	Bell Park	22	12	5	5	37	19	+18	41	
5	North Melbourne Athletic	22	13	2	7	45	38	+7	41	
6	Golden Plains SC	22	8	7	7	34	26	+8	31	
7	Altona North	22	9	4	9	36	49	−13	31	
8	Western Eagles	22	6	7	9	30	43	−13	25	
9	Balmoral FC	22	6	7	9	33	49	−16	25	
10	Truganina Hornets	22	5	4	13	35	45	−10	19	
11	Newmarket Phoenix	22	4	2	16	30	64	−34	14	
12	Melton Phoenix (R)	22	2	6	14	20	45	−25	12	Relegation to the 2018 State League 5

(C) Champions; (P) Promoted; (R) Relegated

==== South ====
Victorian State League 4 South
- Season: 2017
- Champions: Bayside Argonauts
- Promoted: Bayside Argonauts
- Relegated: Knox City

Pos	Team	Pld	W	D	L	GF	GA	GD	Pts	Qualification or relegation
1	Bayside Argonauts (C, P)	22	15	4	3	49	26	+23	49	Promotion to the 2018 State League 3
2	Springvale City	22	14	5	3	55	22	+33	47	
3	Monash University	22	14	4	4	64	29	+35	46	
4	Dandenong South	22	13	6	3	51	33	+18	45	
5	Baxter SC	22	12	2	8	53	45	+8	38	
6	Harrisfield Hurricanes	22	11	4	7	44	43	+1	37	
7	Endeavour United	22	10	6	6	57	38	+19	36	
8	Rosebud Heart	22	8	2	12	46	56	−10	26	
9	Keysborough	22	8	0	14	52	60	−8	24	
10	Noble Park	22	4	3	15	33	56	−23	15	
11	Hampton Park United	22	3	2	17	32	71	−39	11	
12	Knox City (R)	22	1	0	21	17	74	−57	3	Relegation to the 2018 State League 5

(C) Champions; (P) Promoted; (R) Relegated

==== East ====
Victorian State League 4 East
- Season: 2017
- Champions: Whitehorse United
- Promoted: Whitehorse United
- Relegated: Yarra Jets

Pos	Team	Pld	W	D	L	GF	GA	GD	Pts	Qualification or relegation
1	Whitehorse United (C, P)	20	15	1	4	43	15	+28	46	Promotion to the 2018 State League 3
2	Ashburton United	20	12	4	4	54	33	+21	40	
3	Old Xaverians	20	12	3	5	62	31	+31	39	
4	Elwood City	20	12	2	6	47	32	+15	38	
5	Old Camberwell Grammarians	20	11	4	5	50	31	+19	37	
6	Ringwood City	20	8	6	6	30	24	+6	30	
7	Healesville	20	7	6	7	38	32	+6	27	
8	St Kevins Old Boys	20	6	3	11	31	37	−6	21	
9	Croydon City	20	5	3	12	22	48	−26	18	
10	Kings Domain FC	20	3	3	14	22	49	−27	12	
11	Yarra Jets (R)	20	1	1	18	11	78	−67	4	Relegation to the 2018 State League 5

(C) Champions; (P) Promoted; (R) Relegated

=== 2017 Victoria State League 5 ===
==== North ====
Victorian State League 5 North
- Season: 2017
- Champions: Craigieburn City
- Promoted: Craigieburn City; Plenty Valley Lions FC

Pos	Team	Pld	W	D	L	GF	GA	GD	Pts	Qualification or relegation
1	Cragieburn City (C, P)	21	19	1	1	138	18	+120	58	Promotion to the 2018 State League 4
2	Plenty Valley Lions (P)	21	16	3	2	92	34	+58	51	Promotion to the 2018 State League 4
3	Bundoora United	21	16	2	3	80	17	+63	50	
4	Campbellfield Lions	21	11	3	7	54	25	+29	36	
5	Heidelberg Eagles	21	11	2	8	62	45	+17	35	
6	Uni Hill Eagles	21	9	2	10	55	48	+7	29	
7	Mitchell Rangers	21	8	0	13	43	65	−22	24	
8	Meadow Park	21	6	3	12	43	58	−15	21	
9	Keon Park	21	6	3	12	36	65	−29	21	
10	Thornbury Athletic	20	3	0	17	25	130	−105	9	
11	Reservoir Yeti	21	2	0	19	27	128	−101	6	

(C) Champions; (P) Promoted

==== West ====
Victorian State League 5 West
- Season: 2017
- Champions: Laverton Park
- Promoted: Laverton Park; Spring Hills

Pos	Team	Pld	W	D	L	GF	GA	GD	Pts	Qualification or relegation
1	Laverton Park (C, P)	22	17	3	2	69	18	+51	54	Promotion to the 2018 State League 4
2	Spring Hills (P)	22	16	4	2	51	24	+27	52	Promotion to the 2018 State League 4
3	University of Melbourne SC	22	16	1	5	63	29	+34	49	
4	Deakin University SC	22	13	6	3	59	27	+32	45	
5	Lara United	22	10	4	8	54	31	+23	34	
6	Gisborne	22	9	4	9	47	36	+11	31	
7	Maribyrnong Greens	22	8	3	11	37	51	−14	27	
8	Moonee Valley Knights	22	7	5	10	36	39	−3	26	
9	Keilor Woves	22	6	7	9	40	44	−4	25	
10	Melbourne Lions	22	5	3	14	22	56	−34	18	
11	Kyneton District SC	22	2	3	17	18	73	−55	9	
12	Maidstone United	22	1	1	20	11	79	−68	4	

(C) Champions; (P) Promoted

==== South ====
Victorian State League 5 South
- Season: 2017
- Champions: Sandown Lions
- Promoted: Dandenong Warriors; Sandown Lions

Pos	Team	Pld	W	D	L	GF	GA	GD	Pts	Qualification or relegation
1	Sandown Lions (C, P)	22	17	2	3	97	27	+70	53	Promotion to the 2018 State League 4
2	Dandenong Warriors (P)	22	16	3	3	91	28	+63	49 (Note: Dandenong Warriors had two points deducted for misconduct.)	Promotion to the 2018 State League 4
3	Rowville Eagles	21	15	4	2	69	38	+31	49	
4	Chelsea FC	22	13	3	6	59	33	+26	42	
5	Pakenham United	22	9	8	5	42	29	+13	35	
6	Lyndale United	22	10	4	8	56	47	+9	34	
7	Old Mentonians	22	10	2	10	45	46	−1	32	
8	Bunyip District	22	6	4	12	38	63	−25	22	
9	Casey Panthers	22	5	6	11	23	50	−27	21	
10	Somerville Eagles	22	4	4	14	20	61	−41	16	
11	White Star Dandenong	22	3	3	16	22	64	−42	12	
12	Drouin Dragons	22	1	3	18	15	91	−76	6	

(C) Champions; (P) Promoted

==== East ====
Victorian State League 5 East
- Season: 2017
- Champions: East Brighton United
- Promoted: Chisholm United; East Brighton United

Pos	Team	Pld	W	D	L	GF	GA	GD	Pts	Qualification or relegation
1	East Brighton United (C, P)	20	18	0	2	85	10	+75	54	Promotion to the 2018 State League 4
2	Chisholm United (P)	20	14	1	5	59	28	+31	43	Promotion to the 2018 State League 4
3	Monash City	20	14	1	5	55	24	+31	43	
4	Mt Lilydale Old Collegians SC	20	10	2	8	52	51	+1	32	
5	Glen Waverley	20	9	3	8	32	37	−5	30	
6	Old Trinity Grammarians SC	20	6	4	10	35	50	−15	22	
7	Waverley Wanderers	20	6	3	11	39	54	−15	21	
8	Albert Park	20	6	3	11	30	49	−19	21	
9	Old Ivanhoe Grammarians SC	20	6	3	11	30	62	−32	21	
10	East Bentleigh Strikers	20	4	3	13	24	41	−17	15	
11	Swinburne University FC	20	4	3	13	26	61	−35	15	

(C) Champions; (P) Promoted

=== 2017 Women's National Premier League ===
(Victoria (state)) PS4 Women's National Premier League
- Season: 2017
- Champions: South Melbourne
- Premiers: South Melbourne

The highest tier domestic football competition in Victoria for women is known for sponsorship reasons as the PS4 Women's National Premier League. This was the second season of the NPL Women's format. The 10 teams (including newly promoted South Melbourne), played each other 3 times for a total of 27 games.

Pos	Team	Pld	W	D	L	GF	GA	GD	Pts	Qualification or relegation
1	South Melbourne (C)	27	21	4	2	97	33	+64	67	Finals series
2	Calder United	27	21	2	4	81	21	+60	65	Finals series
3	Greater Geelong Galaxy	27	16	6	5	70	36	+34	54	Finals series
4	Alamein FC	27	14	4	9	48	37	+11	46	Finals series
5	Southern United	27	13	3	11	42	42	0	42	
6	Bulleen Lions	27	9	6	12	45	50	−5	33	
7	Box Hill United	27	7	6	14	34	46	−12	27	
8	Victorian Women's NTC	27	5	3	19	39	99	−60	18	
9	Bayside United	27	4	4	19	21	79	−58	16	
10	Heidelberg United	27	3	6	18	19	53	−34	15	

Source: sportstg.com
Rules for classification: 1) points; 2) goal difference; 3) number of goals scored.
(C) Champions

==== Finals ====
Semi-finals
1	South Melbourne (aet)	4
2	Calder United	2
3	Greater Geelong Galaxy	2
4	Alamein FC	0

Preliminary Final
2	Calder United	1
3	Greater Geelong Galaxy	3

Grand Final
1	South Melbourne	3 (5)
3	Greater Geelong Galaxy	3 (4)

=== 2017 Victorian Regional Leagues ===
(For a full list of season honours, see individual Leagues)

League/Association FootballFedVic.com.au/football-other	League 2017	League Cup 2017
Albury Wodonga Football Association	Myrtleford Savoy	AWFA Cup (Final Series); Myrtleford Savoy
Ballarat & District Soccer Association	Sebastopol Vikings SC	?
Bendigo Amateur Soccer League	Eaglehawk SC	?
Football Federation Victoria Geelong Region	Barwon SC Red	Geelong Community Soccer Cup; Corio SC
Gippsland Soccer League	Phillip Island SC	?
Goulburn North East Football Association	?	?
Moama-Echuca Soccer Association	?	?
Football Federation Victoria Sunraysia	?	?
Swan Hill Soccer League	?	?
Warrnambool & District Soccer League	Warrnambool Wolves	Warrnambool Rangers

== Cup Competitions ==
=== 2017 Dockerty Cup ===
Football Victoria soccer clubs competed in 2017 for the Dockerty Cup. The tournament doubled as the Victorian qualifiers for the 2017 FFA Cup, with the top four clubs progressing to the Round of 32. A total of 217 clubs entered the qualifying phase, with the clubs entering in a staggered format.

The Cup was won by Heidelberg United.

In addition to the two A-League clubs (Melbourne Victory and Melbourne City), the four semi-finalists (Bentleigh Greens, Heidelberg United, Hume City and South Melbourne) competed in the final rounds of the 2017 FFA Cup.
