= Francesca Iermano =

Australian soccer player

Personal information
- Full name: Francesca Iermano
- Date of birth: April 21, 2000 (age 26)
- Place of birth: Australia
- Position: Defender

Team information
- Current team: South Melbourne

Youth career
- Essendon Royals

Senior career*
Years	Team	Apps	(Gls)
2016–2018	FV Emerging	64	(5)
2019	Bulleen Lions	28	(2)
2021	FV Emerging	12	(2)
2021–2022	Melbourne Victory	3	(0)
2022	South Melbourne	21	(5)
2022–2023	Western United	9	(0)
2023–	South Melbourne	60	(5)
- * Club domestic league appearances and goals

Francesca Iermano (Italian: [franˌtʃɛska jerˈmaːno]; born 21 April 2000) is an Australian soccer player who plays as a defender and is captain of South Melbourne, competing in the who has played in the NPL Victoria Women competition. Iermano competed professionally in the Liberty A‑League Women with Melbourne Victory and Western United. A versatile player, she has been deployed across defence, midfield and attack.

== Early life ==
Iermano played junior football with Essendon Royals, stepping into under‑18 competition at age 13, before progressing through Victoria’s pathways including the National Training Centre and Emerging programs, with later stints at Bulleen Lions and FV Emerging.

== Club career ==
=== Melbourne Victory ===
In January 2022, Iermano joined Melbourne Victory as an injury‑replacement player, making three Liberty A‑League appearances in the 2021–22 season.

=== Western United ===
On 30 August 2022, Iermano signed with Western United for the club’s inaugural 2022–23 Liberty A‑League season, noted for her versatility across positions. She started Western United’s first ever ALW match and made nine league appearances as the team reached the Grand Final in its debut campaign. She is listed by ESPN as a defender during her Western United tenure.

=== South Melbourne ===
Alongside and after her ALW stints, Iermano has played in NPL Victoria Women with South Melbourne. She scored in the opening round of the 2024 NPLW Victoria season against Bentleigh. South Melbourne announced Iermano as club captain for the 2025 season.
