= Danella Butrus =

Iraqi Australian soccer player (born 2007)

Personal information
- Full name: Danella Khalid Butrus
- Date of birth: 13 February 2007 (age 19)
- Place of birth: Duhok, Iraq
- Position: Midfielder

Youth career
- –2024: Roxburgh Park FC

Senior career*
Years	Team	Apps	(Gls)
2023–2025	FV Emerging	29	(8)
2025–	Bulleen Lions	22	(11)
2025–2026	Melbourne City	15	(0)

International career^{‡}
2024	Australia U17		
2025–	Australia U20	4	(1)
- * Club domestic league appearances and goals as of 16 October 2026 ‡ National team caps and goals as of 14 April 2026

Danella Khalid Butrus (Note: Syriac: ܕܢܝܠܐ ܚܐܠܕ ܒܛܪܘܣ, [daˈniːla ħɑːld bˤtˤruːs]; Arabic: دانيلا خالد بطرس, [daːˈniː.la ˈxaː.lɪd ˈbu.tˤrʊs]) (born 13 February 2007) is a soccer player who played as a midfielder for A-League Women club Melbourne City. Born in Iraq, she plays for the Australia under-20 national team. She is regarded as a rising star in Australian women's soccer.

== Early life ==
Butrus was born in the city of Duhok in the Kurdistan Region of Iraq on 13 February 2007, in an Assyrian family. She fled Iraq with her family due to regional armed conflict, first settling in Syria and then continuing to Australia in 2013. She arrived in Australia with limited knowledge of the English language and learnt English as a second language at school.

Butrus attended Wallan Secondary College in the town of Wallan, Victoria, located 45 km (28 mi) north of Melbourne CBD. She played soccer as a forward for Roxburgh Park United, in the Victorian State League (Division 5 North) during her youth years (fl. 2021), where she was described as a promising young talent. At the club, she was surrounded by fellow Iraqi teammates, though most of them were unable to pursue a career in soccer due to persistent misogynistic views on women in sport in Iraqi culture.

== Club career ==
=== FV Emerging ===
Butrus began her senior career at National Premier Leagues Victoria Women club (NPL Victoria Women) FV Emerging in 2023.

Butrus secured a move to Bulleen Lions following a standout season at FV Emerging in 2024, in which she made 29 appearances and scored eight goals.

=== Bulleen Lions ===
Staying in the National Premier Leagues Victoria Women (NPL Victoria Women) Butrus signed for Bulleen Lions ahead of the 2025 season.

On 8 January, Butrus scored in the FV Women's Community Shield, which Bulleen Lions lifted following a 4–2 win over Heidelberg United at The Home of the Matildas in Melbourne. On 30 August, she scored her first hat-trick of her career, scoring three goals in an 8–0 win over Brunswick Juventus in round 22.

At the end of the season, Butrus had played 22 matches and scored 11 goals. Her standout season saw her win the NPLW Gold Medal (which she shared with Spring Hills FC's Aleks Sinclair), NPLW Media Player of the Year and NPLW Goal of the Year (for her bicycle kick against Boroondara Eagles) at the end of season awards ceremony. Having received 27 votes, Butrus became the first teenager to win the NPLW Gold Medal since Mindy Barbieri in 2018.

=== Melbourne City ===
Butrus signed for Melbourne City ahead of the 2025–26 A-League Women season, signing alongside five other young players (Ayana Aoyagi, Dani Gorr Burchmore, Kaya Jugović, Izabella Rako and Keira Sarris). She debuted for Melbourne City in the opening round of the season on 1 November 2025, coming on as a substitute in the 87th minute of a 2–2 draw away to Sydney FC. On 14 November 2025, Butrus scored her first professional goal, having scored from a tight angle in a 5–0 win over Singaporean Women's Premier League (SWPL) side Lion City Sailors in the group stage of the AFC Women's Champions League (AWCL), before scoring again in Melbourne City's 7–0 win over PFF Women's League side Stallion Laguna.

In December 2025, following standout performances in her first five games at the club, Butrus extended her contract with Melbourne City through to 2027. She was particularly impactful in the club's three Champions League group stage matches in Vietnam, providing two goals and three assists, as well as performing an impressive rainbow flick.

In October 2026, Butrus departed the club as she stepped away from football for personal reasons.

== State career ==
Butrus was selected to play for Victoria at the 2023 Emerging Matildas Championships in Wollongong, New South Wales. In Pool A, she scored goals in two consecutive matches against Queensland and the Australian Capital Territory, before scoring a glut (five goals) against Western Australia. She then scored once again in the semi-final against South Australia which sent Victoria to the final, where they were defeated by hosts New South Wales Metro at Wollongong Showground.

== International career ==
Butrus has represented Australia for the under-17s (Junior Matildas), and has been called for the under-20s (Young Matildas).

Butrus was part of Rae Dower's 23-player squad at the 2024 AFC U-17 Women's Asian Cup. The tournament was seen as a failure for the Junior Matildas, which finished last in their Group B.

Butrus was named for the Young Matildas in Alex Epakis' squad for a two-game friendly series against South Korea at the Australian Institute of Sport (AIS) in Canberra on 28 and 30 November 2025. However, she withdrew from the squad alongside Western Sydney Wanderers midfielder Talia Younis due to both having injuries.

Butrus was selected by Epakis as part of Australia's 23-player squad for the 2026 AFC U-20 Women's Asian Cup in Thailand.

== Personal life ==
Butrus is of Assyrian descent and is a Syriac Christian.
