= 2021–22 Adelaide United FC (women) season =

14th season in existence of Adelaide United (women)

Adelaide United (women)
2021–22 season
- Chairman: Piet van der Pol
- Head Coach: Adrian Stenta
- Stadium: Marden Sports Complex; Coopers Stadium
- W-League: 3rd
- W-League Finals: Semi-finals
- Top goalscorer: League: Fiona Worts (13); All: Fiona Worts (13)
- Highest home attendance: 2,607 vs. Melbourne Victory (26 February 2022); A-League Women Finals
- Lowest home attendance: 780 vs. Canberra United (12 December 2021); A-League Women
- Average home league attendance: 1,593
- Biggest win: 8–2 vs. Brisbane Roar (A) (13 February 2022); A-League Women
- Biggest defeat: 1–5 vs. Melbourne Victory (A) (5 December 2021); A-League Women

The 2021–22 season was Adelaide United Football Club (women)'s 14th season in the A-League Women. Adelaide United finished 3rd in their A-League Women season.

== Players ==
Note: Flags indicate national team as defined under FIFA eligibility rules; some limited exceptions apply. Players may hold more than one non-FIFA nationality.

No.	Pos.	Nation	Player
1	GK	AUS	Annalee Grove
2	DF	AUS	Emily Hodgson
3	DF	AUS	Matilda McNamara
4	DF	USA	Katie Sharples
5	DF	AUS	Emma Stanbury
6	MF	JPN	Reona Omiya
7	MF	AUS	Natasha Brough
8	MF	AUS	Emily Condon
9	DF	AUS	Paige Hayward
10	FW	AUS	Chelsie Dawber
11	DF	AUS	Isabel Hodgson

No.	Pos.	Nation	Player
12	MF	JPN	Nanako Sasaki
13	DF	AUS	Ella Tonkin
15	FW	AUS	Meleri Mullan
16	MF	AUS	Dylan Holmes
17	FW	AUS	Shadeene Evans
18	FW	AUS	Georgia Beaumont
19	DF	AUS	Leia Varley
20	GK	AUS	Miranda Templeman
21	DF	AUS	Grace Taranto
22	FW	AUS	Emilia Murray
23	FW	ENG	Fiona Worts

== Transfers and contracts ==
=== Transfers in ===
No.	Position	Player	Transferred from	Type/fee	Date	Ref.
20	GK	Miranda Templeman	(Australia) FNSW Institute	Free transfer	18 August 2021	
9	DF	Paige Hayward	(Austria) FFC Vorderland	Free transfer	19 August 2021	
7	MF	Natasha Brough	(Netherlands) Alkmaar	Free transfer	30 September 2021	
18	FW	Georgia Beaumont	(Australia) Moreton Bay United	Free transfer	30 September 2021	
6	MF	(Japan) Reona Omiya	(Australia) South Melbourne	Free transfer	1 October 2021	
17	FW	Shadeene Evans	(Australia) Northern Tigers	Free transfer	8 October 2021	
5	DF	Emma Stanbury	(Australia) West Canberra Wanderers	Free transfer	11 November 2021	
12	MF	(Japan) Nanako Sasaki	(Australia) Adelaide Comets	Free transfer	11 November 2021	
19	DF	Leia Varley	(Australia) FV Emerging	Free transfer	15 November 2021	
21	DF	Grace Taranto	(Australia) Bulleen Lions	Free transfer	15 November 2021	
4	DF	(United States) Kayla Sharples	(United States) Chicago Red Stars	Loan	1 December 2021	
22	FW	Emilia Murray	(Australia) FSA NTC	Free transfer	3 December 2021	
26	GK	Grace Wilson	(Australia) FSA NTC	Free transfer	3 December 2021	
16	MF	Dylan Holmes	(Sweden) Häcken	Free transfer	15 December 2021	

=== Transfers out ===
No.	Position	Player	Transferred to	Type/fee	Date	Ref.
4	DF	(United States) Mallory Weber	(United States) Kansas City	Free transfer	31 March 2021	
5	DF	Charlotte Grant	(Sweden) Rosengård	Free transfer	6 April 2021	
21	MF	Lara Kirkby	(United States) Oregon Ducks	Free transfer	6 May 2021	
19	DF	(Netherlands) Maruschka Waldus	(Netherlands) PSV	Free transfer	10 May 2021	
22	GK	Inana Toovey	(Australia) Adelaide Comets	Free transfer	22 July 2021	
14	MF	Abbey Burns	(Australia) FFSA NTC	Free transfer	22 July 2021	
7	FW	(Chile) María José Rojas	Sydney FC	Free transfer	6 September 2021	
11	DF	Laura Johns	(Australia) West Adelaide	Free transfer	17 November 2021	
1	GK	Sian Fryer-McLaren	Unattached	Free transfer	2 December 2021	
6	MF	Georgia Campagnale	Unattached	Free transfer	2 December 2021	
17	DF	Kahlia Hogg	Unattached	Free transfer	2 December 2021	

=== Contract extensions ===
No.	Position	Player	Duration	Date	Ref.
2	DF	Emily Hodgson	2 years	4 August 2021	
3	DF	Matilda McNamara	2 years	4 August 2021	
10	FW	Chelsie Dawber	1 year	5 August 2021	
11	DF	Isabel Hodgson	1 year	5 August 2021	
13	DF	Ella Tonkin	1 year	6 August 2021	
15	FW	Meleri Mullan	1 year	6 August 2021	
1	GK	Annalee Grove	1 year	18 August 2021	
8	MF	Emily Condon	2 years	18 August 2021	
23	FW	Fiona Worts	1 year	25 October 2021	

== Competitions ==
=== Overall record ===
Competition	First match	Last match	Starting round	Final position	Record							
Competition	First match	Last match	Starting round	Final position	Pld	W	D	L	GF	GA	GD	Win %
A-League Women	5 December 2021	6 March 2022	Matchday 1	3rd	14	9	0	5	33	18	+15	64.29
A-League Women Finals	13 March 2022		Semi-finals	Semi-finals	1	0	0	1	0	1	−1	0.00
Total					15	9	0	6	33	19	+14	60.00

Source: Competitions

=== A-League Women ===
==== League table ====
Pos	Team	Pld	W	D	L	GF	GA	GD	Pts	Qualification
1	Sydney FC	14	11	2	1	36	6	+30	35	Qualification to Finals series
2	Melbourne City	14	11	0	3	29	11	+18	33	Qualification to Finals series
3	Adelaide United	14	9	0	5	33	18	+15	27	Qualification to Finals series
4	Melbourne Victory (C)	14	7	3	4	26	22	+4	24	Qualification to Finals series
5	Perth Glory	14	7	3	4	20	23	−3	24	
6	Brisbane Roar	14	5	2	7	29	30	−1	17	
7	Canberra United	14	2	7	5	24	29	−5	13	
8	Newcastle Jets	14	2	4	8	15	30	−15	10	
9	Western Sydney Wanderers	14	1	4	9	7	27	−20	7	
10	Wellington Phoenix	14	2	1	11	13	36	−23	7	

Source: A-Leagues
Rules for classification: 1) points; 2) goal difference; 3) number of goals scored.
(C) Champions

==== Results summary ====
Overall								Home						Away					
Pld	W	D	L	GF	GA	GD	Pts	W	D	L	GF	GA	GD	W	D	L	GF	GA	GD
14	9	0	5	33	18	+15	27	5	0	2	13	5	+8	4	0	3	20	13	+7

Source: worldfootball.net

==== Results by round ====
Round	1	2	3	4	6	7	8	9	10	5	11	12	13	14
Ground	A	H	A	H	A	H	H	A	H	A	A	A	H	H
Result	L	W	L	W	W	L	W	W	W	L	W	W	W	L
Position	10	6	6	6	4	4	4	3	3	3	3	3	2	3
Points	0	3	3	6	9	9	12	15	18	18	21	24	27	27

Source: A-Leagues
A = Away; H = Home; W = Win; D = Draw; L = Loss

==== Matches ====
The first four rounds of the league fixtures were announced on 23 September 2021. The rest of the league fixtures were announced on 9 November 2021.

Win Draw Loss

5 December 2021 1	Melbourne Victory	5–1	Adelaide United	Melbourne
16:05 AEDT	Privitelli 10', 69'; Morrison 19'; Bunge 23'; Zimmerman 39'	Report	Worts 64'	Stadium: AAMI Park; Attendance: 3,450; Referee: Isabella Blaess

12 December 2021 2	Adelaide United	2–1	Canberra United	Adelaide
17:35 ACDT	Sasaki 23'; Condon 90+1'	Report	Heyman 16'	Stadium: Marden Sports Complex; Attendance: 780; Referee: Rebecca Mackie

18 December 2021 3	Melbourne City	3–1	Adelaide United	Melbourne
17:05 AEDT	Pollicina 38'; Wilkinson 40', 90+4'	Report	Dawber 65'	Stadium: AAMI Park; Attendance: 7,896; Referee: Rachael Mitchenson

1 January 2022 4	Adelaide United	4–2	Perth Glory	Adelaide
16:35 ACDT	Dawber 33', 47'; Condon 81'; McNamara 77'	Report	Hintzen 41'; Jancevski 53' (pen.)	Stadium: Coopers Stadium; Attendance: 1,660; Referee: Rebecca Mackie
Note: Match originally scheduled for 23 December at Marden Sports Complex, but rescheduled for 1 January at Coopers Stadium due border restrictions affected by the COVID-19 pandemic in Western Australia.

8 January 2022 6	Canberra United	1–3	Adelaide United	Canberra
17:05 AEDT	Sykes 57'	Report	Holmes 9'; Dawber 40'; Worts 77'	Stadium: McKellar Park; Attendance: 910; Referee: Kate Jacewicz

15 January 2022 7	Adelaide United	0–1	Melbourne City	Adelaide
16:35 ACDT		Report	Pollicina 66'	Stadium: Coopers Stadium; Attendance: 2,062; Referee: Georgia Ghirardello

21 January 2022 8	Adelaide United	1–0	Wellington Phoenix	Adelaide
18:05 ACDT	McMeeken 68' (o.g.)	Report		Stadium: Coopers Stadium; Attendance: 1,024; Referee: Caitlin Williams

28 January 2022 9	Western Sydney Wanderers	0–3	Adelaide United	Sydney
19:45 AEDT		Report	Sharples 5'; Worts 55', 87'	Stadium: Marconi Stadium; Attendance: 515; Referee: Isabella Blaess

6 February 2022 10	Adelaide United	3–0	Newcastle Jets	Adelaide
15:35 ACDT	Worts 24', 76'; Dawber 80' (pen.)	Report		Stadium: Coopers Stadium; Attendance: 2,032; Referee: Rebecca Mackie
Note: Match originally set to take place at Marden Sports Complex, but changed to take place at Coopers Stadium.

10 February 2022 5	Perth Glory	1–0	Adelaide United	Gosford
14:05 AEDT	Leth Jans 6'	Report		Stadium: Central Coast Stadium; Attendance: 308; Referee: Georgia Ghirardello
Note: Match originally scheduled for 2 January, but rescheduled for 2 March at Macedonia Park due border restrictions affected by the COVID-19 pandemic in Western Australia. Match then again rescheduled for 10 February at Central Coast Stadium.

13 February 2022 11	Brisbane Roar	2–8	Adelaide United	Brisbane
15:05 AEST	Connors 59', 80'	Report	Dawber 13'; Palmer 23' (o.g.); Worts 33', 43', 57', 64', 74'; McNamara 55'	Stadium: Moreton Daily Stadium; Attendance: 1,000; Referee: Rachael Mitchenson

18 February 2022 12	Wellington Phoenix	1–4	Adelaide United	Wollongong
16:35 NZDT	Jale 25'	Report	Dawber 5', 59'; McMeeken 34' (o.g.); Worts 55'	Stadium: WIN Stadium; Referee: Kelly Jones
Note: Match originally scheduled for 19 February at 16:35 NZDT, but rescheduled for 18 February at 18:05 NZDT.

26 February 2022 13	Adelaide United	3–0	Melbourne Victory	Adelaide
16:35 ACDT	Worts 18', 25', 46'	Report		Stadium: Coopers Stadium; Attendance: 2,421; Referee: Lara Lee

6 March 2022 14	Adelaide United	0–1	Sydney FC	Adelaide
15:35 ACDT		Report	Satchell 61'	Stadium: Coopers Stadium; Attendance: 1,173; Referee: Casey Reibelt

==== Finals series ====
13 March 2022 Semi-finals	Adelaide United	1–2	Melbourne Victory	Adelaide
15:35 ACDT	Sasaki 32'	Report	Privitelli 29'; Ayres 57'	Stadium: Coopers Stadium; Attendance: 2,607; Referee: Lara Lee

== Statistics ==
=== Appearances and goals ===
Includes all competitions. Players with no appearances not included in the list.

No.	Pos	Nat	Player	Total		A-League Women		A-League Women Finals	
No.	Pos	Nat	Player	Apps	Goals	Apps	Goals	Apps	Goals
1	GK	(Australia) AUS	Annalee Grove	15	0	14	0	1	0
2	DF	(Australia) AUS	Emily Hodgson	15	0	14	0	1	0
3	DF	(Australia) AUS	Matilda McNamara	15	2	14	2	1	0
4	DF	(United States) USA	Kayla Sharples	12	1	11	1	1	0
5	DF	(Australia) AUS	Emma Stanbury	12	0	4+7	0	0+1	0
6	MF	(Japan) JPN	Reona Omiya	15	0	5+9	0	1	0
7	MF	(Australia) AUS	Natasha Brough	1	0	0+1	0	0	0
8	MF	(Australia) AUS	Emily Condon	12	2	11	2	1	0
9	DF	(Australia) AUS	Paige Hayward	10	0	10	0	0	0
10	FW	(Australia) AUS	Chelsie Dawber	15	10	13+1	10	1	0
11	DF	(Australia) AUS	Isabel Hodgson	13	0	12	0	1	0
12	MF	(Japan) JPN	Nanako Sasaki	14	2	12+1	1	1	1
13	DF	(Australia) AUS	Ella Tonkin	9	0	5+4	0	0	0
15	FW	(Australia) AUS	Meleri Mullan	5	0	0+4	0	0+1	0
16	MF	(Australia) AUS	Dylan Holmes	12	1	11	1	1	0
17	FW	(Australia) AUS	Shadeene Evans	7	0	3+3	0	0+1	0
18	FW	(Australia) AUS	Georgia Beaumont	8	0	1+7	0	0	0
19	DF	(Australia) AUS	Leia Varley	5	0	0+5	0	0	0
20	GK	(Australia) AUS	Miranda Templeman	1	0	0+1	0	0	0
21	DF	(Australia) AUS	Grace Taranto	2	0	0+2	0	0	0
22	FW	(Australia) AUS	Emilia Murray	10	0	0+10	0	0	0
23	FW	(England) ENG	Fiona Worts	15	0	14	0	1	0

- Source: Soccerway

=== Disciplinary record ===
Includes all competitions. The list is sorted by squad number when total cards are equal. Players with no cards not included in the list.

No.	Pos	Nat	Player	Total			A-League Women			A-League Women Finals		
No.	Pos	Nat	Player	Yellow card	Second yellow card	Red card	Yellow card	Second yellow card	Red card	Yellow card	Second yellow card	Red card
12	MF	(Japan) JPN	Nanako Sasaki	4	0	0	4	0	0	0	0	0
5	DF	(Australia) AUS	Emma Stanbury	3	0	0	3	0	0	0	0	0
11	DF	(Australia) AUS	Isabel Hodgson	3	0	0	3	0	0	0	0	0
16	MF	(Australia) AUS	Dylan Holmes	2	0	0	1	0	0	1	0	0
2	DF	(Australia) AUS	Emily Hodgson	1	0	0	1	0	0	0	0	0
3	DF	(Australia) AUS	Matilda McNamara	1	0	0	1	0	0	0	0	0
4	DF	(United States) USA	Kayla Sharples	1	0	0	1	0	0	0	0	0
9	DF	(Australia) AUS	Paige Hayward	1	0	0	1	0	0	0	0	0
17	FW	(Australia) AUS	Shadeene Evans	1	0	0	1	0	0	0	0	0
18	FW	(Australia) AUS	Georgia Beaumont	1	0	0	1	0	0	0	0	0
23	FW	(England) ENG	Fiona Worts	1	0	0	1	0	0	0	0	0

- Source: Soccerway
- (yellow card) = Number of bookings; (second yellow card) = Number of sending offs after a second yellow card; (red card) = Number of sending offs by a direct red card.
