= Leia Varley =

Australian soccer player (born 2002)

Personal information
- Date of birth: 30 January 2002 (age 24)
- Place of birth: Finley, New South Wales, Australia
- Height: 1.84 m (6 ft 0 in)
- Position: Defender

Team information
- Current team: 1. FC Nürnberg
- Number: 7

Youth career
- Goulburn Valley Suns
- 2016–2017: Football Victoria NTC
- 2018: Box Hill United
- 2019: South Melbourne
- 2021–2022: Football Victoria NTC
- 2022–2023: Newcastle Jets

Senior career*
Years	Team	Apps	(Gls)
2021–2022	Adelaide United	5	(0)
2023	South Melbourne		
2023–2024	Melbourne City	5	(0)
2024–2026	Brisbane Roar	30	(1)
2026–	1. FC Nürnberg	19	(0)
- * Club domestic league appearances and goals as of 21:14, 18 November 2026 (UTC)

Leia Varley (/ˈliː.ə/ LEE-ə; born 30 January 2002) is an Australian soccer player who plays as a centre back for Frauen-Bundesliga club 1. FC Nürnberg. She previously played for National Premier Leagues Victoria Women (NPL Victoria Women) club South Melbourne and A-League Women clubs Adelaide United, Melbourne City and Brisbane Roar.

== Early life ==
Varley was born on 30 January 2002 in the town of Finley, New South Wales, and grew up in Shepparton, Victoria. In her youth years, she played for Goulburn Valley Suns, Football Victoria NTC (over two stints), Box Hill United and South Melbourne.

== Club career ==
=== Adelaide United ===
Varley signed for A-League Women club Adelaide United ahead of the 2021–22 season. She made her debut on 5 December 2021, coming on as a substitute in a 5–1 away Original Rivalry loss to Melbourne Victory at Melbourne Rectangular Stadium in East Melbourne in the opening round. She was released by the club at the end of the season.

=== South Melbourne ===
Varley signed for National Premier Leagues Victoria Women (NPL Victoria Women) club South Melbourne ahead of the 2023 season.

=== Melbourne City ===
Varley signed for A-League Women club Melbourne City ahead of the 2023–24 season, signing on a one-year scholarship deal. She made her debut on 9 December 2023, starting in a 3–1 home loss to Perth Glory at B.T. Connor Reserve in Reservoir. At the end of the season, the club won the premiership (having finished first on the league table), but did not win the championship (as they lost the grand final 1–0 at home to Sydney FC). She departed the club at the end of the season following the expiration of her contract.

=== Brisbane Roar ===
Varley signed for A-League Women club Brisbane Roar ahead of the 2024–25 season. She made her debut on 2 November 2024, starting in a 3–2 away loss to Canberra United at McKellar Park in McKellar, Canberra in the opening round. She scored her first goal on 29 December 2024, scoring the Roar's fourth goal in an 8–2 away win over Western United at Ironbark Fields in Tarneit, Melbourne. During the season, she extended her contract with the club until 2027.

During the 2025–26 season, Varley left Brisbane Roar midseason to move to Germany to join Frauen-Bundesliga club 1. FC Nürnberg.

=== 1. FC Nürnberg ===
Varley signed for Frauen-Bundesliga club 1. FC Nürnberg during the 2025–26 season as a Deadline Day signing in the winter transfer window.

== Personal life ==
Varley is known for her height, being 184 centimetres (six feet) tall, much higher than the average female height.
