= 2022 Football Victoria season =

Football Victoria
- Season: 2022
- Dates: 20 February - 18 September 2022
- Champions: Oakleigh Cannons
- Premiers: South Melbourne
- Dockety Cup Champion: Bentleigh Greens

The 2022 season is the 111th season of competitive association football in Victoria. The Premier of the top tier of Victorian football was South Melbourne and the Champions being Oakleigh Cannons.

== League Tables ==
=== 2022 National Premier Leagues Victoria ===
National Premier Leagues Victoria
- Season: 2022
- Champions: Oakleigh Cannons
- Premiers: South Melbourne
- Relegated: Dandenong City; Eastern Lions
- Matches: 182
- Goals: 544 (2.99 per match)
- All statistics correct as of 12 August 2024.

South Melbourne were premiers and Oakleigh Cannons became champions after beating South Melbourne 5-0.

==== Regular season ====
Pos	Team	Pld	W	D	L	GF	GA	GD	Pts	Qualification or relegation
1	South Melbourne	26	20	2	4	59	20	+39	62	2022 NPL Victoria Finals
2	Port Melbourne	26	17	5	4	45	23	+22	56	2022 NPL Victoria Finals
3	Oakleigh Cannons	26	16	3	7	58	29	+29	51	2022 NPL Victoria Finals
4	Green Gully	26	14	3	9	43	30	+13	45	2022 NPL Victoria Finals
5	Bentleigh Greens	26	12	6	8	47	33	+14	42	2022 NPL Victoria Finals
6	Heidelberg United	26	13	3	10	50	43	+7	42	2022 NPL Victoria Finals
7	Avondale	26	12	4	10	49	38	+11	40	
8	Dandenong Thunder	26	11	5	10	37	34	+3	38	
9	Melbourne Knights	26	9	3	14	36	40	−4	30	
10	St Albans Saints	26	8	6	12	25	38	−13	30	
11	Altona Magic	26	8	3	15	21	38	−17	27	
12	Hume City	26	7	5	14	33	48	−15	26	
13	Dandenong City (R)	26	5	5	16	24	60	−36	20	Relegation to the 2023 NPL Victoria 2
14	Eastern Lions (R)	26	1	5	20	17	70	−53	8	Relegation to the 2023 NPL Victoria 2

Source: mygameday
Rules for classification: 1) points; 2) goal difference; 3) number of goals scored.
(R) Relegated

==== Finals Series ====
Oakleigh Cannons would beat South Melbourne 5-0 at Olympic Park in Heidelberg West.

Elimination finals
4	Green Gully	2
5	Bentleigh Greens	0
3	Oakleigh Cannons	3 (3)
6	Heidelberg United	3 (1)

Preliminary finals
1	South Melbourne	1
4	Green Gully	0
2	Port Melbourne	1
3	Oakleigh Cannons (a.e.t.)	2

Grand final
1	South Melbourne	0
3	Oakleigh Cannons	5

=== 2022 National Premier Leagues Victoria 2 ===
NPL Victoria 2
- Season: 2022
- Champions: Moreland City
- Promoted: Moreland City; North Geelong Warriors
- Relegated: Goulburn Valley Suns
- Matches: 132
- Goals: 445 (3.37 per match)

Moreland City Was crowned NPL Victoria 2 Champion and gained promotion alongside North Geelong Warriors. Kingston city and Goulburn Valley Suns would play in the pro/rel play-offs.

Pos	Team	Pld	W	D	L	GF	GA	GD	Pts	Promotion, qualification or relegation
1	Moreland City (C, P)	22	15	4	3	48	27	+21	49	Promotion to the NPL Victoria
2	North Geelong Warriors (P)	22	15	3	4	51	23	+28	48	Promotion to the NPL Victoria
3	Pascoe Vale	22	14	2	6	51	22	+29	44	
4	Brunswick Juventus	22	13	5	4	47	25	+22	44	
5	Bulleen Lions	22	9	6	7	42	26	+16	33	
6	Northcote City	22	10	3	9	40	46	−6	33	
7	Langwarrin SC	22	6	9	7	33	35	−2	27	
8	Manningham United Blues	22	6	6	10	29	34	−5	24	
9	Brunswick City	22	5	7	10	31	47	−16	22	
10	Werribee City	22	7	0	15	24	44	−20	21	
11	Kingston City	22	5	5	12	30	48	−18	20	Relegation to NPL Victoria 3 play-offs
12	Goulburn Valley Suns (R)	22	0	4	18	19	68	−49	4	Relegation to NPL Victoria 3 play-offs

Rules for classification: 1) Points; 2) Goal difference; 3) Goals scored
(C) Champions; (P) Promoted; (R) Relegated

=== 2022 National Premier Leagues Victoria 3 ===
NPL Victoria 3
- Season: 2022
- Dates: 19 March – 20 August 2022
- Champions: Preston Lions
- Promoted: Preston Lions; Melbourne City Youth; Western United Youth
- Relegated: Whittlesesa Ranges; Springvale White Eagles
- Matches: 132
- Goals: 441 (3.34 per match)
- Top goalscorer: Archibald Macphee (14); Connor Bell
- Biggest home win: Melbourne Victory Youth 6-0; Ballarat City (7 May 2022)
- Biggest away win: Ballarat City 0-5; Melbourne City Youth (25 June 2022)
- All statistics correct as of 11 August 2024.

Preston Lions Was crowned NPL Victoria 3 Champion and gained promotion alongside Melbourne City Youth. Western United Youth and Melbourne Victory Youth would qualify for the NPL Victoria 2 promotion play-offs.

Pos	Team	Pld	W	D	L	GF	GA	GD	Pts	Promotion, qualification or relegation
1	Preston Lions (C, P)	22	16	4	2	43	13	+30	52	Promotion to the NPL Victoria 2
2	Melbourne City Youth (P)	22	15	4	3	57	22	+35	49	Promotion to the NPL Victoria 2
3	Western United Youth (O, P)	22	12	3	7	44	32	+12	39	Qualification for NPL Victoria 2 play-offs
4	Melbourne Victory Youth	22	11	5	6	38	27	+11	38	Qualification for NPL Victoria 2 play-offs
5	Nunawading City	22	11	3	8	34	27	+7	36	
6	North Sunshine Eagles	22	9	3	10	39	37	+2	30	
7	Doveton SC	22	7	8	7	32	30	+2	29	
8	Geelong SC	22	8	3	11	28	38	−10	27	
9	Box Hill United	22	6	7	9	34	36	−2	25	
10	Ballarat City	22	5	4	13	31	61	−30	19	
11	Springvale White Eagles (R)	22	6	1	15	35	60	−25	19	Relegation to Victorian State League Division 1
12	Whittlesea Ranges (R)	22	1	5	16	26	58	−32	8	Relegation to Victorian State League Division 1

Source: sportstg.com
Rules for classification: 1) Points; 2) Goal difference; 3) Goals scored
(C) Champions; (O) Play-off winners; (P) Promoted; (R) Relegated

=== NPL Victoria 2/3 Play-offs ===
In the 2022 season the bottem two teams in the NPL Victoria 2 and the 3rd to 4th placed teams in NPL Victoria 3 played in a play-off competition where 2 games would be played and the winners would play in NPL Victoria 2 in the 2023 Season, while the looser would play in the NPL Victoria 3 for the 2023 season.

27 August 2022 Play-Off	Goulburn Valley Suns	1-6	Western United Youth	Broadmeadows, Victoria
2:00pm AEST	Balaburov		Holmes; Najdovski; Botic; Theoharous; Duzel	Stadium: Hume City Stadium; Referee: Ross Clark

28 August 2022 Play-Off	Kingston City	1-0	Melbourne Victory Youth	Broadmeadows, Victoria
2:00pm AEST	Sakhizada			Stadium: Hume City Stadium; Referee: Michael Mammis

== Women's football ==
=== 2022 National Premier Leagues Victoria Women ===
==== Regular season ====
National Premier Leagues Victoria Women
- Season: 2022
- Champions: Calder United
- Premiers: Calder United
- Matches: 84
- Goals: 294 (3.5 per match)
- All statistics correct as of 12 August 2024.

Calder United Would be crowned NPL Victoria Women's Premier's.

Pos	Team	Pld	W	D	L	GF	GA	GD	Pts	Promotion, qualification or relegation
1	Calder United	21	16	3	2	52	7	+45	51	Quallification to the NPL Victoria Women's Finals Series
2	Heidelberg United	21	16	0	5	51	22	+29	48	Quallification to the NPL Victoria Women's Finals Series
3	Bulleen Lions	21	9	5	7	42	30	+12	32	Quallification to the NPL Victoria Women's Finals Series
4	FV Emerging	21	10	2	9	36	39	−3	32	Quallification to the NPL Victoria Women's Finals Series
5	Alamein FC	21	8	5	8	32	26	+6	29	
6	South Melbourne	21	6	4	11	38	51	−13	22	
7	Box Hill United	21	5	5	11	28	38	−10	20	
8	Bayside United	21	1	2	18	15	81	−66	5	

Rules for classification: 1) Points; 2) Goal difference; 3) Goals scored

==== Finals Series ====
Calder United would beat Bulleen Lions 2-0 in the NPL Victoria Women's Grand Final.

Semifinals
3 September - David Barro Stadium
1	Calder United	1
4	FV Emerging	0
3 September - Olympic Park
2	Heidelberg United	0
3	Bulleen Lions (a.e.t.)	1

Final
11 September - Olympic Park
1	Calder United	2
3	Bulleen Lions	0

== Cup Competitions ==
=== 2022 Dockerty Cup ===
Football Victoria soccer clubs competed in 2022 for the Dockerty Cup. The tournament doubled as the Victorian qualifiers for the 2022 Australia Cup, with the top five clubs progressing to the Round of 32. A total of 211 clubs entered the qualifying phase, with the clubs entering in a staggered format.

The Cup was won by Bentleigh Greens, their third title.

In addition to the three A-League clubs (Melbourne Victory, Melbourne City and Western United), the five NPL Victoria teams (Bentleigh Greens, Green Gully, Heidelberg United, Avondale FC, and Oakleigh Cannons) competed in the final rounds of the 2022 Australia Cup.

==== Grand Final ====
6 August 2022	Oakleigh Cannons	1–2	Bentleigh Greens	Lakeside Stadium
16:00	Guest 48'	Source	Strickland 80'; Mustafa 89'
