= National Premier Leagues Victoria Women's =

- Organising body: Football Victoria
- Founded: 2016
- Country: Australia
- State: Victoria
- Number of clubs: 12
- Level on pyramid: 2
- Relegation to: VPL Women's
- League cup: Nike F.C. Cup
- Current champions: Box Hill United (2025)
- Current premiers: Heidelberg United (2025)
- Most championships: Box Hill United (8 titles)
- Most premierships: Box Hill United (7 titles)
- Broadcaster(s): YouTube
- Website: www.footballvictoria.com.au
- Current: 2026 NPL Victoria Women's

The National Premier Leagues Victoria Women's, known commonly as the NPL Victoria Women's or NPLV Women's, is a professional women's soccer league in Victoria, Australia which serves as the top-tier of women's soccer in Victoria, and is part of the National Premier Leagues Women’s structure, which is administered by Football Victoria. Prior to the introduction of the NPL in Victoria in 2016, the league was known as the Women's Victorian Premier League.

The league is contested by eleven clubs, playing a 22 round season, with the regular season running from February to September. The finals series is contested between the top four clubs, with the top two playing against third and fourth in a semi-final and the winners contesting the grand final.

== WNPL Years (2016–present) ==
The initial members of the WNPL were Alamein, Bayside United, Bulleen Lions, Box Hill United, Calder United, Heidelberg United, Geelong Galaxy United, Senior NTC and Southern United. In the following season, South Melbourne was admitted to the league who went on to win the inaugural Finals Series, 5–4 on penalties against Geelong Galaxy United. South Melbourne again made the Grand Final the following season losing 3–1 to Bulleen Lions. Despite not being crowned Champions, South Melbourne were successful in the regular season who were crowned Premiers of the 2018 season. This was a feat achieved by the club as well in their initial season in the renewed league. Calder United were crowned Grand Final Champions for the second time defeating Bulleen Lions 1–0. This was after Calder were crowned league champions prior to the finals series.

On the 27th of October 2021, Football Victoria officially announced the league would be professionalised, scrapping the amateur nature of the league.

After the cancellation of both the 2020 season and the 2021 season due to the COVID-19 pandemic, it was decided that no promotion/relegation would apply for the following season.

The 2023 season was the first time teams could be promoted since the restructuring of the women's divisions for the 2020 season. Preston Lions FC, Boroondara-Carey Eagles, and Southern United were the teams promoted from the VPL Women's after they finished in the top three positions during the 2022 season.

Football Victoria announce on 21 August 2025, that A-League Women Clubs Melbourne Victory and Melbourne City would enter an academy team into the 2026 NPLW Victoria season after years of collective lobbying. They would replace FV Emerging team. The league would also expand from 12 teams to 14 teams in the 2026 Season.

== Current clubs (2026) ==
Avondale FC and Keilor Park were promoted from the Victorian Premier League Women's for the 2026, as well as Melbourne Victory and Melbourne City ere also admitted into the league season bringing the number of teams in the competition to 14. The following clubs will take part in the 2026 NPL Victoria Women's season:

Locations of the 2025 NPL VIC Women clubs

Team	Location	Stadium
Alamein	Glen Iris	Dorothy Laver West Reserve
Avondale FC	Parkville	Avenger Park
Bentleigh Greens	Cheltenham	Kingston Heath Soccer Complex
Boroondara-Carey Eagles	Bulleen	David Barro Stadium
Box Hill United	Box Hill	Wembley Park
Bulleen Lions	Bulleen	David Barro Stadium
Essendon Royals	Essendon	Cross Keys Reserve
Heidelberg United	Heidelberg West	Olympic Park
Keilor Park	Keilor Park	Keilor Park Reserve
Melbourne City Youth	Cranbourne East	City Football Academy
Melbourne Victory Youth	Bundoora	Home of the Matildas
Preston Lions FC	Reservoir	B.T. Connor Reserve
South Melbourne	Albert Park	Lakeside Stadium
Spring Hills	Caroline Springs	Springside Recreationa Reserve

== Honours ==
Season	League	Grand Final Champions	League Premiers
1999	VPL	–	Cranbourne Comets
2000	VPL	–	Ringwood City
2001	VPL	–	Box Hill Inter
2002	VPL	–	Cranbourne Comets
2003	VPL	–	Box Hill Inter
2004	VPL	Box Hill Inter	Cranbourne Comets
2005	VPL	Box Hill Inter	Cranbourne Comets
2006	VPL	Box Hill Inter	Box Hill Inter
2007	VPL	Heidelberg United	Heidelberg United
2008	VPL	Box Hill Inter	Box Hill Inter
2009	VPL	Box Hill Inter	Box Hill Inter
2010	VPL	Box Hill Inter	Box Hill Inter
2011	VPL	South Melbourne	Sandringham
2012	VPL	Box Hill United	Box Hill United
2013	VPL	Sandringham	South Melbourne
2014	VPL	South Melbourne	South Melbourne
2015	VPL	South Melbourne	Boroondara Eagles
2016	NPL	Calder United	Calder United
2017	NPL	South Melbourne	South Melbourne
2018	NPL	Bulleen Lions	South Melbourne
2019	NPL	Calder United	Calder United
2020	NPL	Cancelled due to the COVID-19 pandemic in Australia.	
2021	NPL	Cancelled due to the COVID-19 pandemic in Australia.	
2022	NPL	Calder United	Calder United
2023	NPL	South Melbourne	Bulleen Lions
2024	NPL	Heidelberg United	Bulleen Lions
2025	NPL	Box Hill United	Heidelberg United

== Honours table ==
Team	Champions	Year(s) won	Premiers	Year(s) won	Total combined	Doubles
Box Hill United	8	2004, 2005, 2006, 2008, 2009, 2010, 2012, 2025	3	2001, 2003, 2006, 2008, 2009, 2010, 2012	12	5 (2006, 2008, 2009, 2010, 2012)
South Melbourne	5	2011, 2014, 2015, 2017, 2023	4	2013, 2014, 2017, 2018	8	2 (2014, 2017)
Calder United	3	2016, 2019, 2022	3	2016, 2019, 2022	4	3 (2016, 2019, 2022)
Heidelberg United	2	2007, 2024	2	2007, 2025	3	1 (2007)
Bulleen Lions	1	2018	2	2023, 2024	3	
Sandringham	1	2013	1	2011	2	
Cranbourne Comets	0	–	4	1999, 2002, 2004, 2005	4	
Ringwood City	0	–	1	2000	1	
Boroondara Eagles	0	–	1	2015	1	

== Player records ==
As of 1 January 2025 (prior to commencement of 2025 NPLVW season). Players listed in bold are still actively playing in the NPLVW.

Rank	Player	Appearances
1	(Australia) **Natasha Dakic**	140
2	(Australia) **Kirstie Shearing**	135
3	(Australia) Tessa Sernio	131
4	(Australia) Emma Robers	130
5	(Australia) **Elly Torre**	127
6	(Australia) Emily Dolzan	126
6	(Australia) **Emily Shields**	126
8	(Australia) **Stephanie Galea**	124
9	(Australia) **Sienna Fogarty**	121
10	(Australia) **Erin Hudson**	120

=== Top scorers ===
As of 1 January 2023 (prior to commencement of 2023 NPLVW season).

Rank	Seasons	Name	Goals
1	2018–2021	(United States) Catherine Zimmerman	81
2	2016–2021	(Australia) Melina Ayres	78
3	2016–2019	(Australia) Rachel Alonso	60
4	2017–2022	(Australia) Aleksandra Sinclair	57
4	2016–2019	(Australia) Melanie Camilleri	57
6	2016–2019	(Australia) Caitlin Friend	48
7	2017–2019	(Philippines) Angela Beard	47
8	2016–2022	(Australia) Lia Privitelli	46
9	2017–2019	(Australia) Kelsey Minton	41
10	2016–2019	(Australia) Cindy Lay	35

== See also ==
- National Premier Leagues Victoria Men's
