= Aaron Suitela =

Australian-Indonesian footballer (born 2007)

Personal information
- Full name: Aaron Liam Suitela
- Date of birth: 3 June 2007 (age 19)
- Place of birth: Melbourne, Australia
- Position: Forward

Team information
- Current team: Bulleen Lions

Youth career
- Years: Team
- Northcote City
- 2023–: Bulleen Lions

Aaron Liam Suitela (born 3 June 2007) is an Australian-Indonesian footballer who plays as a forward for Bulleen Lions.

== Early life ==
Suitela was born in Melbourne, Australia to an Indonesian father from Sumedang and a Turkish mother.

== Club career ==
Suitela played for semi-professional side Northcote City before going on to join Bulleen Lions in mid-2023. His performances in Australia earned him a trial with an unnamed Major League Soccer side in April 2023, followed by another trial with Brazilian side Atlético Mineiro in July of the same year.

== International career ==
Suitela is eligible to represent Australia, Indonesia and Turkey at international level. In July 2023, he received a call up to the Indonesia under-17 team for a training camp. As he was not a local player in Indonesia, he had to go through a preliminary round of training with fellow overseas-based players, which he passed, beating off competition from a number of other players. Under-17 manager, Bima Sakti, later explained that Suitela's "high will to continue to develop" was one of the influences on his decision to keep Suitela in the camp, and that he would be competing with Arkhan Kaka for the role of starting striker in the team.
