= Melbourne Victory FC Youth (women) =

Melbourne Victory Youth
- Full name: Melbourne Victory Football Club Youth
- Nickname: Victory
- Short name: MVC
- Founded: 2025
- Ground: The Home of the Matildas
- Capacity: 3,000
- Chairman: John Dovaston
- Manager: Jeff Hopkins
- League: NPLW Victoria
- 2026: TBD
- Website: http://www.melbournevictory.com.au
Home colours	Away colours

Melbourne Victory Football Club Youth is the youth system of Melbourne Victory (Women) based in Melbourne, Victoria. The team plays in the National Premier Leagues Women's (NPLW), the second level of the Australian soccer league system.

== History ==
=== Beginnings (2025–Present) ===
For more than a decade Melbourne Victory lobbied Football Victoria to have a women's youth team compete in the local NPLW Victoria. On 21 August 2025, Football Victoria confirmed that it intends to issue Melbourne Victory a NPLW Senior (U23) and U20 licence from season 2026. This was after both Melbourne Victory and club rivals Melbourne City worked together to lobby Football Victoria. Victory wanted to achieve this to enable Melbourne Victory to develop an even stronger program to support both youth development and their A-League Women’s elite program. After it was announced, Melbourne Victory Managing Director Caroline Carnegie described the move as “an incredible step forward for Melbourne Victory and our Women’s Academy.” and “Obtaining an NPLW and U20 license is an important part of achieving our goals for our wider Academy and pathway programs as we continue to work hard to lead, unite, connect and inspire through football,” Carnegie added. Director of Football John Didulica framed the move as the missing piece in a truly professional pathway. “Elite Victorian players will now… have access to a cohesive 52-week program where their development will be prioritised in a fully professional environment. This can only help Victoria create more national team representatives.”. Victory would set up a team for the upcoming 2026 NPLW Victoria season. Santi Escudero would be appointed as the inaugural head Coach for the team on 17 November 2025. He was selected for his experiences with European academy networks and his feat of winning the 2025 U16s Emerging Matildas Championship. On 8 December 2025 The Fixture for the 2026 NPL Victoria Women's was announced. Victory's first game would be against Bulleen Lions at the Veneto Club on 14 February 2026. Victory would win 1–0 thanks the clubs inaugural goal in the 14th minute by Leyla Hussein. On 12 May 2026 Victory would announce coach Santi Escudero will depart for an exciting coaching opportunity overseas following the Club’s Round 13 fixture against Preston Lions. After Escudero's departure the team was seventh place in the NPL Victoria Women's, sitting equal on points with sixth place Alamein FC. The Melbourne Victory Women's Senior coach Jeff Hopkins would take over as coach of the team. Victory would finish the clubs inaugural season in 8th place with a total of 35 points.

== Stadiums ==
The team play their home matches at The Home of the Matildas in Melbourne's northern suburb of Bundoora. The stadium has a total capacity of 3,000, with a single grandstand of approximately 800 seats. The Women's senior team of Melbourne Victory also plays home matches and trains at the venue.

== Season by season history ==
Season	League	Tier	Tms.	P	W	D	L	GF	GA	GD	Pts	Pos	Pro/Rel	NPLW Finals	ref
2026	NPLW Victoria	1	12	26	11	2	13	48	54	−6	35	8th	n/a	DNQ	

== See also ==
- Melbourne Victory FC
- Melbourne Victory FC Youth
- Melbourne Victory FC (W-League)
- Melbourne Victory FC AWT
