= Kurea Okino =

Japanese footballer (born 1999)

Personal information
- Date of birth: 12 July 1999 (age 27)
- Place of birth: Japan
- Height: 1.65 m (5 ft 5 in)
- Position: Striker

Senior career*
Years	Team	Apps	(Gls)
2015–2017	Tokiwagi Gakuen High School LSC	46	(6)
2018–2019	Mynavi Sendai	4	(1)
2020	AS Harima Albion	12	(2)
2021–2022	Iga FC Kunoichi Mie	24	(3)
2023	Boroondara-Carey Eagles	21	(31)
2023–2024	Melbourne Victory	17	(3)
- * Club domestic league appearances and goals

Kurea Okino (Japanese: 沖野くれあ; born 12 July 1999) is a Japanese footballer who last played as a striker for Melbourne Victory.

== Early life ==
As a youth player, Okino joined the youth academy of Japanese side Club Fields Linda. She attended Tokiwagi Gakuen High School in Japan.

== Career ==
In 2023, Okino signed for Australian side Boroondara-Carey Eagles FC. She was regarded as one of the club's most important players.

In August 2023, Okino joined A-League Women club Melbourne Victory. In August 2024, it was announced Okino wouldn't return to the club for the 2024–25 A-League Women season.

== Style of play ==
Okino mainly operates as a striker. She has been described as "dynamic and technical".

== Personal life ==
Okino was born in 1999 in Japan. She is the daughter of a footballer father.
