= Kingston Heath Soccer Complex =

Soccer stadium in Melbourne, Australia

- Interactive map of Kingston Heath Soccer Complex
- Location: 301 Centre Dandenong Road, Cheltenham
- Coordinates: 37°58′7″S 145°5′27″E
- Owner: City of Kingston
- Capacity: 3,300
- Surface: Grass

Tenants
- Bentleigh Greens; Melbourne Victory Women (2013-2014)

Kingston Heath Soccer Complex, is an Australian soccer stadium in Melbourne, Australia. It is the home of the Bentleigh Greens. The stadium has a capacity of 3,300.

== History ==
The venue underwent a $3 million redevelopment in 2010 which included pavilion upgrades, new changing rooms, as well as new synthetic pitches. This redevelopment opened in late July 2010.
