= Olympic Village (Melbourne) =

Recreational venue in Melbourne, Victoria

Olympic Park
- Olympic Village
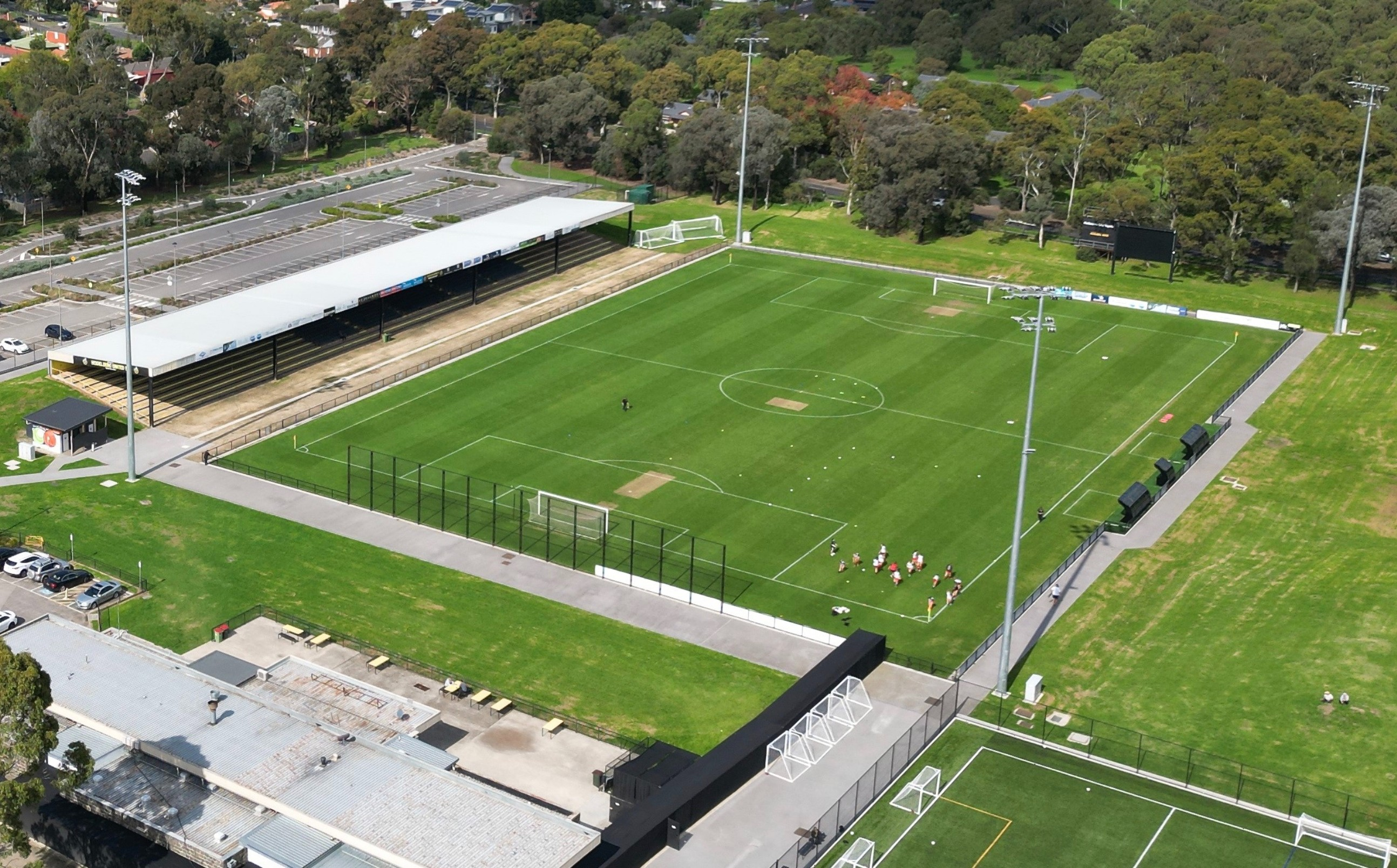
- Interactive map of Olympic Park
- Address: 55 Catalina St, Heidelberg West VIC 3081; Melbourne; Australia
- Location: Victoria, Australia
- Coordinates: 37°44′23″S 145°2′3″E
- Owner: City of Banyule
- Capacity: 12,000 (1,000 seated)
- Surface: Grass
- Record attendance: 11,372 - 29/09/15: FFA Cup: Heidelberg United vs Melbourne City
- Public transit: Northland SC/Murray Rd Larissa St/Southern Rd

Construction
- Opened: 1956
- Renovated: 2020

Tenant
- Heidelberg United

Olympic Park, commonly referred to as Olympic Village, is a rectangular football (soccer) ground and recreational space located in Heidelberg West on the western fringe of the City of Banyule. The park is an established sport and community recreation reserve with a significant history, having been originally built for the 1956 Olympic Games in Melbourne, Australia, for use as a prominent training base. The adjacent residential area, which served as the Olympic athletes village during the Games, is known locally as Olympic Village, giving the football ground its commonly used name.

Olympic Park has been home to current National Premier Leagues and former National Soccer League club Heidelberg United FC since 1982, with the reserve also hosting cricket club Olympic Colts since the early 1960s and a range of other sports, recreation and open space opportunities. The precinct is also home to Barrbunin Beek, a gathering place for Aboriginal and Torres Strait Islander people living in and around Banyule.

Plans to upgrade the football ground and broader recreational precinct were launched in 2017. The increased demand to provide functional and appropriate levels of sport and recreation infrastructure, and the shift towards more informal and casual recreation pursuits, prompted the City of Banyule Council to develop a Master Plan for Olympic Park.

In 2020, the main ground was renovated and reconfigured as a rectangular football (soccer) pitch. Lighting for the ground was upgraded, and the original athletics track was decommissioned and removed, as it was in poor condition. The ground now features a main grandstand with seating for 1,000, as well as undercover standing room. Another smaller stand flanks the opposite side of the ground, offering further undercover standing room. A grass hill surrounds the rest of the pitch, with the estimated capacity of the venue 12,000 people.

Future plans include significant improvements to cricket facilities, and the reconstruction and realignment of two additional soccer pitches, including drainage, irrigation, fencing and lighting.

A crowd of 11,372 people were in attendance to watch the 2015 FFA Cup quarter final match between Heidelberg United and Melbourne City. The game holds the record for the most attended FFA Cup (now Australia Cup) quarter final match, and remains the ground's attendance record.
