= Boroondara-Carey Eagles FC =

- Full name: Boroondara-Carey Eagles Football Club
- Founded: 1982; 44 years ago as Epping Eagles
- Ground: Carey Bulleen Sports Complex
- Chairman: Christopher Constantine
- Manager: Men: Manny Koutroulis; Women: Dilan Lomas
- League: Men: VPL 2 Women: NPLW
- 2025: Men: 12th (Relegated); Women: 7th
- Website: https://befc.com.au/

The Boroondara-Carey Eagles Football Club is an Australian semi-professional soccer club based in the Melbourne suburb of Bulleen. The club was established in 1982 as 'Epping Eagles' by the Italian community of Melbourne, and amalgamated with another three other clubs with the most recent being in February 2015.

The club fields both senior and reserves teams for men & women, and operates a junior academy under license from Football Federation Victoria. Although based primarily in Bulleen, the club trains at hosts home matches at various venues in Balwyn North, Kew, and Kew East to accommodate for the youth academy.

== History ==
=== Italian heritage of the Eagles (1982–2007) ===
The football club's history dates back to 1982 with the founding of Italian backed club, Epping Eagles SC, later renamed as 'Eagles United' and finally 'Kew Eagles', the oldest of the four original clubs that would make up the present club. The second club, Doncaster Inter SC, also an Italian backed club was founded in 1986 as 'Intercity'. Eagles and Inter would never play against each other competitively as they were in different respective leagues, and would eventually merge in early 1994 to create the Templestowe Eagles SC, this being the first of three mergers. The stronger club would see immediate success in finishing second on the ladder in the eight-tier league in 1994 and 1995, eventually finishing first and being promoted in 1996 to tier seven. 1997 would see the Eagles narrowly finish second and be promoted to tier six, one point behind Riversdale and one point ahead of Sydenham Park. The seasons of 1998-2004 would see the senior men's team hover mid-table in the sixth and fifth tiers before a recruitment drive saw the team be promoted back-to-back in 2005 and 2006 all the way to third tier, but were relegated back to fourth tier in 2007, which would be the last season before the second merger.

=== Wesley College heritage (2003–2007) and merge with Templestowe Eagles (2008–2014) ===
The third original club of the present club was 'Collegians Association Football Club', founded in late 2002 by alumni and parents of the independent school, Wesley College. Later renaming to 'Boroondara Lions' for the 2004 season onwards, its five years of existence as a standalone club in seasons 2003–2007 saw the senior men's team finish mid-table in the seventh tier league every season. The lions would never competitively face its future merger clubs, and eventually merged with Templestowe Eagles for the 2008 season to become the Boroondara Eagles. Despite optimism and established off-field stability, seasons 2008–2010 proved difficult for the revamped Eagles in seeing relegation twice down to tier six for the 2011 season which would later prove significant in the club's history.

=== Carey Grammar heritage (2005–2014) ===
The last of the original clubs was to be Old Carey SC, founded in 2005 by alumni and parents of the Kew based independent school Carey Baptist Grammar School, a fellow Associated Public Schools of Victoria of Wesley College. The club played out of the school's sports complex in Bulleen, where the present entity competes as of to the 2024 season. After mixed results in 2005–2010, the senior men's team would find itself in tier six for 2011, the same league as its future merger partner. Old Carey and Boroondara Eagles first clashed on 21 May 2011 at the Carey sports complex in what would be a 4–3 thriller with the winning fourth goal by Carey being scored at the 89th minute. In 2012, Old Carey would see default promotion to tier five, where the club would stay before its merger with the eagles in early 2015, whilst eagles would remain in tier six. The two clubs last faced each other in round fifteen of the 2012 season on 28 July, with Old Carey again prevailing at the Carey complex, winning 3–1.

=== Present day and leagues ascension (2015–present) ===
The two clubs would officially merge in late 2014, coming into effect in February 2015. The Boroondara-Carey Eagles would compete in Old Carey's tier five league spot for 2015, but would be relegated into the Victorian State League Division 4 northern conference. Whilst finishing mid-table in 2016, the resurgent Eagles would finish first three times in a row for 2017, 2018, and 2019.

== Historical Honours ==
The following list of honours was achieved by each of the four original stand-alone clubs and the two merged clubs, all of which were founded no earlier than 1982. No honours were achieved by 'Boroondara Eagles' or 'Boroondara Lions' prior to their respective merges, before the final merger at the conclusion of the 2014 season.

=== Epping Eagles/Eagles United/Kew Eagles (1982–1993) ===
- Victorian State Eleventh Tier

Third Place (promoted) (1): 1984

=== Intercity/Doncaster Inter (1986–1993) ===
- Victorian State Twelfth Tier

Third Place (promoted) (1): 1986

=== Templestowe Eagles (1994–2007) ===
- Victorian State Fourth Tier

Third Place (promoted) (1): 2006 (South-East)

- Victorian State Fifth Tier

Runner's Up (1): 2005 (South-East)

- Victorian State Seventh Tier

Runner's Up (1): 1997

- Victorian State Eighth Tier

Premiers (1): 1996 (Metropolitan)
Runner's Up (2): 1994 (Central), 1995 (Metropolitan)

- Victorian State Eighth Reserve Tier

Runner's Up (1): 1996 (Metropolitan)

=== Old Carey (2005–2014) ===
- Victorian State Sixth Tier

Runner's Up (1): 2017 (South–East)

== Recent Honours ==
- Victorian State League 1

Runner's Up (promotion) (1): 2022 (South–East)

- Victorian State League Division 2

Premiers (1): 2019 (South–East)

- Victorian State League Division 3

Premiers (1): 2018 (South–East)

- Victorian State League Division 4

Premiers (1): 2017 (North)
