= Box Hill United FC =

Box Hill United
- Full name: Box Hill United Football Club
- Nickname: Pythagoras
- Founded: 1922; 104 years ago
- Stadium: Wembley Park
- Capacity: 2000
- Chairman: George Petheriotis
- Head coach: Alfonso Ruiz
- League: Victoria Premier League 2
- 2026: 6th of 14
- Website: http://www.bhufc.com.au/
Home colours	Away colours

Box Hill United Football Club is an Australian semi-professional soccer club based in the Melbourne suburb of Box Hill. The club's men's team currently competes in the Victoria Premier League 2 (VPL2), while the women's team competes in the National Premier Leagues Victoria Women (NPL Victoria Women). United is based at Wembley Park in Box Hill South.

== History ==
Box Hill entered the Victorian Division 4 in 1925. In their first season they lost one game and drew once to become champion and win promotion to division 3 for the 1926 season. This season proved to be just as successful as they once again became league champions, this time losing just two games throughout the season. The following year they participated in the Victorian District League, where they finished fourth. The league was then suspended for three seasons before restarting in 1931. Box Hill were once again crowned champions and moved up to division one. After a couple of solid seasons placing mid table, the league was again suspended due to World War II.

When the league restarted in 1946 Box Hill remained in Victoria's top division, until 1961 when they were relegated to division two. In this period Box Hill were once crowned champions (1948) and once finished runners up (1950). Over the next 20 years the club remained mainly in the second division, achieving promotion to the state league for just 4 seasons.

From the 1983 season until they were relegated in 1990, Box Hill achieved 3 top 5 finishes. After being relegated it would take three seasons for Box Hill to return to the state league (which was now known as the Victorian Premier League) in 1995. Finishing ninth in 1995 and then twelfth in 1996, they then merged with Bulleen Lions and Brunswick Juventus to form the Bulleen Inter Kings.

From their foundation in 1922 until their merger in 1996, Box Hill had won 9 championships and 11 promotions. Winning the Victorian State League title on just one occasion in 1948, and finishing in second place on two occasions.

In late 2013, Box Hill were accepted into the National Premier Leagues Victoria, being placed into the second tier of the competition, the NPL Victoria 2. In 2014, the first season of the newly introduced competition, United finished in third place, just four points shy of the promoted North Geelong Warriors. Rinor Muriqi was a stand-out for Pythagoras, scoring on 13 occasions. In 2015, the NPL2 was split into East and West conferences. Box Hill were placed into the East conference and managed a fourth-place finish, seven points shy of the promoted Melbourne Victory Youth. In 2016 Box Hill finished in 4th place. The following season was a tough one with the club finishing in 8th place, in danger of relegation at some parts of the season. In 2018, Box Hill finished in 7th place. At the end of the season, head coach Brian Vanega resigned. United appointed Con Karagiannidis as the new interim manager in October 2018. Karagiannidis joined Box Hill having won the youth U20 NPL Victoria championship with Pascoe Vale and is his first ever job coaching men's senior football.

== Women's team ==
Box Hill also fields a team in the Victorian Women's Premier League competition. Box Hill's women have enjoyed enormous success since the turn of the 20th century, winning the first of their nine WPL titles in 2001. Fourth in 2002, Box Hill then reclaimed its title in 2003, beginning a run of four straight championship wins. Heidelberg United defeated Box Hill in the 2007 Grand Final to break the winning sequence but Box Hill avenged that loss in 2008 to win back its crown and they were again successful in 2009 and 2010. After slipping out of the finals in 2011, Box Hill returned stronger than ever and became the first team in the modern era to not only win an unprecedented treble of the Minor Championship, Cup and Grand Final but also remained undefeated for the whole season. 2013 saw Box Hill finish second in the regular season before falling in the finals in straight sets. 2014 and 2015 has been a rebuilding period for the club with the team finishing mid-table.

A stalwart of the club, Melissa Barbieri represented Australia between 2002 and 2015 as well as being named captain in 2010–2013. In 2015 she was also inducted into the FFV Hall of Fame for all her achievements. Bisby and Selin Kuralay were two other players that represented Australia and with Digiammarco, Tal Karp, Marlies Oostdam, Jessica Humble & Emily Hulbert, has played with Melbourne Victory.

WPL Champions: 2001 (First-past-the-post), 2003 (First-past-the-post), 2004 (Defeated Cranbourne Comets 1–0 in Grand Final), 2005 (Defeated Cranbourne Comets 1–1 [4–3 on penalties] in Grand Final), 2006 (Defeated Heidelberg United 1–0 in Grand Final), 2008 (Defeated Heidelberg United 1–0 in Grand Final), 2009 (Defeated Heidelberg United 2–0 in Grand Final), 2010 (Defeated Heidelberg United 2–1 in Grand Final), 2012 (Defeated Bundoora United 3–3 [4–3 on penalties] in Grand Final)

== Naming ==
The club was originally formed in 1922 as Box Hill Soccer Club. This name remained until the conclusion of the 1991 season where they merged with Clayton Inter to become Box Hill Inter Soccer Club. In 1996 Bulleen Zebras and Brunswick Juventus coalesced with Box Hill to create the Bulleen Inter Kings for the 1997 Victorian Premier League season. Box Hill's juniors then became known as Box Hill-Clayton Inter Kings. At the time of the merger with Bulleen and Brunswick many of the original Clayton Inter club members broke away to form another club, Clayton SC, which changed its name to Waverley Victory Football Club in 2010. In December 2010 the club merged with Southern Suburbs to form Box Hill United SC, adopting the Pythagoras nickname associated with the club.

== Wembley Park ==
Wembley Park is situated on Canterbury Road, Box Hill South. Wembley Park's facilities include a 300+ seat grand stand, press box, function room (condemned) as well as a second change room facility. Training is conducted opposite the main ground at 'Sparks Reserve Upper'.

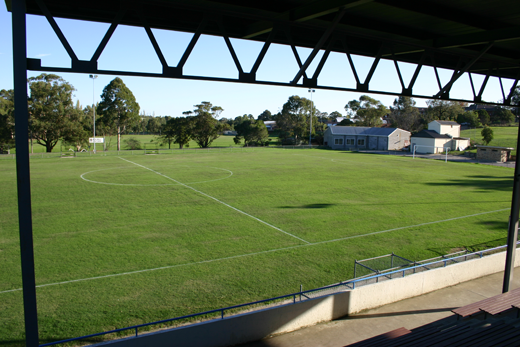
View Facing West April 2009

== See also ==
- Official Website
