= Essendon Royals SC =

Essendon Royals
- Full name: Essendon Royals Soccer Club
- Nickname: Royals
- Founded: 1958; 68 years ago (earliest form); 1959; 67 years ago as Unione Sportiva Triestina; 1995; 31 years ago as Essendon-Brunswick Royals (present entity)
- Ground: Cross Keys Reserve (Juniors) and Ormond Park (Seniors)
- Chairman: Richie Di Sauro
- Manager: Vitale Ferrante
- League: Victoria Premier League 2
- 2026: 4th of 14
- Website: www.essendonroyals.com.au

Essendon Royals Soccer Club is an Australian semi-professional soccer club based in the North-Western Melbourne local government area of Moonee Valley. The club's senior men's squad currently participates in the Victoria Premier League 2, following promotion from Victorian State League 1 in 2022. The senior women's squad compete in Victoria Women's State League Division 1 North-West.

== History ==
The club was originally founded as Unione Sportiva Triestina in 1959 by Italian immigrants from the seaport city of Trieste. Prior to the 1995 season, the club had completed its last merge of four merges, with six other original stand-alone clubs to form 'Essendon-Brunswick Royals', later renaming to its present name Essendon Royals for the 1999 season.

The club had two stints in the Victorian Premier League (VPL), the second highest level in Australian soccer, in 2001 and from 2003 to 2007.

The club has a current membership over 700 and currently fields teams in junior boys and girls leagues from 8 years to seniors. In August 2019, the club was granted a National Premier Leagues Victoria junior licence for its u13 to u16 teams.

Vitale Ferrante was appointed as the club's senior men's coach for the 2020 season. After the COVID-19 pandemic resulted in the cancellation of the 2020 and 2021 seasons, Essendon Royals achieved promotion from Men's State League 1 North-West to National Premier Leagues Victoria 3 in the 2022 season. Earlier in the year, Vitale Ferrante stepped away from the head coach job, with his brother Michael Ferrante, an ex-professional footballer and until then player at the Royals since mid-2019, took over the manager role.

== Historical honours (1958–1994) ==
=== Anstey Roma (1968–1969) ===
- Victorian Sixth Tier

Premiers (1): 1968 (Central)

=== Central Brunswick/Dallas City/Ivanhoe City (1973–1987) ===
- Victorian Eighth Tier

Premiers (1): 1984

- Victorian Eleventh Tier

Premiers (1): 1977

=== East Brunswick (1970–1986) ===
- Victorian Sixth Tier

Third Place (promotion) (1): 1983

- Victorian Seventh Tier

Premiers (2): 1972 (East), 1975 (East)

=== East Brunswick–Ivanhoe (1988–1994) ===
- Victorian Fourth Tier

Runners–up (1): 1991

- Victorian Fifth Tier

Premiers (1): 1990

=== Fiorentina (1958–1963) ===
- Victorian Second Tier

Runners–up (2): 1961, 1963

- Victorian Third Tier

Runners–up (1): 1959

=== Moonee Ponds (1973–1982) ===
- Victorian Tenth Tier

Third Place (promotion) (1): 1977

=== Unione Sportiva Triestina/Maribyrnong Triestina/Essendon City Jets (1958–1994) ===
- Victorian Second Tier

Premiers (1): 1963
Runners–up (1): 1986

- Victorian Third Tier

Premiers (1): 1962

- Victorian Fourth Tier

Runners–up (1): 1985

- Victorian Fifth Tier

Premiers (1): 1973
Runners–up (1): 1976
Third Place (promotion) (1): 1983

== Recent honours (1995–present) ==
- Victorian Second Tier

Runners–up (2): 2000, 2002

- Victorian Third Tier

Runners–up (1): 1999

- Victorian Fourth Tier

Runners–up (2): 2016 (North–West), 2022 (North–West)

- Victorian Fifth Tier

Premiers (1): 2014 (North–West)

- Victorian Seventh Tier

Runners–up (1): 2011

== See also ==
- List of sports clubs inspired by others
