= FFV NTC =

- Full name: Football Federation Victoria National Training Centre
- Short name: FFV NTC
- Founded: 2010
- Ground: State Football Centre, Darebin
- Manager: Boris Seroshtan
- League: PS4 NPL U16 West
Home colours	Away colours

The Football Federation Victoria National Training Centre (FFV NTC) is run by Football Federation Australia and Football Federation Victoria, in Melbourne, for Victorian youth players. Up to 2010 it was run by the Victorian Institute of Sport.

== Program ==
The men's program aims to prepare players for selection in the Australia U17 squad and FFA Centre of Excellence program. Between 20 and 25 scholarships are awarded each year to athletes who are 13–17 years old that show the potential to represent Australia at U-17 level.

The team competes regularly in the National Premier Leagues Victoria Under 18 East division, which acts as preparation for the FFA National Institute Challenge in December of each year.

== Recent history ==
The NTC squad, led by coach Boris Seroshtan won its first National Institute Challenge in December 2013 without losing a single game, finishing six points clear of Football New South Wales NTC.

Several players of that squad have since graduated the program to sign for different clubs including Melbourne Victory and Melbourne City FC. One of the star performers, Jake Brimmer has since gone on to sign for English football giants Liverpool F.C., as well as making nine appearances for the Australian Under-17s squad.

Despite losing the core of its squad for the 2014 edition of the National Institute Challenge, the Victoria NTC defied the odds to win a second consecutive title, losing only once on its way to beating Queensland Academy of Sport by two points.

== Current technical staff ==
Position	Staff
Head Coach	Boris Seroshtan
Assistant Coach	Michael McBride
Goalkeeping Coach	Jeff Olver
Talent Development Manager - Girls	Annick Fokchak
Talent Development Manager - Boys	Andrew Kenta
Technical Assistance for Women NTC	Lisa de Vanna

== Notable former players ==
As of 13 November 2020

Name	Current club	Position	Years	Current Status
Curran Singh Ferns	(Malaysia) Melaka United	MF	2009–2010	Playing
Jamie Maclaren	(Australia) Melbourne City	FW	2009–2010	Playing
Curtis Good	(Australia) Melbourne City	DF	2009–2010	Playing
Petar Franjic	(Australia) Dandenong City	DF	2007–2009	Playing
Kamal Ibrahim	(Australia) Port Melbourne	MF	2007–2009	Playing
Bailey Wright	(England) Sunderland	DF	2007–2008	Playing
Matthew Spiranovic	Unattached	DF	2004–2005	Playing
Apostolos Giannou	(Greece) OFI	FW	2005–2006	Playing
Leigh Broxham	(Australia) Melbourne Victory	MF	2003–2006	Playing
Kristian Sarkies	(Australia) Beaumaris	MF	2002–2003	Playing
Adrian Leijer	(Australia) Dandenong City	DF	2002–2003	Playing
Spase Dilevski	–	DF	2000–2001	Retired
Billy Celeski	–	MF	2000–2001	Retired
Simon Storey	–	DF	1997–2000	Retired
Naum Sekulovski	(Australia) Preston Lions	MF	1999–2000	Playing
Vince Grella	–	MF	1993–1996	Retired
Levent Osman	–	DF	1994–1996	Retired
Danny Allsopp	–	FW	1994–1995	Retired
Tom Pondeljak	–	MF	1992–1993	Retired
