= FC Bulleen Lions =

Bulleen Lions
- Full name: FC Bulleen Lions
- Nicknames: Bulleen, Lions
- Founded: 1974
- Ground: David Barro Stadium
- Capacity: 3000
- Chairman: Lou Crema
- Manager: Crisdion Krstevski
- League: Victoria Premier League 1
- 2025: 8th of 14
- Website: bulleenlions.com.au
Home colours	Away colours

FC Bulleen Lions is an Australian semi-professional football club based in the Melbourne suburb Bulleen. Founded in 1974 by Melbourne's Italian community, the club currently competes in the Victoria Premier League 1, the second highest level of Victorian state soccer. Since its inception, the club has been based at David Barro stadium in the Veneto Club when it was both a stand-alone and a merged club.

Bulleen has competed at the highest level in two separate stints in 1988–1996 and 2016–2018, where the club were premiers and champions in 1993. From 1997 to 2007, the club competed as Bulleen Inter Kings (subsequently Bulleen Zebras) after merges with Box Hill, Brunswick Zebras, Clayton Inter, and Essendon Royals. In this time, another two more premierships were achieved in 1998 and 2004.

== History ==
FC Bulleen Lions was founded in 1974. The team wore maroon and gold kits. The Club initially competed in the VSF North Division. In 1977, Bulleen moved up to Provisional League Two. In 1983, after finishing second in Provisional League Two the year before, Bulleen were granted a licence to participate in the third division of the Metropolitan league. In 1985, Bulleen were promoted to the second division of the Metro league. In 1987 Bulleen won the Division 1 championship by one point against Ringwood City Wilhelmina. In 1987, the senior team was promoted to the State League, the then top division of football in Victoria.

In 1991, Bulleen were accepted into the reformed Victorian Premier League, which replaced the old State League. Bulleen finished the season equal first with Juventus, but lost out on top spot by virtue of a lower goal difference.

In 1993, Bulleen became known as the Bulleen Lions. That was a famous year for the club as the first major title was secured, first winning the Premiers Plate for their first-place finish and then grabbing the Championship by beating Fawkner in the Grand Final. Bulleen reached the Grand Final again in 1995, but lost out to Altona Magic SC 3–2 at Olympic Park.

In 1997, Brunswick Zebras merged with Bulleen Lions and Box Hill Inter to become the Bulleen Inter Kings. Bulleen Inter Kings later changed their name to the Bulleen Zebras.

In 2007, the club hosted no senior team. In 2008, Essendon Royals played out of the Veneto Club and formed the Bulleen Royals, playing in the First Division. From 2009 onwards, the seniors were once again known as the FC Bulleen Lions, reverting to their original colours of maroon and gold. The club finished mid-table in the Victorian State League 1 for five consecutive seasons from 2009 to 2013.

=== National Premier Leagues ===
2014 saw Bulleen participate in the inaugural National Premier Leagues Victoria 2 campaign, finishing in fifth place in the 14 team competition under head coach Fabrizio Soncin. Joey Katebian was the league's equal top goalscorer, tied with Tom Cahill on 26 goals.

Bulleen appointed a new coach for the 2015 season, with Domenic Barba replacing Soncin. The 2015 NPL2 competition was split into East and West conferences. The Lions achieved promotion back into the top flight of Victorian football after topping the NPL2 West competition, finishing the season on 57 points, six ahead of second placed Moreland Zebras.

In the off-season, Bulleen added former A-League goalkeeper Griffin McMaster as well as Ersin Kaya. Bulleen opened their NPL Victoria season with a 1–0 loss to Bentleigh Greens, before a 1–0 win over Oakleigh Cannons and then two successive draws to Melbourne Victory Youth and South Melbourne, with the match against South drawing over 2,000 people to the Veneto Club, the largest attendance at the ground for a Bulleen match in many years. Bulleen finished in 11th place, two points clear of the relegation playoff spot after defeating Hume City FC 2–0 at ABD Stadium on the final match-day of the season. A few weeks after the end of the season, head coach Dom Barba departed the club to take up a role at Port Melbourne.

In preparing for the 2017 season, Bulleen appointed former Dandenong City coach Aaron Healey as the club's new senior head coach. Bulleen finished the season in 9th place.

After a 5–1 home loss to Port Melbourne in Round 6, Healey was sacked by Bulleen and replaced by John Maisano. Maisano was unable to keep the Lions in the division, with his side finishing in bottom place in 2018, returning to the NPL Victoria 2.

== Honours ==
=== Stand-alone honours (1974–1996, 2008–present) ===
- Victorian State First Tier Finals
  - Champions (1): 1993
  - Runners-up (1): 1995
- Victorian State First Tier
  - Premiership (1): 1993
  - Runners-up (3): 1991, 1992, 1994
- Victorian State First Tier Reserves
  - Runners-up (2): 1992, 1993
- Victorian State Second Tier
  - Premiership (1): 2015
- Victorian State Third Tier
  - Premiership (1): 1987
- Victorian State Fourth Tier
  - Premiership (1): 1986
- Victorian State Fifth Tier
  - Third place (promotion) (1): 1985
- Victorian State Sixth Tier
  - Fourth place (promotion) (1): 1983
- Victorian State Seventh Tier
  - Runners-up (1): 1982
- Victorian State Eighth Tier
  - Fifth place (promotion) (1): 1981

=== Merged honours as Bulleen Inter Kings/Bulleen Zebras (1997–2006) ===
- Victorian State First Tier Finals
  - Champions (2): 1998, 2004
  - Runners-up (1): 1997
- Victorian State First Tier Reserves
  - Runners-up (1): 1998
