= 2026–27 Melbourne Victory FC season =

Melbourne Victory
2026–27 season
- Chairman: John Dovaston
- Head Coach: Giovanni Savarese
- Stadium: AAMI Park
- A-League Men: 9th
- Australia Cup: Runner-up
- AFC Champions League Two: Group stage
- Top goalscorer: League: Keegan Jelacic; Jordi Valadon (2 goals each); All: Keegan Jelacic (4 goals each)
- Highest home attendance: 19,008 vs. Melbourne City (24 October 2026); A-League Men
- Lowest home attendance: 10,013 vs. Central Coast Mariners (1 November 2026); A-League Men
- Average home league attendance: 14,511
- Biggest win: 4–0 vs. Kingborough Lions United (A) (26 July 2026); Australia Cup
- Biggest defeat: 1–2 vs. Wellington Phoenix (A) (18 October 2026); A-League Men
Home colours	Away colours
- All statistics correct as of 21 November 2026.

The 2026–27 season is Melbourne Victory Football Club's 22nd season in the A-League Men. In addition to the domestic league, Melbourne Victory participated in this season's edition of the Australia Cup and 2026–27 AFC Champions League Two.

== Players ==
=== First-team squad ===
Note: Flags indicate national team as defined under FIFA eligibility rules; some limited exceptions apply. Players may hold more than one non-FIFA nationality.

No.	Pos.	Nation	Player
1	GK	AUS	Jack Warshawsky
3	DF	AUS	Jason Davidson (captain)
4	DF	GER	Philipp Ziereis (vice-captain)
5	DF	AUS	Brendan Hamill
6	MF	AUS	Louis D'Arrigo
8	MF	AUS	Jordi Valadon
9	FW	AUS	Harry Sawyer
10	MF	AUS	Denis Genreau
11	FW	BRA	Santos
14	MF	AUS	Matthew Grimaldi
15	DF	WAL	Tom Lockyer (vice-captain)
16	DF	AUS	Joshua Inserra (scholarship)
18	DF	AUS	Franco Lino (on loan from Viking)

No.	Pos.	Nation	Player
19	MF	AUS	Oliver Dragicevic
21	FW	URU	Guillermo May
22	MF	AUS	Xavier Stella
23	MF	AUS	Keegan Jelacic
24	FW	AUS	Malik Olukhale
25	GK	AUS	Jack Duncan
26	MF	AUS	Jack Mihailidis
28	DF	AUS	William Kengni
29	FW	AUS	Mikey Ghossaini
30	GK	AUS	Daniel Graskoski (scholarship)
36	DF	AUS	Harry Shillington
44	FW	JPN	Charles Nduka

== Transfers and contracts ==
=== Transfers in ===
No.	Position	Player	Transferred from	Type/fee	Contract length	Date	Ref.
36	DF	Harry Shillington	Unattached	Free transfer	2 years	5 July 2026	
9	FW	Harry Sawyer	Unattached	Free transfer	2 years	6 July 2026	
4	DF	(Germany) Philipp Ziereis	(Germany) Greuther Fürth	Free transfer	2 years	10 July 2026	
15	DF	(Wales) Tom Lockyer	Unattached	Free transfer	1 year	11 July 2026	
21	FW	(Uruguay) Guillermo May	Unattached	Free transfer	1 year	13 September 2026	

==== From youth squad ====
No.	Position	Player	Age	Notes	Ref
28	DF	William Kengni	17		
24	FW	Malik Olukhale	17		
29	FW	Mikey Ghossaini	18		
26	MF	Jack Mihailidis	19		

=== Transfers out ===
No.	Position	Player	Transferred to	Type/fee	Date	Ref
19	FW	Jing Reec	Macarthur FC	Mutual contract termination	20 May 2026	
3	DF	(Ivory Coast) Adama Traoré	(Australia) Avondale	End of contract	27 June 2026	
4	DF	Lachlan Jackson	Unattached	End of contract	30 June 2026	
7	FW	Reno Piscopo	Unattached	End of contract	30 June 2026	
9	FW	(Greece) Nikos Vergos	Newcastle Jets	End of contract	30 June 2026	
15	DF	Sebastian Esposito	(Italy) Lecce	End of loan	30 June 2026	
21	DF	(Portugal) Roderick Miranda	Unattached	End of contract	30 June 2026	
22	DF	Josh Rawlins	(Scotland) Dundee United	Compensation	30 June 2026	
24	MF	Emre Sağlam	(Turkey) Gençlerbirliği	End of loan	30 June 2026	
28	DF	Kayne Razmovski	(Australia) Heidelberg United	End of contract	30 June 2026	
64	MF	(Spain) Juan Mata	Unattached	End of contract	30 June 2026	
17	MF	Nishan Velupillay	(Germany) FC Ingolstadt 04	Undisclosed	19 August 2026	

=== Contract extensions ===
No.	Position	Player	Duration	Date	Notes	Ref
26	Midfielder	Jack Mihailidis		2 July 2026		
44	Striker	(Japan) Charles Nduka	2 years	3 July 2026		
1	Goalkeeper	Jack Warshawsky	3 years	5 July 2026		
18	Left-back	Franco Lino	1 year	7 July 2026	Extension of loan	
5	Centre-back	Brendan Hamill	1 year	8 July 2026		
25	Goalkeeper	Jack Duncan	1 year	10 July 2026		

== Pre-season and friendlies ==
15 July 2026	Caroline Springs George Cross (Australia)	0–5	(Australia) Melbourne Victory	Melbourne
19:15 AEST		Report	Nduka 27'; Mihailidis 78'; Sawyer 86', 87', 88'	Stadium: DEKA Park City Vista Pavilion & Sports Field

26 August 2026	St Albans Dinamo (Australia)	1–7	(Australia) Melbourne Victory	Melbourne
19:15 AEST	Goal	Report	Grimaldi; Matina; Sawyer; Carrocci	Stadium: Churchill Reserve
Note: Match was played over 120 minutes

3 September 2026	Oakleigh Cannons (Australia)	1–2	(Australia) Melbourne Victory	Melbourne
19:30 AEST	Boyce 90+3'	Report	Lino 29'; Jelacic 50'	Stadium: Jack Edwards Reserve

== Competitions ==
=== Overall record ===
Competition	First match	Last match	Starting round	Final position	Record							
Competition	First match	Last match	Starting round	Final position	Pld	W	D	L	GF	GA	GD	Win %
A-League Men	18 October 2026	9 May 2027	Matchday 1		5	0	4	1	6	7	−1	0.00
Australia Cup	26 July 2026	10 October 2026	Round of 32	Runner-up	5	3	2	0	9	2	+7	60.00
AFC Champions League Two	16 September 2026		Group stage		4	1	1	2	5	5	+0	25.00
Total					14	4	7	3	20	14	+6	28.57

Last updated: 21 November 2026
Source: Competitions

=== A-League Men ===
==== League table ====
Pos	Team	Pld	W	D	L	GF	GA	GD	Pts
7	Auckland FC (Note: Auckland FC and Wellington Phoenix cannot qualify for Asian Football Confederation competitions as they are based in New Zealand, which is part of the Oceania Football Confederation.)	5	1	3	1	7	8	−1	6
8	Macarthur FC	4	1	2	1	4	4	0	5
9	Melbourne Victory	5	0	4	1	6	7	−1	4
10	Central Coast Mariners	5	0	3	2	4	9	−5	3
11	Newcastle Jets	4	0	2	2	4	8	−4	2

Updated to match(es) played on 21 November 2026. Source: A-Leagues
Rules for classification: 1) points; 2) goal difference; 3) goals scored; 4) wins; 5) head-to-head results; 5a) head-to-head points; 5b) head-to-head goal difference; 6) Fair Play points; 7) away goal difference; 8) away goals per match; 9) home goal difference; 10) home goals per match; 11) toss of a coin in an event of a tie of two clubs.

==== Results summary ====
Overall								Home						Away					
Pld	W	D	L	GF	GA	GD	Pts	W	D	L	GF	GA	GD	W	D	L	GF	GA	GD
5	0	4	1	6	7	−1	4	0	2	0	2	2	0	0	2	1	4	5	−1

Last updated: 21 November 2026.
Source: Ultimate A-League

==== Results by round ====
Round	1	2	3	4	5	6	7	8	9	10	11	12	13	14	15	16	17	18	19	20	21	22	23	24	25	26	27	28
Ground	A	H	H	A	A	B	A	H	A	H	H	A	H	H	A	A	H	B	H	H	A	A	A	H	H	A	A	H
Result	L	D	D	D	D	X												X										
Position	11	8	9	9																								
Points	0	1	2	3	4																							

Updated to match(es) played on 21 November 2026. Source: Ultimate A-League
A = Away; H = Home; N = Neutral; B = Bye; W = Win; D = Draw; L = Loss; X = Bye

==== Matches ====
Fixtures released on 16 July 2026.

Win Draw Loss Fixtures

18 October 2026 1	Wellington Phoenix	2–1	Melbourne Victory	Wellington
13:00 AEST	Piper 14'; Bidois 77'	Report	Nduka 24'	Stadium: Hnry Stadium; Attendance: 8,254; Referee: Lachlan Keevers

24 October 2026 2	Melbourne Victory	1–1	Melbourne City	Melbourne
19:40 AEST	Jelacic 7'	Report	Nabbout 53'	Stadium: AAMI Park; Attendance: 19,008; Referee: Daniel Elder

1 November 2026 3	Melbourne Victory	1–1	Central Coast Mariners	Melbourne
15:00 AEST	Valadon 69'	Report	Lavale 63'	Stadium: AAMI Park; Attendance: 10,013; Referee: Jonathan Barreiro

8 November 2026 4	Adelaide United	2–2	Melbourne Victory	Adelaide
17:00 AEST	Burkitt 45+3'; Garuccio 90+9'	Report	Valadon 64'; Jelacic 70'	Stadium: Coopers Stadium; Attendance: 13,541; Referee: Daniel Elder

21 November 2026 5	Auckland FC	1–1	Melbourne Victory	Auckland
17:00 NZDT	Bayliss 89'	Report	Sawyer 38'	Stadium: Go Media Stadium; Attendance: 10,093; Referee: Nathan Shakespear

6 December 2026 7	Sydney FC	v	Melbourne Victory	Sydney
17:00 AEST				Stadium: Allianz Stadium

12 December 2026 8	Melbourne Victory	v	Newcastle Jets	Melbourne
19:40 AEST				Stadium: AAMI Park

19 December 2026 9	Melbourne City	v	Melbourne Victory	Melbourne
19:40 AEST				Stadium: AAMI Park

29 December 2026 10	Melbourne Victory	v	Wellington Phoenix	Melbourne
19:00 AEST				Stadium: AAMI Park

3 January 2027 11	Melbourne Victory	v	Perth Glory	Melbourne
17:00 AEST				Stadium: AAMI Park

9 January 2027 12	Brisbane Roar	v	Melbourne Victory	Brisbane
18:00 AEST				Stadium: Kayo Stadium

15 January 2027 13	Melbourne Victory	v	Auckland FC	Melbourne
19:40 AEST				Stadium: AAMI Park

26 January 2027 14	Melbourne Victory	v	Sydney FC	Melbourne
19:40 AEST				Stadium: AAMI Park

30 January 2027 15	Newcastle Jets	v	Melbourne Victory	Newcastle
17:00 AEST				Stadium: McDonald Jones Stadium

6 February 2027 16	Adelaide United	v	Melbourne Victory	Adelaide
19:40 AEST				Stadium: Coopers Stadium

14 February 2027 17	Melbourne Victory	v	Western Sydney Wanderers	Melbourne
17:00 AEST				Stadium: AAMI Park

27 February 2027 19	Melbourne Victory	v	Macarthur FC	Melbourne
19:40 AEST				Stadium: AAMI Park

6 March 2027 20	Melbourne Victory	v	Melbourne City	Melbourne
19:40 AEST				Stadium: AAMI Park

14 March 2027 21	Perth Glory	v	Melbourne Victory	Perth
19:00 AEST				Stadium: HBF Park

21 March 2027 22	Brisbane Roar	v	Melbourne Victory	Brisbane
17:00 AEST				Stadium: Suncorp Stadium

4 April 2027 23	Central Coast Mariners	v	Melbourne Victory	Gosford
15:00 AEST		Source		Stadium: Polytec Stadium

10 April 2027 24	Melbourne Victory	v	Sydney FC	Melbourne
19:40 AEST				Stadium: AAMI Park

17 April 2027 25	Melbourne Victory	v	Adelaide United	Melbourne
19:40 AEST				Stadium: AAMI Park

26 April 2027 26	Macarthur FC	v	Melbourne Victory	Sydney
19:00 AEST				Stadium: Campbelltown Stadium

2 May 2027 27	Western Sydney Wanderers	v	Melbourne Victory	Sydney
15:00 AEST				Stadium: CommBank Stadium

9 May 2027 28	Melbourne Victory	v	Brisbane Roar	Melbourne
15:00 AEST				Stadium: AAMI Park

=== Australia Cup ===
26 July 2026 Round of 32	Kingborough Lions United	0–4	Melbourne Victory	Kingston
17:00 AEST		Report	Ziereis 14'; Grimaldi 40'; Santos 62'; Jelacic 90'	Stadium: Kitchen Centre Park; Attendance: 2,875

8 August 2026 Round of 16	Western Sydney Wanderers	1–1 (a.e.t.) (2–3 p)	Melbourne Victory	Sydney
19:30 AEST	Milanovic 102'	Report	Sawyer 97'	Stadium: Marconi Stadium; Referee: Adam Bavcar
	Penalties
	Milanovic (penalty scored); Borrello (penalty scored); Scicluna (penalty missed); Lual (penalty missed); Gersbach (penalty missed)		(penalty scored) D'Arrigo; (penalty scored) Sawyer; (penalty scored) Ghossaini; (penalty missed) Nduka

19 August 2026 Quarter-final	APIA Leichhardt	0–1 (a.e.t.)	Melbourne Victory	Sydney
19:30 AEST		Report	Sawyer 93'	Stadium: Leichhardt Oval; Attendance: 2,117; Referee: Tom Dale

9 September 2026 Semi-final	Sydney FC	0–2	Melbourne Victory	Sydney
19:30 AEST		Report	Jelacic 2'; Courtney-Perkins 61' (o.g.)	Stadium: Jubilee Stadium; Attendance: 3,187; Referee: Muhammad Taqi (Singapore)

10 October 2026 Final	South Melbourne	1–1 (a.e.t.) (4–3 p)	Melbourne Victory	Melbourne
19:35 AEDT	Mikkola 117'	Report	Genreau 95'	Stadium: AAMI Park; Attendance: 29,911; Referee: Alireza Faghani
	Penalties
	Jankovic (penalty scored); Swibel (penalty scored); Lackay (penalty scored); Mesourouni (penalty scored)		(penalty scored) May; (penalty missed) Sawyer; (penalty scored) Ghossaini; (penalty scored) Genreau; (penalty missed) Davidson

=== AFC Champions League Two ===
Pos	Team	Pld	W	D	L	GF	GA	GD	Pts	Qualification	SIB	SEO	MVC	TCV
1	(Indonesia) Persib (A)	4	4	0	0	6	1	+5	12	Advance to round of 16	—	–	2–0	1–0
2	(South Korea) FC Seoul	4	2	0	2	8	4	+4	6	Advance to round of 16	0–1	—	–	3–0
3	(Australia) Melbourne Victory	4	1	1	2	5	5	0	4		1–2	3–0	—	–
4	(Vietnam) Thể Công–Viettel	4	0	1	3	1	10	−9	1		–	0–5	1–1	—

Updated to match(es) played on 4 November 2026. Source: ACL2
Rules for classification: Tiebreakers
(A) Advance to a further round

16 September 2026 1	Thể Công–Viettel (Vietnam)	1–1	(Australia) Melbourne Victory	Hanoi, Vietnam
19:15 ICT	Ribamar 62'	Report	Santos 58'	Stadium: Hàng Đẫy Stadium; Attendance: 4,800; Referee: Ismaeel Habib Ali (Bahrain)

14 October 2026 2	Melbourne Victory (Australia)	3–0	(South Korea) FC Seoul	Melbourne, Australia
18:45 AEDT	May 63'; Santos 73'; Valadon 84'	Report		Stadium: Melbourne Rectangular Stadium; Attendance: 2,198; Referee: Clifford Daypuyat (Philippines)

28 October 2026 3	Persib (Indonesia)	2–0	(Australia) Melbourne Victory	Soreang, Indonesia
19:15 WIB	Sekulić 47', 67'	Report		Stadium: Si Jalak Harupat Stadium; Attendance: 15,496; Referee: Sami Al-Ismail (Saudi Arabia)

4 November 2026 4	Melbourne Victory (Australia)	1–2	(Indonesia) Persib	Melbourne, Australia
18:45 AEDT	César 71' (o.g.)	Report	Menalo 85'; Sekulić 90'	Stadium: Melbourne Rectangular Stadium; Attendance: 3,000; Referee: Clifford Daypuyat (Philippines)

25 November 2026 5	Melbourne Victory (Australia)	v	(Vietnam) Thể Công–Viettel	Geelong, Australia
18:45 AEDT		Source		Stadium: Kardinia Park

2 December 2026 6	FC Seoul (South Korea)	v	(Australia) Melbourne Victory	Seoul, South Korea
19:00 KST		Source		Stadium: Seoul World Cup Stadium

== Statistics ==
=== Appearances and goals ===
Includes all competitions. Players with no appearances not included in the list.

As of 21 November 2026

No.	Pos.	Nat.	Name	A-League Men		Australia Cup		AFC Champions League Two		Total	
No.	Pos.	Nat.	Name	Apps	Goals	Apps	Goals	Apps	Goals	Apps	Goals
1	GK	(Australia)	Jack Warshawsky	0	0	0	0	1	0	1	0
3	DF	(Australia)	Jason Davidson	5	0	5	0	2	0	12	0
4	DF	(Germany)	Philipp Ziereis	3+1	0	3+1	1	3	0	11	1
5	DF	(Australia)	Brendan Hamill	2+1	0	0+1	0	2+2	0	8	0
6	MF	(Australia)	Louis D'Arrigo	3	0	4	0	1+1	0	9	0
8	MF	(Australia)	Jordi Valadon	5	2	5	0	2+1	1	13	3
9	FW	(Australia)	Harry Sawyer	1+1	1	0+4	2	2+1	0	9	3
10	MF	(Australia)	Denis Genreau	3+2	0	0+2	1	3+1	0	11	1
11	FW	(Brazil)	Santos	4+1	0	5	1	2+2	2	14	3
14	MF	(Australia)	Matthew Grimaldi	3+2	0	5	1	2+2	0	14	1
15	DF	(Wales)	Tom Lockyer	1+1	0	2+1	0	2+1	0	8	0
16	DF	(Australia)	Joshua Inserra	2	0	5	0	2	0	9	0
18	DF	(Australia)	Franco Lino	4+1	0	5	0	2+1	0	13	0
21	FW	(Uruguay)	Guillermo May	3+1	0	0+1	0	2	1	7	1
22	MF	(Australia)	Xavier Stella	0+2	0	1+1	0	2+2	0	8	0
23	MF	(Australia)	Keegan Jelacic	4+1	2	5	2	4	0	14	4
24	FW	(Australia)	Malik Olukhale	0	0	0+2	0	0	0	2	0
25	GK	(Australia)	Jack Duncan	5	0	5	0	3	0	13	0
26	MF	(Australia)	Jack Mihailidis	0	0	0+2	0	0	0	2	0
29	FW	(Australia)	Mikey Ghossaini	0+4	0	0+4	0	2+2	0	12	0
36	DF	(Australia)	Harry Shillington	3	0	0+4	0	3+1	0	11	0
44	FW	(Japan)	Charles Nduka	4+1	1	5	0	2+2	0	14	1

=== Disciplinary record ===
Includes all competitions. The list is sorted by squad number when total cards are equal. Players with no cards not included in the list.

As of 1 November 2026

Rank	No.	Pos.	Nat.	Name	A-League Men			Australia Cup			AFC Champions League Two			Total		
Rank	No.	Pos.	Nat.	Name	Yellow card	(yellow card) (yellow-red card)	Red card	Yellow card	(yellow card) (yellow-red card)	Red card	Yellow card	(yellow card) (yellow-red card)	Red card	Yellow card	(yellow card) (yellow-red card)	Red card
1	36	DF	(Australia)	Harry Shillington	0	0	1	0	0	0	0	0	0	0	0	1
2	4	DF	(Germany)	Philipp Ziereis	2	1	0	2	0	0	0	0	0	4	1	0
2	3	DF	(Australia)	Jason Davidson	2	0	0	2	0	0	0	0	0	4	0	0
2	10	MF	(Australia)	Denis Genreau	3	0	0	1	0	0	0	0	0	4	0	0
4	6	MF	(Australia)	Louis D'Arrigo	2	0	0	1	0	0	0	0	0	3	0	0
6	8	MF	(Australia)	Jordi Valadon	1	0	0	1	0	0	0	0	0	2	0	0
6	16	DF	(Australia)	Joshua Inserra	0	0	0	1	0	0	1	0	0	2	0	0
8	5	DF	(Australia)	Brendan Hamill	1	0	0	0	0	0	0	0	0	1	0	0
8	11	FW	(Brazil)	Clarismario Santos	1	0	0	0	0	0	0	0	0	1	0	0
8	23	MF	(Australia)	Keegan Jelacic	0	0	0	1	0	0	0	0	0	1	0	0
8	25	GK	(Australia)	Jack Duncan	0	0	0	1	0	0	0	0	0	1	0	0
8	29	FW	(Australia)	Mikey Ghossaini	0	0	0	1	0	0	0	0	0	1	0	0
8	44	FW	(Japan)	Charles Nduka	1	0	0	0	0	0	0	0	0	1	0	0
Total					13	1	1	11	0	0	1	0	0	25	1	1

=== Clean sheets ===
Includes all competitions. The list is sorted by squad number when total clean sheets are equal. Numbers in parentheses represent games where both goalkeepers participated and both kept a clean sheet; the number in parentheses is awarded to the goalkeeper who was substituted on, whilst a full clean sheet is awarded to the goalkeeper who was on the field at the start of play. Goalkeepers with no clean sheets not included in the list.

As of 21 November 2026

Rank	No.	Nat.	Goalkeeper	A-League Men	Australia Cup	AFC Champions League Two	Total
1	25	(Australia)	Jack Duncan	0	3	1	4
Total				0	3	1	4

== See also ==
- 2026–27 Melbourne Victory FC (women) season
