= Joshua Inserra =

Australian soccer player (born 2005)

- Inserra playing for Melbourne Victory in 2026.

Personal information
- Full name: Joshua Inserra
- Date of birth: 21 January 2005 (age 21)
- Place of birth: Melbourne, Victoria, Australia
- Height: 1.79 m (5 ft 10 in)
- Position: Right back

Team information
- Current team: Melbourne Victory
- Number: 16

Youth career
- Fawkner
- 2019–2021: Melbourne City
- 2021–: Melbourne Victory

Senior career*
Years	Team	Apps	(Gls)
2023–	Melbourne Victory NPL	31	(0)
2023–	Melbourne Victory	21	(0)

International career^{‡}
2023–2025	Australia U20	16	(0)
2026–	Australia U23	1	(0)
Medal record
Men's football
Representing Australia
AFC U-20 Asian Cup
Winner	2025 China	Team
- * Club domestic league appearances and goals as of 7 March 2026 ‡ National team caps and goals as of 5 October 2025

Joshua Inserra (Italian: [inˈsɛrra]; born 21 January 2005) is an Australian professional soccer player who currently plays as a right back for A-League club Melbourne Victory.

== Club career ==
Inserra playing for Melbourne Victory in October 2026.

=== Youth career ===
Inserra commenced his youth career at local club Fawkner, before joining Melbourne City for the 2019 season. Whilst at city, Inserra played for the club's under 15's, 16's, 17's, 18's & 19's respectively until the conclusion of the 2021 season.

Before the commencement of the 2022 season, Inserra joined Melbourne Victory where he would play for the club's under 18's & 21's squads. For the 2023 season, Inserra was elevated into the senior (under 23's) squad where he would make fifteen appearances, helping the squad earn promotion from National Premier Leagues 3 to the Victorian Premier League (VPL).

Despite signing a three year senior scholarship contract with the A-League Men's squad during the 2023 Victorian season, Inserra would make another thirteen appearances for the VPL squad in the 2024 season. Inserra's last appearance for the squad of the season was in the second last round in a 4–0 win over Kingston City, securing the VPL premiership and promotion to the National Premier Leagues Victoria for the 2025 season.

=== Senior career ===
Inserra made his senior & starting debut in the 2023 A-League Men play-offs of the Australia Cup on 17 July 2023 against Newcastle Jets. Whilst still regularly featuring for the NPL/VPL squad during the 2023 & 2024 Victorian league seasons, Inserra made his A-League Men debut and only appearance for the 2023–24 season on 3 December 2023 at Industree Group Stadium against Central Coast Mariners, replacing injured teammate Nishan Velupillay at the 77th minute, finishing in a 2–2 draw.

The 2024–25 season saw Inserra make a total of nine appearances between both the league and the final series, under coach Arthur Diles. With the appearances coming later in the league season, Inserra featured in four of the five finals series matches played by the Victory, including the Grand Final where he was substituted for injured defender Lachlan Jackson.

== Career statistics ==
As of 17 February 2026

Appearances and goals by club, season and competition
Club	Season	League			National Cup (Note: Includes Australia Cup)		Continental		Other (Note: Includes A-League Men Finals series)		Total	
Club	Season	Division	Apps	Goals	Apps	Goals	Apps	Goals	Apps	Goals	Apps	Goals
Melbourne Victory NPL	2023	NPL Victoria 3	15	0	—		—		—		15	0
Melbourne Victory NPL	2024	Victorian Premier League 1	13	0	—		—		—		13	0
Melbourne Victory NPL	2025	NPL Victoria	2	0	—		—		—		2	0
Melbourne Victory NPL	2026	Victorian Premier League 1	1	0	—		—		—		1	0
Melbourne Victory NPL	Total		31	0	0	0	0	0	0	0	31	0
Melbourne Victory	2022–23	A-League Men	—		1	0	—		—		1	0
Melbourne Victory	2023–24	A-League Men	1	0	0	0	—		0	0	1	0
Melbourne Victory	2024–25	A-League Men	5	0	1	0	—		4	0	10	0
Melbourne Victory	2025–26	A-League Men	10	0	0	0	—		0	0	10	0
Melbourne Victory	Total		16	0	2	0	0	0	4	0	22	0
Career Total			47	0	2	0	0	0	4	0	53	0

== Honours ==
Australia U-20

- AFC U-20 Asian Cup Champions: 2025

Melbourne Victory

- A-League Finals Runner-up: 2025

Melbourne Victory NPL

- NPL Victoria 3 Runner-up: 2023
- Victorian Premier League 1 Champions: 2024
