= Kayne Razmovski =

Australian soccer player

Personal information
- Full name: Kayne David Razmovski
- Date of birth: 10 January 2005 (age 21)
- Place of birth: Australia
- Height: 1.84 m (6 ft 0 in)
- Position: Defender

Team information
- Current team: Heidelberg United
- Number: 14

Youth career
- 2016–2017: Sunshine George Cross
- 2017: Altona City
- 2018–: Melbourne Victory

Senior career*
Years	Team	Apps	(Gls)
2022–2026	Melbourne Victory NPL/VPL	62	(1)
2025–2026	Melbourne Victory	1	(0)
2026–	Heidelberg United	1	(0)

International career^{‡}
2024	Australia U20	4	(0)
- * Club domestic league appearances and goals as of 17 July 2026 ‡ National team caps and goals as of 16 March 2026

Kayne David Razmovski (Macedonian: Кејни Размовски; born 10 January 2005) is an Australian professional soccer player who plays as a right-back for Heidelberg United in the NPL Victoria.

== Club career ==
=== Melbourne Victory ===
Razmovski joined Melbourne Victory’s academy in 2018 at age 13, progressing through the club’s NPL pathway. He made his first‑team debut in the Australia Cup during the 2023 campaign, appearing in the qualifier against Newcastle Jets. Ahead of the 2025–26 season he was rewarded with a professional contract and promoted to the senior squad. Before joining the Victory, Razmovski had played youth football for Sunshine George Cross and Altona City.

He made his A‑League Men debut on 10 January 2026 as a late substitute against Western Sydney Wanderers.

=== Heidelberg United ===
On 11 July 2026 Heidelberg United would announce the signing of Kayne Razmovski.

== International career ==
Razmovski has represented Australia at under‑20 level. He received his first call‑up to the Australia U20 squad in May 2024 for a South American tour featuring fixtures against Uruguay and Chile, was selected for the Panda Cup in China in November 2024, and was among those noted as participating in the 2025 AFC U-20 Asian Cup qualifying later in 2024.

== Career statistics ==
As of 13 July 2026

Appearances and goals by club, season and competition
Club	Season	League			National Cup		Continental		Other		Total	
Club	Season	Division	Apps	Goals	Apps	Goals	Apps	Goals	Apps	Goals	Apps	Goals
Melbourne Victory NPL/VPL	2022	NPL Victoria 3	7	0	—		—		1 (Note: Includes Football Victoria NPL Playoff Series)	0	8	0
Melbourne Victory NPL/VPL	2023	NPL Victoria 3	11	0	—		—		—		11	0
Melbourne Victory NPL/VPL	2024	Victorian Premier League 1	23	1	—		—		—		23	1
Melbourne Victory NPL/VPL	2025	NPL Victoria	15	0	—		—		—		15	0
Melbourne Victory NPL/VPL	2026	Victorian Premier League 1	5	0	—		—		—		5	0
Melbourne Victory NPL/VPL	Melbourne Victory NPL/VPL Total		61	0	0	0	0	0	1	0	62	1
Melbourne Victory	2023–24	A-League Men	—		1 (Note: Includes Australia Cup)	0	—		—		1	0
Melbourne Victory	2024–25	A-League Men	0	0	0	0	—		0	0	0	0
Melbourne Victory	2025–26	A-League Men	1	0	0	0	—		0	0	1	0
Melbourne Victory	Melbourne Victory Total		1	0	1	0	0	0	0	0	2	0
Heidelberg United	2026	NPL Victoria	0	0	0	0	0	0	0	0	0	0
Career Total			62	0	1	0	0	0	1	0	64	1

== Personal life ==
Razmovski is of Macedonian heritage, and attended Geelong Grammar School where he captained the school's first XI side and graduated in 2022.
