= Oliver Dragicevic =

Australian footballer (born 2007)

Personal information
- Date of birth: 10 October 2007 (age 19)
- Place of birth: Melbourne, Victoria, Australia
- Position: Midfielder

Team information
- Current team: Melbourne Victory
- Number: 19

Youth career
- 2019–2023: St Albans Dinamo
- 2023–2024: Melbourne City
- 2024–2025: St Albans Dinamo

Senior career*
Years	Team	Apps	(Gls)
2024	Melbourne City NPL	3	(0)
2024–2025	St Albans Dinamo	30	(3)
2025–	Melbourne Victory	7	(0)
- * Club domestic league appearances and goals as of 2 January 2026

Oliver Dragicevic (born 10 October 2007) is an Australian professional footballer who plays as a midfielder for Melbourne Victory in the A-League Men.

== Early life ==
Dragicevic was born in Melbourne to a Croatian Australian family, and grew up in the city's western suburbs. He graduated from Williamstown High School in 2025, having led the school’s senior soccer team to become State Champions in 2024, whilst playing combined youth & senior football for St Albans Dinamo during the 2025 season of NPL Victoria.

During his development with St Albans, then assistant coach and A-League Champion Tom Pondeljak, was cited as an influential mentor, alongside Dragicevic's father Ilija, who then served and continues to serve as president of Dinamo.

== Club career ==
=== Melbourne City (2023–2024) ===
Following four years of competitive youth football with St Albans, Dragicevic was signed by Melbourne City's Youth academy for the 2023 season. From the start of the season to the middle of the 2024 Victoria Premier League 1 season, Dragicevic competed within the Under 16, Under 18, Under 23, and the Senior VPL squads, making a total of three appearances for the Senior squad. In June during the season, Dragicevic was cleared to return to St Albans.

=== St Albans Saints (2024–2025) ===
In the 2025 NPL Victoria season, Dragicevic recorded three goals and three assists in 25 appearances for St Albans, earning the competition's "Goal of the Week" for a curling strike in Round 22.

=== Melbourne Victory (2025–present) ===
Melbourne Victory announced Dragicevic as one of five young talents joining the A-League Men squad ahead of 2025–26, alongside Emre Saglam, Jack Mihailidis, Daniel Lazarevski and Xavier Stella. The club profiled Dragicevic as a highly touted 18-year-old midfielder and confirmed his first-team integration following his NPL breakout. He signed a three-year contract ahead of the season, and made his A-League Men debut in Round 2 against Newcastle Jets on 24 October 2025.

Used primarily as a late substitute, Dragicevic featured in early-season fixtures against Perth Glory, Melbourne City, Macarthur FC, and Adelaide United. By 2 January 2026 he had made six league appearances, all as a substitute.

== Style of play ==
Dragicevic is predominantly a central midfielder, with coaches highlighting his consistency, adaptability and ball-carrying from midfield.

== Career statistics ==
As of 7 January 2026

Appearances and goals by club, season and competition
Club	Season	League			Cup (Note: Includes Australia Cup & Dockerty Cup)		Continental		Other (Note: Includes A-League Men Finals series)		Total	
Club	Season	Division	Apps	Goals	Apps	Goals	Apps	Goals	Apps	Goals	Apps	Goals
Melbourne City VPL	2024	Victorian Premier League 1	3	0	—		—		—		3	0
Melbourne City VPL	Melbourne City NPL/VPL Total		3	0	0	0	0	0	0	0	3	0
St Albans Dinamo	2024	NPL Victoria	5	0	—		—		—		5	0
St Albans Dinamo	2025	NPL Victoria	25	3	1	0	—		—		26	3
St Albans Dinamo	St Albans Dinamo Total		30	3	1	0	0	0	0	0	31	3
Melbourne Victory	2025–26	A-League Men	6	0	—		—		0	0	6	0
Melbourne Victory	Melbourne Victory Total		6	0	0	0	0	0	0	0	6	0
Career Total			39	3	1	0	0	0	0	0	40	3
