= 2025–26 Melbourne Victory FC season =

Melbourne Victory
2025–26 season
- Chairman: John Dovaston
- Head Coach: Arthur Diles
- Stadium: AAMI Park
- A-League Men: 4th
- A-League Men finals series: Elimination-final
- Australia Cup: Round of 32
- Top goalscorer: League: Nikos Vergos (7); All: Nikos Vergos (7)
- Highest home attendance: 18,319 vs. Melbourne City (8 November 2025); A League Men
- Lowest home attendance: 6,012 vs. Macarthur FC (15 March 2026); A League Men
- Average home league attendance: 11,212
- Biggest win: 5–1 vs. Wellington Phoenix (H) (29 December 2025); A-League Men; 4–0 vs. Sydney FC (H) (26 January 2026)
- Biggest defeat: 2–5 vs. Newcastle Jets (A) (24 October 2025); A-League Men; 0–3 vs. Sydney FC (A) (22 November 2025); A-League Men
Home colours	Away colours
- All statistics correct as of 2 May 2026.

The 2025–26 season was Melbourne Victory Football Club's 21st season in the A-League Men. In addition to the domestic league, Melbourne Victory participated in this season's edition of the Australia Cup.

== Players ==
=== First-team squad ===
Note: Flags indicate national team as defined under FIFA eligibility rules; some limited exceptions apply. Players may hold more than one non-FIFA nationality.

No.	Pos.	Nation	Player
2	DF	AUS	Jason Davidson
3	DF	CIV	Adama Traoré
4	DF	AUS	Lachlan Jackson
5	DF	AUS	Brendan Hamill
7	MF	AUS	Reno Piscopo
8	MF	AUS	Jordi Valadon
9	FW	GRE	Nikos Vergos
10	MF	AUS	Denis Genreau
11	FW	BRA	Santos
14	MF	AUS	Matthew Grimaldi
15	DF	AUS	Sebastian Esposito (on loan from Lecce)
16	DF	AUS	Joshua Inserra (scholarship)
17	FW	AUS	Nishan Velupillay
18	DF	AUS	Franco Lino (on loan from Viking)
19	FW	AUS	Jing Reec

No.	Pos.	Nation	Player
21	DF	POR	Roderick Miranda (captain)
22	DF	AUS	Joshua Rawlins
23	MF	AUS	Keegan Jelacic
24	MF	AUS	Emre Sağlam (on loan from Gençlerbirliği)
25	GK	AUS	Jack Duncan
27	MF	AUS	Louis D'Arrigo
28	DF	AUS	Kayne Razmovski
29	MF	AUS	Oliver Dragicevic
30	GK	AUS	Daniel Graskoski (scholarship)
31	FW	AUS	Daniel Lazarevski
33	MF	AUS	Jack Mihailidis
34	MF	AUS	Xavier Stella
40	GK	AUS	Jack Warshawsky
44	FW	JPN	Charles Nduka
64	MF	ESP	Juan Mata

== Transfers and contracts ==
=== Transfers in ===
No.	Position	Player	Transferred from	Type/fee	Contract length	Date	Ref.
27	MF	Louis D'Arrigo	(Poland) Lechia Gdańsk	Free transfer	2 years	1 July 2025	
23	MF	Keegan Jelacic	(Belgium) Gent	Free transfer	2 years	1 July 2025	
18	DF	Franco Lino	(Norway) Viking	Loan	1 year	3 July 2025	
15	DF	Sebastian Esposito	(Italy) Lecce	Loan	1 year	11 August 2025	
2	DF	Jason Davidson	(Greece) Panserraikos	Free transfer	2 years	13 August 2025	
24	MF	Emre Sağlam	(Turkey) Gençlerbirliği	Loan	1 year	30 August 2025	
29	MF	Oliver Dragicevic	(Australia) St Albans Dinamo	Free transfer	3 years	30 August 2025	
34	MF	Xavier Stella	Melbourne City FC NPL	Free transfer	3 years	30 August 2025	
10	MF	Denis Genreau	(Spain) Deportivo La Coruña	Free transfer	3 years	8 September 2025	
40	GK	Jack Warshawsky	(Australia) Oakleigh Cannons	Free transfer	1 year	9 September 2025	
14	MF	Matthew Grimaldi	Unattached	Free transfer	1 year	13 September 2025	
64	MF	(Spain) Juan Mata	Western Sydney Wanderers	Free transfer	1 year	16 September 2025	
44	FW	(Japan) Charles Nduka	(Japan) Kagoshima United	Free transfer	6 months	14 January 2026	

==== From youth squad ====
No.	Position	Player	Age	Notes	Ref
28	DF	Kayne Razmovski	20	1-year contract	
33	MF	Jack Mihailidis	18	1-year contract	
31	FW	Daniel Lazarevski	19	1-year contract	

=== Transfers out ===
No.	Position	Player	Transferred to	Type/fee	Date	Ref
28	DF	Kasey Bos	(Germany) Mainz 05	Undisclosed fee	13 June 2025	
7	FW	Daniel Arzani	(Hungary) Ferencváros	End of contract	13 June 2025	
18	MF	Fabian Monge	(Australia) APIA Leichhardt	End of contract	28 June 2025	
40	GK	Christian Siciliano	(Australia) Caroline Springs George Cross	End of contract	28 June 2025	
23	FW	Alexander Badolato	Western Sydney Wanderers	End of loan	30 June 2025	
24	MF	Alexander Menelaou	(Australia) South Melbourne	End of contract	30 June 2025	
10	FW	Bruno Fornaroli	Retired		30 June 2025	
6	MF	Ryan Teague	(Belgium) Mechelen	Undisclosed	1 July 2025	
1	GK	Mitchell Langerak	Retired		10 July 2025	
10	MF	(France) Zinédine Machach	Unattached	Mutual contract termination	8 August 2025	
26	MF	Luka Kolić	(Australia) Melbourne Knights	Mutual contract termination	31 December 2025	

=== Contract extensions ===
No.	Position	Player	Duration	Date	Notes	Ref
25	Goalkeeper	Jack Duncan	1 year	9 July 2024	Contract extension triggered	
11	Winger	(Brazil) Clarismario Santos	2 years	18 June 2025		
3	Left-back	(Ivory Coast) Adama Traoré	1 year	8 July 2025		
21	Centre-back	(Portugal) Roderick Miranda	1 year	8 July 2025	Contract extension triggered	
26	Attacking midfielder	Luka Kolić	1 year	23 July 2025	Promoted to full contract	
16	Right-back	Joshua Inserra	2 years	19 September 2025	Contract extended from end of 2025–26 to end of 2027–28	
30	Goalkeeper	Daniel Graskoski	3 years	19 September 2025	Promoted to full contract	

== Pre-season and friendlies ==
Win Draw Loss

11 July 2025	Melbourne Victory (Australia)	0–3	(Wales) Wrexham	Melbourne
19:30 AEST		Report	O'Connor 43'; Hardie 66'; Evans 78'	Stadium: Docklands Stadium; Attendance: 37,020

15 July 2025	Caroline Springs George Cross (Australia)	1–1	(Australia) Melbourne Victory	Melbourne
19:00 AEST	Whiteley 6'	Report	Jelacic 40'	Stadium: DEKA Park City Vista Pavilion & Sports Field

9 August 2025	Hume City (Australia)	0–5	(Australia) Melbourne Victory	Melbourne
13:00 AEST		Report	D'Arrigo 21'; Santos 44', 51'; Vergos 58'; Stella 81'	Stadium: Nasiol Stadium

19 August 2025	Oakleigh Cannons (Australia)	1–0	(Australia) Melbourne Victory	Melbourne
20:15 AEST		Report		Stadium: Jack Edwards Reserve

27 August 2025	Northcote City (Australia)	1–3	(Australia) Melbourne Victory	Melbourne
19:30 AEST	Webb 10'	Report	Traoré 1', 11'; Inserra 7'	Stadium: John Cain Memorial Park

5 September 2025	Melbourne Victory (Australia)	1–2	(Australia) Adelaide United	Melbourne
	Vergos 50'	Report	Vriends 45'; Goodwin 60'	Stadium: The Home of the Matildas; Attendance: 0 (behind closed doors)

21 September 2025	Perth Glory (Australia)	0–1	(Australia) Melbourne Victory	Mandurah
15:00 AWST		Report	Valadon 47'	Stadium: Peelwood Reserve; Attendance: 2,000+ Referee: Shane Skinner

24 September 2025	Perth Glory (Australia)	0–3	(Australia) Melbourne Victory	Bunbury
18:30 AWST		Report	Reec 19'; Grimaldi 54'; Dragicevic 90'	Stadium: Hay Park

4 October 2025	Melbourne Victory (Australia)	3–0	(Australia) Adelaide United	Mildura
17:30 AEST	Razmovski 2'; Vergos 10'; Jelacic 16'	Report		Stadium: Mildura Sporting Precinct

== Competitions ==
=== Overall record ===
Competition	First match	Last match	Starting round	Final position	Record							
Competition	First match	Last match	Starting round	Final position	Pld	W	D	L	GF	GA	GD	Win %
A-League Men	18 October 2025	25 April 2026	Matchday 1	4th	26	11	7	8	44	33	+11	42.31
A-League Men finals series	2 May 2026	2 May 2026	Elimination-final	Elimination-final	1	0	0	1	0	1	−1	0.00
Australia Cup	29 July 2025	29 July 2025	Round of 32	Round of 32	1	0	0	1	3	4	−1	0.00
Total					28	11	7	10	47	38	+9	39.29

Last updated: 2 May 2026
Source: Competitions

=== A-League Men ===
==== League table ====
Pos	Team	Pld	W	D	L	GF	GA	GD	Pts	Qualification
2	Adelaide United	26	12	7	7	46	36	+10	43	Qualification for the AFC Champions League Elite preliminary stage and the finals series
3	Auckland FC (Note: Auckland FC and Wellington Phoenix cannot qualify for Asian Football Confederation competitions as they are based in New Zealand, which is part of the Oceania Football Confederation.) (C)	26	11	9	6	42	29	+13	42	Qualification for the finals series (Note: The top two teams enter the finals series at the semi-finals, while the teams ranked third to sixth enter the finals series at the elimination-finals.)
4	Melbourne Victory	26	11	7	8	44	33	+11	40	Qualification for the AFC Champions League Two group stage and the finals series (Note: Since the 2025 Australia Cup winners, Newcastle Jets, occupy an AFC Champions League Elite position, the AFC Champions League Two spot goes to the next eligible team. The AFC ruled that the Australia Cup runner-up Heidelberg United was ineligible to compete.)
5	Sydney FC	26	11	6	9	33	25	+8	39	Qualification for the finals series
6	Melbourne City	26	10	8	8	33	33	0	38	Qualification for the finals series

Source: A-Leagues
Rules for classification: 1) points; 2) goal difference; 3) goals scored; 4) wins; 5) head-to-head results; 5a) head-to-head points; 5b) head-to-head goal difference; 6) Fair Play points; 7) away goal difference; 8) away goals per match; 9) home goal difference; 10) home goals per match; 11) toss of a coin in an event of a tie of two clubs.
(C) Champions

==== Results summary ====
Overall								Home						Away					
Pld	W	D	L	GF	GA	GD	Pts	W	D	L	GF	GA	GD	W	D	L	GF	GA	GD
26	11	7	8	43	33	+10	40	6	4	3	25	14	+11	5	3	5	18	19	−1

Last updated: 25 April 2026.
Source: Ultimate A-League

==== Results by round ====
Round	1	2	3	4	5	6	7	8	9	10	11	12	13	14	15	16	17	18	19	20	21	22	23	24	25	26
Ground	H	A	A	H	A	A	A	H	A	H	H	H	A	H	A	A	H	A	H	A	H	H	H	A	H	A
Result	D	L	W	L	L	L	D	W	W	W	W	L	L	W	L	W	D	W	D	D	W	W	L	D	D	W
Position	8	11	7	9	10	12	12	12	9	6	5	7	9	7	8	5	6	5	5	5	4	3	4	5	6	4
Points	1	1	4	4	4	4	5	8	11	14	17	17	17	20	20	23	24	27	28	29	32	35	35	36	37	40

Updated to match(es) played on 25 April 2026. Source: Ultimate A-League
A = Away; H = Home; N = Neutral; B = Bye; W = Win; D = Draw; L = Loss; X = Bye

==== Matches ====
Fixtures released on 11 September 2025.

Win Draw Loss Fixtures

18 October 2025 1	Melbourne Victory	0–0	Auckland FC	Melbourne
19:35 AEDT		Report		Stadium: AAMI Park; Attendance: 11,558; Referee: Daniel Elder

24 October 2025 2	Newcastle Jets	5–2	Melbourne Victory	Newcastle
19:35 AEDT	Gibson 14'; Badolato 20', 45+1', 79'; Fryer 90+2'	Report	Genreau 25'; Jelacic 55'	Stadium: McDonald Jones Stadium; Attendance: 6,137; Referee: Adam Kersey

31 October 2025 3	Perth Glory	0–2	Melbourne Victory	Perth
21:35 AEDT		Report	Jelacic 11'; Mata 54'	Stadium: HBF Park; Attendance: 5,295; Referee: Shaun Evans

8 November 2025 4	Melbourne Victory	0–2	Melbourne City	Melbourne
19:35 AEDT		Report	Caputo 2'; Antoniou 55'	Stadium: AAMI Park; Attendance: 18,319; Referee: Alex King

22 November 2025 5	Sydney FC	3–0	Melbourne Victory	Sydney
19:35 AEDT	Lolley 58', 70'; A. Grant 76'	Report		Stadium: Leichhardt Oval; Attendance: 10,916; Referee: Alex King

28 November 2025 6	Brisbane Roar	1–0	Melbourne Victory	Brisbane
19:35 AEDT	Klein 3'	Report		Stadium: Suncorp Stadium; Attendance: 8,218; Referee: Shaun Evans

5 December 2025 7	Macarthur FC	0–0	Melbourne Victory	Sydney
19:35 AEDT		Report		Stadium: Campbelltown Sports Stadium; Attendance: 3,046; Referee: Alex King

13 December 2025 8	Melbourne Victory	2–1	Adelaide United	Melbourne
19:35 AEDT	Vergos 24', 46'	Report	Pierias 86'	Stadium: AAMI Park; Attendance: 9,103; Referee: Shaun Evans

20 December 2025 9	Melbourne City	0–1	Melbourne Victory	Melbourne
19:35 AEDT		Report	Grimaldi 90+1'	Stadium: AAMI Park; Attendance: 17,619; Referee: Alireza Faghani

29 December 2025 10	Melbourne Victory	5–1	Wellington Phoenix	Melbourne
19:00 AEDT	Vergos 7', 42', 47'; Santos 55'; Jelacic 90'	Report	Najjarine 29'	Stadium: AAMI Park; Attendance: 10,769; Referee: Shaun Evans

2 January 2026 11	Melbourne Victory	3–2	Perth Glory	Melbourne
19:35 AEDT	D'Arrigo 45+5'; Velupillay 53'; Santos 69'	Report	Ostler 12'; Ngo 79'	Stadium: AAMI Park; Attendance: 10,533; Referee: Casey Reibelt

10 January 2026 12	Melbourne Victory	0–1	Western Sydney Wanderers	Melbourne
19:35 AEDT		Report	Barbarouses 29' (pen.)	Stadium: AAMI Park; Attendance: 12,502; Referee: Daniel Elder

17 January 2026 13	Adelaide United	2–1	Melbourne Victory	Adelaide
19:35 AEDT	Goodwin 6'; Kitto 90+7'	Report	Grimaldi 75'	Stadium: Coopers Stadium; Attendance: 14,784; Referee: Lachlan Keevers

26 January 2026 14	Melbourne Victory	4–0	Sydney FC	Melbourne
17:40 AEDT	Santos 53', 64'; Jelacic 79'; Jackson 82'	Report		Stadium: AAMI Park; Attendance: 14,816; Referee: Daniel Elder

1 February 2026 15	Central Coast Mariners	1–0	Melbourne Victory	Gosford
17:00 AEDT	Auglah 35'	Report		Stadium: Polytec Stadium; Attendance: 3,865; Referee: Tim Danaskos

6 February 2026 16	Wellington Phoenix	2–3	Melbourne Victory	Wellington
17:00 AEDT	Armiento 39'; Miranda 84' (o.g.)	Report	Esposito 10'; Velupillay 44'; D'Arrigo 77'	Stadium: Sky Stadium; Attendance: 5,783; Referee: Jack Morgan

14 February 2026 17	Melbourne Victory	1–1	Brisbane Roar	Melbourne
17:00 AEDT	Nduka 13'	Report	D'Agostino 76'	Stadium: AAMI Park; Attendance: 11,163; Referee: Shaun Evans

21 February 2026 18	Melbourne City	1–3	Melbourne Victory	Melbourne
19:35 AEDT	Caputo 32'	Report	Mata 20', 64'; Santos 89'	Stadium: AAMI Park; Attendance: 21,439; Referee: Daniel Elder

27 February 2026 19	Melbourne Victory	1–1	Adelaide United	Melbourne
19:35 AEDT	Jelacic 26'	Report	Dukuly 35'	Stadium: AAMI Park; Attendance: 11,506; Referee: Alex King

7 March 2026 20	Sydney FC	2–2	Melbourne Victory	Sydney
19:35 AEDT	Stamatelopoulos 73'; Arslan 75'	Report	Mata 34'; Nduka 69'	Stadium: Allianz Stadium; Attendance: 15,071; Referee: Lachlan Keevers

15 March 2026 21	Melbourne Victory	4–1	Macarthur FC	Melbourne
19:00 AEDT	Da Silva 11' (o.g.); Genreau 25'; Esposito 63'; Nduka 66'	Report	Vickery 37'	Stadium: AAMI Park; Attendance: 6,012; Referee: Shaun Evans

21 March 2026 22	Melbourne Victory	4–1	Central Coast Mariners	Melbourne
17:00 AEDT	Velupillay 50'; Mata 54'; Vergos 90+1'; Davidson 90+4'	Report	Ngor 7'	Stadium: AAMI Park; Attendance: 9,506; Referee: Alex King

5 April 2026 23	Melbourne Victory	0–1	Wellington Phoenix	Melbourne
15:00 AEST		Report	Kartum 89'	Stadium: AAMI Park; Attendance: 8,762; Referee: Nathan Shakespear

11 April 2026 24	Auckland FC	2–2	Melbourne Victory	Auckland
15:00 AEDT	Cosgrove 45+4'; Brook 82'	Report	Lino 23'; Velupillay 53'	Stadium: Go Media Stadium; Attendance: 10,077; Referee: Lachlan Keevers

17 April 2026 25	Melbourne Victory	2–2	Newcastle Jets	Melbourne
19:35 AEST	Nduka 31', 34'	Report	Adams 19', 89' (pen.)	Stadium: AAMI Park; Attendance: 8,762; Referee: Alex King

25 April 2026 26	Western Sydney Wanderers	0–2	Melbourne Victory	Sydney
19:35 AEDT		Report	Santos 71'; Vergos 90+2'	Stadium: CommBank Stadium; Attendance: 7,437; Referee: Daniel Elder

==== Finals series ====
2 May 2026 Elimination final	Melbourne Victory	0–1	Sydney FC	Melbourne
19:40 AEST		Report	Wood 80'	Stadium: AAMI Park; Attendance: 15,258; Referee: Lachlan Keevers

=== Australia Cup ===
29 July 2025 Round of 32	Olympic Kingsway	4–3 (a.e.t.)	Melbourne Victory	Perth
21:00 AEST	Oxborrow 27' (pen.); Hobson 70'; Boland 90+3' (pen.), 101'	Report	Valadon 23'; Jelacic 45+1'; Piscopo 88'	Stadium: Kingsway Reserve; Attendance: 3,033; Referee: Sam Kelly

== Statistics ==
=== Appearances and goals ===
Includes all competitions. Players with no appearances not included in the list.

As of 2 May 2026

No.	Pos.	Nat.	Name	A-League Men		A-League Men finals series		Australia Cup		Total	
No.	Pos.	Nat.	Name	Apps	Goals	Apps	Goals	Apps	Goals	Apps	Goals
2	DF	(Australia)	Jason Davidson	21+2	1	1	0	0	0	24	1
3	DF	(Ivory Coast)	Adama Traoré	2+4	0	0	0	1	0	7	0
4	DF	(Australia)	Lachlan Jackson	8+2	1	0	0	1	0	11	1
5	DF	(Australia)	Brendan Hamill	0+1	0	0	0	0	0	0	1
7	MF	(Australia)	Reno Piscopo	1+8	0	0+1	0	0+1	1	11	1
8	MF	(Australia)	Jordi Valadon	20+3	0	1	0	1	1	25	1
9	FW	(Greece)	Nikos Vergos	14+10	7	0+1	0	1	0	26	7
10	MF	(Australia)	Denis Genreau	21+3	2	1	0	0	0	25	2
11	FW	(Brazil)	Santos	14+10	6	1	0	1	0	26	6
14	MF	(Australia)	Matthew Grimaldi	8+18	2	0+1	0	0	0	27	2
15	DF	(Australia)	Sebastian Esposito	22+2	2	0	0	0	0	24	2
16	DF	(Australia)	Joshua Inserra	9+2	0	0	0	1	0	12	0
17	FW	(Australia)	Nishan Velupillay	17+4	4	1	0	0	0	22	4
18	DF	(Australia)	Franco Lino	5	1	1	0	0	0	6	1
19	FW	(Australia)	Jing Reec	3+13	0	0	0	0+1	0	17	0
21	DF	(Portugal)	Roderick Miranda	19	0	1	0	1	0	21	0
22	DF	(Australia)	Joshua Rawlins	18+3	0	1	0	0+1	0	23	0
23	MF	(Australia)	Keegan Jelacic	15+11	5	0+1	0	1	1	28	6
25	GK	(Australia)	Jack Duncan	11	0	0	0	1	0	12	0
27	MF	(Australia)	Louis D'Arrigo	11+5	2	0+1	0	1	0	18	2
28	MF	(Australia)	Kayne Razmovski	0+1	0	0	0	0	0	1	0
29	MF	(Australia)	Oliver Dragicevic	0+7	0	0	0	0	0	7	0
34	MF	(Australia)	Xavier Stella	3+6	0	0	0	0	0	9	0
34	DF	(Australia)	John Radimisis	0	0	0	0	0+1	0	1	0
39	FW	(Australia)	Alex Lee	0	0	0	0	0+1	0	1	0
40	GK	(Australia)	Jack Warshawsky	15	0	1	0	0	0	16	0
44	FW	(Japan)	Charles Nduka	9+3	5	1	0	0	0	13	5
64	MF	(Spain)	Juan Mata	20+4	5	1	0	0	0	25	5
Player(s) transferred out but featured this season
10	MF	(France)	Zinédine Machach	0	0	0	0	1	0	1	0
26	MF	(Australia)	Luka Kolić	0	0	0	0	0+1	0	1	0

=== Disciplinary record ===
Includes all competitions. The list is sorted by squad number when total cards are equal. Players with no cards not included in the list.

As of 2 May 2026

Rank	No.	Pos.	Nat.	Name	A-League Men			A-League Men finals series			Australia Cup			Total		
Rank	No.	Pos.	Nat.	Name	Booked	(yellow card) (yellow-red card)	Sent off (straight red)	Booked	(yellow card) (yellow-red card)	Sent off (straight red)	Booked	(yellow card) (yellow-red card)	Sent off (straight red)	Booked	(yellow card) (yellow-red card)	Sent off (straight red)
1	10	MF	(Australia)	Denis Genreau	4	0	1	0	0	0	0	0	0	4	0	1
2	22	DF	(Australia)	Josh Rawlins	0	0	0	0	0	0	0	0	1	0	0	1
3	2	DF	(Australia)	Jason Davidson	7	0	0	0	0	0	0	0	0	7	0	0
4	21	DF	(Portugal)	Roderick Miranda	4	0	0	0	0	0	1	0	0	5	0	0
5	8	MF	(Australia)	Jordi Valadon	4	0	0	0	0	0	0	0	0	4	0	0
5	9	FW	(Greece)	Nikos Vergos	4	0	0	0	0	0	0	0	0	4	0	0
7	3	DF	(Ivory Coast)	Adama Traoré	2	0	0	0	0	0	1	0	0	3	0	0
7	4	DF	(Australia)	Lachlan Jackson	2	0	0	0	0	0	1	0	0	3	0	0
7	15	DF	(Australia)	Sebastian Esposito	3	0	0	0	0	0	0	0	0	3	0	0
7	22	DF	(Australia)	Joshua Rawlins	3	0	0	0	0	0	0	0	0	3	0	0
11	11	FW	(Brazil)	Santos	2	0	0	0	0	0	0	0	0	2	0	0
11	23	MF	(Australia)	Keegan Jelacic	2	0	0	0	0	0	0	0	0	2	0	0
11	27	MF	(Australia)	Louis D'Arrigo	1	0	0	0	0	0	1	0	0	2	0	0
11	44	FW	(Japan)	Charles Nduka	2	0	0	0	0	0	0	0	0	2	0	0
11	64	MF	(Spain)	Juan Mata	2	0	0	0	0	0	0	0	0	2	0	0
16	14	MF	(Australia)	Matthew Grimaldi	1	0	0	0	0	0	0	0	0	1	0	0
16	16	DF	(Australia)	Joshua Inserra	1	0	0	0	0	0	0	0	0	1	0	0
16	17	FW	(Australia)	Nishan Velupillay	1	0	0	0	0	0	0	0	0	1	0	0
16	19	FW	(Australia)	Jing Reec	1	0	0	0	0	0	0	0	0	1	0	0
Total					46	0	1	0	0	0	4	0	1	50	0	2

=== Clean sheets ===
Includes all competitions. The list is sorted by squad number when total clean sheets are equal. Numbers in parentheses represent games where both goalkeepers participated and both kept a clean sheet; the number in parentheses is awarded to the goalkeeper who was substituted on, whilst a full clean sheet is awarded to the goalkeeper who was on the field at the start of play. Goalkeepers with no clean sheets not included in the list.

As of 2 May 2026

Rank	No.	Nat.	Goalkeeper	A-League Men	A-League Men finals series	Australia Cup	Total
1	25	(Australia)	Jack Duncan	4	0	0	4
2	40	(Australia)	Jack Warshawsky	2	0	0	2
Total				6	0	0	6

== See also ==
- 2025–26 Melbourne Victory FC (women) season
