= Scott Miller (soccer, born 1981) =

Australian soccer coach (born 1981)

Personal information
- Date of birth: 27 September 1981 (age 45)
- Place of birth: Melbourne, Victoria, Australia
- Height: 1.85 m (6 ft 1 in)

Managerial career
- Years: Team
- 2007–2015: Fulham (assistant)
- 2013: Australia (assistant)
- 2014–2015: Fulham U23
- 2015–2016: Newcastle Jets
- 2016–2018: Aalborg BK (assistant)
- 2018–2023: Langwarrin
- 2023: Altona Magic
- 2026–: Rimal Al Sahra (assistant)

Scott Miller (born 27 September 1981) is an Australian soccer coach, who has previously worked as the head coach of A-League club Newcastle Jets and has performed assistant coaching roles at Fulham, the Australian national team and Aalborg BK.

== Playing career ==
A youth team product of the Gippsland Falcons, Miller went on to play for clubs Essendon Royals and Fitzroy City before his career was cut short by injuries in his early 20s.

Writing in the Australian Times in 2013, Miller spoke of his playing career, "Having played football in Australia, I wanted to work at the highest level in football, which for me has always been the Premier League."

== Coaching career ==
In 2006, Miller moved to England to further his coaching ambitions, joining Fulham as a fitness coach in 2007. He later appointed assistant technical coach, before going on to serve as the coach of Fulham's U-21 team.

When Ange Postecoglou was appointed head coach of Australia in late 2013, he took on a short-term role as an assistant coach.

After nine seasons with Fulham, in June 2015, Miller was released by the club to pursue other opportunities.

Soon after leaving Fulham, he was linked to the Newcastle Jets head coach role. It was confirmed that he had penned a two-year deal with the club on 18 June. The appointment of Miller made him the youngest head coach in the decade-long history of the A-League at just 33 years of age. Miller was released from his position as head coach before the start of the 2016–17 A-League season.

On 30 November 2016, Miller returned to Europe and joined Danish club Aalborg BK as an assistant coach, on a two-year contract.

In October 2018 Miller joined the Fox Sports Hyundai A League team as a football analyst.

In August 2018, it was announced that Miller would be the head coach of NPL Victoria 2 club Langwarrin SC for the 2019 season, where he would go onto remain Head Coach for 5 seasons and coaching over 100 games.

Miller was appointed as manager of Altona Magic SC in October 2023. However, just three days after his appointment, he resigned due to "rapidly changing personal circumstances".

== Personal life ==
Miller grew up on the Mornington Peninsula.

Miller possesses an AFC Pro Diploma, UEFA A-Licence, and also holds university degrees in sports science and psychology.

== Coaching record ==
As of 19 August 2023

Team	From	To	Record								
Team	From	To	M	W	D	L	GF	GA	GD	Win %	Ref.
Newcastle Jets	18 June 2015	7 September 2016	29	8	6	15	31	41	−10	27.59	
Langwarrin	23 August 2018	1 September 2023	103	54	21	28	171	147	+24	52.43	
