= Denis Genreau =

Australian soccer player (born 1999)

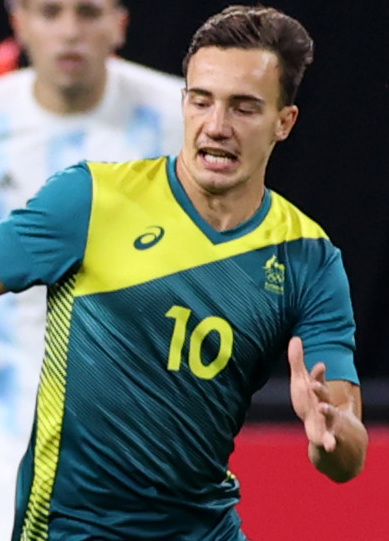
- Genreau playing for Australia U23 in 2021

Personal information
- Date of birth: 21 May 1999 (age 27)
- Place of birth: Paris, France
- Height: 1.75 m (5 ft 9 in)
- Position: Attacking midfielder

Team information
- Current team: Melbourne Victory
- Number: 10

Youth career
- Brighton SC
- 2015–2020: Melbourne City

Senior career*
Years	Team	Apps	(Gls)
2015–2018	Melbourne City NPL	52	(7)
2016–2020	Melbourne City	11	(0)
2018–2019	→ PEC Zwolle (loan)	10	(0)
2020–2021	Macarthur FC	23	(2)
2021–2025	Toulouse	71	(2)
2023–2025	Toulouse II	6	(3)
2025	Deportivo La Coruña	9	(1)
2025–	Melbourne Victory	25	(2)

International career^{‡}
2017–2019	Australia U20	2	(1)
2019	Australia U23	6	(0)
2021–2023	Australia	6	(0)
Medal record
Men's football
Representing Australia
AFC U-23 Asian Cup
Third place	2020 Thailand	U-23 Team
- * Club domestic league appearances and goals as of 28 March 2026 ‡ National team caps and goals as of 15 June 2023

Denis Genreau (French: [də.ni ʒɑ̃.ʁo]; born 21 May 1999) is a professional soccer player who plays as an attacking midfielder for Melbourne Victory. Born in France, Genreau has represented Australia internationally since 2017, and made his national team debut in 2021.

== Early life and personal life ==
Genreau was born in Paris, France, to French parents Sophie and Marc Genreau. Following Denis' birth, they moved with their family to Australia, having fond memories of a honeymoon there. Growing up in the suburb areas of Melbourne, Genreau learnt to speak French from both of his parents who wanted to pass down their French culture. His father had a love for football, showing his son YouTube clips of Zinedine Zidane and watching football on the TV together in the morning. His passion for football would be passed down, as Denis would frequently ask his father to take him to the local Melbourne park to kick the football around.

Denis graduated at Scotch College and was accepted into the Arts degree program at the University of Melbourne.

== Club career ==
=== Melbourne City ===
In 2015, Genreau joined Melbourne City's academy system and went on to captain both the Melbourne City NPL squad and A-League Youth squad. Two years later, on 30 March 2017, he signed his first professional contract with the club, a 3-year scholarship deal that would promote him to the first-team. Genreau would receive his first call up into the A-League squad for the game against Adelaide United in October 2016. On 27 December 2016, Genreau made his senior club debut in a 3–3 home draw match against Perth Glory, coming on as a substitute for Anthony Caceres in the 80th minute. His first professional start for the club came on 11 February 2017 in a 2–2 home draw against Brisbane Roar.

On 29 August 2017, Genreau scored his first senior club goal in a 3–2 win against Hakoah Sydney City East in the Round of 16 of the FFA Cup. He came on as a second-half substitute and scored from a deflected free kick that was taken by Scott Jamieson. On 16 April 2018, Genreau won the La Trobe University Educational Award at the conclusion of A-League regular season.

==== Loan to PEC Zwolle ====
On 26 June 2018, Genreau joined PEC Zwolle on a 1-year loan rejoining with former Melbourne City Manager John van 't Schip. Genreau showed a promising start during pre-season, leading to 5 goals in total by July 2018, scoring a brace against Hannover 96 and contributing a goal to a 3–1 win against Levante.

On 11 August 2018, Genreau started on his Eredivisie club debut in a 2–3 home loss against Heerenveen. Genreau returned to Melbourne City on 21 December 2018, after having troubles with injuries throughout the beginning of the league season. He made 10 league appearances with the club before returning home to Melbourne.

After recovering from his injury, Denis Genreau returned to the Melbourne City squad in Round 3 of the 2019–20 A-League season. He wasted no time in making an impact, contributing a goal with a well-placed lob pass to Jamie Maclaren to secure a 2–1 away win against Western United. By the end of the season, Genreau was set to leave at the end of his contract due to lack of playing time within the first team. During an interview on ABC Podcast, Genreau explained about his departure and revealed that he had realised a decline in the trust shown to him by new managers since the departure of John van 't Schip, believing that it was a factor in his lack of regular playing time.

=== Macarthur FC ===
On 28 July 2020, Macarthur FC announced the signing of Genreau on a free transfer after his contract expired with Melbourne City. Genreau signed a 3-year deal, expiring in 2023, in hopes of receiving regular playing time that head coach Ante Milicic promised. He is the second signing to be revealed by the expansion club other than Tommy Oar.

On 31 December 2020, Genreau was named in the starting line-up for Macarthur's first A-League game in the club's history, playing against Western Sydney Wanderers. The Bull's won 1–0 at full time with Ante Milicic giving praise to Genreau for his performance, given it was his 12th league appearance in Australia top-flight. On 10 February 2021, Genreau scored his first league goal in a 2–1 win against Brisbane Roar. Established as a regular during the season, Genreau would help his side reach 4th place in the league, but missed out on A-League Finals Series due to international duty. At the conclusion of the season, Genreau received The Macarthur Medal as part of Macarthur FC's inaugural end of season awards for his performances in the league.

=== Toulouse ===
On 31 July 2021, Macarthur released a statement that Genreau had agreed terms with French club Toulouse FC. On 2 August 2021, Toulouse announced the signing of Genreau in a deal worth $300,000 with potential add-ons. He is the first Australian player to have signed with the club.

On 14 August 2021, Genreau made his club debut against SC Bastia in Ligue 2, coming on as a substitute for Stijn Spierings in a 1–0 home win. During an away match with USL Dunkerque, Genreau received a knock to the face that caused his front teeth to buckle, making it difficult for him to close his mouth properly. After seeing a dentist to fix his teeth, he was required to wear a mouthguard for three months. Genreau started becoming a regular starter for the club after impressing in multiple games off the bench with his stamina and versatility under Philippe Montanier's system. In a crucial league match against Nîmes Olympique, on 7 May 2022, Genreau scored the winning goal that led to a 2–1 victory for Toulouse. After going down 1–0 at halftime, Toulouse managed to level the score with a goal by Ado Onaiwu before Genreau's winner, in the 79th minute, secured victory and ultimately led to Toulouse winning the league and securing promotion to Ligue 1. On 26 May 2022, Genreau won the PFA Harry Kewell Medal for his performances in the 34 appearances he made for his club.

During the 2022–23 season, in January 2023, Genreau would miss out on the game against Ajaccio due to a groin injury, leading him to undergo surgery soon after. He made his return coming off the bench, on 12 February, in a 3–1 win against Rennes. However, frequent injuries from pubalgia led to Genreau making appearances off the bench more and eventually relegated to the reserve side to earn playing time. Eventually impressing from his performance in the reserves and during training, Philippe Montanier promoted Genreau to a starting position in light of Brecht Dejaegere absence with the first team. He made his first start of the season, on 9 April, in a 2–1 win over Montpellier. On 30 April, Genreau was an unused substitute in Toulouse's Coupe de France win over Nantes and earned his second trophy with the club despite not making an appearance during the cup campaign. In May, Genreau missed the league match against Ajaccio for the birth of his son, Louis. He started in the last game of the Ligue 1 season for Toulouse against Monaco as he finished the campaign with 1 assist in 7 league starts and 13 substitute appearances.

=== Deportivo La Coruña ===
On 31 January 2025, Genreau joined Deportivo de La Coruña in the Spanish second tier on a two-and-a-half-year contract, with an extension option. On 28 August, he terminated his link with the club.

=== Melbourne Victory ===
Genreau returned to Australia for the 2025-26 season, signing with Melbourne Victory on a three-year contract.

== International career ==
=== Youth ===
Genreau earned his first call-up to the Australia U23 squad in January 2020 for the AFC U-23 Championship hosted in Thailand. He played in the opening group match against Thailand, helping his side secure a 2–1 victory. Although he did not feature in the remainder of the group stage, he made a second-half appearance in the semi-final against South Korea. He made one more appearance in the third-place playoff against Uzbekistan, where Australia won 1–0, securing their place in the 2020 Summer Olympics in Tokyo.

On 13 July 2021, Genreau was announced to play for Australia in the Olympics, marking the country's first Olympic football squad since 2008. On 22 July 2021, he made his Olympic debut against Argentina, helping his side win a 2–0 upset in their opening group match. Despite starting in all three games, Genreau would find his side finishing bottom of the group after losses against Spain and Egypt.

=== Senior ===
In May 2021, Genreau would receive his first international call-up for Australia in the 2nd group stage round of 2022 FIFA World Cup qualification in Asia. On 7 June 2021, Genreau made his debut in a 5–1 win against Chinese Taipei, being named in the starting eleven before getting taken off in the 84th minute. Genreau earned his second cap for Australia in a crucial World Cup qualifier against Saudi Arabia, but unfortunately, the game ended in a 1–0 defeat that prevented Australia from securing automatic qualification to the World Cup. This led Australia to qualify for the inter-confederation play-offs against Peru. On 14 June 2022, Genreau was an unused substitute in the match against Peru, which saw his side qualify for the World Cup after a penalty shoot-out.

In July 2023, Genreau was recalled for Australia, having not made an appearance since September 2022, for the exhibition game against World Cup champions Argentina. He was brought on in the second half, minutes before Germán Pezzella sealed Argentina's 2–0 win at the Workers' Stadium in Beijing.

== Career statistics ==
=== Club ===
As of 13 September 2026

Appearances and goals by club, season and competition
Club	Season	League			National cup		Continental		Total	
Club	Season	Division	Apps	Goals	Apps	Goals	Apps	Goals	Apps	Goals
Melbourne City NPL	2015	NPL Victoria 1	3	0	0	0	0	0	3	0
Melbourne City NPL	2016	NPL Victoria 2	27	0	0	0	0	0	27	0
Melbourne City NPL	2017	NPL Victoria 2	10	4	0	0	0	0	10	4
Melbourne City NPL	2018	NPL Victoria 2	12	3	0	0	0	0	12	3
Melbourne City NPL	Total		52	7	0	0	0	0	52	7
Melbourne City	2016–17	A-League	4	0	0	0	0	0	4	0
Melbourne City	2017–18	A-League	1	0	1	1	0	0	2	1
Melbourne City	2019–20	A-League	6	0	2	0	0	0	8	0
Melbourne City	Total		11	0	3	1	0	0	14	1
PEC Zwolle (loan)	2018–19	Eredivisie	10	0	2	0	0	0	12	0
Macarthur	2020–21	A-League	23	2	0	0	0	0	23	2
Toulouse	2021–22	Ligue 2	34	1	3	0	0	0	37	1
Toulouse	2022–23	Ligue 1	20	0	0	0	0	0	20	0
Toulouse	2023–24	Ligue 1	9	0	0	0	4	0	13	0
Toulouse	2024–25	Ligue 1	8	0	2	1	0	0	10	1
Toulouse	Total		71	1	5	1	4	0	80	2
Toulouse II	2022–23	Championnat National 3	3	1	0	0	0	0	3	1
Toulouse II	2023–24	Championnat National 2	2	2	0	0	0	0	2	2
Toulouse II	2024–25	Championnat National 3	1	0	0	0	0	0	1	0
Toulouse II	Total		6	3	0	0	0	0	6	3
Deportivo de La Coruña	2024–25	Segunda División	9	1	0	0	0	0	9	1
Melbourne Victory	2025–26	A-League Men	25	2	0	0	0	0	25	2
Melbourne Victory	2026–27	A-League Men	0	0	0	0	0	0	0	0
Melbourne Victory	Total		25	2	0	0	0	0	25	2
Career total			207	16	10	2	4	0	221	17

=== International ===
As of 26 September 2022

Appearances and goals by national team and year
National team	Year	Apps	Goals
Australia	2021	1	0
Australia	2022	3	0
Australia	2023	2	0
Total		6	0

== Honours ==
Toulouse

- Ligue 2: 2021–22
- Coupe de France: 2022–23

Individual

- Macarthur Medal: 2020–21
- Harry Kewell Medal: 2021–22
