= Xavier Stella =

Australian soccer player

Personal information
- Full name: Xavier Nicholas Stella
- Date of birth: August 21, 2006 (age 20)
- Place of birth: Melbourne, Victoria, Australia
- Position: Defensive midfielder

Team information
- Current team: Melbourne Victory
- Number: 22

Youth career
- Moreland City
- Templestowe United
- Hume City
- 2019: Northcote City
- 2020–2025: Melbourne City

Senior career*
Years	Team	Apps	(Gls)
2022–2025	Melbourne City NPL	52	(3)
2025	Melbourne City	0	(0)
2025–	Melbourne Victory	9	(0)

International career
2022	Australia U16		
2025–	Australia U19	3	(0)
- * Club domestic league appearances and goals

Xavier Stella (Italian: [ˈstɛlla]; born 21 August 2006) is an Australian professional association football player who currently plays as a midfielder for A-League club Melbourne Victory.

== Early life ==
Stella grew up in Melbourne’s northern suburbs and supported Melboourne Victory. He played junior football with Moreland City, Templestowe United, Hume City, and Northcote City respectively, before joining Melbourne City’s youth academy from the 2020 season onwards.

== Club career ==
=== Melbourne City 2022–2025 ===
After featuring for Melbourne City's U15, U16, U18 & U21 squads respectively for the 2020, 2021 and 2022 seasons respectively, Stella was promoted to the Senior NPL/VPL squad for the 2023 season. Stella made a total of 52 appearances across the 2023, 2024, and 2025 seasons combined, scoring three goals.

Stella would make his only appearance for the A-League squad of Melbourne City on 30 July 2025 in the 2025 Australia Cup round of 32 clash against APIA Leichhardt, coming onto the field as a substitute at the 61st minute.

=== Melbourne Victory 2025–Present ===
In September 2025, Stella joined cross-town rivals and childhood supporting club, Melbourne Victory, on a senior contract for the 2025–26 season. He made his A‑League Men debut on 18 October 2025 in a 0–0 draw against Auckland FC at AAMI Park, starting as the deepest midfielder and playing 68 minutes until he was substituted for Juan Mata.

As of 6 January 2026, he had made five league appearances for Victory in the 2025–26 season.

== International career ==
Stella has represented Australia at under‑16 and under‑19 levels.

== Style of play ==
A deep‑lying midfielder noted for his composure and positional discipline, Stella was deployed as the anchor in a midfield three on his A‑League debut.

== Career statistics ==
As of 5 January 2026

Appearances and goals by club, season and competition
Club	Season	League			National Cup (Note: Includes Australia Cup)		Continental		Other (Note: Includes A-League Men Finals series)		Total	
Club	Season	Division	Apps	Goals	Apps	Goals	Apps	Goals	Apps	Goals	Apps	Goals
Melbourne City FC NPL/VPL	2023	NPL Victoria 2	7	0	—		—		—		7	0
Melbourne City FC NPL/VPL	2024	Victorian Premier League 1	21	1	—		—		—		21	1
Melbourne City FC NPL/VPL	2025	Victorian Premier League 1	24	2	—		—		—		24	2
Melbourne City FC NPL/VPL	Melbourne City FC NPL/VPL Total		52	3	0	0	0	0	0	0	52	3
Melbourne City	2024–25	A-League Men	—		1	0	—		—		1	0
Melbourne City	Melbourne City Total		0	0	1	0	0	0	0	0	1	0
Melbourne Victory	2025–26	A-League Men	5	0	—		—		0	0	5	0
Melbourne Victory	Melbourne Victory Total		5	0	0	0	0	0	0	0	5	0
Career Total			57	3	1	0	0	0	0	0	58	3
