= Charles Nduka =

Japanese footballer

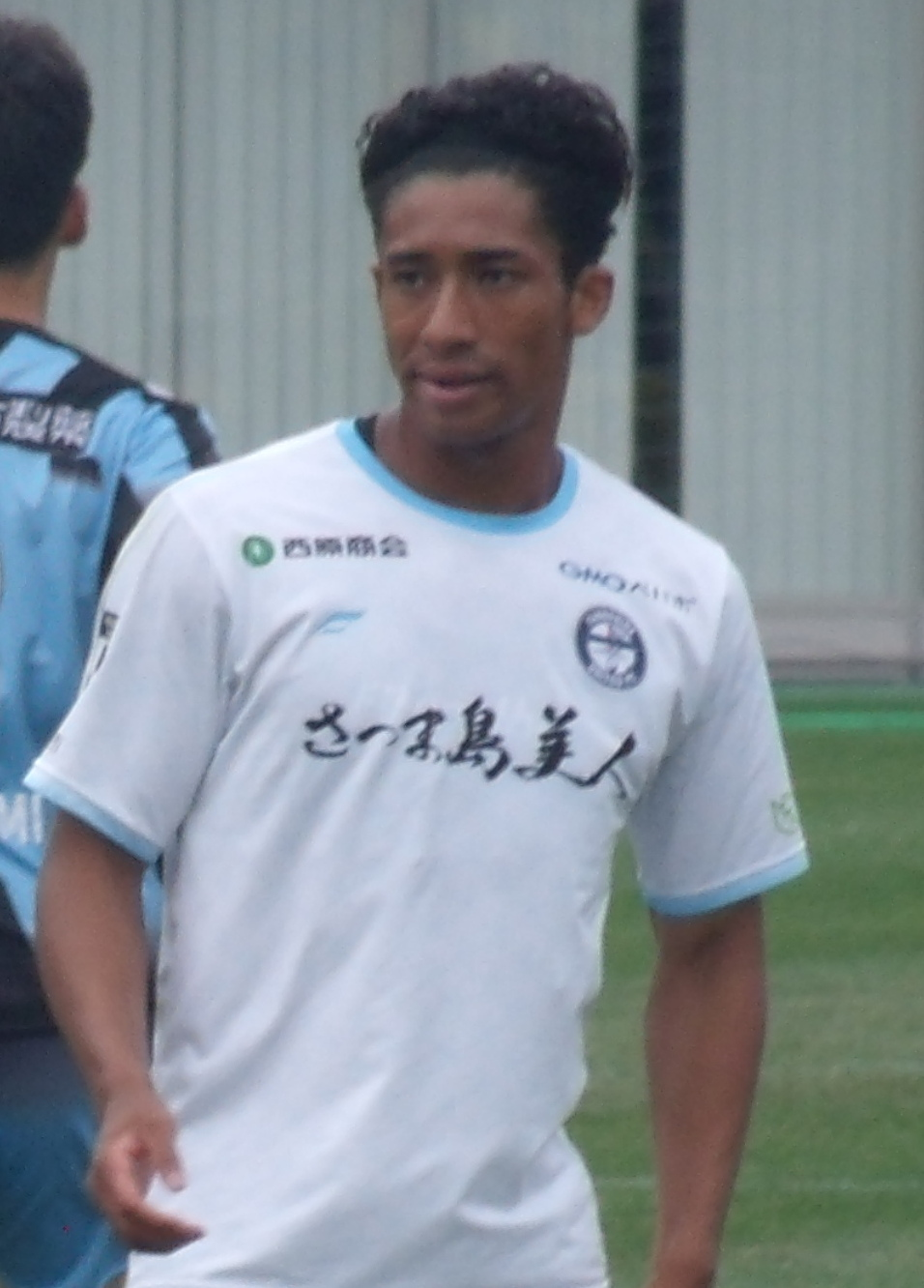
- Nduka with Kagoshima United in 2025

Personal information
- Full name: Charles Boniface Nduka
- Date of birth: 8 August 1998 (age 28)
- Place of birth: Saitama, Japan
- Height: 1.83 m (6 ft 0 in)
- Position: Forward

Team information
- Current team: Melbourne Victory
- Number: 44

Youth career
- Koshigaya Sanshin SSS
- –2013: FC Kasukabe
- 2015–2016: Meishu Gakuen Hitachi High School

College career
Years	Team	Apps	(Gls)
2017–2020	Josai University		

Senior career*
Years	Team	Apps	(Gls)
2021	YSCC Yokohama	22	(6)
2022–2023	FC Gifu	63	(9)
2024–2025	Kagoshima United	48	(9)
2026–	Melbourne Victory	15	(6)
- * Club domestic league appearances and goals as of 17 April 2026

Charles Boniface Nduka (ンドカ・チャールス, Ndoka Chārusu Bonifeisu; born 8 August 1998) is a Japanese footballer currently playing as a forward for A-League Men club, Melbourne Victory.

== Personal life ==
Nduka was born in Saitama, Japan. His mother is from Japan and his father is from Nigeria. He is the younger brother of fellow professional footballer Boniface Nduka currently play in Yokohama FC.

== Career statistics ==
=== Club ===
As of the 16 March 2026.

Club	Season	League			National Cup		League Cup		Other		Total	
Club	Season	Division	Apps	Goals	Apps	Goals	Apps	Goals	Apps	Goals	Apps	Goals
YSCC Yokohama	2021	J3 League	22	6	2 (Note: Appearances in the Emperor's Cup)	1	–		0	0	24	7
YSCC Yokohama	YSCC Yokohama Total		22	6	2	1	0	0	0	0	24	7
FC Gifu	2022	J3 League	27	2	2	0	–		0	0	29	2
FC Gifu	2023	J3 League	36	7	1	1	–		0	0	37	8
FC Gifu	FC Gifu Total		63	9	3	1	0	0	0	0	66	10
Kagoshima United	2024	J2 League	20	2	0	0	1 (Note: Appearances in the J. League Cup)	0	0	0	21	2
Kagoshima United	2025	J3 League	28	7	1	1	0	0	1 (Note: Appearances in the J.League Promotion & Relegation Series)	0	30	8
Kagoshima United	Kagoshima United Total		48	9	1	1	1	0	1	0	51	10
Melbourne Victory	2025–26	A-League Men	7	3	—		—		0	0	7	3
Melbourne Victory	Melbourne Victory Total		11	5	0	0	0	0	0	0	11	5
Career total			140	27	5	2	2	0	1	0	148	30
