= 2023 National Premier Leagues Victoria 3 =

2nd season of the National Premier Leagues Victoria 3

NPL Victoria 3
- Season: 2023
- Dates: 18 March – 19 August 2023
- Champions: Caroline Springs George Cross
- Promoted: Caroline Springs George Cross; Melbourne Victory Youth
- Relegated: Geelong SC; Ballarat City
- Matches: 132
- Goals: 466 (3.53 per match)
- Top goalscorer: Joshua Whiteley (16); Redouane Sarakh; Russell Currie
- All statistics correct as of 10 August 2024.

The 2023 National Premier Leagues Victoria 3 was the third season of the National Premier Leagues Victoria 3, the third-tier competition in Victorian football. The season was won by Caroline Springs George Cross, who along with Melbourne Victory Youth, were promoted to Victoria Premier League 1. Geelong SC and Ballarat City were relegated to Victorian State League Division 1.

== Teams ==
12 Teams competed in the 2023 National premier leagues Victoria 3.

Team	Location	Stadium	Capacity
Ballarat City	Ballarat (Redan)	Morshead Park	8,500
Beaumaris SC	Beaumaris	Beaumaris Reserve	1,000
Boroondara-Carey Eagles	Melbourne (Bulleen)	carey bulleen sports complex	1,000
Box Hill United	Melbourne (Box Hill)	Wembley Park	2,500
Caroline Springs George Cross	Melbourne (Fraser Rise)	City Vista Recreation Reserve	3,000
Doveton	Melbourne (Eumemmerring)	Waratah Reserve	1,000
Essendon Royals	Melbourne (Essendon)	Ormond Park	1,000
Geelong	Geelong (Norlane)	Stead Park	1,000
Goulburn Valley Suns	Shepparton	John McEwen Reserve	3,200
Melbourne Victory Youth	Melbourne (Epping)	Epping Stadium	10,000
North Sunshine Eagles	Melbourne (St Albans)	Larissa Reserve	1,000
Nunwading City	Melbourne (Forest Hill)	Mahoneys Reserve	1,000

== League table ==
Pos	Team	Pld	W	D	L	GF	GA	GD	Pts	Promotion, qualification or relegation
1	Caroline Springs George Cross (C, P)	22	17	1	4	50	23	+27	52	Promotion to the VPL 1
2	Melbourne Victory Youth (P)	22	13	3	6	47	22	+25	42	Promotion to the VPL 1
3	North Sunshine Eagles	22	12	2	8	55	41	+14	38	
4	Goulburn Valley Suns	22	11	5	6	41	35	+6	38	
5	Nunawading City	22	11	2	9	46	39	+7	35	
6	Boroondara-Carey Eagles	22	11	2	9	43	41	+2	35	
7	Doveton SC	22	8	3	11	27	42	−15	27	
8	Box Hill United	22	7	4	11	34	44	−10	25	
9	Beaumaris SC	22	7	3	12	32	39	−7	24	
10	Essendon Royals	22	6	5	11	29	36	−7	23	
11	Geelong SC (R)	22	5	6	11	27	40	−13	21	Relegation to Victorian State League Division 1
12	Ballarat City (R)	22	5	2	15	35	64	−29	17	Relegation to Victorian State League Division 1

Rules for classification: 1) Points; 2) Goal difference; 3) Goals scored
(C) Champions; (P) Promoted; (R) Relegated

== Statistics ==
=== Top scorers ===
There were 3 top goal scorers in the 2023 NPL Victoria 3. The three top scorers got 16 goals throughout the season and were Redouane Sarakh (20 games), Russell Currie (21 games), and Joshua Whiteley (22 games)

Rank	Player	Club	Goals	Games	GPG
1	Redouane Sarakh	North Sunshine Eagles	16	20	0.8
1	Russell Currie	Goulburn Valley Suns	16	21	0.76
1	Joshua Whiteley	Caroline Springs George Cross	16	22	0.73
4	Nicholas Epifano	North Sunshine Eagles	15	21	0.71
5	Michael Romas	Box Hill United & Nunwading City	13	20	0.65
6	Kenta Futami	Ballarat City	12	22	0.54
7	Dean Clarke	Essendon Royals	10	19	0.52

=== Discipline ===
==== Yellow Cards ====
Jake Brocklebank got the most yellow cards in the 2023 season.

Rank	Player	Club	YC	Games	YCPG
1	Jake Brocklebank	Goulburn Valley Suns	14	16	0.87
2	Levi Tarbotton	Caroline Springs George Cross	10	19	0.53
2	Miguel Restrepo	Nunwading City	10	19	0.53
4	Joseph Adoo-Peters	Goulburn Valley Suns	9	19	0.47
4	Matthew Lelliott	Goulburn Valley Suns	9	19	0.47
4	Jye Spiteri	Geelong	9	17	0.53

=== Red cards ===
Jye Spiteri got the most red cards in the 2023 season.

Rank	Player	Club	RC	Games	RCPG
1	Jye Spiteri	Geelong	3	17	0.18
2	Lunorphare Folly	Ballarat City	2	18	0.11
2	Morgan Filer	Caroline Springs George Cross	2	18	0.11
2	Xagai Douhadji	Ballarat City	2	18	0.11
2	Tyler James	Caroline Springs George Cross	2	19	0.10
2	Sam O'Regan	Beaumaris SC	2	19	0.10

== See also ==
- 2023 National Premier Leagues
- 2022–23 in Australian soccer
- 2023–24 in Australian soccer
