= Keegan Jelacic =

Australian soccer player

Personal information
- Full name: Keegan Daniel Jelacic
- Date of birth: 31 July 2002 (age 24)
- Place of birth: Brisbane, Queensland, Australia
- Height: 1.77 m (5 ft 10 in)
- Position: Attacking midfielder

Team information
- Current team: Melbourne Victory
- Number: 23

Youth career
- Rochedale Rovers
- Brisbane Strikers

Senior career*
Years	Team	Apps	(Gls)
2019	Lions FC	12	(0)
2020–2021	Brisbane Roar NPL	33	(12)
2021	Brisbane Roar	2	(0)
2022	Olympic FC	11	(9)
2022–2023	Perth Glory	22	(2)
2023–2025	Gent	0	(0)
2023	→ Stabæk (loan)	8	(0)
2023	→ Stabæk 2 (loan)	5	(2)
2024–2025	→ Brisbane Roar (loan)	35	(3)
2025–	Melbourne Victory	27	(5)

International career
2019	New Zealand U17	5	(0)
2023–	Australia U23	4	(0)
- * Club domestic league appearances and goals as of 10 February 2026

Keegan Daniel Jelačić (Croatian: [jělatʃitɕ]; born 31 July 2002) is an Australian professional soccer player who plays as a midfielder for Australian club Melbourne Victory.

== Club career ==
On 30 May 2023, Jelacic signed a three-year contract with Gent. On 14 August 2023, he was loaned to the Norwegian club Stabæk until the end of 2023. In January 2024, he returned to Australia to join Brisbane Roar on loan until the end of the season. At the end of his loan Jelacic would join Melbourne Victory on 20 June 2025.

== International career ==
Jelacic was born in Australia to a Croatian father and New Zealand mother. He has previously represented New Zealand at youth level. On 7 March 2023, he was called up for the Australia U-23 team.

== Career statistics ==
As of match played 10 February 2026

Appearances and goals by club, season and competition
Club	Season	League			National cup (Note: Includes Australia Cup)		Total	
Club	Season	Division	Apps	Goals	Apps	Goals	Apps	Goals
Lions	2019	Queensland NPL	8	0	3	0	11	0
Brisbane Roar NPL	2020	Queensland NPL	20	3	—		20	3
Brisbane Roar NPL	2021	Queensland NPL	13	9	—		13	9
Brisbane Roar NPL	Total		33	12	—		33	12
Olympic	2022	Queensland NPL	11	9	—		11	9
Perth Glory	2022–23	A-League Men	22	2	0	0	22	2
Gent	2023–24	Belgian Pro League	0	0	0	0	0	0
Stabæk (loan)	2023	Eliteserien	8	0	0	0	8	0
Brisbane Roar (loan)	2023–24	A-League Men	11	1	—		11	1
Brisbane Roar (loan)	2024–25	A-League Men	24	2	2	1	26	3
Brisbane Roar (loan)	Total		35	3	2	1	37	4
Melbourne Victory	2025–26	A-League Men	16	4	1	1	17	5
Career total			133	30	6	2	139	32
