= Langwarrin SC =

Langwarrin Soccer Club
- Nickname: Langy
- Founded: 1964; 62 years ago
- Ground: Lawton Reserve, Langwarrin South
- Capacity: approx. 5000
- Chairman: James Bretnall
- Manager: Jamie Skelly
- League: Victoria Premier League 1
- 2026: 11th of 14
- Website: https://www.langwarrinsoccerclub.org.au/
Home colours	Away colours

Langwarrin Soccer Club is an Australian soccer club based in Langwarrin South, a suburb of Melbourne, Victoria, Australia. Founded in 1964, the club competes in Victorian Premier League 1.

== History ==
Langwarrin Soccer Club was formed by local Dutch Australians in 1964 as an alternative to Australian rules football in the region. The initial name of the club was The Langwarrin All Stars. The side played its first games at the local primary school, and soon moved to the site of the Frankston golf driving range on Cranbourne Road. The first game was against Melbourne who beat the young All Stars 20–1.

In 1968, the club moved to its current home on Barretts Road. The land was donated to the club by Wally Lawton and became known as Lawton Park. The first senior team at Langwarrin was formed in 1968.

In 1981, Langwarrin entered the Victorian Provisional League One. In 1991, works were completed on the new clubrooms at Lawton Reserve. In 1994 the grounds were relaid.

In 1999, Gus Macleod was appointed as senior head coach of the club, a position he would go on to hold for 20 seasons.

Langwarrin was promoted to the National Premier Leagues Victoria 2 competition after taking out the State League Division 1 South-East championship title in 2017. In 2018, the club's first season in the National Premier Leagues league system, Langy finished in 8th place in the 10-team NPL2 East competition.

In August 2018, after iconic coach Gus Macleod resigned from his role, the club announced that Scott Miller would coach the team for the 2019 season. Miller brought in a number of high-profile players for the 2019 season, including former Oakleigh Cannons midfielder Wayne Wallace, Damir Stoilovic, David Stirton, Roddy Covarrubias, Jamie Cumming, Jordan Templin and Fraser Maclaren.

== Current squad ==
Note: Flags indicate national team as defined under FIFA eligibility rules; some limited exceptions apply. Players may hold more than one non-FIFA nationality.

No.	Pos.	Nation	Player
—	MF	ENG	Rogan McGeorge
—		AUS	Jaiden Madafferi
—	DF	AUS	Jamie Cumming
—	MF	AUS	Callum Goulding
—		AUS	Jacob Brito
—	FW	AUS	Joshua Varga
—		AUS	James Burgess
—		AUS	Bradley Chick
—		AUS	Nathan Cook
—		AUS	Charles Fry
—		AUS	Luke Goulding
—		AUS	Christopher Gregory
—		AUS	Kyoungjin Jeong
—		AUS	James Kelly
—		AUS	Nathan Lynders

No.	Pos.	Nation	Player
—		AUS	Joshua Meaker
—		AUS	Tristan Meaker
—		AUS	Jeremy Min Fa
—		AUS	Thomas Podaridis
—		AUS	Lucas Portelli
—		AUS	Simon Storey
—	FW	SCO	Archibald Macphee
—	FW	AUS	Bradley Blumenthal
—	MF	AUS	Jordan Templin
—	GK	AUS	Fraser Maclaren
—		AUS	Thomas Ahmadzai
—	DF	AUS	Luke Burgess
—		AUS	Dylan Kilner
—	FW	AUS	Damir Stoilović
—	FW	AUS	David Stirton
—	FW	AUS	Rodrigo Covarrubias

== League Standings ==
YEAR	VICTORIAN LEAGUE	POSITION
2025	Victorian Premier League 1	10th
2024	Victorian Premier League 1	9th
2023	NPL Victoria 2	10th
2022	NPL Victoria 2	7th
2021	Cancelled due to the COVID-19 pandemic in Australia	
2020	Cancelled due to the COVID-19 pandemic in Australia	
2019	NPL Victoria 2	4th
2018	NPL Victoria 2	8th
2017	State League 1	1st
2016	State League 1	6th
2015	State League 1	4th
2014	State League 1	3rd
2013	State League 2	3rd
2012	State League 2	6th
2011	State League 1	13th
2010	State League 1	6th
2009	State League 1	7th
2008	State League 1	8th
2007	State League 1	5th
2006	State League 1	3rd

== Honours ==
=== Team ===
- State League 1

Champions(1) 2017

- State League 2

Champions(1) 2004
Runners Up (3) 2001, 2002, 2003

- State League 3

Champions(1) 2000

- State League 4

Champions(1) 1999

=== Individual ===
- State League 1 South-East Golden Boot

2016 - Caleb Nicholes
