= 2026 Victoria Premier League 1 =

2nd season of the Victoria Premier League 1

Victoria Premier League 1
- Season: 2026
- Dates: 13 February – 30 August 2026
- Champions: Melbourne Knights
- Promoted: Brunswick Juventus; Melbourne Knights; Northcote City
- Relegated: North Sunshine Eagles; Port Melbourne; Western United Youth (folded)
- Matches: 48
- Goals: 165 (3.44 per match)
- All statistics correct as of 29 March 2026.

The 2026 Victoria Premier League 1 was the fourth season of the Victoria Premier League 1, the third-tier competition in Australian football and the second-tier in Victorian football.

== Teams ==
\
Locations of 2026 VPL 1 clubs within metropolitan Melbourne.

14 teams competed in the 2026 Victoria Premier League 1 in 2026.

Team	Location	Stadium	Capacity
Brunswick City	Brunswick West	Dunstan Reserve	1,000
Brunswick Juventus	Fawkner	CB Smith Reserve	2,000
Bulleen Lions	Bulleen	David Barro Stadium	3,000
Eltham Redbacks	Eltham North	Eltham North Reserve	1,000
Langwarrin	Langwarrin South	Lawton Park Reserve	5,000
Manningham United Blues	Templestowe	Pettys Reserve	1,000
Melbourne Knights	Sunshine North	Knights Stadium	15,000
Melbourne Srbija	Burnley	Kevin Bartlett Reserve	2,500
Melbourne Victory	Bundoora	The Home of the Matildas	3,000
Northcote City	Thornbury	John Cain Memorial Park	5,000
North Geelong Warriors	Lara	Elcho Park	5,000
North Sunshine Eagles	St Albans	Larisa Reserve	1,000
Port Melbourne	Port Melbourne	SS Anderson Reserve	1,000
Western United	Tarneit	Wyndham Regional Football Facility	5,000

== Regular season ==
=== League table ===
Pos	Team	Pld	W	D	L	GF	GA	GD	Pts	Promotion, qualification or relegation
1	Melbourne Knights (C, P)	24	15	4	5	43	19	+24	49	Promotion to the NPL Victoria
2	Brunswick Juventus (P)	24	15	2	7	42	26	+16	47	Promotion to the NPL Victoria
3	Melbourne Victory Youth	24	13	4	7	55	32	+23	43	Qualification for the promotional play-offs
4	Northcote City (O, P)	24	13	4	7	38	27	+11	43	Qualification for the promotional play-offs
5	Bulleen Lions	24	12	6	6	44	30	+14	42	Qualification for the promotional play-offs
6	Eltham Redbacks	24	10	6	8	53	37	+16	36	Qualification for the promotional play-offs
7	Melbourne Srbija	24	11	3	10	27	25	+2	36	
8	Manningham United Blues	24	9	3	12	32	48	−16	30	
9	North Geelong Warriors	24	9	2	13	32	49	−17	29	
10	Brunswick City	24	8	3	13	40	49	−9	27	
11	Langwarrin SC	24	6	6	12	40	52	−12	24	
12	North Sunshine Eagles (R)	24	5	5	14	29	38	−9	20	Relegation to the Victoria Premier League 2
13	Port Melbourne (R)	24	4	4	16	12	55	−43	16	Relegation to the Victoria Premier League 2
14	Western United Youth	0	0	0	0	0	0	0	0	Club folded; results expunged

Source: Dribl
Rules for classification: 1) Points; 2) Goal difference; 3) Goals scored
(C) Champions; (O) Play-off winners; (P) Promoted; (R) Relegated

=== Results ===
Teams play each other twice (once at home and once away).

Home \ Away	BCY	BJV	BUL	ERB	LAN	MUB	MEK	MSB	MVC	NGW	NSE	NOR	PTM
Brunswick City		0–3	0–2	3–1	3–1	3–1	0–3	0–2	3–2	4–0	1–1	2–4	5–0
Brunswick Juventus	7–2		1–5	2–1	3–0	3–0	0–1	1–1	2–1	3–0	1–2	1–0	3–0
Bulleen Lions	1–1	1–2		1–3	3–1	1–2	2–0	0–0	2–4	3–0	2–1	3–1	1–0
Eltham Redbacks	2–2	2–0	2–2		2–1	5–0	2–2	0–2	3–3	3–1	3–2	1–1	8–0
Langwarrin SC	3–4	0–1	2–2	1–6		4–1	1–4	3–1	3–3	1–1	1–2	1–3	5–0
Manningham United Blues	3–2	1–0	3–1	2–1	4–0		1–5	1–2	0–3	2–3	1–0	0–2	0–1
Melbourne Knights	2–0	0–1	3–1	4–0	0–2	0–0		2–0	3–1	2–1	2–1	3–0	2–0
Melbourne Srbija	2–1	1–0	0–1	1–2	0–0	0–1	2–0		2–1	1–0	3–2	1–2	0–1
Melbourne Victory Youth	4–1	4–0	2–2	2–1	3–3	4–0	1–2	1–0		2–1	1–0	0–1	4–0
North Geelong Warriors	1–0	3–4	0–4	3–2	2–4	1–3	1–0	2–1	0–2		3–0	2–1	1–1
North Sunshine Eagles	2–0	0–0	0–1	1–1	0–1	2–2	1–1	1–2	1–4	3–4		0–2	1–0
Northcote City	1–0	1–2	1–1	1–0	3–1	3–3	0–1	2–3	1–0	3–0	2–1		0–0
Port Melbourne	1–3	0–2	1–2	0–2	1–1	2–1	1–1	1–0	1–3	0–2	0–5	1–3	

Source: Dribl
Legend: Blue = home team win; Yellow = draw; Red = away team win.
For upcoming matches, an "a" indicates there is an article about the rivalry between the two participants.

== Promotional play-offs ==
Teams placed third, fourth, fifth, and sixth in the regular season compete in the play-offs, with the winner being promoted to the National Premier Leagues Victoria in 2026.

=== Bracket ===
Semi-finals
3	Melbourne Victory Youth	2
6	Eltham Redbacks	0
4	Northcote City	3
5	Bulleen Lions	2

Final
3	Melbourne Victory Youth	1 (4)
4	Northcote City	1 (5)

=== Semi-finals ===
11 September 2026
15:00 AEST (UTC+10:00)

Melbourne Victory Youth	2–0	Eltham Redbacks
Mihailidis 17' (pen.); Dunbar 79'

The Home of the Matildas, Bundoora

11 September 2026
15:00 AEST (UTC+10:00)

Northcote City	3–2	Bulleen Lions
Morton 11', 60'; Taylor 89'		Bell 56'; Assumpcao 71'

John Cain Memorial Park, Thornbury

=== Final ===
19 September 2026
17:00 AEST (UTC+10:00)

Melbourne Victory Youth	1–1 (a.e.t.)	Northcote City
Dragicevic 1'	Report	Morton 27'
Penalties
Mihailidis (penalty scored); Radimisis (penalty scored); Dragicevic (penalty scored); Limberis (penalty scored); Tanfara (penalty missed)	4–5	Warde (penalty scored); Morton (penalty scored); Hallam (penalty scored); Appleton (penalty scored); Serdenes (penalty scored)

Lakeside Stadium, Albert Park
Referee: Lucas Mattia

== Statistics ==
As of 29 March 2026

=== Top goal scorers ===
Mikey Ghossaini scored the most goals with a total of 18 goals.

Rank	Player	Club	Goals
1	Mikey Ghossaini	Melbourne Victory	18
2	Billy Romas	Eltham Redbacks	16
3	Triantafilos Skapetis	Brunswick City	14
4	Alex Lee	Melbourne Victory	13
4	Robert Harding	Manningham United Blues	13

=== Discipline ===
==== Yellow Cards ====
George Tsalikidis, have the most yellow cards with 10.

Rank	Player	Club	YC
1	George Tsalikidis	Manningham United Blues	10
2	Triantafilos Skapetis	Brunswick City	9
3	6 Players	Multiple clubs	8

==== Red Cards ====
Kobe Timms and Matias Contreras have the most Red cards. they all have only 2 red card.
