= Nishan Velupillay =

Australian soccer player (born 2001)

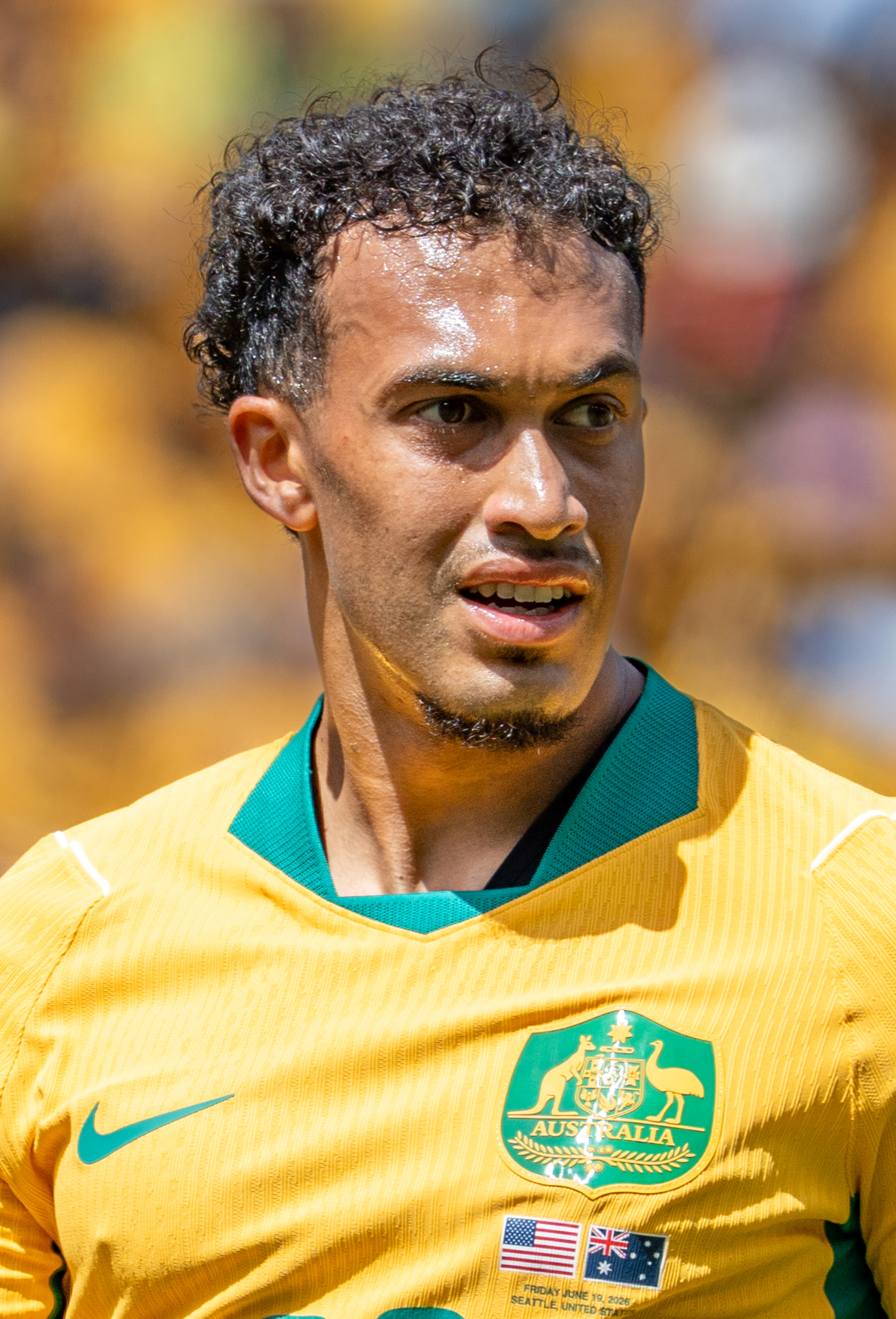
- Velupillay with Australia in 2026

Personal information
- Full name: Nishan Matthew Velupillay
- Date of birth: 7 May 2001 (age 25)
- Place of birth: Melbourne, Victoria, Australia
- Height: 1.81 m (5 ft 11 in)
- Position: Winger

Team information
- Current team: FC Ingolstadt
- Number: 28

Youth career
- Endeavour United
- Glen Eira FC
- Bentleigh Greens

Senior career*
Years	Team	Apps	(Gls)
2019–2022	Melbourne Victory NPL	17	(6)
2021–2026	Melbourne Victory	128	(19)
2026–	FC Ingolstadt	11	(1)

International career^{‡}
2023–2024	Australia U23	14	(5)
2024–	Australia	9	(3)
Medal record
Men's football
Representing Australia
WAFF U-23 Championship
Runner-up	2024
- * Club domestic league appearances and goals as of 14 June 2025 ‡ National team caps and goals as of 19 June 2026

Nishan Matthew Velupillay (Tamil: நிஷான் மேத்யூ வேலுப்பிள்ளை, pronounced [niːʃɑːn ʋeːlupːiɭɭai]; born 7 May 2001) is an Australian professional soccer player who plays as a winger for 3. Liga club FC Ingolstadt and the Australia national team.

== Early life ==
Velupillay was born on 7 May 2001 in Melbourne. His father, Sasinath, is of Malaysian with Sri Lankan Tamil heritage, and his mother, Gillian, is Anglo-Indian. He grew up in Melbourne, where he attended Mazenod College in Mulgrave, and later studied finance, although travel commitments made it difficult to continue.

Velupillay came from a football-following family; his father had played the game, and an older brother played and coached at the football technique school (FTS) that Velupillay attended. The family supported Melbourne Victory, and as a child Velupillay was in the crowd for the club's 6–0 win over Adelaide United in the 2007 A-League Grand Final. He began playing at the age of five but took little interest at first, becoming more committed once he started scoring goals. As a youngster he admired attacking players such as Neymar and Cristiano Ronaldo.

As a teenager in the FTS program at Glen Eira, Velupillay was coached by Jasper Kristensen, who recalled that he showed strong technique and understanding of the game from an early age but was shy and reserved, with "a volcano in there". Velupillay plateaued during his adolescent growth, a stage at which many promising players lose momentum, but he persisted with what Kristensen described as calm and consistent support from his parents, while several of his highly rated contemporaries left the game.

== Club career ==
=== Early career ===
Velupillay began playing junior football with Endeavour United before moving to the football technique school (FTS) based at Glen Eira, where his ability soon stood out. He then played for Bentleigh Greens at the under-18 and under-20 levels before progressing to their senior team and earning a four-week trial with Melbourne Victory.

=== Melbourne Victory ===
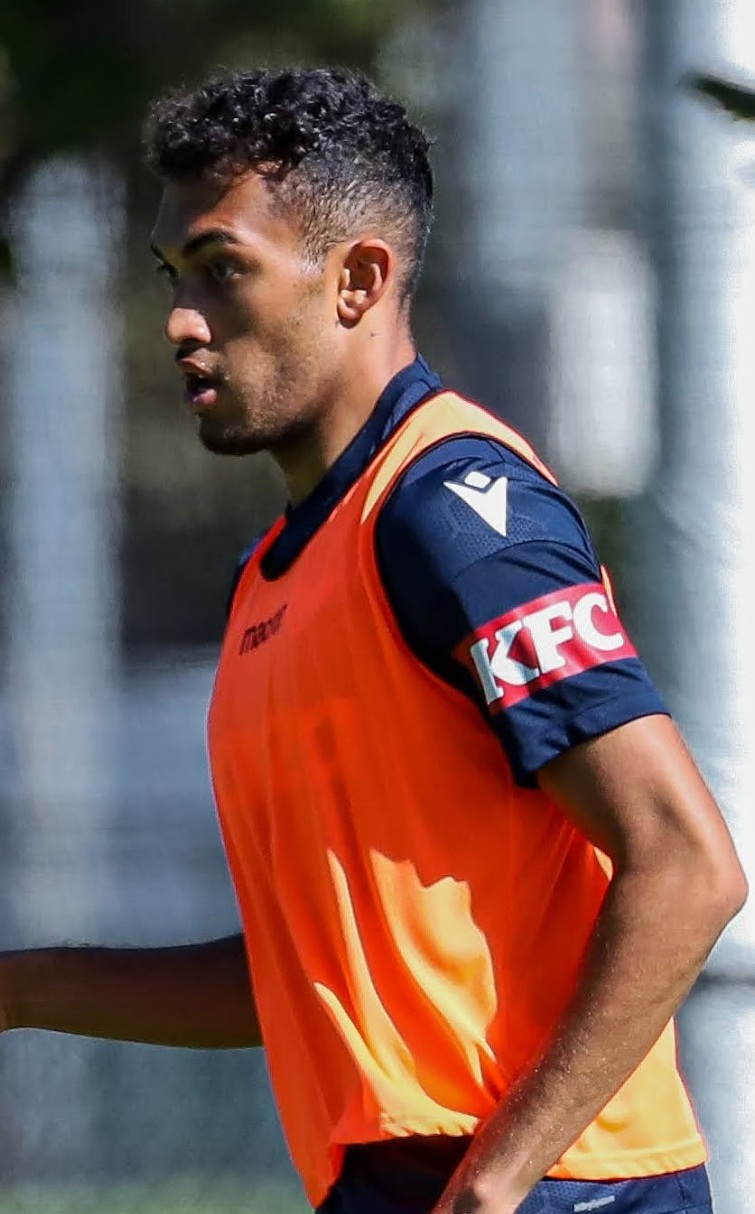
Velupillay training with Melbourne Victory in 2023

Velupillay signed his first professional contract with Melbourne Victory in 2019. He made his professional debut for the club on 19 May 2021, coming on as a substitute in a 0–2 defeat against Sydney. On 11 December 2021, Velupillay scored his first professional goal, netting the winning goal in a 2–1 win over Adelaide United. In the 2024 finals series, Velupillay scored a late goal in the 88th minute in an elimination final against Melbourne City, to make the scores level and put the match into extra-time. In the 2024-25 season Velupillay became the top goal-scorer for Melbourne Victory in all competitions, and the joint top goal-scorer for the club in the regular season. Velupillay missed out on playing in the 2025 A-League Grand final against Melbourne City due to an injury.

=== FC Ingolstadt 04 ===
On 18 August 2026, Velupillay joined FC Ingolstadt 04 of 3. Liga for an undisclosed fee.

== International career ==
In October 2024, Velupillay was called up by Australia national coach Tony Popovic ahead of their 2026 FIFA World Cup qualifying matches against China and Japan. On 10 October, in the match against China, he came off the bench in the 83rd minute to replace Mitchell Duke to mark off his international debut. 7 minutes later, he scored his first international goal to seal a 3–1 win.

Further goals from Velupillay for the Socceroos came in the March qualifying window for the 2026 FIFA World Cup. He scored in both games that window, first against Indonesia and then followed by China 5 days later, with this being the second time he had scored against the Chinese national team. These two goals were a part of a 6 game scoring streak for Velupillay for club and country.

On 31 May 2026, Velupillay was named in Australia's 26-man squad for the 2026 FIFA World Cup. He made his World Cup debut on 13 June 2026 against Turkey, coming on in the 61st minute of a 2–0 win. He was reported as the first player of Tamil heritage, and the first of Malaysian descent, to appear at a FIFA World Cup.

== Career statistics ==
=== Club statistics ===
As of 3 June 2025

Club	Season	League			Cup (Note: Includes appearance(s) in the Australia Cup)		Other		Total	
Club	Season	Division	Apps	Goals	Apps	Goals	Apps	Goals	Apps	Goals
Melbourne Victory Youth	2021	NPL Victoria 3	5	2	—		—		5	2
Melbourne Victory Youth	2022	NPL Victoria 3	3	1	—		1	0	4	1
Melbourne Victory Youth	Total		8	3	—		1	0	9	3
Melbourne Victory	2020–21	A-League Men	4	0	—		—		4	0
Melbourne Victory	2021–22	A-League Men	22	2	2	0	2 (Note: Appearances in A-League Finals)	0	26	2
Melbourne Victory	2022–23	A-League Men	26	3	1	0	—		27	3
Melbourne Victory	2023–24	A-League Men	23	2	1	1	4	1	28	4
Melbourne Victory	2024–25	A-League Men	22	7	5	5	3	0	30	12
Melbourne Victory	2025–26	A-League Men	17	3	0	0	—		17	3
Melbourne Victory	Total		114	17	9	6	9	1	132	24
FC Ingolstadt 04	2026–27	3. Liga	0	0	0	0	—		0	0
Career total			122	20	9	6	10	1	141	27

=== International ===
As of match played 19 June 2026

Appearances and goals by national team and year
National team	Year	Apps	Goals
Australia	2025	5	3
Australia	2026	4	0
Total		9	3

Scores and results list Australia's goal tally first.

=== International goals ===
No.	Date	Venue	Opponent	Score	Result	Competition
1.	10 October 2024	Adelaide Oval, Adelaide, Australia	China	3–1	3–1	2026 FIFA World Cup qualification
2.	20 March 2025	Sydney Football Stadium, Sydney, Australia	Indonesia	2–0	5–1	2026 FIFA World Cup qualification
3.	25 March 2025	Hangzhou Sports Park Stadium, Hangzhou, China	China	2–0	2–0	2026 FIFA World Cup qualification

== Honours ==
Melbourne Victory

- FFA Cup: 2021

Australia U-23

- WAFF U-23 Championship runner-up: 2024

Individual

- Young Player of the Year: 2021–22
