= 2024 Victoria Premier League 1 =

2nd season of the National Premier Leagues Victoria 3

Victoria Premier League 1
- Season: 2024
- Dates: 9 February – 18 August 2024
- Champions: Melbourne Victory Youth
- Promoted: Melbourne Victory Youth; Preston Lions
- Relegated: North Geelong Warriors; Werribee City
- Matches played: 182
- Goals scored: 645 (3.54 per match)
- Top goalscorer: Archibald Macphee (16); Michael Domfeh
- Biggest home win: Western United Youth 7-0 Langwarrin (28 April 2024)
- Biggest away win: Bentleigh Greens 1-7 Western United Youth (1 March 2024)
- Highest scoring: Bulleen Lions 5-5 Melbourne Victory Youth (29 July 2024)
- All statistics correct as of 18 August 2024.

The 2024 Victoria Premier League 1 was the first season of the newly renamed Victoria Premier League 1, the third-tier competition in Victorian football. The season was won by Melbourne Victory Youth, who along with Preston Lions, were promoted to National Premier Leagues Victoria. North Geelong Warriors and Werribee City were relegated to the Victoria Premier League 2.

== Teams ==
14 teams competed in the 2024 Victoria Premier League 1.

Locations of 2024 VPL1 Victoria clubs.

Team	Location	Stadium	Capacity
Bentleigh Greens	Cheltenham	Kingston Heath Soccer Complex	3,300
Brunswick City	Brunswick West	Dunstan Reserve	1,000
Bulleen Lions	Bulleen	David Barro Stadium	3,000
Caroline Springs George Cross	Fraser Rise	City Vista Recreation Reserve	3,000
Eastern Lions	Burwood	Gardiners Reserve	1,500
Kingston City	Clayton South	The Grange Reserve	2,000
Langwarrin	Langwarrin South	Lawton Park Reserve	5,000
Melbourne City Youth	Cranbourne East	CFA Melbourne	1,500
Melbourne Victory Youth	Epping	Epping Stadium	10,000
Northcote City	Thornbury	John Cain Memorial Park	5,000
North Geelong Warriors	Lara	Elcho Park	5,000
Preston Lions	Reservoir	B.T. Connor Reserve	5,000
Werribee City	Werribee	Galvin Park Reserve	1,000
Western United Youth	Tarniet	Wyndham Regional Football Facility	5,000

== League table ==
Pos	Team	Pld	W	D	L	GF	GA	GD	Pts	Promotion, qualification or relegation
1	Melbourne Victory Youth (C, P)	26	15	7	4	66	39	+27	52	Promotion to the NPL Victoria
2	Preston Lions (P)	26	15	5	6	53	39	+14	50	Promotion to the NPL Victoria
3	Western United Youth	26	15	4	7	78	41	+37	49	
4	Northcote City	26	13	7	6	51	37	+14	46	
5	Melbourne City Youth	26	11	8	7	55	41	+14	41	
6	Bulleen Lions	26	9	10	7	42	43	−1	37	
7	Caroline Springs George Cross	26	10	6	10	39	39	0	36	
8	Bentleigh Greens	26	10	5	11	42	45	−3	35	
9	Langwarrin SC	26	9	7	10	46	53	−7	34	
10	Eastern Lions	26	8	6	12	32	47	−15	30	
11	Brunswick City	26	8	5	13	43	46	−3	29	
12	Kingston City	26	7	7	12	39	54	−15	28	
13	Werribee City (R)	26	3	9	14	30	64	−34	18	Relegation to VPL 2
14	North Geelong Warriors (R)	26	4	4	18	29	57	−28	16	Relegation to VPL 2

Rules for classification: 1) Points; 2) Goal difference; 3) Goals scored
(C) Champions; (P) Promoted; (R) Relegated

== Statistics ==
=== Top Scorers ===
There were two top goal scorers in the 2024 VPL1. the two top goal scorers were Archibald Macphee and Michael Domfeh.

Rank	Player	Club	Goals	Games	GPG
1	Archibald Macphee	Langwarrin	16	26	0.62
1	Michael Domfeh	Northcote City	16	26	0.62
3	Adem Duratovic	Melbourne Victory Youth	14	25	0.56
4	Jake Najdovski	Western United Youth	13	13	1.0
4	Nicolas Koek	Western United Youth	13	24	0.54
4	Dylan Allshorn	Brunswick City	13	25	0.52
7	Tommaso Minutoli	Melbourne Victory Youth	12	18	0.66
7	Cooper Legrand	Kingston City	12	25	0.48

=== Discipline ===
==== Yellow Cards ====
There were three people who got the most yellow cards. The three player all got 10 yellow cards each, they were James Wilson (20 games), Triantafilos Skapetis (23 games), and Gregory Zacharias (23 games).

Rank	Player	Club	YC	Games	YCPG
1	James Wilson	Bulleen Lions	10	20	0.5
1	Triantafilos Skapetis	Northcote City	10	23	0.43
1	Gregory Zacharias	Eastern Lions	10	23	0.43

==== Red Card ====
Joseph Adoo-Peters was the player with the Highest amount of red cards in the 2024 VPL1 season.

Rank	Player	Club	RC	Games	RCPG
1	Joseph Adoo-Peters	Caroline Springs George Cross	3	19	0.16
2	Matthew Stosic	North Geelong Warriors	2	19	0.11
2	James Wilson	Bulleen Lions	2	20	0.1
2	Zachary Bates	Northcote City	2	21	0.09
