= 2021 Football Victoria season =

Football Victoria
- Season: 2021

The 2021 season is the 110th season of competitive association football in Victoria.

The season was disrupted due to the impacts from the COVID-19 pandemic in Australia, with the season being suspended in August 2021 from government-imposed lockdowns, and cancelled in September. No Premiers were declared, and promotion and relegation was suspended until the following season.

However, as a result of a court challenge involving Avondale FC and Football Victoria, it was agreed that eight rounds of games from the 2022 NPL Season would also count towards the 2021 NPL league table, enabling sufficient matches to be played to "complete" the season, and be able to declare a Premier.

== League tables ==
=== 2021 National Premier Leagues Victoria ===
National Premier Leagues Victoria
- Season: 2021
- Champions: Oakleigh Cannons
- Relegated: None
- All statistics correct as of 26 July 2022.

In addition to the season being cancelled in September, the 2021 National Premier Leagues finals series was also cancelled (the NPL Premier normally qualifies for the national NPL finals series). With the resumption of games for the 2022 season, a select number of rounds and matches would also count towards the league table for the 2021 season, so that after 26 rounds a Premier could be declared.

Oakleigh Cannons were crowned as Premiers on 26 July 2022.

==== Initial Table (2021) ====
Pos	Team	Pld	W	D	L	GF	GA	GD	Pts
1	Avondale	18	12	5	1	39	15	+24	41
2	Oakleigh Cannons	18	10	4	4	36	21	+15	34
3	Bentleigh Greens	18	10	3	5	31	22	+9	33
4	Hume City	18	9	4	5	37	21	+16	31
5	Dandenong Thunder	18	8	4	6	30	25	+5	28
6	Heidelberg United	18	7	6	5	23	22	+1	27
7	Melbourne Knights	18	7	5	6	24	26	−2	26
8	South Melbourne	18	6	7	5	19	18	+1	25
9	Green Gully	18	5	5	8	23	25	−2	20
10	Eastern Lions	18	4	3	11	18	34	−16	15
11	Altona Magic	18	2	8	8	19	32	−13	14
12	Dandenong City	18	3	5	10	20	36	−16	14
13	St Albans Saints	18	2	4	12	10	39	−29	10
14	Port Melbourne	18	7	5	6	28	21	+7	8 (Note: Port Melbourne were retrospectively deducted 18 points for breach of NPL licensing conditions.)

Source: mygameday
Rules for classification: 1) Points; 2) Goal difference; 3) Goals scored

==== Additional Matches (2022) ====
Pos	Team	Pld	W	D	L	GF	GA	GD	Pts
1	South Melbourne	8	8	0	0	22	7	+15	24
2	Port Melbourne	8	7	1	0	18	4	+14	22
3	Oakleigh Cannons	8	5	1	2	15	9	+6	16
4	Altona Magic	8	4	2	2	9	6	+3	14
5	Dandenong Thunder	8	4	1	3	13	9	+4	13
6	Green Gully	8	4	1	3	11	9	+2	13
7	Heidelberg United	8	3	2	3	12	14	−2	11
8	Bentleigh Greens	8	3	1	4	12	11	+1	10
9	Melbourne Knights	8	3	1	4	9	10	−1	10
10	Avondale	8	2	1	5	15	18	−3	7
11	Hume City	8	2	1	5	7	13	−6	7
12	Dandenong City	8	1	2	5	8	13	−5	5
13	St Albans Saints	8	1	2	5	5	16	−11	5
14	Eastern Lions	8	0	2	6	6	23	−17	2

Rules for classification: 1) Points; 2) Goal difference; 3) Goals scored

==== Final Table (2021 and 2022) ====
Pos	Team	Pld	W	D	L	GF	GA	GD	Pts	Qualification or relegation
1	Oakleigh Cannons	26	15	5	6	51	30	+21	50	Declared as 2021 Premiers after additional matches in 2022
2	South Melbourne	26	14	7	5	41	25	+16	49	
3	Avondale	26	14	6	6	54	33	+21	48	
4	Bentleigh Greens	26	13	4	9	43	33	+10	43	
5	Dandenong Thunder	26	12	5	9	43	34	+9	41	
6	Hume City	26	11	5	10	44	34	+10	38	
7	Heidelberg United	26	10	8	8	35	36	−1	38	
8	Melbourne Knights	26	10	6	10	33	36	−3	36	
9	Green Gully	26	9	6	11	34	34	0	33	
10	Port Melbourne	26	14	6	6	46	25	+21	30 (Note: Port Melbourne were retrospectively deducted 18 points for breach of NPL licensing conditions.)	
11	Altona Magic	26	6	10	10	28	38	−10	28	
12	Dandenong City	26	4	7	15	28	49	−21	19	
13	Eastern Lions	26	4	5	17	24	57	−33	17	
14	St Albans Saints	26	3	6	17	15	55	−40	15	

Source: mygameday
Rules for classification: 1) Points; 2) Goal difference; 3) Goals scored

=== 2021 National Premier Leagues Victoria 2 ===
NPL Victoria 2
- Season: 2021
- Champions: None
- Premiers: None
- Relegated: None

Pos	Team	Pld	W	D	L	GF	GA	GD	Pts
1	Brunswick City	13	9	3	1	25	15	+10	30
2	Pascoe Vale	14	8	3	3	29	18	+11	27
3	Northcote City	14	6	4	4	25	19	+6	22
4	Goulburn Valley Suns	14	7	1	6	22	17	+5	22
5	Kingston City	14	7	1	6	31	28	+3	22
6	Langwarrin	14	6	4	4	17	16	+1	22
7	North Geelong Warriors	14	4	6	4	27	27	0	18
8	Moreland Zebras	13	5	3	5	18	18	0	18
9	Moreland City	14	4	5	5	26	20	+6	17
10	Bulleen Lions	14	5	0	9	15	28	−13	15
11	Manningham United	14	2	4	8	24	36	−12	10
12	Werribee City	14	2	2	10	18	35	−17	8

Source: mygameday
Rules for classification: 1) Points; 2) Goal difference; 3) Goals scored

=== 2021 National Premier Leagues Victoria 3 ===
NPL Victoria 3
- Season: 2021
- Champions: None
- Premiers: None
- Relegated: None

Pos	Team	Pld	W	D	L	GF	GA	GD	Pts
1	Preston Lions	14	9	3	2	34	14	+20	30
2	Doveton	14	10	0	4	32	27	+5	30
3	Western United Youth	14	8	5	1	31	18	+13	29
4	Box Hill United	14	8	2	4	29	19	+10	26
5	Melbourne City Youth	14	8	1	5	37	19	+18	25
6	Melbourne Victory Youth	14	5	6	3	26	16	+10	21
7	Nunawading City	14	7	0	7	31	29	+2	21
8	Geelong	14	5	3	6	23	19	+4	18
9	North Sunshine Eagles	14	4	2	8	33	34	−1	14
10	Whittlesea Ranges	14	3	2	9	13	34	−21	11
11	Springvale White Eagles	14	2	3	9	19	37	−18	9
12	Ballarat City	14	1	1	12	12	54	−42	4

Source: mygameday
Rules for classification: 1) Points; 2) Goal difference; 3) Goals scored

== Women's football ==
=== 2021 National Premier Leagues Victoria Women ===
Pos	Team	Pld	W	D	L	GF	GA	GD	Pts
1	South Melbourne	12	11	0	1	53	13	+40	33
2	Bulleen Lions	12	9	1	2	42	18	+24	28
3	Calder United	12	8	1	3	38	11	+27	25
4	Victorian Women's NTC	12	7	1	4	28	18	+10	22
5	Alamein FC	12	4	3	5	19	26	−7	15
6	Heidelberg United	12	4	1	7	23	36	−13	13
7	Box Hill United	12	1	1	10	12	40	−28	4
8	Bayside United	12	0	0	12	6	59	−53	0

Source: mygameday
Rules for classification: 1) points; 2) goal difference; 3) number of goals scored.

== Cup Competitions ==
=== 2021 Dockerty Cup ===
Football Victoria soccer clubs competed in 2021 for the Dockerty Cup. The tournament doubled as the Victorian qualifiers for the 2021 FFA Cup, with the top four clubs progressing to the Round of 32. A total of 210 clubs entered the qualifying phase, with the clubs entering in a staggered format.

The Cup was won by Avondale FC, their first title.

In addition to the three A-League clubs (Melbourne Victory, Melbourne City and Western United), the four semi-finalists (Avondale FC, Hume City, Port Melbourne and South Melbourne) competed in the final rounds of the 2021 FFA Cup.
