= Sebastian Esposito =

Australian soccer player (born 2005)

Personal information
- Date of birth: 21 April 2005 (age 21)
- Place of birth: Melbourne, Victoria, Australia
- Height: 1.88 m (6 ft 2 in)
- Position: Central defender

Team information
- Current team: Lecce

Youth career
- –2023: Melbourne City FC
- 2024–: Lecce

Senior career*
Years	Team	Apps	(Gls)
2022–2023	Melbourne City	6	(0)
2024–	Lecce	0	(0)
2025–2026	→ Melbourne Victory (loan)	24	(2)

International career^{‡}
2023–2024	Australia U20	15	(0)
2024–	Australia U23	6	(0)
- * Club domestic league appearances and goals as of 30 July 2026 ‡ National team caps and goals as of 6 October 2025

Sebastian Esposito (Italian: [seˈbastjan eˈspɔːzito]; born 21 April 2005) is an Australian professional soccer player who plays as a central defender for Serie A club Lecce. He is an Australia youth international.

== Club career ==
Esposito was born in Melbourne and developed in the academies of Melbourne City before moving to Italy to join Serie A side Lecce in January 2024. He quickly became a starter and captain for Lecce's U20s, regularly included on the bench for the Serie A senior team in matches against top Italian clubs. In August 2025, he returned to Australia, signing on loan with Melbourne Victory FC to gain senior experience in the A-League Men.

== International career ==
Esposito captained the Australia U20s to their maiden AFC U20 Asian Cup title, and was later called up to the Australia U23s. In May 2025, he attended the Socceroos’ senior training camp.

== Personal life ==
Esposito was born in Australia to a half-Italian father, and half-Greek mother.

== Style of play ==
Standing at 1.88 m, Esposito is known as a physically dominant, right-footed centre-back. He is praised for his leadership, aerial ability, and composure on the ball, captaining at both club and international youth levels.

== Career statistics ==
=== Club ===
As of 5 September 2025

Appearances and goals by club, season and competition
Club	Season	League	Apps	Goals	Other	Apps	Goals	Total	Apps	Goals
Melbourne City	2022–2023	A-League Men	6	0	–	–	6	0		
Lecce	2024–2025	Serie A	0	0	–	–	0	0		
Melbourne Victory (loan)	2025–	A-League Men	1	0	–	–	1	0		
Total			7	0	–	–	7	0		

== Honours ==
Australia U20

- AFC U20 Asian Cup: 2025 (captain)
