= 2025 National Premier Leagues Victoria Men's =

Current ongoing season of National Premier Leagues Victoria

National Premier Leagues Victoria
- Season: 2025
- Dates: 6 February – 14 September 2025
- Champions: Heidelberg United
- Premiers: Avondale FC
- Relegated: Melbourne Victory Youth; Port Melbourne; Melbourne Knights
- Matches: 182
- Goals: 601 (3.3 per match)
- Biggest home win: Dandenong City 7–1 Melbourne Knights (16 Aug 2025); Dandenong Thunder 6–0 Altona Magic (7 Jun 2025)
- Biggest away win: Green Gully 0–5 Dandenong City (7 Mar 2025)
- Longest winning run: 6 – Avondale (Feb 7 – Mar 22)
- All statistics correct as of 2025-08-24.

The 2025 National Premier Leagues Victoria season was the 117th season of the National Premier Leagues Victoria (NPL) season, the highest level of football in the state of Victoria, and the 12th since the competition was rebadged. The season began on the 6th of February, and ended on the 14th September.

The defending champions are Oakleigh Cannons, who had defeated the reigning premiers South Melbourne in the 2024 National Premier Leagues Victoria grand final.

Avondale were the premiers after finishing four points clear after winning the league, however Heidelberg United qualify for the 2025 Australian Championship as second-placed due to Avondale being 'foundation members' of the spring competition. Heidelberg United were the champions after defeating sixth-placed Dandenong City 2-1 in the Grand Final.

== Teams ==
=== Pre-season changes ===
2024 League	Promoted to league	Relegated from league
NPL Victoria	Preston Lions; Melbourne Victory Youth	Manningham United Blues; Moreland City

Ref.

=== Stadiums and locations ===
Locations of 2025 NPL Victoria clubs within metropolitan Melbourne

Team	Head Coach	Location	Stadium	Capacity
Altona Magic	Goran Lozanovski	Melbourne (Altona North)	Paisley Park	5,000
Avondale FC	Zoran Markovski	Melbourne (Parkville)	Avenger Park	1,000
Dandenong City	Nick Tolios	Melbourne (Endeavour Hills)	Frank Holohan Soccer Complex	4,000
Dandenong Thunder	Adam Piddick	Melbourne (Dandenong)	George Andrews Reserve	5,000
Green Gully	David Chick	Melbourne (Keilor Downs)	Green Gully Reserve	10,000
Heidelberg United	John Anastasiadis	Melbourne (Heidelberg West)	Olympic Village	12,000
Hume City	Nick Hegarty	Melbourne (Broadmeadows)	Hume City Stadium	3,000
Melbourne Knights	Marijan Cvitković	Melbourne (Sunshine North)	Knights Stadium	15,000
Melbourne Victory (Youth)	Boris Seroshtan	Melbourne (Bundoora)	The Home of the Matildas	3,000
Oakleigh Cannons	Chris Taylor	Melbourne (Oakleigh)	Jack Edwards Reserve	4,000
Port Melbourne	Maxim Gaydovskiy	Melbourne (Port Melbourne)	JL Murphy Reserve	1,000
Preston Lions	Louie Acevski	Melbourne (Reservoir)	B.T. Connor Reserve	6,500
South Melbourne	Sinisa Cohadzic	Melbourne (Albert Park)	Lakeside Stadium	12,000
St Albans Saints	Cameron Watson	Melbourne (St Albans)	Churchill Reserve	3,500

=== Managerial changes ===
Team	Outgoing manager	Manner of departure	Date of vacancy	Position in table	Incoming manager	Date of appointment
South Melbourne	Esteban Quintas	Sacked	14 April 2025	11th	Sinisa Cohadzic	5 May 2025
Melbourne Knights	Ivan Franjic	Resigned	5 May 2025	13th	John Markovski	18 May 2025
Port Melbourne Sharks	John Markovski	Mutual Agreement	7 May 2025	14th	Maxim Gaydovskiy	15 May 2025
Hume City FC	Riccardo Marchioli	Sacked	5 June 2025	6th	Nick Hegarty	13 June 2025
Melbourne Knights	John Markovski	Sacked	29 July 2025	14th	Marijan Cvitković	29 July 2025

== Regular season ==
=== League table ===
Pos	Team	Pld	W	D	L	GF	GA	GD	Pts	Promotion, qualification or relegation
1	Avondale FC (Note: Team pre-qualified to the Australian Championship as a Foundation club.)	26	19	4	3	66	27	+39	61	Qualification to Finals series
2	Heidelberg United (C, Q)	26	17	6	3	55	25	+30	57	Qualification to Australian Championship and Finals series (Note: The second-placed team qualified to the Australian Championship since the Premier is one of the three NPL Victoria teams that have already qualified as "Foundation Clubs".)
3	Dandenong Thunder	26	16	5	5	60	32	+28	53	Qualification to Finals series
4	Oakleigh Cannons	26	15	4	7	58	33	+25	49	Qualification to Finals series
5	Preston Lions	26	14	5	7	40	28	+12	47	Qualification to Finals series
6	Dandenong City	26	10	10	6	51	38	+13	40	Qualification to Finals series
7	Hume City	26	11	5	10	42	40	+2	38	
8	Green Gully	26	8	7	11	39	42	−3	31	
9	South Melbourne	26	7	7	12	29	46	−17	28	
10	Altona Magic	26	7	6	13	28	38	−10	27	
11	St Albans Saints	26	7	6	13	45	56	−11	27	
12	Melbourne Victory Youth (R)	26	5	3	18	36	60	−24	18	Relegation to Victorian Premier League 1
13	Port Melbourne (R)	26	4	5	17	24	64	−40	17	Relegation to Victorian Premier League 1
14	Melbourne Knights (R)	26	4	3	19	28	72	−44	15	Relegation to Victorian Premier League 1

Source: MyGameday
Rules for classification: 1) points; 2) goal difference; 3) number of goals scored; 4) aggregate head-to-head results; 5) away goals; 6) alphabetical order/coin toss at the end of the season.
(C) Champions; (Q) Qualified for the phase indicated; (R) Relegated

=== Matches ===
Home \ Away	ALT	AVO	DCI	DTH	GGL	HEI	HUM	KNI	MVC	OAK	POR	PRL	SMB	SAL
Altona Magic	—	0–1	0–0	0–1	0–0	0–2	1–1	4–0	1–0	1–2	4–0	0–2	0–0	2–1
Avondale FC	4–0	—	1–1	1–1	2–1	2–1	2–0	5–1	4–1	3–0	4–1	3–1	4–0	2–2
Dandenong City	2–1	0–3	—	1–2	0–0	0–2	1–3	7–1	3–1	1–0	5–2	2–2	3–3	3–3
Dandenong Thunder	6–0	2–1	2–2	—	2–1	3–2	1–1	4–0	4–1	3–3	5–1	3–0	1–0	2–2
Green Gully	2–3	5–2	0–5	3–1	—	0–3	1–1	3–0	4–1	1–1	0–0	0–1	1–0	2–2
Heidelberg United	3–1	3–1	2–2	2–0	4–1	—	5–1	2–1	1–0	1–1	2–1	1–1	1–1	2–2
Hume City	2–0	1–2	3–0	2–1	3–2	0–1	—	2–1	1–2	0–3	4–1	0–1	1–1	3–2
Melbourne Knights	1–5	1–3	0–2	0–3	1–4	3–2	1–1	—	1–2	3–3	3–0	0–1	0–2	3–1
Melbourne Victory Youth	1–1	2–3	0–3	3–4	1–2	0–3	2–3	1–2	—	0–3	1–2	1–1	3–3	3–2
Oakleigh Cannons	1–0	1–2	3–0	3–1	3–1	1–2	4–0	3–0	2–5	—	4–1	4–0	3–0	1–2
Port Melbourne	3–3	0–1	1–1	0–2	1–0	2–2	1–3	2–2	0–3	0–2	—	3–2	0–1	0–2
Preston Lions	1–0	1–1	1–1	2–0	3–2	0–1	2–1	3–0	1–0	2–3	5–0	—	2–0	2–1
South Melbourne	2–0	0–5	1–3	0–1	1–1	0–3	2–1	3–1	4–2	1–2	0–2	2–1	—	0–3
St Albans Saints	0–1	1–4	1–3	1–5	1–2	1–2	0–4	4–2	3–1	3–2	3–0	0–3	2–2	—

Source: MyGameday
Legend: Blue = home team win; Yellow = draw; Red = away team win.

== Finals series ==
=== Bracket ===
Elimination finals
3	Dandenong Thunder	0
6	Dandenong City	1
4	Oakleigh Cannons	1
5	Preston Lions	2

Preliminary finals
1	Avondale FC	0
6	Dandenong City	1
2	Heidelberg United	2
5	Preston Lions	1

Grand final
6	Dandenong City	1
2	Heidelberg United	2

== Statistics ==
=== Goals ===
Rank	Player	Team	Goals
1	Bul Juach	Heidelberg United	22
2	Joe Guest	Oakleigh Cannons	15
3	Kenny Athiu	Dandenong City	13
3	Manyluak Aguek	Avondale	13
5	Hassan Jalloh	Dandenong Thunder	12

=== Discipline ===
==== Yellow cards ====
Correct as of 7 July 2025

Rank	Player	Team	Cards
1	Birkan Kirdar	Hume City	9
1	Gideon Arok	St Albans Saints	9
1	Joseph Colina	St Albans Saints	9
3	Stefan Valentini	Avondale	8

==== Red cards ====
As of 7 July 2025, there are twenty-seven players with 1 red card.

=== Hat-tricks ===
Player	For	Against	Result	Date	Ref.
Asahi Yokokawa	Heidelberg United	Hume City	5–1 (H)	14 March 2025	
Kenny Athiu	Dandenong City	Port Melbourne Sharks	5–2 (H)	25 April 2025	
Aamir Abdallah	Green Gully	Avondale	5–2 (H)	9 May 2025	
Kenny Athiu	Dandenong City	Melbourne Knights	7-1 (H)	16 August 2025	

Notes

- (H) – Home team
- (A) – Away team
