= Brunswick City SC =

Brunswick City
- Full name: Brunswick City Soccer Club
- Nickname: Leonidas
- Founded: 1970
- Ground: Dunstan Reserve, Brunswick West
- President: Lou Kastanos
- Manager: Nick Kyriopoulos
- League: Victoria Premier League 1
- 2026: 10th of 14
- Website: http://www.brunswickcitysc.com.au/
Home colours	Away colours

Brunswick City Soccer Club is a soccer club from Brunswick West, a suburb of Melbourne, Victoria, Australia.

The club was formed in 1970 by local Greek Australians as Thornbury Soccer Club and today has teams playing in Senior Men's, Senior Women's and Junior competitions. Brunswick City currently participates in the Victoria Premier League 1.

== History ==
Brunswick City's foundations can be traced to the early 1970 when a group of Greek migrants got together for a friendly game of soccer in Thornbury. Eventually a club was established, which due to the Victorian Soccer Federation regionalisation policy, was initially known as Thornbury Soccer Club. In 1980 a new base was formed in Brunswick where the club took on its new name of Brunswick City "Leonidas" Soccer Club inspired by the Spartan Warrior.

The team initially played all home games from Royal Park, oval no.9. A move was made to Balfe Park in East Brunswick. With the development of a Junior program came the need for bigger and better facilities, hence the move to Dunstan Reserve, Brunswick West.

The club's first president was Nick Koutoulis, a key early member who saw the team play in a Sunday league division. The club gained entry into the District League and was eventually promoted through the divisions of the Provisional League right through to State League 1.

=== State League Era ===
The defining moment for Brunswick City arguably came in 2001 when the club gained promotion into the Victorian State League System. The promotion into the State Leagues was typically a tipping point for clubs to pay players and become more professional in their administration and competition intent.

Brunswick quickly moved up the Victorian football pyramid winning promotion three times in four years in what can be considered the club's golden era. The club has since been able to sustain itself at this level of competition and has never since played below the 3rd level of State competition.

=== National Premier League Era ===
Brunswick City SC had their bid for a place in the National Premier Leagues Victoria accepted early on in 2014 and were placed into the NPL1 competition, the second tier of football in Victoria. The 2014 season was a difficult one for City, finishing bottom of the inaugural 14 team NPL1 campaign, managing just 10 points from 26 games.

The following season, the NPL1 was split into an East and West conference following the inclusion of six more teams. Brunswick were placed into the West conference for the 2015 season. It faced teams within this conference twice. It also competed against the 10 team East conference, facing each team once. The club had another disappointing campaign, finishing bottom of the NPL1 West conference, but avoided relegation despite consecutive bottom place finishes by virtue of no relegation out of the NPL1.

George Karkaletsis was appointed as head coach for the 2016 campaign where Brunswick were moved from the Western conference into the East. An overhaul occurred which saw a new team built and was an instant success as George Karkaletsis led his side to 5th, just a single point behind 3rd and 4th positions in the East conference.

The season that followed saw the club reverted into the Western conference. During the 2017 campaign the club had endured mixed results, with key personnel missing for extended periods of season along with player departures including the club's top goalscorer in the NPL era, Adam Wright. This saw an injection of young players, and despite fielding a relatively young team, Brunswick concluded the season in 6th position.

After consecutive losses to Werribee City in the Catch-Up Round and Round 26 in 2018, the Spartans and Karkaletsis parted ways. Director of Football Riccardo Marchioli took over on an interim basis until the last round of the 2018 season, with Brunswick sitting in 8th place, and just surviving the relegation zone. Marchioli was appointed as the permanent coach and begun a recruitment campaign looking for young players to build a legacy at Brunswick City

The 2019 season started with a lot of hope and new players, however with injuries and a tough campaign, the club again ended up mid table. The team showed promise and played creative attacking football, with a number of young players given senior debuts.

The 2020 season was cancelled due to the COVID-19 worldwide pandemic. During the 2021 pre-season, the senior coach Riccardo Marchioli was offered a position on the coaching staff of an A-league side, so he tendered his resignation. The assistant coach Ricardo Martinez took over on a permanent basis heading into the 2021 season, with Alex Cobo chosen to be his assistant coach. The two Colombian born and bred coaches brought some South American flair into the team. A big pre-season signing was ex-young Socceroo and ex Melbourne Victory player, Jesse Makarounas, who was brought in to provide some attacking midfield strength to the side.

The 2021 season begun with many victories, and belief in the side was very strong. However the COVID-19 pandemic firstly postponed the league and then finally the league was cancelled, with Brunswick City clearly on top of the table, with only 1 loss from 13 games. Football Victoria chose to nullify the current league standings and said that the league season would be abandoned without a league champion awarded for 2021.

=== Divisional History ===
Season	League	Position	Wins	Draws	Losses	Points	Cup
2021	National Premier League Victoria 2	1st	9	3	1	30	Round 3
2020	National Premier League Victoria 2 - COVID-19	x	x	x	x	x	Round 0
2019	National Premier League Victoria 2 West	6th	11	7	10	40	Round 4
2018	National Premier League Victoria 2 West	8th	9	6	13	33	Round 4
2017	National Premier League Victoria 2 West	6th	10	6	12	36	Round 4
2016	National Premier League Victoria 2 East	5th	11	11	6	43	Round 4
2015	National Premier League Victoria 1 West	10th	5	4	19	19	Round 5
2014	National Premier League Victoria 1	14th	3	1	22	10	Round 4
2013	Victorian State League 2 North-West	4th	13	4	5	43	Round 3
2012	Victorian State League 2 North-West	3rd	11	5	6	38	N/A
2011	Victorian State League 2 North-West	3rd	14	3	5	42	Round 2
2010	Victorian State League 2 North-West	8th	9	4	9	30	N/A
2009	Victorian State League 2 North-West	6th	6	8	8	26	N/A
2008	Victorian State League 2 North-West	5th	9	7	6	34	N/A
2007	Victorian State League 1	9th	6	6	10	24	N/A
2006	Victorian State League 1	9th	6	6	10	24	N/A
2005	Victorian State League 1	6th	8	7	7	31	N/A
2004	Victorian State League 2 North-West	1st	16	3	3	51	Round 4
2003	Victorian State League 2 North-West	5th	8	5	9	29	N/A
2002	Victorian State League 3 South-East	1st	14	6	2	48	N/A
2001	Victorian Provisional League 1 South-East	2nd	15	5	2	50	N/A
2000	Victorian Provisional League 1 South-East	3rd	14	2	6	44	N/A

- Competition information up to 2011 was sourced from OzFootball
- Brunswick City was deducted 3 points in the 2011 season
- Brunswick City did not play one game in the 2010 season. The result was recorded as a 0–0 draw with no points awarded to either team
- There was no cup competition from 1996 to 2011, with the exception of 2004
- Brunswick City did not play one game in the 2016 season. The result was recorded as a 0–0 draw with no points awarded to either team

== Dunstan Reserve ==
Dunstan Reserve is the home of Brunswick City's football and administration operations. The facility includes two full sizes football pitches and club rooms equipped with change rooms, storage spaces, a functioning kitchen/canteen and social area.

The main pitch is a permanent football ground and served by basic terracing and seating provided by the club rooms. Temporary undercover seating and terracing hold up to 100 spectators. The ground is open and allows for up to 1000 people to enjoy match day comfortably.

The secondary pitch is situated within a larger oval, complete with concrete cricket pitch and cricket nets used in the summer. During football season the pitch is converted to a rectangular configuration and used for junior training and matches.

== Colours and badge ==
Brunswick City's old logo in use until 2015

Brunswick City's identity is very much reflective in its Hellenic heritage. The club logo depicts Spartan warrior Leonidas in blue and white. The club changed its logo in 2015.

The club's traditional playing colours are blue and white.

== Honours ==
- 2004 Victorian State League 2 North-West Champions
- 2004 Hellenic Cup Runners Up
- 2002 Victorian State League 3 South-East Champions
- 2001 Victorian Provisional League 1 North-West Runners Up
- 2001 Victorian Provisional League Cup Champions
- 2000 Victorian Provisional League Cup Champions
- 1998 Victorian Provisional League 2 North-West Champions
- 1998 Victorian Provisional League Cup Champions
- 1994 Victorian Provisional League Cup Runners Up
- 1985 Victorian Provisional League 3 North-West Champions
- 1978 Victorian District League Division 2 Champions

Honours sourced from official Brunswick City website

== Former notable players ==
- Theo Markelis: Former Melbourne Victory player and Brunswick City Junior
- George Mells: – Former Adelaide United player and Brunswick City Junior
- Idrus Abdulahi: – Former Melbourne City player and Brunswick City Junior, and youngest ever A-League player to make a senior debut
- Anthony Pantazopoulos: – Current Western Sydney Warriors player, Brunswick City Junior and Brunswick City Seniors
- Charbel Shamoon: – Current Perth Glory player, former Western United player and Brunswick City Junior
