= 2009 Victorian Premier League =

Victorian Premier League
- Season: 2009
- Teams: 12 (+1)
- Champions: Altona Magic SC
- Premiers: Dandenong Thunder SC
- Relegated: Whittlesea Zebras; Preston Lions

The 2009 Victorian Premier League season was held between February and September 2009.

== Teams ==
Victorian Premier League teams for the 2009 season:

Club	Stadium	Capacity
Altona Magic SC	Paisley Park Soccer Complex	5,000
Dandenong Thunder SC	George Andrews Reserve	5,000
Green Gully SC	Green Gully Reserve	10,000
Heidelberg United FC	Olympic Village	10,000
Hume City FC	John Ilhan Memorial Reserve	5,000
Melbourne Knights FC	Knights Stadium (Melbourne)	15,000
Oakleigh Cannons FC	Jack Edwards Reserve	5,000
Preston Lions FC	B.T. Connor Reserve	8,000
Richmond SC	Kevin Bartlett Reserve	5,000
South Melbourne FC	Bob Jane Stadium	14,000
Sunshine George Cross FC	Chaplin Reserve	5,000
Whittlesea Zebras FC	Epping Stadium	10,000

=== Promotion and relegation ===
Teams promoted from Division 1:
(After the end of the 2008 season.)

- Dandenong Thunder SC
- Sunshine George Cross FC

Teams relegated to Division 1:
(After the end of the 2008 season.)

- Fawkner Blues SC
- Frankston Pines FC
- Western Suburbs SC

Teams ceasing competition
(After the end of the 2008 season.)

- Australian Institute of Sport

== League table ==
The regular season concluded on 15 August.

Pos	Team	Pld	W	D	L	GF	GA	GD	Pts	Qualification or relegation
1	Dandenong Thunder	22	15	5	2	45	21	+24	50	Victorian Premier League Finals
2	Altona Magic (C)	22	11	5	6	36	26	+10	38	Victorian Premier League Finals
3	Green Gully	22	11	5	6	29	21	+8	38	Victorian Premier League Finals
4	Hume City	22	11	4	7	39	16	+23	37	Victorian Premier League Finals
5	South Melbourne	22	10	7	5	41	22	+19	37	Victorian Premier League Finals
6	Heidelberg United	22	10	4	8	35	26	+9	34	
7	Oakleigh Cannons	22	9	6	7	24	22	+2	33	
8	Sunshine George Cross	22	8	8	6	18	18	0	32	
9	Melbourne Knights	22	7	6	9	26	25	+1	27	
10	Richmond	22	7	3	12	28	31	−3	24	
11	Whittlesea Zebras	22	2	4	16	15	42	−27	10	Relegation to Vic State League Div 1
12	Preston Lions	22	2	1	19	14	80	−66	7	Relegation to Vic State League Div 1

Rules for classification: 1) points; 2) goal difference; 3) number of goals scored.
(C) Champions

== Finals Series ==
=== Qualifying Final ===
2009-08-22
17:30 UTC+10

Altona Magic SC	3–3 (AET) (4–3 PSO)	Green Gully SC
Slave Bozinovski 42'; Nicholas Kalmar 72'; Carl Recchia 75'	Report	Mathew Sanders 6'; Pablo Cardozo 38'; Aziz Behich 94'

Paisley Park Soccer Complex,
Altona North, Victoria

=== Elimination Final ===
2009-08-23
15:00 UTC+10

Hume City FC	2–0	South Melbourne FC
Alfonso Opazo 2'; Andrew Vlahos 47'	Report

Epping Stadium,
Epping, Victoria

=== Minor Semi-Final ===
2009-08-29
15:00 UTC+10

Green Gully SC	0–1	Hume City FC
	Report	Tansel Başer 25'

Green Gully Reserve,
Keilor Downs, Victoria

=== Major Semi-Final ===
2009-08-30
15:00 UTC+10

Dandenong Thunder SC	0–1	Altona Magic SC
	Report	Kliment Taseski 56'

George Andrews Reserve,
Dandenong, Victoria

=== Preliminary final ===
2009-09-06
15:00 UTC+10

Dandenong Thunder SC	3–1	Hume City FC
Veton Korcarevski 9'; Hamlet Armenian 46'; Joseph Di Iorio 49'	Report	Isyan Erdogan 62'

Bob Jane Stadium,
Albert Park, Victoria

=== Grand final ===
2009-09-12
15:00 UTC+10

Altona Magic SC	1–1 (AET) (5–4 PSO)	Dandenong Thunder SC
Nicholas Kalmar 65'	Report	Veton Korcarevski 51'

Bob Jane Stadium,
Albert Park, Victoria

== Victoria Men's Team 2009 ==
A Victoria Men's Team consisting of Victorian Premier League players formed to compete against Melbourne Victory for two Victorian bushfire charity appeals matches. The games were scheduled for 12 May and 20 May. Victoria coach Chris Taylor stated that the players were selected "on the basis that some...may go on to play in the national competition in the future."

The players selected to represent Victoria were:

Note: Flags indicate national team as defined under FIFA eligibility rules; some limited exceptions apply. Players may hold more than one non-FIFA nationality.

No.	Pos.	Nation	Player
1	GK	AUS	Peter Zoïs (Richmond SC)
2	DF	AUS	Jack Hingert (Dandenong Thunder SC)
3	DF	AUS	Erhan Karahan (Richmond SC)
4	DF	AUS	Steven O'Dor (South Melbourne FC)
5	FW	AUS	Ryan Davidson (Dandenong Thunder SC)
6	MF	AUS	Dimitri Tsiaras (Richmond SC)
7	MF	AUS	Mate Dugandžić (Melbourne Knights FC)
8	DF	AUS	Matthew Grbesa (Melbourne Knights FC)
9	MF	AUS	Hamlet Armenian (Dandenong Thunder SC)

No.	Pos.	Nation	Player
10	FW	NGR	Osagie Ederaro (Heidelberg United FC)
11	MF	AUS	Joseph Youssef (South Melbourne FC)
12	DF	AUS	Shane Nunes (South Melbourne FC)
13	GK	AUS	Scott Webster (Oakleigh Cannons FC)
14	DF	AUS	Ramazan Tavşancıoğlu (South Melbourne FC)
15	MF	ENG	Graham Hockless (Heidelberg United FC)
16	MF	AUS	Frankie Lagana (Melbourne Knights FC)
17	FW	AUS	Joel Nikolic (Green Gully SC)
18	GK	AUS	Peter Gavalas (Heidelberg United FC)

2009-05-12
19:30 UTC+10

Melbourne Victory	2–0	Victorian Premier League Team
Ney Fabiano; Nathan Elasi	Report

Olympic Park Stadium,
Melbourne, Victoria
Attendance: 2,000

2009-05-20
19:30 UTC+10

Victorian Premier League Team	3–1	Melbourne Victory
Joel Nikolic, Osagie Ederaro	Report	Tom Pondeljak

Mansion Stadium,
Sunshine North, Victoria
Attendance: 1,000

2009-07-04
14:00 UTC+10

Melbourne Victory	3–0	Victorian Premier League Team
Leigh Broxham; Nathan Elasi; Kliment Taseski	Report

Deakin Reserve,
Shepparton, Victoria
Attendance: 2,000

== See also ==
- Victorian Premier League
- Football Federation Victoria
- National Premier Leagues Victoria
