= 2008 Victorian Premier League =

Victorian Premier League
- Season: 2008
- Champions: Altona Magic
- Premiers: Green Gully
- Relegated: Western Suburbs; Fawkner Blues; Frankston Pines
- Matches: 189
- Goals: 494 (2.61 per match)
- Top goalscorer: Pablo Cardozo (21 goals)

The 2008 Victorian Premier League (also known as the 2008 Foxtel Cup for sponsorship reasons) is the 97th season of top-tier football in Victoria. It began on 15 February 2008 and ended on 21 September 2008. Preston Lions was the defending champion.

== Teams ==
Team	Home city	Home ground
Altona Magic	Altona North	Paisley Park Soccer Complex
Australian Institute of Sport	Canberra	Australian Institute of Sport
Coburg United	Coburg	Knights Stadium
Fawkner Blues	Fawkner	C.B. Smith Reserve
Frankston Pines	Frankston North	Monterey Reserve
Green Gully	Melbourne	Green Gully Reserve
Heidelberg United	Heidelberg	Olympic Village
Melbourne Knights	Melbourne	Knights Stadium
Oakleigh Cannons	Oakleigh	Jack Edwards Reserve
Preston Lions	Preston	B.T. Connor Reserve
Richmond	Richmond	Kevin Bartlett Reserve
South Melbourne	South Melbourne	Lakeside Stadium
Western Suburbs	Sunshine	Ralph Reserve
Whittlesea Zebras	Whittlesea	Epping Stadium

== Standings ==
Pos	Team	Pld	W	D	L	GF	GA	GD	Pts	Qualification or relegation
1	Green Gully	26	15	8	3	41	17	+24	53	VPL 2008 Victorian Premier League Finals series
2	Melbourne Knights	26	14	10	2	47	25	+22	52	VPL 2008 Victorian Premier League Finals series
3	Altona Magic (C)	26	13	8	5	44	29	+15	47	VPL 2008 Victorian Premier League Finals series
4	Heidelberg United	26	11	9	6	41	30	+11	42	VPL 2008 Victorian Premier League Finals series
5	Richmond	26	11	7	8	57	35	+22	40	VPL 2008 Victorian Premier League Finals series
6	Preston Lions	26	12	3	11	37	46	−9	39	VPL 2008 Victorian Premier League Finals series
7	Oakleigh Cannons	26	10	7	9	28	24	+4	37	
8	Australian Institute of Sport	26	10	6	10	41	35	+6	36	
9	South Melbourne	26	10	4	12	35	32	+3	34	
10	Hume City	26	9	4	13	29	40	−11	31	
11	Whittlesea Zebras	26	7	9	10	31	33	−2	30	
12	Western Suburbs	26	5	7	14	23	42	−19	22	Relegation to Victorian State League Division 1
13	Fawkner Blues	26	6	3	17	22	59	−37	21	Relegation to Victorian State League Division 1
14	Frankston Pines	26	4	5	17	19	48	−29	17	Relegation to Victorian State League Division 1

(C) Champions

== Finals series ==
30 August Elimination final	Altona Magic	2–1	Preston Lions FC	Paisley Park Soccer Complex
	Fa'arodo 44'; Curcija 89'		Bosevski 14'	Attendance: 2,500; Referee: Laz Vassiliadis

30 August Elimination final	Heidelberg United	2–1	Richmond	John Cain Memorial Park
	Hockless 79' (pen.); Alilovic 90+3'		P. Cardozo 90+6' (pen.)	Attendance: 900; Referee: Senko Rastocic

31 August Qualifying final	Green Gully	1–1 (5–6 p)	Melbourne Knights	Green Gully Reserve
	Nikolic 18'		Franjic 19'	Attendance: 600; Referee: Sergio Terceiro
	Penalties
	Burton (penalty scored); Adam (penalty missed); Koce Delev (penalty scored); Sanders (penalty scored); Ivesic (penalty scored); Vargas (penalty scored); De Oliveira (penalty missed); Medjedovic (penalty missed)		(penalty scored) Franjic; (penalty scored) Watson; (penalty scored) Barisic; (penalty missed) Muriqi; (penalty scored) Iosifidis; (penalty scored) Elvin; (penalty missed) Timmons; (penalty scored) Kiratzoglou

6 September 2008 Minor semi-final	Green Gully	0–2	Heidelberg United	Green Gully Reserve
			Tsiorlas 16', 68'	Attendance: 600; Referee: Phil Taverna

7 September 2008 Major semi-final	Melbourne Knights	1–1 (3–4 p)	Altona Magic	Knights Stadium
	Kiratzoglou 7'		Recchia 63'	Attendance: 2,000; Referee: Perry Mur
	Penalties
	Watson (penalty missed); Barisic (penalty scored); Kiratzoglou (penalty scored); Spiteri (penalty missed); Iosifidis (penalty scored)		(penalty scored) Curcija; (penalty missed) Recchia; (penalty scored) Bozinovski; (penalty scored) Mladenovic; (penalty scored) Kalmar

14 September Preliminary final	Melbourne Knights	2–1	Heidelberg United	Epping Stadium
	Spiteri 18'; Barisic 35'		Hockless 76'	Attendance: 2,000; Referee: Bruno D'Aniello

21 September Grand Final	Altona Magic	1–0	Melbourne Knights	Lakeside Stadium
	Recchia 119'			Attendance: 5,000; Referee: Hakan Anaz

== Top goalscorers ==
Pos	Player	Club	Goals
1	(Australia) Pablo Cardozo	Richmond	21
2	(Australia) Andrew Barisic	Melbourne Knights	18
3	(Australia) Michael Curcija	Altona Magic	16
4	(Australia) Joel Nikolic	Green Gully	12
4	(Australia) Jason Naidovski	AIS	12
6	(Australia) Richard Cardozo	Richmond	10
6	(Australia) Frankie Lagana	Oakleigh Cannons	10
6	(Australia) Johnny Sapazovski	Preston Lions	10
9	(Australia) Kofi Danning	AIS	9
9	(Australia) Fernando de Moraes	South Melbourne	9
9	(England) Graham Hockless	Heidelberg United	9
9	(Australia) Jerry Karpeh	Whittlesea Zebras	9
9	(Australia) Mark Tsiorlas	Heidelberg United	9

== See also ==
- Victorian Premier League
- Football Federation Victoria
- National Premier Leagues Victoria
