= 2010 Victorian Premier League =

Victorian Premier League
- Season: 2010
- Teams: 12
- Champions: Green Gully
- Premiers: Richmond SC
- Relegated: Altona Magic; Sunshine George Cross

The 2010 Victorian Premier League season was the 99th season of the Victorian Premier League, and was contested by 12 clubs.

== Teams ==
Victorian Premier League teams for the 2010 season:

Club	Stadium	Capacity
Altona Magic SC	Paisley Park Soccer Complex	5,000
Bentleigh Greens SC	Kingston Heath Soccer Complex	5,000
Dandenong Thunder SC	George Andrews Reserve	5,000
Green Gully SC	Green Gully Reserve	10,000
Heidelberg United FC	Olympic Village	10,000
Hume City FC	John Ilhan Memorial Reserve	5,000
Melbourne Knights FC	Mansion Stadium	15,000
Northcote City SC	John Cain Memorial Park	5,000
Oakleigh Cannons FC	Jack Edwards Reserve	5,000
Richmond SC	Kevin Bartlett Reserve	5,000
South Melbourne FC	Bob Jane Stadium	14,000
Sunshine George Cross FC	Mansion Stadium	15,000

=== Promotion and relegation ===
Teams promoted from Division 1:
(After the end of the 2009 season.)

- Bentleigh Greens SC
- Northcote City SC

Teams relegated to Division 1:
(After the end of the 2009 season.)

- Preston Lions FC
- Whittlesea Zebras FC

== League table ==
The regular season concluded on 6 September.

Pos	Team	Pld	W	D	L	GF	GA	GD	Pts	Qualification or relegation
1	Richmond	22	12	4	6	33	26	+7	40	Victorian Premier League Finals
2	Hume City	22	12	6	4	41	29	+12	39 (Note: Hume City, Heidelberg Utd & Melbourne Knights were given a situation pending 3 point deduction as a result of failure to adhere to Rules of Competition 2009 – Section 1.6. South Melbourne lost 6 points because of an incident during the Round 6 home fixture against Heidelberg United.)	Victorian Premier League Finals
3	Green Gully (C)	22	11	3	8	37	23	+14	36	Victorian Premier League Finals
4	Heidelberg United	22	10	6	6	34	33	+1	33	Victorian Premier League Finals
5	Northcote City	22	9	4	9	47	35	+12	31	Victorian Premier League Finals
6	South Melbourne	22	10	6	6	41	28	+13	30	
7	Oakleigh Cannons	22	9	3	10	30	31	−1	30	
8	Dandenong Thunder	22	9	4	9	24	30	−6	28	
9	Melbourne Knights	22	7	5	10	30	37	−7	23	
10	Bentleigh Greens	22	5	6	11	19	36	−17	21	
11	Altona Magic	22	5	5	12	39	46	−7	20	Relegation to Vic State League Div 1
12	Sunshine George Cross	22	5	4	13	20	41	−21	19	Relegation to Vic State League Div 1

Rules for classification: 1) points; 2) goal difference; 3) number of goals scored.
(C) Champions

== See also ==
- Victorian Premier League
- Football Federation Victoria
- National Premier Leagues Victoria
