= Kliment Taseski =

Australian soccer player

Personal information
- Full name: Kliment Taseski
- Date of birth: 27 May 1991 (age 35)
- Place of birth: Melbourne, Australia
- Height: 1.75 m (5 ft 9 in)
- Position: Attacking midfielder

Team information
- Current team: Green Gully

Youth career
- 2007–2008: VIS
- 2009–2010: Melbourne Victory

Senior career*
Years	Team	Apps	(Gls)
2009–2010	Altona Magic	25	(3)
2010–2012	Melbourne Heart	4	(0)
2011	→ South Melbourne FC (loan)	10	(1)
2012–2013	Moreland Zebras	12	(2)
2013–2014	Richmond SC	16	(2)
2014	Hume City	15	(1)
2015	FC Rosengård		
2016–2017	Green Gully	47	(3)

International career^{‡}
2008–2011	Australia U20	17	(3)
- * Club domestic league appearances and goals as of 29 September 2017 ‡ National team caps and goals as of 17:30, 20 November 2010 (UTC)

Kliment Taseski (born 27 May 1991) is an Australian footballer who last played for Green Gully SC in the National Premier Leagues Victoria.

== Early life ==
Taseski was born in Melbourne, and is the son of Macedonian former footballer Ilija Taseski, who played in the National Soccer League between 1985 and 1989. Before beginning his senior career, Taseski played junior football at Noble Park Suns, and also had short stints at VIS and South Melbourne.

== Club career ==
Taseski began his senior career with the Victorian Premier League club Altona Magic. He played a pivotal role in their side in the 2009 season, helping them to claim the championship and was awarded man of the match in the grand final.

After the 2009 VPL season, he signed with the Melbourne Victory as part of their youth squad, and made seven appearances in total in the 2009–10 season. He returned to Altona Magic for the 2010 VPL season, but shortly after the season started, he was signed by new A-League club Melbourne Heart. He made his debut in a pre-season friendly against Premier League club Everton, which the Heart lost 2–0.

He made his A-League debut on 29 August with the Melbourne Heart, coming on as a substitute against Perth Glory. Taseski made his return to the VPL at the completion of the 2010–11 A-League season, as he and fellow Heart player Kamal Ibrahim were loaned out to South Melbourne by the Heart. He scored on his début at South Melbourne, helping his side to a 6–4 win over Springvale. On 6 April 2012, it was announced that he would be leaving Melbourne Heart. After spending the remainder of Season 2012 with Moreland Zebras he signed with Victorian Premier League team Richmond Eagles for the 2013 season. After impressing with Richmond despite the club's relegation, he earned himself a move to NPL Victoria club Hume City FC for the 2014 season.

Taseski signed a 1-year contract with Swedish 2nd division club FC Rosengård 1917 midway through 2015, but departed after just six months, returning to Victoria to sign for the Arthur Papas-led Green Gully SC.

== International career ==
Taseski played for the Australian Under 20s during the qualification for the 2010 AFF U-19 Youth Championship. He played 3 times and scored a double against Cambodia in their 3–0 win.

== Honours ==
=== Club ===
with Altona Magic

- Victorian Premier League (1): 2009

with Australia

- AFF U-19 Youth Championship: 2010

=== Individual ===
- Jimmy Rooney Medal for VPL Grand Final Man of the Match: 2009
- Victorian Premier League Young Player of the Year Award: 2012
