= Springvale White Eagles FC =

Springvale White Eagles
- Full name: Springvale White Eagles Football Club
- Nicknames: Beli Orlovi, Eagles
- Founded: 1975; 51 years ago
- Ground: Serbian Sports Centre
- Capacity: 5000 (400 Seated)
- Chairman: Zivko Milovanovic
- Manager: Andrew Skledar
- League: Victoria Premier League 2
- 2026: 8th of 14
- Website: Official website
Home colours	Away colours

Springvale White Eagles Football Club is a semi-professional Australian soccer club based in Melbourne, Victoria currently playing in the Victorian Premier League 2. Founded by Serbian Australians, they play at the Serbian Sports Centre in Keysborough, Victoria.

They were founded in 1975 and were in the Victorian Premier League from 1997 to 1999, 2007 and 2011.

== History ==
Springvale White Eagles Club was formed in 1975 as Springvale United, and have been known by their current name since 1995.

In 2002 White Eagles got into the State League Cup Final, losing 4–2 to Westvale.

In June 2007, the coach Leon Gardikiotis resigned less than a month after replacing from Zoran Trajceski. The club president Zoran Stojanovic also resigned. In 2008, Springvale White Eagles appointed former Frankston Pines coach Stan Webster, who experienced little success at the club.

The club was promoted to the Victorian Premier League in 2010, but suffered relegation in their first season in the top flight in the following year.

In 2012 Springvale were relegated from State League 1, having finished bottom of the league with just 1 win in 22 league games. − They took out the State League 2 South-East title the following season, pipping Dandenong City SC by one point.

=== National Premier Leagues Victoria (2014–present) ===
The club entered the NPL Victoria 2 division for the 2014 season, the new second tier of soccer in Victoria. The club finished the season in 12th place in the 14 team league, just avoiding the relegation playoffs.

In 2015, the NPL 2 was split into an East and West division with the White Eagles competing in the East division, finishing in nineteenth place overall in the NPL1 league system. Late in October 2015, head manager Zlatko Mihajlović resigned from his position. Shortly after, Mihajlović was replaced by Boyan Mitkov as the new senior head coach. Springvale then lost key player Šimo Jovanović to Kingston City. Jovanović had spent his entire career with the White Eagles, progressing through the youth system to eventually become the club's captain. On 12 April 2016, it was announced that Mitkov and his assistant Gus Caminos (who were winless in their first seven league games in the NPL2 season) had resigned from their positions, with former White Eagles player Nik Kovacevic announced as the replacement. Springvale subsequently finished the season in 6th place in the NPL2 East, its second best-ever finish in the NPL2 competition. In November 2016, head coach Kovacevic departed the club to return to Pascoe Vale as a senior assistant coach.

Springvale White Eagles appointed former Altona Magic coach Vlado Tortevski as their new manager for the 2017 NPL2 season. Despite winning three of their opening four NPL2 league games, Tortevski's side then won just one of the following ten, leading to the departure of the head coach in May 2017. The White Eagles finished the season in 7th place.

For the 2018 season, Springvale reappointed former club coach Nik Kovacevic to lead the team, and had a total of 7 key signings in the off-season. This included the experienced central defensive partnership of Pavle Durkic (formerly at Whittlesea Ranges FC) and Milos Tošić (formerly at West Adelaide SC). Also adding to the squad were Andy Kecojević, Marcus Dimanche, Delarno Pharoe, Slaven Vranešević and Englishmen Luke Barrow. With the mid-season loss of Captain Dejan Erakovic the Eagles brought in other key signings to its squad, including Bonel Obradović, Nemanja Lojanica and Nenad Nikolic. The Eagles finished the 2018 campaign in fourth place in the NPL2 East, its best finish since the inception of the NPL in 2014.

In 2019 the club finished in last place, with just four wins in 28 games, and were relegated to NPL3 for the 2020 season. Head coach Nebojsa Vukosavljevic resigned after the club's relegation, with Springvale appointing former Socceroo John Markovski for the 2020 NPL3 campaign.

In 2024, the club finished second on the State League 1 ladder with a 3-1 victory over the Eltham Redbacks in the final game of the season, this win secured the club a return to the Victorian Premier League in 2025 after a 2 year hiatus.

== Achievements ==
League

Division	Champions	Runners Up
VIC State League 1st Division	(x2) 1996, 2010	(x2) 2006, 2024
VIC State League 2nd Division SE	(x1) 2005	
VIC State League 2nd Division	(x1) 1995	
VIC State League 3rd Division	(x1) 1992	
VIC Metropolitan League Division 4	(x1) 1984	
VIC Buffalo Provisional League Division 3		(x1) 1983
VIC Provisional League Division 4		(x1) 1982
VIC District League Division 3		(x1) 1981

Cup

Cup	Champions	Runners Up
Victorian State League Cup	–	(x1) 2002
Karadjordje Cup	(x8) 1999, 2004, 2007, 2008, 2010, 2014, 2019, 2023	(x5) 2000, 2006, 2012, 2016, 2022

== Victorian Premier League/NPL Victoria ==
- Highest finish: 6th in 1997
- Season Appearances: 5 Seasons
- Greatest home win: 8–2 against Melton Reds in 1997
- Greatest away win: 6–0 against Westvale in 1999

== Notable current and former international players ==
- Australia Vince Grella
- Australia Rodrigo Vargas
- Australia U20 Ricky Diaco
- Australia U20 Miloš Lujić
- Australia U20 Zlatko Mihajlović
- Australia U20 Bonel Obradović
- Bosnia and Herzegovina Nebojša Pejić
- South Sudan Kenny Athiu
- South Sudan Taban Makoii

== Individual awards ==
Bill Fleming Medal – Media voted VPL Player of the Year

- 1999 – Zlatko Mihajlović

== Club Top Goal Scorers ==
- 2024 - Matheus Assumpção - 14
- 2023 - Nashir Hussainy - 6
- 2022 - Nashir Hussainy - 12
- 2021 - Andy Kecojevic - 5
- 2020 - Cancelled due to COVID-19
- 2019 - Taban Makoii - 7
- 2018 - Damir Stoilovic - 9
- 2017 - Damir Stoilovic - 10
- 2016 - Damir Stoilovic - 16
- 2015 – Hernan de Rito – 6
- 2014 – Vojislav Milojević – 11
- 2013 – Stephane Leblond – 15
- 2012 – Philip Ajao – 5
- 2011 – Goran Zoric – 8
- 2010 – Nenad Pavasovic – 8
- 2009 – Zoran Vukas – 6
- 2008 – Grujo Mrdić – 7
- 2007 – Goran Zorić – 5
- 2006 – Nikolaos Papadopoulos – 11
- 2005 – Sastre Teyedor Juan – 11
- 2004 – Zlatko Mihajlović – 9
- 2003 – Ricky Diaco – 12
- 2002 – Eric Styczen – 9
- 2001 – Nebojsa Kozlica – 6
- 2000 – Eric Styczen – 6
- 1999 – Zlatko Mihajlović – 10
- 1998 – Sasha Nikolić – 4
- 1997 – Danny Gnjidić – 14
- 1996 – Zlatko Mihajlović – 16
- 1995 – Micheal Michalakopoulos – 14
- 1994 – Zlatko Mihajlović – 7
- 1993 – Zlatko Mihaljović – 11
- 1992 – Zlatko Mihaljović – 12
- 1991 – Ian Kerezovic – 9

== Stadium ==
White Eagles play at the Serbian Sports Centre (Srpski Sportski Centar).

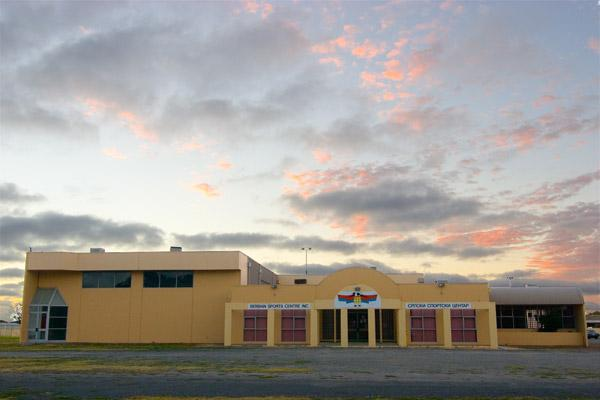

== Current squad ==
Note: Flags indicate national team as defined under FIFA eligibility rules; some limited exceptions apply. Players may hold more than one non-FIFA nationality.

No.	Pos.	Nation	Player
1	GK	AUS	Ali Hakimi
2	DF	AUS	Bol Ter
3	DF	AUS	Matthew Ferreira Hughes
4	DF	ENG	Aaron Morris
5	DF	AUS	Luke Eyles
6	DF	AUS	Thomas Podaridis
7	FW	AUS	Lee Gellis
8	MF	AUS	Liam Wolstenholme
9	FW	ENG	Terence Carter
10	MF	JPN	Miki Gamo
11	MF	AUS	Vasili Tsoumpris
12	MF	AUS	Sam Orritt

No.	Pos.	Nation	Player
13	DF	AUS	Daniel Bennett
15	MF	AUS	Mohammed Khademi
16	MF	AUS	Miles Mavricos
17	MF	AUS	Kyle Marambio
19	MF	AUS	Goran Zoric
21	DF	AUS	Josh Millar
23	DF	AUS	Vojo Milojevic (Captain)
24	FW	AUS	John Kuol
27	FW	AUS	Gianluca Bozzo
29	FW	AUS	Marko Stanisavljevic
55	DF	AUS	Faisal Sakhizada
77	GK	ENG	Thomas Hull

Squad correct at 21 February 2025.

== Competition timeline ==
Season	League										Top scorer		Dockerty Cup
Season	Division	Pld	W	D	L	GF	GA	+/-	Pts	Position	Player(s)	Goals	Dockerty Cup
1982	Div4	26	20	1	5	75	23	52	43	2nd			
1983	Div3	26	23	2	1	95	21	74	48	1st			Runner up
1984	Div4	26	16	5	5	61	34	27	37	2nd			
1985	Div3	26	14	5	7	54	37	17	33	5th			
1986	Div3	26	10	4	12	59	51	8	24	9th			
1987	Div3	24	11	4	9	40	45	−5	26	4th			
1988	Div3	26	14	3	9	62	40	22	31	6th			
1989	Div3	26	6	8	12	31	66	−25	20	11th			
1990	Div3	26	7	4	15	28	58	−30	18	12th			
1991	Div3	26	7	8	11	25	36	−11	31	11th	Ian Kerezovic	9	
1992	Div3	28	19	0	0	67	23	44	47	1st	Zlatko Mihaljović	12	
1993	Div2	26	16	5	5	47	17	30	37	3rd	Zlatko Mihaljović	11	
1994	Div2	26	11	7	8	41	32	9	29	5th	Zlatko Mihaljović	7	
1995	Div2	26	18	5	3	56	29	27	59	1st	Micheal Michalakopoulos	14	
1996	Div1	26	17	4	5	56	27	29	55	1st	Zlatko Mihaljović	16	
1997	VPL	26	11	8	7	43	37	6	41	6th	Danny Gnjidić	14	
1998	VPL	26	8	6	12	27	42	−15	30	11th	Sasha Nikolić	4	
1999	VPL	26	8	6	12	37	40	−3	30	11th	Zlatko Mihaljović	10	
2000	Div1	22	6	4	12	26	36	−10	22	9th	Eric Styczen	6	
2001	Div1	22	8	6	8	27	37	−10	30	8th	Nebojsa Kozlica	6	
2002	Div1	22	5	5	12	34	57	−23	20	11th	Eric Styczen	9	Runner up
2003	SL2SE	22	10	4	8	34	32	2	34	5th	Ricky Diaco	12	
2004	SL2SE	22	4	8	10	25	45	−20	20	10th	Zlatko Mihaljović	9	
2005	SL2	22	14	4	4	50	25	25	46	1st	Sastre Teyedor Juan	11	
2006	SL1	22	11	6	5	30	22	8	39	2nd	Nikolaos Papadopoulos	11	
2007	VPL	26	1	2	23	17	77	−60	5	16th	Goran Zorić	5	No cup
2008	SL1	22	5	6	11	25	38	−13	21	9th	Grujo Mrdić	7	No cup
2009	SL1	22	4	5	13	31	41	−10	17	10th	Zoran Vukas	6	No cup
2010	SL1	22	12	3	7	45	34	11	39	2nd	Nenad Pavasovic	8	No cup
2011	VPL	24	3	6	15	24	62	38	15	11th	Goran Zoric	8	Quarter final
2012	SL1	22	1	5	16	19	69	−49	8	12th	Philip Ajao	5	Zone final
2013	SL2	22	13	5	4	33	24	9	44	1st	Stephane Leblond	14	4th round
2014	NPL 2	26	7	3	16	44	63	19	24	12th	Vojislav Milojević	11	6th round
2015	NPL 2	28	4	5	19	24	54	30	17	9th	Hernan de Rito	6	5th round
2016	NPL 2	28	12	4	12	52	43	+9	40	6th	Damir Stoilovic	16	4th round
2017	NPL 2	28	10	4	14	44	58	14	32	7th	Damir Stoilovic	10	4th round
2018	NPL 2	28	11	6	11	41	47	6	39	4th	Damir Stoilovic	9	4th round
2019	NPL 2	28	4	7	17	26	70	−44	19	10th	Taban Makoii	7	2nd round
2020	NPL 3	0	0	0	0	0	0	0	0	Cancelled due to the COVID-19 Pandemic in Australia			
2021	NPL 3	14	2	3	9	19	37	−18	9	Cancelled	Andrija Kecojevic	5	Cancelled
2022	NPL 3	22	6	1	15	35	60	-25	18	11th	Nashir Hussainy	12	
2023	SL1	22	4	5	13	17	35	-18	17	10th	Nashir Hussainy	6	
2024	SL1	22	15	2	4	53	25	28	48	2nd	Matheus Assumpção	14	

== Managerial history ==
- (Scotland) Gus MacLeod (1987–1996)
- (Serbia) Dušan Kalezić (1997–1998)
- (Scotland) John Gardiner (1998)
- (Serbia) Miloš Nasić (1999)
- (Australia) Bobby McLaughlin (1999)
- (North Macedonia) Zoran Trajčevski (2006–2007)
- (Serbia) Vlado Zorić (2007)
- (Greece) / (Australia) Leon Gardikiotis (2007)
- (Australia) James Sid (2007)
- (England) Stan Webster (2008)
- (Serbia) / (Australia) Zlatko Mihajlović (2008–2011)
- (Serbia) / (Australia) Bojo Jevdjevic (2012)
- (Serbia) / (Australia) Zlatko Mihajlović (2013–2015)
- (North Macedonia) / (Australia) Boyan Mitkov (2015–2016)
- (Serbia) / (Australia) Nik Kovačević (2016)
- (North Macedonia) / (Australia) Vlado Tortevski (2017)
- (Serbia) / (Australia) Nik Kovačević (2018–2019)
- (Serbia) / (Australia) Nebojša Vukosavljević (2019)
- (North Macedonia) / (Australia) John Markovski (2020)
- (Armenia) / (Australia) Artour Kirichian (2021–2022)
- (Serbia) / (Australia) Darko Djurić (2022-2023)
- (Australia) Andrew Skledar (2024-)
