= 2012 Victorian Premier League =

Victorian Premier League
- Season: 2012
- Teams: 12
- Champions: Dandenong Thunder
- Premiers: Dandenong Thunder
- Relegated: Moreland Zebras; Heidelberg United

The 2012 Victorian Premier League was the one-hundredth season of the top tier of club football in Victoria. The home and away season commenced on 23 March 2012. Green Gully were the defending champions. Dandenong Thunder defeated Oakleigh Cannons in the Grand Final, becoming the first side in thirty-one years to secure a Victorian football treble, having won the State Knockout Cup, VPL League Title and their first VPL Grand Final this year.

== Teams ==
Locations of the 2012 Victorian Premier League clubs

Team	Home city	Home ground
Bentleigh Greens	Cheltenham, Melbourne	Kingston Heath Soccer Complex
Dandenong Thunder	Dandenong, Melbourne	George Andrews Reserve
Green Gully	Keilor, Melbourne	Green Gully Reserve
Heidelberg United	Heidelberg, Melbourne	Olympic Park
Hume City	City of Hume, Melbourne	John Ilhan Memorial Reserve
Melbourne Knights	Sunshine, Melbourne	Knights Stadium
Northcote City	Thornbury, Melbourne	John Cain Memorial Park
Oakleigh Cannons	Oakleigh, Melbourne	Jack Edwards Reserve
Richmond SC	Richmond, Melbourne	Kevin Bartlett Reserve
South Melbourne FC	South Melbourne, Melbourne	Lakeside Stadium
Southern Stars FC	Dingley, Melbourne	Kingston Heath Soccer Complex
Moreland Zebras	City of Moreland, Melbourne	Epping Stadium

On 16 December 2011, Whittlesea Zebras announced it would change its name to Moreland Zebras effective this season.

== Promotion and relegation ==
Teams promoted from Victorian State League Division 1:
(After the end of the 2011 season.)

- Whittlesea Zebras (champions)
- Southern Stars FC (runners-up)

Teams relegated to Victorian State League Division 1:
(After the end of the 2011 season.)

- Springvale White Eagles (11th)
- St Albans Saints (12th)

== Regular season ==
The Victorian Premier League 2012 season was played over 22 rounds, beginning on 23 March and concluding on 16 September 2012, followed by the final series.

Pos	Team	Pld	W	D	L	GF	GA	GD	Pts	Qualification or relegation
1	Dandenong Thunder (C)	22	14	6	2	47	14	+33	48	VPL 2012 Victorian Premier League Finals
2	Oakleigh Cannons	22	12	4	6	36	26	+10	40	VPL 2012 Victorian Premier League Finals
3	Green Gully	22	11	4	7	31	25	+6	37	VPL 2012 Victorian Premier League Finals
4	Bentleigh Greens	22	10	5	7	37	27	+10	35	VPL 2012 Victorian Premier League Finals
5	Northcote City	22	9	6	7	28	31	−3	33	VPL 2012 Victorian Premier League Finals
6	South Melbourne	22	9	5	8	34	31	+3	32	
7	Richmond	22	7	9	6	32	29	+3	30	
8	Melbourne Knights	22	9	2	11	25	30	−5	29	
9	Hume City	22	8	4	10	27	27	0	28	
10	Southern Stars FC	22	7	6	9	26	38	−12	27	
11	Moreland Zebras	22	5	3	14	30	42	−12	18	Relegation to Victorian State League Division 1
12	Heidelberg United	22	2	4	16	23	56	−33	10	Relegation to Victorian State League Division 1

Rules for classification: 1) points; 2) goal difference; 3) number of goals scored.
(C) Champions

== Finals ==
Qualifying/Elimination Finals
2	Oakleigh Cannons	2
3	Green Gully Cavaliers	0
4	Bentleigh Greens	0
5	Northcote City	1

Semi Final
1	Dandenong Thunder	1 (4)
Oakleigh Cannons	1 (5)
Green Gully Cavaliers	3
Northcote City	1

Preliminary Final
Dandenong Thunder	4
Green Gully Cavaliers	1

Grand Final
Oakleigh Cannons	1
Dandenong Thunder	2

=== Finals Week 1 ===
21 September 2012 Elimination Final	Bentleigh Greens	0–1	Northcote City	Kingston Heath Soccer Complex, Cheltenham
7:30PM

23 September 2012 Qualifying Final	Oakleigh Cannons	2–0	Green Gully Cavaliers	Kingston Heath Soccer Complex, Cheltenham
5:00PM

=== Finals Week 2 ===
28 September 2012 Major Semi Final	Dandenong Thunder	1–1 (a.e.t.) (4–5 p)	Oakleigh Cannons	George Andrews Reserve, Dandenong
8:15PM

30 September 2012 Minor Semi Final	Green Gully Cavaliers	3–1	Northcote City	Green Gully Reserve, Keilor
3:00PM

=== Finals Week 3 ===
6 October 2012 Preliminary Final	Dandenong Thunder	4–1	Green Gully Cavaliers	Kingston Heath Soccer Complex, Cheltenham
3:00PM

=== Grand Final ===
14 October 2012
5:30 PM

Oakleigh Cannons	1–2	Dandenong Thunder
Diaco 73'	Report	Sherbon 69'; Foster 81'

AAMI Park, Melbourne

== Top goalscorers ==
Pos	Player	Club	Goals
1	Luke Flynn	Dandenong Thunder	17
2	Nathaniel Foster Bowen	Dandenong Thunder	11
3	Nicholas Hegarty	Hume City	11
4	Ricky Diaco	Oakleigh Cannons	10
5	Thomas Cahill	Richmond SC	9

== See also ==
- Victorian Premier League
- Football Federation Victoria
- National Premier Leagues Victoria
