= Hellenic Cup =

- Organiser(s): Hellenic Cup Committee
- Founded: 1983
- Region: Australia
- Website: helleniccup.com.au

The Hellenic Cup (Greek: Ελληνικό Κύπελλο, romanized: Ellinikó Kypello) is an Australian football (soccer) tournament contested by Greek Australian clubs, mostly from Melbourne, Victoria . Starting in 1983, it was an attempt to formalise the previously scattered approach to holding such tournaments in the 1960s and 1970s.

The Hellenic Cup Tournament trophy is housed in the Museum of National Centre for Hellenic Studies & Research at La Trobe University, Bundoora.

== History of tournaments ==
Year	Winner	Runner-Up	Host	Score
1983	Caufield City	Oakleigh Cannons	Port Melbourne Sharks	2-1
1983	Kingston City FC	Northcote City SC	Hermes Mordialloc	2-0
1984	South Melbourne	Yarraville Glory	Northcote City SC	2-0
1985	Northcote City SC	Clifton Hill United	South Melbourne	4-1
1986	Northcote City SC	South Melbourne	Yarraville Glory	3-1
1987	Oakleigh Cannons	Hermes Mordialloc	Oakleigh Cannons	3-1
1988	NOT HELD			
1989		NOT HELD		
1990	Oakleigh Cannons	Caufield City	Western Suburbs SC	4-1
1991	Bentleigh Greens	-	Caufield City	
1992	Altona East Phoenix	Clifton Hill United	Altona East Phoenix	1-1 (3-0 on penalties)
1993	Kingston City FC	Bentleigh Greens	Kingston City FC	3-1
1994	Port Melbourne Sharks	Kingston City FC	Port Melbourne Sharks	3-1
1995	Port Melbourne Sharks	East Richmond Jaguars	Wantirna South SC	2-1
1996	Bentleigh Greens	Western Suburbs SC	Westvale	1-1 (on penalties)
1997	Bentleigh Greens	Wantirna South SC	Bentleigh Greens	1-0
1998		NOT HELD		
1999	Northcote City SC	Bentleigh Greens	East Richmond Jaguars	3-2
2000	Yarraville Glory	South Melbourne	Oakleigh Cannons	2-1* (Extra Time)
2001	Oakleigh Cannons	Westvale	Oakleigh Cannons	1-0
2002	Bentleigh Greens	Northcote City SC	East Richmond Jaguars	2-1
2003	Bentleigh Greens	South Melbourne	Bentleigh Greens	1-0
2004	Altona East Phoenix	Brunswick City	Altona East Phoenix	3-0
2005		NOT HELD		
2006	Oakleigh Cannons	South Melbourne	Western Suburbs SC/Bentleigh Greens/Port Melbourne Sharks (Finals)	2-0
2007	South Melbourne	Oakleigh Cannons	Northcote City SC/South Springvale SC	1-1 (4-2 on penalties)
2008	Heidelberg United	Oakleigh Cannons	Bentleigh Greens/Kingston City FC/Heidelberg United (Finals)	2-0
2009	South Melbourne	Heidelberg United	Bentleigh Greens/Northcote City SC	3-0
2010	Bentleigh Greens	South Melbourne	Kingston City FC/Yarraville Glory	0-0 (5-4 on penalties)
2011	South Melbourne	Heidelberg United	Bentleigh Greens	2-1 (AET)
2012	Western Suburbs SC	Heidelberg United	Western Suburbs SC	3-1
2013	Altona East Phoenix	Oakleigh Cannons	Westvale	3-2

== Winners ==
- 6 Bentleigh Greens (1991, 1996, 1997, 2002, 2003, 2010)
- 4 South Melbourne FC (1984, 2007, 2009, 2011)
- 4 Oakleigh Cannons (1987, 1990, 2001, 2006)
- 3 Northcote City SC (1985, 1986, 1999)
- 3 Altona East Phoenix (1992, 2004, 2013)
- 2 Port Melbourne Sharks (1994, 1995)
- 2 Kingston City FC (1984, 1993)
- 1 Heidelberg United (2008)
- 1 Yarraville Glory (2000)
- 1 Caufield Citys (1983)
- 1 Western Suburbs SC (2012)

== Ladies ==
- Heidelberg United Champions 2006, 2007, 2008, 2009, 2010, 2012
- Southern Suburbs Runners Up 2006
- Bentleigh Greens Runners Up 2007
- South Melbourne FC Runners Up 2008
- Ashburton Runners Up 2010
- Box Hill United Runners Up 2012

== Youth ==
- Brunswick City Champions 2006, Runners Up 2007
- Oakleigh Cannons Champions 2007, 2008
- Heidelberg United Champions 2010, 2011
- South Melbourne FC Runners Up 2010
- Northcote City Runners Up 2006
- Bentleight Greens Runners Up 2011
- Doncaster Rovers Runners Up 2008

== Veterans ==
- 3XY Radio Hellas Champions 2007, Runners Up 2008
- Lalor FC Champions 2011
- Southern Suburbs Champions 2008
- Altona East Phoenix Champions 2012
- Malvern Kinisi Runners Up 2012
- Heidelberg United Alexander Runners Up 2007
- Bayside Argonauts Champions 2009, 2010, Runners Up 2011
- Kingston City FC Runners Up 2010

== Participants ==
- 3XY Radio Hellas (Veterans)
- Altona East Phoenix PAOK
- Ashburton (Women's)
- Bayside Argonauts (Veterans)
- Bentleigh Greens Pagkyprios
- Box Hill United
- Braeside United Lemnos Soccer Club Lemnos
- Brunswick City Leonidas
- Caufield City
- Caufield United Cobras Lemnos
- Clayton FC
- Clifton Hill United FC
- Darebin United Apollo FC
- Doncaster Rovers (Ladies)
- East Richmond Jaguars
- Essendon United Kos
- Hawthorn United
- Harrisfield Hurricanes
- Heidelberg United Megas Alexandros
- Hellenic Moorabbin
- Hobart Olympia Warriors
- Keon Park FC Panathinaikos
- Kingston City FC
- Lalor FC Florina
- Leros United Leros
- Malvern City
- Mill Park FC
- Mordialloc Hermes
- Northcote City SC Iraklis
- Nunawading City (Youth)
- Oakleigh Cannons
- Panathinaikos (Veterans)
- Pansseraikos (Veterans)
- Port Melbourne Nea Ellas
- South Melbourne FC Ellas Melvournis
- South Spirngvale SC Aris
- South Springvale Serres
- Traralgon Olympians SC
- Upfield Atromitos
- Wantirna South
- Waverley Wanderers AEK
- Western Suburbs SC Panellinios
- West Preston SC Antagoras
- Westvale Olympic
- Yiannis Tavern (Veterans)
- Yarraville Glory Doxa
