= Altona East Phoenix SC =

Altona East Phoenix
- Full name: Altona East Phoenix Soccer Club
- Nicknames: Phoenix, PAOK
- Founded: 1979
- Ground: Paisley Park Soccer Complex, Altona North, Victoria
- Capacity: 5,000
- President: Leigh Karafilis
- Head Coach: Paul Donnelly
- League: Victorian State League Division 1 N/W
- 2025: 2nd Victorian State League Division 2 N/W (promoted)
Home colours	Away colours

Altona East Phoenix Soccer Club (PAOK) is an Australian soccer club based in the western suburbs of Melbourne, Victoria, Australia, currently in the Victorian State League Division 1 North-West. They play at the Paisley Park Soccer Complex in Altona North.

== History ==
They were founded in 1979 by local Greek Australians under the name East Altona PAOK Soccer Club, taking their nickname and black and white stripes from the famous Greek club of the same name. The PAOK name was changed to Altona East Phoenix Soccer Club in the 1990s in accordance with the policy of Australian soccer authorities to remove non-Anglo references in club names.

They spent most of their history up until 1992 in the amateur and provisional leagues, before steadily progressing up the league system and forming a close tight-knit squad that provided the results to eventually reach the Victorian Premier League (VPL) in 1999. After a hard-fought first inaugural season Altona East stayed up, which were followed by fantastic seasons in 2000 (3rd), 2001 (Semi-Finals) and 2002 (Elimination Finals). The club's reign as a title contender would end in 2003 as the club saw three different coaches unsuccessfully pull Phoenix out of relegation.

Following the club's first ever relegation, Altona East maintained a solid mid-table finish in the 2004 State League 1 Division. The 2005 season saw a hard-fought campaign to push back into the VPL, finishing third, just outside a promotion place. 2006 saw another woeful season and Phoenix were relegated back into Division 2.

The 2007 season saw a new batch of youngsters as well as some key experienced players, guided under new coach and ex-VPL referee Dominic Barba, as Altona East attempted to begin a new and improved squad. After an opening day 4–0 victory, PAOK saw itself with one victory in its first 9 games. However, the team recruited well mid-season and finished the season off positively, smashing rivals Altona City and Williamstown 6–1 and 7–1 respectively along the way.

The 2008 season saw the club with the determination of promotion back to State League 1, containing a large and very strong squad. Being in the top two positions for most of the season, the Phoenix dropped crucial points and their fate was ultimately realised with a 2–1 away loss to eventual premiers Pascoe Vale, with the club finishing in 4th. However tragedy struck Paisley Park a day after the team's 2–1 home win against Cairnlea, with the news that then-current striker Nazir Ismail had died due to a car accident in the night. Nazir also scored in the match the day before, having a tally of 4 goals in his 7-game stint with the club.

Altona East began the 2009 season with a weaker list than the previous year, but started brightly winning 5 games out of their first 6. However, after a run of mixed results, coach Dominic Barba was dismissed and within the week the experienced Zoran Trajcevski was appointed to salvage the season. The team continued its mixed results, finishing 4th for the second year in succession, despite beating champions North Geelong on the last match day. The following three seasons saw successive 6th-placed finishes, followed by an 8th-placed finish in 2013.

Following the implementation of the National Premier Leagues Victoria, PAOK were "promoted" to State League 1 North-West, essentially the same tier they had competed in the year prior as the Victorian Premier League had been split into two divisions. In 2014, the Phoenix finished in 11th place. The following season was better for the club as they finished in 7th place.

In 2017 Altona East finished in bottom place in the State League 1 North-West competition, enduring relegation to State 2 North-West for 2018, where they would finish in 8th place.

== Colours ==
Altona East adopt the Black and White stripes of Greek side PAOK FC for their home kit and for their crest.

== Honours ==
- Victorian Premier League Finalists 2001, 2002
- Victorian State League Division 1 Champions 1998
- Victorian State League Division 2 Champions 1997
- Victorian State League Division 3 Champions 1994
- Victorian State League Division 4 Champions 1993, Reserve Champions 1993
- Victorian Provisional League Division 1 Champions 1992
- Victorian Provisional League Division 2 Champions 1989
- Hellenic Cup Champions 1992, 2004, 2013
- Cecil Earley Plate Champions 2026

== Individual honours ==
Victorian Premier League Coach of the Year

- 2000 – Peter Ollerton

== Records ==
- Best Result at Home: 14–0 vs Melton Reds at Paisley Park Soccer Complex 10 September 1998
- Best Result Away: 11–0 vs Doveton at Waratah Reserve 16 April 1994
- Worst Result at Home: 0–4 vs Lalor SC on 30 May 1992, 0–4 vs Fawkner Blues on 30 April 2000 and 1–5 vs Williamstown SC on 27 August 2011 at Paisley Park Soccer Complex
- Worst Result Away: 1–10 vs Hoppers Crossing SC at Grange Reserve 27 July 2019
- Longest Winning Streak: 7 games – 18 July 1992 – 12 September 1992
- Longest Losing Streak: 5 games – 5 April 2003 – 18 May 2003
- Longest Unbeaten Streak: 23 games – 2 April 1994 – 17 September 1994

== Top club goal-scorers ==
- 2018 -
- 2017 - A Giannopoulos, E Benjamin, L Francis 2
- 2016 -
- 2015 - Craige Tomkins 4
- 2014 -
- 2013 – PJ Galea 6
- 2012 – PJ Galea 5
- 2011 – Bozidar Lojanica 12
- 2010 – Bozidar Lojanica and Benjamin Stafrace 6
- 2009 – Steven Iosifidis 6
- 2008 – Bozidar Lojanica 13
- 2007 – Marco Tolli 11
- 2006 – Taxiarhis Apostolikas 5
- 2005 – Taxiarhis Apostolikas 13
- 2004 – Danny Gnjidić 13
- 2003 – Nikolaos Papadopoulos and Steve Bartol 4
- 2002 – Daniel Genovesi 7
- 2001 – Nick Papadopoulos 7
- 2000 – Daniel Genovesi 8
- 1999 – George Angelos 11
- 1998 – Peter Kakos 26
- 1997 – George Angelos 14
- 1996 – Arthur Davis 12
- 1995 – Harry Timotheou 12
- 1994 – George Angelos 19
- 1993 – Nick Tsaltas 24

== Current squad ==
- Francesco Favata
- Misko Ceh
- Lucas Tsiflidis
- Benjamin Carrigan
- Nicolas Lopez
- John Limperis
- Hayden Kanjo
- Cameron Gauci
- Cameron Salmon
- Lewis Bamford
- Theo Markelis
- Jake McKettrick
- Atilla Offli
- Scott Fenwick
- Denzel Mifsud
- Daniel Baggio

== Former coaches ==
- 1997–1998: Takis Svigos
- 1999–2000: Peter Ollerton
- 2001–2003: Chris Taylor
- 2003 (Rnd 9): Peter Ollerton
- 2003 (Rnd 18): Giovanni De Amicis
- 2004: Charlie Egan
- 2005–2006: Takis Svigos
- 2006 (Rnd 10): Giovanni De Amicis
- 2007–2009: Dominic Barba
- 2009 (Rnd 15)-2010: Zoran Trajcevski
- 2010 (Rnd 15)-2011: Paul Donnelly

== Rivalries ==
Altona East's rivals Altona Magic, Altona City SC, Yarraville Glory, Williamstown and Preston Lions.

Head-to-Head: Altona Magic

- Games: 10
- Phoenix wins: 5
- Magic wins: 4
- Draws: 1
- Phoenix goals: 11
- Magic goals: 8

Head-to-Head: Preston Lions

- Games: 13
- Phoenix wins: 5
- Preston wins: 8
- Draws: 0
- Phoenix goals: 14
- Preston goals: 18

Head-to-Head: Altona City

- Games: 17
- Phoenix wins: 12
- City wins: 3
- Draws: 2
- Phoenix goals: 37
- City goals: 16

Head-to-Head: Yarraville Glory

- Games: 6
- Phoenix wins: 3
- Glory wins: 2
- Draws: 1
- Phoenix goals: 5
- Glory goals: 3

Head-to-Head: Williamstown SC

- Games: 16
- Phoenix wins: 8
- Willi wins: 4
- Draws: 4
- Phoenix goals: 29
- Willi goals: 17
