= Dandenong Thunder FC =

- Full name: Dandenong Thunder; Football Club
- Nicknames: Thunder, Prishtina
- Founded: 1970; 56 years ago
- Ground: George Andrews Reserve, Dandenong, Victoria
- Capacity: 5,000
- Manager: Adam Piddick
- League: NPL Victoria
- 2025: 3rd of 14
- Website: dandenongthunderfc.com.au
Home colours	Away colours

Dandenong Thunder FC is a soccer club from Dandenong, a suburb in the South-East region of Melbourne, Victoria, Australia. They are an Albanian Australian-backed club. Thunder compete in the National Premier Leagues Victoria.

In 2012, Dandenong claimed the famous treble of the Victorian Premier League Minor Premiership, the Football Federation Victoria State Knockout Cup and the VPL championship.

== History ==
The club was founded by Albanian migrants in 1970 as South Dandenong. Some of the club's founders were Qamil Rexhepi, Ahmet Çoçaj, Shaban Musa, Hamz Veseli and others. The club sometimes had the additional name Prishtina added to support the 1981 student protests campaigning for Kosovan independence in Pristina, Kosovo. Fadil Muriqi, a prominent 1980s soccer midfielder from Kosovo played at the club.

Club membership is mainly composed of Albanians with origins from Kišava (Albanian: Këshavë), a village in south-western North Macedonia. The grounds of Dandenong Thunder host the Qamil Rexhepi Cup, named after one of the club's founders Qamil Rexhepi and is played annually in January between local Albanian Melbourne based soccer clubs. Club grounds are also used by Albanians for community events and other functions, often organised by the local Albanian-Australian Community Association. The club logo is the Albanian double-headed eagle from the Albanian flag. Dandenong Thunder is primarily backed and supported by Albanian Australians living in Melbourne.

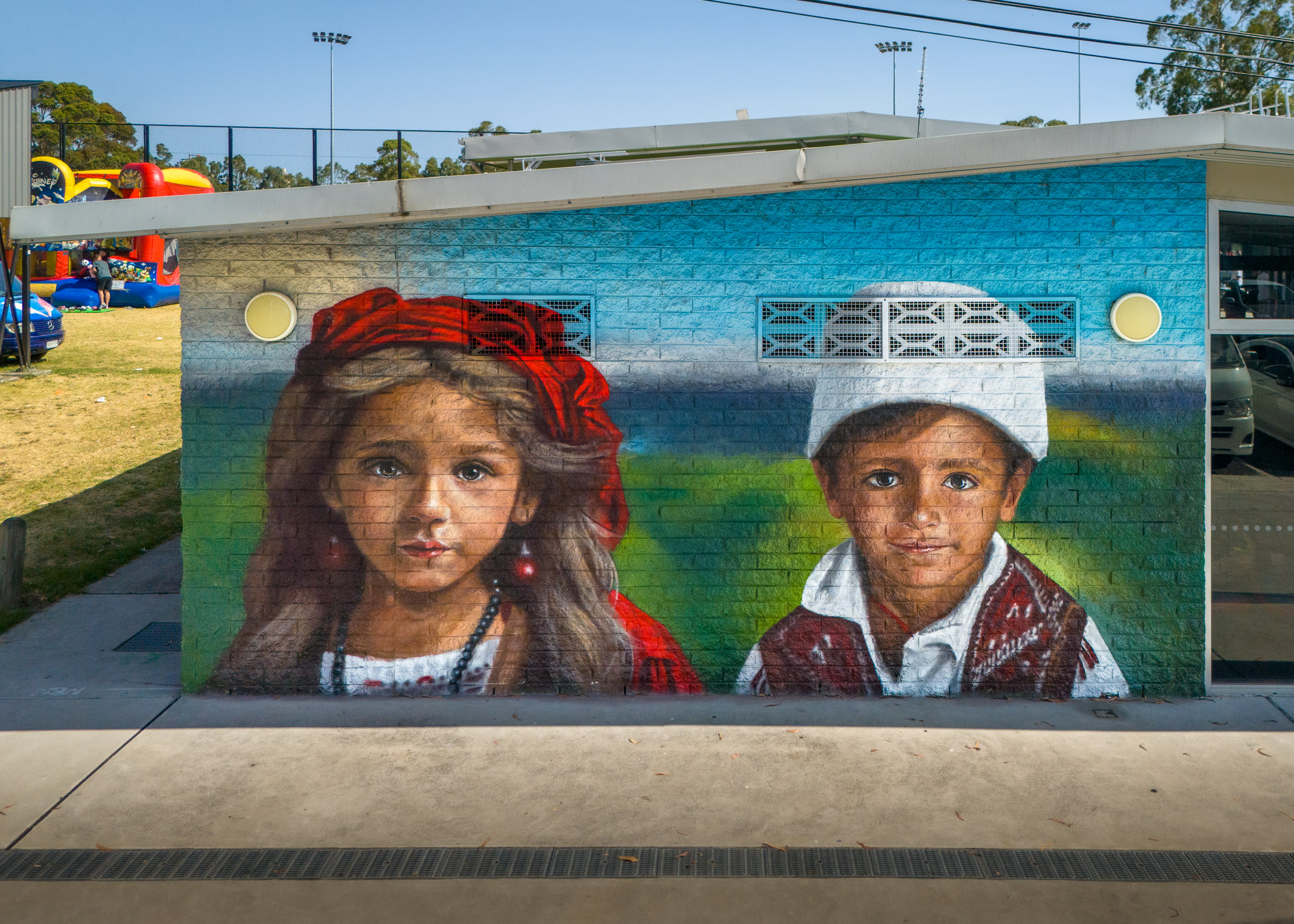
Artwork depicting two Albanian youths in traditional dress on the side of a building at George Andrews Reserve, Dandenong, Australia. (2025)

=== Early years ===
South Dandenong started competing in the Victorian District League East Division, which was the 6th tier of football (soccer) in Victorian Football Pyramid. They played in the Provisional leagues until merging with Richmond United, and played under that name for the 1987 season in the 8th tier Provisional League Division 3. The following season, they were renamed back to South Dandenong and started the rise through the divisions. By 1992 they had reached State League Division 3, and from 1994 they continued their rise managing to get promotion to a higher level each year until they reached the Victorian Premier League, the highest level in Victoria, in 1998.

=== 2000–2013 ===
South Dandenong returned to the Victorian Premier League in 2001 but were relegated again as the season ended.

At the end of the 2000 season, South Dandenong underwent a name change, becoming Dandenong Thunder for the 2001 season. They spent the next seven seasons in the Victorian State League Division 1. The Club began spending more on players in 2007, bringing in Veton Korcari from Richmond SC and Louis Brain, a former A-League player for Adelaide United and were promoted from State League 1 in 2008.

Thunder surprised everyone in their return to the top flight, clinching the 2009 Victorian Premier League Minor Premiership with a lead of 12 points. Thunder managed to go undefeated for the first 15 rounds of the season, taking their running total to 31 games undefeated, stretching back to Round 5 of the 2008 season. Individual player achievements included youngster Jack Hingert being selected to play for A-League side North Queensland Fury and Joey Di Iorio winning the golden boot. Despite their season long domination, Thunder eventually lost the Grand Final to Altona Magic SC on penalties.

In the 2012 season, Thunder managed a famous treble, the first in their history. They won the Victorian State Knockout Cup, beating Port Melbourne Sharks in the Grand Final on penalties, the Minor Premiership and the Championship, beating Oakleigh Cannons 2–1 in the Grand Final at AAMI Park. This was their first ever VPL Championship.

=== National Premier Leagues Victoria ===
In late 2013, the club had their bid for a place in the National Premier Leagues Victoria accepted and competed in the top tier of the NPL Victoria in 2014. Thunder placed 9th in the 14 team league in 2014. Young winger Matthew Millar was the club's top goalscorer with seven goals, also winning the NPL Rising Star award.

In 2015, Thunder slashed its budget in an attempt to reduce club debt, and replaced many higher earners with young and inexperienced but talented players. Then manager Dean Hennessey also departed, joining Hume City, and the club brought in Stuart Munro as the new head coach. The season didn't go to plan, though, with the team struggling to put together good performances. Relegation was confirmed in Round 25, when the side lost 3–0 to North Geelong Warriors.

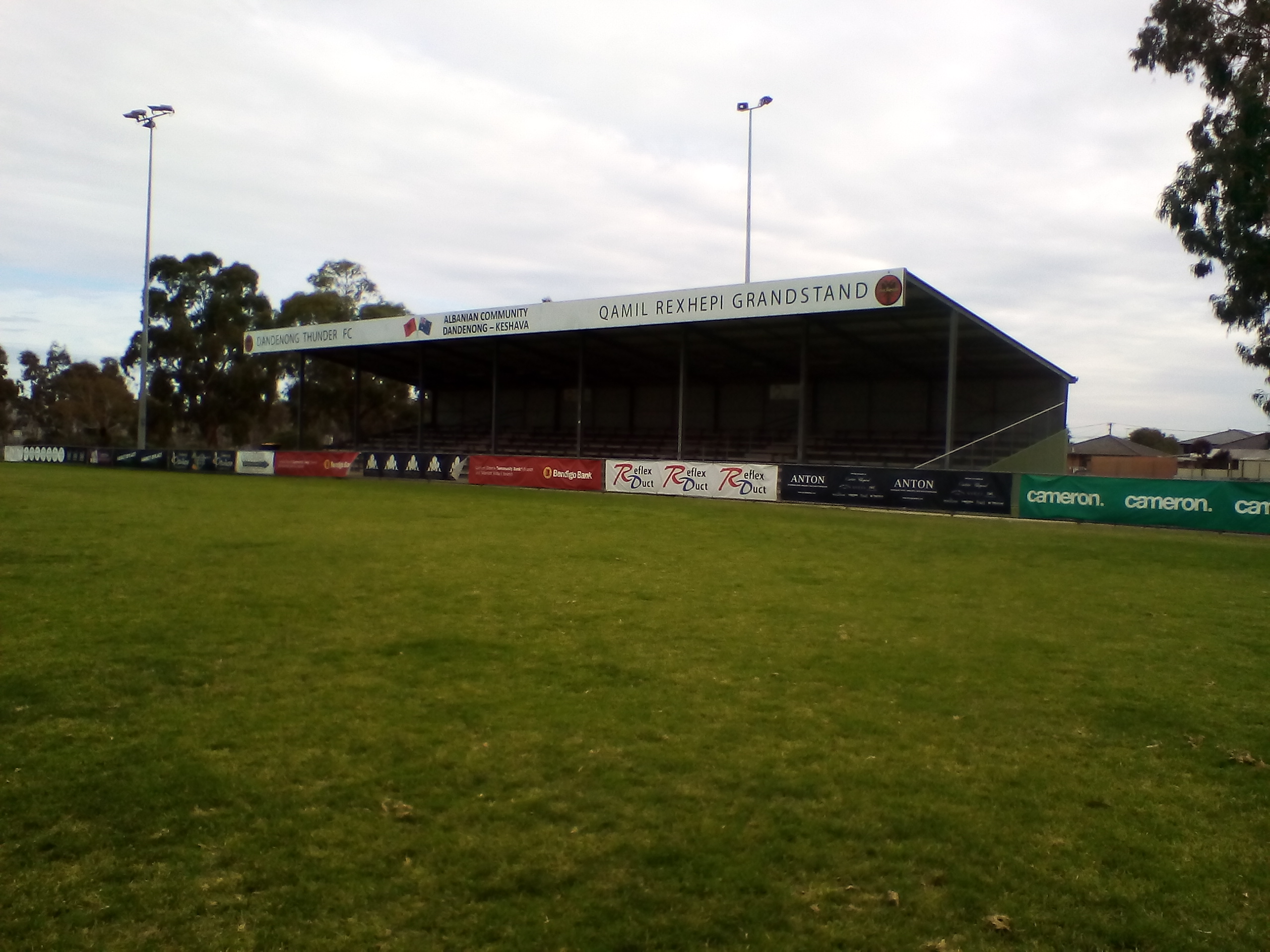
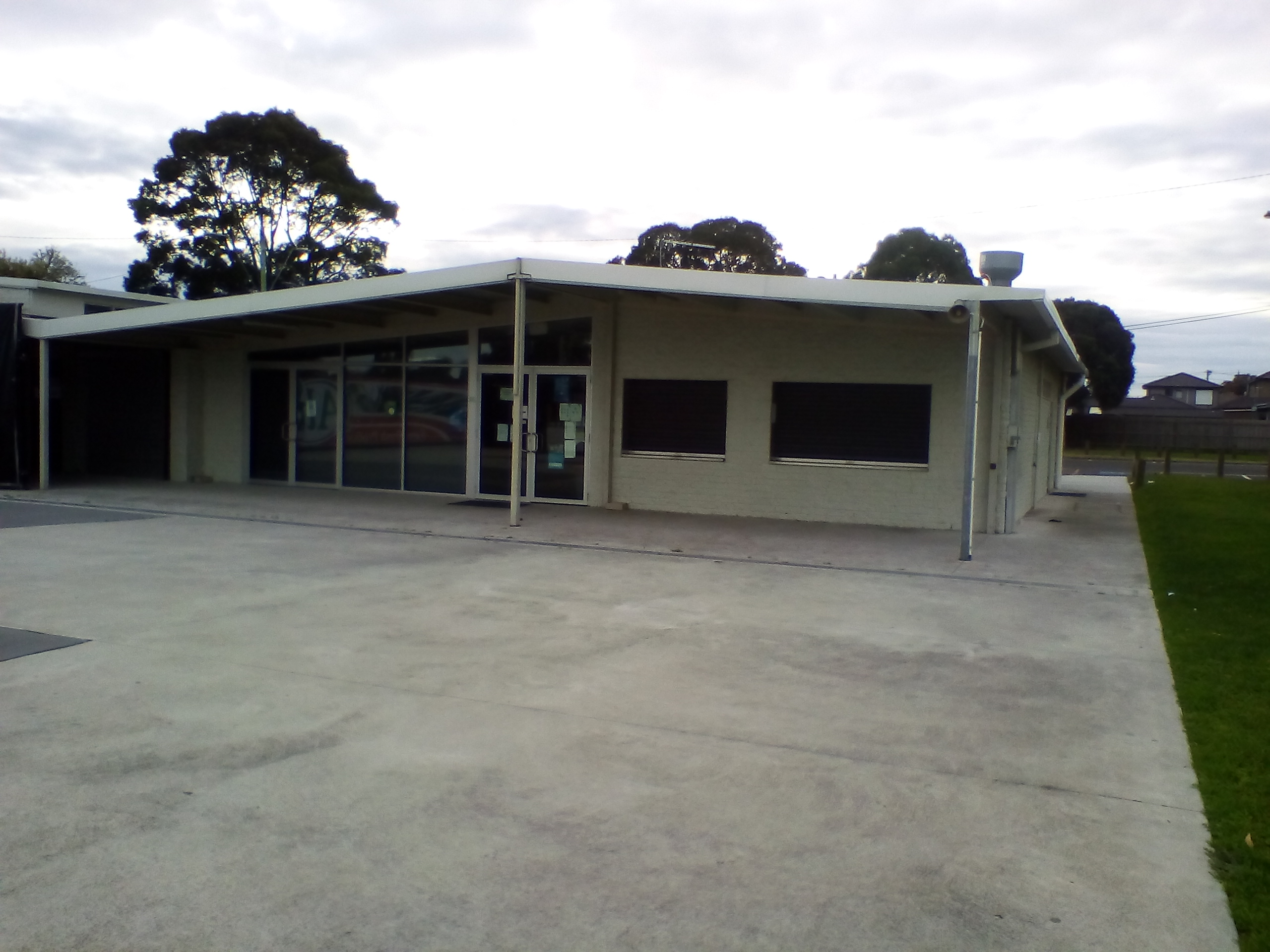
Dandenong Thunder soccer ground (left) and its clubhouse and ground (right)

In the off-season, Thunder named Huss Skenderovic as the coach for the 2016 NPL1 season, and announced the signings of former Melbourne Victory FC player Kristian Sarkies, former Socceroo Simon Colosimo and English striker Brandon Barnes. Dandenong Thunder opened its NPL2 East campaign with 15 consecutive wins, before a 3–3 draw against NPL2 West leaders Whittlesea Ranges. On 14 April, Dandenong were deducted three league points after being found guilty by the Football Federation Victoria tribunal of fielding ineligible player Amir Osmančević in Round 1, where he should have sat out through a suspension accumulated the previous season while at his previous club. Thunder's first loss of the season came in Round 21, when it unexpectedly went down to Box Hill United 2-1. Thunder lost three more games in the final seven games of the season, leading to Kingston City winning the league title on the final match day of the season. Dandy's second place finish meant it went to the NPL2 promotion playoff, facing North Geelong Warriors, whom they had beaten 2–0 at Elcho Park earlier in the season. Despite going into the clash as favourites, Thunder went down 4–1, North Geelong condemning the side to NPL2 soccer for the second season running. At the end of season awards night, Thunder marksman Barnes took out both the league Top Goalscorer, with an NPL2 record 41 goals, and league Best and Fairest awards.

Dandenong Thunder lost senior head manager Huss Skenderović as he joined Adelaide United FC to become the A-League side's head W-League and National Youth League coach. Thunder began its preparations for 2017 by appointing Italian Giuseppe Anastasi as its new head coach for the 2017 NPL2 East season. Thunder had to change coaches just a few weeks later, as Anastasi was unable to travel to Australia due to family reasons. Dandenong reacted by appointing Gianfranco Impellizzeri to the helm. The race to promotion from NPL2 East was contested for most of the season between Thunder and neighbours Dandenong City SC. Led by Barnes, who scored 35 goals in 28 games, winning the league golden boot again, Thunder achieved promotion by taking out the NPL2 East title.

Despite promotion, Thunder and Impellizzeri parted ways in the off-season and the club appointed Andy Vargas as the new head manager. Thunder started the 2018 NPL season with four consecutive losses, including an embarrassing 9-0 loss to South Melbourne at home. Thunder won six of its next nine games and pulled itself well clear of the relegation zone. On 7 June 2018, Veton Korcari ceased playing with Thunder to take up the recently vacated coaching role. Korcari had been a long-serving and well regarded player at Thunder. Thunder finished the season in 8th place with Barnes taking out the league golden boot for the third season running, scoring 22 goals.

In 2019, Thunder avoided automatic relegation on the final day of the home-and-away season with a 4-1 win over Melbourne Knights FC. The result sent Thunder to the promotion-relegation playoff, where they defeated FC Bulleen Lions at Melbourne Rectangular Stadium 1-0 through a Barnes goal. Barnes finished 3rd in the league Golden Boot race, scoring 19 goals. After the season, it was announced that Barnes would be leaving the club after scoring 119 goals in 116 games. A week later, it was announced that head coach Korcari would also be leaving the club by mutual consent.

== Current squad ==
As of 1 July, 2026

Note: Flags indicate national team as defined under FIFA eligibility rules; some limited exceptions apply. Players may hold more than one non-FIFA nationality.

No.	Pos.	Nation	Player
1	GK	AUS	Andrew Withers
2	DF	AUS	Tobenna Obani
3	DF	AUS	Daniel Alessi
4	DF	AUS	Sevdin Ismaili
5	DF	AUS	Mersim Memeti
6	MF	AUS	Jack Morton
7	MF	AUS	Jordan Courtney-Perkins
8	MF	AUS	George Mells
9	FW	SRI	Wade Dekker
10	FW	ENG	Joe Nyahwema
11	FW	AUS	Ali Sulemani
13	MF	AUS	Allan Korcari

No.	Pos.	Nation	Player
14	FW	AUS	Hassan Jalloh
15	DF	AUS	Parker Williams
16	MF	ENG	Harry Phillips
18	MF	AUS	Dante Avain
19	MF	AUS	Arian Korcari
20	DF	AUS	Oliver Jankulovski
21	DF	AUS	Kaelan Majekodunmi (on loan from Perth Glory)
22	MF	KOR	Lee Woo-hyeok
23	FW	AUS	Laat Mathiang
24	DF	AUS	Ben Djiba
32	GK	AUS	Benjamin Mccauley
79	GK	AUS	Dennys Martin

== Previous players ==
See: Dandenong Thunder FC players

== Honours ==
- 2017– NPL Victoria 2 Champions
- 2012– Victorian Premier League Champions
- 2012– Victorian Premier League Minor Premiers
- 2012– Dockerty Cup Winners (FFV State Knockout Cup)
- 2009– Victorian Premier League Minor Premiers
- 2008– Victorian State League Division 1 Runners-Up
- 2000– Victorian State League Division 1 Champion
- 1997– Victorian State League Division 1 Champion
- 1996– Victorian State League Division 2 Runners-Up
- 1995– Victorian State League Division 3 Runners-Up
- 1991– Victorian State League Division 4 Runners-Up
- 1990– Victorian Provisional League 1 Champion
- 1989– Victorian Provisional League 2 Runners-Up
- 1988– Victorian Provisional League 3 Champion

== Individual honours ==
- 2016– NPL2 Best and Fairest: Brandon Barnes
- 2016– NPL2 Players' Player of the Year: Brandon Barnes
- 2016– NPL2 Golden Boot: Brandon Barnes
- 2016– NPL2 Goalkeeper of the Year: Fraser Maclaren
- 2014– NPL Rising Star Winner: Matthew Millar
- 2012– Jimmy Rooney Medalist: Nate Foster
- 2012– Jimmy McKay Medalist: Shane Rexhepi
- 2012– Victorian Premier League Goalkeeper of the Year: Stuart Webster
- 2012– Victorian Premier League Coach of the Year: Chris Taylor
- 2012– Victorian Premier League Leading Goal Scorer: Luke Sherbon
- 2012– Bill Fleming Media Award Player of the Year: Luke Sherbon
- 2009– Victorian Premier League Coach of the Year: Stuart Munro
- 2009– Victorian Premier League Leading Goal Scorer: Joe Di Iorio

== Top goal-scorers ==
- 2017– Brandon Barnes 35 goals (Awarded League Golden Boot)
- 2016– Brandon Barnes 41 goals (Awarded League Golden Boot)
- 2015– Yusuf Ahmed 11 goals
- 2014– Matthew Millar 7 goals
- 2013– Unknown
- 2012– Luke Sherbon 21 goals (Awarded League Golden Boot)
- 2011– Luke Sherbon 14 goals
- 2010– Jamie Reed 6 Goals
- 2009– Joe Di Iorio 18 Goals (Awarded League Golden Boot)
- 2008– Ryan Davidson 11 Goals
- 2007– Veton Korcari 10 Goals (Runner up in the league)
- 2006– Ryan Davidson 9 Goals
- 2005– Leon Buhic 9 Goals
- 2004– Veton Korcari 9 Goals
- 2003– Miles Tidd, Joey Di Iorio 11 Goals
- 2002– Alfonso Opazo 10 Goals
- 2001– Boris Ovcin 4 Goals
- 2000– Victor Korkaric 17 Goals
- 1999– Nick Van Egmond, Billy Wright 7 Goals
- 1998– Pino Corallo, Reshat Mezensof 11 Goals
- 1997– Billy Wright 28 Goals (Top scorer in the league)
- 1996– Billy Wright 30 Goals (Top scorer in the league)
- 1995– Billy Wright 27 Goals (Joint Top scorer in the league)
- 1994– Billy Wright 22 Goals (Top scorer in the league)

== Club Champion Award ==
- 2012 – Luke Sherbon
- 2011 – Shane Rexhepi
- 2010 – Levent Osman
- 2009 – Levent Osman
- 2008 – Levent Osman
