= 2019 Dockerty Cup =

2019 FFV Dockerty Cup
Tournament details
- Country: Australia
- Teams: 214

Final positions
- Champions: Hume City

The 2019 Dockerty Cup was a football (soccer) knockout-cup competition held between men's clubs in Victoria, Australia in 2019, the annual edition of the Dockerty Cup. Victorian soccer clubs from the National Premier Leagues Victoria divisions, State League divisions, regional, metros and masters leagues competed for the Dockerty Cup trophy.

The competition also served as Qualifying Rounds for the 2019 FFA Cup. In addition to the two Victorian A-League clubs, the four Preliminary Round 7 winners qualified for the final rounds of the 2019 FFA Cup, entering at the Round of 32.

The cup was won by Hume City, their first title.

== Format ==
Round	Clubs remaining	Winners from previous round	New entries this round	Main Match Dates
First Qualifying Round	214	none	15	9–10 Feb
Second Qualifying Round	208	9	47	16–17 Feb
Round 1	180	28	60	23–25 Feb
Round 2	136	40	36	28 Feb–4 Mar
Round 3	100	40	24	7–11 Mar
Round 4	64	32	32	17–20 Apr
Round 5	32	32	none	30 Apr–8 May
Round 6	16	16	none	22–29 May
Round 7	8	8	none	11–12 Jun
Semi-Finals	4	4	none	9–10 Jul
Final	2	2	none	10 Aug

== Prize fund ==
The prize fund is detailed below.

Round	No. of Clubs receive fund	Prize fund
Semi-finalists	2	$2,500
Runner-up	1	$5,000
Champion	1	$10,000
Total		$20,000

== Preliminary rounds ==
Victorian clubs participated in the 2019 FFA Cup via the preliminary rounds. This was open to teams from the NPL, NPL2, 5 State League divisions, regional and metros leagues. Teams were seeded in terms of which round they would enter based on their division in 2019.

The four qualifiers for the final rounds were:

FFA Cup Qualifiers
Hume City (2)	Melbourne Knights (2)	Bulleen Lions (3)	Moreland Zebras (3)

== Semi finals ==
A total of four teams took part in this stage of the competition, with the matches played in July 2019. As a new rule for the semi-finals and final, a fourth substitution was allowed if the game went to extra time.

Tie no	Home team (tier)	Score	Away team (tier)
1	Melbourne Knights (2)	2–1	Bulleen Lions (3)
2	Moreland Zebras (3)	0–1	Hume City (2)

== Final ==
10 August 2019	Melbourne Knights	0–1	Hume City	Kingston Heath Soccer Complex
1700		Report	Brown 28'
