= Carl Recchia =

Australian soccer player

Personal information
- Full name: Carl Recchia
- Date of birth: 13 December 1984 (age 41)
- Place of birth: Melbourne, Australia
- Height: 1.80 m (5 ft 11 in)
- Positions: Centre midfielder; centre back

Senior career*
Years	Team	Apps	(Gls)
2003–2004	South Melbourne	9	(0)
2005–2006	Melbourne Victory	12	(0)
2006	Fawkner Blues	15	(6)
2006–2007	Queensland Roar	1	(0)
2007	Fawkner Blues	25	(1)
2008–2009	Altona Magic	53	(10)
2010–2011	South Melbourne	35	(4)
2011–2012	Moreland Zebras	21	(8)
2012–2013	South Melbourne		
2014–2017	Pascoe Vale	35	(0)
- * Club domestic league appearances and goals as of 30 September 2016

Carl Recchia (born 13 December 1984) is an Australian footballer.

== Biography ==
Recchia played as a central midfielder for the Melbourne Victory in the inaugural season of the Hyundai A-League. He was let go at the end of the season, and returned to the Victorian Premier League with Fawkner Blues. On 20 October 2006 it was announced that he was to join Queensland Roar FC on a short-term contract. Recchia returned again to the Victorian Premier League to captain Altona Magic to their Back-to-Back championship win in 2009 before returning to his first club South Melbourne FC to play for them in the 2010 and 2011 VPL seasons.
