= Paisley Park Soccer Complex =

Soccer venue in Altona North, Victoria

Paisley Park
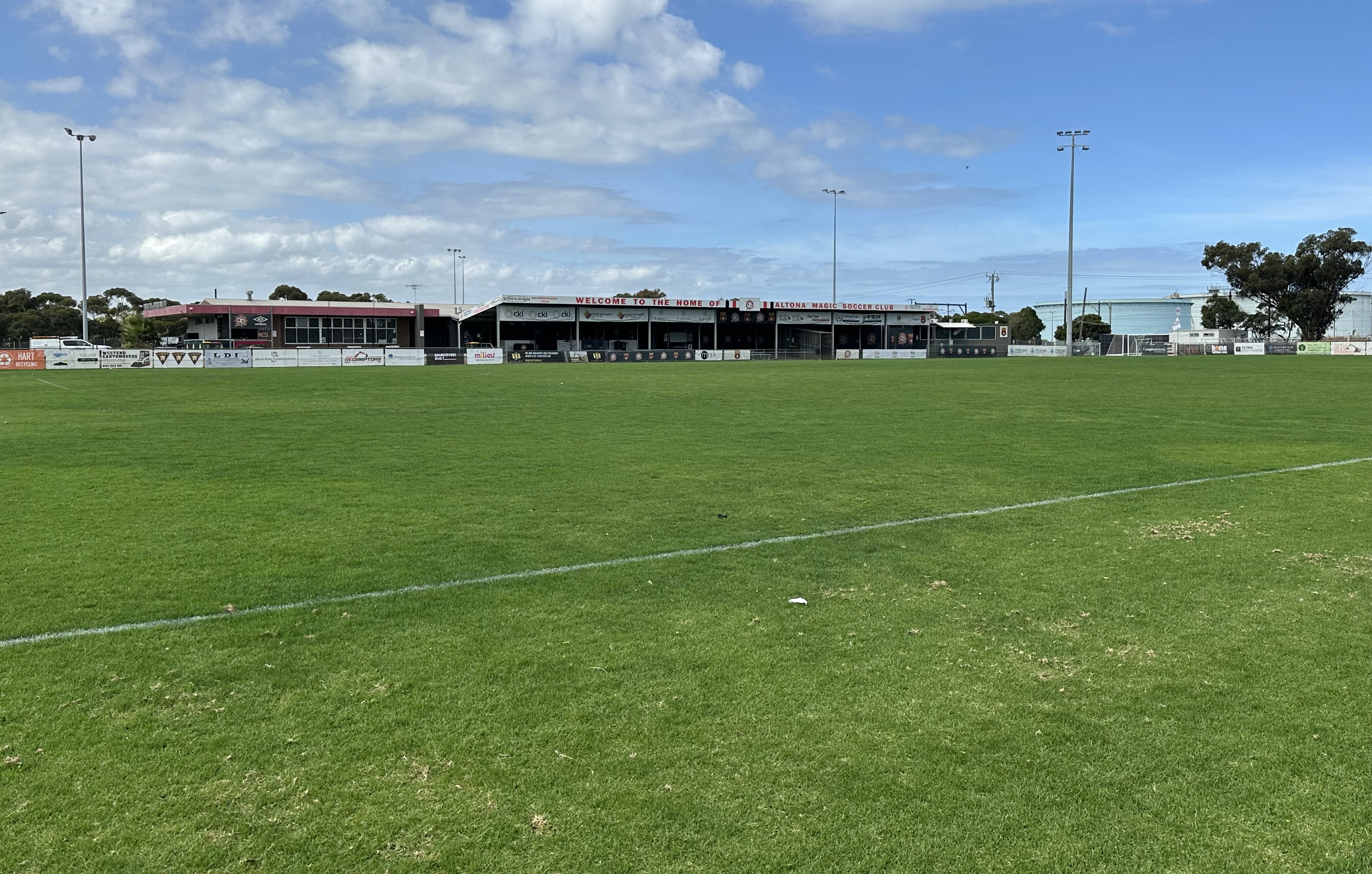
- Pitch 1 at Paisley Park in April 2026
- Interactive map of Paisley Park
- Location: Altona North, Victoria
- Coordinates: 37°50′48″S 144°51′25″E
- Owner: City of Hobsons Bay
- Capacity: 5,000

Construction
- Opened: 1975; 51 years ago

Tenants
- Altona Magic; Altona East Phoenix

The Paisley Park Soccer Complex in Altona North, Victoria, provides the facilities for local soccer club Altona Magic, who play in National Premier Leagues Victoria and are supported by the Macedonian Australian community. The stadium has a capacity of 5,000 spectators. The Altona East Phoenix, who currently participate in the Victorian State League Division 1 N/W, also share the facilities, and are predominantly backed by the local Greek Australian community.

The complex was established in 1975 and upgraded in 2005. This gave Altona Magic new clubrooms, and allowed space for the Altona East Phoenix move in. Their facilities are side-by-side, separated by a folding wall, allowing the space to be expanded, which can cater for 200 people.
