= Altona North =

- Suburb
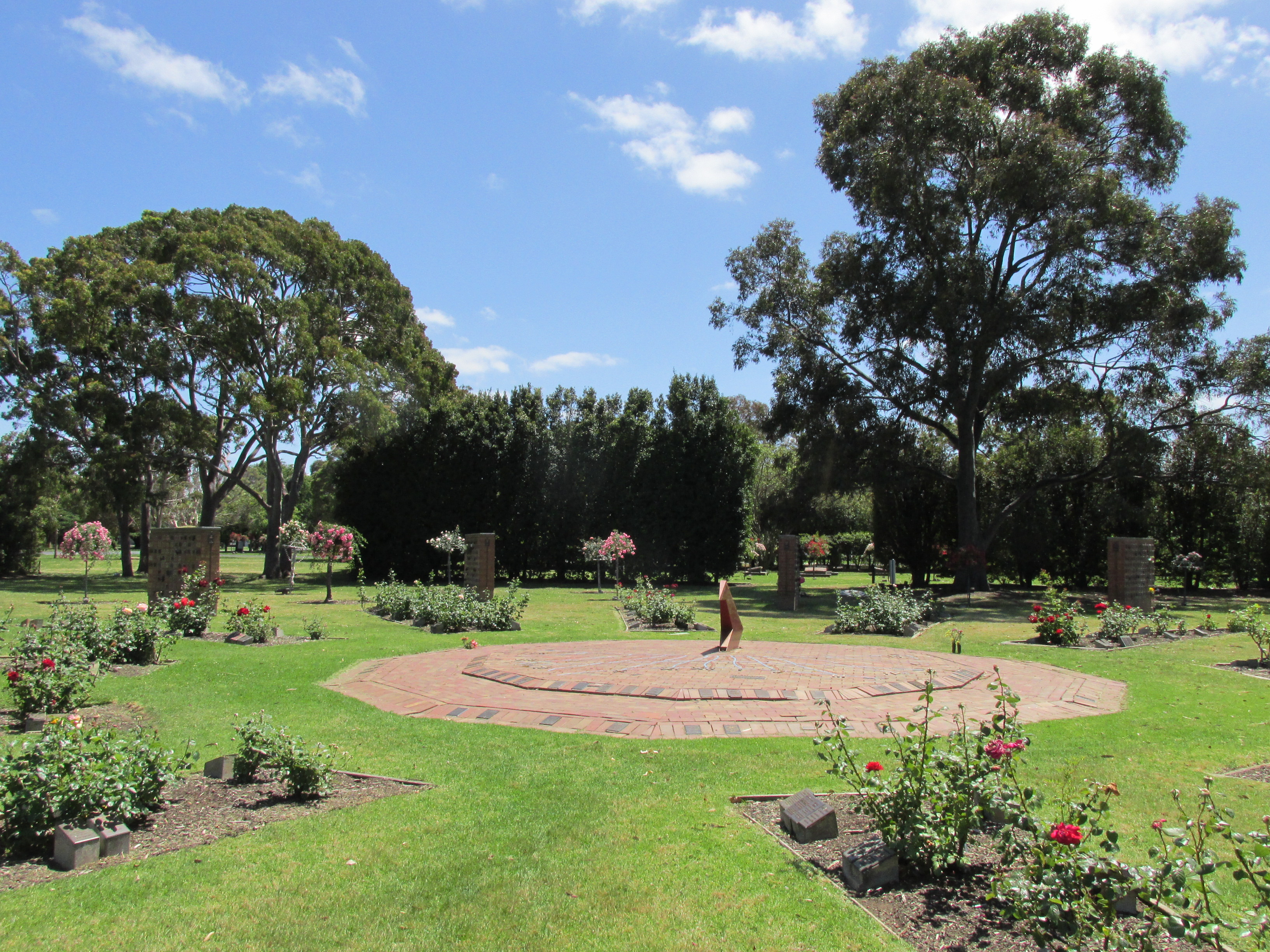
- The Sundial at the Altona Memorial Park, Victoria

- Interactive map of Altona North
- Coordinates: 37.841°S 144.849°E
- Country: Australia
- State: Victoria
- City: Melbourne
- LGA: City of Hobsons Bay
- Location: 10 km (6.2 mi) from Melbourne

Government
  - State electorate: Williamstown
  - Federal division: Gellibrand

Area
  - Total: 14.1 km^{2} (5.4 sq mi)
- Elevation: 18 m (59 ft)

Population
  - Total: 12,962 (2021 census)
  - Density: 919/km^{2} (2,381/sq mi)
- Postcode: 3025
Suburbs around Altona North
Laverton North	Brooklyn	Yarraville
Laverton North	Altona North	Newport
Laverton	Altona	Williamstown North

Altona North is a suburb in Melbourne, Victoria, Australia, 10 km (6.2 mi) south-west of Melbourne's Central Business District, located within the City of Hobsons Bay local government area. Altona North recorded a population of 12,962 at the 2021 census.

Bordering suburbs include Altona, Brooklyn, Laverton North, Newport, South Kingsville, Williamstown North and Yarraville. In addition to the Paisley Park sporting complex, Altona North is home to three parks; S J Clement Reserve – Gilligan Rd, W L J Crofts Reserve – Blackshaws Rd and Urban Forest Reserve – Grieve Pde.

== History ==
The Altona area was home to Kurung-Jang-Balluk Aboriginal people, of the Woiwurrung clan.

Altona North Post Office first opened on 11 April 1960 as suburban development took place. In 1966 it was renamed Beevers when a new Altona North office opened in Duke Street to the south. In 1986 Altona Gate Office replaced Beevers.

The Prince and Princess of Wales officially opened the Mason Street Housing Commission Estate in their 1983 royal visit.

== Demographics ==
In the 2021 census, there were 12,962 people in Altona North. 59.1% of people were born in Australia. The next most common countries of birth were Lebanon 3.8%, Italy 3.6%, Vietnam 3.4%, Greece 2.9% and England 1.8%. 51.5% of people only spoke English at home. Other languages spoken at home included Arabic 11.2%, Greek 5.1%, Italian 4.5%, Vietnamese 4.2% and Cantonese 1.6%. The most common responses for religion were No Religion 27.2%, Catholic 26.1% and Islam 15.9%.

== Transport ==
- Route 232: Altona North to City (Queen Victoria Market)
- Route 411: Laverton station to Footscray (via Altona Meadows and Altona)
- Route 412: Laverton station to Footscray (via Altona Meadows and Altona)
- Route 414: Laverton station to Footscray
- Route 432: Newport to Yarraville (via Altona Gate Shopping Centre)
- Route 471: Williamstown to Sunshine station (via Newport and Altona Gate Shopping Centre)
- Route 903: Altona to Mordialloc (SmartBus Service)
- Route 944: City to Point Cook (Night Bus Service)

== Industry ==
The entire western part of the suburb comprises the Altona North Industrial Precinct, which is home to significant industrial activity, including construction, logistics, manufacturing and heavy industry. ExxonMobil's Altona Refinery, one of two oil refineries in Victoria, is located in the suburb's south-east. Altona North was home to the Don Smallgoods factory from 1970 to 2011 when it closed and amalgamated into the KR Castlemaine factory in Castlemaine. This closure, performed by George Weston Foods, which owned both companies, resulted in the loss of hundreds of jobs. In 2018 it was announced that this site would be redeveloped into a residential area.

The Toyota Australia Altona Plant is located in Altona North. Opened in 1978, Toyota vehicles were built there from 1994 until 2017 when Toyota ceased car production in Australia. As of 2023, the site was home to Victoria's only commercial hydrogen fuel station for the Toyota Mirai, and hydrogen fuel cell generators were being manufactured there. Since 2018, parts of Altona North have been undergoing redevelopment from industrial zones to residential zones.

== Attractions ==
- Altona Gate Shopping Centre
- Kororoit Creek Trail
- Kororoit Creek
- In 2012, British festival promoters All Tomorrow's Parties held a festival called I'll Be Your Mirror across two stages at The Westgate Entertainment Centre and Grand Star Receptions in Altona North. Headline acts included My Bloody Valentine, The Drones and Beasts of Bourbon.

== Sport ==
Altona Lakes Golf Club at Paisley Park, Mason Street, is a 9-hole golf course and Driving Range. Also located within the Paisley Park sporting complex is Altona Badminton Centre, which opened in 1985. The badminton centre contains 12 courts and is open seven days a week. The Paisley Park sporting facility also includes a gymnasium, swimming pool, premier league soccer facility, bowling club, miniature railway and lacrosse fields.

Altona Magic, the local football (soccer) team plays in the Victorian Premier League and Altona East Phoenix play in the Victorian State League 2 N/W.

== Gallery ==
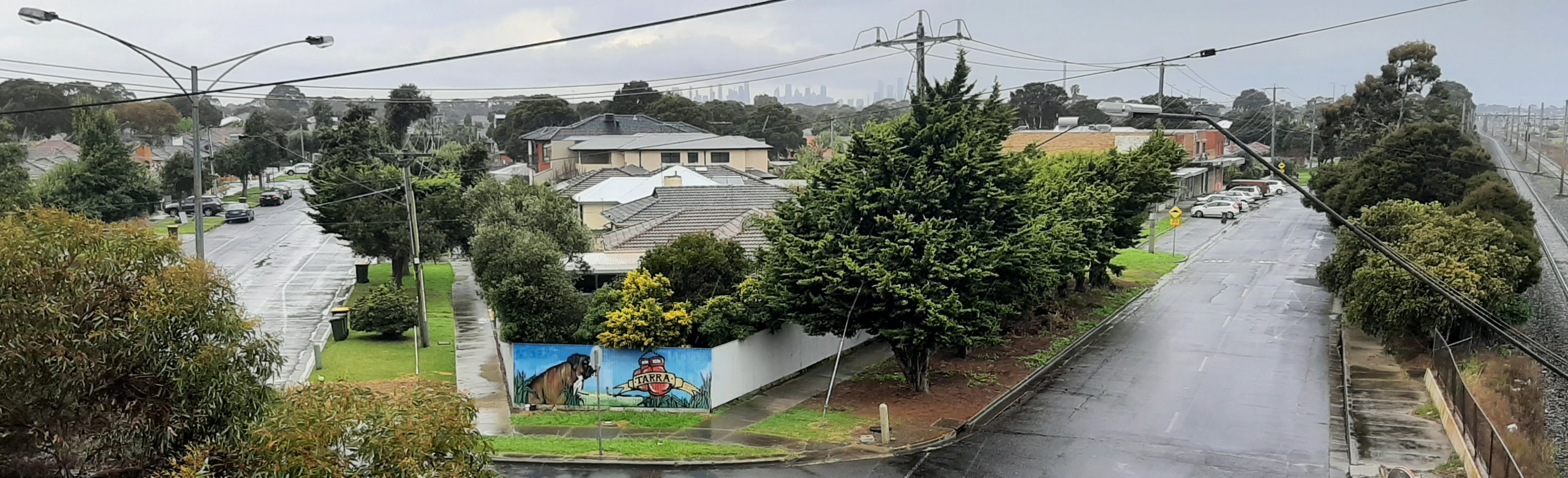
View of houses from overpass

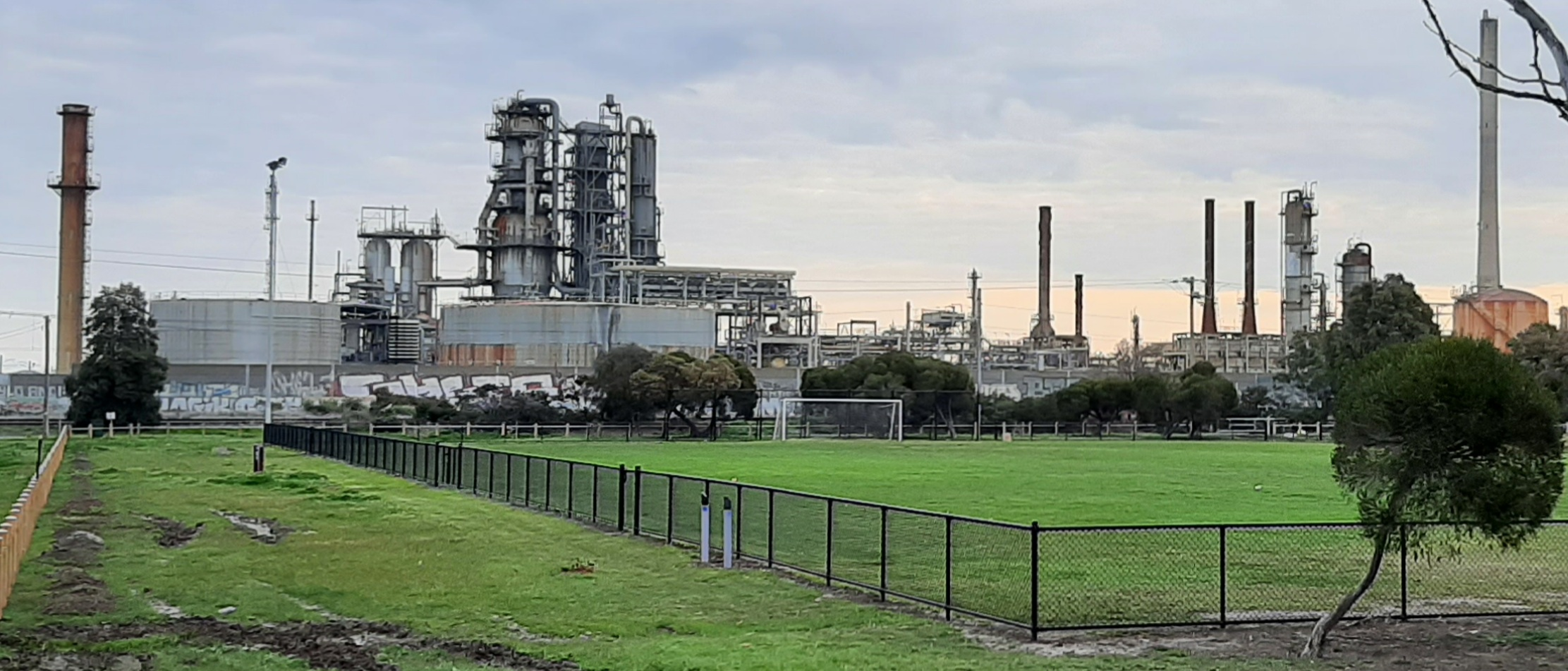
The Altona Oil Refinery

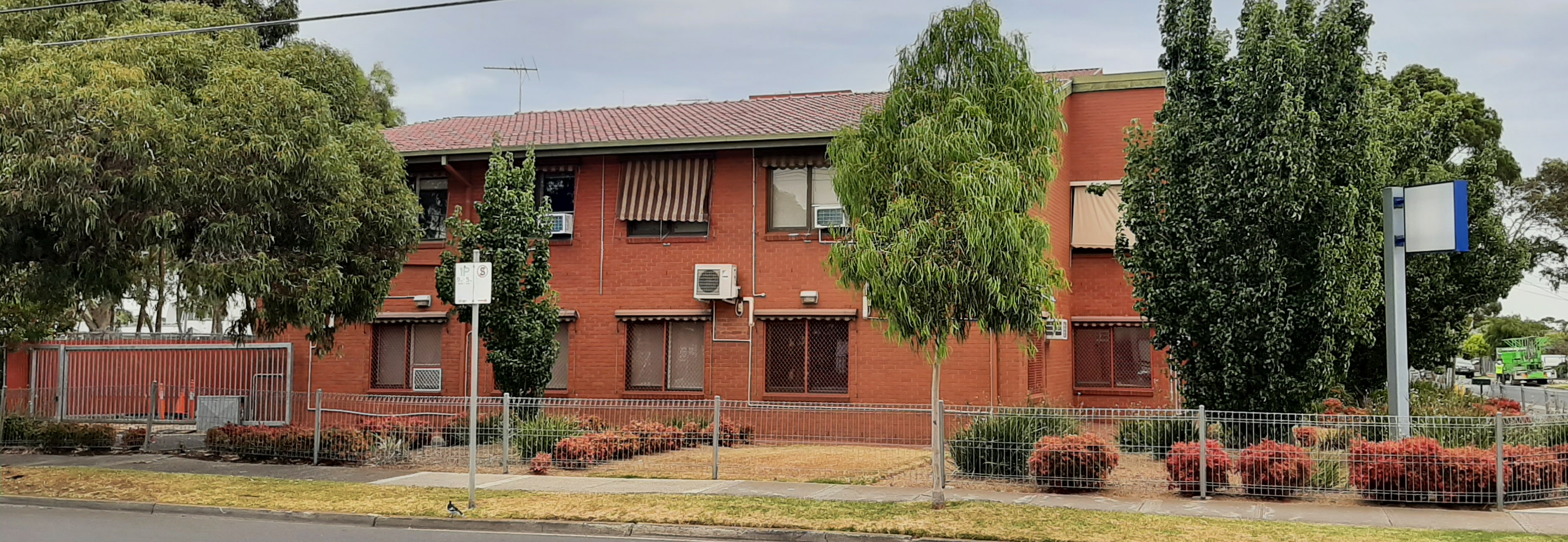
The former Altona North police station

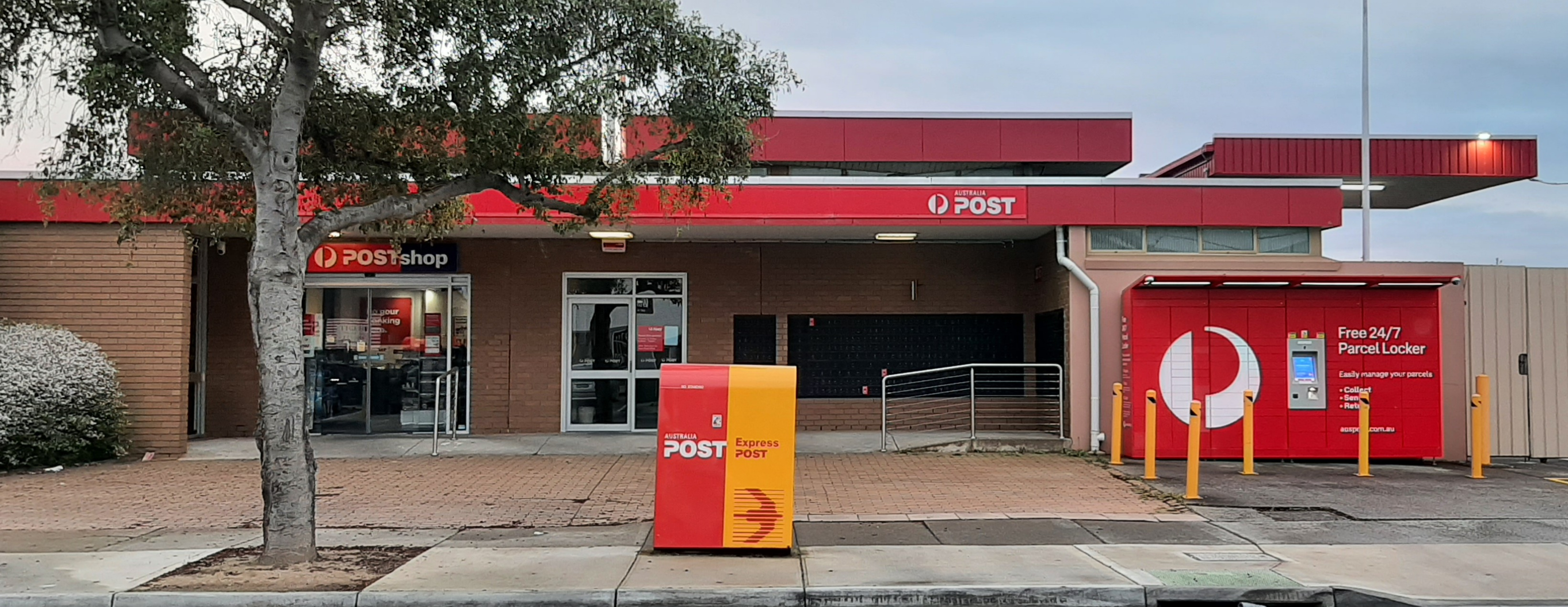
Altona North LPO

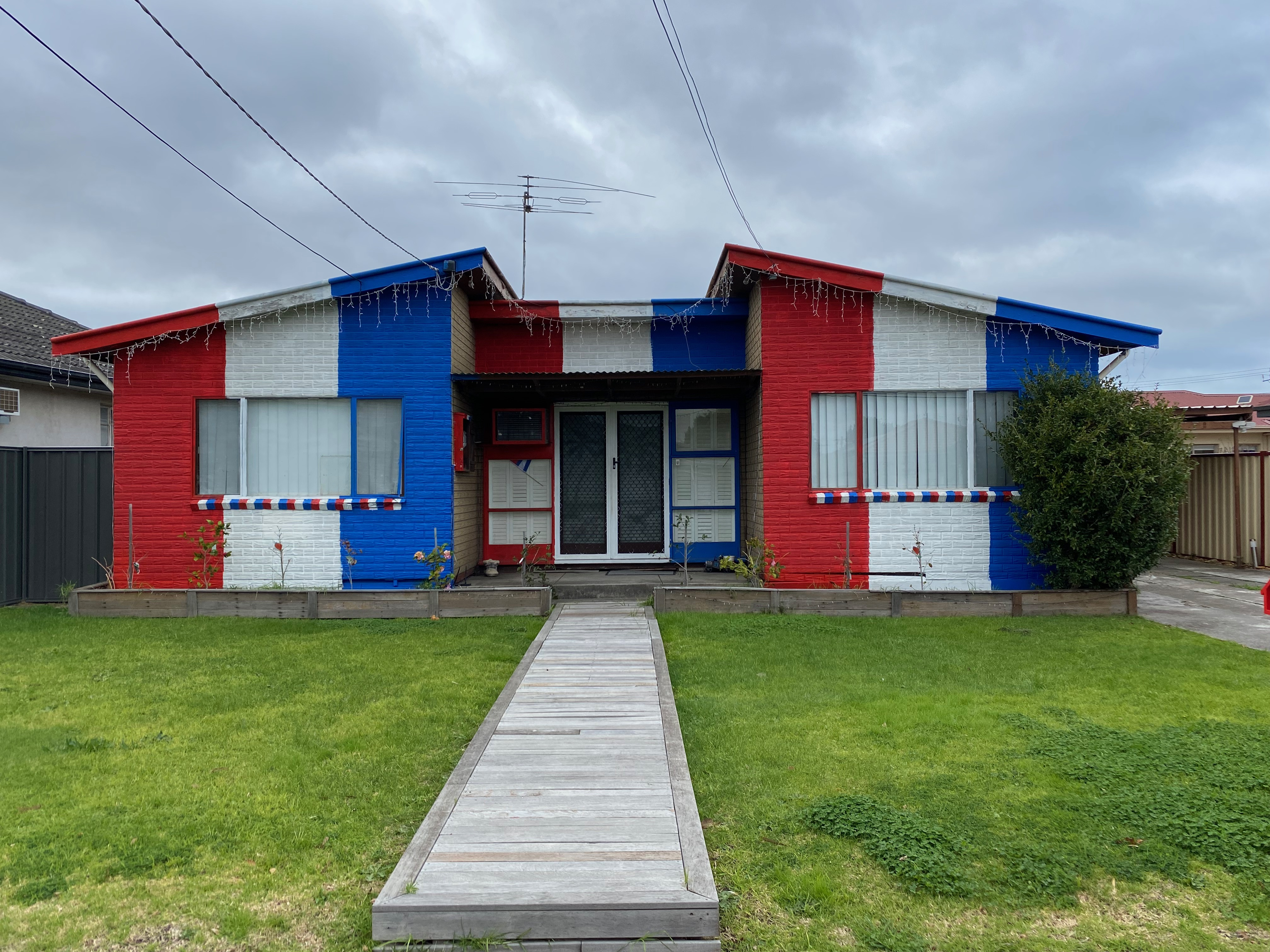
Home in Altona North painted in Western Bulldogs team colours

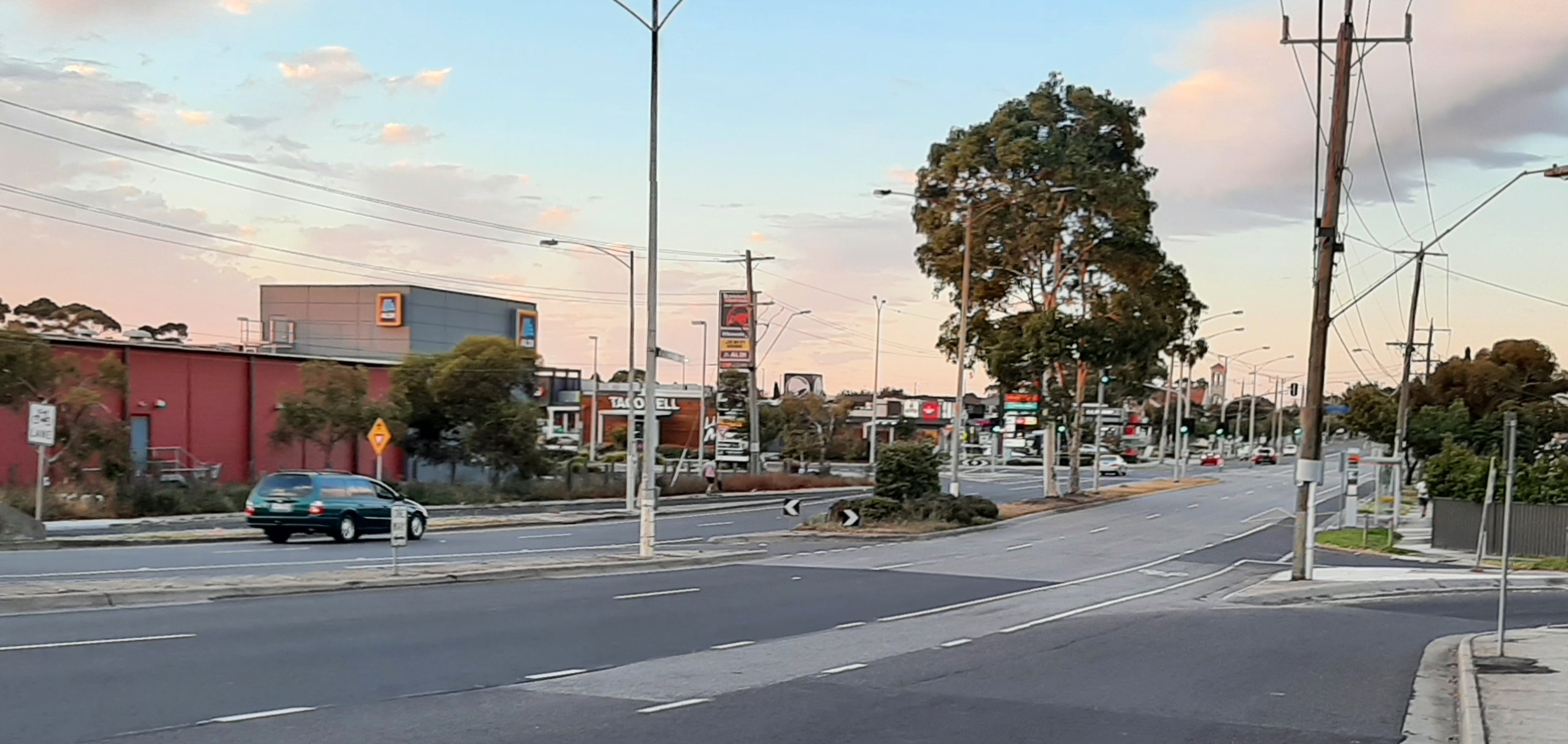
Millers Road

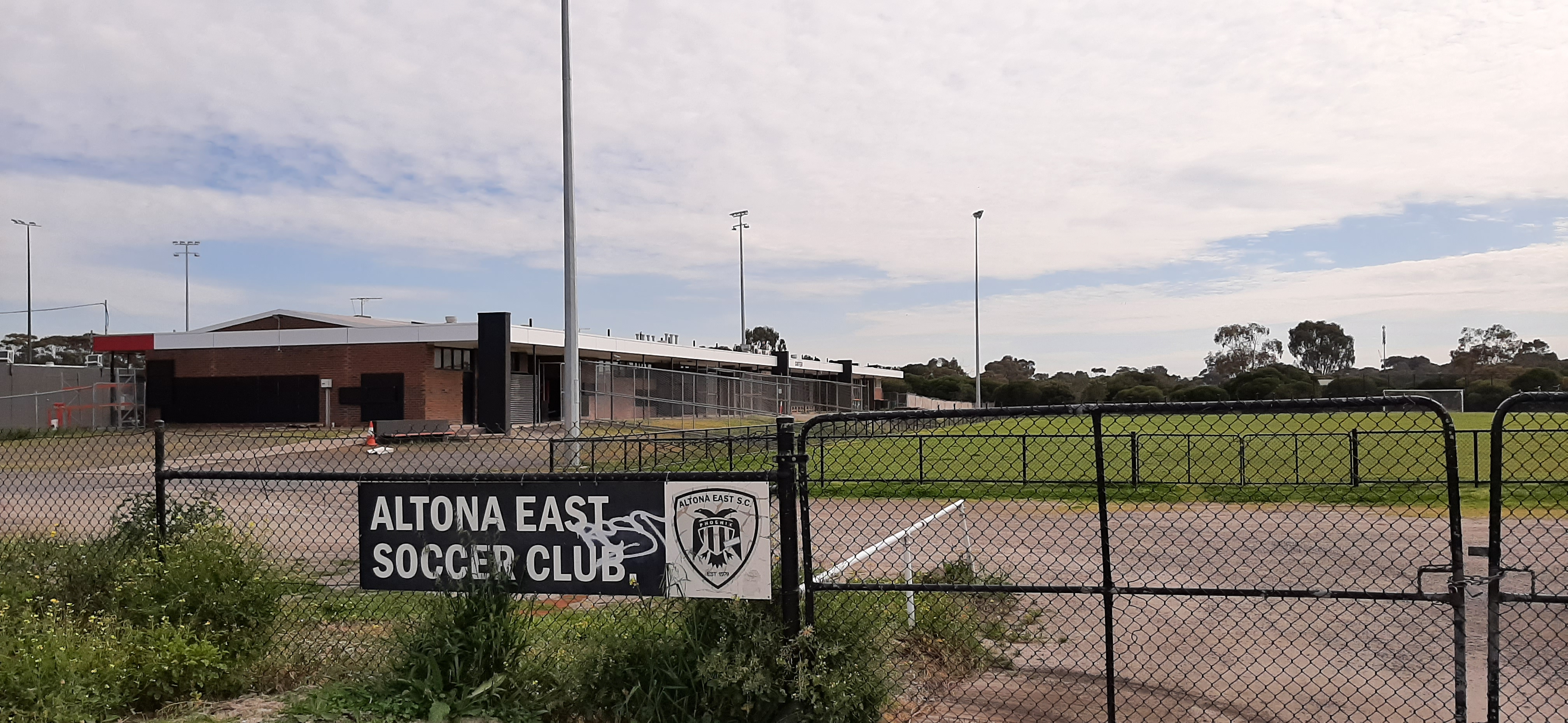
Paisley Park Soccer Complex

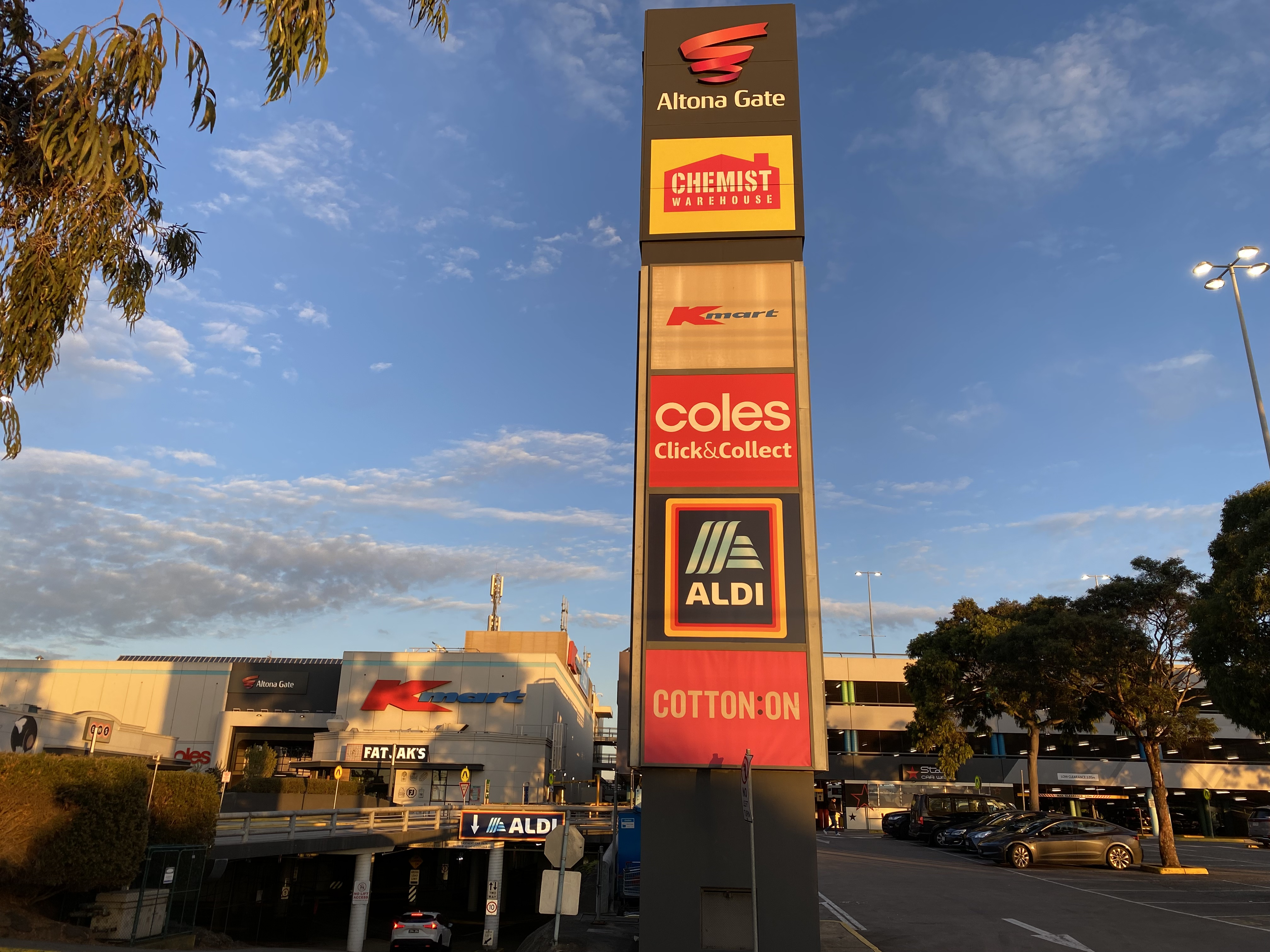
Altona Gate Shopping Centre

== See also ==
- City of Altona – Altona North was previously within this former local government area.
- Altona Memorial Park – cemetery and crematorium on Dohertys Road
