= Western Suburbs SC =

Australian Football club, based in Melbourne, VIC

Western Suburbs
- Full name: Western Suburbs Soccer Club
- Nicknames: Panellinios, Suburbs
- Short name: Western Suburbs
- Founded: 1965
- Ground: Ralph Reserve
- Manager: Jim Gacovski
- League: Victorian State League Division 1 North-West
- 2024: 7th
- Website: http://www.westernsuburbssc.com/
Home colours	Away colours

Western Suburbs Soccer Club is an association football club based in the suburb of Sunshine, Melbourne, Victoria, Australia. The club was formed in 1965 and currently competes in the Victorian State League Division 1 North-West. Western Suburbs have participated in the Victorian Premier League on two occasions.

== History ==
Western Suburbs SC was formed in the Western Suburbs of Melbourne, Sunshine in 1965 by local Greek and Greek Cypriot immigrants. Since then the club has become home to many Greeks that live around the area, who enjoy the social club at Western Suburbs SC.

Western Suburbs SC has participated in the Victorian State League six times, and Victorian Premier League twice. Western Suburbs highest finish in the Victorian State League was 1st, while the highest finish in the Victorian Premier League was 9th. The longest stay in the Victorian State Leagues was 5 seasons, between 1984 and 1988. Western Suburbs have consistently stayed in the top divisions in Melbourne.

In 2015, on their 60th anniversary Western Suburbs won the Victorian State League Division 1 North-West championship.

In 2018, Suburbs were relegated from State League 1 North-West, finishing the season in bottom place.

After four seasons in State League 2 North-West, Suburbs gain promotion back to State League 1 North-West after being taken over by new board members.

In 2024, after promotion, Suburbs had a fairly successful year in State League 1 North-West and finished the season mid table.

== Former coaches ==
- Les Scheinflug - Australian Assistant Coach at the 1974 World Cup and also Senior Coach of Australia in 1981–1984, 1990 & 1994. Now retired.
- Vlado Vanis - Coached many Australian teams including the Melbourne Knights, Heidelberg United & Preston Lions.
- Michael Chatzitrifonos - Coached Western Suburbs in a tremendous season in the VPL in 2007.
- Kon Pappas - Coached Western Suburbs during the 2008 season in the VPL.
- Ange Postecoglou - Started his coaching career at Suburbs in 1994. Regarded as one of the best Australian coaches.

== Former players ==
- (Greece) Mimis Papaioannou
- (Australia) Ange Postecoglou
- (Australia) Victor Cristaldo
- (Australia) Adrian Zahra
- (Australia) Lorenz Kindtner
- (Indonesia) Iswadi Idris
- (Burkina Faso) Germain Bationo

== Titles ==
- Victorian State Division 2 Champions 1972
- Victorian State Division 1 Champions 1979
- Victorian State Division 1 Champions 1983
- Victorian State Division 1 Champions 2006
- Hellenic Cup Champions 2012
- Victorian State Division 1 Champions 2015

== Current squad ==
- (Australia) Louis Paolozza (C)
- (Australia) George Fakos
- (Australia) Savvas Thalalaios
- (Colombia) Sebastian Londoño
- (Australia) Peter Koufidis
- (Australia) Christopher Iacovou (GK)
- (Australia) Nikitas Iacovou
- (Australia) Dimitri Hatzimouratis
- (Australia) Goran Petrovski
- (Australia) Luke Pavlou
- (Nigeria) Ugochukwu Obi Moneke
- (Japan) Tatsuhiro Takezaki
- (Australia) Lucas Muscat
- (Australia) Oner Kucuk
- (Australia) Ryan Gomes
- (Australia) Okilo Dimo
- (Australia) Aleksandar Pavasovic
- (Australia) Damon Camilleri (GK)
- (Australia) Manyiel Aguer
- (Australia) Errol Fehmi
- (Australia) Mabior Deng
- (Wales) Lewis Bamford
- (Australia) Dusan Bosnjak
- (England) Scott Bakkor

== Coaches ==
- (Australia) Jim Gacovski
- (Australia) Doug Mladenovic
