= Victorian Premier League (1991–2013) =

- Organising body: Football Federation Victoria
- Founded: 1991; 35 years ago
- First season: 1991
- Folded: 2013; 13 years ago
- Country: Australia
- State: Victoria
- Divisions: 1
- Last champions: Northcote City (2013)
- Most championships: Green Gully (6 titles)
- Most premierships: Green Gully (4 titles)

The Victorian Premier League was a Victorian men's soccer league that was founded in 1991 after the dissolution of the original Victorian State League and administered by Football Federation Victoria (FFV) (now Football Victoria). The league ran for 22 years before ultimately folding in 2013 as the FFV joined the National Premier Leagues introducing the National Premier Leagues Victoria.

== History ==
In 1991, the Victorian Premier League was introduced and the first finals to determine the champions were staged in 1992, won by the newly promoted North Geelong. Following the demise of the NSL in 2004, the remaining two Victorian NSL teams Melbourne Knights and South Melbourne were granted permission to play in the VPL season of 2005. The league received a major boost at the start of the 2005 season when Vodafone became major naming rights sponsors, with the competition being renamed the Vodafone Cup. The 2005 season initially saw crowds attending in record numbers to witness the return of old derbies such as that between South Melbourne and Heidelberg United, but with the formation of the A-League filling the void of a national domestic league, 2006 saw a sharp decline in attendances.

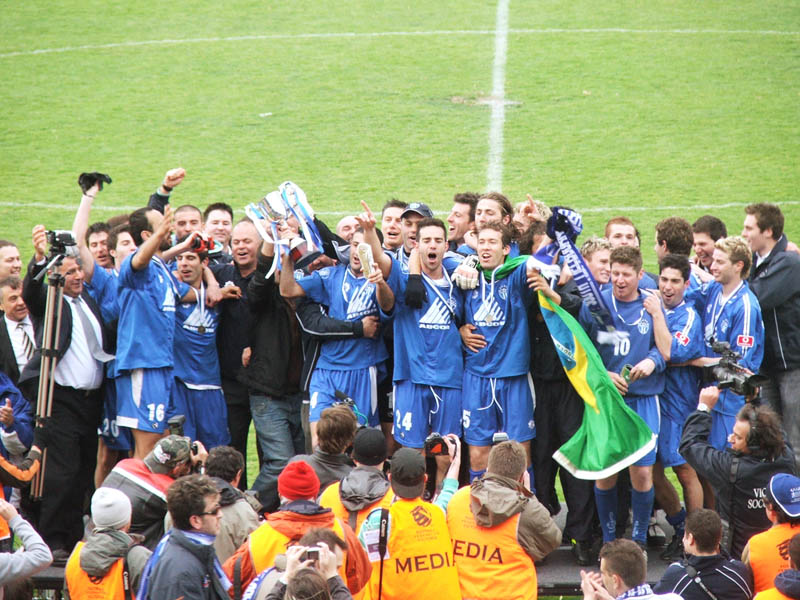
South Melbourne celebrating their 2006 Victorian Premier League title.

The end of the 2006 season also witnessed a controversial finish to the relegation battle. With three teams finishing on 30 points, Sunshine George Cross were relegated on goal difference. However, a post-season appeal to the tribunal on the grounds that Essendon Royals had fielded a suspended player (Ilcho Mladenovski in round 24) saw the Royals deducted a point and relegated. Ultimately, both clubs reprised their position in the following season's competition with the inclusion of the Australian Institute of Sport evening out the numbers to 16, and as the first part of reforms to the competition set to be brought about in 2008.

Preston Lions 2007 Victorian Premier League Grand Final title.

The Australian Institute of Sport experiment was largely derided by the local clubs, and after their removal from the competition in 2008, the league reverted to 12 teams and a Top 5 Finals-Series in 2009. However, the concept of a youth development squad was reintroduced in 2010 with the National Training Centre team playing in midweek fixtures throughout the season but not for competition points. In 2011 the team, mostly comprising players from the Melbourne Victory youth squad, was renamed Victorian Training Centre Football and was eligible to score competition points for its matches but ineligible to qualify for the finals series or be relegated.

On 15 September 2013, Victoria Police arrested up to ten people, including Southern Stars FC players David Obaze, Nick McKoy and Joe Woolley as well as the coach, Zaya Younan, for allegations of match fixing. They are expected to be charged with corrupting the outcome of betting.

== Winners ==
Season	Champions	Premiers
1991	Brunswick Juventus	
1992	North Geelong	North Geelong
1993	Bulleen	Bulleen
1994	Preston Lions	Preston Lions
1995	Altona Magic	Port Melbourne
1996	Altona Magic	Altona Magic
1997	Altona Magic	Altona Magic
1998	Bulleen Inter Kings	St Albans Saints
1999	Green Gully	
2000	Green Gully	
2001	Heidelberg United	Port Melbourne
2002	Preston Lions	Fawkner

Season	Champions	Premiers
2003	Green Gully	Preston Lions
2004	Bulleen Zebras	Green Gully
2005	Green Gully	Green Gully
2006	South Melbourne	Oakleigh Cannons
2007	Preston Lions	Preston Lions
2008	Altona Magic	Green Gully
2009	Altona Magic	Dandenong Thunder
2010	Green Gully	Richmond
2011	Green Gully	Green Gully
2012	Dandenong Thunder	Dandenong Thunder
2013	Northcote City	Northcote City
