= Greater Dandenong FC =

Greater Dandenong
- Full name: Greater Dandenong Football Club
- Nickname: Eagle
- Founded: 1953 (as Alemannia Richmond)
- Ground: WJ Turner Reserve
- Chairman: David Foste
- Manager: Oscar Farto
- League: Victorian State League 3
- 2025: 12th (relegated)
Home colours	Away colours	Third colours

Greater Dandenong Football Club is an Australian soccer club from Dandenong, Victoria, an eastern suburb of Melbourne, Australia. Greater Dandenong most recently competed in the Victorian State League Division 1 South-East competition, the third tier of football in Victoria, after successive relegations in 2016 and 2017. They changed club name in 2024 relocating to Greater Dandenong.

== History ==
The club was formed in 1953 and has historically been associated with Melbourne's German Australian community. Originally based in the north west Melbourne suburb of Maribyrnong, in 1955 the club became affiliated with the Melbourne German Club (Deutscher Verein Melbourne), Club Tivoli, and relocated to Richmond. It then adopted the name Alemannia Richmond Soccer Club.

The team has had three stints in the highest Victorian football division, in 1961,1963 and 2006–2013. Richmond's most successful season was 2010, finishing as the Minor Premiers and the runners-up in the Victorian Premier League Grand Final.

=== National Premier Leagues Victoria (2014–2017) ===
Logo before relocation of the club

In late 2013, Richmond were accepted into the newly formed National Premier Leagues Victoria competition, being placed into the NPL1, essentially the new second tier of football in Victoria, retaining the tier they competed in the season prior. In the inaugural NPL1 season, despite the goalscoring heroics of star striker Tom Cahill, who finished as the league's top goalscorer, the side could only manage a 4th-placed finish, missing out on promotion.

The following season, the club confirmed their return to the top flight, taking out the NPL1 East championship, beating Melbourne Victory Youth to the title by two points. In mid-November 2015, Richmond confirmed that Nick Crivelli and former Socceroo Fausto De Amicis would be assistants to senior head coach Rick Mensink in season 2016.

Richmond's recruiting for their return to the top flight began in tough stead, losing key individuals Tom Cahill to Hume City FC and Josh Knights to St Albans Saints SC, but pulled off a coup in bringing former Dutch youth international Geert Arend Roorda of FC Dordrecht to the club. Richmond continued to bolster their squad, announcing the signings of Jake Barker-Daish and New Zealand international Liam Higgins three weeks out from the start of the season. The club also added former Port Melbourne SC duo Bryan Bran and Kris Kioussis just out from the start of the season.

Richmond's first season back in the top flight began in difficult fashion, collecting one point in its opening four fixtures, conceding 17 goals in the process. The club then faced top-of-the-table South Melbourne FC but surprisingly came out on top in a 6–3 win at Kevin Bartlett Reserve. Richmond finished the season in 12th place in the 14 team league, setting up a promotion / relegation playoff against North Geelong Warriors FC. In the playoff match, North Geelong ran out 4–0 victors, sending the Eagles down to NPL2 for 2017. After the loss, head coach Rick Mensink stepped down from his role.

Former Sunshine George Cross and North Shine Eagles coach Paul Donnelly was appointed as the senior head coach for the 2017 season in October 2016. At the half-way mark of the season, with Richmond languishing in second-bottom place of the NPL Victoria 2 East ladder, the club made a change and brought in Brian Vanega to lead the club, relieving Donnelly of his duties.

On August 20, 2017, it was confirmed Richmond SC 1953 would finish 10th in the NPL2 East division, placing the club in the relegation position to State League 1. It concluded a horrid 2 years for the club which saw the club be relegated back to back and potentially losing its NPL status.

On 15 September 2017 it was announced the club would vote on October 5, 2017, to appoint liquidators and ceasing operations. However, after negotiations, the club reached an agreement with interested parties that would see them avoid liquidation and play in the Victorian State League 1 South-East in 2018. The new major sponsor was revealed to be Electricity Wizard. Daniel Cobb, the CEO of Electricity Wizard, replaced Dave Foster as the new club president and Matthew McNamara was appointed treasurer. Richmond appointed Sam Poutakidis as the new head coach for the 2018 season. Oscar Farto took over from Poutakidis midway through the 2018 season, with Richmond in 2nd place, where it would eventually finish the 2018 State League 1 season.

In 2019 Richmond finished in 4th place in State League 1.

== Colours ==
Their former home kit colours of black and white, were symbolic of their German heritage. Their away colours are green and black.

== Kit manufacturers and shirt sponsors ==
Richmond's shirts have been made by kit manufacturers including Nike, Adidas, Concave, and now Armadura.

== Stadium and training grounds ==
Greater Dandenong FC currently play their home games at WJ Turner Reserve in Noble Park North, a suburb in the central north of the City of Greater Dandenong.

As Richmond SC, the club formerly played their play their home matches at Kevin Bartlett Reserve in Burnley, Victoria, the ground named after the Richmond Australian Rules footballer, Kevin Bartlett.

== Former head coach ==
- (Spain) Oscar Farto

== Former players ==
- (Australia) Tomislav Uskok
- (New Zealand) Liam Higgins
- (Greece) Evangelos Skraparas
- (England) Steve Burton
- (Malaysia) Ryan Lambert
- (Australia) Melissa Barbieri

== Honours ==
=== Richmond SC ===
- Victorian Premier League:
  - Premiers (1): 2010
  - Runners-Up (1): 2010
  - Finalists (2): 2008, 2010
- National Premier Leagues Victoria 1
  - Champions (1): 2015
- National Premier Leagues Victoria 1 East
  - Premiers (1): 2015
- Victorian Division 1 South:
  - Champions (2): 1960, 1962
- Victorian State League Division 2:
  - Champions (1): 1991
- Victorian State League Division 2 South-East:
  - Champions (1): 2003
