= Hume City FC =

Hume City
- Full name: Hume City Football Club
- Nicknames: Anadoluspor; Anadolu (Anatolians)
- Founded: 1979; 47 years ago (as Holland Park Football Club)
- Ground: Nasiol Stadium
- Capacity: 3,000
- Chairman: Ersan Gulum
- Manager: Nick Hegarty
- League: NPL Victoria
- 2024: 7th of 14
- Website: www.humecityfc.com
Home colours	Away colours

Hume City Football Club is a semi-professional football club based in Broadmeadows, a suburb of Melbourne, Australia. Established by the local Turkish Australian community, the club competes in the National Premier Leagues Victoria.

The club, known by the local Turkish Australian community as Anadoluspor, is the most successful Turkish Australian-backed football club in Australia.

Hume City has senior men's, women's and junior boys and girls teams, all based out of John Ilhan Memorial Reserve.

== History ==
The club was established as Holland Park Football Club in 1979 by Cengiz Binyazar, Halit Kirdar and Abdullah Saglam. The club officially registered with the Victorian Soccer Federation in 1979, with Emin Aslan holding the position of president in its inaugural season.

In 1993, the club decided on a change of direction and to take the club to higher places, out of the amateur divisions. The first step was the move to Reddish Reserve and to rename the club North Coburg Soccer Club. The club took on many more juniors. North Coburg achieved promotion from State League 4 in 1996, finishing the season in second place, and promoted again from State League 3 in 1999, finishing third. In the club's first ever season in Victorian State League Division 2 Nth-West it finished in fourth place, narrowly missing out on a promotion playoff place. In 2001, the club made the finals series after placing 3rd in the league but didn't win the playoff. In 2002, after coming close the previous two season, the club achieved promotion from State League 2 N/W to State League 1, the highest level the club had ever reached. The club achieved four successive mid-table finishes in State League 1.

In 2006, the club was known as Coburg United Soccer Club and played its home matches at Knights Stadium in North Sunshine, Victoria. North Coburg achieved promotion in 2007 after a 2nd-place finish to reach the Victorian Premier League for the first time in the club's history. The achievement marked a meteoric rise by the club, achieving four promotions in eleven years to go from State League 4 to the top division. After making it into the Premier League in 2007, the club was almost relegated. They were saved only by a 93rd-minute header by one of its local heroes Tansel Başer against Frankston Pines.

The club was renamed Hume City Football Club in 2009, when they moved to their new facilities at Broadmeadows Valley Park, in the City of Hume. A huge occasion was marked in 2014 when Hume officially opened up its new $12m facilities which included three grass pitches, a "3G" pitch, a state-of-the-art grandstand and modern clubrooms and changeroom facilities. The club underwent yet another re-brand in 2015, changing their logo "for a new identity, to represent the club's past, present and future".

Hume managed a 6th-placed finish in 2014, the first season of the newly formed 14-team National Premier Leagues Victoria, what was former known as the Victorian Premier League.

In 2015, Hume qualified for the reintroduced finals series after a 5th-placed finish. City went on to beat Melbourne Knights on penalties in the elimination final, after goalkeeper Chris Oldfield saved all four of Knights' penalties in the penalty shootout. The club then lost to eventual winners Bentleigh Greens. That same season, Hume went on an impressive FFA Cup run. They drew Queensland NPL side Brisbane Strikers in the Round of 32 and looked set to bow out, but managed a 91st-minute equaliser and went on to win 4–3 in extra time. The Broadmeadows side then drew New South Wales' Sydney Olympic, another former NSL club, in the Round of 16 and won 3–1 in front of over 1,500 people at the ABD Stadium. In the quarter finals, the Club defeated fellow NPL Victoria side Oakleigh Cannons 3–2, with a 118th-minute winner from Marcus Schroen, in front of 1,504 people at ABD Stadium. The club then played defending A-League champions Melbourne Victory, but went down 3–0 to the premiers and champions of Australia. 6,575 people attended the fixture in what was City's highest ever attendance for a home fixture.

In the off-season, Anadolu were dealt blows when midfielder Schroen left for NPL rivals South Melbourne and winger Jai Ingham signed for A-League side Melbourne Victory. Hume qualified for the 2016 FFA Cup, drawing NPL NSW 2 side Marconi Stallions at home. In July 2016, Hume announced that head coach Lupce Acevski departed the club "by my mutual consent". Then technical director Dean Hennessy took over as caretaker coach for the rest of the 2016 season. In the FFA Cup clash, Marconi took the lead in extra time. Hume, upholding their reputation in the Cup as "comeback kings", equalised in the 117th minute, eventually winning the clash in a penalty shoot-out. In the Round of 16, Hume again drew Melbourne Victory. Besart Berisha's first half penalty decided the fixture in front of 2,866 people, the largest ever crowd at ABD Stadium. Hume City finished 6th in the league, losing 3–0 to South Melbourne in the Elimination Final.

After the 2016 season, the senior squad went through major change, re-signing just five players from the previous season. Hume made a coaching change in May 2017, with Ufuk Kubilayhan appointed to take over from David Chick. Hume qualified for the 2017 FFA Cup, but lost in the Round of 32 to Bentleigh. In the league, Hume finished in 8th place, after Nick Hegarty became player-coach in July.

Hume City finished in 11th place in 2018, also losing 2–1 to Richmond SC in the FFA Cup qualifying rounds, Richmond competing in State League Division 1, two divisions below Hume.

Hume City won the 2019 Dockerty Cup with a 1–0 win over Melbourne Knights FC. The trophy was Hume's first Dockerty Cup win and first piece of major silverware in the club's history.

== Current squad ==
As of 28 March, 2026

Note: Flags indicate national team as defined under FIFA eligibility rules; some limited exceptions apply. Players may hold more than one non-FIFA nationality.

No.	Pos.	Nation	Player
1	GK	IRL	Christopher Oldfield
2	DF	AUS	Joshua Wilkins
3	DF	SRI	Zahi Addis
4	DF	NZL	Taylor Schrijvers
5	DF	AUS	Brayden Spink
6	DF	AUS	Joshua Okane
7	FW	AUS	Adisu Bayew
8	MF	AUS	Steve Whyte
9	FW	SSD	Godfrey Debele
10	MF	AUS	Birkan Kirdar
11	FW	AUS	Josh Bingham

No.	Pos.	Nation	Player
12	DF	ENG	Jacob Adams
13	GK	AUS	Damon Camilleri
14	MF	LBN	Khoder Kaddour
15	DF	AUS	John Paikopoulos
16	MF	AUS	Kaylin Acar
17	MF	AUS	Moonib Adus
18	DF	AUS	Aidan Coyne
19	MF	AUS	Barancem Kavak
20	FW	AUS	Frank Busasa
23	FW	MEX	Christopher Engelhart
24	MF	JPN	Aiki Tsukamoto
28	DF	AUS	Aaron Calver

== Women ==
Hume City entered a women's team in the Football Federation Victoria Women's State League 4 North competition in 2017, the fifth and bottom tier of women's football in the state. In its first year in the competition, City won the league winning every single one of its 18 games, finishing with a goal differential of +186, conceding just five goals all year. Ebru Hasan scored 93 goals.

The following season, Hume City won a second straight championship and promotion, winning the Women's State League 3 West with three games to spare, by winning 15 consecutive games in the league. In a sign of their dominance, Hume won three games by 13 goals, one by 12 and one by 11. On 10 August 2018, Hume dropped its first game since entering the Victorian state league system when it lost 4–0 to St Albans Saints SC.

== Honours ==
- Victorian Amateur League Division 2 (1): 1981
- Victorian Provisional League Division 4 (1): 1982
- Victorian Metropolitan League Division 4 (1): 1988
- Dockerty Cup (1): 2019
