= Altona Magic SC =

Australian soccer team

Altona Magic
- Full name: Altona Magic Soccer Club
- Nicknames: Magic, Vardar, Gate
- Founded: 1968; 58 years ago
- Ground: Paisley Park Soccer Complex; Altona North, Victoria
- Capacity: 5,000
- President: Marijan Tasevski
- Manager: Goran Lozanovski
- League: NPL Victoria
- 2026: 11th of 14
- Website: www.altonamagic.com.au
Home colours	Away colours

Altona Magic Soccer Club (Commonly known as Altona Vardar SC) is a soccer team based in Altona North, a western suburb of Melbourne, Victoria, Australia. The Magic currently compete in National Premier Leagues Victoria, the second tier of the Australian soccer league system. Founded in 1968, Altona Magic plays out of Paisley Park Soccer Complex. The club has won the Victorian Premier League on 5 occasions in seasons 1995, 1996, 1997, 2008 and 2009. In 2019, Altona made a return to the National Premier Leagues Victoria, following successive promotions in 2017 via the Victorian State League Division 1 and again in 2018 via National Premier Leagues Victoria 2 (West), both seasons Magic were crowned champions.

== History ==
Altona Magic Soccer Club located in the west of Melbourne has been playing in the state elite competition the Victorian Premier League since 1989. The club has won 5 championships and produced many Australian internationals. The club colours of red and black signify the famous Macedonian Football Club, FK Vardar Skopje. Since the formation of the football club the Macedonian Community and Macedonian media continue to call the club the Vardar Football Club.

In 1967 a group of Macedonian immigrants passionate about football initiated a meeting in Yarraville with the idea of forming a football team and by 1968 the team was registered as the Kingsville Soccer Club. The team played at Wembley Park, Yarraville (1968 to 1974) in the Victorian lower amateur leagues.

In 1975 the Kingsville Soccer Club committee successfully acquired debt riddled German backed club Central Altona, with the successful acquisition the club shifted to Gray Reserve, Williamstown and played in the Victorian Provisional League Division 1 (1975 to 1979).

In 1979 the club's desire to compete in the higher divisions of Victoria arrived with the amalgamation of first division strugglers Keilor City (German backed). The amalgamation brought the club to Division One and with a large membership base the club successfully negotiating with the Altona City Council to tenant the Paisley Park Soccer Complex, a master facility of its time and the current home of the club.

The club renamed itself to Altona Gate Soccer Club in 1980 and for next 8 years competed in the Victorian Division 1 League. In 1988 the first success was achieved, the club won promotion to the State League (VPL) by finishing League Runners-Up.

By 1996 the club incorporated the name Altona Magic Soccer Club, this was at time when Soccer Australia (now Football Federation Australia) encouraged all clubs to remove all ethnic affiliated names and logos from all clubs across Australia.

The most successful period in the club's history was in the 1990s, Altona won 3 consecutive VPL championships in 1995, 96 and 97. The club added two more championship trophies in 2008 and 2009, this confirmed the club's position as one of the most successful clubs in Victorian Football.

In 2010, after a horrific season in the Victorian Premier League, Altona Magic were relegated to the Victorian State League Division 1. The 2011 season became the first time since 1988 that Altona was to compete below the top tier of football in Victoria.

Magic spent seasons 2011–2013 in the Victorian State League Division 1 finishing mid-table each time, which was the second tier at the time. In 2014, following the introduction of the National Premier Leagues Victoria, which Vardar was not accepted in to, the club then competed in the regionalised Victorian State League Division 1 North-West, the new third tier of football in Victoria. In 2014 and 2015, the club again finished mid-table on both occasions.

Led by the likes of Jon Mcshane, Adamson Ajayi and Jason Hayne, Altona Magic took out the State League 1 North-West title in 2016, topping the table all year long. Magic then took out the overall State League 1 championship, defeating State League 1 South-East title holders Mornington SC.

After the 2016 title-winning season, Altona Magic confirmed its ambition to join the National Premier Leagues Victoria. It appointed Goran Lozanovski as senior head coach, replacing the incumbent Vlado Tortevski, and signed the likes of Amadu Koroma from South Melbourne, Joey Franjić from Hume City, Greg Lombardo from Northcote City and Michael Stark from Port Melbourne. The club was successful in going back-to-back in 2017, winning the State League 1 title and gaining promotion into the NPL Victoria 2, the state's second tier domestic league.

In the off-season, Magic signed Bentleigh Greens championship winning duo Troy Ruthven and Ben Litfin, Green Gully's Rani Dowisha, Pascoe Vale's Mark Pistininzi and Heidelberg United's Jordan Wilkes. The signings, all of whom played in Victoria's top tier the season prior, signalled Magic's intent for the 2018 season. On 11 August 2018, in the club's 50th year of existence, Altona won the NPL2 West championship with three games to spare, following a 2–0 win over Brunswick City SC. Magic led the competition for the large majority of the season and finished 11 points clear at the top of the table.

In 2019, after a positive start to the season, long-term injuries to Michiel Hemmen, Jon McShane and Ross Archibald stretched the squad and ultimately fell away from finals contention, picking up just 1 point in its last 7 games and finished in 11th position in its first season back in the Victorian top flight.

In 2020, due to the COVID-19 situation, Football Victoria decided to cancel the 2020 season and leaving Altona Magic in dead last, 14th after just 5 games played. It was decided by the board of Football Victoria, that there will be no relegation or champion crowned for the 2020 season.

Senior Head Coach Goran Lozanovski, who was appointed in 2016 and lead Altona Magic to two Championships in 2017 and 2018 in his four-year stint at the helm, also parted ways shortly after the cancellation of the 2020 season. On 26 September 2020, it was announced John Markovski, would be named his successor for the 2021 season.

In the 2021 season, following a poor run or results, Savvas Patikkis was named as the clubs Senior Head Coach for the remainder of the season and then confirmed for the 2022 season.

In 2023, John Markovski returned to the role of Senior Head Coach. He brought an immediate improvement to the club, guiding them to 6th place in the 2023 season and subsequently into their first finals series since 2009. Magic would eventually lose in the elimination final to Oakleigh. His son, Jonas Markovski, won the 2023 NPL Victoria golden boot, scoring 19 goals.

John Markovski resigned from his role as head coach in October 2023. Scott Miller was initially appointed as his replacement, but also resigned a few days later, citing family reasons. On November 2 2023, Goran Lozanovski was announced as the new head coach for the 2024 season.

== Current squad ==
Note: Flags indicate national team as defined under FIFA eligibility rules; some limited exceptions apply. Players may hold more than one non-FIFA nationality.

No.	Pos.	Nation	Player
1	GK	AUS	Casey Went
2	DF	JPN	Hiyori Kawaguchi
3	DF	AUS	Lachlan Gillard
4	DF	AUS	Lirim Elmazi
5	DF	AUS	Garang Arou
6	DF	AUS	John Stojcevski
7	FW	AUS	John Mabok
8	MF	AUS	Brandon Lauton
9	FW	AUS	Eric Kostandini Ziu
10	MF	MAR	Aymane Sordo
11	FW	AUS	Owen McCloskey
12	DF	AUS	Kristian Bombaci

No.	Pos.	Nation	Player
13	MF	AUS	Gavin Tasevski
14	FW	AUS	Geoffry Lino
15	DF	AUS	Alexander Gust
16	MF	AUS	Brian Sutomo
17	FW	AUS	Daniel Fabrizio
19	MF	AUS	Phillip Hatzopoulos
20	FW	AUS	Julian Rodriguez
21	GK	AUS	Brandon Cuminao
22	FW	SRI	Oliver Kelaart
--	DF	ENG	Josh Heaton

== Honours ==
- Victorian Premier League/ NPL Victoria Champions 1995, 1996, 1997, 2008, 2009
- Victorian Premier League/ NPL Victoria Runners Up 2004, 2006
- Victorian Premier League/ NPL Victoria Finalists 1994, 1998, 2003, 2005, 2023
- NPL2 Victoria Champions 2018
- Victorian State League Division 1 Champions 2016, 2017
- Victorian State League Division 1 Runners Up 1988
- Dockerty Cup Runners Up 1989
- Maso Cup Champions 2008, 2014, 2023
- Macedonian Cup of Victoria Champions 2010, 2012, 2014, 2017, 2026

== Notable former coaches ==
- (England) Ian Dobson
- (Australia) Goran Lozanovski
- (Australia) John Markovski

== Individual honours ==
VPL Player of the Year

- 1997 – George Jolevski
- 2001 – Zoran Todorovski
- 2004 – Doug Mladenovic
- 2006 – Sash Becvinovski

Bill Fleming Medal

- 1997 – George Jolevski

VPL Coach of the Year

- 1995 – Ian Dobson
- 1996 – Gary Cole

VPL Top Goalscorer Award/NPL Victoria Golden Boot

- 1998 – Sash Becvinovski
- 2006 – Sash Becvinovski
- 2023 – Jonas Markovski

VPL Goalkeeper of the Year

- 1997 – Darren McGrath

Jimmy Rooney Medal

- 1995 – Chris Emsovski
- 1996 – Darren McGrath
- 1997 – Savva Rusmir
- 2004 – Levent Osman
- 2009 – Kliment Taseski
