= 2011 Mirabella Cup =

Tournament details
- Country: Australia
- Teams: 130

Final positions
- Champions: Northcote City SC
- Runners-up: Melbourne Knights

The 2011 Mirabella Cup was the first edition of a football (soccer) knockout-cup competition held between men's clubs in Victoria, Australia in 2011, the annual edition of the Dockerty Cup. It was to be unique in Australian football in that the competition was to integrate clubs from the national top-level league, the A-League, with the state system below. However, the Football Federation Australia later withdrew their permission for Melbourne Victory and Melbourne Heart to take part in the competition while the first rounds were already ongoing, citing confusion of fans in marketing an as yet unannounced national knockout cup competition, which the FFA described in a press announcement announcing their reversal as still being in a stage of consideration, and not yet having a viable plan.

Northcote City SC defeated Melbourne Knights in the final to win their first Victorian top-level silverware.

The Regional Challenge Cup was won by Cobram Victory.

== Teams ==
Round	Clubs remaining	Clubs involved	Winners from previous round	New entries this round	Leagues/Teams entering at this round
Zone Playoffs	130	104	none	104	Victorian State League Division 2 Victorian State League Division 3 Victorian Provisional Leagues; Victorian Metropolitan Leagues; Regional Leagues
Zone Semi-finals	48	48	24	24	Victorian Premier League; Victorian State League Division 1
Zone Finals	24	24	24	none	none
Super 12	12	12	12	none	none
Round of 6	6	6	6	none	none
Semi-finals	4	4	4	none	none
Final	2	2	2	none	none

== First round Playoffs ==
Round 1 will contain clubs below State League 1. Clubs will play teams in their Zones and some teams will have a bye which automatically puts them into the second round. The draw was held on 8 March 2011 at 7pm, and broadcast live by webcam.

Central Draw

19 March	Middle Park	2–1	Elwood City	Elwood Park
15:00 AEDT

Bye	v	Maribyrnong Greens

19 March	Yarra Jets	0–6	Yarraville Glory	McIvor Reserve
15:00 AEDT

19 March	South Yarra	1–0	Melbourne University Rangers	Ardeer Reserve
12:00 AEDT

Old Melburnians	v	Bye

Bye	v	Albert Park

Bye	v	Bye

Collingwood City	v	Bye

Eastern Draw

19 March	Monash University	3–1	Ringwood City	Monash University Sports Ground
15:00 AEDT

19 March	Waverley Wanderers	5–0	Brandon Park	Lemnian Community Centre
14:00 AEDT

22 March	Mooroolbark SC	3–2	Croydon City Arrows
19:00 AEDT

Monbulk Rangers SC	v	Bye

North-West Draw

Bye	v	Moreland City

Brunswick City	v	Bye

Bye	v	FC Strathmore

19 March	Moreland Wolves	3 – 3 (a.e.t.) (5–4 p)	Moreland United	Reddish Reserve
15:00 AEDT

Melbourne Tornado	v	Bye

Bye	v	Fawkner Soccer Club

Bye	v	Bye

Essendon Royals	v	Bye

North East Draw

Bye	v	Box Hill United

Doncaster Rovers	v	Bye

Nunawading City	v	Bye

19 March	Eltham Redbacks FC	4 – 4 (a.e.t.) (4–5 p)	Riversdale	Eltham North Reserve
15:00 AEDT

Bye	v	Ashburton

Old Scotch	v	Bye

Bye	v	Bye

19 March	DOC United	0–3	Whitehorse United	Darebin International Sports Centre
15:00 AEDT

Northern Draw

19 March	Darebin United	0–1	Heidelberg Stars	Darebin International Sports Centre
12:00 AEDT

Banyule City	v	Bye

Bye	v	Bye

Bye	v	Northern Falcons

Bundoora United	v	Bye

La Trobe University	v	Bye

Plenty Valley Lions	v	Bye

19 March	Watsonia Heights	1–3	Epping City	Darebin International Sports Centre
12:00 AEDT

South-East Draw

Bye	v	Kingston City FC

19 March	Bayside Argonauts	2–1	Beaumaris	Darebin International Sports Centre
18:00 AEDT

19 March	Brighton	1–2	East Bentleigh	Darebin International Sports Centre
15:00 AEDT

20 March	Caulfield Cobras	2 – 2 (a.e.t.) (5–4 p)	North Caulfield
18:00 AEDT

Southern Draw

19 March	Peninsula Strikers	6–0	Old Haileybury	Centenary Park
12:00 AEDT

19 March	Dandenong Warriors	2–7	Mornington	Dallas Brooks Park
15:00 AEDT

Bye	v	Frankston Pines

19 March	South Springvale	3–1	Berwick City	Warner Reserve
15:00 AEDT

19 March	Noble Park United	4–1	Harrisfield Hurricanes	White Eagles Stadium
17:00 AEDT

19 March	Dandenong City SC	3–1	Heatherton United	Frank Holohan Soccer Reserve
15:00 AEDT

19 March	Hampton Park United Sparrows	3–5	Seaford United	KM Reedy Reserve
15:00 AEDT

20 March	Keysborough	0–2	Springvale City	Lemnian Community Centre
14:00 AEDT

Wimmera South Coast Draw

Bye	v	Forrest Rangers

Bye	v	Ballarat District SC

19 March	Bell Park	0–3	Ballarat Red Devils	Bell Park Sports Club
15:00 AEDT

Surf Coast	v	Bye

Bye	v	Springdale

19 March	Geelong	4–0	Breakwater Eagles	White Eagle House
15:00 AEDT

Bye	v	Corio

19 March	Lovely Banks Lions	2–1	Warrnambool Wolves	Monastery Road
15:00 AEDT

Western Draw

19 March	Western Eagles	0–3	Werribee City	Polish Sports & Recreation Centre
15:00 AEDT

19 March	Keilor Park SC	1 – 1 (a.e.t.) (8–7 p)	Altona City SC	Keilor Park Reserve
3:00PM

19 March	Westgate FC	6–1	Brimbank Stallions	Ardeer Reserve
15:00 AEDT

North Sunshine Eagles	v	Bye

19 March	Westvale	2–3	Hoppers Crossing	McKechnie Reserve
15:00 AEDT

19 March	Melton	0–2	Altona North	MacPhersons Park
15:00 AEDT

19 March	Laverton Park	1–8	Altona East Phoenix	Paisley Park Soccer Complex
15:00 AEDT

19 March	Williamstown	2–0	Cairnlea	JT Gray Reserve
15:00 AEDT

== Second round Playoffs ==
26 March	Peninsula Strikers	5–0	Frankston Pines	Centenary Park
12:00 AEDT

26 March	Middle Park FC	4–1	Albert Park	DISC – Pitch 1
19:00 AEDT

26 March	Collingwood City	2–3	Yarraville Glory	McIvor Reserve
15:00 AEDT

26 March	South Yarra	v	Bye
15:00 AEDT

26 March	Old Melburnians	3–1	Maribyrnong Greens	DISC – Pitch 2
18:00 AEDT

26 March	Mooroolbark	4–2	Monash University	Dorset Recreational Reserve
17:00 AEDT

26 March	Waverley Wanderers	2–0	Monbulk Rangers	Lemnian Community Centre
15:00 AEDT

26 March	Ashburton	v	Bye
15:00 AEDT

26 March	Riversdale	0–1	Box Hill United Pythagoras SC	Lemnian Community Centre
13:00 AEDT

26 March	Whitehorse Utd	0–2	Scotch Old Boys	Terrara Park
15:00 AEDT

26 March	Nunawading City FC	1–2	Doncaster Rovers	Geaorge Andrews Reserve
13:00 AEDT

26 March	Fawkner	1 – 3 (a.e.t.)	Moreland Wolves	CB Smith Reserve
15:00 AEDT

26 March	Brunswick City	1–2	Moreland City	Dunstan Reserve
15:00 AEDT

26 March	Melbourne Tornado	2–1	Essendon Royals	Knights Stadium
15:00 AEDT

26 March	Hume Utd	3–0	FC Strathmore	Churchill Reserve
15:00 AEDT

26 March	Plenty Valley Lions	0–1	Epping City	BT Connor Reserve
15:00 AEDT

26 March	Banyule City	3–1	Northern Falcons	Yallambie Park Reserve
15:00 AEDT

26 March	Bye	v	La Trobe University
15:00 AEDT

26 March	Heidelberg Stars	4–1	Bundoora Utd	Cartledge Reserve
16:00 AEDT

26 March	Bayside Argonauts	8–0	East Bentleigh	George Andrews Reserve
15:00 AEDT

26 March	Caulfield Cobras	0–1	Kingston City	Jack Edwards Reserve
14:00 AEDT

26 March	Seaford Utd	2–4	Mornington	North Seaford Reserve
12:00 AEDT

26 March	South Springvale	2–1	Noble Park Utd	Warner Reserve
15:00 AEDT

26 March	Dandenong City	1 – 1 (a.e.t.) (4–2 p)	Springvale City	Frank Holohan Soccer Reserve
15:00 AEDT

26 March	Bye	v	Forest Rangers
15:00 AEDT

26 March	Geelong	6–1	Springdale Football Club	Stead Park Reserve
15:00 AEDT

26 March	Ballarat Red Devils	2–0	Surf Coast	Trekardo Park
15:00 AEDT

26 March	Lovely Banks Lions FC	1–6	Corio	Monastery Road
15:00 AEDT

26 March	Williamstown	1–0	Altona East Phoenix	JT Gray Reserve
15:00 AEDT

26 March	Westgate	2–1	Hoppers Crossing	Ardeer Reserve
15:00 AEDT

26 March	North Sunshine Eagles	2–0	Altona North	Larissa Reserve
15:00 AEDT

26 March	Keilor Park	3–2	Werribee City	Keilor Park Reserve
15:00 AEDT

27 March	Cobram Victory	0–8	Tatura	Barooga Recreation Reserve
15:00 AEDT

Result voided and match awarded to Cobram Victory 3–0 as Tatura fielded an ineligible player

30 March	Shepparton	3–4	Twin City Wanderers	Rumbalara Oval
19:30 AEDT

== Third round Playoffs ==
5 April	Forest Rangers	1–9	Geelong	Stead Park Reserve
19:30 AEDT

5 April	Scotch Old Boys	1 – 1 (a.e.t.) (2–4 p)	Box Hill United Pythagoras SC	Wembley Park
20:00 AEDT

6 April	North Sunshine Eagles	1–0	Williamstown	George Andrews Reserve
20:00 AEDT	Fitim Ferzulla

6 April	South Springvale	3–1	Peninsula Strikers	The Grange Reserve
20:00 AEDT

7 April	Moreland Wolves	1–4	Hume Utd	DISC – Pitch 3
19:30 AEDT

11 April	Moreland City	2–0	Melbourne Tornado	DISC – Pitch 2
19:00 AEDT

12 April	Doncaster Rovers	2–1	Ashburton	Anderson Park
19:30 AEDT

13 April	Heidelberg Stars	2–0	La Trobe University	DISC – Pitch 3
19:00 AEDT

13 April	Mornington	1–3	Dandenong City	Monterey Reserve
19:30 AEDT

14 April	Epping City	1–3	Banyule City	DISC – Pitch 1
19:30 AEDT

18 April	Yarraville Glory	2–0	Old Melburnians	DISC – Pitch 1
19:30 AEDT

19 April	Corio	1–2	Ballarat Red Devils	Morshead Park
19:00 AEDT

27 April	Keilor Park	2–1	Westgate	Ardeer Reserve
19:30 AEDT	Michael Mazzarino 75'; Steven Mussel 80'	Report	Unrecorded

21 April	South Yarra	1–0	Middle Park FC	DISC – Pitch 1
19:30 AEDT

== Zone Semi-finals ==
The draw for the Zone Semi-finals took place on 14 April 2011. This round saw the introduction of the Alanic Victorian Premier League teams, with the exception of Richmond SC, and Victorian State League 1 teams. These 23 (seeded) teams were paired off with 23 of the 25 (unseeded) teams who progressed through the Zone Playoffs stage, with Malvern City and Fortuna 60 SC playing each other in the 24th match. This stage contained 48 teams in total. Green Gully Cavaliers set the record for most goals in a match, in the short history of the competition. The side comprehensively beat Regional side Mildura United SC 18 – 0 after leading 9 – 0 at the half.

21 April	Pascoe Vale (S1)	3–0	Mooroolbark SC (P1)	SS Anderson Reserve
19:45 AEDT

21 April	Geelong SC (S2)	0–1	St Albans Saints (VPL)	Stead Park Reserve
20:00 AEDT

23 April	Moreland City (S2)	3–2	Fawkner Blues (S1)	Campbell Reserve
14:00 AEDT

23 April	Green Gully Cavaliers (VPL)	18–0	Mildura United SC (R)	Green Gully Reserve
15:30 AEDT

26 April	Hume City (VPL)	2–1	Hume United (S3)	Broadmeadows Valley Park
14:00 AEDT

26 April	Langwarrin SC (S1)	0–1	Dandenong City Soccer Club (S2)	Lawton Park Reserve
14:00 AEDT

26 April	Bayside Argonauts (P2)	0–4	Bentleigh Greens (VPL)	Kingston Heath Soccer Complex
14:00 AEDT

26 April	FC Clifton Hill (S2)	5–2	Twin City Wanderers (R)	Kevin Bartlett Reserve
14:00 AEDT

26 April	Ballarat Red Devils (S2)	1–0	North Geelong Warriors (S1)	Trekardo Park
14:00 AEDT	Luke Armstrong 109'	Report

26 April	Sunshine George Cross(S1)	0–11	Strathdale SC (R)	Epsom Huntly Recreation Reserve
14:00 AEDT

26 April	South Melbourne (VPL)	14–0	Yarraville Glory (S3)	John Cain Memorial Park
15:00 AEDT

27 April	Altona Magic (S1)	1–2	North Sunshine Eagles (P1)	Paisley Park Soccer Complex
19:00 AEDT

27 April	Dandenong Thunder (VPL)	2–0	South Springvale (S2)	George Andrews Reserve
19:30 AEDT

27 April	Waverley Wanderers (S3)	2–5	Oakleigh Cannons (VPL)	Jack Edwards Reserve
19:30 AEDT

3 May	Kingston City (S3)	1–5	Southern Stars (S1)	The Grange Reserve
19:30 AEDT

3 May	South Yarra (P1)	0–6	Port Melbourne Sharks (S1)	SS Anderson Reserve
19:30 AEDT		Report

3 May	Melbourne Knights (VPL)	6–2	Keilor Park SC (S3)	Knights Stadium
19:30 AEDT		Report

3 May	Heidelberg Stars FC (P3)	1–7	Preston Lions (S1)	DISC – Pitch 1
19:30 AEDT		Report

3 May	Northcote City SC (VPL)	2–1	Box Hill United (S2)	Wembley Park
19:45 AEDT		Report

4 May	Heidelberg United FC (VPL)	4–2	Banyule City (S2)	Olympic Park (Village)
19:30 AEDT

4 May	Falcons 2000 (R)	0–8	Springvale White Eagles (VPL)	Latrobe City Sports Club
20:00 AEDT

10 May	Doncaster Rovers SC (S2)	0 – 0 (a.e.t.) (2–4 p)	Bulleen Lions (S1)	Anderson Park
19:30 AEDT

15 May	Cobram Victory (R)	3–2	Whittlesea Zebras (S1)	Barooga Recreation Reserve
15:00 AEDT

17 May	Malvern City (S2)	7–2	Fortuna 60 SC (R)	Jack Edwards Reserve
20:30 AEDT

== Zone Finals ==
The lowest ranked team left in the competition is North Sunshine Eagles of the Victorian Men's Provisional League 1 (North-West), the fifth tier of Victorian state football. All 11 VPL clubs in the tournament survived their first round matches.

31 May	Melbourne Knights (VPL)	3–1	North Sunshine Eagles (P1)	Knights Stadium
19:30 AEDT	3		1

1 June	Oakleigh Cannons (VPL)	1–0	Pascoe Vale (S1)	Jack Edwards Reserve
20:15 AEDT	1		0

8 June	South Melbourne (VPL)	1–2	Port Melbourne (S1)	SS Anderson Reserve
19:30 AEDT	1		2

8 June	Southern Stars (S1)	4–0	Bentleigh Greens (VPL)	The Grange Reserve
19:30 AEDT	4		0

8 June	Green Gully Cavaliers (VPL)	1–0	Sunshine George Cross (S1)	Green Gully Reserve
19:30 AEDT	1		0

9 June	FC Bulleen Lions (S1)	0–4	Northcote City (VPL)	Veneto Social Club
19:30 AEDT	0		4

9 June	Dandenong City (S2)	0–2	Dandenong Thunder (VPL)	George Andrews Reserve
19:30 AEDT	0		2

10 June	Springvale White Eagles (VPL)	1–0	Malvern City (S2)	White Eagles Stadium
20:00 AEDT

11 June	Hume City (VPL)	2–1	Moreland City (S2)	Broadmeadows Valley Park
13:00 AEDT

11 June	FC Clifton Hill (S2)	0–2	Cobram Victory (R)	Kevin Bartlett Reserve
15:00 AEDT

12 June	Preston (S1)	2–4	Heidelberg United (VPL)	B.T. Connor Reserve
15:00 AEDT

9 July	Ballarat Red Devils (S2)	3–1	St Albans Saints (VPL)	Trekardo Park
13:00 AEDT

== Super 12 ==
The draw for the Super 12 round was held on 17 June 2011. 8 of the 11 VPL clubs survived their second round matches. The lowest ranked club remaining in the tournament is Cobram Victory, from the regional Goulburn North East Football Association.

13 July	Northcote City (VPL)	2–1	Port Melbourne (S1)	SS Anderson Reserve
19:30 AEST	Trifiro 38'; Piemonte 45+1'	Report	Tsiorlas 90'

20 July	Ballarat Red Devils (S2)	1–2	Hume City (VPL)	Morshead Park
19:00 AEST	Tinker 22'	Report	Cardozo 46', 82'

13 July	Southern Stars (S1)	0–2	Oakleigh Cannons (VPL)	George Andrews Reserve
19:30 AEST		Report	Hatzimouratis 53'; Lagana 72'

27 July	Melbourne Knights (VPL)	2–1	Cobram Victory (R)	Knights Stadium
20:00 AEST	Gray 83'		Vincent 35', 70'

12 July	Heidelberg United (VPL)	0–3	Green Gully Cavaliers (VPL)	Olympic Park (Village)
19:30 AEST		Report	Papadopoulos 79'; Medjedovic 81'; Drake 87'

5 July	Dandenong Thunder (VPL)	0–2	Springvale White Eagles (VPL)	George Andrews Reserve
19:30 AEST		Report	D'Angelo 57'; Zoric 72'

== Quarter-final Series ==
After the removal of Melbourne Heart and Melbourne Victory, who were set to debut in the Quarter-finals, the structure of the tournament was revised. Instead of a straight knockout – as was previously planned – the six teams will be placed into two round-robin tournament groups of three, with the top two teams from each group to advance to the Semi-finals. The draw for this stage, as well as the announcement of the format, was held on 22 July.

Key to colours in group tables
Teams that qualified for Semi-finals
Teams eliminated from competition

=== Pool A ===
Team	Pld	W	D	L	GF	GA	GD	Pts
Northcote City	1	1	0	0	4	1	+3	3
Oakleigh Cannons	1	1	0	0	3	1	+2	3
Springvale White Eagles	2	0	0	2	2	7	−5	0

Northcote City	Cancelled	Oakleigh Cannons
	Match was abandoned after the previous results; this match could not affect the standings.

10 August	Oakleigh Cannons	3–1	Springvale White Eagles	Jack Edwards Reserve
19:00 AEST	Groenewald 33'; Diaco 68'; Ragusa 87'	Report	Cahuzu 17'

21 August	Springvale White Eagles	1–4	Northcote City	Serbian Sports Centre
14:00 AEST	Camuzcu 18'	Report	Rixon 12', 43'; Piemonte 15'; Trifiro 68'

=== Pool B ===
Team	Pld	W	D	L	GF	GA	GD	Pts
Melbourne Knights	2	1	1	0	1	0	+1	4
Green Gully Cavaliers	2	1	0	1	1	1	0	3
Hume City	2	0	1	1	0	1	−1	1

2 August	Green Gully Cavaliers	1–0	Hume City	Green Gully Reserve
19:00 AEST	Medjedovic 65'	Report

10 August	Hume City	0–0	Melbourne Knights	Knights Stadium
19:00 AEST		Report

17 August	Melbourne Knights	1–0	Green Gully Cavaliers	Knights Stadium
19:00 AEST	Zezovski 2'	Report

== Semi-finals ==
7 September	Oakleigh Cannons	1–2	Melbourne Knights	Kingston Heath Soccer Complex
19:30 AEST	Lagana 26'	Report	Kozic 60'; Yusuf 63'

7 September	Northcote City	2–0	Green Gully Cavaliers	Olympic Park (Village)
19:30 AEST	Rixon 37'; McHeileh 90+4'	Report

== Regional Challenge Cup ==
10 September	Ballarat Red Devils	1–2	Cobram Victory	AAMI Park
13:00 AEST	McClounan 25'	Report	Miles 1'; Carley 35'

== Final ==
10 September
16:00 AEST

Melbourne Knights	0–2	Northcote City
	Report	Trifiro 40'; Curtis 71'

AAMI Park
