= Jamie England =

English footballer (born 1988)

Personal information
- Date of birth: 27 May 1988 (age 38)
- Place of birth: Epsom, England
- Height: 1.80 m (5 ft 11 in)
- Position: Midfielder

Team information
- Current team: Goulburn Valley Suns

Youth career
- –2006: Milton Keynes Dons

Senior career*
Years	Team	Apps	(Gls)
2006	Brentford	0	(0)
2007	Crawley Town	3	(0)
2007	→ Chelmsford City (loan)	7	(3)
2007–2008	Chelmsford City	22	(0)
2008	Wivenhoe Town	10	(3)
2008–2010	Carshalton Athletic	34	(3)
2010	Ashford Town (Middlesex)	11	(4)
2010	Billericay Town	3	(0)
2010–2011	Tonbridge Angels	7	(2)
2011	Bromley	10	(0)
2011	Croydon Athletic	13	(2)
2011–2012	Tooting & Mitcham United	10	(1)
2012–2013	Cobram Victory	25	(12)
2013–2014	Cobram	15	(7)
2015–	Goulburn Valley Suns	129	(23)
- * Club domestic league appearances and goals as of 12:29, 23 July 2024 (UTC)

Jamie England (born 27 May 1988) is an English semi-professional footballer who plays as a midfielder for Goulburn Valley Suns. He made one professional appearance for Brentford in 2006, before embarking on a nomadic career in non-League football and moving to Australia in 2012.

== Playing career ==
=== Milton Keynes Dons ===
A central midfielder, England began his career in the youth system at Wimbledon, moving with the club to Milton Keynes in 2003 (which saw the club renamed Milton Keynes Dons in 2004). He failed to receive a call into the first team squad and was released at the end of the 2005–06 season.

=== Brentford ===
England joined League One club Brentford on non-contract terms on 16 September 2006, after a successful trial. He was named on the substitutes' bench for a League Cup second round match versus Luton Town on 19 September. England made his professional debut when he came on as an 89th-minute substitute for Simon Cox during the 3–0 defeat. It was England's only first team appearance and his non-contract registration was terminated by mutual consent on 10 October.

=== Crawley Town ===
England joined Conference Premier club Crawley Town on transfer deadline day in January 2007 and signed a contract running until the end of the 2006–07 season. He made only three appearances for the club and scored no goals. He left the club during the 2007 off-season.

=== Chelmsford City ===
England joined Isthmian League Premier Division club Chelmsford City on loan in March 2007. A third-place finish saw the Clarets qualify for the playoffs, but a shootout defeat to Billericay Town in the semi-finals ensured they would remain in the Premier Division for another season. England made seven appearances and scored three goals during the remainder of the 2006–07 season. England joined the club on a permanent basis during the 2007 off-season. England made 24 appearances during the 2007–08 season and helped the team to the Premier Division title, winning the first silverware of his career in the process. He departed the club during the 2008 off-season, following a "contract wrangle".

=== Wivenhoe Town ===
England signed for Eastern Counties League Premier Division club Wivenhoe Town during the 2008 off-season. He departed the club in November 2008, after scoring three goals in 10 appearances for the Dragons.

=== Carshalton Athletic ===
England joined Isthmian League Premier Division promotion contenders Carshalton Athletic in November 2008. He made 30 appearances and scored three goals in the 2008–09 season to help the Robins to a fourth-place finish and a spot in the playoffs, but the club's season ended with a 1–0 defeat to Staines Town in the playoff final. England departed the War Memorial Sports Ground in January 2010, after making 10 appearances and scoring one goal during the first half of the 2009–10 season.

=== Ashford Town (Middlesex) ===
England signed for Isthmian League Premier Division strugglers Ashford Town (Middlesex) in January 2010. He made 11 appearances and scored four goals for the Tangerines, but his time with the club was short and he departed in March.

=== Billericay Town ===
England joined Isthmian League Premier Division club Billericay Town on 26 March 2010. He made three appearances in what remained of the 2009–10 season. He left the club in October 2010.

=== Tonbridge Angels ===
England signed for Isthmian League Premier Division promotion-challengers Tonbridge Angels in October 2010. A groin problem hindered his progress and he made 9 appearances, scoring two goals, before his departure in February 2011.

=== Bromley ===
England moved back up to the Conference South to sign for Bromley on 18 February 2011. He made 10 appearances in what remained of the 2010–11 season and departed the club during the 2011 off-season.

=== Croydon Athletic ===
England joined Isthmian League First Division South club Croydon Athletic during the 2011 off-season. England was forced to leave the club after it went out of business in December 2011. He made 14 appearances and scored two goals.

=== Tooting & Mitcham United ===
England Isthmian League Premier Division club Tooting & Mitcham United in December 2011. He made 10 appearances in what remained of the 2011–12 season.

=== Cobram Victory ===
England moved to Australia to sign for Regional Premier League club Cobram Victory for the 2012 season. He scored his first goal for the club in a 6–1 victory over Hanwood on 25 August. Two games later he crowned his season by scoring in the 5–0 Regional Premier League Grand Final victory over Shepparton. England made 11 league appearances and scored two goals during the 2012 season. England was selected to represent a Goulburn North East Football Association All-Star XI in a match versus A-League club Melbourne Heart on 25 July 2013. England's season ended with a third-place finish and the Best-And-Fairest and Players' Player Of The Year Awards. He scored 10 goals in 14 league games during the 2013 season and departed the club in November 2013.

=== Cobram ===
England signed for Regional Premier League club Cobram on 8 November 2013. He scored seven goals in 15 games during the 2014 season, as Cobram managed a third-place finish.

=== Goulburn Valley Suns ===
England joined National Premier Leagues Victoria 1 Western Conference club Goulburn Valley Suns prior to the beginning of the 2015 season. He made 97 appearances and scored 19 goals between 2015 and 2018.

== Career statistics ==
As of match played 19 August 2023

Appearances and goals by club, season and competition
Club	Season	League			National cup (Note: Includes FA Cup, Australia Cup)		League cup (Note: Includes Football League Cup)		Other		Total	
Club	Season	Division	Apps	Goals	Apps	Goals	Apps	Goals	Apps	Goals	Apps	Goals
Brentford	2006–07	League One	0	0	—		1	0	—		1	0
Crawley Town	2006–07	Conference Premier	3	0	—		—		—		3	0
Chelmsford City (loan)	2006–07	Isthmian League Premier Division	6	2	—		—		1 (Note: 1 appearance in Isthmian League Premier Division play-offs)	1	7	3
Chelmsford City	2007–08	Isthmian League Premier Division	22	0	0	0	—		2 (Note: Appearances in Isthmian League Cup)	0	24	0
Chelmsford City	Total		28	2	0	0	—		3	1	31	3
Wivenhoe Town	2008–09	Eastern Counties League Premier Division	10	3	0	0	—		—		10	3
Carshalton Athletic	2008–09	Isthmian League Premier Division	25	3	0	0	—		5 (Note: 3 appearances in Isthmian League Cup, 2 appearances in Isthmian League Premier Division play-offs)	0	30	3
Carshalton Athletic	2009–10	Isthmian League Premier Division	9	1	1	0	—		—		10	1
Carshalton Athletic	Total		34	4	1	0	—		5	0	40	4
Ashford Town (Middlesex)	2009–10	Isthmian League Premier Division	11	4	—		—		—		11	4
Billericay Town	2009–10	Isthmian League Premier Division	3	0	—		—		—		3	0
Tonbridge Angels	2010–11	Isthmian League Premier Division	7	2	0	0	—		2 (Note: 2 appearances in FA Trophy, 1 appearance in Isthmian League Cup)	0	9	2
Bromley	2010–11	Conference South	10	0	—		—		—		10	0
Tooting & Mitcham United	2011–12	Isthmian League Premier Division	10	1	—		—		—		10	1
Cobram Victory	2012	Regional Premier League	11	2	—		—		—		11	2
Cobram Victory	2013	Regional Premier League	14	10	—		—		—		14	10
Cobram Victory	Total		25	12	—		—		—		25	12
Cobram	2014	Regional Premier League	15	7	—		—		—		15	7
Goulburn Valley Suns	2015	National Premier Leagues Victoria 1 East	17	1	2	0	—		—		19	1
Goulburn Valley Suns	2016	National Premier Leagues Victoria 2 East	17	1	—		—		—		17	1
Goulburn Valley Suns	2017	National Premier Leagues Victoria 2 East	26	7	1	0	—		—		27	7
Goulburn Valley Suns	2018	National Premier Leagues Victoria 2 East	16	6	—		—		—		16	6
Goulburn Valley Suns	2019	National Premier Leagues Victoria 2 East	24	5	1	0	—		—		25	5
Goulburn Valley Suns	2021	National Premier Leagues Victoria 2 East	5	0	3	1	—		—		8	1
Goulburn Valley Suns	2022	National Premier Leagues Victoria 2 East	8	1	0	0	—		—		8	1
Goulburn Valley Suns	2023	National Premier Leagues Victoria 3 East	13	2	0	0	—		—		13	2
Goulburn Valley Suns	2024	Victoria Premier League 2	3	0	—		—		—		3	0
Goulburn Valley Suns	Total		129	23	7	1	—		—		136	24
Career total			281	58	8	1	1	0	10	1	304	60

== Honours ==
Chelmsford City

- Isthmian League Premier Division: 2007–08

Cobram Victory

- Regional Premier League: 2012

Individual

- Cobram Victory Best-And-Fairest Player: 2013
- Cobram Victory Players' Player Of The Year: 2013
