= Jordi Valadon =

Australian soccer player

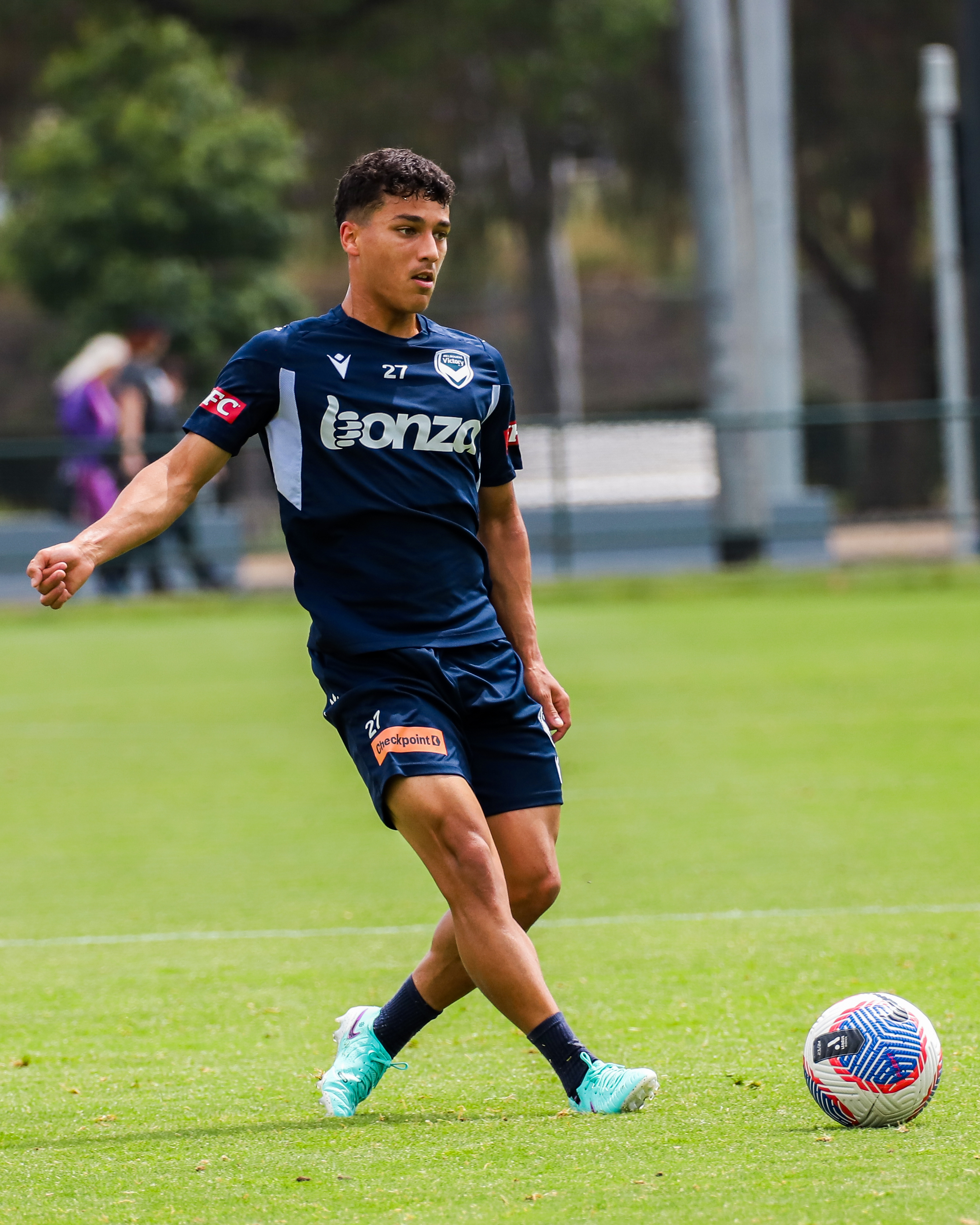
- Jordi Valadon training for Melbourne Victory, November 2023

Personal information
- Full name: Jordi Francis Valadon
- Date of birth: 4 March 2003 (age 23)
- Height: 1.74 m (5 ft 8 1/2 in)
- Position: Defensive midfielder

Team information
- Current team: Melbourne Victory
- Number: 8

Youth career
- Glen Eira FC
- Box Hill United
- Melbourne City

Senior career*
Years	Team	Apps	(Gls)
2019–2022	Melbourne City NPL	46	(7)
2022–2023	Melbourne City	0	(0)
2023–2024	Melbourne Victory NPL	16	(5)
2023–	Melbourne Victory	71	(1)

International career^{‡}
2024–	Australia U23	9	(0)
Medal record
Men's football
Representing Australia
WAFF U-23 Championship
Runner-up	2024 Saudi Arabia
- * Club domestic league appearances and goals as of 28 March 2026 ‡ National team caps and goals as of 7 September 2025

Jordi Francis Valadon (French: [ʒɔʁdi fʁɑ̃.sis valadɔ̃]; born 4 March 2003) is an Australian professional soccer player who plays as a defensive midfielder for A-League Men club Melbourne Victory.

== Early life ==
Raised in Melbourne, Victoria, Valadon played youth football for Box Hill United and Melbourne City. He attended Mazenod College, located in Mulgrave, where he also played and captained the school football team. Valadon grew up supporting Melbourne Victory.

== Club career ==
=== Melbourne City ===
After playing regularly in the academy, Valadon was registered into the National Premier Leagues and A-League Youth squads for Melbourne City Youth. He finished with three goals and three assists for City in the 2022 National Premier Leagues Victoria 3 as his side achieved automatic promotion.

Having registered an A-League bench appearance earlier on 29 January 2022, Valadon made his professional debut in an AFC Champions League group clash against BG Pathum United on 15 April. City contested a 1–1 draw at full-time in their first Champions League match of their history.

=== Melbourne Victory ===
Valadon joined Melbourne Victory early-2023 after holding discussions with Victory youth coach Joe Palatsides. He made his first-team debut as a substitute in a 2–1 victory over Macarthur FC, and then his starting debut six days later in a 1–0 defeat to Brisbane Roar on 29 April. Following the conclusion of the 2022–23 season, Valadon signed his first professional contract – a two-year scholarship deal – with Victory on 5 July. However, on 7 August, Valadon was ruled out with a hamstring injury from training and was expected to receive surgery on the following Thursday.

Valadon played 15 matches during the 2023–24 A-League Men season and started Melbourne Victory's grand final against Central Coast Mariners. The match ended in a 3-1 defeat for Melbourne Victory.

On 18 February 2025, Melbourne Victory announced Valadon’s contract extension until the end of the 2026/27 season.

== Honours ==
Melbourne Victory

- A-League Men Championship Finalist: 2023–24, 2024–25
- Australia Cup Finalist: 2024

Melbourne Victory NPL

- National Premier Leagues Victoria 3 Finalist: 2023
- National Premier Leagues Victoria 2 Champions: 2024

Melbourne City NPL

- National Premier Leagues Victoria 3 Finalist: 2022

Australia U-23

- WAFF U-23 Championship: runner-up 2024
