= Valadon (disambiguation) =

Valadon may refer to:

- Suzanne Valadon (1865–1938), French painter
- Jordi Valadon (born 2003), Australian footballer
- Maurice Utrillo (1883–1955), born Maurice Valadon, Suzanne Valadon's son and fellow painter
- Rosemary Valadon (born 1947), Australian painter, winner of the Archibald Prize and other awards
- Paul Valadon (1867–1913), German-born magician, one-time assistant of John Nevil Maskelyne
- Gabrielle Valadon, a main character in the film The Private Life of Sherlock Holmes
- 6937 Valadon, an asteroid named after Suzanne Valadon
- Valadon (crater), a crater on Venus named after Suzanne Valadon (see list of craters on Venus)
