= 2022 National Premier Leagues Victoria 3 =

2nd season of the National Premier Leagues Victoria 3

NPL Victoria 3
- Season: 2022
- Dates: 19 March – 20 August 2022
- Champions: Preston Lions
- Promoted: Preston Lions; Melbourne City Youth; Western United Youth
- Relegated: Whittlesesa Ranges; Springvale White Eagles
- Matches: 132
- Goals: 441 (3.34 per match)
- Top goalscorer: Archibald Macphee (14); Connor Bell
- Biggest home win: Melbourne Victory Youth 6-0; Ballarat City (7 May 2022)
- Biggest away win: Ballarat City 0-5; Melbourne City Youth (25 June 2022)
- All statistics correct as of 11 August 2024.

The 2022 National Premier Leagues Victoria 3 was the second season of the National Premier Leagues Victoria 3, the third-tier competition in Victorian football. The season was won by Preston Lions, who along with Melbourne City Youth and Western United Youth, were promoted to NPL Victoria 2. Whittlesesa Ranges and Springvale White Eagles were relegated to Victorian State League Division 1.

== Teams ==
Twelve teams will compete in the league; eight teams who were relegated from the NPL 2 in 2019 and four teams who were promoted from the State League 1 in the same season.

=== Stadiums and locations ===
Note: Table lists in alphabetical order.

Team	Location	Stadium	Capacity
Ballarat City	Ballarat (Redan)	Morshead Park	8,500
Box Hill United	Melbourne (Box Hill)	Wembley Park	2,500
Doveton	Melbourne (Eumemmerring)	Waratah Reserve	1,000
Geelong	Geelong (Norlane)	Stead Park	1,000
Melbourne City Youth	Melbourne (Bundoora)	Parade College	2,000
Melbourne Victory Youth	Melbourne (Epping)	Epping Stadium	10,000
North Sunshine Eagles	Melbourne (St Albans)	Larissa Reserve	1,000
Nunwading City	Melbourne (Forest Hill)	Mahoneys Reserve	1,000
Preston Lions	Melbourne (Reservoir)	B.T. Connor Reserve	8,000
Springvale White Eagles	Melbourne (Keysborough)	Serbian Sports Centre	5,000
Western United Youth	Melbourne (Fraser Rise)	City Vista Recreation Reserve	5,000
Whittlesesa Ranges	Melbourne (Epping)	Epping Stadium	10,000

== League table ==
Pos	Team	Pld	W	D	L	GF	GA	GD	Pts	Promotion, qualification or relegation
1	Preston Lions (C, P)	22	16	4	2	43	13	+30	52	Promotion to the NPL Victoria 2
2	Melbourne City Youth (P)	22	15	4	3	57	22	+35	49	Promotion to the NPL Victoria 2
3	Western United Youth (O, P)	22	12	3	7	44	32	+12	39	Qualification for NPL Victoria 2 play-offs
4	Melbourne Victory Youth	22	11	5	6	38	27	+11	38	Qualification for NPL Victoria 2 play-offs
5	Nunawading City	22	11	3	8	34	27	+7	36	
6	North Sunshine Eagles	22	9	3	10	39	37	+2	30	
7	Doveton SC	22	7	8	7	32	30	+2	29	
8	Geelong SC	22	8	3	11	28	38	−10	27	
9	Box Hill United	22	6	7	9	34	36	−2	25	
10	Ballarat City	22	5	4	13	31	61	−30	19	
11	Springvale White Eagles (R)	22	6	1	15	35	60	−25	19	Relegation to Victorian State League Division 1
12	Whittlesea Ranges (R)	22	1	5	16	26	58	−32	8	Relegation to Victorian State League Division 1

Source: sportstg.com
Rules for classification: 1) Points; 2) Goal difference; 3) Goals scored
(C) Champions; (O) Play-off winners; (P) Promoted; (R) Relegated

== Results ==
=== Regular season ===
The fixtures for the season were released on 21 December 2021.

Home \ Away	BAL	BOX	DOV	GEE	MCY	MVC	NOR	NUN	PRE	SPR	WES	WHI
Ballarat City	—											
Box Hill United		—										
Doveton SC			—									
Geelong SC				—								
Melbourne City Youth					—							
Melbourne Victory Youth						—						
North Sunshine Eagles							—					
Nunawading City								—				
Preston Lions									—			
Springvale White Eagles										—		
Western United Youth											—	
Whittlesea Ranges												—

Updated to match(es) played on 27 December 2021. Source: GameDay
Legend: Blue = home team win; Yellow = draw; Red = away team win.

=== Promotional play-offs ===
In the 2022 season, the bottom two teams in the NPL Victoria 2 and the 3rd to 4th placed teams in NPL Victoria 3 played in a play-off competition where 2 games would be played and the winners would play in NPL Victoria 2 in the 2023 season, while the loser would play in the NPL Victoria 3 for the 2023 season. The matches were played between 27th & 28th August at Hume City Stadium. Western United Youth defeated Goulburn Valley Suns 6−1 to gain promotion. Melbourne Victory Youth were not so lucky after losing 1−0 to Kingston City.

27 August 2022
14:00 AEST (UTC+10:00)

Goulburn Valley Suns	1−6	Western United Youth
Balaburov	Report	Holmes; Najdovski; Botic; Theoharous; Duzel

Hume City Stadium, Broadmeadows
Referee: Ross Clark

28 August 2022
14:00 AEST (UTC+10:00)

Kingston City	1−0	Melbourne Victory Youth
Sakhizada	Report

Hume City Stadium, Broadmeadows
Referee: Michael Mammis

== Season statistics ==
=== Top scorers ===
Rank	Player	Club	Goals
1	Archibald Macphee	Nunawading City	14
1	Connor Bell	Preston Lions	14
3	Michael Trigger	Ballarat City	13
4	Arion Sulemani	Melbourne City	12
4	Nashir Hussainy	Springvale White Eagles	12

=== Discipline ===
==== Yellow cards ====
Rank	Player	Club	Yellow cards
1	Andrija Kecojevic	Springvale White Eagles	10
2	Benjamin Lyvidikos	Preston Lions	9
2	Felix Dimitrakis	Nunwading City	9
2	Jakub Mlcak	North Sunshine Eagles	9
2	James Haran	Preston Lions	9
2	Ryan Stewart	North Sunshine Eagles	9

==== Red cards ====
Rank	Player	Club	Red cards
1	Ibrahima Soumah	Whittlesesa Ranges	2
1	Marko Bulic	Melbourne Victory Youth	2
1	Peter Koskos	Whittlesesa Ranges	2
1	Ryan Stewart	North Sunshine Eagles	2
