= Melbourne Victory FC Youth =

Melbourne Victory Youth
- Full name: Melbourne Victory Football Club Youth
- Nicknames: Victory, Victory NYL, Victory Youth
- Short name: MVC
- Founded: 2008; 18 years ago
- Ground: The Home of the Matildas
- Capacity: 3,000
- Chairman: John Dovaston
- Manager: Besart Berisha
- League: Victoria Premier League 1 A-League Youth
- 2026: 3rd of 14
- Website: http://www.melbournevictory.com.au
Home colours	Away colours

Melbourne Victory Football Club Youth is the youth system of Melbourne Victory based in Melbourne, Victoria. The team plays in the Victoria Premier League 1, the third level of the Australian soccer league system.

== History ==
=== Beginnings of the youth team (2008–2014) ===
The youth team was founded in 2008, as a Melbourne Victory representative team for the inaugural season of the National Youth League competition, along with six other youth squads, and finished a disappointing sixth. The development side has had three managers, Mehmet Durakovic, who was promoted to manager of the senior squad in 2011, and current managers Darren Davies and John Aloisi. Davies led the youth side to its first silverware victory in winning the premiership plate, finishing first on the National Youth League ladder in the 2012–13 season. It would be current club chairman Anthony Di Pietro's first silverware victory as well. On 7 November 2014, it was confirmed that the team would compete in the National Premier Leagues Victoria 1 competition for 2015 season onwards.

=== Victorian League systems (2015–2019) ===
Victory managed promotion at their first attempt, placing second in the NPL1 East division, going on to beat Moreland Zebras FC in the qualification playoff and then North Geelong Warriors FC in the promotion playoff. For the club's first season in the top tier of football in Victorian state football, Matt Hennessey and Ryan Lambert were signed from Hume City FC and Richmond SC respectively. unfortunately Victory would finnish last place in their first time in the NPL Victoria. this would lead to its relegation back down to NPL Victoria 2, now in the western division of NPL Victoria division 2. Victory would stay in NPL Victoria 2 for the next two years avoiding relegation before placing ninth place in 2019 relegating them to NPL Victoria 3.

=== Post COVID years (2020–present) ===
Melbourne Victory wouldn't get to play NPL Victoria 3 football in 2020 or 2021 due to the COVID-19 pandemic. Melbourne Victory would finally compete in NPL Victoria 3 in 2022, where Victory would finnish fourth place and qualifying them a promotional play-off. Victory would play Kingston City on 28 August 2022 where they would fall short after Faisal Sakhizada scored a lone goal for Kingston meaning Victory would compete in the NPL Victoria 3 for another year. In 2023 Victory would place second in NPL Victoria 3 leading to the promotion of the club into the re-branded Victoria Premier League 1. In 2024 Victory would be promoted in back-to-back years as well as becoming Champions of the Victoria Premier League 1. Victory would be promoted into NPL Victoria. the top tier of Victorian Football. This was the first time Victory competed in the top tier of Victorian Football since 2016. Victory would enter the 2025 NPL Victoria season hoping to stay up. Victory would fight strong throughout the season with many instances where Victory would concede goals in the final minutes of the game, leading to Victory losing points throughout the season. One particular example of this was in February in a match against South Melbourne, when Victory had a goal lead in the 90+4th minute with only a minute left. In the 90+5th minute Victory would concede a goal to make the score 3–3 in a match that could've been major importance in Victory's Survival fight. Unfortunately Victory would finish 12th place leading to the club's relegation back down to the Victoria Premier League 1.

== Stadiums ==
The team play their home matches at The Home of the Matildas in Melbourne's northern suburb of Bundoora. The stadium has a total capacity of 3,000, with a single grandstand of approximately 800 seats. Past venues used as a home ground by the club have been South Melbourne FC home ground Lakeside Stadium in Albert Park, Bentleigh Greens' Kingston Heath in Cheltenham, Northcote City's John Cain Memorial Park in Thornbury and Whittlesea Ranges' Epping Stadium in Epping. The team has also played competitive matches at Victory's senior team home venues, AAMI Park and Etihad Stadium.

== Current squad ==
As of 12 February 2026

Note: Flags indicate national team as defined under FIFA eligibility rules; some limited exceptions apply. Players may hold more than one non-FIFA nationality.

No.	Pos.	Nation	Player
—	FW	AUS	Ali Abili
—	FW	AUS	Edon Ajrovski
—		AUS	Wisam Adams
—	DF	AUS	Matias Aloisi
—	DF	AUS	Winston Ashburner
—	GK	AUS	Maxim Atkinson
—		AUS	James Batzias
—		AUS	Raphael Caliguri
—	FW	AUS	James Carocci
—	DF	AUS	Oliver Dimovski
—	MF	AUS	Ethan Gemetzis
—	FW	AUS	Mikey Ghossaini
—		AUS	Alex Gouvoussis
—		AUS	Anton Gray
—	FW	PAK	Ahmed Faraz Gulzari
—	FW	AUS	Jordan Hoey
—	MF	PAK	Zain Imran
—		AUS	Thomas Jackson
—	DF	AUS	William Kengni
—	DF	AUS	Liam Lancaster

No.	Pos.	Nation	Player
—	FW	AUS	Alex Lee
—		AUS	Theodore Limberis
—	FW	AUS	Lewis Marinucci
—	MF	AUS	Jack Mihailidis
—		AUS	Max Mihailidis
—		AUS	Josh Musso
—	MF	AUS	Cian O’Flynn
—	FW	AUS	Malik Olukhale
—	DF	AUS	John Radimisis
—	FW	AUS	James Rashio
—	FW	AUS	Mush Sawiz
—	MF	NZL	Keigo Shimokawa
—	MF	AUS	Yianni Spyropoulos
—	DF	AUS	Zane Stevenson
—		AUS	Anthony Suleman
—	MF	AUS	Noah Tanfara
—	GK	AUS	Luca Thomas
—		AUS	George Tsianakas
—	GK	AUS	Oskar Von Schrenk
—		AUS	Orrey Xia

== Current staff ==
Besart Berisha	1st Grade Head Coach

== Honours ==
La Ionica Community Cup

Winners (1): 2015

Victoria Premier Leagues 1 Premiership

Champion (1): 2024

National Premier Leagues Victoria 2 Premiership

Runners-up (1): 2015

National Premier Leagues Victoria 3 Premiership

Runners-up (1): 2023

Y-League Premiership

  - Premiers (1): 2012–13

== Former players ==
This is a list of former Melbourne Victory Youth players, who have played at least 20 A-League competitive matches for the first team.

As of 3 June 2025

Name	Nationality	Position	Melbourne career	Appearances	Goals
Nick Ansell	Australia	Defender	2011–17, 2018–19, 2020–21	92	1
Thomas Deng	Australia	Defender	2015–2020	71	2
Mate Dugandzic	Australia	Forward	2009–11	36	7
Diogo Ferreira	Australia	Midfielder	2010–13	52	2
Matthew Foschini	Australia	Defender	2009–13	53	0
Petar Franjic	Australia	Defender	2010–13	31	0
Scott Galloway	Australia	Defender	2013–16	54	1
Jason Geria	Australia	Defender	2012–18, 2021–2025	189	4
James Jeggo	Australia	Midfielder	2011–14	30	2
Mitchell Langerak	Australia	Goalkeeper	2007–10	21	0
Dylan Murnane	Australia	Defender	2013–16	24	0
Andrew Nabbout	Australia	Forward	2012–15	37	5
Sebastian Ryall	Australia	Defender	2007–09	24	0
Connor Pain	Australia	Forward	2013–16	53	3
Stefan Nigro	Australia	Midfielder	2015–18, 2021–2024	69	0
Lleyton Brooks	Australia	Midfielder	2020–2023	31	3
**Nishan Velupillay**	Australia	Forward	2021–	106	15
**Kasey Bos**	Australia	Defender	2023–	28	4

- **Bold** denotes players still playing in Melbourne Victory
- Appearances only consist of competitive domestic league appearances

== Season by season history ==
=== Y League ===
Season	League	Tms.	conf. size	P	W	D	L	GF	GA	GD	Pts	Pos	Finals	ref
2008–09	National Youth League	7	N/A	18	6	1	11	20	36	−16	20	6th	DNQ	
2009–10	National Youth League	9	N/A	24	7	8	9	36	37	−1	29	6th	DNQ	
2010–11	National Youth League	9	N/A	19	7	0	12	29	42	−13	21	8th	N/A (Note: No National Youth League Finals)	
2011–12	National Youth League	10	N/A	18	4	3	11	15	34	−19	15	10th	N/A	
2012–13	National Youth League	10	N/A	18	12	1	5	57	20	+37	37	1st	N/A	
2013–14	National Youth League	10	N/A	18	9	4	5	50	36	+14	31	3rd	N/A	
2014–15	National Youth League	10	N/A	18	8	3	7	34	33	+1	27	5th	N/A	
2015–16	National Youth League	10	5	8	3	0	5	17	22	−5	9	4th	DNQ	
2016–17	National Youth League	10	5	8	1	2	5	13	23	−10	5	5th	DNQ	
2017–18	National Youth League	10	5	8	4	1	3	17	25	−8	13	2nd	DNQ	
2018–19	Y-League	10	5	8	1	1	6	8	22	−14	4	5th	DNQ	
2019–20	Y-League	10	5	8	5	1	2	17	16	+1	16	1st	Runner up	
2020–21	Y-League	Tournament cancelled due to COVID-19 pandemic												
2021–22	A League Youth	Tournament cancelled due to COVID-19 pandemic												

=== National Premier Leagues ===
Season	League	Tier	Tms.	P	W	D	L	GF	GA	GD	Pts	Pos	Pro/Rel	NPL Finals	ref
2015	NPL VIC 1 East	2	10	28	17	4	7	87	44	+43	55	2nd	Pro (play off)	DNQ	
2016	NPL Victoria	1	14	26	3	1	22	24	68	−44	4 (Note: 6 point deduction)	14th	relegated	DNQ	
2017	NPL VIC 2 West	2	10	28	8	5	15	55	56	−1	29	9th	n/a	DNQ	
2018	NPL VIC 2 West	2	10	28	11	4	13	48	54	−6	34 (Note: 3 point deduction)	7th	n/a	DNQ	
2019	NPL VIC 2 West	2	10	28	6	7	15	36	48	−12	25	9th	relegated	DNQ	
2020	NPL Victoria 3	3	Cancelled due to the COVID-19 pandemic in Australia.												
2021	NPL Victoria 3	3	Cancelled due to the COVID-19 pandemic in Australia.												
2022	NPL Victoria 3	3	12	22	11	5	6	38	27	+11	38	4th	n/a	DNQ	
2023	NPL Victoria 3	3	12	22	13	3	6	47	22	+25	42	2nd	Promoted	DNQ	
2024	VPL 1	2	14	26	15	7	4	66	39	+27	52	1st	Promoted	DNQ	
2025	NPL Victoria	1	14	26	5	3	18	36	60	−24	18	12th	relegated	DNQ	

== Managerial history ==
Dates	Name	Honours	Refs
2008 – 12 March 2011	(Australia) Mehmet Durakovic		
20 March 2011 – 30 May 2016	(Wales) Darren Davies	2012–13 NYL Premiership	
30 May 2016 – 22 February 2020	(Australia) Gareth Naven		
12 September 2025 – Present	(Kosovo) Besart Beriahsa		

== See also ==
- Melbourne Victory FC
- Melbourne Victory FC (women)
- Melbourne Victory FC Youth (women)
