= Frankie Lagana =

Australian soccer player

Personal information
- Full name: Frank Lagana
- Date of birth: 22 February 1985 (age 41)
- Place of birth: Shepparton, Australia
- Height: 1.77 m (5 ft 10 in)
- Position: Attacking midfielder

Youth career
- 2002–2003: AIS

Senior career*
Years	Team	Apps	(Gls)
2003–2005	Empoli	0	(0)
2006	Heidelberg United	1	(0)
2007	Essendon Royals	20	(10)
2008	Oakleigh Cannons	21	(11)
2009	Melbourne Knights	14	(3)
2009–2010	Airdrie United	19	(0)
2010	Diamond Valley United		(1)
2011–2013	Oakleigh Cannons	37	(8)
2014	Goulburn Valley Suns	17	(1)
2015–2017	Shepparton South		
2018	Goulburn Valley Suns	13	(1)
- * Club domestic league appearances and goals as of 25 September 2018

Frankie Lagana (born 22 February 1985 in Shepparton, Australia) is a professional association football player who currently plays for Goulburn Valley Suns FC. He is a central midfielder, although he can play out left. His Airdrie United debut came in the 3-2 friendly defeat to Norwich City at New Broomfield, Airdrie. Before making the move to Scotland, Lagana had been playing for the Melbourne Knights in the Victorian Premier League.

In 2014, he returned to his hometown for Goulburn Valley Suns' inaugural year in the National Premier Leagues Victoria.
