= Louis Clark (footballer) =

English footballer

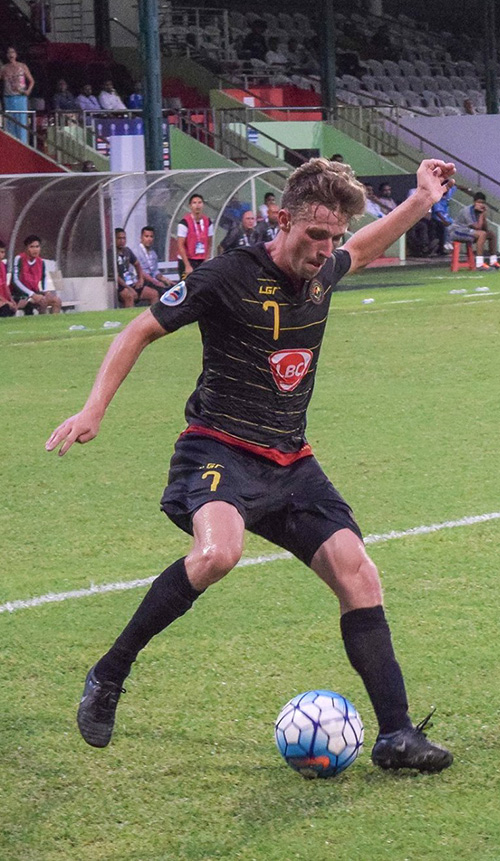

Personal information
- Full name: Louis Max Clark
- Date of birth: 10 June 1990 (age 36)
- Place of birth: Brighton, England
- Position: Forward

Team information
- Current team: Worthing

Youth career
- 1999–2007: Brighton & Hove Albion
- 2007–2009: Lewes FC

College career
Years	Team	Apps	(Gls)
2009–2010	Ashland University	23	(6)
2011–2013	Syracuse Orange	53	(23)

Senior career*
Years	Team	Apps	(Gls)
2014	Cobram Victory FC	29	(10)
2015–2016	Kaya Futbol Club	52	(29)
2016	Tampines Rovers	0	(0)
2017–	Worthing	0	(0)

Managerial career
- 2013: Syracuse University (undergrad assistant)
- 2014: Cobram Victory FC (player-manager)
- 2014–2016: Kaya FC Academy
- * Club domestic league appearances and goals

Louis Max Clark (born 10 June 1990) is an English footballer who plays in the Isthmian League for Worthing. He can either play as a winger or a striker. He started his football career playing for Brighton & Hove Albion, his youth club, before moving to Lewes in 2007.

He then moved to the US to play as a student-athlete in Ashland University from 2009 to 2013 before earning a scholarship for an NCAA Division I school, Syracuse University.

After college, he went to Australia to play professional for two clubs, Myrtleford FC (2013) and Cobram Victory FC (2013–2014). In August 2014, he signed for Kaya Futbol Club. He is also one of the youth coaches for his club's youth academy, Kaya FC Academy.

== Early years ==
Clark was born in Brighton, England, where he played for his hometown club, Brighton & Hove Albion, at the age of 9. At 17, he moved to Lewes, where he met his present coach, Chris Greatwich.

== College career ==
Clark moved to the US to play college soccer for NCAA II school Ashland University, but he was banned to play in his freshman year due to NCAA amateurism rules. In his sophomore year, he played with the Eagles, scoring 15 goals for the whole tournament, which earned him an offer to play as a student-athlete for division I school Syracuse University, where he spent and played his two remaining years in college. He scored 25 goals in 53 appearances. He was named one of the best midfielders in the NCAA 2013 class.

== Professional career ==
=== Myrtleford FC and Cobram Victory FC ===
After being undrafted in the 2013 MLS SuperDraft, he went to Australia to continue his football career. He signed for Myrtleford FC in 2013, but eventually signed for Cobram Victory FC later that year. He signed for Cobram Victory FC as a player-manager in 2014.

=== Kaya Futbol Club ===
In 2014, he signed for one of the oldest clubs in Philippines, Kaya F.C., reuniting him with his former Lewes FC teammate, Chris Greatwich. On his first cup tournament, the 2014 FA League Cup, he won his first individual award, the Golden Boot, for scoring 10 goals in the tournament.

Following the league tournament, he first shown his impact to the United Football League by scoring 2 goals against one of Kaya FC's rival clubs, Global FC. However, the winger missed some games in the latter part of the UFL league due to injuries. Despite his day-to-day status entering the 2015 UFL Cup tournament, he recovered completely right before the semifinals. He put the fifth goal for the penalty shootout in the semifinals match against Stallion FC, which booked Kaya FC's place in the UFL Cup final against Ceres-La Salle FC.

During his first year at the club, Clark helped Kaya FC win its first piece of silverware since 2009 and earned them a spot in the 2016 AFC Cup. It was also Louis Clark's first trophy at the professional level.

Clark was named one of the eligible foreign players that Kaya FC will be using for its first major international club tournament. On 12 April 2016 he scored his first goal in an international match in their 3–0 win against Singaporean club Balestier Khalsa in the 2016 AFC Cup.

In November 2016, it was reported that Clark would be signing for S.League side Tampines Rovers for the 2017 S.League season. However, after sustaining a serious injury in December 2016, it was announced that Clark's transfer to the club was cancelled after the injury ruled him out for the entirety of the 2017 S.League season.

=== Tampines Rovers ===
Clark signed a contract with Tampines Rovers in November 2016. Howevern in December 2016 it was announced, that his contract was terminated, after Clark suffered a serious injury. Clark damaged his ankle, including cartilage tear, after getting his foot stuck in a pothole while jogging back home in England.

=== Worthing FC ===
Clark joined Worthing on 1 February 2017.

== Coaching ==
Aside from being a professional footballer, Clark is also a football coach. He was an undergraduate assistant coach for Syracuse University in 2013. Moreover, he was also the player-manager of Cobram Victory FC in 2014. He's now part of the coaching staff of Kaya FC Academy, the youth academy of his Kaya FC.
