= Cobram Victory FC =

Cobram Victory
- Full name: Cobram Victory Football Club
- Nickname: Victory
- Founded: 1998
- Dissolved: 2014
- Ground: Apex Reserve, Cobram, Victoria
- Manager: Louis Clark
- League: Goulburn North East Football Association
- 2013: 3rd
| Home colours | Away colours |

Cobram Victory was a football club located in Cobram, Victoria, Australia, a small town on the Murray River. They competed in the Goulburn North East Football Association.

Cobram Victory is most notable for its giant-killing run in the 2011 Mirabella Cup.

== History ==
Victory played its first season of GNEFA in 2007, having previously competed under the name Murray Border-United in the Albury Wodonga Football Association.

March 2010 saw Craig Carley, formerly of AFC Wimbledon and also Metropolitan Police FC join the club and was appointed as coach in season 2011.

The club received attention in 2011 in the Mirabella Cup, defeating major clubs Whittlesea Zebras and Clifton Hill before finally falling to the eventual runners-up, Victorian Premier League side Melbourne Knights in the Super 12 stage.

Victory went on to win the Regional Challenge Cup, defeating Ballarat Red Devils at AAMI Park

At the end of the 2012 season Cobram Victory claimed the inaugural Regional Premier League title, with a 5–0 win over Shepparton SC at Deakin Reserve. In 2014 the club merged with Cobram Soccer Club to Cobram Roar FC.

== Colours ==
Cobram Victory is nicknamed "Victory" and its home colours are white with yellow trimming and a black V, both in imitation of A-League club Melbourne Victory. The club logo also tributes Melbourne Victory in its design.

== Honours ==
- Regional Premier League:

Winners (1): 2012

- Dockerty Regional Challenge Cup:

Winners (2): 2011, 2013

== See also ==
- 2011 Mirabella Cup
