= Ahmed Faraz Gulzari =

Pakistani footballer

Personal information
- Full name: Ahmed Faraz Gulzari
- Date of birth: 25 June 2007 (age 19)
- Place of birth: Quetta, Pakistan
- Height: 1.75 m (5 ft 9 in)
- Position: Forward

Team information
- Current team: Melbourne Victory Youth

Youth career
- 2019–2021: Berwick City
- 2021–2025: Melbourne City Youth
- 2026–: Melbourne Victory Youth

International career
Years	Team	Apps	(Gls)
2025–	Pakistan	3	(0)

Ahmed Faraz Gulzari (born 25 June 2007) is a Pakistani footballer who plays as a forward for Melbourne Victory Youth and the Pakistan national team.

== Club career ==
Gulzari started playing for Melbourne based club Berwick City in 2021. He joined Melbourne City Youth in 2024. At the 2025 Victoria Premier League 1 season, he scored 12 goals in 22 appearances with the under-23 team.

== International career ==
Gulzari made his senior international debut with Pakistan against Afghanistan at the 2027 AFC Asian Cup qualification on 9 October 2025, ending in a goalless draw.

== Playing style ==
Gulzari mainly plays as a winger in both left and right, and also play as a striker.

== Career statistics ==
=== International ===
As of 18 November 2025

Appearances and goals by national team and year
National team	Year	Apps	Goals
Pakistan	2025	3	0
Total		3	0
