= John Cain Memorial Park =

Football ground in Thornbury, Victoria

- Interactive map of John Cain Memorial Park
- Location: Thornbury, Victoria
- Coordinates: 37°45′47″S 145°1′25″E
- Owner: City of Darebin
- Capacity: 5,000
- Surface: Grass

Construction
- Opened: 2004

Tenant
- Northcote City FC

John Cain Memorial Park is an Australian association football ground in Thornbury, a suburb of Melbourne, Victoria. The ground is named after John Cain 'Senior' (1882–1957) former Victorian Premier and father of John Cain former Premier of Victoria 1982–90. It serves as the home ground of Northcote City FC, who currently play in Victoria Premier Leagues 1.

The ground has an estimated total capacity of 5,000, featuring a grandstand with undercover seating for 1,000 spectators, with a grass hill surrounds the rest of the pitch. The ground is adjacent to the Darebin International Sports Centre, which incorporates the State Football Centre.
