= History of Melbourne City FC =

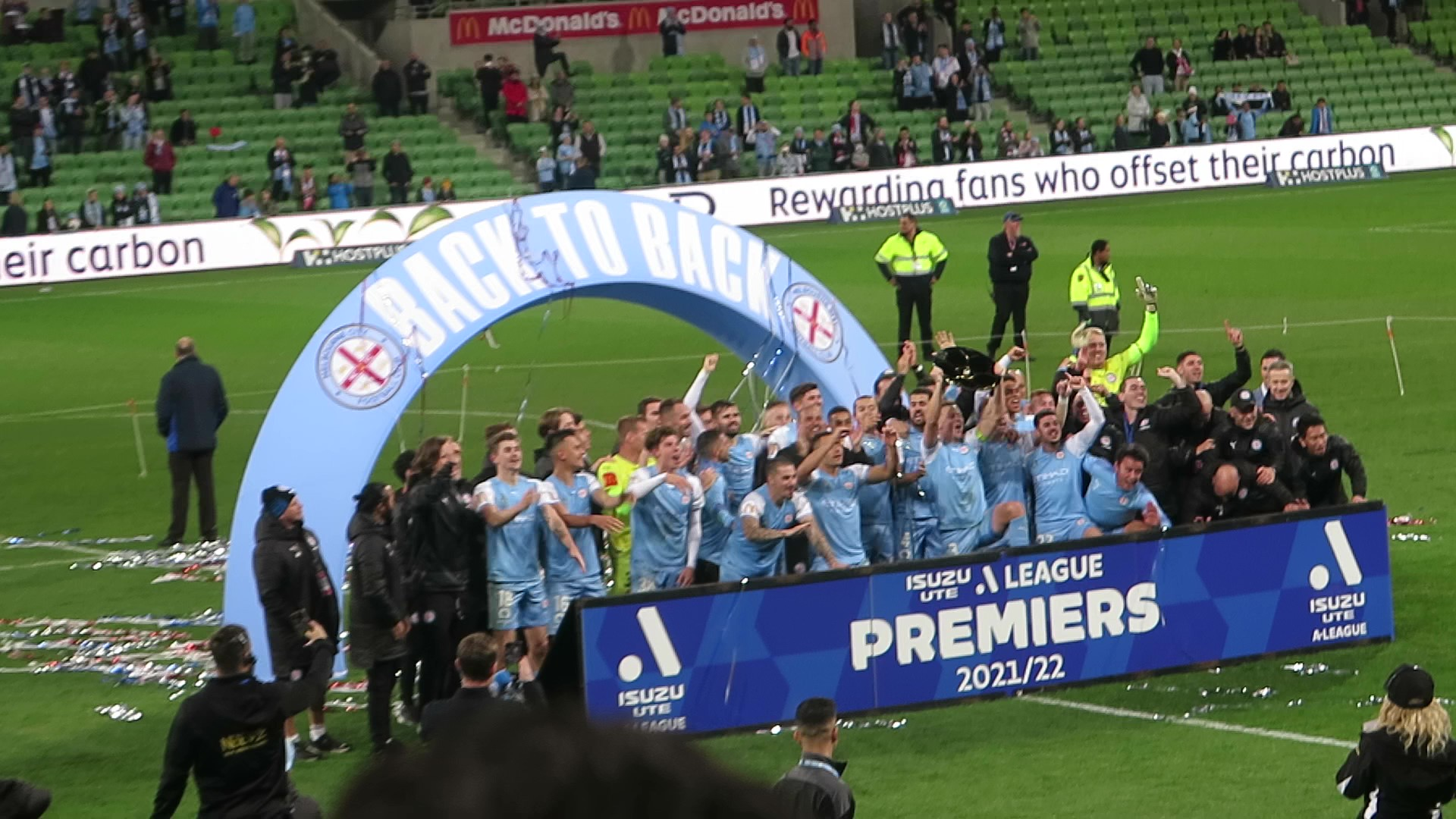
Melbourne City celebrating their 2021–22 A-League Men Premiership trophy at AAMI Park on 9 May 2022.

The history of Melbourne City Football Club covers the time from the club's foundation to change of ownership to periods of success.

Melbourne City Football Club was founded in 2009 as Melbourne Heart; an expansion club to the A-League Men for the 2010–11 season. They were bought by the City Football Group for $12 million in 2014, subsequently changing the club's name to Melbourne City.

Their first trophy was won in the 2016 FFA Cup final through John van 't Schip. It was only until the 2020–21 season where the club would win their first league premiership and championship. They became the first Australian club to win three consecutive league premierships in 2020–21, 2021–22 and 2022–23.

== Formation ==
After the dissolution of the National Soccer League in 2003, brought about by the Crawford Report, plans were drawn up for a new revamped national competition to begin the following season. Two separate plans put forward by the Professional Footballers Australia and Libero Consulting called for the new league to be established under the name "Australian/Australasian Premier League" with two Melbourne clubs to feature as foundation members of the competition. One to be playing in the North West of the city, and another to be playing in the South East of the city representing the two population loads of Melbourne.

Despite the calls for the new soccer competition to feature two clubs from Melbourne, in 2004 Football Federation Australia, opting for a "one city, one team" policy, announced that the Melbourne Victory had won the licence to be the only Melbourne club to compete in the new national competition, known as the A-League. A 5-year moratorium was also established preventing any other expansion sides from the eight original A-league teams' areas entering the competition until the 2010–11 season, allowing Victory five seasons to establish itself in the Melbourne market.

By 2007 the Victorian Major Projects Minister Theo Theophanous put forward the idea of a second Melbourne club being formed to be a founding tenant at the Melbourne Rectangular Stadium, during the protracted negotiations with Melbourne Victory due to the early design of the stadium being smaller than Victory's then season average crowd.

Speculation about a second Melbourne side progressed and on 12 February 2007, South Melbourne FC revealed that they were courting approaches from private investors with the prospect of being the second A-League club based in Melbourne. As part of the South Melbourne bid, the club was to be privatised and the bid name was to be 'Southern Cross FC'.

On 1 March 2008 former Carlton Football Club vice-president and businessman Colin DeLutis expressed his interest in a second Melbourne A-League side, with an approach to the FFA to become sole owner of the second licence with the bid name of 'Melbourne City', not to be confused with the current club Melbourne City. FFA chief executive Ben Buckley raised the possibility of expanding the A-League from eight to 12 teams in May 2008, in readiness for the 2009–10 season. Buckley also revealed the existence of a third Melbourne bid tentatively known as 'Melbourne Heart' backed by Peter Sidwell, to compete with the two other bids of Southern Cross FC and Melbourne City. On 25 July 2008, the Melbourne City bid dropped out of the bidding process leaving the Melbourne Heart and Southern Cross FC bids as the last two bids standing. By September 2008 the Melbourne Heart bid was awarded exclusive negotiating rights for the league's 11th licence, beating out the South Melbourne-backed Southern Cross FC bid. Negotiations continued until Sidwell's group, Melbourne Heart, was awarded the licence to join the A-League's 2010–11 season by the FFA on 12 June 2009.

== Early years (2010–2014) ==
Heart started its inaugural season against Central Coast Mariners on 5 August 2010, at their home ground AAMI Park, losing 1–0. The club's first ever goal was an own goal scored by Ben Kantarovski in the Heart's second league game, a 1–1 draw against Newcastle Jets. Melbourne Heart's first win was a 1–0 victory over North Queensland Fury, which came in the fifth round of their first A-League season on 4 September 2010. They contested the first ever Melbourne Derby against Melbourne Victory on 8 October 2010, and won 2–1. In the middle of their season, they went seven matches without winning (six losses and a draw) and over five hours without scoring a goal. This was turned around when they travelled to play Adelaide United and beat them 2–1 in the final five minutes, despite trailing at 1–0 for all of the second half up to that time. Heart finished their first season on equal points with Newcastle Jets, but behind on goal difference in eighth position. They failed to make it into the top six teams to reach the finals, despite sitting in sixth position for majority of the season.

On 7 July 2011, the club announced it would take part in the inaugural Hawaiian Islands Invitational from 23–25 February 2012. The squad was set to be made up of emerging youth players as the tournament overlaps with the 2011–12 A-League season. Taking part in the Invitational was Japan's Yokohama, South Korea's Incheon United FC and reigning MLS Cup winners the Colorado Rapids from the United States. Melbourne Heart drew against Busan IPark and lost 0–1 against Colorado Rapids.

Melbourne Heart signed former rival Melbourne Victory player Fred on 20 June 2011, as a marquee player, he replaced Simon Colosimo as captain of the Heart

On 1 September 2011, Heart added the addition of a youth team to the club, which would compete in the A-League's National Youth League. The youth team launched with former Australia international John Aloisi as the inaugural youth team head coach, while highly respected Victorian coach Arthur Papas was brought in as his assistant.

In 2012 the Melbourne Heart Futsal team was founded. They play in the F-League which is top tier of Australian Futsal.

Melbourne Heart's first game for the 2011–12 A-League season was against Newcastle Jets at Ausgrid Stadium. The Heart were defeated 3–2, after a goal by Byun Sung-Hwan in added time. Heart lost their first two matches in a row after being defeated by Perth Glory at home, however they then went on to get 21 points out of thirty, making them 3rd on the ladder.

After their successful start to the first half of the season, Melbourne Heart only won two of their remaining matches, coinciding with the loss of Fred to injury, and Dugandzic, Aziz Behich and Jason Hoffman to international Olyroos duty, They finished 6th on the ladder, enough to make the finals, and had their best season in the club's history.

Heart's first final was against Perth Glory, where they were defeated 3–0 at nib stadium. On 1 February 2012, Melbourne Heart coach John van't Schip announced he was leaving the club at the end of the season due to family reasons.

Melbourne Heart announced on 8 May 2012 that former Socceroo and Melbourne Heart Youth team coach John Aloisi, had been promoted from his existing position and signed as head coach for 3 years. During the off season Heart were stung by the transfer out of several young key players in Curtis Good, Brendan Hamill and Eli Babalj. However key off season signings included Socceroos Richard Garcia and Vince Grella, and two VISA players in Croatian striker Josip Tadić and Swiss/Liberian defender Patrick Gerhardt.

Heart opened the season with a 2–1 win over rival, Melbourne Victory. The first half of the season was plagued however by inconsistent performances which left the club languishing in last place at the end of 2012, due mainly to second half fade outs.

During the January transfer window, Heart lost a further two key players in Michael Marrone and Aziz Behich on transfers, as well as midfielder Vince Grella to retirement. However they did bolster the squad with returning striker Eli Babalj and Dutch midfielder Marcel Meeuwis.

The new year saw more consistent results at home with 4 wins in a row, resulting in a gradual climb up the table. However, a run of poor results saw Heart finish in 9th place out of 10 teams on the A-League ladder, their worst ever A-League finish. Melbourne Heart veterans Clint Bolton, Simon Colosimo, Matt Thompson and Fred, were released by the Heart at the conclusion of the 2012-13 A-League season.

Onfield in season 2013–14, Melbourne Heart struggled, failing to win a game until 17 January 2014 (15 matches into the season), recording just six wins across the season. The high point of the season was a 4-0 drubbing of derby rivals Melbourne Victory in March 2014. Striker David Williams managed to score 11 times across the season, while marquee signings Orlando Engelaar and Harry Kewell were restricted to limited game time due to injury. Kewell eventually retired from professional football at the end of the season. Melbourne Heart finished the 2013–14 A-League season in 10th position.

== City Football Group takeover and first trophy (2014–2019) ==
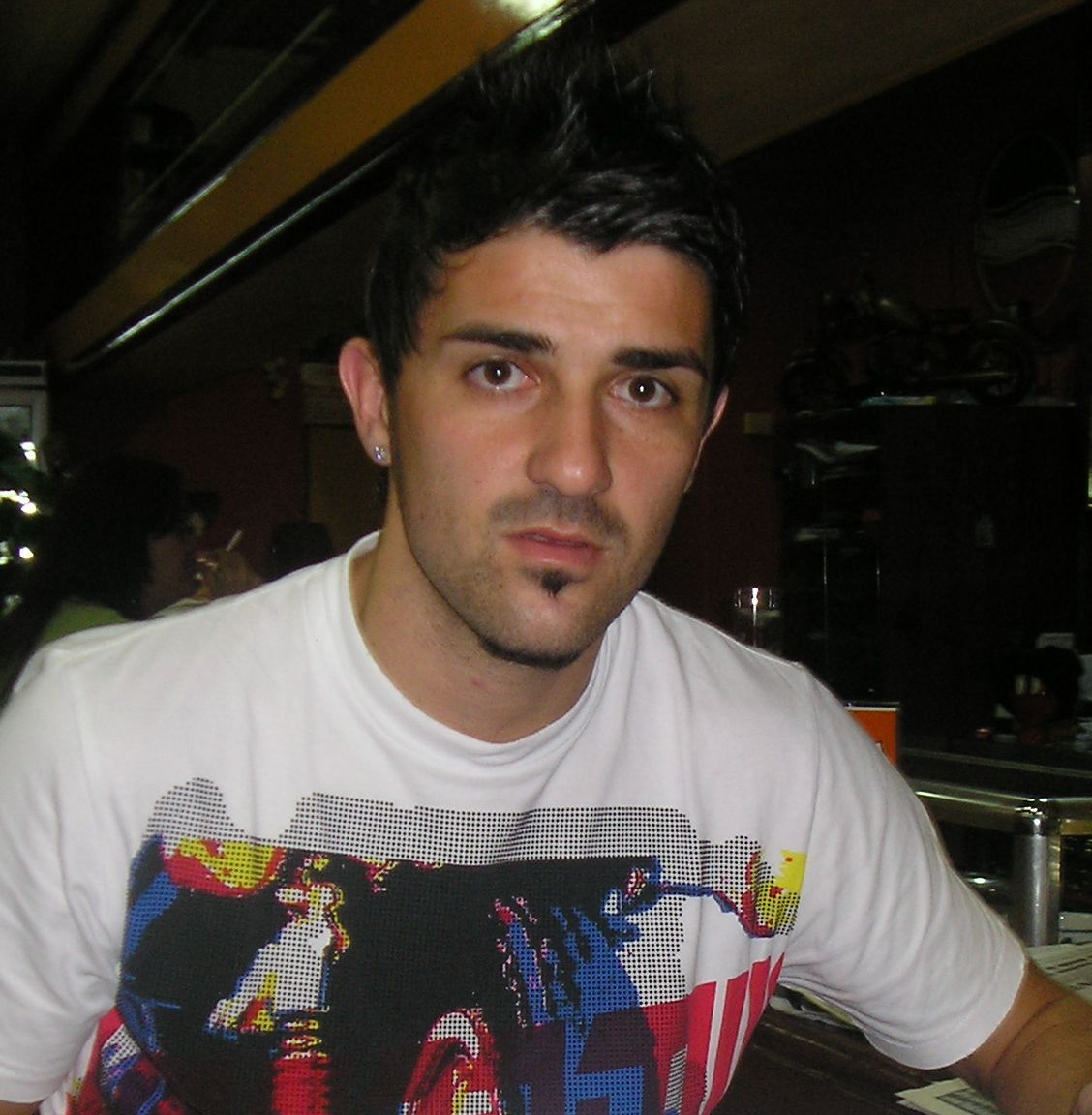
Spanish World Cup winner David Villa played for Melbourne City in 2014

It was announced on 23 January 2014 that the City Football Group had acquired Melbourne Heart for $12 million. The deal involves CFG acquiring 80% of Heart, the other 20% to be held by a consortium of businessmen allied to Rugby league club Melbourne Storm. On 5 June 2014, the team obtained Spanish World Cup-winning striker David Villa on loan from New York City FC, another team owned by the City Football Group. Villa was expected to play in the A-League until New York City entered Major League Soccer in 2015.

Villa played only 4 of an expected 10 matches, scoring twice, before being recalled by New York. Although none of the matches were won, coach John van 't Schip credited Villa with bringing attention to the new team, and it was estimated that his presence trebled the club's attendance.

Ferran Soriano, City Football Group's chief executive, expressed hope that the partnership between Melbourne City FC, New York City FC and Manchester City FC will create synergies between the clubs. Soriano stated that the access to global scouting networks and operational experience in soccer performance, technical development and sports science would be some of the most important synergies shared between the clubs.

In August 2015, City Football Group bought out the Holding M.S. Australia consortium to acquire 100% ownership of Melbourne City Football Club. The 2015–16 season saw City's highest league finish at fourth place and most wins in a season. The finals series saw City finish at the semi-finals losing 4–1 to Adelaide United. By the end of the season, Uruguayan striker Bruno Fornaroli scored 28 goals overall and the first to score 20 before the finals series; the most ever scored in a Melbourne City season so far.

In 2016, Melbourne City had finally reached a major final, that being the 2016 FFA Cup final against Sydney FC on 30 November 2016, in which they won 1–0 at home to win their first club trophy by Tim Cahill scoring the only goal by a header and Bruno Fornaroli winning the Mark Viduka Medal, spectated by 18,751; the highest attended Australia Cup match. Head Coach John van 't Schip resigned from his position to return to the Netherlands and help care for his terminally-ill father. Michael Valkanis was caretaker head coach afterwards for the remainder of the season. In the end, they finished the league at fourth place spot again and lost 2–0 in the elimination-finals to Perth Glory. Afterwards, Tim Cahill won the 2016–17 A-League Goal of the Year for his 35-yard goal in the Melbourne Derby back in October 2016.

Englishman Warren Joyce was appointed new Head Coach for the club for to the 2017–18 season. Their FFA Cup defending campaign in 2017 was lost to reigning runners-up Sydney FC after a 2–0 loss in the quarter-finals. City made a perfect start in their first four league games to the top of the table. They equalled their biggest winning margin by winning 5–0 over Adelaide United in January 2018. Occasional winless streaks at times throughout the season, would drop City towards second and third place spots, as they made their highest finish so far at third place spot qualifying for the elimination-finals and thoroughly won it 2–0 against Brisbane Roar, but losing the semi-finals 2–1 to the Newcastle Jets, again falling one short of their first A-League Grand Final.

Their next season in 2018–19 wasn't anymore promising, as City again finished in the quarter-finals of the FFA Cup and finishing fifth at the end of the league season. During so, their top goalscorer Bruno Fornaroli parted ways with the club in February 2019, ultimately being replaced by new striker Jamie Maclaren on a four-year deal plus Englishman Shayon Harrison on loan. Reaching the finals series, City lost 1–0 in extra time in their elimination-final against Adelaide United via a late 119th minute goal. Joyce's two-year contract was not renewed, and effectively left the club after the end of the season.

== Grand Finals and three consecutive premierships (2019–present) ==
Frenchman Erick Mombaerts was appointed new head coach for Melbourne City ahead of the 2019–20 season. They reached the 2019 FFA Cup final against Adelaide United in which they lost 4–0 in the end. A strong start to the league season; one loss in their first seven would keep City at the top of the table. Their bye featured the next round in Round 8 would see them drop first place for the rest of the season. The season was ultimately suspended in March 2020, due to the COVID-19 pandemic in Australia which forced matches played behind closed doors and teams traveling interstate to New South Wales to continue the season. With three games remaining for City, they were unbeaten in those three to finish in second place; qualifying for the semi-finals. After a thorough 2–0 win in the semi-finals over new club Western United, City had qualified for their first ever A-League Grand Final at Bankwest Stadium (now CommBank Stadium) against Sydney FC which was lost 1–0 in extra time, as City claimed runners-up medals in all three trophy instances.

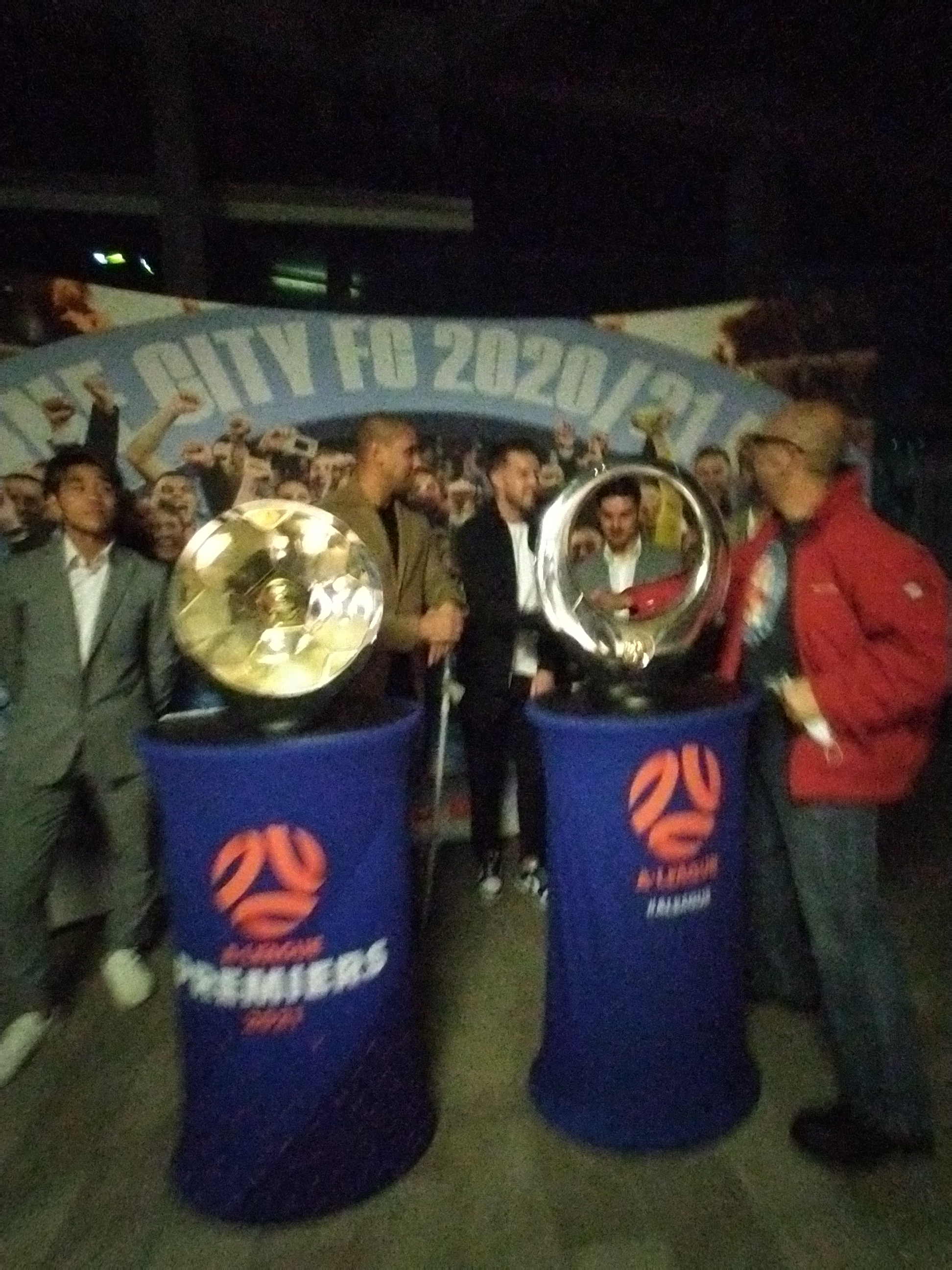
Melbourne City celebrating their 2020–21 A-League Premiership and Championship trophies at Federation Square

In the 2020–21 season, City couldn't participate in the 2020 FFA Cup due to its cancellation by the COVID-19 pandemic in Australia nor the 2021 AFC Champions League due to Australian clubs withdrawals. City started their league season poorly; four losses in their first six games. Despite this, they recovered their form by a club record of six consecutive wins; including their biggest ever win by winning 6–0 in the Melbourne Derby on 6 March 2021. Only one loss followed after the winning streak, but set another club record of ten matches unbeaten afterwards; only setting their new biggest win record this time 7–0 in the Melbourne Derby on 17 April 2021. The final game of the unbeaten streak was a 1–0 win against the Central Coast Mariners which won City their first ever A-League premiership with three games remaining on 22 May 2021. Despite City having to play their home semi-final interstate at Netstrata Jubilee Stadium in Sydney, they prevailed 2–0 over inaugural club Macarthur FC for a rematch of the previous Grand Final against Sydney FC hosted at a sold-out AAMI Park. City claimed their first A-League championship by winning 3–1 over Sydney to goals by Nathaniel Atkinson, Scott Jamieson and Scott Galloway.

Their double defence in the 2021–22 began with City losing on penalties at home to the Wellington Phoenix in the quarter-finals despite not conceding a single goal in their FFA Cup campaign. The league season saw a promising start from one loss in eight games to start the season, but struggles with the top of the table to Western United throughout the season, until a new club record of 11 matches unbeaten would see City hold first place spot. City were forced a break from the league due to their inaugural participation in the AFC Champions League in Pathum Thani, Thailand where despite going unbeaten in the group finished second and didn't finish as one of the best second-placed teams. They returned to Australia, with two league games remaining losing 2–0 away to bottom placed Perth Glory pressured by rivals Melbourne Victory sitting two points ahead of City with one match left to play at home against the Wellington Phoenix. City won the match 2–1 to win the premiership by one point and become the second A-League Men club to win back-to-back premierships. With the new two-legged semi-final rule in place from this season onwards, City playing their two legs against Adelaide United and winning 2–1 on aggregate heading for their third consecutive Grand Final against locals Western United, losing 2–0 in City's third grand final.

City in the 2022–23 season saw them be eliminated in back-to-back matches to the Wellington Phoenix in the Australia Cup. They would go six matches unbeaten to start the season prior to the 2022 FIFA World Cup mid-season break. During the break, it was when Head Coach Patrick Kisnorbo left the club to join Ligue 1 club Troyes in November 2022, replaced by women's head coach at the time Rado Vidošić. City lost their first game since the end of the break and head coach appointment. The following week starting Monday, 12 December 2022 saw an APL decision for the 2023, 2024 and 2025 Grand Finals to be hosted in Sydney which the club agreed with despite fan and other club backlashes. That Saturday saw the Melbourne Derby which saw fan protests, flares, walkouts and a violent pitch invasion at the 20th minute by Victory fans as the match was abandoned. Throughout the rest of the season, they lost only two of those next 19 matches and claiming a third consecutive premiership while also going undefeated at home all season. Their two-legged semi-finals against Sydney FC was won 5–1 on aggregate to qualify for their fourth consecutive Grand Final at neutral CommBank Stadium for the second time, against the Central Coast Mariners which they lost 6–1 for three Grand Final losses in their past four.
