= Northcote City FC =

Association football club in Victoria, Australia

- Full name: Northcote City Football Club
- Nicknames: City, Hraklis (Iraklis)
- Founded: 1960; 66 years ago
- Ground: John Cain Memorial Park
- President: Michael Skliros
- Manager: Max Clarke
- League: Victoria Premier League 1
- 2026: 4th of 14 (promoted via playoffs) NPL Victoria 2027
- Website: www.northcotecity.com.au
Home colours	Away colours

Northcote City Football Club (Iraklis) is a soccer club based on the border of Thornbury and Northcote, Victoria (Australia). Formed in 1960 by local Greek Australians, the club currently competes in the Victoria Premier League 1.

In 2011, Northcote won the inaugural Mirabella Cup, their first Victorian top-level success. In season 2013, Northcote City won their first Victorian Premier League Championship, defeating Bentleigh Greens SC 3–2 after extra time at AAMI Park.

== History ==
=== Foundation & Early Years ===
Northcote City FC was formed in 1960 by a group of Greek migrants new to Australia with a passion for sport and a need to form friendships in a new country, with soccer being the major connection.

Northcote City FC is the third oldest Greek club in Victoria behind South Melbourne FC and Heidelberg United FC. In its formative years the club fielded teams not only in soccer but also in volleyball, basketball and table tennis.

A milestone in the club's history was moving to John Cain Memorial Park in 1979, which even today is considered one of the state's best soccer venues.

In its formative years, the club was known as Hercules before adopting the Princes Park Hercules name given that it was playing at Princes Park, before changing venues to Fairfield Park in 1977 and adopting Collingwood City as the club's new name. The new name was to only last a short time however and in 1980 the club clinched a significant breakthrough by negotiating with the Northcote City Council a move to John Cain Memorial Park and another name change for the club with Northcote City SC the new identity. To this very day it is still the club's home and name.

The club first gained promotion into the Victorian Soccer Federation leagues in 1964 after competing in the amateur competitions in its formative years. In 1965 it achieved its first ever championship winning the Metropolitan League Division 4, suffering only one loss for the year. In a somewhat golden era for the club, consistent finishes in the upper reaches of the ladder, saw the club achieve a second championship in the 60's with the Metropolitan League Division 3 title won in 1969. The early to mid 70's saw the club struggling to make an impression on Metropolitan League Division 2 until a wonderful 1977 campaign saw the club finish second to Doveton and thus gain promotion to Metropolitan League Division 1 for the first time in its history. Another top 4 finish in 1980 saw the club achieve the ultimate and win promotion to the Victorian State League, which would later become the Victorian Premier League. The 1980s were not kind to the club and many bottom half of the table finishes ultimately saw the club relegated in 1991 back to the State League Division 1 competition.

The 1990s were not much kinder when a Victorian Soccer Federation restructure in 1999 saw the club relegated to State League Division 2 despite finishing 5 places form the bottom of the ladder. If the 1980 and 90's were not kind to the club, then the first decade of the new millennium is arguably the greatest in the club's rich history. An undefeated Championship success in 2002 in State League 2 North West saw it regain its standing in State League Division 1, a feat that lasted only until 2006. However the undoubted turning point came in 2007 when Peter Tsolakis was appointed coach of the club and after a mediocre first year at the helm, back-to-back championships in State League Division 2 South-East in 2008 and State League Division 1 in 2009 saw the club regain its status to the Victorian Premier league in 2010, coinciding with its 50-year anniversary. In their first year back in the Victorian Premier League, Northcote City finished 5th on 31 points, qualifying for the Elimination Final which they lost 3–1 to Heidelberg United. In 2011 Northcote finished 6th on 39 points, which meant they missed out on the finals by 1 point, finishing behind Heidelberg who ended the season on 40 points. Despite failing to reach the finals, they did manage to end the season with some silverware, defeating Melbourne Knights FC 2–0 at AAMI Park to lift the Mirabella Cup.

=== Premiership, Championship and Recent Years ===
Northcote City enjoyed the most successful season in its history in 2013, the same year a stalwart and life member of the club, Emmanuel Himonas died, winning the minor premiership in the Victorian Premier League, followed by winning the VPL Grand Final against Bentleigh Greens 3–2. Senior Coach Goran Lozanovski was awarded Victorian Premier League Coach of year and striker Milos Lujic won the golden boot.

The following season, Northcote finished 7th in the new National Premier Leagues Victoria competition, which replaced the old VPL. Northcote then finished 10th in 2015 and championship winning head coach Goran Lozanovski departed the club. Lozanovski had been at the club since 2011, starting as an assistant and assuming the head role at the beginning of 2012.

Alex Gymnopoulos was announced as the new manager in September 2015. Gymnopoulos had previously held the position of U20 head coach at the club. After a disastrous start to season 2016, which saw Northcote manage just one point from seven NPL Victoria games and exit the 2016 FFA Cup to National Premier Leagues Victoria 2 side St Albans Saints, manager Alex Gymnopoulos was sacked. In April 2016, Northcote announced the return of former head coach and VPL winner Goran Lozanovski as Gymnopoulos' replacement. Lozanovski signed eleven players in the mid-season transfer window, including former Newcastle Jets FC striker Braedyn Crowley. "Lozza"'s return was marked by some upturn in form, including a 5–0 victory over Melbourne Knights, where Crowley scored all five goals, but also more heavy defeats, including 5–0 losses in successive weeks to Hume City FC and Bentleigh. Relegation to NPL2 was confirmed on the final matchday for Northcote, following a 3–0 loss to Oakleigh Cannons. Lozanovski stepped down from his position at the end of the season.

In preparation of its first season outside of the top-flight since 2009, Northcote hired Željko Kuzman as its new manager for the 2017 season. City achieved promotion back to the NPL after just one season out with one round to play with a 1–0 win over Moreland City FC.

After the 2017 season, Kuzman departed the club to take up a role with Dandenong City SC. Northcote reacted by signing former Port Melbourne SC coach Eric Vassiliadis. City qualified for the 2018 FFA Cup national stages, but went down to Devonport Strikers in the Round of 32. Northcote were relegated in 2018. Vassiliadis resigned from his position as head manager after relegation was confirmed.

Northcote announced the return of Peter Tsolakis for the 2019 NPL2 season.

== Crest and colours ==
Northcote adopt the colours of Greek Superleague team Iraklis from Thessaloniki.

== Current squads ==
=== Senior team ===
Below is the squad for the 2025 season.

Note: Flags indicate national team as defined under FIFA eligibility rules; some limited exceptions apply. Players may hold more than one non-FIFA nationality.

No.	Pos.	Nation	Player
1	GK	AUS	Ahmad Taleb
2	DF	AUS	Josh Wilkins
4	DF	AUS	Dean Larson
5	MF	NIR	Liam Nolan
6	MF	AUS	Thierry Iradukunda
7	FW	WAL	Alun Webb
8	MF	AUS	Eoin Ashton
9	FW	AUS	Yani Nassis
10	FW	AUS	Dom Falla
11	FW	AUS	Michael Katsoulis
13	FW	AUS	Martin Palinic
14	MF	ENG	Joseph Tweats

No.	Pos.	Nation	Player
15	DF	AUS	Jae Ciarma
17	MF	AUS	Zac Bates
18	FW	CAN	Devin O'Hea
22	MF	AUS	Dante Siccita
23	MF	IRL	Sam Warde
24	FW	AUS	Ethan Brooks
30	GK	AUS	Noah Calamatta
77	FW	AUS	Mohammad Sumaoro
—	DF	AUS	Greg Zacharias
—	FW	AUS	Anthony Dezic
—	FW	AUS	Geoffrey Lino
—	FW	AUS	Zack Appleton
—	FW	AUS	Aston Monteleone

Head of Football: Kat Smith

Head Coach: Max Clarke Assistant Coach: Matt Papadimitriou

Senior Goalkeeper Coach: Jeff Oliver

== Honours ==
=== Senior team ===
- Victorian Premier League/ NPL Victoria Champions 2013
- Victoria Premier League 1 Playoffs Promotion Winners 2026
- National Premier Leagues Victoria 2 West Premiers 2017
- Mirabella Cup Champions 2011
- Victorian State League Division 1 Champions 2009
- Victorian State League Division 2 South East Champions 2008
- Victorian State League Division 2 North West Champions 2002
- Victorian Metropolitan League Division 1 Promotion 1980
- Victorian Metropolitan League Division 2 Runners Up 1977
- Victorian Metropolitan League Division 3 Champions 1969
- Victorian Metropolitan League Division 4 Champions 1965
- Hellenic Cup Champions 1985, 1986, 1999 Runners Up 1983, 2002

=== Under-21/Reserve team ===
- Victorian Premier League U21 Participants 1991, 2010, 2011, 2012, 2013
- Victorian Premier League U21 Champions 2013
- Victorian State League Division 2 U21 South East Champions 2005
- Hellenic Cup Runners Up 2006
