= North Eastern Soccer League =

Goulburn North East Football Association was an association football (soccer) competition in Shepparton, Victoria. It was first known as the North Eastern Soccer League from the competition's inception in 1971 until February 2009. It was then renamed into the Goulburn North East Football Association. Between 2012 and 2014 the men's top division was known as the Regional Premier League.

Ten clubs participated in the GNEFA across various divisions and age groups for men, women, boys and girls.

In 2016 the league would close and 4 of the remaining clubs, Shepparton South, Shepparton United, Shepparton SC and Tatura SC all joined the Bendigo Amateur Soccer League.

== Clubs ==
Shepparton

Formerly named as Lemnos Makedonia, Shepparton is nicknamed "The Reds". Shepparton's home colours are red and black stripes, similar to Macedonian team FK Vardar.

Shepparton once had former Cambridge Utd player Michael Kyd play a guest stint at the club.

Shepparton is the GNEFA's most successful senior club, having won eight premierships as Lemnos and six as Shepparton for a total of 14. Shepparton home games are played at Vibert Reserve. The club forms the base of Preston Lions supporters club of country Victoria.

Shepparton United

Shepparton United is nicknamed "United" or "The Blues" and is the reigning women's premier of the GNEFA.

United's home colours are all blue. United has won six GNEFA men's premierships, the most recent in 1998 while it won four in a row from 1988 to 1991. United is also the league's most successful women's club, having won four premierships including a three-peat from 2006 to 2008. United home games are played at Central Park in Shepparton East.

Seven-time capped Australian international and ex-Portsmouth FC player Robert Enes hails from Shepparton and played for United. Former Oldham Athletic midfielder Kelvin Lomax and former Socceroos goalscorer Michael Curcija have also played for the club.

Shepparton South

Shepparton South is nicknamed "South" or "The Southerners" and plays in black and white stripes similar to Italian team Juventus.

South has won Four GNEFA premierships, a hat-trick from 1999 to 2001 and again in 2009 and 2010. South's recent success has come in junior grades, its under-17s won the division three times consecutively (2005–2007) It also won the under-12 boys and went unbeaten in the inaugural season of junior girls (under-14)in 2008. South home games are played at McEwen Reserve.

Steven Weir, formerly of Livingston FC and Cowdenbeath FC previously played at the club.

Their most notable product is Frankie Lagana, who played for Airdrie United in the Scottish Football League

Tatura

Tatura is nicknamed "The Ibises" and its home colours are red shirts and white shorts.

Tatura has won two GNEFA men's premierships, in 1980 and 1987. Tatura's home games are played at Frank Howley reserve. Tatura is also a regular host venue for the GNEFA grand final. Tatura is the club of the only current A-League player from the GNEFA; were Vince Lia of Wellington Phoenix played junior soccer.

Kyabram

Kyabram is nicknamed the "Go-Annas", a play on words inspired by a founding member of the club being named Anna and the Goanna animal.

Kyabram fields a women's team but does not have a men's division one team. Kyabram's home colours are orange and black.

Benalla

Benalla soccer club is a former men's premier of the GNEFA.

Benalla competed in Albury Wodonga Football Association from 1994 to 2008 before re-affiliating with the GNEFA in time for the 2009 season.

== Former clubs ==
Hanwood

Hanwood Soccer Club is from Griffith, New South Wales and was men's premier from 2004 to 2006.

Hanwood left the GNEFA citing a player numbers shortage and a lack of commitment to travelling three hours from Griffith to Shepparton for away games. The club officially left the league in early 2008.

Yoogali

Yoogali Soccer Club is from Griffith, New South Wales and is the arch rival of Hanwood.

Yoogali won numerous premierships in the men's and women's North Eastern Soccer League, including four in a row in the 1990s. Yoogali withdrew from the GNEFA in early 2008, citing a loss of almost its entire senior team to retirement, re-location, or a lack of commitment to the three hours' travel required to play away games in Shepparton and Tatura. Not helping the Yoogali players' commitment to the league was the controversial circumstances Shepparton defeated it under in the 2007 men's GNEFA grand final; the first documented case in Australian soccer history of a player already substituted off the park taking a penalty (for Shepparton) in the game-deciding shoot-out.

Wangaratta City

Wangaratta City Soccer Club had its origins traced back to 1951, when the largest employer in the town Bruck Textile Mills decided to enter a team into the B.D.S.F.A, in the first year they won the league and Cup. When the league evolved into the North East Soccer League Wangaratta was a main player in the league. Having a successful junior team in the 70's that transpired into a championship winning team in 1975. WCSC could see the writing on the wall however, the Shepparton based clubs were becoming more semi pro and the WCSC decided that their future lied in the border based competition of the Albury Wodonga Soccer Association. The club was granted access in 1977. The Wangaratta Club has grown to be the largest single sporting club in the City, fielding 15 teams each Sunday and had one of the largest stand alone mini roos programs in the state.

Year	Men's senior premier	Women's senior premier
1971	Cobram	
1972	Cobram	
1974	Lemnos	
1975	Wangaratta City	
1976	Cobram	
1977	Benalla	
1978	Cobram	
1979	Lemnos	
1980	Tatura	
1981	Lemnos	
1982	Lemnos	
1983	Lemnos	
1984	Lemnos	
1985	Lemnos	
1986	Shepparton United	
1987	Tatura	
1988	Shepparton United	
1989	Shepparton United	
1990	Shepparton United	
1991	Shepparton United	
1992	Yoogali	
1993	Yoogali	
1994	Yoogali	
1995	Yoogali	
1996	Shepparton	
1997	Shepparton	
1998	Shepparton United	
1999	Shepparton South	
2000	Shepparton South	
2001	Shepparton South	Hanwood
2002	Shepparton	Hanwood
2003	Shepparton	Yoogali
2004	Hanwood	Shepparton United
2005	Hanwood	Shepparton
2006	Hanwood	Shepparton United
2007	Shepparton	Shepparton United
2008	Shepparton	Shepparton United
2009	Shepparton South	Shepparton South
2010	Shepparton South	Shepparton United
2011	Tatura	
2012	Shepparton United	Shepparton United
2013	Shepparton United	Shepparton United
2014	Shepparton South	Shepparton South
2015	Shepparton South	Shepparton United
2016	Shepparton South	Shepparton United

== 2007 season ==
Shepparton won the 2007 men's premiership on penalties 8–7 after a 1–1 draw with Yoogali in the grand final at Tatura Park. Yoogali protested the result and had a replay ordered after their protest was upheld by a league tribunal. Shepparton then had the decision reversed at another appeal tribunal and was authorised as competition premier

Shepparton won the minor premiership with 46 competition points to Yoogali's 44. Yoogali won the qualifying final to advance to the grand final 4–3 at Deakin Reserve in Shepparton. Hanwood defeated Shepparton United 2–0 in the elimination final and hosted the preliminary final in Griffith, NSW against Shepparton. Shepparton won the preliminary final 1–0 to advance to a re-match with Yoogali in the grand final.

Competition best-and-fairest was Carl Fannon of Cobram. Top scorer was Stuart Vance of Shepparton with 22 goals in the regular season and three in finals for a total of 25.

Women's premiers were Shepparton United after an extra-time goal in the grand final against Tatura. United won back-to-back premierships with the 1–0 victory. United won the minor premiership with 51 points, scoring 110 goals, from Tatura on 43 points.

Competition best-and-fairest was Derya Tankrikulu of Tatura. Top scorer was Jess Theobald of Shepparton United with 39 goals in the regular season and two in the finals for a total of 41.

== 2008 season ==
Shepparton completed back-to-back premierships by defeating Cobram Victory 1–0 in the grand final at Tatura Park. The Reds won the minor premiership with 53 points from Cobram Victory on 48, but lost the qualifying final on penalties after a 2–2 draw. It meant Shepparton had to play Shepparton United in the preliminary final, United defeated Shepparton South on penalties in the elimination final after a 2–2 draw. Shepparton won the preliminary final against United 2–1 to advance to a re-match with Victory in the grand final. Competition top-scorer Stuart Vance scored the only goal in the grand final.

Competition best-and-fairest was Frank Bazzano of Cobram Victory. Top scorer was Stuart Vance of Shepparton with 26 goals in the regular season and three in the finals for a total of 29.

Women's premiers were Shepparton United after a 3–0 penalty shoot-out win against Cobram after a 1–1 draw in the grand final. United needed a late equaliser from competition top scorer Jess Theobald to send the game into extra time after trailing 1–0 for most of the game. The Blues had won the minor premiership with 60 points from Cobram on 43.

Competition best-and-fairest was Georgia Oudeman of Cobram Victory Top scorer was Jess Theobald of Shepparton United with 40 goals in the regular season and two in finals for a total of 42.

== 2009 season ==
Shepparton South won the GNEFA men's division one premiership by defeating Shepparton United 2–0 in the grand final at Tatura Park. South won the minor premiership wit 33 points to Shepparton United in second on 27. Back-to-back league top scorer Stuart Vance switched clubs, moving from Shepparton to Shepparton South at the start of the season. United finished second after a series of tribunals concerning its appeal of a 5–2 loss to Shepparton in the home and away season. The reversal of the 5–2 Shepparton win by the tribunal to a 3–0 United win meant the top four was Shepparton South 33, United 27, Shepparton 25 and Tatura 23. Shepparton eliminated Tatura 5–0 in the first week of finals, while South advanced direct to the grand final with a 1–0 win against United in the second week. United qualified for the grand final by defeating Shepparton 1–0 in the preliminary final. Second-half goals to Stuart Vance and Luke Nardella won the grand final 2–0 for Shepparton South.

Shepparton South's Connor Campbell won the league best and fairest, while Stuart Vance was top scorer with 22 goals in the home and away season and one goal in the grand final for a total of 23 for the season.

Women's premiers for the first time in league history were Shepparton South after a 1–0 grand final win against Shepparton United. The game's only goal was scored by Bonnie Kilmartin, a long and bouncing ball from midfield which was scrambled out of the goal mouth by United's defenders, but not before the referee's assistant had flagged for a goal. Amateur video footage and newspaper photographs showed the ball had crossed the line. Shepparton United had won the minor premiership with 34 points from South on 32, Shepparton on 30 and Tatura on 24. Tatura eliminated Shepparton on penalties in the first week of finals, while United advanced to the grand final with a 1–0 extra-time win against Shepparton South in week two. South defeated Tatura 1–0 in the preliminary final to set up the grand final re-match against United.

Competition best and fairest was Shepparton United's Holly Dimstas, while Cobram's Bianca Dikkenberg was top scorer with 15 goals.

== 2010 season ==
Shepparton South won the GNEFA men's grand final to complete back-to-back premierships after a 4–2 penalty shoot-out win against Tatura. Scores after regular and extra time were 0–0. Victory gave South its fifth senior men's premiership. Key moments in the game included a first-half save by Tatura goalkeeper Stephen Sellwood from South's Joel Aitken, goal ruled offside for Tatura in stoppage time of regular time, and a save from South goalkeeper Robbie Taylor from Tatura's Cody Sellwood in the last minute of extra time. Taylor saved one penalty in the shoot-out and Tatura missed another kick, while South scored all four of its penalties.

Shepparton South were minor premiers with 34 points from Tatura (28), Shepparton (27) and Cobram Victory (22). Shepparton 4 d Victory 2 in elimination final, Shepparton South 0 lt Tatura 1 in qualifying final, Shepparton South 1 d Shepparton 0 in prelim final.

Best and fairest and competition top scorer was Cobram Victory's Craig Carley, he scored 30 goals.

Women's premiers were Shepparton United after a 6–0 win against Shepparton South in the grand final. Victory gave United its fifth senior women's premiership. Scorers in the final were Megan Carr (2), Amanda Lawless, Tiarna Meka and two own goals. The score was 2–0 at half time. Statistics announced on the match DVD suggest United had 31 shots on goal.

Shepparton United were minor premiers with 42 points from Tatura (40), South (33) and Numurkah (24). Shepparton South 3 d Numurkah 1 in elimination final, Shepparton United 3 d Tatura 1 in qualifying final, Tatura 0 lt Shepparton South 1 in preliminary final.

Best and fairest was Cobram Victory's Imogen Head, while Shepparton United's Leanne Rawson scored 34 goals in the regular season and one in finals for a total of 35.

Men's division two premiers were Kialla United, under-16s Shepparton, girls under-15s Shepparton South, under-14s Shepparton South and under-12s Shepparton South.

== Media ==
Daily newspaper Shepparton News is the main source of GNEFA news, while Prime Television and WIN Television preview and review match rounds. Radio stations such as 3SR (FM 95.3) and 3ONE (FM 98.5) also have shows with regular segments that discuss the league.
