= Goulburn Valley Suns FC =

Goulburn Valley Suns
- Full name: Goulburn Valley Suns Football Club
- Nickname: Suns
- Founded: 2013; 13 years ago
- Ground: John McEwen Reserve
- Capacity: 3,200
- Chairman: Rob Stojanovski
- League: Victoria Premier League 2
- 2026: 1st of 14 (promoted) VPL 1
- Website: http://www.gvsuns.com.au/
| Home colours | Away colours |

Goulburn Valley Suns are a semi-professional soccer club based in Shepparton, Victoria. The club was established in 2013 and currently competes in the Victoria Premier League 2. The Suns' home ground is John McEwen Reserve.

== History ==
For the club's first season of competition, the Suns signed a number of high-profile players, including Simon Colosimo, Naum Sekulovski, Kristian Sarkies and Melbourne City FC youth trio Ersin Kaya, Hernan Espindola and Stipo Andrijasevic. Goulburn Valley Suns lost its first official match, going down 1–0 to Oakleigh Cannons FC at John McEwen Reserve. The Suns lost their next five leagues games, before managing their first points and first win in the National Premier Leagues Victoria, when they defeated Werribee City 2–1. GV Suns finished the season in bottom place, managing 10 points in 26 games.

As a result of the club's 14th place in 2014, they were relegated to National Premier Leagues Victoria 1, which, for 2015, was separated into an Eastern and Western conference with GVS competing in the Eastern conference. The Suns lost a number of key players, including Colosimo, Sarkies and Ben Clarke. Inconsistent form resulted in the Suns finishing the season in 5th place in the 10-team league. Prolific striker Craig Carley won the NPL Victoria 2 golden boot, scoring 34 goals.

On 2 May 2016, striker Carley left the club to join Hume City. Carley had been the Suns' top goalscorer, with six goals at the time of his departure. The Suns moved quickly to replace Carley, announcing the signing of former Central Coast Mariners player Daniel Heffernan on 21 May 2016. GVS finished the season in 8th place.

The 2017 season saw improved results for Goulburn Valley, who finished in 4th place. In 2019, teenager Alou Kuol won the NPL2 Golden Boot scoring 22 goals in 26 games.

The 2020 season was cancelled due to the COVID-19 pandemic in Australia before a match was played. The 2021 season was suspended after 14 rounds and subsequently cancelled following Victorian government lockdown measures due to the pandemic. The Suns were in 4th position on the NPL2 ladder when the season was suspended.

In 2022, the Suns managed just four points all season, unable to secure a win in 22 games and finished in bottom place, meaning relegation to the third-tier Victorian soccer competition NPL Victoria 3 ensued for 2023.

== Home ground ==
The home ground of Goulburn Valley Suns FC is John McEwen Reserve, also known as Shepparton Sports Precinct. It is a $21 million multi-sport facility with four full-size soccer pitches.

== Current squad ==
Note: Flags indicate national team as defined under FIFA eligibility rules; some limited exceptions apply. Players may hold more than one non-FIFA nationality.

| No. | Pos. | Nation | Player |
|---|---|---|---|
| — | | | Hammad Agog |
| — | | | Muntadhar Al Gazaly |
| — | | | Harun Aktas |
| — | | | Zac Balaburov |
| — | | | Craig Carley |
| — | | | Shane Dunne |
| — | | | Jamie England |
| — | | | Adam Gatcum |
| — | | | Fraser Gosstray |
| — | | | Liam Kielty |

| No. | Pos. | Nation | Player |
|---|---|---|---|
| — | | | James Lelliot |
| — | | | Matthew Lelliott |
| — | | | Jacob Lever |
| — | | | Billy Marshall |
| — | | | David Musafari |
| — | | | Jordan Montagner |
| — | | | Greg Nash |
| — | | | Shogo Osowa |
| — | | | Vani Shamoon |
| — | | | Bradly Wilson |
