= Darebin International Sports Centre =

Athletic facility in Thornbury, Victoria

Coordinates: 37°45′53″S 145°1′26″E

- Darebin Velodrome
- Interactive map of Darebin International Sports Centre
- Location: Thornbury, Victoria
- Capacity: 1250

Construction
- Opened: 2005

The Darebin International Sports Centre (DISC) is an athletic facility in Thornbury, Victoria, Australia. DISC is the home of the State Lawn Bowls Centre, the State Cycling Centre and the State Football Centre.

DISC hosted the 2006 Commonwealth Games for Lawn Bowls.

DISC has three football pitches with synthetic turf surfaces. The pitches are used by club football teams, the National Training Camp and State Football teams.
