= Victorian Premier League Men's =

- Organising body: Football Victoria
- Founded: 2023; 3 years ago
- Country: Australia
- State: Victoria
- Confederation: Asian Football Confederation
- Divisions: 2
- Number of clubs: 28
- Promotion to: National Premier Leagues Victoria Men's
- Relegation to: Victorian State League Men's
- Domestic cup(s): National; Australia Cup; State; Dockerty Cup
- Current champions: Melbourne Knights (VPL 1) (2026); Goulburn Valley Suns (VPL 2) (2026)
- Current: VPL 1 (2026), VPL 2 (2026)

The Victorian Premier League Men's (VPLM) is an Australian men's soccer league based in Victoria. It is administered by Football Victoria, and represents the second and third-highest tiers in the Victorian soccer league system. The VPL consists of two divisions (VPLM 1 and VPLM 2), with promotion from VPLM 1 to the National Premier Leagues Men's (NPLM) and relegation from VPLM 2 to the Victorian State League Men's (VSL).

== History ==
Following the introduction of the National Premier Leagues (NPL) for the 2014 season, Football Federation Victoria (FFV) introduced a second-tier NPL 1 competition. It was renamed to NPL 2 in 2016 and split into two zones (east and west). A further change occurred in 2020, with the establishment of NPL 3 as the third-tier competition in the Victorian soccer pyramid.

In October 2023, Football Victoria renamed NPL 2 and NPL 3 to VPL 1 and VPL 2 respectively, using the name "Victorian Premier League" name previously used by the first division in Victoria.

== Format ==
As of the 2025 season, the VPL first and second divisions are contested by 14 teams each. The top two finishing clubs in VPL 1 gain automatic promotion to the NPL, while those clubs finishing in positions third-to-sixth compete in play-offs for a promotion berth.

The bottom three teams in VPL 1 at the conclusion of the season are relegated to VPL 2, and the bottom three teams in VPL 2 are relegated to the Victorian State League first division.

== Current members ==
The following clubs will take part in the 2026 Victorian Premier League season.

=== Division 1 ===
\
Locations of 2026 VPL 1 clubs within metropolitan Melbourne.

Team	Location	Stadium	Capacity
Brunswick City	Brunswick West	Dunstan Reserve	1,000
Brunswick Juventus	Fawkner	CB Smith Reserve	2,000
Bulleen Lions	Bulleen	David Barro Stadium	3,000
Eltham Redbacks	Eltham North	Eltham North Reserve	1,000
Langwarrin	Langwarrin South	Lawton Park Reserve	5,000
Manningham United Blues	Templestowe	Pettys Reserve	1,000
Melbourne Knights	Sunshine North	Knights Stadium	15,000
Melbourne Srbija	Burnley	Kevin Bartlett Reserve	2,500
Melbourne Victory	Bundoora	The Home of the Matildas	3,000
Northcote City	Thornbury	John Cain Memorial Park	5,000
North Geelong Warriors	Lara	Elcho Park	5,000
North Sunshine Eagles	St Albans	Larisa Reserve	1,000
Port Melbourne	Port Melbourne	SS Anderson Reserve	1,000
Western United	Tarneit	Wyndham Regional Football Facility	5,000

=== Division 2 ===
Locations of 2026 VPL 2 clubs within metropolitan Melbourne.

Club	Location	Grounds	Capacity
Altona City	Altona	HC Kim Reserve	1,000
Bayside Argonauts	Cheltenham	Shipston Reserve	500
Box Hill United	Box Hill	Wembley Park	1,000
Eastern Lions	Burwood	Gardiners Reserve	1,500
Essendon Royals	Essendon	Cross Keys Reserve	500
Goulburn Valley Suns	Shepparton	John McEwan Reserve	3,200
Keilor Park	Keilor Park	Keilor Park Recreation Reserve	1,000
Kingston City	Clayton South	The Grange Reserve	2,000
Malvern City	Kooyong	Sir Zelman Cowen Reserve	500
Moreland City	Coburg	Campbell Reserve	1,000
Nunawading City	Forest Hill	Mahoney's Reserve	1,000
Springvale White Eagles	Keysborough	Serbian Sports Centre	5,000
Werribee City	Werribee	Galvin Park Reserve	1,000
Whittlesea United	Epping	Epping Stadium	10,000

== Champions ==
Season	Division 1	Division 2
2024	Melbourne Victory Youth	Melbourne Srbija
2025	Bentleigh Greens	North Geelong Warriors
2026	Melbourne Knights	Goulburn Valley Suns

== See also ==
- National Premier Leagues Victoria
- Victorian State League
