= 2027 National Premier Leagues Victoria Men's =

National Premier Leagues Victoria
- Season: 2027
- Dates: 5 February – 12 September 2026
- Teams: 14
- All statistics correct as of 11 October 2026.

The 2027 National Premier Leagues Victoria season will be the 119th season of top-flight Victorian football, and the 14th since the competition was re-badged to National Premier Leagues Victoria. The season will begin on the first week of February 2027, and will end in September 2027.

Oakleigh Cannons are the defending premiers after finishing five points clear of second-placed Hume City, but were defeated on penalties to Avondale FC in the 2026 grand final.

== Teams ==
The following teams changed division from the 2026 NPL Victoria season.

=== To NPL Victoria ===
- Melbourne Knights
- Brunswick Juventus
- Northcote City

=== From NPL Victoria ===
- Bentleigh Greens
- Green Gully
- Dandenong Thunder

=== Stadiums and Locations ===
Locations of 2027 NPL Victoria clubs within metropolitan Melbourne

Team	Head Coach	Location	Stadium	Capacity
Altona Magic	Goran Lozanovski (Note: Goran Lozanovski is currently suspended for the first five matches of the 2027 season, due to an incident with a referee in the 2026 season.)	Melbourne (Altona North)	Paisley Park	5,000
Avondale FC	Siniša Cohadzić	Melbourne (Parkville)	Avenger Park	1,000
Brunswick Juventus	Anthony Barbieri	Melbourne (Fawkner)	CB Smith Reserve	2,000
Caroline Springs George Cross	Eric Vassiliadis	Melbourne (Fraser Rise)	City Vista Recreation Reserve	3,000
Dandenong City	Nick Tolios	Melbourne (Endeavour Hills)	Frank Holohan Soccer Complex	4,000
Northcote City	Max Clarke	Melbourne (Thornbury)	John Cain Memorial Park	5,000
Heidelberg United	John Anastasiadis	Melbourne (Heidelberg West)	Olympic Village	12,000
Hume City	Nick Hegarty	Melbourne (Broadmeadows)	Hume City Stadium	3,000
Melbourne City Youth	Alessandro Diamanti	Melbourne (Cranbourne East)	City Football Academy	1,500
Melbourne Knights	Michael Callandrella	Melbourne (Sunshine North)	Knights Stadium	15,000
Oakleigh Cannons	Chris Taylor	Melbourne (Oakleigh)	Jack Edwards Reserve	4,000
Preston Lions	Zoran Markovski	Melbourne (Reservoir)	B.T. Connor Reserve	6,500
South Melbourne	Jamie Reed	Melbourne (Albert Park)	Lakeside Stadium	12,000
St Albans Saints	Cameron Watson	Melbourne (St Albans)	Churchill Reserve	3,500

== Regular season ==
=== League Table ===
Pos	Team	Pld	W	D	L	GF	GA	GD	Pts	Promotion, qualification or relegation
1	Altona Magic	0	0	0	0	0	0	0	0	Qualification to Australian Championship and Finals series
2	Avondale FC (Note: Team pre-qualified to the Australian Championship as a foundation club.)	0	0	0	0	0	0	0	0	Qualification to Finals series
3	Brunswick Juventus	0	0	0	0	0	0	0	0	Qualification to Finals series
4	Caroline Springs George Cross	0	0	0	0	0	0	0	0	Qualification to Finals series
5	Dandenong City	0	0	0	0	0	0	0	0	Qualification to Finals series
6	Heidelberg United	0	0	0	0	0	0	0	0	Qualification to Finals series
7	Hume City	0	0	0	0	0	0	0	0	
8	Melbourne City Youth (Note: Team is ineligible to qualify for the 2027 Australian Championship as the youth team of an A-League club.)	0	0	0	0	0	0	0	0	
9	Melbourne Knights	0	0	0	0	0	0	0	0	
10	Northcote City	0	0	0	0	0	0	0	0	
11	Oakleigh Cannons	0	0	0	0	0	0	0	0	
12	Preston Lions	0	0	0	0	0	0	0	0	Relegation to Victorian Premier League 1
13	South Melbourne	0	0	0	0	0	0	0	0	Relegation to Victorian Premier League 1
14	St Albans Saints	0	0	0	0	0	0	0	0	Relegation to Victorian Premier League 1

First match(es) will be played: 5 February 2027. Source: Football Victoria
Rules for classification: 1) points; 2) goal difference; 3) number of goals scored; 4) aggregate head-to-head results; 5) away goals; 6) alphabetical order/coin toss at the end of the season.
