= 2026 Australian Championship =

2026 of the Australian Championship

Australian Championship
- Season: 2026
- Dates: 15 October – 13 December
- Matches: 16
- Goals: 37 (2.31 per match)
- Top goalscorer: Jarred Baker; Daniel Bressan; Chris Jackson; Michael Ruhs (2 goals each)
- Highest attendance: 4,163 (South Melbourne v Sydney United 58; 23 Oct)
- Lowest attendance: 511 (Sydney Olympic v Bayswater City; 25 Oct)
- Total attendance: 27,734
- Average attendance: 1,733
- All statistics correct as of 25 October 2026.

The 2026 Australian Championship is the second edition of the Australian Championship, a national second-tier soccer competition for men, held after the finish of the 2026 National Premier Leagues Men's season. The tournament consists of six home-and-away matches in four groups for teams in the group stage, culminating in a knockout finals series, running from 16 October and concluding on 12–13 December.

South Melbourne are the defending champions, after defeating Marconi Stallions in the final of the 2025 Australian Championship.

== Teams ==
Locations of clubs in Sydney and Wollongong (top), Melbourne (middle), and the rest of Australia (bottom).

● Foundation clubs, ● NPL qualifiers

Sixteen clubs are participating in the competition. Eight clubs gained automatic qualification as the competition's Foundation clubs, while the other eight qualified via the 2026 National Premier Leagues Men's competitions, as premiers of their respective leagues. As the top three teams in the 2026 NPL NSW had already qualified as foundation clubs, the berth went to the league's fourth-placed team Sutherland Sharks instead.

Qualified as	Team	City	Home ground	Cap.
Foundation clubs	Avondale FC	Melbourne	Avenger Park	2,500
Foundation clubs	Marconi Stallions	Sydney	Marconi Stadium	9,000
Foundation clubs	Preston Lions	Melbourne	B.T. Connor Reserve	9,000
Foundation clubs	South Melbourne	Melbourne	Lakeside Stadium	12,000
Foundation clubs	Sydney Olympic	Sydney	Sydney Olympic Park Athletic Centre	5,000
Foundation clubs	Sydney United 58	Sydney	Sydney United Sports Centre	12,000
Foundation clubs	Wests APIA	Sydney	Lambert Park	7,000
Foundation clubs	Wollongong Wolves	Wollongong	Macedonia Park, Berkeley	5,000
NPL SA Premiers	Adelaide City	Adelaide	Adelaide City Park	5,000
NPL WA Premiers	Bayswater City	Perth	Frank Drago Reserve	5,000
NPL Northern NSW Premiers	Broadmeadow Magic	Newcastle	Magic Park	3,500
NPL Capital Football Premiers	Canberra Croatia	Canberra	Deakin Stadium	1,500
NPL Queensland Premiers	Lions FC	Brisbane	Lions Stadium	5,000
NPL Victoria Premiers	Oakleigh Cannons	Melbourne	Jack Edwards Reserve	4,000
NPL Tasmania Premiers	South Hobart	Hobart	D'Arcy Street	1,500
NPL NSW Fourth place	Sutherland Sharks	Sydney	Seymour Shaw Park	5,000

== Group stage ==
The draw for the group stage was made on 4 September 2026. Subsequently, Football Australia changed the format for the group stage games, where drawn games will proceed directly to a penalty shootout (without extra time), where the winner of the shootout receives two points, while the losing side receives a single point.

=== Group A ===
Pos	Team	Pld	W	PKW	PKL	L	GF	GA	GD	Pts		SMB	SUD	STS	CBR
1	South Melbourne	6	3	2	0	1	9	4	+5	13	Finals series	—	1–1	0–0	5–2
2	Sydney United 58	6	3	1	1	1	8	5	+3	12	Finals series	1–0	—	2–0	1–1
3	Sutherland Sharks	6	2	0	1	3	6	5	+1	7		0–1	1–2	—	3–0
4	Canberra Croatia	6	1	0	1	4	5	14	−9	4		0–2	2–1	0–2	—

Source: Football Australia
Legend: Blue = home team win; Yellow = draw; Red = away team win.

17 October 1	Sutherland Sharks	0–1	South Melbourne	Sydney
14:00 (AEDT)		Report	Uchida 46'	Stadium: Seymour Shaw Park; Attendance: 3,167; Referee: Nathan Shakespear

18 October 1	Sydney United	1–1 (8–7 p)	Canberra Croatia	Sydney
15:00 (AEDT)	McGing 62'	Report	Katsoulis 54'	Stadium: Edensor Park; Attendance: 3,872; Referee: Tom Dale
	Penalties
	Rule (penalty scored); El-Sabeh (penalty scored); Perkatis (penalty scored); Lardieri (penalty missed); Ozanić (penalty scored); Cop (penalty scored); Vlastelica (penalty scored); Nakano (penalty scored); Wada (penalty scored)		(penalty scored) Celis; (penalty scored) De Oliveira; (penalty scored) McGowan; (penalty scored) Whitehead; (penalty missed) Spaseski; (penalty scored) Gaspari; (penalty scored) Sutomo; (penalty scored) Katsoulis; (penalty missed) Seselja

23 October 2	South Melbourne	1–1 (5–4 p)	Sydney United 58	Melbourne
18:30 (AEDT)	Swibel 48' (pen.)	Report	Wells 39' (pen.)	Stadium: Lakeside Stadium; Attendance: 4,163; Referee: Nathan Shakespear
	Penalties
	Janković (penalty scored); Pasquali (penalty scored); Juach (penalty scored); Eliopoulos (penalty missed); Mikkola (penalty scored); Giannakopoulos (penalty scored)		(penalty missed) De Oliveira; (penalty scored) Krslovic; (penalty scored) Rule; (penalty scored) El-Sabeh; (penalty scored) Wells; (penalty missed) Cop

24 October 2	Canberra Croatia	0–2	Sutherland Sharks	Canberra
16:00 (AEDT)		Report	Harb 2'; Sattout 72' (pen.)	Stadium: Deakin Stadium; Attendance: 855; Referee: Jonathan Barreiro

29 October 3	Canberra Croatia	0–2	South Melbourne	Canberra
18:30 (AEDT)		Report	Swibel 28'; Giannakopoulos 76'	Stadium: Deakin Stadium; Attendance: 1,053

31 October 3	Sutherland Sharks	1–2	Sydney United 58	Sydney
14:00 (AEDT)	Harbas 52'	Report	Wells 24'; El-Sabeh 90+4'	Stadium: Seymour Shaw Park; Attendance: 2,538

6 November 4	Canberra Croatia	2–1	Sydney United 58	Canberra
19:30 (AEDT)	Gaspari 6'; Colbertaldo 60'	Report	Koko 45+1'	Stadium: Deakin Stadium; Attendance: 1,452; Referee: Nathan Shakespear

7 November 4	South Melbourne	0–0 (6–5 p)	Sutherland Sharks	Melbourne
19:30 (AEDT)		Report		Stadium: Lakeside Stadium; Attendance: 3,256; Referee: Noah Moss
	Penalties
	Janković (penalty scored); Swibel (penalty scored); Pasquali (penalty missed); Mesourouni (penalty scored); Retre (penalty scored); Uchida (penalty scored); Painter-Andrews (penalty scored)		(penalty scored) Harb; (penalty missed) Yokokawa; (penalty scored) Matthews; (penalty scored) Sattout; (penalty scored) Bonilla; (penalty scored) Perez; (penalty missed) Casella

14 November 5	Sydney United 58	1–0	South Melbourne	Sydney
15:00 (AEDT)	Jennings 63'	Report		Stadium: Sydney United Sports Centre; Attendance: 1,600; Referee: Declan Woods

15 November 5	Sutherland Sharks	3–0	Canberra Croatia	Sydney
15:00 (AEDT)	Spaseski 7' (o.g.); Harbas 69', 89'	Report		Stadium: Seymour Shaw Park; Attendance: 2,239; Referee: Charlotte Flynn

20 November 6	South Melbourne	5–2	Canberra Croatia	Melbourne
19:30 (AEDT)	Yoo 22'; Lampard 27'; Grbesa 43' (o.g.); Uchida 46'; Cocks 62'	Report	Whitehead 4'; Katsoulis 25'	Stadium: Lakeside Stadium; Attendance: 1,593; Referee: Jock Quartermain

20 November 6	Sydney United 58	2–0	Sutherland Sharks	Sydney
19:30 (AEDT)	Wells 81'; El-Sabeh 88'	Report		Stadium: Sydney United Sports Centre; Referee: Sam Kelly

=== Group B ===
Pos	Team	Pld	W	PKW	PKL	L	GF	GA	GD	Pts		BRD	APL	AVO	ADL
1	Broadmeadow Magic	6	4	1	0	1	13	7	+6	14	Finals series	—	0–0	2–1	3–2
2	Wests APIA	6	4	0	1	1	14	6	+8	13	Finals series	2–1	—	5–2	3–0
3	Avondale FC	6	2	1	0	3	10	13	−3	8		1–2	2–1	—	2–1
4	Adelaide City	6	0	0	1	5	7	18	−11	1		1–5	1–3	2–2	—

Source: Football Australia
Legend: Blue = home team win; Yellow = draw; Red = away team win.

16 October 1	Adelaide City	2–2 (6–7 p)	Avondale FC	Adelaide
18:30 (ACDT)	Bressan 53' (pen.), 70' (pen.)	Report	Carpenter 66'; Joseph 74'	Stadium: Adelaide City Park; Attendance: 1,408; Referee: Adam Bavcar
	Penalties
	Bucco (penalty scored); Mori (penalty scored); Kitano (penalty scored); O'Neil (penalty scored); Parhas (penalty missed); Kasumovic (penalty scored); Western (penalty scored); Abetew (penalty missed)		(penalty scored) Ninkovich; (penalty scored) Joseph; (penalty scored) Sotirio; (penalty scored) Kojima; (penalty missed) Trajceski; (penalty scored) Lesiotis; (penalty scored) Green; (penalty scored) Traoré

17 October 1	Broadmeadow Magic	0–0 (4–3 p)	Wests APIA	Newcastle
14:00 (AEDT)		Report		Stadium: Magic Park; Attendance: 653; Referee: Sam Kelly
	Penalties
	Cresnar (penalty missed); Simmons (penalty scored); Badger (penalty scored); Heigl (penalty scored); Cresnar (penalty scored)		(penalty missed) Konestabo; (penalty scored) Denmead; (penalty scored) Scott; (penalty scored) Shaw; (penalty missed) Caspers

23 October 2	Adelaide City	1–3	Wests APIA	Adelaide
18:30 (ACDT)	Kasumovic 73'	Report	Monge 2'; Segreto 65'; Hedley 88'	Stadium: Adelaide City Park; Attendance: 1,019; Referee: Ben Abraham

24 October 2	Avondale FC	1–2	Broadmeadow Magic	Melbourne
14:00 (AEDT)	Joseph 19'	Report	Baker 4' (pen.), 80'	Stadium: Avenger Park; Attendance: 1,002; Referee: Lucas Mattia

30 October 3	Broadmeadow Magic	3–2	Adelaide City	Newcastle
18:30 (AEDT)	Palombini 12'; Delgardo 74'; Wells 75'	Report	Schimizzi 77'; O'Neil 87'	Stadium: Magic Park; Attendance: 704

1 November 3	Wests APIA	5–2	Avondale FC	Sydney
14:00 (AEDT)	Konestabo 8'; Kambayashi 47'; Walters 70'; Stewart 85'; Hedley 88'	Report	Kojima 22'; Joseph 39'	Stadium: Lambert Park; Attendance: 1,329; Referee: Tom Fell

7 November 4	Wests APIA	2–1	Broadmeadow Magic	Sydney
15:00 (AEDT)	Walters 29'; Segreto 74'	Report	Smith 53'	Stadium: Lambert Park; Attendance: 1,440; Referee: Charlie Hollings

8 November 4	Avondale FC	2–1	Adelaide City	Melbourne
15:00 (AEDT)	Sotirio 87', 90+1'	Report	Bressan 66'	Stadium: Avenger Park; Attendance: 2,120; Referee: Mackenzie Janes

12 November 5	Wests APIA	3–0	Adelaide City	Sydney
19:30 (AEDT)	Segreto 1', 18'; Hedley 62'	Report		Stadium: Lambert Park; Attendance: 1,802; Referee: Eric Saba

15 November 5	Broadmeadow Magic	2–1	Avondale FC	Newcastle
15:00 (AEDT)	Delgardo 55'; Smith 80'	Report	Joseph 38'	Stadium: Magic Park; Attendance: 410; Referee: Michael Ouliaris

22 November 6	Adelaide City	1–5	Broadmeadow Magic	Adelaide
15:00 (AEDT)	Bressan 3' (pen.)	Report	Delgardo 74'; Smith 33'; Wells 58', 59'; Badger 74'	Stadium: Adelaide City Park; Referee: Tom Brinkworth

22 November 6	Avondale FC	2–1	Wests APIA	Melbourne
15:00 (AEDT)	Joseph 4'; Trajceski 90'	Report	Konestabo 60'	Stadium: Avenger Park; Referee: Declan Woods

=== Group C ===
Pos	Team	Pld	W	PKW	PKL	L	GF	GA	GD	Pts		BAY	OAK	MAR	OLY
1	Bayswater City	6	4	0	1	1	13	8	+5	13	Finals series	—	0–0	3–1	2–1
2	Oakleigh Cannons	6	3	1	2	0	12	6	+6	13	Finals series	4–2	—	2–2	4–2
3	Marconi Stallions	6	1	2	0	3	8	13	−5	7		1–4	0–0	—	2–1
4	Sydney Olympic	6	1	0	0	5	8	14	−6	3		1–2	0–2	3–2	—

Source: Football Australia
Legend: Blue = home team win; Yellow = draw; Red = away team win.

16 October 1	Oakleigh Cannons	4–2	Sydney Olympic	Melbourne
18:30 (AEDT)	Guest 14'; Salmon 30'; Boyce 83'; Knowles 90'	Report	Ruhs 9', 59'	Stadium: Jack Edwards Reserve; Attendance: 1,624; Referee: Michael Ouliaris

17 October 1	Bayswater City	3–1	Marconi Stallions	Perth
18:30 (AWST)	Loughrey 19'; Dau 61'; Teece 81'	Report	Tsekenis 32'	Stadium: Frank Drago Reserve; Attendance: 1,236; Referee: Jonathan Barreiro

24 October 2	Marconi Stallions	0–0 (8–7 p)	Oakleigh Cannons	Sydney
14:00 (AEDT)		Report		Stadium: Marconi Stadium; Attendance: 1,221; Referee: Eric Saba
	Penalties
	Glasson (penalty scored); Elhelou (penalty scored); Blair (penalty missed); Daniel (penalty missed); Wright (penalty scored); Burnie (penalty scored); de Robillard (penalty scored); Anderson (penalty scored); Mlinaric (penalty scored); Windust (penalty scored)		(penalty scored) Guest; (penalty scored) Boyce; (penalty scored) Duratovic; (penalty missed) Georgiou; (penalty missed) Lebib; (penalty scored) Martin; (penalty scored) Forde; (penalty scored) Leonard; (penalty scored) Hampson; (penalty missed) Strong

25 October 2	Sydney Olympic	1–2	Bayswater City	Sydney
14:00 (AEDT)	Najjar 90+7'	Report	Jackson 16', 32'	Stadium: Sydney Olympic Park Athletic Centre; Attendance: 511; Referee: Tom Fell

30 October 3	Sydney Olympic	3–2	Marconi Stallions	Sydney
18:30 (AEDT)	Ruhs 15', 23'; Mostofi 73'	Report	de Robillard 64'; Tsekenis 89'	Stadium: Sydney Olympic Park Athletic Centre; Attendance: 523; Referee: Noah Moss

1 November 3	Bayswater City	0–0 (2–4 p)	Oakleigh Cannons	Perth
17:00 (AWST)		Report		Stadium: Frank Drago Reserve; Attendance: 1,134; Referee: Michael Ouliaris
	Penalties
	Hughes (penalty missed); Dau (penalty scored); La Galia (penalty missed); Loughrey (penalty scored)		(penalty scored) Guest; (penalty scored) Sinclair; (penalty scored) Martin; (penalty scored) Sulemani

5 November 4	Sydney Olympic	0–2	Oakleigh Cannons	Sydney
19:30 (AEDT)		Report	Sulemani 18'; Lebib 50'	Stadium: Sydney Olympic Park Athletic Centre; Attendance: 450; Referee: Tom Dale

7 November 4	Marconi Stallions	1–4	Bayswater City	Sydney
15:00 (AEDT)	Armson 90+4'	Report	Dau 26'; Teece 37'; Jackson 80'; Loughrey 88'	Stadium: Marconi Stadium; Attendance: 943; Referee: Eric Saba

13 November 5	Oakleigh Cannons	2–2 (5–6 p)	Marconi Stallions	Melbourne
19:30 (AEDT)	Leonard 43'; Boyce 63'	Report	de Robillard 8'; Windust 26'	Stadium: Jack Edwards Reserve; Attendance: 1,132; Referee: Sophie Allum
	Penalties
	Salmon (penalty missed); Boyce (penalty scored); Martin (penalty scored); Leonard (penalty scored); Guest (penalty scored); Sinclair (penalty scored); Forde (penalty missed)		(penalty scored) Glasson; (penalty scored) Elhelou; (penalty scored) Burnie; (penalty missed) Wright; (penalty scored) Maya; (penalty scored) Daniel; (penalty scored) Mlinaric

14 November 5	Bayswater City	2–1	Sydney Olympic	Perth
16:30 (AWST)	La Galia 6'; Teece 13'	Report	Ruhs 36'	Stadium: Frank Drago Reserve; Attendance: 871; Referee: Lucas Mattia

21 November 6	Oakleigh Cannons	4–2	Bayswater City	Melbourne
15:00 (AEDT)	Sulemani 20'; Salmon 44'; Lebib 90'; Forde 90+5'	Report	Teece 7', 25'	Stadium: Jack Edwards Reserve; Referee: Adam Bavcar

21 November 6	Marconi Stallions	2–1	Sydney Olympic	Sydney
15:00 (AEDT)	Maya 54'; Armson 69'	Report	Ruhs 41'	Stadium: Marconi Stadium; Referee: Nicolas McKay

=== Group D ===
Pos	Team	Pld	W	PKW	PKL	L	GF	GA	GD	Pts		PRE	LIO	WOL	SHO
1	Preston Lions	6	4	0	1	1	14	5	+9	13	Finals series	—	3–1	0–0	6–0
2	Lions FC	6	3	1	0	2	12	10	+2	11	Finals series	2–1	—	1–1	1–2
3	Wollongong Wolves	6	2	1	1	2	9	7	+2	9		1–2	1–3	—	2–0
4	South Hobart	6	1	0	0	5	6	19	−13	3		1–2	2–4	1–4	—

Source: Football Australia
Legend: Blue = home team win; Yellow = draw; Red = away team win.

15 October 1	Preston Lions	0–0 (5–6 p)	Wollongong Wolves	Melbourne
19:30 (AEDT)		Report		Stadium: BT Connor Reserve; Attendance: 3,928; Referee: Ben Abraham
	Penalties
	Tevere (penalty missed); Cianci (penalty scored); Kur (penalty scored); Gueli (penalty scored); Romanovski (penalty scored); Edwards (penalty scored); Mihailidis (penalty missed)		(penalty scored) Yamamura; (penalty missed) N. Duarte; (penalty scored) Massiovecchio; (penalty scored) Ball; (penalty scored) Kanaizumi; (penalty scored) Hernandez; (penalty scored) Beattie

18 October 1	Lions FC	1–2	South Hobart	Brisbane
18:00 (AEST)	Hore 34'	Report	Spang 28'; Kemp 36'	Stadium: Lions Stadium; Attendance: 839; Referee: Sophie Allum

22 October 2	Lions FC	2–1	Preston Lions	Brisbane
18:30 (AEST)	Lagos 73'; Carlos 83'	Report	Blazevic 49'	Stadium: Lions Stadium; Attendance: 732; Referee: Casey Reibelt

25 October 2	Wollongong Wolves	2–0	South Hobart	Wollongong
14:00 (AEDT)	Masciovecchio 32'; Madden 35'	Report		Stadium: Macedonia Park; Attendance: 1,504; Referee: Noah Moss

31 October 3	South Hobart	1–2	Preston Lions	Hobart
14:00 (AEDT)	Lancaster 64'	Report	Bonada 4'; Brooks 30'	Stadium: D'Arcy Street; Attendance: 705; Referee: Jock Quartermain

31 October 3	Wollongong Wolves	1–3	Lions FC	Wollongong
14:00 (AEDT)	Scott 54'	Report	Ludwik 59'; Pope 79'; Hore 88'	Stadium: Macedonia Park; Attendance: 1,268; Referee: Rowan Fisher

7 November 4	Wollongong Wolves	1–2	Preston Lions	Wollongong
17:00 (AEDT)	Hernandez 57'	Report	Markovski 78'; Lazarevski 89'	Stadium: Macedonia Park; Attendance: 2,220; Referee: Declan Woods

8 November 4	South Hobart	2–4	Lions FC	Hobart
15:00 (AEDT)	Beltran-Woodward 89'; Kemp 90+2'	Report	L. Ponting 37'; Debele 54'; Feitchner 76'; Akbari 81'	Stadium: D'Arcy Street; Attendance: 871; Referee: Rowan Fisher

13 November 5	Preston Lions	3–1	Lions FC	Melbourne
19:30 (AEDT)	Brooks 16', 79'; Bonada 22'	Report	Broderick 9'	Stadium: B.T. Connor Reserve; Attendance: 3,123; Referee: Noah Moss

14 November 5	South Hobart	1–4	Wollongong Wolves	Hobart
15:00 (AEDT)	Kemp 7'	Report	Massiovecchio 12'; De Jesus 17'; Fujita 27'; Scott 38'	Stadium: D'Arcy Street; Attendance: 630; Referee: Tom Fell

19 November 6	Lions FC	1–1 (5–3 p)	Wollongong Wolves	Brisbane
19:30 (AEDT)	Lagos 56'	Report	Scott 54'	Stadium: Lions Stadium; Attendance: 550; Referee: Jack Powers
	Penalties
	North (penalty scored); Pope (penalty scored); L. Ponting (penalty scored); B. Ponting (penalty scored); Peach (penalty scored)		(penalty scored) Olsen; (penalty scored) Scott; (penalty missed) S. Duarte; (penalty scored) Ball

19 November 6	Preston Lions	6–0	South Hobart	Melbourne
19:30 (AEDT)	Cuba 10'; Brooks 49', 74', 78'; Lazarevski 52'; Markovski 79'	Report		Stadium: B.T. Connor Reserve; Attendance: 2,969; Referee: Eric Saba

== Finals series ==
The quarter-finals are scheduled to be played in November at the home grounds of the group winners.

Quarter-finals
South Melbourne
Oakleigh Cannons
Broadmeadow Magic
Lions FC
Bayswater City
Sydney United 58
Preston Lions
Wests APIA

Semi-finals

Final
13 December

== Top goalscorers ==
As of 22 November 2026

Rank	Player	Club	Goals
1	(Australia) Lleyton Brooks	Preston Lions	6
1	(Australia) Michael Ruhs	Sydney Olympic	6
3	(Australia) Cameron Teece	Bayswater City	5
3	(Australia) Niyah Joseph	Avondale	5
5	(Australia) Daniel Bressan	Adelaide City	4
5	(Australia) Jordan Segreto	Wests APIA	4
7	(Mexico) Luis Lara Delgardo	Broadmeadow Magic	3
7	(Australia) Alen Harbas	Sutherland Sharks	3
7	(Australia) Taye Hedley	Wests APIA	3
7	(Australia) Chris Jackson	Bayswater City	3
7	(Australia) Kobe Kemp	South Hobart	3
7	(Australia) Lachlan Scott	Wollongong Wolves	3
7	(Australia) Riley Smith	Broadmeadow Magic	3
7	(Australia) Bailey Wells	Broadmeadow Magic	3
7	(Australia) Mason Wells	Sydney United 58	3

== See also ==
- 2026–27 A-League Men
