= 2026–27 in Australian soccer =

58th season of national competitive soccer in Australia

Soccer in Australia
- Season: 2026–27

The 2026–27 season is the 58th season of national competitive soccer in Australia and 144th overall.

== National teams ==
=== Men's senior ===
==== Friendlies ====
The following is a list of friendlies (to be) played by the men's senior national team in 2026–27.

25 September 2026	Australia	1–1	Brazil	Townsville, Australia
20:00 UTC+10	Irankunda 68'	Report	Rayan 90+4'	Stadium: Queensland Country Bank Stadium; Attendance: 25,440; Referee: Ryo Tanimoto (Japan)

29 September 2026	Australia	2–4	Brazil	Brisbane, Australia
20:00 UTC+10	Circati 30'; Metcalfe 34'	Report	Vanderson 3'; Raphinha 45+1' (pen.); Guimarães 70'; Vinícius 80' (pen.)	Stadium: Suncorp Stadium; Attendance: 52,423; Referee: Yusuke Araki (Japan)

13 November 2026	Qatar	0–3	Australia	Doha, Qatar
17:45 UTC+3		Report	McGree 5'; T. Yengi 32'; Irankunda 40'	Stadium: Abdullah bin Khalifa Stadium; Referee: Yahya Al-Mulla (United Arab Emirates)

17 November 2026	Jordan	2–0	Australia	Doha, Qatar (Note: On 12 November, the Jordan Football Association and Football Australia announced that the match would be relocated from Amman, Jordan to Doha, Qatar due to "security concerns.")
--:-- UTC+3	Al-Taamari 34'; Olwan 90+3'	Report		Stadium: Suheim bin Hamad Stadium; Referee: Saud Al-Samhan (Kuwait)

==== FIFA World Cup ====
The group stage of the 2026 FIFA World Cup was a part of the previous season.

3 July 2026 Round of 32	Australia	1–1 (a.e.t.) (2–4 p)	Egypt	Arlington, United States
13:00 UTC−5	Hany 55' (o.g.)	Report	Ashour 13'	Stadium: AT&T Stadium; Attendance: 70,244; Referee: Gustavo Tejera (Uruguay)
	Penalties
	Souttar (penalty missed); Irvine (penalty scored); Mabil (penalty scored); Herrington (penalty missed)		(penalty scored) Saber; (penalty scored) Rabia; (penalty scored) Salah; (penalty scored) Abdelmaguid

==== AFC Asian Cup ====
Originally scheduled to be held in Saudi Arabia from 7 January to 5 February 2027, the tournament was postponed to start from 23 December 2027 to 21 January 2028 due to "exceptional circumstances" associated with the 2026 Iran war.

TBA 2027 Asian Cup GS	Australia	Postponed	Singapore	Khobar, Saudi Arabia
				Stadium: Aramco Stadium

TBA 2027 Asian Cup GS	Iraq	Postponed	Australia	Riyadh, Saudi Arabia
				Stadium: King Saud University Stadium

TBA 2027 Asian Cup GS	Australia	Postponed	Tajikistan	Riyadh, Saudi Arabia
				Stadium: Al Shabab Stadium

=== Women's senior ===
==== Friendlies ====
The following is a list of friendlies (to be) played by the women's senior national team in 2026–27.

9 October 2026	Germany	4–2	Australia	Karlsruhe, Germany
20:30 UTC+1	Kössler 23', 30'; Küver 83'; Nüsken 90+4'	Report	Kerr 45+2'; McNamara 90+2'	Stadium: Wildparkstadion; Attendance: 26,352; Referee: Olivia Tschon (Austria)

13 October 2026	Haiti	1–7	Australia	Chambly, France
21:00 UTC+1	Dumornay 3'	Report	McKenna 2', 44'; K. Louis 53' (o.g.); Foord 65'; Galic 72'; Wheeler 79'; McNamara 89'	Stadium: Stade Walter-Luzi; Referee: Jelena Medjedovic (Serbia)

28 November 2026	Australia	v	Colombia	Canberra, Australia
19:35 UTC+11		Source		Stadium: GIO Stadium

2 December 2026	Australia	v	Colombia	Geelong, Australia
19:35 UTC+11		Source		Stadium: GMHBA Stadium

==== Olympic qualifying tournament ====
Australia were drawn into Group A, which has a home-and-away league format, concluding in December 2027. The winner of each group qualifies for the 2028 Summer Olympics women's football tournament in the United States.

19 April 2027 Group stage	Chinese Taipei	v	Australia
		Source

24 April 2027 Group stage	Australia	v	Japan
		Source

==== FIFA World Cup ====
The group stage will straddle June and July 2027.

June 2027 World Cup GS	Australia	v	TBD	Brazil

June/July 2027 World Cup GS	Australia	v	TBD	Brazil

July 2027 World Cup GS	Australia	v	TBD	Brazil

=== Men's under-23 ===
==== Friendlies ====
The following is a list of friendlies (to be) played by the men's under-23 national team in 2026–27.

3 October 2026	Australia	1–2	South Korea	Gosford, Australia
15:00 UTC+10	Kim Min-soo 19' (o.g.)	Report	Ha Jeong-woo 2'; Yoon Do-young 39' (pen.)	Stadium: polytec Stadium

6 October 2026	Australia	2–2	South Korea	Gosford, Australia
13:00 UTC+11	Di Pizio 45+5'; Akon 73'	Report	Sung Ye-geon 12'; Kim Ye-geon 36'	Stadium: polytec Stadium

=== Men's under-20 ===
==== Friendlies ====
The following is a list of friendlies (to be) played by the men's under-20 national team in 2026–27.

==== AFC U-20 Asian Cup qualification ====
Australia failed to qualify for the U-20 Asian Cup, after coming third in the group stage.

31 August 2026 Group stage	Laos	0–2	Australia	Vientiane, Laos
19:00 ICT		Report	Neill 13' (pen.); Marinucci 49'	Stadium: New Laos National Stadium; Referee: Omar Al-Yaqoubi (Oman)

3 September 2026 Group stage	Malaysia	2–2	Australia	Vientiane, Laos
16:00 ICT	Fadhlul Hadi 50'; Izzuddin Afif 70'	Report	Neill 4'; Abdul-Rahman 82'	Stadium: New Laos National Stadium; Referee: Zayniddin Alimov (Kyrgyzstan)

6 September 2026 Group stage	Australia	0–2	Indonesia	Vientiane, Laos
16:00 ICT		Report	Leeming 28'; Brkić 90'	Stadium: New Laos National Stadium; Referee: Omar Al-Yaqoubi (Oman)

=== Women's under-20 ===
==== Friendlies ====
The following is a list of friendlies (to be) played by the women's under-20 national team in 2026–27.

=== Men's under-17 ===
==== Friendlies ====
The following is a list of friendlies (to be) played by the men's under-17 national team in 2026–27.

5 July 2026 2026 CFA U17 Invitational Tournament	China	3–0	Australia	Yinchuan, China
19:35 UTC+8	Shuai Weihao 5'; Zhao Songyuan 53'; Sun Chenxi 88'	Report		Stadium: Helan Mountain Stadium; Attendance: 26,836; Referee: Du Jianxin (China)

8 July 2026 2026 CFA U17 Invitational Tournament	Australia	4–2	Nigeria	Yinchuan, China
16:00 UTC+8	Lombardo; Savic; Harrison	Report	?; ?	Stadium: Helan Mountain Stadium

11 July 2026 2026 CFA U17 Invitational Tournament	Tanzania	5–3	Australia	Yinchuan, China
16:00 UTC+8	Chenga; Hussein; Mbengelendi	Report	Harrison; Linton; Buttigieg	Stadium: Helan Mountain Stadium; Referee: Tian Jin (China)

24 September 2026 2026 Copa España U17	Panama	1–0	Australia	Salou, Spain
16:00 CEDT	López	Report		Stadium: Mediterranean Sports Complex

29 September 2026 2026 Copa España U17	Morocco	0–0	Australia	Salou, Spain
16:00 CEDT		Report		Stadium: Mediterranean Sports Complex

==== CFA U16 Invitational Tournament ====
The younger cohort (U-16) won the CFA Team China U-16 Cup, after defeating hosts China in the final match.

24 September 2026	Australia	4–2	Vietnam	Shenyang, China
14:00 CST	Harrison 28', 56'; Hooper 66' (pen.); Vương Đình Minh Quang 34' (o.g.)	Report	Nguyễn Văn Cảnh 21'; Nguyễn Minh Nhật 71'	Stadium: Shenhe District Cultural and Sports Center Stadium

27 September 2026	Kyrgyzstan	2–2	Australia	Shenyang, China
19:35 CST	44'; 90'	Report	Hogan 71'; Dunne 71'	Stadium: Shenhe District Cultural and Sports Center Stadium

30 September 2026	China	0–1	Australia	Shenyang, China
19:35 CST		Report	Harrison 34'	Stadium: Shenhe District Cultural and Sports Center Stadium

==== FIFA U-17 World Cup ====
Australia qualified for the U-17 World Cup in Qatar, after reaching the quarter-finals in the 2026 AFC U-17 Asian Cup in May 2026.

19 November 2026 Group stage	Argentina	0–2	Australia	Al Rayyan, Qatar
19:00		Report	Güich 60' (o.g.); Akon 71'	Stadium: Aspire Zone; Referee: Michael Venne (Canada)

22 November 2026 Group stage	Denmark	v	Australia	Al Rayyan, Qatar
15:30		Source		Stadium: Aspire Zone

25 November 2026 Group stage	Australia	v	Mozambique	Al Rayyan, Qatar
18:30		Source		Stadium: Aspire Zone

=== Women's under-17 ===
==== Friendlies ====
The following is a list of friendlies (to be) played by the women's under-17 national team in 2026–27.

==== FIFA U-17 Women's World Cup ====
Australia qualified for the U-17 World Cup in Morocco, after reaching the semi-finals in the 2026 AFC U-17 Women's Asian Cup in May 2026.

19 October 2026 Group stage	Australia	1–1	Chile	Salé, Morocco
18:00 MST	Bradshaw 63'	Report	Concha 33'	Stadium: Mohammed VI Football Academy; Attendance: 171; Referee: Josephine Wanjiru (Kenya)

22 October 2026 Group stage	Spain	3–1	Australia	Salé, Morocco
15:00 MST	Gálvez 10', 66' (pen.); Vizuete 16'	Report	Karaberis 68'	Stadium: Mohammed VI Football Academy; Attendance: 200; Referee: Alejandra Quisbert (Bolivia)

25 October 2026 Group stage	Mexico	1–0	Australia	Salé, Morocco
15:00 MST	Reyes 35'	Report		Stadium: Mohammed VI Football Academy; Attendance: 310; Referee: Emanuela Rusta (Albania)

=== Men's under-15 ===
==== FIFA U-15 World Cup & Festival ====
Australia participated in the U-15 World Cup & Festival in Azerbaijan, and came 24th out of a total of 189 nations competing.

24 October 2026 Qualification stage	Haiti	1–3	Australia	Baku, Azerbaijan
14:30 UTC+4				Stadium: Hövsan Competition Complex

25 October 2026 Qualification stage	Australia	4–0	Israel	Baku, Azerbaijan
12:45 UTC+4				Stadium: Hövsan Competition Complex

25 October 2026 Qualification stage	Azerbaijan	1–3	Australia	Baku, Azerbaijan
19:30 UTC+4				Stadium: Hövsan Competition Complex

26 October 2026 Qualification stage	Timor-Leste	1–11	Australia	Baku, Azerbaijan
11:30 UTC+4				Stadium: Hövsan Competition Complex

26 October 2026 Qualification stage	Australia	3–1	Andorra	Baku, Azerbaijan
19:30 UTC+4				Stadium: Hövsan Competition Complex

28 October 2026 Round of 32	Australia	2–7	Greece	Baku, Azerbaijan
14:30 UTC+4				Stadium: Hövsan Competition Complex

28 October 2026 17th–32nd R16	Australia	2–1	Estonia	Baku, Azerbaijan
20:45 UTC+4				Stadium: Hövsan Competition Complex

29 October 2026 17th–24th QF	Australia	1–2	Albania	Baku, Azerbaijan
11:30 UTC+4				Stadium: Hövsan Competition Complex

29 October 2026 21st–24th SF	Wales	1–3	Australia	Baku, Azerbaijan
18:15 UTC+4				Stadium: Hövsan Competition Complex

30 October 2026 23rd-place match	Cameroon	2–0	Australia	Baku, Azerbaijan
09:00 UTC+4				Stadium: Hövsan Competition Complex

== AFC competitions ==
=== AFC Champions League Elite ===
Newcastle Jets qualified to the League stage as premiers in the 2025–26 A-League Men, while Adelaide United qualified to the Playoff stage as runners-up in the 2025–26 A-League Men. Adelaide lost their playoff match, entering the group stage of the AFC Champions League Two instead.

Pos	Team	Pld	W	D	L	GF	GA	GD	Pts
12	(Thailand) Buriram United	4	0	3	1	2	3	−1	3
13	(Thailand) Port	4	1	0	3	9	14	−5	3
14	(Thailand) Ratchaburi	4	0	1	3	6	10	−4	1
15	(South Korea) Pohang Steelers	4	0	1	3	4	11	−7	1
16	(Australia) Newcastle Jets	4	0	0	4	6	19	−13	0

Updated to match(es) played on 4 November 2026. Source: AFC
Rules for classification: 1) points; 2) goal difference; 3) number of goals scored; 4) number of matches won; 5) penalty shoot-out if only two teams remain tied and played each other on the final matchday 6) fair play ranking; 7) drawing of lots

=== AFC Champions League Two ===
Melbourne Victory qualified to the Group stage as fourth-place in the 2025 Australia Cup, as the cup winners Newcastle Jets qualified for the Asian Champions League Elite via their league position. The AFC ruled that the Australia Cup runner-up Heidelberg United was ineligible to compete.

Adelaide United qualified to the Group stage after losing their AFC Champions League Elite playoff match.

Pos	Team	Pld	W	D	L	GF	GA	GD	Pts	Qualification
1	(Indonesia) Persib (A)	4	4	0	0	6	1	+5	12	Advance to round of 16
2	(South Korea) FC Seoul	4	2	0	2	8	4	+4	6	Advance to round of 16
3	(Australia) Melbourne Victory	4	1	1	2	5	5	0	4	
4	(Vietnam) Thể Công–Viettel	4	0	1	3	1	10	−9	1	

Updated to match(es) played on 4 November 2026. Source: ACL2
Rules for classification: Tiebreakers
(A) Advance to a further round

Pos	Team	Pld	W	D	L	GF	GA	GD	Pts	Qualification
1	(Singapore) Lion City Sailors	4	3	1	0	9	1	+8	10	Advance to round of 16
2	(Thailand) BG Pathum United	4	2	1	1	9	4	+5	7	Advance to round of 16
3	(Australia) Adelaide United	4	2	0	2	5	8	−3	6	
4	(Hong Kong) Tai Po (E)	4	0	0	4	1	11	−10	0	

Updated to match(es) played on 5 November 2026. Source: ACL2
Rules for classification: Tiebreakers
(E) Eliminated

=== AFC Women's Champions League ===
Melbourne City qualified for the competition as premiers of the 2025–26 A-League Women, qualifying for the third straight time. They were second in their group, and qualified to the knockout stage as the best second-placed team, earning them seeding in the quarter-final draw and a home game in March 2027.

Pos	Team	Pld	W	D	L	GF	GA	GD	Pts	Qualification
1	(Uzbekistan) Nasaf (H)	3	2	0	1	7	2	+5	6 (Note: Tied on head-to-head points. Head-to-head goal difference was used as the tiebreaker; Nasaf +1, Melbourne City 0, Beijing Jingtan −1.)	Advance to Quarter-finals
2	(Australia) Melbourne City	3	2	0	1	9	2	+7	6	Advance to Quarter-finals
3	(China) Beijing Jingtan	3	2	0	1	8	3	+5	6	Advance to Quarter-finals
4	(Philippines) Kaya–Iloilo	3	0	0	3	0	17	−17	0	

Source: AFC
Rules for classification: Tiebreakers
(H) Hosts
Notes:

Knockout stage

27–28 March 2027 Quarter-final	Melbourne City (Australia)	v	TBD	Melbourne, Australia

== OFC competitions ==
=== 2027 OFC Professional League ===
Australian club South Melbourne will participate in this competition, set to commence in January 2027.

== Domestic leagues ==
=== A-League Men ===
Twelve clubs are participating in the 2026–27 season, after the Australian Professional Leagues terminated Western United’s A-Leagues Men and Womens' licenses.

Pos	Team	Pld	W	D	L	GF	GA	GD	Pts	Qualification
1	Wellington Phoenix (Note: Auckland FC and Wellington Phoenix cannot qualify for Asian Football Confederation competitions as they are based in New Zealand, which is part of the Oceania Football Confederation.)	4	3	1	0	7	1	+6	10	Qualification for the finals series (Note: The top two teams enter the finals series at the semi-finals, while the teams ranked third to sixth enter the finals series at the elimination-finals.)
2	Sydney FC	4	2	1	1	7	4	+3	7	Qualification for the AFC Champions League Elite league stage and the finals series
3	Brisbane Roar	3	2	1	0	5	3	+2	7	Qualification for the AFC Champions League Elite preliminary stage and the finals series
4	Melbourne City	4	2	1	1	6	6	0	7	Qualification for the finals series
5	Perth Glory	4	2	0	2	8	5	+3	6	Qualification for the finals series
6	Western Sydney Wanderers	4	1	2	1	6	4	+2	5	Qualification for the finals series
7	Macarthur FC	4	1	2	1	4	4	0	5	
8	Auckland FC	4	1	2	1	6	7	−1	5	
9	Melbourne Victory	4	0	3	1	5	6	−1	3	
10	Newcastle Jets	4	0	2	2	4	8	−4	2	
11	Central Coast Mariners	4	0	2	2	4	9	−5	2	
12	Adelaide United	3	0	1	2	3	8	−5	1	

Updated to match(es) played on 8 November 2026. Source: A-Leagues
Rules for classification: 1) points; 2) goal difference; 3) goals scored; 4) wins; 5) head-to-head results; 5a) head-to-head points; 5b) head-to-head goal difference; 6) Fair Play points; 7) away goal difference; 8) away goals per match; 9) home goal difference; 10) home goals per match; 11) toss of a coin in an event of a tie of two clubs.

=== A-League Women ===
Eleven clubs are participating in the 2026–27 season, after the Australian Professional Leagues terminated Western United’s A-Leagues Men and Womens' licenses. Additional women's clubs, Auckland FC and Macarthur FC, are expected to join in the following season.

Pos	Team	Pld	W	D	L	GF	GA	GD	Pts	Qualification
1	Central Coast Mariners	5	3	1	1	12	5	+7	10	Qualification for AFC Women's Champions League and Finals series
2	Wellington Phoenix (Note: Wellington Phoenix cannot qualify for the AFC Women's Champions League as they are based in New Zealand, which is part of the Oceania Football Confederation.)	6	3	1	2	9	6	+3	10	Qualification for Finals series
3	Perth Glory	5	3	1	1	4	1	+3	10	Qualification for Finals series
4	Melbourne Victory	5	2	2	1	4	4	0	8	Qualification for Finals series
5	Melbourne City	3	2	1	0	8	2	+6	7	Qualification for Finals series
6	Western Sydney Wanderers	4	2	0	2	5	4	+1	6	Qualification for Finals series
7	Canberra United	4	2	0	2	3	7	−4	6	
8	Sydney FC	4	1	1	2	4	10	−6	4	
9	Brisbane Roar	5	1	0	4	5	9	−4	3	
10	Adelaide United	5	0	3	2	3	7	−4	3	
11	Newcastle Jets	4	0	2	2	2	4	−2	2	

Updated to match(es) played on 20 November 2026. Source: A-Leagues
Rules for classification: 1) points; 2) goal difference; 3) goals scored; 4) wins; 5) head-to-head results; 5a) head-to-head points; 5b) head-to-head goal difference; 6) Fair Play points; 7) away goal difference; 8) away goals per match; 9) home goal difference; 10) home goals per match; 11) toss of a coin in an event of a tie of two clubs.

=== National Premier Leagues ===
==== Australian Championship ====
In addition to the Foundation Clubs, the following teams qualified for the 2026 Australian Championship:

Competition	Club
2026 NPL Capital Football	Canberra Croatia
2026 NPL NSW	Sutherland Sharks (Note: Qualified as fourth-place; Top three teams already qualified as "Foundation Clubs".)
2026 NPL Northern NSW	Broadmeadow Magic
2026 NPL Queensland	Lions FC
2026 NPL South Australia	Adelaide City
2026 NPL Tasmania	South Hobart
2026 NPL Victoria	Oakleigh Cannons
2026 NPL Western Australia	Bayswater City

===== Group A =====
Pos	Team	Pld	W	PKW	PKL	L	GF	GA	GD	Pts		SMB	SUD	STS	CBR
1	South Melbourne	6	3	2	0	1	9	4	+5	13	Finals series	—	1–1	0–0	5–2
2	Sydney United 58	6	3	1	1	1	8	5	+3	12	Finals series	1–0	—	2–0	1–1
3	Sutherland Sharks	6	2	0	1	3	6	5	+1	7		0–1	1–2	—	3–0
4	Canberra Croatia	6	1	0	1	4	5	14	−9	4		0–2	2–1	0–2	—

Source: Football Australia
Legend: Blue = home team win; Yellow = draw; Red = away team win.

===== Group B =====
Pos	Team	Pld	W	PKW	PKL	L	GF	GA	GD	Pts		APL	BRD	AVO	ADL
1	Wests APIA (Q)	5	4	0	1	0	13	4	+9	13	Finals series	—	2–1	5–2	3–0
2	Broadmeadow Magic (Q)	5	3	1	0	1	8	6	+2	11	Finals series	0–0	—	2–1	3–2
3	Avondale FC (E)	5	1	1	0	3	8	12	−4	5			1–2	—	2–1
4	Adelaide City (E)	5	0	0	1	4	6	13	−7	1		1–3		2–2	—

Updated to match(es) played on 12 November 2026. Source: Football Australia
Legend: Blue = home team win; Yellow = draw; Red = away team win.
(E) Eliminated; (Q) Qualified to the phase indicated

===== Group C =====
Pos	Team	Pld	W	PKW	PKL	L	GF	GA	GD	Pts		BAY	OAK	MAR	OLY
1	Bayswater City	6	4	0	1	1	13	8	+5	13	Finals series	—	0–0	3–1	2–1
2	Oakleigh Cannons	6	3	1	2	0	12	6	+6	13	Finals series	4–2	—	2–2	4–2
3	Marconi Stallions	6	1	2	0	3	8	13	−5	7		1–4	0–0	—	2–1
4	Sydney Olympic	6	1	0	0	5	8	14	−6	3		1–2	0–2	3–2	—

Source: Football Australia
Legend: Blue = home team win; Yellow = draw; Red = away team win.

===== Group D =====
Pos	Team	Pld	W	PKW	PKL	L	GF	GA	GD	Pts		PRE	LIO	WOL	SHO
1	Preston Lions	6	4	0	1	1	14	5	+9	13	Finals series	—	3–1	0–0	6–0
2	Lions FC	6	3	1	0	2	12	10	+2	11	Finals series	2–1	—	1–1	1–2
3	Wollongong Wolves	6	2	1	1	2	9	7	+2	9		1–2	1–3	—	2–0
4	South Hobart	6	1	0	0	5	6	19	−13	3		1–2	2–4	1–4	—

Source: Football Australia
Legend: Blue = home team win; Yellow = draw; Red = away team win.

Knockout stage

== Domestic cups ==
=== Australia Cup ===
Round of 32
Marlin Coast Rangers	0
Brunswick Juventus	4
Preston Lions	3
Newcastle Jets	2
South Melbourne	2
Adelaide United	1
Maitland FC	1
Fremantle City	2
Lions FC (p)	1 (4)
Perth Glory	1 (2)
Weston Bears	0
Melbourne City	3
FK Beograd	2
North Sunshine Eagles	3
Cumberland United	0
Heidelberg United	3
Sydney Olympic	0
Brisbane Roar	3
Bayswater City	1
Sydney FC	5
Rochedale Rovers	1
SD Raiders	2
Azzurri United	0
Macarthur FC	3
APIA Leichhardt	2
Peninsula Power	1
Sydney United 58 (p)	1 (11)
Central Coast Mariners	1 (10)
Tigers FC	0
Western Sydney Wanderers	2
Kingborough Lions United	0
Melbourne Victory	4

Round of 16
Brunswick Juventus	1
Preston Lions	4
South Melbourne (p)	3 (3)
Fremantle City	3 (1)
Lions FC	2
Melbourne City	0
North Sunshine Eagles (p)	0 (4)
Heidelberg United	0 (3)
Brisbane Roar	2
Sydney FC	4
SD Raiders (p)	1 (5)
Macarthur FC	1 (3)
APIA Leichhardt (p)	1 (3)
Sydney United 58	1 (2)
Western Sydney Wanderers	1 (2)
Melbourne Victory (p)	1 (3)

Quarter-finals
Preston Lions	1
South Melbourne	2
Lions FC	4
North Sunshine Eagles	0
SD Raiders	0
Sydney FC	1
APIA Leichhardt	0
Melbourne Victory	1

Semi-finals
South Melbourne	3
Lions FC	1
Sydney FC	0
Melbourne Victory	2

Final
South Melbourne (p)	1 (4)
Melbourne Victory	1 (3)

==== Final ====
10 October 2026
19:50 AEDT

South Melbourne (2)	1–1 (a.e.t.)	Melbourne Victory (1)
Mikkola 117'	Report	Genreau 95'
Penalties
Jankovic (penalty scored); Swibel (penalty scored); Lackay (penalty scored); Mesourouni (penalty scored)	4–3	(penalty scored) May; (penalty missed) Sawyer; (penalty scored) Ghossaini; (penalty scored) Genreau; (penalty missed) Davidson

AAMI Park, Melbourne
Attendance: 29,911
Referee: Alireza Faghani

== Deaths ==
- 20 July 2026: Kevin Keegan OBE, 75, England and Blacktown City midfielder/forward.
- 12 November 2026: Archie Blue, 86, Australia, Footscray JUST, Slavia Melbourne, and APIA Leichhardt forward.

== Retirements ==
- 7 July 2026: Róbert Mak, 35, former Slovakia and Sydney FC midfielder.
- 11 July 2026: Mitch Duke, 36, former Socceroos forward, retired from international football.
- 16 August 2026: Carl Jenkinson, 33, former England, Melbourne City, and Newcastle Jets defender.
- 10 September 2026: Scott Wootton, 34, former Wellington Phoenix and Perth Glory defender.
- 17 September 2026: Lauren Allan, 29, former Newcastle Jets forward.
- 9 November 2026: Jess Fishlock, 39, former Wales, Melbourne Victory, and Melbourne City midfielder.
- 18 November 2026: Juan Mata, 38, former Spain, Western Sydney Wanderers, and Melbourne Victory midfielder.
