= 2022 Australia Cup =

2022 season of Australia's national knockout soccer competition

Tournament details
- Country: Australia; New Zealand
- Dates: 11 February – 1 October 2022
- Teams: 750 (qualifying competition); 32 (main competition)

Final positions
- Champions: Macarthur FC (1st title)
- Runners-up: Sydney United 58
- AFC Cup: Macarthur FC

Tournament statistics
- Matches played: 31
- Goals scored: 119 (3.84 per match)
- Attendance: 67,918 (2,191 per match)
- Top goal scorer: Al Hassan Toure (5 goals)

The 2022 Australia Cup was the ninth season of the Australia Cup, the main national soccer knockout cup competition in Australia. This edition was the first under the new name of the "Australia Cup" following the renaming of Football Federation Australia to Football Australia. Thirty-two teams contested the competition proper.

Melbourne Victory were the defending champions but were eliminated by Western United in the Round of 32. Macarthur FC won the first trophy in their history after defeating Sydney United 58 in the final. Sydney United 58 was the first member federation club to qualify for the Australia Cup final, with the Australia Cup final also being the first to feature two teams of the same state.

The 2022 edition was the first in which the winners qualified for the AFC Cup. Macarthur FC competed in the 2023–24 edition, reaching the ASEAN zonal final before being defeated by Central Coast Mariners.

== Round and dates ==
Round	Draw date	Match dates	Number of fixtures	Teams	New entries this round
Preliminary rounds	Various	11 February–2 July	718	750 → 32	742
Round of 32	29 June	21 July–4 August	16	32 → 16	8
Round of 16	3 August	10–17 August	8	16 → 8	None
Quarter-finals	17 August	27–31 August	4	8 → 4	None
Semi-finals	31 August	11–14 September	2	4 → 2	None
Final	—	1 October	1	2 → 1	None

== Teams ==
A total of 32 teams will participate in the 2022 Australia Cup competition proper.

A-League Men clubs represent the highest level in the Australian league system, whereas Member Federation clubs come from level 2 and below.

A-League clubs
Adelaide United	Brisbane Roar	Central Coast Mariners	Macarthur FC
Melbourne City	Melbourne Victory	Newcastle Jets	Sydney FC
Wellington Phoenix	Western United		
Member federation clubs
(Australian Capital Territory) Monaro Panthers (2)	(New South Wales) Bonnyrigg White Eagles (3)	(New South Wales) NWS Spirit (3)	(New South Wales) Sydney United 58 (2)
(New South Wales) Wollongong United (6)	(New South Wales) Broadmeadow Magic (2)	(New South Wales) Newcastle Olympic (2)	(Northern Territory) Mindil Aces (2)
(Queensland) Brisbane City (2)	(Queensland) Logan Lightning (2)	(Queensland) Magpies Crusaders United (3)	(Queensland) Peninsula Power (2)
(South Australia) Adelaide City (2)	(South Australia) Modbury Jets (3)	(Tasmania) Devonport City (2)	(Victoria (state)) Avondale FC (2)
(Victoria (state)) Bentleigh Greens (2)	(Victoria (state)) Green Gully (2)	(Victoria (state)) Heidelberg United (2)	(Victoria (state)) Oakleigh Cannons (2)
(Western Australia) Armadale SC (2)	(Western Australia) Cockburn City (2)		

== Prize fund ==
The prize fund has been unchanged since 2015, though this is the first year the winner will also benefit from participating in the 2023–24 AFC Cup.

Round	No. of Clubs receive fund	Prize fund
Round of 16	8	$2,000
Quarter-finalists	4	$5,000
Semi-finalists	2	$10,000
Final runners-up	1	$25,000
Final winner	1	$50,000
Total		$131,000

== Preliminary rounds ==
Member federation teams are competing in various state-based preliminary rounds to win one of 22 places in the competition proper (at the Round of 32). All Australian clubs (other than youth teams associated with A-League franchises) are eligible to enter the qualifying process through their respective member federation; however, only one team per club is permitted entry into the competition. The preliminary rounds operate within a consistent national structure whereby club entry into the competition is staggered in each state/territory, determined by what level the club sits at in the Australian soccer league system. This ultimately leads to round 7 with the winning clubs from that round entering directly into the round of 32.

As there was no NPL Champion in the previous year, an additional slot was allocated to Victoria for this edition only.

The top eight placed A-League Men clubs from the 2021–22 A-League Men season gained automatic qualification to the Round of 32. The remaining four teams entered a play-off series to determine the remaining two positions.

Federation	Associated competition	Round of 32 qualifiers
Football Australia	A-League Men	10
Capital Football (ACT)	Federation Cup (ACT)	1
Football NSW	Waratah Cup	4
Northern NSW Football	—	2
Football Northern Territory	NT Australia Cup Final	1
Football Queensland	—	4
Football South Australia	Federation Cup (SA)	2
Football Tasmania	Milan Lakoseljac Cup	1
Football Victoria	Dockerty Cup	5
Football West (WA)	State Cup	2

== Bracket ==
Round of 32
Peninsula Power	4
NWS Spirit	1
Wollongong United	2
Green Gully	3
Sydney United 58	3
Monaro Panthers	0
Western United	2
Melbourne Victory	1
Adelaide City	1
Logan Lightning	0
Newcastle Jets	0
Adelaide United	2
Mindil Aces	0
Avondale FC	6
Heidelberg United	1
Brisbane Roar	3
Bonnyrigg White Eagles	0
Oakleigh Cannons	5
Brisbane City	3
Cockburn City	1
Bentleigh Greens (a.e.t.)	2
Broadmeadow Magic	1
Sydney FC (p)	3 (3)
Central Coast Mariners	3 (1)
Armadale SC	2
Modbury Jets	5
Magpies Crusaders United	0
Macarthur FC	6
Newcastle Olympic	0
Melbourne City	1
Devonport City	0
Wellington Phoenix	4

Round of 16
Peninsula Power	2
Green Gully	1
Sydney United 58 (p)	1 (4)
Western United	1 (3)
Adelaide City	2 (1)
Adelaide United (p)	2 (4)
Avondale FC	2 (1)
Brisbane Roar (p)	2 (4)
Oakleigh Cannons (a.e.t.)	5
Brisbane City	3
Bentleigh Greens	1
Sydney FC	2
Modbury Jets	0
Macarthur FC	4
Melbourne City	1
Wellington Phoenix	2

Quarter-finals
Peninsula Power	0
Sydney United 58	1
Adelaide United	1
Brisbane Roar	2
Oakleigh Cannons	2
Sydney FC	1
Macarthur FC	2
Wellington Phoenix	0

Semi-finals
Sydney United 58 (a.e.t.)	3
Brisbane Roar	2
Oakleigh Cannons	2
Macarthur FC	5

Final
Sydney United 58	0
Macarthur FC	2

== Round of 32 ==
The round of 32 draw took place on 29 June 2022. The lowest ranked side that qualified for this round was Wollongong United. They were the only level 6 team left in the competition.

Times are AEST (UTC+10), as listed by Football Australia (local times, if different, are in parentheses).

21 July 2022	Bentleigh Greens (2)	2–1 (a.e.t.)	Broadmeadow Magic (2)	Melbourne
19:30	Lambadaridis 31'; Krolicki 117'	Report	Dowse 32'	Stadium: Kingston Heath; Attendance: 501; Referee: Lara Lee

21 July 2022	Bonnyrigg White Eagles (3)	0–5	Oakleigh Cannons (2)	Sydney
19:30		Report	Guest 32'; Lucas 57'; Clark 67', 73'; Dekker 78'	Stadium: Bonnyrigg Sports Ground; Attendance: 856; Referee: Shane Skinner

21 July 2022	Mindil Aces (2)	0–6	Avondale FC (2)	Darwin
19:30 (19:00 UTC+9:30)		Report	Hilliar 11'; Boland 27', 47', 89'; Diaz 49', 84'	Stadium: Darwin Football Stadium; Attendance: 1,043; Referee: Casey Reibelt

21 July 2022	Armadale SC (2)	2–5	Modbury Jets (3)	Perth
20:30 (18:30 UTC+8)	Jelenovic 6', 69'	Report	Conant 18'; Ditroia 33'; H. McCabe 35'; O'Doherty 45+2'; L. McCabe 56'	Stadium: Alfred Skeet Reserve; Attendance: 570; Referee: Jack Morgan

27 July 2022	Heidelberg United (2)	1–3	Brisbane Roar (1)	Melbourne
19:30	Petratos 57' (pen.)	Report	Akbari 2'; Hore 59'; Mileusnic 88'	Stadium: Olympic Village; Attendance: 1,937; Referee: Alex King

27 July 2022	Brisbane City (2)	3–1	Cockburn City (2)	Brisbane
19:30	Hirayama 58'; Sibatuara 61'; Reeves 90+2' (pen.)	Report	Robinson 25'	Stadium: Perry Park; Attendance: 762; Referee: Alireza Faghani

27 July 2022	Adelaide City (2)	1–0	Logan Lightning (2)	Adelaide
19:30 (19:00 UTC+9:30)	Bressan 28'	Report		Stadium: Marden Sports Complex; Attendance: 600; Referee: Sam Kelly

27 July 2022	Wollongong United (6)	2–3	Green Gully (2)	Wollongong
19:30	Yamada 19' (pen.); Babarovski 58'	Report	Salmon 41'; Iannucci 60'; Hope 65'	Stadium: Ian McLennan Park; Attendance: 1,355; Referee: Stephen Lucas

30 July 2022	Magpies Crusaders United (3)	0–6	Macarthur FC (1)	Mackay
17:30		Report	Carter 2'; Aspropotamitis 53'; De Silva 56'; Arzani 77' (pen.); Toure 79', 90'	Stadium: BB Print Stadium; Attendance: 1,141; Referee: Adam Kersey

30 July 2022	Newcastle Jets (1)	0–2	Adelaide United (1)	Newcastle
19:30		Report	Blackwood 45'; Ibusuki 79'	Stadium: McDonald Jones Stadium; Attendance: 4,439; Referee: Kurt Ams

31 July 2022	Sydney FC (1)	3–3 (a.e.t.) (3–1 p)	Central Coast Mariners (1)	Sydney
16:00	Le Fondre 29' (pen.); Caceres 42'; Burgess 50'	Report	Nkololo 14'; Ruhs 53'; Cummings 90+5'	Stadium: Leichhardt Oval; Attendance: 3,211; Referee: Tim Danaskos
	Penalties
	Le Fondre (penalty missed); Grant (penalty scored); Kucharski (penalty scored); O'Toole (penalty scored)		(penalty missed) Cummings; (penalty missed) Farrell; (penalty scored) Balard; (penalty missed) Roux

2 August 2022	Newcastle Olympic (2)	0–1	Melbourne City (1)	Newcastle
19:30		Report	Oresti 41'	Stadium: No. 2 Sportsground; Attendance: 1,412; Referee: Adam Bavcar

3 August 2022	Peninsula Power (2)	4–1	NWS Spirit (3)	Brisbane
19:30	McLean 15'; Hitchcock 41'; Love-Semira 75', 87'	Report	Cornwell 26'	Stadium: A.J. Kelly Park; Attendance: 750; Referee: Daniel Cook

3 August 2022	Devonport City (2)	0–4	Wellington Phoenix (1)	Devonport
19:30		Report	Waine 9', 64'; van Hattum 61'; Kraev 76'	Stadium: Valley Road Ground; Attendance: 1,550; Referee: Lachlan Keevers

3 August 2022	Sydney United 58 (2)	3–0	Monaro Panthers (2)	Sydney
19:30	Antelmi 37'; Payne 63' (pen.); Cimenti 79'	Report		Stadium: Sydney United Sports Centre; Attendance: 526; Referee: Jonathan Barreiro

3 August 2022	Western United (1)	2–1	Melbourne Victory (1)	Melbourne
19:30	Timotheou 24' (o.g.); Wales 53'	Report	Brimmer 48'	Stadium: AAMI Park; Attendance: 3,670; Referee: Chris Beath

== Round of 16 ==
The round of 16 draw took place on 3 August 2022. The lowest ranked side that qualified for this round was Modbury Jets. They were the only level 3 team left in the competition.

Times are AEST (UTC+10), as listed by Football Australia (local times, if different, are in parentheses).

10 August 2022	Modbury Jets (3)	0–4	Macarthur FC (1)	Adelaide
19:30 (19:00 UTC+9:30)		Report	Toure 9'; Rose 45+2', 90'; M'Mombwa 64'	Stadium: ServiceFM Stadium; Attendance: 1,080; Referee: Jack Morgan

10 August 2022	Bentleigh Greens (2)	1–2	Sydney FC (1)	Melbourne
19:30	Riak 86'	Report	Segecic 40'; Gurd 68'	Stadium: Kingston Heath Soccer Complex; Attendance: 911; Referee: Shaun Evans

14 August 2022	Sydney United 58 (2)	1–1 (a.e.t.) (4–3 p)	Western United (1)	Sydney
14:00	Maia 56'	Report	Pain 43'	Stadium: Sydney United Sports Centre; Attendance: 1,358; Referee: Stephen Lucas
	Penalties
	Trifiro (penalty scored); Fragogiannis (penalty scored); Roberts (penalty missed); Cimenti (penalty scored); Gonzalez (penalty scored)		(penalty scored) Botic; (penalty missed) Garuccio; (penalty scored) Milanovic; (penalty scored) Wales; (penalty missed) Lustica

14 August 2022	Peninsula Power (2)	2–1	Green Gully (2)	Brisbane
16:00	Wolley 79'; Smith 79'	Report	Hope 69'	Stadium: A.J. Kelly Park; Attendance: 1,190; Referee: Casey Reibelt

17 August 2022	Adelaide City (2)	2–2 (a.e.t.) (1–4 p)	Adelaide United (1)	Adelaide
19:30 (19:00 UTC+9:30)	Waters 76'; Dawber 109'	Report	Clough 27'; D'Arrigo 95'	Stadium: ServiceFM Stadium; Attendance: 3,327; Referee: Daniel Elder
	Penalties
	King-Byrne (penalty missed); Devereux (penalty scored); Waters (penalty missed)		(penalty scored) Juande; (penalty scored) Ibusuki; (penalty scored) Popovic; (penalty scored) Halloran

17 August 2022	Melbourne City (1)	1–2	Wellington Phoenix (1)	Melbourne
19:30	Leckie 84'	Report	Barbarouses 19'; Waine 36'	Stadium: Casey Fields; Attendance: 2,067; Referee: Kurt Ams

17 August 2022	Oakleigh Cannons (2)	5–3 (a.e.t.)	Brisbane City (2)	Melbourne
19:30	Niagioran 4', 11'; Guest 60', 94'; Williams 112'	Report	Hirayama 22', 90+3'; Hills 61'	Stadium: Jack Edwards Reserve; Attendance: 650; Referee: Tim Danaskos

17 August 2022	Avondale FC (2)	2–2 (a.e.t.) (1–4 p)	Brisbane Roar (1)	Melbourne
19:30	Boland 67' (pen.); Zinni 119'	Report	Danzaki 58'; Hore 96'	Stadium: ABD Stadium; Attendance: 500; Referee: Ben Abraham
	Penalties
	Ahmed (penalty scored); Trajceski (penalty missed); Aguek (penalty missed)		(penalty scored) Trewin; (penalty scored) Hore; (penalty scored) Austin; (penalty scored) Chapman

== Quarter-finals ==
The quarter-finals draw took place on 17 August 2022. The lowest ranked sides that qualified for this round were Oakleigh Cannons, Peninsula Power and Sydney United 58. They were the only level 2 teams left in the competition.

Times are AEST (UTC+10), as listed by Football Australia (local times, if different, are in parentheses).

28 August 2022	Peninsula Power (2)	0–1	Sydney United 58 (2)	Brisbane
15:00		Report	Fragogiannis 9'	Stadium: A.J. Kelly Park; Attendance: 1,500; Referee: Chris Beath

31 August 2022	Oakleigh Cannons (2)	2–1	Sydney FC (1)	Melbourne
19:30	Dekker 6'; Lucas 31'	Report	Segecic 74'	Stadium: Jack Edwards Reserve; Attendance: 2,142; Referee: Jonathan Barreiro

31 August 2022	Adelaide United (1)	1–2	Brisbane Roar (1)	Adelaide
19:30 (19:00 UTC+9:30)	Ibusuki 42'	Report	O'Shea 7'; Austin 31'	Stadium: ServiceFM Stadium; Attendance: 2,511; Referee: Tim Danaskos

31 August 2022	Macarthur FC (1)	2–0	Wellington Phoenix (1)	Sydney
19:30	Toure 41'; Rose 88'	Report		Stadium: Campbelltown Sports Stadium; Attendance: 1,521; Referee: Daniel Elder

== Semi-finals ==
The semi-finals draw took place on 31 August 2022. The lowest ranked sides that qualified for this round were Oakleigh Cannons and Sydney United 58. They were the only level 2 teams left in the competition.

11 September 2022	Sydney United 58 (2)	3–2 (a.e.t.)	Brisbane Roar (1)	Sydney
14:00	Bilic 24'; Antelmi 71'; Trifiro 105'	Report	Danzaki 13'; Austin 63' (pen.)	Stadium: Sydney United Sports Centre; Attendance: 3,177; Referee: Adam Kersey

14 September 2022	Oakleigh Cannons (2)	2–5	Macarthur FC (1)	Melbourne
19:30	Guest 24'; Dekker 81'	Report	Dávila 44', 64' (pen.); Arzani 45+4', 55' (pen.); Hollman 58'	Stadium: Jack Edwards Reserve; Attendance: 5,200; Referee: Lachlan Keevers

== Final ==
1 October 2022
19:45 AEST

Sydney United 58 (2)	0–2	Macarthur FC (1)
	Report	Toure 32' (pen.); Dávila 90' (pen.)

CommBank Stadium, Sydney
Attendance: 16,641
Referee: Daniel Elder

== Individual honours ==
The recipient of the Michael Cockerill Medal to recognise the tournament's standout National Premier Leagues performer was Joe Guest from Oakleigh Cannons. Ulises Dávila from Macarthur FC won the Mark Viduka Medal for the player of the match in the final.

== Top goalscorers ==
Rank	Player	Club	Goals
1	(Australia) Al Hassan Toure	Macarthur FC	5
2	(Australia) Liam Boland	Avondale FC	4
2	(England) Joe Guest	Oakleigh Cannons	4
4	(Australia) Daniel Arzani	Macarthur FC	3
4	(Mexico) Ulises Dávila	Macarthur FC	3
4	(Australia) Wade Dekker	Oakleigh Cannons	3
4	(Chinese Taipei) Yuta Hirayama	Brisbane City	3
4	(Australia) Lachlan Rose	Macarthur FC	3
4	(New Zealand) Ben Waine	Wellington Phoenix	3
10	12 players	Various	2

Note: Goals scored in preliminary rounds not included.

== Broadcasting rights ==
Matches were broadcast through 10 Play and the final was shown live on Network 10.

== See also ==
- Sydney United 58 FC at the 2022 Australia Cup
