= 2022 Dockerty Cup =

2022 FV Dockerty Cup
Tournament details
- Country: Australia
- Teams: 211

Final positions
- Champions: Bentleigh Greens (3rd title)
- Runners-up: Oakleigh Cannons

The 2022 Dockerty Cup was a football (soccer) knockout-cup competition held between men's clubs in Victoria, Australia in 2022, the annual edition of the Dockerty Cup. Victorian soccer clubs from the National Premier Leagues Victoria divisions, State League divisions, regional, metros and masters leagues competed for the Dockerty Cup trophy.

The cup was won by Bentleigh Greens, their third title.

The competition also served as Qualifying Rounds for the 2022 Australia Cup. In addition to the three Victorian A-League clubs, the four Preliminary Round 7 winners qualified for the final rounds of the 2022 Australia Cup, entering at the Round of 32. As there was no NPL Champion in the previous year, an additional (fifth) slot was allocated to Victoria. This had the knock-on effect that an extra playoff-round was required for the final rounds.

== Format ==
Round	Clubs remaining	Winners from previous round	New entries this round	Main Match Dates
Round 1	211	none	104	11–13 Feb
Round 2	159	52	48	18–20 Feb
Round 3	109	55	24	4–11 Mar
Round 4	75	40	35	22 Mar–5 Apr
Round 5	40	40	none	13–27 Apr
Round 6	20	20	none	10–18 May
Round 7	10	10	none	6–7 Jul
Play-off	5	5	none	7–15 Jun
Semi-Finals	4	4	none	5–12 Jul
Final	2	2	none	6 Aug

== Preliminary rounds ==
Victorian clubs participated in the 2022 Australia Cup via the preliminary rounds. This was open to teams from the NPL, NPL2, NPL3, State League divisions, regional and metros leagues. Based on their divisions, teams entered in different rounds.

The five qualifiers for the final rounds were:

Australia Cup Qualifiers
Avondale FC (2)	Bentleigh Greens (2)	Green Gully (2)	Heidelberg United (2)	Oakleigh Cannons (2)

== Play-off round ==
A total of two teams took part in this stage of the competition, with the match played on 28 June.

Tie no	Home team (tier)	Score	Away team (tier)
1	Green Gully (2)	2–3	Heidelberg United (2)

== Semi finals ==
A total of four teams took part in this stage of the competition, with the matches played between 5 and 12 July.

Tie no	Home team (tier)	Score	Away team (tier)
1	Oakleigh Cannons (2)	3–2	Avondale FC (2)
2	Bentleigh Greens (2)	2–1	Heidelberg United (2)

== Final ==
6 August 2022	Oakleigh Cannons	1–2	Bentleigh Greens	Lakeside Stadium
16:00	Guest 48'	Source	Strickland 80'; Mustafa 89'
