= 2026 National Premier Leagues Victoria Men's =

National Premier Leagues Victoria
- Season: 2026
- Dates: 13 February – 19 September 2026
- Teams: 14
- Champions: Avondale FC
- FV Community Shield: Heidelberg United
- Premiers: Oakleigh Cannons
- Relegated: Bentleigh Greens; Dandenong Thunder; Green Gully
- Matches: 182
- Goals: 543 (2.98 per match)
- Top goalscorer: Bruno Fornaroli (21 goals)
- Biggest home win: Avondale FC 11–0 Dandenong Thunder; 20 Jun 2026
- Biggest away win: Bentleigh Greens 0–7 Melbourne City Youth; 8 May 2026
- Highest scoring: Avondale FC 11–0 Dandenong Thunder; 20 Jun 2026
- All statistics correct as of 19 September 2026.

The 2026 National Premier Leagues Victoria season was the 118th season of top-flight Victorian football, and the 13th since the competition was re-badged to National Premier Leagues Victoria. The season begins on the 13th of February, and ended on the 19th September.

Avondale FC are the season champions after finishing 4–3 on penalties against season premiers Oakleigh Cannons; who finished five points clear of second-placed Hume City, qualifying them for the 2026 Australian Championship.

== Teams ==
=== Team Changes ===
The following teams have changed division since the 2025 season.

==== To NPL Victoria ====
Promoted from VPL 1

- Bentleigh Greens
- Caroline Springs George Cross
- Melbourne City Youth

==== From NPL Victoria ====
Relegated to VPL 1

- Melbourne Victory Youth
- Port Melbourne
- Melbourne Knights

=== Stadiums and Locations ===
Locations of 2026 NPL Victoria clubs within metropolitan Melbourne

Team	Head Coach	Location	Stadium	Capacity
Altona Magic	Goran Lozanovski (Note: Devon Bonne is temporarily replacing Goran Lozanovski as head coach for the rest of the 2026 NPL Victoria season, as Lozanovski received a 17-game suspension, due to an incident with a referee on the 13th May, 2026.)	Melbourne (Altona North)	Paisley Park	5,000
Avondale FC	Jonatan Germano	Melbourne (Parkville)	Avenger Park	1,000
Bentleigh Greens	Adam Piddick	Melbourne (Cheltenham)	Kingston Heath Soccer Complex	3,300
Caroline Springs George Cross	Eric Vassiliadis	Melbourne (Fraser Rise)	City Vista Recreation Reserve	3,000
Dandenong City	Nick Tolios	Melbourne (Endeavour Hills)	Frank Holohan Soccer Complex	4,000
Dandenong Thunder	Ilir Qaniu (Note: Ilir Qaniu previously served as the assistant coach prior to, as well as after the departure of former head coach Adam Piddick, to the club's official announcement of his appointment on the 1st of July, 2026.)	Melbourne (Dandenong)	George Andrews Reserve	5,000
Green Gully	Andy Vargas	Melbourne (Keilor Downs)	Green Gully Reserve	10,000
Heidelberg United	John Anastasiadis	Melbourne (Heidelberg West)	Olympic Village	12,000
Hume City	Nick Hegarty	Melbourne (Broadmeadows)	Hume City Stadium	3,000
Melbourne City Youth	Alessandro Diamanti	Melbourne (Cranbourne East)	City Football Academy	1,500
Oakleigh Cannons	Chris Taylor	Melbourne (Oakleigh)	Jack Edwards Reserve	4,000
Preston Lions	Zoran Markovski	Melbourne (Reservoir)	B.T. Connor Reserve	6,500
South Melbourne	Sinisa Cohadzic	Melbourne (Albert Park)	Lakeside Stadium	12,000
St Albans Saints	Cameron Watson	Melbourne (St Albans)	Churchill Reserve	3,500

=== Managerial changes ===
Team	Outgoing manager	Manner of departure	Date of vacancy	Position in table	Incoming manager	Date of appointment
Green Gully	David Chick	Sacked	21 March 2026	14th	Andy Vargas	23 April 2026
Dandenong Thunder	Adam Piddick	Mutual Agreement	13 May 2026	11th	Ilir Qaniu	1 July 2026
South Melbourne	Siniša Cohadzić	Temporarily Sacked	30 May 2026	6th	Siniša Cohadzić	3 June 2026
South Melbourne	Siniša Cohadzić	Mutual Agreement	12 October 2026	post-season		
Bentleigh Greens	George Katsakis	Resignation	3 July 2026	12th	Adam Piddick	6 July 2026

== Regular season ==
=== League Table ===
Pos	Team	Pld	W	D	L	GF	GA	GD	Pts	Promotion, qualification or relegation
1	Oakleigh Cannons	26	16	6	4	56	24	+32	54	Qualification to Australian Championship and Finals series
2	Hume City	26	15	4	7	51	36	+15	49	Qualification to Finals series
3	Avondale FC (Note: Team pre-qualified to the Australian Championship as a foundation club.) (C)	26	15	2	9	65	34	+31	47	Qualification to Finals series
4	South Melbourne	26	13	2	11	39	36	+3	41	Qualification to Finals series
5	Heidelberg United	26	11	7	8	42	34	+8	40	Qualification to Finals series
6	Preston Lions	26	15	6	5	41	19	+22	39 (Note: Preston Lions were deducted six points, due to conduct in a previous fixture during the 2025 NPL Victoria preliminary final. Preston were also deducted another three points due to fan conduct occurring during a league fixture with South Melbourne on 18 July 2026. Further sanctions were announced on 19 August, with Preston receiving an additional three point deduction, which came into effect on 28 August.)	Qualification to Finals series
7	Caroline Springs George Cross	26	9	11	6	35	34	+1	38	
8	Dandenong City	26	11	6	9	35	31	+4	35 (Note: Dandenong City were deducted four points due to conduct during the 2025 National Premier Leagues Victoria final.)	
9	St Albans Saints	26	9	7	10	36	43	−7	34	
10	Melbourne City Youth (Note: Team is ineligible to qualify for the 2026 Australian Championship as the youth team of an A-League club.)	26	8	6	12	42	42	0	30	
11	Altona Magic	26	7	7	12	28	42	−14	28	
12	Bentleigh Greens (R)	26	6	6	14	27	51	−24	24	Relegation to Victorian Premier League 1
13	Green Gully (R)	26	4	5	17	23	52	−29	17	Relegation to Victorian Premier League 1
14	Dandenong Thunder (R)	26	4	3	19	23	65	−42	15	Relegation to Victorian Premier League 1

Source: Dribl
Rules for classification: 1) points; 2) goal difference; 3) number of goals scored; 4) aggregate head-to-head results; 5) away goals; 6) alphabetical order/coin toss at the end of the season.
(C) Champions; (R) Relegated

=== Matches ===
Home \ Away	ALT	AVO	BEN	CSG	DAN	DTH	GGL	HEI	HUM	MCY	OAK	PRE	SMB	SAL
Altona Magic	—	0–2	0–2	1–1	1–0	2–4	1–1	0–0	1–3	0–3	0–2	1–0	1–2	0–1
Avondale FC	5–1	—	4–0	3–2	4–1	11–0	5–0	2–1	2–0	3–1	1–1	2–3	0–2	1–1
Bentleigh Greens	0–1	2–0	—	0–0	2–1	2–1	4–0	2–2	1–5	0–7	0–0	1–1	1–5	2–4
Caroline Springs George Cross	1–1	3–2	0–0	—	3–2	2–1	0–0	0–3	2–4	1–0	1–1	0–2	1–0	2–1
Dandenong City	2–0	3–1	3–0	0–0	—	0–1	2–1	4–1	1–1	2–4	1–1	0–0	0–2	2–1
Dandenong Thunder	0–2	0–1	2–1	2–3	0–3	—	1–1	0–1	1–3	1–1	0–5	0–1	3–0	2–2
Green Gully	1–3	0–2	3–0	0–2	0–3 (Note: Originally played as a 0–0 draw. Football Victoria later determined that Dandenong City was awarded a 3–0 forfeit victory on an unknown date.)	3–1	—	0–1	1–1	1–3	0–5	0–4	0–1	1–2
Heidelberg United	2–2	2–1	2–0	0–0	1–2	4–2	2–1	—	4–5	1–1	0–1	0–1	4–0	1–1
Hume City	1–3	3–0	1–0	3–2	0–0	3–1	3–2	2–1	—	1–0	0–1	3–2	1–1	0–1
Melbourne City Youth	1–1	2–3	2–6	1–1	0–1	2–0	1–2	2–2	0–1	—	1–1	0–3	0–3	5–0
Oakleigh Cannons	3–1	2–0	4–0	2–1	2–3	2–0	4–1	2–3	3–2	3–1	—	1–3	1–2	2–2
Preston Lions	1–1	2–1	1–0	1–1	1–0	3–0	2–2	0–1	2–1	4–0	0–1	—	0–3	3–0
South Melbourne	2–3	0–4	1–0	0–4	4–2	1–0	1–2	2–1	1–2	1–2	0–3	0–0	—	2–0
St Albans Saints	2–1	2–3	1–1	2–2	0–0	6–0	1–0	2–1	3–2	0–2	1–3	0–1	0–4	—

Source: Dribl
Legend: Blue = home team win; Yellow = draw; Red = away team win.

== Finals series ==
=== Bracket ===
Elimination finals
3	South Melbourne	2
6	Heidelberg United	1
4	Avondale	2
5	Preston Lions	0

Preliminary finals
1	Oakleigh Cannons	2
3	South Melbourne	1
2	Hume City	2
4	Avondale	3

Grand final
1	Oakleigh Cannons	0 (3)
4	Avondale	0 (4)

=== Elimination Finals ===
5 September 2026
14:00 AEST

Avondale FC	2–0	Preston Lions
Carpenter 21'; Green 37'	Report

Avenger Park, Parkville
Referee: Lucas Mattia
6 September 2026
17:00 AEST

South Melbourne	2–1	Heidelberg United
Juach 17' (pen.), 21'	Report	Bramwell 14'

Lakeside Stadium, Albert Park
Referee: Adam Bavcar

=== Preliminary Finals ===
11 September 2026
20:00 AEST

Oakleigh Cannons	2–1	South Melbourne
Strong 11'; Guest 62'	Report	Yoo 29'

Jack Edwards Reserve, Oakleigh
Referee: Michael Ouliaris
12 September 2026
18:15 AEST

Hume City	2–3	Avondale FC
Debele 46'; Coyne 90+4'	Report	Carpenter 22', 28'; Trajceski 87'

John Ilhan Memorial Reserve, Broadmeadows
Referee: Yanni Mallidis

=== Grand Final ===
19 September 2026
15:30 AEST

Oakleigh Cannons	0–0 (a.e.t.)	Avondale FC
	Report
Penalties
Joe Guest (penalty missed); Cameron McGilp (penalty scored); Conor Hampson (penalty missed); Alex Salmon (penalty scored); Joe Knowles (penalty scored)	3–4	(penalty scored) Bruno Fornaroli; (penalty scored) Emlyn Wellsmore; (penalty scored) Murphy Bennett; (penalty missed) Saad Moukachar; (penalty scored) Kristian Trajceski

Lakeside Stadium, Albert Park
Referee: Adam Bavcar

== Statistics ==
Last updated 29 August 2026 (round 26).

=== Goals ===
Rank	Player	Team	Goals
1	Bruno Fornaroli	Avondale FC	21
2	Roland Ballah	Melbourne City Youth	14
2	Maki Petratos	Bentleigh Greens	14
4	Adisu Bayew	Hume City	12
4	Adem Duratovic	Oakleigh Cannons	12
6	Leo Mazis	Caroline Springs George Cross	11

=== Discipline ===
==== Yellow Cards ====
Rank	Player	Team	Yellow Cards
=1	Jamie Latham	Dandenong City	8
=1	Anthony Leban	St Albans Saints	8
=2	Kur Kur	Green Gully	7
=2	Kalilou Kamara	Bentleigh Greens	7
=2	Aaron Anderson	St Albans Saints	7
=2	Jack Webster	Dandenong City	7

==== Red Cards ====
Rank	Player	Team	Red Cards
1	Diego Cuba	Green Gully	2
2	15 players		1
