= Patrick Flottmann =

Australian soccer player (born 1997)

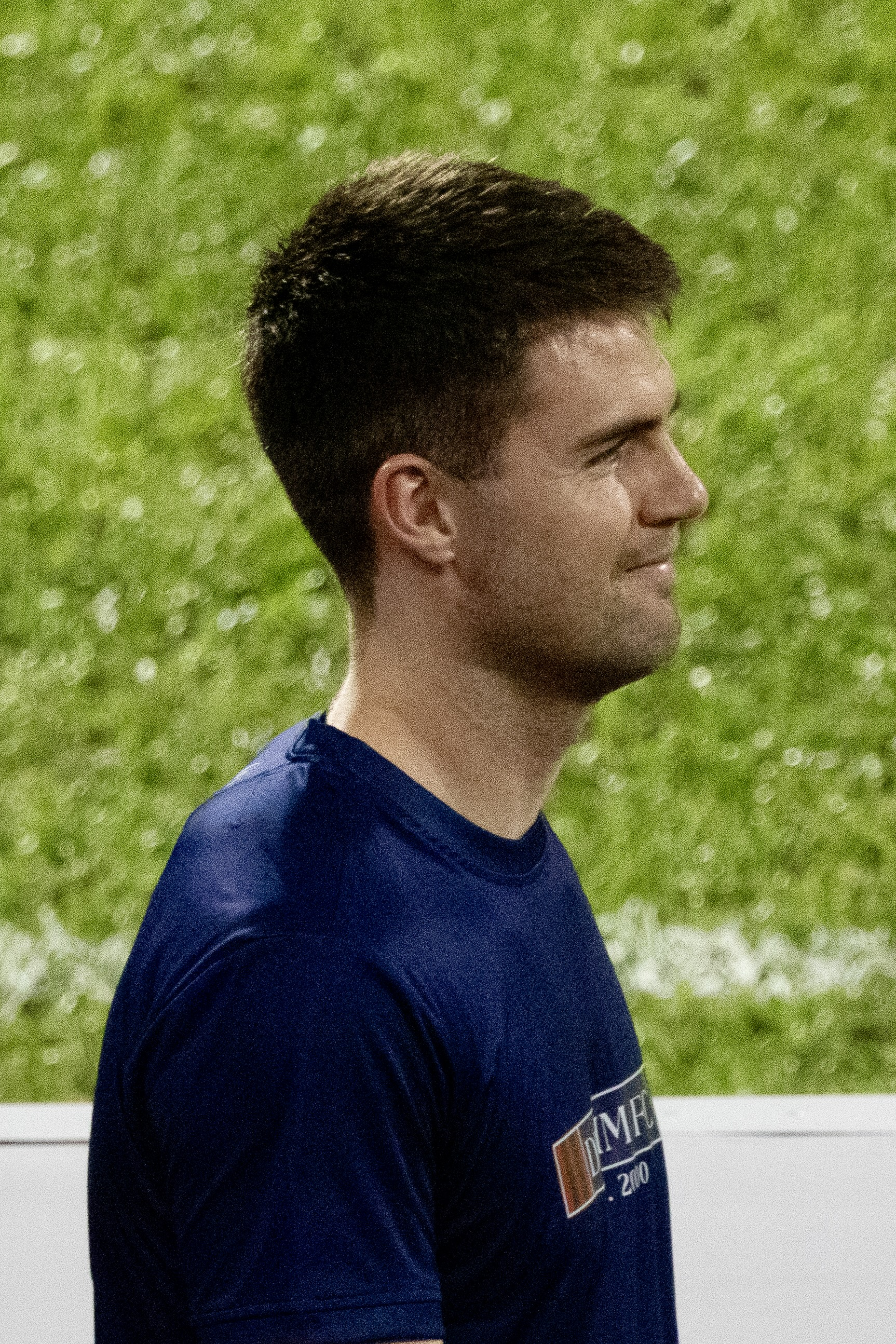
- Flottmann with DPMM in 2024

Personal information
- Full name: Patrick Stacey Murnane Flottmann
- Date of birth: 19 April 1997 (age 29)
- Place of birth: St Leonards, Australia
- Height: 1.91 m (6 ft 3 in)
- Position: Centre-back

Team information
- Current team: Avondale FC
- Number: 4

Youth career
- –2015: Blacktown City
- 2016–2017: Sydney FC

Senior career*
Years	Team	Apps	(Gls)
2016–2018	Sydney FC NPL	67	(2)
2017–2018	Sydney FC	0	(0)
2018–2019	Air Force United	17	(0)
2019–2021	Sydney FC	4	(0)
2020–2021	Sydney FC NPL	7	(3)
2021	→ Brisbane Roar (loan)	4	(0)
2021–2022	NorthEast United	15	(1)
2023	Seongnam FC	22	(2)
2024	DPMM FC	2	(0)
2025	APIA Leichhardt	5	(0)
2026–	Avondale	16	(3)

International career^{‡}
2015–2016	Australia U20	3	(0)
Medal record
Men's football
Representing Australia
AFF U-19 Youth Championship
First place	2016 Vietnam	U-20 Team
- * Club domestic league appearances and goals as of 26 June 2026 ‡ National team caps and goals as of 5 January 2020

Patrick Stacey Murnane Flottmann (born 19 April 1997) is an Australian professional soccer player who plays for Avondale FC as a defender.

== Personal ==
Flottmann attended Turramurra High School and played on their soccer team as the vice-captain.

== Club career ==
=== Air Force United ===
In January 2018, Flottmann left Sydney FC due to lack of game time and signed with Thai League 2 club Air Force United. He played 17 matches during his season at Air Force United.

=== Return to Sydney FC ===
Flottmann returned to his youth club, Sydney FC in July 2019, signing a 2-year senior contract. He made his debut on 29 December 2019 against Melbourne City, coming on as a substitute to replace Adam Le Fondre in the 88th minute. On 28 April 2021, he was loaned to Brisbane Roar for a couple of weeks to provide injury cover for Tom Aldred. In July 2021, Sydney FC announced that they had released Flottmann.

=== NorthEast United ===
In November 2021, Flottmann signed with Indian Super League club NorthEast United. He made his debut against Kerala Blasters FC on 25 November. He scored his first goal on 17 December in a 2–0 win against East Bengal.

=== Seongnam FC ===
On 1 February 2023, Flottmann joined K League 2 club Seongnam FC. He played in 22 matches and scored 2 goals

=== DPMM FC ===
On 9 April 2024, Flottmann was signed by Brunei DPMM FC for the 2024–25 Singapore Premier League season. He made his debut from the starting lineup on 11 May 2024 against Young Lions in a 1–2 away victory where he created an assist for Yura Yunos to score the winner of the game on the 38th minute.

Flottmann suffered a ruptured anterior cruciate ligament in a friendly match a month later which ultimately ended his stint at the Bruneian club.

=== APIA Leichhardt ===
On 20 July 2025, National Premier Leagues NSW side APIA Leichhardt FC announced the signing of Flottmann. His stay with the club from Sydney ended in early January 2026.

=== Avondale ===
Flottmann subsequently signed for Avondale FC, reigning premiers of the NPL Victoria for the 2026 season.

== Career statistics ==
As of match played 28 February 2026

Club	Season	League			Cup		Continental		Other		Total	
Club	Season	Division	Apps	Goals	Apps	Goals	Apps	Goals	Apps	Goals	Apps	Goals
Sydney FC	2017–18	A-League	0	0	0	0	0	0	0	0	0	0
Air Force United	2019	Thai League 2	17	0	2	0	0	0	0	0	19	0
Sydney FC	2019–20	A-League	3	0	0	0	3	0	0	0	6	0
Sydney FC	2020–21	A-League	1	0	0	0	0	0	0	0	1	0
Sydney FC	Total		4	0	0	0	3	0	0	0	7	0
Sydney FC Youth	2020–21	National Premier Leagues NSW	1	0	0	0	0	0	0	0	1	0
Brisbane Roar FC (loan)	2020–21	A-League	4	0	0	0	0	0	0	0	4	0
NorthEast United FC	2021–22	Indian Super League	15	1	0	0	0	0	0	0	15	1
Seongnam FC	2023	K League 2	22	2	2	0	0	0	0	0	24	2
DPMM FC	2024–25	Singapore Premier League	2	0	0	0	0	0	0	0	2	0
APIA Leichhardt FC	2025	National Premier Leagues NSW	5	0	0	0	0	0	0	0	5	0
Avondale FC	2026	National Premier Leagues Victoria	3	0	0	0	0	0	0	0	3	0
Career total			73	3	4	0	0	0	0	0	77	3

== International career ==
In September 2015, Flottmann was called up to the Australian under-20 squad for the 2016 AFC U-19 Championship qualification, but he did not make an appearance in Australia's 3 matches. A year later, he was selected for the Australian under-20 squad for the 2016 AFF U-19 Youth Championship in Vietnam. He made 3 appearances in the group stage, playing in the 2–0 victory over Cambodia, the 3–1 victory over Indonesia, and the 1–5 loss to Thailand.

== Honours ==
=== International ===
Australia U20

- AFF U-19 Youth Championship: 2016
