= Siniša Cohadzić =

Australian soccer manager (born 1975)

- Cohadzić with South Melbourne in 2026

Personal information
- Full name: Siniša Antoan Cohadzić
- Date of birth: 22 November 1975 (age 50)
- Place of birth: Australia

Team information
- Current team: Avondale (head coach)

Managerial career
- Years: Team
- 2012–2013: Ballarat Red Devils
- 2014: Ashburton United women
- 2016–2019: Alamein FC
- 2023–2024: Philippines U17 women
- 2025–2026: South Melbourne
- 2026–: Avondale

Siniša Antoan Cohadzić (born 22 November 1975) is an Australian soccer manager who currently serves as the head coach of Avondale FC. He has coached in Australian men's and women's football and has held coaching roles within the Philippines women's national-team programme.

Cohadzić became South Melbourne's senior men's head coach during the 2025 season. During his first year in charge, South Melbourne won the Dockerty Cup and the inaugural Australian Championship. In 2026 he guided the club to victory in the 2026 Australia Cup, and to the final of the inaugural OFC Professional League.

== Managerial career ==
=== Early career and women's football ===
Cohadzić coached the Ballarat Red Devils before moving into women's football in Victoria.

In 2014, he was appointed coach of Ashburton Women's Soccer Club. At the time of his appointment, he held UEFA/AFC A Licence qualifications and a Football Federation Australia football conditioning qualification. He later coached Alamein FC in the National Premier Leagues Victoria Women. Whilst coaching Alamein (2016 to 2019), his record was 62 wins, 13 draws and 35 losses.

=== Philippines ===
Cohadzić became involved with the Philippines women's national-team programme in 2023. As head coach of the Philippines women's under-17 team, Cohadzić guided the side through qualification for the 2024 AFC U-17 Women's Asian Cup. In September 2023, the Philippines defeated Vietnam 1–0 to qualify for the tournament for the first time. Cohadzić remained head coach for the final tournament in Indonesia in May 2024, where the team finished third in its group (failing to advance to the semi-final round).

=== South Melbourne ===
Cohadzic served as technical director at South Melbourne before becoming senior men's head coach. The club stated that he had spent five years as technical director and had also coached its under-23 side. On 5 May 2025, South Melbourne appointed Cohadzic as senior head coach for the remainder of the 2025 NPL Victoria season following the departure of Esteban Quintas. Following Cohadzić's appointment, South Melbourne's results improved.

South Melbourne won the 2025 Dockerty Cup, defeating Heidelberg United 2–1 in the final. Later in 2025, South Melbourne competed in the inaugural Australian Championship. Cohadzić guided the club to the final, where South Melbourne defeated Marconi Stallions 2–0 to become champions. The title was South Melbourne's first national championship in 26 years.

Cohadzić coached South Melbourne during the inaugural OFC Professional League season in 2026. The club reached the competition's final. South Melbourne scored 55 goals in 19 matches during the competition and recorded an 8–1 victory against Tahiti United.

In May 2026, South Melbourne announced Cohadzić's departure, but this was overturned days later, after reaching an agreement for him to return as senior head coach.

On 10 October 2026, Cohadzić led South Melbourne to Australia Cup glory, becoming the first non A-League side to win it. Two days after the cup triumph, South Melbourne announced that Cohadzić had left the club.

=== Avondale ===
On the same day as his departure from South Melbourne, Avondale announced Cohadzić had signed for the club.

== Honours ==
=== Manager ===
South Melbourne

- 2025 Australian Championship winners
- 2025 Dockerty Cup winners
- 2026 OFC Professional League runner-up
- 2026 Australia Cup winners
