= 2024 Dockerty Cup =

Tournament details
- Country: Australia
- Dates: 9 February 2024 – 3 August 2024
- Teams: 211

Final positions
- Champions: South Melbourne FC (9th title)
- Runners-up: Oakleigh Cannons

The 2024 Dockerty Cup was a football (soccer) knockout-cup competition held between men's clubs in Victoria, Australia in 2024, the annual edition of the Dockerty Cup. Victorian soccer clubs from the National Premier Leagues Victoria divisions, State League divisions, regional, metros and masters leagues competed for the Dockerty Cup trophy.

The cup was won by South Melbourne, their ninth title.

The competition also served as Qualifying Rounds for the 2024 Australia Cup. In addition to the three Victorian A-League clubs, the four Preliminary Round 7 winners qualified for the final rounds of the 2024 Australia Cup, entering at the Round of 32. As there was no NPL Champion in the previous year, an additional (fifth) slot was allocated to Victoria. This had the knock-on effect that an extra playoff-round was required for the final rounds.

== Format ==
| Round | Clubs remaining | Winners from previous round | New entries this round | Main Match Dates |
|---|---|---|---|---|
| Round 1 | 219 | none | 135 | 9–12 Feb |
| Round 2 | 162 | 78 | none | 23–26 Feb |
| Round 3 | 123 | 39 | 47 | 8–11 Mar |
| Round 4 | 80 | 43 | 37 | 27 Mar–10 Apr |
| Round 5 | 40 | 40 | none | 22 Apr–1 May |
| Round 6 | 20 | 20 | none | 14–28 May |
| Round 7 | 10 | 10 | none | 11–18 Jun |
| Play-off | 5 | 5 | none | 3 Jul |
| Semi-Finals | 4 | 4 | none | 16 Jul |
| Final | 2 | 2 | none | 3 Aug |

== Preliminary rounds ==
Victorian clubs participated in the 2024 Australia Cup via the preliminary rounds. This was open to teams from the NPL Victoria, VPL 1, VPL 2, State League divisions, regional and metros leagues. Based on their divisions, teams entered in different rounds.

The five qualifiers for the final rounds were:

Australia Cup Qualifiers
| Heidelberg United (2) | Hume City (2) | FC Melbourne Srbija (4) | Oakleigh Cannons (2) | South Melbourne (2) |

== Play-off round ==
A total of two teams took part in this stage of the competition, with the match played on 3 July.

| Tie no | Home team (tier) | Score | Away team (tier) |
|---|---|---|---|
| 1 | Heidelberg United (2) | 1–2 | South Melbourne (2) |

== Semi finals ==
A total of four teams took part in this stage of the competition, with the matches played between 16 July.

| Tie no | Home team (tier) | Score | Away team (tier) |
|---|---|---|---|
| 1 | South Melbourne (2) | 1–0 | Hume City (2) |
| 2 | Oakleigh Cannons (2) | 1–0 | FC Melbourne Srbija (4) |

== Final ==
The Grand Final would be played on 3 August 2024, at the Home of the Matildas in Bundoora. The match was played between Oakleigh Cannons and South Melbourne. Maximilian Mikkola would be sent off in the match. the game would finish 0-0 after the completion of extra time. South Melbourne would go on to win the match on penalties with a score of 5-4.

Grand Final
3 August 2024
15:00 AEST (UTC+10:00)

| Oakleigh Cannons | 0–0 (a.e.t.) | South Melbourne |
|---|---|---|
| | | Mikkola (red card) |
Penalties
| | 4–5 |

Home of the Matildas, Melbourne
