= Alen Harbas =

Australian professional soccer player (born 2004)

Personal information
- Date of birth: 26 February 2004 (age 22)
- Place of birth: Sydney, Australia
- Height: 1.90 m (6 ft 3 in)
- Position: Forward

Team information
- Current team: Sutherland Sharks
- Number: 9

Youth career
- Liverpool Rangers FC
- 2017–2018: Mounties Wanderers
- 2018–2021: Blacktown City
- 2021–2025: Sydney FC

Senior career*
Years	Team	Apps	(Gls)
2021	Blacktown City	1	(0)
2022–2025	Sydney FC NPL	38	(15)
2023–2024	→ KTP (loan)	34	(6)
2025–2026	Chalkanoras Idaliou	24	(5)
2026–	Sutherland Sharks	0	(0)
- * Club domestic league appearances and goals as of 7 November 2026

Alen Harbas (born 26 February 2004) is an Australian soccer player who plays as a forward for NPL NSW Men's club Sutherland Sharks.

== Career ==
=== Sydney FC ===
Harbas started his career with Blacktown City and made his debut during the preliminary rounds of the FFA Cup in 2021. He scored his first senior goal in a 4–2 win over Blacktown Spartans in the sixth round of the cup. For the 2022 season, Harbas was announced in the youth teams of A-League Men club Sydney FC, and played in the under-20 team that won the league in his age group. He was then registered in the NPL NSW Men's squad for the 2023 season.

After three straight losses following their opening round victory, Harbas scored two consecutive braces in the wins against Bulls FC Academy on 5 March, and Central Coast Mariners a week later. On 24 March, he scored his fifth goal of the season and the winner in a 1–0 win against Blacktown City. On 7 April, his sixth came in a 2–1 win against Wollongong Wolves, and would later continue his form to finish with nine goals by July. He finished as the top goal scorer for the club, despite leaving mid-way of the season, as his side ended in sixth on the table.

==== Loan to KTP ====
In July 2023, Harbas was sent on loan to Finnish Veikkausliiga club KTP on an 18-month deal. On 30 July, Harbas made his debut off the bench in a 2–0 league loss to KuPS.

== Career statistics ==
As of 7 November 2026

Appearances and goals by club, season and competition
Club	Season	League			National cup (Note: Includes FFA Cup, Suomen Cup, and Cypriot Cup)		Other (Note: Includes Australian Championship and Ykkösliigacup)		Continental		Total	
Club	Season	Division	Apps	Goals	Apps	Goals	Apps	Goals	Apps	Goals	Apps	Goals
Blacktown City	2021	NPL NSW	1	0	1	1	–		–		2	1
Sydney FC	2022	NPL NSW	3	1	–		–		–		3	1
Sydney FC	2023	NPL NSW	22	9	–		–		–		22	9
Sydney FC	2025	NPL NSW	13	5	–		–		–		13	5
Sydney FC	Total		39	15	1	1	0	0	0	0	40	16
KTP (loan)	2023	Veikkausliiga	7	0	0	0	0	0	–		7	0
KTP (loan)	2024	Ykkösliiga	27	6	3	7	4	1	–		34	14
KTP (loan)	Total		34	6	3	7	4	1	0	0	41	14
Chalkanoras	2025–26	Second Division	24	5	1	0	–		–		25	5
Sutherland Sharks	2026	NPL NSW	0	0	0	0	4	1	–		4	1
Career total			97	26	4	8	8	2	0	0	109	36

== Honours ==
KTP

- Ykkösliiga: 2024
