= Australian Championship =

Australian men's soccer competition

- Organising body: Football Australia
- Founded: 12 February 2025; 21 months ago
- First season: 2025
- Country: Australia
- Number of clubs: 16
- Level on pyramid: 2
- Current champions: South Melbourne (1st title) (2025)
- Broadcaster: SBS
- Website: australianchampionship.com.au
- Current: 2026 Australian Championship

The Australian Championship is a men's soccer league in Australia involving teams in the second tier of the Australian soccer league system. Organised by Football Australia, it is held annually at the end of the second-tier National Premier Leagues (NPL) season, as a spring tournament with a sixteen-team group stage followed by a knockout stage. The competition pits eight permanent NPL clubs (known as "Foundation clubs") against the eight NPL premiers from the concluding season. Its first edition took place in 2025.

The competition's focus is to improve player development and to boost the overall standing of the game in Australia, by generating new interest and revenue. There are aspirations for this competition to eventually become a stand-alone home and away league.

The winner is also awarded a direct qualification spot for the Australia Cup.

== History ==
=== National Second Division ===
Although informally talked about for many years within the Australian football community, momentum for the idea of a national second division increased in October 2016. In March 2017 "The Association of Australian Football Clubs (AAFC) Limited" was established, with the goal of opening dialogue with Football Australia (at that time called Football Federation Australia, or FFA) and various other stakeholders about establishing a national second division. The board consisted of several members representing their respective states and was chaired by Nick Galatas. In January 2018 the AAFC released a timeline for implementation of the competition, requesting expressions of interest from clubs for participation in a competition names "The Championship".

In February 2019, the AAFC announced they were of the belief that the competition could be up and running by the 2020–21 season. On 3 June 2019 the new national second division was given the green light by FFA, paving the way for the next stage of planning and a revised start date of the 2021–22 season. On 15 September 2020, a provisional list of 35 "partner clubs" was released to the public. The official partners included National Premier League clubs from every state in Australia. In October 2020, Football Australia released the "XI Principles for the future of Australian football", also known as Vision 2035, which specifically categorised the creation of a second-tier division as part of soccer restructuring.

In a January 2021 report, the AAFC claimed that the establishment of a national second division competition would be affordable and feasible. During the development phase, the potential competition was known as the "National Second Division" (NSD) or the "National Second Tier". In May 2021, Football Australia chairman Chris Nikou declared that he was "expecting [an NSD model] to come to the Football Australia board in the second half of this year, and [would] love to see a second division up for the 2022–23 season". In late 2021, Football Australia CEO James Johnson pointing to the pandemic as a hurdle to the NSD's unavoidable progression. The NSD would feature 12 foundation clubs with plans to expand up to 16 within the first four years. Officials also considered avoiding the American-based franchise system, expressing hope that it would become more aligned to a European format which included promotion and relegation.

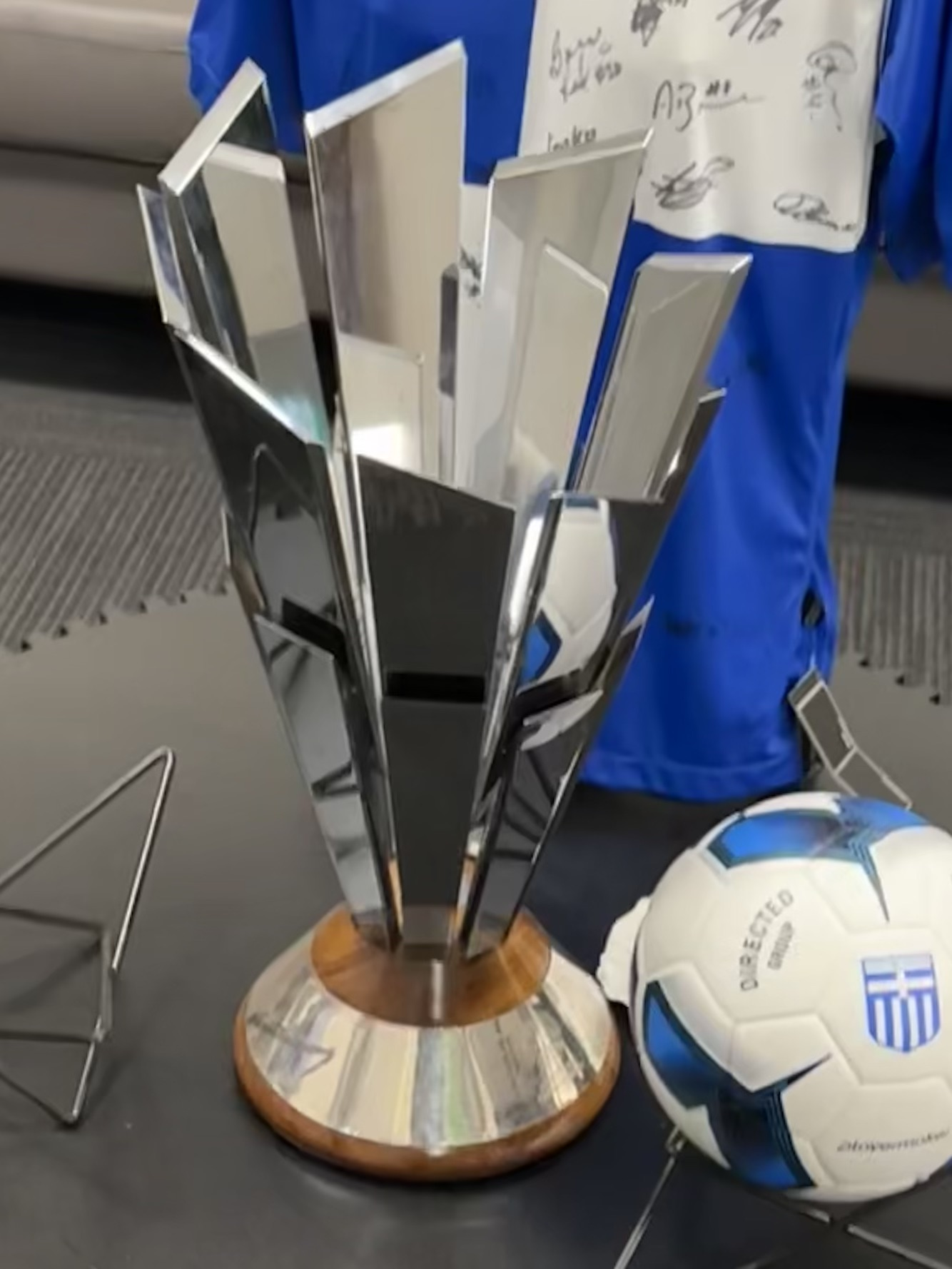
The Australian Championship trophy at Lakeside Stadium in 2026

In February 2022, a report titled "A Genuine National Second Division of Football in Australia" was released, funded by the Partner Clubs. AAFC believed it was time for a merit-based competition structure to be introduced, which occurs in most competitions around the world. AAFC Chairman Nick Galatas commented that "all the pieces are there for a National Second Division competition for Australian football and the time to implement is now". The original reluctance to start the tournament by 2022 was met with criticism due to a lack of detail about how the competition would function.

In 2022, Football Australia was working towards March 2024 as its preferred start date, with expressions of interest sought in February 2023. At that point a "Champions League" format was proposed by Football Australia, but opposed by the AAFC, where top teams would play in the national competition concurrently with their regional NPL league. In March 2023, the bidding phase concluded, with 32 teams having entered bids; a total of 26 teams were accepted to progress to a formal proposal, then evaluation of bids by late November 2023. The first season was to commence in March or April 2025, with teams playing a full home and away season.

After the announcement of the eight inaugural teams, Football Australia announced the Second Division would feature ten or twelve teams, with a double round-robin format (18 or 22 matches) followed by a Finals Series towards the conclusion of the regular season.

=== Inaugural format as a post-season competition ===
On 29 January 2024, Football Australia announced that the final selection process for the final clubs had begun with 24 undisclosed teams, with the first season of the competition as a post-season competition for the selected NPL clubs in October 2025,

In February 2025 announced the competition would be named the "Australian Championship".

Although the competition is not yet separate from the NPL structure (teams in the Australian Championship still play in the following season's NPL competitions), there are aspirations for this competition to eventually become a stand-alone home and away league if the current format proves to be sustainable.

== Format ==
The current format of the competition consists of 16 teams, running from October to December each year. The 16 teams include eight "Foundation Clubs" and eight other National Premier Leagues clubs (who qualified as the regular-season premiers of their respective NPL competitions). In the group stage, teams are divided into four groups of four. Groups are played as a double round robin (six matches per team) with the top-two teams in each group advancing. The knockout stage consists of three rounds with single leg matchups, with the semi-final and final venues selected by Football Australia.

== Clubs ==
=== Foundation clubs ===
Locations of foundation clubs in Sydney (top) and Wollongong (bottom).
Locations of foundation clubs in Melbourne.

It was announced in November 2023 that eight teams had been selected as foundation clubs for the inaugural competition.

Qualified as	Team	City	Home ground	Cap.
Foundation clubs	Avondale FC	Melbourne	Avenger Park	2,500
Foundation clubs	Marconi Stallions	Sydney	Marconi Stadium	9,000
Foundation clubs	Preston Lions	Melbourne	B.T. Connor Reserve	9,000
Foundation clubs	South Melbourne	Melbourne	Lakeside Stadium	12,000
Foundation clubs	Sydney Olympic	Sydney	Sydney Olympic Park Athletic Centre	5,000
Foundation clubs	Sydney United 58	Sydney	Sydney United Sports Centre	12,000
Foundation clubs	Wests APIA	Sydney	Lambert Park	7,000
Foundation clubs	Wollongong Wolves	Wollongong	Macedonia Park, Berkeley	5,000

=== Other current clubs (2026) ===
Qualified as	Team	City	Home ground	Cap.
NPL SA Premiers	Adelaide City	Adelaide	Adelaide City Park	5,000
NPL WA Premiers	Bayswater City	Perth	Frank Drago Reserve	5,000
NPL Northern NSW Premiers	Broadmeadow Magic	Newcastle	Magic Park	3,500
NPL Capital Football Premiers	Canberra Croatia	Canberra	Deakin Stadium	1,500
NPL Queensland Premiers	Lions FC	Brisbane	Lions Stadium	5,000
NPL Victoria Premiers	Oakleigh Cannons	Melbourne	Jack Edwards Reserve	4,000
NPL Tasmania Premiers	South Hobart	Hobart	D'Arcy Street	1,500
NPL NSW Fourth place	Sutherland Sharks	Sydney	Seymour Shaw Park	5,000

=== Previous applicants or withdrawn bids for Foundation clubs ===
Team	Ref.
Adelaide City	(Note: Teams that passed the technical elements of the formal Request for Proposal process, after submitting expressions of interest to join.)
Bentleigh Greens	
Blacktown City	
Brisbane City	
Brisbane United merger	(Note: The Brisbane United merger initially comprised the Brisbane Strikers, Virginia United and Wynnum Wolves teams.)
Brunswick Juventus	
Canberra Croatia	
Caroline Springs George Cross FC	
Cockburn City	
Football SA merger	(Note: The Football SA merger consisted of the Campbelltown City, North Eastern MetroStars and West Torrens Birkalla teams.)
Fraser Park FC	
Gold Coast Knights	
Gold Coast United FC	
Green Gully SC	
Gungahlin United FC	
Heidelberg United FC	(Note: Did not pass the technical elements of the formal Request for Proposal process.)
Melbourne Knights FC	
Olympic FC	
Peninsula Power	
Playford City Patriots	
Rockdale Ilinden FC	
Gold Coast United FC	
South Hobart FC	
Sunshine Coast Fire	
Sutherland Sharks	
Valentine FC	

== Broadcasting ==
On 18 September 2025, Football Australia announced a partnership with SBS to broadcast all matches live and free in Australia across SBS, SBS2, and SBS On Demand. 17 of 55 matches are broadcast on terrestrial television (SBS and SBS2) with all matches available for streaming on SBS On Demand. Additionally, the final stages of the competition will be broadcast via PacificAus TV in the Pacific Islands region.

== Corporate relations ==
=== Sponsorship ===
The official ball supplier is Mitre Sports International.

== See also ==
- Australian soccer league system
- List of soccer clubs in Australia
- A-League Men
- A-League Women
