= Frank Holohan Soccer Complex =

Association football stadium in Melbourne, Victoria

- Interactive map of Frank Holohan Soccer Complex
- Location: Endeavour Hills, Victoria, Australia
- Coordinates: 37.9599°S 145.2377°E
- Owner: City of Greater Dandenong
- Capacity: 4,000 (400 seating capacity)
- Surface: Grass

Construction
- Opened: 1980

Tenant
- Dandenong City SC

Frank Holohan Soccer Complex is an Australian association football stadium located in Endeavour Hills, a south-east suburb of Melbourne, Victoria. It is the home ground of NPL Victoria side Dandenong City. It maintains a capacity of 4,000, of which 400 are seated in the grandstand, completed in 2014. It is named for former City of Dandenong mayor and councillor, Frank Holohan.

Alongside the main ground, the Complex comprises two adjacent pitches for training and junior matches, changerooms, a club room, and a canteen.

In 2021, the venue hosted some Melbourne City W-League matches, following the club's relocation to south-east Melbourne.
