= Oakleigh Cannons FC =

Australian soccer club

Oakleigh Cannons
- Full name: Oakleigh Cannons Football Club
- Nickname: The Cannons
- Founded: 12 December 1972; 53 years ago
- Ground: Jack Edwards Reserve
- Capacity: 4,000
- Chairman: Kon Kavalakis
- Head coach: Chris Taylor
- League: NPL Victoria
- 2026: 1st of 14 (premiers)
Home colours	Away colours

Oakleigh Cannons Football Club is an Australian soccer club based in the south-east Melbourne suburb Oakleigh. As of 2026, the club competes in the National Premier Leagues Victoria (NPL Victoria). They will also compete in the 2026 Australian Championship after finishing premiers in the regular season of NPL Victoria in the 2026 season.

== History ==
South Oakleigh Soccer Club was established by members of Oakleigh's Greek Australian community on 12 December 1972. The club soon changed its name to Oakleigh Soccer Club.

In the 1970s and 1980s, the club steadily gained success by winning a number of Victorian Provisional, Metropolitan and State League divisional titles.

The club won championships in both of its first two years of competition, taking out the Victorian District League East in 1973 and 1974. Oakleigh won its next title in 1978, when it took out the Victorian District League Division 1, winning promotion to the Victorian Provisional League Division 2, which it won in its first year in 1979, achieving promotion to Provisional League Division 1.

The club achieved three successive promotions in 1981, 1982 and 1983, taking the club from the Victorian Provisional League Division 1 to Victorian Metropolitan League Division 4, 3 and subsequently 2. The club won back-to-back titles in 1985 and 1986, the latter title granting them Victorian State League (later rebranded to the Victorian Premier League and then National Premier Leagues Victoria) status for the first time. The club finished 12th in their first season in Victoria's top flight of football.

The club was re-branded Oakleigh Cannons S.C. in the 1990s to expand its appeal beyond its predominantly Greek Australian support base. The club changed its name again to Oakleigh Cannons Football Club and gained promotion to the Victorian Premier League in 2003. The club finished runners up in their first season back in the top flight in 2004, but lost to both Bulleen Zebras and Altona Magic in the finals series. In the 2005 season, the club finished in 5th place to again qualify for the finals series, beating Fawkner-Whittlesea in the elimination final but then losing to Heidelberg United FC in the semi-final.

The club won its first VPL Premiership in 2006, finishing 12 points clear at the top of the table. Disappointingly, the club lost to Altona Magic in the qualifying final and Heidelberg United in the semi-final. The club again made the finals series in 2007, but lost to Melbourne Knights FC in the semi-final, making it four successive years of finals disappointment for the South East club.

Led by Arthur Papas, Oakleigh just missed out on the 2011 championship title, won by Green Gully SC on goal difference after both sides finished the season with 43 points. Oakleigh made the grand final that year, facing up against minor premiers Green Gully, but lost 3–2 after extra time, with Hamid Basma scoring the winner in the 95th minute. Oakleigh again made the grand final in 2012, playing against Dandenong Thunder SC at AAMI Park in Melbourne. They lost 2–1 after Nate Foster scored an 81st-minute winner for Thunder.

Five games into the 2013 season, Oakleigh sacked manager Bill Theodoropoulos and brought in former Gold Coast United FC manager Miron Bleiberg.

=== National Premier Leagues Victoria ===
In early 2014, it was announced that Oakleigh would be a part of the newly formed NPL Victoria, which was to replace the old Victorian Premier League. Oakleigh Cannons finished runners-up in their first season in the new competition, seven points behind South Melbourne FC.

In March 2015, high-profile manager Miron Bleiberg departed the club and Oakleigh returned Arthur Papas from his stint in India. Oakleigh began to rise up off the bottom of the ladder and qualified for the 2015 FFA Cup. Oakleigh also managed to make the final of the Dockerty Cup, but lost to South Melbourne at Lakeside Stadium. The Club finished in 11th place in the league, unable to overcome their poor form from early on in the season, despite big name signings including Mirjan Pavlovic, Matthew Foschini, Sean Rooney and Kofi Danning. Their FFA Cup form was much better, though. Oakleigh draw Queensland NPL side Far North Queensland in the Round of 32 and progressed after winning a penalty shoot-out. In the Round of 16, Oakleigh draw North Eastern MetroStars away from home, and won 1–0 thanks to a Pavlovic strike in South Australia. Oakleigh then drew fellow NPL Victoria side Hume City in the quarter-finals, but went down 3–2 after extra time at ABD Stadium in front of 1,500 fans.

Late in September 2015, coach Arthur Papas resigned. Peter Tsolakis and Con Tangalakis were appointed as joint head coaches for the 2016 season.

In 2017, Oakleigh finished sixth in the league, beating Avondale FC on penalties in the elimination final before losing to Heidelberg United in the semi-final. Dusan Bosnjak scored 17 goals, the second highest total in the league, second only to Heidelberg's Kenny Athiu. In 2018, the Cannons finished in fifth place in the league. Oakleigh beat Pascoe Vale in the elimination final but then went out to eventual champions Heidelberg on penalties in the semi-final.

In 2019, Oakleigh managed just 5 points in its first 10 games, seeing the club languish in bottom place. However, the Cannons went the next 16 games undefeated with 12 wins and 4 draws to finish the home-and-away season in 3rd place. In the finals series, Oakleigh beat Hume City 2–0 before going down 2–0 to Avondale. New signing Joe Guest won the NPL Victoria Gold Medal.

In 2021 the State Government announced a $4 million upgrade to Jack Edwards Reserve.

=== Season by Season History ===
Season	Division	P	W	D	L	F	A	Pts	Pos	Finals	Australia Cup / Dockerty cup
Season	League									Finals	Australia Cup / Dockerty cup
2008	Victorian Premier League	26	10	7	9	28	24	37	7th	DNQ	No National Cup
2009	Victorian Premier League	22	9	6	7	24	22	33	7th	DNQ	No National Cup
2010	Victorian Premier League	22	9	3	10	30	31	30	7th	DNQ	No National Cup
2011	Victorian Premier League	24	13	4	7	41	29	43	2nd	RU	No National Cup
2012	Victorian Premier League	22	12	4	6	36	26	40	2nd	RU	No National Cup
2013	Victorian Premier League	22	7	4	11	33	37	25	8th	DNQ	No National Cup
2014	NPL Victoria	26	18	5	3	61	19	59	2nd	DNQ	Fourth Round
2015	NPL Victoria	26	7	5	14	33	41	26	11th	DNQ	Australia Cup: Quarter Final Dockerty Cup: Runner Up
2016	NPL Victoria	26	14	5	7	48	36	47	4th	RU	Fifth Round
2017	NPL Victoria	26	11	10	5	43	23	43	6th	SF	Sixth Round
2018	NPL Victoria	26	12	2	12	41	39	38	4th	SF	Sixth Round
2019	NPL Victoria	26	13	6	7	45	32	45	2nd	SF	Seventh Round
2020	NPL Victoria	5	3	1	1	11	6	10	2nd	Canceled due to the COVID-19 pandemic	
2021	NPL Victoria (2021 games)	18	10	4	4	36	21	34	1st	N/A	Seventh Round
2021	NPL Victoria (2022 games)	8	5	1	2	15	9	16	1st	N/A	Seventh Round
2021	NPL Victoria (Total)	26	15	5	6	51	30	50	1st	N/A	Seventh Round
2022	NPL Victoria	26	16	3	7	58	29	51	3rd	W	Australia Cup: Semi Final Dockerty Cup: Runner Up
2023	NPL Victoria	26	18	4	4	64	25	58	3rd	SF	Australia Cup: Round of 32 Dockerty Cup: Winner
2024	NPL Victoria	26	16	5	5	53	28	53	3rd	W	Australia Cup: Quarter Finals Dockerty Cup: Runner Up
2025	NPL Victoria	0	0	0	0	0	0	0	TBD	TBD	Sixth Round

== Honours ==
- Victorian Premier League/National Premier Leagues Victoria
  - Championship: 2022, 2024
  - Premiership: 2006, 2021, 2026
  - Runners-up: 2011, 2012
- Victorian State League Division 1
  - Championship: 1986, 1999, 2003
  - 9 x Victorian State League Premierships
- Dockerty Cup
  - Champions: 2023
  - Runners-up: 2015, 2022, 2024

== Individual honours ==
- NPL Victoria Gold Medal
  - 2025 – Joe Guest
  - 2022 – Joe Knowles
  - 2019 – Joe Guest
- NPL Victoria Men's Golden Boot
  - 2024 – Alex Salmon
  - 2007 – Esala Masi
- VPL Coach of the Year
  - 2011 – Arthur Papas
- VPL Goalkeeper of the Year
- 2011 – Griffin Mcmaster
- 2004 – Adrian Cagalj
- Weinstein Medal
  - 1983 – Con Kiakos

NPL Victoria Men's Goal of the year

- 2018 – Dean Piemonte

== Current squad ==
As of 15 October 2026

Note: Flags indicate national team as defined under FIFA eligibility rules; some limited exceptions apply. Players may hold more than one non-FIFA nationality.

No.	Pos.	Nation	Player
1	GK	AUS	Zac Bowling
2	DF	AUS	Brodie Boyce
3	DF	ENG	Connor Hampson
4	DF	AUS	Jordon Hall
5	DF	AUS	Jacob Tratt
6	MF	AUS	Noah Holmes
7	FW	AUS	Mark Leonard
8	MF	AUS	Cameron McGilp
9	FW	ENG	Alex Salmon
10	MF	ENG	Joe Guest
11	FW	AUS	Adem Duratovic
13	DF	AUS	Brandon Giaccherini
14	MF	AUS	Kingsley Sinclair

No.	Pos.	Nation	Player
15	MF	NZL	Campbell Strong
16	DF	AUS	Tyson Martin
17	MF	AUS	James Georgiou
20	FW	AUS	Rory Lennon
21	GK	AUS	Thomas Manos
22	DF	AUS	Joseph Forde
23	MF	AUS	Harry Arnison
24	FW	AUS	Arion Sulemani
25	FW	AUS	Roy Gregory
28	FW	AUS	Joe Knowles
—	MF	AUS	Luke Mensink
—	FW	AUS	Roy Gregory
—	GK	AUS	Lachlan Hart

=== Staff ===
Head coach:

- Chris Taylor

Assistant coaches:

- Luis Gorgulho
- Craig Smart

Goalkeeper coach:

- Bojo Jevdjevic

Strength and conditioning coach:

- Tim Schleiger

Head physio:

- Shaq Paligaru

Team manager:

- Fraser Back and Ryder Taylor

Director of Football:

- Aki Ionnas
- Johnny Ioannou
