= Kristian Trajceski =

South Sudanese footballer (born 2000)

Personal information
- Full name: Kristian Steve Trajceski
- Date of birth: 15 November 1998 (age 27)
- Place of birth: Wollert Australia
- Height: 1.74 m (5 ft 9 in)
- Position: Attacking midfielder

Team information
- Current team: Avondale FC
- Number: 23

Youth career
- Lalor United Sloga F.C
- Epping City SC
- Whittlesea Ranges FC
- -2017: Hume City FC

Senior career*
Years	Team	Apps	(Gls)
2015–2017	Hume City FC	27	(3)
2017	Avondale FC	17	(1)
2017–2018	G.D. Gafanha	16	(3)
2018–2020	Oliveira do Hospital	46	(3)
2021–	Avondale FC	89	(21)

International career^{‡}
2018	Macedonia U-21	5	(0)
- * Club domestic league appearances and goals as of 7 September 2025 ‡ National team caps and goals as of 21 November 2023

Kristian Trajceski (Macedonian: Кристиан Трајчески, (born 15 November 1998)) is a Macedonian–Australian professional association football player, who currently plays for Avondale FC in the National Premier Leagues Victoria. He has represented the Republic of Macedonia at U-21s level.

== Club career ==
=== Early career ===
Trajceski broke through into the Hume City FC senior squad at just 17, having come through the ranks of a handful of local Victorian clubs. Despite being one of the youngest players in the squad, he made 22 appearances in the league. His performances earned him a spot in the PS4 Player Pathway Award, judged by former Socceroos players including John Kosmina, Ante Milicic, Robert Stanton and Craig Foster. Trajceski would go on to win the award, earning him a 2-week trial with A-League Men club Sydney FC.

Despite proving himself well at Sydney FC, and being offered a spot in the Academy and A-League Youth team, Trajceski rejected the offer of his first professional contract, citing he had aspirations of playing professionally abroad in Europe.

=== European ambitions ===
To follow his aspirations of playing professionally in Europe, Trajceski moved to Portugal and signed with G.D. Gafanha in the Campeonato de Portugal. Following a successful season, in which he made sixteen appearances and earned a call-up to the Macedonia U-21s, he moved to F.C. Oliveira do Hospital, alongside fellow Australian Danny Choi.

=== Return to Australia ===
After almost 4 years in Portugal, Trajceski returned to Australia, signing with his former club Avondale FC in the Victorian NPL helping the club to win the Dockerty Cup later that season, and the 2023 National Premier Leagues Victoria Championship.

During the 2024 season, Trajceski broke his ankle badly in a match against Dandenong Thunder when former Central Coast Mariners player Jordan Smylie performed a dangerous Sliding tackle on Trajceski mid-way through the first half. The tackle earned Smylie a direct red card, and was later handed a 9-match suspension by Football Federation Victoria which was considered to be one of the heaviest suspensions in the leagues history.

== International career ==
Whilst playing in Portugal, Trajeceski was called up to the Macedonia U-21s for the 2019 UEFA European Under-21 Championship qualifications.
