= Jack Edwards Reserve =

Stadium in Oakleigh, Victoria, Australia

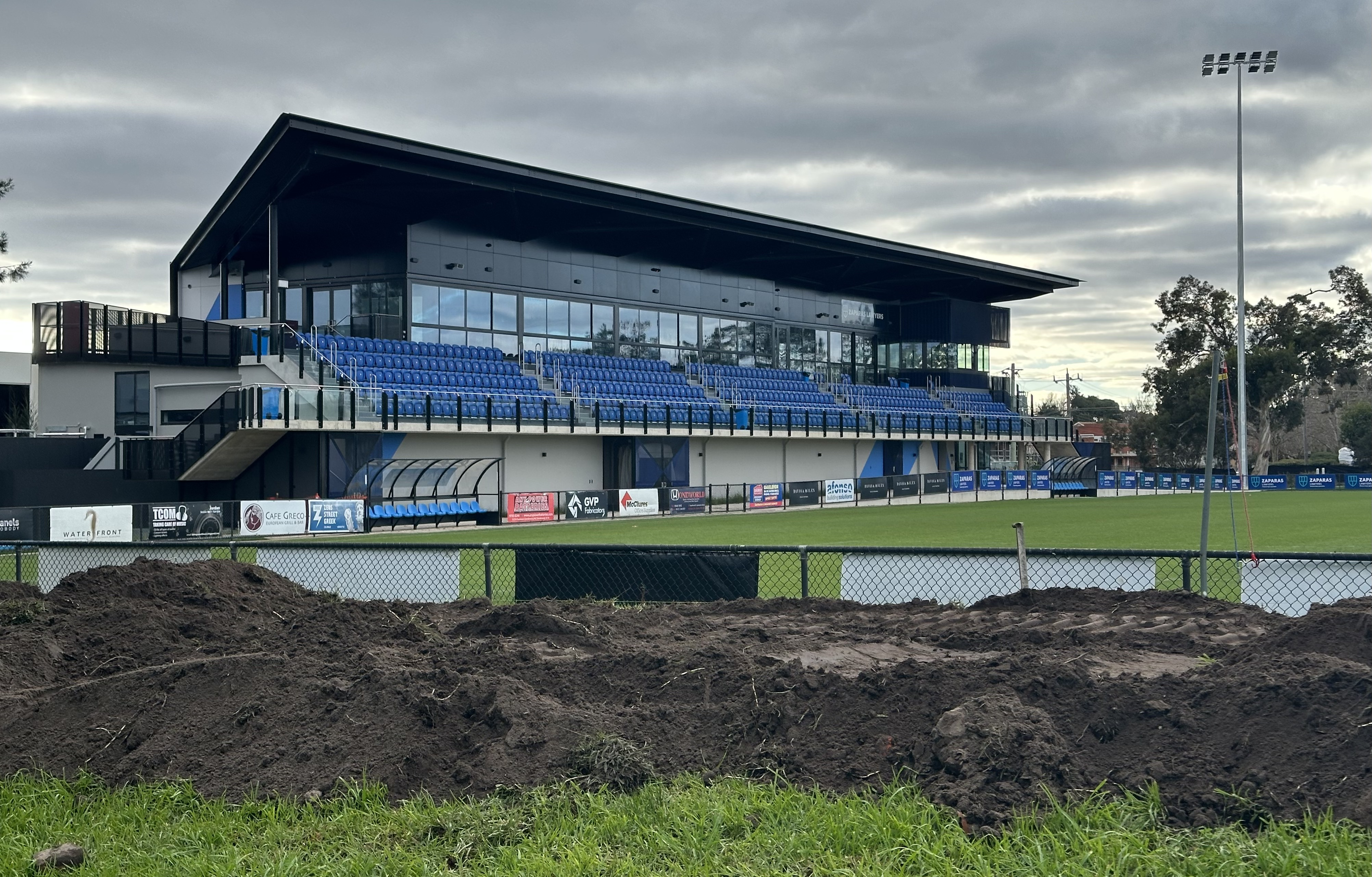
- The main grandstand in July 2026
- Interactive map of Jack Edwards Reserve
- Location: Oakleigh, Victoria
- Coordinates: 37°54′22″S 145°5′55″E
- Owner: City of Monash
- Capacity: 4,000 (1,000 seated)
- Surface: Grass
- Record attendance: 5,200 (Oakleigh Cannons vs Macarthur FC, 14 September 2022)
- Public transit: ● ● Huntingdale

Tenant
- Oakleigh Cannons

Jack Edwards Reserve is an Australian soccer ground in Oakleigh, a suburb of Melbourne, Victoria. It is the home of Oakleigh Cannons FC. The ground has two seated grandstands with seating for approximately 1,000 patrons, located on the eastern and western wings of the ground respectively. The western grandstand was opened in September 2025 as part of a $14.7 million upgrade of the reserve.

Jack Edwards Reserve has a capacity of 4,000. The ground is situated at 22 Edward Street, Oakleigh and is the site of football matches for the Oakleigh's senior men's, women's and junior teams, in the National Premier Leagues and Australia Cup.
