= Avondale FC =

Soccer club based in Melbourne, Victoria

- Nickname: Avengers
- Founded: 1984 (42 years ago)
- Ground: Avenger Park; Parkville, Victoria
- Capacity: 2,500
- Owner: Italian Community of Keilor Assoc
- Coach: Sinisa Cohadzic (men's)
- League: NPL Victoria (men's)
- 2026: 3rd of 14 (champions)
- Website: avondalefc.com.au
Home colours	Away colours

Avondale FC, nicknamed the Avengers, is a football club based in the suburb of Parkville in Melbourne, Victoria, and owned by the Italian Community of Keilor Assoc (ICKA). Its senior men's and women's teams play in the National Premier Leagues Victoria and Victoria Women, both in the second tier of the Australian league system. It also competes in the Australian Championship as a foundation club. It plays its home games at the 2,500-capacity Avenger Park.

One of many Italian Australian football clubs in Victoria, it was founded in Keilor as Keilor ICKA in 1984, and inhabited Football Victoria's lower leagues throughout the next two decades. It rebranded as Avondale Heights SC following a move to Avondale Heights in 2000. From 2009 to 2014, the club rapidly ascended the Victorian league system, winning five promotions in six seasons to reach the first division, where it has remained since. The club adopted its current name in 2015, and moved to Parkville in 2018. Its women's team was founded in 2019, and won promotion to the first division in 2025.

Avondale have won one Victorian men's title, one women's title, and one Dockerty Cup. Its best performance in the Australia Cup is a semi-final appearance in 2025.

== History ==
=== Early years ===
Avondale FC was founded in 1984 as Keilor I.C.K.A.. ICKA stood for Italian Community of Keilor Assoc Inc. (I.C.K.A. Club), the football team having been founded originally by Italian immigrants.

Keilor ICKA competed in the Victorian Amateur League Division 3 in 1986, and achieved two consecutive promotions in '86 and '87 to rise to the Amateur League Division 1 by '88. Keilor competed in the Provisional Leagues for the first time in 1991, with the federation placing the club into Victorian Provisional League Division 4 that year, the ninth tier of football in Victoria. The club was promoted the following year, a third-place finish enough to see the club rise to Provisional League Division 3. Keilor was to spend the next eight years at that level.

After moving to Doyle Street Reserve in Avondale Heights in 1999, the club was renamed to Avondale Heights SC in 2000. That year proved to be a memorable one for the Melbourne club, finally achieving promotion to Provisional League Division 2 North-West, by taking out the Division 3 North-West title, losing just one game all season. The next year was even better, with the club taking out the Div 2 Nth-West title in their first season at that level, finishing five points clear at the top of the table ahead of Mill Park.

Avondale Heights' next promotion was to come in 2006, when the club finished second in the Provisional League Division 1 North-West. This promotion meant that the club would compete in the Victorian State Leagues for the first time, entering State League Division 3 North-West for the 2007 season. Devastatingly, the club were relegated on the final game of the 2007 season, finishing just one point of survival. The club endured another relegation the following season, falling to the sixth tier of Victorian football for the 2008 season.

=== League ascension ===
A famous climb through the league divisions began in 2009 when a new committee took over the management of the club. Avondale managed a second-place finish in the Provisional League Division 2 North-West, enough for promotion. Avondale was promoted once more the following season, the club again finishing second, this time in the Provisional League Division 1 North-West.

In 2012, Avondale Heights appointed Anthony Barbieri as head manager of the senior side. They were promoted from State League 3 North-West to State League 2 North-West after topping their league table and taking out the Championship, pipping Sydenham Park SC by just one point. In 2013, the club were promoted from State League 2 in their first season in the competition, then from the third division of football in Victoria, after winning a playoff against North Geelong Warriors 1–0.

=== National Premier Leagues Victoria ===
In 2014, Avondale Heights entered the second tier of football in Victoria, the National Premier Leagues Victoria 2, for the first time ever. Avondale went on to win the league championship and earn promotion into the NPL Victoria top division. The club achieved five promotions in six seasons to reach the top flight, a feat that is unrivaled in Victorian football.

Avondale Heights Soccer Club changed its name to Avondale Football Club in 2015. The club grabbed headlines around Victoria in May 2015 when it confirmed the signings of former A-League players Francesco Stella and Massimo Murdocca. In their first season in the top flight of Victorian football, the club managed to avoid relegation, finishing mid-table.

Avondale announced that it had signed two more former A-League players in Spase Dilevski and Jonatan Germano for the 2016 season. Avondale adopted the moniker The Avengers in early 2016 and announced it would be playing home matches for the 2016 season out of Knights Stadium. On the park, it was a difficult season early on for Avondale, who lost its opening five fixtures. A draw against Oakleigh Cannons was followed up by three consecutive victories, but inconsistent form throughout the season, which included another five match losing streak followed by closing out the season eight games undefeated, saw Avondale finish in 8th place for 2016. Jonatan Germano was a clear standout for Avondale, netting 14 goals from midfield including five braces.

In 2017 Avondale qualified for the NPL Victoria finals series for the first time, continuing the club's rise. Avondale even led the league by Round 19, but a stretch of four matches without a win saw Heidelberg United and South Melbourne surpass them in the standings. Avondale faced Oakleigh Cannons in the Elimination Final, losing 2–1 in extra time. Germano was once more the side's top goalscorer, with eight goals. Avondale conceded the fewest goals of any side in the league but also scored fewer goals than all but the two bottom-placed sides, North Geelong Warriors and St Albans Saints.

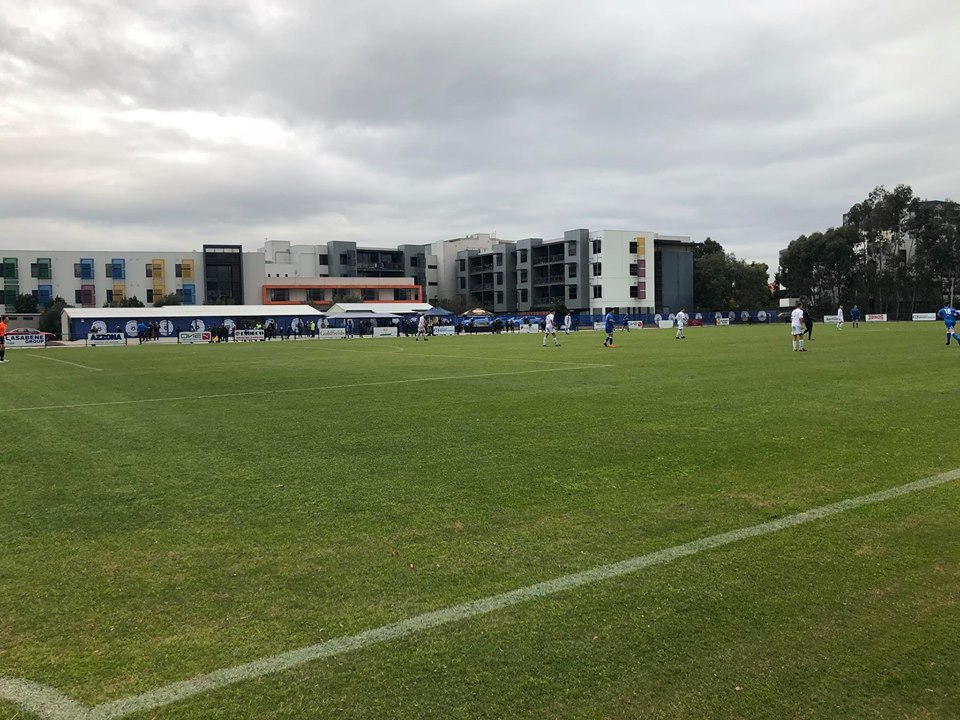
The Reggio Calabria Club soccer pitch, re-opened for use by Avondale in June 2018.

In December 2017, the club announced that it had signed a 10-year lease with the Reggio Calabria Club in Brunswick to become the new home base for the club. Avondale played its 2018 home games at Paisley Park Soccer Complex prior to the move. In June 2018, Avondale moved into its new home ground in Parkville, Victoria, newly-named Avenger Park. Avondale announced that the club would be completing new change-rooms, a kiosk, medical center, gym, members sports bar and a 450-seat grandstand at the venue.

Avondale bolstered its offensive unit with the signings of Joseph Katebian, Kaine Sheppard, Stefan Zinni, Elvis Kamsoba and Liam Boland in the off-season. In May 2018, Avondale qualified for the 2018 FFA Cup national stages after a 4–1 victory over Richmond, the first time in its history it had made the national stages of the Cup. Drawing former National Soccer League side and four-time Australian national champion Marconi Stallions in the Round of 32, Avondale defeated its opponents 4–1 at ABD Stadium. Avondale progressed to the Quarter Finals when it defeated Devonport Strikers 4-1 and drew A-League champions Sydney FC. Despite coming back from 2-0 down at half-time, Avondale took the game to extra-time and were eventually defeated 4–2 in front of 1,566 people, the club's largest ever attendance.

In the league, Avondale finished in 3rd place in 2018, its highest position to date. In the finals series, they defeated Port Melbourne 3–1 at Avenger Park before staging an incredible comeback at Kingston Heath Soccer Complex against Bentleigh Greens, scoring three goals in the last five minutes of extra time, taking the tie from 3–1 to Bentleigh to 4–3 to Avondale, securing their first ever NPL grand final appearance. In the Grand Final, Avondale went down 2–1 to Heidelberg United at AAMI Park. Two of Avondale's stand-out players joined A-League sides after the season, with Sheppard moving to Newcastle Jets and Kamsoba signing for Melbourne Victory.

At the conclusion of the season, after seven seasons at the helm of the club, senior head coach Anthony Barbieri departed Avondale. His assistant coach, Zoran Markovski, was named as his successor in December 2018. In his playing days, Markovski was a two-time National Soccer League championship winning defender with Melbourne Croatia. Avondale started the season with 7 consecutive league wins, remained undefeated until Round 13 and led the league for most of the season. Poor form in the latter stages of the season, including a 3–2 loss to Heidelberg in the second-last round of the regular season saw the Avengers slip to 2nd place. Liam Boland won the league Golden Boot with 22 goals, while Tasuku Sekiya won the Bill Fleming Media Award. In the finals series, Avondale beat Oakleigh 2-0 before going down on penalties to Bentleigh in the Grand Final at AAMI Park.

==== NPL Licence Breaches ====
One day prior to the start of the 2020 season, Football Victoria announced that Avondale FC breached conditions of its NPL Licence in 2018 and 2019. Subsequently, the club was fined $25,000, deducted 3 points for the 2020 NPL Victoria season, awarded a suspended $25,000 fine and 18-point deduction for the 2020 season, retrospectively deducted 18 points for the 2018 and 2019 seasons and required to pay back all prize-money awarded in 2018 and 2019.

The 2020 season was cancelled after five rounds due to the COVID-19 pandemic in Australia.

==== 2021 Suspended Season ====
The season was disrupted due to the impacts from the COVID-19 pandemic in Australia, with the season being cancelled in September. Avondale was on top of the ladder at the time, but no Premier was declared. However, as a result of a court challenge involving Avondale and Football Victoria, it was agreed that eight rounds of games from the 2022 NPL Season would also count towards the 2021 NPL league table, enabling sufficient matches to be played to "complete" the season, and be able to declare a Premier. Oakleigh went on to win the notional 2021 league title.

The 2022 season was a disappointment for Avondale, who finished one spot outside the finals places in 7th, the club's lowest finish since 2016.

==== 2023 First Premiership and Championship ====
On 16 August 2023, second-placed South Melbourne lost 2-1 to Heidelberg United in a catch up round, leaving South five points behind Avondale with one game to go and securing Avondale's first ever National Premier Leagues Victoria premiership title. Avondale secured its first ever NPL Championship in the finals series, defeating South Melbourne 4-0 at Olympic Village in the NPL Victoria grand final.

==== Australian Championship era from 2025 ====
Avondale FC announcement officially play in Australian Championship from October 2025 after submitting in Australian Professional League and club founder from eight teams on 20 November 2023. They will continue to play in the NPL Victoria for the 2024 and 2025 season, before transitioning to the new league following season.

== Current squad ==
As of 19 September, 2026

Note: Flags indicate national team as defined under FIFA eligibility rules; some limited exceptions apply. Players may hold more than one non-FIFA nationality.

No.	Pos.	Nation	Player
1	GK	AUS	Jack Gibson
2	DF	WAL	Murphy Bennett
3	DF	AUS	Jacob Muir
4	DF	AUS	Patrick Flottmann
5	DF	AUS	Matthew Reid
6	DF	AUS	Marcus Ferkranus
7	FW	AUS	Adam Zimarino
9	FW	NZL	George Ott
11	FW	AUS	Maxx Green
12	DF	SRI	Ayman Zawahir
13	MF	AUS	Yitay Towns
14	MF	AUS	Blake Carpenter

No.	Pos.	Nation	Player
15	MF	AUS	Dylan Atanasovski
16	MF	AUS	Paolo Gottoli
17	MF	AUS	Ayouk Mow
18	MF	JPN	Keitatsu Kojima
19	DF	AUS	Brandon Lundy
20	DF	AUS	Dillon Jakupi
21	DF	CIV	Adama Traoré
22	FW	AUS	Stefan Valentini
23	MF	MKD	Kristian Trajceski
24	DF	NZL	Emlyn Wellsmore
25	FW	AUS	Patrick Wall
33	MF	MRI	Leon Alizart
40	GK	AUS	Lewis Alvarez

== Honours ==
=== State ===
- National Premier Leagues Victoria
  - Champions (2): 2023, 2026
- National Premier Leagues Victoria
  - Premiers (2): 2023, 2025
- Dockerty Cup
  - Winners (1): 2021
- NPL Victoria 1/NPL Victoria 2
  - Champions (1): 2014
- Victorian State League 3 NW
  - Champions (1): 2012

== Women's football ==
Avondale fielded a senior women's team for the first time in 2019, entering a side in the Victorian Women's State League 4 West competition. Avondale clinched the league title after round 14 after 14 consecutive victories, and ended the season with 16 wins from 16 games, scoring 110 and conceding just 4 goals. In the State League 4 finals, Avondale beat RMIT FC 9-0 and Port Melbourne SC on penalties to complete an "Invincibles" season.

In 2026, the women's team won their first NPLW Victoria championship after coming from behind to defeat reigning champions Box Hill United 2-1. The team went unbeaten in the second half of the season, recording 13 wins and 3 draws in their last 16 games including finals. This also marks the best result for a newly promoted team in NPLW Victoria history. Subsequently, this also completed an NPL Victoria championship double for Avondale FC, who became the first team in Victorian history to win the men's and women's championships in the same season.
