= 2025 Australian Championship =

First edition of the Australian Championship

Australian Championship
- Season: 2025
- Dates: 10 October – 6 December
- Champions: South Melbourne (1st title)
- Matches: 55
- Goals: 177 (3.22 per match)
- Top goalscorer: Ali Auglah (6 goals)
- Biggest home win: Heidelberg United 6–1 South Hobart (26 Oct); Wollongong Wolves 5–0 Marconi Stallions (5 Nov); Heidelberg United 6–1 North Eastern MetroStars (22 Nov)
- Biggest away win: Wollongong Wolves 0–3 Heidelberg United (18 Oct); Canberra Croatia 1–4 Avondale FC (1 Nov)
- Highest attendance: 6,825 (South Melbourne v Sydney Olympic; 10 Oct)
- Lowest attendance: 272 (Broadmeadow Magic v Sydney Olympic; 16 Nov)
- Total attendance: 91,503
- Average attendance: 1,664

The 2025 Australian Championship was the first edition of the Australian Championship, a national second-tier soccer competition for men, held after the finish of the 2025 National Premier Leagues Men's season. The tournament consisted of six home-and-away matches in four groups for teams in the group stage, culminating in a knockout finals series, running from 10 October and concluding on 6 December.

South Melbourne became the inaugural champions after defeating Marconi Stallions in the final.

== Teams ==
Locations of clubs in Sydney and Wollongong (top), Melbourne (middle), and the rest of Australia (bottom).

● Foundation clubs, ● NPL qualifiers

Sixteen clubs participated in the inaugural edition. Eight clubs gained automatic qualification as the competition's Foundation clubs, while the other eight qualified via the 2025 National Premier Leagues Men's competitions, as premiers of their respective leagues. Because Avondale FC, as the 2025 NPL Victoria premiers, had already qualified as a foundation club, their berth went to the league's second-placed team Heidelberg United.

Qualified as	Team	City	Home ground	Cap.
Foundation clubs	Avondale FC	Melbourne	Avenger Park	2,500
Foundation clubs	Marconi Stallions	Sydney	Marconi Stadium	9,000
Foundation clubs	Preston Lions	Melbourne	B.T. Connor Reserve	9,000
Foundation clubs	South Melbourne	Melbourne	Lakeside Stadium	12,000
Foundation clubs	Sydney Olympic	Sydney	Jubilee Stadium	20,500
Foundation clubs	Sydney United 58	Sydney	Sydney United Sports Centre	12,000
Foundation clubs	Wests APIA	Sydney	Leichhardt Oval	20,000
Foundation clubs	Wollongong Wolves	Wollongong	Collegians Sports Centre	5,000
NPL WA Premiers	Bayswater City	Perth	Frank Drago Reserve	3,000
NPL Northern NSW Premiers	Broadmeadow Magic	Newcastle	Magic Park	3,500
NPL Capital Football Premiers	Canberra Croatia	Canberra	Deakin Stadium	1,500
NPL Victoria Runners-up	Heidelberg United	Melbourne	Olympic Park	12,000
NPL Queensland Premiers	Moreton City Excelsior	Brisbane	Perry Park	5,000
NPL SA Premiers	North Eastern MetroStars	Adelaide	T.K. Shutter Reserve	2,000
NPL NSW Premiers	NWS Spirit	Sydney	Christie Park	1,500
NPL Tasmania Premiers	South Hobart	Hobart	D'Arcy Street	1,500

== Group stage ==
The draw for the group stage was conducted on 1 May. Four of the foundation clubs (APIA Leichhardt, Avondale, Marconi Stallions and South Melbourne) were seeded into Position 1 of each group.

The group stage was played from 10 October to 16 November.

All times listed are local time.

=== Group A ===
Pos	Team	Pld	W	D	L	GF	GA	GD	Pts	Qualification	SMB	MCE	SOL	BMM
1	South Melbourne	6	5	1	0	13	6	+7	16	Finals series	—	2–0	3–2	2–0
2	Moreton City Excelsior	6	2	2	2	15	13	+2	8	Finals series	3–3	—	1–2	5–1
3	Sydney Olympic	6	2	1	3	14	14	0	7		1–2	3–3	—	2–3
4	Broadmeadow Magic	6	1	0	5	8	17	−9	3		0–1	2–3	2–4	—

Source: Football Australia
Legend: Blue = home team win; Yellow = draw; Red = away team win.

10 October 1	South Melbourne	3–2	Sydney Olympic	Melbourne
19:00 (AEDT)	Uchida 45+1'; Lavale 51'; Lampard 87'	Source	Auglah 13'; Feutz 85'	Stadium: Lakeside Stadium; Attendance: 6,825; Referee: Sam Kelly

12 October 1	Broadmeadow Magic	2–3	Moreton City Excelsior	Newcastle
13:00 (AEDT)	Baker 41'; Nancarrow 79'	Source	Scott 12', 59'; Murai 90+8' (pen.)	Stadium: Magic Park; Attendance: 1,175; Referee: Eric Saba

19 October 2	Sydney Olympic	2–3	Broadmeadow Magic	Sydney
13:00 (AEDT)	Amanda 78'; Auglah 88'	Source	Baker 18'; Palombini 64'; Cocks 86'	Stadium: Jubilee Stadium; Attendance: 1,371; Referee: Eric Saba

19 October 2	South Melbourne	2–0	Moreton City Excelsior	Melbourne
16:30 (AEDT)	Aguek 46', 87'	Source		Stadium: Lakeside Stadium; Attendance: 3,395; Referee: Jack Morgan

26 October 3	Broadmeadow Magic	0–1	South Melbourne	Newcastle
13:00 (AEDT)		Source	Uchida 39'	Stadium: Magic Park; Attendance: 539; Referee: Joshua Attard

26 October 3	Moreton City Excelsior	1–2	Sydney Olympic	Brisbane
12:00 (AEST)	Jankovic 88'	Source	Auglah 8'; Vakis 84'	Stadium: Perry Park; Attendance: 1,048; Referee: Zac Keenan

1 November 4	Sydney Olympic	1–2	South Melbourne	Sydney
15:15 (AEDT)	Auglah 31'	Source	Lampard 83'; Habib 90+3'	Stadium: Jubilee Stadium; Attendance: 1,401; Referee: Jack Morgan

2 November 4	Moreton City Excelsior	5–1	Broadmeadow Magic	Brisbane
12:00 (AEST)	Pengelly 81', 89'; Scott 15'; Kojima 17'; Murai 56'	Source	Baker 4'	Stadium: Perry Park; Attendance: 380; Referee: Tom Fell

8 November 5	Sydney Olympic	3–3	Moreton City Excelsior	Sydney
13:00 (AEDT)	Amanda 4'; Auglah 36'; Parkhouse 64'	Source	Scott 45'; Murai 80' (pen.); Jankovic 90+7'	Stadium: Jubilee Oval; Referee: Jock Quartermain

8 November 5	South Melbourne	2–0	Broadmeadow Magic	Melbourne
15:15 (AEDT)	Aguek 29'; Lampard 56'	Source		Stadium: Lakeside Stadium; Referee: Eric Saba

14 November 6	Moreton City Excelsior	3–3	South Melbourne	Brisbane
18:35 (AEST)	Kojima 14'; Smith 20'; Jankovic 75'	Source	Lavale 4'; Bonada 12'; Leech 53'	Stadium: Perry Park; Referee: Zac Keenan

16 November 6	Broadmeadow Magic	2–4	Sydney Olympic	Newcastle
13:00 (AEDT)	Cresnar 41'; Gage-Raftery 66'	Source	Feutz 5', 12'; Auglah 62'; Parkhouse 67'	Stadium: Magic Park; Referee: Calvin Berg

=== Group B ===
Pos	Team	Pld	W	D	L	GF	GA	GD	Pts	Qualification	HEI	MAR	WOL	SHO
1	Heidelberg United	6	3	3	0	15	6	+9	12	Finals series	—	1–0	2–2	6–1
2	Marconi Stallions	6	3	1	2	10	7	+3	10	Finals series	1–1	—	3–0	4–0
3	Wollongong Wolves	6	3	1	2	13	11	+2	10		0–3	5–0	—	3–2
4	South Hobart	6	0	1	5	6	20	−14	1		2–2	0–2	1–3	—

Source: Football Australia
Legend: Blue = home team win; Yellow = draw; Red = away team win.

12 October 1	Heidelberg United	1–0	Marconi Stallions	Melbourne
13:00 (AEDT)	Theodoropoulos 57'	Source		Stadium: Olympic Park; Attendance: 2,114; Referee: Declan Woods

12 October 1	South Hobart	1–3	Wollongong Wolves	Hobart
13:00 (AEDT)	Yost 41'	Source	Masciovecchio 30'; Yamamura 64'; James 90+3'	Stadium: D'Arcy Street; Attendance: 1,348; Referee: Daniel Cook

18 October 2	Marconi Stallions	4–0	South Hobart	Sydney
13:00 (AEDT)	Tsekenis 19', 47', 62'; Bayliss 73'	Source		Stadium: Marconi Stadium; Attendance: 2,107; Referee: Brodie Merchant

18 October 2	Wollongong Wolves	0–3	Heidelberg United	Wollongong
15:00 (AEDT)		Source	Ali 17'; Lesiotis 49'; Taylor 85'	Stadium: Collegians Sports Centre; Attendance: 3,077; Referee: Declan Woods

25 October 3	Marconi Stallions	3–0	Wollongong Wolves	Sydney
13:00 (AEDT)	Akio 14'; Maya 45+4' (pen.); Anderson 67'	Source		Stadium: Marconi Stadium; Attendance: 1,239; Referee: Declan Woods

26 October 3	Heidelberg United	6–1	South Hobart	Melbourne
13:00 (AEDT)	Juach 11', 28'; Bramwell 32', 39'; Taylor 4'; Fulton 45+3'	Source	Wright 88'	Stadium: Olympic Park; Attendance: 778; Referee: Tom Fell

31 October 4	Marconi Stallions	1–1	Heidelberg United	Sydney
20:35 (AEDT)	Van Der Saag 65'	Source	Humbert 71'	Stadium: Marconi Stadium; Attendance: 1,718; Referee: Jake Rose

2 November 4	Wollongong Wolves	3–2	South Hobart	Wollongong
13:00 (AEDT)	Scott 19', 74'; Madden 2'	Source	Morton 20'; Oates 45+3'	Stadium: Collegians Sports Centre; Attendance: 1,320; Referee: Matt Staples

9 November 5	South Hobart	0–2	Marconi Stallions	Hobart
13:00 (AEDT)		Source	Mlinaric 10'; Busek 73'	Stadium: D'Arcy Street; Attendance: 929; Referee: Brenton Kopra

9 November 5	Heidelberg United	2–2	Wollongong Wolves	Melbourne
13:00 (AEDT)	Humbert 10'; McGowan 73'	Source	Masciovecchio 3'; Scott 60'	Stadium: Olympic Park; Attendance: 420; Referee: Daniel Cook

15 November 6	Wollongong Wolves	5–0	Marconi Stallions	Wollongong
15:15 (AEDT)	Scott 12', 74'; Olsen 45+3'; Hernandez 48'; Russell 85'	Source		Stadium: Collegians Sports Centre; Referee: Eric Saba

16 November 6	South Hobart	2–2	Heidelberg United	Hobart
13:00 (AEDT)	Maddock 24'; Morton 64'	Source	Apostolopoulos 50'; Dau 54'	Stadium: D'Arcy Street; Referee: Noah Moss

=== Group C ===
Pos	Team	Pld	W	D	L	GF	GA	GD	Pts	Qualification	AVO	NWS	PRE	CCR
1	Avondale FC	6	3	3	0	12	6	+6	12	Finals series	—	1–0	1–1	3–1
2	NWS Spirit	6	2	2	2	8	9	−1	8	Finals series	3–3	—	1–3	2–1
3	Preston Lions	6	1	4	1	7	6	+1	7		0–0	1–1	—	0–0
4	Canberra Croatia	6	1	1	4	6	12	−6	4		1–4	0–1	3–2	—

Source: Football Australia
Legend: Blue = home team win; Yellow = draw; Red = away team win.

11 October 1	Preston Lions	1–1	NWS Spirit	Melbourne
15:00 (AEDT)	Romero 38'	Source	Jackson-Brown 90+3'	Stadium: Genis Steel Stadium; Attendance: 4,241; Referee: Jock Quartermain

12 October 1	Avondale FC	3–1	Canberra Croatia	Melbourne
16:30 (AEDT)	Fornaroli 59'; Ott 70'; Cianci 90+4'	Source	Yoshida 73'	Stadium: Avenger Park; Attendance: 1,731; Referee: Jack Morgan

19 October 2	Canberra Croatia	3–2	Preston Lions	Canberra
13:00 (AEDT)	Colbertaldo 43'; Green 57', 76'	Source	Bayew 36'; Kubilay 45+4'	Stadium: Deakin Stadium; Attendance: 1,650; Referee: Tom Dale

19 October 2	NWS Spirit	3–3	Avondale FC	Sydney
16:30 (AEDT)	Konestabo 52'; Kyra 61', 83'	Source	Fornaroli 45+2' (pen.); Trajceski 47'; Abdallah 90+7'	Stadium: Christie Park; Attendance: 779; Referee: Jock Quartermain

24 October 3	Preston Lions	0–0	Avondale FC	Melbourne
19:35 (AEDT)		Source		Stadium: Genis Steel Stadium; Attendance: 5,301; Referee: Eric Saba

26 October 3	NWS Spirit	2–1	Canberra Croatia	Sydney
16:30 (AEDT)	Konestabo 12'; Kyra 66'	Source	Whitehead 3'	Stadium: Christie Park; Attendance: 557; Referee: Jake Rose

1 November 4	Canberra Croatia	1–4	Avondale FC	Canberra
13:00 (AEDT)	Vucetic 86'	Source	Fornaroli 30'; Tavere 33'; Cuba 51', 53'	Stadium: Deakin Stadium; Attendance: 731; Referee: Brodie Merchant

2 November 4	NWS Spirit	1–3	Preston Lions	Sydney
16:30 (AEDT)	Nicholas 90+2'	Source	Romero 18', 33'; Lauton 88'	Stadium: Christie Park; Attendance: 834; Referee: Declan Woods

9 November 5	Preston Lions	0–0	Canberra Croatia	Melbourne
13:00 (AEDT)		Source		Stadium: Genis Steel Stadium; Attendance: 4,111; Referee: Brodie Merchant

9 November 5	Avondale FC	1–0	NWS Spirit	Melbourne
16:30 (AEDT)	Fornaroli 45+1'	Source		Stadium: Avenger Park; Attendance: 545; Referee: Jack Morgan

15 November 6	Avondale FC	1–1	Preston Lions	Melbourne
13:00 (AEDT)	Carpenter 50'	Source	Markovski 65'	Stadium: Avenger Park; Referee: Declan Woods

16 November 6	Canberra Croatia	0–1	NWS Spirit	Canberra
13:30 (AEDT)		Source	Jackson-Brown 25'	Stadium: Deakin Stadium; Referee: Brooklyn Faucett

=== Group D ===
Pos	Team	Pld	W	D	L	GF	GA	GD	Pts	Qualification	APL	MET	BWC	SUD
1	Wests APIA	6	4	1	1	12	4	+8	13	Finals series	—	1–1	4–1	4–0
2	North Eastern MetroStars	6	3	1	2	7	4	+3	10	Finals series	0–1	—	2–0	2–0
3	Bayswater City	6	3	1	2	7	9	−2	10		1–0	1–0	—	3–2
4	Sydney United 58	6	0	1	5	5	14	−9	1		1–2	1–2	1–1	—

Source: Football Australia
Legend: Blue = home team win; Yellow = draw; Red = away team win.

11 October 1	North Eastern MetroStars	0–1	Wests APIA	Adelaide
12:30 (ACDT)		Source	Segreto 58'	Stadium: T.K. Shutter Reserve; Attendance: 1,136; Referee: Tom Brinkworth

12 October 1	Sydney United 58	1–1	Bayswater City	Sydney
16:30 (AEDT)	De Oliveira 71' (pen.)	Source	Stephens 90+4'	Stadium: Sydney United Sports Centre; Attendance: 953; Referee: Jake Rose

17 October 2	Wests APIA	4–0	Sydney United 58	Sydney
19:30 AEDT	Ortiz 28'; Kelly 34'; Symons 45+2'; Costanzo 81' (pen.)	Source		Stadium: Leichhardt Oval; Attendance: 4,263; Referee: Daniel Cook

19 October 2	Bayswater City	1–0	North Eastern MetroStars	Perth
13:30 (AWST)	Davies 54'	Source		Stadium: Frank Drago Reserve; Attendance: 534; Referee: Liam Barclay

25 October 3	Sydney United 58	1–2	North Eastern MetroStars	Sydney
15:15 (AEDT)	Krslovic 7'	Source	Cittadini 50'; Visser 56'	Stadium: Sydney United Sports Centre; Attendance: 318; Referee: Brodie Merchant

26 October 3	Bayswater City	1–0	Wests APIA	Perth
13:30 (AWST)	Loughrey 55'	Source		Stadium: Frank Drago Reserve; Attendance: 697; Referee: Niall Gillmor

2 November 4	Wests APIA	1–1	North Eastern MetroStars	Sydney
13:00 (AEDT)	Kelly 90+3'	Source	Cittadini 36'	Stadium: Leichhardt Oval; Attendance: 2,983; Referee: Eric Saba

2 November 4	Bayswater City	3–2	Sydney United 58	Perth
13:30 (AWST)	Davies 25'; Jackson 30'; Palmateer 58'	Source	Cimenti 60'; Milicevic 65'	Stadium: Frank Drago Reserve; Attendance: 790; Referee: Daniel Cook

7 November 5	Sydney United 58	1–2	Wests APIA	Sydney
19:35 (AEDT)	Krslovic 28'	Source	Kambayashi 24'; Kelly 45'	Stadium: Sydney United Sports Centre; Attendance: 473; Referee: Jack Powers

9 November 5	North Eastern MetroStars	2–0	Bayswater City	Adelaide
16:00 (ACDT)	Walls 52'; Sotira 74'	Source		Stadium: T.K. Shutter Reserve; Attendance: 653; Referee: Declan Woods

16 November 6	North Eastern MetroStars	2–0	Sydney United 58	Adelaide
12:30 (ACDT)	Cittadini 7'; Gow 86'	Source		Stadium: T.K. Shutter Reserve; Referee: Daniel Cook

16 November 6	Wests APIA	4–1	Bayswater City	Sydney
16:30 (AEDT)	Farinella 16', 40'; Gonzalez 87'; Costanzo 90+5'	Source	Edwards 65'	Stadium: Leichhardt Oval; Attendance: 2,467; Referee: Jack Morgan

== Finals series ==
The quarter-finals were played between 21 and 23 November at the home grounds of the group winners; Football Australia selected the venues for the semi-finals and the final, citing the desire to "maximise national reach and deliver the best possible experience for players, fans and broadcast audiences".

Quarter-finals
23 November
South Melbourne	2
NWS Spirit	0
22 November
Heidelberg United	6
North Eastern MetroStars	1
21 November
Wests APIA	1 (7)
Marconi Stallions (p)	1 (8)
22 November
Avondale FC	1
Moreton City Excelsior	3

Semi-finals
29 November
South Melbourne	1
Heidelberg United	0
29 November
Marconi Stallions	1
Moreton City Excelsior	0

Final
6 December
South Melbourne	2
Marconi Stallions	0

=== Quarter-finals ===
21 November
19:45 (AEDT)

Wests APIA	1–1 (a.e.t.)	Marconi Stallions
Gonzalez 90+8'	Report	Busek 71'
Penalties
Symons (penalty missed); Kasalovic (penalty scored); Gonzalez (penalty scored); Kouta (penalty missed); Kelly (penalty scored); Denmead (penalty scored); Ucchino (penalty scored); Kambayashi (penalty scored); Caspers (penalty scored); Kalac (penalty missed)	7–8	(penalty scored) Bayliss; (penalty scored) Daniel; (penalty missed) Swibel; (penalty missed) Van der Saag; (penalty scored) Busek; (penalty scored) Burnie; (penalty scored) Anderson; (penalty scored) Griffiths; (penalty scored) Vella; (penalty scored) Hilton

Leichhardt Oval, Sydney
Attendance: 2,467
Referee: Lachlan Keevers

22 November
12:35 (AEDT)

Avondale FC	1–3	Moreton City Excelsior
Hogan 80'	Report	Kojima 59'; Murai 64', 67'

Avenger Park, Melbourne
Attendance: 565
Referee: Eric Saba

22 November
15:35 (AEDT)

Heidelberg United	6–1	North Eastern MetroStars
McGowan 6'; Juach 7', 56'; Humbert 34', 58'; Lesiotis 86'	Report	Visser 2'

Olympic Park, Melbourne
Attendance: 604
Referee: Declan Woods

23 November
15:05 (AEDT)

South Melbourne	2–0	NWS Spirit
Lavale 34'; Mikkola 71'	Report

Lakeside Stadium, Melbourne
Attendance: 1,898
Referee: Jack Morgan

=== Semi-finals ===
29 November
12:35 (AEDT)

Marconi Stallions	1–0	Moreton City Excelsior
Busek 80'	Report

Marconi Stadium, Sydney
Attendance: 1,477
Referee: Declan Woods

29 November
15:35 (AEDT)

South Melbourne	1–0	Heidelberg United
Aguek 72'	Report

Lakeside Stadium, Melbourne
Attendance: 4,048
Referee: Tim Danaskos

=== Final ===
6 December
15:00 AEDT

South Melbourne	2–0	Marconi Stallions
Aguek 11'; Janković 20'	Report

Olympic Park, Melbourne
Attendance: 4,667
Referee: Eric Saba

== Top goalscorers ==
Rank	Player	Club	Goals
1	(Australia) Ali Auglah	Sydney Olympic	6
2	(South Sudan) Manyluak Aguek	South Melbourne	5
2	(Japan) Seita Murai	Moreton City Excelsior	5
2	(Australia) Lachlan Scott	Wollongong Wolves	5
5	(Australia) Bruno Fornaroli	Avondale FC	4
5	(Australia) Marcus Humbert	Heidelberg United	4
5	(Australia) Bul Juach	Heidelberg United	4
5	(Australia) Joseph Scott	Moreton City Excelsior	4
9	(Australia) Jarred Baker	Broadmeadow Magic	3
9	(Australia) Michael Cittadini	North Eastern MetroStars	3
9	(New Zealand) Ryan Feutz	Sydney Olympic	3
9	(Canada) Dredon Kelly	Wests APIA	3
9	(Japan) Keitatsu Kojima	Moreton City Excelsior	3
9	(Australia) Aedon Kyra	NWS Spirit	3
9	(Australia) Jordon Lampard	South Melbourne	3
9	(Australia) Oliver Lavale	South Melbourne	3
9	(United States) Jason Romero	Preston Lions	3
9	(Australia) Damian Tsekenis	Marconi Stallions	3

== See also ==
- 2025–26 A-League Men
- 2025 National Premier Leagues
