= 2023 National Premier Leagues NSW Men's =

67th season of the NSW Premier League

NPL NSW Men's
- Season: 2023
- Dates: 3 February 2023 – 27 August 2023
- Champions: APIA Leichhardt
- Matches: 96
- Goals: 304 (3.17 per match)
- Top goalscorer: Alec Urosevski (27 goals)
- Biggest home win: APIA Leichhardt 6–0 Rockdale Ilinden (12 February 2023)
- Biggest away win: Wollongong Wolves 0–4 Marconi (17 February 2023); Western Sydney Wanderers 0–4 Marconi (1 April 2023)
- Highest scoring: NWS Spirit 5–4 Wollongong Wolves (1 April 2023); Marconi Stallions 5–4 Central Coast Mariners (27 August 2023)
- Longest winning run: 8 matches Rockdale Ilinden
- Longest unbeaten run: 12 matches APIA Leichhardt
- Longest winless run: 10 matches Northbridge Bulls
- Longest losing run: 4 matches Western Sydney Wanderers; Sydney Olympic; Central Coast Mariners
- All statistics correct as of 5 May 2023.

The 2023 NPL NSW Men's is the eleventh season of soccer in New South Wales under the banner of the National Premier Leagues and the first season under the revised competition format. The season began on 3 February 2023 and is scheduled to conclude on 27 August.

Sydney Olympic are the defending premiers and Blacktown City are the defending champions.

== Promotion and relegation ==
Teams promoted from the 2022 NSW League One

- Central Coast Mariners Academy
- St George City
- Western Sydney Wanderers Youth
- NWS Spirit FC

=== Stadiums and locations ===
Team	Head coach	Location	Stadium	Capacity
APIA Leichhardt	(Australia) Franco Parisi	Leichhardt	Lambert Park	7,000
Blacktown City	(Australia) Mark Crittenden	Blacktown	Blacktown City Sports Centre	7,500
Bulls FC Academy	(Australia) Zeljko Kalac	Northbridge	Sydney United Sports Centre	12,000
Central Coast Mariners Academy	(Australia) Abbas Saad	Gosford	Pluim Park	2,000
Mt Druitt Rangers	(Australia) Stewart Montgomery	Mount Druitt	Popondetta Park	2,500
Marconi Stallions	(Australia) Peter Tsekenis	Fairfield	Marconi Stadium	9,000
Manly United	(Netherlands) Patrick Zwaanswijk	Dee Why	Cromer Park	5,000
NWS Spirit FC	(Australia) David Perkovic	North Sydney	Christie Park	1,000
Rockdale Ilinden	(Australia) Paul Dee	Rockdale	Rockdale Ilinden Sports Centre	5,000
Sydney FC Youth	(Australia) Jimmy Van Weeren	Moore Park	Valentine Sports Park	4,000
Sydney Olympic	(Australia) Labinot Haliti	Belmore	Belmore Sports Ground	20,000
Sutherland Sharks	(Australia) Damir Prodanovic	Sutherland	Seymour Shaw Park	5,000
St George City	(Australia) Mirko Jurilj	St George	Peakhurst Park	1,000
Sydney United	(Australia) Miro Vlastelica	Edensor Park	Sydney United Sports Centre	12,000
Western Sydney Wanderers Youth	(Australia) Andrew Christiansen	Blacktown	Wanderers Football Park	4,500
Wollongong Wolves	(Australia) David Carney	Wollongong	WIN Stadium	22,000

=== Managerial changes ===
Team	Outgoing manager	Manner of departure	Date of vacancy	Position in table	Incoming manager	Date of appointment
Bulls FC Academy	(Australia) Mile Sterjovski	Promoted to full time	23 January 2023	Pre-season	(Australia) Zeljko Kalac	28 January 2023
CCM Academy	(Australia) Luke Wilkshire	Signed by Socceroos	14 February 2023	12th	(Australia) Lucas Vilela (interim)	17 February 2023
CCM Academy	(Australia) Lucas Vilela (interim)	End of caretaker spell	24 February 2023	13th	(Australia) Abbas Saad	25 February 2023

== Foreign players ==
Team	Visa 1	Visa 2	Non-visa foreigner(s)	Former players
APIA Leichhardt	(France) Florent Indalecio	(United States) Jason Romero		(Argentina) Diego Celis
Blacktown City	(France) Charles Mendy	(Japan) Tatsuya Kato	(South Korea) Danny Choi^{1}	(Malta) Mitchell Mallia^{2}
Bulls FC Academy				
CCM Academy			(New Zealand) Zac Zoricich^{2}	
Mt Druitt Rangers	(Cape Verde) Júnior Sena	(Japan) Kotaro Katsuta		
Marconi Stallions	(Japan) Hiroaki Aoyama			
Manly United	(Japan) Seiya Kambayashi	(Brazil) Bruno Mendes	(Fiji) Marcus Lal^{2}	
NWS Spirit FC	(Japan) Kôta Odakura	(Brazil) Luiz Lobo	(Japan) Musashi Kokubo^{2}	
Rockdale Ilinden	(Argentina) Diego Celis	(France) Loïc Puyo	(North Macedonia) Nicola Kuleski^{2} (Philippines) Iain Ramsay^{2}	
Sydney FC Youth				
Sydney Olympic	(Scotland) Ziggy Gordon	(Portugal) Fábio Ferreira	(Republic of Ireland) Roy O'Donovan^{1}	
Sutherland Sharks	(Japan) Takahide Umebachi		(Japan) Fumoto Kamada^{2}	
St George City	(Brazil) Pedro Ferrari	(Uruguay) Franco Maya		
Sydney United	(Japan) Taisei Kaneko		(Fiji) Leroy Jennings^{2}	
Western Sydney Wanderers Youth				
Wollongong Wolves	(Japan) Banri Kanaizumi	(Japan) Takumi Ofuka	(Scotland) Chris McStay^{1}	

The following do not fill a Visa position:
^{1}Those players who were born and started their professional career abroad but have since gained Australian citizenship
^{2}Australian citizens who have chosen to represent another national team;

== Regular season ==
The 2023 season is a double round-robin format, with each team playing 30 games. The season started on 3 February, and is scheduled to conclude on 27 August.

=== Table ===
Pos	Team	Pld	W	D	L	GF	GA	GD	Pts	Qualification or relegation
1	APIA Leichhardt (C)	30	20	5	5	64	35	+29	65	
2	Rockdale Ilinden	30	18	5	7	60	45	+15	59	
3	Blacktown City	30	17	6	7	59	33	+26	57	
4	Marconi Stallions	30	17	5	8	64	35	+29	56	
5	St George City	30	14	9	7	62	40	+22	51	
6	Sydney FC Youth	30	14	4	12	49	52	−3	46	
7	Wollongong Wolves	30	11	10	9	57	43	+14	43	
8	Manly United	30	12	6	12	41	43	−2	42	
9	Sydney Olympic	30	10	9	11	51	53	−2	39	
10	Sydney United	30	11	6	13	42	48	−6	39	
11	NWS Spirit	30	11	6	13	40	53	−13	39	
12	Central Coast Mariners Academy	30	9	6	15	42	57	−15	33	
13	Western Sydney Wanderers Youth	30	8	7	15	52	61	−9	31	
14	Sutherland Sharks	30	8	7	15	21	35	−14	31	
15	Mt Druitt Town Rangers (R)	30	6	5	19	31	61	−30	23	Qualification to Relegation play-off
16	Bulls FC Academy (R)	30	3	6	21	24	65	−41	15	Relegation to 2024 NSW League One

Source: Ladder
Rules for classification: 1) Points; 2) Goal difference; 3) Number of goals scored; 4) Points gained in head-to-head record between teams; 5) Number of goals scored in head-to-head record between teams; 6) Play-off if teams concerned are equal on the basis of the above criteria
(C) Champions; (R) Relegated

=== Fixtures and results ===
Home \ Away	APT	BCT	BUL	CCM	MAN	MAR	MTR	NWS	ROC	SOL	STC	SUD	SUT	SYD	WSW	WOL
APIA Leichhardt	—		2–2	1–0	3–1	0–0	2–0	5–0	6–0	3–0		1–2	1–0		2–1	3–0
Blacktown City	2–4	—	4–1	4–1		3–1	4–1	1–2	1–2	5–1			2–0	3–0	0–0	
Bull FC	1–2		—	1–1		1–4	1–3	1–2	2–1	1–3	0–0	0–1	1–2	1–1		1–1
CCM Academy	1–2	0–1	4–2	—		2–0	1–4	4–2		2–2		2–1	2–2	2–1	1–3	2–2
Manly United		0–2	3–2	2–0	—	1–1	2–0	0–2	2–2	1–3	2–0	2–1		2–1		0–3
Marconi Stallions	1–1	2–0			3–1	—			3–1		2–3	2–1	0–2	5–0	3–3	1–0
Mt Druitt Town Rangers	1–2	0–2	2–1	1–2	1–2		—	0–0	0–3	1–1	0–3	1–0	1–2	1–2	2–1	
NWS Spirit		3–2	2–0	0–1	1–3	0–2	3–1	—	0–1	0–0	2–2		2–2	1–0	1–0	5–4
Rockdale Ilinden	1–2				2–0		1–0		—	3–1	2–2	3–1	2–0	4–2	5–1	0–4
Sydney Olympic		1–3	1–0	1–3	2–2	2–4		1–1	0–2	—	0–0		3–0	1–2	3–1	2–2
St George City	1–2	2–2	4–1	1–1	1–1	0–2		3–0	3–4	1–0	—	0–1		3–4	4–2	5–3
Sydney United	1–3	1–0	0–0		2–0	3–1		2–2	3–3	0–1		—	2–1	0–1	3–6	
Sutherland Sharks	0–1	0–1		0–0	1–0	0–0		1–0	0–1	1–0	0–2	0–0	—	0–0		0–3
Sydney FC Youth	4–0	1–0	4–1	3–1	2–1	1–2	4–2			2–3	2–2	1–0		—	0–1	2–1
WSW Youth	2–2	2–3	0–1	1–2	2–1	0–4			3–3	3–2	1–2	3–4	0–1		—	2–2
Wollongong Wolves	2–2	0–0	2–0			0–4	0–0	2–1	1–3		1–2	0–0	2–0			—

Updated to match(es) played on 3 February 2023. Source: footballnsw.com.au
Legend: Blue = home team win; Yellow = draw; Red = away team win.
For upcoming matches, an "a" indicates there is an article about the rivalry between the two participants.

=== Festival of Football ===
The third edition of the Festival of Football was played on 23 April, featuring Inner West rivals and former NSL clubs APIA Leichhardt and Sydney Olympic with their playing against each other. This featured youth, women's and men's matches. Additionally, a legends match was also included, which featured former players such as Ernie Campbell, Marshall Soper, Jean-Paul de Marigny, Milan Blagojevic, John Buonavoglia, Nick Rizzo, Mark Byrnes, Robert Younis, Peter Katholos, Pablo Cardozo, Robbie Hooker, Zlatko Nastevski and Paul Henderson.

The feature match was the Men's NPL match, part of Round 12 of the National Premier Leagues NSW. Coming into the match APIA had won all eleven previous league matches.

23 April 2023
18:00 AEST

APIA Leichhardt	3–0	Sydney Olympic
Armson 58'; S.Symons 72', 84'	Report

Lambert Park, Leichhardt
Attendance: 4,123
Referee: Craig Fisher

== Relegation play-offs ==
All times are AEST (UTC+10).

=== First leg ===
3 September 2023
15:00

St George FC	1–1	Mt Druitt Town
Jones 23'	Report	Djordjevic 34'

Rockdale Ilinden Sports Centre, Rockdale

=== Second leg ===
9 September 2023
14:30

Mt Druitt Town	0–1	St George FC
	Report	Spang 8'

Popondetta Park, Emerton

St George FC won 2–1 on aggregate. Therefore, St George are promoted to the NSW NPL, while Mt Druitt Town are relegated to the FNSW League One.

== Regular season statistics ==
=== Top scorers ===
Rank	Player	Club	Goals
1	(Australia) Alec Urosevski	Rockdale Ilinden	27
2	(Republic of Ireland) Roy O'Donovan	Sydney Olympic	18
3	(Australia) Jak O'Brien	Blacktown City	17
4	(Australia) Jordan Swibel	Marconi Stallions	15
5	(Australia) Jack Armson	APIA Leichhardt	14
5	(Australia) Jack Stewart	APIA Leichhardt	14
5	(Australia) Patrick Antelmi	Sydney United	14
8	(Australia) Lachlan Scott	Wollongong Wolves	13
9	(Australia) Christopher Payne	Sydney United	11
9	(Australia) Presley Ortiz	St George City	11
9	(Australia) Travis Major	Blacktown City	11

=== Hat-tricks ===
Player	For	Against	Result	Date	Ref.
(United States) Jason Romero^{4}	APIA Leichhardt FC	Rockdale Ilinden FC	6–0 (H)	12 February 2023	
(Australia) Jak O'Brien	Blacktown City FC	Mt Druitt Town Rangers FC	4–1 (H)	5 March 2023	
(Australia) Sean Symons	APIA Leichhardt FC	NWS Spirit FC	5–0 (H)	6 May 2023	
(Australia) Harry McCarthy	Manly United FC	APIA Leichhardt FC	4–0 (H)	22 July 2023	

Notes

- ^{4} Player scored 4 goals
- (H) – Home team
- (A) – Away team

== See also ==
- 2023 National Premier Leagues
