= 2020–21 Perth Glory FC season =

Perth Glory
2020–21 season
- Chairman: Tony Sage
- Manager: Richard Garcia
- Stadium: HBF Park, Perth
- A-League: 9th
- FFA Cup: Cancelled
- Top goalscorer: League: Bruno Fornaroli (13 goals); All: Bruno Fornaroli (14 goals)
- Highest home attendance: 9,229 vs Wellington Phoenix (18 April 2021)
- Lowest home attendance: 2,719 vs Western United (12 May 2021)
- Average home league attendance: 4,777
Home colours	Away colours

The 2020–21 Perth Glory FC season was the club's 24th season since its establishment in 1996. The club participated in the A-League for the 16th time. The club did not compete in the 2020 FFA Cup due to the event being cancelled following the COVID-19 pandemic in Australia.

== Players ==
Current squad: Note: Flags indicate national team as defined under FIFA eligibility rules; some limited exceptions apply. Players may hold more than one non-FIFA nationality.

No.	Pos.	Nation	Player
1	GK	AUS	Tando Velaphi
2	DF	AUS	Jason Geria
4	DF	GER	Sebastian Langkamp
5	DF	AUS	Jonathan Aspropotamitis
6	DF	AUS	Osama Malik
7	MF	AUS	Chris Ikonomidis
8	DF	JPN	Kosuke Ota
9	FW	URU	Bruno Fornaroli
10	FW	IRL	Andy Keogh
11	FW	AUS	Joel Chianese (on loan from Hyderabad)
12	GK	AUS	Cameron Cook (scholarship)
13	DF	AUS	Luke Bodnar
15	MF	AUS	Brandon Wilson
16	MF	AUS	Nick Sullivan
17	MF	ESP	Diego Castro (captain)
18	FW	AUS	Nicholas D'Agostino

No.	Pos.	Nation	Player
19	MF	AUS	Callum Timmins
20	FW	AUS	Carlo Armiento
21	MF	AUS	Bryce Bafford
22	DF	AUS	Joshua Rawlins
23	DF	NZL	Dane Ingham
24	MF	AUS	Daniel Stynes
25	DF	AUS	Nicholas Walsh
26	MF	AUS	Giordano Colli
28	FW	AUS	Trent Ostler
29	DF	CUW	Darryl Lachman
31	DF	AUS	Daniel Walsh
33	GK	AUS	Liam Reddy
34	DF	AUS	Mason Tatafu
38	FW	AUS	Ciaran Bramwell
88	MF	AUS	Neil Kilkenny (vice-captain)

== Transfers ==
=== Transfers in ===
No.	Position	Player	Transferred from	Type/fee	Contract length	Date	Ref
	DF	Nathaniel Atkinson	Melbourne City	Free transfer	2 years	1 September 2020	
	FW	Andrew Nabbout	Melbourne Victory	Free transfer	2 years	1 September 2020	
10	FW	(Republic of Ireland) Andy Keogh	Unattached	Free transfer	2 years	19 October 2020	
15	MF	Brandon Wilson	Wellington Phoenix	Free transfer	1 year	19 October 2020	
5	DF	Jonathan Aspropotamitis	Western United	Free transfer	3 months	21 October 2020	
16	MF	Nick Sullivan	Unattached	Free transfer	1 year	21 October 2020	
29	DF	(Curaçao) Darryl Lachman	(Israel) Hapoel Ra'anana	Free transfer	2 years	23 October 2020	
1	GK	Tando Velaphi	Unattached	Free transfer	1 year	10 November 2020	
13	DF	Luke Bodnar	(Australia) ECU Joondalup	Free transfer		11 November 2020	
24	MF	Daniel Stynes	(Australia) Gwelup Croatia	Free transfer		11 November 2020	
8	DF	(Japan) Kosuke Ota	(Japan) Nagoya Grampus	Undisclosed	1 year	11 December 2020	
4	DF	(Germany) Sebastian Langkamp	Unattached	Free transfer	2 years	8 January 2021	
19	MF	Callum Timmins	(Australia) Balcatta	Free transfer		8 January 2021	
2	DF	Jason Geria	Unattached	Free transfer	3 months	22 March 2021	
11	FW	Joel Chianese	(India) Hyderabad	Loan	4 months	12 April 2021	

==== From youth squad ====
N	Pos.	Nat.	Name	Age	Notes
21	MF	(Australia)	Bryce Bafford	19	
22	DF	(Australia)	Joshua Rawlins	16	
25	DF	(Australia)	Nicholas Walsh	18	
26	MF	(Australia)	Giordano Colli	20	
34	DF	(Australia)	Mason Tatafu	18	
28	FW	(Australia)	Trent Ostler	18	
31	DF	(Australia)	Daniel Walsh	18	
38	DF	(Australia)	Ciaran Bramwell	19	

=== Transfers out ===
No.	Position	Player	Transferred to	Type/fee	Date	Ref
7	FW	Joel Chianese	(India) Hyderabad	End of contract	22 August 2020	
61	MF	Yianni Perkatis	(Australia) Sydney United	End of contract	31 August 2020	
6	DF	Dino Djulbic	Unattached	End of contract	1 September 2020	
22	MF	Vince Lia	Unattached	End of contract	1 September 2020	
1	GK	Tando Velaphi	Unattached	End of contract	1 September 2020	
5	DF	Ivan Franjic	Macarthur FC	End of contract	1 September 2020	
27	MF	(Spain) Juande	Unattached	End of contract	9 September 2020	
3	DF	Jacob Tratt	(India) Odisha	End of contract	12 September 2020	
16	DF	Tomislav Mrcela	Unattached	End of contract	23 September 2020	
	DF	Nathaniel Atkinson	Melbourne City	Mutual contract termination	23 September 2020	
	FW	Andrew Nabbout	Melbourne City	Mutual contract termination	23 September 2020	
20	MF	Jake Brimmer	Unattached	Mutual contract termination	6 October 2020	
29	MF	Kristian Popovic	(Greece) Xanthi	End of contract	15 October 2020	
28	FW	Gabriel Popovic	(Greece) Xanthi	End of contract	29 October 2020	
50	GK	Daniel Margush	Unattached	Mutual contract termination	10 November 2020	
21	DF	Tarek Elrich	Unattached	Mutual contract termination	8 December 2020	
8	DF	James Meredith	Macarthur FC	End of contract	9 December 2020	
2	DF	Alex Grant	(South Korea) Pohang Steelers	Undisclosed	11 December 2020	

=== Contract extensions ===
No.	Name	Position	Duration	Date	Notes
5	Jonathan Aspropotamitis	Centre-back	1 year	11 January 2021	

== Pre-season and friendlies ==
8 January 2021	Perth SC (Australia)	1–1	(Australia) Perth Glory	Perth
19:30 AWST	Sabatini 31'	Report	Fornaroli 34'	Stadium: Dorrien Gardens; Referee: Adam Fielding

== Competitions ==
Win Draw Loss

=== Overview ===
Competition	First match	Last match	Starting round	Final position	Record							
Competition	First match	Last match	Starting round	Final position	Pld	W	D	L	GF	GA	GD	Win %
A-League	20 January 2021	5 June 2021	Matchday 1	9th	26	9	7	10	44	44	+0	34.62
AFC Champions League	18 November 2020	3 December 2020	Group stage	Group stage	5	0	1	4	5	10	−5	0.00
Total					31	9	8	14	49	54	−5	29.03

Source: Soccerway

=== A-League ===
==== League table ====
Pos	Team	Pld	W	D	L	GF	GA	GD	Pts	Qualification
7	Wellington Phoenix (Note: Wellington Phoenix cannot qualify for Asian Football Confederation competitions as they are based in New Zealand, which is under the Oceania Football Confederation.)	26	10	8	8	44	34	+10	38	
8	Western Sydney Wanderers	26	9	8	9	45	43	+2	35	
9	Perth Glory	26	9	7	10	44	44	0	34	Qualification for 2021 FFA Cup play-offs (Note: The top 8 teams qualified for the round of 32, while the bottom four teams participated in a playoff round.)
10	Western United	26	8	4	14	30	47	−17	28	Qualification for 2021 FFA Cup play-offs
11	Newcastle Jets	26	5	6	15	24	38	−14	21	Qualification for 2021 FFA Cup play-offs

Source: A-Leagues
Rules for classification: 1) Points; 2) Goal difference; 3) Goals scored; 4) Least red cards; 5) Least yellow cards; 6) Toss of a coin in an event of a tie of two clubs.

==== Results summary ====
Overall								Home						Away					
Pld	W	D	L	GF	GA	GD	Pts	W	D	L	GF	GA	GD	W	D	L	GF	GA	GD
26	9	7	10	44	44	0	34	7	3	3	27	18	+9	2	4	7	17	26	−9

Last updated: 5 June 2021.
Source: ultimatealeague.com

==== Result by round ====
Round	1	2	3	4	5		6	7	8	9	10		11	12	13		14	15		16	17	18	19		20		21		22	23		24
Ground	B	B	B	H	A	A	A	A	B	B	H	H	A	A	A	H	H	A	A	A	H	B	H	H	H	H	H	H	H	A	A	A
Result	✖	✖	✖	W	L	L	W	W	✖	✖	W	L	L	D	L	D	W	L	L	D	L	✖	D	L	W	W	W	W	D	D	L	D
Position	6	8	10	8	9		7	6	6	8	6		8	9	10		7	9		10	10	10	10		10		8		8	9		9

Updated to match(es) played on 5 June 2021. Source: ultimatealeague.com
H = Home; A = Away; B = Bye; W = Win; D = Draw; L = Lose

==== Matches ====
20 January 2021 4	Perth Glory	5–3	Adelaide United	Perth
18:20 AWST	Kilkenny 10' (pen.); D'Agostino 34', 60'; Fornaroli 51'; Armiento 84'	Report	Konstandopoulos 42'; M. Toure 88'; Halloran 90+3'	Stadium: HBF Park; Attendance: 6,125; Referee: Adam Fielding

23 January 2021 5	Western United	5–4	Perth Glory	Geelong
17:05 AEDT	Sánchez 10'; Pierias 60', 64'; Imai 75'; Lustica 84'	Report	Armiento 56', 78'; Fornaroli 58'; D'Agostino 69'	Stadium: GMHBA Stadium; Attendance: 3,631; Referee: Jonathan Barreiro

26 January 2021 5	Melbourne Victory	2–1	Perth Glory	Melbourne
19:05 AEDT	Brimmer 86', 90' (pen.)	Report	Fornaroli 62'	Stadium: AAMI Park; Attendance: 7,018; Referee: Shaun Evans

31 January 2021 6	Melbourne City	1–3	Perth Glory	Melbourne
18:40 AEDT	Maclaren 33'	Report	Stynes 11'; Ingham 42'; D'Agostino 84'	Stadium: AAMI Park; Attendance: 5,685; Referee: Chris Beath

5 February 2021 7	Adelaide United	1–2	Perth Glory	Adelaide
18:35 ACST	Mauk 20'	Report	Fornaroli 73'; Timotheou 83' (o.g.)	Stadium: Coopers Stadium; Attendance: 5,728; Referee: Adam Kersey

26 February 2021 10	Perth Glory	3–1	Brisbane Roar	Perth
18:05 AWST	Castro 40', 75'; Fornaroli 68'	Report	Hingert 45+4'	Stadium: HBF Park; Attendance: 5,432; Referee: Alireza Fagahani

2 March 2021 10	Perth Glory	1–2	Central Coast Mariners	Perth
18:20 AWST	Fornaroli 65'	Report	Simon 6'; Ureña 40'	Stadium: HBF Park; Attendance: 4,125; Referee: Daniel Elder

7 March 2021 11	Wellington Phoenix	3–0	Perth Glory	Wollongong
16:00 AEDT	Piscopo 30'; Ball 35'; Waine 59'	Report		Stadium: WIN Stadium; Attendance: 2,331; Referee: Adam Kersey

14 March 2021 12	Central Coast Mariners	2–2	Perth Glory	Gosford
16:05 AEDT	Ureña 25'; Simon 90' (pen.)	Report	Fornaroli 41'; D'Agostino 76'	Stadium: Central Coast Stadium; Attendance: 3,573; Referee: Kurt Ams

19 March 2021 13	Western Sydney Wanderers	3–0	Perth Glory	Sydney
19:05 AEDT	Duke 45', 47'; Troisi 52'	Report		Stadium: Bankwest Stadium; Attendance: 6,012; Referee: Daniel Elder

24 March 2021 13	Perth Glory	1–1	Sydney FC	Perth
18:20 AWST	Fornaroli 43'	Report	Bobô 63'	Stadium: HBF Park; Attendance: 4,237; Referee: Alireza Faghani

27 March 2021 14	Perth Glory	2–1	Newcastle Jets	Perth
19:20 AWST	Bramwell 17'; Lachman 24'	Report	O'Donovan 59'	Stadium: HBF Park; Attendance: 5,715; Referee: Daniel Elder

2 April 2021 15	Macarthur FC	2–0	Perth Glory	Campbelltown
15:05 AEDT	Derbyshire 10', 45' (pen.)	Report		Stadium: Campbelltown Stadium; Attendance: 3,724; Referee: Kurt Ams

7 April 2021 15	Sydney FC	1–0	Perth Glory	Sydney
17:05 AEDT	Barbarouses 54'	Report		Stadium: Jubilee Oval; Attendance: 5,122; Referee: Adam Kersey

13 April 2021 16	Newcastle Jets	1–1	Perth Glory	Coffs Harbour
17:05 AEDT	O'Donovan 67' (pen.)	Report	Chianese 61'	Stadium: C.ex Coffs International Stadium; Attendance: 2,967; Referee: Shaun Evans

18 April 2021 17	Perth Glory	1–3	Wellington Phoenix	Perth
18:15 AWST	Chianese 58'	Report	Waine 56'; Fenton 66'; Sotirio 75'	Stadium: HBF Park; Attendance: 9,229; Referee: Daniel Elder

1 May 2021 19	Perth Glory	0–0	Macarthur FC	Perth
13:05 AWST		Report		Stadium: HBF Park; Attendance: 3,253; Referee: Ben Abraham

5 May 2021 19	Perth Glory	1–3	Melbourne City	Perth
21:20 AWST	Ikonomidis 31'	Report	Bodnar 36' (o.g.); Maclaren 45+1', 68'	Stadium: HBF Park; Attendance: 0 (No spectators permitted); Referee: Adam Fielding

9 May 2021 20	Perth Glory	2–1	Melbourne Victory	Perth
18:10 AWST	Fornaroli 52'; Ikonomidis 56'	Report	Gestede 79'	Stadium: HBF Park; Attendance: 3,134; Referee: Kurt Ams

12 May 2021 20	Perth Glory	3–0	Western United	Perth
21:20 AWST	Fornaroli 10'; Ikonomidis 22'; Chianese 77'	Report		Stadium: HBF Park; Attendance: 2,719; Referee: Alireza Faghani

16 May 2021 21	Perth Glory	5–1	Western Sydney Wanderers	Perth
20:15 AWST	Keogh 5', 24', 66' (pen.), 72'; Chianese 90+4'	Report	Kamau 49'	Stadium: HBF Park; Attendance: 4,510; Referee: Daniel Elder

19 May 2021 21	Perth Glory	2–1	Adelaide United	Perth
21:20 AWST	Fornaroli 78'; Ikonomidis 86'	Report	Yengi 28'	Stadium: HBF Park; Attendance: 3,523; Referee: Shaun Evans

23 May 2021 22	Perth Glory	1–1	Macarthur FC	Perth
20:15 AWST	Castro 13' (pen.)	Report	Derbyshire 30'	Stadium: HBF Park; Attendance: 5,282; Referee: Ben Abraham

30 May 2021 23	Wellington Phoenix	2–2	Perth Glory	Auckland
13:35 NZDT	Hemed 24'; Sotirio 80'	Report	Fornaroli 61'; Timmins 75'	Stadium: Eden Park; Attendance: 22,233; Referee: Alex King

2 June 2021 23	Brisbane Roar	2–1	Perth Glory	Kippa-Ring
19:05 AEST	Aspropotamitis 51' (o.g.); Danzaki 73'	Report	Wilson 85'	Stadium: Dolphin Stadium; Attendance: 3,879; Referee: Chris Beath

5 June 2021 24	Newcastle Jets	1–1	Perth Glory	Newcastle
19:10 AEST	Aspropotamitis 70' (o.g.)	Report	Fornaroli 21'	Stadium: McDonald Jones Stadium; Attendance: 4,065; Referee: Adam Fielding

=== AFC Champions League ===
Perth Glory were in continuation of their 2020 AFC Champions League campaign from their 2019–20 season.

==== Group stage ====
Pos	Team	Pld	W	D	L	GF	GA	GD	Pts	Qualification
1	(South Korea) Ulsan Hyundai	6	5	1	0	14	5	+9	16	Advance to knockout stage
2	(Japan) FC Tokyo	6	3	1	2	6	5	+1	10	Advance to knockout stage
3	(China) Shanghai Shenhua	6	2	1	3	9	13	−4	7	
4	(Australia) Perth Glory	6	0	1	5	5	11	−6	1	

Source: AFC
Rules for classification: Tiebreakers

18 November 2020	Perth Glory (Australia)	1–2	(China) Shanghai Shenhua	Doha, Qatar
13:00 UTC+3	Aspropotamitis 81'	Report	Peng 7'; Yu 38'	Stadium: Education City Stadium; Attendance: 0 Referee: Mohammed Abdulla Hassan Mohamed (United Arab Emirates)

24 November 2020	Perth Glory (Australia)	1–2	(South Korea) Ulsan Hyundai	Doha, Qatar
16:00 UTC+3	Stynes 71'	Report	I.S. Kim 89'; Negrão 90+3'	Stadium: Education City Stadium; Attendance: 0 Referee: Nazmi Nasaruddin (Malaysia)

27 November 2020	Ulsan Hyundai (South Korea)	2–0	(Australia) Perth Glory	Doha, Qatar
13:00 UTC+3	I.S. Kim 87'; Negrão 89'	Report		Stadium: Education City Stadium; Attendance: 0 Referee: Sivakorn Pu-udom (Thailand)

30 November 2020	Shanghai Shenhua (China)	3–3	(Australia) Perth Glory	Doha, Qatar
16:00 UTC+3	Moreno 62', 72'; Yu 73'	Report	Fornaroli 45+2'; Armiento 58'; Kilkenny 86' (pen.)	Stadium: Education City Stadium; Attendance: 0 Referee: Hettikamkanamge Perera (Sri Lanka)

3 December 2020	Perth Glory (Australia)	0–1	(Japan) FC Tokyo	Doha, Qatar
13:00 UTC+3		Report	Adaílton 8'	Stadium: Education City Stadium; Attendance: 0 Referee: Hanna Hattab (Syria)

== Statistics ==
=== Appearances and goals ===
Includes all competitions. Players with no appearances not included in the list.

No.	Pos	Nat	Player	Total		A-League		AFC Champions League	
No.	Pos	Nat	Player	Apps	Goals	Apps	Goals	Apps	Goals
1	GK	(Australia) AUS	Tando Velaphi	10	0	7	0	3	0
2	DF	(Australia) AUS	Jason Geria	13	0	13	0	0	0
4	DF	(Germany) GER	Sebastian Langkamp	2	0	2	0	0	0
5	DF	(Australia) AUS	Jonathan Aspropotamitis	22	1	17+1	0	4	1
6	MF	(Australia) AUS	Osama Malik	17	0	8+6	0	2+1	0
7	FW	(Australia) AUS	Chris Ikonomidis	9	4	8+1	4	0	0
8	DF	(Japan) JPN	Kosuke Ota	19	0	17+2	0	0	0
9	FW	(Uruguay) URU	Bruno Fornaroli	31	14	25+1	13	3+2	1
10	FW	(Republic of Ireland) IRL	Andy Keogh	23	4	16+7	4	0	0
11	FW	(Australia) AUS	Joel Chianese	12	4	4+8	4	0	0
13	DF	(Australia) AUS	Luke Bodnar	19	0	11+3	0	3+2	0
14	MF	(Australia) AUS	Giordano Colli	3	0	0	0	2+1	0
15	MF	(Australia) AUS	Brandon Wilson	21	1	8+9	1	2+2	0
16	MF	(Australia) AUS	Nick Sullivan	14	0	4+6	0	1+3	0
17	MF	(Spain) ESP	Diego Castro	25	3	16+5	3	3+1	0
18	FW	(Australia) AUS	Nicholas D'Agostino	17	5	7+9	5	1	0
19	MF	(Australia) AUS	Callum Timmins	19	1	14+5	1	0	0
20	FW	(Australia) AUS	Carlo Armiento	27	4	9+13	3	2+3	1
21	FW	(Australia) AUS	Bryce Bafford	7	0	0+3	0	4	0
22	DF	(Australia) AUS	Joshua Rawlins	16	0	8+4	0	3+1	0
23	DF	(New Zealand) NZL	Dane Ingham	26	1	14+7	1	4+1	0
24	MF	(Australia) AUS	Daniel Stynes	20	3	9+7	2	3+1	1
25	DF	(Australia) AUS	Nicholas Walsh	4	0	0	0	3+1	0
29	DF	(Curaçao) CUW	Darryl Lachman	28	1	23+2	1	2+1	0
33	GK	(Australia) AUS	Liam Reddy	21	0	19	0	2	0
34	DF	(Australia) AUS	Mason Tatafu	5	0	1+2	0	2	0
37	DF	(Australia) AUS	Riley Warland	5	0	2+3	0	0	0
38	FW	(Australia) AUS	Ciaran Bramwell	12	1	7+5	1	0	0
88	MF	(Australia) AUS	Neil Kilkenny	22	2	17+1	1	3+1	1
	MF	(England) ENG	Declan Hughes	4	0	0	0	3+1	0

- Source: Soccerway

=== Disciplinary record ===
Includes all competitions. The list is sorted by squad number when total cards are equal. Players with no cards not included in the list.

No.	Pos	Nat	Player	Total			A-League			AFC Champions League		
No.	Pos	Nat	Player	Yellow card	Second yellow card	Red card	Yellow card	Second yellow card	Red card	Yellow card	Second yellow card	Red card
5	DF	(Australia) AUS	Jonathan Aspropotamitis	7	1	0	6	1	0	1	0	0
9	FW	(Uruguay) URU	Bruno Fornaroli	7	0	0	6	0	0	1	0	0
16	MF	(Australia) AUS	Nick Sullivan	6	0	0	4	0	0	2	0	0
19	MF	(Australia) AUS	Callum Timmins	5	0	0	5	0	0	0	0	0
88	MF	(Australia) AUS	Neil Kilkenny	5	0	0	3	0	0	2	0	0
17	MF	(Spain) ESP	Diego Castro	4	0	0	3	0	0	1	0	0
20	FW	(Australia) AUS	Carlo Armiento	4	0	0	4	0	0	0	0	0
23	DF	(New Zealand) NZL	Dane Ingham	4	0	0	4	0	0	0	0	0
10	FW	(Republic of Ireland) IRL	Andy Keogh	3	0	0	3	0	0	0	0	0
24	MF	(Australia) AUS	Daniel Stynes	3	0	0	2	0	0	1	0	0
2	DF	(Australia) AUS	Jason Geria	2	0	0	2	0	0	0	0	0
6	MF	(Australia) AUS	Osama Malik	2	0	0	2	0	0	0	0	0
8	DF	(Japan) JPN	Kosuke Ota	2	0	0	2	0	0	0	0	0
15	MF	(Australia) AUS	Brandon Wilson	2	0	0	0	0	0	2	0	0
29	DF	(Curaçao) CUW	Darryl Lachman	2	0	0	2	0	0	0	0	0
33	GK	(Australia) AUS	Liam Reddy	2	0	0	2	0	0	0	0	0
	MF	(England) ENG	Declan Hughes	2	0	0	0	0	0	2	0	0
1	GK	(Australia) AUS	Tando Velaphi	1	0	0	1	0	0	0	0	0
7	FW	(Australia) AUS	Chris Ikonomidis	1	0	0	1	0	0	0	0	0
11	FW	(Australia) AUS	Joel Chianese	1	0	0	1	0	0	0	0	0
18	FW	(Australia) AUS	Nicholas D'Agostino	1	0	0	1	0	0	0	0	0
22	DF	(Australia) AUS	Joshua Rawlins	1	0	0	1	0	0	0	0	0
37	DF	(Australia) AUS	Riley Warland	1	0	0	1	0	0	0	0	0

- Source: Soccerway
- (yellow card) = Number of bookings; (second yellow card) = Number of sending offs after a second yellow card; (red card) = Number of sending offs by a direct red card.
