= 2020–21 Newcastle United F.C. season =

Newcastle United
2020–21 season
- Owner: Mike Ashley
- Managing Director: Lee Charnley
- Head coach: Steve Bruce
- Stadium: St James' Park
- Premier League: 12th
- FA Cup: Third round
- EFL Cup: Quarter-finals
- Top goalscorer: League: Callum Wilson (12); All: Callum Wilson (12)
- Highest home attendance: 10,000 (19 May 2021 vs Sheffield United, PL round 37)
- Average home league attendance: 10,000
- Biggest win: 7–0 (23 Sep 2020 v Morecambe, EFL Cup third round)
- Biggest defeat: 0–3 (20 Sep 2020 & 20 Mar 2021 v Brighton & Hove Albion, PL round 2 & round 29); 1–4 (17 Oct 2020 v Manchester United, PL round 5); 2–5 (16 Dec 2020 v Leeds United, PL round 13); 0–3 (18 Jan 2021 v Arsenal, PL round 19)
Home colours	Away colours	Third colours

The 2020–21 Newcastle United Football Club season was the club's 128th season in existence and the club's 4th consecutive season in the top flight of English football. In addition to the domestic league, Newcastle United participated in this season's editions of the FA Cup and the EFL Cup.

== First team ==
Position	Staff
Head Coach	(England) Steve Bruce
Coach	(England) Steve Agnew
Coach	(England) Stephen Clemence
Coach	(England) Steve Harper
Coach	(England) Graeme Jones
Head of Goalkeeping	(England) Simon Smith
Head of Medicine	(England) Paul Catterson
Fitness Coach	(Spain) Cristian Martínez
Head Physiotherapist	(England) Derek Wright
Physiotherapist	(England) Sean Beech
Physiotherapist	(England) Michael Harding
Physiotherapist	(Spain) Daniel Marti
Massage Therapist	(England) Wayne Farrage
Head of Recruitment	(England) Steve Nickson
Head of Performance Analysis	(England) Tom Coffield
Head of Sports Science	(England) Jamie Harley

== Transfers ==
=== Transfers in ===
Date	Position	Nationality	Name	From	Fee	Team	Ref.
3 July 2020	GK	(England)	Mark Gillespie	(Scotland) Motherwell	Free transfer	First team	
23 July 2020	DM	(England)	Niall Brookwell	(England) Liverpool	Free transfer	Under-23s	
24 August 2020	CM	(Republic of Ireland)	Jeff Hendrick	(England) Burnley	Free transfer	First team	
7 September 2020	LW	(Scotland)	Ryan Fraser	(England) AFC Bournemouth	Free transfer	First team	
7 September 2020	CF	(England)	Callum Wilson	(England) AFC Bournemouth	£20,000,000	First team	
8 September 2020	LB	(Northern Ireland)	Jamal Lewis	(England) Norwich City	£15,000,000	First team	
5 October 2020	AM	(Peru)	Rodrigo Vilca	(Peru) Deportivo Municipal	Undisclosed	Under-23s	
16 October 2020	CB	(South Africa)	Bradley Cross	(Germany) Schalke 04	Free transfer	Under-23s	
22 October 2020	CF	(France)	Florent Indalecio	(Australia) Fraser Park	Free transfer	Under-23s	
8 January 2021	MF	(England)	Jay Turner-Cooke	(England) Sunderland	Undisclosed	Academy	

=== Transfers out ===
Date	Position	Nationality	Name	To	Fee	Team	Ref.
1 July 2020	CF	(England)	Luke Charman	(England) Darlington	Released	Under-23s	
1 July 2020	DM	(England)	Jack Colback	(England) Nottingham Forest	Released	First team	
1 July 2020	GK	(Republic of Ireland)	Rob Elliot	(England) Watford	Released	First team	
1 July 2020	LW	(Spain)	Víctor Fernández	(Romania) Viitorul Constanța	Released	Under-23s	
1 July 2020	LB	(England)	Liam Gibson	(England) Morecambe	Released	Under-23s	
1 July 2020	GK	(England)	Nathan Harker	Unattached	Released	Under-23s	
1 July 2020	RB	(England)	Jamie Sterry	(England) Hartlepool	Released	First team	
18 August 2020	CB	(England)	Jack Leckie	(England) Burnley	Undisclosed	Under-23s	
2 October 2020	CM	(England)	Daniel Barlaser	(England) Rotherham United	Undisclosed	First team	
7 January 2021	LW	(England)	Rolando Aarons	(England) Huddersfield Town	Undisclosed	First team	
1 February 2021	RB	(United States)	DeAndre Yedlin	(Turkey) Galatasaray	Free transfer	First team	
11 February 2021	LB	(Morocco)	Achraf Lazaar	(England) Watford	Free transfer	First team	

=== Loans in ===
Date from	Position	Nationality	Name	From	Date until	Team	Ref.
1 February 2021	CM	(England)	Joe Willock	(England) Arsenal	End of season	First team	

=== Loans out ===
Date from	Position	Nationality	Name	To	Date until	Team	Ref.
5 August 2020	GK	(England)	Jake Turner	(England) Morecambe	12 January 2021	Under-23's	
13 August 2020	RW	(England)	Thomas Allan	(England) Accrington Stanley	12 January 2021	Under-23's	
16 August 2020	GK	(England)	Freddie Woodman	(Wales) Swansea City	End of season	First team	
24 August 2020	CB	(England)	Kelland Watts	(England) Plymouth Argyle	End of season	Under-23's	
28 August 2020	MF	(Liberia)	Mo Sangare	(England) Accrington Stanley	End of season	Under-23's	
11 September 2020	CB	(France)	Florian Lejeune	(Spain) Deportivo Alavés	End of season	First team	
16 September 2020	CF	(Japan)	Yoshinori Muto	(Spain) Eibar	End of season	First team	
1 October 2020	CB	(England)	Lewis Cass	(England) Hartlepool United	End of season	Under-23's	
2 October 2020	CF	(Denmark)	Elias Sørensen	(Netherlands) Almere City	End of season	Under-23's	
14 October 2020	DM	(England)	Jack Young	(England) Tranmere Rovers	12 January 2021	Under-23's	

== Pre-season and friendlies ==
Win Draw Loss Postponed Fixtures

25 August 2020 Friendly	Crewe Alexandra	0–3	Newcastle United	Little Ouseburn
14:00 BST		Report	Carroll 39'; Atsu 47'; Fernández 72'	Stadium: Queen Ethelburga's Collegiate; Attendance: 0

29 August 2020 Friendly	Newcastle United	2–1	Barnsley	Newcastle upon Tyne
15:00 BST	Carroll 27'; Murphy 77' (pen.)	Report	Ritzmaier 54'	Stadium: Darsley Park; Attendance: 0

1 September 2020 Friendly	Middlesbrough	5–1	Newcastle United	Hurworth-on-Tees
13:00 BST	Assombalonga 9', 23'; Tavernier 34'; Hall 50'; Walker 83' (pen.)	Report	Saint-Maximin 39'	Stadium: Rockliffe Park; Attendance: 0

5 September 2020 Friendly	Newcastle United	0–1	Stoke City	Newcastle upon Tyne
13:00 BST		Report	Clucas 18'	Stadium: St James' Park; Attendance: 0

== Competitions ==
=== Overview ===
Competition	First match	Last match	Starting round	Final position	Record							
Competition	First match	Last match	Starting round	Final position	Pld	W	D	L	GF	GA	GD	Win %
Premier League	12 September 2020	23 May 2021	Matchday 1	12th	38	12	9	17	46	62	−16	31.58
FA Cup	9 January 2021		Third round	Third round	1	0	0	1	0	2	−2	0.00
EFL Cup	15 September 2020	22 December 2020	Second round	Quarter-finals	4	2	1	1	9	2	+7	50.00
Total					43	14	10	19	55	66	−11	32.56

Last updated: 23 May 2021
Source: Soccerway

=== Premier League ===
==== League table ====
Pos	Team	Pld	W	D	L	GF	GA	GD	Pts
10	Everton	38	17	8	13	47	48	−1	59
11	Aston Villa	38	16	7	15	55	46	+9	55
12	Newcastle United	38	12	9	17	46	62	−16	45
13	Wolverhampton Wanderers	38	12	9	17	36	52	−16	45
14	Crystal Palace	38	12	8	18	41	66	−25	44

Source: Premier League
Rules for classification: 1) Points; 2) Goal difference; 3) Goals scored; 4) If the champions, relegated teams or qualified teams for UEFA competitions cannot be determined by rules 1 to 3, rules 4.1 to 4.3 are applied – 4.1) Points gained in head-to-head record between such teams; 4.2) Away goals scored in head-to-head record between such teams; 4.3) Play-offs

==== Results summary ====
Overall								Home						Away					
Pld	W	D	L	GF	GA	GD	Pts	W	D	L	GF	GA	GD	W	D	L	GF	GA	GD
38	12	9	17	46	62	−16	45	6	5	8	26	33	−7	6	4	9	20	29	−9

Last updated: 23 May 2021.
Source: Premier League

==== Results by matchday ====
Matchday	1	2	3	4	5	6	7	8	9	10	11	12	13	14	15	16	17	18	19	20	21	22	23	24	25	26	27	28	29	30	31	32	33	34	35	36	37	38
Ground	A	H	A	H	H	A	H	A	H	A	A	H	A	H	A	H	H	A	A	H	A	H	H	A	A	H	A	H	A	H	A	H	A	H	A	H	H	A
Result	W	L	D	W	L	D	W	L	L	W	L	W	L	D	L	D	L	L	L	L	W	L	W	L	L	D	D	D	L	D	W	W	D	L	W	L	W	W
Position	4	13	10	9	13	14	11	13	15	13	12	14	12	13	14	15	15	15	16	16	15	16	16	17	17	17	16	17	17	17	17	15	16	17	15	16	15	12

Updated to match(es) played on 23 May 2021. Source:
A = Away; H = Home; W = Win; D = Draw; L = Loss

==== Matches ====
The 2020–21 season fixtures were released on 20 August.

12 September 2020 1	West Ham United	0–2	Newcastle United	Stratford
20:00 BST	Fredericks (yellow card) 54'; Yarmolenko (yellow card) 70'	Report	Hayden (yellow card) 13'; Wilson 56'; Manquillo (yellow card) 68'; Hendrick 87'	Stadium: London Stadium; Attendance: 0 Referee: Stuart Attwell
Note: Live on Sky Sports

20 September 2020 2	Newcastle United	0–3	Brighton & Hove Albion	Newcastle upon Tyne
14:00 BST	Shelvey (yellow card) 12'; Lewis (yellow card) 25'; Lascelles (yellow card) 34'	Report	Maupay 4' (pen.), 7'; Connolly 83'; Bissouma (red card) 87'	Stadium: St James' Park; Attendance: 0 Referee: Kevin Friend

27 September 2020 3	Tottenham Hotspur	1–1	Newcastle United	Tottenham
14:00 BST	Lucas 25'; Winks (yellow card) 90+6'	Report	Shelvey (yellow card) 44'; Joelinton (yellow card) 53'; Lewis (yellow card) 82'; Hayden (yellow card) 90'; Wilson 90+7' (pen.)	Stadium: Tottenham Hotspur Stadium; Attendance: 0 Referee: Peter Bankes

3 October 2020 4	Newcastle United	3–1	Burnley	Newcastle upon Tyne
20:00 BST	Saint-Maximin 14'; Joelinton (yellow card) 36'; Lewis (yellow card) 49'; Wilson 65', 77' (pen.)	Report	Tarkowski (yellow card) 37'; Barnes (yellow card) 40'; Westwood 61'; McNeil (yellow card) 69'	Stadium: St James' Park; Attendance: 0 Referee: David Coote

17 October 2020 5	Newcastle United	1–4	Manchester United	Newcastle upon Tyne
20:00 BST	Shaw 2' (o.g.); Krafth (yellow card) 67'	Report	Maguire 23'; James (yellow card) 37'; Fernandes 86'; Wan-Bissaka 90'; Rashford 90+6'	Stadium: St James' Park; Attendance: 0 Referee: Craig Pawson

25 October 2020 6	Wolverhampton Wanderers	1–1	Newcastle United	Wolverhampton
16:30 GMT	Jiménez 80'	Report	Almirón (yellow card) 40'; Murphy 89'	Stadium: Molineux; Attendance: 0 Referee: Lee Mason

1 November 2020 7	Newcastle United	2–1	Everton	Newcastle upon Tyne
14:00 GMT	C. Wilson (yellow card) 55', (goal) 56' (pen.), 84'; Murphy (yellow card) 90+5'	Report	Nkounkou (yellow card) 32'; Mina (yellow card) 70'; Allan (yellow card) 72'; Doucouré (yellow card) 88'; Calvert-Lewin 90+2'	Stadium: St James' Park; Attendance: 0 Referee: Stuart Attwell

6 November 2020 8	Southampton	2–0	Newcastle United	Southampton
20:00 GMT	Adams 7'; Romeu (yellow card) 27'; Armstrong 82'	Report	Fernández (yellow card) 43'; Longstaff (yellow card) 90'	Stadium: St Mary's Stadium; Attendance: 0 Referee: Peter Bankes

21 November 2020 9	Newcastle United	0–2	Chelsea	Newcastle upon Tyne
12:30 GMT	Hayden (yellow card) 39'; Murphy (yellow card) 45'	Report	Fernández 10' (o.g.); Abraham 65'	Stadium: St James' Park; Attendance: 0 Referee: Craig Pawson

27 November 2020 10	Crystal Palace	0–2	Newcastle United	Selhurst
20:00 GMT	Dann (yellow card) 78'; Schlupp (yellow card) 90+3'	Report	Fernández (yellow card) 17'; Longstaff (yellow card) 60'; Wilson 88'; Joelinton 90'	Stadium: Selhurst Park; Attendance: 0 Referee: Graham Scott

12 December 2020 12	Newcastle United	2–1	West Bromwich Albion	Newcastle upon Tyne
15:00 GMT	Almirón 1'; Lewis (yellow card) 35'; Gayle 82'; Wilson (yellow card) 90+5'	Report	Furlong (yellow card) 35', (goal) 50'; Ajayi (yellow card) 69'; Ivanović (yellow card) 88'	Stadium: St James' Park; Attendance: 0 Referee: Darren England

16 December 2020 13	Leeds United	5–2	Newcastle United	Leeds
18:00 GMT	Bamford 35'; Klich (yellow card) 37'; Phillips (yellow card) 48'; Rodrigo 61'; Raphinha (yellow card) 67'; Dallas 77'; Alioski 85'; Harrison 88'	Report	Hendrick 26'; Hayden (yellow card) 50'; Clark 65'	Stadium: Elland Road; Attendance: 0 Referee: Simon Hooper

19 December 2020 14	Newcastle United	1–1	Fulham	Newcastle upon Tyne
20:00 GMT	Wilson 64' (pen.); Clark (yellow card) 72'	Report	Ritchie 42' (o.g.); Andersen (yellow card) 46', (red card) 62'; Robinson (yellow card) 81'; Hector (yellow card) 90+6'	Stadium: St James' Park; Attendance: 0 Referee: Graham Scott

26 December 2020 15	Manchester City	2–0	Newcastle United	Manchester
20:00 GMT	Gündoğan 14'; Rodri (yellow card) 34'; Torres 55'; Cancelo (yellow card) 88'	Report	Ritchie (yellow card) 64'; Schär (yellow card) 80'	Stadium: City of Manchester Stadium; Attendance: 0 Referee: Andre Marriner

30 December 2020 16	Newcastle United	0–0	Liverpool	Newcastle upon Tyne
20:00 GMT	Clark (yellow card) 12'; Hayden (yellow card) 85'	Report	Fabinho (yellow card) 49'; Milner (yellow card) 65'; Phillips (yellow card) 78'	Stadium: St James' Park; Attendance: 0 Referee: Paul Tierney

3 January 2021 17	Newcastle United	1–2	Leicester City	Newcastle upon Tyne
14:15 GMT	Carroll 82'	Report	Maddison 55'; Tielemans (yellow card) 60', (goal) 72'; Justin (yellow card) 81'	Stadium: St James' Park; Attendance: 0 Referee: Robert Jones

12 January 2021 18	Sheffield United	1–0	Newcastle United	Sheffield
18:00 GMT	Sharp 73' (pen.), (yellow card) 80'; McGoldrick (yellow card) 90'	Report	Fraser (yellow card) 42' (yellow-red card) 45'; Darlow (yellow card) 69'; Schär (yellow card) 86'; Hayden (yellow card) 90+5'	Stadium: Bramall Lane; Attendance: 0 Referee: Andrew Madley

18 January 2021 19	Arsenal	3–0	Newcastle United	Holloway
20:00 GMT	Aubameyang 50', 77'; Saka 60'	Report		Stadium: Emirates Stadium; Attendance: 0 Referee: David Coote

23 January 2021 11	Aston Villa	2–0	Newcastle United	Aston
20:00 GMT	Watkins 13'; Traoré 42'	Report	Schär (yellow card) 26'; Carroll (yellow card) 54'; Lascelles (yellow card) 57'	Stadium: Villa Park; Attendance: 0 Referee: Simon Hooper
Note: The match was originally scheduled for 4 December 2020, but was postponed due to safety concerns following a COVID-19 outbreak at the Newcastle United training ground.

26 January 2021 20	Newcastle United	1–2	Leeds United	Newcastle upon Tyne
18:00 GMT	Almirón 57'; Schär (yellow card) 86'	Report	Raphinha 17'; Alioski (yellow card) 54'; Harrison 61', (yellow card) 89'; Rodrigo (yellow card) 86'	Stadium: St James' Park; Attendance: 0 Referee: Anthony Taylor

30 January 2021 21	Everton	0–2	Newcastle United	Liverpool
12:30 GMT	Sigurðsson (yellow card) 33'; Keane (yellow card) 61'; Rodríguez (yellow card) 79'	Report	Lascelles (yellow card) 4'; Shelvey (yellow card) 21'; Wilson 73', 90+3'; Darlow (yellow card) 84'; Hendrick (yellow card) 88'	Stadium: Goodison Park; Attendance: 0 Referee: Stuart Attwell

2 February 2021 22	Newcastle United	1–2	Crystal Palace	Newcastle upon Tyne
20:15 GMT	Shelvey 2', (yellow card) 29'	Report	Riedewald 21'; Cahill 25'; Clyne (yellow card) 51'; Milivojević (yellow card) 72'; Ayew (yellow card) 90+3'	Stadium: St James' Park; Attendance: 0 Referee: Darren England

6 February 2021 23	Newcastle United	3–2	Southampton	Newcastle upon Tyne
15:00 GMT	Hendrick (yellow card) 11' (yellow-red card) 50'; Willock 16'; Almirón 26', 45+4'; Krafth (yellow card) 45+3'; Darlow (yellow card) 90+6'	Report	Minamino 30'; Ward-Prowse 48'; Bednarek (yellow card) 73'	Stadium: St James' Park; Attendance: 0 Referee: Craig Pawson

15 February 2021 24	Chelsea	2–0	Newcastle United	London
20:00 GMT	Giroud 31'; Werner 39'	Report		Stadium: Stamford Bridge; Attendance: 0 Referee: Peter Bankes

21 February 2021 25	Manchester United	3–1	Newcastle United	Manchester
19:00 GMT	Rashford 30'; Fernandes (yellow card) 38', (goal) 75' (pen.); James 57'	Report	Saint-Maximin 36'; Hayden (yellow card) 38'; Joelinton (yellow card) 39'	Stadium: Old Trafford; Attendance: 0 Referee: Paul Tierney

27 February 2021 26	Newcastle United	1–1	Wolverhampton Wanderers	Newcastle upon Tyne
20:00 GMT	Hayden (yellow card) 19'; Clark (yellow card) 43'; Lascelles 52'	Report	Neves 73'	Stadium: St James' Park; Attendance: 0 Referee: Mike Dean

7 March 2021 27	West Bromwich Albion	0–0	Newcastle United	West Bromwich
12:00 GMT		Report		Stadium: The Hawthorns; Attendance: 0 Referee: Martin Atkinson

12 March 2021 28	Newcastle United	1–1	Aston Villa	Newcastle upon Tyne
20:00 GMT	Krafth (yellow card) 52'; Lascelles (yellow card) 68', (goal) 90+4'	Report	McGinn (yellow card) 74'; Sanson (yellow card) 77'; Mings (yellow card) 78'; Clark 86' (o.g.)	Stadium: St James' Park; Attendance: 0 Referee: Paul Tierney

20 March 2021 29	Brighton & Hove Albion	3–0	Newcastle United	Falmer
20:00 GMT	Trossard 45+3'; Welbeck 51'; Maupay 68'	Report	Dummett (yellow card) 63'	Stadium: Falmer Stadium; Attendance: 0 Referee: Anthony Taylor

4 April 2021 30	Newcastle United	2–2	Tottenham Hotspur	Newcastle upon Tyne
15:00 BST	Joelinton 28'; Dummett (yellow card) 65'; Shelvey (yellow card) 72'; Almirón (yellow card) 85'; Willock 86'	Report	Kane 30', 34'; Lo Celso (yellow card) 45'; Tanganga (yellow card) 63'	Stadium: St James' Park; Attendance: 0 Referee: Craig Pawson

11 April 2021 31	Burnley	1–2	Newcastle United	Burnley
12:00 BST	Vydra 18'; Brownhill (yellow card) 69'	Report	Murphy 59'; Saint-Maximin 64'	Stadium: Turf Moor; Attendance: 0 Referee: Anthony Taylor

17 April 2021 32	Newcastle United	3–2	West Ham United	Newcastle upon Tyne
12:30 BST	Shelvey (yellow card) 16'; Diop 36' (o.g.); Joelinton 41'; Willock 82'; Murphy (yellow card) 90+6'	Report	Dawson (yellow card) 12' (yellow-red card) 36'; Diop 73'; Lingard 80' (pen.)	Stadium: St James' Park; Attendance: 0 Referee: Kevin Friend

24 April 2021 33	Liverpool	1–1	Newcastle United	Liverpool
12:30 BST	Salah 3'; Kabak (yellow card) 9'; Fabinho (yellow card) 89'	Report	Fernández (yellow card) 16'; Willock 90+5'	Stadium: Anfield; Attendance: 0 Referee: Andre Marriner

2 May 2021 34	Newcastle United	0–2	Arsenal	Newcastle upon Tyne
14:00 BST	Almirón (yellow card) 31'; Fernández (yellow card) 62'; Schär (red card) 90'	Report	Elneny 5'; Xhaka (yellow card) 20'; Aubameyang 66'	Stadium: St. James' Park; Attendance: 0 Referee: Mike Dean

7 May 2021 35	Leicester City	2–4	Newcastle United	Leicester
20:00 BST	Iheanacho (yellow card) 72', (goal) 87'; Albrighton 80'	Report	Willock 22'; Dummett 34'; Krafth (yellow card) 56'; Wilson 64', 73'	Stadium: King Power Stadium; Attendance: 0 Referee: Darren England

14 May 2021 36	Newcastle United	3–4	Manchester City	Newcastle upon Tyne
20:00 BST	Krafth 25'; Ritchie (yellow card) 36'; Joelinton 45+6' (pen.); Shelvey (yellow card) 59'; Willock (penalty missed) 61', 62'	Report	Cancelo 39', (yellow card) 56'; Torres 42', 64', 66'; Rodri (yellow card) 44'	Stadium: St. James' Park; Attendance: 0 Referee: Kevin Friend

19 May 2021 37	Newcastle United	1–0	Sheffield United	Newcastle upon Tyne
18:00 BST	Willock 45+4'	Report	Norwood (yellow card) 24'; Stevens (yellow card) 31'	Stadium: St. James' Park; Attendance: 10,000; Referee: Robert Jones

23 May 2021 38	Fulham	0–2	Newcastle United	Fulham
16:00 BST	Tete (yellow card) 75'	Report	Willock 23'; Schär 88' (pen.)	Stadium: Craven Cottage; Attendance: 2,000; Referee: Chris Kavanagh

=== FA Cup ===
The third round draw was made on 30 November, with Premier League and EFL Championship clubs all entering the competition.

9 January 2021 Third round	Arsenal	2–0 (a.e.t.)	Newcastle United	Holloway
17:30 GMT	Cédric (yellow card) 45+1'; Smith Rowe (yellow card) 90+4', (goal) 109'; Aubameyang 117'	Report	Lascelles (yellow card) 9'; Carroll (yellow card) 26'; Clark (yellow card) 90+1'; Hayden (yellow card) 90+1'	Stadium: Emirates Stadium; Attendance: 0 Referee: Chris Kavanagh

=== EFL Cup ===
The draw for both the second and third round were confirmed on September 6, live on Sky Sports by Phil Babb. The fourth round draw was conducted on 17 September 2020 by Laura Woods and Lee Hendrie live on Sky Sports.

15 September 2020 Second round	Newcastle United	1–0	Blackburn Rovers	Newcastle upon Tyne
19:30 BST	Fraser 35'	Report		Stadium: St James' Park; Attendance: 0 Referee: Jarred Gillett

23 September 2020 Third round	Morecambe	0–7	Newcastle United	Morecambe
19:45 BST	Diagouraga (red card) 33'	Report	Joelinton 5', 31'; Almirón 20'; Murphy 27'; Hayden 45+2'; Lascelles 51'; Lavelle 90+2' (o.g.)	Stadium: Globe Arena; Attendance: 0 Referee: Darren Drysdale

30 September 2020 Fourth round	Newport County	1–1 (4–5 p)	Newcastle United	Newport
19:45 BST	Abrahams 5'; Amond (yellow card) 31'	Report	Shelvey (yellow card) 16', (goal) 87'	Stadium: Rodney Parade; Attendance: 0 Referee: John Brooks
	Penalties
	Demetriou (penalty scored); Abrahams (penalty scored); Sheehan (penalty scored); Taylor (penalty missed); Dolan (penalty scored); Cooper (penalty missed)		(penalty scored) Wilson; (penalty missed) Joelinton; (penalty scored) Schär; (penalty scored) Shelvey; (penalty scored) Murphy; (penalty scored) Longstaff

22 December 2020 Quarter-finals	Brentford	1–0	Newcastle United	Brentford
17:30 GMT	Dasilva 66'	Report	Shelvey (yellow card) 70'	Stadium: Brentford Community Stadium; Attendance: 0 Referee: Robert Jones

== Statistics ==
=== Appearances and goals ===
No.	Pos	Nat	Player	Total		Premier League		EFL Cup		FA Cup	
No.	Pos	Nat	Player	Apps	Goals	Apps	Goals	Apps	Goals	Apps	Goals
Goalkeepers
1	GK	(Slovakia) SVK	Martin Dúbravka	14	0	13	0	0	0	1	0
26	GK	(England) ENG	Karl Darlow	26	0	25	0	1	0	0	0
29	GK	(England) ENG	Mark Gillespie	3	0	0	0	3	0	0	0
Defenders
2	DF	(Republic of Ireland) IRL	Ciaran Clark	26	1	21+1	1	3	0	1	0
3	DF	(Wales) WAL	Paul Dummett	16	1	14+1	1	0	0	1	0
5	DF	(Switzerland) SUI	Fabian Schär	19	1	13+5	1	0+1	0	0	0
6	DF	(England) ENG	Jamaal Lascelles	21	3	19	2	1	1	1	0
15	DF	(Northern Ireland) NIR	Jamal Lewis	26	0	20+4	0	2	0	0	0
17	DF	(Sweden) SWE	Emil Krafth	20	1	14+2	1	3	0	1	0
18	DF	(Argentina) ARG	Federico Fernández	25	0	24	0	1	0	0	0
19	DF	(Spain) ESP	Javier Manquillo	15	0	10+3	0	2	0	0	0
Midfielders
4	MF	(England) ENG	Matty Longstaff	5	0	4+1	0	0	0	0	0
8	MF	(England) ENG	Jonjo Shelvey	32	2	29+1	1	2	1	0	0
10	MF	(France) FRA	Allan Saint-Maximin	26	3	19+6	3	0+1	0	0	0
11	MF	(Scotland) SCO	Matt Ritchie	21	0	15+3	0	2	0	0+1	0
14	MF	(England) ENG	Isaac Hayden	27	1	22+2	0	2	1	1	0
16	MF	(Republic of Ireland) IRL	Jeff Hendrick	23	2	17+5	2	0	0	1	0
21	MF	(Scotland) SCO	Ryan Fraser	22	1	9+9	0	3+1	1	0	0
23	MF	(England) ENG	Jacob Murphy	32	3	18+9	2	3+1	1	0+1	0
24	MF	(Paraguay) PAR	Miguel Almirón	39	5	28+6	4	4	1	1	0
28	MF	(England) ENG	Joe Willock	14	8	11+3	8	0	0	0	0
36	MF	(England) ENG	Sean Longstaff	27	0	15+7	0	4	0	1	0
57	MF	(England) ENG	Elliot Anderson	2	0	0+1	0	0	0	0+1	0
Forwards
7	FW	(England) ENG	Andy Carroll	22	1	4+14	1	1+2	0	1	0
9	FW	(Brazil) BRA	Joelinton	36	6	23+8	4	2+2	2	1	0
12	FW	(England) ENG	Dwight Gayle	20	1	4+14	1	0+1	0	0+1	0
13	FW	(England) ENG	Callum Wilson	28	12	23+3	12	1+1	0	0	0
Player(s) who left permanently but featured this season
22	DF	(United States) USA	DeAndre Yedlin	10	0	5+1	0	3	0	0+1	0
32	MF	(England) ENG	Daniel Barlaser	2	0	0	0	1+1	0	0	0

Last updated: 23 May 2021
Source: Competitions
