= 2025 National Premier Leagues NSW Men's =

Australian men's football Season

NPL NSW Men's
- Season: 2025
- Dates: 7 February – 31 August
- Champions: APIA Leichhardt
- Premiers: NWS Spirit
- Relegated: Mt Druitt Town Rangers; Central Coast Mariners Youth
- Matches: 247
- Goals: 717 (2.9 per match)
- Best player: Nicholas Olsen (Wollongong)
- Top goalscorer: Alec Urosevski – 24 goals (Rockdale Ilinden)
- Best goalkeeper: Danijel Nizic (Sutherland)
- Biggest home win: Rockdale Ilinden 8–1 Western Sydney Wanderers Youth (19 April 2025)
- Biggest away win: Blacktown City 0–5 Sydney FC Youth (11 May)
- Highest scoring: Rockdale Ilinden 8–1 Western Sydney Wanderers Youth (19 April)
- Longest winning run: 8 games – Marconi (16 March – 2 May); NWS Spirit (21 June - 16 August)
- Longest unbeaten run: 13 games – Marconi (8 February – 2 May)
- Longest winless run: 14 games – CCM Youth (15 March – 22 June)
- Longest losing run: 7 games – CCM Youth (23 March – 11 May)

The 2025 National Premier Leagues NSW was the 13th season of the National Premier Leagues (NPL) in New South Wales, Australia. The regular season was held between 7 February and 31 August, followed by a finals series.

Six teams (APIA Leichhardt, Marconi Stallions, Sydney Olympic, Sydney United, Wollongong Wolves and NWS Spirit (the 2025 NPL Premiers) qualified for the inaugural season of the Australian Championship, which is scheduled to begin in October 2025.

Marconi Stallions were the defending champions.

== Teams ==
=== Pre-season changes ===
2024 League	Promoted to league	Relegated from league
NPL NSW	Mt Druitt Town Rangers FC	Hills United

Locations of teams in the 2025 National Premier Leagues NSW

=== Stadiums and locations ===
Team	Head coach	Location	Stadium	Capacity
APIA Leichhardt	(Australia) Franco Parisi	Leichhardt	Lambert Park	7,000
APIA Leichhardt	(Australia) Franco Parisi	Leichhardt	Leichhardt Oval	20,000
Blacktown City	(Australia) Mark Crittenden	Blacktown	Landen Stadium	7,500
Central Coast Mariners Academy	(Brazil) Lucas Vilela	Gosford	Pluim Park	2,000
Manly United	(Australia) Jimmy Snedden (interim)	Dee Why	Cromer Park	5,000
Marconi Stallions	(Australia) Peter Tsekenis	Fairfield	Marconi Stadium	9,000
Mount Druitt Town Rangers	(Australia) Andrew Montgomery	Mount Druitt	Popondetta Park	4,000
NWS Spirit	(Australia) David Perkovic	Macquarie Park	Christie Park	1,000
Rockdale Ilinden	(Australia) Paul Dee	Rockdale	Rockdale Ilinden Sports Centre	5,000
St George FC	(Australia) Fabian Miceli	St George	Barton Park	1,500
St George City	(Australia) Manny Spanoudakis	St George	Penshurst Park	1,000
Sutherland Sharks FC	(Australia) Steven Zoric	Sutherland	Seymour Shaw Park	5,000
Sydney FC Youth	(Australia) Jimmy Van Weeren	Moore Park	Rockdale Ilinden Sports Centre	5,000
Sydney Olympic	(Australia) Labinot Haliti	Belmore; Carlton	Belmore Sports Ground	20,000
Sydney Olympic	(Australia) Labinot Haliti	Belmore; Carlton	Jubilee Stadium	20,500
Sydney United	(Australia) Ante Juric	Edensor Park	Sydney United Sports Centre	12,000
Western Sydney Wanderers Youth	(Australia) Richie Cardozo	Blacktown	Wanderers Football Park	4,500
Wollongong Wolves	(Australia) Julio Miranda (interim)	Wollongong	WIN Stadium	22,000
Wollongong Wolves	(Australia) Julio Miranda (interim)	Wollongong	Macedonia Park	10,000

Note: Sutherland Sharks FC announced that the club would re-brand as 'Sharks FC' on 31 January, and played round 1 under the new name, before reverting to Sutherland Sharks FC a week later following widespread negative feedback for the new name.

=== Managerial changes ===
Team	Outgoing manager	Manner of departure	Date of vacancy	Position in table	Incoming manager	Date of appointment
St George City	Mirko Jurilj	N/A	23 September 2024	Pre-season	Manny Spanoudakis	23 September 2024
Wollongong Wolves	David Carney	N/A	23 September 2024	Pre-season	Warren Grieve	4 October 2024
St George	Steve Karavatakis	N/A	4 October 2024	Pre-season	Fabian Miceli	4 October 2024
Sydney United	Zeljko Kalac	N/A	29 October 2024	Pre-season	Ante Juric	29 October 2024
Western Sydney Wanderers Youth	Andrew Christiansen	N/A	14 January 2025	Pre-season	Richie Cardozo	14 January 2025

== Regular season ==
=== League table ===
Pos	Team	Pld	W	D	L	GF	GA	GD	Pts	Qualification or relegation
1	NWS Spirit (Q)	30	20	6	4	67	30	+37	66	Qualification to Australian Championship and Finals series
2	APIA Leichhardt (Note: Team pre-qualified to the Australian Championship as a Foundation club.) (C)	30	20	4	6	75	35	+40	64	Qualification to Finals series
3	Marconi Stallions	30	19	5	6	48	29	+19	62	Qualification to Finals series
4	Rockdale Ilinden	30	15	10	5	68	41	+27	55	Qualification to Finals series
5	Blacktown City	30	15	5	10	50	50	0	50	Qualification to Finals series
6	Sydney United 58	30	14	7	9	41	39	+2	49	Qualification to Finals series
7	Sydney Olympic	30	12	7	11	50	38	+12	40 (Note: Western Sydney Wanderers Youth team and Sydney Olympic were deducted three points for breaches of administrative procedures.)	
8	Wollongong Wolves	30	10	10	10	42	38	+4	40	
9	St George City	30	10	7	13	37	42	−5	37	
10	Sydney FC Youth	30	9	7	14	43	46	−3	34	
11	Manly United	30	9	7	14	40	46	−6	34	
12	St George FC	30	8	8	14	44	55	−11	32	
13	Sutherland Sharks	30	7	5	18	28	53	−25	26	
14	Western Sydney Wanderers Youth	30	7	7	16	29	51	−22	25	
15	Central Coast Mariners Academy (R)	30	5	8	17	29	62	−33	23	Qualification for the Relegation play-off
16	Mount Druitt Town Rangers (R)	30	5	7	18	24	60	−36	22	Relegation to 2026 NSW League One

Source: Dribl
Rules for classification: 1) points; 2) goal difference; 3) number of goals scored; 4) head-to-head points; 5) head-to-head goals scored; 6) play-off.
(C) Champions; (Q) Qualified for the phase indicated; (R) Relegated

=== Results ===
Home \ Away	API	BCT	CCM	MAN	MAR	MTD	NWS	ROC	SGC	STG	SUT	SFC	SOL	SUN	WSW	WOL
APIA Leichhardt	—	1–0	5–0	1–0	0–2	5–0	0–3	3–4	1–0	3–3	5–0	2–0	2–0	2–2	6–1	3–3
Blacktown City	4–3	—	1–0	1–1	0–2	2–2	0–4	1–3	3–1	3–2	1–0	0–5	2–2	3–2	1–0	1–0
CCM Academy	2–6	1–4	—	1–1	1–0	2–0	1–3	1–1	0–0	4–2	0–0	0–3	1–1	3–1	0–3	0–2
Manly United	1–2	3–2	5–0	—	0–3	5–0	0–1	1–1	0–2	0–0	0–3	0–6	1–5	0–0	3–2	6–0
Marconi Stallions	3–2	1–1	3–0	4–2	—	2–1	0–5	0–1	3–1	1–1	3–0	1–0	1–1	2–0	1–0	0–3
Mount Druitt Town Rangers	0–2	2–3	1–1	1–0	0–2	—	1–1	2–3	0–1	0–2	0–0	0–0	0–4	0–2	1–2	3–1
NWS Spirit	1–0	4–1	3–1	2–1	1–2	5–0	—	6–3	2–0	2–2	1–1	3–2	2–1	1–1	1–0	1–0
Rockdale Ilinden	1–4	3–0	3–1	0–0	1–2	4–0	1–1	—	2–2	3–1	1–2	2–1	4–0	0–0	8–1	1–1
St George City	0–0	0–2	3–2	1–2	2–1	1–1	3–2	1–4	—	1–2	1–0	5–0	1–1	0–2	1–0	1–1
St George	2–3	3–2	2–0	1–2	2–2	2–3	0–3	1–2	1–3	—	3–0	1–0	2–0	2–4	0–3	2–1
Sutherland Sharks	0–2	1–2	1–0	0–1	0–2	2–0	1–3	2–3	0–3	1–1	—	4–0	1–5	1–2	3–1	1–3
Sydney FC Youth	2–6	3–3	1–0	0–0	0–1	0–2	2–0	2–2	3–1	1–1	2–0	—	0–2	3–1	1–2	2–2
Sydney Olympic	0–1	0–2	3–0	2–5	2–0	1–2	3–0	2–2	2–1	2–1	2–1	1–2	—	4–0	0–1	0–0
Sydney United	2–1	1–0	0–3	1–0	1–2	2–0	0–2	1–3	1–0	1–1	2–2	3–2	2–1	—	2–0	0–0
WSW Youth	0–1	0–4	2–2	2–0	0–1	1–1	2–3	0–0	1–1	3–0	0–1	0–0	1–1	0–3	—	1–1
Wollongong Wolves	0–2	0–1	2–2	2–0	1–1	2–1	1–1	1–3	3–0	2–1	4–0	1–0	0–2	1–2	4–0	—

Source: Football NSW
Legend: Blue = home team win; Yellow = draw; Red = away team win.
For upcoming matches, an "a" indicates there is an article about the rivalry between the two participants.

== Finals series ==
Elimination semi-finals
3	Marconi Stallions (p)	1 (3)
6	Sydney United	1 (2)
4	Rockdale Ilinden	1
5	Blacktown City	0

Preliminary finals
2	APIA Leichhardt	2
3	Marconi Stallions	0
1	NWS Spirit	1
4	Rockdale Ilinden (a.e.t.)	2

Grand final
2	APIA Leichhardt	2
4	Rockdale Ilinden	1

== Regular season statistics ==
=== Top scorers ===
Rank	Player	Club	Goals
1	(Australia) Alec Urosevski	Rockdale Ilinden	24
2	(Australia) Presley Ortiz	APIA Leichardt	18
2	(Australia) Yu Okubo	NWS Spirit	18
4	(Australia) Michael Konestabo	NWS Spirit	15
4	(Australia) Nicholas Olsen	Wollongong Wolves	15

=== Hat-tricks ===
Player	For	Against	Result	Date	Ref.
(Australia) Presley Ortiz	APIA Leichhardt	Central Coast Mariners	6–2 (A)	16 February 2025	
(Australia) Alec Urosevski	Rockdale Ilinden	APIA Leichhardt	3–4 (A)	30 March 2025	
(Australia) Ali Auglah	Rockdale Ilinden	Western Sydney Wanderers Youth	8–1 (H)	19 April 2025	
(Australia) Patrick Antelmi	Sydney United 58	St George FC	4–2 (A)	19 April 2025	
(Australia) Lachlan Scott	Wollongong Wolves	Marconi Stallions	3–0 (A)	10 May 2025	
(Australia) Alen Harbas	Sydney FC Youth	Blacktown City	5–0 (A)	11 May 2025	
(Australia) Mathias Macallister^{5}	Sydney FC Youth	Manly United	6–0 (A)	15 June 2025	
(Scotland) Marc McNulty	St George City	St George FC	3–1 (A)	13 July 2025	

Notes

- (H) – Home team
- (A) – Away team

== Awards ==
=== Men's Team of the Year ===
Team of the Year
Goalkeeper	Danijel Nizic (Sutherland)				Substitutes	James Hilton (Marconi)	Nathan Grimaldi (St George City)
Defenders	Tyron Burnie (Marconi)		Lachlan Griffiths (Marconi)	Troy Danaskos (St George FC)	Substitutes	Jaden Casella (St George FC)	Jai Rose (Central Coast Mariners)
Midfielders	Seiya Kambayashi (APIA)	Takumi Ofuka (NWS Spirit)	Michael Konestabo (NSW Spirit)	Nicholas Olsen (Wollongong)	Substitutes	Carlos de Oliveira (S. Utd 58)	Cyrus Dehmie (S. Olympic)
Forwards	Mark McNulty (St George City)		Yu Okubo (NWS Spirit)	Alec Urosevski (Rockdale)	Substitutes	Presley Ortiz (APIA)	
