= Louis Khoury =

Australian soccer player (born 2000)

Personal information
- Full name: Louis James Khoury
- Date of birth: 8 October 2000 (age 26)
- Place of birth: Baulkham Hills, New South Wales, Australia
- Position: Midfielder

Team information
- Current team: St George City
- Number: 33

Youth career
- 2011–2016: Manchester City
- 2016–2018: Blackburn Rovers

Senior career*
Years	Team	Apps	(Gls)
2018–2019	Curzon Ashton	10	(0)
2020	Central Coast Mariners	1	(0)
2020–2021	Central Coast Mariners Academy	23	(3)
2022	Mt Druitt Town Rangers	17	(2)
2023	Sutherland Sharks	21	(2)
2023	Nejmeh	6	(0)
2024–	St George City FC	25	(8)
- * Club domestic league appearances and goals as of 23 January 2025

Louis James Khoury (born 8 October 2000) is an Australian professional soccer player who plays as a midfielder for Australian club St George City FC.

== Career ==
Khoury joined Manchester City in 2011, at the age of 11 years old, signing a six-year youth deal with the club. At 16 he moved to Blackburn Rovers on a two-year contract. He then played for Curzon Ashton in the 2018–19 National League North.

Ahead of the 2020 season, Khoury moved to Central Coast Mariners, and played for their Academy team in the NPL NSW 2. In 2022, he joined Mt Druitt Town Rangers in the 2022 NPL NSW. Khoury played for Sutherland Sharks in the 2023 NPL NSW.

On 25 July 2023, Khoury signed for Lebanese Premier League side Nejmeh. He moved back to Australia for St George City FC ahead of the 2024 NPL NSW.

== Personal life ==
Born in Australia, Khoury is of Lebanese descent.

== Honours ==
Central Coast Mariners Academy

- NPL NSW 2: 2020

Nejmeh

- Lebanese Premier League: 2023–24
- Lebanese Super Cup: 2023
