= Jason Romero =

Jason Romero may refer to:

- Jason Romero, musician with Canadian folk music duo Pharis and Jason Romero
- Jason Romero (soccer), American soccer player
