= Bayswater City SC =

Football club in Perth, Western Australia

Bayswater City
- Full name: Bayswater City Soccer Club
- Nickname: Inter
- Founded: 1961; 65 years ago
- Ground: Frank Drago Reserve
- Capacity: 5,000
- President: Oriano Colli
- Coach: Matt Sparrow
- League: NPL Western Australia
- 2026: 1st of 12 (premiers & champions)
- Website: http://www.bayswatercity.com.au
Home colours	Away colours

Bayswater City Soccer Club is a soccer club based in Bayswater, Western Australia. They currently compete in the National Premier Leagues Western Australia.

== History ==
The club in its current form was formed as a result of a merger in 1980 between Lathlain Meazza (formed 1973) and Rosemount Juventus (formed 1978) becoming Rosemount Meazza. In 1981 Rosemount Meazza merged with Bayswater United (formed 1963), becoming Bayswater Inter. In 1995 Baywater Inter changed their name to Bayswater City. In 1995 Bayswater City merged with Stirling Panthers to become Bayswater City Panthers. This merger lasted until 2003 when the name Bayswater City returned.

=== 2025 ===
They will also compete in the inaugural 2025 Australian Championship after becoming WA Premiers in the regular season.

=== 2026 ===
After winning back to back NPL WA regular season became premiers are invitee for second time in 2026 Australian Championship.

== Stadium ==
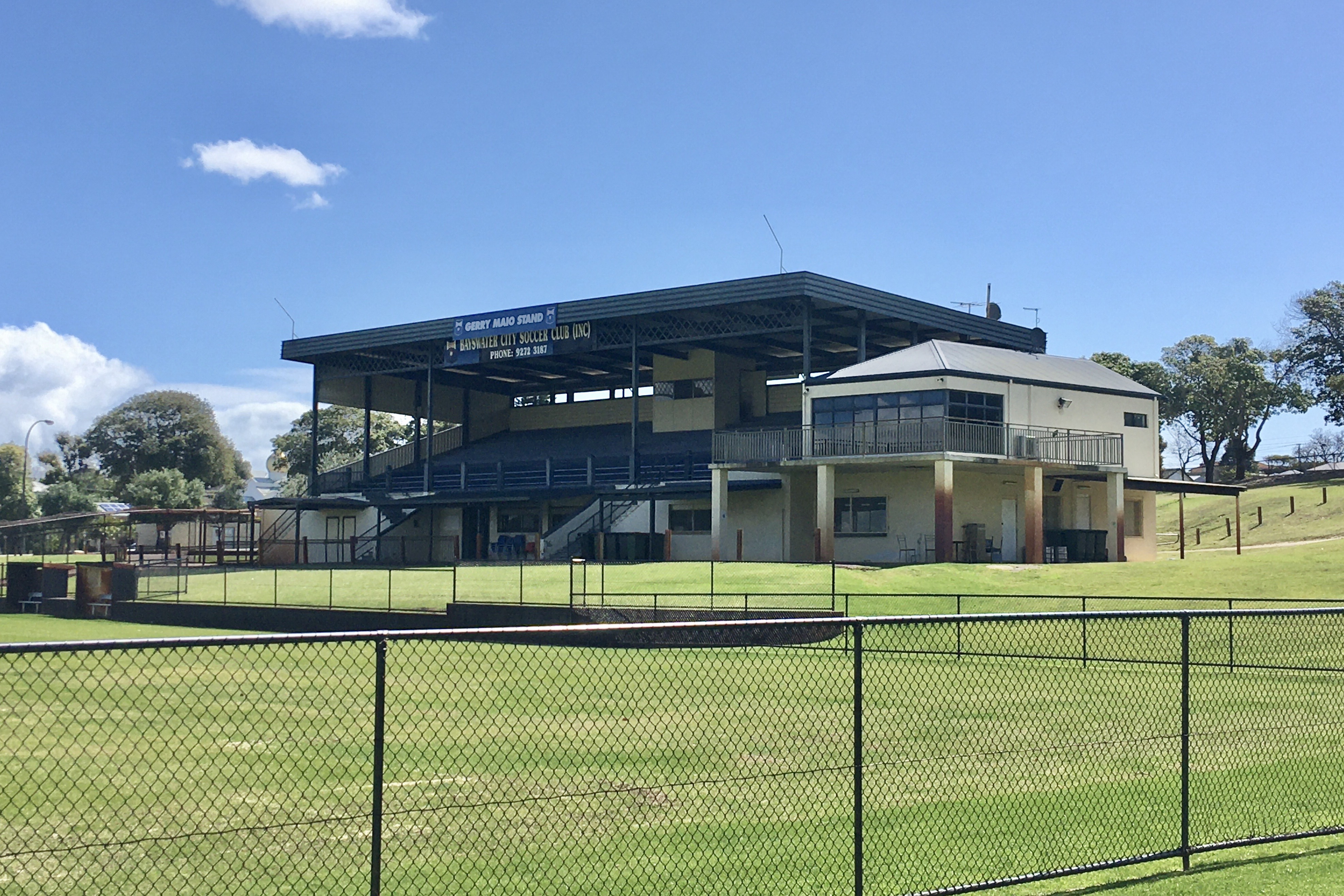
Frank Drago Reserve

The club plays home matches at Frank Drago Reserve.

== Current squad ==
As of 8 October 2025

Note: Flags indicate national team as defined under FIFA eligibility rules; some limited exceptions apply. Players may hold more than one non-FIFA nationality.

No.	Pos.	Nation	Player
1	GK	AUS	Lewis Italiano
2	DF	AUS	Alex Ishida-Livings
4	DF	AUS	Luke Palmateer
5	DF	IRL	Paddy Loughrey
6	DF	ENG	Declan Hughes
7	FW	SCO	Sean McManus
10	FW	AUS	Jason Mirco
12	MF	AUS	Anthony Bafobusha
13	MF	AUS	Gyles Davies
14	FW	AUS	Oli La Galia
15	DF	AUS	Jackson Stephens
16	MF	AUS	Jonathan Corness

No.	Pos.	Nation	Player
17	MF	AUS	Charlie Garnham
18	FW	AUS	Christopher Jackson
19	DF	AUS	Philip Radeski
20	DF	ENG	Sam Mitchinson
21	DF	AUS	Mason Tatafu
24	MF	JPN	Takayuki Sone
25	GK	ENG	Taylor Rae
26	MF	AUS	Aidan Edwards
27	FW	AUS	Deegan Brook
29	FW	AUS	Scotlan Morrison
30	DF	ENG	Thomas Southgate

== Honours ==
National Premier Leagues
Runners-up: 1 2015
NPL/State League Premierships
Winners: 6 (2012, 2014, 2015, 2017, 2025, 2026)
