= Mason Tatafu =

Australian soccer player

Mason Antony Čavka Tatafu
Personal information
- Full name: Mason Antony Čavka Tatafu
- Date of birth: 17 April 2002 (age 24)
- Place of birth: Australia
- Height: 1.87 m (6 ft 2 in)
- Position: Centre-back

Team information
- Current team: St George City FC
- Number: 17

Youth career
- 2010–2014: Perth SC
- 2014–2020: Perth Glory

Senior career*
Years	Team	Apps	(Gls)
2020–2021	Perth Glory NPL	23	(1)
2020–2021	Perth Glory	5	(0)
2021–2022	Hofstra Pride	37	(4)
2022	Long Island Rough Riders	18	(0)
2023–2024	Louisville Cardinals	30	(2)
2024	Des Moines Menace	7	(1)
2025	Hume City	7	(1)
2025	Bayswater City	6	(0)
2026–	St George City	24	(3)
- * Club domestic league appearances and goals as of 28 August 2026

Mason Tatafu (born 17 April 2002) is an Australian professional footballer who plays primarily as a Centre-back for St George City FC in the National Premier Leagues NSW.

== Career ==
Tatafu made his senior debut in July 2020 playing for Perth Glory NPL in National Premier Leagues Western Australia. He made his professional debut on 27 November 2020 against Ulsan Hyundai in the 2020 AFC Champions League. On 20 January 2021, he made his A-League debut, coming on as a substitute for the final few moments of a 5–3 win over Adelaide United.

In August 2021, Tatafu started college at Hofstra University and started playing for Hofstra Pride.

At Hofstra, Tatafu made 37 appearances over two seasons, scored four goals, and helped the team win back-to-back Colonial Athletic Association (CAA) championships in 2021 and 2022 — the program's first repeat titles since 2015 — while achieving their highest-ever NCAA RPI ranking at #8. He was named CAA Rookie of the Year, selected to the All-CAA Third Team, and ranked among the top 10 freshmen in the country by Top Drawer Soccer. In the 2022 offseason, he also played USL League Two with the Long Island Rough Riders, helping them reach their first USL2 National Final and being ranked as the #10 USL2 Top Prospect.

Tatafu transferred to the University of Louisville in August 2023, making 30 appearances and scoring twice. With Louisville, he reached the ACC semi-finals and the second round of the NCAA Tournament. In 2024, he joined Des Moines Menace in USL2, scoring once in seven appearances as they won their division and reached the divisional final.

=== Return to Australia ===
In June 2025, Tatafu returned to Australia, signing mid-season with Hume City FC in the National Premier Leagues Victoria. Primarily playing as a centre-back, he made seven appearances and scored one goal during the remainder of the season.

Later in 2025, Tatafu returned home to Perth, where he joined Bayswater City SC for the inaugural Australian Championship. He was named in Bayswater's squad for the competition wearing number 21. Tatafu appeared in all six of Bayswater's Australian Championship games.

=== St George City ===
In February 2026, Tatafu joined St George City FC for the 2026 National Premier Leagues NSW season and wore number 17. Tatafu made 24 appearances and scored 3 goals for St George City, across all competitions.

On the 30th of May, he scored the only goal in a 1-0 victory over St George FC in the St George derby

On the 14th of August, he scored the opening goal in a 2-0 away win against Sydney FC Youth.
