= Declan Hughes (soccer) =

English footballer

Personal information
- Date of birth: 27 May 2000 (age 26)
- Place of birth: Australia
- Position: Midfielder

Team information
- Current team: Bayswater City
- Number: 6

Youth career
- ECU Joondalup
- Perth Glory
- 2016: Bayswater City

Senior career*
Years	Team	Apps	(Gls)
2017–2018	ECU Joondalup	38	(0)
2018–2020	Ross County B		
2018–2020	→ Forres Mechanics (loan)		
2020	Bayswater City	14	(1)
2020	Perth Glory	0	(0)
2021–2024	Perth RedStar		
2025–	Bayswater City	6	(0)
- * Club domestic league appearances and goals as of 19:07, 19 December 2025 (UTC)

Declan Hughes (born 27 May 2000) is an Australian professional footballer who plays as a midfielder for Bayswater City. He made his professional debut on 18 November 2020 for Perth Glory against Shanghai Greenland Shenhua in the 2020 AFC Champions League.

== Career ==
Hughes started his career at ECU Joondalup. In 2016, he joined Perth Glory's academy.

In 2018, after trailing at Scottish club Ross County, Hughes signed with the club. He was on loan at Forres Mechanics in the 2019–20 season. On 25 May 2020, Hughes was released by Ross County.

In 2020, after getting released, he returned to Bayswater City; a club, he also played for as a youth player in 2016. In November 2020, following a trial period, Hughes was included in the Perth Glory squad for the 2020 AFC Champions League. The 20-year-old made four appearances as a substitute during the tournament.
