= Diego Celis =

Argentine footballer (born 1992)

Personal information
- Full name: Diego Adrián Celis
- Date of birth: 22 March 1992 (age 34)
- Place of birth: Buenos Aires, Argentina
- Height: 1.76 m (5 ft 9 in)
- Position: Forward

Team information
- Current team: Canberra Croatia

Youth career
- Vélez Sarsfield

Senior career*
Years	Team	Apps	(Gls)
2012–2013	Vélez Sarsfield	1	(0)
2013	Everton	0	(0)
2013	Chile Unido	–	(–)
2014	Argentino de Merlo	13	(7)
2015	Rangers	0	(0)
2015–2016	Hapoel Bnei Lod	31	(12)
2016–2017	Hapoel Ramat Gan	22	(11)
2017–2018	Hapoel Bnei Lod	28	(14)
2018–2019	Hapoel Iksal	30	(13)
2019	Bylis Ballsh	13	(5)
2020	San Marcos	17	(6)
2022–2023	APIA Leichhardt	34	(12)
2023	Rockdale Ilinden	8	(1)
2024	Argentino de Merlo	18	(1)
2026	Canberra Olympic	18	(9)
2026–	Canberra Croatia	0	(0)
- * Club domestic league appearances and goals as of 23 September 2026

Diego Adrián Celis (born 22 March 1992) is an Argentine-Chilean footballer who plays as a forward for Australian club Canberra Croatia.

== Career ==
A product of Vélez Sarsfield, Celis had stints with Everton de Viña del Mar and Rangers de Talca in Chile and Chile Unido in Sweden.

Making use of his dual citizenship, in 2020 he joined Chilean club San Marcos de Arica in the Primera B.

In 2022 he joined the Australian club APIA Leichhardt in the National Premier Leagues NSW. In June 2023, he switched to Rockdale Ilinden.

Back to Argentina, Celis joined Argentino de Merlo in June 2024.

On 21 September 2026, Celis joined Canberra Croatia from Canberra Olympic.

== Personal life ==
He holds Chilean citizenship.

== Career statistics ==
(correct as of 4 April 2017):

Statistics are attributed to the Israeli league only

Club	Season	League			State Cup			Toto Cup / Super Cup			Europe			Total		
Club	Season	Apps	Goals	Assists	Apps	Goals	Assists	Apps	Goals	Assists	Apps	Goals	Assists	Apps	Goals	Assists
Hapoel Bnei Lod	2015–16	31	13	10	1	1	0	0 / –	0 / –	0 / –	0	0	0	32	14	10
Hapoel Ramat Gan	2016–17	22	7	11	5	2	0	3 / –	0 / –	0 / –	0	0	0	40	9	11
Total		53	20	21	6	3	0	3 / –	0 / –	0 / –	0	0	0	72	23	21

== Honours ==
Vélez Sarsfield

- Primera División (1): 2012–13 Inicial
