= Jason Romero (soccer) =

American soccer player (born 1995)

Personal information
- Date of birth: 27 February 1995 (age 31)
- Place of birth: San Jose, California, United States
- Height: 1.83 m (6 ft 0 in)
- Position: Striker

Team information
- Current team: Preston Lions FC
- Number: 17

Youth career
- Mohave
- 2012–2014: De Anza Force

College career
Years	Team	Apps	(Gls)
2014	Yavapai Roughriders	23	(22)
2015	Pima Aztecs	23	(32)
2016	UCLA Bruins	11	(2)
2017	Portland Pilots	15	(3)

Senior career*
Years	Team	Apps	(Gls)
2016	Ventura County Fusion	4	(1)
2017	Myrtle Beach Mutiny	5	(1)
2018	FC Tucson	0	(0)
2018–2019	St George City	13	(13)
2019	Nyköping	12	(5)
2019	Umeå	13	(3)
2020–2021	St George City	24	(27)
2021–2023	APIA Leichhardt	24	(11)
2023	Macarthur FC	5	(1)
2023	APIA Leichhardt	14	(6)
2024	St George City	26	(4)
2024–2025	Nusantara United	10	(2)
2025–	Preston Lions FC	50	(8)
- * Club domestic league appearances and goals as of 16 August 2026

Jason Romero (born February 27, 1995) is an American professional soccer player who plays as a striker for NPL Victoria club Preston Lions FC.

== Early life ==
Romero was born in San Jose to Ignacio and Evangelina Romero where he grew up watching and playing soccer. He is the youngest of 3 children. He has 2 older brothers, Sergio and Brian. He attended Evergreen Valley High School and played for the school's soccer team, becoming their leading goalscorer in 2011.

== Club career ==
=== Youth and collegiate soccer ===
Romero started playing soccer at the De Anza Force youth academy. He committed to playing college soccer at the Yavapai College, where he went on to score 22 goals in 23 games. He continued this prolific form when he transferred to the Pima Community College for 2015, scoring 32 in 23. He transferred again for 2016, scoring twice in 11 games for the UCLA Bruins, before another transfer, this time to the Portland Pilots, where he scored three times in 15 appearances.

=== FC Tucson ===
On April 27, 2018, Romero signed with FC Tucson among 5 other new signings. Romero helped Tucson advance to the second round of the U.S. Open Cup scoring a goal in a 2–1 win over Máquina. Romero scored again in the second round but his side eventually lost 4–2 to Las Vegas Lights.

=== St George FC ===
Romero joined Australian club St George FC in 2018. He played in the NPL NSW 2 grand final where he scored a hattrick and eventually won the title on penalties against Mounties Wanderers.

=== Sweden ===
On January 24, 2019, Romero signed with Swedish club Nyköpings BIS. On April 8, 2019, He made his league debut against Gefle. Romero was the clubs top goalscorer before departing mid-season, scoring 5 goals in the league and two goals in the Swedish Cup.

On July 7, 2019, Romero signed with 1st Division rivals Umeå on a 1-year deal. He made his club debut as substitute in a 2–1 win against Vasalund, coming on in the 75th minute for Isaac Boye. On October 21, 2019, Romero scored his first goal for the club against Rynninge. On November 25, 2019, it was announced that Romero's contract was not to be extended and was allowed to leave the club as a free agent.

=== Return to Australia ===
On March 4, 2020, Romero signed with St George City as a marquee player ahead of the 2020 season. During his two years at the club, Romero helped his club go top of the league for the first time since getting promoted but due to COVID-19 the season was cancelled and no title was given.

On September 25, 2021, Romero signed with APIA Leichhardt after his impressive form with St George City. He remained prolific during the 2022 season, scoring a hat-trick against former NSL giant Sydney Olympic and helped his side defeat A-League club Western Sydney Wanderers in a 2–1 upset in the FFA Cup. At the end of the season, Romero was announced in the league's Team of the Year with APIA teammate Themba Muata-Marlow.

Romero was announced to play in the 2023 NPL NSW season for APIA. He started the season scoring 4 goals against South Sydney club Rockdale Ilinden in a 6–0 home win.

=== Macarthur FC ===
On February 24, 2023, Romero signed with Macarthur FC as an injury replacement for star player Ulises Dávila who was recovering from a knee injury. Romero made his professional club debut on March 5, being substituted on, in a 3-2 league win against Brisbane Roar. A week after starting his first game for the club, on March 19, he scored his first professional goal against Melbourne City at the 26th minute of the match. On May 18, a statement was released that Romero and five others were released by the club after their contracts expired. In total, he made 5 appearances for Macarthur and 1 goal.

=== Return to APIA ===
On June 21, 2023, APIA announced Romero re-signing during their mid-season transfer window.

=== Return to St George City ===
On January 31, 2024, it was announced that Romero had departed the Leichhardt club for a return to St George City under Mirko Jurilj.

=== Nusantara United ===
On 4 September 2024, Romero officially signed a contract with Indonesian club Nusantara United. He was brought in during the initial transfer window of the 2024–25 Liga 2 season.

== Career statistics ==
=== Club ===
As of match played March 10, 2023

Appearances and goals by club, season and competition
Club	Season	League			Cup (Note: Includes U.S. Open Cup, Swedish Cup and Australia Cup)		Continental		Other		Total	
Club	Season	Division	Apps	Goals	Apps	Goals	Apps	Goals	Apps	Goals	Apps	Goals
Ventura County Fusion	2016	USL PDL	4	1	0	0	—		0	0	4	1
Myrtle Beach Mutiny	2017	USL PDL	5	1	0	0	—		0	0	5	1
FC Tucson	2018	USL PDL	0	0	2 (Note: Appearances in the U.S. Open Cup)	2	—		0	0	2	2
St George FC	2018	NPL NSW 2	13	13	—		—		—		13	13
St George FC	Total		13	13	—		—		—		13	13
Nyköpings BIS	2019	Division 1	12	5	3	2	—		—		15	7
Nyköpings BIS	Total		12	5	3	2	—		—		15	7
Umeå	2019	Division 1	13	3	1	0	—		—		14	3
Umeå	Total		13	3	1	0	—		—		14	3
St George City	2020	NPL NSW 2	7	7	—		—		—		7	7
St George City	2021	NPL NSW 2	15	19	—		—		—		15	9
St George City	Total		22	26	—		—		—		22	26
APIA Leichhardt	2021	NPL NSW	0	0	3	2	—		—		3	2
APIA Leichhardt	2022	NPL NSW	24	11	1	0	—		—		25	11
APIA Leichhardt	2023	NPL NSW	3	4	—		—		—		3	4
APIA Leichhardt	Total		27	15	4	2	—		—		31	17
Career total			96	64	10	6	0	0	0	0	106	70

== Honors ==
St George FC

- NSW League One: 2018

Preston Lions FC

- Dockerty Cup: 2026

Individual

- ACCAC Player of the Year: 2015
- NPL NSW Men Team of the Year: 2022
