= Frank Drago Reserve =

Sports reserve in Bayswater, Western Australia

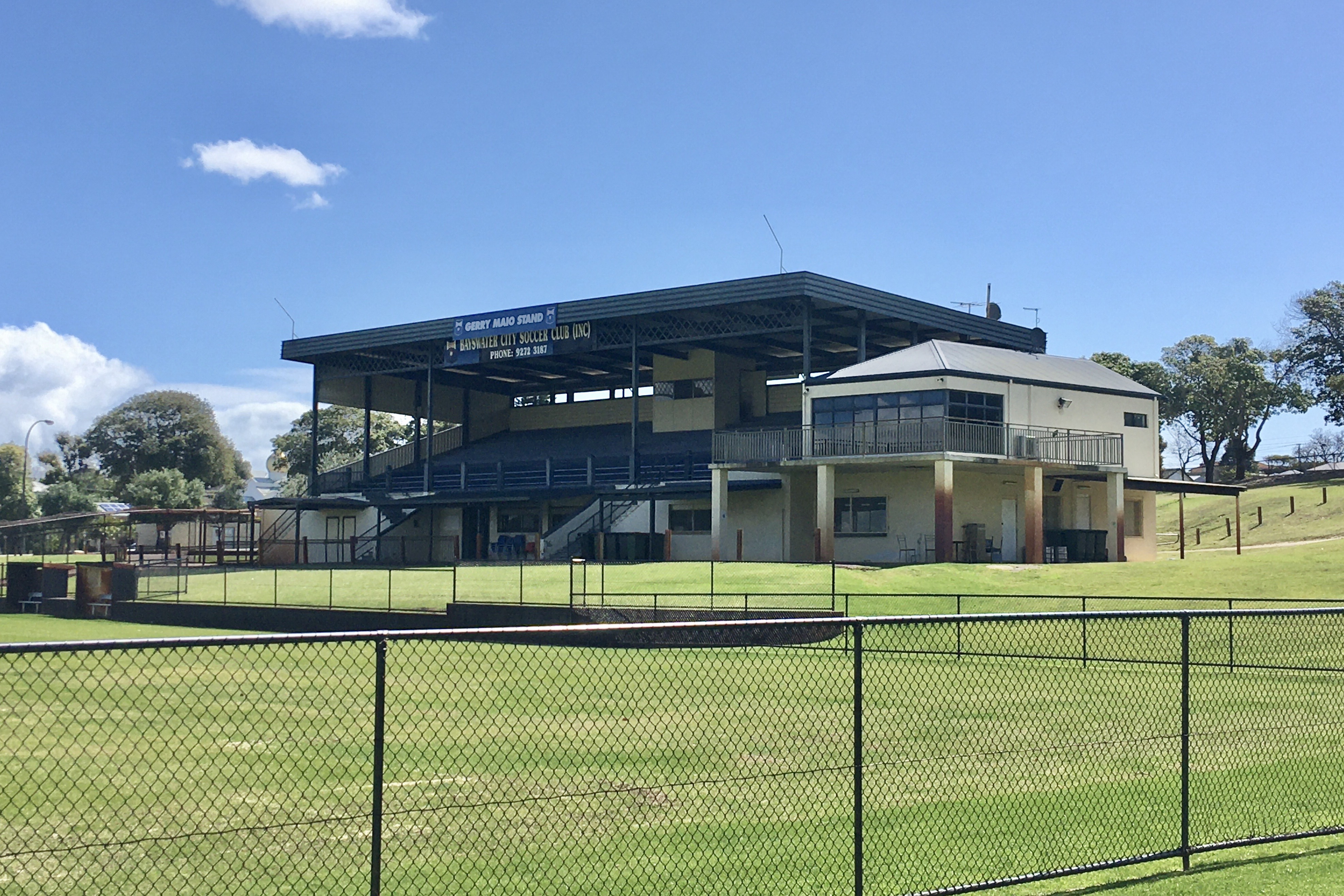
- Gerry Maio Stand in October 2021
- Interactive map of Frank Drago Reserve
- Former names: The recreation ground Bayswater Oval
- Address: Corner Whatley Crescent and Garratt Road, Bayswater, Western Australia; Australia
- Coordinates: 31.922°S 115.907°E
- Owner: Government of Western Australia
- Operator: City of Bayswater
- Type: Multipurpose sporting complex
- Current use: Soccer, tennis, croquet, bowls

Construction
- Opened: 22 February 1907

Frank Drago Reserve is a sports reserve in Bayswater, a suburb of Perth, Western Australia. It is home to the Bayswater City Soccer Club, Bayswater Bowls and Recreation Club, Bayswater Croquet Club and Bayswater Tennis Club.

== Clubs and facilities ==
Frank Drago Reserve is home to the Bayswater City Soccer Club, which competes in the National Premier Leagues Western Australia, Bayswater Bowls and Recreation Club, Bayswater Croquet Club and Bayswater Tennis Club.

Facilities for soccer are two main pitches, used for games, and two small pitches, used for training. The Gerry Maio stand overlooks these pitches. On the southern side of the reserve, on Murray Street, is the facilities for tennis, croquet and lawn bowls. The tennis club has clay courts, hard courts and grass courts, as well as a clubroom. All outdoors sports facilities have floodlighting.

The reserve is owned by the Government of Western Australia, but is managed by the City of Bayswater.

== History ==
In 1904, the land on and around the present day Frank Drago Reserve was purchased by Gold Estates of Australia Pty Ltd, a real estate company, for subdivision. The Bayswater Road Board (predecessor to the City of Bayswater) was looking at purchasing land for recreation and for a new hall, and Gold Estates wanted these facilities to be next to their land, so they sold part of the land to the road board at a low price, under the condition that those facilities were built within a certain timeframe. The ground was officially known as Bayswater Oval, but unofficially called "the rec" or "the recreation ground" by local residents. Prior to the 1950s, the Bayswater Oval was used for cricket and Australian rules football. On 22 February 1907, the recreation ground and hall was officially opened by James Brebber, the state's Minister for Works. The following day, 700 people attended the recreation ground for several sports being played.

During the early 1930s, the bowling and croquet clubs were formed. In 1932, several more lots were purchased from Gold Estates in order to expand the recreation ground.

In 1952, the Bayswater Road Board made the controversial decision to lease out the oval to the WA Soccer Association for use as its home ground. The ground was leased out so that some of the cost of maintaining the oval was recouped. Later that decade, a grandstand was purchased from Perth Oval, and was reconstructed at Bayswater.

Bayswater United moved to the ground in 1966, having played in Mount Hawthorn since being founded in 1961.

In 2000, Bayswater Oval was renamed to Frank Drago Reserve, after Francesco Maria Drago, long serving manager of the City of Bayswater's parks and gardens team.

In August 2021, the grandstand was renamed to the Gerry Maio Stand, after the soccer club's president, who had died earlier that month.
