= Nicholas Walsh (soccer) =

Australian soccer player

Personal information
- Full name: Nicholas Walsh
- Date of birth: 15 October 2002 (age 24)
- Place of birth: Australia
- Position: Defender

Team information
- Current team: Perth RedStar
- Number: 2

Youth career
- Sorrento FC
- 2016–2019: Perth Glory

Senior career*
Years	Team	Apps	(Gls)
2019–2021	Perth Glory NPL	19	(1)
2020–2021	Perth Glory	0	(0)
2021	Balcatta FC	14	(1)
2022–	Perth RedStar	48	(1)
- * Club domestic league appearances and goals as of 23 November 2023 ‡ National team caps and goals as of 25 November 2020

Nicholas Walsh (born 15 October 2002), is an Australian professional soccer player who plays as a defender for Perth RedStar. He made his professional debut on 25 November 2020 against Ulsan Hyundai in the 2020 AFC Champions League.
