= Bradley Cross (soccer) =

South African soccer player (born 2001)

Personal information
- Full name: Bradley Paul Cross
- Date of birth: 30 January 2001 (age 25)
- Place of birth: Kempton Park, Gauteng, South Africa
- Height: 1.75 m (5 ft 9 in)
- Position: Left-back

Team information
- Current team: Kaizer Chiefs
- Number: 48

Youth career
- Olympia Bedfordview
- –2018: Mpumalanga Black Aces
- 2018–2020: Bidvest Wits
- 2018–2020: → Schalke 04 (loan)
- 2020–2022: Newcastle United

Senior career*
Years	Team	Apps	(Gls)
2020–2022	Newcastle United	0	(0)
2023	Maritzburg United	16	(1)
2023–2024	Golden Arrows	21	(0)
2024–	Kaizer Chiefs	40	(0)

International career^{‡}
- South Africa U20
- South Africa U23
2023–	South Africa	1	(0)
- * Club domestic league appearances and goals as of 23 May 2026 ‡ National team caps and goals as of 29 May 2026

Bradley Paul Cross (born 30 January 2001) is a South African professional soccer player who plays as a left-back for Kaizer Chiefs and the South Africa national team.

== Early life ==
Cross was born on 30 January 2001 in Kempton Park, Gauteng, South Africa. He is of British descent through his father, Paul, who was born in the United Kingdom, and holds both a British passport and a South African passport. His twin sister is a policewoman living in the United Kingdom, while his older sister lives in Australia.

== Club career ==
Cross started his career with Mpumalanga Black Aces before joining Bidvest Wits. After spending time on loan with Schalke 04, he joined Premier League club Newcastle United on a two-year deal. He was released at the end of his contract. In November 2022, he joined Kaizer Chiefs on trial. In January 2023, he signed for Maritzburg United. In July 2023, Cross left Maritzburg United after relegation and joined Golden Arrows. On 3 September 2024, Cross joined Kaizer Chiefs on a four-year deal.

== International career ==
Cross has represented South Africa at under–20 level. He can also represent England at international level.

Cross was included in the South Africa national football team's 26-man squad for the 2026 FIFA World Cup, making his international debut for the country on 29 May 2026 against Nicaragua.

== Style of play ==
Cross describes himself as a "left-footed centre-back who likes to play out from the back."

== Personal life ==
Cross is White, being of British descent through his father, in contrast to the majority of his national team teammates who are Black or Coloured. He was the only White player in South Africa's 26-player squad for the 2026 FIFA World Cup in Canada, Mexico and the United States, a fact that has been discussed by political commentators due to the longstanding debate around the team's diversity regarding its low representation of non-Black players. At the tournament, he was questioned over United States President Donald Trump's controversial claims of a "white genocide" in South Africa, though before he could answer an official from the South African Football Association (SAFA) intervened and asked the reporter to not discuss politics.
