= Florent Indalecio =

French footballer (born 1997)

Personal information
- Full name: Florent Jose Indalecio
- Date of birth: 25 January 1997 (age 29)
- Place of birth: Rhone-Alpes, France
- Height: 1.87 m (6 ft 2 in)
- Position: Forward

Youth career
- Saint-Étienne

Senior career*
Years	Team	Apps	(Gls)
- Andrézieux-Bouthéon
- Saint-Chamond
- Hauts Lyonnais
2020	Fraser Park FC		
2020–2021	Newcastle United	0	(0)
2021	Morpeth Town	0	(0)
2022	Dandenong Thunder	6	(1)
2023	APIA Leichhardt	4	(0)
2025	Al-Ittifaq	4	(3)
- * Club domestic league appearances and goals as of 21:03, 1 March 2025 (UTC)

Florent Jose Indalecio (born 25 January 1997) is a French professional footballer who plays as a forward.

== Career ==
Born in Rhone-Alpes, Indalecio began his career with the youth team of Saint-Étienne, but was released by the club at the age of 15 due to poor behaviour. He then spent a number of unsuccessful trials at various clubs, including in the United States. A year later he was diagnosed with a tumour in his knee. He worked in a factory, whilst playing for amateur clubs Andrézieux-Bouthéon, Saint-Chamond and Hauts Lyonnais.

He then moved to Sydney, Australia, where he played with amateur team Fraser Park FC from January 2020, combining playing with a job working in construction, working as a bricklayer. He learned English whilst working on the construction sites. He made two competitive appearances for Fraser Park before the season ended due to COVID-19.

He moved to England in March 2020 to stay with Allan Saint-Maximin, a friend from Saint-Étienne. Following a trial with Newcastle United, he signed a short-term contract with the club in October 2020. Newcastle manager Steve Bruce said that Indalecio would initially play for the under-23 team, and had to "prove himself". Indalecio said he would repay the faith shown in him by Newcastle. Indalecio described it as his "second opportunity" in football. He was released by Newcastle at the end of the season.

After leaving Newcastle he signed for local non-league club Morpeth Town in October 2021, making two Cup appearances for them that month.

He returned to Australia in February 2022, signing for Dandenong Thunder. He moved to APIA Leichhardt for the 2023 season.

He signed for Emirati club Al-Ittifaq in January 2025.
