= Nicholas Olsen =

Australian soccer player

Personal information
- Full name: Nicholas John Olsen
- Date of birth: 26 September 1995 (age 31)
- Place of birth: Sydney, Australia
- Height: 1.75 m (5 ft 9 in)
- Position: Winger

Team information
- Current team: Wollongong Wolves

Youth career
- 2007–2012: Sutherland Sharks
- 2012–2015: Western Sydney Wanderers

Senior career*
Years	Team	Apps	(Gls)
2012–2014	Sutherland Sharks	32	(7)
2015–2016	APIA Leichhardt	47	(15)
2017	Sydney United 58	22	(2)
2018	Sutherland Sharks	11	(6)
2019–2020	Al-Jahra		(3)
2020–2021	Khaitan SC		(3)
2021–2022	Brisbane Roar	19	(0)
2022	Saigon	11	(5)
2023	SHB Da Nang	7	(0)
2023	Becamex Binh Duong	7	(0)
2024	Heidelberg United	27	(2)
2024	Maziya	0	(0)
2025	Wollongong Wolves	29	(12)
2026	Sutherland Sharks	31	(11)
2026–	Wollongong Wolves	0	(0)

International career^{‡}
2013	Australia U20	2	(1)
- * Club domestic league appearances and goals as of 17 September 2026 ‡ National team caps and goals as of 22 November 2021

Nicholas Olsen (born 26 September 1995) is an Australian professional soccer player who plays as a winger for Wollongong Wolves in the Australian Championship.

== Early life ==
Olsen was born on 26 September 1995 in Sydney, Australia. He was raised in Perth and returned to Sydney in Hurstville, New South Wales at the age of eight. Olsen began his football career at Sutherland Sharks in their under-13 squad, before moving to Western Sydney Wanderers in 2012. He briefly trained in both club's first-team squads, including under Tony Popovic where he trained full-time. He soon joined APIA Leichhardt in 2015, following his release from the Wanderers that same year.

== Club career ==
=== Saigon FC ===
In August 2022, Olsen joined V.League 1 side Saigon. He scored 5 goals in 11 appearances for the club before sitting out the remaining two matched of the 2022 V.League 1 season due to a wage dispute.

=== SHB Danang ===
Following the conclusion of the 2022 V.League 1 season, Olsen signed with SHB Danang.

=== Becamex Binh Duong ===
On 19 June 2023, Olsen joined Becamex Binh Duong for the remainder of the 2023 season. He was given the number 28 jersey.

=== Heidelberg United ===
After his stint in Vietnam, Olsen returned to Australia having signed for Heidelberg United in the NPL Victoria for the 2024 season. He made 27 appearances and scored 2 goals for the club.

=== Maziya ===
In September 2024, Olsen headed abroad once more having signed for Dhivehi Premier League club Maziya.
