= St George City FC =

Soccer club based in Sydney, New South Wales

- Founded: 2015 (11 years ago)
- Ground: Penshurst Park; Penshurst, New South Wales
- Capacity: 1,000
- Owner: St George Football Association
- League: NPL NSW
- 2025: 9th of 16
- Website: stgeorgecity.com.au

St George City FC is a semi-professional soccer club association football club based in Penshurst, New South Wales. Their senior men's team currently competes in the National Premier Leagues NSW (NPL), in the second tier of the Australian league system. It plays its home games at the 1,000-capacity Penshurst Park. Owned and operated by the St George Football Association (SGFA), the club was founded in 2015 as the institution's representative side in Football NSW competitions. Upon entry in the 2017 season, it quickly rose through the tiers, securing promotions to NSW League One in 2018, and the NPL in 2022.

== Senior Team History ==
Founded in late 2015, St George City was created with the aim of providing a new way for players aged 13 to 16 to progress into senior football from their SAP program. The club's ultimate goal was to obtain a Football NSW National Premier League (NPL) Youth License, which required the presence of a senior team in the National Premier Leagues system. This would enable the youth team to participate in the NPL youth system. At the start of 2016, St George City was set to play in NSW State League under former NSL player, Manny Spanoudakis. The same year, they finished the league as Premiers and Championship winners, defeating Hurstville ZFC in the grand final on penalties. This earned them promotion, on their debut season, to NPL NSW 3.

In their first season in NPL NSW 3, St George City finished third in the division behind Fraser Park FC and Rydalmere Lions FC before ending their season, being knocked out, by the eventual winners Fraser Park in the semi-final. The 2018 season saw St George City winning the premiership, and earning promotion with 5 points ahead of runners-up, Hawkesbury City FC. This lead them to a earning the double beating SD Raiders 2-0 to win the championship.

They also signed former A-League Men player Corey Gameiro and Nick Sullivan to their squad who both departed by the end of the season. During the 2019 season, St George City played their first derby match at home against St George FC, with the score ending in a 1-1 draw. At the conclusion of the season, St George finished 11th and for the first time in the club history not qualify to a final's series.

It wasn't until 2022, when St George City finally earned promotion to NPL NSW Men's division after coming runners-up and beating premiership winners, Central Coast Mariners Academy, 2-1, in extra time after a late goal from Damian German to win them the championship.

== Club colours ==
The club colours are red and white. The club's home kit is a red shirt, with white shorts and red socks with their kit sponsor being Joga Sportswear.

== Stadium ==
After its establishment in 2016, St George City primarily played in Peter Moore Field in Bankstown during the 2016 season in NSW State league. The club then shared a field with Fraser Park FC before moving to and playing in Jubilee Stadium for two years.

St George City moved to the newly re-developed Penshurst Park which is based in Penshurst in the St George area. The redevelopment reportedly cost up to $17 million and adds new facilities to the sporting complex including an increase of 265 seating capacity. Further development was planned prior to 2022, adding new synthetic fields and improved facilities to the complex.

== Current squad ==
As of 28 March, 2026 Note: Flags indicate national team as defined under FIFA eligibility rules; some limited exceptions apply. Players may hold more than one non-FIFA nationality.

No.	Pos.	Nation	Player
1	GK	AUS	Jack Kenny
2	DF	AUS	Matthew Wahby
3	DF	AUS	Ben Berry
4	DF	AUS	Solomon-Johnn Monahan-Vaiika
5	DF	AUS	Lewis Miccio
6	DF	AUS	Tarik Ercan (Captain)
7	FW	TUR	Oscar Gültekin
8	MF	AUS	Stefano Rossello
9	MF	AUS	Brae Ovens
10	MF	AUS	Paolo Mitry
12	GK	AUS	Franklin Jan
13	GK	AUS	Cameron Kemp
15	FW	JPN	Jorn Pedersen
17	MF	AUS	Josh Keremelevski
18	FW	POR	Gonçalo Agrelos

No.	Pos.	Nation	Player
19	DF	AUS	Mason Tatafu
20	DF	AUS	Theph Theph
21	GK	AUS	Kaisem Mahdi
23	MF	JPN	Hiroto Domoto
24	FW	AUS	Zachary Hammoud
25	DF	AUS	Brodie Clarkson
27	FW	AUS	Matthew Jackson
33	FW	LBN	Louis Khoury
35	MF	PHI	Spencer Webster
36	MF	AUS	Toby Tindale
40	FW	AUS	John Stamos
41	GK	AUS	Stavros Skotadis
43	MF	AUS	Peter Dendrinos
44	MF	AUS	Hugo McAteer

== Honours ==
- NPL 2/NSW League One Champions 2022
- NPL 3/NSW League Two Premiers 2018
- NPL 3/NSW League Two Champions 2018
- NSW State League Premiers 2016
- NSW State League Champions 2018
