= Christie Park (Sydney, Australia) =

Sports ground in the Lower North Shore, Sydney, Australia

Coordinates: 33°46′15″S 151°7′8″E

Christie Park is a sportsground located in the Northern Suburbs Sydney suburb of Macquarie Park. Christie Park is the home to Football NSW team Gladesville Ryde Magic FC, who share the ground with another Football NSW team, NWS Spirit FC.

The park is owned by Ryde Council and leased to North West Sydney Football (formerly GHFA). The ground is used for semi-professional competitions such as NPL and WNPL. It is also used for the amateur men's & women's competition run by NWSF.

Christie Park is also the home of the local refereeing association the North West Sydney Football Referees Association (NWSFRA).
