= Manningham United Blues FC =

Association football club in Templestowe, Victoria, Australia

Manningham United
- Full name: Manningham United Football Club
- Nickname: United
- Founded: 1999; 27 years ago (as "Manningham Juniors Soccer Club")
- Ground: Pettys Reserve
- Capacity: 1,500
- President: Nick Raptopoulos
- Manager: George Karkaletsis
- League: Victoria Premier League 1
- 2025: 11th of 14
- Website: www.manninghamunitedfc.com
Home colours	Away colours

Manningham United Blues Football Club is an Australian soccer club from Templestowe, a suburb of Melbourne, Victoria. The club competes in Victoria Premier League 1. The club was formed in 1999 by local residents and was known as Manningham Juniors Soccer Club.

In 2010, Manningham Juniors Soccer Club obtained a Senior Men's license from Fawkner SC. Manningham United plays their senior games at Pettys Reserve.

== History ==
In 1999, the club, originally known as Manningham Juniors Soccer Club, had just three junior teams, with a committee led by Paul Martinello and Tari Mallia.

=== Fawkner-Whittlesea Blues ===
In 2004 Fawkner Blues merged with Whittlesea Stallions to form Fawkner-Whittlesea Blues. Their home games were played at Whittlesea's home stadium Epping Stadium. The merge only lasted until 2006. The club played in the 2005 and 2006 Victorian Premier League. In 2005 they finished fourth but only six points from first. The following year, the final year before Fawkner-Whittlesea dissolved, it finished 10th. At the end of 2006, Fawkner opted to go back to being a stand-alone club and Whittlesea forming a partnership with Bulleen Lions to form the Whittlesea Zebras, who have been known as Moreland Zebras FC since 2011.

In 2013, Manningham were playing in the Victorian State League 5 and had finished 5th. Fawkner on the other hand playing in State League 1 would finish dead last, below Eastern Lions by 6 points.

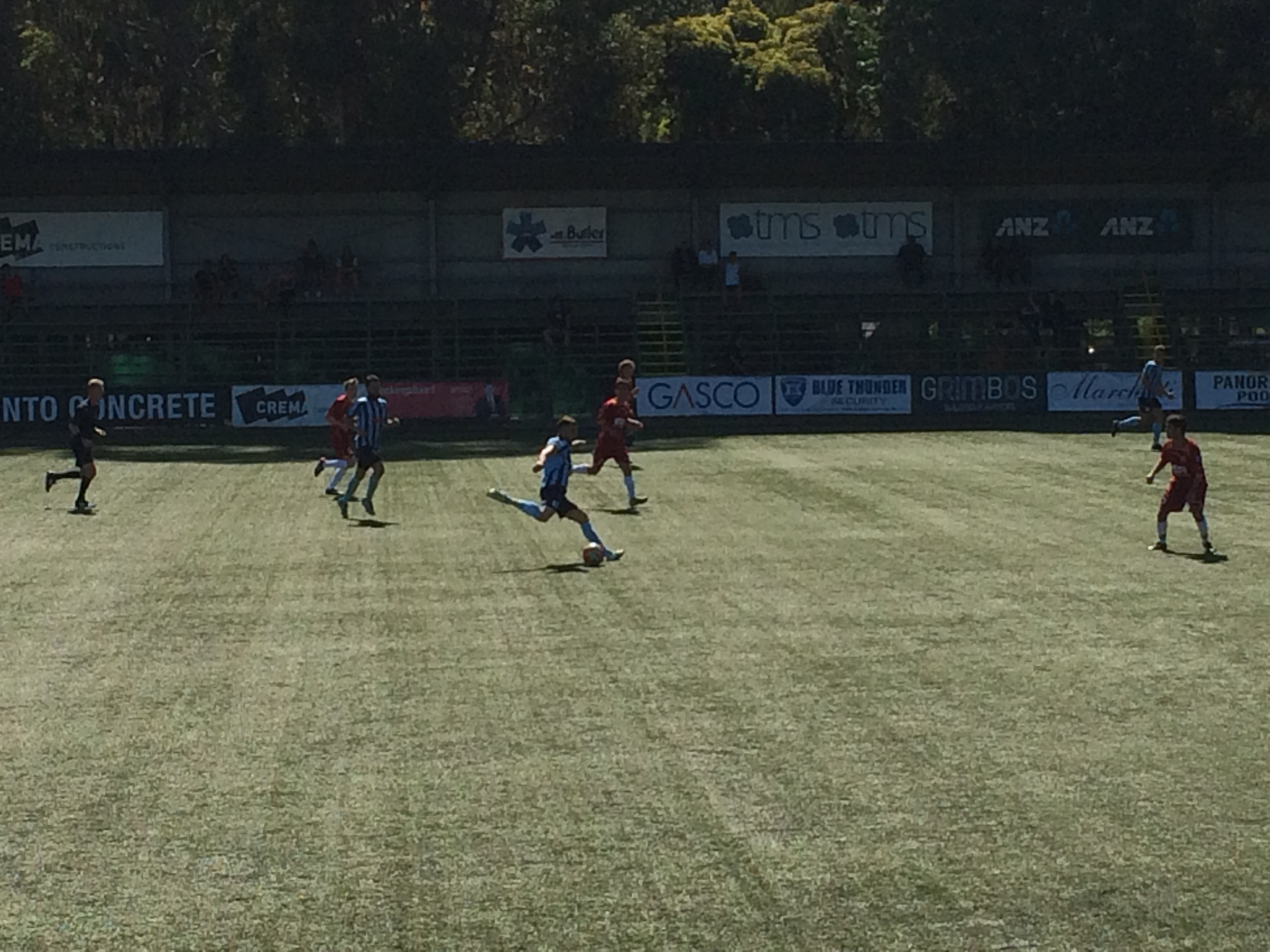
Manningham United player taking a shot against Bulleen Lions in a friendly

The season before the merger, Manningham had just escaped the bottom of the ladder finishing above Brandon Park who only managed one win in the entire season. Manningham ended the season on 19 points with 6 wins and 1 draw. In the 2014 season Fawkner finished 3rd behind Preston Lions and Moreland City.

=== Manningham United Blues ===
On 27 November 2014 it was announced that Manningham United, a then Victorian State League 4 team would merge with Fawkner Blues, a State League 1 team, and Manningham United Blues Football Club was born. In 2014 they fielded 30 junior teams and have grown to be the biggest community club in Manningham. They moved from CB Smith Reserve which Fawkner SC now plays at to play at Mannigham's ground Timberidge or alternatively Wilson Road Reserve. In its inaugural season Manningham finished a disappointing 10th. In 2016, it finished in fifth.

In the first season of the merger, Manningham United Blues would finish 10th.

Manningham's seniors had a relatively slow start to the season with only two wins in the first five matches. however form hit when they won six matches in a row from round 7–12 and were only stopped by eventual winners Mornington SC. It looked at that point even though there was a loss to Mornington there was still a good chance of a high place finish or even the title. However, with one win in the last five matches including a 3–3 draw to bottom side Frankston Pines FC a fifth-place finish would ultimately be disappointing for Manningham.

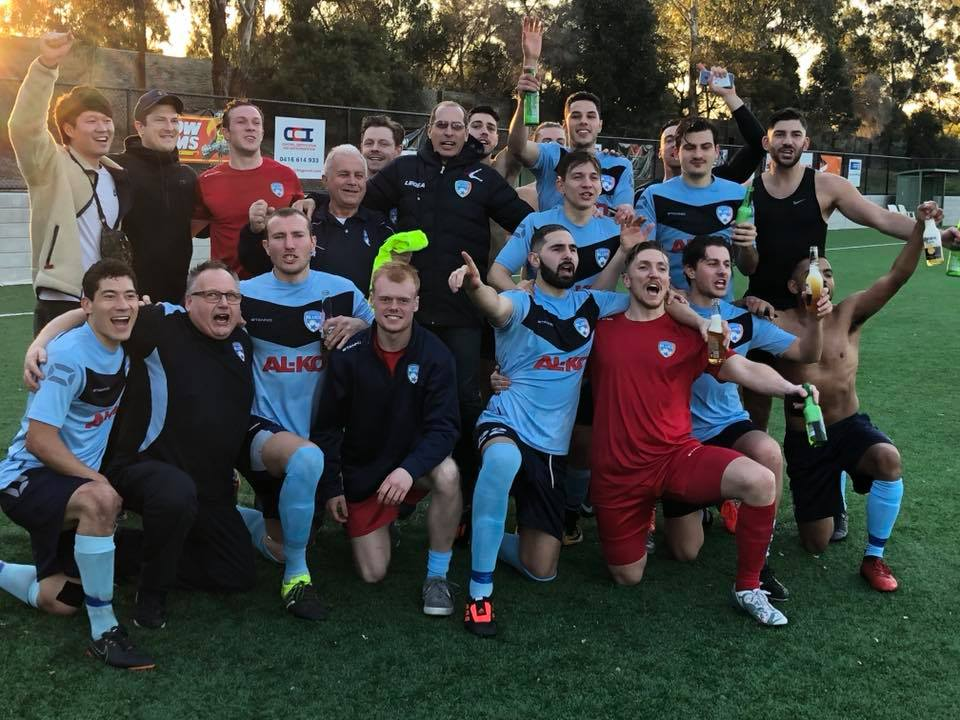
Manningham United celebrate promotion in 2018

In 2018, Manningham achieved promotion from State League 1 to the National Premier Leagues Victoria 2 with a league championship. Dean Lorenzi finished as the club's and league's top goalscorer with 21 goals.

=== National Premier Leagues Victoria ===
Manningham United reached an agreement with the Veneto Club in Bulleen, Victoria to play its senior home games for the 2019 season.

== Club name and logo ==
=== Logo ===
Fawkner's original logo has not been touched except for their brief merge with Whittlesea Stallions in 2004 which would eventually end in 2006. After Fawkner-Whittlesea Blues dissolved Fawkner changed back to their original logo. When they would eventually merge with Manningham it would stay relatively the same, however that cannot be said for Manningham.

Manningham started off in 1999 with a soccer ball as the foundation of their logo with blue pentagons and blue and white stripes on it. In 2011 a name change and a new logo as well the ball still featured heavily. But instead of blue and white it would be blue and black to match their new colours. This new logo would only last three years because in 2014 Manningham and Fawkner would merge and the logo stayed relatively the same, and it so happened that a soccer ball once again featured heavily on the logo.

However, in 2024 the club decided to change their logo with a more modern approach. The soccer ball stayed on the design but the font and colors were changed. This matched their kit well and is the current logo for Manningham.

Fawkner Blues Original Logo

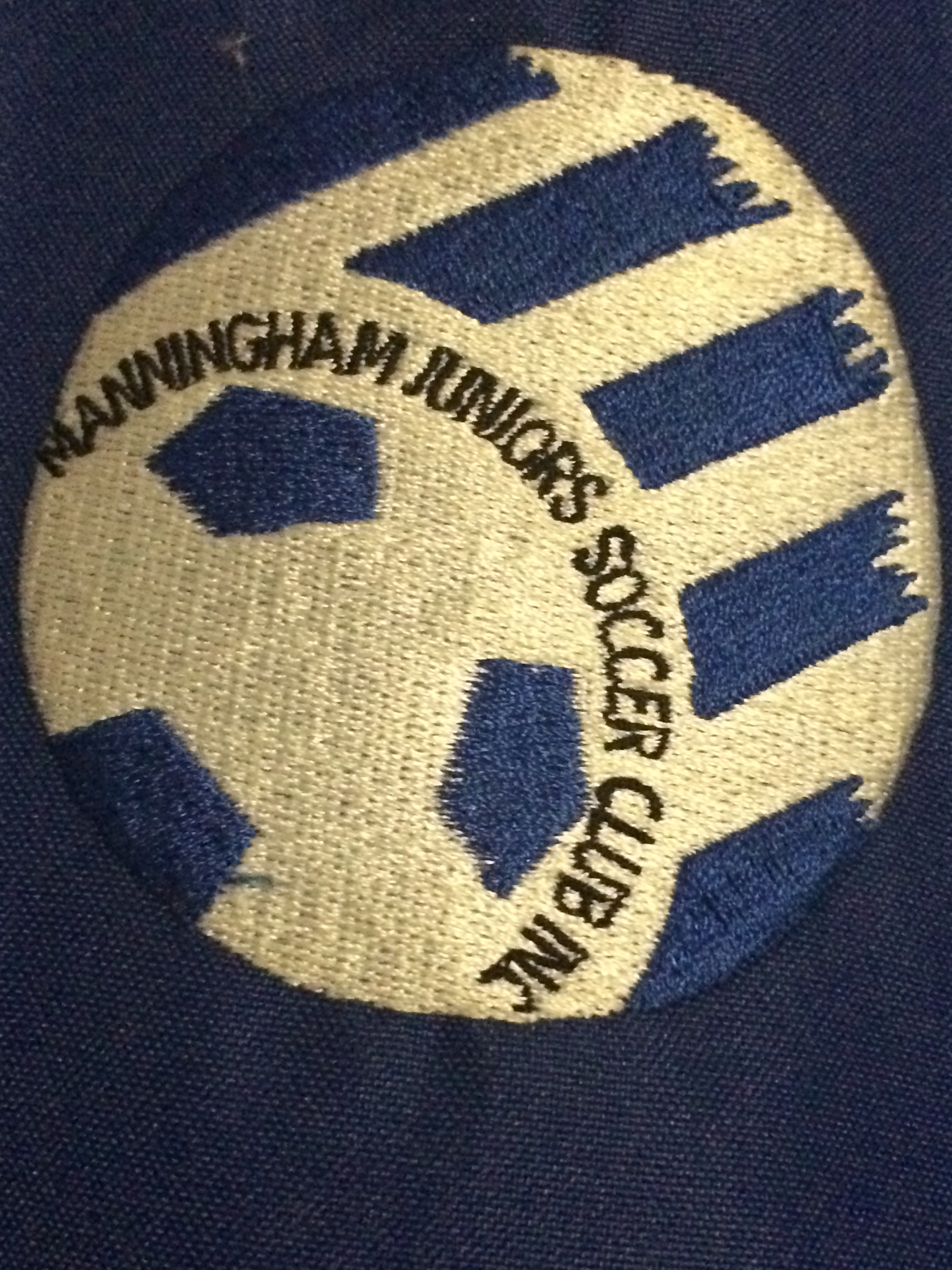
Manningham Junior Soccer Club Logo 1999–2010

Manningham United Logo 2011–2014

Manningham United Blues Logo 2015–2023

=== Name ===
The club that is now Manningham United Blues originally was founded in 1965 under the name Fawkner however in 1994 they changed their club name to Fawkner Blues, with a brief change to Fawkner-Whittlesea Blues after a merge with Whittlesea in 2004 which ended in 2006.

merge with Manningham United in 2014 as Manningham adopted the blues to become Manningham United Blues. Manningham have also had several name changes. Beginning as Manningham Junior Soccer Club in 1999

the club swapped out the soccer for a more traditional football. The name and logo lasted only three years after a merge with Fawkner in 2014 and they adopted part of their name and majority of their badge.

== Kit provider and sponsor ==
Period	Kit Provider	Shirt Sponsor
2008	(Australia) Covo	
2009	(Australia) Covo	
2010	(Australia) Covo	
2011	(United States) Nike	
2012	(United States) Nike	
2013	(United States) Nike	
2014	(United States) Nike	Janev Building & Painting
2015	(Italy) Legea	United Petroleum
2016	(Italy) Stanno	AL-KO
2017	(Italy) Stanno	AL-KO
2018	(Italy) Stanno	AL-KO
2019	(Italy) Stanno	AL-KO
2020	(Australia) Konqa	AUSREO Specialised Fire Protection
2021	(Australia) Konqa	AUSREO Specialised Fire Protection
2022	(Australia) Armadura	AUSREO Specialised Fire Protection
2023	(Australia) Armadura	Bendigo Bank
2024	(United Kingdom) Umbro	Bendigo Bank
2025	(United Kingdom) Umbro	Prostone Group
2026	(United Kingdom) Umbro	Catalano Interiors

== FFA/Australia Cup Record ==
=== Overall ===
Competition	Pld	W	D	L	GF	GA	GD
FFA Cup	19	11	0	8	69	36	+21

=== Matches ===
Season	Competition	Round	Club	Score	Win/Loss
2014	FFA Cup	1P	Manningham vs Brimbank Stallions FC	2–**1**(AET)	Loss
2014	FFA Cup	4P	Fawkner Blues vs Eltham Redbacks	**4**–2	Win
2014	FFA Cup	5P	Fawkner Blues vs Beaumaris	**1**–0	Win
2014	FFA Cup	6P	Fawkner Blues vs South Springvale	**0**–1	Loss
2015	FFA Cup	3P	Heatherton United SC	**1**–0	Win
2015	FFA Cup	4P	North Geelong Warriors FC	6–**1**	Loss
2016	FFA Cup	3P	Sydenham Park SC	2–**3**	Win
2016	FFA Cup	4P	Oakleigh Cannons FC	**0**–5	Loss
2017	FFA Cup	3P	Mazenod United FC	**3**–1	Win
2017	FFA Cup	4P	FC Bulleen Lions	4–**1**	Loss
2018	FFA Cup	3P	Tatura	**13**–0	Win
2018	FFA Cup	4P	Mooroolbark	**6**–2	Win
2018	FFA Cup	5P	Kingston City FC	3–**1**	Loss
2019	FFA Cup	4P	Fitzroy City SC	2–**1**	Loss
2020	FFA Cup	3P	Greenvale United SC	**8**–0	Win
2020	FFA Cup	4P	**Cancelled due to COVID-19**		
2021	FFA Cup	3P	Brandon Park SC	**5**–2	Win
2021	FFA Cup	4P	Doncaster Rovers SC	**6**–0	Win
2021	FFA Cup	5P	Port Melbourne SC	**0**–1	Loss
2022	Australia Cup	4P	Keilor Park SC	**5**-0	Win
2022	Australia Cup	5P	Port Melbourne SC	**0**–4	Loss

=== Records ===
Biggest Win

Manningham United 13–0 Tatura SC

BIggest Defeat

North Geelong Warriors FC 6–1 Manningham United FC

Manningham United FC 0–5 Oakleigh Cannons FC

Best Result

Sixth Round Preliminary, 2014

Top Goalscorer

Billy Romas: (4)

Most Appearances

David Lorenzi (9)

Notes:

Manningham's score is always in bold: Preliminary Round

== Dockerty Cup Record ==
From 2014 onwards, the Dockerty Cup is also a qualifying completion for the FFA Cup.

=== Overall ===
Competition	Pld	W	D	L	GF	GA	GD
Dockerty Cup	61	31	5	25	115	105	+10

=== Matches ===
Season	Competition	Round	Club	Score	Win/Loss
1972	Dockerty Cup	AFL1	Geelong SC	**2**–6	Loss
1973	Dockerty Cup	PR	Melton	**1**–3	Loss
1974	Dockerty Cup	PL2	Frankston Pines FC	**0**–3	Loss
1975–78	Results Not Available				
1979	Dockerty Cup	P2	Ballarat	1–**3**(AET)	Win
1979	Dockerty Cup	P3	Frankston Pines FC	2–**0**	Loss
1980	Dockerty Cup	P1	Morwell Falcons	**2**–4	Loss
1981	Dockerty Cup	P2	Dandenong City SC	**4**–0	Win
1981	Dockerty Cup	R1	Prahan	1–**1**†	Loss
1982	Dockerty Cup	P1	Morwell Falcons	**1**–2	Loss
1983	Dockerty Cup	R1	Western Suburbs SC	**3**–0	Win
1983	Dockerty Cup	QF	Box Hill United SC	3–**1**	Loss
1984	Dockerty Cup	R1	North Dandenong	**1**–0	Win
1984	Dockerty Cup	R2	Karingal United	0–**6**	Win
1984	Dockerty Cup	QF	St Albans	**2**–1	Win
1984	Dockerty Cup	SF	Western Suburbs SC	**4**–1	Win
1984	Dockerty Cup	F	Maribyrnong Polonia	2–**3**	Champions
1985	Dockerty Cup	R1	Holland Park	**2**–2†	Win
1985	Dockerty Cup	R2	Croydon City	**2**–3	Loss
1986	Dockerty Cup	R1	Broadmeadows City	**1**–0	Win
1986	Dockerty Cup	R2	North Dandenong	**0**–0†	Win
1986	Dockerty Cup	R3	Brunswick Juventus	0–**1**	Win
1986	Dockerty Cup	QF	Green Gully SC	**0**–5	Loss
1987	Dockerty Cup	R1	Doveton SC	**5**–1	Win
1987	Dockerty Cup	R2	Northcote City FC	2–**3**	Win
1987	Dockerty Cup	R3	Brunswick Juventus	7–**0**	Loss
1988	Dockerty Cup	R1	Lalor United	**4**–0	Win
1988	Dockerty Cup	R2	Maribyrnong Polonia	**1**–4	Loss
1989	Dockerty Cup	R1	Brighton	**0**–1	Loss
1990–92	Results Not Available				
1993	Dockerty Cup	R1	Springvale United	**7**–1	Win
1993	Dockerty Cup	R2	Doncaster Rovers S.C.	0–**2**	Win
1993	Dockerty Cup	R3	Broadmeadows City	**2**–3	Loss
1994	Dockerty Cup	R1	Fitzroy City SC	**3**–1	Win
1994	Dockerty Cup	R2	Werribee City FC	**3**–1	Win
1994	Dockerty Cup	R3	Thomastown Devils	1–**2**	Win
1994	Dockerty Cup	R4	FC Bulleen Lions	**0**–0†	Loss
1995	Dockerty Cup	Group Eight	Waverly City	**4**–1	Win
1995	Dockerty Cup	Group Eight	Seaford United	0–**3**	Win
1995	Dockerty Cup	Group Eight	Brunswick City SC	0–**4**	Win
1995	Dockerty Cup	R2	Bentleigh Greens SC	**2**–2†	Loss
1996	Dockerty Cup	Group Ten	East Richmond	1–**0**	Loss
1996	Dockerty Cup	Group Ten	Endeavour Hills	**w/o**	Win
1996	Dockerty Cup	Group Ten	Stonnington City	**2**–3	Loss
1997–2003	Not Played				
2004	Crazy John's Cup	R5	Western Suburbs SC	1–**2**	Win
2004	Crazy John's Cup	R6	Heidelberg United FC	1–**2**	Win
2004	Crazy John's Cup	QF	Northcote City FC	**2**–1	Win
2004	Crazy John's Cup	SF	St Albans	0–**6**	Win
2004	Crazy John's Cup	F	Green Gully SC	**0**–1	Runners Up
2005–2010	Not Played				
2011	Mirabella Cup	R4	Moreland City	3–**2**	Loss
2012	FFV State Knockout Cup	R1	Old Trinity Grammarians	3–**0**	Loss
2013	FFV State Knockout Cup	R2	Moreland City vs Fawkner Blues	3–**0**	Loss
2013	FFV State Knockout Cup	R2	Old Carey vs Manningham	3–**1**	Loss
2014	Dockerty Cup	R1	Brimbank Stallions FC vs Manningham	2–**1**(AET)	Loss
2014	Dockerty Cup	R4	Fawkner Blues vs Eltham Redbacks	**4**–2	Win
2014	Dockerty Cup	R5	Fawkner Blues vs Beaumaris	**1**–0	Win
2014	Dockerty Cup	R6	Fawkner Blues vs South Springvale	**0**–1	Loss
2015	Dockerty Cup	R1	Heatherton United SC	**1**–0	Win
2015	Dockerty Cup	R2	Oakleigh Cannons FC	**0**–5	Loss
2016	Dockerty Cup	R3	Sydenham Park SC	2–**3**	Win
2016	Dockerty Cup	R4	Oakleigh Cannons FC	**0**–5	Loss
2017	Dockerty Cup	R3	Mazenod United FC	**3**–1	Win
2017	Dockerty Cup	R4	FC Bulleen Lions	4–**1**	Loss

=== Records ===
Biggest Win

Karingal United 0–6 Fawkner (14 October 1984)

Fawkner 7–1 Springvale United (27 February 1993)

St Albans 0–6 Fawkner Blues (31 August 2004)

Biggest Defeat

Brunswick Juventus 7–0 Fawkner (17 October 1987)

Notes

Manninham's score is always in bold

AFL1: Affiliated Leagues Round One

PR: Provisional League Preliminary Round

PL2: Provisional League Second Round

P1: First Preliminary Round

P2: Second Preliminary Round

P3: Third Preliminary Round

R: Round

QF: Quarter Final

SF: Semi Final

F: Final

AET: After Extra Time

†: Match Went to Penalties

Ref:

== State knockout cup ==
The State knockout cup also known as the previously known as the "Team App Cup" now known as the "Nike F.C. Cup" is an annual women's cup which was introduced in 2012 under the name Women's State Knockout Cup, Manningham first competed in 2017 entering in the qualifying round.

=== Overall ===
Competition	Pld	W	D	L	GF	GA	GD
State knockout cup	1	0	0	1	1	2	−1

=== Matches ===
Season	Competition	Round	Team	Score	Win/Loss
2017	Team App Cup	QR	Ringwood City	**1**–2	Loss
2018	Did not enter				
2019	Did not enter				
2020	Did not enter				

Notes

Manninham's score is always in bold

QR: Qualifying Round

== Competition timeline ==
As Fawkner
League											Finals	Dockerty Cup	FFA Cup	Top Goalscorer	
Season	Division	Pld	W	D	L	GF	GA	GD	Pts	Position	Finals	Dockerty Cup	FFA Cup	Player/s	Goals
1970	Victorian District Premier League	22	9	2	11	45	37	+8	20	8th					
1971	Victorian District Premier League	22	14	3	5	49	30	+19	31	3rd					
1972	Victorian Provisional League	20	9	4	7	33	25	+8	22	5th		AFL1			
1973	Victorian Provisional League	22	14	6	2	52	22	+31	34	2nd		PR			
1974	Victorian Provisional League	22	14	4	4	62	28	+34	32	3rd		PL2			
1975	Victorian Provisional League	22	17	2	3	70	37	+33	36	2nd					
1976	Victorian Provisional League	22	14	3	5	45	23	+22	31	3rd					
1977	Victorian Provisional League Division 1	22	14	5	3	66	31	+35	33	2nd					
1978	Victorian Metropolitan League Division 4	22	18	3	1	81	16	+65	39	1st					
1979	Victorian Metropolitan League Division 3	22	12	4	6	46	27	+19	28	3rd		P3			
1980	Victorian Metropolitan League Division 3	22	13	6	3	51	26	+25	32	2nd		P1		Frank Fragale	14*
1981	Victorian Metropolitan League Division 2	22	12	7	3	51	26	+25	31	1st		R1		Bruno Sabidussi	14
1982	Victorian Metropolitan League Division 1	26	22	2	2	73	27	+46	46	1st		P1		Emilio Anselma	16
1983	Victorian State League	26	10	5	11	38	50	−12	25	8th		QF		Bruno Cozzella	10
1984	Victorian State League	26	15	6	5	61	35	+26	36	3rd		Champions		Bruno Cozzella Ian Tuffield	15
1985	Victorian State League	26	9	7	10	41	36	+5	25	7th		R2		Bruno Cozzella	10
1986	Victorian State League	26	12	6	8	28	24	+4	30	6th		QF		Bruno Cozzella	10
1987	Victorian State League	28	16	6	6	45	24	+21	38	3rd		R3		Doug Brown	14
1988	Victorian State League	30	9	6	15	28	35	−7	24	14th		R2		Doug Brown	8
1989	Victorian State League	30	8	5	17	28	47	+19	21	14th		R1		David Hanna	8
1990	Victorian State League	34	16	8	10	53	19	+34	40	5th				David Hanna	9
1991	Victorian Premier League	26	10	9	7	33	30	+3	29	6th				David Hanna	10
1992	Victorian Premier League	26	13	5	8	30	27	+3	31	5th	Minor Semi-Final			Danny Gnjidic	10
1993	Victorian Premier League	26	14	5	7	49	31	+18	33	2nd	Runners Up	R1		Carlos Retre	23
1994	Victorian Premier League	26	4	13	9	25	37	−12	21	9th		R4		Carlos Retre	6
1995	Victorian Premier League	26	9	5	12	25	35	−10	32	8th		R2		Danny Gnjidic	9
1996	Victorian Premier League	26	4	7	15	24	49	−25	19	13th		Group Stage		Marco di Sauro, Tony Ujgunovski	4
1997	Victorian Premier League	26	6	9	11	37	47	−10	27	12th				Peter Psarros	10
1998	Victorian Premier League	26	12	7	7	40	28	+12	43	6th				Santo Emmanuele	17
1999	Victorian Premier League	26	14	4	8	48	33	+15	46	4th				Santo Emmanuele	11
2000	Victorian Premier League	22	6	9	7	28	27	+1	27	7th				Peter Psarros	13
2001	Victorian Premier League	22	8	8	6	36	22	+14	32	6th				Santo Emmanuele	7
2002	Victorian Premier League	22	11	8	3	38	21	+17	41	1st	Runners Up			Henry Fa'arodo	8
2003	Victorian Premier League	22	9	4	9	31	35	−4	31	8th				Chimaobi Nwaogazi	8
2004	Victorian Premier League	22	6	5	11	34	29	+5	23	9th		Runners Up		Tony Sterjovski, Mark Tsiorlas	6
2005	Fawkner-Whittlesea Blues														
2006	Fawkner-Whittlesea Blues														
2007	Victorian Premier League	26	9	6	11	26	28	−2	33	11th				Mark Tsiorlas	9
2008	Victorian Premier League	26	6	3	17	22	59	−37	21	13th				Joey Youssef	6
2009	Victorian State League Division 1	22	10	5	7	33	27	+6	35	5th				Robert Dolevski	7
2010	Victorian State League Division 1	26	11	5	6	36	26	+7	28	3rd				Robert Dolevski Ridvan Saglam	12
2011	Victorian State League Division 1	22	6	3	13	21	27	−6	21	11th		R4		Robert Dolevski	11
2012	Victorian State League Division 2	22	14	5	3	49	20	+29	47	1st				Jamie Meehan	7
2013	Victorian State League Division 1	22	3	5	14	12	38	−26	14	12th		R2		Josip Loncaric	4
2014	Victorian State League Division 1	22	12	2	8	46	31	+15	38	3rd		R3	6P	Franc Carafa, Nathan Jones	8

As Fawkner-Whittlesea Blues
League											Finals	Dockerty Cup	FFA Cup	Top Goalscorer	
Season	Division	Pld	W	D	L	GF	GA	GD	Pts	Position	Finals	Dockerty Cup	FFA Cup	Player/s	Goals
**2005**	Victorian Premier League	26	12	7	7	47	37	+10	43	**4th**	Elimination Final			Zoran Petrevski Mark Tsiorlas	10
**2006**	Victorian Premier League	26	10	1	15	38	51	−13	31	**10th**				Mark Tsiorlas	13

As Manningham
League											Finals	Dockerty Cup	FFA Cup	Top Goalscorer	
Season	Division	Pld	W	D	L	GF	GA	GD	Pts	Position	Finals	Dockerty Cup	FFA Cup	Player/s	Goals
2009	Victorian Metropolitan League South-East	18	3	1	14	31	49	−18	10	7th				Roberto Rositano	7
2010	Victorian Provisional League South-East	22	4	3	15	28	53	−25	15	12th				Roberto Rositano	14
2011	Victorian Metropolitan League Central	20	12	1	7	57	36	+21	37	3rd				Tiago Da Silva	15
2012	Victorian Metropolitan League Central	20	12	2	6	53	28	+25	38	3rd		R1		Tiago Da Silva	17
2013	Victorian State League Division 5	21	10	4	7	46	39	+7	34	5th		R2		Roberto Rositano	12
2014	Victorian State League Division 4	22	6	1	15	25	44	−19	19	11th		R1	1P	Jordan Cirianni	4
2015	Victorian State League Division 1	22	6	3	13	30	44	−14	21	10th		R2	4P	Zane Sole	10
2016	Victorian State League Division 1	22	12	3	7	43	35	+8	39	5th		R2	4P	Vojtěch Engelmann	11
2017	Victorian State League Division 1	22	8	6	8	26	29	−3	30	7th		R2	4P	Lucas Johns	4
2018	Victorian State League Division 1	21	17	1	3	61	18	+43	52	1st	**1st**	R5	5P	Dean Lorenzi	18
2019	NPL Victoria 2	28	12	5	11	48	44	+4	41	5th		R4	4P	Billy Romas	11
2020	NPL Victoria 2	**Season cancelled due to COVID-19**													
2021	NPL Victoria 2	14	2	4	8	24	36	−12	10	Abandoned		R5	5P	Billy Romas	5
2022	NPL Victoria 2	22	6	6	10	29	34	−5	24	8th		R5	5P	Jacob Byrns	6

== Records ==
=== Individual Records ===
Most Appearances- (485) (Australia) Tony Schipano (1980–1983, 1985–1992, 1994–2003)

Top Goalscorer- (45) (Australia) Bruno Cozzella (1983–1986, 1988)

=== Team Records ===
Highest League Position: 1st Victorian Premier League (2002)

Lowest League Position: 7th Victorian Metropolitan League South-East (2009)

Most Wins In A Single Season: 22, (1982)

Most Draws In A Single Season: 13, (1994)

Most Losses In A Single Season: 17, (1989 and 2008)

Most Points In A Single Season: 46, (1982, and 1999)

Most Goals Scored In A Single Season: 81, (1978)

Most Goals Conceded In A Single Season: 59, (2008)

Biggest League Win: Fawkner 11–0 South Dandenong, Victorian Provisional League, 10 September 1977

Biggest League Defeat: Fawkner Blues 0–6 Heidelberg United, Victorian Premier League, 13 July 2008

Highest Scoring League Game: Fawkner 11–0 South Dandenong, Victorian Provisional, League 10 September 1977

Manningham 4–7 Albert Park, Victorian Metropolitan League Central, 9 April 2011

Manningham 4–7 Kingston City, NPL Victoria 2, 1 May 2021

=== Attendances ===
Highest ever attendance: 6,500 vs Preston Lions at Bob Jane Stadium, Victorian Premier League Grand Final, 25 August 2002

Highest home attendance: 4,750 vs Preston Lions at Epping Stadium, Victorian Premier League 4 July 2005

== Honours ==
=== League ===
- **Victorian Premier League** / **NPL Victoria (Victorian First tier)**
  - Minor Premiers(1) 2002
  - Runners Up(1) 1993
- **NPL Victoria 2** / **Victorian Premier League 1 (Victorian second tier)**
  - Runners Up(1) 2023
- **Victorian Metropolitan League Division 1**/**State League 1 (Victorian third tier)**
  - **Champions(2)** 1982, 2018
- **Victorian Metropolitan League Division 2**/**State League 2 (Victorian fourth tier)**
  - **Champions(1)** 1981
  - Runners Up(1) 2010
- **Victorian Metropolitan League Division 2/**State League 2 North-West **(Victorian fifth tier)**
  - **Champions(1)** 2012
- **Victorian Metropolitan League Division 3/**State League 3 North-West **(Victorian sixth tier)**
  - Runners Up(1) 1980
- **Provisional League**/**Victorian Metropolitan League Division 4** **(Victorian seventh tier)**
  - **Champions(1)** 1978
  - **Runners Up(3)** 1973,1975,1977
- **Metropolitan League 5 South-East**
  - **Champions(1)** 2017

=== Cup ===
- **Dockerty Cup**
  - **Winners(1)** 1984
  - Runners Up(1) 2004

== Individual honours ==
FFV Best and Fairest

- 2011 Mens Metro Central – Steven Dimitriovski

VPL Player of the Year

- 1989 – George Campbell
- 1990 – Claude Lucchesi

Bill Fleming Medal

- 2002 – Henry Fa'arodo
- 2003 – Tony Schipano

VPL Goalkeeper of the Year

- 2007 – Steve Tilovski

VPL Coach of the Year

- 2002 – Josip Biskic

VPL Under 21 Player of the Year

- 2002 – Steven Panebianco

Wienstein Medal

- 1997 – Michael Ferrante

Jimmy Rooney Medal

- 1993 – Adrian Pender

== Current squad ==
=== Senior squad ===
Note: Flags indicate national team as defined under FIFA eligibility rules; some limited exceptions apply. Players may hold more than one non-FIFA nationality.

No.	Pos.	Nation	Player
1	GK	AUS	George Tzamouranis
2	DF	AUS	Marco Tavella
4	DF	AUS	Dau Akol
5	DF	AUS	Alex Castiello
6	MF	JPN	Junya Kada
7	MF	AUS	Jose Ramirez
8	MF	AUS	Akiel Raffie
9	FW	AUS	Ben Everson
10	MF	AUS	Chris Theodorakopoulos
11	FW	AUS	Robert Harding

No.	Pos.	Nation	Player
12	MF	AUS	James Tountas
13	FW	AUS	Abdul Abdella
14	DF	AUS	Owen Dufton
16	FW	AUS	Salvatore Accardo
18	MF	AUS	Nick Voulgaris
19	DF	AUS	Rhys Dufton
26	DF	AUS	Daniel Scopelliti
—	MF	AUS	Ali Turgut
—	MF	AUS	Ioannis Georgopoulos
—	MF	AUS	Mohammed Al Saadi

== Notable players ==
- (Australia) Adrian Zahra (Youth Career)
- (Australia) Andreas Govas (Youth Career)
- (Australia) Patrick Kisnorbo (Youth Career)
- (Australia) Doug Brown (1987–1988)
- (Scotland) Scott Fraser (1988)
- (Scotland) George Campbell (1989)
- (Australia) Dean Anastasiadis (1991–1992)
- (New Zealand) Chris Jackson (1993–1994)
- (Australia) Brian Bothwell (1993, 1994 & 1996)
- (Australia) Ante Juric (1994)
- (Australia) Marcus Stergiopoulos (1996, 2011)
- (Australia) Jeff Olver (1997)
- (Croatia) Josip Biskic (1998–2001)
- (Solomon Islands) Henry Fa'arodo (2002, 2004)
- (Nigeria) Chimaobi Nwaogazi (2003)
- (Australia) Massimo Murdocca (2004–2005)
- (Australia) Andrew Marth (2004)
- (Australia) Michael Ferrante (2004)
- (Australia) John Markovski (2004–2006)
- (Australia) Saša Ognenovski (2005)
- (Australia) Vince Lia (2005)
- (Australia) Carl Recchia (2006–2007)
- (New Zealand) Ben Sigmund (2006)
- (New Zealand) Dakota Lucas (2015)
- (Czech Republic) Vojtěch Engelmann (2016)
- (India) Siddharth Singh (2016–2017)
- (Collectivity of Saint Martin) Nicolas Chalmet (2022–)

== Notable managers ==
- (Croatia) Branko Čulina (1994)
- (Australia) Michael Micevski (1994)
- (Scotland) Kenny Murphy (1997–2000)
- (Croatia) Josip Biskić (2002–2003)
- (Australia) Eddie Krncevic (2003)
- (Australia) John Markovski (2004–2006)

== See also ==
- Fawkner-Whittlesea Blues
