= Steven Pace =

Australian soccer player

Personal information
- Full name: Steven Joseph Pace
- Date of birth: 6 March 1983 (age 43)
- Place of birth: Melbourne, Australia
- Height: 1.85 m (6 ft 1 in)
- Position: Central defender

Team information
- Current team: Heidelberg United
- Number: 17

Youth career
- Keilor Park
- VIS
- AIS

Senior career*
Years	Team	Apps	(Gls)
2001–2003	South Melbourne	8	(1)
2003–2004	Essendon Royals	86	(5)
2005–2007	Preston Lions	64	(4)
2007–2010	Melbourne Victory	8	(0)
2010–2014	Hume City FC	81	(5)
2015–	Heidelberg United	122	(11)
- * Club domestic league appearances and goals as of 30 September 2019

Steven Pace (born 6 March 1983) is an Australian soccer player who plays for Heidelberg United FC.

== Club career ==
Earlier in his career, Pace played for various Victorian teams, including South Melbourne, Essendon Royals and the Preston Lions. He has been described as a "utility" player, having played as a midfielder as well as a central defender. He played in the latter position for the Preston Lions in their successful 2007 campaign, when they won the Victorian Premier League Championship.

When the Melbourne Victory signed Pace in October 2007, coach Ernie Merrick said about him:

"Steven reads the game well, has excellent speed, good distribution and possesses great maturity"

He made his first appearance for the Melbourne Victory against the Central Coast Mariners on 4 November 2007. Pace departed the Victory in 2010, making 8 league appearances in his time there.

After leaving Victory, Pace joined Hume City FC and spent the following four and a half years with the Broadmeadows-based club.

In 2015, Pace joined Heidelberg United FC.

== Honours ==
With Melbourne Victory:

- (Australia) A-League Championship: 2008-2009
- (Australia) A-League Premiership: 2008-2009
- (Australia) National Premier Leagues Victoria 2007

With Heidelberg United FC:

- (Victoria (state)) National Premier Leagues Victoria Premiers 2017
- (Victoria (state)) Dockerty Cup 2017
