= 2015 Football Federation Victoria season =

Football Federation Victoria
- Season: 2015

The 2015 Football Federation Victoria season was the 104th season of competitive soccer in Victoria. It was the second season under the new competition format for state-level soccer.

== NPL Victoria ==
NPL Victoria
- Season: 2015
- Champions: Bentleigh Greens
- Premiers: South Melbourne
- Matches: 137
- Goals: 388 (2.83 per match)
- Top goalscorer: Milos Lujic (18 goals)
- Biggest home win: South Melbourne 7−1 North Geelong Warriors (29 May 2015)
- Biggest away win: Green Gully 2−8 Heidelberg United (11 April 2015)
- Highest scoring: Green Gully 2−8 Heidelberg United (11 April 2015)

The 2015 National Premier Leagues Victoria season was played over 26 rounds. The overall premier of this division qualified for the 2015 National Premier Leagues finals series, competing with the other state federation champions in a final knockout tournament to decide the National Premier Leagues champion for 2015.

Pos	Team	Pld	W	D	L	GF	GA	GD	Pts	Qualification or relegation
1	South Melbourne	26	18	4	4	58	22	+36	58	2015 National Premier Leagues Finals
2	Bentleigh Greens (C)	26	17	7	2	48	25	+23	58	2015 Victoria Finals
3	Heidelberg United	26	15	6	5	51	29	+22	51	2015 Victoria Finals
4	Melbourne Knights	26	15	5	6	39	27	+12	50	2015 Victoria Finals
5	Hume City	26	13	5	8	41	28	+13	44	2015 Victoria Finals
6	Pascoe Vale	26	12	4	10	34	30	+4	40	2015 Victoria Finals
7	Green Gully	26	11	4	11	52	45	+7	37	
8	Port Melbourne	26	9	6	11	37	34	+3	33	
9	Avondale FC	26	8	7	11	37	42	−5	31	
10	Northcote City	26	9	3	14	32	49	−17	30	
11	Oakleigh Cannons	26	7	5	14	33	41	−8	26	
12	North Geelong Warriors (R)	26	6	3	17	30	52	−22	21	2015 relegation play-offs
13	Werribee City (R)	26	4	6	16	20	50	−30	18	Relegation to 2016 NPL Victoria 2
14	Dandenong Thunder (R)	26	4	3	19	30	69	−39	15	Relegation to 2016 NPL Victoria 2

Rules for classification: 1) points; 2) goal difference; 3) number of goals scored.
(C) Champions; (R) Relegated

=== Finals ===
Quarter-finals
3	Heidelberg United	2 (0)
6	Pascoe Vale	2 (3)
4	Melbourne Knights	2 (0)
5	Hume City	2 (2)

Semi-finals
1	South Melbourne	3
6	Pascoe Vale	2
2	Bentleigh Greens	2
5	Hume City	0

Final
1	South Melbourne	1
2	Bentleigh Greens	3

=== Promotion/relegation play-off ===
West vs East			Promotion/relegation play-off
			12	North Geelong Warriors	0
W2	Moreland Zebras	1	E2	Melbourne Victory Youth	2
E2	Melbourne Victory Youth	2

=== Top scorers ===
Rank	Player	Club	Goals
1	(Australia) Milos Lujic	South Melbourne	18
2	(England) Daniel Heffernan	Heidelberg United	13
3	(Australia) Liam Boland	Green Gully	12
4	(Australia) Christopher Lucas	Bentleigh Greens	11
5	(Australia) Stipo Andrijasevic	Melbourne Knights	10

== NPL Victoria 1 ==
=== West ===
NPL Victoria 1 West
- Season: 2015
- Matches: 93
- Goals: 305 (3.28 per match)

The 2015 National Premier Leagues Victoria 1 West was played over 28 rounds, with each team playing the teams in their conference twice and the other conference once. The top team at the end of the season was promoted to National Premier Leagues Victoria, Bentleigh Greens second placed team entered the promotion play-off.

Pos	Team	Pld	W	D	L	GF	GA	GD	Pts	Qualification or relegation
1	Bulleen Lions (P)	28	17	6	5	50	26	+24	57	Promotion to the 2016 NPL Victoria
2	Moreland Zebras	28	14	9	5	65	30	+35	51	2015 promotion play-offs
3	Moreland City	28	15	6	7	44	34	+10	51	
4	Ballarat Red Devils	28	14	7	7	55	36	+19	49	
5	Melbourne City Youth	28	13	5	10	56	45	+11	44	
6	St Albans Saints	28	12	6	10	47	29	+18	42	
7	Whittlesea Ranges	28	9	7	12	44	46	−2	34	
8	Sunshine George Cross	28	9	7	12	32	43	−11	34	
9	Bendigo City	28	6	7	15	38	55	−17	25	
10	Brunswick City	28	5	4	19	37	83	−46	19	

(P) Promoted

=== East ===
NPL Victoria 1 East
- Season: 2015
- Matches: 93
- Goals: 353 (3.8 per match)

The 2015 National Premier Leagues Victoria 1 East was played over 28 rounds, with each team playing the teams in their conference twice and the other conference once. The top team at the end of the season was promoted to National Premier Leagues Victoria, whilst the second placed team entered the promotion play-off.

Pos	Team	Pld	W	D	L	GF	GA	GD	Pts	Qualification or relegation
1	Richmond (C, P)	28	18	3	7	59	36	+23	57	Promotion to the 2016 NPL Victoria
2	Melbourne Victory Youth (P)	28	17	4	7	87	44	+43	55	2015 promotion play-offs
3	Dandenong City	28	14	6	8	59	35	+24	48	
4	Box Hill United	28	15	3	10	46	44	+2	48	
5	Goulburn Valley Suns	28	15	2	11	72	46	+26	47	
6	Kingston City	28	15	2	11	59	50	+9	47	
7	Eastern Lions	28	11	8	9	50	50	0	41	
8	Murray United	28	6	4	18	38	80	−42	22	
9	Springvale White Eagles	28	4	5	19	24	54	−30	17	
10	Nunawading City	28	0	1	27	32	127	−95	1	

(C) Champions; (P) Promoted

=== Grand Final ===
The NPL1 season concluded with a single match between the winners of the leagues in the West and East sections, to determine the NPL1 Victoria Champion.

20 September 2015

Bulleen Lions	1–2	Richmond
	Source

Jack Edwards Reserve

== Victoria State League 1 ==
=== North-West ===
Victorian State League 1 North-West
- Season: 2015

Pos	Team	Pld	W	D	L	GF	GA	GD	Pts	Qualification or relegation
1	Western Suburbs	22	14	3	5	42	21	+21	45	
2	Sydenham Park	22	14	3	5	43	28	+15	45	
3	Altona Magic	22	13	5	4	43	20	+23	44	
4	Preston Lions	22	13	4	5	35	23	+12	43	
5	North Sunshine Eagles	22	11	4	7	44	38	+6	37	
6	Keilor Park	22	8	3	11	34	33	+1	27	
7	Altona East Phoenix	22	8	3	11	37	42	−5	27	
8	Diamond Valley United	22	7	4	11	26	31	−5	25	
9	Westgate FC	22	7	2	13	36	48	−12	23	
10	Cairnlea FC	22	6	5	11	31	50	−19	23	
11	Corio (R)	22	5	5	12	33	53	−20	20	Relegation to the 2016 State League 2
12	Sunbury United (R)	22	4	3	15	23	40	−17	15	Relegation to the 2016 State League 2

(R) Relegated

=== South-East ===
Victorian State League 1 South-East
- Season: 2015

Pos	Team	Pld	W	D	L	GF	GA	GD	Pts	Qualification or relegation
1	Mornington	22	17	2	3	69	25	+44	53	
2	Clifton Hill	22	14	5	3	54	32	+22	47	
3	South Springvale	22	11	5	6	47	38	+9	38	
4	Langwarrin	22	12	3	7	47	34	+13	36 (Note: Langwarrin were deducted 3 points.)	
5	Malvern City	22	11	2	9	52	47	+5	35	
6	Warragul United	22	9	3	10	39	30	+9	30	
7	Frankston Pines	22	9	3	10	47	42	+5	30	
8	Morwell Pegasus	22	7	5	10	37	48	−11	26	
9	Casey Comets	22	5	9	8	21	30	−9	24	
10	Manningham United	22	6	3	13	30	44	−14	21	
11	Noble Park United (R)	22	4	3	15	23	59	−36	15	Relegation to the 2016 State League 2
12	Doncaster Rovers (R)	22	4	3	15	22	59	−37	15	Relegation to the 2016 State League 2

(R) Relegated

== Victoria State League 2 ==
=== North-West ===
Victorian State League 2 North-West
- Season: 2015

Pos	Team	Pld	W	D	L	GF	GA	GD	Pts	Qualification or relegation
1	Banyule City (P)	22	14	4	4	49	25	+24	46	Promotion to the 2016 State League 1
2	Yarraville (P)	22	14	3	5	51	24	+27	45	Promotion to the 2016 State League 1
3	Moreland United	22	14	3	5	51	29	+22	45	
4	Essendon Royals	22	14	2	6	52	30	+22	44	
5	Sporting Whittlesea	22	13	3	6	34	22	+12	42	
6	Geelong	22	12	4	6	37	31	+6	40	
7	Fitzroy City	22	9	4	9	42	38	+4	31	
8	Essendon United	22	6	6	10	36	44	−8	24	
9	Heidelberg Stars	22	5	5	12	26	39	−13	20	
10	Hume United	22	5	3	14	27	48	−21	18	
11	Westvale SC (R)	22	2	6	14	21	49	−28	12	Relegation to the 2016 State League 3
12	Melbourne University (R)	22	0	5	17	19	66	−47	5	Relegation to the 2016 State League 3

(P) Promoted; (R) Relegated

=== South-East ===
Victorian State League 2 South-East
- Season: 2015

Pos	Team	Pld	W	D	L	GF	GA	GD	Pts	Qualification or relegation
1	Berwick City (P)	22	14	4	4	48	26	+22	46	Promotion to the 2016 State League 1
2	Mooroolbark (P)	22	13	5	4	51	33	+18	44	Promotion to the 2016 State League 1
3	Old Scotch	22	12	3	7	49	34	+15	39	
4	Beaumaris	22	11	4	7	45	36	+9	37	
5	Sandringham	22	9	6	7	44	41	+3	33	
6	North Caulfield	22	10	2	10	51	46	+5	32	
7	Heatherton United	22	9	6	7	49	35	+14	30 (Note: Heatherton United were deducted 3 points.)	
8	Peninsula Strikers	22	7	5	10	41	56	−15	26	
9	Doveton	22	6	7	9	37	43	−6	25	
10	Seaford United	22	6	6	10	43	44	−1	24	
11	Old Melburnians (R)	22	4	7	11	36	51	−15	19	Relegation to the 2016 State League 3
12	Dingley Stars FC (R)	22	1	5	16	20	69	−49	8	Relegation to the 2016 State League 3

(P) Promoted; (R) Relegated

== Victoria State League 3 ==
=== North-West ===
Victorian State League 3 North-West
- Season: 2015

Pos	Team	Pld	W	D	L	GF	GA	GD	Pts	Qualification or relegation
1	Hoppers Crossing (P)	22	16	3	3	44	17	+27	51	Promotion to the 2016 State League 2
2	Altona City (P)	22	14	2	6	53	23	+30	44	Promotion to the 2016 State League 2
3	Whittlesea United	22	13	5	4	45	32	+13	44	
4	Williamstown SC	22	11	4	7	46	35	+11	37	
5	La Trobe University	22	10	2	10	43	40	+3	32	
6	Western Eagles	22	8	5	9	28	35	−7	29	
7	Upfield SC	22	8	4	10	46	51	−5	28	
8	Darebin United	22	7	5	10	36	50	−14	26	
9	Lalor United	22	6	5	11	33	37	−4	23	
10	Geelong Rangers	22	5	5	12	27	40	−13	20	Qualification to the 2015 relegation play-offs
11	Brunswick Zebras (R)	22	6	2	14	27	47	−20	20	Relegation to 2016 State League 4
12	North City Wolves (R)	22	6	2	14	31	52	−21	20	Relegation to 2016 State League 4

(P) Promoted; (R) Relegated

=== South-East ===
Victorian State League 3 South-East
- Season: 2015

Pos	Team	Pld	W	D	L	GF	GA	GD	Pts	Qualification or relegation
1	St Kilda SC (P)	22	14	6	2	53	26	+27	48	Promotion to the 2016 State League 2
2	Caulfield United Cobras (P)	22	10	7	5	37	29	+8	37	Promotion to the 2016 State League 2
3	Monbulk Rangers	22	10	6	6	44	32	+12	36	
4	South Yarra	22	10	5	7	45	38	+7	35	
5	Mazenod United	22	9	4	9	32	33	−1	31	
6	Knox City	22	8	6	8	26	25	+1	30	
7	Riversdale	22	8	6	8	34	34	0	30	
8	Ashburton United	22	8	2	12	26	35	−9	26	
9	Middle Park	22	5	9	8	36	44	−8	24	
10	Croydon City	22	7	3	12	32	48	−16	24	Qualification to the 2015 relegation play-offs
11	East Brighton United (R)	22	5	6	11	41	47	−6	21	Relegation to 2016 State League 4
12	Old Carey (R)	22	4	8	10	31	46	−15	20	Relegation to 2016 State League 4

(P) Promoted; (R) Relegated

=== Promotion/relegation play-off ===
North vs West			North-West play-off
			10	Geelong Rangers	1
N2	West Preston	1	W2	Brimbank Stallions	0
W2	Brimbank Stallions	2

South vs East			South-East play-off
			10	Croydon City Arrows	1
S2	Endeavour Hills	1	E2	Old Camberwell Grammarians	0
E2	Old Camberwell Grammarians	2

== Victoria State League 4 ==
=== North ===
Victorian State League 4 North
- Season: 2015

Pos	Team	Pld	W	D	L	GF	GA	GD	Pts	Qualification or relegation
1	Fawkner (P)	22	17	4	1	70	27	+43	55	Promotion to the 2016 State League 3
2	West Preston	22	15	3	4	66	36	+30	48	Qualification to the 2015 promotion play-offs
3	Bundoora United	22	14	3	5	54	27	+27	45	
4	Epping City	22	13	3	6	66	31	+35	42	
5	Plenty Valley	22	11	5	6	56	29	+27	38	
6	Watsonia Heights	22	11	3	8	51	38	+13	36	
7	FC Strathmore	22	10	4	8	56	34	+22	34	
8	Northern Falcons	22	5	5	12	36	49	−13	20	
9	Northern United	22	4	5	13	34	63	−29	17	
10	Newmarket Phoenix	22	8	4	10	45	56	−11	28	
11	Greenvale United	22	2	3	17	27	62	−35	9	Relegation to 2016 State League 5
12	Meadow Park	22	0	2	20	6	115	−109	2	Relegation to 2016 State League 5

(P) Promoted

=== West ===
Victorian State League 4 West
- Season: 2015

Pos	Team	Pld	W	D	L	GF	GA	GD	Pts	Qualification or relegation
1	Melbourne City (P)	22	13	5	4	53	30	+23	41 (Note: Melbourne City was deducted three points.)	Promotion to 2016 State League 3
2	Brimbank Stallions	22	13	5	4	45	22	+23	41 (Note: Brimbank Stallions was deducted three points.)	Promotion play-offs
3	Bell Park	22	12	4	6	41	27	+14	40	
4	Maribyrnong Greens	22	10	9	3	33	24	+9	39	
5	Sebastopol Vikings	22	10	5	7	44	36	+8	35	
6	Point Cook FC	22	10	2	10	39	40	−1	32	
7	Melton Phoenix	22	8	4	10	52	40	+12	28	
8	Altona North	22	8	4	10	35	35	0	28	
9	Surf Coast	22	8	3	11	34	46	−12	27	
10	Truganina Hornets	22	8	1	13	34	42	−8	25	
11	Keilor Wolves	22	5	5	12	27	41	−14	20	Relegation to 2016 State League 5
12	Laverton Park	22	2	3	17	23	77	−54	9	Relegation to 2016 State League 5

(P) Promoted

=== South ===
Victorian State League 4 South
- Season: 2015

Pos	Team	Pld	W	D	L	GF	GA	GD	Pts	Qualification or relegation
1	Brighton (P)	22	15	2	5	48	23	+25	47	Promotion to the 2016 State League 3
2	Endeavour Hills	22	14	3	5	65	37	+28	45	Qualification to the 2015 promotion play-offs
3	Bayside Argonauts	22	13	5	4	56	28	+28	44	
4	Endeavour United	22	11	4	7	48	38	+10	37	
5	Dandenong South	22	10	2	10	44	49	−5	32	
6	Hampton Park United	22	8	4	10	37	44	−7	28	
7	Noble Park	22	6	7	9	35	40	−5	25	
8	Brandon Park	22	6	7	9	33	42	−9	25	
9	Skye United	22	7	2	13	42	55	−13	23	
10	Keysborough	22	5	7	10	28	45	−17	22	
11	Lyndale United	22	5	7	10	35	56	−21	22	Relegation to 2016 State League 5
12	Sandown Lions	22	6	2	14	44	58	−14	20	Relegation to 2016 State League 5

(P) Promoted

=== East ===
Victorian State League 4 East
- Season: 2015

Pos	Team	Pld	W	D	L	GF	GA	GD	Pts	Qualification or relegation
1	Eltham Redbacks (P)	22	19	2	1	95	26	+69	59	Promotion to the 2016 State League 3
2	Old Camberwell Grammarians	22	13	5	4	62	34	+28	44	Qualification to the 2015 promotion play-offs
3	Monash University	22	11	7	4	61	41	+20	40	
4	Collingwood City	22	12	2	8	48	40	+8	38	
5	Ringwood City	22	10	5	7	54	38	+16	35	
6	Old Xaverians	22	9	6	7	44	39	+5	33	
7	Waverley Wanderers	22	10	1	11	48	45	+3	31	
8	Elwood City	22	7	3	12	35	54	−19	24	
9	Whitehorse United	22	6	3	13	44	55	−11	21	
10	Rowville Eagles	22	5	4	13	35	62	−27	19	
11	University of Melbourne	22	5	4	13	33	60	−27	19	Relegation to 2016 State League 5
12	Heidelberg Eagles	22	4	0	18	31	96	−65	12	Relegation to 2016 State League 5

(P) Promoted

== Victoria State League 5 ==
=== North ===
Victorian State League 5 North
- Season: 2015

Pos	Team	Pld	W	D	L	GF	GA	GD	Pts	Qualification or relegation
1	Mill Park SC	21	18	3	0	71	11	+60	57	Promotion to the 2016 State League 4
2	Marcellin Old Collegians SC	21	14	4	3	62	23	+39	46	Promotion to the 2016 State League 4
3	Old Ivanhoe Grammarians SC	21	9	5	7	29	36	−7	32	
4	Reservoir Yeti	21	9	5	7	33	34	−1	32	
5	Yarra Jets	21	8	3	10	52	35	+17	27	
6	Old Trinity Grammarians SC	21	5	3	13	37	40	−3	18	
7	Keon Park SC	21	4	4	13	33	70	−37	16	
8	Mitchell Rangers	21	3	1	17	28	96	−68	10	

=== West ===
Victorian State League 5 West
- Season: 2015

Pos	Team	Pld	W	D	L	GF	GA	GD	Pts	Qualification or relegation
1	Spring Hills FC	21	16	1	4	60	24	+36	49	Promotion to the 2016 State League 4
2	Balmoral FC	21	15	3	3	66	20	+46	48	Promotion to the 2016 State League 4
3	Lara SC	21	15	2	4	66	21	+45	47	
4	RMIT FC	21	11	2	8	61	37	+24	35	
5	Kyneton District SC	21	9	3	9	51	44	+7	30	
6	Melbourne Lions	21	7	1	13	30	67	−37	22	
7	Gisborne SC	21	2	2	17	23	57	−34	8	
8	Sporting Carlton	21	1	2	18	37	124	−87	5	

=== South ===
Victorian State League 5 South
- Season: 2015

Pos	Team	Pld	W	D	L	GF	GA	GD	Pts	Qualification or relegation
1	Springvale City SC	22	17	3	2	76	24	+52	54	Promotion to the 2016 State League 4
2	Harrisfield Hurricanes SC	22	16	4	2	66	21	+45	52	Promotion to the 2016 State League 4
3	Rosebud Heart SC	22	16	1	5	86	27	+59	49	
4	Baxter SC	22	13	4	5	55	41	+14	43	
5	Chelsea FC	22	9	5	8	59	40	+19	32	
6	Albert Park SC	22	9	5	8	46	38	+8	32	
7	East Bentleigh Strikers	22	10	0	12	40	53	−13	30	
8	Old Mentonians SC	22	7	5	10	30	47	−17	26	
9	White Star Dandenong SC	22	8	1	13	31	49	−18	25	
10	Casey Panthers SC	22	4	5	13	33	74	−41	17	
11	Parkmore SC	22	3	3	16	21	62	−41	12	
12	Prahran City FC	22	1	2	19	23	90	−67	5	

=== East ===
Victorian State League 5 East
- Season: 2015

Pos	Team	Pld	W	D	L	GF	GA	GD	Pts	Qualification or relegation
1	Kings Domain FC	21	14	5	2	70	26	+44	47	Promotion to the 2016 State League 4
2	Glen Waverley SC	21	13	3	5	45	23	+22	42	Promotion to the 2016 State League 4
3	St Kevins Old Boys SC	21	11	5	5	54	30	+24	38	
4	Mt. Lilydale Old Collegians SC	21	11	4	6	66	32	+34	37	
5	Healesville SC	21	9	4	8	47	38	+9	31	
6	Swinburne FC	21	8	6	7	47	33	+14	30	
7	Montrose SC	21	3	1	17	27	70	−43	10	
8	Lilydale Eagles SC	21	1	0	20	20	124	−104	3	

== Women's Premier League ==
(Victoria (state)) Sportsmart Women's Premier League
- Season: 2015
- Champions: South Melbourne
- Premiers: Boroondara Eagles

This was the final season of the WPL format, known for sponsorship reasons as the Sportsmart Women's Premier League. This competition was replaced by the National Premier Leagues Victoria Women.

Pos	Team	Pld	W	D	L	GF	GA	GD	Pts	Qualification or relegation
1	Boroondara Eagles (X)	22	15	5	2	82	20	+62	50	Finals series
2	Ashburton United	22	14	5	3	67	26	+41	47	Finals series
3	South Melbourne (C, X)	22	15	1	6	68	39	+29	46	Finals series
4	Bundoora United (X)	22	15	1	6	48	24	+24	46	Finals series
5	Heidelberg United	22	13	4	5	51	25	+26	43	Finals series
6	Bulleen Lions	22	11	3	8	73	40	+33	36	
7	Sandringham (X)	22	9	3	10	40	38	+2	30	
8	Victorian Women's NTC	22	7	7	8	39	40	−1	28	
9	Box Hill United	22	7	5	10	38	36	+2	26	
10	Casey Comets (X)	22	2	4	16	21	59	−38	10	
11	Caufield United Cobras (X)	22	3	0	19	17	106	−89	9	
12	South Yarra (X)	22	2	0	20	11	102	−91	6	

Source: foxsportspulse.com
Rules for classification: 1) points; 2) goal difference; 3) number of goals scored.
(C) Champions; (X) Not granted a licence for the 2016 Women's NPL season

=== Finals ===
Qualifying Finals
2	Ashburton United	3
3	South Melbourne	2
4	Bundoora United	1
5	Heidelberg United	4

Semi-finals
1	Boroondara Eagles	3
Ashburton United	0
South Melbourne	2
Heidelberg United	1

Preliminary Finals
Ashburton United	0
South Melbourne	3

Grand Final
Boroondara Eagles	1 (4)
South Melbourne	1 (5)

== Cup Competitions ==
=== Dockerty Cup ===
Football Victoria soccer clubs competed in 2015 for the Dockerty Cup. The tournament doubled as the Victorian qualifiers for the 2015 FFA Cup, with the top four clubs progressing to the Round of 32. A total of 191 clubs entered the qualifying phase, with the clubs entering in a staggered format.

The Cup was won by South Melbourne.

In addition to the two A-League clubs (Melbourne Victory and Melbourne City), the four semi-finalists (Heidelberg United, Hume City, Oakleigh Cannons and South Melbourne) competed in the final rounds of the 2015 FFA Cup.
