= Nicolas Chalmet =

Saint-Martinois association football player (born 1988)

Personal information
- Date of birth: 12 September 1988 (age 38)
- Place of birth: Nîmes, France
- Height: 1.82 m (5 ft 11 1/2 in)
- Position: Attacking midfielder

Team information
- Current team: Manningham United Blues
- Number: 17

Senior career*
Years	Team	Apps	(Gls)
2010–2014	Marigot		
2014	Moore Park Beach FC	8	(3)
2014–2016	Marigot		
2016–2018	Waiheke United		
2019	Waitakere United	0	(0)
2019	Western Springs	3	(0)
2020–2021	Mill Park		
2022-	Manningham United Blues	6	(0)

International career^{‡}
2010–	Saint Martin	7	(0)
- * Club domestic league appearances and goals as of 28 April 2022 ‡ National team caps and goals as of 14 February 2019

Nicolas Chalmet (born 12 September 1988) is a Saint-Martinois international footballer who plays as an attacking midfielder for Australian club Manningham United Blues.
