= 2013 FFV State Knockout Cup =

Tournament details
- Country: Australia
- Teams: 130

The 2013 FFV State Knockout Cup was the third edition of a football (soccer) knockout-cup competition held between men's clubs in Victoria, Australia in 2013, the annual edition of the Dockerty Cup. The first round was played during the weekend of 3 March 2013, with the Final scheduled for 7 September.

Unlike previous years, this tournament does not stagger the entrance of teams based on their position on the football pyramid; teams from as high as the Victorian Premier League participated in the opening round, though 16 selected clubs were given byes to the Fourth Round.

== Format ==
Round	Clubs remaining	Clubs involved	Winners from previous round	New entries this round	Scheduled for weekend(s) of
Round 1	94	28	none	none	2 March
Round 2	80	64	14	40	9 March
Round 3	48	32	32	none	23 March
Round 4	32	32	16	16	4 May
Round 5	16	16	16	none	8 June
Quarter-Finals	8	8	8	none	17 and 24 July
Semi-Finals	4	4	4	none	21 August
Final	2	2	2	none	7 September

During Rounds 1–4, the matches will be played within 4 geographical "zones" (North, South, East and West), with the zones merging into a single competition in Round 5.

== Round 1 ==
50 Clubs were randomly granted byes into Round 2; the remaining 28 of the introductory teams played in Round 1 on the weekend of 2 March. The Draw for this round was held on 15 February.

=== North Zone ===
2 March	Cobram Victory	3–0	FC Strathmore	Barooga Recreation Reserve
15:00 AEDT

2 March	Whittlesea United	0–1	Brunswick City	Dunstan Reserve – Pitch 1
17:30 AEDT

2 March	Northern Falcons	0–6	Bundoora United	State Football Centre – Pitch 1
16:00 AEDT

2 March	Cobram SC	0–3	Mitchell Rangers	Barooga Recreation Reserve
18:00 AEDT

2 March	Watsonia Heights	3–2	Kyneton District	James Reserve
15:00 AEDT

=== East Zone ===
2 March	Whitehorse United	0–3	Malvern City	Knox Regional Football Centre – Pitch 1
15:30 AEDT

2 March	Collingwood City	4–8	Croydon City Arrows	Dorset Recreation Reserve
15:00 AEDT

1 March	Boroondara Eagles	2–1	Ringwood City	Knox Regional Football Centre – Pitch 1
20:30 AEDT

=== South Zone ===
2 March	Mornington	2–1	Peninsula Strikers	Dallas Brooks Park – Pitch 1
15:00 AEDT

2 March	Monash University	3–0	Waverley Victory	Knox Regional Football Centre – Pitch 1
12:30 AEDT

=== West Zone ===
2 March	Sunshine George Cross	2–1	North Sunshine Eagles	Chaplin Reserve
15:00 AEDT

2 March	St Albans Saints	3–0	Melton Phoenix	MacPherson Park
15:00 AEDT

2 March	Westvale SC	3–2	Essendon Royals	Reggio Calabria Club
15:00 AEDT

2 March	Ballarat Red Devils	9–1	Truganina Hornets	Trekardo Park
15:00 AEDT

== Round 2 ==
These matches were played during the weekend of 9 March. The Draw for this round was held on 15 February, the same day as the Draw for Round 1.

=== North Zone ===
9 March	Moreland City	3–0	Fawkner Blues FC	Campbell Reserve
15:00 AEDT

9 March	Bundoora United	2–2 (4–5 p)	Mill Park	Hillsview Recreation Reserve
15:00 AEDT

17 March	Watsonia Heights	0–1	Preston Lions	Gabonia Avenue Reserve
15:00 AEDT

9 March	Brunswick City	8–1	West Preston	Dunstan Reserve
17:30 AEDT

9 March	Northern Roosters	2–3	La Trobe University	La Trobe University
16:00 AEDT

9 March	Mitchell Rangers	0–8	Heidelberg Stars	State Football Centre
14:00 AEDT

17 March	Shepparton SC	1–3	Sunbury United	Langama Park
15:00 AEDT

11 March	Cobram Victory	3–0	Wangaratta City	Barooga Recreation Reserve
15:00 AEDT

=== East Zone ===
9 March	Old Camberwell	1–2	Monbulk Rangers	Clifton Park
16:00 AEDT

13 March	Old Xaverians	0–4	Box Hill United	State Football Centre
20:30 AEDT

11 March	Boroondara Eagles	1–2	Croydon City	Dorset Recreation Reserve
20:30 AEDT

9 March	Eltham Redbacks	0–6	FC Clifton Hill	State Football Centre
17:00 AEDT

9 March	Melbourne University	3–2	Glen Waverley	Knox Regional Football Centre – Pitch 1
18:30 AEDT

9 March	Old Carey	3–1	Manningham United	State Football Centre
11:00 AEDT

13 March	Malvern City	3–1	Riversdale	State Football Centre
20:30 AEDT

9 March	Knox City	0–1	Old Melburnians	State Football Centre
17:00 AEDT

=== South Zone ===
9 March	Berwick City	1–2	St Kilda	Jack Thomas Reserve
15:00 AEDT

9 March	Kingston City	5–0	Keysborough	The Grange Reserve
15:00 AEDT

9 March	Sandown Lions	0–6	Mornington	Dallas Brooks Park
15:00 AEDT

9 March	Elwood City	3–3 (4–3 p)	Seaford United	Elwood Park
15:00 AEDT

9 March	Monash University	1–2	Springvale White Eagles	Serbian Sports Centre
15:00 AEDT

9 March	Mazenod United	9–0	Prahran City	Kingston Heath Soccer Complex – Pitch 1
14:00 AEDT

9 March	Brighton	5–2	Parkmore	Parkmore Soccer Club
17:00 AEDT

9 March	Middle Park	0–1	South Yarra	State Football Centre
17:00 AEDT

=== West Zone ===
9 March	Sebastopol Vikings	2–1	Brimbank Stallions	St Georges Reserve – Pitch 1
15:00 AEDT

9 March	Hoppers Crossing	3–1	Altona North	Grange Reserve – Pitch 1
15:00 AEDT

9 March	Sunshine George Cross	5–1	Point Cook	Chaplin Reserve
15:00 AEDT

9 March	Keilor Park	8–2	Corio	Keilor Park Recreation Reserve – Pitch 1
15:00 AEDT

11 March	Westvale	0–6	St Albans Saints	Churchill Reserve
16:30 AEDT

9 March	Western Eagles	11–1	Warrnambool Wolves	Polish Sports & Recreation Complex – Pitch 1
15:00 AEDT	Alec Strycharski 4, 12, 28 John Strycharski 31 Kacper Hubiak 53, 60 Phillip Mucha 58, 72 Wojciech Galon 76 Stefan Jesensek 83, 85		47

9 March	Balmoral	3–2	Melbourne Lions	Balmoral Park
15:00 AEDT

9 March	Cairnlea	0–3	Ballarat Red Devils	Trekardo Park
15:00 AEDT

== Round 3 ==
These matches were played on the weekend of 23 March; the Draw was held on 12 March.

=== North Zone ===
1 April	Brunswick City	4–6	Cobram Victory	CB Smith Reserve
15:00 AEDT

23 March	Moreland City	8–0	Mill Park	Findon Reserve
15:00 AEDT

23 March	Heidelberg Stars	1–2	Preston Lions	Genis Steel Stadium (BT Connor Reserve)
15:00 AEDT

23 March	Sunbury United	3–0	La Trobe University	Langama Park
15:00 AEDT

=== East Zone ===
22 March	Monbulk Rangers	4–1	Old Carey	Monbulk Recreation Reserve
20:30 AEDT

23 March	Box Hill	2–1 (a.e.t.)	Malvern City	Kevin Bartlett Reserve
15:00 AEDT

23 March	FC Clifton Hill	3–1	Croydon City	Quarries Park
15:00 AEDT

23 March	Old Melburnians	3–2	Melbourne University	State Football Centre
16:30 AEDT

=== South Zone ===
23 March	St Kilda	3–1	Mornington	Dallas Brooks Park
15:00 AEDT

23 March	Kingston City	2–0	Mazenod United	The Grange Reserve
17:00 AEDT

23 March	Elwood City	2–1	South Yarra	Elwood Park
15:00 AEDT

23 March	Brighton	0–2	Springvale White Eagles	Kingston Heath Soccer Complex
15:00 AEDT

=== West Zone ===
23 March	Sebastopol Vikings	2–4	Western Eagles	St Georges Reserve
15:00 AEDT			Alec Strycharski 15, 25, 38 Kacper Hubiak 73

23 March	Hoppers Crossing	2–0	Balmoral	Grange Reserve
15:00 AEDT

23 March	Sunshine George Cross	2–0	St Albans Saints	Chaplin Reserve
15:00 AEDT

23 March	Ballarat Red Devils	2–4	Keilor Park	Trekrado Park
15:00 AEDT

== Round 4 ==
Round 4 saw the introduction of 16 Seeded Clubs, selected based on their performance in the 2012 FFV State Knockout Cup.

=== Clubs Entering ===
North Zone

- Pascoe Vale
- Moreland Zebras
- Heidelberg United
- Northcote City

East Zone

- Oakleigh Cannons
- South Melbourne
- Port Melbourne Sharks
- Richmond Eagles

South Zone

- Dandenong Thunder
- Southern Stars
- Bentleigh Greens
- Werribee City (Note: Hume City were originally seeded in Werribee City's place, but withdrew from the competition.)

West Zone

- Green Gully Cavaliers
- Melbourne Knights
- North Geelong Warriors
- Altona Magic

The Round 4 matches were played on the weekend of 4 May; the Draw was held on 25 March.

=== North Zone ===
4 May	Heidelberg United	0–5	Moreland City	Olympic Village
14:00 AEST

4 May	Sunbury United	1–2	Preston Lions	Langama Park
14:00 AEST			Filip Dimovski 68 Nikola Naumovski 90+

4 May	Pascoe Vale	4–3 (a.e.t.)	Cobram Victory	Hosken Reserve
14:00 AEST

4 May	Northcote City	2–1	Moreland Zebras	John Cain Memorial Park
14:00 AEST

=== East Zone ===
4 May	Richmond Eagles	6–1	Monbulk Rangers	Kevin Bartlett Reserve
14:00 AEST

4 May	Old Melburnians	0–2	FC Clifton Hill	Howard Dawson Reserve
14:00 AEST

4 May	South Melbourne	3–0	Oakleigh Cannons	Lakeside Stadium
14:00 AEST

4 May	Port Melbourne Sharks	2–3	Box Hill United	SS Anderson Reserve
16:30 AEST

=== South Zone ===
4 May	Kingston City	0–4	Dandenong Thunder	The Grange Reserve
14:00 AEST

4 May	Werribee City	1–1 (9–8 p)	Southern Stars	Galvin Park Reserve
14:00 AEST

4 May	Bentleigh Greens	2–1	Springvale White Eagles	Kingston Heath Soccer Complex
14:00 AEST

4 May	St Kilda	2–1	Elwood City	Elwood Park
14:00 AEST

=== West Zone ===
3 May	Melbourne Knights	0–1	Keilor Park	Knights Stadium
19:30 AEST

4 May	Western Eagles	1–1 (a.e.t.) (4–2 p)	Hoppers Crossing	Polish Sports & Recreation Complex
14:00 AEST	Robert Chelchowski 50

4 May	North Geelong Warriors	1–5	Green Gully Cavaliers	Elcho Park
14:00 AEST

4 May	Altona Magic	1–2 (a.e.t.)	Sunshine George Cross	Paisley Park Soccer Complex
14:00 AEST

== Round 5 ==
This round saw the 4 winners from each Zone in the previous round enter a single 16-Club draw. These matches were played on the weekend of 8 June; the Draw took place on 6 May.

7 June	Richmond Eagles	3–0	Box Hill United	Kevin Bartlett Reserve
19:30 AEST

8 June	Keilor Park	1–2	Green Gully Cavaliers	Keilor Park Recreation Reserve
14:00 AEST

8 June	Moreland City	3–4 (a.e.t.)	FC Clifton Hill	Clifton Park
14:00 AEST

8 June	Pascoe Vale	0–1	Werribee City	Hosken Reserve
14:00 AEST

8 June	Western Eagles	1–2	Preston Lions	Polish Sports and Recreation Complex
14:00 AEST	Phillip Mucha 6

8 June	St Kilda	0–3	Dandenong Thunder	Elwood Park
14:00 AEST

8 June	Sunshine George Cross	2–0	Bentleigh Greens	Chaplin Reserve
14:00 AEST

10 June	South Melbourne	3–2 (a.e.t.)	Northcote City	Lakeside Stadium
15:00 AEST

== Quarter-finals ==
The Draw for the quarter-finals took place on 12 June; the matches took place on 23 July.

23 July	Green Gully Cavaliers	3–2	Clifton Hill	Green Gully Reserve
7:30 PM

23 July	Richmond Eagles	1–3	Sunshine George Cross	Kevin Bartlett Reserve
7:30 PM

23 July	South Melbourne	4–2	Preston Lions	Lakeside stadium
7:30 PM	??		Dauda 7', 53'	Attendance: 450

23 July	Dandenong Thunder	3–3 (6–5 pen.)	Werribee City	George Andrews Reserve
7:30 PM

== Semi-finals ==
The Draw for the semi-finals took place on 15 July.

21 August	South Melbourne	0–1	Green Gully Cavaliers	JL Murphy Reserve
7:30 PM

28 August	Dandenong Thunder	5–0	Sunshine George Cross	David Barro Stadium
8 PM

== Final ==
The Final was played at the neutral venue of Knights Stadium on 8 September.

8 September	Dandenong Thunder	1–3	Green Gully Cavaliers	Knights Stadium
3PM	Foster 78'		Vergas 4' (o.g.); Hayne 57', 83' (pen.)	Attendance: 1,367
