= Akiel Raffie =

English footballer

Personal information
- Full name: Akiel Raffie
- Date of birth: 15 February 2003 (age 23)
- Place of birth: Sydney, Australia
- Height: 1.67 m (5 ft 6 in)
- Position: Midfielder

Team information
- Current team: Manningham United

Youth career
- 2014–2021: Fleetwood Town

Senior career*
Years	Team	Apps	(Gls)
2021–2023	Fleetwood Town	0	(0)
2021	→ Bamber Bridge (loan)	2	(0)
2021–2022	→ Kendal Town (loan)	7	(1)
2022	→ Nantwich Town (loan)	17	(2)
2023	→ Marine (loan)	4	(0)
2023	Espinho	5	(1)
2023–2024	Nantwich Town	0	(0)
2024–2025	Beaconsfield Town	0	(0)
2025–2026	Heidelberg United	16	(0)
2026–	Manningham United	4	(1)
- * Club domestic league appearances and goals as of 05:05, 25 July 2026 (UTC)

Akiel Raffie (born 15 February 2003) is an Australian professional footballer who plays as a midfielder for Victoria Premier League club Manningham United.

== Early life ==
Raffie was born in Sydney and raised in Camden, New South Wales to a South African father, Faghrie Deen, and Australian mother, Nicole Hogg. He attended Currans Hill Public School and trained with local side South West Wanderers. He first caught the eye of football scouts when he impressed in a World Football Group tour for under-9's in 2012, scoring two hat-tricks against Manchester United and Leeds United. Members of Preston North End travelled over to Sydney to watch him and Raffie was invited back to Preston to train with the club.

The family moved over permanently to the UK in 2013 and he had spells with the Academies of Bolton Wanderers and Blackburn Rovers before joining Fleetwood Town in 2014 after a Lancashire youth tournament and a number of trials elsewhere. In 2018, he extended his youth scholarship with Fleetwood having also trained with the first team on a number of occasions and was also on the radar of Australia U17 coach, Trevor Morgan.

== Club career ==
=== Fleetwood Town ===
On 29 April 2021, he signed his first professional contract with Fleetwood Town, signing a deal until the end of the 2022–23 season, with the option of a further year in the clubs favour. He had impressed and been an integral part of the title-winning under-18 side in the previous season and even made his first team debut in October 2020 when he came off the bench for Gerard Garner in the 3–0 win over Aston Villa U21 in the EFL Trophy.

==== 2021–2023: Loans in Northern Ireland ====
On 29 October 2021, it was confirmed that he would join Northern Premier League Premier Division side Bamber Bridge on a short-term loan deal. The move came after he had made his second appearance for Fleetwood's first team at the start of October and he had been a constant feature in Stephen Crainey's Development Squad. On 29 November 2021, he returned to Fleetwood having completed his loan but did enough to impress Brig manager Jamie Milligan in his short time there making multiple appearances.

On 11 December 2021, he dropped down a division when he signed for Northern Premier League Division One West strugglers Kendal Town on a month's loan, as new Kendal chairman, Michael O'Neill, had strong ties with Fleetwood. He made his debut for the Mintcakes in the league clash away at Bootle.

On 25 January 2022, he was back in the NPL Premier Division when he signed for Nantwich Town on a season-long loan. On 15 February 2022, on his birthday, he managed to get a hat-trick of assists in a 5–1 win over Stalybridge Celtic away from home.

On 24 March 2023, he signed for Marine on loan until the end of the season. He was part of the side which won the Liverpool Senior Cup.

At the end of the 2022–23 season, Raffie was released by Fleetwood Town and subsequently joined Portuguese 5th-tier side Espinho. On 24 September 2023, he scored Espinho's third goal in a 4–0 league victory at home to Águeda.

On 24 November 2023, Raffie returned to Nantwich Town on a permanent deal.

== Personal life ==
He is the cousin of former New Zealand Rugby international Sonny Bill Williams. He has a younger brother Keyaan who played for the youth team at Manchester City.

== Career statistics ==
As of match played 22 October 2023

Appearances and goals by club, season and competition
Club	Season	League			National cup		League cup		Other		Total	
Club	Season	Division	Apps	Goals	Apps	Goals	Apps	Goals	Apps	Goals	Apps	Goals
Fleetwood Town	2020–21	League One	0	0	0	0	0	0	1 (Note: Appearance(s) in EFL Trophy)	0	1	0
Fleetwood Town	2021–22	League One	0	0	0	0	0	0	2	0	2	0
Fleetwood Town	2022–23	League One	0	0	0	0	0	0	1	0	1	0
Fleetwood Town	Total		0	0	0	0	0	0	4	0	4	0
Bamber Bridge (loan)	2021–22	NPL Premier Division	2	0	—		—		1 (Note: Appearance(s) in FA Trophy)	0	3	0
Kendal Town (loan)	2021–22	NPL Division One West	7	1	—		—		—		7	1
Nantwich Town (loan)	2021–22	NPL Premier Division	17	2	—		—		1 (Note: Appearance in Cheshire Senior Cup)	0	18	2
Marine (loan)	2022–23	NPL Premier Division	4	0	—		—		1 (Note: Appearance in Liverpool Senior Cup)	0	5	0
Espinho	2023–24	AF Aveiro	5	1	—		—		—		5	1
Nantwich Town	2023–24	NPL Division One West	0	0	—		—		0	0	0	0
Career total			35	4	0	0	0	0	7	0	42	4
