= Alan Kearney =

Irish footballer (b.1987)

Personal information
- Date of birth: 22 September 1987 (age 39)
- Place of birth: Cork, Ireland
- Position: Midfielder

Team information
- Current team: Port Melbourne

Youth career
- Maymount Celtic
- 2003–2005: Everton

Senior career*
Years	Team	Apps	(Gls)
2005–2007	Everton	0	(0)
2006–2007	→ Chester City (loan)	6	(0)
2007	Waterford United	-	(-)
2008	Cobh Ramblers	21	(0)
2010–2013	Southern Stars	62	(9)
2013–2014	South Melbourne	15	(2)
2014	Dandenong Thunder	20	(0)
2015–2017	Port Melbourne	66	(3)
2018	Dandenong City	22	(1)
2019–	Port Melbourne	18	(0)
- * Club domestic league appearances and goals

Alan Kearney (born 11 August 1987) is an Irish footballer who plays in the National Premier Leagues Victoria 2, Australia.

Kearney joined the Everton F.C. academy in 2003 from Maymount Celtic and represented the club at Under 17, Under 18, Under 19 and Reserve level. In February 2007 he joined League Two side Chester City on loan from Everton.

After relocating to Australia, Kearney played for several seasons at Southern Stars FC before joining South Melbourne FC ahead of the 2013 season.

In January 2014 he left South Melbourne FC and signed with Dandenong Thunder and was their vice captain for the 2014 NPL Victoria season. In late 2014, Kearney signed for Port Melbourne Sharks ahead of the 2015 season.

On 2 February 2018 it was announced that Alan had joined Dandenong City for the 2018 season.
