= Melbourne City FC (1990) =

Australian soccer club

Melbourne City
- Full name: Melbourne City Football Club Inc
- Nickname: City
- Founded: 1990; 36 years ago (as Melbourne City Soccer Club)
- Ground: Edwards Reserve
- League: State League Division 4 West
- 2024: 5th of 12
- Website: melbournecityfootballclub.org

Melbourne City Football Club is an Australian amateur soccer club based in the Melbourne suburb of South Kingsville. As of 2026, the club competes in the Victorian State League Division 4 West (VSL 4 West), the seventh tier of soccer in Victoria.

== History ==
Melbourne City was founded in 1990 as Melbourne City Soccer Club after the Argentine community took over Footscray JUST, which had been established by Yugoslav migrants in 1950.

Footscray JUST (known as "Melbourne City JUST" in its final season) had finished in a relegation position at the end of the 1990 Victorian State League season. The newly-formed club did not initially perform any better, with relegation from the newly-formed State League Division 1 at the end of the 1991 season and from Division 2 after a last-placed finish in 1992. Melbourne City avoided further relegation following a tenth-placed Division 3 finish in 1993.

During the 2003 Provisional League Division 1 North-West season, Melbourne City was fined $16,500 and deducted 30 points for fielding a player under the false name of "Leonardo Cagliolo". As a result, the club finished last and was relegated.

In early 2005, the club changed its name to "Melbourne City Football Club". The club won its first premiership in 2015.

=== Legal dispute ===
In January 2014, A-League club Melbourne Heart was acquired by the City Football Group (CFG) and Holding M.S. Australia, leading to media speculation about a potential rebrand of the club. On 5 June 2014, Heart's new name was officially unveiled as "Melbourne City FC".

Following the rebranding, both the A-League club and the State League club sought to trademark "Melbourne City Football Club". In a decision of the Australian Trade Marks Office in 2017 (Melbourne City Football Club Inc v MHFC Holdings Pty Ltd), the A-League club's applied trademark was refused registration.

In 2025, the A-League club partnered with the State League club as part of the "Macca's City Clubs" program for junior soccer teams.

== Honours ==
=== Club ===
Victorian State League 4 West Premiership

- Premiers (1): 2015

== Seasons ==
Season	League									Finals	Dockerty Cup	Top goalscorer		Ref
Season	Division	P	W	D	L	F	A	Pts	Pos	Finals	Dockerty Cup	Name	Goals	Ref
1991	VSL 1	28	7	7	14	33	47	21	13th	—	—			
1992	VSL 2	30	3	10	17	19	57	16	16th	—	—			
1993	VSL 3	28	8	9	11	46	46	25	10th	—	—			
1994	VSL 3	26	7	8	11	25	35	22	9th	—	—			
1995	VSL 3	26	15	3	8	39	29	48	4th	—	—			
1996	VSL 3	26	8	7	11	38	43	31	9th	—	—			
1997	VSL 3	26	16	4	6	60	43	52	2nd	—	—			
1998	VSL 2	26	16	6	4	55	25	54	2nd	—	—			
1999	VSL 1	26	9	3	14	38	48	30	11th	—	—			
2000	VSL 2 NW	22	4	5	13	31	61	17	10th	—	—			
2001	VSL 2 NW	22	1	0	21	7	132	3	12th	—	—			
2002	VSL 3 NW	22	2	6	14	26	56	12	11th	—	—			
2003	PL 1 NW	22	11	3	8	41	32	6	12th	—	—			
2004	PL 2 NW	22	8	5	9	32	36	29	7th	—	—			
2005	PL 2 NW	22	15	2	5	52	32	47	2nd	—	—			
2006	PL 1 NW	22	7	1	14	34	45	22	9th	—	—			
2007	PL 1 NW	22	7	6	9	28	28	27	8th	—	—			
2008	PL 1 NW	22	7	5	10	31	34	26	9th	—	—			
2009	PL 1 NW	22	6	5	11	24	45	23	9th	—	—			
2010	PL 1 NW	22	3	6	13	16	49	15	12th	—	—			
2011	PL 2 NW	22	4	4	14	32	70	16	11th	—	—			
2012	PL 3 NW	22	5	9	8	36	48	24	9th	—	—			
2013	VSL 5 West	22	11	3	8	54	43	36	6th	—	—			
2014	VSL 4 West	22	13	4	5	46	31	43	2nd	—	—			
2015	VSL 4 West	22	13	5	4	53	30	41 (Note: Melbourne City was deducted three points.)	1st	—	—			
2016	VSL 3 NW	22	8	3	11	38	57	27	7th	—	—			
2017	VSL 3 NW	22	0	1	21	10	145	1	12th	—	—			
2018	VSL 4 West	20	4	2	14	24	77	14	10th	—	—			
2019	VSL 4 West	22	5	2	15	29	52	17	10th	—	—			
2020	VSL 4 West	No season due to the COVID-19 pandemic												
2021	VSL 4 West	14	3	6	5	24	27	15	8th	—	—			
2022	VSL 4 West	22	7	4	11	33	59	25	8th	—	—			
2023	VSL 4 West	22	10	4	8	41	32	34	6th	—	—			
2024	VSL 4 West	22	10	4	8	41	46	34	5th	—	Round 1			
2025	VSL 4 West	22	6	4	12	27	51	22	8th	—	Round 2			
2026	VSL 5 NW													
