= Lambros Honos =

Greek Australian footballer

Personal information
- Full name: Lambros Honos
- Date of birth: 16 February 1983 (age 43)
- Place of birth: Melbourne, Australia
- Position: Attacking midfielder

Youth career
- Port Melbourne

Senior career*
Years	Team	Apps	(Gls)
2001	Erani Filiatra		
2002–2005	Kalamata	54	(1)
2005	Egaleo	5	(0)
2006	Niki Volos	32	(1)
2007	Ilisiakos	13	(0)
2008	Kallithea	18	(0)
2009	Korinthos	5	(0)
2009	A.E. Kifisia		
2011	Ethnikos Piraeus		
2012	Oakleigh Cannons	10	(2)
2013–2014	Port Melbourne	38	(5)
2015	Oakleigh Cannons	24	(1)
2016	Port Melbourne	12	(3)
2016–2017	Bentleigh Greens	38	(4)
2018	Northcote City	17	(2)
2019	Oakleigh Cannons	28	(0)
- * Club domestic league appearances and goals as of 30 September 2019

Lambros Honos (Greek: Lampros Chonos, Λάμπρος Χώνος) (born 16 February 1983) is a Greek Australian footballer playing for Bentleigh Greens in the National Premier Leagues Victoria.

== Club career ==
Honos began his career as a junior at Port Melbourne SC before heading to Greece to start his senior career. After several years in the lower divisions, he then joined Egaleo F.C. ahead of the 2005-06 Alpha Ethniki season where he made 5 appearances in the Greek top-flight.

Following this, Honos spent the next three seasons in the Football League (Greece) with Niki Volos F.C., Ilisiakos F.C., Kallithea and Ethnikos Piraeus F.C.

After several more years in lower divisions he returned to Australia in 2012 and trialled with Melbourne Heart Football Club before eventually joining NPL Victoria club Oakleigh Cannons FC during the mid-season transfer window. In 2013 Honos switched to Port Melbourne and polled the second-most votes in the Gold Medal award behind Marijan Cvitkovic. In the final game of the 2014 season, Honos set up a Conor Reddan goal in the final minute to save Port Melbourne from relegation. After returning to Oakleigh for the 2015 season, Honos re-joined Port Melbourne for 2016. In June 2016, Honos made a mid-season switch to Bentleigh Greens SC

== Personal life ==
His older brother John Honos is a goalkeeper and they have previously been teammates at Oakleigh Cannons.
