= Port Melbourne SC =

Port Melbourne
- Full name: Port Melbourne Soccer Club
- Nicknames: The Sharks, Port, New Hellas, Nea Ellas
- Founded: 1968; 58 years ago
- Ground: SS Anderson Reserve
- Capacity: 1,000
- Coach: Adam Inglese
- League: Victoria Premier League 1
- 2026: 13th of 13 (relegated)
- Website: www.portmelbournesharks.com.au
Home colours	Away colours

Port Melbourne SC is an Australian soccer club based in Port Melbourne, a suburb of Melbourne, Victoria. The club was formed in 1968 by local Greek Australians, and was promoted over the years to the Victorian Premier League in 1994. It spent the years 1994–2003 in the Victorian Premier League, winning the minor premiership twice, but was unable to secure the title during its time in the VPL. The club currently competes in the Victoria Premier League 1.

== History ==
The club was formed in 1968 by local Greek Australians. The club spent the majority of its early years in the lower Divisions of Victorian football. From 1973 to 1989, the club competed between Victorian League Division 2 and 3. The club was promoted to Victorian League Division 1 for the first time in 1989, but were relegated back to Division 2 in 1991.

The club then achieved successive promotions in 1992 and 1993 to take Port Melbourne to the Victorian Premier League for the first time in its history in 1994. The club managed to make the finals in its first season in the competition and went all the way to the grand final after wins against Sunshine George Cross and Bulleen Lions, but lost the final to Preston Lions FC. The following year, Port were minor premiers in the VPL for the first time in their history, but successive losses in the finals series meant the season finished on a disappointing note. Port Melbourne made an application to join the NSL ahead of the 1995/96 season however this move was not approved and the club remained in the Victorian system. The club were minor premiers again in 2001, but once more lost the grand final, this time to Heidelberg United FC.

The Sharks were relegated to Victorian State League Division 1 at the end of 2003 season and then again to Victorian State League Division 2 after season 2007. After spending two-years in State 2 South East, the FFV unilaterally decided to place them in Division 2 North West in Season 2010. Eric Vassiliadis was appointed as player-manager and the club was promoted as Champions having lost only one match and having only conceded seven goals all season.

In season 2011 the club lead the league for 21 rounds but failed to gain promotion in the last game of the season where they lost to Pascoe Vale and thus ensured season 2012 will again be played in State League 1. They backed it up in 2012 with an outstanding season, finishing runners up in the State Knockout Cup and went on and secured promotion to the Victorian Premier League for 2013. During the 2012 season, Vassiliadis retired from playing but continued in his role as Manager at the club.

In their first season back in the Victorian top-flight, the Sharks would have qualified for the finals had the league not been compromised by the Southern Stars FC scandal and the club ended 2013 with a 6th-place finish.

In 2014, the first year of the National Premier Leagues system, Port Melbourne were seconds away from relegation until a 95th-minute goal from Conor Reddan in the final game of the season secured a draw against Werribee City, safety for the club and an 11th-place finish.

In 2015, despite several high-profile signings like Alan Kearney, Shaun Kelly, Adrian Zahra and Alan Mulcahy, the Sharks could only manage an 8th-placed finish in the 2015 National Premier Leagues and exited the 2015 FFA Cup at the qualifying stages after a penalty loss to Avondale. There was success at the club on an individual level however, with Kamal Ibrahim winning the 2015 NPL Victoria Gold Medal.

In 2016, Port Melbourne were dealt three blows early on in the transfer window, with Kamal Ibrahim and Nicholas Krousoratis left for NPL rivals, but the club replaced them with the signings of Bonel Obradovic from Northcote City, David Stirton from South Melbourne and welcomed back former player Lambros Honos, who rejoined the club he spent 2013 and 2014 with, after spending a season at Oakleigh Cannons. The 2016 season was a disappointing one for the Sharks, finishing in 10th place in the league and exiting the FFA Cup in qualifying, losing to Melbourne Knights. After the final round, head coach Eric Vassiliadis resigned from his post.

Port announced 2016 Bulleen Lions' coach Dom Barba as Vassiliadis' replacement. Following an 11th-place finish in 2017, the club parted ways with Barba and appointed Adam Piddick who previously coached in the National Premier Leagues Queensland. The Sharks finished in 6th place in 2018, qualifying for the finals series but lost 3–1 to Avondale in the elimination final.

== SS Anderson Reserve ==
The home of the Port Melbourne Sharks is the SS Anderson Reserve, also known by the tag JL Murphy Reserve, located in Port Melbourne, Victoria.

Over the years the club has developed and expanded its facilities into one of the best in the inner city. The facilities are considered of sufficient standard to warrant being used as training facilities for both the Commonwealth and Olympic Games. The facilities also received an upgrade for use as a training venue for the 2015 AFC Asian Cup.

== Players ==
=== Current squad ===
As of 14 February 2025

Note: Flags indicate national team as defined under FIFA eligibility rules; some limited exceptions apply. Players may hold more than one non-FIFA nationality.

No.	Pos.	Nation	Player
1	GK	AUS	Alex Kondoleon
2	DF	AUS	Marc Latsis
3	FW	AUS	Owen McCloskey
6	MF	AUS	Anthony Leban
7	FW	AUS	Delarno Pharoe
8	MF	SSD	Maker Maker
9	FW	AUS	Aiden Brown
10	MF	AUS	Nicholas Dib
13	DF	AUS	Amanhomm Khamis
14	FW	AUS	Alec Becvinovski
16	DF	AUS	Jonathan Vakirtzis

No.	Pos.	Nation	Player
17	FW	AUS	Nikita Cicmil
19	MF	AUS	Thomas Alisandratos
20	FW	AUS	Joshua Markovski
22	DF	AUS	Daniel Serra
23	MF	AUS	Luka Romic
80	DF	AUS	Nathan Dib
—	FW	AUS	Liston Diaz
—	DF	ALG	Riade Mouyette
—	MF	AUS	Mitch Trajcevski
—	MF	AUS	Emanuel Vakrinos

== Club honours ==
- Victorian Premier League/NPL Victoria Minor Premiers – 1995, 2001
- Victorian State League Division 1 Champions – 1993, Runners Up 2012
- Victorian State League Division 2 Champions – 2010
- Victorian State League Division 3 Champions – 1977, 1987
- Hellenic Cup Champions – 1994, 1995
- Dockerty Cup Runner up – 2012

== Individual honours ==
Victorian Premier League Coach of the Year

- 1994 – Takis Svigos
- 2001 – Harry Chalkitis

PS4 NPL Gold Medal

- 1995 – George Svigos
- 2015 – Kamal Ibrahim

Victorian Premier League Golden Boot

- 1994 – Peter Psarros
- 1995 – Nick Tsaltas
- 1999 – Peter Kakos
- 2001 – Peter Psarros

Jimmy Rooney Medal – VPL Grand Final Man of the Match

- 2001 – Peter Psarros

Bill Fleming Medal – Media Player Of The Year

- 1995 – George Svigos
