= Bentleigh Greens SC =

Australian soccer club in Melbourne

Bentleigh Greens
- Full name: Bentleigh Greens Soccer Club
- Nicknames: The Greens; Pankyprio (Pan-Cyprian)
- Short name: BGSC
- Founded: 1987
- Ground: Kingston Heath Soccer Complex
- Capacity: 3,300
- Coordinates: 37°58′7″S 145°5′27″E
- Chairman: Ray Georgiou
- Coach: Vacant
- League: NPL Victoria
- 2026: 12th of 14 (relegated)
- Website: www.bentleighgreens.com.au
Home colours	Away colours

Bentleigh Greens Soccer Club is an Australian semi professional soccer club based in Cheltenham, a suburb of Melbourne, Victoria. The club was formed in 1986, by the Greek Cypriot community and currently competes in the Victoria Premier League 1. Bentleigh made nationwide headlines when it became the first club below the A-League to make the semi-final of the FFA Cup in 2014. The Greens hit another milestone a year later when they claimed their first major trophy, the NPL Victoria title. In 2016, Bentleigh Greens became Victorian top-flight league premiers for the first time.

== History ==
Former Bentleigh Greens logo

=== Formation and early years ===
In 1986, a small group of former members of Cypriot Community's Soccer Club, Central City, met at 15–17 Heffernan Lane. This group determined to create a strong Greek Cypriot based team in Melbourne. There were two previous failed attempts, one in the mid-1950s and secondly Central City from 1977 to 1983 which ran under the control of the Cyprus Community of Melbourne and Victoria from 1977 to 1980.

The "Founders" at this initial meeting were Michael Christopher, Ray Georgiou, Andrew Nicolaou, Michael Iaonnou, Harry Theocharous, Phillip Philippou, Tony Antoniou and Harry Constantinou. After making a huge fund raising effort and gathering together 150 foundation members they were able to take over Greensborough SC and move it to Victory Park in the City of Moorabbin. The name of the club was changed to Bentleigh Greens. The green colours were retained.

=== Rise to the Victorian Premier League ===
The club competed in the First Division of the Provisional League in 1987 season. That year the club finished runners up to Chelsea on goal difference, achieving promotion to Victorian League Division 4. The club was promoted to Division 3 in 1989 after a second-place finish, after just two years in Division 4. Bentleigh amazingly were promoted to Division 2 in 1990, having just been promoted to Division 3 that year. Two more promotions followed in 1993 and 1995, taking the Greens from Division 2 to the Victorian Premier League for the first time in the club's history. The 1995 promotion was the fifth promotion for the club in nine years, marking a very impressive rise through the ranks of Victorian football for the recently established Bentleigh side.

Bentleigh went into their first ever VPL campaign under the management of Harry Chalkitis, managing a fourth-place finish and qualifying for the finals series. The Greens met Green Gully SC in the elimination final, but went down 3–1. The following campaign was even stronger for Bentleigh, finishing runners-up in the regular season, finishing just two points behind winners Altona Magic, but then lost 4–1 to Green Gully in the qualifying final and 2–1 to Bulleen Inter Kings in the semi-final to crash out. Mark Bresciano scored the winner for Bulleen Inter that day.

Bentleigh were relegated in 2005, going down to the Victorian State League Division 1 for the first time since 1995. The side finished bottom of the league, managing just 16 points in 26 games. The Greens narrowly avoided successive relegations, finishing 10th in a 12 team league with the bottom two going down. The side finished just three points above the relegated Northcote City FC. Bentleigh were promoted back to the top flight in 2009, finishing second with 41 points. The side would have missed out on promotion and finished third had St Albans Saints not been deducted nine points that season. In their first season back in the top flight, the Greens finished in 10th place, one above relegation.

Bentleigh made the VPL grand final in 2013, finishing third in the regular season. On their way to the final, Bentleigh beat Melbourne Knights FC 4–2 and then Northcote City 2–1, but lost to Northcote City in the grand final 3–2 in extra time.

=== 2014–2015: FFA Cup run and first major title ===
The club made nationwide headlines after making it to the semi-final of the inaugural FFA Cup in 2014. The Greens beat Blacktown City 1–0 in the Round of 32, Sydney Olympic 2–1 in the Round of 16, Adelaide City 2–1 in the quarter-finals before going down 3–0 to A-League side Perth Glory. The match against Adelaide City was played in front of almost 2,000 people at Kingston Heath Soccer Complex, while the match against Perth Glory drew a reported 3,300 people. Bentleigh brought in a number of high-profile players for the 2015 season, including the likes of Daniel Visevic, Steven Topalovic and Queensland trio Troy Ruthven, Matt Thurtell and Chris Lucas. The season hit a major snag when the Greens were knocked out of the 2015 FFA Cup in the qualifying stages by the unfancied Ballarat Red Devils but ended in fine style with the club winning its first-ever major title when it beat South Melbourne at Lakeside Stadium in the Grand Final, 3–1 after extra time. Bentleigh finished runners-up to South Melbourne in the regular season, missing out on the minor and major double on goal difference.

=== 2016—present: More silverware ===
The Greens secured reigning NPL Victoria Gold Medal winner Kamal Ibrahim, but lost key first-team players Steven Topalovic, Daniel Visevic and Alastair Bray, with Bray signing for A-League side Central Coast Mariners. Bentleigh kicked off season 2016 by claiming the FFV Community Shield, beating South Melbourne at Kingston Heath 3–0. Bentleigh again met rivals South Melbourne at the final qualifying stage for the 2016 FFA Cup. The Greens would go on to smash their opponents 4–0, sending the side through to the national stage of the Cup competition. In August, Bentleigh took out the 2016 Dockerty Cup, the second major trophy in its history and first Dockerty Cup title, with a 1–0 victory over Green Gully at ABD Stadium in Broadmeadows, with Ryan Paczkowski scoring and Ryan Scott delivering an outstanding performance in goals. Just four days later, the Greens picked up their third piece of silverware for 2016, winning the NPL Victoria minor premiership for the first time in its history.

Bentleigh were drawn against Adelaide-based side North Eastern MetroStars in the Round of 32 of the FFA Cup in 2016, winning on penalties, with the game tied at 2–2 after 90 minutes and 3–3 after extra time. Bentleigh were drawn away from home against Tasmanian side Devonport City in the Round of 16. Battling torrential rain and a stubborn Strikers side, it took extra time for Bentleigh to win through to the quarter-finals, with Matthew Thurtell scoring the game's lone goal in front of 3,000 fans at Valley Road. In the quarter-finals, Bentleigh was paired with reigning Cup holders and A-League heavyweights Melbourne Victory. Two second half goals to the A-League side saw it win out 2–0 in front of 3,754 people at Kingston Heath, a record crowd for the venue. After the clash, iconic captain Wayne Wallace announce his departure from the club after six years of service.

In preparation for the 2017 season, Bentleigh lost Kamal Ibrahim to Avondale FC and Liam McCormick to South Melbourne. However, the club exercised its muscle and added former A-League duo Ben Litfin and Andy Brennan. After a fourth-placed league finish, Bentleigh secured its second NPL Championship in three years when it beat Heidelberg United 2-1 after extra time in the Grand Final, with Ross Honos scoring in the 106th minute to win the tie. Goalkeeper Ryan Scott took out the Jim Rooney Medal, awarded to the best player on the pitch.

Bentleigh became the 6th member federation side in FFA Cup history to knock out an A-League opponent when it beat Wellington Phoenix FC 1–0 at Kingston Heath in August 2018. Bentleigh beat Broadmeadow Magic 4–0 at Magic Park in the Round of 16 and Heidelberg 1–0 in the quarter-finals to set up another clash with A League opposition, this time Adelaide United. A goal in either half saw the Reds come away from Melbourne with a 2–0 win. In the league, the Greens finished a point off top spot, but lost 4–3 to Avondale in the semi-final.

In January 2019, new A-League team Western United FC announced that Bentleigh head coach John Anastasiadis would join the club as an assistant coach. Anastasiadis' last game in charge was an NPL Victoria Round 13 victory over the previously undefeated Avondale, propelling the Greens to second spot on the table. John Gabrielson was appointed as the new head coach after Anastasiadis' departure. Gabrielson's tenure proved to be short-lived, with Frank McGrellis taking over in July 2019. After Kingston City's relegation from the NPL Victoria was confirmed, Kingston's coach Nick Tolios was confirmed as the new Bentleigh Greens coach, mid-way through the 2019 NPL Victoria finals series. Tolios led the Greens to a 2–1 victory over premiers Heidelberg and a penalty shoot-out win over Avondale in the NPL Victoria Grand Final at AAMI Park to make it three championships in five years for the Cheltenham-based club.

For 2023 Season, Bentleigh Greens made the direction to appoint Alfredo Costantino as the club's first-ever full-time senior coach. Following an extensive process in which the club was inundated with applications, the Greens have welcomed Alfredo to the club. A UEFA A-Licensed coach, Alfredo arrived at the Greens with a wealth of coaching experiences. In his time within the Victorian football system, he has coached teams to a league title and several promotions.

"The Bentleigh Greens are excited to announce Riccardo Marchioli as our new Senior Men’s Head Coach. Marchioli arrives at the club fresh out of the A-Leagues Men’s competition, where he was assistant coach to Newcastle Jets Head Coach Arthur Papas, a role he took on after an extremely successful period as the Jets A-League youth head coach".

== Current squad ==
As 1 July, 2026 Note: Flags indicate national team as defined under FIFA eligibility rules; some limited exceptions apply. Players may hold more than one non-FIFA nationality.

No.	Pos.	Nation	Player
1	GK	AUS	Brendan White
2	DF	AUS	Marc Latsis
3	DF	JPN	Keiji Kagiyama
4	DF	NZL	Scott Hilliar
5	DF	AUS	Alex Hird
6	MF	AUS	Leigh Broxham
7	MF	AUS	Maki Petratos
8	MF	SEN	Mohamed Aidara
9	FW	AUS	Dennis Menelaou
10	FW	ENG	Anthony Lynn
11	MF	SSD	Manyumow Achol
12	DF	AUS	Deion Nikolaidis

No.	Pos.	Nation	Player
14	FW	AUS	Anthony Frangie
15	MF	ROU	Mario Boldea
17	FW	AUS	Patrick Hogan
20	GK	AUS	Ahmad Taleb
22	DF	AUS	Michael Boffey
27	MF	AFG	Jawad Rezai
28	FW	ARG	Alan Gerez
30	MF	AUS	Luke Oresti
47	MF	AUS	Dimitri Rellos
68	DF	AUS	Kalilou Kamara
—	DF	AUS	Nathan Dib

== Honours ==
- National Premier Leagues Victoria
  - Champions: 2015, 2017, 2019
- National Premier Leagues Victoria
  - Premiers: 2016
- Victorian Premier League
  - Finalists: 1996, 1997, 2001, 2002, 2019
- Victorian State League Division 1
  - Champions: 1995
- Victorian State League Division 2
  - Runners-up: 1993
- Victorian State League Division 3
  - Runners-up: 1990
- Victorian State League Division 4
  - Runners-up: 1989
- Dockerty Cup
  - Champions: 2016, 2018, 2022
- Dockerty Cup
  - Runners-up: 2017
- FV Community Shield
  - Champions: 2016, 2017, 2019, 2020
- Hellenic Cup
  - Champions: 1991, 1996, 1997, 2002, 2003

== Individual honours ==
- Victorian Premier League Player of the Year Award

1996 – Ike Alagiozidis

2002 – Jim Kourtis

- Bill Fleming Medal

1996 – Ike Alagiozidis

- Victorian Premier League Coach of the Year Award

1997 – Harry Chalkitis

- Victorian Premier League Leading Goalscorer Award

2002 – Juan Nilo

- Victorian Premier League Goalkeeper of the Year Award

2002 – Jim Kourtis

- Victorian Premier League Under 21 Player of the Year Award

1996 – Vlad Babic

== Competition timeline ==
Season	League											NPL Playoffs	Cup		
Season	Division	Pld	W	D	L	GF	GA	+/-	Pts	Position	Finals	NPL Playoffs	FFA Cup	FFV Dockerty Cup	FFV Community Shield
2014	NPL V	26	12	7	7	48	35	13	43	4th	Not contested	DNQ	Semi-finalist	Semi-finalist	Not contested
2015	NPL V	26	17	7	2	48	25	23	58	2nd	Champion	DNQ	Round 5	5th round	DNQ
2016	NPL V	26	18	5	3	61	22	39	59	1st	Semi-finalist	Quarter-finalist	Quarter-finalist	Winner	Winner
2017	NPL V	26	13	7	6	44	30	14	46	4th	Champion	DNQ	Round of 16	Runner-Up	Winner
2018	NPL V	26	18	4	4	53	28	25	58	2nd	Semi-finalist	DNQ	Semi-finalist	Winner	Runner-Up
2019	NPL V	26	13	4	9	47	45	2	43	5th	Champion	DNQ	Round 6	Round 7	Winner
