= Jawad Rezai =

Afghan-Australian footballer (born 2001)

Personal information
- Full name: Jawad Rezai
- Date of birth: 24 August 2001 (age 25)
- Place of birth: Perth, Australia
- Height: 1.72 m (5 ft 8 in)
- Position: Midfielder

Team information
- Current team: Marconi Stallions

Senior career*
Years	Team	Apps	(Gls)
-2021	Perth SC		
2021	Balcatta FC		
2021	Floreat Athena		
2021–2022	Hamborn 07		
2022–2023	Floreat Athena		
2023–2024	Hume City	23	(6)
2024	Altona Magic	18	(5)
2024–2025	Preston Lions	1	(0)
2025–	Marconi Stallions	0	(0)

International career^{‡}
2023–	Afghanistan	1	(0)
- * Club domestic league appearances and goals as of 11 August 2024 ‡ National team caps and goals as of 22 July 2024

Jawad Rezai (born 24 August 2001) is an Afghan-Australian association football player who currently plays for Marconi Stallions in the National Premier Leagues NSW, and Afghanistan.

== Early life ==
One of six children, Rezai was born in Australia after his parents fled their hometown of Daykundi Province in Afghanistan.

== Career ==
Rezai has played for several clubs throughout Australia in Victoria and Perth, including Altona Magic

== International career ==
Rezai was called up to the Afghanistan senior squad by Ashley Westwood for the 2026 World Cup Qualification match against Kuwait. Despite being a second-half substitute, Afghanistan would go down 0–4.
