= 2017 Dockerty Cup =

2017 FFV Dockerty Cup
Tournament details
- Country: Australia
- Teams: 217

Final positions
- Champions: Heidelberg United
- Runners-up: Bentleigh Greens

The 2017 Dockerty Cup was a football (soccer) knockout-cup competition held between men's clubs in Victoria, Australia in 2017, the annual edition of the Dockerty Cup. Victorian soccer clubs from the 5 State League Divisions, regional, metros and masters leagues - plus the 12 Clubs from the National Premier Leagues Victoria - competed for the Dockerty Cup trophy.

The competition also served as Qualifying Rounds for the 2017 FFA Cup. In addition to the two Victorian A-League clubs, the four semi-finalists qualified for the final rounds of the 2017 FFA Cup, entering at the Round of 32.

== Format ==
Round	Clubs remaining	Winners from previous round	New entries this round	Main Match Dates
First Qualifying Round	217	none	18	10–12 February
Second Qualifying Round	208	9	47	17–18 February
Round 1	180	28	60	25–28 February
Round 2	136	44	36	3–6 March
Round 3	96	40	24	11–13 March
Round 4	64	32	32	17–19 March
Round 5	32	32	none	28 March-13 April
Round 6	16	16	none	25 April-4 May
Round 7	8	8	none	23–24 May
Semi-Finals	4	4	none	21–22 June
Final	2	2	none	5 July

== Prize fund ==
The prize fund for the 2017 event is detailed below.

Round	No. of Clubs receive fund	Prize fund
Semi-finalists	2	$2,500
Runner-up	1	$5,000
Champion	1	$10,000
Total		$20,000

== Preliminary rounds ==
Victorian clubs, participated in the 2017 FFA Cup via the preliminary rounds. This was open to teams from the National Premier Leagues Victoria, Victorian State League divisions, regional and metros leagues. Teams were seeded in terms of which round they would enter based on their division in 2017.

The four qualifiers for the semi-final rounds were:

Semi Finalists and FFA Cup Qualifiers
Bentleigh Greens (2)	Heidelberg United (2)	Hume City (2)	South Melbourne (2)

== Semi finals ==
A total of four teams took part in this stage of the competition, with the matches played on 21 June and 22 June.

Tie no	Home team (tier)	Score	Away team (tier)
1	Heidelberg United (2)	5–0	Hume City (2)
2	South Melbourne (2)	0–2	Bentleigh Greens (2)

== Final ==
5 July 2017	Heidelberg United (2)	1–1 (a.e.t.) (5–4 p)	Bentleigh Greens (2)	ABD Stadium
	Athiu 75'		Hatzimouratis 51'
