= 2012 FFV State Knockout Cup =

Tournament details
- Teams: 130

The 2012 FFV State Knockout Cup was the second edition of a football (soccer) knockout-cup competition held between men's clubs in Victoria, Australia in 2012, the annual edition of the Dockerty Cup.

== Teams ==
Round	Clubs remaining	Clubs involved	Winners from previous round	New entries this round	Leagues/Teams entering at this round
Zone Playoffs	130	104	none	104	Victorian State League Division 2 Victorian State League Division 3 Victorian Provisional Leagues; Victorian Metropolitan Leagues; Regional Leagues
Zone Semi-finals	48	48	24	24	Victorian Premier League; Victorian State League Division 1
Zone Finals	24	24	24	none	none
Super 12	12	12	12	none	none
Round of 6	6	6	6	none	none
Semi-Finals	4	4	4	none	none
Final	2	2	2	none	none

== First Round Playoffs ==
Round 1 will contain clubs below State League 1. Clubs will play teams in their Zones and some teams will have a bye which automatically puts them into the second round. The draw was held on 2 March 2011 at 6pm AEDT.

North-Eastern Draw

10 Mar	Eltham Redbacks	2–7	Box Hill United	Clifton Park
19:00 AEDT

10 Mar	Old Trinity Grammarians	3–0	Manningham	State Football Centre – Pitch 1
17:00 AEDT

10 Mar	Doncaster Rovers	2–2 (a.e.t.) (6–5 p)	Old Scotch	White Eagles Stadium
15:00 AEDT

10 Mar	Ashburton United	3–1	Whitehorse United Seniors	Knox Regional Football Centre – Pitch 1
15:00 AEDT

10 Mar	Old Carey	0–1	Nunawading City	Knox Regional Football Centre – Pitch 1
14:00 AEDT

Riversdale	v	Bye

Old Xaverians	v	Bye

Old Camberwell Grammarians	v	Bye

Central Draw

10 Mar	Collingwood City	4–0	Albert Park	State Football Centre – Pitch 3
19:00 AEDT

10 Mar	Melbourne Lions	0–3	South Yarra	State Football Centre – Pitch 2
17:00 AEDT

10 Mar	Malvern City	5–3	Melbourne Tornado	State Football Centre – Pitch 2
15:00 AEDT

10 Mar	Middle Park	3–1	Elwood City	State Football Centre – Pitch 3
15:00 AEDT

10 Mar	Old Melburnians	1–2	Melbourne University	State Football Centre – Pitch 2
19:30 AEDT

Yarraville	v	Bye

St Kilda	v	Bye

Clifton Hill	v	Bye

Southern Draw

10 Mar	Frankston Pines	0–3	Peninsula Strikers	Monterey Reserve – Pitch 1
15:00 AEDT

10 Mar	Parkmore	3–0	Springvale City	Parkmore Soccer Club
15:00 AEDT

10 Mar	Berwick City	4–1	Sandown Lions	Jack Thomas Reserve – Pitch 1
15:00 AEDT

10 Mar	Skye United	2–4	Mornington	Dallas Brooks Park – Pitch 1
15:00 AEDT

Heatherton United	v	Bye

Casey Cornets	v	Bye

Keysborough	v	Bye

Seaford United	v	Bye

Western Draw

10 Mar	Westvale	5–2	Cairnlea	McKechnie Reserve – Pitch 2
15:00 AEDT

10 Mar	North Sunshine Eagles	5–0	Brimbank Stallions	Club Italia Sporting Club – Pitch 1
15:00 AEDT

10 Mar	Williamstown	3–5	Melton Phoenix	MacPherson Park
15:00 AEDT

Western Eagles	v	Bye

Altona North	v	Bye

Keilor Park	v	Bye

Hoppers Crossing	v	Bye

Truganina	v	Bye

Wimmera South Coast Draw

10 Mar	Corio	1–7	Ballarat Red Devils	Hume Reserve – Pitch 1
15:00 AEDT

10 Mar	Surf Coast	0–2	Sebastopol Vikings	Banyul Warri Reserve
15:00 AEDT

Bell Park	v	Bye

Geelong Rangers	v	Bye

Breakwater Eagles	v	Bye

Ballarat North United	v	Bye

Warrnambool Wolves	v	Bye

Lara Soccer Club	v	Bye

Gippsland Draw

The 2012 Battle of Britain Cup, the local Knockout Tournament in the Gippsland Region, acted as the qualifying for this region of the tournament, with the two finalists advancing to the Zone Playoffs regardless of the result of the Battle of Britain Cup Final.

18 Mar	Newborough-Yallourn United	0–2	Sale United	Burrage Reserve
15:00 AEDT

18 Mar	Moe United	3–2	Tyers	Tyers Recreation Reserve
15:00 AEDT

Fortuna 60	v	Bye

Churchill United	v	Bye

Traralgon City	v	Bye

Monash	v	Bye

Falcons 2000	v	Bye

Traralgon Olympians	v	Bye

The North-Western, Northern, Eastern, South-Eastern and Goulburn North-East draws did not begin until Round 2.

== Second Round Playoffs ==
North-Eastern Draw

16 Mar	Old Trinity Grammarians	0–2	Old Camberwell Grammarians	State Football Centre – Pitch 2
20:00 AEDT

17 Mar	Box Hill United	2–4 (a.e.t.)	Doncaster Rovers	State Football Centre – Pitch 1
13:30 AEDT

17 Mar	Nunawading City	3–0	Old Xaverians	Knox Regional Football Centre – Pitch 1
16:30 AEDT

17 Mar	Ashburton United	0–4	Riversdale	State Football Centre – Pitch 2
11:00 AEDT

Central Draw

17 Mar	St Kilda	2–1	Clifton Hill	State Football Centre – Pitch 2
16:00 AEDT

17 Mar	Melbourne University	0–2	Malvern City	State Football Centre – Pitch 3
16:30 AEDT

17 Mar	Middle Park	5–3	Collingwood City	State Football Centre – Pitch 1
16:00 AEDT

17 Mar	Yarraville	2–0	South Yarra	State Football Centre – Pitch 1
11:00 AEDT

Southern Draw

17 Mar	Parkmore	0–1	Seaford United	Parkmore Soccer Club
15:00 AEDT

17 Mar	Heatherton United	5–0	Keysborough	Bosnia and Herzegovina Centre – Pitch 1
15:00 AEDT

17 Mar	Berwick City	2–1	Casey Comets	Jack Thomas Reserve – Pitch 1
15:00 AEDT

17 Mar	Peninsula Strikers	3–2	Mornington	Centenary Park
15:00 AEDT

Western Draw

17 Mar	Westvale	5–4	North Sunshine Eagles	McKechnie Reserve – Pitch 2
15:00 AEDT

17 Mar	Hoppers Crossing	9–1	Truganina	Grange Reserve – Pitch 2
15:00 AEDT

17 Mar	Keilor Park	5–0	Melton Phoenix	Keilor Park Recreation Reserve – Pitch 1
15:00 AEDT

17 Mar	Western Eagles	2–3	Altona North	Polish Sports & Recreation Complex – Pitch 1
15:00 AEDT

Wimmera South Coast Draw

17 Mar	Breakwater Eagles	1–3	Sebastopol Vikings	White Eagle House
15:00 AEDT

17 Mar	Ballarat North United	3–0	Bell Park	Bell Park Sports Club – Pitch 1
15:00 AEDT

17 Mar	Geelong Rangers	5–2	Warrnambool Wolves	Myers Reserve
15:00 AEDT

17 Mar	Lara	1–6	Ballarat Red Devils	Mill Road
15:00 AEDT

North-Western Draw

17 Mar	Sunbury United Seniors	3–0	Avondale Heights	Langama Park – Pitch 1
15:00 AEDT

17 Mar	Essendon Royals	5–1	Northern Roosters	Reggio Calabria Club
15:00 AEDT

17 Mar	Flemington Eagles	0–3	FC Strathmore	State Football Centre – Pitch 2
13:30 AEDT

17 Mar	Moreland City	8–1	Moreland United	Moomba Park
15:00 AEDT

Northern Draw

17 Mar	La Trobe University	3–3 (a.e.t.) (4–3 p)	Heidelberg Eagles	La Trobe University Lower Playing Field – Pitch 1
15:00 AEDT

17 Mar	Bundoora United	2–3	Watsonia Heights	Harvest Home Road Reserve – Pitch 1
15:00 AEDT

Diamond Valley	v	Bye

Heidelberg Stars	v	Bye

Eastern Draw

17 Mar	Ringwood City	0–4	Eastern Lions	Jubilee Park
15:00 AEDT

17 Mar	Brandon Park	5–2	Croydon City Arrows	Freeway Reserve – Pitch 1
15:00 AEDT

Mooroolbark Seniors	v	Bye

Monbulk Rangers	v	Bye

South-Eastern Draw

18 Mar	Bayside Argonauts	1–2	North Caulfield Seniors	Veneto Club – David Barro Stadium
19:00 AEDT

17 Mar	Caulfield United Cobras	1–1 (a.e.t.) (8–9 p)	Kingston City	The Grange Reserve
15:00 AEDT

Sandringham	v	Bye

Caulfield Grammarians	v	Bye

Goulburn North-East Draw

24 Mar	Twin City Wanderers	3–0	Kialla United	John McEwen Reserve
19:00 AEDT		Kialla United Withdrew from Competition

24 Mar	Cobram	1–3	Cobram Victory	John McEwen Reserve
13:00 AEDT

24 Mar	Shepparton	3–7	Wodonga Diamonds	John McEwen Reserve
16:00 AEDT

Gippsland Draw

24 Mar	Fortuna 60	4–3	Moe United	Crinigan Road South Reserve
20:00 AEDT

24 Mar	Churchill United	4–0	Sale United	Hazelwood South Reserve 1
20:00 AEDT

25 Mar	Monash	2–3	Falcons 2000	Monash Reserve
15:00 AEDT

25 Mar	Traralgon City	0–3	Traralgon Olympians	Traralgon City Harold Preston Reserve
15:00 AEDT

== Third Round Playoffs ==
North-Eastern Draw

24 Mar	Riversdale	2–1	Doncaster Rovers	Gardiners Creek Reserve – Pitch 1
15:00 AEDT

23 Mar	Old Camberwell Grammarians	2–1	Nunawading City	Olympic Park
20:00 AEDT

Central Draw

24 Mar	Yarraville	1–0	Middle Park	State Football Centre – Pitch 2
16:00 AEDT

24 Mar	Malvern City	2–0	St Kilda	State Football Centre – Pitch 2
13:30 AEDT

Southern Draw

24 Mar	Seaford United	0–6	Berwick City	North Seaford Reserve – Pitch 1
15:00 AEDT

24 Mar	Peninsula Strikers	2–1	Heatherton United	Centenary Park
15:00 AEDT

Western Draw

24 Mar	Altona North	0–6	Hoppers Crossing	Grange Reserve – Pitch 2
15:00 AEDT

24 Mar	Keilor Park	2–1	Westvale	Keilor Park Recreation Reserve – Pitch 1
15:00 AEDT

North-Western Draw

24 Mar	Essendon Royals	0–2	Sunbury United	Reggio Calabria Club
15:00 AEDT

24 Mar	Moreland City	7–1	FC Strathmore	State Football Centre – Pitch 1
16:00 AEDT

Wimmera South Coast Draw

24 Mar	Ballarat Red Devils	10–1	Ballarat North United	Trekardo Park
15:00 AEDT

24 Mar	Sebastopol Vikings	1–3	Geelong Rangers	St Georges Reserve
13:00 AEDT

Northern Draw

24 Mar	Heidelberg Stars	0–1	Diamond Valley	Cartledge Reserve – Pitch 1
15:00 AEDT

24 Mar	La Trobe University	2–0	Watsonia Heights	La Trobe University Lower Playing Field – Pitch 1
15:00 AEDT

Eastern Draw

24 Mar	Brandon Park	1–3	Eastern Lions	Freeway Reserve – Pitch 1
15:00 AEDT

24 Mar	Mooroolbark	2–5	Monbulk Rangers	Esther Park Reserve
15:00 AEDT

South-Eastern Draw

24 Mar	Caulfield Grammarians	0–8	Kingston City	The Grange Reserve
15:00 AEDT

25 Mar	North Caulfield	2–0	Sandringham	Veneto Club – David Barro Stadium
19:00 AEDT

Goulburn North-East Draw

10 Apr	Wodonga Diamonds	1–3	Cobram Victory	Diamonds on La Trobe
20:00 AEST

TBA	Twin City Wanderers	v	Shepparton United
TBC

Gippsland Draw

31 Mar	Fortuna 60	2–3	Falcons 2000	Crinigan Road South Reserve
20:00 AEDT

1 Apr	Churchill United	2–1	Traralgon Olympians	Hazelwood South Reserve 1
16:00 AEDT

== Zone Semi-Finals ==
This round will see the 12 teams from the Victorian Premier League and the 12 teams from the Victorian State League Division 1 enter the competition, alongside the 22 winners from the previous round. Two teams from the Loddon-Mallee region – Mildura City and Castlemaine Goldfields – entered the competition at this stage, without needing to qualify through preliminary matches. The Draw for this round took place on 10 April.

28 Apr	Moreland City	0–1 (a.e.t.)	Hume City	Campbell Reserve
14:00 AEST

28 Apr	Pascoe Vale	2–0	Sunbury United	Hosken Reserve
14:00 AEST

28 Apr	Northcote City	0–1	Morwell Pegasus	John Cain Memorial Park – Pitch 1
15:00 AEST

28 Apr	Riversdale	0–4	Old Camberwell Grammarians	Frog Hollow Reserve
14:00 AEST

28 Apr	Altona Magic	2–1	Eastern Lions	Paisley Park Soccer Complex – Pitch 1
14:00 AEST

28 Apr	Oakleigh Cannons	4–1	Monbulk Rangers	Jack Edwards Reserve – Pitch 1
14:00 AEST

28 Apr	South Melbourne	2–1	Malvern City	John Cain Memorial Park – Pitch 1
12:30 AEST

28 Apr	Port Melbourne	6–0	Yarraville	SS Anderson Oval – Pitch 1
14:00 AEST

28 Apr	Hoppers Crossing	1–3	Keilor Park	Grange Reserve – Pitch 1
14:00 AEST

28 Apr	Green Gully Cavaliers	3–1	St Albans Saints	Green Gully Reserve – Pitch 1
14:00 AEST

28 Apr	Peninsula Strikers	1–3	Dandenong Thunder	Centenary Park
14:00 AEST

28 Apr	Springvale White Eagles	3–1	Berwick City	Serbian Sports Centre – Pitch 1
15:00 AEST

28 Apr	Mildura City	3–0	Castlemaine Goldfields	Stadium TBC
15:00 AEST

28 Apr	Sunshine George Cross	2–0	Richmond	Chaplin Reserve
14:00 AEST

28 Apr	Falcons 2000	0–3	Western Suburbs	Latrobe City Sports Stadium
14:00 AEST

28 Apr	Southern Stars	3–0	Churchill United	Kingston Heath Soccer Complex – Pitch 1
14:00 AEST

9 Jun	Moreland Zebras	v	Shepparton United	Epping Soccer Stadium
15:00 AEST

9 Jun	Werribee City	2–3 (a.e.t.)	Cobram Victory	Arndell Park Reserve – Pitch 3
15:00 AEST

28 Apr	Ballarat Red Devils	2–0	North Geelong Warriors	Trekardo Park
14:00 AEST

29 Apr	Melbourne Knights	8–2	Geelong Rangers	Knights Stadium – Pitch 1
15:30 AEST

29 Apr	North Caulfield	0–2	Bentleigh Greens	Caulfield Park
14:00 AEST

28 Apr	Kingston City	0–2	Dandenong City	The Grange Reserve
14:00 AEST

28 Apr	Whittlesea Ranges	1–2	Diamond Valley	Partridge Street Reserve – Pitch 1
14:00 AEST

28 Apr	La Trobe University	0–5	Heidelberg United	La Trobe University Lower Playing Field – Pitch 1
14:00 AEST

== Zone Finals ==
The draw for this round took place on 9 May.

8 June	South Melbourne	1–2	Port Melbourne	Lakeside Stadium
20:00 AEST

11 June	Oakleigh Cannons	1–2	Altona Magic	Jack Edwards Reserve
16:30 AEST

9 June	Morwell Pegasus	3–0	Old Camberwell Grammarians	Ronald Reserve
14:00 AEST

9 June	Pascoe Vale	5–0	Hume City	Hosken Reserve
14:00 AEST

9 June	Diamond Valley United	2–4	Heidelberg United	Partingtons Flat
14:00 AEST

9 June	Dandenong City	1–2	Bentleigh Greens	Frank Holohan Soccer Complex
14:00 AEST

9 June	Dandenong Thunder	10–1	Springvale White Eagles	George Andrews Reserve
14:00 AEST

9 June	Green Gully Cavaliers	2–1 (a.e.t.)	Keilor Park	Green Gully Reserve
14:00 AEST

9 June	Ballarat Red Devils	0–1	Melbourne Knights	Trekardo Park
14:00 AEST

TBA	Western Suburbs	v	Southern Stars	Ralph Reserve
TBC

9 June	Sunshine George Cross	3–0	Mildura City	Chaplin Reserve
13:00 AEST

11 July	Cobram Victory	3–1	Moreland Zebras	John McEwen Reserve
8:00
