= 2026 South Island United FC season =

South Island United FC
2026 season
- Owner: Christchurch United
- Chairman: Viatcheslav Meyn
- Head Coach: Rob Sherman
- Stadium: United Sports Centre
- OFC Professional League: 4th (Circuit Series); 3rd (Leaders Group)
- OFC Professional League Finals: Semi-final
- Top goalscorer: Ryan Feutz (9 goals)
- Biggest win: 4–1 vs PNG Hekari, 14 March 2026, OFC Pro League
- Biggest defeat: 3-0 vs Auckland FC, 17 January 2026, OFC Pro League; 4-1 vs South Melbourne, 27 February 2026, OFC Pro League; 5-2 vs Auckland FC, 12 May 2026, OFC Pro League
Home colours	Away colours	Third colours
- All statistics correct as of 19 May 2026.

The 2026 South Island United Football Club season was the club's first season in existence and their inaugural season in the OFC Professional League.

== Management team ==
=== Technical officials ===
Position	Name	Ref.
Head coach	(Wales) Rob Sherman	
Assistant coach	(Spain) Adrià Casals	
Goalkeeping coach	(New Zealand) Callum Kennett	
Team manager	(Netherlands) Coen Lanmers	
Physiotherapist	(New Zealand) Michael Peterson	

=== Management ===
Position	Name	Ref.
General manager	(New Zealand) Ryan Edwards	

== Squad information ==
Players and squad numbers last updated on 20 May 2026. Appearances include all competitions.

Note: Flags indicate national team as has been defined under FIFA eligibility rules. Players may hold more than one non-FIFA nationality.

=== First team ===
No.	Player	Nat.	Positions	Date of birth (age)	Place of birth	Signed in	Signed from	Apps.	Goals
Goalkeepers
1	Steven van Dijk (V)	(Netherlands)	GK	1 September 1997 (aged 28)	(Netherlands) Apeldoorn	2025	(New Zealand) Christchurch United	17	0
21	Callum Kennett	(New Zealand)	GK	26 March 2004 (aged 21)	(New Zealand) Wellington	2025	(New Zealand) Upper Hutt City	1	0
23	Shea Stapleton	(New Zealand)	GK	23 June 1999 (aged 26)	(New Zealand) Wellington	2025	(New Zealand) Petone	0	0
Defenders
2	Lewis Partridge	(New Zealand)	DF	7 January 2005 (aged 20)	(New Zealand) Lincoln	2025	(New Zealand) Wellington Phoenix Reserves	16	0
3	Ollie van Rijssel (vice-captain)	(New Zealand) (Germany)	DF	4 September 2000 (aged 25)	(New Zealand) Wellington	2025	(New Zealand) Christchurch United	11	0
4	Christian Gray (captain)	(New Zealand)	DF	29 November 1996 (aged 29)	(New Zealand) Gisborne	2026	(New Zealand) Auckland City	16	1
5	Josh Rogerson	(New Zealand)	DF	4 January 2000 (aged 25)	(New Zealand) Wellington	2025	(New Zealand) Christchurch United	12	0
6	Jaylen Rodwell	(New Zealand) (Niue)	DF	31 May 2002 (aged 23)	(New Zealand) Auckland	2025	(New Zealand) Auckland United	17	1
12	Riley Grover	(New Zealand)	DF	29 February 2004 (aged 21)	(New Zealand) Upper Moutere	2025	(New Zealand) Christchurch United	10	1
24	Jacob Krayem (V)	(Australia) (Lebanon)	DF	19 June 2002 (aged 23)	(Australia)	2025	(Australia) Wynnum Wolves	12	1
Midfielders
7	David Yoo	(New Zealand)	MF	7 December 1999 (aged 26)	(South Korea) Seoul	2025	(New Zealand) Auckland City	18	4
8	Jackson Manuel	(New Zealand)	MF	24 February 2003 (aged 22)	(New Zealand) Wellington	2025	(New Zealand) Auckland City	17	0
13	Oliver Young	(New Zealand)	MF	9 March 2008 (aged 17)	(New Zealand)	2026	(New Zealand) Christchurch United	0	0
14	Dauntae Mariner (OFC)	(Samoa) (Australia)	MF	25 January 2000 (aged 25)	(Australia) Campbelltown	2025	(New Zealand) Nelson Suburbs	15	0
18	Charlie Beale	(New Zealand)	MF	3 August 2003 (aged 22)	(New Zealand) Mount Maunganui	2025	(New Zealand) Christchurch United	9	0
22	Rovu Boyers	(Solomon Islands) (New Zealand)	MF	19 April 2003 (aged 22)	(Solomon Islands) Munda	2025	(Australia) West Adelaide	12	6
Forwards
9	Ryan Feutz	(New Zealand)	FW	18 May 2001 (aged 24)	(New Zealand) Ashburton	2025	(Australia) Sydney Olympic	17	9
10	Ry McLeod	(New Zealand)	FW	2 May 2004 (aged 21)	(New Zealand) Tauranga	2025	(New Zealand) Western Springs	18	1
11	Oskar van Hattum	(New Zealand) (Austria)	FW	14 April 2002 (aged 23)	(New Zealand) New Plymouth	2025	(Canada) Valour	12	0
17	Deen Hasanovic (V)	(Australia)	FW	17 June 2002 (aged 23)	(Australia)	2026	(United Arab Emirates) Al-Ittifaq	3	0
19	Haris Zeb	(Pakistan) (New Zealand)	FW	15 May 2001 (aged 24)	(New Zealand) Palmerston North	2025	(New Zealand) Auckland City	17	2
20	Oliver Fay	(New Zealand)	FW	16 July 2003 (aged 22)	(New Zealand) Auckland	2025	(New Zealand) Auckland United	6	1

Notes:

- Player (V) – Player who is considered as a Visa player from outside of the Oceania Football Confederation.
- Player (OFC) – Player who is considered as an Oceania Visa player.

== Transfers ==
Note: Transfers' in/out date may refer to the date of announcement and not the date of signing from the mentioned players.

=== Transfers in ===
No.	Position	Name	From	Type/fee	Date	Ref.
7	FW	(New Zealand) David Yoo	(New Zealand) Auckland City	Free transfer	17 November 2025	
2	DF	(New Zealand) Lewis Partridge	(New Zealand) Wellington Phoenix Reserves	Free transfer	21 November 2025	
5	DF	(New Zealand) Josh Rogerson	(New Zealand) Christchurch United	Free transfer	27 November 2025	
3	MF	(New Zealand) Ollie van Rijssel	(New Zealand) Christchurch United	Free transfer	27 November 2025	
14	FW	(Samoa) Dauntae Mariner	(New Zealand) Nelson Suburbs	Free transfer	29 November 2025	
12	DF	(New Zealand) Riley Grover	(New Zealand) Christchurch United	Free transfer	1 December 2025	
20	FW	(New Zealand) Oliver Fay	(New Zealand) Auckland United	Free transfer	5 December 2025	
6	DF	(New Zealand) Jaylen Rodwell	(New Zealand) Auckland United	Free transfer	6 December 2025	
8	MF	(New Zealand) Jackson Manuel	(New Zealand) Auckland City	Free transfer	8 December 2025	
11	FW	(New Zealand) Oskar van Hattum	(Canada) Valour FC	Free transfer	9 December 2025	
1	GK	(Netherlands) Steven van Dijk	(New Zealand) Christchurch United	Free transfer	10 December 2025	
18	MF	(New Zealand) Charlie Beale	(New Zealand) Christchurch United	Free transfer	11 December 2025	
10	DF	(New Zealand) Ry McLeod	(New Zealand) Western Springs	Free transfer	11 December 2025	
9	FW	(New Zealand) Ryan Feutz	(Australia) Sydney Olympic	Free transfer	12 December 2025	
23	GK	(New Zealand) Shea Stapleton	(New Zealand) Petone	Free transfer	13 December 2025	
21	GK	(New Zealand) Callum Kennett	(New Zealand) Upper Hutt City	Free transfer	13 December 2025	
19	FW	(Pakistan) Haris Zeb	(New Zealand) Auckland City	Free transfer	18 December 2025	
24	DF	(Australia) Jacob Krayem	(Australia) Wynnum Wolves	Free transfer	22 December 2025	
22	MF	(Solomon Islands) Rovu Boyers	(Australia) West Adelaide	Free transfer	31 December 2025	
17	MF	(Australia) Deen Hasanovic	(United Arab Emirates) Al-Ittifaq	Free transfer	2 January 2026	
4	DF	(New Zealand) Christian Gray	(New Zealand) Auckland City	Free transfer	7 January 2026	
13	MF	(New Zealand) Oliver Young	(New Zealand) Christchurch United	Academy Promotion	6 May 2026	

== Competitions ==
=== Overall record ===
Competition	First match	Last match	Record							
Competition	First match	Last match	Pld	W	D	L	GF	GA	GD	Win %
OFC Pro League	17 January 2026	20 May 2026	18	6	5	7	29	36	−7	33.33
Total			18	6	5	7	29	36	−7	33.33

Last updated: 20 May 2026
Source: Competitions

=== OFC Professional League ===
==== Circuit Series ====
===== Circuit Series table =====
Pos	Team	Pld	W	D	L	GF	GA	GD	Pts	Qualification
2	(Australia) South Melbourne	14	7	4	3	40	18	+22	25	Qualification for Leaders play-off group
3	(Fiji) Bula FC	14	6	3	5	14	15	−1	21	Qualification for Leaders play-off group
4	(New Zealand) South Island United	14	5	5	4	24	26	−2	20	Qualification for Leaders play-off group
5	(Solomon Islands) Solomon Kings	14	5	3	6	14	21	−7	18	Qualification for Challengers play-off group
6	(French Polynesia) Tahiti United	14	4	5	5	20	28	−8	17	Qualification for Challengers play-off group

Source: OFC Pro League
Rules for classification: 1) Points; 2) Goal difference; 3) Goals scored; 4) Head to head; 5) Head to head goal difference; 6) Head to head goals scored; 7) Disciplinary record; 8) Coin toss

===== Results by round =====
Round	1	3	4	5	6	7	9	2^{1}	10	11	12	13	14	8^{2}
Ground	A	N	N	N	A	N	A	N	N	N	N	N	N	N
Result	L	W	D	D	W	D	L	D	W	L	W	D	W	L
Position	8	4	5	5	4	4	5	4	4	6	4	5	4	4
Points	0	3	4	5	8	9	9	10	13	13	16	17	20	20

Source: OFC Pro League
A = Away; H = Home; N = Neutral; B = Bye; W = Win; D = Draw; L = Loss; X = Bye
Notes:
- ^{1} Matchday 2 (vs Bula FC) was postponed due to adverse weather conditions.
- ^{2} Matchday 8 (vs Auckland FC) was postponed due to adverse weather conditions.

===== Matches =====
The fixtures were announced on 24 November 2025.

Win Draw Loss Fixtures

Circuit 1

17 January 2026 1	Auckland FC	3–0	South Island United	Auckland, New Zealand
19:00 (NZDT)	Faulds 31'; Ferguson 83'; Gillion 88' (pen.)	(Report) (OFC)		Stadium: Eden Park; Attendance: 5,910; Referee: Ben Aukwai (Solomon Islands)

23 January 2026 3	South Island United	2–1	Vanuatu United	Albany, New Zealand
15:00 (NZDT)	Feutz 4'; Zeb 9'	(Report) (OFC)	Saniel 67'	Stadium: North Harbour Stadium; Attendance: 427; Referee: David Yareboinen (Papua New Guinea)

Circuit 2

1 February 2026 4	South Island United	3–3	South Melbourne	Port Moresby, Papua New Guinea
11:30 (PGT)	Zeb 9'; Yoo 51'; Rodwell 55'	(Report) (OFC)	Uchida 18'; Mikkola 45' (pen.); Swibel 69'	Stadium: PNG Football Stadium; Attendance: 155; Referee: Ben Aukwai (Solomon Islands)

4 February 2026 5	Solomon Kings	0–0	South Island United	Port Moresby, Papua New Guinea
11:30 (PGT)		(Report) (OFC)		Stadium: PNG Football Stadium; Attendance: 156; Referee: Jose Cabero (Chile)

7 February 2026 6	PNG Hekari	1–2	South Island United	Port Moresby, Papua New Guinea
15:30 (PGT)	Orobulu 47'	(Report) (OFC)	Feutz 36' (pen.); Boyers 90+7'	Stadium: PNG Football Stadium; Attendance: 1,400; Referee: Veer Singh (Fiji)

Circuit 3

21 February 2026 7	Tahiti United	2–2	South Island United	Melbourne, Australia
13:00 (AEDT)	Haewegene 18'; Tehau 65'	(Report) (OFC)	Feutz 48', 86'	Stadium: Olympic Village; Attendance: 75; Referee: Veer Singh (Fiji)

27 February 2026 9	South Melbourne	4–1	South Island United	Melbourne, Australia
19:00 (AEDT)	Uchida 25'; Janković 33'; Lackay 73'; Swibel 87'	(Report) (OFC)	Giannakopoulos 21' (o.g.)	Stadium: Home of the Matildas; Attendance: 400; Referee: David Yareboinen (Papua New Guinea)

3 March 2026 2	Bula FC	0–0	South Island United	Melbourne, Australia
19:00 (AEDT)		(Report) (OFC)		Stadium: Home of the Matildas; Attendance: ??? Referee: David Yareboinen (Papua New Guinea)
Note: Originally scheduled to be played in Auckland at North Harbour Stadium on 20 January 2026 during Circuit 1, but was postponed due to adverse weather in Auckland.

Circuit 4

14 March 2026 10	South Island United	4–1	PNG Hekari	Honiara, Solomon Islands
15:00 (SBT)	Boyers 16', 65', 80'; Gonerau 26' (o.g.)	(Report) (OFC)	Naime 4'	Stadium: National Stadium; Attendance: 4,500; Referee: Cory Mills (New Zealand)

19 March 2026 11	South Island United	2–3	Bula FC	Honiara, Solomon Islands
15:00 (SBT)	Yoo 16'; Boyers 26'	(Report) (OFC)	Dunn 56'; Krishna 90+1' (pen.); Wara 90+11'	Stadium: National Stadium; Attendance: 3,012; Referee: Cory Mills (New Zealand)

Circuit 5

11 April 2026 12	Vanuatu United	1–2	South Island United	Suva, Fiji
15:00 (FJT)	Soromon 50'	(Report) (OFC)	Feutz 90+4'; McLeod 90+8'	Stadium: HFC Bank Stadium; Attendance: 585; Referee: Kavitesh Behari (Fiji)

14 April 2026 13	South Island United	3–3	Tahiti United	Suva, Fiji
15:00 (FJT)	Yoo 43'; Feutz 57', 67' (pen.)	(Report) (OFC)	Tehau 53', 90+1'; Papaura 90+6'	Stadium: HFC Bank Stadium; Attendance: 188; Referee: Kavitesh Behari (Fiji)

17 April 2026 14	South Island United	2–1	Solomon Kings	Suva, Fiji
15:00 (FJT)	Gray 69'; Boyers 81'	(Report) (OFC)	Lofthouse 23'	Stadium: HFC Bank Stadium; Attendance: 643; Referee: Veer Singh (Fiji)

21 April 2026 8	South Island United	1–3	Auckland FC	Ba, Fiji
15:00 (FJT)	Yoo 76'	(Report) (OFC)	Faulds 28'; van Dijk 59' (o.g.); Prins 81'	Stadium: Govind Park; Attendance: 117; Referee: Anna-Marie Keighley (New Zealand)
Note: Originally scheduled to be played in Melbourne at Home of the Matildas on 24 February 2026 during Circuit 3, but was postponed due to adverse weather in Melbourne.

==== Leaders play-off group ====
===== Leaders play-off group table =====
Pos	Team	Pld	W	D	L	GF	GA	GD	Pts	Qualification
1	(Australia) South Melbourne	3	3	0	0	10	5	+5	9	Qualification for semi-finals
2	(New Zealand) Auckland FC	3	2	0	1	8	4	+4	6	Qualification for semi-finals
3	(New Zealand) South Island United	3	1	0	2	5	9	−4	3	Qualification for semi-finals
4	(Fiji) Bula FC	3	0	0	3	2	7	−5	0	Qualification for qualification play-off

Source: OFC Pro League
Rules for classification: 1) Points; 2) Goal difference; 3) Goals scored; 4) Head to head; 5) Head to head goal difference; 6) Head to head goals scored; 7) Disciplinary record; 8) Coin toss

===== Results by round =====
Round	1	2	3
Ground	N	N	A
Result	W	L	L
Position	2	3	3
Points	3	3	3

Source: OFC Pro League
A = Away; H = Home; N = Neutral; B = Bye; W = Win; D = Draw; L = Loss; X = Bye

===== Matches =====
The fixtures were announced on 22 April 2026 .

Win Draw Loss Fixtures

6 May 2026 1	Bula FC	0–1	South Island United	Auckland, New Zealand
15:00 (NZDT)			Feutz 90+3'	Stadium: Mount Smart Stadium

9 May 2026 2	South Melbourne	4–2	South Island United	Auckland, New Zealand
18:30 (NZDT)	Cocks 22'; Mikkola 26'; Rogerson 34' (o.g.); Swibel 45+2'		Feutz 17'; Fay 80'	Stadium: Eden Park

12 May 2026 3	Auckland FC	5–2	South Island United	Auckland, New Zealand
19:00 (NZDT)	Tade 37', 61'; Burns 58', 67'; Prins 86'		Yoo 50'; Grover 56'	Stadium: Eden Park

==== Knockout Stage ====
20 May 2026 SF	Auckland FC	1–0	South Island United	Auckland, New Zealand
18:30 (NZST)	Prins 71'	(Report)		Stadium: Mount Smart Stadium; Referee: Calvin Berg (New Zealand)

== Statistics ==
=== Appearances and goals ===
Includes all competitions.

As of 20 May 2026

No.	Pos	Nat	Player	Total		OFC Pro League	
No.	Pos	Nat	Player	Apps	Goals	Apps	Goals
Goalkeepers
1	GK	(Netherlands) NED	Steven van Dijk	17	0	17	0
21	GK	(New Zealand) NZL	Callum Kennett	1	0	1	0
23	GK	(New Zealand) NZL	Shea Stapleton	0	0	0	0
Defenders
2	DF	(New Zealand) NZL	Lewis Partridge	16	0	12+4	0
3	DF	(New Zealand) NZL	Ollie van Rijssel	11	0	11	0
4	DF	(New Zealand) NZL	Christian Gray	16	1	15+1	1
5	DF	(New Zealand) NZL	Josh Rogerson	12	0	11+1	0
6	MF	(New Zealand) NZL	Jaylen Rodwell	17	1	15+2	1
12	DF	(New Zealand) NZL	Riley Grover	10	1	5+5	1
24	DF	(Australia) AUS	Jacob Krayem	12	1	10+2	1
Midfielders
7	MF	(New Zealand) NZL	David Yoo	18	4	17+1	4
8	MF	(New Zealand) NZL	Jackson Manuel	17	0	13+4	0
13	MF	(New Zealand) NZL	Oliver Young	0	0	0	0
14	MF	(Samoa) SAM	Dauntae Mariner	15	0	12+3	0
18	MF	(New Zealand) NZL	Charlie Beale	9	0	1+8	0
22	MF	(Solomon Islands) SOL	Rovu Boyers	12	6	7+5	6
Forwards
9	FW	(New Zealand) NZL	Ryan Feutz	17	9	15+2	9
10	FW	(New Zealand) NZL	Ry McLeod	18	1	12+6	1
11	FW	(New Zealand) NZL	Oskar van Hattum	12	0	8+4	0
17	FW	(Australia) AUS	Deen Hasanovic	3	0	1+2	0
19	FW	(Pakistan) PAK	Haris Zeb	17	2	15+2	2
20	FW	(New Zealand) NZL	Oliver Fay	6	1	2+4	1
