= 2026 South Melbourne FC season =

67th season of the South Melbourne Football Club

South Melbourne FC
2026–27 season
- Chairman: Bill Papastergiadis
- Head Coach: Siniša Cohadzić (until 30 May 2026); Zaim Zeneli (caretaker) (30 May – 1 June 2026); Siniša Cohadzić (2 June – 12 October 2026); Sam Poutakidis (caretaker) (12–21 October 2026); Jamie Reed (from 21 October 2026)
- Stadium: Lakeside Stadium
- NPL Victoria: 4th
- NPL Victoria Finals: Preliminary-finals
- Australian Championship: Group stage
- Australia Cup: Winners
- Dockerty Cup: Round 5
- FV Community Shield: Runners-Up
- OFC Professional League: League: 1st Final: Runners-Up
- Top goalscorer: League: Nahuel Bonada; Jordan Swibel (5 goals each); All: Jordan Swibel (16 goals)
- Highest home attendance: 5,268 vs Lions FC (15 September 2026); Australia Cup
- Lowest home attendance: 2,035 vs Fremantle City (9 August 2026); Australia Cup
- Biggest win: 8–1 vs Tahiti United (H), 21 April 2026, OFC Pro League
- Biggest defeat: 0–4 vs Heidelberg United (A), 8 May 2026, NPL Victoria vs Caroline Springs George Cross (H), 18 May 2026, NPL Victoria vs Avondale (H), 25 May 2026, NPL Victoria
- All statistics correct as of 29 October 2026.

The 2026 season is the 67th in the history of South Melbourne Football Club. In addition to the regional league, the club participated in the Australian Championship for the second time, the Dockerty Cup for the 29th time, the Australia Cup for the 29th time and the OFC Professional League for the first time.

== Overview ==
=== NPL Victoria ===
On 8 December 2025, the fixtures for the 2026 NPL season were released by Football Victoria. South Melbourne were drawn away to Avondale on the opening weekend, and finish the regular season away to Caroline Springs George Cross.

=== Australia Cup ===
On 28 January 2026, Football Australia announced changes to the Australia Cup from the 2026 season. As winners of the 2025 Australian Championship, South Melbourne were awarded automatic entry into the Round of 32. South Melbourne were drawn to play A-League Men side Adelaide United at home. South Melbourne beat Adelaide United in what was considered a "cupset" 2–1. Bul Juach and Yuki Uchida grabbed the goals as they overturned a 1–0 deficit. In the Round of 16, South Melbourne were drawn at home to NPL Western Australia side Fremantle City.

=== Dockerty Cup ===
As an NPL Victoria side, South Melbourne enter in Round 4. The draw for this round took place on 3 March 2026, with the Hellas being drawn away to the winner of Berwick City and Hampton East Brighton. The Hellas beat Victorian State League 1 South/East side Hampton East Brighton 2–1 to progress to the next round. In Round 5, South Melbourne were drawn at home to Victoria Premier League 1 side FC Bulleen Lions. They lost 4–1, ending their cup run.

=== OFC Pro League ===
On 29 October 2025, South Melbourne were awarded a spot in the inaugural OFC Professional League. They kicked off their season with a 2–1 win over Tahiti United thanks to a goal eight minutes into stoppage time by substitute Andrew Mesourouni. Their second game, due to be held at North Harbour Stadium was postponed due to adverse weather in Auckland.

On 24 June 2026, South Melbourne signed David Yoo from South Island United, making this the first transfer between two OFC Professional League clubs.

== Squad information ==
=== First team ===
As of 18 January 2026

Note: Flags indicate national team as defined under FIFA eligibility rules; some limited exceptions apply. Players may hold more than one non-FIFA nationality.

| No. | Pos. | Nation | Player |
|---|---|---|---|
| 1 | GK | ESP | Javier López |
| 2 | DF | AUS | Lucas Inglese |
| 3 | DF | AUS | Jordon Lampard |
| 4 | DF | AUS | Marko Janković (captain) |
| 7 | FW | NZL | Ishveer Singh |
| 8 | DF | NZL | Luka Coveny |
| 9 | FW | AUS | Jordan Swibel |
| 11 | FW | JPN | Yuki Uchida |
| 13 | FW | AUS | James Lackay |
| 14 | MF | AUS | Alex Menelaou |
| 15 | DF | AUS | Che Gorr Burchmore |
| 16 | FW | AUS | Arran Cocks |

| No. | Pos. | Nation | Player |
|---|---|---|---|
| 17 | MF | AUS | Thomas Giannakopoulos |
| 19 | MF | AUS | Andrew Mesourouni |
| 20 | GK | AUS | Jake Charlston |
| 21 | MF | AUS | Sebastian Pasquali |
| 22 | MF | AUS | Max Mikkola |
| 23 | DF | AUS | Jacob Eliopoulos |
| 24 | FW | ARG | Nahuel Bonada |
| 27 | DF | AUS | Jack Painter-Andrews |
| 30 | GK | AUS | Iliya Shalamanov-Trenkov |
| 88 | MF | AUS | Charlie Leech |
| 99 | MF | AUS | Jack Pope |

== Transfers ==
Note: Transfers' in/out date may refer to the date of announcement and not the date of signing from the mentioned players.

=== Transfers in ===
| No. | Position | Player | Transferred from | Type/fee | Contract length | Date | Ref. |
|---|---|---|---|---|---|---|---|
| 16 | FW | (Australia) Arran Cocks | (Australia) Broadmeadow Magic | Free transfer | 1 year | 8 January 2026 | |
| 9 | FW | (Australia) Jordan Swibel | (Australia) Marconi Stallions | Free transfer | 1 year | 9 January 2026 | |
| 7 | FW | (New Zealand) Ishveer Singh | (New Zealand) Auckland United | Free transfer | 1 year | 11 January 2026 | |
| 13 | FW | (Australia) James Lackay | (Australia) Melbourne Victory Youth | Free transfer | 1 year | 12 January 2026 | |
| 8 | DF | (New Zealand) Luka Coveny | Free Agent | Free transfer | 1 year | 13 January 2026 | |
| 30 | GK | (Australia) Iliya Shalamanov-Trenkov | (Bulgaria) Spartak Varna | Free transfer | 1 year | 14 January 2026 | |
| 7 | FW | (New Zealand) David Yoo | (New Zealand) South Island United | Free transfer | 6 months | 24 June 2026 | |
| 10 | FW | (South Sudan) Bul Juach | (Canada) Pacific FC | Free transfer | 6 months | 1 July 2026 | |
| 8 | MF | (Australia) Paulo Retre | (New Zealand) Wellington Phoenix | Free transfer | 2 years | 2 July 2026 | |
| 5 | DF | (Australia) Hassan Ramazani | Vanuatu United | Loan | 6 months | 2 July 2026 | |
| 6 | | (Australia) Sam Fawcett | | Free transfer | 6 months | 2 July 2026 | |
| 12 | DF | (Australia) Richard Nkomo | (Australia) Newcastle Jets | Free transfer | 6 months | 3 July 2026 | |
| | MF | (Australia) Christian Polyzoudis | (Australia) Melbourne City | Free transfer | 3 months | 2 October 2026 | |
| | FW | (New Zealand) Kosta Barbarouses | (Australia) Western Sydney Wanderers | Free transfer | 1 year | 2 October 2026 | |

=== Transfers out ===
| No. | Position | Player | Transferred to | Type/fee | Date | Ref. |
|---|---|---|---|---|---|---|
| 24 | FW | (Argentina) Nahuel Bonada | (Australia) Preston Lions | Loan | 2 July 2025 | |
| 24 | FW | (Australia) Iliya Shalamanov-Trenkov | (Australia) Altona Magic | Loan | 2 July 2025 | |
| 31 | MF | (Australia) Ethan O’Sullivan | (Australia) Bayswater City | Free transfer | 2 July 2025 | |
| 28 | MF | (Australia) Thierry Papadimitriou | (Australia) Springvale White Eagles | Free transfer | 2 July 2025 | |
| 2 | DF | (Australia) Lucas Inglese | (Australia) Brunswick Juventus | Free transfer | 2 July 2025 | |
| 99 | MF | (Australia) Jack Pope | (Australia) Caroline Springs George Cross | Free transfer | 2 July 2025 | |
| 8 | DF | (New Zealand) Luka Coveny | (Australia) Western United U21 | Free transfer | 2 July 2025 | |
| 88 | MF | (Australia) Charlie Leech | (Australia) Manningham United Blues | Free transfer | 2 July 2025 | |
| 26 | FW | (Australia) Campbell Dovison | (Australia) Bentleigh Greens | Free transfer | 2 July 2025 | |
| 15 | DF | (Australia) Che Gorr-Burchmore | (Australia) Eastern Lions | Free transfer | 2 July 2025 | |
| — | MF | (Australia) Luca Durso | (Australia) Bayside Argonauts | Free transfer | 2 July 2025 | |
| 34 | FW | (Australia) Thomas Killick | (Australia) Springvale White Eagles | Free transfer | 2 July 2025 | |
| 39 | MF | (Australia) Gerry Angelatos | (Australia) Springvale White Eagles | Free transfer | 2 July 2025 | |
| 49 | MF | (Australia) Angus Angelatos | (Australia) Springvale White Eagles | Free transfer | 2 July 2025 | |

== Pre-season and friendlies ==
| 21 January 2026 | Preston Lions | v | South Melbourne | Reservoir |
| 20:00 | | Report | | Stadium: B.T. Connor Reserve; Referee: Lucas Mattia |

== Competitions ==
=== Overall record ===
| Competition | First match | Last match | Starting round | Final position | Record | | | | | | | |
| Competition | First match | Last match | Starting round | Final position | Pld | W | D | L | GF | GA | GD | Win % |
|---|---|---|---|---|---|---|---|---|---|---|---|---|
| NPL Victoria | 14 February 2026 | 29 August 2026 | Matchday 1 | 4th | 26 | 13 | 2 | 11 | 39 | 36 | +3 | 50.00 |
| NPL Victoria Finals | 6 September 2026 | 11 September 2026 | Elimination-final | Preliminary-final | 2 | 1 | 0 | 1 | 3 | 3 | +0 | 50.00 |
| Australian Championship | 17 October 2026 | | Matchday 1 | | 3 | 2 | 1 | 0 | 4 | 1 | +3 | 66.67 |
| Australia Cup | 30 July 2026 | 10 October 2026 | Round of 32 | Winners | 5 | 3 | 2 | 0 | 11 | 7 | +4 | 60.00 |
| Dockerty Cup | 4 April 2026 | 28 April 2026 | Round 4 | Round 5 | 2 | 1 | 0 | 1 | 3 | 5 | −2 | 50.00 |
| FV Community Shield (Note: This match doubled as an NPL Victoria match (so no information has been included as not to double up the match).) | 8 May 2026 | | Final | Runners-up | 0 | 0 | 0 | 0 | 0 | 0 | +0 | — |
| OFC Pro League | 18 January 2026 | 24 May 2026 | Matchday 1 | Runners-up | 19 | 11 | 4 | 4 | 55 | 25 | +30 | 57.89 |
| Total | | | | | 57 | 31 | 9 | 17 | 115 | 77 | +38 | 54.39 |

Last updated: 29 October 2026
Source: Competitions

=== National Premier Leagues Victoria ===
==== League table ====
| Pos | Team | Pld | W | D | L | GF | GA | GD | Pts | Promotion, qualification or relegation |
|---|---|---|---|---|---|---|---|---|---|---|
| 2 | Hume City | 26 | 15 | 4 | 7 | 51 | 36 | +15 | 49 | Qualification to Finals series |
| 3 | Avondale FC (Note: Team pre-qualified to the Australian Championship as a foundation club.) (C) | 26 | 15 | 2 | 9 | 65 | 34 | +31 | 47 | Qualification to Finals series |
| 4 | South Melbourne | 26 | 13 | 2 | 11 | 39 | 36 | +3 | 41 | Qualification to Finals series |
| 5 | Heidelberg United | 26 | 11 | 7 | 8 | 42 | 34 | +8 | 40 | Qualification to Finals series |
| 6 | Preston Lions | 26 | 15 | 6 | 5 | 41 | 19 | +22 | 39 (Note: Preston Lions were deducted six points, due to conduct in a previous fixture during the 2025 NPL Victoria preliminary final. Preston were also deducted another three points due to fan conduct occurring during a league fixture with South Melbourne on 18 July 2026. Further sanctions were announced on 19 August, with Preston receiving an additional three point deduction, which came into effect on 28 August.) | Qualification to Finals series |

Source: Dribl
Rules for classification: 1) points; 2) goal difference; 3) number of goals scored; 4) aggregate head-to-head results; 5) away goals; 6) alphabetical order/coin toss at the end of the season.
(C) Champions

==== Results summary ====
| Overall | | | | | | | | Home | | | | | | Away | | | | | |
| Pld | W | D | L | GF | GA | GD | Pts | W | D | L | GF | GA | GD | W | D | L | GF | GA | GD |
|---|---|---|---|---|---|---|---|---|---|---|---|---|---|---|---|---|---|---|---|
| 13 | 7 | 0 | 6 | 19 | 21 | −2 | 21 | 2 | 0 | 3 | 7 | 9 | −2 | 5 | 0 | 3 | 12 | 12 | 0 |

Last updated: 18 May 2026.
Source: NPL Victoria

==== Results by round ====
| Round | 1 | 2 | 3 | 4 | 5 | 6 | 7 | 8 | 9 | 10 | 11 | 12 | 13 | 14 | 15 | 16 | 17 | 18 | 19 | 20 | 21 | 22 | 23 | 24 | 25 | 26^{1} |
|---|---|---|---|---|---|---|---|---|---|---|---|---|---|---|---|---|---|---|---|---|---|---|---|---|---|---|
| Ground | A | H | A | H | A | A | H | A | H | A | H | A | H | H | A | H | A | H | H | A | H | A | H | A | H | A |
| Result | W | L | W | W | W | L | W | W | L | W | L | L | L | L | D | L | W | L | W | W | D | W | W | W | L | L |
| Position | 2 | 5 | 3 | 1 | 1 | 2 | 1 | 1 | 1 | 1 | 2 | 5 | 5 | 6 | 6 | 7 | 6 | 8 | 7 | 6 | 6 | 5 | 4 | 4 | 5 | 4 |
| Points | 3 | 3 | 6 | 9 | 12 | 12 | 15 | 18 | 18 | 21 | 21 | 21 | 21 | 21 | 22 | 22 | 25 | 25 | 28 | 31 | 32 | 35 | 38 | 41 | 41 | 41 |

Source: NPL Victoria
A = Away; H = Home; N = Neutral; B = Bye; W = Win; D = Draw; L = Loss
Notes:
- ^{1} Between matchweek 25 and 26, Preston Lions were deducted 6 points.

==== Matches ====
The fixtures were announced on 7 December 2025.

Win Draw Loss Fixtures

| 14 February 2026 1 | Avondale | 0–2 | South Melbourne | Parkville |
| 15:00 AEDT | | Report | Mikkola 32'; Giannakopoulos 76' | Stadium: Avenger Park; Referee: Pouya Ghadirian |

| 19 February 2026 2 | South Melbourne | 1–2 | Hume City | Albert Park |
| 19:30 AEDT | Singh 47' | Report | Whyte 27'; Bayew 44' | Stadium: Lakeside Stadium; Referee: Jack Morgan |

| 28 February 2026 3 | Altona Magic | 1–2 | South Melbourne | Altona North |
| 18:15 AEDT | Sordo 24' (pen.) | Report | Bonada 60', 62' | Stadium: Paisley Park Soccer Complex; Referee: Jack Morgan |

| 7 March 2026 4 | South Melbourne | 1–0 | Bentleigh Greens | Bundoora |
| 19:00 AEDT | Swibel 3' | Report | | Stadium: The Home of the Matildas; Referee: Yanni Mallidis |

| 13 March 2026 5 | Green Gully | 0–1 | South Melbourne | Keilor Downs |
| 19:30 AEDT | | Report | Saristavros 26' | Stadium: Green Gully Reserve; Referee: Ugur Arslan |

| 21 March 2026 6 | Dandenong Thunder | 3–0 | South Melbourne | Dandenong |
| 19:00 AEDT | Jalloh 58'; Courtney-Perkins 59'; Sulemani 89' | Report | | Stadium: George Andrews Reserve; Referee: Michael Ouliaris |

| 31 March 2026 7 | South Melbourne | 4–2 | Dandenong City | Albert Park |
| 19:30 AEDT | Bonada 56'; Swibel 77'; Eliopoulos 83'; Leech 85' | Report | Guy 72'; Bower 90+3' | Stadium: Lakeside Stadium; Referee: Lucas Mattia |

| 11 April 2026 8 | Preston Lions | 0–3 | South Melbourne | Reservoir |
| 15:00 AEST | | Report | Dovison 56'; Mikkola 73'; Ali 82' (o.g.) | Stadium: B.T. Connor Reserve; Referee: Jack Morgan |

| 19 April 2026 9 | South Melbourne | 0–3 | Oakleigh Cannons | Albert Park |
| 15:30 AEST | | Report | Hall 45+6'; Duratovic 73'; Guest 89' | Stadium: Lakeside Stadium; Referee: Ross Clark |

| 24 April 2026 10 | St Albans Saints Dinamo | 0–4 | South Melbourne | St Albans |
| 20:00 AEST | | Report | Swibel 22'; Bonada 48'; Eliopoulos 65'; Leech 86' | Stadium: Churchill Reserve; Referee: Jock Quartermain |

| 1 May 2026 11 | South Melbourne | 1–2 | Melbourne City Youth | Albert Park |
| 19:30 AEST | Mikkola 31' | Report | Ballah 10'; Wong 60' | Stadium: Lakeside Stadium; Referee: Ioannis Zisis |

| 8 May 2026 12 (FV Community Shield) | Heidelberg United | 4–0 | South Melbourne | Heidelberg West |
| 19:30 AEST | Trubiano 24' (o.g.); Yokokawa 30'; Collins 32'; Bramwell 51' | Report | | Stadium: Olympic Village; Referee: Jack Morgan |
Note: This match doubled as the FV Community Shield match for 2026.

| 18 May 2026 13 | South Melbourne | 0–4 | Caroline Springs George Cross | Albert Park |
| 19:30 AEST | | Report | Filer 2'; Mazis 14', 73'; Lofts 45+1' | Stadium: Lakeside Stadium; Referee: Jack Morgan |

| 25 May 2026 14 | South Melbourne | 0–4 | Avondale | Albert Park |
| 19:30 AEST | | Report | Flottmann 30'; Ott 36'; Gorr Burchmore 53' (o.g.); Murai 65' | Stadium: Lakeside Stadium; Referee: Ioannis Zisis |

| 30 May 2026 15 | Hume City | 1–1 | South Melbourne | Meadow Heights |
| 14:00 AEST | Spink 73' | Report | Cocks 66' | Stadium: Nasiol Stadium; Referee: Adam Bavcar |

| 7 June 2026 16 | South Melbourne | 2–3 | Altona Magic | Albert Park |
| 15:30 AEST | Painter-Andrews 10'; Swibel 22' | Report | López 38' (o.g.); McCloskey 66'; Mabok 68' | Stadium: Lakeside Stadium; Referee: Hayden Langholz |

| 19 June 2026 17 | Bentleigh Greens | 1–5 | South Melbourne | Cheltenham |
| 19:30 AEST | Petratos 36' | Report | Cocks 2'; Bonada 4'; Yuki Uchida 25'; Pope 72'; Mikkola 85' | Stadium: Kingston Heath Soccer Complex; Referee: Michael Ouliaris |

| 28 June 2026 18 | South Melbourne | 1–2 | Green Gully | Albert Park |
| 15:30 AEST | Swibel 79' | Report | Habib 14'; Kur 55' | Stadium: Lakeside Stadium; Referee: Caitlin Williams |

| 5 July 2026 19 | South Melbourne | 1–0 | Dandenong Thunder | Albert Park |
| 15:30 AEST | Cocks 49' | Report | | Stadium: Lakeside Stadium; Referee: Adam Bavcar |

| 10 July 2026 20 | Dandenong City | 0–2 | South Melbourne | Endeavour Hills |
| 19:45 AEST | | Report | Pasquali 2'; Uchida 47' | Stadium: Frank Holohan Soccer Complex; Referee: Michael Ouliaris |

| 18 July 2026 21 | South Melbourne | 0–0 | Preston Lions | Albert Park |
| 15:15 AEST | | Report | | Stadium: Lakeside Stadium; Referee: Adam Bavca |

| 24 July 2026 22 | Oakleigh Cannons | 1–2 | South Melbourne | Oakleigh |
| 20:15 AEST | Tratt 90+4' | Report | Yoo 61'; Jankovic 72' | Stadium: Jack Edwards Reserve; Referee: Ioannis Zisis |

| 2 August 2026 23 | South Melbourne | 2–0 | St Albans Saints Dinamo | Albert Park |
| 15:30 AEST | Mesourouni 31', 40' | Report | | Stadium: Lakeside Stadium; Referee: Tom Fell |

| 15 August 2026 24 | Melbourne City Youth | 0–3 | South Melbourne | Cranbourne East |
| 15:00 AEST | | Report | Juach 30', 34'; Skapoulas 89' | Stadium: Casey Fields; Referee: Bayley Pennuto |

| 23 August 2026 25 | South Melbourne | 1–2 | Heidelberg United | Albert Park |
| 15:30 AEST | Mesourouni 54' | Report | Razmovski 66'; Theoharous 90+1' | Stadium: Lakeside Stadium |

| 29 August 2026 26 | Caroline Springs George Cross | 1–0 | South Melbourne | Fraser Rise |
| 15:00 AEST | Saniel 8' | Report | | Stadium: City Vista Recreation Reserve; Referee: Lucas Mattia |

==== Finals series ====
| 6 September 2026 Elimination-final | South Melbourne | 2–1 | Heidelberg United | Albert Park |
| 17:00 AEST | Juach 3' (pen.), 20' | Report | Bramwell 14' | Stadium: Lakeside Stadium; Referee: Adam Bavcar |

| 11 September 2026 Preliminary-final | Oakleigh Cannons | 2–1 | South Melbourne | Oakleigh |
| 19:30 AEST | Strong 11'; Guest 63' | Report | Yoo 29' | Stadium: Jack Edwards Reserve; Referee: Michael Ouliaris |

=== Australian Championship ===
==== League table ====
| Pos | Team | Pld | W | PKW | PKL | L | GF | GA | GD | Pts | |
|---|---|---|---|---|---|---|---|---|---|---|---|
| 1 | South Melbourne (Q) | 5 | 2 | 2 | 0 | 1 | 4 | 2 | +2 | 10 | Finals series |
| 2 | Sydney United 58 | 5 | 2 | 1 | 1 | 1 | 6 | 5 | +1 | 9 | Finals series |
| 3 | Sutherland Sharks | 5 | 2 | 0 | 1 | 2 | 6 | 3 | +3 | 7 | |
| 4 | Canberra Croatia (E) | 5 | 1 | 0 | 1 | 3 | 3 | 9 | −6 | 4 | |

Updated to match(es) played on 15 November 2026. Source: Football Australia
(E) Eliminated; (Q) Qualified to the phase indicated

==== Matches ====
The fixtures were announced on 16 September 2026.

Win Draw Loss Fixtures

| 17 October 2026 1 | Sutherland Sharks | 0–1 | South Melbourne | Miranda, Sydney |
| 15:00 AEDT | | Report | Uchida 46' | Stadium: Seymour Shaw Stadium; Attendance: 3,167; Referee: Nathan Shakespear |

| 23 October 2026 2 | South Melbourne | 1–1 (5–4 p) | Sydney United 58 | Albert Park, Melbourne |
| 19:30 AEDT | Swibel 48' (pen.) | Report | Wells 39' (pen.) | Stadium: Lakeside Stadium; Attendance: 4,163; Referee: Nathan Shakespear |
| | Penalties |
| | Janković (penalty scored); Pasquali (penalty scored); Juach (penalty scored); Eliopoulos (penalty missed); Mikkola (penalty scored); Giannakopoulos (penalty scored) | | (penalty missed) De Oliveira; (penalty scored) Krslovic; (penalty scored) Rule; (penalty scored) El-Sabeh; (penalty scored) Wells; (penalty missed) Cop |

| 29 October 2026 3 | Canberra Croatia | 0–2 | South Melbourne | Deakin, Canberra |
| 19:30 AEDT | | Report | Swibel 28'; Giannakopoulos 76' | Stadium: Deakin Stadium; Attendance: 1,053; Referee: Rowan Fisher |

| 7 November 2026 4 | South Melbourne | 0–0 (6–5 p) | Sutherland Sharks | Albert Park, Melbourne |
| 19:30 AEDT | | Report | | Stadium: Lakeside Stadium; Attendance: 3,256; Referee: Noah Moss |
| | Penalties |
| | Janković (penalty scored); Swibel (penalty scored); Pasquali (penalty missed); Mesourouni (penalty scored); Retre (penalty scored); Uchida (penalty scored); Painter-Andrews (penalty scored) | | (penalty scored) Harb; (penalty missed) Yokokawa; (penalty scored) Matthews; (penalty scored) Sattout; (penalty scored) Bonilla; (penalty scored) Perez; (penalty missed) Casella |

| 14 November 2026 5 | Sydney United 58 | 1–0 | South Melbourne | Edensor Park, Sydney |
| 15:00 AEDT | Jennings 63' | Report | | Stadium: Sydney United Sports Centre; Attendance: 1,600; Referee: Eric Saba |

| 20 November 2026 6 | South Melbourne | v | Canberra Croatia | Albert Park, Melbourne |
| 19:30 AEDT | | Report | | Stadium: Lakeside Stadium |

=== Australia Cup ===
| 30 July 2026 Round of 32 | South Melbourne | 2–1 | Adelaide United | Albert Park, Melbourne |
| 19:30 AEST | Juach 33'; Uchida 68' | Report | Goodwin 3' | Stadium: Lakeside Stadium; Attendance: 3,080; Referee: Declan Woods |

| 9 August 2026 Round of 16 | South Melbourne | 3–3 (a.e.t.) (3–1 p) | Fremantle City | Albert Park, Melbourne |
| 19:40 AEST | Cocks 12'; Yoo 20'; Juach 70' (pen.) | Report | Chechlacz 32' (pen.); Edwards 36'; Mokala 51' | Stadium: Lakeside Stadium; Attendance: 2,035; Referee: Jock Quartermain |
| | Penalties |
| | Jankovic (penalty scored); Swibel (penalty scored); Cocks (penalty scored) | | (penalty scored) Ambrogio; (penalty missed) Chechlacz; (penalty missed) Ahmedov; (penalty missed) Woodcock |

| 26 August 2026 Quarter-finals | Preston Lions | 1–2 | South Melbourne | Reservoir, Melbourne |
| 19:30 AEST | Cuba 49' | Report | Painter-Andrews 61'; Cocks 86' | Stadium: Genis Steel Stadium; Attendance: 6,673; Referee: Tom Fell |

| 15 September 2026 Semi-finals | South Melbourne | 3–1 | Lions FC | Albert Park, Melbourne |
| 19:30 AEST | Juach 53', 60', 83' | Report | Hart-Phillips 23' | Stadium: Lakeside Stadium; Attendance: 5,268; Referee: Rowan Fisher |

| 10 October 2026 Final | South Melbourne | 1–1 (a.e.t.) (4–3 p) | Melbourne Victory | Melbourne |
| AEST | Mikkola 117' | Report | Genreau 95' | Stadium: AAMI Park; Attendance: 29,911; Referee: Alireza Faghani |
| | Penalties |
| | Jankovic (penalty scored); Swibel (penalty scored); Lackay (penalty scored); Mesourouni (penalty scored) | | (penalty scored) May; (penalty missed) Sawyer; (penalty scored) Ghossaini; (penalty scored) Genreau; (penalty missed) Davidson |

=== Dockerty Cup ===
Win Draw Loss Fixtures

| 4 April 2026 Round 4 | Hampton East Brighton | 1–2 | South Melbourne | Brighton East |
| 15:00 AEDT | Simmons 68' | Report | Mesourouni 35', 48' | Stadium: Dendy Park; Referee: Dimitri Gounaris |

| 28 April 2026 Round 5 | South Melbourne | 1–4 | FC Bulleen Lions | Port Melbourne |
| 19:30 AEDT | Cardillo 52' (o.g.) | Report | Mantelos 16'; Harbinson 45'; Assumpcao 74'; Bell 80' | Stadium: Struc Steel Stadium; Referee: Momcilo Veselinov |

=== OFC Professional League ===
==== Circuit Series ====
===== Circuit Series table =====
| Pos | Team | Pld | W | D | L | GF | GA | GD | Pts | Qualification |
|---|---|---|---|---|---|---|---|---|---|---|
| 1 | (New Zealand) Auckland FC | 14 | 10 | 2 | 2 | 26 | 10 | +16 | 32 | Qualification for Leaders play-off group |
| 2 | (Australia) South Melbourne | 14 | 7 | 4 | 3 | 40 | 18 | +22 | 25 | Qualification for Leaders play-off group |
| 3 | (Fiji) Bula FC | 14 | 6 | 3 | 5 | 14 | 15 | −1 | 21 | Qualification for Leaders play-off group |
| 4 | (New Zealand) South Island United | 14 | 5 | 5 | 4 | 24 | 26 | −2 | 20 | Qualification for Leaders play-off group |
| 5 | (Solomon Islands) Solomon Kings | 14 | 5 | 3 | 6 | 14 | 21 | −7 | 18 | Qualification for Challengers play-off group |

Source: OFC Pro League
Rules for classification: 1) Points; 2) Goal difference; 3) Goals scored; 4) Head to head; 5) Head to head goal difference; 6) Head to head goals scored; 7) Disciplinary record; 8) Coin toss

===== Results summary =====
| Overall | | | | | | | | Home | | | | | | Away | | | | | |
| Pld | W | D | L | GF | GA | GD | Pts | W | D | L | GF | GA | GD | W | D | L | GF | GA | GD |
|---|---|---|---|---|---|---|---|---|---|---|---|---|---|---|---|---|---|---|---|
| 10 | 5 | 4 | 1 | 27 | 12 | +15 | 19 | 3 | 1 | 0 | 15 | 4 | +11 | 2 | 3 | 1 | 12 | 8 | +4 |

Last updated: 19 March 2026.
Source: OFC Pro League

===== Results by round =====
| Round | 1 | 3 | 4 | 5 | 6 | 7 | 9 | 2^{1} | 10 | 11 | 12 | 13 | 14 | 8^{2} |
|---|---|---|---|---|---|---|---|---|---|---|---|---|---|---|
| Ground | A | A | A | A | H | H | H | H | A | A | A | H | H | H |
| Result | W | W | D | D | W | D | W | W | L | D | L | W | L | W |
| Position | 2 | 2 | 2 | 2 | 2 | 2 | 2 | 2 | 2 | 2 | 2 | 2 | 2 | 2 |
| Points | 3 | 6 | 7 | 8 | 11 | 12 | 15 | 18 | 18 | 19 | 19 | 22 | 22 | 25 |

Source: OFC Pro League
A = Away; H = Home; N = Neutral; B = Bye; W = Win; D = Draw; L = Loss; X = Bye
Notes:
- ^{1} Matchday 2 (vs Solomon Kings) was postponed due to adverse weather conditions.
- ^{2} Matchday 8 (vs Tahiti United) was postponed due to adverse weather conditions.

===== Matches =====
The fixtures were announced on 24 November 2025.

Win Draw Loss Fixtures

Circuit 1

| 18 January 2026 1 | Tahiti United (French Polynesia) | 1–2 | (Australia) South Melbourne | Auckland, New Zealand |
| 13:00 (NZDT) | Shan 35' | (Report) (OFC) | Uchida 47'; Mesourouni 90+8' | Stadium: Eden Park; Attendance: 565; Referee: Calvin Berg (New Zealand) |

| 24 January 2026 3 | PNG Hekari (Papua New Guinea) | 0–5 | (Australia) South Melbourne | Albany, New Zealand |
| 18:30 (NZDT) | | (Report) (OFC) | Giannakopoulos 3'; Swibel 7', 57'; Mikkola 45'; Bonada 87' | Stadium: North Harbour Stadium; Attendance: 355; Referee: Anna-Marie Keighley (New Zealand) |

Circuit 2

| 1 February 2026 4 | South Island United (New Zealand) | 3–3 | (Australia) South Melbourne | Port Moresby, Papua New Guinea |
| 11:30 (PGT) | Zeb 9'; Yoo 51'; Rodwell 55' | (Report) (OFC) | Uchida 18'; Mikkola 45' (pen.); Swibel 69' | Stadium: PNG Football Stadium; Attendance: 155; Referee: Ben Aukwai (Solomon Islands) |

| 4 February 2026 5 | Bula FC (Fiji) | 1–1 | (Australia) South Melbourne | Port Moresby, Papua New Guinea |
| 15:30 (PGT) | Wasasala 42' | (Report) (OFC) | Mesourouni 13' | Stadium: PNG Football Stadium; Attendance: 200; Referee: Calvin Berg (New Zealand) |

| 8 February 2026 6 | South Melbourne (Australia) | 5–2 | Vanuatu United | Port Moresby, Papua New Guinea |
| 11:30 (PGT) | Inglese 23'; Uchida 45+6'; Swibel 64' (pen.), 83'; Mesourouni 90+8' | (Report) (OFC) | Saniel 1', 71' | Stadium: PNG Football Stadium; Attendance: 448; Referee: Cory Mills (New Zealand) |

Circuit 3

| 21 February 2026 7 | South Melbourne (Australia) | 1–1 | (New Zealand) Auckland FC | Melbourne, Australia |
| 19:00 (AEDT) | Eliopoulos 90+6' | (Report) (OFC) | Gillion 89' | Stadium: Olympic Village; Attendance: 400; Referee: Calvin Berg (New Zealand) |

| 27 February 2026 9 | South Melbourne (Australia) | 4–1 | (New Zealand) South Island United | Melbourne, Australia |
| 19:00 (AEDT) | Uchida 25'; Janković 33'; Lackay 73'; Swibel 87' | (Report) (OFC) | Giannakopoulos 21' (o.g.) | Stadium: Home of the Matildas; Attendance: 400; Referee: David Yareboinen (Papua New Guinea) |

| 4 March 2026 2 | South Melbourne (Australia) | 5–0 | (Solomon Islands) Solomon Kings | Melbourne, Australia |
| 19:00 (AEDT) | Uchida 34'; Mikkola 52'; Lampard 63'; Bonada 79'; Cocks 90+3' | (Report) (OFC) | | Stadium: Home of the Matildas; Attendance: 350; Referee: Anna-Marie Keighley (New Zealand) |
Note: Originally scheduled to be played in Auckland at North Harbour Stadium on 21 January 2026 during Circuit 1, but was postponed due to adverse weather in Auckland.

Circuit 4

| 15 March 2026 10 | Vanuatu United | 2–0 | (Australia) South Melbourne | Honiara, Solomon Islands |
| 15:00 (SBT) | Saniel 32'; Ingham 79' | (Report) (OFC) | | Stadium: National Stadium; Attendance: 1,850; Referee: Ben Aukwai (Solomon Islands) |

| 19 March 2026 11 | Solomon Kings (Solomon Islands) | 1–1 | (Australia) South Melbourne | Honiara, Solomon Islands |
| 19:00 (SBT) | Wae 45+3' | (Report) (OFC) | Leech 90+6' | Stadium: National Stadium; Attendance: 9,005; Referee: David Yareboinen (Papua New Guinea) |

Circuit 5

| 12 April 2026 12 | Auckland FC (New Zealand) | 3–2 | (Australia) South Melbourne | Ba, Fiji |
| 15:00 (FJT) | Robinson 1'; Normann 59'; Wynne 84' | (Report) (OFC) | Mesourouni 10'; Leech 23' | Stadium: Govind Park; Attendance: 650; Referee: Calvin Berg (New Zealand) |

| 15 April 2026 13 | South Melbourne (Australia) | 2–0 | (Fiji) Bula FC | Ba, Fiji |
| 19:00 (FJT) | Uchida 21'; Mikkola 30' | (Report) (OFC) | | Stadium: Govind Park; Attendance: 1,173; Referee: Campbell-Kirk Kawana-Waugh (New Zealand) |

| 18 April 2026 14 | South Melbourne (Australia) | 1–2 | (Papua New Guinea) PNG Hekari | Ba, Fiji |
| 15:00 (FJT) | Janković 58' | (Report) (OFC) | Gonerau 7'; Kepo 90+1' | Stadium: Govind Park; Attendance: 325; Referee: Mederic Lacour (New Caledonia) |

| 21 April 2026 8 | South Melbourne (Australia) | 8–1 | (French Polynesia) Tahiti United | Ba, Fiji |
| 19:00 (FJT) | Lackay 4'; Swibel 14'; Cocks 26', 45+4'; Giannakopoulos 34'; Mesourouni 36'; Singh 69'; Burchmore 71' | (Report) (OFC) | Haewegene 62' | Stadium: Govind Park; Attendance: 124; Referee: Kavitesh Behari (Fiji) |
Note: Originally scheduled to be played in Melbourne at Home of the Matildas on 24 February 2026 during Circuit 3, but was postponed due to adverse weather in Melbourne.

==== Leaders play-off group ====
===== Leaders play-off group table =====
| Pos | Team | Pld | W | D | L | GF | GA | GD | Pts | Qualification |
|---|---|---|---|---|---|---|---|---|---|---|
| 1 | (Australia) South Melbourne | 3 | 3 | 0 | 0 | 10 | 5 | +5 | 9 | Qualification for semi-finals |
| 2 | (New Zealand) Auckland FC | 3 | 2 | 0 | 1 | 8 | 4 | +4 | 6 | Qualification for semi-finals |
| 3 | (New Zealand) South Island United | 3 | 1 | 0 | 2 | 5 | 9 | −4 | 3 | Qualification for semi-finals |
| 4 | (Fiji) Bula FC | 3 | 0 | 0 | 3 | 2 | 7 | −5 | 0 | Qualification for qualification play-off |

Source: OFC Pro League
Rules for classification: 1) Points; 2) Goal difference; 3) Goals scored; 4) Head to head; 5) Head to head goal difference; 6) Head to head goals scored; 7) Disciplinary record; 8) Coin toss

===== Results by round =====
| Round | 1 | 2 | 3 |
|---|---|---|---|
| Ground | A | H | H |
| Result | W | W | W |
| Position | 1 | 1 | 1 |
| Points | 3 | 6 | 9 |

Source: OFC Pro League
A = Away; H = Home; N = Neutral; B = Bye; W = Win; D = Draw; L = Loss; X = Bye

===== Matches =====
The fixtures were announced on 22 April 2026 .

| 6 May 2026 1 | Auckland FC (New Zealand) | 1–2 | (Australia) South Melbourne | Auckland, New Zealand |
| 19:00 (NZDT) | Zoricich 41' | (OFC) (Report) | Eliopoulos 21'; Pasquali 23' | Stadium: Mount Smart Stadium; Attendance: 426; Referee: Campbell-Kirk Kawana-Waugh (New Zealand) |

| 9 May 2026 2 | South Melbourne (Australia) | 4–2 | (New Zealand) South Island United | Auckland, New Zealand |
| 18:30 (NZDT) | Cocks 22'; Mikkola 26'; Rogerson 34' (o.g.); Swibel 45+2' | (OFC) (Report) | Feutz 17'; Fay 80' | Stadium: Eden Park; Attendance: 227; Referee: Veer Singh (Fiji) |

| 12 May 2026 3 | South Melbourne (Australia) | 4–2 | (Fiji) Bula FC | Auckland, New Zealand |
| 15:00 (NZDT) | Pope 12'; Mikkola 34' (pen.); Mesourouni 36'; Lampard 57' | (OFC) (Report) | Afazal 19'; Krishna 79' | Stadium: Eden Park; Attendance: 228; Referee: Cory Mills (New Zealand) |

==== Knockout stage ====
===== Semi-final =====
| 20 May 2026 Semi-final | South Melbourne (Australia) | 4–0 | Vanuatu United | Auckland, New Zealand |
| 13:30 (NZST) | Swibel 17'; Acton 32' (o.g.); Mikkola 39'; Giannakopoulos 57' | (OFC) (Report) | | Stadium: Mount Smart Stadium; Attendance: 214; Referee: Anna-Marie Keighley (New Zealand) |

===== Final =====
| 24 May 2026 Grand Final | South Melbourne (Australia) | 1–2 | (New Zealand) Auckland FC | Auckland, New Zealand |
| 15:00 (NZST) | Uchida 90+7' | (OFC) (Report) | Normann 23'; Ellis 72' | Stadium: Eden Park; Attendance: 3,470; Referee: Campbell-Kirk Kawana-Waugh (New Zealand) |

== Statistics ==
=== Appearances and goals ===
Includes all competitions. Two own goals scored in OFC Pro League, one own goal scored in NPL Victoria and Dockerty Cup.

As of 29 October 2026

| No. | Pos | Nat | Player | Total | | NPL Victoria | | NPL Victoria Finals | | Australian Championship | | Australia Cup | | Dockerty Cup | | OFC Pro League | |
| No. | Pos | Nat | Player | Apps | Goals | Apps | Goals | Apps | Goals | Apps | Goals | Apps | Goals | Apps | Goals | Apps | Goals |
Goalkeepers
| 1 | GK | (Spain) ESP | Javier López | 35 | 0 | 17 | 0 | 2 | 0 | 3 | 0 | 3 | 0 | 0 | 0 | 10 | 0 |
| 20 | GK | (Australia) AUS | Jake Charlston | 14 | 0 | 5 | 0 | 0 | 0 | 0 | 0 | 2 | 0 | 1 | 0 | 4+2 | 0 |
| — | GK | (Australia) AUS | Jayden Szmerling | 1 | 0 | 1 | 0 | 0 | 0 | 0 | 0 | 0 | 0 | 0 | 0 | 0 | 0 |
| — | GK | (Australia) AUS | Antonie Van Riet | 3 | 0 | 3 | 0 | 0 | 0 | 0 | 0 | 0 | 0 | 0 | 0 | 0 | 0 |
Defenders
| 3 | DF | (Australia) AUS | Jordon Lampard | 38 | 2 | 15 | 0 | 0+1 | 0 | 3 | 0 | 1+2 | 0 | 0 | 0 | 15+1 | 2 |
| 4 | DF | (Australia) AUS | Marko Janković | 45 | 3 | 20 | 1 | 2 | 0 | 3 | 0 | 5 | 0 | 0 | 0 | 12+3 | 2 |
| 5 | DF | (Australia) AUS | Hassan Ramazani | 17 | 0 | 7+1 | 0 | 2 | 0 | 0+2 | 0 | 4+1 | 0 | 0 | 0 | 0 | 0 |
| 12 | DF | (Australia) AUS | Richard Nkomo | 7 | 0 | 2+4 | 0 | 0 | 0 | 0 | 0 | 0+1 | 0 | 0 | 0 | 0 | 0 |
| 23 | DF | (Australia) AUS | Jacob Eliopoulos | 26 | 4 | 9+1 | 2 | 0+2 | 0 | 2 | 0 | 2 | 0 | 0 | 0 | 10 | 2 |
| 27 | DF | (Australia) AUS | Jack Painter-Andrews | 37 | 2 | 13+1 | 1 | 2 | 0 | 2 | 0 | 5 | 1 | 0 | 0 | 14 | 0 |
| 47 | DF | (Australia) AUS | Luca Trubiano | 2 | 0 | 1+1 | 0 | 0 | 0 | 0 | 0 | 0 | 0 | 0 | 0 | 0 | 0 |
| — | DF | (Australia) AUS | Oliver Anset | 1 | 0 | 0+1 | 0 | 0 | 0 | 0 | 0 | 0 | 0 | 0 | 0 | 0 | 0 |
Midfielders
| 6 | MF | (Australia) AUS | Sam Fawcett | 1 | 0 | 0+1 | 0 | 0 | 0 | 0 | 0 | 0 | 0 | 0 | 0 | 0 | 0 |
| 8 | MF | (Australia) AUS | Paulo Retre | 14 | 0 | 1+3 | 0 | 2 | 0 | 2+1 | 0 | 4+1 | 0 | 0 | 0 | 0 | 0 |
| 12 | MF | (Australia) AUS | Joseph Pezzano | 4 | 0 | 1+3 | 0 | 0 | 0 | 0 | 0 | 0 | 0 | 0 | 0 | 0 | 0 |
| 14 | MF | (Australia) AUS | Alex Menelaou | 22 | 0 | 5+3 | 0 | 0 | 0 | 0 | 0 | 0 | 0 | 2 | 0 | 9+3 | 0 |
| 17 | MF | (Australia) AUS | Thomas Giannakopoulos | 43 | 6 | 17+1 | 2 | 1 | 0 | 2+1 | 1 | 5 | 0 | 0 | 0 | 15+1 | 3 |
| 19 | MF | (Australia) AUS | Andrew Mesourouni | 41 | 11 | 7+10 | 3 | 0+1 | 0 | 0+1 | 0 | 0+3 | 0 | 2 | 2 | 7+10 | 6 |
| 21 | MF | (Australia) AUS | Sebastian Pasquali | 42 | 2 | 19 | 1 | 2 | 0 | 3 | 0 | 5 | 0 | 0 | 0 | 13 | 1 |
| 22 | MF | (Australia) AUS | Max Mikkola | 35 | 12 | 12+3 | 4 | 0+1 | 0 | 0+2 | 0 | 0+3 | 1 | 0 | 0 | 13+1 | 7 |
| 40 | MF | (Australia) AUS | Oliver Pert | 3 | 0 | 1+2 | 0 | 0 | 0 | 0 | 0 | 0 | 0 | 0 | 0 | 0 | 0 |
| 44 | MF | (Australia) AUS | Lee Papastergiadis | 2 | 0 | 0+2 | 0 | 0 | 0 | 0 | 0 | 0 | 0 | 0 | 0 | 0 | 0 |
| 50 | MF | (Australia) AUS | Jake Brown | 5 | 0 | 4+1 | 0 | 0 | 0 | 0 | 0 | 0 | 0 | 0 | 0 | 0 | 0 |
| — | MF | (Australia) AUS | Ramiro Lamadrid | 1 | 0 | 0+1 | 0 | 0 | 0 | 0 | 0 | 0 | 0 | 0 | 0 | 0 | 0 |
| — | MF | (Australia) AUS | Nicholas Stefanidakis | 1 | 0 | 0+1 | 0 | 0 | 0 | 0 | 0 | 0 | 0 | 0 | 0 | 0 | 0 |
Forwards
| 7 | FW | (New Zealand) NZL | David Yoo | 18 | 3 | 6+2 | 1 | 2 | 1 | 2+1 | 0 | 5 | 1 | 0 | 0 | 0 | 0 |
| 9 | FW | (New Zealand) NZL | Kosta Barbarouses | 3 | 0 | 0 | 0 | 0 | 0 | 1+2 | 0 | 0 | 0 | 0 | 0 | 0 | 0 |
| 15 | FW | (Australia) AUS | Jordan Swibel | 43 | 16 | 13+4 | 5 | 0+2 | 0 | 2+1 | 2 | 0+4 | 0 | 0 | 0 | 15+2 | 9 |
| 10 | FW | (South Sudan) SSD | Bul Juach | 17 | 9 | 4+3 | 2 | 2 | 2 | 1+2 | 0 | 4+1 | 5 | 0 | 0 | 0 | 0 |
| 37 | FW | (Australia) AUS | George Saristavros | 7 | 1 | 4+3 | 1 | 0 | 0 | 0 | 0 | 0 | 0 | 0 | 0 | 0 | 0 |
| 11 | FW | (Japan) JPN | Yuki Uchida | 43 | 11 | 16+1 | 2 | 2 | 0 | 3 | 1 | 5 | 1 | 0 | 0 | 15+1 | 7 |
| 13 | FW | (Australia) AUS | James Lackay | 38 | 2 | 5+11 | 0 | 0 | 0 | 1+1 | 0 | 0+3 | 0 | 0+2 | 0 | 4+11 | 2 |
| 16 | FW | (Australia) AUS | Arran Cocks | 48 | 9 | 11+6 | 3 | 2 | 0 | 3 | 0 | 5 | 2 | 2 | 0 | 10+9 | 4 |
| 18 | FW | (Australia) AUS | Andre Skapoulas | 14 | 1 | 6+5 | 1 | 0 | 0 | 0 | 0 | 0+1 | 0 | 2 | 0 | 0 | 0 |
| 35 | FW | (Australia) AUS | Noah Grieve | 5 | 0 | 2+3 | 0 | 0 | 0 | 0 | 0 | 0 | 0 | 0 | 0 | 0 | 0 |
| 36 | FW | (Australia) AUS | Matthew Di Lorenzo | 5 | 0 | 5 | 0 | 0 | 0 | 0 | 0 | 0 | 0 | 0 | 0 | 0 | 0 |
| 42 | FW | (Australia) AUS | Ricardo Kunfunda | 4 | 0 | 2+2 | 0 | 0 | 0 | 0 | 0 | 0 | 0 | 0 | 0 | 0 | 0 |
Players who left during the season
| 2 | DF | (Australia) AUS | Lucas Inglese | 19 | 1 | 3+2 | 0 | 0 | 0 | 0 | 0 | 0 | 0 | 2 | 0 | 6+6 | 1 |
| 7 | FW | (New Zealand) NZL | Ishveer Singh | 14 | 2 | 1+2 | 1 | 0 | 0 | 0 | 0 | 0 | 0 | 1+1 | 0 | 2+7 | 1 |
| 8 | DF | (New Zealand) NZL | Luka Coveny | 11 | 0 | 0+1 | 0 | 0 | 0 | 0 | 0 | 0 | 0 | 2 | 0 | 6+2 | 0 |
| 15 | DF | (Australia) AUS | Che Gorr Burchmore | 9 | 1 | 2 | 0 | 0 | 0 | 0 | 0 | 0 | 0 | 0+1 | 0 | 4+2 | 1 |
| 24 | FW | (Argentina) ARG | Nahuel Bonada | 28 | 7 | 12+2 | 5 | 0 | 0 | 0 | 0 | 0 | 0 | 0 | 0 | 11+3 | 2 |
| 26 | FW | (Australia) AUS | Campbell Dovison | 10 | 1 | 8 | 1 | 0 | 0 | 0 | 0 | 0 | 0 | 2 | 0 | 0 | 0 |
| 28 | MF | (Australia) AUS | Thierry Papadimitriou | 9 | 0 | 6+2 | 0 | 0 | 0 | 0 | 0 | 0 | 0 | 0+1 | 0 | 0 | 0 |
| 30 | GK | (Australia) AUS | Iliya Shalamanov-Trenkov | 6 | 0 | 0 | 0 | 0 | 0 | 0 | 0 | 0 | 0 | 1 | 0 | 5 | 0 |
| 31 | MF | (Australia) AUS | Ethan O’Sullivan | 11 | 0 | 5+3 | 0 | 0 | 0 | 0 | 0 | 0 | 0 | 2 | 0 | 1 | 0 |
| 34 | FW | (Australia) AUS | Thomas Killick | 7 | 0 | 0+7 | 0 | 0 | 0 | 0 | 0 | 0 | 0 | 0 | 0 | 0 | 0 |
| 39 | MF | (Australia) AUS | Gerry Angelatos | 8 | 0 | 4+2 | 0 | 0 | 0 | 0 | 0 | 0 | 0 | 0+2 | 0 | 0 | 0 |
| 49 | MF | (Australia) AUS | Angus Angelatos | 8 | 0 | 6+1 | 0 | 0 | 0 | 0 | 0 | 0 | 0 | 0+1 | 0 | 0 | 0 |
| 88 | MF | (Australia) AUS | Charlie Leech | 22 | 4 | 2+5 | 2 | 0 | 0 | 0 | 0 | 0 | 0 | 2 | 0 | 3+10 | 2 |
| 99 | MF | (Australia) AUS | Jack Pope | 19 | 2 | 1+4 | 1 | 0 | 0 | 0 | 0 | 0 | 0 | 1+1 | 0 | 5+7 | 1 |
| — | MF | (Australia) AUS | Luca Durso | 4 | 0 | 2+1 | 0 | 0 | 0 | 0 | 0 | 0 | 0 | 0+1 | 0 | 0 | 0 |

- Source: South Melbourne

=== Clean sheets ===
Includes all competitive matches. The list is sorted by squad number when total clean sheets are equal. Numbers in parentheses represent games where both goalkeepers participated and both kept a clean sheet; the number in parentheses is awarded to the goalkeeper who was substituted on, whilst a full clean sheet is awarded to the goalkeeper who was on the field at the start of play. Goalkeepers with no clean sheets not included in the list.

As of 29 October 2026

| Rank | No. | Player | NPL Victoria | NPL Victoria Finals | Australian Championship | Australia Cup | Dockerty Cup | OFC Pro League | Total |
|---|---|---|---|---|---|---|---|---|---|
| 1 | 1 | (Spain) Javier López | 7 | 0 | 2 | 0 | 0 | 3 | 12 |
| 2 | 20 | (Australia) Jake Charlston | 3 | 0 | 0 | 0 | 0 | 0 (1) | 3 (1) |
| 3 | 30 | (Australia) Iliya Shalamanov-Trenkov | 0 | 0 | 0 | 0 | 0 | 1 | 1 |
| Total | | | 10 | 0 | 2 | 0 | 0 | 4 | 16 |

=== Disciplinary record ===
Includes all competitions. The list is sorted by squad number when total cards are equal. Players with no cards not included in the list.

As of 15 March 2026

| No. | Pos. | Player | NPL Victoria | | | Australian Championship | | | Australia Cup | | | Dockerty Cup | | | OFC Pro League | | | Total | | |
| No. | Pos. | Player | Yellow card | Second yellow card | Red card | Yellow card | Second yellow card | Red card | Yellow card | Second yellow card | Red card | Yellow card | Second yellow card | Red card | Yellow card | Second yellow card | Red card | Yellow card | Second yellow card | Red card |
|---|---|---|---|---|---|---|---|---|---|---|---|---|---|---|---|---|---|---|---|---|
| 9 | FW | (Australia) Jordan Swibel | 2 | 0 | 0 | 0 | 0 | 0 | 0 | 0 | 0 | 0 | 0 | 0 | 1 | 0 | 0 | 3 | 0 | 0 |
| 17 | MF | (Australia) Thomas Giannakopoulos | 1 | 0 | 0 | 0 | 0 | 0 | 0 | 0 | 0 | 0 | 0 | 0 | 2 | 0 | 0 | 3 | 0 | 0 |
| 21 | MF | (Australia) Sebastian Pasquali | 2 | 0 | 0 | 0 | 0 | 0 | 0 | 0 | 0 | 0 | 0 | 0 | 1 | 0 | 0 | 3 | 0 | 0 |
| 88 | MF | (Australia) Charlie Leech | 1 | 0 | 0 | 0 | 0 | 0 | 0 | 0 | 0 | 0 | 0 | 0 | 2 | 0 | 0 | 3 | 0 | 0 |
| 4 | DF | (Australia) Marco Janković | 1 | 0 | 0 | 0 | 0 | 0 | 0 | 0 | 0 | 0 | 0 | 0 | 1 | 0 | 0 | 2 | 0 | 0 |
| 31 | MF | (Australia) Ethan O’Sullivan | 2 | 0 | 0 | 0 | 0 | 0 | 0 | 0 | 0 | 0 | 0 | 0 | 0 | 0 | 0 | 2 | 0 | 0 |
| 2 | DF | (Australia) Lucas Inglese | 1 | 0 | 0 | 0 | 0 | 0 | 0 | 0 | 0 | 0 | 0 | 0 | 0 | 0 | 0 | 1 | 0 | 0 |
| 3 | DF | (Australia) Jordon Lampard | 0 | 0 | 0 | 0 | 0 | 0 | 0 | 0 | 0 | 0 | 0 | 0 | 1 | 0 | 0 | 1 | 0 | 0 |
| 11 | FW | (Japan) Yuki Uchida | 0 | 0 | 0 | 0 | 0 | 0 | 0 | 0 | 0 | 0 | 0 | 0 | 1 | 0 | 0 | 1 | 0 | 0 |
| 14 | MF | (Australia) Alex Menelaou | 0 | 0 | 0 | 0 | 0 | 0 | 0 | 0 | 0 | 0 | 0 | 0 | 1 | 0 | 0 | 1 | 0 | 0 |
| 23 | DF | (Australia) Jacob Eliopoulos | 0 | 0 | 0 | 0 | 0 | 0 | 0 | 0 | 0 | 0 | 0 | 0 | 1 | 0 | 0 | 1 | 0 | 0 |
| 24 | FW | (Argentina) Nahuel Bonada | 1 | 0 | 0 | 0 | 0 | 0 | 0 | 0 | 0 | 0 | 0 | 0 | 0 | 0 | 0 | 1 | 0 | 0 |
| 99 | MF | (Australia) Jack Pope | 0 | 0 | 0 | 0 | 0 | 0 | 0 | 0 | 0 | 0 | 0 | 0 | 1 | 0 | 0 | 1 | 0 | 0 |
| Total | | | 8 | 0 | 0 | 0 | 0 | 0 | 0 | 0 | 0 | 0 | 0 | 0 | 12 | 0 | 0 | 20 | 0 | 0 |

== Awards ==
=== Players ===
| No. | Pos. | Player | Award | Source |
|---|---|---|---|---|
| 3 | DF | (Australia) Jordon Lampard | OFC Pro League Team of the Season | |
| 4 | DF | (Australia) Marco Janković | Michael Cockerill Medal | |
| 9 | FW | (Australia) Jordan Swibel | OFC Pro League Team of the Season | |
| 10 | FW | (South Sudan) Bul Juach | Australia Cup Top Goalscorer | |
| 11 | FW | (Japan) Yuki Uchida | OFC Pro League Team of the Season | |
| 16 | FW | (Australia) Arran Cocks | NPL Victoria Young Team of the Season (substitute) | |
| 17 | DF | (Australia) Thomas Giannakopoulos | NPL Victoria Young Team of the Season (captain) | |
| 17 | DF | (Australia) Thomas Giannakopoulos | NPL Victoria Rising Star – July | |
| 21 | MF | (Australia) Sebastian Pasquali | NPL Victoria Team of the Season (substitute) | |
| 22 | MF | (Australia) Max Mikkola | OFC Pro League Team of the Season (substitute) | |
