= David Yoo (footballer) =

New Zealand footballer (born 1999)

Personal information
- Full name: David Seung Ho Yoo
- Date of birth: 7 December 1999 (age 26)
- Place of birth: Seoul, South Korea
- Height: 1.81 m (5 ft 11 in)
- Position: Forward

Team information
- Current team: South Melbourne
- Number: 7

Youth career
- Wellington Phoenix
- –2018: Eastern Suburbs

Senior career*
Years	Team	Apps	(Gls)
2018–2019	Rio Ave B		
2019–2022	Padroense		
2021	→ Oliveira do Douro (loan)		
2022–2023	Leça	21	(1)
2024	Christchurch United	15	(11)
2024	Coastal Spirit	9	(6)
2025	Auckland City	28	(8)
2026	South Island United (OFC)	18	(4)
2026	South Melbourne	8	(1)
- * Club domestic league appearances and goals as of 29 August 2026

David Seung Ho Yoo (born 7 December 1999) is a New Zealand professional footballer, born in South Korea, who plays as a midfielder for South Melbourne in NPL Victoria.

== Club career ==
=== Early career ===
Yoo played youth football in Christchurch and joined the Asia Pacific Football Academy which was associated with Chelsea, at age 11 or 12. Yoo joined the Wellington Phoenix Academy for a few years, but struggled with growing pains, including pain in the knees and joints. At age 15, he decided to return home to Christchurch. Yoo moved to Auckland towards the end of his high schooling, before moving to Portugal at age 18.

=== Portugal ===
After trailing with Rio Ave B, Yoo signed for them for the 2018–19 season. Yoo spent a season there before joining Padroense for three seasons. Towards the end of the 2020–21 season, Yoo was loaned out to Oliveira do Douro. In July 2022, Yoo signed with Leça, where he spent one season, before returning home to New Zealand.

=== New Zealand ===
Following his return to New Zealand, Yoo signed with Christchurch United for the 2024 Southern League season. He was named MVP after scoring 10 goals. Following the conclusion of the Southern League, Yoo signed for Coastal Spirit for the National League Championship.

On 15 January 2025, Yoo signed for Auckland City for the 2025 Northern League. In June 2025, Yoo was named in Auckland City's squad for the 2025 FIFA Club World Cup, the club's tenth appearance in the tournament. He played all three group games including the 1–1 draw with Boca Juniors. This was their first non-defeated result since the 2014 edition.

On 17 November 2025, Yoo signed for South Island United for the 2026 OFC Professional League season and was the first player to join the club.

=== Australia ===
On 24 June 2026, Yoo Signed for South Melbourne for the remainder of the 2026 NPL Victoria season.

== Career statistics ==
=== Club ===
As of match played 23 October 2026

Appearances and goals by club, season and competition
Club	Season	League			National Cup		Continental		Other		Total	
Club	Season	Division	Apps	Goals	Apps	Goals	Apps	Goals	Apps	Goals	Apps	Goals
Leça	2022–23	Campeonato de Portugal	0	0	1	0	—		—		1	0
Christchurch United	2024	National League	15	11	2	3	—		1 (Note: Appearance in Charity Cup)	0	18	14
Coastal Spirit	2024	National League	9	6	0	0	—		—		9	6
Auckland City	2025	National League	28	8	0	0	4	0	4 (Note: Three appearances in FIFA Club World Cup; one appearance in FIFA Intercontinental Cup)	0	36	8
South Island United	2026	—			—		18 (Note: South Island United solely compete in OFC Professional League)	4	—		18	4
South Melbourne	2026	NPL Victoria	8	1	5	1	0	0	4 (Note: Two goals appearances and one goal in NPL Victoria Finals; two appearances in Australian Championship)	1	17	3
Career total			60	26	8	4	22	4	9	1	99	35

== Personal life ==
As a semi-professional footballer, Yoo also worked as a community football coach at a number of Auckland schools.

== Honours ==
Auckland City

- OFC Champions League: 2025
- National League: 2025

South Melbourne FC

- Australia Cup: 2026

Individual

- Southern League MVP: 2024
- National League Team of the Season: 2024, 2025
- OFC Professional League Team of the Season: 2026 (substitute)
