= Steven van Dijk (footballer) =

Dutch footballer (born 1997)

Personal information
- Date of birth: 1 September 1997 (age 29)
- Place of birth: Apeldoorn, Netherlands
- Height: 1.91 m (6 ft 3 in)
- Position: Goalkeeper

Team information
- Current team: Sisaket United
- Number: 77

Youth career
- –2012: Go Ahead Eagles
- 2012–2013: SBV Vitesse
- 2013–2014: WSV Apeldoorn
- 2014–2017: Go Ahead Eagles
- 2017–2018: NEC Nijmegen

Senior career*
Years	Team	Apps	(Gls)
2018–2019	FC Den Bosch	0	(0)
2019–2020	FC Lienden	0	(0)
2020–2021	HSC '21	0	(0)
2021	Vestri	1	(0)
2022	The Cove		
2023	07 Vestur	0	(0)
2023	→ 07 Vestur II (loan)	9	(0)
2023	→ EB/Streymur (loan)	10	(0)
2024–2025	Christchurch United	42	(0)
2026	South Island United	17	(0)
2026–	Sisaket United	0	(0)
- * Club domestic league appearances and goals as of 21 May 2025

Steven van Dijk (born 1 September 1997) is a Dutch professional footballer who plays as a goalkeeper for Thai League 1 club Sisaket United.

== Early life ==
Van Dijk was born on 1 September 1997 in Apeldoorn, Netherlands and is a native of the city.

== Career ==
During the summer of 2021, van Dijk signed for Icelandic side Vestri, where he made one league appearance. Six months later, he signed for Australia side The Cove.

Following his stint there, he signed for Faroese side 07 Vestur, where he failed to make a league appearance. The same year, he was sent on loan to Faroese side EB/Streymur, where he made ten league appearances. Ahead of the 2024 season, he signed for New Zealand side Christchurch United.

On 11 September 2026, van Dijk announced he had signed for Thai League 1 club Sisaket United.

== Style of play ==
Van Dijk plays as a goalkeeper. Growing up, he played as a forward before switching to goalkeeper.

== Honours ==
Individual

- OFC Professional League Team of the Season: 2026 (substitute)
