= Dauntae Mariner =

Samoan footballer

Personal information
- Full name: Dauntae Peña Mariner
- Date of birth: 25 January 2000 (age 26)
- Place of birth: Campbelltown, Australia
- Height: 1.78 m (5 ft 10 in)
- Position: Forward

Team information
- Current team: South Island United
- Number: 14

Youth career
- 2013–2016: Brisbane Strikers
- 2016–2017: Blackburn Rovers
- 2017–2019: Vizela
- 2019–2020: Brisbane Roar
- 2021: Western Sydney Wanderers

Senior career*
Years	Team	Apps	(Gls)
2021	Gold Coast Knights	17	(1)
2022	Logan Lightning	33	(2)
2023	Brisbane Strikers	13	(2)
2024–2025	Nelson Suburbs	26	(4)
2026–	South Island United	15	(0)

International career^{‡}
2023–	Samoa	13	(0)
- * Club domestic league appearances and goals as of 21 May 2025 ‡ National team caps and goals as of 18 November 2024

Dauntae Mariner (born 25 January 2000) is a Samoan soccer player who plays as a midfielder for OFC Professional League club South Island United and the Samoa national team.

== Club career ==
=== Youth ===
Mariner began playing football at age six. As a youth he played for Mounties Wanderers FC and Macarthur Rams FC. He and his family moved from Sydney to Brisbane to play for Brisbane Strikers in 2013. After three years at the club, he went on trial with Blackburn Rovers of the English Championship. In May 2016 it was announced that he would join the club on a two-year deal. Mariner was originally spotted by Blackburn as he toured England with an Australian schoolboy team. He was also invited to trials by Middlesbrough and Wolverhampton Wanderers.

In February 2018 Mariner was announced as one of several players signed to FC Vizela of the Portuguese Campeonato, the second tier of football in the country. The following year he returned to Australia and joined the under-19 side of the A-League's Brisbane Roar. On matchday nineteen he scored a hat-trick against Sunshine Coast in his first match of the season with the club. Following the season he moved to the academy of fellow A-League club Western Sydney Wanderers.

=== Senior ===
In the 2021 FFA Cup, Mariner scored a goal for Gold Coast Knights less than a minute after entering the match to defeat Edge Hill United and progress to the Round of 16. For the 2022 season he moved to Logan Lightning FC of the same league.

== International career ==
Born in Australia, Mariner is of Samoan heritage. He visited Samoa for the first time in January 2017 to trial for the Samoa under-17 national team that would compete in the 2017 OFC U-17 Championship. Later that month he was named to Samoa's final squad. Mariner made his debut for the senior Samoa national team on 17 November 2023 in a 2023 Pacific Games match against the Solomon Islands.

=== International career statistics ===
As of 18 November 2024

Samoa national team
Year	Apps	Goals
2023	3	0
2024	10	0
Total	13	0

== Personal life ==
Mariner is the nephew of Tim Cahill and the cousin of Kyah Cahill.
