= Bul Juach =

South Sudanese footballer (born 2000)

Personal information
- Full name: Bul Juach
- Date of birth: 1 December 2000 (age 25)
- Place of birth: South Sudan
- Height: 1.87 m (6 ft 2 in)
- Position: Forward

Team information
- Current team: South Melbourne
- Number: 10

Youth career
- Canberra United Academy

Senior career*
Years	Team	Apps	(Gls)
2018–2019	Canberra United Academy	8	(1)
2019–2020	Wollongong Wolves	17	(4)
2021	Bulls FC Academy	14	(3)
2022	Mt Druitt Town Rangers	19	(6)
2023	FC Dobrudzha Dobrich	4	(0)
2024	Altona Magic	26	(14)
2025	Heidelberg United	40	(29)
2026	Pacific FC	8	(1)
2026–	South Melbourne	9	(4)
- * Club domestic league appearances and goals as of 1 July 2026 ‡ National team caps and goals as of 21 November 2023

Bul Juach (born 1 December 2000) is a South Sudanese footballer who plays as a striker for NPL Victoria club South Melbourne.

== Early life ==
Juach was born in South Sudan, however his family fled the country due to the South Sudanese Civil War. Raised in the Kenyan Kakuma Refugee Camp, the family immigrated to Australia as refugees with Juach aged 12. Upon arriving in Australia, the family settled in Canberra, Australian Capital Territory.

== Club career ==
Juach first signed for Canberra United in the National Youth League, before signing a contract with NPL NSW club Wollongong Wolves under former Socceroo Luke Wilkshire.

Following several strong performances at NPL level, Juach was scouted by A-League clubs, before signing a contract with Macarthur FC's academy side Northbridge Bulls under Mile Sterjovski

Juach travelled overseas and had a short stint with Bulgarian Second Division club FC Dobrudzha Dobrich, before returning to Australia and signing with National Premier Leagues Victoria club Altona Magic

After joining South Melbourne FC in 2026, Juach made an immediate impact in the Australia Cup, scoring against both Adelaide United and Fremantle City. In the semi-final against Lions FC, Juach scored a hat-trick in a 3–1 win, sending South Melbourne to the Australia Cup final for the first time in club history.

== International career ==
Juach has expressed interest in representing either Australia or South Sudan at international level.

== Honours ==
South Melbourne FC

- Australia Cup: 2026
