= Rob Sherman (football manager) =

Welsh footballer and manager (born 1960)

Personal information
- Full name: Robert Sherman
- Date of birth: 21 August 1960 (age 66)
- Place of birth: Aberystwyth, Wales
- Position: Left winger

Senior career*
Years	Team	Apps	(Gls)
1975–1976	Aberystwyth Reserves		
1975–1980	Cardiff City		
1979–1980	Swansea		
1980–1981	Hull		

Managerial career
- 2000–2007: Wales U16
- 2011–2013: Canada Women (assistant)
- 2019–2020: Canada (assistant)
- 2023–2025: Fiji
- 2023–2025: Fiji U23
- 2026: South Island United
Medal record
Men's football
Representing Fiji (as manager)
Pacific Games
Bronze medal – third place	2023 Solomon Islands
- * Club domestic league appearances and goals

Robert Sherman (born 21 August 1960) is a Welsh professional football manager and former player, who was most recently manager of OFC Professional League club South Island United. From 2023 to 2025 he was the head coach of the Fiji national team.

== Early life and education ==
Sherman grew up in Aberystwyth, Wales. He attended Ysgol Penglais School in Wales.

== Playing career ==
Sherman made his senior debut for Aberystwyth Reserves at age 15 and for the first team at 16. He moved to Cardiff City at 16 and spent three years with the club, before brief spells with Swansea and Hull. He primarily played as a left-winger.

== Managerial career ==
Sherman has been described as a "highly respected figure in football and coaching education globally".

=== Wales ===
Sherman joined the Football Association of Wales in 1997 as an Area Coach, later becoming National Player Development Manager and Technical Director. He helped nurture talents such as Gareth Bale and Aaron Ramsey.

=== New Zealand ===
Sherman served as Technical Director for New Zealand Football, overseeing development programs and contributing to the growth of football in the country.

=== Australia ===
In July 2018, Sherman joined Melbourne Victory FC as Technical Director, managing the National Premier League, Youth League, Women's, and Academy programs.

In April 2019, he was appointed National Technical Director at Football Federation Australia, responsible for overseeing the National Football Curriculum, Pathways, Competitions, National Teams, Coach Development, and Participation. He resigned in March 2020, citing organizational challenges.

=== Oceania ===
In 2022, Sherman joined the Oceania Football Confederation as High Performance Consultant, assisting with regional football development programs.

=== Fiji ===
In May 2023, Sherman was appointed head coach of Fiji, overseeing the national team's strategy and performance.

He has also signed to become head coach of Christchurch United for the OFC Pro League.

== Coaching philosophy ==
Sherman advocates a player-centered approach, focusing on individual development within team dynamics. He shares his philosophy to educate and inspire coaches globally.

== Personal life ==
Sherman is the father of Welsh football manager Drew Sherman.

=== Managerial record ===
As of match played 20 November 2025

Managerial record by team and tenure
Team	Nat	From	To	Record					Ref.
Team	Nat	From	To	G	W	D	L	Win %	Ref.
Fiji		2023	2025	22	9	4	9	40.91	
Career Total				22	9	4	9	40.91	—

== Honours ==
=== Manager ===
Fiji

- Pacific Games: Bronze Medalist, 2023
