= Jackson Manuel =

New Zealand footballer (born 2003)

Personal information
- Full name: Jackson John Manuel
- Date of birth: 24 February 2003 (age 23)
- Place of birth: New Zealand
- Height: 1.78 m (5 ft 10 in)
- Position: Midfielder

Team information
- Current team: Western Springs
- Number: 8

Youth career
- Wellington Phoenix

Senior career*
Years	Team	Apps	(Gls)
2018	Wellington Phoenix II	3	(0)
2019–2020	Tasman United	7	(0)
2020–2021	North Wellington	24	(2)
2021	Lower Hutt City	5	(1)
2021–2023	Wellington Phoenix II	10	(1)
2022	Wellington Phoenix	5	(0)
2023	Western Springs	12	(0)
2023	Wellington Phoenix II	5	(0)
2023	Wellington Phoenix	1	(0)
2024	Western Springs	19	(3)
2025	Auckland City	12	(0)
2026	South Island United	17	(0)
2026–	Western Springs	1	(0)

International career
2018	New Zealand U17	4	(0)
- * Club domestic league appearances and goals as of 11 July 2026

Jackson John Manuel (born 24 February 2003) is a professional New Zealand footballer who plays as a midfielder for National League club Western Springs.

== Career ==
Manuel was first called up to the Wellington Phoenix first team in December 2021, but did not appear for the club until 19 March 2022, making his debut in a 4–0 loss to Newcastle Jets.

On 30 June 2026, Manuel signed back for Western Springs alongside his brother, Riley.

== Personal life ==
Manuel is of Ngāti Porou and Spanish descent. He attended St Patrick's College.
