= Rovu Boyers =

Solomon Islander footballer (born 2003)

Personal information
- Full name: Rovu Ernest Boyers
- Date of birth: 19 April 2003 (age 23)
- Place of birth: Munda, Solomon Islands
- Height: 1.80 m (5 ft 11 in)
- Position: Midfielder

Team information
- Current team: South Island United
- Number: 22

Youth career
- 2021: Eastbourne United
- 2021–2022: Eastbourne Borough

Senior career*
Years	Team	Apps	(Gls)
2021–2022	Hollington United	7	(5)
2022–2023	Episkopi		
2023–2024	Syrianska		
2025	West Adelaide	25	(12)
2026–	South Island United	12	(6)

International career^{‡}
2024–	Solomon Islands	6	(3)
Medal record
Representing Solomon Islands
MSG Prime Minister's Cup
Third place	2024 Solomon Islands
- * Club domestic league appearances and goals as of 21 May 2026 ‡ National team caps and goals as of 12:48, 8 September 2025 (UTC)

Rovu Boyers (born 19 April 2003) is a Solomon Islander footballer who plays as an attacking midfielder for South Island United and the Solomon Islands national team.

== Club career ==
As a youth, Rovu played for the Royals Football Academy. He left the Solomon Islands in 2018 to join the Star Football Academy in Europe while attending Wentworth International College on a scholarship. Through SFA, he landed at several clubs in England, including Eastbourne United, Hollington United and Eastbourne Borough. He then had stints in Greece with Episkopi and with Syrianska in Sweden. After five years abroad, Boyers returned to Australia in 2023 to reconnect with family.

Boyers played one season for West Adelaide in the State League South Australia, joining the club in 2025. During the season, he was a prolific scorer with twelve league tallies for the club. In late December 2025, it was announced that Boyers had signed for South Island United FC of the OFC Professional League for the league's inaugural season. Boyers scored a hat-trick in a 4–1 victory over PNG Hekari FC on 14 March 2026. In the process, he became the first-ever player to score at least three goals in a single match in league history.

== International career ==
Boyers received his first senior international call-up for the Solomon Islands in November 2024 for a 2026 FIFA World Cup qualification match against New Caledonia. He scored his first senior international goal against Vanuatu in the 2024 MSG Prime Minister's Cup in December 2024.

=== International goals ===
Scores and results list the Solomon Islands' goal tally first.

No.	Date	Venue	Opponent	Score	Result	Competition
1.	9 December 2024	Lawson Tama Stadium, Honiara, Solomon Islands	Vanuatu	1–0	4–2	2024 MSG Prime Minister's Cup
2.	9 December 2024	Lawson Tama Stadium, Honiara, Solomon Islands	Vanuatu	3–0	4–2	2024 MSG Prime Minister's Cup
3.	18 December 2024	National Stadium, Honiara, Solomon Islands	Papua New Guinea	1–0	2–3	2024 MSG Prime Minister's Cup
Last updated 12 December 2024

== Honours ==
Solomon Islands

- MSG Prime Minister's Cup: 3rd place, 2024
