= Iliya Shalamanov-Trenkov =

Australian footballer

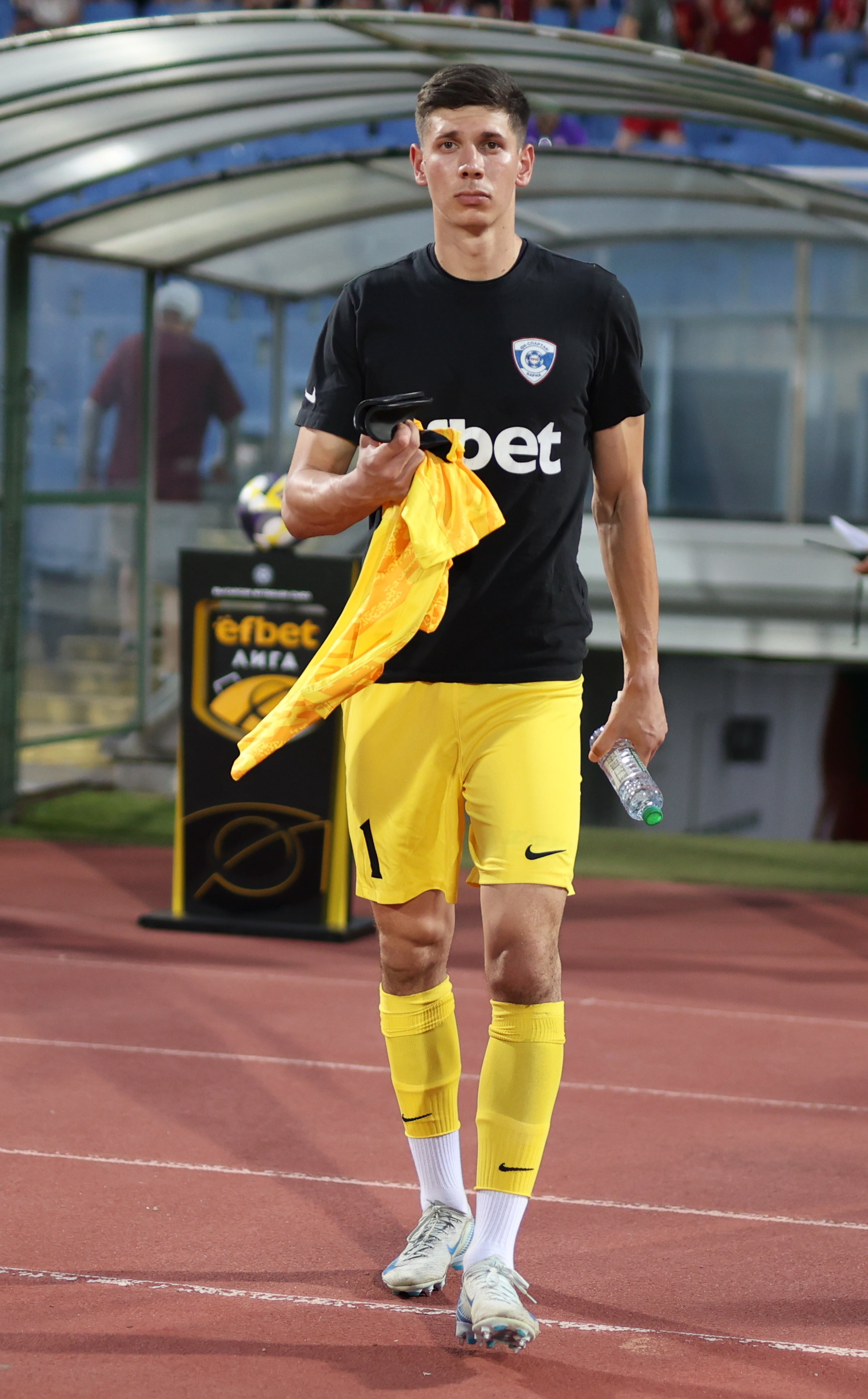

Personal information
- Full name: Iliya Stoyanov Shalamanov-Trenkov
- Date of birth: 7 August 2002 (age 24)
- Place of birth: Brisbane, Australia
- Height: 1.95 m (6 ft 5 in)
- Position: Goalkeeper

Team information
- Current team: Altona Magic
- Number: 21

Youth career
- –2014: Belasitsa Petrich
- 2014–2020: CSKA Sofia

Senior career*
Years	Team	Apps	(Gls)
2020–2023	CSKA Sofia	0	(0)
2020–2022	→ Litex (loan)	35	(0)
2022–2023	→ CSKA Sofia II	6	(0)
2024	Port Melbourne	15	(0)
2025	Altona Magic	6	(0)
2025	Spartak Varna	0	(0)
2026–	South Melbourne FC	0	(0)
2026	→ Altona Magic (loan)	2	(0)
- * Club domestic league appearances and goals as of 14 August 2026 (UTC)

Iliya Stoyanov Shalamanov-Trenkov (Bulgarian: Илия Шаламанов-Тренков; born 7 August 2002) is an Australian professional footballer who plays as a goalkeeper for Altona Magic on loan from South Melbourne FC in the National Premier Leagues Victoria, a semi-professional soccer league in Victoria, Australia.
