= 2026 Australia Cup =

2026 season of Australia's national knockout soccer competition

Tournament details
- Country: Australia
- Dates: 31 January 2026–10 October 2026
- Teams: 777 in total 32 (main competition)

Final positions
- Champions: South Melbourne (1st title)
- Runners-up: Melbourne Victory

Tournament statistics
- Matches played: 31
- Goals scored: 96 (3.1 per match)
- Attendance: 98,640 (3,182 per match)

The 2026 Australia Cup (known as the Hahn Australia Cup for sponsorship reasons) was the 13th season of the Australia Cup, the main national soccer knockout cup competition in Australia. Thirty-two teams contest the competition proper.

All eligible A-League Men clubs entered at the Round of 32. The qualifying competition began on 31 January, with the competition proper starting in July 2026.

New Zealand-based A-League Men clubs Wellington Phoenix and Auckland FC were excluded from the competition for the first time, to align with the Asian Football Confederation's qualification requirements for the AFC Champions League Two (ACL2).

Newcastle Jets were the defending champions, but were knocked out in the Round of 32.

South Melbourne won their first ever title, defeating Melbourne Victory 4–3 on penalties after a 1–1 draw after extra time. South Melbourne, a former National Soccer League (NSL) club playing in the National Premier Leagues Victoria (NPL Victoria) and the Australian Championship, became the first side outside the A-League Men to win the title. They also became the first side from outside the top flight to qualify for Asian football, qualifying for the ACL2 for the 2027–28 season. It was also Melbourne Victory's fourth consecutive loss in a final.

== Round and dates ==
Round	Draw date	Match dates	Number of fixtures	Teams	New entries this round
Preliminary rounds	Various	31 January – 17 June		777 → 32	766
Round of 32	22 June	14–30 July	16	32 → 16	11
Round of 16	30 July	8–12 August	8	16 → 8	None
Quarter-finals	30 July	18–26 August	4	8 → 4	None
Semi-finals	30 July	9–15 September	2	4 → 2	None
Final	—	10 October	1	2 → 1	None

== Preliminary rounds ==
Member federation teams competed in various state-based preliminary rounds to win places in the competition proper (from the Round of 32). All Australian clubs (other than youth teams associated with A-League franchises) were eligible to enter the qualifying process through their respective member federation; however, only one team per club was permitted entry into the competition. (Note: This included Western United, who entered their youth team in the Victorian preliminary rounds, as the club's A-League licence was then dormant.) The preliminary rounds operated within a consistent national structure, whereby club entry into the competition is staggered in each state/territory, determined by what level the club sits at in the unofficial Australian soccer league system.

All ten Australian A-League Men clubs gained automatic qualification to the Round of 32. South Melbourne qualified automatically as winners of the 2025 Australian Championship.

Federation	Associated competition	Round of 32 qualifiers
Football Australia	A-League Men	10
Football Australia	Australian Championship	1
Capital Football (ACT)	Federation Cup (ACT)	1
Football NSW	Waratah Cup	4
Northern NSW Football	Northern NSW State Cup	2
Football Northern Territory	NT Australia Cup Final	1
Football Queensland	Kappa Queensland Cup	4
Football South Australia	Federation Cup (SA)	2
Football Tasmania	Milan Lakoseljac Cup	1
Football Victoria	Dockerty Cup	4
Football West (WA)	State Cup	2

== Teams ==
A total of 32 teams participated in the competition proper; this included all ten of the Australian-based A-League Men's clubs, plus South Melbourne as the winner of the 2025 Australian Championship. The remaining 21 teams were from member state federations, as determined by the qualifying rounds. A-League Men clubs represent the highest level in the Australian league system, whereas Member Federation clubs come from level 2 and below.

A-League Men clubs
Adelaide United	Brisbane Roar	Central Coast Mariners	Macarthur FC	Melbourne City
Melbourne Victory	Newcastle Jets	Perth Glory	Sydney FC	Western Sydney Wanderers
Member federation clubs
(Australian Capital Territory) Tigers FC (2)	(New South Wales) APIA Leichhardt (2)	(New South Wales) SD Raiders (2)	(New South Wales) Sydney Olympic (2)	(New South Wales) Sydney United 58 (2)
(New South Wales) Maitland FC (2)	(New South Wales) Weston Bears (2)	(Northern Territory) Azzurri United (2)	(Queensland) Peninsula Power (2)	(Queensland) Marlin Coast Rangers (5)
(Queensland) Lions FC (2)	(Queensland) Rochedale Rovers (2)	(South Australia) Cumberland United (3)	(South Australia) FK Beograd (2)	(Tasmania) Kingborough Lions United (2)
(Victoria (state)) Brunswick Juventus (3)	(Victoria (state)) Heidelberg United (2)	(Victoria (state)) North Sunshine Eagles (3)	(Victoria (state)) Preston Lions (2)	(Victoria (state)) South Melbourne (2)
(Western Australia) Bayswater City (2)	(Western Australia) Fremantle City (2)			

== Bracket ==
Round of 32
Marlin Coast Rangers	0
Brunswick Juventus	4
Preston Lions	3
Newcastle Jets	2
South Melbourne	2
Adelaide United	1
Maitland FC	1
Fremantle City	2
Lions FC (p)	1 (4)
Perth Glory	1 (2)
Weston Bears	0
Melbourne City	3
FK Beograd	2
North Sunshine Eagles	3
Cumberland United	0
Heidelberg United	3
Sydney Olympic	0
Brisbane Roar	3
Bayswater City	1
Sydney FC	5
Rochedale Rovers	1
SD Raiders	2
Azzurri United	0
Macarthur FC	3
APIA Leichhardt	2
Peninsula Power	1
Sydney United 58 (p)	1 (11)
Central Coast Mariners	1 (10)
Tigers FC	0
Western Sydney Wanderers	2
Kingborough Lions United	0
Melbourne Victory	4

Round of 16
Brunswick Juventus	1
Preston Lions	4
South Melbourne (p)	3 (3)
Fremantle City	3 (1)
Lions FC	2
Melbourne City	0
North Sunshine Eagles (p)	0 (4)
Heidelberg United	0 (3)
Brisbane Roar	2
Sydney FC	4
SD Raiders (p)	1 (5)
Macarthur FC	1 (3)
APIA Leichhardt (p)	1 (3)
Sydney United 58	1 (2)
Western Sydney Wanderers	1 (2)
Melbourne Victory (p)	1 (3)

Quarter-finals
Preston Lions	1
South Melbourne	2
Lions FC	4
North Sunshine Eagles	0
SD Raiders	0
Sydney FC	1
APIA Leichhardt	0
Melbourne Victory	1

Semi-finals
South Melbourne	3
Lions FC	1
Sydney FC	0
Melbourne Victory	2

Final
South Melbourne (p)	1 (4)
Melbourne Victory	1 (3)

== Round of 32 ==
The draw took place on 22 June 2026 The lowest ranked side that qualified for this round was Marlin Coast Rangers. They were the only level 5 team left in the competition.

Times are AEST (UTC+10) as listed by Football Australia (local times, if different, are in parentheses).

14 July 2026	APIA Leichhardt (2)	2–1	Peninsula Power (2)	Sydney
19:30	Stewart 45'; Symons 67'	Report	Gibbs 69'	Stadium: Leichhardt Oval; Attendance: 648; Referee: Adam Bavcar

14 July 2026	Rochedale Rovers (2)	1–2	SD Raiders (2)	Brisbane
19:30	Talbot 68' (pen.)	Report	Knezevic 36'; Kljajić 48' (o.g.)	Stadium: Underwood Park; Attendance: 1,136; Referee: Mackenzie Janes

15 July 2026	Marlin Coast Rangers (5)	0–4	Brunswick Juventus (3)	Cairns
19:30		Report	Xydias 20'; Sehavdic 42'; Bašić 46', 57'	Stadium: Barlow Park; Attendance: 1,010; Referee: Noah Moss

15 July 2026	FK Beograd (2)	2–3	North Sunshine Eagles (3)	Adelaide
20:00 (19:30 ACST)	Konstandopoulos 58'; Torriani 87'	Report	Barras 51'; Ahmed 60'; Dos Santos 83'	Stadium: 1Solution Park; Attendance: 1,603; Referee: Tom Brinkworth

21 July 2026	Preston Lions (2)	3–2	Newcastle Jets (1)	Melbourne
19:30	Bonada 56', 62'; Lazarevski 90+3'	Report	Dobson 17'; Vergos 23'	Stadium: Genis Steel Stadium; Attendance: 4,334; Referee: Eric Saba

21 July 2026	Lions FC (2)	1–1 (a.e.t.) (4–2 p)	Perth Glory (1)	Brisbane
19:30	Lagos 95'	Report	Lebib 114'	Stadium: Spencer Park; Attendance: 1,000; Referee: Tom Fell
	Penalties
	Carlos (penalty scored); Lagos (penalty scored); Beakhurst (penalty scored); Jarrard (penalty scored)		(penalty scored) Colakovski; (penalty missed) Despotovski; (penalty missed) Sulemani; (penalty scored) S. Sutton

21 July 2026	Cumberland United (3)	0–3	Heidelberg United (2)	Adelaide
20:00 (19:30 ACST)		Report	Theodoropoulos 2'; Duarte 6'; Humbert 50'	Stadium: Lady Burra Stadium; Attendance: 1,022; Referee: Jayden Betterman

21 July 2026	Bayswater City (2)	1–5	Sydney FC (1)	Perth
20:30 (18:30 AWST)	Teece 36'	Report	Quintal 20', 52', 64'; Macallister 38'; De Jesus 62'	Stadium: Frank Drago Reserve; Attendance: 1,052; Referee: Michael Ouliaris

22 July 2026	Sydney United 58 (2)	1–1 (a.e.t.) (11–10 p)	Central Coast Mariners (1)	Sydney
19:30	Krslovic 90' (pen.)	Report	Lavale 59'	Stadium: Sydney United Sports Centre; Attendance: 2,578; Referee: Sophie Allum
	Penalties
	De Oliveira (penalty scored); Cimenti (penalty scored); Krslovic (penalty scored); Tilo (penalty scored); Koko (penalty scored); Glassock (penalty scored); Rose (penalty scored); Vlastelica (penalty scored); Nakano (penalty scored); Ozanic (penalty scored); Pavlesic (penalty scored)		(penalty scored) Becvinovski; (penalty scored) Steele; (penalty scored) Lavale; (penalty scored) Donnell; (penalty scored) Auglah; (penalty scored) Mauragis; (penalty scored) Mantell; (penalty scored) Redmayne; (penalty scored) Roux; (penalty scored) McCann; (penalty missed) McCaskey

22 July 2026	Maitland FC (2)	1–2	Fremantle City (2)	Maitland
19:30	Wara 72'	Report	Domfeh 88'; Ahmedov 90'	Stadium: Maitland Regional Sportsground; Attendance: 987; Referee: Charles Hollings

22 July 2026	Tigers FC (2)	0–2	Western Sydney Wanderers (1)	Canberra
19:30		Report	Di Pizio 67'; Borello 71'	Stadium: McKellar Park; Attendance: 1,948; Referee: Christopher Hodson

22 July 2026	Azzurri United (2)	0–3	Macarthur FC (1)	Darwin
20:00 (19:30 ACST)		Report	Pratezina 5'; Gibson 61'; Pain 80'	Stadium: Darwin Football Stadium; Referee: Jack Powers

26 July 2026	Weston Bears (2)	0–3	Melbourne City (1)	Weston
14:00		Report	Wong 6'; Kutleshi 80'; Memeti 85'	Stadium: Hunter City Motor Group Stadium; Attendance: 1,750; Referee: Joshua Attard

26 July 2026	Kingborough Lions United (2)	0–4	Melbourne Victory (1)	Kingston
17:00		Report	Ziereis 14'; Grimaldi 40'; Santos 62'; Jelacic 90'	Stadium: Kitchen Centre Park; Attendance: 2,875

30 July 2026	South Melbourne (2)	2–1	Adelaide United (1)	Melbourne
19:30	Juach 33'; Uchida 68'	Report	Goodwin 3'	Stadium: Lakeside Stadium; Attendance: 3,080; Referee: Declan Woods

30 July 2026	Sydney Olympic (2)	0–3	Brisbane Roar (1)	Sydney
19:30		Report	Vidic 63'; Ngor 64'; Nasso 77'	Stadium: Belmore Sports Ground; Attendance: 1,115; Referee: Rowan Fisher

== Round of 16 ==
The draw for the remaining rounds took place on 30 July. The lowest ranked sides that qualified for this round were Brunswick Juventus and North Sunshine Eagles. They were the only level 3 teams left in the competition.

Times are AEST (UTC+10) as listed by Football Australia (local times, if different, are in parentheses).

8 August 2026	Western Sydney Wanderers (1)	1–1 (a.e.t.) (2–3 p)	Melbourne Victory (1)	Sydney
19:30	Milanovic 102'	Report	Sawyer 97'	Stadium: Marconi Stadium; Attendance: 2,978; Referee: Adam Bavcar
	Penalties
	Milanovic (penalty scored); Borrello (penalty scored); Scicluna (penalty missed); Lual (penalty missed); Gersbach (penalty missed)		(penalty scored) D'Arrigo; (penalty scored) Sawyer; (penalty scored) Ghossaini; (penalty missed) Nduka

9 August 2026	Brisbane Roar (1)	2–4	Sydney FC (1)	Brisbane
17:00	Lauton 45+1'; A. Popovic 69' (o.g.)	Report	Sekine 2'; Garuccio 24'; Quintal 35'; G. Popovic 90+5'	Stadium: Spencer Park; Attendance: 3,800; Referee: Tom Fell

9 August 2026	South Melbourne (2)	3–3 (a.e.t.) (3–1 p)	Fremantle City (2)	Melbourne
19:40	Cocks 12'; Yoo 20'; Juach 70' (pen.)	Report	Chechlacz 32' (pen.); Edwards 36'; Mokala 51'	Stadium: Lakeside Stadium; Attendance: 2,035; Referee: Jock Quartermain
	Penalties
	Jankovic (penalty scored); Swibel (penalty scored); Cocks (penalty scored)		(penalty scored) Ambrogio; (penalty missed) Chechlacz; (penalty missed) Ahmedov; (penalty missed) Woodcock

11 August 2026	Lions FC (2)	2–0	Melbourne City (1)	Brisbane
19:30	Nieuwenhuizen 20' (o.g.); Hore 62'	Report		Stadium: Spencer Park; Attendance: 1,710; Referee: Mackenzie Janes

11 August 2026	SD Raiders (2)	1–1 (a.e.t.) (5–3 p)	Macarthur FC (1)	Sydney
19:30	Politidis 115' (o.g.)	Report	Helweh 103'	Stadium: Fairfield Showground; Attendance: 1,946; Referee: Noah Moss
	Penalties
	Eremugo (penalty scored); Malfara (penalty scored); Ragg (penalty scored); Lee (penalty scored); Malbasa (penalty scored)		(penalty scored) Reec; (penalty scored) El-Sabeh; (penalty missed) Vickery; (penalty scored) Helweh

12 August 2026	APIA Leichhardt (2)	1–1 (a.e.t.) (3–2 p)	Sydney United 58 (2)	Sydney
19:30	Kambayashi 21'	Report	Nakano 53'	Stadium: Leichhardt Oval; Attendance: 2,302; Referee: Tom Dale
	Penalties
	Deli (penalty scored); Falato (penalty missed); Segreto (penalty scored); Denmead (penalty missed); Caspers (penalty scored)		(penalty missed) Tomelic; (penalty scored) Krslovic; (penalty scored) Jennings; (penalty missed) Rose; (penalty missed) Tilo

12 August 2026	Brunswick Juventus (3)	1–4	Preston Lions (2)	Melbourne
19:30	Sehavdic 26'	Report	Campbell 36' (o.g.); Ali 38'; Brooks 45+2'; Markovski 80'	Stadium: CB Smith Reserve; Attendance: 2,648; Referee: Lucas Mattia

12 August 2026	North Sunshine Eagles (3)	0–0 (a.e.t.) (4–3 p)	Heidelberg United (2)	Melbourne
19:45		Report		Stadium: Nasiol Stadium; Attendance: 1,356; Referee: Michael Ouliaris
	Penalties
	da Silva (penalty missed); Ahmed (penalty scored); Chauve (penalty scored); Olds (penalty scored); Iedom (penalty scored)		(penalty scored) Bramwell; (penalty missed) Humbert; (penalty scored) Lesiotis; (penalty scored) Lee; (penalty missed) McGowan

== Quarter-finals ==
The lowest ranked side that qualified for this round was North Sunshine Eagles. They were the only level 3 team left in the competition. All times are AEST (UTC+10).

18 August 2026	SD Raiders (2)	0–1	Sydney FC (1)	Sydney
19:30		Report	Sekine 33'	Stadium: Fairfield Showground; Attendance: 3,841; Referee: Rowan Fisher

19 August 2026	APIA Leichhardt (2)	0–1 (a.e.t.)	Melbourne Victory (1)	Sydney
19:30		Report	Sawyer 93'	Stadium: Leichhardt Oval; Attendance: 2,117; Referee: Tom Dale

25 August 2026	Lions FC (2)	4–0	North Sunshine Eagles (3)	Brisbane
19:30	Beakhurst 14'; Hore 31', 38'; Deng 42'	Report		Stadium: Luxury Paints Stadium; Attendance: 2,730; Referee: Caitlin Williams

26 August 2026	Preston Lions (2)	1–2	South Melbourne (2)	Melbourne
19:30	Cuba 49'	Report	Painter-Andrews 61'; Cocks 86'	Stadium: Genis Steel Stadium; Attendance: 6,673; Referee: Tom Fell

== Semi-finals ==
The lowest ranked sides that qualified for this round were Lions FC and South Melbourne. They were the only level 2 teams left in the competition. All times are AEST (UTC+10).

9 September 2026	Sydney FC (1)	0–2	Melbourne Victory (1)	Sydney
19:30		Report	Jelacic 2'; Courtney-Perkins 61' (o.g.)	Stadium: Jubilee Stadium; Attendance: 3,187; Referee: Muhammad Taqi (Singapore)

15 September 2026	South Melbourne (2)	3–1	Lions FC (2)	Melbourne
19:30	Juach 53', 60', 83'	Report	Hart-Phillips 23'	Stadium: Lakeside Stadium; Attendance: 5,268; Referee: Rowan Fisher

== Final ==
10 October 2026
19:50 AEDT

South Melbourne (2)	1–1 (a.e.t.)	Melbourne Victory (1)
Mikkola 117'	Report	Genreau 95'
Penalties
Jankovic (penalty scored); Swibel (penalty scored); Lackay (penalty scored); Mesourouni (penalty scored)	4–3	(penalty scored) May; (penalty missed) Sawyer; (penalty scored) Ghossaini; (penalty scored) Genreau; (penalty missed) Davidson

AAMI Park, Melbourne
Attendance: 29,911
Referee: Alireza Faghani

== Individual honours ==
The recipient of the Michael Cockerill Medal to recognise the tournament's standout National Premier Leagues performer was Marco Janković from South Melbourne.

Javier Díaz López from South Melbourne won the Mark Viduka Medal for the player of the match in the final.

== Top goalscorers ==
Rank	Player	Club	Goals
1	(Australia) Bul Juach	South Melbourne	5
2	(Australia) Tiago Quintal	Sydney FC	4
3	(Australia) Mitchell Hore	Lions FC	3
4	(Australia) Marko Basic	Brunswick Juventus	2
4	(Argentina) Nahuel Bonada	Preston Lions	2
4	(South Africa) Arran Cocks	South Melbourne	2
4	(Australia) Keegan Jelacic	Melbourne Victory	2
4	(Australia) Harry Sawyer	Melbourne Victory	2
4	(Japan) Takahiro Sekine	Sydney FC	2

Note: Goals scored in preliminary rounds not included.
