= Jaylen Rodwell =

New Zealand footballer (born 2002)

Personal information
- Date of birth: 31 May 2002 (age 24)
- Place of birth: Auckland, New Zealand
- Height: 1.83 m (6 ft 0 in)
- Positions: Defender; midfielder

Team information
- Current team: South Island United
- Number: 6

Youth career
- –2018: Wellington Phoenix
- 2018–2019: Team Wellington
- 2019–2020: Eastern Suburbs

College career
Years	Team	Apps	(Gls)
2021–2022	Portland Pilots	19	(0)

Senior career*
Years	Team	Apps	(Gls)
2020–2021	Wellington Phoenix Reserves	14	(1)
2021	Western Suburbs	5	(0)
2021	Fencibles United		
2022–2023	Fencibles United		
2023–2024	Birkenhead United	41	(1)
2025	Edgeworth		
2025	Auckland United	10	(0)
2026–	South Island United	17	(1)
2026	Wellington Olympic	0	(0)
- * Club domestic league appearances and goals as of 21 May 2026

Jaylen Rodwell (born 31 May 2002) is a New Zealand footballer who plays as a defender or midfielder for South Island United in the OFC Pro League.

== Early life ==
Rodwell was born on 31 May 2002. Born in Auckland, New Zealand, he is a native of the city. Growing up, he attended the University of Portland in the United States.

== Career ==
Rodwell started his career with New Zealand side Wellington Phoenix Reserves during the summer of 2020, where he made 14 league appearances and scored zero goals. Following his stint there, he signed for Australian side Edgeworth in 2025.

The same year, he signed for New Zealand side Auckland United, where he made 15 league appearances and scored zero goals. Ahead of the 2026 season, he signed for New Zealand side South Island United, becoming the first player with Niue nationality to sign for a professional side. His professional debut was shared with fellow Niuean Aiden Carey, whom opposed him playing for Auckland FC on 17 January 2026.
