= Jordan Swibel =

Australian footballer (born 1999)

Personal information
- Full name: Jordan Swibel
- Date of birth: 13 April 1999 (age 27)
- Place of birth: Camperdown, Australia
- Height: 1.80 m (5 ft 11 in)
- Position: Forward

Team information
- Current team: South Melbourne
- Number: 15

Youth career
- 2012–2013: Sydney University FC
- 2014–2017: Hakoah Sydney City East
- 2018–2021: Sydney FC

Senior career*
| Years | Team | Apps | (Gls) |
| 2016–2017 | Hakoah Sydney City East | 1 | (0) |
| 2018–2021 | Sydney FC NPL | 40 | (16) |
| 2020–2021 | Sydney FC | 11 | (0) |
| 2021–2022 | Western Sydney Wanderers | 2 | (0) |
| 2022 | Western Sydney Wanderers NPL | 8 | (9) |
| 2022 | Hapoel Nof HaGalil | 5 | (1) |
| 2023 | Marconi Stallions | 28 | (15) |
| 2024 | Valour FC | 28 | (7) |
| 2025–2026 | Marconi Stallions | 16 | (2) |
| 2026– | South Melbourne | 44 | (20) |
- * Club domestic league appearances and goals as of 21 November 2026 ‡ National team caps and goals as of 11 November 2019

Jordan "Jordi" Swibel (born 13 April 1999) is an Australian professional soccer player who plays as a forward for NPL Victoria club South Melbourne.

== Early life ==
Swibel was born on 13 April 1999. Born in Camperdown, Australia, he is a native of the city. He is the son of Michael. He has an older sister. He started playing his youth club football in 2012–2013, with Sydney University FC winning the NPL Championship the same year. In 2014 he joined Hakoah Sydney City East, where he came through the youth ranks and became the top goalscorer of the under-18 squad during the 2016 season, helping his side win the league premiership and Grand Final championship double. During the same season, he made his first-team debut for Hakoah in the FFA Cup.

In the summer of 2017, Swibel went on trial for Maccabi Tel Aviv after being scouted in a youth tournament in Israel.

In 2018, Swibel joined the youth academy of Sydney FC. He was part of the Sydney team that won the 2019–20 Y-League, having scored the opening goal in a 5–1 win over Melbourne Victory in the Grand Final.

== Club career ==
=== Sydney FC ===
In March 2019 Swibel was included in Sydney FC's first-team squad for the group stage of the AFC Champions League. On 4 January 2020, Swibel made his professional debut for Sydney, coming on for Kosta Barbarouses in the 87th minute of a 2–1 league win over Adelaide United. On 25 November 2020, he made his AFC Champions League debut, coming on for Paulo Retre in the 83rd minute of a 1–0 loss to Jeonbuk Hyundai Motors in the group stage. In January 2021 Swibel signed a one-year scholarship deal with Sydney FC, but was eventually released by the club in July of the same year. He made a total amount of 13 appearances in all competitions for the team.

=== Western Sydney Wanderers ===
On 28 October 2021 Swibel signed a one-year scholarship deal with fellow A-League Men club Western Sydney Wanderers, following a successful trial. While having limited playing time within the first team, he mainly featured for their NPL team; having scored nine goals in eight league matches, he helped the club gain promotion to NPL 1. He left the club in July 2022, following the expiration of his deal.

=== Hapoel Nof HaGalil ===
After going on trial for Israeli Premier League club Ashdod, whom he was recommended to by former WSW team-mate Tomer Hemed. On 1 August 2022 Swibel signed a one-year contract with Liga Leumit side Hapoel Nof HaGalil. Thanks to his Jewish heritage, he did not count towards the foreign player quotas required in Israeli leagues. On 22 September, he scored his first goal for the club, netting the winner in a 2–1 league victory over Hapoel Rishon LeZion.

=== Marconi Stallions ===
On 12 December 2022 Swibel returned to Australia, joining National Premier Leagues NSW side Marconi Stallions. He was the club's top scorer for the 2023 league campaign, having scored 15 goals in 28 matches.

=== Valour FC ===
On 12 January 2024 Swibel signed a professional contract with Canadian Premier League club Valour FC. He scored his first goal in his debut for the club on 14 April against Vancouver FC. Swibel scored his second goal for the club and the winner in a 2–1 victory against Halifax FC at Wanderers Stadium Nova Scotia on 20 May 2024. Swibel finished the season as the clubs joint top scorer on seven goals. He featured in all 28 CPL matches and 1 Canadian Championship match playing a total of 2105 minutes with 25 starts (24 in CPL and 1 in the Canadian Championship).

=== Marconi Stallions ===
In July 2025 Swibel signed with his former club rejoining National Premier Leagues NSW side Marconi Stallions. On 28 September 2025 Marconi Stallions announced that Swibel had re-signed with the club for the inaugural Australian Championship competition.

=== South Melbourne FC ===
On 9 January 2026 South Melbourne announced they had signed Jordan Swibel. He made his club debut in their opening 2–1 OFC Professional League win against Tahiti United. In the match against PNG Hekari Swibel scored a brace in a comfortable 5–0 victory. Swibel made his club NPL debut on 14 February in a 2–0 win against Avondale FC at Avenger Park. He scored his first NPL Victoria goal on 7 March in a 1–0 win against Bentleigh Greens at Home of the Matildas Centre. South Melbourne reached the final of the OFC Pro League and narrowly went down 2–1 to Auckland FC on Sunday 24 May 2026 to finish as runners up. Swibel was also the runner up in the Golden Boot race with 10 goals (one shy of the winner on 11 goals) and collected three Man of the Match awards throughout the competition. Swibel was also selected in the OFC Pro League 2026 Team of the Season. After a fourth-place finish on the NPL ladder, Swibel was the clubs Golden Boot for the 2026 season with five goals as South Melbourne were defeated in the preliminary final 2–1 by Oakleigh Cannons to end their campaign. Swibel won the Australia Cup 2026 with South Melbourne in a historic achievement by the club against A-League side Melbourne Victory in front of a sold-out crowd of 29,911 at AAMI Park. South Melbourne became the first NPL side to lift the trophy in the Australia Cup competition. Swibel played an integral part in the result by helping set up the late equaliser to make it 1–1 in extra time. He then slotted home his penalty in the ensuing shootout with South Melbourne winning 4–3.

== Personal life ==
A self-declared fan of Manchester United, Swibel has cited Wayne Rooney as his footballing idol. He obtained Israeli citizenship.

== Honours ==
Sydney University FC

- NPL Youth Championship: 2012

Hakoah Sydney City East FC

- NPL Youth Premiership & NPL Youth Championship: 2016

Sydney FC Youth

- Y-League: 2019–20

Sydney FC

- A-League regular season: 2019–20
- A-League Grand Final: 2020

South Melbourne FC

- Australia Cup: 2026

Individual

- 2016 Club Golden Boot Hakoah Sydney City East FC – 14 goals
- 2023 Club Golden Boot Marconi Stallions – 15 goals
- 2024 Club Golden Boot Valour FC – 7 goals
- 2026 Club Golden Boot South Melbourne – 5 goals
- OFC Professional League Team of the Season: 2026
