= South Island United FC =

Men's professional football club in New Zealand

South Island United
- Full name: South Island United Football Club
- Nickname: The Southerners
- Short name: SIU
- Founded: 7 October 2025; 13 months ago
- Ground: United Sports Centre and Te Kaha
- Capacity: 1,000
- Coordinates: 43.5148°S 172.5286°E
- Owner: Christchurch United
- General Manager: Ryan Edwards
- Head coach: Scott Hales
- League: OFC Professional League
- 2026: OFC Pro League: 3rd
- Website: southislandunited.com
Home colours	Away colours

South Island United Football Club is a men's professional association football club based in Christchurch, New Zealand. Established in 2025, the club is owned and operated by Christchurch United and first competed in the OFC Professional League (OFCPL) 2026 season. It is the third professional football club in New Zealand after Wellington Phoenix and Auckland FC, and the first in the South Island.

== History ==
South Island United was formed in 2025 as the professional branch of Christchurch United, one of New Zealand’s most successful football clubs. The creation of the new club followed Christchurch United's successful bid for entry into the newly established OFC Professional League, announced by the Oceania Football Confederation in August 2025.

The professional franchise was launched to represent the entire South Island region rather than a single city or club, aiming to unify the island's football community and provide a development pathway for young players. Club officials described South Island United as a "team for all South Island footballers", highlighting collaboration with clubs across the Southern League and Mainland Football region.

The club unveiled its name and branding in October 2025, confirming that South Island United would operate under the ownership of Christchurch United but maintain a distinct identity, kit, and management structure.

== Sponsorship ==
On 14 December 2025, South Island United announced that Go Media would be the club's first official front shirt sponsor for the 2026 season. The next day on 15 December 2025, the club announced their first ever kit producers New Balance.

Period	Kit manufacturer	Shirt sponsor
2026–	New Balance	Go Media

== Stadium ==
South Island United uses the United Sports Centre in Christchurch as its training and administrative base. The venue is owned by Christchurch United and serves as one of New Zealand’s premier football facilities. The club plans to play in the Te Kaha stadium, once completed.

== Organisation ==
The club operates as the professional extension of Christchurch United, with the parent club retaining control of its academy and community programmes. South Island United will recruit players primarily from South Island clubs, while also signing overseas and Oceania-based players in accordance with OFCPL roster regulations.

== League ==
South Island United participate as one of eight founding clubs in the OFC Professional League, which began on 17 January 2026. The league will determine the Oceania representative for the FIFA Intercontinental Cup and the FIFA Club World Cup.

== Coaching staff ==
=== Technical officials ===
Position	Name	Ref.
Head coach	(England) Scott Hales	
Assistant coach	(Spain) Adrià Casals	
Goalkeeping coach	(New Zealand) Callum Kennett	
Team manager	(Netherlands) Coen Lanmers	
Physiotherapist	(New Zealand) Michael Peterson	

=== Management ===
Position	Name	Ref.
General manager	(New Zealand) Ryan Edwards	

=== Captaincy history ===
Dates	Name	Honours (as captain)
2026–	(New Zealand) Christian Gray	Inaugural club captain

=== Managers ===
As of end of 2026 season.

List of South Island United Managers
Name	Nationality	From	To	M	W	D	L	GF	GA	Win %	Ref.
Rob Sherman	Wales	2 October 2025	8 August 2026	18	6	5	7	29	36	33.33	
Scott Hales	England	10 October 2026	Current	0	0	0	0	0	0	—	

== Players ==
=== First-team squad ===
As of 19 November 2026

Note: Flags indicate national team as defined under FIFA eligibility rules; some limited exceptions apply. Players may hold more than one non-FIFA nationality.

No.	Pos.	Nation	Player
2	DF	NZL	Lewis Partridge
3	MF	NZL	Ollie van Rijssel (vice-captain)
4	DF	NZL	Christian Gray (captain)
5	DF	NZL	Josh Rogerson
6	DF	NZL	Jaylen Rodwell
8	MF	NZL	Jackson Manuel
9	FW	NZL	Ryan Feutz
10	DF	NZL	Ry McLeod
11	FW	NZL	Oskar van Hattum
12	DF	NZL	Riley Grover
14	MF	SAM	Dauntae Mariner
17	MF	AUS	Deen Hasanovic
18	MF	NZL	Charlie Beale

No.	Pos.	Nation	Player
19	FW	PAK	Haris Zeb
20	FW	NZL	Oliver Fay
21	GK	NZL	Callum Kennett
22	MF	SOL	Rovu Boyers
23	GK	NZL	Shea Stapleton
—	GK	COK	Ngereine Maro
—	DF	PNG	Alwin Komolong
—	DF	AUS	Lewis Miccio
—	DF	SAM	Alonzo Taulapapa
—	MF	AUS	Jesse Daley
—	MF	NZL	Tor Davenport Petersen
—	MF	NZL	Wan Gatkek
—	FW	AUS	Joel Russell
—		SAM	Roman Telling

== OFC Professional League results ==
Season	OFC Professional League								Position	Playoff	Finals	Top goalscorer(s)	
Season	Pld	W	L	D	GF	GA	GD	Pts	Position	Playoff	Finals	Name(s)	Goals
2026	14	5	5	4	24	26	−2	20	4th	3th	Semifinals	(New Zealand) Ryan Feutz	9

== See also ==
- Christchurch United
- OFC Professional League
- Football in New Zealand
- Southern League (New Zealand)
