= 2023–24 Brisbane Roar FC season =

Brisbane Roar
2023–24 season
- Chairman: Kaz Patafta
- Manager: Ross Aloisi (until 24 December 2023); Luciano Trani (caretaker) (from 24 December 2023 until 1 January 2024); Ben Cahn (from 1 January 2024 until 1 February 2024); Ruben Zadkovich (from 1 February 2024)
- Stadium: Suncorp Stadium
- A-League Men: 9th
- A-League Men Finals: DNQ
- Australia Cup: Runners-up
- Top goalscorer: League: Henry Hore; Jay O'Shea; Thomas Waddingham (7 each); All: Thomas Waddingham (11)
- Highest home attendance: 10,115 vs. Sydney FC (6 January 2024); A-League Men
- Lowest home attendance: 3,178 vs. Macarthur FC (16 March 2024); A-League Men
- Average home league attendance: 6,707
- Biggest win: 5–0 vs. Sydney United 58 (A) (26 August 2023); Australia Cup
- Biggest defeat: 1–8 vs. Melbourne City (A) (28 December 2023); A-League Men
Home colours	Away colours	Third colours
- All statistics correct as of 27 April 2024.

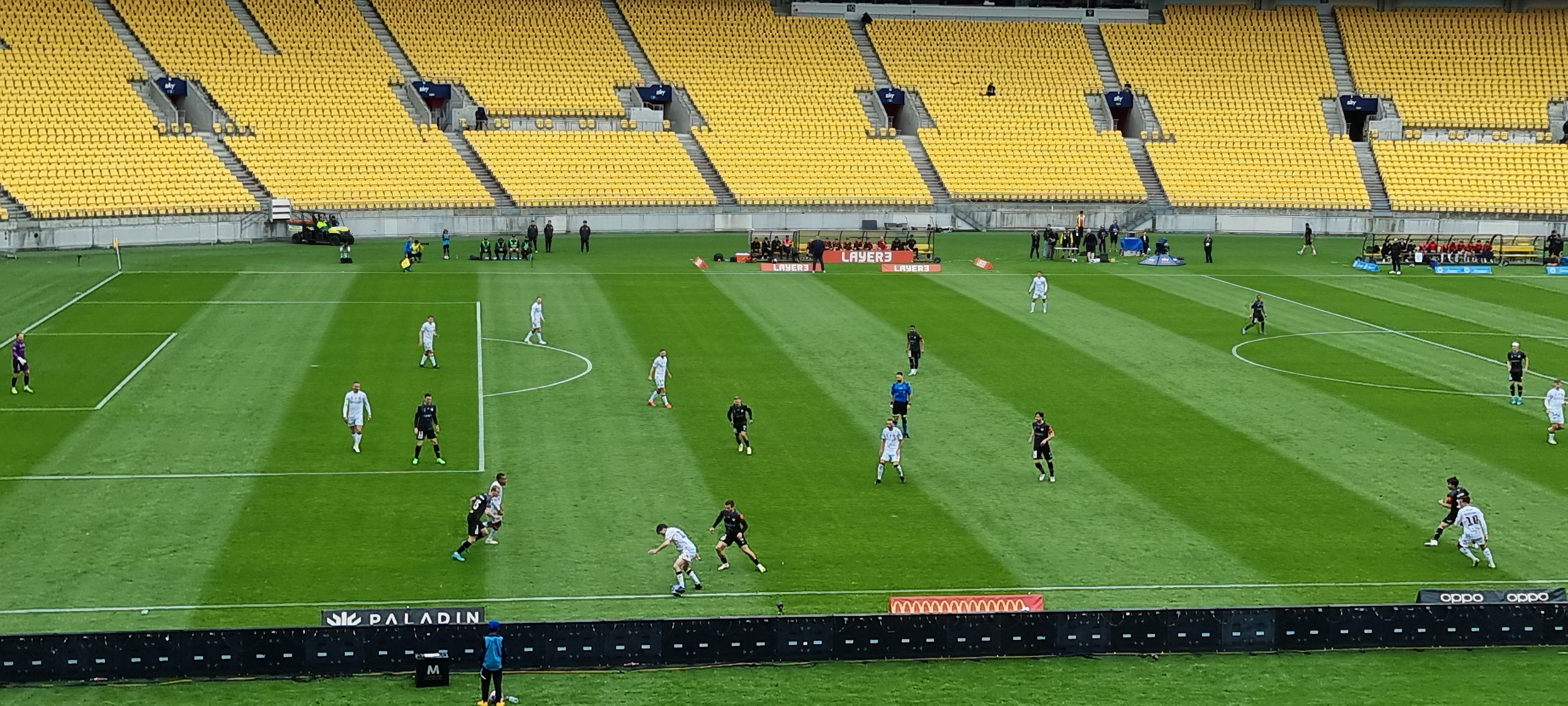
Brisbane Roar playing against the Wellington Phoenix at Sky Stadium, Wellington on 31 March 2024.

The 2023–24 season was the club's 29th national season in the history of Brisbane Roar Football Club. The club participated in the A-League Men for the 18th time, and participated in the Australia Cup for the eighth time.

On 2 May 2023, Ross Aloisi was appointed as the club's new head coach. On 24 December 2023, Aloisi left the club to take up a job as an assistant coach to Kevin Muscat at Shanghai Port and the club promoted assistant Luciano Trani to the head coach role in an interim position until the end of the season. After one match in charge, in which they lost 1–8 to Melbourne City, the club appointed Ben Cahn as head coach to replace Trani who returned to his assistant coach role. A month later, Cahn took an indefinate medical leave and his assistant coach, Ruben Zadkovich, was promoted as head coach in an interim role. A few months later, Zadkovich was appointed as the permanent head coach.

== Players ==
Note: Flags indicate national team as defined under FIFA eligibility rules; some limited exceptions apply. Players may hold more than one non-FIFA nationality.

No.	Pos.	Nation	Player
1	GK	AUS	Macklin Freke
2	DF	AUS	Scott Neville
3	DF	AUS	Corey Brown
5	DF	SCO	Tom Aldred (captain)
6	MF	AUS	Joe Caletti
7	MF	FRA	Florin Berenguer
8	FW	AUS	Jonas Markovski
10	FW	AUS	Nikola Mileusnic
11	MF	AUS	Jez Lofthouse
12	MF	AUS	Taras Gomulka
13	FW	AUS	Henry Hore
14	FW	AUS	Rylan Brownlie (scholarship)
16	FW	AUS	Thomas Waddingham (scholarship)
17	FW	AUS	Carlo Armiento

No.	Pos.	Nation	Player
18	MF	AUS	Shae Cahill
19	DF	SRI	Jack Hingert
20	FW	NZL	Marco Rojas
21	DF	AUS	Antonee Burke-Gilroy
22	FW	AUS	Alex Parsons
23	MF	AUS	Keegan Jelacic (on loan from Gent)
26	MF	IRL	Jay O'Shea
27	DF	AUS	Kai Trewin
29	GK	AUS	Matt Acton
30	MF	AUS	Quinn MacNicol (scholarship)
32	DF	AUS	James Nikolovski (scholarship)
35	MF	AUS	Louis Zabala
44	DF	AUS	Ryan Lethlean
99	FW	SSD	Ayom Majok (scholarship)

== Transfers ==
=== Transfers in ===
No.	Position	Player	Transferred from	Type/fee	Contract length	Date	Ref
22	FW	Alex Parsons	Sydney FC	Free transfer		3 July 2023	
29	GK	Matt Acton	Unattached	Free transfer	1 year	3 July 2023	
3	DF	Corey Brown	Unattached	Free transfer		3 July 2023	
6	MF	Joe Caletti	(Japan) Tochigi City	Free transfer	1 year	3 August 2023	
7	MF	(France) Florin Berenguer	Unattached	Free transfer	2 years	11 August 2023	
18	MF	Shae Cahill	Unattached	Free transfer	Multi-year	19 September 2023	
8	FW	Jonas Markovski	(Australia) Altona Magic	Free transfer		20 September 2023	
23	DF	Aaron Reardon	(Australia) Gold Coast Knights	Free transfer	1 year	20 September 2023	
21	DF	Antonee Burke-Gilroy	Unattached	Free transfer	1 year	9 November 2023	
44	DF	Ryan Lethlean	Melbourne Victory NPL	Free transfer	1.5 years	11 January 2024	
23	MF	Keegan Jelacic	(Belgium) Gent	Loan	5 months	12 January 2024	
20	MF	(New Zealand) Marco Rojas	Unattached	Free transfer	5 months	30 January 2024	

==== From youth squad ====
N	Pos.	Nat.	Name	Age	Notes
16	FW	(Australia)	Thomas Waddingham	18	scholarship contract
30	MF	(Australia)	Quinn MacNicol	15	scholarship contract
14	FW	(Australia)	Rylan Brownlie	16	scholarship contract

=== Transfers out ===
No.	Position	Player	Transferred to	Type/fee	Date	Ref.
3	DF	Jordan Courtney-Perkins	(Poland) Raków Częstochowa	End of loan	11 May 2023	
14	FW	Robbie Kruse	Unattached	End of contract	11 May 2023	
16	DF	Josh Brindell-South	Unattached	End of contract	11 May 2023	
21	MF	(Austria) Marcel Canadi	Unattached	End of contract	11 May 2023	
28	FW	Joe Knowles	Unattached	End of contract	11 May 2023	
23	GK	Jordan Holmes	Unattached	End of contract	7 June 2023	
22	FW	(Serbia) Stefan Šćepović	Unattached	End of contract	26 June 2023	
7	MF	(Afghanistan) Rahmat Akbari	(Georgia (country)) Torpedo Kutaisi	Mutual contract termination	28 June 2023	
15	DF	Noah Smith	Central Coast Mariners	Mutual contract termination	2 August 2023	
23	DF	Aaron Reardon	Unattached	Mutual contract termination	10 January 2024	

=== Contract extensions ===
No.	Name	Position	Duration	Date	Notes
11	Jez Lofthouse	Winger	1 year	24 May 2023	
35	Louis Zabala	Central midfielder	1 year	24 May 2023	
10	Nikola Mileusnic	Winger	1 year	14 July 2023	
2	Scott Neville	Central defender	1 year	25 August 2023	Contract extended from end of 2023–24 to end of 2024–25
26	(Republic of Ireland) Jay O'Shea	Attacking midfielder	2 years	26 December 2023	Contract extended from end of 2023–24 to end of 2025–26

== Pre-season and friendlies ==
Win Draw Loss Fixtures

17 July 2023	Brisbane Roar (Australia)	2–0	(Australia) Brisbane Strikers	Rochedale
19:00 AEST	Hore 2'; Nash 8'	Report		Stadium: Underwood Park

23 July 2023 Fraser Coast Tour	Football Wide Bay Select XI (Australia)	0–10	(Australia) Brisbane Roar	Nikenbah
13:00 AEST		Report	Waddingham ?', ?', ?', ?'; O'Shea ?' (pen.); Mileusnic ?'; Kur ?', ?'; Majok ?'; MacNicol ?'	Stadium: Fraser Coast Sports and Recreation Precinct; Attendance: 2,000

26 July 2023	Peninsula Power (Australia)	0–2	(Australia) Brisbane Roar	Kippa-Ring
19:30 AEST		Report	Hore 26'; Trewin 47'	Stadium: A.J. Kelly Park

6 August 2023	Rochedale Rovers (Australia)	1–7	(Australia) Brisbane Roar	Rochedale
15:00 AEST	Dearn 17'	Report	Trewin 36'; O'Shea ?' (pen.), 83' (pen.); Hore 58'; Parsons 71'; Waddingham 73'; Majok 74'	Stadium: Underwood Park

2 September 2023	Brisbane Roar (Australia)	3–1	(Australia) Western United	Logan
12:30 AEST	O'Shea 21' (pen.); Hore 50'; Armiento 77' (pen.)	Report	Bisetto 44'	Stadium: Meakin Park

20 September 2023	Newcastle Jets (Australia)	4–0	(Australia) Brisbane Roar	Coffs Harbour
19:00	Bayliss; Buhagiar; Mauragis	Report		Stadium: C.ex Coffs International Stadium; Attendance: 4,100

== Competitions ==
=== Overall record ===
Competition	First match	Last match	Starting round	Final position	Record							
Competition	First match	Last match	Starting round	Final position	Pld	W	D	L	GF	GA	GD	Win %
A-League Men	21 October 2023	26 April 2024	Matchday 1	9th	27	8	6	13	42	55	−13	29.63
Australia Cup	14 August 2023	7 October 2023	Round of 32	Runners-up	5	4	0	1	14	7	+7	80.00
Total					32	12	6	14	56	62	−6	37.50

Last updated: 26 April 2024
Source: Soccerway

=== A-League Men ===
==== League table ====
Pos	Team	Pld	W	D	L	GF	GA	GD	Pts	Qualification
7	Western Sydney Wanderers	27	11	4	12	44	48	−4	37	
8	Adelaide United	27	9	5	13	52	53	−1	32	
9	Brisbane Roar	27	8	6	13	42	55	−13	30	Qualification for 2024 Australia Cup play-offs
10	Newcastle Jets	27	6	10	11	39	47	−8	28	Qualification for 2024 Australia Cup play-offs
11	Western United	27	7	5	15	36	55	−19	26	Qualification for 2024 Australia Cup play-offs

Source: A-Leagues
Rules for classification: 1) points; 2) wins; 3) goal difference; 4) goals scored; 5) head-to-head results; 5a) head-to-head points; 5b) head-to-head goal difference; 6) Fair Play points; 7) away goal difference; 8) away goals per match; 9) home goal difference; 10) home goals per match; 11) toss of a coin in an event of a tie of two clubs.

==== Results summary ====
Home figures include Brisbane Roar's 3–2 win on neutral ground against Newcastle Jets on 14 January 2024.

Overall								Home						Away					
Pld	W	D	L	GF	GA	GD	Pts	W	D	L	GF	GA	GD	W	D	L	GF	GA	GD
27	8	6	13	42	55	−13	30	5	3	6	27	27	0	3	3	7	15	28	−13

Last updated: 26 April 2024.
Source: Ultimate A-League

==== Results by round ====
Round	1	2	3	4	5	6	7	8	9	10	11	27	13	12	14	15	16	17	18	19	20	21	22	23	24	25	26
Ground	A	H	A	A	H	H	A	A	H	A	H	N	A	H	A	H	H	A	H	H	A	H	A	A	H	A	H
Result	D	W	L	W	W	D	W	L	L	L	L	W	L	L	L	D	W	L	D	W	D	L	L	W	L	D	L
Position	6	4	7	6	4	4	2	5	5	7	9	8	9	9	9	9	8	8	8	7	8	8	8	8	8	8	9
Points	1	4	4	7	10	11	14	14	14	14	14	17	17	17	17	18	21	21	22	25	26	26	26	29	29	30	30

Updated to match(es) played on 26 April 2024. Source: Ultimate A-League
A = Away; H = Home; N = Neutral; W = Win; D = Draw; L = Loss

==== Matches ====
Win Draw Loss Fixtures

21 October 2023 1	Macarthur FC	1–1	Brisbane Roar	Sydney
15:30 AEDT	Rodrigues 52'	Report	O'Shea 73'	Stadium: Campbelltown Sports Stadium; Attendance: 3,002; Referee: Jonathan Barreiro

27 October 2023 2	Brisbane Roar	3–0	Sydney FC	Brisbane
18:45 AEST	Hore 1', 51'; Mileusnic 21'	Report		Stadium: Suncorp Stadium; Attendance: 7,688; Referee: Alireza Faghani

4 November 2023 3	Wellington Phoenix	5–2	Brisbane Roar	Wellington
17:30 NZDT	Payne 24'; Zawada 32', 63', 90+2'; Kraev 58'	Report	Berenguer 1'; Mileusnic 53'	Stadium: Sky Stadium; Attendance: 7,077; Referee: Jack Morgan

12 November 2023 4	Central Coast Mariners	1–2	Brisbane Roar	Gosford
17:00 AEDT	Kuol 31'	Report	Berenguer 19'; Waddingham 41'	Stadium: Industree Group Stadium; Attendance: 7,077; Referee: Jonathan Barreiro

26 November 2023 5	Brisbane Roar	2–1	Perth Glory	Brisbane
14:00 AEST	Hore 56'; O'Shea 65'	Report	Šušnjar 90+4'	Stadium: Suncorp Stadium; Attendance: 9,769; Referee: Ben Abraham

1 December 2023 6	Brisbane Roar	2–2	Western Sydney Wanderers	Brisbane
19:35 AEST	Mileusnic 13'; Hingert 15'	Report	Milanovic 46'; Antonsson 88'	Stadium: Suncorp Stadium; Attendance: 5,977; Referee: Daniel Elder
Note: Match originally scheduled for 18:45 AEST, but delayed due to thunderstorms. It was rescheduled for 19:05 AEST, then 19:35 AEST.

10 December 2023 7	Adelaide United	0–2	Brisbane Roar	Adelaide
14:30 ACDT		Report	Lofthouse 47'; O'Shea 54' (pen.)	Stadium: Coopers Stadium; Attendance: 7,233; Referee: Alex King

15 December 2023 8	Western United	2–1	Brisbane Roar	Melbourne
18:00 AEDT	Penha 83' (pen.); Risdon 90+1'	Report	O'Shea 69' (pen.)	Stadium: AAMI Park; Attendance: 2,842; Referee: Jack Morgan
Note: Match originally scheduled for 16 December at 19:30 AEDT. It was rescheduled for 15 December at 18:00 AEDT.

21 December 2023 9	Brisbane Roar	0–3	Central Coast Mariners	Brisbane
19:00 AEST		Report	Túlio 27'; Torres 56', 90+7'	Stadium: Suncorp Stadium; Attendance: 6,855; Referee: Shaun Evans
Note: Match originally scheduled for 18:45 AEST, but delayed due to thunderstorms. It was rescheduled for 19:00 AEST.

28 December 2023 10	Melbourne City	8–1	Brisbane Roar	Melbourne
19:45 AEDT	Good 10'; Maclaren 14', 34', 58'; Natel 48', 70'; Arslan 76'; Mazzeo 85'	Report	Brownlie 62'	Stadium: AAMI Park; Attendance: 6,322; Referee: Alex King

6 January 2024 11	Brisbane Roar	1–2	Sydney FC	Brisbane
18:45 AEST	Mileusnic 45+4'	Report	Gomes 1', 42'	Stadium: Suncorp Stadium; Attendance: 10,115; Referee: Daniel Elder

14 January 2024 27	Brisbane Roar	3–2	Newcastle Jets	Sydney
19:45 AEDT	O'Shea 61', 90' (pen.); Markovski 82'	Report	Stamatelopoulos 18'; Cancar 65'	Stadium: Allianz Stadium; Attendance: 3,948; Referee: Jack Morgan

18 January 2024 13	Brisbane Roar	1–3	Macarthur FC	Brisbane
18:45 AEST	Markovski 62'	Report	Dávila 16'; Rodrigues 53'; Drew 59'	Stadium: Suncorp Stadium; Attendance: 5,278; Referee: Alex King

23 January 2024 12	Newcastle Jets	3–1	Brisbane Roar	Newcastle
17:00 AEDT	Stamatelopoulos 29', 54'; Mauragis 57'	Report	Majok 71'	Stadium: McDonald Jones Stadium; Attendance: 5,245; Referee: Daniel Cook

27 January 2024 14	Central Coast Mariners	2–0	Brisbane Roar	Gosford
19:45 AEDT	Di Pizio 38'; Torres 90'	Report		Stadium: Industree Group Stadium; Attendance: 6,080; Referee: Tim Danaskos

2 February 2024 15	Brisbane Roar	1–1	Wellington Phoenix	Brisbane
18:45 AEST	Brown 90+4'	Report	Kraev 51'	Stadium: Suncorp Stadium; Attendance: 5,327; Referee: Ben Abraham

10 February 2024 16	Brisbane Roar	5–1	Melbourne City	Brisbane
17:00 AEST	Trewin 2'; Waddingham 30', 46'; O'Shea 33'; Jelacic 39'	Report	Antonis 73'	Stadium: Suncorp Stadium; Attendance: 7,288; Referee: Alex King

17 February 2024 17	Perth Glory	3–2	Brisbane Roar	Perth
18:45 AWST	Taggart 24', 73'; Colakovski 78'	Report	Mileusnic 29'; Waddingham 36'	Stadium: HBF Park; Attendance: 6,597; Referee: Adam Kersey

23 February 2024 18	Brisbane Roar	2–2	Western United	Brisbane
18:45 AEST	Waddingham 58'; Markovski 90+1'	Report	Rukavytsya 6'; Botic 79'	Stadium: Suncorp Stadium; Attendance: 4,992; Referee: Casey Reibelt

3 March 2024 19	Brisbane Roar	3–2	Melbourne Victory	Brisbane
16:00 AEST	Rojas 23', 56'; Waddingham 70'	Report	Machach 35'; Bonevacia 86'	Stadium: Suncorp Stadium; Attendance: 6,184; Referee: Daniel Elder

10 March 2024 20	Sydney FC	1–1	Brisbane Roar	Sydney
17:00 AEDT	Mak 64'	Report	Hore 67'	Stadium: Allianz Stadium; Attendance: 11,087; Referee: Adam Kersey

16 March 2024 21	Brisbane Roar	1–2	Macarthur FC	Brisbane
15:00 AEST	Berenguer 14'	Report	Uskok 26'; Rodrigues 42'	Stadium: Ballymore Stadium; Attendance: 3,178; Referee: Alex King

31 March 2024 22	Wellington Phoenix	1–0	Brisbane Roar	Wellington
10:00 NZDT	Kraev 2'	Report		Stadium: Sky Stadium; Attendance: 8,225; Referee: Tim Danaskos
Note: Originally scheduled for 29 March, the match was postponed by two days.

5 April 2024 23	Western Sydney Wanderers	1–2	Brisbane Roar	Sydney
19:45 AEST	Pierias 64'	Report	Aldred 32'; Hore 77'	Stadium: CommBank Stadium; Attendance: 5,127; Referee: Daniel Elder

13 April 2024 24	Brisbane Roar	0–2	Newcastle Jets	Brisbane
17:30 AEST		Report	Taylor 53'; Stamatelopoulos 63'	Stadium: Suncorp Stadium; Attendance: 7,486; Referee: Adam Kersey

20 April 2024 25	Melbourne Victory	0–0	Brisbane Roar	Melbourne
17:30 AEST		Report		Stadium: AAMI Park; Attendance: 8,202; Referee: Jack Morgan

26 April 2024 26	Brisbane Roar	3–4	Adelaide United	Brisbane
19:45 AEST	Hore 3', 83'; Waddingham 78'	Report	Ibusuki 39', 47'; Mauk 64'; Van der Saag 74'	Stadium: Suncorp Stadium; Attendance: 7,051; Referee: Lachlan Keevers

=== Australia Cup ===
Win Draw Loss

14 August 2023 Round of 32	Newcastle Jets	2–3 (a.e.t.)	Brisbane Roar	Maitland
19:30 AEST	Buhagiar 12'; Taylor 58'	Report	Scott 45+3' (o.g.); Zabala 62'; Parsons 118'	Stadium: Maitland Sportsground; Attendance: 2,763; Referee: Ben Abraham

26 August 2023 Round of 16	Sydney United 58 (New South Wales)	0–5	Brisbane Roar	Sydney
14:00 AEST		Report	Hore 19'; Waddingham 40'; Mileusnic 56'; O'Shea 67' (pen.); Macnicol 81'	Stadium: Sydney United Sports Centre; Attendance: 1,050; Referee: Alireza Faghani

16 September 2023 Quarter-finals	Brisbane Roar	4–2	Western Sydney Wanderers	Brisbane
17:30 AEST	Armiento 29'; Waddingham 40'; Caletti 64'; Hore 72'	Report	Antonsson 18'; Clisby 57'	Stadium: Perry Park; Attendance: 3,926; Referee: Alireza Faghani

24 September 2023 Semi-finals	Melbourne Knights (Victoria (state))	0–1	Brisbane Roar	Melbourne
18:00 AEST		Report	Waddingham 18'	Stadium: Knights Stadium; Attendance: 5,183; Referee: Daniel Elder

7 October 2023 Final	Sydney FC	3–1	Brisbane Roar	Sydney
19:45 AEDT	Fábio 67' (pen.), 90+1'; Mak 72'	Report	Waddingham 18'	Stadium: Allianz Stadium; Attendance: 15,482; Referee: Ben Abraham

== Statistics ==
=== Appearances and goals ===
Includes all competitions. Players with no appearances not included in the list.

As of 26 April 2024

No.	Pos.	Nat.	Player	A-League Men		Australia Cup		Total					
No.	Pos.	Nat.	Player	Apps	Goals	Apps	Goals	Apps	Goals				
No.	Pos.	Nat.	Player	1	GK	(Australia)	Macklin Freke	26	0	5	0	31	0
2	DF	(Australia)	Scott Neville	7+1	0	3+1	0	12	0				
3	DF	(Australia)	Corey Brown	8+5	1	0	0	13	1				
5	DF	(Scotland)	Tom Aldred	25	1	5	0	30	1				
6	MF	(Australia)	Joe Caletti	16+3	0	5	1	24	1				
7	MF	(France)	Florin Berenguer	16+3	3	2+1	0	22	3				
8	FW	(Australia)	Jonas Markovski	2+14	3	0+2	0	18	3				
10	FW	(Australia)	Nikola Mileusnic	24+3	5	5	1	32	6				
11	FW	(Australia)	Jez Lofthouse	4+10	1	0	0	14	1				
12	MF	(Australia)	Taras Gomulka	12+9	0	0+5	0	26	0				
13	FW	(Australia)	Henry Hore	19+1	7	4	2	24	9				
14	FW	(Australia)	Rylan Brownlie	0+11	1	0	0	11	1				
16	FW	(Australia)	Thomas Waddingham	18+5	7	5	4	28	11				
17	FW	(Australia)	Carlo Armiento	4+7	0	4	1	15	1				
18	MF	(Australia)	Shae Cahill	0+2	0	0	0	2	0				
19	DF	(Sri Lanka)	Jack Hingert	20+2	1	5	0	27	1				
20	FW	(New Zealand)	Marco Rojas	3+4	2	0	0	7	2				
21	DF	(Australia)	Antonee Burke-Gilroy	13+4	0	0	0	17	0				
22	FW	(Australia)	Alex Parsons	4+7	0	0+5	1	16	1				
23	MF	(Australia)	Keegan Jelacic	10+1	1	0	0	11	1				
26	MF	(Republic of Ireland)	Jay O'Shea	25+1	7	5	1	31	8				
27	DF	(Australia)	Kai Trewin	24+2	1	2+1	0	29	1				
29	GK	(Australia)	Matt Acton	1	0	0	0	1	0				
30	MF	(Australia)	Quinn MacNicol	0+2	0	0+2	1	4	1				
32	DF	(Australia)	James Nikolovski	3+3	0	0+2	0	8	0				
35	MF	(Australia)	Louis Zabala	10+7	0	5	1	22	1				
44	DF	(Australia)	Ryan Lethlean	2	0	0	0	2	0				
55	DF	(Australia)	Nathan Geyer	0	0	0+1	0	1	0				
99	FW	(South Sudan)	Ayom Majok	1+9	1	0+3	0	13	1				
Player(s) transferred out but featured this season
23	DF	(Australia)	Aaron Reardon	0+2	0	0	0	2	0				

=== Disciplinary record ===
Includes all competitions. The list is sorted by squad number when total cards are equal. Players with no cards not included in the list.

As of 26 April 2024

Rank	No.	Pos.	Nat.	Name	A-League Men			Australia Cup			Total		
Rank	No.	Pos.	Nat.	Name	Booked	(yellow card) (yellow-red card)	Sent off (straight red)	Booked	(yellow card) (yellow-red card)	Sent off (straight red)	Booked	(yellow card) (yellow-red card)	Sent off (straight red)
1	26	MF	(Republic of Ireland)	Jay O'Shea	3	0	1	1	0	0	4	0	1
2	23	MF	(Australia)	Keegan Jelacic	1	0	1	0	0	0	1	0	1
3	6	MF	(Australia)	Joe Caletti	2	1	0	0	0	0	2	1	0
4	13	FW	(Australia)	Henry Hore	4	0	0	3	0	0	7	0	0
4	5	DF	(Scotland)	Tom Aldred	7	0	0	0	0	0	7	0	0
6	19	DF	(Sri Lanka)	Jack Hingert	6	0	0	0	0	0	6	0	0
7	35	MF	(Australia)	Louis Zabala	3	0	0	1	0	0	4	0	0
8	1	GK	(Australia)	Macklin Freke	3	0	0	0	0	0	3	0	0
8	2	DF	(Australia)	Scott Neville	3	0	0	0	0	0	3	0	0
8	17	FW	(Australia)	Carlo Armiento	2	0	0	1	0	0	3	0	0
8	32	DF	(Australia)	James Nikolovski	2	0	0	1	0	0	3	0	0
12	3	DF	(Australia)	Corey Brown	2	0	0	0	0	0	2	0	0
12	8	FW	(Australia)	Jonas Markovski	1	0	0	1	0	0	2	0	0
12	11	FW	(Australia)	Jez Lofthouse	2	0	0	0	0	0	2	0	0
12	21	DF	(Australia)	Antonee Burke-Gilroy	2	0	0	0	0	0	2	0	0
12	22	FW	(Australia)	Alex Parsons	1	0	0	1	0	0	2	0	0
12	27	DF	(Australia)	Kai Trewin	1	0	0	1	0	0	2	0	0
12	99	FW	(South Sudan)	Ayom Majok	2	0	0	0	0	0	2	0	0
19	7	MF	(France)	Florin Berenguer	0	0	0	1	0	0	1	0	0
19	10	FW	(Australia)	Nikola Mileusnic	1	0	0	0	0	0	1	0	0
19	14	FW	(Australia)	Rylan Brownlie	1	0	0	0	0	0	1	0	0
19	44	DF	(Australia)	Ryan Lethlean	1	0	0	0	0	0	1	0	0
Total					50	1	2	11	0	0	61	1	2

=== Clean sheets ===
Includes all competitions. The list is sorted by squad number when total clean sheets are equal. Numbers in parentheses represent games where both goalkeepers participated and both kept a clean sheet; the number in parentheses is awarded to the goalkeeper who was substituted on, whilst a full clean sheet is awarded to the goalkeeper who was on the field at the start and end of play. Goalkeepers with no clean sheets not included in the list.

As of 26 April 2024

Rank	No.	Nat.	Goalkeeper	A-League Men	Australia Cup	Total
1	1	(Australia)	Macklin Freke	3	2	5
Total				3	2	5

== See also ==
- 2023–24 Brisbane Roar FC (A-League Women) season
