= 2023 Australia Cup final =

Sydney FC and Brisbane Roar Cup soccer match 2023

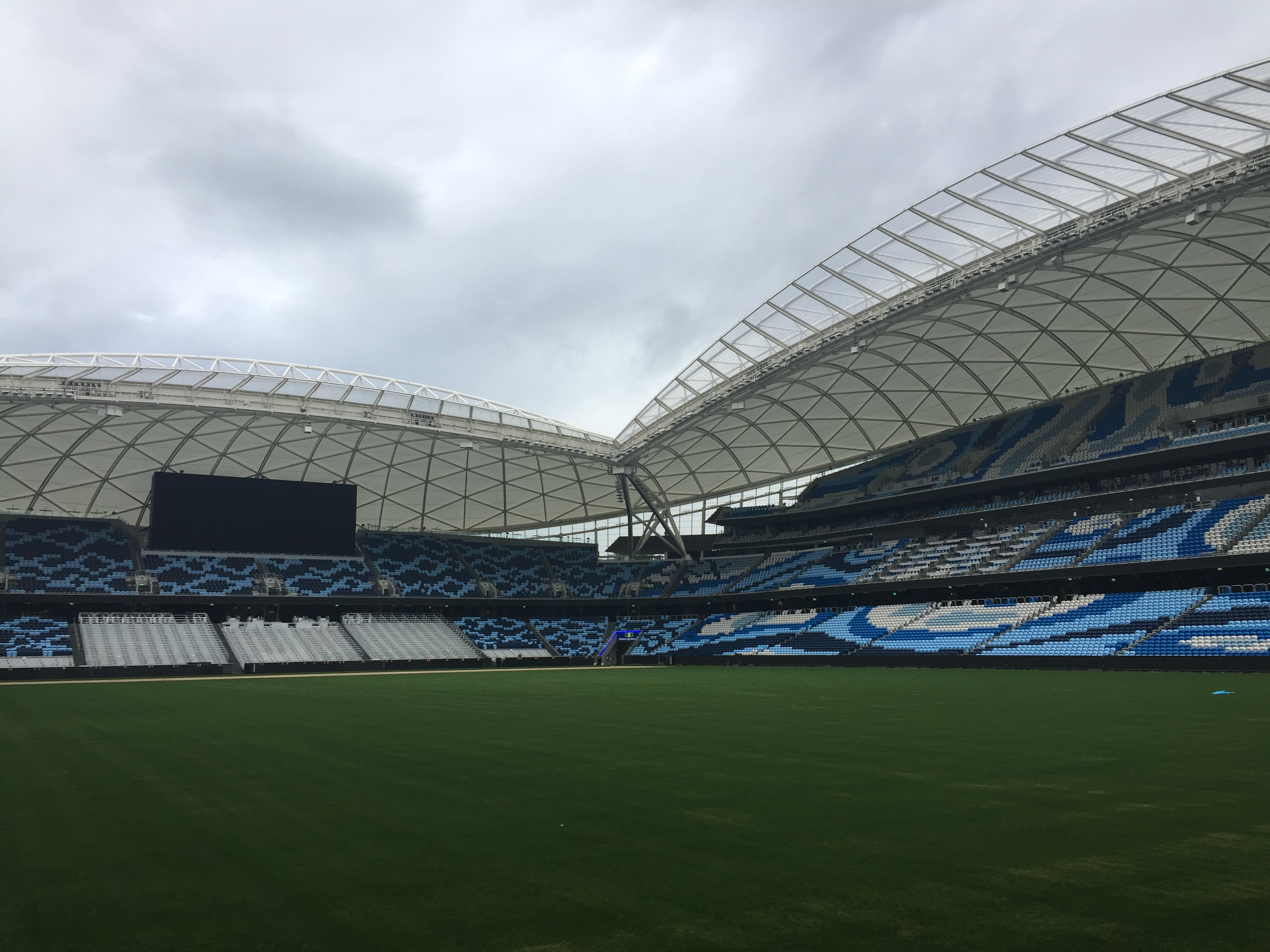
- The match took place at Allianz Stadium
- Event: 2023 Australia Cup
| Sydney FC | Brisbane Roar |
| 3 | 1 |
- Date: 7 October 2023
- Venue: Allianz Stadium, Sydney
- Man of the Match: Joe Lolley (Sydney FC)
- Referee: Ben Abraham
- Attendance: 15,482

The 2023 Australia Cup final was a soccer match played between A-League Men sides Sydney FC and Brisbane Roar at Allianz Stadium in Sydney on 7 October 2023. It was the 9th Australia Cup final. The venue was originally set at Suncorp Stadium in Brisbane, but was changed due to irrigation work.

The match was refereed by Ben Abraham. Sydney FC won the match 3–1, achieving their first trophy in three years and their second cup trophy since 2017. Joe Lolley was awarded the Mark Viduka Medal. As winners, Sydney FC earned a spot in the 2024–25 AFC Champions League Two.

The match was broadcast on Network 10 and 10 Bold, with a crowd of 15,482 present at Allianz Stadium.

== Route to the final ==
| Sydney FC | | Round | Brisbane Roar | |
|---|---|---|---|---|
| Opponent | Score | | Opponent | Score |
| Central Coast Mariners | 3–3 (H); 10–9 (p) | Round of 32 | Newcastle Jets | 3–2 (A) |
| APIA Leichhardt | 2–0 (A) | Round of 16 | Sydney United 58 | 5–0 (A) |
| Western United | 3–0 (H) | Quarter-finals | Western Sydney Wanderers | 4–2 (H) |
| Melbourne City | 2–1 (A) | Semi-finals | Melbourne Knights | 1–0 (A) |
Note: In all results above, the score of the finalist is given first (H: home; A: away).

=== Sydney FC ===
Having finished 5th in the 2022–23 A-League season, Sydney FC started their Australia Cup campaign in the Round of 32 against defending A-League champions Central Coast Mariners at WIN Stadium in Wollongong. The match led into extra time after the score tied 2–2 in regular time. Harry Steele gave the Mariners the lead in the 100th minute before Jaiden Kucharski equalised in the third additional minute of the second half in extra time. Sydney FC eventually triumphed in the penalty shootout, winning 10–9, after Andrew Redmayne saved the Mariners' penalty before converting the winning penalty for his side. In the Round of 16, Sydney FC drew National Premier Leagues (NPL) side APIA Leichhardt away at Leichhardt Oval, winning 2–0 with second half goals from Patrick Wood and Anthony Caceres.

In the quarter-finals, Sydney FC were drawn at home to Western United. The match ended in a 3–0 victory for Sydney FC with Anthony Caceres, Patrick Wood, and Jack Rodwell all scoring to seal the win over United. In their semi-final tie, Sydney FC played against Melbourne City at AAMI Park in Melbourne. Two goals from Joe Lolley and Patrick Wood proved a win for the Sky Blue with Jamie Maclaren scoring a late goal for City to make it 2–1 at full-time.

=== Brisbane Roar ===
Brisbane Roar started their Australia Cup run with an away game against Newcastle Jets in the Round of 32. Brisbane Roar won the match 3–2 in extra time against Newcastle Jets, a player down after Brandon O'Neill was sent off for two bookings. Alex Parsons scored the winner in the 118th minute to send Brisbane Roar to the Round of 16. The match also saw 15-year-old Quinn MacNicol, the youngest debutant for the club, coming on in extra time for Carlo Armiento. In the next round, Brisbane Roar faced NPL side Sydney United 58, who were runners-up in the previous cup campaign and had defeated the Roar in that same run. However, Brisbane won the match 5–0 at Sydney United Sports Centre, avenging their loss from last season at the same venue. Quinn MacNicol scored the fifth goal for the Roar, becoming the youngest goalscorer in the cup at 15 years and 228 days.

In the quarter-final, Brisbane Roar were drawn against fellow A-League opposition Western Sydney Wanderers at Perry Park. The Roar won 4–2 over the Wanderers as Carlo Armiento, Thomas Waddingham, Joe Caletti and Henry Hore all scored. Brisbane’s semi-final with NPL side Melbourne Knights took place at Knights Stadium in Melbourne; it was the second time Brisbane has faced an NPL opposition at the same stage. Brisbane Roar won a narrow 1–0 result with Thomas Waddingham scoring the lone goal in the 18th minute of the match in front of 5,183 spectators.

== Match ==
=== Background ===
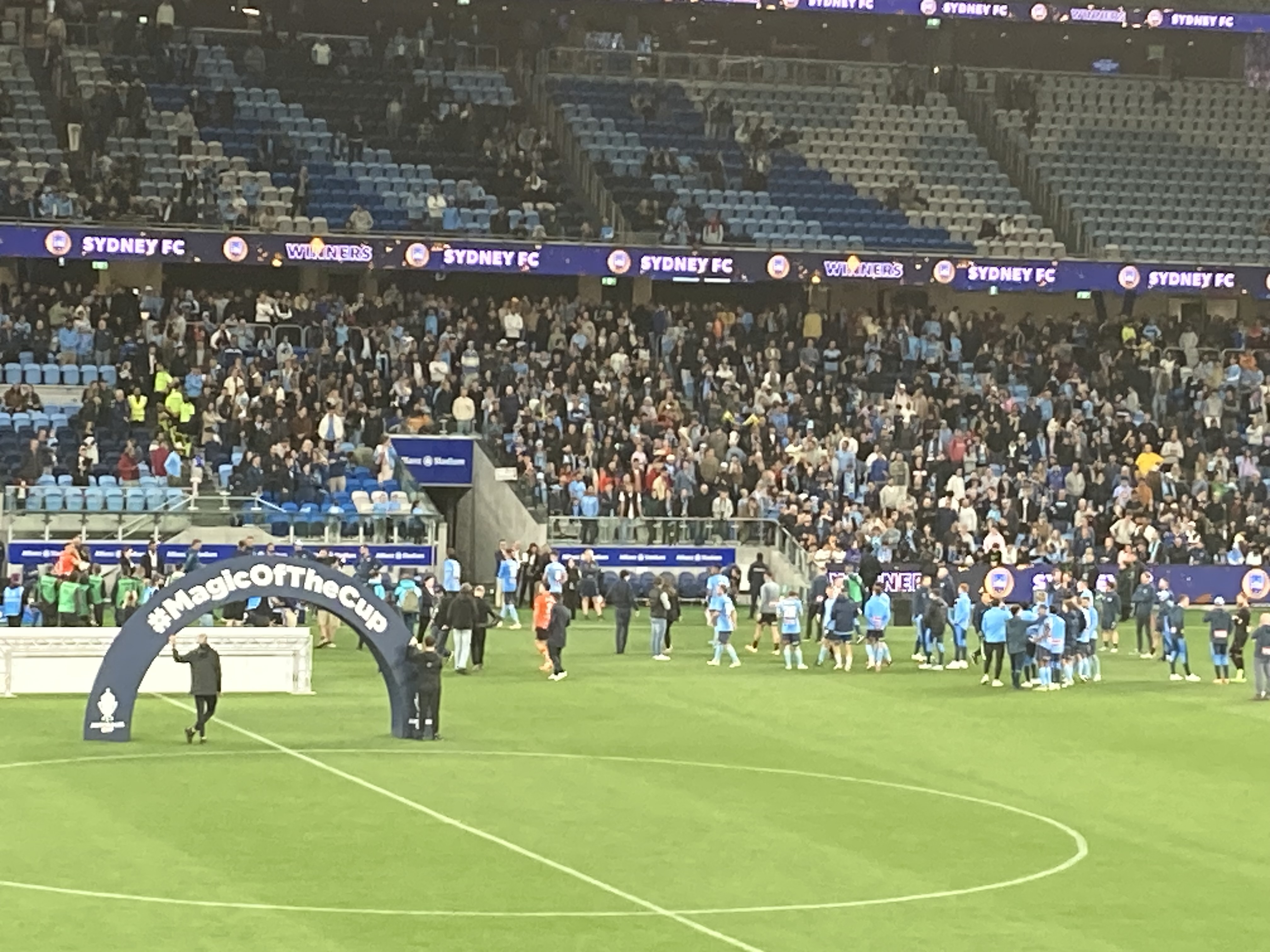

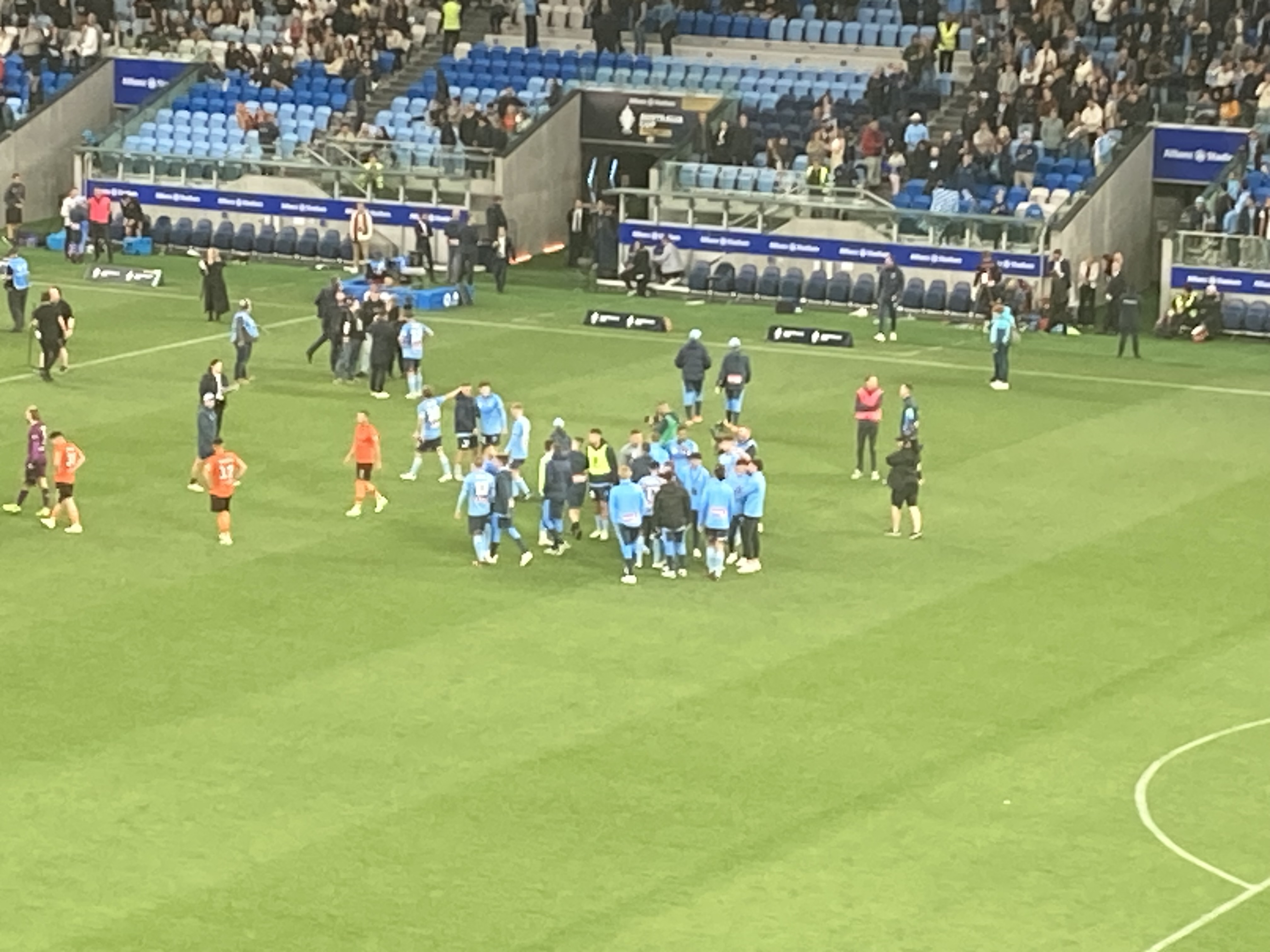
Sydney FC celebrating their 3–1 win over Brisbane Roar.

Brisbane Roar will be participating in their first cup final in hopes of retaining their first silverware in over a decade since their triumph in the 2013–14 A-League season, winning both the premiership and championship. The Roar is also the third Queensland sports team to reach a national decider, following NRL's Brisbane Broncos and AFL's Brisbane Lions, who both qualified for their respective grand finals. In contrast, Sydney FC will be participating in their fourth cup final since becoming runners-up in 2018; they won the year before in 2017. Despite facing greater success than their opponent, Sydney FC has not won a trophy since the 2020 A-League Grand Final. The two finalists have been dubbed the State of Origin in football/soccer due to the club's geographical locations in their states, New South Wales and Queensland. In light of this, Brisbane Roar donned the maroon shirt in the past, like their rugby counterparts Queensland Maroons, against Sydney FC in the 2016–17 A-League season. The 2023 Australia Cup final was the 9th final of the competition overall.

Football Australia decided the venue and date for the final. Suncorp Stadium in Brisbane was set as the initial venue with a set date being between 7–8 October 2023, depending on the availability of the ground. However, it was deemed unable to host due to irrigation work in preparation for the 2023–24 A-League season. It would have been the first time Brisbane Roar hosted a major final since 2014 where they attracted 51,153 fans in the Grand Final against Western Sydney Wanderers. Other stadiums in Queensland were considered but deemed unfit; both Ballymore Stadium and Dolphin Stadium (Redcliffe, Queensland) were rejected for renovation and low capacity respectively. It was announced on 26 September 2023 that the venue would be held in Allianz Stadium in Sydney on 7 October 2023. The match was broadcast on Network 10 in every major city except Perth which broadcast the match on 10 Bold. Ben Abraham was the referee of the match. He was assisted by Josh Mannella and Brad Wright, with Tim Danaskos and Arvin Shanmuganathan selected as the fourth and fifth official respectively.

=== Details ===
7 October 2023
19:45 AEDT

| Sydney FC (1) | 3–1 | Brisbane Roar (1) |
|---|---|---|
| Fábio 67' (pen.), 90+1'; Mak 72' | Report | Waddingham 18' |

Allianz Stadium, Sydney
Attendance: 15,482
Referee: Ben Abraham

| Sydney FC | Brisbane Roar |

| GK | 1 | (Australia) Andrew Redmayne |
| RB | 23 | (Australia) Rhyan Grant |
| CB | 8 | (Australia) Jake Girdwood-Reich | (yellow card) 39' |
| CB | 15 | (Brazil) Gabriel Lacerda |
| LB | 4 | (Australia) Jordan Courtney-Perkins | | (substituted off) 46' |
| CM | 26 | (Australia) Luke Brattan |
| CM | 12 | (Australia) Corey Hollman | | (substituted off) 46' |
| AM | 10 | (Slovakia) Róbert Mak | | (substituted off) 85' |
| AM | 17 | (Australia) Anthony Caceres |
| AM | 11 | (England) Joe Lolley |
| CF | 13 | (Australia) Patrick Wood | | (substituted off) 65' |
Substitutes:
| GK | 30 | (Australia) Adam Pavlesic |
| DF | 3 | (Australia) Aaron Gurd |
| MF | 22 | (Australia) Max Burgess | | (substituted on) 46' |
| MF | 27 | (Australia) Kealey Adamson | | (substituted on) 46' |
| FW | 9 | (Brazil) Fábio Gomes | | (substituted on) 65' |
| FW | 25 | (Australia) Jaiden Kucharski | | (substituted on) 85' |
| FW | 28 | (Australia) Nathan Amanatidis |
Manager:
(Australia) Steve Corica

| GK | 1 | (Australia) Macklin Freke |
| RB | 19 | (Australia) Jack Hingert |
| CB | 2 | (Australia) Scott Neville |
| CB | 5 | (Scotland) Tom Aldred |
| LB | 35 | (Australia) Louis Zabala | (substituted off) 79' |
| CM | 26 | (Republic of Ireland) Jay O'Shea |
| CM | 6 | (Australia) Joe Caletti | (substituted off) 79' |
| AM | 10 | (Australia) Nikola Mileusnic | (substituted off) 65' |
| AM | 7 | (France) Florin Berenguer |
| AM | 13 | (Australia) Henry Hore |
| CF | 15 | (Australia) Thomas Waddingham | (substituted off) 61' |
Substitutes:
| GK | 29 | (Australia) Matt Acton |
| DF | 27 | (Australia) Kai Trewin | (substituted on) 79' |
| DF | 32 | (Australia) James Nikolovski |
| MF | 12 | (Australia) Taras Gomulka | (substituted on) 61' |
| MF | 30 | (Australia) Quinn MacNicol |
| FW | 14 | (Australia) Jonas Markovski | (substituted on) 79' |
| FW | 22 | (Australia) Alex Parsons | (substituted on) 65' |
Manager:
(Australia) Ross Aloisi

Assistant referees:
Josh Mannella
Brad Wright
Fourth official:
Tim Danaskos
Fifth official:
Arvin Shanmuganathan

Match rules

- 90 minutes
- 30 minutes of extra time if necessary
- Penalty shoot-out if scores still level
- Seven named substitutes

=== Statistics ===
First half
| Statistic | Sydney FC | Brisbane Roar |
|---|---|---|
| Goals scored | 0 | 1 |
| Total shots | 6 | 5 |
| Shots on target | 1 | 1 |
| Saves | 0 | 1 |
| Ball possession | 42% | 58% |
| Corner kicks | 3 | 4 |
| Fouls committed | 3 | 6 |
| Offsides | 0 | 0 |
| Yellow cards | 1 | 0 |
| Red cards | 0 | 0 |

Second half
| Statistic | Sydney FC | Brisbane Roar |
|---|---|---|
| Goals scored | 3 | 0 |
| Total shots | 13 | 3 |
| Shots on target | 6 | 1 |
| Saves | 1 | 3 |
| Ball possession | 54% | 46% |
| Corner kicks | 4 | 1 |
| Fouls committed | 5 | 4 |
| Offsides | 3 | 2 |
| Yellow cards | 0 | 0 |
| Red cards | 0 | 0 |

Overall
| Statistic | Sydney FC | Brisbane Roar |
|---|---|---|
| Goals scored | 3 | 1 |
| Total shots | 19 | 8 |
| Shots on target | 7 | 2 |
| Saves | 1 | 4 |
| Ball possession | 48% | 52% |
| Corner kicks | 7 | 5 |
| Fouls committed | 8 | 10 |
| Offsides | 3 | 2 |
| Yellow cards | 1 | 0 |
| Red cards | 0 | 0 |

== Post match ==
Sydney FC achieved their first silverware in three years and their second cup trophy since the 2017 FFA Cup final. Sydney FC also qualified for the 2024–25 AFC Cup and lifted the cup in front of a crowd of 15,482 at Allianz Stadium. Joe Lolley of Sydney FC was awarded the Mark Viduka Medal. Thomas Waddingham, the opening goalscorer of the match for Brisbane Roar, became the youngest player to score in the cup final at the age of 18; it was his fourth goal in five games in the Australia Cup.
