= 2022–23 Brisbane Roar FC season =

Brisbane Roar
2022–23 season
- Chairman: Rahim Soekasah
- Manager: Warren Moon (to 20 February 2023); Nick Green (from 21 February 2023)
- Stadium: Suncorp Stadium; Kayo Stadium
- A-League Men: 8th
- A-League Men Finals: DNQ
- Australia Cup: Semi-finals
- Top goalscorer: League: Jay O'Shea (9); All: Jay O'Shea (10)
- Highest home attendance: 12,063 vs. Sydney FC (24 April 2022); A-League Men
- Lowest home attendance: 3,462 vs. Western United (18 March 2023); A-League Men
- Average home league attendance: 5,629
- Biggest win: 3–0 vs. Newcastle Jets (H) (8 April 2023); A-League Men
- Biggest defeat: 0–4 vs. Newcastle Jets (A) (27 January 2023); A-League Men
Home colours	Away colours	Third colours
- All statistics correct as of 29 April 2023.

The 2022–23 season was the club's 18th professional season in the history of Brisbane Roar Football Club. The club participated in the A-League Men for the 18th time and participated in the Australia Cup for the eighth time.

== Players ==
Note: Flags indicate national team as defined under FIFA eligibility rules; some limited exceptions apply. Players may hold more than one non-FIFA nationality.

No.	Pos.	Nation	Player
1	GK	AUS	Macklin Freke
2	DF	AUS	Scott Neville
3	DF	AUS	Jordan Courtney-Perkins (on loan from Raków Częstochowa)
5	DF	SCO	Tom Aldred (captain)
7	MF	AFG	Rahmat Akbari
10	FW	AUS	Nikola Mileusnic
11	MF	AUS	Jez Lofthouse
12	MF	AUS	Taras Gomulka
13	FW	AUS	Henry Hore
14	FW	AUS	Robbie Kruse
15	DF	AUS	Noah Smith
16	DF	AUS	Josh Brindell-South

No.	Pos.	Nation	Player
17	FW	AUS	Carlo Armiento
19	DF	SRI	Jack Hingert
21	MF	AUT	Marcel Canadi
22	FW	SRB	Stefan Šćepović
23	GK	AUS	Jordan Holmes
26	MF	IRL	Jay O'Shea
27	DF	AUS	Kai Trewin
28	FW	AUS	Joe Knowles
32	DF	AUS	James Nikolovski (scholarship)
35	MF	AUS	Louis Zabala
99	FW	AUS	Ayom Majok (scholarship)

== Transfers ==
=== Transfers in ===
No.	Position	Player	Transferred from	Type/fee	Contract length	Date	Ref
9	FW	(England) Charlie Austin	(England) Queens Park Rangers	Free transfer	2+ years	27 June 2022	
8	MF	(Japan) Riku Danzaki	(Japan) Consadole Sapporo	Loan	6 months	9 July 2022	
17	FW	Carlo Armiento	Perth Glory	Free transfer		14 September 2022	
28	FW	Joe Knowles	(Australia) Oakleigh Cannons	Free transfer	1 year	16 September 2022	
3	DF	Jordan Courtney-Perkins	(Poland) Raków Częstochowa	Loan	1 year	16 September 2022	
21	MF	(Austria) Marcel Canadi	(Croatia) Šibenik	Free transfer	6 months	20 January 2023	
12	MF	Taras Gomulka	Melbourne City	Free transfer		1 February 2023	
14	FW	Robbie Kruse	Unattached	Free transfer	6 months	2 February 2023	
22	FW	(Serbia) Stefan Šćepović	(Cyprus) AEL Limassol	Free transfer	6 months	7 February 2023	
15	DF	Noah Smith	Melbourne Victory	Free transfer	1.5 years	7 February 2023	

==== From youth squad ====
N	Pos.	Nat.	Name	Age	Notes
32	DF	(Australia)	James Nikolovski	20	scholarship contract
99	FW	(Australia)	Ayom Majok	20	scholarship contract

=== Transfers out ===
No.	Position	Player	Transferred to	Type/fee	Date	Ref.
18	FW	(Japan) Ryo Wada	(Japan) Sagan Tosu	End of loan	17 May 2022	
21	MF	Nicholas Olsen	Unattached	End of contract	17 May 2022	
22	FW	Alex Parsons	Unattached	End of contract	17 May 2022	
23	FW	(Argentina) Juan Lescano	Unattached	Mutual contract termination	9 July 2022	
3	DF	Corey Brown	Unattached	Contract termination	18 August 2022	
9	FW	Luke Ivanovic	Perth Glory	Mutual contract termination	14 September 2022	
9	FW	(England) Charlie Austin	Unattached	Mutual contract termination	14 December 2022	
15	MF	Jesse Daley	(Canada) Cavalry FC	Undisclosed	15 December 2022	
18	MF	(Germany) Matti Steinmann	Unattached	Mutual contract termination	27 December 2022	
29	FW	Cyrus Dehmie	(Denmark) Næstved Boldklub	Free transfer	17 January 2023	
8	MF	(Japan) Riku Danzaki	(Japan) Consadole Sapporo	End of loan	28 January 2023	
4	DF	Anton Mlinaric	(Australia) Oakleigh Cannons	Mutual contract termination	7 February 2023	
6	DF	Connor Chapman	Melbourne Victory	Mutual contract termination	7 February 2023	

=== Contract extensions ===
No.	Name	Position	Duration	Date	Notes
4	Anton Mlinaric	Centre-back		25 May 2022	Permanent contract following loan
13	Henry Hore	Attacking midfielder	3 years	1 June 2022	

== Pre-season and friendlies ==
Brisbane Roar	0–2	Western Sydney Wanderers	Gold Coast
	Report	Amalfitano; Ngbakoto

14 July 2022 Queensland Champions Cup	Brisbane Roar	1–2	(England) Leeds United	Gold Coast, Australia
19:45 AEST	Knowles 40'	Report	James 23'; Gelhardt 25'	Stadium: Cbus Super Stadium

20 July 2022 Queensland Champions Cup	Brisbane Roar	0–1	(England) Aston Villa	Townsville, Australia
19:45 AEST		Report	Archer 77'	Stadium: Queensland Country Bank Stadium

27 August 2022 Fraser Coast Tour	Football Wide Bay Select XI (Queensland)	0–7	Brisbane Roar	Nikenbah
14:30 AEST		Report	Danzaki 18', 32'; Austin 28'; Mileusnic ?'; Waddingham 55'; ? ?'; ? ?'	Stadium: Fraser Coast Sports and Recreation Precinct

4 September 2022	Brisbane Roar	1–1	Melbourne Victory	Kippa-Ring
15:00 AEST	Ivanovic 57' (pen.)	Report	D'Agostino 15'	Stadium: A.J. Kelly Park

17 September 2022	Rochedale Rovers (Australia)	0–8	Brisbane Roar	Brisbane
17:00 AEST		Report	? ?' (o.g.); Hore 20', 59'; Austin 24'; Mileusnic 38'; Dehmie 62'; Lofthouse 70'; Daley 72' (pen.)	Stadium: Underwood Park

== Competitions ==
=== Overall record ===
Competition	First match	Last match	Starting round	Final position	Record							
Competition	First match	Last match	Starting round	Final position	Pld	W	D	L	GF	GA	GD	Win %
A-League Men	8 October 2022	29 April 2023	Matchday 1	8th	26	7	9	10	26	33	−7	26.92
Australia Cup	27 July 2022	11 September 2022	Round of 32	Semi-finals	4	2	1	1	9	7	+2	50.00
Total					30	9	10	11	35	40	−5	30.00

Last updated: 29 April 2023
Source: Soccerway

=== A-League Men ===
==== League table ====
Pos	Team	Pld	W	D	L	GF	GA	GD	Pts	Qualification
6	Wellington Phoenix (Note: Wellington Phoenix cannot qualify for Asian Football Confederation competitions as they are based in New Zealand, which is under the Oceania Football Confederation.)	26	9	8	9	39	45	−6	35	Qualification for Finals series (Note: The top two teams enter the finals series at the semi-finals, while the teams ranked third to sixth enter the finals series at the elimination-finals.)
7	Western United	26	9	5	12	34	47	−13	32	
8	Brisbane Roar	26	7	9	10	26	33	−7	30	
9	Perth Glory	26	7	8	11	36	46	−10	29	Qualification for 2023 Australia Cup play-offs
10	Newcastle Jets	26	8	5	13	30	45	−15	29	Qualification for 2023 Australia Cup play-offs

Source: A-Leagues
Rules for classification: 1) Points; 2) Goal difference; 3) Goals scored; 4) Points per game; 5) Least red cards; 6) Least yellow cards; 7) Toss of a coin in an event of a tie of two clubs.

==== Results summary ====
Overall								Home						Away					
Pld	W	D	L	GF	GA	GD	Pts	W	D	L	GF	GA	GD	W	D	L	GF	GA	GD
26	7	9	10	26	33	−7	30	4	5	4	12	11	+1	3	4	6	14	22	−8

Last updated: 29 April 2023.
Source: Ultimate A-League

==== Results by round ====
Round	1	2	3	4	5	7	8	9	10	11	6	12	13	14	15	16	17	18	19	20	21	22	23	24	25	26
Ground	H	H	A	H	H	H	A	H	A	A	A	H	H	A	A	H	A	H	A	A	H	A	H	A	H	A
Result	D	L	D	D	W	D	W	D	D	W	L	L	D	L	L	L	D	W	L	L	W	L	W	D	L	W
Position	7	10	11	11	8	11	8	8	7	5	9	7	7	10	10	10	11	9	10	11	11	12	8	10	11	8
Points	1	1	2	3	6	7	10	11	12	15	15	15	16	16	16	16	17	20	20	20	23	23	26	27	27	30

Updated to match(es) played on 29 April 2023. Source: Ultimate A-League
A = Away; H = Home; W = Win; D = Draw; L = Loss

==== Matches ====
8 October 2022 1	Brisbane Roar	0–0	Macarthur FC	Brisbane
17:00 AEDT		Report		Stadium: Suncorp Stadium; Attendance: 8,521; Referee: Adam Kersey

14 October 2022 2	Brisbane Roar	0–2	Melbourne City	Brisbane
19:45 AEDT		Report	Maclaren 22', 38' (pen.)	Stadium: Suncorp Stadium; Attendance: 7,890; Referee: Tim Danaskos

22 October 2022 3	Western Sydney Wanderers	1–1	Brisbane Roar	Sydney
17:00 AEDT	Krpić 5'	Report	Austin 50'	Stadium: CommBank Stadium; Attendance: 9,766; Referee: Ben Abraham

29 October 2022 4	Brisbane Roar	0–0	Melbourne Victory	Brisbane
15:00 AEDT		Report		Stadium: Moreton Daily Stadium; Attendance: 4,873; Referee: Chris Beath

6 November 2022 5	Brisbane Roar	3–1	Sydney FC	Brisbane
15:00 AEDT	Austin 6'; Armiento 12'; Brindell-South 72'	Report	Caceres 40'	Stadium: Moreton Daily Stadium; Attendance: 5,086; Referee: Jonathan Barreiro

Mid-season break for 2022 FIFA World Cup

9 December 2022 7	Brisbane Roar	1–1	Adelaide United	Brisbane
19:45 AEDT	O'Shea 90+4' (pen.)	Report	Blackwood 72'	Stadium: Kayo Stadium; Attendance: 4,258; Referee: Alex King

16 December 2022 8	Newcastle Jets	0–1	Brisbane Roar	Newcastle
19:45 AEDT		Report	Mileusnic 80'	Stadium: McDonald Jones Stadium; Attendance: 5,135; Referee: Kurt Ams

23 December 2022 9	Brisbane Roar	1–1	Western Sydney Wanderers	Brisbane
19:45 AEDT	Armiento 62'	Report	Bozanic 18'	Stadium: Kayo Stadium; Attendance: 3,487; Referee: Stephen Lucas

30 December 2022 10	Western United	1–1	Brisbane Roar	Melbourne
19:45 AEDT	Prijović 78'	Report	Armiento 28'	Stadium: AAMI Park; Attendance: 2,253; Referee: Shaun Evans

6 January 2023 11	Melbourne Victory	0–1	Brisbane Roar	Melbourne
19:45 AEDT		Report	O'Shea 73'	Stadium: AAMI Park; Attendance: 4,392*; Referee: Kurt Ams

10 January 2023 6	Perth Glory	2–1	Brisbane Roar	Perth
19:30 AEDT	Lachman 34'; Neville 60' (o.g.)	Report	Chapman 56'	Stadium: Macedonia Park; Attendance: 3,492; Referee: Ben Abraham

14 January 2023 12	Brisbane Roar	0–1	Wellington Phoenix	Brisbane
17:00 AEDT		Report	Zawada 65'	Stadium: Kayo Stadium; Attendance: 6,183; Referee: Adam Kersey

21 January 2023 13	Brisbane Roar	0–0	Melbourne City	Brisbane
19:45 AEDT		Report		Stadium: Kayo Stadium; Attendance: 5,565; Referee: Alireza Faghani

27 January 2023 14	Newcastle Jets	4–0	Brisbane Roar	Newcastle
19:45 AEDT	Sotirio 52'; Buhagiar 72'; Mikeltadze 76'; Goodwin 90+4'	Report		Stadium: McDonald Jones Stadium; Attendance: 5,235; Referee: Jonathon Barreiro

4 February 2023 15	Adelaide United	2–1	Brisbane Roar	Adelaide
19:45 AEDT	D'Arrigo 35'; Irankunda 82'	Report	Knowles 37'	Stadium: Coopers Stadium; Attendance: 10,047; Referee: Alex King

10 February 2023 16	Brisbane Roar	1–2	Central Coast Mariners	Brisbane
19:45 AEDT	O'Shea 23' (pen.)	Report	Túlio 19'; Nkololo 69' (pen.)	Stadium: Kayo Stadium; Attendance: 3,245; Referee: Jonathan Barreiro

18 February 2023 17	Sydney FC	1–1	Brisbane Roar	Sydney
17:00 AEDT	Parsons 90+4'	Report	Mileusnic 34'	Stadium: Allianz Stadium; Attendance: 14,168; Referee: Lachlan Keevers

26 February 2023 18	Brisbane Roar	2–1	Perth Glory	Brisbane
17:00 AEDT	Aldred 28'; Hore 45'	Report	Clisby 19'	Stadium: Kayo Stadium; Attendance: 4,653; Referee: Alireza Faghani

5 March 2023 19	Macarthur FC	3–2	Brisbane Roar	Campbelltown
15:00 AEDT	Arabuli 14'; Millar 67'; McGing 90+5'	Report	O'Shea 78'; Lofthouse 80'	Stadium: Campbelltown Stadium; Attendance: 2,232; Referee: Adam Kersey

12 March 2023 20	Melbourne City	2–1	Brisbane Roar	Melbourne
15:00 AEDT	O'Neill 22', 88'	Report	O'Shea 80' (pen.)	Stadium: AAMI Park; Attendance: 4,881; Referee: Jonathon Barreiro

18 March 2023 21	Brisbane Roar	1–0	Western United	Brisbane
17:00 AEDT	O'Shea 81'	Report		Stadium: Kayo Stadium; Attendance: 3,462; Referee: Stephen Lucas

1 April 2023 22	Central Coast Mariners	4–1	Brisbane Roar	Gosford
17:00 AEDT	Túlio 15'; Nisbet 17'; Holmes 30' (o.g.); Cummings 58' (pen.)	Report	O'Shea 82' (pen.)	Stadium: Industree Group Stadium; Attendance: 5,517; Referee: Daniel Elder

8 April 2023 23	Brisbane Roar	3–0	Newcastle Jets	Brisbane
17:00 AEST	Hore 35'; O'Shea 70'; Šćepović 90+3'	Report		Stadium: Kayo Stadium; Attendance: 3,911; Referee: Shane Skinner

16 April 2023 24	Wellington Phoenix	2–2	Brisbane Roar	Auckland
13:00 AEST	Zawada 35' (pen.); Sasse 56'	Report	O'Shea 8' (pen.); Neville 82'	Stadium: Eden Park; Attendance: 8,320; Referee: Stephen Lucas

24 April 2023 25	Brisbane Roar	0–2	Sydney FC	Brisbane
19:00 AEST		Report	Mak 34'; Le Fondre 77'	Stadium: Suncorp Stadium; Attendance: 12,063; Referee: Adam Kersey

29 April 2023 26	Melbourne Victory	0–1	Brisbane Roar	Melbourne
19:45 AEST		Report	Courtney-Perkins 54'	Stadium: AAMI Park; Attendance: 7,019; Referee: Shaun Evans

=== Australia Cup ===
27 July 2022 Round of 32	Heidelberg United	1–3	Brisbane Roar	Melbourne
19:30	Petratos 57' (pen.)	Report	Akbari 2'; Hore 59'; Mileusnic 88'	Stadium: Olympic Village; Referee: Alex King

17 August 2022 Round of 16	Avondale FC	2–2 (1–4 p)	Brisbane Roar	Melbourne
19:30 AEST	Boland 67' (pen.); Zinni 119'	Report	Danzaki 58'; Hore 96'	Stadium: ABD Stadium; Attendance: 500; Referee: Ben Abraham
	Penalties
	Ahmed (penalty scored); Trajceski (penalty missed); Aguek (penalty missed)		(penalty scored) Trewin; (penalty scored) Hore; (penalty scored) Austin; (penalty scored) Chapman

31 August 2022 Quarter-finals	Adelaide United	1–2	Brisbane Roar	Adelaide
19:00 ACST	Ibusuki 42'	Report	O'Shea 7'; Austin 31'	Stadium: ServiceFM Stadium; Attendance: 2,511; Referee: Tim Danaskos

11 September 2022 Semi-finals	Sydney United 58	3–2 (a.e.t.)	Brisbane Roar	Sydney
14:00	Bilic 24'; Antelmi 71'; Trifiro 105'	Report	Danzaki 13'; Austin 63' (pen.)	Stadium: Sydney United Sports Centre; Attendance: 3,177; Referee: Adam Kersey

== Statistics ==
=== Appearances and goals ===
Includes all competitions. Players with no appearances not included in the list.

As of 29 April 2023

No.	Pos.	Nat.	Player	A-League Men		Australia Cup		Total	
No.	Pos.	Nat.	Player	Apps	Goals	Apps	Goals	Apps	Goals
1	GK	(Australia)	Macklin Freke	3+1	0	4	0	8	1
2	DF	(Australia)	Scott Neville	23+1	1	2	0	26	1
3	DF	(Australia)	Jordan Courtney-Perkins	21+4	1	0	0	25	1
5	DF	(Scotland)	Tom Aldred	24	1	2	0	26	1
7	DF	(Afghanistan)	Rahmat Akbari	9+12	0	4	1	26	1
10	FW	(Australia)	Nikola Mileusnic	12+8	2	3+1	1	24	3
11	FW	(Australia)	Jez Lofthouse	8+4	1	1	0	13	1
12	MF	(Australia)	Taras Gomulka	11+1	0	0	0	12	0
13	MF	(Australia)	Henry Hore	15+8	2	2+2	2	27	4
14	FW	(Australia)	Robbie Kruse	0+1	0	0	0	1	0
15	DF	(Australia)	Noah Smith	4+2	0	0	0	6	0
16	DF	(Australia)	Josh Brindell-South	1+8	1	0	0	9	1
17	FW	(Australia)	Carlo Armiento	15+9	3	0	0	24	3
19	DF	(Sri Lanka)	Jack Hingert	20+2	0	2+1	0	25	0
21	MF	(Austria)	Marcel Canadi	0+4	0	0	0	4	0
22	FW	(Serbia)	Stefan Šćepović	9+1	1	0	0	10	1
23	GK	(Australia)	Jordan Holmes	23	0	0	0	23	0
26	MF	(Republic of Ireland)	Jay O'Shea	23+1	9	3	1	27	10
27	DF	(Australia)	Kai Trewin	25+1	0	4	0	30	0
28	FW	(Australia)	Joe Knowles	13+8	1	0	0	21	1
35	MF	(Australia)	Louis Zabala	13+5	1	2+2	0	22	1
99	MF	(Australia)	Ayom Majok	0+3	0	0	0	3	0
Player(s) transferred out but featured this season
4	DF	(Australia)	Anton Mlinaric	0	0	2+1	0	3	0
6	DF	(Australia)	Connor Chapman	12+2	1	4	0	18	1
8	MF	(Japan)	Riku Danzaki	7+5	0	4	2	16	2
9	FW	(England)	Charlie Austin	7	2	4	2	11	4
9	FW	(Australia)	Luke Ivanovic	0	0	0+4	0	4	0
15	MF	(Australia)	Jesse Daley	0+1	0	1+3	0	5	0
29	FW	(Australia)	Cyrus Dehmie	0+6	0	0+1	0	7	0
34	MF	(Australia)	Brandon McMorrow	0	0	0+1	0	1	0

=== Disciplinary record ===
Includes all competitions. The list is sorted by squad number when total cards are equal. Players with no cards not included in the list.

As of 29 April 2023

Rank	No.	Pos.	Nat.	Player	A-League Men			Australia Cup			Total		
Rank	No.	Pos.	Nat.	Player	Booked	(yellow card) (yellow-red card)	Sent off (straight red)	Booked	(yellow card) (yellow-red card)	Sent off (straight red)	Booked	(yellow card) (yellow-red card)	Sent off (straight red)
1	23	GK	(Australia)	Jordan Holmes	1	0	1	0	0	0	1	0	1
2	3	DF	(Australia)	Jordan Courtney-Perkins	4	1	0	0	0	0	4	1	0
3	19	DF	(Sri Lanka)	Jack Hingert	4	0	0	0	1	0	4	1	0
4	26	MF	(Republic of Ireland)	Jay O'Shea	3	1	0	0	0	0	3	1	0
5	2	DF	(Australia)	Scott Neville	7	0	0	0	0	0	7	0	0
6	5	DF	(Scotland)	Tom Aldred	5	0	0	1	0	0	6	0	0
7	7	MF	(Afghanistan)	Rahmat Akbari	2	0	0	0	0	0	2	0	0
7	13	MF	(Australia)	Henry Hore	2	0	0	0	0	0	2	0	0
7	16	DF	(Australia)	Josh Brindell-South	2	0	0	0	0	0	2	0	0
7	17	MF	(Australia)	Carlo Armiento	2	0	0	0	0	0	2	0	0
7	27	DF	(Australia)	Kai Trewin	2	0	0	0	0	0	2	0	0
7	28	FW	(Australia)	Joe Knowles	2	0	0	0	0	0	2	0	0
13	1	GK	(Australia)	Macklin Freke	1	0	0	0	0	0	1	0	0
13	10	FW	(Australia)	Nikola Mileusnic	1	0	0	0	0	0	1	0	0
13	11	FW	(Australia)	Jez Lofthouse	1	0	0	0	0	0	1	0	0
13	12	MF	(Australia)	Taras Gomulka	1	0	0	0	0	0	1	0	0
13	35	MF	(Australia)	Louis Zabala	1	0	0	0	0	0	1	0	0
Player(s) transferred out but featured this season
1	4	DF	(Australia)	Anton Mlinaric	0	0	0	1	0	0	1	0	0
1	6	DF	(Australia)	Connor Chapman	1	0	0	0	0	0	1	0	0
1	9	FW	(England)	Charlie Austin	0	0	0	1	0	0	1	0	0
1	29	FW	(Australia)	Cyrus Dehmie	1	0	0	0	0	0	1	0	0
Total					41	2	1	3	0	0	44	2	1

=== Clean sheets ===
Includes all competitions. The list is sorted by squad number when total clean sheets are equal. Numbers in parentheses represent games where both goalkeepers participated and both kept a clean sheet; the number in parentheses is awarded to the goalkeeper who was substituted on, whilst a full clean sheet is awarded to the goalkeeper who was on the field at the start of play. Goalkeepers with no clean sheets not included in the list.

As of 29 April 2023

Rank	No.	Nat.	Goalkeeper	A-League Men	Australia Cup	Total
1	23	(Australia)	Jordan Holmes	7	0	7
2	1	(Australia)	Macklin Freke	1 (1)	0	1 (1)
Total				8 (1)	0	8 (1)

== See also ==
- 2022–23 in Australian soccer
- List of Brisbane Roar FC seasons
