= List of Brisbane Roar FC players (25–99 appearances) =

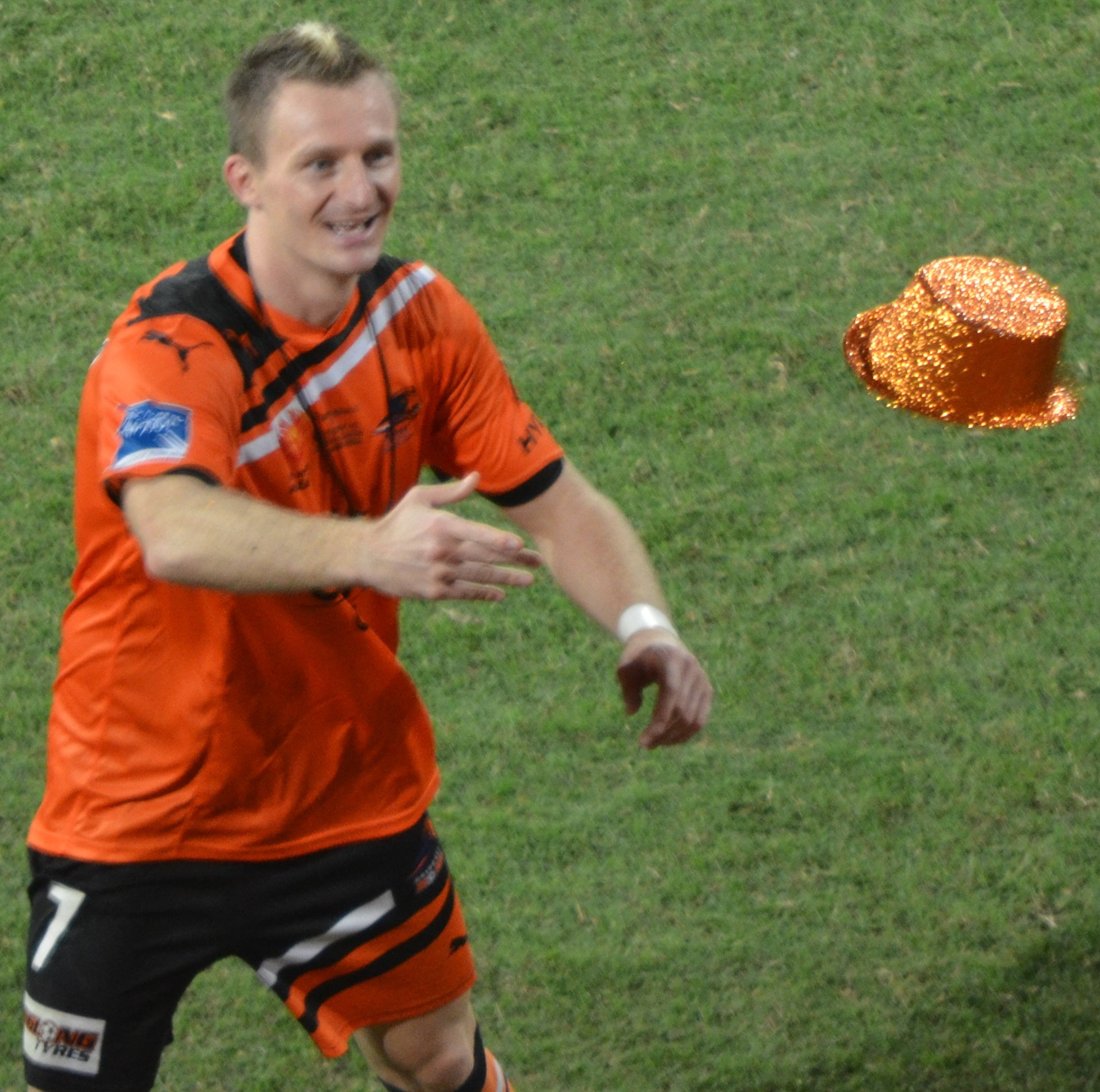
Besart Berisha is Brisbane Roar's all-time top goalscorer with 50 goals from 2011 to 2014.

Brisbane Roar Football Club, an association football club based in Milton, Brisbane, founded in 2005 as Queensland Roar. They became the first Queensland member admitted into the A-League Men in 2005 after a break off with other associated club Queensland Lions. The club's first team have competed in numerous nationally and internationally organised competitions, and all players who have played between 25 and 99 such matches, either as a member of the starting eleven or as a substitute, are listed below.

== Key ==
- The list is ordered first by date of debut, and then if necessary in alphabetical order.
- Appearances as a substitute are included.
- Statistics are correct up to and including the match played on 29 December 2024. Where a player left the club permanently after this date, his statistics are updated to his date of leaving.

Positions key
| GK | Goalkeeper |
| DF | Defender |
| MF | Midfielder |
| FW | Forward |

Nationality
Unless otherwise noted, the nationality of a player is determined by the country/countries which he has played for, or if said person has not played international football, their country of birth.
Position
Playing positions are listed according to the tactical formations that were employed at the time.
Club career
Club career is defined as the first and last calendar years in which the player appeared for the club in any of the competitions listed below.
Total appearances and Total goals
Total appearances and goals comprise those in the A-League Men regular season and finals series, A-League Pre-Season Challenge Cup, Australia Cup, AFC Champions League and the 2005 Australian Club World Championship Qualifying Tournament

== Players ==
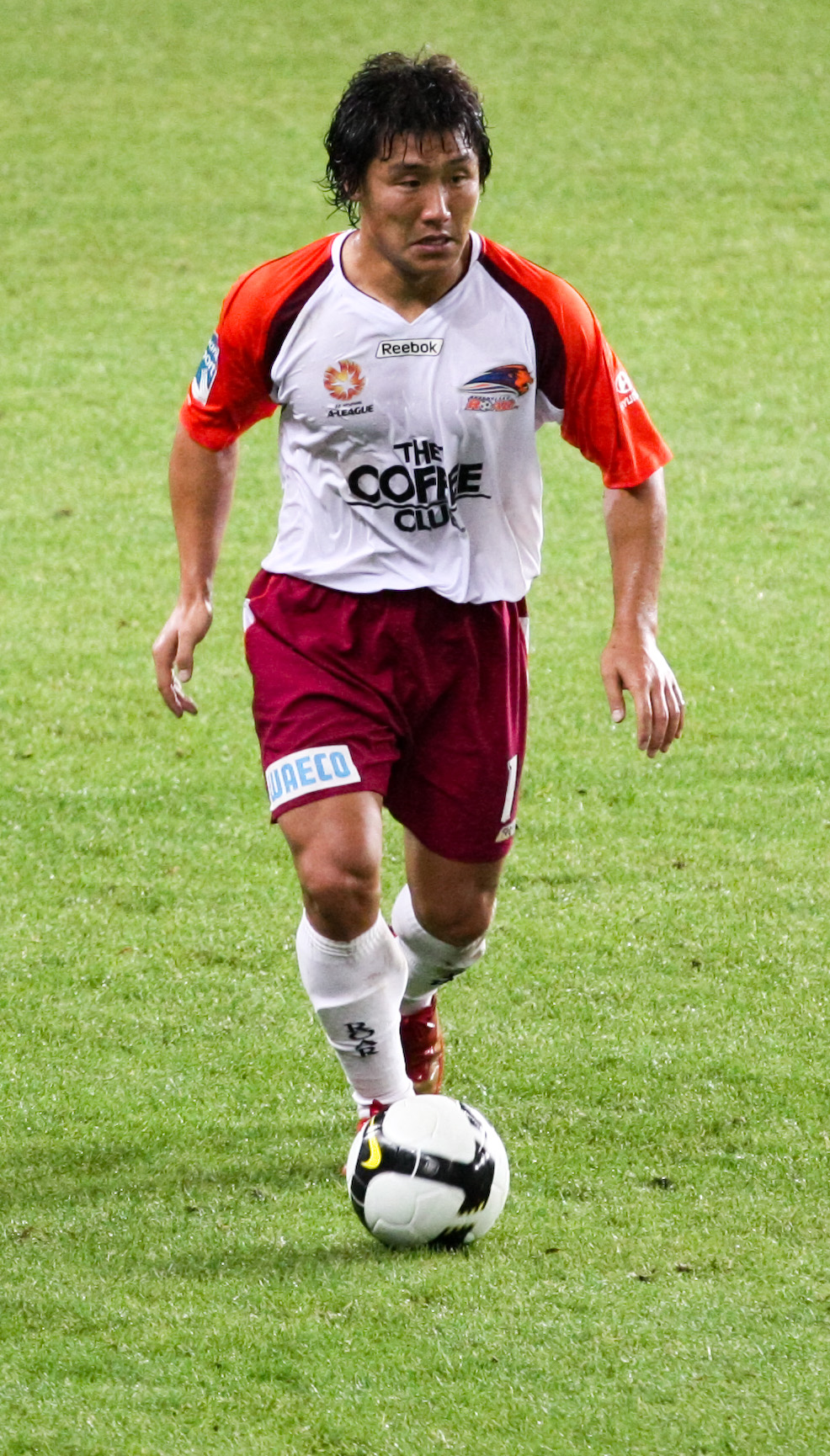
Seo Hyuk-su played 87 times for the Brisbane Roar from 2005 to 2009.

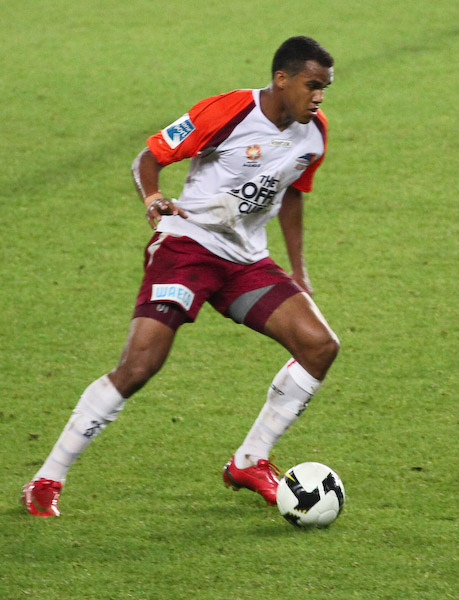
Brazilian striker Reinaldo played 98 games, scoring 26 goals in two stints for the club.

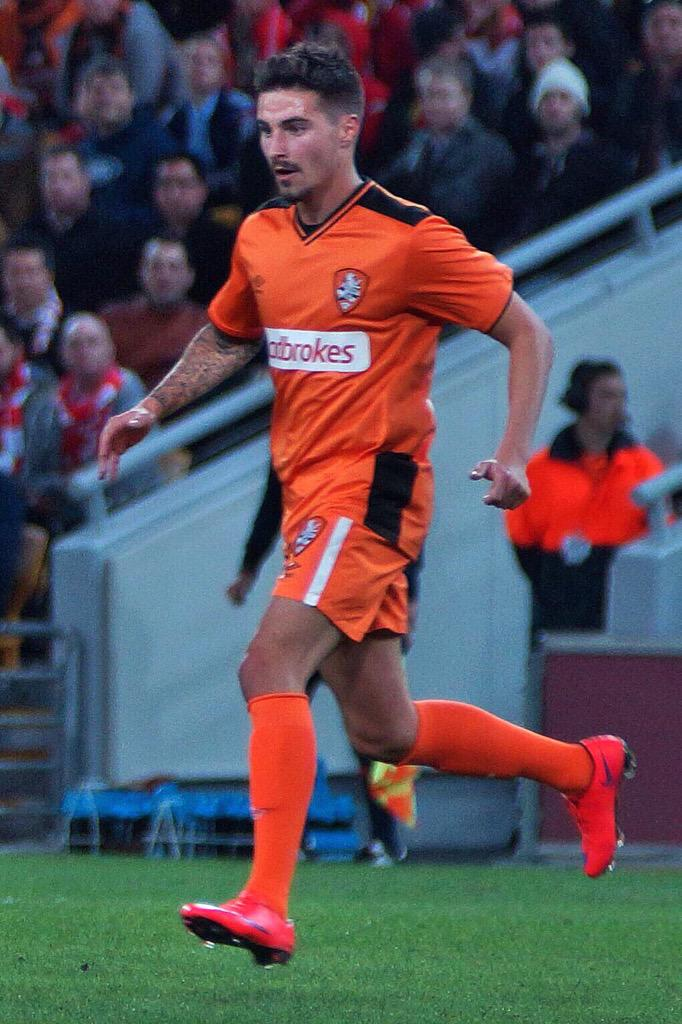
Jamie Maclaren scored 43 goals in 61 matches from 2015 to 2017.

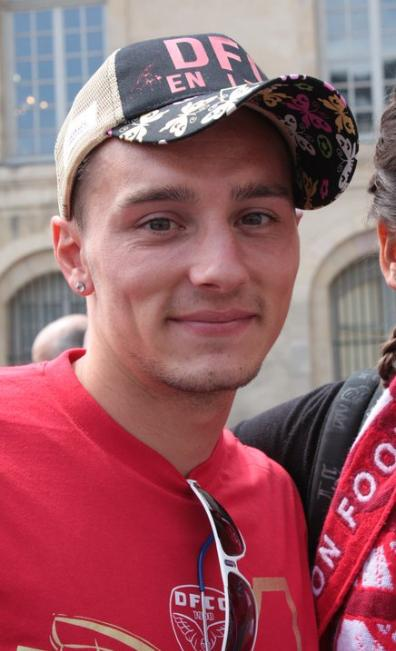
Eric Bauthéac played 47 times who scored 10 goals in two club seasons.

Players highlighted in bold are still actively playing at Brisbane Roar

List of Brisbane Roar players with between 25 and 99 appearances
| Player | Nationality | Pos | Club career | Starts | Subs | Total | Goals |
| Player | Nationality | Pos | Club career | Appearances | | | Goals |
|---|---|---|---|---|---|---|---|
| Remo Buess | Switzerland | DF | 2005–2007 | 35 | 3 | 38 | 0 |
| Chad Gibson | Australia | DF | 2005–2007 | 30 | 2 | 32 | 0 |
| Seo Hyuk-su | South Korea | DF | 2005–2009 | 85 | 2 | 87 | 2 |
| Tom Willis | Australia | GK | 2005–2007 | 23 | 2 | 25 | 0 |
| Spase Dilevski | Australia | DF | 2005–2007 | 31 | 8 | 39 | 2 |
| Ben Griffin | Australia | DF | 2005–2009 | 25 | 17 | 42 | 1 |
| Stuart McLaren | Australia | MF | 2005–2008 | 27 | 11 | 38 | 1 |
| Reinaldo | Brazil | FW | 2006–2008; 2008–2010 | 84 | 14 | 98 | 26 |
| Ante Milicic | Australia | FW | 2006–2008 | 19 | 14 | 33 | 6 |
| Sasa Ognenovski | Australia | DF | 2006–2008 | 46 | 2 | 48 | 3 |
| Andrew Packer | Australia | DF | 2006–2010 | 66 | 8 | 74 | 0 |
| Liam Reddy | Australia | GK | 2006–2009 | 76 | 0 | 76 | 0 |
| Simon Lynch | Scotland | FW | 2006–2008 | 24 | 19 | 43 | 8 |
| Tahj Minniecon | Australia | FW | 2007–2009 | 14 | 13 | 27 | 4 |
| Danny Tiatto | Australia | DF | 2007–2010 | 51 | 5 | 56 | 2 |
| Michael Zullo | Australia | DF | 2007–2010 | 36 | 21 | 57 | 3 |
| Craig Moore | Australia | DF | 2007–2009 | 65 | 0 | 65 | 3 |
| Robbie Kruse | Australia | FW | 2007–2009; 2023 | 21 | 7 | 28 | 4 |
| Sergio van Dijk | Indonesia | FW | 2008–2010 | 53 | 0 | 53 | 27 |
| Charlie Miller | Scotland | FW | 2008–2009 | 26 | 7 | 33 | 8 |
| Matt Mundy | Australia | DF | 2008–2012 | 15 | 14 | 29 | 0 |
| Adam Sarota | Australia | DF | 2008–2010; 2014–2015 | 22 | 7 | 29 | 0 |
| Tommy Oar | Australia | FW | 2007–2010; 2016–2017 | 40 | 18 | 58 | 4 |
| Kosta Barbarouses | New Zealand | FW | 2010–2011 | 29 | 4 | 33 | 12 |
| Erik Paartalu | Australia | MF | 2010–2013 | 85 | 0 | 85 | 10 |
| Milan Susak | Australia | DF | 2010–2011 | 25 | 4 | 29 | 0 |
| Jean Carlos Solórzano | Costa Rica | FW | 2010–2011; 2014–2016 | 34 | 29 | 63 | 18 |
| Rocky Visconte | Australia | FW | 2010–2013 | 8 | 19 | 27 | 2 |
| James Meyer | Australia | MF | 2010–2013 | 6 | 22 | 28 | 6 |
| Besart Berisha | Kosovo | FW | 2011–2014 | 82 | 1 | 83 | 50 |
| Matthew Jurman | Australia | FW | 2011–2013 | 28 | 9 | 37 | 0 |
| Sayed Mohamed Adnan | Bahrain | DF | 2011–2012 | 25 | 4 | 29 | 1 |
| Nick Fitzgerald | Australia | DF | 2011–2013 | 11 | 15 | 26 | 2 |
| Ben Halloran | Australia | MF | 2012–2013; 2024– | 26 | 11 | 37 | 4 |
| Steven Lustica | Australia | MF | 2013; 2014–2016 | 34 | 36 | 70 | 8 |
| Liam Miller | Ireland | MF | 2013–2014 | 23 | 2 | 25 | 3 |
| Brandon Borrello | Australia | FW | 2013–2017 | 69 | 22 | 91 | 20 |
| Daniel Bowles | Australia | DF | 2011; 2014–2020 | 73 | 18 | 91 | 1 |
| Jamie Maclaren | Australia | FW | 2015–2017 | 57 | 4 | 61 | 43 |
| Corona | Spain | MF | 2015–2016 | 29 | 0 | 29 | 2 |
| Nicholas D'Agostino | Australia | FW | 2015–2019 | 16 | 26 | 42 | 3 |
| Jacob Pepper | Australia | MF | 2016–2020 | 60 | 11 | 71 | 1 |
| Brett Holman | Australia | MF | 2016–2018 | 38 | 7 | 45 | 11 |
| Thomas Kristensen | Denmark | MF | 2016–2019 | 63 | 3 | 66 | 6 |
| **Joe Caletti** | Australia | MF | 2016–2019; 2023– | 48 | 17 | 65 | 1 |
| Dane Ingham | New Zealand | DF | 2017–2019 | 18 | 7 | 25 | 1 |
| Avraam Papadopoulos | Greece | DF | 2017–2019 | 35 | 0 | 35 | 4 |
| Connor O'Toole | Australia | DF | 2017–2020 | 28 | 7 | 35 | 0 |
| Massimo Maccarone | Italy | FW | 2017–2018 | 29 | 1 | 30 | 10 |
| Rahmat Akbari | Australia | MF | 2017–2018; 2019–2023 | 65 | 26 | 91 | 3 |
| Fahid Ben Khalfallah | Tunisia | FW | 2017–2018 | 24 | 1 | 25 | 1 |
| Éric Bauthéac | France | MF | 2017–2019 | 45 | 2 | 47 | 10 |
| Álex López | Spain | MF | 2018–2019 | 25 | 0 | 25 | 3 |
| Dylan Wenzel-Halls | Australia | FW | 2018–2021 | 45 | 22 | 67 | 14 |
| Jordan Courtney-Perkins | Australia | DF | 2019–2023 | 31 | 11 | 42 | 1 |
| Macaulay Gillesphey | England | DF | 2019–2021 | 52 | 0 | 52 | 4 |
| Brad Inman | Australia | MF | 2019–2020 | 23 | 4 | 27 | 5 |
| Jesse Daley | Australia | FW | 2020–2022 | 26 | 28 | 54 | 0 |
| Riku Danzaki | Japan | MF | 2020–2021; 2022–2023 | 35 | 7 | 42 | 11 |
| **Alex Parsons** | Australia | FW | 2020–2022; 2023– | 18 | 31 | 49 | 6 |
| **Macklin Freke** | Australia | GK | 2021– | 64 | 2 | 66 | 0 |
| Josh Brindell-South | Australia | DF | 2021–2023 | 19 | 26 | 45 | 3 |
| Cyrus Dehmie | Australia | MF | 2021–2022 | 8 | 23 | 31 | 4 |
| **Antonee Burke-Gilroy** | Australia | DF | 2021; 2023– | 22 | 7 | 29 | 0 |
| Luke Ivanovic | Australia | FW | 2021–2022 | 10 | 16 | 26 | 7 |
| Nikola Mileusnic | Australia | MF | 2021–2024 | 57 | 17 | 74 | 14 |
| **Henry Hore** | Australia | FW | 2021– | 56 | 18 | 74 | 16 |
| **Jez Lofthouse** | Australia | FW | 2021– | 15 | 24 | 39 | 2 |
| **Louis Zabala** | Australia | MF | 2022– | 30 | 27 | 57 | 1 |
| Jordan Holmes | Australia | GK | 2022–2023 | 38 | 0 | 38 | 0 |
| Carlo Armiento | Australia | FW | 2022–2024 | 23 | 17 | 40 | 4 |
| Taras Gomulka | Australia | MF | 2023–2024 | 22 | 15 | 37 | 0 |
| **Thomas Waddingham** | Australia | FW | 2023– | 33 | 4 | 37 | 14 |
| **Florin Berenguer** | France | MF | 2023– | 21 | 8 | 29 | 3 |
