= Nathan Geyer =

Australian soccer player (born 2005)

Personal information
- Date of birth: 20 January 2005 (age 21)
- Place of birth: Gold Coast, Australia
- Height: 1.82 m (5 ft 11 1/2 in)
- Position: Right-back

Team information
- Current team: Brisbane Roar
- Number: 55

Youth career
- Across the Waves
- Palm Beach
- 2018–: Brisbane Roar

Senior career*
Years	Team	Apps	(Gls)
2022–	Brisbane Roar NPL	26	(1)
2023–	Brisbane Roar	0	(0)
- * Club domestic league appearances and goals as of 20 October 2023 ‡ National team caps and goals as of 25 September 2023

Nathan Geyer (born 20 January 2005) is an Australian footballer who plays as a right-back for Brisbane Roar.

== Club career ==
Geyer made his debut for Brisbane Roar in an Australia Cup clash against Newcastle Jets on 14 August 2023. He replaced Henry Hore in the 120th minute as the Roar advanced to the next round with a 3–2 win in extra time.
