= Rylan Brownlie =

Australian soccer player

Personal information
- Full name: Rylan Neal Brownlie
- Date of birth: 18 February 2007 (age 19)
- Place of birth: Brisbane, Queensland, Australia
- Height: 1.78 m (5 ft 10 in)
- Position: Striker

Team information
- Current team: Barnsley
- Number: 32

Youth career
- Moreton Bay United
- 2019–2022: Brisbane Roar
- 2023: Olympic FC
- 2023–2024: Brisbane Roar

Senior career*
Years	Team	Apps	(Gls)
2023	Olympic FC	8	(1)
2023–2024	Brisbane Roar NPL	19	(9)
2023–2024	Brisbane Roar	11	(1)
2025–2026	Crystal Palace	0	(0)
2026–	Barnsley	4	(0)

International career^{‡}
2025–	Australia U18	4	(1)
- * Club domestic league appearances and goals as of 16:37, 24 October 2026 (UTC) ‡ National team caps and goals as of 23:10, 8 October 2026 (UTC)

Rylan Neal Brownlie (born 18 February 2007) is an Australian professional soccer player who plays as a striker for EFL League One club Barnsley. The son of former professional soccer player Royce Brownlie, Brownlie has represented Australia at under-18 level, scoring one goal in four appearances.

== Early life ==
Brownlie was born 18 February 2007, his father being professional soccer player Royce Brownlie. When Brownlie joined the Brisbane Roar, he and his father became the first father-son duo to play for the club.

== Career ==
=== Brisbane Roar ===
For the first half of 2023, Brownlie played for Brisbane Roar II, where he made four appearances and scored one goal. He joined the main team in September 2023 and made his professional debut on 21 October 2023 in a 1–1 draw with Macarthur, replacing Henry Hore in the 64th minute.

In the 2023–24 A-League Men season, Brownlie scored one goal (against Melbourne City) and registered one assist (against Adelaide United).

=== Crystal Palace ===
On 7 March 2025, Brownlie signed for English Premier League club Crystal Palace. He played for the club's under-21 team, making eight appearances, including five in Premier League 2, before being released in 2026. He subsequently joined Barnsley in September 2026.

=== Barnsley ===
On 22 September 2026, Brownlie joined Barnsley on a permanent deal after impressing on trial, signing a professional contract with the League One club. He made his debut later that day, coming on as a half-time substitute in Barnsley's EFL Trophy match against Leeds United Under-21s.

== Youth international career ==
He was called up in May 2025 for the Australia men's national under-18 soccer team, to take part in the 2025 UEFA Friendship Cup commencing in early June.
