= Shae Cahill =

English footballer

Personal information
- Full name: Shae Lou Tim Cahill
- Date of birth: 26 April 2005 (age 21)
- Place of birth: Merseyside, England
- Position: Attacking midfielder

Youth career
- 2019–2023: Everton
- 2024–2026: Nottingham Forest

Senior career*
Years	Team	Apps	(Gls)
2023–2024	Brisbane Roar	2	(0)
2024	Brisbane Roar NPL	6	(1)
2024–2026	Nottingham Forest	0	(0)
- * Club domestic league appearances and goals as of 21 June 2024 ‡ National team caps and goals as of 20:56, 20 September 2023 (UTC)

Shae Lou Tim Cahill (born 26 April 2005) is a professional footballer who plays as an attacking midfielder. He is the son of former Australian footballer Tim Cahill.

== Early life ==
Shae Lou Tim Cahill was born on 26 April 2005 in Merseyside, England to Rebekah (née Greenhill) and professional footballer Tim Cahill. Both his parents were born in Sydney, Australia, although he is of Samoan descent through his father. He has an older brother, Kyah Cahill, and a younger sister, Sienna Cahill, as well as a younger brother, Cruz Cahill. Kyah is a Samoan youth international footballer, having played for Macclesfield Town and Spanish clubs Leganés and Rayo Vallecano. Both his uncles, Sean and Chris Cahill, also represented Samoa at international level. Sean later became a mechanic.

His family resided in Liverpool and moved to New York City, the United States in 2012 where he attended Northern Highlands Regional High School, located close to his home in Saddle River, New Jersey. His family also took residence at Lower Plenty, Victoria, Caringbah South, New South Wales and Horningsea Park, New South Wales in Australia. Cahill moved with his father to Hangzhou, China in 2015, but relocated to Melbourne eighteen months later after he told his father that China is "not the right move" for his football. At the age of 13, Cahill began training to become a professional footballer.

== Career ==
=== Youth career ===
Cahill began training at Finch Farm with the Everton Academy when he was 11 years old and officially joined in November 2019. He signed on a full-time contract in September 2021 after featuring in the under-18 squad, under manager Paul Tait, in the U18 Premier League. Cahill managed three assists in the 2022–23 season before being released at the end of his contract.

=== Brisbane Roar ===
On 19 September 2023, Cahill signed a multi-year contract with Brisbane Roar prior to the 2023–24 A-League Men season. Following his signing, head coach Ross Aloisi stated that Cahill was not signed due to his father but rather suited into the club's culture and future. Cahill's father posted on social media saying, "Very proud of you my man. Wishing you all the best, keep chasing your dreams." He made his unofficial debut in a friendly match against Newcastle Jets two days later but was not called up to the first-team until late-November. Cahill made his competitive debut as a substitute on 1 December 2023 in a 2–2 league draw against Western Sydney Wanderers at Suncorp Stadium. In June 2024, Cahill departed Brisbane Roar after nine months at the club via mutual termination.

== Career statistics ==
As of match played 29 December 2024

Appearances and goals by club, season and competition
Club	Season	League			Domestic Cup		League Cup		Other		Total	
Club	Season	Division	Apps	Goals	Apps	Goals	Apps	Goals	Apps	Goals	Apps	Goals
Brisbane Roar	2023–24	A-League	2	0	0	0	0	0	—		2	0
Nottingham Forest	2024–25	Premier League	0	0	0	0	0	0	—		0	0
Career totals			2	0	0	0	0	0	—		2	0
