= Anton Mlinaric =

Personal information
- Full name: Anton Mlinaric
- Date of birth: 11 March 2002 (age 24)
- Place of birth: Australia
- Height: 1.90 m (6 ft 3 in)
- Position: Central defender

Team information
- Current team: Marconi Stallions

Youth career
- St George FC
- 2016: Marconi Stallions
- 2017–2022: Sydney FC
- 2021: → Dinamo Zagreb (loan)

Senior career*
Years	Team	Apps	(Gls)
2019–2022	Sydney FC NPL	12	(0)
2021–2022	→ Brisbane Roar (loan)	11	(0)
2022	→ Brisbane Roar NPL (loan)	3	(0)
2022–2023	Brisbane Roar	11	(0)
2022–2023	Oakleigh Cannons	26	(2)
2024–	Marconi Stallions	55	(3)
- * Club domestic league appearances and goals as of 4 May 2026 ‡ National team caps and goals as of 19 November 2021

Anton Mlinaric is an Australian professional soccer player who plays as a central defender for Marconi Stallions in the NPL NSW.

== Career ==
=== Sydney FC ===
Milnaric came through the youth academy of Sydney FC and was identified as a highly talented defender from his performances in the National Premier Leagues NSW competition. Sydney allowed Milnaric to travel to Croatia where he had a successful trial with Dinamo Zagreb. Following his return to Sydney after being released from Dinamo Zagreb without securing a contract, Sydney agreed to loan him to Queensland A-League club Brisbane Roar in an effort to continue providing him with match time in a professional environment.

Following the end of his loan spell with Brisbane, his contract at Sydney was not renewed, and he would sign a full-time contract with Brisbane Roar.

=== Brisbane Roar ===
Mlinaric began his professional career with A-League club Brisbane Roar, making his debut in the 2021-22 season. Mlinaric made 14 appearances for the Roar in all competitions before he was released on a free transfer in the January transfer window the following season.

=== Oakleigh Cannons ===
Following his release from Brisbane, Milnaric moved to Victoria and signed with NPL Victoria club Oakleigh Cannons for the 2023 season.
