= James Nikolovski =

Australian soccer player

Personal information
- Date of birth: 5 April 2002 (age 24)
- Place of birth: Sydney, Australia
- Height: 1.83 m (6 ft 0 in)
- Position: Central defender

Team information
- Current team: Lions Gibraltar
- Number: 5

Youth career
- –2017: Sydney FC
- 2018: Rockdale Ilinden
- 2019–2020: Mt Druitt Town Rangers
- 2021: Rockdale Ilinden
- 2022–2024: Brisbane Roar

Senior career*
Years	Team	Apps	(Gls)
2020	Mt Druitt Town Rangers	1	(0)
2022–2024	Brisbane Roar NPL	23	(1)
2022–2024	Brisbane Roar	7	(0)
2024–2025	Olympic FC	10	(1)
2025–2026	Rockdale Ilinden	31	(3)
2026	Blacktown City	3	(0)
2026–	Lions Gibraltar	8	(0)
- * Club domestic league appearances and goals as of 8 November 2026 ‡ National team caps and goals as of 25 September 2023

James Nikolovski (born 2 April 2002) is an Australian footballer who plays as a central defender for Rockdale Ilinden in NPL NSW.

== Club career ==
=== Youth club ===
Nikolovski played youth football in New South Wales for Sydney FC, Rockdale Ilinden and Mt Druitt Town Rangers.

=== Brisbane Roar ===
Nikolovski joined Brisbane Roar in September 2022, initially playing for the youth academy that played in NPL Queensland. In February 2023, he signed his first professional contract alongside teammate Ayom Majok, who joined from Adelaide City. Nikolovski made his debut for Brisbane Roar in an Australia Cup clash against Newcastle Jets on 14 August 2023. He played 30 minutes after replacing Tom Aldred as the Roar advanced to the next round with a 3–2 win in extra time.

=== Olympic FC ===
Nikolovski join Olympic FC in NPL Queensland for the remainder of the 2024 season.
