= Jonas Markovski =

Australian soccer player

Personal information
- Full name: Jonas Markovski
- Date of birth: 17 March 1999 (age 27)
- Place of birth: Melbourne, Australia
- Height: 1.89 m (6 ft 2 1/2 in)
- Position: Striker

Team information
- Current team: Preston Lions
- Number: 10

Youth career
- 2014: South Melbourne
- 2015–2016: Hume City

Senior career*
Years	Team	Apps	(Gls)
2016	Hume City	1	(0)
2017	Box Hill United	4	(0)
2018	Preston Lions	3	(0)
2018–2019	Fawkner SC	24	(23)
2020	Lalor Sloga	0	(0)
2021–2023	Altona Magic	61	(26)
2023–2024	Brisbane Roar	16	(3)
2024–2025	FC Osaka	3	(0)
2025–	Preston Lions	40	(11)
- * Club domestic league appearances and goals as of 5 September 2026 ‡ National team caps and goals as of 25 September 2023

Jonas Markovski (Macedonian: Џонас Марковски; born 17 March 1999) is an Australian soccer player who plays as a striker for Preston Lions.

== Club career ==
=== Brisbane Roar ===
On 20 September 2023, after a golden-boot winning campaign in the NPL Victoria with Altona Magic, Markovski signed a one-year contract with Brisbane Roar. He made his debut in an Australia Cup semi-final clash against Melbourne Knights, replacing Thomas Waddingham in the 69th minute as the Roar advanced to the final after a 1–0 win.

On 14 January 2024, Markovski scored his first goal for the club in a 3–2 win over Newcastle Jets, coming on in the 71st minute and scoring Brisbane's 2nd goal to level the game. He then won a penalty in stoppage time which was converted by Jay O'Shea to give Brisbane their first win in 5 games.

=== FC Osaka ===
On 21 August 2024, it was announced that Markovski had signed for J3 League side FC Osaka.

=== Preston Lions ===
On 16 January 2025, Markovski return to Australia and signed for NPL Victoria club Preston Lions.

== Personal life ==
Markovski is the son of former Socceroo John Markovski, who coached him at Altona Magic in 2023.

== Honours ==
=== Individual ===
- NPL Victoria Golden Boot: 2023
- NPL Victoria Player's Player: 2023
