= Marcel Čanadi =

Austrian football player

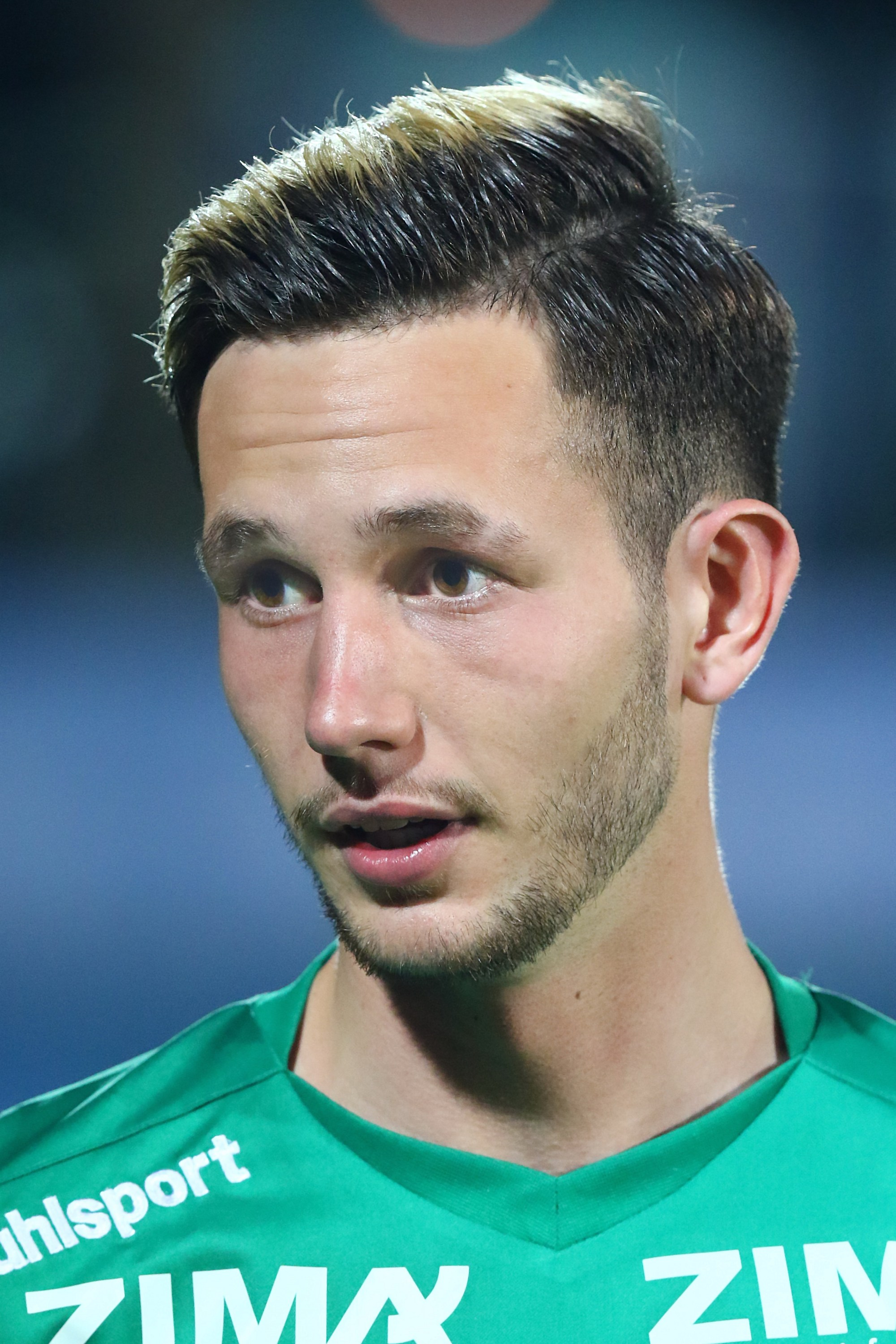

Personal information
- Date of birth: 27 October 1997 (age 29)
- Place of birth: Vienna, Austria
- Height: 1.84 m (6 ft 1/2 in)
- Position: Attacking midfielder

Team information
- Current team: Enosis Neon Paralimni
- Number: 11

Youth career
- 2004–2005: SV Essling
- 2005–2012: Austria Wien
- 2012–2014: AKA Vorarlberg
- 2014–2016: Borussia Mönchengladbach

Senior career*
Years	Team	Apps	(Gls)
2016–2017	Borussia Mönchengladbach II	2	(2)
2017–2020	Austria Lustenau	49	(8)
2020	Amstetten	12	(3)
2020–2022	SV Ried	20	(0)
2021	SV Ried II	1	(0)
2022–2023	Šibenik	10	(0)
2023	Brisbane Roar	4	(0)
2023	Hebar Pazardzhik	12	(0)
2024	Lexington SC	7	(0)
2025–	Enosis Neon Paralimni	14	(1)
- * Club domestic league appearances and goals as of 13 May 2025

Marcel Čanadi (born 27 October 1997) is an Austrian professional footballer who plays as a midfielder for Cypriot First Division club Enosis Neon Paralimni.

== Club career ==
He made his Austrian Football First League debut for SC Austria Lustenau on 8 September 2017 in a game against TSV Hartberg.

On 11 August 2020 he signed a two-year contract with SV Ried.

In August 2023, Čanadi joined Bulgarian First League club Hebar Pazardzhik.

On 12 September 2024, Čanadi joined USL League One club Lexington SC. He was released by Lexington following their 2024 season.

== Personal life ==
His father Damir Čanadi is a football manager and a former player.
