= Macklin Freke =

Australian soccer player

Personal information
- Full name: Macklin Lewis Freke
- Date of birth: 6 January 1999 (age 27)
- Place of birth: Ashgrove, Queensland, Australia
- Height: 1.93 m (6 ft 4 in)
- Position: Goalkeeper

Team information
- Current team: Melbourne City
- Number: 1

Youth career
- Brisbane City
- Brisbane Roar

Senior career*
Years	Team	Apps	(Gls)
2017–2022	Brisbane Roar NPL	46	(0)
2019–2026	Brisbane Roar	62	(0)
2026–	Melbourne City	0	(0)
- * Club domestic league appearances and goals as of 27 April 2024

Macklin Freke (/fɹiːk/; born 6 January 1999) is an Australian professional soccer player who plays as a goalkeeper for Melbourne City in the A-League Men. He previously played for Brisbane Roar.

== Career ==
=== Early life ===
Born in Brisbane, Queensland, Freke grew up playing cricket until stress fractures as a teenager resulted in him giving the game away, and taking up association football as a goalkeeper.

=== Brisbane Roar ===
Freke played state and NPL football for Brisbane City, before joining the Brisbane Roar's academy program. Signing a scholarship contract for the 2019–20 A-League Freke would make his debut for the senior men's side in the Round 21 fixture against Newcastle Jets.

== Career statistics ==
=== Club ===
As of match played 26 April 2024

Appearances and goals by club, season and competition
Club	Season	League			National Cup (Note: Includes the FFA Cup)		Asia		Other		Total	
Club	Season	Division	Apps	Goals	Apps	Goals	Apps	Goals	Apps	Goals	Apps	Goals
Brisbane Roar NPL	2019	NPL Queensland	13	0	–		–		–		13	0
Brisbane Roar NPL	2020	NPL Queensland	6	0	–		–		–		6	0
Brisbane Roar NPL	2021	NPL Queensland	3	0	–		–		–		3	0
Brisbane Roar NPL	Total		22	0	–		–		–		22	0
Brisbane Roar	2020–21	A-League	2	0	–		–		–		2	0
Brisbane Roar	2021–22	A-League	13	0	3	0	–		–		16	0
Brisbane Roar	2022–23	A-League	4	0	4	0	–		–		8	0
Brisbane Roar	2023–24	A-League	26	0	5	0	–		–		31	0
Brisbane Roar	Total		45	0	12	0	–		–		57	0
Career total			67	0	12	0	0	0	0	0	79	0

== Honours ==
Brisbane Roar

- A-League Youth Championship: 2019
