= Tom Aldred =

Scottish footballer (born 1990)

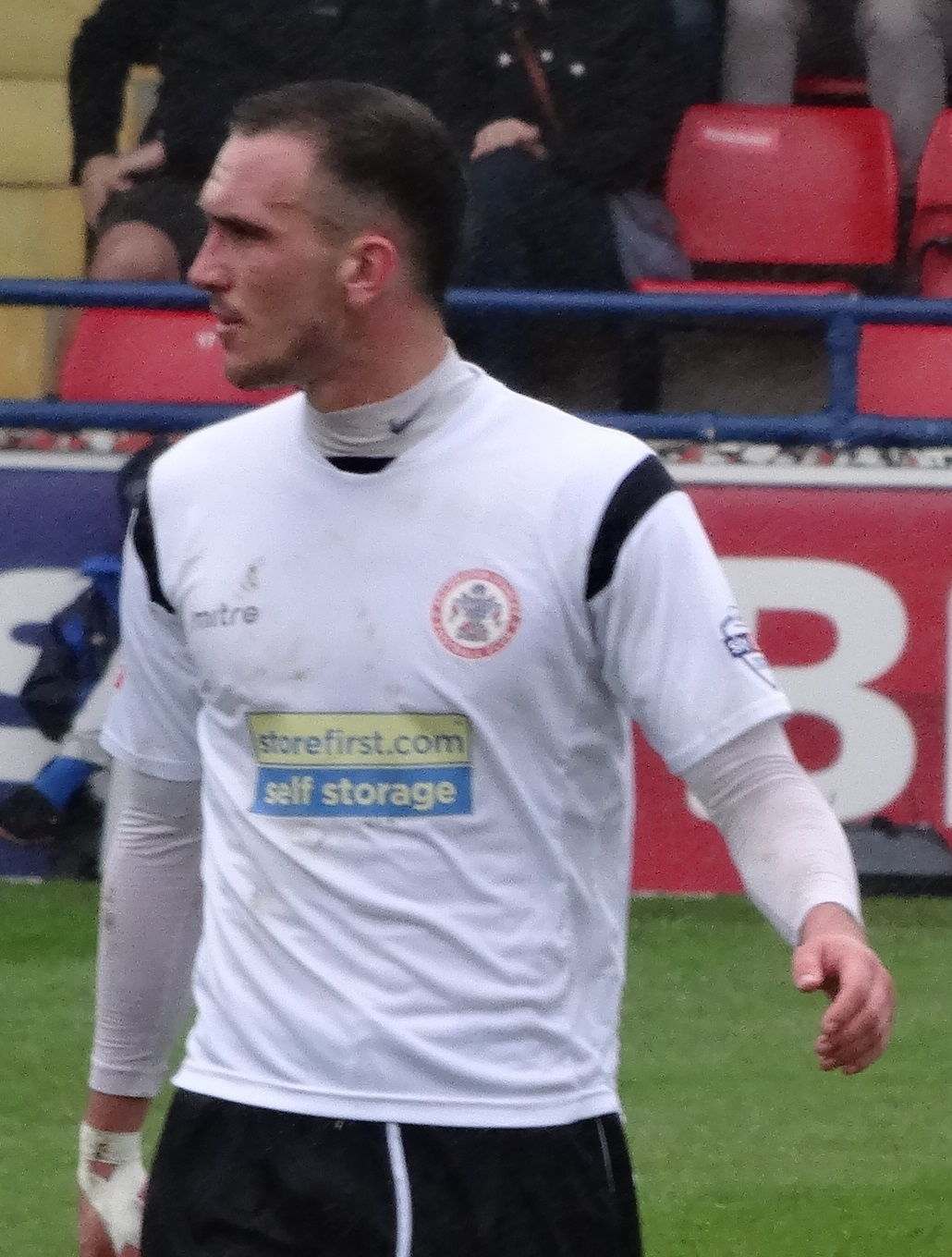
- Aldred with Accrington Stanley in 2014

Personal information
- Full name: Thomas Michael Aldred
- Date of birth: 11 September 1990 (age 36)
- Place of birth: Bolton, England
- Height: 1.88 m (6 ft 2 in)
- Position: Centre-back

Team information
- Current team: Brisbane Roar
- Number: 5

Youth career
- –2008: Carlisle United

Senior career*
Years	Team	Apps	(Gls)
2008–2010	Carlisle United	5	(0)
2009	→ Workington (loan)	10	(1)
2010–2011	Watford	0	(0)
2010–2011	→ Stockport County (loan)	7	(0)
2011	→ Inverness Caledonian Thistle (loan)	4	(0)
2011–2013	Colchester United	0	(0)
2011–2012	→ Torquay United (loan)	0	(0)
2012	→ Barrow (loan)	11	(0)
2013–2015	Accrington Stanley	84	(3)
2015	→ Blackpool (loan)	0	(0)
2015–2017	Blackpool	92	(7)
2017–2019	Bury	19	(1)
2018	→ Motherwell (loan)	17	(1)
2018–2019	→ Motherwell (loan)	37	(3)
2019–2024	Brisbane Roar	104	(3)
2024–2026	Mohun Bagan	38	(3)
2026–	Brisbane Roar	1	(0)

International career
2009	Scotland U19	1	(0)
- * Club domestic league appearances and goals as of 24 October 2026

Thomas Michael Aldred (born 11 September 1990) is a Scottish professional footballer who plays as a defender for A-League Men club Brisbane Roar. Born in England, he represented Scotland at under-19 level.

He began his career with Carlisle United in the Football League before joining Watford in 2010 and Colchester United in 2011. He failed to make a first-team appearance for either club, but made loan appearances for Stockport County, Inverness Caledonian Thistle and Barrow. Aldred joined Accrington Stanley in 2013 and then Blackpool two years later. He won promotion to League One with Blackpool in 2017 before joining Bury. In January 2018, he moved on loan to Motherwell, and then in August 2018, signed again on a season-long loan.

== Club career ==
=== Carlisle United ===
Born in Bolton, Greater Manchester, Aldred began his senior career with Carlisle United. He was captain of the Carlisle youth team and signed his first professional contract with the club in December 2008.

Aldred won the 2008–09 season League One Apprentice of the Year Award, before winning Carlisle's youth team Player of the Year award.

In August 2009, Aldred joined Workington on an initial month-long loan and earned rave reviews from the Conference North side's manager, Darren Edmondson, during a stay that was extended to the maximum three months following some excellent displays in the Cumbrian side's defence. He went on to make his first team debut for Carlisle as a late substitute in a 1–0 home win over Wycombe Wanderers on 12 December 2009.

In May 2010, following a promising campaign, Aldred was offered a one-year contract extension with Carlisle. However, he rejected the offer and left the club, having made five first-team appearances for Carlisle.

=== Watford ===
Aldred joined Championship club Watford on a two-year deal on 1 July 2010, with a compensation offer made to Carlisle. He felt that the move south would benefit his career.

Still yet to make an appearance for Watford, Aldred joined Stockport County on loan in November 2010 until January 2011. He made seven appearances for County.

On 21 June 2011, Aldred joined Scottish Premier League club Inverness Caledonian Thistle on a six-month loan deal. He made his debut in a 3–0 away defeat to Motherwell on 23 July, and made four appearances in total, his last a 2–0 defeat to Rangers where he conceded a penalty as his loan was cut short only one month into the spell.

On his return to Watford, Aldred was released from the club having not made a first team appearance on 31 August 2011. He later reflected his time at Watford, saying: "I made a mistake when I was 19. I broke into Carlisle United's first team, played five or six games, did really, really well and probably did too well. You know what it's like at that age, a young centre-half, people were looking at me with that kind of potential and Watford paid money for me. That was great at the time, but realistically, looking back now, I moved too soon and then as a knock-on effect, I kind of struggled to settle for like the next two years."

=== Colchester United ===
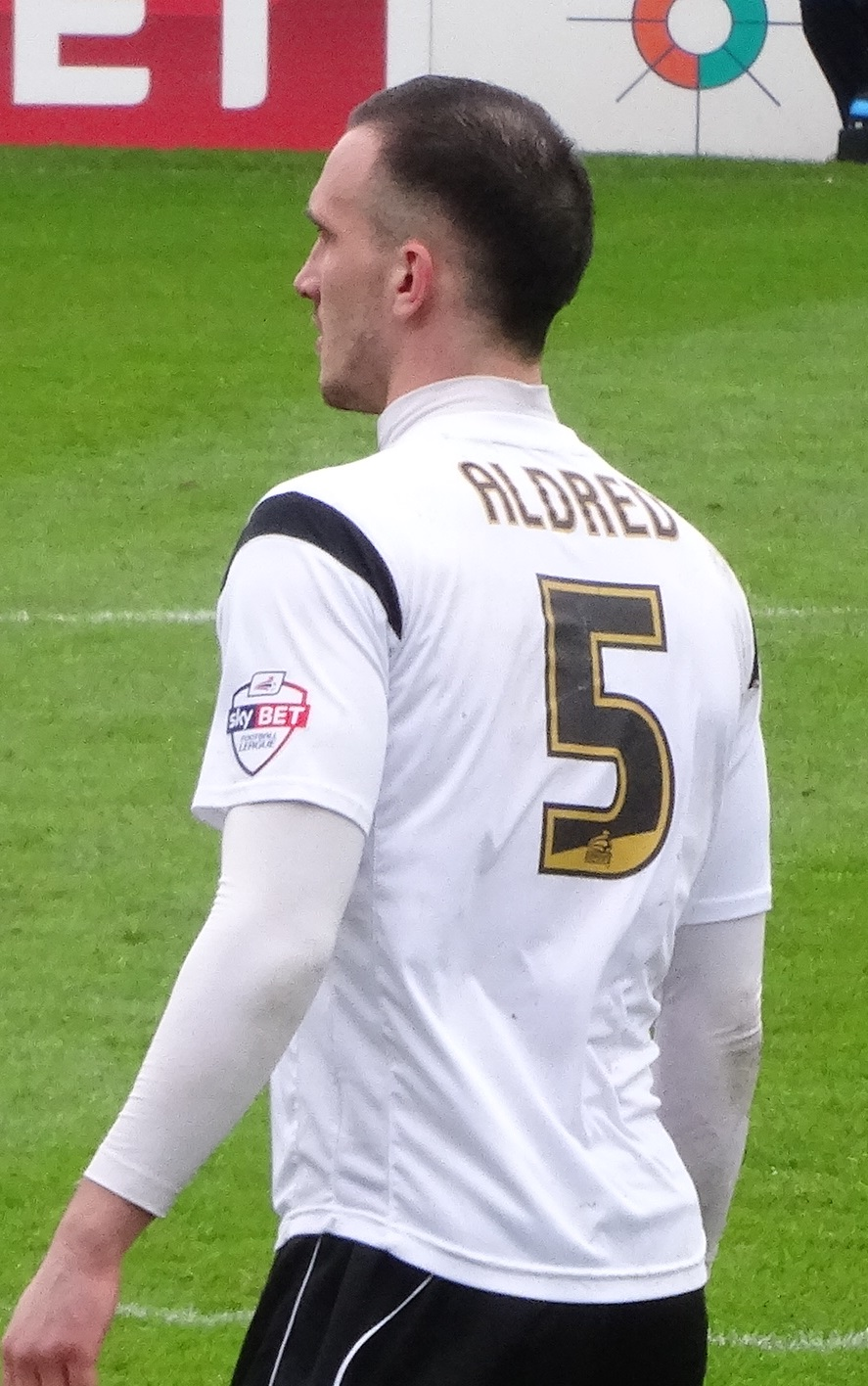
Aldred playing for Accrington Stanley in 2014

Colchester United manager John Ward signed Aldred on a two-year deal following his Watford release on 1 September 2011. Two months later, he was loaned to Torquay United from 24 November to 2 January as injury cover, although he failed to make an appearance for the Gulls.

Having failed to break into the Colchester first-team setup, Aldred joined Barrow on loan on 27 August 2012. He made his debut in a 2–0 defeat to Macclesfield Town. His loan was extended to the full 93 days allowed after he impressed during his initial month. Aldred completed his loan having made 13 appearances for Barrow.

After Colchester appointed Joe Dunne as manager, Aldred found himself further down the pecking order, and on 25 January 2013, the club announced that Aldred had been released from his contract.

=== Accrington Stanley ===
Following his release from Colchester, Aldred signed a contract until the end of the 2012–13 season with Accrington Stanley on 31 January 2013. He signed a new two-year contract with the club on 18 June having started the final 12 games of the 2012–13 season.

=== Blackpool ===
Aldred signed for Championship side Blackpool on a 28-day emergency loan on 31 January 2015, before signing permanently two days later on a one-and-a-half-year contract. Aldred helped Blackpool win promotion to League One in 2017.

=== Bury ===
Aldred signed for Bury in July 2017. He moved on loan to Scottish Premiership club Motherwell in January 2018. He made his debut for Motherwell on 20 January 2018, in a 2–0 win against Hamilton Academical in the Scottish Cup.

Aldred returned to Motherwell in August 2018, in a second loan deal with Bury. On 29 December 2018, he scored twice as Motherwell won 2–1 away to Hamilton Academical in the Lanarkshire derby.

=== Brisbane Roar ===
On 25 June 2019, Aldred signed for A-League club Brisbane Roar on a one-year deal. Ahead of the 2019–20 season, he was named club captain. Aldred's first goal for Brisbane Roar came against Adelaide United in February 2020. This goal came in the 74th minute and was the eventual winner in a 2–1 home victory. He left the club in 2024 to join Mohun Bagan but returned two years later to sign a one-year deal with the Roar.

== International career ==
Aldred represented Scotland at under-19 level, as he was eligible to play for the national side through his mother's side of the family.

== Personal life ==
In October 2023, Aldred said he announced his intentions to apply for an Australian citizenship, having settled in the country for four years. On 26 February 2024, it was announced that Aldred had successfully obtained Australian citizenship.

== Career statistics ==
As of match played 17 May 2026

Appearances and goals by club, season and competition
Club	Season	League			National cup (Note: Includes FA Cup, Scottish Cup, Australia Cup)		League cup (Note: Includes Football League Cup, Scottish League Cup, Durand Cup)		Continental		Other		Total	
Club	Season	Division	Apps	Goals	Apps	Goals	Apps	Goals	Apps	Goals	Apps	Goals	Apps	Goals
Carlisle United	2008–09	League One	0	0	0	0	0	0	—		0	0	0	0
Carlisle United	2009–10	League One	5	0	0	0	0	0	—		1 (Note: Appearance(s) in Football League Trophy)	0	6	0
Carlisle United	Total		5	0	0	0	0	0	0	0	1	0	6	0
Workington (loan)	2009–10	Conference North	10	1	2	0	—		—		1 (Note: Appearance in FA Trophy)	0	13	1
Watford	2010–11	Championship	0	0	0	0	0	0	—		—		0	0
Watford	2011–12	Championship	0	0	0	0	0	0	—		—		0	0
Watford	Total		0	0	0	0	0	0	0	0	0	0	0	0
Stockport County (loan)	2010–11	League Two	7	0	—		—		—		—		7	0
Inverness Caledonian Thistle (loan)	2011–12	Scottish Premier League	4	0	—		—		—		—		4	0
Colchester United	2011–12	League One	0	0	0	0	0	0	—		0	0	0	0
Colchester United	2012–13	League One	0	0	0	0	0	0	—		0	0	0	0
Colchester United	Total		0	0	0	0	0	0	0	0	0	0	0	0
Torquay United (loan)	2011–12	League Two	0	0	0	0	—		—		—		0	0
Barrow (loan)	2012–13	Conference Premier	11	0	1	0	—		—		1	0	13	0
Accrington Stanley	2012–13	League Two	13	0	—		—		—		—		13	0
Accrington Stanley	2013–14	League Two	46	2	1	0	2	0	—		1	0	50	2
Accrington Stanley	2014–15	League Two	25	1	4	1	1	0	—		1	0	31	2
Accrington Stanley	Total		84	3	5	1	3	0	0	0	2	0	94	4
Blackpool	2014–15	Championship	6	0	—		—		—		—		6	0
Blackpool	2015–16	League One	42	5	1	0	1	0	—		1	0	45	5
Blackpool	2016–17	League Two	44	2	4	0	1	0	—		3 (Note: Appearances in EFL League Two play-offs)	0	52	2
Blackpool	Total		92	7	5	0	2	0	0	0	4	0	103	7
Bury	2017–18	League One	19	1	2	0	1	0	—		1 (Note: Appearance in EFL Trophy)	0	23	1
Bury	2018–19	League Two	0	0	0	0	0	0	—		0	0	0	0
Bury	Total		19	1	2	0	1	0	0	0	1	0	23	1
Motherwell (loan)	2017–18	Scottish Premiership	17	1	5	0	—		—		—		22	1
Motherwell (loan)	2018–19	Scottish Premiership	37	3	1	0	2	0	—		—		40	3
Motherwell (loan)	Total		54	4	6	0	2	0	0	0	0	0	62	4
Brisbane Roar	2019–20	A-League	26	1	2	0	—		—		—		28	1
Brisbane Roar	2020–21	A-League	17	0	—		—		—		—		17	0
Brisbane Roar	2021–22	A-League	12	0	2	0	—		—		—		14	0
Brisbane Roar	2022–23	A-League	24	1	2	0	—		—		—		26	1
Brisbane Roar	2023–24	A-League	25	1	5	0	—		—		—		30	1
Brisbane Roar	Total		104	3	11	0	0	0	0	0	0	0	115	3
Mohun Bagan	2024–25	Indian Super League	26	2	0	0	5	1	1 (Note: Appearance in AFC Champions League Two)	0	—		32	3
Mohun Bagan	2025–26	Indian Super League	12	1	3 (Note: Appearance(s) in AIFF Super Cup)	0	3	0	1	0	3 (Note: Appearance(s) in IFA Shield)	0	22	1
Mohun Bagan	Total		38	3	3	0	8	1	2	0	3	0	54	4
Career total			428	21	35	1	16	1	2	0	13	0	494	23

== Honours ==
Blackpool

- EFL League Two play-offs: 2017

Mohun Bagan

- Indian Super League Shield: 2024–25
- Indian Super League Cup: 2024–25
- IFA Shield: 2025
- Durand Cup runner-up: 2024

Individual

- Accrington Stanley Player of the Season: 2013–14
- Blackpool Player of the Season: 2016–17
- Brisbane Roar Player of the Season: 2022–23
