= Ayom Majok =

South Sudanese footballer

Personal information
- Full name: Ayom Majok Ayom
- Date of birth: 1 January 2003 (age 23)
- Place of birth: Juba, Sudan
- Height: 1.82 m (6 ft 0 in)
- Position: Forward

Team information
- Current team: Marsaxlokk
- Number: 99

Youth career
- West Adelaide

Senior career*
Years	Team	Apps	(Gls)
2019	Adelaide United NPL	1	(0)
2020	Cumberland United	21	(9)
2020–2022	Western United	1	(0)
2021–2022	Western United NPL	10	(4)
2022–2023	Adelaide City	18	(8)
2023–2024	Brisbane Roar	13	(1)
2023–2024	Brisbane Roar NPL	19	(5)
2024–2025	Persita Tangerang	9	(0)
2025–	Marsaxlokk	7	(2)
- * Club domestic league appearances and goals as of 6 October 2025

Ayom Majok Ayom (born 1 January 2003) is a South Sudanese professional footballer who plays as a forward for Maltese Premier League club Marsaxlokk.

== Club career ==
Majok played youth football for West Adelaide after impressing them at school trials. He later joined Adelaide United's NPL squad, but didn't play for long and quit. He then restarted his career at Cumberland United, first as a reserves player before gaining a chance in the first team, for whom he scored 9 goals in 21 games.

In December 2020, Majok joined professional A-League Men club Western United on a two-year scholarship contract. He and the club mutually terminated his contract in February 2022 after he played only one A-League game. He moved to Adelaide City in April 2022.

Following his contribution in Adelaide City's 2022 season which saw them win the premiership and championship in NPL South Australia, Brisbane Roar signed Majok on a youth development agreement. Majok made his senior debut for the Brisbane Roar as a substitute in the 78th minute, replacing Joseph Knowles, in a game against Melbourne City which ended in a 0–0 draw.

On 21 December 2024, Majok signed with Persita Tangerang of Indonesia's Liga 1. On 6 June 2025, Majok officially left Persita Tangerang.
