= Joe Caletti =

Australian soccer player

Joe Caletti 加藤 カレッティ 丈
Personal information
- Full name: Joe Kato Caletti
- Date of birth: 14 September 1998 (age 28)
- Place of birth: Kuala Lumpur, Malaysia
- Height: 1.62 m (5 ft 4 in)
- Position: Central midfielder

Team information
- Current team: Tochigi City
- Number: 6

Youth career
- 2013: FNSW NTC
- 2016–2017: Brisbane Roar

Senior career*
Years	Team	Apps	(Gls)
2014–2015	FFA COE	28	(0)
2016–2018	Brisbane Roar NPL	7	(0)
2016–2019	Brisbane Roar	31	(0)
2019–2020	Florø	11	(1)
2020–2022	Adelaide United	32	(0)
2022–2023	Tochigi City	20	(5)
2023–2025	Brisbane Roar	19	(0)
2025–	Tochigi City	38	(0)

International career^{‡}
2015–2016	Australia U17	19	(2)
2017	Australia U23	2	(0)
Medal record
Men's football
Representing Australia
AFF U-16 Youth Championship
Third place	2013 Myanmar	U-17 Team
- * Club domestic league appearances and goals as of 16 August 2026 ‡ National team caps and goals as of 23 July 2017

Joe Kato Caletti (加藤 カレッティ 丈, Katō Karetti Jō, born 14 September 1998) is a professional soccer player who plays as a central midfielder and currently plays for J2 League club Tochigi City. Born in Malaysia, he represented Australia at youth level.

== Club career ==
Caletti joined Brisbane Roar in January 2016 after previously playing for the FFA Centre of Excellence, where he was named Player of the Season twice. At the age of 18, he debuted for Brisbane Roar. In mid 2019, Caletti was released by Brisbane Roar and was without club for a few months before signing for 3rd tier club Florø in Norway.

On 25 July 2022, Caletti signed for Kantō Soccer League club Tochigi City from Adelaide United.

In August 2023, Caletti returned to Australia, re-joining Brisbane Roar. In January 2025, Caletti had his contract mutually terminated to allow him to pursue an opportunity overseas. Caletti then rejoined his former club Tochigi City who have since been promoted to the J3 League.

== International career ==
Caletti was part of the Australia national under-17 football team, captained the team at the 2015 FIFA U-17 World Cup in Chile.

== Personal life ==
Caletti was born in Malaysia. He has played in Australia, Norway and Japan.

== Playing style ==
Caletti is widely accredited for his high work rate and willingness to compete in the midfield despite his small stature. His composure on the ball and ability to execute crucial passes has led to comparisons with former Brisbane Roar player Massimo Murdocca.

== Honours ==
Tochigi City

- J3 League: 2025
