= Henry Hore =

Australian soccer player

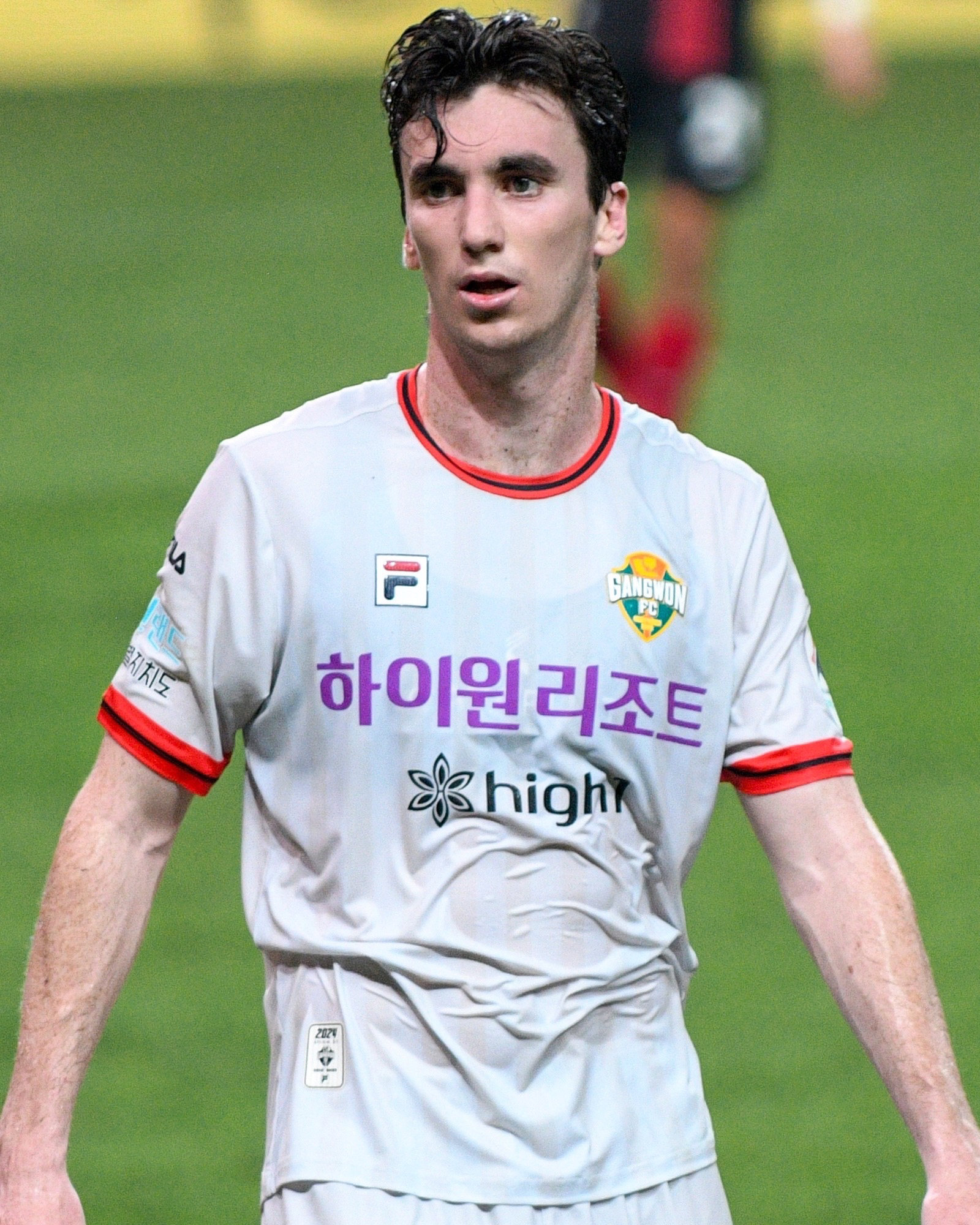
- Hore in 2024

Personal information
- Date of birth: 17 August 1999 (age 27)
- Place of birth: Nambour, Australia
- Height: 1.80 m (5 ft 11 in)
- Position: Attacking midfielder

Team information
- Current team: Perth Glory
- Number: 13

Youth career
- Sunshine Coast
- Brisbane Roar
- 2017–2019: Perth Glory

Senior career*
Years	Team	Apps	(Gls)
2018–2019	Perth Glory NPL	38	(11)
2019–2020	Lions FC	36	(16)
2021	South Melbourne	18	(1)
2021–2026	Brisbane Roar	94	(17)
2024	→ Gangwon FC (loan)	10	(1)
2026–	Perth Glory	0	(0)
- * Club domestic league appearances and goals as of 18 April 2026

Henry Hore (born 17 August 1999), is an Australian professional soccer player who plays as an attacking midfielder for Perth Glory. He attended Brisbane Boys' College.

His older brother Mitchell is also a footballer, currently playing at Henry's former club Lions FC. The brothers played against each other when Lions hosted Perth in an Australia Cup tie in 2026.

== Career statistics ==
As of match played 28 October 2023

Appearances and goals by club, season and competition
Club	Season	League			National cup		Other		Total	
Club	Season	Division	Apps	Goals	Apps	Goals	Apps	Goals	Apps	Goals
Queensland Lions	2019	National Premier Leagues	10	7	0	0	2 (Note: Appearances in the 2019 Final Series)	0	12	7
Queensland Lions	2020	National Premier Leagues	26	9	0	0	—		26	9
Queensland Lions	Total		36	16	0	0	2	0	38	16
South Melbourne	2021	Football Victoria	18	1	0	0	—		18	1
Brisbane Roar	2021–22	A-League Men	23	5	0	0	—		23	5
Brisbane Roar	2022–23	A-League Men	23	2	4	2	—		27	4
Brisbane Roar	2023–24	A-League Men	2	2	4	2	—		6	4
Brisbane Roar	Total		48	9	8	4	0	0	56	13
Career total			102	26	5	2	2	0	109	28
