= Louis Zabala =

Australian soccer player

Personal information
- Full name: Louis Zabala
- Date of birth: 25 January 2001 (age 25)
- Place of birth: Giru, Queensland, Australia
- Height: 1.80 m (5 ft 11 in)
- Position: Midfielder

Team information
- Current team: Boeung Ket
- Number: 13

Youth career
- 2006–2011: Burdekin FC
- 2011–2014: Estates FC
- 2014–2016: Townsville Warriors FC
- 2017–2019: Sutherland Sharks
- 2020–2025: Brisbane Roar

Senior career*
Years	Team	Apps	(Gls)
2020–2024	Brisbane Roar NPL	41	(5)
2022–2025	Brisbane Roar	62	(0)
2025–	Boeung Ket	33	(3)
- * Club domestic league appearances and goals as of 9 November 2026 ‡ National team caps and goals as of 12 January 2022

Louis Zabala (born 25 January 2001) is an Australian professional soccer player who plays as a midfielder for Boeung Ket.

== Early life ==
Zabala was born in Giru, Queensland. His family lived on a farm until he moved to Townsville at the age of ten. Zabala began playing football at the age of five, and spent time at Burdekin FC and Townsville Warriors. At the age of 15, he relocated to Sydney after being accepted at Westfields Sports High School, where he completed his high school education. His mother moved to Sydney with him, while his father remained in Giru. Zabala later returned to Queensland in 2020 after a stint in Spain.
