= Thomas Waddingham =

Australian soccer player (born 2005)

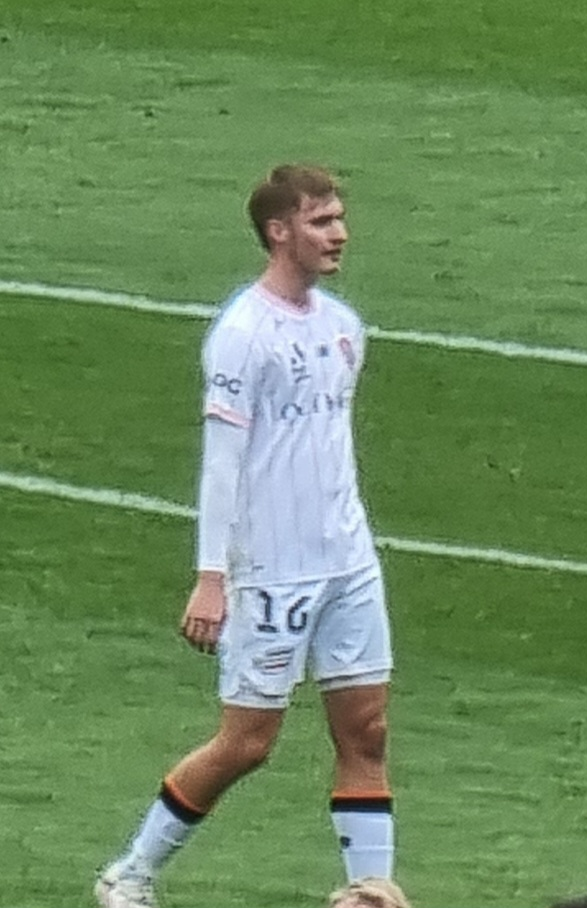
- Waddingham playing for Brisbane Roar in 2024

Personal information
- Full name: Thomas Anthony Waddingham
- Date of birth: 5 April 2005 (age 21)
- Place of birth: Cairns, Australia
- Height: 1.81 m (5 ft 11 in)
- Position: Striker

Team information
- Current team: Portsmouth
- Number: 20

Youth career
- Edge Hill United
- 2021–2023: Brisbane Roar

Senior career*
Years	Team	Apps	(Gls)
2022–2024	Brisbane Roar NPL	29	(12)
2023–2025	Brisbane Roar	34	(11)
2025–	Portsmouth	15	(3)

International career^{‡}
2023–	Australia U20	8	(2)
2024–	Australia U23	1	(0)
Medal record
Men's football
Representing Australia
WAFF U-23 Championship
Runner-up	2024 Saudi Arabia
- * Club domestic league appearances and goals as of 15:09, 7 November 2026 (UTC) ‡ National team caps and goals as of 30 September 2024

Thomas Anthony Waddingham (born 5 April 2005) is an Australian soccer player who plays as a striker for EFL Championship club Portsmouth.

== Club career ==
=== Brisbane Roar ===
Raised in Cairns, Waddingham is a graduate of Kelvin Grove State College, and is of English descent. He began his football career at Edge Hill United before signing for Brisbane Roar Academy in 2021. During that time, he briefly trialled at English club Blackpool for a place in their youth academy.

Waddingham made his debut for Brisbane Roar in an Australia Cup clash against the Newcastle Jets on 14 August 2023.

=== Portsmouth ===
On 22 January 2025, Waddingham joined EFL Championship side Portsmouth for an undisclosed fee, on a three-and-a-half-year deal. He made his debut three days later as a second-half substitute, scoring a consolation goal in a 5–1 defeat to West Bromwich Albion.

== International career ==
Waddingham was called up to the Australian national team for the first time in November 2026 for friendly internationals against Qatar and Jordan.

== Career statistics ==
As of 7 November 2026

Appearances and goals by club, season and competition
Club	Season	League			National cup (Note: Includes Australia Cup, FA Cup)		League cup (Note: Includes EFL Cup)		Other		Total	
Club	Season	Division	Apps	Goals	Apps	Goals	Apps	Goals	Apps	Goals	Apps	Goals
Brisbane Roar	2023–24	A-League Men	23	7	5	4	—		—		28	11
Brisbane Roar	2024–25	A-League Men	11	4	1	0	—		—		12	4
Brisbane Roar	Total		34	11	6	4	0	0	0	0	40	15
Portsmouth	2024–25	Championship	5	1	—		—		—		5	1
Portsmouth	2025–26	Championship	6	0	0	0	1	0	—		7	0
Portsmouth	2026–27	Championship	4	2	0	0	1	0	—		5	2
Portsmouth	Total		15	3	6	0	2	0	0	0	17	3
Career total			49	14	6	4	1	0	0	0	57	18

== Honours ==
Australia U-23

- WAFF U-23 Championship: runner-up 2024
