= 2026–27 Brisbane Roar FC season =

Brisbane Roar
2026–27 season
- Owner: Bakrie Group
- Chairman: Kaz Patafta
- Head Coach: Michael Valkanis
- Stadium: Suncorp Stadium; Dolphin Stadium (select matches)
- A-League Men: 4th
- A-League Men Finals: DNQ
- Australia Cup: Round of 16
- Top goalscorer: League: Justin Vidic (2 goals); All: Justin Vidic (3 goals)
- Highest home attendance: 6,497 vs. Perth Glory (3O 0ctober 2026); A-League Men
- Lowest home attendance: 6,384 vs. Sydney FC (21 November 2026); A-League Men
- Average home league attendance: 6,441
- Biggest win: 3–0 vs. Sydney Olympic (A) (30 July 2026); Australia Cup
Home colours	Away colours	Third colours
- All statistics correct as of 22 November 2026.

The 2026–27 season is Brisbane Roar Football Club's 22nd season in the A-League Men. In addition to the domestic league, Brisbane Roar also participated in this season's edition of the 2026 Australia Cup.

== Players ==
Note: Flags indicate national team as defined under FIFA eligibility rules; some limited exceptions apply. Players may hold more than one non-FIFA nationality.

No.	Pos.	Nation	Player
1	GK	AUS	Dean Bouzanis
2	DF	AUS	Jacob Nasso
3	DF	AUS	Dimitri Valkanis
5	DF	SCO	Tom Aldred (captain)
6	MF	AUS	Noah Maieroni (scholarship)
8	MF	AUS	Tyrese Francois
9	FW	MDA	Virgiliu Postolachi
10	MF	KOR	Nam Tae-hee
11	FW	GER	Marko Ilic
13	DF	AUS	Tate Russell
14	MF	AUS	Emin Durakovic
15	DF	AUS	Hosine Bility
16	DF	AUS	Joel King

No.	Pos.	Nation	Player
17	FW	AUS	Justin Vidic
19	FW	AUS	Sabit Ngor
21	MF	AUS	Max Court (scholarship)
22	FW	AUS	Nathan Amanatidis
23	GK	AUS	Oscar Page (scholarship)
38	MF	AUS	Taj Sorensen (scholarship)
39	FW	AUS	Niall Thom (scholarship)
40	GK	AUS	George Plusnin (scholarship)
41	MF	AUS	Emmett Shaw (scholarship)
44	MF	AUS	Jordan Lauton
53	DF	AUS	Archie Mitchell (scholarship)
77	MF	BIH	Milorad Stajić

== Transfers and contracts ==
=== Transfers in ===
No.	Position	Name	From	Type/fee	Contract length	Date	Ref.
11	FW	(Germany) Marko Ilic	(Germany) TSV Havelse	Free transfer	2 years	1 July 2026	
19	FW	Sabit Ngor	Central Coast Mariners	Free transfer	2 years	1 July 2026	
16	DF	Joel King	Sydney FC	Free transfer	2 years	1 July 2026	
13	DF	Tate Russell	(Australia) Wollongong Wolves	Free transfer	2 years	1 July 2026	
2	DF	Jacob Nasso	Central Coast Mariners Academy	Free transfer	3 years	1 July 2026	
14	MF	Emin Durakovic	Melbourne City	Free transfer	2 years	1 July 2026	
3	DF	Dimitri Valkanis	(Greece) AEK Athens	Free transfer	3 years	1 July 2026	
10	MF	(South Korea) Nam Tae-hee	(South Korea) Jeju SK	Free transfer	2 years	25 July 2026	
5	DF	(Scotland) Tom Aldred	Unattached	Free transfer	1 year	6 August 2026	
9	FW	(Moldova) Virgiliu Postolachi	(Romania) Universitatea Cluj	Free transfer	2 years	24 August 2026	
8	MF	Tyrese Francois	Unattached	Free transfer	Multi-year	28 August 2026	
21	MF	Max Court	(Australia) APIA Leichhardt	Free transfer	3 year scholarship	1 September 2026	

==== From youth squad ====
N	Pos.	Nat.	Name	Age	Notes
23	GK	(Australia)	Oscar Page	19	3-year scholarship contract
40	GK	(Australia)	George Plusnin	18	4-year scholarship contract
53	DF	(Australia)	Archie Mitchell	17	4-year scholarship contract
41	MF	(Australia)	Emmett Shaw	17	3-year scholarship contract
38	MF	(Australia)	Taj Sorensen	17	Multi-year scholarship contract
39	FW	(Australia)	Niall Thom	20	Multi-year scholarship contract

=== Transfers out ===
No.	Position	Name	To	Type/fee	Date	Ref.
10	MF	(Greece) Georgios Vrakas	Unattached	Mutual contract termination	8 May 2026	
23	DF	(New Zealand) James McGarry	Wellington Phoenix	Mutual contract termination	9 June 2026	
3	DF	Dimitri Valkanis	(Greece) AEK Athens	End of loan	30 June 2026	
4	DF	Ben Warland	(Australia) Olympic FC	End of contract	27 June 2026	
21	DF	Antonee Burke-Gilroy	(Australia) Preston Lions	End of contract	27 June 2026	
2	DF	(Costa Rica) Youstin Salas	(Costa Rica) Sporting San José	End of loan	30 June 2026	
5	DF	(Norway) Marius Lode	(Sweden) BK Häcken	End of loan	30 June 2026	
6	DF	Austin Ludwik	(Australia) Gold Coast Knights	End of contract	30 June 2026	
7	FW	Jacob Brazete	Unattached	End of contract	30 June 2026	
8	MF	Sam Klein	(Germany) St. Pauli	Undisclosed	30 June 2026	
9	FW	(England) Chris Long	Unattached	End of contract	30 June 2026	
11	GK	Macklin Freke	Unattached	End of contract	30 June 2026	
13	FW	Henry Hore	Perth Glory	End of contract	30 June 2026	
16	DF	Matthew Dench	Perth Glory	End of contract	30 June 2026	
19	FW	Michael Ruhs	Unattached	End of contract	30 June 2026	
25	FW	Nicholas D'Agostino	(Norway) Viking	End of loan	30 June 2026	
26	MF	(Republic of Ireland) Jay O'Shea	Unattached	End of contract	30 June 2026	
27	FW	Ben Halloran	Unattached	End of contract	30 June 2026	
30	MF	Quinn MacNicol	Melbourne City	End of contract	30 June 2026	

=== Contract extensions ===
No.	Name	Position	Duration	Date	Notes
6	Noah Maieroni	Defensive midfielder	3 years	25 June 2026	Contract extended from end of 2026–27 season to end of 2029–30 season

== Pre-season and friendlies ==
15 July 2026	Caboolture (Australia)	0–3	(Australia) Brisbane Roar	Burpengary, Australia
19:30 AEST		Report	Vidic 26', 45+1'; Abdulkarim 77'	Stadium: Moreton Bay Central Sports Complex

22 July 2026	Ipswich FC (Australia)	0–5	(Australia) Brisbane Roar	Ipswich, Australia
19:30 AEST		Report	Ngor; King; Thom; Harrison; Sorensen	Stadium: Briggs Road Sporting Complex

27 August 2026 Indonesia Tour	Dewa United (Indonesia)	4–0	(Australia) Brisbane Roar	Serang, Indonesia
15:30 WIB	Rafael 2'; Iury 35'; Marukawa 61'; Egy 83'	Report		Stadium: Banten International Stadium; Attendance: 0 (behind closed doors)

29 August 2026 Indonesia Tour	Persija Jakarta (Indonesia)	4–0	(Australia) Brisbane Roar	Jakarta, Indonesia
20:00 WIB	Jeremejeff 15' (pen.), 56'; Memija 48'; Bouzanis 90+3' (o.g.)	Report		Stadium: Jakarta International Stadium; Attendance: 10,000+

4 September 2026	Olympic FC (Australia)	3–4	(Australia) Brisbane Roar	Brisbane, Australia
18:30 AEST	Goal	Report	Russell; Aldred; Lauton; Vidic	Stadium: Goodwin Park

19 September 2026 Mitre Festival of Football	Queensland XI (Australia)	1–3	(Australia) Brisbane Roar	Brisbane, Australia
18:00 AEST	Inman 54'	Report	Shaw 5', 11'; Vidic (pen.)	Stadium: Gioca Stadium; Attendance: 1,500+

26 September 2026 Mitre Festival of Football	Queensland XI (Australia)	3–6	(Australia) Brisbane Roar	Kippa-Ring, Australia
18:30 AEST	Walters 23' (pen.), 88'; Inman 56'	Report	Vidic 41', 74'; Nam 61'; Aldred 63'; Deng 66'; Lauton 83'	Stadium: A.J. Kelly Park

11 October 2026	Brisbane Roar (Australia)	3–1	(Australia) Broadmeadow Magic	Lismore, Australia
12:30 AEDT	Aldred; Vidic	Report	Goal	Stadium: Crozier Field

== Competitions ==
=== Overall record ===
Competition	First match	Last match	Starting round	Final position	Record							
Competition	First match	Last match	Starting round	Final position	Pld	W	D	L	GF	GA	GD	Win %
A-League Men	23 October 2026	9 May 2027	Matchday 1		4	2	2	0	5	3	+2	50.00
2026 Australia Cup	30 July 2026	9 August 2026	Round of 32	Round of 16	2	1	0	1	5	4	+1	50.00
Total					6	3	2	1	10	7	+3	50.00

Last updated: 21 November 2026
Source: Competitions

=== A-League Men ===
==== League table ====
Pos	Team	Pld	W	D	L	GF	GA	GD	Pts	Qualification
2	Western Sydney Wanderers	5	2	2	1	10	6	+4	8	Qualification for the AFC Champions League Elite league stage and the finals series (Note: The top two teams enter the finals series at the semi-finals, while the teams ranked third to sixth enter the finals series at the elimination-finals.)
3	Sydney FC	5	2	2	1	7	4	+3	8	Qualification for the AFC Champions League Elite preliminary stage and the finals series
4	Brisbane Roar	4	2	2	0	5	3	+2	8	Qualification for the finals series
5	Macarthur FC	5	2	2	1	6	5	+1	8	Qualification for the finals series
6	Perth Glory	5	2	1	2	8	5	+3	7	Qualification for the finals series

Updated to match(es) played on 22 November 2026. Source: A-Leagues
Rules for classification: 1) points; 2) goal difference; 3) goals scored; 4) wins; 5) head-to-head results; 5a) head-to-head points; 5b) head-to-head goal difference; 6) Fair Play points; 7) away goal difference; 8) away goals per match; 9) home goal difference; 10) home goals per match; 11) toss of a coin in an event of a tie of two clubs.

==== Results summary ====
Overall								Home						Away					
Pld	W	D	L	GF	GA	GD	Pts	W	D	L	GF	GA	GD	W	D	L	GF	GA	GD
4	2	2	0	5	3	+2	8	1	2	0	3	2	+1	1	0	0	2	1	+1

Last updated: 21 November 2026.
Source: Ultimate A-League

==== Results by round ====
Round	2	3	4	5
Ground	H	H	A	H
Result	W	D	W	D
Position	5	4	3	4
Points	3	4	7	8

Updated to match(es) played on 21 November 2026. Source: Ultimate A-League
A = Away; H = Home; W = Win; D = Draw; L = Loss

==== Matches ====
Win Draw Loss Fixtures

23 October 2026 2	Brisbane Roar	2–1	Perth Glory	Brisbane
19:00 AEST	Vidic 28'; Nam 42'	Report	Ellis 60'	Stadium: Suncorp Stadium; Attendance: 6,497; Referee: Alireza Faghani

30 October 2026 3	Brisbane Roar	1–1	Auckland FC	Brisbane
18:00 AEST	Aldred 90+5'	Report	Sakai 11'	Stadium: Suncorp Stadium; Attendance: 7,284; Referee: Lachlan Keevers

8 November 2026 4	Macarthur FC	1–2	Brisbane Roar	Sydney
15:00 AEDT	Stamatelopoulos 64'	Report	Ngor 48'; Vidic 90+5'	Stadium: Campbelltown Sports Stadium; Attendance: 3,568; Referee: Adam Kersey

21 November 2026 5	Brisbane Roar	0–0	Sydney FC	Brisbane
18:40 AEST		Report		Stadium: Kayo Stadium; Attendance: 6,384; Referee: Daniel Elder

12 December 2026 8	Central Coast Mariners	v	Brisbane Roar	Gosford
17:00 AEDT		Report		Stadium: Polytec Stadium

15 December 2026 1	Adelaide United	v	Brisbane Roar	Adelaide
19:10 ACDT		Source		Stadium: Coopers Stadium
Note: Originally scheduled for 18 October 2026.

19 December 2026 9	Brisbane Roar	v	Western Sydney Wanderers	Brisbane
16:00 AEST		Source		Stadium: Kayo Stadium

30 December 2026 10	Brisbane Roar	v	Perth Glory	Brisbane
17:40 AEST		Report		Stadium: Kayo Stadium

2 January 2027 11	Sydney FC	v	Brisbane Roar	Sydney
19:40 AEDT		Report		Stadium: Allianz Stadium

9 January 2027 12	Brisbane Roar	v	Melbourne Victory	Brisbane
18:00 AEST				Stadium: Kayo Stadium

16 January 2027 13	Melbourne City	v	Brisbane Roar	Melbourne
17:00 AEST		Report		Stadium: AAMI Park

23 January 2027 14	Brisbane Roar	v	Wellington Phoenix	Brisbane
16:00 AEST				Stadium: Kayo Stadium

31 January 2027 15	Auckland FC	v	Brisbane Roar	Auckland
15:00 NZDT		Report		Stadium: Go Media Stadium

7 February 2027 16	Brisbane Roar	v	Central Coast Mariners	Brisbane
17:00 AEST		Report		Stadium: Kayo Stadium

13 February 2027 17	Newcastle Jets	v	Brisbane Roar	Newcastle
17:00 AEDT		Report		Stadium: McDonald Jones Stadium

19 February 2027 18	Brisbane Roar	v	Macarthur FC	Brisbane
17:00 AEST		Report		Stadium: Suncorp Stadium

27 February 2027 19	Perth Glory	v	Brisbane Roar	Perth
18:45 AWST		Report		Stadium: HBF Park

7 March 2027 20	Western Sydney Wanderers	v	Brisbane Roar	Sydney
15:00 AEST		Source		Stadium: CommBank Stadium

14 March 2027 21	Brisbane Roar	v	Adelaide United	Brisbane
16:00 AEST		Source		Stadium: Suncorp Stadium

21 March 2027 22	Brisbane Roar	v	Melbourne Victory	Brisbane
17:00 AEST				Stadium: Suncorp Stadium

3 April 2027 23	Brisbane Roar	v	Melbourne City	Brisbane
17:00 AEST		Report		Stadium: Suncorp Stadium

9 April 2027 24	Wellington Phoenix	v	Brisbane Roar	Wellington
19:00 NZST				Stadium: Hnry Stadium

18 April 2027 25	Auckland FC	v	Brisbane Roar	Auckland
15:00 NZDT		Report		Stadium: Go Media Stadium

24 April 2027 26	Adelaide United	v	Brisbane Roar	Adelaide
19:10 ACST		Source		Stadium: Coopers Stadium

30 April 2027 27	Brisbane Roar	v	Newcastle Jets	Brisbane
20:00 AEST		Report		Stadium: Suncorp Stadium

9 May 2027 28	Melbourne Victory	v	Brisbane Roar	Melbourne
15:00 AEST				Stadium: AAMI Park

=== Australia Cup ===
30 July 2026 Round of 32	Sydney Olympic	0–3	Brisbane Roar	Sydney
19:30 AEST		Report	Vidic 63'; Ngor 64'; Nasso 77'	Stadium: Belmore Sports Ground; Attendance: 1,115; Referee: Rowan Fisher

9 August 2026 Round of 16	Brisbane Roar	2–4	Sydney FC	Brisbane
17:00 AEST	Lauton 45+1'; A. Popovic 69' (o.g.)	Report	Sekine 2'; Garuccio 24'; Quintal 35'; G. Popovic 90+5'	Stadium: Spencer Park; Referee: Tom Fell

== Statistics ==
=== Appearances and goals ===
Includes all competitions. Players with no appearances not included in the list.

As of 21 November 2026

No.	Pos	Nat	Player	Total		A-League Men		Australia Cup	
No.	Pos	Nat	Player	Apps	Goals	Apps	Goals	Apps	Goals
1	GK	(Australia) AUS	Dean Bouzanis	2	0	0	0	2	0
2	DF	(Australia) AUS	Jacob Nasso	3	1	0+1	0	2	1
3	DF	(Australia) AUS	Dimitri Valkanis	2	0	0	0	2	0
5	DF	(Scotland) SCO	Tom Aldred	4	1	4	1	0	0
6	MF	(Australia) AUS	Noah Maieroni	6	0	3+1	0	2	0
8	MF	(Australia) AUS	Tyrese Francois	4	0	4	0	0	0
9	MF	(Moldova) MDA	Virgiliu Postolachi	4	0	4	0	0	0
10	MF	(South Korea) KOR	Nam Tae-hee	5	1	4	1	1	0
11	FW	(Germany) GER	Marko Ilic	6	0	0+4	0	2	0
13	DF	(Australia) AUS	Tate Russell	4	0	4	0	0	0
14	MF	(Australia) AUS	Emin Durakovic	3	0	0+2	0	0+1	0
15	DF	(Australia) AUS	Hosine Bility	4	0	1+1	0	2	0
16	DF	(Australia) AUS	Joel King	4	0	4	0	0	0
17	FW	(Australia) AUS	Justin Vidic	6	3	4	2	2	1
19	FW	(Australia) AUS	Sabit Ngor	6	2	4	1	2	1
22	FW	(Australia) AUS	Nathan Amanatidis	6	0	0+4	0	0+2	0
32	DF	(Australia) AUS	Charlie Parkin	2	0	0	0	0+2	0
36	FW	(Australia) AUS	Ianni Valkanis	1	0	0	0	0+1	0
39	FW	(Australia) AUS	Niall Thom	3	0	0+1	0	0+2	0
40	MF	(Australia) AUS	George Plusnin	4	0	4	0	0	0
41	MF	(Australia) AUS	Emmett Shaw	1	0	0+1	0	0	0
44	MF	(Australia) AUS	Jordan Lauton	5	1	0+3	0	2	1
53	DF	(Australia) AUS	Archie Mitchell	1	0	0	0	1	0
77	MF	(Bosnia and Herzegovina) BIH	Milorad Stajić	6	0	4	0	2	0

=== Disciplinary record ===
Includes all competitions. The list is sorted by squad number when total cards are equal. Players with no cards not included in the list.

As of 21 November 2026

Rank	No.	Pos.	Nat.	Name	A-League Men			Australia Cup			Total							
Rank	No.	Pos.	Nat.	Name	Yellow card	(yellow card) (yellow-red card)	Red card	Yellow card	(yellow card) (yellow-red card)	Red card	Yellow card	(yellow card) (yellow-red card)	Red card					
Rank	No.	Pos.	Nat.	Name	1	19	FW	(Australia)	Sabit Ngor	2	0	0	1	0	0	3	0	0
2	6	MF	(Australia)	Noah Maieroni	1	0	0	1	0	0	2	0	0					
2	17	FW	(Australia)	Justin Vidic	2	0	0	0	0	0	2	0	0					
2	22	FW	(Australia)	Nathan Amanatidis	2	0	0	0	0	0	2	0	0					
2	77	MF	(Bosnia and Herzegovina)	Milorad Stajić	1	0	0	1	0	0	2	0	0					
6	2	DF	(Australia)	Jacob Nasso	0	0	0	1	0	0	1	0	0					
6	5	DF	(Scotland)	Tom Aldred	1	0	0	0	0	0	1	0	0					
6	16	DF	(Australia)	Joel King	1	0	0	0	0	0	1	0	0					
Total					10	0	0	4	0	0	14	0	0					

=== Clean sheets ===
Includes all competitions. The list is sorted by squad number when total clean sheets are equal. Numbers in parentheses represent games where both goalkeepers participated and both kept a clean sheet; the number in parentheses is awarded to the goalkeeper who was substituted on, whilst a full clean sheet is awarded to the goalkeeper who was on the field at the start of play. Goalkeepers with no clean sheets not included in the list.

As of 21 November 2026

Rank	No.	Nat.	Goalkeeper	A-League Men	Australia Cup	Total
1	1	(Australia)	Dean Bouzanis	0	1	1
1	40	(Australia)	George Plusnin	1	0	1
Total				1	1	2

== See also ==
- 2026–27 Brisbane Roar FC (women) season
