= 2025–26 Brisbane Roar FC season =

Brisbane Roar
2025–26 season
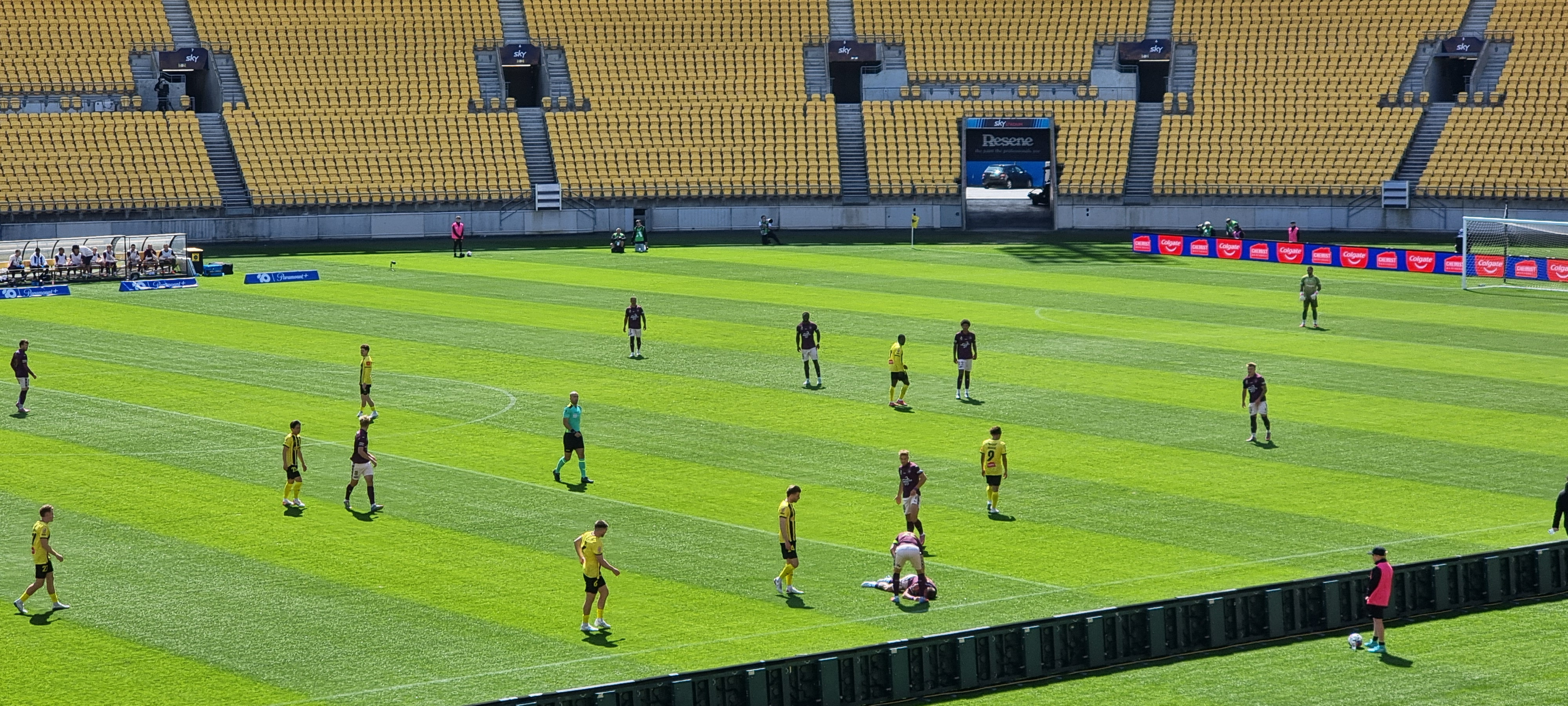
- Brisbane Roar playing away to Wellington Phoenix.
- Owner: Bakrie Group
- Chairman: Kaz Patafta
- Head Coach: Michael Valkanis
- Stadium: Suncorp Stadium; Dolphin Stadium (select matches)
- A-League Men: 11th
- A-League Men Finals: DNQ
- Top goalscorer: League: Sam Klein; Chris Long; Justin Vidic (4); All: Sam Klein; Chris Long; Justin Vidic (4)
- Highest home attendance: 9,651 vs. Adelaide United (24 January 2026); A-League Men
- Lowest home attendance: 3,610; Perth Glory (28 February 2026); A-League Men
- Average home league attendance: 6,624
- Biggest win: 3–0 vs. Newcastle Jets (H) (9 November 2025); A-League Men
- Biggest defeat: 0–3 vs. Wellington Phoenix (H) (3 January 2026); A-League Men; 1–4 vs. Newcastle Jets (A) (31 January 2026); A-League Men
Home colours	Away colours	Third colours
- All statistics correct as of 25 April 2026.

The 2025–26 season was Brisbane Roar Football Club's 21st season in the A-League Men. In addition to the domestic league, Brisbane Roar also participated in this season's edition of the Australia Cup Play-offs.

== Players ==
Note: Flags indicate national team as defined under FIFA eligibility rules; some limited exceptions apply. Players may hold more than one non-FIFA nationality.

No.	Pos.	Nation	Player
1	GK	AUS	Dean Bouzanis
2	DF	CRC	Youstin Salas (on loan from Sporting San José)
3	DF	AUS	Dimitri Valkanis (on loan from AEK Athens)
4	DF	AUS	Ben Warland
5	DF	NOR	Marius Lode (on loan from BK Häcken)
6	DF	AUS	Austin Ludwik
7	FW	AUS	Jacob Brazete (scholarship)
8	MF	AUS	Sam Klein (scholarship)
9	FW	ENG	Chris Long
10	MF	GRE	Georgios Vrakas
11	GK	AUS	Macklin Freke
13	FW	AUS	Henry Hore
15	DF	AUS	Hosine Bility

No.	Pos.	Nation	Player
16	DF	AUS	Matthew Dench
17	FW	AUS	Justin Vidic
19	FW	AUS	Michael Ruhs
21	DF	AUS	Antonee Burke-Gilroy
22	FW	AUS	Nathan Amanatidis
23	DF	NZL	James McGarry
25	FW	AUS	Nicholas D'Agostino (on loan from Viking)
26	MF	IRL	Jay O'Shea (captain)
27	FW	AUS	Ben Halloran
30	MF	AUS	Quinn MacNicol (scholarship)
31	MF	AUS	Noah Maieroni (scholarship)
44	MF	AUS	Jordan Lauton
77	MF	BIH	Milorad Stajić

== Transfers and contracts ==
=== Transfers in ===
No.	Position	Name	From	Type/fee	Contract length	Date	Ref.
77	MF	(Bosnia and Herzegovina) Milorad Stajić	(Serbia) Radnički Niš	Free transfer	2 years	17 June 2025	
23	DF	(New Zealand) James McGarry	(Scotland) Aberdeen	Free transfer	3 years	1 July 2025	
15	DF	Hosine Bility	(Portugal) Mafra	Undisclosed	2 years	1 July 2025	
19	FW	Michael Ruhs	Western United	Free transfer	1 year	1 July 2025	
20	GK	Dean Bouzanis	(England) Charlton Athletic	Free transfer	1 year (Note: Option for an additional year.)	7 July 2025	
9	FW	(England) Chris Long	Unattached	Free transfer	1 year	24 July 2025	
17	FW	Justin Vidic	Unattached	Free transfer	2 years	28 July 2025	
3	DF	Dimitri Valkanis	(Greece) AEK Athens	Loan	1 year	12 August 2025	
10	MF	(Greece) Georgios Vrakas	(Greece) Atromitos	Free transfer	2 years	13 August 2025	
2	DF	(Costa Rica) Youstin Salas	(Costa Rica) Sporting San José	Loan	1 year	16 September 2025	
44	MF	Jordan Lauton	Unattached	Free transfer	2 years	18 September 2025	
16	DF	Matthew Dench	(Australia) Oakleigh Cannons	Free transfer	1 year	19 September 2025	
25	FW	Nicholas D'Agostino	(Norway) Viking	Loan	6 months	17 January 2026	
5	DF	(Norway) Marius Lode	(Sweden) BK Häcken	Loan	5 months	10 February 2026	

==== From youth squad ====
N	Pos.	Nat.	Name	Age	Notes
31	MF	(Australia)	Noah Maieroni	20	2-year scholarship contract

=== Transfers out ===
No.	Position	Name	To	Type/fee	Date	Ref.
3	DF	Corey Brown	(Australia) Brisbane City	End of contract	4 June 2025	
7	FW	(Indonesia) Rafael Struick	Unattached	End of contract	30 June 2025	
8	MF	(Lebanon) Walid Shour	Unattached	Mutual contract termination	30 June 2025	
10	MF	(France) Florin Berenguer	Unattached	End of contract	30 June 2025	
11	FW	(Portugal) Asumah Abubakar	Unattached	End of contract	30 June 2025	
15	DF	Hosine Bility	(Portugal) Mafra	End of loan	30 June 2025	
19	DF	(Sri Lanka) Jack Hingert	(Australia) Wynnum Wolves	End of contract	25 June 2025	
23	MF	Keegan Jelacic	(Belgium) Gent	End of loan	30 June 2025	
29	GK	Matt Acton	(Australia) Lions FC	End of contract	30 June 2025	
35	MF	Louis Zabala	Unattached	End of contract	30 June 2025	
43	FW	Adam Zimarino	Unattached	End of contract	30 June 2025	
14	DF	Pearson Kasawaya	Unattached	Mutual contract termination	15 September 2025	
12	DF	Lucas Herrington	(United States) Colorado Rapids	Undisclosed	4 January 2026	
5	DF	Marcus Ferkranus	Unattached	Mutual contract termination	14 January 2026	

=== Contract extensions ===
No.	Name	Position	Duration	Date	Notes
6	Austin Ludwik	Central defender	1 year	27 June 2025	
21	Antonee Burke-Gilroy	Right-back	1 year	27 June 2025	Contract extension triggered

== Pre-season and friendlies ==
15 July 2025	Caboolture (Australia)	0–9	(Australia) Brisbane Roar	Burpengary, Australia
19:30 AEST		Report	Vidic 8'; Ruhs 51', 68', 70', 74'; MacNicol 50', 59', 62'; O'Reilly 81'	Stadium: Moreton Bay Central Sports Complex

23 July 2025	Holland Park (Australia)	Cancelled	(Australia) Brisbane Roar	Brisbane, Australia
19:30 AEST		Cancellation		Stadium: Whites Hill Reserve

29 July 2025	St George Willawong (Australia)	1–1	(Australia) Brisbane Roar	Brisbane, Australia
19:30 AEST	?	Report	Ruhs	Stadium: Nudgee Recreation Reserve

3 August 2025	Brisbane Roar (Australia)	2–2	(New Zealand) Auckland FC	Brisbane, Australia
12:30 AEST	Ruhs 38'; Vidic 60'	Report	Randall 33'; Gillion 90'	Stadium: Imperial Corp Stadium

9 August 2025	Newcastle Jets (Australia)	1–3	(Australia) Brisbane Roar	Lismore, Australia
15:00 AEST	Bouzanis 61' (o.g.)	Report	Ruhs 20', 35'; Hore 46'	Stadium: Oakes Oval

19 August 2025	Moreton City Excelsior (Australia)	0–7	(Australia) Brisbane Roar	Moreton Bay, Australia
19:30 AEST		Report	Vidic 21', 52'; Ruhs 27'; McGarry 42'; Ozzi 79', 88' (pen.); Poon 82'	Stadium: South Pine Sports Complex

24 August 2025	Brisbane Roar (Australia)	2–0	(Australia) Central Coast Mariners	Sunshine Coast, Australia
13:30 AEST	Vidic 39'; McGarry 83'	Report		Stadium: Sunshine Coast Stadium; Attendance: 6,815

26 August 2025	Peninsula Power (Australia)	0–1	(Australia) Brisbane Roar	Kippa-Ring, Australia
19:00 AEST		Report	Brazete 42' (pen.)	Stadium: A.J. Kelly Park
Note: 70 minute match

6 September 2025	Brisbane Roar (Australia)	0–1	(Australia) Sydney FC	Brisbane, Australia
		Report	Macallister (pen.)	Stadium: Goodwin Park

10 September 2025	Olympic FC (Australia)	0–8	(Australia) Brisbane Roar	Brisbane, Australia
19:30 AEST		Report	Long 16', 45'; Dench 25'; Brazete 31'; MacNicol 54', 58'; Valkanis 61'; Ozzi 89'	Stadium: Goodwin Park

20 September 2025	Queensland State Team (Australia)	0–2	(Australia) Brisbane Roar	Brisbane, Australia
18:00 AEST		Report	Lauton 25'; Hore 90'	Stadium: Perry Park

23 September 2025	Queensland State Team (Australia)	0–1	(Australia) Brisbane Roar	Kippa-Ring, Australia
19:30 AEST		Report	Ruhs 85'	Stadium: A.J. Kelly Park

2 October 2025	Solomon Islands U23	0–1	(Australia) Brisbane Roar	Honiara, Solomon Islands
		Report	Lauton
Note: 60 minute match

4 October 2025	Solomon Islands	1–1	(Australia) Brisbane Roar	Honiara, Solomon Islands
18:00 SBT	Sam 40'	Report	Vrakas	Stadium: National Stadium

== Competitions ==
=== Overall record ===
Competition	First match	Last match	Starting round	Final position	Record							
Competition	First match	Last match	Starting round	Final position	Pld	W	D	L	GF	GA	GD	Win %
A-League Men	17 October 2025	25 April 2026	Matchday 1	11th	26	6	8	12	27	36	−9	23.08
Total					26	6	8	12	27	36	−9	23.08

Last updated: 25 April 2026
Source: Competitions

=== A-League Men ===
==== League table ====
Pos	Team	Pld	W	D	L	GF	GA	GD	Pts
8	Wellington Phoenix (Note: Auckland FC and Wellington Phoenix cannot qualify for Asian Football Confederation competitions as they are based in New Zealand, which is part of the Oceania Football Confederation.)	26	9	6	11	36	48	−12	33
9	Central Coast Mariners	26	8	8	10	35	42	−7	32
10	Perth Glory	26	8	7	11	32	39	−7	31
11	Brisbane Roar	26	6	8	12	27	36	−9	26
12	Western Sydney Wanderers	26	5	6	15	27	43	−16	21

Source: A-Leagues
Rules for classification: 1) points; 2) goal difference; 3) goals scored; 4) wins; 5) head-to-head results; 5a) head-to-head points; 5b) head-to-head goal difference; 6) Fair Play points; 7) away goal difference; 8) away goals per match; 9) home goal difference; 10) home goals per match; 11) toss of a coin in an event of a tie of two clubs.

==== Results summary ====
Overall								Home						Away					
Pld	W	D	L	GF	GA	GD	Pts	W	D	L	GF	GA	GD	W	D	L	GF	GA	GD
26	7	8	11	27	36	−9	29	4	4	5	14	18	−4	3	4	6	13	18	−5

Last updated: 25 April 2026.
Source: Ultimate A-League

==== Results by round ====
Round	1	2	3	4	5	6	7	8	9	10	11	20	12	13	14	15	16	17	18	19	21	22	23	24	25	26
Ground	H	A	H	H	A	H	A	A	A	A	H	A	H	A	H	A	H	A	A	H	H	H	H	A	H	A
Result	W	L	D	W	D	W	W	D	L	W	L	L	L	W	L	L	L	D	L	D	D	L	D	D	L	L
Position	3	7	6	4	5	2	2	3	3	3	3	4	5	4	6	7	8	8	9	8	9	10	10	11	11	11
Points	3	3	4	7	8	11	14	15	15	18	18	18	18	21	21	21	21	22	22	23	24	24	25	26	26	26

Updated to match(es) played on 25 April 2026. Source: Ultimate A-League
A = Away; H = Home; W = Win; D = Draw; L = Loss

==== Matches ====
The fixtures for the 2025–26 A-League Men season were released on 11 September 2025.

Win Draw Loss Fixtures

17 October 2025 1	Brisbane Roar	1–0	Macarthur FC	Brisbane
20:05 AEST	O'Shea 38' (pen.)	Report		Stadium: Suncorp Stadium; Attendance: 6,218; Referee: Adam Kersey

26 October 2025 2	Wellington Phoenix	2–1	Brisbane Roar	Wellington
15:00 NZDT	Nagasawa 76'; Armiento 90+6'	Report	Vidic 42'	Stadium: Sky Stadium; Attendance: 6,890; Referee: Daniel Elder

31 October 2025 3	Brisbane Roar	0–0	Melbourne City	Brisbane
19:35 AEDT		Report		Stadium: Suncorp Stadium; Attendance: 5,166; Referee: Ben Abraham

9 November 2025 4	Brisbane Roar	3–0	Newcastle Jets	Bokarina
16:00 AEST	Herrington 31'; O'Shea 79' (pen.); Delianov 89' (o.g.)	Report		Stadium: Sunshine Coast Stadium; Attendance: 7,122; Referee: Alireza Faghani

23 November 2025 5	Auckland FC	1–1	Brisbane Roar	Auckland
15:00 NZDT	Brook 18'	Report	Vidic 45+2'	Stadium: Go Media Stadium; Attendance: 12,379; Referee: Ben Abraham

28 November 2025 6	Brisbane Roar	1–0	Melbourne Victory	Brisbane
19:35 AEDT	Klein 3'	Report		Stadium: Suncorp Stadium; Attendance: 8,218; Referee: Shaun Evans

7 December 2025 7	Adelaide United	0–1	Brisbane Roar	Adelaide
19:05 ACDT		Report	Long 90+5'	Stadium: Coopers Stadium; Attendance: 10,678; Referee: Sam Kelly

13 December 2025 8	Western Sydney Wanderers	0–0	Brisbane Roar	Sydney
17:00 AEDT		Report		Stadium: CommBank Stadium; Attendance: 4,652; Referee: Adam Kersey

19 December 2025 9	Macarthur FC	2–1	Brisbane Roar	Sydney
19:05 AEDT	Sawyer 66' (pen.), 73' (pen.)	Report	Dench 48'	Stadium: Campbelltown Sports Stadium; Attendance: 2,734; Referee: Adam Kersey
Note: The match was originally scheduled for 18:00, but was delayed to 19:05 due to adverse weather conditions.

31 December 2025 10	Central Coast Mariners	1–2	Brisbane Roar	Gosford
19:00 AEDT	Mauragis 29'	Report	Ruhs 22'; Vidic 90+2'	Stadium: Polytec Stadium; Attendance: 11,517; Referee: Alex King

3 January 2026 11	Brisbane Roar	0–3	Wellington Phoenix	Kippa-Ring
16:00 AEST		Report	Eze 6'; Nagasawa 59'; Retre 90+1'	Stadium: Kayo Stadium; Attendance: 8,961; Referee: Ben Abraham

6 January 2026 20	Melbourne City	1–0	Brisbane Roar	Melbourne
19:00 AEDT	Caputo 11'	Report		Stadium: AAMI Park; Attendance: 3,683; Referee: Tim Danaskos

9 January 2026 12	Brisbane Roar	0–2	Auckland FC	Brisbane
18:35 AEST		Report	Cosgrove 6'; Brook 73'	Stadium: Suncorp Stadium; Attendance: 9,363; Referee: Alireza Faghani

16 January 2026 13	Perth Glory	1–2	Brisbane Roar	Perth
18:45 AWST	Taggart 19'	Report	Long 30' (pen.); Klein 50'	Stadium: HBF Park; Attendance: 12,594; Referee: Adam Kersey

24 January 2026 14	Brisbane Roar	2–3	Adelaide United	Brisbane
16:00 AEST	Klein 41'; Long 60'	Report	Burkitt 56', 70', 90+2'	Stadium: Suncorp Stadium; Attendance: 9,651; Referee: Alireza Faghani

31 January 2026 15	Newcastle Jets	4–1	Brisbane Roar	Newcastle
17:00 AEDT	Rose 18' (pen.); Taylor 52'; Bayliss 64', 90+1'	Report	Valkanis 62'	Stadium: McDonald Jones Stadium; Attendance: 12,162; Referee: Alex King

7 February 2026 16	Brisbane Roar	1–2	Central Coast Mariners	Kippa-Ring
16:00 AEST	D'Agostino 44'	Report	Di Pizio 45+2'; Roux 79'	Stadium: Kayo Stadium; Attendance: 5,714; Referee: Lachlan Keevers

14 February 2026 17	Melbourne Victory	1–1	Brisbane Roar	Melbourne
17:00 AEDT	Nduka 13'	Report	D'Agostino 76'	Stadium: AAMI Park; Attendance: 11,163; Referee: Shaun Evans

21 February 2026 18	Sydney FC	1–0	Brisbane Roar	Sydney
17:00 AEDT	Quintal 54'	Report		Stadium: Allianz Stadium; Attendance: 10,087; Referee: Alex King

28 February 2026 19	Brisbane Roar	1–1	Perth Glory	Kippa-Ring
15:00 AEST	Long 16'	Report	Salas 19' (o.g.)	Stadium: Kayo Stadium; Attendance: 3,610; Referee: Adam Kersey
Note: The match was relocated from Suncorp Stadium due to heavy usage of the surface.

13 March 2026 21	Brisbane Roar	2–2	Western Sydney Wanderers	Brisbane
18:00 AEST	Vrakas 5'; Thom 74'	Report	Borrello 35'; Kraev 45+4'	Stadium: Suncorp Stadium; Attendance: 4,769; Referee: Sam Kelly

21 March 2026 22	Brisbane Roar	1–2	Wellington Phoenix	Brisbane
14:00 AEST	McGarry 14'	Report	Piper 36'; Eze 86'	Stadium: Suncorp Stadium; Attendance: 4,826; Referee: Alireza Faghani

2 April 2026 23	Brisbane Roar	0–0	Sydney FC	Brisbane
20:00 AEST		Report		Stadium: Suncorp Stadium; Attendance: 5,648; Referee: Alireza Faghani

10 April 2026 24	Central Coast Mariners	2–2	Brisbane Roar	Gosford
19:35 AEST	Mantell 53'; Brandtman 58'	Report	Klein 4'; Lauton 90+3'	Stadium: polytec Stadium; Attendance: 5,421; Referee: Nathan Shakespear

18 April 2026 25	Brisbane Roar	2–3	Melbourne City	Brisbane
17:00 AEST	Vidic 44'; Salas 90+2'	Report	Younis 61' (pen.), 66'; Memeti 80'	Stadium: Suncorp Stadium; Attendance: 6,845; Referee: Daniel Elder

25 April 2026 26	Perth Glory	2–1	Brisbane Roar	Perth
19:45 AWST	Popovic 8' (pen.); Despotovski 76'	Report	Valkanis 65'	Stadium: HBF Park; Attendance: 6,901; Referee: Tim Danaskos

== Statistics ==
=== Appearances and goals ===
Includes all competitions. Players with no appearances not included in the list.

As of 25 April 2026

No.	Pos	Nat	Player	Total		A-League Men	
No.	Pos	Nat	Player	Apps	Goals	Apps	Goals
Goalkeepers
1	GK	(Australia) AUS	Dean Bouzanis	26	0	26	0
11	GK	(Australia) AUS	Macklin Freke	1	0	0+1	0
Defenders
2	DF	(Costa Rica) CRC	Youstin Salas	26	0	26	0
3	DF	(Australia) AUS	Dimitri Valkanis	23	2	23	2
4	DF	(Australia) AUS	Ben Warland	1	0	0+1	0
5	DF	(Norway) NOR	Marius Lode	9	0	9	0
6	DF	(Australia) AUS	Austin Ludwik	9	0	9	0
15	DF	(Australia) AUS	Hosine Bility	7	0	6+1	0
16	DF	(Australia) AUS	Matthew Dench	12	1	5+7	1
21	DF	(Australia) AUS	Antonee Burke-Gilroy	1	0	0+1	0
23	DF	(New Zealand) NZL	James McGarry	24	1	24	1
35	DF	(Australia) AUS	Mikael Evagorou-Alao	1	0	0+1	0
Midfielders
8	MF	(Australia) AUS	Samuel Klein	25	4	25	4
10	MF	(Greece) GRE	Georgios Vrakas	24	1	18+6	1
26	MF	(Republic of Ireland) IRL	Jay O'Shea	21	2	19+2	2
30	MF	(Australia) AUS	Quinn MacNicol	15	0	1+14	0
31	MF	(Australia) AUS	Noah Maieroni	20	0	12+8	0
41	MF	(Australia) AUS	Emmett Shaw	7	0	0+7	0
44	MF	(Australia) AUS	Jordan Lauton	19	1	5+14	1
47	MF	(Australia) AUS	James Durrington	2	0	2	0
77	MF	(Bosnia and Herzegovina) BIH	Milorad Stajić	6	0	6	0
Forwards
7	FW	(Australia) AUS	Jacob Brazete	4	0	0+4	0
9	FW	(England) ENG	Chris Long	17	4	14+3	4
13	FW	(Australia) AUS	Henry Hore	16	0	11+5	0
17	FW	(Australia) AUS	Justin Vidic	23	4	13+10	4
19	FW	(Australia) AUS	Michael Ruhs	25	1	16+9	1
25	FW	(Australia) AUS	Nicholas D'Agostino	6	2	4+2	2
27	FW	(Australia) AUS	Ben Halloran	5	0	0+5	0
39	FW	(Australia) AUS	Niall Thom	6	1	2+4	1
Player(s) transferred out but featured this season
12	DF	(Australia) AUS	Lucas Herrington	11	1	10+1	1

=== Disciplinary record ===
Includes all competitions. The list is sorted by squad number when total cards are equal. Players with no cards not included in the list.

As of 25 April 2026

Rank	No.	Pos.	Nat.	Name	A-League Men			Total							
Rank	No.	Pos.	Nat.	Name	Booked	(yellow card) (yellow-red card)	Sent off (straight red)	Booked	(yellow card) (yellow-red card)	Sent off (straight red)					
Rank	No.	Pos.	Nat.	Name	1	3	DF	(Australia)	Dimitri Valkanis	4	1	0	4	1	0
2	9	FW	(England)	Chris Long	3	1	0	3	1	0					
3	31	MF	(Australia)	Noah Maeironi	8	0	0	8	0	0					
4	8	MF	(Australia)	Sam Klein	7	0	0	7	0	0					
5	17	FW	(Australia)	Justin Vidic	6	0	0	6	0	0					
6	2	DF	(Costa Rica)	Youstin Salas	5	0	0	5	0	0					
6	19	FW	(Australia)	Michael Ruhs	5	0	0	5	0	0					
6	23	DF	(New Zealand)	James McGarry	5	0	0	5	0	0					
9	1	GK	(Australia)	Dean Bouzanis	4	0	0	4	0	0					
10	10	MF	(Greece)	Georgios Vrakas	3	0	0	3	0	0					
10	26	MF	(Republic of Ireland)	Jay O'Shea	3	0	0	3	0	0					
12	13	FW	(Australia)	Henry Hore	2	0	0	2	0	0					
12	25	FW	(Australia)	Nicholas D'Agostino	2	0	0	2	0	0					
12	77	MF	(Bosnia and Herzegovina)	Milorad Stajić	2	0	0	2	0	0					
15	6	DF	(Australia)	Austin Ludwik	1	0	0	1	0	0					
15	7	FW	(Australia)	Jacob Brazete	1	0	0	1	0	0					
15	15	DF	(Australia)	Hosine Bility	1	0	0	1	0	0					
15	30	MF	(Australia)	Quinn MacNicol	1	0	0	1	0	0					
15	35	DF	(Australia)	Mikael Evagorou-Alao	1	0	0	1	0	0					
15	44	MF	(Australia)	Jordan Lauton	1	0	0	1	0	0					
Player(s) transferred out but featured this season
1	12	DF	(Australia)	Lucas Herrington	2	0	0	2	0	0					
Total					67	2	0	67	2	0					

=== Clean sheets ===
Includes all competitions. The list is sorted by squad number when total clean sheets are equal. Numbers in parentheses represent games where both goalkeepers participated and both kept a clean sheet; the number in parentheses is awarded to the goalkeeper who was substituted on, whilst a full clean sheet is awarded to the goalkeeper who was on the field at the start of play. Goalkeepers with no clean sheets not included in the list.

As of 25 April 2026

Rank	No.	Nat.	Goalkeeper	A-League Men	Total
1	1	(Australia)	Dean Bouzanis	7	7
Total				7	7

== See also ==
- 2025–26 Brisbane Roar FC (women) season
