= 2024–25 Brisbane Roar FC season =

Brisbane Roar
2024–25 season
- Owner: Bakrie Group
- Chairman: Kaz Patafta
- Head Coach: Ruben Zadkovich (until 6 May 2025); Michael Valkanis (from 7 May 2025)
- Stadium: Suncorp Stadium
- A-League Men: 12th
- A-League Men Finals: DNQ
- 2024 Australia Cup: Play-offs
- 2025 Australia Cup preliminary rounds: Play-off
- Top goalscorer: League: Sam Klein (5); All: Sam Klein (5)
- Highest home attendance: 8,726 vs. Sydney FC (1 November 2024); A-League Men
- Lowest home attendance: 2,454 vs. Adelaide United (22 April 2025); A-League Men
- Average home league attendance: 5,463
- Biggest win: 3–1 vs. Perth Glory (A) (15 March 2025); A-League Men
- Biggest defeat: 1–5 vs. Macarthur FC (H) (4 April 2025); A-League Men
Home colours	Away colours	Third colours
- All statistics correct as of 14 May 2025.

The 2024–25 season is Brisbane Roar Football Club's 20th season in the A-League Men. In addition to the domestic league, Brisbane Roar also participated in this season's editions of the Australia Cup.

== Players ==
Note: Flags indicate national team as defined under FIFA eligibility rules; some limited exceptions apply. Players may hold more than one non-FIFA nationality.

No.	Pos.	Nation	Player
1	GK	AUS	Macklin Freke
3	DF	AUS	Corey Brown
4	DF	AUS	Ben Warland
5	DF	USA	Marcus Ferkranus
6	DF	AUS	Austin Ludwik
7	FW	IDN	Rafael Struick
8	MF	LBN	Walid Shour
10	MF	FRA	Florin Berenguer
11	FW	POR	Asumah Abubakar
12	DF	AUS	Lucas Herrington (scholarship)
13	FW	AUS	Henry Hore
14	DF	AUS	Pearson Kasawaya (scholarship)
15	DF	AUS	Hosine Bility (on loan from Mafra)

No.	Pos.	Nation	Player
17	FW	AUS	Nathan Amanatidis
18	MF	AUS	Jacob Brazete (scholarship)
19	DF	SRI	Jack Hingert
21	DF	AUS	Antonee Burke-Gilroy
23	MF	AUS	Keegan Jelacic (on loan from Gent)
24	MF	AUS	Sam Klein (scholarship)
26	MF	IRL	Jay O'Shea (captain)
27	FW	AUS	Ben Halloran
29	GK	AUS	Matt Acton
30	MF	AUS	Quinn MacNicol (scholarship)
35	MF	AUS	Louis Zabala
43	FW	AUS	Adam Zimarino

== Transfers and contracts ==
=== Transfers in ===
No.	Position	Name	From	Type/fee	Contract length	Date	Ref.
17	DF	Harry Van Der Saag	Adelaide United	Free transfer	2 years	17 May 2024	
4	DF	Ben Warland	Adelaide United	Free transfer	2 years	20 May 2024	
27	FW	Ben Halloran	Unattached	Free transfer	2 years	5 June 2024	
5	DF	(United States) Marcus Ferkranus	(United States) LA Galaxy	Free transfer	2 years	7 June 2024	
15	DF	Hosine Bility	(Portugal) Mafra	Loan	1 year	19 June 2024	
8	MF	(Lebanon) Walid Shour	(Lebanon) Al Ahed	Free transfer	2 years	25 June 2024	
43	FW	Adam Zimarino	Perth Glory	Free transfer	1 year	27 June 2024	
7	FW	(Indonesia) Rafael Struick	(Netherlands) ADO Den Haag	Free transfer	1 year	16 September 2024	
11	MF	(Ecuador) Néicer Acosta	(Ecuador) Guayaquil City	Free transfer	1 year (Note: Option for an additional year.)	17 September 2024	
14	DF	Pearson Kasawaya	Sydney FC Youth	Scholarship	2 years	19 September 2024	
18	MF	Jacob Brazete	Sydney FC Youth	Scholarship	2 years	19 September 2024	
13	MF	Henry Hore	(South Korea) Gangwon FC	End of loan	(1.5 years)	16 January 2025	
17	FW	Nathan Amanatidis	Sydney FC	Free transfer	2.5 years	23 January 2025	
6	DF	Austin Ludwik	(Australia) Gold Coast Knights	Free transfer	5 months	3 February 2025	
11	FW	(Portugal) Asumah Abubakar	(Switzerland) Grasshopper	Free transfer	5 months	12 February 2025	

==== From youth squad ====
N	Pos.	Nat.	Name	Age	Notes
12	DF	(Australia)	Lucas Herrington	17	3-year scholarship contract
24	MF	(Australia)	Sam Klein	20	2-year scholarship contract

=== Transfers out ===
No.	Position	Name	To	Type/fee	Date	Ref.
27	DF	Kai Trewin	Melbourne City	End of contract	17 May 2024	
5	DF	(Scotland) Tom Aldred	Unattached	End of contract	27 May 2024	
8	FW	Jonas Markovski	Unattached	End of contract	21 June 2024	
10	FW	Nikola Mileusnic	Unattached	End of contract	21 June 2024	
12	MF	Taras Gomulka	Perth Glory	Mutual contract termination	21 June 2024	
17	FW	Carlo Armiento	Unattached	End of contract	21 June 2024	
18	MF	Shae Cahill	Unattached	Mutual contract termination	21 June 2024	
32	DF	James Nikolovski	Unattached	End of contract	21 June 2024	
99	FW	(South Sudan) Ayom Majok	Unattached	End of contract	21 June 2024	
13	MF	Henry Hore	(South Korea) Gangwon FC	Loan	1 July 2024	
20	FW	(New Zealand) Marco Rojas	Wellington Phoenix	End of contract	9 July 2024	
11	FW	Jez Lofthouse	Unattached	End of contract	17 September 2024	
14	FW	Rylan Brownlie	(England) Crystal Palace	Mutual contract termination	17 September 2024	
44	DF	Ryan Lethlean	(Australia) Heidelberg United	Mutual contract termination	17 September 2024	
6	MF	Joe Caletti	(Japan) Tochigi City	Mutual contract termination	2 January 2025	
17	DF	Harry Van Der Saag	Unattached	Mutual contract termination	6 January 2025	
16	FW	Thomas Waddingham	(England) Portsmouth	Undisclosed	22 January 2025	
2	DF	Scott Neville	Retired		31 January 2025	
22	FW	Alex Parsons	(Northern Ireland) Cliftonville	Mutual contract termination	2 February 2025	
11	MF	(Ecuador) Néicer Acosta	Unattached	Mutual contract termination	3 February 2025	

=== Contract extensions ===
No.	Name	Position	Duration	Date	Notes
1	Macklin Freke	Goalkeeper	2 years	24 April 2024	
29	Matt Acton	Goalkeeper	1 year	24 April 2024	
21	Antonee Burke-Gilroy	Right-back	1 year	26 April 2024	
19	(Sri Lanka) Jack Hingert	Right-back	1 year	29 April 2024	
6	Joe Caletti	Central midfielder	1 year	30 April 2024	
14	Rylan Brownlie	Forward		21 June 2024	
30	Quinn MacNicol	Attacking midfielder	2 years	21 June 2024	
35	Louis Zabala	Midfielder		21 June 2024	
13	Henry Hore	Attacking midfielder	1 year	1 July 2024	Contract extended from end of 2024–25 to end of 2025–26
23	Keegan Jelacic	Attacking midfielder	1 year	2 July 2024	Extension of loan

== Pre-season and friendlies ==
24 August 2024 2024 Bandodkar Trophy GS	Dempo (India)	1–5	(Australia) Brisbane Roar	Fatorda, India
19:00 IST	Ali 80'	Report	Waddingham 47', 59'; Shour 63'; O'Shea 69'; Lofthouse 75'	Stadium: PJN Stadium

27 August 2024 2024 Bandodkar Trophy GS	Goa (India)	1–0	(Australia) Brisbane Roar	Fatorda, India
19:00 IST	Sadiku 51'	Report		Stadium: PJN Stadium

30 August 2024 2024 Bandodkar Trophy GS	Sporting Goa (India)	0–2	(Australia) Brisbane Roar	Fatorda, India
16:00 IST		Report	Zabala 40'; Van Der Saag 45+4'	Stadium: PJN Stadium

3 September 2024 2024 Bandodkar Trophy SF	Odisha (India)	2–1	(Australia) Brisbane Roar	Fatorda, India
19:00 IST	Boumous 16', 62'	Source	Waddingham 66'	Stadium: PJN Stadium

13 September 2024	Queensland State Team (Australia)	1–2	(Australia) Brisbane Roar	Brisbane, Australia
19:00 AEST	Francis 48'	Report	Halloran 69'; MacNicol 89'	Stadium: Underwood Park

5 October 2024	Adelaide United (Australia)	1–1	(Australia) Brisbane Roar	Mildura, Australia
17:30 AEST	Kitto ?'	Report	Acosta ?'	Stadium: Mildura Sporting Precinct

== Competitions ==
=== Overall record ===
Competition	First match	Last match	Starting round	Final position	Record							
Competition	First match	Last match	Starting round	Final position	Pld	W	D	L	GF	GA	GD	Win %
A-League Men	19 October 2024	2 May 2025	Matchday 1	12th	26	5	6	15	32	51	−19	19.23
2024 Australia Cup	23 July 2024		Play-offs	Play-offs	1	0	0	1	2	4	−2	0.00
2025 Australia Cup play-off	14 May 2025		Play-offs	Play-offs	1	0	0	1	0	1	−1	0.00
Total					28	5	6	17	34	56	−22	17.86

Last updated: 14 May 2025
Source: Competitions

=== A-League Men ===
==== League table ====
Pos	Team	Pld	W	D	L	GF	GA	GD	Pts	Qualification
9	Newcastle Jets	26	8	6	12	43	44	−1	30	
10	Central Coast Mariners	26	5	11	10	29	51	−22	26	Qualification for 2025 Australia Cup play-offs
11	Wellington Phoenix (Note: Auckland FC and Wellington Phoenix cannot qualify for Asian Football Confederation competitions as they are based in New Zealand, which is part of the Oceania Football Confederation.)	26	6	6	14	27	43	−16	24	Qualification for 2025 Australia Cup play-offs
12	Brisbane Roar	26	5	6	15	32	51	−19	21	Qualification for 2025 Australia Cup play-offs
13	Perth Glory	26	4	5	17	22	56	−34	17	Qualification for 2025 Australia Cup play-offs

Source: A-Leagues
Rules for classification: 1) points; 2) goal difference; 3) goals scored; 4) wins; 5) head-to-head results; 5a) head-to-head points; 5b) head-to-head goal difference; 6) Fair Play points; 7) away goal difference; 8) away goals per match; 9) home goal difference; 10) home goals per match; 11) toss of a coin in an event of a tie of two clubs.

==== Results summary ====
Overall								Home						Away					
Pld	W	D	L	GF	GA	GD	Pts	W	D	L	GF	GA	GD	W	D	L	GF	GA	GD
26	5	6	15	32	51	−19	21	2	2	9	12	26	−14	3	4	6	20	25	−5

Last updated: 2 May 2025.
Source: Ultimate A-League
Home figures include Brisbane Roar's 3–2 loss on neutral ground in Unite Round against Adelaide United on 23 November 2024.

==== Results by round ====
Round	1	2	3	4	5	6	7	8	9	10	12	11	13	14	15	17	18	19	20	21	22	23	24	25	26	27	16	28	29
Ground	A	B	H	A	N	A	H	A	H	A	H	H	A	B	A	H	A	B	A	H	A	A	H	H	A	H	H	H	A
Result	L	X	L	L	L	D	L	D	L	L	L	L	L	X	W	L	D	X	L	D	D	W	L	L	L	W	D	W	W
Position	12	12	13	13	13	13	13	12	13	13	13	13	13	13	13	13	13	13	13	13	13	12	12	12	13	12	12	12	12
Points	0	0	0	0	0	1	1	2	2	2	2	2	2	2	5	5	6	6	6	7	8	11	11	11	11	14	15	18	21

Updated to match(es) played on 2 May 2025. Source: Ultimate A-League
A = Away; H = Home; N = Neutral; B = Bye; W = Win; D = Draw; L = Loss; X = Bye

==== Matches ====
Win Draw Loss Fixtures

19 October 2024 1	Auckland FC	2–0	Brisbane Roar	Auckland
17:00 NZDT	Van Der Saag 8' (o.g.); Rogerson 74'	Report		Stadium: Go Media Stadium; Attendance: 24,492; Referee: Daniel Elder

1 November 2024 3	Brisbane Roar	2–3	Sydney FC	Brisbane
18:35 AEST	Waddingham 67'; Struick 78'	Report	Klimala 51'; Sena 71'; Kucharski 90'	Stadium: Suncorp Stadium; Attendance: 8,726; Referee: Shane Skinner

9 November 2024 4	Melbourne Victory	2–0	Brisbane Roar	Melbourne
17:00 AEDT	Velupillay 37'; Geria 76'	Report		Stadium: AAMI Park; Attendance: 11,251; Referee: Tim Danaskos

23 November 2024 5	Brisbane Roar	2–3	Adelaide United	Sydney
17:00 AEDT	Jelacic 6'; O'Shea 43' (pen.)	Report	Mauk 33'; Clough 46'; Goodwin 62'	Stadium: Allianz Stadium; Attendance: 15,249; Referee: Alex King

30 November 2024 6	Macarthur FC	4–4	Brisbane Roar	Sydney
18:35 AEDT	Adamson 44'; Uskok 51'; De Silva 79'; Germain 83'	Report	Waddingham 5', 29'; Arslanagić 67' (o.g.); Uskok 90+3' (o.g.)	Stadium: Campbelltown Sports Stadium; Attendance: 3,312; Referee: Daniel Elder

6 December 2024 7	Brisbane Roar	1–4	Melbourne City	Brisbane
18:35 AEST	O'Shea 77' (pen.)	Report	Kuen 1'; Cohen 18', 70'; Ugarkovic 82'	Stadium: Suncorp Stadium; Attendance: 6,125; Referee: Sam Kelly

14 December 2024 8	Western Sydney Wanderers	2–2	Brisbane Roar	Sydney
19:35 AEDT	Borrello 10', 21'	Report	Cleur 13' (o.g.); Waddingham 31'	Stadium: CommBank Stadium; Attendance: 6,617; Referee: Daniel Elder

21 December 2024 9	Brisbane Roar	0–1	Perth Glory	Brisbane
16:00 AEST		Report	Williams 69'	Stadium: Suncorp Stadium; Attendance: 6,145; Referee: Nathan Shakespear

29 December 2024 10	Western United	1–0	Brisbane Roar	Melbourne
17:00 AEDT	Ibusuki 44' (pen.)	Report		Stadium: Ironbark Fields; Attendance: 4,187; Referee: Alex King

3 January 2025 12	Brisbane Roar	1–3	Central Coast Mariners	Brisbane
18:35 AEST	Halloran 71'	Report	Shour 11' (o.g.); Steele 81'; De Lima 90+5'	Stadium: Suncorp Stadium; Attendance: 6,122; Referee: Adam Kersey

7 January 2025 11	Brisbane Roar	0–1	Newcastle Jets	Brisbane
19:00 AEST		Report	Rose 71'	Stadium: Suncorp Stadium; Attendance: 4,821; Referee: Alireza Faghani

11 January 2025 13	Melbourne City	1–0	Brisbane Roar	Melbourne
17:00 AEDT	Mazzeo 65'	Report		Stadium: AAMI Park; Attendance: 4,683; Referee: Casey Reibelt

18 January 2025 15	Sydney FC	3–4	Brisbane Roar	Sydney
17:00 AEDT	King 32'; Quintal 84'; Courtney-Perkins 88'	Report	Halloran 16'; Hore 21'; Zimarino 41'; Herrington 72'	Stadium: Allianz Stadium; Attendance: 10,506; Referee: Tim Danaskos

31 January 2025 17	Brisbane Roar	0–1	Western Sydney Wanderers	Brisbane
18:35 AEST		Report	Kraev 8'	Stadium: Suncorp Stadium; Attendance: 6,183; Referee: Alex King

6 February 2025 18	Wellington Phoenix	1–1	Brisbane Roar	Wellington
17:00 NZDT	Hughes 61'	Report	Hore 71'	Stadium: Sky Stadium; Attendance: 9,084; Referee: Jack Morgan

21 February 2025 20	Newcastle Jets	3–1	Brisbane Roar	Newcastle
19:35 AEDT	Mizunuma 21'; Adams 38'; Taylor 50'	Report	O'Shea 43'	Stadium: McDonald Jones Stadium; Attendance: 5,461; Referee: Sam Kelly

1 March 2025 21	Brisbane Roar	1–1	Melbourne Victory	Brisbane
16:00 AEST	Hore 20'	Report	Bos 90+7'	Stadium: Suncorp Stadium; Attendance: 6,544; Referee: Nathan Shakespear

8 March 2025 22	Adelaide United	1–1	Brisbane Roar	Adelaide
16:30 ACDT	Crawford 45+3'	Report	Brazete 68'	Stadium: Coopers Stadium; Attendance: 8,082; Referee: Lachlan Keevers

15 March 2025 23	Perth Glory	1–3	Brisbane Roar	Perth
18:45 AWST	Amos 7'	Report	Abubakar 37'; Klein 51', 89'	Stadium: HBF Park; Attendance: 6,469; Referee: Casey Reibelt

30 March 2025 24	Brisbane Roar	0–2	Auckland FC	Brisbane
16:00 AEST		Report	Pijnaker 45+3'; Sakai 85'	Stadium: Suncorp Stadium; Attendance: 5,466; Referee: Alireza Faghani

4 April 2025 25	Brisbane Roar	1–5	Macarthur FC	Brisbane
18:35 AEST	Abubakar 28'	Report	Jakoliš 44', 55', 73'; Hollman 68'; Sawyer 90'	Stadium: Suncorp Stadium; Attendance: 3,899; Referee: Shaun Evans

11 April 2025 26	Melbourne City	3–2	Brisbane Roar	Melbourne
19:35 AEST	Tilio 57'; Caputo 61'; Ferreyra 85'	Report	Abubakar 9'; Jelacic 69'	Stadium: AAMI Park; Attendance: 6,052; Referee: Casey Reibelt

17 April 2025 27	Brisbane Roar	2–1	Western United	Brisbane
19:35 AEST	Klein 2'; Berenguer 24'	Report	Ibusuki 45'	Stadium: Suncorp Stadium; Attendance: 3,487; Referee: Lachlan Keevers

22 April 2025 16	Brisbane Roar	1–1	Adelaide United	Brisbane
19:00 AEST	Abubakar 59'	Report	Pierias 11'	Stadium: Suncorp Stadium; Attendance: 2,454; Referee: Casey Reibelt
Note: Originally scheduled for 25 January, the match was postponed due to a scheduling conflict with Luke Combs' performance at Suncorp Stadium.

26 April 2025 28	Brisbane Roar	1–0	Wellington Phoenix	Brisbane
15:00 AEST	Berenguer 58'	Report		Stadium: Suncorp Stadium; Attendance: Ben Abraham; Referee: 6,032

2 May 2025 29	Central Coast Mariners	1–2	Brisbane Roar	Gosford
19:35 AEST	De Lima 3'	Report	Klein 17', 50'	Stadium: Industree Group Stadium; Attendance: 3,287; Referee: Ben Abraham

=== Australia Cup ===
The playoff round for the 2024 Australia Cup was held during the pre-season.

23 July 2024 2024 Play-offs	Brisbane Roar	2–4	Perth Glory	Darwin
17:30 ACST	Jelacic 17'; Zimarino 90+3'	Report	Williams 38'; Faisal 52' (pen.), 58'; Blair 65'	Stadium: Larrakia Park; Attendance: 1,254; Referee: Ben Abraham

The playoff round for the 2025 Australia Cup was held just after the regular season.

14 May 2025 2025 Play-offs	Wellington Phoenix	1–0	Brisbane Roar	Darwin
19:00 ACST	Barbarouses 39'	Report		Stadium: Larrakia Park; Attendance: 1,813; Referee: Sam Kelly

== Statistics ==
=== Appearances and goals ===
Includes all competitions. Players with no appearances not included in the list.

As of 14 May 2025

No.	Pos	Nat	Player	Total		A-League Men		2024 Australia Cup		2025 Australia Cup play-off	
No.	Pos	Nat	Player	Apps	Goals	Apps	Goals	Apps	Goals	Apps	Goals
Goalkeepers
1	GK	(Australia) AUS	Macklin Freke	17	0	16	0	1	0	0	0
29	GK	(Australia) AUS	Matt Acton	11	0	10	0	0	0	1	0
Defenders
3	DF	(Australia) AUS	Corey Brown	8	0	3+4	0	1	0	0	0
4	DF	(Australia) AUS	Ben Warland	9	0	8	0	1	0	0	0
5	DF	(United States) USA	Marcus Ferkranus	1	0	0	0	1	0	0	0
6	DF	(Australia) AUS	Austin Ludwik	6	0	3+3	0	0	0	0	0
12	DF	(Australia) AUS	Lucas Herrington	18	1	15+2	1	0	0	1	0
14	DF	(Australia) AUS	Pearson Kasawaya	4	0	0+4	0	0	0	0	0
15	DF	(Australia) AUS	Hosine Bility	24	0	20+3	0	0	0	1	0
19	DF	(Sri Lanka) SRI	Jack Hingert	22	0	11+9	0	0+1	0	1	0
21	DF	(Australia) AUS	Antonee Burke-Gilroy	27	0	21+4	0	1	0	1	0
Midfielders
8	MF	(Lebanon) LBN	Walid Shour	21	0	12+8	0	0	0	0+1	0
10	MF	(France) FRA	Florin Berenguer	23	2	14+8	2	0	0	1	0
23	MF	(Australia) AUS	Keegan Jelacic	26	3	22+2	2	1	1	1	0
24	MF	(Australia) AUS	Samuel Klein	20	5	15+4	5	0	0	1	0
26	MF	(Republic of Ireland) IRL	Jay O'Shea	28	3	26	3	1	0	1	0
30	MF	(Australia) AUS	Quinn MacNicol	4	0	0+3	0	0+1	0	0	0
35	MF	(Australia) AUS	Louis Zabala	22	0	14+7	0	0+1	0	0	0
47	MF	(Australia) AUS	James Durrington	1	0	0+1	0	0	0	0	0
Forwards
7	FW	(Indonesia) IDN	Rafael Struick	10	1	2+8	1	0	0	0	0
11	FW	(Portugal) POR	Asumah Abubakar	12	4	10+1	4	0	0	1	0
13	FW	(Australia) AUS	Henry Hore	13	3	10+2	3	0	0	1	0
17	FW	(Australia) AUS	Nathan Amanatidis	9	0	3+6	0	0	0	0	0
18	FW	(Australia) AUS	Jacob Brazete	22	1	6+15	1	0	0	0+1	0
27	FW	(Australia) AUS	Ben Halloran	25	2	17+6	2	1	0	0+1	0
43	FW	(Australia) AUS	Adam Zimarino	20	2	5+13	1	0+1	1	0+1	0
49	FW	(Australia) AUS	Ivan Ozzi	1	0	0+1	0	0	0	0	0
Player(s) transferred out but featured this season
2	DF	(Australia) AUS	Scott Neville	4	0	2+2	0	0	0	0	0
6	MF	(Australia) AUS	Joe Caletti	3	0	2	0	1	0	0	0
11	FW	(Ecuador) ECU	Néicer Acosta	5	0	1+4	0	0	0	0	0
16	FW	(Australia) AUS	Thomas Waddingham	12	4	10+1	4	1	0	0	0
17	DF	(Australia) AUS	Harry Van der Saag	11	0	7+3	0	1	0	0	0
22	FW	(Australia) AUS	Alex Parsons	1	0	0	0	0+1	0	0	0

=== Disciplinary record ===
Includes all competitions. The list is sorted by squad number when total cards are equal. Players with no cards not included in the list.

As of 14 May 2025

Rank	No.	Pos.	Nat.	Name	A-League Men			2024 Australia Cup			2025 Australia Cup play-off			Total							
Rank	No.	Pos.	Nat.	Name	Booked	(yellow card) (yellow-red card)	Sent off (straight red)	Booked	(yellow card) (yellow-red card)	Sent off (straight red)	Booked	(yellow card) (yellow-red card)	Sent off (straight red)	Booked	(yellow card) (yellow-red card)	Sent off (straight red)					
Rank	No.	Pos.	Nat.	Name	1	3	DF	(Australia)	Corey Brown	2	0	0	0	0	1	0	0	0	2	0	1
2	15	DF	(Australia)	Hosine Bility	5	1	0	0	0	0	1	0	0	6	1	0					
3	19	DF	(Sri Lanka)	Jack Hingert	5	0	0	0	0	0	1	0	0	6	0	0					
4	23	MF	(Australia)	Keegan Jelacic	5	0	0	0	0	0	0	0	0	5	0	0					
4	26	MF	(Republic of Ireland)	Jay O'Shea	4	0	0	0	0	0	1	0	0	5	0	0					
6	8	MF	(Lebanon)	Walid Shour	4	0	0	0	0	0	0	0	0	4	0	0					
6	27	FW	(Australia)	Ben Halloran	4	0	0	0	0	0	0	0	0	4	0	0					
6	43	FW	(Australia)	Adam Zimarino	3	0	0	1	0	0	0	0	0	4	0	0					
9	13	FW	(Australia)	Henry Hore	3	0	0	0	0	0	0	0	0	3	0	0					
9	24	MF	(Australia)	Samuel Klein	2	0	0	0	0	0	1	0	0	3	0	0					
11	4	DF	(Australia)	Ben Warland	2	0	0	0	0	0	0	0	0	2	0	0					
11	11	FW	(Portugal)	Asumah Abubakar	2	0	0	0	0	0	0	0	0	2	0	0					
11	12	DF	(Australia)	Lucas Herrington	2	0	0	0	0	0	0	0	0	2	0	0					
11	29	GK	(Australia)	Matt Acton	2	0	0	0	0	0	0	0	0	2	0	0					
11	35	DF	(Australia)	Louis Zabala	2	0	0	0	0	0	0	0	0	2	0	0					
16	1	GK	(Australia)	Macklin Freke	1	0	0	0	0	0	0	0	0	1	0	0					
16	6	DF	(Australia)	Austin Ludwik	1	0	0	0	0	0	0	0	0	1	0	0					
16	21	DF	(Australia)	Antonee Burke-Gilroy	1	0	0	0	0	0	0	0	0	1	0	0					
Player(s) transferred out but featured this season
1	17	DF	(Australia)	Harry Van der Saag	4	0	0	1	0	0	0	0	0	5	0	0					
Total					54	1	0	2	0	1	4	0	0	60	1	1					

=== Clean sheets ===
Includes all competitions. The list is sorted by squad number when total clean sheets are equal. Numbers in parentheses represent games where both goalkeepers participated and both kept a clean sheet; the number in parentheses is awarded to the goalkeeper who was substituted on, whilst a full clean sheet is awarded to the goalkeeper who was on the field at the start of play. Goalkeepers with no clean sheets not included in the list.

As of 14 May 2025

Rank	No.	Nat.	Goalkeeper	A-League Men	2024 Australia Cup	2025 Australia Cup play-off	Total
1	29	(Australia)	Matt Acton	1	0	0	1
Total				1	0	0	1
