= Africa Cup =

Africa Cup may refer to:

== Association football ==
- Africa Cup of Nations, an international men's football competition
- Women's Africa Cup of Nations, an international women's football competition
- African Nations Championship, an African football tournament for local national teams organized by the Confederation of African Football since 2009
- African Nations Cup of South Australia, an annual football tournament for African Australian players held in Adelaide, Australia

== Field hockey ==
- Indoor Africa Cup, formerly known as the Indoor Africa Cup of Nations, an international indoor hockey tournament
- Men's Hockey Africa Cup of Nations, an international men's hockey tournament
- Men's Junior Africa Cup, formerly known as the Junior Africa Cup of Nations, a men's international under-21 hockey tournament
- Women's Hockey Africa Cup of Nations, an international women's hockey tournament
- Women's Junior Africa Cup, formerly known as the Junior Africa Cup of Nations, a women's international under-21 hockey tournament

== Rugby union ==
- Rugby Africa Cup, a two-year men's rugby tournament
- Rugby Africa Women's Cup, a two-year women's rugby tournament
