= Lucas Herrington =

Australian soccer player (born 2007)

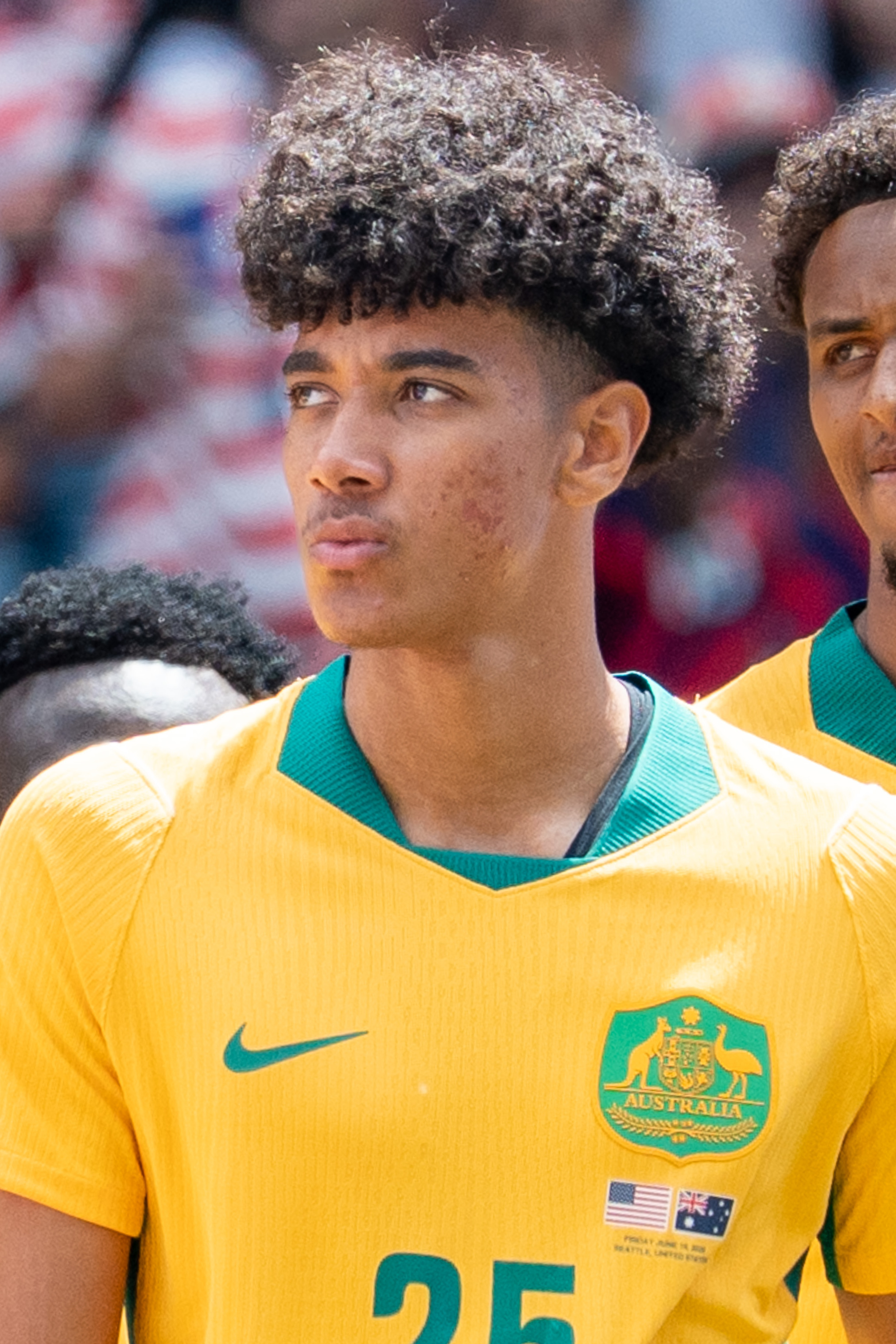
- Herrington with Australia in 2026

Personal information
- Date of birth: 5 September 2007 (age 19)
- Place of birth: Brisbane, Queensland, Australia
- Height: 1.92 m (6 ft 4 in)
- Position: Central defender

Team information
- Current team: Hull City
- Number: 22

Youth career
- Taringa Rovers
- Toowong
- Brisbane City
- 2019–2023: Brisbane Roar

Senior career*
Years	Team	Apps	(Gls)
2023	Brisbane Roar NPL	4	(0)
2024–2026	Brisbane Roar	28	(2)
2026	Colorado Rapids	18	(1)
2026–	Hull City	8	(0)

International career^{‡}
2024–	Australia U20	15	(0)
2026–	Australia	9	(0)
- * Club domestic league appearances and goals as of 14 November 2026 ‡ National team caps and goals as of 14 November 2026

Lucas Herrington (born 5 September 2007) is an Australian professional soccer player who plays as a central defender for Premier League club Hull City and the Australia national team.

== Club career ==
=== Brisbane Roar ===
Herrington is a product of the youth systems of Taringa Rovers, Toowong FC and Brisbane City FC, before joining the academy of Brisbane Roar in 2019, where he completed his development. In 2023, he featured for the club’s reserve side, Brisbane Roar Youth.

On 9 September 2024, he signed a three-year scholarship contract with the Roar. He made his senior and professional debut as a starter in a 2–2 A-League Men draw against Western Sydney Wanderers on 14 December 2024. On 28 January 2025, Herrington scored his first goal for Brisbane in a 4–3 win over Sydney FC. He made 17 appearances during his first professional season.

Herrington made his first appearance of the 2025–26 season as a substitute following a red card to Dimitri Valkanis, seeing out a 1–0 win against Macarthur. He went on to make a further 10 appearances, scoring once in a 3–0 win over Newcastle Jets and keeping six clean sheets.

He played his final match for Brisbane Roar on 3 January 2026, starting in a 3–0 defeat to Wellington Phoenix at Kayo Stadium. Herrington made 29 senior appearances for the Roar across all competitions, departing for a club record fee. It was later reported that Brisbane Roar had negotiated a 20% sell-on clause as part of the agreement. In July 2026, Colorado reportedly paid Brisbane Roar A$560,000 to buy out the clause.

=== Colorado Rapids ===
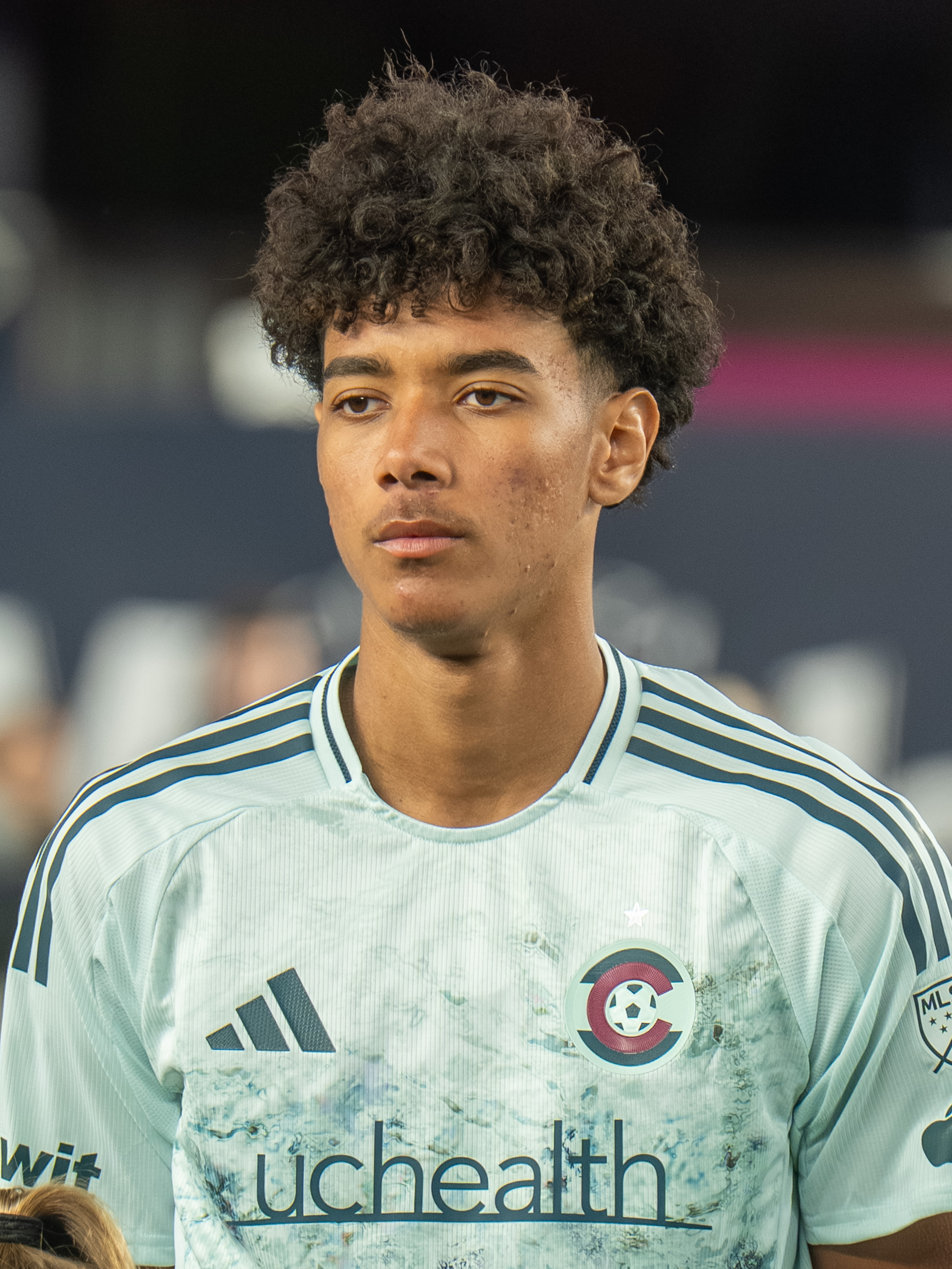
Herrington with Colorado Rapids in 2026

On 13 August 2025, Herrington agreed to join Major League Soccer side Colorado Rapids ahead of the 2026 season, with the transfer set to be completed in January 2026. He signed a contract running until 2029, with a club option for an additional year.

On 22 February 2026, Herrington made his Major League Soccer debut for the Rapids in the opening round of the season, playing the full 90 minutes in a 2–0 loss to Seattle Sounders. A week later, on 28 February, he started in a 2–0 win over the Portland Timbers, keeping his first clean sheet and scoring his first goal for the club.

Following a successful 2026 FIFA World Cup campaign, Herrington was named in the MLS All-Star squad for the 2026 MLS All-Star Game. On 29 July, Herrington started and played the first half as the MLS All-Stars defeated the Liga MX All-Stars 4–3. He was the Rapids' only representative in the squad.

On 1 August, Herrington made his final appearance for the Rapids, playing the full 90 minutes and keeping a clean sheet in a 1–0 win over Austin FC. His transfer broke the club's record fee, with the Rapids retaining a percentage of Herrington's future sell-on rights. It also reported to be the highest transfer fee paid for a defender in MLS history.

=== Hull City ===
On 12 August 2026, Herrington joined newly promoted Premier League club Hull City on a five-year contract for an undisclosed fee, reported to be around £17 million. The transfer made him the most expensive Australian footballer, surpassing the previous record held by Harry Souttar. On 22 August, Herrington made his debut, coming on as a substitute for Nobel Mendy in a 2–0 win over Manchester United at the MKM Stadium. Herrington made his full debut for the club on 25 August, starting in a 1–1 draw with Stoke City in the EFL Cup at the Bet365 Stadium, before Hull City won the match on penalties.

== International career ==
Herrington was able to represent four countries: Australia, Finland, Germany and Zimbabwe. He chose to represent his country of birth, Australia.

Herrington was part of the Australia U19s who came third at the 2024 ASEAN U-19 Boys Championship. The following year, he was part of the Australia U20s who won the 2025 AFC U-20 Asian Cup.

He was called up in May 2025 for the Australia men's national under-18 soccer team, to take part in the 2025 UEFA Friendship Cup commencing in early June.

Herrington earned his maiden call-up to the Australia national team for the FIFA Series, where the Socceroos were scheduled to face Cameroon and Curaçao. He debuted for the Socceroos against Cameroon, playing all 90 minutes, and played the first half against Curaçao, starting in both matches.

On 31 May 2026, Herrington was selected in the 26-man squad for the 2026 FIFA World Cup, and became Australia's youngest ever World Cup starter in the group stage match against Paraguay after sitting on the bench against Turkey and the United States. In their round of 32 knockout match against Egypt, Herrington was selected to take the final penalty shot for Australia, which went just over the crossbar; Egypt won on their next kick to knock Australia out of the tournament, 1(4)–1(2).

== Personal life ==
Herrington was born in Brisbane, Queensland, and attended the Anglican Church Grammar School. He is of Finnish, German and Zimbabwean descent. His older brother, Diesel Herrington, is also a professional soccer player.

== Career statistics ==
=== Club ===
As of match played 11 November 2026

Appearances and goals by club, season and competition
Club	Season	League			National cup (Note: Includes appearance(s) in the Australia Cup, U.S. Open Cup)		League cup (Note: Includes appearance(s) in the EFL Cup)		Continental		Total	
Club	Season	Division	Apps	Goals	Apps	Goals	Apps	Goals	Apps	Goals	Apps	Goals
Brisbane Roar Youth	2023	NPL Queensland	4	0	—		—		—		4	0
Brisbane Roar	2024–25	A-League Men	17	1	0	0	—		—		17	1
Brisbane Roar	2025–26	A-League Men	11	1	1	0	—		—		12	1
Brisbane Roar	Total		32	2	1	0	—		—		33	2
Colorado Rapids	2026	Major League Soccer	18	1	2	0	—		—		20	1
Hull City	2026–27	Premier League	8	0	0	0	2	0	—		10	0
Career total			58	3	3	0	2	0	0	0	63	3

=== International ===
As of match played 3 July 2026

Appearances and goals by national team and year
National team	Year	Apps	Goals
Australia	2026	6	0
Total		6	0

== Honours ==
Australia U20

- AFC U-20 Asian Cup: 2025

Individual

- MLS All-Star: 2026
- Harry Kewell Medal: 2025–26
