= 2026–27 Brisbane Roar FC (women) season =

Brisbane Roar (women)
2026–27 season
- Chairman: Kaz Patafta
- Head Coach: Johnathan Clemente
- Stadium: Imperial Corp Stadium
- A-League Women: TBD
Home colours	Away colours	Third colours
- All statistics correct as of 25 June 2026.

The 2026–27 season is Brisbane Roar Football Club (women)'s 19th season in the A-League Women.

In pre-season, coach Alex Smith who had led the team on a record-breaking season, departed the club to join American USL Super League club Brooklyn FC. A month later, the club announced signing Johnathan Clemente as coach, making him the youngest coach in the history of the A-Leagues.

== Players ==
=== First-team squad ===
As of 16 September 2026

Note: Flags indicate national team as defined under FIFA eligibility rules; some limited exceptions apply. Players may hold more than one non-FIFA nationality.

No.	Pos.	Nation	Player
1	GK	AUS	Chloe Lincoln
2	DF	AUS	Annabel Martin
3	FW	AUS	Daisy Brown (scholarship)
4	FW	AUS	Kijah Stephenson
5	DF	AUS	Isabel Hodgson
6	DF	AUS	Ruby Cuthbert
7	FW	USA	Murphy Agnew
8	DF	USA	Josie Studer
10	FW	AUS	Grace Kuilamu
11	FW	AUS	Sharn Freier
12	GK	AUS	Tahlia Franco

No.	Pos.	Nation	Player
14	MF	AUS	Zara Kruger
15	DF	PHI	Hali Long
16	FW	USA	Abby Smothers
17	FW	AUS	Maja Markovski
18	DF	AUS	Amali Kinsella (scholarship)
19	MF	AUS	Lily Punch
21	MF	PHI	Katrina Guillou
22	DF	AUS	Natalie Tathem (captain)
23	DF	AUS	Isabela Hoyos (scholarship)
24	MF	AUS	Emily Roach
27	MF	AUS	Rosie Curtis

== Transfers ==
=== Transfers in ===
No.	Position	Player	From	Type/fee	Contract length	Date	Ref
5	DF	Isabel Hodgson	Unattached	Free transfer		26 August 2026	
21	MF	(Philippines) Katrina Guillou	Unattached	Free transfer	1 year	27 August 2026	
16	FW	(United States) Abby Smothers	Unattached	Free transfer	1 year	28 August 2026	
27	MF	Rosie Curtis	Melbourne Victory	Free transfer	1 year	29 August 2026	
22	DF	Natalie Tathem	Unattached	Free transfer	1 year	30 August 2026	
2	DF	Annabel Martin	Central Coast Mariners	Free transfer	1 year	1 September 2026	
7	FW	(United States) Murphy Agnew	Unattached	Free transfer	1 year	2 September 2026	
15	DF	(Philippines) Hali Long	Unattached	Free transfer	1 year	9 September 2026	
19	MF	Lily Punch	(Australia) Queensland Academy of Sport	Free transfer	1 year	10 September 2026	
17	FW	Maja Markovski	Unattached	Free transfer	1 year	15 September 2026	
24	MF	Emily Roach	Unattached	Free transfer	1 year	16 September 2026	

=== Transfers out ===
No.	Position	Player	Transferred to	Type/fee	Date	Ref
17	FW	(Netherlands) Bente Jansen	(Netherlands) De Graafschap	End of contract	22 May 2026	
22	DF	Ava Piazza	Unattached	End of contract	22 May 2026	
47	FW	Kyla Hanson	(Australia) Eastern Suburbs	End of contract	22 May 2026	
11	DF	(United States) Marianna Seidl	(Spain) Eibar	End of contract	27 July 2026	
27	FW	(United States) Ashlyn Miller	(United States) Brooklyn FC	End of contract	31 July 2026	
13	MF	Tameka Yallop	Wellington Phoenix	End of contract	11 August 2026	
5	DF	Aimee Medwin	Melbourne City	End of contract	19 August 2026	
15	MF	Kiera Meyers	Unattached	End of contract	19 August 2026	
5	MF	Alicia Woods	Unattached	End of contract	19 August 2026	
7	MF	(Japan) Momo Hayashi	Melbourne City	End of contract	27 August 2026	
2	DF	(Philippines) Angela Beard	Unattached	End of contract	7 September 2026	

=== Contract extensions ===
No.	Player	Position	Duration	Date	Note
10	Grace Kuilamu	Forward	1 year	21 August 2026	
14	Zara Kruger	Midfielder	1 year	22 August 2026	
11	Sharn Freier	Forward	1 year	23 August 2026	Loan turned permanent
8	(United States) Josie Studer	Defender	1 year	25 August 2026	
4	Kijah Stephenson	Forward	1 year	7 September 2026	
1	Chloe Lincoln	Goalkeeper		16 October 2026	

== Pre-season and friendlies ==
2 October 2026 Mitre Festival of Football	Queensland XI (Australia)	1–2	(Australia) Brisbane Roar	Sunshine Coast, Australia
19:30 AEST	Hugo 8'	Report	Brown 67'; Phillips 86' (o.g.)	Stadium: Sunshine Coast Stadium

== Competitions ==
=== Overall record ===
Competition	First match	Last match	Record							
Competition	First match	Last match	Pld	W	D	L	GF	GA	GD	Win %
A-League Women	17 October 2026	TBD	6	2	0	4	6	9	−3	33.33
Total			6	2	0	4	6	9	−3	33.33

Last updated: 21 November 2026
Source: Competitions

=== A-League Women ===
==== League table ====
Pos	Team	Pld	W	D	L	GF	GA	GD	Pts	Qualification
6	Melbourne City	4	2	1	1	8	3	+5	7	Qualification for Finals series
7	Western Sydney Wanderers	4	2	0	2	5	4	+1	6	
8	Brisbane Roar	6	2	0	4	6	9	−3	6	
9	Sydney FC	5	1	1	3	5	13	−8	4	
10	Adelaide United	5	0	3	2	3	7	−4	3	

Updated to match(es) played on 21 November 2026. Source: A-Leagues
Rules for classification: 1) points; 2) goal difference; 3) goals scored; 4) wins; 5) head-to-head results; 5a) head-to-head points; 5b) head-to-head goal difference; 6) Fair Play points; 7) away goal difference; 8) away goals per match; 9) home goal difference; 10) home goals per match; 11) toss of a coin in an event of a tie of two clubs.

==== Results summary ====
Overall								Home						Away					
Pld	W	D	L	GF	GA	GD	Pts	W	D	L	GF	GA	GD	W	D	L	GF	GA	GD
6	2	0	4	6	9	−3	6	2	0	2	5	5	0	0	0	2	1	4	−3

Last updated: 21 November 2026.
Source: A-Leagues

==== Results by round ====
Round	1	2	3	4	5	6	7	8	9	10	11	12	13	14	15	16	17	18	19	20	21	22
Ground	H	A	H	H	A	H	A	A	H	A	B	H	A	A	H	A	H	A	H	A	B	H
Result	L	L	L	W	L	W					B										B	
Position	11	10	11	8	9	8																
Points	0	0	0	3	3	6																

Updated to match(es) played on 21 November 2026. Source: A-Leagues
A = Away; H = Home; B = Bye; W = Win; D = Draw; L = Loss; P = Postponed

==== Matches ====
Win Draw Loss Fixtures

17 October 2026 1	Brisbane Roar	2–4	Central Coast Mariners	Brisbane
16:00 AEST	Brown 26'; Guillou 77'	Report	Trimis 7'; Kapetanellis 44'; Halmarick 59'; Witz 75'	Stadium: Spencer Park; Attendance: 1,018; Referee: Isabella Mossin

24 October 2026 2	Western Sydney Wanderers	3–1	Brisbane Roar	Sydney
14:15 AEDT	Palywoda 15'; Younis 66' (pen.); Miller 80'	Report	Sakalis 7' (o.g.)	Stadium: CommBank Stadium; Attendance: 1,824; Referee: Charles Hollings

31 October 2026 3	Brisbane Roar	0–1	Sydney FC	Brisbane
14:00 AEST		Report	Webber 66'	Stadium: Gioca Stadium; Attendance: 885; Referee: Bec Mackie

7 November 2026 4	Brisbane Roar	2–0	Melbourne Victory	Brisbane
14:00 AEST	Agnew 36'; Markovski 45+2'	Report		Stadium: Gioca Stadium; Attendance: 936; Referee: Mikayla Ryan

15 November 2026 5	Canberra United	1–0	Brisbane Roar	Canberra
15:00 AEDT	Dale 17'	Report		Stadium: McKellar Park; Referee: Bec Mackie

21 November 2026 6	Brisbane Roar	1–0	Melbourne City	Brisbane
15:50 AEST	Roach 48'	Report		Stadium: Kayo Stadium; Attendance: 2,402; Referee: Caitlin Williams

13 December 2026 7	Central Coast Mariners	v	Brisbane Roar	Gosford
17:00 AEDT				Stadium: polytech Stadium

20 December 2026 8	Wellington Phoenix	v	Brisbane Roar	Porirua
15:00 NZDT				Stadium: Jerry Collins Stadium

30 December 2026 9	Brisbane Roar	v	Perth Glory	Brisbane
15:50 AEST		Report		Stadium: Kayo Stadium

2 January 2027 10	Sydney FC	v	Brisbane Roar	Sydney
16:50 AEDT		Report		Stadium: Allianz Stadium

17 January 2027 12	Brisbane Roar	v	Adelaide United	Brisbane
16:00 AEST				Stadium: Gioca Stadium

24 January 2027 13	Newcastle Jets	v	Brisbane Roar	Maitland
17:00 AEDT		Report		Stadium: Maitland Sports Ground

30 January 2027 14	Melbourne Victory	v	Brisbane Roar	Melbourne
17:00 AEDT				Stadium: Home of the Matildas

6 February 2027 15	Brisbane Roar	v	Canberra United	Brisbane
17:00 AEST				Stadium: Gioca Stadium

13 February 2027 16	Perth Glory	v	Brisbane Roar	Perth
17:00 AWST		Report		Stadium: Sam Kerr Football Centre

20 February 2027 17	Brisbane Roar	v	Western Sydney Wanderers	Brisbane
17:00 AEST				Stadium: Gioca Stadium

13 March 2027 18	Melbourne City	v	Brisbane Roar	Melbourne
15:00 AEDT		Report		Stadium: ctrl:cyber Pitch

19 March 2027 19	Brisbane Roar	v	Wellington Phoenix	Brisbane
18:00 AEST				Stadium: Gioca Stadium

13 March 2027 20	Adelaide United	v	Brisbane Roar	Adelaide
15:00 AEDT				Stadium: Service FM Stadium

19 March 2027 22	Brisbane Roar	v	Newcastle Jets	Brisbane
17:00 AEST		Report		Stadium: Gioca Stadium

== Statistics ==
=== Appearances and goals ===
Players with no appearances are not included in the list.

As of match played 17 October 2026

No.	Pos	Nat	Player	Total		A-League Women	
No.	Pos	Nat	Player	Apps	Goals	Apps	Goals
1	GK	(Australia) AUS	Chloe Lincoln	3	0	3	0
2	DF	(Australia) AUS	Annabel Martin	4	0	3+1	0
3	FW	(Australia) AUS	Daisy Brown	4	1	3+1	1
4	MF	(Australia) AUS	Kijah Stephenson	4	0	1+3	0
5	DF	(Australia) AUS	Isabel Hodgson	3	0	2+1	0
7	FW	(United States) USA	Murphy Agnew	4	1	4	1
8	DF	(United States) USA	Josie Studer	1	0	1	0
12	GK	(Australia) AUS	Talia Franco	1	0	1	0
14	MF	(Australia) AUS	Zara Kruger	4	0	4	0
15	DF	(Philippines) PHI	Hali Long	4	0	3+1	0
16	FW	(United States) USA	Abigail Smothers	4	0	3+1	0
16	FW	(Australia) AUS	Maja Markovski	4	1	1+3	1
19	FW	(Australia) AUS	Lily Punch	4	0	1+3	0
21	MF	(Philippines) PHI	Katrina Guillou	4	1	3+1	1
22	DF	(Australia) AUS	Natalie Tathem	4	0	3+1	0
24	MF	(Australia) AUS	Emily Roach	4	0	2+2	0
27	MF	(Australia) AUS	Rosie Curtis	4	0	4	0

- Source: Soccerway

=== Clean sheets ===
Includes all competitions. The list is sorted by squad number when total clean sheets are equal. Numbers in parentheses represent games where both goalkeepers participated and both kept a clean sheet; the number in parentheses is awarded to the goalkeeper who was substituted on, whilst a full clean sheet is awarded to the goalkeeper who was on the field at the start of play. Goalkeepers with no clean sheets not included in the list.

As of match played 7 November 2026

Rank	No.	Nat.	Goalkeeper	A-League Women	Total
1	1	(Australia)	Chloe Lincoln	1	1

== See also ==
- 2026–27 Brisbane Roar FC season
