= Jay O'Shea =

Irish footballer (born 1988)

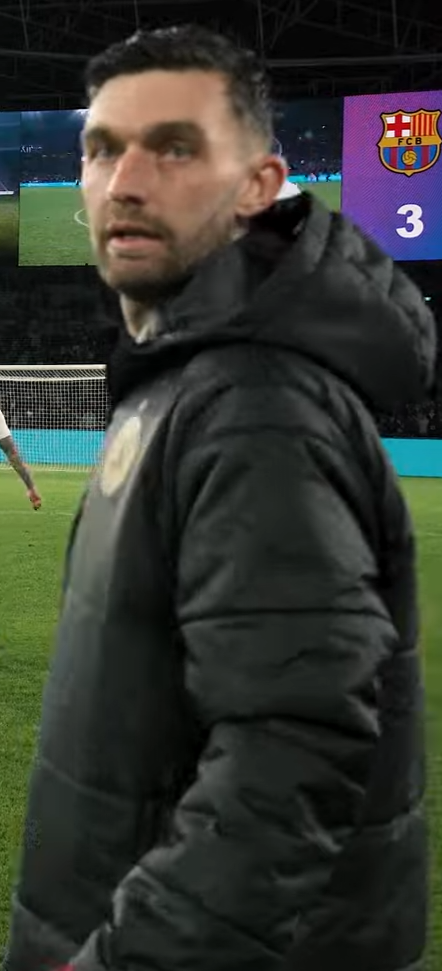
- O'Shea in 2022

Personal information
- Full name: James O'Shea
- Date of birth: 10 August 1988 (age 38)
- Place of birth: Dublin, Ireland
- Height: 6 ft 0 in (1.83 m)
- Position: Attacking midfielder

Team information
- Current team: Perth Glory
- Number: 8

Youth career
- 2004–2005: St Joseph's Boys

Senior career*
| Years | Team | Apps | (Gls) |
| 2006 | Home Farm | 2 | (0) |
| 2006–2007 | Bray Wanderers | 35 | (2) |
| 2008–2009 | Galway United | 48 | (11) |
| 2009–2011 | Birmingham City | 1 | (0) |
| 2010 | → Middlesbrough (loan) | 2 | (0) |
| 2010–2011 | → Stevenage (loan) | 5 | (0) |
| 2011 | → Port Vale (loan) | 5 | (1) |
| 2011–2013 | Milton Keynes Dons | 39 | (6) |
| 2012–2013 | → Chesterfield (loan) | 7 | (2) |
| 2013–2017 | Chesterfield | 173 | (36) |
| 2017 | → Sheffield United (loan) | 10 | (3) |
| 2017–2019 | Bury | 71 | (19) |
| 2019–2026 | Brisbane Roar | 177 | (29) |
| 2026– | Perth Glory | 0 | (0) |

International career
| 2006–2007 | Republic of Ireland U19 | 5 | (2) |
| 2008–2009 | Republic of Ireland U21 | 6 | (1) |
| 2008 | Republic of Ireland U23 | 1 | (0) |
- * Club domestic league appearances and goals as of 4:35, 22 October 2026 (UTC)

James O'Shea (/oʊˈʃeɪ/ oh-SHAY; born 10 August 1988) is an Irish professional footballer who plays as an attacking midfielder for A-League Men club Perth Glory.

While he is primarily an attacking midfielder, he can also operate as a winger and striker. O'Shea began his career with St Joseph's Boys AFC before moving on to play for Home Farm of the Leinster Senior League in 2005. He signed for Bray Wanderers after just two appearances for Home Farm and spent a year and a half with Bray. In 2008, O'Shea signed for Galway United, playing 60 games for the club in all competitions, and attracted a lot of interest from English Football League and Premier League teams.

He subsequently joined Birmingham City in August 2009 for an undisclosed fee and made his Premier League debut shortly after against Manchester United. However, he found first-team opportunities hard to come by during his first season at Birmingham and was loaned out to Middlesbrough in March 2010. O'Shea was loaned out again in October 2010, this time to League Two side Stevenage where he spent two months, and then to Port Vale in January 2011. He was released when his contract expired at the end of the 2010–11 season and joined Milton Keynes Dons. He joined Chesterfield on loan in November 2012 and joined the club permanently two months later. He played for Chesterfield in the 2014 Football League Trophy final before helping them to win the League Two title in 2013–14. He was loaned out to Sheffield United in January 2017 and helped United to win the League One title in 2016–17. He signed with Bury in July 2017 and was named on the PFA Team of the Year as Bury secured promotion out of League Two at the end of the 2018–19 season. He moved to Australia in June 2019 to sign with A-League club Brisbane Roar. He was named in the PFA A-League Team of the Season in 2020–21 and 2022–23, and on the A-Leagues All Star in 2022. Following seven years in Brisbane, he joined Perth Glory in October 2026.

== Club career ==
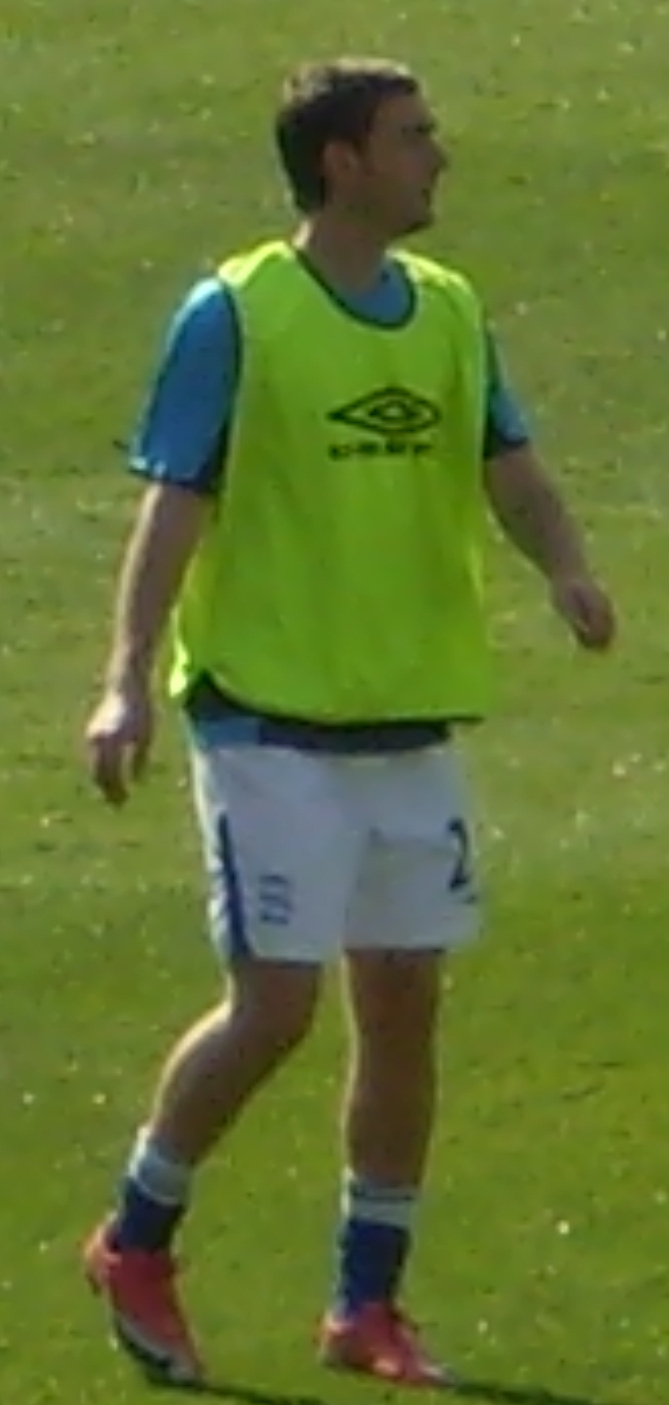
O'Shea warming up for Birmingham City in 2009

=== Bray and Galway ===
O'Shea began his career at St Joseph's Boys, a youth team located in south County Dublin that caters for players from the age of six up to 18 years old. Shortly after leaving St Joseph's, he signed for Home Farm of the Leinster Senior League in 2005, before joining Bray Wanderers a year later. O'Shea made his Bray debut in the club's 2–0 home defeat to Longford Town in September 2006 at the age of 18, coming on as a substitute in the second-half, and started his first match in a 6–0 loss to Cork City. He scored his first professional goal in a 3–0 win over Shamrock Rovers in October 2007, before signing for League of Ireland Premier Division side Galway United in December 2007. O'Shea scored his first goal for Galway in a 2–2 home draw with Finn Harps in May 2008, and finished as Galway's top scorer during the 2008 season, scoring ten goals in all competitions.

In November 2008, it was rumoured that a £400,000 deal had been agreed between Galway and English Championship side Derby County, with the player expected to move when the transfer window reopened in January 2009. O'Shea went on trial with the club in November 2008 and scored twice in a behind closed doors friendly against Notts County in a match which an experienced Derby side won 5–2. However, when Derby manager Paul Jewell resigned the move was put on hold and then cancelled. Carlisle United manager Greg Abbott said the club also came "within minutes" of signing O'Shea ahead of the 2009–10 season, but lost out after trying to sign the player for three months. In January 2009, O'Shea spent two weeks on trial with Birmingham City but returned to Galway ahead of the club's league campaign. The 2009 season witnessed O'Shea score six goals in 23 appearances for Galway, as well as captaining the team throughout the campaign. His final game for the club was a 2–1 win over his former employers, Bray Wanderers, a game in which he scored the winner in injury time. In his last two games for Galway, O'Shea was watched by scouts from Portsmouth, Derby County, Birmingham City, Middlesbrough, Watford, and Falkirk respectively.

=== Birmingham City ===
On 10 August 2009, O'Shea signed a two-year contract, with the option of a further two years, with Birmingham City of the Premier League. The fee was undisclosed. He made his debut for the club as a second-half substitute in Birmingham's opening match of the season, a 1–0 defeat at Manchester United. He started his first game for Birmingham nine days later, playing 45 minutes in the club's 2–1 League Cup win over Southampton. He also featured in the following round, this time playing 63 minutes in Birmingham's 2–0 away loss at Sunderland before being replaced by Lee Bowyer. It was to be O'Shea's last appearance of the season for Birmingham. In March 2010, O'Shea joined Middlesbrough on loan for a month. He made his debut – both for the club and in the English Football League – as a second-half substitute in a 1–1 draw at home to Crystal Palace on 3 April. He started the next game, away at Plymouth Argyle, but made no more first-team appearances.

Early in the 2010–11 season, Birmingham manager Alex McLeish attempted to find a Football League club for O'Shea to join on loan so that he could play regular football. In October, he had a trial with Scunthorpe United, during which he played for the club's reserve team in a game against Lincoln City reserves which ended 1–1. Scunthorpe manager Ian Baraclough said he "wanted to take a further look at O'Shea" ahead of a reserve game against Leeds United, but he did not feature in the match. Towards the end of October, McLeish expressed surprise and concern that no club had taken the player on loan: "I'm surprised nobody has come for him because I think he's a decent young player and it would be great to get him that league experience. Playing in reserve games every now and then is probably not the right thing for a young player with potential." On 26 October, O'Shea joined League Two club Stevenage on a one-month loan deal. He was assigned the number 22 shirt. Having scored in a reserve match against Ipswich Town the day after signing, O'Shea started in Stevenage's 0–0 home draw with Chesterfield on 30 October. After six appearances, four in the League and two in the FA Cup, O'Shea's loan was extended until 16 January 2011.

He returned to Birmingham at the end of his loan spell, and a few days later, he went out on loan again, this time to League Two club Port Vale for one month. He scored his first goal in English football at Vale Park, with a well taken strike against Rotherham United on 1 February. He made a total of five starts during his loan spell, before returning to Birmingham. Later in the season Vale's caretaker manager Mark Grew attempted to re-sign O'Shea. However, the deal was reported to have fallen through because of the player's wages. After Birmingham's relegation from the Premier League, O'Shea was one of several players released when their contracts expired at the end of the season.

=== Milton Keynes Dons ===
In July 2011, O'Shea spent some weeks on trial at League One club Milton Keynes Dons, before impressing manager Karl Robinson enough to win a one-year contract with an option for a second year. He scored his first goal at Stadium mk on 20 August, converting a late penalty to make it a 6–2 victory over Chesterfield. His second goal for the club came in a 6–0 beating of non-League Nantwich Town in the FA Cup. He opened the scoring on 24 January 2012 for his third goal of the season, though home side Stevenage then came from behind to beat the Dons 4–2.

=== Chesterfield ===
In November 2012, O'Shea joined League Two club Chesterfield on loan until 5 January 2013. He scored on his debut, in a 2–0 win over former club Port Vale at Vale Park. After his loan spell expired, he left MK Dons by mutual consent and signed an 18-month contract with Chesterfield. He scored five goals in 19 games in the remainder of the 2012–13 season.

He was named on the Football League Team of the Week after scoring two late goals to secure a 3–1 win at home to Torquay United on 15 February 2014. The following month he played at Wembley Stadium in Chesterfield's 3–1 defeat to Peterborough United in the final of the Football League Trophy. He was included in the Football League Team of the Week for a second time that season after scoring a second-half brace to confirm the 2–0 win at Burton Albion that sealed an automatic promotion place. He scored a total of nine goals in 47 games as the "Spireites" won promotion as divisional champions in 2013–14 and dedicated the title success to a recently deceased friend. He scored seven goals in 41 League One games in the 2014–15 campaign to help Chesterfield to reach the play-off places, where they were beaten by Preston North End at the semi-final stage. He scored nine goals in 51 appearances in the 2015–16 season and was named on the Football League Team of the Week three times: firstly for his brace in a 2–0 win at Millwall on 29 August, secondly for his performance in a 3–2 win over Rochdale on 9 January, and finally for scoring a goal and claiming two goals in a 3–0 win over Bury in the penultimate game of the season.

He was named as EFL League One Player of the Month for November 2016 after scoring four goals and providing two assists, including a brace against Bristol Rovers that won him a place on the EFL Team of the Week. On 24 January 2017, O'Shea joined League One rivals Sheffield United on loan to the end of the 2016–17 season. He scored three goals in ten appearances to help the "Blades" win promotion as champions and was hopeful that manager Chris Wilder would sign him permanently in the summer; ironically his parent club, Chesterfield, were relegated in last place. He was released by Chesterfield upon his return to the Proact Stadium in May 2017.

=== Bury ===
O'Shea turned down a contract offer from Sheffield United and instead joined League One club Bury on a two-year contract in July 2017. He went straight into the starting eleven for the opening fixture, at home to Walsall, but lasted only 54 minutes before sustaining a medial ligament injury that was expected to keep him out for six weeks. He marked his return to fitness with a goal in a 3–1 victory over Bradford City at Gigg Lane on 14 October. He ended the 2017–18 campaign with four goals in 30 appearances as the "Shakers" were relegated with a last-place finish.

On 17 November, he scored a brace in a 4–0 home win over Stevenage, including a "perfectly executed freekick", to win himself a place on the EFL Team of the Week. He was named as EFL League Two Player of the Month for November 2018 and January 2019, and said that "I've only ever won one of these before this season, so to win two in three months is excellent." On 19 January, he scored a "superb solo goal" in a 2–1 win at Forest Green Rovers that saw him again named on the EFL Team of the Week. On 9 February, he scored a brace in a 3–2 win at Morecambe to earn himself a place on the EFL Team of the Week for the third time that season. After scoring 15 goals in 44 league games he was named on the League Two PFA Team of the Year and the EFL Team of the Season for the 2018–19 campaign, alongside midfield teammate Danny Mayor. Bury went on to secure promotion as runners-up of League Two. In the summer he was strongly linked with a move to Plymouth Argyle, who were managed by former Bury boss Ryan Lowe.

=== Brisbane Roar ===
On 28 June 2019, O'Shea left England for Australia and signed with A-League club Brisbane Roar, who were managed by former Liverpool striker Robbie Fowler. He settled in quickly and was named as the club's Player of the Month for October. He made 24 appearances before the 2019–20 season was suspended due to the COVID-19 pandemic in Australia. He won the club's Player of the Year and Players' Player of the Year awards and signed a new contract in February 2021. Brisbane reached the elimination semi-finals of the finals series in the 2020–21 season, where they were beaten 2–1 by Adelaide United. O'Shea was named as a substitute on the A-League Team of the Season.

O'Shea started all 26 A-League games of the 2021–22 season and was named as an A-Leagues All Star for the game against Barcelona on 25 May. He was gain named as the club's Player of the Year and Players' Player of the Year. He was named in the PFA A-League Team of the Season for the 2022–23 campaign, having scored nine goals in 24 league games. He signed a two-year contract extension in December 2023. He was selected to play in the 2024 A-Leagues All Stars Men game against Newcastle United, which the All Stars ran out as 8–0 winners. He scored eight goals in 31 games during the 2023–24 campaign. He featured 27 times in the 2024–25 season, scoring three goals. He was named as the club's Player of the Year for a third time and Player's Player for a sixth time. He played 21 games in the 2025–26 campaign, scoring two goals, before leaving the club having reached fourth in all-time Roar appearances.

=== Perth Glory ===
On 22 October 2026, O'Shea signed with A-League side Perth Glory.

== International career ==
O'Shea is eligible to represent Ireland or Australia when he obtains citizenship in 2024 after living in the country for 5 years. He has represented Ireland at under-19, under-21, and under-23 levels. He scored on his U21 debut on 28 March 2009, scoring the first goal in a 2–1 win over Spain U21. He made his only appearance for the under-23s on 21 October 2008, in a 2–1 loss to Belgium under-23s at Dalymount Park.

== Career statistics ==
As of match played 25 April 2026

Appearances and goals by club, season and competition
| Club | Season | League | | | National cup (Note: Includes FAI Cup, FA Cup, Australia Cup) | | League cup (Note: Includes League of Ireland Cup, Football League Cup) | | Other | | Total | |
| Club | Season | Division | Apps | Goals | Apps | Goals | Apps | Goals | Apps | Goals | Apps | Goals |
|---|---|---|---|---|---|---|---|---|---|---|---|---|
| Bray Wanderers | 2006 | League of Ireland Premier | 9 | 0 | 0 | 0 | 0 | 0 | 0 | 0 | 9 | 0 |
| Bray Wanderers | 2007 | League of Ireland Premier | 26 | 2 | 1 | 0 | 0 | 0 | 0 | 0 | 27 | 2 |
| Bray Wanderers | Total | | 35 | 2 | 1 | 0 | 0 | 0 | 0 | 0 | 36 | 2 |
| Galway United | 2008 | League of Ireland Premier | 29 | 7 | 4 | 2 | 4 | 1 | 0 | 0 | 37 | 10 |
| Galway United | 2009 | League of Ireland Premier | 19 | 4 | 1 | 1 | 3 | 1 | 0 | 0 | 23 | 6 |
| Galway United | Total | | 48 | 11 | 5 | 3 | 7 | 2 | 0 | 0 | 60 | 16 |
| Birmingham City | 2009–10 | Premier League | 1 | 0 | 0 | 0 | 2 | 0 | — | | 3 | 0 |
| Birmingham City | 2010–11 | Premier League | 0 | 0 | 0 | 0 | 0 | 0 | — | | 0 | 0 |
| Birmingham City | Total | | 1 | 0 | 0 | 0 | 2 | 0 | 0 | 0 | 3 | 0 |
| Middlesbrough (loan) | 2009–10 | Championship | 2 | 0 | — | | — | | — | | 2 | 0 |
| Stevenage (loan) | 2010–11 | League Two | 5 | 0 | 2 | 0 | — | | — | | 7 | 0 |
| Port Vale (loan) | 2010–11 | League Two | 5 | 1 | — | | — | | — | | 5 | 1 |
| Milton Keynes Dons | 2011–12 | League One | 28 | 5 | 2 | 1 | 2 | 0 | 3 (Note: One appearance in Football League Trophy; two in League One play-offs) | 0 | 35 | 6 |
| Milton Keynes Dons | 2012–13 | League One | 11 | 1 | 2 | 1 | 3 | 0 | 1 (Note: Appearances in Football League Trophy) | 0 | 17 | 2 |
| Milton Keynes Dons | Total | | 39 | 6 | 4 | 2 | 5 | 0 | 4 | 0 | 52 | 8 |
| Chesterfield (loan) | 2012–13 | League Two | 7 | 2 | 0 | 0 | — | | — | | 7 | 2 |
| Chesterfield | 2012–13 | League Two | 19 | 5 | 0 | 0 | 0 | 0 | 0 | 0 | 19 | 5 |
| Chesterfield | 2013–14 | League Two | 40 | 9 | 2 | 0 | 1 | 0 | 4 | 0 | 47 | 9 |
| Chesterfield | 2014–15 | League One | 41 | 7 | 4 | 2 | 0 | 0 | 2 (Note: Appearances in League One play-offs) | 0 | 47 | 9 |
| Chesterfield | 2015–16 | League One | 46 | 9 | 3 | 0 | 1 | 0 | 1 | 0 | 51 | 9 |
| Chesterfield | 2016–17 | League One | 27 | 6 | 2 | 1 | 1 | 0 | 3 (Note: Appearances in EFL Trophy) | 1 | 33 | 8 |
| Chesterfield | Total | | 180 | 38 | 11 | 3 | 3 | 0 | 10 | 1 | 204 | 42 |
| Sheffield United (loan) | 2016–17 | League One | 10 | 3 | — | | — | | — | | 10 | 3 |
| Bury | 2017–18 | League One | 27 | 4 | 2 | 0 | 0 | 0 | 1 | 0 | 30 | 4 |
| Bury | 2018–19 | League Two | 44 | 15 | 2 | 1 | 1 | 0 | 3 | 0 | 50 | 16 |
| Bury | Total | | 71 | 19 | 4 | 1 | 1 | 0 | 4 | 0 | 80 | 20 |
| Brisbane Roar | 2019–20 | A-League | 27 | 1 | 2 | 1 | — | | — | | 29 | 2 |
| Brisbane Roar | 2020–21 | A-League | 27 | 4 | 0 | 0 | — | | — | | 27 | 4 |
| Brisbane Roar | 2021–22 | A-League Men | 26 | 3 | 3 | 0 | — | | — | | 29 | 3 |
| Brisbane Roar | 2022–23 | A-League Men | 24 | 9 | 3 | 1 | — | | — | | 27 | 10 |
| Brisbane Roar | 2023–24 | A-League Men | 26 | 7 | 5 | 1 | — | | — | | 31 | 8 |
| Brisbane Roar | 2024–25 | A-League Men | 26 | 3 | 1 | 0 | — | | — | | 27 | 3 |
| Brisbane Roar | 2025–26 | A-League Men | 21 | 2 | 0 | 0 | — | | — | | 21 | 2 |
| Brisbane Roar | Total | | 177 | 29 | 14 | 3 | — | | — | | 191 | 32 |
| Perth Glory | 2026–27 | A-League Men | 0 | 0 | 0 | 0 | — | | — | | 0 | 0 |
| Career total | | | 580 | 111 | 41 | 12 | 18 | 2 | 18 | 1 | 657 | 126 |

== Honours ==
Chesterfield

- Football League Two: 2013–14
- Football League Trophy runner-up: 2013–14

Sheffield United

- EFL League One: 2016–17

Bury

- EFL League Two second-place promotion: 2018–19

Individual

- EFL League One Player of the Month: November 2016
- EFL League Two Player of the Month: November 2018, January 2019
- EFL Team of the Season: 2018–19
- PFA Team of the Year: 2018–19 League Two
- PFA A-League Team of the Season: 2020–21, 2022–23
- A-Leagues All Star: 2022, 2024
- Brisbane Roar Gary Wilkins Medal: 2020–21, 2021–22, 2024–25
- Brisbane Roar Player's Player of the Year: 2019–20, 2020–21, 2021–22, 2022–23, 2023–24, 2024–25
