= Sam Klein (soccer) =

Australian soccer player

- Klein in 2026

Personal information
- Full name: Samuel Klein
- Date of birth: 15 March 2004 (age 22)
- Place of birth: Gympie, Queensland, Australia
- Position: Central midfielder

Team information
- Current team: FC St. Pauli
- Number: 22

Youth career
- Sunshine Coast FC
- Brisbane Roar

Senior career*
Years	Team	Apps	(Gls)
2021–2023	Brisbane Roar NPL	33	(1)
2022	Brisbane Roar	1	(0)
2024	Gold Coast Knights	21	(0)
2024–2026	Brisbane Roar	44	(9)
2026–	FC St. Pauli	6	(0)

International career^{‡}
2022–2024	Australia U20	1	(0)
2026–	Australia	1	(0)
- * Club domestic league appearances and goals as of 23 October 2026 ‡ National team caps and goals as of 13 November 2026

Sam Klein (German: [klaɪn]; born 15 March 2004) is an Australian professional soccer player who plays as a central midfielder for 2. Bundesliga club FC St. Pauli and the Australia national team.

== Club career ==
In May 2026 it was announced that Klein would join German club FC St. Pauli for the 2026–27 season.

== International career ==
Klein was called up to the Australian national team for the first time in November 2026 for friendly internationals against Qatar and Jordan. He made his international debut as a second-half substitute in a 3–0 win over Qatar on 13 November 2026.

== Career statistics ==
As of match played 23 October 2026

Appearances and goals by club, season and competition
Club	Season	League			National cup		Continental		Other		Total	
Club	Season	Division	Apps	Goals	Apps	Goals	Apps	Goals	Apps	Goals	Apps	Goals
Brisbane Roar NPL	2021	NPL Queensland	22	1	—		—		—		22	1
Brisbane Roar NPL	2022	NPL Queensland	11	0	—		—		—		11	0
Brisbane Roar NPL	Total		33	1	—		—		—		33	1
Brisbane Roar	2021–22	A-League Men	1	0	—		—		—		1	0
Gold Coast Knights	2024	NPL Queensland	21	0	—		—		—		21	0
Brisbane Roar	2024–25	A-League Men	19	5	1	0	—		—		20	5
Brisbane Roar	2025–26	A-League Men	25	4	0	0	—		—		25	4
Brisbane Roar	Total		44	9	1	0	—		—		45	9
FC St. Pauli	2026–27	2. Bundesliga	6	0	0	0	—		0	0	6	0
Career total			105	10	1	0	0	0	0	0	106	10
