= African Nations Cup of South Australia =

Soccer tournament held in Adelaide, South Australia

- Organiser(s): Football South Australia; African Communities Council of South Australia
- Founded: 2000; 26 years ago
- Region: Australia
- Teams: Variable
- Current champions: DR Congo Men (2025 Champions) - South Sudan Women
- Most championships: Burundi, Liberia, DR Congo, South Sudan
- Website: African Nations Cup of South Australia on Facebook

The African Nations Cup, officially African Nations Cup of South Australia and also known as the RAA African Nations Cup, is an annual association football (soccer) tournament for African Australians held by Football South Australia in partnership with the African Communities Council of South Australia (ACCSA) in Adelaide, South Australia. ACCSA established the event in 2000, with the inaugural edition of the tournament being held in 2001. It has grown year on year, and is now a major event for talent scouts from clubs around the country.

== History ==
The inaugural African Nations Cup of South Australia was founded in 2000, with the inaugural event held in 2001, when four teams were entered. Since then it has grown year on year, and now includes both men's and women's competition. As of 2024 there are plans to include a youth competition.

== Description and impact ==
The African Nations Cup of SA is a football tournament and is one of two major events for the African community held by ACCSA. It has attracted over 10,000 spectators, and has become a major showcase of young talent, as well as a showcase of African culture.

The tournament has featured several top South Australian players, including Al Hassan Toure, Elvis Kamsoba, Thomas Deng, Hosine Bility, and Teeboy Kamara, and many clubs use the occasion to scout for new talent. Several participants have later played for the national teams of Australia (the Socceroos) and/or their African countries of birth, and the tournament has contributed to South Australia's success in developing the skills of prominent African-Australian players, such as Nestory Irankunda and Kusini Yengi.

The tournament includes players based in South Australia as well as Victoria, some of whom play in the Victorian Premier League.

== African Communities Council of South Australia ==
The African Communities Council of South Australia (ACCSA) is a non-profit organisation run by volunteers that represents over 35 ethnic African communities in South Australia, based in Adelaide. It aims to promote and preserve African culture, and to connect and serve the African diaspora in the state.

== Past competitions ==
In 2013, South Sudan won the tournament. Their team, Sierra Stars, played in Division 4 of the SA Amateur League for the first time in that year, and were the only African team in the league. Many of the players are students, and team members have to finance their uniforms and other expenses relating to playing in the team.

From 2016, the RAA became the main sponsor for the event, making it the RAA African Nations Cup.

In 2017, Liberia won the tournament, beating DR Congo 3–0 in the Grand Final.

The 2018 event was the largest edition thus far, and was hosted by the Football Federation South Australia in partnership with the Office for Recreation and Sport and ACCSA. Held at the VALO Football Centre at The Parks in the suburb of Angle Park, over 600 players participated across 20 men's teams and 4 women's teams. It was held over the long weekend, 28 September – 1 October 2018, with the Grand Final late on Monday Afternoon.

The event was cancelled in 2020 owing to the COVID-19 pandemic.

The 2021 edition was held in November 2021 with more teams and players than previous events; 29 teams and more than 600 players. There was an opening and closing ceremony for the first time at this edition of the tournament. There were four groups in the men's competition, while the women's tournament had five teams: Liberia, South Sudan, Guinea, Burundi and "The Horn of Africa", a combined side comprising women from Ethiopia, Somalia, and Eritrea.

As of 2021, Liberia was the most successful country in the tournament, with five wins, while Sierra Leone and Sudan had both won more than once. In that year, Sierra Leone won the tournament.

In 2022, the RAA African Nations Cup was held in November at ServiceFM Stadium in Gepps Cross, with some games being played during the week and the finals on Sunday 13 November. Football SA covered all female players' registration fees for the event, as part of its World Cup Legacy Plan to encourage more women to play the game.

The 2023 event was also held at the ServiceFM Stadium, with the finals on Sunday 19 November. Somalia won the men's tournament and Liberia were the women's champions. Burundi and Morocco were the runners-up, respectively.
