= Milorad Stajić =

Bosnian footballer

Personal information
- Date of birth: 7 February 2002 (age 24)
- Place of birth: Meiringen, Switzerland
- Height: 1.80 m (5 ft 11 in)
- Position: Defensive midfielder

Team information
- Current team: Brisbane Roar
- Number: 77

Youth career
- 2017–2021: FC Basel

Senior career*
Years	Team	Apps	(Gls)
2022–2023	Grafičar Beograd	39	(2)
2023–2025	Radnički Niš	48	(0)
2025–	Brisbane Roar	7	(0)

International career^{‡}
- Switzerland U18
2023	Bosnia and Herzegovina U21	1	(0)
- * Club domestic league appearances and goals as of 7 December 2025 ‡ National team caps and goals as of 15 December 2023

Milorad Stajić (Bosnian: [mîloɾad stǎjitɕ]; born 7 February 2002) is a professional footballer who plays as a defensive midfielder for A-League Men side Brisbane Roar. Born in Switzerland, he has represented Bosnia and Herzegovina at youth level.

== Club career ==
Born in Meiringen, Switzerland, Stajić started playing in the youth team of Swiss giants FC Basel in 2017. During the winter-break of the 2021–22 season, he decided to go senior and professional, and signed with Serbian First League main team of FK Grafičar Beograd.

At the end of the 2022–23 season, he caught the attention of a Serbian SuperLiga side, FK Radnički Niš where he joined his compatriot Filip Frei.

On 17 June 2025, Stajić signed for Australian side Brisbane Roar on a two-year deal.

== International career ==
After playing for Swiss U18 team, in 2023 Stajić decided to accept a call and debuted for the Bosnia and Herzegovina national under-21 team.
