= Justin Vidic =

Australian soccer player

Personal information
- Full name: Justin Vidic
- Date of birth: 29 April 2004 (age 22)
- Place of birth: Sydney, New South Wales, Australia
- Height: 1.87 m (6 ft 2 in)
- Position: Striker

Team information
- Current team: Brisbane Roar
- Number: 17

Youth career
- –2022: Marconi Stallions

Senior career*
Years	Team	Apps	(Gls)
2022–2023	Marconi Stallions	22	(3)
2023–2024	Newcastle Jets NPL	8	(9)
2023–2025	Newcastle Jets	13	(1)
2025–	Brisbane Roar	23	(4)
- * Club domestic league appearances and goals as of 28 July 2025

Justin Vidić (Serbian: [ˈʋiditɕ]; born 29 April 2004) is an Australian soccer player who currently plays as a striker for Brisbane Roar in the A-League.

== Career ==
Having come through the Marconi youth set up, Vidic was brought through to the senior men's team ahead of the 2023 National Premier Leagues NSW season.

Following his breakthrough season in the NPL1, he was signed by A-League Men club Newcastle Jets on a scholarship deal, and was praised for his performance during his debut against Melbourne City. Vidic would score his first goal for Newcastle in a 1–3 loss to Adelaide United at Coopers Stadium.

Vidic scored twice in a 2–1 victory against Rockdale Ilinden FC during the Round of 32 of the 2024 Australia Cup.
