= Jordan Lauton =

Australian soccer player

Personal information
- Date of birth: 1 April 2003 (age 23)
- Place of birth: Ballarat, Victoria, Australia
- Height: 1.80 m (5 ft 11 in)
- Position: Attacking midfielder

Team information
- Current team: Brisbane Roar
- Number: 44

Youth career
- Ballarat City
- 2021–2024: Western United

Senior career*
Years	Team	Apps	(Gls)
2019–2021	Ballarat City	37	(1)
2022–2025	Western United NPL	57	(1)
2024–2025	Western United	19	(1)
2025–	Brisbane Roar	19	(1)
- * Club domestic league appearances and goals as of 16 September 2026

Jordan Lauton (/ˈlɔ(ː)tən/; born 1 April 2003) is an Australian soccer player who plays as an attacking midfielder for Brisbane Roar in A-League Men.

== Early and personal life ==
Lauton attended St Patrick's College in Ballarat, Victoria, from 2015 to 2020. He played for Ballarat City as a youth, and for three years in the academy of Western United, before turning professional in 2024. After finishing school, he began a degree in civil engineering at Federation University Australia.

Lauton has two brothers, Brandon and Leighton, who also play soccer.

== Career ==
Lauton made his senior debut for Western United in A-League Men on 3 February 2024, as a 63rd-minute substitute in a 2–2 home draw with Sydney FC. He became the 4,000th male to play in a national league in Australia, either the A-League or the National Soccer League.

On 3 January 2025, Lauton scored the winning goal from an overhead kick as Western United came from 2–1 down after 90 minutes to win 3–2 at Perth Glory. He received a second yellow card and was sent off for his goal celebration, therefore being suspended for the following game against Melbourne City; Western United manager John Aloisi said "When you score goals like that, you probably can take off your top". Later that month, his contract was extended for two more years. At the end of the 2024–25 A-League Men season, his goal was voted the Goal of the Year.

Due to financial problems, Western United was excluded from the 2025–26 A-League Men, and the players' contracts were terminated. On 18 September 2025, Lauton signed a two-year deal at Brisbane Roar.

== Honours ==
- A-League Men Goal of the Year: 2024–25
