= Georgios Vrakas =

Greek footballer (born 2001)

Personal information
- Date of birth: 28 April 2001 (age 25)
- Place of birth: Ioannina, Greece
- Height: 1.80 m (5 ft 11 in)
- Position: Attacking midfielder

Team information
- Current team: Levadiakos
- Number: 77

Youth career
- 2014–2017: PAOK
- 2018–2020: Napoli

Senior career*
Years	Team	Apps	(Gls)
2020–2024	PAOK	2	(0)
2021–2023	→ Levadiakos (loan)	58	(5)
2023	PAOK B	4	(1)
2024–2025	Atromitos	17	(0)
2025	→ Athens Kallithea (loan)	11	(0)
2025–2026	Brisbane Roar	24	(1)
2026–	Levadiakos	1	(0)

International career^{‡}
2017	Greece U16	4	(1)
2017–2018	Greece U17	10	(3)
2018–2019	Greece U18	5	(1)
2018–2019	Greece U19	6	(2)
- * Club domestic league appearances and goals as of 20 September 2026 ‡ National team caps and goals as of 19 November 2019

Georgios Vrakas (Greek: Γεώργιος Βρακάς, pronounced [ʝeˈo̞rʝios vraˈkas]; born 28 April 2001) is a Greek professional footballer who plays as an attacking midfielder or a winger for Super League club Levadiakos.

== Career ==
=== Early career ===
Giorgos Vrakas was born on April 28, 2001, in Ioannina and from an early age joined the Academies of AO Ioannina. In 2014, he took the big step and became a member of the PAOK Academy. With the black and white, he impressed in all age groups – he was of course a constant preference in the calls of the federal technicians – and in 2017 he made his debut with the first team in a game against Aiginiakos for the Greek Cup. In fact, he became the second youngest player to debut with PAOK.

=== Napoli ===
In August 2018, he left and joined Napoli's second team for a five-year deal. In two years in Italy, Vrakas participated in 20 matches, scoring three goals and providing three assists. In the summer of 2020, he decided to return to Greece, with PAOK not missing the opportunity and signing the young attacking midfielder for the next three years".

=== PAOK ===
An old ... acquaintance, trained with the philosophy of the PAOK Academy, Giorgos Vrakas returned to PAOK, signing a cooperation contract with Dikefalos until 2023. Giorgos Vrakas will continue his career at Levadiakos. The 20-year-old midfielder returned to PAOK from Napoli last year, making just three appearances (two in the league and one in the Cup) for the Northern Doubleheader last season. Vrakas agreed with Levadeiakos, who announced his acquisition. "Despite the fact that there were proposals from Dutch teams, it was preferred for the footballer to continue with the team that gave him an important role in the attempt to rise to the Super League", it is emphasized by PAOK regarding Vrakas, who the previous year was one of its pioneers promotion on behalf of Levadeaikos, counting 34 appearances and 5 goals.

== Honours ==
PAOK

- Greek Cup: 2017–18, 2020–21

Levadiakos

- Super League 2: 2021–22
