= Nathan Amanatidis =

Australian soccer player

Personal information
- Full name: Nathan Amanatidis
- Date of birth: 23 January 2006 (age 20)
- Place of birth: Adelaide, South Australia, Australia
- Position: Winger

Team information
- Current team: Brisbane Roar
- Number: 22

Youth career
- –2017: Adelaide Comets
- 2018–2022: West Adelaide
- 2023: Adelaide United

Senior career*
Years	Team	Apps	(Gls)
2021–2022	West Adelaide	27	(0)
2023	Adelaide United NPL	14	(6)
2023–2025	Sydney FC NPL	6	(1)
2023–2025	Sydney FC	14	(0)
2025–	Brisbane Roar	10	(0)

International career^{‡}
2023	Australia U17	4	(2)
2024–	Australia U20	2	(0)
- * Club domestic league appearances and goals as of 26 April 2025 ‡ National team caps and goals as of 17 November 2024

Nathan Amanatidis (Greek: Νάθαν Αμανατίδης, pronounced [amanaˈtiðis]; born 23 January 2006) is an Australian professional soccer player who plays as a winger for Brisbane Roar.

== Career ==
=== Youth career ===
Amanatidis played youth football for Adelaide Comets before joining West Adelaide. He made his senior debut for West Adelaide when he was just 15-years-old, making 10 appearances for the side in the 2021 season in South Australia's second division. The following season, he made 17 appearances for the senior side.

In 2023, Amanatidis reached a deal to sign with Grimsby Town. He later turned his back on this deal however and joined Adelaide United's NPL team for the 2023 season, making 14 appearances for the club and scoring six goals.

=== Senior career ===
On 18 July 2023, Sydney FC announced it had signed Amanatidis on a three-year contract, reportedly beating eight other A-League clubs to secure his signature. He made his official debut for the club, coming off the bench in a 2–0 win over APIA Leichhardt in the Australia Cup Round of 16.

On 23 January 2025, it was announced that Brisbane Roar had signed Amanatidis on a two-and-a-half-year deal.

=== International career ===
Born in Australia, Amanatidis is of Greek descent. On 13 June 2023, he received a call-up for the Australia men's national under-17 soccer team for the 2023 AFC U-17 Asian Cup. During the tournament, he scored two goals and made one assist.

== Honours ==
=== Club ===
==== Sydney FC ====
- Australia Cup: 2023
