= Austin Ludwik =

Australian soccer player

Personal information
- Full name: Austin Ludwik
- Date of birth: 11 February 1997 (age 29)
- Place of birth: Gold Coast, Australia
- Height: 1.83 m (6 ft 0 in)
- Position: Centre-back

Team information
- Current team: Lions FC
- Number: 6

Youth career
- 2014–2015: Brisbane Roar

Senior career*
Years	Team	Apps	(Gls)
2014–2015	Brisbane Roar NPL	12	(0)
2016–2017	Gold Coast City	15	(1)
2017–2019	Gannon University	48	(3)
2018	Gold Coast United	7	(0)
2019–2025	Gold Coast Knights	104	(10)
2025–2026	Brisbane Roar	15	(0)
2026–	Gold Coast Knights	9	(1)
2026–	Lions FC	4	(1)
- * Club domestic league appearances and goals as of 9 November 2026 ‡ National team caps and goals as of 28 September 2022

Austin Ludwik (/ˈlʌdwɪk/ lud-WICK, Polish: [ˈludvik]; born 11 February 1997) is an Australian professional soccer player who plays as a centre-back for Lions FC in the Australian Championship.
