= Hosine Bility =

Australian soccer player (born 2001)

Personal information
- Full name: Hosine Bility
- Date of birth: 10 May 2001 (age 25)
- Place of birth: Guinea
- Height: 1.87 m (6 ft 2 in)
- Position: Centre-back

Team information
- Current team: Brisbane Roar
- Number: 15

Youth career
- Croydon Kings
- 2018–2022: Midtjylland

Senior career*
Years	Team	Apps	(Gls)
2016–2018	Croydon Kings	39	(0)
2020–2022	Midtjylland	0	(0)
2022	→ Fram Reykjavík (loan)	4	(0)
2022–2025	Mafra	0	(0)
2024–2025	→ Brisbane Roar (loan)	23	(0)
2025–	Brisbane Roar	7	(0)

International career
2022–2024	Australia U23	5	(0)
Medal record
Men's football
Representing Australia
WAFF U-23 Championship
Runner-up	2024 Saudi Arabia
- * Club domestic league appearances and goals as of 28 April 2026

Hosine Bility (/hoˈsi.ne biˈli.ti/; born 10 May 2001) is an Australian professional football player who plays as a centre-back for Brisbane Roar. Born a Liberian refugee in Guinea, he represents Australia at youth level.

== Early life ==
Hosine Bility was born on 10 May 2001 in Guinea, West Africa, and raised in Adelaide, South Australia, after moving there with his family at the age of six.

== Club career ==
=== Early career ===
Bility played with Croydon Kings in the NPL in South Australia.

=== Midtjylland ===
Bility joined Midtjylland in September in 2019, signing a five-year deal with Midtjylland where he initially joined the club's U-19 team. He joined Fram Reykjavík on loan in the 2021–22 season, making four appearances.

=== Mafra ===
On 19 August 2022, Bility joined Portuguese second division side Mafra on a five-year deal.

=== Brisbane Roar ===
In June 2024, Bility was signed by Brisbane Roar on loan for a season (until 1 July 25) from Mafra. On 24 June 2025, Brisbane Roar announced that they had signed Bility on a permanent basis for an undisclosed fee.

== International career ==
Bility is eligible to play for Guinea, Liberia, and Australia internationally.

He played three matches for the Australia under-23s in the 2022 AFC U-23 Asian Cup. In June 2023, he took part in the Maurice Revello Tournament in France with Australia.

In early 2024, he played for Australia at the West Asian Football Federation U23 Championship in Saudi Arabia.

== Other appearances ==
Bility has played in the African Nations Cup of South Australia.

== Honours ==
Australia U-23

- WAFF U-23 Championship: runner-up 2024
