= Dimitri Valkanis =

Australian soccer player (born 2005)

Personal information
- Date of birth: 18 October 2005 (age 21)
- Place of birth: Adelaide, Australia
- Height: 1.88 m (6 ft 2 in)
- Position: Central defender

Team information
- Current team: Brisbane Roar
- Number: 3

Youth career
- 2016–2017: Melbourne City
- 2017–2024: AEK Athens

Senior career*
| Years | Team | Apps | (Gls) |
| 2024–2025 | AEK Athens B | 19 | (0) |
| 2025–2026 | AEK Athens | 0 | (0) |
| 2025–2026 | → Brisbane Roar (loan) | 23 | (3) |
| 2026– | Brisbane Roar | 0 | (0) |

International career^{‡}
| 2024 | Australia U20 | 2 | (1) |
- * Club domestic league appearances and goals as of 13 March 2026 ‡ National team caps and goals as of 19 November 2024

Dimitri Valkanis (Greek: Δημήτρης Βαλκάνης; born 18 October 2005) is a professional soccer player who plays as a central defender for A-League Men club Brisbane Roar.

== Early life ==
Valkanis was born on 18 October 2005. Born in Adelaide, Australia, he is the son of Australia international Michael Valkanis.

== Club career ==
As a youth player, Valkanis joined the youth academy of Australian side Melbourne City. Following his stint there, he joined the youth academy of Greek side AEK Athens and was promoted to the club's reserve team ahead of the 2024–25 season. During the summer of 2025, he was sent on loan to Australian side Brisbane Roar.

== International career ==
Valkanis is an Australia youth international and has been called up to represent Greece internationally at youth level. On 13 November 2024, he debuted for the Australia men's national under-20 soccer team during a 4–2 away friendly win over the Kyrgyzstan national under-20 football team.
