= 2024–25 in Australian soccer =

56th season of national competitive soccer in Australia

Soccer in Australia
- Season: 2024–25

Men's soccer
- ALM Premiership: Auckland FC
- ALM Championship: Melbourne City
- Australia Cup: Macarthur FC

Women's soccer
- ALW Premiership: Melbourne City
- ALW Championship: Central Coast Mariners

The 2024–25 season was the 56th season of national competitive Soccer in Australia and 142nd overall.

== National teams ==
=== Men's senior ===
==== FIFA World Cup qualification ====
===== Third round =====
====== Table ======
Pos	Team	Pld	W	D	L	GF	GA	GD	Pts	Qualification	(Japan)	(Australia)	(Saudi Arabia)	(Indonesia)	(China)	(Bahrain)
1	Japan	10	7	2	1	30	3	+27	23	2026 FIFA World Cup	—	1–1	0–0	6–0	7–0	2–0
2	Australia	10	5	4	1	16	7	+9	19	2026 FIFA World Cup	1–0	—	0–0	5–1	3–1	0–1
3	Saudi Arabia	10	3	4	3	7	8	−1	13	Fourth round	0–2	1–2	—	1–1	1–0	0–0
4	Indonesia	10	3	3	4	9	20	−11	12	Fourth round	0–4	0–0	2–0	—	1–0	1–0
5	China	10	3	0	7	7	20	−13	9		1–3	0–2	1–2	2–1	—	1–0
6	Bahrain	10	1	3	6	5	16	−11	6		0–5	2–2	0–2	2–2	0–1	—

Source: AFC, FIFA
Rules for classification: Tiebreakers

====== Matches ======
5 September 2024 Third round	Australia	0–1	Bahrain	Gold Coast, Australia
20:00 UTC+10		Report	Souttar 89' (o.g.)	Stadium: Robina Stadium; Referee: Omar Al-Ali (United Arab Emirates)

10 September 2024 Third round	Indonesia	0–0	Australia	Jakarta, Indonesia
19:00 UTC+7		Report		Stadium: Gelora Bung Karno Stadium; Attendance: 70,059; Referee: Salman Ahmad Falahi (Qatar)

10 October 2024 Third round	Australia	3–1	China	Adelaide, Australia
19:40 UTC+10:30	Miller 45+2'; Goodwin 53'; Velupillay 90+2'	Report	Xie 20'	Stadium: Adelaide Oval; Attendance: 46,291; Referee: Nazmi Nasaruddin (Malaysia)

15 October 2024 Third round	Japan	1–1	Australia	Saitama, Japan
19:35 UTC+9	Burgess 76' (o.g.)	Report	Taniguchi 58' (o.g.)	Stadium: Saitama Stadium 2002; Referee: Ahmed Al-Ali (Kuwait)

14 November 2024 Third round	Australia	0–0	Saudi Arabia	Melbourne, Australia
20:10 UTC+11		Report		Stadium: Melbourne Rectangular Stadium; Attendance: 27,491; Referee: Adel Ali Ahmed Khamis Al-Naqbi (United Arab Emirates)

19 November 2024 Third round	Bahrain	2–2	Australia	Riffa, Bahrain
18:15 UTC+3	Abduljabbar 75', 77'	Report	Yengi 1', 90+6'	Stadium: Bahrain National Stadium; Attendance: 6,873; Referee: Ko Hyung-jin (South Korea)

20 March 2025 Third round	Australia	5–1	Indonesia	Sydney, Australia
20:10 UTC+11	Boyle 18' (pen.); Velupillay 20'; Irvine 34', 90'; Miller 61'	Report	Romeny 78'	Stadium: Sydney Football Stadium; Attendance: 35,241; Referee: Adham Makhadmeh (Jordan)

25 March 2025 Third round	China	0–2	Australia	Hangzhou, China
19:00 UTC+8		Report	Irvine 16'; Velupillay 29'	Stadium: Hangzhou Olympic Sports Center Stadium; Attendance: 70,588; Referee: Mooud Bonyadifard (Iran)

5 June 2025 Third round	Australia	1–0	Japan	Perth, Australia
19:00 UTC+8	Behich 90'	Report		Stadium: Perth Stadium; Attendance: 57,226; Referee: Qasim Al-Hatmi (Oman)

10 June 2025 Third round	Saudi Arabia	1–2	Australia	Jeddah, Saudi Arabia
21:15 UTC+3	Al-Aboud 19'	Report	Metcalfe 42'; Duke 48'	Stadium: King Abdullah Sports City; Attendance: 24,620; Referee: Abdulrahman Al-Jassim (Qatar)

=== Women's senior ===
==== Friendlies ====
The following is a list of friendlies played by the women's senior national team in 2024–25.

13 July 2024 'B' friendly	Australia	1–2	Canada	Marbella, Spain
21:00 UTC+02:00	Freier 23'	Report	Prince 41'; Viens 85'	Attendance: 0 (behind closed doors)

25 October 2024	Switzerland	1–1	Australia	Zurich, Switzerland
20:00 UTC+2	Reuteler 58'	Report	Foord 43' (pen.)	Stadium: Stadion Letzigrund; Attendance: 14,370; Referee: Shona Shukrula (Netherlands)

28 October 2024	Germany	1–2	Australia	Duisburg, Germany
18:10 UTC+1	Cerci 5'	Report	Cooney-Cross 39'; Hunt 77'	Stadium: Schauinsland-Reisen-Arena; Attendance: 26,623; Referee: Maria Marotta (Italy)

28 November 2024	Australia	1–3	Brazil	Brisbane, Australia
20:00 UTC+10	Foord 43'	Report	Gutierres 6', 13'; Queiroz 54'	Stadium: Suncorp Stadium; Attendance: 47,501; Referee: Oh Hyun-jung (South Korea)

1 December 2024	Australia	1–2	Brazil	Gold Coast, Australia
18:35 UTC+10	Raso 42'	Report	Portilho 30'; Lauren 40'	Stadium: Cbus Super Stadium; Attendance: 25,297

4 December 2024	Australia	3–1	Chinese Taipei	Melbourne, Australia
20:00 UTC+11	Prior 10'; Freier 12'; Henry 78'	Report	Chen 34'	Stadium: AAMI Park; Attendance: 26,795; Referee: Haruna Kanematsu (Japan)

7 December 2024	Australia	6–0	Chinese Taipei	Geelong, Australia
19:30 UTC+11	Davidson 6'; Yallop 11'; Gielnik 40'; Heyman 56'; Prior 73'; Freier 78'	Report		Stadium: GMHBA Stadium; Attendance: 30,097; Referee: Azusa Sugino (Japan)

4 April 2025	Australia	1–0	South Korea	Sydney, Australia
20:00 UTC+11	Lim 54' (o.g.)	Report		Stadium: Allianz Stadium; Attendance: 37,199; Referee: Yoshimi Yamashita (Japan)

7 April 2025	Australia	2–0	South Korea	Newcastle, Australia
19:30 UTC+10	Fowler 43'; Lim 63' (o.g.)	Report		Stadium: McDonald Jones Stadium; Attendance: 28,019

30 May 2025	Australia	2–0	Argentina	Melbourne, Australia
20:00 UTC+10	Johnson 38'; Torpey 69'	Report		Stadium: Marvel Stadium; Attendance: 43,020

2 June 2025	Australia	4–1	Argentina	Canberra, Australia
19:30 UTC+10	Sayer 14', 36'; van Egmond 72'; Heyman 83'	Report	Núñez 23'	Stadium: GIO Stadium; Attendance: 25,125; Referee: Supiree Testhomya (Thailand)

26 June 2025	Australia	3–0	Slovenia	Perth, Australia
19:00 UTC+8	Gielnik 3'; McNamara 86'; Raso 87'	Report		Stadium: HBF Park; Attendance: 8,678; Referee: Todrikan Delai (Fiji)

29 June 2025	Australia	1–1	Slovenia	Perth, Australia
18:00 UTC+8	Heyman 50'	Report	Kastelec 90+1'	Stadium: HBF Park; Attendance: 13,115; Referee: Anna-Marie Keighley (New Zealand)

==== 2024 Paris Olympic games ====
Pos	Team	Pld	W	D	L	GF	GA	GD	Pts	Qualification
1	United States	3	3	0	0	9	2	+7	9	Advance to knockout stage
2	Germany	3	2	0	1	8	5	+3	6	Advance to knockout stage
3	Australia	3	1	0	2	7	10	−3	3	
4	Zambia	3	0	0	3	6	13	−7	0	

Source: FIFA
Rules for classification: Group stage tiebreakers
25 July 2024
19:00

Germany	3–0	Australia
Hegering 24'; Schüller 64'; Brand 68'	Report

Stade de Marseille, Marseille
Attendance: 9,731
Referee: Katia García (Mexico)
25 July 2024
21:00

United States	3–0	Zambia
Rodman 17'; Swanson 24', 25'	Report

Stade de Nice, Nice
Attendance: 5,550
Referee: Ramon Abatti (Brazil)
28 July 2024
19:00

Australia	6–5	Zambia
Kennedy 7'; Raso 35'; Musole 58' (o.g.); Catley 65', 78' (pen.); Heyman 90'	Report	B. Banda 1', 33', 45+2'; Kundananji 21', 56'

Stade de Nice, Nice
Attendance: 4,441
Referee: Emikar Calderas (Venezuela)
28 July 2024
21:00

United States	4–1	Germany
Smith 11', 44'; Swanson 26'; Williams 89'	Report	Gwinn 22'

Stade de Marseille, Marseille
Attendance: 12,845
Referee: Yael Falcón (Argentina)
31 July 2024
19:00

Australia	1–2	United States
Kennedy 90+2'	Report	Rodman 43'; Albert 77'

Stade de Marseille, Marseille
Attendance: 13,036
Referee: François Letexier (France)
31 July 2024
19:00

Zambia	1–4	Germany
B. Banda 49'	Report	Schüller 10', 61'; Bühl 47'; Senß 90+5'

Stade Geoffroy-Guichard, Saint-Étienne
Attendance: 2,642
Referee: Yoshimi Yamashita (Japan)

Australia named a squad of 18 players and 4 alternates for the tournament on 4 June 2024. Australia performed poorly in the group stage, losing to both Germany and the United States, while barely beating Zambia, the lowest ranked team in the tournament (conceding 5 goals to them). They ended the tournament third place in their group and didn't advance to the knockout stage. Following the tournament Tony Gustavsson's contract came to an end.

25 July 2024 Group stage	Germany	3–0	Australia	Marseille, France
19:00 UTC+2	Hegering 24'; Schüller 64'; Brand 68'	Report		Stadium: Stade de Marseille; Referee: Katia García (Mexico)

28 July 2024 Group stage	Australia	6–5	Zambia	Nice, France
19:00 UTC+2	Kennedy 7'; Raso 35'; Musole 58' (o.g.); Catley 65', 78' (pen.); Heyman 90'	Report	B. Banda 1', 33', 45+2'; Kundananji 21', 56'	Stadium: Stade de Nice; Referee: Emikar Calderas (Venezuela)

31 July 2024 Group stage	Australia	1–2	United States	Marseille, France
19:00 UTC+2	Kennedy 90+2'	Report	Rodman 43'; Albert 77'	Stadium: Stade de Marseille; Referee: François Letexier (France)

==== SheBelieves Cup ====
In November 2024, Football Australia confirmed the Matildas would make their debut in the SheBelieves Cup in February 2025, joining Colombia and Japan in the United States.

20 February 2025	Japan	4–0	Australia	Houston, United States
16:00 UTC-6	Tanaka 6', 32'; Hamano 52'; Minami 75'	Report		Stadium: Shell Energy Stadium; Attendance: 5,243; Referee: Natalie Simon (USA)

23 February 2025	United States	2–1	Australia	Glendale, United States
15:00 UTC-7	Biyendolo 1'; Cooper 68'	Report	Heyman 80'	Stadium: State Farm Stadium; Attendance: 23,503; Referee: Amairany Garcia (Mexico)

26 February 2025	Australia	1–2	Colombia	San Diego, United States
16:30 UTC-8	Raso 69'	Report	Bonilla 15'; Usme 73'	Stadium: Snapdragon Stadium

=== Men's under-23 ===
==== Friendlies ====
The following is a list of friendlies played by the men's under-23 national team in 2024–25.

5 September 2024 Pacific Series	Vanuatu	0–3	Australia	Port Vila, Vanuatu
		Report	Blair 42'; Taylor 62'; Grimaldi 74'	Stadium: Freshwater Stadium; Referee: Ben Aukwai (Solomon Islands)

8 September 2024 Pacific Series	Vanuatu	0–4	Australia	Port Vila, Vanuatu
		Report	Bozinovski 45+1'; Vidic 69'; Matthews 71'; Priestman 79'	Stadium: Freshwater Stadium

5 June 2025 Korea Series	South Korea	0–0	Australia	Yongin, South Korea
19:00 UTC+9		Report		Stadium: Yongin Mireu Stadium

9 June 2025 Korea Series	South Korea	0–2	Australia	TBC, South Korea
TBC UTC+9		Report	Kuol; Lopane	Stadium: TBC

==== Doha International U-23 Cup ====
Australia were invited to take part in the Doha International U-23 Cup in March 2025, alongside Croatia (U-21 side), Egypt, Qatar, Thailand, and the United Arab Emirates (U-20 side). Australia finished the tournament in the third place in the overall standings with five points having won once and drawn twice with Qatar overtaking them due to goal difference and Croatia sitting top with six points.

19 March 2025 2025 Doha International U-23 Cup	Australia	2–1	Croatia	Al Rayyan, Qatar
20:30 UTC+3	Dukuly 54'; Adamson 90+1'	Report	Tunjić 56'	Stadium: Thani bin Jassim Stadium

22 March 2025 2025 Doha International U-23 Cup	United Arab Emirates	0–0	Australia	Al Khor, Qatar
20:30 UTC+3		Report		Stadium: Al-Khor Stadium

25 March 2025 2025 Doha International U-23 Cup	Qatar	2–2	Australia	Doha, Qatar
21:15 UTC+3	Al-Sharshani 76' (pen.); Gouda 90+2'	Report	Grimaldi 7'; Simmons 88'	Stadium: Abdullah bin Khalifa Stadium

=== Men's under-20 ===
==== Friendlies ====
The following is a list of friendlies played by the men's under-20 national team in 2024–25.

7 February 2025	Japan	2–1	Australia	Chiba, Japan
	Sato 11', 18'	Report	Jovanovic 39'	Stadium: Prince Takamado Memorial JFA YUME Field

6 June 2025	Argentina	2–1	Australia	Buenos Aires, Argentina
15:00 UTC−3	Sarco; Carrizo 90'	Result (FA); Report (MA)	Younis 16'	Stadium: Lionel Andres Messi Training Facility

9 June 2025	Argentina	2–0	Australia	Buenos Aires, Argentina
15:00 UTC−3	Subiabre; Sarco	Result (FA); Report (MA)		Stadium: Nuevo Gasómetro

==== ASEAN U-19 Boys Championship ====
18 July 2024 Group stage	Laos	0–6	Australia	Surabaya, Indonesia
15:00 WIB		Report	Sulemani 16', 25'; Younis 45+4', 73'; Najdovski 89', 90+4'	Stadium: Gelora 10 November Stadium; Referee: Songkran Bunmeekiart (Thailand)

21 July 2024 Group stage	Australia	6–2	Vietnam	Surabaya, Indonesia
15:00 WIB	Najdovski 19', 40', 66'; Sulemani 49'; Helweh 74'; Vickery 90+7'	Report	Dũng 57'; Long 86' (pen.)	Stadium: Gelora 10 November Stadium; Referee: Wiwat Jumpaoon (Thailand)

24 July 2024 Group stage	Myanmar	0–1	Australia	Surabaya, Indonesia
15:00 WIB		Report	Memeti 34'	Stadium: Gelora 10 November Stadium; Referee: Songkran Bunmeekiart (Thailand)

27 July 2024 Semi-final	Australia	0–1	Thailand	Surabaya, Indonesia
15:00 WIB		Report	Leonard 13' (o.g.)	Stadium: Gelora Bung Tomo Stadium; Referee: Razlan Joffri Ali (Malaysia)

29 July 2024 Third place match	Australia	1–1 (5–3 p)	Malaysia	Surabaya, Indonesia
15:00 WIB	Younis 28'	Report	Najdovski 73' (o.g.)	Stadium: Gelora Bung Tomo Stadium; Referee: Ngô Duy Lân (Vietnam)
	Penalties
	Memeti (penalty scored); Randazzo (penalty scored); Quintal (penalty scored); Bugarija (penalty scored); Helweh (penalty scored)		(penalty scored) Abid; (penalty scored) Pavithran; (penalty missed) Zachary; (penalty scored) Danish

==== AFC U-20 Asian Cup ====
After a draw with group leader Saudi Arabia in their last qualification match, the Young Socceroos finished second in the group and qualified for the final competition as one of the five best runners-up. By winning their quarter-final match in the final competition, Australia qualified for the 2025 FIFA U-20 World Cup in September 2025.

23 September 2024 Qualification stage	Afghanistan	0–2	Australia	Abha, Saudi Arabia
16:00 UTC+3		Report	Jovanovic 84', 90+3' (pen.)	Stadium: Prince Sultan bin Abdulaziz Sports City; Attendance: 50; Referee: Yousif Saeed Hasan (Iraq)

25 September 2024 Qualification stage	Australia	2–0	Macau	Abha, Saudi Arabia
16:00 UTC+3	Kikianis 9', 50'	Report		Stadium: Prince Sultan bin Abdulaziz Sports City; Attendance: 20; Referee: Sayyodjon Zayniddinov (Tajikistan)

27 September 2024 Qualification stage	Palestine	1–2	Australia	Abha, Saudi Arabia
16:00 UTC+3	Ali 7'	Report	Youlley 45+1'; Badolato 75'	Stadium: Prince Sultan bin Abdulaziz Sports City; Attendance: 40; Referee: Wissam Rabie (Syria)

29 September 2024 Qualification stage	Saudi Arabia	0–0	Australia	Abha, Saudi Arabia
20:00 UTC+3		Report		Stadium: Prince Sultan bin Abdulaziz Sports City; Referee: Sayyodjon Zayniddinov (Tajikistan)

12 February 2025 Group stage	Australia	5–1	Kyrgyzstan	Shenzhen, China
17:15 UTC+8	Jovanovic 4', 61'; Bennie 15'; Toure 26', 31'	Report	Almazbekov 73'	Stadium: Bao'an Stadium; Attendance: 655; Referee: Choi Hyun-jai (Korea Republic)

15 February 2025 Group stage	Qatar	1–3	Australia	Shenzhen, China
17:15 UTC+8	Gouda 19'	Report	Badolato 24'; Bosnjak 52'; Bennie 69'	Stadium: Shenzhen Youth Football Training Base Centre Stadium; Attendance: 1,072; Referee: Zaid Thamer Mohammed (Iraq)

18 February 2025 Group stage	China	1–2	Australia	Shenzhen, China
19:30 UTC+8	Kuai 29'	Report	Memeti 23'; Agosti 25'	Stadium: Bao'an Stadium; Attendance: 8,743; Referee: Abdullah Jamali (Kuwait)

22 February 2025 Quarter-final	Australia	3–2	Iraq	Bao'an Stadium, Shenzhen
19:30 UTC+8	Jovanovic 22'; Kikianis 62'; Badolato 74'	Report	Faisal 15'; Qabeel 26'	Attendance: 1,109; Referee: Ammar Mahfoodh (Bahrain)

26 February 2025 Semi-final	Australia	2–0	Japan	Bao'an Stadium, Shenzhen
19:30 UTC+8	Toure 49'; Pearman 67'	Report		Referee: Abdulhadi Al-Rowaily (Qatar)

1 March 2025 Final	Australia	1–1 (a.e.t.) (5–4 p)	Saudi Arabia	Bao'an Stadium, Shenzhen
19:30 UTC+8	Agosti 24'	Report	Haji 45+2'	Attendance: 3,355; Referee: Hiroki Kasahara (Japan)
	Penalties
	Jovanovic (penalty scored); Badolato (penalty scored); Pearman (penalty scored); Yull (penalty scored); Kikianis (penalty scored)		(penalty scored) Al-Khaibri; (penalty scored) Al-Shamrani; (penalty scored) Al-Mahdawi; (penalty scored) Barnawi; (penalty missed) Hazazi

==== Panda Cup ====
13 November 2024 2024 Panda Cup	Australia	4–2	Kyrgyzstan	Chengdu, China
15:30 UTC+8	Bugarija 21'; Bosnjak 31'; Pearman 36'; Toure 82'	Report	Abdirasulov 50'; Ernisov 70'	Stadium: Shuangliu Sports Centre

16 November 2024 2024 Panda Cup	China	1–1	Australia	Chengdu, China
19:35 UTC+8	Chen Zeshi 3'	Report	Bennie 23'	Stadium: Shuangliu Sports Centre

19 November 2024 2024 Panda Cup	Mongolia	0–10	Australia	Chengdu, China
14:00 UTC+8		Report	7' (pen.), 10', 26', 28', 42'; 53', 56', 74', 82', 83'	Stadium: Shuangliu Sports Centre

==== UEFA Friendship Cup ====
Australia was invited to play in the 2025 UEFA Friendship Cup, taking place in Nyon, Switzerland. Nominally an U18 competition, the cup is intended to offer early exposure for the U20 group of players to be involved in the 2027 FIFA U-20 World Cup qualification cycle.

1 June 2025	Australia	0–0 (3–4 p)	Argentina	Nyon, Switzerland
10:30 UTC+2		Report		Stadium: Colovray Sports Centre
	Penalties
	Brownlie (penalty missed); Overy (penalty scored); Crawford (penalty scored); Nkomo (penalty scored); Eames (penalty missed)		(penalty scored) Barbona; (penalty scored) Ponce; (penalty scored) Vaázquez; (penalty scored) Flamenco

4 June 2025	France	3–0	Australia	Nyon, Switzerland
15:30 UTC+2	Chauvin 36'; Baradji 75'; Nadir 78'	Report		Stadium: Colovray Sports Centre; Referee: Hüseyin Sanli (Switzerland)

7 June 2025	Australia	2–3	United States	Nyon, Switzerland
11:00 UTC+2	Memeti 75'; Brownlie 79'	Report		Stadium: Colovray Sports Centre

11 June 2025	Australia	4–1	Uruguay	Nyon, Switzerland
	Lopez 34', 69'; Memeti 61'; MacNicol 79'	Report	Herrington 89' (o.g.)	Stadium: Colovray Sports Centre

=== Women's under-20 ===
==== Friendlies ====
A two-game series against New Zealand was held to help preparations for the U-20 Women's World Cup. Following the World Cup, the team commenced a new cycle PacificAus Sports Four Nations Tournament.

11 July 2024	New Zealand	1–1	Australia	Wellington, New Zealand
14:30 UTC+12	Bercelli 20'	Report	Morris 59'	Stadium: Jerry Collins Stadium

14 July 2024	New Zealand	1–1	Australia	Wellington, New Zealand
14:30 UTC+12	Ingham	Report	Woods	Stadium: NZCIS; Attendance: 0 (behind closed doors)

23 August 2024	Nigeria	2–1	Australia	Bogotá, Colombia
--:-- UTC−5		Report		Stadium: Club Banco de la República

19 February 2025 PacificAus Sports Four Nations Tournament	Australia	9–0	Vanuatu	Canberra, Australia
15:00 UTC+11	Saveska 13', 17'; Kuilamu 30'; Allan 34'; Caspers 44'; Breier 50'; Lobo 63'; Stanic-Floody 72', 90+4'	Report		Stadium: Viking Park

22 February 2025 PacificAus Sports Four Nations Tournament	Australia	12–0	Solomon Islands	Canberra, Australia
18:30 UTC+11	McMahon 9', 23'; Trimis 27', 48', 65'; Collins 40', 51', 69'; Tallon-Henniker 54', 90+1'; Lobo 73'; Saveska 89'	Report		Stadium: Viking Park

25 February 2025 PacificAus Sports Four Nations Tournament	Australia	5–2	Thailand	Canberra, Australia
18:30 UTC+11	Saveska 10', 27' (pen.), 77'; ? 70' (o.g.); Tallon-Henniker 90+4'	Report	Casteen 19', 34'	Stadium: Deakin Stadium

==== FIFA U-20 Women's World Cup ====
31 August 2024 Group stage	Colombia	2–0	Australia	Bogotá, Colombia
18:00 UTC−5	Y. López 58'; Caicedo 76'	Report		Stadium: Estadio El Campín; Referee: Ivana Martinčić (Croatia)

3 September 2024 Group stage	Mexico	2–0	Australia	Bogotá, Colombia
17:00 UTC−5	Servín 57'; Lomelí 90+1'	Report		Stadium: Estadio El Campín

6 September 2024 Group stage	Australia	0–2	Cameroon	Bogotá, Colombia
17:00 UTC−5		Report	Toko Njoya 45+4'; Eto 61'	Stadium: Estadio El Campín; Referee: Natalie Simon (United States)

=== Men's under-17 ===
==== Friendlies ====
The following is a list of friendlies played by the men's under-17 national team in 2024–25.

15 August 2024 PacificAus Sports Tour	Solomon Islands	2–1	Australia	Honiara, Solomon Islands
18:00 UTC+11	Morgan 71'; Francis 78'	Report	Didulica 31'	Stadium: National Stadium

18 August 2024 PacificAus Sports Tour	Solomon Islands	1–4	Australia	Honiara, Solomon Islands
18:00 UTC+11	Morgan 88'	Report	Stevenson 13'; Naylor 16', 60'; Stanway 36'	Stadium: National Stadium; Attendance: 11,000

21 August 2024 PacificAus Sports Tour	Vanuatu	3–3	Australia	Port Vila, Vanuatu
15:00 UTC+11	Waute 53' (pen.), 68'; Loren 62'	Report	Sambrook 2'; ? 45+7' (o.g.); Stanway 82'	Stadium: Freshwater Stadium

20 February 2025 Hattrick U17 International Tournament	South Korea	1–2	Australia	Ras Al Khaimah, United Arab Emirates
13:00 UTC+4	57'	Report	MacNicol 34'; Anastasio 84'	Stadium: Ras Al-Khaimah Stadium

22 February 2025 Hattrick U17 International Tournament	Australia	4–0	Saudi Arabia	Ras Al Khaimah, United Arab Emirates
16:30 UTC+4	Anastasio 6'; Akol 31', 34', 45+1'	Report		Stadium: Ras Al-Khaimah Stadium

24 February 2025 Hattrick U17 International Tournament	Australia	1–1	Oman	Ras Al Khaimah, United Arab Emirates
13:00 UTC+4	Didulica 82'	Report	67'	Stadium: Ras Al-Khaimah Stadium

28 May 2025 Hohhot U16 tournament	Vietnam	1–2	Australia	Hohhot, China
14:00 UTC+8	Dai Nhan 45'	Report (FA); Report (Lao Dong)	Pavlovic 75'; Owusu 77'	Stadium: National Northern Football Training Base Stadium

30 May 2025 Hohhot U16 tournament	Australia	2–1	Saudi Arabia	Hohhot, China
14:00 UTC+8	Da Cruz 25'; Henrique 77'	Report	Goal	Stadium: National Northern Football Training Base Stadium

1 June 2025 Hohhot U16 tournament	China	5–2	Australia	Hohhot, China
19:35 UTC+8	Wan Xiang 9'; Shuai Weihao 39'; Liang Shiyu 71'; Zhang Bolin 81'; Xie Jin 83'	Report (FA); Report (Titan Sports)	Hassarati 2'; Li Junpeng 80' (o.g.)	Stadium: National Northern Football Training Base Stadium; Attendance: 17,511

==== ASEAN U-16 Boys Championship ====
23 June 2024 Group stage	Thailand	0–0	Australia	Surakarta, Indonesia
15:00 WIB		Report		Stadium: Sriwedari Stadium; Referee: Muhammad Zulfiqar (Singapore)

26 June 2024 Group stage	Australia	2–0	Malaysia	Surakarta, Indonesia
15:00 WIB	Tatu 45+5'; Williams 90+5'	Report		Stadium: Sriwedari Stadium; Referee: Clarence Leow Hong Wei (Singapore)

29 June 2024 Group stage	Timor-Leste	0–12	Australia	Surakarta, Indonesia
15:00 WIB		Report	J. Houridis 6', 23'; Didulica 8', 57', 78', 80'; Alfaro 47'; MacNicol 51', 58' (pen.), 63', 89'; Graoroski 54'	Stadium: Sriwedari Stadium; Referee: Muhammad Zulfiqar (Singapore)

1 July 2024 Semi-final	Indonesia	3–5	Australia	Surakarta, Indonesia
19:30 WIB	Gholy 3', 45+5'; Holong 90+3'	Report	Tatu 23', 66'; MacNicol 45+2'; Didulica 70', 86'	Stadium: Manahan Stadium

3 July 2024 Final	Thailand	1–1 (7–8 p)	Australia	Surakarta, Indonesia
19:30 WIB	Poramet 33'	Report	MacNicol 45+3'	Stadium: Manahan Stadium; Referee: Koji Takasaki (Japan)
	Penalties
	Poramet (penalty missed); Phuriphan (penalty scored); Phanuphong (penalty scored); Supakorn (penalty scored); Natthakit (penalty scored); Kittipob (penalty scored); Chaiwat (penalty scored); Siwakorn (penalty scored); Chatchawas (penalty missed)		(penalty scored) Alfaro; (penalty missed) MacNicol; (penalty scored) Maltz; (penalty scored) Didulica; (penalty scored) Eames; (penalty scored) Pullella; (penalty scored) Garbowski; (penalty scored) Kutleshi; (penalty scored) Necovski

==== AFC U-17 Asian Cup ====
After a draw with group leader Indonesia in their last qualification match, the Joeys topped their qualification group with a superior goal difference and qualified automatically for the final competition.

23 October 2024 Qualification stage	Australia	19–0	Northern Mariana Islands	Mishref, Kuwait
20:30 UTC+3	Tatu 4', 17'; Garbowski 11', 31'; MacNicol 18', 24', 70'; Didulica 25', 26', 38', 45+1', 58'; Anastasio 35', 49', 83'; Alfaro 37'; Maltz 60'; Naylor 69', 84'	Report		Stadium: Abdullah Alkhalifa Alsabah Stadium

25 October 2024 Qualification stage	Kuwait	1–3	Australia	Mishref, Kuwait
20:30 UTC+3	Al-Suwaidi 90+7'	Report	Tatu 21'; Parkin 85'; MacNicol 90+5'	Stadium: Abdullah Alkhalifa Alsabah Stadium; Referee: Doolotkeldi Uulu Seiit (Kyrgyzstan)

27 October 2024 Qualification stage	Australia	0–0	Indonesia	Mishref, Kuwait
17:30 UTC+3		Report		Stadium: Abdullah Alkhalifa Alsabah Stadium; Referee: Khalid Khallufah S Alahmari (Saudi Arabia)

4 April 2025 Group stage	Australia	1–1	Vietnam	Taif, Saudi Arabia
18:00 UTC+3	MacNicol 41'	Report	Hoàng Trọng Duy Khang 49'	Stadium: Okadh Sport Club Stadium; Referee: Kim Yu-jeong (South Korea)

7 April 2025 Group stage	United Arab Emirates	2–0	Australia	Taif, Saudi Arabia
20:15 UTC+3	Adel 9'; Buti 52'	Report		Stadium: King Fahd Sports City Stadium; Referee: Jin Jingyuan (China)

10 April 2025 Group stage	Japan	2–3	Australia	Taif, Saudi Arabia
18:00 UTC+3	Fujita 7'; Tani 86'	Report	Miliner 51'; Anastasio 71'; Garbowski 74'	Stadium: Okadh Sport Club Stadium; Referee: Dong Fangyu (China)

== AFC competitions ==
=== AFC Champions League Elite ===
Central Coast Mariners qualified to the League stage as Premiers in the 2023–24 A-League Men.

Pos	Team	Pld	W	D	L	GF	GA	GD	Pts	Qualification
8	(China) Shanghai Port	8	2	2	4	10	18	−8	8	Advance to round of 16
9	(South Korea) Pohang Steelers	7	2	0	5	9	17	−8	6	
10	(South Korea) Ulsan HD	7	1	0	6	4	16	−12	3	
11	(Australia) Central Coast Mariners	7	0	1	6	8	18	−10	1	
12	(China) Shandong Taishan	0	0	0	0	0	0	0	0	Withdrawn, record expunged (Note: Shandong Taishan were considered to have withdrawn from the AFC Champions League Elite after the club confirmed that it did not intend to report for their league stage match against Ulsan HD on 19 February 2025. Their remaining fixture was cancelled, with their seven played matches being expunged.)

Source: Asian Football Confederation
Rules for classification: 1) points; 2) goal difference; 3) number of goals scored; 4) number of matches won; 5) penalty shoot-out if only two teams remain tied and played each other on the final matchday 6) fair play ranking; 7) drawing of lots

=== AFC Champions League Two ===
Sydney FC qualified to the Group stage as winners of the 2023 Australia Cup.

Pos	Team	Pld	W	D	L	GF	GA	GD	Pts	Qualification
1	(Japan) Sanfrecce Hiroshima	6	5	1	0	14	5	+9	16	Advance to round of 16
2	(Australia) Sydney FC	6	4	0	2	17	6	+11	12	Advance to round of 16
3	(Philippines) Kaya–Iloilo	6	1	1	4	6	14	−8	4	
4	(Hong Kong) Eastern	6	1	0	5	7	19	−12	3	

Source: AFC
Rules for classification: Tiebreakers

==== Knockout stage ====
12 February 2025 Round of 16	Sydney FC (Australia)	2–2	(Thailand) Bangkok United	Sydney
	Segecic 60', 79'	Report	Živković 50' (pen.); Puangchan 90+6'	Stadium: Sydney Football Stadium; Referee: Yoshimi Yamashita (Japan)

19 February 2025 Round of 16	Bangkok United (Thailand)	2–3 (a.e.t.) (4–5 agg.)	(Australia) Sydney FC	Rangsit, Thailand
19:00 UTC+7	Al-Ghassani 18'; Eid 54'	Report	Lolley 2'; Segecic 88'; Costa 100'	Stadium: Thammasat Stadium

6 March 2025 Quarter-final	Jeonbuk Hyundai Motors (South Korea)	0–2	(Australia) Sydney FC	Jeonju, South Korea
19:00 UTC+9		Report	Klimala 36', 66'	Stadium: Jeonju World Cup Stadium; Attendance: 2,561; Referee: Asker Nadjafaliev (Uzbekistan)

13 March 2025 Quarter-final	Sydney FC (Australia)	3–2 (5–2 agg.)	(South Korea) Jeonbuk Hyundai Motors	Sydney
19:00 UTC+11	A. Grant 59'; Klimala 71'; Costa 82' (pen.)		Jeon Jin-woo 35', 45+4'	Stadium: Sydney Football Stadium; Referee: Abdulla Al Marri (Qatar)

9 April 2025 Semi-final	Lion City Sailors (Singapore)	2–0	(Australia) Sydney FC	Singapore
20:00 UTC+8	Ramselaar 18'; Thy 53'	Report		Stadium: Jalan Besar Stadium; Attendance: 4,213; Referee: Zaid Thamer Mohammed (Iraq)

16 April 2025 Semi-final	Sydney FC (Australia)	1–0 (1–2 agg.)	(Singapore) Lion City Sailors	Sydney
20:00 UTC+10	Lolley 85'	Report		Stadium: Sydney Football Stadium; Referee: Abdullah Jamali (Kuwait)

=== AFC Women's Champions League ===
Melbourne City qualified for the competition as Premiers of the 2023–24 A-League Women.

Pos	Team	Pld	W	D	L	GF	GA	GD	Pts	Qualification
1	(Australia) Melbourne City	3	3	0	0	9	1	+8	9	Advance to Quarter-finals
2	(Iran) Bam Khatoon	3	1	1	1	4	4	0	4	Advance to Quarter-finals
3	(Philippines) Kaya–Iloilo	3	0	2	1	1	5	−4	2	
4	(Thailand) College of Asian Scholars (H)	3	0	1	2	1	5	−4	1	

Source: AFC
Rules for classification: Tiebreakers
(H) Hosts

==== Knockout stage ====
23 March 2025 Quarter-final	Melbourne City (Australia)	3–0	(Chinese Taipei) Taichung Blue Whale	Melbourne, Australia
15:00 UTC+11	Speckmaier 4'; Li Pei-jung 43' (o.g.); McNamara 63'	Report		Stadium: Melbourne Rectangular Stadium; Attendance: 1,865; Referee: Kim Yu-jeong (South Korea)

21 May 2025 Semi-final	Incheon Red Angels (South Korea)	0–1	(Australia) Melbourne City	Wuhan, China
20:00 UTC+8		Report	McMahon 90+4'	Stadium: Wuhan Sports Center; Attendance: 706; Referee: Pansa Chaisanit (Thailand)

24 May 2025 Final	Melbourne City (Australia)	1–1 (a.e.t.) (4–5 p)	(China) Wuhan Jiangda	Wuhan, China
20:00 UTC+8	McMahon 76'	Report	Wang Shuang 90+8' (pen.)	Stadium: Wuhan Sports Center; Attendance: 18,715; Referee: Asaka Koizumi (Japan)
	Penalties
	McMahon (penalty scored); McKenna (penalty scored); Otto (penalty scored); Speckmaier (penalty scored); Stott (penalty missed); Henry (penalty missed)		(penalty scored) Yao Wei; (penalty scored) Wu Haiyan; (penalty scored) Mengyi; (penalty missed) Song Duan; (penalty scored) Wang Shuang; (penalty scored) Zhao Yuxin

== Domestic leagues ==
=== A-League Men ===
Pos	Team	Pld	W	D	L	GF	GA	GD	Pts	Qualification
1	Auckland FC (Note: Auckland FC and Wellington Phoenix cannot qualify for Asian Football Confederation competitions as they are based in New Zealand, which is part of the Oceania Football Confederation.)	26	15	8	3	49	27	+22	53	Qualification for Finals series (Note: The top two teams enter the finals series at the semi-finals, while the teams ranked third to sixth enter the finals series at the elimination-finals.)
2	Melbourne City (C)	26	14	6	6	41	25	+16	48	Qualification for AFC Champions League Elite and Finals series
3	Western United	26	14	5	7	55	37	+18	47	Qualification for Finals series
4	Western Sydney Wanderers	26	13	7	6	58	40	+18	46	Qualification for Finals series
5	Melbourne Victory	26	12	7	7	44	36	+8	43	Qualification for Finals series
6	Adelaide United	26	10	8	8	53	55	−2	38	Qualification for Finals series
7	Sydney FC	26	10	7	9	53	46	+7	37	
8	Macarthur FC	26	9	6	11	50	45	+5	33	Qualification for AFC Champions League Two (Note: Qualified for AFC Champions League Two as the 2024 Australia Cup winners.)
9	Newcastle Jets	26	8	6	12	43	44	−1	30	
10	Central Coast Mariners	26	5	11	10	29	51	−22	26	Qualification for 2025 Australia Cup play-offs
11	Wellington Phoenix	26	6	6	14	27	43	−16	24	Qualification for 2025 Australia Cup play-offs
12	Brisbane Roar	26	5	6	15	32	51	−19	21	Qualification for 2025 Australia Cup play-offs
13	Perth Glory	26	4	5	17	22	56	−34	17	Qualification for 2025 Australia Cup play-offs

Source: A-Leagues
Rules for classification: 1) points; 2) goal difference; 3) goals scored; 4) wins; 5) head-to-head results; 5a) head-to-head points; 5b) head-to-head goal difference; 6) Fair Play points; 7) away goal difference; 8) away goals per match; 9) home goal difference; 10) home goals per match; 11) toss of a coin in an event of a tie of two clubs.
(C) Champions

==== Finals series ====
Elimination finals
4	Western Sydney Wanderers	1
5	Melbourne Victory	2
3	Western United	3
6	Adelaide United	2

Semi-finals
1	Auckland FC	1	0	1
5	Melbourne Victory	0	2	2
2	Melbourne City	3	1	4
3	Western United	0	1	1

Grand Final
2	Melbourne City	1
5	Melbourne Victory	0

=== A-League Women ===
Pos	Team	Pld	W	D	L	GF	GA	GD	Pts	Qualification
1	Melbourne City	23	16	7	0	56	22	+34	55	Qualification for AFC Women's Champions League and Finals series
2	Melbourne Victory	23	16	5	2	42	21	+21	53	Qualification for Finals series
3	Adelaide United	23	14	3	6	44	30	+14	45	Qualification for Finals series
4	Central Coast Mariners (C)	23	9	7	7	31	25	+6	34	Qualification for Finals series
5	Canberra United	23	9	6	8	28	31	−3	33	Qualification for Finals series
6	Western United	23	9	6	8	39	46	−7	33	Qualification for Finals series
7	Brisbane Roar	23	8	2	13	46	42	+4	26	
8	Sydney FC	23	7	4	12	23	29	−6	25	
9	Wellington Phoenix (Note: Wellington Phoenix cannot qualify for the AFC Women's Champions League as they are based in New Zealand, which is part of the Oceania Football Confederation.)	23	7	3	13	25	30	−5	24	
10	Perth Glory	23	6	4	13	27	43	−16	22	
11	Newcastle Jets	23	5	5	13	29	53	−24	20	
12	Western Sydney Wanderers	23	4	4	15	28	46	−18	16	

Source: A-Leagues
Rules for classification: 1) points; 2) goal difference; 3) goals scored; 4) wins; 5) head-to-head results; 5a) head-to-head points; 5b) head-to-head goal difference; 6) Fair Play points; 7) away goal difference; 8) away goals per match; 9) home goal difference; 10) home goals per match; 11) toss of a coin in an event of a tie of two clubs.
(C) Champions

==== Finals series ====
Elimination-finals
4	Central Coast Mariners	2
5	Canberra United	1
3	Adelaide United	1
6	Western United	0

Semi-finals
1	Melbourne City	2	0	2
4	Central Coast Mariners (a.e.t.)	2	1	3
2	Melbourne Victory	3	3	6
3	Adelaide United	1	1	2

Grand Final
4	Central Coast Mariners	1 (5)
2	Melbourne Victory	1 (4)

== Domestic cups ==
=== Australia Cup ===
Round of 32
Moreton City Excelsior	5
Campbelltown City	1
Perth Glory (a.e.t.)	5
Melbourne City	4
NWS Spirit	3
Glenorchy Knights	0
Lambton Jaffas	1
Melbourne Victory	4
Olympic Kingsway	4
Edgeworth Eagles	1
Blacktown City	2
Adelaide United (a.e.t.)	3
Perth RedStar	1
Lions FC	4
Brisbane City	1
Western Sydney Wanderers	2
Darwin Hearts	0
Hume City	6
Melbourne Srbija (p)	1 (4)
Modbury Jets	1 (1)
South Melbourne	1
Wellington Phoenix	0
Olympic FC (a.e.t.)	1
APIA Leichhardt	0
Oakleigh Cannons	3
Sydney FC	1
Heidelberg United (a.e.t.)	3
Central Coast Mariners	1
Rockdale Ilinden	1
Newcastle Jets	2
O'Connor Knights	1
Macarthur FC	2

Round of 16
Moreton City Excelsior	3
Perth Glory	2
NWS Spirit	0
Melbourne Victory	4
Olympic Kingsway	2
Adelaide United	3
Lions FC	0
Western Sydney Wanderers	4
Hume City	1
Melbourne Srbija	0
South Melbourne (a.e.t.)	3
Olympic FC	2
Oakleigh Cannons (p)	1 (4)
Heidelberg United	1 (1)
Newcastle Jets	3
Macarthur FC	4

Quarter-finals
Moreton City Excelsior	0
Melbourne Victory	4
Adelaide United (a.e.t.)	2
Western Sydney Wanderers	1
Hume City	2
South Melbourne (a.e.t.)	3
Oakleigh Cannons	0
Macarthur FC	1

Semi-finals
Melbourne Victory	1
Adelaide United	0
South Melbourne	0
Macarthur FC	1

Final
Melbourne Victory	0
Macarthur FC	1

==== Final ====
29 September 2024
19:10 AEST

Melbourne Victory	0–1	Macarthur FC
	Report	Jakoliš 58'

AAMI Park, Melbourne
Attendance: 13,289
Referee: Jonathan Barreiro

== Deaths ==
- 19 August 2024: Jimmy Armstrong, 81, Australia, Melbourne Hakoah, South Melbourne, Brunswick Juventus, Shepparton United, Morwell Falcons, and Sandringham City forward.
- 6 October 2024: Johan Neeskens, 73, assistant coach of Australia.
- 31 March 2025: Glenn Ahearn, 62, Australia, Sydney City, and Brisbane City goalkeeper.

== Retirements ==
- After the Paris Olympics tournament: Lydia Williams, 36, former Matildas goalkeeper, retired from international football.
- 9 August 2024: Ivan Franjic, 36, former Australia, St Albans Saints, Melbourne Knights, Oakleigh Cannons, Brisbane Roar, Melbourne City, Perth Glory, Macarthur FC, Caroline Springs George Cross, and Heidelberg United defender.
- 17 August 2024: Morgan Schneiderlin, 34, former France and Western Sydney Wanderers midfielder.
- 22 September 2024: Lauren Keir, 27, former Canberra United and Western Sydney Wanderers defender.
- 10 October 2024: Elise Kellond-Knight, 34, former Australia, Brisbane Roar, Melbourne City, and Melbourne Victory defender.
- 16 October 2024: Hannah Wilkinson, 32, former New Zealand and Melbourne City forward.
- 17 November 2024: Oliver Bozanic, 35, former Australia, Central Coast Mariners, Melbourne Victory, Melbourne City, Western Sydney Wanderers, and Perth Glory midfielder.
- 1 December 2024: Clare Polkinghorne, 35, former Matildas defender, retiring from international football.
- 9 December 2024: Nani, 38, former Portugal and Melbourne Victory winger.
- 28 December 2024: Beattie Goad, 27, former Matildas, Melbourne Victory, and Melbourne City midfielder.
- 31 January 2025: Scott Neville, 36, former Perth Glory, Newcastle Jets, Western Sydney Wanderers, and Brisbane Roar defender.
- 6 February 2025: Jamie Young, 39, former Brisbane Roar, Western United, and Melbourne City goalkeeper.
- 19 April 2025: Mariel Hecher, 32, former Lions FC and Brisbane Roar forward.
- 19 April 2025: Keeley Richards, 30, former Canberra United and Brisbane Roar goalkeeper.
- 20 April 2025: Annalie Longo, 33, former New Zealand, Sydney FC, Melbourne Victory, and Wellington Phoenix midfielder.
- 10 May 2025: Matthew Trott, 39, former Central Coast Lightning, Central Coast Mariners, and Maitland goalkeeper.
- 13 May 2025: Isaías, 38, former Adelaide United midfielder.
- 13 May 2025: Javi López, 39, former Adelaide United defender.
- 23 May 2025: Maruschka Waldus, 32, former Western Sydney Wanderers and Adelaide United defender.
