= 2023–24 in Australian soccer =

55th season of national competitive soccer in Australia

Soccer in Australia
- Season: 2023–24

Men's soccer
- ALM Premiership: Central Coast Mariners
- Australia Cup: Sydney FC

Women's soccer
- ALW Premiership: Melbourne City
- ALW Championship: Sydney FC

The 2023–24 season was the 55th season of national competitive Soccer in Australia and 141st overall.

== National teams ==
=== Men's senior ===
==== Friendlies ====
The following is a list of friendlies played by the men's senior national team in 2023–24.

9 September 2023	Mexico	2–2	Australia	Arlington, United States
21:00 UTC-5	Jiménez 69' (pen.); Huerta 83'	Report	Souttar 16'; Boyle 63' (pen.)	Stadium: AT&T Stadium; Referee: Rubio Vázquez (United States)

13 October 2023	England	1–0	Australia	London, England
19:45 UTC+1	Watkins 57'	Report		Stadium: Wembley Stadium; Attendance: 81,116; Referee: Stéphanie Frappart (France)

17 October 2023 Soccer Ashes	Australia	2–0	New Zealand	London, England
19:45 UTC+1	Souttar 13'; Irvine 76'	Report		Stadium: Gtech Community Stadium; Attendance: 5,761; Referee: Stuart Attwell (England)

6 January 2024	Bahrain	0–2	Australia	Abu Dhabi, United Arab Emirates
18:00 UTC+4		Report	Binaddi 36' (o.g.); Duke 61'	Stadium: Baniyas Stadium; Referee: Mohamed Al-Harmoodi (United Arab Emirates)

==== FIFA World Cup qualification ====
===== Second round =====
====== Group I ======
Pos	Team	Pld	W	D	L	GF	GA	GD	Pts	Qualification	(Australia)	(Palestine)	(Lebanon)	(Bangladesh)
1	Australia	6	6	0	0	22	0	+22	18	World Cup qualifying third round and Asian Cup	—	5–0	2–0	7–0
2	Palestine	6	2	2	2	6	6	0	8	World Cup qualifying third round and Asian Cup	0–1	—	0–0	5–0
3	Lebanon	6	1	3	2	5	8	−3	6	Asian Cup qualifying third round	0–5	0–0	—	4–0
4	Bangladesh	6	0	1	5	1	20	−19	1	Asian Cup qualifying third round	0–2	0–1	1–1	—

Source: FIFA, AFC
Rules for classification: Tiebreakers

16 November 2023 Second round	Australia	7–0	Bangladesh	Melbourne, Australia
20:00 UTC+11	Souttar 4'; Borrello 20'; Duke 37', 40'; Maclaren 48', 70', 84'	Report		Stadium: AAMI Park; Attendance: 20,876; Referee: Ahrol Risqullaev (Uzbekistan)

21 November 2023 Second round	Palestine	0–1	Australia	Kuwait City, Kuwait (Note: Palestine played their home game at a neutral venue due to the ongoing Gaza war.)
17:00 UTC+3		Report	Souttar 18'	Stadium: Jaber Al-Ahmad International Stadium; Attendance: 14,537; Referee: Qasim Al-Hatmi (Oman)

21 March 2024 Second round	Australia	2–0	Lebanon	Sydney, Australia
20:10 UTC+11	Baccus 5'; Rowles 54'	Report		Stadium: CommBank Stadium; Attendance: 27,026; Referee: Khamis Al-Marri (Qatar)

26 March 2024 Second round	Lebanon	0–5	Australia	Canberra, Australia (Note: Lebanon played their home game in Australia due to the ongoing Gaza war.)
19:45 UTC+11		Report	Yengi 2'; Jradi 47' (o.g.); Goodwin 48', 81'; Iredale 68'	Stadium: Canberra Stadium; Attendance: 25,023; Referee: Mooud Bonyadifard (Iran)

6 June 2024 Second round	Bangladesh	0–2	Australia	Dhaka, Bangladesh
16:45 UTC+6		Report	Hrustic 29'; Yengi 62'	Stadium: Bashundhara Kings Arena; Attendance: 5,227; Referee: Jansen Foo (Singapore)

11 June 2024 Second round	Australia	5–0	Palestine	Perth, Australia
20:05 UTC+8	Yengi 5' (pen.), 41'; Taggart 26'; Boyle 53'; Irankunda 87' (pen.)	Report		Stadium: HBF Park; Attendance: 18,261; Referee: Khalid Al-Turais (Saudi Arabia)

==== AFC Asian Cup ====
===== Group B =====
Pos	Team	Pld	W	D	L	GF	GA	GD	Pts	Qualification
1	Australia	3	2	1	0	4	1	+3	7	Advance to knockout stage
2	Uzbekistan	3	1	2	0	4	1	+3	5	Advance to knockout stage
3	Syria	3	1	1	1	1	1	0	4	Advance to knockout stage
4	India	3	0	0	3	0	6	−6	0	

Source: AFC
Rules for classification: Group stage tiebreakers

13 January 2024 Group stage	Australia	2–0	India	Doha, Qatar
14:30 UTC+3	Irvine 50'; Bos 73'	Report		Stadium: Ahmad bin Ali Stadium; Attendance: 35,253; Referee: Yoshimi Yamashita (Japan)

18 January 2024 Group stage	Syria	0–1	Australia	Doha, Qatar
14:30 UTC+3		Report	Irvine 59'	Stadium: Jassim bin Hamad Stadium; Attendance: 10,097; Referee: Adel Al-Naqbi (United Arab Emirates)

23 January 2024 Group stage	Australia	1–1	Uzbekistan	Doha, Qatar
14:30 UTC+3	Boyle 45+1' (pen.)	Report	Turgunboev 78'	Stadium: Al Janoub Stadium; Attendance: 15,290; Referee: Yusuke Araki (Japan)

===== Knockout stage =====
28 January 2024 Round of 16	Australia	4–0	Indonesia	Al Rayyan, Qatar
14:30 UTC+3	Baggott 12' (o.g.); Boyle 45'; Goodwin 89'; Souttar 90+1'	Report		Stadium: Jassim bin Hamad Stadium; Attendance: 7,863; Referee: Mohammed Abdulla Hassan Mohamed (United Arab Emirates)

2 February 2024 Quarter-finals	Australia	1–2 (a.e.t.)	South Korea	Al Wakrah, Qatar
18:30 UTC+3	Goodwin 42'	Report	H.C. Hwang 90+6' (pen.); Son 104'	Stadium: Al Janoub Stadium; Attendance: 39,632; Referee: Ahmed Al-Kaf (Oman)

=== Men's under-23 ===
==== Friendlies ====
The following is a list of friendlies played by the men's under-23 national team in 2023–24.

17 November 2023	Qatar	1–2	Australia	Khobar, Saudi Arabia
19:00 AST	El Sayed 45+1'	Report	Toure 27'; Brook 40'	Stadium: Prince Saud bin Jalawi Stadium

21 November 2023	Saudi Arabia	1–3	Australia	Khobar, Saudi Arabia
16:00 AST	Bahusayn 90+5'	Report	Botic 12', 36'; Velupillay 43'	Stadium: Prince Saud bin Jalawi Stadium

==== WAFF U-23 Championship ====
As part of their preparations for the AFC U-23 Asian Cup, Australia accepted an invitation to participate in the WAFF U-23 Championship.

20 March 2024 Group stage	Australia	2–1	Iraq	Hofuf, Saudi Arabia
20:00 AST	D'Arrigo 10'; A. Kuol 15'	Report	Jaafar 48'	Stadium: Prince Abdullah bin Jalawi Stadium

23 March 2024 Semi-final	Australia	1–1 (2–1 p)	Egypt	Hofuf, Saudi Arabia
23:00 AST	G. Kuol 15' (pen.)	Report	J. Hollman 22' (o.g.)	Stadium: Prince Abdullah bin Jalawi Stadium
	Penalties
	Courtney-Perkins (penalty missed); Okon-Engstler (penalty missed); Girdwood-Reich (penalty scored); Velupillay (penalty missed); Brook (penalty scored)		(penalty missed) Adel; (penalty missed) Faisal; (penalty scored) El Debes; (penalty missed) El Saaiy; (penalty missed) Eid

26 March 2024 Final	Australia	2–2 (3–4 p)	South Korea	Al Mubarraz, Saudi Arabia
23:00 AST	A. Kuol 11', 72'	Report	Lee Young-jun 26'; Kang Seong-jin 62'	Stadium: Al Fateh Stadium
	Penalties
	A. Kuol (penalty scored); Italiano (penalty scored); D'Arrigo (penalty scored); J. Hollman (penalty missed); G. Kuol (penalty missed)		(penalty scored) Lee Tae-seok; (penalty scored) Lee Kang-hee; (penalty scored) An Jae-jun; (penalty scored) Seo Myung-guan

==== AFC U-23 Asian Cup ====
6 September 2023 Qualification stage	Laos	1–7	Australia	Dushanbe, Tajikistan
20:30	Khounthoumphone 12'	Report	Velupillay 2', 4'; D'Arrigo 7'; Botic 21', 55'; Brook 59'; A. Kuol 79'	Stadium: Central Republican Stadium; Attendance: 200; Referee: Ahmad Alaeddin (Lebanon)

12 September 2023 Qualification stage	Tajikistan	1–1	Australia	Dushanbe, Tajikistan
20:30	Soirov 28'	Report	Peupion 12'	Stadium: Central Republican Stadium; Attendance: 12,400; Referee: Rowan Arumughan (India)

15 April 2024 Group stage	Australia	0–0	Jordan	Doha, Qatar
16:00 AST		Report		Stadium: Abdullah bin Khalifa Stadium; Referee: Hiroyuki Kimura (Japan)

18 April 2024 Group stage	Indonesia	1–0	Australia	Doha, Qatar
16:00 AST	Komang 45'	Report		Stadium: Abdullah bin Khalifa Stadium; Referee: Majed Al-Shamrani (Saudi Arabia)

21 April 2024 Group stage	Qatar	0–0	Australia	Al Rayyan, Qatar
18:30 AST		Report		Stadium: Jassim bin Hamad Stadium; Referee: Rustam Lutfullin (Uzbekistan)

=== Men's under-20 ===
==== Friendlies ====
The following is a list of friendlies played by the men's under-20 national team in 2023–24.

5 June 2024 South American Tour	Uruguay	3–3 (4–3 p)	Australia	Montevideo, Uruguay
10:00 UYT	Lavega (?); Pino 95' (pen.)	Report	Caputo 25', 32'; Badolato 31'	Stadium: Complejo Uruguay Celeste; Attendance: 0 (behind closed doors)

8 June 2024 South American Tour	Chile	2–2 (5–4 p)	Australia	La Calera, Chile
16:00 CLT	Loyola 16'; Arce 64'	Report	Yull; Youlley	Stadium: Estadio Municipal Nicolás Chahuán Nazar

11 June 2024 South American Tour	Chile	2–1	Australia	Santiago, Chile
17:00 CLT	Pinto; Margas	Report	Jovanovic	Stadium: ANFP Federacion de Futbol de Chile

==== Marbella Week of Football U-18 International Tournament ====
The Young Socceroos participated in the Marbella Week of Football U-18 International Tournament in Spain.

12 October 2023	Australia	1–1 (4–1 p)	France	Marbella, Spain
14:00 CEST	Brandtman 8'	Report	Kalambayi 40'	Stadium: Marbella Football Centre

14 October 2023	Australia	1–1 (6–5 p)	Netherlands	Marbella, Spain
19:00 CEST	Waddingham 58'	Report (FA); Report (KNVB)	Milambo	Stadium: Marbella Football Centre

17 October 2023	Australia	2–2 (7–6 p)	Denmark	Marbella, Spain
14:30 CEST	Waddingham 18'; Brandtman 87'	Report	Goal	Stadium: Marbella Football Centre

=== Men's under-17 ===
==== Friendlies ====
The following is a list of friendlies played by the men's under-17 national team in 2023–24.

11 April 2024 European camp	Switzerland	3–4	Australia	Locarno, Switzerland
13:00 (CET)	Lebrino 6'; Mahic 120+1', 102+5'	Report	MacNicol 9', 55'; Tatu 72'; Bolongi 107'	Stadium: Stadio Communale Ascona
Note: Match took place over four quarters of 30-minutes each

16 April 2024 European camp	Inter Milan U-17 (Italy)	4–2	Australia	Milan, Italy
15:00 (CET)	27'; 40'; 45'; 73'	Report	MacNicol 10'; Pullella 30'	Stadium: Konami Youth Development Centre

==== ASEAN U-16 Boys Championship ====
23 June 2024 Group stage	Thailand	0–0	Australia	Surakarta, Indonesia
15:00 WIB		Report		Stadium: Sriwedari Stadium; Referee: Muhammad Zulfiqar (Singapore)

26 June 2024 Group stage	Australia	2–0	Malaysia	Surakarta, Indonesia
15:00 WIB	Tatu 45+5'; Williams 90+5'	Report		Stadium: Sriwedari Stadium; Referee: Clarence Leow Hong Wei (Singapore)

29 June 2024 Group stage	Timor-Leste	0–12	Australia	Surakarta, Indonesia
15:00 WIB		Report	J. Houridis 6', 23'; Didulica 8', 57', 78', 80'; Alfaro 47'; MacNicol 51', 58' (pen.), 63', 89'; Graoroski 54'	Stadium: Sriwedari Stadium; Referee: Muhammad Zulfiqar (Singapore)

1 July 2024 Semi-final	Indonesia	3–5	Australia	Surakarta, Indonesia
19:30 WIB	Gholy 3', 45+5'; Holong 90+3'	Report	Tatu 23', 66'; MacNicol 45+2'; Didulica 70', 86'	Stadium: Manahan Stadium

3 July 2024 Final	Thailand	1–1 (7–8 p)	Australia	Surakarta, Indonesia
19:30 WIB	Poramet 33'	Report	MacNicol 45+3'	Stadium: Manahan Stadium; Referee: Koji Takasaki (Japan)
	Penalties
	Poramet (penalty missed); Phuriphan (penalty scored); Phanuphong (penalty scored); Supakorn (penalty scored); Natthakit (penalty scored); Kittipob (penalty scored); Chaiwat (penalty scored); Siwakorn (penalty scored); Chatchawas (penalty missed)		(penalty scored) Alfaro; (penalty missed) MacNicol; (penalty scored) Maltz; (penalty scored) Didulica; (penalty scored) Eames; (penalty scored) Pullella; (penalty scored) Garbowski; (penalty scored) Kutleshi; (penalty scored) Necovski

=== Women's senior ===
==== Friendlies ====
The following is a list of friendlies played by the women's senior national team in 2023–24.

14 July 2023	Australia	1–0	France	Melbourne, Australia
19:30 UTC+10	Fowler 66'	Report		Stadium: Marvel Stadium; Attendance: 50,629; Referee: Asaka Koizumi (Japan)

1 December 2023	Canada	5–0	Australia	Langford, Canada
19:30 UTC−8	Prince 10', 43'; Lacasse 49'; Awujo 55'; Leon 62'	Report		Stadium: Starlight Stadium; Attendance: 6,102; Referee: Deily Gómez (Costa Rica)

5 December 2023	Canada	1–0	Australia	Vancouver, Canada
19:00 UTC−8	Quinn 40'	Report		Stadium: Christine Sinclair Place; Attendance: 48,112; Referee: Katja Koroleva (United States)

9 April 2024	Mexico	0–2	Australia	San Antonio, United States
19:00 UTC−6		Report	Raso 9'; Foord 52'	Stadium: Toyota Field; Attendance: 7,163; Referee: Natalie Simon (United States)

31 May 2024	Australia	1–1	China	Adelaide, Australia
19:40 UTC+09:30	Heyman 90+5'	Report	Zhang 30'	Stadium: Adelaide Oval; Attendance: 52,912; Referee: Kim Yu-jeong (South Korea)

3 June 2024	Australia	2–0	China	Sydney, Australia
19:30 UTC+10:00	Wheeler 48'; Raso 56'	Report		Stadium: Accor Stadium; Attendance: 76,798; Referee: Oh Hyun-jung (South Korea)

==== FIFA Women's World Cup ====
===== Group B =====
Pos	Team	Pld	W	D	L	GF	GA	GD	Pts	Qualification
1	Australia (H)	3	2	0	1	7	3	+4	6	Advance to knockout stage
2	Nigeria	3	1	2	0	3	2	+1	5	Advance to knockout stage
3	Canada	3	1	1	1	2	5	−3	4	
4	Republic of Ireland	3	0	1	2	1	3	−2	1	

Source: FIFA
Rules for classification: Group stage tiebreakers
(H) Hosts

20 July 2023 Group Stage	Australia	1–0	Republic of Ireland	Sydney, Australia
18:00 UTC+10	Catley 52' (pen.)	Report		Stadium: Stadium Australia; Attendance: 75,784; Referee: Edina Alves Batista (Brazil)

27 July 2023 Group Stage	Australia	2–3	Nigeria	Brisbane, Australia
18:00 UTC+10	Van Egmond 45+1'; Kennedy 90+10'	Report	Kanu 45+6'; Ohale 65'; Oshoala 72'	Stadium: Lang Park; Attendance: 49,156; Referee: Esther Staubli (Switzerland)

31 July 2023 Group Stage	Canada	0–4	Australia	Melbourne, Australia
18:00 UTC+10		Report	Raso 9', 39'; Fowler 58'; Catley 90+4' (pen.)	Stadium: Melbourne Rectangular Stadium; Attendance: 27,706; Referee: Stéphanie Frappart (France)

7 August 2023 Round of 16	Australia	2–0	Denmark	Sydney, Australia
20:30 UTC+10	Foord 29'; Raso 70'	Report		Stadium: Stadium Australia; Attendance: 75,784; Referee: Rebecca Welch (England)

12 August 2023 Quarter-final	Australia	0–0 (a.e.t.) (7–6 p)	France	Brisbane, Australia
17:00 UTC+10		Report		Stadium: Lang Park; Attendance: 49,461; Referee: María Carvajal (Chile)
	Penalties
	Foord (penalty scored); Catley (penalty missed); Kerr (penalty scored); Fowler (penalty scored); Arnold (penalty missed); Gorry (penalty scored); Yallop (penalty scored); Carpenter (penalty scored); Hunt (penalty missed); Vine (penalty scored)		(penalty missed) Bacha; (penalty scored) Diani; (penalty scored) Renard; (penalty scored) Le Sommer; (penalty missed) Périsset; (penalty scored) Geyoro; (penalty scored) Karchaoui; (penalty scored) Lakrar; (penalty missed) Dali; (penalty missed) Bècho

16 August 2023 Semi-final	Australia	1–3	England	Sydney, Australia
20:00 UTC+10	Kerr 63'	Report	Toone 36'; Hemp 71'; Russo 86'	Stadium: Stadium Australia; Attendance: 75,784; Referee: Tori Penso (United States)

19 August 2023 Third place play-off	Sweden	2–0	Australia	Brisbane, Australia
18:00 UTC+10	Rolfö 30' (pen.); Asllani 62'	Report		Stadium: Lang Park; Attendance: 49,461; Referee: Cheryl Foster (Wales)

==== 2024 Paris Olympic qualifiers ====
26 October 2023 Round 2	Australia	2–0	Iran	Perth, Australia
19:00 UTC+8	Carpenter 19'; Kerr 78'	Report		Stadium: Perth Rectangular Stadium; Attendance: 18,798; Referee: Oh Hyeon-jeong (South Korea)

29 October 2023 Round 2	Philippines	0–8	Australia	Perth, Australia
15:10 UTC+8		Report	Fowler 15'; Kerr 19', 45+2', 46'; Foord 30', 34', 56'; Wheeler 72'	Stadium: Perth Stadium; Attendance: 59,155; Referee: Ranjita Devi Tekcham (India)

1 November 2023 Round 2	Australia	3–0	Chinese Taipei	Perth, Australia
19:00 UTC+8	Fowler 62'; Kerr 68'; Yallop 76'	Report		Stadium: Perth Rectangular Stadium; Attendance: 19,084; Referee: Oh Hyeon-jeong (South Korea)

24 February 2024 Round 3	Uzbekistan	0–3	Australia	Tashkent, Uzbekistan
14:00 UTC+5		Report	Heyman 72'; Fowler 84'; Foord 86'	Stadium: Milliy Stadium; Referee: Oh Hyeon-jeong (South Korea)

28 February 2024 Round 3	Australia	10–0 (13–0 agg.)	Uzbekistan	Melbourne, Australia
20:00 UTC+11	Asadova 1' (o.g.); Heyman 4', 8', 16', 45+2'; Torpey 22'; Fowler 36'; Foord 38'; Raso 68'; Sayer 90+4'	Report		Stadium: Marvel Stadium; Attendance: 54,120; Referee: Yoshimi Yamashita (Japan)

=== Women's under-23 ===
==== Friendlies ====
The following is a list of friendlies played by the women's under-23 national team in 2023–24.

26 September 2023	Australia	1–0	Scotland	Varese, Italy
11:30 CEST	Doran	Report		Stadium: AIS European Training Centre

29 May 2024 Four Nations Tournament	Sweden	3–0	Australia	Växjö, Sweden
19:00 CEST	Renmark 11', 31'; Handfast 41'	Report		Stadium: Visma Arena

1 June 2024 Four Nations Tournament	Australia	0–3	Germany	Växjö, Sweden
18:00 CEST		Report	Apostolakis 30' (o.g.); #10 48'; #2 60'	Stadium: Värendsvallen

4 June 2024 Four Nations Tournament	Australia	2–2 (5–3 p)	Poland	Växjö, Sweden
13:00 CEST	Cerne 60'; Margraf 75'	Report	Krezyman 24'; Wróbel 55'	Stadium: Värendsvallen; Referee: Isabelle Svensson (Sweden)
	Penalties
	Gomez (penalty scored); Lowry (penalty scored); Hollman (penalty scored); Nash (penalty scored); Margraf (penalty scored)		(penalty scored) Grzybowska; (penalty scored) Domin; (penalty scored) Dudziak; (penalty missed) Kaczor

=== Women's under-20 ===
==== Friendlies ====
A two-game series against China was held to help preparations for the U-20 Women's Asian Cup.

3 December 2023	China	1–3	Australia	Xiamen, China
15:00 UTC+8	Zheng 83' (pen.)	Report	Galic 10'; Grove 66'; O'Grady 68'	Stadium: Xiamen Egret Stadium; Referee: Dai Bingyue (China)

6 December 2023	China	3–1	Australia	Xiamen, China
13:00 UTC+8	Zhang 6'; Yu 66', 85'	Report	Apostolakis 89'	Stadium: Xiamen Egret Stadium; Referee: Mu Mingxin (China)

==== AFC U-20 Women's Asian Cup ====
With three wins in the group stage, Australia secured qualification to the 2024 FIFA U-20 Women's World Cup.

3 March 2024 Group stage	South Korea	1–2	Australia	Tashkent, Uzbekistan
13:00 UTC+5	Jeon 25'	Report	Trimis 73'; Thomas-Chinnama 90'	Stadium: Do'stlik Stadium; Attendance: 40; Referee: Asaka Koizumi (Japan)

6 March 2024 Group stage	Uzbekistan	0–2	Australia	Tashkent, Uzbekistan
16:00 UTC+5		Report	Galic 5'; Trimis 38'	Stadium: JAR Stadium; Attendance: 80; Referee: Dong Fangyu (China)

9 March 2024 Group stage	Australia	3–0	Chinese Taipei	Tashkent, Uzbekistan
13:00 UTC+5	Nash 20'; Kruger 40'; Cicco 81'	Report		Stadium: Do'stlik Stadium

13 March 2024 Semi-final	Australia	1–5	Japan	Tashkent, Uzbekistan
16:00 UTC+5	Trimis 13'	Report	Yoneda 3'; Shiragaki 63'; Hijikata 83'; Sasai 88'; Thomas-Chinnama 89' (o.g.)	Stadium: JAR Stadium; Referee: Dong Fangyu (China)

16 March 2024 Third place match	Australia	1–0	South Korea	Tashkent, Uzbekistan
13:00 UTC+5	Gooch 78'	Report		Stadium: JAR Stadium; Referee: Asaka Koizumi (Japan)

=== Women's under-17 ===
==== AFC U-17 Women's Asian Cup ====
In qualification, Australia won all three of their matches to qualify for the Women's Asian Cup. In the Group stage, they lost all three matches. failing to make it to the knockout rounds.

20 September 2023 Qualification round 2	Australia	6–2	Philippines	Hanoi, Vietnam
16:00 ICT	Kuilamu 30'; Cuthbert 42'; McMahon 46'; Skelly 55'; Younis 75'; Duong 86' (pen.)	Report	Mathelus 14' (pen.), 17'	Stadium: Vietnam Youth Football Training Center; Referee: Mahsa Ghorbani (Iran)

22 September 2023 Qualification round 2	Vietnam	1–2	Australia	Hanoi, Vietnam
19:00 ICT	Ngân Thị Thanh Hiếu 28'	Report	Dale 41', 45'	Stadium: Vietnam Youth Football Training Center

24 September 2023 Qualification round 2	Australia	4–0	Bangladesh	Hanoi, Vietnam
16:00 ICT	Dale 2', 57', 61', 74'	Report		Stadium: Vietnam Youth Football Training Center

7 May 2024 Group stage	China	3–0	Australia	Bali, Indonesia
16:00 WITA	Zhou Xinyi 5'; Xiao Jiaqi 63'; Zhang Kecan 77'	Report		Stadium: Bali United Training Center; Referee: Veronika Bernatskaia (Kyrgyzstan)

10 May 2024 Group stage	Australia	1–4	Japan	Bali, Indonesia
19:00 WITA	Dos Santos 90+6' (pen.)	Report	Sato 3', 10'; Shinjo 65'; Hirakawa 80'	Stadium: Kapten I Wayan Dipta Stadium; Referee: Yang Shu-ting (Chinese Taipei)

13 May 2024 Group stage	Australia	1–3	Thailand	Bali, Indonesia
16:00 WITA	Punch 31'	Report	Kurisara 38'; Rinyaphat 67'; Chutikan 90+7'	Stadium: Bali United Training Center; Referee: Bùi Thị Thu Trang (Vietnam)

== AFC competitions ==
=== AFC Champions League ===
==== Group H ====
Pos	Team	Pld	W	D	L	GF	GA	GD	Pts	Qualification	VEN	MCY	ZHP	BUR
1	(Japan) Ventforet Kofu	6	3	2	1	11	8	+3	11	Advance to round of 16	—	3–3	4–1	1–0
2	(Australia) Melbourne City	6	2	3	1	8	6	+2	9		0–0	—	1–1	0–1
3	(China) Zhejiang	6	2	1	3	9	13	−4	7		2–0	1–2	—	3–2
4	(Thailand) Buriram United	6	2	0	4	9	10	−1	6		2–3	0–2	4–1	—

Source: AFC

=== AFC Cup ===
Central Coast Mariners won the competition for the first time. Mariners' striker Marco Túlio was the leading goalscorer for the competition, with eight goals. Central Coast Mariners' victory meant that Australia became the first nation to have had clubs winning both the AFC Champions League and AFC Cup, following Western Sydney Wanderers' victory in the 2014 AFC Champions League.

==== Group F ====
Pos	Team	Pld	W	D	L	GF	GA	GD	Pts	Qualification	MAC	CRO	DHC	SHN
1	(Australia) Macarthur FC	6	5	0	1	23	5	+18	15	Zonal semi-finals	—	5–0	8–2	4–0
2	(Cambodia) Phnom Penh Crown	6	4	0	2	15	7	+8	12	Zonal semi-finals	3–0	—	4–0	4–0
3	(Philippines) DH Cebu	6	1	1	4	4	19	−15	4 (Note: Ranked on head-to-head points: DH Cebu 4, Shan United 1.)		0–3	0–3	—	1–0
4	(Myanmar) Shan United	6	1	1	4	3	14	−11	4		0–3	2–1	1–1	—

Source: AFC

==== Group G ====
Pos	Team	Pld	W	D	L	GF	GA	GD	Pts	Qualification	CCM	TFC	BUF	STA
1	(Australia) Central Coast Mariners	6	4	1	1	21	7	+14	13	Zonal semi-finals	—	1–1	6–3	9–1
2	(Malaysia) Terengganu	6	3	3	0	10	6	+4	12		1–0	—	2–0	2–2
3	(Indonesia) Bali United	6	2	1	3	15	15	0	7		1–2	1–1	—	5–2
4	(Philippines) Stallion Laguna	6	0	1	5	9	27	−18	1		0–3	2–3	2–5	—

Source: AFC

==== Knockout stage ====
Zonal semi-finals
(Australia) Macarthur FC	3
(Malaysia) Sabah	0
ASEAN Zone
(Australia) Central Coast Mariners	4
(Cambodia) Phnom Penh Crown	0
(Bahrain) Al-Riffa	1	1	2
(Oman) Al-Nahda	1	3	4
West Asia Zone
(Lebanon) Al Ahed (p)	0	1	1 (4)
(Iraq) Al-Kahrabaa	1	0	1 (2)

Zonal finals
(Australia) Macarthur FC	2
(Australia) Central Coast Mariners (a.e.t.)	3
(Oman) Al-Nahda	0	2	2
(Lebanon) Al Ahed	1	2	3

Inter-zone play-off semi-finals
(Australia) Central Coast Mariners	4	0	4
(India) Odisha	0	0	0
(Kyrgyzstan) Abdysh-Ata Kant	5	3	8
(Chinese Taipei) Taichung Futuro	0	1	1

Inter-zone play-off finals
(Australia) Central Coast Mariners	1	3	4
(Kyrgyzstan) Abdysh-Ata Kant	1	0	1

Final
5 May – Muscat
(Australia) Central Coast Mariners	1
(Lebanon) Al Ahed	0

13 February 2024 Zonal semi-finals	Macarthur FC (Australia)	3–0	(Malaysia) Sabah	Sydney
15:00 UTC+11	Dávila 40'; Drew 46', 80'	Report		Stadium: Campbelltown Sports Stadium; Referee: Nasrullo Kabirov (Tajikistan)

13 February 2024 Zonal semi-finals	Central Coast Mariners (Australia)	4–0	(Cambodia) Phnom Penh Crown	Gosford
17:00 UTC+11	Reec 37'; Edmondson 72', 78', 90+4'	Report		Stadium: Central Coast Stadium; Referee: Pranjal Banerjee (India)

22 February 2024 Zonal final	Macarthur FC (Australia)	2–3 (a.e.t.)	(Australia) Central Coast Mariners	Sydney
19:00 AEDT	Dávila 88'; Rose 92'	Report	Torres 81'; Doka 105+3'; Barcellos 120'	Stadium: Campbelltown Sports Stadium

7 March 2024 Inter-zone semi-finals	Central Coast Mariners (Australia)	4–0	(India) Odisha	Gosford
19:00 AEDT	Doka 36', 77' (pen.); Roux 52'; Barcellos 89'	Report		Stadium: Central Coast Stadium; Referee: Qasim Al-Hatmi (Oman)

14 March 2024 Inter-zone semi-finals	Odisha (India)	0–0 (0–4 agg.)	(Australia) Central Coast Mariners	Bhubaneswar, India
15:00 IST		Report		Stadium: Kalinga Stadium

17 April 2024 Inter-zone final	Abdysh-Ata Kant (Kyrgyzstan)	1–1	(Australia) Central Coast Mariners	Bishkek, Kyrgyzstan
18:00 KGT	Uzdenov 90+3'	Report	Kaltak 81'	Stadium: Dolen Omurzakov Stadium; Attendance: 10,663; Referee: Gamini Nivon Robesh (Sri Lanka)

24 April 2024 Inter-zone final	Central Coast Mariners (Australia)	3–0 (4–1 agg.)	(Kyrgyzstan) Abdysh-Ata Kant	Gosford
19:00 AEST	Di Pizio 77', 90+1'; Doka 86'	Report		Stadium: Central Coast Stadium; Attendance: 4,723; Referee: Kim Hee-gon (South Korea)

5 May 2024 Final	Al Ahed (Lebanon)	0–1	(Australia) Central Coast Mariners	Muscat, Oman
20:00 UTC+4		Report	Kuol 84'	Stadium: Sultan Qaboos Sports Complex; Referee: Omar Al-Ali (United Arab Emirates)

=== AFC Women's Club Championship ===
==== Group B ====
Pos	Team	Pld	W	D	L	GF	GA	GD	Pts	Qualification
1	(South Korea) Hyundai Steel Red Angels	3	3	0	0	7	1	+6	9	Advance to final
2	(Australia) Sydney FC	3	2	0	1	5	4	+1	6	
3	(Uzbekistan) FC Nasaf (H)	3	0	1	2	3	6	−3	1	
4	(Iran) Bam Khatoon FC	3	0	1	2	3	7	−4	1	

Source: AFC
(H) Hosts

== Domestic leagues ==
=== A-League Men ===
Pos	Team	Pld	W	D	L	GF	GA	GD	Pts	Qualification
1	Central Coast Mariners (C)	27	17	4	6	49	27	+22	55	Qualification for AFC Champions League Elite and Finals series
2	Wellington Phoenix (Note: Wellington Phoenix cannot qualify for Asian Football Confederation competitions as they are based in New Zealand, which is part of the Oceania Football Confederation.)	27	15	8	4	42	26	+16	53	Qualification for Finals series (Note: The top two teams enter the finals series at the semi-finals, while the teams ranked third to sixth enter the finals series at the elimination-finals.)
3	Melbourne Victory	27	10	12	5	43	33	+10	42	Qualification for Finals series
4	Sydney FC	27	12	5	10	52	41	+11	41	Qualification for AFC Champions League Two and Finals series (Note: Qualified for AFC Champions League Two as the 2023 Australia Cup winners.)
5	Macarthur FC	27	11	8	8	45	48	−3	41	Qualification for Finals series
6	Melbourne City	27	11	6	10	50	38	+12	39	Qualification for Finals series
7	Western Sydney Wanderers	27	11	4	12	44	48	−4	37	
8	Adelaide United	27	9	5	13	52	53	−1	32	
9	Brisbane Roar	27	8	6	13	42	55	−13	30	Qualification for 2024 Australia Cup play-offs
10	Newcastle Jets	27	6	10	11	39	47	−8	28	Qualification for 2024 Australia Cup play-offs
11	Western United	27	7	5	15	36	55	−19	26	Qualification for 2024 Australia Cup play-offs
12	Perth Glory	27	5	7	15	46	69	−23	22	Qualification for 2024 Australia Cup play-offs

Source: A-Leagues
Rules for classification: 1) points; 2) wins; 3) goal difference; 4) goals scored; 5) head-to-head results; 5a) head-to-head points; 5b) head-to-head goal difference; 6) Fair Play points; 7) away goal difference; 8) away goals per match; 9) home goal difference; 10) home goals per match; 11) toss of a coin in an event of a tie of two clubs.
(C) Champions

==== Finals series ====
Elimination-finals
4	Sydney FC	4
5	Macarthur FC	0
3	Melbourne Victory (p)	1 (3)
6	Melbourne City	1 (2)

Semi-finals
4	Sydney FC	1	0	1
1	Central Coast Mariners	2	0	2
3	Melbourne Victory (a.e.t.)	0	2	2
2	Wellington Phoenix	0	1	1

Grand final
1	Central Coast Mariners (a.e.t.)	3
3	Melbourne Victory	1

=== A-League Women ===
Pos	Team	Pld	W	D	L	GF	GA	GD	Pts	Qualification
1	Melbourne City	22	12	5	5	40	29	+11	41	Qualification to Finals series and 2024–25 AFC Women's Champions League
2	Sydney FC (C)	22	11	6	5	31	20	+11	39	Qualification to Finals series
3	Western United	22	11	3	8	37	34	+3	36	Qualification to Finals series
4	Melbourne Victory	22	10	6	6	44	29	+15	36	Qualification to Finals series
5	Central Coast Mariners	22	10	5	7	31	24	+7	35	Qualification to Finals series
6	Newcastle Jets	22	10	3	9	43	36	+7	33	Qualification to Finals series
7	Western Sydney Wanderers	22	10	3	9	30	30	0	33	
8	Wellington Phoenix (Note: Wellington Phoenix cannot qualify for Asian Football Confederation competitions as they are based in New Zealand, which is under the Oceania Football Confederation.)	22	9	1	12	36	33	+3	28	
9	Brisbane Roar	22	7	5	10	28	35	−7	26	
10	Perth Glory	22	6	6	10	25	32	−7	24	
11	Canberra United	22	6	6	10	39	47	−8	24	
12	Adelaide United	22	4	3	15	21	56	−35	15	

Source: A-Leagues
Rules for classification: 1) points; 2) wins; 3) goal difference; 4) goals scored; 5) head-to-head results; 6) Fair Play points; 7) away head-to-head results; 8) home head-to-head results; 9) toss of a coin
(C) Champions

==== Finals series ====
Elimination-finals
4	Melbourne Victory	0 (2)
5	Central Coast Mariners (p)	0 (4)
3	Western United	2
6	Newcastle Jets (a.e.t.)	4

Semi-finals
1	Melbourne City	3	3	6
6	Newcastle Jets	0	0	0
2	Sydney FC	1	1	2
5	Central Coast Mariners	0	1	1

Grand final
1	Melbourne City	0
2	Sydney FC	1

== Domestic cups ==
=== Australia Cup ===
Round of 32
North Eastern MetroStars	5
Inglewood United	0
Hellenic Athletic	0
Inter Lions	6
Oakleigh Cannons	2
Melbourne City	3
Peninsula Power	1
Wellington Phoenix (a.e.t.)	2
Goulburn Valley Suns	1
APIA Leichhardt	4
Sydney FC (p)	3 (10)
Central Coast Mariners	3 (9)
Gold Coast Knights	1
Devonport City Strikers	0
Edgeworth FC	0
Western United	4
Melbourne Knights	4
Lions FC	1
Campbelltown City	2
Macarthur FC	1
Mt Druitt Town Rangers	3
Canberra Croatia	1
Moreton Bay United	0
Heidelberg United	3
Broadmeadow Magic	2
Sydney United 58	4
Newcastle Jets	2
Brisbane Roar (a.e.t.)	3
Floreat Athena	1
Western Sydney Wanderers	6
Northcote City	0
Adelaide United	2

Round of 16
North Eastern MetroStars	1
Inter Lions	0
Melbourne City	3
Wellington Phoenix	0
APIA Leichhardt	0
Sydney FC	2
Gold Coast Knights	0
Western United	2
Melbourne Knights	2
Campbelltown City	0
Mt Druitt Town Rangers	0
Heidelberg United	3
Sydney United 58	0
Brisbane Roar	5
Western Sydney Wanderers	5
Adelaide United	1

Quarter-finals
North Eastern MetroStars	1
Melbourne City	2
Sydney FC	3
Western United	0
Melbourne Knights	3
Heidelberg United	2
Brisbane Roar	4
Western Sydney Wanderers	2

Semi-finals
Melbourne City	1
Sydney FC	2
Melbourne Knights	0
Brisbane Roar	1

Final
Sydney FC	3
Brisbane Roar	1

==== Final ====
7 October 2023
19:45 AEDT

Sydney FC (1)	3–1	Brisbane Roar (1)
Fábio 67' (pen.), 90+1'; Mak 72'	Report	Waddingham 18'

Allianz Stadium, Sydney
Attendance: 15,482
Referee: Ben Abraham

== Deaths ==
- 6 July 2023: Attila Abonyi, 76, Australia, Melbourne Hungaria, St George-Budapest, Sydney Croatia, and Melita Eagles winger.
- 21 October 2023: Bobby Charlton, 86, England, Newcastle KB United and Blacktown City midfielder.
- 25 November 2023: Terry Venables, 80, coach of Australia.
- 15 January 2024: Stephen Laybutt, 46, Australia, Wollongong Wolves, Brisbane Strikers, Parramatta Power, Sydney Olympic, and Newcastle Jets defender.
- 11 March 2024: Steve Maxwell, 59, Australia, Adelaide City, and Marconi Stallions forward.
- 8 April 2024: Ron Lord, 94, Australia and Sydney Prague goalkeeper.
- 27 June 2024: Alan Westwater, 78, Australia, Canterbury Marrickville, and Pan Hellenic midfielder.

== Retirements ==
- 11 July 2023: Georgina Worth, 26, former Brisbane Roar and Newcastle Jets goalkeeper.
- 24 July 2023: Emily Garnier, 27, former Newcastle Jets defender.
- 21 September 2023: Natasha Dowie, 35, former England and Melbourne Victory forward.
- 21 September 2023: Éric Bauthéac, 36, former Brisbane Roar midfielder.
- 3 October 2023: Tom Rogic, 30, former Australia, Belconnen United, Central Coast Mariners, and Melbourne Victory midfielder.
- 30 October 2023: Craig Noone, 35, former Melbourne City and Macarthur midfielder.
- 3 December 2023: Shinji Ono, 44, former Japan and Western Sydney Wanderers midfielder.
- 24 March 2024: Adriana Konjarski, 28, former Newcastle Jets, Adelaide United, Melbourne City, South Melbourne, Warners Bay, and Broadmeadow Magic forward.
- 29 March 2024: Larissa Crummer, 28, former Australia, Sydney FC, Brisbane Roar, Melbourne City, and Newcastle Jets defender and forward.
- 14 April 2024: Emma Checker, 28, former Australia, Adelaide United, Melbourne Victory, Canberra United, and Melbourne City defender.
- 27 April 2024: Jason Hoffman, 35, former Hamilton Olympic, Newcastle Jets, Richmond SC, and Melbourne City defender.
- 27 April 2024: Miloš Ninković, 39, former Serbia, Sydney FC, and Western Sydney Wanderers midfielder.
- 3 May 2024: Natasha Rigby, 31, former Perth Glory defender.
- 7 May 2024: Gema Simon, 33, former Australia, Melbourne Victory, and Newcastle Jets defender.
- 22 May 2024: Tando Velaphi, 37, former Perth SC, Queensland Roar, Perth Glory, Melbourne Victory, Melbourne City, and Wellington Phoenix goalkeeper.
- 25 May 2024: Leigh Broxham, 36, former Australia and Melbourne Victory defender.
- 26 May 2024: Danny Vukovic, 39, former Australia, Parramatta Power, Central Coast Mariners, Wellington Phoenix, Perth Glory, Melbourne Victory, and Sydney FC goalkeeper.
- 28 May 2024: Jake McGing, 30, former Marconi Stallions, Central Coast Mariners, Brisbane Roar, and Macarthur FC defender.
- 28 May 2024: Alexandra Huynh, 29, former Australia, Macarthur Rams, and Newcastle Jets defender.
