= Wulf Horota =

Indonesian footballer

Personal information
- Full name: Wulf Koronia Kluivert Shevcengko Horota
- Date of birth: 13 January 2001 (age 25)
- Place of birth: Jayapura, Indonesia
- Height: 1.78 m (5 ft 10 in)
- Position: Left-back

Team information
- Current team: Persipura Jayapura
- Number: 26

Youth career
- 2019–2020: Persipura Jayapura

Senior career*
Years	Team	Apps	(Gls)
2020–2022	Persipura Jayapura	16	(0)
2023	PSS Sleman	0	(0)
2023–	Persipura Jayapura	3	(0)
- * Club domestic league appearances and goals as of 28 September 2023

Wulf Koronia Kluivert Shevcengko Horota (born 13 January 2001) is an Indonesian professional footballer who plays as a left-back for Liga 2 club Persipura Jayapura.

== Club career ==
=== Persipura Jayapura ===
He was signed for Persipura Jayapura to play in Liga 1 in the 2021 season. Horota made his first-team debut on 30 October 2021 in a match against Persib Bandung at the Manahan Stadium, Surakarta.
