= Josh Holong =

Indonesian footballer

Personal information
- Full name: Josh Holong Junior
- Date of birth: 1 April 2008 (age 18)
- Place of birth: Jakarta, Indonesia
- Height: 1.74 m (5 ft 9 in)
- Position: Forward

Team information
- Current team: Persija Jakarta (youth)
- Number: 50

Youth career
- 2022–2024: Adhyaksa Farmel
- 2024–: Persija Jakarta

International career^{‡}
Years	Team	Apps	(Gls)
2024–2025	Indonesia U17	8	(3)
Medal record
Men's football
Representing Indonesia
ASEAN U-16 Boys Championship
Bronze medal – third place	2024 Indonesia
- ‡ National team caps and goals as of 14 April 2025

Josh "Nio" Holong Junior (born 1 April 2008) is an Indonesian footballer who plays as a forward for Liga 1 club Persija Jakarta youth.

== Club career ==
Holong currently trains at the Farmel Isvil Football Academy managed by Adhyaksa Farmel team based in Tangerang, Banten.

== International career ==
Holong was called up by coach Nova Arianto to the Indonesia U16 team to participate at the 2024 ASEAN U-16 Boys Championship tournament in Surakarta. In the tournament, Holong scored 3 goals.

== Career statistics ==
=== International goals ===
International under-17 goals

As of 3 July 2024

No.	Date	Venue	Opponent	Score	Result	Competition
1.	27 June 2024	Manahan Stadium, Indonesia	Laos	3–1	6–1	2024 ASEAN U-16 Boys Championship
2.	27 June 2024	Manahan Stadium, Indonesia	Laos	5–1	6–1	2024 ASEAN U-16 Boys Championship
3.	1 July 2024	Manahan Stadium, Indonesia	Australia	3–5	3–5	2024 ASEAN U-16 Boys Championship

== Honours ==
Indonesia U16

- ASEAN U-16 Championship third place: 2024
