= Zahaby Gholy =

Indonesian footballer

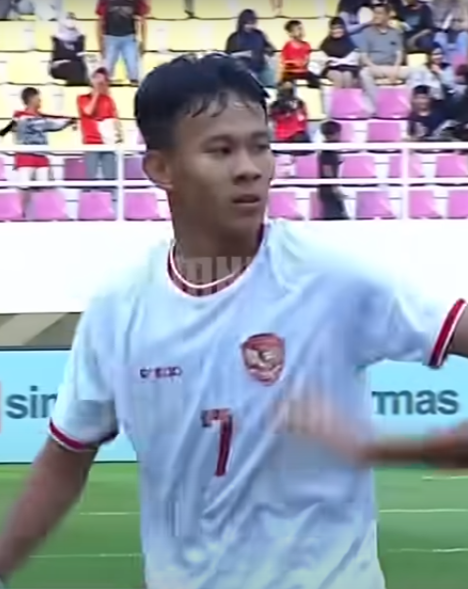
- Gholy in 2024

Personal information
- Full name: Muhamad Zahaby Gholy
- Date of birth: 5 December 2008 (age 17)
- Place of birth: Bekasi, Indonesia
- Height: 1.70 m (5 ft 7 in)
- Position: Winger

Team information
- Current team: Adhyaksa Bekasi (on loan from Persija Jakarta)
- Number: 7

Youth career
- SSB Garuda Putra
- SSB RND Jakarta
- Persipasi Bekasi
- 2023–2024: Persija Jakarta Elite Pro Academy

Senior career*
Years	Team	Apps	(Gls)
2024–	Persija Jakarta	2	(0)
2026–	→ Adhyaksa Bekasi (loan)	8	(1)

International career^{‡}
2024–2025	Indonesia U17	23	(10)
2026–	Indonesia U20	3	(2)
- * Club domestic league appearances and goals as of 9 November 2026 ‡ National team caps and goals as of 6 September 2026

Muhamad Zahaby Gholy (born 5 December 2008) is an Indonesian professional footballer who plays as a winger for Championship club Adhyaksa Bekasi, on loan from Persija Jakarta.

== Early life ==
Muhamad Zahaby Gholy was born on 5 December 2008 in Bekasi, Indonesia, to Muhammad, a football coach, and Aminah. Gholy is a Muslim. In 2023, Gholy joined Persija Jakarta youth team.

== Club career ==
=== Persija Jakarta ===
On 21 July 2024, Gholy made his first team debut, coming on in the 69th minute in the Piala Presiden pre-season tournament. On 17 May 2025, Gholy made his competitive debut, coming on as a 90+2 minute substitute for Ryo Matsumura, in a 2–1 defeat against PSS Sleman.

== International career ==
In 2024, Gholy scored 5 goals in the ASEAN U-16 Championship, helping Indonesia finish 3rd, and winning the Most Valuable Player award.

In the 2025 AFC U-17 Asian Cup, Gholy scored two goals, each against Yemen and Afghanistan, helping Indonesia advance to the knockout stage and qualify for the 2025 FIFA U-17 World Cup.

== Style of play ==
A versatile player, Gholy is capable of operating on both flanks as a winger and has also been used in central attacking roles due to his ability to use both of his feet. His style of play is noted for pace, agility, and close control, which allow him to take on defenders in one-on-one situations. In addition to his dribbling ability, he has demonstrated composure in front of goal and has been recognized for scoring in decisive moments at youth international tournaments. Gholy is also regarded for his long-range shooting, with one of his goals at the 2025 AFC U-17 Asian Cup being highlighted as among the best of the competition.

== Career statistics ==
=== Club ===
As of match played 18 September 2026

Appearances and goals by club, season and competition
Club	Season	League			Cup		Continental		Other		Total	
Club	Season	Division	Apps	Goals	Apps	Goals	Apps	Goals	Apps	Goals	Apps	Goals
Persija Jakarta	2024–25	Liga 1	2	0	–		–		2 (Note: Appearances in Piala Presiden)	0	4	0
Persija Jakarta	2025–26	Super League	0	0	–		–		0	0	0	0
Adhyaksa Bekasi (loan)	2026–27	Championship	2	0	–		–		0	0	2	0
Career Total			4	0	0	0	0	0	2	0	6	0

== Honours ==
Indonesia U16

- ASEAN U-16 Boys Championship third-place: 2024

Individual

- ASEAN U-16 Boys Championship Most Valuable Player: 2024
- AFC U-17 Asian Cup Best Goal: 2025
