= 2024 ASEAN U-16 Boys Championship =

Kejuaraan Remaja U-16 ASEAN 2024

Tournament details
- Host country: Indonesia
- City: Surakarta
- Dates: 21 June – 3 July
- Teams: 12 (from 1 sub-confederation)
- Venues: 2 (in 1 host city)

Final positions
- Champions: Australia (3rd title)
- Runners-up: Thailand
- Third place: Indonesia
- Fourth place: Vietnam

Tournament statistics
- Matches played: 22
- Goals scored: 111 (5.05 per match)
- Top scorer(s): (Australia) Anthony Didulica (Australia) Quinn MacNicol (6 goals each)
- Best player: (Indonesia) Zahaby Gholy
- Best goalkeeper: (Thailand) Supakorn Poonpol

The 2024 ASEAN U-16 Boys Championship was the 19th edition of the ASEAN U-16 Boys Championship, organised by ASEAN Football Federation. It was hosted by Indonesia from 21 June to 3 July 2024. This was also the first edition that the tournament was rebranded to ASEAN Championship. Players born on or after 1 January 2008 could participate in this tournament.

== Participant teams ==
There was no qualification, and all entrants advanced to the final tournament. The following 12 teams from member associations of the ASEAN Football Federation entered the tournament.

Team	Association	App	Previous best performance
Australia	Football Australia	9th	Winners (2008, 2016)
Brunei	FA Brunei DS	10th	Group stage (9 times)
Cambodia	FF Cambodia	12th	Fourth place (2016)
Indonesia (H)	FA Indonesia	12th	Winners (2018, 2022)
Laos	Lao FF	14th	Runners-up (2002, 2007, 2011)
Malaysia	FA Malaysia	13th	Winners (2013, 2019)
Myanmar	Myanmar FF	13th	Winners (2002, 2005)
Philippines	Philippine FF	10th	Group stage (9 times)
Singapore	FA Singapore	12th	Fourth place (2008, 2011)
Thailand	FA Thailand	12th	Winners (2007, 2011, 2015)
Timor-Leste	FF Timor-Leste	9th	Third place (2010)
Vietnam	Vietnam FF	14th	Winners (2006, 2010, 2017)

== Draw ==
The tournament's official draw was held on 30 May 2024 in Jakarta, Indonesia at 14:00 (GMT+07:00). The pot placements followed each teams progress based on the previous edition.

Pot 1	Pot 2	Pot 3	Pot 4
Indonesia (H); Vietnam; Thailand	Myanmar; Laos; Malaysia	Timor-Leste; Cambodia; Philippines	Australia; Singapore; Brunei

- (H): Tournament host

== Officials ==
The following officials were chosen for the competition. Video assistant referees (VAR) would be used from the semi-finals onwards. This was the first AFF tournament which uses the video assistant referee.

Referees

- (Cambodia) Khin Ouseyha
- (China) Du Jianxin
- (Hong Kong) Poon Chun Kit
- (Indonesia) Ryan Nanda Saputra
- (Japan) Koji Takasaki
- (Malaysia) Zakaria Ismail
- (Singapore) Muhammad Zulfiqar
- (Singapore) Clarence Leow Hong Wei
- (Thailand) Warintorn Sassadee
- (Vietnam) Lê Vũ Linh
- (Vietnam) Nguyễn Mạnh Hải

Assistant Referees

- (Brunei) Faisal Ali
- (Indonesia) Nurhadi Sulchan
- (Indonesia) Azizul Alimmudin Hanafiah
- (Indonesia) Akbar Jamaluddin
- (Japan) Tomoyuki Umeda
- (Saudi Arabia) Faisal Nasser Alqahtani
- (Malaysia) Farhan Abdul Aziz
- (Myanmar) Zayar Maung
- (Thailand) Nophuan Apichit
- (Vietnam) Nguyễn Lâm Minh Đăng

Video Assistant Referees

- (Japan) Hiroyuki Kimura
- (Japan) Jumpei Iida
- (South Korea) Kim Woo-sung
- (South Korea) Lee Seul-gi

== Venues ==
In May 2024, the ASEAN Football Federation officially announced the 2 venues for the tournament which was located in Surakarta, Central Java.

Surakarta
Manahan Stadium	Sriwedari Stadium
Capacity: 20,000	Capacity: 10,000
2024 ASEAN U-16 Boys Championship is located in Java

== Squads ==
Players born on or after 1 January 2008 are eligible to compete in the tournament. Each team can register a maximum of 23 players (minimum three of whom must be goalkeepers).

== Group stage ==
- All times listed are WIB (UTC+7).

=== Group A ===
Pos	Team	Pld	W	D	L	GF	GA	GD	Pts	Qualification
1	Indonesia (H)	3	3	0	0	12	1	+11	9	Knockout stage
2	Laos	3	2	0	1	6	7	−1	6	
3	Singapore	3	1	0	2	5	5	0	3	
4	Philippines	3	0	0	3	0	10	−10	0	

Rules for classification: Group stage tiebreakers
(H) Hosts
21 June 2024
15:00

Laos	3–0	Philippines
Daophahad 39'; Fabela 49' (o.g.); Vongdeuan 90+10'	Report

Manahan Stadium, Surakarta
Referee: Poon Chun Kit (Hong Kong)
21 June 2024
19:30

Indonesia	3–0	Singapore
Mierza 40'; Evandra 59' (pen.); Alberto 87'	Report

Manahan Stadium, Surakarta
Referee: Koji Takasaki (Japan)

24 June 2024
15:00

Singapore	1–2	Laos
Andy 11' (pen.)	Report	Phayak 19' (pen.); Bounpaseut 56'

Manahan Stadium, Surakarta
Referee: Khin Ouseyha (Cambodia)
24 June 2024
19:30

Philippines	0–3	Indonesia
	Report	Evandra 65'; Mierza 71', 90+2'

Manahan Stadium, Surakarta
Referee: Du Jianxin (China)

27 June 2024
19:30

Indonesia	6–1	Laos
Gholy 24' (pen.); Sayyavath 30' (o.g.); Holong 37', 61'; Panji 45+3'; Mierza 79'	Report	Phayak 7' (pen.)

Manahan Stadium, Surakarta
Referee: Poon Chun Kit (Hong Kong)
27 June 2024
19:30

Philippines	0–4	Singapore
	Report	Harith 16'; Helmi 66'; Rae Peh 82', 85'

Sriwedari Stadium, Surakarta
Referee: Warintorn Sassadee (Thailand)

=== Group B ===
Pos	Team	Pld	W	D	L	GF	GA	GD	Pts	Qualification
1	Vietnam	3	2	1	0	21	2	+19	7	Knockout stage
2	Cambodia	3	2	1	0	9	2	+7	7	
3	Myanmar	3	1	0	2	10	8	+2	3	
4	Brunei	3	0	0	3	1	29	−28	0	

Rules for classification: Group stage tiebreakers
22 June 2024
15:00

Vietnam	15–0	Brunei
Nguyễn Việt Long 17', 22', 40'; Đậu Hồng Phong 33', 49'; Nguyễn Thái Hiếu 37', 84' (pen.); Trần Gia Bảo 43' (pen.); Nguyễn Văn Bách 52'; Nguyễn Thiên Phú 58'; Trần Thanh Bình 66', 87', 88'; Nguyễn Hồng Quang 68'; Chu Ngọc Nguyễn Lực 90+5'	Report

Sriwedari Stadium, Surakarta
Referee: Warintorn Sassadee (Thailand)
22 June 2024
19:30

Myanmar	1–2	Cambodia
Nyi Nyi Thant 25'	Report	Daro 75', 90+3'

Sriwedari Stadium, Surakarta
Referee: Ryan Nanda Saputra (Indonesia)

25 June 2024
15:00

Brunei	1–8	Myanmar
Faris 90+7' (pen.)	Report	Kyaw Thiha 7', 27'; Thura Min Thant 8', 23'; Nyan Aung 9'; Kyaw Nyi Nyi 18'; Myo Nanda Aung 34', 56'

Sriwedari Stadium, Surakarta
Referee: Ryan Nanda Saputra (Indonesia)
25 June 2024
19:30

Cambodia	1–1	Vietnam
Vreak 62'	Report	Nguyễn Việt Long 57'

Sriwedari Stadium, Surakarta
Referee: Kamil Zakaria (Malaysia)

28 June 2024
15:00

Vietnam	5–1	Myanmar
Nguyễn Thái Hòa 18', 26'; Bùi Duy Đăng 66'; Nguyễn Thái Hiếu 71'; Nguyễn Việt Long 81'	Report	Nyi Nyi Thant 40'

Manahan Stadium, Surakarta
Referee: Koji Takasaki (Japan)
28 June 2024
15:00

Cambodia	6–0	Brunei
Ovanda 4' (pen.); Adrian M. 12' (o.g.); Mohamatsorles 16'; Daro 58'; Gitong 66'; Visal 83'	Report

Sriwedari Stadium, Surakarta
Referee: Kamil Zakaria (Malaysia)

=== Group C ===
Pos	Team	Pld	W	D	L	GF	GA	GD	Pts	Qualification
1	Australia	3	2	1	0	14	0	+14	7	Knockout stage
2	Thailand	3	2	1	0	9	1	+8	7	Knockout stage
3	Malaysia	3	1	0	2	6	5	+1	3	
4	Timor-Leste	3	0	0	3	0	23	−23	0	

Rules for classification: Group stage tiebreakers
23 June 2024
15:00

Thailand	0–0	Australia
	Report

Sriwedari Stadium, Surakarta
Referee: Muhammad Zulfiqar (Singapore)
23 June 2024
19:30

Malaysia	5–0	Timor-Leste
Izzuddin 35'; Fahmi 55'; Awal 66', 89'; Arayyan 78'	Report

Sriwedari Stadium, Surakarta
Referee: Lê Vũ Linh (Vietnam)

26 June 2024
15:00

Australia	2–0	Malaysia
Tatu 45+5'; Williams 90+5'	Report

Sriwedari Stadium, Surakarta
Referee: Clarence Leow Hong Wei (Singapore)
26 June 2024
19:30

Timor-Leste	0–6	Thailand
	Report	Jompon 21', 28', 38', 90+3'; Natthakit 25'; Phanuphong 82'

Sriwedari Stadium, Surakarta
Referee: Nguyễn Mạnh Hải (Vietnam)

29 June 2024
15:00

Thailand	3–1	Malaysia
Jompon 74' (pen.); Siwakorn 76'; Poramet 89' (pen.)	Report	Izzudin 4'

Manahan Stadium, Surakarta
Referee: Du Jianxin (China)
29 June 2024
15:00

Timor-Leste	0–12	Australia
	Report	J. Houridis 6', 23'; Didulica 8', 57', 78', 80'; Alfaro 47'; MacNicol 51', 58' (pen.), 63', 89'; Graoroski 54'

Sriwedari Stadium, Surakarta
Referee: Muhammad Zulfiqar (Singapore)

=== Ranking of runner-up teams ===
The best runner-up team from three groups advance to the Knockout stage.

Pos	Grp	Team	Pld	W	D	L	GF	GA	GD	Pts	Qualification
1	C	Thailand	3	2	1	0	9	1	+8	7	Knockout stage
2	B	Cambodia	3	2	1	0	9	2	+7	7	
3	A	Laos	3	2	0	1	6	7	−1	6	

Rules for classification: 1) Points; 2) Goal difference; 3) Goals scored; 13) Drawing of lots.

== Knockout stage ==
In the knockout stage, the penalty shoot-out is used to decide the winner if necessary

=== Bracket ===
Semi-finals
1 July – Surakarta
Vietnam	1
Thailand	2
1 July – Surakarta
Indonesia	3
Australia	5

Final
3 July – Surakarta
Thailand	1 (7)
Australia (p)	1 (8)
Third place match
3 July – Surakarta
Vietnam	0
Indonesia	5

=== Semi-finals ===
1 July 2024
15:00

Vietnam	1–2	Thailand
Đậu Hồng Phong 52' (pen.)	Report	Phuriphan 61'; Chaiwat 90+3'

Manahan Stadium, Surakarta
Referee: Du Jianxin (China)
1 July 2024
19:30

Indonesia	3–5	Australia
Gholy 3', 45+5'; Holong 90+3'	Report	Tatu 23', 66'; MacNicol 45+2'; Didulica 70', 86'

Manahan Stadium, Surakarta
Referee: Koji Takasaki (Japan)

=== Third place match ===
3 July 2024
15:00

Vietnam	0–5	Indonesia
	Report	Gholy 45', 78'; Zaidan 45+4'; Daniel 76', 82'

Manahan Stadium, Surakarta
Referee: Du Jianxin (China)

=== Final ===
3 July 2024
19:30

Thailand	1–1	Australia
Poramet 33'	Report	MacNicol 45+3'
Penalties
Poramet (penalty missed); Phuriphan (penalty scored); Phanuphong (penalty scored); Supakorn (penalty scored); Natthakit (penalty scored); Kittipob (penalty scored); Chaiwat (penalty scored); Siwakorn (penalty scored); Chatchawas (penalty missed)	7–8	(penalty scored) Alfaro; (penalty missed) MacNicol; (penalty scored) Maltz; (penalty scored) Didulica; (penalty scored) Eames; (penalty scored) Pullella; (penalty scored) Garbowski; (penalty scored) Kutleshi; (penalty scored) Necovski

Manahan Stadium, Surakarta
Referee: Koji Takasaki (Japan)

== Winner ==
2024 ASEAN U-16 Boys Championship winners

Australia
Third title

== Awards ==
Most Valuable Player	Top Scorer Award	Best Goalkeeper Award
(Indonesia) Zahaby Gholy	(Australia) Anthony Didulica (Australia) Quinn MacNicol	(Thailand) Supakorn Poonpol

== Goalscorers ==
There were 111 goals scored in 22 matches, for an average of 5.05 goals per match.

6 goals

- (Australia) Anthony Didulica
- (Australia) Quinn MacNicol

5 goals

- (Vietnam) Nguyễn Việt Long
- (Thailand) Jompon Homboonma
- (Indonesia) Zahaby Gholy

4 goals

- (Indonesia) Mierza Firjatullah

3 goals

- (Vietnam) Đậu Hồng Phong
- (Vietnam) Nguyễn Thái Hiếu
- (Vietnam) Trần Thanh Bình
- (Cambodia) Thach Daro
- (Indonesia) Josh Holong
- (Australia) Amlani Tatu

2 goals

- (Australia) James Houridis
- (Indonesia) Daniel Alfrido
- (Indonesia) Evandra Florasta
- (Laos) Phayak Siphanom
- (Malaysia) Awal Wafiy
- (Malaysia) Izzuddin Afif
- (Myanmar) Kyaw Thiha
- (Myanmar) Thura Min Thant
- (Myanmar) Myo Nanda Aung
- (Myanmar) Nyi Nyi Thant
- (Singapore) Rae Peh Jun Wen
- (Thailand) Poramet Laoongdi
- (Vietnam) Nguyễn Thái Hòa

1 goal

- (Australia) Nickolas Alfaro
- (Australia) Jordan Graoroski
- (Australia) Rhys Williams
- (Brunei) Faris Fadhillah
- (Cambodia) Doeun Gitong
- (Cambodia) Kea Visal
- (Cambodia) Noem Ovanda
- (Cambodia) Phan Vreak
- (Cambodia) Seth Mohamatsorles
- (Indonesia) Fadly Alberto
- (Indonesia) Dafa Zaidan
- (Indonesia) Putu Panji
- (Laos) Bounpaseut Sengsavang
- (Laos) Daophahad Kamkasomphou
- (Laos) Vongdeuan Soulibanh
- (Malaysia) Fahmi Farizamal
- (Malaysia) Arayyan Hakeem
- (Myanmar) Nyan Aung
- (Myanmar) Kyaw Nyi Nyi
- (Singapore) Andy Reefdy
- (Singapore) Harith Danish
- (Singapore) Helmi Shahrol
- (Thailand) Chaiwat Ngoenma
- (Thailand) Natthakit Phosri
- (Thailand) Phanuphong Wan-on
- (Thailand) Phuriphan Phothong
- (Thailand) Siwakorn Ponsan
- (Vietnam) Bùi Duy Đăng
- (Vietnam) Chu Ngọc Nguyễn Lực
- (Vietnam) Nguyễn Hồng Quang
- (Vietnam) Nguyễn Thiên Phú
- (Vietnam) Trần Gia Bảo
- (Vietnam) Nguyễn Văn Bách

1 own goal

- (Brunei) Adrian Marvel Erni (against Cambodia)
- (Laos) Sayyavath Vansavath (against Indonesia)
- (Philippines) Sambalod Fabela (against Laos)

== Final ranking ==
Pos	Team	Pld	W	D	L	GF	GA	GD	Pts	Final result
1	Australia	5	3	2	0	20	4	+16	11	Champion
2	Thailand	5	3	2	0	12	3	+9	11	Runner up
3	Indonesia (H)	5	4	0	1	20	6	+14	12	Third place
4	Vietnam	5	2	1	2	22	9	+13	7	Fourth place
5	Cambodia	3	2	1	0	9	2	+7	7	Eliminated in group stage
6	Laos	3	2	0	1	5	6	−1	6	Eliminated in group stage
7	Myanmar	3	1	0	2	10	8	+2	3	Eliminated in group stage
8	Malaysia	3	1	0	2	6	5	+1	3	Eliminated in group stage
9	Singapore	3	1	0	2	5	5	0	3	Eliminated in group stage
10	Philippines	3	0	0	3	0	10	−10	0	Eliminated in group stage
11	Timor-Leste	3	0	0	3	0	23	−23	0	Eliminated in group stage
12	Brunei	3	0	0	3	1	29	−28	0	Eliminated in group stage

Source: Group stage, Knockout stage
(H) Hosts

== Broadcasting rights ==
Broadcasters in Southeast Asia who acquired rights to the tournament include:

Territory	Broadcaster(s)	Ref.
Cambodia	Hang Meas HDTV	
Indonesia	Indosiar; Vidio.com	
Thailand	Changsuek TV (Facebook and YouTube); NBT2HD	

== See also ==
- 2024 ASEAN Championship
- 2024 ASEAN U-19 Boys Championship
