= Quinn MacNicol =

Australian soccer player (born 2008)

Personal information
- Full name: Quinn MacNicol
- Date of birth: 10 January 2008 (age 18)
- Place of birth: Brisbane, Australia
- Height: 1.81 m (5 ft 11 1/2 in)
- Position: Attacking midfielder

Team information
- Current team: Melbourne City
- Number: 19

Youth career
- 2020–: Brisbane Roar

Senior career*
| Years | Team | Apps | (Gls) |
| 2023–2026 | Brisbane Roar NPL | 6 | (1) |
| 2023–2026 | Brisbane Roar | 20 | (0) |
| 2026– | Melbourne City | 0 | (0) |

International career^{‡}
| 2024– | Australia U17 | 14 | (14) |
| 2025– | Australia U20 | 4 | (1) |
Medal record
Men's football
Representing Australia
ASEAN U-16 Boys Championship
| First place | 2024 Indonesia | U-17 Team |
- * Club domestic league appearances and goals as of 18 April 2026 ‡ National team caps and goals as of 31 March 2026

Quinn MacNicol (/ˈmæk.nɪ.kəl/; born 10 January 2008) is an Australian soccer player who plays as an attacking midfielder for Melbourne City.

== Club career ==
=== Brisbane Roar ===
MacNicol made his debut for Brisbane Roar in an Australia Cup clash against the Newcastle Jets on 14 August 2023. He replaced Carlo Armiento in the 100th minute as the Roar advanced to the next round with a 3–2 win in extra-time, becoming the Roar's youngest ever debutant at 15 years and 216 days old. On 26 August 2023, MacNicol became the youngest goalscorer in the cup at 15 years and 228 days, scoring the fifth goal in a 5–0 win over Sydney United 58 in the Round of 16.

Following his stint in the Australia Cup, MacNicol signed his first professional contract – a scholarship – in September 2023 with Brisbane.

== Youth international career ==
He was called up in May 2025 for the Australia men's national under-18 soccer team, to take part in the 2025 UEFA Friendship Cup commencing in early June.

== Personal life ==
Raised in South East Queensland, MacNicol was a youth player with Rochedale Rovers prior to signing for Brisbane Roar. He attends Anglican Church Grammar School in East Brisbane, Queensland.

His uncle is former Gippsland Falcons' forward, Brian MacNicol.

== Honours ==
Australia U17

- ASEAN U-16 Boys Championship: 2024

Individual

- ASEAN U-16 Boys Championship Golden Boot: 2024
