= Amlani Tatu =

Australian soccer player (born 2008)

Personal information
- Date of birth: 1 July 2008 (age 18)
- Place of birth: Adelaide, South Australia
- Height: 1.75 m (5 ft 9 in)
- Position: Winger

Team information
- Current team: Adelaide United
- Number: 19

Youth career
- 2018–2022: Croydon FC
- 2023–: Adelaide United

Senior career*
Years	Team	Apps	(Gls)
2023–	Adelaide United NPL	48	(17)
2025–	Adelaide United	8	(0)

International career^{‡}
2024–	Australia U17	12	(7)
- * Club domestic league appearances and goals as of 16 September 2026 ‡ National team caps and goals as of 14 April 2025

Amlani Tatu (Kirundi: [ɑmláni tɑtú]; born 1 July 2008) is an Australian soccer player who plays as a winger for A-League Men club Adelaide United.

== Club career ==
=== Adelaide United ===
After starting with the youth team, Tatu signed his first professional contract with Adelaide United in August 2024. He made his competitive debut at home against Newcastle Jets on 15 February 2025.

== International career ==
In March 2024, Tatu earned his first international call-up to the Australian national under-17 team for a two-week training camp in Italy. In June, Tatu was recalled into the under-17s side for the ASEAN U-16 Boys Championship, hosted at Surakarta, Indonesia. After Australia qualified from the group stage, Tatu scored a brace in a 5–3 semi-final win over Indonesia on 1 July. Australia won the cup from a 8–7 penalty shoot-out win over Thailand, after a 1–1 draw in regular time.

Tatu was named in the under-17s squad for the 2025 U-17 Asian Cup in March 2025. His side would fail to progress to the knockout stage, due to goal difference, despite a 3–2 win over Japan in the final match.

== Personal life ==
Born in North Adelaide, Tatu attended Underdale High School and Sports College South Australia for his high school education, although much work was spent away from school due to football.

Tatu is of Burundi descent and has been compared towards Nestory Irankunda, who is also of Burundi descent, for his pace and goal-scoring abilities. He formed his playing style similar towards players he idolised, stating to have looked up to Elvis Kamsoba, Ousmane Dembélé, and Lionel Messi from his early childhood.

== Career statistics ==
=== Club ===
As of match played 1 November 2026

Appearances and goals by club, season and competition
Club	Season	League			Cup (Note: Includes Australia Cup)		Continental (Note: Includes AFC Champions League Two)		Total	
Club	Season	Division	Apps	Goals	Apps	Goals	Apps	Goals	Apps	Goals
Adelaide United Youth	2023	NPL SA	2	0	—		—		2	0
Adelaide United Youth	2024	NPL SA	15	6	—		—		15	6
Adelaide United Youth	2025	NPL SA	19	8	—		—		19	8
Adelaide United Youth	Total		36	14	—		—		36	14
Adelaide United	2024–25	A-League Men	3	0	0	0	—		3	0
Adelaide United	2025–26	A-League Men	5	0	0	0	—		5	0
Adelaide United	2026–27	A-League Men	2	0	1	0	3	0	6	0
Adelaide United	Total		10	0	1	0	3	0	14	0
Career total			46	14	1	0	3	0	50	14

== Honours ==
Australia U17

- ASEAN U-16 Boys Championship: 2024
