= Manahan Stadium =

Stadium in Surakarta, Indonesia

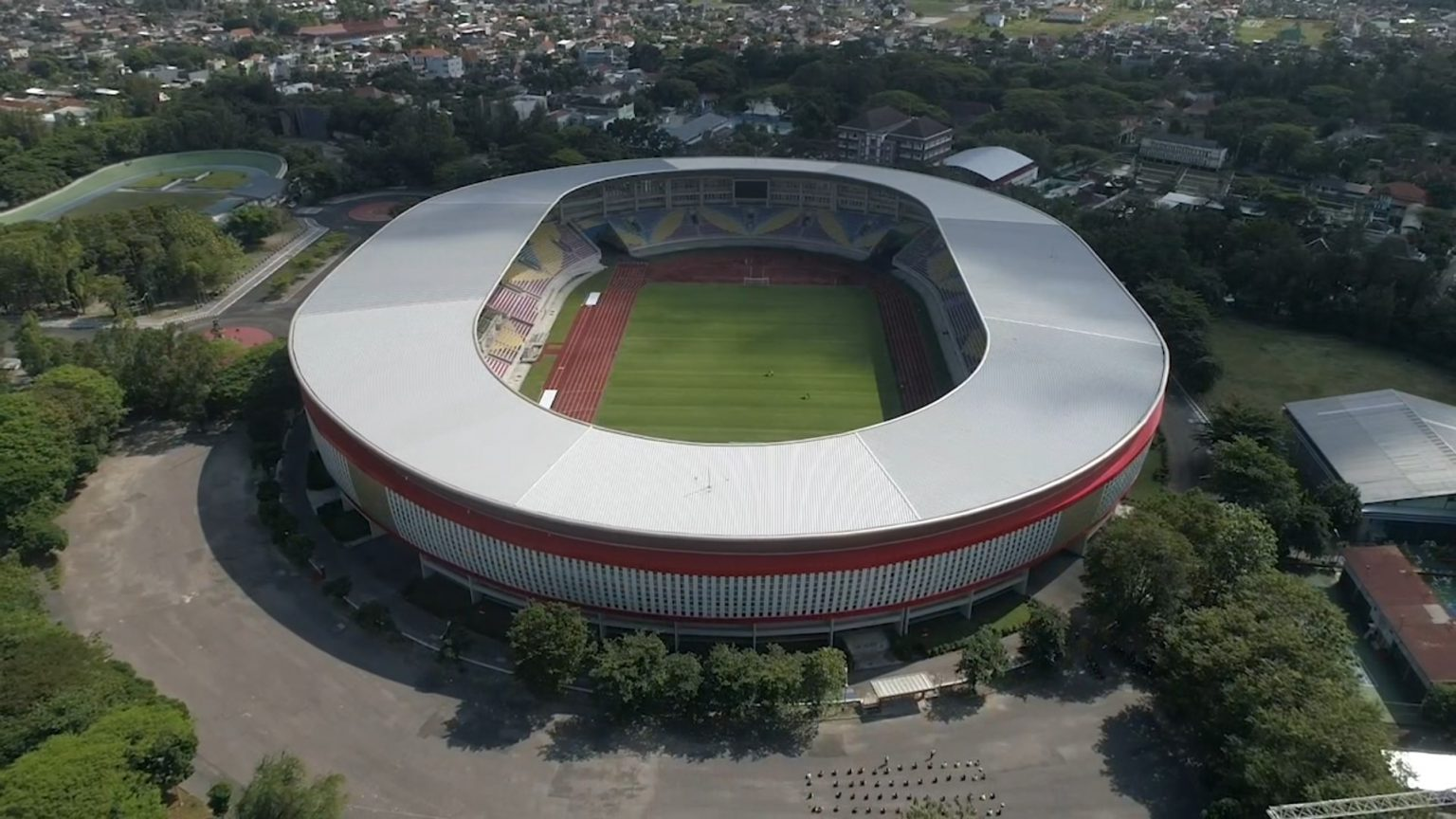
- Interactive map of Manahan Stadium
- Full name: Manahan Stadium; Stadion Manahan
- Location: Adi Sucipto Street, Manahan, Surakarta, Central Java
- Coordinates: 7°33′20″S 110°48′23″E
- Operator: Government of Surakarta
- Capacity: 20,000
- Surface: Bermuda grass
- Public transit: Batik Solo Trans: Corridor 4, Corridor 5 (Stadion Manahan)

Construction
- Opened: 21 February 1998; 28 years ago
- Renovated: 2018–2019
- Closed: 2018–2019
- Reopened: 15 February 2020; 6 years ago

Tenant
- Persis Solo (2006–2017, 2020–present)

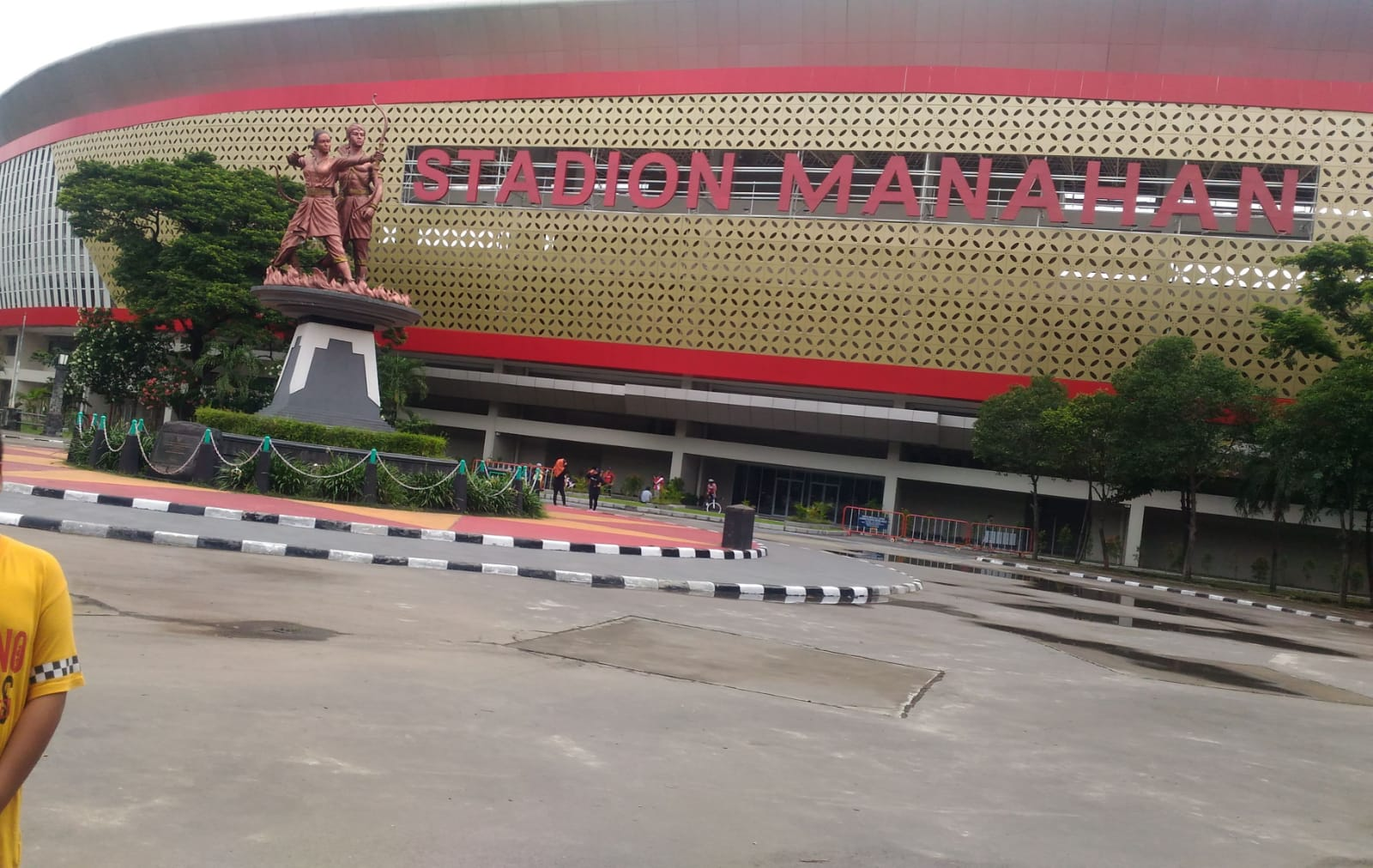
Manahan Stadium in Surakarta city, Indonesia

Manahan Stadium (Indonesian: Stadion Manahan) is a multi-purpose stadium in Surakarta, Central Java, Indonesia. Manahan is the first stadium in Indonesia which hosts the biggest disabled sporting event in Southeast Asia, the 2011 ASEAN Para Games. The stadium was opened on 21 February 1998. It is currently used mostly for association football matches and is used as the home venue for Persis Solo. This stadium now holds 20,000 spectators after the renovation.

Judging from the geographical location, the location of Manahan Stadium in Solo is fairly strategic. Stands majestically in the middle of the city center, adjacent to airports, hotels, highways and shopping malls make Manahan Stadium as one of the most representative in the organization of sporting events of national and international scale. The stadium is located in the center of the city of Solo, precisely at Jalan Adi Sucipto, Manahan, Banjarsari, Solo. It is 9 km away from the Adisumarmo International Airport.

Manahan Stadium was subsequently chosen to host the 2022 ASEAN Para Games and the 2023 FIFA U-17 World Cup matches, including the semi-finals and final. It also acted as the home ground for the Indonesia national football team for the 2024 ASEAN Championship.

== History ==
Manahan Stadium was built in 1989 using land area of 170,000 m^{2} and a building area of 33,300 m^{2}. On 21 February 1998, the stadium was inaugurated by the then-Indonesian President Suharto.

== Other Facilities ==
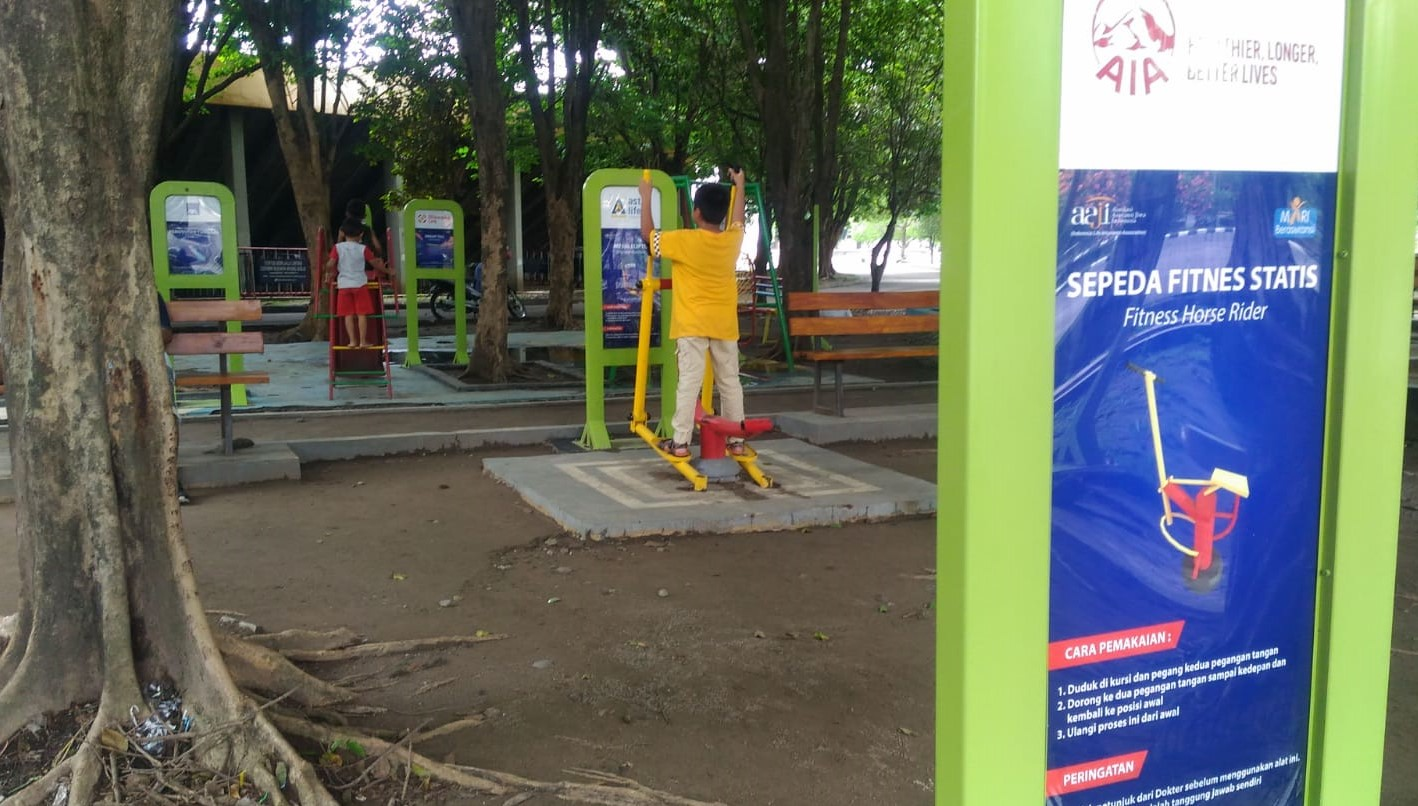
Manahan Stadium facilities in Surakarta

Facilities into one building stadiums with tracks including the track Manahan / international-standard athletics, dressing room, heating room, health room, a secretariat, a journalist and a press conference room, other facilities are located in the stadium track long jump, table tennis, judo training, fight training degrees, etc.

While at Manahan's own complex, sports facilities are available even somewhat more complete and varied as there are tennis courts, baseball field, velodrome, volleyball court, basketball court, badminton court, table tennis room, billiard room, 3 football pitches, and multi-purpose indoor stadium.

== Further development ==
Revitalization of the stadium was in September, 2019. After renovation, it is expected to transform into a mini Bung Karno Stadium (GBK). Single-seating was installed which reduced the stadium's capacity from 25,000 to 20,000. The stadium is equipped with a standard broadcast lighting system of 2,200 to 2,400 lux. Sophisticated CCTV installed to support security with emergency conditions also be designed to be emptied within 15 minutes.

== Sporting events ==
- 2006 Liga Indonesia Final between Persik Kediri vs PSIS Semarang
- 2007 AFC Champions League as home of Persik Kediri
- 2010 Piala Indonesia final between Arema Indonesia vs Sriwijaya
- 2010 AFF U-16 Youth Championship
- 2011 and 2022 ASEAN Para Games
- 2013 AFC Cup as home of Persibo Bojonegoro
- 2017 Indonesia President's Cup quarter-finals
- 2018 Indonesia President's Cup quarter-finals
- 2024 AFC U-23 Asian Cup qualification, Group K
- 2023 FIFA U-17 World Cup
- 2024 ASEAN U-16 Boys Championship
- 2024 Indonesian National Paralympic Week
- 2024 ASEAN Championship

== International football matches ==
| Date | Competition | Team 1 | Score | Team 2 | Attendance |
|---|---|---|---|---|---|
| 22 August 2011 | Friendly | Indonesia | 4–1 | Palestine | |
| 14 August 2013 | Friendly | Indonesia | 2–0 | Philippines | |
| 6 September 2016 | Friendly | Indonesia | 3–0 | Malaysia | |
| 15 December 2024 | 2024 ASEAN Championship | Indonesia | 3–3 | Laos | 14,455 |
| 21 December 2024 | 2024 ASEAN Championship | Indonesia | 0–1 | Philippines | 17,390 |

=== 2023 FIFA U-17 World Cup ===
| Date | Team 1 | Score | Team 2 | Round | Attendance |
|---|---|---|---|---|---|
| 10 November 2023 | Mali | 3–0 | Uzbekistan | Group stage | 3,014 |
| 10 November 2023 | Spain | 2–0 | Canada | Group stage | 6,613 |
| 13 November 2023 | Spain | 1–0 | Mali | Group stage | 4,723 |
| 13 November 2023 | Uzbekistan | 3–0 | Canada | Group stage | 6,919 |
| 16 November 2023 | Uzbekistan | 2–2 | Spain | Group stage | 5,554 |
| 16 November 2023 | Ecuador | 1–1 | Panama | Group stage | 7,956 |
| 20 November 2023 | Ecuador | 1–3 | Brazil | Round of 16 | 3,580 |
| 20 November 2023 | Spain | 2–1 | Japan | Round of 16 | 8,587 |
| 25 November 2023 | France | 1–0 | Uzbekistan | Quarter-finals | 5,201 |
| 25 November 2023 | Mali | 1–0 | Morocco | Quarter-finals | 8,589 |
| 28 November 2023 | Argentina | 3–3 (2–4 p) | Germany | Semi-finals | 8,525 |
| 28 November 2023 | France | 2–1 | Mali | Semi-finals | 12,013 |
| 1 December 2023 | Argentina | 0–3 | Mali | Third place play-off | 10,901 |
| 2 December 2023 | Germany | 2–2 (4–3 p) | France | Final | 13,037 |

== Gallery ==
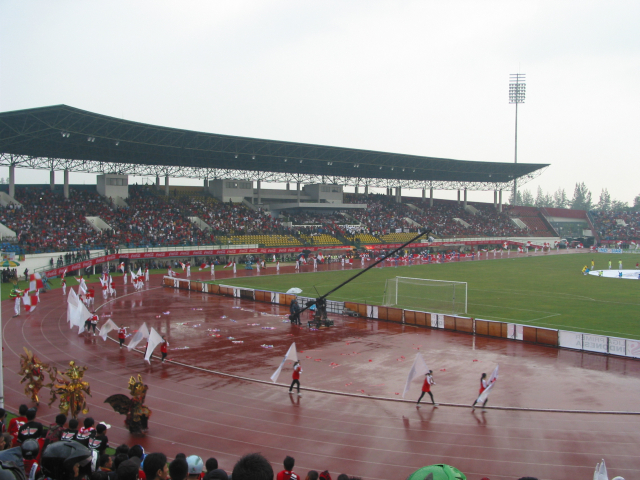
Manahan in 2011, prior to the major renovation

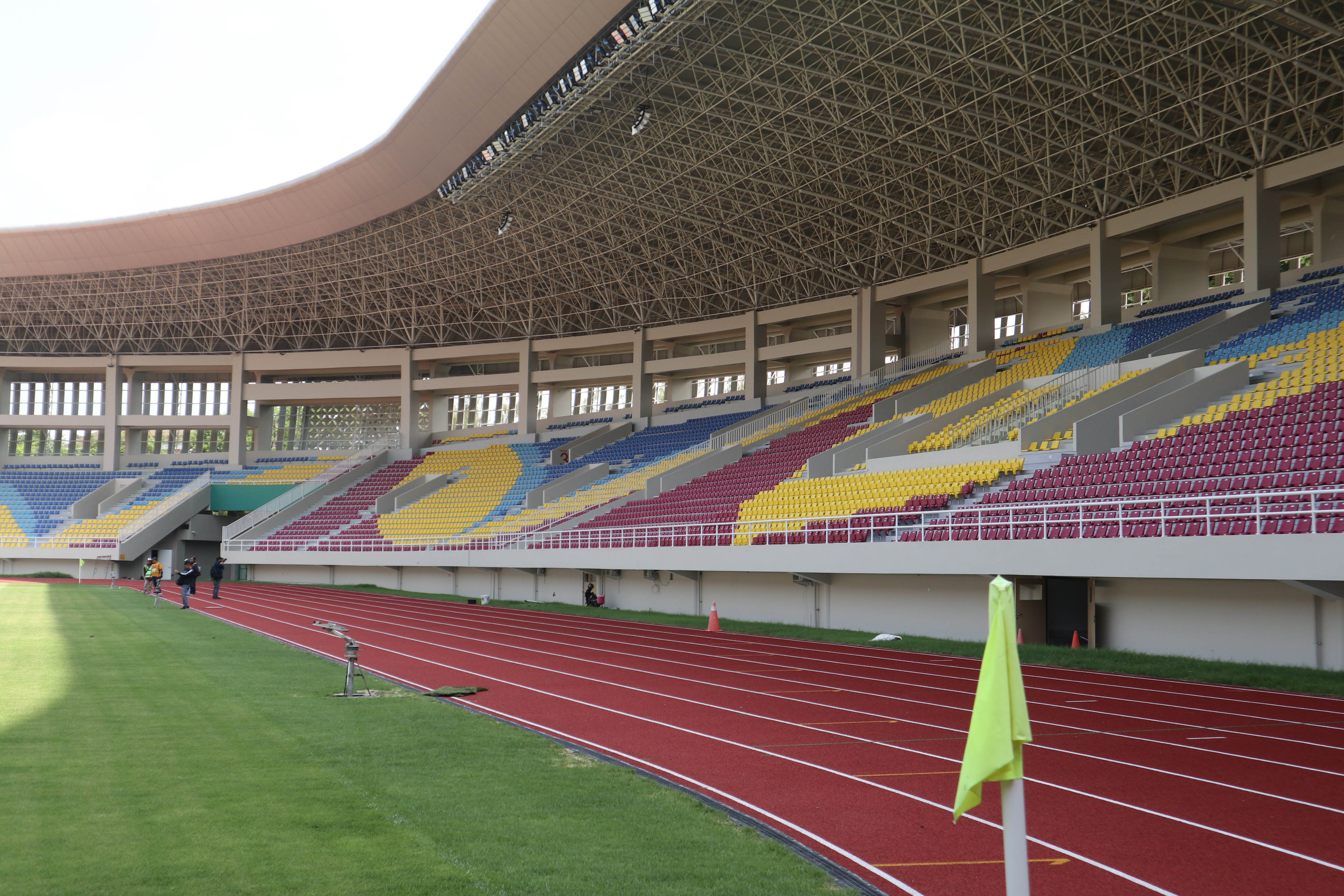
Manahan in December 2019

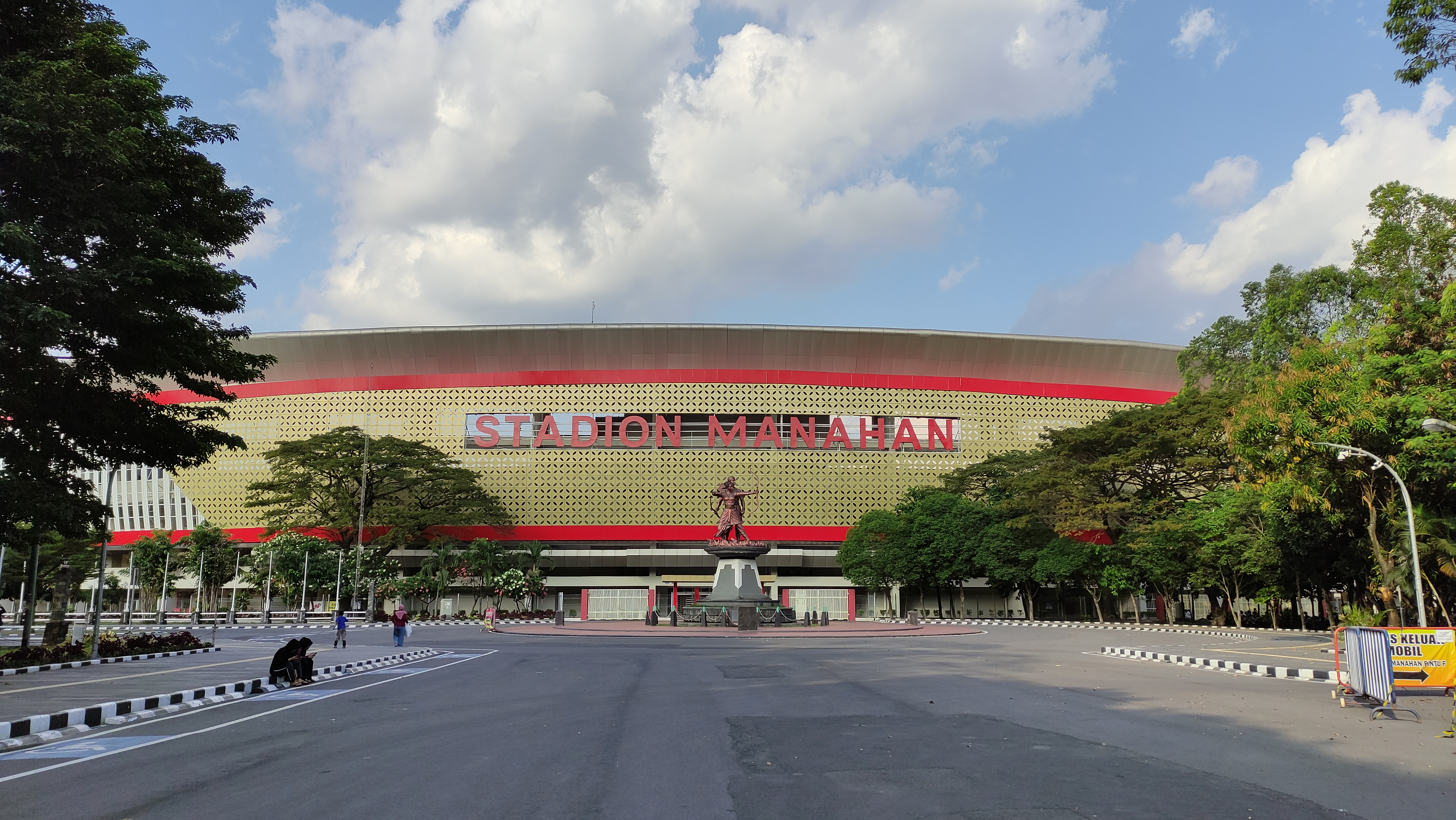
View of the front yard of Manahan Stadium

== See also ==
- List of stadiums in Indonesia
