= 2021–22 Brisbane Roar FC season =

Brisbane Roar
2021–22 season
- Chairman: Rahim Soekasah
- Manager: Warren Moon
- Stadium: Moreton Daily Stadium
- A-League Men: 11th
- FFA Cup: Quarter-finals
- Top goalscorer: League: Juan Lescano (6); All: Juan Lescano (7)
- Highest home attendance: 7,127 (25 April 2022 vs. Melbourne Victory
- Lowest home attendance: 1,600 (30 March 2022 vs. Wellington Phoenix
- Average home league attendance: 4,500
Home colours	Away colours

The 2021–22 season is Brisbane Roar's 16th season in the A-League and their 27th season in professional football. Brisbane Roar is also participating in the FFA Cup for the 7th time.

== Players ==
=== First team squad ===
As of 5 November 2021

Note: Flags indicate national team as defined under FIFA eligibility rules; some limited exceptions apply. Players may hold more than one non-FIFA nationality.

No.	Pos.	Nation	Player
1	GK	AUS	Macklin Freke
2	DF	AUS	Scott Neville
3	DF	AUS	Corey Brown
4	DF	AUS	Anton Mlinaric (on loan from Sydney FC)
5	DF	SCO	Tom Aldred (captain)
6	DF	AUS	Connor Chapman
7	MF	AFG	Rahmat Akbari
8	MF	GER	Matti Steinmann
9	FW	AUS	Luke Ivanovic
10	FW	AUS	Nikola Mileusnic
11	MF	AUS	Jez Lofthouse
12	GK	AUS	Jordan Holmes

No.	Pos.	Nation	Player
13	FW	AUS	Henry Hore
15	MF	AUS	Jesse Daley
16	DF	AUS	Josh Brindell-South
18	FW	JPN	Ryo Wada (on loan from Sagan Tosu)
19	DF	AUS	Jack Hingert
21	MF	AUS	Nick Olsen
22	FW	AUS	Alex Parsons
23	FW	ARG	Juan Lescano
26	MF	IRL	Jay O'Shea
27	DF	AUS	Kai Trewin (scholarship)
29	FW	AUS	Cyrus Dehmie (scholarship)
35	MF	AUS	Louis Zabala

== Transfers ==
=== Transfers in ===
No.	Position	Player	Transferred from	Type/fee	Contract length	Date	Ref
8	MF	(Germany) Matti Steinmann	(India) East Bengal	Free transfer	2+ years	16 June 2021	
10	FW	Nikola Mileusnic	(Denmark) Randers FC	Free transfer	1 year	22 June 2021	
9	FW	Luke Ivanovic	Unattached	Free transfer	2+ years	5 August 2021	
23	FW	(Argentina) Juan Lescano	(Russia) Yenisey Krasnoyarsk	Free transfer	1 year	6 August 2021	
12	GK	Jordan Holmes	Unattached	Free transfer	2 years	14 September 2021	
11	MF	Jez Lofthouse	(Australia) Olympic FC	Free transfer	2 years	27 September 2021	
13	FW	Henry Hore	(Australia) South Melbourne	Free transfer	1 year	28 September 2021	
21	MF	Nick Olsen	(Kuwait) Khaitan SC	Free transfer	1 year	24 October 2021	
4	DF	Anton Mlinaric	Sydney FC	Loan	3 months	25 October 2021	
24	GK	(New Zealand) Aidan Munford	Unattached	Free transfer		5 November 2021	
18	FW	(Japan) Ryo Wada	(Japan) Sagan Tosu	Loan	5 months	4 February 2022	
6	DF	Connor Chapman	Unattached	Free transfer	1.5 years	11 February 2022	

==== From youth squad ====
N	Pos.	Nat.	Name	Age	Notes
35	MF	(Australia)	Louis Zabala	20	

=== Transfers out ===
No.	Position	Player	Transferred to	Type/fee	Date	Ref
6	DF	(England) Macaulay Gillesphey	(England) Plymouth Argyle	End of contract	16 June 2021	
10	MF	(Japan) Riku Danzaki	(Japan) Hokkaido Consadole Sapporo	End of loan	17 June 2021	
11	FW	Joe Champness	Newcastle Jets	End of loan	17 June 2021	
22	MF	Antonee Burke-Gilroy	Unattached	End of contract	17 June 2021	
29	DF	Jordan Courtney-Perkins	Unattached	End of contract	17 June 2021	
23	FW	Dylan Wenzel-Halls	Western United	End of contract	22 June 2021	
17	FW	Golgol Mebrahtu	Unattached	End of contract	22 June 2021	
21	GK	(England) Jamie Young	Western United	Mutual contract termination	1 August 2021	
9	FW	(Japan) Masato Kudo	Unattached	Mutual contract termination	7 August 2021	
28	DF	Izaack Powell	Unattached	End of contract	11 October 2021	
24	GK	(New Zealand) Aidan Munford	(Australia) Lions FC	End of contract	20 January 2022	

=== Contract extensions ===
No.	Name	Position	Duration	Date	Notes
27	Kai Trewin	Defender			

== Pre-season and friendlies ==
28 August 2021 Friendly	Football Wide Bay Select XI (Queensland)	1–13	Brisbane Roar	Nikenbah, Australia
17:00	Haack ?'	Report	Ridenton ?'; Parsons ?', ?'; Ivanovic ?'; Lofthouse ?', ?'; Akbari ?'; Dehmie ?', ?'; Adams ?'; Mileusnic ?'; Daley ?'; Jelacic ?'	Stadium: Fraser Coast Sports and Recreation Precinct; Referee: Alex King

29 September 2021 Friendly	Brisbane Roar	6–0	(Queensland) Capalaba FC	Gold Coast, Australia
19:30	Akbari ?'; Mileusnic ?'; Neville ?'; Lofthouse ?'; Parsons ?'; Steinmann ?'	Report		Stadium: Gold Coast Sports Precinct

31 October 2021 Friendly	Brisbane Roar	2–0	Adelaide United	Ipswich, Australia
14:00 AEST	Akbari 6', 8'	Report		Stadium: North Ipswich Reserve

6 November 2021 Friendly	Brisbane Roar	3–1	(Queensland) BRFC Invitational XI	Brisbane, Australia
15:00 AEST	Daley 29'; Mileusnic 56'; Steinmann 86'	Report	Courtney-Perkins 80' (pen.)	Stadium: Underwood Park

13 November 2021 Friendly	NPL Queensland All-Stars	3–2	Brisbane Roar	Brisbane, Australia
17:00 AEST	Jelacic 30' (pen.); Adams 44'; Ono 68'	Report	Ivanovic 5'; Akbari 27'	Stadium: Perry Park

== Competitions ==
Win Draw Loss Cancelled or postponed

=== Overview ===
Competition	First match	Last match	Starting round	Record							
Competition	First match	Last match	Starting round	Pld	W	D	L	GF	GA	GD	Win %
A-League	19 November 2021	10 May 2022	Matchday 1	26	7	5	14	29	39	−10	26.92
FFA Cup	14 September 2021	12 January 2022	Round of 32	3	2	0	1	7	1	+6	66.67
Australia Cup	13 May 2022	13 May 2022	Preliminary Round	1	1	0	0	3	1	+2	100.00
Total				30	10	5	15	39	41	−2	33.33

Last updated: 13 May 2022
Source: Competitions

=== FFA Cup ===
14 September 2021 Round of 32	Peninsula Power (Queensland)	0–3	Brisbane Roar	Kippa-Ring
19:30 AEST		Report	Steinmann 20'; Ivanovic 33'; Lescano 87'	Stadium: Moreton Daily Stadium; Attendance: 2,905; Referee: Adam Kersey

24 October 2021 Round of 16	Lions FC (Queensland)	0–4	Brisbane Roar	Brisbane
15:30 AEST		Report	Brown 8' (pen.); Dehmie 50', 78', 84'	Stadium: Lions Stadium; Attendance: 2,465; Referee: Rachel Mitchenson

12 January 2022 Quarter-finals	Sydney FC	1–0	Brisbane Roar	Sydney
18:00 AEDT	Kamsoba 63'	Report		Stadium: Netstrata Jubilee Stadium; Attendance: 1,200; Referee: Tim Danaskos

=== Australia Cup ===
13 May 2022 Preliminary Rounds	Western Sydney Wanderers	1–3	Brisbane Roar	Sydney
19:30 AEST	Carluccio 8'	Report	Dehmie 51'; Ivanovic 58', 75'	Stadium: Blacktown Football Park

=== A-League ===
==== League table ====
Pos	Team	Pld	W	D	L	GF	GA	GD	Pts	Qualification
8	Sydney FC	26	8	7	11	37	44	−7	31	
9	Newcastle Jets	26	8	5	13	45	43	+2	29	Qualification for 2022 Australia Cup play-offs (Note: The top 8 teams qualify for the round of 32, while the bottom four teams participate in a play-off round.)
10	Western Sydney Wanderers	26	6	9	11	30	38	−8	27	Qualification for 2022 Australia Cup play-offs
11	Brisbane Roar	26	7	5	14	29	39	−10	26	Qualification for 2022 Australia Cup play-offs
12	Perth Glory	26	4	6	16	20	43	−23	18	Qualification for 2022 Australia Cup play-offs

Source: A-Leagues
Rules for classification: 1) Points; 2) Goal difference; 3) Goals scored; 4) Points per game; 5) Least red cards; 6) Least yellow cards; 7) Toss of a coin in an event of a tie of two clubs.

==== Matches ====
19 November 2021 1	Melbourne City	2–1	Brisbane Roar	Melbourne
19:45 AEDT	Good 40'; Metcalfe 43'	Report	Ivanovic 71'	Stadium: AAMI Park; Attendance: 7,213; Referee: Jonathon Barreiro

28 November 2021 2	Melbourne Victory	3–0	Brisbane Roar	Melbourne
16:45 AEDT	Trewin 27' (o.g.); D'Agostino 31'; Folami 50'	Report		Stadium: AAMI Park; Attendance: 13,026; Referee: Alex King

4 December 2021 3	Brisbane Roar	0–0	Adelaide United	Brisbane
16:45 AEST		Report		Stadium: Moreton Daily Stadium; Attendance: 6,549; Referee: Chris Beath

11 December 2021 4	Western United	1–0	Brisbane Roar	Geelong
17:05 AEDT	Pain 50'	Report		Stadium: GMHBA Stadium; Attendance: 2,845; Referee: Jonathon Barreiro

15 January 2022 10	Sydney FC	1–1	Brisbane Roar	Sydney
17:45 AEST	Caceres 34'	Report	Mileusnic 40'	Stadium: Netstrata Jubilee Stadium; Attendance: 4,098; Referee: Jack Morgan

19 January 2022 5	Brisbane Roar	1–0	Perth Glory	Brisbane
18:45 AEST	Hore 77'	Report		Stadium: Moreton Daily Stadium; Attendance: 5,637; Referee: Alireza Faghani

23 January 2022 11	Brisbane Roar	1–3	Adelaide United	Brisbane
16:45 AEST	Mileusnic 2'	Report	Goodwin 24' (pen.), 85'; Mauk 85'	Stadium: Moreton Daily Stadium; Attendance: 5,269; Referee: Jonathon Barreiro

29 January 2022 12	Brisbane Roar	3–0	Western Sydney Wanderers	Brisbane
18:45 AEST	Mileusnic 27', 65'; Akbari 74'	Report		Stadium: Moreton Daily Stadium; Attendance: 5,137; Referee: Lachlan Keevers

3 February 2022 13	Newcastle Jets	2–1	Brisbane Roar	Newcastle
18:45 AEST	Freke 22' (o.g.); Thurgate 70'	Report	Lescano 64'	Stadium: McDonald Jones Stadium; Attendance: 3,109; Referee: Jonathon Barreiro

13 February 2022 14	Brisbane Roar	3–1	Macarthur FC	Brisbane
18:45 AEDT	Mileusnic 2'; Brown 60'; Hore 78'	Report	Mariappa 74'	Stadium: Moreton Daily Stadium; Attendance: 4,691; Referee: Kurt Ams

16 February 2022 8	Wellington Phoenix	3–0	Brisbane Roar	Sydney
17:25 AEDT	Wootton 33'; Sandoval 63'; Piscopo 67'	Report		Stadium: Leichhardt Oval; Attendance: 38; Referee: Alex King

20 February 2022 15	Perth Glory	2–0	Brisbane Roar	Launceston
16:05 AEDT	Fornaroli 8' (pen.), 73'	Report		Stadium: UTAS Stadium; Attendance: 1,146; Referee: Daniel Elder

5 March 2022 17	Central Coast Mariners	2–1	Brisbane Roar	Gosford
17:05 AEDT	Nkololo 49'; Müller 55'	Report	Lescano 69'	Stadium: Central Coast Stadium; Attendance: 3,275; Referee: Chris Beath

12 March 2022 18	Brisbane Roar	2–1	Wellington Phoenix	Brisbane
17:05 AEDT	Akbari 7'; Hore 76'	Report	Hooper 72'	Stadium: Moreton Daily Stadium; Attendance: 5,883; Referee: Tim Danaskos

19 March 2022 19	Perth Glory	1–4	Brisbane Roar	Perth
21:05 AEDT	Stynes 90+2'	Report	Lescano 40', 58'; O'Shea 81' (pen.); Ivanovic 89'	Stadium: HBF Park; Attendance: 4,593; Referee: Adam Kersey

23 March 2022 6	Brisbane Roar	1–2	Melbourne City	Brisbane
19:35 AEDT	Hore 9'	Report	Trewin 14' (o.g.); Rodrigues 49'	Stadium: Moreton Daily Stadium; Attendance: 3,059; Referee: Kurt Ams

26 March 2022 20	Brisbane Roar	2–3	Western United	Brisbane
17:05 AEDT	Lescano 3'; O'Shea 88' (pen.)	Report	Bayew 35'; Neville 59' (o.g.); Prijović 83'	Stadium: Moreton Daily Stadium; Attendance: 4,935; Referee: Adam Kersey

30 March 2022 22	Brisbane Roar	0–3	Wellington Phoenix	Brisbane
19:05 AEST		Report	Neville 28' (o.g.); Waine 48'; Old 57'	Stadium: Moreton Daily Stadium; Attendance: 1,600; Referee: Shaun Evans

3 April 2022 21	Brisbane Roar	2–0	Newcastle Jets	Brisbane
16:05 AEST	Hore 83'; Ivanovic 90+3'	Report		Stadium: Moreton Daily Stadium; Attendance: 5,463; Referee: Chris Beath

9 April 2022 23	Western Sydney Wanderers	1–1	Brisbane Roar	Sydney
17:05 AEST	Hingert 41' (o.g.)	Report	O'Shea 90+2' (pen.)	Stadium: CommBank Stadium; Attendance: 5,233; Referee: Jack Morgan

12 April 2022 7	Melbourne Victory	0–0	Brisbane Roar	Melbourne
19:05 AEST		Report		Stadium: AAMI Park; Attendance: 6,127; Referee: Kurt Ams

15 April 2022 24	Macarthur FC	2–1	Brisbane Roar	Sydney
19:45 AEDT	Dávila 44'; McGing 89'	Report	Neville 78'	Stadium: Campbelltown Stadium; Attendance: 2,809; Referee: Daniel Elder

25 April 2022 16	Brisbane Roar	1–1	Melbourne Victory	Brisbane
14:05 AEST	Parsons 54'	Report	Hamill 68'	Stadium: Moreton Daily Stadium; Attendance: 7,127; Referee: Lachlan Keevers

30 April 2022 26	Adelaide United	2–0	Brisbane Roar	Adelaide
19:45 AEST	Blackwood 15'; Ibusuki 28'	Report		Stadium: Coopers Stadium; Attendance: 6,761; Referee: Ben Abraham

3 May 2022 9	Brisbane Roar	0–2	Central Coast Mariners	Brisbane
19:05 AEST		Report	Miller 40'; Kuol 63'	Stadium: Moreton Daily Stadium; Attendance: 1,652; Referee: Tim Danaskos

10 May 2022 25	Brisbane Roar	3–1	Sydney FC	Brisbane
19:05 AEST	Parsons 36'; Lescano 40'; Ivanovic 67'	Report	Burgess 30'	Stadium: Moreton Daily Stadium; Attendance: 1,727; Referee: Adam Kersey

== Statistics ==
=== Appearances and goals ===
Players with no appearances not included in the list.

As of 13 May 2022

No.	Pos.	Nat.	Name	A-League		FFA Cup		Australia Cup play-off		Total	
No.	Pos.	Nat.	Name	Apps	Goals	Apps	Goals	Apps	Goals	Apps	Goals
1	GK	(Australia)	Macklin Freke	12(1)	0	3	0	0	0	16	0
2	DF	(Australia)	Scott Neville	25	1	3	0	0	0	28	1
3	DF	(Australia)	Corey Brown	10(2)	1	2	1	0	0	14	2
4	DF	(Australia)	Anton Mlinaric	6(5)	0	0	0	0	0	4	0
5	DF	(Scotland)	Tom Aldred	12	0	2	0	1	0	15	0
6	DF	(Australia)	Connor Chapman	2(2)	0	0	0	1	0	5	0
7	MF	(Afghanistan)	Rahmat Akbari	22(1)	2	2	0	1	0	26	2
8	MF	(Germany)	Matti Steinmann	11(6)	0	3	1	0	0	20	1
9	FW	(Australia)	Luke Ivanovic	9(11)	4	1	1	1	2	22	7
10	MF	(Australia)	Nikola Mileusnic	11(4)	5	3	0	0(1)	0	19	5
11	MF	(Australia)	Jez Lofthouse	1(11)	0	0	0	0	0	14	0
12	GK	(Australia)	Jordan Holmes	14	0	0	0	1	0	15	0
13	MF	(Australia)	Henry Hore	17(6)	5	0	0	0(1)	0	24	5
14	MF	(Australia)	Eli Adams	3(4)	0	0	0	1	0	8	0
15	MF	(Australia)	Jesse Daley	13(9)	0	3	0	0	0	25	0
16	DF	(Australia)	Josh Brindell-South	4(12)	0	0(2)	0	0(1)	0	19	0
18	FW	(Japan)	Ryo Wada	4	0	0	0	0	0	4	0
19	DF	(Australia)	Jack Hingert	16(5)	0	2(1)	0	0	0	24	0
21	MF	(Australia)	Nicholas Olsen	11(8)	0	1(1)	0	1	0	22	0
22	MF	(Australia)	Alex Parsons	7(5)	2	1(2)	0	1	0	16	2
23	FW	(Argentina)	Juan Lescano	12(8)	6	0(2)	1	1	0	23	7
26	MF	(Republic of Ireland)	Jay O'Shea	26	3	1(1)	0	1	0	29	3
27	DF	(Australia)	Kai Trewin	25	0	3	0	1	0	29	0
29	FW	(Australia)	Cyrus Dehmie	6(8)	0	1(2)	3	1	1	18	4
35	MF	(Australia)	Louis Zabala	7(8)	0	0	0	1	0	16	0
37	DF	(Australia)	Jackson Hart-Phillips	0	0	0(1)	0	0	0	1	0
35	MF	(Australia)	Sam Klein	0(1)	0	0	0	0	0	1	0

=== Disciplinary record ===
As of 14 September 2021

Rank	No.	Pos.	Nat.	Name	A-League		FFA Cup		Total	
Rank	No.	Pos.	Nat.	Name	Booked	Sent off (straight red)	Booked	Sent off (straight red)	Booked	Sent off (straight red)
1	8	MF	(Germany)	Matti Steinmann	0	0	1	0	1	0
Totals					0	0	1	0	1	0

=== Clean sheets ===
As of 13 May 2022

Rank	No.	Pos.	Nat.	Name	A-League	FFA Cup	Australia Cup play-off	Total
1	1	GK	(Australia)	Macklin Freke	3	2	0	5
2	12	GK	(Australia)	Jordan Holmes	2	0	0	2
Total					5	2	0	7

== See also ==
- 2021–22 in Australian soccer
- List of Brisbane Roar FC seasons
