= List of Brisbane Roar FC seasons =

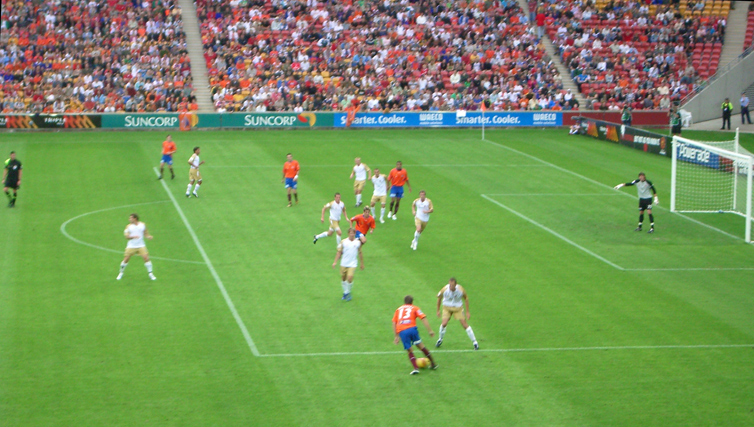
Roar playing at home in 2006.

Brisbane Roar Football Club is an association football club based in Milton, Queensland.

The club was formed in 1957 as Hollandia-Inala FC and entered the new National A-League in 2005 as Queensland Roar (having withdrawn from the QLD State competition the previous year).

== Key ==
Key to league competitions:

- A-League Men (A-League/A-League Men) – Australia's top soccer league, established in 2005

Key to colours and symbols:

1st or W	Winners
2nd or RU	Runners-up
3rd	Third
↑	Promoted
↓	Relegated

Key to league record:

- Season = The year and article of the season
- Pos = Final position
- Pld = Games played
- W = Games won
- D = Games drawn
- L = Games lost
- GF = Goals scored
- GA = Goals against
- Pts = Points

Key to cup record:

- En-dash (–) = Brisbane Roar did not participate
- R32 = Round of 32
- R16 = Round of 16
- QF = Quarter-finals
- SF = Semi-finals
- RU = Runners-up
- W = Winners

== Seasons ==
Results of league and cup competitions by season
Season	Competition	P	W	D	L	F	A	Pts	Pos	Finals	National Cup	Competition	Result	Name	Goals
Season	League									Finals	National Cup	Other / Asia		Top goalscorer	
2005–06	A-League	21	7	7	7	27	22	28	6th	—	Group	—	—	Alex Brosque	8
2006–07	A-League	21	8	5	8	25	27	29	5th	—	Group	—	—	Dario Vidošić	5
2007–08	A-League	21	8	7	6	25	21	31	4th	PF	3rd	—	—	Reinaldo	9
2008–09	A-League	21	10	6	5	36	25	36	3rd	PF	Group	—	—	Sergio van Dijk	12
2009–10	A-League	27	8	6	13	32	42	30	9th	—	—	—	—	Sergio van Dijk	13
2010–11	A-League	30	18	11	1	58	26	65	1st	W	—	—	—	Kosta Barbarouses	12
2011–12	A-League	27	14	7	6	50	28	49	2nd	W	—	Champions League	Group	Besart Berisha	23
2012–13	A-League	27	10	5	12	33	29	35	5th	SF	—	Champions League	QPO	Besart Berisha	14
2013–14	A-League	27	16	4	7	43	25	52	1st	W	—	—	—	Besart Berisha	13
2014–15	A-League	27	10	4	13	42	43	34	6th	EF	R16	—	—	Henrique	9
2015–16	A-League	27	14	6	7	49	40	48	3rd	SF	R32	—	—	Jamie Maclaren	18
2016–17	A-League	27	11	9	7	43	37	42	3rd	SF	R32	Champions League	Group	Jamie Maclaren	23
2017–18	A-League	27	10	5	12	3	39	35	6th	EF	R32	Champions League	PF2	Massimo Maccarone	10
2018–19	A-League	27	4	6	17	38	71	18	9th	—	R32	—	—	Adam Taggart	11
2019–20	A-League	26	11	7	8	29	28	40	4th	EF	R16	—	—	Scott McDonald, Roy O'Donovan	7
2020–21	A-League	26	11	7	8	36	28	40	4th	EF	—	—	—	Riku Danzaki	9
2021–22	A-League Men	26	7	5	14	29	39	26	11th	—	QF	—	—	Juan Lescano	7
2022–23	A-League Men	26	7	9	10	26	33	30	8th	—	SF	—	—	Jay O'Shea	10
2023–24	A-League Men	27	8	6	13	42	55	30	9th	—	RU	—	—	Thomas Waddingham	11
2024–25	A-League Men	26	5	6	15	32	51	21	12th	—	PO	—	—	Sam Klein	5
