= 2025–26 Tanjong Pagar United FC season =

Tanjong Pagar United
2025–26 season
- Chairman: Raymond Tang
- Coach: Noh Alam Shah (Interim, From 2 Dec 2024)
- Ground: Jurong East Stadium
- S.League: TBD
- Singapore Cup: TBD
- Top goalscorer: League: TBD; All: TBD
- Highest home attendance: TBD
- Lowest home attendance: TBD
- Average home league attendance: TBD
Home colours	Away colours

The 2025–26 season is Tanjong Pagar United's 20th season at the top level of Singapore football. It will be their sixth consecutive season in the Singapore Premier League. The club will also compete in the Singapore Cup.

== Squad ==
=== Singapore Premier League ===
As of 15 Feb 2026

No.	Name	Nationality	Date of Birth (Age)	Last club	Contract Since	Contract End
Goalkeepers
1	Matt Silva	(Canada) (Portugal)	28 March 1991 (age 35)	(Philippines) Loyola (P1)	2025	2026
12	Kenji Syed Rusydi	(Singapore)	12 July 1998 (age 28)	(Singapore) Hougang United	2025	2026
18	Sunny Tia Yang Guang	(Singapore)	25 February 2004 (age 22)	(Singapore) BG Tampines Rovers U21	2025	2026
19	Zaiful Nizam	(Singapore)	24 July 1987 (age 39)	(Singapore) Hougang United	2025	2026
30	Ryan Effendy	(Singapore)		(Singapore) Tanjong Pagar United U21	2023	2026
31	Hazwan Afiq	(Singapore)		(Singapore) Tanjong Pagar United U21	2025	2026
Defenders
3	Syahrul Sazali	(Singapore)	3 June 1998 (age 28)	(Japan) Albirex Niigata (S)	2025	2026
4	Kim Li-Kwan	(South Korea)	2 April 2003 (age 23)	(South Korea) Ansan Greeners (K3)	2025	2026
5	Syed Akmal	(Singapore)	28 April 2000 (age 26)	(Singapore) Young Lions	2023	2026
15	Faizal Roslan	(Singapore)	30 May 1995 (age 31)	(Singapore) Geylang International	2023	2026
23	Danish Haqimi	(Singapore)	22 March 2007 (age 19)	(Singapore) Young Lions	2025	2026
24	Aaron Evans	(Australia) (Croatia)	21 November 1994 (age 31)	(Maldives) Maziya (M1)	2025	2026
27	Aiqel Aliman	(Singapore)	2 April 2004 (age 22)	(Singapore) Tanjong Pagar United U21	2024	2026
40	Haziq Zulkifli	(Singapore)		(Singapore) Tanjong Pagar United U17	2025	2026
41	Hafid Sohan Rifa'i	(Singapore)		Singapore Football Club	2025	2026
42	Erfan Nurhan Fazly	(Singapore)	19 August 2009 (age 17)	(Singapore) Hougang United U17	2025	2026
44	Lee Chan-woo	(South Korea)	30 November 2004 (age 21)	(South Korea) Ansan Greeners (K3)	2026	2026
Midfielders
2	Azim Akbar	(Singapore) (Pakistan)	17 December 2001 (age 24)	(Singapore) Tanjong Pagar United U21	2021	2026
6	Fathullah Rahmat	(Singapore)	5 September 2002 (age 24)	(Singapore) Young Lions	2021	2026
8	Jesse Daley	(Australia)	16 October 1997 (age 28)	(Canada) Cavalry (C1)	2025	2026
16	Raihan Rahman	(Singapore)	7 February 1991 (age 35)	(Singapore) Yishun Sentek Mariners (SFL1)	2025	2026
17	Naqiuddin Eunos	(Singapore)	1 December 1997 (age 28)	(Singapore) Geylang International	2025	2026
20	Emilio Estevez	(Chinese Taipei) (Canada)	10 August 1998 (age 28)	(Chinese Taipei) Hang Yuan (T1)	2025	2026
22	Naufal Ilham	(Singapore)	16 August 2002 (age 24)	(Singapore) SAFSA	2021	2026
25	Shodai Nishikawa	(Japan)	21 September 1993 (age 33)	(Cambodia) Angkor Tiger (C1)	2024	2026
28	Aloysius Pang	(Singapore)	22 April 2004 (age 22)	(Singapore) Tanjong Pagar United U21	2023	2026
34	Samuel Pillai	(Singapore)	22 February 2005 (age 21)	(Singapore) Young Lions	2025	2026
37	Lim Xuan Hui	(Singapore)		(Singapore) Tanjong Pagar United U15	2025	2026
38	Vinnie Ucchino	(Australia) (Croatia) (Italy)	29 April 2010 (age 16)	(Singapore) Tanjong Pagar United U15	2025	2026
66	Anaqi Ismit	(Singapore)	24 August 2001 (age 25)	(Singapore) Lion City Sailors	2024	2026
Forwards
11	Zenivio	(Timor-Leste)	22 April 2005 (age 21)	(Cambodia) Kirivong Sok Sen Chey (C1)	2024	2026
14	Syahadat Masnawi	(Singapore)	7 November 2001 (age 24)	(Singapore) Young Lions	2024	2026
21	Vabio Canavaro	(Timor-Leste)	25 January 2007 (age 19)	(Timor-Leste) SLB Laulara	2026	2026
32	Sahil Suhaimi	(Singapore)	8 July 1992 (age 34)	(Singapore) Hougang United	2024	2026
35	Lim Kai Pin	(Singapore)			2025	2026
36	Danny Ali	(Singapore)	2 April 2009 (age 17)	(Singapore) Tanjong Pagar United U17	2025	2026
39	Darius Lai Jyun Tang	(Singapore)	15 January 2009 (age 17)	(Singapore) Tanjong Pagar United U17	2025	2026
43	Nils Carballeira	(Norway)		(Singapore) Tanjong Pagar United U17	2026	2026
45	Junior Djile	(Italy) (Ivory Coast)	11 October 2001 (age 24)	(Malta) Hamrun Spartans	2026	2026
47	Izrafil Yusof	(Singapore)	27 January 2004 (age 22)	(Singapore) Young Lions	2026	2026
Players left during season
Players on NS
7	Zahil Rahman	(Singapore)	3 March 2003 (age 23)	(Singapore) Tanjong Pagar United U21	2023	2025
Players who left during mid-season
7	Guilherme Rodrigues	(Brazil)	24 May 1995 (age 31)	(Portugal) SC Pombal (Amateur)	2025	2026
9	Youssef Ezzejjari	(Spain) (Morocco)	10 May 1993 (age 33)	(Indonesia) Madura United (I1)	2025	2026
10	Bruno Dybal	(Brazil)	3 March 1994 (age 32)	(Indonesia) Semen Padang (I1)	2025	2026
13	Emmeric Ong	(Singapore)	25 January 1991 (age 35)	(Singapore) Balestier Khalsa	2025	2026
21	Farid Jafri (D)	(Singapore)	5 January 2004 (age 22)	(Singapore) Tanjong Pagar United U21	2023	2026
26	Saiful Azhar Saifuddin (F)	(Singapore)	19 December 2004 (age 21)	(Singapore) Tanjong Pagar United U21	2023	2026
29	Risvi Aaqil (F)	(Singapore)	7 September 2005 (age 21)	(Singapore) Tanjong Pagar United U21	2023	2026
33	Aymeric Ngankam	(Switzerland)	9 May 2005 (age 21)	(Switzerland) FC Winkeln SG (S4)	2025	2026
77	Lim Hyun-Sub	(South Korea)	16 January 2006 (age 20)	(South Korea) Suwon Samsung Bluewings (K2)	2025	2026

Remarks:
^{FP U21} These players are registered as U21 foreign players.

=== Women Squad (2026) ===
As of 14 Mar 2021

No.	Name	Nationality	Date of Birth (Age)	Last club	Contract Since	Contract End
Goalkeepers
1	Ilya Batrisyia	(Singapore)		(Singapore)		2026
24	Vanessa Tan	(Singapore)		(Singapore)		2026
Defenders
2	Abigail Goh Su En	(Singapore)		(Singapore) Still Aerion WFC	2024	2026
4	Shayeerah Huq	(Singapore)		(Singapore)		2026
5	Naomi Tan Ni Wa	(Singapore)		(Singapore) Nanyang Polytechnic		2026
12	Gan Hui Yi	(Singapore)		(Singapore)		2026
13	Anupriya Subramanian	(Singapore)		(Singapore) Still Aerion WFC	2025	2026
Midfielders
7	Nur Syakirah Jumain	(Singapore)		(Singapore) BG Tampines Rovers		2026
10	Nuriah Noor	(Singapore)		(Singapore)	2024	2026
11	Alyssa Deanna Yazrin	(Singapore)	6 December 1999 (age 26)	(Singapore)	2024	2026
14	Denise Chu	(Singapore)		(Singapore)		2026
15	Crystal Wu	(Singapore)	13 September 2006 (age 20)	(Singapore)		2026
23	Abigail Heng Rae Ern	(Singapore)		(Singapore)		2026
Forwards
9	Matthea Ashwini	(Singapore)		(Singapore) Balestier Khalsa		2026
17	Nur Faradila Rafidi	(Singapore)	15 October 1998 (age 27)	(Singapore) Albirex Niigata (S)		2026
22	Pan Shi Yu	(Singapore)		(Singapore)		2026
Players who left during mid-season

== Coaching staff ==
Position	Name	Ref.
Chairman	(Singapore) Raymond Tang	
General Manager	(Singapore) Desmund Khusnin	
Technical Director	(Singapore)	
Team Manager	(Singapore)	
Head Coach	(Singapore) Noh Alam Shah	
Head Coach (Women)	(Singapore) Samawira Basri	
Assistant Coach	(Singapore) Isa Halim (Singapore) Indra Sahdan (Singapore) Ismail Yunos	
Goalkeeping Coach	(Singapore) (Australia) Scott Starr (Singapore) Fajar Sarib	
Head of Youth & U21 Coach	(Singapore) Jaslee Hatta	
U19 Coach	(Singapore) Indra Sahdan	
U17 Coach	(Singapore) Ridhuan Muhammad	
U15 Coach	(Singapore) Ismail Yunos (Singapore) Raihan Rahman	
U15 Goalkeeper Coach	(Singapore) Rizal Rahman	
Fitness Coach	(Singapore) Razif Ariff	
Physiotherapist	(Singapore) Fadhli Hussein	
Sport Scientist	(Singapore) Mukhlis Sawit	
Kitman	(Singapore) Azwan Hishamuddin	
Video Analyst	(Singapore) Razif Ariff	

== Pre-season friendlies ==
Win Draw Loss

28 July 2025 1	Negeri Sembilan (Malaysia)	5–1	(Singapore) Tanjong Pagar United	Negeri Sembilan, Malaysia
				Stadium: Tuanku Abdul Rahman Stadium

20 August 2025 1	Tanjong Pagar United (Singapore)	3–1	(Malaysia) Johor Darul Ta'zim III	Jurong East
	Naqiuddin Eunos; Youssef Ezzejjari; Shodai Nishikawa		Zamir Zairi 50'	Stadium: Jurong East Stadium; Referee: Syarqawi Buhari

== Transfers ==
=== In ===
Preseason

Date (Note: Date of club's announcement, will be either date of club announcement or 1 Jun-2025, the date which the free agent start due to lapse of previous contract)	Position	Player	Transferred from	Ref
First team
4 July 2025	GK	(Singapore) Zaiful Nizam	(Singapore) Hougang United	Free
4 July 2025	GK	(Singapore) Kenji Syed Rusydi	(Singapore) Hougang United	Free
4 July 2025	DF	(Singapore) Syahrul Sazali	(Singapore) BG Tampines Rovers	Free
5 July 2025	GK	(Singapore) Sunny Tia Yang Guang	(Singapore) BG Tampines Rovers U21	Free
7 July 2025	MF	(Singapore) Naqiuddin Eunos	(Singapore) Geylang International	Free
9 July 2025	DF	(South Korea) Kim Li-Kwan	(South Korea) Ansan Greeners	Free
9 July 2025	DF	(Australia) (Croatia) Aaron Evans	(Maldives) Maziya	Free
9 July 2025	MF	(Australia) Jesse Daley	(Canada) Cavalry	Free
9 July 2025	MF	(Chinese Taipei) (Canada) Emilio Estevez	(Chinese Taipei) Hang Yuan	Free
9 July 2025	MF	(Brazil) Bruno Dybal	(Indonesia) Semen Padang	Free
9 July 2025	FW	(Brazil) Guilherme Rodrigues	(Portugal) SC Pombal	Free
25 July 2025	DF	(Singapore) Emmeric Ong	(Singapore) Balestier Khalsa	Free
25 July 2025	FW	(Spain) (Morocco) Youssef Ezzejjari	(Indonesia) Barito Putera	Free
11 August 2025	DF	(Switzerland) Aymeric Ngankam	(Switzerland) FC Winkeln SG	Free
1 September 2025	MF	(South Korea) Lim Hyun-Sub	(South Korea) Suwon Samsung Bluewings	Season loan till Jan-26
SPL2, U23 & Academy
1 July 2025	FW	(Singapore) Darius Lai Jyun Tang	(Japan) Albirex Niigata (S) U17	Free
11 July 2025	DF	(Singapore) Danish Haqimi	(Singapore) Young Lions	Free
11 August 2025	MF	(Singapore) Samuel Pillai	(Singapore) Young Lions	Free
11 August 2025	FW	(Singapore) Lim Kai Pin	(Singapore)	Free

Mid-season

Date (Note: Date of club's announcement, will be either date of club announcement or 1 Jun-2025, the date which the free agent start due to lapse of previous contract)	Position	Player	Transferred from	Ref
First Team
5 January 2026	MF	(Singapore) Anaqi Ismit	(Singapore) SAFSA	End of NS
5 January 2026	MF	(South Korea) Lee Chan-woo	Free Agent	N.A.
11 January 2026	FW	(Singapore) Izrafil Yusof	(Singapore) Lion City Sailors	Season loan
10 February 2026	FW	(Timor-Leste) Vabio Canavaro	(Timor-Leste) SLB Laulara	Free
15 February 2026	FW	(Italy) (Ivory Coast) Junior Djile	(Malta) Hamrun Spartans	Free
SPL2, U23 & Academy

=== Promoted ===
Preseason

Date (Note: Date of club's announcement, will be either date of club announcement or 1 Jun-2025, the date which the free agent start due to lapse of previous contract)	Position	Player	Team	Ref
4 July 2025	GK	(Singapore) Ryan Effendy	First professional contract	1-year contract from Jul 2025 till Jun 2026
4 July 2025	GK	(Singapore) Hazwan Afiq	First professional contract	1-year contract from Jul 2025 till Jun 2026
4 July 2025	DF	(Singapore) Aiqel Aliman	First professional contract	1-year contract from Jul 2025 till Jun 2026
4 July 2025	MF	(Singapore) Aloysius Pang	First professional contract	1-year contract from Jul 2025 till Jun 2026
4 July 2025	FW	(Singapore) Saiful Azhar Saifuddin	First professional contract	1-year contract from Jul 2025 till Jun 2026
4 July 2025	FW	(Singapore) Risvi Aaqil	First professional contract	1-year contract from Jul 2025 till Jun 2026
11 August 2025	FW	(Singapore) Danny Ali	First professional contract	1-year contract from Jul 2025 till Jun 2026
31 August 2025	MF	(Croatia) (Italy) (Australia) Vinnie Ucchino	First professional contract	1-year contract from Jul 2025 till Jun 2026
31 August 2025	MF	(Singapore) Xuan Hui	First professional contract	1-year contract from Jul 2025 till Jun 2026

Mid Season

Date (Note: Date of club's announcement, will be either date of club announcement or 1 Jun-2025, the date which the free agent start due to lapse of previous contract)	Position	Player	Team	Ref
1 December 2025	FW	(Singapore) Darius Lai Jyun Tang	1-year contract from Dec 2025 till Jun 2026	
3 February 2026	FW	(Norway) Nils Carballeira	1-year contract from Feb 2026 till Jun 2026	

=== Out ===
Preseason

Date (Note: Date of club's announcement, will be either date of club announcement or 1 Jun-2025, the date which the free agent start due to lapse of previous contract)	Position	Player	Transferred To	Ref
First team
15 May 2025	DF	(Singapore) Shahrin Saberin	Retired	Free
31 May 2025	MF	(Singapore) Rezza Rezky	(Singapore) BG Tampines Rovers	End of loan
31 May 2025	DF	(Singapore) Marcus Mosses	(Singapore) Lion City Sailors U21	End of loan
31 May 2025	FW	(Singapore) Izrafil Yusof	(Singapore) Lion City Sailors U21	End of loan
10 July 2025	DF	(Uzbekistan) Timur Talipov	(India) Aizawl	Free
10 July 2025	GK	(Singapore) (Japan) Kimura Riki	(Singapore) Geylang International	Free
10 July 2025	GK	(Singapore) Prathip Ekamparam	(Singapore) SAFSA	Free
10 July 2025	MF	(Singapore) Hariysh Krishnakumar	(Singapore)	Free
10 July 2025	MF	(Singapore) Suhairi Sabri	(Singapore)	Free
10 July 2025	MF	(Singapore) Umar Ramle	(Singapore) Lion City Sailors (Note: To play mainly SPL2 squad)	Free
10 July 2025	MF	(Japan) Tomoki Wada	(Australia) Sydney United 58	Free
10 July 2025	MF	(France) (Mali) Salif Cissé		Free
SPL2, U23 & Academy
31 May 2025	MF	(Singapore) Uvayn Kumar	(Singapore) Lion City Sailors U21	End of loan
1 July 2025	FW	(Indonesia) Fariz Fadilla	(Indonesia) Sriwijaya (I2)	Free
31 July 2025	DF	(England) (Wales) (Thailand) (Singapore) George Thomas		Free
31 July 2025	DF	(Singapore) Ihsan Hadi	(Singapore)	Free
31 July 2025	DF	(Singapore) Rayyan Ramzdan	(Singapore)	Free
31 July 2025	DF	(Singapore) Uvayn Kumar	(Singapore)	Free
31 July 2025	MF	(Singapore) Ahmad Danial	(Singapore) Lion City Sailors	Free
31 July 2025	MF	(Singapore) Arsyad Basiron	(Singapore)	Free
31 July 2025	MF	(Singapore) Daniel Elfian	(Singapore)	Free
31 July 2025	MF	(France) (Sweden) (Finland) (Singapore) Thelonious Linden		Free
31 July 2025	MF	(England) (Japan) Casey Seddon		Free
31 July 2025	MF	(Australia) Thorsten Takashi Cross		Free
31 July 2025	FW	(France) Enzo Saha	(Singapore) International Lions (Cosmoleague)	Free
31 July 2025	FW	(Singapore) Miqdad Shah	(Singapore)	Free

Mid-season

Date (Note: Date of club's announcement, will be either date of club announcement or 1 Jun-2025, the date which the free agent start due to lapse of previous contract)	Position	Player	Transferred To	Ref
First team
2 January 2026	MF	(South Korea) Lim Hyun-Sub	(South Korea) Suwon Samsung Bluewings	End of Loan
3 January 2026	DF	(Switzerland) Aymeric Ngankam	(Switzerland)	Free
31 January 2026	MF	(Brazil) Bruno Dybal	N.A. (Note: Bruno joins Kasetsart on 7 August 2026)	Free
31 January 2026	FW	(Brazil) Guilherme Rodrigues	(Portugal)	Free
1 February 2026	DF	(Singapore) Emmeric Ong	Retired	N.A.
1 February 2026	FW	(Spain) (Morocco) Youssef Ezzejjari	(India) East Bengal	Free
SPL2, U23 & Academy

=== National Service ===
Preseason

Position	Player	Transferred To	Ref
MF	(Singapore) Anaqi Ismit	(Singapore) SAFSA	NS till June 2026
FW	(Singapore) Zahil Rahman	(Singapore) SAFSA	NS till June 2026

Mid-season

Position	Player	Transferred To	Ref
DF	(Singapore) Farid Jafri	(Singapore) SAFSA	NS till Sept 2027
FW	(Singapore) Saiful Azhar Saifuddin	(Singapore) SAFSA	NS till Sept 2027
FW	(Singapore) Risvi Aaqil	(Singapore) SAFSA	NS till Sept 2027

=== Extension / Retained ===
Date	Position	Player	Ref
First team
1 July 2025	DF	(Singapore) Faizal Roslan	1-year extension from Jul 2025 till Jun 2026
1 July 2025	DF	(Singapore) Farid Jafri	1-year extension from Jul 2025 till Jun 2026
1 July 2025	DF	(Singapore) Syed Akmal	1-year extension from Jul 2025 till Jun 2026
1 July 2025	MF	(Singapore) Naufal Ilham	1-year extension from Jul 2025 till Jun 2026
1 July 2025	MF	(Singapore) Fathullah Rahmat	1-year extension from Jul 2025 till Jun 2026
1 July 2025	MF	(Singapore) Raihan Rahman	1-year extension from Jul 2025 till Jun 2026
1 July 2025	MF	(Singapore) Azim Akbar	1-year extension from Jul 2025 till Jun 2026
1 July 2025	FW	(Singapore) Sahil Suhaimi	1-year extension from Jul 2025 till Jun 2026
1 July 2025	FW	(Singapore) Syahadat Masnawi	1-year extension from Jul 2025 till Jun 2026
7 July 2025	GK	(Canada) (Portugal) Matt Silva	1-year extension from Jul 2025 till Jun 2026
7 July 2025	MF	(Japan) (Singapore) Shodai Nishikawa	1-year extension from Jul 2025 till Jun 2026
7 July 2025	MF	(Timor-Leste) Zenivio	1-year extension from Jul 2025 till Jun 2026

== Friendly ==
=== Pre-season ===
Win Draw Loss

Tour of Malaysia (25 July – 2 August)

26 July 2025 1	Machan FC (Malaysia)	–	(Singapore) Tanjong Pagar United	Melaka, Malaysia
				Stadium: Henry Gurney Stadium

28 July 2025 2	Negeri Sembilan FC (Malaysia)	5–1	(Singapore) Tanjong Pagar United	Seremban, Malaysia
	Luis Enrique Nsue 18'; Joseph Esso 19', 73'; N.Javabilaarivin 84'; Mio Tsuneyasu 90'		Youssef Ezzejjari 80'	Stadium: Tuanku Abdul Rahman Stadium

== Team statistics ==
=== Appearances and goals (SPL) ===
As of 18 May 26

Numbers in parentheses denote appearances as substitute.

No.	Pos.	Player	SPL		Singapore Cup		Total	
No.	Pos.	Player	Apps.	Goals	Apps.	Goals	Apps.	Goals
1	GK	(Canada) (Portugal) Matt Silva	5+2	0	1	0	8	0
2	MF	(Singapore) Azim Akbar	4+10	0	0+1	0	15	0
3	DF	(Singapore) Syahrul Sazali	11+3	0	2+1	0	17	0
4	DF	(South Korea) Kim Li-Kwan	19	0	2	0	21	0
5	DF	(Singapore) Syed Akmal	8+1	0	2	0	11	0
6	MF	(Singapore) Fathullah Rahmat	14+4	0	0+1	0	19	0
8	MF	(Australia) Jesse Daley	2	0	0	0	2	0
11	FW	(Timor-Leste) Zenivio	17+2	2	1	0	20	2
12	GK	(Singapore) Kenji Syed Rusydi	1	0	1	0	2	0
14	FW	(Singapore) Syahadat Masnawi	2+4	0	0	0	6	0
15	DF	(Singapore) Faizal Roslan	12+5	0	3+1	0	21	0
16	MF	(Singapore) Raihan Rahman	16+1	0	4	0	21	0
17	MF	(Singapore) Naqiuddin Eunos	13+7	0	4	0	24	0
18	GK	(Singapore) Sunny Tia Yang Guang	0	0	0	0	0	0
19	GK	(Singapore) Zaiful Nizam	15	0	2	0	17	0
20	MF	(Chinese Taipei) (Canada) Emilio Estevez	15+2	3	0+2	0	18	3
21	FW	(Timor-Leste) Vabio Canavaro	6+5	0	0	0	11	0
22	MF	(Singapore) Naufal Ilham	0	0	0	0	0	0
23	MF	(Singapore) Danish Haqimi	0	0	1+1	0	2	0
24	DF	(Australia) (Croatia) Aaron Evans	8+1	0	4	0	13	0
25	MF	(Japan) Shodai Nishikawa	9+2	0	4	0	15	0
27	DF	(Singapore) Aiqel Aliman	0	0	0	0	0	0
28	MF	(Singapore) Aloysius Pang	0	0	0	0	0	0
30	GK	(Singapore) Ryan Effendy	0	0	0	0	0	0
31	GK	(Singapore) Hazwan Afiq	0	0	0	0	0	0
32	FW	(Singapore) Sahil Suhaimi	5+9	0	1+1	0	16	0
34	MF	(Singapore) Sam Pillay	2+3	0	0+1	0	4	0
35	FW	(Singapore) Lim Kai Pin	0	0	0	0	0	0
36	FW	(Singapore) Danny Ali	0	0	0	0	0	0
37	MF	(Singapore) Xuan Hui	0	0	0	0	0	0
38	MF	(Croatia) (Italy) (Australia) Vinnie Ucchino	0+1	0	0+1	0	2	0
43	MF	(Norway) Nils Carballeira	0	0	0	0	0	0
44	MF	(South Korea) Lee Chan-woo	15	0	0	0	15	0
45	FW	(Italy) (Ivory Coast) Junior Djile	12	2	0	0	12	2
47	FW	(Singapore) Izrafil Yusof	2+3	0	0	0	5	0
66	MF	(Singapore) Anaqi Ismit	1+11	1	0	0	12	1
Players who have played this season but had left on loan to other club
Players who have played this season but had left the club permanently for other club
7	FW	(Brazil) Guilherme Rodrigues	3+2	0	0	0	5	0
9	FW	(Spain) (Morocco) Youssef Ezzejjari	6	5	4	2	10	7
10	MF	(Brazil) Bruno Dybal	4+2	3	4	1	10	4
13	DF	(Singapore) Emmeric Ong	1	0	0	0	1	0
33	DF	(Switzerland) Aymeric Ngankam	0	0	0	0	0	0
77	MF	(South Korea) Lim Hyun-Sub	4	0	4	0	8	0

== Competitions ==
=== Overview ===
Competition	Record							
Competition	P	W	D	L	GF	GA	GD	Win %

=== Singapore Premier League ===
Win Draw Loss

25 September 2025 1 (Rescheduled)	Tanjong Pagar United (Singapore)	5–1	(Singapore) Young Lions	Jurong East
	Youssef Ezzejjari 35', 62', 64', 76'; Bruno Dybal 86'; Fathullah Rahmat (yellow card) 25'; Guilherme Rodrigues (yellow card) 45+6'; Syahrul Sazali (yellow card) 81'		Abner Vinicius 15'; Iryan Fandi (yellow card) 43'	Stadium: Jurong East Stadium; Referee: Syarqawi Buhari; Man of the Match: (Spain) Youssef Ezzejjari

13 September 2025 2	Tanjong Pagar United (Singapore)	0–3	(Singapore) BG Tampines Rovers	Jurong East
	Raihan Rahman (yellow card) 59'; Youssef Ezzejjari (yellow card) 88'; Guilherme Rodrigues (yellow card) 89'; Zenivio (yellow card) 90+4'	Report	Takeshi Yoshimoto 43'; Glenn Kweh 48'; Koya Kazama 86'	Stadium: Jurong East Stadium; Referee: Clarence Leow; Man of the Match: (Japan) Seiga Sumi

22 September 2025 3 (Rescheduled)	Tanjong Pagar United (Singapore)	0–7	(Singapore) Lion City Sailors	Jurong East
		Report	Lennart Thy 14', 45+7'; Diogo Costa 28'; Rui Pires 45+10'; Song Ui-young 45+14'; Anderson Lopes 84', 90+3'	Stadium: Jurong East Stadium; Referee: Farhan Mohd; Man of the Match: (Germany) Lennart Thy

18 October 2025 4	Geylang International (Singapore)	2–1	(Singapore) Tanjong Pagar United	Tampines
	Nikola Ignjatovic 41' (yellow card) 13'; Ryoya Taniguchi 81'; Ko Jae-hyun (yellow card) 18'; Nazrul Nazari (yellow card) 80'; Ryu Hardy (yellow card) 90+5'	Report	Bruno Dybal 72' (yellow card) 90'; Kim Li-Kwan (yellow card) 41'	Stadium: Our Tampines Hub; Referee: Syarqawi Buhari; Man of the Match: (Japan) Ryoya Taniguchi

24 October 2025 5	Balestier Khalsa (Singapore)	2–1	(Singapore) Tanjong Pagar United	Bishan
	Masahiro Sugita 62'; Daniel Goh 80' (yellow card) 90+1'		Bruno Dybal 23'; Kim Li-Kwan (yellow card) 18'; Zenivio (yellow card) 58'; Shodai Nishikawa (yellow card) 68' (yellow-red card) 85'; Youssef Ezzejjari (yellow card) 90+8'	Stadium: Bishan Stadium; Referee: Ahmad A'Qashah; Man of the Match: (Japan) Masahiro Sugita

18 May 2026 6 (Rescheduled)	Tanjong Pagar United (Singapore)	2–1	(Singapore) Hougang United	Jurong East
	Anaqi Ismit 90+1' (yellow card) 88'; Zenivio 90+7' (yellow card) 90+7'; Kim Li-Kwan (yellow card) 43'		Saifullah Akbar 65' (yellow card) 78'; Nabilai Kibunguchy (yellow card) 34'; Huzaifah Aziz (yellow card) 36'; Chonlawit Kanuengkid (yellow card) 40'	Stadium: Jurong East Stadium; Referee: Taufik Thana; Man of the Match: (Timor-Leste) Zenivio

17 January 2026 7	Albirex Niigata (S) (Japan)	3–2	(Singapore) Tanjong Pagar United	Jurong East
	Cho Eun-su 42'; Takumi Yokohata 52'; Nozomi Ozawa 86'; Kim Tae-uk (yellow card) 72'	Report	Youssef Ezzejjari 55'; Anaqi Ismit 84'; Bruno Dybal (yellow card) 38'; Lee Chan-woo (yellow card) 51'	Stadium: Jurong East Stadium; Referee: Taufik Thana; Man of the Match: (South Korea) Cho Eun-su

26 January 2026 8	Young Lions (Singapore)	1–1	(Singapore) Tanjong Pagar United	Jalan Besar
	Sergio Mendonça 26'; Andrew Aw (yellow card) 23'; Luth Harith (yellow card) 49'; Kieran Teo (yellow card) 87'; Enrico Walmrath (yellow card) 90+5'		Zenivio 45+8'; Raihan Rahman (yellow card) 36'; Fathullah Rahmat (yellow card) 54'; Aaron Evans (yellow card) 90+1'	Stadium: Jalan Besar Stadium; Referee: Taufik Thana; Man of the Match: (Brazil) Abner Vinicius

31 January 2026 9	BG Tampines Rovers (Singapore)	2–1	(Singapore) Tanjong Pagar United	Tampines
	Hide Higashikawa 6'; Shah Shahiran 35'; Shuya Yamashita (yellow card) 80'	Report	Emilio Estevez 65'; Kim Li-Kwan (yellow card) 33'; Noh Alam Shah (yellow card) 84'	Stadium: Our Tampines Hub; Referee: Thawfeek Ahamad; Man of the Match: (Singapore) Shah Shahiran

6 February 2026 10	Tanjong Pagar United (Singapore)	1–3	(Singapore) Geylang International	Jurong East
	Emilio Estevez 90' (pen.); Raihan Rahman (yellow card) 46'	Report	Ryoya Taniguchi 11'; Shodai Yokoyama 52'; Vincent Bezecourt 67'; Shakir Hamzah (yellow card) 42'; Joshua Pereira (yellow card) 45+4'; Nazrul Nazari (yellow card) 49'; Amy Recha (yellow card) 56'; Yu Kanoshima (red card) 84'	Stadium: Jurong East Stadium; Referee: Jansen Foo; Man of the Match: (France) Vincent Bezecourt

15 February 2026 11	Lion City Sailors (Singapore)	7–0	(Singapore) Tanjong Pagar United	Jalan Besar
	Bart Ramselaar 4', 74'; Anderson Lopes 19'; Kim Li-Kwan 45+4'; Shawal Anuar 50'; Akram Azman 82'; Lennart Thy 83'; Bailey Wright (yellow card) 46'	Report	Shodai Nishikawa (red card) 15'	Stadium: Jalan Besar Stadium; Referee: Ahmad A'Qashah; Man of the Match: (Netherlands) Bart Ramselaar

23 February 2026 12	Hougang United (Singapore)	3–0	(Singapore) Tanjong Pagar United	Bishan
	Settawut Wongsai 26'; Jaushua Sotirio 32'; Farhan Zulkifli 67'; Chonlawit Kanuengkid (yellow card) 45'; Victor Blasco (yellow card) 60'; Yang He (yellow card) 73'; Zharfan Rohaizad (yellow card) 90+3'		Raihan Rahman (yellow card) 41'; Emilio Estevez (yellow card) 42'; Anaqi Ismit (yellow card) 45+4'; Lee Chan-woo (yellow card) 47'; Azim Akbar (yellow card) 90+3'	Stadium: Bishan Stadium; Referee: Clarence Leow; Man of the Match: (Singapore) Farhan Zulkifli

1 March 2026 13	Tanjong Pagar United (Singapore)	1–4	(Singapore) Balestier Khalsa	Jurong East
	Junior Djile 45+5'; Azim Akbar (yellow card) 68'		Syahadat Masnawi 38' (o.g.); Bogdan Mandić 61', 64'; Lazar Vujanić 79'; Tin Matić (penalty missed) 23; Mario Subarić (yellow card) 40'	Stadium: Jurong East Stadium; Referee: Khairul Amri; Man of the Match: (Serbia) Bogdan Mandić

6 March 2026 14	Tanjong Pagar United (Singapore)	0–2	(Japan) Albirex Niigata (S)	Jurong East
	Junior Djile (yellow card) 13'; Emilio Estevez (yellow card) 85'; Faizal Roslan (yellow card) 90+1'	Report	Abdul Rasaq 22'; Ryang Hyon-ju 35'; Shingo Nakano (yellow card) 48'; Syed Firdaus (yellow card) 55'	Stadium: Jurong East Stadium; Referee: Ahmad A'Qashah; Man of the Match: (North Korea) Ryang Hyon-ju

16 March 2026 15	Tanjong Pagar United (Singapore)	0–3	(Singapore) BG Tampines Rovers	Jurong East
	Junior Djile (yellow card) 42'; Sahil Suhaimi (yellow card) 45+7'; Kim Ri-gwan (yellow card) 64'	Report	Hide Higashikawa 20', 76'; Shah Shahiran 90'; Amirul Haikal (yellow card) 70'	Stadium: Jurong East Stadium; Referee: Ahmad A'Qashah; Man of the Match: (Japan) Hide Higashikawa

6 April 2026 16	Tanjong Pagar United (Singapore)	0–4	(Singapore) Lion City Sailors	Jurong East
	Junior Djile (yellow card) 45+2'; Faizal Roslan (red card) 75'	Report	Lennart Thy 32'; Bart Ramselaar 48'; Bailey Wright 64'; Diogo Costa 90+9'	Stadium: Jurong East Stadium; Referee: Oswind Suriya; Man of the Match: (Australia) Bailey Wright

10 April 2026 17	Tanjong Pagar United (Singapore)	0–1	(Singapore) Young Lions	Jurong East
	Zenivio (yellow card) 60'; Syed Akmal (yellow card) 64'; Emilio Estevez (yellow card) 90+5'		Sergio Mendonça 5'; Abner Vinicius (yellow card) 52'; Ajay Robson (yellow card) 68'	Stadium: Jurong East Stadium; Referee: Hilmi Fuad; Man of the Match: (Singapore) Izwan Mahbud

19 April 2026 18	Geylang International (Singapore)	2–1	(Singapore) Tanjong Pagar United	Tampines
	Riku Fukashiro 33'; Ryoya Taniguchi 83'; Nazrul Nazari (yellow card) 21'; Shuhei Hoshino (yellow card) 87'	Report	Junior Djile 27'; Kim Li-Kwan (yellow card) 9'; Vabio Canavaro (yellow card) 57'; Syahrul Sazali (yellow card) 70'; Raihan Rahman (yellow card) 89'	Stadium: Our Tampines Hub; Referee: Thawfeek Ahamad; Man of the Match: (Japan) Riku Fukashiro

25 April 2026 19	Albirex Niigata (S) (Japan)	4–0	(Singapore) Tanjong Pagar United	Jurong East
	Shingo Nakano 7', 10', 90'; Kim Tae-uk 27'	Report	Raihan Rahman (yellow card) 19'	Stadium: Jurong East Stadium; Referee: Oswind Suriya; Man of the Match: (Japan) Shingo Nakano

5 May 2026 20	Tanjong Pagar United (Singapore)	1–2	(Singapore) Hougang United	Jurong East
	Emilio Estevez 58'; Vabio Canavaro (yellow card) 56'; Lee Chan-woo (yellow card) 74'; Syed Akmal (yellow card) 90+4'		Saifullah Akbar 44' (yellow card) 72'; Farhan Zulkifli 90+1'; Victor Blasco (yellow card) 36' (penalty missed) 78	Stadium: Jurong East Stadium; Referee: Syarqawi Buhari; Man of the Match: (Singapore) Farhan Zulkifli

9 May 2026 21 (Rescheduled)	Balestier Khalsa (Singapore)	6–0	(Singapore) Tanjong Pagar United	Bishan
	Tin Matić 12', 54', 79'; Bogdan Mandić 51'; Jakov Katuša 83'; Ifat Sha'aban 86'; Masahiro Sugita (yellow card) 48'		Jesse Daley (yellow card) 64'	Stadium: Bishan Stadium; Referee: Zulfiqar Mustaffa; Man of the Match: (Croatia) Tin Matić

Pos	Team	Pld	W	D	L	GF	GA	GD	Pts	Qualification or relegation
1	Lion City Sailors (C)	21	16	3	2	70	14	+56	51	Qualification for the AFC Champions League Two (Note: As league champions Lion City Sailors also won the 2025–26 Singapore Cup, the continental place allocated to the cup winners passed to league runners-up BG Tampines Rovers.)
2	BG Tampines Rovers	21	15	4	2	58	21	+37	49	Qualification for the AFC Champions League Two
3	Albirex Niigata (S)	21	15	2	4	47	19	+28	47	
4	Balestier Khalsa	21	11	2	8	44	46	−2	35	
5	Geylang International	21	7	3	11	29	42	−13	24	
6	Hougang United	21	7	0	14	24	41	−17	21	
7	Young Lions (Note: Young Lions were not eligible to qualify for AFC club competitions.)	21	2	3	16	15	58	−43	9	
8	Tanjong Pagar United	21	2	1	18	17	63	−46	7	

Source: Singapore Premier League
Rules for classification: 1) Points; 2) goal difference; 3) goals scored; 4) wins
(C) Champions

=== Singapore Cup ===
==== Round 1 ====
2 November 2025 Rd 1 Match 1	Balestier Khalsa (Singapore)	3–0	(Singapore) Tanjong Pagar United	Bishan
	Tin Matić 37'; Jakov Katuša 77'; Daniel Goh 82'; Madhu Mohana (yellow card) 42'; Harith Kanadi (red card) 45+4'; Darren Teh (yellow card) 89'		Sahil Suhaimi (yellow card) 60' (yellow-red card) 62'; Bruno Dybal (yellow card) 89'	Stadium: Bishan Stadium; Referee: Andrea Verolino; Man of the Match: (Croatia) Jakov Katuša

7 November 2025 Rd 1 Match 2	Tanjong Pagar United (Singapore)	2–3	(Singapore) Hougang United	Jurong East
	Youssef Ezzejjari 83' (pen.); Bruno Dybal 89' (yellow card) 45+1'; Raihan Rahman (yellow card) 53'; Lim Hyun-Sub (yellow card) 90+7'		Farhan Zulkifli 10'; Settawut Wongsai 19', 64'; Yuma Suwa (red card) 51'; Víctor Blasco (yellow card) 84'; Parinya Nusong (yellow card) 87'	Stadium: Jurong East Stadium; Referee: Mazlan Pagira; Man of the Match: (Singapore) Farhan Zulkifli

23 November 2025 Rd 1 Match 3	Albirex Niigata (S) (Japan)	1–0	(Singapore) Tanjong Pagar United	Jurong East
	Katsuyuki Ishibashi 55'		Youssef Ezzejjari (yellow card) 61'	Stadium: Jurong East Stadium; Referee: Zulfiqar Mustaffa; Man of the Match: (Japan) Katsuyuki Ishibashi

6 December 2025 Rd 1 Match 4	Tanjong Pagar United (Singapore)	1–4	(Singapore) Geylang International	Jurong East
	Faizal Roslan (red card) 26'; Raihan Rahman (yellow card) 29'; Aaron Evans (yellow card) 75'; Youssef Ezzejjari 70' (pen.) (yellow card) 90+1'		Shuhei Hoshino 5', 58'; Riku Fukashiro 15'; Vincent Bezecourt 38'; Shahdan Sulaiman (penalty missed) 28; Ryoya Taniguchi (yellow card) 90+2'	Stadium: Jurong East Stadium; Referee: Clarence Leow; Man of the Match: (France) Vincent Bezecourt

== Competition (SPL2) ==
Win Draw Loss

1 September 2025 1	Lion City Sailors (Singapore)	1–3	(Singapore) Tanjong Pagar United	Jurong East
	Naufal Azman 88'; Aaryan Fikri (yellow card) 70' (yellow-red card) 74'; Faisal Shahril (yellow card) 28'		Sahil Suhaimi 4'; Syahrul Sazali 81'; Guilherme Rodrigues 83'; Azim Akbar (yellow card) 64'; Fathullah Rahmat (yellow card) 90'	Stadium: Jurong East Stadium; Referee: Andrea Verolino

9 September 2025 2	Tanjong Pagar United (Singapore)	0–3	(Singapore) Hougang United	Jurong East
	Risvi Aaqil (yellow card) 12'; Farid Jafiri (yellow card) 89'		Hugo Kametani 53', 61'; Settawut Wongsai 75'; Kanok Kongsimma (yellow card) 38'; Huzaifah Aziz (yellow card) 46'; Chonlawit Kanuengkid (yellow card) 89'	Stadium: Jurong East Stadium; Referee: Mazlan Pagira

29 September 2025 3	BG Tampines Rovers (Singapore)	1–3	(Singapore) Tanjong Pagar United	Jurong East
	Kegan Phang; Witthawat Phraothaisong (yellow card) 57'		Risvi Aaqil 10', 15', 30'; Emmeric Ong (yellow card) 44'; Aloysius Pang (yellow card) 56'; Syahrul Sazali (yellow card) 90+4'	Stadium: Jurong East Stadium; Referee: Taufik Thana

14 October 2025 4	Tanjong Pagar United (Singapore)	2–0	(Singapore) Geylang International	Jurong East
	Aymeric Ngankam 1' (yellow card) 25'; Sahil Suhaimi 14'; Naufal Ilham (yellow card) 47'; Bruno Dybal (yellow card) 68'; Danny Ali (yellow card) 86'		Gareth Low (yellow card) 62'; Syafi Suhaimi (yellow card) 74'	Stadium: Jurong East Stadium; Referee: Muhammad Zulfiqar

28 October 2025 5	Balestier Khalsa (Singapore)	3–4	(Singapore) Tanjong Pagar United	Bishan
	Ifat Sha'aban 55', 67', 90'; Karthigaya Varmaan (yellow card) 29'		Emilio Estevez 18'; Sahil Suhaimi 24' (yellow card) 90+9'; Fathullah Rahmat 66' (yellow card) 90+9'; Shodai Nishikawa 90'; Aloysius Pang (yellow card) 83'	Stadium: Bishan Stadium; Referee: Khairul Amri

4 November 2025 6	Young Lions (Singapore)	3–1	(Singapore) Tanjong Pagar United	Jurong East
	Naufal Ilham 11'; Joilson (yellow card) 66'; Enrico Walmrath (yellow card) 78'		Sérgio Mendonça 21', 59'; Nicolas Benninger 68'; Sahil Suhaimi (yellow card) 52'; Danish Haqimi (yellow card) 87'	Stadium: Jurong East Stadium; Referee: Aldrick Lee

10 November 2025 7	Tanjong Pagar United (Singapore)	0–3	(Japan) Albirex Niigata (S)	Jurong East
			Sim Jun Yen 75'; Jaden Heng 83'; Helmi Shahrol 90'	Stadium: Jurong East Stadium; Referee: Taufik Thana

17 November 2025 8	Tanjong Pagar United (Singapore)	4–2	(Singapore) Lion City Sailors	Jurong East
	Aaron Evans 9'; Bruno Dybal 50'; Youssef Ezzejjari 55'; Lee Hyun-sub 81'; Aloysius Pang (yellow card) 72'		Yasir Nizamudin 65'; Ikmal Hazlan 90'	Stadium: Jurong East Stadium; Referee: Muhammad Zulfiqar

3 December 2025 9	Albirex Niigata (S) (Japan)	2–0	(Singapore) Tanjong Pagar United	Jurong East
	Helmi Shahrol 46'; Ren Nishimura 73'; Aqil Zafri (yellow card) 58'; Aneeq Fairus (yellow card) 61'; Syed Firdaus Hassan (yellow card) 68'		Danish Haqimi (yellow card) 59'	Stadium: Jurong East Stadium; Referee: Oswind Suriya

15 December 2025 10	Tanjong Pagar United (Singapore)	4–3	(Singapore) BG Tampines Rovers	Jurong East
	Youssef Ezzejjari 20', 36', 52', 65'; Erfan Azhar (yellow card) 29'; Danish Haqimi (yellow card) 82'; Samuel Pillai (yellow card) 90'		Zikos Chua 23'; Talla Ndao 30', 89'	Stadium: Jurong East Stadium; Referee: Taufik Thana

10 February 2026 11 (Rescheduled)	Tanjong Pagar United (Singapore)	1–5	(Singapore) Young Lions	Jurong East
	Darius Lai 30'; Haziq Zulkifli (yellow card) 67'; Fathullah Rahmat (yellow card) 82'		Caelan Cheong 21'; Harith Danish Irwan 56', 69'; Nicolas Beninger 61'; Zaki Jumlan 88'	Stadium: Jurong East Stadium; Referee: Faris Abdul Rahman

13 January 2026 12	Geylang International (Singapore)	3–1	(Singapore) Tanjong Pagar United	Tampines
	Prince Rio Rifae'i 19', 26'; Timothy Cheng 52'; Danial Scott Crichton (yellow card) 31'; Danie Hafiy (yellow card) 42'; Shakir Hamzah (yellow card) 45'; Faisal Shahril (yellow card) 75'		Naqiuddin Eunos 75'	Stadium: Our Tampines Hub; Referee: Noor Adzdzeeq

20 January 2026 13	Tanjong Pagar United (Singapore)	0–3; Awarded (Note: The match, originally won by Tanjong Pagar 2–0, was forfeited by Tanjong Pagar and awarded 3–0 to Balestier Khalsa, as Tanjong Pagar fielded less than 4 U23 Singaporeans)	(Singapore) Balestier Khalsa	Jurong East
	Syabil Hisham 27' (o.g.); Sahil Suhaimi 45'; Shodai Nishikawa (yellow card) 34' (yellow-red card); Samuel Pillai (yellow card) 36'; Azim Akbar (yellow card) 52'		Syabil Hisham (yellow card) 62'; Fudhil I'yadh (yellow card) 85' (yellow-red card); Ifat Sha'aban (yellow card) 90+1'	Stadium: Jurong East Stadium; Referee: Mazlan Pagira

27 January 2026 14	Hougang United (Singapore)	0–2	(Singapore) Tanjong Pagar United	Jurong East
	Matin Manaf (yellow card) 13'; Nasrul Pujiyono (yellow card) 35'; Algirdas Karlonas (yellow card) 45'; G. Jeeva (yellow card) 85'; Khilfi Aniq (yellow card) 90'		Sahil Suhaimi 2', 28'; Guilherme Rodrigues (yellow card) 75'	Stadium: Jurong East Stadium; Referee: Yazid Abdul Latiff

3 February 2026 15	Lion City Sailors (Singapore)	2–3	(Singapore) Tanjong Pagar United	Bishan
	Adam Faisal 32'; Aiman Zayani 82' (yellow card) 75'		Naqiuddin Eunos 17', 36'; Faisal Roslan 90'; Haziq Zulkifli (yellow card) 65'	Stadium: Bishan Stadium; Referee: Taufik Thana

24 February 2026 16	Tanjong Pagar United (Singapore)	0–2	(Japan) Albirex Niigata (S)	Jurong East
	Aiqel Aliman (yellow card) 63'; Syahadat Masnawi (yellow card) 70'; Azim Akbar (yellow card) 75'		Helmi Shahrol 48'; Liska Iskandar 88' (yellow card) 90'; Nicky Melvin Singh (yellow card) 34'; Sim Jun Yen (yellow card) 38'; Daniel Martens (yellow card) 65'	Stadium: Jurong East Stadium; Referee: Thawfeek Ahamad

17 March 2026 17	BG Tampines Rovers (Singapore)	2–0	(Singapore) Tanjong Pagar United	Tampines
	Zikos Chua 60'; Jasper Chen 85'; Sky Yeo (yellow card) 28'		Anaqi Ismit (yellow card) 72'; Aloysius Pang (yellow card) 78'; Kenji Syed Rusydi (yellow card) 88'	Stadium: Our Tampines Hub; Referee: Hilmi Fuad

31 March 2026 18	Young Lions (Singapore)	2–2	(Singapore) Tanjong Pagar United	Jurong East
	Uchenna Eziakor 29'; Kai Sheng Loo 54'; Ajay Robson (yellow card) 60'		Junior Djile 75'; Anaqi Ismit 86'; Fathullah Rahmat (yellow card) 15'; Aiqel Aliman (yellow card) 78'; Faizal Roslan (yellow card) 82'	Stadium: Jurong East Stadium; Referee: Yazid Abdul Latiff

7 April 2026 19	Tanjong Pagar United (Singapore)	1–1	(Singapore) Geylang International	Jalan Besar
	Anaqi Ismit 56'; Samuel Pillai (yellow card) 50'; Aiqel Aliman (yellow card) 73'; Danny Ali (yellow card) 90'		Abdusukur Abduryim 85'; Kyan Neo (yellow card) 25'; Faisal Shahril (yellow card) 48'; Ryu Hardy (yellow card) 89'	Stadium: Jalan Besar Stadium; Referee: Muhammad Noor Adzdzeeq

14 April 2026 20	Balestier Khalsa (Singapore)	1–1	(Singapore) Tanjong Pagar United	Bishan
	Hugh Alexander Lobsey 11' (yellow card) 45'; Dany Irfan (yellow card) 81'		Sahil Suhaimi 13'; Jesse Daley (yellow card) 41'; Samuel Pillai (yellow card) 90+1'	Stadium: Bishan Stadium

21 April 2026 21	Tanjong Pagar United (Singapore)	2–1	(Singapore) Hougang United	Jurong East
	Azim Akbar 30'; Sahil Suhaimi 90' (yellow card) 42'; Naufal Ilham (yellow card) 21'; Aloysius Pang (yellow card) 88'		Ganesan Silloren 45'; Algirdas Karlonas (yellow card) 62'	Stadium: Jurong East Stadium; Referee: Syarqawi Buhari

Pos	Team	Pld	W	D	L	GF	GA	GD	Pts	Qualification or relegation
1	Albirex Niigata (S) II	21	14	1	6	50	23	+27	43	Inaugural Champion
2	Young Lions B	21	13	1	7	52	31	+21	40	
3	BG Tampines Rovers II	21	12	2	7	46	30	+16	38	
4	Geylang International II	21	9	4	8	36	38	−2	31	
5	Tanjong Pagar United II	21	9	3	9	34	43	−9	30	
6	Lion City Sailors II	21	7	2	12	35	41	−6	23	
7	Hougang United II	21	5	4	12	28	43	−15	19	
8	Balestier Khalsa II	21	5	3	13	25	57	−32	18	

First match(es) will be played: 7 May 2026. Source: Singapore Premier League
Rules for classification: 1) points; 2) goal difference; 3) number of goals scored; 4) number of wins
