= 2021–22 in Australian soccer =

53rd season of national competitive soccer in Australia

Soccer in Australia
- Season: 2021–22

Men's soccer
- ALM Premiership: Melbourne City
- ALM Championship: Western United
- National Premier Leagues: Finals not held
- FFA Cup: Melbourne Victory

Women's soccer
- ALW Premiership: Sydney FC
- ALW Championship: Melbourne Victory

The 2021–22 season was the 53rd season of national competitive Soccer in Australia and 139th overall.

== National teams ==
=== Men's senior ===
==== Friendly ====
The following is a list of friendlies played by the men's senior national team in 2021–22.

1 June 2022	Australia	2–1	Jordan	Doha, Qatar
21:00 UTC+3	Wright 40'; Mabil 68'	Report	Al-Taamari 17'	Stadium: Al Janoub Stadium; Attendance: 0 (behind closed doors); Referee: Saad Kamil Al-Fadhli (Kuwait)

==== FIFA World Cup qualification ====
===== AFC third round Group B =====
2 September 2021 Group B	Australia	3–0	China	Doha, Qatar
21:00 UTC+3	Mabil 24'; Boyle 26'; Duke 70'	Report		Stadium: Suheim bin Hamad Stadium; Attendance: 0 (behind closed doors); Referee: Ko Hyung-jin (South Korea)

7 September 2021 Group B	Vietnam	0–1	Australia	Hanoi, Vietnam
19:00 UTC+7		Report	Grant 43'	Stadium: Mỹ Đình National Stadium; Attendance: 0 (behind closed doors); Referee: Abdulrahman Al-Jassim (Qatar)

7 October 2021 Group B	Australia	3–1	Oman	Doha, Qatar
21:30 UTC+3	Mabil 9'; Boyle 49'; Duke 89'	Report	Al-Alawi 28'	Stadium: Khalifa International Stadium; Attendance: 0 (behind closed doors); Referee: Nawaf Shukralla (Bahrain)

12 October 2021 Group B	Japan	2–1	Australia	Saitama, Japan
19:14 UTC+9	Tanaka 8'; Behich 85' (o.g.)	Report	Hrustic 70'	Stadium: Saitama Stadium 2002; Attendance: 14,437; Referee: Abdulrahman Al-Jassim (Qatar)

11 November 2021 Group B	Australia	0–0	Saudi Arabia	Sydney, Australia
20:05 UTC+11		Report		Stadium: Western Sydney Stadium; Attendance: 23,314; Referee: Ko Hyung-jin (South Korea)

16 November 2021 Group B	China	1–1	Australia	Sharjah, United Arab Emirates
19:00 UTC+4	Wu Lei 71' (pen.)	Report	Duke 38'	Stadium: Sharjah Stadium; Attendance: 1,050; Referee: Adham Makhadmeh (Jordan)

27 January 2022 Group B	Australia	4–0	Vietnam	Melbourne, Australia
20:10 UTC+11	Maclaren 30'; Rogic 45+2'; Goodwin 72'; McGree 77'	Report		Stadium: Melbourne Rectangular Stadium; Attendance: 27,740; Referee: Ko Hyung-jin (South Korea)

1 February 2022 Group B	Oman	2–2	Australia	Muscat, Oman
20:00 UTC+4	Fawaz 54', 89' (pen.)	Report	Maclaren 15' (pen.); Mooy 79'	Stadium: Sultan Qaboos Sports Complex; Attendance: 0 Referee: Mohammed Abdulla Hassan Mohamed (United Arab Emirates)

24 March 2022 Group B	Australia	0–2	Japan	Sydney, Australia
20:10 UTC+11		Report	Mitoma 89', 90+3'	Stadium: Stadium Australia; Attendance: 41,852; Referee: Nawaf Shukralla (Bahrain)

29 March 2022 Group B	Saudi Arabia	1–0	Australia	Jeddah, Saudi Arabia
21:00 UTC+3	Al-Dawsari 65' (pen.)	Report		Stadium: King Abdullah Sports City; Referee: Adham Makhadmeh (Jordan)

===== AFC Fourth-round play-off =====
7 June 2022	United Arab Emirates	1–2	Australia	Al Rayyan, Qatar
21:00 UTC+3	Caio 57'	Report	Irvine 53'; Hrustic 84'	Stadium: Ahmad bin Ali Stadium; Referee: Ilgiz Tantashev (Uzbekistan)

===== Inter-Confederation play-offs =====
13 June 2022	Australia	0–0 (a.e.t.) (5–4 p)	Peru	Al Rayyan, Qatar
21:00 UTC+3		Report		Stadium: Ahmad bin Ali Stadium; Referee: Slavko Vinčić (Slovenia)
	Penalties
	Boyle (penalty missed); Mooy (penalty scored); Goodwin (penalty scored); Hrustic (penalty scored); Maclaren (penalty scored); Mabil (penalty scored)		(penalty scored) Lapadula; (penalty scored) Callens; (penalty missed) Advíncula; (penalty scored) Tapia; (penalty scored) Flores; (penalty missed) Valera

=== Men's under 23 ===
==== Friendlies ====
The following is a list of friendlies played by the men's under 23 national team in 2021–22.

12 July 2021	Australia	0–2	New Zealand	Ichihara, Japan
19:00 (UTC+9)		Report	Wood 55' (pen.); Just 83'	Stadium: ZA Oripri Stadium

15 July 2021	Australia	1–0	New Zealand	Ichihara, Japan
18:00 (UTC+9)	Duke 3'	Report		Stadium: ZA Oripri Stadium; Attendance: 0 (behind closed doors)

==== Olympic Games ====
22 July 2021 Group Stage	Argentina	0–2	Australia	Sapporo, Japan
19:30 UTC+9		Report	Wales 14'; Tilio 80'	Stadium: Sapporo Dome; Attendance: 0 Referee: Srđan Jovanović (Serbia)

25 July 2021 Group Stage	Australia	0–1	Spain	Sapporo, Japan
19:30 UTC+9		Report	Oyarzabal 81'	Stadium: Sapporo Dome; Attendance: 0 Referee: Bamlak Tessema Weyesa (Ethiopia)

28 July 2021 Group Stage	Australia	0–2	Egypt	Rifu, Japan
20:00 UTC+9		Report	Rayyan 44'; A. Hamdy 85'	Stadium: Miyagi Stadium; Attendance: 0 Referee: Artur Soares Dias (Portugal)

==== AFC U-23 Asian Cup qualification ====
26 October 2021 Group Stage	Indonesia	2–3	Australia	Dushanbe, Tajikistan
17:00 UTC+5	Witan 68'; Taufik 84'	Report	Tokich 53'; Wood 59'; Italiano 77'	Stadium: Republican Central Stadium; Attendance: 0 Referee: Kim Woo-sung (South Korea)

29 October 2021 Group Stage	Australia	1–0	Indonesia	Dushanbe, Tajikistan
17:00 UTC+5	Wood 10'	Report		Stadium: Republican Central Stadium; Attendance: 0 Referee: Mohd Arif Shamil Abd Rasid (Malaysia)

==== AFC U-23 Asian Cup ====
1 June 2022 Group stage	Australia	2–0	Kuwait	Qarshi, Uzbekistan
18:00 (UTC+5)	D'Arrigo 26'; Rich-Baghuelou 54'	Report		Stadium: Markaziy Stadium; Referee: Adel Al-Naqbi (United Arab Emirates)

4 June 2022 Group stage	Iraq	1–1	Australia	Qarshi, Uzbekistan
18:00 (UTC+5)	Abdulkareem 56'	Report	Kuol 45+2'	Stadium: Markaziy Stadium; Attendance: 492; Referee: Akhrol Riskullaev (Uzbekistan)

7 June 2022 Group stage	Jordan	0–1	Australia	Tashkent, Uzbekistan
18:00 (UTC+5)	Najjarine 61' (pen.)	Report		Stadium: Lokomotiv Stadium; Referee: Yudai Yamamoto (Japan)

11 June 2022 Quarter-final	Australia	1–0	Turkmenistan	Tashkent, Uzbekistan
18:00 (UTC+5)	Orazow 74' (o.g.)	Report		Stadium: Milliy Stadium; Attendance: 247; Referee: Salman Ahmad Falahi (Qatar)

15 June 2022 Semi-final	Australia	0−2	Saudi Arabia	Tashkent, Uzbekistan
18:00 (UTC+5)	Al-Eisa 20'; Yahya 72'	Report		Stadium: Pakhtakor Stadium; Attendance: 323; Referee: Mohanad Qasim Sarray (Iraq)

18 June 2022 3rd place match	Japan	3–0	Australia	Tashkent, Uzbekistan
18:00 (UTC+5)	Sato 7'; Trewin 39' (o.g.); Fujio 63'	Report		Stadium: Pakhtakor Stadium; Attendance: 230; Referee: Kim Hee-gon (South Korea)

=== Women's senior ===
==== Friendlies ====
The following is a list of friendlies played by the women's national team in 2021–22.

14 July 2021 MS&AD Cup	Japan	1–0	Australia	Kameoka, Japan
19:20 UTC+9	Iwabuchi 54' (pen.)	Report		Stadium: Sanga Stadium; Referee: Azusa Sugino (Japan)

21 September 2021	Republic of Ireland	3–2	Australia	Dublin, Republic of Ireland
19:00	Lu. Quinn 3'; O'Sullivan 23'; Lo. Quinn 49'	Report	Fowler 14', 45+1'	Stadium: Tallaght Stadium; Referee: Paula Brady (Republic of Ireland)

23 October 2022	Australia	3–1	Brazil	Sydney, Australia
19:50	Polkinghorne 38'; Fowler 66'; van Egmond 80'	Report	Adriana 68'	Stadium: CommBank Stadium; Attendance: 15,270; Referee: Esther Staubli (Switzerland)

26 October 2022	Australia	2–2	Brazil	Sydney, Australia
20:05	Polkinghorne 10'; Kerr 53'	Report	Érika 64'; Debinha 72'	Stadium: CommBank Stadium; Attendance: 12,087; Referee: Désirée Grundbacher (Switzerland)

27 November 2021	Australia	0–3	United States	Sydney, Australia
15:00		Source	Hatch 1'; Lavelle 49'; Horan 68' (pen.)	Stadium: ANZ Stadium; Attendance: 36,109; Referee: Hyeon Jeong Oh (South Korea)

30 November 2021	Australia	1–1	United States	Newcastle, Australia
20:05	Simon 88'	Report	Hatch 4'	Stadium: McDonald Jones Stadium; Attendance: 20,495; Referee: Park Sejin (South Korea)

8 April 2022	Australia	2–1	New Zealand	Townsville, Australia
19:45 10:00	van Egmond 90+3'; Kerr 90+5'	Report	Green 32'	Stadium: QCB Stadium; Attendance: 10,779; Referee: Asaka Koizumi (Japan)

12 April 2022	Australia	3–1	New Zealand	Canberra, Australia
19:45 10:00	Kerr 15', 32'; Raso 17'	Report	Wilkinson 45+3'	Stadium: GIO Stadium; Attendance: 13,077; Referee: Haruna Kanematsu (Japan)

25 June 2022	Spain	7–0	Australia	Huelva, Spain
21:30 UTC+1	Bonmatí 44'; Mariona 48'; González 53'; García 57', 81'; Guerrero 89', 90+1'	Report		Stadium: Estadio Nuevo Colombino; Attendance: 6,869; Referee: Monika Mularczyk (Poland)

28 June 2022	Portugal	1–1	Australia	Estoril, Portugal
21:00 UTC+1	Encarnação 87'	Report	Ibini 73'	Stadium: Estádio António Coimbra da Mota; Referee: Victoria Beyer (France)

==== Olympic Games ====
21 July 2021 Group Stage	Australia	2–1	New Zealand	Tokyo, Japan
20:30	Yallop 20'; Kerr 33'	Report	Rennie 90+1'	Stadium: Tokyo Stadium; Attendance: 0 Referee: Lucila Venegas (Mexico)

24 July 2021 Group Stage	Sweden	4–2	Australia	Saitama, Japan
17:30	Rolfö 20', 63'; Hurtig 52'; Blackstenius 82'	Report	Kerr 36', 48'	Stadium: Saitama Stadium 2002; Attendance: 0 Referee: Edina Alves Batista (Brazil)

27 July 2021 Group Stage	United States	0–0	Australia	Kashima, Japan
17:00		Report		Stadium: Kashima Soccer Stadium; Attendance: 0 Referee: Anastasia Pustovoitova (Russia)

30 July 2021 Quarter-finals	Great Britain	3–4	Australia	Kashima, Japan
18:00	White 57', 66', 115'	Report	Kennedy 35'; Kerr 89', 106'; Fowler 103'	Stadium: Kashima Soccer Stadium; Attendance: 0 Referee: Salima Mukansanga (Rwanda)

2 August 2021 Semi-finals	Australia	0–1	Sweden	Yokohama, Japan
20:00		Report	Rolfö 46'	Stadium: International Stadium Yokohama; Attendance: 0 Referee: Melissa Borjas (Honduras)

5 August 2021 Bronze medal match	Australia	3–4	United States	Kashima, Japan
17:00	Kerr 17'; Foord 54'; Gielnik 90'	Report	Rapinoe 8', 21'; Lloyd 45+1', 51'	Stadium: Kashima Soccer Stadium; Attendance: 0 Referee: Laura Fortunato (Argentina)

==== AFC Women's Asian Cup ====
21 January 2022 Group stage	Australia	18–0	Indonesia	Mumbai, India
15:30 UTC+5:30	Kerr 9', 11', 26' (pen.), 36', 54'; Foord 14'; Fowler 17'; Raso 24', 88'; Carpenter 34', 49'; Van Egmond 39' (pen.), 57', 69'; Yallop 59'; Simon 68', 71'; Luik 79'	Report		Stadium: Mumbai Football Arena; Referee: Mahsa Ghorbani (Iran)

24 January 2022 Group stage	Philippines	0–4	Australia	Mumbai, India
15:30 UTC+5:30		Report	Kerr 51'; Randle 53' (o.g.); van Egmond 67'; Fowler 87'	Stadium: Mumbai Football Arena; Referee: Wang Chieh (Chinese Taipei)

27 January 2022 Group stage	Australia	2–1	Thailand	Mumbai, India
19:30 UTC+5:30	van Egmond 39'; Kerr 80'	Report	Nipawan 90+3'	Stadium: Mumbai Football Arena; Referee: Thein Thein Aye (Myanmar)

30 January 2022 Quarter-final	Australia	0–1	South Korea	Pune, India
--:-- UTC+5:30		Report	Ji So-yun 87'	Stadium: Shiv Chhatrapati Sports Complex; Referee: Qin Liang (China PR)

=== Women's under-20 ===
Australia was to host one of the groups in the first round of qualification for the 2022 AFC U-20 Women's Asian Cup, between 14 and 22 August 2021 in Shepparton, Victoria. However, in July 2021, the Asian Football Confederation confirmed that the competition was cancelled due to the COVID-19 pandemic.

==== Friendlies ====
The following is a list of friendlies played by the Women's U-20 team in 2021–22.

6 April 2022	Australia	5–1	New Zealand	Canberra, Australia
18:30 UTC+10	Dos Santos 2'; Hunter 21' (pen.); Galic 39'; Johnson 55' (pen.); Gallagher 57'	Report	Lancaster 44'	Stadium: Deakin Stadium; Referee: Anna-Marie Keighley (New Zealand)

10 April 2022	Australia	1–1	New Zealand	Canberra, Australia
14:00 UTC+10	Hunter 10'	Report	Clegg 38'	Stadium: Viking Stadium; Referee: Georgia Ghirardello (Australia)

12 June 2022	New Zealand	2–1	Australia	Auckland, New Zealand
14:00 UTC+12	Dugan 53'; Taylor 79' (pen.)	Report	Galic 2'	Stadium: Kiwitea Street

=== Women's under-17 ===
Australia was to host one of the groups in the first round of qualification for the 2022 AFC U-17 Women's Asian Cup, between 18 and 26 September 2021 in Cessnock, New South Wales. However, in July 2021, the Asian Football Confederation confirmed that the competition was cancelled due to the COVID-19 pandemic.

== AFC competitions ==
=== AFC Champions League ===
Qualifiers:

- Melbourne City as 2020–21 A-League regular season premiers
- Melbourne Victory as 2021 FFA Cup winners
- Sydney FC as 2020–21 A-League regular season runners-up

Melbourne Victory were eliminated in the play-off round.

==== Group stage ====
===== Group G =====
Pos	Team	Pld	W	D	L	GF	GA	GD	Pts	Qualification	BGP	MCY	JND	UCT
1	(Thailand) BG Pathum United (H)	6	3	3	0	11	2	+9	12	Advance to Round of 16	—	1–1	0–0	5–0
2	(Australia) Melbourne City	6	3	3	0	10	3	+7	12		0–0	—	2–1	3–0
3	(South Korea) Jeonnam Dragons	6	2	2	2	5	5	0	8		0–2	1–1	—	2–0
4	(Philippines) United City	6	0	0	6	1	17	−16	0		1–3	0–3	0–1	—

Source: AFC
(H) Hosts

===== Group H =====
Pos	Team	Pld	W	D	L	GF	GA	GD	Pts	Qualification	YFM	JBH	HOA	SYD
1	(Japan) Yokohama F. Marinos	6	4	1	1	9	3	+6	13	Advance to Round of 16	—	0–1	2–0	3–0
2	(South Korea) Jeonbuk Hyundai Motors	6	3	3	0	7	4	+3	12	Advance to Round of 16	1–1	—	1–0	0–0
3	(Vietnam) Hoang Anh Gia Lai (H)	6	1	2	3	4	7	−3	5		1–2	1–1	—	1–0
4	(Australia) Sydney FC	6	0	2	4	3	9	−6	2		0–1	2–3	1–1	—

Source: AFC
(H) Hosts

== Men's football ==
=== A-League Men ===
Pos	Team	Pld	W	D	L	GF	GA	GD	Pts	Qualification
1	Melbourne City	26	14	7	5	55	33	+22	49	Qualification for finals series and 2023–24 AFC Champions League group stage (Note: Determined by which of the Premiers for the 2021–22 or 2022–23 seasons accrued the most combined points over both seasons. Melbourne City qualified as they were Premiers in both seasons.)
2	Melbourne Victory	26	13	9	4	42	25	+17	48	Qualification for finals series (Note: The top two teams enter the finals series at the semi-finals, while the teams ranked third to sixth enter the finals series at the elimination-finals.)
3	Western United (C)	26	13	6	7	40	30	+10	45	Qualification for finals series
4	Adelaide United	26	12	7	7	38	31	+7	43	Qualification for finals series
5	Central Coast Mariners	26	12	6	8	49	35	+14	42	Qualification for finals series
6	Wellington Phoenix (Note: Wellington Phoenix cannot qualify for Asian Football Confederation competitions as they are based in New Zealand, which is under the Oceania Football Confederation.)	26	12	3	11	34	49	−15	39	Qualification for finals series
7	Macarthur FC	26	9	6	11	38	47	−9	33	
8	Sydney FC	26	8	7	11	37	44	−7	31	
9	Newcastle Jets	26	8	5	13	45	43	+2	29	Qualification for 2022 Australia Cup play-offs (Note: The top 8 teams qualify for the round of 32, while the bottom four teams participate in a play-off round.)
10	Western Sydney Wanderers	26	6	9	11	30	38	−8	27	Qualification for 2022 Australia Cup play-offs
11	Brisbane Roar	26	7	5	14	29	39	−10	26	Qualification for 2022 Australia Cup play-offs
12	Perth Glory	26	4	6	16	20	43	−23	18	Qualification for 2022 Australia Cup play-offs

Source: A-Leagues
Rules for classification: 1) Points; 2) Goal difference; 3) Goals scored; 4) Points per game; 5) Least red cards; 6) Least yellow cards; 7) Toss of a coin in an event of a tie of two clubs.
(C) Champions
Notes:

Finals

Elimination-finals
4	Adelaide United	3
5	Central Coast Mariners	1
3	Western United	1
6	Wellington Phoenix	0

Semi-finals
4	Adelaide United	0	1	1
1	Melbourne City (a.e.t.)	0	2	2
3	Western United	0	4	4
2	Melbourne Victory	1	1	2

Grand Final
1	Melbourne City	0
3	Western United	2

=== National Premier Leagues ===
The Final Series was not held.

=== Cup competitions ===
==== FFA Cup ====
Round of 32
ECU Joondalup	0
Adelaide Olympic	3
Floreat Athena	1
Adelaide United (a.e.t.)	3
Edge Hill United	0
Gold Coast Knights	2
Adelaide City	0
Melbourne Victory	1
Hume City	3
Port Melbourne	1
South Melbourne	0
Melbourne City	3
Avondale FC (w/o)
Devonport City
Western United	0
Wellington Phoenix	1
Sydney Olympic	2
Sydney FC	4
Newcastle Olympic	0
Macarthur FC	3
Lions FC	6
Casuarina FC	0
Peninsula Power	0
Brisbane Roar	3
Tigers FC	0
APIA Leichhardt (a.e.t.)	3
Broadmeadow Magic	0
Western Sydney Wanderers	3
Mt Druitt Town Rangers	0
Wollongong Wolves	3
Blacktown City	0
Central Coast Mariners	1

Round of 16
Adelaide Olympic	0
Adelaide United	1
Gold Coast Knights	1
Melbourne Victory (a.e.t.)	2
Hume City	0
Melbourne City	1
Avondale FC	1
Wellington Phoenix	4
Sydney FC (a.e.t.)	2
Macarthur FC	0
Lions FC	0
Brisbane Roar	4
APIA Leichhardt	2
Western Sydney Wanderers	1
Wollongong Wolves	1
Central Coast Mariners	2

Quarter-finals
Adelaide United	1
Melbourne Victory	2
Melbourne City	0 (3)
Wellington Phoenix (p)	0 (4)
Sydney FC	1
Brisbane Roar	0
APIA Leichhardt	0
Central Coast Mariners	6

Semi-finals
Melbourne Victory	4
Wellington Phoenix	1
Sydney FC	0
Central Coast Mariners	1

Final
Melbourne Victory	2
Central Coast Mariners	1

==== A-Leagues All Stars Game ====
25 May 2022
20:05 AEST

A-Leagues All Stars (Australia) (New Zealand)	2–3	(Spain) Barcelona
Piscopo 47'; Traoré 53'	Report	Dembélé 34'; Traoré 72'; Fati 77'

Accor Stadium, Sydney
Attendance: 70,174
Referee: Alex King (Australia)

== Women's football ==
=== A-League Women ===
Pos	Team	Pld	W	D	L	GF	GA	GD	Pts	Qualification
1	Sydney FC	14	11	2	1	36	6	+30	35	Qualification to Finals series
2	Melbourne City	14	11	0	3	29	11	+18	33	Qualification to Finals series
3	Adelaide United	14	9	0	5	33	18	+15	27	Qualification to Finals series
4	Melbourne Victory (C)	14	7	3	4	26	22	+4	24	Qualification to Finals series
5	Perth Glory	14	7	3	4	20	23	−3	24	
6	Brisbane Roar	14	5	2	7	29	30	−1	17	
7	Canberra United	14	2	7	5	24	29	−5	13	
8	Newcastle Jets	14	2	4	8	15	30	−15	10	
9	Western Sydney Wanderers	14	1	4	9	7	27	−20	7	
10	Wellington Phoenix	14	2	1	11	13	36	−23	7	

Source: A-Leagues
Rules for classification: 1) points; 2) goal difference; 3) number of goals scored.
(C) Champions

Finals

Semi-finals
1	Sydney FC (a.e.t.)	4
2	Melbourne City	2
3	Adelaide United	1
4	Melbourne Victory	2

Preliminary Final
2	Melbourne City	1
4	Melbourne Victory	3

Grand Final
1	Sydney FC	1
4	Melbourne Victory	2

== Deaths ==
- 3 January 2022: Ulysses Kokkinos, 74, former South Melbourne Hellas, Fitzroy United, Hakoah Eastern Suburbs, Melbourne Juventus, West Adelaide Hellas, Western Suburbs, and Floreat Athena forward.
- 23 February 2022: Jim Milisavljevic, 70, former Footscray JUST and Carlton Serbia goalkeeper.
- 14 March 2022: Colin Kitching, 88, former Bundamba, Blackstone United, St Helens United, Hellenic, and Australia forward.

== Retirements ==
- 14 September 2021: Wayne Brown, 33, former Newcastle Jets midfielder.
- 19 September 2021: Christine Nairn, 30, former United States and Melbourne Victory midfielder.
- 24 September 2021: Lisa De Vanna, 36, former Australia, Adelaide Sensation, Western Waves, Perth Glory, Brisbane Roar, Newcastle Jets, Melbourne Victory, Melbourne City, North Shore Mariners, Canberra United, South Melbourne, and Sydney FC forward.
- 28 September 2021: Steven Taylor, 35, former Wellington Phoenix defender.
- 30 September 2021: Ronald Vargas, 34, former Venezuela and Newcastle Jets forward.
- 15 October 2021: Simon Cox, 34, former Ireland and Western Sydney Wanderers forward.
- 23 October 2021: Adam Federici, 36, former Australia and Macarthur FC goalkeeper.
- 28 October 2021: Daniel Georgievski, 33, former Macedonia, Melbourne Victory, Newcastle Jets, Western Sydney Wanderers, and Melbourne City defender.
- 12 November 2021: Joe Ledley, 34, former Wales and Newcastle Jets midfielder.
- 27 January 2022: Besart Berisha, 36, former Albania, Kosovo, Brisbane Roar, Melbourne Victory, and Western United forward.
- 9 March 2022: Zac Anderson, 30, former Gold Coast United, Central Coast Mariners, Sydney FC, and Olympic FC defender.
- 30 April 2022: Andy Keogh, 35, former Republic of Ireland and Perth Glory forward.
- 7 May 2022: Bobô, 37, former Sydney FC forward.
- 20 May 2022: Louis Fenton, 29, former New Zealand and Wellington Phoenix defender.
- 22 May 2022: Joseph Mills, 32, former Perth Glory defender.

== Comebacks ==
- 23 November 2021: Ashleigh Sykes, 28, former Australia international forward who retired in 2018 and signed with Canberra United.
- 25 November 2021: Lisa De Vanna, 36, former Australia international forward who retired in September 2021 and signed with Perth Glory.
