= Jesse Daley =

Australian soccer player (born 1997)

Personal information
- Date of birth: 16 October 1997 (age 29)
- Place of birth: Brisbane, Australia
- Height: 1.78 m (5 ft 10 in)
- Position: Central midfielder

Team information
- Current team: South Island United
- Number: 8

Youth career
- Queensland Lions FC
- Queensland Academy of Sport
- 2013–2015: Brisbane Roar
- 2015: Melbourne Victory

Senior career*
Years	Team	Apps	(Gls)
2014–2015	Brisbane Roar NPL	10	(1)
2015	Melbourne Victory NPL	10	(0)
2016	Brisbane Roar NPL	15	(4)
2017	South Melbourne	22	(1)
2018	Queensland Lions FC	4	(4)
2018–2020	Tacoma Defiance (Note: Seattle Sounders 2 changed its name to Tacoma Defiance in 2019)	50	(5)
2020–2022	Brisbane Roar	47	(0)
2023–2025	Cavalry FC	45	(0)
2025–2026	Tanjong Pagar United	2	(0)
2027–	South Island United	0	(0)

International career^{‡}
2015	Australia U20	1	(0)
- * Club domestic league appearances and goals as of November 12, 2026 ‡ National team caps and goals as of 17 August 2020

Jesse Daley (born 16 October 1997) is an Australian professional soccer player who plays as a central midfielder for OFC Professional League club South Island United.

== Early life ==
Daley began playing football with Queensland Lions FC, later joining the Queensland Academy of Sport, followed by the Brisbane Roar FC Youth program in 2013. He also had a spell with the Melbourne Victory FC Youth team.

== Club career ==
In 2014, Daley made his senior debut, playing with the Brisbane Roar NPL side in the NPL Queensland. In May 2015, he secured a release from the club to join the Melbourne Victory NPL side in the NPL Victoria 1 to secure more playing experience. In 2016, he returned to the Brisbane NPL team, where he served as team captain, and also spent pre-season with the Brisbane Roar first team.

In December 2016, ahead of the 2017 season, he signed with South Melbourne FC of the NPL Victoria for two years. During the summer of 2017, he had a trial with A-League side Perth Glory FC, before returning to South Melbourne.

In 2018, he joined Queensland Lions FC in the NPL Queensland, where he played six matches before departing.

In May 2018, he joined Seattle Sounders FC 2 (later renamed Tacoma Defiance in 2019) in the USL Championship. He made his debut on 12 May 2018 against Portland Timbers 2, in a substitute appearance. He recorded his first assist in his next appearance on May 19, against Reno 1868 FC. In August 2020, he was released by the club. Over his time with the club, he scored five goals and added five assists in fifty appearances.

In October 2020, he returned to Australia, joining the Brisbane Roar, his former youth club, in the A-League. In December 2022, he departed the club, after having made 54 appearances.

In December 2022, he signed a multi-year contract with Canadian Premier League club Cavalry FC, ahead of the 2023 season. He made his debut on 15 April 2023, coming on as a substitute against Forge FC. In Daley's first season with Cavalry FC they were crowned regular season winners, winning the first piece of silverware in the club's history. Subsequently Cavalry FC qualified for the 2024 CONCACAF Champions Cup. In January 2025, Daley would sign a one year contract extension with Cavalry, with a club option for the 2026 season. In June 2025, Daley departed Cavalry agreeing to terminate the remainder of his contract by mutual consent.

In July 2025, he signed with Singapore Premier League club Tanjong Pagar United.

In November 2026, Daley signed with New Zealand club South Island United in the OFC Professional League for the 2027 season.

== International career ==
In April 2015, Daley was called up to the Australia U20 team.

== Career statistics ==
As of November 14, 2026

Appearances and goals by club, season and competition
Club	Season	League			Playoffs		National cup		Continental		Other		Total	
Club	Season	Division	Apps	Goals	Apps	Goals	Apps	Goals	Apps	Goals	Apps	Goals	Apps	Goals
Brisbane Roar NPL	2014	NPL Queensland	4	0	—		—		—		—		4	0
Brisbane Roar NPL	2015	NPL Queensland	6	1	—		—		—		—		6	1
Brisbane Roar NPL	Total		10	1	0	0	0	0	0	0	0	0	10	1
Melbourne Victory NPL	2015	NPL Victoria 1	10	0	—		—		—		0	0	10	0
Brisbane Roar NPL	2016	NPL Queensland	15	4	—		—		—		—		15	4
South Melbourne FC	2017	NPL Victoria	22	1	1	0	8 (Note: Four appearances, four goals in the Dockerty Cup (FFA Cup preliminary rounds); four appearances, one goal in the 2017 FFA Cup proper)	5	—		1 (Note: Appearance in the FV Community Shield)	0	32	6
Queensland Lions FC	2018	NPL Queensland	4	4	0	0	?	?	—		—		4	4
Tacoma Defiance	2018	USL	22	2	—		—		—		—		22	2
Tacoma Defiance	2019	USL Championship	24	2	—		—		—		—		24	2
Tacoma Defiance	2020	USL Championship	4	1	—		—		—		—		4	1
Tacoma Defiance	Total		50	5	0	0	0	0	0	0	0	0	50	5
Brisbane Roar FC	2020–21	A-League Men	24	0	0	0	3	0	—		—		27	0
Brisbane Roar FC	2021–22	A-League Men	22	0	—		4	0	—		—		26	0
Brisbane Roar FC	2022–23	A-League Men	1	0	—		0	0	—		—		1	0
Brisbane Roar FC	Total		47	0	0	0	7	0	0	0	0	0	54	0
Cavalry FC	2023	Canadian Premier League	24	0	3	0	1	0	—		—		28	0
Cavalry FC	2024	Canadian Premier League	17	0	0	0	2	0	1	0	—		20	0
Cavalry FC	2025	Canadian Premier League	4	0	0	0	1	0	2	0	0	0	7	0
Cavalry FC	Total		45	0	3	0	4	0	3	0	0	0	55	0
Tanjong Pagar United	2025–26	Singapore Premier League	2	0	—		0	0	—		—		2	0
Career total			205	15	4	0	19	5	3	0	1	0	232	20
