= Ryo Wada =

Japanese footballer

Ryo Wada 和田 凌
Personal information
- Full name: Ryo Wada
- Date of birth: 5 July 1995 (age 31)
- Place of birth: Tochigi, Japan
- Height: 1.70 m (5 ft 7 in)
- Position: Forward

Youth career
- 2011–2013: JEF United Chiba
- 2014–2017: Hannan University

Senior career*
Years	Team	Apps	(Gls)
2018–2019	FC Ryukyu	30	(8)
2019–2021	Kagoshima United	2	(0)
2021–2023	Sagan Tosu	0	(0)
2022	→ Brisbane Roar (loan)	4	(0)
2022–2023	→ Reilac Shiga (loan)	17	(2)
2024	Hong Kong Rangers	0	(0)
- * Club domestic league appearances and goals as of 12 February 2024

Ryo Wada (和田 凌, Wada Ryō; born 5 July 1995) is a Japanese professional footballer who plays as a forward and is currently a free agent.

== Club career ==
Wada was born in Tochigi Prefecture on 5 July 1995. After graduating from Hannan University, he joined J3 League club FC Ryukyu in 2018.

Wada joined J1 League side Sagan Tosu in January 2021 after a trial, despite having made no appearances for Kagoshima United the previous season.

On 4 February 2022, Wada joined A-League club Brisbane Roar as a loan player. He took a month to gain enough match fitness to play, then only made 4 appearances.

On 24 January 2024, Wada joined Hong Kong Premier League club Rangers. However, he left the club only within a month on 12 February 2024.

== Career statistics ==
=== Club ===
Updated 13 September 2022.

Club performance			League		Cup		League Cup		Total	
Season	Club	League	Apps	Goals	Apps	Goals	Apps	Goals	Apps	Goals
Japan			League		Emperor's Cup		J.League Cup		Total	
2018	FC Ryukyu	J3 League	22	7	0	0	-		22	7
2019	FC Ryukyu	J2 League	8	1	1	0	-		9	1
2019	Kagoshima United	J2 League	2	0	0	0	-		2	0
2020	Kagoshima United	J3 League	0	0	0	0	-		0	0
2021	Sagan Tosu	J1 League	0	0	1	0	3	0	4	0
Australia			League		FFA Cup				Total	
2021–22	Brisbane Roar FC	A-League	4	0	0	0	0	0	4	0
Japan			League		Emperor's Cup		J.League Cup		Total	
2022	MIO Biwako Shiga	Japan Football League	3	0	-		-		3	0
