= Bruno Dybal =

Brazilian footballer (born 1994)

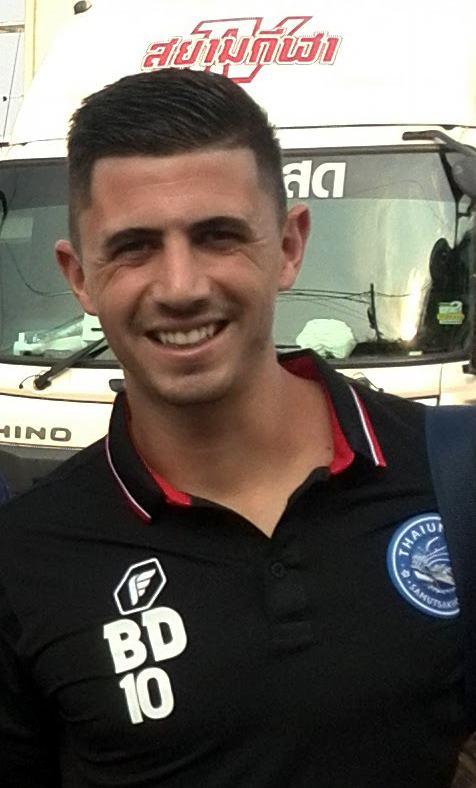

Personal information
- Full name: Bruno de Araújo Dybal
- Date of birth: 3 March 1994 (age 32)
- Place of birth: São Paulo, Brazil
- Height: 1.81 m (5 ft 11 in)
- Position: Attacking midfielder

Team information
- Current team: Tanjong Pagar United
- Number: 10

Youth career
- Portuguesa
- Palmeiras

Senior career*
Years	Team	Apps	(Gls)
2013–2016	Palmeiras	3	(0)
2014	→ Oeste (loan)	0	(0)
2015	→ Ventforet Kofu (loan)	1	(0)
2015–2016	→ Figueirense (loan)	11	(0)
2016–2018	Gil Vicente	21	(0)
2018	Sūduva	7	(0)
2019	Samut Sakhon City	33	(3)
2020	Persiraja Banda Aceh	3	(0)
2021	Masfout	26	(5)
2022	Persiraja Banda Aceh	14	(3)
2022–2023	Persikabo 1973	27	(3)
2023	Kuching City	6	(2)
2023–2024	Al-Karma		
2024	Maharlika Taguig		
2024	Semen Padang	10	(0)
2025–	Tanjong Pagar United	6	(3)
- * Club domestic league appearances and goals as of 31 January 2026

Bruno de Araújo Dybal (born 3 March 1994) is a Brazilian professional footballer who plays as an attacking midfielder for Singapore Premier League club Tanjong Pagar United.

== Club career ==
Born in São Paulo, Dybal joined Palmeiras youth setup in 2005, after starting it out at Portuguesa. He made his first team – and Série A – debut on 18 November 2012, coming on as late substitute for Mazinho in a 1–1 away draw against Flamengo. Dybal appeared in two further matches for Verdão, who suffered relegation. On 3 January 2014, after a year without a single appearance, he was loaned to Oeste until the end of the year.

Dybal moved to Ventforet Kofu on loan on 28 December 2014, after making no appearances for Oeste. After playing only one game, his loan was cut short due to injury. On 29 June 2015, Dybal was loaned to fellow top-tier club Figueirense, until February 2016.

On 6 January 2020, he joined Indonesian Liga 1 club, Persiraja Banda Aceh.

On 9 July 2025, he joined Singapore Premier League club Tanjong Pagar United.

== Personal life ==
Born in Brazil, Dybal is of Polish descent.

== Career statistics ==
As of 21 May 2016.

Statistics
Club	Season	League			National Cup (Note: Includes the Copa do Brasil)		League Cup (Note: Includes the J.League Cup)		Continental		Other (Note: Includes the Campeonato Catarinense, Campeonato Paulista and Primeira Liga)		Total	
Club	Season	Division	Apps	Goals	Apps	Goals	Apps	Goals	Apps	Goals	Apps	Goals	Apps	Goals
Palmeiras	2012	Série A	3	0	0	0	—		0	0	0	0	3	0
Palmeiras	2013	Série B	0	0	0	0	—		0	0	0	0	0	0
Palmeiras	2014	Série A	0	0	0	0	—		—		0	0	0	0
Palmeiras	2015	Série A	0	0	0	0	—		—		0	0	0	0
Palmeiras	2016	Série A	0	0	0	0	—		0	0	0	0	0	0
Palmeiras	Total		3	0	0	0	—		0	0	0	0	3	0
Palmeiras B	2012	Lower League	0	0	0	0	—		—		2 (Note: Two appearances in the 2012 Campeonato Paulista A2)	0	2	0
Palmeiras B	Total		0	0	0	0	—		—		2	0	2	0
Oeste (loan)	2014	Série B	0	0	0	0	—		—		0	0	0	0
Oeste (loan)	Total		0	0	0	0	—		—		0	0	2	0
Ventforet Kofu (loan)	2015	J1 League	1	0	0	0	1 (Note: One appearance in the 2015 J.League Cup)	0	—		—		2	0
Ventforet Kofu (loan)	Total		1	0	0	0	1	0	—		—		2	0
Figueirense (loan)	2015	Série A	3	0	1 (Note: One appearance in the 2015 Copa do Brasil)	0	—		—		0	0	4	0
Figueirense (loan)	2016	Série A	0	0	0	0	—		—		8 (Note: Six appearances in the 2016 Campeonato Catarinense, two appearances in 2016 Primeira Liga)	0	8	0
Figueirense (loan)	Total		3	0	1	0	—		—		8	0	12	0
Career total			7	0	1	0	1	0	0	0	10	0	19	0

== Honours ==
Palmeiras

- Campeonato Brasileiro Série B (1): 2013
