= 2021 FFA Cup =

2021 season of Australia's national knockout soccer competition

Tournament details
- Country: Australia; New Zealand
- Dates: 12 February 2021 – 5 February 2022
- Teams: 765 (qualifying competition); 32 (main competition)

Final positions
- Champions: Melbourne Victory (2nd title)
- Runners-up: Central Coast Mariners
- Champions League: Melbourne Victory

Tournament statistics
- Matches played: 30
- Goals scored: 87 (2.9 per match)
- Attendance: 71,343 (2,378 per match)
- Top goal scorer: Cyrus Dehmie (3 goals)

The 2021 FFA Cup was the eighth season of the FFA Cup (now known as the Australia Cup), the main national soccer knockout cup competition in Australia. Thirty-two teams contested the competition proper from the round of 32, including 10 of the 12 A-League teams (with two teams not qualifying), 21 Football Australia (FA) member federation teams determined through individual state qualifying rounds, as well as the 2019 National Premier Leagues champions (Wollongong Wolves from New South Wales).

This year's competition was the final season the competition is referred to as the "FFA Cup". Following the rebranding of Football Australia from the Football Federation Australia (FFA), it was changed to "Australia Cup".

This edition also marked the first season that the winner would qualify for the AFC Champions League in the following year. However, certain teams were excluded, such as Wellington Phoenix, (Note: Wellington Phoenix could not qualify for AFC competitions as they come from New Zealand, which is part of the Oceania Football Confederation) three other A-league teams (Note: Neither Adelaide United, Newcastle Jets nor Perth Glory were able to qualify as they were not granted an AFC licence for 2022 for either the AFC Champions League or the AFC Cup.) or any teams from the National Premier Leagues. (Note: Teams from the National Premier Leagues could not qualify as they were not granted an AFC licence for 2022 for either the AFC Champions League or the AFC Cup.)

The competition format and timing was impacted by the on-going COVID-19 pandemic in Australia.

== Round and dates ==
Round	Draw date	Match dates	Number of fixtures	Teams	New entries this round
Preliminary rounds	Various	12 February – 24 November 2021	733 + 60 byes	765 → 32	756
Round of 32	8 July 2021	14 September – 7 December 2021	16	32 → 16	9
Round of 16	North & West: 30 September 2021; South & East: 15 November 2021	17 October – 30 December 2021; 1–14 December 2021	8	16 → 8	None
Quarter-finals	5 December 2021	21 December 2021 – 12 January 2022	4	8 → 4	None
Semi-finals	6 January 2022	18–29 January 2022	2	4 → 2	None
Final	27 January 2022	5 February 2022	1	2 → 1	None

== Teams ==
A total of 32 teams are scheduled to participate in the 2021 FFA Cup competition proper, ten of which are from the A-League Men, one the 2019 National Premier Leagues champions (Wollongong Wolves), and the remaining 21 teams from member federations, as determined by the qualifying rounds.

A-League clubs represent the highest level in the Australian league system, whereas member federation clubs come from Level 2 and below. The current season tier of member federation clubs is shown in parentheses. For the first time, the round of 32 and round of 16 were split into four geographical zones (East, South, North and West) which were determined by Football Australia.

A-League clubs
East Zone	North Zone	South Zone	West Zone
Central Coast Mariners	Brisbane Roar	Melbourne City	Adelaide United
Macarthur FC		Wellington Phoenix	Melbourne Victory
Sydney FC		Western United	
Western Sydney Wanderers			
Member federation clubs
(New South Wales) APIA Leichhardt (2)	(Northern Territory) Casuarina FC (2)	(Victoria (state)) Avondale FC (2)	(South Australia) Adelaide City (2)
(New South Wales) Blacktown City (2)	(Queensland) Edge Hill United (5)	(Tasmania) Devonport City (2)	(South Australia) Adelaide Olympic (2)
(New South Wales) Broadmeadow Magic (2)	(Queensland) Gold Coast Knights (2)	(Victoria (state)) Hume City (2)	(Western Australia) ECU Joondalup (2)
(New South Wales) Mt Druitt Town Rangers (2)	(Queensland) Lions FC (2)	(Victoria (state)) Port Melbourne (2)	(Western Australia) Floreat Athena (2)
(New South Wales) Newcastle Olympic (2)	(Queensland) Peninsula Power (2)	(Victoria (state)) South Melbourne (2)	
(New South Wales) Sydney Olympic (2)			
(Australian Capital Territory) Tigers FC (2)
(New South Wales) Wollongong Wolves (2)

== Preliminary rounds ==
Member federations teams competed in various state-based preliminary rounds to win one of 21 places in the competition proper (round of 32). All Australian clubs (other than youth teams associated with A-League franchises) were eligible to enter the qualifying process through their respective member federation, however only one team per club was permitted entry in the competition. The preliminary rounds operated within a consistent national structure whereby club entry into the competition is staggered in each state/territory, ultimately leading to round 7 with the winning clubs from that round gaining direct entry into the round of 32.

There were changes to the make-up of the entrants compared to the 2019 edition, with South Australia increasing from 1 to 2 qualifying places, with NSW losing one place. Additionally, the top eight placed A-League clubs for the 2020–21 A-League season gained automatic qualification to the round of 32. The remaining four teams were subject to a play-off series for the remaining two positions.

The first matches of the preliminary rounds began in February 2021, with the final matches of the preliminary rounds (two A-League play-offs) completed in November.

Federation	Associated Competition	Round of 32 Qualifiers
Football Australia	A-League	10
Football Australia	National Premier Leagues	1
Capital Football (ACT)	Federation Cup (ACT)	1
Football NSW	Waratah Cup (Note: subsequently cancelled due to the COVID-19 pandemic.)	4
Northern NSW Football	—	2
Football Northern Territory	NT Australia Cup Final	1
Football Queensland	—	4
Football South Australia	Federation Cup (SA)	2
Football Tasmania	Milan Lakoseljac Cup	1
Football Victoria	Dockerty Cup	4
Football West (WA)	State Cup	2

== Bracket ==
Round of 32
ECU Joondalup	0
Adelaide Olympic	3
Floreat Athena	1
Adelaide United (a.e.t.)	3
Edge Hill United	0
Gold Coast Knights	2
Adelaide City	0
Melbourne Victory	1
Hume City	3
Port Melbourne	1
South Melbourne	0
Melbourne City	3
Avondale FC (w/o)
Devonport City
Western United	0
Wellington Phoenix	1
Sydney Olympic	2
Sydney FC	4
Newcastle Olympic	0
Macarthur FC	3
Lions FC	6
Casuarina FC	0
Peninsula Power	0
Brisbane Roar	3
Tigers FC	0
APIA Leichhardt (a.e.t.)	3
Broadmeadow Magic	0
Western Sydney Wanderers	3
Mt Druitt Town Rangers	0
Wollongong Wolves	3
Blacktown City	0
Central Coast Mariners	1

Round of 16
Adelaide Olympic	0
Adelaide United	1
Gold Coast Knights	1
Melbourne Victory (a.e.t.)	2
Hume City	0
Melbourne City	1
Avondale FC	1
Wellington Phoenix	4
Sydney FC (a.e.t.)	2
Macarthur FC	0
Lions FC	0
Brisbane Roar	4
APIA Leichhardt	2
Western Sydney Wanderers	1
Wollongong Wolves	1
Central Coast Mariners	2

Quarter-finals
Adelaide United	1
Melbourne Victory	2
Melbourne City	0 (3)
Wellington Phoenix (p)	0 (4)
Sydney FC	1
Brisbane Roar	0
APIA Leichhardt	0
Central Coast Mariners	6

Semi-finals
Melbourne Victory	4
Wellington Phoenix	1
Sydney FC	0
Central Coast Mariners	1

Final
Melbourne Victory	2
Central Coast Mariners	1

== Round of 32 ==
The round of 32 draw took place on 8 July 2021, with match information for zones North, South and West confirmed on 14 July 2021. Edge Hill United were the lowest-ranked side in this round. They were the only level 5 team left in the competition. After Devonport City withdrew from the competition, Avondale FC were awarded a bye to the round of 16.

Times are AEST/AEDT, (Note: AEST (UTC+10) (prior to 5 October 2021), or AEDT (UTC+11) (after 5 October 2021)) as listed by Football Australia (local times, if different, are in parentheses).

East Zone

6 November 2021	Mt Druitt Town Rangers (2)	0–3	Wollongong Wolves (2)	Popondetta Park, Sydney
19:00		Report	Simonoski 45+4'; Belkadi 47'; Scott 70'	Attendance: 714; Referee: Craig Fisher

10 November 2021	Broadmeadow Magic (2)	0–3	Western Sydney Wanderers (1)	No. 2 Sportsground, Newcastle
19:30		Report	Ibini 26'; Badolato 47'; Ugarkovic 51'	Attendance: 892; Referee: Hassan Jomaa

13 November 2021	Blacktown City (2)	0–1	Central Coast Mariners (1)	Glen Willow Sporting Field, Mudgee
17:00		Report	Nkololo 75'	Attendance: 1,046; Referee: Kurt Ams

13 November 2021	Newcastle Olympic (2)	0–3	Macarthur FC (1)	No. 2 Sportsground, Newcastle
18:00		Report	Jovanovic 39'; La. Rose 41', 61'	Attendance: 1,482; Referee: Ivica Covic

24 November 2021	Sydney Olympic (2)	2–4	Sydney FC (1)	Belmore Sports Ground, Sydney
19:30	Parkhouse 30'; McGing 82' (o.g.)	Report	Le Fondre 44'; Wood 59'; Kamsoba 78'; Buhagiar 90+2'	Attendance: 3,271; Referee: Ben Abraham

2 December 2021	Tigers FC (2)	0–3 (a.e.t.)	APIA Leichhardt (2)	Seiffert Oval, Queanbeyan
19:30		Report	Symons 113'; Romero 116'; Armson 120'	Attendance: 1,952; Referee: Nathan Shakespear

North Zone

14 September 2021	Peninsula Power (2)	0–3	Brisbane Roar (1)	Moreton Daily Stadium, Brisbane
19:30		Report	Steinmann 20'; Ivanovic 33'; Lescano 87'	Attendance: 2,905; Referee: Adam Kersey

15 September 2021	Edge Hill United (5)	0–2	Gold Coast Knights (2)	Barlow Park, Cairns
19:30		Report	Macuace 85' (pen.); Mariner 90+5'	Attendance: 1,946; Referee: Alex King

21 September 2021	Lions FC (2)	6–0	Casuarina FC (2)	Lions Stadium, Brisbane
19:30	Farina 21', 69'; Solórzano 48'; Beakhurst 59'; Maltby 73'; Fiechtner 79'	Report		Attendance: 400; Referee: Casey Reibelt

South Zone

Avondale FC (2)	w/o	Devonport City (2)	ABD Stadium, Melbourne

10 November 2021	Hume City (2)	3–1	Port Melbourne (2)	ABD Stadium, Melbourne
19:30	Ochieng 17'; Bingham 90+2'; Bonada 90+3'	Report	Duggan 79'	Attendance: 419; Referee: Alex Liber

12 November 2021	South Melbourne (2)	0–3	Melbourne City (1)	Lakeside Stadium, Melbourne
19:30		Report	Metcalfe 23'; Galloway 66', 73'	Attendance: 4,291; Referee: Lachlan Keevers

7 December 2021	Western United (1)	0–1	Wellington Phoenix (1)	GMHBA Stadium, Geelong
19:30		Report	Waine 35'	Attendance: 1,217; Referee: Jack Morgan

West Zone

26 September 2021	Floreat Athena (2)	1–3 (a.e.t.)	Adelaide United (1)	Litis Stadium, Perth
15:00 (13:00 AWST)	Saldaris 56'	Report	D'Arrigo 18'; Blackwood 92' (pen.); Dukuly 102'	Attendance: 831; Referee: Adam Fielding

29 September 2021	ECU Joondalup (2)	0–3	Adelaide Olympic (2)	Dorrien Gardens, Perth
20:00 (18:00 AWST)		Report	Pounendis 70'; Erba 78'; Simosis 87'	Attendance: 485; Referee: Matthew Southern

1 December 2021	Adelaide City (2)	0–1	Melbourne Victory (1)	Marden Sports Complex, Adelaide
20:00 (19:30 ACDT)		Report	Leban 90+6' (pen.)	Attendance: 1,550; Referee: Daniel Cook

== Round of 16 ==
Due to fixture delays as a result of COVID-19 and State border restrictions, the round of 16 draw was conducted in two parts. The first draw took place on 30 September where the winners from the North & West zones were combined into one pool to determine the three fixtures. On 15 November the remaining draw was conducted with the East & South zones remaining separated.

The lowest ranked sides that qualified for this round were Adelaide Olympic, APIA Leichhardt Tigers, Avondale FC, Gold Coast Knights, Hume City, Lions FC and Wollongong Wolves. They were the only level 2 teams left in the competition.

Times are AEDT (UTC+11) as listed by Football Australia (local times, if different, are in parentheses).

East Zone

1 December 2021	Wollongong Wolves (2)	1–2	Central Coast Mariners (1)	WIN Stadium, Wollongong
19:30	Scott 23' (pen.)	Report	Moresche 64'; McCarthy 81'	Attendance: 2,189; Referee: Tim Danaskos

7 December 2021	APIA Leichhardt (2)	2–1	Western Sydney Wanderers (1)	Leichhardt Oval, Sydney
19:30	Romero 27'; Diaz 61'	Report	Mourdoukoutas 70'	Attendance: 4,171; Referee: Alex King

8 December 2021	Sydney FC (1)	2–0 (a.e.t.)	Macarthur FC (1)	Netstrata Jubilee Stadium, Sydney
20:00	Donachie 100'; Van Der Saag 119'	Report		Attendance: 1,201; Referee: Kurt Ams

North/West Zone

17 October 2021	Adelaide Olympic (2)	0–1	Adelaide United (1)	VALO Football Centre, Adelaide
15:30 (15:00 ACDT)		Report	Tratt 16'	Attendance: 2,637; Referee: Isabella Blaess

24 October 2021	Lions FC (2)	0–4	Brisbane Roar (1)	Lions Stadium, Brisbane
16:30 (15:30 AEST)		Report	Brown 8' (pen.); Dehmie 50', 78', 84'	Attendance: 2,465; Referee: Rachel Mitchenson

30 December 2021	Gold Coast Knights (2)	1–2 (a.e.t.)	Melbourne Victory (1)	Croatian Sports Centre, Gold Coast
20:30 (19:30 AEST)	Tipaldo 28'	Report	Lawrie-Lattanzio 53'; Wilson 96'	Attendance: 2,417; Referee: Chris Beath

South Zone

1 December 2021	Hume City (2)	0–1	Melbourne City (1)	ABD Stadium, Melbourne
20:00		Report	Leckie 20'	Attendance: 2,148; Referee: Lachlan Keevers

14 December 2021	Avondale FC (2)	1–4	Wellington Phoenix (1)	ABD Stadium, Melbourne
19:30	Reid 74'	Report	Sotirio 4', 14'; Waine 24'; Prso 81'	Attendance: 830; Referee: Adam Bavcar

== Quarter-finals ==
The draw took place on 5 December 2021. The lowest ranked side that qualified for this round was APIA Leichhardt Tigers. They were the only level 2 team left in the competition.

Times are AEDT (UTC+11) as listed by Football Australia (local times, if different, are in parentheses).

21 December 2021	APIA Leichhardt (2)	0–6	Central Coast Mariners (1)	Leichhardt Oval, Sydney
19:30		Report	Balard 8'; Hall 24'; Moresche 55'; Kuol 67'; Hatch 72'; Smith 88'	Attendance: 5,681; Referee: Kurt Ams

5 January 2022	Melbourne City (1)	0–0 (a.e.t.) (3–4 p)	Wellington Phoenix (1)	Kingston Heath Complex, Melbourne
19:30		Report		Attendance: 1,485; Referee: Ben Abraham
	Penalties
	Griffiths (penalty missed); O'Neill (penalty scored); Galloway (penalty missed); Metcalfe (penalty scored); Jamieson (penalty missed); Colakovski (penalty scored); Tilio (penalty missed)		(penalty scored) Waine; (penalty missed) Laws; (penalty missed) Fenton; (penalty missed) Rufer; (penalty scored) Sotirio; (penalty scored) Lewis; (penalty scored) Pennington

5 January 2022	Adelaide United (1)	1–2	Melbourne Victory (1)	Coopers Stadium, Adelaide
19:45 (19:15 ACDT)	Goodwin 33'	Report	Brillante 62'; Margiotta 79' (pen.)	Attendance: 3,156; Referee: Alex King

12 January 2022	Sydney FC (1)	1–0	Brisbane Roar (1)	Netstrata Jubilee Stadium, Sydney
18:00	Kamsoba 63'	Report		Attendance: 1,050; Referee: Tim Danaskos

== Semi-finals ==
The draw took place on 6 January 2022. This was a rare occurrence of all four semi-finalists being members of the top flight.

18 January 2022	Sydney FC (1)	0–1	Central Coast Mariners (1)	Netstrata Jubilee Stadium, Sydney
19:00		Report	Ureña 82' (pen.)	Attendance: 1,135; Referee: Alex King

29 January 2022	Melbourne Victory (1)	4–1	Wellington Phoenix (1)	GMHBA Stadium, Geelong
17:35	Brillante 65'; D'Agostino 80', 90+1'; Folami 85'	Report	Hooper 39'	Attendance: 2,034; Referee: Daniel Elder

== Final ==
5 February 2022
20:00 AEDT

Melbourne Victory (1)	2–1	Central Coast Mariners (1)
Davidson 70'; Ikonomidis 90+5'	Report	Bozanic 90+7'

AAMI Park, Melbourne
Attendance: 15,343
Referee: Shaun Evans

== Individual honours ==
The recipient of the Michael Cockerill Medal to recognise the tournament's standout National Premier Leagues performer was Finn Beakhurst from Lions FC. Jake Brimmer from Melbourne Victory and Kye Rowles from Central Coast Mariners shared the Mark Viduka Medal for the players of the match in the final, the first time in the competition's history with dual recipients.

== Top goalscorers ==
As of 29 January 2022

Rank	Player	Club	Goals
1	(Australia) Cyrus Dehmie	Brisbane Roar	3
2	(Australia) Joshua Brillante	Melbourne Victory	2
2	(Australia) Nicholas D'Agostino	Melbourne Victory	2
2	(Australia) Jordan Farina	Lions FC	2
2	(Australia) Scott Galloway	Melbourne City	2
2	(Burundi) Elvis Kamsoba	Sydney FC	2
2	(Brazil) Moresche	Central Coast Mariners	2
2	(Australia) Jason Romero	APIA Leichhardt	2
2	(Australia) Lachlan Rose	Macarthur FC	2
2	(Australia) Jaushua Sotirio	Wellington Phoenix	2
2	(New Zealand) Ben Waine	Wellington Phoenix	2

Note: Goals scored in preliminary rounds not included.

== Broadcasting rights ==
Matches were broadcast live on 10 Play. The final was broadcast on free-to-air TV through Network 10, a first for the competition.
