= Cyrus Dehmie =

Ivorian footballer

Personal information
- Full name: Cyrus Dehmie
- Date of birth: 25 May 2002 (age 24)
- Place of birth: Guiglo, Ivory Coast
- Height: 1.75 m (5 ft 9 in)
- Position: Forward

Team information
- Current team: Boeung Ket
- Number: 24

Youth career
- Tarragindi Tigers
- Rochedale Rovers
- 2018–2019: Brisbane Roar

Senior career*
| Years | Team | Apps | (Gls) |
| 2019–2022 | Brisbane Roar NPL | 42 | (25) |
| 2021–2023 | Brisbane Roar | 26 | (0) |
| 2023 | Næstved | 7 | (0) |
| 2024–2025 | Sydney Olympic FC | 29 | (13) |
| 2025– | Boeung Ket | 13 | (9) |
- * Club domestic league appearances and goals as of 26 October 2026 ‡ National team caps and goals as of 21 March 2021

Cyrus Dehmie (born 25 May 2002) is an Ivorian-Australian footballer who plays as a forward for Boeung Ket transferred from Sydney Olympic FC.

Dehmie started his professional career with Brisbane Roar and scored his first goal(s) for the Brisbane Roar on the 24th of October 2021 in which he scored a hat-trick in a round-of-16 FFA Cup match against Queensland Lions FC.

== Early life ==
Cyrus Dehmie was born in Ivory Coast and came with his parents to Australia in 2010. He attended Anglican Church Grammar School and was a member of the First XI who won the 2019 GPS Football Premiership, the school's first win since the competition began in 1991.
