= Juan Lescano =

Argentine footballer (born 1992)

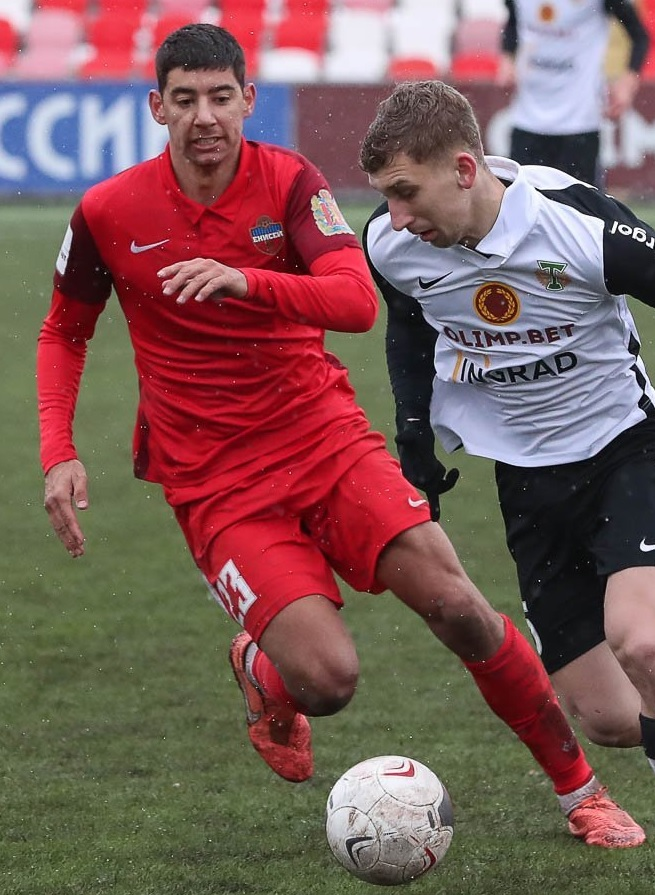
- Lescano with Yenisey in 2021

Personal information
- Full name: Juan Eduardo Lescano
- Date of birth: 29 October 1992 (age 34)
- Place of birth: Rauch, Argentina
- Height: 1.87 m (6 ft 2 in)
- Position: Striker

Team information
- Current team: Haka
- Number: 23

Youth career
- 2008–2009: Inter de Madrid
- 2010: Liverpool
- 2010–2011: Real Madrid

Senior career*
Years	Team	Apps	(Gls)
2012	Al-Ahli Club		
2012–2013	Lugano		
2013–2016	Yenisey Krasnoyarsk	74	(18)
2016–2017	SKA-Khabarovsk	32	(8)
2017–2019	Anzhi Makhachkala	21	(5)
2018	→ Tobol (loan)	9	(0)
2019	Hapoel Tel Aviv	0	(0)
2019–2021	Yenisey Krasnoyarsk	36	(9)
2021–2022	Brisbane Roar	20	(6)
2023	Haka	20	(9)
2024	Chongqing Tonglianglong	11	(3)
2025	Bashundhara Kings	2	(0)
2025–	Haka	7	(0)
- * Club domestic league appearances and goals as of 19 November 2025

Juan Eduardo Lescano (born 29 October 1992) is an Argentine professional footballer who plays as a striker for Veikkausliiga club Haka.

== Career ==
After initially moving to Europe with Liverpool F.C. as a 17 in early 2010, Lescano joined Real Madrid in July of the same year. Following his release from the Real Madrid youth team in 2011, Lescano spent the first half of 2012 at Al-Ahli Club before signing for FC Lugano in August 2012. In June 2013, Lescano signed for Russian FNL side Yenisey Krasnoyarsk.

On 26 July 2017, SKA-Khabarovsk announced Lescano had moved to FC Anzhi Makhachkala, with Anzhi confirming the following day that he had signed a three-year contract with the club.

On 17 July 2018, Lescano joined FC Tobol on loan for the 2018–19 season. He returned to Anzhi in January 2019.

On 20 September 2019, Lescano returned to Yenisey Krasnoyarsk on a contract until the end of the season.

On 6 August 2021, Lescano signed for Brisbane Roar. On 9 July 2022, Lescano left Brisbane Roar by mutual consent.

On 10 February 2023, Lescano joined Haka in Finland on a one-year contract.

On 4 February 2024, Lescano joined China League One club Chongqing Tonglianglong.

== Career statistics ==
=== Club ===
As of 19 August 2025

Appearances and goals by club, season and competition
Club	Season	League			National Cup		Other		Continental		Total	
Club	Season	Division	Apps	Goals	Apps	Goals	Apps	Goals	Apps	Goals	Apps	Goals
Yenisey Krasnoyarsk	2013–14	Russian FNL	27	7	1	0	–		–		28	7
Yenisey Krasnoyarsk	2014–15	Russian FNL	22	4	2	0	–		–		24	4
Yenisey Krasnoyarsk	2015–16	Russian FNL	25	7	2	1	–		–		27	8
Yenisey Krasnoyarsk	Total		74	18	5	1	-	-	-	-	79	19
SKA-Khabarovsk	2016–17	Russian FNL	30	8	2	0	2 (Note: Two appearances in relegation play-offs)	0	–		34	8
SKA-Khabarovsk	2017–18	Russian Premier League	2	0	0	0	–		–		2	0
SKA-Khabarovsk	Total		32	8	2	0	2	0	-	-	36	8
Anzhi Makhachkala	2017–18	Russian Premier League	17	5	0	0	2	0	–		19	5
Anzhi Makhachkala	2018–19	Russian Premier League	4	0	0	0	–		–		4	0
Anzhi Makhachkala	Total		21	5	0	0	2	0	-	-	23	5
Tobol (loan)	2018	Kazakhstan Premier League	9	0	0	0	–		2	0	11	0
Hapoel Tel Aviv	2019–20	Israeli Premier League	0	0	0	0	1	0	–		1	0
Yenisey Krasnoyarsk	2019–20	Russian FNL	8	0	0	0	–		–		8	0
Yenisey Krasnoyarsk	2020–21	Russian FNL	28	9	2	2	–		–		30	11
Yenisey Krasnoyarsk	Total		36	9	2	2	-	-	-	-	38	11
Brisbane Roar	2021–22	A-League	20	6	3	1	–		–		23	7
Haka	2023	Veikkausliiga	20	9	1	0	4	1	1 (Note: Appearance in UEFA Europa Conference League)	0	26	10
Chongqing Tonglianglong	2024	China League One	11	3	1	0	–		–		12	3
Bashundhara Kings	2024–25	Bangladesh Premier League	2	0	0	0	–		–		2	0
Haka	2025	Veikkausliiga	0	0	–		–		–		0	0
Career total			225	58	14	4	9	1	3	0	253	61
