= 2025–26 Perth Glory FC season =

Perth Glory
2025–26 season
- Owner: Pelligra Group
- Chairman: Ross Pelligra
- Head coach: David Zdrilic (to 28 October 2025); Adam Griffiths (from 28 October 2025)
- Stadium: HBF Park
- A-League Men: 10th
- A-League Men Finals: DNQ
- 2025 Australia Cup: Round of 32
- Top goalscorer: League: Tom Lawrence; Nicholas Pennington; Adam Taggart (5 goals); All: Adam Taggart (6 goals)
- Highest home attendance: 12,594 vs. Brisbane Roar (16 January 2026); A-League Men
- Lowest home attendance: 5,295 vs. Melbourne Victory (31 October 2025); A-League Men
- Average home league attendance: 7,080
- Biggest win: 3–0 vs. Central Coast Mariners (H)(10 January 2026); A-League Men
- Biggest defeat: 0–4 vs. Melbourne City (A)(25 October 2025); A-League Men; 0–4 vs. Adelaide United (A)(20 February 2026); A-League Men
Home colours	Away colours
- All statistics correct as of 25 April 2026.

The 2025–26 season was Perth Glory Football Club's 21st season in the A-League Men, and their 29th season in the top flight of Australian soccer. In addition to the domestic league, Perth Glory also participated in this season's edition of the Australia Cup.

== Players ==
Note: Flags indicate national team as defined under FIFA eligibility rules; some limited exceptions apply. Players may hold more than one non-FIFA nationality.

No.	Pos.	Nation	Player
1	GK	AUS	Mark Birighitti
2	DF	IRQ	Charbel Shamoon
3	DF	NZL	Sam Sutton
4	DF	ENG	Scott Wootton (co-captain)
5	DF	AUS	Riley Foxe (scholarship)
6	MF	AUS	Brandon O'Neill
7	MF	AUS	Nicholas Pennington
8	MF	ENG	Callum Timmins
9	FW	AUS	Jaiden Kucharski
11	FW	AUS	Lachlan Wales
13	GK	AUS	Cameron Cook
15	DF	AUS	Zach Lisolajski
16	FW	AUS	Gabriel Popovic
17	FW	AUS	Arion Sulemani
18	MF	AUS	Luca Tevere

No.	Pos.	Nation	Player
19	DF	AUS	Josh Risdon
20	MF	AUS	Trent Ostler
22	FW	AUS	Adam Taggart (co-captain)
23	MF	AUS	Anthony Didulica (scholarship)
24	DF	AUS	Andriano Lebib
25	MF	AUS	Sebastian Despotovski (scholarship)
27	MF	AUS	Will Freney (scholarship)
29	GK	AUS	Matt Sutton
30	DF	AUS	Tadiwanashe Kuzamba (scholarship)
31	FW	SSD	Joel Anasmo
34	FW	WAL	Tom Lawrence
35	MF	AUS	Oliver Evans (scholarship)
39	MF	AUS	Giovanni de Abreu (scholarship)
45	DF	VAN	Brian Kaltak
67	FW	MKD	Stefan Colakovski

== Transfers and contracts ==
=== Transfers in ===
No.	Position	Name	From	Type/fee	Contract length	Date	Ref.
1	GK	Mark Birighitti	(Australia) Perth SC	Free transfer	2 years	4 June 2025	
31	FW	(South Sudan) Joel Anasmo	(South Korea) Jeonbuk Hyundai Motors	Loan return	2 years remaining	1 July 2025	
3	DF	(New Zealand) Sam Sutton	Wellington Phoenix	Free transfer	3 years	1 July 2025	
4	DF	(England) Scott Wootton	Wellington Phoenix	Free transfer	2 years	1 July 2025	
8	MF	Callum Timmins	Newcastle Jets	Free transfer	3 years	1 July 2025	
45	DF	(Vanuatu) Brian Kaltak	Central Coast Mariners	Free transfer	2 years	1 July 2025	
17	FW	Arion Sulemani	Melbourne City	Free transfer	2 years	1 July 2025	
9	FW	Jaiden Kucharski	Western United	Free transfer	2 years	21 August 2025	
16	FW	Gabriel Popovic	Unattached	Free transfer	Short-term	29 August 2025	
2	DF	(Iraq) Charbel Shamoon	Unattached	Free transfer	2 years	16 September 2025	
18	MF	Rhys Bozinovski	Unattached	Free transfer	2 years	19 September 2025	
34	FW	(Wales) Tom Lawrence	Unattached	Free transfer	1 year	10 October 2025	
29	GK	Matt Sutton	Unattached	Injury replacement	3 months	16 October 2025	
5	DF	Riley Foxe	Unattached	Scholarship	2 years	30 October 2025	
23	MF	Anthony Didulica	Unattached	Scholarship	3 years	6 January 2026	
67	FW	(North Macedonia) Stefan Colakovski	Unattached	Free transfer	6 months	21 January 2026	
18	MF	Luca Tevere	(Australia) Preston Lions	Free transfer	5 months	10 February 2026	

==== From youth squad ====
N	Pos.	Nat.	Name	Age	Notes
25	MF	(Australia)	Sebastian Despotovski	19	2-year scholarship contract
35	MF	(Australia)	Oliver Evans	17	2-year scholarship contract
30	DF	(Australia)	Tadiwanashe Kuzamba	18	2-year scholarship contract
39	MF	(Australia)	Giovanni de Abreu	18	1-year scholarship contract

=== Transfers out ===
No.	Position	Name	To	Type/fee	Date	Ref.
2	DF	Riley Warland	(Australia) Stirling Macedonia	End of contract	27 June 2025	
4	DF	Tass Mourdoukoutas	(Australia) Marconi Stallions	End of contract	29 June 2025	
3	DF	(Belgium) Anas Hamzaoui	Unattached	Mutual contract termination	30 June 2025	
5	DF	Lachlan Barr	Unattached	End of contract	30 June 2025	
10	FW	Nikola Mileusnic	Wellington Phoenix	End of contract	30 June 2025	
11	MF	(Japan) Hiroaki Aoyama	Unattached	End of contract	30 June 2025	
17	DF	(Japan) Yuto Misao	Unattached	End of contract	30 June 2025	
23	FW	Patrick Wood	Sydney FC	End of loan	30 June 2025	
25	MF	Jaylan Pearman	(England) Queens Park Rangers	End of contract	30 June 2025	
29	DF	Tomislav Mrčela	Unattached	End of contract	30 June 2025	
36	DF	(Japan) Takuya Okamoto	Unattached	End of contract	30 June 2025	
1	GK	(New Zealand) Oliver Sail	Auckland FC	Mutual contract termination	18 August 2025	
9	FW	David Williams	Unattached	End of contract	5 November 2025	
26	FW	(Vietnam) Khoa Ngo	(Vietnam) Cong An Ho Chi Minh City	Loan	4 January 2026	
14	FW	Nathanael Blair	Central Coast Mariners	Mutual contract termination	6 January 2026	
21	FW	Adam Bugarija	(Australia) Marconi Stallions	Loan	29 January 2026	
18	MF	Rhys Bozinovski	(Netherlands) Heracles Almelo	Undisclosed	3 February 2026	
28	DF	Kaelan Majekodunmi	(Australia) Dandenong Thunder	Loan	10 February 2026	
10	MF	(England) Luke Amos	(South Korea) Paju Frontier	Mutual contract termination	13 February 2026	
12	MF	Taras Gomulka	(Canada) Pacific FC	Mutual contract termination	15 February 2026	

=== Contract extensions ===
No.	Name	Position	Duration	Date	Notes and references
20	Trent Ostler	Winger	2 years	21 May 2025	
11	Lachlan Wales	Winger	1 year	22 May 2025	
21	(England) Luke Amos	Central midfielder	1 year	23 May 2025	
27	Will Freney	Central midfielder	2 years	4 July 2025	
29	Matt Sutton	Goalkeeper	3 years	14 January 2026	permanent contract

== Pre-season and friendlies ==
Win Draw Loss Fixtures

31 July 2025	Perth Glory (Australia)	0–9	(Italy) AC Milan	Perth
18:20 AWST		Report	F. Terracciano 3'; Okafor 22', 25'; Comotto 30' (pen.); Chukwueze 32'; Leão 46', 86'; Ricci 58'; Musah 80'	Stadium: HBF Park; Attendance: 19,226; Referee: Daniel Elder

6 September 2025	Stirling Macedonia (Australia)	2–7	(Australia) Perth Glory	Perth
17:00 AWST	Dweh 43'; McKenzie 65' (pen.)	Report	Nelson 2' (o.g.); Taggart 10'; Sutton 30'; Sulemani 55'; Lisolajski 57'; Lebib 61'; Anasmo 88'	Stadium: Macedonia Park; Referee: Niall Gilmour

17 September 2025 Challenge Cup	WA State Team (Western Australia)	Cancelled	Perth Glory	Perth
18:30		Cancellation		Stadium: Dorrien Gardens

21 September 2025	Perth Glory (Australia)	0–1	(Australia) Melbourne Victory	Mandurah
15:00 AWST		Report	Valadon 48'	Stadium: Peelwood Reserve; Attendance: 2,000+ Referee: Shane Skinner

24 September 2025	Perth Glory (Australia)	0–3	(Australia) Melbourne Victory	Bunbury
18:30 AWST		Report	Reec 20'; Grimaldi 54'; Dragicevic 90+1'	Stadium: Hay Park

7 October 2025	Sydney FC (Australia)	3–1	(Australia) Perth Glory	Sydney
8:00 AWST	Campuzano 36', 52'; Macallister 84'	Report	Taggart 33'	Stadium: Sydney Olympic Park Athletic Centre; Attendance: 0 (behind closed doors)

10 October 2025	Western Sydney Wanderers (Australia)	2–1	(Australia) Perth Glory	Sydney
8:00 AWST	Hammond; Barbarouses	Report	Wales	Stadium: Wanderers Football Park; Attendance: 0 (behind closed doors)

== Competitions ==
=== Overall record ===
Competition	First match	Last match	Starting round	Final position	Record							
Competition	First match	Last match	Starting round	Final position	Pld	W	D	L	GF	GA	GD	Win %
A-League Men	18 October 2025	25 April 2026	Matchday 1	10th	26	8	7	11	32	39	−7	30.77
Australia Cup	27 July 2025	27 July 2025	Round of 32	Round of 32	1	0	1	0	1	1	+0	0.00
Total					27	8	8	11	33	40	−7	29.63

Last updated: 25 April 2026
Source: Competitions

=== A-League Men ===
==== League table ====
Pos	Team	Pld	W	D	L	GF	GA	GD	Pts
8	Wellington Phoenix (Note: Auckland FC and Wellington Phoenix cannot qualify for Asian Football Confederation competitions as they are based in New Zealand, which is part of the Oceania Football Confederation.)	26	9	6	11	36	48	−12	33
9	Central Coast Mariners	26	8	8	10	35	42	−7	32
10	Perth Glory	26	8	7	11	32	39	−7	31
11	Brisbane Roar	26	6	8	12	27	36	−9	26
12	Western Sydney Wanderers	26	5	6	15	27	43	−16	21

Source: A-Leagues
Rules for classification: 1) points; 2) goal difference; 3) goals scored; 4) wins; 5) head-to-head results; 5a) head-to-head points; 5b) head-to-head goal difference; 6) Fair Play points; 7) away goal difference; 8) away goals per match; 9) home goal difference; 10) home goals per match; 11) toss of a coin in an event of a tie of two clubs.

==== Results summary ====
Overall								Home						Away					
Pld	W	D	L	GF	GA	GD	Pts	W	D	L	GF	GA	GD	W	D	L	GF	GA	GD
26	8	7	11	32	39	−7	31	5	2	6	16	16	0	3	5	5	16	23	−7

Last updated: 25 April 2026.
Source: Ultimate A-League

==== Results by round ====
Round	1	2	3	4	5	6	7	8	9	10	11	12	13	14	15	16	17	18	19	20	21	22	23	24	25	26
Ground	H	A	H	H	A	A	H	H	H	A	A	H	H	A	H	A	H	A	A	A	A	H	A	H	A	H
Result	D	L	L	L	W	W	W	L	L	W	L	W	L	L	W	D	L	L	D	D	L	D	D	W	D	W
Position	5	12	12	12	11	10	5	5	10	8	10	9	10	10	9	9	9	10	10	10	11	11	11	10	10	10
Points	1	1	1	1	4	7	10	10	10	13	13	16	16	16	19	20	20	20	21	22	22	23	24	27	28	31

Updated to match(es) played on 25 April 2026. Source: Ultimate A-League
A = Away; H = Home; N = Neutral; B = Bye; W = Win; D = Draw; L = Loss; X = Bye

==== Matches ====
Win Draw Loss Fixtures

18 October 2025 1	Perth Glory	2–2	Wellington Phoenix	Perth
18:45 AWT	Taggart 16'; Kucharski 28'	Report	Eze 45+3'; Armiento 69'	Stadium: HBF Park; Attendance: 7,868; Referee: Ben Abraham

25 October 2025 2	Melbourne City	4–0	Perth Glory	Melbourne
14:00 AEDT	Caputo 5', 36'; Schreiber 84'; Rahmani 90+1'	Report		Stadium: AAMI Park; Attendance: 6,102; Referee: Alireza Faghani

31 October 2025 3	Perth Glory	0–2	Melbourne Victory	Perth
18:45 AWT		Report	Jelacic 11'; Mata 54'	Stadium: HBF Park; Attendance: 5,295; Referee: Shaun Evans

7 November 2025 4	Perth Glory	0–1	Central Coast Mariners	Perth
17:45 AWST		Report	Brandtman 57'	Stadium: HBF Park; Attendance: 5,889; Referee: Shane Skinner

23 November 2025 5	Newcastle Jets	1–2	Perth Glory	Newcastle
17:00 AEDT	Bertoncello 15'	Report	Lawrence 38'; Pennington 79' (pen.)	Stadium: McDonald Jones Stadium; Attendance: 5,578; Referee: Nathan Shakespear

30 November 2025 6	Macarthur FC	0–2	Perth Glory	Sydney
15:00 AEDT		Report	Pennington 66'; Shamoon 88'	Stadium: Campbelltown Sports Stadium; Attendance: 3,123; Referee: Jonathan Barreiro

5 December 2025 7	Perth Glory	1–0	Western Sydney Wanderers	Perth
18:45 AWT	Despotovski 30'	Report		Stadium: HBF Park; Attendance: 5,590; Referee: Shane Skinner

13 December 2025 8	Perth Glory	0–1	Sydney FC	Perth
18:45 AWST		Report	Walatee 5'	Stadium: HBF Park; Attendance: 6,689; Referee: Lachlan Keevers

20 December 2025 9	Perth Glory	0–1	Adelaide United	Perth
18:45 AWT		Report	Goodwin 12'	Stadium: HBF Park; Attendance: 6,678; Referee: Sam Kelly

28 December 2025 10	Melbourne City	1–3	Perth Glory	Melbourne
16:00 AEDT	Nabbout 90+3'	Report	Lawrence 10', 22', 80'	Stadium: AAMI Park; Attendance: 7,035; Referee: Casey Reibelt

2 January 2026 11	Melbourne Victory	3–2	Perth Glory	Melbourne
16:35 AEDT	D'Arrigo 45+5'; Velupillay 53'; Santos 69'	Report	Ostler 12'; Ngo 79'	Stadium: AAMI Park; Attendance: 10,533; Referee: Casey Reibelt

10 January 2026 12	Perth Glory	3–0	Central Coast Mariners	Perth
18:45 AWT	Pennington 24'; Taggart 45+1'; Lawrence 54'	Report		Stadium: HBF Park; Attendance: 7,912; Referee: Ben Abraham

16 January 2026 13	Perth Glory	1–2	Brisbane Roar	Perth
18:45 AWST	Taggart 19'	Report	Long 30' (pen.); Klein 50'	Stadium: HBF Park; Attendance: 12,594; Referee: Adam Kersey

25 January 2026 14	Western Sydney Wanderers	1–0	Perth Glory	Sydney
18:45 AWST	Fraser 90+2'	Report		Stadium: CommBank Stadium; Attendance: 5,178; Referee: Ben Abraham

31 January 2026 15	Perth Glory	2–1	Auckland FC	Perth
18:45 AWT	Kucharski 75', 90'	Report	Randall 42'	Stadium: HBF Park; Attendance: 7,528; Referee: Shaun Evans

6 February 2026 16	Macarthur FC	2–2	Perth Glory	Sydney
16:35 AEDT	Pennington 36'; Colakovski 90'	Report	Duke 60'; Talbot 71'	Stadium: Campbelltown Sports Stadium; Attendance: 3,906; Referee: Alireza Faghani

13 February 2026 17	Perth Glory	1–3	Newcastle Jets	Perth
18:45 AWT	Colakovski 90+1'	Report	Bayliss 15'; Rose 47'; Bertoncello 81'	Stadium: HBF Park; Attendance: 7,177; Referee: Lachlan Keevers

20 February 2026 18	Adelaide United	4–0	Perth Glory	Adelaide
16:35 ACDT	Muñiz 12'; Yull 29'; Jovanovic 48'; Duzel 90+1'	Report		Stadium: Coopers Stadium; Attendance: 8,537; Referee: Shaun Evans

28 February 2026 19	Brisbane Roar	1–1	Perth Glory	Kippa-Ring
15:00 AEST	Long 16'	Report	Salas 19' (o.g.)	Stadium: Kayo Stadium; Attendance: 3,610; Referee: Adam Kersey
Note: The match was relocated from Suncorp Stadium due to heavy usage of the surface.

8 March 2026 20	Auckland FC	2–2	Perth Glory	Auckland
10:00 NZDT	Cosgrove 7'; M. Sutton 64' (o.g.)	Report	Kaltak 39'; Colakovski 57'	Stadium: Go Media Stadium; Attendance: 12,777; Referee: Declan Woods

14 March 2026 21	Wellington Phoenix	2–0	Perth Glory	Wellington
15:00 NZDT	Piper 55'; Pennington 84' (o.g.)	Report		Stadium: Hnry Stadium; Attendance: 3,766; Referee: Nathan Shakespear

22 March 2026 22	Perth Glory	1–1	Melbourne City	Perth
16:00 AWT	Taggart 90+1'	Report	Arzani 21'	Stadium: HBF Park; Attendance: 6,029; Referee: Shaun Evans

4 April 2026 23	Central Coast Mariners	2–2	Perth Glory	Gosford
12:00 AEDT	Auglah 37'; Brandtman 66'	Report	Despotovski 14'; Taggart 17'	Stadium: polytec Stadium; Attendance: 4,232; Referee: Ben Abraham

12 April 2026 24	Perth Glory	3–1	Macarthur FC	Perth
17:00 AWST	Pennington 48'; Popovic 76'; Sulemani 90+5'	Report	Vickery 68'	Stadium: HBF Park; Attendance: 5,893; Referee: Shane Skinner

18 April 2026 25	Sydney FC	0–0	Perth Glory	Sydney
17:35 AEDT		Report		Stadium: Allianz Stadium; Attendance: 10,212; Referee: Eric Saba

25 April 2026 26	Perth Glory	2–1	Brisbane Roar	Perth
19:45 AWST	Popovic 8' (pen.); Despotovski 76'	Report	Valkanis 65'	Stadium: HBF Park; Attendance: 6,901; Referee: Tim Danaskos

=== Australia Cup ===
The playoff round for the 2025 Australia Cup was held just after the regular season of the previous season.

27 July 2025 Round of 32	Perth Glory	1–1 (a.e.t.) (7–8 p)	Wellington Phoenix	Perth
15:00 AWST	Taggart 89'	Report	L. Kelly-Heald 20'	Stadium: Kingsway Reserve; Attendance: 1,141; Referee: Liam Barclay
	Penalties
	Taggart (penalty scored); Bugarija (penalty scored); Gomulka (penalty scored); Ngo (penalty scored); O'Neill (penalty missed); Majekodunmi (penalty scored); Sutton (penalty scored); Lebib (penalty scored); Kaltak (penalty missed)		(penalty missed) Nagasawa; (penalty scored) Supyk; (penalty scored) Ishige; (penalty scored) Retre; (penalty scored) Candy; (penalty scored) Hughes; (penalty scored) Gillion; (penalty scored) Smith; (penalty scored) L. Kelly-Heald

== Statistics ==
=== Appearances and goals ===
Includes all competitions. Players with no appearances not included in the list.

As of match played 25 April 2026

No.	Pos.	Nat.	Name	A-League Men		2025 Australia Cup		Total	
No.	Pos.	Nat.	Name	Apps	Goals	Apps	Goals	Apps	Goals
2	DF	(Iraq)	Charbel Shamoon	24+1	1	0	0	25	1
3	DF	(New Zealand)	Sam Sutton	18+1	0	1	0	20	0
4	DF	(England)	Scott Wootton	26	0	1	0	27	0
5	DF	(Australia)	Riley Foxe	0+4	0	0	0	4	0
6	MF	(Australia)	Brandon O'Neill	2+2	0	0+1	0	5	0
7	MF	(Australia)	Nicholas Pennington	17+6	5	0	0	23	5
8	MF	(Australia)	Callum Timmins	7+5	0	1	0	13	0
9	FW	(Australia)	Jaiden Kucharski	15+4	3	0	0	19	3
11	FW	(Australia)	Lachlan Wales	5+1	0	0	0	6	0
15	DF	(Australia)	Zach Lisolajski	0+6	0	0	0	6	0
16	FW	(Australia)	Gabriel Popovic	3+6	2	0	0	9	2
17	FW	(Australia)	Arion Sulemani	4+6	1	1	0	11	1
18	MF	(Australia)	Luca Tevere	5+4	0	0	0	9	0
19	DF	(Australia)	Josh Risdon	5+6	0	1	0	12	0
20	MF	(Australia)	Trent Ostler	12+7	1	1	0	20	1
22	FW	(Australia)	Adam Taggart	15+7	5	0+1	1	23	6
23	MF	(Australia)	Anthony Didiluca	0+5	0	0	0	5	0
24	DF	(Australia)	Andriano Lebib	2+6	0	0+1	0	9	0
25	MF	(Australia)	Sebastian Despotovski	13+5	3	0	0	18	3
27	MF	(Australia)	Will Freney	19+4	0	0	0	23	0
29	GK	(Australia)	Matt Sutton	26	0	0	0	26	0
30	DF	(Australia)	Tadiwanashe Kuzamba	0+1	0	0	0	1	0
31	FW	(South Sudan)	Joel Anasmo	0+1	0	1	0	2	0
34	MF	(Wales)	Tom Lawrence	13	5	0	0	13	5
39	MF	(Australia)	Giovanni De Abreu	12+5	0	0	0	17	0
45	DF	(Vanuatu)	Brian Kaltak	25	1	0+1	0	26	1
67	FW	(North Macedonia)	Stefan Colakovski	4+9	3	0	0	13	3
Player(s) transferred out but featured this season
1	GK	(New Zealand)	Oliver Sail	0	0	1	0	1	0
10	MF	(England)	Luke Amos	0+3	0	0	0	3	0
12	MF	(Australia)	Taras Gomulka	0	0	1	0	1	0
14	FW	(Australia)	Nathanael Blair	0+2	0	1	0	3	0
18	MF	(Australia)	Rhys Bozinovski	14	0	0	0	14	0
21	MF	(Australia)	Adam Bugarija	0+3	0	0+1	0	4	0
26	FW	(Vietnam)	Khoa Ngo	0+6	1	0+1	0	7	1
28	DF	(Australia)	Kaelan Majekodunmi	0	0	1	0	1	0

=== Disciplinary record ===
Includes all competitions. The list is sorted by squad number when total cards are equal. Players with no cards not included in the list.

As of match played 25 April 2026

Rank	No.	Pos.	Nat.	Name	A-League Men			2025 Australia Cup			Total							
Rank	No.	Pos.	Nat.	Name	Booked	(yellow card) (yellow-red card)	Sent off (straight red)	Booked	(yellow card) (yellow-red card)	Sent off (straight red)	Booked	(yellow card) (yellow-red card)	Sent off (straight red)					
Rank	No.	Pos.	Nat.	Name	1	45	DF	(Vanuatu)	Brian Kaltak	1	0	1	0	0	0	1	0	1
2	20	MF	(Australia)	Trent Ostler	1	1	0	1	0	0	2	1	0					
3	39	MF	(Australia)	Giovanni De Abreu	7	0	0	0	0	0	7	0	0					
4	19	DF	(Australia)	Josh Risdon	5	0	0	1	0	0	6	0	0					
5	4	DF	(England)	Scott Wootton	4	0	0	0	0	0	5	0	0					
5	27	MF	(Australia)	Will Freney	5	0	0	0	0	0	5	0	0					
7	25	MF	(Australia)	Sebastian Despotovski	4	0	0	0	0	0	4	0	0					
7	34	MF	(Wales)	Tom Lawrence	4	0	0	0	0	0	4	0	0					
9	7	MF	(Australia)	Nicholas Pennington	3	0	0	0	0	0	3	0	0					
9	8	MF	(Australia)	Callum Timmins	2	0	0	1	0	0	3	0	0					
9	22	FW	(Australia)	Adam Taggart	3	0	0	0	0	0	3	0	0					
12	9	FW	(Australia)	Jaiden Kucharski	2	0	0	0	0	0	2	0	0					
12	24	DF	(Iraq)	Andriano Lebib	2	0	0	0	0	0	2	0	0					
12	29	GK	(Australia)	Matt Sutton	2	0	0	0	0	0	2	0	0					
12	67	FW	(North Macedonia)	Stefan Colakovski	2	0	0	0	0	0	2	0	0					
16	2	DF	(Iraq)	Charbel Shamoon	1	0	0	0	0	0	1	0	0					
16	3	DF	(New Zealand)	Sam Sutton	1	0	0	0	0	0	1	0	0					
16	9	FW	(Australia)	Gabriel Popovic	1	0	0	0	0	0	1	0	0					
Player(s) transferred out but featured this season
1	18	MF	(Australia)	Rhys Bozinovski	3	0	0	0	0	0	3	0	0					
2	10	MF	(England)	Luke Amos	2	0	0	0	0	0	2	0	0					
3	12	MF	(Australia)	Taras Gomulka	0	0	0	1	0	0	1	0	0					
3	26	FW	(Vietnam)	Khoa Ngo	0	0	0	1	0	0	1	0	0					
Total					56	1	1	5	0	0	61	1	1					

=== Clean sheets ===
Includes all competitions. The list is sorted by squad number when total clean sheets are equal. Numbers in parentheses represent games where both goalkeepers participated and both kept a clean sheet; the number in parentheses is awarded to the goalkeeper who was substituted on, whilst a full clean sheet is awarded to the goalkeeper who was on the field at the start of play. Goalkeepers with no clean sheets not included in the list.

As of match played 25 April 2026

Rank	No.	Nat.	Goalkeeper	A-League Men	2025 Australia Cup	Total
1	29	(Australia)	Matt Sutton	4	0	4
Total				4	0	4

== See also ==
- 2025–26 Perth Glory FC (women) season
