= 2024–25 Perth Glory FC season =

Perth Glory
2024–25 season
- Owner: Pelligra Group
- Chairman: Ross Pelligra
- Head coach: David Zdrilic
- Stadium: HBF Park
- A-League Men: 13th
- A-League Men Finals: DNQ
- 2024 Australia Cup: Round of 16
- 2025 Australia Cup preliminary rounds: Qualified for Round of 32
- Top goalscorer: League: Adam Taggart (10); All: Adam Taggart (12)
- Highest home attendance: 11,035 vs. Melbourne Victory (1 February 2025); A-League Men
- Lowest home attendance: 2,015 vs. Melbourne City (3 August 2024); Australia Cup
- Average home league attendance: 6,562
- Biggest win: 4–1 vs. Adelaide United (H) (12 April 2025); A-League Men
- Biggest defeat: 1–6 vs. Macarthur FC (A) (20 October 2024); A-League Men; 0–5 vs. Melbourne City (H) (10 November 2024); A-League Men
Home colours	Away colours
- All statistics correct as of 13 May 2025.

The 2024–25 season was Perth Glory Football Club's 20th season in the A-League Men, and their 28th season in the top flight of Australian soccer. In addition to the domestic league, Perth Glory also participated in this season's edition of the Australia Cup.

== Players ==
Note: Flags indicate national team as defined under FIFA eligibility rules; some limited exceptions apply. Players may hold more than one non-FIFA nationality.

No.	Pos.	Nation	Player
1	GK	NZL	Oliver Sail
2	DF	AUS	Riley Warland
3	DF	BEL	Anas Hamzaoui
4	DF	AUS	Tass Mourdoukoutas
5	DF	AUS	Lachlan Barr
6	MF	AUS	Brandon O'Neill
7	MF	AUS	Nicholas Pennington
8	FW	AUS	Lachlan Wales
9	FW	AUS	David Williams (vice-captain)
10	FW	AUS	Nikola Mileusnic
11	MF	JPN	Hiroaki Aoyama
12	MF	AUS	Taras Gomulka
13	GK	AUS	Cameron Cook
14	FW	AUS	Nathanael Blair
15	DF	AUS	Zach Lisolajski

No.	Pos.	Nation	Player
16	MF	AUS	Adam Bugarija
17	DF	JPN	Yuto Misao
19	DF	AUS	Josh Risdon
20	MF	AUS	Trent Ostler
21	MF	ENG	Luke Amos
22	FW	AUS	Adam Taggart (captain)
23	FW	AUS	Patrick Wood (on loan from Sydney FC)
24	DF	AUS	Andriano Lebib
25	MF	AUS	Jaylan Pearman (scholarship)
26	FW	VIE	Khoa Ngo (scholarship)
27	MF	AUS	Will Freney (scholarship)
28	DF	AUS	Kaelan Majekodunmi
29	DF	AUS	Tomislav Mrčela
36	DF	JPN	Takuya Okamoto

== Transfers and contracts ==
=== Transfers in ===
No.	Position	Name	From	Type/fee	Contract length	Date	Ref.
10	FW	(Tunisia) Salim Khelifi	Melbourne Victory	End of loan	(1 year)	28 May 2024	
19	DF	Josh Risdon	Unattached	Free transfer	2 years	29 May 2024	
6	MF	Brandon O'Neill	Newcastle Jets	Free transfer	2 years	31 May 2024	
15	DF	Zach Lisolajski	Western United Youth	Free transfer	2 years	6 June 2024	
3	DF	(Belgium) Anas Hamzaoui	Unattached	Free transfer	2 years	10 June 2024	
14	FW	Nathanael Blair	Western Sydney Wanderers	Free transfer	2 years	12 June 2024	
7	MF	Nicholas Pennington	Wellington Phoenix	Free transfer	2 years	19 June 2024	
16	MF	Adam Bugarija	Western Sydney Wanderers Youth	Free transfer	3 years	20 June 2024	
21	FW	Abdelelah Faisal	Bulls FC Academy	Free transfer	1 year	20 June 2024	
12	MF	Taras Gomulka	Brisbane Roar	Free transfer	2 years	21 June 2024	
5	DF	Lachlan Barr	Unattached	Free transfer	1 year	5 July 2024	
11	MF	(Japan) Hiroaki Aoyama	(Australia) Marconi Stallions	Free transfer	1 year	17 July 2024	
10	FW	Nikola Mileusnic	Unattached	Free transfer	1 year	17 July 2024	
33	DF	(Ecuador) Luis Cangá	Unattached	Free transfer	1 year	10 September 2024	
23	FW	(Colombia) Cristian Caicedo	(Colombia) Orsomarso	Free transfer	1 year	12 September 2024	
29	DF	Tomislav Mrčela	Unattached	Free transfer	6 months	6 December 2024	
8	FW	Lachlan Wales	Unattached	Free transfer	6 months	16 January 2025	
17	DF	(Japan) Yuto Misao	(Japan) Kyoto Sanga	Free transfer	6 months	16 January 2025	
36	DF	(Japan) Takuya Okamoto	(Japan) Shonan Bellmare	Free transfer	6 months	16 January 2025	
23	FW	Patrick Wood	Sydney FC	Loan	6 months	17 January 2025	
4	DF	Tass Mourdoukoutas	Unattached	Free transfer	6 months	24 January 2025	
21	MF	(England) Luke Amos	Unattached	Free transfer	5 months (Note: Option for an additional year.)	14 February 2025	

==== From youth squad ====
N	Pos.	Nat.	Name	Age	Notes
24	DF	(Australia)	Andriano Lebib	18	1-year scholarship
26	FW	(Vietnam)	Khoa Ngo	17	2-year scholarship
31	FW	(South Sudan)	Joel Anasmo	19	2-year contract
27	MF	(Australia)	Will Freney	18	2-year scholarship

=== Transfers out ===
No.	Position	Name	To	Type/fee	Date	Ref.
5	DF	(England) Mark Beevers	Unattached	End of contract	8 May 2024	
29	DF	(Curaçao) Darryl Lachman	Unattached	End of contract	8 May 2024	
15	DF	Aleksandar Šušnjar	Unattached	End of contract	21 May 2024	
2	DF	John Koutroumbis	(Scotland) Motherwell	End of contract	28 May 2024	
7	FW	(North Macedonia) Stefan Colakovski	Unattached	End of contract	28 May 2024	
10	FW	(Tunisia) Salim Khelifi	Unattached	Mututal contract termination	28 May 2024	
16	DF	Joshua Rawlins	(Netherlands) Jong Utrecht	End of loan	28 May 2024	
21	MF	(Cyprus) Antonis Martis	Unattached	End of contract	28 May 2024	
27	FW	Jayden Gorman	Unattached	End of contract	28 May 2024	
77	FW	(Kenya) Bruce Kamau	Unattached	End of contract	28 May 2024	
23	FW	Daniel Bennie	(England) Queens Park Rangers	Undisclosed	30 May 2024	
11	FW	Adam Zimarino	Brisbane Roar	Mutual contract termination	26 June 2024	
20	MF	Giordano Colli	Unattached	End of contract	23 August 2024	
29	DF	Jacob Muir	(United States) Monterey Bay	Mutual contract termination	28 November 2024	
33	DF	(Ecuador) Luis Cangá	Unattached	Mutual contract termination	18 December 2024	
23	FW	(Colombia) Cristian Caicedo	Unattached	Mutual contract termination	23 December 2024	
8	MF	Mustafa Amini	Unattached	Contract terminated	28 December 2024	
4	MF	Luke Bodnar	(United Arab Emirates) Al-Ittifaq	Mutual contract termination	2 January 2025	
17	FW	Jarrod Carluccio	Western Sydney Wanderers	Mutual contract termination	16 January 2025	
21	FW	Abdelelah Faisal	Central Coast Mariners	Mutual contract termination	20 January 2025	
31	FW	(South Sudan) Joel Anasmo	(South Korea) Jeonbuk Hyundai Motors	Loan	9 April 2025	

=== Contract extensions ===
No.	Name	Position	Duration	Date	Notes and references
17	Jarrod Carluccio	Winger	1 year	30 April 2024	Permanent contract following loan
25	Jaylan Pearman	Midfielder	1 year	29 May 2024	
9	David Williams	Striker	1 year	4 June 2024	
14	Riley Warland	Centre-back	1 year	4 June 2024	
20	Trent Ostler	Attacking midfielder	1 year	4 June 2024	Promoted to regular contract
28	Kaelan Majekodunmi	Central defender	2 years	4 June 2024	Promoted to regular contract
24	Andriano Lebib	Central defender	3 years	26 June 2024	Signed new 3 year pro contract replacing previous scholarship contract

== Pre-season and friendlies ==
Win Draw Loss Fixtures

16 July 2024	Armadale SC (Australia)	2–4	Perth Glory	Perth
19:00 AWST	Jacobsz 53'; Willis 63'	Report	Risdon 11'; Carluccio 32'; Williams 47'; Aoyama 61'	Stadium: Alfred Skeet Reserve; Attendance: 500+

20 August 2024	Sorrento FC (Australia)	0–3	Perth Glory	Perth
19:00 AWST		Report	Taggart 24'; Bugarija 74'; Blair 85'	Stadium: Percy Doyle Reserve; Referee: Shane Skinner

8 September 2024	Perth SC (Australia)	0–0	Perth Glory	Perth
14:00 AWST		Report		Stadium: Dorrien Gardens; Referee: Shane Skinner
Note: 45 minute game

8 September 2024	Perth Glory	3–0	(Australia) Balcatta Etna	Perth
15:00 AWST	Williams 9'; Faisal 31', 39'	Report		Stadium: Dorrien Gardens; Referee: Shane Skinner
Note: 45 minute game

25 September 2024 Gold Fields Challenge Cup	WA State Team (Western Australia)	0–1	Perth Glory	Perth
19:00		Report	Mathiang 80'	Stadium: Sam Kerr Football Centre; Referee: Niall Gillmor

29 September 2024	Perth Glory	2–3	(Australia) Newcastle Jets	Bunbury
15:00 AWST	Majekodunmi 15'; Williams 43'	Report	Ingham 10'; Šušnjar 55'; Adams 66'	Stadium: Hay Park; Attendance: 2,043; Referee: Shane Skinner

2 October 2024	Perth Glory	2–0	(Australia) Newcastle Jets	Albany
16:00 AWST	Taggart 5', 12' (pen.)	Report		Stadium: Retravision Stadium; Attendance: 2,022; Referee: Shane Skinner

== Competitions ==
=== Overall record ===
Competition	First match	Last match	Starting round	Final position	Record							
Competition	First match	Last match	Starting round	Final position	Pld	W	D	L	GF	GA	GD	Win %
A-League Men	20 October 2024	2 May 2025	Matchday 1	13th	26	4	5	17	22	56	−34	15.38
2024 Australia Cup	23 July 2024	28 August 2024	Play-offs	Round of 16	3	2	0	1	11	9	+2	66.67
2025 Australia Cup play-off	14 May 2025		Play-offs	Qualified for Round of 32	1	1	0	0	3	2	+1	100.00
Total					30	7	5	18	36	67	−31	23.33

Last updated: 13 May 2025
Source: Competitions

=== A-League Men ===
==== League table ====
Pos	Team	Pld	W	D	L	GF	GA	GD	Pts	Qualification
9	Newcastle Jets	26	8	6	12	43	44	−1	30	
10	Central Coast Mariners	26	5	11	10	29	51	−22	26	Qualification for 2025 Australia Cup play-offs
11	Wellington Phoenix (Note: Auckland FC and Wellington Phoenix cannot qualify for Asian Football Confederation competitions as they are based in New Zealand, which is part of the Oceania Football Confederation.)	26	6	6	14	27	43	−16	24	Qualification for 2025 Australia Cup play-offs
12	Brisbane Roar	26	5	6	15	32	51	−19	21	Qualification for 2025 Australia Cup play-offs
13	Perth Glory	26	4	5	17	22	56	−34	17	Qualification for 2025 Australia Cup play-offs

Source: A-Leagues
Rules for classification: 1) points; 2) goal difference; 3) goals scored; 4) wins; 5) head-to-head results; 5a) head-to-head points; 5b) head-to-head goal difference; 6) Fair Play points; 7) away goal difference; 8) away goals per match; 9) home goal difference; 10) home goals per match; 11) toss of a coin in an event of a tie of two clubs.

==== Results summary ====
Overall								Home						Away					
Pld	W	D	L	GF	GA	GD	Pts	W	D	L	GF	GA	GD	W	D	L	GF	GA	GD
26	4	5	17	22	56	−34	17	2	2	9	11	29	−18	2	3	8	11	27	−16

Last updated: 4 May 2025.
Source: Ultimate A-League
Home figures include Perth Glory's 3–1 loss on neutral ground in Unite Round against Western United on 22 November 2024.

==== Results by round ====
Round	1	2	3	4	5	6	7	8	9	10	12	11	13	14	15	16	17	18	19	20	21	22	23	24	25	26	27	28	29
Ground	A	H	A	H	N	A	A	H	A	H	H	A	H	H	B	A	H	H	A	H	A	B	H	A	A	H	B	A	A
Result	L	L	D	L	L	D	L	L	W	L	L	L	W	L	X	D	L	D	L	D	L	X	L	L	L	W	X	L	W
Position	13	13	12	12	12	12	12	13	12	12	12	12	12	12	12	12	12	12	12	12	12	12	13	13	13	12	13	13	13
Points	0	0	1	1	1	2	2	2	5	5	5	5	8	8	8	9	9	10	10	11	11	11	11	11	11	14	14	14	17

Updated to match(es) played on 4 May 2025. Source: Ultimate A-League
A = Away; H = Home; N = Neutral; B = Bye; W = Win; D = Draw; L = Loss; X = Bye

==== Matches ====
Win Draw Loss Fixtures

20 October 2024 1	Macarthur FC	6–1	Perth Glory	Sydney
16:00 AEDT	Drew 7'; Hollman 10'; Uskok 21'; Jakoliš 30', 45+1'; Germain 61'	Report	Bugarija 73'	Stadium: Campbelltown Sports Stadium; Attendance: 4,002; Referee: Ben Abraham

26 October 2024 2	Perth Glory	0–2	Wellington Phoenix	Perth
18:45 AWST		Report	Wootton 39'; Payne 49'	Stadium: HBF Park; Attendance: 7,074; Referee: Lachlan Keevers

2 November 2024 3	Central Coast Mariners	0–0	Perth Glory	Gosford
17:00 AEDT		Report		Stadium: Industree Group Stadium; Attendance: 7,718; Referee: Nathan Shakespear

10 November 2024 4	Perth Glory	0–5	Melbourne City	Perth
17:45 AWST		Report	Ugarkovic 39', 44'; Kuen 46'; Cohen 83'; Memeti 88'	Stadium: HBF Park; Attendance: 7,338; Referee: Daniel Cook

22 November 2024 5	Perth Glory	1–3	Western United	Sydney
17:30 AEDT	Ostler 52'	Report	Leonard 60'; Ibusuki 65', 76'	Stadium: Allianz Stadium; Attendance: 2,425; Referee: Alireza Faghani

29 November 2024 6	Adelaide United	2–2	Perth Glory	Adelaide
19:05 ACDT	Clough 49'; Vriends 50'	Report	Taggart 45+3', 61'	Stadium: Coopers Stadium; Attendance: 8,443; Referee: Shaun Evans

8 December 2024 7	Melbourne Victory	2–0	Perth Glory	Melbourne
17:00 AEDT	Machach 7'; Traoré 59'	Report		Stadium: AAMI Park; Attendance: 9,742; Referee: Shane Skinner

14 December 2024 8	Perth Glory	0–4	Newcastle Jets	Perth
18:45 AWST		Report	Aquilina 8'; Bayliss 21'; Gibson 26', 46'	Stadium: HBF Park; Attendance: 5,459; Referee: Lachlan Keevers

21 December 2024 9	Brisbane Roar	0–1	Perth Glory	Brisbane
16:00 AEST		Report	Williams 69'	Stadium: Suncorp Stadium; Attendance: 6,145; Referee: Nathan Shakespear

27 December 2024 10	Perth Glory	0–3	Macarthur FC	Perth
19:45 AWST		Report	Drew 27', 33'; Piol 73'	Stadium: HBF Park; Attendance: 6,258; Referee: Jack Morgan

3 January 2025 12	Perth Glory	2–3	Western United	Perth
18:45 AWST	Taggart 29'; Carluccio 66'	Report	Grimaldi 32'; Russell 90+1'; Lauton 90+5'	Stadium: HBF Park; Attendance: 4,564; Referee: Ben Abraham

8 January 2025 11	Sydney FC	3–0	Perth Glory	Sydney
19:00 AEDT	Lolley 52', 70' (pen.), 88'	Report		Stadium: Allianz Stadium; Attendance: 7,634; Referee: Sam Kelly

11 January 2025 13	Perth Glory	1–0	Auckland FC	Perth
18:45 AWST	Pearman 29'	Report		Stadium: HBF Park; Attendance: 5,390; Referee: Nathan Shakespear

14 January 2025 14	Perth Glory	1–2	Western Sydney Wanderers	Perth
18:45 AWST	Taggart 48'	Report	Lebib 4' (o.g.); Sapsford 59'	Stadium: HBF Park; Attendance: 5,147; Referee: Shane Skinner

25 January 2025 16	Newcastle Jets	2–2	Perth Glory	Newcastle
17:00 AEDT	Adams 11'; Taylor 78'	Report	Taggart 37' (pen.); Wales 84'	Stadium: McDonald Jones Stadium; Attendance: 6,354; Referee: Ben Abraham

1 February 2025 17	Perth Glory	0–2	Melbourne Victory	Perth
18:45 AWST		Report	Velupillay 61'; Santos 66'	Stadium: HBF Park; Attendance: 11,035; Referee: Daniel Cook

7 February 2025 18	Perth Glory	1–1	Central Coast Mariners	Perth
18:45 AWST	Taggart 8'	Report	Eames 61'	Stadium: HBF Park; Attendance: 5,139; Referee: Adam Kersey

15 February 2025 19	Melbourne City	1–0	Perth Glory	Melbourne
17:00 AEDT	Wong 37'	Report		Stadium: AAMI Park; Attendance: 4,411; Referee: Nathan Shakespear

22 February 2025 20	Perth Glory	0–0	Sydney FC	Perth
18:45 AWST		Report		Stadium: HBF Park; Attendance: 6,889; Referee: Daniel Elder

2 March 2025 21	Western Sydney Wanderers	4–1	Perth Glory	Sydney
17:00 AEDT	Hammond 14', 39'; Priestman 50'; Kraev 66'	Report	Taggart 5'	Stadium: CommBank Stadium; Attendance: 7,359; Referee: Lachlan Keevers

15 March 2025 23	Perth Glory	1–3	Brisbane Roar	Perth
18:45 AWST	Amos 7'	Report	Abubakar 37'; Klein 51', 89'	Stadium: HBF Park; Attendance: 6,469; Referee: Casey Reibelt

30 March 2025 24	Central Coast Mariners	3–1	Perth Glory	Gosford
15:00 AEDT	Kuol 5'; Doka 21' (pen.); Theoharous 58'	Report	Pennington 10'	Stadium: Industree Group Stadium; Attendance: 4,639; Referee: Jonathan Barreiro

5 April 2025 25	Western United	3–1	Perth Glory	Melbourne
18:00 AEDT	Bozinovski 3'; Gomulka 65' (o.g.); Najjarine 86'	Report	Pearman 55'	Stadium: Ironbark Fields; Attendance: 3,781; Referee: Shane Skinner

12 April 2025 26	Perth Glory	4–1	Adelaide United	Perth
19:45 AWST	Taggart 11'; Ostler 19'; Pearman 73', 80'	Report	Folami 24'	Stadium: HBF Park; Attendance: 5,986; Referee: Sam Kelly

27 April 2025 28	Auckland FC	1–0	Perth Glory	Auckland
17:00 NZDT	Francois 62'	Report		Stadium: Go Media Stadium; Attendance: 24,221; Referee: Adam Kersey

2 May 2025 29	Wellington Phoenix	0–2	Perth Glory	Wellington
19:30 NZDT		Report	Taggart 34', 90+2'	Stadium: Sky Stadium; Attendance: 4,190; Referee: Declan Woods

=== Australia Cup ===
The playoff and subsequent rounds for the 2024 Australia Cup were held during the pre-season.

23 July 2024 Play-offs	Brisbane Roar	2–4	Perth Glory	Darwin
19:00 ACST	Jelacic 17'; Zimarino 90+3'	Report	Williams 38'; Faisal 52' (pen.), 58'; Blair 65'	Stadium: Larrakia Park; Referee: Ben Abraham

3 August 2024 Round of 32	Perth Glory	5–4 (a.e.t.)	Melbourne City	Perth
19:30 AWST	Faisal 3'; Taggart 47'; Blair 74', 115'; Bugarija 88'	Report	Caputo 36'; Politidis 52'; Nabbout 64'; Schreiber 69'	Stadium: Sam Kerr Football Centre; Attendance: 2,050; Referee: Alireza Faghani

28 August 2024 Round of 16	Moreton City Excelsior	3–2	Perth Glory	Brisbane
19:30 AEST	Walters 14'; Holliday 31'; Scott 85'	Report	Lisolajski 2'; Muir 10'	Stadium: Perry Park; Attendance: 1,490; Referee: Adam Kersey

The playoff round for the 2025 Australia Cup will be held just after the regular season.

13 May 2025 Play-offs	Central Coast Mariners	2–3 (a.e.t.)	Perth Glory	Darwin
19:00 ACST	Majekodunmi 40' (o.g.); Kuol 44'	Report	Pearman 59'; Taggart 65'; Bugarija 98'	Stadium: Larrakia Park; Attendance: 1,496; Referee: Lachlan Keevers

== Statistics ==
=== Appearances and goals ===
Includes all competitions. Players with no appearances not included in the list.

As of match played 13 May 2025

No.	Pos.	Nat.	Name	A-League Men		2024 Australia Cup		2025 Australia Cup play-off		Total	
No.	Pos.	Nat.	Name	Apps	Goals	Apps	Goals	Apps	Goals	Apps	Goals
1	GK	(New Zealand)	Oliver Sail	20	0	3	0	1	0	24	0
2	DF	(Australia)	Riley Warland	4	0	0	0	0	0	4	0
3	DF	(Belgium)	Anas Hamzaoui	5+5	0	0	0	0	0	10	0
4	DF	(Australia)	Tass Mourdoukoutas	8	0	0	0	0+1	0	9	0
5	DF	(Australia)	Lachlan Barr	6+1	0	2	0	0	0	9	0
6	MF	(Australia)	Brandon O'Neill	5+12	0	3	0	0+1	0	21	0
7	MF	(Australia)	Nicholas Pennington	19+2	1	0	0	0	0	21	1
8	FW	(Australia)	Lachlan Wales	5+2	1	0	0	0	0	7	1
9	FW	(Australia)	David Williams	3+3	1	2+1	1	0	0	9	2
10	FW	(Australia)	Nikola Mileusnic	9+5	0	0	0	1	0	15	0
11	MF	(Japan)	Hiroaki Aoyama	4+1	0	0	0	0	0	5	0
12	MF	(Australia)	Taras Gomulka	17+5	0	3	0	0	0	25	0
13	GK	(Australia)	Cameron Cook	6	0	0	0	0	0	6	0
14	FW	(Australia)	Nathanael Blair	0+14	0	0+3	3	0+1	0	18	3
15	DF	(Australia)	Zach Lisolajski	9+4	0	2	1	0	0	15	1
16	MF	(Australia)	Adam Bugarija	5+9	1	1+1	1	0+1	1	17	3
17	DF	(Japan)	Yuto Misao	8+4	0	0	0	1	0	13	0
19	DF	(Australia)	Josh Risdon	15+3	0	3	0	0	0	21	0
20	MF	(Australia)	Trent Ostler	19+2	2	0	0	1	0	22	2
21	MF	(England)	Luke Amos	8	1	0	0	1	0	9	1
22	FW	(Australia)	Adam Taggart	25	10	1+1	1	1	1	28	12
23	FW	(Australia)	Patrick Wood	6+3	0	0	0	0	0	9	0
24	DF	(Australia)	Andriano Lebib	7	0	0	0	0	0	7	0
25	MF	(Australia)	Jaylan Pearman	12	4	0+1	0	1	1	14	5
26	FW	(Vietnam)	Khoa Ngo	6+12	0	1+2	0	0+1	0	22	0
27	MF	(Australia)	Will Freney	7+4	0	0	0	1	0	12	0
28	DF	(Australia)	Kaelan Majekodunmi	4+1	0	3	0	1	0	9	0
29	DF	(Australia)	Tomislav Mrcela	19	0	0	0	1	0	20	0
35	FW	(Australia)	Sebastian Despotovski	0+1	0	0	0	0	0	1	0
36	DF	(Japan)	Takuya Okamoto	4+2	0	0	0	1	0	7	0
41	MF	(Australia)	Royie Rahamim	0	0	0+1	0	0	0	1	0
Player(s) transferred out but featured this season
4	DF	(Australia)	Luke Bodnar	1	0	2+1	0	0	0	4	0
17	FW	(Australia)	Jarrod Carluccio	6+6	1	3	0	0	0	15	1
21	FW	(Australia)	Abdelelah Faisal	5+5	0	3	3	0	0	13	3
23	FW	(Colombia)	Cristian Caicedo	1+2	0	0	0	0	0	3	0
29	DF	(Australia)	Jacob Muir	0	0	1+2	1	0	0	3	1
31	FW	(South Sudan)	Joel Anasmo	0+11	0	0	0	0	0	11	0
33	DF	(Ecuador)	Luis Cangá	8	0	0	0	0	0	8	0

=== Disciplinary record ===
Includes all competitions. The list is sorted by squad number when total cards are equal. Players with no cards not included in the list.

As of match played 13 May 2025

Rank	No.	Pos.	Nat.	Name	A-League Men			2024 Australia Cup			2025 Australia Cup play-off			Total							
Rank	No.	Pos.	Nat.	Name	Booked	(yellow card) (yellow-red card)	Sent off (straight red)	Booked	(yellow card) (yellow-red card)	Sent off (straight red)	Booked	(yellow card) (yellow-red card)	Sent off (straight red)	Booked	(yellow card) (yellow-red card)	Sent off (straight red)					
Rank	No.	Pos.	Nat.	Name	1	16	MF	(Australia)	Adam Bugarija	0	0	0	0	1	0	0	0	0	0	1	0
2	7	MF	(Australia)	Nicholas Pennington	6	0	0	0	0	0	0	0	0	6	0	0					
2	19	DF	(Australia)	Josh Risdon	5	0	0	0	0	0	0	0	0	5	0	0					
4	24	DF	(Australia)	Andriano Lebib	4	0	0	0	0	0	0	0	0	4	0	0					
4	28	DF	(Australia)	Kaelan Majekodunmi	1	0	0	1	0	0	1	0	0	3	0	0					
6	1	GK	(New Zealand)	Oliver Sail	2	0	0	0	0	0	0	0	0	2	0	0					
6	2	DF	(Australia)	Riley Warland	2	0	0	0	0	0	0	0	0	2	0	0					
6	6	MF	(Australia)	Brandon O'Neill	0	0	0	1	0	0	1	0	0	2	0	0					
6	12	MF	(Australia)	Taras Gomulka	2	0	0	0	0	0	0	0	0	2	0	0					
6	15	DF	(Australia)	Zach Lisolajski	2	0	0	0	0	0	0	0	0	2	0	0					
6	21	MF	(England)	Luke Amos	2	0	0	0	0	0	0	0	0	2	0	0					
6	22	FW	(Australia)	Adam Taggart	2	0	0	0	0	0	0	0	0	2	0	0					
6	26	FW	(Vietnam)	Khoa Ngo	1	0	0	1	0	0	0	0	0	2	0	0					
6	29	DF	(Australia)	Tomislav Mrčela	2	0	0	0	0	0	0	0	0	2	0	0					
15	3	DF	(Belgium)	Anas Hamzaoui	1	0	0	0	0	0	0	0	0	1	0	0					
15	9	FW	(Australia)	David Williams	0	0	0	1	0	0	0	0	0	1	0	0					
15	10	FW	(Australia)	Nikola Mileusnic	1	0	0	0	0	0	0	0	0	1	0	0					
15	17	DF	(Japan)	Yuto Misao	1	0	0	0	0	0	0	0	0	1	0	0					
15	20	MF	(Australia)	Trent Ostler	0	0	0	0	0	0	1	0	0	1	0	0					
15	23	FW	(Australia)	Patrick Wood	1	0	0	0	0	0	0	0	0	1	0	0					
15	27	MF	(Australia)	Will Freney	1	0	0	0	0	0	0	0	0	1	0	0					
Player(s) transferred out but featured this season
1	17	FW	(Australia)	Jarrod Carluccio	4	0	0	1	0	0	0	0	0	5	0	0					
2	21	FW	(Australia)	Abdelelah Faisal	2	0	0	2	0	0	0	0	0	4	0	0					
3	33	DF	(Ecuador)	Luis Cangá	1	0	0	0	0	0	0	0	0	1	0	0					
Total					43	0	0	7	1	0	3	0	0	53	1	0					

=== Clean sheets ===
Includes all competitions. The list is sorted by squad number when total clean sheets are equal. Numbers in parentheses represent games where both goalkeepers participated and both kept a clean sheet; the number in parentheses is awarded to the goalkeeper who was substituted on, whilst a full clean sheet is awarded to the goalkeeper who was on the field at the start of play. Goalkeepers with no clean sheets not included in the list.

As of match played 13 May 2025

Rank	No.	Nat.	Goalkeeper	A-League Men	2024 Australia Cup	2025 Australia Cup play-off	Total
1	1	(New Zealand)	Oliver Sail	4	0	0	4
2	13	(Australia)	Cameron Cook	1	0	0	1
Total				5	0	0	5
