= 2026–27 Perth Glory FC season =

Perth Glory
2026–27 season
- Owner: Pelligra Group
- Chairman: Ross Pelligra
- Head coach: Adam Griffiths
- Stadium: HBF Park
- A-League Men: 5th
- 2026 Australia Cup: Round of 32
- Top goalscorer: League: Jaiden Kucharski (3 goals); All: Jaiden Kucharski (3 goals)
- Highest home attendance: 7,670 vs. Adelaide United; 1 November 2026; A-League Men
- Lowest home attendance: 7,642 vs. Newcastle Jets; 7 November 2026; A-League Men
- Average home league attendance: 7,656
- Biggest win: 4–0 vs. Adelaide United (H) (1 November 2026); A-League Men
- Biggest defeat: 1–2 vs. Macarthur FC (A) (17 October 2026); A-League Men; 1–2 vs. Brisbane Roar (A) (23 October 2026); A-League Men
Home colours	Away colours
- All statistics correct as of 21 November 2026.

The 2026–27 season is Perth Glory Football Club's 22nd season in the A-League Men, and their 30th season in the top flight of Australian soccer. In addition to the domestic league, Perth Glory will participate in this season's edition of the Australia Cup.

== Players ==
Note: Flags indicate national team as defined under FIFA eligibility rules; some limited exceptions apply. Players may hold more than one non-FIFA nationality.

No.	Pos.	Nation	Player
1	GK	AUS	Matt Sutton
2	DF	IRQ	Charbel Shamoon
3	DF	NZL	Sam Sutton
5	DF	AUS	Lachlan Jackson
6	MF	AUS	Brandon O'Neill
7	FW	MKD	Stefan Colakovski
8	MF	IRL	Jay O'Shea
9	FW	AUS	Jaiden Kucharski
10	FW	WAL	Tom Lawrence (captain)
11	FW	AUS	Sebastian Kukucka
12	DF	AUS	Matthew Dench
13	MF	AUS	Henry Hore
16	MF	MLT	Lucas Scicluna
17	FW	AUS	Pieter Jacobsz
18	DF	AUS	Cher Deng

No.	Pos.	Nation	Player
20	MF	AUS	Trent Ostler
21	FW	NZL	Matt Ellis
23	MF	AUS	Anthony Didulica (scholarship)
24	DF	AUS	Andriano Lebib
25	MF	AUS	Sebastian Despotovski
27	MF	AUS	Will Freney
28	MF	AUS	Calem Nieuwenhof (on loan from Heart of Midlothian)
29	GK	AUS	Daniel Solsky
30	DF	AUS	Tadiwanashe Kuzamba (scholarship)
36	MF	AUS	Oliver Evans (scholarship)
39	MF	AUS	Giovanni de Abreu
40	GK	AUS	Ryan Warner
44	DF	AUS	Riley Foxe (scholarship)
45	DF	VAN	Brian Kaltak

== Transfers and contracts ==
=== Transfers in ===
No.	Position	Name	From	Type/fee	Contract length	Date	Ref.
28	DF	Kaelan Majekodunmi	(Australia) Dandenong Thunder	End of loan		5 June 2026	
26	FW	(Vietnam) Khoa Ngo	(Vietnam) Cong An Ho Chi Minh City	End of loan		1 July 2026	
12	DF	Matthew Dench	Brisbane Roar	Free transfer	2 years	1 July 2026	
16	MF	(Malta) Lucas Scicluna	Newcastle Jets	Free transfer	2 years	1 July 2026	
28	MF	Calem Nieuwenhof	(Scotland) Heart of Midlothian	Loan	1 year	1 July 2026	
13	MF	Henry Hore	Brisbane Roar	Free transfer	2 years	1 July 2026	
5	DF	Lachlan Jackson	Unattached	Free transfer	2 years	8 July 2026	
29	GK	Daniel Solsky	(Australia) Wollongong Wolves	Free transfer	1 year	10 July 2026	
18	DF	Cher Deng	(Australia) Lions FC	Free transfer	2 years	2 September 2026	
21	FW	(New Zealand) Matt Ellis	(New Zealand) Auckland City	Free transfer	1 year	17 September 2026	
17	FW	Pieter Jacobsz	(Australia) Perth Azzurri	Free transfer	1 year	17 September 2026	
11	FW	Sebastian Kukucka	(Australia) Sydney Olympic	Free transfer		17 September 2026	
6	MF	Brandon O'Neill	(Australia) Perth RedStar	End of loan		17 September 2026	
8	MF	(Republic of Ireland) Jay O'Shea	Unattached	Free transfer	1 year	22 October 2026	

==== From youth squad ====
N	Pos.	Nat.	Name	Age	Notes

=== Transfers out ===
No.	Position	Name	To	Type/fee	Date	Ref.
19	DF	Josh Risdon	Retired		25 April 2026	
1	GK	Mark Birighitti	Unattached	Mutual contract termination	9 June 2026	
6	MF	Brandon O'Neill	(Australia) Perth RedStar	Loan	24 June 2026	
28	DF	Kaelan Majekodunmi	(Australia) Olympic Kingsway	End of contract	24 June 2026	
15	DF	Zach Lisolajski	(Australia) Preston Lions	End of contract	25 June 2026	
18	MF	Luca Tevere	(Australia) Preston Lions	End of contract	25 June 2026	
7	MF	Nicholas Pennington	Unattached	End of contract	30 June 2026	
11	FW	Lachlan Wales	Unattached	End of contract	30 June 2026	
13	GK	Cameron Cook	Unattached	End of contract	30 June 2026	
16	FW	Gabriel Popovic	Sydney FC	End of contract	30 June 2026	
31	FW	(South Sudan) Joel Anasmo	Unattached	End of contract	30 June 2026	
8	MF	(England) Callum Timmins	(Cambodia) Phnom Penh Crown	Loan	4 July 2026	
26	FW	(Vietnam) Khoa Ngo	(Vietnam) Cong An Ho Chi Minh City	Free transfer	12 August 2026	
22	FW	Adam Taggart	(Vietnam) Hanoi FC	Mutual contract termination	28 August 2026	
4	DF	(England) Scott Wootton	Retired		10 September 2026	
17	FW	Arion Sulemani	(Australia) Oakleigh Cannons	Mutual contract termination	16 September 2026	

=== Contract extensions ===
No.	Name	Position	Duration	Date	Notes and references
39	Giovanni de Abreu	Central midfielder	2 years	19 May 2026	
7	(North Macedonia) Stefan Colakovski	Striker	1 year	22 May 2026	
25	Sebastian Despotovski	Attacking midfielder	2 years	26 May 2026	Contract extended from end of 2026–27 to end of 2027–28
22	Adam Taggart	Striker	1 year	29 May 2026	
10	(Wales) Tom Lawrence	Attacking midfielder	2 years	3 June 2026	
27	Will Freney	Central midfielder	2 years	10 June 2026	Contract extended from end of 2026–27 to end of 2027–28
9	Jaiden Kucharski	Striker	3 years	11 June 2026	Replaces previous contract which ran until the end of 2026–27
2	(Iraq) Charbel Shamoon	Right-back	2 years	15 June 2026	Contract extended from end of 2026–27 to end of 2027–28
40	Ryan Warner	Goalkeeper	2 years	15 July 2026	
30	Tadiwanashe Kuzamba	Right-back	2 years	16 October 2026	Contract extended from end of 2026–27 to end of 2028–29

== Pre-season and friendlies ==
11 July 2026	Perth Azzurri (Australia)	0–6	(Australia) Perth Glory	Perth
11:00 AWST		Report	Despotovski; Taggart; Freney; De Abreu; Didulica	Stadium: Dorrien Gardens; Attendance: 0 (behind closed doors)

19 September 2026	Melbourne City (Australia)	1–1	(Australia) Perth Glory	Melbourne, Australia
	Memeti	Report (City); Report (Glory)	Wong (o.g.)	Stadium: Casey Fields; Attendance: 0 (behind closed doors)

27 September 2026 2026 Regional Tour	Perth Glory (Australia)	2–0	(Australia) Adelaide United	Bunbury
12:00 AWST	Despotovski 46'; Scicluna 54'	Report		Stadium: Hay Park; Attendance: 1,136; Referee: Finn Johnson

3 October 2026 2026 Regional Tour	Perth Glory (Australia)	1–3	(Australia) Adelaide United	Northam
14:00 AWST	Kuzamba 63'	Report	Crawford 3'; Burkitt 53'; Riak 64'	Stadium: Henry Street Oval; Attendance: 1,008; Referee: Finn Johnson

10 October 2026 Challenge Cup	WA State Team (Western Australia)	0–2	Perth Glory	Perth
19:00		Report	Lawrence 34'; Kuzamba 75'	Stadium: Kingsway Reserve; Referee: Finn Johnson

== Competitions ==
=== Overall record ===
Competition	First match	Last match	Starting round	Final position	Record							
Competition	First match	Last match	Starting round	Final position	Pld	W	D	L	GF	GA	GD	Win %
A-League Men	17 October 2026	7 May 2027	Matchday 1		5	2	1	2	8	5	+3	40.00
Australia Cup	21 July 2026	21 July 2026	Round of 32	Round of 32	1	0	1	0	1	1	+0	0.00
Total					6	2	2	2	9	6	+3	33.33

Last updated: 21 November 2026
Source: Competitions

=== A-League Men ===
==== League table ====
Pos	Team	Pld	W	D	L	GF	GA	GD	Pts	Qualification
3	Sydney FC	5	2	2	1	7	4	+3	8	Qualification for the AFC Champions League Elite preliminary stage and the finals series (Note: The top two teams enter the finals series at the semi-finals, while the teams ranked third to sixth enter the finals series at the elimination-finals.)
4	Brisbane Roar	4	2	2	0	5	3	+2	8	Qualification for the finals series
5	Perth Glory	5	2	1	2	8	5	+3	7	Qualification for the finals series
6	Melbourne City	4	2	1	1	6	6	0	7	Qualification for the finals series
7	Auckland FC (Note: Auckland FC and Wellington Phoenix cannot qualify for Asian Football Confederation competitions as they are based in New Zealand, which is part of the Oceania Football Confederation.)	5	1	3	1	7	8	−1	6	

Updated to match(es) played on 21 November 2026. Source: A-Leagues
Rules for classification: 1) points; 2) goal difference; 3) goals scored; 4) wins; 5) head-to-head results; 5a) head-to-head points; 5b) head-to-head goal difference; 6) Fair Play points; 7) away goal difference; 8) away goals per match; 9) home goal difference; 10) home goals per match; 11) toss of a coin in an event of a tie of two clubs.

==== Results summary ====
Overall								Home						Away					
Pld	W	D	L	GF	GA	GD	Pts	W	D	L	GF	GA	GD	W	D	L	GF	GA	GD
4	1	1	2	8	5	+3	4	1	0	0	6	1	+5	0	1	2	2	4	−2

Last updated: 21 November 2026.

==== Results by round ====
Round	1	2	3	4	5	6	7	8	9	10	11	12	13	14	15	16	17	18	19	20	21	22	23	24	25	26	27	28
Ground	A	A	H	H	A	B	A	H	A	A	A	H	H	A	A	A	B	H	H	A	H	A	H	H	A	H	H	H
Result	L	L	W	W	D	X											X											
Position	10	12	8	5	6																							
Points	0	0	3	6	7																							

Updated to match(es) played on 21 November 2026. Source: Ultimate A-League
A = Away; H = Home; W = Win; D = Draw; L = Loss; X = Bye

==== Matches ====
Win Draw Loss Fixtures

17 October 2026 1	Macarthur FC	2–1	Perth Glory	Sydney
19:40 AEDT	Fraser 86' (pen.); Aspropotamitis 89'	Report	Lawrence 59'	Stadium: Campbelltown Sports Stadium; Attendance: 3,441; Referee: Shaun Evans

23 October 2026 2	Brisbane Roar	2–1	Perth Glory	Brisbane
19:00 AEST	Vidic 28'; Nam 42'	Report	Ellis 60'	Stadium: Suncorp Stadium; Attendance: 6,497; Referee: Alireza Faghani

1 November 2026 3	Perth Glory	4–0	Adelaide United	Perth
16:00 AWST	Kucharski 16'; Kuzamba 20'; Colakovski 33'; Ellis 85'	Report		Stadium: HBF Park; Attendance: 7,670; Referee: Tom Dale

7 November 2026 4	Perth Glory	2–1	Newcastle Jets	Perth
18:45 AWST	Kucharski 39', 48'	Report	Vergos 90+2'	Stadium: HBF Park; Attendance: 7,642; Referee: Sam Kelly

21 November 2026 5	Central Coast Mariners	0–0	Perth Glory	Gosford
15:00 AEDT		Report		Stadium: Polytec Stadium; Attendance: 4,921; Referee: Shaun Evans

5 December 2026 7	Western Sydney Wanderers	v	Perth Glory	Sydney
19:40 AEDT		Source		Stadium: CommBank Stadium

11 December 2026 8	Perth Glory	v	Melbourne City	Perth
21:45 AEDT		Report		Stadium: HBF Park

18 December 2026 9	Sydney FC	v	Perth Glory	Sydney
17:40 AEDT		Report		Stadium: Allianz Stadium

30 December 2026 10	Brisbane Roar	v	Perth Glory	Brisbane
17:40 AEST		Report		Stadium: Kayo Stadium

3 January 2027 11	Melbourne Victory	v	Perth Glory	Melbourne
17:00 AEST				Stadium: AAMI Park

8 January 2027 12	Perth Glory	v	Macarthur FC	Perth
18:45 AWST		Report		Stadium: HBF Park

16 January 2027 13	Perth Glory	v	Central Coast Mariners	Perth
18:45 AWST		Report		Stadium: HBF Park

24 January 2027 14	Auckland FC	v	Perth Glory	Auckland
15:00 NZDT		Report		Stadium: Go Media Stadium

30 January 2027 15	Wellington Phoenix	v	Perth Glory	Wellington
17:00 NZDT				Stadium: Hnry Stadium

5 February 2027 16	Newcastle Jets	v	Perth Glory	Newcastle
19:40 AEDT		Report		Stadium: McDonald Jones Stadium

20 February 2027 18	Perth Glory	v	Sydney FC	Perth
17:00 AWST		Report		Stadium: HBF Park

27 February 2027 19	Perth Glory	v	Brisbane Roar	Perth
18:45 AWST		Report		Stadium: HBF Park

5 March 2027 20	Adelaide United	v	Perth Glory	Adelaide
19:10 ACDT		Source		Stadium: Coopers Stadium

14 March 2027 21	Perth Glory	v	Melbourne Victory	Perth
19:00 AWST				Stadium: HBF Park

19 March 2027 22	Central Coast Mariners	v	Perth Glory	Gosford
19:40 AEDT		Report		Stadium: polytec Stadium

3 April 2027 23	Perth Glory	v	Brisbane Roar	Perth
18:45 AWST		Report		Stadium: HBF Park

10 April 2027 24	Perth Glory	v	Auckland FC	Perth
19:45 AWST		Report		Stadium: HBF Park

16 April 2027 25	Melbourne City	v	Perth Glory	Melbourne
19:40 AWST		Report		Stadium: AAMI Park

24 April 2027 26	Perth Glory	v	Western Sydney Wanderers	Perth
19:45 AWST		Source		Stadium: HBF Park

30 April 2027 27	Perth Glory	v	Wellington Phoenix	Perth
19:45 AWST				Stadium: HBF Park

7 May 2027 28	Perth Glory	v	Adelaide United	Perth
19:45 AWST		Source		Stadium: HBF Park

=== Australia Cup ===
21 July 2026 Round of 32	Lions FC	1–1 (a.e.t.) (4–2 p)	Perth Glory	Brisbane
19:30 AEST	Lagos 95'	Report	Lebib 114'	Stadium: Spencer Park; Attendance: 1,000; Referee: Tom Fell
	Penalties
	Carlos (penalty scored); Lagos (penalty scored); Beakhurst (penalty scored); Jarrard (penalty scored)		(penalty scored) Colakovski; (penalty missed) Despotovski; (penalty missed) Sulemani; (penalty scored) S. Sutton

== Statistics ==
=== Appearances and goals ===
Includes all competitions. Players with no appearances not included in the list.

As of 21 November 2026

No.	Pos.	Nat.	Name	A-League Men		2026 Australia Cup		Total	
No.	Pos.	Nat.	Name	Apps	Goals	Apps	Goals	Apps	Goals
1	GK	(Australia)	Matt Sutton	2	0	1	0	3	0
2	DF	(Iraq)	Charbel Shamoon	0	0	1	0	1	0
3	DF	(New Zealand)	Sam Sutton	4+1	0	0+1	0	6	0
5	DF	(Australia)	Lachlan Jackson	5	0	0+1	0	6	0
7	FW	(North Macedonia)	Stefan Colakovski	5	1	0+1	0	6	1
8	MF	(Republic of Ireland)	Jay O'Shea	0+4	0	0	0	4	0
9	FW	(Australia)	Jaiden Kucharski	3+2	3	0	0	5	3
10	MF	(Wales)	Tom Lawrence	3	1	0	0	3	1
11	FW	(Australia)	Sebastian Kukucka	0+4	0	0	0	4	0
12	DF	(Australia)	Matthew Dench	0	0	1	0	1	0
13	MF	(Australia)	Henry Hore	1	0	1	0	2	0
16	MF	(Malta)	Lucas Scicluna	5	0	1	0	6	0
17	FW	(Australia)	Pieter Jacobsz	4+1	0	0	0	5	0
18	DF	(Australia)	Cher Deng	5	0	0	0	5	0
21	FW	(New Zealand)	Matt Ellis	0+4	2	0	0	4	2
23	MF	(Australia)	Anthony Didiluca	0	0	1	0	1	0
24	DF	(Australia)	Andriano Lebib	2+1	0	1	1	4	1
25	FW	(Australia)	Sebastian Despotovski	4+1	0	1	0	6	0
27	MF	(Australia)	Will Freney	4	0	0	0	4	0
28	MF	(Australia)	Calem Nieuwenhof	0+1	0	0	0	1	0
29	GK	(Australia)	Daniel Solsky	3	0	0	0	3	0
30	DF	(Australia)	Tadiwanashe Kuzamba	5	1	0	0	5	1
35	MF	(Australia)	Oliver Evans	0	0	0+1	0	1	0
37	FW	(Australia)	Louis Sollitt	0+1	0	0	0	1	0
39	MF	(Australia)	Giovanni De Abreu	1+4	0	1	0	6	0
45	DF	(Vanuatu)	Brian Kaltak	0	0	1	0	1	0
Player(s) transferred out but featured this season
4	DF	(England)	Scott Wootton	0	0	0+1	0	1	0
17	FW	(Australia)	Arion Sulemani	0	0	0+1	0	1	0
22	FW	(Australia)	Adam Taggart	0	0	1	0	1	0

=== Disciplinary record ===
Includes all competitions. The list is sorted by squad number when total cards are equal. Players with no cards not included in the list.

As of 7 November 2026

Rank	No.	Pos.	Nat.	Name	A-League Men			2026 Australia Cup			Total															
Rank	No.	Pos.	Nat.	Name	Yellow card	(yellow card) (yellow-red card)	Red card	Yellow card	(yellow card) (yellow-red card)	Red card	Yellow card	(yellow card) (yellow-red card)	Red card													
Rank	No.	Pos.	Nat.	Name	1	24	DF	(Australia)	Andriano Lebib	1	0	0	1	0	0	2	0	0								
30	DF	(Australia)	Tadiwanashe Kuzamba	2	1	0	0	0	0	0	2	0	0													
3	7	FW	(North Macedonia)	Stefan Colakovski	1	0	0	0	0	0	1	0	0	9	FW	(Australia)	Jaiden Kucharski	1	0	0	0	0	0	1	0	0
3	13	MF	(Australia)	Henry Hore	0	0	0	1	0	0	1	0	0													
3	23	MF	(Australia)	Anthony Didiluca	0	0	0	1	0	0	1	0	0													
3	25	FW	(Australia)	Sebastian Despotovski	0	0	0	1	0	0	1	0	0													
3	39	MF	(Australia)	Giovanni De Abreu	1	0	0	0	0	0	1	0	0													
3	Player(s) transferred out but featured this season																									
Total					5	0	0	4	0	0	9	0	0													

=== Clean sheets ===
Includes all competitions. The list is sorted by squad number when total clean sheets are equal. Numbers in parentheses represent games where both goalkeepers participated and both kept a clean sheet; the number in parentheses is awarded to the goalkeeper who was substituted on, whilst a full clean sheet is awarded to the goalkeeper who was on the field at the start of play. Goalkeepers with no clean sheets not included in the list.

As of 21 November 2026

Rank	No.	Nat.	Goalkeeper	A-League Men	2026 Australia Cup	Total
1	29	(Australia)	Daniel Solsky	2	0	2
Total				2	0	2

== See also ==
- 2026–27 Perth Glory FC (women) season
