= Tom Lawrence =

Welsh footballer (born 1994)

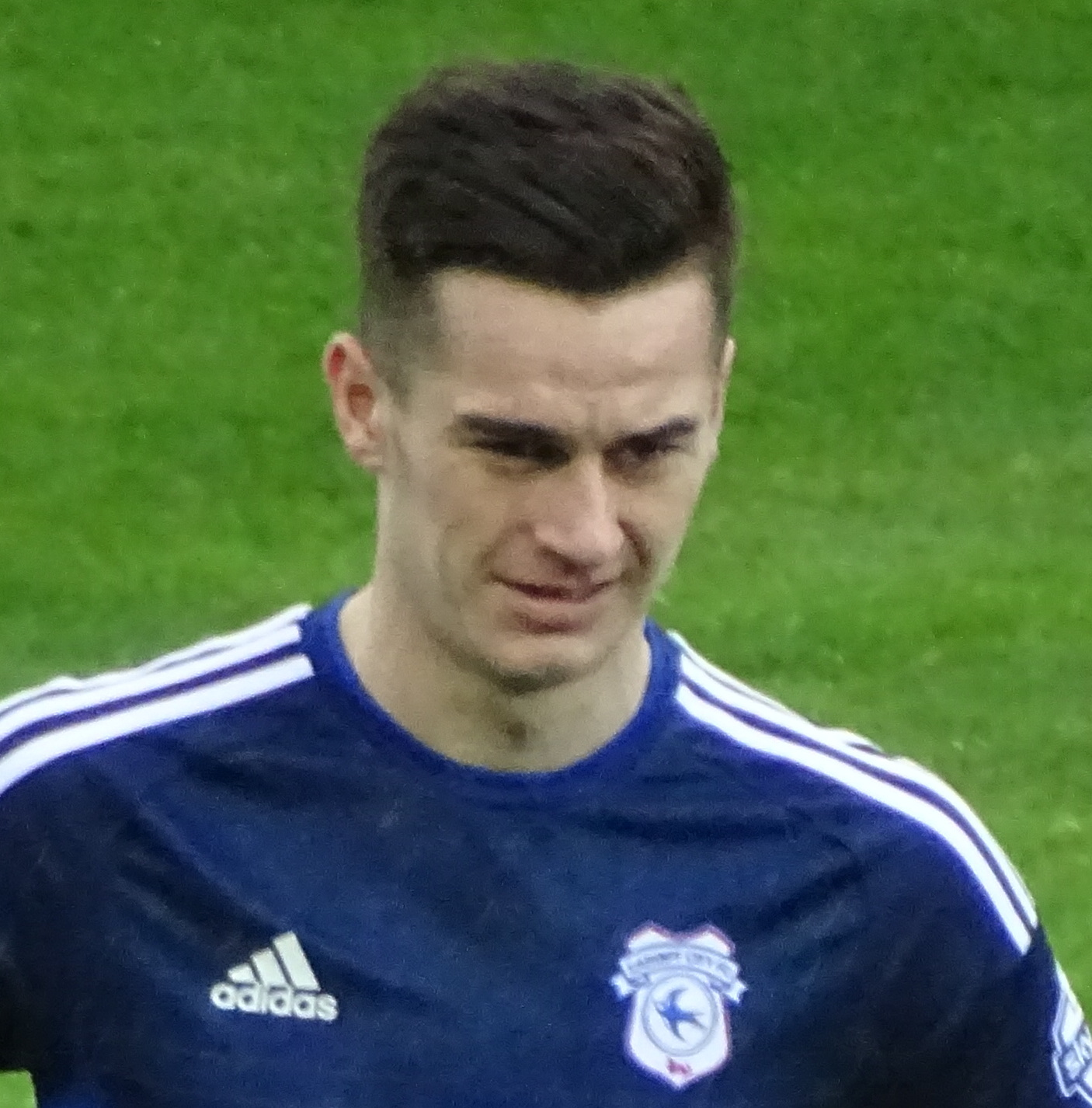
- Lawrence playing for Cardiff City in 2016

Personal information
- Full name: Thomas Morris Lawrence
- Date of birth: 13 January 1994 (age 32)
- Place of birth: Wrexham, Wales
- Height: 5 ft 11 in (1.80 m)
- Position: Midfielder

Team information
- Current team: Perth Glory
- Number: 10

Youth career
- Everton
- 2002–2013: Manchester United

Senior career*
Years	Team	Apps	(Gls)
2013–2014	Manchester United	1	(0)
2013–2014	→ Carlisle United (loan)	9	(3)
2014	→ Yeovil Town (loan)	19	(2)
2014–2017	Leicester City	3	(0)
2014	→ Rotherham United (loan)	6	(1)
2015–2016	→ Blackburn Rovers (loan)	21	(2)
2016	→ Cardiff City (loan)	14	(0)
2016–2017	→ Ipswich Town (loan)	34	(10)
2017–2022	Derby County	170	(35)
2022–2025	Rangers	46	(8)
2025–	Perth Glory	13	(5)

International career^{‡}
2010–2013	Wales U17	4	(0)
2012–2013	Wales U19	5	(0)
2013–2014	Wales U21	8	(3)
2015–2021	Wales	23	(3)
- * Club domestic league appearances and goals as of 17:10, 14 January 2025 (UTC) ‡ National team caps and goals as of 21:59, 27 March 2021 (UTC)

Thomas Morris Lawrence (/ˈlɔ(ː)ɹəns/; born 13 January 1994) is a Welsh professional footballer who plays as a midfielder for A-League Men club Perth Glory.

Born in Wrexham, he joined Manchester United at the age of eight and made his way up through the age groups, but he was unable to make it as a first-team regular and spent time on loan at Carlisle United and Yeovil Town before joining Leicester City in September 2014. After three years with Leicester, during which time he was loaned out to Rotherham United, Blackburn Rovers, Cardiff City and Ipswich Town, he left for Derby County in August 2017 and joined Rangers in 2022, where he played until 2025. He has represented Wales at senior international level, having also played for the national under-17, under-19 and under-21 sides.

== Club career ==
=== Manchester United ===
==== Youth team ====
Born in Wrexham, Lawrence grew up in Penyffordd, Flintshire, and joined Manchester United from Everton at the age of eight. Tosh Farrell, an Everton coach at the time later commented that Lawrence was a "big Man U fan so we had no chance [of keeping him] when they wanted him!" After progressing up through the age grades, he made his first appearance for the under-18s at the age of 15 in a friendly against Maltese side Hibernians in October 2009, coming on as a substitute to score the third goal in a 3–1 win. In July 2010, he appeared for the under-17s in the Milk Cup in Northern Ireland, scoring against County Down in the quarter-finals of the Slemish Trophy repechage competition. Off the back of that, he became a regular fixture in the under-18s team for the 2010–11 season, scoring five goals in 22 appearances in the Premier Academy League, as well as making three substitute appearances in the club's successful FA Youth Cup run. Towards the end of the season, he also got his first experience of the reserve team, being named as an unused substitute for the final game of the Premier Reserve League season, a 2–2 draw with Liverpool.

Another appearance at the Milk Cup followed in 2011, with Lawrence scoring the only goal in Manchester United's semi-final victory over Senegalese side Étoile Lusitana; however, the team went on to lose the final 5–1 to Qatari youth academy ASPIRE. Lawrence began the 2011–12 season in good form, scoring four goals in his first four matches before suffering an injury in the fifth, a 3–1 home defeat to Manchester City. On his return two months later, he scored the opener in Manchester United's 4–0 FA Youth Cup win over Torquay United, only to suffer another injury to his groin and miss another five months of the season. Nevertheless, he returned strongly, scoring three goals in the final three games of the season, including a brace against Stoke City on the final day. After going unused in a Manchester Senior Cup game against Bury earlier in the season, Lawrence finally made his first appearance for the reserves in the final of the Lancashire Senior Cup against Accrington Stanley; after coming on as a 23rd-minute substitute for Luke Giverin, Lawrence opened the scoring shortly before half-time and Manchester United went on to win 4–0.

After signing his first professional contract in July 2012, Lawrence made the step up to the reserves on a permanent basis for the 2012–13 season; however, he found the transition difficult, as competing with the likes of Federico Macheda, Ángelo Henríquez and Joshua King meant he often found himself on the bench, rarely making it onto the pitch with any significant time left in games. Despite a lack of playing time, Lawrence managed to score four goals in 20 appearances during the season, including one goal in a 3–1 win against Oldham Athletic in the Manchester Senior Cup, and his assist led to Larnell Cole's 88th-minute winning goal against Tottenham Hotspur in the final of the Under-21 Premier League. Will Keane's return to fitness meant Lawrence's opportunities continued to be limited going into the 2013–14 season, although he did manage to appear in seven of the team's first eight matches of the season.

==== Carlisle United loan ====
On 28 November 2013, Lawrence joined fellow Manchester United player Ben Amos at League One club Carlisle United on a month-long loan, due to last until 4 January 2014. Lawrence made his debut the following weekend, coming on as a 59th-minute substitute for Paul Thirlwell in a 3–1 defeat away to Swindon Town.

==== Yeovil Town loan ====
On 31 January 2014, Lawrence joined Football League Championship side Yeovil Town on a three-month loan. He made 17 starts and two substitute appearances for Yeovil, scoring twice, as the club were relegated to League One. On 30 April, he was recalled by Manchester United.

==== Return to Manchester United ====
On 6 May 2014, Lawrence was given his United debut by interim player-manager Ryan Giggs, starting in a 3–1 home Premier League win against Hull City. He was substituted in the 70th minute for Giggs himself.

=== Leicester City ===
Lawrence was sold to recently promoted Leicester City on 2 September 2014 for an undisclosed fee, signing a four-year contract.

Before making an appearance for Leicester, he was loaned to Championship club Rotherham United on 27 November, on a month-long deal. He scored one goal in six appearances for Rotherham before returning to Leicester. He made his Leicester debut on 3 January 2015 in an FA Cup third round tie against Newcastle United, which Leicester won 1–0.

==== Blackburn Rovers (loan) ====
On 21 August 2015, Lawrence joined Championship side Blackburn Rovers on loan until 3 January 2016.

On 5 January, his loan deal was extended until 31 January. He returned to Leicester when loan came to an end on 31 January 2016.

==== Cardiff City (loan) ====
On 1 February 2016, Lawrence joined Championship side Cardiff City on loan until the end of the 2015–16 season.

==== Ipswich Town (loan) ====
On 30 August 2016, Lawrence joined Championship side Ipswich Town on loan until the end of the 2016–17 season. Lawrence scored his first goal for Ipswich in a 2–1 win at Sheffield Wednesday on 5 November 2016.

=== Derby County ===
After three seasons with Leicester City, Lawrence left the club for Derby County on 15 August 2017, signing a "long-term" contract with the club. On 13 July 2021, Lawrence was named captain of Derby County. He left the club during the 2022 close season, following their relegation to EFL League One.

=== Rangers ===
Lawrence signed for Scottish Premiership club Rangers on 8 July 2022. He made his debut for the club in a Scottish Premiership match against Livingston in a 2-1 win on 30 July. He scored his first goal for Rangers in a Scottish Premiership win at home to St Johnstone on 13 August. Other goals came against St Johnstone and Hibernian the league and also against PSV Eindhoven in the Champions League.

During season 2023-24 Lawrence made 32 appearances for Rangers scoring 3 goals, twice against Kilmarnock and once against Benfica in the Europa League.

Lawrence scored his first goal of season 2024-25 in a home league match against Ross County. During the same match Lawrence set up his teammate Cyriel Dessers for the opening goal of the game.

Lawrence followed this up with the winning goal in the league match against Dundee United. The assist for the goal was provided by teammate Cyriel Dessers.

=== Perth Glory ===
On 10 October 2025, Lawrence joined A-League Men side Perth Glory on a one-year deal, joining fellow Manchester United academy graduate Scott Wootton at the club. He made his Glory debut in a 0–2 loss against Melbourne Victory on 31 October.

On 23 November 2025, Lawrence scored his first goal for the club in a 2–1 win over the Newcastle Jets.

Lawrence scored his first ever senior hat-trick on 28 December in a 3–1 win over Melbourne City FC.

Despite being injured for much of the 2025–26 season, Lawrence extended his contract for a further two years on 3 June, 2026.

== International career ==
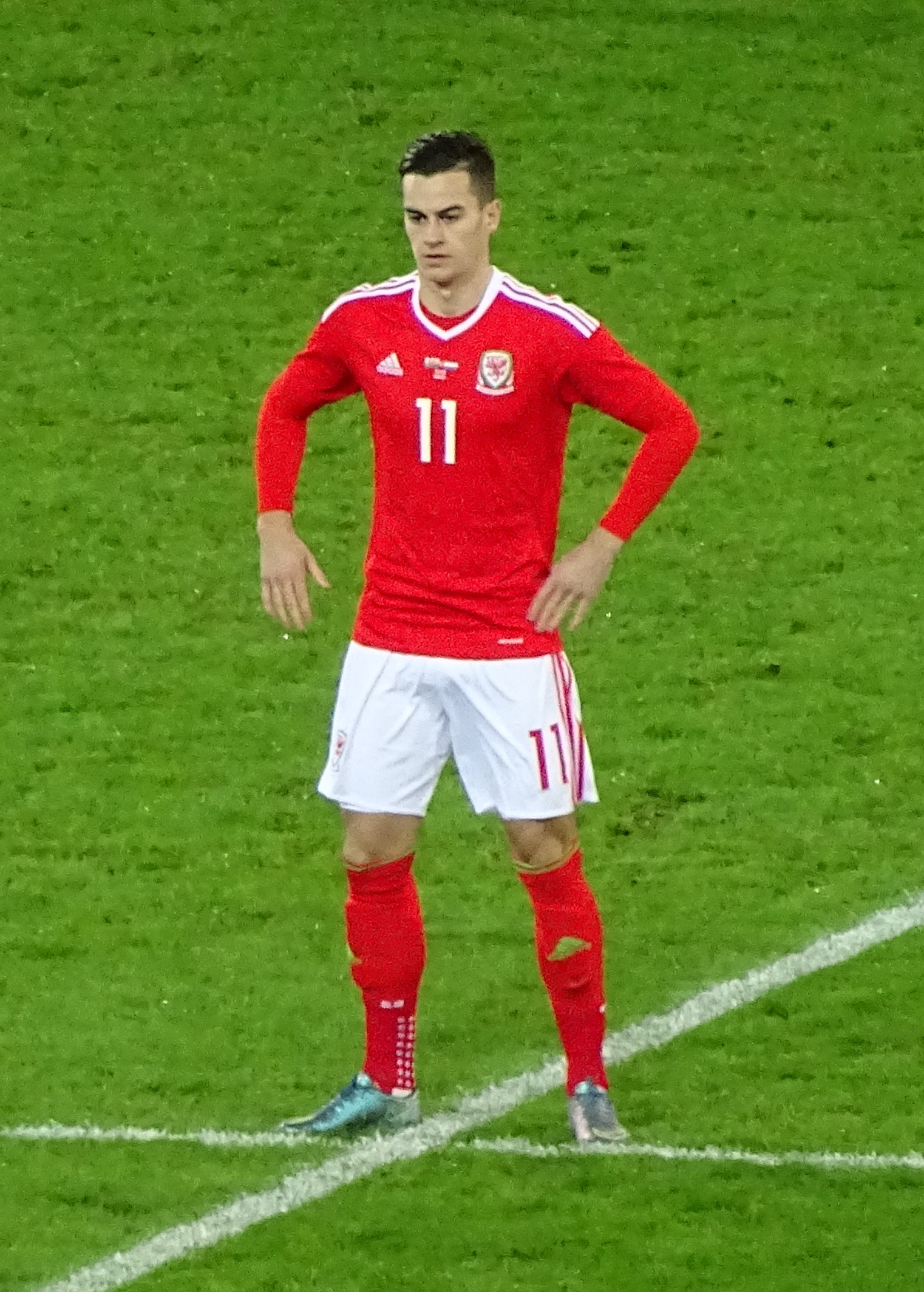
Lawrence playing for Wales in 2015

Lawrence's first experience of representative football came in 2003–04, when he played for the Flintshire Schools team while still a year young, and again in 2004–05. Both years, the team won the Tom Yeoman Shield North league titles, and in 2005, they were beaten to the national title by Swansea Schools. That year, Lawrence was named as the Flintshire Schools FA's joint player of the year, along with George Baxter of Mynydd Isa CP.

After progressing through the Wales under-17 and under-19 teams, Lawrence made his debut for the under-21s in a 3–0 home friendly victory over Iceland in February 2013, playing for 64 minutes before being substituted. He scored his first goal for the under-21s a month later, scoring the only goal in a European Championship qualifying win over Moldova at Parc y Scarlets in Llanelli. This was followed up by a brace of penalties in another qualifying win in October 2013, this time against Lithuania.

22 May 2014, Lawrence was named in the Wales senior squad for the friendly match against the Netherlands on 4 June 2014. Lawrence was named in the Wales squad for the UEFA Euro 2016 qualifying matches against Cyprus and Israel to be played on 3 and 6 September 2015. On 13 October, he came on as a substitute for David Edwards in Wales' final Euro 2016 qualifier against Andorra.

During Wales' 2018 World Cup Qualifying campaign, Lawrence made a second half appearance against Serbia on 12 November 2016, replacing Hal Robson-Kanu on 68 minutes.

Lawrence scored the decisive goal in a 1–0 win over Georgia in Tbilisi on 6 October 2017, to put Wales in touching distance of World Cup qualification.

== Personal life ==
Lawrence was arrested alongside Derby teammate Mason Bennett in September 2019 on suspicion of drink-driving. Club captain Richard Keogh was injured in the crash, and ruled out for the rest of the 2019–20 season. Derby manager Phillip Cocu said that Keogh felt responsible for the situation, and after Lawrence and Bennett both returned to Derby's team, Cocu said they were "not off the hook". Lawrence and Bennett were then both fined six weeks' wages by Derby, and ordered to serve 80 hours of community service and rehabilitation. Keogh was sacked by the club. On 15 October 2019 Lawrence and Bennett pleaded guilty to drink driving at Derby Magistrates Court.

== Career statistics ==
=== Club ===
As of match played 10 January 2026

Appearances and goals by club, season and competition
Club	Season	League			National cup (Note: Includes FA Cup, Scottish Cup, Australia Cup)		League cup (Note: Includes EFL Cup, Scottish League Cup)		Continental		Other		Total	
Club	Season	Division	Apps	Goals	Apps	Goals	Apps	Goals	Apps	Goals	Apps	Goals	Apps	Goals
Manchester United	2012–13	Premier League	0	0	0	0	0	0	—		0	0	0	0
Manchester United	2013–14	Premier League	1	0	—		0	0	—		0	0	1	0
Manchester United	Total		1	0	0	0	0	0	0	0	0	0	1	0
Carlisle United (loan)	2013–14	League One	9	3	2	0	—		—		—		11	3
Yeovil Town (loan)	2013–14	Championship	19	2	—		—		—		—		19	2
Leicester City	2014–15	Premier League	3	0	1	0	0	0	—		—		4	0
Rotherham United (loan)	2014–15	Championship	6	1	—		—		—		—		6	1
Blackburn Rovers (loan)	2015–16	Championship	21	2	2	0	0	0	—		—		23	2
Cardiff City (loan)	2015–16	Championship	14	0	—		—		—		—		14	0
Ipswich Town (loan)	2016–17	Championship	34	9	2	2	0	0	—		—		36	11
Derby County	2017–18	Championship	39	6	1	0	2	0	—		2 (Note: Appearances in EFL Championship play-offs)	0	44	6
Derby County	2018–19	Championship	33	6	2	1	1	0	—		3	0	39	7
Derby County	2019–20	Championship	37	10	3	0	0	0	—		—		40	10
Derby County	2020–21	Championship	23	3	0	0	0	0	—		—		23	3
Derby County	2021–22	Championship	38	11	1	0	0	0	—		—		39	11
Derby County	Total		170	36	7	1	3	0	0	0	5	0	185	37
Rangers	2022–23	Scottish Premiership	5	2	0	0	0	0	4 (Note: Appearances in UEFA Champions League)	1	—		9	3
Rangers	2023–24	Scottish Premiership	23	2	3	0	1	0	5 (Note: Appearances in UEFA Europa League)	1	—		32	3
Rangers	2024–25	Scottish Premiership	18	4	1	0	2	0	7	2	—		28	6
Rangers	Total		46	8	4	0	3	0	16	4	0	0	69	12
Perth Glory	2025–26	A-League	9	5	0	0	—		—		—		9	5
Career total			332	66	18	3	6	0	16	4	5	0	377	73

=== International ===
As of match played 14 August 2022

Appearances and goals by national team and year
National team	Year	Apps	Goals
Wales	2015	2	0
Wales	2016	3	0
Wales	2017	7	2
Wales	2018	6	1
Wales	2019	2	0
Wales	2020	2	0
Wales	2021	1	0
Total		23	3

Wales score listed first, score column indicates score after each Lawrence goal.

International goals by date, venue, cap, opponent, score, result and competition
No.	Date	Venue	Cap	Opponent	Score	Result	Competition	Ref
1	6 October 2017	Boris Paichadze Dinamo Arena, Tbilisi, Georgia	9	Georgia	1–0	1–0	2018 FIFA World Cup qualification	
2	14 November 2017	Cardiff City Stadium, Cardiff, Wales	12	Panama	1–0	1–1	Friendly	
3	6 September 2018	Cardiff City Stadium, Cardiff, Wales	15	Republic of Ireland	1–0	4–1	2018–19 UEFA Nations League B	

== Honours ==
Individual

- Ipswich Town Player's Player of the Season: 2016–17
- Ipswich Town Goal of the Season: 2016–17

Rangers

- Scottish League Cup : 2023–24
