= Lawrence Wong (disambiguation) =

Lawrence Wong is a Singaporean politician who serves as the fourth prime minister of Singapore since 2024.

Lawrence Wong may also refer to:

- Lawrence Wong (actor) (born 1988), Singaporean actor
- Lawrence Wong (soccer) (born 2007), Australian soccer player
