= Giovanni de Abreu =

Australian soccer player (born 2007)

Personal information
- Date of birth: 16 April 2007 (age 19)
- Place of birth: South Africa
- Height: 1.80 m (5 ft 11 in)
- Position: Defensive midfielder

Team information
- Current team: Perth Glory
- Number: 39

Youth career
- ECU Joondalup
- 2022–2025: Perth Glory

Senior career*
Years	Team	Apps	(Gls)
2025–	Perth Glory	17	(0)

International career^{‡}
2023	Australia U17	4	(1)
- * Club domestic league appearances and goals as of 28 March 2026 ‡ National team caps and goals as of 18 January 2026

Giovanni de Abreu (born 16 April 2007) is a professional football player who plays as a defensive midfielder for A-League Men club Perth Glory. Born in South Africa, he also represented Australia at under-17 level.

== Early life ==
de Abreu was born in South Africa, and is of Portuguese descent.

== Club career ==
In 2024, de Abreu's mother saw a post online by German club Bayern Munich, inviting players to join their World Squad initiative, in which players under the age of nineteen from around the world would represent the club in friendly matches. She applied on her son's behalf, and de Abreu was accepted from 10,000 applicants. Having also represented the World Squad in 2025, de Abreu returned to Australia to make his debut for his club, Perth Glory, when he came on as a substitute for Callum Timmins in Perth Glory's 1–0 loss to Adelaide United on 20 December 2025. He made his first start for the club in Perth Glory's 3–0 win against Central Coast Mariners on 10 January 2026, earning plaudits for his performance.

== Career statistics ==
=== Club ===
As of 18 January 2026.

Appearances and goals by club, season and competition
Club	Season	League			Cup		Other		Total	
Club	Season	Division	Apps	Goals	Apps	Goals	Apps	Goals	Apps	Goals
Perth Glory	2025–26	A-League Men	5	0	0	0	0	0	5	0
Career total			5	0	0	0	0	0	5	0
