= Nicholas Pennington =

Australian- Italian footballer (born 1998)

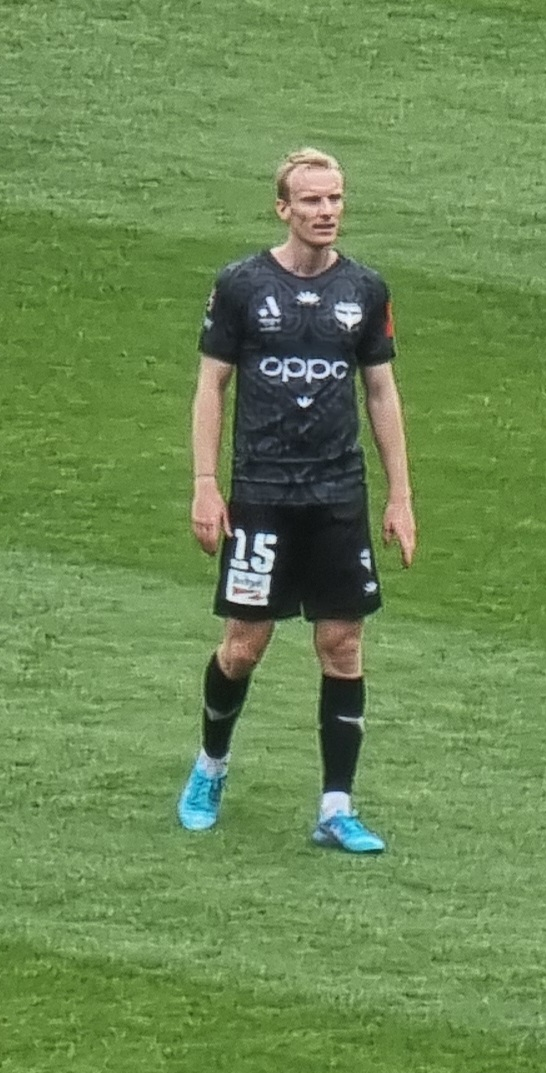
- Pennington playing for the Wellington Phoenix in 2024.

Personal information
- Date of birth: 18 December 1998 (age 27)
- Place of birth: Rome, Italy
- Height: 1.86 m (6 ft 1 in)
- Position: Central midfielder

Team information
- Current team: Torres
- Number: 18

Youth career
- –2016: Cagliari

Senior career*
Years	Team	Apps	(Gls)
2016–2018	Cagliari	0	(0)
2017–2018	→ Olbia (loan)	25	(1)
2018–2021	Olbia	90	(4)
2021–2024	Wellington Phoenix	61	(2)
2022	Wellington Phoenix Reserves	1	(1)
2024–2026	Perth Glory	44	(6)
2026–	Torres	1	(0)

International career^{‡}
2019–2021	Australia U23	5	(0)
- * Club domestic league appearances and goals as of 24 August 2026 ‡ National team caps and goals as of 22 December 2024

Nicholas Pennington (born 18 December 1998) is a professional soccer player who plays as a central midfielder for Serie C Group B club Torres. Born in Italy, he represented Australia at youth international level.

== Early life ==
Born in Rome, Pennington is of Australian descent through his father who originated from Perth. He has stated his interest in representing the Australia national team.

== Club career ==
=== Cagliari ===
Pennington began his career with Cagliari. He made his first appearance on the bench on 27 November 2016 in a Serie A match against Udinese and the second three days later in a match against Sampdoria in the fourth round of Coppa Italia, but both times he did not appear on the field.

==== Loan to Olbia ====
On 19 August 2017, he was loaned to Serie C club Olbia on a seasons-long loan deal. On 4 October, Pennington made his debut for Olbia as a substitute replacing Enrico Geroni in the 28th minute of a 0–0 home draw against Pistoiese. Four days later, on 8 October he played his first entire match for Olbia, a 2–1 home defeat against Robur Siena. On 18 February 2018, Pennington scored his first professional goal in the 51st minute of a 2–1 away win over Pistoiese. Pennington ended his loan to Olbia with 25 appearances, 1 goal and 1 assist.

=== Olbia ===
At the end of the loan period, Olbia signed Pennington outright for an undisclosed fee on a three-year contract. On 19 September he played his first match of the season in a 3–2 away win over Albissola, he was replaced by Joseph Tetteh after 75 minutes. Four days later he played his first entire match of the season, a 2–1 home win over Aurora Pro Patria.

=== Wellington Phoenix ===
On 30 July 2021, Pennington signed for New Zealand club Wellington Phoenix who play in the A-League. Pennington scored his first Phoenix goal on 26 March 2022, a 97th-minute winner in a 2–1 victory over Perth Glory.

On 19 June 2024, the Phoenix announced that Pennington was leaving the club.

=== Perth Glory ===
On 19 June 2024, Perth Glory announced that Pennington had joined the club on a two-year contract.

== Career statistics ==
=== Club ===
As of 19 July 2026

Club	Season	League			National cup (Note: Includes Coppa Italia, Australia Cup)		Other		Total	
Club	Season	Division	Apps	Goals	Apps	Goals	Apps	Goals	Apps	Goals
Cagliari	2016–17	Serie A	0	0	0	0	—		0	0
Olbia (loan)	2017–18	Serie C	25	1	—		0	0	25	1
Olbia	2018–19	Serie C	30	0	—		2 (Note: Appearances in Coppa Italia Serie C)	0	32	0
Olbia	2019–20	Serie C	24	2	—		2	0	26	2
Olbia	2020–21	Serie C	36	2	—		0	0	36	2
Olbia	Total		115	5	0	0	4	0	119	5
Wellington Phoenix	2021–22	A-League Men	22	1	4	0	—		26	1
Wellington Phoenix	2022–23	A-League Men	14	0	3	0	—		17	0
Wellington Phoenix	2023–24	A-League Men	25	1	2	1	—		27	2
Wellington Phoenix	Total		61	2	9	1	0	0	70	3
Wellington Phoenix Reserves	2022	New Zealand National League	1	1	—		—		1	1
Perth Glory	2024–25	A-League Men	21	1	0	0	—		21	0
Perth Glory	2025–26	A-League Men	23	5	0	0	—		23	5
Perth Glory	Total		44	6	0	0	0	0	44	6
Torres	2026–27	Serie C	0	0	—		0	0	0	0
Career total			221	14	9	1	4	0	234	15
