= Cristian Caicedo =

Colombian footballer (born 2002)

Personal information
- Full name: Cristian David Caicedo Castillo
- Date of birth: 4 January 2002 (age 24)
- Place of birth: Tumaco, Colombia
- Height: 1.68 m (5 ft 6 in)
- Position: Winger

Team information
- Current team: Orsomarso
- Number: 11

Senior career*
Years	Team	Apps	(Gls)
–2021	Loures		
2021–2022	Oriental		
2022–2023	Serpa	21	(1)
2023–2024	Orsomarso	30	(7)
2024	Perth Glory	3	(0)
2025–	Orsomarso	9	(1)
- * Club domestic league appearances and goals as of 2 May 2025

Cristian David Caicedo Castillo (born 4 January 2002) is a Colombian footballer who plays as a winger for Orsomarso.

== Life and career ==
Caicedo Castillo was born on 4 January 2002 in Tumaco, Colombia. He mainly operates as a right-winger. He is left-footed. He is known for his versatility. He is also known for his speed. He started his career with Portuguese side Loures. In 2021, he signed for Portuguese side Oriental. In 2022, he signed for Portuguese side Serpa. He made twenty-one league appearances and scored one goal while playing for the club.

In 2023, he signed for Colombian side Orsomarso. He was described as having an "outstanding performance... being a key piece" while playing for the club. He made thirty league appearances and scored seven goals while playing for them. He received interest from Colombian side América de Cali while playing for them. In 2024, he signed for Australian side Perth Glory. On 23 December 2024 it was announced that Caicedo had left Perth Glory by mutual consent.
