= Tosh Farrell =

Tony Farrell
- Other names: Tosh Farrell
- Occupation: Football coach
- Known for: The Everton Way

Tony "Tosh" Farrell is a football coach. He is the former Head of International Football Development and Technical Coordinator at the English Premier League club Everton F.C. where he became known for the development of Wayne Rooney, Victor Anichebe, James Vaughan, Jack Rodwell, Jose Baxter and Ross Barkley among others. He initially arrived part-time on the academy staff in 1996. Farrell is credited for playing a crucial role in the creation of 'The Everton Way', a coaching philosophy and culture that is committed to creating a successful club in a sustainable way.
