= Hiroaki Aoyama =

Japanese footballer (born 1996)

Personal information
- Full name: Hiroaki Aoyama
- Date of birth: 14 October 1996 (age 30)
- Place of birth: Tsushima, Aichi, Japan
- Height: 1.69 m (5 ft 7 in)
- Position: Midfielder

Youth career
- Tsushima SSS
- –2014: Nagoya Grampus

College career
Years	Team	Apps	(Gls)
2015	Chuo University		
2016–2019	Biwako Seikei Sport College		

Senior career*
Years	Team	Apps	(Gls)
2020–2021	Fukushima United	9	(0)
2022	Blacktown City	23	(4)
2023–2024	Marconi Stallions	38	(3)
2024–2025	Perth Glory	5	(0)
- * Club domestic league appearances and goals as of 8 January 2026

Hiroaki Aoyama (青山 景昌, Aoyama Hiroaki; born 14 October 1996) is a retired Japanese footballer who played as a midfielder.

== Early life ==
Hiroaki was born in Tsushima. He played for Tsushima SSS, Nagoya Grampus, Chuo University and Biwako Seikei Sport College during his youth.

== Career ==
Hiroaki made his league debut for Fukushima against YSCC Yokohama on the 29 July 2020.

Hiroaki scored on his league debut for Blacktown, scoring against Rockdale Ilinden in the 8th minute on the 6 March 2022.

Hiroaki made his league debut for Marconi against Sydney United 58 FC on the 5 February 2023. He scored his first goal for the club on the 11 February 2023, scoring against Sydney II in the 13th minute.

In 2024, Hiroaki made the step up from the semi-professional National Premier Leagues NSW to the professional top flight, signing for Perth Glory in July 2024. After making just five appearances and zero goals, Aoyama's contract was not renewed and he departed the club.

On 14 October 2025, Hiroaki announced his retirement from football on his Instagram account.

== Career statistics ==
=== Club ===
As of 23 June 2021.

Club	Season	League			National Cup		League Cup		Other		Total	
Club	Season	Division	Apps	Goals	Apps	Goals	Apps	Goals	Apps	Goals	Apps	Goals
Biwako Seikei Sport College	2017	–			1 (Note: Appearances in the Emperor's Cup)	0	–		0	0	1	0
Fukushima United	2020	J3 League	8	0	0	0	–		0	0	8	0
Fukushima United	2021	J3 League	0	0	0	0	–		0	0	0	0
Fukushima United	Total		8	0	0	0	0	0	0	0	8	0
Career total			8	0	1	0	0	0	0	0	9	0

== Honours ==
Blacktown City

NPL NSW: 2022
