= Adam Bugarija =

Australian soccer player (born 2005)

Personal information
- Date of birth: 22 February 2005 (age 21)
- Place of birth: Baulkham Hills, New South Wales, Australia
- Height: 1.74 m (5 ft 9 in)
- Position: Midfielder

Team information
- Current team: Sydney Olympic
- Number: 21

Youth career
- Sydney United
- –2023: Dinamo Zagreb
- 2023–2024: Western Sydney Wanderers

Senior career*
Years	Team	Apps	(Gls)
2023–2024	Western Sydney Wanderers NPL	28	(9)
2024–2026	Perth Glory	17	(1)
2026–	→ Marconi Stallions (loan)	11	(1)
2026–	Sydney Olympic	9	(1)

International career^{‡}
2024	Australia U19	3	(0)
2024–	Australia U20	6	(4)
- * Club domestic league appearances and goals as of 31 August 2026 ‡ National team caps and goals as of 29 October 2025

Adam Bugarija Cardeno (Croatian: [buˈɡarija], Spanish: [kaɾˈðeno]; born 22 February 2005) is an Australian soccer player who plays as a midfielder for Sydney Olympic in the National Premier Leagues NSW.

== Club career ==
Born in Baulkham Hills in New South Wales, Bugarija was a youth player at Sydney United and played for two years at Dinamo Zagreb in Croatia before returning to Sydney to play for Western Sydney Wanderers in 2023.

Bugarija played for Western Sydney Wanderers' reserve team in the National Premier Leagues NSW before joining fellow A-League Men team Perth Glory on a three-year deal in June 2024, having been convinced to join by director of football Stan Lazaridis. He made his debut on 3 August in the round of 32 of the Australia Cup, at home to Melbourne City; coming on in the 70th minute, he scored the equaliser as the match finished 4–4 in regulation time, with the Western Australian side scoring the winning goal in extra time. In the next round 25 days later away to Moreton City Excelsior of the National Premier Leagues Queensland, he was sent off for two yellow cards in 42 minutes in a 3–2 loss.

Bugarija made his A-League debut on 20 October as the season opened with a 6–1 loss away to Macarthur. He came on as a half-time substitute and scored a consolation goal. He was one of 18 teenagers in the league, a record for an opening day of the league season.

On 29 January 2026, Bugarija joined National Premier Leagues NSW side Marconi Stallions on loan from Perth Glory.

== International career ==
In July 2024, Bugarija was called up by the Australia under-19 team for the 2024 ASEAN U-19 Boys Championship in Indonesia. Five months later, he was one of three Perth Glory teammates called up for the 2025 AFC U-20 Asian Cup in China. He was an unused substitute as Australia won the title for the first time, defeating Saudi Arabia in the final.
