= Anas Hamzaoui =

Belgian footballer

Personal information
- Date of birth: 14 July 1996 (age 30)
- Place of birth: Brussels, Belgium
- Height: 1.75 m (5 ft 9 in)
- Position: Left-back

Youth career
- Anderlecht
- Mechelen
- RWDM
- Club Brugge
- Sint-Truidense

Senior career*
Years	Team	Apps	(Gls)
2016–2017	Tubize	5	(0)
2017–2022	Union SG	51	(0)
2021–2022	→ Virton (loan)	20	(0)
2022–2023	RAAL La Louvière	13	(0)
2024–2025	Perth Glory	10	(0)
- * Club domestic league appearances and goals as of 20 May 2025

Anas Hamzaoui (Arabic: انس حمزاوي; born 14 July 1996) is a Belgian professional footballer who plays as a left-back.

== Career ==
Hamzaoui spent time playing youth football with Anderlecht, Mechelen, RWDM, Club Brugge and Sint-Truidense.

In 2022, Hamzaoui signed for RAAL La Louvière in the Belgian National Division 1, the third tier of Belgian football. He left the club at the end of his contract after the 2022–23 season.

On 10 June 2024, Hamzaoui joined Australian A-League club Perth Glory on a two-year deal.

== Personal life ==
Born in Belgium, Hamzaoui is of Moroccan descent.

== Career statistics ==
As of September 2024

Appearances and goals by club, season and competition
Club	Season	League			National cup		Other		Total	
Club	Season	Division	Apps	Goals	Apps	Goals	Apps	Goals	Apps	Goals
Tubize	2016–17	Challenger Pro League	5	0	1	0	0	0	6	0
Royale Union Saint-Gilloise	2017–18	Challenger Pro League	9	0	0	0	0	0	9	0
Royale Union Saint-Gilloise	2018–19	Challenger Pro League	8	0	3	0	9 (Note: Appearance(s) in Belgian Europa League Playoff)	0	20	0
Royale Union Saint-Gilloise	2019–20	Challenger Pro League	17	0	2	0	0	0	19	0
Royale Union Saint-Gilloise	2020–21	Challenger Pro League	8	0	1	0	0	0	9	0
Royale Union Saint-Gilloise	Total		42	0	6	0	9	0	57	0
Excelsior Virton (loan)	2021–22	Challenger Pro League	20	0	0	0	0	0	20	0
RAAL La Louvière	2022–23	Belgian National Division 1	13	0	1	0	0	0	14	0
Perth Glory FC	2024–25	A-League Men	8	0	0	0	0	0	0	0
Career total			80	0	8	0	9	0	97	0
