= Yuto Misao =

Japanese footballer (born 1991)

Yuto Misao 三竿 雄斗
Personal information
- Full name: Yuto Misao
- Date of birth: 16 April 1991 (age 35)
- Place of birth: Musashino, Tokyo, Japan
- Height: 1.75 m (5 ft 9 in)
- Positions: Left-back; centre-back

Team information
- Current team: Oita Trinita
- Number: 6

Youth career
- 2001–2006: Yokogawa Musashino
- 2007–2009: Tokyo Verdy

College career
Years	Team	Apps	(Gls)
2010–2013	Waseda University		

Senior career*
Years	Team	Apps	(Gls)
2013–2016	Shonan Bellmare	105	(4)
2017–2018	Kashima Antlers	3	(0)
2019–2022	Oita Trinita	139	(2)
2023–2025	Kyoto Sanga	14	(0)
2025	Perth Glory	12	(0)
2025–	Oita Trinita	35	(1)
Medal record
Kashima Antlers
Winner	AFC Champions League	2018
Runner-up	J1 League	2017
- * Club domestic league appearances and goals as of 16 August 2026

Yuto Misao (三竿 雄斗, Misao Yūto; born 16 April 1991, Tokyo, Japan) is a Japanese footballer who plays as a left-back or centre-back for Oita Trinita.

His younger brother Kento is also a professional footballer currently playing for Kashima Antlers.

== Club statistics ==
Updated to 1 August 2022.

Club performance			League		Cup		League Cup		Continental		Other		Total	
Season	Club	League	Apps	Goals	Apps	Goals	Apps	Goals	Apps	Goals	Apps	Goals	Apps	Goals
Japan			League		Emperor's Cup		J. League Cup		AFC		Other^{1}		Total	
2013	Shonan Bellmare	J1 League	0	0	0	0	2	0	–		–		2	0
2014	Shonan Bellmare	J2 League	40	1	2	1	–		–		–		42	2
2015	Shonan Bellmare	J1 League	33	1	1	0	4	0	–		–		38	1
2016	Shonan Bellmare	J1 League	32	2	3	0	2	0	–		–		37	2
2017	Kashima Antlers	J1 League	2	0	1	0	1	0	2	0	1	0	7	0
2018	Kashima Antlers	J1 League	1	0	0	0	0	0	1	0	0	0	2	0
2019	Oita Trinita	J1 League	26	1	2	0	1	0	–		–		29	1
2020	Oita Trinita	J1 League	34	0	–		1	0	–		–		35	0
2021	Oita Trinita	J1 League	36	1	3	0	1	0	–		–		40	1
2022	Oita Trinita	J2 League	28	0	0	0	1	0	–		–		29	0
Total			232	6	12	1	13	0	3	0	1	0	260	7

^{1}Includes Japanese Super Cup.

== Achievements ==
Shonan Bellmare

- J2 League (1): 2014

Kashima Antlers

- Japanese Super Cup (1): 2017
- AFC Champions League (1): 2018
