= Andriano Lebib =

Australian soccer player

Personal information
- Date of birth: 29 January 2006 (age 20)
- Place of birth: Perth, Australia
- Height: 1.90 m (6 ft 3 in)
- Position: Centre-back

Team information
- Current team: Perth Glory
- Number: 24

Youth career
- Perth Glory

Senior career*
| Years | Team | Apps | (Gls) |
| 2024– | Perth Glory | 16 | (0) |

International career
| 2022–2023 | Australia U17 | 7 | (0) |
- * Club domestic league appearances and goals as of 10:14, 11 October 2026 (UTC)

Andriano Lebib (/ænˈdriːɑno ˈlɛbɪb/; born 29 January 2006) is an Australian soccer player who plays as a centre-back for Perth Glory in the A-League Men.

== Club career ==
Born in Perth in Western Australia, Lebib came through the academy at Perth Glory. He made his debut on 28 April 2024 in the final game of the A-League Men season. He came on as a 54th-minute substitute for Mustafa Amini in a 7–1 loss away to Sydney FC. In June, he and Khoa Ngo signed scholarship contracts. In January 2025, Lebib was sidelined with a knee injury.

== International career ==
In September 2022, Lebib was first called up for the Australia under-17 team for 2023 AFC U-17 Asian Cup qualification matches in Shepparton. The following June, he was chosen for the final tournament in Thailand, being substituted in a quarter-final loss to eventual champions Japan.
