= Taras Gomulka =

Australian soccer player (born 2001)

Personal information
- Full name: Taras Jan Gomulka
- Date of birth: 16 September 2001 (age 25)
- Place of birth: Adelaide, Australia
- Height: 1.82 m (6 ft 0 in)
- Position: Central midfielder

Team information
- Current team: Pacific FC

Youth career
- Modbury Vista
- Adelaide City
- Adelaide Raiders
- SA NTC
- 2017: MetroStars

Senior career*
Years	Team	Apps	(Gls)
2018–2020	Adelaide United NPL	30	(2)
2020	Adelaide United	5	(0)
2020–2023	Melbourne City	34	(0)
2023–2024	Brisbane Roar	33	(0)
2024–2026	Perth Glory	22	(0)
2026–	Pacific FC	25	(3)

International career^{‡}
2021–	Australia U23	1	(0)
- * Club domestic league appearances and goals as of 27 October 2026 ‡ National team caps and goals as of 1 November 2021

Taras Jan Gomulka (Ukrainian: Тарас Ян Гомулка, pronounced [tɑˈrɑs jɑn ɦoˈmulkɑ]; born 16 September 2001) is an Australian professional soccer player who plays as a central midfielder for Pacific FC in the Canadian Premier League.

== Club career ==
=== Adelaide United ===
Gomulka made his A-League debut for Adelaide United following the resumption of the 2019–20 A-League season which was postponed due to the COVID-19 pandemic in Australia, being named in the starting eleven for their clash against Brisbane Roar on 19 July 2020. He was substituted off in the 72nd minute. On 11 September 2020, the club announced Gomulka would depart after rejecting an offer to sign a senior deal.

=== Melbourne City ===
On 21 September 2020, Gomulka signed a three-year deal with Melbourne City.

=== Brisbane Roar ===
In February 2023, Gomulka departed Melbourne City and joined Brisbane Roar.

=== Perth Glory ===
On 21 June 2024, Gomulka departed Brisbane Roar and joined Perth Glory on a two-year deal.

== Personal life ==
Gomulka is of Polish and Ukrainian descent. His maternal grandfather, Wally Fedczyszyn played for USC Lion in the South Australian First Division and represented South Australia at the State level.

== Honours ==
Melbourne City

- A-League Premiership: 2020–21
- A-League Championship: 2021
