= Scott Wootton =

English footballer (born 1991)

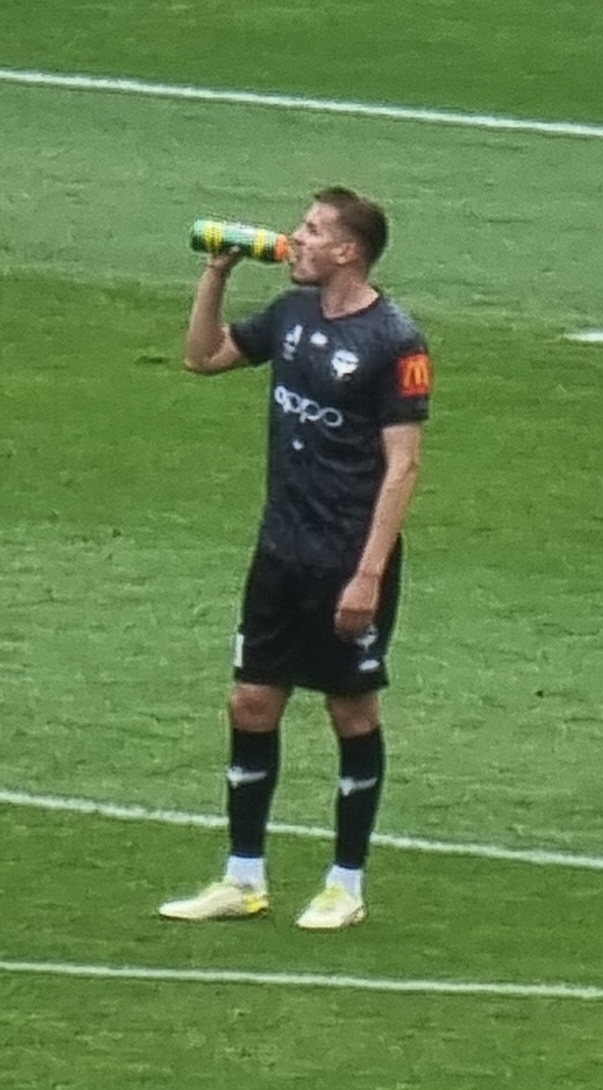
- Scott Wootton playing for the Wellington Phoenix in 2024.

Personal information
- Full name: Scott James Wootton
- Date of birth: 12 September 1991 (age 35)
- Place of birth: Birkenhead, England
- Height: 6 ft 2 in (1.88 m)
- Position: Defender

Youth career
- 2004–2007: Liverpool
- 2007–2010: Manchester United

Senior career*
Years	Team	Apps	(Gls)
2010–2013	Manchester United	0	(0)
2010–2011	→ Tranmere Rovers (loan)	7	(1)
2011–2012	→ Peterborough United (loan)	11	(0)
2012	→ Nottingham Forest (loan)	13	(0)
2013	→ Peterborough United (loan)	2	(1)
2013–2016	Leeds United	66	(1)
2014–2015	→ Rotherham United (loan)	7	(0)
2016–2018	Milton Keynes Dons	39	(1)
2018–2021	Plymouth Argyle	69	(1)
2021	→ Wigan Athletic (loan)	13	(1)
2021–2022	Morecambe	10	(1)
2022–2025	Wellington Phoenix	94	(3)
2025–2026	Perth Glory	26	(0)
Total		357	(10)

International career
2007	England U17	3	(0)
- * Club domestic league appearances and goals

Scott James Wootton (/ˈwʊtən/ WUUT-ən; born 12 September 1991) is a former English professional footballer who played as a defender.

Wootton also gained three caps for the England U17 national team.

== Club career ==
=== Manchester United ===
Born in Birkenhead, Wirral, Wootton began his career with Tranmere Rovers before joining Liverpool at the age of 13. After making his under-18s debut at the age of 14, he left Liverpool for Manchester United two years later. After captaining the academy team in 2009–10, he was promoted to the reserves for the 2010–11 campaign, where he became a regular player in the early part of the season.

On 30 September 2010, he joined Tranmere Rovers on a month's loan.

He made his debut on 2 October 2010, scoring a late equalising goal in the 1–1 draw with Brighton. He went on to make five appearances for the club while on his loan spell. He re-joined the club on 25 November on a second loan spell. His first confirmed league goal came on his second debut for Rovers on 11 December against Leyton Orient.

Wootton made his Manchester United senior debut in Gary Neville's testimonial game in May 2011. He came on to replace Neville in the 85th minute of the match. On 1 July 2011, Wootton joined teammate Ryan Tunnicliffe at Peterborough United, with a loan contract confirmed later in the month.

Wootton made his Peterborough United debut on 20 August 2011 in a 7–1 win over Ipswich Town. On 23 January 2012, he returned to Manchester United after having his loan spell terminated.

Wootton completed a loan switch to Championship side Nottingham Forest on the 31 January 2012 deadline day, where he remained on loan until the end of the season.

Wearing the number 31 shirt, Wootton made his competitive, first-team debut for Manchester United on 26 September 2012, in a 2–1 win against Newcastle United in the League Cup at Old Trafford. On 2 October he made his UEFA Champions League debut, coming on as a second-half substitute for Jonny Evans in a 2–1 win against CFR Cluj. On 31 October 2012, Wootton started for Manchester United in a 5–4 loss against Chelsea, with Wootton conceding a penalty in injury time which was converted by Chelsea winger Eden Hazard to send the tie into extra time.

On 9 January 2013, Wootton joined Peterborough United on loan until the end of the season alongside his Manchester United teammate Davide Petrucci. Wootton scored on his debut on 12 January, in a 2–1 defeat to Nottingham Forest. However, his loan spell was cut short when he picked up a hamstring injury that ruled him out for a number of weeks, forcing a return to his parent club.

=== Leeds United ===
On 20 August 2013, Wootton joined Championship club Leeds United on a three-year contract. Wootton cost Leeds £1 million. Wootton was allocated the number 22 shirt for the 2013–14 season. Upon signing for Leeds Wootton revealed that it 'wasn't a difficult decision to join a club the size of Leeds'. On 27 August 2013, Wootton made his Leeds United debut in the League Cup, scoring in 3–1 victory over Doncaster Rovers. Wootton made his league debut against Queens Park Rangers on 31 August, replacing Tom Lees.

Despite the summer sale of Tom Lees, Wootton found himself dropping down the pecking order after the summer signings of Giuseppe Bellusci, Liam Cooper and Dario Del Fabro, Wootton found himself as fifth-choice centre-back (also behind captain Jason Pearce), on 27 November 2014 Wootton joined Rotherham United on loan until 10 January 2015. After an impressive run of form for Rotherham United, a permanent transfer was blocked at the last minute on 15 January 2015 by Leeds owner Massimo Cellino. Wootton subsequently returned to Leeds from his successful loan spell. Wootton came immediately back into the Leeds starting line-up against Birmingham City on 17 January.

During 2015, Wootton became Leeds regular right-back in a 4–2–3–1 formation, with Sam Byram playing in a right wing role. On 23 February, Wootton signed a new one-year contract extension to his original deal.

On 31 July 2015, Wootton was given the number 4 shirt for the 2015–16 season. On 12 August 2015, Wootton started in a new role under Uwe Rösler as a defensive midfielder against Doncaster Rovers in the League Cup; Leeds lost 4–2 on penalties after a 1–1 draw in regulation time, with Wootton giving away a penalty in the first half.

During his time at Leeds United, under the management of Steve Evans in 2015, Wootton was reportedly subjected to an internal disciplinary measure after missing a training session, and was made to wear a novelty outfit (Lucas the Kop Cat) as a pre-match punishment. The incident was said to have been intended as a light-hearted deterrent, reflecting Evans’ approach to enforcing squad standards and maintaining discipline within the first-team group.

On 20 February 2016, Wootton scored a memorable own goal in a 1–0 defeat against Premier League side Watford in the FA Cup, to send Watford through to the quarter-finals of the Competition. Wootton played his last game for Leeds in the final game of the 2015–16 season on 7 May 2016 against Preston North End in a 1–1 draw.

On 10 May 2016, Yorkshire Evening Post revealed that Wootton was set to be released by the club, amid confusion over a contract extension announced on 23 February 2015, believed to be until 2017, that paperwork was never actually finalised.

=== Milton Keynes Dons ===
On 5 August 2016, Wootton joined League One club Milton Keynes Dons on a two-year deal. Wootton made his debut for the club on 9 August 2016 in his more natural position of centre back, captaining a young Dons' side in a 2–3 EFL Cup first round away win against League Two team Newport County.

On 20 August 2016, Wootton started his first league game for the club and scored a 95th-minute winner with a header in a 0–1 away win to Rochdale.

On 30 August 2016, during an EFL Trophy group stage tie against Barnet, Wootton suffered a ruptured anterior cruciate ligament (ACL). On 1 September 2016, Milton Keynes Dons announced that due to his injury it was anticipated that Wootton would be sidelined for up to nine months.

He made his first team return against Wigan Athletic on 5 August 2017, the first day of the following league season; however, he was sent off as they lost 1–0.

=== Plymouth Argyle ===
On 27 June 2018, following his release from Milton Keynes Dons, Wootton signed for League One club Plymouth Argyle effective from 1 July 2018. Following a troubled first season through injuries and the Pilgrims getting relegated from League One, the 19–20 season in League Two proved something of a redemptive season for Wootton. Given the no.5 shirt, Wootton went on to play the majority of Argyle's games as the right-sided centre half in a 3–5–2 formation. He scored his first goal for the club on 7 September 2019 against Oldham Athletic in their 2–2 draw at Home Park.

Argyle were promoted, finishing third in League Two on PPG. Wootton was offered a new contract at Argyle, and signed it on 25 June 2020.

On 1 February 2021, Wootton joined League One side Wigan Athletic on loan for the remainder of the 2020–21 season. He scored his first goal for Wigan, a last minute winner, in a 2–1 win at Bristol Rovers on 23 February 2021.

Wootton was released by the Pilgrims at the end of the 2020–21 season.

=== Morecambe ===
On 10 August 2021, Wootton joined League One side Morecambe on a one-year deal. On 7 January 2022, Wootton had his contract with the club terminated by the request of Wootton and his agent.

=== Wellington Phoenix ===
On 7 January 2022, following his release from Morecambe, Wootton agreed to join A-League side Wellington Phoenix for the remainder of their season. On 16 February 2022, Wootton scored his first goal for the Phoenix in a 3–0 victory against Brisbane Roar. The Phoenix renewed his contract for three more seasons on 24 March 2022.

=== Perth Glory ===
In May 2025 he moved to Australia, joining Perth Glory on a two year contract. He made his debut against former club Wellington Phoenix in the Australia Cup 2025 Round of 32.

On 10 September 2026, Wootton retired from professional football and immediately took up a new role as Technical Director of the PGFC Senior Academy.

== International career ==
Wootton appeared three times for the England U17 team in the 2007 Nordic Championships.

== Career statistics ==
Appearances and goals by club, season and competition
Club	Season	League			National cup (Note: Includes the FA Cup and Australia Cup)		League cup (Note: Includes the League Cup)		Other		Total	
Club	Season	Division	Apps	Goals	Apps	Goals	Apps	Goals	Apps	Goals	Apps	Goals
Manchester United	2010–11	Premier League	0	0	0	0	0	0	0	0	0	0
Manchester United	2011–12	Premier League	0	0	0	0	0	0	0	0	0	0
Manchester United	2012–13	Premier League	0	0	0	0	2	0	2 (Note: Appearances in the UEFA Champions League)	0	4	0
Manchester United	Total		0	0	0	0	2	0	2	0	4	0
Tranmere Rovers (loan)	2010–11	League One	7	1	0	0	0	0	2 (Note: Appearance(s) in EFL Trophy)	0	9	1
Peterborough United (loan)	2011–12	Championship	11	0	1	0	2	0	—		14	0
Nottingham Forest (loan)	2011–12	Championship	13	0	—		0	0	—		13	0
Peterborough United (loan)	2012–13	Championship	2	1	0	0	0	0	—		2	1
Leeds United	2013–14	Championship	20	0	1	0	2	1	—		23	1
Leeds United	2014–15	Championship	23	0	0	0	2	0	—		25	0
Leeds United	2015–16	Championship	23	0	2	0	1	0	—		26	0
Leeds United	Total		66	0	3	0	5	1	—		74	1
Rotherham United (loan)	2014–15	Championship	7	0	0	0	0	0	—		7	0
Milton Keynes Dons	2016–17	League One	1	1	0	0	2	0	1	0	4	1
Milton Keynes Dons	2017–18	League One	38	0	3	0	0	0	2	0	42	0
Milton Keynes Dons	Total		39	1	3	0	2	0	3	0	46	1
Plymouth Argyle	2018–19	League One	24	0	0	0	2	0	0	0	26	0
Plymouth Argyle	2019–20	League Two	35	1	3	0	1	0	3	0	42	1
Plymouth Argyle	2020–21	League One	10	0	2	0	2	0	2	0	16	0
Plymouth Argyle	Total		69	1	5	0	5	0	5	0	84	1
Wigan Athletic (loan)	2020–21	League One	13	1	0	0	0	0	0	0	13	1
Morecambe	2021–22	League One	10	1	1	0	0	0	3	0	14	1
Wellington Phoenix	2021–22	A-League Men	19	2	0	0	—		—		19	2
Wellington Phoenix	2022–23	A-League Men	21	0	3	0	—		—		24	0
Wellington Phoenix	2023–24	A-League Men	29	0	2	0	—		—		31	0
Wellington Phoenix	2024–25	A-League Men	25	1	2	0	—		—		27	1
Wellington Phoenix	Total		94	3	7	0	0	0	0	0	101	3
Perth Glory	2025–26	A-League Men	26	0	1	0	—		—		27	0
Perth Glory	2026–27	A-League Men	—		1	0	—		—		1	0
Perth Glory	Total		26	0	2	0	0	0	0	0	28	0
Career total			357	9	22	0	16	1	15	0	395	10

== Honours ==
Individual

- PFA A-League Team of the Season: 2023–24
- A-Leagues All Star: 2024
