= Khoa Ngo =

Soccer player (born 2006)

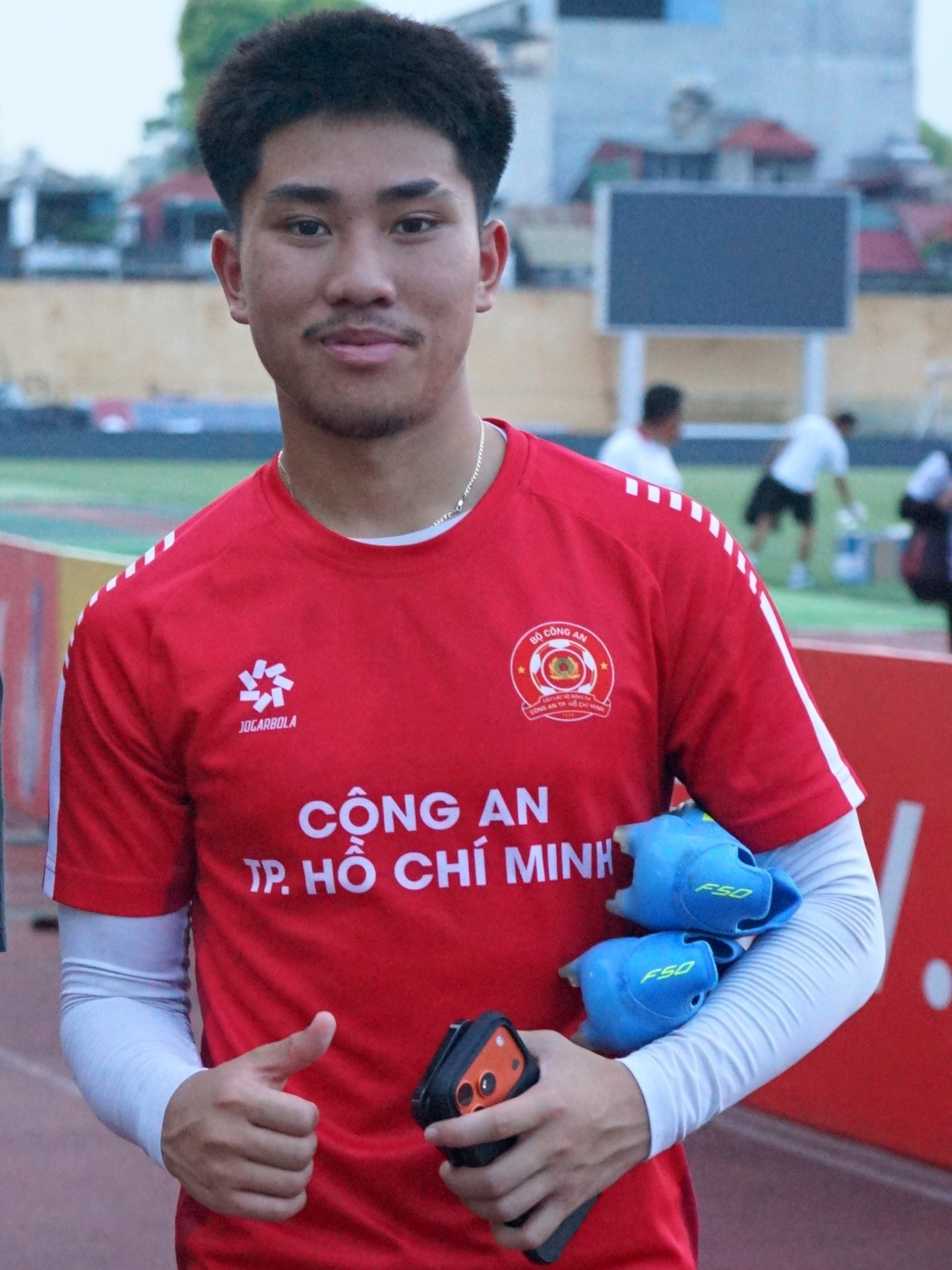
- Khoa Ngo in 2026

Personal information
- Full name: Dang Khoa Ngo
- Date of birth: 30 June 2006 (age 20)
- Place of birth: Perth, Australia
- Height: 1.65 m (5 ft 5 in)
- Position: Winger

Team information
- Current team: Cong An Ho Chi Minh City
- Number: 26

Youth career
- –2018: Joondalup United
- 2018–2020: Perth RedStar
- 2020–2023: Perth Glory

Senior career*
Years	Team	Apps	(Gls)
2022–2024	Perth Glory NPL	45	(13)
2024–2026	Perth Glory	26	(1)
2026	→ Cong An Ho Chi Minh City (loan)	11	(3)
2026–	Cong An Ho Chi Minh City	6	(0)

International career^{‡}
2026–	Vietnam U23	3	(0)
2026–	Vietnam	3	(0)
- * Club domestic league appearances and goals as of 8 November 2026 ‡ National team caps and goals as of 14 November 2026

Dang Khoa Ngo (Vietnamese: [ŋɔ˧˦ xwaː]; born 30 June 2006), also known as Ngô Đăng Khoa, is a professional soccer player who plays as a winger for V.League 1 club Cong An Ho Chi Minh City. Born in Australia, he plays for the Vietnam national team.

== Club career ==
=== Perth Glory ===
Ngo was born in Perth, Australia to parents of Vietnamese descent. He was a youth product of Perth Glory.

On 21 April 2024, Ngo made his professional with Perth Glory, coming in as a substitute in his team's 3–4 A-League Men defeat against Western United.

On 2 January 2026, Ngo scored his first senior goal for the club in a 3–2 loss to Melbourne Victory, coming on as a second-half substitute.

=== Cong An Ho Chi Minh City ===
On 4 January 2026, Ngo completed a loan move to Vietnamese club Cong An Ho Chi Minh City until the end of the 2025–26 season. He helped the team win the 2025–26 Vietnamese Cup, their first cup title in 26 years.

On 12 August 2026, Perth Glory confirmed that Cong An Ho Chi Minh City had triggered the buy option for Ngo.

== International career ==
In June 2026, Ngo was called up to the Vietnam national team for the first time, being named in the preliminary squad for the 2026 ASEAN Championship. However, he withdrew from the tournament due to a meniscus injury.

In September 2026, Ngo was named in Vietnam's final squad for the 2026 FIFA ASEAN Cup.

== Personal life ==
On 13 May 2026, Ngo obtained his Vietnamese citizenship.

== Career statistics ==
=== Club ===
As of match played 18 November 2026

Appearances and goals by club, season and competition
Club	Season	League			National cup		Continental		Other		Total	
Club	Season	Division	Apps	Goals	Apps	Goals	Apps	Goals	Apps	Goals	Apps	Goals
Perth Glory	2023–24	A-League Men	2	0	0	0	—		—		2	0
Perth Glory	2024–25	A-League Men	18	0	3	0	—		—		21	0
Perth Glory	2025–26	A-League Men	6	1	2	0	—		—		8	1
Perth Glory	Total		26	1	5	0	0	0	0	0	31	1
Cong An Ho Chi Minh City (loan)	2025–26	V.League 1	11	3	3	1	—		—		14	4
Cong An Ho Chi Minh City	2026–27	V.League 1	6	0	0	0	—		2 (Note: Appearances in ASEAN Club Championship)	0	8	0
Cong An Ho Chi Minh City	Total		17	3	3	1	0	0	2	0	22	4
Career total			43	4	8	1	0	0	2	0	53	5

=== International ===
As of match played 26 September 2026

Appearances and goals by national team and year
National team	Year	Apps	Goals
Vietnam	2026	1	0
Total		1	0

== Honours ==
Công An Hồ Chí Minh City

- Vietnamese National Cup: 2025–26

Vietnam U23

- Gia Lai U-23 VTV Cup: 2026
