= Kaelan Majekodunmi =

Australian soccer player

Personal information
- Full name: Kaelan Andrew Moore Majekodunmi
- Date of birth: 21 February 2004 (age 22)
- Place of birth: Northampton, England
- Height: 1.88 m (6 ft 2 in)
- Position: Centre-back

Team information
- Current team: Swindon Town
- Number: 21

Youth career
- 2021: ECU Joondalup
- 2022–2023: Perth Glory

Senior career*
Years	Team	Apps	(Gls)
2021	ECU Joondalup	3	(0)
2022	Gwelup Croatia	12	(0)
2022–2025	Perth Glory NPL	26	(1)
2023–2026	Perth Glory	15	(2)
2026	→ Dandenong Thunder (loan)	3	(0)
2026	Olympic Kingsway	3	(0)
2026–	Swindon Town	1	(0)

International career^{‡}
2022–2023	Australia U20	4	(0)
2025–	Australia U23	1	(0)
- * Club domestic league appearances and goals as of 17 August 2026 ‡ National team caps and goals as of 4 September 2025

Kaelan Andrew Moore Majekodunmi (/ˈkeɪ.lən ma.dʒe.koˈdun.mi/; born 21 February 2004) is a professional soccer player who plays as a centre-back for EFL League Two club Swindon Town. Born in England, he represents Australia at youth level.

== Career ==
Majekodunmi made his senior debut for Perth in the Round 11 clash against Melbourne Victory, where despite Perth ultimately losing 3–2, Majekodunmi scored to tie the game at 2–2. He would make appearances for the Glory in the final nine games of the season, and scored his second goal against Sydney FC in a tightly contested 1–1 draw.

On 6 August 2026, Majekodunmi returned to his birth country of England to sign for EFL League Two club Swindon Town after a successful trial.

== International career ==
Having made his debut for the Australian U-20s in an exhibition match against Morocco U-20s, Majekodunmi was called up to the Young Socceroos for the 2023 AFC U-20 Asian Cup

== Career statistics ==
As of 17 August 2026

Appearances and goals by club, season and competition
Club	Season	League			National Cup		League Cup		Other		Total	
Club	Season	Division	Apps	Goals	Apps	Goals	Apps	Goals	Apps	Goals	Apps	Goals
Perth Glory U21	2023	NPL Western Australia Men's	1	0	–		–		–		1	0
Perth Glory	2023–24	A-League Men	10	2	1	0	–		–		11	2
Perth Glory	2024–25	A-League Men	5	0	2	0	–		–		7	0
Perth Glory	Total		16	2	3	0	–		–		19	2
Swindon Town	2026–27	EFL League Two	1	0	0	0	0	0	0	0	1	0
Career total			17	2	3	0	0	0	0	0	20	2
