= Trent Ostler =

Australian soccer player

Personal information
- Full name: Trent Jordan Ostler
- Date of birth: 3 April 2002 (age 24)
- Place of birth: Subiaco, Western Australia, Australia
- Height: 1.84 m (6 ft 0 in)
- Position: Right midfielder

Team information
- Current team: Perth Glory
- Number: 20

Youth career
- ECU Joondalup
- 2016–2019: Perth Glory

Senior career*
Years	Team	Apps	(Gls)
2018–2019	Perth Glory NPL	34	(0)
2019–	Perth Glory	76	(5)

International career^{‡}
2017–2019	Australia U-17	11	(3)
Medal record
Men's football
Representing Australia
AFF U-16 Youth Championship
Third place	2017 Thailand	U-17 Team
- * Club domestic league appearances and goals as of 2 January 2026 ‡ National team caps and goals as of 8 December 2019

Trent Jordan Ostler (born 3 April 2002) is an Australian professional soccer player who plays as an right midfielder for Perth Glory.

== Club career ==
Trent Osler was 8 years old when he joined the PGFC Academy. He later joined Perth Glory in 2019.

On 7 August 2019, Ostler made his competitive debut for Perth Glory, in a 2–1 extra time loss to Western Sydney Wanderers in the FFA Cup.

As of the 2022/23 campaign, he has made five senior appearances.
