= Will Freney =

Australian association football player (born 2005)

Personal information
- Full name: William Freney
- Date of birth: 4 November 2005 (age 20)
- Height: 1.78 m (5 ft 10 in)
- Position: Central midfielder

Team information
- Current team: Perth Glory
- Number: 27

Youth career
- 2010–2014: Camden Falcons
- 2014–2016: Marconi Stallions
- 2016–2023: Western Sydney Wanderers
- 2023–2024: Macarthur FC
- 2024–2025: Perth Glory

Senior career*
Years	Team	Apps	(Gls)
2024–	Perth Glory	34	(0)

International career^{‡}
2023	Australia U20	2	(2)
- * Club domestic league appearances and goals as of 25 April 2026 ‡ National team caps and goals as of 29 October 2025

William Freney (/ˈfriːni/; born 4 November 2005) is an Australian soccer player who plays as a central midfielder for Perth Glory.

== Club career ==
Raised in Elderslie in the suburbs of Sydney, Freney began playing at age 5 for Camden Falcons before joining Marconi Stallions and then the academy of Western Sydney Wanderers.

In June 2024, Freney moved from Macarthur FC's Bulls FC Academy of the National Premier Leagues NSW to a two-year scholarship contract with Perth Glory in A-League Men. He made his professional debut on 21 December in a 1–0 win away to Brisbane Roar, as a substitute for David Williams in added time. His first start came on 14 January 2025 in a 2–1 home loss to Western Sydney Wanderers. Local newspaper The West Australian judged that he coped well.

By February 2025, Freney was one of several young players who had transitioned into the first team at Perth Glory. He credited veterans such as captain Adam Taggart with aiding the step up.

== International career ==
In January 2023, Freney was part of an Australia under-18 and under-19 schoolboys team that played friendlies away to their equivalents from the Republic of Ireland and Northern Ireland. He scored in a 2–1 loss in Dublin and a 3–1 win in Belfast.
