= Joel Anasmo =

South Sudanese footballer (born 2000)

Personal information
- Full name: Joel Anasmo
- Date of birth: 24 September 2004 (age 22)
- Place of birth: Cairo, Egypt
- Height: 1.80 m (5 ft 11 in)
- Position: Winger

Youth career
- Floreat Athena FC
- –2023: Perth Glory

Senior career*
Years	Team	Apps	(Gls)
2023–2026	Perth Glory NPL	19	(8)
2023–2026	Perth Glory	23	(1)
2025	→ Jeonbuk Hyundai Motors (loan)	0	(0)
2025	→ Jeonbuk Hyundai Motors N (loan)	1	(0)
- * Club domestic league appearances and goals as of 29 April 2026 ‡ National team caps and goals as of 21 November 2023

Joel Anasmo (Dinka: [a.nás.mo]; born 24 September 2004) is a South Sudanese footballer who last played for Perth Glory.

== Early life ==
Anasmo was born a South Sudanese refugee in Egypt and raised in the Ellenbrook region of Perth. He played his junior football at Floreat Athena whilst also representing his school Emmanuel Christian Community School.

== Career ==
Anasmo was a second half substitution for Perth Glory in a pre-season friendly against English Premier League club West Ham United, where his performance drew praise from pundits as well as Glory manager Alen Stajcic.

His full debut for the Western Australia club, came during the 2023-24 season in a come from behind win against Melbourne City in which Anasmo scored the 4th goal, having come off the bench.

On 8 April 2025, Korean club Jeonbuk announced his signing on loan from Perth. He played one match for the club's reserve team in the K3 League before his loan ended in June.

== Personal life ==
Joel Anasmo's brother Joshua Anasmo previously played for Perth Glory.
