= Zach Lisolajski =

Australian soccer player

Personal information
- Full name: Zach Lisolajski
- Date of birth: 5 October 2005 (age 21)
- Place of birth: Melbourne, Australia
- Height: 1.88 m (6 ft 2 in)
- Position: Left back

Team information
- Current team: Preston Lions
- Number: 29

Youth career
- –2021: Sydenham Park Soccer Club
- 2023: Newcastle Jets
- 2023–2024: Western United

Senior career*
Years	Team	Apps	(Gls)
2021–2022	Sydenham Park	23	(10)
2023	Newcastle Jets Youth	15	(4)
2023–2024	Western United Youth	5	(1)
2023–2024	Western United	6	(0)
2024–2026	Perth Glory	19	(0)
2026–	Preston Lions	4	(1)

International career^{‡}
2023–2025	Australian U20	10	(0)
Medal record
Men's football
Representing Australia
AFC U-20 Asian Cup
Winner	2025 China	Team
- * Club domestic league appearances and goals as of 16 August 2026 ‡ National team caps and goals as of 2 March 2025

Zach Lisolajski (Macedonian: Зак Лисолајски, romanized: Zak Lisolajski, pronounced [lisoˈlajski]; born 5 October 2005) is an Australian soccer player who recent played for A-League Men club Perth Glory and currently plays for Preston Lions in the NPL Victoria.

== Career ==
=== Early Days ===
Lisolajski started with Sydenham Park SC in the Victorian State League 1 before he signed with Newcastle Jets FC Youth in the NSW League Two.

=== Western United ===
Wishing to further his development, Lisolajski returned to Victoria and signed with fellow A-League Men academy side Western United FC Youth.

Senior A-League Men manager John Aloisi presented Lisolajski with his professional debut during the 2023-24 A-League Men January clash against Western Sydney.

=== Perth Glory ===
Lisolajski was signed by Perth Glory ahead of the 2024-25 A-League Men season on a 2-year contract.

== International career ==
Whilst playing for the Western United Academy, Lisolajski received his first call up to the Australian U-20s ahead of the Marbella Week of Football Tournament in Spain

== Honours ==
Australia U-20

- AFC U-20 Asian Cup Champions: 2025
