= 2021–22 Perth Glory FC season =

Perth Glory
2021–22 season
- Chairman: Tony Sage
- Manager: Richard Garcia (to 20 March 2022); Ruben Zadkovich (Interim) (from 21 March 2022)
- Stadium: HBF Park; UTAS Stadium; Netstrata Jubilee Stadium
- A-League Men: 12th
- FFA Cup: Play-off (2021)
- Australia Cup: Play-off (2022)
- Top goalscorer: League: Bruno Fornaroli (8 goals); All: Bruno Fornaroli (8 goals)
- Highest home attendance: 17,198 vs Adelaide United (20 November 2021)
- Lowest home attendance: 89 vs Wellington Phoenix in Sydney (13 April 2022); 2,577 vs Newcastle Jets in Perth (30 March 2022)
- Average home league attendance: 4,281; 5,793 (Note: Excluding matches played outside of Perth)

The 2021–22 Perth Glory FC season was the club's 25th season since its establishment in 1996. The club participated in the A-League Men's competition for the 17th time and the Australia Cup for the seventh and eighth time.

== Players ==
Note: Flags indicate national team as defined under FIFA eligibility rules; some limited exceptions apply. Players may hold more than one non-FIFA nationality.

No.	Pos.	Nation	Player
1	GK	AUS	Brad Jones
4	DF	AUS	Luke Bodnar
5	DF	AUS	Jonathan Aspropotamitis
6	DF	AUS	Osama Malik
7	FW	ESP	Adrián Sardinero
8	DF	JPN	Kosuke Ota
9	FW	AUS	Bruno Fornaroli
10	FW	IRL	Andy Keogh
11	FW	AUS	Nick Fitzgerald
12	GK	AUS	Cameron Cook
13	MF	AUS	Brandon O'Neill (captain)
14	DF	AUS	Jack Clisby
15	FW	ENG	Daniel Sturridge
16	DF	SRB	Darko Stanojević
18	MF	AUS	Daniel Stynes

No.	Pos.	Nation	Player
20	FW	AUS	Carlo Armiento
21	MF	AUS	Antonee Burke-Gilroy
22	DF	AUS	Joshua Rawlins
23	MF	AUS	Mitchell Oxborrow
24	MF	BDI	Pacifique Niyongabire
25	DF	AUS	Jacob Young
26	MF	AUS	Giordano Colli
28	FW	AUS	Trent Ostler (scholarship)
29	DF	CUW	Darryl Lachman
31	DF	AUS	Daniel Walsh (scholarship)
33	GK	AUS	Liam Reddy
34	MF	AUS	Callum Timmins
38	FW	AUS	Ciaran Bramwell
—	MF	AUS	Bryce Bafford

== Transfers ==
=== Transfers in ===
No.	Position	Player	Transferred from	Type/fee	Contract length	Date	Ref
14	DF	Jack Clisby	Central Coast Mariners	Free transfer	2 years	21 June 2021	
2	DF	Aaron Calver	Unattached	Free transfer	2 years	23 June 2021	
13	MF	Brandon O'Neill	Unattached	Free transfer	3 years	1 July 2021	
1	GK	Brad Jones	Unattached	Free transfer	2 years	5 August 2021	
7	FW	(Spain) Adrián Sardinero	(Greece) OFI	Undisclosed	2 years	27 August 2021	
21	DF	Antonee Burke-Gilroy	Unattached	Free transfer	2 years	1 September 2021	
24	MF	(Burundi) Pacifique Niyongabire	Unattached	Free transfer	2 years	1 September 2021	
15	FW	(England) Daniel Sturridge	Unattached	Free transfer	1 year	1 October 2021	
23	MF	Mitchell Oxborrow	Unattached	Free transfer	1 year	15 October 2021	
30	GK	Nicholas Sorras	(Australia) Sydney Olympic	Injury replacement		3 December 2021	
16	DF	(Serbia) Darko Stanojević	Unattached	Free transfer	5 months	21 January 2022	
25	DF	Jacob Young	Unattached	Free transfer	5 months	2 February 2022	
11	FW	Nick Fitzgerald	Unattached	Free transfer	5 months	11 February 2022	

==== From youth squad ====
N	Pos.	Nat.	Name	Age	Notes
38	FW	(Australia)	Ciaran Bramwell	19	

=== Transfers out ===
No.	Position	Player	Transferred to	Type/fee	Date	Ref
88	MF	Neil Kilkenny	Unattached	End of contract	13 May 2021	
18	FW	Nicholas D'Agostino	Unattached	End of contract	12 June 2021	
1	GK	Tando Velaphi	Unattached	End of contract	22 June 2021	
2	DF	Jason Geria	Unattached	End of contract	22 June 2021	
4	DF	(Germany) Sebastian Langkamp	Unattached	Mutual contract termination	22 June 2021	
15	MF	Brandon Wilson	Unattached	End of contract	22 June 2021	
16	MF	Nick Sullivan	Unattached	End of contract	22 June 2021	
23	DF	(New Zealand) Dane Ingham	Unattached	End of contract	22 June 2021	
37	DF	Riley Warland	Unattached	End of contract	22 June 2021	
11	FW	Joel Chianese	(India) Hyderabad	End of loan	22 June 2021	
7	FW	Chris Ikonomidis	Unattached	End of contract	19 July 2021	
25	DF	Nicholas Walsh	(Australia) Balcatta FC	Mutual contract termination	1 August 2021	
34	DF	Mason Tatafu	(United States) Hofstra Pride	Mutual contract termination	17 August 2021	
17	MF	(Spain) Diego Castro	Unattached	End of contract	2 October 2021	
30	GK	Nicholas Sorras	(Australia) Sydney Olympic	End of injury replacement contract	6 March 2022	
2	DF	Aaron Calver	(South Korea) Gwangju FC	Undisclosed	15 March 2022	

=== Contract extensions ===
No.	Name	Position	Duration	Date	Notes
9	Bruno Fornaroli	Forward	2 years	15 June 2021	
33	Liam Reddy	Goalkeeper	2 years	16 June 2021	
4	Luke Bodnar	Defender	2 years	17 June 2021	
34	Callum Timmins	Central midfielder	2 years	17 June 2021	
24	Daniel Stynes	Attacking midfielder	2 years	17 June 2021	
5	Jonathan Aspropotamitis	Centre-back	2 years	24 June 2021	
20	Carlo Armiento	Striker	2 years	24 June 2021	
8	(Japan) Kosuke Ota	Left-back	2 years	25 June 2021	
28	Trent Ostler	Forward	1 year	15 October 2021	scholarship
31	Daniel Walsh	Defender	1 year	15 October 2021	scholarship

== Pre-season and friendlies ==
21 September 2021	ECU Joondalup (Western Australia)	0–3	Perth Glory	Perth, Australia
19:00		Report	Stynes 1'; Zimarino 16', 37'	Stadium: Dorrien Gardens; Attendance: 1,000; Referee: Shane Skinner

2 October 2021 Gold Fields Challenge Cup	WA State Team (Western Australia)	1–0	Perth Glory	Perth, Australia
15:00	Santich 83'	Report		Stadium: Percy Doyle Reserve; Referee: Matthew Southern

== Competitions ==
Win Draw Loss Cancelled or postponed

Competition	Record							
Competition	P	W	D	L	GF	GA	GD	Win %
A-League Men	26	4	6	16	20	43	−23	15.38
FFA Cup	1	0	1	0	1	1	+0	0.00
Australia Cup	1	0	0	1	1	3	−2	0.00
Total	28	4	7	17	22	47	−25	14.29

Updated to match played 12 May 2022
Source: Competitions

=== FFA Cup ===
24 November 2021 Preliminary rounds	Perth Glory	1–1 (a.e.t.) (3–4 p)	Melbourne Victory	Adelaide
19:30 ACDT	Anasmo 26'	Report	Brooks 1'	Stadium: Marden Sports Complex; Attendance: 430; Referee: Daniel Elder
	Penalties
	Bramwell (penalty scored); Donnell (penalty scored); Coyne (penalty missed); Rawlins (penalty scored); Colli (penalty missed)		(penalty scored) Lawrie-Lattanzio; (penalty scored) Velupillay; (penalty missed) Tyson; (penalty scored) Lethlean; (penalty scored) Leban

=== Australia Cup ===
12 May 2022 Preliminary rounds	Newcastle Jets	3–1	Perth Glory	Newcastle
19:30 AEST	Elsey 25'; Penha 30'; Goodwin 90+3'	Report	Vecchio 71'	Stadium: McDonald Jones Stadium

=== A-League Men ===
==== League table ====
Pos	Team	Pld	W	D	L	GF	GA	GD	Pts	Qualification
8	Sydney FC	26	8	7	11	37	44	−7	31	
9	Newcastle Jets	26	8	5	13	45	43	+2	29	Qualification for 2022 Australia Cup play-offs (Note: The top 8 teams qualify for the round of 32, while the bottom four teams participate in a play-off round.)
10	Western Sydney Wanderers	26	6	9	11	30	38	−8	27	Qualification for 2022 Australia Cup play-offs
11	Brisbane Roar	26	7	5	14	29	39	−10	26	Qualification for 2022 Australia Cup play-offs
12	Perth Glory	26	4	6	16	20	43	−23	18	Qualification for 2022 Australia Cup play-offs

Source: A-Leagues
Rules for classification: 1) Points; 2) Goal difference; 3) Goals scored; 4) Points per game; 5) Least red cards; 6) Least yellow cards; 7) Toss of a coin in an event of a tie of two clubs.

==== Results summary ====
Overall								Home						Away					
Pld	W	D	L	GF	GA	GD	Pts	W	D	L	GF	GA	GD	W	D	L	GF	GA	GD
26	4	6	16	20	43	−23	18	2	4	7	8	15	−7	2	2	9	12	28	−16

Last updated: 4 May 2022.
Source: Ultimate A-League

==== Matches ====
20 November 2021 1	Perth Glory	1–1	Adelaide United	Perth
19:05 AWST	Fornaroli 40'	Report	Yengi 22'	Stadium: HBF Park; Attendance: 17,198; Referee: Adam Kersey

26 November 2021 2	Western United	1–0	Perth Glory	Melbourne
19:45 AEDT	Wenzel-Halls 78'	Report		Stadium: AAMI Park; Attendance: 3,013; Referee: Jonathon Barreiro

5 December 2021 3	Melbourne Victory	0–3	Perth Glory	Melbourne
18:45 AEDT		Report	Burke-Gilroy 66'; Bramwell 74'; Fornaroli 89'	Stadium: AAMI Park; Attendance: 14,122; Referee: Kurt Ams

8 December 2021 4	Melbourne City	1–0	Perth Glory	Melbourne
19:45 AEDT	Atkinson 88'	Report		Stadium: AAMI Park; Attendance: 4,081; Referee: Ben Abraham

19 January 2022 5	Brisbane Roar	1–0	Perth Glory	Brisbane
18:45 AEST	Hore 77'	Report		Stadium: Moreton Daily Stadium; Attendance: 5,639; Referee: Alireza Faghani

23 January 2022 7	Sydney FC	1–2	Perth Glory	Sydney
19:45 AEDT	Caceres 90+3' (pen.)	Report	O'Neill 55'; Fornaroli 85'	Stadium: Netstrata Jubilee Stadium; Attendance: 4,069; Referee: Adam Kersey

2 February 2022 9	Western Sydney Wanderers	1–0	Perth Glory	Sydney
19:45 AEDT	Rodwell 26'	Report		Stadium: CommBank Stadium; Attendance: 4,124; Referee: Alireza Faghani

13 February 2022 14	Central Coast Mariners	1–1	Perth Glory	Gosford
17:45 AEDT	Cummings 58'	Report	Stynes 90+3'	Stadium: Central Coast Stadium; Attendance: 3,936; Referee: Jonathon Barreiro

20 February 2022 15	Perth Glory	2–0	Brisbane Roar	Launceston
17:05 AEDT	Fornaroli 8' (pen.), 73'	Report		Stadium: UTAS Stadium; Attendance: 1,146; Referee: Daniel Elder

23 February 2022 12	Perth Glory	0–1	Macarthur FC	Launceston
19:55 AEDT		Report	Dávila 9'	Stadium: UTAS Stadium; Attendance: 723; Referee: Kurt Ams

27 February 2022 16	Perth Glory	0–2	Western United	Launceston
19:05 AWST		Report	Prijović 37'; Pierias 56'	Stadium: UTAS Stadium; Attendance: 1,552; Referee: Jonathon Barreiro

2 March 2022 13	Melbourne City	2–2	Perth Glory	Melbourne
19:05 AEDT	Berenguer 8'; Leckie 29'	Report	Fornaroli 31'; Timmins 56'	Stadium: AAMI Park; Attendance: 2,584; Referee: Alex King

6 March 2022 17	Perth Glory	1–2	Adelaide United	Perth
16:05 AWST	Fornaroli 90+1' (pen.)	Report	Ibusuki 45+1'; Toure 59'	Stadium: HBF Park; Attendance: 6,657; Referee: Alireza Faghani

12 March 2022 26	Perth Glory	0–2	Sydney FC	Perth
16:05 AWST		Report	Barbarouses 7'; Yazbek 70'	Stadium: HBF Park; Attendance: 4,708; Referee: Jack Morgan

15 March 2022 18	Perth Glory	0–0	Central Coast Mariners	Perth
19:05 AWST		Report		Stadium: HBF Park; Attendance: 3,078; Referee: Alex King

19 March 2022 19	Perth Glory	1–4	Brisbane Roar	Perth
19:45 AWST	Stynes 90+2'	Report	Lescano 40', 58'; O'Shea 81' (pen.); Ivanovic 89'	Stadium: HBF Park; Attendance: 4,593; Referee: Adam Kersey

26 March 2022 20	Wellington Phoenix	2–1	Perth Glory	Sydney
17:05 AEDT	Waine 37'; Pennington 90+7'	Report	Fitzgerald 49'	Stadium: Leichhardt Oval; Attendance: 168; Referee: Kurt Ams

30 March 2022 11	Perth Glory	0–0	Newcastle Jets	Perth
18:40 AWST		Report		Stadium: HBF Park; Attendance: 2,577; Referee: Daniel Elder

3 April 2022 8	Macarthur FC	4–2	Perth Glory	Sydney
18:20 AEST	Dávila 38' (pen.); Noone 54' (pen.); Toure 82'; Najjar 90+6'	Report	Colli 1'; Ostler 18'	Stadium: Campbelltown Stadium; Attendance: 2,357; Referee: Jonathon Barreiro

6 April 2022 22	Perth Glory	0–1	Melbourne Victory	Perth
19:05 AWST		Report	Margiotta 57'	Stadium: HBF Park; Attendance: 3,342; Referee: Tim Danaskos

10 April 2022 23	Newcastle Jets	6–1	Perth Glory	Newcastle
16:05 AEDT	Penha 21', 50'; Mikeltadze 31', 37', 78' (pen.); Yuel 81'	Report	Bramwell 69'	Stadium: McDonald Jones Stadium; Attendance: 4,643; Referee: Stephen Lucas

13 April 2022 10	Perth Glory	0–1	Wellington Phoenix	Sydney
19:05 AEDT		Report	Sandoval 48'	Stadium: Netstrata Jubilee Stadium; Attendance: 89; Referee: Lachlan Keevers

16 April 2022 24	Western United	6–0	Perth Glory	Launceston
17:05 AEST	Wales 25', 27', 45+3'; Pierias 34'; Prijović 52' (pen.); Wenzel-Halls 83'	Report		Stadium: UTAS Stadium; Attendance: 2,231; Referee: Ben Abraham

24 April 2022 6	Adelaide United	2–0	Perth Glory	Adelaide
16:35 ACST	Bernardo 24'; Irankunda 90+4'	Report		Stadium: Coopers Stadium; Attendance: 7,387; Referee: Jack Morgan

30 April 2022 21	Perth Glory	1–1	Western Sydney Wanderers	Perth
17:45 AWST	Fornaroli 18'	Report	Ogawa 78'	Stadium: HBF Park; Attendance: 6,893; Referee: Casey Reibelt

4 May 2022 25	Perth Glory	2–0	Melbourne City	Perth
19:05 AWST	Timmins 5', 67'	Report		Stadium: HBF Park; Attendance: 3,095; Referee: Alex King

== Statistics ==
Players with no appearances not included in the list.

=== Appearances and goals ===
No.	Pos.	Nat.	Name	A-League Men		2021 FFA Cup play-off		2022 Australia Cup play-off		Total	
No.	Pos.	Nat.	Name	Apps	Goals	Apps	Goals	Apps	Goals	Apps	Goals
1	GK	(Australia)	Brad Jones	5	0	0	0	0	0	5	0
4	DF	(Australia)	Luke Bodnar	4	0	0	0	0	0	4	0
5	DF	(Australia)	Jonathan Aspropotamitis	13	0	0	0	0	0	13	0
6	MF	(Australia)	Osama Malik	4(5)	0	0	0	0	0	9	0
7	MF	(Spain)	Adrián Sardinero	12(4)	0	0	0	0	0	16	0
8	DF	(Japan)	Kosuke Ota	11	0	0	0	0	0	11	0
9	FW	(Australia)	Bruno Fornaroli	16	8	0	0	0	0	16	8
10	FW	(Republic of Ireland)	Andy Keogh	6(5)	0	0	0	0	0	11	0
11	FW	(Australia)	Nick Fitzgerald	12(1)	1	0	0	0	0	13	1
12	GK	(Australia)	Cameron Cook	6(1)	0	1	0	0	0	8	0
13	MF	(Australia)	Brandon O'Neill	8(2)	1	0	0	0	0	10	1
14	DF	(Australia)	Jack Clisby	18(2)	0	0	0	0	0	20	0
15	FW	(England)	Daniel Sturridge	1(5)	0	0	0	0	0	6	0
16	MF	(Serbia)	Darko Stanojević	0(1)	0	0	0	0	0	1	0
18	MF	(Australia)	Daniel Stynes	9(11)	2	0	0	0	0	20	2
19	MF	(Australia)	Callum Timmins	17(5)	3	0	0	1	0	23	3
21	MF	(Australia)	Antonee Burke-Gilroy	22(3)	1	0	0	0	0	25	1
22	DF	(Australia)	Joshua Rawlins	15(7)	0	0(1)	0	1	0	24	0
23	MF	(Australia)	Mitchell Oxborrow	12(2)	0	0	0	0	0	14	0
24	MF	(Burundi)	Pacifique Niyongabire	8(9)	0	0	0	0(1)	0	18	0
25	DF	(Australia)	Jacob Young	0(2)	0	0	0	0	0	2	0
26	MF	(Australia)	Giordano Colli	13(7)	1	1	0	1	0	22	1
28	MF	(Australia)	Trent Ostler	4(1)	1	0	0	1	0	6	1
29	DF	(Curaçao)	Darryl Lachman	26	0	0	0	1	0	27	0
32	DF	(Australia)	Aidan Coyne	3(2)	0	1	0	0(1)	0	7	0
33	GK	(Australia)	Liam Reddy	15	0	0	0	1	0	16	0
35	DF	(Australia)	William Formston	0	0	1	0	0	0	1	0
36	DF	(Australia)	Joseph Forde	3(3)	0	1	0	1	0	8	0
37	DF	(Australia)	Jacob Muir	5	0	1	0	1	0	7	0
38	FW	(Australia)	Ciaran Bramwell	4(11)	2	0(1)	0	0	0	16	2
39	MF	(Australia)	Matthew George	0	0	0(1)	0	0	0	1	0
41	MF	(Australia)	Chris Donnell	1(2)	0	1	0	1	0	5	0
42	FW	(Australia)	Joshua Anasmo	2(6)	0	1	1	0(1)	0	10	1
43	FW	(Australia)	Adam Zimarino	1(6)	0	1	0	1	0	9	0
45	MF	(Australia)	Aidan Edwards	0(2)	0	1	0	1	0	4	0
47	MF	(Australia)	Tyler Vecchio	1(7)	0	1	0	0(1)	1	10	1
49	MF	(Australia)	Jayden Leader	0	0	0(1)	0	0	0	1	0
88	FW	(Australia)	Jayden Gorman	1(1)	0	0	0	0	0	2	0
–	FW	(Australia)	Judd McDougall	0	0	0(1)	0	0	0	1	0
Players no longer at the club this season
2	DF	(Australia)	Aaron Calver	8(2)	0	0	0	0	0	10	0
