= 2021 FFA Cup preliminary rounds =

Qualification rounds for 2021 season of Australian soccer competition

Tournament details
- Country: Australia
- Teams: 765

The 2021 FFA Cup preliminary rounds were the qualifying competition to decide 23 of the 32 teams to take part in the 2021 FFA Cup (now known as the Australia Cup). The competition commenced in February and was completed in November.

== Schedule ==
The fixtures for the competition were as follows.

Round	Number of fixtures	Clubs	A-League	ACT	NSW	NNSW	NT	QLD	SA	TAS	VIC	WA
Qualifying round	27 + 1 bye	765 → 738	–	–	–	–	–	–	–	–	20–21 Feb	–
First round	38	738 → 700	–	–	–	–	–	–	–	–	27 Feb	–
Second round	147 + 52 byes	700 → 553	–	–	6–30 Mar	14–26 Mar	–	12 Feb–13 Mar	–	–	6–7 Mar	20 Feb–7 Mar
Third round	207 + 6 byes	553 → 346	–	10–14 Mar	14 Mar–6 Apr	20 Mar–7 Apr	–	19 Feb–27 Mar	24–28 Mar	8 Mar	12–15 Mar	19–27 Mar
Fourth round	165 + 1 bye	346 → 181	–	22 Mar–4 Apr	13–21 Apr	28 Apr–19 May	30 Mar–12 May	3–4 Apr	23–25 Apr	2–5 Apr	2–5 Apr	30 Mar–13 Apr
Fifth round	84	181 → 97	–	28 Apr–5 May	27 Apr–5 May	18–26 May	27 Apr–18 May	20 Mar–25 Apr	14–16 May	1–2 May	27 Apr–22 Jun	15–19 May
Sixth round	42	97 → 55	–	19–26 May	11–26 May	12 Jun	25 May–5 Jun	27 Mar–26 May	8–9 Jun	29–30 May	25 May–29 Jun	1–2 Jun
Seventh round	21	55 → 34	–	5 Jun	2–16 Jun	14–23 Jun	22 Jun	19–20 Jun	21–27 Jun	14 Jun	6–7 Jul	22–23 Jun
Play-off round	2	34 → 32	13–24 Nov	–	–	–	–	–	–	–	–	–

- Some round dates in respective Federations overlap due to separate scheduling of zones.

== Format ==
There were changes to the make-up of the entrants compared to the 2019 edition, with South Australia's qualifying places increasing from 1 to 2, and NSW losing one place. Additionally, the top eight placed A-League clubs for the 2020–21 A-League season gained automatic qualification to the Round of 32. The remaining four teams competed in a play-off series for the remaining two positions.

The preliminary rounds structures were as follows, and refer to the different levels in the unofficial Australian soccer league system:

- Qualifying round:

- 55 Victorian clubs from level 9 and from regional leagues entered at this stage.

- First round:

- 76 Victorian clubs (28 from the previous round and 48 teams from level 8) entered at this stage.

- Second round:

- 122 New South Wales clubs level 6 and below entered this stage.
- 46 Northern New South Wales clubs level 4 and below entered this stage.
- 87 Queensland clubs (level 4 and below) entered this stage.
- 62 Victorian clubs (38 from the previous round and 24 teams from level 7) entered this stage.
- 24 Western Australian clubs from level 5 and below, including from regional leagues, entered this stage.

- Third round:

- 13 Australian Capital Territory clubs from level 3 and below entered this stage.
- 90 New South Wales Clubs (67 from the previous round and 23 teams from levels 4–5) entered this stage.
- 44 Northern New South Wales clubs (33 from the previous round and 11 level 3) entered this stage.
- 76 Queensland clubs (50 from the previous round and 26 teams from level 4 and below) entered this stage.
- 41 South Australian clubs from level 3 and below entered this stage.
- 12 Tasmanian clubs from level 3 and below entered this stage.
- 100 Victorian clubs (31 from the previous round and 69 teams from levels 3–6) entered this stage.
- 42 Western Australian clubs (12 from the previous round and 30 teams from levels 3 and 4) entered this stage.

- Fourth round:

- 16 Australian Capital Territory clubs (8 from the previous round and 8 teams from level 2) entered this stage.
- 64 New South Wales Clubs (45 from the previous round and 19 teams from levels 2–3) entered this stage.
- 32 Northern New South Wales clubs (22 from the previous round and 10 level 2) entered this stage.
- 11 Northern Territory clubs (7 from Norzone (Darwin) and 4 from FICA (Alice Springs)) from levels 2–3 entered this stage.
- 64 Queensland clubs (39 from the previous round and 25 teams from level 2 and 3) entered this stage.
- 32 South Australian clubs (21 from the previous round and 11 teams from level 2) entered this stage.
- 16 Tasmanian clubs (6 from the previous round and 10 teams from level 2 and 3) entered this stage.
- 64 Victorian clubs (50 from the previous round and 14 teams from level 2) entered this stage.
- 32 Western Australian clubs (21 from the previous round and 11 teams from level 2) entered this stage.

- Fifth round:

- 8 Australian Capital Territory clubs progressed to this stage.
- 32 New South Wales clubs progressed to this stage.
- 16 Northern New South Wales clubs progressed to this stage.
- 8 Northern Territory clubs (6 from the previous round and 2 Norzone (Darwin) teams from level 2) entered this stage.
- 32 Queensland clubs progressed to this stage.
- 16 South Australian clubs progressed to this stage.
- 8 Tasmanian clubs progressed to this stage.
- 32 Victorian clubs progressed to this stage.
- 16 Western Australian clubs progressed to this stage.

- Sixth round:

- 4 Australian Capital Territory clubs progressed to this stage.
- 16 New South Wales clubs progressed to this stage.
- 8 Northern New South Wales clubs progressed to this stage.
- 4 Northern Territory clubs progressed to this stage.
- 16 Queensland clubs progressed to this stage.
- 8 South Australian clubs progressed to this stage.
- 4 Tasmanian clubs progressed to this stage.
- 16 Victorian clubs progressed to this stage.
- 8 Western Australian clubs progressed to this stage.

- Seventh round:

- 2 Australian Capital Territory clubs progressed to this stage, which doubled as the Final of the Federation Cup.
- 8 New South Wales clubs progressed to this stage.
- 4 Northern New South Wales clubs progressed to this stage.
- 2 Northern Territory clubs progressed to this stage, which doubled as the NT FFA Cup Final.
- 8 Queensland clubs progressed to this stage; 2 from Central and North Queensland, and 6 from South East Queensland.
- 4 South Australian clubs progressed to this stage. The 2 winners also participated in the Grand Final of the Federation Cup.
- 2 Tasmanian clubs progressed to this stage, which doubled as the Grand Final of the Milan Lakoseljac Cup.
- 8 Victorian clubs progressed to this stage. The 4 winners also qualified to the final rounds of the Dockerty Cup.
- 4 Western Australian clubs progressed to this stage. The 2 winners also participated in the Final of the Football West State Cup.

- Play-off round:

- The four lowest-ranked teams in the 2020–21 A-League played-off for two spots in the Round of 32.

== Key to abbreviations ==
Federation	Zone
ACT = Australian Capital Territory	
NSW = New South Wales	
NNSW = Northern New South Wales	NTH = North; STH = South
NT = Northern Territory	ASP = Alice Springs; DAR = Darwin
QLD = Queensland	CQ = Central Queensland; FNQ = Far North Queensland; MR = Mackay Region; NQ = North Queensland; SEQ = South East Queensland; WB = Wide Bay
SA = South Australia	
TAS = Tasmania	
VIC = Victoria	
WA = Western Australia	

== Qualifying round ==
The draw for the qualifying round was conducted on 4 February 2021. A total of 55 clubs from Men's State League 5, Bendigo Amateur Soccer League, Ballarat & District Soccer Association, Sunraysia, Metropolitan League, and Latrobe Valley Soccer League in Victoria entered at this stage.

Fed.	Zone	Tie no	Home team (Tier)	Score	Away team (Tier)
Victoria
VIC	–	1	Aspendale SC (9)	0–6	Bundoora United (9)
VIC	–	2	Ballarat SC (9)	2–2†	Glen Waverley (9)
Glen Waverley advance 4–3 on penalties
VIC	–	3	Casey Panthers (9)	w/o	White Star Dandenong (9)
VIC	–	4	Endeavour Hills (9)	1–4	Surfside Waves (10)
VIC	–	5	Glenroy Lions (9)	6–1	Glen Eira (9)
VIC	–	6	Albert Park (9)	w/o	Macedon Blues United (9)
VIC	–	7	Hampton Park United Sparrows (9)	5–0	Maribyrnong Greens (9)
VIC	–	8	Mildura City (10)	4–2	Shepparton South (10)
VIC	–	9	Falcons 2000 (10)	6–1	Bacchus Marsh (10)
VIC	–	10	Deakin Ducks (9)	3–0	Old Trinity Grammarians (9)
VIC	–	11	Tullamarine FC (9)	1–3	Moonee Valley Knights (9)
VIC	–	12	Melton Phoenix (9)	7–0	Wyndham FC (9)
VIC	–	13	Lilydale Montrose United (9)	w/o	Daylesford & Hepburn United (10)

Fed.	Zone	Tie no	Home team (Tier)	Score	Away team (Tier)
VIC	–	14	Old Ivanhoe (9)	0–3	Mount Waverley City (9)
VIC	–	15	Knox United (9)	0–2	Yarra Jets (9)
VIC	–	16	Balmoral FC (9)	5–0	Alphington FC (9)
VIC	–	17	Moama-Echuca Border Raiders (10)	w/o	Melbourne Lions (9)
VIC	–	18	Bunyip District (9)	3–1	West Point (9)
VIC	–	19	Keon Park (9)	w/o	Old Mentonians (10)
VIC	–	20	Pakenham United (9)	w/o	South East United (9)
VIC	–	21	Spring Gully United (11)	0–5	Barwon SC (10)
VIC	–	22	Mount Martha (9)	2–5	East Kew (9)
VIC	–	23	Old Melburnians (9)	1–1†	Keilor Wolves (9)
Keilor Wolves advance 5–4 on penalties
VIC	–	24	Maidstone United (9)	3–2	Boronia SC (9)
VIC	–	25	St Kevins Old Boys (9)	6–1	Mitchell Rangers (9)
VIC	–	26	Barton United (11)	3–0	Meadow Park (9)
VIC	–	27	Rosebud SC (9)	1–2	Lara United (9)

Notes

- w/o = Walkover
- † = After Extra Time
- VIC Byes – Tatura SC (10).

== First round ==
Fed.	Zone	Tie no	Home team (Tier)	Score	Away team (Tier)
Victoria
VIC	–	1	Laverton FC (8)	w/o	FC Noble Hurricanes (8)
VIC	–	2	Lilydale Montrose United (9)	w/o	Melbourne Lions SC (8)
VIC	–	3	Brunswick Juventus Junior (8)	w/o	Reservoir Yeti SC (8)
VIC	–	4	Mount Waverley City (9)	w/o	RMIT FC (8)
VIC	–	5	Greenvale United (8)	4–1	Sandringham SC (8)
VIC	–	6	Yarra Jets (9)	1–5	Westside Strikers Caroline Springs (8)
VIC	–	7	Ringwood City (8)	3–2	Bunyip District (9)
VIC	–	8	Macedon Blues United (9)	6–3	Hampton Park United Sparrows (9)
VIC	–	9	Balmoral FC (9)	0–4	Melbourne University (8)
VIC	–	10	St Kevins Old Boys (9)	1–0	Barton United (11)
VIC	–	11	Plenty Valley Lions (8)	5–0	Old Xaverians (8)
VIC	–	12	Bundoora United (9)	2–0	Endeavour United (8)
VIC	–	13	Northern Falcons (8)	3–2	Dingley Stars (8)
VIC	–	14	Mildura City (10)	0–2	Chisholm United (8)
VIC	–	15	Lara United (9)	3–2†	Waverley Wanderers (8)
VIC	–	16	Sandown Lions (8)	3–3†	Old Mentonians SC (10)
Sandown Lions advance 4–3 on penalties
VIC	–	17	Noble Park United (8)	4–1	Barwon SC (10)
VIC	–	18	Pakenham United (9)	3–4	Keilor Wolves (9)
VIC	–	19	Marcellin Old Collegians (8)	2–0	Old Camberwell Grammar (8)

Fed.	Zone	Tie no	Home team (Tier)	Score	Away team (Tier)
VIC	–	20	Moama-Echuca Border Raiders (10)	w/o	Barnstoneworth United (8)
VIC	–	21	Moonee Valley Knights (9)	1–1†	La Trobe University (8)
Moonee Valley Knights advance 5–4 on penalties
VIC	–	22	Springvale City (8)	1–4	Gisborne SC (8)
VIC	–	23	Darebin United (8)	4–2	Chelsea FC (8)
VIC	–	24	Kings Domain (8)	1–4	Monash City Villarreal (8)
VIC	–	25	North Melbourne Athletic (8)	1–2	Somerville Eagles (8)
VIC	–	26	Seaford United (8)	2–0	Baxter SC (8)
VIC	–	27	Maidstone United (9)	3–1	Lyndale United (8)
VIC	–	28	Uni Hill Eagles (8)	w/o	Glen Waverley (9)
VIC	–	29	Casey Panthers (9)	2–3†	Riversdale SC (8)
VIC	–	30	Melbourne City (8)	2–3	East Kew (9)
VIC	–	31	Watsonia Heights (8)	5–2	Surfside Waves (10)
VIC	–	32	Melton Phoenix (9)	1–3	Croydon City (8)
VIC	–	33	Bell Park (8)	w/o	Falcons 2000 (10)
VIC	–	34	West Preston (8)	w/o	Keysborough SC (8)
VIC	–	35	Deakin Ducks (9)	2–0	Tatura SC (10)
VIC	–	36	Noble Park (8)	w/o	Golden Plains (8)
VIC	–	37	Surf Coast (8)	w/o	Spring Hills (8)
VIC	–	38	Thornbury Athletic (8)	2–2†	Glenroy Lions (9)
Glenroy Lions advance 4–3 on penalties

Notes

- w/o = Walkover
- † = After Extra Time

== Second round ==
Fed.	Zone	Tie no	Home team (Tier)	Score	Away team (Tier)
New South Wales
NSW	–	1	University of Wollongong (7)	0–1	Bulli FC (6)
NSW	–	2	Belrose Terrey Hills (6)	2–1	Bass Hill Rangers (6)
NSW	–	3	Rouse Hill Rams (6)	8–0	Marulan FC (6)
NSW	–	4	Coogee United (6)	2–0	Wyoming FC (6)
NSW	–	5	FC Eagles Sydney (6)	3–2†	Pagewood Botany (6)
NSW	–	6	Berowra FC (6)	4–3†	Doonside Hawks (6)
NSW	–	7	Coniston FC (6)	2–0	Gunners SC (6)
NSW	–	8	Brookvale FC (6)	3–1	West Pennant Hills Cherrybrook (6)
NSW	–	9	Shoalhaven United (6)	4–3	North Sydney United (6)
NSW	–	10	Ryde Saints United (6)	8–0	Blaxland FC (6)
NSW	–	11	Manly Vale (6)	2–2†	Kiama Quarries (7)
Manly Vale advance 3–0 on penalties
NSW	–	12	Menai Hawks (6)	3–0	Western Condors (6)
NSW	–	13	Cooks River Titans (8)	0–3	Marayong FC (6)
NSW	–	14	Albion Park City (8)	0–5	Glebe Gorillas (6)
NSW	–	15	Horsley Park United (8)	w/o	Unanderra Hearts (7)
NSW	–	16	Scots FC (6)	3–2	Picton Rangers (7)
NSW	–	17	Young Lions (6)	0–7	Randwick City (6)
NSW	–	18	Liverpool Rangers (8)	1–3	Forest Rangers (6)
NSW	–	19	Budgewoi FC (7)	2–3	Arncliffe Aurora (6)
NSW	–	20	Peakhurst United (6)	2–1	Balmain & District (8)
NSW	–	21	Maroubra United (6)	2–0	Springwood United (6)
NSW	–	22	Lugarno FC (6)	4–2	Shell Cove (7)
NSW	–	23	Kissing Point (7)	5–2	Winston Hills (6)
NSW	–	24	Quakers Hill Juniors (6)	0–1	Enfield Rovers (6)
NSW	–	25	Revesby Workers (6)	2–3	UTS FC (7)
NSW	–	26	Sydney Coolong (7)	5–2†	FC Five Dock (10)
NSW	–	27	Chatswood Rangers (6)	3–2	Castle Hill United (6)
NSW	–	28	Camden Falcons (7)	1–0	Harrington United (6)
NSW	–	29	Southern & Ettalong (6)	4–3†	Normanhurst Eagles (6)
NSW	–	30	Castle Hill RSL Rockets (6)	2–4†	Sans Souci (6)
NSW	–	31	Gladesville Ravens (7)	2–0†	Barnstoneworth United (8)
NSW	–	32	Padstow Hornets (6)	4–1	Eastern Creek Pioneer (7)
NSW	–	33	Phoenix FC (6)	8–1	Coptic United (7)
NSW	–	34	Hornsby Heights (7)	3–1	North Rocks (6)
NSW	–	35	Carlton Rovers (6)	4–1	ACU FC (6)
NSW	–	36	Abbotsford Juniors (6)	3–0	Sydney Rangers (8)
NSW	–	37	Fairfield Patrician Brothers (6)	0–3	Kenthurst & District (6)
NSW	–	38	Tarrawanna Blues (6)	2–0	Kellyville Kolts (6)
NSW	–	39	The Ponds (6)	0–1†	Wollongong United (6)
NSW	–	40	Albion Park White Eagles (6)	5–1	Hurstville City Minotaurs (6)
NSW	–	41	Glenwood Redbacks (7)	0–1	Pennant Hills (6)
NSW	–	42	Moorebank Sports SC (6)	2–2†	Narellan Rangers (6)
Moorebank Sports SC advance 6–5 on penalties
NSW	–	43	Polonia FC (6)	1–5	Fairfield Bulls (6)
NSW	–	44	IFS Community Wolves (9)	2–1	St Marys (8)
NSW	–	45	Coledale Waves (8)	5–4†	Panorama FC (6)
NSW	–	46	Norwest FC (7)	1–4	Terrigal United (6)
NSW	–	47	Turramurra United (7)	1–2†	Parklea SFC (6)
NSW	–	48	Baulkham Hills (6)	2–2†	Penrith Rovers (6)
Baulkham Hills advance 4–3 on penalties
NSW	–	49	Lindfield FC (6)	2–0	Central City Wolves (6)
NSW	–	50	Georges River Thistles (6)	3–3†	North Ryde (7)
Georges River Thistles advance 3–2 on penalties
NSW	–	51	Bankstown Sports Strikers (6)	8–0	Oatley FC (6)
NSW	–	52	Connells Point Rovers (6)	5–0	Hinchinbrook Sports Club (12)
NSW	–	53	Cringila Lions (6)	10–2	Putney Rangers (7)
NSW	–	54	Waverley Old Boys (6)	2–2†	Banksia Tigers (6)
Banksia Tigers advance 6–5 on penalties
NSW	–	55	Kemps Creek United (6)	7–0	Lilli Pilli (6)
Northern New South Wales
NNSW	NTH	56	Byron Bay (4)	w/o	Pacific Palms Panthers (6)
NNSW	STH	57	Kotara South (4)	3–3†	Hamilton Azzurri (4)
Kotara South advance 3–1 on penalties
NNSW	STH	58	Stockton Sharks (5)	1–4	Greta Branxton (6)
NNSW	STH	59	Kurri Kurri Junior (7)	3–1	Morisset United (7)
NNSW	STH	60	Cardiff City (4)	1–5	Newcastle Suns (4)
NNSW	STH	61	Charlestown Junior (7)	1–3	Minmi Wanderers (6)
NNSW	STH	62	Mayfield United Senior (4)	3–3†	Barnsley United (5)
Mayfield United Senior advance 5–4 on penalties
NNSW	STH	63	Muswellbrook FC (7)	0–6	Lake Macquarie Junior (7)
NNSW	STH	64	Merewether Advance (5)	4–2	North United Wolves (6)
NNSW	STH	65	University of Newcastle (5)	0–0†	South Maitland (6)
University of Newcastle advance 6–5 on penalties
NNSW	STH	66	Metford Cobras (8)	0–15	Warners Bay (4)
NNSW	STH	67	Dudley Redhead United Senior (4)	2–1	Swansea FC (4)
NNSW	STH	68	Westlakes Wildcats (5)	8–1	Gresford Vacy (8)
Queensland
QLD	WB	69	Across The Waves (5)	1–0	Kawungan Sandy Straits Jets (5)
QLD	WB	70	Granville FC (5)	w/o	United Park Eagles (5)

Fed.	Zone	Tie no	Home team (Tier)	Score	Away team (Tier)
QLD	CQ	71	Berserker Southside (5)	0–10	Clinton FC (6)
QLD	CQ	72	Nerimbera FC (5)	1–4	Frenchville FC (5)
QLD	SEQ	73	Redcliffe PCYC (7)	0–5	Surfers Paradise Apollo (5)
QLD	SEQ	74	Bayside United (5)	3–0	Runaway Bay (6)
QLD	SEQ	75	Newmarket SFC (6)	5–3	Beerwah Glasshouse United (5)
QLD	SEQ	76	Kawana SC (5)	0–3	West Wanderers (5)
QLD	SEQ	77	Ridge Hills (8)	0–3	Tarragindi Tigers (8)
QLD	SEQ	78	Pine Hills (6)	5–2	Robina City (5)
QLD	SEQ	79	Moggill FC (7)	7–0	Gatton Redbacks FC (5)
QLD	SEQ	80	Nerang Soccer Club (5)	11–0	Bribie Island Tigers (7)
QLD	SEQ	81	AC Carina (6)	2–0	Noosa Lions (5)
QLD	SEQ	82	Acacia Ridge (5)	5–3†	Tamborine Mountain Eagles (7)
QLD	SEQ	83	Clairvaux (7)	3–4	Western Spirit (5)
QLD	SEQ	84	Logan Village Falcons (8)	0–3	Woombye Snakes (5)
QLD	SEQ	85	Springfield United (7)	0–5	Nambour Yandina United (5)
QLD	SEQ	86	Ipswich City (6)	3–2	Slacks Creek (6)
QLD	SEQ	87	Caloundra FC (5)	2–1	Coolum FC (5)
QLD	SEQ	88	Bardon Latrobe (7)	4–6†	Brisbane Knights (5)
QLD	SEQ	89	Garden City Raiders (5)	0–4	Mt Gravatt Hawks (5)
QLD	SEQ	90	Centenary Stormers (5)	4–2	UQFC (6)
QLD	SEQ	91	Kangaroo Point Rovers (7)	3–1	Jimboomba United (8)
QLD	SEQ	92	Tweed United (6)	0–6	Palm Beach (5)
QLD	SEQ	93	Narangba Eagles (7)	1–2	Annerley FC (6)
QLD	SEQ	94	North Brisbane (7)	0–4	The Lakes (5)
QLD	SEQ	95	Pacific Pines (6)	2–5	North Pine (6)
QLD	SEQ	96	Albany Creek Excelsior (5)	7–2	Bethania Rams (8)
QLD	SEQ	97	Maroochydore FC (5)	3–4†	Willowburn FC (5)
QLD	SEQ	98	New Farm United (6)	15–0	Teviot Downs (8)
QLD	SEQ	99	USQFC (5)	0–5	Brighton Bulldogs (8)
QLD	SEQ	100	Kingscliff District (6)	7–1	Westside Grovely (7)
QLD	SEQ	101	Rockville Rovers (5)	w/o	North Lakes Mustangs FC (7)
QLD	SEQ	102	St. George Willawong (5)	1–0	Musgrave Mustangs (6)
QLD	SEQ	103	Toowong FC (5)	4–0	Park Ridge (8)
QLD	SEQ	104	Southport SC (5)	6–1	Oxley United (7)
Victoria
VIC	–	105	Westvale SC (7)	w/o	Somerville Eagles (8)
VIC	–	106	Moama-Echuca Border Raiders (10)	w/o	Williamstown SC (7)
VIC	–	107	Lilydale Montrose United (9)	w/o	Fawkner SC (7)
VIC	–	108	Sandown Lions (8)	1–7	Middle Park (7)
VIC	–	109	Brighton SC (7)	w/o	Plenty Valley Lions (8)
VIC	–	110	East Kew (9)	4–1	Seaford United (8)
VIC	–	111	Craigieburn City (7)	0–4	Westside Strikers Caroline Springs (8)
VIC	–	112	Melbourne University (8)	0–2	Brunswick Juventus Junior (8)
VIC	–	113	Point Cook (7)	6–1	St Kevins Old Boys (9)
VIC	–	114	Darebin United (8)	4–2	Chisholm United (8)
VIC	–	115	West Preston (8)	3–2	Mount Waverley City (9)
VIC	–	116	Elwood City (7)	0–1	Altona North (7)
VIC	–	117	Lara United (9)	1–2	Sebastopol Vikings (7)
VIC	–	118	Whitehorse United (7)	2–0	Riversdale SC (8)
VIC	–	119	Monash City Villareal (7)	1–2†	Greenvale United (8)
VIC	–	120	Golden Plains (8)	0–3	Upfield SC (7)
VIC	–	121	Surf Coast (8)	0–1	Rowville Eagles (7)
VIC	–	122	Bell Park (8)	0–1	Monash University (7)
VIC	–	123	Keilor Wolves (9)	0–1	South Yarra (7)
VIC	–	124	Heidelberg Eagles (7)	1–2	Watsonia Heights (8)
VIC	–	125	Glen Waverley (9)	3–1	Laverton FC (8)
VIC	–	126	Macedon Blues United (9)	1–2	Essendon United (7)
VIC	–	127	Noble Park United (8)	1–2	Sunbury United (7)
VIC	–	128	Diamond Valley United (7)	0–7	Bundoora United (9)
VIC	–	129	Glenroy Lions (9)	4–3†	Moonee Valley Knights (9)
VIC	–	130	Bayside Argonauts (7)	1–2	Deakin Ducks (9)
VIC	–	131	Maidstone United (9)	2–0	Gisborne SC (8)
VIC	–	132	Ashburton United (7)	0–3	Western Eagles (7)
VIC	–	133	Croydon City (8)	1–3	Marcellin Old Collegians (8)
VIC	–	134	East Brighton United (7)	0–2	Frankston Pines (7)
VIC	–	135	Ringwood City (8)	1–0	Northern Falcons (8)
Western Australia
WA	–	136	Bunbury Dynamos (10)	1–2	Busselton City (10)
WA	–	137	Jaguar FC (5)	8–0	Alexander Florina (11)
WA	–	138	Maccabi SC (8)	2–4	Kwinana United (5)
WA	–	139	Woodvale FC (8)	0–3	Ellenbrook United (6)
WA	–	140	North Beach (6)	5–1	Wembley Downs (5)
WA	–	141	Maddington White City (5)	3–0	Kalamunda United (8)
WA	–	142	Twin City Saints (10)	4–5	Greyhounds CSC (10)
WA	–	143	Port Kennedy (6)	1–1	East Perth (7)
East Perth advance 5–4 on penalties
WA	–	144	Dunsborough Towners (10)	1–1	South Perth United (6)
South Perth United advance 4–3 on penalties
WA	–	145	Yanchep United (9)	4–6	Joondanna Blues (10)
WA	–	146	Chipolopolo WAFC (10)	0–9	North Perth United (5)
WA	–	147	Perth Hills United (7)	0–9	Football Margaret River (10)

Notes

- w/o = Walkover
- † = After Extra Time
- NSW Byes – Forest Killarney (7), Glenmore Park (6), Glory FC (6), Hills Spirit (8), Holroyd Rangers (6), Lane Cove (7), Lithgow Workmens (6), Liverpool Olympic (6), Roselands FC (6), St. Patrick's FC (6), West Ryde Rovers (6), Wollongong Olympic (6).
- NNSW Byes – Bellingen FC (5), Beresfield United Seniors (4), Boambee Bombers (4), Bolwarra Lorn (6), Camden Haven Redbacks (5), Coffs City United (4), Coffs Coast Tigers (4), Garden Suburb (5), Kempsey Saints (4), Macleay Valley Rangers (4), Mayfield United Junior (7), Nambucca Strikers (5), Nelson Bay (6), Northern Storm (4), Oxley Vale Attunga (4), Port Macquarie United (4), Port Saints (4), Sawtell FC (4), Taree Wildcats (4), Westlawn Tigers (4).
- QLD Byes – Bluebirds United (5), Brisbane Athletic (6), Buderim Wanderers (5), Burleigh Heads (5), Capricorn Coast (5), S.C. Corinthians (5), Gympie United (5), Logan Metro (6), Ormeau FC (8), Pine Rivers Athletic (8), Ripley Valley (6), Tallebudgera Valley (8), The Gap (5), Tinana FC (6).
- WA Byes – Bunbury United (10), Hamersley Rovers (5), Northern City (9), Perth AFC (8), Riverside CFC (10), South West Phoenix (5).

== Third round ==
Fed.	Zone	Tie no	Home team (Tier)	Score	Away team (Tier)
Australian Capital Territory
ACT	–	1	Gungahlin Juventus (6)	0–6	Yoogali SC (3)
ACT	–	2	ANU (3)	1–2	O'Connor Knights (3)
ACT	–	3	Woden Valley (4)	1–6	Weston Molonglo (3)
ACT	–	4	Wagga City Wanderers (3)	2–1	Majura FC (7)
ACT	–	5	Canberra White Eagles (3)	0–2	Belnorth FC (6)
New South Wales
NSW	–	6	Western NSW FC (5)	5–2	Gladesville Ravens (7)
NSW	–	7	Lithgow Workmens (6)	0–5	Kissing Point (7)
NSW	–	8	Tarrawanna Blues (6)	6–1	Belrose Terrey Hills (6)
NSW	–	9	Dunbar Rovers (4)	0–2	Glebe Gorillas (6)
NSW	–	10	Lugarno FC (6)	2–1	Southern & Ettalong (6)
NSW	–	11	Sans Souci (6)	2–1	Albion Park White Eagles (6)
NSW	–	12	UNSW (5)	1–2	South Coast Flame (5)
NSW	–	13	Brookvale FC (6)	4–1	Coniston FC (6)
NSW	–	14	Chatswood Rangers (6)	3–10	Dulwich Hill (4)
NSW	–	15	Camden Falcons (7)	1–7	Sydney University (4)
NSW	–	16	Menai Hawks (6)	2–0	Abbotsford Juniors (6)
NSW	–	17	Phoenix FC (6)	2–2†	Liverpool Olympic (6)
Liverpool Olympic advance 4–2 on penalties
NSW	–	18	Banksia Tigers (6)	8–1	Parklea SFC (6)
NSW	–	19	Hurstville FC (5)	2–3	Canterbury Bankstown (4)
NSW	–	20	Bankstown City Lions (4)	3–0	Forest Rangers (6)
NSW	–	21	Sydney Coolong (7)	1–7	Camden Tigers (5)
NSW	–	22	Manly Vale (6)	2–1	Roselands FC (6)
NSW	–	23	Randwick City (6)	3–2	Pennant Hills (6)
NSW	–	24	Baulkham Hills (6)	0–2	Arncliffe Aurora (6)
NSW	–	25	Coledale Waves (8)	0–6	Bankstown United (4)
NSW	–	26	Unanderra Hearts (7)	5–2	Padstow Hornets (6)
NSW	–	27	St. Patrick's FC (6)	0–1†	Cringila Lions (6)
NSW	–	28	Georges River Thistles (6)	0–3	FC Eagles Sydney (6)
NSW	–	29	Rydalmere Lions (4)	8–0	Fairfield Bulls (6)
NSW	–	30	Holroyd Rangers (6)	0–10	Bulli FC (6)
NSW	–	31	Gladesville Ryde Magic (4)	7–0	Bankstown Sports Strikers (6)
NSW	–	32	Carlton Rovers (6)	3–0	Moorebank Sports SC (6)
NSW	–	33	Parramatta FC (5)	4–1	Coogee United (6)
NSW	–	34	Terrigal United (6)	3–4	Western Rage (5)
NSW	–	35	Fraser Park (5)	0–2	Wollongong United (6)
NSW	–	36	Kenthurst & District (6)	4–2	Rouse Hill Rams (6)
NSW	–	37	Hornsby Heights (7)	2–3	Berowra FC (6)
NSW	–	38	Scots FC (6)	2–6	Central Coast United (4)
NSW	–	39	Inter Lions (4)	0–1	Wollongong Olympic (6)
NSW	–	40	Prospect United (5)	6–0	Glenmore Park (6)
NSW	–	41	Marayong FC (6)	1–0	Nepean FC (5)
NSW	–	42	Connells Point Rovers (6)	7–0	IFS Community Wolves (9)
NSW	–	43	Peakhurst United (6)	2–4†	Forest Killarney (7)
NSW	–	44	Maroubra United (6)	2–0	West Ryde Rovers (6)
NSW	–	45	Hawkesbury City (5)	2–2†	Kemps Creek United (6)
Kemps Creek United advance 4–2 on penalties
NSW	–	46	Lane Cove (7)	1–0	Glory FC (6)
NSW	–	47	Ryde Saints United (6)	0–2	Enfield Rovers (6)
NSW	–	48	Hills Spirit (8)	0–4	Shoalhaven United (6)
NSW	–	49	Macarthur Rams (4)	1–2	Inner West Hawks (4)
NSW	–	50	Lindfield FC (6)	0–1	UTS FC (7)
Northern New South Wales
NNSW	NTH	51	Coffs City United (4)	3–0	Byron Bay (4)
NNSW	NTH	52	Oxley Vale Attunga (4)	2–4	Port Macquarie United (4)
NNSW	NTH	53	Sawtell FC (4)	0–3	Boambee Bombers (4)
NNSW	NTH	54	Port Saints (4)	3–2	Bellingen FC (5)
NNSW	NTH	55	Westlawn Tigers (4)	0–4	Northern Storm (4)
NNSW	NTH	56	Kempsey Saints (4)	3–1	Macleay Valley Rangers (4)
NNSW	NTH	57	Nambucca Strikers (5)	2–7	Coffs Coast Tigers (4)
NNSW	NTH	58	Camden Haven Redbacks (5)	2–1	Taree Wildcats (4)
NNSW	STH	59	Lake Macquarie Junior (7)	0–4	Newcastle Suns (4)
NNSW	STH	60	Thornton Redbacks (3)	1–2	Singleton Strikers (3)
NNSW	STH	61	Wallsend FC (3)	9–0	Mayfield United Junior (7)
NNSW	STH	62	Toronto Awaba Stags (3)	3–7	Belmont Swansea United (3)
NNSW	STH	63	Cooks Hill United (3)	w/o	Kurri Kurri Junior (7)
NNSW	STH	64	New Lambton (3)	8–0	Garden Suburb (5)
NNSW	STH	65	South Cardiff (3)	1–3	Westlakes Wildcats (5)
NNSW	STH	66	Mayfield United Senior (4)	6–0	Merewether Advance (5)
NNSW	STH	67	Kotara South (4)	6–1	Greta Branxton (6)
NNSW	STH	68	Dudley Redhead United Senior (4)	2–1	Nelson Bay (6)
NNSW	STH	69	Warners Bay (4)	2–3†	West Wallsend (3)
NNSW	STH	70	University of Newcastle (5)	1–3	Bolwarra Lorn (6)
NNSW	STH	71	Kahibah FC (3)	5–2	Cessnock City Hornets (3)
NNSW	STH	72	Beresfield United Seniors (4)	1–2	Minmi Wanderers (6)
Queensland
QLD	FNQ	73	Mareeba United FC (5)	0–4	Edge Hill United (5)
QLD	FNQ	74	Leichhardt FC (5)	1–3	Southside Comets FC (5)
QLD	FNQ	75	Marlin Coast Rangers FC (5)	4–0	Douglas United FC (6)
QLD	FNQ	76	Innisfail United FC (5)	0–3	Stratford Dolphins FC (5)
QLD	NQ	77	Ross River (JCU) FC (6)	1–3	Saints Eagles Souths FC (5)
QLD	NQ	78	MA Olympic FC (5)	4–3†	Estates FC (6)
QLD	NQ	79	Brothers Townsville FC (5)	7–0	Ingham FC (5)
QLD	NQ	80	Rebels FC (5)	6–3	Townsville Warriors FC (5)
QLD	MR	81	City Brothers FC (5)	4–5	Mackay Wanderers (5)
QLD	WB	82	S.C. Corinthians FC (5)	w/o	Tinana FC (6)
QLD	WB	83	United Park Eagles (5)	3–5	Across The Waves (5)
QLD	CQ	84	Bluebirds United FC (5)	1–5	Frenchville FC (5)
QLD	CQ	85	Capricorn Coast FC (5)	0–0†	Clinton FC (6)
Clinton FC advance 4–1 on penalties
QLD	SEQ	86	Nerang Soccer Club (5)	2–2†	Taringa FC (4)
Taringa FC advance 5–4 on penalties
QLD	SEQ	87	Brighton Bulldogs (8)	1–5	Pine Hills (6)
QLD	SEQ	88	The Lakes (5)	6–5	Burleigh Heads (5)
QLD	SEQ	89	Kingscliff District (6)	6–0	Annerley FC (6)
QLD	SEQ	90	Nambour Yandina United (5)	4–0	Brisbane Knights (5)
QLD	SEQ	91	Surfers Paradise Apollo (5)	10–0	The Gap (5)
QLD	SEQ	92	Tarragindi Tigers (8)	4–3	Ormeau FC (8)
QLD	SEQ	93	Ripley Valley (6)	2–0	Samford FC (4)
QLD	SEQ	94	Buderim Wanderers FC (5)	12–1	Ipswich City (6)
QLD	SEQ	95	North Pine (6)	5–1	Western Spirit (5)
QLD	SEQ	96	Caloundra FC (5)	2–1	Rockville Rovers FC (5)
QLD	SEQ	97	AC Carina (6)	3–1	Brisbane Athletic (6)
QLD	SEQ	98	Bayside United (5)	4–1	Virginia FC (4)
QLD	SEQ	99	Centenary Stormers (5)	4–1	Pine Rivers Athletic (8)
QLD	SEQ	100	Kangaroo Point Rovers (7)	0–5	Palm Beach (5)
QLD	SEQ	101	Tallebudgera Valley FC (8)	2–7	Magic United (4)
QLD	SEQ	102	Woombye Snakes (5)	0–2	Acacia Ridge (5)
QLD	SEQ	103	Willowburn FC (5)	0–5	Southport SC (5)
QLD	SEQ	104	North Star (4)	2–3	Albany Creek Excelsior (5)

Fed.	Zone	Tie no	Home team (Tier)	Score	Away team (Tier)
QLD	SEQ	105	Moggill FC (7)	1–0	Caboolture FC (4)
QLD	SEQ	106	New Farm United (6)	2–1	Newmarket SFC (6)
QLD	SEQ	107	Gympie United FC (5)	0–2	Mt Gravatt Hawks (5)
QLD	SEQ	108	Toowong FC (5)	2–1	Grange Thistle (4)
QLD	SEQ	109	Logan Metro (6)	6–0	Coomera FC (4)
QLD	SEQ	110	West Wanderers (5)	0–7	St. George Willawong (5)
South Australia
SA	–	111	Adelaide Red Blue Eagles (5)	2–4	Salisbury United (4)
SA	–	112	Adelaide Hills (3)	3–2†	Adelaide Cobras (3)
SA	–	113	MA Hawks (5)	0–5	Para Hills Knights (3)
SA	–	114	Modbury Jets (3)	2–1	Eastern United (3)
SA	–	115	Adelaide Victory (3)	3–0	Rostrevor Old Collegians (5)
SA	–	116	White City (3)	7–0	Unley Old Scholars (6)
SA	–	117	Pembroke Old Scholars (5)	5–3	Old Ignatians (5)
SA	–	118	West Adelaide (3)	4–3	Seaford Rangers (4)
SA	–	119	Modbury Vista (4)	0–3	University of Adelaide (4)
SA	–	120	BOSA FC (5)	4–3	Adelaide University – Grads Blue (5)
SA	–	121	Cardijn Old Collegians (5)	3–4	Mount Barker United (4)
SA	–	122	The Cove FC (4)	3–2	Noarlunga United (4)
SA	–	123	Northern Demons (4)	1–0†	Adelaide Thunder (5)
SA	–	124	Playford City (3)	6–0	Ingle Farm (5)
SA	–	125	Port Adelaide Pirates (4)	4–1	Vipers FC (4)
SA	–	126	Western Strikers (3)	1–3	Elizabeth Downs (5)
SA	–	127	Gawler Eagles (4)	1–2	West Torrens Birkalla (3)
SA	–	128	Ghan Kilburn City (5)	6–1	Adelaide Titans (5)
SA	–	129	Brahma Lodge (5)	11–0	Sacred Heart Old Collegians (5)
SA	–	130	USC Lion (5)	0–2	Pontian Eagles (4)
Tasmania
TAS	–	131	Nelson Eastern Suburbs (6)	0–4	Northern Rangers (3)
TAS	–	132	Southern FC (5)	1–3	South East United (3)
TAS	–	133	Beachside FC (3)	2–1	Metro FC (3)
TAS	–	134	Barnstoneworth United (7)	0–9	Taroona FC (3)
TAS	–	135	Somerset FC (3)	9–1	Phoenix FC (5)
TAS	–	136	Brighton FC (8)	0–1	Ulverstone FC (3)
Victoria
VIC	–	137	St Kilda SC (5)	w/o	Tinana FC (7)
VIC	–	138	Somerville Eagles (8)	0–8	Preston Lions (4)
VIC	–	139	Brighton (7)	1–2†	Langwarrin (3)
VIC	–	140	Brunswick City (3)	6–0	Essendon United (7)
VIC	–	141	Manningham United (3)	5–2	Brandon Park (6)
VIC	–	142	Monbulk Rangers (6)	2–1	West Preston (8)
VIC	–	143	Mooroolbark (6)	1–0	Western Suburbs (6)
VIC	–	144	Brimbank Stallions (5)	2–4	Beaumaris (5)
VIC	–	145	North Geelong Warriors (3)	3–2	Kingston City (3)
VIC	–	146	South Springvale (5)	3–0	Hoppers Crossing (6)
VIC	–	147	Ringwood City (8)	0–4	Casey Comets (5)
VIC	–	148	Whittlesea United (5)	2–1	North Caulfield (6)
VIC	–	149	Darebin United (8)	1–5	Pascoe Vale (3)
VIC	–	150	Sydenham Park (5)	5–1	Brunswick Juventus Junior (8)
VIC	–	151	Point Cook (7)	0–4	Doveton (4)
VIC	–	152	Malvern City (5)	3–2	Collingwood City (6)
VIC	–	153	Mornington SC (5)	6–1	Monash University (7)
VIC	–	154	Bundoora United (9)	1–3†	Old Scotch (6)
VIC	–	155	Sebastopol Vikings (7)	1–4	Clifton Hill (5)
VIC	–	156	Moreland United (6)	3–4†	Epping City (6)
VIC	–	157	Western Eagles (7)	1–2	Doncaster Rovers (6)
VIC	–	158	Rowville Eagles (7)	0–6	Frankston Pines (7)
VIC	–	159	Glen Waverley (9)	2–4	Banyule City (5)
VIC	–	160	Maidstone United (9)	2–4	Keilor Park (5)
VIC	–	161	Glenroy Lions (9)	2–1	Middle Park (7)
VIC	–	162	Warragul United (5)	4–2	Fitzroy City (5)
VIC	–	163	Bentleigh United Cobras (5)	2–4	North Sunshine Eagles (4)
VIC	–	164	Lalor United (6)	3–2	Geelong Rangers (6)
VIC	–	165	Albion Rovers (6)	0–4	Moreland Zebras (3)
VIC	–	166	Mazenod FC (5)	3–0	Whitehorse United (7)
VIC	–	167	Marcellin Old Collegians (8)	1–2	Berwick City (6)
VIC	–	168	Geelong SC (4)	w/o	Sunbury United (7)
VIC	–	169	Deakin Ducks (9)	1–4	Mill Park (6)
VIC	–	170	Ballarat City (4)	2–1	Corio (5)
VIC	–	171	East Kew (9)	0–3	Richmond (5)
VIC	–	172	Westgate (6)	1–3	Yarraville Glory (5)
VIC	–	173	Boroondara-Carey Eagles (5)	2–1	Springvale White Eagles (4)
VIC	–	174	Werribee City (3)	4–0	Moreland City (3)
VIC	–	175	Bulleen Lions (3)	1–3	Northcote City (3)
VIC	–	176	Westside Strikers Caroline Springs (8)	4–2	Knox City (6)
VIC	–	177	Altona East Phoenix (6)	1–2	Altona North (7)
VIC	–	178	Upfield SC (7)	2–1	Williamstown SC (7)
VIC	–	179	Nunawading City (4)	3–2	Altona City (5)
VIC	–	180	Caroline Springs George Cross (5)	3–4†	Box Hill United (4)
VIC	–	181	Essendon Royals (5)	2–0	South Yarra (7)
VIC	–	182	Goulburn Valley Suns (3)	3–1	Eltham Redbacks (5)
VIC	–	183	Peninsula Strikers (6)	3–0	Heatherton United (6)
VIC	–	184	Whittlesea Ranges (4)	1–2	Hume United (6)
VIC	–	185	Watsonia Heights (8)	3–2	Skye United (6)
VIC	–	186	FC Strathmore (6)	1–2	Greenvale United (8)
Western Australia
WA	–	187	Kingsley Westside (4)	1–1†	Subiaco AFC (3)
Subiaco AFC advance 3–1 on penalties
WA	–	188	Ellenbrook United (6)	0–1	North Perth United (5)
WA	–	189	Hamersley Rovers (5)	0–6	Carramar Shamrock Rovers (4)
WA	–	190	Western Knights (3)	1–1	Stirling Lions (3)
Western Knights advance 6–4 on penalties
WA	–	191	Mandurah City (3)	5–0	Football Margaret River (10)
WA	–	192	North Beach (6)	3–8	Olympic Kingsway (3)
WA	–	193	Canning City (4)	3–4	Dianella White Eagles (4)
WA	–	194	Maddington White City (5)	1–3	Ashfield SC (3)
WA	–	195	Kelmscott Roos (4)	1–6	Forrestfield United (3)
WA	–	196	UWA-Nedlands (3)	4–1	Morley-Windmills (4)
WA	–	197	Quinns FC (3)	w/o	Bunbury United SC (10)
WA	–	198	Fremantle City (3)	9–1	Greyhounds CSC (10)
WA	–	199	Curtin University (4)	0–1	Joondalup United (3)
WA	–	200	Wanneroo City (4)	0–2	Joondalup City (4)
WA	–	201	Busselton City (10)	4–0	East Perth (7)
WA	–	202	Perth AFC (8)	1–1	Riverside CFC (10)
Riverside CFC advance 5–4 on penalties
WA	–	203	Jaguar FC (5)	0–8	Swan United (3)
WA	–	204	Kwinana United (5)	4–0	South Perth United (6)
WA	–	205	South West Phoenix (5)	1–3	Murdoch University Melville (4)
WA	–	206	Balga SC (4)	3–4	Northern City (9)
WA	–	207	Gosnells City (4)	1–1	Joondanna Blues (10)
Gosnells City advance 6–5 on penalties

Notes

- w/o = Walkover
- † = After Extra Time
- ACT Byes – Brindabella Blues (3), Queanbeyan City (3), UC Stars (4).
- QLD Byes – Mackay Lions SC (5), Magpies FC (5).
- SA Bye – Fulham United (3).

== Fourth round ==
Fed.	Zone	Tie no	Home team (Tier)	Score	Away team (Tier)
Australian Capital Territory
ACT	–	1	Monaro Panthers (2)	3–1	O'Connor Knights (3)
ACT	–	2	Canberra Olympic (2)	0–1†	Tuggeranong United (2)
ACT	–	3	Canberra Croatia (2)	3–1	Queanbeyan City (3)
ACT	–	4	Gungahlin United (2)	0–3	Tigers FC (2)
ACT	–	5	Weston Molonglo (3)	3–0	West Canberra Wanderers (2)
ACT	–	6	Belconnen United (2)	7–0	Belnorth FC (6)
ACT	–	7	Yoogali SC (3)	w/o	UC Stars (4)
ACT	–	8	Brindabella Blues (3)	4–5	Wagga City Wanderers (3)
New South Wales
NSW	–	9	Parramatta FC (5)	3–2	Dulwich Hill (4)
NSW	–	10	Arncliffe Aurora (6)	0–1	Manly United FC (2)
NSW	–	11	Glebe Gorillas (6)	2–0	Marayong FC (6)
NSW	–	12	Kemps Creek United (6)	1–1†	Liverpool Olympic (6)
Liverpool Olympic advance 2–1 on penalties
NSW	–	13	St George FC (3)	5–0	Western NSW Mariners (5)
NSW	–	14	Shoalhaven United (6)	0–11	NWS Spirit (3)
NSW	–	15	Sydney United 58 (2)	1–3	Bankstown City Lions (4)
NSW	–	16	Inner West Hawks (4)	2–0	FC Eagles Sydney (6)
NSW	–	17	Lane Cove (7)	2–6	Bonnyrigg White Eagles (3)
NSW	–	18	UTS FC (7)	1–0	Camden Tigers (5)
NSW	–	19	APIA Leichhardt (2)	4–0	Connells Point Rovers (6)
NSW	–	20	Mounties Wanderers (3)	2–1	Gladesville Ryde Magic (4)
NSW	–	21	Manly Vale (6)	2–1	Bulli FC (6)
NSW	–	22	Rockdale Ilinden (2)	2–1	Rydalmere Lions (4)
NSW	–	23	Forest Killarney (7)	3–4†	Unanderra Hearts (7)
NSW	–	24	Sans Souci (6)	0–4	Northern Tigers (3)
NSW	–	25	Maroubra United (6)	1–3	Mt Druitt Town Rangers (2)
NSW	–	26	St George City (3)	2–1	Bankstown United (4)
NSW	–	27	Central Coast United (4)	0–3	Marconi Stallions (2)
NSW	–	28	Prospect United (5)	4–3†	Brookvale FC (6)
NSW	–	29	Banksia Tigers (6)	2–0	Kenthurst & District (6)
NSW	–	30	Lugarno FC (6)	0–3	Enfield Rovers (6)
NSW	–	31	Hills United (3)	1–2	Blacktown Spartans (3)
NSW	–	32	Tarrawanna Blues (6)	1–5	Blacktown City (2)
NSW	–	33	Berowra FC (6)	1–2	Wollongong Olympic (6)
NSW	–	34	Wollongong United (6)	3–2	SD Raiders FC (3)
NSW	–	35	Western Rage (5)	0–13	Sydney Olympic (2)
NSW	–	36	Randwick City (6)	2–1†	Kissing Point (7)
NSW	–	37	Menai Hawks (6)	1–0	Cringila Lions (6)
NSW	–	38	Sutherland Sharks (2)	7–1	South Coast Flame (5)
NSW	–	39	Carlton Rovers (6)	0–5	Canterbury Bankstown (4)
NSW	–	40	Hakoah Sydney City East (3)	7–0	Sydney University (4)
Northern New South Wales
NNSW	NTH	41	Northern Storm (4)	0–2	Coffs City United (4)
NNSW	NTH	42	Port Saints (4)	1–2	Port Macquarie United (4)
NNSW	NTH	43	Coffs Coast Tigers (4)	5–0	Kempsey Saints (4)
NNSW	NTH	44	Boambee Bombers (4)	5–2	Camden Haven Redbacks (5)
NNSW	STH	45	Broadmeadow Magic (2)	4–0	Kotara South (4)
NNSW	STH	46	Lake Macquarie City (2)	7–1	Westlakes Wildcats (5)
NNSW	STH	47	Weston Bears (2)	8–0	Mayfield United Senior (4)
NNSW	STH	48	West Wallsend (3)	1–3†	Dudley Redhead United Senior (4)
NNSW	STH	49	Maitland FC (2)	4–0	Singleton Strikers (3)
NNSW	STH	50	Bolwarra Lorn (6)	0–13	Lambton Jaffas (2)
NNSW	STH	51	Valentine Phoenix (2)	3–0	Minmi Wanderers (6)
NNSW	STH	52	New Lambton (3)	1–2	Edgeworth Eagles (2)
NNSW	STH	53	Wallsend FC (3)	1–8	Belmont Swansea United (3)
NNSW	STH	54	Kahibah FC (3)	2–4	Charlestown Azzurri (2)
NNSW	STH	55	Newcastle Suns (4)	1–5	Adamstown Rosebud (2)
NNSW	STH	56	Newcastle Olympic (2)	6–1	Cooks Hill United (3)
Northern Territory
NT	ASP	57	Gillen Scorpions (2)	2–3	MPH Vikings (2)
NT	ASP	58	Alice Springs Celtic (2)	1–2	Verdi FC (2)
NT	DAR	59	University Azzurri (2)	3–0	Darwin Hearts (3)
NT	DAR	60	Darwin Olympic (2)	9–1	Palmerston Rovers (2)
NT	DAR	61	Litchfield FC (3)	0–5	Casuarina FC (2)
Queensland
QLD	FNQ	62	Marlin Coast Rangers (5)	0–2	Stratford Dolphins (5)
QLD	FNQ	63	Southside Comets FC (5)	2–6	Edge Hill United (5)
QLD	NQ	64	Brothers Townsville (5)	1–0	Rebels FC (5)
QLD	NQ	65	MA Olympic (5)	2–1	Saints Eagles Souths (5)
QLD	MR	66	Magpies Crusaders United (2)	8–1	Mackay Lions (5)
QLD	MR	67	Mackay Wanderers (5)	1–10	Magpies FC (5)
QLD	WB	68	Across The Waves (5)	13–0	S.C. Corinthians (5)
QLD	CQ	69	Clinton FC (6)	0–2	Frenchville FC (5)
QLD	SEQ	70	Rochedale Rovers (3)	1–2†	Souths United (3)
QLD	SEQ	71	Pine Hills (6)	3–2	Caloundra FC (5)
QLD	SEQ	72	Mt Gravatt Hawks (5)	4–1	Acacia Ridge (5)
QLD	SEQ	73	Southside Eagles (3)	4–2	Buderim Wanderers FC (5)
QLD	SEQ	74	Eastern Suburbs (2)	7–2	Bayside United (5)
QLD	SEQ	75	Gold Coast United (2)	2–2†	Albany Creek Excelsior (5)
Gold Coast United advance 6–5 on penalties
QLD	SEQ	76	Ipswich Knights (3)	2–0	Moggill FC (7)
QLD	SEQ	77	St. George Willawong (5)	8–3	AC Carina (6)
QLD	SEQ	78	North Pine (6)	0–2	Logan Lightning (2)
QLD	SEQ	79	Sunshine Coast Fire (3)	4–0	Centenary Stormers (5)
QLD	SEQ	80	Western Pride (3)	1–4	South West Queensland Thunder (3)
QLD	SEQ	81	Wolves FC (3)	4–5†	Southport SC (5)
QLD	SEQ	82	Toowong FC (5)	4–1	Nambour Yandina United (5)

Fed.	Zone	Tie no	Home team (Tier)	Score	Away team (Tier)
QLD	SEQ	83	New Farm United (6)	0–3	Peninsula Power (2)
QLD	SEQ	84	Gold Coast Knights (2)	2–0	Taringa FC (4)
QLD	SEQ	85	Palm Beach (5)	4–2	Magic United (4)
QLD	SEQ	86	Tarragindi Tigers (8)	1–4	Capalaba (2)
QLD	SEQ	87	Logan Metro (6)	0–2	Lions FC (2)
QLD	SEQ	88	Redlands United (2)	2–5	Brisbane City (3)
QLD	SEQ	89	Mitchelton (3)	0–2	Surfers Paradise Apollo (5)
QLD	SEQ	90	Olympic FC (2)	4–0	Moreton Bay United (2)
QLD	SEQ	91	Ripley Valley (6)	1–3	Brisbane Strikers (2)
QLD	SEQ	92	The Lakes (5)	3–4	Holland Park Hawks (3)
QLD	SEQ	93	Kingscliff District (6)	2–7†	Sunshine Coast Wanderers (2)
South Australia
SA	–	94	The Cove FC (4)	1–2†	Fulham United (3)
SA	–	95	Northern Demons (4)	0–4	Croydon Kings (2)
SA	–	96	Pontian Eagles (4)	3–4†	Brahma Lodge (5)
SA	–	97	Adelaide City (2)	3–2	Adelaide Hills (3)
SA	–	98	Adelaide Olympic (2)	1–0	University of Adelaide (4)
SA	–	99	White City (3)	5–0	Pembroke Old Scholars (5)
SA	–	100	Adelaide Comets (2)	9–1	Mount Barker United (4)
SA	–	101	South Adelaide (2)	0–2	Campbelltown City (2)
SA	–	102	BOSA FC (5)	1–5	Modbury Jets (3)
SA	–	103	Elizabeth Downs (5)	3–2†	Para Hills Knights (3)
SA	–	104	Playford City (3)	2–1	Adelaide Blue Eagles (2)
SA	–	105	Adelaide Victory (3)	3–2	Adelaide Raiders (2)
SA	–	106	Port Adelaide Pirates (4)	4–2	West Adelaide (2)
SA	–	107	West Torrens Birkalla (3)	0–2	North Eastern MetroStars (2)
SA	–	108	Sturt Lions (2)	2–0	Cumberland United (2)
SA	–	109	Ghan Kilburn City (5)	w/o	Salisbury United (4)
Tasmania
TAS	–	110	Ulverstone (3)	0–11	Olympia (2)
TAS	–	111	Somerset (3)	3–5	Launceston City (2)
TAS	–	112	New Town Eagles (3)	1–4	Kingborough Lions United (2)
TAS	–	113	South Hobart (2)	2–0	Clarence Zebras (2)
TAS	–	114	Northern Rangers (3)	0–13	Devonport City (2)
TAS	–	115	University of Tasmania (3)	2–1	Beachside (3)
TAS	–	116	Riverside Olympic (2)	0–4	Glenorchy Knights (2)
TAS	–	117	Taroona (3)	4–0	South East United (3)
Victoria
VIC	–	118	Pascoe Vale (3)	3–0	North Sunshine Eagles (4)
VIC	–	119	Yarraville Glory (5)	w/o	Westside Strikers (8)
VIC	–	120	Werribee City (3)	0–6	South Melbourne (2)
VIC	–	121	Lalor United (6)	2–4	Monbulk Rangers (6)
VIC	–	122	Nunawading City (4)	2–1	Heidelberg United (2)
VIC	–	123	Glenroy Lions (9)	0–2	Malvern City (5)
VIC	–	124	Manningham United (3)	6–0	Doncaster Rovers (6)
VIC	–	125	Box Hill United (4)	2–3	Mornington (5)
VIC	–	126	Hume City (2)	w/o	Warragul United (5)
VIC	–	127	Green Gully (2)	2–0	Dandenong Thunder (2)
VIC	–	128	Upfield (7)	1–3	Moreland Zebras (3)
VIC	–	129	Hume United (6)	1–2	Sydenham Park (5)
VIC	–	130	Richmond (5)	0–2	Dandenong City (2)
VIC	–	131	Fawkner (7)	1–4	Mooroolbark (6)
VIC	–	132	Berwick City (6)	1–9	Port Melbourne (2)
VIC	–	133	Bentleigh Greens (2)	2–1	Essendon Royals (5)
VIC	–	134	Geelong (4)	1–3	Brunswick City (3)
VIC	–	135	Whittlesea United (5)	2–4	Langwarrin (3)
VIC	–	136	Northcote City (3)	1–0	Doveton (4)
VIC	–	137	Boroondara-Carey Eagles (5)	1–2	Mill Park (6)
VIC	–	138	Casey Comets (5)	1–4†	Goulburn Valley Suns (3)
VIC	–	139	Old Scotch (6)	0–3	Melbourne Knights (2)
VIC	–	140	Avondale FC (2)	6–0	Beaumaris (4)
VIC	–	141	Peninsula Strikers (5)	0–6	North Geelong Warriors (3)
VIC	–	142	Altona North (7)	2–1	St Albans Saints (2)
VIC	–	143	Mazenod (5)	0–3	Oakleigh Cannons (2)
VIC	–	144	South Springvale (5)	1–7	Eastern Lions (2)
VIC	–	145	Banyule City (5)	0–3	Clifton Hill (5)
VIC	–	146	Ballarat City (4)	1–0	Altona Magic (2)
VIC	–	147	Greenvale United (8)	1–3	Preston Lions (4)
VIC	–	148	Keilor Park (5)	4–0	Watsonia Heights (8)
VIC	–	149	Frankston Pines (7)	4–1	Epping City (6)
Western Australia
WA	–	150	Forrestfield United (3)	3–4†	Carramar Shamrock Rovers (4)
WA	–	151	Inglewood United (2)	2–2†	Armadale SC (2)
Armadale SC advance 3–0 on penalties
WA	–	152	Joondalup United (3)	2–6	Balcatta FC (2)
WA	–	153	Mandurah City (3)	1–1†	Quinns FC (3)
Mandurah City advance 4–3 on penalties
WA	–	154	Murdoch University Melville (4)	0–2	Perth SC (2)
WA	–	155	Olympic Kingsway (3)	9–1	Riverside CFC (10)
WA	–	156	Rockingham City (2)	1–0	Joondalup City (4)
WA	–	157	Sorrento FC (2)	1–0	Subiaco AFC (3)
WA	–	158	Swan United (3)	0–3	Gwelup Croatia (2)
WA	–	159	UWA-Nedlands (3)	2–5	Gosnells City (4)
WA	–	160	Ashfield SC (3)	1–6	Floreat Athena (2)
WA	–	161	Northern City (9)	1–3	North Perth United (5)
WA	–	162	Bayswater City (2)	1–0	Dianella White Eagles (4)
WA	–	163	Busselton City (10)	0–3	Kwinana United (5)
WA	–	164	Cockburn City (2)	1–0	Western Knights (3)
WA	–	165	ECU Joondalup (2)	3–0	Fremantle City (3)

Notes

- w/o = Walkover
- † = After Extra Time
- NT Bye – Port Darwin (2).

== Fifth round ==
Fed.	Zone	Tie no	Home team (Tier)	Score	Away team (Tier)
Australian Capital Territory
ACT	–	1	Canberra Croatia (2)	4–2†	Belconnen United (2)
ACT	–	2	Monaro Panthers (2)	12–0	Wagga City Wanderers (3)
ACT	–	3	Yoogali SC (3)	2–0	Tuggeranong United (2)
ACT	–	4	Weston Molonglo (3)	0–6	Tigers FC (2)
New South Wales
NSW	–	5	Northern Tigers (3)	3–2†	St George City (3)
NSW	–	6	Enfield Rovers (6)	0–7	Manly United (2)
NSW	–	7	Blacktown Spartans (3)	1–1†	Glebe Gorillas (6)
Blacktown Spartans advance 4–1 on penalties
NSW	–	8	Mt Druitt Town Rangers (2)	3–2	Bankstown City Lions (4)
NSW	–	9	Blacktown City (2)	10–0	UTS FC (7)
NSW	–	10	NWS Spirit FC (3)	6–0	Manly Vale (6)
NSW	–	11	Marconi Stallions (2)	1–0†	Sutherland Sharks (2)
NSW	–	12	Liverpool Olympic (6)	1–0	Unanderra Hearts (7)
NSW	–	13	Canterbury Bankstown (4)	3–0	Wollongong United (6)
NSW	–	14	Hakoah Sydney City East (3)	2–0	Parramatta FC (5)
NSW	–	15	Wollongong Olympic (6)	2–1	Inner West Hawks (4)
NSW	–	16	Menai Hawks (6)	1–3†	Sydney Olympic (2)
NSW	–	17	Rockdale Ilinden (2)	7–1	Prospect United (5)
NSW	–	18	St George FC (3)	4–1	Randwick City (6)
NSW	–	19	APIA Leichhardt (2)	2–1	Bonnyrigg White Eagles (3)
NSW	–	20	Mounties Wanderers (3)	1–1†	Banksia Tigers (6)
Banksia Tigers advance 4–1 on penalties
Northern New South Wales
NNSW	NTH	21	Port Macquarie United (4)	w/o	Boambee Bombers (4)
NNSW	NTH	22	Coffs City United (4)	3–3†	Coffs Coast Tigers (4)
Coffs City United advance 4–3 on penalties
NNSW	STH	23	Adamstown Rosebud (2)	1–4	Belmont Swansea United (3)
NNSW	STH	24	Charlestown Azzurri (2)	2–3†	Lambton Jaffas (2)
NNSW	STH	25	Maitland FC (2)	2–3†	Newcastle Olympic (2)
NNSW	STH	26	Broadmeadow Magic (2)	4–3†	Edgeworth Eagles (2)
NNSW	STH	27	Valentine Phoenix (2)	1–2	Lake Macquarie City (2)
NNSW	STH	28	Dudley Redhead United Senior (4)	0–3	Weston Bears (2)
Northern Territory
NT	ASP	29	MPH Vikings (2)	1–3	Verdi FC (2)
NT	DAR	30	Hellenic AC (2)	5–1	Mindil Aces (2)
NT	DAR	31	Casuarina FC (2)	4–3	Port Darwin (2)
NT	DAR	32	University Azzurri (2)	5–3†	Darwin Olympic (2)
Queensland
QLD	FNQ	33	Stratford Dolphins (5)	0–7	Edge Hill United (5)
QLD	NQ	34	Brothers Townsville (5)	4–0	MA Olympic (5)
QLD	MR	35	Magpies Crusaders United (2)	3–2	Magpies FC (5)
QLD	CQ	36	Across The Waves (5)	3–4	Frenchville FC (5)
QLD	SEQ	37	Gold Coast United (2)	1–3	Olympic FC (2)
QLD	SEQ	38	Mt Gravatt Hawks (5)	0–3	Holland Park Hawks (3)
QLD	SEQ	39	Southside Eagles (3)	4–1	Palm Beach (5)
QLD	SEQ	40	Lions FC (2)	5–0	Southport SC (5)
QLD	SEQ	41	Sunshine Coast Fire (3)	1–4	Logan Lightning (2)

Fed.	Zone	Tie no	Home team (Tier)	Score	Away team (Tier)
QLD	SEQ	42	Brisbane Strikers (2)	1–3	Sunshine Coast Wanderers (2)
QLD	SEQ	43	Peninsula Power (2)	1–0	St. George Willawong (5)
QLD	SEQ	44	Ipswich Knights (3)	4–1†	Souths United (3)
QLD	SEQ	45	South West Queensland Thunder (3)	4–1	Toowong FC (5)
QLD	SEQ	46	Surfers Paradise Apollo (5)	4–1	Capalaba (2)
QLD	SEQ	47	Gold Coast Knights (2)	5–0	Eastern Suburbs (2)
QLD	SEQ	48	Brisbane City (3)	2–0	Pine Hills (6)
South Australia
SA	–	49	Elizabeth Downs (5)	0–3	Playford City (3)
SA	–	50	Adelaide Comets (2)	4–0	Adelaide Victory (3)
SA	–	51	Fulham United (3)	1–3	Adelaide Olympic (2)
SA	–	52	Salisbury United (4)	1–1†	Croydon Kings (2)
Croydon Kings advance 5–4 on penalties
SA	–	53	White City (3)	2–3	Adelaide City (2)
SA	–	54	Modbury Jets (3)	0–1	Sturt Lions (2)
SA	–	55	Campbelltown City (2)	3–0	Port Adelaide Pirates (4)
SA	–	56	Brahma Lodge (5)	3–5†	North Eastern MetroStars (2)
Tasmania
TAS	–	57	Kingborough Lions United (2)	1–2	Glenorchy Knights (2)
TAS	–	58	South Hobart (2)	1–2	Devonport City (2)
TAS	–	59	Launceston City (2)	2–1†	Olympia (2)
TAS	–	60	Taroona (3)	5–2†	University of Tasmania (3)
Victoria
VIC	–	61	Eastern Lions (2)	4–1†	Mornington (5)
VIC	–	62	North Geelong Warriors (3)	6–1	Keilor Park (5)
VIC	–	63	Malvern City (5)	1–2	Langwarrin (3)
VIC	–	64	Bentleigh Greens (2)	4–0	Altona North (7)
VIC	–	65	South Melbourne (2)	1–1†	Melbourne Knights (2)
South Melbourne advance 4–1 on penalties
VIC	–	66	Oakleigh Cannons (2)	1–0	Preston Lions (4)
VIC	–	67	Manningham United (3)	0–1	Port Melbourne (2)
VIC	–	68	Pascoe Vale (3)	2–1	Brunswick City (3)
VIC	–	69	Monbulk Rangers (6)	2–1	Mooroolbark (6)
VIC	–	70	Ballarat City (4)	2–3	Clifton Hill (5)
VIC	–	71	Moreland Zebras (3)	1–0†	Northcote City (3)
VIC	–	72	Nunawading City (4)	2–3	Dandenong City (2)
VIC	–	73	Hume City (2)	3–0	Frankston Pines (7)
VIC	–	74	Green Gully (2)	10–0	Mill Park (6)
VIC	–	75	Goulburn Valley Suns (3)	0–3	Sydenham Park (5)
VIC	–	76	Avondale FC (2)	2–0	Yarraville Glory (5)
Western Australia
WA	–	77	Bayswater City (2)	4–0	Balcatta FC (2)
WA	–	78	Rockingham City (2)	1–2	Gosnells City (4)
WA	–	79	Perth SC (2)	2–0	Kwinana United (5)
WA	–	80	Sorrento FC (2)	1–0	Carramar Shamrock Rovers (4)
WA	–	81	Mandurah City (3)	0–1†	Cockburn City (2)
WA	–	82	Gwelup Croatia (2)	0–3	Floreat Athena (2)
WA	–	83	Olympic Kingsway (3)	0–8	ECU Joondalup (2)
WA	–	84	North Perth United (5)	2–4†	Armadale SC (2)

Notes

- † = After Extra Time

== Sixth round ==
Fed.	Zone	Tie no	Home team (Tier)	Score	Away team (Tier)
Australian Capital Territory
ACT	–	1	Monaro Panthers (2)	1–1†	Canberra Croatia (2)
Monaro Panthers advance 5–3 on penalties
ACT	–	2	Tigers FC (2)	1–0	Yoogali SC (3)
New South Wales
NSW	–	3	Mt Druitt Town Rangers (2)	2–1	Wollongong Olympic (6)
NSW	–	4	Manly United (2)	6–0	Banksia Tigers (6)
NSW	–	5	Blacktown City (2)	4–2	Blacktown Spartans (3)
NSW	–	6	Liverpool Olympic (6)	0–9	Sydney Olympic (2)
NSW	–	7	Rockdale Ilinden (2)	2–0	St George FC (3)
NSW	–	8	NWS Spirit FC (3)	0–2	Marconi Stallions (2)
NSW	–	9	Hakoah Sydney City East (3)	4–1†	Canterbury Bankstown (4)
NSW	–	10	Northern Tigers (3)	1–2†	APIA Leichhardt (2)
Northern New South Wales
NNSW	–	11	Lambton Jaffas (2)	0–1	Newcastle Olympic (2)
NNSW	–	12	Belmont Swansea United (3)	0–1	Weston Bears (2)
NNSW	–	13	Broadmeadow Magic (2)	8–0	Port Macquarie United (4)
NNSW	–	14	Coffs City United (4)	3–3†	Lake Macquarie City (2)
Coffs City United advance 5–4 on penalties.
Northern Territory
NT	–	15	Hellenic AC (2)	2–1	Verdi FC (2)
NT	DAR	16	Casuarina FC (2)	2–0	University Azzurri (2)
Queensland
QLD	CQ	17	Frenchville FC (5)	0–1†	Magpies Crusaders United (2)
QLD	CQ	18	Edge Hill United (5)	4–2	Brothers Townsville (5)
QLD	SEQ	19	Sunshine Coast Wanderers (2)	3–1†	Surfers Paradise Apollo (5)
QLD	SEQ	20	Logan Lightning (2)	0–5	Lions FC (2)

Fed.	Zone	Tie no	Home team (Tier)	Score	Away team (Tier)
QLD	SEQ	21	Gold Coast Knights (2)	5–0	Holland Park Hawks (3)
QLD	SEQ	22	Brisbane City (3)	3–2†	South West Queensland Thunder (3)
QLD	SEQ	23	Southside Eagles (3)	0–2	Olympic FC (2)
QLD	SEQ	24	Peninsula Power (2)	3–0	Ipswich Knights (3)
South Australia
SA	–	25	Sturt Lions (2)	2–4	Adelaide City (2)
SA	–	26	Campbelltown City (2)	4–1	Adelaide Comets (2)
SA	–	27	North Eastern MetroStars (2)	5–2	Playford City (3)
SA	–	28	Adelaide Olympic (2)	2–0	Croydon Kings (2)
Tasmania
TAS	–	29	Taroona (3)	0–8	Devonport City (2)
TAS	–	30	Launceston City (2)	0–1†	Glenorchy Knights (2)
Victoria
VIC	–	31	Dandenong City (2)	1–2	Pascoe Vale (3)
VIC	–	32	Hume City (2)	3–0	Bentleigh Greens (2)
VIC	–	33	Oakleigh Cannons (2)	3–2	Green Gully (2)
VIC	–	34	South Melbourne (2)	2–1	Eastern Lions (2)
VIC	–	35	Port Melbourne (2)	4–0	Sydenham Park (5)
VIC	–	36	Moreland Zebras (3)	3–1	Langwarrin (3)
VIC	–	37	Monbulk Rangers (6)	2–1	Clifton Hill (5)
VIC	–	38	North Geelong Warriors (3)	1–5	Avondale FC (2)
Western Australia
WA	–	39	Cockburn City (2)	2–1	Perth SC (2)
WA	–	40	Sorrento FC (2)	3–2	Armadale SC (2)
WA	–	41	Bayswater City (2)	0–2	ECU Joondalup (2)
WA	–	42	Floreat Athena (2)	3–0	Gosnells City (4)

Notes

- † = After Extra Time

== Seventh round ==
Fed.	Zone	Tie no	Home team (Tier)	Score	Away team (Tier)
Australian Capital Territory
ACT	–	1	Tigers FC (2)	5–2	Monaro Panthers (2)
New South Wales
NSW	–	2	Manly United (2)	0–2	Sydney Olympic (2)
NSW	–	3	APIA Leichhardt (2)	3–1†	Hakoah Sydney City East (3)
NSW	–	4	Mt Druitt Town Rangers (2)	2–1	Rockdale Ilinden (2)
NSW	–	5	Blacktown City (2)	1–0	Marconi Stallions (2)
Northern New South Wales
NNSW	–	6	Broadmeadow Magic (2)	2–1	Weston Bears (2)
NNSW	–	7	Newcastle Olympic (2)	1–0	Coffs City United (4)
Northern Territory
NT	–	8	Hellenic AC (2)	1–2	Casuarina FC (2)
Queensland
QLD	CQ	9	Magpies Crusaders United (2)	1–3	Edge Hill United (5)
QLD	SEQ	10	Gold Coast Knights (2)	4–0	Sunshine Coast Wanderers (2)
QLD	SEQ	11	Brisbane City (3)	1–2	Lions FC (2)
QLD	SEQ	12	Peninsula Power (2)	2–1	Olympic FC (2)

Fed.	Zone	Tie no	Home team (Tier)	Score	Away team (Tier)
South Australia
SA	–	13	Adelaide Olympic (2)	1–0	Campbelltown City (2)
SA	–	14	Adelaide City (2)	2–0	North Eastern MetroStars (2)
Tasmania
TAS	–	15	Devonport City (2)	2–2†	Glenorchy Knights (2)
Devonport City advance 4–3 on penalties
Victoria
VIC	–	16	Port Melbourne (2)	2–1†	Moreland Zebras (3)
VIC	–	17	Avondale FC (2)	4–1	Pascoe Vale (3)
VIC	–	18	Oakleigh Cannons (2)	0–0†	South Melbourne (2)
South Melbourne advance 6–5 on penalties
VIC	–	19	Monbulk Rangers (6)	0–3	Hume City (2)
Western Australia
WA	–	20	Sorrento FC (2)	0–1	ECU Joondalup (2)
WA	–	21	Floreat Athena (2)	3–0	Cockburn City (2)

Notes

- † = After Extra Time

== A-League Men play-offs ==
13 November 2021
19:00 AEDT

Western United	2–1	Newcastle Jets
Wales 44'; Prijović 79'	Report	Penha 63'

GMHBA Stadium, Geelong
Attendance: 1,127
Referee: Jonathan Barreiro

24 November 2021
19:30 ACDT

Perth Glory	1–1 (a.e.t.)	Melbourne Victory
Anasmo 26'	Report	Brooks 1'
Penalties
Bramwell (penalty scored); Donnell (penalty scored); Coyne (penalty missed); Rawlins (penalty scored); Colli (penalty missed)	3–4	(penalty scored) Lawrie-Lattanzio; (penalty scored) Velupillay; (penalty missed) Tyson; (penalty scored) Lethlean; (penalty scored) Leban

Marden Sports Complex, Adelaide
Attendance: 430
Referee: Daniel Elder
