= List of Perth Glory FC players (25–99 appearances) =

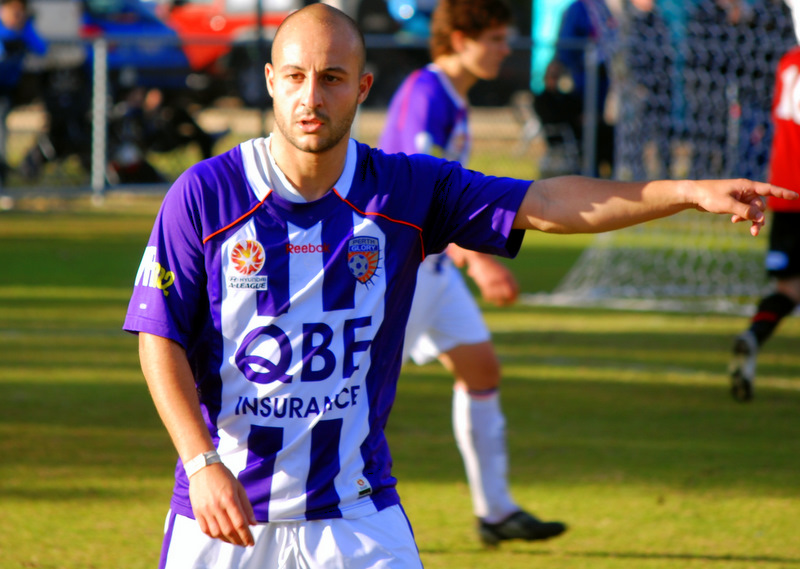
Adriano Pellegrino made 79 appearances in three years at Perth Glory.

Perth Glory Football Club is a soccer club based in Perth, Western Australia and was founded in 1995. The club played eight seasons, from 1996 to 2004, in the National Soccer League. In 2005 they became the first and only Western Australian member admitted into the A-League. The club's first team has competed in nationally and internationally organised competitions, and all players who have played between 25 and 99 such matches, either as a member of the starting eleven or as a substitute, are listed below.

Each player's details include the duration of his Perth Glory career, his typical playing position while with the club, and the number of games played and goals scored in all senior competitive matches.

== Key ==
- The list is ordered first by date of debut, and then if necessary in alphabetical order.
- Appearances as a substitute are included.
- Statistics are correct up to and including the match played on 26 July 2024. Where a player left the club permanently after this date, his statistics are updated to his date of leaving.

Positions key
GK	Goalkeeper
DF	Defender
MF	Midfielder
FW	Forward

Nationality
Unless otherwise noted, the nationality of a player is determined by the country/countries which he has played for, or if said person has not played international football, their country of birth.
Position
Playing positions are listed according to the tactical formations that were employed at the time.
Club career
Club career is defined as the first and last calendar years in which the player appeared for the club in any of the competitions listed below.
Total appearances and Total goals
Total appearances and goals comprise those in the National Soccer League, A-League Men, Australia Cup, A-League Pre-Season Challenge Cup, AFC Champions League and the 2005 Australian Club World Championship Qualifying Tournament.

== Players ==
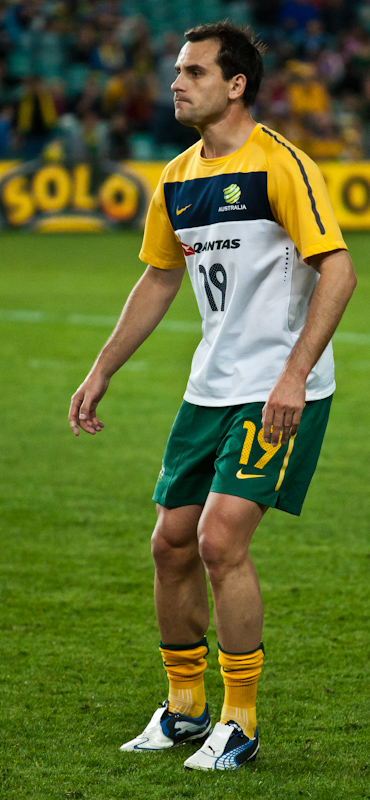
Richard Garcia made 69 appearances with the Glory, and managed the club from 2020 to 2022.

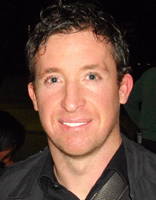
Englishman Robbie Fowler made 28 appearances and scored 9 goals in his one season at Perth.

Players highlighted in bold are still actively playing at Perth Glory

List of Perth Glory FC players with between 25 and 99 appearances
Player	Nationality	Pos	Club career	Starts	Subs	Total	Goals	Ref.
Player	Nationality	Pos	Club career	Appearances			Goals	Ref.
Vinko Buljubasic	Australia	DF	1996–2001	55	7	62	1	
Paul McVittie	England	MF	1996–1998	30	12	42	2	
Craig Naven	Australia	DF	1996–1998	28	1	29	2	
Paul Strudwick	England	FW	1996–1999	58	10	68	10	
Gavin Wilkinson	New Zealand	DF	1996–1999	63	5	68	4	
Dale Wingell	Australia	DF	1996–1997	22	3	25	2	
Vasilios Kalogeracos	Australia	FW	1996–1999	38	21	59	20	
Anthony Carbone	Australia	MF	1997–1999	31	2	33	2	
Danny Hay	Australia	MF	1997–1999; 2006	49	3	52	2	
Tony Franken	Australia	GK	1997–1999	38	1	39	0	
James Afkos	Australia	MF	1997–2000	10	27	37	0	
Michael Garcia	Australia	MF	1998–2002	34	23	57	4	
Troy Halpin	Australia	MF	1998–2000	49	10	59	6	
Robert Trajkovski	Australia	DF	1998–2001	73	0	73	4	
Con Boutsianis	Australia	FW	1998–2000	41	8	49	25	
John Carbone	Australia	MF	1998–2001	10	39	49	3	
Craig Deans	Australia	MF	1999; 2000–2002	47	8	55	3	
Alistair Edwards	Australia	FW	1999–2002	57	36	93	24	
Ivan Ergic	Serbia	MF	1999–2000	23	9	32	10	
Dion Valle	Chile	DF	1999–2002	26	11	37	0	
Kasey Wehrman	Australia	MF	1999–2001	36	1	37	0	
Gary Faria	Australia	DF	2000–2004	54	25	79	6	
Ljubo Milicevic	Australia	DF	2000–2001	25	4	29	3	
Brad Maloney	Australia	MF	2000–2002	35	6	41	13	
Shane Pryce	Australia	DF	2000–2003	79	0	79	2	
Nik Mrdja	Australia	FW	2001–2004	29	44	73	25	
Matthew Horsley	Australia	MF	2001–2005	69	9	78	5	
David Tarka	Australia	DF	2001–2003	36	9	45	1	
Bradley Hassell	Australia	FW	2002–2004	67	3	70	15	
Andre Gumprecht	Germany	MF	2002–2003	34	0	34	4	
Adrian Cáceres	Argentina	MF	2002–2006	18	48	66	9	
Mark Byrnes	Australia	DF	2003–2004	28	16	44	2	
Simon Colosimo	Australia	DF	2002–2008	70	6	76	2	
Matthew Bingley	Australia	MF	2003–2004	20	6	26	0	
Shaun Murphy	Australia	DF	2003–2004	28	0	28	4	
Tom Pondeljak	Australia	MF	2003–2004	26	0	26	7	
Billy Celeski	Australia	MF	2005–2008	37	4	41	4	
Ante Kovacevic	Australia	MF	2005–2007	41	3	44	0	
Stuart Young	England	FW	2005–2006	24	5	29	7	
David Tarka	Australia	DF	2005–2009	41	5	46	2	
David Micevski	Australia	MF	2006–2007	21	11	32	0	
Leo Bertos	New Zealand	FW	2006–2008	40	3	43	4	
Nikita Rukavytsya	Australia	FW	2007–2009	32	15	47	18	
Nick Rizzo	Australia	FW	2007–2009	16	16	32	1	
Tando Velaphi	Australia	GK	2007–2011; 2020–2021	88	0	88	0	
Nikolai Topor-Stanley	Australia	DF	2007–2009	39	2	41	0	
James Downey	Australia	DF	2007–2010	28	9	37	0	
Adriano Pellegrino	Australia	MF	2008–2011	72	7	79	5	
Scott Bulloch	Australia	MF	2008–2010	15	15	30	3	
Wayne Srhoj	Australia	MF	2008–2010	33	4	37	5	
Chris Coyne	Australia	DF	2009–2011	31	1	32	0	
Todd Howarth	Australia	DF	2009–2012	59	23	82	5	
Branko Jelic	Serbia	FW	2009–2011	20	13	33	7	
Andy Todd	Serbia	DF	2009–2011	38	3	41	0	
Tommy Amphlett	England	FW	2009–2012	7	20	27	0	
Robbie Fowler	England	FW	2010–2011	25	3	28	9	
Josh Mitchell	Australia	DF	2010–2012	27	8	35	2	
**Adam Taggart**	Australia	FW	2011–2012; 2016–2018; 2023–	67	22	89	46	
Andrezinho	Brazil	FW	2011–2012	13	12	25	2	
Bas van den Brink	Netherlands	DF	2011–2013	41	1	42	1	
Travis Dodd	Australia	FW	2011–2013	45	3	48	9	
Billy Mehmet	Republic of Ireland	FW	2011–2012	31	11	42	10	
Liam Miller	Republic of Ireland	MF	2011–2013	49	0	49	2	
Shane Smeltz	Australia	FW	2011–2014	52	6	58	28	
Steve Pantelidis	Australia	DF	2011–2013	44	5	49	0	
Dean Heffernan	Australia	DF	2012–2013	32	2	34	1	
**Brandon O'Neill**	Australia	MF	2012–2015; 2021–2022; 2024–	13	17	30	1	
Scott Jamieson	Australia	DF	2012–2015	57	3	60	1	
Michael Thwaite	Australia	DF	2012–2016	93	0	93	2	
Ryo Nagai	Australia	FW	2012–2013	19	7	26	4	
Jack Clisby	Australia	DF	2013–2015; 2021–2023	61	11	72	3	
Daniel De Silva	Australia	MF	2013–2015	17	19	36	4	
Jamie Maclaren	Australia	FW	2013–2015	21	19	40	12	
Sidnei Sciola	Brazil	FW	2013–2015	36	13	49	7	
Nebojša Marinković	Serbia	MF	2014–2017	74	18	92	22	
Rostyn Griffiths	Australia	MF	2014–2017	62	3	65	8	
Diogo Ferreira	Australia	MF	2014–2016	19	8	27	0	
Richard Garcia	Australia	FW	2014–2017	51	18	69	5	
Mitch Nichols	Australia	MF	2014–2015; 2017–2018	23	7	30	1	
Mitchell Oxborrow	Australia	MF	2015–2017; 2021–2023	27	21	48	1	
György Sándor	Hungary	MF	2015–2016	28	0	28	5	
Marc Warren	Australia	DF	2015–2018	39	5	44	0	
Ante Covic	Australia	GK	2015–2016	31	0	31	0	
Alex Grant	Australia	DF	2015–2020	85	6	91	3	
Shane Lowry	Australia	DF	2016–2019	69	4	73	4	
Brandon Wilson	Australia	FW	2016–2019; 2020–2021	42	29	71	1	
Joseph Mills	England	DF	2016–2018	43	3	46	0	
Jake Brimmer	Australia	MF	2017–2020	25	39	64	0	
Callum Timmins	Australia	MF	2017–2022	32	13	45	4	
Neil Kilkenny	Australia	MF	2018–2021	89	2	91	12	
Ivan Franjic	Australia	DF	2018–2020	50	6	56	4	
Jason Davidson	Australia	DF	2018–2019	27	1	28	2	
Chris Ikonomidis	Australia	MF	2018–2021	36	5	41	16	
Juande	Spain	MF	2018–2020	42	1	43	2	
Tomislav Mrcela	Australia	DF	2018–2020	32	0	32	3	
Nicholas D'Agostino	Australia	FW	2019–2021	14	17	31	8	
Bruno Fornaroli	Australia	FW	2019–2022	76	3	79	35	
**Trent Ostler**	Australia	MF	2019–	12	26	38	2	
Osama Malik	Australia	DF	2019–2022	24	13	37	0	
Dane Ingham	New Zealand	DF	2020–2021	24	1	35	3	
Carlo Armiento	Australia	FW	2020–2022	11	20	31	4	
Jonathan Aspropotamitis	Australia	DF	2020–2022	34	1	35	1	
**Luke Bodnar**	Australia	DF	2020–	32	18	50	1	
**Giordano Colli**	Australia	MF	2020–	49	15	64	3	
Joshua Rawlins	Australia	DF	2020–2022; 2024	35	17	52	1	
Kosuke Ota	Japan	DF	2021–2022	28	2	30	0	
Ciaran Bramwell	Australia	FW	2021–2022	11	17	28	3	
**Cameron Cook**	Australia	GK	2021–	34	1	35	0	
**Jacob Muir**	Australia	DF	2021–	28	8	36	0	
Adam Zimarino	Australia	FW	2021–2024	5	22	27	2	
Antonee Burke-Gilroy	Australia	DF	2021–2023	27	7	34	1	
**Mustafa Amini**	Australia	MF	2022–	30	6	36	2	
Mark Beevers	England	DF	2022–2024	34	0	34	1	
Stefan Colakovski	North Macedonia	FW	2022–2024	16	9	25	6	
Luke Ivanovic	Australia	FW	2022–2024	13	12	25	1	
Salim Khelifi	Tunisia	MF	2022–2024	24	1	25	3	
John Koutroumbis	Australia	DF	2022–2024	33	8	41	0	
**David Williams**	Australia	FW	2022–	14	31	45	11	
Daniel Bennie	Australia	FW	2023–2024	22	4	26	1	

== See also ==
- List of Perth Glory FC (A-League Women) players
