= Darko Stanojević =

Darko Stanojević may refer to:

- Darko Stanojević (footballer, born 1987), Serbian footballer
- Darko Stanojević (footballer, born 1997), Serbian footballer
