= Tyler Vecchio =

Australian soccer player (born 2003)

Personal information
- Full name: Tyler Vecchio
- Date of birth: 15 January 2003 (age 23)
- Place of birth: Australia
- Position: Midfielder

Team information
- Current team: Green Gully
- Number: 7

Youth career
- Sorrento FC
- Perth Glory

Senior career*
Years	Team	Apps	(Gls)
2020–2023	Perth Glory NPL	23	(1)
2021–2023	Perth Glory	8	(0)
2023–	Green Gully	16	(3)
- * Club domestic league appearances and goals as of 1 September 2023

Tyler Vecchio (born 15 January 2003) is an Australian professional soccer player who plays as a midfielder for Perth Glory. He made his professional debut in a FFA Cup playoff match against Melbourne Victory on 24 November 2021.
