= Across the Waves FC =

- Full name: Across the Waves FC
- Nickname: The Waves
- Founded: 1958; 68 years ago
- Ground: The Waves Sports Complex, Bundaberg
- League: FQPL3 Wide Bay
- 2026: 1st of 8
Home colours	Away colours

Across the Waves is an Australian football club based in Bundaberg, Queensland. Established in 1958 by Italian immigrants, the club originally competed in competitions within the Bundaberg Region. In the 1980s, the club competed in the Queensland State League. Across the Waves later competed in the top-flight Brisbane Premier League under the name "Bundaberg Waves" in the 1990s, achieving a second place finish in the 1997 season. They currently compete in the FQPL3 Wide Bay competition. Home matches are played at the Waves Sports Complex. The club's most recent honours include the 2023 FQPL Champions League and consecutive domestic league titles in 2021, 2022 and 2023.

== History ==
Across the Waves FC was established in 1958. The original club was solely utilised for social gatherings around bocce and soccer by early immigrant Italian farmers of Bundaberg and was so named 'Across the Waves', for that was how they travelled to Australia aboard the Angelina Lauro - across the waves of the Indian Ocean. Today, the club operates as a sub-club of Across the Waves Group Limited, a non-for-profit sporting organisation with over 85,000 members and clubs in Bundaberg, Caloundra and Elliot Heads.

== Honours ==
=== Football Queensland ===
- FQPL3 Wide Bay (third tier)
  - Premiership
    - Winners (4): 2023, 2024, 2025, 2026
  - Championship
    - Winners (3): 2024, 2025, 2026
