= Green Gully SC =

Green Gully
- Full name: Green Gully Soccer Club
- Nicknames: Cavaliers, Gully
- Founded: 1955; 71 years ago
- Ground: Green Gully Reserve, Keilor Downs
- Capacity: 10,000
- Chairman: Anthony Klotz
- Manager: Patricio Vargas
- League: NPL Victoria
- 2026: 13th of 14 (relegated)
- Website: www.greengullysc.com.au
Home colours	Away colours

Green Gully Soccer Club is an Australian association football club based in Melbourne. Green Gully is one of the largest clubs in Melbourne, having participated in the now defunct National Soccer League between 1984 and 1986. The club currently competes in the National Premier Leagues Victoria, with matches played at Green Gully Reserve in Keilor Downs, Victoria. Green Gully have won the Victorian state league title nine times, second only to South Melbourne FC with ten.

It is one of seven state league teams to eliminate an A-League team in the FFA Cup, alongside Blacktown City FC, Heidelberg United FC, Redlands United FC, Adelaide City FC, Bentleigh Greens SC and APIA Leichhardt FC.

== History ==
=== Early history ===
The club was established as Ajax Soccer Club in 1955 by Maltese immigrants. In honour of the Maltese Floriana club, Ajax SC adopted their familiar green and white playing strips. The club was renamed to Green Gully Ajax SC when it moved to its current home ground at Green Gully Reserve in 1966, in the West of Melbourne suburb of Kealba. In 1972, the City of Keilor Council laid down two full size football pitches and constructed a large dressing room facility which included showers and toilets. The "Ajax" was dropped in 1982.

The club competed in the National Soccer League of Australia (NSL) from 1984 to 1986 and attracted some great players such as George Campbell from Preston (originally from Aberdeen), and Scott Fraser from Rangers.

Green Gully is a 'Sister Club' with Caroline Springs George Cross.

Green Gully have been Victorian Champions in 1981, 1982, 1983, 1999, 2000, 2003, 2005, 2010 and 2011.

=== Recent history ===
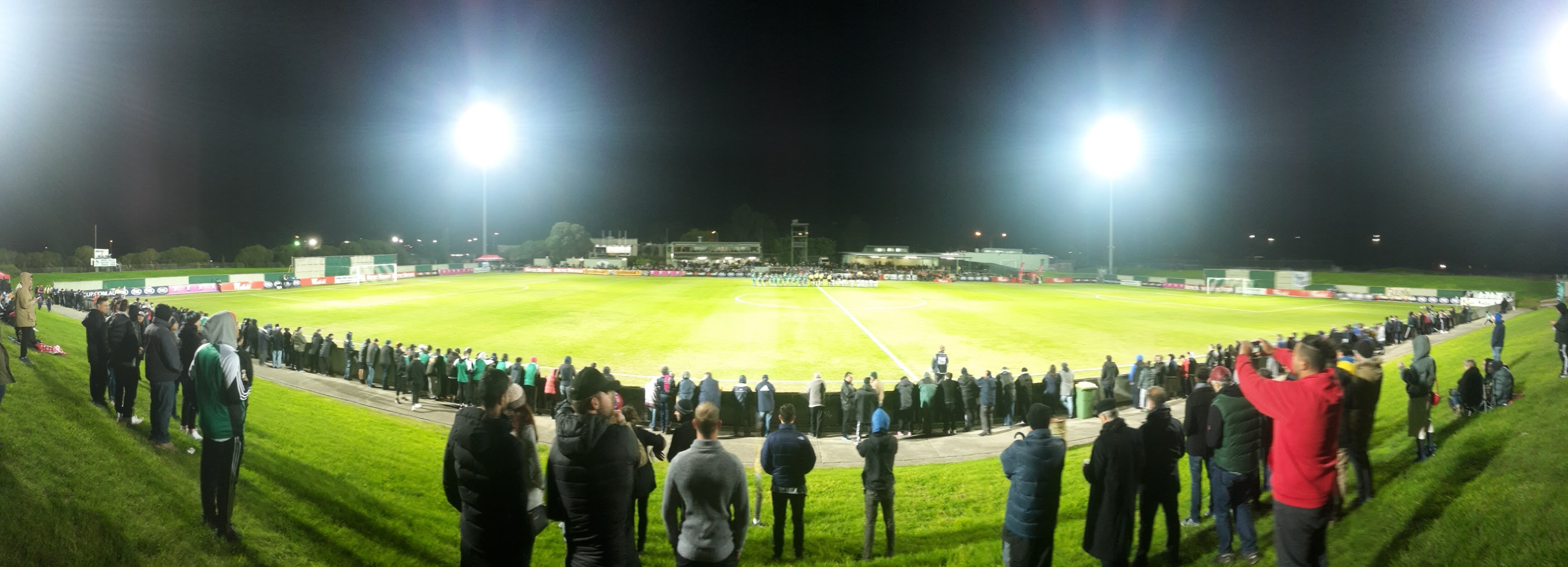
Panorama of Green Gully Reserve with Green Gully hosting Central Coast Mariners in the FFA Cup, August 2016

Gully placed third in the league in 2012 and made it all the way to the preliminary final, but went down to Dandenong Thunder. After a fifth placed league finish in 2013, Gully exited the finals series at the first stage after a 1–0 loss to South Melbourne.

Green Gully had their bid for a place in the inaugural National Premier Leagues Victoria accepted and entered the competition in 2014. The NPLV replaced the old VPL. The Cavaliers finished in 10th place in the new 14 team competition in 2014, and finished in 7th place the following year, just missing out on the finals series. Bob Stojcevski departed the club mid-season after an extended period of poor form, with Rodrigo Vargas (as player-coach) and Stephen Downes taking on the head role to see out the season.

In October 2015, Green Gully announced that former Oakleigh Cannons boss Arthur Papas would lead the club in the 2016 NPL Victoria season. Papas brought in the likes of former Brisbane Roar youngster George Lambadaridis, former Melbourne Heart midfielder Kliment Taseski and Japanese left-back Yohei Iwasaki for the 2016 campaign. Gully qualified for the national stage of the 2016 FFA Cup, drawing A-League side Central Coast Mariners in the Round of 32 and became at the time only the second member federation club to beat an A-League club when Liam Boland's 92nd minute long-range goal saw the Cavaliers win the tie 2–1 in front of 900 people at Green Gully Reserve. In the Round of 16, Gully came up against local rivals and NPL Victoria compatriots Melbourne Knights FC. Despite the hosts taking a 1–0 lead early on at Knights Stadium, a Nicholas Krousoratis goal wedged between a Liam Boland brace saw the visitors progress to the quarter-finals of the competition in front of 2,472 people. Gully were handed its first interstate opponent in the final eight, when it drew NPL Capital Football side Canberra Olympic, losing 1–0 in Canberra. In the league, Gully finished in 5th place, losing 5–2 to Oakleigh in the elimination final.

On 23 February 2017, it was announced that Papas would be leaving his position as manager of Green Gully to join Saudi Professional League club Ettifaq FC as assistant coach to former Villareal coach Eelco Schattorie for the remainder of the Saudi Professional League season. He was replaced by Green Gully's U20's Head Coach Brian Vanega. Gully finished in fifth place in the league, losing 4–0 to Bentleigh Greens in the elimination final.

In 2018, Papas retook the senior coaching job, but again departed, joining Schattorie at NorthEast United FC in the Indian Super League. Stephen Downes, who won the Victorian Premier League in 2011 and Dockerty Cup in 2013 with Gully, took over as manager of the club. Gully finished the season in 12th place, winning just one of its last 16 games. The 12th-placed finish meant that Gully went into the promotion-relegation playoff, where the took on Moreland City FC at AAMI Park. Gully, who were 2–0 down, scored in the 91st and 94th minute to take the game to extra time, where Krousoratis eventually scored a winner for Green Gully, retaining the club's top flight status.

In 2019, Harry Ho made his debut for the Senior team. Playing in defensive midfield as he made an instant impact with the team claiming a 3–0 victory against Bentleigh Greens.

== Rivalries ==
The Green Gully Cavaliers have many rivalries, the biggest of the rivalries are the Sunshine George Cross FC with most games containing controversy. Other Victorian Premier League Clubs that are rivals include Melbourne Knights, South Melbourne FC and Non-Victorian Premier League rivalries include Keilor Park SC and the St. Albans Saints.

== Kit supplier ==
The Kit Supplier for the Green Gully Cavaliers is Kappa, Kappa is the match day kit supplier and training kit supplier. Green Gully's matchday kit is green with white stripes, while the shorts and socks are just green. The green gully juniors also have their kit supplier as Kappa.

== Current squad ==
As of 28 March 2026

Note: Flags indicate national team as defined under FIFA eligibility rules; some limited exceptions apply. Players may hold more than one non-FIFA nationality.

No.	Pos.	Nation	Player
1	GK	AUS	Luka Romic
2	DF	AUS	Judd McDougall
3	DF	SSD	Amanhom Khamis
4	DF	ENG	Taofiq Olomowewe
5	DF	AUS	Jalil Regague
6	DF	AUS	Matthew Crooks
8	MF	AUS	Ashton Ahluwalia
9	FW	SOM	Bilal Habib
10	FW	AUS	Gianluca Iannucci
11	MF	SCO	Scott Lochhead
12	DF	AUS	Phillip Pannuzio

No.	Pos.	Nation	Player
16	MF	AUS	Joshua Hope
17	MF	AUS	Elioan Kifle
18	FW	NZL	Nathan Simes
19	MF	SAM	Rushonn Tafunai
20	FW	NZL	Wan Gatkek
21	DF	AUS	Tom Woerndl
22	GK	AUS	Michael Weier
23	MF	SWE	Oskar Karlsson
24	MF	AUS	Cooper Head
25	MF	AUS	Diego Cuba
41	FW	SOM	Yusuf Ahmed

== Honours ==
- National Soccer League Participants 1984, 1985, 1986
- Victorian Premier League/ (State League) Champions 1981, 1982, 1983, 1999, 2000, 2003, 2005, 2010, 2011
- Victorian Premier League (State League) Minor Premiers 2004, 2005, 2008, 2011
- Victorian Premier League (State League) Finalists 1992, 1996, 1997, 1998, 2002, 2004, 2006
- Victorian Premier League (State League) Runners Up 1987
- Victorian Metropolitan League Division 1 Champions 1976
- Victorian Metropolitan League Division 2 Champions 1971
- Victorian Metropolitan League Division 3 Runners Up 1966
- Dockerty Cup Winners 1981, 1982, 1986, 2004, 2013
- Dockerty Cup Runners up 2016
- Victorian Ampol Night Soccer Cup Winners 1979, 1981, 1983

== Individual honours ==
- Bill Fleming Award
- 1980 – Jimmy Dunne
- 1982 – Paul Lewis
- 1983 – Paul Lewis
- 2005 – Rodrigo Vargas
- Victorian Premier League Coach of the Year
- 1999 – Ian Dobson
- Victorian Premier League Top Goalscorer of the Year
- 1982 – Paul Lewis
- 1983 – Paul Lewis
- 1991 – Sash Becvinovski
- 1992 – Sash Becvinovski
- Victorian Premier League Goalkeeper of the Year
- 2000 – Robert Brian
- 2008 – Steven Tilovski
- Victorian Premier League Under 21 Player of the Year
- 2003 – Simon Storey
- Weinstein Medal winners
- 1980 – Danny Beranic
- Jimmy Rooney Medal
- 2003 – Simon Storey
- 2005 – Brandon Vassallo
- 2010 – Graham Hockless
- 2011 – Stephen Downes
