= Joshua Rawlins =

Australian-Malaysian soccer player (born 2004)

- Rawlins with Dundee United in 2026

Personal information
- Full name: Joshua James Rawlins
- Date of birth: 23 April 2004 (age 22)
- Place of birth: Perth, Australia
- Height: 1.81 m (5 ft 11 in)
- Position: Right back

Team information
- Current team: Dundee United
- Number: 23

Youth career
- Dianella SC
- Perth Glory

Senior career*
Years	Team	Apps	(Gls)
2019–2021	Perth Glory NPL	26	(1)
2020–2022	Perth Glory	34	(0)
2022–2024	Jong Utrecht	24	(0)
2024	→ Perth Glory (loan)	12	(1)
2024–2026	Melbourne Victory	40	(0)
2026–	Dundee United	0	(0)

International career^{‡}
2019	Australia U15	5	(0)
2019	Australia U17	6	(0)
2022–2023	Australia U20	7	(0)
2022–	Australia U23	13	(2)
- * Club domestic league appearances and goals as of 10 February 2026 ‡ National team caps and goals as of 7 September 2025

Joshua James Rawlins (born 23 April 2004) is an Australian professional soccer player who plays as a right back for Scottish Premiership club Dundee United.

== Early life ==
Born in Perth, Rawlins played for Dianella Soccer Club during his childhood, before joining Perth Glory's development sector in 2015.

He attended Our Lady's Assumption Primary School in Dianella, and then continued his study path at Chisholm Catholic College in Bedford.

== Club career ==
=== Perth Glory ===
After coming through the youth ranks of Perth Glory and playing both in the A-League Youth and the National Premier Leagues with their youth sides, Rawlins made his professional debut on 18 November 2020, starting the match against Shanghai Shenhua in the group stage of the 2020 AFC Champions League, which Perth eventually lost 1-2. In the occasion, he became the youngest player to ever feature in an ACL game, at 16 years, six months and 26 days. He would go on playing three more matches in the continental tournament, two of which as a starter, as his side finished last in their group and failed to progress to the next round.

On 20 January 2021, Rawlins made his debut in the A-League, starting the match against Adelaide United as his team eventually gained a 5-3 win: at 16 years and 272 days, he became the youngest ever player to feature in the starting XI for a league match. Under the manager Richard Garcia, he went on to collect eleven more appearances during the campaign (seven of which as a starter), as Perth finished the regular season at the bottom of the league table.

Finally, on 24 November 2021, the full-back debuted in the FFA Cup, coming in as a substitute for Tyler Vecchio at the 66th minute of the play-off match against Melbourne Victory, with the visitors eventually winning the match at penalty shoot-outs. During the 2021-2022 season, Rawlins established himself more as a regular starter in the team, collecting a total amount of 23 appearances between the league and the national cup, although Perth Glory finished last in the A-League and got left out of the final play-offs for the second year in a row.

=== Utrecht ===
On 4 May 2022, it was officially announced that Rawlins would join Utrecht on 1 July for an undisclosed fee, signing a four-year contract with the Dutch club and becoming their fifth ever Australian player in the process, after Tommy Oar, Adam Sarota, Michael Zullo and Daniel Arzani.

On 11 June 2024, Utrecht announced that Rawlins had terminated his contract with the club by mutual consent.

==== Loan to Perth Glory ====
On 29 January 2024, Perth announced the re-signing of Rawlins on loan. In May 2024, the club confirmed that Rawlins had returned to his parent club.

=== Melbourne Victory ===
On 28 June 2024, it was officially announced that Rawlins had signed for Melbourne Victory.

=== Dundee United ===
In May 2026, Rawlins signed a contract with Scottish side Dundee United, joining former A-League Men players Jesse Randall and Lachlan Rose.

== International career ==
Rawlins was born in Australia to a half Malaysian mother. He has represented Australia at several youth international levels.

He was the captain of the national selection at the 2019 AFF U-15 Championship, where his side failed to progress to the knock-out stage.

In the same year, he was also included in the squad that took part in the FIFA Under-17 World Cup in Brazil: being the youngest player of the bunch, Rawlins played all the three matches in the group stage of the competition, as the Joeys managed to progress to the knock-out phase as one of the best third-placed teams, before eventually getting eliminated by France in the round of 16.

In May 2022, Rawlins was called-up to the under-23 national team to take part in the AFC U-23 Asian Cup in Uzbekistan, once again being the youngest member in the squad. He subsequently made his debut for the Olyroos on June 4, starting their second group stage fixture against Iraq: in the occasion, he assisted Alou Kuol's opening goal, as the match eventually ended in a 1-1 draw. After losing to eventual champions Saudi Arabia in the semi-finals, Australia also lost the third place match against Japan and finished fourth overall in the continental tournament.

== Style of play ==
Rawlings primarily plays as a right back, though he has demonstrated that he can play in any position across the backline, as well as a defensive midfielder. He's been described as an athletic footballer, who has his strengths in his passing and dribbling skills, as well as in the defensive phase.

In 2021, the British newspaper The Guardian included him in their annual list of the most promising talents in world football, alongside his fellow countryman Mohamed Toure.

== Career statistics ==
As of 10 February 2026

Appearances and goals by club, season and competition
Club	Season	League			National Cup		Continental		Other		Total	
Club	Season	Division	Apps	Goals	Apps	Goals	Apps	Goals	Apps	Goals	Apps	Goals
Perth Glory	2019–20	A-League	0	0	0	0	4	0	—		4	0
Perth Glory	2020–21	A-League	12	0	1	0	—		—		13	0
Perth Glory	2021–22	A-League	22	0	1	0	—		—		23	0
Perth Glory	Perth Glory Total		34	0	2	0	4	0	0	0	40	0
Utrecht	2022-23	Eredivisie	0	0	0	0	—		—		0	0
Jong Utrecht	2022-23	Eerste Divisie	24	0	0	0	—		—		24	0
Perth Glory	2023-24	A-League Men	12	1	0	0	—		—		12	1
Melbourne Victory	2023-24	A-League Men	—		4	0	—		—		4	0
Melbourne Victory	2024-25	A-League Men	19	0	1	0	—		4	0	24	0
Melbourne Victory	2025-26	A-League Men	21	0	1	0	—		1	0	23	0
Melbourne Victory	Melbourne Victory Total		40	0	6	0	0	0	5	0	51	0
Career total			110	1	8	0	0	0	5	0	127	1

== See also ==
- List of Perth Glory FC players (25–99 appearances)
