= Judd McDougall =

Australian soccer player

Personal information
- Full name: Judd McDougall
- Place of birth: Australia
- Height: 1.94 m (6 ft 4 in)
- Position: Defender

Team information
- Current team: Perth SC

Youth career
- Perth Glory

Senior career*
Years	Team	Apps	(Gls)
2021–2023	Perth Glory	0	(0)
2022–2023	Perth Glory NPL	30	(0)
2024–	Perth SC	0	(0)
- * Club domestic league appearances and goals as of 22 February 2024

Judd McDougall (born 6 April 2005) is an Australian professional soccer player who plays as a defender for Perth SC. He made his professional debut in a FFA Cup playoff match against Melbourne Victory on 24 November 2021.
