= Jonathan Aspropotamitis =

Australian soccer player

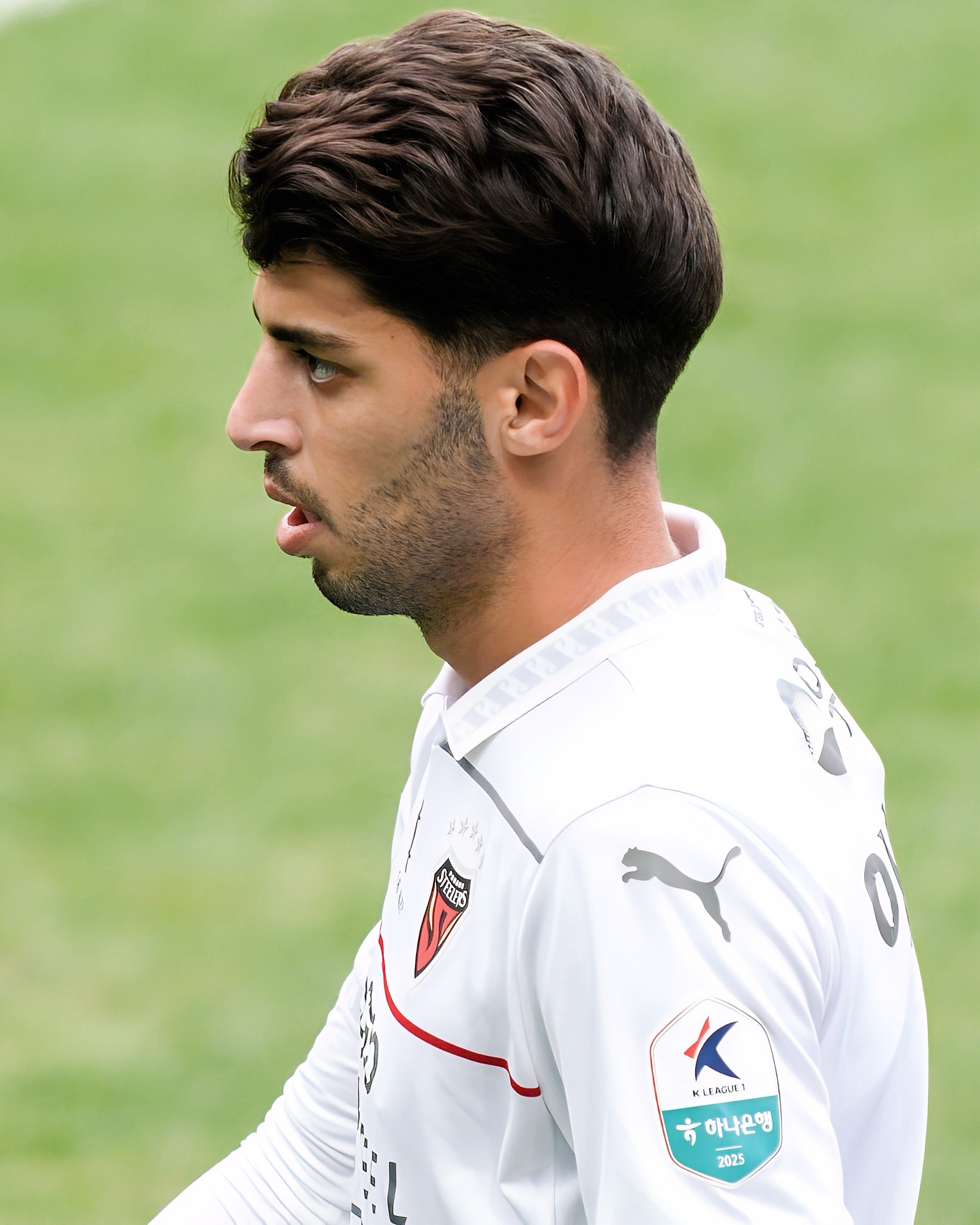
- Aspropotamitis in 2025

Personal information
- Full name: Jonathan Aspropotamitis
- Date of birth: 7 June 1996 (age 30)
- Place of birth: Paddington, New South Wales, Australia
- Height: 1.88 m (6 ft 2 in)
- Position: Central defender

Team information
- Current team: Macarthur FC
- Number: 5

Youth career
- Queens Park
- 2009–2011: Sydney University
- 2012: Parramatta FC
- 2013: APIA Leichhardt
- 2014: Sydney Olympic
- 2014–2015: Western Sydney Wanderers

Senior career*
Years	Team	Apps	(Gls)
2015–2018	Western Sydney Wanderers	43	(0)
2016	Western Sydney Wanderers NPL	5	(0)
2018–2019	Central Coast Mariners	13	(0)
2019–2020	Western United	9	(0)
2020–2022	Perth Glory	31	(0)
2022–2023	Macarthur FC	31	(1)
2024–2026	Pohang Steelers	13	(0)
2026–	Macarthur FC	0	(0)

International career^{‡}
2015	Australia U-20	2	(0)
2017–2018	Australia U-23	4	(1)
- * Club domestic league appearances and goals as of 5 January 2026 ‡ National team caps and goals as of 30 July 2020

Jonathan Aspropotamitis (Greek: Τζόναθαν Ασπροποταμίτης; born 7 June 1996) is an Australian professional soccer player who plays for A-League Men club Macarthur FC.

== Early life ==
Aspropotamitis was born on 7 June 1996 in Paddington, a suburb in Sydney, New South Wales. He is of Greek descent. He was educated at Newington College, an independent, co-educational Uniting Church school in the suburb of Stanmore in Sydney's Inner West.

== Club career ==
=== Western Sydney Wanderers ===
Aspropotamitis made his professional debut on 11 March 2015 vs Melbourne City FC in a 3–2 victory for the Western Sydney Wanderers at Pirtek Stadium. He also made his Asian Champions League debut on 7 April 2015 vs FC Seoul in a 1–1 draw at Pirtek Stadium.

Aspropotamitis signed his 1st professional senior contract with the Western Sydney Wanderers on 31 May 2015.

Early in the 2015–16 season Aspropotamitis got the opportunity to fill in for the experienced Alberto Aguilar who sustained an injury in the round 4 encounter v Perth Glory. An assured display from the young centre back, coupled with the Wanderers first win of the season, lead to his selection over the following weeks.

A string of solid performances lead the Wanderers to move quickly and extend the young centre backs contract for a further 2 seasons, Wanderers CEO said of the signing "We think he will continue to develop here and really go to the next level as a centre back. He has the maturity, the composure and the determination to become a very important player for this club and we are delighted to have him sign for an additional two years."

=== Central Coast Mariners ===
On 14 May 2018, the Western Sydney Wanderers announced the departure of Aspropotamitis, who was then signed by the Central Coast Mariners on a one-year deal.

=== Western United ===
On 15 April 2019, Aspropotamitis signed a 2-year deal for new A-League side Western United.

=== Perth Glory ===
In November 2020, Aspropotamitis was selected as part of the 2020 AFC Asian Champions League squad which played out the remaining games, which were originally postponed due the COVID-19 pandemic, in Qatar. He scored Perth Glory's first ever goal in continental competition in a 1–2 loss against Shanghai Shenhua.

=== Macarthur FC ===
Aspropotamitis joined Macarthur FC ahead of the 2022-23 season.

On 28 December 2023, Macarthur announced that a transfer had been agreed with a club based in Asia, pending a medical evaluation from his future club.

=== Pohang Steelers ===
Aspropotamitis joined Pohang Steelers ahead of the 2023 KLeague 1 season

He made his debut on February 14 in the Asian Champions League R16 clash v Jeonbuk Motors and his League debut in the season opener v Ulsan Hyundai.

== International career ==
In 2017 Aspropotamitis was part of the Australia men's national under-23 soccer team squad which competed in the 2018 AFC U-23 Championship qualification tournament. He played in all three games as captain, while being voted Man of the Match in the first match and scoring a goal in the final match.

== Career statistics ==
As of 23 December 2023.

Appearances and goals by club, season and competition
Club	Season	League			Cup		International		Other		Total	
Club	Season	Division	Apps	Goals	Apps	Goals	Apps	Goals	Apps	Goals	Apps	Goals
Western Sydney Wanderers	2014–15	A-League	8	0	0	0	1	0	—		9	0
Western Sydney Wanderers	2015–16	A-League	5	0	0	0	—		—		5	0
Western Sydney Wanderers	2016–17	A-League	24	0	2	0	4	0	—		30	0
Western Sydney Wanderers	2017–18	A-League	6	0	2	0	—		—		8	0
Western Sydney Wanderers	Total		43	0	4	0	5	0	—		52	0
Central Coast Mariners	2018–19	A-League	13	0	—		—		—		13	0
Western United	2019–20	A-League	9	0	—		—		—		9	0
Perth Glory	2020–21	A-League	18	0	—		4	1	—		22	1
Perth Glory	2021–22	A-League Men	13	0	—		—		—		13	0
Perth Glory	Total		31	0	—		4	1	—		35	1
Macarthur FC	2022–23	A-League Men	22	1	5	1	—		—		27	2
Macarthur FC	2023–24	A-League Men	9	0	2	0	2	0	—		13	0
Macarthur FC	Total		31	1	7	1	2	0	—		40	2
Career total			127	1	11	1	11	1	0	0	149	3

== Honours ==
Western Sydney Wanderers

- Y-League: 2017–18

Macarthur

- Australia Cup: 2022
