= Aidan Coyne =

Australian soccer player (born 2004)

Personal information
- Full name: Aidan John Coyne
- Date of birth: 12 May 2004 (age 22)
- Place of birth: Luton, England
- Height: 1.82 m (6 ft 0 in)
- Position: Defender

Team information
- Current team: Hume City

Youth career
- ECU Joondalup
- Perth Glory

Senior career*
Years	Team	Apps	(Gls)
2020–2022	Perth Glory NPL	38	(2)
2021–2022	Perth Glory	7	(0)
2022–2025	Watford	0	(0)
2024–2025	→ Maidenhead United (loan)	2	(0)
2025	→ St Albans City (loan)	6	(0)
2026–	Hume City	0	(0)
- * Club domestic league appearances and goals as of 20:23, 21 September 2025 (UTC)

Aidan John Coyne (born 12 May 2004), is an English-born Australian professional footballer who plays as a defender for National Premier Leagues Victoria club Hume City.

== Career ==
He made his professional debut for Perth Glory in a FFA Cup playoff match against Melbourne Victory on 24 November 2021.

After seven senior appearances for Glory, Coyne moved back to England to sign a professional contract with Watford in November 2022.

On 4 December 2024, Coyne joined Maidenhead United on a 28-day loan.

In March 2025, Coyne joined St Albans City on loan until the end of the season.

Coyne was released by Watford at the end of the 2024-25 season.

In February 2026, Coyne signed for Hume City.

== Personal life ==
Coyne is the son of former Socceroo Chris and the grandson of former Socceroo John. His uncle Jamie is also a former soccer player. Aidan Coyne was born in England while his father was playing for Luton Town.
