= Darko Stanojević (footballer, born 1997) =

Serbian footballer

Personal information
- Full name: Darko Stanojević
- Date of birth: 30 September 1997 (age 29)
- Place of birth: Loznica, Yugoslavia
- Height: 1.87 m (6 ft 2 in)
- Positions: Midfielder; defender

Team information
- Current team: Loznica
- Number: 5

Youth career
- –2017: Loznica
- 2015–2016: → Radnik Bijeljina (loan)

Senior career*
Years	Team	Apps	(Gls)
2017–2021	Loznica	16	(0)
2017–2018	→ Sloboda Užice (loan)	3	(0)
2021	Neftchi	0	(0)
2021	Sogdiana Jizzakh	13	(0)
2022	Perth Glory	1	(0)
2022–2023	Loznica	11	(1)
2023	Metalac Gornji Milanovac	8	(0)
2023	Radnički Klupci		
2024–	Loznica		
- * Club domestic league appearances and goals as of 25 June 2023 ‡ National team caps and goals as of 21 January 2022

Darko Stanojević (born 30 September 1997) is a Serbian professional footballer who plays as a midfielder or defender for Loznica.

He also holds Australian citizenship.
