= Joshua Anasmo =

Australian soccer player

Personal information
- Date of birth: 14 May 2002 (age 24)
- Position: Forward

Team information
- Current team: Bayswater City

Youth career
- 2016–2019: Stirling Macedonia
- 2020–2021: Floreat Athena
- 2021–2023: Perth Glory

Senior career*
Years	Team	Apps	(Gls)
2019	Stirling Macedonia	1	(0)
2021	Floreat Athena	3	(5)
2021–2023	Perth Glory NPL	54	(16)
2021–2022	Perth Glory	8	(0)
2024–	Bayswater City	15	(3)
- * Club domestic league appearances and goals as of 23 November 2023

Joshua Anasmo (born 14 May 2002) is an Australian soccer player who plays as a forward for Bayswater City.

== Early life ==
Born on 14 May 2002, Anasmo was raised in Ellenbrook, Western Australia and attended Emmanuel Christian Community School in Girrawheen. He has a younger brother, Joel, who is also a footballer.

== Club career ==
=== Perth Glory ===
Anasmo began his football career at Stirling Macedonia and Floreat Athena, playing for both clubs' senior sides. He notably scored a hat-trick for Floreat Athena on 29 March 2021 in a 4–0 victory over Perth Glory Academy. Anasmo was later signed within a week by Perth Glory, alongside his brother, and scored on his debut for the Academy side against Cockburn City on 10 April 2021.

Anasmo scored on his first-team debut on 24 November 2021 in an FFA Cup match against Melbourne Victory. Perth lost after a 4–3 penalty shoot-out, following a 1–1 draw in regular time. He made his A-League (and starting) debut at Leichhardt Oval on 26 March 2022 in a 2–1 defeat to Wellington Phoenix.
