= Anthony Leban =

Australian soccer player

Personal information
- Full name: Anthony Leban
- Place of birth: Australia
- Position: Central midfielder

Team information
- Current team: North Geelong Warriors

Youth career
- North Geelong Warriors
- 2018–: Melbourne Victory

Senior career*
| Years | Team | Apps | (Gls) |
| 2018 | North Geelong Warriors | 4 | (0) |
| 2019–2022 | Melbourne Victory NPL | 24 | (3) |
| 2021–2022 | Melbourne Victory | 0 | (0) |
| 2022– | North Geelong Warriors | 7 | (0) |
- * Club domestic league appearances and goals as of 18 November 2022

Anthony Leban, is an Australian professional footballer who recently plays as a midfielder for Melbourne Victory. He made his professional debut in a FFA Cup playoff match against Perth Glory on 24 November 2021. Leban scored a penalty in the 96th minute to give Melbourne Victory a 1–0 victory over Adelaide City in the 2021 FFA Cup round of 32.

Leban is of Croatian descent. His father, Stan, is a football coach and former player.
