= Ciaran Bramwell =

Australian professional soccer

Personal information
- Full name: Ciaran Bramwell
- Date of birth: 12 February 2002 (age 24)
- Place of birth: Australia
- Position: Forward

Team information
- Current team: Heidelberg United

Youth career
- ECU Joondalup
- 2017–2019: Perth Glory

Senior career*
Years	Team	Apps	(Gls)
2019–2022	Perth Glory NPL	42	(13)
2021–2022	Perth Glory	27	(3)
2022–2025	Melbourne Knights	76	(32)
2025–	Heidelberg United	4	(2)
- * Club domestic league appearances and goals as of 3 November 2025 ‡ National team caps and goals as of 3 March 2021

Ciaran Bramwell (born 12 February 2002), is an Australian professional soccer player who plays as a forward for National Premier Leagues Victoria club Heidelberg United.

== Clubs career ==
=== Perth Glory ===
In 2021, Bramwell join the A-League Men club Perth Glory for one season.

=== Melbourne Knights ===
In 2022, Bramwell join for National Premier Leagues Victoria club Melbourne Knights.
