= 2021 Football West season =

Football West Season 2021
- League: National Premier Leagues Western Australia
- Sport: Soccer
- Duration: 2021

NPL WA Season
- Champions: Perth SC
- Premiers: Perth SC

State Cup
- Cup Winners: Floreat Athena

Football West seasons
- ← 2020 2022 →

The 2021 Football West season was the 121st season of competitive association football in Western Australia and the eighth season since the establishment of the National Premier Leagues WA (NPL).

== Pre-season changes ==
Due to the disruptions to the 2020 season due to the COVID-19 pandemic in Australia, there was no promotion and relegation at the end of the 2020 season.

== League Tables ==
=== 2021 National Premier Leagues WA ===
The competition was a double round-robin played over 22 rounds, followed by an end of season Top 4 Cup competition. The NPL Premier normally qualifies for the national NPL finals series, but the 2021 National Premier Leagues finals series was cancelled.

Pos	Team	Pld	W	D	L	GF	GA	GD	Pts	Qualification or relegation
1	Perth SC (C)	22	14	6	2	37	18	+19	48	2021 NPL WA Finals
2	Floreat Athena	22	13	5	4	48	27	+21	44	2021 NPL WA Finals
3	Sorrento	22	12	6	4	41	27	+14	42	2021 NPL WA Finals
4	Perth Glory Youth	22	10	7	5	42	25	+17	37	2021 NPL WA Finals
5	Inglewood United	22	10	4	8	48	41	+7	34	
6	ECU Joondalup	22	10	2	10	37	34	+3	32	
7	Armadale	22	7	6	9	36	44	−8	27	
8	Bayswater City	22	8	3	11	39	49	−10	27	
9	Cockburn City	22	6	5	11	27	36	−9	23	
10	Gwelup Croatia	22	3	10	9	34	43	−9	19	
11	Balcatta	22	4	7	11	28	44	−16	19	
12	Rockingham City (R)	22	4	1	17	19	48	−29	13	Relegation to the 2022 WA State League 1

Source: mygameday
Rules for classification: 1) points; 2) goal difference; 3) number of goals scored.
(C) Champions; (R) Relegated

==== Top Four Cup ====
Semi-finals
1	Perth SC	4
2	Floreat Athena	0
3	Sorrento	1
4	Perth Glory Youth (a.e.t.)	3

Preliminary Final
Floreat Athena	2
Perth Glory Youth	1

Grand Final
Perth SC	6
Floreat Athena	3

=== 2021 WA State League 1 ===
The 2021 WA State League 1 season was a double round-robin played over 22 rounds, followed by an end of season Top 4 Cup competition.

Pos	Team	Pld	W	D	L	GF	GA	GD	Pts	Qualification or relegation
1	Stirling Macedonia (P)	22	17	4	1	69	31	+38	55	Promotion to the 2022 National Premier Leagues WA, and Top Four Cup
2	Western Knights	22	11	7	4	56	33	+23	40	State League Top Four Cup
3	Quinns FC	22	12	4	6	50	38	+12	40	State League Top Four Cup
4	Joondalup United (C)	22	11	6	5	41	35	+6	39	State League Top Four Cup
5	Fremantle City	22	8	8	6	37	31	+6	32	
6	Forrestfield United	22	8	7	7	35	26	+9	31	
7	Olympic Kingsway	22	8	4	10	29	29	0	28	
8	Mandurah City	22	8	4	10	40	46	−6	28	
9	UWA-Nedlands	22	7	4	11	31	36	−5	25	
10	Subiaco AFC	22	6	3	13	26	45	−19	21	
11	Swan United (R)	22	4	4	14	25	55	−30	16	2021 Relegation play-offs
12	Ashfield (R)	22	4	1	17	22	56	−34	13	Relegation to the 2022 State League 2

Source: mygameday
Rules for classification: 1) points; 2) goal difference; 3) number of goals scored.
(C) Champions; (P) Promoted; (R) Relegated

==== Finals ====
Semi-finals
1	Stirling Macedonia	1
4	Joondalup United	2
2	Western Knights	2
3	Quinns	3

Grand Final
Quinns	1
Joondalup United	3

==== Inter-divisional promotion/relegation play-offs ====
Semi-finals
SL1 11	Swan United	3	1	4
SL2 4	Kingsley Westside	2	1	3
SL2 2	Gosnells City	0	4	4
SL2 3	Murdoch University Melville	2	3	5

Final
Swan United	1	0	1
Murdoch University Melville	1	3	4

=== 2021 WA State League 2 ===
The 2021 WA State League 2 season was a double round-robin played over 22 rounds, followed by a promotion/relegation competition.

Pos	Team	Pld	W	D	L	GF	GA	GD	Pts	Qualification or relegation
1	Dianella White Eagles (C, P)	22	20	1	1	68	20	+48	61	Promotion to the 2022 WA State League 1
2	Gosnells City	22	13	4	5	52	23	+29	43	2021 Promotion play-offs
3	Murdoch University Melville (P)	22	13	2	7	32	24	+8	41	Promotion to the 2022 WA State League 1
4	Kingsley Westside	22	12	4	6	49	28	+21	40	2021 Promotion play-offs
5	Wanneroo City	22	11	6	5	33	29	+4	39	
6	Carramar Shamrock Rovers	22	8	5	9	40	36	+4	29	
7	Balga SC	22	8	5	9	29	29	0	29	
8	Curtin University	22	6	7	9	22	34	−12	25	
9	Joondalup City	22	6	6	10	41	45	−4	24	
10	Morley-Windmills	22	6	4	12	30	45	−15	22	
11	Canning City	22	5	0	17	30	53	−23	15	
12	Kelmscott Roos (R)	22	1	2	19	19	79	−60	5	Relegation to the 2022 Amateur Premier Division

Source: mygameday
Rules for classification: 1) points; 2) goal difference; 3) number of goals scored.
(C) Champions; (P) Promoted; (R) Relegated

=== 2021 NPL Women ===
Women's National Premier League
- Season: 2021
- Champions: Murdoch University Melville

The 2021 NPL WA Women was the second season in the National Premier Leagues WA Women format. It was played over 21 rounds as a triple round-robin, followed by an end of season Top 4 Cup competition.

Pos	Team	Pld	W	D	L	GF	GA	GD	Pts	Qualification or relegation
1	Murdoch University Melville (C)	21	17	2	2	81	15	+66	53	NPLWA-W Top Four Cup
2	Northern Redbacks	21	16	3	2	51	19	+32	51	NPLWA-W Top Four Cup
3	Perth SC	21	10	2	9	43	27	+16	32	NPLWA-W Top Four Cup
4	Fremantle City	21	9	3	9	33	34	−1	30	NPLWA-W Top Four Cup
5	Football West NTC U-19	21	8	5	8	39	41	−2	29	
6	Balcatta	21	8	1	12	28	35	−7	25	
7	Curtin University	21	2	5	14	21	80	−59	11	
8	Subiaco AFC	21	2	3	16	13	58	−45	9	

Source: mygameday
Rules for classification: 1) points; 2) goal difference; 3) number of goals scored.
(C) Champions

==== Finals ====
Semi-finals
1	Murdoch University Melville	3
2	Northern Redbacks	2
3	Perth SC	2
4	Fremantle City	0

Preliminary Final
Northern Redbacks	1
Perth SC (a.e.t.)	2

Grand Final
Murdoch University Melville	2
Perth SC	0

== 2021 Men's State Cup ==
Western Australian soccer clubs competed in the Football West State Cup competition (known as the Belt Up State Cup for sponsorship reasons), initially involving teams from various divisions of the Amateur League and Metropolitan League competitions, and from regional teams from the Goldfields, South West and Great Southern regions. In later rounds, teams from the two divisions of the State League and the National Premier Leagues WA entered.

This knockout competition was won by Floreat Athena, their 8th title.

The competition also served as the Western Australian Preliminary rounds for the 2021 FFA Cup. The two finalists – ECU Joondalup and Floreat Athena – qualified for the final rounds, entering at the Round of 32.

== 2021 Women's State Cup ==
Western Australian soccer clubs competed in the Football West Women's State Cup competition, which involved teams from both the NPLW WA and State League Women's competitions.

This knockout competition was won by Murdoch University Melville, their 1st title.

Quarterfinals
Murdoch University Melville	2
South West Phoenix	0
Sorrento FC	0
Northern Redbacks	2
Balcatta FC	1 (4)
Perth SC	1 (3)
Fremantle City	3
Football West NTC U-19	1

Semifinals
Murdoch University Melville (a.e.t.)	5
Northern Redbacks	2
Balcatta FC	2
Fremantle City	0

Finals
Murdoch University Melville	2
Balcatta FC	0
