= 2023 Football West season =

123rd season of competitive spccer in Western Australia

Football West Season 2023
- League: National Premier Leagues Western Australia
- Sport: Soccer
- Duration: March 2023 – September 2023

NPL WA Season
- Champion: Stirling Macedonia
- Premier: Perth RedStar

State Cup
- Cup Winners: Cockburn City

Football West seasons
- ← 2022 2024 →

The 2023 Football West season was the 123rd season of competitive soccer in Western Australia and the 10th season since the establishment of the National Premier Leagues WA (NPL).

== Pre-season changes ==
2022 League	Promoted to league	Relegated from league
NPL WA	Olympic Kingsway	Gwelup Croatia
State League 1	Gosnells City	Quinns FC
State League 2	Maddington Kalamunda White City FC	South West Phoenix
NPL Women	–	–

== League Tables ==
=== 2023 National Premier Leagues WA ===
The competition was held as a double round-robin played over 22 rounds, completed on 27 August, followed by an end of season Top 4 Cup competition.

Pos	Team	Pld	W	D	L	GF	GA	GD	Pts	Qualification or relegation
1	Perth RedStar	22	12	5	5	54	26	+28	41	2023 NPL WA Finals
2	Stirling Macedonia (C)	22	11	5	6	37	29	+8	38	2023 NPL WA Finals
3	Olympic Kingsway	22	10	4	8	35	32	+3	34	2023 NPL WA Finals
4	Perth SC	22	10	3	9	42	40	+2	33	2023 NPL WA Finals
5	Armadale SC	22	10	2	10	52	49	+3	32	
6	Bayswater City	22	8	6	8	45	50	−5	30	
7	Balcatta FC	22	8	5	9	35	37	−2	29	
8	Perth Glory Youth	22	8	4	10	51	55	−4	28	
9	Inglewood United	22	7	6	9	38	39	−1	27	
10	Floreat Athena	22	8	3	11	29	34	−5	27	
11	Sorrento FC (R)	22	8	3	11	39	48	−9	27	Promotion/relegation play-offs
12	Cockburn City (R)	22	6	6	10	27	45	−18	24	Relegation to the 2024 State League 1

Rules for classification: 1) points; 2) goal difference; 3) number of goals scored.
(C) Champions; (R) Relegated

==== Top four cup ====
Semi-finals
1	Perth RedStar	1
2	Stirling Macedonia	0
3	Olympic Kingsway	0
4	Perth SC	3

Preliminary Final
Stirling Macedonia	2 (4)
Perth SC	2 (3)

Grand Final
Perth RedStar	0
Stirling Macedonia	2

=== 2023 WA State League 1 ===
Pos	Team	Pld	W	D	L	GF	GA	GD	Pts	Qualification or relegation
1	Western Knights (P)	22	16	3	3	53	19	+34	51	Promotion to the 2024 NPL WA
2	Mandurah City	22	16	2	4	61	22	+39	50	Promotion/relegation play-offs
3	Fremantle City (P)	22	12	3	7	51	35	+16	39	Promotion/relegation play-offs
4	Joondalup United	22	11	5	6	45	34	+11	38	Promotion/relegation play-offs
5	Dianella White Eagles	22	10	5	7	44	44	0	35	
6	Gwelup Croatia	22	8	7	7	37	38	−1	31	
7	Murdoch University Melville	22	8	3	11	46	54	−8	27	
8	Gosnells City	22	6	8	8	36	45	−9	26	
9	Rockingham City	22	6	5	11	30	47	−17	23	
10	UWA-Nedlands	22	6	4	12	30	51	−21	22	
11	Subiaco AFC (O)	22	5	4	13	36	50	−14	19	Promotion/relegation play-offs
12	Forrestfield United (R)	22	1	5	16	21	51	−30	8	Relegation to the 2024 State League 2

Updated to match(es) played on unknown. Source:
Rules for classification: 1) points; 2) goal difference; 3) number of goals scored.
(O) Play-off winners; (P) Promoted; (R) Relegated

==== Inter-divisional promotion/relegation play-offs ====
Semi-finals
SL1 2	Mandurah City	0	1	1
SL1 3	Fremantle City	2	3	5
NPL 11	Sorrento FC	0	2	2
SL1 4	Joondalup United (Note: won on away goals)	0	2	2

Final
Fremantle City	3
Joondalup United	1

=== 2023 WA State League 2 ===
Pos	Team	Pld	W	D	L	GF	GA	GD	Pts	Qualification or relegation
1	Kingsley-Westside (P)	22	17	1	4	63	27	+36	52	Promotion to the 2024 State League 1
2	Maddington Kalamunda White City	22	14	3	5	48	28	+20	45	Promotion/relegation play-offs
3	Curtin University	22	13	2	7	48	25	+23	41	Promotion/relegation play-offs
4	Swan United	22	11	5	6	50	35	+15	38	Promotion/relegation play-offs
5	Carramar Shamrock Rovers	22	11	2	9	37	33	+4	35	
6	Wanneroo City	22	9	2	11	38	38	0	29	
7	Ashfield SC	22	7	5	10	38	39	−1	26	
8	Joondalup City	22	6	4	12	38	46	−8	22	
9	Quinns FC	22	5	5	12	25	49	−24	20	
10	Balga SC	22	4	4	14	21	51	−30	16	
11	Canning City	22	3	7	12	22	56	−34	16	
12	Morley-Windmills (R)	22	10	4	8	40	41	−1	3 (Note: Morley were deducted thirty-one points for breaching profitability and sustainability rules.)	Relegation to the 2024 Amateur Premier Division

Rules for classification: 1) points; 2) goal difference; 3) number of goals scored.
(P) Promoted; (R) Relegated

==== Inter Divisional relegation/promotion playoffs ====
Semi-finals
SL1 11	Subiaco AFC	3	1	4
SL2 4	Swan United	1	2	3
SL2 3	Curtin University	1	2	3
SL2 2	Maddington Kalamunda WC	1	1	2

Final
Subiaco AFC	2
Curtin University	0

== 2023 State Cup ==
Western Australian soccer clubs competed in the Football West State Cup competition, which initially involved teams from the Amateur League and Metropolitan League competitions, and from regional teams from the South West and Great Southern regions. In the third round, teams from the two divisions of the State League entered, and in the fourth round teams from the National Premier Leagues WA entered.

The competition also served as the Western Australian Preliminary rounds for the 2023 Australia Cup. The two finalists – Floreat Athena and Inglewood United – qualified for the final rounds, entering at the Round of 32.

The final was played on 2 September, and won by Floreat Athena 3–2, their ninth title.

== 2023 NPL Women ==
The 2023 NPL WA Women was the fourth season in the National Premier Leagues WA Women format. It was played over 21 rounds as a triple round-robin, followed by an end of season Top 4 Cup competition.

Pos	Team	Pld	W	D	L	GF	GA	GD	Pts	Qualification or relegation
1	Perth RedStar (C)	21	15	4	2	78	21	+57	49	NPLWA-W Top Four Cup
2	Perth SC	21	13	3	5	78	28	+50	42	NPLWA-W Top Four Cup
3	Fremantle City	21	13	1	7	56	35	+21	40	NPLWA-W Top Four Cup
4	Football West NTC U-19	21	12	2	7	63	40	+23	38	NPLWA-W Top Four Cup
5	Balcatta	21	9	3	9	55	37	+18	30	
6	Murdoch University Melville	21	7	5	9	54	41	+13	26	
7	Subiaco AFC	21	5	2	14	40	64	−24	17	
8	Curtin University	21	0	0	21	8	166	−158	0	

Source: Squadi
Rules for classification: 1) points; 2) goal difference; 3) number of goals scored.
(C) Champions

=== Top four cup ===
Semi-finals
1	Perth RedStar	5
2	Perth SC	1
3	Fremantle City	1
4	Football West NTC U-19	3

Preliminary Final
Perth SC	3
Football West NTC U-19	0

Grand Final
Perth RedStar	4
Perth SC	1
