= 2020 Football West season =

Football West Season 2020
- League: National Premier Leagues Western Australia
- Sport: Soccer
- Duration: 2020

NPL WA Season
- Champions: Floreat Athena
- Premiers: ECU Joondalup

Football West seasons
- ← 2019 2021 →

The 2020 Football West season was the 120th season of competitive association football in Western Australia and the seventh season since the establishment of the National Premier Leagues WA (NPL).

All NPL and grassroots competitions were suspended for one month due to the impacts from the COVID-19 pandemic in Australia, effective 18 March to 14 April, and further extended until early July. The NPL, NPL Women's and Men's State League competitions resumed from 3 July, with grassroots football having recommenced from 21 June.

== Pre-season changes ==
2019 League	Promoted to league	Relegated from league
NPL WA	Gwelup Croatia	Stirling Lions
State League 1	Quinns; Swan United	Morley-Windmills; South West Phoenix (withdrew)
State League 2	Kingsley Westside FC	–
Women's Premier League	Curtin University; Murdoch University Melville; Perth SC; Subiaco AFC	Queen's Park FC; Stirling Panthers

== League Tables ==
=== 2020 National Premier Leagues WA ===
Only the first round of the double round-robin season was played before the competition was suspended due to restrictions relating to the coronavirus pandemic. The season resumed on 3 July, with results from the matches played in March no longer counting, and promotion/relegation being suspended. After the first 11 rounds of the season, the teams were split into an Upper Table (top 6) and a Lower Table (bottom 6), with teams in each section playing each other once, with all points and goals reset to zero. The Premier was declared as the Upper Table leader at the end of round 16. There was also a separate Finals series, between the top three teams of the Upper table, and the top team of the Lower Table, which was won by Floreat Athena. The NPL Premier normally qualifies for the national NPL finals series, but the 2020 National Premier Leagues finals series was cancelled in July.

==== Stage 1 ====
Pos	Team	Pld	W	D	L	GF	GA	GD	Pts	Qualification or relegation (Note: Teams were split into two groups (Upper Table and Lower Table) after each have played 11 matches.)
1	Floreat Athena	11	8	1	2	24	13	+11	25	Qualification to Upper Table
2	Gwelup Croatia	11	7	2	2	30	14	+16	23	Qualification to Upper Table
3	Cockburn City	11	6	2	3	17	9	+8	20	Qualification to Upper Table
4	ECU Joondalup	11	6	1	4	25	15	+10	19	Qualification to Upper Table
5	Sorrento	11	5	3	3	28	24	+4	18	Qualification to Upper Table
6	Armadale	11	5	0	6	24	25	−1	15	Qualification to Upper Table
7	Bayswater City	11	4	3	4	18	19	−1	15	
8	Inglewood United	11	4	2	5	16	18	−2	14	
9	Perth Glory Youth	11	4	1	6	17	24	−7	13	
10	Perth SC	11	3	3	5	17	18	−1	12	
11	Balcatta	11	1	5	5	15	22	−7	8	
12	Rockingham City	11	1	1	9	10	40	−30	4	

Source: sportstg.com
Rules for classification: 1) points; 2) goal difference; 3) number of goals scored.

==== Stage 2 ====
Pos	Team	Pld	W	D	L	GF	GA	GD	Pts	Qualification or relegation (Note: Teams were split into two groups (Upper Table and Lower Table) after each played 11 matches in the first Stage.)
1	ECU Joondalup (C)	5	3	1	1	15	4	+11	10	Finals series
2	Cockburn City	5	3	1	1	11	8	+3	10	Finals series
3	Floreat Athena	5	3	0	2	9	6	+3	9	Finals series
4	Gwelup Croatia	5	2	1	2	10	7	+3	7	
5	Sorrento	5	1	1	3	6	16	−10	4	
6	Armadale	5	1	0	4	7	17	−10	3	
7	Perth SC	5	3	1	1	15	5	+10	10	Finals series
8	Balcatta	5	3	0	2	10	8	+2	9	
9	Perth Glory Youth	5	2	2	1	8	6	+2	8	
10	Inglewood United	5	2	1	2	7	6	+1	7	
11	Bayswater City	5	2	1	2	6	10	−4	7	
12	Rockingham City	5	0	1	4	4	15	−11	1	

Source: Upper table (sportstg.com) Lower table (sportstg.com)
Rules for classification: 1) points; 2) goal difference; 3) number of goals scored.
(C) Champions

==== Finals ====
Semi-finals
U1	ECU Joondalup	1
L1	Perth SC (a.e.t.)	3
U2	Cockburn City	0
U3	Floreat Athena	2

Grand Final
L1	Perth SC	0
U2	Floreat Athena	4

=== 2020 WA State League 1 ===
The 2020 WA State League 1 season was originally scheduled to be played over 22 rounds as a double round-robin. The season commenced on 4 July, with promotion/relegation being suspended. After the first 11 rounds of the season, the teams were split into an Upper Table (top 6) and a Lower Table (bottom 6), with teams in each section playing each other once, with all points and goals reset to zero. The Champion was declared as the Upper Table leader at the end of round 16. No Premier was declared. There was also a separate Finals series, between the top three teams of the Upper table, and the top team of the Lower Table.

==== Stage 1 ====
Pos	Team	Pld	W	D	L	GF	GA	GD	Pts	Qualification or relegation (Note: Teams were split into two groups (Upper Table and Lower Table) after each have played 11 matches.)
1	Western Knights	11	9	1	1	27	6	+21	28	Qualification to Upper Table
2	Olympic Kingsway	11	6	2	3	29	17	+12	20	Qualification to Upper Table
3	Forrestfield United	11	5	3	3	19	17	+2	18	Qualification to Upper Table
4	Fremantle City	11	4	5	2	19	15	+4	17	Qualification to Upper Table
5	Mandurah City	11	5	2	4	18	16	+2	17	Qualification to Upper Table
6	Joondalup United	11	5	2	4	24	25	−1	17	Qualification to Upper Table
7	Quinns	11	5	1	5	19	18	+1	16	
8	Stirling Lions	11	4	2	5	21	19	+2	14	
9	UWA-Nedlands	11	4	1	6	21	22	−1	13	
10	Ashfield	11	4	1	6	19	26	−7	13	
11	Subiaco AFC	11	2	2	7	13	24	−11	8	
12	Swan United	11	2	0	9	12	36	−24	6	

Source: sportstg.com
Rules for classification: 1) points; 2) goal difference; 3) number of goals scored.

==== Stage 2 ====
Pos	Team	Pld	W	D	L	GF	GA	GD	Pts	Qualification or relegation (Note: Teams were split into two groups (Upper Table and Lower Table) after each played 11 matches in the first Stage.)
1	Olympic Kingsway (C)	5	3	1	1	12	7	+5	10	Finals series
2	Western Knights	5	2	2	1	10	5	+5	8	Finals series
3	Fremantle City	5	2	1	2	10	11	−1	7	Finals series
4	Mandurah City	5	2	1	2	7	9	−2	7	
5	Forrestfield United	5	1	2	2	9	12	−3	5	
6	Joondalup United	5	0	3	2	6	10	−4	3	
7	Stirling Lions	5	4	0	1	12	5	+7	12	Finals series
8	Quinns	5	3	2	0	15	2	+13	11	
9	UWA-Nedlands	5	2	2	1	13	6	+7	8	
10	Subiaco AFC	5	1	3	1	4	8	−4	6	
11	Swan United	5	0	2	3	5	20	−15	2	
12	Ashfield	5	0	1	4	5	13	−8	1	

Source: Upper table (sportstg.com) Lower table (sportstg.com)
Rules for classification: 1) points; 2) goal difference; 3) number of goals scored.
(C) Champions

==== Finals ====
Semi-finals
U1	Olympic Kingsway	3
L1	Stirling Lions	1
U2	Western Knights	0
U3	Fremantle City	2

Grand Final
U1	Olympic Kingsway	2
U3	Fremantle City	0

=== 2020 WA State League 2 ===
The 2020 WA State League 2 season was originally scheduled to be played over 22 rounds as a double round-robin. The season started on 4 July, with promotion/relegation being suspended. After the first 11 rounds of the season, the teams were split into an Upper Table (top 6) and a Lower Table (bottom 6), with teams in each section playing each other once, with all points and goals reset to zero. The Champion was declared as the Upper Table leader at the end of round 16. No Premier was declared. There was also a separate Finals series, between the top three teams of the Upper table, and the top team of the Lower Table.

==== Stage 1 ====
Pos	Team	Pld	W	D	L	GF	GA	GD	Pts	Qualification or relegation (Note: Teams were split into two groups (Upper Table and Lower Table) after each have played 11 matches.)
1	Murdoch University Melville	11	8	1	2	24	14	+10	25	Qualification to Upper Table
2	Dianella White Eagles	11	7	0	4	28	15	+13	21	Qualification to Upper Table
3	Carramar Shamrock Rovers	11	6	2	3	20	16	+4	20	Qualification to Upper Table
4	Joondalup City	11	5	4	2	22	13	+9	19	Qualification to Upper Table
5	Gosnells City	11	5	2	4	30	24	+6	17	Qualification to Upper Table
6	Wanneroo City	11	5	1	5	26	19	+7	16	Qualification to Upper Table
7	Canning City	11	5	1	5	20	19	+1	16	
8	Kingsley Westside	11	4	2	5	19	18	+1	14	
9	Balga SC	11	3	3	5	16	25	−9	12	
10	Morley-Windmills	11	3	2	6	19	19	0	11	
11	Kelmscott	11	2	2	7	13	34	−21	8	
12	Curtin University	11	2	2	7	10	31	−21	8	

Source: sportstg.com
Rules for classification: 1) points; 2) goal difference; 3) number of goals scored.

==== Stage 2 ====
Pos	Team	Pld	W	D	L	GF	GA	GD	Pts	Qualification or relegation (Note: Teams were split into two groups (Upper Table and Lower Table) after each played 11 matches in the first stage.)
1	Carramar Shamrock Rovers (C)	5	4	0	1	10	4	+6	12	Finals series
2	Dianella White Eagles	5	2	2	1	7	6	+1	8	Finals series
3	Wanneroo City	5	2	1	2	15	11	+4	7	Finals series
4	Joondalup City	5	2	1	2	6	9	−3	7	
5	Murdoch University Melville	5	1	2	2	6	10	−4	5	
6	Gosnells City	5	0	2	3	9	13	−4	2	
7	Morley-Windmills	5	4	0	1	13	3	+10	12	Finals series
8	Canning City	5	3	2	0	11	5	+6	11	
9	Kingsley Westside	5	2	2	1	14	13	+1	8	
10	Kelmscott Roos	5	2	1	2	10	9	+1	7	
11	Curtin University	5	0	2	3	5	10	−5	2	
12	Balga SC	5	0	1	4	3	16	−13	1	

Source: Upper table (sportstg.com) Lower table (sportstg.com)
Rules for classification: 1) points; 2) goal difference; 3) number of goals scored.
(C) Champions

==== Finals ====
Semi-finals
U1	Carramar Shamrock Rovers	2
L1	Morley-Windmills	0
U2	Dianella White Eagles	1
U3	Wanneroo City	0

Grand Final
U1	Carramar Shamrock Rovers	3
U2	Dianella White Eagles	1

=== 2020 NPL Women ===
Women's National Premier League
- Season: 2020
- Champions: Murdoch University Melville

The 2020 NPL WA Women was the first season in the new National Premier Leagues WA Women format. It was initially meant to be played over 21 rounds as a triple round-robin, but later rescheduled as a double round-robin, with promotion/relegation being suspended. The Champion was declared as the leader at the end of round 14. No Premier was declared.

Pos	Team	Pld	W	D	L	GF	GA	GD	Pts	Qualification or relegation
1	Murdoch University Melville FC (C)	14	10	2	2	41	12	+29	32	Finals series
2	Perth SC	14	8	2	4	24	16	+8	26	Finals series
3	Fremantle City	14	7	2	5	28	13	+15	23	Finals series
4	Northern Redbacks	14	6	4	4	23	14	+9	22	Finals series
5	Football West NTC U-19	14	5	5	4	35	24	+11	20	
6	Balcatta	14	5	3	6	30	20	+10	18	
7	Curtin University	14	3	4	7	15	31	−16	13	
8	Subiaco AFC	14	0	2	12	4	70	−66	2	

Source: sportstg.com
Rules for classification: 1) points; 2) goal difference; 3) number of goals scored.
(C) Champions

==== Finals ====
Semi-finals
1	Murdoch University Melville	1 (4)
4	Northern Redbacks	1 (5)
2	Perth SC	1
3	Fremantle City	6

Grand Final
Northern Redbacks	0 (2)
Fremantle City	0 (1)

== 2020 State Cup ==
Western Australian soccer clubs commenced the Football West State Cup competition in February, only to see it suspended due to the impacts from the pandemic. At the time of suspension, only the first two rounds had been played, involving teams from various divisions of the Amateur League and Metropolitan League competitions, and from regional teams from the Goldfields, South West and Great Southern regions. With the return to competitions in June, there was a decision by Football West not to proceed with cup competitions in general. These first two rounds were part of the parallel 2020 FFA Cup preliminary rounds, which competition was also cancelled.
