= 2022 Football West season =

Football West Season 2022
- League: National Premier Leagues Western Australia
- Sport: Soccer
- Duration: 2022

NPL WA Season
- Champion: Perth RedStar
- Premier: Floreat Athena

State Cup
- Cup Winners: Cockburn City

Football West seasons
- ← 2021 2023 →

The 2022 Football West season was the 122nd season of competitive association football in Western Australia and the ninth season since the establishment of the National Premier Leagues WA (NPL).

== Pre-season changes ==
In February 2022, ECU Joondalup SC and Northern Redbacks SC announced a merger to create Perth RedStar FC as a new club.

2021 League	Promoted to league	Relegated from league
NPL WA	Stirling Macedonia	Rockingham City
State League 1	Dianella White Eagles; Murdoch University Melville	Ashfield; Swan United
State League 2	South West Phoenix	Kelmscott Roos
NPL Women	–	–

== League tables ==
=== 2022 National Premier Leagues WA ===
The competition was held as a double round-robin played over 22 rounds, completed on 27 August, followed by an end of season Top 4 Cup competition.

Pos	Team	Pld	W	D	L	GF	GA	GD	Pts	Qualification or relegation
1	Floreat Athena	22	14	5	3	54	35	+19	47	2022 NPL WA Finals
2	Perth RedStar (C)	22	15	0	7	62	32	+30	45	2022 NPL WA Finals
3	Stirling Macedonia	22	13	4	5	29	22	+7	43	2022 NPL WA Finals
4	Sorrento FC	22	12	4	6	50	34	+16	40	2022 NPL WA Finals
5	Bayswater City	22	11	6	5	51	37	+14	39	
6	Inglewood United	22	9	3	10	26	27	−1	30	
7	Armadale SC	22	8	5	9	39	44	−5	29	
8	Perth Glory Youth	22	8	4	10	32	39	−7	28	
9	Perth SC	22	7	6	9	35	29	+6	27	
10	Cockburn City	22	5	7	10	29	38	−9	22	
11	Balcatta FC	22	3	4	15	17	51	−34	13	
12	Gwelup Croatia (R)	22	1	4	17	18	54	−36	7	Relegation to the 2023 WA State League 1

Source: mygameday
Rules for classification: 1) points; 2) goal difference; 3) number of goals scored.
(C) Champions; (R) Relegated

==== Top four cup ====
Semi-finals
1	Floreat Athena	2
2	Perth RedStar	1
3	Stirling Macedonia	0
4	Sorrento FC	2

Preliminary Final
Perth RedStar	3
Sorrento FC	2

Grand Final
Floreat Athena	2
Perth RedStar	3

=== 2022 WA State League 1 ===
Pos	Team	Pld	W	D	L	GF	GA	GD	Pts	Qualification or relegation
1	Olympic Kingsway (P)	22	19	1	2	63	15	+48	58	Promotion to the 2023 NPL WA, and Finals series
2	Mandurah City (C)	22	15	2	5	71	33	+38	47	2022 State League Finals series
3	Western Knights	22	15	1	6	47	29	+18	46	2022 State League Finals series
4	Fremantle City	22	13	2	7	50	28	+22	41	2022 State League Finals series
5	Murdoch University Melville	22	11	3	8	40	33	+7	36	
6	Rockingham City	22	8	5	9	39	47	−8	29	
7	Joondalup United	22	7	4	11	30	44	−14	25	
8	Forrestfield United	22	7	4	11	33	53	−20	25	
9	Dianella White Eagles	22	6	3	13	30	47	−17	21	
10	Subiaco AFC	22	5	5	12	31	47	−16	20	
11	UWA-Nedlands	22	5	2	15	26	46	−20	17	Promotion/relegation play-offs
12	Quinns FC (R)	22	3	4	15	28	66	−38	13	Relegation to the 2023 State League 2

Source: mygameday
Rules for classification: 1) points; 2) goal difference; 3) number of goals scored.
(C) Champions; (P) Promoted; (R) Relegated

==== State League finals series ====
Semi-finals
1	Olympic Kingsway	3
4	Fremantle City	2
2	Mandurah City	4
3	Western Knights	2

Grand Final
Olympic Kingsway	0
Mandurah City	1

==== Inter-divisional promotion/relegation play-offs ====
Semi-finals
SL1 11	UWA-Nedlands	1	2	3
SL2 4	Kingsley-Westside	1	1	2
SL2 2	Carramar Shamrock Rovers	2	2	4
SL2 3	Swan United	2	1	3

Final
UWA-Nedlands	0	2	2
Carramar Shamrock Rovers	1	0	1

=== 2022 WA State League 2 ===
Pos	Team	Pld	W	D	L	GF	GA	GD	Pts	Qualification or relegation
1	Gosnells City (P)	21	16	2	3	53	23	+30	50	Promotion to the 2023 State League 1
2	Carramar Shamrock Rovers	22	15	0	7	59	26	+33	45	Promotion/relegation play-offs
3	Swan United	22	12	2	8	47	32	+15	38	Promotion/relegation play-offs
4	Kingsley-Westside	22	9	9	4	54	40	+14	36	Promotion/relegation play-offs
5	Curtin University	22	10	6	6	45	33	+12	36	
6	Balga SC	21	9	5	7	34	34	0	32	
7	Morley-Windmills	22	7	5	10	41	44	−3	26	
8	Joondalup City	22	7	5	10	26	34	−8	26	
9	Ashfield SC	22	6	5	11	27	43	−16	23	
10	Canning City	22	7	2	13	26	46	−20	23	
11	Wanneroo City	22	4	8	10	38	56	−18	20	
12	South West Phoenix (R)	22	2	3	17	29	71	−42	9	Relegation to the 2023 Amateur Premier Division

Source: mygameday
Rules for classification: 1) points; 2) goal difference; 3) number of goals scored.
(P) Promoted; (R) Relegated

=== 2022 NPL Women ===
Women's National Premier League
- Season: 2022
- Champions: Perth RedStar

The 2022 NPL WA Women was the third season in the National Premier Leagues WA Women format. It was played over 21 rounds as a triple round-robin, followed by an end of season Top 4 Cup competition.

Pos	Team	Pld	W	D	L	GF	GA	GD	Pts	Qualification or relegation
1	Perth RedStar (C)	21	18	3	0	76	9	+67	57	NPLWA-W Top Four Cup
2	Perth SC	21	12	4	5	45	14	+31	40	NPLWA-W Top Four Cup
3	Fremantle City	21	11	4	6	50	33	+17	37	NPLWA-W Top Four Cup
4	Football West NTC U-19	21	8	5	8	35	41	−6	29	NPLWA-W Top Four Cup
5	Murdoch University Melville	21	8	3	10	25	28	−3	27	
6	Balcatta	21	8	2	11	26	31	−5	26	
7	Subiaco AFC	21	6	3	12	34	61	−27	21	
8	Curtin University	21	0	2	19	19	93	−74	2	

Source: mygameday
Rules for classification: 1) points; 2) goal difference; 3) number of goals scored.
(C) Champions

==== Top four cup ====
Semi-finals
1	Perth RedStar	1
2	Perth SC	0
3	Fremantle City	0
4	Football West NTC U-19	2

Preliminary Final
Perth SC	1
Football West NTC U-19 (a.e.t.)	2

Grand Final
Perth RedStar	3
Football West NTC U-19	0

== 2022 State Cup ==
Western Australian soccer clubs competed in the Football West State Cup competition, which initially involved teams from the Amateur League and Metropolitan League competitions, and from regional teams from the South West and Great Southern regions. In the third round, teams from the two divisions of the State League entered, and in the fourth round teams from the National Premier Leagues WA entered.

The competition also served as the Western Australian Preliminary rounds for the 2022 Australia Cup. The two finalists – Armadale SC and Cockburn City – qualified for the final rounds, entering at the Round of 32.

The final was played on 24 July, and won by Cockburn City, their seventh title (five of their first six having been won by the predecessor club Spearwood Dalmatinac).
