= 2018 Football West State Cup =

Tournament details
- Teams: 67

Western Australian soccer clubs competed in 2018 for the Football West State Cup, known as the Belt Up Cup for sponsorship reasons. Clubs entered from the National Premier Leagues WA, the two divisions of the State League, a limited number of teams from various divisions of the 2018 Amateur League competition, and from regional teams from the South West, Goldfields and Great Southern regions.

This knockout competition was won by Armadale, their 1st title.

The competition also served as the Western Australian Preliminary Rounds for the 2018 FFA Cup. The two finalists – Armadale SC and Gwelup Croatia – qualified for the final rounds, entering at the Round of 32.

== Format ==
Round	Clubs remaining	Winners from previous round	New entries this round	Match Dates
Round 2	67	none	32	11–18 Mar
Round 3	51	16	22	23–29 Mar
Round 4	32	19	13	2 Apr
Round 5	16	16	none	25 Apr
Round 6	8	8	none	19–20 May
Round 7	4	4	none	4 Jun
Final	2	2	none	14 Jul

== Second round ==
The round numbers conform to a common format throughout the 2018 FFA Cup preliminary rounds. A total of 32 teams took part in this stage of the competition, from lower divisions of the Amateur League, and from regional teams entering from the South West, Great Southern and Goldfields regions. Matches in this round were played between 11–18 March. For matches where the scores were equal at full-time, they went straight to penalties.

Tie no	Home team (tier)	Score	Away team (tier)
1	Dalyellup Park Rangers (-)	Walkover	Northern City (-)
2	Bunbury United (-)	3–0	Kalamunda United (13)
3	Murray District Rangers (-)	1–9	Kingsley SC (5)
4	Collie Power (-)	1–6	BrOzzy Sports Club (12)
5	Kwinana United (5)	4–2	North Beach (-)
6	Canning Buffers (-)	Walkover	Cracovia White Eagles (7)
7	Albany Rovers (-)	1–2	Yanchep United (-)
8	Maccabi (-)	1–2	Phoenix Glory (-)
9	Sporting Warriors (-)	Walkover	Albany Bayswater (-)

Tie no	Home team (tier)	Score	Away team (tier)
10	Hamersley Rovers (5)	2–1	Joondanna Blues (10)
11	Challenger FC (-)	0–8	Perth AFC (-)
12	Wembley Downs (5)	2–4	Bunbury Dynamos (-)
13	Fraser Park (-)	0–0	Warnbro Strikers SC (7)
Warnbro Strikers advance 5–4 on penalties.
14	Perth Royals (6)	0–3	Busselton City SC (-)
15	Southern Spirit (5)	2–2	Woodvale FC (9)
Woodvale FC advance 4–2 on penalties.
16	Ballajura AFC (7)	Walkover	Boulder City (-)

== Third round ==
A total of 38 teams took part in this stage of the competition. New teams that enter at this round were from Football West State League Division 1 (11 teams) and Football West State League Division 2 (11 teams). Matches in this round were played on 23–29 March.

Tie no	Home team (tier)	Score	Away team (tier)
1	Olympic Kingsway (4)	3–0	Mandurah City FC (-)
2	Phoenix Glory (-)	1–5	Swan United (4)
3	South West Phoenix (3)	10–0	Yanchep United (-)
4	Kingsley SC (5)	1–5	Rockingham City (3)
5	Dianella White Eagles (3)	7–0	Curtin University (4)
6	Bunbury United (-)	1–4	Busselton City SC (-)
7	Kwinana United (5)	4–0	Warnbro Strikers SC (7)
8	Canning City (4)	Walkover	Ballajura AFC (7)
9	Northern City (-)	5–8	Bunbury Dynamos (-)
10	Balga (4)	4–1	Shamrock Rovers (4)

Tie no	Home team (tier)	Score	Away team (tier)
11	Joondalup City (3)	1–5	Ashfield (3)
12	Wanneroo City (4)	7–1	Woodvale FC (9)
13	BrOzzy Sports Club (12)	Walkover	Cracovia White Eagles (7)
14	Murdoch Uni–Melville (4)	0–3	Fremantle City FC (3)
15	Morley-Windmills (3)	1–2	Kelmscott Roos (4)
16	Gwelup Croatia (3)	3–1	Quinns (4)
17	UWA-Nedlands (3)	6–2	Hamersley Rovers (5)
18	Perth AFC (-)	0–6	Western Knights (3)
19	Albany Bayswater (-)	1–5	Gosnells City (4)

== Fourth round ==
A total of 32 teams took part in this stage of the competition. Clubs from the National Premier Leagues WA entered into the competition at this stage, with the exception of Perth Glory Youth who were not eligible. Matches in this round were played on 2 April.

Tie no	Home team (tier)	Score	Away team (tier)
1	Inglewood United (2)	1–3	ECU Joondalup (2)
2	South West Phoenix (3)	0–3	Forrestfield United (2)
3	Kwinana United (5)	0–8	Gwelup Croatia (3)
4	Rockingham City (3)	2–3	Armadale SC (2)
5	Olympic Kingsway (4)	2–3	Cockburn City (2)
6	Balga (4)	0–1	Floreat Athena (2)
7	Busselton City SC (-)	1–5	Subiaco AFC (2)
8	Kelmscott Roos (4)	0–1	UWA-Nedlands (3)

Tie no	Home team (tier)	Score	Away team (tier)
9	Balcatta (2)	8–0	BrOzzy Sports Club (12)
10	Fremantle City (3)	0–1	Joondalup United (2)
11	Gosnells City (4)	0–10	Bayswater City (2)
12	Dianella White Eagles (3)	5–1	Canning City (4)
13	Stirling Lions (2)	10–0	Bunbury Dynamos (-)
14	Western Knights (3)	0–1	Sorrento (2)
15	Ashfield (3)	0–4	Perth (2)
16	Wanneroo City (4)	2–4	Swan United (4)

== Fifth round ==
A total of 16 teams took part in this stage of the competition. Matches in this round were played on 25 April.

Tie no	Home team (tier)	Score	Away team (tier)
1	Gwelup Croatia (3)	3–1†	Cockburn City (2)
2	Bayswater City (2)	1–2	Floreat Athena (2)
3	Balcatta (2)	2–3†	Armadale (2)
4	Swan United (4)	1–6	Dianella White Eagles (3)

Tie no	Home team (tier)	Score	Away team (tier)
5	Subiaco AFC (2)	3–1	Stirling Lions (2)
6	ECU Joondalup (2)	5–0	UWA-Nedlands (3)
7	Sorrento (2)	3–4	Perth (2)
8	Joondalup United (2)	1–4	Forrestfield United (2)

Notes:

- † = After Extra Time

== Sixth round ==
A total of 8 clubs took part at this stage of the competition. Matches were played on 19–20 May.

Tie no	Home team (tier)	Score	Away team (tier)
1	Armadale (2)	5–2	Dianella White Eagles (2)
2	ECU Joondalup (2)	5–0	Forrestfield United (2)
3	Floreat Athena (2)	2–1†	Perth (2)
Floreat Athena advance 4–3 on penalties.
4	Gwelup Croatia (3)	1–1†	Subiaco AFC (2)

Notes:

- † = After Extra Time

== Seventh round ==
A total of 4 clubs took part at this stage of the competition. Matches were played on 4 June.

Tie no	Home team (tier)	Score	Away team (tier)
1	Gwelup Croatia (3)	4–1	Floreat Athena (2)
2	Armadale (2)	3–2	ECU Joondalup (2)

== Final ==
The 2018 State Cup Final, known as the Belt Up State Cup Final for sponsorship reasons, was played on 14 July 2018, at the neutral venue of Dorrien Gardens.

14 July 2018	Armadale SC	2–0	Gwelup Croatia	Dorrien Gardens
15:00	Jackson 11', 50'	Report		Referee: Stephen Gregory
