= 2024 Football West season =

Football West
- Season: 2024
- Dates: 23 March – 7 September 2024
- Champions: Olympic Kingsway
- Premiers: Olympic Kingsway
- State Cup: Olympic Kingsway

The 2024 Football West season was the 124th season of competitive association football in Western Australia and the 11th season since the establishment of the National Premier Leagues WA (NPL).

The premiers of the top tier of Western Australian football were Olympic Kingsway, who also defeated Stirling Macedonia 3−2 in the NPL WA grand final to become champions. The State Cup was also won by Olympic Kingsway with a 3−2 victory over Perth RedStar after extra time.

== Pre-season changes ==
2023 League	Promoted to league	Relegated from league
NPL WA	Western Knights and Fremantle City FC	Sorrento FC and Cockburn City
State League 1	Kingsley-Westside FC	Forrestfield United
State League 2	East Perth FC	Morley-Windmills
NPL Women	UWA Nedlands	Curtin University

== League tables ==
=== 2024 National Premier Leagues WA ===
The competition was held as a double round-robin played over 22 rounds, completed on 31 August, followed by an end of season finals competition.

Pos	Team	Pld	W	D	L	GF	GA	GD	Pts	Qualification or relegation
1	Olympic Kingsway (C)	22	16	4	2	60	27	+33	52	2024 NPL WA Finals
2	Perth RedStar	22	14	4	4	44	29	+15	46	2024 NPL WA Finals
3	Fremantle City	22	11	3	8	46	36	+10	36	2024 NPL WA Finals
4	Stirling Macedonia	22	11	3	8	42	40	+2	36	2024 NPL WA Finals
5	Bayswater City	22	9	6	7	53	39	+14	33	
6	Floreat Athena	22	11	3	8	43	33	+10	33 (Note: Floreat Athena were deducted six points (three suspended) for breaches of the codes of conduct and spectator code of behaviour.)	
7	Armadale SC	22	8	7	7	54	43	+11	31	
8	Western Knights	22	8	5	9	35	33	+2	29	
9	Balcatta FC	22	6	6	10	30	42	−12	24	
10	Perth SC	22	6	5	11	45	54	−9	23	
11	Perth Glory Youth (O)	22	3	5	14	35	68	−33	14	Qualification for relegation play-off
12	Inglewood United (R)	22	2	3	17	23	66	−43	9	Relegation to 2025 WA State League 1

Rules for classification: 1) points; 2) goal difference; 3) number of goals scored.
(C) Champions; (O) Play-off winners; (R) Relegated

==== Finals ====
Semi-finals
1	Olympic Kingsway (p)	1 (6)
2	Perth RedStar	1 (5)
3	Fremantle City	2
4	Stirling Macedonia	3

Preliminary Final
2	Perth RedStar	0
4	Stirling Macedonia	3

Grand Final
1	Olympic Kingsway (a.e.t.)	3
4	Stirling Macedonia	2

=== 2024 WA State League 1 ===
Pos	Team	Pld	W	D	L	GF	GA	GD	Pts	Qualification or relegation
1	Sorrento FC (C, P)	22	20	2	0	75	14	+61	62	Promotion to 2025 NPL WA
2	Dianella White Eagles	22	14	3	5	53	34	+19	45	Promotion/relegation play-offs
3	Murdoch University Melville	22	13	3	6	53	43	+10	42	Promotion/relegation play-offs
4	Mandurah City	22	13	2	7	50	37	+13	41	Promotion/relegation play-offs
5	Subiaco AFC	22	11	4	7	35	34	+1	37	
6	UWA-Nedlands	22	8	3	11	41	34	+7	27	
7	Gwelup Croatia	22	8	3	11	45	54	−9	27	
8	Kingsley-Westside FC	22	8	2	12	37	52	−15	26	
9	Joondalup United	22	7	3	12	51	61	−10	24	Withdrew after end of season (Note: On 18 September 2024, Joondalup United withdrew from all State League competitions due to financial difficulties.)
10	Gosnells City	22	6	2	14	31	49	−18	20	
11	Cockburn City (R)	22	6	1	15	28	54	−26	19	Promotion/relegation play-offs (Note: On 20 September 2024, Football West announced that because of the withdrawal of Joondalup United from State League 1, both teams that qualified for the Playoff/Relegation final would be promoted.)
12	Rockingham City (R)	22	3	2	17	24	57	−33	11	Relegation to 2025 State League 2

Rules for classification: 1) points; 2) goal difference; 3) number of goals scored.
(C) Champions; (P) Promoted; (R) Relegated

NPL WA/State League 1 Relegation/Promotion Playoff

Semi-finals
NPL 11	Perth Glory Youth	1	5	6
SL1 4	Mandurah City	3	0	3
SL1 2	Dianella White Eagles	2	3	5
SL1 3	Murdoch University Melville	0	1	1

Final
Perth Glory Youth	11
Dianella White Eagles	0

=== 2024 WA State League 2 ===
Pos	Team	Pld	W	D	L	GF	GA	GD	Pts	Qualification or relegation
1	Kalamunda City (C, P)	22	14	6	2	55	26	+29	48	Promotion to 2025 State League 1
2	East Perth FC	22	15	2	5	59	29	+30	47	Promotion/relegation play-offs
3	Joondalup City (P)	22	13	4	5	54	26	+28	43	Promotion/relegation play-offs
4	Curtin University FC (P)	22	13	1	8	48	40	+8	40	Promotion/relegation play-offs
5	Forrestfield United	22	10	1	11	33	44	−11	31	
6	Balga SC	22	9	3	10	31	31	0	30	
7	Ashfield SC	22	8	3	11	45	49	−4	27	
8	Quinns FC	22	8	3	11	34	43	−9	27	
9	Canning City	22	7	3	12	37	50	−13	24	
10	Carramar Shamrock Rovers	22	6	4	12	24	40	−16	22	
11	Swan United (O)	22	7	1	14	29	46	−17	22	Promotion/relegation play-offs
12	Wanneroo City	22	5	3	14	22	47	−25	18	Staying in 2025 State League 2 (Note: On 11 October 2024, Football West confirmed that after expressions of interests from different Amateur Premier Division teams, Wanneroo City would be chosen as the team to take the vacant spot in the State League 2.)

Rules for classification: 1) points; 2) goal difference; 3) number of goals scored.
(C) Champions; (O) Play-off winners; (P) Promoted

State League 1/State League 2 Relegation/Promotion Playoff

Semi-finals
SL1 11	Cockburn City	0	2	2
SL2 4	Curtin University FC	2	2	4
SL1 2	Joondalup City	3	2	5
SL1 3	East Perth FC	1	1	2

Final
Joondalup City	1
Curtin University FC	0

State League 2/Amateur Premier Division Relegation/Promotion Playoff

Final
SL2 11	Swan United	3
AM 2	Emerald FC	2

== 2024 State Cup ==
Western Australian soccer clubs competed in the Football West State Cup competition, which initially involved teams from the Amateur League and Metropolitan League competitions, and from regional teams from the South West and Great Southern regions. In the third round, teams from the two divisions of the State League entered, and in the fourth round teams from the National Premier Leagues WA entered.

The competition also served as the Western Australian Preliminary rounds for the 2024 Australia Cup. The two finalists – Olympic Kingsway and Perth RedStar – qualified for the final rounds, entering at the Round of 32.

The final was played on 7 September, and won in extra-time by Olympic Kingsway 3–2, their first title.

== 2024 NPL Women ==
The 2024 NPL WA Women was the fifth season in the National Premier Leagues WA Women format. It was played over 21 rounds as a triple round-robin, followed by an end of season Top 4 Cup competition.

Pos	Team	Pld	W	D	L	GF	GA	GD	Pts	Qualification or relegation
1	Perth RedStar (C)	22	19	1	2	97	24	+73	58	NPLWA-W Top Four Cup
2	Perth SC	21	16	1	4	78	24	+54	49	NPLWA-W Top Four Cup
3	Balcatta	22	14	2	6	64	34	+30	44	NPLWA-W Top Four Cup
4	Fremantle City	21	10	3	8	54	36	+18	33	NPLWA-W Top Four Cup
5	Football West NTC U-19	21	8	0	13	35	64	−29	24	
6	Subiaco AFC	21	5	4	12	31	68	−37	19	
7	Murdoch University Melville	21	3	3	15	21	72	−51	12	
8	UWA Nedlands	21	2	2	17	23	81	−58	8	

Source: Squadi
Rules for classification: 1) points; 2) goal difference; 3) number of goals scored.
(C) Champions

=== Top four cup ===
Semi-finals
1	Perth RedStar	0 (2)
2	Perth SC (p)	0 (3)
3	Balcatta (p)	1 (3)
4	Fremantle City	1 (1)

Preliminary Final
Perth RedStar	3
Balcatta	2

Grand Final
Perth SC	0
Perth RedStar	1
