= Leigh Griffiths =

Scottish footballer (born 1990)

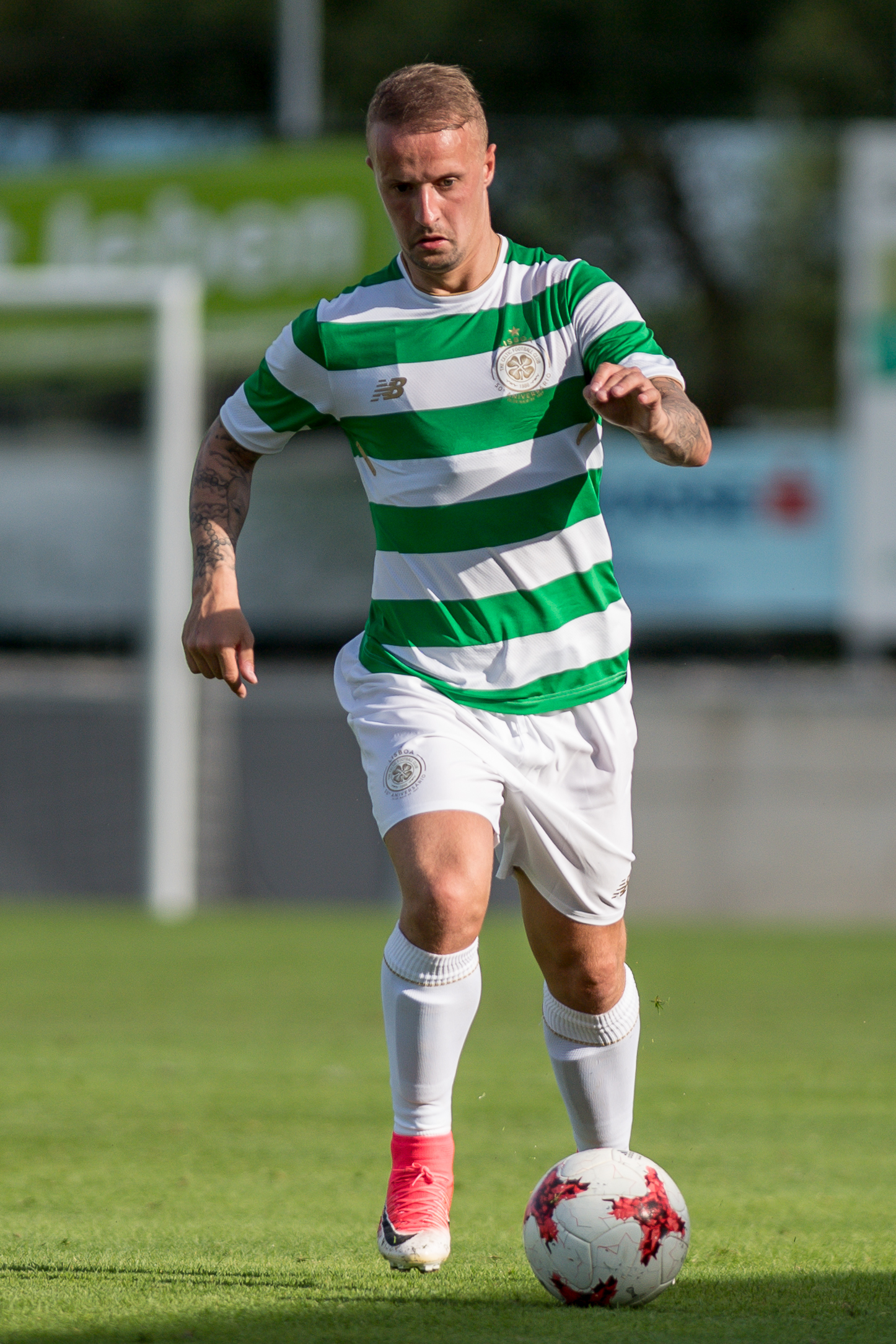
- Griffiths playing for Celtic in 2017

Personal information
- Full name: Leigh Griffiths
- Date of birth: 20 August 1990 (age 36)
- Place of birth: Edinburgh, Scotland
- Height: 5 ft 9 in (1.75 m)
- Position: Striker

Team information
- Current team: Armadale

Youth career
- 1997–2002: Leith Athletic
- 2002–2003: Falkirk
- 2003–2004: Inch Colts
- 2004–2006: Hutchison Vale
- 2006–2007: Livingston

Senior career*
Years	Team	Apps	(Gls)
2006–2009	Livingston	48	(22)
2009–2011	Dundee	47	(21)
2011–2014	Wolverhampton Wanderers	26	(12)
2011–2013	→ Hibernian (loan)	66	(31)
2014–2022	Celtic	173	(90)
2021–2022	→ Dundee (loan)	15	(2)
2022	Falkirk	12	(2)
2022–2024	Mandurah City	35	(20)
2025–2026	Stirling Macedonia	19	(5)
2026–	Armadale	22	(11)

International career^{‡}
2008–2009	Scotland U19	6	(1)
2008–2012	Scotland U21	11	(3)
2009	Scotland B	1	(1)
2012–2020	Scotland	22	(4)
- * Club domestic league appearances and goals as of 15 Sep 2026 ‡ National team caps and goals as of 22:09, 18 November 2020 (UTC)

Leigh Griffiths (born 20 August 1990) is a Scottish professional footballer who plays as a striker for National Premier Leagues Western Australia club Armadale.

Griffiths started his career at Livingston where he made his debut as a sixteen-year-old. He then moved to Dundee in 2009 for £125,000. During his five years in the Scottish First Division he earned six young player of the month awards. With Dundee in financial trouble, Griffiths moved to Wolves for around £150,000 in January 2011.

Having not been a Wolves first team regular, he spent the 2011–12 season on loan to Scottish Premier League club Hibernian. This loan was renewed for the following season, during which he won the SFWA Footballer of the Year award and made his debut appearance for Scotland. After it appeared Griffiths had become part of Wolves' plans during the 2013–14 season he moved mid-season to join Celtic.

Griffiths scored regularly during his first few seasons with Celtic and then played regularly for Scotland, scoring twice in a 2–2 draw with England in June 2017. After failing to impress for Celtic in later years, Griffiths spent the first half of the 2021–22 season on loan with Dundee. He was recalled by Celtic and released at the end of the January 2022 transfer window, after which he signed for Scottish League One club Falkirk. On 9 August 2022, he signed for Western Australian outfit Mandurah City.

== Early life ==
Griffiths was born in Edinburgh, Scotland, and grew up in Leith, where he attended Portobello High for two years, before switching to Leith Academy.

== Club career ==
=== Livingston ===
Griffiths made his debut for Livingston as a sixteen-year-old, after coming on as an 82nd minute substitute during a 3–1 defeat to Airdrie United on 30 December 2006. His teammates in his breakthrough period at Almondvale Stadium included fellow youth graduates and future Scotland colleagues Robert Snodgrass and Graham Dorrans. Griffiths won the SFL under-19 League in 2007–08 with the youth team. In March 2009, Griffiths alongside then Livingston teammates Andy Halliday and Joe McKee spent five days on trial with Italian Serie B side Parma. He also trained with Premier League team West Bromwich Albion in April 2009 and impressed enough to warrant a move, but manager Tony Mowbray departed soon afterwards and the club moved onto other targets.

=== Dundee ===
On 25 June 2009, Griffiths completed a £125,000 move to Scottish First Division rivals Dundee, despite having an offer rejected for the player back in April. He scored three goals on Dundee's run in the 2009–10 Scottish Challenge Cup, and played in their 3–2 win over Inverness in the final. Livingston claimed in January 2011 that they had yet to receive payment, which was denied by Dundee. Griffiths became a fans favourite during his spell at Dundee and scored 34 goals in 62 appearances, which included a memorable 30-yard free kick in the Scottish League Cup against Rangers.

=== Wolverhampton Wanderers ===
On 27 January 2011, Griffiths signed for English Premier League side Wolverhampton Wanderers on a two-and-a-half-year contract after he successfully completed a two-week trial. The transfer fee paid to Dundee was estimated at £150,000. He was an unused substitute against Tottenham in March 2011, but did not feature again in part of any matchday squads during the club's remaining fixtures that season. His Wolves debut came on 23 August 2011, when he came on as a substitute in a League Cup tie at Northampton Town, in what was to be his only game for the club during the 2011–12 and 2012–13 seasons.

In both these seasons, Wolves instead loaned him out to Hibernian, where he enjoyed considerable success (see below). Following his performances with Hibs, Wolves opted to take up their option of a contract extension that would ensure Griffiths remained under contract for the 2013–14 season. Hibernian subsequently made an offer to acquire him in a permanent deal, but it was rejected by Wolves, who also stated that they had "no intention of selling the player on to any other club". New Wolves manager Kenny Jackett affirmed that Griffiths was part of his plans for their campaign in League One, and he made his league debut for the club on 3 August 2013 against Preston, some two and a half years since first signing. He scored his first goals for the club a week later when he scored twice against Gillingham, having agreed a new long-term contract.

By January 2014 Griffiths was Wolves' leading goalscorer for the season with thirteen goals, attracting bids from Celtic. After Wolves rejected initial offers from the Scottish champions, they accepted a bid on 31 January, reported to be £1 million.

==== Hibernian (loan) ====
Griffiths moved on a 6-month loan in August 2011 to Scottish Premier League club Hibernian. Three days before his loan was due to end, it was extended to the end of the season. He was criticised by the Hibs manager, Pat Fenlon, after he was suspended for a second time for gesturing at supporters. Later that month, he was suspended again for the same offence. In March 2012, newspaper reports claimed that he had assaulted Fenlon and his assistant, but these reports were denied by the club. He scored a late winning goal in the 2–1 win in the Scottish Cup semi-final against Aberdeen. Overall, Griffiths scored 11 goals in 36 appearances for Hibs during the 2011–12 season.

Hibs agreed another loan deal with Wolves for Griffiths in July 2012, due to run until at least January 2013. He scored three goals early in the 2012–13 season, including two in one match against St Mirren. He won the SPL Player of the Month award for August 2012, then scored both goals in a 2–1 win against Kilmarnock in his next appearance. Two goals in another match against St Mirren on 3 November increased his tally to eleven for the season. This run of form earned him a first Scotland cap, in a friendly against Luxembourg. His form dipped after this, however, as he scored two goals in the next thirteen matches.

In January 2013, Griffiths trained with his parent club Wolves to allow new manager Dean Saunders to assess him. Wolves then issued a statement criticising him for making an offensive comment on Twitter. PFA Scotland said that although they could not comment about individual cases that were ongoing, they condemned all "discriminatory behaviour" and urged their members to be aware of the dangers of misusing social media. Campaign group Show Racism the Red Card said that they were "saddened" by the comments and acknowledged the apology made by him to the individual affected and the general public.

Wolves said in their statement about the offensive comment that Griffiths was likely to remain at Hibs for the rest of the 2012–13 season, and this was confirmed on 16 January. He scored in every SPL match during February to win a second SPL player of the month award. On 3 March 2013, he scored his first ever professional hat-trick in a Scottish Cup tie against Kilmarnock. A week later during an Edinburgh derby, he appeared to have scored a free-kick goal after the ball rebounded off the crossbar and dropped behind the goal-line, before bouncing back into play. Television replays showed that the ball had crossed the line by a few feet, but referee Euan Norris did not give a goal and the match finished goalless. In the Scottish Cup semi-final on 13 April 2013, he scored in extra time to seal a come-from-behind 4–3 victory over Falkirk.

Having scored 25 goals in all competitions by mid-April, Griffiths was nominated for Player of the Year and Young Player of the Year by PFA Scotland, winning the latter award. He was also included in the SPL Team of the Year and named player of the year in the Scottish Premier League Yearly Awards.

On 17 May, he was named the SFWA Footballer of the Year, becoming the first Hibs player to win that award since Pat Stanton in 1970.

=== Celtic ===
Griffiths signed a four-year deal with Scottish champions Celtic for an undisclosed fee on 31 January 2014.

==== 2013–14 season ====
Griffiths made his debut for Celtic as a substitute in the 2–1 loss in the 2013–14 Scottish Cup fifth round against Aberdeen. On 22 February 2014, he scored his first goal for Celtic against Hearts. On 1 March 2014, he scored a hat-trick against Inverness in a 5–0 home win. He formed a good understanding with fellow striker Anthony Stokes, who had up until Griffiths' arrival at Celtic in January struggled for form that season. Near the end of the season, the pair turned in an outstanding performance in a 6–0 rout of Inverness at Celtic Park on 27 April. Griffiths provided assists for Stokes' first two goals in the first half (the Irish striker went on to complete a hat trick), before Griffiths scored himself in the second half, latching on to pass from Stokes and shooting in to the far corner of the net. Griffiths finished the season with 7 goals from 14 appearances for Celtic.

The SFA issued Griffiths with a notice of a complaint in April after he was filmed singing about the financial state of Hearts at an Edinburgh derby match. He apologised to Hearts and was disciplined by Celtic. Video footage of him chanting in an Edinburgh pub that former Hearts player Rudi Skácel was a "refugee" was then made public, which led to investigations by Celtic, the SFA and Police Scotland. Celtic manager Neil Lennon said that the club would do what they could to help him.

He was charged and cautioned with an offence, related to an incident in the Edinburgh pub, under the Offensive Behaviour at Football and Threatening Communications Act in January 2015. He admitted the offence during a court appearance in September 2015, for which he was admonished. Celtic had previously fined him four weeks' wages.

==== 2014–15 season ====
Griffiths was used mainly as a substitute by new Celtic manager Ronny Deila in the first couple of months of the following season. He didn't play at all for the first team during September, and was linked with a loan move to former club Hibernian. Manager Ronny Deila stated that Griffiths needed to improve his fitness, stressing the importance of being a "24-hour athlete".

Griffiths returned to first-team action in October, again coming on in games as a substitute. He scored twice in a 6–0 win over Partick Thistle in the quarter-final of the League Cup. He began starting games more often after the New Year, and on 1 February 2015 he opened the scoring in a 2–0 win over Rangers in the Scottish League Cup semi-final which was the first Old Firm meeting since April 2012; he was booked for his goal celebration. He went on to score six goals in his next ten games for Celtic.

On 15 March, he started in the League Cup Final, making way for John Guidetti after 69 minutes of an eventual 2–0 win over Dundee United. Griffiths netted a hat-trick on 15 April after coming on in the second half of a 4–1 win in the league over Kilmarnock. Deila described his performance as "fabulous", praising both his goalscoring and his overall contribution to the team. Deila also mentioned the improvement he had made to his fitness. Eleven days later he scored another treble, all of the goals in a 3–0 victory over Dundee United at Tannadice. Having clinched the league championship, Celtic defeated Inverness 5–0 in their final game of the season on 24 May, with Griffiths coming on as a substitute in the second half to score Celtic's fourth goal of the game and his 20th of the season.

==== 2015–16 season ====
At the beginning of the 2015–16 season, Griffiths took the number 9 shirt at Celtic.

On 19 August 2015, he scored a brace against Swedish side Malmö FF in a 3–2 win at Celtic Park in the first leg of the Champions League playoffs.

Celtic failed to qualify for the Champions League, dropping down into the Europa League, but he continued to score regularly. By early October he had scored 10 goals in 18 domestic and European matches. He signed a new contract with Celtic on 18 December, extending his commitment with the club to 2021. He commented on Celtic: "I don't see why I really need to leave this club. This is a bigger club than three quarters of the English Premier League." He also acknowledged his own growing maturity in recent years, "If you look at me beforehand, still doing daft stuff off the field and I've kind of quietened down a bit now and I had to because I was almost staring the exit door in the face."

On 15 January 2016, Griffiths scored his 50th goal for Celtic, opening the scoring in their 4–1 win over Dundee United at Tannadice; he became the fastest Celtic player to achieve this landmark since Charlie Nicholas in the 1980s, reaching the tally in fewer games than the likes of Henrik Larsson and John Hartson. He finished the season with 40 goals in all competitions for Celtic, making him the first player to do so since Larsson in the 2003–04 season.

Griffiths was a key player in Celtic's fifth successive league title success, scoring 31 goals in the league. His form over the course of the season saw him win the PFA Scotland, Scottish Football Writers' and Scottish Premiership Player of the Year awards.

==== 2016–17 season ====
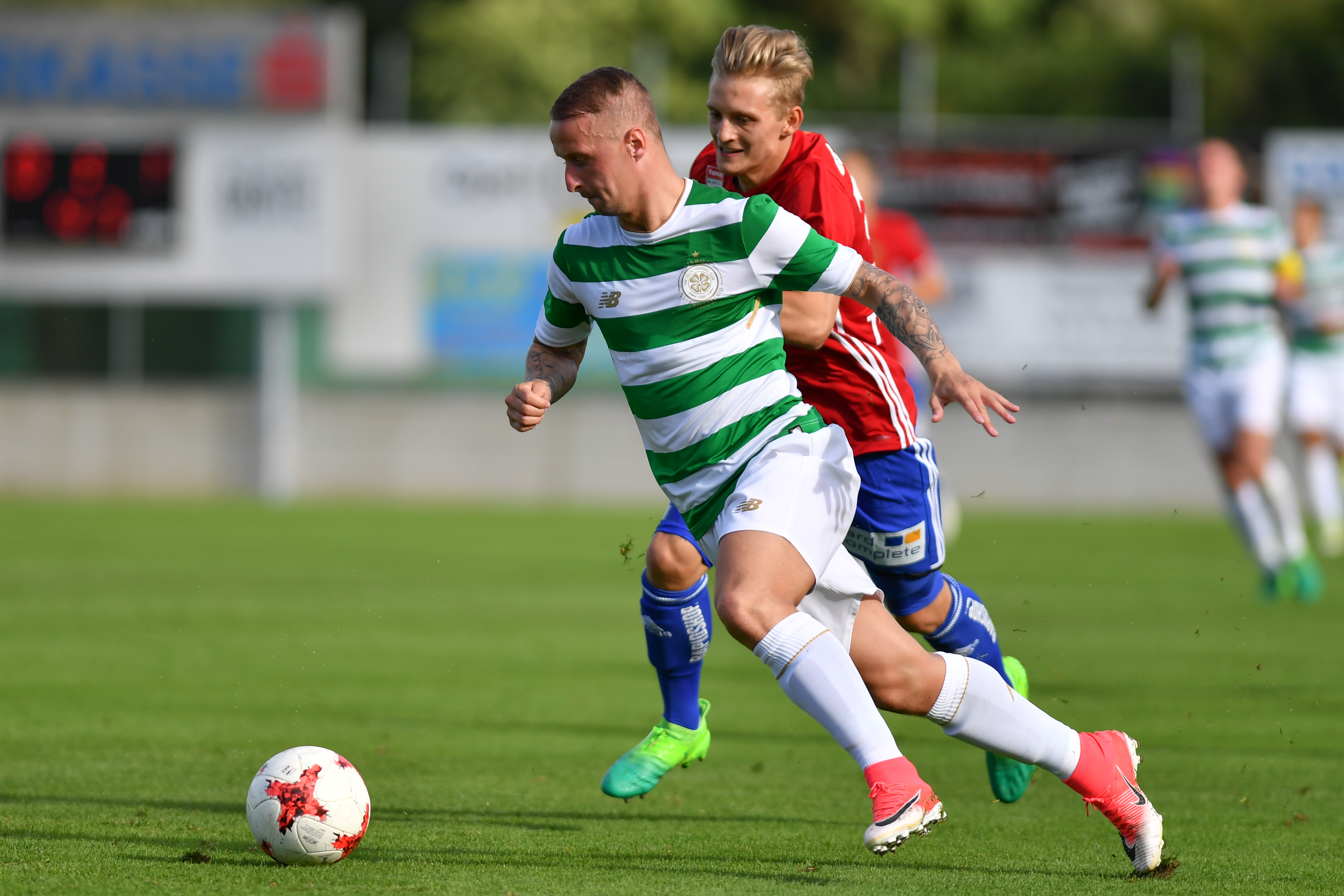
Griffiths playing for Celtic in 2017

Griffiths opened his account for the 2016–17 season in the second leg of Celtic's Champions League second qualifying round match against Lincoln Red Imps, scoring the second goal in Celtic's 3–0 win. He also scored twice in a 5–2 win against Hapoel Beer Sheva. After returning from an injury, Griffiths found it hard to break back into the team due to the form of Moussa Dembélé.

Following Dembélé's injury in the Scottish Cup semi-final against rivals Rangers, Griffiths found his way back into the first team, and helped Celtic to complete the league season undefeated and win the Treble.

==== 2017–18 season ====
In Celtic's first match of the 2017–18 season, a qualifier for the UEFA Champions League against Linfield in Belfast, Griffiths was cautioned for time-wasting after he picked up a glass Buckfast bottle which had been thrown at him from the crowd and showed it to the referee. The incident was one of several instances of missile-throwing in a fixture which was always expected to be problematic due to the attitudes of many of the supporters of both clubs, and its taking place in the same week as the biggest annual Unionist celebrations in Northern Ireland which heighten local tensions. At the conclusion of the match (which his team won), Griffiths responded to the hostility by tying a Celtic scarf to the goalposts. In the aftermath, UEFA not only upheld the booking but also declared their intention to further discipline Griffiths for his scarf gesture, which they deemed to be provocative towards the home fans.

On 23 September 2017, Griffiths scored in a 2–0 win against Celtic's Glasgow rivals Rangers. He celebrated his goal with a scarf thrown into the pitch by Celtic fans and made headlines for allegedly wiping contents of his nose on the Ibrox corner flag.

==== 2018–2022 ====
On 30 August 2018, Griffiths scored his 100th goal for Celtic when he netted the opener against FK Sūduva, making him the first player to do so since John Hartson thirteen years earlier. In September, Griffiths signed a new contract with Celtic that was due to run until 2022. Celtic manager Brendan Rodgers said in December that Griffiths would not be involved for a "little period of time", as he needed to resolve issues in his personal life.

Griffiths played infrequently for Celtic over the next two seasons, making only nine starts during 2020–21. His contract with Celtic expired on 30 June 2021, leading to speculation about his future, but he signed a one-year contract with the club on 1 July 2021. Later in July, Griffiths was sent home from Celtic's pre-season training camp after it became public that Police Scotland were investigating allegations that Griffiths had sent improper online messages to an underage girl. A week later the police said that their assessment had established there was no criminality in the messages. Some Celtic fans booed Griffiths in his next appearance at Celtic Park, during a friendly match with West Ham United on 24 July. Celtic manager Ange Postecoglou said afterwards it was up to Griffiths to win their approval with his on-field performance.

==== Dundee (loan) ====
On 31 August 2021, Griffiths re-joined Dundee on a season-long loan. Griffiths made his second debut for Dundee in a 0–0 with Livingston on 11 September. During a League Cup match on 22 September, Griffiths appeared to kick a smoke bomb into a section of St Johnstone fans. Two days later he was charged with culpable and reckless conduct in relation to that incident. After recovering from a slight injury, Griffiths returned and scored his first goal for the Dee in over a decade in a home win against Aberdeen. Celtic activated a clause in Griffiths' contract to terminate it on 31 January 2022, which also ended his loan spell at Dundee. Griffiths rejected an offer to sign for Dundee permanently.

=== Falkirk ===
On 8 February 2022, Griffiths signed for Falkirk for the rest of the 2021–22 season. He left the club at the end of the season.

=== Mandurah City ===
Griffiths moved to Australia in August 2022 and signed for third-tier club Mandurah City on a short-term deal. Griffiths scored on his debut for the Dolphins in a league win over Western Knights.

By October 2022 Griffiths had returned to Scotland, where he was offered the use of training facilities at Livingston.

Griffiths returned to Australia to re-sign for Mandurah City in March 2023 until the end of the season. In November, the club announced that Griffiths would serve as a player-coach for the 2024 season.

=== Stirling Macedonia ===
In late June 2025, Griffiths join Stirling Macedonia for NPL WA Season and Australia Cup. On 30 August 2025, Griffiths won the Football West State Cup with the Lions against rivals Olympic Kingsway.

== International career ==
Griffiths was selected for the Scotland B side that played Northern Ireland B. at the end of the 2008–09 season. He set up George Boyd for the second goal, who then set up Griffiths to net the last goal in a 3–0 win. He was a regular for the Scotland under-19 team, and was then selected to play for the Scotland under-21 team. His first goal for Scotland U21 was on his second call up on 2 March 2010, when he equalised against Azerbaijan.

Despite playing regularly in the 2011–12 Scottish Premier League for Hibernian, Griffiths was left out of some Scotland U21 squads. He was recalled for qualification games against Luxembourg (in which he scored) and Austria in September 2012.

Griffiths was added to the full Scotland squad in November 2012 for a friendly match against Luxembourg. His second cap for Scotland came against Croatia in a 1–0 away victory in a 2014 FIFA World Cup qualifier.

On 10 June 2017, Griffiths scored his first goal for Scotland with an 87th-minute free kick against England, before netting another one just three minutes later to put the Scots 2–1 ahead. The match ended 2–2 with Harry Kane netting England's leveller. Griffiths scored further goals against Malta and Slovenia during 2018 World Cup qualifying.

Problems with fitness and in his personal life meant that Griffiths did not play for Scotland during 2019. He was recalled to the squad in November 2020, and was part of the squad which won the play-off qualifier which put Scotland through to Euro 2020. However, he was not selected in Steve Clarke's 26-man squad for the finals, announced in May 2021.

== Career statistics ==
=== Club ===
As of 14 September 2024

Appearances and goals by club, season and competition
Club	Season	League			National Cup		League Cup		Europe		Other		Total	
Club	Season	Division	Apps	Goals	Apps	Goals	Apps	Goals	Apps	Goals	Apps	Goals	Apps	Goals
Livingston	2006–07	Scottish First Division	4	1	0	0	0	0	0	0	0	0	4	1
Livingston	2007–08	Scottish First Division	17	4	2	0	1	0	0	0	0	0	20	4
Livingston	2008–09	Scottish First Division	27	17	0	0	2	1	0	0	2 (Note: Appearances in the Scottish Challenge Cup)	3	31	21
Livingston	Total		48	22	2	0	3	1	0	0	2	3	55	26
Dundee	2009–10	Scottish First Division	29	13	3	1	4	4	0	0	3	3	39	21
Dundee	2010–11	Scottish First Division	18	8	1	0	2	3	0	0	2	1	23	12
Dundee	Total		47	21	4	1	6	7	0	0	5	4	62	33
Wolves	2010–11	Premier League	0	0	0	0	0	0	0	0	0	0	0	0
Wolves	2011–12	Premier League	0	0	0	0	1	0	0	0	0	0	1	0
Wolves	2012–13	Championship	0	0	0	0	0	0	0	0	0	0	0	0
Wolves	2013–14	League One	26	12	2	1	1	0	0	0	1 (Note: Appearance in the Football League Trophy)	0	30	13
Wolves	Total		26	12	2	1	2	0	0	0	1	0	31	13
Hibernian (loan)	2011–12	Scottish Premier League	30	8	4	3	2	0	0	0	0	0	36	11
Hibernian (loan)	2012–13	Scottish Premier League	36	23	5	5	1	0	0	0	0	0	42	28
Hibernian (loan)	Total		66	31	9	8	3	0	0	0	0	0	78	39
Celtic	2013–14	Scottish Premiership	13	7	1	0	0	0	0	0	0	0	14	7
Celtic	2014–15	Scottish Premiership	24	14	5	3	3	3	9	0	0	0	41	20
Celtic	2015–16	Scottish Premiership	34	31	4	4	2	1	11	4	0	0	51	40
Celtic	2016–17	Scottish Premiership	24	12	3	1	2	0	9	5	0	0	38	18
Celtic	2017–18	Scottish Premiership	25	9	1	0	4	2	9	2	0	0	39	13
Celtic	2018–19	Scottish Premiership	11	2	0	0	2	2	7	2	0	0	20	6
Celtic	2019–20	Scottish Premiership	21	9	4	2	1	0	7	1	0	0	33	12
Celtic	2020–21	Scottish Premiership	22	6	2	0	0	0	2	1	0	0	26	7
Celtic	Total		173	90	20	10	14	8	54	15	0	0	261	123
Dundee (loan)	2021–22	Scottish Premiership	15	2	1	1	1	0	—		—		17	3
Falkirk	2021–22	Scottish League One	12	2	—		—		—		—		12	2
Mandurah City	2022	Football West State League Division 1	2	2	0	0	0	0	0	0	0	0	2	2
Mandurah City	2023	Football West State League Division 1	13	9	0	0	0	0	0	0	3 (Note: One appearance in the State League Night Series and two appearances in the NPL West promotion/relegation play-offs)	1	16	10
Mandurah City	2024	Football West State League Division 1	20	9	2	0	0	0	0	0	6 (Note: Appearances in the State League Night Series and the Inter Divisional Play-offs)	6	28	15
Mandurah City	Total		35	20	2	0	0	0	0	0	9	7	46	27
Career total			422	200	40	21	29	16	54	15	16	14	562	266

=== International ===
As of 22:09, 18 November 2020 (UTC)

Appearances and goals by national team and year
National team	Year	Apps	Goals
Scotland	2012	1	0
Scotland	2013	3	0
Scotland	2015	2	0
Scotland	2016	4	0
Scotland	2017	7	4
Scotland	2018	2	0
Scotland	2020	3	0
Total		22	4

Scores and results list Scotland's goal tally first, score column indicates score after each Griffiths goal.

List of international goals scored by Leigh Griffiths
No.	Date	Venue	Opponent	Score	Result	Competition
1	10 June 2017	Hampden Park, Glasgow, Scotland	England	1–1	2–2	2018 FIFA World Cup qualification
2	10 June 2017	Hampden Park, Glasgow, Scotland	England	2–1	2–2	2018 FIFA World Cup qualification
3	4 September 2017	Hampden Park, Glasgow, Scotland	Malta	2–0	2–0	2018 FIFA World Cup qualification
4	8 October 2017	Stožice Stadium, Ljubljana, Slovenia	Slovenia	1–0	2–2	2018 FIFA World Cup qualification

== Honours ==
Livingston Youth

- SFL under-19 League: 2007–08

Dundee

- Scottish Challenge Cup: 2009–10

Wolverhampton Wanderers

- Football League One: 2013–14

Celtic

- Scottish Premiership: 2013–14, 2014–15, 2015–16, 2016–17, 2017–18, 2018–19, 2019–20
- Scottish Cup: 2016–17, 2017–18, 2019–20
- Scottish League Cup: 2014–15, 2016–17, 2017–18, 2018–19

Mandurah City

- Football West State League Division 1 Top Four Cup: 2022, 2023

Stirling Macedonia

- Football West State Cup: 2025

Individual

- PFA Scotland Players' Player of the Year: 2015–16
- Celtic Player of The Year: 2015–16
- SFWA Footballer of the Year: 2012–13, 2015–16
- SPL Player of the Year: 2012–13
- Scottish Premiership Player of the Year: 2015–16
- Scottish Football Supporters Association (SFSA) Player of the Year: 2016
- SPFA Young Player of the Year: 2012–13
- SFL Young Player of the Year: 2008–09, 2009–10
- SFL Young Player of the Month: March 2008, August 2008, March 2009, September 2009, October 2009, November 2010
- SPL Player of the Month: August 2012, February 2013
- SPFL Player of the Month: April 2015
- Scottish Premiership Player of the Month: August 2015, October 2015
- SFWA International Player of the Year: 2017–18
