= Football West Amateur League Premier Division =

- Country: Australia
- Number of clubs: 12
- Level on pyramid: 5
- Promotion to: State League Division 2
- Relegation to: Amateur League Division 1
- Current champions: North Perth United (2020)
- Website: Football West

The Football West Amateur League Premier Division is a regional Australian association football league comprising teams from Western Australia. The league sits at Level 4 on the Western Australian league system (Level 5 of the overall Australian league system). The competition is administered by Football West, the governing body of the sport in the state.

== Format ==
The league operates with a promotion and relegation system, with relegation to the Amateur League Division 1, and potential for promotion to the State League Division 2 for the top team each year.

In 2020, promotion and relegation was suspended for the season, due to the impacts on the competition from the COVID-19 pandemic in Australia.

== Clubs ==
The following 12 clubs competed in the 2020 Season:

Club
Hamersley Rovers
Jaguar FC
Joondalup United (Amateurs)
Kwinana United SC
Leeming Strikers
Maddington White City
North Perth United
Queens Park
Quinns FC (Amateurs)
South West Phoenix
UWA-Nedlands (Amateurs)
Wembley Downs SC

== Honours ==
Year	Premiers
1968	Queen's Park
1969	Graylands Hostel
1970	Gosnells
1971	Gosnells ^{U}
1972	Lathlain Meazza
1973	Neerlandia
1974	Belmont-Cloverdale ^{U}
1975	Windsor Athletic
1976	WA Maccabi
1977	Whitford United
1978	Whitford United
1979	Windsor Athletic
1980	Windsor Athletic
1981	Kwinana
1982	Ferndale United
1983	Gosnells Amateurs
1984	Gosnells Amateurs
1985	Gosnells Amateurs ^{U}
1986	Rochester
1987	Gosnells Amateurs
1988	Fremantle United
1989	Fremantle United ^{U}
1990	Canning City
1991	Fremantle United
1992	Fremantle United
1993	Gosnells Ferndale

Year	Premiers	Ref.
1994	Fremantle United	
1995	Mandurah City	
1996	Shamrock Rovers	
1997	Shamrock Rovers	
1998	Fremantle United	
1999	Murdoch University	
2000	Fremantle United	
2001	Hamersley Rovers	
2002	Hamersley Rovers	
2003	Hamersley Rovers	
2004	Shamrock Rovers	
2005	Colo Colo	
2006	Spearwood Dalmatinac	
2007	Shamrock Rovers	
2008	Fremantle United	
2009	Stirling Panthers	
2010	Shamrock Rovers	
2011	Southern Spirit FC	
2012	Joondalup United	
2013	North Perth United	
2014	North Perth United	
2015	Gwelup Croatia	
2016	Gwelup Croatia	
2017	Wembley Downs	
2018	North Perth United	
2019	Kingsley SC	
2020	North Perth United	
2021	South West Phoenix	
2022	Maddington White City	
2023	Emerald FC	
2024	Wembley Downs	

Notes

- Ref: :Kreider
- ^{U} undefeated league season
