= 2021 National Premier Leagues =

National Premier Leagues
- Season: 2021
- Champions: No Champions (Finals Series cancelled)

The 2021 National Premier Leagues was the ninth season of the Australian National Premier Leagues soccer competition. The league competition was played by eight separate state and territory member federations. The divisions are ACT, NSW, Northern NSW, Queensland, South Australia, Tasmania, Victoria and Western Australia.

The season was disrupted for most federations due to the impacts from the COVID-19 pandemic in Australia.

== League tables ==
=== ACT ===
The season was cancelled in September, from government-imposed lockdowns, due to the impacts from the COVID-19 pandemic in Australia. Tigers FC were the NPL1 Premiers (based on a points per match formula rather than aggregate points).

Pos	Team	Pld	W	D	L	GF	GA	GD	Pts	PPG	Qualification or relegation
1	Tigers FC	16	11	3	2	33	17	+16	36	2.25	
2	Canberra Croatia	17	11	0	6	37	22	+15	33	1.94	
3	Gungahlin United	16	7	5	4	33	22	+11	26	1.63	
4	Monaro Panthers	17	7	4	6	28	28	0	25	1.47	
5	Belconnen United	17	6	5	6	21	24	−3	23	1.35	
6	West Canberra Wanderers	17	6	1	10	20	35	−15	19	1.12	
7	Canberra Olympic	17	5	3	9	29	37	−8	18	1.06	
8	Tuggeranong United (R)	17	0	7	10	15	31	−16	7	0.41	Relegation to the 2022 ACT NPL 2

Source: mygameday
Rules for classification: 1) points; 2) goal difference; 3) number of goals scored.
Notes: final season positions decided on points per game.
(R) Relegated

=== NSW ===
The season was cancelled on 12 August, due to on-going lockdowns associated with the COVID-19 pandemic in Australia, with no Premier declared, and with promotion and relegation suspended until the following season.

Pos	Team	Pld	W	D	L	GF	GA	GD	Pts
1	Blacktown City	17	11	3	3	36	17	+19	36
2	Sydney United 58	17	9	5	3	31	17	+14	32
3	Rockdale Ilinden	17	7	6	4	28	22	+6	27
4	Manly United	17	7	6	4	24	23	+1	27
5	Sydney Olympic	17	7	3	7	22	19	+3	24
6	Mt Druitt Town Rangers	17	6	5	6	21	25	−4	23
7	Wollongong Wolves	17	6	4	7	23	33	−10	22
8	APIA Leichhardt Tigers	17	6	3	8	20	21	−1	21
9	Marconi Stallions	17	3	10	4	24	25	−1	19
10	Northbridge Bulls	17	3	7	7	32	31	+1	16
11	Sutherland Sharks	17	3	5	9	19	32	−13	14
12	Sydney FC Youth	17	3	5	9	29	44	−15	14

Source: mygameday
Rules for classification: 1) points; 2) goal difference; 3) number of goals scored.

=== Northern NSW ===
The season was cancelled in September, from government-imposed lockdowns, due to the impacts from the COVID-19 pandemic in Australia. Lambton Jaffas were the NPL Premiers (based on a points per match formula rather than aggregate points).

Pos	Team	Pld	W	D	L	GF	GA	GD	Pts	PPG
1	Lambton Jaffas	16	12	2	2	41	15	+26	38	2.38
2	Maitland FC	16	12	1	3	42	20	+22	37	2.31
3	Edgeworth FC	16	11	1	4	36	11	+25	34	2.13
4	Broadmeadow Magic	16	9	4	3	36	16	+20	31	1.94
5	Charlestown Azzurri	16	6	3	7	25	31	−6	21	1.31
6	Weston Workers	16	6	3	7	21	35	−14	21	1.31
7	Newcastle Olympic	16	6	1	9	27	33	−6	19	1.19
8	Lake Macquarie City	16	3	2	11	23	37	−14	11	0.69
9	Adamstown Rosebud	16	2	3	11	19	44	−25	9	0.56
10	Valentine Phoenix	16	1	4	11	9	37	−28	7	0.44

Source: mygameday
Rules for classification: 1) points; 2) goal difference; 3) number of goals scored.

=== Queensland ===
The season was suspended between late July and late August due to the impacts from the COVID-19 pandemic in Australia.

Pos	Team	Pld	W	D	L	GF	GA	GD	Pts	Qualification or relegation
1	Peninsula Power	26	19	3	4	72	25	+47	60	2021 NPL Queensland Finals
2	Brisbane Roar Youth	26	17	4	5	82	31	+51	55	2021 NPL Queensland Finals
3	Olympic FC	26	16	7	3	52	19	+33	55	2021 NPL Queensland Finals
4	Lions FC (C)	26	16	5	5	76	34	+42	53	2021 NPL Queensland Finals
5	Sunshine Coast Wanderers	26	16	3	7	58	42	+16	51	
6	Gold Coast Knights	26	15	1	10	53	40	+13	46	
7	Moreton Bay United	26	14	3	9	75	57	+18	45	
8	Gold Coast United	26	11	4	11	47	39	+8	37	
9	Eastern Suburbs	26	9	5	12	37	58	−21	32	
10	Logan Lightning	26	8	5	13	44	54	−10	29	
11	Capalaba	26	7	3	16	33	70	−37	24	
12	Redlands United (R)	26	5	3	18	32	67	−35	18	Relegation to 2022 FQPL 1
13	Brisbane Strikers (R)	26	2	2	22	21	81	−60	8	Relegation to 2022 FQPL 1
14	Magpies Crusaders United (R)	26	2	2	22	20	85	−65	8	Relegation to 2022 FQPL 1

Source: mygameday
Rules for classification: 1) points; 2) goal difference; 3) number of goals scored.
(C) Champions; (R) Relegated

==== Finals ====
Semi-finals
1	Peninsula Power	0
4	Lions FC	1
2	Brisbane Roar Youth	0
3	Olympic FC	3

Grand Final
Lions FC	3
Olympic FC	1

=== South Australia ===
Pos	Team	Pld	W	D	L	GF	GA	GD	Pts	Qualification or relegation
1	Adelaide Comets	22	12	7	3	40	26	+14	43	2021 NPL SA Finals
2	Adelaide City (C)	22	11	8	3	40	20	+20	41	2021 NPL SA Finals
3	Campbelltown City	22	10	5	7	41	28	+13	35	2021 NPL SA Finals
4	North Eastern MetroStars	22	9	6	7	36	26	+10	33	2021 NPL SA Finals
5	Sturt Lions	22	9	6	7	34	34	0	33	2021 NPL SA Finals
6	South Adelaide Panthers	22	9	5	8	38	36	+2	32	2021 NPL SA Finals
7	Adelaide Olympic	22	6	11	5	37	33	+4	29	
8	Croydon Kings	22	7	8	7	29	30	−1	29	
9	Adelaide United Youth	22	7	4	11	34	45	−11	25	
10	Cumberland United	22	7	4	11	28	45	−17	25	
11	Adelaide Croatia Raiders (R)	22	6	4	12	33	48	−15	22	Relegation to the 2022 SA State League 1
12	Adelaide Blue Eagles (R)	22	3	4	15	27	46	−19	13	Relegation to the 2022 SA State League 1

Source: mygameday
Rules for classification: 1) points; 2) goal difference; 3) number of goals scored.
(C) Champions; (R) Relegated

==== Finals ====
Elimination finals
3	Campbelltown City	1
6	South Adelaide Panthers	3
4	North Eastern MetroStars	0 (3)
5	Sturt Lions (p)	0 (4)

Semifinals
1	Adelaide Comets	0
2	Adelaide City	1
Sturt Lions (p)	2 (6)
South Adelaide Panthers	2 (5)

Preliminary final
Adelaide Comets (a.e.t.)	1
Sturt Lions	0

Grand final
Adelaide City	0 (3)
Adelaide Comets	0 (2)

=== Tasmania ===
Pos	Team	Pld	W	D	L	GF	GA	GD	Pts
1	Glenorchy Knights (C)	21	15	5	1	52	16	+36	50
2	Devonport City	21	15	2	4	54	15	+39	47
3	South Hobart	21	13	4	4	58	24	+34	43
4	Kingborough Lions United	21	11	3	7	42	37	+5	36
5	Launceston City	21	7	1	13	26	48	−22	22
6	Olympia Warriors	21	5	3	13	29	46	−17	18
7	Clarence Zebras	21	5	3	13	33	55	−22	18
8	Riverside Olympic	21	1	3	17	29	82	−53	6

Source: GameDay and RSSSF
Rules for classification: 1) Points; 2) Goal difference; 3) Goals scored
(C) Champions

=== Victoria ===
The season was cancelled on 3 September, due to on-going lockdowns associated with the COVID-19 pandemic in Australia, with no Premier declared, and with promotion and relegation suspended until the following season. However, as a result of a court challenge involving Avondale FC and Football Victoria, it was agreed that eight rounds of games from the 2022 NPL Season would also count towards the 2021 NPL league table, enabling sufficient matches to be played to "complete" the season, and be able to declare a Premier for 2021. Oakleigh Cannons were crowned as Premiers on 26 July 2022.

Pos	Team	Pld	W	D	L	GF	GA	GD	Pts	Qualification or relegation
1	Oakleigh Cannons	26	15	5	6	51	30	+21	50	Declared as 2021 Premiers after additional matches in 2022
2	South Melbourne	26	14	7	5	41	25	+16	49	
3	Avondale	26	14	6	6	54	33	+21	48	
4	Bentleigh Greens	26	13	4	9	43	33	+10	43	
5	Dandenong Thunder	26	12	5	9	43	34	+9	41	
6	Hume City	26	11	5	10	44	34	+10	38	
7	Heidelberg United	26	10	8	8	35	36	−1	38	
8	Melbourne Knights	26	10	6	10	33	36	−3	36	
9	Green Gully	26	9	6	11	34	34	0	33	
10	Port Melbourne	26	14	6	6	46	25	+21	30 (Note: Port Melbourne were retrospectively deducted 18 points for breach of NPL licensing conditions.)	
11	Altona Magic	26	6	10	10	28	38	−10	28	
12	Dandenong City	26	4	7	15	28	49	−21	19	
13	Eastern Lions	26	4	5	17	24	57	−33	17	
14	St Albans Saints	26	3	6	17	15	55	−40	15	

Source: mygameday
Rules for classification: 1) Points; 2) Goal difference; 3) Goals scored

=== Western Australia ===
Pos	Team	Pld	W	D	L	GF	GA	GD	Pts	Qualification or relegation
1	Perth SC (C)	22	14	6	2	37	18	+19	48	2021 NPL WA Finals
2	Floreat Athena	22	13	5	4	48	27	+21	44	2021 NPL WA Finals
3	Sorrento	22	12	6	4	41	27	+14	42	2021 NPL WA Finals
4	Perth Glory Youth	22	10	7	5	42	25	+17	37	2021 NPL WA Finals
5	Inglewood United	22	10	4	8	48	41	+7	34	
6	ECU Joondalup	22	10	2	10	37	34	+3	32	
7	Armadale	22	7	6	9	36	44	−8	27	
8	Bayswater City	22	8	3	11	39	49	−10	27	
9	Cockburn City	22	6	5	11	27	36	−9	23	
10	Gwelup Croatia	22	3	10	9	34	43	−9	19	
11	Balcatta	22	4	7	11	28	44	−16	19	
12	Rockingham City (R)	22	4	1	17	19	48	−29	13	Relegation to the 2022 WA State League 1

Source: mygameday
Rules for classification: 1) points; 2) goal difference; 3) number of goals scored.
(C) Champions; (R) Relegated

==== Finals ====
Semi-finals
1	Perth SC	4
2	Floreat Athena	0
3	Sorrento	1
4	Perth Glory Youth (a.e.t.)	3

Preliminary Final
Floreat Athena	2
Perth Glory Youth	1

Grand Final
Perth SC	6
Floreat Athena	3
