= 2010 WA State League Premier Division =

Football West State Premier Division
- League: (Western Australia) Football West Premier League
- Sport: Association football
- Duration: 2010
- Teams: 12

Football West State League Season
- Champions: Perth
- Premiers: Western Knights

State League Cup 2010
- Cup Winners: Stirling Lions

Football West State League seasons
- ← 2009 2011 →

The 2010 season of the State League Premier Division ran from 20 March to 2 October, featuring 12 clubs.

Western Knights were the Premiers – their fourth title – and Perth were Champions.

== Pre-season changes ==
2009 League	Promoted to league	Relegated from league
Premier League	Balcatta	Canning City

== League table ==
Pos	Team	Pld	W	D	L	GF	GA	GD	Pts	Qualification or relegation
1	Western Knights	22	17	1	4	54	23	+31	52	
2	Stirling Lions	22	13	1	8	41	33	+8	40	
3	Perth SC (C)	22	11	4	7	51	37	+14	37	
4	Floreat Athena	22	10	6	6	35	28	+7	36	
5	ECU Joondalup	22	10	5	7	38	34	+4	35	
6	Sorrento	22	10	3	9	42	38	+4	33	
7	Armadale	22	8	7	7	41	40	+1	31	
8	Balcatta	22	7	5	10	35	41	−6	26	
9	Inglewood United	22	8	2	12	27	42	−15	26	
10	Cockburn City	22	7	3	12	36	46	−10	24	
11	Mandurah City	22	5	4	13	20	33	−13	19	
12	Swan United (R)	22	4	3	15	30	55	−25	15	Relegation to 2011 State League Division 1

Source: Soccerway
Rules for classification: 1) points; 2) goal difference; 3) number of goals scored.
(C) Champions; (R) Relegated

=== Finals ===
Qualifying Finals
2	Stirling Lions	2
3	Perth	3
4	Floreat Athena	3
5	ECU Joondalup SC	2

Semi-finals
1	Western Knights	2
3	Perth	0
2	Stirling Lions	1(9)
4	Floreat Athena	1(8)

Preliminary Final
3	Perth	4
2	Stirling Lions	1

Grand Final
1	Western Knights	1
3	Perth	3
