= 2011 WA State League Premier Division =

All Flags State League Premier Division
- League: (Western Australia) Football West Premier League
- Sport: Association football
- Duration: 2011
- Number of teams: 12

Football West State League Season
- Champions: Perth
- Premiers: Balcatta

State League Cup 2011
- Cup Winners: Sorrento

Football West State League seasons
- ← 2010 2012 →

The 2011 season of the State League Premier Division ran from 26 February to 2 October, featuring 12 clubs.

Balcatta were the Premiers – their first title – and Perth were Champions.

== Pre-season changes ==
2010 League	Promoted to league	Relegated from league
Premier Division	Bayswater City	Swan United

== League table ==
Pos	Team	Pld	W	D	L	GF	GA	GD	Pts	Qualification or relegation
1	Balcatta	22	17	1	4	54	23	+31	52	
2	Perth SC (C)	22	13	1	8	41	33	+8	40	
3	Inglewood United	22	11	4	7	51	37	+14	37	
4	Sorrento	22	10	6	6	35	28	+7	36	
5	Western Knights	22	10	5	7	38	34	+4	35	
6	Stirling Lions	22	10	3	9	42	38	+4	33	
7	Bayswater City	22	8	7	7	41	40	+1	31	
8	Floreat Athena	22	7	5	10	35	41	−6	26	
9	ECU Joondalup	22	8	2	12	27	42	−15	26	
10	Armadale	22	7	3	12	36	46	−10	24	
11	Mandurah City (R)	22	5	4	13	20	33	−13	19	Relegation to 2012 State League Division 1
12	Cockburn City (R)	22	4	3	15	30	55	−25	15	Relegation to 2012 State League Division 1

Source: footballwa.net/past_seasons
Rules for classification: 1) points; 2) goal difference; 3) number of goals scored.
(C) Champions; (R) Relegated

=== Finals ===
Qualifying Finals
2	Perth	4
3	Inglewood United	2
4	Sorrento	3
5	Western Knights	2

Semi-finals
1	Balcatta	1
2	Perth	2
3	Inglewood United	1
4	Sorrento	3

Preliminary Final
1	Balcatta	0
4	Sorrento	3

Grand Final
2	Perth	7
4	Sorrento	0
