= Joondalup (disambiguation) =

Joondalup is a suburb of Perth, Western Australia.

Joondalup may also refer to:

- City of Joondalup, a local government area in Western Australia centred on the suburb of Joondalup
- Yanchep line (known as the Joondalup line prior to 14 July 2024), a suburban railway between Perth and Yanchep, named for the original terminus
- Joondalup railway station, a suburban railway station on the Joondalup line
- Perth RedStar FC, a soccer club, competing in the National Premier Leagues Western Australia, formerly known as ECU Joondalup and Joondalup City
- Joondalup City FC, a soccer club, competing in Football West State League Division 2
- Joondalup United FC, a soccer club, competing in Football West State League Division 1
- Electoral district of Joondalup, an electorate of the Western Australian Legislative Assembly
