= Daniel De Silva =

Australian professional football player

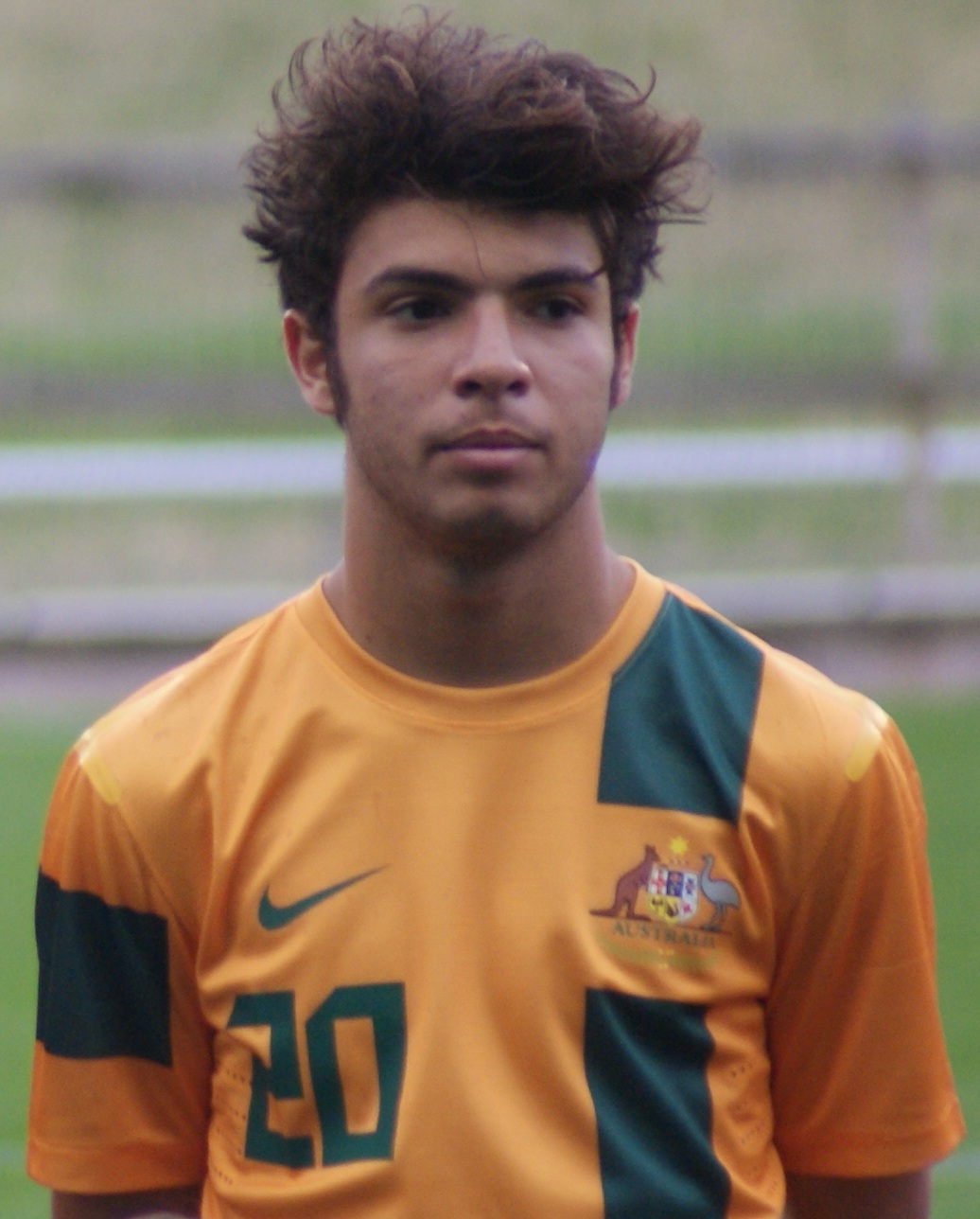
- De Silva with the Australian U20s in 2013

Personal information
- Full name: Daniel Peter De Silva
- Date of birth: 6 March 1997 (age 29)
- Place of birth: Perth, Western Australia
- Height: 1.70 m (5 ft 7 in)
- Position: Attacking midfielder

Team information
- Current team: Olympic Kingsway

Youth career
- 2011: Olympic Kingsway
- 2012: FW NTC
- 2013: Perth Glory

Senior career*
Years	Team	Apps	(Gls)
2013–2017	Perth Glory	32	(3)
2014–2017	Perth Glory NPL	2	(0)
2015–2017	→ Roda JC (loan)	16	(0)
2017–2021	Central Coast Mariners	63	(8)
2018–2019	→ Sydney FC (loan)	19	(2)
2021–2025	Macarthur FC	56	(4)
2026–	Olympic Kingsway	0	(0)

International career^{‡}
2011–2012	Australia U17	7	(2)
2013–2014	Australia U20	15	(2)
2015–2018	Australia U23	11	(0)
- * Club domestic league appearances and goals as of 28 August 2024 ‡ National team caps and goals as of 17 January 2018

Daniel Peter De Silva (born 6 March 1997) is an Australian professional soccer player who currently plays as an attacking midfielder for Olympic Kingsway in the NPL WA.

Born in Perth, De Silva commenced his professional career for Perth Glory in the A-League before joining Roda JC in 2015.

== Club career ==
=== Perth Glory ===
On 22 February 2013, Daniel De Silva signed professional youth contract for Perth Glory. De Silva chose to sign for Perth after a deal with English Premier League side Everton fell through due to complications obtaining a visa. On 2 March 2013, De Silva made his professional debut for Perth Glory aged 15, in the 2–1 home victory against Sydney FC. De Silva came on as a 62nd-minute substitute for Matías Córdoba, making him the second youngest player in A-league history. On 29 October 2014, he scored his first senior goal in the FFA Cup Quarter Final against Melbourne Victory in the first period of extra time.

==== AS Roma ====
On 13 June 2014, Serie A side Roma announced that De Silva would join them at the conclusion of the 2014–15 A-League season for an undisclosed fee, rumoured to be A$2.5m. The transfer was cancelled in August 2015 after Perth Glory did not receive the first installment of the agreed transfer fee.

==== Roda JC ====
On 26 August, Perth Glory announced that De Silva had joined Roda JC on a two-year loan deal.

In January 2017, De Silva's loan was cut short six months early.

=== Central Coast Mariners ===
De Silva joined A-League side Central Coast Mariners in July 2017 on a three-year contract. Daniel De Silva made his first competitive debut for the Mariners in the FFA Cup against Blacktown City, coming on as a substitute in the 86th minute.

=== Sydney FC ===
De Silva spent a year on loan at Sydney FC. He frequently came on as a sub.

=== Macarthur FC ===
De Silva joined new A-League Men side Macarthur FC in July 2021 on a two-year contract. He left Macarthur at the expiry of his contract in June 2023 to pursue overseas opportunities. However, he re-joined Macarthur in July 2023 after a brief period as a free agent, following further discussions with Macarthur coach Mile Sterjovski. Once again, at the conclusion of that season, De Silva left Macarthur at the expiry of his contract, and then after 3 months as a free agent re-joined the club once again. This was the second off-season in a row that De Silva was released by the club to seek other opportunities, only to re-join the club.

Once again, after that season, De Silva was again released.

=== Olympic Kingsway ===
In February 2026, De Silva returned to West Australia, joining National Premier Leagues Western Australia club Olympic Kingsway.

== International career ==
De Silva scored his first goal for the Australia U20s in a man of the match performance against Colombia during the 2013 FIFA U-20 World Cup in a 1–1 draw.

De Silva was also included in Ange Postecoglou's initial 43-man squad for the 2015 AFC Asian Cup.

In November 2025, De Silva represented Australia in the Socca (6-a-side) world cup.

== Personal life ==
De Silva is of Indian descent.

== Career statistics ==
As of 22 January 2024

Appearances and goals by club, season and competition
Club	Season	League			National Cup		Continental		Total	
Club	Season	Division	Apps	Goals	Apps	Goals	Apps	Goals	Apps	Goals
Perth Glory	2012–13	A-League	4	0	0	0	—		4	0
Perth Glory	2013–14	A-League	11	0	0	0	—		11	0
Perth Glory	2014–15	A-League	18	3	3	1	—		21	4
Perth Glory	Total		33	3	3	1	0	0	36	4
Roda JC	2015–16	Eredivisie	8	0	3	0	—		11	0
Roda JC	2016–17	Eredivisie	8	0	1	0	—		9	0
Roda JC	Total		16	0	4	0	0	0	20	0
Central Coast Mariners	2017–18	A-League	21	3	1	0	—		22	3
Central Coast Mariners	2019–20	A-League	20	1	4	0	—		24	1
Central Coast Mariners	2020–21	A-League	22	4	0	0	—		22	4
Central Coast Mariners	Total		63	8	5	0	0	0	68	8
Sydney FC (loan)	2018–19	A-League	19	2	2	1	4	0	25	3
Macarthur	2021–22	A-League Men	14	1	2	0	—		16	1
Macarthur	2022–23	A-League Men	17	1	3	1	—		20	2
Macarthur	2023–24	A-League Men	5	0	0	0	4	1	9	1
Macarthur	Total		36	2	5	1	4	1	45	4
Career total			167	15	19	3	8	1	194	19

== Honours ==
Macarthur

- Australia Cup: 2022
