= Soccer in Western Australia =

Association Football (Soccer) in Western Australia
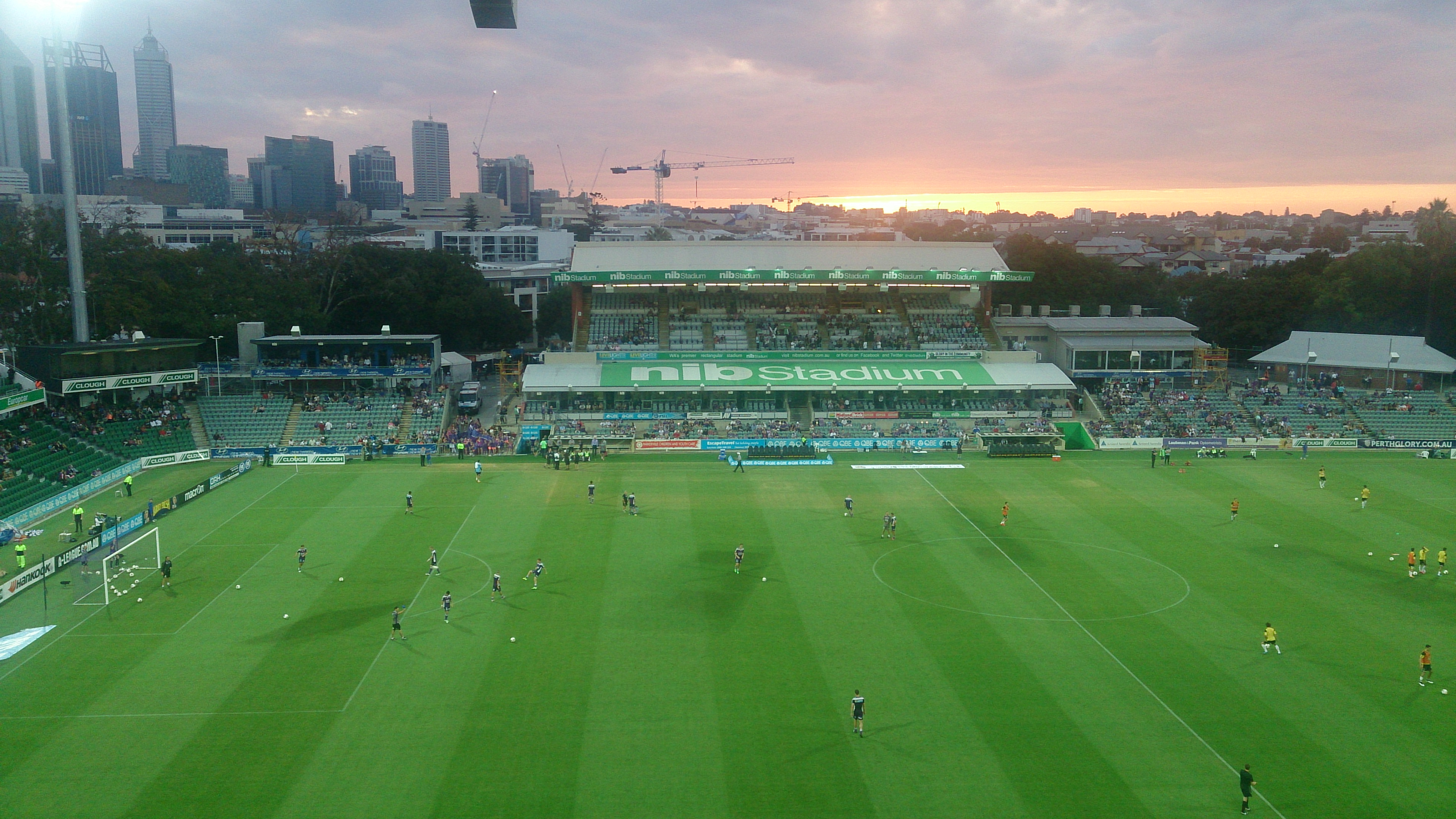
- Perth Glory's home ground NIB Stadium in March 2015
- Governing body: Football West
- First played: 1896, Perth
- Registered players: 117,248 (adult); 61,834 (child)

Audience records
- Single match: 56,371

In Western Australia (WA), soccer is the most participated code of football, though it is a distant second in overall interest behind Australian rules football in Western Australia. It is governed by Football West. Football West runs the National Premier Leagues Western Australia (the states premier competition), State Leagues, Sunday League and Metropolitan League. There are also numerous casual and school competitions, as well as futsal and indoor soccer in competitive and social games.

The sport's origin in Western Australia dates back to the later days of the colony, when in 1896, the first governing body was formed. The state has one professional team, Perth Glory FC which competes in both the A-League Men and A-League Women.

Perth hosted a number of 2023 FIFA Women's World Cup matches.

Notable Western Australian players include Robbie Dunn, Ron Adair, Brad Jones, Richard Garcia, Alistair Edwards, Jamie Harnwell, Robert Zabica, Stan Lazaridis; the Petkovic brothers, Jason and Michael; and the Matildas' Sam Kerr and Lisa De Vanna.

== History ==
Football was officially established in May 1896 by Sir Septimus Burt, Western Australia's first Attorney General. The Western Australia state soccer team first played in 1902 against the touring English cricket team. In subsequent years, the State team has played various matches against other nations, other states, and professional clubs in exhibition and practice matches. The first live television broadcast of a football game in Western Australia was in 1960, when the ABC showed part of a match between Swan Valley and Windmills at Bayswater Oval. To commemorate the 100th anniversary of the game's foundation in Western Australia, a Hall of Fame for distinguished players was established.

The first recorded women's football match in Western Australia was played in 1946. Two country ladies sides played in an exhibition match in Margaret River.

== Participation ==
Category	2021/22	2023/24
Adult Male		90,770
Adult Female		26,479
Total	111,085	117,248

== National representation ==
In 1994, a group of businessmen led by Joe Claudio formed the Perth Kangaroos IFC. The club competed in the 1994 Singapore Professional Soccer League. The Kangaroos finished the league season undefeated and easily won the Singapore league title. However, with dwindling support and resources, the experiment proved to be a financial disaster and Perth Kangaroos IFC soon folded.

Perth Glory FC are the only West Australian team to compete in the current national A-League and also participated in the now defunct National Soccer League since 1996. Perth Glory men's side were one of the most successful teams of the NSL era, as premiers of 1999/2000, 2001/02 and 2003/04, and champions in 2003 and 2004. The club has had relatively less success since the beginning of the A-League, and as of 2018, have been A-League runner up once in 2012, and FFA Cup runner up twice in 2014 and 2015.

Perth Glory also have a women's side which was established in 2008 and competes in Australia's national W-League. Perth Glory's women's team has had notable success since its inception, achieving a premiership in 2014, and finishing as playoff runner up in 2014 and 2017.

== Football competitions in WA ==
=== Leagues ===
League Structure (Men)
- National Premier Leagues Western Australia
- Football West State League Division 1
- Football West State League Division 2
- Football West Amateur League Premier Division
- Amateur League - 4 lower Divisions
- Metropolitan League - 10 lower Divisions
- Leagues run in parallel by other Regional Associations throughout the state

The NPL WA is the highest league in WA, one step below the national A-League, and is a division within the National Premier Leagues structure. The League Champion (top of the table) at the end of the season enters a national play-off series against the NPL champions of other states to determine the overall NPL Champion.

Below the NPL, the Football West competition includes the State leagues (broadly at a semi-professional level), Amateur leagues, and Metropolitan leagues (often referred to as 'social' league).

League Structure (Women)
- WA Women's State League Premier Division
- WA Women's State League First Division
- Metropolitan League - 6 lower Divisions

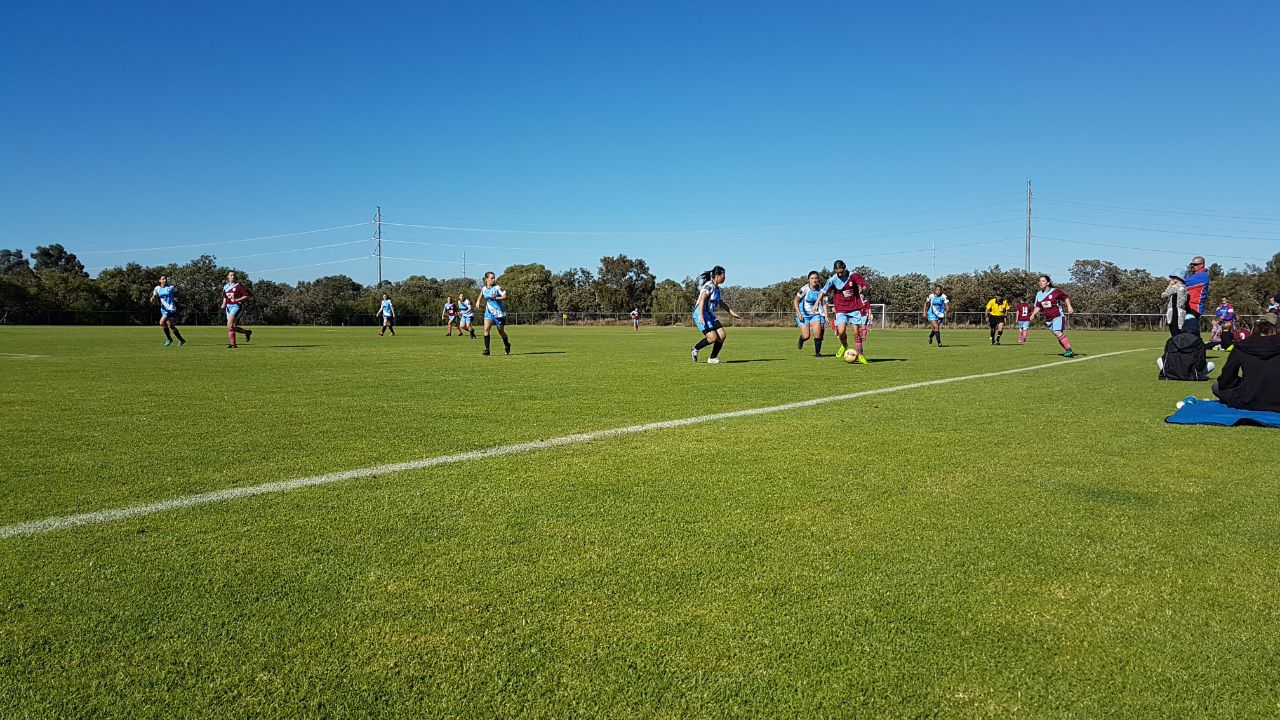
Ladies play in a 3rd tier amateur football game between Leeming and Bunbury

=== Knockout Cups ===
The premier male knockout cup competition is the Football West State Cup, run by Football West. Since 2014 the two State Cup finalists also qualify for the national FFA Cup competition.

Other Cup competitions include the Amateur Cup for the Men's Amateur Divisions, the Metropolitan Cup for the Men's Metropolitan Divisions, the Women's State Cup, and the Women's Metropolitan Cup for the Women's Metropolitan Divisions.

== International matches ==
Australia's international men's and women's teams, the Socceroos and Matildas, occasionally play matches in Perth. Men's games have included a friendly against Indonesia in March 2005, and an Asian confederation World Cup qualifying match against Bangladesh in September 2015. The Matildas played their first ever match in Perth in March 2018, a friendly against Thailand as a warm up for the 2018 AFC Women's Asian Cup.

== Futsal and indoor soccer ==
Futsal and indoor soccer have become popular sports in Western Australia since the 1990s, with games occurring between men, women, mixed teams and juniors. In Perth, weeknight and weekend competitions run at a number of sports centres such as Lords Subiaco, Loftus and Shenton Park. Top level competition is run by the WA State Futsal League.
