= Football West National Training Centre =

FW NTC
- Full name: Football West National Training Centre
- Founded: 2006; 20 years ago
- League: Football West Women's Premier League
- 2019: 5th
- Website: http://www.footballwest.com.au/index.php?id=94

Football West National Training Centre, simply known as FW NTC, is a soccer academy based in Perth, Western Australia.

== History ==
The academy was established by Football West in conjunction with FFA and the WA Department of Sport and Recreation in 2006 to operate as an establishment where young players could be assisted to prepare for the game at the highest level.

The boys' team played in the Football West State League in 2012 and 2013, however did not play for points. They also participated in the FFA State Institute Challenge. The boys' program was replaced by the Perth Glory NPL program in 2014.

== Notable male academy graduates ==
As of November 2018

Name	Current club	Position	Current status
Eli Babalj	(Australia) Brisbane Roar	FW	Playing
Mark Birighitti	(Australia) Melbourne City	GK	Playing
Daniel De Silva	(Australia) Sydney FC	MF	Playing
Jesse Makarounas	(Australia) Moreland City	FW	Playing
Sam Mitchinson	(Australia) Green Gully	DF	Playing
Scott Neville	(Australia) Perth Glory	DF	Playing
Brandon O'Neill	(Australia) Sydney FC	MF	Playing
Mitchell Oxborrow	(Australia) Broadmeadow Magic	MF	Playing
Josh Risdon	(Australia) Western Sydney Wanderers	DF	Playing
Trent Sainsbury	(Netherlands) PSV Eindhoven	DF	Playing
Adam Taggart	(South Korea) Suwon Samsung Bluewings	FW	Playing

== Women's team ==
The FW NTC Women's team are one of the inaugural teams in the new National Premier Leagues WA Women competition (which commenced in 2020), and is a part of the National Premier Leagues Women’s structure. Previously they had been a part of the Women's Premier League competition (2018–2019); prior to that, they were a part of the Women's State League Premier Division (since at least 2008).

=== Current women's squad ===
As of 10 September 2022

Note: Flags indicate national team as defined under FIFA eligibility rules; some limited exceptions apply. Players may hold more than one non-FIFA nationality.

No.	Pos.	Nation	Player
—		AUS	Mischa Anderson
—		AUS	Lilly Bailey
—		AUS	Georgia Cassidy
—		AUS	Jenna Harnwell
—		AUS	Grace Johnston
—		AUS	Tanika Lala
—		AUS	Violet Longmore

No.	Pos.	Nation	Player
—		AUS	Sophie Meaden
—		AUS	Anna Powell
—		AUS	Ava Richards
—		AUS	Louise Tana
—		AUS	Natalia Vega Mena
—		AUS	Abbey Woolley
