= Gwelup Croatia SC =

Football club in Perth, Western Australia

- Full name: Gwelup Croatia Soccer Club
- Founded: 1988; 38 years ago
- Ground: Croatian Sporting Complex, Gwelup
- President: Jurica Denona
- Manager: Mitchell Prentice
- League: State League 1
- 2025: 6th of 12
- Website: https://www.gwelupcroatiasc.com/
Home colours	Away colours

Gwelup Croatia is an Australian semi-professional soccer club based in Gwelup in Perth, Western Australia, founded in 1988. Gwelup Croatia currently competes in the Football West State League 1, with matches played at the Croatian Sporting Complex in Gwelup. They also compete in the Metropolitan League, Masters League, Ladies League, and in Juniors teams. The club regularly competes in the Australian-Croatian Soccer Tournament.

In 2018 they qualified for the Round of 32 in the FFA Cup.

== History ==
Founded in 1988 by Croatian immigrants, they won the Amateur Premier Division back to back in 2015 and 2016 before being promoted to the State League and winning Division 2 on their first attempt in 2017. The club won State League Division 1 in 2019 and were promoted to the NPLWA.

== Current squad ==
As of 8 February 2025

Note: Flags indicate national team as defined under FIFA eligibility rules; some limited exceptions apply. Players may hold more than one non-FIFA nationality.

No.	Pos.	Nation	Player
1	GK	AUS	Josiah Godfrey
2	DF	SEN	Alassane Fall
3	DF	AUS	Paul Grant
4	DF	AUS	Nicolas Echeverria
5	MF	AUS	Jai Rawling
6	MF	AUS	Kade Fearnall
7	MF	AUS	Robert Ferrante
8	FW	IRL	Shaun Doherty
9	MF	AUS	Toby Robertson
10	MF	AUS	Ben Campbell
11	MF	FRA	Jeremie Mba

No.	Pos.	Nation	Player
12	MF	AUS	Debaba Mtwale
13	MF	AUS	Jack Bardsley
14	FW	RSA	Emmanuel Langoya
15	DF	AUS	Matthew Lenzo
16	GK	VEN	Andres Zavarce
17	FW	GRE	Christos Vaenas
18	GK	AUS	Rocco Liberti
19	FW	AUS	Miklos Imre
20	MF	AUS	Daniel Iuliano
24	DF	ITA	Gianluca Paiano
23	FW	AUS	Matt Henry
24	DF	AUS	Giordano Sportiello
—	FW	AUS	Jacob Rossi

== Current coaching staff ==
- Taki Nicolaidis – First Team Coach

== Honours ==
- 2019 Football West State League Division 1 Champions
- 2018 Football West State Cup Finalist
- 2017 Football West State League Division 2 Champions
- 2016 Amateur League Premier Division Champions
- 2015 Amateur League Premier Division Champions

== See also ==
- List of Croatian football clubs in Australia
- Australian-Croatian Soccer Tournament
- Croatian Australian
