= Olympic Kingsway SC =

Association football club in Perth, Western Australia

Olympic Kingsway
- Full name: Olympic Kingsway Sports Club
- Nickname: Green Machine
- Founded: 1953; 73 years ago
- Ground: Kingsway Sporting Complex, Madeley
- President: Steven Nelkovski
- Manager: David Tough
- League: NPL Western Australia
- 2025: 2nd of 12
- Website: www.olympic-kingsway.com.au
Home colours	Away colours

The Olympic Kingsway Sports Club, often referenced as Kingsway Olympic, is an association football (soccer) club from Perth, Western Australia. The club was founded in 1953 by Macedonian Greek immigrants from Greece Region of Macedonia. They moved to their current location at the Kingsway Sporting Complex in Madeley in 1973. Currently, they have 400 players in teams ranging from Under 6 to under 16, as well as senior Saturday and Sunday Teams. The club is currently competing in the 2025 season in the National Premier Leagues Western Australia.

== History ==
The club was founded in 1953 and was promoted to the top division of the State of Western Australia in 1959. For the 1978 season, the club was renamed Olympic Kingsway. They won both the 1978 and 1980 Western Australian State League titles, which qualified them for the 1979 and 1981 NSL Cups. During this period, they also won the Top 4 Cup three times in succession (1978–1980).

They moved back to the Amateur Premier Division for six seasons (2006–2011).

In 2025 Hahn Australia Cup Round of 32, headlined by Olympic Kingsway edging a seven-goal thriller against 2024 Finalists Melbourne Victory.

== Honours ==
- 2020: State League 1 Champions and Top 4 Cup Winners
- 2022: State League 1 Champions (Promoted to the NPLWA Division)
- 2024: National Premier League WA Premiers, Top Four Cup winners, Football West State Cup winners

== Notable former players ==
Since the 1990s, Olympic Kingsway has developed many future Australian professional football players, including:

- Daniel De Silva
- Richard Garcia
- Stan Lazaridis
- Nick Ward
