= Subiaco AFC =

- Full name: Subiaco AFC
- Nicknames: The Lions, Maroons
- Founded: 1910
- Ground: Rosalie Park
- Capacity: 1000
- Manager: Troy Reid
- League: State League 1
- 2026: 11th of 12
- Website: https://subiacosoccer.asn.au/
Home colours	Away colours

Subiaco AFC is a soccer club based in the city of Subiaco, Western Australia, with their home grounds at Rosalie Park. They are considered one of the biggest footballing teams in the state, with over 110 teams participating in various Football West competitions.

== History ==
Early Years

The club was formed by E.M. Lakyn in 1910 as the Subiaco British Association Football Club. Playing in black and white, they competed in WA British Football Association League at the Perth Oval and Wellington Square. In 1914 however, all play was suspended for six years due to World War 1.

1920s

Subiaco returned to the field in 1923, this time wearing the current colours of maroon and gold. It was also during this time where the club began to grow and was able to field junior and reserve teams by the mid-1920s. It was not until 1928 which saw the club claim its first silverware, winning the Division Two title.

1930s

At the turn of the decade, the club was renamed to Subiaco Soccer Club. They saw more success in this time period, defeating Midland 2-1 to clinch their second Division Two title, a unique accomplishment at the time.

1940s

Due to World War 2, all football was halted until 1946, where Subiaco returned under the name Shenton Park Rangers. They used Onslow Road Reserve as their new home ground. During this period, they were promoted to the top division and relegated the next year after not winning a single game.

1950s

The 50s saw success for the club. Shenton Park Rangers junior team won the league in 1951, going undefeated throughout the entire season. The club was once again renamed in 1952, this time to Subiaco City. The name of their home ground also changed from Onslow Road Reserve to how it is known today, Rosalie Park. They won the Division Two title for a third time the same year.

1960s

During the 60s, football in Western Australia was reformed. In 1962, Subiaco City joined the new Soccer Federation of Western Australia, a new semi-professional competition for teams all over West Australia. 1966 also saw Subiaco win their fourth Division Two title in their history. Three years later, Subiaco fielded their first woman's team, under the name Subiaco City.

1970s

The 70s saw a dark period for Subiaco. They were relegated to Division Three in 1971 and failed to win promotion for a majority of the decade. There only success was a victory in the Division Three Top Four Cup, however they failed to clinch promotion.

1980s

Subiaco began the decade with promotion back to the Second Division. The first clubhouse was built at Rosalie Park, named after Mr Fred Cumber, the club president of the time. In 1984, the club split after a disagreement between senior figures. A new club was formed called Subiaco Amateur Soccer Club, later changing their name to Subiaco United, which was based at Rosalie Park. The remaining Subiaco City men's teams moved north and changed their name to Subiaco Stirling Soccer Club, while the youth teams remained at Rosalie Park under the name Subiaco City Juniors.

1990s

Glory was brought back to Subiaco United in 1992, when they once again won the Division Two title. In the north, Subiaco Stirling moved again to Balga, renaming to Balga West Coast, before folding in 1993. Subiaco United continued to make progress however, with further upgrades to Rosalie Park pitches, floodlighting and the clubhouse, along with fielding another six woman's teams after a merger with Curtin University Woman's Soccer Club.

2000s

Subiaco United saw continued success through the new century with their first Division One title win in their history in 2001. It was only another seven years until they saw more silverware, with their second Division One title in 2008. 2009 was the final year to be played under the Subiaco United banner, with talks going on with Subiaco City Juniors.

New Era (2010s)

At the start of the new decade, the two clubs remaining at Rosalie Park, Subiaco United and Subiaco City Juniors, reached an agreement to merge and create a new joint club, Subiaco AFC. In 2014, Subiaco accepted an invitation to the newly formed National Premier League (NPL). Since this date, the club has continued to grow and now has over 90 teams across all age groups.

2020s

The COVID-19 pandemic cancelled the 2020 season. Subiaco continue in the State League 1 division, avoiding relegation on the final day of the season in 2022 with a 2-1 win over rivals Western Knights. In the 2023 season, Subiaco defeated Curtain University 2-0 in the relegation play-off final to remain in State League 1. In the same year, both the 18s and reserve teams won their respective leagues.

== Crest and Colours ==
=== Club Crest ===
The crest, or badge, of Subiaco AFC is a lion with a mane of black, maroon and gold. It is placed on a background of gold with a white and maroon border. The words 'Subiaco AFC' are shown along the top of the badge.

=== Colours ===
The colours of Subiaco AFC are mainly maroon, white and gold, which is shared with the Italian football team, AS Roma, the closest side to the Italian City of Subiaco. Black can also be seen on the club badge, but it is rarely used on kits, home or away.

== Men's team ==
The men's first team currently participates in the third tier of Western Australian soccer in the Football West State League Division 2 competition.

=== Current squad ===
As of March 2020

Note: Flags indicate national team as defined under FIFA eligibility rules; some limited exceptions apply. Players may hold more than one non-FIFA nationality.

No.	Pos.	Nation	Player
1	GK	AUS	Tando Velaphi
3		AUS	Matthew Allen
4	MF	AUS	Ethan Johnson
5	MF	SCO	Ben Bathgate
6	DF	AUS	Jeremy Tshongo
7	MF	AUS	Oliver Lebihan
8	FW	MRI	Ludovic Boi
9	FW	FRA	Rubens Faure
10	FW	ENG	Gavin Knight (captain)
11	FW	AUS	Kaleb Morrison
12	MF	ENG	Oscar Barry
13	FW	AUS	Zac Benabid
14	MF	AUS	Dean Evans

No.	Pos.	Nation	Player
15		AUS	Christopher Harradine
16	MF	AUS	Adrian Manno
17	DF	POR	Alexandre Coelho
18	DF	AUS	Daniel Dols
19		AUS	Sachin Tana
20	MF	RSA	Jonty Pearson
21	DF	AUS	Isaac Scellier
22		AUS	Lazar Spasojevic
99	GK	AUS	Navarone Synnerdahl
105	MF	AUS	Tarek Atta

=== Seasons ===
Season	League											Statewide Cup	FFA Cup
Season	Name (national level)	Pld	W	D	L	GF	GA	GD	Pts	Position	Western Australia Finals	Statewide Cup	FFA Cup
2014	NPL WA (2)	22	4	2	16	26	55	−29	14	11th	DNQ	Semi Finals	DNQ
2015	NPL WA (2)	22	6	2	14	27	36	−9	20	9th	Did Not Apply	Quarter Finals	DNQ
2016	NPL WA (2)	22	5	2	15	20	53	−33	17	12th	DNQ	Round 4	DNQ
2020 (COVID)	WA State League Division 1 (3)	5	1	3	1	4	8	-4	6	10th	Cancelled	Cancelled	Cancelled
2021	WA State League Division 1 (3)	22	6	3	13	26	45	-19	21	10th	DNQ	Round 4	DNQ
2022	WA State League Division 1 (3)	22	5	2	12	31	47	-16	20	10th	DNQ	Round 2	DNQ
2023	WA State League Division 1 (3)	22	5	4	13	36	50	-14	19	11th	DNQ	Round 2	DNQ
2024	WA State League Division 1 (3)	22	11	4	7	35	34	1	37	5th	DNQ	Round 4	DNQ
2025	WA State League Division 1 (3)	4	1	1	2	6	7	-1	4	10th		Round 6 (ongoing)	

As off 06/05/2025

== Women's team ==
The Subiaco AFC Women's team are one of the inaugural teams in the new National Premier Leagues WA Women competition, which commenced in 2020. Previously they had been a part of the Women State League Division 1 (SL1) competition since at least 2012, and were SL1 Champions in the 2019 season. They currently compete in the National Premier League WA Woman competition as of the end of the 2021 season.

Seasons
Season	League									
Season	Name (national level)	Pld	W	D	L	GF	GA	GD	Pts	Position
2020	NPLW WA (2)	14	0	2	12	4	70	-66	2	8th
2021	NPLW WA (2)	21	2	3	16	13	58	-45	9	8th
2022	NPLW WA (2)	21	6	3	12	34	61	-27	21	7th
2023	NPLW WA (2)	21	5	2	14	40	64	-24	17	7th
2024	NPLW WA (2)	20	5	4	11	31	65	-34	19	6th
2025	NPLW WA (2)	6	2	1	3	13	14	-1	7	6th

As of 06/05/2025
