= Perth RedStar FC =

Association football club in Perth, Western Australia

- Full name: Perth RedStar Football Club
- Nickname: Stars
- Founded: 1992 (Joondalup City); 1999 (ECU Joondalup); 2022 (Perth RedStar)
- Ground: RedStar Arena, at ECU Joondalup
- Capacity: 2,500
- President: Mark Donnelly
- Manager: Callum Salmon
- League: NPL Western Australia
- 2025: 3rd of 12
- Website: www.perthredstar.com.au
Home colours	Away colours

Perth RedStar Football Club is an Australian soccer club from Joondalup, Western Australia currently playing in the National Premier Leagues Western Australia and National Premier Leagues WA Women.

Their home ground is the RedStar Arena at the Joondalup campus of Edith Cowan University.

== History ==
The club was formed in 1992 as Joondalup City Soccer Club and played at the Gumblossom Park in Quinns Rocks. They moved to the Arena Joondalup in 1995 and in their first season in the Semi-pro league finished third in the Professional Soccer Federation of WA third division a great start to top-flight football in the state.

In the first season of the Soccer West Coast Division One, City won promotion to the Premier League as Champions in 1996. Joondalup City's first season in the top flight in 1997 was a moderately successful one, where they finished in a mid-table position and improved to third place in 1998.

In 1999 the club changed its name to ECU Joondalup SC. A successful season saw Paul Simmons' side win the club's first major trophy by taking out the Premier League title, which was their first-ever Premiership after only four seasons in the professional ranks.

Under the guidance of former Perth Glory manager Kenny Lowe, ECU Joondalup SC won their first Championship in 2020 (no Premier was awarded), with striker Danny Hodgson also claiming the season's Golden Boot award with 17 goals.

In February 2022, ECU Joondalup SC and Northern Redbacks WSC announced a merger to create Perth RedStar FC as a new club.

== Current men's squad ==
As of 10 September 2022

Note: Flags indicate national team as defined under FIFA eligibility rules; some limited exceptions apply. Players may hold more than one non-FIFA nationality.

No.	Pos.	Nation	Player
1	GK	AUS	Luca Iovene
2	DF	AUS	Nicholas Walsh
3	DF	AUS	Blair Govan (captain)
4	MF	AUS	Daniel Walsh
5	MF	AUS	Benson Nsegetse
6	DF	ENG	Sam Pollard
8	MF	AUS	Tom Hough
9	FW	SCO	Daryl Nicol
10	MF	AUS	Matthew George
11	DF	AUS	Dennis Galán
13	FW	AUS	Nyle Weale
14	MF	AUS	Oliver Leeming
15	FW	AUS	Theodore Leeming
16	DF	AUS	George Losondo
17	FW	AUS	Sonny O'Shea
18	MF	AUS	Daniel Katz

No.	Pos.	Nation	Player
19	DF	SCO	Ryan Finnie
20	MF	AUS	Andrew Palmer
21		AUS	Harley Zoric
22	MF	AUS	Dhuor Chol
24		AUS	Reece Bantleman
31	FW	AUS	Jack Connolly
33	GK	AUS	Liam Reddy
66	GK	AUS	Sonny Inzalaco
77	FW	AUS	Joel Chianese
—		AUS	Josh Kingston
—	DF	AUS	Takudzwa Tarrel Chisunga
—		AUS	Keane Embleton-Hill
—		AUS	Jay Patel
—	DF	AUS	Andy Higgins
—		AUS	Oscar Malfiore
—	DF	AUS	Riley Warland
—	MF	AUS	Brandon O'Neill (on loan from Perth Glory)

== Current women's squad ==
As of 10 September 2022

Note: Flags indicate national team as defined under FIFA eligibility rules; some limited exceptions apply. Players may hold more than one non-FIFA nationality.

No.	Pos.	Nation	Player
—		AUS	Carla Bennett
—		AUS	Shawn Billam
—		AUS	Kim Carroll
—	DF	AUS	Sarah Carroll
—		AUS	Jacinta Coleman
—		AUS	Tessa de Leo
—		AUS	Maya Diederichsen
—		AUS	Quyen Doan
—		AUS	Emily Dunn

No.	Pos.	Nation	Player
—		AUS	Olivia Goud
—		AUS	Renee Leota
—		AUS	Alkira Mogridge
—		AUS	Jade Odonohoe
—		AUS	Jayna Ridley
—		AUS	Bronwyn Studman
—		AUS	Andrea Teixeira
—		AUS	Larissa Walsh
—		AUS	Olivia Wood

== Staff ==
- Technical director: Andrew Ord
- First-team coach: Callum Salmon
- Assistant coach: David Butterfield

== Notable past players ==
List includes players from ECU Joondalup youth or senior teams that have gone on to represent the Australian national team.

- Chris Herd
- Brandon O'Neill
- Josh Risdon
- Adam Taggart
- Rhys Williams
- Ryan Williams

== Coaches ==
- Paul Simmons (1992–2002)
- Stuart Kamasz (2003)
- Paul Simmons (2004)
- Stuart Currie (2005)
- Eric Williams (2005)
- John Brown (2006)
- Willie McNally (2006–2008)
- Syd Amphlett (2008–2011)
- Salv Todaro (2011–2013)
- Dale McCulloch (2013–2019)
- Kenny Lowe (2020–present)

== Honours ==
- 2020, 2022 NPL WA Champions
- 1998, 2002 Boral Challenge Cup Winners
- 1999, 2023 WA Premier League/NPL WA Minor Premiers
- 1996 First Division Winners
