= Sorrento FC =

Football club in Perth, Western Australia

- Full name: Sorrento Football Club
- Nickname: The Gulls / Sky Blues
- Founded: 1972
- Ground: Percy Doyle Reserve
- Capacity: 5,251
- Chairman: Nico Hoyle
- Manager: Reece Vitiglia
- League: NPL Western Australia
- 2026: 8th of 12
- Website: http://www.sorrentofc.com.au
Home colours	Away colours

Sorrento Football Club, commonly known as Sorrento FC, is a Western Australian semi-professional soccer club based in the northern Perth, Western Australia suburb of Duncraig. They currently compete in the National Premier Leagues Western Australia. The club was founded in 1972.

== Honours ==
- Football West Premier League/NPL WA
  - Champions: 2001, 2006, 2008, 2012
- Football West State League Division 1
  - Champions: 2024
- Football West State Cup
  - Winners: 2011, 2012, 2015
