= 2023–24 Perth Glory FC season =

Perth Glory
2023–24 season
- Chairman: Ross Pelligra
- Head Coach: Kenny Lowe (interim) (to 3 August 2023); Alen Stajcic (from 3 August 2023)
- Stadium: HBF Park
- A-League Men: 12th
- A-League Men Finals: DNQ
- Australia Cup: Play-offs
- Top goalscorer: League: Adam Taggart (20); All: Adam Taggart (20)
- Highest home attendance: 8,252 vs. Wellington Phoenix (24 February 2024); A-League Men
- Lowest home attendance: 4,651 vs. Western United (21 April 2024); A-League Men
- Average home league attendance: 5,964
- Biggest win: 2–0 vs. Central Coast Mariners (H) (4 November 2023); A-League Men; 4–2 vs. Melbourne City (H) (2 February 2024); A-League Men
- Biggest defeat: 0–8 vs. Melbourne City (A) (14 April 2024); A-League Men
Home colours	Away colours

The 2023–24 season was the 27th in the history of Perth Glory Football Club, the 19th in the A-League Men and the ninth in the Australia Cup.

== Players ==
Note: Flags indicate national team as defined under FIFA eligibility rules; some limited exceptions apply. Players may hold more than one non-FIFA nationality.

No.	Pos.	Nation	Player
1	GK	NZL	Oliver Sail
2	DF	AUS	John Koutroumbis
3	DF	AUS	Jacob Muir
4	DF	AUS	Luke Bodnar
5	DF	ENG	Mark Beevers (co-captain)
7	FW	MKD	Stefan Colakovski
8	MF	AUS	Mustafa Amini
9	FW	AUS	David Williams
11	FW	AUS	Adam Zimarino
13	GK	AUS	Cameron Cook
14	DF	AUS	Riley Warland
15	DF	AUS	Aleksandar Šušnjar

No.	Pos.	Nation	Player
16	DF	AUS	Joshua Rawlins (on loan from Jong Utrecht)
17	FW	AUS	Jarrod Carluccio (on loan from Western Sydney Wanderers)
19	MF	AUS	Trent Ostler (scholarship)
20	MF	AUS	Giordano Colli
21	MF	CYP	Antonis Martis
22	FW	AUS	Adam Taggart (co-captain)
23	FW	AUS	Daniel Bennie (scholarship)
25	MF	AUS	Jaylan Pearman (scholarship)
28	DF	AUS	Kaelan Majekodunmi (scholarship)
29	DF	CUW	Darryl Lachman
77	FW	AUS	Bruce Kamau

== Transfers ==
=== Transfers in ===
No.	Position	Player	Transferred from	Type/fee	Contract length	Date	Ref.
1	GK	(New Zealand) Oliver Sail	Wellington Phoenix	Free transfer	3 years	1 June 2023	
15	DF	Aleksandar Šušnjar	(Serbia) Novi Pazar	Free transfer	1 year	1 September 2023	
77	FW	Bruce Kamau	Unattached	Free transfer	1 year	4 September 2023	
14	DF	Riley Warland	(Australia) Perth RedStar	Free transfer	1 year	12 September 2023	
24	MF	Oliver Bozanic	Western Sydney Wanderers	Loan	4 months	13 September 2023	
17	MF	Jarrod Carluccio	Western Sydney Wanderers	Loan	4 months	13 September 2023	
21	MF	(Cyprus) Antonis Martis	(Australia) Sutherland Sharks	Free transfer	1 year	15 September 2023	
16	DF	Joshua Rawlins	(Netherlands) Jong Utrecht	Loan	5 months	29 January 2024	

==== From youth squad ====
N	Pos.	Nat.	Name	Age	Notes
23	FW	(Australia)	Daniel Bennie	17	scholarship

=== Transfers out ===
No.	Position	Player	Transferred to	Type/fee	Date	Ref.
3	MF	Jacob Dowse	Unattached	End of contract	17 March 2023	
1	GK	Brad Jones	Retired		24 May 2023	
16	MF	Keegan Jelacic	(Belgium) Gent	Undisclosed	30 May 2023	
14	DF	Jack Clisby	Unattached	End of contract	14 June 2023	
19	MF	Zach Duncan	(Denmark) AGF	End of loan	14 June 2023	
21	DF	Antonee Burke-Gilroy	Unattached	End of contract	14 June 2023	
23	MF	Mitchell Oxborrow	Unattached	End of contract	14 June 2023	
24	MF	(Spain) Adrián Sardinero	Unattached	End of contract	14 June 2023	
25	DF	Matt Hatch	Unattached	Mutual contract termination	14 June 2023	
27	DF	Jacob Young	Unattached	End of contract	14 June 2023	
30	GK	Pierce Clark	Unattached	End of contract	14 June 2023	
31	MF	Chris Donnell	(England) Fulham	Undisclosed	6 July 2023	
7	FW	Ryan Williams	(India) Bengaluru	Mutual contract termination	28 July 2023	
15	DF	Jordan Elsey	(India) East Bengal	Mutual contract termination	28 July 2023	
16	DF	Joseph Forde	(Republic of Ireland) Waterford	Mutual contract termination	8 January 2024	
24	MF	Oliver Bozanic	Western Sydney Wanderers	End of loan	12 January 2024	
10	MF	(Tunisia) Salim Khelifi	Melbourne Victory	Loan	19 January 2024	
6	MF	(Republic of Ireland) Aaron McEneff	(Republic of Ireland) Shamrock Rovers	Loan (Note: McEneff was signed by Shamrock Rovers initially on loan with the deal to become permanent at the end of the 2024 season, with McEneff having signed a long-term contract)	19 January 2024	
12	FW	Luke Ivanovic	(Finland) Lahti	Mutual contract termination	5 February 2024	

=== Contract extensions ===
No.	Name	Position	Duration	Date	Notes and references
43	Adam Zimarino	Striker	2 years	1 June 2023	
44	Jaylan Pearman	Attacking midfielder		10 July 2023	scholarship
9	David Williams	Striker		10 August 2023	
17	Jarrod Carluccio	Winger	5 months	2 February 2024	Loan extension

== Pre-season and friendlies ==
Win Draw Loss Fixtures

15 July 2023 Australia Tour 2023	Perth Glory	2–6	(England) West Ham United	Perth
18:00 AWST	Luizão 45' (o.g.); Bennie 73'	Report	Lachman 2' (o.g.); Scamacca 20' (pen.); Bowen 55', 86'; Palmieri 69'; Mubama 82'	Stadium: Optus Stadium; Attendance: 24,723; Referee: Alireza Faghani

1 September 2023	Stirling Macedonia (Australia)	2–5	Perth Glory	Perth
19:00 AWST	Tanevski 57'; Toto 66'	Report	Taggart 2', 14', 22', 44'; Williams 89'	Stadium: Macedonia Park; Referee: Shane Skinner

5 September 2023	Olympic Kingsway (Australia)	1–3	Perth Glory	Perth
19:30 AWST	Lebib 67'	Report	Taggart 26'; Colli 49', 59'	Stadium: Kingsway Reserve; Referee: Shane Skinner

12 September 2023	Floreat Athena (Australia)	0–4	Perth Glory	Perth
19:30 AWST		Report	Beevers 27'; Bennie 28', 40'; Anasmo 82'	Stadium: E & D Litis Stadium; Referee: Shane Skinner

24 September 2023 Gold Fields Challenge Cup	WA State Team (Western Australia)	0–3	Perth Glory	Perth
18:00		Report	Williams 79', 88'; Martis 82'	Stadium: State Football Centre; Referee: Shane Skinner

1 October 2023	Perth Glory	3–1	Melbourne Victory	Bunbury
15:00 AWST	Taggart 17'; Beevers 70'; Ivanovic 81'	Report	Brimmer 89'	Stadium: Hay Park; Attendance: ~2,000; Referee: Shane Skinner

4 October 2023	Perth Glory	0–4	Melbourne Victory	Perth
19:00 AWST		Report	Fornaroli 4', 35' (pen.); Velupillay 41'; Adams 90+1'	Stadium: Dorrien Gardens; Referee: Shane Skinner

== Competitions ==
=== Overall record ===
Competition	First match	Last match	Starting round	Final position	Record							
Competition	First match	Last match	Starting round	Final position	Pld	W	D	L	GF	GA	GD	Win %
A-League Men	22 October 2023	28 April 2024	Matchday 1	12th	27	5	7	15	46	69	−23	18.52
Australia Cup	18 July 2023		Play-offs	Play-offs	1	0	0	1	0	4	−4	0.00
Total					28	5	7	16	46	73	−27	17.86

Last updated: 28 April 2024
Source: Soccerway

=== A-League Men ===
==== League table ====
Pos	Team	Pld	W	D	L	GF	GA	GD	Pts	Qualification
8	Adelaide United	27	9	5	13	52	53	−1	32	
9	Brisbane Roar	27	8	6	13	42	55	−13	30	Qualification for 2024 Australia Cup play-offs
10	Newcastle Jets	27	6	10	11	39	47	−8	28	Qualification for 2024 Australia Cup play-offs
11	Western United	27	7	5	15	36	55	−19	26	Qualification for 2024 Australia Cup play-offs
12	Perth Glory	27	5	7	15	46	69	−23	22	Qualification for 2024 Australia Cup play-offs

Source: A-Leagues
Rules for classification: 1) points; 2) wins; 3) goal difference; 4) goals scored; 5) head-to-head results; 5a) head-to-head points; 5b) head-to-head goal difference; 6) Fair Play points; 7) away goal difference; 8) away goals per match; 9) home goal difference; 10) home goals per match; 11) toss of a coin in an event of a tie of two clubs.

==== Results summary ====
Overall								Home						Away					
Pld	W	D	L	GF	GA	GD	Pts	W	D	L	GF	GA	GD	W	D	L	GF	GA	GD
27	5	7	15	46	69	−23	22	4	4	6	29	30	−1	1	3	9	17	39	−22

Last updated: 28 April 2024.
Source: Ultimate A-League

Notes

- Home figures include Perth Glory's 4–3 loss on neutral ground against Wellington Phoenix on 14 January 2024.

==== Results by round ====
Round	1	2	3	4	5	6	7	8	9	10	11	27	13	14	15	16	17	18	19	20	21	22	12	23	24	25	26
Ground	H	A	H	A	A	A	H	A	H	A	H	N	A	A	H	A	H	H	A	H	H	A	H	H	A	H	A
Result	D	L	W	L	L	L	L	D	W	L	L	L	W	D	W	D	W	D	L	D	L	L	D	L	L	L	L
Position	5	8	6	8	8	10	11	12	11	11	11	11	11	11	11	11	10	9	9	9	10	10	10	12	12	12	12
Points	1	1	4	4	4	4	4	5	8	8	8	8	11	12	15	16	19	20	20	21	21	21	22	22	22	22	22

Updated to match(es) played on 29 April 2024. Source: Ultimate A-League
A = Away; H = Home; N = Neutral; W = Win; D = Draw; L = Loss

==== Matches ====
Win Draw Loss Fixtures

22 October 2023 1	Perth Glory	2–2	Newcastle Jets	Perth
16:45 AWST	Taggart 2'; Colakovski 64'	Report	Grozos 14'; Stamatelopoulos 90+2'	Stadium: HBF Park; Attendance: 6,592; Referee: Tim Danaskos

28 October 2023 2	Wellington Phoenix	2–1	Perth Glory	Wellington
17:30 NZDT	Zawada 9'; Kraev 74'	Report	Beevers 59'	Stadium: Sky Stadium; Attendance: 6,101; Referee: Daniel Elder

4 November 2023 3	Perth Glory	2–0	Central Coast Mariners	Perth
18:45 AWST	Colakovski 52'; Taggart 90+3'	Report		Stadium: HBF Park; Attendance: 6,798; Referee: Shaun Evans

11 November 2023 4	Western Sydney Wanderers	2–0	Perth Glory	Sydney
14:30 AEDT	Clisby 50'; Russell 57'	Report		Stadium: CommBank Stadium; Attendance: 9,971; Referee: Daniel Elder

26 November 2023 5	Brisbane Roar	2–1	Perth Glory	Brisbane
14:00 AEST	Hore 56'; O'Shea 65'	Report	Šušnjar 90+4'	Stadium: Suncorp Stadium; Attendance: 9,769; Referee: Ben Abraham

2 December 2023 6	Sydney FC	3–2	Perth Glory	Sydney
19:45 AEDT	Lolley 33'; Mak 44'; Šušnjar 89' (o.g.)	Report	Taggart 63'; Bozanic 90+1'	Stadium: Allianz Stadium; Attendance: 8,182; Referee: Alireza Faghani

8 December 2023 7	Perth Glory	1–2	Melbourne City	Perth
18:45 AWST	Taggart 45+1'	Report	Arslan 38' (pen.); Leckie 66'	Stadium: HBF Park; Attendance: 5,523; Referee: Daniel Cook

16 December 2023 8	Newcastle Jets	2–2	Perth Glory	Newcastle
18:00 AEDT	Stamatelopoulos 26' (pen.); Buhagiar 90+8'	Report	Taggart 47'; Colakovski 55'	Stadium: McDonald Jones Stadium; Attendance: 4,714; Referee: Shaun Evans

23 December 2023 9	Perth Glory	3–2	Macarthur FC	Perth
19:30 AWST	Khelifi 48'; Ivanovic 65'; Williams 90+3'	Report	Millar 30'; Germain 42'	Stadium: HBF Park; Attendance: 5,163; Referee: Adam Bavcar

31 December 2023 10	Central Coast Mariners	4–2	Perth Glory	Gosford
19:00 AEDT	Farrell 28'; Kuol 39'; Túlio 45+4' (pen.), 90+1' (pen.)	Report	Taggart 18'; Colakovski 52'	Stadium: Industree Group Stadium; Attendance: 15,073; Referee: Jack Morgan

6 January 2024 11	Perth Glory	2–3	Melbourne Victory	Perth
18:45 AWST	Taggart 20'; Majekodunmi 89'	Report	Machach 42'; Adams 82'; Folami 90+6'	Stadium: HBF Park; Attendance: 6,120; Referee: Lachlan Keevers

14 January 2024 27	Perth Glory	3–4	Wellington Phoenix	Sydney
19:45 AEDT	Taggart 7'; Šušnjar 50'; Carluccio 70'	Report	Barbarouses 29', 73'; Rufer 45+2'; Payne 57'	Stadium: CommBank Stadium; Attendance: 1,632; Referee: Tim Danaskos

20 January 2024 13	Western Sydney Wanderers	1–2	Perth Glory	Sydney
19:45 AEDT	Sail 90+6' (o.g.)	Report	Colakovski 31'; Williams 87'	Stadium: CommBank Stadium; Attendance: 8,779; Referee: Ben Abraham

28 January 2024 14	Macarthur FC	2–2	Perth Glory	Sydney
17:00 AEDT	Dávila 9'; Germain 82' (pen.)	Report	Amini 72' (pen.); Williams 90+3'	Stadium: Campbelltown Stadium; Attendance: 4,016; Referee: Daniel Elder

2 February 2024 15	Perth Glory	4–2	Melbourne City	Perth
18:45 AWST	Amini 45+4' (pen.); Galloway 68' (o.g.); Taggart 70'; Anasmo 90+8'	Report	Arslan 21', 60'	Stadium: HBF Park; Attendance: 5,494; Referee: Shane Skinner

9 February 2024 16	Adelaide United	3–3	Perth Glory	Adelaide
19:15 ACDT	Ibusuki 9'; Clough 17' (pen.); Kikianis 90+8'	Report	Taggart 31'; Williams 63'; Rawlins 82'	Stadium: Coopers Stadium; Attendance: 8,135; Referee: Ben Abraham

17 February 2024 17	Perth Glory	3–2	Brisbane Roar	Perth
18:45 AWST	Taggart 24', 73'; Colakovski 83'	Report	Mileusnic 29'; Waddingham 36'	Stadium: HBF Park; Attendance: 6,597; Referee: Adam Kersey

24 February 2024 18	Perth Glory	0–0	Wellington Phoenix	Perth
18:45 AWST		Report		Stadium: HBF Park; Attendance: 8,252; Referee: Daniel Elder

2 March 2024 19	Western United	1–0	Perth Glory	Ballarat
17:00 AEDT	Botic 53'	Report		Stadium: Mars Stadium; Attendance: 3,016; Referee: Shaun Evans

9 March 2024 20	Perth Glory	2–2	Newcastle Jets	Perth
18:45 AWST	Taggart 72', 90'	Report	Taylor 40'; Mauragis 54'	Stadium: HBF Park; Attendance: 6,190; Referee: Lachlan Keevers

16 March 2024 21	Perth Glory	1–2	Western Sydney Wanderers	Perth
16:45 AWST	Taggart 45+2'	Report	Borrello 11'; Brook 83'	Stadium: HBF Park; Attendance: 5,952; Referee: Shaun Evans

31 March 2024 22	Melbourne Victory	2–1	Perth Glory	Melbourne
15:00 AEDT	Fornaroli 16', 53'	Report	Bennie 61'	Stadium: AAMI Park; Attendance: 6,223; Referee: Ben Abraham

3 April 2024 12	Perth Glory	1–1	Sydney FC	Perth
18:45 AWST	Majekodunmi 72'	Report	Lolley 25' (pen.)	Stadium: HBF Park; Attendance: 4,862; Referee: Alex King
Note: Originally scheduled for 12 January 2024, was moved due to Unite Round.

7 April 2024 23	Perth Glory	2–4	Adelaide United	Perth
15:00 AWST	Taggart 22', 27'	Report	Ibusuki 30', 50'; Clough 41'; Mauk 45+6'	Stadium: HBF Park; Attendance: 5,338; Referee: Adam Bavcar

14 April 2024 24	Melbourne City	8–0	Perth Glory	Melbourne
15:00 AEST	Natel 14', 29'; Arslan 16', 26', 73'; Majekodunmi 19' (o.g.); Maclaren 60'; Ugarkovic 86'	Report		Stadium: AAMI Park; Attendance: 4,580; Referee: Tim Danaskos

21 April 2024 25	Perth Glory	3–4	Western United	Perth
17:00 AWST	Taggart 23', 47'; Williams 90+3'	Report	Grimaldi 4'; Danzaki 65'; Walatee 74'; Lavale 90+2'	Stadium: HBF Park; Attendance: 4,651; Referee: Shane Skinner

28 April 2024 26	Sydney FC	7–1	Perth Glory	Sydney
15:00 AEST	Courtney-Perkins 5'; Lolley 41', 90+1'; Brattan 45+2' (pen.); Mak 68', 74'; King 81'	Report	Taggart 58'	Stadium: Allianz Stadium; Attendance: 13,225; Referee: Jonathon Barreiro

=== Australia Cup ===
Win Draw Loss

18 July 2023 Play-offs	Perth Glory	0–4	Macarthur FC	Darwin
19:00 ACST		Report	Sail 2' (o.g.); Rose 18'; Hollman 34'; Drew 80'	Stadium: Larrakia Park; Attendance: 1,446; Referee: Daniel Elder

== Statistics ==
=== Appearances and goals ===
Includes all competitions. Players with no appearances not included in the list.

As of 28 April 2024

No.	Pos.	Nat.	Name	A-League Men		Australia Cup		Total	
No.	Pos.	Nat.	Name	Apps	Goals	Apps	Goals	Apps	Goals
1	GK	(New Zealand)	Oliver Sail	17	0	1	0	18	0
2	DF	(Australia)	John Koutroumbis	21+3	0	1	0	25	0
3	DF	(Australia)	Jacob Muir	10+5	0	0	0	15	0
4	DF	(Australia)	Luke Bodnar	0+6	0	0	0	6	0
5	DF	(England)	Mark Beevers	10	1	0	0	10	1
7	FW	(North Macedonia)	Stefan Colakovski	15+7	6	1	0	23	6
8	MF	(Australia)	Mustafa Amini	11+6	2	0	0	17	2
9	FW	(Australia)	David Williams	3+22	5	0+1	0	26	5
11	FW	(Australia)	Adam Zimarino	0+2	0	0	0	2	0
13	GK	(Australia)	Cameron Cook	10	0	0	0	10	0
14	DF	(Australia)	Riley Warland	14+3	0	0	0	17	0
15	DF	(Australia)	Aleksandar Šušnjar	21	2	0	0	21	2
16	DF	(Australia)	Joshua Rawlins	8+4	1	0	0	12	1
17	FW	(Australia)	Jarrod Carluccio	11+12	1	0	0	23	1
19	MF	(Australia)	Trent Ostler	3+19	0	1	0	23	0
20	MF	(Australia)	Giordano Colli	27	0	1	0	28	0
22	FW	(Australia)	Adam Taggart	25	20	1	0	26	20
23	FW	(Australia)	Daniel Bennie	22+3	1	0+1	0	26	1
27	FW	(Australia)	Jayden Gorman	1+4	0	0	0	5	0
28	DF	(Australia)	Kaelan Majekodunmi	7+3	2	0+1	0	11	2
29	DF	(Curaçao)	Darryl Lachman	22+1	0	1	0	24	0
31	FW	(South Sudan)	Joel Anasmo	1+10	1	0+1	0	12	1
34	DF	(Australia)	Andriano Lebib	0+1	0	0	0	1	0
36	MF	(Vietnam)	Khoa Ngo	0+2	0	0	0	2	0
77	FW	(Australia)	Bruce Kamau	11+9	0	0	0	20	0
Player(s) transferred out but featured this season
6	MF	(Republic of Ireland)	Aaron McEneff	0+2	0	1	0	3	0
10	MF	(Tunisia)	Salim Khelifi	9+1	1	1	0	11	1
12	FW	(Australia)	Luke Ivanovic	9+4	1	0+1	0	14	1
15	DF	(Australia)	Jordan Elsey	0	0	1	0	1	0
16	DF	(Australia)	Joseph Forde	0	0	1	0	1	0
24	MF	(Australia)	Oliver Bozanic	9	1	0	0	9	1

=== Disciplinary record ===
Includes all competitions. The list is sorted by squad number when total cards are equal. Players with no cards not included in the list.

As of 28 April 2024

Rank	No.	Pos.	Nat.	Name	A-League Men			Australia Cup			Total		
Rank	No.	Pos.	Nat.	Name	Yellow card	(yellow card) (yellow-red card)	Red card	Yellow card	(yellow card) (yellow-red card)	Red card	Yellow card	(yellow card) (yellow-red card)	Red card
1	15	DF	(Australia)	Aleksandar Šušnjar	6	1	0	0	0	0	6	1	0
2	77	FW	(Australia)	Bruce Kamau	1	1	0	0	0	0	1	1	0
3	5	DF	(England)	Mark Beevers	0	1	0	0	0	0	0	1	0
4	20	MF	(Australia)	Giordano Colli	7	0	0	0	0	0	7	0	0
5	8	MF	(Australia)	Mustafa Amini	6	0	0	0	0	0	6	0	0
6	7	FW	(North Macedonia)	Stefan Colakovski	5	0	0	0	0	0	5	0	0
6	17	FW	(Australia)	Jarrod Carluccio	5	0	0	0	0	0	5	0	0
8	2	DF	(Australia)	John Koutroumbis	4	0	0	0	0	0	4	0	0
8	22	FW	(Australia)	Adam Taggart	3	0	0	0	0	0	3	0	0
10	16	DF	(Australia)	Joshua Rawlins	3	0	0	0	0	0	3	0	0
11	1	GK	(New Zealand)	Oliver Sail	1	0	0	0	0	0	1	0	0
11	3	DF	(Australia)	Jacob Muir	1	0	0	0	0	0	1	0	0
11	9	FW	(Australia)	David Williams	1	0	0	0	0	0	1	0	0
11	13	GK	(Australia)	Cameron Cook	1	0	0	0	0	0	1	0	0
11	14	DF	(Australia)	Riley Warland	1	0	0	0	0	0	1	0	0
11	19	MF	(Australia)	Trent Ostler	1	0	0	0	0	0	1	0	0
11	28	DF	(Australia)	Kaelan Majekodunmi	1	0	0	0	0	0	1	0	0
Player(s) transferred out but featured this season
1	10	MF	(Tunisia)	Salim Khelifi	1	0	0	0	0	0	1	0	0
1	12	FW	(Australia)	Luke Ivanovic	1	0	0	0	0	0	1	0	0
Total					50	3	0	0	0	0	50	3	0

=== Clean sheets ===
Includes all competitions. The list is sorted by squad number when total clean sheets are equal. Numbers in parentheses represent games where both goalkeepers participated and both kept a clean sheet; the number in parentheses is awarded to the goalkeeper who was substituted on, whilst a full clean sheet is awarded to the goalkeeper who was on the field at the start of play. Goalkeepers with no clean sheets not included in the list.

As of 28 April 2024

Rank	No.	Nat.	Goalkeeper	A-League Men	Australia Cup	Total
1	1	(New Zealand)	Oliver Sail	1	0	1
1	13	(Australia)	Cameron Cook	1	0	1
Total				2	0	2

== See also ==
- 2023–24 Perth Glory FC (A-League Women) season
