= 2022–23 Perth Glory FC season =

Perth Glory
2022–23 season
- Chairman: Tony Sage
- Manager: Ruben Zadkovich
- Stadium: Macedonia Park; HBF Park
- A-League Men: 9th
- A-League Men Finals: DNQ
- Top goalscorer: League: Adam Taggart; David Williams (5 each); All: Adam Taggart; David Williams (5 each)
- Highest home attendance: 7,890 vs. Western Sydney Wanderers (10 March 2023); A-League Men
- Lowest home attendance: 3,492 vs. Brisbane Roar (10 January 2023); A-League Men
- Average home league attendance: 4,451
- Biggest win: 3–1 vs. Melbourne Victory (H) (21 January 2023)
- Biggest defeat: 0–4 vs. Melbourne City (A) (5 November 2022)
- All statistics correct as of 29 April 2023.

The 2022–23 season was the 26th in the history of Perth Glory Football Club and 18th in the A-League Men.

== Players ==
Note: Flags indicate national team as defined under FIFA eligibility rules; some limited exceptions apply. Players may hold more than one non-FIFA nationality.

No.	Pos.	Nation	Player
1	GK	AUS	Brad Jones
2	DF	AUS	Johnny Koutroumbis
3	MF	AUS	Jacob Dowse (scholarship)
4	DF	AUS	Luke Bodnar
5	DF	ENG	Mark Beevers
6	MF	IRL	Aaron McEneff
7	FW	AUS	Ryan Williams
8	MF	AUS	Mustafa Amini (captain)
10	MF	TUN	Salim Khelifi (injury replacement)
12	FW	AUS	Luke Ivanovic
13	GK	AUS	Cameron Cook
14	DF	AUS	Jack Clisby
15	DF	AUS	Jordan Elsey
16	MF	AUS	Keegan Jelacic
18	FW	AUS	David Williams
19	MF	AUS	Zach Duncan (on loan from AGF)
20	MF	AUS	Giordano Colli

No.	Pos.	Nation	Player
21	MF	AUS	Antonee Burke-Gilroy
22	FW	AUS	Adam Taggart
23	MF	AUS	Mitchell Oxborrow
24	MF	ESP	Adrián Sardinero
25	MF	AUS	Matt Hatch
27	DF	AUS	Jacob Young (scholarship)
28	MF	AUS	Trent Ostler (scholarship)
29	DF	CUW	Darryl Lachman
30	GK	AUS	Pierce Clark (injury replacement)
31	MF	AUS	Chris Donnell (scholarship)
32	DF	AUS	Kaelan Majekodunmi (scholarship)
36	DF	AUS	Joseph Forde
37	DF	AUS	Jacob Muir
43	FW	AUS	Adam Zimarino (scholarship)
44	MF	AUS	Jaylan Pearman (scholarship)
77	FW	MKD	Stefan Colakovski

== Transfers ==
=== Transfers in ===
No.	Position	Player	Transferred from	Type/fee	Contract length	Date	Ref.
77	FW	(North Macedonia) Stefan Colakovski	Unattached	Free transfer	2 years	7 June 2022	
25	DF	Matt Hatch	Unattached	Free transfer	2 years	8 June 2022	
16	MF	(New Zealand) Keegan Jelacic	(Australia) Olympic FC	Free transfer	2 years	9 June 2022	
8	MF	Mustafa Amini	Unattached	Free transfer	3 years	10 June 2022	
7	MF	Ryan Williams	(England) Oxford United	Undisclosed	3 years	16 June 2022	
5	DF	(England) Mark Beevers	(England) Peterborough United	Free transfer	2 years	22 June 2022	
11	FW	(Israel) Ben Azubel	(Israel) Hapoel Ra'anana	Undisclosed	2 years	4 July 2022	
6	MF	(Republic of Ireland) Aaron McEneff	(Scotland) Heart of Midlothian	Undisclosed	3 years	19 July 2022	
2	DF	John Koutroumbis	Western Sydney Wanderers	Free transfer	2 years	29 July 2022	
18	FW	David Williams	Unattached	Free transfer	1 year	25 August 2022	
19	MF	Zach Duncan	(Denmark) AGF	Loan	1 year	6 September 2022	
3	MF	Jacob Dowse	(Australia) Broadmeadow Magic	Free transfer	1 year (scholarship)	7 September 2022	
12	FW	Luke Ivanovic	Brisbane Roar	Free transfer	2 years	14 September 2022	
10	MF	(Tunisia) Salim Khelifi	Unattached	Free transfer	Injury replacement for Adrián Sardinero (1 year)	15 September 2022	
30	GK	Pierce Clark	Unattached	Free transfer	Injury replacement for Brad Jones	5 October 2022	
22	FW	Adam Taggart	(Japan) Cerezo Osaka	Undisclosed	3.5 years	15 December 2022	
15	DF	Jordan Elsey	Newcastle Jets	Free transfer	2.5 years	23 January 2023	

==== From youth squad ====
N	Pos.	Nat.	Name	Age	Notes
37	DF	(Australia)	Jacob Muir	20	1 year scholarship
43	FW	(Australia)	Adam Zimarino	20	1 year scholarship
31	MF	(Australia)	Chris Donnell	18	1.5 year scholarship
32	DF	(Australia)	Kaelan Majekodunmi	19	2.5 year scholarship
44	MF	(Australia)	Jaylan Pearman	17	scholarship

=== Transfers out ===
No.	Position	Player	Transferred to	Type/fee	Date	Ref.
10	FW	(Republic of Ireland) Andy Keogh	Retired		21 April 2022	
22	DF	Joshua Rawlins	(Netherlands) Utrecht	Free transfer	5 May 2022	
5	DF	Jonathan Aspropotamitis	Unattached	Mutual contract termination	3 June 2022	
6	DF	Osama Malik	Unattached	End of contract	3 June 2022	
11	FW	Nick Fitzgerald	Unattached	End of contract	3 June 2022	
15	FW	(England) Daniel Sturridge	Unattached	End of contract	3 June 2022	
16	DF	(Serbia) Darko Stanojević	Unattached	End of contract	3 June 2022	
13	MF	Brandon O'Neill	Newcastle Jets	Mutual contract termination	10 June 2022	
31	DF	Daniel Walsh	(Australia) Gwelup Croatia	End of contract	25 June 2022	
8	DF	(Japan) Kosuke Ota	Unattached	Mutual contract termination	7 July 2022	
18	MF	Daniel Stynes	Newcastle Jets	Mutual contract termination	29 July 2022	
19	MF	Callum Timmins	Newcastle Jets	Mutual contract termination	29 July 2022	
20	FW	Carlo Armiento	Brisbane Roar	Mutual contract termination	14 September 2022	
9	FW	Bruno Fornaroli	Unattached	Mutual contract termination	28 October 2022	
38	FW	Ciaran Bramwell	(Australia) Melbourne Knights	End of contract	15 November 2022	
24	FW	(Burundi) Pacifique Niyongabire	(Canada) Valour FC	Mutual contract termination	15 December 2022	
11	FW	(Israel) Ben Azubel	(Thailand) BG Pathum United	Mutual contract termination	24 December 2022	
33	GK	Liam Reddy	Unattached	Mutual contract termination	29 March 2023	

=== Contract extensions ===
No.	Name	Position	Duration	Date	Notes and references
29	(Curaçao) Darryl Lachman	Centre-back	2 years	20 May 2022	
4	Luke Bodnar	Defensive Midfielder	3 years	8 June 2022	
12	Cameron Cook	Goalkeeper	2 years	8 June 2022	
36	Joseph Forde	Left-back	2 years	8 June 2022	
26	Giordano Colli	Centre Midfielder	2 years	15 June 2022	
25	Jacob Young	Centre-back	1 years	29 June 2022	scholarship
23	Mitchell Oxborrow	Defensive Midfielder	1 year	6 July 2022	
28	Trent Ostler	Striker	2 years	6 July 2022	scholarship
10	(Tunisia) Salim Khelifi	Winger	2 years	30 December 2022	
16	(New Zealand) Keegan Jelacic	Attacking midfielder	1 year	8 February 2023	Contract extended from end of 2023–24 until end of 2024–25.
37	Jacob Muir	Defender	2 years	10 February 2023	
12	Cameron Cook	Goalkeeper	3 years	7 March 2023	Signed new contract until end of 2025–26.

== Technical staff ==
Position	Name
Head coach	(Australia) Ruben Zadkovich
Senior Assistant coach	(England) Joe Gallen
Assistant coach	(Australia) Chris Coyne
Technical Consultant	(England) Mich d'Avray
Head of Recruitment	(Republic of Ireland) Andy Keogh
Academy Director	(England) Kenny Lowe

== Pre-season and friendlies ==
10 August 2022	Perth SC (Australia)	1–4	Perth Glory	Perth
19:00 AWST	? 41' (pen.)	Report	Colakovski 2'; R. Williams 31'; Hatch 50'; Niyongabire (?)	Stadium: Dorrien Gardens

1 September 2022	Inglewood United (Australia)	0–0	Perth Glory	Perth
19:00 AWST		Report		Stadium: Inglewood Stadium; Referee: Shane Skinner

8 September 2022	Central Coast Mariners	0–0	Perth Glory	Gosford
		Report		Stadium: Central Coast Stadium; Attendance: 0 (behind closed doors)

13 September 2022	Gold Coast Knights (Australia)	0–4	Perth Glory	Gold Coast
18:30 AEST		Report	Williams 46'; Azubel 73'; Hatch 75'; Zimarino 88'	Stadium: Croatian Sports Centre

25 September 2022 Gold Fields Challenge Cup	WA State Team (Western Australia)	0–6	Perth Glory	Perth
15:00		Report	Azubel 15' (pen.), 30'; Zimarino 41', 53'; Jelacic 75'; Colli 82'	Stadium: Kingsway Reserve; Referee: Shane Skinner

== Competitions ==
Win Draw Loss

=== Overall record ===
Competition	First match	Last match	Starting round	Final position	Record							
Competition	First match	Last match	Starting round	Final position	Pld	W	D	L	GF	GA	GD	Win %
A-League Men	9 October 2022	29 April 2023	Matchday 1	9th	26	7	8	11	36	46	−10	26.92
Total					26	7	8	11	36	46	−10	26.92

Last updated: 29 April 2023
Source: Competitions

=== A-League Men ===
==== League table ====
Pos	Team	Pld	W	D	L	GF	GA	GD	Pts	Qualification
7	Western United	26	9	5	12	34	47	−13	32	
8	Brisbane Roar	26	7	9	10	26	33	−7	30	
9	Perth Glory	26	7	8	11	36	46	−10	29	Qualification for 2023 Australia Cup play-offs
10	Newcastle Jets	26	8	5	13	30	45	−15	29	Qualification for 2023 Australia Cup play-offs
11	Melbourne Victory	26	8	4	14	29	34	−5	28	Qualification for 2023 Australia Cup play-offs

Source: A-Leagues
Rules for classification: 1) Points; 2) Goal difference; 3) Goals scored; 4) Points per game; 5) Least red cards; 6) Least yellow cards; 7) Toss of a coin in an event of a tie of two clubs.

==== Results summary ====
Overall								Home						Away					
Pld	W	D	L	GF	GA	GD	Pts	W	D	L	GF	GA	GD	W	D	L	GF	GA	GD
26	7	8	11	36	46	−10	29	6	5	2	25	21	+4	1	3	9	11	25	−14

Last updated: 29 April 2023.
Source: ultimatealeague.com

==== Results by round ====
Round	1	2	3	4	5	7	8	9	10	11	6	12	13	14	15	16	17	18	19	20	21	22	23	24	25	26
Ground	A	A	A	A	A	H	A	H	A	H	H	H	H	A	H	H	H	A	A	H	A	H	A	A	H	H
Result	L	L	W	L	L	W	L	D	L	W	W	D	W	D	D	L	D	L	L	W	D	W	D	L	D	L
Position	11	11	7	10	11	7	10	12	12	9	10	9	7	7	7	9	9	10	11	10	10	7	7	9	7	9
Points	0	0	3	3	3	6	6	7	7	10	13	14	17	18	19	19	20	20	20	23	24	27	28	28	29	29

Updated to match(es) played on 29 April 2023. Source: Ultimate A-League
A = Away; H = Home; W = Win; D = Draw; L = Loss

==== Matches ====
9 October 2022 1	Western Sydney Wanderers	1–0	Perth Glory	Sydney
15:00 AEDT	Krpić 78'	Report		Stadium: CommBank Stadium; Attendance: 8,984; Referee: Kurt Ams

15 October 2022 2	Newcastle Jets	2–1	Perth Glory	Newcastle
17:00 AEDT	Elsey 59'; Mikeltadze 90+3'	Report	McEneff 73' (pen.)	Stadium: McDonald Jones Stadium; Attendance: 7,089; Referee: Daniel Elder

23 October 2022 3	Central Coast Mariners	1–2	Perth Glory	Gosford
17:00 AEDT	Silvera 21'	Report	Colli 43'; McEneff 56'	Stadium: Industree Group Stadium; Attendance: 5,619; Referee: Lachlan Keevers

30 October 2022 4	Adelaide United	2–1	Perth Glory	Adelaide
15:00 AEDT	Goodwin 18'; Ibusuki 22'	Report	Colli 32'	Stadium: Coopers Stadium; Attendance: 7,183; Referee: Alireza Faghani

5 November 2022 5	Melbourne City	4–0	Perth Glory	Melbourne
17:00 AEDT	Maclaren 49', 75' (pen.); Tilio 82'; Leckie 90+5'	Report		Stadium: AAMI Park; Attendance: 6,171; Referee: Jack Morgan

Mid-season break for 2022 FIFA World Cup

10 December 2022 7	Perth Glory	2–1	Western United	Perth
19:30 AWST	R. Williams 14'; Clisby 52'	Report	Kilkenny 83'	Stadium: Macedonia Park; Attendance: 3,893; Referee: Daniel Elder

18 December 2022 8	Macarthur FC	1–0	Perth Glory	Campbelltown
17:00 AEDT	Arabuli 71'	Report		Stadium: Campbelltown Stadium; Attendance: 2,826; Referee: Tim Danaskos

23 December 2022 9	Perth Glory	1–1	Wellington Phoenix	Perth
19:30 AWST	D. Williams 22'	Report	Zawada 31'	Stadium: Macedonia Park; Attendance: 3,977; Referee: Casey Reibelt

2 January 2023 10	Adelaide United	2–0	Perth Glory	Adelaide
19:45 AEDT	Barr 40'; Halloran 72'	Report		Stadium: Coopers Stadium; Attendance: 10,024; Referee: Jonathan Barreiro

6 January 2023 11	Perth Glory	1–0	Western Sydney Wanderers	Perth
19:30 AWST	Jelacic 59'	Report		Stadium: Macedonia Park; Attendance: 3,912; Referee: Jack Morgan

10 January 2023 6	Perth Glory	2–1	Brisbane Roar	Perth
19:30 AWST	Lachman 34'; Neville 60' (o.g.)	Report	Chapman 56'	Stadium: Macedonia Park; Attendance: 3,492; Referee: Ben Abraham

14 January 2023 12	Perth Glory	2–2	Sydney FC	Perth
19:30 AWST	Duncan 46'; D. Williams 90+12'	Report	Lolley 6'; Grant 26'	Stadium: Macedonia Park; Attendance: 3,912; Referee: Alex King

21 January 2023 13	Perth Glory	3–1	Melbourne Victory	Perth
19:30 AWST	R. Williams 37'; Taggart 80', 87'	Report	Brillante 69'	Stadium: Macedonia Park; Attendance: 3,989; Referee: Stephen Lucas

28 January 2023 14	Wellington Phoenix	2–2	Perth Glory	Palmerston North
13:00 AEDT	Zawada 11'; Barbarouses 20'	Report	Williams 22', 80'	Stadium: Central Energy Trust Arena; Attendance: 4,518; Referee: Lachlan Keevers

4 February 2023 15	Perth Glory	2–2	Newcastle Jets	Perth
19:30 AWST	Bodnar 44'; Beevers 79'	Report	Piscopo 59'; Goodwin 88'	Stadium: Macedonia Park; Attendance: 3,858; Referee: Shaun Evans

11 February 2023 16	Perth Glory	2–4	Melbourne City	Perth
19:30 AWST	Clisby 25'; D. Williams 71'	Report	Bos 16'; Berisha 62' (pen.); Leckie 76'; Berenguer 90+2'	Stadium: Macedonia Park; Attendance: 3,991; Referee: Daniel Elder

18 February 2023 17	Perth Glory	2–2	Central Coast Mariners	Perth
19:00 AWST	Khelifi 16', 51' (pen.)	Report	Cummings 74' (pen.), 81' (pen.)	Stadium: Macedonia Park; Attendance: 3,887; Referee: Adam Kersey

26 February 2023 18	Brisbane Roar	2–1	Perth Glory	Brisbane
17:00 AEDT	Aldred 28'; Hore 45'	Report	Clisby 19'	Stadium: Kayo Stadium; Attendance: 4,653; Referee: Alireza Faghani

4 March 2023 19	Western United	2–1	Perth Glory	Ballarat
17:00 AEDT	Botic 42'; Doumbia 45'	Report	Elsey 22'	Stadium: Mars Stadium; Attendance: 2,586; Referee: Jonathan Barreiro

10 March 2023 20	Perth Glory	1–0	Western Sydney Wanderers	Perth
19:00 AWST	McEneff 90+5'	Report		Stadium: HBF Park; Attendance: 7,890; Referee: Alex King

18 March 2023 21	Newcastle Jets	2–2	Perth Glory	Newcastle
17:00 AEDT	Buhagiar 36'; Grozos 79'	Report	McEneff 52'; R. Williams 90+7'	Stadium: McDonald Jones Stadium; Attendance: 4,864; Referee: Adam Bavcar

1 April 2023 22	Perth Glory	2–1	Macarthur FC	Perth
19:00 AWST	Taggart 69'; Beevers 74'	Report	Rose 43'	Stadium: Macedonia Park; Attendance: 3,896; Referee: Daniel Cook

9 April 2023 23	Melbourne Victory	0–0	Perth Glory	Melbourne
15:00 AEST		Report		Stadium: AAMI Park; Attendance: 5,012; Referee: Daniel Elder

16 April 2023 24	Sydney FC	4–1	Perth Glory	Sydney
15:00 AEST	Le Fondre 8'; Lolley 51'; Mak 62'; Grant 72'	Report	Zimarino 44'	Stadium: Allianz Stadium; Attendance: 12,850; Referee: Shaun Evans

23 April 2023 25	Perth Glory	4–4	Adelaide United	Perth
16:00 AWST	Williams 32'; Taggart 60', 90+6'; Zimarino 90+3'	Report	Jovanovic 34'; Goodwin 51'; Kitto 78'; Irankunda 90+9'	Stadium: HBF Park; Attendance: 6,083; Referee: Jack Morgan

29 April 2023 26	Perth Glory	1–2	Western United	Perth
20:00 AWST	Jelacic 45'	Report	Garuccio 25'; Botic 53'	Stadium: HBF Park; Attendance: 5,088; Referee: Daniel Elder

== Statistics ==
=== Appearances and goals ===
Includes all competitions. Players with no appearances not included in the list.

As of 29 April 2023

No.	Pos.	Nat.	Name	A-League Men		Total	
No.	Pos.	Nat.	Name	Apps	Goals	Apps	Goals
2	DF	(Australia)	John Koutroumbis	11+5	0	16	0
3	MF	(Australia)	Jacob Dowse	1+16	0	17	0
4	DF	(Australia)	Luke Bodnar	13+7	1	20	1
5	DF	(England)	Mark Beevers	24	2	24	2
6	MF	(Republic of Ireland)	Aaron McEneff	10+3	3	13	3
7	MF	(Australia)	Ryan Williams	24	4	24	4
8	MF	(Australia)	Mustafa Amini	19	0	19	0
10	MF	(Tunisia)	Salim Khelifi	14	2	14	2
12	FW	(Australia)	Luke Ivanovic	4+7	0	11	0
13	GK	(Australia)	Cameron Cook	17	0	17	0
14	DF	(Australia)	Jack Clisby	21	3	21	3
15	DF	(Australia)	Jordan Elsey	10	1	10	1
16	MF	(Australia)	Keegan Jelacic	21+1	2	22	2
18	FW	(Australia)	David Williams	10+8	5	18	5
19	MF	(Australia)	Zach Duncan	8+16	1	24	1
20	MF	(Australia)	Giordano Colli	4+7	2	11	2
21	MF	(Australia)	Antonee Burke-Gilroy	5+4	0	9	0
22	FW	(Australia)	Adam Taggart	9+4	5	13	5
23	MF	(Australia)	Mitchell Oxborrow	2+3	0	5	0
25	MF	(Australia)	Matt Hatch	0+3	0	3	0
28	FW	(Australia)	Trent Ostler	4+5	1	9	1
29	DF	(Curaçao)	Darryl Lachman	25	1	25	1
31	MF	(Australia)	Chris Donnell	0+1	0	1	0
36	DF	(Australia)	Joseph Forde	3+8	0	11	0
37	DF	(Australia)	Jacob Muir	11+2	0	13	0
43	FW	(Australia)	Adam Zimarino	2+14	2	16	2
77	FW	(North Macedonia)	Stefan Colakovski	0+2	0	2	0
Player(s) transferred out but featured this season
9	FW	(Australia)	Bruno Fornaroli	2	0	2	0
11	FW	(Israel)	Ben Azubel	4+2	0	6	0
33	GK	(Australia)	Liam Reddy	9	0	9	0

=== Disciplinary record ===
Includes all competitions. The list is sorted by squad number when total cards are equal. Players with no cards not included in the list.

As of 29 April 2023

Rank	No.	Pos.	Nat.	Name	A-League Men			Total		
Rank	No.	Pos.	Nat.	Name	Booked	(yellow card) (yellow-red card)	Sent off (straight red)	Booked	(yellow card) (yellow-red card)	Sent off (straight red)
1	29	DF	(Curaçao)	Darryl Lachman	4	0	1	4	0	1
2	14	DF	(Australia)	Jack Clisby	2	0	1	2	0	1
2	15	DF	(Australia)	Jordan Elsey	2	0	1	2	0	1
4	5	DF	(England)	Mark Beevers	5	2	0	5	2	0
5	8	MF	(Australia)	Mustafa Amini	6	0	0	6	0	0
5	7	MF	(Australia)	Ryan Williams	6	0	0	6	0	0
7	4	DF	(Australia)	Luke Bodnar	4	0	0	4	0	0
7	16	MF	(New Zealand)	Keegan Jelacic	4	0	0	4	0	0
7	19	MF	(Australia)	Zach Duncan	4	0	0	4	0	0
10	18	FW	(Australia)	David Williams	3	0	0	3	0	0
10	21	MF	(Australia)	Antonee Burke-Gilroy	3	0	0	3	0	0
10	36	DF	(Australia)	Joseph Forde	3	0	0	3	0	0
10	37	DF	(Australia)	Jacob Muir	3	0	0	3	0	0
14	2	DF	(Australia)	John Koutroumbis	2	0	0	2	0	0
14	13	GK	(Australia)	Cameron Cook	2	0	0	2	0	0
14	22	FW	(Australia)	Adam Taggart	2	0	0	2	0	0
17	3	MF	(Australia)	Jacob Dowse	1	0	0	1	0	0
17	6	MF	(Republic of Ireland)	Aaron McEneff	1	0	0	1	0	0
17	10	MF	(Tunisia)	Salim Khelifi	1	0	0	1	0	0
17	25	MF	(Australia)	Matt Hatch	1	0	0	1	0	0
17	43	FW	(Australia)	Adam Zimarino	1	0	0	1	0	0
Player(s) transferred out but featured this season
1	11	FW	(Israel)	Ben Azubel	1	0	0	1	0	0
Total					61	2	3	61	2	3

=== Clean sheets ===
Includes all competitions. The list is sorted by squad number when total clean sheets are equal. Numbers in parentheses represent games where both goalkeepers participated and both kept a clean sheet; the number in parentheses is awarded to the goalkeeper who was substituted on, whilst a full clean sheet is awarded to the goalkeeper who was on the field at the start and end of play. Goalkeepers with no clean sheets not included in the list.

As of 29 April 2023

Rank	No.	Nat.	Goalkeeper	A-League Men	Total
1	1	(Australia)	Cameron Cook	3	3
Total				3	3
