= A-League Men transfers for 2023–24 season =

Australian soccer season transfers

This is a list of Australian soccer transfers for the 2023–24 A-League Men. Only moves featuring at least one A-League Men club are listed.

Clubs were able to sign players at any time, but many transfers will only officially go through on 1 June because the majority of player contracts finish on 31 May.

== Transfers ==
All players without a flag are Australian. Clubs without a flag are clubs participating in the A-League Men.

=== Pre-season ===
Date	Name	Moving from	Moving to
9 March 2023	(New Zealand) Oliver Sail	Wellington Phoenix	Perth Glory
3 April 2023	Daniel Wilmering	Western Sydney Wanderers	Newcastle Jets
3 April 2023	Jack Warshawsky	Western Sydney Wanderers	Central Coast Mariners
19 April 2023	Nikolai Topor-Stanley	Western United	Retired
24 April 2023	(Italy) Alessandro Diamanti	Western United	Retired
4 May 2023	Lleyton Brooks	Melbourne Victory	Unattached
4 May 2023	(Spain) Cadete	Melbourne Victory	Unattached
4 May 2023	Tomi Juric	Melbourne Victory	Unattached
6 May 2023	(Georgia (country)) Beka Mikeltadze	Newcastle Jets	Unattached
6 May 2023	(Japan) Manabu Saitō	Newcastle Jets	Unattached
8 May 2023	Adisu Bayew	Western United	Unattached
8 May 2023	Ben Collins	Western United	Unattached
8 May 2023	Ajak Deu	Western United	Unattached
8 May 2023	(Mali) Tongo Doumbia	Western United	Unattached
8 May 2023	Neil Kilkenny	Western United	Unattached
8 May 2023	(Switzerland) Léo Lacroix	Western United	Unattached
8 May 2023	James Troisi	Western United	Unattached
8 May 2023	(New Zealand) Clayton Lewis	Wellington Phoenix	Macarthur FC
10 May 2023	(New Zealand) Nikko Boxall	Wellington Phoenix	Unattached
10 May 2023	(New Zealand) Callan Elliot	Wellington Phoenix	Unattached
10 May 2023	Joshua Laws	Wellington Phoenix	Unattached
10 May 2023	Lucas Mauragis	Wellington Phoenix	Newcastle Jets (end of loan)
10 May 2023	(Brazil) Yan Sasse	Wellington Phoenix	Unattached
10 May 2023	(France) Morgan Schneiderlin	Western Sydney Wanderers	(France) Nice (end of loan)
11 May 2023	Josh Brindell-South	Brisbane Roar	Unattached
11 May 2023	(Austria) Marcel Canadi	Brisbane Roar	Unattached
11 May 2023	Jordan Courtney-Perkins	Brisbane Roar	(Poland) Raków Częstochowa (end of loan)
11 May 2023	Joe Knowles	Brisbane Roar	Unattached
11 May 2023	Robbie Kruse	Brisbane Roar	Unattached
11 May 2023	Mohamed Al-Taay	Newcastle Jets	Wellington Phoenix
16 May 2023	Jordan Bos	Melbourne City	(Belgium) Westerlo
16 May 2023	Jacob Dowse	Perth Glory	Newcastle Jets
16 May 2023	Jaushua Sotirio	Newcastle Jets	(India) Kerala Blasters
17 May 2023	Angus Thurgate	Newcastle Jets	Western United
18 May 2023	(Georgia (country)) Bachana Arabuli	Macarthur FC	Unattached
18 May 2023	(England) Craig Noone	Macarthur FC	Unattached
18 May 2023	(United States) Jason Romero	Macarthur FC	Unattached
18 May 2023	Nicholas Suman	Macarthur FC	Unattached
18 May 2023	Aleksandar Šušnjar	Macarthur FC	Unattached
23 May 2023	(Spain) Juande	Adelaide United	Unattached
24 May 2023	(France) Romain Amalfitano	Western Sydney Wanderers	Unattached
24 May 2023	(Democratic Republic of the Congo) Yeni Ngbakoto	Western Sydney Wanderers	Unattached
24 May 2023	Joel King	Sydney FC	(Denmark) OB (end of loan)
24 May 2023	Brad Jones	Perth Glory	Retired
25 May 2023	Bruce Kamau	Melbourne Victory	(Greece) OFI Crete (end of loan)
25 May 2023	(Paraguay) Fernando Romero	Melbourne Victory	(Paraguay) Cerro Porteño (end of loan)
28 May 2023	Scott Jamieson	Melbourne City	Retired
30 May 2023	Keegan Jelacic	Perth Glory	(Belgium) Gent
31 May 2023	(Portugal) Nani	Melbourne Victory	Unattached
1 June 2023	Alex Wilkinson	Sydney FC	Retired
7 June 2023	Jordan Holmes	Brisbane Roar	Unattached
8 June 2023	(Tunisia) Amor Layouni	Western Sydney Wanderers	(Norway) Vålerenga (end of loan)
8 June 2023	Ryan Scott	Western United	Newcastle Jets
8 June 2023	Nectarios Triantis	Central Coast Mariners	(England) Sunderland
9 June 2023	Jack Duncan	Newcastle Jets	Wellington Phoenix
9 June 2023	(Kosovo) Valon Berisha	Melbourne City	(France) Reims (end of loan)
9 June 2023	Kerrin Stokes	Melbourne City	Unattached
9 June 2023	Tom Glover	Melbourne City	Unattached
9 June 2023	Aiden O'Neill	Melbourne City	Unattached
9 June 2023	Daniel De Silva	Macarthur FC	Unattached
9 June 2023	Moudi Najjar	Macarthur FC	Unattached
9 June 2023	Al Hassan Toure	Macarthur FC	Unattached
12 June 2023	(England) Adam Le Fondre	Sydney FC	Unattached
13 June 2023	(Finland) Thomas Lam	Melbourne City	Unattached
13 June 2023	(Netherlands) Richard van der Venne	Melbourne City	Unattached
14 June 2023	Tom Heward-Belle	Sydney FC	Western United
14 June 2023	Matt Sutton	Melbourne City	Western United
14 June 2023	Antonee Burke-Gilroy	Perth Glory	Unattached
14 June 2023	Pierce Clark	Perth Glory	Unattached
14 June 2023	Zach Duncan	Perth Glory	(Denmark) AGF (end of loan)
14 June 2023	Matt Hatch	Perth Glory	Unattached
14 June 2023	Mitchell Oxborrow	Perth Glory	Unattached
14 June 2023	(Spain) Adrián Sardinero	Perth Glory	Unattached
14 June 2023	Jacob Young	Perth Glory	Unattached
14 June 2023	Rhys Williams	Western Sydney Wanderers	Retired
14 June 2023	Patrick Beach	Central Coast Mariners Academy	Melbourne City
14 June 2023	Joshua Hong	Central Coast Mariners	Western Sydney Wanderers NPL
15 June 2023	(Germany) Tolgay Arslan	(Italy) Udinese	Melbourne City
15 June 2023	Lachlan Brook	Unattached	Western Sydney Wanderers
16 June 2023	Clayton Taylor	Sydney FC NPL	Newcastle Jets
17 June 2023	Yaren Sözer	Central Coast Mariners	Unattached
19 June 2023	Anthony Pavlesic	Central Coast Mariners	(Germany) Bayern Munich
22 June 2023	Dylan Pierias	Western United	Western Sydney Wanderers
22 June 2023	Nathan Paull	Sydney FC NPL	Central Coast Mariners
23 June 2023	Alessandro Lopane	Western Sydney Wanderers	Melbourne City
23 June 2023	Zane Schreiber	Sydney FC NPL	Melbourne City
23 June 2023	Joel King	(Denmark) OB	Sydney FC
24 June 2023	Matthew Jurman	Newcastle Jets	Macarthur FC
24 June 2023	Olayinka Sunmola	Central Coast Mariners	(Australia) Mt Druitt Town Rangers
25 June 2023	Paulo Retre	Sydney FC	(India) Goa
26 June 2023	(Serbia) Stefan Šćepović	Brisbane Roar	Unattached
26 June 2023	Jack Clisby	Perth Glory	Western Sydney Wanderers
27 June 2023	Raphael Borges Rodrigues	Melbourne City	Macarthur FC
27 June 2023	Lachlan Bayliss	Central Coast Mariners	Newcastle Jets
28 June 2023	Jason Cummings	Central Coast Mariners	(India) Mohun Bagan
28 June 2023	(Afghanistan) Rahmat Akbari	Brisbane Roar	(Georgia (country)) Torpedo Kutaisi
30 June 2023	Steven Ugarkovic	Wellington Phoenix	Melbourne City
30 June 2023	(Sweden) Marcus Antonsson	Unattached	Western Sydney Wanderers
30 June 2023	George Timotheou	Melbourne Victory	(Australia) Gungahlin United
30 June 2023	Marco Tilio	Melbourne City	(Scotland) Celtic
2 July 2023	Kusini Yengi	Western Sydney Wanderers	(England) Portsmouth
3 July 2023	Alex Parsons	Sydney FC	Brisbane Roar
3 July 2023	Matt Acton	Melbourne Victory	Brisbane Roar
3 July 2023	Corey Brown	Unattached	Brisbane Roar
3 July 2023	Kristian Popovic	Unattached	Macarthur FC
4 July 2023	George Blackwood	Adelaide United	Unattached
4 July 2023	Asad Kasumovic	Adelaide United	Unattached
4 July 2023	James Donachie	Sydney FC	Western United
4 July 2023	(England) Jamie Young	Western United	Melbourne City
4 July 2023	Zac Bowling	(Australia) Altona Magic	Newcastle Jets
5 July 2023	Anthony Pantazopolous	(Australia) Oakleigh Cannons	Western Sydney Wanderers
5 July 2023	(Spain) Diego Caballo	Sydney FC	(Denmark) AaB
6 July 2023	Terry Antonis	Western Sydney Wanderers	Melbourne City
6 July 2023	Kane Vidmar	Adelaide United NPL	Western United
6 July 2023	Chris Donnell	Perth Glory	(England) Fulham
7 July 2023	Apostolos Stamatelopoulos	(Greece) PAS Giannina	Newcastle Jets
7 July 2023	Samuel Silvera	Central Coast Mariners	(England) Middlesbrough
8 July 2023	Connor Pain	Western United	(Saudi Arabia) Al-Orobah
8 July 2023	Luke Oresti	Melbourne City	Central Coast Mariners Academy
9 July 2023	Daniel Arzani	Macarthur FC	Melbourne Victory
9 July 2023	Joshua Brillante	Melbourne Victory	Western Sydney Wanderers
10 July 2023	(France) Samuel Souprayen	Unattached	Melbourne City
10 July 2023	Alou Kuol	(Germany) VfB Stuttgart	Central Coast Mariners
11 July 2023	Daniel De Silva	Unattached	Macarthur FC
12 July 2023	(Ghana) Paul Ayongo	Central Coast Mariners	(Luxembourg) Swift Hesperange
13 July 2023	(Ivory Coast) Adama Traoré	Western Sydney Wanderers	Melbourne Victory
13 July 2023	Doni Grdić	(Croatia) Šibenik	Western Sydney Wanderers
14 July 2023	(France) Valère Germain	Unattached	Macarthur FC
14 July 2023	Jing Reec	(Denmark) AGF	Central Coast Mariners (loan)
17 July 2023	Oscar Priestman	Sydney FC NPL	Western Sydney Wanderers
18 July 2023	Nathan Amanatidis	Adelaide United NPL	Sydney FC
19 July 2023	(Brazil) Daniel Penha	(Brazil) Atlético Mineiro	Western United (loan)
22 July 2023	Calem Nieuwenhof	Western Sydney Wanderers	(Scotland) Heart of Midlothian
24 July 2023	(Japan) Riku Danzaki	(Scotland) Motherwell	Western United
25 July 2023	Tomislav Mrčela	Western Sydney Wanderers	(Uzbekistan) Neftchi Fergana
28 July 2023	Trent Millard	Brisbane Roar NPL	Central Coast Mariners
28 July 2023	Ryan Williams	Perth Glory	(India) Bengaluru
28 July 2023	Jordan Elsey	Perth Glory	(India) East Bengal
1 August 2023	(France) Béni Nkololo	Central Coast Mariners	(Saudi Arabia) Al-Orobah
2 August 2023	(Croatia) Marin Jakoliš	(France) Angers	Melbourne City (loan)
2 August 2023	Noah Smith	Brisbane Roar	Central Coast Mariners
2 August 2023	(Brazil) Mikael Doka	Unattached	Central Coast Mariners
3 August 2023	Joe Caletti	(Japan) Tochigi City	Brisbane Roar
6 August 2023	Aziz Behich	(Scotland) Dundee United	Melbourne City
8 August 2023	(France) Zinédine Machach	Unattached	Melbourne Victory
9 August 2023	(Brazil) Moresche	Central Coast Mariners	(Iraq) Naft Al-Basra
9 August 2023	Ruon Tongyik	(Iran) Mes Kerman	Western Sydney Wanderers (end of loan)
10 August 2023	Danijel Nizic	(Australia) Sydney United 58	Macarthur FC
11 August 2023	(France) Florin Berenguer	Melbourne City	Brisbane Roar
11 August 2023	(New Zealand) James McGarry	Central Coast Mariners	(Scotland) Aberdeen
17 August 2023	(Morocco) Hamza Sakhi	(France) Auxerre	Melbourne City (loan)
26 August 2023	William Wilson	Melbourne Victory	Central Coast Mariners
29 August 2023	(France) Jason Berthomier	(France) Valenciennes	Newcastle Jets
30 August 2023	(Colombia) Ángel Torres	Unattached	Central Coast Mariners
30 August 2023	Adrian Segecic	Sydney FC	(Netherlands) Dordrecht (loan)
1 September 2023	Aleksandar Šušnjar	(Serbia) Novi Pazar	Perth Glory
3 September 2023	(Malta) Dylan Scicluna	(England) Wolverhampton Wanderers	Western Sydney Wanderers
4 September 2023	Bruce Kamau	Unattached	Perth Glory
4 September 2023	Fabian Monge	(Australia) APIA Leichhardt	Melbourne Victory
6 September 2023	Louis D'Arrigo	Adelaide United	(Poland) Lechia Gdańsk
8 September 2023	Craig Goodwin	Adelaide United	(Saudi Arabia) Al Wehda
12 September 2023	Riley Warland	(Australia) Perth RedStar	Perth Glory
12 September 2023	(Brazil) Fábio Gomes	(Brazil) Atlético Mineiro	Sydney FC (loan)
12 September 2023	Yianni Nicolaou	(Australia) APIA Leichhardt	Macarthur FC
12 September 2023	Nathan Grimaldi	(Australia) Sutherland Sharks	Newcastle Jets
12 September 2023	Justin Vidic	(Australia) Marconi Stallions	Newcastle Jets
13 September 2023	Oliver Bozanic	Western Sydney Wanderers	Perth Glory (loan)
13 September 2023	Ryan Teague	(Portugal) Famalicão	Melbourne Victory
13 September 2023	Jarrod Carluccio	Western Sydney Wanderers	Perth Glory (loan)
15 September 2023	(Brazil) Léo Natel	(Brazil) Corinthians	Melbourne City (loan)
15 September 2023	(Cyprus) Antonis Martis	(Australia) Sutherland Sharks	Perth Glory
15 September 2023	Jordan Courtney-Perkins	(Poland) Raków Częstochowa	Sydney FC
16 September 2023	(Netherlands) Jorrit Hendrix	Unattached	Western Sydney Wanderers
19 September 2023	(Brazil) Gabriel Lacerda	(Brazil) Ceará	Sydney FC (loan)
19 September 2023	Shae Cahill	Unattached	Brisbane Roar
19 September 2023	(England) Ryan Tunnicliffe	Unattached	Adelaide United
20 September 2023	Jonas Markovski	(Australia) Altona Magic	Brisbane Roar
20 September 2023	Aaron Reardon	(Australia) Gold Coast Knights	Brisbane Roar
27 September 2023	(Serbia) Aleksandar Prijović	Western United	Unattached
27 September 2023	Nikita Rukavytsya	Unattached	Western United

=== Mid-season ===
Date	Name	Moving from	Moving to
9 November 2023	Antonee Burke-Gilroy	Unattached	Brisbane Roar
20 November 2023	(Lebanon) Austin Ayoubi	(Australia) North Eastern MetroStars	Adelaide United
1 December 2023	(South Sudan) Valentino Yuel	Unattached	Western Sydney Wanderers
7 December 2023	Kealey Adamson	Sydney FC	Macarthur FC
14 December 2023	Eddie Caspers	Macarthur FC	(Australia) APIA Leichhardt
19 December 2023	Trent Millard	Central Coast Mariners	Unattached
26 December 2023	Dean Larson	Central Coast Mariners	Unattached
28 December 2023	Jonathan Aspropotamitis	Macarthur FC	(South Korea) Pohang Steelers
6 January 2024	(Brazil) Marco Túlio	Central Coast Mariners	(Japan) Kyoto Sanga
8 January 2024	Joseph Forde	Perth Glory	(Republic of Ireland) Waterford
10 January 2024	Aaron Reardon	Brisbane Roar	Unattached
11 January 2024	Ryan Lethlean	Melbourne Victory Youth	Brisbane Roar
11 January 2024	Taiga Harper	(Japan) Kashiwa Reysol	Western Sydney Wanderers
12 January 2024	Noah James	Newcastle Jets	(Australia) Sydney Olympic (loan)
12 January 2024	Keegan Jelacic	(Belgium) Gent	Brisbane Roar (loan)
12 January 2024	Oliver Bozanic	Perth Glory	Western Sydney Wanderers (end of loan)
16 January 2024	Bernardo Oliveira	Adelaide United	Macarthur FC
17 January 2024	Oliver Bozanic	Western Sydney Wanderers	Retired
18 January 2024	George Antonis	Western Sydney Wanderers	(Australia) Sydney Olympic
18 January 2024	Aydan Hammond	Central Coast Mariners Academy	Western Sydney Wanderers
19 January 2024	(Tunisia) Salim Khelifi	Perth Glory	Melbourne Victory (loan)
19 January 2024	(Republic of Ireland) Aaron McEneff	Perth Glory	(Republic of Ireland) Shamrock Rovers (loan)
21 January 2024	(Brazil) Ronald Barcellos	(Portugal) Portimonense	Central Coast Mariners (loan)
22 January 2024	Nathan Konstandopoulos	Melbourne Victory	(Australia) Heidelberg United
23 January 2024	Cameron Windust	Central Coast Mariners	Unattached
24 January 2024	(Morocco) Hamza Sakhi	Melbourne City	(France) Ajaccio
26 January 2024	(England) Ryan Edmondson	(England) Carlisle United	Central Coast Mariners
26 January 2024	Steven Hall	Adelaide United	(England) Brighton & Hove Albion
29 January 2024	Joshua Rawlins	(Netherlands) Jong Utrecht	Perth Glory (loan)
30 January 2024	(Costa Rica) Youstin Salas	(Costa Rica) Deportivo Saprissa	Wellington Phoenix (loan)
30 January 2024	Walter Scott	(Australia) Wollongong Wolves	Macarthur FC
30 January 2024	(New Zealand) Marco Rojas	Unattached	Brisbane Roar
30 January 2024	Aziz Behich	Melbourne City	(Saudi Arabia) Al Nassr (loan)
31 January 2024	Jimmy Jeggo	(Scotland) Hibernian	Melbourne City
31 January 2024	Alexandar Popovic	Adelaide United	(South Korea) Gwangju
31 January 2024	(Spain) Rai Marchán	Melbourne Victory	(Spain) Albacete Balompié
1 February 2024	Marco Tilio	(Scotland) Celtic	Melbourne City (loan)
1 February 2024	(Germany) Sonny Kittel	(Poland) Raków Częstochowa	Western Sydney Wanderers (loan)
2 February 2024	Joe Gauci	Adelaide United	(England) Aston Villa
2 February 2024	Stefan Mauk	Unattached	Adelaide United
5 February 2024	Luke Ivanovic	Perth Glory	(Finland) Lahti
6 February 2024	(New Zealand) Tommy Smith	(England) Milton Keynes Dons	Macarthur FC
6 February 2024	(Curaçao) Roly Bonevacia	(Kuwait) Al-Tadamon	Melbourne Victory
6 February 2024	Franco Lino	Melbourne Victory	(Norway) Viking
6 February 2024	James Bayliss	Central Coast Mariners	(Australia) Marconi Stallions
7 February 2024	Isaac Hovar	Macarthur FC	(Australia) Hills United
7 February 2024	Yaya Dukuly	(France) Reims	Adelaide United
8 February 2024	(Chile) Vicente Fernández	Unattached	Melbourne City
24 April 2024	Giuseppe Bovalina	Adelaide United	(Canada) Vancouver Whitecaps

Player was released to free agency before joining new club
McEneff was signed by Shamrock Rovers initially on loan with the deal to become permanent at the end of the 2024 season, with McEneff having signed a long-term contract
