= Adam Taggart =

Australian soccer player (born 1993)

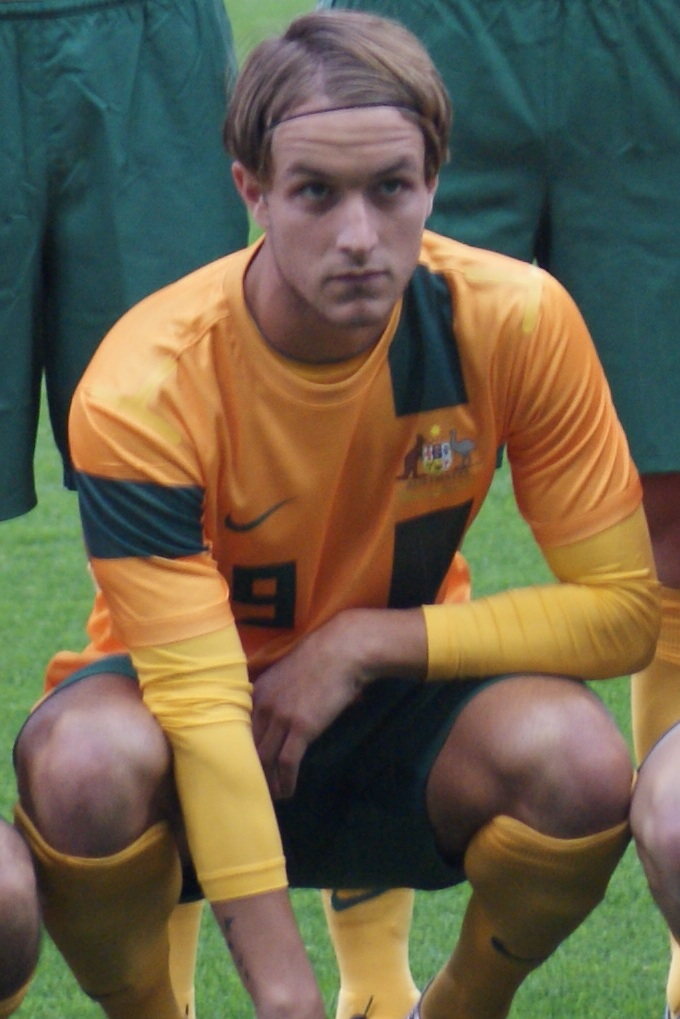
- Taggart with Australia U20 in 2013

Personal information
- Full name: Adam Jake Taggart
- Date of birth: 2 June 1993 (age 33)
- Place of birth: Perth, Western Australia, Australia
- Height: 1.83 m (6 ft 0 in)
- Position: Striker

Team information
- Current team: Hanoi FC
- Number: 26

Youth career
- –2007: ECU Joondalup
- 2007–2008: WA NTC
- 2008–2009: Perth Glory
- 2009–2010: AIS

Senior career*
Years	Team	Apps	(Gls)
2010–2012	Perth Glory	10	(1)
2012–2014	Newcastle Jets	44	(18)
2014–2016	Fulham	0	(0)
2015–2016	→ Dundee United (loan)	7	(0)
2016–2018	Perth Glory	38	(20)
2018–2019	Brisbane Roar	18	(11)
2019–2020	Suwon Samsung Bluewings	56	(29)
2020–2022	Cerezo Osaka	32	(6)
2022–2026	Perth Glory	85	(40)
2026–	Hanoi FC	2	(3)

International career^{‡}
2011–2013	Australia U20	14	(7)
2011–2014	Australia U23	13	(2)
2012–	Australia	21	(7)
- * Club domestic league appearances and goals as of 2 October 2026 ‡ National team caps and goals as of 20 March 2025

Adam Jake Taggart (/ˈtæɡərt/ TAG-ərt; born 2 June 1993) is an Australian professional soccer player who plays as a striker for V.League 1 club Hanoi FC, and the Australia national team.

Taggart has won two golden boot awards in his playing career which is the A-League Golden Boot award, scoring 16 goals in 25 appearances for Newcastle Jets during the 2013–14 A-League season and K League Golden Boot award, scoring 20 goals in 33 appearances for Suwon Samsung Bluewings during the 2019 K League 1 season.

== Club career ==
=== Perth Glory ===
Taggart made his senior debut in a 1–1 draw with Melbourne Heart in January 2011. He scored his first goal in a loss to Gold Coast United, 75 minutes into the game.

=== Newcastle Jets ===
On 2 March 2012, Taggart signed a two-year contract with A-League club Newcastle Jets. In November 2013, Taggart scored his first professional career hat-trick against Melbourne Heart with all three goals scored from outside the 18 yard box. Newcastle would go on and win the match 3–1. After a strong start to the season, Adam had a dry patch with a lack of goals around Christmas, before scoring a brace against the Wanderers to salvage a 2–2 draw. He became a focal point of the Newcastle Jets attack, heading the lineup alongside Emile Heskey, Joel Griffiths and Michael Bridges. In 2014, Taggart became the second Newcastle player to receive the golden boot of the A-League with 16 goals, after Joel Griffiths in 2008. He was also awarded the A-League Young Player of the Season Award at the same ceremony.

=== Fulham ===
On 24 June 2014, Fulham signed Taggart from Newcastle Jets for an undisclosed fee on a three-year contract but injury delayed his involvement with the first team by a number of months.

==== Loan to Dundee United ====
On 1 September 2015, Taggart signed for Scottish Premiership club Dundee United on a loan deal until January 2016.

=== Return to Perth Glory ===
On 26 January 2016, Taggart returned to Perth Glory again on a permanent deal. However, he was ineligible to play for Perth in the 2015–16 A-League under FIFA regulations preventing players from registering for more than two clubs in a single season. In the first game of the 2016–17 season, Taggart started in the number 11 role, scoring twice in the first half. After leading at half time 3–0, the Glory squandered the lead and the final result was a 3–3 draw.

=== Brisbane Roar ===
On 1 May 2018, Brisbane Roar announced the signing of Taggart as his contract at Perth Glory ended. He signed a contract with Brisbane contracting his services to them for the next two years. On 14 February 2019, Brisbane Roar announced Taggart had come to terms with an Asian club for his transfer.

=== Suwon Samsung Bluewings ===
On 18 February 2019, Taggart was sold to Korean giants, Suwon Samsung Bluewings for $150,000. Taggart made his debut on 1 March 2019 in a 2–1 defeat against Ulsan Hyundai where he came on as a substitute at half time scoring in the 63' minute. On 14 August 2019, he was named K League Player of the Month for July. Taggart was almost unplayable in July, scoring seven goals in just six league appearances to shoot to the top of the K-League scoring charts. On 17 August 2019, he scored his first K-League hat-trick against Gangwon FC. Taggart would finish the 2019 K-League 1 season as the league top goal scorer in his debut season and also winning the 2019 Korean FA Cup with the club.

On 26 August 2020, Taggart scored his second hat-trick for the club against FC Seoul in 3–1 win.

=== Cerezo Osaka ===
On 20 December 2020, Taggart was transferred to J1 League club Cerezo Osaka.

=== Third spell at Perth Glory ===
On 15 December 2022, Perth Glory announced that Taggart would be returning to the club on a three-and-a-half-year deal.

On 11 October 2023, Taggart was named as co-captain along with Mark Beevers ahead of the 2023–24 A-League season. His fine form throughout the season earned him a returned to the national team after a two years hiatus.

At the conclusion of the 2023–24 A-League season, Taggart became the first player in the A-League to win the golden boot whilst playing for a team who finished last.

On 22 March 2026, Taggart broke the club record for most goals in the A-League era, scoring his 60th goal for Perth in a 1–1 draw with Melbourne City.

=== Hanoi FC ===
On 31 August 2026, after terminating his contract with Perth Glory, Taggart moved to Vietnam, signing a one-year contract with V.League 1 side Hanoi FC.

== International career ==
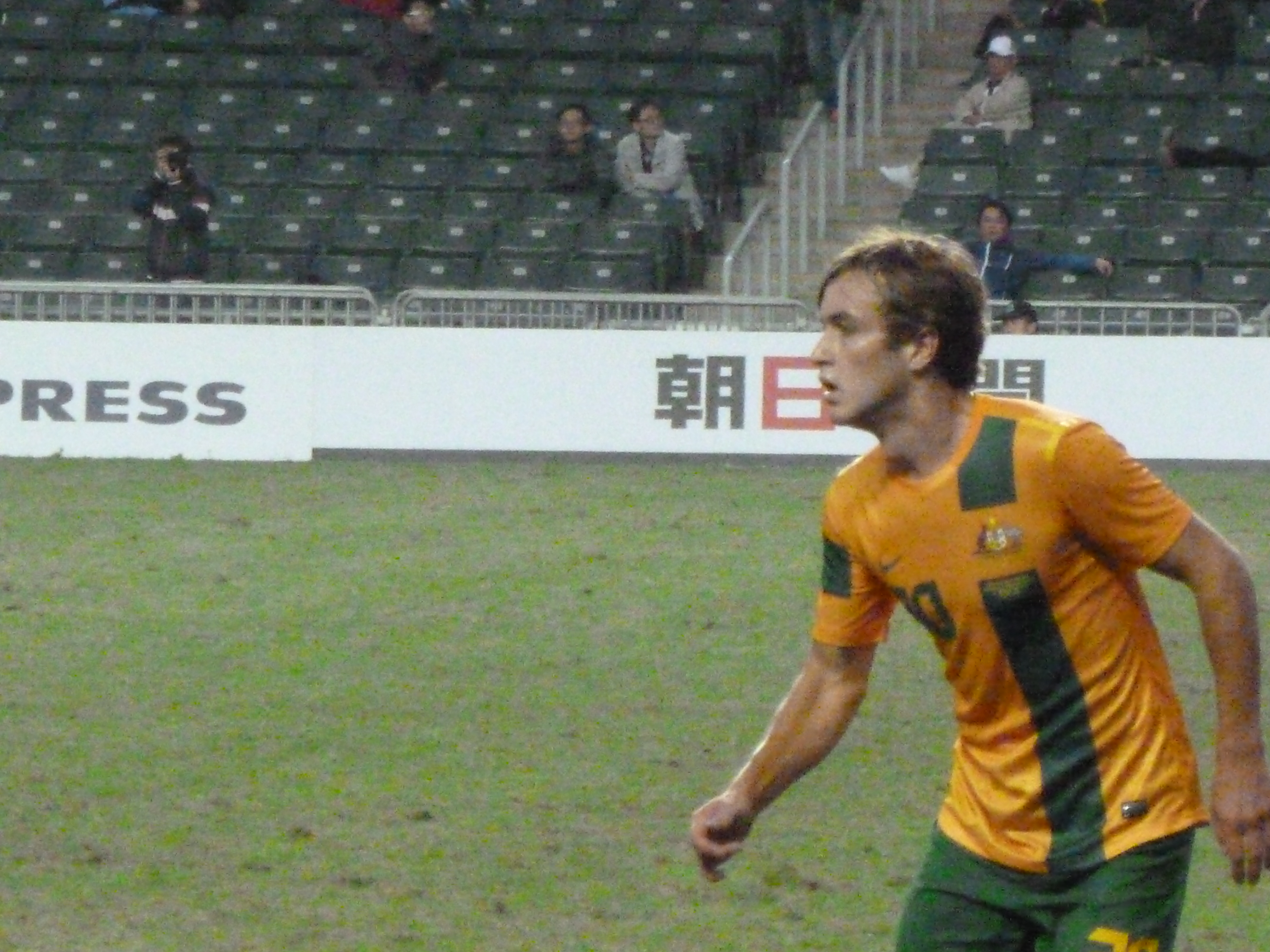
Taggart playing for Australia in 2013.

Taggart represented Australia at U-20 level at the 2012 AFC U-19 Championship in United Arab Emirates and at the 2013 FIFA U-20 World Cup in Turkey.

=== Senior ===
Taggart made his debut for Australia in late 2012, in the second preliminary round of the 2013 EAFF East Asian Cup against Hong Kong, coming off the bench in a narrow win. He scored his first two international goals days later in a win over Chinese Taipei.

In 2013, Taggart played in the 2013 EAFF East Asian Cup, scoring a goal in a loss to China.

Taggart was a part of the Socceroos squad for the 2014 FIFA World Cup, and played in matches against Netherlands and Spain.

In March 2024, Taggart returned to the national team after two years earning the called up with his form for Perth Glory scoring 15 goals in 19 appearances in the 2023–24 A-League season.

== Career statistics ==
=== Club ===
As of 17 May 2024

Appearances and goals by club, season and competition
Club	Season	League			National cup		League cup		Continental		Total	
Club	Season	Division	Apps	Goals	Apps	Goals	Apps	Goals	Apps	Goals	Apps	Goals
Perth Glory	2010–11	A-League	6	1	0	0	—		—		6	1
Perth Glory	2011–12	A-League	4	0	0	0	—		—		4	0
Perth Glory	Total		10	1	0	0	0	0	0	0	10	1
Newcastle Jets	2012–13	A-League	19	2	0	0	—		—		19	2
Newcastle Jets	2013–14	A-League	25	16	0	0	—		—		25	16
Newcastle Jets	Total		44	18	0	0	0	0	0	0	44	18
Fulham	2014–15	Championship	0	0	0	0	0	0	—		0	0
Fulham	2015–16	Championship	0	0	0	0	0	0	—		0	0
Fulham	Total		0	0	0	0	0	0	0	0	0	0
Dundee United (loan)	2015–16	Scottish Premiership	7	0	0	0	2	0	—		9	0
Perth Glory	2016–17	A-League	24	12	1	0	—		—		25	12
Perth Glory	2017–18	A-League	14	8	1	0	—		—		15	8
Perth Glory	Total		38	20	2	0	0	0	0	0	40	20
Brisbane Roar	2018–19	A-League	18	11	1	0	—		—		19	11
Suwon Samsung Bluewings	2019	K League 1	33	20	7	1	—		—		40	21
Suwon Samsung Bluewings	2020	K League 1	23	9	1	1	—		2	0	26	10
Suwon Samsung Bluewings	Total		56	29	8	2	0	0	2	0	66	31
Cerezo Osaka	2021	J1 League	12	1	3	1	0	0	4	1	19	3
Cerezo Osaka	2022	J1 League	20	5	2	1	3	1	—		23	7
Cerezo Osaka	Total		30	6	5	2	3	1	4	1	42	10
Perth Glory	2022–23	A-League	13	5	0	0	—		—		13	5
Perth Glory	2023–24	A-League	25	20	1	0	—		—		26	20
Perth Glory	Total		38	25	1	0	0	0	0	0	39	25
Career total			241	110	17	4	5	1	6	1	282	116

=== International ===
As of 11 June 2024

Appearances and goals by national team and year
National team	Year	Apps	Goals
Australia	2012	3	2
Australia	2013	1	1
Australia	2014	3	0
Australia	2019	4	3
Australia	2021	5	0
Australia	2022	1	0
Australia	2024	2	1
Total		19	7

Scores and results list Australia's goal tally first.

No.	Date	Venue	Opponent	Score	Result	Competition
1.	9 December 2012	Hong Kong Stadium, So Kon Po, Hong Kong	Chinese Taipei	3–0	8–0	2013 EAFF East Asian Cup qualification
2.	9 December 2012	Hong Kong Stadium, So Kon Po, Hong Kong	Chinese Taipei	4–0	8–0	2013 EAFF East Asian Cup qualification
3.	28 July 2013	Olympic Stadium, Songpa-gu, South Korea	China	2–4	3–4	2013 EAFF East Asian Cup
4.	15 October 2019	National Stadium, Kaohsiung, Taiwan	Chinese Taipei	1–0	7–1	2022 FIFA World Cup qualification
5.	15 October 2019	National Stadium, Kaohsiung, Taiwan	Chinese Taipei	2–0	7–1	2022 FIFA World Cup qualification
6.	14 November 2019	King Abdullah II Stadium, Amman, Jordan	Jordan	1–0	1–0	2022 FIFA World Cup qualification
7.	11 June 2024	Perth Rectangular Stadium, Perth, Australia	Palestine	2–0	5–0	2026 FIFA World Cup qualification

== Honours ==
Suwon Samsung Bluewings

- Korean FA Cup: 2019

Individual

- A-League Golden Boot: 2013–14, 2023–24
- A-League Young Player of the Year: 2013–14
- PFA A-League Team of the Season: 2013–14, 2023–24
- K League 1 Golden Boot: 2019
- K League 1 Best XI: 2019
- Perth Glory A-League Men's Most Glorious Player: 2023–24, 2024–25
- Perth Glory A-League Men's Players' Player of the Season: 2023–24
- Perth Glory A-League Men's Members' Player of the Season: 2023–24, 2024–25
- Perth Glory A-League Men's Goal of the Year: 2017–18, 2022–23
- A-Leagues All Star: 2024
