= Giordano Colli =

Australian soccer player (born 2000)

Personal information
- Full name: Giordano Colli
- Date of birth: 12 March 2000 (age 26)
- Place of birth: Perth, Western Australia, Australia
- Height: 1.82 m (6 ft 0 in)
- Position: Midfielder

Team information
- Current team: FC Tulsa
- Number: 20

Youth career
- Bayswater City

Senior career*
| Years | Team | Apps | (Gls) |
| 2017–2020 | Bayswater City | 34 | (4) |
| 2020–2023 | Perth Glory NPL | 41 | (10) |
| 2020–2024 | Perth Glory | 58 | (3) |
| 2025– | FC Tulsa | 50 | (2) |
- * Club domestic league appearances and goals as of 31 October 2026 ‡ National team caps and goals as of 19 November 2020

Giordano Colli (born 12 March 2000) is an Australian professional soccer player who plays as a midfielder for USL Championship club FC Tulsa. He previously played for National Premier Leagues Western Australia (NPL WA) clubs Bayswater City and Perth Glory NPL, and A-League Men club Perth Glory.

Giordano burst on to the scene after winning both the NPL Player of the Year and NPL Youth Player of the Year in his debut season for the Perth Glory NPL side. Giordano made his professional debut on 18 November 2020 against Shanghai Greenland Shenhua in the 2020 AFC Champions League.

== Club career ==
=== Perth Glory ===
Colli made his A-League debut for Perth Glory on 20 February 2022, coming off the bench against Brisbane Roar. On 3 April 2022, Colli scored his first professional goal with a free kick against Macarthur FC. On 23 October 2022, Colli scored his first A-League goal of the 2022/23 season against Central Coast Mariners. A week later on 30 October 2022, Colli scored a long-range effort against Adelaide United which was awarded the A-League Goal of the Week and eventually Goal of the Season. On 22 October 2023, Colli started in Perth Glory's opening fixture of the season, providing an assist for Stefan Colakovski.

=== FC Tulsa ===
On February 14 2025, FC Tulsa announced the signing of Colli, after several months without a club. On 9 March 2025, Colli made his debut for the club in a 1–0 win over Phoenix Rising. Colli registered his first assist for the club on 20 April 2025 in a 4–1 win over Las Vegas Lights FC
