= Luke Ivanovic =

Australian soccer player

Personal information
- Full name: Luke Ivanovic
- Date of birth: 6 June 2000 (age 26)
- Place of birth: Picton, Australia
- Height: 1.89 m (6 ft 2 in)
- Position: Forward

Team information
- Current team: Turun Palloseura
- Number: 9

Youth career
- Football NSW Institute
- 2014: APIA Leichhardt
- 2015–2018: Bonnyrigg White Eagles
- 2018–2021: Sydney FC

Senior career*
Years	Team	Apps	(Gls)
2017–2018	Bonnyrigg White Eagles	17	(2)
2018–2021	Sydney FC NPL	29	(3)
2018–2021	Sydney FC	36	(2)
2021–2022	Brisbane Roar	20	(4)
2022–2024	Perth Glory	24	(1)
2024	Lahti	24	(6)
2025	Monterey Bay	26	(4)
2026–	TPS	13	(1)
- * Club domestic league appearances and goals as of 13 November 2026 ‡ National team caps and goals as of 4 May 2018

Luke Ivanovic (born 6 June 2000) is an Australian professional soccer player who plays as a striker for Finnish club Turun Palloseura.

== Early years ==
Ivanovic started playing football with the Football NSW Institute and APIA Leichhardt.

== Club career ==
=== Bonnyrigg White Eagles ===
In March 2017, at the age of 16, Ivanovic made his senior debut for Bonnyrigg White Eagles in the opening game of the 2017 NPL NSW Men's 1 season against Sydney Olympic.

=== Sydney FC ===
Ivanovic joined A-League club Sydney FC in 2018. In January 2019, following a couple of senior appearances from the bench and based on his Y-League form, the club signed Ivanovic to a senior contract until the end of the 2018–19 A-League season. The following month he made his starting debut against Melbourne City, scoring his first goal for the club. At the end of the season he signed a one-year contract extension until the end of the 2019–20 A-League season. In December 2019, he signed a contract extension with the club, until the end of the 2021–22 A-League season. In July 2021, with one year left remaining on his contract, Sydney FC allowed Ivanovic to leave to allow him to receive more regular game time.

=== Brisbane Roar ===
A few weeks after leaving Sydney FC, Ivanovic signed with Brisbane Roar on a multi-year contract.

=== Perth Glory ===
Ivanovic signed for Perth Glory in September 2022.

In February 2024, it was confirmed that he would be leaving to join a club overseas.

=== Lahti ===
On 6 February 2024, Ivanovic moved to Finland and signed a one-year deal with FC Lahti in Veikkausliiga. He left the club after the relegation at the end of the season.

=== Monterey Bay ===
On 28 February 2025, he signed with Monterey Bay in USL Championship. Ivanovic departed Monterey Bay after his contract option was declined following the 2025 season.

=== Turun Palloseura ===
On 5 February, 2026, Ivanovic signed for top-flight Finnish club Turun Palloseura ahead of the 2026 Veikkausliiga season.

== Personal life ==
Ivanovic was born to two Serbian parents and grew up in Picton, south-west of Sydney.

== Career statistics ==
As of 27 April 2025

Club	Season	League			Cup		Other		Continental		Total	
Club	Season	Division	Apps	Goals	Apps	Goals	Apps	Goals	Apps	Goals	Apps	Goals
Sydney FC	2018–19	A-League	11	1	0	0	—		5 (Note: Appearances in AFC Champions League)	0	16	1
Sydney FC	2019–20	A-League	14	1	0	0	—		4	0	18	1
Sydney FC	2020–21	A-League	13	0	0	0	—		0	0	13	0
Sydney FC	Total		38	2	0	0	0	0	9	0	47	2
Brisbane Roar	2021–22	A-League Men	20	4	1	1	1	2	0	0	22	7
Brisbane Roar	2022–23	A-League Men	0	0	4	0	—		0	0	4	0
Brisbane Roar	Total		20	4	5	1	1	2	0	0	26	7
Perth Glory	2022–23	A-League Men	11	0	1	0	0	0	0	0	12	0
Perth Glory	2023–24	A-League Men	13	1	0	0	0	0	0	0	13	1
Perth Glory	Total		24	1	1	0	0	0	0	0	25	1
Lahti	2024	Veikkausliiga	26	6	3	3	4 (Note: Includes Finnish League Cup)	0	—		33	9
Monterey Bay	2025	USL Championship	5	1	2	0	–		–		7	1
Career total			113	14	11	4	5	2	9	0	138	20

== Honours ==
=== Club ===
Sydney FC

- A-League Championship: 2019–20
- A-League Premiership: 2019–20
