= Mark Beevers =

English footballer (born 1989)

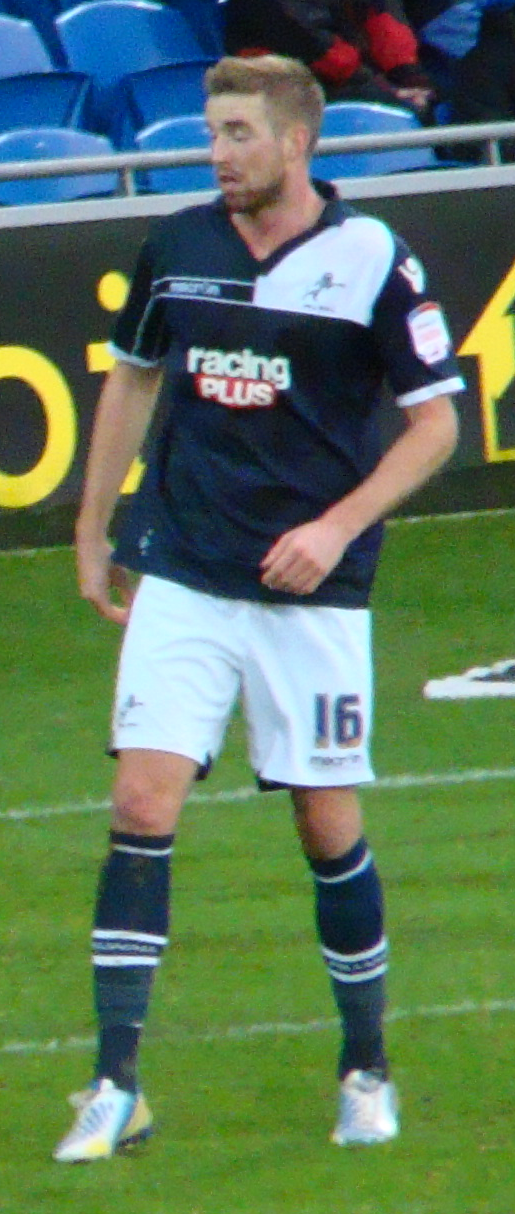
- Beevers playing for Millwall in 2012

Personal information
- Full name: Mark Geoffrey Beevers
- Date of birth: 21 November 1989 (age 36)
- Place of birth: Barnsley, England
- Height: 6 ft 4 in (1.93 m)
- Position: Defender

Team information
- Current team: Bradford (Park Avenue)

Youth career
- Sheffield Wednesday

Senior career*
| Years | Team | Apps | (Gls) |
| 2007–2013 | Sheffield Wednesday | 140 | (2) |
| 2011 | → Milton Keynes Dons (loan) | 14 | (1) |
| 2012–2013 | → Millwall (loan) | 16 | (1) |
| 2013–2016 | Millwall | 117 | (7) |
| 2016–2019 | Bolton Wanderers | 121 | (11) |
| 2019–2022 | Peterborough United | 91 | (0) |
| 2022–2024 | Perth Glory | 34 | (3) |
| 2024– | Bradford (Park Avenue) | 25 | (1) |

International career
| 2008 | England U19 | 1 | (0) |
- * Club domestic league appearances and goals as of 27 September 2024

Mark Geoffrey Beevers (born 21 November 1989) is an English professional footballer who plays as a defender for Northern Premier League Division One East club Bradford Park Avenue.

== Club career ==
=== Sheffield Wednesday ===
Beevers was born in Barnsley, South Yorkshire. He came through the youth system at South Yorkshire club Sheffield Wednesday and was called up to the senior squad for the FA Cup third round tie with Manchester City on 7 January 2007 after impressing for the reserve team, although he was never brought off the bench. He eventually made his senior debut against Southampton on 31 January 2007 when Wednesday lost 2–1.

Beevers made his first start of the 2007–08 season in a 2–0 defeat to Leicester City on 6 October 2007. Beevers replaced the injured Michael Johnson at half time, and his excellent performance earned him the man of the match award. Beevers gained another chance in the first team on 6 November 2007 in an away game at West Bromwich Albion, who were flying high in the league and the highest scorers in the league. Beevers lined up alongside Richard Hinds in an inexperienced centre back pairing, however Beevers played with the temperament and quality of a player far beyond his years and helped to earn the Owls a 1–1 draw.

Beevers scored his first senior goal on 6 January 2008 in an FA Cup 3rd round match against Premier League side Derby County which sparked more rumours he would be leaving for a bigger club. On 17 January 2008 he was placed on standby for England under-19s upcoming game against Croatia on 5 February 2008.

On 28 January 2008, Sheffield Wednesday announced that Beevers had signed an improved contract keeping him at the club until 2012. On 3 March 2008 Beevers was announced as the winner of the third annual Wickes Young Apprentice Trophy at the Football League Awards.

Beevers was voted as the club's Player of the Year at the end of the season by fans. On 31 August 2011, he was loaned to League One side Milton Keynes Dons. The loan ended on 31 December 2011.

=== Millwall ===
On 5 October 2012, he was loaned to Championship side Millwall and made his debut the day after against Bolton Wanderers in a 2–1 win. He scored a goal in Millwall's next game, a 2–2 draw with Crystal Palace on 6 October 2012, and on 6 December 2012 it was confirmed that Millwall would confirm the permanent signing of Mark Beevers on 1 January when the transfer window opens. Before the 2014–15 season it was announced that Millwall had rejected a £100,000 bid for Beevers from newly promoted Rotherham United

=== Bolton Wanderers ===
On 3 July 2016, he completed a move to Bolton Wanderers on a two-year contract after expressing a desire to leave Millwall and return to the North of England. Bolton finished the season in second place, which was enough to secure an immediate return to the Championship. Beevers, alongside his defensive partner David Wheater, was included in the League One team of the Season. His contract was extended by Bolton at the end of the 2017–18 season after the club exercised a contractual option.

=== Peterborough United ===
On 24 May 2019, he completed a move to Peterborough United on a three-year contract after his Bolton contract expired. On 29 April 2021, following an impressive 2020–21 season, Beevers was named in the 2020–21 EFL League One Team of the Season at the league's annual awards ceremony.

On 20 June 2022, Beevers had his contract terminated by mutual consent.

=== Perth Glory ===
On 22 June 2022, it was confirmed that Beevers had signed for A-League club Perth Glory on a two-year deal.

On 11 October 2023, Beevers was named as co-captain along with Adam Taggart ahead of the 2023–24 A-League Men season.

=== Bradford (Park Avenue) ===
In September 2024, having relocated back to England, Beevers joined Northern Premier League Division One East club Bradford (Park Avenue) on a one-year deal.

== International career ==
On 23 March 2008, Beevers was called up to the England U19 squad replacing Chelsea's Sam Hutchinson. He went on to make his debut as a second-half substitute in the 3–1 win against Russia on 25 March 2008.

== Career statistics ==
As of 7 May 2023

Appearances and goals by club, season and competition
| Club | Season | League | | | National cup | | League Cup | | Other | | Total | |
| Club | Season | Division | Apps | Goals | Apps | Goals | Apps | Goals | Apps | Goals | Apps | Goals |
|---|---|---|---|---|---|---|---|---|---|---|---|---|
| Sheffield Wednesday | 2006–07 | Championship | 2 | 0 | 0 | 0 | 0 | 0 | — | | 2 | 0 |
| Sheffield Wednesday | 2007–08 | Championship | 28 | 0 | 2 | 1 | 0 | 0 | — | | 30 | 1 |
| Sheffield Wednesday | 2008–09 | Championship | 34 | 0 | 1 | 0 | 1 | 0 | — | | 36 | 0 |
| Sheffield Wednesday | 2009–10 | Championship | 35 | 0 | 1 | 0 | 2 | 0 | — | | 38 | 0 |
| Sheffield Wednesday | 2010–11 | League One | 28 | 2 | 3 | 1 | 2 | 0 | 4 | 0 | 37 | 3 |
| Sheffield Wednesday | 2011–12 | League One | 7 | 0 | 1 | 0 | 1 | 0 | 1 | 0 | 10 | 0 |
| Sheffield Wednesday | 2012–13 | Championship | 6 | 0 | 0 | 0 | 2 | 0 | — | | 8 | 0 |
| Sheffield Wednesday | Total | | 140 | 2 | 8 | 2 | 8 | 0 | 5 | 0 | 161 | 4 |
| Milton Keynes Dons (loan) | 2011–12 | League One | 14 | 1 | 0 | 0 | 0 | 0 | 0 | 0 | 14 | 1 |
| Millwall (loan) | 2012–13 | Championship | 16 | 1 | 0 | 0 | 0 | 0 | — | | 16 | 1 |
| Millwall | 2012–13 | Championship | 19 | 0 | 6 | 0 | 0 | 0 | — | | 25 | 0 |
| Millwall | 2013–14 | Championship | 28 | 0 | 0 | 0 | 2 | 0 | — | | 30 | 0 |
| Millwall | 2014–15 | Championship | 25 | 2 | 1 | 0 | 0 | 0 | — | | 26 | 2 |
| Millwall | 2015–16 | League One | 45 | 5 | 1 | 0 | 1 | 0 | 6 | 0 | 53 | 5 |
| Millwall | Total | | 133 | 8 | 8 | 0 | 3 | 0 | 6 | 0 | 150 | 8 |
| Bolton Wanderers | 2016–17 | League One | 45 | 7 | 4 | 0 | 1 | 0 | 1 | 0 | 51 | 7 |
| Bolton Wanderers | 2017–18 | Championship | 44 | 1 | 1 | 0 | 2 | 0 | — | | 47 | 1 |
| Bolton Wanderers | 2018–19 | Championship | 32 | 3 | 2 | 1 | 0 | 0 | — | | 34 | 4 |
| Bolton Wanderers | Total | | 121 | 11 | 7 | 1 | 3 | 0 | 1 | 0 | 132 | 12 |
| Peterborough United | 2019–20 | League One | 32 | 0 | 4 | 0 | 1 | 0 | 0 | 0 | 37 | 0 |
| Peterborough United | 2020–21 | League One | 45 | 0 | 1 | 0 | 1 | 0 | 2 | 0 | 49 | 0 |
| Peterborough United | 2021–22 | Championship | 14 | 0 | 1 | 0 | 0 | 0 | 0 | 0 | 15 | 0 |
| Peterborough United | Total | | 91 | 0 | 6 | 0 | 2 | 0 | 2 | 0 | 101 | 0 |
| Perth Glory | 2022–23 | A-League Men | 24 | 2 | 0 | 0 | — | | — | | 24 | 2 |
| Career total | | | 524 | 24 | 29 | 3 | 16 | 0 | 14 | 0 | 582 | 27 |

== Honours ==
Sheffield Wednesday

- Football League One runner-up: 2011–12

Bolton Wanderers

- EFL League One runner-up: 2016–17

Peterborough United

- EFL League One runner-up: 2020–21

Individual

- Football League Championship Apprentice Award: 2008
- Sheffield Wednesday Player of the Year: 2007–08
- PFA Team of the Year: 2016–17 League One
- EFL League One Team of the Season: 2020–21
- Perth Glory Player of the Season: 2023
