= Stefan Colakovski =

Macedonian professional footballer

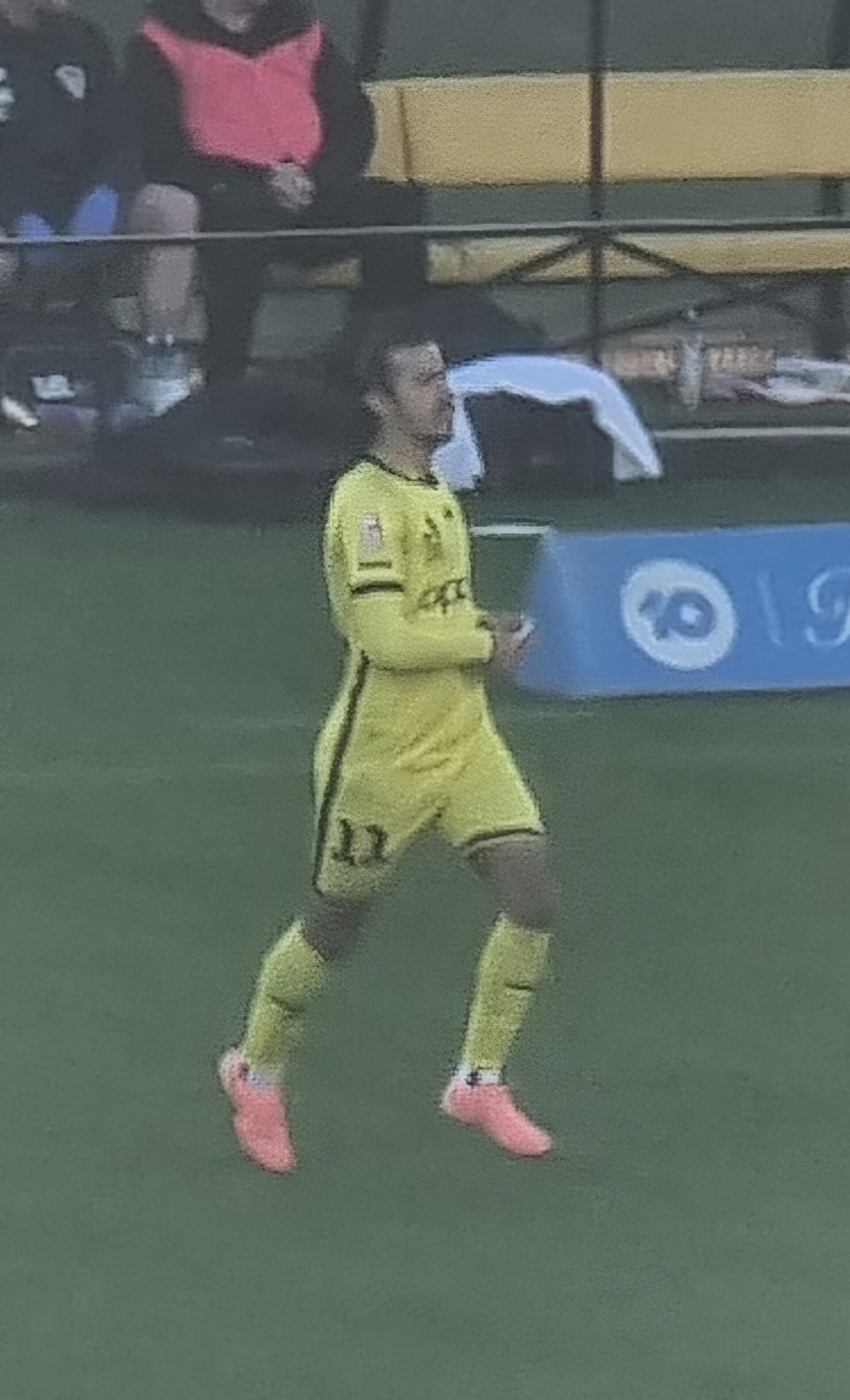
- Colakovski playing for the Wellington Phoenix in 2024.

Personal information
- Full name: Stefan Colakovski
- Date of birth: 20 April 2000 (age 26)
- Place of birth: Melbourne, Victoria, Australia
- Height: 1.77 m (5 ft 10 in)
- Position: Forward

Team information
- Current team: Perth Glory
- Number: 7

Youth career
- Pascoe Vale
- 2015–2017: Melbourne City

Senior career*
Years	Team	Apps	(Gls)
2017–2020	Melbourne City NPL	41	(14)
2019–2022	Melbourne City	46	(3)
2022–2024	Perth Glory	24	(6)
2023	Perth Glory NPL	1	(0)
2024–2025	Wellington Phoenix	6	(0)
2026–	Perth Glory	13	(3)

International career^{‡}
2021–2022	Macedonia U21	2	(0)
- * Club domestic league appearances and goals as of 29 April 2026 ‡ National team caps and goals as of 7 September 2021

Stefan Colakovski (Macedonian: Стефан Чолаковски, romanized: Stefan Cholakovski; born 20 April 2000) is a professional soccer player who plays as a forward for A-League club Perth Glory. Born in Australia, he has represented Macedonia at youth level.

Colakovski also has a 'C' Diploma in coaching, and since April 2025 has run his own football clinic in Melbourne.

== Early life ==
Colakovski is a Macedonian-Australian, being of Aromanian heritage. As a child he supported Melbourne Heart (now known as Melbourne City).

== Club career ==
=== Melbourne City ===
After playing in Melbourne City's youth setup for three years, on 4 November 2019, Colakovski made his senior professional debut against Wellington Phoenix in the A-League. On 1 February 2020, Colakovski was offered a full senior deal contract for Melbourne City.

Colakovski scored his first A-League goal in a Melbourne Derby match in the 2020–21 season by scoring the sixth and final goal in a 6–0 win against Melbourne Victory. Colakovski scored his second A-League goal for Melbourne City against Macarthur FC in the 2021 A-League Finals Series. He assisted Marco Tilio for his second goal in the A-League to put Melbourne City through to the Grand Finals.

=== Perth Glory ===
In June 2022, it was announced that Colakovski signed with Perth Glory on a two-year deal. In May 2024, at the conclusion of his contract, he announced he's departing Perth Glory to take up an opportunity overseas.

=== Wellington Phoenix ===
After Colakovski's move to Europe didn't come into fruition, he returned to the A-League Men and signed a one-year deal with Wellington Phoenix. Suffering knee injuries throughout the season, Colakovski made only six appearances for the club, before being released at the end of the season.

=== Return to Perth Glory ===
Following the release from his contract from Wellington Phoenix, Colakovski returned to Perth to continue his rehab. Good performances in training earned him a move back to Perth in January 2026. Colakovski made 13 appearances, scoring three goals and picking up two assists during the second half of the 2025–26 season, with his performances earning him a one-year contract extension, keeping him at the club for the 2026–27 season.

== Career statistics ==
=== Club ===
As of match played 28 May 2024

Appearances and goals by club, season and competition
Club	Season	League			National Cup		Asia		Other		Total	
Club	Season	Division	Apps	Goals	Apps	Goals	Apps	Goals	Apps	Goals	Apps	Goals
Melbourne City NPL	2017	NPL Victoria 2	26	5	—		—		—		26	5
Melbourne City NPL	2019	NPL Victoria 2	26	9	—		—		—		26	9
Melbourne City NPL	2021	NPL Victoria 3	2	2	—		—		—		2	2
Melbourne City NPL	Total		54	16	—		—		—		54	16
Melbourne City	2019–20	A-League	7	0	0	0	—		—		7	0
Melbourne City	2020–21	A-League	21	3	—		—		—		21	3
Melbourne City	2021–22	A-League	18	0	2	0	6	1	—		26	1
Melbourne City	Total		46	3	2	0	6	1	0	0	54	4
Perth Glory	2022–23	A-League Men	2	0	—		—		—		2	0
Perth Glory	2023–24	A-League Men	22	6	1	0	—		—		23	6
Perth Glory	Total		24	6	1	0	0	0	0	0	25	6
Career total			124	25	3	0	6	1	0	0	131	26

== Honours ==
=== Club ===
==== Melbourne City ====
- A-League Premiership: 2020–21 2021-22
- A-League Championship: 2021

=== Individual ===
- Perth Glory A-League Men's Goal of the Season: 2023-24
