= Chris Donnell =

Australian soccer player

- Donnell playing for Central Coast Mariners in 2026

Personal information
- Full name: Chris Robert Donnell
- Date of birth: 24 January 2004 (age 22)
- Place of birth: Glasgow, Scotland
- Position: Defensive midfielder

Team information
- Current team: Central Coast Mariners
- Number: 8

Youth career
- 2019–2022: Perth Glory
- 2023–: Fulham

Senior career*
Years	Team	Apps	(Gls)
2020–2023	Perth Glory NPL	32	(2)
2021–2023	Perth Glory	4	(0)
2023–2025	Fulham	0	(0)
2024	→ Airdrieonians (loan)	12	(0)
2025–2026	Sydney Olympic	0	(0)
2026–	Central Coast Mariners	19	(0)

International career^{‡}
2022–2023	Australia U20	8	(1)
- * Club domestic league appearances and goals as of 22 November 2026 ‡ National team caps and goals as of 14:24, 7 July 2023 (UTC)

Chris Robert Donnell (born 24 January 2004) is a professional soccer player who plays as a defensive midfielder for Central Coast Mariners in the A-League Men. Born in Scotland, Donnell represents the Australian national team at youth level.

== Club career ==
=== Perth Glory ===
Born in Glasgow, Scotland, and a youth product of Perth Glory Academy, Donnell made his first-team debut against Melbourne Victory in a FFA Cup playoff match on 24 November 2021. He made a further three senior appearances for Perth Glory, including his A-League Men debut against Wellington Phoenix on 13 April 2022. He extended on a two-year contract in February 2023, amassing only one appearance during the 2022–23 season.

=== Fulham ===
In July 2023, Donnell was announced to have signed for English Premier League club Fulham for an undisclosed fee, after a successful trial with the London side. Amidst good form with the under-21 squad, Donnell joined Scottish Championship club Airdrieonians on 1 February 2024, on loan until the end of the season. Donnell came on as a second-half substitute for Airdrieonians in the side's win in the 2024 Scottish Challenge Cup final.

In May 2025, he announced that he will be leaving the club

=== Sydney Olympic ===
In October 2025, Donnell joined NPL NSW club Sydney Olympic.

=== Central Coast Mariners ===
In January 2026, Donnell returned to the top tier, signing with A-League Men club Central Coast Mariners until the end of the season. Donnell was a regular in the team for the remainder of the season, and continued with the club for the 2026-27 season. To start the new season, Donnell captained the team in their Australia Cup Round of 32 fixture against Sydney United, however the team were knocked out of the tournament on penalties.

== Honours ==
Airdrieonians

- Scottish Challenge Cup: 2023–24
