= Adam Zimarino =

Australian soccer player

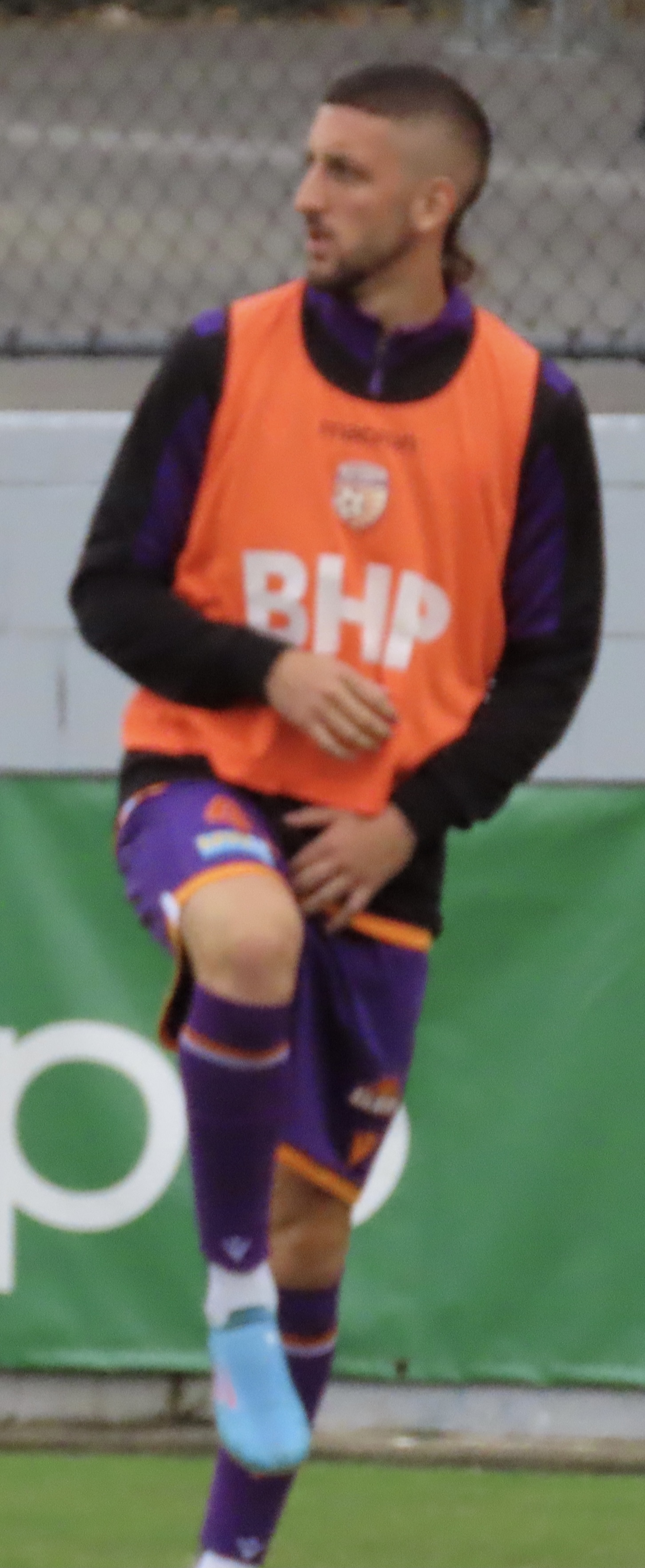
- Zimarino warming up for Perth Glory in March 2022

Personal information
- Full name: Adam Zimarino
- Date of birth: 15 March 2001 (age 25)
- Place of birth: Perth, Australia
- Height: 1.82 m (6 ft 0 in)
- Position: Striker

Team information
- Current team: Avondale FC
- Number: 7

Youth career
- Perth SC
- Perth Glory

Senior career*
| Years | Team | Apps | (Gls) |
| 2020 | Perth SC | 16 | (8) |
| 2021–2022 | Perth Glory NPL | 27 | (13) |
| 2021–2024 | Perth Glory | 25 | (2) |
| 2024–2025 | Brisbane Roar | 18 | (1) |
| 2026– | Avondale FC | 13 | (2) |
- * Club domestic league appearances and goals as of 1 September 2026

Adam Zimarino (born 15 March 2001) is an Australian professional soccer player who plays as a striker for Avondale FC. He made his professional debut in a FFA Cup playoff match for Perth Glory against Melbourne Victory on 24 November 2021.
