= Luke Bodnar =

Australian soccer player

Personal information
- Full name: Luke Joshua Bodnar
- Date of birth: 19 May 2000 (age 26)
- Place of birth: Perth, Australia
- Height: 1.82 m (5 ft 11 1/2 in)
- Positions: Defender; midfielder

Youth career
- Perth Glory

Senior career*
Years	Team	Apps	(Gls)
2018–2029	Perth Glory NPL	33	(1)
2020	ECU Joondalup	13	(1)
2020–2025	Perth Glory	45	(1)
2021–2023	Perth Glory NPL	2	(0)
2025	Al-Ittifaq	0	(0)
2025–	Perth RedStar	0	(0)
Medal record
Men's football
Representing Australia
AFF U-16 Youth Championship
Third place	2015 Cambodia	U-17 Team
- * Club domestic league appearances and goals as of 2 January 2025 ‡ National team caps and goals as of 18 November 2020

Luke Joshua Bodnar (born 19 May 2000) is an Australian professional soccer player who plays as a defender or midfielder for NPL WA club Perth RedStar.

He made his professional debut on 18 November 2020 against Shanghai Greenland Shenhua in the 2020 AFC Champions League.

== Club career ==
=== Perth Glory ===
In January 2025, Bodnar had his contract mutually terminated to allow him to take up an opportunity overseas.

He signed for UAE Second Division League (national third-tier) club Al-Ittifaq in February 2025.

Less than two months after moving to Al-Ittifaq, Bodnar returned to Australia to sign with NPL WA club Perth RedStar in April 2025.

== Personal life ==
Born in Australia, Bodnar is of Romanian descent.
