= Jacob Muir =

Australian professional soccer

Personal information
- Full name: Jacob Muir
- Date of birth: 3 May 2002 (age 24)
- Place of birth: Perth, Australia
- Height: 1.83 m (6 ft 0 in)
- Position: Central defender

Team information
- Current team: Avondale FC

Youth career
- 2015–2017: Sorrento FC
- 2018–2024: Perth Glory

Senior career*
Years	Team	Apps	(Gls)
2019–2022	Perth Glory NPL	44	(0)
2021–2024	Perth Glory	33	(0)
2025	Monterey Bay	10	(0)
2026–	Avondale FC	18	(1)
- * Club domestic league appearances and goals as of 26 June 2026

Jacob Muir (born 3 May 2002) is an Australian professional soccer player who plays as a central defender for Avondale FC in NPL Victoria.

== Early life ==
Muir was born in Perth in 2002 and attended Carmel School.

== Club career ==
Muir played youth soccer for Sorrento FC and Perth Glory.

Muir made his debut for Perth Glory in a FFA Cup match in Adelaide vs. Melbourne Victory on 24 November 2021. In November 2024, he left the club, terminating his contract by mutual consent.

In December 2024, Muir agreed to join USL Championship side Monterey Bay on a one-year deal with an option for an additional year. His contract option was declined following the end of the 2025 season.

After departing Monterey Bay, Muir returned to Australia and joined Avondale FC in NPL Victoria. He made a substitute appearance in the 2026 NPL Victoria Grand Final, which Avondale won on penalties against Oakleigh Cannons.
