= Cameron Cook =

Australian soccer player (born 2001)

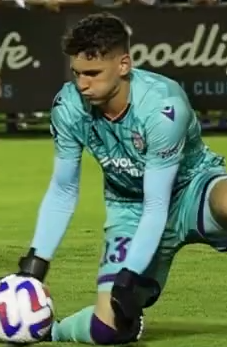
- Cook playing for Perth Glory in 2023

Personal information
- Full name: Cameron Cook
- Date of birth: 16 August 2001 (age 25)
- Place of birth: Alice Springs, Australia
- Height: 1.88 m (6 ft 2 in)
- Position: Goalkeeper

Youth career
- Vikings FC
- Adelaide United
- 2020–: Perth Glory

Senior career*
Years	Team	Apps	(Gls)
2017–2020	Adelaide United NPL	6	(0)
2020–2026	Perth Glory NPL	25	(0)
2021–2026	Perth Glory	40	(0)

International career^{‡}
2023	Australia U23	2	(0)
Medal record
Men's football
Representing Australia
WAFF U-23 Championship
Runner-up	2024 Saudi Arabia
- * Club domestic league appearances and goals as of 4 May 2025 ‡ National team caps and goals as of 1 May 2023

Cameron Cook (born 16 August 2001) is an Australian professional soccer player who last played as a goalkeeper for Perth Glory. He made his professional debut in a FFA Cup playoff match against Melbourne Victory on 24 November 2021.

== Perth Glory ==
On 7 December 2021, Cook made his A-league debut in a 3-0 win against Melbourne Victory and became the first player born in Alice Springs to play in the A-league.

== International career ==
In June 2023, he took part in the Maurice Revello Tournament in France with Australia.

== Honours ==
Australia U-23

- WAFF U-23 Championship: runner-up 2024
