= Matt Hatch =

Australian soccer player

- Hatch playing for Central Coast Mariners in 2020

Personal information
- Full name: Matthew Hatch
- Date of birth: 24 September 2000 (age 26)
- Place of birth: Gosford, Australia
- Positions: Full-back; winger

Team information
- Current team: Central Coast United
- Number: 19

Youth career
- Woy Woy Roosters
- Kincumber
- Central Coast FC
- Central Coast Mariners

Senior career*
Years	Team	Apps	(Gls)
2018–2022	CCM Academy	52	(7)
2020–2022	Central Coast Mariners	20	(5)
2022–2023	Perth Glory	3	(0)
2023	Marconi Stallions	9	(0)
2024–2025	Sydney United 58	47	(4)
2026–	Central Coast United	20	(5)
- * Club domestic league appearances and goals as of 29 June 2026

Matthew Hatch (born 24 September 2000) is an Australian footballer who plays as a midfielder for Central Coast United in the NSW League Two competition.

== Career ==
=== Central Coast Mariners ===
Having grown up on the Central Coast of NSW, Hatch got his professional breakthrough with local club Central Coast Mariners. On 10 March 2021, Hatch broke the record for fastest ever debut goal in Australian professional history, scoring a goal with his first touch 25 seconds after being substituted onto the pitch for his debut.

Hatch made 20 appearances for the Mariners, scoring 5 goals, before departing the club at the end of the 2021-22 season.

=== Perth Glory ===
Hatch joined Perth Glory for the 2022-23 A-League season.

Hatch made 3 appearances for Perth, before being released at the end of his first season.

=== Marconi Stallions ===
Following his departure from Perth Glory, Hatch returned to his home state to play for Marconi Stallions, for the second half of the 2023 NPL NSW season.

=== Sydney United 58 ===
Having spent half a season back in the NPL with Marconi, Hatch joined Sydney United 58 for the 2024 season.

Hatch made 47 league appearances for Sydney United over 2 seasons, scoring 4 goals.

=== Central Coast United ===
For the 2026 NSW League Two season, Hatch signed for Central Coast United in the third tier of Football NSW competitions, returning to represent a club from his home region of the Central Coast.

== Honours ==
Central Coast Mariners Academy

- National Premier Leagues NSW 2 Premiership: 2020
- National Premier Leagues NSW 2 Championship: 2020

Sydney United

- Waratah Cup: 2025

Records

- Fastest debut goal in the A-League: 25 seconds

== See also ==
- List of Central Coast Mariners FC players
