= Jacob Young (soccer) =

Australian soccer player (born 2000)

Personal information
- Full name: Jacob Young
- Date of birth: 6 March 2000 (age 26)
- Place of birth: Wollongong, Australia
- Position: Defender

Youth career
- Cockburn City
- Perth Glory
- Sunderland
- 2019–2021: Hoffenheim

Senior career*
| Years | Team | Apps | (Gls) |
| 2018 | Sunderland | 0 | (0) |
| 2019 | Hoffenheim II | 2 | (0) |
| 2022–2023 | Perth Glory NPL | | |
| 2022–2023 | Perth Glory | 2 | (0) |
- * Club domestic league appearances and goals as of 15 September 2022 ‡ National team caps and goals as of 2 February 2022

Jacob Young (born 6 March 2000), is an Australian professional footballer who plays as a defender for Perth Glory.

== Club career ==
=== Perth Glory ===
On 2 February 2022, following a shortage of players due to COVID-19, Young was signed by Perth Glory on a short-term contract until the end of the 2021–22 A-League Men season and made his debut on the same day in a 1–0 loss to Western Sydney Wanderers. After making two A-League Men appearances and impressing in 11 appearances for the academy side in the NPL WA, Young signed a one year scholarship with the club for the 2022–23 A-League Men season.

== Personal life ==
Jacob is the son of former professional footballer Stuart Young.
