= Antonee Burke-Gilroy =

English footballer (b.1997)

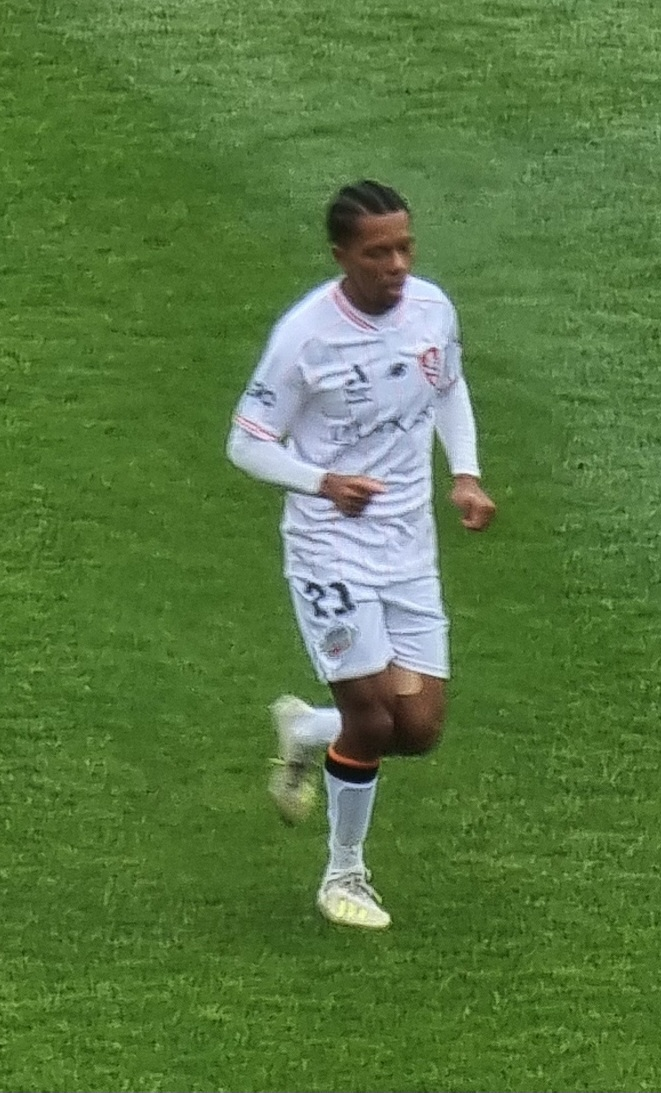
- Burke-Gilroy playing for Brisbane Roar in 2024.

Personal information
- Full name: Antonee Alan Burke-Gilroy
- Date of birth: 3 October 1997 (age 29)
- Place of birth: Denmark Hill, London, England
- Height: 1.78 m (5 ft 10 in)
- Position: Winger

Team information
- Current team: Preston Lions
- Number: 23

Youth career
- 2014–2017: Newcastle Jets

Senior career*
Years	Team	Apps	(Gls)
2015–2017	Newcastle Jets NPL	20	(2)
2017–2018	Newcastle Jets	0	(0)
2017	→ Académica B (loan)	7	(0)
2018–2020	Tacoma Defiance	55	(3)
2021	Altona Magic	6	(1)
2021	Brisbane Roar	2	(0)
2021	Brisbane Roar NPL	3	(0)
2021–2023	Perth Glory	34	(1)
2023–2026	Brisbane Roar	45	(0)
2026–	Preston Lions	1	(0)
- * Club domestic league appearances and goals as of 16 August 2026 ‡ National team caps and goals as of 10 May 2022

Antonee Burke-Gilroy (born 3 October 1997) is an English-born Australian soccer player who currently plays for National Premier Leagues Victoria club Preston Lions.

== Career ==
Burke-Gilroy played with Newcastle Jets as well as spending six months on loan with Portuguese side Académica.

Burke-Gilroy signed with United Soccer League side Seattle Sounders FC 2 on 1 May 2018.

Burke-Gilroy played for Tacoma Defiance in the USL Championship.

Burke-Gilroy joined Brisbane Roar as an injury replacement player at the backend of the 2020-21 A-League season, appearing twice for the club.

In 2021, Burke-Gilroy joined Perth Glory. Burke-Gilroy made 34 league appearances for Perth over two seasons before being released at the end of the 2022–23 season.

On 9 November 2023, Burke-Gilroy returned to Brisbane Roar between rounds 3 and 4 of the 2023–24 A-League, following a brief period as a free agent after his departure from Perth Glory.

At the end of the 2025–26 A-League Men season, Burke-Gilroy left Brisbane Roar.
