= Joseph Forde =

Australian soccer player (born 2003)

Personal information
- Full name: Joseph Aidan Forde
- Date of birth: 28 December 2003 (age 22)
- Place of birth: Perth, Australia
- Height: 1.81 m (5 ft 11 in)
- Position: Defender

Team information
- Current team: Hume City

Youth career
- Forrestfield United
- Perth Glory

Senior career*
Years	Team	Apps	(Gls)
2020–2024	Perth Glory NPL	40	(0)
2021–2024	Perth Glory	17	(0)
2024	Waterford	4	(0)
2025–	Hume City	2	(0)

International career^{‡}
2022–	Australia U-20	1	(0)
- * Club domestic league appearances and goals as of 19 February 2025 ‡ National team caps and goals as of 28 September 2022

Joseph Aidan Forde (born 28 December 2003) is an Australian professional soccer player who plays as a defender for Hume City in the Victorian Premier League. He began his career with his hometown club Perth Glory, before playing for League of Ireland Premier Division club Waterford for a season.

== Club career ==
As a junior, Forde played for Forrestfield United, before moving to Perth Glory. He made his professional debut in a FFA Cup playoff match against Melbourne Victory on 24 November 2021.

On 8 January 2024, Forde was granted a mutual termination of his contract by Perth Glory to allow him to take up an opportunity in Europe and he signed for League of Ireland Premier Division club Waterford. On 12 November 2024, it was announced that Forde had been released at the end of the season, after making 4 league appearances during his time with the club.

== Personal life ==
Forde is the grandson of Irish Olympic footballer Hugh Forde and great-nephew of Irish professional footballer Tommy Forde.
