= Jacob Dowse =

Australian soccer player

Personal information
- Full name: Jacob Dowse
- Date of birth: 13 June 2000 (age 26)
- Height: 1.84 m (6 ft 0 in)
- Position: Midfielder

Youth career
- 2015–2016: Emerging Jets
- 2017–2021: Broadmeadow Magic

Senior career*
Years	Team	Apps	(Gls)
2017–2022	Broadmeadow Magic	55	(15)
2022–2023	Perth Glory	17	(0)
2023–2025	Newcastle Jets	0	(0)
- * Club domestic league appearances and goals as of 1 May 2023

Jacob Dowse is an Australian retired professional footballer who last played as a midfielder for Newcastle Jets.

== Youth career ==
Jacob played for the Newcastle Jets FC Youth in the National Premier Leagues Northern NSW, before he was eventually released due to numerous knee injuries.

== Broadmeadow Magic ==
Following his release from the Newcastle Jets, he was contacted by close friend Jeremy Wilson to play for Broadmeadow Magic FC. He impressed enough in the youth ranks to earn his first team debut at the age of 16. Dowse

== Perth Glory ==
Dowse was offered a trial at Perth by his former coach at Broadmeadow Magic, Ruben Zadkovich who was then head coach of Perth Glory. The trial was successful and he signed a scholarship contract with the club.

In September 2022, Dowse signed a scholarship deal with Perth Glory. He made his A-League Men debut against Central Coast Mariners on 23 October 2022 coming off the bench in a 2–1 win. Dowse made his first and only start for Perth on 6 January 2023 against the Western Sydney Wanderers, playing 57 minutes as a striker before being substituted. Dowse left Perth Glory at the conclusion of the 2022–23 A-League season, having contributed 5 assists across his 17 appearances.

== Newcastle Jets ==
In May 2023, Dowse returned to his youth club Newcastle Jets, signing a two-year contract. Dowse made his Jets debut on 14 August 2023 in the First Round of the Australia Cup against Melbourne Victory FC, being substituted in at the start of extra time as the Jets were knocked out 3-2 after extra time. In May 2025, He left the club at the conclusion of his contract.

== Career statistics ==
As of Matches Played 21st July 2024

Appearances and goals by club, season and competition
Club	Season	League			National Cup		Continental		Total	
Club	Season	Division	Apps	Goals	Apps	Goals	Apps	Goals	Apps	Goals
Broadmeadow Magic FC	2017	National Premier Leagues Northern NSW	10	0			N/A			
Broadmeadow Magic FC	2018	National Premier Leagues Northern NSW	1	0			N/A			
Broadmeadow Magic FC	2019	National Premier Leagues Northern NSW	4	0			N/A			
Broadmeadow Magic FC	2020	National Premier Leagues Northern NSW	16	1			N/A			
Broadmeadow Magic FC	2021	National Premier Leagues Northern NSW	9	2			N/A			
Broadmeadow Magic FC	2022	National Premier Leagues Northern NSW	15	12			N/A			
Broadmeadow Magic FC	Broadmeadow Magic Total		55	15			N/A		55	15
Perth Glory FC	2022-23	A-League Men	17	0	0	0	0	0	17	0
Newcastle Jets FC	2023-24	A-League Men	0	0	1	0	0	0	1	0
Newcastle Jets FC	2024-25	A-League Men					0	0		
Career total			72	15			0	0		
