= Zach Duncan =

Australian soccer player (born 2000)

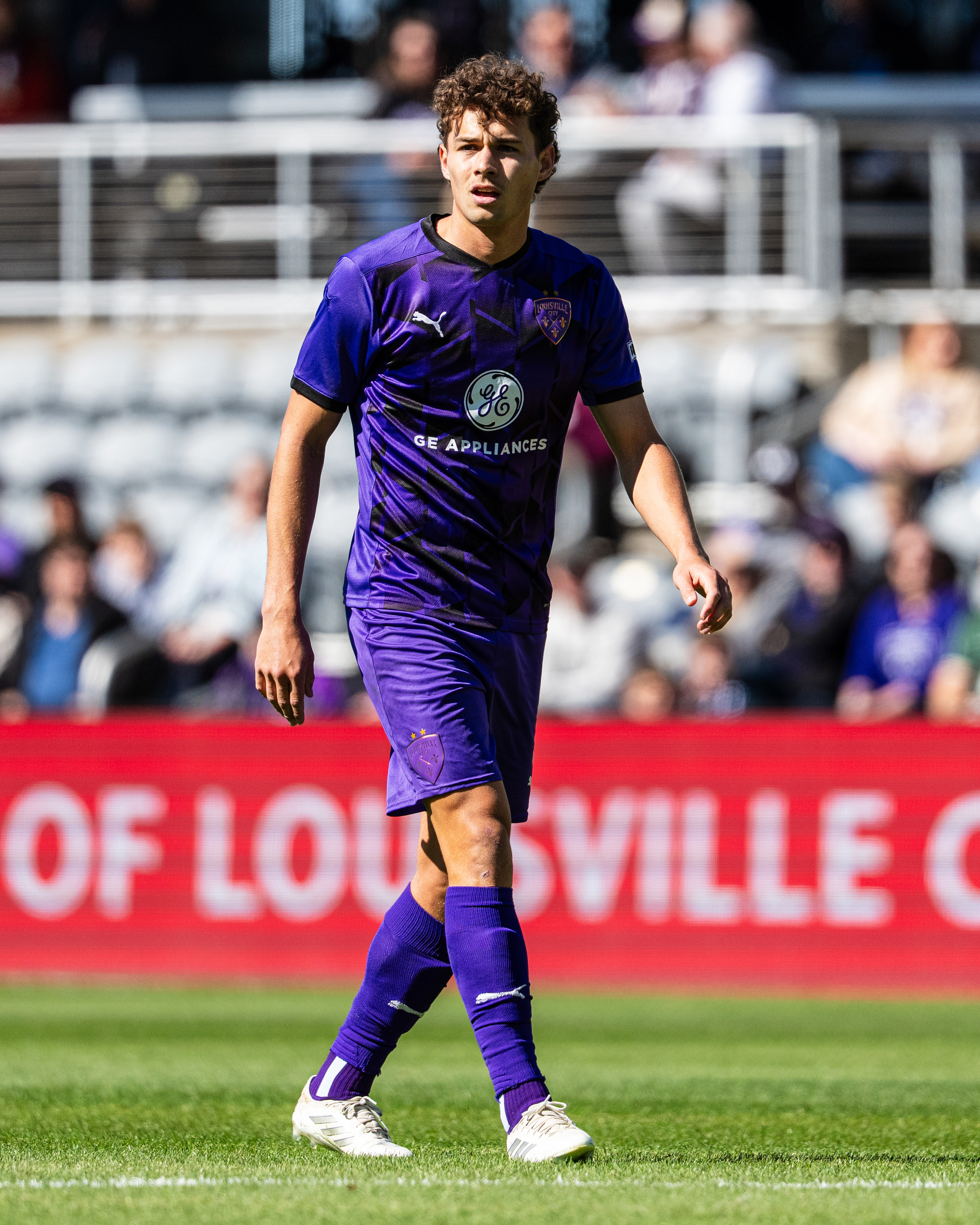
- Duncan with Louisville City in 2025

Personal information
- Full name: Zachary Duncan
- Date of birth: 31 May 2000 (age 26)
- Place of birth: Marayong, New South Wales, Australia
- Height: 1.83 m (6 ft 0 in)
- Position: Midfielder

Team information
- Current team: Louisville City FC
- Number: 6

Youth career
- 2012: Marconi Stallions
- 2013–2014: Sydney Olympic
- 2015: FNSW NTC
- 2016: Sydney FC
- 2017: Western Sydney Wanderers
- 2018: Brisbane Roar

Senior career*
Years	Team	Apps	(Gls)
2018–2019	Brisbane Roar NPL	8	(1)
2019	Brisbane Roar	4	(1)
2019	Marconi Stallions	0	(0)
2019–2023	AGF	24	(0)
2022–2023	→ Perth Glory (loan)	24	(1)
2024	Memphis 901	33	(1)
2025–	Louisville City FC	27	(3)

International career^{‡}
2019–2020	Australia U23	7	(1)
Medal record
Men's football
Representing Australia
AFC U-23 Asian Cup
Third place	2020 Thailand	U-23 Team
- * Club domestic league appearances and goals as of October 31, 2026 ‡ National team caps and goals as of 26 January 2020

Zachary Duncan (born 31 May 2000) is an Australian professional soccer player who plays as a midfielder for Louisville City FC of the USL Championship.

== Career ==
=== Brisbane Roar ===
Duncan was part of the 2018-19 Y-League Championship-winning Brisbane Roar Youth team. He started and played 62 minutes as the Young Roar beat Western Sydney Wanderers Youth 3–1 in the 2019 Y-League Grand Final on 1 February 2019.

Duncan made his first professional appearance as a second-half substitute in the Roar's 2–1 loss to Melbourne Victory in Round 22 of the 2018–19 season. On 20 April 2019, Duncan scored his first goal for the Brisbane Roar in a 6–1 loss to the Newcastle Jets at Suncorp Stadium.

=== AGF Aarhus ===
On 17 June 2019, after a brief trial period in which he scored for the AGF reserve team, it was announced that Duncan had signed a four-year contract with the Danish club AGF.

=== Memphis 901 FC ===
On 13 December 2023, it was announced that Duncan would join USL Championship side Memphis 901 on a permanent deal at the start of the 2024 season.

== International career ==
In November 2019, Duncan was called up for the Australia U-23 squad playing a series of 3 friendlies in Chongqing, China. He made two appearances and scored the opening goal against North Korea U-23 as Australia claimed the Dazu Cup, winning all 3 friendlies.

== Honours ==
Brisbane Roar

- Y-League: 2018–19
