= 2008 WA State Challenge Cup =

2008 Soccer Pools State Cup
WA State Challenge Cup

Tournament details
- Teams: 32

Final positions
- Champions: Western Knights

Western Australian soccer clubs from the top three State-Based Divisions competed in 2008 for the WA State Challenge Cup, known that year as the Soccer Pools State Cup. This knockout competition was won by Western Knights, their second title.

== First round ==
All matches were completed by 6 April 2008. A total of 32 teams took part in this stage of the competition. All 12 Clubs from the State League Premier Division and Football West State League Division 1, and 8 clubs from the Amateur Premier League (the top 8 out of 12 from the previous year's league table) entered into the competition at this stage.

Tie no	Home team	Score	Away team
1	Stirling Lions	5–0	Gosnells City
2	Wanneroo City	2–0	Dianella White Eagles
3	Lynwood Colts	0–1	Forrestfield United
4	South West Phoenix	0–5	Mandurah City
5	Armadale	4–1	Balcatta
6	Floreat Athena	5–1	Canning City
7	Cockburn City	2–3	Sorrento
8	Perth	8–0	Murdoch University

Tie no	Home team	Score	Away team
9	Rockingham City	0–2	Fremantle Spirit
10	Queen's Park	0–2	Southern Spirit
11	Bayswater City	1–0	Shamrock Rovers
12	Morley-Windmills	1–0	Ashfield
13	Western Knights	7–0	Perth Azzurri
14	Inglewood United	2–1	Swan IC
15	Spearwood Dalmatinac	0–2	Hamersley Rovers
16	Fremantle United	1–2	ECU Joondalup

== Second round ==
A total of 16 teams took part in this stage of the competition. All matches were completed by 17 May.

Tie no	Home team	Score	Away team
1	Sorrento	3–0	Wanneroo City
2	Perth	2–1	Inglewood United
3	Fremantle Spirit	1–0	Armadale
4	Hamersley Rovers	3–2	Bayswater City

Tie no	Home team	Score	Away team
5	Southern Spirit	1–4	Forrestfield United
6	Floreat Athena	2–1	Mandurah City
7	Morley-Windmills	1–4	Western Knights
8	Stirling Lions	3 – 3 (0–3 (p))	ECU Joondalup

== Quarter finals ==
A total of 8 teams took part in this stage of the competition. All matches in this round were completed on 21 June.

Tie no	Home team	Score	Away team
1	Perth	0–3	Western Knights
2	ECU Joondalup	1–0	Floreat Athena
3	Sorrento	6–0	Forrestfield United
4	Hamersley Roverss	1–0	Fremantle Spirit

== Semi finals ==
A total of 4 teams took part in this stage of the competition. Both matches in this round were completed on 20 August.

Tie no	Home team	Score	Away team
1	Hamersley Rovers	0–1	Sorrento
2	Western Knights	2–0	ECU Joondalup

== Final ==
The 2008 soccer Pools Cup Final was held on 4 October, and won by Western Knights, their second title.

4 October 2008	Sorrento	1–2	Western Knights	Dorrien Gardens
		Report
