= 2011 WA State Challenge Cup =

2011 State League Cup
WA State Challenge Cup

Tournament details
- Teams: 32

Final positions
- Champions: Sorrento

Western Australian soccer clubs from the top three State-Based Divisions competed in 2011 for the WA State Challenge Cup, known that year as the State League Cup. This knockout competition was won by Sorrento, their first title.

== First round ==
A total of 32 teams took part in this stage of the competition. All 12 Clubs from the State League Premier Division and Football West State League Division 1, and 8 clubs from the Sunday League (Premier Division) entered into the competition at this stage. All matches were completed by 30 March 2011.

The draw was as follows:

Tie no	Home team (tier)	Score	Away team (tier)
1	Rockingham City (3)	w/o	Queens Park (4)
2	Melville City (4)	3–2	Wanneroo City (3)
3	Stirling Lions (2)	5–0	Spearwood Dalmatinac (4)
4	Forrestfield United (3)	1–4	Sorrento (2)
5	Canning City (3)	0–6	Dianella White Eagles (3)
6	Swan United (3)	1–3	Western Knights (2)
7	UWA-Nedlands (4)	4–2	Bunbury Forum Force (3)
8	Shamrock Rovers Perth (3)	6–0	Belmont Villa (4)

Tie no	Home team (tier)	Score	Away team (tier)
9	Balcatta (2)	5–0	Bayswater City (2)
10	Morley Windmills (3)	1–2	Gosnells City (3)
11	Olympic Kingsway (4)	3–2	Fremantle Spirit (3)
12	Inglewood United (2)	4–4 (2–3 (p))	Cockburn City (2)
13	Fremantle Croatia (4)	0–8	Perth (2)
14	Armadale (2)	4–1	Joondalup United (4)
15	Mandurah City (2)	2–1	ECU Joondalup (2)
16	Floreat Athena (2)	4–3	Ashfield (3)

== Second round ==
A total of 16 teams took part in this stage of the competition. All matches were completed by 27 April 2011.

The draw was as follows:

Tie no	Home team (tier)	Score	Away team (tier)
1	UWA-Nedlands (4)	2–4	Western Knights (2)
2	Dianella White Eagles (3)	1–2	Shamrock Rovers Perth (3)
3	Armadale (2)	2–1	Floreat Athena (2)
4	Rockingham City (3)	1–2	Mandurah City (2)

Tie no	Home team (tier)	Score	Away team (tier)
5	Stirling Lions (2)	4–0	Melville City (4)
6	Stirling Lions (2)	7–2	Gosnells City (3)
7	Balcatta (2)	4–2	Cockburn City (2)
8	Olympic Kingsway (4)	0–6	Perth (2)

== Quarter finals ==
A total of 8 teams took part in this stage of the competition. All matches in this round were completed on 6 June 2011.

The draw was as follows:

Tie no	Home team (tier)	Score	Away team (tier)
1	Shamrock Rovers Perth (3)	1–2	Sorrento (2)
2	Mandurah City (2)	1–2	Perth (2)
3	Stirling Lions (2)	1–4	Armadale (2)
4	Western Knights (2)	3–2	Balcatta (2)

== Semi finals ==
A total of 4 teams took part in this stage of the competition. All matches in this round were completed by 10 July 2011.

The draw was as follows:

Tie no	Home team (tier)	Score	Away team (tier)
1	Perth (2)	2–1	Western Knights (2)
2	Armadale (2)	0–3	Stirling Lions (2)

== Final ==
The 2011 State League Cup Final was held at the neutral venue of Macedonia Park on 25 August.

24 August 2011	Perth	0–1 (a.e.t.)	Sorrento	Macedonia Park
			Kilkelly 111' (o.g.)
