= 2017 Football West season =

Football West Season 2017
- League: National Premier Leagues Western Australia
- Sport: Association football
- Duration: 2017

NPL WA League Season
- Champions: Bayswater City
- Premiers: Bayswater City

State Cup
- Cup Winners: Western Knights

Football West seasons
- ← 2016 2018 →

The 2017 Football West season was the 117th season of competitive association football in Western Australia and the fourth season since the establishment of the National Premier Leagues WA (NPL).

NPL premier Bayswater City qualified for the National Premier Leagues finals series, and were eliminated at the quarter-final stage.

== Pre-season changes ==
2016 League	Promoted to league	Relegated from league
NPL WA	Joondalup United; Mandurah City	–
State League 1	Fremantle City; Joondalup City	Shamrock Rovers Perth
State League 2	Gwelup Croatia	Ellenbrook United SC
Women's State League	Bassendean Caledonians	Quinns; Melville City (withdrew)

== League tables ==
=== 2017 National Premier Leagues WA ===
The 2017 National Premier Leagues WA season was played over 26 rounds commencing in February 2017, followed by a Top 4 Finals series. A revised Relegation system for the bottom team will depend on whether the two Division 1 teams that meet NPL WA eligibility criteria finish in the top 4 of the league season. If either come first, the bottom team will be relegated, but if one comes second, third or fourth, then there will be a promotion/relegation playoff.

Pos	Team	Pld	W	D	L	GF	GA	GD	Pts	Qualification or relegation
1	Bayswater City (C)	26	17	5	4	55	33	+22	56	2017 National Premier Leagues Finals
2	Inglewood United	26	16	7	3	73	33	+40	55	2017 Western Australia Finals
3	Perth SC	26	17	3	6	62	30	+32	54	2017 Western Australia Finals
4	Sorrento	26	14	5	7	53	34	+19	47	2017 Western Australia Finals
5	Floreat Athena	26	14	5	7	42	31	+11	47	
6	ECU Joondalup	26	11	6	9	56	43	+13	39	
7	Stirling Lions	26	10	5	11	40	43	−3	35	
8	Subiaco AFC	26	11	2	13	39	48	−9	35	
9	Cockburn City	26	8	7	11	38	42	−4	31	
10	Joondalup United	26	8	7	11	46	60	−14	31	
11	Armadale	26	7	6	13	34	51	−17	27	
12	Perth Glory Youth	26	5	4	17	28	49	−21	19	
13	Balcatta	26	5	4	17	25	54	−29	19	
14	Mandurah City (R)	26	3	6	17	21	61	−40	15	Qualification to the 2017 relegation play-off

Source: sportstg.com
Rules for classification: 1) points; 2) goal difference; 3) number of goals scored.
(C) Champions; (R) Relegated

==== Finals ====
The Top Four Cup, known as the McInerney Ford Top Four Cup for sponsorship reasons, was played as a finals competition at the conclusion of the regular season.

Semi-finals
1	Bayswater City	4
2	Inglewood United	1
3	Perth	4
4	Sorrento	1

Elimination final
2	Inglewood United	0
3	Perth	3

Grand final
1	Bayswater City	3
3	Perth	0

==== Promotion/relegation play-off ====
As both Forrestfield United and South West Phoenix met the requirement criteria for NPL WA eligibility, if either came first in the league then they would be promoted to the 2018 NPL Western Australia. But as neither came first, then Forrestfield as the highest of the two – that came either second, third or fourth – played a two-legged Promotion and relegation play-off against Mandurah City.

20 September 2017

Forrestfield United	3–0	Mandurah City

23 September 2017

Mandurah City	3–3	Forrestfield United

Forrestfield United won 6–3 on aggregate, and promoted to the NPLWA in 2018.

=== 2017 WA State League Division 1 ===
Football West State League Division 1
- Season: 2017
- Champions: Western Knights
- Promoted: Forrestfield United
- Relegated: Canning City
- Top goalscorer: –

The 2017 Season is for the second tier domestic football competition in Western Australia. Western Knights were champions, having won the league with one week to spare.

Pos	Team	Pld	W	D	L	GF	GA	GD	Pts	Qualification or relegation
1	Western Knights (C)	20	13	3	4	47	16	+31	42	
2	Forrestfield United (P)	20	11	5	4	48	28	+20	38	Qualification to the 2017 promotion play-offs
3	Dianella White Eagles	20	10	7	3	46	26	+20	37	
4	South West Phoenix	20	11	4	5	44	31	+13	37	
5	Fremantle City	20	9	3	8	38	39	−1	30	
6	UWA-Nedlands	19	8	5	6	37	30	+7	29	
7	Ashfield	20	8	1	11	40	46	−6	25	
8	Joondalup City	19	8	1	10	31	42	−11	25	
9	Rockingham City	20	6	6	8	35	38	−3	24	
10	Gosnells City (R)	20	4	3	13	25	44	−19	15	Qualification to the 2017 relegation play-offs
11	Canning City (R)	20	1	2	17	22	73	−51	5	Relegation to the 2018 State League Division 2

Source: sportstg.com
Rules for classification: 1) points; 2) goal difference; 3) number of goals scored.
(C) Champions; (P) Promoted; (R) Relegated

==== Promotion/relegation play-off ====
Round 1; 23 September, 26 September
SL1 10	Gosnells City	3	3	3
SL2 4	Swan United	0	1	1
SL2 2	Morley-Windmills	1	4	5
SL2 3	Wanneroo City	0	0	0

Round 2; 30 September, 5 October
SL1 10	Gosnells City	1	2	3
SL2 2	Morley-Windmills	3	4	7

Morley-Windmills won 7–4 on aggregate, and promoted to the 2018 State League Division 1.

=== 2017 WA State League Division 2 ===
Football West State League Division 2
- Season: 2017
- Champions: Gwelup Croatia
- Promoted: Gwelup Croatia

The 2017 WA State League Division 2 Season was the third tier domestic football competition in Western Australia. The top team at the end of the year was promoted to the 2018 WA State League Division 1, with the second, third and fourth teams qualifying to a two-round promotion/relegation playoff.

Pos	Team	Pld	W	D	L	GF	GA	GD	Pts	Qualification or relegation
1	Gwelup Croatia (C, P)	20	16	2	2	79	15	+64	50	Promotion to the 2018 State League Division 1
2	Morley-Windmills (P)	20	11	4	5	48	32	+16	37	Qualification to the 2017 promotion play-offs
3	Wanneroo City	20	10	3	7	42	33	+9	33	Qualification to the 2017 promotion play-offs
4	Swan United	20	10	2	8	55	49	+6	32	Qualification to the 2017 promotion play-offs
5	Kelmscott Roos	20	10	1	9	42	58	−16	31	
6	Olympic Kingsway	20	8	5	7	34	31	+3	29	
7	Melville City	20	8	4	8	38	33	+5	28	
8	Quinns	20	7	4	9	39	41	−2	25	
9	Curtin University	20	5	6	9	28	36	−8	21	
10	Balga	20	5	2	13	26	57	−31	17	
11	Shamrock Rovers	20	3	1	16	23	69	−46	10	

Source: sportstg.com
Rules for classification: 1) points; 2) goal difference; 3) number of goals scored.
(C) Champions; (P) Promoted

=== 2017 Women's State League Premier Division ===
(Western Australia) Football West Women's State League
- Season: 2017
- Champions: Queen's Park FC

The highest tier domestic football competition in Western Australia is known as the BankWest Women's State League Premier Division for sponsorship reasons. The 7 teams play each other three times, for a total of 18 matches over 21 rounds.

Pos	Team	Pld	W	D	L	GF	GA	GD	Pts	Qualification or relegation
1	Queen's Park FC (C)	18	16	1	1	77	14	+63	49	
2	Northern Redbacks	18	13	3	2	61	19	+42	42	
3	Football West NTC U-19	18	7	3	8	41	35	+6	24	
4	Balcatta	17	7	3	7	33	27	+6	24	
5	East Fremantle	18	4	7	7	32	42	−10	19	
6	Beckenham Angels	17	2	4	11	19	69	−50	10	
7	Bassendean Caledonians (R)	18	1	3	14	24	81	−57	6	Qualification to the 2017 relegation play-offs

Source: sportstg.com
Rules for classification: 1) points; 2) goal difference; 3) number of goals scored.
(C) Champions; (R) Relegated

==== Promotion/relegation play-off ====
27 September 2017

Stirling Panthers SC	1–1	Bassendean Caledonians

1 October 2017

Bassendean Caledonians	2–1	Stirling Panthers SC

Bassendean Caledonians won 3–2 on aggregate, but were still not a part of the Women’s Premier League in 2018.

== 2017 State Cup ==
Western Australian soccer clubs competed in 2017 for the Football West State Cup. Clubs entered from the National Premier Leagues WA, the two divisions of the State League, a limited number of teams from various divisions of the 2017 Amateur League competition, and from regional teams from the South West, Goldfields, and Great Southern regions.

This knockout competition was won by Western Knights, their third title.

The competition also served as the Western Australian Preliminary rounds for the 2017 FFA Cup. In addition to the A-League club Perth Glory, the two finalists – Sorrento FC and Western Knights – qualified for the final rounds, entering at the Round of 32.
