= 2009 WA State Challenge Cup =

2009 Soccer Pools State Cup
WA State Challenge Cup

Tournament details
- Teams: 32

Final positions
- Champions: Floreat Athena

Western Australian soccer clubs from the top three State-Based Divisions competed in 2009 for the WA State Challenge Cup, known that year as the Soccer Pools State Cup. This knockout competition was won by Floreat Athena, their fifth title.

== First round ==
All matches were completed by 29 March. A total of 32 teams took part in this stage of the competition. All 12 Clubs from the State League Premier Division and Football West State League Division 1, and 8 clubs from the Sunday League Premier Division (the top 8 out of 12 from the previous year's league table) entered into the competition at this stage.

Tie no	Home team	Score	Away team
1	Arena Joondalup United	0–2	Fremantle Spirit
2	South West Phoenix	3–2	Kingsway Olympic
3	Rockingham City	0–10	Western Knights
4	Sorrento	5–1	Murdoch University
5	Canning City	3–1	Mandurah City
6	Dianella White Eagles	0–3	Shamrock Rovers
7	Fremantle United	0–1	Perth
8	Inglewood United	2–1	UWA

Tie no	Home team	Score	Away team
9	Spearwood Dalmatinac	2–2 (3–1 (p))	Queen's Park
10	ECU Joondalup	2–0	Cockburn City
11	Forrestfield United	0–1	Gosnells City
12	Ashfield	0–2	Morley Windmills
13	Bayswater City	0–3	Balcatta
14	Floreat Athena	4–1	Swan United
15	Hamersley Rovers	0–5	Armadale
16	Stirling Lions	2–1	Wanneroo City

== Second round ==
A total of 16 teams took part in this stage of the competition. All matches were completed by 31 May.

Tie no	Home team	Score	Away team
1	Sorrento	2–3	Stirling Lions
2	South West Phoenix	1–1 (5–4 (p))	Fremantle Spirit
3	Morley Windmills	1–4	Shamrock Rovers
4	ECU Joondalup	1–4	Perth

Tie no	Home team	Score	Away team
5	Inglewood United	1–0	Gosnells City
6	Armadale	1–1 (5–4 (p))	Canning City
7	Balcatta	1–6	Western Knights
8	Spearwood Dalmatinac	0–1	Floreat Athena

== Quarter finals ==
A total of 8 teams took part in this stage of the competition. All matches in this round were completed on 4 July.

Tie no	Home team	Score	Away team
1	Perth	4–5	Stirling Lions
2	Western Knights	4–0	South West Phoenix
3	Armadale	1–2	Floreat Athena
4	Inglewood United	4–3	Shamrock Rovers

== Semi finals ==
A total of 4 teams took part in this stage of the competition. All matches in this round were completed by 15 August.

Tie no	Home team	Score	Away team
1	Stirling Lions	0–1	Floreat Athena
2	Western Knights	2–3	Inglewood United

== Final ==
The 2009 State League Cup Final was held at the neutral venue of Dorrien Gardens on 4 October.

4 October 2009	Floreat Athena	3–1	Inglewood United	Dorrien Gardens
		Report
