= 2010 WA State Challenge Cup =

2010 State League Cup
WA State Challenge Cup

Tournament details
- Teams: 32

Final positions
- Champions: Stirling Lions

Western Australian soccer clubs from the top three State-Based Divisions competed in 2010 for the WA State Challenge Cup, known that year as the State League Cup.

This knockout competition was won by Stirling Lions, their sixth title.

== First round ==
A total of 32 teams took part in this stage of the competition. All 12 Clubs from the State League Premier Division and Football West State League Division 1, and 8 clubs from the Sunday League (Premier Division) (the top 8 out of 12 from the previous year's league table) entered into the competition at this stage. All matches were completed by 26 April 2010.

The draw was as follows:

| Tie no | Home team | Score | Away team |
|---|---|---|---|
| 1 | Rockingham City | 1–3 | Morley Windmills |
| 2 | Murdoch University SC | 1–3 | Olympic Kingsway |
| 3 | Wanneroo City | 0–5 | Perth |
| 4 | Forrestfield United | 3–5 | ECU Joondalup |
| 5 | Shamrock Rovers Perth | 3–3 (3–5 (p)) | Ashfield |
| 6 | Sorrento | 7–1 | Spearwood Dalmatinac |
| 7 | Stirling Lions | 10–1 | Queen's Park |
| 8 | Subiaco AFC | 1–3 | Bayswater City |

| Tie no | Home team | Score | Away team |
|---|---|---|---|
| 9 | South West Phoenix | 6–0 | Fremantle United |
| 10 | Floreat Athena | 8–0 | Gosnells City |
| 11 | Armadale | 6–0 | UWA-Nedlands |
| 12 | Dianella White Eagles | 1–4 | Cockburn City |
| 13 | Mandurah City | 3–0 | Canning City |
| 14 | Inglewood United | 1–3 | Balcatta |
| 15 | Fremantle Spirit | 0–8 | Western Knights |
| 16 | Swan United | 3–0 | Stirling Panthers |

== Second round ==
A total of 16 teams took part in this stage of the competition. All matches were completed by 7 June 2010.

The draw was as follows:

| Tie no | Home team | Score | Away team |
|---|---|---|---|
| 1 | Sorrento | 4–1 | Olympic Kingsway |
| 2 | Western Knights | 1–1 (4–5 (p)) | Armadale |
| 3 | Perth | 0–4 | Balcatta |
| 4 | Morley Windmills | 2–3 | Swan United |

| Tie no | Home team | Score | Away team |
|---|---|---|---|
| 5 | South West Phoenix | 3–2 | ECU Joondalup |
| 6 | Cockburn City | 1–0 | Bayswater City |
| 7 | Ashfield | 1–5 | Floreat Athena |
| 8 | Stirling Lions | 2–0 | Mandurah City |

== Quarter finals ==
A total of 8 teams took part in this stage of the competition. All matches in this round were completed on 3 July 2010.

The draw was as follows:

| Tie no | Home team | Score | Away team |
|---|---|---|---|
| 1 | Armadale | 3–2 | Cockburn City |
| 2 | Balcatta | 0–2 | Stirling Lions |
| 3 | Floreat Athena | 3–0 | Sorrento |
| 4 | Swan United | 3–1 | South West Phoenix |

== Semi finals ==
A total of 4 teams took part in this stage of the competition. All matches in this round were completed by 25 July 2010.

The draw was as follows:

| Tie no | Home team | Score | Away team |
|---|---|---|---|
| 1 | Stirling Lions | 4–0 | Swan United |
| 2 | Floreat Athena | 6–0 | Armadale |

== Final ==
The 2010 State League Cup Final was held at the neutral venue of Frank Drago Reserve on 22 August.

| 22 August 2010 | Stirling Lions | 2–1 | Floreat Athena | Frank Drago Reserve |
| | Pugliese 4' (o.g.); Boi 32' | | Arnold 1' |
