= 2012 WA State Challenge Cup =

2012 State League Cup
WA State Challenge Cup

Tournament details
- Teams: 41

Final positions
- Champions: Sorrento

Western Australian soccer clubs from the top three State-Based Divisions, plus the Premier Division of the Sunday League, competed in 2012 for the WA State Challenge Cup, known that year as the State League Cup 2012. This knockout competition was won by Sorrento, their 2nd title.

== Preliminary round ==
A total of 30 Western Australian teams took part in this stage of the competition. This involved 13 clubs from the State League Division 1, 7 clubs from the State League Division 2 and 10 clubs from the 2013 Sunday League (Premier Division). A total of 12 teams were given a bye to the first round. All matches in this round were completed on 9 April 2012.

The draw was as follows:

Tie no	Home team (tier)	Score	Away team (tier)
1	Joondalup United (5)	0–1	Wanneroo City (3)
2	Kingsley SC (5)	3–3 (4–1 (p))	Fremantle Spirit (3)
3	Olympic Kingsway (4)	0–2	Cockburn City (3)
4	Belmont Villa (5)	0–4	Swan United (3)
5	Quinns FC (4)	0–2	Hamersley Rovers (5)

Tie no	Home team (tier)	Score	Away team (tier)
6	Forrestfield United (3)	0–1	Rockingham City (3)
7	Joondalup City (4)	0–3	Mandurah City (3)
8	Southern Spirit (5)	1–2	Canning City (3)
9	North Perth United (5)	1 – 1 (3–1 (p))	BB United (5)

- Byes: Ashfield (3), Dianella White Eagles (3), Fremantle Croatia (5), Fremantle United (4), Gosnells City (3), Melville City (4), Morley-Windmills (3), Shamrock Rovers Perth (3), South Perth United (5), Subiaco AFC (4), UWA-Nedlands (4) and Whitfords City (5).

== First round ==
A total of 32 teams took part in this stage of the competition. 11 of the 12 Clubs from the State League Premier Division entered into the competition at this stage, with the exception of the Football West NTC team, who did not take part. All matches were completed on 25 April 2012.

The draw was as follows:

Tie no	Home team (tier)	Score	Away team (tier)
1	Inglewood United (2)	3–0	Dianella White Eagles (3)
2	Shamrock Rovers Perth (3)	2–1	UWA-Nedlands(4)
3	Hamersley Rovers (5)	2–0	Ashfield (3)
4	South Perth United (5)	0–4	Floreat Athena (2)
5	Kingsley SC (5)	5–3	Morley-Windmills (3)
6	Bayswater City (2)	0–0 (3–4 (p))	Stirling Lions (2)
7	Balcatta (2)	2–0	Fremantle Croatia (5)
8	Canning City (3)	0–2	ECU Joondalup (2)

Tie no	Home team (tier)	Score	Away team (tier)
9	Mandurah City (3)	1–2	Perth (2)
10	Melville City (4)	1–0	Fremantle United (4)
11	Bunbury Forum Force (2)	4–6	Wanneroo City (3)
12	Sorrento (2)	3–2	Cockburn City (3)
13	Subiaco AFC (4)	1–1 (4–5 (p))	Western Knights (2)
14	Swan United (3)	3–1	Gosnells City (3)
15	Whitfords City (5)	0–4	Rockingham City (3)
16	North Perth United (5)	5–9	Armadale (2)

== Second round ==
A total of 16 teams took part in this stage of the competition. All matches were completed on 12 May 2012.

The draw was as follows:

Tie no	Home team (tier)	Score	Away team (tier)
1	Perth (2)	4–1	Western Knights (2)
2	Kingsley SC (5)	3–5	Hamersley Rovers (5)
3	Balcatta (2)	5–1	Shamrock Rovers Perth (3)
4	Rockingham City (3)	2–3	Floreat Athena (2)

Tie no	Home team (tier)	Score	Away team (tier)
5	Melville City (4)	3–2	Armadale (2)
6	Sorrento (2)	2–0	ECU Joondalup (2)
7	Swan United (3)	1–5	Inglewood United (2)
8	Wanneroo City (3)	3–1	Stirling Lions (2)

== Quarter finals ==
A total of 8 teams took part in this stage of the competition. All matches in this round were completed on 4 June 2012.

The draw was as follows:

Tie no	Home team (tier)	Score	Away team (tier)
1	Floreat Athena (2)	4–1	Hamersley Rovers (5)
2	Balcatta (2)	2–1	Perth (2)
3	Sorrento (2)	6–0	Melville City (4)
4	Wanneroo City (3)	0–3	Inglewood United (2)

== Semi finals ==
A total of 4 teams took part in this stage of the competition. All matches in this round were completed by 30 July 2012. The draw was as follows:

Tie no	Home team (tier)	Score	Away team (tier)
1	Sorrento (2)	6–0	Floreat Athena (2)
2	Inglewood United (2)	1–4	Balcatta (2)

== Final ==
The 2012 State League Cup Final was held at the neutral venue of Dorrien Gardens on 24 August.

25 August 2012	Sorrento	4–3 (a.e.t.)	Balcatta	Dorrien Gardens
2:30 PM	Martin 7', 20'; T.Harnwell 66'; Platten 114'	Report	Atak 35'; Berrera 63'; Thackray 74'	Attendance: ~2,500
