= 2013 WA State Challenge Cup =

2013 Cool Ridge Cup
WA State Challenge Cup

Tournament details
- Teams: 41

Final positions
- Champions: Bayswater City

Western Australian soccer clubs from the top three State-Based Divisions, plus the Premier Division of the Sunday League, competed in 2013 for the WA State Challenge Cup, known for sponsorship reasons as the Cool Ridge Cup. This knockout competition was won by Bayswater City, their first title.

== Preliminary round ==
A total of 30 Western Australian teams took part in this stage of the competition. It involved 12 clubs from the State League Division 1, 8 clubs from the State League Division 2 and 10 clubs from the 2013 Sunday League (Premier Division). All matches in this round were completed on 1 April. The draw was as follows:

Tie no	Home team (tier)	Score	Away team (tier)
1	Swan United (3)	3–1	Wanneroo City (3)
2	Mandurah City (3)	3–0	Fremantle United (4)
3	Gosnells City (3)	4–3 (a.e.t.)	Hamersley Rovers (5)
4	Western Knights (3)	4–1	North Perth United (5)
5	Forrestfield United (4)	3–6	Olympic Kingsway (4)

Tie no	Home team (tier)	Score	Away team (tier)
6	Ashfield (3)	7–0	South Perth United(5)
7	Kingsley SC(5)	0–3	Maddington White City (4)
8	Morley-Windmills (3)	2–3	Rockingham City (4)
9	Whitfords City (5)	1–2	Subiaco AFC (4)

- Byes: BB United (5), Canning City (3), Dianella White Eagles (3), Fremantle Croatia (5), Joondalup City (4), Joondalup United (5), Melville City (4), Quinns FC (4), Shamrock Rovers Perth (3), Southern Spirit (5) and UWA-Nedlands (3),

== First round ==
A total of 32 teams took part in this stage of the competition. 11 of the 12 Clubs from the State League Premier Division entered into the competition at this stage, with the exception of the Football West NTC team, who did not take part. All matches were completed by 28 April.

The draw was as follows:

Tie no	Home team (tier)	Score	Away team (tier)
1	Ashfield (3)	4–1	BB United (5)
2	Canning City (3)	0–2	Joondalup United (5)
3	Perth (2)	1–3	ECU Joondalup (2)
4	Floreat Athena (2)	3–0	Cockburn City (2)
5	Bayswater City	4–1	Shamrock Rovers Perth (3)
6	Balcatta (2)	0–1	Armadale (2)
7	Quinns FC (4)	3–2	Subiaco AFC (4)
8	Mandurah City (3)	2–1	UWA-Nedlands (3)

Tie no	Home team (tier)	Score	Away team (tier)
9	Inglewood United (2)	1–0	Dianella White Eagles (3)
10	Joondalup City (4)	0–2	Maddington White City (4)
11	Olympic Kingsway (4)	2–4	Gosnells City (3)
12	Melville City (4)	3–5	Swan United (3)
13	Stirling Lions (2)	4–3	Bunbury Forum Force (2)
14	Sorrento (2)	8–1	Gwelup Croatia (5)
15	Southern Spirit (5)	1–6	Rockingham City (4)
16	Western Knights (3)	10–1	Fremantle Croatia (5)

== Second round ==
A total of 16 teams took part in this stage of the competition. All matches were completed by 3 June.

The draw was as follows:

Tie no	Home team (tier)	Score	Away team (tier)
1	Armadale (2)	2–4	Inglewood United (2)
2	Floreat Athena (2)	0–3	Sorrento (2)
3	Bayswater City (2)	2–0	Gosnells City (3)
4	Quinns FC (4)	2–1	Rockingham City (4)

Tie no	Home team (tier)	Score	Away team (tier)
5	Mandurah City (3)	2–2 (4–1 (p))	Maddington White City (4)
6	Stirling Lions (2)	4–2	ECU Joondalup (2)
7	Western Knights (3)	4–5	Ashfield (3)
8	Swan United (3)	7–1	Joondalup United (5)

== Quarter finals ==
A total of 8 teams took part in this stage of the competition. All matches in this round were completed by 22 June.

The draw was as follows:

Tie no	Home team (tier)	Score	Away team (tier)
1	Ashfield (3)	1–0	Stirling Lions (2)
2	Swan United (3)	2–1	Mandurah City (3)
3	Bayswater City (2)	7–0	Quinns FC (4)
4	Sorrento (2)	0–2	Inglewood United (2)

== Semi finals ==
A total of 4 teams took part in this stage of the competition. All matches in this round were completed by 20 July. The draw was as follows:

Tie no	Home team (tier)	Score	Away team (tier)
1	Ashfield (3)	3–2	Swan United (3)
2	Bayswater City (2)	5–1	Inglewood United (2)

== Final ==
The 2013 Cool Ridge Cup Final was held at the neutral venue of Litis Stadium on 24 August.

24 August 2013	Ashfield	0–1	Bayswater City	Litis Stadium
14:30		Source	Burton 83'	Attendance: 2,750 (approximate); Referee: Adam Fielding
