= 2015 WA State Challenge Cup =

2015 Cool Ridge Cup
WA State Challenge Cup

Tournament details
- Teams: 61

Final positions
- Champions: Sorrento FC (3rd title)

Western Australian soccer clubs competed in 2015 for the Football West State Cup, known for sponsorship reasons as the Cool Ridge Cup. Clubs entered from the National Premier Leagues WA, the two divisions of the State League, a limited number of teams from various divisions of the 2015 Amateur League competition, and from regional teams invited from the South West, Goldfields, Great Southern and Midwest regions. This knockout competition was won by Sorrento FC, their third title.

The competition also served as the Western Australian Preliminary Rounds for the 2015 FFA Cup. The two finalists – Perth SC and Sorrento FC – qualified for the final rounds, entering at the Round of 32.

== Schedule ==
A total of 61 teams took part in the competition, from Perth-based and regional-based competitions.

Round	Main dates	Number of fixtures	Clubs	New entries this round	Levels of new entrants
Round 2	14–15 Mar	8 + 7 byes	61 → 53	23	Amateur League lower Divisions; regional teams from Midwest, Goldfields, Great Southern and South West Soccer Associations
Round 3	28–29 Mar	21	53 → 32	27	Football West State League Division 1; Football West State League Division 2; Amateur League Premier Division
Round 4	6 Apr	16	32 → 16	11	National Premier Leagues WA
Round 5	27 Apr	8	16 → 8	none	
Round 6	1 Jun	4	8 → 4	none	
Round 7	20–21 Jun	2	4 → 2	none	
Final	12 Sep	1	2 → 1	none	

== Second round ==
The round numbers conform to a common format throughout the 2015 FFA Cup preliminary rounds. A total of 23 teams took part in this stage of the competition, from lower divisions of the Amateur League, and from regional teams invited from the South West, Goldfields, Great Southern and Midwest regions. Matches in this round were played by 15 March 2015.

Tie no	Home team (tier)	Score	Away team (tier)
1	Batavia United (-)	0–3	Chapman Athletic (-)
2	Geraldton Rovers (-)	1–3	Olympic Heat (-)
3	Twin City Saints (-)	2–1	Boulder City (-)
4	North Lake Espanyol (6)	5–0	La Fiamma (7)

Tie no	Home team (tier)	Score	Away team (tier)
5	Margaret River (-)	0–2	Jaguar FC (7)
6	Bunbury Dynamos (-)	7–2	Albany Bayswater (-)
7	Challenger FC (-)	0–14	Ballajura AFC (7)
8	Cracovia White Eagles (8)	4–2	Carramar FC (7)

- Byes – Backpackers FC (8), Busselton SC, East Fremantle, Eaton Dardanup, Emerald FC, Maccabi SC (6), Perth Saints.

== Third round ==
A total of 42 teams took part in this stage of the competition. The draw took place on 16 March, featuring the 15 Qualifiers from the first round, and 27 new teams that enter at this round: Football West State League Division 1 (8 teams), Football West State League Division 2 (10 teams), Amateur League Premier Division (9 teams). Matches in this round were played by 29 March.

Tie no	Home team (tier)	Score	Away team (tier)
1	Ellenbrook United (4)	2–2 (4–5 (p))	Wanneroo City (4)
2	Ashfield (3)	4–0	Hamersley Rovers (5)
3	Curtin University (4)	4–1	Port Kennedy (5)
4	Joondalup United (3)	9–0	Olympic Heat (-)
5	Kelmscott Roos (4)	1–11	Gwelup Croatia (5)
6	Olympic Kingsway (4)	1–2	Swan United (3)
7	Melville City (4)	7–1	Twin City Saints (-)
8	South West Phoenix (3)	4–0	Bunbury Dynamos (-)
9	Balga SC (4)	1–2	Kingsley SC (5)
10	UWA-Nedlands (3)	5–0	Eaton Dardanup (-)
11	Gosnells City (3)	0–6	Mandurah City (3)

Tie no	Home team (tier)	Score	Away team (tier)
12	Chapman Athletic (-)	0–5	North Lake Espanyol (6)
13	BB United (5)	3–1	Backpackers FC (8)
14	Emerald FC (-)	2–2 (4–5 (p))	Cracovia White Eagles (8)
15	Kwinana United (5)	1–2	Fremantle City (Note: Fremantle United Soccer Club and the East Fremantle Tricolore Soccer Club are now in a joint venture arrangement to form a new club called Fremantle City Football Club Two separate teams have entered into the FFA Cup competition.) (4)
16	Ballajura AFC (7)	1–4	Busselton SC (-)
17	Fremantle Croatia (5)	4–1	Jaguar FC (7)
18	Maccabi SC (6)	1–7	Rockingham City (4)
19	Perth Saints (-)	1–8	Shamrock Rovers Perth (3)
20	Whitfords City (6)	1–9	Joondalup City (4)
21	North Perth United (5)	4–1	East Fremantle (-)

== Fourth round ==
A total of 32 teams took part in this stage of the competition. 11 of the 12 Clubs from the National Premier Leagues WA entered into the competition at this stage, with the exception of Perth Glory Youth who were not eligible. The draw took place on 30 March. Matches in this round were played on 6 April.

Tie no	Home team (tier)	Score	Away team (tier)
1	Armadale (2)	2–1	Shamrock Rovers Perth (3)
2	Joondalup United (3)	0–2	Ashfield (3)
3	Busselton SC (-)	0–5	Bayswater City (2)
4	Gwelup Croatia (5)	6–0	Cracovia White Eagles (8)
5	Cockburn City (2)	11–1	North Lake Espanyol (6)
6	Floreat Athena (2)	0–3	Perth SC (2)
7	Balcatta (2)	2–1	Rockingham City (4)
8	Fremantle City (4)	3–1	Curtin University (4)

Tie no	Home team (tier)	Score	Away team (tier)
9	Inglewood United (2)	3–0	UWA-Nedlands (3)
10	Joondalup City (4)	3–1	Melville City (4)
11	Fremantle Croatia (5)	2–3	BB United (5)
12	Stirling Lions (2)	2–0	ECU Joondalup (2)
13	Sorrento (2)	8–2	North Perth United (5)
14	Kingsley SC (5)	3–4	Subiaco AFC (2)
15	Swan United (3)	4–4 (2–4 (p))	Mandurah City (3)
16	Wanneroo City (4)	0–2	South West Phoenix (3)

== Fifth round ==
A total of 16 teams took part in this stage of the competition. The draw was held on 7 April. Matches in this round were played on 27 April.

Tie no	Home team (tier)	Score	Away team (tier)
1	BB United (5)	1–2	Gwelup Croatia (5)
2	Cockburn City (2)	3–0	Ashfield (3)
3	Balcatta (2)	0–2	Subiaco AFC (2)
4	Fremantle City (4)	0–2	Perth SC (2)

Tie no	Home team (tier)	Score	Away team (tier)
5	Mandurah City (3)	6–4	Joondalup City (4)
6	Inglewood United (2)	0–2	Bayswater City (2)
7	South West Phoenix (3)	4–1	Armadale (2)
8	Sorrento (2)	5–1	Stirling Lions (2)

== Sixth round ==
A total of 8 teams took part in this stage of the competition. The draw took place on 28 April. Matches in this round were played on 1 June.

Tie no	Home team (tier)	Score	Away team (tier)
1	Cockburn City (2)	1–2	Bayswater City (2)
2	Perth SC (2)	1–0	Subiaco AFC (2)
3	Mandurah City (3)	1–4	Gwelup Croatia (5)
4	Sorrento (2)	4–0	South West Phoenix (3)

== Seventh round ==
A total of 4 teams took part in this stage of the competition. The draw took place on 2 June. Matches in this round were played by 21 June. The two victorious teams in this round qualify for the 2015 FFA Cup Round of 32.

Tie no	Home team (tier)	Score	Away team (tier)
1	Perth SC (2)	4–3	Gwelup Croatia (5)
2	Bayswater City (2)	1–1 (2–4 (p))	Sorrento FC (2)

== Final ==
The 2015 Cool Ridge Cup Final was played on 12 September, at the neutral venue of Inglewood Stadium.

12 September 2015	Perth SC	1–2	Sorrento	Inglewood Stadium
	Vittiglia 90'	Report	Hall 20'; Harnwell 31'	Referee: Adam Fielding
