= 2018 Football West season =

Football West Season 2018
- League: National Premier Leagues Western Australia
- Sport: Association football
- Duration: 2018

NPL WA Season
- Champions: Perth SC
- Premiers: Perth SC

State Cup
- Cup Winners: Armadale

Football West seasons
- ← 2017 2019 →

The 2018 Football West season was the 118th season of competitive association football in Western Australia and the fifth season since the establishment of the National Premier Leagues WA (NPL).

NPL premiers Perth SC qualified for the National Premier Leagues finals series.

== Pre-season changes ==
2017 League	Promoted to league	Relegated from league
NPL WA	Forrestfield United	Mandurah City
State League 1	Gwelup Croatia; Morley-Windmills	Canning City; Gosnells City
State League 2	–	–
Women's State League	Stirling Panthers; UWA-Nedlands	Bassendean Caledonians

== League Tables ==
=== 2018 National Premier Leagues WA ===
This was the last season using a 14-team format. The bottom 3 teams (which was subject to eligibility requirements) at the end of the season were relegated to the State League 1. Perth Glory Youth was ineligible to receive prize monies in the end of season Top 4 Cup competition.

Pos	Team	Pld	W	D	L	GF	GA	GD	Pts	Qualification or relegation
1	Perth SC (C)	26	17	4	5	55	26	+29	55	2018 National Premier Leagues Finals
2	Perth Glory Youth	26	16	6	4	72	32	+40	54	2018 Western Australia Finals
3	Cockburn City	26	14	6	6	59	40	+19	48	2018 Western Australia Finals
4	Bayswater City	26	15	2	9	55	30	+25	47	2018 Western Australia Finals
5	Inglewood United	26	13	7	6	50	38	+12	46	
6	ECU Joondalup	26	13	5	8	48	37	+11	44	
7	Floreat Athena	26	12	5	9	53	40	+13	41	
8	Sorrento	26	10	4	12	49	47	+2	34	
9	Stirling Lions	26	10	2	14	52	55	−3	32	
10	Armadale	26	9	5	12	48	52	−4	32	
11	Balcatta	26	9	2	15	40	59	−19	29	
12	Subiaco AFC (R)	26	7	5	14	29	46	−17	26	Relegation to the 2019 WA State League 1
13	Forrestfield United (R)	26	5	7	14	34	58	−24	22	Relegation to the 2019 WA State League 1
14	Joondalup United (R)	26	1	2	23	21	102	−81	5	Relegation to the 2019 WA State League 1

Source: sportstg.com
Rules for classification: 1) points; 2) goal difference; 3) number of goals scored.
(C) Champions; (R) Relegated

==== Finals ====
The Top Four Cup is played as a finals competition at the conclusion of the regular season.

Semi-finals
1	Perth SC	3 (3)
2	Perth Glory Youth	3 (4)
3	Cockburn City	3 (5)
4	Bayswater City	3 (4)

Elimination Final
1	Perth SC	2
3	Cockburn City	1

Grand Final
2	Perth Glory Youth	1
1	Perth SC	4

=== 2018 WA State League 1 ===
The 2018 WA State League 1 was composed of 11 teams playing 20 games over a 22-round season. Rockingham City as Champions were promoted to the National Premier Leagues WA, as they met eligibility criteria. The 9th and 10th placed clubs played in a two-legged promotion/relegation playoff, whilst the last placed team (Joondalup City) were directly relegated to State League Division Two.

Pos	Team	Pld	W	D	L	GF	GA	GD	Pts	Qualification or relegation
1	Rockingham City (C, P)	20	16	1	3	56	20	+36	49	Promotion to the 2019 National Premier Leagues WA
2	Gwelup Croatia	20	15	2	3	52	28	+24	47	
3	Fremantle City	20	9	3	8	39	40	−1	30	
4	Western Knights	20	8	5	7	38	42	−4	29	
5	Morley-Windmills	20	8	4	8	36	37	−1	28	
6	UWA-Nedlands	20	8	3	9	46	41	+5	27	
7	South West Phoenix	20	8	3	9	37	56	−19	27	
8	Ashfield	20	7	4	9	35	38	−3	25	
9	Dianella White Eagles (R)	20	6	4	10	31	37	−6	22	Qualification to the 2018 relegation play-offs
10	Mandurah City	20	4	3	13	30	44	−14	15	Qualification to the 2018 relegation play-offs
11	Joondalup City (R)	20	2	6	12	26	43	−17	12	Relegation to the 2019 WA State League 2

Source: sportstg.com
Rules for classification: 1) points; 2) goal difference; 3) number of goals scored.
(C) Champions; (P) Promoted; (R) Relegated

==== Promotion/relegation play-off ====
Semi-finals
SL1 9	Dianella White Eagles	2	0	2
SL2 3	Swan United	3	3	6
SL1 10	Mandurah City	2	3	5
SL2 2	Wanneroo City	1	3	4

Final
Mandurah City (p)	2	2	4 (5)
Swan United	1	3	4 (3)

=== 2018 WA State League 2 ===
The 2018 WA State League 2 was composed of 11 teams playing 20 games over a 22-round season.

Pos	Team	Pld	W	D	L	GF	GA	GD	Pts	Qualification or relegation
1	Olympic Kingsway (C, P)	20	16	4	0	63	17	+46	52	Promotion to the 2019 WA State League 1
2	Wanneroo City	20	17	1	2	54	20	+34	52	Qualification to the 2018 promotion play-offs
3	Swan United	20	11	4	5	39	27	+12	37	Qualification to the 2018 promotion play-offs
4	Balga	20	10	6	4	46	36	+10	36	
5	Murdoch University Melville	20	10	3	7	41	30	+11	33	
6	Quinns	20	8	1	11	32	38	−6	25	
7	Gosnells City	20	6	4	10	36	46	−10	22	
8	Shamrock Rovers	20	5	5	10	18	28	−10	20	
9	Curtin University	20	5	4	11	35	45	−10	19	
10	Canning City	20	3	2	15	18	56	−38	11	
11	Kelmscott Roos	20	1	2	17	11	50	−39	5	

Source: sportstg.com
Rules for classification: 1) points; 2) goal difference; 3) number of goals scored.
(C) Champions; (P) Promoted

=== 2018 Women's Premier League ===
BankWest Women's Premier League
- Season: 2018
- Champions: Balcatta

The highest tier domestic football competition in Western Australia is known as the BankWest Women's Premier League for sponsorship reasons. The 8 teams play each other three times, for a total of 21 matches over the regular season.

Pos	Team	Pld	W	D	L	GF	GA	GD	Pts	Qualification or relegation
1	Queen's Park FC	20	17	3	0	97	15	+82	54	Top Four Cup
2	Balcatta (C)	19	12	3	4	58	27	+31	39	Top Four Cup
3	Northern Redbacks	19	11	4	4	78	27	+51	37	Top Four Cup
4	Fremantle City	20	10	3	7	56	33	+23	33	Top Four Cup
5	Football West NTC U-19	20	9	4	7	63	26	+37	31	
6	Beckenham Angels	20	7	2	11	42	69	−27	23	Withdrew after end of season
7	Stirling Panthers	20	2	1	17	11	118	−107	7	
8	UWA-Nedlands (R)	20	1	0	19	15	105	−90	3	Relegated to Division 1

Source: sportstg.com
Rules for classification: 1) points; 2) goal difference; 3) number of goals scored.
(C) Champions; (R) Relegated

==== Top Four Cup ====
Semi-finals
1	Queen's Park FC	3
4	Fremantle City	1
2	Balcatta	2
3	Northern Redbacks	1

Grand Final
1	Queen's Park FC	0 (1)
2	Balcatta	0 (3)

== 2018 State Cup ==
Western Australian soccer clubs competed in 2018 for the Football West State Cup. Clubs entered from the National Premier Leagues WA, the two divisions of the State League, a limited number of teams from various divisions of the 2018 Amateur League competition, and from regional teams from the South West, Goldfields, and Great Southern regions.

This knockout competition was won by Armadale SC, their 1st title.

The competition also served as the Western Australian Preliminary rounds for the 2018 FFA Cup. In addition to the A-League club Perth Glory, the two finalists – Armadale and Gwelup Croatia – qualified for the final rounds, entering at the Round of 32.
