= Fremantle City FC (disambiguation) =

Fremantle City FC is a soccer club based in Fremantle, Western Australia.

Fremantle City FC may also refer to:

- Fremantle City, a club that competed in the top tier of Western Australian soccer. Also known as Benfica United, Fremantle Benfica and Fremantle Spirit. Later merged with Maddington Eagles, who are now part of Kalamunda City FC in the Football West State League.
- Fremantle City, a club active between the 1930s and 1960s. Renamed as Britannia in 1963, merged with Spearwood Rovers in 1964 to form Cockburn United, now Cockburn City SC.
