= 2022 Football West State Cup =

Australian football tournament

2022 State Cup
Tournament details
- Teams: 58

Final positions
- Champions: Cockburn City

Western Australian soccer clubs competed in 2022 for the Football West State Cup. Perth-based clubs entered from the National Premier Leagues WA, the two divisions of the State League, a limited number of teams from various divisions of the 2022 Amateur League and 2022 Metropolitan League competitions. There were also regional teams from the South West and Great Southern regions.

This knockout competition was won by Cockburn City, their seventh title (five of the first six having been won by the predecessor club Spearwood Dalmatinac).

The competition also served as the Western Australian Preliminary rounds for the 2022 Australia Cup. The two finalists – Armadale SC and Cockburn City – qualified for the final rounds, entering at the Round of 32.

== Format ==
Round	Clubs remaining	Winners from previous round	New entries this round	Match Dates
Round 2	58	none	23 (inc. 13 byes)	25–27 Feb
Round 3	53	18	24	19 Mar–14 Apr
Round 4	32	21	11	23 Apr–4 May
Round 5	16	16	none	17–19 May
Round 6	8	8	none	7–8 Jun
Round 7	4	4	none	21–22 Jun
Final	2	2	none	24 Jul

== Preliminary rounds ==
A total of 58 teams took part in the competition, from Perth-based and regional-based competitions.

== Final ==
The 2022 Men's State Cup Final was played at the neutral venue of Inglewood Stadium. Earlier in the day, Perth RedStar won the Women's State Cup.

24 July 2022	Cockburn City	3–2	Armadale SC	Inglewood Stadium, Perth
15:30	Robinson 4' (pen.), 90+3' (pen.); O'Brien 47'	Report	Jacobsz 76'; Rivera 78' (pen.)	Referee: Josh Mannella
