= Robert Zabica =

Australian soccer player

Personal information
- Full name: Robert Zabica
- Date of birth: 9 April 1964 (age 62)
- Place of birth: Spearwood, Western Australia, Australia
- Position: Goalkeeper

Youth career
- Spearwood Dalmatinac

Senior career*
Years	Team	Apps	(Gls)
1982	Spearwood Dalmatinac		
1983–1986	Cockburn United		
1987	Stirling Macedonia		
1988–1994	Adelaide City	195	(0)
1995–1996	Spearwood Dalmatinac		
1996–1997	Perth Glory	7	(0)
1995–1997	Spearwood Dalmatinac		
1997–1998	Bradford City	3	(0)
1998	Cockburn City	4	(0)
1999	Bayswater City Panthers		
2000–2001	Inglewood United		
2001–2002	Fremantle City		
Total		209	(0)

International career
1990–1994	Australia	28	(0)
- * Club domestic league appearances and goals

Robert Zabica (born 9 April 1964 in Spearwood, Western Australia) is an Australian former goalkeeper. Zabica represented the Australian national team 28 times in 'A' international matches and also represented Western Australia.

== Playing career ==
Zabica started his career with Cockburn City before joining Adelaide City for seven seasons, winning National Soccer League (NSL) championships in 1992 and 1994. He played for Australia in the qualifiers for the 1994 FIFA World Cup finals, losing narrowly to Argentina. A nagging knee injury forced his international retirement, but he made a comeback in 1995 with Dalmatinac with whom he won the D'Orsogna Cup. He made his State debut at the age of 31, captaining the side that beat West Ham United in 1995, and went on to play a further five times for Western Australia. He returned to national league level in 1997, making seven appearances for Perth Glory and taking his career tally to 202 games. He had a three-match spell in England with Bradford City in late 1997 and returned to Perth to play for Bayswater City SC, Inglewood United and Fremantle City.

Zabica made his international debut for Australia in 1990.

== Honours ==
Adelaide City

- National Soccer League Championship: 1991–92, 1993–94
- National Cup: 1991–92

Individual

- National Soccer League Goalkeeper of the Year: 1991–92
- Football Federation Australia Hall of Fame inductee: 2006
