= 2017 Football West State Cup =

2017 State Cup
Tournament details
- Teams: 58

Final positions
- Champions: Western Knights

Western Australian soccer clubs competed in 2017 for the Football West State Cup. Clubs entered from the National Premier Leagues WA, the two divisions of the State League, a limited number of teams from various divisions of the 2017 Amateur League competition, and from regional teams from the South West, Goldfields and Great Southern regions.

This knockout competition was won by Western Knights, their third title.

The competition also served as the Western Australian Preliminary Rounds for the 2017 FFA Cup. The two finalists – Sorrento FC and Western Knights – qualified for the final rounds, entering at the Round of 32.

== Format ==
| Round | Clubs remaining | Winners from previous round | New entries this round | Main Dates |
|---|---|---|---|---|
| Round 2 | 58 | none | 10 (inc. 3 byes) | 19 Mar |
| Round 3 | 51 | 10 | 22 | 1–2 Apr |
| Round 4 | 32 | 19 | 13 | 17 Apr |
| Round 5 | 16 | 16 | none | 25 Apr |
| Round 6 | 8 | 8 | none | 20–21 May |
| Round 7 | 4 | 4 | none | 5 Jun |
| Final | 2 | 2 | none | 22 Jul |

== Preliminary rounds ==
A total of 58 teams took part in the competition, from Perth-based and regional-based competitions.

== Final ==
The 2017 State Cup Final was played on 22 July 2017, at the neutral venue of Perth Plasterboard Centre Stadium.

| 22 July 2017 | Western Knights | 1–0 | Sorrento FC | Perth Plasterboard Centre Stadium |
| 15:00 | Jelenovic 69' | Report |
