= Steve Burton (footballer, born 1983) =

English footballer

Personal information
- Full name: Steven Paul Burton
- Date of birth: 9 October 1981 (age 45)
- Place of birth: Doncaster, England
- Position: Striker

Team information
- Current team: Bayswater City

Senior career*
Years	Team	Apps	(Gls)
2002–2003	Ipswich Town	0	(0)
2002	→ Boston United (loan)	8	(0)
2003–2004	→ Doncaster Rovers (loan)	7	(1)
2004–2005	Scarborough	15	(4)
2004–2005	→ Leigh RMI (loan)	2	(0)
2005	Canvey Island	8	(1)
2005–2006	Crawley Town	41	(9)
2006–2007	Tamworth	26	(3)
2007	Kettering Town		
2007–2008	Harrogate Town	17	(2)
2008–2010	Guiseley AFC	0	(0)
2010–2011	Bradford Park Avenue	15	(4)
2011–2012	Balcatta		
2012	South Melbourne	10	(3)
2013–2015	Bayswater City		
2015	Floreat Athena	17	(5)
2016	Bayswater City	7	(0)
2017	Olympic Kingsway		
2018	Inglewood United		
- * Club domestic league appearances and goals as of 26 February 2018

Steven Paul Burton (born 9 October 1983) is an English footballer.

Burtons former teams include Boston United, Doncaster Rovers, Scarborough, Crawley Town and Harrogate Town.

On 28 June 2007, local newspaper Tamworth Herald confirmed that Tamworth manager Gary Mills had said that Burton hadn't been offered a new deal at the club and was unlikely to receive one along with fellow striker Jon Stevenson.

It was confirmed on 2 July 2007 that Burton had teamed up with his former manager Mark Cooper, who he played under at Tamworth, by signing a one-year deal with Kettering Town.

He has however been allowed to leave the club and was given a trial with Cambridge United.

On 11 December 2007, Burton left Kettering Town to join Harrogate Town. Steve made his Harrogate Town debut on 22 December 2008 against Worcester City however Harrogate Town lost 1–0. Steve scored his first goal for Harrogate Town in the 2–2 draw against Hyde United on 29 December 2007 in the last minute of the game. Throughout the remainder of the season Steve suffered from an abdominal injury that limited his starting chances. At the end of the season, Steve found himself on the released list at Harrogate Town and joined Guiseley AFC. In September 2010 he signed for Bradford Park Avenue.

In February 2011 Burton signed for Football West Premier League side Balcatta SC – he made his debut for the club on 20 March scoring a hat-trick in their 5–1 win at Bayswater City.

In July 2012 he joined South Melbourne FC.

In January 2013 he joined Football West Premier League side Bayswater City Soccer Club.
