= Football West State Cup =

Football competition in Western Australia

- Organiser(s): Football West
- Founded: 1899; 127 years ago
- Region: Western Australia
- Teams: 69 (in 2024)
- Qualifier for: Australia Cup
- Current champions: Fremantle City (9th title) (2026)
- Most championships: Perth SC (Azzurri, Italia) (13 titles)
- Website: FootballWest.com.au
- 2026 Australia Cup preliminary rounds

The Football West State Cup is a soccer competition held between clubs in the Australian state of Western Australia, known as the Belt Up Cup for sponsorship reasons. It serves as preliminary rounds for the Australia Cup, previously known as the FFA Cup, with the 2 finalists also entering the final stages of that competition.

== History ==
Several knockout competitions have been held since 1895 in various forms, with one of the two major Western Australian knockout cup competitions initially called the Challenge Cup, from 1903 to 1959 as the Challenge Cup and Shield, between 1960 and 1995 as the D’Orsogna Cup, and since that time with a number of naming rights sponsors.

The other major knockout competition in Western Australia was the Charity Cup, held between 1903 and 1961. This was considered the pre-eminent cup competition prior to the Second World War.

Since 2014, this knockout competition has also served as preliminary rounds for the Australia Cup, previously known as the FFA Cup, with Western Australia represented by the 2 finalists, along with the A-League club Perth Glory FC.

== Current Cup Competitions (since 2014) ==
The current format is also a qualifying completion for the Australia Cup, previously known as the FFA Cup, where both the finalists qualify for the Round of 32.

Competition and year	Winner	Australia Cup (FFA Cup) qualification	Qualifiers
Cool Ridge Cup 2014	Bayswater City	2014 FFA Cup preliminary rounds	Bayswater City; Stirling Lions
Cool Ridge Cup 2015	Sorrento FC	2015 FFA Cup preliminary rounds	Perth SC; Sorrento FC
Cool Ridge Cup 2016	Floreat Athena	2016 FFA Cup preliminary rounds	Cockburn City; Floreat Athena
State Cup 2017	Western Knights	2017 FFA Cup preliminary rounds	Sorrento FC; Western Knights
Belt Up Cup 2018	Armadale	2018 FFA Cup preliminary rounds	Armadale; Gwelup Croatia
Belt Up Cup 2019	Floreat Athena	2019 FFA Cup preliminary rounds	Bayswater City; Floreat Athena
State Cup 2020	Competition cancelled due to the COVID-19 pandemic in Australia		
Belt Up State Cup 2021	Floreat Athena	2021 FFA Cup preliminary rounds	ECU Joondalup; Floreat Athena
2022 Football West State Cup	Cockburn City	2022 Australia Cup preliminary rounds	Armadale; Cockburn City
2023 Football West State Cup	Floreat Athena	2023 Australia Cup preliminary rounds	Floreat Athena; Inglewood United
2024 Football West State Cup	Olympic Kingsway	2024 Australia Cup preliminary rounds	Olympic Kingsway; Perth RedStar
2025 Football West State Cup	Stirling Macedonia	2025 Australia Cup preliminary rounds	Stirling Macedonia; Olympic Kingsway
2026 Football West State Cup	Fremantle City	2026 Australia Cup preliminary rounds	Bayswater City; Fremantle City

== Recent Cup Competitions 1996–2013 ==
Competition and Year	Winner
Soccer West Coast Cup 1996	Stirling Macedonia
Soccer West Coast Cup 1997	Floreat Athena
Boral Challenge Cup 1998	Joondalup City
Boral Challenge Cup 1999	Inglewood Falcons
Boral Challenge Cup 2000	Western Knights
Boral Challenge Cup 2001	Perth
Boral Challenge Cup 2002	ECU Joondalup
Boral Challenge Cup 2003	Swan IC
Boral Challenge Cup 2004	Swan IC

Competition and Year	Winner
Midland Brick Semi-Pro Cup 2005	Perth
Soccer Pools State Cup 2006	Stirling Lions
State Cup 2007	Stirling Lions
Soccer Pools State Cup 2008	Western Knights
Soccer Pools State Cup 2009	Floreat Athena
State League Cup 2010	Stirling Lions
State League Cup 2011	Sorrento
State League Cup 2012	Sorrento
Cool Ridge Cup 2013	Bayswater City

== D’Orsogna Cup 1960–1995 ==
Competition and Year	Winner
D’Orsogna Cup 1960	Azzurri
D’Orsogna Cup 1961	East Fremantle Tricolore
D’Orsogna Cup 1962	East Fremantle Tricolore
D’Orsogna Cup 1963	North Perth SC
D’Orsogna Cup 1964	North Perth SC
D’Orsogna Cup 1965	Azzurri
D’Orsogna Cup 1966	East Fremantle Tricolore
D’Orsogna Cup 1967	Perth Cracovia
D’Orsogna Cup 1968	East Fremantle Tricolore
D’Orsogna Cup 1969	Azzurri
D’Orsogna Cup 1970	Azzurri
D’Orsogna Cup 1971	Azzurri
D’Orsogna Cup 1972	East Fremantle Tricolore
D’Orsogna Cup 1973	Azzurri
D’Orsogna Cup 1974	Morley Windmills
D’Orsogna Cup 1975	Morley Windmills
D’Orsogna Cup 1976	East Fremantle Tricolore
D’Orsogna Cup 1977	Inglewood Kiev

Competition and Year	Winner
D’Orsogna Cup 1978	East Fremantle Tricolore
D’Orsogna Cup 1979	East Fremantle Tricolore
D’Orsogna Cup 1980	West Perth Macedonia
D’Orsogna Cup 1981	Azzurri
D’Orsogna Cup 1982	Gosnells City
D’Orsogna Cup 1983	Spearwood Dalmatinac
D’Orsogna Cup 1984	Spearwood Dalmatinac
D’Orsogna Cup 1985	Spearwood Dalmatinac
D’Orsogna Cup 1986	Kelmscott
D’Orsogna Cup 1987	Floreat Athena
D’Orsogna Cup 1988	Floreat Athena
D’Orsogna Cup 1989	Floreat Athena
D’Orsogna Cup 1990	Perth Italia
D’Orsogna Cup 1991	Queens Park
D’Orsogna Cup 1992	Stirling Macedonia
D’Orsogna Cup 1993	Perth Italia
D’Orsogna Cup 1994	Spearwood Dalmatinac
D’Orsogna Cup 1995	Spearwood Dalmatinac

== Challenge Cup and Shield 1899–1959 ==
Competition and Year	Winner
Challenge Cup 1899	Fremantle Wanderers (Note: In 1898 the Challenge Cup – originally known as the Wilson Cup – was awarded to the league champions, Civil Service.)
Challenge Cup 1900	Civil Service
Challenge Cup 1901	Fremantle Wanderers
Challenge Cup 1902	Civil Service
Challenge Cup and Shield 1903	Civil Service
Challenge Cup and Shield 1904	Perth FC
Challenge Cup and Shield 1905	Corinthian
Challenge Cup and Shield 1906	Rangers
Challenge Cup and Shield 1907	Fremantle Rovers (Note: round-robin format.)
Challenge Cup and Shield 1908	Rangers
Challenge Cup and Shield 1909	City United
Challenge Cup and Shield 1910	Claremont
Challenge Cup and Shield 1911	Fremantle
Challenge Cup and Shield 1912	Claremont
Challenge Cup and Shield 1913	Claremont
Challenge Cup and Shield 1914	Thistle
Challenge Cup and Shield 1915	Claremont
1916	No competition due to World War I
Challenge Cup and Shield 1917	Perth City (Note: reduced war-time competition.)
Challenge Cup and Shield 1918	Perth City
Challenge Cup and Shield 1919	Thistle
Challenge Cup and Shield 1920	Claremont
Challenge Cup and Shield 1921	Northern Casuals
Challenge Cup and Shield 1922	Thistle
Challenge Cup and Shield 1923	Claremont
Challenge Cup and Shield 1924	Northern Casuals
Challenge Cup and Shield 1925	Northern Casuals
Challenge Cup and Shield 1926	Northern Casuals
Challenge Cup and Shield 1927	Caledonian
Challenge Cup and Shield 1928	Northern Casuals

Competition and Year	Winner
Challenge Cup and Shield 1929	Victoria Park
Challenge Cup and Shield 1930	Thistle
Challenge Cup and Shield 1931	Victoria Park
Challenge Cup and Shield 1932	Northern Casuals
Challenge Cup and Shield 1933	Victoria Park
Challenge Cup and Shield 1934	Victoria Park
Challenge Cup and Shield 1935	Caledonian
Challenge Cup and Shield 1936	jointly Caledonian and Victoria Park
Challenge Cup and Shield 1937	jointly Caledonian and Victoria Park
Challenge Cup and Shield 1938	Victoria Park
Challenge Cup and Shield 1939	Caledonian
Challenge Cup and Shield 1940	Victoria Park
Challenge Cup and Shield 1941	Spearwood Rovers
1942–1944	No competition due to World War II
Challenge Cup and Shield 1945	Queens Park
1946	Not held
Challenge Cup and Shield 1947	North Perth
Challenge Cup and Shield 1948	South Perth
Challenge Cup and Shield 1949	Caledonian
Challenge Cup and Shield 1950	Perth City
Challenge Cup and Shield 1951	South Perth
Challenge Cup and Shield 1952	North Perth
Challenge Cup and Shield 1953	Azzurri
Challenge Cup and Shield 1954	Swan Athletic
Challenge Cup and Shield 1955	Perth City
Challenge Cup and Shield 1956	Swan Valley
Challenge Cup and Shield 1957	Perth City
Challenge Cup and Shield 1958	Azzurri
Challenge Cup and Shield 1959	Windmills

== Charity Cup 1903–1961 ==
Competition and Year	Winner
Charity Cup 1903	Olympic
Charity Cup 1904	Perth FC
Charity Cup 1905	Civil Service
Charity Cup 1906	Fremantle Rovers
Charity Cup 1907	Rangers
Charity Cup 1908	City United
Charity Cup 1909	Claremont
Charity Cup 1910	Claremont#1 (Note: won on replay, after original match was drawn.)
Charity Cup 1911	City United
Charity Cup 1912	Fremantle
Charity Cup 1913	Thistle
Charity Cup 1914	Northern Casuals
Charity Cup 1915	Thistle
1916–1918	No competition due to World War I
Charity Cup 1919	Perth City United
Charity Cup 1920	Thistle
Charity Cup 1921	Claremont
Charity Cup 1922	Thistle
Charity Cup 1923	Claremont
Charity Cup 1924	Northern Casuals
Charity Cup 1925	Claremont
Charity Cup 1926	Victoria Park
Charity Cup 1927	Caledonian
Charity Cup 1928	Victoria Park

Competition and Year	Winner
Charity Cup 1929	Thistle
Charity Cup 1930	Northern Casuals
Charity Cup 1931	Victoria Park
Charity Cup 1932	Victoria Park
Charity Cup 1933	Victoria Park (Note: won on second replay, after both original match and first replay were drawn.)
Charity Cup 1934	Victoria Park
Charity Cup 1935	Victoria Park
Charity Cup 1936	Caledonian
1937	Not Held
Charity Cup 1938	Caledonian
Charity Cup 1939	Caledonian
Charity Cup 1940	Caledonian
Charity Cup 1941	Caledonian
1942–1945	No competition due to World War II
Charity Cup 1946	Swan Valley
Charity Cup 1947	North Perth
Charity Cup 1948	North Perth
Charity Cup 1949	Caledonian
Charity Cup 1950	Spearwood Rovers
Charity Cup 1951	Perth City
Charity Cup 1952	Azzurri
Charity Cup 1953	Azzurri
1954–1960	Not Held
Charity Cup 1961	Swan Valley
