= Bassendean Caledonians SFC =

Football club in Perth, Western Australia

Bassendean Caledonians
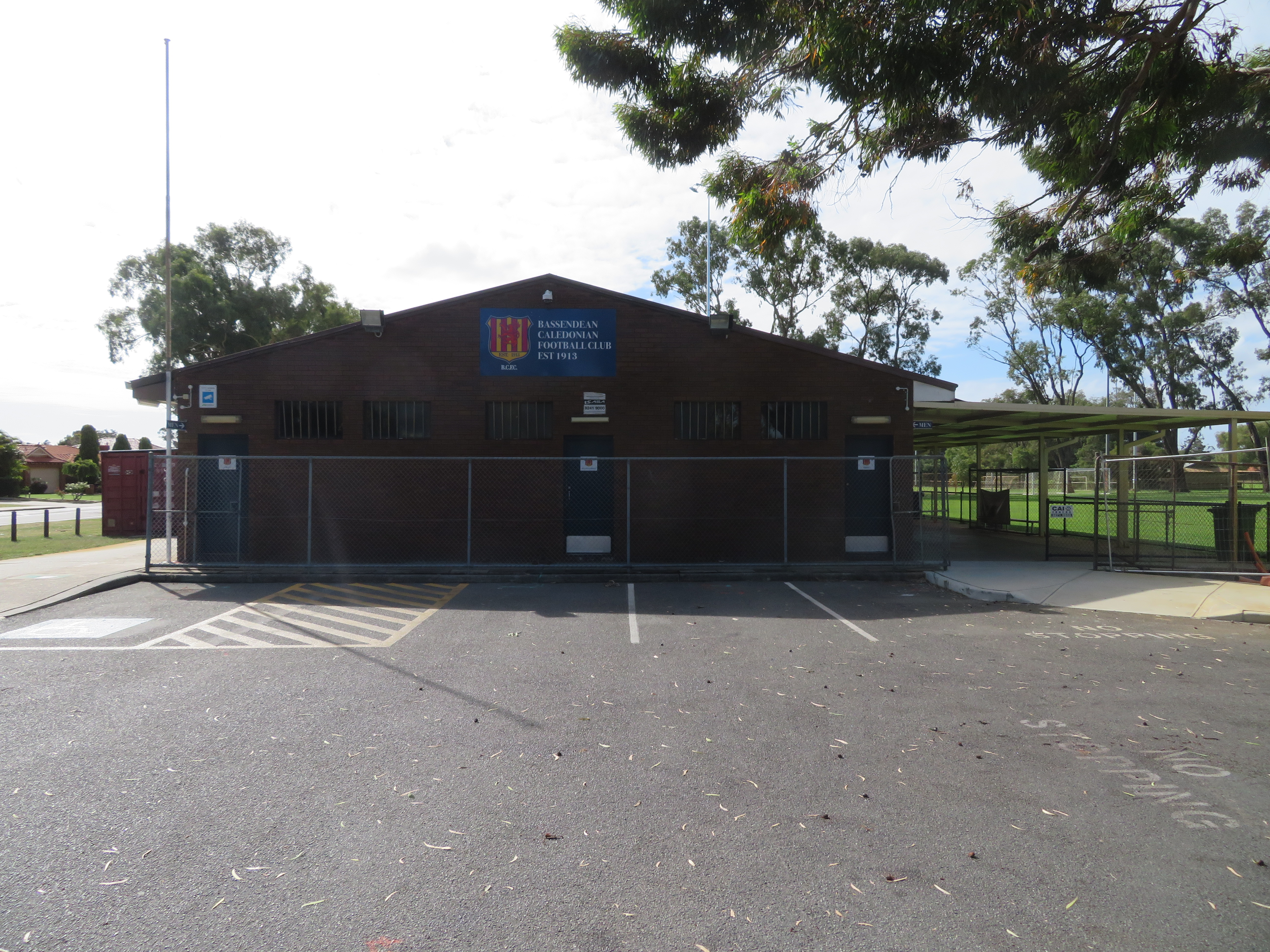
- The Bassendean Caledonians' club headquarters at Jubilee Reserve in Eden Hill
- Full name: Bassendean Caledonian Soccer Football Club
- Nicknames: Caledonians, Callies
- Founded: 1913
- Ground: Jubilee Reserve
- Coordinates: 31.891055°S 115.937864°E
- League: Men: Football West Amateur League; Women: Women State League Division 1
- Website: https://calliesfc.com.au/

Bassendean Caledonian Soccer Football Club is an association football team based in Bassendean, Western Australia.

== History ==
The club was founded on 11 February 1913 as the Caledonian Soccer Club by members of the Fremantle Caledonian Society. The club played games at Fremantle.

=== World War I ===
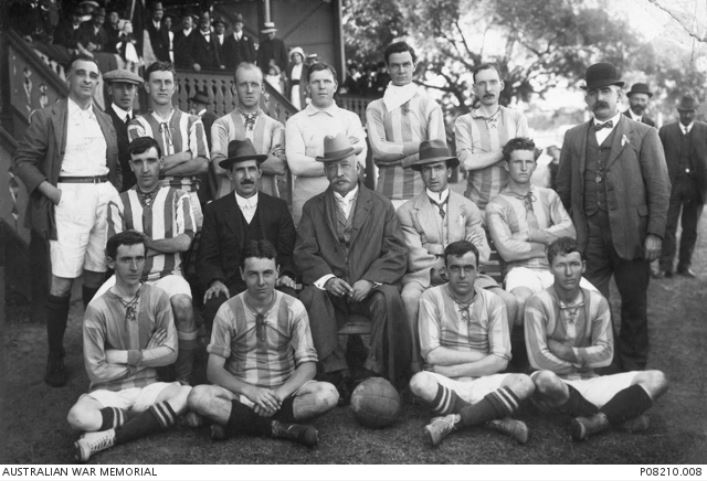
A Scottish team made up of members of the Caledonian Soccer Club. Fremantle 1914.

The tragedy of the First World War interrupted the formative years of the club. The team was forced to relocate to the ‘Polo’ (Trotting) grounds at East Fremantle in 1915, with Fremantle Park being used as a camp for the First Australian Imperial Force. The council had refused their application to use East Fremantle Oval.

Eventually most of the Caledonian soccer team's players and officials enlisted in the Australian Forces in the 1914–18 War. They were J. Anderson, J. Cowan A. Marr F. Beisley R. Dewar J. McFarlane C. Braidwood J. Durward D. McKinnon A. Brown W. Earnshaw R. McKinnon G. Brown J. Gourley A. McPherson D. Cameron C. Grieve C. Monteath J. Chalmers D. Henry D.Reid W. Chalmers R. Leonard J. Simpson A. Cowan F. Lyon J. Thompson

In addition, the West Australian of 14 May 1915 mentions a Callies player, Wilkie, as ‘being in Khaki’, and later references were made by Alec Marr to ‘wee McGregor’ serving at the front. Another Caledonian official, J. H. Campbell may be John Hollis Campbell who embarked with the 11th Battalion on 15 June 1917, while Archibald Cameron of High Street, Fremantle who served with the 27th Battalion may be the A. Cameron who was one of Callies’ original players.

Amongst all these players and officials a group of 14 were guests of the Fremantle Caledonian Society at a farewell function in the Caledonian Hall at the end of the 1915 season.

When the Society organised a welcome home function for the Caledonian recruits four years later only five of the 14 attended, the rest having been killed, wounded or otherwise traumatised by the conflict.

The extent of the Caledonian sacrifice to the Australian War effort can be seen in that all but five of the regular first team players in this squad made the supreme sacrifice while serving in the First World War.

The Caledonian players killed in action were ‘Barney’ Cowan, ‘Barney’ Henry, ‘Dickie’ Leonard, Dave McKinnon, Jamie Simpson, Frank Lyon, William Chalmers MM and Charlie Monteath.

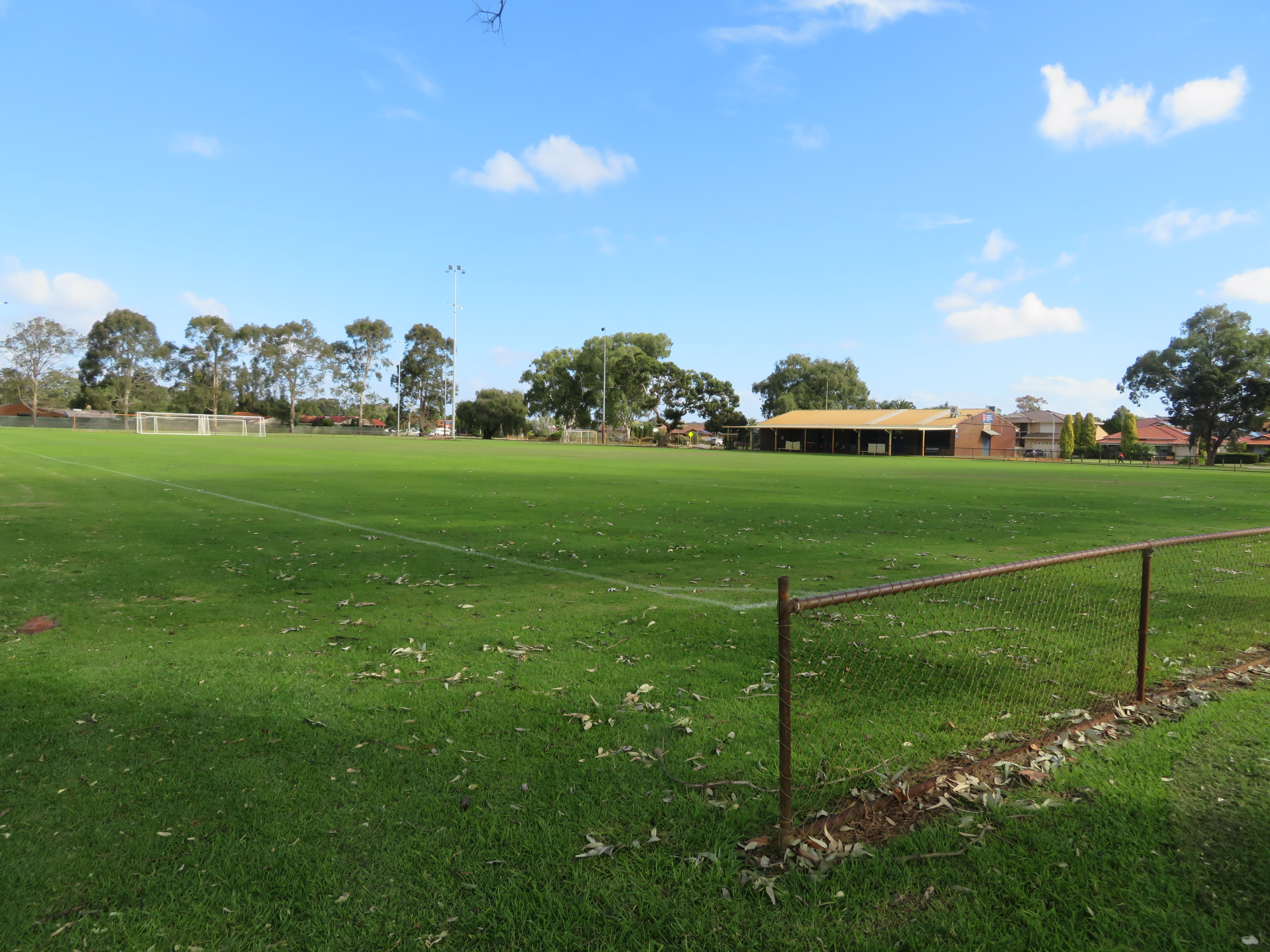
The Bassendean Caledonians' home grounds at Jubilee Reserve in Eden Hill

On the first of August 1919, the Fremantle Herald reported that the Caledonian Society held a minute silence in remembrance of their fallen comrades in the soccer team. The same newspaper later recorded that at its 11th Annual General Meeting on 4 June 1920 the Society had erected a large plaque inscribed with the names of the 106 members who had served in the Anzac forces. This plaque, together with all the records of this once flourishing Society has now been lost.

=== Reformation ===
The club became inactive at the outset of World War I and was reformed in 1920.

In 1925 the club moved to Mosman Park, playing at Mann Oval. In 1927 the team won every match it played in every competition.

After a series of disagreements with the local council the club played its last season in Mosman Park in 1961. The following year the club moved to the Perth Esplanade. Caledonians continued at the Esplanade until moving to Woodville Reserve in North Perth for the 1968 season. In 1969 the club moved again, this time to the Lake Monger Velodrome where they played until the end of the 1971 season. In 1972 Caledonians moved to Jubilee Reserve in Eden Hill, their current home.

The men's team is currently represented in the Football West Amateur League.

== Men's team ==
=== Honours ===
- Premier – 1926, 1927, 1933, 1941, 1946, 1947, 1949
- Charity Cup – 1927, 1936, 1938, 1939, 1940, 1941, 1949
- Challenge Cup – 1927, 1935, 1936, 1937, 1939, 1949
- Association Cup – 1935, 1936, 1938, 1940
- First Division Champions – 2000
- First Division Top 4 Cup Winners - 2000

== Women's team ==
The Caledonians women's team plays in the Women State League Division 1 competition, finishing 10th out of 11 in the 2019 season.
