= Forrestfield United SC =

Football club in Perth, Western Australia

- Full name: Forrestfield United Football Club W.A.
- Nickname: Forrie
- Founded: 1962
- Ground: Crazy Domains Stadium, Hartfield Park, Forrestfield
- Capacity: 3,500
- President: Paul Mansfield
- Senior Coach: Richie Abrams
- Coach: Malcom Tshuma, Conor Rae & Steven Parry
- League: State League 2
- 2025: 4th of 12
- Website: forrestfieldunited.club
Home colours

Forrestfield United Soccer Club is a football club in Perth, Western Australia. The club was founded in 1962 as Cottesloe Soccer Club. It is a regional community club in the City of Kalamunda situated at Hartfield Park in the foothills of the Darling Ranges, with over 600 players. The club offers a development pathway with Football Federation Australia accredited coaches via its Junior NPL program all the way through to its semi-professional senior team.

== History ==
The club was originally known as Cottesloe SC when it was first admitted into the State League competition in 1962.

Cottesloe SC then merged with the Swan Migrant Association (SMA) in 1971 to become SMA Cottesloe SC. As SMA were based in the Ascot area, the club's name was changed to Ascot Soccer Club the following year.

Ascot were WA Champions in 1974, taking out the State Premier Division title by nine points.

1978 was a pivotal year for the club. They won the last Ampol Cup competition, the trophy for which is still on display in the team's Club House. Merger discussions occurred at the end of the season with then fourth division club, Kalamunda United SC, who were based at Hartfield Park, Forrestfield. The merger went ahead, and the combined team entered the State Competition in 1979 as Forrestfield United SC.

The Senior team competed in the Amateur League from 1993 to 2004.

In 2017 the club embarked on a $1.5 million improvement, which saw a state of the art 500 seat boutique stadium built, a pitch perimeter fence installed, full refurbishment of the changing room facilities and the floodlighting upgraded to Football West requirements. All this with the help of the Shire of Kalamunda, State and Federal Government.

=== Promotion path to the NPL (2015–2018) ===
The senior team competed in the NPL in the 2018 season.

In 2015 they finished 1st in WA State League Division 2 and secured promotion to WA State League Division 1.

In 2016 in their first season returning to WA State League Division 1 they finished 3rd.

In 2017 they finished 2nd in WA State League Division 1 and secured promotion to the NPL via a 2 leg play-off against Mandurah City 6–3.

In 2018 they finished 13th in the NPL and were relegated back to WA State League Division 1.

== Honours ==
- State League Premiers – 1974 (as Ascot)
- Top Four/Five Cup Winners – 1981
- First Division Winners – 1984
- State Division 2 Winners – 2015

== Current squad ==
As of May 2022

Note: Flags indicate national team as defined under FIFA eligibility rules; some limited exceptions apply. Players may hold more than one non-FIFA nationality.

No.	Pos.	Nation	Player
1	GK	AUS	Jordan Howell
2	DF	AUS	Mitchell Norman
3	DF	AUS	Maxwell Snelson
4	DF	AUS	Jiddan Muhafidin
5	MF	AUS	Shaydon Passalacqua
6	DF	AUS	Anthony McCardle
7	MF	AUS	Matt Evans
8	MF	AUS	Alex Baker
9	FW	AUS	Cooper Holland
10	MF	AUS	Austin Reynolds
11	MF	AUS	Noah Appleby
12	DF	AUS	Eddie Garrido
14	MF	AUS	Darsi Mukunzi
15	MF	AUS	Kyan Mamudoski
16	DF	AUS	Rylan Walker
17	DF	AUS	Callum Shepherd
19	FW	AUS	Sherwin Tucker
21	DF	AUS	Will Harrison
22	MF	AUS	Josh Gardner
23	MF	AUS	Rhys Loxely

== Staff ==
- President: Paul Mansfield
- First-team coach: Daryl Platten
- Assistant coach: Paul Oliver
