= Stirling Macedonia FC =

Soccer club in Perth, Western Australia

Stirling Macedonia
- Full name: Stirling Macedonia Football Club
- Nicknames: Macies, Macedonians
- Founded: 1958; 68 years ago
- Ground: Macedonia Park
- Capacity: 7,000
- Chairman: Luke Pavlos
- Manager: Dean Nicolaou (caretaker)
- League: NPL Western Australia
- 2025: 5th of 12
- Website: www.stirlinglions.com.au
| Home colours | Away colours |

Stirling Macedonia Football Club (formerly West Perth Macedonia and Stirling Lions) is an Australian soccer club based in Perth, Western Australia, who are competing in the National Premier Leagues Western Australia.

== History ==
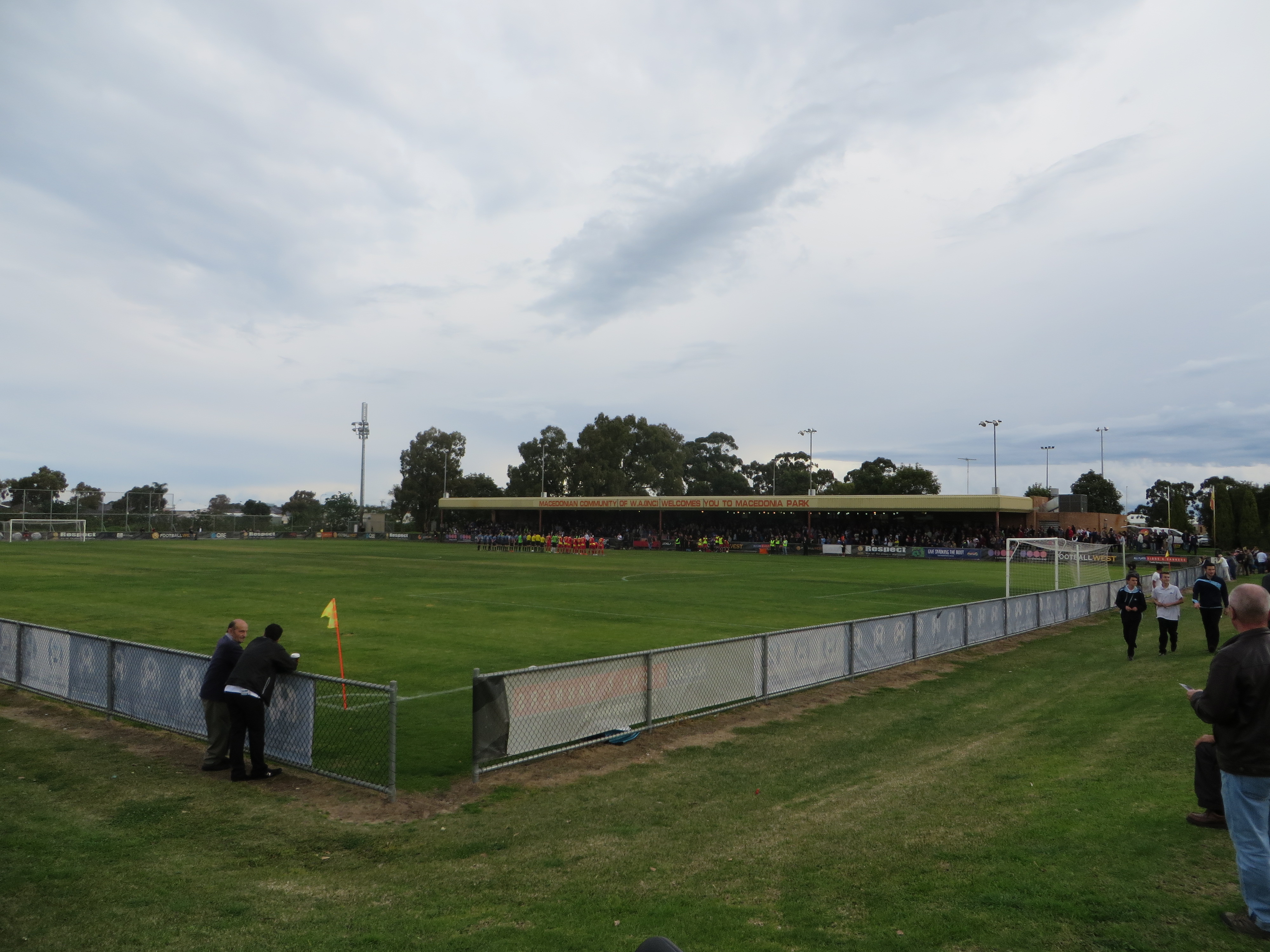
Macedonia Park

=== Early history ===
Stirling Macedonia has evolved with the history of the Macedonian Australian community of Western Australia. The club has been through a number of name changes and directions in its history. Initially formed as East Perth Macedonia in 1958, the club dissolved in 1967, but in 1969 the Macedonian community put together the necessary funds to revive the club. In 1970, the club was revived as West Perth Macedonia. The club endured highs and lows in the 1970s and early 1980s, with its biggest success coming when they won the League Title in its third year of being in the State League.

=== Major success in the 1980s and 1990s ===
In 1986, the club changed its name to Stirling Macedonia with a move to Macedonia Park. That year, the Club represented the Soccer Federation of Western Australia against Adelaide City in the NANDA Cup in front of a crowd of approximately 5,000 people. During the 1980s and 1990s, Stirling became one of the most powerful clubs in Western Australia, winning six league premierships. Stirling completed a three-peat from 1983 to 1985, and also captured the league title in 1987, 1994 and 1995. Further successes in a variety of other competitions meant that the club completed three doubles and three trebles, including an unprecedented run of three trebles in a row from 1994 to 1996, capturing a treble of the league, Top 4 Cup and Night Series in 1994 and 1995 and completing a treble of the Top 4 Cup, the Night Series and the State Cup in 1996.

In 1999, the club changed their name to the Stirling Lions Soccer Club as a result of the National Club Identity Policy, which forced references to ethnicities to be removed from club names.

=== Diminished success in the 2000s and 2010s, downturns and rebuilds ===
After the prolonged success of Stirling throughout the 80s and 90s, their fortunes took a turn for the worse during the 2000s. Despite not finishing in the relegation spots, the Lions were relegated from the top flight for the first time in 20 years at the conclusion of the 1999 season due to off-field disputes, and remained there until winning promotion back in the 2002 season. The main bright spot of the 2000s was the 2006 season, where Stirling won the State Cup and finished as runners-up in the league. Overall the 2000s would only see two State Cups, coming in 2006 and 2007, a meager trophy haul compared to the massive ones of the 80s and 90s, and of course the unfortunate years away from the top flight that the club had grown accustomed to.

However, the beginning of the 2010s saw the fortunes of the club begin to turn. 2010 saw the club capture the State Cup and finish as runners ups in the league. In 2013, Stirling finally returned to the top of Western Australian football as they won their first league title since 1995, and finished as runners up in the Top 5 Cup. In October 2014, Cane Spaseski was appointed as club president, and with Cane at the helm, the club quickly grew to become a club of choice. Under the tutelage of Technical Director Richard Changadzo with an elite group of coaching staff, in 2016 the club's junior NPL teams flourished and finished top 5 overall in 2016/17. Richard departed from the club after 2018, and Cane also stepped down.

Stirling were relegated in the 2019 season, and their bid for immediate promotion in the 2020 season was halted by the COVID-19 pandemic which saw relegation and promotion suspended.

=== 2019-2023: Becoming Stirling Macedonia again, 2021 State League One Champions, 2023 NPL Champions ===
In 2019, the National Club Identity Policy that had forced the club to change its name to Stirling Lions was revoked, and the club announced a return to the original name of Stirling Macedonia for the 2021 season.

Stirling would charge to promotion in 2021, dominating the State League 1 and returning to the top flight. In their first season back in the top flight, Stirling challenged for the league title up until the last day of the season, but were defeated by Sorrento FC on the final matchday of the season, allowing Floreat Athena to win the league and Perth RedStar to finish as runners-up. Stirling would exit the Top 4 Cup in the first week, but the signs were there- they were ready to make an impact next season.

Stirling would then go on to compound their strong 2022 league performance in the 2023 season, finishing as runners-up in the league to Perth RedStar and moving on to the Top 4 Cup with a double chance as a result of their Top 2 finish.

After losing 1–0 to RedStar in the first week of finals, Stirling's Top 2 finish gave them a second chance against Perth SC in the second week of finals. After a 0–0 finish, Stirling defeated Perth 4–3 on penalties, and moved onto the Grand Final to take on RedStar once more.

The Grand Final loomed large for the Macies- they hadn't captured the title for almost 30 years, last winning in 1996, and the heartbreaking loss in the 2013 final was on the minds of many Stirling supporters. However, Stirling would prevail, gaining their revenge on RedStar and winning 2–0 to finally return to the top of Perth football for the first time since 1996, with Aleksandar Tanevski and Calvin "Chisto Makedonche" Whitney writing themselves into the Stirling history books with their goals.

==== Stirling’s path to victory in 2023 ====
Semi-finals
1 | Perth RedStar | 1
2 | Stirling Macedonia | 0
3 | Olympic Kingsway | 0
4 | Perth SC | 3

Preliminary Final
Stirling Macedonia | 0 (4)
Perth SC | 0 (3)

Grand Final
Perth RedStar | 0
Stirling Macedonia | 2

=== 2024-present: Sustained success at the top level, State Cup champions ===
Stirling's 2024 season would see them once again qualify for the Top 4 Cup after finishing 4th in the league, giving them the chance to defend their 2023 Top 4 Cup. They kicked off their finals campaign against 3rd-placed Fremantle City FC in a Semi-Final, defeating them 3-2 and progressing to a Preliminary Final against Perth RedStar FC in a rematch of the 2023 Grand Final. Stirling would defeat RedStar 3–0, moving on to the Grand Final for the second consecutive season, where they played arch-rivals Olympic Kingsway SC in a bid to defend their 2023 title and capture a second successive Championship.

Stirling fell short of the 2024 Top 4 Cup in heartbreaking fashion. The Macies would score first from the penalty spot via Tanevski to lead 1–0, but an unbelievable Olympic equaliser from outside the box deep into stoppage time pushed the match to extra time. Stirling would regain the lead late in the first half of stoppage time courtesy of Byrne, and with ten minutes left to play, a second successive Top 4 Cup seemed all but certain. However, a late charge from Olympic saw Stirling concede twice in the final ten minutes to lose 3–2, ultimately finishing as runners-up.

Stirling would start the 2025 season in fast fashion, charging through to the Night Series final after a run that included a dominant 3-1 semi-final revenge victory over Olympic Kingsway. However, Stirling would fall short of the title, losing 1–0 to Sorrento FC in the final.

On June 17, Stirling defeated Inglewood United FC to advance to the Football West State Cup Final, where they would face Olympic Kingsway SC. Their victory over Inglewood also ensured their qualification for the Australia Cup Round of 32. On August 30, Stirling defeated Olympic to claim their seventh State Cup title and their first trophy since the 2023 Top 4 Cup.

== Rivalries ==
=== Floreat Athena ===
Stirling have an intense rivalry with Greek club Floreat Athena FC. The rivalry stems from the Macedonia naming dispute, but also from the fact that the two clubs are some of Perth's largest and most successful and have often contested each other for silverware. In 2015, the Stirling captain at the time, Miki Vujacic, described the rivalry in depth:

It's the most important game of the year, every year, for the supporters and everyone involved in both clubs. League positions mean nothing. Having played for both clubs, the message before each Stirling versus Floreat game was always that it's a 'must win', almost as if every other game was a 'warm-up' to the derby. Winning against your old rivals is something special, supporters you didn't know existed come out of the woodwork and buy you a beer after the game, and I swear it tastes so much better after beating them.

In the same interview, Floreat's skipper at the time, Ludovic Boi, also commented on the rivalry, saying that:

Whether playing for Stirling or Floreat, this game will be tough no matter which side you are on. The history goes way back before I even started playing and you can see what it means when winning these games to the fans and the players.

=== Olympic Kingsway ===
Olympic Kingsway SC are another one of Stirling's other biggest rivals. Also a Greek club like Floreat, this rivalry also stems primarily from the naming dispute. Kingsway's foundation by Greek Macedonians, as opposed to Floreat's more southern Greek heritage, adds a more focused historical intensity to the rivalry.

Kingsway were relegated from the top flight in 1999 and did not obtain promotion back up until 2022. Their long period of time away from the top flight had allowed the rivalry to simmer down, with occasional clashes only occurring in cup competitions and during Stirling's brief period in the WA State League in 2002, 2020 and 2021. However, after an extensive club rebuild, Kingsway finally won promotion back to the NPL for the 2023 season, meaning the two rivals finally compete against each other once again, reinvigorating the rivalry.

=== Balcatta Etna ===
Stirling Macedonia contest the City of Stirling Derby with Italian-rooted club Balcatta Etna FC. Balcatta's home ground, Grindleford Reserve, is located in very close proximity to Macedonia Park, being less than a kilometre away and even being visible in parts from Macedonia Park. However, unlike the rivalries with Olympic Kingsway and Floreat Athena, the City of Stirling Derby is far less intense and is a result of geographical proximity rather than historical rivalry and tensions.

== Honours ==
State League Premierships
Winners: 7 (1983, 1984, 1985, 1987, 1995, 2013)
Runners Up: 7 (1986, 1990, 1992, 1996, 2006, 2010, 2023)

Top Four/Five Cup
Winners: 7 (1983, 1986, 1992, 1994, 1995, 1996, 2023)
Runners Up: 4 (1984, 1988, 2013, 2024)

State Cup
Winners: 7 (1980, 1992, 1996, 2006, 2007, 2010, 2025)
Runners Up: 5 (1987, 1993, 1994, 1997, 2014)

League Night Series
Winners: 6 (1986, 1988, 1991, 1994, 1995, 1996)
Runners Up: 2 (2016, 2025)

First Division
Winners: 3 (1979, 2002, 2021)

Doubles:
League & Top 4/5 Cup: 1 (1983)
Top 4/5 Cup & Night Series: 1 (1986)
Top 4/5 Cup & State Cup: 1 (1992)

Trebles:
League, Top 4/5 Cup & Night Series: 2 (1994, 1995)
Top 4/5 Cup, State Cup & Night Series: 1 (1996)

== Current squad ==
As of 27 June 2025

Note: Flags indicate national team as defined under FIFA eligibility rules; some limited exceptions apply. Players may hold more than one non-FIFA nationality.

| No. | Pos. | Nation | Player |
|---|---|---|---|
| 1 | GK | ENG | James Bosdet |
| 2 | | AUS | Brent Quick |
| 3 | | AUS | Joshua Bosevski |
| 4 | | AUS | Aston Montogomery |
| 5 | | AUS | Kai Matthews |
| 6 | MF | AUS | Dejan Spaseski |
| 7 | | AUS | Asher Nelson |
| 8 | | AUS | Kade Fearnall |
| 9 | | SCO | Euan Cameron |
| 10 | MF | ENG | Samuel Wynne |
| 11 | | SCO | Leigh Griffiths |
| 14 | FW | AUS | Joshua Bilaloski |

| No. | Pos. | Nation | Player |
|---|---|---|---|
| 16 | FW | AUS | Bailey Brown-Montgomery |
| 17 | | AUS | Alexander Tanevski |
| 19 | FW | AUS | Callum McKenzie |
| 22 | FW | AUS | Samuel Dweh |
| 23 | DF | AUS | Calvin Whitney |
| 25 | | AUS | Tommy Sputore |
| — | FW | AUS | Nikola Talimdzioski |
| — | | AUS | Hristijan Jankuloski |
| — | | AUS | Adrian Koios |
| — | | AUS | Aleksandar Krusaroski |

== Notable past players ==
List includes players from Stirling Macedonia youth or senior teams that have gone on to represent the Australian national team, or have amassed over 100 games with Perth Glory FC.

- (Australia) Nick Ward, who made a total of 116 appearances in the A-League for 5 different clubs, and 46 appearances for Perth Glory FC (some of which when they were competing in the NSL).
- (Australia) Hayden Doyle
- (Australia) Troy Halpin
- (Australia) Robert Zabica
- (Australia) David Micevski, who made a total of 25 appearances in the A-League for Perth Glory FC.
- (Australia) Lewis Italiano, who made a total of 49 appearances in the A-League for 3 different clubs.
