= Ashfield SC =

Football club in Perth, Western Australia

Ashfield
- Full name: Ashfield Sports Club
- Founded: 1970
- Ground: Ashfield Reserve
- Capacity: 2,000
- Coordinates: 31°54′53″S 115°56′16″E
- President: Phil Kelly
- Manager: James Sammut
- League: State League 2
- 2025: 9th of 12
- Website: https://www.ashfieldsportsclub.com.au/
Home colours

Ashfield Sports Club is an Australian semi-professional football club based in the suburb of Ashfield, Perth, Western Australia, and founded in 1970. The club will compete in 2022 in the Football West State League Division 2.

== History ==
Formed in 1970 the club was first named Ashfield Dynamo after its location in an industrial area. A dynamo is a machine that produces energy, so was a fitting name for the newly founded, "energetic" club. It competed in the Semi Professional League Division 2 in 1976. Following the Australian Soccer Federation decision to ban all ethnic names at all levels of competition, the club was renamed Ashfield Soccer and Sports Club. In 1996 a partnership with Bunbury Tricolore, saw the name changed to Ashfield-Bunbury and the club won its first title in 1998. In 2001 Bunbury Soccer Club decided to strike out on their own (as South West Phoenix FC) and the name changed back to Ashfield Soccer and Sports Club. This did not deter the club, as they won their second title in the same year. 2010 saw the name shortened to Ashfield Sports Club.

== Honours ==
- First Division Winners – 1998 (Ashfield/Bunbury), 2001 (Ashfield)
- First Division Runners Up – 2006, 2007, 2014, 2015
- Third Division Winners – 1988
- Cup Runners Up – 2013
- Night Series Lower Division Runners Up – 2007, 2010

== Season history ==
Ashfield FC League History
Season	P	W	D	L	F	A	Pos.	# Teams	Division	Coach
1976	22	3	2	17	22	17	12th	12	Third Division	John Van Hoek
1977	22	1	4	17	20	87	12th	12	Third Division	Jim Ward
1978	22	5	2	15	27	61	11th	12	Third Division	Jim Ward
1979	22	9	6	7	44	40	5th	12	Fourth Division	G. Duncan
1980	22	5	5	12	31	38	10th	12	Fourth Division	G. Duncan
1981	22	9	5	8	45	36	5th	12	Fourth Division	B. Hayburst
1982	18	4	4	10	31	56	7th	10	Fourth Division	S. Rose
1983	18	8	1	9	34	42	6th	10	Fourth Division	T. Weslowski
1984	21	1	4	16	24	45	8th	8	Fourth Division	F. Hughes
1985	24	5	5	14	28	72	8th	9	Fourth Division	J. Gray
1986	16	5	1	10	27	39	7th	9	Fourth Division	J. Gray
1987	21	6	7	8	43	36	5th	8	Fourth Division	A. McCann
1988	21	13	3	5	64	35	1st	8	Fourth Division	
1989	22	6	8	8	29	28	8th	12	Third Division	Cecil Lyness
1990	28	16	6	6	67	26	5th	15	First Division	Mike Brazil
1991	30	14	4	12	53	45	8th	16	First Division	Joe Kelly
1992	18	4	4	10	21	39	9th	14	PSF Second Division	Gerry Wardle
1993	26	13	6	7	40	30	7th	14	PSF Second Division	Jim Hendry
1994	26	11	7	8	39	38	5th	14	PSF Second Division	Fred Boulding
1995	22	4	7	11	31	60	11th	12	PSF Second Division	Fred Boulding
1996	22	11	3	8	46	42	5th	12	First Division	Jim Hendry
1997	28	17	5	6	95	46	3rd	15	First Division	Ivan Garic
1998	22	17	3	2	87	31	1st	12	First Division	Ivan Garic
1999	22	6	3	13	33	66	10th	12	Premier Division	Rob McCallum
2000	22	6	2	14	26	38	10th	12	Premier Division	Tom Kilkelly
2001	7	5	1	1	21	12	1st	8	SWC First Division – Major Playoffs	Tom Kilkelly
2002	22	1	2	19	13	66	12th	12	SWC Premier Division	Tom Kilkelly
2003	30	14	8	8	63	48	5th	16	First Division	Tom Kilkelly
2004	28	6	3	19	32	57	13th	15	First Division	Tom Kilkelly
2005	20	5	7	8	29	31	12th	15	First Division	Tom Kilkelly
2006	20	12	6	2	50	20	2nd	11	First Division	Salv Todoro
2007	22	15	3	4	54	21	2nd	12	First Division	Salv Todoro
2008	22	2	6	14	16	52	12th	12	First Division	John Castrilli
2009	22	3	1	18	17	65	11th	12	First Division	John Castrilli
2010	22	3	4	15	44	65	11th	12	First Division	John Castrilli
2011	22	9	5	8	40	44	6th	12	First Division	Matt Carruthers
2012	24	14	3	6	50	24	4th	13	First Division	Matt Carruthers
2013	22	10	4	8	48	34	6th	12	First Division	Matt Carruthers
2014	22	16	4	2	76	21	2nd	12	First Division	Paul Dundo
2015	22	16	1	5	59	24	2nd	12	First Division	Paul Dundo
2016	22	10	2	10	39	31	5th	12	First Division	Tony Maguire/Paul Dundo
2017	20	8	1	11	40	46	7th	11	First Division	Matt Wardle
2018	20	7	4	9	35	38	8th	11	First Division	Matt Wardle
2019	20	9	6	5	32	24	5th	11	First Division	Matt Wardle
