= National Premier Leagues Western Australia Men's =

- Founded: 1896
- Country: Australia
- Number of clubs: 12
- Level on pyramid: 2
- Relegation to: State League 1
- Domestic cup(s): Football West State Cup; Australia Cup
- Current champions: Bayswater City (2026)
- Current premiers: Bayswater City (2026)
- Most championships: Perth SC (Azzurri, Italia) (25 titles)
- Broadcaster(s): Streamer TV
- Website: Football West NPL
- Current: 2027 NPL Western Australia

The National Premier Leagues Western Australia (NPL WA) is a regional Australian semi-professional football league comprising teams from Western Australia. As a subdivision of the National Premier Leagues, the league is the highest level of the Western Australian league system (Level 2 of the overall Australian league system). The competition is administered by Football West, the governing body of the sport in the state. In 2014, the league – formerly known as the Football West State League Premier Division – was rebranded into what exists today.

== History ==
NPL WA traces its origin to the formation of a league by the Perth British Football Association in 1896. By the 1950s, the association was known as the Western Australian Soccer Football Association (WASFA). In, 1960 eight teams formed their own association, the Soccer Federation of Western Australia (SFWA). The WASFA and SFWA ran rival leagues between 1960 and 1962 before the SFWA prevailed. Ahead of the 1991 season, 11 SFWA clubs broke away, forming the Soccer Administration of Western Australia (SAWA). The SAWA ran the rebel Professional Soccer League (PSL) in parallel with the SFWA first division until merging before the 1993 season to form the Professional Soccer Federation of Western Australia (PSF).

Several of the clubs currently playing in the league were formed as the soccer arm of cultural associations of recently migrated Australians, with certain teams having associations with particularly nationalities e.g. Swan Italian Club (now Swan United), Bayswater Inter (now Bayswater City) and Perth Italia (now Perth SC) with Italian Australians, Morley Windmills with Dutch Australians, Floreat Athena with Greek Australians, Benfica United with Portuguese Australians, Inglewood Kiev (now Inglewood United) with Ukrainian Australians, North Perth Croatia (now Western Knights) with Croatian Australians, Spearwood Dalmatinac (now part of Cockburn City) with Yugoslav Australians, Carramar Shamrock Rovers and East Perth FC with Irish Australians, Dianella White Eagles with Serbian Australians, Stirling Macedonia with Macedonian Australians and Olympic Kingsway with Greeks Macedonians Australians. In 1994 clubs were forced by the sport's governing body to remove all references to ethnicities from their names, which resulted in several forced name changes. Some clubs reverted back to their former names after 2019, when the National Club Identity Policy was revoked. More recently, new clubs have begun to be based geographically, such as with Armadale SC and Cockburn City.

The West Australian National Training Centre included a team for the 2011–2013 seasons. They did not play for competition points, and were mostly used for development of the upcoming youth players.

== Format ==
In 2013 Football Federation of Australia introduced the new second tier competition for football in Australia, the National Premier Leagues. In 2014 Football West then reorganised the former State Premier League into the National Premier Leagues Western Australia conference and the State League (Division One and Division Two). The NPL WA competition fields a Senior first team, as well as youth teams from U12 to U20 age groups. The Perth Glory FC Youth team competes in the Senior category and has additional age restrictions.

Promotion and relegation between the NPL and the State League Division 1 became possible for the first time at the end of the 2015 season, provided the winner of the State Division 1 met Football West's promotion requirements. Two teams were promoted after the 2016 season to expand the league into a 14 team competition. After a further competition review the 2019 NPLWA season returned to a twelve-team competition. In 2020, promotion and relegation was suspended for the season, due to the impacts on the competition from the COVID-19 pandemic in Australia.

== Clubs ==
The following 12 clubs will compete in the 2027 NPL WA season.

Club	Location	Ground	Capacity
Armadale	Armadale	Alfred Skeet Oval	500
Bayswater City	Bayswater	Frank Drago Reserve	5,000
Dianella White Eagles	Dianella	Dianella Reserve	1,500
Floreat Athena	Leederville	Litis Stadium	5,000
Fremantle City	Fremantle	Hilton Park	1,000
Olympic Kingsway	Madeley	Kingsway Sporting Complex	2,500
Perth Glory Youth	Queens Park	Sam Kerr Football Centre	2,000
Perth RedStar	Joondalup	RedStar Arena	2,500
Perth Azzurri	West Perth	Dorrien Gardens	4,000
Sorrento FC	Duncraig	Percy Doyle Reserve	5,000
Stirling Macedonia	Balcatta	Macedonia Park	5,000
Western Knights	Mosman Park	Nash Field	1,000

== Honours ==
Year	Premiers	Champions	NPL finals series representation
2014	Bayswater City	Bayswater City	Bayswater City – Quarter Finalist
2015	Bayswater City (Note: undefeated league season)	–	Bayswater City – Runners up
2016	Perth SC	Perth SC	Perth SC – Semi Finalist
2017	Bayswater City	Bayswater City	Bayswater City – Quarter Finalist
2018	Perth SC	Perth SC	Perth SC – Quarter Finalist
2019	Perth SC	Perth SC	Perth SC – Semi Finalist
2020	— (Note: Premiership not awarded.)	ECU Joondalup (Note: NPL Season Champions.); Floreat Athena (Note: Top Four Cup Grand Final Champions.)	Cancelled due to the COVID-19 pandemic in Australia.
2021	Perth SC	Perth SC	Cancelled due to the COVID-19 pandemic in Australia.
2022	Floreat Athena	Perth RedStar	Not held
2023	Perth RedStar	Stirling Macedonia	Not held
2024	Olympic Kingsway	Olympic Kingsway	Not held
Year	Premiers	Champions	Australian Championship representation
2025	Bayswater City	Bayswater City	Bayswater City– Group stage
2026	Bayswater City	Bayswater City	Bayswater City– Group stage

== Honours pre-NPL (1896–2013) ==
Year	Premiers
1896	Fremantle Wanderers
1897	Fremantle Wanderers
1898	Civil Service
1899	Fremantle Wanderers
1900	Fremantle Wanderers
1901	Fremantle Wanderers
1902	Perth
1903	Fremantle
1904	Fremantle Corinthians
1905	Perth
1906	Rangers
1907	Rangers
1908	City United
1909	Training College
1910	Claremont
1911	Rangers (Note: after championship playoff)
1912	Claremont
1913	Perth City United
1914	Thistle
1915	Thistle
1916	jointly Claremont and Thistle
1917–1918	No competition due to World War 1
1919	Claremont
1920	Perth City United
1921	Thistle
1922	Perth City United
1923	Claremont
1924	Perth City
1925	Thistle
1926	Fremantle Caledonian
1927	Fremantle Caledonian
1928	Victoria Park
1929	Victoria Park
1930	Northern Casuals
1931	Victoria Park
1932	Northern Casuals
1933	Caledonian
1934	Victoria Park
1935	Victoria Park
1936	Victoria Park
1937	Victoria Park
1938	Victoria Park
1939	Victoria Park
1940	East Claremont
1941	Caledonian
1942–1944	No competition due to World War 2
1945	Jolly Rogers
1946	Caledonian
1947	Caledonian (Note: after zone playoff)
1948	North Perth
1949	Caledonian
1950	Perth City
1951	South Perth
1952	North Perth
1953	Azzurri
1954	Perth City
1955	North Perth
1956	North Perth
1957	Swan Athletic
1958	East Fremantle Tricolore
1959	Azzurri
1960	WASF : Azzurri; WASFA : North Perth-Osborne

Year	Premiers	Champions (or Top Four/Top Five Cup)
1961	WASF : Windmills; WASFA : Swan Valley	East Fremantle Tricolore
1962	WASF : Azzurri; WASFA : Perth City-Inglewood	Morley Windmills
1963	East Fremantle Tricolore	Azzurri
1964	East Fremantle Tricolore	North Perth-Osborne
1965	East Fremantle Tricolore	Swan Athletic (Note: round-robin format)
1966	Cracovia	Azzurri
1967	Azzurri	Azzurri
1968	Azzurri	Kiev
1969	Azzurri	East Fremantle Tricolore
1970	East Fremantle Tricolore	East Fremantle Tricolore
1971	Azzurri	Bayswater United
1972	East Fremantle Tricolore	Azzurri
1973	Windmills	–
1974	Ascot	Azzurri
1975	Azzurri	Floreat Athena
1976	Azzurri	Azzurri
1977	Athena	–
1978	Olympic Kingsway	Olympic Kingsway
1979	Spearwood Dalmatinac	Olympic Kingsway
1980	Olympic Kingsway	Olympic Kingsway
1981	Perth Azzurri	Forrestfield United
1982	Spearwood Dalmatinac	Spearwood Dalmatinac
1983	West Perth Macedonia	West Perth Macedonia
1984	West Perth Macedonia	Floreat Athena
1985	West Perth Macedonia	–
1986	Spearwood Dalmatinac	Stirling Macedonia
1987	Stirling Macedonia	–
1988	Floreat Athena	Floreat Athena
1989	Floreat Athena	Perth Italia
1990	Floreat Athena	Perth Italia
1991	Floreat Athena	Perth Italia
1992	Perth Italia	Stirling Macedonia
1993	Perth Italia	Perth Italia
1994	Stirling Macedonia	Stirling Macedonia
1995	Stirling Macedonia	Stirling Macedonia
1996	Inglewood Falcons	Stirling Macedonia
1997	Floreat Athena	–
1998	Western Knights	Western Knights
1999	ECU Joondalup	Sorrento
2000	Fremantle City	Perth SC
2001	Sorrento	Perth SC
2002	Perth SC	Perth SC
2003	Perth SC	Perth SC
2004	Western Knights	Western Knights
2005	Perth SC	–
2006	Sorrento	–
2007	Floreat Athena	–
2008	Sorrento	Perth SC
2009	Western Knights	Perth SC
2010	Western Knights	Perth SC
2011	Balcatta	Perth SC
2012	Bayswater City	Sorrento
2013	Stirling Lions	Bayswater City

References :

== See also ==
- National Premier Leagues WA Women
