= Morley-Windmills SC =

Football club in Perth, Western Australia

Morley Windmills
- Full name: Morley Windmills Soccer Club
- Nickname: Windmills
- Founded: 1973
- Ground: Wotton Reserve
- Coach: John O’Reilly and Dan Evans
- League: WA Amateur League Premier Division
- 2025: 3rd of 12 (promoted); State League 2
- Website: http://www.morleywindmillssoccerclub.com.au/
Home colours	Away colours

Morley Windmills Soccer Club is an Australian semi-professional soccer club based in Morley, Perth, Western Australia. The club was founded 1973 from a merger of Windmills Soccer Club and Morley Soccer Club. They will compete the 2023 season in the Football West State League Division 2.

== History ==
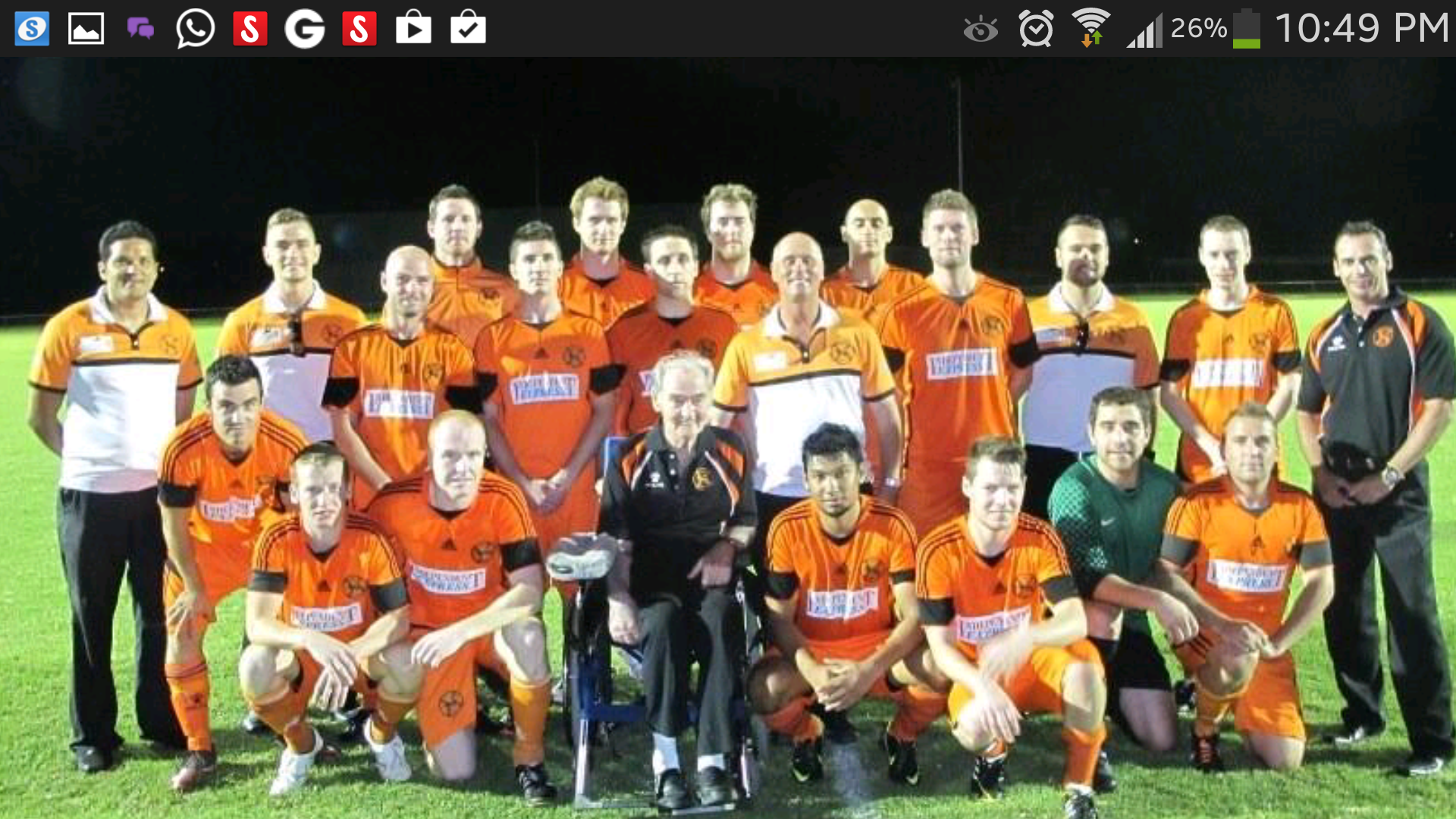
Morley Windmills 2013 squad

=== Background ===
The roots of Morley Windmills lay in the informal games of football organised by newly arrived Dutch immigrants, led by Henk Beumer, in 1950.

These games of football were enjoyed the Dutch community on Sundays and were combined with other social outings, including picnics.

Following a discussion at the Dutch Club in King Street, Perth, it was agreed to form Windmills Soccer Club.

In March, 1950, Windmills applied for entry into the Western Australian Soccer Football Association. The desire was to field one team of Dutch migrants who aspired to play their traditional sport in their new country.

It wasn't until the following year that Windmills received the green light and were accepted into the Third Division. Their first official game was in April, 1951, when Windmills defeated CMH 4–3.

In 1973 Windmills amalgamated with Morley Soccer Club to become Morley Windmills Soccer Club Inc. Soon after they moved into their current premises at Wotton Reserve, Embleton.

=== Early history (1952–1959) ===
With a solid start to their 1951 inaugural season, Morley Windmills continued a decent run in the third league, finishing 5th in 1952 and 3rd in 1953. This upwards trajectory saw the team earn a promotion by winning their league in 1954, and subsequently entered the WASFA Second Division (equivalent to First Division today) the following year.

Finding it difficult to adjust immediately to their new competitors, Windmills ended up finishing 6th out of the 9, in 1955. With a poor start behind them, the team began placing higher in their subsequent seasons. 1956 saw the Windmills carry a win for half their games to hold 4th place, and one spot down the following year.

Sitting steady at the top half of the leaderboard, Morley Windmills entered a stage of dominance in the WA soccer scene in 1958. With a win from their league, Windmills were finally given a chance to face off against the likes of Azzurri and Tricolore at the top division, where the club went on to finish in 4th place.

=== Semi-professional league (1960–1991) ===
With a continued denial of the right to play players, additional to arguments regarding playing grounds, 1960 saw the turmoil at WASFA subsequently lead to 8 clubs (including Windmills) breaking away to form their own association, known as the Soccer Federation of Western Australia (SFWA). With Western Australia's first semi-professional league, Windmills shot to a comfortable second place in their first year, with only 2 losses out of 14 games played. Against 10 teams the following year in 1961, Morley Windmills won the league and continued a moderate success throughout the 1960s and 1970s, including another state win in 1973.

To navigate the shifting engagement with Soccer in Western Australia, the SFWA began allowing more teams to enter the league. What began as an inaugural 8-team season, snowballed into an average of 10-12 participating clubs, and a 16-club season in 1991. Adapting to the pressures that came with this expansion, The Windmills merged with Morley Soccer Club in 1973 to create the hyphenate Morley-Windmills Soccer club and based themselves at their new (and current) premise of Wotton Reserve, Embleton. The same year also saw their first win of the new league with only one goal difference from Ascot in second place.

=== Professional Soccer Federation (1992–2003) ===
In 1992, Morley Windmills entered another break away league called the Professional Soccer League, who later merged with SFWA to form the Professional Soccer Federation (Soccer West Coast). A withdrawal from Soccer West Coast during the 1997 season saw the Windmills only play in the Amateur Premier Division for the following three years, until they rejoined Soccer West Coast in 2001.

Despite being based in a northern locality, Morley Windmills played against the likes of Armadale and South West Phoenix in First Division (south) in 2001, where the Windmills ended up in 5th place. 52 points totalled an 8th place the following year, with a drop to 11th in 2003.

== Honours ==
National Premier Leagues Western Australia Champions: 1961, 1973

National Premier Leagues Western Australia Runners-up: 1960, 1976

State Cup Winners: 1974, 1975

State Cup Runners-up: 1961

Top Four Cup Winners: 1962

Top Four Cup Runners-up: 1961, 1976

Night Series Winners: 1969, 1976

Night Series Runners-up: 1961

First Division Champions: 1980

Second Division Runners-up : 1987, 2017
