= Perth Azzurri SC =

Association football club in Perth, Western Australia

Perth Azzurri
- Full name: Perth Azzurri Soccer Club
- Nicknames: Azzurri, Sky Blues
- Founded: 1948; 78 years ago (as Perth Azzurri); 1987; 39 years ago (as Perth SC)
- Ground: Dorrien Gardens
- Capacity: 4,000
- President: Jason Marocchi
- Men's Head Coach: Kenny Lowe
- League: NPL Western Australia
- 2026: 4th of 12
- Website: perthsc.com.au
| Home colours | Away colours | Third colours |

Perth Azzurri is an Australian professional soccer club based in West Perth, Western Australia. The club was founded in 1987 as the result of a merger between three local clubs, though its pre-merger history is regarded to be that of Perth Azzurri after taking full control of the club in 2002. Perth currently competes in the National Premier Leagues Western Australia, with matches played at Dorrien Gardens.

== History ==
Perth SC was formed in 1987 as a result of a merger of Azzurri (formed 1948), East Fremantle Tricolore (formed 1953) and Balcatta Etna (formed 1977). After numerous meetings and discussions the new club known as, named Perth Italia Soccer Club, was formed. Of the three clubs that merged, Perth Azzurri was the most successful club having won 11 league titles. Between 1953 and 1987 East Fremantle Tricolore also won six league titles, including three straight wins between 1963 and 1965. Balcatta Etna had the least success, with only one league title.

The club had its beginnings when a group of boys joined with the initial intention of starting an Australian rules football club. The club faced friction from the footballing establishment which disapproved of Azzurri's passionate style of play.

Representatives from all three clubs strongly contributed in establishing the finest club and facilities in Western Australia. In the late 1980s the club registered the name Perth United in anticipation of joining the National Soccer League. However the club never managed to join the national league.

In 1991 Balcatta Etna left the merged club. In 1995 it was decided to change the name to Perth Soccer Club in order to broaden its appeal to a more mainstream audience. In 2002 Azzurri fully merged with Perth SC to become the club it is today, with East Fremantle Tricolore leaving the merged club to play in their own right in 2004.

Since October 2025, the club has been renamed to Perth Azzurri for all competitions, after the club’s board of management decided to bring back the Azzurri name as part of an amalgamation with the WA Italian Club. The club brought back the iconic Perth Azzurri logo that adorned their sky-blue shirts from the 1960s to 1980s.

== Men's team ==
=== Current squad ===
As of 21 March 2026

Note: Flags indicate national team as defined under FIFA eligibility rules; some limited exceptions apply. Players may hold more than one non-FIFA nationality.

| No. | Pos. | Nation | Player |
|---|---|---|---|
| 1 | GK | AUS | Liam Driscoll |
| 2 | DF | AUS | Will Formston |
| 3 | DF | AUS | Coby Sutton (captain) |
| 4 | DF | AUS | Luka Hirninger |
| 5 | MF | AUS | Samuel Riak |
| 6 | MF | SOM | Abdul Osman |
| 7 | FW | AUS | Ethan Banks |
| 8 | DF | AUS | Joshua Cala |
| 9 | FW | AUS | Gordon Perkins |
| 10 | FW | SRB | David Ninkovich |
| 11 | MF | AUS | Daniel Faichney |
| 12 | DF | SOM | Zayd Farah |
| 13 | DF | AUS | Julian Kelly |

| No. | Pos. | Nation | Player |
|---|---|---|---|
| 14 | MF | AUS | Sean O'Connor |
| 15 | FW | AUS | Jamie McNelis |
| 16 | DF | ITA | Federico Achilli |
| 17 | MF | AUS | Michael Scafetta |
| 18 | MF | AUS | Archie Whitfield |
| 19 | MF | AUS | Aiden Formston |
| 20 | MF | AUS | Paul Zimarino |
| 21 | DF | ENG | Kurtis Mogg |
| 22 | DF | AUS | Domenic Beltrami |
| 23 | MF | AUS | Marino Gojak |
| 24 | DF | AUS | Michael Huynh |
| — | MF | SSD | Jackson Morgan |
| — | MF | AUS | Harley Orr |

=== Honours ===
- Premiers – 1953, 1959, 1960, 1962 (WASFA), 1967, 1968, 1969, 1971, 1975, 1976, 1981, 1992, 1993, 2002, 2003, 2005, 2016, 2018, 2021
- Champions or Top Four/Five Cup –,1963, 1966, 1967, 1972, 1974, 1976, 1989, 1990, 1991, 1993, 2000, 2001, 2002, 2003, 2008, 2009, 2010, 2011, 2016, 2018, 2021
- D’Orsogna Cup – 1960, 1965, 1969, 1970, 1971, 1973, 1981, 1990, 1993
- WA State Cup 2001, 2005
- Night Series Cup – 1962, 1968, 1970, 1971, 1973, 1975, 1981
- Night Series – 1989, 1990, 1992, 1998, 2001, 2002, 2004, 2006, 2007, 2008, 2009, 2010

== Women's team ==
The Perth SC Women's team are one of the inaugural teams in the new National Premier Leagues WA Women competition (which commenced in 2020), and is a part of the National Premier Leagues Women’s structure. The team is coached by Peter Rakic with Jessica Byrne as his assistant. The Perth SC women's team finished second in the NPLW WA in the 2022 season.

=== Current squad ===
As of 21 August 2022

Note: Flags indicate national team as defined under FIFA eligibility rules; some limited exceptions apply. Players may hold more than one non-FIFA nationality.

| No. | Pos. | Nation | Player |
|---|---|---|---|
| 1 | GK | AUS | Rebecca Bennett |
| 2 | DF | AUS | Nadia Harvey |
| 3 | DF | AUS | Alyssa Van Heurck |
| 4 | MF | AUS | Faye Phillips |
| 6 | MF | AUS | Zoee Spadano |
| 7 | FW | AUS | Liana Cook |
| 8 | MF | AUS | Abbey Meakins |
| 9 | FW | AUS | Ella Lincoln |

| No. | Pos. | Nation | Player |
|---|---|---|---|
| 10 | FW | AUS | Taneesha Baker |
| 11 | FW | AUS | Emma McMurdo |
| 13 | FW | AUS | Jaymee Gibbons |
| 14 | FW | AUS | Caitlin Doeglas |
| 19 | DF | AUS | Jessica Byrne |
| 20 | FW | AUS | Natalia Beltrami |
| 22 | FW | AUS | Courtney Butlion |

=== Honours ===
- 2024: Football West State Cup Winners

== Notable former players ==
- Ron Adair
- Danielle Brogan
- Anthony Carbone
- Bobby Charlton (guest player)
- Alessandro Circati
- Gianfranco Circati
- Chris Coyne
- Amine Dinar
- Dino Djulbic
- Robbie Dunn
- Adrian Madaschi
- Arno Bertogna(Aust National)
- Gary Marocchi
- Scott Miller
- Shaun Murphy
- Gareth Naven
- Dylan Tombides
- Adrian Caceres
- Robert Puca
