= Rockingham City FC =

Australian association football club

Rockingham City
- Full name: Rockingham City Football Club
- Nickname: Rocky
- Founded: 1970
- Ground: Lark Hill Sports Complex
- Capacity: 3,000
- President: Fraser Marr
- Coach: Jordan Rhodes
- League: State League 2
- 2025: 10th of 12
- Website: https://www.rcfc.net.au
Home colours	Away colours

Rockingham City FC is an association football club based in Rockingham, Western Australia established in 1970. Based at the Lark Hill Sports Complex which they moved to in 2008. Rockingham City also hosts junior teams starting at Under 6's, senior amateur and women's teams. The club will compete in 2025 in the Football West State League Division 2.

== History ==
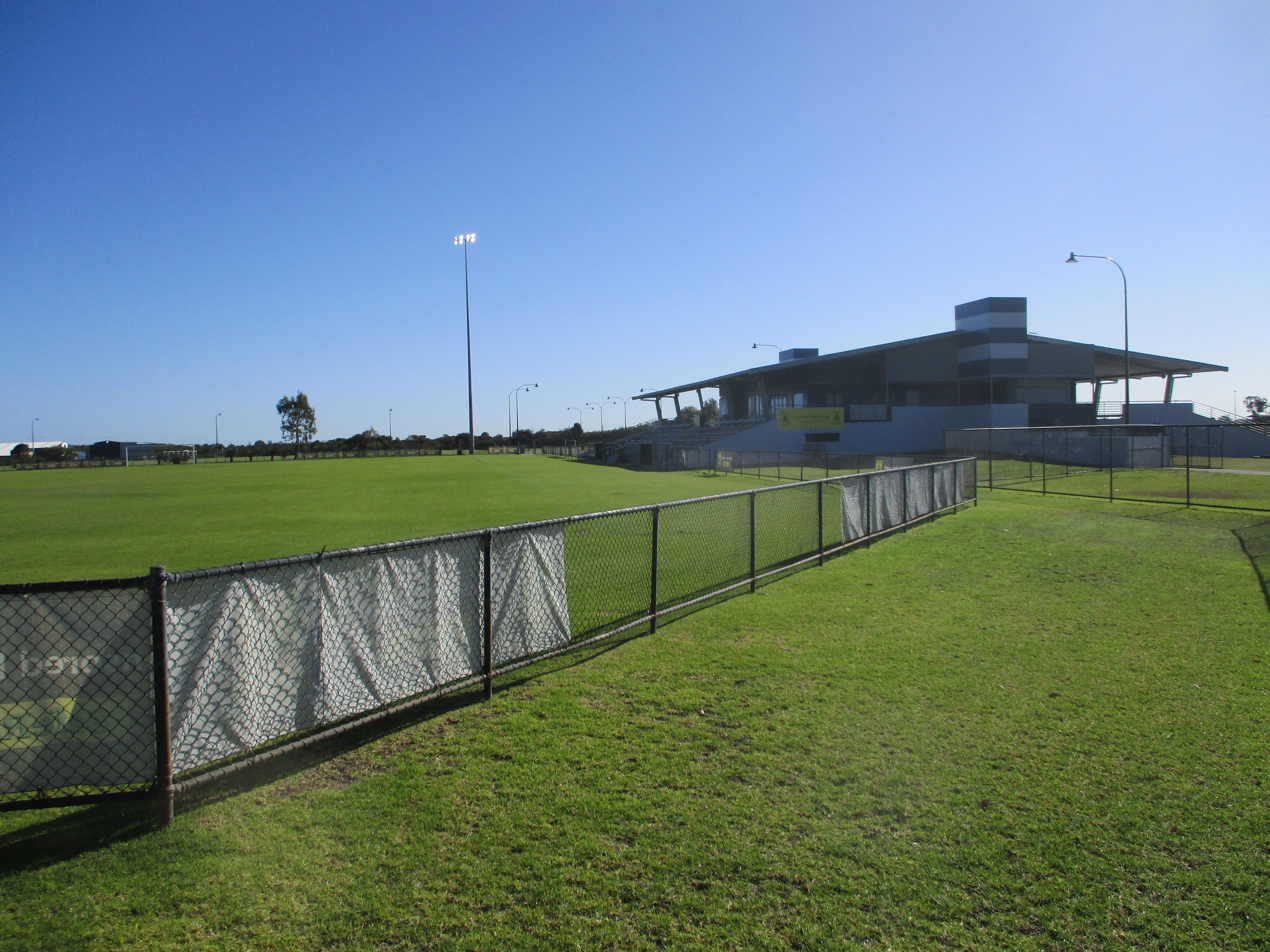
Rockingham City FC home ground and club house at Lark Hill Sports Complex.

Originally based at the Rockingham City park oval, the team moved to the then new venue of Dowling Street in the mid to late 1970s. They moved to their current home field at the Endeavour Homes Stadium,Lark Hill Sports Complex in 2008.

== Current squad ==
As of 30 March 2025

Note: Flags indicate national team as defined under FIFA eligibility rules; some limited exceptions apply. Players may hold more than one non-FIFA nationality.

No.	Pos.	Nation	Player
1	GK	ENG	Kieran Shail
2	GK	AUS	Phil Herschel
3	DF	ENG	Evan Ludgate
4	DF	AUS	Harry Geeves (captain)
5	DF	AUS	Brad Mallinder
6	DF	AUS	Harry Quigley (vice-captain)
7	DF	AUS	Josh Rimmer
8	MF	AUS	Dylan Rogers
10	FW	IRL	Shane Boyle
11	MF	AUS	Declan Collins
12	MF	POR	Marco Florenca
13	MF	ENG	Harry Stonehouse
14	MF	SCO	Ryan Kennedy
15	DF	AUS	Noah Wittstrom Lea
16	FW	ENG	Taylor Carter
17	FW	ZIM	Shaun Mukwevho
18	FW	ENG	Raph Ghomba
19	FW	AUS	Delano Adams
20	DF	AUS	Jules Anfuso
21	FW	AUS	Sura Yigletu
22	MF	SCO	Alex McMullan
99	DF	ENG	Liam Cutts

== Honours ==
First Division winners: 1976, 2018

Second Division winners: 1973, 1983

Green And Gold Charity Cup Winners: 2020

== Notable past players ==
- Ernie Hannigan
