= Gosnells City FC =

- Full name: Gosnells City Football Club
- Nickname: Gossies
- Founded: 1969
- Ground: Walter Padbury Reserve, Thornlie
- Capacity: approx. 200
- President: Ossie Pereira
- League: State League 2
- 2025: 12th of 12 (relegated); State League 1
- Website: https://www.gosnellscityfc.org.au/
Home colours	Away colours

Gosnells City Football Club is a football (soccer) club based in Thornlie, Western Australia. The club currently (2023) competes in the Football West State League Division 2.

== History ==
The club was established in 1969, as Gosnells Town Soccer Club, with its home ground at Canning Vale Oval, in the then Shire of Gosnells. The club moved to Walter Padbury Reserve in 1974, and the council-built clubroom was opened in 1975.

The Club merged in 1993 with Ferndale, changing its name to Gosnells Ferndale United. Kelmscott Roos joined in 1995, and the club reverted to its previous name, and then later became known as Southside United. At the start of the 2004 season the Club changed the team name back to Gosnells City.
