= Swan United FC =

Swan United
- Full name: Swan United Football Club
- Nicknames: Swans, Swanies, The Black Ducks
- Founded: 1984
- Ground: Swan Italian Club
- Capacity: 2,000
- President: Ben Kelly
- Manager: Lee Taylor
- League: State League 2
- 2025: 12th of 12 (relegated)
- Website: http://www.swanunitedfc.com/
Home colours	Away colours

Swan United Football Club is an Australian Football Club based in the Swan Valley region, in Perth. The club will compete in 2022 in the Football West State League Division 2.

== History ==
The Swan IC United Soccer Club was formed in 1984 by members of the Italian community in the Swan Valley. The club was founded after the Swan Italian Club, headed by John Steffanelli, decided to start a semi-professional team in the Swan Valley.

In 1985 the club played its first season in amateur ranks in 1985. After finishing third in their inaugural season they were accepted in the state fourth division for the 1986 season.

After playing the first two seasons at Jack Mann Oval in 1987 the club moved to new facilities at the Swan Italian Club.

The club first made the Premier League in 1994 and have been in the top tier since then nearly every year up until 2010. They won their first major trophy in 2003 when they won the Association Cup, and successfully defended the title in 2004, with a Gary Marocchi-led team beating Fremantle City.

In 2008 the club merged with Swan Districts Junior Soccer Association and re-branded itself as Swan United Football Club (SUFC) to represent the unity of the Swan Valley's two largest football clubs, and extended the clubs capability to offer football to participants of all ages groups (Juniors & Seniors) and ability levels.

The club played in the First Division from 2011 to 2015, and relegated to the Second Division for the 2016 season. After spending four seasons in the Second Division, they returned to the First Division in 2020 via the playoffs. In 2020 despite finishing second bottom they were not relegated due to it being a COVID interrupted season. In 2021 the club finished in 11th place and was relegated to the second division by the playoffs. Swan will compete in the second division in 2022.

== Coaching team ==
- Head coach : Lee Taylor
- Assistant coach: Adam Mayer-Diamond

== Honours ==
- Association Cup Winners: 2003, 2004
- First Division winners: 1999
- P.S.L. Winners: 1992
