= Balcatta Etna FC =

Association football club in Perth, Western Australia

Balcatta Etna
- Full name: Balcatta Etna Football Club
- Nickname: Etna
- Founded: 1977
- Ground: Grindleford Reserve
- Capacity: 1,000
- Chairman: Peter Carlino
- Manager: Terry Nicolaou
- League: NPL Western Australia
- 2025: 10th of 12
- Website: balcattafc.com.au
Home colours	Away colours

Balcatta Etna Football Club is an Australian semi-professional soccer club based in Balcatta, Perth, Western Australia. They compete in the National Premier Leagues Western Australia.

== History ==
In the first year, 1978, playing at the new home ground, Reader Reserve in Hector St, Mt Yokine. Etna acquired fifth position on the ladder. In the second year, 1979, Etna finished seventh position on the ladder.

In 2013 the club changed its name from Balcatta Soccer Club to Balcatta FC.

On 30th November 2021, the club re-branded and officially became Balcatta Etna FC.

== Colours and Badge ==
The major colours for Balcatta Etna are blue and red.

The Balcatta Etna badge contains three sections. The top section shows the club's Italian heritage through the Italian flag and the words 'Balcatta Etna FC' beneath it. On the bottom left, the two main colours blue and red are displayed in vertical stripes. Next to it is Mount Etna erupting a football, showing the cultural heritage of the club's founders.

== Stadium ==
Balcatta Etna play their home matches at Grindleford Reserve, which has grandstand seating for 240 supporters. In December 2022, works started to upgrade the lighting on the training pitches and to install match lights on the main pitch for the first time in the club's history.

== Current First Team Men's Squad ==
As of 7 February 2026

Note: Flags indicate national team as defined under FIFA eligibility rules; some limited exceptions apply. Players may hold more than one non-FIFA nationality.

No.	Pos.	Nation	Player
20	GK	MKD	Stefan Sotirovski
4	DF	ITA	Luke Alessandrino
5	DF	MKD	Phillip Radeski
14	DF	AUS	Christopher Tilson
15	DF	AUS	BalaNoah Shamaki
6	MF	AUS	Jack Allen
8	MF	AUS	Jesse Fuller
10	MF	AUS	Jonathan Stynes
19	MF	AUS	Owen Yamungu
9	FW	AUS	Darius Ghinea
11	FW	AUS	Charlie Betts

No.	Pos.	Nation	Player
1	GK	AUS	Riley Stephenson
2	DF	AUS	James Fanelli
7	DF	AUS	Hayden Lowe
17	DF	AUS	Jared Flavel
16	MF	AUS	Rene Kisesa
18	MF	AUS	Ethan Mom
21	MF	AUS	Steph Christopher

== First Team Men's Coaching Staff ==
- Head coach: Terry Nicolaou
- Football Operations Manager: Neil Alessandrino
- Goalkeeping coach: Scott Andrews
- Assistant coach: Vinnie Kapur
- Assistant coach: Gavin Knight
- Team Manager: Adrian Lane (Ade)
- Property & Kit Manager: Paul Calcei
- Physiotherapist: Alvin Chen
- Technical director: Salv Todaro

== Honours ==
Football West State League

- Minor Premiers: 2011
- Coach of the Year: Michael Roki 2011
- Player of the Year Steve Burton 2011

Football West State League Division 1

- Winners: 2009
- Night Series Winners: 2008
- Coach of the Year: Salv Todaro 2009

Football West State League Division 2

- Winners:1981
- Runners Up: 1994

== Women's team ==
The Balcatta Etna Women's team are one of the inaugural teams in the new National Premier Leagues WA Women competition (which commenced in 2020), and is a part of the National Premier Leagues Women's structure. Previously they had been a part of the Women's Premier League competition (2018–2019), and were Champions in the 2018 season. Prior to that, they were a part of the Women's State League Premier Division (since at least 2007).
