= Fremantle City FC =

Fremantle City
- Full name: Fremantle City FC
- Founded: 2014
- Ground: Hilton Park
- Capacity: 2,000
- President: Tony Estrano
- Head coach: Scott Miller
- League: NPL Western Australia
- 2025: 11th of 12
- Website: https://fremantlecityfc.com.au
Home colours

Fremantle City Football Club is an Australian soccer club based in Fremantle, Western Australia. Formed in 2014 through the merger of Fremantle United and East Fremantle Tricolore, the club competes in the men's and women's divisions of the National Premier Leagues Western Australia. Tricolore was one of the state's most prominent clubs in the post-war period, winning five top-flight titles, while Fremantle United enjoyed sustained success in the amateur leagues, claiming eight championships between 1988 and 2008.

== History ==
Fremantle City was formed in 2014 through the merger of Fremantle United, formed in 1979, and East Fremantle Tricolore, founded in 1953. Both clubs had roots in the local Italian-Australian community.

=== East Fremantle Tricolore ===
Tricolore was founded in 1953. After entering the state league in 1960, the club clinched three consecutive league titles from 1963 to 1965 and added two more championships in 1970 and 1972. Their success extended to the D'Orsogna Cup, securing victories in 1961, 1962, 1966, 1968, 1972, 1976, 1978, and 1979. In 1987, Tricolore joined with Perth Azzurri and Balcatta Etna to form Perth SC. In 2004, Tricolore left Perth SC to compete again in their own right.

=== Fremantle United ===
Fremantle United was formed in 1979. They played in black and white stripes, in tribute to Italian club Juventus. Between 1982 and 2011, Fremantle United competed in the amateur leagues, spending most of the time in the Amateur Premier Division. They won the Amateur Premier Division eight times - in 1988, 1989, 1991, 1992, 1994, 1998, 2000, and 2008 - and were runners-up on seven occasions. They joined the State League Second Division in 2012, where they played until the formation of Fremantle City.

=== Fremantle City ===
In 2018, President Maurice submitted a formal expression of interest to join the A-League. Fremantle City have spent the last 3 seasons in the NPL, after winning promotion in 2023. They are still yet to win the NPL, with their best finishing position being 3rd in 2024.

== Current squad ==
As of 3 December 2024

Note: Flags indicate national team as defined under FIFA eligibility rules; some limited exceptions apply. Players may hold more than one non-FIFA nationality.

No.	Pos.	Nation	Player
1	GK	AUS	Luke Radonich
2	DF	AUS	Alex Silla
3	DF	AUS	Nicolas Santalucia
4	DF	AUS	Ben Steele
7	FW	AUS	Jack Steele
8	FW	ENG	Charlie Chechlacz
9	FW	AUS	Sam Cook
10	MF	AUS	Nicholas Ambrogio
11	MF	AUS	Shubham Mokala
12	GK	AUS	Ryan Barker
13	DF	AUS	George Festa
14	MF	AUS	Ali Gholami

No.	Pos.	Nation	Player
15	MF	SCO	John Chalmers
16	DF	AUS	Anthony Topini
17	MF	AUS	Charlie Betts
18	FW	IRL	Karl Moody
20	FW	AUS	Taj Bingwa
21	FW	AUS	Oscar Holden
23	DF	AUS	Riley Woodcock
—	MF	AUS	Cameron Edwards
—	GK	AUS	Matthew Brandt
—	DF	AUS	Josh Risdon
