= Football West State League =

Football league in Western Australia

- Founded: 1996 (Football West State League 1); 2011 (Football West State League 2)
- Country: Australia
- State: Western Australia
- Number of clubs: 24: Division 1: 12; Division 2: 12
- Level on pyramid: 4 and 5 (notionally)
- Promotion to: NPL Western Australia
- Relegation to: Football West Amateur League
- Domestic cup(s): National; Australia Cup; State; WA State Challenge Cup
- Current champions: Dianella White Eagles Div 1 (2025); Quinns FC Div 2 (2025)

The Football West State League is a regional Australian semi-professional soccer league comprising teams from Western Australia consisting of two divisions. The league sits at Levels 2 and 3 on the Western Australian league system (Levels 3 and 4 of the overall Australian league system). The competition is administered by Football West, the governing body of the sport in the state. Division 1 has been called the All Flags State League Division 1 due to sponsorship arrangements since 2011.

== History ==
Mandurah City were the 2015 champions but did not meet all of the Football West eligibility criteria to be promoted to the 2016 National Premier Leagues WA. Mandurah City and Joondalup United were promoted after the 2016 season to the NPL WA to make it a 14 team division, Mandurah City were relegated in 2017 after being defeated by Forrestfield United in a promotion/relegation play off.

After review by Football West the 2019 NPLWA season was decided to return to a 12 team competition; as a result, Subiaco AFC, Forrestfield United and Joondalup United were relegated and Rockingham City were promoted.

In 2020, promotion and relegation was suspended for the season, due to the impacts on the competition from the COVID-19 pandemic in Australia.

== Format ==
The league operates with a promotion and relegation system. Promotion for the Champion of Division 1 to the National Premier Leagues Western Australia (NPL WA) was introduced for the 2015 season, and is subject to eligibility criteria. The team that finishes as Premier (top of the table) is promoted to the NPL, with the teams that finished 2nd, 3rd and 4th competing in a promotion/relegation playoff series with the NPL team that finished 11th.

The team that finishes bottom of the table is relegated to the Football West State League Division 2, with the 2nd bottom team competing in a promotion/relegation playoff series with the teams that finished 2nd, 3rd and 4th in the Football West State League Division 2. In 2020, promotion and relegation was suspended for the season, due to the impact on the competition from the COVID-19 pandemic in Australia.

== Current members ==
These are the clubs who competed in the Football West State League in the 2026 season.

Locations of the 2026 Football West State League clubs by division
– Division 1 – Division 2
Locations of the 2024 Football West State League clubs by division
– Division 1 – Division 2

=== Division 1 ===
- Cockburn City
- Curtin University
- Floreat Athena
- Gwelup Croatia
- Inglewood United
- Joondalup City
- Kingsley Westside
- Mandurah City
- Murdoch University Melville
- Quinns Rock
- Subiaco
- UWA-Nedlands

=== Division 2 ===
- Ashfield
- Balga
- Canning City
- Carramar Shamrock Rovers
- East Perth
- Forrestfield United
- Gosnells City
- Kalamunda City
- Rockingham City
- Swan United
- Wanneroo City
- Wembley Downs
