= Cockburn City SC =

Football club in Perth, Western Australia

Cockburn City
- Full name: Cockburn City Soccer Club
- Nickname: The Burn
- Founded: 1929; 97 years ago
- Ground: Dalmatinac Park
- Capacity: 2,000
- Chairman: Heidi Lazzaro
- Manager: Mirko Jelicic
- League: State League 2
- 2025: 2nd of 12, (promoted)
- Website: www.cockburncity.org
Home colours	Away colours

Cockburn City Soccer Club is an Australian soccer club currently playing in the State League 2 WA. They play their home games at Dalmatinac Park and train at Beale Park.

== History ==
Cockburn City Soccer Club's origin goes back to 1929 when they were known as Spearwood Rovers, and after the 1964 season they amalgamated with Britannia (who had renamed a year earlier from Fremantle City) to become Cockburn United. A few months earlier, some of the Spearwood Rovers club had joined forces with Balkans Dalmatinac, to create Fremantle Dalmatinac (who were renamed Spearwood Dalmatinac in 1974). The two clubs enjoyed success in the period after, with facilities close to each other at Dalmatinac Park and Beale Park. The clubs reunited in 1998 under the negotiations of Angelko Petkovich and John Mijacika and became Cockburn City Soccer Club. The facilities at both parks are still used by the club's Junior and Senior teams. Cockburn City compete in the Australia Cup twice in 2016 & 2022.

== Men's team ==
=== Current squad ===
As of 24 July 2022

Note: Flags indicate national team as defined under FIFA eligibility rules; some limited exceptions apply. Players may hold more than one non-FIFA nationality.

No.	Pos.	Nation	Player
4	DF	SCO	Euen Grant
5	DF	AUS	Milan Ognjenovic
6	MF	AUS	Andrew Rankin
7	FW	AUS	Ben Thorpe
8	MF	AUS	Isaac McVittie
9	FW	AUS	Rory McGrath
10	FW	AUS	David Araya
11	FW	AUS	Oliver Carr
12	MF	FRA	Louis Ernoul de la Cheneliere
13	MF	AUS	Oliver Palmer
14	FW	AUS	Lukas Caceres
15	FW	AUS	James Bourne
16	MF	AUS	Mattheus Kilka

No.	Pos.	Nation	Player
17	DF	AUS	Callan Baker
18	FW	AUS	Reuben Reddy
19	MF	AUS	Frankie Kinnen
21	DF	AUS	Alessandro Basto (captain)
22	DF	AUS	Tom Strickland
23	GK	AUS	Ryan Barker
24	DF	AUS	Blake Pesich
25	MF	AUS	Breckan Baker
32	GK	AUS	Isaac Driessen
38	FW	AUS	Matthew Bowen
40	GK	AUS	Ben Radonich
60	GK	AUS	Robert Sinclair

=== Current coaching staff ===
- First-team coach: Mirko Jelicic
- Assistant coach: Dale Wingell
- Goalkeeping coaches: Christopher Adams, Jason Petkovic

=== Honours (League Positions) ===
==== (as Spearwood/Fremantle Dalmatinac) ====
- 1964: 1st – Semi-Pro Second Division
- 1974: 1st – Semi-Pro First Division
- 1979: 1st – Semi-Pro Premier League
- 1982: 1st – Semi-Pro Premier League
- 1986: 1st – Semi-Pro Premier League

==== (as Cockburn United/Spearwood Rovers) ====
- 1963: 1st – Semi-Pro First Division
- 1994: 1st – Semi-Pro Second Division

==== (as Cockburn City) ====
- 2012: 1st – State League Division 1

Ref:

=== Notable past players ===
List includes players from Cockburn youth or senior teams that have gone on to represent the Australian national team.

- Robert Zabica
- Jason Petkovic
- David Tarka
- Scott Miller

== Women's team ==
The Cockburn city women's team last played in the 2014 Women's State League Premier Division in the 2014 season.
