= 2016 WA State Challenge Cup =

2016 Cool Ridge Cup
Tournament details
- Teams: 65

Final positions
- Champions: Floreat Athena

Western Australian soccer clubs will compete in 2016 for the Football West State Cup, known for sponsorship reasons as the Cool Ridge Cup. Clubs entered from the National Premier Leagues WA, the two divisions of the State League, a limited number of teams from various divisions of the 2016 Amateur League competition, and from regional teams from the South West, Goldfields, Great Southern and Midwest regions.

This knockout competition was won by Floreat Athena, their sixth title.

The competition also served as the Western Australian Preliminary Rounds for the 2016 FFA Cup. The two finalists – Cockburn City and Floreat Athena – qualified for the final rounds, entering at the Round of 32.

== Schedule ==
A total of 65 teams took part in the competition, from Perth-based and regional-based competitions.

Round	Draw	Main dates	Number of fixtures	Clubs	New entries this round	Levels of new entrants
Round 1	3 Feb	27–28 Feb	9	65 → 56	18	Amateur League lower Divisions; regional teams from Midwest and South West Soccer Associations
Round 2	29 Feb	6–13 Mar	11	56 → 45	13	Amateur League Premier Division; regional teams from Goldfields and Great Southern Associations
Round 3	14 Mar	19–20 Mar	17	45 → 28	23	Football West State League Division 1; Football West State League Division 2
Round 4	21 Mar	28 Mar	12	28 → 16	7	National Premier Leagues WA
Round 5	29 Mar	25 Apr	8	16 → 8	4	National Premier Leagues WA – Top 4 teams from 2015
Round 6	26 Apr	14–15 May	4	8 → 4	none	
Round 7	16 May	6 Jun	2	4 → 2	none	
Final	–	23 Jul	1	2 → 1	none	

== First round ==
The round numbers conform to a common format throughout the 2016 FFA Cup preliminary rounds. A total of 18 teams took part in this stage of the competition, from lower divisions of the Amateur League, and from regional teams entering from the South West and Midwest regions. Matches in this round were played on 27–28 February.

Tie no	Home team (tier)	Score	Away team (tier)
1	Bunbury Dynamos (-)	5–0	Eaton Dardanup (-)
2	Margaret River (-)	7–0	Busselton SC (-)
3	Geographe Bay (-)	Walkover	Bunbury United (-)
4	Olympic Heat (-)	Walkover	Geraldton Rovers (-)
5	East Fremantle Tricolore (-)	9–1	Tuart Hill (-)

Tie no	Home team (tier)	Score	Away team (tier)
6	Liberties FC (9)	Walkover	Kwinana United (6)
7	Backpackers FC (7)	8–0	Western United (-)
8	Maccabi (6)	1–2	Jaguar FC (6)
9	Ballajura AFC (7)	3–1	Koondoola Red Falcons (-)

== Second round ==
A total of 22 teams took part in this stage of the competition, from the Amateur League Premier Division (11 teams), from regional teams entering from the Goldfields and Great Southern regions, and the winners from the previous round. Matches in this round were completed by 13 March 2016.

Tie no	Home team (tier)	Score	Away team (tier)
1	Margaret River (-)	Walkover	Perth Royals (5)
2	Bunbury United (-)	3–1	Southern Spirit (5)
3	Kwinana United (6)	9–1	Geraldton Rovers (-)
4	Ballajura AFC (7)	1–9	Bunbury Dynamos (-)
5	North Perth United (5)	Walkover	Belmont Villa (5)
6	Gwelup Croatia (5)	2–1	Wembley Downs (5)

Tie no	Home team (tier)	Score	Away team (tier)
7	Kingsley (5)	3–2	East Fremantle Tricolore (-)
8	Boulder City (-)	Walkover	Albany Bayswater (-)
9	Jaguar FC (6)	2–2†	Hamersley Rovers (5)
Hamersley advance 4–3 on penalties.
10	Fremantle Croatia (5)	4–4†	Backpackers FC (7)
Backpackers FC advance 4–2 on penalties.
11	North Lake (5)	3–1	Port Kennedy (5)

Notes:

- † = After Extra Time

== Third round ==
A total of 34 teams took part in this stage of the competition. New teams that enter at this round were from Football West State League Division 1 (12 teams) and Football West State League Division 2 (11 teams). Matches in this round were played by 20 March 2016.

Tie no	Home team (tier)	Score	Away team (tier)
1	Canning City (3)	2–2†	Kwinana United (6)
Canning City advance 3–2 on penalties.
2	Dianella White Eagles (3)	4–2	Bunbury United (-)
3	Joondalup United (3)	3–4	Ashfield (3)
4	Margaret River (-)	2–1	Balga (4)
5	Shamrock Rovers Perth (3)	0–1	Gwelup Croatia (5)
6	Mandurah City (3)	5–1	Joondalup City (4)
7	Olympic Kingsway (4)	0–4	Forrestfield United (3)
8	Rockingham City (3)	1–2	Fremantle City United (4)
9	Melville City (4)	0–1	North Lake (5)

Tie no	Home team (tier)	Score	Away team (tier)
10	Swan United (4)	3–0	Ellenbrook United (4)
11	Quinns (4)	1–4	Gosnells City (3)
12	Wanneroo City (4)	1–4	South West Phoenix (3)
13	Morley-Windmills (4)	4–1	North Perth United (5)
14	Western Knights (3)	11–1	Boulder City (-)
15	UWA-Nedlands (3)	4–1	Hamersley Rovers (5)
16	Kingsley (5)	3–3†	Curtin University (4)
Curtin Uni advance 5–4 on penalties.
17	Backpackers FC (7)	2–0	Bunbury Dynamos (-)

Notes:

- † = After Extra Time

== Fourth round ==
A total of 24 teams took part in this stage of the competition. 7 of the 12 Clubs from the National Premier Leagues WA entered into the competition at this stage, with the exception of the top four teams from the 2015 Season who enter in the next round, and Perth Glory Youth who were not eligible. Matches in this round were played on 28 March 2016.

Tie no	Home team (tier)	Score	Away team (tier)
1	Armadale (2)	4–2	Fremantle City United (4)
2	Gwelup Croatia (5)	3–3†	Ashfield (3)
Ashfield advance 3–0 on penalties.
3	Cockburn City (2)	3–1	Mandurah City (3)
4	ECU Joondalup (2)	0–1	Dianella White Eagles (3)
5	Curtin University (4)	4–2†	Backpackers FC (7)
6	Margaret River (-)	3–3†	Swan United (4)
Football Margaret River advance 5–4 on penalties.

Tie no	Home team (tier)	Score	Away team (tier)
7	Balcatta (2)	5–4	Forrestfield United (3)
8	South West Phoenix (3)	0–3	Inglewood United (2)
9	Stirling Lions (2)	5–2	Morley-Windmills (4)
10	Western Knights (3)	2–4	Canning City (3)
11	North Lake (5)	0–1	UWA-Nedlands (3)
12	Gosnells City (3)	3–1	Subiaco AFC (2)

Notes:

- † = After Extra Time.

== Fifth round ==
A total of 16 teams took part in this stage of the competition, with the matches in this round played on 25 April 2016. 4 of the 12 Clubs from the National Premier Leagues WA entered into the competition at this stage, being the top four teams from the 2015 Season.

Tie no	Home team (tier)	Score	Away team (tier)
1	Margaret River (-)	0–8	Gosnells City (3)
2	Armadale (2)	3–2	Sorrento FC (2)
3	Ashfield (3)	1–2	Balcatta (2)
4	Cockburn City (2)	2–0	Bayswater City (2)

Tie no	Home team (tier)	Score	Away team (tier)
5	Floreat Athena (2)	5–1	UWA-Nedlands (3)
6	Curtin University (4)	2–0	Canning City (3)
7	Inglewood United (2)	7–1	Dianella White Eagles (3)
8	Stirling Lions (2)	2–1	Perth SC (2)

== Sixth round ==
A total of 8 teams took part in this stage of the competition, with the matches in this round played on 14 May 2016.

Tie no	Home team (tier)	Score	Away team (tier)
1	Floreat Athena (2)	6–3	Armadale (2)
2	Cockburn City (2)	5–1	Gosnells City (3)
3	Balcatta (2)	1–2†	Inglewood United (2)
4	Stirling Lions (2)	5–2	Curtin University (4)

Notes:

- † = After Extra Time

== Seventh round ==
A total of 4 teams took part in this stage of the competition, with the matches in this round played on 6 June 2016. The two victorious teams in this round qualify for the 2016 FFA Cup Round of 32.

Tie no	Home team (tier)	Score	Away team (tier)
1	Inglewood United (2)	2–9	Floreat Athena (2)
2	Stirling Lions (2)	1–2	Cockburn City (2)

== Final ==
The 2016 Cool Ridge Cup Final was played on 23 July 2016, at the neutral venue of Dorrien Gardens.

23 July 2016	Floreat Athena	1–0	Cockburn City	Dorrien Gardens
	Stynes 90+3'	Report
