= 2019 Football West season =

Football West Season 2019
- League: National Premier Leagues Western Australia
- Sport: Soccer
- Duration: 2019

NPL WA Season
- Champions: Perth SC
- Premiers: Perth SC

State Cup
- Cup Winners: Floreat Athena

Football West seasons
- ← 2018 2020 →

The 2019 Football West season was the 119th season of competitive association football in Western Australia and the sixth season since the establishment of the National Premier Leagues WA (NPL).

== Pre-season changes ==
2018 League	Promoted to league	Relegated from league
NPL WA	Rockingham City	Forrestfield United; Joondalup United; Subiaco AFC
State League 1	Olympic Kingsway	Dianella White Eagles; Joondalup City
State League 2	–	–
Women's Premier League	South West Phoenix	UWA-Nedlands

== League Tables ==
=== 2019 National Premier Leagues WA ===
The competition reverted to a twelve-team format, and was played over 22 rounds, followed by an end of season Top 4 Cup competition. Promotion and Relegation was dependent on whether Gwelup Croatia (as the team finishing first in the State League 1) met a series of eligibility criteria, which they did; this meant that Stirling Lions would be relegated for the following season.

Pos	Team	Pld	W	D	L	GF	GA	GD	Pts	Qualification or relegation
1	Perth SC (C)	22	15	4	3	53	21	+32	49	2019 National Premier Leagues Finals
2	Inglewood United	22	11	5	6	38	36	+2	38	2019 WA Top Four Cup
3	Floreat Athena	22	11	4	7	48	37	+11	37	2019 WA Top Four Cup
4	Balcatta	22	9	6	7	26	26	0	33	2019 WA Top Four Cup
5	Bayswater City	22	9	5	8	45	29	+16	32	
6	Sorrento	22	9	4	9	40	41	−1	31	
7	Cockburn City	22	8	4	10	38	38	0	28	
8	Perth Glory Youth	22	7	5	10	35	39	−4	26	
9	Rockingham City	22	8	2	12	37	49	−12	26	
10	Armadale	22	7	4	11	35	45	−10	25	
11	ECU Joondalup	22	4	11	7	24	32	−8	23	
12	Stirling Lions (R)	22	5	4	13	16	42	−26	19	Relegation to the 2020 WA State League 1

Source: sportstg.com
Rules for classification: 1) points; 2) goal difference; 3) number of goals scored.
(C) Champions; (R) Relegated

==== Top Four Cup ====
Semi-finals
1	Perth SC	1
2	Inglewood United	3
3	Floreat Athena	3
4	Balcatta	2

Preliminary Final
1	Perth SC (a.e.t.)	2
3	Floreat Athena	1

Grand Final
2	Inglewood United	1
1	Perth SC	2

=== 2019 WA State League 1 ===
The 2019 WA State League 1 season was played over 22 rounds.

Pos	Team	Pld	W	D	L	GF	GA	GD	Pts	Qualification or relegation
1	Gwelup Croatia (C, P)	20	13	5	2	52	28	+24	44	Promotion to the 2020 National Premier Leagues WA
2	Western Knights	20	11	6	3	53	37	+16	39	
3	Fremantle City	20	10	8	2	39	27	+12	38	
4	Olympic Kingsway	20	9	6	5	47	29	+18	33	
5	Ashfield	20	9	6	5	32	24	+8	33	
6	Forrestfield United	20	6	9	5	30	33	−3	27	
7	Mandurah City	20	5	5	10	35	39	−4	20	
8	UWA-Nedlands	20	5	6	9	31	34	−3	21	
9	Joondalup United	20	6	2	12	39	54	−15	20	
10	Subiaco AFC	20	4	4	12	28	47	−19	16	
11	Morley-Windmills (R)	20	3	1	16	28	62	−34	10	2019 relegation play-offs
12	South West Phoenix	0	0	0	0	0	0	0	0	Withdrew prior to the start of the season

Updated to match(es) played on 7 September 2019. Source: sportstg.com
Rules for classification: 1) points; 2) goal difference; 3) number of goals scored.
(C) Champions; (P) Promoted; (R) Relegated

==== Inter-Divisional promotion/relegation play-offs ====
Semi-finals
SL1 11	Morley-Windmills	0	4	4
SL2 4	Swan United	4	3	7
SL2 2	Gosnells City	3	0	3
SL2 3	Murdoch University Melville	1	3	4

Final
Swan United	2	3	5
Murdoch University Melville	1	0	1

=== 2019 WA State League 2 ===
The 2019 WA State League 2 season was played over 22 rounds.

Pos	Team	Pld	W	D	L	GF	GA	GD	Pts	Qualification or relegation
1	Quinns (P)	22	18	3	1	69	17	+52	57	Promotion to the 2020 WA State League 1
2	Gosnells City	22	14	4	4	50	21	+29	46	2019 promotion play-offs
3	Murdoch University Melville	22	14	2	6	63	30	+33	44	2019 promotion play-offs
4	Swan United (P)	22	11	5	6	51	36	+15	38	2019 promotion play-offs
5	Balga	22	10	7	5	53	46	+7	37	
6	Joondalup City	22	8	3	11	45	52	−7	27	
7	Wanneroo City	22	7	6	9	40	47	−7	27	
8	Shamrock Rovers	22	6	5	11	33	44	−11	23	
9	Kelmscott Roos	22	5	6	11	36	53	−17	21	
10	Curtin University	22	5	6	11	25	44	−19	21	
11	Dianella White Eagles	22	4	3	15	26	61	−35	15	
12	Canning City	22	4	2	16	33	73	−40	14	

Source: sportstg.com
Rules for classification: 1) points; 2) goal difference; 3) number of goals scored.
(P) Promoted

=== 2019 Women's Premier League ===
Women's Premier League
- Season: 2019
- Champions: Queen's Park

The 2019 Women's Premier League was played over 20 rounds as a quadruple round-robin. This was the last season in the Premier League format, before the introduction of the National Premier Leagues WA Women competition in 2020.

Pos	Team	Pld	W	D	L	GF	GA	GD	Pts	Qualification or relegation
1	Northern Redbacks	20	15	2	3	67	16	+51	47	Top Four Cup
2	Fremantle City	19	12	1	6	39	28	+11	37	Top Four Cup
3	Queen's Park FC (C, R)	18	11	1	6	42	21	+21	34	Top Four Cup; Relegated from new NPLWA structure for 2020
4	Balcatta	20	9	4	7	42	25	+17	31	Top Four Cup
5	Football West NTC U-19	19	5	2	12	48	51	−3	17	
6	Stirling Panthers (R)	18	0	0	18	3	100	−97	0	Relegated from new NPLWA structure for 2020

Source: sportstg.com
Rules for classification: 1) points; 2) goal difference; 3) number of goals scored.
(C) Champions; (R) Relegated

==== Top Four Cup ====
Semi-finals
1	Northern Redbacks	1
4	Balcatta	0
2	Fremantle City	1
3	Queen's Park	2

Grand Final
Northern Redbacks	1
Queen's Park	2

== 2019 State Cup ==
Western Australian soccer clubs competed in 2019 for the State Cup, known as the Belt Up State Cup for sponsorship reasons. Clubs entered from the National Premier Leagues WA, the two divisions of the State League, a limited number of teams from various divisions of the 2019 Amateur League, Metropolitan League and Masters League competitions, and from regional teams from the South West and Great Southern regions.

This knockout competition was won by Floreat Athena, their seventh title.

The competition also served as the Western Australian Preliminary rounds for the 2019 FFA Cup. In addition to the A-League club Perth Glory, the two finalists – Bayswater City and Floreat Athena – qualified for the final rounds, and entered at the Round of 32. All three clubs were eliminated in this round.
