= 2014 WA State Challenge Cup =

Football tournament season in Western Australia

2014 Cool Ridge Cup
WA State Challenge Cup

Tournament details
- Teams: 50

Final positions
- Champions: Bayswater City

Western Australian soccer clubs competed in 2014 for the Football West State Cup, known for sponsorship reasons as the Cool Ridge Cup. Clubs entered from the newly formed National Premier Leagues WA, the two divisions of the State League, as well as a limited number of teams from various divisions of the 2014 Sunday League competition. This knockout competition was won by Bayswater City, their second title.

The competition also served as Qualifying Rounds for the 2014 FFA Cup. In addition to the A-League club Perth Glory, the two finalists qualified for the final rounds of the 2014 FFA Cup, entering at the Round of 32.

== Preliminary round ==
A total of 39 Western Australian teams took part in this stage of the competition and 3 teams were given a Bye to the First Round. 24 clubs from the All Flags State League Division 1 and State League Division 2 and 15 clubs from various divisions of the 2014 Sunday League were admitted into the competition at this stage. Matches in this round were played on 29 March 2014.

Tie no	Home team (tier)	Score	Away team (tier)
1	Ashfield (3)	5–1	Hamersley Rovers (5)
2	Wanneroo City (3)	3–1	Canning City (3)
3	South Perth United (5)	1–2	Kingsley (5)
4	Queens Park (5)	0–4	Dianella White Eagles (3)
5	Kelmscott Roos (4)	5–7	Curtin University (4)
6	Shamrock Rovers Perth (3)	4–2	Morley-Windmills (3)
7	Quinns (4)	0–2	UWA-Nedlands (3)
8	Forrestfield United (4)	4–2	Balga (4)
9	Mandurah City (3)	4–0	BB United (5)

Tie no	Home team (tier)	Score	Away team (tier)
10	Joondalup City (4)	4–0	Ballajura (7)
11	Perth Royals (5)	4–2	Gosnells City (3)
12	Kwinana United (5)	1–10	Joondalup United (4)
13	Port Kennedy (6)	6–0	Ellenbrook United (4)
14	Rockingham City (4)	1–0	Gwelup Croatia (5)
15	Kalamunda United (6)	1–8	Fremantle Croatia (5)
16	Western Knights (3)	2–4	Bunbury Forum Force (3)
17	Southern Spirit (5)	2–3	Olympic Kingsway (4)
18	Melville City (4)	4–2	Whitfords City (5)

- Byes: North Perth United (5), Swan United (3) and Fremantle United (4).

== First round ==
A total of 32 teams took part in this stage of the competition. 11 of the 12 Clubs from the National Premier Leagues WA entered into the competition at this stage, with the exception of Perth Glory Youth who were not eligible. Matches in this round were played on 5 April 2014.

Tie no	Home team (tier)	Score	Away team (tier)
1	Joondalup United (4)	3–2	Bunbury Forum Force (3)
2	Kingsley (5)	2–6	Rockingham City (4)
3	Cockburn City (2)	4–0	Wanneroo City (3)
4	Dianella White Eagles (3)	1–3	Armadale (2)
5	Perth (2)	7–2	Port Kennedy (6)
6	ECU Joondalup (2)	3–0	Forrestfield United (4)
7	UWA-Nedlands (3)	1–2	Curtin University (4)
8	Bayswater City (2)	5–0	Ashfield (3)

Tie no	Home team (tier)	Score	Away team (tier)
9	Fremantle United (4)	4–2	Olympic Kingsway (4)
10	Joondalup City (4)	0–2	Stirling Lions (2)
11	Floreat Athena (2)	3–1	Perth Royals (5)
12	Fremantle Croatia (5)	1–4	Shamrock Rovers Perth (3)
13	Melville City (4)	0–5	Balcatta (2)
14	Swan United (3)	0–6	Sorrento (2)
15	Subiaco AFC (2)	6–2	Mandurah City (3)
16	North Perth United (5)	1–4	Inglewood United (2)

== Second round ==
A total of 16 teams took part in this stage of the competition. Matches in this round were played on 21 April 2014.

Tie no	Home team (tier)	Score	Away team (tier)
1	Cockburn City (2)	3–1	Perth (2)
2	Floreat Athena (2)	5–0	Sorrento (2)
3	ECU Joondalup (2)	5–2	Shamrock Rovers Perth (3)
4	Bayswater City (2)	3–1	Armadale (2)

Tie no	Home team (tier)	Score	Away team (tier)
5	Balcatta (2)	3–1	Joondalup United (4)
6	Inglewood United (2)	4–1	Fremantle United (4)
7	Rockingham City (4)	1–8	Stirling Lions (2)
8	Subiaco AFC (2)	3–0	Curtin University (4)

== Quarter finals ==
A total of 8 teams took part in this stage of the competition. Matches in this round were played on 10 May 2014.

Tie no	Home team (tier)	Score	Away team (tier)
1	ECU Joondalup (2)	3–1†	Balcatta (2)
2	Inglewood United (2)	2–2†	Bayswater City (2)
Bayswater City advance 5–4 on penalties.
3	Stirling Lions (2)	3–2†	Floreat Athena (2)
4	Subiaco AFC (2)	2–1	Cockburn City (2)

Notes:

- † = After Extra Time

== Semi finals ==
A total of 4 teams took part in this stage of the competition. Matches in this round were played on 2 June 2014. The two victorious teams in this round qualified for the 2014 FFA Cup Round of 32.

Tie no	Home team (tier)	Score	Away team (tier)
1	ECU Joondalup (2)	1–3	Stirling Lions (2)
2	Subiaco AFC (2)	0–4	Bayswater City (2)

== Final ==
The 2014 Cool Ridge Cup Final was held at Stirling Lions' home ground of Macedonia Park on 19 July 2014.

19 July 2014	Stirling Lions	0–2	Bayswater City	Macedonia Park
		Report	Burton 10'; Howarth 27'	Attendance: ~2,200; Referee: Adam Fielding
