= 2015 Football West season =

Football West Season 2015
- League: National Premier Leagues Western Australia
- Sport: Association football
- Duration: 2015

NPL WA League Season
- Premiers: Bayswater City

2015 State Cup
- Cup Winners: Sorrento

Football West seasons
- ← 2014 2016 →

The 2015 Football West season was the second season under the new competition format in Western Australia. The overall premier for the new structure qualified for the National Premier Leagues finals series, competing with the other state federation champions in a final knockout tournament to decide the National Premier Leagues Champion for 2015.

== Pre-season changes ==
| 2014 League | Promoted to league | Relegated from league |
|---|---|---|
| NPL WA | – | – |
| State League 1 | Joondalup United | Wanneroo City |
| State League 2 | – | – |
| Women's State League | Quinns | Cockburn City |

== League tables ==
=== 2015 National Premier Leagues WA ===
The 2015 National Premier Leagues WA season was played over 22 rounds. This year there was no Finals series, instead with Bayswater City – as the Premiers – competing in the 2015 National Premier Leagues Finals.

Bayswater City completed the league season undefeated, the first occurrence since Floreat Athena achieved the feat in 2007.

| Pos | Team | Pld | W | D | L | GF | GA | GD | Pts | Qualification or relegation |
|---|---|---|---|---|---|---|---|---|---|---|
| 1 | Bayswater City (C) | 22 | 19 | 3 | 0 | 64 | 21 | +43 | 60 | 2015 National Premier Leagues Finals |
| 2 | Perth SC | 22 | 16 | 2 | 4 | 50 | 23 | +27 | 50 | |
| 3 | Floreat Athena | 22 | 15 | 3 | 4 | 61 | 34 | +27 | 48 | |
| 4 | Sorrento | 22 | 12 | 3 | 7 | 41 | 31 | +10 | 39 | |
| 5 | Cockburn City | 22 | 9 | 3 | 10 | 41 | 50 | −9 | 30 | |
| 6 | Balcatta | 22 | 8 | 3 | 11 | 44 | 44 | 0 | 27 | |
| 7 | Inglewood United | 22 | 8 | 3 | 11 | 28 | 46 | −18 | 27 | |
| 8 | Stirling Lions | 22 | 8 | 2 | 12 | 42 | 55 | −13 | 26 | |
| 9 | Subiaco AFC | 22 | 6 | 2 | 14 | 27 | 36 | −9 | 20 | |
| 10 | ECU Joondalup | 22 | 5 | 4 | 13 | 37 | 55 | −18 | 19 | |
| 11 | Perth Glory Youth | 22 | 5 | 3 | 14 | 33 | 48 | −15 | 18 | |
| 12 | Armadale | 22 | 4 | 3 | 15 | 29 | 54 | −25 | 15 | |

Source: foxsportspulse.com
Rules for classification: 1) points; 2) goal difference; 3) number of goals scored.
(C) Champions

==== Top Scorers ====
| Rank | Player | Club | Goals |
|---|---|---|---|
| 1 | (Colombia) Gustavo Giron Marulanda | Bayswater City | 22 |
| 2 | (Northern Ireland) Rory Patterson | Cockburn City | 20 |
| 3 | (England) Lewis McMahon | Floreat Athena | 14 |
| 4 | (England) David Heagney | Bayswater City | 13 |
| 4 | (Mauritius) Ludovic Boi | Floreat Athena | 13 |
| 4 | (Australia) Tommy Amphlett | ECU Joondalup | 13 |
| 7 | (Wales) Mark Pritchard | Perth SC | 11 |

=== 2015 WA State League Division 1 ===
Football West State League Division 1
- Season: 2015
- Champions: Mandurah City
- Relegated: Morley-Windmills; Swan United
- Top goalscorer: –

The 2015 WA State League Division 1 Season is the second tier domestic football competition in Western Australia. The 12 teams play each other twice, for a total of 22 rounds. Mandurah City were Champions, but didn't meet all of the Football West eligibility criteria to be promoted to the 2016 NPL competition.

| Pos | Team | Pld | W | D | L | GF | GA | GD | Pts | Qualification or relegation |
|---|---|---|---|---|---|---|---|---|---|---|
| 1 | Mandurah City (C) | 22 | 16 | 4 | 2 | 68 | 27 | +41 | 52 | |
| 2 | Ashfield | 22 | 16 | 1 | 5 | 59 | 24 | +35 | 49 | |
| 3 | Joondalup United | 22 | 13 | 4 | 5 | 49 | 28 | +21 | 43 | |
| 4 | Shamrock Rovers | 22 | 12 | 6 | 4 | 59 | 28 | +31 | 42 | |
| 5 | Western Knights | 22 | 10 | 4 | 8 | 42 | 35 | +7 | 34 | |
| 6 | Dianella White Eagles | 22 | 12 | 3 | 7 | 49 | 38 | +11 | 39 | |
| 7 | South West Phoenix | 22 | 7 | 8 | 7 | 36 | 40 | −4 | 29 | |
| 8 | Gosnells City | 22 | 8 | 1 | 13 | 43 | 46 | −3 | 25 | |
| 9 | UWA-Nedlands | 22 | 8 | 1 | 13 | 43 | 67 | −24 | 25 | |
| 10 | Canning City | 22 | 5 | 2 | 15 | 36 | 57 | −21 | 17 | |
| 11 | Morley-Windmills (R) | 22 | 2 | 5 | 15 | 20 | 61 | −41 | 11 | Qualification to the 2015 relegation play-off |
| 12 | Swan United (R) | 22 | 2 | 3 | 17 | 24 | 77 | −53 | 9 | Relegation to the 2016 State League Division 2 |

Source: foxsportspulse.com
Rules for classification: 1) points; 2) goal difference; 3) number of goals scored.
(C) Champions; (R) Relegated

==== Promotion/relegation play-off ====
29 September 2015

| Rockingham City | 2–1 | Morley-Windmills SC |
|---|---|---|
| | Report |

2 October 2015

| Morley-Windmills SC | 2–2 | Rockingham City (Promoted) |

=== 2015 WA State League Division 2 ===
Football West State League Division 2
- Season: 2015
- Champions: Forrestfield United
- Promoted: Forrestfield United; Rockingham City
- Top goalscorer: –

The 2015 WA State League Division 2 Season is the third tier domestic football competition in Western Australia. The 12 teams play each other twice, for a total of 22 rounds. The top team at the end of the year is promoted to the 2016 WA State League Division 1.

| Pos | Team | Pld | W | D | L | GF | GA | GD | Pts | Qualification or relegation |
|---|---|---|---|---|---|---|---|---|---|---|
| 1 | Forrestfield United (C, P) | 22 | 19 | 1 | 2 | 89 | 16 | +73 | 58 | Promotion to the 2016 State League Division 1 |
| 2 | Rockingham City (P) | 22 | 17 | 3 | 2 | 61 | 15 | +46 | 54 | Qualification to the 2015 promotion play-off |
| 3 | Fremantle City | 22 | 13 | 2 | 7 | 67 | 25 | +42 | 41 | |
| 4 | Wanneroo City | 22 | 10 | 5 | 7 | 55 | 38 | +17 | 35 | |
| 5 | Balga | 22 | 11 | 2 | 9 | 46 | 58 | −12 | 35 | |
| 6 | Olympic Kingsway | 22 | 9 | 7 | 6 | 47 | 42 | +5 | 34 | |
| 7 | Joondalup City | 22 | 9 | 4 | 9 | 44 | 33 | +11 | 31 | |
| 8 | Quinns | 22 | 8 | 3 | 11 | 40 | 59 | −19 | 27 | |
| 9 | Melville City | 22 | 8 | 2 | 12 | 40 | 47 | −7 | 26 | |
| 10 | Curtin University | 22 | 6 | 5 | 11 | 31 | 46 | −15 | 23 | |
| 11 | Ellenbrook United | 22 | 4 | 1 | 17 | 25 | 62 | −37 | 13 | |
| 12 | Kelmscott Roos | 22 | 0 | 1 | 21 | 18 | 122 | −104 | 1 | |

Source: foxsportspulse.com
Rules for classification: 1) points; 2) goal difference; 3) number of goals scored.
(C) Champions; (P) Promoted

=== 2015 Women's State League Premier Division ===
(Western Australia) Football West Women's State League
- Season: 2015
- Champions: Northern Redbacks (13th title)
- Relegated: UWA-Nedlands
- Top goalscorer: –

The highest tier domestic football competition in Western Australia is known as the BankWest Women's State League Premier Division for sponsorship reasons. The 8 teams play each other three times, for a total of 21 rounds, and with a promotion/relegation system for the bottom team with the State League Division 1. Beckenham Angels won the Women's State Cup.

| Pos | Team | Pld | W | D | L | GF | GA | GD | Pts | Qualification or relegation |
|---|---|---|---|---|---|---|---|---|---|---|
| 1 | Northern Redbacks (C) | 21 | 17 | 2 | 2 | 100 | 21 | +79 | 53 | |
| 2 | Beckenham Angels | 21 | 17 | 1 | 3 | 100 | 18 | +82 | 52 | |
| 3 | Queen's Park | 21 | 14 | 2 | 5 | 53 | 24 | +29 | 44 | |
| 4 | Football West NTC U-19 | 21 | 10 | 4 | 7 | 48 | 38 | +10 | 34 | |
| 5 | Melville City | 21 | 8 | 4 | 9 | 43 | 36 | +7 | 28 | |
| 6 | Quinns | 21 | 5 | 1 | 15 | 32 | 98 | −66 | 16 | |
| 7 | Balcatta | 21 | 2 | 5 | 14 | 29 | 74 | −45 | 11 | |
| 8 | UWA-Nedlands (R) | 21 | 1 | 1 | 19 | 7 | 103 | −96 | 4 | Relegation to the 2016 State League Division 1 |

Source: foxsportspulse.com
Rules for classification: 1) points; 2) goal difference; 3) number of goals scored.
(C) Champions; (R) Relegated

== 2015 Cool Ridge Cup ==
Western Australian soccer clubs competed in 2015 for the Football West State Cup, known that year as the Cool Ridge Cup for sponsorship reasons. Clubs entered from the National Premier Leagues WA, the two divisions of the State League, a limited number of teams from various divisions of the 2015 Sunday League competition, and from regional teams invited from the South West, Goldfields, Great Southern and Midwest regions.

This knockout competition was won by Sorrento, their 3rd title.

The competition also served as the Western Australian Preliminary Rounds for the 2015 FFA Cup. In addition to the A-League club Perth Glory, the two finalists – Perth SC and Sorrento FC – qualified for the final rounds of the 2015 FFA Cup, entering at the Round of 32, where they were both eliminated.
