= 2026 Football West season =

Football West
- Season: 2026
- Dates: February – 19 September 2026
- Champions: Bayswater City
- Premiers: Bayswater City
- State Cup: Fremantle City

The 2026 Football West season was the 126th season of Soccer in Western Australia and the 13th season since the establishment of the National Premier Leagues WA (NPL).

== Pre-season changes ==
2025 League	Promoted to league	Relegated from league
NPL WA	Dianella White Eagles	Floreat Athena
State League 1	Cockburn City; Quinns FC	Gosnells City; Kalamunda City FC
State League 2	Morley-Windmills; North Beach SC	Wanneroo City; Swan United
NPL Women	Sorrento FC	Murdoch University Melville

== League Tables ==
=== 2026 National Premier Leagues WA ===
The competition was held as a double round-robin played over 22 rounds, followed by an end of season Finals competition. Bayswater City were both the Premiers and Champions, repeating their 'double' from the 2025 season.

Pos	Team	Pld	W	D	L	GF	GA	GD	Pts	Qualification or relegation
1	Bayswater City (C, Q)	22	14	5	3	60	27	+33	47	Qualification to Australian Championship and Finals series
2	Olympic Kingsway	22	12	5	5	44	29	+15	41	Qualification to Finals series
3	Perth RedStar	22	12	5	5	35	29	+6	41	Qualification to Finals series
4	Perth Azzurri	22	10	8	4	53	41	+12	38	Qualification to Finals series
5	Fremantle City	22	9	8	5	44	34	+10	35	
6	Stirling Macedonia	22	9	3	10	40	38	+2	30	
7	Western Knights	22	6	7	9	38	40	−2	25	
8	Sorrento FC	22	7	3	12	22	42	−20	24	
9	Dianella White Eagles	22	6	5	11	32	43	−11	23	
10	Perth Glory Youth	22	5	6	11	41	45	−4	21	
11	Armadale SC (O)	22	5	6	11	40	56	−16	21	Qualification for the Relegation play-off
12	Balcatta FC (R)	22	4	5	13	29	54	−25	17	Relegation to the 2027 State League 1

Source: squadi
Rules for classification: 1) points; 2) goal difference; 3) number of goals scored.
(C) Champions; (O) Play-off winners; (Q) Qualified for the phase indicated; (R) Relegated

==== Finals ====
Semi-finals
1	Bayswater City	5
2	Olympic Kingsway	3
3	Perth RedStar	1
4	Perth Azzurri	3

Preliminary Final
Olympic Kingsway	0
Perth Azzurri	2

Grand Final
Bayswater City	2
Perth Azzurri	0

=== 2026 WA State League 1 ===
Pos	Team	Pld	W	D	L	GF	GA	GD	Pts	Qualification or relegation
1	Floreat Athena (P)	22	16	4	2	57	24	+33	52	Promotion to the 2027 NPL WA
2	UWA-Nedlands	22	15	2	5	48	25	+23	47	Promotion/relegation play-offs
3	Mandurah City	22	11	3	8	47	39	+8	36	Promotion/relegation play-offs
4	Joondalup City	22	11	3	8	36	32	+4	36	Promotion/relegation play-offs
5	Quinns FC	22	11	3	8	34	47	−13	36	
6	Inglewood United	22	9	6	7	26	24	+2	33	
7	Kingsley-Westside	22	9	2	11	35	36	−1	29	
8	Gwelup Croatia	22	6	7	9	36	47	−11	25	
9	Cockburn City	22	6	5	11	34	39	−5	23	
10	Murdoch University Melville	22	5	7	10	38	46	−8	22	
11	Subiaco AFC (R)	22	6	2	14	36	46	−10	20	Promotion/relegation play-offs
12	Curtin University (R)	22	3	4	15	19	41	−22	13	Relegation to the 2027 State League 2

Source: Squadi
Rules for classification: 1) points; 2) goal difference; 3) number of goals scored.
(P) Promoted; (R) Relegated

NPL WA/State League 1 Relegation/Promotion Playoff

Semi-finals
NPL 11	Armadale SC	2	1	3
SL1 4	Joondalup City	1	0	1
SL1 2	UWA-Nedlands	1	0	1
SL1 3	Mandurah City	0	0	0

Final
Armadale SC	3
UWA-Nedlands	0

=== 2026 WA State League 2 ===
Pos	Team	Pld	W	D	L	GF	GA	GD	Pts	Qualification or relegation
1	Carramar Shamrock Rovers (P)	22	13	7	2	44	21	+23	46	Promotion to the 2026 State League 1
2	Wembley Downs	22	13	4	5	49	25	+24	43	Promotion/relegation play-offs
3	Rockingham City	22	13	2	7	34	23	+11	41	Promotion/relegation play-offs
4	Balga SC (P)	22	11	6	5	44	20	+24	39	Promotion/relegation play-offs
5	Kalamunda City	22	11	3	8	37	32	+5	36	
6	Forrestfield United	22	11	3	8	36	38	−2	36	
7	East Perth FC	22	10	3	9	44	34	+10	33	
8	Ashfield SC	22	8	4	10	25	29	−4	28	
9	Morley-Windmills	22	8	3	11	38	43	−5	27	
10	Canning City	22	5	3	14	30	45	−15	18	
11	North Beach (R)	22	4	2	16	19	60	−41	14	Promotion/relegation play-offs
12	Gosnells City (R)	22	3	4	15	15	45	−30	13	Relegation to the 2027 Amateur Premier Division

Source: Squadi
Rules for classification: 1) points; 2) goal difference; 3) number of goals scored.
(P) Promoted; (R) Relegated

State League 1/State League 2 Relegation/Promotion Playoff

Semi-finals
SL1 11	Subiaco AFC	1	4	5
SL2 4	Balga SC	3	3	6
SL2 2	Wembley Downs	0	1	1
SL2 3	Rockingham City	1	0	1

Final
Balga SC	3
Rockingham City	0

State League 2/Amateur Premier Division Relegation/Promotion Playoff

Playoff
SL2 12	North Beach SC	0
AM1	Noranda Emerald (P)	1

== 2026 State Cup ==
=== Men's ===
Western Australian soccer clubs competed in the Football West State Cup competition, which initially involved teams from the Amateur League and Metropolitan League competitions, and teams from the South West Soccer Association. In the third round, teams from the two divisions of the State League entered, and in the fourth round teams from the National Premier Leagues WA entered.

The competition also served as the Western Australian Preliminary rounds for the 2026 Australia Cup. The two finalists – Bayswater City and Fremantle City – qualified for the final rounds, entering at the Round of 32.

The final was played on 29 August, and won by Fremantle City 3–2, their ninth title.

=== Women's ===
Balcatta Etna won the Women's State Cup final, beating Perth Azzurri 3–0, and winning their first title.

== 2026 NPL Women ==
The 2026 NPL WA Women was the seventh season in the National Premier Leagues WA Women format. It was played over 21 rounds as a triple round-robin, followed by an end of season Top 4 Cup competition.

Pos	Team	Pld	W	D	L	GF	GA	GD	Pts	Qualification or relegation
1	Perth Azzurri	21	14	4	3	42	13	+29	46	NPLWA-W Top Four Cup
2	Balcatta	21	13	6	2	49	18	+31	45	NPLWA-W Top Four Cup
3	Fremantle City (C)	21	13	4	4	45	20	+25	43	NPLWA-W Top Four Cup
4	Perth RedStar	21	7	6	8	32	29	+3	27	NPLWA-W Top Four Cup
5	Subiaco AFC	21	8	2	11	32	42	−10	26	
6	Football West NTC U-19	21	6	6	9	36	39	−3	24	
7	Sorrento FC	21	3	4	14	18	50	−32	13	
8	UWA Nedlands (R)	21	2	4	15	9	52	−43	10	Relegation to the 2027 State League

Source: Squadi
Rules for classification: 1) points; 2) goal difference; 3) number of goals scored.
(C) Champions; (R) Relegated

=== Top four cup ===
Qualifying finals
1	Perth Azzurri	0
2	Balcatta	1
3	Fremantle City	2
4	Perth RedStar	1

Preliminary Final
Perth Azzurri	0
Fremantle City	5

Final
Balcatta	0
Fremantle City	1
