= 2016 Football West season =

Football West Season 2016
- League: National Premier Leagues Western Australia
- Sport: Association football
- Duration: 2016

NPL WA League Season
- Champions: Perth
- Premiers: Perth

Cool Ridge Cup
- Cup Winners: Floreat Athena

Football West seasons
- ← 2015 2017 →

The 2016 Football West season was the 116th season of competitive association football in Western Australia and the third season since the establishment of the National Premier Leagues WA (NPL).

The overall premier for the new structure – Perth – qualified for the National Premier Leagues finals series, competing with the other Federation champions in a final knockout tournament to decide the National Premier Leagues Champion for 2016.

== Pre-season changes ==
2015 League	Promoted to league	Relegated from league
NPL WA	–	–
State League 1	Forrestfield United; Rockingham City	Morley-Windmills; Swan United
State League 2	–	–
Women's State League	Fremantle City	UWA-Nedlands

== League tables ==
=== 2016 National Premier Leagues WA ===
The 2016 National Premier Leagues WA season was played over 22 rounds commencing 19 March 2016, followed by the return of a Top 4 Finals series. Despite the flagged return of a promotion/relegation system for the bottom team, it was determined after the season ended that no State League Division One club met all the criteria for promotion, and that the teams in the 2017 season would remain unchanged. This decision was changed 3 weeks later, with Football West stating that both Joondalup United and Mandurah City would be promoted, and their overall promotion criteria would be reviewed.

Pos	Team	Pld	W	D	L	GF	GA	GD	Pts	Qualification or relegation
1	Perth SC (C)	22	13	4	5	39	23	+16	43	2016 National Premier Leagues Finals
2	Inglewood United	22	13	3	6	44	32	+12	42	2016 Western Australia Finals
3	ECU Joondalup	22	13	2	7	38	29	+9	41	2016 Western Australia Finals
4	Floreat Athena	22	11	5	6	50	32	+18	38	2016 Western Australia Finals
5	Bayswater City	22	12	2	8	43	31	+12	38	
6	Sorrento	22	11	5	6	30	28	+2	38	
7	Stirling Lions	22	11	1	10	51	32	+19	34	
8	Balcatta	22	8	1	13	37	50	−13	25	
9	Cockburn City	22	5	7	10	37	47	−10	22	
10	Perth Glory Youth	22	6	3	13	23	40	−17	21	
11	Armadale	22	6	1	15	26	41	−15	19	
12	Subiaco AFC	22	5	2	15	20	53	−33	17	

Source: foxsportspulse.com
Rules for classification: 1) points; 2) goal difference; 3) number of goals scored.
(C) Champions

==== Finals ====
Semi-finals
1	Perth	1 (5)
2	Inglewood United	1 (4)
3	ECU Joondalup	5
4	Floreat Athena	4

Preliminary Final
2	Inglewood United	3 (6)
3	ECU Joondalup	3 (5)

Grand Final
1	Perth	1
2	Inglewood United	0

=== 2016 WA State League Division 1 ===
Football West State League Division 1
- Season: 2016
- Champions: Joondalup United
- Top goalscorer: –

The 2016 WA State League Division 1 Season was the second tier domestic football competition in Western Australia. It was decided after the season ended that no club met all the criteria for promotion to the NPL for the following season, but that decision was reversed three weeks later.

Pos	Team	Pld	W	D	L	GF	GA	GD	Pts	Qualification or relegation
1	Joondalup United (C, P)	22	16	2	4	63	27	+36	50	Promotion to the 2017 NPL Western Australia
2	Mandurah City (P)	22	14	6	2	51	24	+27	48	Promotion to the 2017 NPL Western Australia
3	Forrestfield United	22	13	0	9	64	39	+25	39	
4	Western Knights	22	11	4	7	47	35	+12	37	
5	Ashfield	22	10	2	10	39	31	+8	32	
6	Canning City	22	9	5	8	33	30	+3	32	
7	Rockingham City	22	9	5	8	32	31	+1	32	
8	UWA-Nedlands	22	9	5	8	46	57	−11	32	
9	South West Phoenix	22	5	9	8	31	44	−13	24	
10	Gosnells City	22	6	4	12	28	51	−23	22	
11	Dianella White Eagles	22	4	2	16	37	65	−28	14	Qualification to the 2016 relegation play-offs
12	Shamrock Rovers (R)	22	3	2	17	27	64	−37	11	Relegation to the 2017 State League Division 2

Source: socceraust.co.uk
Rules for classification: 1) points; 2) goal difference; 3) number of goals scored.
(C) Champions; (P) Promoted; (R) Relegated

==== Promotion/relegation play-off ====
20 September 2016

Dianella White Eagles	3–0	Joondalup City

Dianella Reserve
24 September 2016

Joondalup City	2–1	Dianella White Eagles

Iluka Sports Complex

Dianella wins 4–2 on aggregate, and stays in Division 1 in 2017.

=== 2016 WA State League Division 2 ===
Football West State League Division 2
- Season: 2016

The 2016 WA State League Division 2 Season was the third tier domestic football competition in Western Australia. The top team at the end of the year is promoted to the 2017 WA State League Division 1, with the second team qualifying to a promotion/relegation playoff.

Pos	Team	Pld	W	D	L	GF	GA	GD	Pts	Qualification or relegation
1	Fremantle City (C, P)	22	17	4	1	59	19	+40	55	Promotion to the 2017 State League Division 1
2	Joondalup City	22	15	2	5	51	33	+18	47	Qualification to the 2016 promotion play-offs
3	Balga	22	14	3	5	49	28	+21	45	
4	Quinns	22	11	2	9	45	37	+8	35	
5	Melville City	22	8	6	8	38	38	0	30	
6	Swan United	22	8	6	8	33	41	−8	30	
7	Morley-Windmills	22	9	1	12	44	43	+1	28	
8	Olympic Kingsway	22	8	3	11	35	37	−2	27	
9	Kelmscott Roos	22	8	2	12	34	36	−2	26	
10	Curtin University	22	7	5	10	30	41	−11	26	
11	Wanneroo City	22	7	3	12	31	37	−6	24	
12	Ellenbrook United (R)	22	1	1	20	11	70	−59	4	Relegation to the 2017 Amateur League Premier Division

Source: socceraust.co.uk
Rules for classification: 1) points; 2) goal difference; 3) number of goals scored.
(C) Champions; (P) Promoted; (R) Relegated

=== 2016 Women's State League Premier Division ===
(Western Australia) Football West Women's State League
- Season: 2016
- Champions: Northern Redbacks
- Relegated: Quinns

The highest tier domestic football competition in Western Australia is known as the BankWest Women's State League Premier Division for sponsorship reasons. The 8 teams play each other three times, for a total of 21 rounds, and with a promotion/relegation system for the bottom team with the State League Division 1.

Pos	Team	Pld	W	D	L	GF	GA	GD	Pts	Qualification or relegation
1	Northern Redbacks (C)	21	17	2	2	85	22	+63	53	
2	Beckenham Angels	21	15	0	6	80	39	+41	45	
3	Queen's Park	21	14	2	5	62	18	+44	44	
4	Football West NTC U-19	21	12	2	7	52	41	+11	38	
5	Melville City	21	10	2	9	40	32	+8	32	
6	Balcatta	21	5	5	11	28	50	−22	20	
7	East Fremantle	21	2	3	16	17	71	−54	9	
8	Quinns (R)	21	1	0	20	20	111	−91	3	Relegation to the 2017 State League Division 1

Source: foxsportspulse.com
Rules for classification: 1) points; 2) goal difference; 3) number of goals scored.
(C) Champions; (R) Relegated

== 2016 Cool Ridge Cup ==
Western Australian soccer clubs competed in 2016 for the Football West State Cup, known that year as the Cool Ridge Cup for sponsorship reasons. Clubs entered from the National Premier Leagues WA, the two divisions of the State League, a limited number of teams from various divisions of the 2016 Sunday League competition, and from regional teams invited from the South West, Goldfields, Great Southern and Midwest regions.

This knockout competition was won by Floreat Athena, their 6th title.

The competition also served as the Western Australian Preliminary rounds for the 2016 FFA Cup. In addition to the A-League club Perth Glory, the two finalists – Cockburn City and Floreat Athena – qualified for the final rounds of the 2016 FFA Cup, entering at the Round of 32.
