= 2014 Football West season =

Sports season in Western Australia

Football West Season 2014
- League: National Premier Leagues Western Australia
- Sport: Association football
- Duration: 2014

NPL WA League Season
- Champions: Bayswater City
- Premiers: Bayswater City

2014 Cool Ridge Cup
- Cup Winners: Bayswater City

Football West seasons
- ← 2013 2015 →

The 2014 Football West season was the first season under the new competition format in Western Australia. The overall premier for the new structure qualified for the National Premier Leagues finals series, competing with the other state federation champions in a final knockout tournament to decide the National Premier Leagues Champion for 2014.

== Pre-season changes ==
2013 League	Promoted to league in 2014	Relegated from league from 2013
State League Premier Division (new NPL WA)	Subiaco; Perth Glory Youth	Bunbury Forum Force; Football West NTC
State League 1st Division	–	Rockingham City
State League 2nd Division	Balga; Curtin University; Ellenbrook United; Joondalup United; Kelmscott Roos	Maddington White City

== League tables ==
=== 2014 National Premier Leagues WA ===
The 2014 National Premier Leagues season was the second season of the new national structure, and the first season with Western Australia participating. The highest division in WA replaced the previous Football West Premier League competition, which has been run in one form or another for over a century. The overall premier for the new structure qualifies for the National Premier Leagues finals series, competing with the other state federation champions in a final knockout tournament to decide the National Premier Leagues Champion for 2014.

It was played over 22 rounds as a full double round robin from March to August 2014.

A relegation system for the lowest team to the State League Division 1 was introduced after the 2015 season, and was subject to whether the top team from the State League Division 1 met certain NPL Eligibility Criteria.

Pos	Team	Pld	W	D	L	GF	GA	GD	Pts	Qualification or relegation
1	Bayswater City (C)	22	16	3	3	53	20	+33	51	2014 National Premier Leagues Finals
2	Perth SC	22	15	4	3	51	22	+29	49	2014 Western Australia Finals
3	Balcatta	22	14	1	7	47	25	+22	43	2014 Western Australia Finals
4	Sorrento	22	12	5	5	48	39	+9	41	2014 Western Australia Finals
5	Stirling Lions	22	11	5	6	41	28	+13	38	
6	Cockburn City	22	10	5	7	49	41	+8	35	
7	Floreat Athena	22	10	1	11	47	46	+1	31	
8	ECU Joondalup	22	9	3	10	39	37	+2	30	
9	Inglewood United	22	6	4	12	41	43	−2	22	
10	Perth Glory Youth	22	4	3	15	36	64	−28	15	
11	Subiaco AFC	22	4	2	16	26	55	−29	14	
12	Armadale	22	1	4	17	16	64	−48	7	

Source: foxsportspulse.com
Rules for classification: 1) points; 2) goal difference; 3) number of goals scored.
(C) Champions

==== Finals ====
Semi-finals
1	Bayswater City	0
2	Perth SC	5
3	Balcatta	3
4	Sorrento	1

Preliminary Final
1	Bayswater City	3
3	Balcatta	2

Grand Final
1	Bayswater City	1
2	Perth SC	0

=== 2014 WA State League Division 1 ===
Football West State League Division 1
- Season: 2014
- Champions: Shamrock Rovers Perth
- Relegated: Wanneroo City
- Matches: –
- Top goalscorer: –
- Biggest home win: –
- Biggest away win: –
- Highest scoring: –

The 2014 WA State League Division 1 season, known as the All Flags State League Division 1 for sponsorship reasons, was the second level domestic football competition in Western Australia.

Pos	Team	Pld	W	D	L	GF	GA	GD	Pts	Qualification or relegation
1	Shamrock Rovers (C)	22	18	1	3	59	30	+29	55	
2	Ashfield	22	16	4	2	76	21	+55	52	
3	Bunbury Forum Force	22	14	3	5	49	24	+25	45	
4	Western Knights	22	11	5	6	54	30	+24	38	
5	Morley-Windmills	22	9	3	10	36	45	−9	30	
6	Canning City	22	8	5	9	38	34	+4	29	
7	Swan United	22	8	3	11	29	42	−13	27	
8	UWA-Nedlands	22	7	4	11	38	54	−16	25	
9	Mandurah City	22	7	3	12	24	42	−18	24	
10	Gosnells City	22	7	3	12	20	41	−21	24	
11	Dianella White Eagles	22	4	3	15	22	48	−26	15	
12	Wanneroo City (R)	22	2	5	15	24	68	−44	11	Relegated to the 2015 State League Division 2

Source: foxsportspulse.com
Rules for classification: 1) points; 2) goal difference; 3) number of goals scored.
(C) Champions; (R) Relegated

=== 2014 WA State League Division 2 ===
Football West State League Division 2
- Season: 2014
- Champions: Joondalup United
- Promoted: Joondalup United
- Matches: –
- Top goalscorer: – Philip Crozier (31)
- Biggest home win: –
- Biggest away win: –
- Highest scoring: –

The 2014 WA State League Division 2 season, known as the All Flags State League Division 2 for sponsorship reasons, was the third level domestic football competition in Western Australia. Joondalup United finished the season undefeated.

Pos	Team	Pld	W	D	L	GF	GA	GD	Pts	Qualification or relegation
1	Joondalup United (P)	22	18	4	0	81	20	+61	58	Promoted to the 2015 State League Division 1
2	Rockingham City	22	13	6	3	53	34	+19	45	
3	Forrestfield United	22	11	5	6	50	26	+24	38	
4	Curtin University	22	11	5	6	57	38	+19	38	
5	Melville City	22	12	2	8	62	52	+10	38	
6	Fremantle United	22	10	6	6	66	40	+26	36	
7	Joondalup City	22	11	3	8	48	34	+14	36	
8	Olympic Kingsway	22	7	3	12	42	44	−2	24	
9	Quinns	22	7	2	13	34	52	−18	23	
10	Balga	22	6	1	15	37	79	−42	19	
11	Ellenbrook United	22	4	1	17	31	84	−53	13	
12	Kelmscott Roos	22	2	2	18	24	82	−58	8	

Source: foxsportspulse.com
Rules for classification: 1) points; 2) goal difference; 3) number of goals scored.
(P) Promoted

=== 2014 Women's State League Premier Division ===
(Western Australia) Football West Women's State League
- Season: 2014
- Champions: Queen's Park (3rd title)
- Top goalscorer: –

The highest tier domestic football competition in Western Australia is known as the BankWest Women's State League Premier Division for sponsorship reasons. The 8 teams play each other three times, for a total of 21 rounds, and with a promotion/relegation system for the bottom team with the State League Division 1. Northern Redbacks won the Women's State Cup.

Pos	Team	Pld	W	D	L	GF	GA	GD	Pts	Qualification or relegation
1	Queen's Park (C)	21	17	1	3	75	22	+53	52	
2	Northern Redbacks	21	16	3	2	78	20	+58	51	
3	Beckenham Angels	21	15	2	4	99	22	+77	47	
4	Football West NTC U-19	21	10	1	10	36	41	−5	31	
5	Melville City	21	7	2	12	33	48	−15	23	
6	Balcatta	21	5	1	15	42	61	−19	16	
7	UWA-Nedlands	21	4	2	15	23	61	−38	14	
8	Cockburn City (R)	21	4	0	17	24	135	−111	12	Relegation to the 2015 State League Division 1

Source: foxsportspulse.com
Rules for classification: 1) points; 2) goal difference; 3) number of goals scored.
(C) Champions; (R) Relegated

== 2014 Cool Ridge Cup ==
Western Australian soccer clubs competed in 2014 for the Football West State Cup, known that year as the Cool Ridge Cup for sponsorship reasons. Clubs entered from the newly formed National Premier Leagues WA, the two divisions of the State League, as well as a limited number of teams from various divisions of the 2014 Sunday League competition.

This knockout competition was won by Bayswater City, their second title.

The competition also served as Qualifying rounds for the 2014 FFA Cup. In addition to the A-League club Perth Glory, the two finalists – Bayswater City and Stirling Lions – qualified for the final rounds of the 2014 FFA Cup, entering at the Round of 32.
