= 2009 WA State Premier League =

Football West State League 2009
- League: (Western Australia) Football West Premier League
- Sport: Association football
- Duration: 2009
- Number of teams: 12

Football West State League Season
- Champions: Perth
- Premiers: Western Knights

Soccer Pools WA State Cup
- Cup Winners: Floreat Athena

Football West State League seasons
- ← 2008 2010 →

The Football WA 2009 season was the 113th year of the football in Western Australia before the new banner of National Premier Leagues in 2014. The competition consisted of 12 teams, each playing a total of 22 games in the season with the premier team being Western Knights, marking their third premiership of the competition. The team to be relegated would be Canning City.

== Pre-season changes ==
2008 League	Promoted to league	Relegated from league
Premier League	Canning City	Fremantle Spirit

== Table ==
Pos	Team	Pld	W	D	L	GF	GA	GD	Pts	Qualification or relegation
1	Western Knights	22	16	2	4	45	22	+23	50	
2	Perth SC (C)	22	14	3	5	54	29	+25	45	
3	Floreat Athena	22	11	4	7	44	38	+6	37	
4	Mandurah City	22	9	5	8	36	32	+4	32	
5	Stirling Lions	22	9	3	10	39	45	−6	30	
6	Sorrento	22	8	5	9	37	38	−1	29	
7	Inglewood United	22	8	5	9	33	37	−4	29	
8	ECU Joondalup	22	9	1	12	40	42	−2	28	
9	Swan United	22	8	4	10	31	45	−14	28	
10	Armadale	22	7	4	11	38	49	−11	25	
11	Cockburn City	22	7	3	12	34	41	−7	24	
12	Canning City (R)	22	5	3	14	39	52	−13	18	Relegation to 2010 State League Division 1

Rules for classification: 1) points; 2) goal difference; 3) number of goals scored.
(C) Champions; (R) Relegated

=== Finals ===
Qualifying Finals
2	Perth	2
3	Floreat Athena	1
4	Mandurah City	1
5	Stirling Lions	0

Semi-finals
1	Western Knights	2
2	Perth	3
3	Floreat Athena	2
4	Mandurah City	1

Preliminary Final
1	Western Knights	2
3	Floreat Athena	1

Grand Final
2	Perth	2
1	Western Knights	0
