= 2012 WA State League Premier Division =

All Flags State League Premier Division 2012
- League: (Western Australia) Football West Premier League
- Sport: Association football
- Duration: 2012
- Number of teams: 12

Football West State League Season
- Champions: Sorrento
- Premiers: Bayswater City

State League Cup 2012
- Cup Winners: Sorrento

Football West State League seasons
- ← 2011 2013 →

The 2012 season of the State League Premier Division started on 24 March between eleven clubs and the National Training Squad (NTC). The Season ended on 6 October with the Championship decider. The NTC did not play for competition points.

Bayswater City were the Premiers – their first title – and Sorrento were Champions.

== Pre-season changes ==
2011 League	Promoted to league	Relegated from league
Premier Division	Bunbury Forum Force	Cockburn City; Mandurah City

== League table ==
Pos	Team	Pld	W	D	L	GF	GA	GD	Pts	Qualification or relegation
1	Bayswater City	22	15	3	4	67	29	+38	48	
2	Floreat Athena	22	13	5	4	64	34	+30	44	
3	Sorrento (C)	22	14	2	6	58	37	+21	44	
4	Inglewood United	22	13	4	5	45	30	+15	43	
5	Perth SC	22	12	4	6	57	33	+24	40	
6	Balcatta	22	11	4	7	54	40	+14	37	
7	Stirling Lions	22	8	6	8	40	39	+1	30	
8	ECU Joondalup	22	8	3	11	44	51	−7	27	
9	Bunbury Forum Force	22	6	3	13	26	51	−25	21	
10	Armadale	22	6	2	14	27	47	−20	20	
11	Western Knights (R)	22	5	2	15	37	73	−36	17	Relegation to 2013 State League Division 1
12	Football West NTC	22	1	2	19	20	75	−55	0	N.T.C. receive no points and cannot be relegated.

Source: foxsportspulse.com
Rules for classification: 1) points; 2) goal difference; 3) number of goals scored.
(C) Champions; (R) Relegated

== Finals ==
Qualifying Finals
2	Floreat Athena	3
3	Sorrento	1
4	Inglewood United	1
5	Perth	2

Semi-finals
1	Bayswater City	1
2	Floreat Athena	3
3	Sorrento	3
5	Perth	1

Preliminary Final
1	Bayswater City	1
3	Sorrento	2

Grand Final
2	Floreat Athena	3
3	Sorrento	4
