= 2025 Football West season =

Football West
- Season: 2025
- Dates: 14 March – 23 August 2025
- Champions: Bayswater City
- Premiers: Bayswater City

The 2025 Football West season was the 125th season of Soccer in Western Australia and the 12th season since the establishment of the National Premier Leagues WA (NPL).

== Pre-season changes ==
| 2024 League | Promoted to league | Relegated from league | Withdrew |
|---|---|---|---|
| NPL WA | Sorrento FC | Inglewood United | – |
| State League 1 | Curtin University FC; Joondalup City FC; Kalamunda City FC | Rockingham City; Cockburn City | Joondalup United |
| State League 2 | Wembley Downs SC | – | – |
| NPL Women | – | – | |

== League Tables ==
=== 2025 National Premier Leagues WA ===
The competition was held as a double round-robin played over 22 rounds, followed by an end of season Finals competition.

| Pos | Team | Pld | W | D | L | GF | GA | GD | Pts | Qualification or relegation |
|---|---|---|---|---|---|---|---|---|---|---|
| 1 | Bayswater City (C, Q) | 22 | 16 | 4 | 2 | 53 | 16 | +37 | 52 | Qualification to Australian Championship and Finals series |
| 2 | Olympic Kingsway | 22 | 16 | 3 | 3 | 53 | 22 | +31 | 51 | Qualification to Finals series |
| 3 | Perth RedStar | 22 | 13 | 5 | 4 | 33 | 23 | +10 | 44 | Qualification to Finals series |
| 4 | Perth Glory Youth | 22 | 12 | 4 | 6 | 52 | 30 | +22 | 40 | Qualification to Finals series |
| 5 | Stirling Macedonia | 22 | 10 | 5 | 7 | 50 | 38 | +12 | 35 | |
| 6 | Perth SC | 22 | 8 | 6 | 8 | 41 | 43 | −2 | 30 | |
| 7 | Western Knights | 22 | 7 | 5 | 10 | 34 | 43 | −9 | 26 | |
| 8 | Armadale SC | 22 | 6 | 5 | 11 | 34 | 51 | −17 | 23 | |
| 9 | Sorrento FC | 22 | 6 | 4 | 12 | 27 | 38 | −11 | 22 | |
| 10 | Balcatta FC | 22 | 5 | 5 | 12 | 22 | 45 | −23 | 20 | |
| 11 | Fremantle City (O) | 22 | 5 | 4 | 13 | 26 | 48 | −22 | 19 | Qualification for the Relegation play-off |
| 12 | Floreat Athena (R) | 22 | 0 | 6 | 16 | 23 | 51 | −28 | 6 | Relegation to the 2026 State League 1 |

Source: squadi
Rules for classification: 1) points; 2) goal difference; 3) number of goals scored.
(C) Champions; (O) Play-off winners; (Q) Qualified for the phase indicated; (R) Relegated

==== Finals ====
Semi-finals
1 | Bayswater City | 1
2 | Olympic Kingsway | 0
3 | Perth RedStar | 2 (2)
4 | Perth Glory Youth (p) | 2 (4)

Preliminary Final
Olympic Kingsway | 4
Perth Glory Youth | 0

Grand Final
Bayswater City | 2
Olympic Kingsway | 1

=== 2025 WA State League 1 ===
| Pos | Team | Pld | W | D | L | GF | GA | GD | Pts | Qualification or relegation |
|---|---|---|---|---|---|---|---|---|---|---|
| 1 | Dianella White Eagles (P) | 22 | 14 | 6 | 2 | 46 | 22 | +24 | 48 | Promotion to the 2026 NPL WA |
| 2 | UWA-Nedlands | 22 | 15 | 2 | 5 | 52 | 28 | +24 | 47 | Promotion/relegation play-offs |
| 3 | Joondalup City | 22 | 11 | 6 | 5 | 41 | 26 | +15 | 39 | Promotion/relegation play-offs |
| 4 | Kingsley-Westside | 22 | 10 | 7 | 5 | 36 | 24 | +12 | 37 | Promotion/relegation play-offs |
| 5 | Murdoch University Melville | 22 | 9 | 5 | 8 | 50 | 46 | +4 | 32 | |
| 6 | Gwelup Croatia | 22 | 10 | 2 | 10 | 43 | 39 | +4 | 32 | |
| 7 | Mandurah City | 22 | 8 | 5 | 9 | 34 | 33 | +1 | 29 | |
| 8 | Subiaco AFC | 22 | 8 | 5 | 9 | 33 | 37 | −4 | 29 | |
| 9 | Inglewood United | 22 | 7 | 4 | 11 | 29 | 43 | −14 | 25 | |
| 10 | Curtin University | 22 | 6 | 3 | 13 | 31 | 46 | −15 | 21 | |
| 11 | Kalamunda City (R) | 22 | 5 | 4 | 13 | 23 | 40 | −17 | 19 | Promotion/relegation play-offs |
| 12 | Gosnells City (R) | 22 | 3 | 3 | 16 | 20 | 54 | −34 | 12 | Relegation to the 2026 State League 2 |

Source: Squadi
Rules for classification: 1) points; 2) goal difference; 3) number of goals scored.
(P) Promoted; (R) Relegated

NPL WA/State League 1 Relegation/Promotion Playoff

Semi-finals
NPL 11 | Fremantle City | 1 | 1 | 2
SL1 4 | Kingsley-Westside | 2 | 0 | 2
SL1 2 | UWA-Nedlands | 1 | 2 | 3
SL1 3 | Joondalup City | 3 | 2 | 5

Final
Fremantle City | 2
Joondalup City | 1

=== 2025 WA State League 2 ===
| Pos | Team | Pld | W | D | L | GF | GA | GD | Pts | Qualification or relegation |
|---|---|---|---|---|---|---|---|---|---|---|
| 1 | Quinns FC (P) | 22 | 16 | 3 | 3 | 59 | 31 | +28 | 51 | Promotion to the 2026 State League 1 |
| 2 | Cockburn City (P) | 22 | 15 | 4 | 3 | 48 | 28 | +20 | 49 | Promotion/relegation play-offs |
| 3 | East Perth FC | 22 | 13 | 5 | 4 | 44 | 27 | +17 | 44 | Promotion/relegation play-offs |
| 4 | Forrestfield United | 22 | 11 | 3 | 8 | 41 | 34 | +7 | 36 | Promotion/relegation play-offs |
| 5 | Balga SC | 22 | 10 | 4 | 8 | 40 | 37 | +3 | 34 | |
| 6 | Canning City | 22 | 8 | 4 | 10 | 45 | 42 | +3 | 28 | |
| 7 | Carramar Shamrock Rovers | 22 | 8 | 1 | 13 | 32 | 38 | −6 | 25 | |
| 8 | Wembley Downs | 22 | 8 | 1 | 13 | 43 | 61 | −18 | 25 | |
| 9 | Ashfield SC | 22 | 6 | 6 | 10 | 35 | 45 | −10 | 24 | |
| 10 | Rockingham City | 22 | 5 | 6 | 11 | 31 | 44 | −13 | 21 | |
| 11 | Wanneroo City (R) | 22 | 5 | 4 | 13 | 32 | 41 | −9 | 19 | Promotion/relegation play-offs |
| 12 | Swan United (R) | 22 | 5 | 3 | 14 | 29 | 51 | −22 | 18 | Promotion/relegation play-offs |

Source: Squadi
Rules for classification: 1) points; 2) goal difference; 3) number of goals scored.
(P) Promoted; (R) Relegated

State League 1/State League 2 Relegation/Promotion Playoff

Semi-finals
SL1 11 | Kalamunda City | 1 | 2 | 3
SL2 4 | Forrestfield United | 2 | 0 | 2
SL2 2 | Cockburn City | 2 | 2 | 4
SL2 3 | East Perth FC | 1 | 1 | 2

Final
Kalamunda City | 1 (3)
Cockburn City (p) | 1 (4)

State League 2/Amateur Premier Division Relegation/Promotion Playoff

| Playoff |
| SL2 11 | Wanneroo City | 2 |
| AM3 | Morley-Windmills (P) | 3 |

| Playoff |
| SL2 12 | Swan United | 0 |
| AM2 | North Beach SC (P) | 1 |

== 2025 State Cup ==
=== Mens ===
Western Australian soccer clubs competed in the Football West State Cup competition, which initially involved teams from the Amateur League and Metropolitan League competitions, and from Dalyellup Park Rangers FC from the South West Soccer Association. In the third round, teams from the two divisions of the State League entered, and in the fourth round teams from the National Premier Leagues WA entered.

The competition also served as the Western Australian Preliminary rounds for the 2025 Australia Cup. The two finalists – Olympic Kingsway and Stirling Macedonia – qualified for the final rounds, entering at the Round of 32.

The final was played on 30 August, and won by Stirling Macedonia 2–1, their seventh title.

=== Women's ===
Immediately after the Men's final, Fremantle City played and won the Women's State Cup final, beating Balcatta Etna 3–0, and winning their first title.

== 2025 NPL Women ==
The 2025 NPL WA Women was the sixth season in the National Premier Leagues WA Women format. It was played over 21 rounds as a triple round-robin, followed by an end of season Top 4 Cup competition.

| Pos | Team | Pld | W | D | L | GF | GA | GD | Pts | Qualification or relegation |
|---|---|---|---|---|---|---|---|---|---|---|
| 1 | Perth SC | 21 | 17 | 3 | 1 | 64 | 14 | +50 | 54 | NPLWA-W Top Four Cup |
| 2 | Perth RedStar | 21 | 14 | 1 | 6 | 75 | 32 | +43 | 43 | NPLWA-W Top Four Cup |
| 3 | Football West NTC U-19 | 21 | 13 | 1 | 7 | 62 | 38 | +24 | 40 | NPLWA-W Top Four Cup |
| 4 | Balcatta (C) | 21 | 12 | 2 | 7 | 60 | 30 | +30 | 38 | NPLWA-W Top Four Cup |
| 5 | Fremantle City | 21 | 11 | 3 | 7 | 63 | 31 | +32 | 36 | |
| 6 | Subiaco AFC | 21 | 7 | 1 | 13 | 33 | 55 | −22 | 22 | |
| 7 | UWA Nedlands | 21 | 3 | 2 | 16 | 27 | 97 | −70 | 11 | |
| 8 | Murdoch University Melville (R) | 21 | 0 | 1 | 20 | 3 | 87 | −84 | 1 | Relegation to the 2026 State League |

Source: Squadi
Rules for classification: 1) points; 2) goal difference; 3) number of goals scored.
(C) Champions; (R) Relegated

=== Top four cup ===
Semi-finals
1 | Perth SC | 1 (1)
2 | Perth RedStar (p) | 1 (3)
3 | Football West NTC U-19 | 3
4 | Balcatta | 4

Preliminary Final
Perth SC | 1
Balcatta | 2

Grand Final
Perth RedStar | 1
Balcatta | 5
