= 2008 Football West State League =

Football West State League 2008
- League: (Western Australia) Football West Premier League
- Sport: Association football
- Duration: 2008
- Teams: 12

Football West State League Season
- Premiers: Sorrento FC

Soccer Pools WA State Cup
- Cup Winners: Western Knights

Football West State League seasons
- ← 2007 2009 →

2008 Football West State League took place in Western Australia, organized by Association football. The State League was won by the Western Knights.

== Pre-season changes ==
2007 League	Promoted to league	Relegated from league
Premier League	Mandurah City	Wanneroo City SC

== Table ==
Pos	Team	Pld	W	D	L	GF	GA	GD	Pts	Qualification or relegation
1	Sorrento	22	15	4	3	59	31	+28	49	
2	Floreat Athena	22	14	3	5	47	27	+20	45	
3	Perth SC (C)	22	13	4	5	48	33	+15	43	
4	Inglewood United	22	11	4	7	38	35	+3	37	
5	Mandurah City	22	10	6	6	57	40	+17	36	
6	Stirling Lions	22	9	6	7	42	30	+12	33	
7	Swan IC	22	8	3	11	42	47	−5	27	
8	Cockburn City	22	7	5	10	45	56	−11	26	
9	Western Knights	22	7	3	12	34	51	−17	24	
10	Armadale	22	6	5	11	33	53	−20	23	
11	ECU Joondalup	22	6	4	12	47	51	−4	22	
12	Fremantle Spirit (R)	22	0	5	17	24	62	−38	5	Relegation to 2009 State League Division 1

Source: footballwa.net/past seasons
Rules for classification: 1) points; 2) goal difference; 3) number of goals scored.
(C) Champions; (R) Relegated

=== Finals ===
Semi-finals
2	Floreat Athena	? (2)
3	Perth (p)	? (4)
1	Sorrento	0
4	Inglewood United	1

Grand Final
3	Perth	4
4	Inglewood United	0

Ref:

== Awards ==
=== Fairest & Best ===
- A. Naglieri – Perth SC

=== Footballwa.net Player of the Year ===
- A. Brown – Mandurah City

=== Goalkeeper of the Year ===
- Phil Straker – Stirling Lions

=== Referee of the Year ===
- David Currie

=== Top scorer ===
- P. O'Callaghan – Mandurah City – 25
