= 2013 WA State League Premier Division =

All Flags State League Premier Division 2013
- League: (Western Australia) Football West Premier League
- Sport: Association football
- Duration: 2013
- Teams: 12

Football West State League Season
- Champions: Bayswater City
- Premiers: Stirling Lions

2013 Cool Ridge Cup
- Cup Winners: Bayswater City

Football West State League seasons
- ← 2012 2014 →

The 2013 season of the Western Australian State League Premier Division started on 16 March between eleven clubs and the National Training Squad (NTC). The Season ended on 5 October with the Championship decider. Similar to 2012, the NTC did not play for competition points.

Stirling Lions were the Premiers – their 7th title – and Bayswater City were Champions.

== Pre-season changes ==
2012 League	Promoted to league	Relegated from league	Ref.
State League Premier Division	Cockburn City	Western Knights	

== League table ==
Pos	Team	Pld	W	D	L	GF	GA	GD	Pts	Qualification or relegation
1	Stirling Lions	22	17	3	2	51	27	+24	54	
2	Bayswater City (C)	22	16	2	4	58	30	+28	50	
3	Sorrento	22	12	6	4	48	22	+26	42	
4	Cockburn City	22	13	3	6	48	20	+28	42	
5	Floreat Athena	22	9	6	7	39	39	0	33	
6	Inglewood United	22	8	6	8	39	37	+2	30	
7	Bunbury Forum Force (R)	22	7	3	12	24	33	−9	24	Not selected for the 2014 National Premier Leagues
8	ECU Joondalup	22	6	5	11	37	41	−4	23	
9	Balcatta	22	6	4	12	31	41	−10	22	
10	Perth SC	22	6	4	12	24	39	−15	22	
11	Armadale	22	4	5	13	27	53	−26	17	
12	Football West NTC (R)	22	4	1	17	41	78	−37	0 (Note: N.T.C. did not play for competition points.)	Not selected for the 2014 National Premier Leagues

Source: foxsportspulse.com
Rules for classification: 1) points; 2) goal difference; 3) number of goals scored.
(C) Champions; (R) Relegated

== Finals ==
Qualifying Finals
2	Bayswater City	3
3	Sorrento	0
4	Cockburn City	6
5	Floreat Athena	1

Semi-finals
1	Stirling Lions	1
2	Bayswater City	4
3	Sorrento	2
4	Cockburn City	0

Preliminary Final
1	Stirling Lions	3
3	Sorrento	1

Grand Final
2	Bayswater City	2
1	Stirling Lions	1
