= 2007 Football West State League =

Football West State League 2007
- League: (Western Australia) Football West Premier League
- Sport: Association football
- Duration: 2007
- Number of teams: 12

Football West State League Season
- Premiers: Floreat Athena

Soccer Pools WA State Cup
- Cup Winners: Stirling Lions

Football West State League seasons
- ← 2006 2008 →

Floreat Athena completed the league season undefeated, the first time that had occurred since 1990 (when Floreat also had an undefeated league season).

== Pre-season changes ==
2006 League	Promoted to league	Relegated from league
Football West State League	Fremantle Spirit	Bayswater City

== Table ==
Pos	Team	Pld	W	D	L	GF	GA	GD	Pts	Qualification or relegation
1	Floreat Athena (C)	22	18	4	0	70	28	+42	58	
2	Perth SC	22	13	4	5	58	24	+34	43	
3	Stirling Lions	22	12	4	6	39	34	+5	40	
4	Cockburn City	22	11	5	6	42	33	+9	38	
5	Inglewood United	22	11	3	8	41	37	+4	36	
6	ECU Joondalup	22	9	8	5	42	27	+15	35	
7	Western Knights	22	9	5	8	52	37	+15	32	
8	Fremantle Spirit	22	8	5	9	32	32	0	29	
9	Swan IC	22	6	3	13	39	61	−22	21	
10	Armadale	22	5	4	13	21	42	−21	19	
11	Sorrento	22	4	4	14	37	53	−16	16	
12	Wanneroo City (R)	22	1	1	20	26	91	−65	4	Relegation to 2008 State League Division 1

Source: footballwa.net/past seasons
Rules for classification: 1) points; 2) goal difference; 3) number of goals scored.
(C) Champions; (R) Relegated
