= Mark Pritchard (footballer) =

Welsh footballer

Personal information
- Birth name: Mark Owen Pritchard
- Date of birth: 23 November 1985 (age 40)
- Place of birth: Cardiff, Wales
- Position: Forward

Youth career
- Swansea City

Senior career*
Years	Team	Apps	(Gls)
2003–2006	Swansea City	4	(0)
2005	→ Merthyr Tydfil (loan)	4	(0)
2006–2007	Aldershot Town	23	(1)
2007–2009	Llanelli	66	(17)
2009–2010	Carmarthen Town	31	(2)
2010	Goytre United		
2010–2011	Oxford City	0	(0)
2011–2013	Floreat Athena		(14)
2014–2015	Perth SC	39	(15)
2016–2017	Inglewood United	33	(5)
2017	Floreat Athena	9	(0)
2018	Subiaco AFC	8	(0)

International career
2002	Wales U19	3	(0)
2005–2006	Wales U21	4	(2)
2008	Wales Semi-Pro	1	(0)
- * Club domestic league appearances and goals as of 2 May 2010

Mark Owen Pritchard (born 23 November 1985, in Tredegar) is a Welsh footballer who plays for Subiaco AFC

== Career ==
Pritchard began his career at Swansea City, making his professional debut on 21 October 2003 during a 2–0 defeat to Cambridge United.

After a short spell on loan with Merthyr Tydfil at the end of the 2004–05 season, Swansea boss Kenny Jackett deemed him surplus to requirements at the Liberty Stadium and he was allowed to join Conference National side Aldershot Town, where he scored his first senior career goal during a 4–2 defeat to Blackpool in the FA Cup.

After a relatively successful two-year spell at Llanelli he was released by the club and joined local rivals, Carmarthen Town, in the summer of 2009. He left Carmarthen in 2010, spending a brief spell at Goytre United before joining Oxford City.

Pritchard moved to Western Australia in 2011 to link up with Floreat Athena. He won the clubs Fairest and Best award twice in three seasons and also represented the State against A-League side Perth Glory.

A switch for the 2014 season took Pritchard to Perth SC where he was a key feature of the starting eleven across two seasons. He transferred to Inglewood United for the 2016 National Premier Leagues season.
