= David Cyrus =

Grenadian footballer (born 1989)

Personal information
- Date of birth: 8 March 1989 (age 37)
- Position: Defender

Team information
- Current team: Inglewood United

Senior career*
Years	Team	Apps	(Gls)
2009–2010	Bradford Park Avenue		
2010	Ossett Town		
2010–2011	Bradford Park Avenue		
2011–2013	Frickley Athletic		
2013–2014	Balcatta	24	(1)
2014–2015	Perth SC	16	(0)
2016–	Inglewood United	96	(10)

International career^{‡}
2010–	Grenada	16	(0)
- * Club domestic league appearances and goals as of 8 November 2021 ‡ National team caps and goals as of 22 May 2011

David Cyrus (born 8 March 1989) is a Grenadian international footballer who plays as a defender for Inglewood United in the NPL Western Australia.

== Career ==
Cyrus has played club football in England for Bradford Park Avenue, Ossett Town and most notably Frickley Athletic.

Whilst playing for Frickley Athletic Cyrus famously rejected a call up to the Grenada national team to play for Frickley in the F.A. Cup.

In 2013 Cyrus moved to Western Australia and initially played for Balcatta. He switched to Perth SC early in 2015 and has joined Inglewood United for the 2016 season.

Cyrus made his international debut for Grenada on 26 November 2010.
