= Alex Salmon =

English footballer (born 1994)

Personal information
- Full name: Alexander Mark Salmon
- Date of birth: 9 July 1994 (age 32)
- Place of birth: Birkenhead, England
- Position: Forward

Team information
- Current team: Green Gully SC
- Number: 9

Youth career
- 2011–2013: Carlisle United

Senior career*
Years	Team	Apps	(Gls)
2013–2014	Carlisle United	3	(0)
2013	→ Alloa Athletic (loan)	5	(1)
2014	Workington	0	(0)
2014	Celtic Nation	2	(0)
2014–2015	Workington	34	(7)
2016	Armadale SC	8	(5)
2016	Bayswater City SC	8	(6)
2017–2018	Inglewood United	46	(46)
2019–2022	Green Gully SC	57	(41)
2023–	Oakleigh Cannons FC	24	(13)
- * Club domestic league appearances and goals as of 29 January 2025

Alexander Mark Salmon (born 9 July 1994) is an English footballer who plays as a forward for Green Gully SC in the National Premier Leagues Victoria in Australia. He has previously played for Alloa Athletic, Carlisle United, Celtic Nation and Workington, along with Western Australian clubs Armadale, Bayswater City and Inglewood United.

== Career ==
Salmon began his career with Carlisle United and made his professional debut on 20 April 2013 in a 3–1 defeat against Bournemouth.

On 30 August 2013, Salmon joined Scottish Championship side Alloa Athletic on a six-month loan deal. On 17 December 2013, the loan was ended after four months. Following his return to Carlisle he was released.

In January 2014 Salmon joined Conference North side Workington on a one-month deal but didn't get to play due to postponements because of the weather. After his contract expired he left and signed for Northern League Division One side Celtic Nation until the end of the 2013–2014 season.

Salmon returned to Workington A.F.C for the 2014–2015 season and made 28 appearances, scoring 4 goals in all competitions.

Salmon signed on with National Premier League side Armadale SC at the beginning of 2016 but transferred mid-season to Bayswater City SC. He switched to Inglewood United for the 2017 campaign. After taking out back-to-back golden boots for Inglewood, Salmon moved to Victoria to join Green Gully SC in the National Premier Leagues Victoria for 2019.
