= 2021 Football West State Cup =

Australian football tournament

2021 State Cup
Tournament details
- Teams: 65

Final positions
- Champions: Floreat Athena

Western Australian soccer clubs competed in 2021 for the Football West State Cup. Clubs entered from the National Premier Leagues WA, the two divisions of the State League, a limited number of teams from various divisions of the 2021 Amateur League, Metropolitan League and Masters League competitions, and from regional teams from the Goldfields, South West and Great Southern regions.

This knockout competition was won by Floreat Athena, their eighth title.

The competition also served as the Western Australian Preliminary Rounds for the 2021 FFA Cup. The two finalists – ECU Joondalup and Floreat Athena – qualified for the final rounds, entering at the Round of 32.

== Format ==
Round	Clubs remaining	Winners from previous round	New entries this round	Match Dates
Round 2	65	none	24 (inc. 6 byes)	20 Feb–7 Mar
Round 3	42	12	30	19–27 Mar
Round 4	32	21	11	30 Mar–13 Apr
Round 5	16	16	none	15–19 May
Round 6	8	8	none	1–2 Jun
Round 7	4	4	none	22–23 Jun
Final	2	2	none	17 Jul

== Preliminary rounds ==
A total of 65 teams took part in the competition, from Perth-based and regional-based competitions.

== Final ==
The 2021 State Cup Final was played at the neutral venue of Inglewood Stadium. Floreat defender Ben Steele received the Player of the Match award.

17 July 2021	Floreat Athena	1–0	ECU Joondalup	Inglewood Stadium
1730	Murray 56'	Report
