= Paul Wormley =

English footballer

- Wormley in 1988 with Floreat Athena

Personal information
- Date of birth: 16 September 1961 (age 65)
- Place of birth: Leeds, England
- Position: Striker

Senior career*
Years	Team	Apps	(Gls)
1977–1979	Yorkshire Amateur		
1979–1980	Barnsley	3	(1)
1980–1981	Huddersfield Town	0	(0)
1981	Launceston Juventus	17	(16)
1982	Townsville Kern United	22	(17)
1983	West Adelaide SC	22	(9)
1984–1989	Floreat Athena	253	(168)
1989–1990	Eastern Sports Club	16	(9)
1990	Perth SC	14	(11)
1991	Fremantle City	21	(12)
1992–1996	Inglewood United	92	(53)

Managerial career
- 1996–1998: Inglewood United
- 1998: Western Knights
- 1999–2002: Western Australia State
- * Club domestic league appearances and goals

Paul Wormley (born 16 September 1961) is a former English professional footballer born in the UK who played & Coached in Australia and Hong Kong throughout the 1980s, 1990s and early 2000s.

== Career ==
Born in Leeds, Yorkshire, Wormley was a regular player with the Leeds United youth team, and played for Leeds City Boys from under 11 through to under 15. He also represented Yorkshire School Boys and was an England Schoolboy international.

After playing as a young teenager in open age non-league football for Yorkshire Amateur, he signed professionally for Barnsley, where he made his English league debut. He made his league debut against Bury in 1979 at the age of 17. He then signed for Huddersfield Town, but due to a serious knee injury he never made a first team appearance for the club in the league, though did play regularly for the reserve team.

In 1981 Wormley was contracted to play out in Australia on a sporting visa, joining Launceston Juventus in Tasmania, before moving with Ken Worden to Townsville Kern United in 1982. Townsville won both the league championship and Ampol cup that year, the first Queensland club to do so. In 1983 he was signed by West Adelaide SC and played under Alan Vest. When Vest moved to Floreat Athena in 1984, he convinced Wormley to join him. He went on to finish as the club's leading scorer in five of the next seven seasons, winning many trophies including the State league and domestic cup three consecutive seasons.

Wormley represented the Western Australian state team for seven seasons between 1984 and 1990. During this period, he participated in tours of Asia and matches against visiting clubs, including Nottingham Forest, Millwall and FC Torpedo Moscow.
