= 2019 Football West State Cup =

2019 State Cup
Tournament details
- Teams: 56

Final positions
- Champions: Floreat Athena

Western Australian soccer clubs competed in 2019 for the Football West State Cup, known for sponsorship reasons as the Belt Up State Cup. Clubs entered from the National Premier Leagues WA, the two divisions of the State League, a limited number of teams from various divisions of the 2019 Amateur League, Metropolitan League and Masters League competitions, and from regional teams from the South West and Great Southern regions.

This knockout competition was won by Floreat Athena, their seventh title.

The competition also served as the Western Australian Preliminary Rounds for the 2019 FFA Cup. The two finalists – Bayswater City and Floreat Athena – qualified for the final rounds, entering at the Round of 32.

== Format ==
Round	Clubs remaining	Winners from previous round	New entries this round	Main Dates
Round 1	56	none	6	9–10 Mar
Round 2	53	none	16 (inc. 11 byes)	23–24 Mar
Round 3	49	15	23 (inc. 4 byes)	6–7 Apr
Round 4	32	21	11	22 Apr
Round 5	16	16	none	18–30 May
Round 6	8	8	none	3 Jun
Round 7	4	4	none	15–16 Jun
Final	2	2	none	20 Jul

== Preliminary rounds ==
A total of 56 teams took part in the competition, from Perth-based and regional-based competitions.

== Final ==
The 2019 State Cup Final was played on 20 July 2019, at the neutral venue of Dorrien Gardens.

20 July 2019	Floreat Athena	2–1	Bayswater City	Dorrien Gardens
1500	Galan 71' (pen.); Arnold 81'	Report	Nicol 51' (pen.)	Referee: Josh Mannella
