= Ludovic Boi =

Mauritian footballer

Personal information
- Full name: Ludovic Boi
- Date of birth: 27 March 1989 (age 37)
- Place of birth: Port-Louis, Mauritius
- Height: 1.62 m (5 ft 4 in)
- Position: Right winger

Team information
- Current team: Subiaco AFC
- Number: 8

Youth career
- Stirling Lions
- 2008–2010: Perth Glory

Senior career*
Years	Team	Apps	(Gls)
2008	Stirling Lions	?	(?)
2009–2010	Perth Glory	1	(0)
2010–2011	Stirling Lions	?	(?)
2012–	Floreat Athena	?	(?)
- * Club domestic league appearances and goals as of 11 July 2012

Ludovic Boi (born 27 March 1989) is a Mauritian footballer who plays in the Football West State League for Subiaco AFC.

== Career ==
Boi began playing football in Mauritius for Racing Club before moving with his family to Australia in 2001.

Ludovic started out his professional career with Stirling Lions. After that, he signed on for the inaugural Perth Glory youth squad, featuring prominently. On 1 November 2009 he made his senior debut for Perth Glory as a substitute against Melbourne Victory. In 2010, he rejoined Stirling Lions.

In 2012, he joined Floreat Athena, captaining them for a period of time. Over a decade later, he is still playing there.

== A-League career statistics ==
(Correct as of 20 April 2010)

Club	Season	League			Finals			Asia			Total		
Club	Season	Apps	Goals	Assists	Apps	Goals	Assists	Apps	Goals	Assists	Apps	Goals	Assists
Perth Glory	2009–10	1	0	0	-	-	-	-	-	-	1	0	0
Perth Glory	2010–11	0	0	0	-	-	-	-	-	-	0	0	0
Total		1	0	0	-	-	-	-	-	-	1	0	0

== Honours ==
Personal honours

- National Youth League Top Scorer: 2009-2010 with Perth Glory - 5 goals (tied with Glen Trifiro)
