= Canning City SC =

Football club based in Western Australia

- Full name: Canning City Football Club
- Nicknames: The Blues, Blue & Whites, City
- Founded: 1972
- Ground: Willetton Sports Club; Burrendah Boulevard, Willetton
- Capacity: ~3000
- Chairman: Jeff Rowlands
- Manager: Lee Hayward
- League: State League 2
- 2025: 6th of 12
- Website: https://canningcityfc.org.au/
Home colours	Away colours	Third colours

Canning City Soccer Club is a football (soccer) club, based in Willetton, Western Australia, who play their home games at the Willetton Sports Club in the City of Canning. They were originally established as Canning Corinthians in 1972, that entity dissolving in 1992, before returning to the Western Australia State League in 2001 as Canning City Soccer Club. The club currently (2019) competes in the Football West State League Division 2.

== Club history ==
Canning Corinthians were formed in 1972, by David Schrandt and John Reilly, and began competing in the old Third Division of the Soccer Federation of WA. Success was not far off, as in 1976, Corinthians won promotion to the Second Division. Corinthians enjoyed 7 solid years in the second division, finishing in mid-table places before being relegated at the end of the 1983 season.

Although hoping to return to the Second Division, it was not to be, and only one season after finding themselves competing in this division they were relegated further to the Fourth Division. Three years of mid-high table finishes culminated in 2nd place in the league in 1988, and a return to Third Division football. Corinthians spent 3 years in this division, eventually winning it in 1991 to ensure a return to the old Second Division.

Corinthians spent one last successful season in the Second Division, finishing a respectable 7th place, however, off the field, plans were in place that would change the club. In 1993, Canning Corinthians merged with Melville Alemania to become the Leeming Strikers football club. The junior entity of Canning Corinthians remained, however policy was introduced by Football West that dictated that clubs could no longer use ethnic, or national, names or logos. The junior club was hence rebranded as Canning Cosmos.

By the 1980s, Canning Corinthians had developed one of the largest junior clubs in Western Australia. Under the guidance of the soccer committee at the time, the club decided that it would again compete as a senior side in the semi-professional leagues, giving opportunity for the junior players to stay at the club and play in the senior divisions. The new team in the senior division took on the name of Canning City Soccer, entering the State League First Division in 2001.

After only 7 years in the First Division, Canning City won promotion to the Premier League by 9pts over its nearest rival. The strong history of the junior soccer program was instrumental in this promotion as nearly all of the first team squad had played football at some stage for the Canning Cosmos.

Canning's debut in the Premier League started off considerably well taking points off Swan United FC, Inglewood United, Sorrento FC and Floreat Athena. However a poor 2nd half of the season saw the team slowly creep down the ladder, and only taking 2pts from 11 fixtures left the club bottom of the table. A 1–0 loss to Floreat Athena in the return fixture at Willetton Sports Club confirmed relegation for the club, as closest rivals Cockburn City were able to beat an under-strength Perth SC 2–0.

The team currently plays in division 2 of the state league which is the bottom tier of the state league.

== Club honours ==
Date	Honours
2008	Football West First Division Champions
2006	Football West First Division Night Series Winners
2008	Football West First Division Night Series Runners-Up
1976, 1991	State Second Division Winners
1988	State Third Division Cup Runners-Up

=== League record ===
The table below shows Canning City's final standings in past seasons.

Season	P	W	D	L	F	A	GD	Pts	Pos	Competition
2001	21	4	2	15	26	60	−34	14	17th	Soccer West Coast First Division
2002	24	9	2	13	37	37	0	29	12th	Soccer West Coast First Division
2003	30	5	5	20	37	68	−31	20	16th	Soccer West Coast First Division
2004	28	17	4	7	68	43	+25	55	3rd	Soccer West Coast First Division
2005	20	7	3	10	39	32	+7	24	11th	Football West State League Division One
2006	20	9	3	8	39	34	+5	30	5th	Football West State League Division One
2007	22	11	5	6	51	36	+15	38	5th	Football West State League Division One
2008	22	16	6	0	70	28	+42	54	1st	Football West State League Division One
2009	22	5	3	14	39	52	−13	18	12th	Football West Premier League
2010	22	8	6	8	42	42	0	30	6th	Football West State League Division One
2011	22	1	2	19	21	85	−64	5	12th	Football West State League Division One
2012	24	12	2	10	44	37	+7	38	7th	Football West State League Division One
2013	22	15	2	5	45	27	+18	47	3rd	Football West State League Division One
2014	22	8	5	9	38	34	+4	29	6th	Football West State League Division One
2015	22	5	2	15	36	57	−21	17	10th	Football West State League Division One
2016	22	9	5	8	33	30	+3	32	6th	Football West State League Division One
2021	22	5	0	17	30	53	-23	15	11h	Football West State League Division One
