= Inglewood United FC =

Inglewood United
- Full name: Inglewood United Football Club
- Founded: 1951
- Ground: Inglewood Stadium
- Capacity: 7,000
- President: Anthony Rowling
- Manager: Glen Grostate
- 2025: 9th of 12
- Website: www.inglewoodunitedfc.com.au
Home colours	Away colours

Inglewood United Football Club is an Australian semi-professional soccer club based in Inglewood, a suburb of Perth, Western Australia. They compete in the State League 1. They are based at Inglewood Stadium.

Inglewood have won the State League Premier League once, in 1996, and the State Cup twice, in 1977 and 1999. Their most recent success was in the 2021 NPL Night Series when they beat Perth Soccer Club 2–0 in a convincing win. They last won the Night Series in 2005 when they lifted the trophy by defeating Swan I.C. 3–0.

== History ==
Kiev Soccer Club was founded in March 1951 by Alexander Minko and Igor Schorsch, migrants from Ukraine. The club took its name from Kyiv, the capital of Ukraine, and the famous Dynamo Kyiv team.

Their playing colours of gold and blue were adopted from the Ukrainian national flag in the late 1960s. The clubs' original playing strip was all-black.

Kiev's first competitive game was on 12 April 1953 when they claimed a 3–1 victory over Wundowie in Division Three North of the Western Australian Soccer Football Association.

In 1962 Kiev entered Division One of the newly formed Western Australian Soccer Federation. The club finished second to Swan Valley to gain promotion to the top flight for the first time.

For the next few years they bounced between the top two tiers, changing their name from Kiev to Kiev-Victoria Park and then back to Kiev.

Spells at Langley Park in Perth, Weston Street in Carlisle and Raphael Park in Victoria Park preceded the club's 1963 relocation to Walter Road Reserve (now Inglewood Stadium) in Inglewood, which remains their home ground to this day.

1964 saw Kiev capture their first trophy by finishing top of Division One, with State representative Peter Atkinson voted the league's Player of the Year. Another second tier championship followed in 1967.

Kiev announced their top flight return by placing second to Perth Azzurri on the 1968 league table. They went on to win the Top Four Cup, downing Cracovia 2–1 in the final courtesy of a Bev Allan double.

1970 brought about another name change – to Inglewood Kiev – and within twelve months a 21-year lease was arranged for the use of Walter Road Reserve.

Striker Len Dundo scored himself a hat-trick of Golden Boots as the top flight's leading goal scorer in 1972, 1973 and 1974. In those three seasons alone Dundo amassed 77 goals for Inglewood.

The fundraising efforts of long-time club secretary Jack Soer were instrumental in ensuring the club maintained a strong financial position throughout the 1970s.

Inglewood commemorated their 25th anniversary with the construction of clubrooms at the northern end of the ground, under the guidance of Vladimir Mandyczewsky. The new bar and office facilities were officially opened in November 1976.

1977 is remembered as the year that Inglewood truly came of age. Robert Earl (3) and Nick Macallum (2) may have scored the goals in a 5–1 State Cup final mauling of Spearwood Dalmatinac, but it was defender Jimmy Smith who was recognised as best on ground.

English import Gordon Todd celebrated his first State League season by taking out the Gold Medal, awarded to the top flights’ best player. John Davidson ensured the year ended on a high by scoring the solitary goal in a 1–0 Top Four Cup victory over Floreat Athena.

Lee Adam created State League history by becoming the first player to collect two Gold Medals, the midfielder winning the prestigious award in 1978 and again in 1980.

Memories of England's 1966 World Cup win were revived in mid-1981 when team captain Bobby Moore joined Inglewood for two guest appearances.

Midfield livewire Norrie Sutton became Inglewood's fourth Gold Medal winner in six seasons when he won the award in 1982.

Inglewood lifted their first Night Series trophy in 1983. A Paddy Morris goal in the first period of extra-time was enough to gain a 1–0 win over West Perth Macedonia. Further success eluded the club in the years that followed, culminating in relegation to the second tier in 1987.

It wasn't until a competition restructure in 1993, brought on by the formation of new peak body the Professional Soccer Federation, that top flight football returned to Inglewood. The following year new president Siggy Kramer secured a new 10-year lease on Walter Road Reserve.

The club entered 1995 as Inglewood Falcons and ended it as Premier League runners-up and Top Four Cup finalists. Jason Ainsley was the runaway winner of that season's Gold Medal.

Inglewood reached the State League pinnacle by winning the 1996 Premier League under the management of Paul Wormley. Goals in the final minutes of the season by Scott Daley and veteran Ian Ballantyne earned the club a 2–1 victory over near-neighbours Bayswater City, and their first league title. Norrie Sutton collected his second Gold Medal, Ronnie More was named Goalkeeper of the Year and Paul Wormley the Coach of the Year.

The State Cup returned to Inglewood in 1999 courtesy of Gavin Tait, whose second half header was enough to see off Floreat Athena 1–0.

A rebranding to Inglewood United in 2000 preceded the negotiation of a new 25-year lease on Walter Road Reserve. The following year the club celebrated their 50th anniversary with the opening of a new 1,000-seat stadium, the Kramer Family Stand, on the western side of Walter Road Reserve.

Although recognised as one of the State League's powerhouse clubs, Inglewood's only trophy capture of recent times has been the 2021 WA NPL Night Series.

By contrast, individual accolades have flowed for Inglewood players. Robert Zabica (2000), Oliver Taseski (2001, 2009 and 2011) and Alex Dunn (2018, 2019, 2020) were honoured with the Goalkeeper of the Year award, Louis Parkinson (2003), Jack Clisby (2012) and Alex Salmon (2017) added their names to the Gold Medal winners list, with the latter also scoring the Golden Boot (2017).

== Honours ==
National Premier Leagues Western Australia Champions: 1996

National Premier Leagues Western Australia Runners-up: 1968, 1977, 1994, 1995, 2016, 2017, 2019

State Cup Winners: 1977, 1999

State Cup Runners-up: 1981, 1995, 2005, 2009, 2023

Top Four Cup Winners: 1968, 1977

Top Four Cup Runners-up: 1982, 2008, 1994, 1995, 1996, 2016, 2019

Night Series Winners: 1983, 2005, 2021

Night Series Runners-up: 1976, 1979, 1997, 2000, 2023

Division One Champions: 1964, 1967

Division One Runners-up: 1962

Division Three Cup Winners: 1959

== Current squad ==
As of 20 January 2025

Note: Flags indicate national team as defined under FIFA eligibility rules; some limited exceptions apply. Players may hold more than one non-FIFA nationality.

No.	Pos.	Nation	Player
—	GK	IRL	Conor Hogan
—	GK	AUS	Jordan Brown
—	GK	AUS	James Lindsay
—	GK	AUS	Filip Gluhovic
—	DF	IRL	Jason Dunphy
—	DF	AUS	Filip Minic
—	DF	AUS	Ciarán Salinger (captain)
—	DF	AUS	Henry Curtis
—	DF	IRL	Shane McMonagle
—	DF	AUS	Levi Maunovski
—	DF	AUS	Raphael Kanzi
—	MF	AUS	Christopher Tilson
—	MF	IRL	Ryan Hogan
—	MF	ENG	Harry Evans (vice-captain)
—	MF	AUS	Jordan Black
—	MF	AUS	Oliver Niyobuhugiro
—	MF	USA	Jason Hogan
—	MF	AUS	Mathew Keith

No.	Pos.	Nation	Player
—	MF	AUS	Mou Marial
—	MF	AUS	Mathew Smith
—	MF	IRL	Martin Coughlan
—	MF	AUS	Daniel Radeski
—	MF	AUS	Ashton Rebelo
—	MF	AUS	Hayden Lowe
—	MF	AUS	Galana Eba
—	FW	AUS	Chad Nilson
—	FW	IRL	Ciarán Byrne
—	FW	IRL	Dean Hurley
—	FW	AUS	Daniel Nikoloski
—	FW	AUS	Mou Marial
—	FW	AUS	Ivan Skorich
—	FW	AUS	Stefan Poposki
—	FW	AUS	Phillip Klimoski
—	FW	AUS	Ricky Nyersh

== Coaching staff ==
- Technical Director:
- First Team Coach: Glen Grostate
- First Team Assistant Coach: Bobi Terzioski
- First Team Physio:
- Goalkeeper Coach: Alberto Medrano
- Manager: Stephen McCubbin

== Season by season record ==
Season	League									Cup	NS	Finals	Top goalscorer (League only)
Season	Division	P	W	D	L	F	A	Pts	Pos	Cup	NS	Finals	Top goalscorer (League only)
1994	Premier Division	22	12	5	5	39	30	29	2nd				
1995	Premier Division	18	12	2	4	36	22	38	2nd	2nd			
1996	Premier Division	18	13	2	3	34	18	41	1st				
1997	Premier Division	26	13	8	5	51	37	47	4th				
1998	Premier Division	22	8	7	7	42	38	31	8th		GS		
1999	Premier Division	22	8	6	8	29	34	30	7th	1st	SF		
2000	Premier Division	22	12	4	6	35	19	40	4th	QF	2nd	5th	Paul Lincoln (10 goals)
2001	Premier Division	18	6	4	8	27	32	22	8th	SF	SF	DNQ	Elton Holmes and Paul Lincoln (5 goals)
2002	Premier Division	22	11	2	9	48	41	35	5th	SF	GS	4th	Louis Parkinson (9 goals)
2003	Premier Division	20	9	4	7	32	36	31	4th	R2	QF	5th	Louis Parkinson (11 goals)
2004	Premier Division	22	9	5	8	42	28	32	6th	R2	GS	DNQ	Bobby Despotovski (13 goals)
2005	Premier Division	22	11	3	8	45	35	36	4th	2nd	1st	-	Andre Sarpe (7 goals)
2006	Premier Division	22	6	5	11	35	42	23	9th	R2	GS	-	Louis Parkinson (14 goals)
2007	Premier Division	22	11	3	8	41	37	36	5th	SF	GS	-	Daniel Niederberger (10 goals)
2008	Premier Division	22	11	4	7	38	35	37	4th	R2	GS	2nd	Mladen Kovacevic and James Sammut (7 goals)
2009	Premier Division	22	8	5	9	33	37	29	7th	2nd	SF	DNQ	Albert Osei-Tutu (8 goals)
2010	Premier Division	22	8	2	12	27	42	26	9th	R1	GS	DNQ	Ryan Clarke (9 goals)
2011	Premier Division	22	11	4	7	51	37	37	3rd	R1	QF	4th	Rory Grant (15 goals)
2012	Premier Division	22	13	4	5	45	30	43	4th	SF	QF	5th	Aleks Jovic (11 goals)
2013	Premier Division	22	8	6	8	39	27	30	6th	SF	QF	DNQ	Greg Sharland (12 goals)
2014	National Premier Leagues	22	6	4	12	36	64	15	10th	QF	SF	DNQ	Ryan Clarke (14 goals)
2015	National Premier Leagues	22	8	3	11	28	46	27	7th	R5	GS	DNQ	David Micevski (6 goals)
2016	National Premier Leagues	22	13	3	6	44	32	42	2nd	SF	GS	2nd	Kenny Keogh and Brian Woodall (9 goals)
2017	National Premier Leagues	26	16	7	3	73	33	55	2nd	R4	QF	3rd	Alex Salmon (28 goals)
2018	National Premier Leagues	26	13	7	6	50	38	46	5th	R4	R1	DNQ	Alex Salmon (17 goals)
2019	National Premier Leagues	22	11	5	6	38	36	38	2nd	R4	GS	2nd	
2020	National Premier Leagues	11	4	2	5	16	18	14	8th	N/A Covid		DNQ	S Jackson (6 goals)
2021	National Premier Leagues	22	10	4	8	48	41	34	5th	R4	1st	DNQ	Steve Sokol (18 goals)
2022	National Premier Leagues	22	9	3	10	26	27	30	6th	QF	SF	DNQ	Manase Abandelwa (8 goals)
2023	National Premier Leagues	22	7	6	9	38	39	27	9th	2nd	2nd	DNQ	Shubham Mokala (9 goals)
2024	National Premier Leagues	22	2	3	17	23	66	9	12th	R5	GS	DNQ	Benson Nsegetse and Yamamoto Kotaro (4 goals)
2025	State League Division 1	22	7	4	11	29	43	25	9th	SF	GS		Chad Nilson (7 goals)
2026	State League Division 1												

Champions	Runners-up	Promoted	Relegated

=== Key ===
Key	Meaning	Key	Meaning
P	Games Played	GS	Group Stage
W	Games Won	R1	Round 1
D	Games Drawn	R2	Round 2
L	Games Lost	R3	Round 3
F	Goals For	R4	Round 4
A	Goals Against	R5	Round 5
Pts	Points	QF	Quarter-Finals
Pos	Final Position	SF	Semi-Finals
Cup	Football West State Cup	RU	Runners-up
NS	Night Series	W	Winners
Finals	Top 4/5 Cup	DNQ	Did not qualify

== Coaches and players ==
=== Head coach ===
Listed according to first competitive game as Head Coach:

- (C) – Caretaker

- 1953 not recorded
- 1957 Val Zazula
- 1959 (England) Alf Tipton
- 1965 (England) Danny Burton
- 1966 (England) Peter Atkinson
- 1967 (Romania) Siggy Kramer
- 1970 Frank Schaper
- 1970 (England) John Adshead
- 1972 (Poland) Zyggie Pieda
- 1974 John Lovell
- 1975 Mick Jones
- 1975 (Australia) Jimmy Pearson
- 1979 (Poland) Zyggie Pieda
- 1980 (Australia) Jimmy Pearson
- 1982 Gordon Todd
- 1985 (England) John Sydenham
- 1986 Alf De Bono
- 1987 Derek Henderson
- 1987 Colin Ashley
- 1988 B.Newell
- 1990 (Australia) John Coyne
- 1991 (Scotland) Ernie Hannighan
- 1992 (Australia) Roy Jones
- 1993 (England) Eddy Hodgkinson
- 1996 Paul Wormley
- 1998 Ian Buckley
- 1998 (Scotland) John Hunter
- 2001 Steve Parkinson
- 2002 Bob Braid (C)
- 2002 (Australia) Jimmy Pearson
- 2003 Paddy Morris (C)
- 2003 (England) Eddy Hodgkinson
- 2006 (England) Alan Vest
- 2007 (Australia) Bobby Despotovski
- 2008 (England) Lee Bamber
- 2009 (England) Alan Vest (C)
- 2009 (Australia) Shane Pryce
- 2012 (England) Graham Normanton
- 2014 (Australia) Goran Stajic (C)
- 2015 (Australia) Michael Garcia
- 2016 (Greece) Taki Nicolaides
- 2017 (Republic of Ireland) Andy Keogh
- 2019 (England) Trim Morgan
- 2019 (Australia) Andres Oliveira
- 2024 (Greece) Taki Nicolaides
- 2024 (Serbia) Aleksandar Stanojevic
- 2025 (Serbia) Aleksandar Stanojevic

=== Player of the Year ===
- 1979 (Ukraine) Peter Baczynski
- 1980 Neil Mearns
- 1981 (Australia) Peter Baczynski
- 1982 (Scotland) Norrie Sutton
- 1983 Mel Weston
- 1984 Mark Johnson
- 1985 Richie Paskins
- 1986 John Cockerill
- 1987 Dean Paini
- 1988 Paul Mooney and Andy Godfrey
- 1989 (Republic of Ireland) Donal O'Brien
- 1990 not recorded
- 1991 Steve McCaffrey
- 1992 Paul Gorst
- 1993 Martin Guilfoyle
- 1994 Paul Gibbon
- 1995 (England) Jason Ainsley
- 1996 Tony Hall
- 1997 Martin Woodall
- 1998 (England) Lee Crosby
- 1999 Steve McDonald
- 2000 (Australia) Robbie Zabica
- 2001 Jamie Goodman
- 2002 Jamie Goodman
- 2003 (Scotland) Alan MacKenzie
- 2004 (Australia) Greg Sharland
- 2005 (Australia) Shaun Kilkelly
- 2006 (Australia) Shane Pryce
- 2007 (Australia) Shane Pryce
- 2008 (Australia) James Sammut
- 2009 (Australia) Shane Pryce
- 2010 (Australia) Ryan Clarke
- 2011 (Scotland) Rory Grant
- 2012 (Australia) Jack Clisby
- 2013 (Australia) Greg Sharland
- 2014 (Australia) Ryan Clarke
- 2015 (England) Tim Gould
- 2016 (Australia) John Migas
- 2017 (England) Alex Salmon
- 2018 (Grenada) David Cyrus
- 2019 (South Sudan) Chok Dau
- 2020 (Democratic Republic of the Congo) Anthony Bafabousha
- 2021 (Australia) Steve Sokol
- 2022 (Australia) Alex Dunn
- 2023 (Australia) Matthew Ntoumenopoulos

=== Notable past players ===
List includes players from Inglewood youth or senior teams that have gone on to represent the Australian national team or similar, or have amassed over 100 games with Perth Glory FC or similar.

- (Australia) Gary Marocchi
- (Australia) Robert Zabica
- (Scotland) Alan MacKenzie
- (Australia) Bobby Despotovski (also has the all-time goal-scoring record with Perth Glory FC)
- (Australia) Nikita Rukavytsya
- (Grenada) David Cyrus
- (New Zealand) Lewis Italiano
