= Joondalup United FC =

Football club in Perth, Western Australia

- Full name: Joondalup United Football Club
- Nickname: United
- Founded: 2000
- Ground: Forrest Park, Padbury
- Capacity: 1,000
- President: John Stone
- Manager: Nick Jennings
- League: State League 1
- 2024: 9th of 12 (Withdrawn)
- Website: https://www.jufc.com.au/
Home colours	Away colours

Joondalup United Football Club is an Australian semi-professional soccer club based in the northern suburbs of Perth, with grounds at Forrest Park in Padbury, Prince Regent Park in Heathridge, Charonia Reserve in Mullaloo, and Beldon Park in Beldon. They currently compete in the Football West State League Division 1 and use Forrest Park as their home ground for their senior teams.

== History ==
The club was established in 2000 within the Perth amateur leagues. They were successful in 2014 with an application to play in the Football West State League Division 2 for the first time, and claimed the league title by going undefeated.

As well as its State League set up, the club partakes in the Sunday Amateur, Social and Masters divisions, while a Junior programme has been running since 2014.

After winning the league in the 2016 State League Division 1 it was announced that Joondalup would compete in the 2017 National Premier Leagues.

The club is an international partner of Celtic FC.

== Current squad ==
As of March 2020

Note: Flags indicate national team as defined under FIFA eligibility rules; some limited exceptions apply. Players may hold more than one non-FIFA nationality.

No.	Pos.	Nation	Player
3	DF	AUS	Scott Hoyle (captain)
4	DF	ENG	Gary Hill
6	MF	ENG	Josh Whitmore (vice captain)
8	MF	SCO	Jay Lang
9	FW	SCO	Jamie Stewart
10	FW	SCO	Jamie Gibson
12	FW	SCO	Craig Harrison

No.	Pos.	Nation	Player
14	DF	ENG	Liam Mooney
15	MF	ENG	Jamie Gardiner
16	MF	ENG	James Oldroyd
17	FW	AUS	Johnny Donga
20	DF	ENG	Samuel Faulkner
21	GK	AUS	Peter Stewart
23	DF	ENG	Oliver Cunningham
25	FW	ENG	Sean Kalaher

== Honours ==
- 2011 Amateur Cup Winners
- 2012 Amateur Premier League Winners
- 2014 State League Division 2 Winners
- 2015 State League Division 1 Reserves League Winners
- 2016 State League Division 1 Winners
- 2021 State League Division 1 Champions (Top four cup winner)
