= Wanneroo City SC =

Football club in Perth, Western Australia

Wanneroo City
- Full name: Wanneroo City Soccer Club
- Nickname: The Roos
- Founded: 1976
- Ground: Players Place, Kingsway Sporting Complex, Madeley
- President: Paul Thoroughgood
- Coach: Jason Winter (Head Coach), Kevin Flavin (Assistant Coach)
- League: State League 2
- 2025: 11th of 12 (relegated)
- Website: http://theroos.com.au/
Home colours	Away colours

Wanneroo City Soccer Club is an Australian semi-professional soccer club based in Madeley in the northern suburbs of Perth, Western Australia. The club currently competes in the Football West State League Division 2.

== History ==
The Wanneroo Soccer Club was formed in 1975 by parents from the Wanneroo Junior Soccer Club, and their home ground was on Scenic Drive in Wanneroo. They competed in the 2nd Division of the Amateur Soccer Association of WA, and stayed in the amateur ranks until the 1979 season, at which point they joined the 4th Division of the State League. They won the premiership and championship at the first attempt, and were promoted to the 3rd Division for the 1980 season.

In 1982 their home ground moved to the Wanneroo Showgrounds.

In 1983 they were runners-up and champions, gaining promotion to the 2nd division for the following year, assisted by their player/coach, ex-Southampton star John Sydenham. They stayed in the 2nd or 3rd Divisions for the next 20 years.

In 1986, the club moved to the Kingsway Sporting Complex in Landsdale (now Madeley).

The club's name was changed to Wanneroo British for the 1989–1995 seasons. The club merged with Perth City in 2003, and were called The City. They became Wanneroo City in 2004.

They won the 1st Division in 2005, gaining promotion to the Premier League for the first time, but they only lasted there for two seasons. They next won the 1st Division in 2013, but there was no promotion scenario that year, and they were not selected as one of the 12 initial teams in the newly formed National Premier Leagues WA for the 2014 season. The following year they came bottom of the league table, and were relegated to the WA State League Division 2 for the 2015 season.

== Rivalries ==
Wanneroo's main rivals are fellow Madeley based club Olympic Kingsway SC, as each clubs main playing ground is virtually separated by a single footpath, dividing each clubs' facilities from one another.
