= South West Phoenix FC =

Football club in Bunbury, Western Australia

South West Phoenix
- Full name: South West Phoenix Football Club
- Nickname: The Phoenix
- Founded: 2001
- Ground: Onside Sports Stadium, South Bunbury
- Capacity: 250
- President: Chris Norminton
- Manager: Matt Galea
- League: Amateur League Division 1
- 2023: 12th of 12 Amateur League Premier Division (Relegated)
- Website: http://www.swpfc.com.au
Home colours

South West Phoenix Football Club is an Australian semi-professional association football club based in Bunbury, Western Australia. The club will compete in 2023 in the Football West Amateur League Premier Division.

== History ==
The first club from the Bunbury region to join the Perth-based State League was Bunbury City FC from 1979 to 1987.

Bunbury Tricolore FC entered the State Amateur League in 1990, and participated there for the following 5 seasons. In 1996 they amalgamated with Ashfield to form Ashfield-Bunbury and entered the State League Division One; in 1999 this combined club won promotion to the Premier League after three seasons in Division One. The amalgamation with Ashfield was brought about mainly because of the costs involved in playing in the State League.

The club in its present form was founded in 2001 after the departure of Ashfield-Bunbury from the State League. The club's name came from a competition in the Bunbury-based newspaper The South-West Times. The club entered the WA State League Division 1 and finished 6th in their first season.

The club's name was changed to the Bunbury Forum Force in 2010, due to sponsorship arrangements, and they then won their first Division 1 title the year after in 2011, and therefore promoted to the WA Premier League for the 2012 season. In their two seasons in the Premier League they finished 9th and 7th, however they were not selected as one of the 12 initial teams in the newly formed National Premier Leagues WA for the 2014 season. In the 2015 season the club reverted to the name South West Phoenix FC after sponsorship arrangements expired.

In 2017 SWP won their first-ever Night Series Championship and were unbeaten throughout the whole tournament.

In February 2019, the squad suffered an embarrassing 3–5 defeat at the hands of local club Bunbury Dynamos in a friendly match. With goals from Chadley Edwards, Jack Menzies, Darcy Vane and Tererai Gwavava. About a week later Tony Novello resigned as the first-team coach.

On 15 March 2019, South West Phoenix officially asked Football West to be removed from the Football West State League Division 1. Football West accepted SWP request. Guy Italiano then resigned as president of the club.

South West Phoenix Won their first game in the SWSA Premier League with a 6–3 win away to local club Football Margaret River

At the end of the SWSA Premier League Season South West Phoenix finished the season 2nd on the ladder 9 points behind eventual league champions Bunbury Dynamos.

A Covid-19 interrupted season meant that 2020 was a not very competitive, as FW indicated no promotion or relegation for the season and as such, SWP found themselves using this time to rebuild following an exodus of players to local leagues.

South West Phoenix began the 2021 season under new leadership as the club looked to new Head Coach Nicky Carter and Assistant Coach Gareth Johnston to replace club stalwart Nigel Wilcox. Player recruitment went well for the club with an influx of players joining and returning as the club went on to claim the 2021 Night Series Championship going undefeated and beating North Perth United in the final.

Phoenix would go on to win the Football West Amateur Premier Division, after a thrilling 1-0 win against Kwinana United at home. Standout players such as Corey Barclay, Bright Ababio & goalkeeper Jamie Oakey helped Phoenix gain promotion in to State League Division 2 ahead of Maddington City.

== Coaching staff ==
- First Team Coach: Matt Galea
- First Team Assistant Coach:
- Reserve Coach:
- 17s Head Coach: Terry Willetts
- Technical Director: Nicky Carter

== Executive committee ==
- President – Chris Norminton
- Vice President – Stephen Suttie
- Treasurer – Marg Brand
- Secretary – Sally Brand
