= Dianella White Eagles SC =

Semi-pro fòotball club in Perth, Western Australia

Dianella White Eagles Soccer Club
- Full name: Dianella White Eagles Soccer Club
- Nicknames: Serbia, White Eagles
- Founded: 1978; 48 years ago
- Ground: Dianella Reserve
- Capacity: 1,500
- President: Branislav Maksimović
- Manager: John Lawrey (caretaker)
- League: NPL Western Australia
- 2026: 9th of 12
- Website: www.dwefc.com.au
Home colours	Away colours

Dianella White Eagles Soccer Club is an Australian semi-professional soccer club based in Perth. It was established by the local Serbian Australian community in 1978 as Dianella Serbia.

In 2025, the club will compete in the Football West State League Division 1 and winning their 2nd title in same year.

== History ==
The team was formed in 1978 under the name of Dianella Serbia. The name was changed to the current one in the 1990s due to FFA requirements at the time. The club has had success in winning the Division 1 title in 1993. That sent the team into Western Australia's highest division for a brief stint. Since then, the club has spent its time in Division 1 and came close to winning the league in 2013 and 2017.

== Club symbolism ==
The club's crest shows a soccer ball with a double headed eagle (the national emblem of Serbia) on a badge with the Serbian national colors of red, blue and white in the background. The club's song is called "Igrale se Delije".

== Rivalries ==
Dianella White Eagles have a fierce rivalry with Western Knights SC and Gwelup Croatia SC.

== Home ground ==
Dianella White Eagles' home ground is at Dianella Reserve, a public open space. The Dianella White Eagles share their ground with Little Athletics who use the ground during the summer months. The local Serbian community has built its own stand-alone clubroom next to the existing clubrooms.

== Players ==
As of January 2023

Note: Flags indicate national team as defined under FIFA eligibility rules; some limited exceptions apply. Players may hold more than one non-FIFA nationality.

No.	Pos.	Nation	Player
—	GK	AUS	Peter Pilkadris
—	GK	AUS	Joel Driscoll
—	DF	AUS	Lachlan Collins
—	DF	SEN	Magai Deng
—	DF	ESP	Franc Gamiz Quer
—	DF	AUS	Cory McNelis
—	DF	CHI	Francisco Caballero
—	DF	AUS	Alfie Wheeler
—	DF	IRL	Eoin Massey
—	MF	COL	Miguel Restrepo
—	MF	LBR	George Ballah

No.	Pos.	Nation	Player
—	MF	AUS	Kian McGuigan
—	MF	AUS	Paul Zimarino
—	MF	ENG	Sam Burgess
—	MF	IRL	Anthony Dolan
—	MF	AUS	Kieran Colwell
—	MF	AUS	Matt Worton
—	MF	AUS	Kristian Despotovski
—	FW	AUS	Saša Njegić (captain)
—	FW	AUS	Albert Luwi
—	FW	SCO	Gavin Byars
—	FW	AUS	Christian Belladonna

== Honours ==
- Football West State League Division 1
  - Winners (2): 1993, 2025
  - Runners-up (1): 2013
- Football West State League Division 2
  - Winners (1): 2021
  - Runners-up (1): 1990, 2020
- Football West State League Division 3
  - Runners-up (1): 1983
- Night Series Runners-up (1): 2015, 2024
- Karadjordjev Cup
  - Winners: 2012, 2017
  - JDL 3 U14 DWE Team, best junior team for DWE
  - Players
  - Cristian Saraceni 1 Hidden Player 2 Rehan Kothapally 3 Jordan Federico 4 Needup Paljor 5 Karma Yoebar 7 Leroy Li 8 James Edwin 10 Santiago Roldan 11 James Sandi 12 jace kallarackal joison 16 Karma Yoezen 17 Hidden Player 19 Mohamed Toure 21 sava zdrunkovic 22
