= Mandurah City FC =

Football club in Western Australia

Mandurah City
- Full name: Mandurah City Football Club
- Nickname: Dolphins
- Founded: 1970
- Ground: Poolmart Stadium
- Capacity: 3,000
- President: Gary Byrne (2024-Present)
- Manager: Zac Headington
- League: State League 1
- 2025: 7th of 12
- Website: http://www.mandurahcityfc.com.au/
Home colours

Mandurah City Football Club is an Australian professional football club based in Mandurah, Western Australia. Their home ground is Peelwood Reserve in Halls Head. The club has over 300 registered players which also includes Juniors, Social, Women, Semi-pro and Masters teams. They currently (2023) compete in the Football West State League Division 1.

== History ==
Founded in 1970, Mandurah City played their inaugural competitive season in the South West Soccer League, and won the league in 1972. The club then joined the Western Australian Amateur and Social Soccer Association (WASSA), where it remained until 2002. During this period in the amateurs, the club won the amateur championship in 1995 under the guidance of coach Jim Mayers.

In 2002, the club left the amateur ranks and joined the Western Australian Semi professional league and were crowned Division 1 champions in 2007, gaining promotion to the Premier League for the 2008 season. After four seasons in the top flight, the club was relegated after the 2011 season.

In 2013, the club unsuccessfully applied for entry into the National Premier Leagues Western Australia, and then entered into a rebuilding and restructuring phase. Doug Hesketh was appointed Director of Football and 1st team manager in 2015. Under the NPL structure, promotion and relegation was re-established for the 2016 season; Mandurah City were 2015 Division 1 Champions, but didn't meet all of the Football West eligibility criteria to be promoted. After coming second in the league in the 2016 State League Division 1 it was announced that Mandurah City would compete in the 2017 National Premier Leagues, but they only lasted in the top flight for a single season.

2020 started a fresh era for Mandurah City FC with the appointment of John Baird, a seasoned Scottish professional, as player, coach and director of football. Under his leadership the first team

== Home ground ==
The Club's home ground is Peelwood Reserve (known for sponsorship reasons as PoolMart Stadium), which is one of the premier football stadiums in the league. The venue has hosted a number of A-League friendly matches and the Singapore national team.

== Current squad ==
As of March 2022

Note: Flags indicate national team as defined under FIFA eligibility rules; some limited exceptions apply. Players may hold more than one non-FIFA nationality.

No.	Pos.	Nation	Player
1	GK	AUS	Preston Gilling
3	DF	ENG	Max Worswick
4	DF	AUS	Harry Collins (captain)
5	DF	AUS	Harrison Murray
6	MF	ENG	Ollie Fields
7	FW	NIR	Ben Gallagher
9	FW	ENG	Louie Evans
10	FW	ENG	Craig Barker
11	FW	ENG	Jimmy Waterman
12	MF	ENG	Jack Cossett-Greene
13	MF	SLV	Rodrigo Albayeros
14	DF	USA	Michael Mejia
15	FW	SCO	Donald McCallum
16	DF	AUS	Robbie Galvin
18	DF	AUS	Ste Hesketh

No.	Pos.	Nation	Player
19	DF	AUS	Sam Lovell
21	GK	NIR	Alfie Brincat (vice-captain)
23	MF	ENG	James Paylor
24	MF	ENG	Lewis Warnock
26	GK	FIJ	Ayush Chand
29	FW	SCO	John Baird
30	MF	IRL	Luke Desmond
32	FW	SCO	Gerry Clark
33	GK	ITA	Fernando Spadaccini
42	MF	SCO	Jordy Callaghan
44	MF	ENG	Jack Whittall
46	DF	SCO	Liam Bonner
60	GK	ITA	Riccardo Mazzoleni
—	FW	SCO	Liam Baxter
