= Floreat Athena FC =

Association football club in Perth, Western Australia

Floreat Athena
- Full name: Floreat Athena Football Club
- Nickname: Athena
- Founded: 1951; 75 years ago
- Ground: Litis Stadium
- Capacity: 5,000
- President: Sam Albanis (as of 2024)
- Coach: Alun Vernals -appointed (September 2025)
- League: State League 1
- 2025: 12th of 12 (relegated) NPL Western Australia
- Website: www.floreatathenafc.com.au
Home colours	Away colours

Floreat Athena Football Club is a soccer club based in Perth, Western Australia. The club competes in the National Premier Leagues Western Australia. The club's founders were of Greek heritage.

Floreat Athena has been crowned the Western Australian State Champions five times, League Premiers seven times, State Cup Winners eight times, and Night Series Champions nine times. In 1997, the club won all three trophies to claim its first ever treble.

== History ==
=== Early years ===
The club was formed in 1951 as the Athena Club by Greek-Australians as place for the local Greek community to unite around football. The club entered the third division of WA's state league football in 1953.

==== 1960s ====
In 1960 the club withdrew from the Western Australian Soccer Football Association (WASFA) to form WA's first official semi-professional league under the Western Australia Soccer Federation. It was also in 1960 that Athena played their first season in the state league's top tier, ending the season sixth and maintained its status in the top flight

The 1960s were turbulent times for Athena on the pitch. The club finished third in 1961 and 1963, but declined to just avoid relegation in subsequent years before being relegated in 1966 after finishing 9th in the State Premier League. Athena finished second in the 1967 Second Division season, gaining promotion to the State League for the 1968 season. In 1968 they were relegated for the second time in three years after they finished last.

==== 1970s ====
Athena remained in the First Division for five successive seasons (1969–1973). In 1973 Athena clinched the Second Division title and entered the top flight in 1974, finishing sixth. In the 1975 and 1976 seasons, Athena finished third. The club has finished no higher than third on four separate occasions since 1960.

In 1977, internal disputes at the committee level resulted in the sacking of coach Bill Dumbbell despite Athena claiming its first state league title. Athena maintained its status in the top flight until 1980 when the club was relegated for finishing tenth under coach Ulysses Kokkinos.

=== Golden era ===
After being relegated in 1980, the club secured its second First Division title in 1981 and returned to the top flight of Western Australia football (soccer). Since 1982, Floreat Athena has not been relegated, remaining in the State Premier League for three decades.

==== Mid 1980s – early 1990s – The Golden Years ====
From 1984 until 1991 Floreat Athena entered into a "golden era" of Western Australian Premier League football. After winning the Top Four Cup in 1984 Athena proceeded to win the Night Series trophy in 1985. Then from 1986, Athena were placed no lower than third for six straight seasons. Having finished third in 1986 and 1987, Athena claimed its second State Premier League title in 1988 under coach Ken Worden. Besides its great league achievements Athena also won the D'Orsogna Cup three consecutive seasons during this time.

The Soccer Federation changed the format of the championship to be based on a top four finals series for the 1989, 1990 and 1991 seasons. In each of these seasons, under coach Worden and then Alan Vest, Athena topped the State Premier League. The 1990 team finished the season unbeaten, a feat only three other teams have matched in WA history. However, they did not win the top four play-off finals in these seasons (being beaten by Perth Italia and Stirling Macedonia), and hence were not declared the champions despite their success in the league season.

==== The Treble (1997) ====
In 1997, under coach Jim Pyraglios, the club won a record treble of titles winning the Night Series, League Championship and Association Cup.

In 1999, they finished runners up to Inglewood in the Association Cup Final. In 2000, Athena won their fourth Night Series trophy. In 2001, Athena finished runners up in both the Association Cup Final and the Night Series Final to arch rival Perth Italia. In 2002, Athena again finished runners up to Perth Italia, this time in the State Premier League Championship.

==== Undefeated season (2007) ====
In the newly formed Football West, Floreat Athena was competing for their fourth State Premier League title. In 2004, a young squad was assembled under former Floreat Athena players Michael Roki and Taki Nicolaidis. Both players had been part of that 1990 side that went through the entire season undefeated.

After finishing the 2004 season in ninth position, Athena finished fifth in 2005 and fourth in 2006, climbing the ladder. Athena signed former Perth Glory defender Ante Kovacevic who was to prove instrumental in the 2007 season. Jerry Karpeh scored 25 goals and Josip Magdic played the wing. Captain Bajo Savic played his last game for Athena against Cockburn in a match that helped seal the title for Athena. Savic suffered a serious knee injury and subsequently never played again.

In the 2007 Football West Premier League season, Athena clinched the title undefeated with a 15-point gap over second place. There were several notable events during the season:

- James Isaia's 94th minute long range goal to draw the match against Fremantle Spirit,
- the 4–1 victory over rivals Perth SC at Dorrien Gardens,
- the 4–0 win over the Stirling Lions at Litis Stadium,
- the bicycle kick goal by Garin Collins on debut, and
- the last round against Armadale at Alfred Skeet Oval, where Athena found itself down 2–0 in the first 10 minutes, but rallied to win the match 5–3.

Being the fourth side in Western Australian State Premier League history to go through an entire season undefeated places Michael Roki and Taki Nicolaidis in the elite category of having played and coached Floreat Athena sides through undefeated seasons.

Following the 2007 season, Floreat Athena dominated almost all opposition but failed to bring home the trophies. The team finished the 2008 season without a title, having lost the Night Series final to arch rival Perth SC on penalties. Athena was to finish Runners up in the 2008 State Premier League to Sorrento whom they had beaten 9–3 on aggregate for the season. Floreat was again defeated by Perth SC in the 2009 Night Series final.

Floreat Athena managed to avenge the defeat Inglewood had inflicted upon them in the 1999 Association (Boral) Cup final by defeating them a decade later in the 2009 Association Cup final. Following the 2010 Night Series, Michael Roki decided it was time to retire due to work and family commitments.

Floreat Athena was taken over by player-coach Ante Kovacevic for the beginning of the 2010 Football West Premier League season. Athena finished a respectable 4th in the league and finished Runners up to the Stirling Lions in the 2010 Association Cup final.

=== 2011–2021 ===
It had been 11 years since Floreat Athena had been crowned Night Series champions. Ten players and management staff left at the end of the 2010 season. Coach Ante Kovacevic and assistant Taki Nicolaides assembled a fresh outfit that won the title in February 2011.

Floreat Athena finished the season at the top of their group, dispatching Armadale and Forrestdale 3–1, and drawing to Inglewood 2–2 with goals coming from Liam Boland, Garin Collins, James Isaia and Danny Trevisol. All three games being played at Alfred Skeet Reserve.

The quarter final against Sorrento was played at Athena's home ground, Litis Stadium. New recruit Dave Houston scored a goal in the 91st minute to set up a semi-final appearance.

The semi-final against Cockburn City was played at 6PR Stadium. Athena went a goal down in the early stages of the first half but Liam Boland scored a goal back. Cockburn defender Paul Natale was sent off in the first half and Floreat Athena took the lead. Early in the second half, Boland scored his second of the game. Garin Collins then added a further two goals to make the score 4–1 and put Athena into another Night Series Grand Final.

Saturday, 19 February 2011, Floreat Athena faced ECU Joondalup at Dorrien Gardens. In the 68th minute, a goal attempt by the right wing by Jack Allen was stopped by the ECU goalkeeper, however Liam Boland scored a goal from three yards. With 15 minutes remaining, a challenge on Athena goalkeeper Alex Dunn forced the no. 1 to leave the field with a head injury. Replacement goalkeeper Simon Madaschi took his place, making several saves in the remaining minutes to hold ECU at bay. The final score was 1–0.

The club had its maiden FFA Cup appearance in 2016, when it qualified for the competition proper at the Round of 32 stage, drawing A-League club Melbourne City FC.

=== 2022-present (NPL Premiers and Night series double, relegation and immediate promotion) ===
The club returned to the top of Western Australian football in the 2022 season, winning the Night Series and the League to complete the double, the club's first since 1977. After giving up a 2-0 lead against Armadale SC on the final matchday of the season, it seemed Perth RedStar FC would overtake Floreat to clinch the league, but in the dying minutes of the game, Bayley Brown-Montgomery found the back of the net to make it 3-2 and win the league at the last minute. Floreat began their Top 4 Cup campaign against Perth RedStar FC in the hopes of completing a Night Series, League and Top 4 Cup treble. After dispatching of Perth RedStar 2-1 in the Semi-Finals, Floreat advanced straight to the Grand Final, where they took on Perth RedStar once more. After being up 2-0 with only 20 minutes remaining, it seemed certain Floreat would crown themselves champions and complete their treble, but a remarkable comeback saw Perth RedStar win 3-2, with Daryl Nicol finding the winner for RedStar deep into stoppage time.

In the 2024 season, Floreat finished sixth on 33 points after a six point deduction (three suspended) for breaches of the codes of conduct and spectator code of behaviour. Athena would have finished within the Top 4 and contested the 2024 Top 4 Cup if they were not sanctioned- their place was taken by rivals Stirling Macedonia FC.

The 2025 season was a disastrous one for the Greek club. A winless season and only six points saw the club relegated from the top flight for the first time since 1980. They played the 2026 season in the WA State League 1, beginning their season optimistically by winning the State League Night Series, defeating Inglewood United FC 4-1 in the final. Floreat would go on to win promotion back immediately, winning the State League 1 with one game remaining after a 2-1 win over Mandurah City FC. They will compete in the NPL again in 2027.

== Crest and colours ==
=== Club crest and the Goddess Athena ===
Both the club shield and the Goddess Athena feature on all Floreat Athena merchandise. Playing strips have always carried both emblems. The club shield has blue and white stripes and a football placed in the middle, signifying both the heritage and purpose of the club.

The Goddess is the club's original namesake and features heavily on its merchandise and uniforms. Unlike other clubs with an ethnic past, Athena was allowed to keep its name following the implementation of the National Club Identity Policy because it is essentially non-ethnic. Although the goddess Athena is a Greek Goddess, she is not an explicit reference to an ethnicity such as Stirling Macedonia, or Gwelup Croatia, and therefore was allowed.

=== Colours ===
Floreat Athena "home" colours are blue and white stripes. Away strips have generally tended to be all white. However, this current format was not the original strip. In 1953, Athena had a predominantly blue strip with a white block 'V' topped off with a blue collar. Floreat Athena used a replica heritage strip in the 2011 season as it is the club's 60th Anniversary. Blue and white has significance as the majority of people who founded the club came from Greece.

== Stadium ==
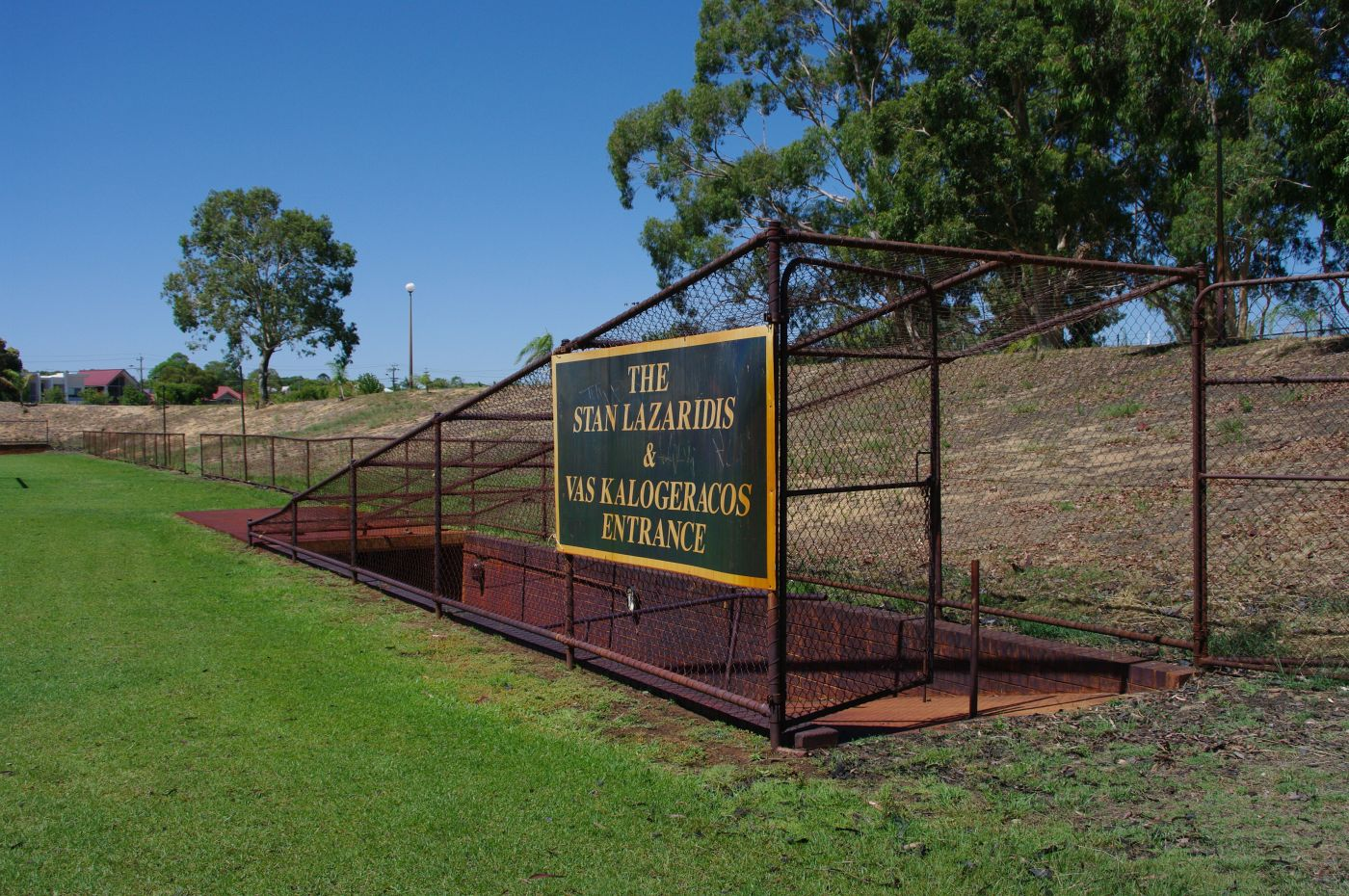
The Stan Lazaridis and Vas Kalogeracos tunnel

Athena's first home was at Wellington Square in East Perth. The club later played at Perry Lakes Stadium in Floreat, leading to the addition of Floreat to the club's name.

The club has played at Litis Stadium, formerly the Lake Monger Velodrome, in Mount Hawthorn since 1985. There are currently two grandstands, the Eleni grandstand and a more modern stand in front of the clubrooms which was built 20 years ago.

However the Eleni grandstand, a relic of the former velodrome, is due to be demolished and new changerooms built in its place.

A cycling tunnel had been left intact for players to use to and from the change rooms and was a feature of the ground, however due to neglect it has been deemed unsafe and is currently locked up. The old change rooms that the tunnel led to were demolished in 2019.

The tunnel was named after two famous Athena players: Stan Lazaridis and Vas Kalogeracos.

== Support ==
Floreat Athena enjoys support from the Greek-Australian community though this has dropped in recent years. The current average attendance at Litis Stadium is between 300 and 500 people per match. This is a far cry from the 5,000 – 10,000 that would regularly attend matches in the early years. Local Greek-Australian businesses contribute in the form of sponsorship on an annual basis. Many affluent Greek-Australian families have donated to the club, helping Floreat Athena become a mainstay in top flight and junior football.

== Club Coaching Staff ==
First Team Head Coach:	TBC
First Team Assistant Coach:	TBC
First Team Manager:	TBC
Technical Director:	Mark Jones
Club Physio:	TBC

== Current squad ==
As of 26 March 2025

Note: Flags indicate national team as defined under FIFA eligibility rules; some limited exceptions apply. Players may hold more than one non-FIFA nationality.

No.	Pos.	Nation	Player
1	GK	AUS	Jason Saldaris
2	MF	SCO	Cameron Murray
3	DF	AUS	Ali Mohamed
4	MF	GRE	John Lardis
5	MF	PNG	Ethan Mom
6	MF	GUI	Cherno Bah
8	MF	SCO	Kyle Murray
9	FW	ENG	James Simms
10	FW	AUS	Abraham Mathet
11	MF	AUS	Ajang Yuot
12	FW	AUS	Egide Ngendakumana
13	FW	AUS	Zach Crawford
14	FW	AUS	Jack Sprigg
15	FW	AUS	Chris Saldaris

No.	Pos.	Nation	Player
16	MF	AUS	Daniel Khan
17	MF	AUS	Raul Pereira
18	MF	AUS	Hasen Asadi
19	DF	AUS	Mohamed Al-Zaidy
20	GK	AUS	Noah Kanzi
21	DF	AUS	Moustafa Mohamed
23	MF	AUS	Josh Hunter
24	DF	AUS	Majok Mayen
25	MF	AUS	Bala Noah Shamaki

== Honours ==
Joined state league: 1960

Seasons in Semi-Professional State League: 1960–1966, 1968, 1974–1980, 1982–2025

State League Championships
Winners: 5 (1977, 1988, 1997, 2007, 2022)
Runners up: 7 (1989, 1991, 1993, 2002, 2008, 2012, 2021)

Top Four/Five Cup Grand Final
Winners: 4 (1975, 1984, 1988, 2020)
Runners up: 4 (1986, 2001, 2002, 2021, 2022)

State Cup
Winners: 9 (1987, 1988, 1989, 1997, 2009, 2016, 2019, 2021, 2023)
Runners up: 4 (1984, 1999, 2001, 2010)

League Night Series
Winners: 9 (1977, 1985, 1997, 2000, 2011, 2015, 2018, 2019, 2022)
Runners up: 9 (1987, 1988, 1989, 1992, 1994, 2001, 2008, 2009, 2014)

First Division
Winners: 2 (1973, 1981)
Runners up: 1 (1967)

Doubles:
League & Night Series: 2 (1977, 2022)

Treble:
League, Association Cup & Top Four: 1 (1988)
League, Association Cup & Night Series: 1 (1997)

Gold Medal Winners:
1963: J. Montagu
1979: Vince Alcock
1988: Jeff Curran
1989: Jeff Curran
1990: John Hunter
2015: Ludovic Boi
2020: Dean Evans

Top Goal Scorer:
1988: Paul Wormley
1990: John Hunter
1997: Michael Roki
2007: Boima Karpeh

== Seasons ==
=== 1960–present ===
Season	League statistics											Cup results		
Season	League	Tier	Pld	W	D	L	GF	GA	GD	Pts	Pos	NS	Cup	Top 4
1960	WASF	1	14	3	4	7	21	32	-11	10	6	N/A	N/A	N/A
1961	WASF	1	18	9	3	6	35	28	7	21	3	N/A	N/A	N/A
1962	WASF	1	18	8	4	6	36	30	6	20	5	N/A	N/A	N/A
1963	WASF	1	18	10	4	4	35	18	17	24	3	N/A	N/A	N/A
1964	SFWA	1	18	6	4	8	37	52	-15	16	8	N/A	N/A	N/A
1965	SFWA	1	18	7	2	9	36	41	-5	16	8	N/A	N/A	N/A
1966	SFWA	1	18	4	4	10	29	43	-14	11*	9	N/A	N/A	N/A
1967	SFWA	2	16	10	5	1	46	25	21	25	2	N/A	N/A	N/A
1968	SFWA	1	18	2	5	11	26	59	-23	9	10	N/A	N/A	N/A
1969	SFWA	2	18	8	2	8	51	37	14	18	6	N/A	N/A	N/A
1970	SFWA	2	18	6	3	9	48	59	-11	15	7	N/A	N/A	N/A
1971	SFWA	2	26	5	4	17	47	83	-36	14	12	N/A	N/A	N/A
1972	SFWA	2	26	13	6	7	67	46	21	32	4	N/A	N/A	N/A
1973	SFWA	2	18	15	1	2	58	23	25	31	1	N/A	N/A	N/A
1974	SFWA	1	18	7	4	7	25	32	-7	18	6	N/A	N/A	N/A
1975	SFWA	1	18	8	5	5	38	32	6	21	3	N/A	N/A	1
1976	SFWA	1	18	8	5	5	35	29	6	21	3	GS	QF	3
1977	SFWA	1	18	11	3	4	38	19	19	25	1	1	-	N/A
1978	SFWA	1	18	10	4	4	37	17	20	24	3	N/A	-	N/A
1979	SFWA	1	18	3	7	8	26	36	-10	13	8	GS	R2	DNQ
1980	SFWA	1	18	4	2	12	18	38	-20	10	10	GS	R1	DNQ
1981	SFWA	2	22	17	4	1	55	18	37	38	1	DNQ	R1	DNQ
1982	SFWA	1	22	8	7	7	43	42	1	31	7	GS	QF	DNQ
1983	SFWA	1	22	5	4	13	22	50	-28	19	10	GS	R1	DNQ
1984	SFWA	1	22	11	6	5	41	26	15	39	3	GS	2	1
1985	SFWA	1	22	8	6	8	40	37	3	30	6	1	SF	N/A
1986	SFWA	1	22	14	5	3	52	27	25	47	3	SF	QF	2
1987	SFWA	1	22	11	7	4	54	29	25	40	3	2	1	3
1988	SFWA	1	21	11	6	4	62	37	25	39	1	N/A	1	1
1989	SFWA	1	21	15	3	3	58	20	38	48	1*	N/A	1	2*
1990	SFWA	1	18	17	1	0	71	16	55	52	1*	N/A	R1	3*
1991	PSL	1	20	13	3	4	40	17	23	29	1*	N/A	R1	2*
1992	PSL	1	20	7	7	6	35	23	12	21	5	N/A	R1	5
1993	PSFWA	1	26	18	3	5	79	37	42	39	2	N/A	R1	3
1994	PSFWA	1	22	14	2	6	59	35	24	28*	3	N/A	R1	3
1995	PSFWA	1	18	6	2	10	34	47	-13	20	7	N/A	R1	DNQ
1996	SWC	1	18	5	6	7	29	34	-5	21	6	N/A	R1	DNQ
1997	SWC	1	26	17	7	2	70	30	40	58	1	1	1	N/A
1998	SWC	1	22	11	3	8	39	37	2	36	5	SF	R3	5
1999	SWC	1	22	11	4	7	52	40	12	37	4	2	2	5
2000	SWC	1	22	9	1	12	40	45	-5	28	9	1	R2	DNQ
2001	SWC	1	18	9	3	6	34	24	10	30	3	2	2	2
2002	SWC	1	22	14	4	4	47	32	15	46	2	GS	QF	2
2003	SWC	1	20	7	6	7	28	26	2	27	6	SF	R2	DNQ
2004	SWC	1	22	5	7	10	29	44	-15	22	9	SF	R1	DNQ
2005	FWPL	1	22	11	2	9	41	36	5	35	5	GS	R2	N/A
2006	FWPL	1	22	12	2	8	49	29	20	38	4	3	QF	N/A
2007	FWPL	1	22	18	4	0	70	28	42	58	1	SF	QF	N/A
2008	FWPL	1	22	15	3	5	47	27	20	45	2	2	QF	SF
2009	FWPL	1	22	11	4	7	44	38	6	37	3	2	1	3
2010	FWPL	1	22	10	6	6	44	29	15	36	4	QF	2	4
2011	FWPL	1	22	7	5	10	34	41	-7	26	8	1	R2	DNQ
2012	FWPL	1	22	13	5	4	64	34	30	44	2	QF	SF	2
2013	FWPL	1	22	9	6	7	39	39	0	33	5	QF	R2	N/A
2014	NPLWA	1	22	10	1	11	47	46	1	31	7	2	QF	N/A
2015	NPLWA	1	22	15	3	4	61	34	27	48	3	1	R4	N/A
2016	NPLWA	1	22	11	5	6	50	32	18	38	4	SF	1	N/A
2017	NPLWA	1	26	14	5	7	42	31	11	47	5	TBC	R4	N/A
2018	NPLWA	1	26	12	5	9	53	43	10	41	7	TBC	SF	N/A
2019	NPLWA	1	22	11	4	7	48	37	11	37	3	TBC	1	N/A
2020	NPLWA	1	22	11	4	7	48	37	11	37	3	TBC	1	N/A
2021	NPLWA	1	22	13	5	4	48	27	21	44	2	GS	1	2
2022	NPLWA	1	22	14	5	3	54	35	19	47	1	1	R3	2
2023	NPLWA	1	22	8	3	11	29	34	-5	27	10	GS	1	DNQ
2024	NPLWA	1	22	11	3	8	43	33	10	33*	6	GS	R3	DNQ
2025	NPLWA	1	22	0	6	16	23	51	-28	6	12	GS	R4	DNQ

=== Key ===
- Competitions:
  - NPLWA – National Premier League Western Australia
  - FFA Cup – Football Federation Australia Cup
  - WASF – Western Australian Soccer Federation
  - SFWA – Soccer Federation of Western Australia
  - PSL – Professional Soccer League
  - PSFWA – Professional Soccer Federation of Western Australia
  - SWC – Soccer West Coast
- Other:
  - N/A – Not applicable; competition yet to be founded or not held
  - DNE – Did not enter
  - DNQ – Did not qualify
  - GS – Group Stage
  - Pre, R1, R2, R3, R4, R5, R of 32, R of 16, QF, SF, RU, W – Tournament placing
- Background colours:
  - Gold – Winners
  - Silver – Runners-up
  - Red – Relegated
  - Green – Promoted

Notes:

- 1966 Season West Perth Athena was deducted 1 point by SFWA
- 1989 Season: State champions decided by Top Four Finals Series
- 1990 Season: State champions decided by Top Five Finals Series
- 1991 Season: State champions decided by Top Five Finals Series
- 1994 Season: Floreat Athena deducted 2 points by PSL
- 2024 Season: Floreat Athena deducted 3 points by Football West

== Notable past players ==
List includes players from Floreat Athena youth or senior teams that have gone on to represent the Australian national team, or have amassed over 100 games with Perth Glory FC.

- Bobby Despotovski (also has the all-time goal-scoring record with Perth Glory FC), for Australia
- Stan Lazaridis, for Australia
- Vasilios (Vas) Kalogeracos, for Australia

Past players who have represented the national sides of other countries include:

- Alan Ball Jr. for England
- Ross Greer, for Hong Kong (in both soccer and cricket)
- Brad Scott, for New Zealand at 2000 Merdeka Tournament
- Adrian Sutton, for New Zealand at 2000 Merdeka Tournament

== Affiliated clubs ==
- South Melbourne FC
