= 2016 FFA Cup preliminary rounds =

Qualification rounds for 2016 season of Australian soccer competition

Tournament details
- Country: Australia
- Teams: 704

The 2016 FFA Cup preliminary rounds were the qualifying competition in Australia to decide 21 of the 32 teams which took part in the 2016 FFA Cup Round of 32, along with the 10 A-League clubs and reigning National Premier Leagues champion (Blacktown City FC). The preliminary rounds operated within a consistent national structure whereby club entry into the competition was staggered in each state/territory, with the winning clubs from Round 7 of the preliminary rounds in each member federation gaining entry into the Round of 32. All Australian clubs were eligible to enter the qualifying process through their respective FFA member federation, however only one team per club was permitted entry in the competition.

== Schedule ==
The number of fixtures for each round, and the match dates for each Federation, were as follows.

Round	Number of fixtures	Clubs	ACT	NSW	NNSW	NT	QLD	SA	TAS	VIC	WA
Qualifying round	22 + 6 byes	704 → 682	–	–	–	–	–	–	–	20–21 Feb	–
First round	60 + 7 byes	682 → 622	–	–	27–28 Feb	–	27 Feb	–	–	27–29 Feb	27–28 Feb
Second round	122 + 11 byes	622 → 500	–	–	12 Feb–13 Mar	–	12 Feb–12 Mar	18–20 Mar	–	4–7 Mar	6–13 Mar
Third round	180 + 24 byes	500 → 320	26–28 Apr	16–21 Mar	13 Feb–6 Apr	–	26 Feb–29 Mar	1–6 Apr	5 Mar	11–14 Mar	19–20 Mar
Fourth round	145 + 4 byes	320 → 175	10–19 May	3–13 Apr	5 Mar–4 May	19–27 Apr	24 Mar–12 Apr	25 Apr	12–14 Mar	18–21 Mar	28 Mar
Fifth round	80 + 4 byes	175 → 95	31 May–2 Jun	19–25 Apr	2 Apr–21 May	3–4 May	16 Apr–4 May	28 May–1 Jun	28 Mar	19 Apr–4 May	25 Apr
Sixth round	42	95 → 53	7–9 Jun	3–4 May	18 Jun	8 Jun	7–18 May	14–15 Jun	30 Apr	17 May–8 Jun	14 May
Seventh round	21	53 → 32	18 Jun	18 May	19 Jun	18 Jun	3–11 Jun	25 Jun	13 Jun	7–15 Jun	6 Jun

- Round dates in the respective Federations overlapped due to separate scheduling of geographic zones.

== Format ==
The preliminary rounds structures are as follows, and refer to the different levels in the unofficial Australian soccer league system :

- Qualifying round:

- 50 Victorian clubs level 8 and below entered this stage.

- Byes – 6 VIC clubs.

- First round:

- 11 Northern New South Wales clubs level 4 and below entered this stage.
- 10 Queensland clubs entered this stage.
- 88 Victorian clubs (22 from the previous round and 66 level 6–8) entered this stage.
- 18 Western Australian level 6 and below entered this stage.

- Second round:

- 63 Northern New South Wales clubs (6 from the previous round and 57 level 3 and below) entered this stage.
- 71 Queensland clubs (8 from the previous round and 63 level 3 and below) entered this stage. The Brisbane-based losers from this round also qualified to the First Round of the linked Canale Cup competition.
- 16 South Australian clubs level 4 and below entered at this stage.
- 80 Victorian clubs (44 from the previous round and 36 level 5–6) entered this stage.
- 22 Western Australian clubs (9 from the previous round and 13 level 5 and below) entered this stage.

- Third round:

- 11 Australian Capital Territory clubs level 3–4 entered this stage.
- 108 New South Wales clubs level 4 and below entered this stage.
- 45 Northern New South Wales clubs (32 from the previous round and 13 level 2 and below) entered this stage.
- 75 Queensland clubs (38 from the previous round and 37 new teams) entered this stage.
- 9 Northern Territory clubs level 2 and below from the Norzone (DAR) entered at this stage.
- 32 South Australian clubs (9 from the previous round and 23 level 2–3) entered this stage.
- 6 Tasmanian clubs level 3 entered at this stage
- 64 Victorian clubs (40 from the previous round and 24 level 4) entered this stage.
- 34 Western Australian clubs (11 from the previous round and 23 level 3–4) entered this stage.

- Fourth round:

- 16 Australian Capital Territory clubs (8 from the previous round and 8 level 2) entered this stage.
- 80 New South Wales clubs (58 from the previous round and 22 level 2 and below) entered this stage.
- 24 Northern New South Wales clubs progressed to this stage.
- 13 Northern Territory clubs (8 from the previous round and 5 level 2 and below from the Southern Zone (ASP)) entered at this stage.
- 43 Queensland clubs (38 from the previous round and 5 new teams) entered this stage. The 10 Brisbane-based winners also qualify to the Fifth Round of the separate Canale Cup competition.
- 16 South Australian clubs progressed to this stage.
- 16 Tasmanian clubs (3 from the previous round and 13 level 2–3) entered at this stage.
- 64 Victorian clubs (32 from the previous round and 32 level 2–3) entered this stage.
- 24 Western Australian clubs (17 from the previous round and 7 level 2) entered this stage.

- Fifth round:

- 8 Australian Capital Territory clubs progressed to this stage.
- 40 New South Wales clubs progressed to this stage.
- 12 Northern New South Wales clubs progressed to this stage.
- 8 Northern Territory clubs will progress to this stage.
- 32 Queensland clubs (21 from the previous round and 11 level 2) entered this stage.
- 8 South Australian clubs progressed to this stage.
- 8 Tasmanian clubs progressed to this stage.
- 32 Victorian clubs progressed to this stage.
- 16 Western Australian clubs (12 from the previous round and 4 level 2) entered this stage.

- Sixth round:

- 4 Australian Capital Territory clubs progressed to this stage.
- 20 New South Wales clubs progressed to this stage.
- 8 Northern New South Wales clubs progressed to this stage.
- 4 Northern Territory clubs progressed to this stage.
- 16 Queensland clubs progressed to this stage.
- 4 South Australian clubs progressed to this stage.
- 4 Tasmanian clubs progressed to this stage.
- 16 Victorian clubs progressed to this stage.
- 8 Western Australian clubs progressed to this stage.

- Seventh round:

- 2 Australian Capital Territory clubs progressed to this stage, which doubled as the Final of the Federation Cup.
- 10 New South Wales clubs progressed to this stage. The 5 winners – along with the reigning National Premier Leagues champion Blacktown City – also participated in the Waratah Cup.
- 4 Northern New South Wales clubs progressed to this stage.
- 2 Northern Territory clubs progressed to this stage – the winners of the Darwin-based and Alice Springs-based knockout competitions – which doubled as the final of the Sport Minister's Cup.
- 8 Queensland clubs progressed to this stage.
- 2 South Australian clubs progressed to this stage, which doubled as the Grand Final of the Federation Cup.
- 2 Tasmanian clubs progressed to this stage, which doubled as the Grand Final of the Milan Lakoseljac Cup.
- 8 Victorian clubs progressed to this stage. The 4 winners also qualified to the semi-finals of the Dockerty Cup.
- 4 Western Australian clubs progressed to this stage. The 2 winners also played in the Final of the Cool Ridge Cup.

=== Other qualification issues ===
- A-League Youth teams playing in their respective state leagues were specifically excluded from the preliminary rounds as their respective Senior A-League clubs were already part of the competition.
- Blacktown City did not participate in the New South Wales qualifying rounds, as they had already qualified into the FFA Cup as 2015 National Premier Leagues champions.

== Key to abbreviations ==
Federation	Zone
ACT = Australian Capital Territory	
NSW = New South Wales	
NNSW = Northern New South Wales	FNC = Far North Coast; MNC = Mid North Coast; NC = North Coast; NI = Northern Inland; NTH = North (generally); STH = South
NT = Northern Territory	ASP = Alice Springs; DAR = Darwin
QLD = Queensland	BNE = Brisbane; CQ = Central Queensland; FNQ = Far North Queensland; GC = Gold Coast; MRF = Mackay Regional Football; NQ = North Queensland; SC = Sunshine Coast; SQL = South Queensland (generally); SWQ = South West Queensland; WB = Wide Bay
SA = South Australia	
TAS = Tasmania	
VIC = Victoria	
WA = Western Australia	MW = Mid West; SW = South West

== Qualifying round ==
Fed	Zone	Tie no	Home team (Tier)	Score	Away team (Tier)
Victoria
VIC	–	1	Gisborne SC (8)	0–2	Cleeland United (9)
VIC	–	2	Albert Park (8)	4–1	Keon Park (8)
VIC	–	3	Meadow Park (8)	0–3	Laverton Park (8)
VIC	–	4	Glen Waverley (8)	0–4	Baxter SC (8)
VIC	–	5	White Star Dandenong (8)	2–1	Parkmore SC (8)
VIC	–	6	Cobram Roar (9)	1–2	Mitchell Rangers (8)
VIC	–	7	Melbourne Lions (8)	w/o	Montrose SC (8)
VIC	–	8	Golden Plains (8)	0–2	Wangaratta City (9)
VIC	–	9	Kyneton District (8)	1–3	RMIT FC (8)
VIC	–	10	Rosebud Heart (8)	5–1	Thornbury Athletic (8)
VIC	–	11	Lilydale Eagles (8)	w/o	Old Mentonians (8)

Fed	Zone	Tie no	Home team (Tier)	Score	Away team (Tier)
VIC	–	12	Churchill United (9)	2–1†	East Bentleigh (8)
VIC	–	13	Myrtleford Savoy (9)	3–2	Old Trinity Grammarians (8)
VIC	–	14	Forest Rangers (9)	1–9	Dandenong Warriors (8)
VIC	–	15	Monash City (8)	2–0	Chelsea FC (8)
VIC	–	16	Ballarat North United (9)	1–6	Swinburne University (8)
VIC	–	17	Heidelberg Eagles (8)	0–2	Lara United (8)
VIC	–	18	Twin City Wanderers (9)	4–0	Pakenham United (8)
VIC	–	19	Casey Panthers (8)	0–5	North Melbourne Athletic (8)
VIC	–	20	Sandown Lions (8)	w/o	Yarra Jets (8)
VIC	–	21	Keilor Wolves (8)	w/o	Healesville SC (8)
VIC	–	22	Mt Lilydale Old Collegians (8)	3–2	Greenvale United (8)

Notes:

- w/o = Walkover
- † = After Extra Time
- VIC Byes – Chisholm United (8), Craigieburn City (8), Moreland Eagles (8), Old Ivanhoe Grammarians (8), Reservoir Yeti (8) and Shepparton South (9).

== First round ==
Fed	Zone	Tie no	Home team (Tier)	Score	Away team (Tier)
Northern New South Wales
NNSW	NC	1	Grafton United (5)	2–2†	Nambucca Strikers (5)
Nambucca Strikers advance 5–4 on penalties.
NNSW	NC	2	Boambee FC (4)	0–4	Urunga FC (4)
NNSW	NC	3	Maclean FC (4)	0–1	Coffs Coast Tigers (4)
NNSW	NC	4	Sawtell Scorpions (4)	0–5	Northern Storm Thunder (4)
NNSW	NC	5	Coffs City United (4)	11–0	Westlawn Tigers (4)
Queensland
QLD	SC	6	Caloundra FC (3)	4–1	Noosa Lions (3)
QLD	SC	7	Buderim Wanderers (3)	6–4	Gympie Diggers (3)
Victoria
VIC	–	8	Altona North (7)	0–0†	Epping City (7)
Epping City advance 5–4 on penalties.
VIC	–	9	Hampton Park United Sparrows (7)	5–3†	Albert Park (8)
VIC	–	10	Dandenong South (7)	4–5†	Myrtleford Savoy (9)
VIC	–	11	Moreland Eagles (8)	6–0	Melbourne Lions (8)
VIC	–	12	Balmoral FC (7)	1–7	Geelong Rangers (6)
VIC	–	13	Eltham Redbacks (6)	2–0	Monash University (7)
VIC	–	14	Shepparton South (9)	4–0	Monash City (8)
VIC	–	15	Upfield SC (6)	4–2	Harrisfield Hurricanes (7)
VIC	–	16	Endeavour United (7)	2–3	Middle Park (6)
VIC	–	17	Skye United (7)	3–1	Mt Lilydale Old Collegians (8)
VIC	–	18	Strathmore Split (7)	4–2	Springvale City (7)
VIC	–	19	Laverton Park (8)	0–2	Carey EFC (7)
VIC	–	20	Ashburton United (6)	0–7	Twin City Wanderers (9)
VIC	–	21	Point Cook (7)	7–0	Churchill United (-)
VIC	–	22	Noble Park (7)	0–9	Melton Phoenix (7)
VIC	–	23	Keysborough SC (7)	4–2	Darebin United (6)
VIC	–	24	Craigieburn City (8)	2–5	St Kevins Old Boys (7)
VIC	–	25	Lyndale United (7)	3–1	White Star Dandenong (8)
VIC	–	26	Riversdale SC (6)	3–1†	Bayside Argonauts (7)
VIC	–	27	Dandenong Warriors (8)	w/o	Plenty Valley Lions (7)
VIC	–	28	Brunswick Zebras (7)	1–2	Bell Park (7)
VIC	–	29	Elwood City (7)	3–2†	Mitchell Rangers (8)

Fed	Zone	Tie no	Home team (Tier)	Score	Away team (Tier)	
VIC	–	30	Reservoir Yeti (8)	2–3†	Cleeland United (9)	
VIC	–	31	Yarra Jets (8)	2–3	Truganina Hornets (7)	
VIC	–	32	Endeavour Hills Fire (7)	3–2	Sebastopol Vikings (7)	
VIC	–	33	Ringwood City (7)	3–4†	Spring Hills (7)	
VIC	–	34	West Preston (7)	3–1	Watsonia Heights (7)	
VIC	–	35	Baxter SC (8)	2–3	Lalor United (6)	
VIC	–	36	Lara United (8)	0–4	Collingwood City (7)	
VIC	–	37	Bundoora United (7)	w/o	Fawkner SC (6)	
VIC	–	38	Surf Coast (7)	1–2	Melbourne City (6)	
VIC	–	39	Old Ivanhoe Grammarians (8)	2–0	Mill Park (7)	
VIC	–	40	Brimbank Stallions (7)	3–0	Chisholm United (8)	
VIC	–	41	Rosebud Heart (8)	2–4	Whitehorse United (7)	
VIC	–	42	Old Camberwell Grammarians (7)	0–1	RMIT FC (8)	
VIC	–	43	Old Xaverians (7)	1–3	Maribyrnong Greens (7)	
VIC	–	44	Swinburne University (8)	1–3	Brighton SC (6)	
VIC	–	45	Brandon Park (7)	1–2	Northern Falcons (7)	
VIC	–	46	Croydon City Arrows (6)	3–3†	Healesville SC (8)	
Croydon City Arrows advance 4–2 on penalties.
VIC	–	47	Rowville Eagles (7)	4–2	Waverley Wanderers (7)	
VIC	–	48	Marcellin Old Collegians (7)	3–0	East Brighton United (7)	
VIC	–	49	Kings Domain (7)	2–4	Wangaratta City (9)	
VIC	–	50	Newmarket Phoenix (7)	w/o	North City Wolves (7)	
VIC	–	51	Old Mentonians (8)	0–2	North Melbourne Athletic (8)	
Western Australia
WA	SW	–	52	Bunbury Dynamos (5)	5–0	Eaton Dardanup (6)
WA	SW	–	53	Margaret River (5)	7–0	Busselton SC (5)
WA	SW	–	54	Geographe Bay (6)	w/o	Bunbury United (5)
WA	MW	–	55	Olympic Heat (5)	w/o	Geraldton Rovers (5)
WA	–	56	East Fremantle Tricolore (11)	9–1	Tuart Hill (13)	
WA	–	57	Liberties FC (9)	w/o	Kwinana United (6)	
WA	–	58	Backpackers FC (7)	8–0	Western United (10)	
WA	–	59	Maccabi (6)	1–2	Jaguar FC (6)	
WA	–	60	Ballajura AFC (7)	3–1	Koondoola Red Falcons (12)	

Notes:

- w/o = Walkover
- † = After Extra Time
- NNSW Byes – Orara Valley (4).
- QLD Byes – Beerwah Glasshouse United (3), Coolum FC (3), Kawana FC (3), Maroochydore FC (3), Nambour Yandina (3) and Woombye FC (3).

== Second round ==
Fed	Zone	Tie no	Home team (Tier)	Score	Away team (Tier)
Northern New South Wales
NNSW	NI	1	Norths United (4)	8–0	North Companions (4)
NNSW	NI	2	Demon Knights (4)	1–7	Oxley Vale Attunga (4)
NNSW	NI	3	South Armidale United (4)	3–1	The Armidale School (5)
NNSW	NC	4	Nambucca Strikers (5)	0–17	Urunga FC (4)
NNSW	NC	5	Coffs Coast Tigers (4)	4–1	Northern Storm Thunder (4)
NNSW	NC	6	Coffs City United (4)	8–1	Orara Valley (4)
NNSW	FNC	7	Lismore Thistles (4)	w/o	Mullumbimby Brunswick Valley (5)
NNSW	FNC	8	Ballina SC (5)	1–2	Suffolk Park (5)
NNSW	FNC	9	Bangalow SC (4)	4–1	Lennox Head (5)
NNSW	STH	10	RAAF Williamtown (7)	1–9	Hunter Simba (6)
NNSW	STH	11	Hamilton Azzurri (6)	3–2	Barnsley United (5)
NNSW	STH	12	Dudley Redhead Junior (7)	1–2	Muswellbrook FC (6)
NNSW	STH	13	Mayfield United Senior (4)	4–1	Bolwarra Lorn (7)
NNSW	STH	14	Garden Suburb (4)	3–4	Kotara South (5)
NNSW	STH	15	Nelson Bay (5)	0–3	Beresfield FC (5)
NNSW	STH	16	Maryland Fletcher (6)	0–6	Wallsend FC (3)
NNSW	STH	17	Lake Macquarie City (3)	8–1	Cardiff City (4)
NNSW	STH	18	South Cardiff (3)	1–1†	Cessnock City (3)
South Cardiff advance 4–2 on penalties.
NNSW	STH	19	Raymond Terrace (5)	4–1	Westlakes Wildcats (6)
NNSW	STH	20	Stockton Sharks (5)	6–6†	West Wallsend (3)
West Wallsend advance 8–7 on penalties.
NNSW	STH	21	Thornton Redbacks (3)	5–0	Edgeworth Junior (7)
NNSW	STH	22	Newcastle University (4)	0–2	New Lambton Eagles (4)
NNSW	STH	23	Medowie FC (6)	5–5†	Mayfield United Junior (7)
Medowie FC advance 5–4 on penalties.
NNSW	STH	24	Cooks Hill United (3)	3–3†	Dudley Redhead Senior (4)
Dudley Redhead Senior advance 3–1 on penalties.
NNSW	STH	25	Warners Bay (5)	2–4	Morisset United (4)
NNSW	STH	26	Jesmond FC (5)	w/o	Tenambit Sharks (7)
NNSW	STH	27	Beresfield United Senior (4)	3–3†	Toronto Awaba (3)
Beresfield United Senior advance 4–3 on penalties.
NNSW	STH	28	Kahibah FC (3)	5–2	Newcastle Suns (4)
NNSW	STH	29	Merewether Advance (6)	w/o	Kurri Kurri (6)
NNSW	STH	30	Charlestown Junior (5)	0–3	Singleton Strikers (3)
NNSW	STH	31	Swansea FC (4)	2–4	Belmont Swansea United (3)
Queensland
QLD	BNE	32	Logan City (7)	1–5	Acacia Ridge (5)
QLD	BNE	33	Ipswich City (5)	0–3	Tarragindi Tigers (6)
QLD	BNE	34	Western Spirit (5)	0–3	Souths United (4)
QLD	BNE	35	Greenbank FC (7)	0–12	The Gap (5)
QLD	BNE	36	Ridge Hills United (6)	0–2	Brisbane Force (5)
QLD	BNE	37	Virginia United (6)	2–2†	St. George Willawong (7)
Virginia United advance 8–7 on penalties.
QLD	BNE	38	Toowong FC (6)	5–1	Newmarket SFC (6)
QLD	BNE	39	Kangaroo Point Rovers (7)	1–3	Narangba United (6)
QLD	BNE	40	Bardon Latrobe (6)	0–5	Jimboomba United (6)
QLD	BNE	41	Grange Thistle (4)	6–0	Caboolture Sports (7)
QLD	BNE	42	Springfield United (7)	0–4	Park Ridge (5)
QLD	BNE	43	Bethania Rams (7)	2–3†	Mooroondu FC (6)
QLD	BNE	44	Deception Bay (7)	4–0	Logan Village (7)
QLD	BNE	45	Westside FC (6)	2–2†	Annerley FC (5)
Annerley FC advance 5–4 on penalties.
QLD	BNE	46	Samford Rangers (7)	2–3	New Farm United (5)
QLD	BNE	47	Brighton Bulldogs (7)	w/o	Redcliffe PCYC (5)
QLD	BNE	48	Pine Hills (5)	2–0	Clairvaux FC (6)
QLD	BNE	49	North Brisbane (7)	0–5	Bayside United (4)
QLD	BNE	50	Oxley United (5)	3–4†	AC Carina (6)
QLD	BNE	51	Logan Metro (7)	2–8	Centenary Stormers (4)
QLD	BNE	52	Southside Eagles (4)	6–0	Slacks Creek (5)
QLD	FNQ	53	Leichhardt Lions (3)	2–0	Mareeba United (3)
QLD	FNQ	54	Innisfail United (3)	11–2	JCU Cairns FC (3)
QLD	FNQ	55	Edge Hill United (3)	5–2	Southside Comets (3)
QLD	NQ	56	MA Olympic (3)	7–0	Ross River (3)
QLD	SC	57	Buderim Wanderers (3)	3–2†	Maroochydore FC (3)
QLD	SC	58	Beerwah Glasshouse United (3)	4–2	Nambour Yandina (3)
QLD	SC	59	Woombye FC (3)	3–0	Coolum FC (3)
QLD	SC	60	Kawana FC (3)	3–1	Caloundra FC (3)

Fed	Zone	Tie no	Home team (Tier)	Score	Away team (Tier)
QLD	GC	61	Mudgeeraba SC (3)	2–2†	Magic United (3)
Magic United advance 6–5 on penalties.
QLD	SWQ	62	St Albans (3)	3–0	University of Southern Queensland (3)
QLD	SWQ	63	Willowburn FC (3)	3–2	West Wanderers United (3)
QLD	SWQ	64	Gatton FC (3)	7–0	Rockville Rovers (3)
South Australia
SA	–	65	International Mount Gambier (5)	1–10	Adelaide University (5)
SA	–	66	Gambier Centrals (5)	3–2	Renmark Olympic (5)
SA	–	67	Rostrevor Old Collegians (5)	2–0	Apollo Mount Gambier (5)
SA	–	68	Barmera United (5)	3–4	Gawler SC (4)
SA	–	69	Adelaide Cobras (4)	3–1	Adelaide Vipers (4)
SA	–	70	Eastern United (4)	4–3	Mount Barker United (4)
SA	–	71	Northern Demons (4)	3–0	Seaford Rangers (4)
Victoria
VIC	–	72	Corio SC (5)	5–1	Seaford United (5)
VIC	–	73	Shepparton South (9)	4–1	Dandenong Warriors (8)
VIC	–	74	Twin City Wanderers (9)	w/o	South Yarra (6)
VIC	–	75	Knox City (6)	5–0	La Trobe University (6)
VIC	–	76	Northern Falcons (7)	4–1	Whitehorse United (7)
VIC	–	77	Truganina Hornets (7)	2–1	Heatherton United (5)
VIC	–	78	Cleeland United (9)	0–4	FC Williamstown (6)
VIC	–	79	Fitzroy City (5)	3–0	Brimbank Stallions (7)
VIC	–	80	Upfield SC (6)	1–0	Hampton Park United Sparrows (7)
VIC	–	81	Sunbury United (5)	w/o	Noble Park United (5)
VIC	–	82	Carey EFC (7)	3–1	Maribyrnong Greens (7)
VIC	–	83	Keysborough SC (7)	2–1	Old Melburnians (6)
VIC	–	84	Fawkner SC (6)	1–4	Caulfield United Cobras (5)
VIC	–	85	Marcellin Old Collegians (7)	1–5	Moreland United (5)
VIC	–	86	Melton Phoenix (7)	3–3†	Sporting Whittlesea (5)
Melton Phoenix advance 4–3 on penalties.
VIC	–	87	Eltham Redbacks (6)	3–1	Doncaster Rovers (5)
VIC	–	88	Peninsula Strikers (5)	3–0	Skye United (7)
VIC	–	89	Elwood City (7)	3–1	Moreland Eagles (8)
VIC	–	90	RMIT FC (8)	1–2	Doveton SC (5)
VIC	–	91	Dingley Stars (6)	1–0	University of Melbourne (6)
VIC	–	92	Geelong Rangers (6)	7–0	Croydon City Arrows (6)
VIC	–	93	Lyndale United (7)	0–2	Endeavour Hills Fire (7)
VIC	–	94	Whittlesea United (6)	3–1	North Caulfield (5)
VIC	–	95	Wangaratta City (9)	2–1	Hume United (5)
VIC	–	96	Altona City (5)	1–0	Lalor United (6)
VIC	–	97	St Kilda SC (5)	2–1†	North Melbourne Athletic (8)
VIC	–	98	St Kevins Old Boys (7)	2–0	Western Eagles (6)
VIC	–	99	Melbourne City (6)	3–2†	Epping City (7)
VIC	–	100	Beaumaris SC (5)	3–1	Spring Hills (7)
VIC	–	101	Rowville Eagles (7)	1–3	Mazenod United (6)
VIC	–	102	Bell Park (7)	0–1†	Geelong SC (5)
VIC	–	103	Sandringham SC (5)	3–2	Heidelberg Stars (5)
VIC	–	104	Old Scotch (5)	4–2†	West Preston (7)
VIC	–	105	Point Cook (7)	4–1	Collingwood City (7)
VIC	–	106	Monbulk Rangers (6)	3–2†	Westvale FC (6)
VIC	–	107	Riversdale SC (6)	0–1	Hoppers Crossing (5)
VIC	–	108	Essendon Royals (5)	7–0	Old Ivanhoe Grammarians (8)
VIC	–	109	FC Strathmore (7)	1–2	Middle Park (6)
VIC	–	110	Myrtleford Savoy (9)	4–1	North City Wolves (7)
VIC	–	111	Brighton SC (6)	1–0†	Essendon United (5)
Western Australia
WA	–	112	Margaret River (5)	w/o	Perth Royals (5)
WA	–	113	Bunbury United (5)	3–1	Southern Spirit (5)
WA	–	114	Kwinana United (6)	9–1	Geraldton Rovers (5)
WA	–	115	Ballajura AFC (7)	1–9	Bunbury Dynamos (5)
WA	–	116	North Perth United (5)	w/o	Belmont Villa (5)
WA	–	117	Gwelup Croatia (5)	2–1	Wembley Downs (5)
WA	–	118	Kingsley (5)	3–2	East Fremantle Tricolore (11)
WA	–	119	Boulder City (5)	w/o	Albany Bayswater (5)
WA	–	120	Jaguar FC (6)	2–2†	Hamersley Rovers (5)
Hamersley Rovers advance 4–3 on penalties.
WA	–	121	Fremantle Croatia (5)	4–4†	Backpackers FC (7)
Backpackers FC advance 4–2 on penalties.
WA	–	122	North Lake (5)	3–1	Port Kennedy (5)

Notes:

- w/o = Walkover
- † = After Extra Time
- NNSW Byes – Tamworth FC (4).
- QLD Byes – Brothers Townsville (3), Gold Coast Knights (3), Rebels Gunners (3), Palm Beach Sharks (3), Saints Eagles South (3), Stratford Dolphins (3), Surfers Paradise Apollo (3) and Warwick Wolves (3).
- SA Byes – Fulham United (4) and Noarlunga United (4).

== Third round ==
Fed	Zone	Tie no	Home team (Tier)	Score	Away team (Tier)
Australian Capital Territory
ACT	–	1	Lanyon United (4)	1–2	O'Connor Knights (3)
ACT	–	2	Goulburn Stags (4)	2–1	Canberra City (4)
ACT	–	3	Brindabella Blues (4)	6–0	Goulburn Strikers (4)
New South Wales
NSW	–	4	Camden Tigers (5)	6–4†	Central Sydney Wolves (6)
NSW	–	5	Mosman FC (6)	7–1	Leichhardt Saints Canterbury (7)
NSW	–	6	Pagewood Botany (6)	3–0	Woonona FC (6)
NSW	–	7	Dee Why FC (6)	5–0	Banksia Tigers (6)
NSW	–	8	Southern and Ettalong United (6)	5–2	FC Gazy Auburn (5)
NSW	–	9	Carss Park FC (7)	2–1	Woy Woy FC (7)
NSW	–	10	Glenhaven FC (6)	0–3	Coogee United (6)
NSW	–	11	Yagoona Lions (6)	0–3	Glebe Gorillas (6)
NSW	–	12	Killarney District (6)	4–2	Stanmore Hawks (4)
NSW	–	13	Melrose FC (8)	0–8	Umina United (6)
NSW	–	14	Hurstville City Minotaurs (5)	5–0	Doyalson Wyee SC (7)
NSW	–	15	St Marys Convent (6)	1–3	Kissing Point FC (6)
NSW	–	16	Leichhardt Saints Senior (6)	5–1	Arncliffe Scots (6)
NSW	–	17	Greenacre Eagles (7)	0–7	Berkeley Vale (6)
NSW	–	18	Albion Park White Eagles (6)	7–0	West Ryde Rovers (6)
NSW	–	19	Gladesville Ryde Magic (4)	3–3†	Pittwater RSL (7)
Gladesville Ryde Magic advance 3–2 on penalties.
NSW	–	20	Glebe Wanderers (6)	10–0	Amity FC (7)
NSW	–	21	North Epping Rangers (7)	2–9	Hills Brumbies (4)
NSW	–	22	Lane Cove FC (6)	1–2	Gladesville Ravens (6)
NSW	–	23	Glenmore Park (8)	5–1	Kellyville Kolts (6)
NSW	–	24	Rydalmere Lions (4)	2–1	Nepean FC (5)
NSW	–	25	Pennant Hills FC (6)	0–1	Prospect United (5)
NSW	–	26	Kemblawarra Fury (6)	10–0	Western Lions (6)
NSW	–	27	Lilli Pilli FC (6)	2–1†	Dunbar Rovers Eastern Suburbs (6)
NSW	–	28	Chatswood Rangers (6)	0–5	Dunbar Rovers (4)
NSW	–	29	Lindfield FC (6)	11–0	Balmain and Districts (6)
NSW	–	30	Southern Raiders (5)	12–0	Macquarie Dragons (7)
NSW	–	31	Western Condors (5)	3–2	Kanwal Warnervale Rovers (7)
NSW	–	32	Hawkesbury City (4)	3–0	Western NSW Mariners (4)
NSW	–	33	Earlwood Wanderers (6)	w/o	Inter Lions (4)
NSW	–	34	Gosford City (6)	10–2	Oatley RSL (6)
NSW	–	35	The Ponds SC (6)	3–2	Ourimbah United (7)
NSW	–	36	Forest Rangers (7)	0–3	Picton Rangers (6)
NSW	–	37	Auburn FC (6)	0–3	Wollongong United (6)
NSW	–	38	Granville Rage (4)	1–0	Winston Hills (6)
NSW	–	39	Sporting Rovers (6)	0–3	Penrith Rovers (7)
NSW	–	40	Dulwich Hill (4)	6–1	Pendle Hill (6)
NSW	–	41	Maroubra United (6)	12–0	Revesby Rovers (6)
NSW	–	42	Balmain Tigers (4)	2–1	Doonside Hawks (7)
NSW	–	43	Bulli FC (6)	4–0	Liverpool SC (6)
NSW	–	44	Manly Vale (6)	5–0	Harrington United (8)
NSW	–	45	Bankstown United (5)	7–0	FC Danphe (6)
NSW	–	46	Ararat FC (7)	3–2	Lokomotiv Cove (6)
NSW	–	47	Putney Rangers (7)	1–11	Wagga City Wanderers (5)
NSW	–	48	Hurstville ZFC (5)	1–2	Waverley Old Boys (6)
NSW	–	49	Abbotsford FC (7)	1–5	St George Warriors (5)
NSW	–	50	University of NSW (5)	5–4	Narrabeen FC (6)
NSW	–	51	Strathfield FC (7)	0–1	Padstow United (6)
NSW	–	52	Kenthurst and District (6)	2–3	Sydney University (4)
NSW	–	53	Quakers Hill JSC (6)	3–3†	Sydney CBD FC (6)
Quakers Hill JSC advance 4–1 on penalties.
Northern New South Wales
NNSW	MNC	54	Tuncurry Forster (4)	4–1	Taree Wildcats (4)
NNSW	MNC	55	Port Macquarie (4)	1–5	Wallis Lake (4)
NNSW	NI	56	Norths United (4)	1–0	Oxley Vale Attunga (4)
NNSW	NI	57	South Armidale United (4)	2–0	Tamworth FC (4)
NNSW	NC	58	Urunga FC (4)	3–0	Coffs Coast Tigers (4)
NNSW	FNC	59	Lismore Thistles (4)	10–1	Suffolk Park (5)
NNSW	STH	60	Hunter Simba (6)	1–8	Maitland FC (2)
NNSW	STH	61	Hamilton Azzurri (6)	0–17	Broadmeadow Magic (2)
NNSW	STH	62	Muswellbrook FC (6)	0–20	Edgeworth FC (2)
NNSW	STH	63	Mayfield United Senior (4)	0–5	Hamilton Olympic (2)
NNSW	STH	64	Kotara South (5)	0–10	Lambton Jaffas (2)
NNSW	STH	65	Beresfield FC (5)	1–6	Weston Workers (2)
NNSW	STH	66	Wallsend FC (3)	2–3	Charlestown City Blues (2)
NNSW	STH	67	Lake Macquarie City (3)	1–2	Valentine FC (2)
NNSW	STH	68	South Cardiff (3)	1–3	Adamstown Rosebud (2)
NNSW	STH	69	Raymond Terrace (5)	1–5	West Wallsend (3)
NNSW	STH	70	Thornton Redbacks (3)	6–1	New Lambton Eagles (4)
NNSW	STH	71	Medowie FC (6)	0–7	Dudley Redhead Senior (4)
NNSW	STH	72	Morisset United (4)	2–2†	Jesmond FC (5)
Jesmond FC advance 5–4 on penalties.
NNSW	STH	73	Beresfield United Senior (4)	2–1	Kahibah FC (3)
NNSW	STH	74	Merewether Advance (6)	1–9	Singleton Strikers (3)
Northern Territory
NT	DAR	75	Darwin Olympic (2)	w/o	Palmerston FC (3)
Queensland
QLD	BNE	76	North Star (4)	2–3†	Moggill FC (4)
QLD	BNE	77	Tarragindi Tigers (6)	0–3	Eastern Suburbs (3)
QLD	BNE	78	WYSC Wolves (4)	9–4†	Redcliffe PCYC (5)
QLD	BNE	79	Jimboomba United (6)	0–5	Southside Eagles (4)
QLD	BNE	80	Deception Bay (7)	2–3	Pine Hills (5)
QLD	BNE	81	Ipswich Knights (3)	7–1	Park Ridge (5)
QLD	BNE	82	Centenary Stormers (4)	2–1	University of Queensland (3)
QLD	BNE	83	Toowong FC (6)	0–5	Holland Park Hawks (3)
QLD	BNE	84	Taringa Rovers (4)	1–2	Souths United (4)
QLD	BNE	85	Mitchelton FC (3)	6–1	Brisbane Force (5)
QLD	BNE	86	Grange Thistle (4)	6–1	Annerley FC (5)
QLD	BNE	87	Peninsula Power (3)	3–1	Brisbane Knights (4)
QLD	BNE	88	Mooroondu FC (6)	1–5	Virginia United (6)
QLD	BNE	89	Narangba United (6)	0–9	Queensland Lions (3)
QLD	BNE	90	Acacia Ridge (5)	1–0	AC Carina (6)
QLD	BNE	91	Logan Lightning (3)	4–0	Mount Gravatt Hawks (4)

Fed	Zone	Tie no	Home team (Tier)	Score	Away team (Tier)
QLD	BNE	92	Rochedale Rovers (3)	5–0	Bayside United (4)
QLD	BNE	93	New Farm United (5)	1–3	Pine Rivers United (4)
QLD	BNE	94	Capalaba FC (3)	4–0	The Gap (5)
QLD	BNE	95	North Pine United (3)	1–4	Albany Creek (3)
QLD	FNQ	96	Innisfail United (3)	3–2†	Stratford Dolphins (3)
QLD	FNQ	97	Edge Hill United (3)	2–0	Leichhardt Lions (3)
QLD	NQ	98	MA Olympic (3)	4–0	Brothers Townsville (3)
QLD	NQ	99	Rebels Gunners (3)	3–2†	Saints Eagles South (3)
QLD	CQ	100	Emerald Eagles (3)	2–3	Boyne Tannum (5)
QLD	CQ	101	Southside United (3)	5–0	Bluebirds United (3)
QLD	CQ	102	Capricorn Coast (3)	0–5	Frenchville FC (3)
QLD	CQ	103	Central FC (5)	3–3†	CQU Berserker Bears (3)
CQU Berserker Bears advance 8–7 on penalties.
QLD	MRF	104	Mackay West United (4)	0–26	Mackay Magpies (3)
QLD	MRF	105	Mackay Lions (3)	2–4	Mackay Crusaders (3)
QLD	MRF	106	Whitsunday FC (3)	2–2†	Mackay City Brothers (3)
Whitsunday FC advance 6–5 on penalties.
QLD	SC	107	Kawana FC (3)	4–3	Buderim Wanderers (3)
QLD	SC	108	Beerwah Glasshouse United (3)	0–2	Woombye FC (3)
QLD	GC	109	Gold Coast Knights (3)	0–4	Surfers Paradise Apollo (3)
QLD	GC	110	Palm Beach Sharks (3)	1–4	Magic United (3)
QLD	SWQ	111	Willowburn FC (3)	4–3	St Albans (3)
QLD	SWQ	112	Gatton FC (3)	7–4	Warwick Wolves (3)
South Australia
SA	–	113	Para Hills (3)	1–4	Croydon Kings (2)
SA	–	114	Fulham United (4)	2–1	The Cove (3)
SA	–	115	Adelaide Raiders (2)	0–1	North Eastern MetroStars (2)
SA	–	116	West Torrens Birkalla (2)	2–0	Adelaide Victory (3)
SA	–	117	Port Adelaide Pirates (3)	4–1†	Noarlunga United (4)
SA	–	118	Adelaide Blue Eagles (2)	4–1	Adelaide Cobras (4)
SA	–	119	Western Strikers (3)	7–0	Gambier Centrals (5)
SA	–	120	Adelaide City (2)	2–0	Playford City (3)
SA	–	121	Adelaide Comets (2)	8–2	South Adelaide (2)
SA	–	122	White City (2)	2–1	Modbury Jets (3)
SA	–	123	Campbelltown City (2)	4–0	Sturt Lions (3)
SA	–	124	West Adelaide (2)	4–0	Salisbury United (3)
SA	–	125	Eastern United (4)	0–7	Adelaide University (5)
SA	–	126	Gawler SC (4)	1–0	Rostrevor Old Collegians (5)
SA	–	127	Adelaide Hills Hawks (3)	1–3†	Cumberland United (3)
SA	–	128	Northern Demons (4)	1–3	Adelaide Olympic (2)
Tasmania
TAS	–	129	Riverside Olympic (3)	2–4	New Town Eagles (3)
TAS	–	130	Hobart United (3)	2–2†	Beachside FC (3)
Beachside FC advance 5–3 on penalties.
TAS	–	131	Launceston United (3)	8–2	Metro FC (3)
Victoria
VIC	–	132	Malvern City (4)	3–0	St Kilda SC (5)
VIC	–	133	Langwarrin SC (4)	4–2	Berwick City (4)
VIC	–	134	Melton Phoenix (7)	1–2	Sunbury United (5)
VIC	–	135	Truganina Hornets (7)	2–9	Keilor Park (4)
VIC	–	136	Yarraville Glory (4)	1–0	Altona City (5)
VIC	–	137	Melbourne City (6)	4–3†	Middle Park (6)
VIC	–	138	Keysborough SC (7)	5–0	Northern Falcons (7)
VIC	–	139	Caulfield United Cobras (5)	6–1	Dingley Stars (6)
VIC	–	140	Cairnlea FC (4)	w/o	Twin City Wanderers (9)
VIC	–	141	Brighton SC (6)	1–0	Mazenod United (6)
VIC	–	142	FC Williamstown (6)	0–1†	Clifton Hill (4)
VIC	–	143	Geelong SC (5)	1–1†	Essendon Royals (5)
Geelong SC advance 4–3 on penalties.
VIC	–	144	Elwood City (7)	1–4	Endeavour Hills Fire (7)
VIC	–	145	Sydenham Park (4)	2–3	Manningham United (4)
VIC	–	146	Peninsula Strikers (5)	w/o	Upfield SC (6)
VIC	–	147	North Sunshine Eagles (4)	1–0	Mornington SC (4)
VIC	–	148	Corio SC (5)	1–2†	Diamond Valley United (4)
VIC	–	149	Preston Lions (4)	4–0	St Kevins Old Boys (7)
VIC	–	150	Myrtleford Savoy (9)	0–3	Doveton SC (5)
VIC	–	151	South Springvale (4)	4–2	Moreland United (5)
VIC	–	152	Shepparton South (9)	1–0†	Carey EFC (7)
VIC	–	153	Wangaratta City (9)	w/o	Banyule City (4)
VIC	–	154	Altona Magic (4)	4–0	Hoppers Crossing (5)
VIC	–	155	Whittlesea United (6)	4–0	Fitzroy City (5)
VIC	–	156	Knox City (6)	3–1	Old Scotch (5)
VIC	–	157	Casey Comets (4)	4–2†	Warragul United (4)
VIC	–	158	Sandringham SC (5)	5–0	Geelong Rangers (6)
VIC	–	159	Eltham Redbacks (6)	3–2	Morwell Pegasus (4)
VIC	–	160	Frankston Pines (4)	4–5	Western Suburbs (4)
VIC	–	161	Monbulk Rangers (6)	2–0	Point Cook (7)
VIC	–	162	Altona East Phoenix (4)	2–3	Beaumaris SC (5)
VIC	–	163	Mooroolbark SC (4)	1–0	Westgate FC (4)
Western Australia
WA	–	164	Canning City (3)	2–2†	Kwinana United (6)
Canning City advance 3–2 on penalties.
WA	–	165	Dianella White Eagles (3)	4–2	Bunbury United (5)
WA	–	166	Joondalup United (3)	3–4	Ashfield (3)
WA	–	167	Margaret River (5)	2–1	Balga (4)
WA	–	168	Shamrock Rovers Perth (3)	0–1	Gwelup Croatia (5)
WA	–	169	Mandurah City (3)	5–1	Joondalup City (4)
WA	–	170	Olympic Kingsway (4)	0–4	Forrestfield United (3)
WA	–	171	Rockingham City (3)	1–2	Fremantle City (4)
WA	–	172	Melville City (4)	0–1	North Lake (5)
WA	–	173	Swan United (4)	3–0	Ellenbrook United (4)
WA	–	174	Quinns (4)	1–4	Gosnells City (3)
WA	–	175	Wanneroo City (4)	1–4	South West Phoenix (3)
WA	–	176	Morley-Windmills (4)	4–1	North Perth United (5)
WA	–	177	Western Knights (3)	11–1	Boulder City (5)
WA	–	178	UWA-Nedlands (3)	4–1	Hamersley Rovers (5)
WA	–	179	Kingsley (5)	3–3†	Curtin University (4)
Curtin University advance 5–4 on penalties.
WA	–	180	Backpackers FC (7)	2–0	Bunbury Dynamos (-)

Notes:

- w/o = Walkover
- † = After Extra Time
- ACT Byes – ANU FC (3), Narrabundah FC (3), Queanbeyan City (3), Weston-Molonglo (3) and White Eagles (3).
- NSW Byes – Barden Ridgebacks (6), Cringila Lions (6), Normanhurst Eagles (6), Randwick City (6), Roselands Raptors (8), St Clair United (7), The Entrance Bateau Bay United (6) and West Pennant Hills Cherrybrook (6).
- NNSW Byes – Bangalow SC (4), Belmont Swansea United (3) and Coffs City United (4).
- NT Byes – Casuarina FC (2), Hellenic AC (2), Litchfield FC (3), Mindil Aces (3), Port Darwin (2), Shamrock Rovers Darwin (2) and University Azzurri (2).
- QLD Byes – Mackay Wanderers (3).

== Fourth round ==
Fed	Zone	Tie no	Home team (Tier)	Score	Away team (Tier)
Australian Capital Territory
ACT	–	1	Belconnen United (2)	8–1	ANU FC (3)
ACT	–	2	Tigers FC (2)	6–0	Goulburn Stags (4)
ACT	–	3	White Eagles (3)	5–0	Queanbeyan City (3)
ACT	–	4	Tuggeranong United (2)	1–1†	Monaro Panthers (2)
Tuggeranong United advance 4–1 on penalties.
ACT	–	5	Narrabundah FC (3)	0–6	Canberra FC (2)
ACT	–	6	Woden Weston (2)	2–0	Brindabella Blues (4)
ACT	–	7	Canberra Olympic (2)	2–2†	Gungahlin United (2)
Canberra Olympic advance 4–1 on penalties.
ACT	–	8	Weston-Molonglo (3)	1–0	O'Connor Knights (3)
New South Wales
NSW	–	9	Barden Ridgebacks (6)	4–2	Pagewood Botany (6)
NSW	–	10	Bulli FC (6)	2–1	GHFA Spirit (3)
NSW	–	11	Gladesville Ravens (6)	1–8	Manly United (2)
NSW	–	12	Gosford City (6)	3–4	Killarney District (6)
NSW	–	13	Coogee United (6)	0–1	Western Condors (5)
NSW	–	14	Hawkesbury City (4)	2–1†	Leichhardt Saints Senior (6)
NSW	–	15	Mounties Wanderers (3)	3–1	Bankstown United (5)
NSW	–	16	Berkeley Vale (6)	1–0	Glenmore Park (8)
NSW	–	17	The Entrance Bateau Bay United (6)	6–1	Maroubra United (6)
NSW	–	18	Carss Park FC (7)	1–6	Dee Why FC (6)
NSW	–	19	Rockdale City Suns (2)	2–1	Macarthur Rams (3)
NSW	–	20	Fraser Park (3)	0–1	Bonnyrigg White Eagles (2)
NSW	–	21	Umina United (6)	0–2	Bankstown Berries (3)
NSW	–	22	Balmain Tigers (4)	1–6	Picton Rangers (6)
NSW	–	23	Wollongong United (6)	3–1	Cringila Lions (6)
NSW	–	24	University of NSW (5)	0–5	Southern Raiders (5)
NSW	–	25	Wagga City Wanderers (5)	4–2	Ararat FC (7)
NSW	–	26	Normanhurst Eagles (6)	0–4	North Shore Mariners (3)
NSW	–	27	Dunbar Rovers (4)	4–1	Hills Brumbies (4)
NSW	–	28	Kissing Point FC (6)	1–2†	Kemblawarra Fury (6)
NSW	–	29	Prospect United (5)	1–4	Marconi Stallions (3)
NSW	–	30	Mt Druitt Town Rangers (3)	3–1	Northern Tigers (3)
NSW	–	31	Hakoah Sydney City East (2)	4–3	Granville Rage (4)
NSW	–	32	Randwick City (6)	0–3	Padstow United (6)
NSW	–	33	Sydney University (4)	1–3	St George Warriors (5)
NSW	–	34	Lilli Pilli FC (6)	0–1	Mosman FC (6)
NSW	–	35	Southern and Ettalong United (6)	4–8	Dulwich Hill (4)
NSW	–	36	Parramatta FC (2)	8–0	Glebe Wanderers (6)
NSW	–	37	Hurstville City Minotaurs (5)	5–2	Quakers Hill JSC (6)
NSW	–	38	West Pennant Hills Cherrybrook (6)	0–7	Sydney Olympic (2)
NSW	–	39	Glebe Gorillas (6)	4–0	Penrith Rovers (7)
NSW	–	40	Camden Tigers (5)	2–3†	Gladesville Ryde Magic (4)
NSW	–	41	Sutherland Sharks (2)	0–4	Sydney United 58 (2)
NSW	–	42	St George (3)	7–1	Roselands Raptors (8)
NSW	–	43	APIA Leichhardt Tigers (2)	5–0	Rydalmere Lions (4)
NSW	–	44	Waverley Old Boys (6)	4–2	St Clair United (7)
NSW	–	45	Bankstown City (3)	4–0	Manly Vale (6)
NSW	–	46	Albion Park White Eagles (6)	0–5	Blacktown Spartans (2)
NSW	–	47	Inter Lions (4)	5–1	The Ponds SC (6)
NSW	–	48	Lindfield FC (6)	0–2	Wollongong Wolves (2)
Northern New South Wales
NNSW	MNC	49	Tuncurry Forster (4)	2–1	Wallis Lake (4)
NNSW	NI	50	Norths United (4)	4–1	South Armidale United (4)
NNSW	NC	51	Urunga FC (4)	3–0	Coffs City United (4)
NNSW	FNC	52	Bangalow SC (4)	4–1	Lismore Thistles (4)
NNSW	STH	53	Jesmond FC (5)	3–4	Belmont Swansea United (3)
NNSW	STH	54	Dudley Redhead Senior (4)	1–1†	Singleton Strikers (3)
Singleton Strikers advance 4–3 on penalties.
NNSW	STH	55	Thornton Redbacks (3)	2–0	West Wallsend (3)
NNSW	STH	56	Beresfield United Senior (4)	1–10	Lambton Jaffas (2)
NNSW	STH	57	Valentine FC (2)	1–3	Hamilton Olympic (2)
NNSW	STH	58	Adamstown Rosebud (2)	2–1	Maitland FC (2)
NNSW	STH	59	Weston Workers (2)	1–2	Charlestown City Blues (2)
NNSW	STH	60	Edgeworth FC (2)	1–1†	Broadmeadow Magic (2)
Edgeworth Eagles advance 4–2 on penalties.
Northern Territory
NT	DAR	61	Darwin Olympic (2)	4–1	Casuarina FC (2)
NT	DAR	62	University Azzurri (2)	2–3	Hellenic AC (2)
NT	DAR	63	Port Darwin (2)	3–0	Mindil Aces (3)
NT	DAR	64	Litchfield FC (3)	1–7	Shamrock Rovers Darwin (2)
NT	ASP	65	Alice Springs Stormbirds (3)	w/o	Verdi FC (3)
Queensland
QLD	BNE	66	Mitchelton FC (3)	8–1	WYSC Wolves (4)
QLD	BNE	67	Ipswich Knights (3)	2–0	Logan Lightning (3)
QLD	BNE	68	Souths United (4)	1–1†	Acacia Ridge (5)
Acacia Ridge advance 5–4 on penalties.
QLD	BNE	69	Eastern Suburbs (3)	5–0	Albany Creek (3)
QLD	BNE	70	Queensland Lions (3)	3–1	Holland Park Hawks (3)
QLD	BNE	71	Virginia United (6)	0–2	Pine Rivers United (4)
QLD	BNE	72	Southside Eagles (4)	3–1	Pine Hills (5)

Fed	Zone	Tie no	Home team (Tier)	Score	Away team (Tier)
QLD	BNE	73	Peninsula Power (3)	4–5†	Capalaba FC (3)
QLD	BNE	74	Moggill FC (4)	1–0	Centenary Stormers (4)
QLD	BNE	75	Rochedale Rovers (3)	4–1	Grange Thistle (4)
QLD	FNQ	76	Innisfail United (3)	1–6	Edge Hill United (3)
QLD	NQ	77	MA Olympic (3)	1–3	Rebels Gunners (3)
QLD	CQ	78	Southside United (3)	1–1†	Frenchville FC (3)
Frenchville FC advance 5–4 on penalties.
QLD	CQ	79	Boyle Tannum (5)	4–3	CQU Berserker Bears (3)
QLD	MRF	80	Whitsunday FC (3)	2–7	Mackay Magpies (3)
QLD	MRF	81	Mackay Wanderers (3)	6–0	Mackay Crusaders (3)
QLD	SC	82	Kawana FC (3)	1–2	Woombye FC (3)
QLD	WB	83	United Park Eagles (3)	5–2	United Warriors (3)
QLD	GC	84	Surfers Paradise Apollo (3)	4–2	Magic United (3)
QLD	SWQ	85	Willowburn FC (3)	3–1	Gatton FC (3)
South Australia
SA	–	86	West Adelaide (2)	1–4	Port Adelaide Pirates (3)
SA	–	87	West Torrens Birkalla (2)	1–4	Cumberland United (3)
SA	–	88	Croydon Kings (2)	4–1	Adelaide University (5)
SA	–	89	Western Strikers (3)	3–0	White City (2)
SA	–	90	Adelaide Olympic (2)	1–2	Campbelltown City (2)
SA	–	91	Adelaide City (2)	1–2	Adelaide Blue Eagles (2)
SA	–	92	Gawler SC (4)	0–6	North Eastern MetroStars (2)
SA	–	93	Adelaide Comets (2)	2–0	Fulham United (4)
Tasmania
TAS	–	94	Launceston United (3)	0–3	Kingborough Lions United (2)
TAS	–	95	Clarence United (2)	1–7	Hobart Zebras (2)
TAS	–	96	Somerset FC (3)	3–1	New Town Eagles (3)
TAS	–	97	Ulverstone FC (3)	2–1	Beachside FC (3)
TAS	–	98	Taroona FC (3)	0–5	Olympia Warriors (2)
TAS	–	99	Glenorchy Knights (3)	0–4	Devonport City (2)
TAS	–	100	Northern Rangers (2)	1–3	University of Tasmania (3)
TAS	–	101	South Hobart (2)	3–0	Launceston City (2)
Victoria
VIC	–	102	Bentleigh Greens (2)	6–1	Diamond Valley United (4)
VIC	–	103	Northcote City (2)	0–1	St Albans Saints (3)
VIC	–	104	Melbourne Knights (2)	7–0	Eltham Redbacks (6)
VIC	–	105	Peninsula Strikers (5)	1–3	Richmond SC (2)
VIC	–	106	Dandenong Thunder (3)	3–0	Werribee City (3)
VIC	–	107	Bulleen Lions (2)	3–0	Nunawading City (3)
VIC	–	108	Murray United (3)	2–1	Moreland City (3)
VIC	–	109	Port Melbourne (2)	6–1	Box Hill United (3)
VIC	–	110	Melbourne City (6)	1–4	Dandenong City (3)
VIC	–	111	Endeavour Hills Fire (7)	2–1	Sandringham SC (5)
VIC	–	112	Manningham United (4)	0–5	Oakleigh Cannons (2)
VIC	–	113	Springvale White Eagles (3)	0–1	Malvern City (4)
VIC	–	114	South Melbourne (2)	10–0	Keysborough SC (7)
VIC	–	115	Mooroolbark SC (4)	5–2	Bendigo City (3)
VIC	–	116	Goulburn Valley Suns (3)	3–0	North Sunshine Eagles (4)
VIC	–	117	Sunshine George Cross (3)	1–0†	Keilor Park (4)
VIC	–	118	Whittlesea United (6)	2–4†	Caulfield United Cobras (5)
VIC	–	119	Hume City (2)	1–0	Brunswick City (3)
VIC	–	120	Shepparton South (9)	1–7	North Geelong Warriors (3)
VIC	–	121	Heidelberg United (2)	3–0	Whittlesea Ranges (3)
VIC	–	122	Eastern Lions (3)	0–1	South Springvale (4)
VIC	–	123	Banyule City (4)	1–2	Doveton SC (5)
VIC	–	124	Monbulk Rangers (6)	0–4	Avondale FC (2)
VIC	–	125	Langwarrin SC (4)	0–0†	Preston Lions (4)
Langwarrin SC advance 3–2 on penalties.
VIC	–	126	Sunbury United (5)	2–4†	Clifton Hill (4)
VIC	–	127	Moreland Zebras (3)	0–1	Geelong SC (5)
VIC	–	128	Green Gully (2)	1–0	Cairnlea FC (4)
VIC	–	129	Beaumaris SC (5)	0–2	Knox City (6)
VIC	–	130	Brighton SC (6)	0–1	Yarraville Glory (4)
VIC	–	131	Western Suburbs (4)	0–0†	Kingston City (3)
Kingston City advance 4–3 on penalties.
VIC	–	132	Casey Comets (4)	1–3†	Pascoe Vale (2)
VIC	–	133	Ballarat Red Devils (3)	1–4	Altona Magic (4)
Western Australia
WA	–	134	Armadale (2)	4–2	Fremantle City (4)
WA	–	135	Gwelup Croatia (5)	3–3†	Ashfield (3)
Ashfield advance 3–0 on penalties.
WA	–	136	Cockburn City (2)	3–1	Mandurah City (3)
WA	–	137	ECU Joondalup (2)	0–1	Dianella White Eagles (3)
WA	–	138	Curtin University (4)	4–2†	Backpackers FC (7)
WA	–	139	Margaret River (5)	3–3†	Swan United (4)
Margaret River advance 5–4 on penalties.
WA	–	140	Balcatta (2)	5–4	Forrestfield United (3)
WA	–	141	South West Phoenix (3)	0–3	Inglewood United (2)
WA	–	142	Stirling Lions (2)	5–2	Morley-Windmills (4)
WA	–	143	Western Knights (3)	2–4	Canning City (3)
WA	–	144	North Lake (5)	0–1	UWA-Nedlands (3)
WA	–	145	Gosnells City (3)	3–1	Subiaco AFC (2)

Notes:

- w/o = Walkover
- † = After Extra Time
- NT Byes – Alice Springs Celtic (2), Alice Springs Vikings (2) and Gillen Scorpions (2).
- QLD Byes – Kawungan Sandy Straits (3).

== Fifth round ==
164 teams took part in this stage of the competition, including 153 qualifiers from the previous round and 16 entering at this stage (11 from the NPL QLD (2)). The lowest ranked side that qualified for this round was Endeavour Hills Fire, the only level 7 team left in the competition.

Fed	Zone	Tie no	Home team (Tier)	Score	Away team (Tier)
Australian Capital Territory
ACT	–	1	Belconnen United (2)	1–1†	Canberra FC (2)
Belconnen United advance 4–1 on penalties.
ACT	–	2	White Eagles (3)	0–3	Tuggeranong United (2)
ACT	–	3	Woden Weston (2)	0–3	Canberra Olympic (2)
ACT	–	4	Weston-Molonglo (3)	2–5	Tigers FC (2)
New South Wales
NSW	–	5	Wollongong United (6)	3–1	Blacktown Spartans (2)
NSW	–	6	St George (3)	4–0	Waverley Old Boys (6)
NSW	–	7	APIA Leichhardt Tigers (2)	3–2	Southern Raiders (5)
NSW	–	8	Picton Rangers (6)	0–1	Hakoah Sydney City East (2)
NSW	–	9	The Entrance Bateau Bay United (6)	0–5	Hawkesbury City (4)
NSW	–	10	North Shore Mariners (3)	0–3	Sydney Olympic (2)
NSW	–	11	Barden Ridgebacks (6)	3–6	Bankstown Berries (3)
NSW	–	12	Dunbar Rovers (4)	0–3	Bonnyrigg White Eagles (2)
NSW	–	13	Wollongong Wolves (2)	2–0	Kemblawarra Fury (6)
NSW	–	14	Padstow United (6)	0–6	Gladesville Ryde Magic (4)
NSW	–	15	Mosman FC (6)	2–0	Western Condors (5)
NSW	–	16	Mt Druitt Town Rangers (3)	2–4†	Killarney District (6)
NSW	–	17	Bankstown City (3)	0–6	Sydney United 58 (2)
NSW	–	18	Rockdale City Suns (2)	1–2	Mounties Wanderers (3)
NSW	–	19	St George Warriors (5)	2–1	Berkeley Vale (6)
NSW	–	20	Glebe Gorillas (6)	1–3	Manly United (2)
NSW	–	21	Inter Lions (4)	2–3	Bulli FC (6)
NSW	–	22	Parramatta FC (2)	4–1	Dee Why FC (6)
NSW	–	23	Dulwich Hill (4)	0–5	Marconi Stallions (3)
NSW	–	24	Wagga City Wanderers (5)	2–0†	Hurstville City Minotaurs (5)
Northern New South Wales
NNSW	MNC v NI	25	Tuncurry Forster (4)	0–2	Norths United (4)
NNSW	NC v FNC	26	Urunga FC (4)	2–1†	Bangalow SC (4)
NNSW	STH	27	Adamstown Rosebud (2)	0–5	Lambton Jaffas (2)
NNSW	STH	28	Hamilton Olympic (2)	4–1	Charlestown City Blues (2)
Northern Territory
NT	DAR	29	Darwin Olympic (2)	3–2†	Hellenic AC (2)
NT	DAR	30	Port Darwin (2)	0–1	Shamrock Rovers Darwin (2)
NT	ASP	31	Alice Springs Stormbirds (3)	0–12	Gillen Scorpions (2)
NT	ASP	32	Alice Springs Vikings (2)	1–3	Alice Springs Celtic (2)
Queensland
QLD	BNE	33	Rochedale Rovers (3)	3–0	Ipswich Knights (3)
QLD	BNE	34	Eastern Suburbs (3)	0–2	Brisbane Strikers (2)
QLD	BNE	35	Moreton Bay United (2)	3–1	Capalaba FC (3)
QLD	BNE	36	Southside Eagles (4)	2–1†	Acacia Ridge (5)
QLD	BNE	37	Queensland Lions (3)	4–1	Western Pride (2)
QLD	BNE	38	Olympic FC (2)	1–4	Moggill FC (4)
QLD	BNE	39	Pine Rivers United (4)	1–2	Redlands United (2)
QLD	BNE	40	Brisbane City (2)	2–0	Mitchelton FC (3)

Fed	Zone	Tie no	Home team (Tier)	Score	Away team (Tier)
QLD	FNQ	41	Edge Hill United (3)	0–6	Far North Queensland (2)
QLD	NQ	42	Rebels Gunners (3)	0–2	Northern Fury (2)
QLD	CQ	43	Frenchville FC (3)	4–1	Boyne Tannum (5)
QLD	MRF	44	Mackay Magpies (3)	5–0	Mackay Wanderers (3)
QLD	SC	45	Woombye FC (3)	1–2	Sunshine Coast Fire (2)
QLD	WB	46	Kawungan Sandy Straits (3)	0–4	United Park Eagles (3)
QLD	GC	47	Surfers Paradise Apollo (3)	1–0	Gold Coast City (2)
QLD	SWQ	48	Willowburn FC (3)	2–3	South West Queensland Thunder (2)
South Australia
SA	–	49	Adelaide Comets (2)	1–0	Adelaide Blue Eagles (2)
SA	–	50	Croydon Kings (2)	1–0	Campbelltown City (2)
SA	–	51	Western Strikers (3)	1–2	North Eastern MetroStars (2)
SA	–	52	Cumberland United (3)	2–1	Port Adelaide Pirates (3)
Tasmania
TAS	–	53	Kingborough Lions United (2)	1–7	Devonport City (2)
TAS	–	54	Ulverstone FC (3)	2–3	Somerset FC (3)
TAS	–	55	South Hobart (2)	2–0	Hobart Zebras (2)
TAS	–	56	Olympia Warriors (2)	3–1	University of Tasmania (3)
Victoria
VIC	–	57	Heidelberg United (2)	4–0	Caulfield United Cobras (5)
VIC	–	58	St Albans Saints (3)	3–1	Yarraville Glory (4)
VIC	–	59	Clifton Hill (4)	2–5	North Geelong Warriors (3)
VIC	–	60	Pascoe Vale (2)	2–3	Richmond SC (2)
VIC	–	61	Bulleen Lions (2)	3–0	Doveton SC (5)
VIC	–	62	Endeavour Hills Fire (7)	0–8	Kingston City (3)
VIC	–	63	Goulburn Valley Suns (3)	0–4	Bentleigh Greens (2)
VIC	–	64	Knox City (6)	0–5	Malvern City (4)
VIC	–	65	Green Gully (2)	0–0†	Geelong SC (5)
Green Gully advance 4–3 on penalties.
VIC	–	66	Murray United (3)	4–2	Langwarrin SC (4)
VIC	–	67	Dandenong Thunder (3)	1–3	Hume City (2)
VIC	–	68	Altona Magic (4)	0–3	South Melbourne (2)
VIC	–	69	Mooroolbark SC (4)	0–3	Dandenong City (3)
VIC	–	70	Avondale FC (2)	5–1	South Springvale (4)
VIC	–	71	Port Melbourne (2)	6–1	Sunshine George Cross (3)
VIC	–	72	Oakleigh Cannons (2)	1–2	Melbourne Knights (2)
Western Australia
WA	–	73	Margaret River (5)	0–8	Gosnells City (3)
WA	–	74	Armadale (2)	3–2	Sorrento FC (2)
WA	–	75	Ashfield (3)	1–2	Balcatta (2)
WA	–	76	Cockburn City (2)	2–0	Bayswater City (2)
WA	–	77	Floreat Athena (2)	5–1	UWA-Nedlands (3)
WA	–	78	Curtin University (4)	2–0	Canning City (3)
WA	–	79	Inglewood United (2)	7–1	Dianella White Eagles (3)
WA	–	80	Stirling Lions (2)	2–1	Perth SC (2)

Notes:

- † = After Extra Time
- NNSW Byes – Belmont Swansea United (3), Edgeworth Eagles (2), Singleton Strikers (3) and Thornton Redbacks (3).

== Sixth round ==
A total of 84 teams competed in this round of the competition. The 42 victorious teams in this round qualified for the Seventh Round. The lowest ranked side that qualified for this round was Killarney Districts. They were the only level 6 team left in the competition.

Fed	Zone	Tie no	Home team (Tier)	Score	Away team (Tier)
Australian Capital Territory
ACT	–	1	Belconnen United (2)	1–4	Canberra Olympic (2)
ACT	–	2	Tigers FC (2)	4–1	Tuggeranong United (2)
New South Wales
NSW	–	3	Hawkesbury City (4)	1–6	Sydney United 58 (2)
NSW	–	4	Manly United (2)	4–1	Killarney District (6)
NSW	–	5	Wagga City Wanderers (5)	w/o	Gladesville Ryde Magic (4)
NSW	–	6	Marconi Stallions (3)	3–0	St George (3)
NSW	–	7	APIA Leichhardt Tigers (2)	2–3	Parramatta FC (2)
NSW	–	8	Mosman FC (6)	2–4†	Mounties Wanderers (3)
NSW	–	9	Sydney Olympic (2)	2–0	Wollongong United (6)
NSW	–	10	Wollongong Wolves (2)	2–1	Bulli FC (6)
NSW	–	11	Bonnyrigg White Eagles (2)	3–1	Hakoah Sydney City East (2)
NSW	–	12	St George Warriors (5)	1–2†	Bankstown Berries (3)
Northern New South Wales
NNSW	STH v NTH	13	Hamilton Olympic (2)	4–0	Norths United (4)
NNSW	STH v NTH	14	Edgeworth FC (2)	3–0	Urunga FC (4)
NNSW	STH	15	Lambton Jaffas (2)	4–2	Belmont Swansea United (3)
NNSW	STH	16	Singleton Strikers (3)	2–1	Thornton Redbacks (3)
Northern Territory
NT	DAR	17	Darwin Olympic (2)	4–4†	Shamrock Rovers Darwin (2)
Shamrock Rovers Darwin advance 7–6 on penalties.
NT	ASP	18	Gillen Scorpions (2)	1–0	Alice Springs Celtic (2)
Queensland
QLD	BNE	19	Rochedale Rovers (3)	2–1	Moreton Bay United (2)
QLD	BNE	20	Brisbane City (2)	0–1	Redlands United (2)
QLD	BNE	21	Moggill FC (4)	0–7	Queensland Lions (3)

Fed	Zone	Tie no	Home team (Tier)	Score	Away team (Tier)
QLD	BNE	22	Southside Eagles (4)	0–2	Brisbane Strikers (2)
QLD	FNQ v NQ	23	Far North Queensland (2)	5–1	Northern Fury (2)
QLD	MRF v CQ	24	Mackay Magpies (3)	2–4	Frenchville FC (3)
QLD	SC v WB	25	Sunshine Coast Fire (2)	7–1	United Park Eagles (3)
QLD	GC v SWQ	26	Surfers Paradise Apollo (3)	5–3	South West Queensland Thunder (2)
South Australia
SA	–	27	Adelaide Comets (2)	2–1	Cumberland United (3)
SA	–	28	North Eastern MetroStars (2)	3–1	Croydon Kings (2)
Tasmania
TAS	–	29	Somerset (3)	0–10	Devonport City (2)
TAS	–	30	South Hobart (2)	3–2	Olympia (2)
Victoria
VIC	–	31	Bulleen Lions (2)	1–1†	Avondale FC (2)
Bulleen Lions advance 4–2 on penalties.
VIC	–	32	Melbourne Knights (2)	3–1	Dandenong City (3)
VIC	–	33	Green Gully (2)	2–0	Heidelberg United (2)
VIC	–	34	Malvern City (4)	0–4	Hume City (2)
VIC	–	35	Richmond SC (2)	3–1	Kingston City (3)
VIC	–	36	Murray United (3)	0–3	Bentleigh Greens (2)
VIC	–	37	St Albans Saints (3)	2–3	Port Melbourne (2)
VIC	–	38	North Geelong Warriors (3)	0–2	South Melbourne (2)
Western Australia
WA	–	39	Floreat Athena (2)	6–3	Armadale (2)
WA	–	40	Cockburn City (2)	5–1	Gosnells City (3)
WA	–	41	Balcatta (2)	1–2†	Inglewood United (2)
WA	–	42	Stirling Lions (2)	5–2†	Curtin University (4)

Notes:

- w/o = Walkover
- † = After Extra Time

== Seventh round ==
A total of 42 teams competed in this round of the competition. The 21 victorious teams in this round qualified for the 2016 FFA Cup Round of 32. The lowest ranked side that qualified for this round was Wagga City Wanderers. They were the only level 5 team left in the competition.

Fed	Zone	Tie no	Home team (Tier)	Score	Away team (Tier)
Australian Capital Territory
ACT	–	1	Canberra Olympic (2)	3–1	Tigers FC (2)
New South Wales
NSW	–	2	Wollongong Wolves (2)	1–0	Wagga City Wanderers (5)
NSW	–	3	Parramatta FC (2)	3–5	Bonnyrigg White Eagles (2)
NSW	–	4	Sydney United 58 (2)	2–1	Sydney Olympic (2)
NSW	–	5	Manly United (2)	1–0	Mounties Wanderers (3)
NSW	–	6	Marconi Stallions (3)	2–0	Bankstown Berries (3)
Northern New South Wales
NNSW	–	7	Lambton Jaffas (2)	3–2	Hamilton Olympic (2)
NNSW	–	8	Edgeworth FC (2)	7–0	Singleton Strikers (3)
Northern Territory
NT	DAR v ASP	9	Shamrock Rovers Darwin (2)	5–0	Gillen Scorpions (2)
Queensland
QLD	BNE	10	Queensland Lions (3)	0–1	Brisbane Strikers (2)

Fed	Zone	Tie no	Home team (Tier)	Score	Away team (Tier)
QLD	BNE	11	Redlands United (2)	2–1	Rochedale Rovers (3)
QLD	NQL	12	Far North Queensland (2)	4–2	Frenchville FC (3)
QLD	SQL	13	Surfers Paradise Apollo (3)	2–0	Sunshine Coast Fire (2)
South Australia
SA	–	14	Adelaide Comets (2)	0–1	North Eastern MetroStars (2)
Tasmania
TAS	–	15	South Hobart (2)	0–1	Devonport City (2)
Victoria
VIC	–	16	Green Gully (2)	1–0	Bulleen Lions (2)
VIC	–	17	Melbourne Knights (2)	2–0	Port Melbourne (2)
VIC	–	18	Hume City (2)	4–0	Richmond SC (2)
VIC	–	19	Bentleigh Greens (2)	4–0	South Melbourne (2)
Western Australia
WA	–	20	Inglewood United (2)	2–9	Floreat Athena (2)
WA	–	21	Stirling Lions (2)	1–2	Cockburn City (2)

Notes:

- † = After Extra Time
