= 2023 Football Victoria Women's State Knockout Cup =

11th season of the Football Victoria Women's State Knockout Cup

Tournament details
- Country: Australia
- Dates: 3 March 2023 – 13 August 2023
- Teams: 100

Final positions
- Champions: Calder United (6th title)
- Runners-up: Bulleen Lions

Tournament statistics
- Matches played: 98
- Goals scored: 460 (4.69 per match)
- Top goal scorer(s): Dayna Stevens; Ebru Baykan (9 goals each)

The 2023 Football Victoria Women's State Knockout Cup is the ongoing 11th season of the Football Victoria Women's State Knockout Cup (known as the Nike F.C. Cup for sponsorship reasons). The competition was open to all women's clubs in the state of Victoria.

Calder United are the defending champions, having beaten South Melbourne to secure their 5th title in a row in the previous season's final.

== Format ==
	Clubs entering in this round	Clubs advancing from previous round	Number of games
First round (41 clubs)	20 clubs from Women's State League 3; 11 clubs from Women's State League 4; 10 clubs from regional and metropolitan leagues	N/A	18 (5 byes)
Second round (60 clubs)	20 clubs from Women's State League 1; 17 clubs from Women's State League 2	23 winners from first round	30
Third round (41 clubs)	11 clubs from Victorian Premier League Women's	30 winners from second round	20 (1 bye)
Fourth round (32 clubs)	11 clubs from National Premier Leagues Victoria Women	21 winners from third round	16
Fifth round (16 clubs)	No clubs enter the fifth round	16 winners from fourth round	8
Quarter-finals (8 clubs)	No clubs enter the quarter-finals	8 winners from fourth round	4
Semi-finals (4 clubs)	No clubs enter the semi-finals	4 winners from quarter-finals	2
Final (2 clubs)	No clubs enter the final	2 winners from semi-finals	1

== First round ==
A total of 41 clubs entered in the first round: 10 from regional and metropolitan leagues (tier 7), 11 from Women's State League 4 (tier 6), and 20 from Women's State League 3 (tier 5). The draw for rounds one and two was made on 22 February 2023.

3 March 2023	Monash City Villarreal (5)	6–0	Somerville Eagles (6)	Brighton
19:30 AEST	Arraiz; Brajdic; Kossmann; Li	Report		Stadium: Mitchell Oval

4 March 2023	Barnstoneworth United (6)	w/o	Mentone (5)	Williamstown
11:00 AEST		Report		Stadium: JT Gray Reserve

5 March 2023	Sydenham Park (5)	6-1	Albert Park (6)	Taylors Lakes
11:00 AEST	Psaila 26', 41', 84'; Davidson 33'; Nghath 55'	Report	Mychasiuk 79'	Stadium: Keilor Lodge Reserve

5 March 2023	Fortuna 60 (7)	2-4	Sale United (7)	Morwell
13:00 AEST	Jarvis 38'; Palermo 76'	Report	Askew 10'; Capitanio 40' (o.g.); Wilson 67'; Stobie 90+2'	Stadium: Crinigan Road South Reserve

5 March 2023	Watsonia Heights (5)	5-2	Castlemaine Goldfields (7)	Greensborough
13:00 AEST	Najmeddine; Wang	Report	Thackray	Stadium: Greensborough College

5 March 2023	Shepparton United (7)	1-2	Collingwood City (5)	Shepparton
13:00 AEST	Williams 49'	Report	Crystal 13'; Robinson 41'	Stadium: John McEwen Reserve

5 March 2023	Alphington (5)	1-8	Strathfieldsaye Colts United (7)	Clifton Hill
13:00 AEST	Tucci 80'	Report	Goal	Stadium: Quarries Park

5 March 2023	Darebin Falcons (5)	4-0	Swinburne University (5)	Preston
14:00 AEST	Goal	Report		Stadium: GH Mott Reserve

5 March 2023	Templestowe Wolves (7)	0-10	Greenvale United (4)	Wantirna South
14:00 AEST		Report	Baykan 3', 9', 49', 59', 85'; Mina 26', 78'; Eliades 33'; El-Hallak 65'; Mina 87'	Stadium: Knox Regional Football Centre

5 March 2023	Seaford United (6)	3-0	Border Raiders (7)	Seaford
14:00 AEST	Barraclough 10'; Tzelios 15'; Lancaster 68'	Report		Stadium: North Seaford Reserve

5 March 2023	Westgate (5)	7-1	Gisborne (5)	Ardeer
15:00 AEST	Taylor 4'; Pham 44', 59'; Moran 57', 66', 90+5'; Pham 88'	Report	Vergez 17'	Stadium: Ardeer Reserve

5 March 2023	Mooroolbark (5)	2-1	Malvern City (5)	Mooroolbark
15:00 AEST	Walsh 30', 90+3'	Report	Papadimitriou 16'	Stadium: Esther Park Reserve

5 March 2023	Dandenong City (5)	w/o	Pakenham United (6)	Endeavour Hills
15:00 AEST		Report		Stadium: Frank Holohan Soccer Complex

5 March 2023	Lilydale Montrose United (5)	0-12	Avondale (4)	Lilydale
15:00 AEST		Report	Zuijlen 11', 48'; Sikic 26', 36', 60', 62'; Zorbas 31'; Missailidis 44'; Candia 47', 54', 85', 90'	Stadium: Mt Lilydale Sporting Complex

5 March 2023	Sandringham (6)	2-6	Aspendale (5)	Cheltenham
15:30 AEST	Rogers 6'; Vella 75'	Report	Carmichael 26', 35'; Turner 53'; Smith 32', 38'; Riordan 42'	Stadium: Kingston Heath Soccer Complex

5 March 2023	Melbourne SRBIJA (5)	0-2	Point Cook (5)	Richmond
17:00 AEST		Report	Gregory 9', 22'	Stadium: E J Bastow Oval

5 March 2023	Melbourne Victory AWT (5)	5-0	Hampton East Brighton (6)	Bulleen
18:00 AEST	3', 27', 35', 50', 78'	Report		Stadium: David Barro Stadium

5 March 2023	Manningham United Blues (5)	9-0	Yarraville (7)	Templestowe
18:30 AEST	Sohar 14', 21', 26'; Kapsimallis 18', 39', 43'; Collins 54', 61'; Fenton 89'	Report		Stadium: Pettys Reserve

Notes:

Byes for Bell Park (7), Pascoe Vale (5), Moreland Eagles (5), Melton Phoenix (6), and Upfield (5)

== Second round ==
A total of 60 clubs played in the second round: the 23 winners from the first round, 17 clubs from Women's State League 2 (tier 4), and 20 clubs from Women's State League 1 (tier 3).

7 March 2023	Pascoe Vale (5)	1–1 (a.e.t.) (4–3 p)	Altona City (4)	Coburg North
19:30 AEST	(?)	Report	(?)	Stadium: Hosken Reserve

9 March 2023	Mentone (5)	w/o	Port Melbourne (6)	Keysborough
19:00 AEST		Report		Stadium: Mentone Grammar Playing Fields

9 March 2023	Keilor Park (3)	w/o	Noble Park United (4)	Keilor Park
19:00 AEST		Report		Stadium: Keilor Park Recreation Reserve

9 March 2023	La Trobe University (6)	w/o	Manningham United Blues (5)	Bundoora
19:00 AEST		Report		Stadium: La Trobe University

10 March 2023	Knox City (3)	w/o	Elwood City (4)	Knoxfield
19:30 AEST		Report		Stadium: Egan Lee Reserve

11 March 2023	Greenvale United (4)	7-0	Seaford United (6)	Lalor
11:00 AEST	Baykan (?); Mina (?); El-Hallak (?); Mina (?)	Report		Stadium: Gilwell Park

11 March 2023	North Geelong Warriors (3)	w/o	Doveton (4)	Lara
15:00 AEST		Report		Stadium: Elcho Park

11 March 2023	Melbourne Victory AWT (5)	0-2	Mill Park (3)	Bulleen
19:30 AEST		Report	Coppock 31' (pen.); Tavella 77'	Stadium: David Barro Stadium

12 March 2023	Banyule City (3)	1-5	Avondale (4)	Yallambie
11:00 AEST	(?)	Report	(?)	Stadium: Yallambie Park Reserve

12 March 2023	Moreland Eagles (5)	0-8	Maribyrnong Swifts (4)	Glenroy
11:30 AEST		Report	Kada 4'; Huynh 27', 53', 66'; Allen 35'; Chau 48'; Konomi 67', 73'	Stadium: Wallace Reserve

12 March 2023	Monash City Villarreal (5)	0-1	Lara United (3)	Oakleigh
13:00 AEST		Report	Polglaze 90+1'	Stadium: Argyle Reserve

12 March 2023	Skye United (3)	2-4	Westgate (5)	Carrum Downs
13:00 AEST	Jaber 45'; Crow 77'	Report	Taylor 26'; Moran 32', 58'; Thomson 90' (o.g.)	Stadium: Carrum Downs Recreation Reserve

12 March 2023	Sydenham Park (5)	3-5	Barton United (4)	Taylors Lakes
13:00 AEST	(?)	Report	(?)	Stadium: Keilor Lodge Reserve

12 March 2023	Point Cook (5)	9-0	Watsonia Heights (5)	Point Cook
13:00 AEST	Gregory 5', 44'; Georgopoulos 32'; Van Berkel 37', 65'; Fonua 43', 73', 80'; Seward 66'	Report		Stadium: Saltwater Reserve

12 March 2023	Darebin Falcons (5)	2-0	Upfield (5)	Preston
14:00 AEST	Sahi 1'; Sibillin 65'	Report		Stadium: GH Mott Reserve

12 March 2023	Pakenham United (6)	w/o	Croydon City (3)	Pakenham
15:00 AEST		Report		Stadium: IYU Recreation Reserve

12 March 2023	Strathfieldsaye Colts United (7)	w/o	Yarra Jets (4)	California Gully
15:00 AEST		Report		Stadium: Truscott Reserve

12 March 2023	Noble Hurricanes (3)	w/o	Bundoora United (3)	Springvale South
15:00 AEST		Report		Stadium: Alex Nelson Reserve

12 March 2023	Ashburton United (4)	3-4	Clifton Hill (3)	Clayton
15:00 AEST	Rubens 28'; Duckett 86'; Schaffner 89' (o.g.)	Report	Schaffner 10'; Waller 14'; Marques 19'; Theodorou 46'	Stadium: Monash University

12 March 2023	Aspendale (5)	10-0	Brunswick City (4)	Cheltenham
15:30 AEST	Smith 2', 85', 88'; Riordan 19', 55' (pen.), 63', 84'; Turner 39', 49'; Moloney 81'	Report		Stadium: Kingston Heath Soccer Complex

12 March 2023	Ballarat (5)	1-0	Fawkner (4)	Redan
16:00 AEST	Pym 32'	Report		Stadium: Ballarat Regional Soccer Facility

12 March 2023	Beaumaris (3)	0-4	Craigieburn City (3)	Beaumaris
16:00 AEST		Report	Baschin 17', 26'; Waljairin 76'; Awad 78'	Stadium: Beaumaris Secondary College

12 March 2023	Brunswick Zebras (3)	0-1 (a.e.t.)	Geelong Rangers (3)	Brunswick
16:00 AEST		Report	Van Dalen 101'	Stadium: Clifton Park

12 March 2023	Sale United (7)	3-2	St Albans Saints (4)	Sale
16:00 AEST	Breakspear 9'; Ryan 17'; Anderson 72' (pen.)	Report	Delija 26'; Pavlinusic 53'	Stadium: Godfrey Baldwin Reserve

12 March 2023	Mooroolbark (5)	2-5	Ballarat City (4)	Mooroolbark
19:30 AEST	D'Ortenzio 54'; Walsh 87'	Report	Johnston 2', 17' (pen.), 35', 72'; Stevens 19'	Stadium: Esther Park Reserve

13 March 2023	Monash University (3)	4-0	Bell Park (7)	Clayton
15:00 AEST	Townsend 51', 85'; Mason 55', 86' (pen.)	Report		Stadium: Monash University Playing Fields

13 March 2023	Caroline Springs George Cross (3)	4-0	Kings Domain (3)	Fraser Rise
16:00 AEST	(?)	Report		Stadium: City Vista Pavilion & Sports Field

13 March 2023	Hoppers Crossing (4)	0-3	Collingwood City (5)	Hoppers Crossing
16:00 AEST		Report	Crystal 4'; Robinson 54' (?)	Stadium: Grange Reserve

13 March 2023	Mazenod (3)	9-0	Maccabi FC Caulfield (4)	Burwood
19:00 AEST	Hill 16', 32'; Cruickshank 27', 61', 76'; Loudovaris 31'; Heasly 38', 69'; Karagiannis 87'	Report		Stadium: Gardiners Creek Reserve

13 March 2023	Melton Phoenix (6)	0-6	Bayside Argonauts (3)	Melton
19:30 AEST		Report	Sant 10' (o.g.); Botsioulis 56', 71'; Katelis 58'; Taliadoros 63'; Vickov 86'	Stadium: MacPherson Park

== Third round ==
A total of 41 clubs played in the third round: the 30 winners from the second round, and 11 clubs from Victorian Premier League Women's (tier 2).

17 March 2023	Bayside Argonauts (3)	1–4	Essendon Royals (2)	Clayton
20:00 AEST	Collins-Graham 53'	Report	Trajkovska 50'; Koizumi 75' (pen.); Sawa 79'; Wild 88'	Stadium: Monash University

17 March 2023	Spring Hills (2)	9–1	Mill Park (3)	Caroline Springs
20:00 AEST	Dimoska (?); Stevens (?)	Report	Coppock 16'	Stadium: Springside Recreational Reserve

18 March 2023	North Geelong Warriors (3)	1–0	Keilor Park (3)	Lara
11:30 AEST	Kump 54'	Report		Stadium: Elcho Park

18 March 2023	Brunswick Juventus (2)	9–0	Knox City (3)	Fawkner
12:00 AEST	Zacharias 7'; Spiranovic 27', 43', 50', 75'; Beninca 39'; Deague 55', 69', 86'	Report		Stadium: CB Smith Reserve

18 March 2023	Sale United (7)	3–5 (a.e.t.)	Caroline Springs George Cross (3)	Sale
14:30 AEST	Meereboer (?); Breakspear (?); Harboglou (?)	Report	Azzopardi 49'; Cuic 52', 114' (pen.); Fehmi 115'; Gilchrist 119'	Stadium: Godfrey Baldwin Reserve

18 March 2023	Strathfieldsaye Colts United (7)	1–3	Clifton Hill (3)	California Gully
15:00 AEST	(?)	Report	Marques 15', 24'; Gallina 40' (pen.)	Stadium: Truscott Reserve

18 March 2023	Ballarat (5)	0–5	Melbourne University (2)	Ballarat
17:00 AEST		Report	Westley 40'; Myers 42'; Siryj 43'; Ramirez Martinez 48'; Efe 55'	Stadium: Trekardo Park

18 March 2023	Geelong Rangers (3)	2–2 (a.e.t.) (4–5 p)	Craigieburn City (3)	Bell Post Hill
19:00 AEST	Johansson (?); Emota (?)	Report	Coskun (?); Baschin (?)	Stadium: Myers Reserve

19 March 2023	Monash University (3)	1–5	Glen Waverley (2)	Clayton
12:00 AEST	(?)	Report	Cardaci 17'; Kodilinye 23'; Aarons 77'; Andreopoulos 78', 83'	Stadium: Monash University

19 March 2023	Westgate (5)	4–2	Monbulk Rangers (2)	Ardeer
13:00 AEST	Pham 26'; Moran 70', 72'; Taylor 89'	Report	Simpson 30', 52'	Stadium: Ardeer Reserve

19 March 2023	Barton United (4)	0–9	Avondale (4)	Cranbourne West
13:00 AEST		Report	Houghton 2', 5', 70', 82'; Zuijlen 39'; Sikic 51', 65'; Candia 71'; Iosifidis 72'	Stadium: Barton Recreation Reserve

19 March 2023	Collingwood City (5)	1–4	Lara United (3)	Richmond
14:00 AEST	Moses 60'	Report	Zahra 30', 53'; Dunphy 35' (o.g.); Kenyon 46'	Stadium: E J Bastow Oval

19 March 2023	Aspendale (5)	4–0	Mentone (5)	Aspendale Gardens
15:00 AEST	Smith 5', 51'; Carmichael 12', 29'	Report		Stadium: Aspendale Gardens Sports Ground

19 March 2023	Casey Comets (2)	6–1	Mazenod (3)	Cranbourne
15:00 AEST	Ambo 22', 60', 80'; Ferreyra Bas 25'; Hinds 44'; Jacobs 49'	Report	(?)	Stadium: Comets Stadium

19 March 2023	Geelong Galaxy United (2)	4–0	South Yarra (2)	North Geelong
15:00 AEST	Vivian 17'; Seino 69', 82'; Estrada 75'	Report	(?)	Stadium: Hume Reserve

19 March 2023	Ballarat City (4)	13–0	Darebin Falcons (5)	Redan
17:00 AEST	Rose-Grigg 4', 12', 37', 41'; Fraser 26', 28'; Johnston 44'; Ciantar 47', 69'; Chester 52', 87', 90'; Slater 78'	Report		Stadium: Ballarat Regional Soccer Facility

19 March 2023	Manningham United Blues (5)	5–0	Pascoe Vale (5)	Templestowe
17:00 AEST	Collins 5'; Kapsimallis 10', 42', 44', 74'	Report		Stadium: Pettys Reserve

19 March 2023	Eltham Redbacks (2)	4–1	Point Cook (5)	Eltham North
17:30 AEST	Wyatt 7'; Kenny 10', 65'; Yamashita 72'	Report	Gregory 19'	Stadium: Eltham North Reserve

19 March 2023	Croydon City (3)	1–0	Greenvale United (4)	Croydon
19:00 AEST	Tokell (?)	Report		Stadium: Dorset Recreation Reserve

20 March 2023	Ringwood City (2)	8–0	Maribyrnong Swifts (4)	Ringwood
20:00 AEST	Lusi 10' (pen.), 85'; Papamichael 20', 40'; Ong 58'; Barber 64'; Bell 69'; Osborne 90+1'	Report		Stadium: Jubilee Park

Notes:

Bye for Bundoora United (3)

== Fourth round ==
A total of 32 clubs played in the fourth round: the 21 winners from the third round, and 11 clubs from the National Premier Leagues Victoria Women (tier 1).

11 April 2023	South Melbourne (1)	w/o	Westgate (5)	Albert Park
20:00 AEST		Report		Stadium: Lakeside Stadium

11 April 2023	Lara United (3)	1–7	Boroondara-Carey Eagles (1)	Lara
20:30 AEST	Wilkinson 55'	Report	Paracki 7', 38'; Best 30'; Sumaoro 36', 58', 83'; Merry 66'	Stadium: Lara Recreation Reserve

12 April 2023	Bulleen Lions (1)	2-1	Bundoora United (3)	Bulleen
19:30 AEST	Oastler 44'; Burn 82'	Report	Missailidis 38'	Stadium: David Barro Stadium

12 April 2023	Casey Comets (2)	4-2	Spring Hills (2)	Cranbourne
20:00 AEST	Ambo 5', 58', 77'; Ferreyra Bas 67'	Report	Corso 43'; Stevens 46'	Stadium: Comets Stadium

12 April 2023	Ringwood City (2)	0-4	Heidelberg United (1)	Ringwood
20:00 AEST		Report	Blackett 24', 73'; Parbery 29'; Vlahopoulos 81'	Stadium: Jubilee Park

15 April 2023	North Geelong Warriors (3)	6-2	Aspendale (5)	Lara
10:30 AEST	Heric 29', 78'; Mamootil 56'; Popplewell 59'; Mckenna 79', 86'	Report	Riordan 30', 81'	Stadium: Elcho Park

15 April 2023	Clifton Hill (3)	3-0	Craigieburn City (3)	Thornbury
15:00 AEST	Schaffner 16'; Araiza-Alba 82'; Marques 85'	Report		Stadium: State Football Centre

18 April 2023	Avondale (4)	2-1	Geelong Galaxy United (2)	Fraser Rise
19:30 AEST	Zorbas 61'; McLeod 70'	Report	Rosselli 19'	Stadium: City Vista Pavilion & Sports Field

18 April 2023	Essendon Royals (2)	4-0	Caroline Springs George Cross (3)	Essendon
19:30 AEST	Sawa 29'; Davies 39'; Delic 70', 82'	Report		Stadium: Cross Keys Reserve

18 April 2023	Eltham Redbacks (2)	2-2 (a.e.t.) (3–5 p)	Glen Waverley (2)	Eltham North
19:30 AEST	Maslen (?); Heyer (?)	Report	Andreopoulos (?)	Stadium: Eltham North Reserve

18 April 2023	Southern United (1)	1-2	Calder United (1)	Clyde North
19:30 AEST	Fernandez 22'	Report	Sewards 51'; Walsh 62'	Stadium: Selandra Recreation Reserve

18 April 2023	Box Hill United (1)	6-0	Ballarat City (4)	Box Hill
19:30 AEST	Mazzeo 8'; Josefski 14', 39'; Moriya 17'; Langley 20', 44'	Report		Stadium: Wembley Park

18 April 2023	FV Emerging (1)	2-0	Melbourne University (2)	Wantirna South
20:00 AEST	Geressu 28'; Keppens 66'	Report		Stadium: Knox Regional Football Centre

18 April 2023	Bayside United (1)	8-0	Manningham United Blues (5)	Cheltenham
20:30 AEST	Deaver 10', 22'; Bomford 26'; Storay 44'; Parker 48'; Budiongo 67'; Dimas 74', 82'	Report		Stadium: Kingston Heath Soccer Complex

18 April 2023	Alamein (1)	0-1	Preston Lions (1)	Bulleen
20:30 AEST		Report	Mitchell 23'	Stadium: David Barro Stadium

19 April 2023	Croydon City (3)	0-8	Brunswick Juventus (2)	Croydon
19:30 AEST		Report	Lay 9', 18', 37'; Horikoshi 31'; Okada 50', 53' (pen.), 87'; Zacharias 87'	Stadium: Dorset Recreation Reserve

== Fifth round ==
The draw for the fifth round was made on 26 April 2023, consisting of the 16 winners from the previous round. Women's State League 2 North-West team Avondale was the lowest ranked team in the draw.

9 May 2023	Essendon Royals (2)	2-1	Bayside United (1)	Essendon
19:30 AEST	Delic 26'; Koizumi 57'	Report	Deaver 55'	Stadium: Cross Keys Reserve

11 May 2023	North Geelong Warriors (3)	0-9	Preston Lions (1)	Lara
19:30 AEST		Report	Nishimura 8'; Jones 31', 55'; Mitchell 33', 42', 45+1', 62', 90+2'; Caponecchia 65'	Stadium: Elcho Park

16 May 2023	Glen Waverley (2)	w/o	Heidelberg United (1)	Glen Waverley
19:30 AEST		Report		Stadium: Capital Reserve

17 May 2023	Brunswick Juventus (2)	5-7	Box Hill United (1)	Fawkner
19:30 AEST	Horikoshi 30', 36'; Spiranovic 74'; Lay 81', 84'	Report	Doi 16' (?); Barbieri (?); Langley (?); Moriya (?); Techera (?); Tancin (?)	Stadium: CB Smith Reserve

24 May 2023	Avondale (4)	0-1	Casey Comets (2)	Fraser Rise
19:30 AEST		Report	Ambo 78'	Stadium: City Vista Pavilion & Sports Field

24 May 2023	Calder United (1)	2-0	Clifton Hill (3)	Keilor Park
19:30 AEST	Walsh 12'; Mitchell 61'	Report		Stadium: Keilor Park Recreation Reserve

24 May 2023	South Melbourne (1)	2-0	FV Emerging (1)	Albert Park
20:00 AEST	Reed 69'; Lawson 78'	Report		Stadium: Lakeside Stadium

24 May 2023	Boroondara-Carey Eagles (1)	1-4	Bulleen Lions (1)	Bulleen
20:15 AEST	Eudes 89'	Report	Markovski 18' (pen.), 63'; Jancevski 41', 76'	Stadium: David Barro Stadium

== Quarter-finals ==
The draw for the quarter-finals was made on 29 May 2023. Casey Comets and Essendon Royals were the only non-NPL teams left in the draw.

14 June 2023	South Melbourne (1)	2-1	Preston Lions (1)	Albert Park
20:00 AEST	Checker 56' (o.g.); Mckenna 84'	Report	Torpey 54'	Stadium: Lakeside Stadium

20 June 2023	Calder United (1)	5-2	Heidelberg United (1)	Keilor Park
20:00 AEST	Walsh 22'; Dakic 38'; Mitchell 75'; Sewards 88'; Hieda 90'	Report	Piazza 36'; Lockhart 61'	Stadium: Keilor Park Recreation Reserve

20 June 2023	Bulleen Lions (1)	2-0	Box Hill United (1)	Bulleen
20:30 AEST	Jancevski 29'; Eliadis 49'	Report		Stadium: David Barro Stadium

22 June 2023	Casey Comets (2)	2-1	Essendon Royals (2)	Clyde North
19:30 AEST	Weragoda 31'; Ferreyra Bas 89'		Koizumi 71'	Stadium: Selandra Recreation Reserve

== Semi-finals ==
The draw for the semi-finals was made on 27 June 2023. Casey Comets were the only non-NPL team left in the draw.

12 July 2023	Calder United (1)	2-0	South Melbourne (1)	Keilor Park
20:00 AEST	Hieda 58'; Mitchell 68'	Report		Stadium: Keilor Park Recreation Reserve

13 July 2023	Casey Comets (2)	0-5	Bulleen Lions (1)	Clyde North
19:30 AEST		Report	Jancevski 2', 16'; Bennett 20' (o.g.); Eliadis 22'; Markovski 63'	Stadium: Selandra Recreation Reserve

== Grand Final ==
13 August 2023	Bulleen Lions (1)	0-2	Calder United (1)	Bundoora
17:00 AEST		Report	Deralas; Richards	Stadium: Home of the Matildas
