= Ticci =

Ticci is a surname. Notable people with the surname include:

- Camillo Pabis Ticci (1920–2003), Italian bridge player
- Stefano Ticci (born 1962), Italian bobsledder

== See also ==
- Ricci
- Tucci
