= Kelli McGroarty =

American soccer player (born 2001)

Personal information
- Full name: Kelli Elizabeth McGroarty
- Date of birth: July 12, 2001 (age 25)
- Place of birth: Voorhees Township, New Jersey, U.S.
- Height: 5 ft 6 in (1.68 m)
- Position: Forward

Team information
- Current team: Melbourne City
- Number: 20

Youth career
- 1776 United FC

College career
Years	Team	Apps	(Gls)
2021–2022	La Salle Explorers	42	(14)
2023–2025	Iowa Hawkeyes	45	(7)

Senior career*
Years	Team	Apps	(Gls)
2026	Essendon Royals	25	(33)
2026–	Melbourne City	0	(0)
- * Club domestic league appearances and goals as of September 3, 2026

Kelli Elizabeth McGroarty (born July 12, 2001) is an American professional soccer player who plays as a forward for A-League Women club Melbourne City. She played college soccer and college lacrosse for the La Salle Explorers, and exclusively soccer for the Iowa Hawkeyes. She has previously been a member of Essendon Royals SC, where she won the 2026 National Premier Leagues Women's Golden Boot award.

== Early life ==
McGroarty was born and raised in Voorhees Township, New Jersey. She was a tri-sport athlete at Eastern Regional High School, competing all four years in soccer, basketball, and lacrosse. With the lacrosse team, she contributed to a state championship game appearance in 2019. On the soccer field, she was coached by father Jamie McGroarty after having grown up working as a ball girl for the team in prior years. She set program records in career goals, single-season goals, and hat-tricks. As a junior, she helped the school claim a state title for the first time since 2006.

McGroarty, who played outside of school for local club 1776 United FC, also picked up multiple accolades throughout her youth. She was named the 2018/19 New Jersey Gatorade Player of the Year, the 2018 and 2019 NJ.com Player of the Year, and 2018 Player of the Year for both the Courier-Post and The Philadelphia Inquirer. She was also a two-time All-America, All-east, and All-state honoree.

== College career ==
=== La Salle Explorers ===
==== Soccer ====
Opting to stay close to home, McGroarty accepted a soccer scholarship from La Salle University in Philadelphia. She was initially slated to start her collegiate career in 2020, but the season was pushed back to the spring of 2021 due to the COVID-19 pandemic. In her freshman year, McGroarty played in all 9 of the Explorers' matches and tied for the most goals on the team despite playing primarily as a substitute. Her three game-winning goals led the Atlantic 10 Conference. She earned one Atlantic 10 Rookie of the Week award in February 2021 and was named to the Atlantic 10 all-rookie team.

As a sophomore in the fall of 2021, McGroarty made 10 starts in 16 appearances and led La Salle in goals. Then, after spending the spring of 2022 with the Explorers lacrosse team, she posted a junior year of soccer in which she set new career-highs in appearances, starts, goals, and assists. It would be her final year with the Explorers soccer team, as she entered the NCAA transfer portal ahead of the 2023 season due to feeling exhausted and insufficiently supported by La Salle.

==== Lacrosse ====
McGroarty had initially considered trying out for the La Salle lacrosse team as a freshman, but with the soccer season pushed to the spring of 2021, she was forced to abort the plan. Ahead of the 2022 season, she received a spark of inspiration after watching her old high school lacrosse team and subsequently reached out to the Explorer lacrosse team's head coach. McGroarty was then added to the squad and made her college lacrosse debut on February 19, 2022, making 10 saves against Mount St. Mary's after three years away from the sport. She started 5 of her 15 appearances and recorded over 578 minutes on the year. McGroarty later credited her season with the lacrosse team with giving her a sense of belonging that she had struggled to find previously.

=== Iowa Hawkeyes ===
In search of a change of scenery, McGroarty transferred to the University of Iowa in 2023. She had trouble holding on to a starting spot with the Hawkeyes at the beginning of her senior season, but regained it by the latter portion of the campaign. She ended up leading Iowa to a Big Ten tournament title, earning all-tournament team and Offensive MVP honors in the process. She led the led the Hawkeyes with 7 goals and ranked second with 2 assists.

As a fifth-year player in 2024, McGroarty made only 2 appearances as she struggled with back and ankle injuries. She ended up using a medical redshirt, preserving her NCAA eligibility for the following year. She made a full recovery, aided by generous helpings of acupuncture therapy, and started in all but one of her 21 appearances in 2025. Once again, she led Iowa in goalscoring. On September 9, 2025, she netted 4 goals against Missouri State to set a single-match program record for the Hawkeyes and earn herself recognition as the Big Ten Offensive Player of the Week.

== Club career ==
In January 2026, McGroarty signed a contract with Australian club Essendon Royals SC of the second-division National Premier Leagues Victoria. After scoring twice in her Essendon debut, she went on to find the back of the net 33 times in 25 games to win the National Premier Leagues Golden Boot. 19 of her goals came in her final 14 regular season appearances. McGroarty also helped the Royals win the Football Victoria Women's State Knockout Cup, scoring a header goal in the final to beat Heidelberg United, 4–1.

A-League Women club Melbourne City announced on September 3, 2026, that they had signed McGroarty to her first professional contract on a one-year deal.

== Personal life ==
McGroarty holds a degree in communication studies with a minor in sports and recreation management. She intends to coach after her playing career concludes.

McGroarty has been open about her struggles from an early age with mental health, including experiences with anxiety and depression. At La Salle University, she found difficulty finding effective professional help and communicating about her mental health. After transferring to the University of Iowa, her mental health improved as she received more support. She has since been diagnosed with ADHD.

== Honors and awards ==
Iowa Hawkeyes

- Big Ten women's soccer tournament: 2023

Essendon Royals

- Football Victoria Women's State Knockout Cup: 2026

Individual

- Atlantic 10 all-rookie team: 2020
- Big Ten tournament Offensive MVP: 2023
- Big Ten tournament all-tournament team: 2023
