= 2026 Football Victoria Women's State Knockout Cup =

Australian association football tournament

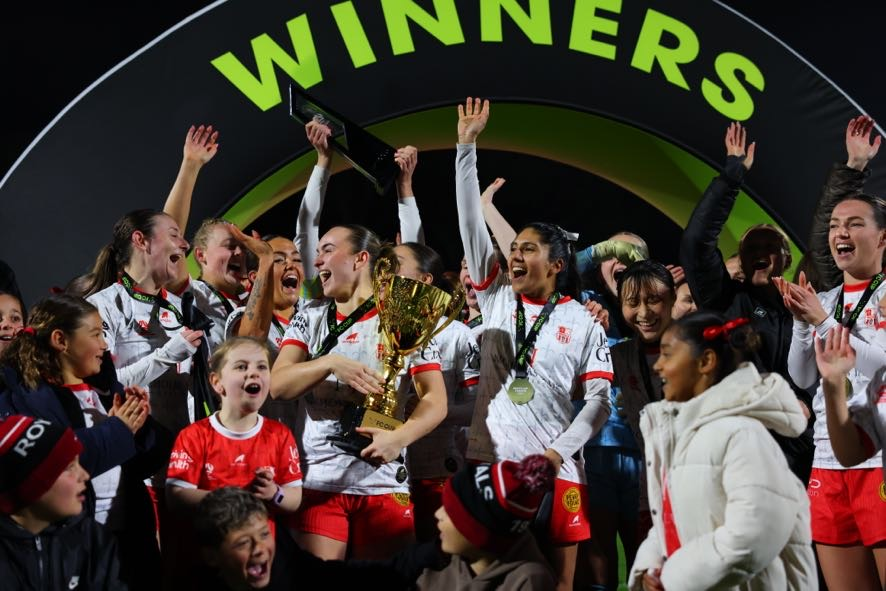
- Essendon Royals players celebrating winning the 2026 Nike FC Cup

Tournament details
- Country: Australia
- Dates: 19 March 2026 – 1 August 2026
- Teams: 99

Final positions
- Champions: Essendon Royals SC (1st title)
- Runners-up: Heidelberg United

Tournament statistics
- Top goal scorer(s): Maximillia Kostur (11 goals)
- All statistics correct as of 3 Augusty 2026.

The 2026 Football Victoria Women's State Knockout Cup was the 14th season of the Football Victoria Women's State Knockout Cup (known as the Nike F.C. Cup for sponsorship reasons), an Australian association football competition. The competition was open to all women's clubs in the state of Victoria.

South Melbourne were the defending champions, having beaten Heidelberg United to secure their 1st title in a row in the previous season's final.

== Format ==
Following South Melbourne's win over Heidelberg United in the 2025 final, 99 clubs from across Victoria competed for glory from March 22 through to when the 2026 Nike FC Cup Final was played and won on the weekend of August 1 at The Home of The Matildas. The 99 Teams would compete in the preliminary rounds to qualify for the quarter finals stage of the Football Victoria Women's State Knockout Cup. Over 5 rounds clubs would compete in knockout matches where teams from different tiers were introduced each round.

=== Round Dates ===
| Round | Dates | TEAMS PARTICIPATING |
|---|---|---|
| Round 1 | Weekend of 22 March 2026 | SLW 2–8, Metropolitan & Regional Affiliate |
| Round 2 | Weekend of 5 & 12 April 2026 | Round 1 Winners & SLW 1 |
| Round 3 | Weekend of 26 April 2026 | Round 2 Winners & VPLW |
| Round 4 | Weekend of 17 May 2026 | Round 3 Winners & NPLW |
| Round 5 | Weekend of 31 May 2026 | Round 4 Winners |
| Quarter Finals | Weekend of 14 June 2026 | Round 5 Winners |
| Semi Finals | Weekend of 5 July 2026 | Quarter Final Winners |
| Cup Final | 1 August 2026 | Semi Final Winners |

== Bracket ==
Quarter-finals
Bentleigh Greens | 2
South Melbourne | 3
Heidelberg United | 4
FC Clifton Hill | 0
Box Hill United | 2 (6)
FC Bulleen Lions (p) | 2 (7)
Alamein FC | 1 (5)
Essendon Royals (p) | 1 (6)

Semi-finals
South Melbourne | 0
Heidelberg United | 1
FC Bulleen Lions | 2
Essendon Royals | 4

Grand Final
Heidelberg United | 1
Essendon Royals | 4

== Quarter-finals ==
The draw for the quarter-finals was made on 15 June 2023. FC Clifton Hill was the only non-NPL teams left in the draw.

| 24 June 2026 | Heidelberg United (1) | 4–0 | FC Clifton Hill (2) | Heidelberg West |
| 19:30 AEST | H. Phillips 20'; O. Wood 25'; I. Razumic 38'; A. Bidwell 42' | Report | | Stadium: Olympic Village |

| 30 June 2026 | Box Hill United (1) | 2–2 (a.e.t.) (6–7 p) | FC Bulleen Lions (1) | Box Hill |
| 19:30 AEST | J. Kawano 16', 68' | | O. Bomford 46'; E. Bunnell 38' | Stadium: Wembley Park |

| 30 June 2026 | Bentleigh Greens (1) | 2–3 | South Melbourne (1) | Cheltenham |
| 20:00 AEST | M. Otero 12'; C. Ferreyra Bas 59' | | M. Westland 10'; A. Pantazopoulos 43'; E. Roach 43' | Stadium: Kingston Heath Soccer Complex |

| 30 June 2026 | Alamein FC (1) | 1–1 (a.e.t.) (5–6 p) | Essendon Royals (1) | Bundoora |
| 20:00 AEST | C. Blissett 112' | Report | O. Bomford 95' | Stadium: Home of the Matildas |
| | Penalties |
| | N.Duston (penalty scored); E.Bougias (penalty missed); S.Laskey (penalty scored); A.Liacopoulos (penalty scored); C.Blissett (penalty scored); M.Templeman (penalty scored); H.Lohrey (penalty missed) | | (penalty scored) G.Maher; (penalty scored) K.McGroarty; (penalty scored) A.Sandhu; (penalty missed) M.Jurcic; (penalty scored) A.Groba; (penalty scored) E.Langley; (penalty scored) I.Sewards |

== Semi-finals ==
The draw for the quarter-finals was made on 1 July 2023.

| 14 July 2026 | South Melbourne (1) | 0–1 | Heidelberg United (1) | Albert Park |
| 19:30 AEST | | Report | H. Phillips 45' | Stadium: Lakeside Stadium |

| 15 July 2026 | FC Bulleen Lions (1) | 2–4 | Essendon Royals (1) | Bulleen |
| 19:45 AEST | C. Mihocic 6'; M. Markovski 11' | Report | T. Eliadis 13' (o.g.); G. Maher 41'; P. Kingston-Hogg 58'; K. McGroarty 66' | Stadium: Veneto Club |

== Final ==
The Nike FC Cup Final was hosted at the Home of the Matildas on 1 August 2026. Essendon Royals defeated Heidelberg United 4–1 to mark their first Cup Final win in the club's history. Maggie Jenkins, who scored two goals in the final, was awarded the Theresa Deas Medal.

| 1 August 2026 2026 Nike FC Cup Final | Heidelberg United (1) | 1–4 | Essendon Royals (1) | Bundoora |
| 18:00 AEST | Anderson 90+3' | Report | Jenkins 19', 79'; McGroarty 49'; Anderson 54' (o.g.) | Stadium: Home of the Matildas; Referee: Angelique Mangion; Man of the Match: Maggie Jenkins |
