= Wagga City Wanderers FC =

Semi-professional association football club

- Full name: Wagga City Wanderers Football Club
- Nickname: Wanderers
- Founded: 2014 (12 years ago)
- Ground: Gissing Oval, Wagga Wagga
- Coordinates: 35°7′50.9″S 147°21′20.1″E
- Head coach: Ross Morgan
- League: Capital Premier League
- 2025: 5th of 8 (withdrew)
- Website: https://waggacitywanderers.com/
Home colours	Away colours	Third colours

Wagga City Wanderers is a semi-professional Australian association football club based in the city of Wagga Wagga, New South Wales. The club was founded in 2014 and as of 2019 the men compete in the ACT based National Premier Leagues Capital Football 2 and its female division compete in the ACT National Premier Leagues Capital Football NPLW.

== History ==
=== Foundation and early years ===
Wagga City Wanderers was established in October 2014 by Football Wagga Wagga Association to grow football in the Wagga Wagga, Riverina and surrounding areas by participating in the State League competition administered by Football NSW

In the first year of competition Wagga City Wanderers was represented by a men's first grade and under 20 team with this expanding to include under 18s over the following seasons.

Wagga City Wanderers also conduct development programs through the Wanderers Academy and competes with SAP 9–12 years boys and girls and under 13-16 junior boys and girls teams. The Academy consists of approximately 220 young players in State competitions & gala days including having the largest representation of any club at the 2017 Kanga Cup.

Relationship with Sydney FC

The Wagga City Wanderers and Football Wagga Wagga are partners with Sydney FC. This includes access to various opportunities associated with Sydney FC.

=== Move to NPL and NPL Women Capital Football ===
Prior to the 2019 Capital Football season, Capital Football announced the inclusion of Wagga City into the newly formed NPL 2 competition to replace the Capital League. The women's division has debuted in 2019 with the NPLW program comprising U13's, U15's, U17's, Reserves and First Grade divisions.

== Players ==
=== Current squad ===
Note: Flags indicate national team as defined under FIFA eligibility rules; some limited exceptions apply. Players may hold more than one non-FIFA nationality.

No.	Pos.	Nation	Player
1	GK	AUS	Samuel McCready
—		AUS	Ahmed Badawy
—		AUS	Caylum Barber
—		AUS	Daniel Okot
—		AUS	Dylan Berkrey
—		AUS	Callum Burns
—		AUS	Jacob Ochieng
—		AUS	Jake Ploenges
—		AUS	Royce Hunter
—		AUS	Kyle Yeates

No.	Pos.	Nation	Player
—		AUS	Lachlan Cook
—		AUS	Abdulius Zoomar
—		AUS	Luke Stevens
—		IRQ	Nashwan Kheder
—		AUS	Prince Thompson
—		AUS	Edmund Wright
—		AUS	Shaun Moffat
—		AUS	Stuart Smeeth
—		AUS	Isaac Kingham
—		USA	Paul Milner
—		USA	Frank Macias
—		IRQ	Bahjat Smoqy
—		IRQ	Naser Smoqy
—		IRQ	Natheer Al Hasan

== Season-by-season results ==
The below table is updated with the statistics and final results for Wagga City Wanderers following the conclusion of each season.

Champions	Runners-up	Third Place	Promoted	Relegated

Wagga City Wanderers Season-by-Season Results
Football NSW
Ref	Season	NSW State League										NPL Finals	Waratah Cup	FFA Cup	Top scorer	
Ref	Season	GP	W	D	L	GF	GA	GD	PTS	League	Finals	NPL Finals	Waratah Cup	FFA Cup	Name	Goals
	2015	18	1	2	15	28	64	-36	5	10th	-	-	3R	-	Scott Dunn	9
	2016	22	7	0	15	44	78	-34	21	10th	-	-	5R	-	Scott Dunn	17
	2017	18	2	1	15	17	60	-43	7	10th	-	-	4R	-	Lachlan Davis	6
	2018	22	2	2	18	15	77	-62	8	12th	-	-	2R	-	Caylum Barber	3
Capital Football
Ref	Season	NPL ACT 2										NPL Finals	Fed Cup	FFA Cup	Top scorer	
Ref	Season	GP	W	D	L	GF	GA	GD	PTS	League	Finals	NPL Finals	Fed Cup	FFA Cup	Name	Goals
	2019	16	7	1	8	29	27	+2	22	6th	-	-	1R	-	Jake Ploenges	5
