= Football Victoria Women's State Knockout Cup =

Victoria, Australia Women's State Knockout Cupfootball competition

- Organiser(s): Football Victoria
- Founded: 2012; 14 years ago
- Region: Victoria
- Teams: 103 (2023)
- Current champions: Essendon Royals SC (1st title)
- Most championships: Calder United (6 titles)
- Website: footballvictoria.com.au
- 2026 State Cup

The Football Victoria Women's State Knockout Cup (colloquially referred to as the State Cup), currently known as the Nike F.C. Cup for sponsorship reasons, is an annual knockout competition and major trophy in women's state football in Victoria. Organised by Football Victoria (FV), it is open to any women's club in the state of Victoria.

First held in 2012 as the Pelada Cup, the women's edition of the state cup was started to give female teams from all across the state the opportunity to compete against each other in a knockout format.

== Records and honours ==
What is currently known as the Nike FC Cup began life as the Victorian Women's Soccer Association Cup - or the VWSA Cup - which was administered alongside the league when organised Women's football commenced in 1974. Football publications and local newspapers often covered the finals, but records for the period between 1985 and 2004 make it difficult to ascertain the composition and result of some finals, let alone whether they were even contested.

=== Nike F.C. Cup Winners (2012–present) ===
Year	Winner (Titles)	Score	Runner-up
2012	Box Hill United (1)	2–0	Bundoora United
2013	Sandringham (1)	1–0	South Melbourne
2014	Bulleen Lions (1)	2–0	South Melbourne
2015	Boroondara Eagles (1)	5–3	Bulleen Lions
2016	Heidelberg United (1)	4–0	Bulleen Lions
2017	Calder United (1)	3–1	Bulleen Lions
2018	Calder United (2)	3–1	Box Hill United
2019	Calder United (3)	2–0	Box Hill United
2020	Nike FC Cup cancelled due to the COVID-19		
2021	Calder United (4)	3–0	South Melbourne
2022	Calder United (5)	3–0	South Melbourne
2023	Calder United (6)	2–0	Bulleen Lions
2024	Bulleen Lions (2)	3–2	Preston Lions
2025	South Melbourne (1)	1–1 (a.e.t.) 3–0 (p)	Heidelberg United
2026	Essendon Royals (1)	4–0	Heidelberg United

=== VWSA Cup Winners (1974–2004) ===
Year	Winner	Runner-up
1974	Green Gully	Melton
1975	Greensborough	Melton
1976	Greensborough	Green Gully
1977	Dandenong	Green Gully
1978	Greensborough	Green Gully
1979	Greensborough	Dandenong
1980	Greensborough	South Melbourne
1981	Greensborough	South Melbourne
1982	Greensborough	Dandenong
1983	Greensborough	Rowville
1984	North Dandenong	Greensborough
1985	North Dandenong	Nunawading City
1986	Coburg	Unknown
1987	North Dandenong	Coburg
1988	Unknown	Unknown
1989	Coburg	Dandenong

Year	Winner	Runner-up
1990	Box Hill	Dandenong
1991	Dandenong	Nunawading City
1992	Berwick City	Nunawading City
1993	Unknown	Unknown
1994	Unknown	Unknown
1995	Berwick City	Doncaster Rovers
1996	Cranbourne Comets	South Melbourne
1997	Unknown	Unknown
1998	Cranbourne Comets	Westvale
1999	Keilor Park	Westvale
2000	No competition	
2001	Unknown	Unknown
2002	Unknown	Unknown
2003	South Melbourne	Unknown
2004	Keilor Park	Ashburton

=== Results by club (2012–present) ===
Nike F.C. Cup finalists by club
Team	Winners	Runners-up	Years won	Years runners-up
Calder United	6	0	2017, 2018, 2019, 2021, 2022, 2023	
Bulleen Lions	2	4	2014, 2024	2015, 2016, 2017, 2023
South Melbourne	1	4	2025	2013, 2014, 2021, 2022
Box Hill United	1	2	2012	2018, 2019
Heidelberg United	1	2	2016	2025, 2026
Sandringham	1	0	2013	
Boroondara-Carey Eagles	1	0	2015	
Essendon Royals	1	0	2026	
Preston Lions	0	1		2024
Bundoora United	0	1		2012
