= Tucci =

Tucci is a surname of Italian origin. Notable people with the surname include:

- Biagio d'Antonio (1446–1516), Italian Renaissance painter, also known as Biagio d'Antonio Tucci
- Carmine Tucci (1933–1990), Italian ice hockey player
- Christine Tucci, American actress
- Davide Tucci (born 1987), Italian-Maltese actor and model
- Debara L. Tucci, American otolaryngologist
- Dudu Tucci (born 1955), Brazilian musician
- Gabriella Tucci (1929–2020), Italian soprano
- Giovanni Maria Tucci (16th century), Italian painter
- Giuseppe Tucci (1894–1984), Italian scholar, explorer, expert on Tibetan culture
- Joseph M. Tucci, known as Joe Tucci (born 1947), former chairman of the board of directors of EMC Corporation
- Lin Tucci (born 1960), American actress
- Maria Tucci (born 1941), Italian-American actress
- Michael Tucci (born 1946), American actor
- Niccolò Tucci (1908–1999), Swiss-Italian writer
- Nicholas Tucci (1981–2020), American actor
- Roberto Tucci (1921–2015), Italian Roman Catholic Cardinal and theologian
- Stanley Tucci (born 1960), American actor, writer, producer and director
- Terig Tucci (1897–1973), Argentine composer, violinist, pianist, and mandolinist
- William Tucci, American comicbook creator

Furthermore, Tucci is the name of a former Catholic bishopric and present Latin Catholic titular see in Andalusia (southern Spain).
