= Point Cook SC =

- Full name: Point Cook Soccer Club
- Nickname: Point Cook Jets
- Founded: 2008
- Ground: Saltwater Reserve, Point Cook; Victoria, Australia
- Capacity: 1000
- President: Belinda Hall
- Head Coach: Tome Petreski
- League: Victorian State League Division 4
- 2025: 5th (promoted to State League 4 North West)
- Website: https://pointcooksc.com.au/
Home colours

Point Cook Soccer Club are an Australian association football club from Point Cook, Victoria, a suburb of Melbourne, Victoria. The club currently plays in the Victorian State League Division 4 West.

== History ==
The Point Cook Soccer Club was established in 2008 in Point Cook, in the western suburbs of Melbourne. The club plays its home games at Saltwater Reserve, which boasts some of the best sporting facilities in Victoria with 1 synthetic oval, 2 x football/cricket ovals and three turf soccer pitches. As of 2014 it had more than 500 members, ranging from junior to senior levels, and including both male and female teams. By 2014 the club had three girls' teams and a women's team.

The under-14 boys' team were runners-up at the Kanga Cup in Canberra in 2013. This is the Southern Hemisphere's largest International Youth Soccer Tournament. The under-15 girls' team competed in the Kanga Cup for the first time in 2014. The under-12 boys won the 2014 Kanga Cup male plate in the first competition in which they played against teams from other states.

In April 2015 the club appointed Craig Filer, from Wales (UK), as the club's Head Coach . The club was aiming to climb to Victorian State League Division 2 within five years, and to eventually compete in the Australian National Premier Leagues.

In 2017, Point Cook SC were promoted from State League Division 4 to State League 3 and despite a tough 1st season finished a respectable 7th just 6 points of a top 3 finish.

== Notable players ==
- Joe Spiteri (2013–2016) – Australia U23 squad at the 1996 Summer Olympics and represented Australia national football team from 1995–1997. Austrian Football Bundesliga club SK Sturm Graz from 1996–1998, Belgian Pro League club Lierse S.K. from 1998–2001 and Allsvenskan club IFK Norrköping in 2001.

== Notable coaches ==
- (Wales) Craig Filer (2015–2019) – Holds a UEFA B coaching license, former scout for Bristol Rovers and former academy co-ordinator at Newport County.
