= Giovanni Maria Tucci =

Italian painter

Giovanni Maria Tucci was an Italian painter. He was a pupil in Siena under il Sodoma. He accompanied his master to Pisa in 1542. He painted chiefly in Siena.
