= Malvern City FC =

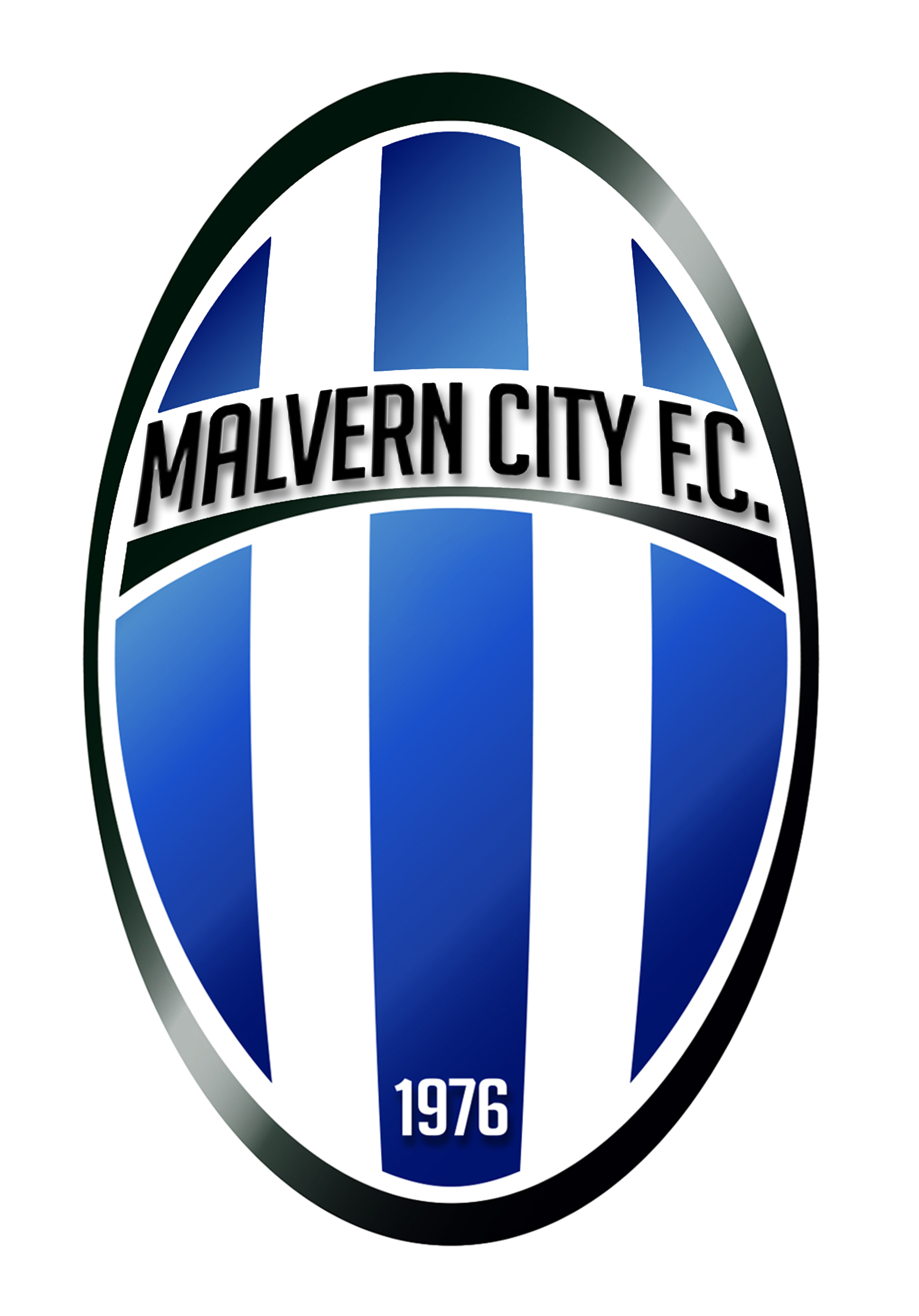
- Full name: Malvern City Football Club
- Nickname: City
- Founded: 1976
- Ground: Sir Zelman Cowen Reserve, Kooyong, Victoria
- Capacity: 500
- Chairman: John Hatzis
- Manager: Savvas Pattikis
- League: Victoria Premier League 2
- 2026: 2nd of 14 (promoted) VPL 1
- Website: http://www.malverncityfc.com
Home colours	Away colours

Malvern City FC is a football (soccer) club in Kooyong, Victoria. The club was established in 1976. The club currently competes in the Victoria Premier League 1. They play their home games at Sir Zelman Cowen Park opposite Kooyong Tennis Club.

== Notable players ==
- Connor Pain (2010-2011) Over 100 appearances in the A-League. Connor previously played for Melbourne Victory, the Central Coast Mariners, Western United FC, Al-Orobah FC , Al-Bukiryah FC and is currently playing for Macarthur FC. Connor is also a full international, having capped for Australia.
- (Australia) Ange Postecoglou (1995)
