= Kanga Cup =

- Founded: 1991
- Region: Australia (AFC); International (FIFA)
- Teams: 322 (2019)
- Broadcaster: Self-broadcast on YouTube
- Website: kangacup.com

The Kanga Cup is a week-long international youth association football tournament held annually in Canberra, Australia during July. The tournament is run as an open cup consisting of both male and female competitors with teams from diverse backgrounds including clubs, schools, associations and community groups coming together to compete in age groups ranging from U9s to U18s. The Cup is hosted by Capital Football and is sanctioned by Football Federation Australia (FFA) and the Asian Football Confederation (AFC). Since 2018 the tournament has been known as the McDonald's Kanga Cup for sponsorship reasons. The Kanga Cup is regarded as the largest of its kind in the Southern Hemisphere and is the most coveted prize in youth football in Australia.

== History ==
The Kanga Cup was founded in 1991 and held in Sydney, Australia with 35 participants. The cup moved to Canberra in 1993 and has been played in the Australian capital ever since.

In 2012, the Kanga Cup welcomed the first representative team from South America in the tournament's 22-year history as 16 players of Estrella Solitaria club from the small working-class town of Batuco, Chile made the long trip over to Canberra. Chilean Ambassador to Australia, Pedro Pablo Diaz, described the opportunity for these teenagers as an unbelievable trip of a lifetime and a chance for these kids to experience a different culture for the first time. He went on to say most of these kids were very poor and this was probably the first and last time they will get to travel internationally.

2013 saw funding cuts for the tournament from the ACT Tourism budget, with only $30,000 available compared to the previous year's budget of $60,000. However, despite the funding cut backs the Kanga Cup still recorded record numbers of participants and teams with 150 interstate teams and six international teams joining 92 local ACT sides. It was considered a particularly good year for local teams with fourteen making grand finals and six walking away with trophies.

One of the biggest surprises of the 2013 Kanga Cup was the grand final win for the visiting U18 Philippine national team, the Teen Azkals. Team manager, Alvin Carranza, brought the team to the Kanga Cup under the banner of Carranz FC to get the next generation of the Philippine national team international experience. The win gave the U18s their first championship title and was used a preparation for the team's participation in the ASEAN Football Federation championship in Indonesia in 2014.

2014 saw a shift in focus for the tournament with a new marketing strategy adopted to ensure the tournament grew from previous years. The 2014 edition of the Kanga Cup saw it coincide with the middle of the FIFA World Cup being held in Brazil. Previously this might have hurt numbers attending the Kanga Cup but the organizers broadcast the World Cup during the Kanga Cup to give the whole event a festival feel. Capital Football CEO Heather Reid, announced the 2014 edition of the cup as "the best ever", with a total of 274 teams having competed along with 144 referees, with 813 matches being played, and concluding with 29 grand finals played at Lyneham on the final day.

The Kanga Cup celebrated 25 years of existence in 2015 with record entries of teams, officials, volunteers and participants. More than 340 teams turned out between 3 and 8 July from as far away as South Korea, as the event drew 7,000 players and a total of over 10,000 people to the ACT. 2015 Kanga Cup tournament director Michael Kelly declared the tournament a success, with fine weather gracing the week-long tournament until grand final day when rain set in.

The 2017 edition saw a record number of players - almost 8000 - taking part, with 378 teams competing. A strong showing was also noted in 2018 with 360 teams participating, including teams from Ghana and Singapore participating for the first time.

In 2019 more than 4500 players from 322 teams took part in the tournament, along with several thousand more coaches, parents and support staff. While around 25 per cent of teams were from the Canberra area, many had travelled from interstate and as far away as New Zealand, the Philippines and South Korea for the tournament.

Expressions of interest for the 30th edition of the Kanga Cup, which was to be held in July 2020 were being sought from teams based within Australia and Overseas for what was expected to be the largest edition of the Kanga Cup to date. Due to the COVID-19 pandemic this was delayed to July 2021.

== Format ==
The tournament is run as an open cup consisting of both male and female competitors with teams from diverse backgrounds including clubs, schools, associations and community groups coming together to compete in age groups ranging from U9s to U18s. Age groups are broken up into three divisions based on skill level where elite teams can face off against each other and social teams can play each other and enjoy themselves. Three categories are offered in most divisions. Cup Competition: Premier League teams, division one teams or district representative teams. Plate Competition: Newly promoted division one teams and division two teams. Shield Competition: Developing teams from lower placed divisions.

== Participants ==
=== International countries ===
The Kanga Cup provides an opportunity for participants to meet players from all over Australia as well as the world. Past international participants have included: Chile, Taiwan, Denmark, England, East Timor, Fiji, Georgia, Hungary, India, Indonesia, Thailand, Italy, New Zealand, China, Philippines, Russia, South Africa, South Korea, the United States, Ghana, Singapore and others. Social and cultural exchange is encouraged between competitors throughout the tournament, with a wide range of social activities available for participants and officials making the tournament a "cultural festival of football".

=== Local participants ===
Many local clubs in the ACT participate on a regular basis including Belnorth FC, Belwest FC, Belsouth FC, Belconnen United FC, Brindabella Blues FC, Majura FC, Canberra FC, Gungahlin FC, Marist College SC, Monaro Panthers FC, Radford College SC, St Edmund's College SC, Tuggeranong United JSC, Weston Creek FC, Woden Valley JSC and Woden Weston FC.

As of 2018, Belnorth FC are the only club to be represented at every Kanga Cup tournament since its inception.

=== Match officials ===
The Kanga Cup attracts referees from local clubs, interstate associations and internationally. Currently there are connections with interstate bodies such as Football West, Football Brisbane, Football Victoria, Football NSW, Sutherland Shire Football Referee Association, Manly-Warringah Football Referee Association, Football Hervey Bay and Central Coast. In addition the Kanga Cup has connections with international organisations, including Auckland Football Federation (NZ) and Mainland Football (NZ). In past editions the Kanga Cup has attracted referees from as far abroad as England, Italy, South Korea, Hong Kong and America. To assist visiting and local referees for the tournament, Capital Football set up the Kanga Cup Referee Youth Academy (KCRYA). The KCRYA is a formalised camp endorsed by the FFA for Kanga Cup referees to participate in technical training during the week long tournament set-out by the FFA level three and four curriculum.

Notable referees to have officiated at the Kanga Cup include former FA and English Premier League referee Peter Walton in 2010 and current A-League and FIFA World Cup referee Ben Williams.

== Venues ==
The Kanga Cup is played across the city of Canberra at a number of different playing-fields from Gungahlin to Calwell. Recent Kanga Cup host venues include:

- Southwell Park, Lyneham (Kanga Cup HQ)
- Calwell Playing Fields
- Dickson District Playing Fields
- Harrison District Playing Fields
- Hawker Football Centre
- Hawker Grass Fields
- Mawson District Playing Fields
- Latham Playing Fields
- Downer Playing Fields (AWD competition)
- Wright Park, Queanbeyan

== Partners and sponsorship ==
=== Sanctioned by ===
FFA | AFC | FIFA

=== Partners ===
Current as of 5 July 2017

Destination Partner: Visit Canberra
Merchandise Partner: Project Clothing
Travel Partner: JT Sports Tours
Photography Partner: Sports in Focus
Official Match Ball Supplier: Mitre

=== Major sponsor ===
Current as of 16 July 2018

McDonald's ACT & Queanbeyan
Former sponsors include: Canberra Milk, 104.7 Canberra, Mix 106.3, and Murrays.

== Broadcasting ==
Capital Football self-broadcast the 2015 edition of the Kanga Cup on YouTube with a live feed of the opening ceremony, day by day action and finals.
