= Sandringham SC =

Australian soccer club

Sandringham Soccer Club is an Australian soccer club based in Sandringham, Victoria. The men's team currently compete in State League 3 South-East. The women's team play in State League 2 South East. The men's and women's teams play home games at Tjilatjirrin Reserve (formerly Spring Street Reserve) or RJ Sillitoe reserve, and the Junior teams play home games at Tjilatjirrin Reserve (formerly Spring Street Reserve). The clubs home kit is a maroon red with white and light blue stipes, made by mitre. They field junior teams from under 6 (Goalkick) all the way to under 20, and then to seniors. The men's team is coached by Vasilios 'Billy' Natsioulas, formerly a winger who most notably played for Melbourne Knights FC, South Melbourne FC, and Bentleigh Greens SC, in the National Soccer League (now National Premier Leagues). In 2023, Sandringham SC became a Platinum Club Partner of Melbourne City FC, who are owned by the City Football Group.

== History ==
Sandringham Soccer Club was founded in 1948. They played their first game in 1949. In 1973, Ex Sandringham player Mackay scored the decisive goal against South Korea which sent Australia to its first World Cup. In 1986, Liverpool FC player Alun Evans joined Sandringham, and in a 26 games season scored 19 goals, following up with 2 goals in 1987. He originally came to Australia to play for South Melbourne FC. In 1996 Sandringham entered their first Girls team (U16's). In 2001, part of the Bayside Cup was reimagined as the Castlefield Cup, at Spring Street Reserve. The inaugural cup had 8 teams enter; in 2019 there were over 64 teams taking part with over 720 participants. In 2006 a new pavilion was built followed by a grand opening. In 2008 over 60's was announced and in 2009 Spring Street (Or Tulip Street) Reserve was renamed to Tjilatjirrin Reserve as part of NAIDOC (National Aboriginal and Islander Day Observance Committee) Week Tjilatjirrin (pronounced Chil-a-chir-rin) means to play together. The name acknowledges the Boon Wurrung as the traditional owners of the area now known as Bayside. In 2013 the women's side scored their first NPL win against South Melbourne FC. 2017 came the ABC show Mustangs FC who filmed at the reserve and in 2018 the surface at Tjilatjirrin Reserve was redeveloped. In 2020 the clubhouse was redeveloped. In 2023, the men's team finished second in Men's State League 4 South. This earned them the chance to gain promotion to State League 3 by participating in the play-offs. In round one, Sandringham defeated Waverley Wanderers FC 3-2, allowing them to progress to the second and final round of qualification for promotion. In round two, Sandringham defeated Monbulk Rangers SC 3-1, earning them promotion to State League 3 South-East for the 2024 season, where they finished fifth.

== Australia Cup ==
Formerly the FFA Cup, Sandringham compete in the nationwide knockout cup competition. In 2020, Sandringham played in round 1 of the competition, beating Glenroy Lions FC 2-0. In round 2, they lost 3-1 to Barwon SC. In 2021, they were knocked out in the first round by Greenvale United SC. In 2022 Sandringham beat Thornbury Athletic FC 6-2 in round one of the Australia Cup. In round 2, Sandringham were victorious against Springvale City SC, beating them 2-0. This meant that Sandringham qualified for third round of the competition, their best result in many years. In round 3, Sandringham were leading 1-0 against Brimbank Stallions FC when the game was postponed due to an injury, at the time Brimbank Stallions FC were 3 leagues above Sandringham. When the game resumed, Sandringham lost 1-3, despite them keeping Brimbank scoreless for 80 minutes. In 2023, Sandringham were knocked out by Monbulk Rangers SC in the first round, losing 4-1. In 2024, Sandringham were level with Riversdale SC after added time at a score of 3-3, before Riversdale defeated Sandringham 7-6 in the penalty shootout, eliminating Sandringham in the first round for the second year running.

FFA/Australia Cup Football Victoria Preliminary Rounds (Dockerty Cup) results (2017 onwards)
	Result	Wins	Losses	Goals Scored	Goals Conceded
FFA Cup 2017	Round 1	0	1	0	5
FFA Cup 2018	Round 1	0	1	1	2
FFA Cup 2019	Round 1	0	1	1	5
FFA Cup 2020	Round 2	1	1	3	3
FFA Cup 2021	Round 1	0	1	1	4
Australia Cup 2022	Round 3	2	1	9	5
Australia Cup 2023	Round 1	0	1	1	4
Australia Cup 2024	Round 1	0	1	3 (6)	3 (7)
