= Football South Coast =

- Founded: 2008
- Country: Australia
- Number of clubs: 27
- Level on pyramid: Regional Level 1. State Level 3-5. National Level 4-7.
- Domestic cup(s): Illawarra Premier League, Bert Bampton Cup, Australia Cup
- Website: Official Website
- Current: 2026

Football South Coast is a governing body and soccer competition based in the Illawarra and South Coast regions of New South Wales. All competitions and soccer activity of Football South Coast is under control of Football New South Wales.

There are 3 Premier Leagues at the senior levels, followed by community leagues ranging from divisions 1-4.

== Teams and structure ==
=== Premier League 1 ===
Twelve (12) clubs compete in the 2026 Men's Premier League 1 in First Grade, Reserve Grade and Youth Grade.

- Albion Park White Eagles
- Berkeley Sports
- Bulli FC
- Coniston FC
- Cringila Lions
- Helensburgh Thistle
- Port Kembla
- Shellharbour FC
- South Coast United
- Tarrawanna Blueys
- Wollongong Olympic
- Wollongong United

=== Premier League 2 ===
Ten (10) clubs compete in the 2026 Men's Premier League 2 across three competitions (First, Reserve and Youth).

- Balgownie Rangers
- Corrimal Rangers
- Fernhill Foxes
- Gerringong Breakers
- Oak Flats Falcons
- Picton Rangers
- Shoalhaven FC
- Thirroul Thunder
- Unanderra Hearts
- University of Wollongong FC

=== Premier League 3 ===
- Nine (9) clubs compete in the 2026 Men's Premier League 3 across two competitions, (First, Reserve).

=== Women's Leagues ===
==== Premier League ====
Seven (7) teams compete in the 2025 The Fraternity Club Premier League Women's.

- Bulli FC
- Coniston FC
- Shellharbour JFC
- Shoalhaven Association
- Thirroul JFC
- University of Wollongong FC
- Woonona Sharks FC

The Women's leagues also comprise all age divisions, youth league and Over 30's competition.

=== Junior Leagues ===
- Competition leagues for players 12 up to 18 allocated into age / divisions and Girls divisions
- Mini Roo format for players 5 to 11.

== History ==
Football South Coast (FSC) was established in 2008 as a unification of all soccer associations and governing bodies in the area. This was the result of Football NSW desire to organise and manage all regions within its borders effectively. The merger involved five key associations: Illawarra Football Association (IFA), Illawarra Junior Football Association (IJFA), Illawarra Amateur Football Association (IAFA), Illawarra Women's Football Association (IWFA), and the Referee's Association. These bodies have been dissolved to make way for FSC. The Wollongong Wolves and Illawarra Stingrays are separate clubs which participate in State League competitions run by Football NSW.

== Councils ==
There are five main councils of Football South Coast. They are the Men's, Women's, Junior's, Community League and Referee's.

== See also ==
- Illawarra Rugby League
- Group 7 Rugby League
- Illawarra Rugby Union
- AFL South Coast
- South Coast Open
