= 2022 Australia Cup preliminary rounds =

Qualification rounds for 2022 season of Australian soccer competition

Tournament details
- Country: Australia
- Teams: 750

The 2022 Australia Cup preliminary rounds were the qualifying competition to decide 24 of the 32 teams to take part in the 2022 Australia Cup. The competition commenced in February and was completed in October.

Initially known during the planning of the preliminary rounds as the FFA Cup, the renaming of the competition was announced during the 2021 FFA Cup Final.

== Schedule ==
The fixtures for the competition are as follows.

Round	Number of fixtures	Clubs	A-League	ACT	NSW	NNSW	NT	QLD	SA	TAS	VIC	WA
First round	52	750 → 698	–	–	–			–			11–13 Feb	–
Second round	152 + 70 byes	698 → 546	–	–	6–22 Mar	19 Feb–20 Mar		11–25 Feb			18–20 Feb	25–27 Feb
Third round	190 + 10 byes	546 → 356	–	26 Feb–6 Mar	22 Mar–7 Apr	26 Feb–29 Mar		18 Feb–26 Mar	18–29 Mar	11–16 Mar	4–11 Mar	19 Mar–14 Apr
Fourth round	168 + 6 byes	356 → 188	–	19–23 Mar	13 Apr–12 May	12 Mar–4 May	29 Mar–30 Apr	26 Feb–6 Apr	15–17 Apr	16–18 Apr	22 Mar–5 Apr	23 April–4 May
Fifth round	88	188 → 100	–	26 Apr–11 May	11–25 May	12 Mar–1 Jun	26 Apr–10 May	5 Mar–1 Jun	6–8 May	7–17 May	13–27 Apr	17–19 May
Sixth round	44	100 → 56	–	17–18 May	31 May–7 Jun	11 Jun	17 May–4 Jun	21 May–15 Jun	24–31 May	28 May	10–18 May	7–8 Jun
Seventh round	22	56 → 34	–	4 Jun	14–16 Jun	22 Jun	14 Jun	21 Jun-2 Jul	21–22 Jun	13 Jun	7–15 Jun	21 Jun
Play-off round	2	34 → 32	12–13 May	–	–	–	–	–	–	–	–	–

- Some round dates in respective Federations overlap due to separate scheduling of zones.

== Format ==
The preliminary rounds structures are as follows, and refer to the different levels in the unofficial Australian soccer league system:

- First round:

- 104 Victorian clubs level 8 and below entered this stage.

- Second round:

- 120 New South Wales clubs level 6 and below entered this stage.
- 48 Northern New South Wales clubs level 4 and below entered this stage.
- 83 Queensland clubs (level 5 and below) entered this stage.
- 100 Victorian clubs (52 from the previous round and 48 teams from levels 5 and 6) entered this stage.
- 23 Western Australian clubs from level 5 and below, including from regional leagues, entered this stage.

- Third round:

- 12 Australian Capital Territory clubs from level 3 and below entered this stage. (Note: The initial draw by Capital Football resulted in a format where the team with the best record in the 2021 FFA Cup preliminary rounds would receive a bye to the sixth round. There was a re-draw the same day, based on a different format, which resulted in the top four seeded Capital Premier League clubs from 2021 given a Bye in the third round.)
- 88 New South Wales Clubs (66 from the previous round and 22 teams from levels 4–5) entered this stage.
- 42 Northern New South Wales clubs (33 from the previous round and 11 level 3) entered this stage.
- 83 Queensland clubs (50 from the previous round and 33 teams from level 4 and below) entered this stage.
- 40 South Australian clubs from level 3 and below entered this stage.
- 10 Tasmanian clubs from level 3 and below entered this stage.
- 79 Victorian clubs (55 from the previous round and 24 teams from level 5) entered this stage.
- 42 Western Australian clubs (18 from the previous round and 24 teams from levels 3 and 4) entered this stage.

- Fourth round:

- 16 Australian Capital Territory clubs (4 from the previous round and 12 teams from levels 2–3) entered this stage.
- 64 New South Wales Clubs (44 from the previous round and 20 teams from levels 2–3) entered this stage.
- 32 Northern New South Wales clubs (21 from the previous round and 11 level 2) entered this stage.
- 11 Northern Territory clubs (7 from Norzone (Darwin) and 4 from FICA (Alice Springs)) from levels 2–3 entered this stage.
- 64 Queensland clubs (42 from the previous round and 22 teams from level 2 and 3) entered this stage.
- 32 South Australian clubs (21 from the previous round and 11 teams from level 2) entered this stage.
- 16 Tasmanian clubs (6 from the previous round and 10 teams from level 2 and 3) entered this stage.
- 75 Victorian clubs (40 from the previous round and 35 teams from levels 2–4) entered this stage.
- 32 Western Australian clubs (21 from the previous round and 11 teams from level 2) entered this stage.

- Fifth round:

- 8 Australian Capital Territory clubs progressed to this stage.
- 32 New South Wales clubs progressed to this stage.
- 16 Northern New South Wales clubs progressed to this stage.
- 8 Northern Territory clubs (6 from the previous round and 2 Norzone (Darwin) teams from level 2) entered this stage.
- 32 Queensland clubs progressed to this stage.
- 16 South Australian clubs progressed to this stage.
- 8 Tasmanian clubs progressed to this stage.
- 40 Victorian clubs progressed to this stage.
- 16 Western Australian clubs progressed to this stage.

- Sixth round:

- 4 Australian Capital Territory clubs progressed to this stage.
- 16 New South Wales clubs progressed to this stage.
- 8 Northern New South Wales clubs progressed to this stage.
- 4 Northern Territory clubs progressed to this stage.
- 16 Queensland clubs progressed to this stage.
- 8 South Australian clubs progressed to this stage.
- 4 Tasmanian clubs progressed to this stage.
- 20 Victorian clubs progressed to this stage.
- 8 Western Australian clubs progressed to this stage.

- Seventh round:

- 2 Australian Capital Territory clubs progressed to this stage, which doubled as the Final of the Federation Cup.
- 8 New South Wales clubs progressed to this stage. The 4 winners also qualified for the final rounds of the Waratah Cup.
- 4 Northern New South Wales clubs progressed to this stage.
- 2 Northern Territory clubs progressed to this stage, which doubled as the Final of the NT Australia Cup.
- 8 Queensland clubs progressed to this stage; 2 from Central and North Queensland, and 6 from South East Queensland.
- 4 South Australian clubs progressed to this stage. The 2 winners qualified for the Grand Final of the Federation Cup.
- 2 Tasmanian clubs progressed to this stage, which doubled as the Grand Final of the Milan Lakoseljac Cup.
- 10 Victorian clubs progressed to this stage. The 5 winners also qualified for the final rounds of the Dockerty Cup.
- 4 Western Australian clubs progressed to this stage. The 2 winners also qualified for the Final of the Football West State Cup.

- Play-off round:

- The four lowest-ranked teams in the 2021–22 A-League Men played-off for two spots in the Round of 32.

== Key to abbreviations ==
Federation	Zone
ACT = Australian Capital Territory	
NSW = New South Wales	
NNSW = Northern New South Wales	NTH = North; STH = South
NT = Northern Territory	ASP = Alice Springs; DAR = Darwin
QLD = Queensland	CQ = Central Queensland; FNQ = Far North Queensland; MR = Mackay Region; NQ = North Queensland; SEQ = South East Queensland; WB = Wide Bay
SA = South Australia	
TAS = Tasmania	
VIC = Victoria	
WA = Western Australia	

== First round ==
Fed.	Zone	Tie no	Home team (Tier)	Score	Away team (Tier)
VIC	–	1	Brunswick Zebras (8)	3–2†	Greenvale United (8)
VIC	–	2	North Melbourne Athletic (8)	3–10	Swinburne FC (10)
VIC	–	3	Endeavour United (8)	5–3	Lyndale United (8)
VIC	–	4	Meadow Park Eagles (9)	3–0	Macedon Blues United (9)
VIC	–	5	Dandenong South (8)	0–2	Hampton Park United Sparrows (9)
VIC	–	6	Maribyrnong Greens (9)	1–7	Plenty Valley Lions (8)
VIC	–	7	Watsonia Heights (8)	4–2†	Bendigo City (9)
VIC	–	8	Chelsea (8)	2–0	St Kilda SC (9)
VIC	–	9	FC Noble Hurricanes (8)	0–3	West Point (9)
VIC	–	10	Alphington (9)	w/o	Old Xaverians (8)
VIC	–	11	Mildura City (10)	w/o	Bell Park (8)
VIC	–	12	Lara United (9)	4–0	Kings Domain (8)
VIC	–	13	Thornbury Athletic (8)	2–6	Sandringham (8)
VIC	–	14	Surf Coast (8)	7–1	Rosebud (9)
VIC	–	15	FC Tullamarine (9)	3–1	Somerville Eagles (8)
VIC	–	16	Casey Panthers (9)	2–6	Melton Phoenix (9)
VIC	–	17	Glenroy Lions (9)	2–0	Spring Gully United (10)
VIC	–	18	Melbourne University (8)	w/o	South East United (9)
VIC	–	19	Manningham Juventus (8)	0–0†	West Preston (8)
Manningham Juventus advance 5–3 on penalties
VIC	–	20	White Star Dandenong (9)	4–2	St Kevin's Old Boys (9)
VIC	–	21	Lilydale Montrose United (9)	0–7	Shepparton South (10)
VIC	–	22	Surfside Waves (9)	w/o	Balmoral (9)
VIC	–	23	Roxburgh Park United (9)	1–10	Keilor Wolves (8)
VIC	–	24	Mount Martha SC (9)	0–3	Glen Waverley (9)
VIC	–	25	Baxter (8)	1–2	Mount Waverley City (9)
VIC	–	26	Maidstone United (9)	w/o	Moonee Valley Knights (9)

Fed.	Zone	Tie no	Home team (Tier)	Score	Away team (Tier)
VIC	–	27	East Bentleigh Strikers (8)	w/o	Tatura (10)
VIC	–	28	Chisholm United (8)	9–0	Wyndham (9)
VIC	–	29	Croydon City Arrows (8)	1–2	East Kew (9)
VIC	–	30	Bunyip District (9)	w/o	Sandown Lions (8)
VIC	–	31	Westside Strikers Caroline Springs (8)	w/o	Seaford United (8)
VIC	–	32	Truganina Hornets (8)	1–0	Yarra Jets (9)
VIC	–	33	Keysborough (8)	1–3	Monash City Villarreal (8)
VIC	–	34	Darebin United (8)	2–1	Spring Hills (8)
VIC	–	35	Uni Hill Eagles (8)	4–2	Old Ivanhoe (9)
VIC	–	36	Springvale City (8)	8–0	Warrnambool Wolves (10)
VIC	–	37	Keon Park (9)	w/o	Riversdale (8)
VIC	–	38	Mitchell Rangers (9)	w/o	FC Eaglehawk (10)
VIC	–	39	Aspendale (9)	5–0	Deakin Ducks (9)
VIC	–	40	La Trobe University (8)	w/o	Old Trinity Grammarians (9)
VIC	–	41	Endeavour Hills (9)	w/o	Golden Plains (8)
VIC	–	42	Bundoora United (9)	2–1	Melbourne City FC (8)
VIC	–	43	Barton United (9)	0–3	Northern Falcons (8)
VIC	–	44	Ballarat SC (9)	0–1	Old Melburnians (9)
VIC	–	45	Noble Park (8)	w/o	Barnstoneworth United (8)
VIC	–	46	Gisborne (8)	10–1	Doreen United (10)
VIC	–	47	Knox United (9)	3–5	Barwon (9)
VIC	–	48	Waverley Wanderers (8)	1–0†	Boronia (9)
VIC	–	49	Albert Park (9)	1–6	Ringwood City (9)
VIC	–	50	Epsom (10)	1–2	Mentone SC (9)
VIC	–	51	Glen Eira (10)	1–8	Laverton (8)
VIC	–	52	Pakenham United (9)	3–1	Breakwater Eagles SC (10)

Notes

- w/o = Walkover
- † = After Extra Time

== Second round ==
Fed.	Zone	Tie no	Home team (Tier)	Score	Away team (Tier)
New South Wales
NSW	–	1	Port Kembla (6)	2–6	Waverley Old Boys (6)
NSW	–	2	Western Condors (6)	1–4	Gladesville Ravens (7)
NSW	–	3	Waratahs FC (-)	3–2	Roselea FC (7)
NSW	–	4	Randwick City (-)	5–0	Carlton Rovers (-)
NSW	–	5	Ryde Saints United (6)	0–6	Lane Cove (-)
NSW	–	6	Dubbo Macquarie United (-)	4–3	Rouse Hill Rams (-)
NSW	–	7	Berkeley Vale (6)	3–1	Kariong United (6)
NSW	–	8	Panorama FC (-)	2–3	Banksia Tigers (-)
NSW	–	9	Horsley Park United (-)	2–6	Liverpool Rangers (-)
NSW	–	10	Peakhurst United (-)	2–5	Wollongong United (6)
NSW	–	11	Liverpool Olympics (6)	0–3	Unanderra Hearts (7)
NSW	–	12	FC Eagles Sydney (6)	0–6	Tarrawanna Blueys (6)
NSW	–	13	Lugarno FC (-)	3–1	Picton Rovers (6)
NSW	–	14	LFC Sports (-)	w/o	Padstow Hornets (-)
NSW	–	15	Pagewood Botany (-)	0–1	Wyoming FC (6)
NSW	–	16	Warradale FC (-)	3–0	Lithgow Workmens Club (-)
NSW	–	17	Norwest FC (-)	w/o	Leeton United (-)
NSW	–	18	Kenthurst FC (-)	6–1	Emu Plains (-)
NSW	–	19	Albion Park White Eagles (6)	`15–0	Liverpool Spears (-)
NSW	–	20	Quakers Hill Junior (-)	2–2†	Kellyville Kolts (-)
Quakers Hill Junior advance 4–2 on penalties
NSW	–	21	Burwood FC (-)	4–0	Glenwood Redbacks (-)
NSW	–	22	Coogee United (6)	3–0	Baulkham Hills (-)
NSW	–	23	Winston Hills (-)	0–2	Doonside Hawks (-)
NSW	–	24	Putney Rangers (7)	2–0	Roselands FC (-)
NSW	–	25	Moorebank Sports (6)	2–1	Eastern Creek Pioneer (-)
NSW	–	26	Narrabeen FC (-)	4–1	Sydney Rangers (-)
NSW	–	27	Kissing Point (-)	1–3	Connells Point Rovers (-)
NSW	–	28	Arncliffe Aurora (-)	8–1	Glory FC (-)
NSW	–	29	Forest Killarney (-)	5–1	Marayong FC (-)
NSW	–	30	Sans Souci (-)	1–0	Georges River (-)
NSW	–	31	Mudgee Gulgong Wolves (-)	2–2†	Brighton Heat (-)
Mudgee Gulgong Wolves advance 4–2 on penalties
NSW	–	32	Woonona Sharks (6)	3–0	Young Lions (-)
NSW	–	33	Terrigal United (6)	0–2	The Ponds (-)
NSW	–	34	Cringila Lions (6)	1–2	Forest Rangers (-)
NSW	–	35	Kemps Creek United (6)	3–0	Bonnet Bay (-)
NSW	–	36	Willoughby Dalleys (-)	10–1	St. Ives FC (-)
NSW	–	37	Greenacre Eagles (-)	4–0	Balmain & District (-)
NSW	–	38	Lowland Wanderers (-)	0–1	Fairfield Bulls (6)
NSW	–	39	Austral SC (-)	0–2	Springwood United (-)
NSW	–	40	Hurlstone Park Wanderers (-)	7–1	Hills Spirit (-)
NSW	–	41	Barnstoneworth United (-)	2–1	Thirroul Thunder (7)
NSW	–	42	Turramurra United (-)	0–5	Glebe Gorillas (-)
NSW	–	43	Ourimbah United (7)	0–4	Sydney CBD (6)
NSW	–	44	Narellan Rangers (-)	0–2	Glebe Wanderers (-)
NSW	–	45	Lindfield FC (-)	3–1	Australian Catholic University (-)
NSW	–	46	Wollongong Olympic (6)	7–0	Glenmore Park (-)
NSW	–	47	Gerringong Breakers (-)	0–6	Southern Ettalong (6)
NSW	–	48	University of Wollongong (7)	1–5	Cronulla Seagulls (-)
NSW	–	49	North Ryde (7)	0–2	Enfield Rovers (-)
NSW	–	50	Phoenix FC (-)	3–0	North Rocks (-)
NSW	–	51	Hurstville City Minotaurs (-)	3–1	Holroyd Rangers (-)
NSW	–	52	Macquarie Dragons (6)	12–1	Albion Park City Eagles (-)
NSW	–	53	Parklea SFC (-)	1–0	Harrington United (-)
NSW	–	54	Woongarrah Wildcats (6)	3–4†	Belrose Terrey Hills (-)
Northern New South Wales
NNSW	NTH	55	Coffs City United (4)	5–3	Lismore Richmond Rovers (4)
NNSW	NTH	56	Macleay Valley Rangers (4)	2–4	Coffs Coast Tigers (4)
NNSW	STH	57	Kurri Kurri Junior (7)	1–2	Lake Macquarie Junior (6)
NNSW	STH	58	Hamilton Azzurri (4)	3–2	Bolwarra Lorn JSC (6)
NNSW	STH	59	Cardiff City (4)	w/o	Morisset United (7)
NNSW	STH	60	Dudley Redhead United Senior (4)	3–1	Medowie FC (7)
NNSW	STH	61	Barnsley United (6)	1–2	Westlakes Wildcats (5)
NNSW	STH	62	Swansea FC (4)	4–3	Kotara South (4)
NNSW	STH	63	Stockton Sharks (5)	2–0	Merewether Advance (5)
NNSW	STH	66	Newcastle University Men's (5)	1–0	Kahibah Rams (6)
NNSW	STH	67	Nelson Bay FC (5)	4–1	North United Wolves (5)
NNSW	STH	68	Minmi Wanderers (6)	1–1†	Mayfield United Seniors (4)
Mayfield United Seniors advance 4–3 on penalties
NNSW	STH	69	Newcastle Croatia (7)	0–1	Warners Bay FC (4)
Queensland
QLD	WB	70	Doon Villa (5)	2–0	Kawungan Sandy Straits Jets (5)
QLD	CQ	71	Frenchville FC (5)	w/o	Bluebirds United (5)
QLD	SEQ	72	Centenary Stormers (5)	0–4	Ridge Hills United (8)
QLD	SEQ	73	Mooroondu FC (8)	7–2	Rockville Rovers (5)
QLD	SEQ	74	Nambour-Yandina United (5)	5–2†	Ormeau All Stars (6)
QLD	SEQ	75	Toowong FC (5)	3–1	Willowburn FC (7)
QLD	SEQ	76	Runaway Bay SC (5)	1–0	Burleigh Heads Bulldogs (5)
QLD	SEQ	77	Legends FC (6)	2–3†	Springfield United (7)
QLD	SEQ	78	Logan Metro (6)	7–0	Coolum FC (5)
QLD	SEQ	79	The Lakes FC (5)	8–0	Gatton Redbacks (5)

Fed.	Zone	Tie no	Home team (Tier)	Score	Away team (Tier)
QLD	SEQ	80	New Farm United (6)	w/o	Ipswich City Bulls (6)
QLD	SEQ	81	Annerley FC (6)	6–1	St. Alban's FC (5)
QLD	SEQ	82	Bardon Latrobe (7)	0–6	Westside Grovely (7)
QLD	SEQ	83	Bilambil Terranora (6)	2–5	Logan Roos (8)
QLD	SEQ	84	Slacks Creek (6)	1–4	North Pine (6)
QLD	SEQ	85	Tarragindi Tigers FC (7)	3–4	Kawana FC (5)
QLD	SEQ	86	Yeronga Eagles FC (8)	3–1	West Wanderers FC (5)
QLD	SEQ	87	AC Carina FC (6)	0–2	Brisbane Knights (6)
QLD	SEQ	88	Nerang Eagles (5)	3–2	Jimboomba United (7)
QLD	SEQ	89	Teviot Downs (8)	0–2	North Brisbane FC (6)
QLD	SEQ	90	Gympie United (5)	2–1	Tallebudgera Valley (5)
QLD	SEQ	91	Musgrave (6)	4–3	Western Spirit (5)
QLD	SEQ	92	Oxley United (7)	0–3	Mt Gravatt Hawks (5)
QLD	SEQ	93	Narangba Eagles (7)	1–4	Pine Hills FC (5)
QLD	SEQ	94	Old Bridge FC (8)	4–1	Park Ridge Panthers (8)
QLD	SEQ	95	Pine Rivers Athletic (7)	3–1	Deception Bay FC (8)
QLD	SEQ	96	Woombye Snakes (5)	5–0	Clairvaux FC (7)
QLD	SEQ	97	Logan Village Falcons (8)	0–6	Redcliffe Dolphins (6)
QLD	SEQ	98	Newmarket FC (5)	0–3	Southport Warriors (5)
QLD	SEQ	99	Broadbeach United (5)	3–0	Highfields FC (5)
QLD	SEQ	100	Bethania Rams (8)	1–0	Pacific Pines (6)
QLD	SEQ	101	Acacia Ridge (5)	1–1†	Ripley Valley FC (6)
Acacia Ridge advance 4–3 on penalties
QLD	SEQ	102	Australian Catholic University QLD (8)	1–5	UQFC (5)
Victoria
VIC	–	103	Monash University (7)	2–0	Truganina Hornets (8)
VIC	–	104	East Kew (9)	2–3	Bayside Argonauts (7)
VIC	–	105	Pakenham United (9)	1–2†	White Star Dandenong (9)
VIC	–	106	Bundoora United (9)	2–3	Manningham Juventus (8)
VIC	–	107	Old Scotch (6)	1–0	Plenty Valley Lions (8)
VIC	–	108	Western Suburbs (6)	2–3	Hampton Park United Sparrows (9)
VIC	–	109	FC Eaglehawk (10)	1–4	Fawkner (7)
VIC	–	100	Westgate (6)	5–3	Darebin United (8)
VIC	–	111	Meadow Park (9)	2–0	Northern Falcons (8)
VIC	–	112	Moonee Ponds United (7)	6–3	Alphington (9)
VIC	–	113	Frankston Pines (7)	1–1†	Albion Rovers (6)
Frankston Pines advance 8–7 on penalties
VIC	–	114	Lara United (9)	1–1†	Chelsea (8)
Lara United advance 5–4 on penalties
VIC	–	115	Mooroolbark (6)	2–4†	Riversdale (8)
VIC	–	116	Sandringham (8)	2–0	Springvale City (8)
VIC	–	117	Old Melburnians (9)	0–2	Craigieburn City (7)
VIC	–	118	Ringwood City (8)	1–4	Monash City Villarreal (8)
VIC	–	119	Barwon (9)	1–0	Chisholm United (8)
VIC	–	120	Westvale (7)	4–0	Endeavour United (8)
VIC	–	121	Bunyip District (9)	1–4	Elwood City (7)
VIC	–	122	Berwick City (6)	5–0	Middle Park (7)
VIC	–	123	Mentone SC (9)	0–4	Moreland United (6)
VIC	–	124	Brunswick Zebras (8)	0–1	West Point (9)
VIC	–	125	Laverton (8)	1–2	Whitehorse United (7)
VIC	–	126	Barnstoneworth United (8)	1–3	Heidelberg Eagles (7)
VIC	–	127	Hampton East Brighton (7)	2–4	Epping City (6)
VIC	–	128	Heatherton United (6)	2–1	Geelong Rangers (6)
VIC	–	129	Peninsula Strikers (6)	3–1	North Melbourne Athletic (8)
VIC	–	130	Lalor United (6)	3–0	Mount Waverley City (9)
VIC	–	131	Glen Waverley (9)	1–4	Moonee Valley Knights (9)
VIC	–	132	Diamond Valley United (7)	2–0	Tatura (10)
VIC	–	133	Doncaster Rovers (6)	3–1	FC Tullamarine (9)
VIC	–	134	Glenroy Lions (9)	1–0	Balmoral (9)
VIC	–	135	Mildura City (10)	1–1†	Waverley Wanderers (8)
Mildura City advance 5–4 on penalties
VIC	–	136	Melton Phoenix (9)	1–0	Gisborne (8)
VIC	–	137	Brandon Park (6)	2–0	La Trobe University (8)
VIC	–	138	Golden Plains (8)	w/o	Point Cook (7)
VIC	–	139	Aspendale (9)	3–4	Surf Coast (8)
VIC	–	140	North Caulfield (6)	2–3	Western Eagles (7)
VIC	–	141	South Yarra (7)	0–0†	Shepparton South (10)
South Yarra advance 5–4 on penalties
VIC	–	142	Brighton SC (7)	0–1	Collingwood City (6)
VIC	–	143	Keilor Wolves (8)	1–0	Mill Park (6)
VIC	–	144	Rowville Eagles (7)	2–0	Melbourne University (8)
VIC	–	145	Sebastopol Vikings (7)	w/o	Altona North (7)
VIC	–	146	Noble Park United (7)	1–2	Upfield (6)
VIC	–	147	Uni Hill Eagles (8)	3–3†	Westside Strikers Caroline Springs (8)
Uni Hill Eagles advance 6–5 on penalties
Western Australia
WA	–	148	Jaguar FC (5)	3–0	Wembley Downs (5)
WA	–	149	Ballajura AFC (8)	5–0	Port Kennedy (6)
WA	–	150	Tuart Hill (12)	w/o	Football Margaret River (10)
WA	–	151	Maddington White City (5)	3–1	Maccabi SC (6)
WA	–	152	North Perth United (5)	1–5	North Beach (6)

Notes

- w/o = Walkover
- † = After Extra Time
- NSW Byes – Bulli FC (6), Castle Hill RSL Rockets (-), Como Jannali (-), Cooks River Titans (-), Dundas United (-), Eschol Park (-), Fairfield Patrician Brothers (6), Gunners SC (-), Gwandalan Summerland Point (7), Kiama Quarriers (7), Knox United (-), Kogarah Waratah (-).
- NNSW Byes – Bellingen FC (-), Camden Haven Redbacks (-), Charlestown Junior (7), Coutts Crossing Cougars (-), Iona FC (-), Kempsey Saints (-), Mayfield United Junior (6), Metford Cobras (7), Moore Creek (-), Nambucca Strikers (-), Newcastle Suns (4), Northern Storm (-), Oxley Vale Attunga (-), Port Macquarie Saints (-), South Maitland (6), Souths United (-), Taree Wildcats (-), Wingham Warriors (-).
- QLD Byes – Fraser Flames (5), Across The Waves FC (5), United Park Eagles (5), Central FC (5), Capricorn Coast (5), Nerimbera FC (5), Robina City (5), Noosa Lions (5), Kingscliff District (5), Moggill (7), The Gap (5), St. George Willawong (5), Bribie Island Tigers (8), Bayside United (5), Kangaroo Point Rovers (7), Brighton Bulldogs (8), Maroochydore (5).
- VIC Byes – Watsonia Heights (8), Skye United (6), Knox City (6), Williamstown (7), Altona East Phoenix (6), Hume United (6), Ashburton United (7), Monbulk Rangers (6), Sunbury United (7), Hoppers Crossing (6).
- WA Byes – Albany Caledonian (10), Busselton City (10), Chipolopolo FC (10), Emerald FC (5), Greyhounds CSC (10), Hamersley Rovers (5), Joondanna Blues (10), Kwinana United (5), Northern City (9), Perth AFC (8), Riverside CFC (10), South Perth United (6), Yanchep United (9).

== Third round ==
Fed.	Zone	Tie no	Home team (Tier)	Score	Away team (Tier)
Australian Capital Territory
ACT	–	1	Woden Valley (4)	3–2	Majura FC (7)
ACT	–	2	Weston Molonglo (3)	2–1	Burns FC (6)
ACT	–	3	Belnorth FC (4)	4–0	UC Stars (4)
ACT	–	4	Brindabella Blues (3)	1–2	Queanbeyan City (3)
New South Wales
NSW	–	5	Hurstville City Minotaurs (-)	1–3	Waverley Old Boys (6)
NSW	–	6	Eschol Park (-)	1–4	Banksia Tigers (-)
NSW	–	7	Dubbo Macquarie United (-)	w/o	Wollongong Olympic (6)
NSW	–	8	Canterbury Bankstown (4)	1–0	Woonona Sharks (6)
NSW	–	9	South Coast Flame (5)	0–1	Inter Lions (4)
NSW	–	10	LFC Sports (-)	1–7	Albion Park White Eagles (6)
NSW	–	11	Coogee United (6)	10–1	Mudgee Gulgong Wolves (-)
NSW	–	12	Lane Cove (-)	2–1	Belrose Terrey Hills (-)
NSW	–	13	Quakers Hill Junior (-)	4–1	Springwood United (-)
NSW	–	14	Inner West Hawks (4)	6–2	Gunners SC (-)
NSW	–	15	Forest Killarney (-)	4–5	Bankstown City (4)
NSW	–	16	Southern Ettalong (6)	0–1	Wollongong United (6)
NSW	–	17	Fraser Park (5)	2–2†	Hurlstone Park Wanderers (-)
Fraser Park advance 5–4 on penalties
NSW	–	18	Sydney CBD (6)	12–0	Gwandalan Summerland Point (7)
NSW	–	19	Dulwich Hill (4)	2–1	Como Jannali (-)
NSW	–	20	Burwood FC (-)	1–11	Narrabeen FC (-)
NSW	–	21	The Ponds (-)	2–3†	Nepean FC (5)
NSW	–	22	Kiama Quarriers (-)	0–3	Hurstville ZFC (5)
NSW	–	23	Putney Rangers (7)	1–3	Knox United (-)
NSW	–	24	Cronulla Seagulls (-)	2–3†	Rydalmere Lions (4)
NSW	–	25	Hawkesbury City (5)	1–5	Prospect United (5)
NSW	–	26	Parramatta FC (5)	2–1†	Gladesville Ryde Magic (4)
NSW	–	27	Barnstoneworth United (-)	2–3	Phoenix FC (-)
NSW	–	28	Waratahs FC (-)	2–2†	Central Coast United (4)
Central Coast United advance 3–1 on penalties
NSW	–	29	Western Rage (5)	w/o	Kemps Creek United (6)
NSW	–	30	Kogarah Waratah (-)	0–0†	Willoughby Dalleys (-)
Willoughby Dalleys advance 4–3 on penalties
NSW	–	31	Doonside Hawks (-)	1–4	Castle Hill RSL Rockets (-)
NSW	–	32	Enfield Rovers (-)	3–2†	Camden Tigers (5)
NSW	–	33	Randwick City (-)	1–1†	Sans Souci (-)
Randwick City advance 4–1 on penalties
NSW	–	34	Warradale FC (-)	3–4	Fairfield Patrician Brothers (-)
NSW	–	35	Norwest FC (-)	3–1	Glebe Wanderers (-)
NSW	–	36	Berkeley Vale (6)	0–2	Glebe Gorillas (-)
NSW	–	37	Bulli FC (6)	3–5	UNSW (5)
NSW	–	38	Connells Point Rovers (-)	6–0	Cooks River Titans (-)
NSW	–	39	Bankstown United (4)	1–2	Sydney Uni (4)
NSW	–	40	Lugarno FC (-)	2–4	Lindfield FC (-)
NSW	–	41	Unanderra Hearts (7)	12–0	Dundas United (-)
NSW	–	42	Greenacre Eagles (-)	2–1	Macarthur Rams (4)
NSW	–	43	Tarrawanna Blueys (6)	2–1	Kenthurst FC (-)
NSW	–	44	Arncliffe Aurora (-)	3–0	Gladesville Ravens (7)
NSW	–	45	Parklea SFC (-)	0–7	Dunbar Rovers (4)
NSW	–	46	Liverpool Rangers (-)	1–7	Wyoming FC (6)
NSW	–	47	Forest Rangers (-)	6–1	Fairfield Bulls (6)
NSW	–	48	Moorebank Sports (6)	1–2	Macquarie Dragons (6)
Northern New South Wales
NNSW	NTH	49	Boambee Bombers (-)	2–2†	Northern Storm (-)
Boambee Bombers advance 11–10 on penalties
NNSW	NTH	50	Nambucca Strikers (-)	0–2	Iona FC (-)
NNSW	NTH	51	Coffs Coast Tigers (4)	10–0	Taree Wildcats (-)
NNSW	NTH	52	Port Saints (-)	1–0	Kempsey Saints (-)
NNSW	NTH	53	Camden Haven Redbacks (-)	1–6	Coffs City United (-)
NNSW	NTH	54	Coutts Crossing Cougars (-)	1–2	Oxley Vale Attunga (-)
NNSW	NTH	55	Moore Creek (-)	5–0	Souths United (-)
NNSW	NTH	56	Wingham Warriors (-)	–	Bellingen FC (-)
NNSW	STH	57	Singleton Strikers (3)	1–2	Warners Bay FC (4)
NNSW	STH	58	Thornton Redbacks (3)	2–4	Cardiff City (4)
NNSW	STH	59	Newcastle University Men's (5)	3–1	Lake Macquarie Junior (-)
NNSW	STH	60	Belmont Swansea United (3)	5–1	Newcastle Suns (-)
NNSW	STH	61	Toronto Awaba Stags (3)	0–1	Dudley Redhead United Senior (4)
NNSW	STH	62	South Maitland (6)	0–4	Hamilton Azzurri (4)
NNSW	STH	63	South Cardiff (3)	2–0	Nelson Bay FC (5)
NNSW	STH	64	Mayfield United Junior (6)	1–0	Stockton Sharks (5)
NNSW	STH	65	New Lambton FC (3)	21–0	Metford Cobras (7)
NNSW	STH	66	Cessnock City Hornets (3)	5–0	Westlakes Wildcats (5)
NNSW	STH	67	Swansea FC (4)	3–2	West Wallsend (3)
NNSW	STH	68	Charlestown Junior (7)	1–5	Kahibah FC (3)
NNSW	STH	69	Mayfield United Seniors (4)	4–1	Wallsend FC (3)
Queensland
QLD	FNQ	70	Edge Hill United (5)	4–0	Marlin Coast Rangers (5)
QLD	FNQ	71	Leichhardt FC (5)	1–2	Mareeba United (5)
QLD	FNQ	72	Southside Comets (5)	3–4	Innisfail United (5)
QLD	FNQ	73	Stratford Dolphins (5)	5–1	Atherton FC (-)
QLD	NQ	74	Townsville Warriors (5)	4–0	Riverway JCU (7)
QLD	NQ	75	MA Olympic (5)	3–0	Estates FC (5)
QLD	NQ	76	Burdekin FC (5)	5–4	Rebels FC (5)
QLD	WB	77	Fraser Flames (5)	3–1	United Park Eagles (5)
QLD	WB	78	Doon Villa (5)	0–5	Across The Waves (5)
QLD	CQ	79	Nerimbera FC (5)	0–1	Central FC Gladstone (5)
QLD	CQ	80	Capricorn Coast (5)	0–9	Frenchville FC (5)
QLD	SEQ	81	Coomera Colts (4)	2–4†	North Pine (6)
QLD	SEQ	82	Wynnum Wolves (4)	0–1	Moggill FC (7)
QLD	SEQ	83	Bribie Island Tigers (8)	0–3	North Brisbane FC (6)
QLD	SEQ	84	Pine Hills FC (5)	2–0	Acacia Ridge (5)
QLD	SEQ	85	Mt Gravatt Hawks (5)	0–3	Southport Warriors (5)
QLD	SEQ	86	Woombye Snakes (5)	2–3†	Kingscliff District (5)
QLD	SEQ	87	Yeronga Eagles (8)	3–1	Logan Roos (8)
QLD	SEQ	88	Gympie United (5)	2–4	Robina City (5)
QLD	SEQ	89	Grange Thistle (4)	3–1	Brighton Bulldogs (8)
QLD	SEQ	90	The Gap (5)	1–6	Bayside United (5)
QLD	SEQ	91	Albany Creek Excelsior (4)	3–2	Magic United (4)
QLD	SEQ	92	Nerang Eagles (5)	0–14	Surfers Paradise Apollo (4)
QLD	SEQ	93	Taringa Rovers (4)	6–2	Kawana FC (5)
QLD	SEQ	94	Nambour-Yandina United (5)	5–0	Kangaroo Point Rovers (7)
QLD	SEQ	95	Samford Rangers (4)	1–3	Holland Parks Hawks (4)
QLD	SEQ	96	Brisbane Knights (6)	2–3	North Star (4)
QLD	SEQ	97	Mooroondu FC (8)	0–2	UQFC (5)

Fed.	Zone	Tie no	Home team (Tier)	Score	Away team (Tier)
QLD	SEQ	98	Musgrave (6)	4–1	Old Bridge FC (8)
QLD	SEQ	99	The Lakes FC (5)	4–1	Souths United (4)
QLD	SEQ	100	Ridge Hills United (8)	3–2	Bethania Rams (8)
QLD	SEQ	101	St. George Willawong (5)	2–1	Toowong FC (5)
QLD	SEQ	102	Springfield United (7)	2–6	Virginia United (4)
QLD	SEQ	103	Annerley FC (6)	3–1	Westside Grovely (7)
QLD	SEQ	104	Redcliffe Dolphins (6)	4–2	New Farm United (6)
QLD	SEQ	105	Broadbeach United (5)	13–0	Pine Rivers Athletic (7)
QLD	SEQ	106	Maroochydore FC (5)	1–0	Noosa Lions (5)
QLD	SEQ	107	Runaway Bay SC (5)	5–0	Logan Metro FC (6)
South Australia
SA	–	108	Playford City Patriots (3)	4–2	Western Strikers (4)
SA	–	109	Eastern United (3)	7–0	Adelaide Uni Grads Red (-)
SA	–	110	Adelaide Uni SC (3)	3–2†	Adelaide Cobras (4)
SA	–	111	Parafield Gardens (-)	7–0	Adelaide Uni Grads Blue (-)
SA	–	112	Pembroke Old Scholars (-)	1–6	The Cove (4)
SA	–	113	Modbury Vista (4)	7–1	Rostrevor Old Collegians (-)
SA	–	114	Adelaide Thunder (-)	0–6	West Adelaide (3)
SA	–	115	Pontian Eagles (4)	6–4	Old Ignatians (-)
SA	–	116	Mount Barker United (4)	2–1	Adelaide Titans (-)
SA	–	117	BOSA FC (-)	0–5	Noarlunga United (4)
SA	–	118	Ghan Kilburn City (-)	5–3†	Para Hills West (-)
SA	–	119	Modbury SC (3)	6–0	Seaford Rangers (4)
SA	–	120	Adelaide Blue Eagles (3)	4–2	Northern Demons (4)
SA	–	121	Elizabeth Downs (5)	4–0	Brahma Lodge (5)
SA	–	122	Adelaide Croatia Raiders (3)	1–2	Vipers FC (4)
SA	–	123	Gawler Eagles (4)	8–1	Elizabeth Grove (7)
SA	–	124	Adelaide Victory (3)	1–0	Fulham United (3)
SA	–	125	Para Hills Knights (3)	3–3†	Salisbury United (4)
Salisbury United advance 5–4 on penalties
SA	–	126	Adelaide Redblue Eagles (-)	0–3	Adelaide Hills Hawks (3)
Tasmania
TAS	–	127	Metro FC (3)	0–2	Taroona FC (3)
TAS	–	128	Hobart United (3)	2–1	South East United (3)
TAS	–	129	Nelson Eastern Suburbs (4)	1–4	Launceston United (3)
TAS	–	130	Northern Rangers (3)	4–0	University of Tasmania (3)
Victoria
VIC	–	131	Manningham Juventus (8)	3–1	Moreland United (6)
VIC	–	132	Fitzroy City (5)	3–0	South Yarra (7)
VIC	–	133	Monash University (7)	2–0	Riversdale (8)
VIC	–	134	Moonee Valley Knights (9)	2–4	Epping City (6)
VIC	–	135	Brandon Park (6)	1–2	FC Strathmore (5)
VIC	–	136	Corio (5)	4–2	Warragul United (5)
VIC	–	137	Monbulk Rangers (6)	0–4	Elwood City (7)
VIC	–	138	Skye United (6)	0–6	Banyule City (5)
VIC	–	139	Sandringham (8)	1–3	Brimbank Stallions (5)
VIC	–	140	Ashburton United (7)	4–1	Monash City Villareal (8)
VIC	–	141	Richmond (5)	0–1	West Point (9)
VIC	–	142	Casey Comets (5)	w/o	Fawkner (7)
VIC	–	143	FC Clifton Hill (5)	5–2	Rowville Eagles (7)
VIC	–	144	Lalor United (6)	1–2	Williamstown (7)
VIC	–	145	Craigieburn City (7)	0–0†	Melton Phoenix (9)
Melton Phoenix advance 7–6 on penalties
VIC	–	146	Upfield (6)	5–1	Point Cook (7)
VIC	–	147	South Springvale (5)	11–0	Hampton Park United Sparrows (9)
VIC	–	148	Whittlesea United (5)	1–1†	Doncaster Rovers (6)
Whittlesea United advance 3–0 on penalties
VIC	–	149	Heatherton United (6)	0–0†	Sunbury United (7)
Heatherton United advance 7–6 on penalties
VIC	–	150	Moonee Ponds United (7)	2–4†	Bentleigh United Cobras (5)
VIC	–	151	Mazenod (5)	7–3	Mildura City (10)
VIC	–	152	Caroline Springs George Cross (5)	1–2	Essendon Royals (5)
VIC	–	153	Peninsula Strikers (6)	1–3	Eltham Redbacks (5)
VIC	–	154	Watsonia Heights (8)	3–2	Bayside Argonauts (7)
VIC	–	155	Whitehorse United (7)	2–1	Hume United (6)
VIC	–	156	Sebastopol Vikings (7)	6–2	Barwon (9)
VIC	–	157	Glenroy Lions (9)	2–4	White Star Dandenong (9)
VIC	–	158	Meadow Park (9)	1–4	Keilor Park (5)
VIC	–	159	Mornington (5)	6–0	Uni Hill Eagles (8)
VIC	–	160	Collingwood City (6)	4–1	Hoppers Crossing (6)
VIC	–	161	Sydenham Park (5)	6–1	Western Eagles (7)
VIC	–	162	Altona City (5)	w/o	Surf Coast (8)
VIC	–	163	Malvern City (5)	0–2	Old Scotch (6)
VIC	–	164	Westgate (6)	0–1	Keilor Wolves (8)
VIC	–	165	Frankston Pines (7)	6–0	Lara United (9)
VIC	–	166	Westvale (7)	3–1	Knox City (6)
VIC	–	167	Yarraville (5)	1–0	Heidelberg Eagles (7)
VIC	–	168	Berwick City (6)	2–3†	Altona East Phoenix (6)
VIC	–	169	Boroondara-Carey Eagles (5)	1–0	Diamond Valley United (7)
Western Australia
WA	–	170	Emerald FC (5)	3–0	Jaguar FC (5)
WA	–	171	Carramar Shamrock Rovers (4)	0–2	Wanneroo City (4)
WA	–	172	Canning City (4)	1–4	Quinns FC (3)
WA	–	173	Morley-Windmills (4)	2–2†	Joondalup United (3)
Joondalup United advance 6–5 on penalties
WA	–	174	Joondanna Blues (10)	1–1†	Ashfield SC (4)
Ashfield FC advance 4–2 on penalties
WA	–	175	Ballajura AFC (8)	4–4†	Maddington White City (5)
Ballajura AFC advance 5–3 on penalties
WA	–	176	Murdoch University Melville (3)	3–0	Kwinana United (5)
WA	–	177	Balga SC (4)	8–3	Riverside CFC (-)
WA	–	178	UWA-Nedlands (3)	4–0	Northern City (9)
WA	–	179	Swan United (4)	7–0	Albany Caledonian (-)
WA	–	180	North Beach (6)	1–2	South Perth United (6)
WA	–	181	Hamersley Rovers (5)	0–3	Kingsley Westside (4)
WA	–	182	Rockingham City (3)	5–1	Subiaco AFC (3)
WA	–	183	Busselton City (-)	2–3	Joondalup City (4)
WA	–	184	Chipolopolo FC (-)	2–4	Perth AFC (8)
WA	–	185	Curtin University (4)	3–1	Greyhounds CSC (10)
WA	–	186	Olympic Kingsway (3)	0–1	Gosnells City (4)
WA	–	187	Forrestfield United (3)	2–2†	Dianella White Eagles (3)
Forrestfield United advance 4–2 on penalties
WA	–	188	Mandurah City (3)	13–0	Yanchep United (9)
WA	–	189	South West Phoenix (4)	4–2	Football Margaret River (10)
WA	–	190	Western Knights (3)	1–0	Fremantle City (3)

Notes

- w/o = Walkover
- † = After Extra Time
- ACT Byes – ANU (3), Canberra White Eagles (3), Tuggeranong United (3), Wagga City Wanderers (3).
- QLD Bye – Brothers Townsville (-).
- SA Byes – Port Adelaide Pirates (3), Tea Tree Gully City (-).
- TAS Byes – Burnie United (3), Beachside FC (3).
- VIC Bye – Beaumaris SC (5).

== Fourth round ==
Fed.	Zone	Tie no	Home team (Tier)	Score	Away team (Tier)
Australian Capital Territory
ACT	–	1	Belnorth FC (4)	1–4	O'Connor Knights (2)
ACT	–	2	Queanbeyan City (3)	3–1	Canberra White Eagles (3)
ACT	–	3	West Canberra Wanderers (2)	3–2	Canberra Croatia (2)
ACT	–	4	Tigers FC (2)	0–4	Canberra Olympic (2)
ACT	–	5	Tuggeranong United (3)	8–0	Woden Valley (4)
ACT	–	6	Monaro Panthers (2)	3–1	Wagga City Wanderers (3)
ACT	–	7	Weston Molonglo (3)	0–9	ANU (3)
ACT	–	8	Gungahlin United (2)	1–3	Belconnen United (2)
New South Wales
NSW	–	9	Marconi Stallions (2)	7–0	Lane Cove (-)
NSW	–	10	Sutherland Sharks (2)	4–0	Albion Park White Eagles (6)
NSW	–	11	Wollongong Olympic (6)	6–4	Glebe Gorillas (-)
NSW	–	12	Blacktown City (2)	1–0	APIA Leichhardt (2)
NSW	–	13	Hurstville ZFC (5)	3–1	UNSW (5)
NSW	–	14	Sydney CBD (6)	1–5	Blacktown Spartans (3)
NSW	–	15	Dunbar Rovers (4)	2–0	Fraser Park (5)
NSW	–	16	Southern Districts Raiders (3)	1–2	Northern Tigers (3)
NSW	–	17	Banksia Tigers (-)	2–4	Dulwich Hill (4)
NSW	–	18	Canterbury Bankstown (4)	6–0	Greenacre Eagles (-)
NSW	–	19	St George City (3)	1–1†	Sydney Olympic (2)
St George City advance 4–2 on penalties
NSW	–	20	Sydney Uni (4)	7–0	Forest Rangers (-)
NSW	–	21	Tarrawanna Blueys (6)	0–8	Rockdale Ilinden (2)
NSW	–	22	Parramatta FC (5)	1–0†	Phoenix FC (-)
NSW	–	23	Inter Lions (4)	1–4†	Macquarie Dragons (6)
NSW	–	24	Norwest FC (-)	4–3	Randwick City (-)
NSW	–	25	Hills United (3)	5–1	Nepean FC (5)
NSW	–	26	Rydalmere Lions (4)	2–4	Manly United (2)
NSW	–	27	Enfield Rovers (-)	5–3	Wyoming FC (6)
NSW	–	28	Wollongong Wolves (2)	6–2	Western Rage (5)
NSW	–	29	Willoughby Dalleys (-)	1–0	Prospect United (5)
NSW	–	30	Waverley Old Boys (6)	4–0	Connells Point Rovers (-)
NSW	–	31	Arncliffe Aurora (-)	w/o	Knox United (-)
NSW	–	32	Unanderra Hearts (7)	2–4	Lindfield FC (-)
NSW	–	33	Quakers Hill Junior (-)	0–7	Sydney United 58 (2)
NSW	–	34	NWS Spirit (3)	5–0	Coogee United (6)
NSW	–	35	Castle Hill RSL Rockets (-)	4–2	Fairfield Patrician Brothers (-)
NSW	–	36	Bankstown City (4)	3–1	Inner West Hawks (4)
NSW	–	37	St George FC (3)	0–2	Bonnyrigg White Eagles (3)
NSW	–	38	Wollongong United (6)	3–0	Central Coast United (4)
NSW	–	39	Mounties Wanderers (3)	0–0†	Mt Druitt Town Rangers (2)
Mounties Wanderers advance 4–1 on penalties
NSW	–	40	Hakoah Sydney City East (3)	4–0	Narrabeen FC (-)
Northern New South Wales
NNSW	NTH	41	Boambee Bombers (-)	0–7	Oxley Vale Attunga (-)
NNSW	NTH	42	Coffs City United (4)	9–0	Iona FC (-)
NNSW	NTH	43	Coffs Coast Tigers (4)	3–1	Bellingen FC (-)
NNSW	NTH	44	Moore Creek (-)	0–1	Port Saints (-)
NNSW	STH	45	Maitland FC (2)	7–1	Newcastle University Men's (5)
NNSW	STH	46	South Cardiff (3)	0–6	Lambton Jaffas (2)
NNSW	STH	47	Kahibah FC (3)	2–5	Lake Macquarie City (2)
NNSW	STH	48	Cessnock City Hornets (3)	0–8	New Lambton FC (3)
NNSW	STH	49	Newcastle Olympic (2)	13–0	Cardiff City (4)
NNSW	STH	50	Valentine Phoenix (2)	5–1	Hamilton Azzurri (4)
NNSW	STH	51	Mayfield United Seniors (4)	1–3†	Adamstown Rosebud (2)
NNSW	STH	52	Swansea FC (4)	0–8	Weston Bears (2)
NNSW	STH	53	Charlestown Azzurri (2)	3–0	Warners Bay (4)
NNSW	STH	54	Cooks Hill United (2)	5–1	Belmont Swansea United (3)
NNSW	STH	55	Edgeworth FC (2)	6–0	Dudley Redhead United Senior (4)
NNSW	STH	56	Mayfield United Junior (6)	0–17	Broadmeadow Magic (2)
Northern Territory
NT	ASP	57	Alice Springs Celtic (2)	2–3	MPH Vikings (2)
NT	ASP	58	Verdi FC (2)	7–1	Stormbirds SC (2)
NT	DAR	59	Darwin Olympic (2)	1–2	Garuda FC (3)
NT	DAR	60	Port Darwin (2)	6–1	Litchfield FC (3)
NT	DAR	61	University Azzurri (2)	4–4†	Casuarina FC (2)
Casuarina FC advance 3–2 on penalties
Queensland
QLD	FNQ	62	Innisfail United (5)	1–7	Mareeba United (5)
QLD	FNQ	63	Stratford Dolphins (5)	0–3	Edge Hill United (5)
QLD	NQ	64	Brothers Townsville (-)	2–3	MA Olympic (5)
QLD	NQ	65	Burdekin FC (5)	2–2†	Townsville Warriors (5)
Burdekin FC advance 1–0 on penalties
QLD	WC	66	Magpies FC (-)	5–2	Mackay Wanderers (-)
QLD	WC	67	Mackay Lions (-)	1–6	Magpies Crusaders United (3)
QLD	WB	68	Across The Waves (5)	6–0	Fraser Flames (5)
QLD	CC	69	Frenchville FC (5)	4–1	Central FC Gladstone (5)
QLD	SEQ	70	Ipswich Knights (3)	1–5	Broadbeach United (5)
QLD	SEQ	71	Surfers Paradise Apollo (4)	0–9	Peninsula Power (2)
QLD	SEQ	72	North Pine (6)	2–0	UQFC (5)
QLD	SEQ	73	Mitchelton FC (3)	4–1	Robina City (5)
QLD	SEQ	74	Pine Hills FC (5)	6–2	Musgrave (6)
QLD	SEQ	75	Redcliffe Dolphins (6)	3–2	Capalaba FC (2)
QLD	SEQ	76	Moggill FC (7)	0–3	Sunshine Coast Wanderers (2)
QLD	SEQ	77	Rochedale Rovers (3)	2–1	North Star (4)
QLD	SEQ	78	Olympic (2)	6–0	Albany Creek Excelsior (4)
QLD	SEQ	79	Gold Coast United (2)	3–2	North Brisbane FÇ (6)
QLD	SEQ	80	Maroochydore FC (5)	2–1	St. George Willawong (5)
QLD	SEQ	81	Sunshine Coast (3)	3–0	Nambour-Yandina United (5)
QLD	SEQ	82	Moreton Bay United (2)	3–0	Kingscliff District (5)

Fed.	Zone	Tie no	Home team (Tier)	Score	Away team (Tier)
QLD	SEQ	83	Runaway Bay SC (5)	0–4	Gold Coast Knights (2)
QLD	SEQ	84	The Lakes FC (5)	2–3	Redlands United (3)
QLD	SEQ	85	Holland Parks Hawks (4)	1–4	SWQ Thunder (3)
QLD	SEQ	86	Ridge Hills United (8)	0–4	Southside Eagles (3)
QLD	SEQ	87	Logan Lightning (2)	5–0	Annerley FC (6)
QLD	SEQ	88	Yeronga Eagles (8)	1–7	Brisbane City (2)
QLD	SEQ	89	Caboolture Sports (3)	4–0	Taringa Rovers (4)
QLD	SEQ	90	Brisbane Strikers (3)	1–6	Lions FC (2)
QLD	SEQ	91	Southport Warriors (5)	1–4	Western Pride (3)
QLD	SEQ	92	Grange Thistle (4)	0–2	Eastern Suburbs (2)
QLD	SEQ	93	Virginia United (4)	0–1	Bayside United (5)
South Australia
SA	–	94	Adelaide Comets (2)	1–3	Adelaide Olympic (2)
SA	–	95	Ghan Kilburn City (-)	0–0†	Noarlunga United (4)
Noarlunga United advance 4–2 on penalties
SA	–	96	Eastern United (3)	5–3	Elizabeth Downs (5)
SA	–	97	Adelaide City (2)	6–0	Modbury Vista (4)
SA	–	98	Adelaide Uni SC (3)	1–3	Playford City Patriots (3)
SA	–	99	Campbelltown City (2)	3–0	The Cove (4)
SA	–	100	Gawler Eagles (4)	0–2†	Salisbury United (4)
SA	–	101	Vipers FC (4)	2–1	Cumberland United (2)
SA	–	102	West Adelaide (3)	3–0	Adelaide Victory (3)
SA	–	103	Sturt Lions (2)	2–3	North Eastern MetroStars (2)
SA	–	104	Tea Tree Gully City (-)	2–5	Modbury SC (3)
SA	–	105	Port Adelaide Pirates (3)	4–2	Mount Barker United (4)
SA	–	106	West Torrens Birkalla (2)	1–0	FK Beograd (2)
SA	–	107	Parafield Gardens (-)	6–1	Adelaide Hills Hawks (3)
SA	–	108	Croydon Kings (2)	3–1	Adelaide Blue Eagles (3)
SA	–	109	South Adelaide (2)	2–0	Pontian Eagles (4)
Tasmania
TAS	–	110	New Town Eagles (3)	3–5	Olympia Warriors (2)
TAS	–	111	Taroona FC (3)	0–3	South Hobart (2)
TAS	–	112	Glenorchy Knights (2)	3–0	Burnie United (3)
TAS	–	113	Hobart United (3)	2–0	Launceston City (2)
TAS	–	114	Northern Rangers (3)	6–0	Somerset Sharks (3)
TAS	–	115	Riverside Olympic (2)	1–0	Beachside FC (3)
TAS	–	116	Kingborough Lions United (2)	8–1	Launceston United (3)
TAS	–	117	Clarence Zebras (2)	0–6	Devonport City (2)
Victoria
VIC	–	118	Pascoe Vale (3)	0–1	Kingston City (3)
VIC	–	119	Boroondara-Carey Eagles (5)	2–3	Melbourne Knights (2)
VIC	–	120	Upfield (6)	3–0	Sydenham Park (5)
VIC	–	121	Whittlesea Ranges (4)	2–1	Sebastopol Vikings (7)
VIC	–	122	Northcote City (3)	1–2†	Yarraville (5)
VIC	–	123	Ballarat City (4)	3–0	South Springvale (5)
VIC	–	124	Goulburn Valley Suns (3)	w/o	Casey Comets (5)
VIC	–	125	North Sunshine Eagles (4)	5–0	Manningham Juventus (8)
VIC	–	126	Frankston Pines (7)	3–4†	FC Clifton Hill (5)
VIC	–	127	Williamstown (7)	1–1†	Whittlesea United (5)
Whittlesea United advance 4–3 on penalties
VIC	–	128	Banyule City (5)	2–1	Heatherton United (6)
VIC	–	129	Doveton (4)	w/o	FC Strathmore (5)
VIC	–	130	Essendon Royals (5)	2–0	Moreland Zebras (3)
VIC	–	131	Moreland City (3)	4–1	North Geelong Warriors (3)
VIC	–	132	Avondale (2)	4–1	South Melbourne (2)
VIC	–	133	Beaumaris (5)	4–3	Preston Lions (4)
VIC	–	134	Old Scotch (6)	0–4	Collingwood City (6)
VIC	–	135	Eltham Redbacks (5)	3–1	Corio (5)
VIC	–	136	Bentleigh Greens (2)	4–1	Werribee City (3)
VIC	–	137	West Point (9)	1–4	Whitehorse United (7)
VIC	–	138	Manningham United Blues (3)	5–0	Keilor Park (5)
VIC	–	139	Green Gully (2)	6–0	Nunawading City (4)
VIC	–	140	Eastern Lions (2)	2–3	Brimbank Stallions (5)
VIC	–	141	Langwarrin (3)	1–3†	Hume City (2)
VIC	–	142	Dandenong Thunder (2)	6–1	Brunswick City (3)
VIC	–	143	Altona East Phoenix (6)	1–0	Mornington (5)
VIC	–	144	Mazenod (5)	0–3	Port Melbourne Sharks (2)
VIC	–	145	Oakleigh Cannons (2)	4–0	Epping City (6)
VIC	–	146	Box Hill United (4)	2–0	Ashburton United (7)
VIC	–	147	Springvale White Eagles (4)	4–0	Altona City (5)
VIC	–	148	Geelong (4)	0–4	Heidelberg United (2)
VIC	–	149	White Star Dandenong (9)	5–1	Monash University (7)
VIC	–	150	Keilor Wolves (8)	3–2	Westvale (7)
VIC	–	151	St Albans Saints (2)	7–1	Melton Phoenix (9)
VIC	–	152	Altona Magic (2)	9–1	Bentleigh United Cobras (5)
Western Australia
WA	–	153	Joondalup City (4)	0–2	Inglewood United (2)
WA	–	154	Curtin University (4)	3–4	Kingsley Westside (4)
WA	–	155	Quinns FC (3)	1–2	Western Knights (3)
WA	–	156	Ashfield SC (4)	1–0	South Perth United (6)
WA	–	157	Balga SC (4)	2–0	Ballajura AFC (8)
WA	–	158	Forrestfield United (3)	3–4	Joondalup United (3)
WA	–	159	Perth RedStar (2)	1–3	Sorrento FC (2)
WA	–	160	Emerald FC (5)	2–1	Balcatta Etna (2)
WA	–	161	Murdoch University Melville (3)	3–0	South West Phoenix (4)
WA	–	162	Gosnells City (4)	3–7	Armadale SC (2)
WA	–	163	Swan United (4)	0–2	Gwelup Croatia (2)
WA	–	164	Perth SC (2)	7–0	Rockingham City (3)
WA	–	165	Perth AFC (8)	0–5	Cockburn City (2)
WA	–	166	Stirling Macedonia (2)	3–2†	Floreat Athena (2)
WA	–	167	Wanneroo City (4)	0–6	Bayswater City (2)
WA	–	168	Mandurah City (3)	4–0	UWA-Nedlands (3)

Notes

- w/o = Walkover
- † = After Extra Time
- NT Bye: Darwin Hearts (3).
- VIC Byes: FC Bulleen Lions (3), Dandenong City (2), Elwood City (7), Fitzroy City (5), Watsonia Heights (8).

== Fifth round ==
Fed.	Zone	Tie no	Home team (Tier)	Score	Away team (Tier)
Australian Capital Territory
ACT	–	1	Belconnen United (2)	1–4	Canberra Olympic (2)
ACT	–	2	ANU (3)	0–5	Monaro Panthers (2)
ACT	–	3	Tuggeranong United (3)	1–4†	West Canberra Wanderers (2)
ACT	–	4	O'Connor Knights (2)	4–1	Queanbeyan City (3)
New South Wales
NSW	–	5	Bonnyrigg White Eagles (3)	3–1†	Bankstown City (4)
NSW	–	6	Blacktown City (2)	2–1	Sutherland Sharks (2)
NSW	–	7	St George City (3)	4–2	Dulwich Hill (4)
NSW	–	8	Hurstville ZFC (5)	4–0	Macquarie Dragons (6)
NSW	–	9	Willoughby Dalleys (-)	5–2	Wollongong Olympic (6)
NSW	–	10	Mounties Wanderers (3)	3–0	Enfield Rovers (-)
NSW	–	11	Blacktown Spartans (3)	5–0	Castle Hill RSL Rockets (-)
NSW	–	12	Sydney United 58 (2)	1–0	Rockdale Ilinden (2)
NSW	–	13	Waverley Old Boys (6)	1–3†	Wollongong Wolves (2)
NSW	–	14	NWS Spirit (3)	4–2	Hills United (3)
NSW	–	15	Sydney Uni (4)	3–1	Norwest FC (-)
NSW	–	16	Hakoah Sydney City East (3)	2–2†	Marconi Stallions (2)
Hakoah Sydney City East advance 4–3 on penalties
NSW	–	17	Dunbar Rovers (4)	1–2	Wollongong United (6)
NSW	–	18	Arncliffe Aurora (-)	1–2	Parramatta FC (5)
NSW	–	19	Northern Tigers (3)	6–1	Manly United (2)
NSW	–	20	Canterbury Bankstown (4)	1–4	Lindfield FC (-)
Northern New South Wales
NNSW	NTH	21	Coffs City United (4)	4–1	Port Macquarie Saints (-)
NNSW	NTH	22	Oxley Vale Attunga (-)	2–9	Coffs Coast Tigers (4)
NNSW	STH	23	Charlestown Azzurri (2)	0–3	Newcastle Olympic (2)
NNSW	STH	24	Maitland FC (2)	6–0	Lambton Jaffas (2)
NNSW	STH	25	Cooks Hill United (2)	2–1	New Lambton FC (3)
NNSW	STH	26	Edgeworth FC (2)	2–3†	Weston Workers (2)
NNSW	STH	27	Adamstown Rosebud (2)	1–2	Lake Macquarie City (2)
NNSW	STH	28	Valentine Phoenix (2)	1–3	Broadmeadow Magic (2)
Northern Territory
NT	ASP	29	Verdi FC (2)	4–4†	MPH Vikings (2)
Verdi FC advance 5–4 on penalties
NT	DAR	30	Mindil Aces (2)	1–0	Darwin Hearts (3)
NT	DAR	31	Hellenic AC (2)	3–1	Port Darwin (2)
NT	DAR	32	Casuarina FC (2)	3–0	Garuda FC (3)
Queensland
QLD	FNQ	33	Mareeba United (5)	1–3	Edge Hill United (5)
QLD	NQ	34	Burdekin FC (5)	0–8	MA Olympic (5)
QLD	WC	35	Across The Waves (5)	3–2†	Frenchville FC (5)
QLD	NQ	36	Magpies FC (-)	0–8	Magpies Crusaders United (3)
QLD	SEQ	37	SWQ Thunder (3)	0–7	Lions FC (2)
QLD	SEQ	38	North Pine (6)	0–6	Brisbane City (2)
QLD	SEQ	39	Caboolture Sports (3)	0–4	Moreton Bay United (2)
QLD	SEQ	40	Bayside United (5)	0–4	Rochedale Rovers (3)
QLD	SEQ	41	Gold Coast United (2)	w/o	Maroochydore FC (5)
QLD	SEQ	42	Southside Eagles (3)	3–1	Eastern Suburbs (2)
QLD	SEQ	43	Mitchelton FC (3)	1–2	Sunshine Coast Wanderers (2)

Fed.	Zone	Tie no	Home team (Tier)	Score	Away team (Tier)
QLD	SEQ	44	Olympic FC (2)	9–2	Redcliffe Dolphins (6)
QLD	SEQ	45	Broadbeach United (5)	3–3†	Western Pride (3)
Broadbeach United advance 4–2 on penalties
QLD	SEQ	46	Redlands United (2)	1–1†	Sunshine Coast (3)
Sunshine Coast advance 4–2 on penalties
QLD	SEQ	47	Pine Hills (5)	1–2	Logan Lightning (2)
QLD	SEQ	48	Peninsula Power (2)	2–0	Gold Coast Knights (2)
South Australia
SA	–	49	Modbury Jets (3)	4–3	South Adelaide (2)
SA	–	50	Eastern United (3)	3–1	Noarlunga United (4)
SA	–	51	West Adelaide (3)	1–0	Croydon Kings (2)
SA	–	52	Playford City Patriots (3)	1–0	North Eastern MetroStars (2)
SA	–	53	Port Adelaide Pirates (3)	0–1	Vipers FC (4)
SA	–	54	Campbelltown City (2)	4–3	Adelaide Olympic (2)
SA	–	55	Salisbury United (4)	3–2	Parafield Gardens (-)
SA	–	56	Adelaide City (2)	5–0	West Torrens Birkalla (2)
Tasmania
TAS	–	57	South Hobart (2)	11–0	Riverside Olympic (2)
TAS	–	58	Northern Rangers (3)	0–3	Olympia Warriors (2)
TAS	–	59	Glenorchy Knights (2)	2–4	Devonport City (2)
TAS	–	60	Kingborough Lions United (2)	2–0	Hobart United (3)
Victoria
VIC	–	61	FC Clifton Hill (5)	1–3	Dandenong Thunder (2)
VIC	–	62	Essendon Royals (5)	4–2	Eltham Redbacks (5)
VIC	–	63	Port Melbourne Sharks (2)	4–0	Manningham United Blues (3)
VIC	–	64	St Albans Saints (2)	4–2	Whittlesea Ranges (4)
VIC	–	65	Melbourne Knights (2)	2–0	FC Bulleen Lions (3)
VIC	–	66	Oakleigh Cannons (2)	12–0	White Star Dandenong (9)
VIC	–	67	Beaumaris (5)	1–2†	Upfield (6)
VIC	–	68	Kingston City (3)	2–4†	Avondale (2)
VIC	–	69	Moreland City (3)	5–1	Watsonia Heights (8)
VIC	–	70	Box Hill United (4)	2–3	Banyule City (5)
VIC	–	71	Elwood City (7)	1–5	Collingwood City (6)
VIC	–	72	Heidelberg United (2)	5–0	Altona East Phoenix (6)
VIC	–	73	Brimbank Stallions (5)	2–1	Yarraville (5)
VIC	–	74	Goulburn Valley Suns (3)	5–0	North Sunshine Eagles (4)
VIC	–	75	Keilor Wolves (8)	1–3†	Whittlesea United (5)
VIC	–	76	Bentleigh Greens (2)	2–1	Altona Magic (2)
VIC	–	77	Fitzroy City (5)	0–3	Green Gully (2)
VIC	–	78	Ballarat City (4)	4–1	Springvale White Eagles (4)
VIC	–	79	Doveton (4)	5–2	Whitehorse United (7)
VIC	–	80	Hume City (2)	1–0	Dandenong City (2)
Western Australia
WA	–	81	Joondalup United (3)	2–4	Cockburn City (2)
WA	–	82	Mandurah City (3)	1–1†	Inglewood United (2)
Inglewood United advance 4–3 on penalties
WA	–	83	Murdoch University Melville (3)	1–0	Ashfield SC (4)
WA	–	84	Perth SC (2)	1–2	Armadale SC (2)
WA	–	85	Western Knights (3)	3–0	Gwelup Croatia (2)
WA	–	86	Balga SC (4)	0–3	Stirling Macedonia (2)
WA	–	87	Bayswater City (2)	10–1	Kingsley Westside (4)
WA	–	88	Emerald FC (5)	2–4	Sorrento FC (2)

Notes

- † = After Extra Time

== Sixth round ==
Fed.	Zone	Tie no	Home team (Tier)	Score	Away team (Tier)
Australian Capital Territory
ACT	–	1	Monaro Panthers (2)	3–3†	Canberra Olympic (2)
Monaro Panthers advance 4–3 on penalties
ACT	–	2	West Canberra Wanderers (2)	3–3†	O'Connor Knights (2)
West Canberra Wanderers advance 4–2 on penalties
New South Wales
NSW	–	3	Blacktown City (2)	0–1	Wollongong United (6)
NSW	–	4	Wollongong Wolves (2)	5–0	Lindfield FC (-)
NSW	–	5	Bonnyrigg White Eagles (3)	0–0†	Mounties Wanderers (3)
Bonnyrigg White Eagles advance 4–3 on penalties
NSW	–	6	St George City (3)	2–0	Blacktown Spartans (3)
NSW	–	7	Hakoah Sydney City East (3)	4–1	Sydney University (4)
NSW	–	8	Northern Tigers (3)	8–1	Willoughby Dalleys (-)
NSW	–	9	Sydney United 58 (2)	2–0	Hurstville ZFC (5)
NSW	–	10	Parramatta FC (5)	0–1	NWS Spirit (3)
Northern New South Wales
NNSW	–	11	Cooks Hill United (2)	4–0	Coffs Coast Tigers (4)
NNSW	–	12	Coffs City United (4)	1–3	Broadmeadow Magic (2)
NNSW	–	13	Newcastle Olympic (2)	2–0	Lake Macquarie City (2)
NNSW	–	14	Maitland FC (2)	5–1	Weston Workers (2)
Northern Territory
NT	–	15	Casuarina FC (2)	3–0	Verdi FC (2)
NT	DAR	16	Mindil Aces (2)	2–1	Hellenic AC (2)
Queensland
QLD	NQ	17	MA Olympic (5)	3–4	Edge Hill United (5)
QLD	NQ	18	Magpies Crusaders United (3)	4–2	Across The Waves (5)
QLD	SEQ	19	Rochedale Rovers (3)	5–3	Broadbeach United (5)
QLD	SEQ	20	Lions FC (2)	2–0	Moreton Bay United (2)
QLD	SEQ	21	Gold Coast United (2)	1–2†	Peninsula Power (2)

Fed.	Zone	Tie no	Home team (Tier)	Score	Away team (Tier)
QLD	SEQ	22	Southside Eagles (3)	1–2	Sunshine Coast (3)
QLD	SEQ	23	Logan Lightning (2)	2–1	Olympic FC (2)
QLD	SEQ	24	Sunshine Coast Wanderers (2)	0–4	Brisbane City (2)
South Australia
SA	–	25	West Adelaide (3)	0–2	Modbury Jets (3)
SA	–	26	Campbelltown City (2)	1–2	Eastern United (3)
SA	–	27	Adelaide City (2)	4–1	Salisbury United (4)
SA	–	28	Playford City (3)	0–1	Vipers FC (4)
Tasmania
TAS	–	29	Olympia Warriors (2)	1–6	South Hobart (2)
TAS	–	30	Devonport City (2)	1–0	Kingborough Lions United (2)
Victoria
VIC	–	31	Oakleigh Cannons (2)	1–0	Hume City (2)
VIC	–	32	Essendon Royals (5)	2–4	Avondale (2)
VIC	–	33	Bentleigh Greens (2)	3–0	St Albans Saints (2)
VIC	–	34	Banyule City (5)	2–1	Goulburn Valley Suns (3)
VIC	–	35	Melbourne Knights (2)	1–0	Collingwood City (6)
VIC	–	36	Dandenong Thunder (2)	1–0	Port Melbourne Sharks (2)
VIC	–	37	Heidelberg United (2)	3–1	Ballarat City (4)
VIC	–	38	Doveton (4)	0–4	Green Gully (2)
VIC	–	39	Whittlesea United (5)	4–0	Upfield (6)
VIC	–	40	Brimbank Stallions (5)	3–0	Moreland City (3)
Western Australia
WA	–	41	Sorrento FC (2)	2–1	Murdoch University Melville (3)
WA	–	42	Cockburn City (2)	1–0	Stirling Macedonia (2)
WA	–	43	Inglewood United (2)	0–2	Armadale SC (2)
WA	–	44	Bayswater City (2)	6–0	Western Knights (3)

Notes

- † = After Extra Time

== Seventh round ==
Fed.	Zone	Tie no	Home team (Tier)	Score	Away team (Tier)
Australian Capital Territory
ACT	–	1	Monaro Panthers (2)	3–1†	West Canberra Wanderers (2)
New South Wales
NSW	–	2	St George City (3)	1–2	Wollongong United (6)
NSW	–	3	Bonnyrigg White Eagles (3)	1–1†	Hakoah Sydney City East (3)
Bonnyrigg White Eagles advance 11–10 on penalties
NSW	–	4	NWS Spirit (3)	1–1†	Wollongong Wolves (2)
North West Sydney Spirit advance 5–4 on penalties
NSW	–	5	Northern Tigers (3)	1–2	Sydney United 58 (2)
Northern New South Wales
NNSW	–	6	Cooks Hill United (2)	0–3	Newcastle Olympic (2)
NNSW	–	7	Maitland FC (2)	1–2	Broadmeadow Magic (2)
Northern Territory
NT	–	8	Mindil Aces (2)	2–0	Casuarina FC (2)
Queensland
QLD	NQ	9	Edge Hill United (5)	0–5	Magpies Crusaders United (3)
QLD	SEQ	10	Brisbane City (2)	4–2	Lions FC (2)
QLD	SEQ	11	Rochedale Rovers (3)	0–2	Peninsula Power (2)
QLD	SEQ	12	Logan Lightning (2)	5–0	Sunshine Coast (3)

Fed.	Zone	Tie no	Home team (Tier)	Score	Away team (Tier)
South Australia
SA	–	13	Eastern United (3)	0–5	Adelaide City (2)
SA	–	14	Vipers FC (4)	1–4	Modbury Jets (3)
Tasmania
TAS	–	15	South Hobart (2)	0–3	Devonport City (2)
Victoria
VIC	–	16	Bentleigh Greens (2)	3–0	Banyule City (5)
VIC	–	17	Melbourne Knights (2)	0–4	Oakleigh Cannons (2)
VIC	–	18	Green Gully (2)	4–0	Whittlesea United (5)
VIC	–	19	Brimbank Stallions (5)	0–8	Avondale (2)
VIC	–	20	Dandenong Thunder (2)	0–2	Heidelberg United (2)
Western Australia
WA	–	21	Sorrento FC (2)	1–3†	Cockburn City (2)
WA	–	22	Armadale SC (2)	4–1	Bayswater City (2)

Notes

- † = After Extra Time

== A-League Men play-offs ==
12 May 2022
19:30 AEST

Newcastle Jets	3–1	Perth Glory
Elsey 25'; Penha 30'; Goodwin 90+3'	Report	Vecchio 71'

McDonald Jones Stadium, Newcastle
Attendance: 1,028
Referee: Tim Danaskos

13 May 2022
19:30 AEST

Western Sydney Wanderers	1–3	Brisbane Roar
Carluccio 8'	Report	Dehmie 51'; Ivanovic 58', 75'

Wanderers Football Park, Sydney
Attendance: 824
Referee: Kurt Ams
