= Bulli FC =

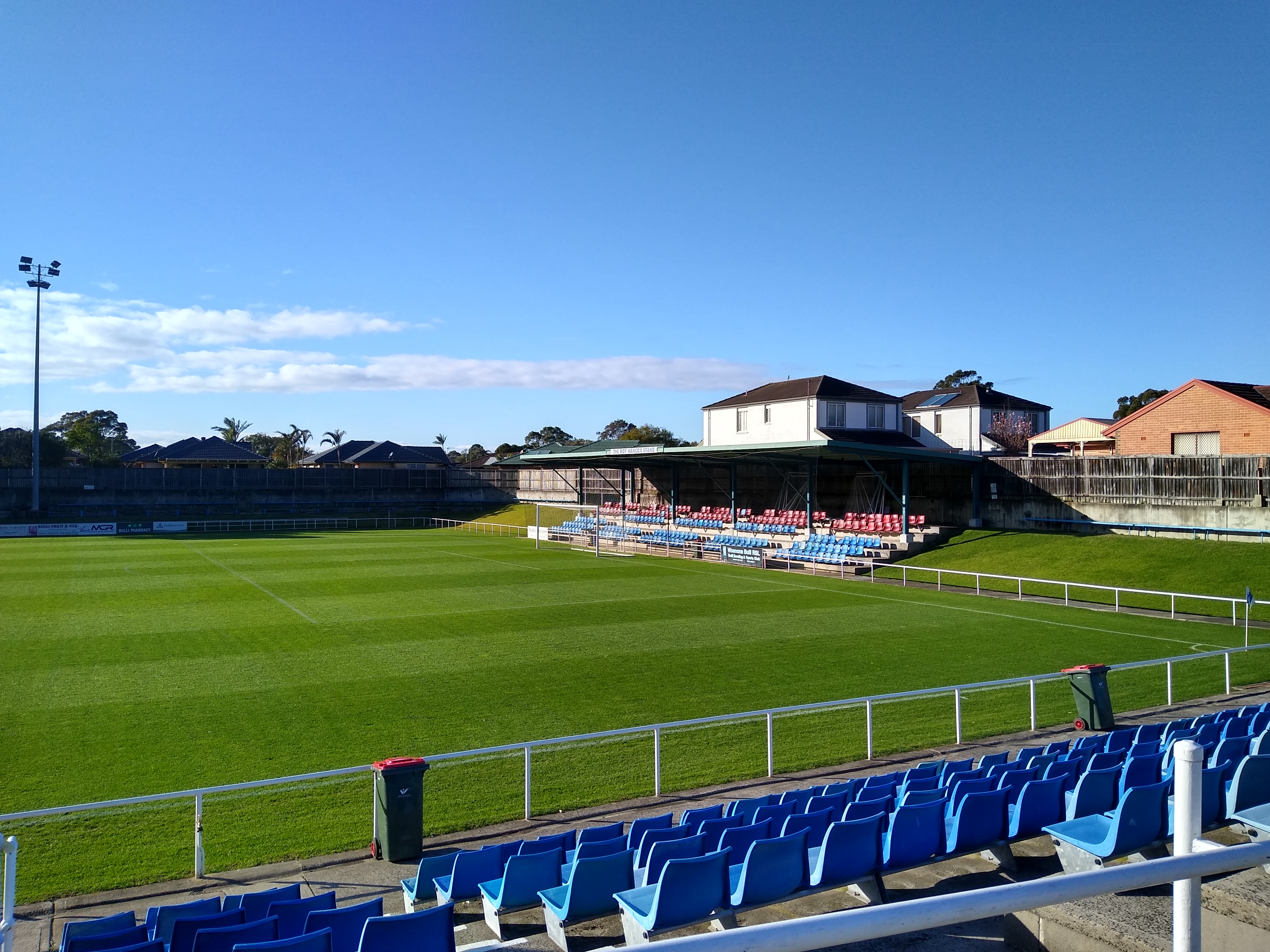
- Balls Paddock
- Full name: Bulli Football Club
- Nickname: The 'I
- Founded: 1901; 125 years ago
- Ground: Balls Paddock, Woonona
- Capacity: 1000
- President: Dane Hamilton
- Head Coach: Robert Bemi
- League: Illawarra Premier League
- 2025: 5th of 12
- Website: http://www.bullifc.com.au/
Home colours	Away colours

Bulli FC, commonly known as Bulli Football Club are a semi-professional association football team based in Bulli, New South Wales. They compete in the Illawarra Premier League, and are considered one of the most successful teams in the competition having finished Premiers 4 times, the most recently in 2014. The team plays out of Balls Paddock, a small ground located at Woonona, just south of Bulli which was opened in 1988. Bulli FC has had several well known, high-profile players both play, and coach at the club including Socceroos players Adrian Alston, and Dean Heffernan. In addition to their Illawarra Premier League team, Bulli FC also fields junior teams and women's teams in local club competitions in Wollongong.

== Current Squads ==
=== First Grade 2025 ===
Captain: Ben McDonald

Players:

1: Ayman Hill (GK)

4: Samuel Sisounon (C)

5: Logan Mathie

6: Sam Davies

7: Denim Nou

8: Aaron Baker

9: Ben McDonald (C)

10: Lewis Grimshaw

11: Noah Vidler

12: Marcelo Martellotta

13: Benjamin Spruce

14: Rui Ishizuka

16: Alexander Price

17: Michael Kyriakoudes

18: Adam Kairis

21: Ben McGinnes (GK)

23: Alexander Rooke

24: Ryan Akhurst

25: Samuel Adnum

Coach: Robert Bemi

Coach: Ryan Emerton

Coach: Jason Hegarty

Manager: Kal Kis

=== Youth Grade 2025 ===
Captain: Kiran Dhami

Players:

15: Gabriel Corvalan

26: Will Bain

28: Lucas Dubowski

30: Kiran Dhami (C)

32: Lachlan McLeish

33: Max Miranda

34: Luca Jones

37: Luca Mastroianni

38: Kai Macpherson

39: William Davis

40: Joel Olbourne

41: Travis Lee (GK)

42: Cooper Karlson

43: Kyan Hawke

44: Ben Parry

45: Kyan Wallis

Coach: Arturo Miranda

Coach: Allan Jones

Manager: Alan McLeish

=== Second Grade 2025 ===
Captain: Alexander Baulch

Players:

2: Jake Almond

3: Alexander Baulch (C)

19: Jett Stroemer

20: Lennox Roodenrys

22: Noah McNeill

27: Lewis Clements

29: Flynn Martin

31: Fletcher Bowler (GK)

35: Jackson Giustiniani

36: Cassidy Mar

46: Mason Elphick

47: Zane Stroemer

48: Hayden Southall

49: Jayden Cook

50: Cameron Bogeski

Coach: Kevin Lewis

Coach: Randolph Mar

Manager: Mark Hancox

== History ==
=== Foundation ===
Bulli football club, was founded at the turn of the 20th century in 1901, however records of some organised football competition go back as far as the mid 1880s. This is believed to be the North Illawarra Rovers who are credited with being the "First club on the NSW South Coast – North Illawarra, with a ground at Bulli, founded in 1888". The foundations of the club were believed to have occurred whilst British traditions of football were still in a development stage.

=== Early years ===
Historically, Bulli have always played in strips of blue and white. This however changed in the 1950s when following amalgamation with Bulli Surf Life Saving Club (Bulli SLSC) they changed their kits to green and gold. In 1956 Bulli took out their first Premiership of the Illawarra 1st division. The 1960s were seen as the golden generation for the club, with silverware and success being had right throughout the decade. The 1969 team, coached by Ron Mcgarry (Ex Newcastle Unt UK and South coast Unt) won an impressive 5 trophies that year, including the Premiership & Championship for 1969, NSW Amateur Cup, Langridge Shield and the Corrimal Leagues Knock-out. These successes earned the team the title "The invincibles".

=== 1970s, 1980s and 1990s ===
Th 1970s saw a return to a blue and white playing strip. However the 70s was not to be a successful decade for the club on the field. However, it was a success for the field of youth which the club brought through their ranks. The club however struggled in the opening years of the IPL.

The 1980s would be a mixed bag of success's and disappointments for the club. They were relegated into the second division in 1982, however re-gained promotion into the Illawarra Premier League after winning the 1983 second division. 2 years later they would achieve their first success in the Illawarra Premier League, when they won the 1985 season. 1986 would see them defend their Premiership, and go on to win further silverware, winner the grand final. 1988 would also see more success for the North Wollongong club, with the opening of their home ground Balls Paddock, by Wollongong Mayor Frank Arkell, MP Brian Tobin, and Illawarra Football Association President George Naylor. Bulli would go on to win their third IPL title in 1988, their last piece of silverware for 26 years.

The 1990s for the club saw steady finishing, for little or no reward. Some of the club's most famous, and well-respected players played during this era including Rod Paterson who would go on a 22-year career with the club.

=== 2000s-now ===
The start of the 21st century started poorly for Bulli, with the club being relegated for only their second time in its history in 2002 since the foundation of the Illawarra Premier League. However, like their previous relegation in 1982, the club bounced back the season following, and would go on to win the Bampton Cup in 2004.

In 2006 Bulli made headlines in the Australian footballing community, when they signed former English born Socceroo, Adrian Alston. Alston, who made appearances for Cardiff City FC, and Luton Town FC coached the club for 2-years.

The club's next major piece of silverware would come in the 2014 Illawarra Premier League season, where they finished Premiers, ahead of Dapto Dandaloo Fury FC. Dapto Dandaloo would go on to win the grand final, defeating Bulli 2–0 in the process. It was this season they signed another former Socceroo, and former A-League stalwart Dean Heffernan who signed for the club following a stint with the Western Sydney Wanderers.

In 2017, Matt Bailey took over from Ben Smith as first-grade coach. The side enjoyed success in the FFA Cup, reaching the seventh round where they were beaten 3–0 by NPL heavyweights Blacktown City at Balls Paddock. Bulli won the Bert Bampton Cup for the second time in their history, their final opponents where Albion Park White Eagles and a Marcus Beattie goal saw Bulli win 1–0. In the final round of the season, Bulli clinched their fifth League Championship with a 1–0 win over 2nd placed Wollongong Olympic FC. Bulli made it to the Grand Final where they faced Port Kembla who came 5th in the regular season. Though Bulli were strong favourites Port Kembla secured a shock upset, winning via a penalty shootout after it finished 0–0 after extra time.

== Grand Final Hoodoo ==
Despite being one of the Premier League's most successful clubs, Bulli would go 32-years between their first grand final win in 1986 and their second in 2018. This period saw the club lose eight grand finals including seven in 12 seasons between 2006 and 2017 including a shock penalty shootout defeat to Port Kembla in 2017 which was one of the biggest upsets in the competition's history. Bulli would break the hoodoo in 2018 with a 3–2 win over rivals Wollongong United at Win Stadium

== 2025 Grand Final Victories ==
Second Grade: Bulli defeated Cringila Lions 2-1 to win the Illawarra Premier League Second Grade Grand Final at WIN Stadium, securing a Second Grade double for 2025. Jake Almond and Flynn Martin scored in the first half to give Bulli a two-goal lead, before Dean Dimoski pulled one back for Cringila early in the second half. Despite a late surge from the Lions, Bulli held on, with goalkeeper Fletcher Bowler making key saves to secure the victory.

Youth Grade: Bulli’s youth grade side won the Premier League Grand Final victory against Wollongong United, winning 4-3 on penalties after a 1-1 draw and 20 minutes of extra time. Bulli finished the regular season in fifth place and qualified for the finals through their head-to-head record against sixth-placed Wollongong Olympic. The club was informed three days before the final that it would replace Cringila Lions, who were disqualified for fielding an ineligible player. During the regular season, Wollongong United had defeated Bulli 5–1 and 4–1. In the final, Oliver Robinson gave Wollongong United a first-half lead before Will Davis equalised in the 77th minute. No further goals were scored in extra time, and Bulli won the subsequent penalty shootout. Bulli goalkeeper Travis Lee made several saves during the shootout, while Kiran Dhami, Cassidy Mar, Lennox Roodenrys, and Davis converted their penalties.

== Notable past players and managers ==
- Adrian Alston – 43 appearances, 7 goals for Australia
- Dean Heffernan – 2 appearances, 1 goal for Australia

== Honours and awards ==
- (New South Wales) Illawarra Premier League
  - Premiers (6): 1985, 1986, 1988, 2014, 2017, 2018
  - Champions (2): 1986, 2018
- (New South Wales) Bert Bampton Cup
  - Champions (3): 2004, 2017, 2024
