= Blake Horton =

Australian soccer player (born 1994)

Personal information
- Date of birth: 11 August 1994 (age 32)
- Place of birth: Nowra, New South Wales, Australia
- Height: 1.84 m (6 ft 1/2 in)
- Position: Goalkeeper

Team information
- Current team: Coniston

Youth career
- Port Kembla

Senior career*
Years	Team	Apps	(Gls)
2012–2013	Port Kembla	2	(0)
2014–2015	Rockdale City Suns	3	(0)
2015–2017	Telstar	2	(0)
2017–2018	OFC Oostzaan		
2018	Mildenhall Town		
2019–	Coniston		
- * Club domestic league appearances and goals as of 21 May 2017

Blake Horton is an Australian footballer who plays as a goalkeeper for Coniston in the Illawarra Premier League.

Born in Nowra, New South Wales, Horton began his senior career for Rockdale City Suns before moving to the Netherlands to play for Telstar in 2015.

== Career ==
Horton made his debut for Telstar in the Dutch Eerste Divisie on 30 January 2016, coming on as a second half substitute after an injury to Wesley Zonneveld against FC Emmen. He made his first competitive start for the side on 15 April 2016 in a draw with FC Oss.

Horton returned to Australia to play in the Illawarra Premier League in 2019.
