= Josh Macdonald =

Australian soccer player

Personal information
- Full name: Joshua Robert Macdonald
- Date of birth: 25 January 1996 (age 30)
- Place of birth: Wollongong, Australia
- Height: 1.74 m (5 ft 9 in)
- Position: Forward

Team information
- Current team: Wollongong Olympic
- Number: 99

Youth career
- Unanderra Hearts
- Sutherland Sharks
- 2012: NSWIS
- 2012–2014: Sydney FC

Senior career*
Years	Team	Apps	(Gls)
2014	Albion Park White Eagles	14	(1)
2014–2015	Nottingham Forest	0	(0)
2015	Western Sydney Wanderers	2	(0)
2016	Western Sydney Wanderers NPL	8	(1)
2016–2018	Wollongong Wolves	45	(4)
2018–2019	Central Coast Mariners	2	(0)
2019–2020	Sydney United 58	32	(2)
2021	Wollongong Olympic	11	(4)
2022–2023	Wollongong Wolves	32	(4)
2023–2025	Albion Park White Eagles	54	(5)
2026–	Wollongong Olympic	4	(0)

International career^{‡}
2011–2012	Australia U-17	12	(6)
2013	Australia U-20	2	(0)
- * Club domestic league appearances and goals as of 17 April 2026 ‡ National team caps and goals as of 12 August 2015

Joshua Robert Macdonald (born 25 January 1996) is an Australian professional footballer, who plays for Wollongong Olympic.

Born in Wollongong, Macdonald played youth football with Sydney FC youth and Nottingham Forest before making his senior debut for Western Sydney Wanderers. He returned to Wollongong to play for Wollongong Wolves in 2016. Macdonald signed with Central Coast Mariners in 2018 and later returned to the state league system.

Macdonald represented Australia at youth level for the under-17 and under-20 sides. He participated in the 2012 AFC U-16 Championship.

== Playing career ==
=== Club ===
In February 2013, Macdonald had a trial with Nottingham Forest. He signed for the club's development side in September 2014. He played a brief stint for Albion Park White Eagles in the Illawarra Premier League in preparation for the move to England. He left Nottingham at the end of the 2014–15 Professional U21 Development League.

Following his release from Forest, Macdonald had a chance meeting with ex-Western Sydney Wanderers football operations manager Matt Phelan, eventually resulting in Macdonald trialling with the Wanderers. On 10 August 2016, Macdonald signed a youth contract to play for the Wanderers National Youth League team. The next day, Macdonald made his professional senior debut for Western Sydney in the 2015 FFA Cup against Brisbane Roar, including winning a penalty in a 1–0 win.

In May 2016, Macdonald signed for hometown side Wollongong Wolves to play in the National Premier Leagues.

He left the Wolves to join Albion Park White Eagles FC for the 2023 Illawarra Premier League season.

=== International ===
Macdonald was named in the Australian under-20 squad for 2014 AFC U-19 Championship qualification in October 2013. He made his debut for the side in a 3–0 win over Chinese Taipei. He came on at halftime in the team's next match, a 5–1 loss to Vietnam.

== Honours ==
=== Club ===
Sydney FC

- National Youth League: 2013–14

Sydney United

- (Australia) National Premier Leagues NSW Championship: 2020
