= Adrian Alston =

Australian association football player

Personal information
- Full name: Adrian Alston
- Date of birth: 6 February 1949 (age 77)
- Place of birth: Preston, England
- Height: 6 ft 0 in (1.83 m)
- Position: Striker

Youth career
- 1967–1968: Preston North End

Senior career*
| Years | Team | Apps | (Gls) |
| 1967–1968 | Fleetwood | 6 | (3) |
| 1968–1969 | South Coast United | | |
| 1970–1972 | St George | | |
| 1974 | Safeway United | 13 | (4) |
| 1974–1975 | Luton Town | 29 | (8) |
| 1975–1976 | Cardiff City | 48 | (16) |
| 1977–1978 | Tampa Bay Rowdies | 19 | (8) |
| 1977 | Canberra City | 10 | (3) |

International career^{‡}
| 1969–1977 | Australia | 37 | (6) |

Managerial career
- 1983: Wollongong City
- 1984–1989: Corrimal Rangers
- 1991–2004: Port Kembla
- 2004–2005: Wollongong Wolves
- 2006–2007: Bulli
- * Club domestic league appearances and goals as of 12 May 2007 ‡ National team caps and goals as of 12 May 2007

Adrian Alston (born 6 February 1949) is a former professional soccer player. Born in England, he began his career as a youth player with Preston North End and briefly at non-league Fleetwood before moving to Australia. In Australia, he played for South Coast United, then St George before returning to South Coast United (known as Safeway United before folding in 1974) and was called up to the Australia national soccer team after two years in the country.

Nicknamed "Noddy" for his heading ability, he made his international debut in 1969 and was instrumental in helping the side qualify for the 1974 FIFA World Cup, the first time the nation had ever reached the finals tournament, where he featured in all three group matches. His performances attracted attention from around Europe and he eventually signed for English First Division side Luton Town after turning down several offers from clubs in Germany. After one season, he joined Cardiff City where he spent two seasons and helped the club win the Welsh Cup in 1976. He later received a lucrative offer to play in the North American Soccer League (NASL) to join the newly formed Tampa Bay Rowdies, where he spent two seasons before retiring after suffering a serious knee ligament injury.

He returned to Australia to work as a manager, taking charge of the Wollongong Wolves in 1983 but left the club after a single season. He spent five years with Corrimal Rangers before being appointed manager of Port Kembla where he enjoyed considerable success, leading the club to 26 trophies between 1991 and 2004. He later returned to Wollongong for a second spell before managing Bulli between 2006 and 2007. His brother Alex was also a professional footballer.

== Career ==
=== Early career ===
Born in Preston, Alston was playing as an apprentice at his hometown club Preston North End where his older brother Alec Alston had made over 100 appearances before leaving in 1962. He was spotted playing a youth team match by Jimmy Kelly, who was the manager of Fleetwood and who took Alston to Fleetwood during the 1967–68. His brother Alec was already playing at Fleetwood that season. Kelly had previously spent four seasons playing in Australia and planned to return in 1968. Despite not yet turning professional, Kelly offered Alston a deal which quadrupled the wages he had been receiving at Preston to move to Australia and join South Coast United on an initial six-month loan deal. He had been playing with Preston for one year and was convinced to move after being told that the "heavy grounds" in England did not suit his playing style. Alston was due to be married at the time but convinced his fiancée Doreen to make the move with him.

He settled quickly in the country, scoring the goal that won the New South Wales Soccer Federation Division One title in 1969 in a 1–1 draw with APIA Leichhardt and was chosen to play for a New South Wales representative side soon after. He later moved to St George where he won a league title and was offered a contract in Japan, along with teammate Attila Abonyi, after impressing in an Asian tournament that St George won but turned down the deal. It was during this time that Abonyi who started using Alston's nickname "Noddy" in regards to his heading ability. He returned to his former club South Coast United, then known as Safeway United following a takeover by a motor company, in 1973 for a fee of $5,000.

=== Return to Europe ===
His performances in the 1974 World Cup saw Alston receive offers from a number of clubs in Germany, including Hertha Berlin, Hamburg and Eintracht Frankfurt. Alston agreed a deal with Hertha that included a $40,000 signing-on fee and a temporary apartment until he was able to secure his own living accommodation and a fee was agreed between Hertha and Safeway United. However, Alston received a late offer from Luton Town in the Football League who had tracked Alston following his performance against the side during a tour of England by the Australian national side in 1970, Alston having scored the winning goal during a 2–1 victory. The club had achieved promotion to the First Division, the highest tier in English football, the previous season and Alston decided to join the Hatters in order to help his wife settle and the lack of a language barrier. He also held talks with his former club Preston.

In his debut season, Alston finished as the club's joint top goalscorer, along with Ron Futcher, in the league as the club suffered relegation. However, Alston spent just one season at Kenilworth Road as the club began to experience financial difficulties resulting in Alston not being paid at times. Alston later described his decision to reject offers from Germany and return to England with Luton as "the biggest mistake I ever made". Cardiff City manager Jimmy Andrews paid £20,000 to take him to Ninian Park with the club also agreeing to pay Alston the wages owed to him by Luton. He scored twice on his debut in a 4–3 win over Chesterfield and later went on to become the first post-war Cardiff player to score a hat-trick in the FA Cup in a 6–2 win over Exeter City. In his first season, the club won the Welsh Cup, qualifying for the European Cup Winners' Cup the following season. In the first round of the competition, Alston became the first Australian player to score in a European competition when he scored in a 1–0 victory over Georgian side Dinamo Tbilisi on 15 September 1976.

After helping the club win promotion to Division Two, scoring the goal that confirmed promotion in a 1–0 victory over Bury, he struggled to reproduce his form the following year and left Cardiff to play in the NASL for Tampa Bay Rowdies. Alston later stated that he enjoyed playing for Cardiff more than any club in his career and had only chosen to accept Tampa's offer due to the money offered to him.

=== Later career ===
Alston joined the Rowdies after being spotted by the team's manager Eddie Firmani. On his debut for the Rowdies in the NASL, Alston was unveiled to the club's fans by arriving in a helicopter. He helped the club to a third-placed finish in his debut season, eventually being eliminated in the post season play-offs by the New York Cosmos. After his first season with Tampa, Alston returned to Australia to play for struggling Canberra City, who were managed by his former international teammate Johnny Warren as a guest player. Earning a fraction of his Rowdies wages, he scored on his debut, during a 4–0 victory over Sydney Olympic, and made a total of ten appearances and scored three times as he helped the side escape relegation before returning to Tampa. During his second season in the US, Alston suffered a knee injury that would eventually force him to retire from professional football after his studs were caught in the pitch while his knee was hit by an opposing player. He was initially told that he had suffered strained knee ligaments but after fourteen weeks with little progress he became concerned and hired a doctor in Harley Street in London. The doctor immediately informed Alston that the injury was considerably more serious as he had actually torn the ligament away from the bone. He remained out for the remainder of the season his contract was eventually paid off after his green card expired.

== International career ==
Alston was handed his debut for the Australian national team by head coach Joe Vlasits on 19 July 1969 in a 1–0 friendly victory over Greece, who were undertaking a tour of Australia, at the Sydney Cricket Ground. Alston later commented that as soon as he began playing for Australia, he was "no longer English". He won two further caps in 1969, playing in two out of three matches of a tour of Rhodesia against the national side in November, before scoring his first international goal the following year in a friendly match against Greece.

Alston was instrumental in Australia's progress during the qualifying rounds for the 1974 FIFA World Cup, scoring three goals in the group stage and once during the final play-off match against Iran as Australia qualified for the World Cup for the first time in their history.

He was named to the squad for the tournament in West Germany by manager Rale Rasic. In the opening match against East Germany, Alston performed a move to beat defender Konrad Weise that was used later in the tournament by Dutch international Johan Cruyff and became known as the "Cruyff Turn". He later commented on Cruyff's use of the move "I used to do this trick but not very often, [...] He must have practiced it for five days because five days later he did the same thing against Sweden".

Prior to the Australia side meeting West Germany in the group stage, during a press conference, German manager Helmut Schoen stated:

We have nothing to fear from Australia....apart from Adrian Alston

Alston started all three of Australia's matches at the tournament as they suffered defeats to East Germany and West Germany and drew 0–0 with Chile. He lost his place in the side soon after to John Kosmina but did return to play in the qualifying stages of the 1978 World Cup as Australia failed to qualify after a series of disappointing results and he was never called up for the side again. In total, he represented Australia between 1969 and 1977 in 37 official matches, scoring 6 goals. Alston represented New South Wales in 1974 as a player and led the selection of the Illawarra region as coach in 2004.

== Coaching career ==
After suffering the knee injury that ended his career, Alston's son Adrian Jr was diagnosed with Legg–Calvé–Perthes disease, a hip disorder. He soon spent the majority of his earnings made during his football career and moved back to England to set up a hotel with his brother Alec in Blackpool. However, after just four months, Alston grew unsettled and decided to return to Australia, eventually moving to Illawarra. Alston signed a three-year contract with the Wollongong City in 1983. Prior to the season seven of his players were sold to rival league clubs due to Wollongong's financial troubles. Wollongong finished second last in National Soccer League and Alston left the club.

In 1984, he was appointed coach of Corrimal Rangers in the second division in Illawarra regional competition after being recommended by his former Wollongong assistant Terry Hurley. After one season the side was promoted to the Illawarra Premier League, where they signed Alston's former Australian international teammate Attila Abonyi who would score 21 goals for the club in the 1985 season. Alston left the Rangers at the end of the 1989 season after six seasons in charge.

After a year long break from football, Alston was approached by Port Kembla and he became head coach for the 1991 season. Alston spent 13 seasons with Port Kembla; during that period the club won 26 trophies including five league titles, seven Grand Finals, and two Bert Bampton Cups. Alston left Port Kembla at the end of 2004 after securing his fourth League and Cup double. In 2005, he rejoined Wollongong Wolves who were playing in the NSW Premier League and he was once again handed a three-year contract. The side finished mid-table but, frustrated by financial and off the field issues, Alston walked out of the club after just one season.

In 2006, Alston joined Illawarra Premier League club Bulli; during his six seasons with the club, they finished 2nd on three occasions and featured in three Grand Finals. After leaving Bulli, Alston turned down several offers to return to coaching before working as a carer for adults with learning difficulties.

== Career statistics ==
=== International ===
Appearances and goals by national team and year
| National team | Year | Apps | Goals |
|---|---|---|---|
| Australia | 1969 | 3 | 0 |
| Australia | 1970 | 3 | 1 |
| Australia | 1971 | 3 | 1 |
| Australia | 1972 | 6 | 0 |
| Australia | 1973 | 11 | 4 |
| Australia | 1974 | 7 | 0 |
| Australia | 1975 | 0 | 0 |
| Australia | 1976 | 0 | 0 |
| Australia | 1977 | 4 | 0 |
| Total | | 37 | 6 |

List of international goals scored by Adrian Alston
| Goal | Date | Venue | Opponent | Score | Result | Competition |
|---|---|---|---|---|---|---|
| 1 | 4 November 1970 | Amjadieh Stadium, Tehran, Iran | Iran | 2–? | 2–1 | Friendly |
| 2 | 17 November 1970 | Leoforos Alexandras Stadium, Athens, Greece | Greece | 1–0 | 3–1 | Friendly |
| 3 | 11 November 1971 | Lang Park, Brisbane, Australia | Israel | 2–2 | 2–2 | Friendly |
| 4 | 11 March 1973 | Sydney Sports Ground, Sydney, Australia | Iraq | 2–0 | 3–1 | 1974 FIFA World Cup qualifying |
| 5 | 11 March 1973 | Sydney Sports Ground, Sydney, Australia | Iraq | 3–0 | 3–1 | 1974 FIFA World Cup qualifying |
| 6 | 13 March 1973 | Sydney Sports Ground, Sydney, Australia | Indonesia | 2–1 | 2–1 | 1974 FIFA World Cup qualifying |
| 7 | 18 August 1973 | Sydney Sports Ground, Sydney, Australia | Iran | 1–0 | 3–0 | 1974 FIFA World Cup qualifying |

Scores and results list Australia's goal tally first, score column indicates score after each Alston goal.

== Honours ==
South Coast United

- NSW First Division: 1969

Cardiff City

- Welsh Cup: 1976

Individual

- NSW First Division top goalscorer: 1968

== See also ==
- Foreign-born footballers who played for Australia
