= Jack Sargeant =

Jack Sargeant may refer to:

- Jack Sargeant (politician) (born 1994), Welsh politician
- Jack Sargeant (writer) (born 1968), British-Australian author

== See also ==
- Jack Sergeant (born 1995), Gibraltarian footballer
