= Jack Sergeant =

Gibraltarian footballer (born 1995)

Personal information
- Full name: John Iain Stephen Sergeant
- Date of birth: 27 February 1995 (age 31)
- Place of birth: Gibraltar
- Height: 1.76 m (5 ft 9 in)
- Positions: Defender; midfielder

Youth career
- 2008–2009: Sevilla
- 2011–2012: Atlético Zabal
- 2012–2013: AD Taraguilla

Senior career*
Years	Team	Apps	(Gls)
2013–2016	Manchester 62	46	(3)
2017	Lincoln Red Imps	0	(0)
2017–2019	West Didsbury & Chorlton	33	(0)
2018	→ Lincoln Red Imps (loan)	0	(0)
2019–2020	Europa	9	(1)
2020–2025	Lincoln Red Imps	64	(0)
2025	Cringila Lions	9	(0)

International career
2013–2014	Gibraltar U19	5	(0)
2013–2024	Gibraltar	61	(0)
- * Club domestic league appearances and goals as of 9 June 2025

John Iain Stephen Sergeant (born 27 February 1995) is a Gibraltarian footballer who last played for Illawarra Premier League side Cringila Lions, as a defender.

== Club career ==
Sergeant appeared for Sevilla FC's youth setup, and had a stint with Atlético Zabal before graduating from AD Taraguilla. In the 2013 summer, he moved to Manchester 62. In summer 2016 he moved to England to study a fire and rescue management degree at Blackburn College awarded by Lancaster University.

On 17 August 2017 he signed for Lincoln Red Imps. On 30 October 2017, Sergeant signed for West Didsbury & Chorlton. For his performances, in which he played 24 games for the club, he was awarded Manager's Player of the Year in May 2018. In July he briefly played for Lincoln Red Imps for their UEFA Europa League campaign before completing his spell at West. During his final year at the club, he shared a house in Hulme with international and West teammate Jamie Coombes. After spending a season at Europa upon his return to the Rock, in July 2020 he re-signed for Lincoln.

== International career ==
After appearing and captaining the Gibraltar U19's, Sergeant made his debut with the full squad on 19 November 2013, in a 0–0 draw against Slovakia.

After being uncapped since 2016, when he moved to the UK, Sergeant returned to the national team in March 2018 for the friendly against Latvia. He played the full game, getting booked late on, as Gibraltar held on for a historic 1–0 victory. In doing so, he also set a record as first West Didsbury & Chorlton player to be capped while at the club in their 109-year history. He captained the side for the first time in a 4–1 defeat to Montenegro on 27 March 2021.

== Career statistics ==
=== International ===
Gibraltar
Year	Apps	Goals
2013	1	0
2014	5	0
2015	3	0
2016	2	0
2017	0	0
2018	7	0
2019	10	0
2020	6	0
2021	8	0
2022	6	0
2023	10	0
2024	3	0
Total	61	0

== Honours ==
Lincoln Red Imps

- Gibraltar National League: 2020–21
- Gibraltar National League: 2021–22
