= Alec Alston =

English footballer

Personal information
- Date of birth: 26 February 1937
- Place of birth: Preston, England
- Date of death: 23 February 2009 (aged 71)
- Position: Forward

Senior career*
Years	Team	Apps	(Gls)
- Netherfield
1957–1962	Preston North End	102	(26)
1963–1965	Bury	86	(22)
1966–1967	Barrow	47	(14)
1967–1968	Fleetwood	35	(15)
Total		270	(77)
- * Club domestic league appearances and goals

Alec Alston (26 February 1937 – 23 February 2009) was an English footballer who played in the Football League for Barrow, Bury and Preston North End. His brother Adrian was also a professional footballer, representing Australia at international level. Both brothers played together for Fleetwood in season 1967–68.
