= Shohei Okuno =

Japanese footballer (born 1990)

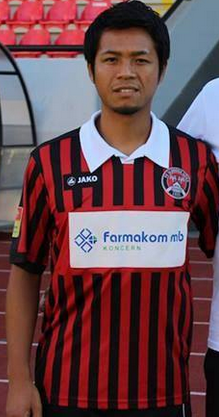
- Okuno with Sloboda in 2013

Personal information
- Date of birth: 18 August 1990 (age 36)
- Place of birth: Tokyo, Japan
- Height: 1.78 m (5 ft 10 in)
- Positions: Midfielder; striker

Team information
- Current team: Fukui United
- Number: 14

Youth career
- 2003–2006: Gamba Osaka
- 2006–2009: Kokoku High School

College career
Years	Team	Apps	(Gls)
2009–2013	Hannan University		

Senior career*
Years	Team	Apps	(Gls)
2013	Auda Rīga	10	(8)
2013–2014	Sloboda Užice	29	(1)
2014	Pogoń Szczecin	5	(0)
2014	Pogoń Szczecin II	1	(0)
2015	Bytovia Bytów	7	(0)
2016–2018	Albion Park White Eagles		
2019	Maccabi Hakoah	20	(1)
2020–	Fukui United	46	(0)
- * Club domestic league appearances and goals as of 18 August 2024

Shohei Okuno (奥野 将平, Okuno Shōhei; born 18 August 1990) is a Japanese professional footballer who plays for Fukui United.

== Career ==
Born in Tokyo, Okuno joined Latvian First League side FK Auda in 2013. In the summer of 2013, after a successful trial he signed with Serbian SuperLiga club FK Sloboda Užice. He joined the club along with another Japanese player, also coming from Latvia, Keisuke Ogawa, who joined from FC Jūrmala. Okuno made his league debut on 18 August 2013 against FK Čukarički. He scored his first goal for the club on 29 September 2013 against Radnički 1923.

In 2014, he moved to Polish Ekstraklasa side Pogoń Szczecin. On 3 February 2015, he moved to another Polish club, Bytovia Bytów, playing in I liga.

During the winter break of the 2015–16 season, he left Poland and settled in Australia where he joined Albion Park White Eagles.
