= Kemblawarra Fury FC =

Kemblawarra Dapto Fury
- Full name: Kemblawarra Dapto Fury Football Club
- Nickname: Fury
- Founded: 2016 (as Kemblawarra Fury)
- Dissolved: 2017
- Ground: Macedonia Park (Ground share)
- Capacity: 5000
- Chairman: Paul Morgan
- Manager: Luke Mcguire
- League: Illawarra Premier League
- 2016: 1st
- Website: www.kemblawarradaptofuryfc.com.au

Kemblawarra Fury is a former football club based in Dapto and Kemblawarra in New South Wales. The Dapto club was established in 2012 and merged with Kemblawarra in 2016. They were dissolved in 2017.

== History ==
In early 2012, Champion Premier League side Dandaloo Football Club made an agreement to amalgamate with their local derby rivals and recently relegated Div. 1 team the Dapto Soccer Club. This created a new entity titled "Dapto Dandaloo Fury.

On 26 September 2017, the club posted a statement on their Facebook page saying, the club "will close operations at the completion of the financial year at our Annual General Meeting."

== Honours ==
- 2012 Illawarra Mercury Premier League – Winners
- 2012 Illawarra Mercury Premier League Grand Final – Winners
- 2012 Fraternity Cup – Winners
- 2012 Bampton Cup – Winners
- 2015 Illawarra Mercury Premier League – Winners
