= Wollongong Olympic FC =

Wollongong Olympic Football Club
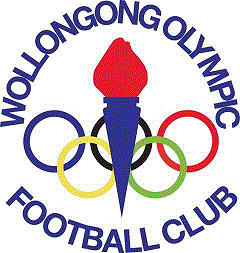
- Full name: Wollongong Olympic Football Club
- Nickname: Olympic
- Founded: 1963; 63 years ago
- Ground: PCYC, North Wollongong, New South Wales
- Capacity: 250 (seated)
- Chairman: Greg Haritos
- Manager: Paul Mazmanidis
- League: Illawarra Premier League
- 2026: 1st of 12 (premiers)
- Website: https://wollongongolympicfc.com/

Wollongong Olympic Football Club, often referred to as "Olympic" are semi-professional association football team based in North Wollongong, New South Wales. They compete in the Illawarra Premier League. The club was formed during the 20th century, initially called "Aris FC" and then renamed "Wollongong Olympic FC" in 1990. FC). They play out of Herb Clunis Oval which is in the North Wollongong branch of the PCYC, and are the owners of Wollongong United Football club.

== Honours ==
(New South Wales) Illawarra Premier League First Grade

Minor Premierships (3) 1994, 2019, 2024

Premierships (Grand Final) (4) 1985, 2022, 2024, 2025

Bert Bampton Cup Winners (4) 1986, 2016, 2018, 2023, 2025

Grand Finalists (4) 1993, 1994, 2000, 2019

Done the double double dis dat 2024 and 2025.

(New South Wales) Illawarra Premier League Youth Grade

Premierships (1) 1991

Grand Final Wins (2) 1990, 1991

== Awards ==
Illawarra Premier League Player Of The Year

- Peter Kotamanidis (1997), Yuseke Ueda (2018)

Premier League Leading Goal Scorer

- Yuseke Ueda (2018)

== Notable players and Coaches ==
- John Fleming
- Peter Kotamanidis
- Abbas Saad
- Peter Zorbas
- Stuart Young
- Chris Jackson
- Yusuke Ueda
- George Antoniou
- Anthony Guido
- Micky Atsas
- Josh Macdonald
- Matthew Bailey
- Jason madonis ( greatest ipl player in history)
