= Wollongong United FC =

Association football club in Australia

Wollongong United
- Full name: Wollongong United Football Club / Фудбалски клуб Волонгонг Македонија
- Nicknames: Lions, United, Macedonia
- Founded: 1976; 50 years ago
- Ground: Macedonia Park
- Capacity: 10,000
- President: Peter Vrtkovski
- Coach: Andrew Paine
- League: Illawarra Premier League
- 2026: 4th of 12 (champions)
Home colours	Away colours

Wollongong United FC is an Australian soccer club based in Wollongong, currently competing in the Illawarra Premier League. The club played in the 1991 season of the National Soccer League under the name Wollongong Macedonia, where it finished last.

== History ==
Formed in 1976 by the "Macedonian Orthodox Community of Wollongong", the club was originally established on behalf of the Macedonian Australian community of Wollongong. With a huge supporter base, the club was originally known as Wollongong United Soccer Club. Since then it has also been known as Wollongong Macedonia, as represented in the National Soccer League (NSL) 1990.

Upon entering the Premier League in the Illawarra Second division, the club quickly advanced in 1980 to enter the NSW Second division, finishing second at season end on its first attempt.

In 1986, the club reached the top competition in NSW Division 1, today known as NSW National Premier League. Wollongong United F.C completed the season undefeated, to this day, the only club in NSW to do so (Except for Eastern Suburbs Hakoah in 1971 and Croatia Sydney in 1981). In 1990 the club claim their first title in NSW Division 1 History, This success led the club to the pinnacle of Australian soccer.

=== Post-NSL ===
Between 1991 and 2004, the club played in the NSW State League with a strong, consistent representation in both junior and senior ranks. In 1992, the club rename as Illawarra Lions in NSW Super League and again in 2003 as Wollongong United FC in NSW State League.

In 2004 the club evaluated its position and it was deemed, in the best interests of the club, its members, supporters and sponsors to return to the local Illawarra Football Association. In 2005, the club competed in the IFA First Division with an aim to return to the IFA Premier League. Wollongong United finished second and gained promotion into the Premier League for the 2006 season. Wollongong United has reached four grand finals in the years since (2015, 2018, 2020, 2026), winning the competition in 2015, 2020 and 2026. The club remains in the now Football South Coast Illawarra Premier League.

== Australia Cup ==

2022 Australia Cup Round of 32 starting lineup Wollongong United 2 – 3 Green Gully SC

On July 27, 2022, Wollongong United FC faced Green Gully SC in the Australia Cup at Ian McLennan Park in Kembla Grange, New South Wales. The match was a closely contested affair, ultimately ending in a 3-2 victory for Green Gully. Despite Wollongong United's strong effort and a spirited fightback that saw them equalise during the match, they were unable to maintain the momentum. Green Gully’s decisive goal in the later stages secured their advancement in the tournament, highlighting the competitive nature of the Australia Cup and the growing prominence of both teams in Australian football. This match marked a significant chapter in Wollongong United's cup campaign, reflecting their resilience and determination on the national stage.

== Players ==
=== Current squad ===
Note: Flags indicate national team as defined under FIFA eligibility rules; some limited exceptions apply. Players may hold more than one non-FIFA nationality.

No.	Pos.	Nation	Player
1	GK	AUS	Tom Alston
2	DF	AUS	Samuel Matthews
4	DF	AUS	Jarrod Lasala
5	DF	MKD	Danny Lazarevski
6	MF	MKD	Daniel Geroski
7	FW	AUS	Van Elia
9	FW	AUS	Jayden Makowski
10	FW	MKD	Jordan Nikolovski
11	FW	AUS	Nav Darjani
15	MF	MKD	Joshua Galevski
17	MF	AUS	Jason Zufic

No.	Pos.	Nation	Player
23	MF	JPN	Mitsuo Yamada
27	DF	MKD	Bailey Babarovski
29	MF	AUS	Sebastian Stanojevic
30	MF	MKD	Klime Sekutkoski
31	DF	AUS	Brent McCance
32	DF	MKD	James Stojanovski
37	FW	AUS	Preston Ridley
81	GK	AUS	David Zufic

== Notable former players ==
- (Australia) Scott Chipperfield – Australian international
- (Australia) Mile Sterjovski – Australian international
- (North Macedonia) Zlatko Nastevski – Australian international
- Robbie Shields – Republic of Ireland youth international
- (Japan) Kazuto Kushida – professional Japanese footballer
- (Japan) Yosuke Akiyama – professional Japanese footballer
- (Australia) Nathan Elasi – Australian youth international

== Honours ==
- NSW 1st Division
  - Winners: 1990
- NSW 1st Division
  - Premiership: 1990
- NSW 2nd Division
  - Premiership: 1985
- Illawarra Premier League
  - Winners: 2015, 2020, 2026
- Illawarra Premier League
  - Premiership: 2022, 2025
- Illawarra Second Division (third tier)
  - Champions: 1977
- Illawarra Second Division (third tier)
  - Premiership: 1977
- Bert Bampton Cup
  - Winners: 1978, 2012, 2014, 2015, 2020
