= Cringila Lions FC =

Cringila Lions Football Club
- Nicknames: Crini, Lions
- Founded: 1968
- Ground: John Crehan Park
- Capacity: 7,500
- Manager: Alvin Ceccoli
- League: Illawarra Premier League
- 2026: 3rd of 12
Home colours	Away colours

Cringila Lions FC is an Australian soccer club based in Cringila, New South Wales. The team currently participates in the Illawarra Premier League.

Cringila Lions Football Club is a prominent football club that was established in 1968 by the local Macedonian community of Wollongong. The club is sometimes referred to as Cringila United, Cringila United Soccer Club, Cringila Lions Soccer Club, and Cringila Lions Football Club.

The club hosts its home matches at John Crehan Park, a multi-use stadium located on Merrett Avenue, Cringila. The venue has a capacity of 7,500 and features a stand along one side, a small function room behind one goal, and an additional secondary ground. John Crehan underwent a lighting upgrade, which has further established John Crehan Park as a leading football ground within the Illawarra region.

Cringila Lions FC continues to be a vital part of the local community, fostering talent and promoting the sport within the Illawarra region.

== Honours ==
Cringila Lions First Grade
Grand Final Champions (2): 1993, 1994
League Champions (3): 1979, 1993, 1998
Grand Final Runners-up (2): 1997, 2023
Bert Bampton Cup Winners (4): 1993, 1994, 2000, 2001
Corrimal Leagues Club Knock-Out Winners (2):1994, 2008

Cringila Lions Reserve Grade
Grand Final Winners (1): 2018
Second Division League Champions (1): 1977
Bert Bampton Cup Winners (1): 2008

Cringila Lions Youth Grade
Grand Final Champions (2): 1994, 2024
League Champions (3): 1988, 2002, 2024
Grand Final Runners-up (1): 2023
Fernhill Cup Champions (1): 2024
Youth Cup Winners (1): 1994
