= Port Kembla FC =

- Full name: Port Kembla Football Club
- Nickname: 'Azzuri'
- Founded: 1966; 60 years ago
- Ground: Wetherall Park, Primbee
- Capacity: 1,000
- Chairman: Sean Till
- Coach: Chad Bishop
- League: Illawarra Premier League
- 2026: 10th of 12
Home colours

Port Kembla Football Club are an Australian semi-professional association football club based in Port Kembla, New South Wales. It participates in the regions semi-professional competition, the Illawarra Premier League.

Port Kembla FC home ground is Wetherall Park, located in the suburb of Primbee on the Port Kembla peninsula.

The club is the most successful of all the Illawarra Premier League teams having won both the Premiership seven times, and the Championship nine times. Port Kembla has also won the Bert Bampton Cup – the knockout club competition for the region – a record five times.

The first premiership, grand final and Bert Bampton Cup success was achieved in 1995 under head coach and 1974 Australian World Cup player Adrian Noddy Alston.

The club has had several well-known footballers play with the club, including ex A league and NSL players Jeromy Harris, Jon Angelucci, Mineo Bonetig, Tony Pezzano, Jock Morlando, Daniel Beltrame, Robbie Davies, Dominic Longo, Andrew Ravanello and Port Kembla junior and current A-League player Corey Gameiro.

== History ==
=== Foundation ===
Port Kembla FC was founded in 1966 by a group of Italian migrants in the Marina coffee lounge in Warrawong. Soon they began playing matches against a group of players from the Italo coffee lounge in neighbouring Port Kembla with the losers having to pay for the winners dinner. Eventually both sides got together and decided it would be a better idea to form a single club and enter it into a local competition. With the majority of the players being of Italian heritage and background, they decided to call the club Warrawong Azzurri however this was unsuccessful as the head football body Soccer Australia were trying to eliminate ethnic names for football clubs in the aim of reducing tensions between rival ethnic backgrounds. A further application of Lake Heights Blues was similarly rejected on the same grounds. However the president of former Port Kembla club Port Kembla Dunubia approached the group and inquired if they were interested in taking Danubia's spot in the local competition. Both parties agreed, and having settled upon the name of Port Kembla FC the club was born.

=== Illawarra Premier League ===
Port Kembla initially struggled to find a permanent home ground for the first couple of decades, playing in local parks until 1980 when they received permission to build a ground in nearby Primbee – Wetherall Park -, which is their home ground still today. Success would not come easily, not quickly for Port Kembla with the club not winning their first silverware in the Illawarra Premier League until 1995 when they won both the Premiership and Grand final, 29 years after their foundation. After winning the 1996 grand final, they wouldn't see further success until the flood gates literally opened post-2000, when they finished first 4 consecutive seasons (2000 to 2004), as well as backing up and winning the grand final in 2000, 2003, and 2004. They won the premiership against in 2010, and won both the premiership and grand final in 2013 and won the grand final in 2017.

== Honours ==
- Illawarra Premier League

Premiers (7): 1995, 2000, 2001, 2003, 2004, 2010, 2013
Grand Final Winners (9): 1995, 1996, 1999, 2000, 2002, 2003, 2004, 2013, 2017

- Bert Bampton Cup

Winners (4): 1991, 1995, 1998, 2005, 2007

- Premier League Player of the Year

(1999) Mineo Bonetig, (2001) Michael Clare

- Premier League Golden Boot

(2001) Nick Polimenakos, (2003, 2004) Shane McGirr, (2013) Nuno Peres

== Notable former players and coaches ==
- (Australia) Corey Gameiro – Junior player at the club, Formerly playing in the A-League with Brisbane Roar and Central Coast Mariners.
- / Adrian Alston – English born footballer who represented Australia 43 times, scoring 7 goals from 1969 to 1970, including at Australia's inaugural FIFA World Cup in West Germany in 1974 where West German coach Helmut Schön famously stated "We have nothing to fear from Australia....apart from Adrian Alston". Played professionally in England with Luton Town and Cardiff City in the 1970s. Alston was head coach of Port Kembla from 1997 to 2004 when they achieved most of their success.
