= Illawarra Premier League =

- Founded: 1977
- Country: Australia
- State: NSW
- Number of clubs: 12
- Level on pyramid: 4
- Relegation to: Illawarra Premier League 2
- Domestic cup(s): Australia Cup; Fraternity Club Cup; Bert Bampton Cup
- Current champions: Wollongong United (3rd) 2026
- Current premiers: Wollongong Olympic (4th) 2026
- Website: footballsouthcoast.com

The Illawarra Premier League is a regional Australian semi-professional association football league, comprising teams from the Illawarra, and South Coast regions of New South Wales. The competition is run under the Football South Coast body, an associate of Football NSW – a member federation of Football Federation Australia. It therefore fits below the national A-League and NSW wide divisions including National Premier Leagues NSW, The league sits at level 3 on the New South Wales league system, making it a level league 4 in the Australian League System. The major sponsor for the Illawarra Premier League is the Illawarra Mercury and as such the competition is often referred to as the Illawarra Premier League or South Coast Premier League..

== History ==
The Illawarra Premier League was founded in 1977 with Berkeley taking out the inaugural championship, defeating Fairy Meadow 1-0 in the grand final. Fairy Meadow had won the inaugural Premiership.

== Format ==
The competition consists of 12 teams from around the Wollongong, Illawarra, and South Coast regions of New South Wales. Each team plays each other twice, to form a 22-round, round robin format. 5 teams progress to a month-long finals series. The final two teams play-off in a grand final to determine the winner.

== Clubs ==
The following clubs competed in the 2027 Illawarra Premier League

Club	Location	Ground
Albion Park White Eagles	Albion Park	Terry Reserve
Berkeley Sports FC	Berkeley	Berkeley Sports Park
Bulli FC	Bulli	Balls Paddock
Coniston FC	Coniston	JJ Kelly Park
Cringila Lions	Cringila	John Crehan Park
Helensburgh Thistles	Helensburgh	Rex Jackson Park
Oak Flats Falcons	Oak Flats	Keith Bond Oval
Port Kembla	Port Kembla	Wetherall Park
Shellharbour FC	Barrack Heights	Barrack Heights Sports Field
South Coast Croatia	Kembla Grange	Sir Ian McLennan Park
Wollongong Olympic	Wollongong	Herb Clunis Oval
Wollongong United	Berkeley	Macedonia Park

== Honours ==
Port Kembla FC are the most successful Illawarra Premier League club, with 9 grand final wins, and 7 Premierships since the league's inception in 1977.

Year	Premiers	Grand Final Champions
1977	Fairy Meadow (1st)	Berkeley (1st)
1978	Berkeley (1st)	Tarrawanna (1st)
1979	Fairy Meadow (2nd)	Fairy Meadow (1st)
1980	Fairy Meadow (3rd)	Fairy Meadow (2nd)
1981 (Note: http://www.socceraust.co.uk/1981/ILL/PL/fixtures.html)	Shellharbour Workers (1st)	Coniston (1st)
1982	Wests/Figtree (1st)	Wests/Figtree (1st)
1983	Wests/Figtree (2nd)	Wests/Figtree (2nd)
1984	Fernhill FC (1st)	Fernhill FC (1st)
1985	Bulli FC (1st)	Aris FC (1st)
1986	Bulli FC (2nd)	Bulli FC (1st)
1987	South Coast Croatia (1st)	South Coast Croatia (1st)
1988	Bulli FC (3rd)	Wests/Figtree (3rd)
1989 (Note: http://www.socceraust.co.uk/1989/ILL/PL/fixtures.html)	South Coast Croatia (2nd)	Wests/Figtree (4th)
1990	Wests/Figtree (3rd)	Wests/Figtree (5th)
1991	Wests/Figtree (4th)	Balgownie Rangers (1st)
1992	Coniston Makedonija (1st)	Wests/Figtree (6th)
1993	Cringila Lions (1st)	Cringila Lions (1st)
1994	Wollongong Olympic (1st)	Cringila Lions (2nd)
1995	Port Kembla (1st)	Port Kembla (1st)
1996	Lysaghts FC (1st)	Port Kembla (2nd)
1997	Lysaghts FC (2nd)	Lysaghts FC (1st)
1998	Cringila Lions (2nd)	Wollongong White Eagles (1st)
1999	Northern United (1st)	Port Kembla (3rd)
2000	Port Kembla (2nd)	Port Kembla (4th)
2001	Port Kembla (3rd)	Coniston Lions (2nd)
2002	Kemblawarra (1st)	Port Kembla (5th)
2003	Port Kembla (4th)	Port Kembla (6th)
2004	Port Kembla (5th)	Port Kembla (7th)
2005	Dandaloo FC (1st)	Picton Rangers (1st)
2006	Dandaloo FC (2nd)	Picton Rangers (2nd)
2007	Dandaloo FC (3rd)	Albion Park White Eagles (2nd)
2008	Albion Park White Eagles (1st)	Albion Park White Eagles (3rd)
2009	Dandaloo FC (4th)	Dandaloo FC (1st)
2010	Port Kembla (6th)	Dandaloo FC (2nd)
2011	Dandaloo FC (5th)	Dandaloo FC (3rd)
2012	Dapto Dandaloo Fury FC (6th)	Dapto Dandaloo Fury FC (4th)
2013	Port Kembla (7th)	Port Kembla (8th)
2014	Bulli FC (4th)	Dapto Dandaloo Fury FC (5th)
2015	Dapto Dandaloo Fury FC (7th)	Wollongong United (1st)
2016	Kemblawarra Fury (1st)	Albion Park White Eagles (4th)
2017	Bulli FC (5th)	Port Kembla (9th)
2018	Bulli FC (6th)	Bulli FC (2nd)
2019	Wollongong Olympic (2nd)	Corrimal Rangers (1st)
2020 (Note: Half-season due to the impacts from the COVID-19 pandemic)	Woonona Sharks (1st)	Wollongong United (2nd)
2021	Cancelled due to the COVID-19 pandemic in Australia. (Note: Half-season due to the impacts from the COVID-19 pandemic)	
2022	Wollongong United (1st)	Wollongong Olympic (2nd)
2023	Albion Park White Eagles (2nd)	Coniston FC (2nd)
2024	Wollongong Olympic (3rd)	Wollongong Olympic (3rd)
2025	Wollongong United (2nd)	Wollongong Olympic (4th)
2026	Wollongong Olympic (4th)	Wollongong United (3rd)

Source: (Note: http://www.ozfootball.net/ark/States/NSW/IPLC.html)

== George Naylor Medalist ==
The George Naylor Medal goes to the player of the season.

Year	Winner	Runner/s up
2016	Shohei Okuno	N/A
2017	Guy Knight	Ricky Goodchild
