= Albion Park White Eagles FC =

Albion Park White Eagles
- Full name: Albion Park White Eagles
- Nickname: White Eagles
- Founded: 2000
- Ground: Terry Reserve
- Capacity: 5000
- President: Goran Nikolic
- Manager: Jason Davkovski
- League: Illawarra Premier League
- 2024: 3rd of 12
Home colours	Away colours

Albion Park White Eagles is a mainly Serbian Australian-backed football club based in the suburb of Albion Park, a suburb of Wollongong, New South Wales.

== History ==
Established in 2000, the White Eagles amalgamated with Albion Park Soccer Club (which was formed in 1975) to form the Albion Park White Eagles as it is known today.

== Notable players ==
- (Guinea) Ballamodou Conde – 17 international caps
- (Japan) Shohei Okuno – 2016 George Naylor Medalist

== Honours ==
- Illawarra Premier League Grand Final Winners
  - 1998(Wollongong White Eagles), 2007, 2008, 2016
- Illawarra Premier League Premiers
  - 2008, 2023
- Illawarra First Division Grand Final
  - 2001, 2002
- Illawarra First Division Premiers
  - 2002
- Illawarra Premier League Reserve Grade Grand Final Winners
  - 2003
- Illawarra Premier League Youth Grade Premiers
  - 2005
- Karadjordje Cup Winners
  - 2005
