= 2024–25 Macarthur FC season =

Macarthur FC
2024–25 season
- Manager: Mile Sterjovski
- Stadium: Campbelltown Sports Stadium
- A-League Men: 8th
- A-League Men Finals: DNQ
- Australia Cup: Winners
- Top goalscorer: League: Marin Jakoliš (10); All: Marin Jakoliš (13)
- Highest home attendance: 9,213 vs. Western Sydney Wanderers (3 May 2025); A-League Men
- Lowest home attendance: 3,312 vs. Brisbane Roar (30 November 2024); A-League Men
- Average home league attendance: 4,662
- Biggest win: 6–1 vs. Perth Glory (H) (20 October 2024); A-League Men
- Biggest defeat: 0–2 vs. Sydney FC (A) (1 March 2025); A-League Men
Home colours	Away colours
- All statistics correct as of 3 May 2025.

The 2024–25 season was Macarthur Football Club's fifth season in the A-League Men. In addition to the domestic league, Macarthur FC participated in this season's editions of the Australia Cup.

== Players ==
Note: Flags indicate national team as defined under FIFA eligibility rules; some limited exceptions apply. Players may hold more than one non-FIFA nationality.

No.	Pos.	Nation	Player
5	DF	AUS	Matthew Jurman
6	DF	AUS	Tomislav Uskok
7	MF	AUS	Daniel De Silva
8	MF	AUS	Jake Hollman
9	FW	AUS	Chris Ikonomidis
11	MF	AUS	Peter Makrillos
12	GK	POL	Filip Kurto
13	DF	AUS	Ivan Vujica
14	MF	AUS	Kristian Popovic
17	MF	AUS	Oliver Randazzo (scholarship)
18	DF	AUS	Walter Scott
20	DF	AUS	Kealey Adamson
21	FW	AUS	Bernardo Oliveira

No.	Pos.	Nation	Player
22	MF	AUS	Liam Rose
23	MF	AUS	Frans Deli (scholarship)
24	FW	AUS	Dean Bosnjak (scholarship)
26	MF	AUS	Luke Brattan (captain)
27	DF	AUS	Joshua Damevski (scholarship)
28	FW	AUS	Harry Sawyer
30	GK	AUS	Alexander Robinson
33	DF	AUS	Yianni Nicolaou
35	FW	AUS	Henrique Oliveira (scholarship)
39	DF	CIV	Kévin Boli
44	FW	CRO	Marin Jakoliš
95	MF	TUN	Saîf-Eddine Khaoui

== Transfers ==
=== Transfers in ===
No.	Position	Player	Transferred from	Type/fee	Contract length	Date	Ref.
26	MF	Luke Brattan	Unattached	Free transfer	1 year	4 June 2024	
44	FW	(Croatia) Marin Jakoliš	(France) Angers	Free transfer	1 year	15 June 2024	
22	MF	Liam Rose	(United States) El Paso Locomotive	Free transfer	2 years	20 June 2024	
9	FW	Chris Ikonomidis	Unattached	Free transfer	2 years	22 June 2024	
27	DF	Joshua Damevski	Melbourne City NPL	Scholarship	2 years	29 July 2024	
7	MF	Daniel De Silva	Unattached	Free transfer	1 year	28 August 2024	
28	FW	Harry Sawyer	(Australia) South Melbourne	Free transfer	2 years	15 September 2024	
15	DF	(Belgium) Dino Arslanagić	Unattached	Free transfer	1 year	16 September 2024	
35	FW	Henrique Oliveira	(Australia) FFSA NTC	Free transfer	Scholarship contract	2 January 2025	
11	MF	Peter Makrillos	Unattached	Free transfer	5 months	29 January 2025	
95	MF	(Tunisia) Saîf-Eddine Khaoui	Unattached	Free transfer	5 months	3 February 2025	
39	DF	(Ivory Coast) Kévin Boli	Unattached	Free transfer	5 months	4 February 2025	

==== From youth squad ====
N	Pos.	Nat.	Name	Age	Notes
24	FW	(Australia)	Dean Bosnjak	17	scholarship contract

=== Transfers out ===
No.	Position	Player	Transferred to	Type/fee	Date	Ref.
17	FW	Raphael Borges Rodrigues	(England) Coventry City	Undisclosed	24 May 2024	
2	DF	Jake McGing	Retired		28 May 2024	
36	FW	Ali Auglah	Unattached	Mutual contract termination	28 May 2024	
1	GK	Danijel Nizic	Unattached	End of contract	3 June 2024	
3	DF	(New Zealand) Tommy Smith	Auckland FC	End of contract	3 June 2024	
7	MF	Daniel De Silva	Unattached	End of contract	3 June 2024	
15	MF	Kearyn Baccus	Unattached	End of contract	3 June 2024	
19	MF	Jesper Webber	Unattached	End of contract	3 June 2024	
24	MF	(Tanzania) Charles M'Mombwa	Unattached	End of contract	3 June 2024	
27	MF	Jerry Skotadis	Unattached	End of contract	3 June 2024	
44	DF	Matthew Millar	Unattached	End of contract	3 June 2024	
10	MF	(Mexico) Ulises Dávila	Unattached	Mutual contract termination	24 June 2024	
15	FW	Lachlan Rose	Newcastle Jets	Mutual contract termination	18 July 2024	
23	MF	(New Zealand) Clayton Lewis	Unattached	Contract terminated	19 September 2024	
15	DF	(Belgium) Dino Arslanagić	(Turkey) Manisa	Mutual contract termination	22 January 2025	
19	FW	Ariath Piol	(United States) Real Salt Lake	$830,000	23 January 2025	
16	DF	Oliver Jones	(Denmark) Randers	$400,000	28 January 2025	
11	FW	Jed Drew	(Austria) TSV Hartberg	Undisclosed	30 January 2025	
98	FW	(France) Valère Germain	(Japan) Sanfrecce Hiroshima	Mutual contract termination	17 February 2025	

=== Contract extensions ===
No.	Name	Position	Duration	Date	Ref.
30	Alexander Robinson	GK	2 years	14 May 2024	
19	Ariath Piol	FW	2 years	27 May 2024	
18	Walter Scott	DF	1 year	6 June 2024	
16	Oliver Jones	DF	3 years	8 January 2025	Contract extended from end of 2024–25 until end of 2027–28.

== Pre-season and friendlies ==
Win Draw Loss

5 October 2024	Western Sydney Wanderers (Australia)	Cancelled	(Australia) Macarthur FC	Sydney
11:00 AEST		Cancellation		Stadium: Wanderers Football Park

== Competitions ==
=== Overall record ===
Competition	First match	Last match	Starting round	Final position	Record							
Competition	First match	Last match	Starting round	Final position	Pld	W	D	L	GF	GA	GD	Win %
A-League Men	20 October 2024	3 May 2025	Matchday 1	8th	26	9	6	11	50	45	+5	34.62
Australia Cup	30 July 2024	29 September 2024	Round of 32	Winners	5	5	0	0	9	4	+5	100.00
Total					31	14	6	11	59	49	+10	45.16

Last updated: 3 May 2025
Source: Competitions

=== A-League Men ===
==== League table ====
Pos	Team	Pld	W	D	L	GF	GA	GD	Pts	Qualification
6	Adelaide United	26	10	8	8	53	55	−2	38	Qualification for Finals series (Note: The top two teams enter the finals series at the semi-finals, while the teams ranked third to sixth enter the finals series at the elimination-finals.)
7	Sydney FC	26	10	7	9	53	46	+7	37	
8	Macarthur FC	26	9	6	11	50	45	+5	33	Qualification for AFC Champions League Two (Note: Qualified for AFC Champions League Two as the 2024 Australia Cup winners.)
9	Newcastle Jets	26	8	6	12	43	44	−1	30	
10	Central Coast Mariners	26	5	11	10	29	51	−22	26	Qualification for 2025 Australia Cup play-offs

Source: A-Leagues
Rules for classification: 1) points; 2) goal difference; 3) goals scored; 4) wins; 5) head-to-head results; 5a) head-to-head points; 5b) head-to-head goal difference; 6) Fair Play points; 7) away goal difference; 8) away goals per match; 9) home goal difference; 10) home goals per match; 11) toss of a coin in an event of a tie of two clubs.

==== Results summary ====
Overall								Home						Away					
Pld	W	D	L	GF	GA	GD	Pts	W	D	L	GF	GA	GD	W	D	L	GF	GA	GD
26	9	6	11	50	45	+5	33	2	4	6	22	24	−2	7	2	5	28	21	+7

Last updated: 3 May 2025.
Source: Ultimate A-League
Away figures include Macarthur FC's 1–0 loss on neutral ground against Auckland FC on 24 November 2024.

==== Results by round ====
Round	1	2	3	4	5	6	7	8	9	10	11	12	13	14	15	16	17	18	19	20	21	22	23	24	25	26	27	28	29
Ground	H	H	A	A	N	H	A	A	H	A	A	H	A	B	H	H	A	H	A	B	H	A	A	H	A	B	A	H	H
Result	W	L	L	W	L	D	D	W	D	W	W	L	W	X	L	W	L	D	L	X	L	L	W	D	W	X	D	L	L
Position	1	4	7	6	7	7	8	5	5	4	2	5	4	6	3	6	5	7	8	8	8	8	8	8	8	8	8	8	8
Points	3	3	3	6	6	7	8	11	12	15	18	18	18	21	21	24	24	25	25	25	25	25	28	29	32	32	33	33	33

Updated to match(es) played on 3 May 2025. Source: Ultimate A-League
A = Away; H = Home; N = Neutral; B = Bye; W = Win; D = Draw; L = Loss; X = Bye

==== Matches ====
Win Draw Loss Fixtures

20 October 2024 1	Macarthur FC	6–1	Perth Glory	Sydney
16:00 AEDT	Drew 7'; Hollman 10'; Uskok 21'; Jakoliš 30', 45+1'; Germain 61'	Report	Bugarija 73'	Stadium: Campbelltown Sports Stadium; Attendance: 4,002; Referee: Ben Abraham

25 October 2024 2	Macarthur FC	1–2	Newcastle Jets	Sydney
19:35 AEDT	Jakoliš 19'	Report	Adams 56', 60'	Stadium: Campbelltown Sports Stadium; Attendance: 3,809; Referee: Tim Danaskos

3 November 2024 3	Melbourne Victory	2–1	Macarthur FC	Melbourne
16:00 AEDT	Arzani 69' (pen.); Piscopo 75'	Report	Germain 51'	Stadium: AAMI Park; Attendance: 11,087; Referee: Jack Morgan

9 November 2024 4	Sydney FC	1–2	Macarthur FC	Sydney
19:35 AEDT	Wood 88'	Report	Piol 73'; Jakoliš 90+6'	Stadium: Allianz Stadium; Attendance: 12,194; Referee: Casey Reibelt

24 November 2024 5	Macarthur FC	0–1	Auckland FC	Sydney
16:00 AEDT		Report	May 34'	Stadium: Allianz Stadium; Attendance: 4,826; Referee: Ben Abraham

30 November 2024 6	Macarthur FC	4–4	Brisbane Roar	Sydney
18:35 AEDT	Adamson 44'; Uskok 51'; De Silva 79'; Germain 83'	Report	Adams 5', 29'; Arslanagić 67' (o.g.); Uskok 90+3' (o.g.)	Stadium: Campbelltown Sports Stadium; Attendance: 3,312; Referee: Daniel Elder

7 December 2024 7	Western United	0–0	Macarthur FC	Melbourne
18:00 AEDT		Report		Stadium: Ironbark Fields; Attendance: 2,867; Referee: Alex King

14 December 2024 8	Wellington Phoenix	1–2	Macarthur FC	Wellington
17:00 NZDT	Barbarouses 44'	Report	Germain 7'; Bosnjak 75'	Stadium: Sky Stadium; Attendance: 7,384; Referee: Campbell-Kirk Kawana-Waugh

23 December 2024 9	Macarthur FC	1–1	Central Coast Mariners	Sydney
19:00 AEDT	De Silva 11'	Report	Eames 53'	Stadium: Campbelltown Sports Stadium; Attendance: 4,448; Referee: Adam Kersey

27 December 2024 10	Perth Glory	0–3	Macarthur FC	Perth
18:45 AWST		Report	Drew 27', 33'; Piol 73'	Stadium: HBF Park; Attendance: 6,258; Referee: Jack Morgan

1 January 2025 11	Western Sydney Wanderers	2–3	Macarthur FC	Sydney
18:00 AEDT	Mata 23'; Pantazopoulos 55'	Report	Drew 13', 44'; Piol 26'	Stadium: CommBank Stadium; Attendance: 9,012; Referee: Casey Reibelt

6 January 2025 12	Macarthur FC	1–2	Adelaide United	Leumeah
19:00 AEDT	Germain 80'	Report	Clough 85' (pen.); Jovanovic 90+2'	Stadium: Campbelltown Sports Stadium; Attendance: 3,789; Referee: Tim Danaskos

12 January 2025 13	Newcastle Jets	1–3	Macarthur FC	Newcastle
17:00 AEDT	Gibson 18'	Report	Germain 23'; Drew 59'; Bernardo 90+1'	Stadium: McDonald Jones Stadium; Attendance: 6,152; Referee: Shaun Evans

20 January 2025 15	Macarthur FC	1–2	Wellington Phoenix	Sydney
19:00 AEDT	Hollman 16'	Report	Nagasawa 65'; Barbarouses 71' (pen.)	Stadium: Campbelltown Sports Stadium; Attendance: 3,456; Referee: Adam Kersey

25 January 2025 16	Macarthur FC	1–0	Melbourne City	Sydney
19:35 AEDT	Germain 62'	Report		Stadium: Campbelltown Sports Stadium; Attendance: 3,843; Referee: Alex King

1 February 2025 17	Auckland FC	2–1	Macarthur FC	Auckland
17:00 NZDT	Moreno 9'; Verstraete 80'	Report	Hollman 90+5'	Stadium: Go Media Stadium; Attendance: 14,051; Referee: Lachlan Keevers

9 February 2025 18	Macarthur FC	2–2	Western United	Sydney
17:00 AEDT	Hollman 32'; Jakoliš 79'	Report	Botic 23'; Walatee 45+4'	Stadium: Campbelltown Sports Stadium; Attendance: 3,627; Referee: Casey Reibelt

16 February 2025 19	Western Sydney Wanderers	2–1	Macarthur FC	Sydney
17:00 AEDT	Milanovic 69'; Cleur 77'	Report	Pantazopoulos 56' (o.g.)	Stadium: CommBank Stadium; Attendance: 9,243; Referee: Alireza Faghani

1 March 2025 21	Macarthur FC	0–2	Sydney FC	Sydney
19:35 AEDT		Report	Klimala 68'; Segecic 73'	Stadium: Campbelltown Sports Stadium; Attendance: 8,002; Referee: Adam Kersey

7 March 2025 22	Melbourne City	2–0	Macarthur FC	Melbourne
19:35 AEDT	Caputo 33', 74' (pen.)	Report		Stadium: AAMI Park; Attendance: 3,569; Referee: Ben Abraham

14 March 2025 23	Adelaide United	4–5	Macarthur FC	Adelaide
19:05 ACDT	Ayoubi 13'; Kitto 19'; Mauk 42'; Goodwin 73'	Report	Ikonomidis 8'; Adamson 10'; Brattan 53', 83'; Jakoliš 58'	Stadium: Coopers Stadium; Attendance: 6,125; Referee: Tim Danaskos

28 March 2025 24	Macarthur FC	3–3	Newcastle Jets	Sydney
19:35 AEDT	Sawyer 65', 90+5'; Uskok 82'	Report	Rose 2'; Adams 7', 71'	Stadium: Campbelltown Sports Stadium; Attendance: 4,678; Referee: Alex King

4 April 2025 25	Brisbane Roar	1–5	Macarthur FC	Brisbane
18:35 AEST	Abubakar 28'	Report	Jakoliš 44', 55', 73'; Hollman 68'; Sawyer 90'	Stadium: Suncorp Stadium; Attendance: 3,899; Referee: Shaun Evans

20 April 2025 27	Central Coast Mariners	2–2	Macarthur FC	Gosford
17:00 AEST	Sainsbury 15'; De Lima 29'	Report	Boli 22'; Sawyer 49'	Stadium: Industree Group Stadium; Attendance: 4,481; Referee: Alex King

25 April 2025 28	Macarthur FC	1–2	Melbourne Victory	Sydney
19:35 AEST	Ikonomidis 68'	Report	Teague 4'; Bos 36'	Stadium: Campbelltown Sports Stadium; Attendance: 3,763; Referee: Daniel Elder

3 May 2025 29	Macarthur FC	1–3	Western Sydney Wanderers	Sydney
19:35 AEST	Jakoliš 4'	Report	Kraev 21'; Pantazopoulos 55'; Antonsson 73'	Stadium: Campbelltown Stadium; Attendance: 9,213; Referee: Alex King

=== Australia Cup ===
30 July 2024 Round of 32	O'Connor Knights	1–2	Macarthur FC	Canberra
19:30 AEST	Manda 57'	Report	Hollman 62'; Brattan 79'	Stadium: GIO Stadium; Attendance: 3,210; Referee: Sam Kelly

25 August 2024 Round of 16	Newcastle Jets	3–4	Macarthur FC	Maitland
15:00 AEST	Grozos 14' (pen.); Natta 20'; Aquilina 68'	Report	Germain 48', 54'; Jakoliš 71', 75'	Stadium: Maitland Sportsground; Attendance: 2,971; Referee: Ben Abraham

14 September 2024 Quarter-finals	Oakleigh Cannons	0–1	Macarthur FC	Melbourne
15:00 AEST		Report	Germain 3'	Stadium: The Home of the Matildas; Attendance: 807; Referee: Jack Morgan

22 September 2024 Semi-finals	South Melbourne	0–1	Macarthur FC	Melbourne
18:00 AEST		Report	Germain 84' (pen.)	Stadium: Lakeside Stadium; Attendance: 4,138; Referee: Ben Abraham

29 September 2024 Final	Melbourne Victory	0–1	Macarthur FC	Melbourne
19:10 AEST		Report	Jakoliš 58'	Stadium: AAMI Park; Attendance: 13,289; Referee: Jonathan Barreiro

== Statistics ==
=== Appearances and goals ===
As of match played 3 May 2025

Includes all competitions. Players with no appearances not included in the list.

No.	Pos	Nat	Player	Total		A-League Men		Australia Cup	
No.	Pos	Nat	Player	Apps	Goals	Apps	Goals	Apps	Goals
5	DF	(Australia) AUS	Matthew Jurman	19	0	9+5	0	5+0	0
6	DF	(Australia) AUS	Tomislav Uskok	26	3	20+1	3	5+0	0
7	MF	(Australia) AUS	Daniel De Silva	20	2	4+14	2	2+0	0
8	MF	(Australia) AUS	Jake Hollman	28	6	22+3	5	2+1	1
9	FW	(Australia) AUS	Chris Ikonomidis	13	2	10+3	2	0+0	0
11	MF	(Australia) AUS	Peter Makrillos	7	0	0+7	0	0+0	0
12	GK	(Poland) POL	Filip Kurto	30	0	25+0	0	5+0	0
13	DF	(Australia) AUS	Ivan Vujica	29	0	20+4	0	5+0	0
17	MF	(Australia) AUS	Oliver Randazzo	6	0	0+4	0	1+1	0
18	DF	(Australia) AUS	Walter Scott	27	0	11+11	0	2+3	0
20	DF	(Australia) AUS	Kealey Adamson	30	2	25+1	2	3+1	0
21	FW	(Australia) AUS	Bernardo Oliveira	9	1	2+7	1	0+0	0
22	MF	(Australia) AUS	Liam Rose	23	0	12+8	0	3+0	0
23	MF	(Australia) AUS	Frans Deli	14	0	6+5	0	2+1	0
24	FW	(Australia) AUS	Dean Bosnjak	18	1	1+14	1	0+3	0
25	MF	(Australia) AUS	Flynn Madden	1	0	0+0	0	0+1	0
26	MF	(Australia) AUS	Luke Brattan	31	3	26+0	2	5+0	1
27	DF	(Australia) AUS	Joshua Damevski	7	0	1+3	0	1+2	0
28	FW	(Australia) AUS	Harry Sawyer	16	4	4+12	4	0+0	0
30	GK	(Australia) AUS	Alexander Robinson	1	0	1	0	0	0
33	DF	(Australia) AUS	Yianni Nicolaou	8	0	2+4	0	1+1	0
39	DF	(Ivory Coast) CIV	Kévin Boli	9	1	9	1	0	0
44	FW	(Croatia) CRO	Marin Jakoliš	31	13	25+1	10	5+0	3
95	MF	(Tunisia) TUN	Saif-Eddine Khaoui	5	0	2+3	0	0+0	0
Players who featured but departed the club permanently during the season:
11	FW	(Australia) AUS	Jed Drew	18	6	12+1	6	4+1	0
15	DF	(Belgium) BEL	Dino Arslanagić	9	0	8+1	0	0+0	0
16	DF	(Australia) AUS	Oliver Jones	11	0	8+0	0	0+3	0
19	FW	(Australia) AUS	Ariath Piol	11	3	4+5	3	0+2	0
98	FW	(France) FRA	Valère Germain	21	11	17+0	7	4+0	4

=== Disciplinary record ===
Includes all competitions. The list is sorted by squad number when total cards are equal. Players with no cards not included in the list.

As of match played 25 April 2025

Rank	No.	Pos.	Nat.	Name	A-League Men			Australia Cup			Total		
Rank	No.	Pos.	Nat.	Name	Yellow card	(yellow card) (yellow-red card)	Red card	Yellow card	(yellow card) (yellow-red card)	Red card	Yellow card	(yellow card) (yellow-red card)	Red card
1	6	DF	(Australia)	Tomislav Uskok	4	0	1	1	0	0	5	0	1
2	26	MF	(Australia)	Luke Brattan	7	0	0	0	0	0	7	0	0
2	44	FW	(Croatia)	Marin Jakoliš	5	0	0	2	0	0	7	0	0
4	8	MF	(Australia)	Jake Hollman	4	0	0	1	0	0	5	0	0
4	22	MF	(Australia)	Liam Rose	4	0	0	1	0	0	5	0	0
6	13	DF	(Australia)	Ivan Vujica	2	0	0	1	0	0	3	0	0
6	18	DF	(Australia)	Walter Scott	3	0	0	0	0	0	3	0	0
8	5	DF	(Australia)	Matthew Jurman	1	0	0	1	0	0	2	0	0
8	11	MF	(Australia)	Peter Makrillos	2	0	0	0	0	0	2	0	0
8	23	MF	(Australia)	Frans Deli	2	0	0	0	0	0	2	0	0
11	7	MF	(Australia)	Daniel De Silva	1	0	0	0	0	0	1	0	0
11	12	GK	(Poland)	Filip Kurto	1	0	0	0	0	0	1	0	0
11	17	MF	(Australia)	Oliver Randazzo	1	0	0	0	0	0	1	0	0
11	20	DF	(Australia)	Kealey Adamson	1	0	0	0	0	0	1	0	0
11	24	FW	(Australia)	Dean Bosnjak	1	0	0	0	0	0	1	0	0
11	39	DF	(Ivory Coast)	Kévin Boli	1	0	0	0	0	0	1	0	0
Player(s) transferred out but featured this season
1	98	FW	(France)	Valère Germain	2	0	0	1	1	0	3	1	0
2	15	DF	(Belgium)	Dino Arslanagić	3	0	0	0	0	0	3	0	0
3	16	DF	(Australia)	Oliver Jones	1	0	0	1	0	0	2	0	0
4	11	FW	(Australia)	Jed Drew	1	0	0	0	0	0	1	0	0
4	19	FW	(Australia)	Ariath Piol	1	0	0	0	0	0	1	0	0
Total					48	0	1	9	1	0	57	1	1

=== Clean sheets ===
Includes all competitions. The list is sorted by squad number when total clean sheets are equal. Numbers in parentheses represent games where both goalkeepers participated and both kept a clean sheet; the number in parentheses is awarded to the goalkeeper who was substituted on, whilst a full clean sheet is awarded to the goalkeeper who was on the field at the start of play. Goalkeepers with no clean sheets not included in the list.

As of match played 3 May 2025

Rank	No.	Nat.	Goalkeeper	A-League Men	Australia Cup	Total
1	12	(Poland)	Filip Kurto	3	3	6
Total				3	3	6
