= List of Macarthur FC seasons =

Macarthur Football Club is an Australian professional association football club based in Macarthur, Sydney. The club was formed in 2017 as Macarthur South West United before it was shortly renamed to Macarthur FC in 2019. They were admitted into the A-League Men in 2020, having spent the 2018–19 season playing their one friendly game.

== History ==
When the Macarthur FC bid for the A-League Men was founded in 2017 as Macarthur South West United, they played their first match against Central Coast Mariners in October 2018. Two months later, they successfully won the bid for the expansion for 2019–20 A-League season. Their inaugural season had the team finish 6th to finish in the semi-finals.

== Key ==
Key to league competitions:

- A-League Men (A-League) – Australia's top football league, established in 2005.

Key to colours and symbols:

1st or W	Winners
2nd or RU	Runners-up
3rd	Third place
♦	Top scorer in division

Key to league record:

- Season = The year and article of the season
- Pos = Final position
- Pld = Matches played
- W = Matches won
- D = Matches drawn
- L = Matches lost
- GF = Goals scored
- GA = Goals against
- Pts = Points

Key to cup record:

- En-dash (–) = Macarthur FC did not participate or cup not held
- R1 = First round
- R2 = Second round, etc.
- QF = Quarter-finals
- SF = Semi-finals
- RU = Runners-up
- W = Winners

== Seasons ==
Results of league and cup competitions by season
Season	Pld	W	D	L	GF	GA	Pts	Pos	Finals	Australia Cup	Competition	Result	Name(s)	Goals
Season	A-League Men								Finals	Australia Cup	Asia		Top goalscorer(s)	
2020–21	26	11	6	9	33	36	39	6th	SF	—	—	—	Matt Derbyshire	14
2021–22	26	9	6	11	38	47	33	7th	—	R16	—	—	Ulises Davila	7
2022–23	26	7	5	14	31	48	26	12th	—	W	—	—	Al Hassan Toure	8
2023–24	27	11	8	8	45	48	41	5th	EF	R32	AFC Cup	Zonal Final	Valère Germain	16
2024–25	0	0	0	0	0	0	0	TBD	—	W	—	—	TBD	—
