= 2024 Australia Cup final =

Melbourne Victory and Macarthur FC Cup soccer match 2024

- Event: 2024 Australia Cup
Melbourne Victory	Macarthur FC
0	1
- Date: 29 September 2024
- Venue: AAMI Park, Melbourne
- Man of the Match: Filip Kurto (Macarthur FC)
- Referee: Jonathan Barreiro
- Attendance: 13,289

The 2024 Australia Cup final was a soccer match played between A-League Men sides Melbourne Victory and Macarthur FC at AAMI Park in Melbourne on 29 September 2024 to determine the winners of the 2024 Australia Cup. It was the ninth Australia Cup final and the 42nd final of Australian soccer's primary cup competitions. It was the first FFA Cup/Australia Cup final to be played in September.

== Route to the final ==
Melbourne Victory		Round	Macarthur FC	
Opponent	Score		Opponent	Score
Lambton Jaffas	4–1 (A)	Round of 32	O'Connor Knights	2–1 (A)
NWS Spirit	4–0 (A)	Round of 16	Newcastle Jets	4–3 (A)
Moreton City Excelsior	4–0 (A)	Quarter-finals	Oakleigh Cannons	1–0 (A)
Adelaide United	1–0 (H)	Semi-finals	South Melbourne	1–0 (A)
Note: In all results above, the score of the finalist is given first (H: home; A: away).

=== Melbourne Victory ===
Melbourne Victory began their Australia Cup run in the Round of 32 with an away match against the Lambon Jaffas. Victory won the match 4–1 through two goals by Nishan Velupillay and one each by Bruno Fornaroli and Alex Lee and qualifying for the Round of 16. Two weeks later, Victory began their Round of 16 match away against NWS Spirit winning 4–0 through another two goals by Nishan Velupillay, and further goals by Ryan Teague and Nikos Vergos. The quarter-final match away against Moreton City Excelsior saw Victory win 4–0; so far all three cup matches scoring four goals, as Nikos Vergos scored two goals, and Kasey Bos and Nishan Velupillay each scoring one. The semi-final against Adelaide United was Victory's first home tie in this Australia Cup run, which was won 1–0 through a late winner by Jordi Valadon.

=== Macarthur FC ===
Macarthur FC also began their Australia Cup run in the Round of 32 playing away against O'Connor Knights; despite conceding the opening goal, came back to win 2–1 through goals by Jake Hollman and Luke Brattan to qualify for the Round of 16. Macarthur versed A-League Men side away against the Newcastle Jets which was won 4–3 after falling behind twice as Valère Germain and Marin Jakoliš both scored two goals. Macarthur travelled to Melbourne for their quarter-final and semi-final match-ups. First Macarthur took on Oakleigh Cannons away and won 1–0 through an early goal by Valère Germain. The semi-final was up against South Melbourne away and also won 1–0 through a Valère Germain penalty in the 84th minute who was also sent off in the last minutes of the match.

== Match ==
=== Details ===
29 September 2024
19:10 AEST

Melbourne Victory (1)	0–1	Macarthur FC (1)
	Report	Jakoliš 58'

AAMI Park, Melbourne
Attendance: 13,289
Referee: Jonathan Barreiro

Melbourne Victory	Macarthur FC

GK	25	(Australia) Jack Duncan
RB	2	(Australia) Jason Geria
CB	5	(Australia) Brendan Hamill
CB	21	(Portugal) Roderick Miranda
LB	28	(Australia) Kasey Bos
CM	14	(Australia) Jordi Valadon
CM	8	(France) Zinédine Machach	(substituted off) 79'
CM	6	(Australia) Ryan Teague
RW	27	(Australia) Reno Piscopo	(substituted off) 66'
CF	9	(Greece) Nikos Vergos	(substituted off) 66'
LW	17	(Australia) Nishan Velupillay
Substitutes:
GK	40	(Australia) Christian Siciliano
DF	3	(Ivory Coast) Adama Traoré
DF	22	(Australia) Joshua Rawlins
MF	18	(Australia) Fabian Monge
FW	10	(Australia) Bruno Fornaroli	(substituted on) 66'
FW	19	(Australia) Jing Reec	(substituted on) 66'
FW	35	(Australia) Jordan Hoey	(substituted on) 79'
Head Coach:
(Australia) Patrick Kisnorbo

GK	12	(Poland) Filip Kurto
CB	6	(Australia) Tomislav Uskok
CB	5	(Australia) Matthew Jurman
CB	13	(Australia) Ivan Vujica
RM	20	(Australia) Kealey Adamson
CM	26	(Australia) Luke Brattan
CM	22	(Australia) Liam Rose
LM	18	(Australia) Walter Scott
RW	8	(Australia) Jake Hollman	(yellow card) 65'	(substituted off) 73'
CF	11	(Australia) Jed Drew		(substituted off) 80'
LW	44	(Croatia) Marin Jakoliš	(yellow card) 55'	(substituted off) 90+5'
Substitutes:
GK	40	(Australia) Franklin Jan
DF	16	(Australia) Oliver Jones	(substituted on) 90+5'
DF	27	(Australia) Joshua Damevski
DF	33	(Australia) Yianni Nicolaou
MF	28	(Australia) Ante Vojvodic
FW	19	(Australia) Ariath Piol	(substituted on) 80'
FW	24	(Australia) Dean Bosnjak	(substituted on) 73'
Head Coach:
(Australia) Mile Sterjovski

Assistant referees:
Ashley Beecham
Arvin Shanmuganathan
Fourth official:
Jack Morgan

Match rules

- 90 minutes
- 30 minutes of extra time if necessary
- Penalty shoot-out if scores still level
- Seven named substitutes

== Post-match ==
Melbourne Victory manager Patrick Kisnorbo stated he omitted star player Daniel Arzani from both the starting lineup and the substitute bench due to experimentation with the squad as a result of Arzani's eventual suspension from the first match of the regular season for yellow card accumulation. Arzani played a key role in leading Victory to the final, having played in all four matches leading up to the final and contributing two assists in the quarter-final match against Moreton City Excelsior. After the loss in the final, Kisnorbo stated he stood by his decision. However, it was also reported a day after the match that the main reason Arzani was excluded from the matchday squad for the final was rumored to be for the anger he expressed towards Kisnorbo at training during the week, with speculation variously suggesting this was due to him discovering he wouldn't be in the starting team, while also being reported it was due to him being offered to other clubs during the offseason. Days following the final, Arzani was included in Tony Popovic's inaugural Australia squad for World Cup qualifiers against China and Japan, but was not named in the matchday squad against China and was an unused substitute against Japan. After returning to Melbourne from international duty, Arzani was replaced in Victory's starting lineup by Kisnorbo for Reno Piscopo in the ensuing matches, and was not called up by Popovic for the next set of World Cup qualifying matches in November.

Macarthur's Australia Cup triumph was their second silverware in club history following their 2022 Australia Cup win.
