= 2021–22 Macarthur FC season =

Macarthur FC
2021–22 season
- Chairman: Rabieh Krayem
- Manager: Ante Milicic
- Stadium: Campbelltown Stadium
- A-League Men: 7th
- FFA Cup: Round of 16
- Top goalscorer: League: Ulises Davila (7); All: Ulises Davila (7)
- Highest home attendance: 5,203 (12 March 2022 vs. Western Sydney Wanderers
- Lowest home attendance: 1,188 (21 November 2021 vs. Wellington Phoenix
- Average home league attendance: 3,023
Home colours	Away colours	Third colours

The 2021–22 season will be Macarthur FC's second season since its establishment in 2017. The club will competing in the A-League for the second time and in the FFA Cup for the first time.

== Players ==
Note: Flags indicate national team as defined under FIFA eligibility rules; some limited exceptions apply. Players may hold more than one non-FIFA nationality.

No.	Pos.	Nation	Player
1	GK	AUS	Nicholas Suman
2	DF	AUS	Jake McGing
3	DF	AUS	Antony Golec
4	DF	AUS	James Meredith
6	DF	AUS	Aleksandar Jovanovic
7	MF	AUS	Daniel De Silva
8	MF	ENG	Jordon Mutch
9	FW	AUS	Tomi Juric
10	MF	MEX	Ulises Dávila (captain)
11	MF	AUS	Tommy Oar
12	GK	POL	Filip Kurto
14	FW	AUS	Moudi Najjar

No.	Pos.	Nation	Player
15	DF	AUS	Aleksandar Šušnjar
17	FW	ENG	Craig Noone
19	MF	AUS	Michael Ruhs
20	DF	AUS	Tomislav Uskok
21	MF	AUS	Jake Hollman
22	MF	AUS	Liam Rose
23	DF	JAM	Adrian Mariappa
24	MF	AUS	Charles M'Mombwa
31	MF	AUS	Lachlan Rose
35	FW	AUS	Al Hassan Toure
99	FW	AUS	Apostolos Giannou

== Transfers ==
=== Transfers in ===
No.	Position	Player	Transferred from	Type/fee	Contract length	Date	Ref
10	MF	(Mexico) Ulises Dávila	Wellington Phoenix	Free transfer	3 years	17 May 2021	
17	FW	(England) Craig Noone	Melbourne City	Free transfer	2 years	14 June 2021	
7	MF	Daniel De Silva	Central Coast Mariners	Free transfer	2 years	23 June 2021	
20	DF	Tomislav Uskok	Unattached	Free transfer	2 years	11 July 2021	
9	FW	Tomi Juric	Adelaide United	Free transfer	1 year	14 July 2021	
8	MF	(England) Jordon Mutch	Western Sydney Wanderers	Free transfer	1 year	23 July 2021	
35	FW	Al Hassan Toure	Adelaide United	Free transfer	1 year	13 October 2021	
12	GK	(Poland) Filip Kurto	Unattached	Free transfer	1 year	26 October 2021	
23	DF	(Jamaica) Adrian Mariappa	Unattached	Free transfer	1 year	29 November 2021	
99	FW	Apostolos Giannou	Unattached	Free transfer	5 months	14 January 2022	

=== Transfers out ===
No.	Position	Player	Transferred to	Type/fee	Date	Ref
5	MF	Mark Milligan	Retired		2 June 2021	
7	DF	Ivan Franjic	Unattached	End of contract	25 June 2021	
9	FW	Milislav Popovic	Unattached	End of contract	25 June 2021	
10	MF	(France) Loïc Puyo	Unattached	End of contract	25 June 2021	
13	DF	Yianni Nicolaou	Unattached	End of contract	25 June 2021	
17	FW	Kyle Cimenti	Unattached	End of contract	25 June 2021	
23	DF	Walter Scott	Unattached	End of contract	25 June 2021	
4	MF	(Spain) Beñat	Retired		29 June 2021	
33	MF	(Spain) Markel Susaeta	Retired		29 June 2021	
27	FW	(England) Matt Derbyshire	(Cyprus) AEK Larnaca	Undisclosed	10 July 2021	
8	MF	Denis Genreau	(France) Toulouse	Undisclosed	31 July 2021	
1	GK	Adam Federici	Retired		23 October 2021	
29	MF	(Cyprus) Antonis Martis	(Denmark) Midtjylland	End of loan	8 January 2022	

=== Contracts extensions ===
No.	Name	Position	Duration	Date	Notes
24	Charles M'Mombwa	Attacking midfielder	1 year	5 July 2021	
14	Moudi Najjar	Winger	2 years	6 July 2021	permanent contract following loan
19	Michael Ruhs	Winger	1 year	13 July 2021	
12	James Meredith	Left-back	1 year	21 July 2021	
29	(Cyprus) Antonis Martis	Midfielder	1 year	4 August 2021	loan extension
22	Liam Rose	Defensive midfielder	1 year	6 August 2021	

== Pre-season and friendlies ==
16 October 2021	Sydney FC	5–0	Macarthur FC	Sydney, Australia
	Bobô 2', 19'; Kamsoba 55'; Le Fondre 71', 75'	Report		Stadium: Sydney FC training ground Referee: Sam Kelly

26 October 2021	Central Coast Mariners	3–1	Macarthur FC	Tuggerah, Australia
	Tongyik 20'; Ureña (?); Simon (?)	Report	La. Rose (?)	Stadium: Central Coast Mariners Centre of Excellence; Attendance: 0 (behind closed doors)

30 October 2021	Western Sydney Wanderers	3–2	Macarthur FC
19:00	Ibini 17'; Hemed 36'; Russell 71'	Report	Dávila 18'; Meredith 48'	Attendance: 0 (behind closed doors)

6 November 2021	Macarthur FC	3–6	Newcastle Jets	Sydney, Australia
	?; ?; ?	Report	Mikeltadze; Silvera; Siatravanis; Penha; Yuel; Petratos	Stadium: Fairfield Showground; Attendance: 0 (behind closed doors)
Note: The teams played an extra 30 minutes following full-time

== Competitions ==
Win Draw Loss Cancelled or postponed

=== A-League ===
==== League table ====
Pos	Team	Pld	W	D	L	GF	GA	GD	Pts	Qualification
5	Central Coast Mariners	26	12	6	8	49	35	+14	42	Qualification for finals series (Note: The top two teams enter the finals series at the semi-finals, while the teams ranked third to sixth enter the finals series at the elimination-finals.)
6	Wellington Phoenix (Note: Wellington Phoenix cannot qualify for Asian Football Confederation competitions as they are based in New Zealand, which is under the Oceania Football Confederation.)	26	12	3	11	34	49	−15	39	Qualification for finals series
7	Macarthur FC	26	9	6	11	38	47	−9	33	
8	Sydney FC	26	8	7	11	37	44	−7	31	
9	Newcastle Jets	26	8	5	13	45	43	+2	29	Qualification for 2022 Australia Cup play-offs (Note: The top 8 teams qualify for the round of 32, while the bottom four teams participate in a play-off round.)

Source: A-Leagues
Rules for classification: 1) Points; 2) Goal difference; 3) Goals scored; 4) Points per game; 5) Least red cards; 6) Least yellow cards; 7) Toss of a coin in an event of a tie of two clubs.

==== Matches ====
21 November 2021 1	Macarthur FC	1–1	Wellington Phoenix	Newcastle
18:45 AEDT	La. Rose 61'	Report	Hooper 25' (pen.)	Stadium: McDonald Jones Stadium; Attendance: 1,188; Referee: Ben Abraham

27 November 2021 2	Sydney FC	0–1	Macarthur FC	Sydney
19:45 AEDT		Report	La. Rose 17'	Stadium: Netstrata Jubilee Stadium; Attendance: 6,632; Referee: Stephen Lucas

5 December 2021 3	Macarthur FC	1–0	Central Coast Mariners	Sydney
16:05 AEDT	Bozanic 45' (o.g.)	Report		Stadium: BlueBet Stadium; Attendance: 3,014; Referee: Ben Abraham

11 December 2021 4	Western Sydney Wanderers	0–2	Macarthur FC	Sydney
19:45 AEDT		Report	Uskok 64'; Hollman 74'	Stadium: CommBank Stadium; Attendance: 8,910; Referee: Chris Beath

19 December 2021 5	Macarthur FC	2–1	Newcastle Jets	Campbelltown
16:05 AEDT	De Silva 48'; Meredith 84'	Report	Mikeltadze 35'	Stadium: Campbelltown Stadium; Attendance: 2,691; Referee: Alex King

26 December 2021 6	Macarthur FC	0–3	Sydney FC	Campbelltown
19:45 AEDT		Report	Wood 11'; Burgess 28'; Buhagiar 58'	Stadium: Campbelltown Stadium; Attendance: 4,843; Referee: Kurt Ams

1 February 2022 10	Macarthur FC	2–2	Western United	Campbelltown
19:45 AEDT	La. Rose 77'; Lacroix 88'	Report	Milanovic 16'; Prijović 74'	Stadium: Campbelltown Stadium; Attendance: 2,002; Referee: Tim Danaskos

6 February 2022 13	Wellington Phoenix	3–1	Macarthur FC	Campbelltown
16:05 AEDT	Piscopo 12' (pen.); Sotirio 71', 78'	Report	Dávila 58'	Stadium: Campbelltown Stadium; Attendance: 2,328; Referee: Alex King

10 February 2022 7	Central Coast Mariners	3–3	Macarthur FC	Gosford
19:45 AEDT	Šušnjar 39' (o.g.); Bozanic 76' (pen.); Moresche 86' (pen.)	Report	Oar 25'; Mariappa 33'; Noone 90'	Stadium: Central Coast Stadium; Attendance: 2,732; Referee: Lachlan Keevers

13 February 2022 14	Brisbane Roar	3–1	Macarthur FC	Kippa-Ring
18:45 AEDT	Mileusnic 2'; Brown 60'; Hore 78'	Report	Mariappa 74'	Stadium: Moreton Daily Stadium; Attendance: 4,691; Referee: Kurt Ams

19 February 2022 15	Macarthur FC	4–1	Adelaide United	Campbelltown
19:45 AEDT	Giannou 43'; Noone 67'; A. Toure 73'; Ruhs 90+1'	Report	Goodwin 20'	Stadium: Campbelltown Stadium; Attendance: 2,702; Referee: Alireza Faghani

23 February 2022 12	Perth Glory	0–1	Macarthur FC	Launceston
19:55 AEDT		Report	Dávila 9'	Stadium: University of Tasmania Stadium; Attendance: 723; Referee: Kurt Ams

26 February 2022 16	Newcastle Jets	2–2	Macarthur FC	Newcastle
17:05 AEDT	Mikeltadze 33' (pen.); Li. Rose 79' (o.g.)	Report	Uskok 21'; Oar 60'	Stadium: McDonald Jones Stadium; Attendance: 5,236; Referee: Adam Kersey

4 March 2022 17	Melbourne Victory	3–1	Macarthur FC	Melbourne
19:45 AEDT	D'Agostino 20', 45'; Rojas 58'	Report	Giannou 90'	Stadium: AAMI Park; Attendance: 7,011; Referee: Kurt Ams

9 March 2022 9	Melbourne City	3–1	Macarthur FC	Melbourne
19:05 AEDT	Mariappa 28' (o.g.); Berenguer 44'; Maclaren 54' (pen.)	Report	Giannou 15'	Stadium: AAMI Park; Attendance: 2,716; Referee: Jonathan Barreiro

12 March 2022 18	Macarthur FC	3–1	Western Sydney Wanderers	Campbelltown
19:45 AEDT	Noone 8'; Dávila 73', 90' (pen.)	Report	Antonis 80'	Stadium: Campbelltown Stadium; Attendance: 5,203; Referee: Adam Kersey

19 March 2022 19	Central Coast Mariners	4–2	Macarthur FC	Mudgee
17:05 AEDT	Ureña 27', 80'; Hatch 48'; Smith 57'	Report	Mariappa 46'; La. Rose 88'	Stadium: Glen Willow Sporting Field; Attendance: 1,057; Referee: Ben Abraham

26 March 2022 20	Macarthur FC	0–1	Melbourne City	Campbelltown
19:45 AEDT		Report	Maclaren 64'	Stadium: Campbelltown Stadium; Attendance: 2,713; Referee: Alex King

30 March 2022 21	Sydney FC	2–2	Macarthur FC	Sydney
19:05 AEDT	Buhagiar 39'; Šušnjar 53' (o.g.)	Report	Dávila 8' (pen.); Šušnjar 26'	Stadium: Netstrata Jubilee Stadium; Attendance: 1,759; Referee: Chris Beath

3 April 2022 8	Macarthur FC	4–2	Perth Glory	Campbelltown
18:20 AEST	Dávila 38' (pen.); Noone 54' (pen.); Toure 82'; Najjar 90+6'	Report	Colli 1'; Ostler 18'	Stadium: Campbelltown Stadium; Attendance: 2,357; Referee: Jonathon Barreiro

8 April 2022 23	Adelaide United	1–0	Macarthur FC	Adelaide
19:45 AEST	Ibusuki 45+1'	Report		Stadium: Coopers Stadium; Attendance: 5,166; Referee: Alireza Faghani

15 April 2022 24	Macarthur FC	2–1	Brisbane Roar	Campbelltown
19:45 AEST	Dávila 44'; McGing 89'	Report	Neville 78'	Stadium: Campbelltown Stadium; Attendance: 2,809; Referee: Daniel Elder

19 April 2022 22	Western United	2–0	Macarthur FC	Launceston
17:05 AEST	Pain 57'; Prijović 90+4'	Report		Stadium: University of Tasmania Stadium; Attendance: 1,569; Referee: Alex King

23 April 2022 25	Macarthur FC	1–4	Melbourne Victory	Campbelltown
17:05 AEST	Noone 56' (pen.)	Report	Folami 28'; Brimmer 53' (pen.); Miranda 81'; Brillante 90+4'	Stadium: Campbelltown Stadium; Attendance: 3,188; Referee: Daniel Elder

1 May 2022 26	Macarthur FC	0–3	Newcastle Jets	Campbelltown
16:05 AEST		Report	Siatravanis 4'; Yuel 66'; Mikeltadze 73'	Stadium: Campbelltown Stadium; Attendance: 3,567; Referee: Adam Kersey

8 May 2022 11	Macarthur FC	1–1	Western Sydney Wanderers	Campbelltown
16:05 AEST	Juric 55' (pen.)	Report	Carluccio 10'	Stadium: Campbelltown Stadium; Referee: Casey Reibelt

=== FFA Cup ===
13 November 2021 Round of 32	Newcastle Olympic (New South Wales)	0–3	Macarthur FC	Newcastle
18:00 AEDT		Report	Jovanovic 39'; La. Rose 41', 61'	Stadium: No.2 Sportsground; Attendance: 1,482; Referee: Ivica Covic

8 December 2021 Round of 16	Sydney FC	2–0 (a.e.t.)	Macarthur FC	Sydney
20:00 AEDT	Donachie 100'; Van Der Saag 119'	Report		Stadium: Netstrata Jubilee Stadium; Attendance: 1,201; Referee: Kurt Ams
