= 2022–23 Macarthur FC season =

Macarthur FC
2022–23 season
- Manager: Dwight Yorke (to 21 January 2023); Mile Sterjovski (from 23 January 2023)
- Stadium: Campbelltown Stadium
- A-League Men: 12th
- A-League Men Finals: DNQ
- Australia Cup: Winners
- Top goalscorer: League: Bachana Arabuli; Matthew Millar (5); All: Al Hassan Toure (8)
- Highest home attendance: 7,534 vs. Western Sydney Wanderers (8 April 2023); A-League Men
- Lowest home attendance: 1,521 vs. Wellington Phoenix (31 August 2022); Australia Cup
- Average home league attendance: 3,514
- Biggest win: 3–0 vs. Sydney FC (A) (24 December 2022); A-League Men
- Biggest defeat: 1–6 vs. Melbourne City (A) (4 February 2023); A-League Men
Home colours	Away colours
- All statistics correct as of 29 April 2023.

The 2022–23 season was the third in the history of Macarthur Football Club since its establishment in 2017. The club competed in the A-League Men for the third time and in the Australia Cup for the second time.

== Players ==
Note: Flags indicate national team as defined under FIFA eligibility rules; some limited exceptions apply. Players may hold more than one non-FIFA nationality.

No.	Pos.	Nation	Player
1	GK	AUS	Nicholas Suman
2	DF	AUS	Jake McGing
5	DF	AUS	Jonathan Aspropotamitis
6	DF	AUS	Tomislav Uskok
7	MF	AUS	Daniel De Silva
8	MF	AUS	Jake Hollman
9	FW	GEO	Bachana Arabuli
10	MF	MEX	Ulises Dávila (captain)
11	MF	AUS	Kearyn Baccus
12	GK	POL	Filip Kurto
13	DF	AUS	Ivan Vujica
14	FW	AUS	Moudi Najjar
15	DF	AUS	Aleksandar Šušnjar
17	MF	ENG	Craig Noone

No.	Pos.	Nation	Player
20	FW	USA	Jason Romero (Injury replacement)
22	MF	AUS	Edward Caspers (scholarship)
24	MF	AUS	Charles M'Mombwa
27	MF	AUS	Jerry Skotadis
30	GK	AUS	Alexander Robinson (scholarship)
31	MF	AUS	Lachlan Rose
32	DF	AUS	Isaac Hovar (scholarship)
35	FW	AUS	Al Hassan Toure
36	FW	AUS	Ali Auglah (scholarship)
37	FW	AUS	Jed Drew
41	MF	AUS	Oliver Jones
44	DF	AUS	Matthew Millar
99	FW	AUS	Daniel Arzani

== Transfers ==
=== Transfers in ===
No.	Position	Player	Transferred from	Type/fee	Contract length	Date	Ref
–	DF	Lewis Miller	Central Coast Mariners	Free transfer	2 years	14 April 2022	
37	MF	Jed Drew	(Australia) Northbridge Bulls	Free transfer	1 year (scholarship)	15 June 2022	
22	MF	Eddie Caspers	(Australia) Northbridge Bulls	Free transfer	1 year (scholarship)	17 June 2022	
27	MF	Jerry Skotadis	Unattached	Free transfer	1 year	4 July 2022	
5	DF	Jonathan Aspropotamitis	Unattached	Free transfer	1 year	5 July 2022	
30	GK	Alexander Robinson	(Australia) Blacktown City	Free transfer	2 years (scholarship)	5 July 2022	
11	MF	Kearyn Baccus	Unattached	Free transfer	2 years	6 July 2022	
94	FW	Anthony Carter	(Thailand) Bangkok United	Free transfer		7 July 2022	
44	DF	Matthew Millar	(Scotland) St Mirren	Free transfer	1 year	7 July 2022	
13	DF	Ivan Vujica	Unattached	Free transfer	1 year	8 July 2022	
99	MF	Daniel Arzani	(England) Manchester City	Undisclosed	2 years	26 July 2022	
9	FW	(Georgia (country)) Bachana Arabuli	Unattached	Free transfer	1 year	1 September 2022	
18	DF	(Barbados) Mario Williams	(Barbados) Weymouth Wales	Free transfer	1 year	16 September 2022	
32	DF	Isaac Hovar	(Australia) Northbridge Bulls	Free transfer	(scholarship)	9 November 2022	
41	MF	Oliver Jones	(Australia) Northbridge Bulls	Free transfer	1 year (scholarship)	9 November 2022	
20	FW	(United States) Jason Romero	(Australia) APIA Leichhardt	Injury replacement for Ulises Davila	4 months	24 February 2023	

==== From youth squad ====
N	Pos.	Nat.	Name	Age	Notes
36	FW	(Australia)	Ali Auglah	20	2-year scholarship contract

=== Transfers out ===
No.	Position	Player	Transferred to	Type/fee	Date	Ref.
22	MF	Liam Rose	(United States) El Paso Locomotive	Undisclosed	16 May 2022	
19	MF	Michael Ruhs	Central Coast Mariners	Free transfer	9 June 2022	
–	DF	Lewis Miller	(Scotland) Hibernian	Undisclosed	9 June 2022	
3	DF	Antony Golec	Unattached	End of contract	17 June 2022	
6	DF	Aleksandar Jovanovic	Unattached	End of contract	17 June 2022	
8	MF	(England) Jordon Mutch	Unattached	End of contract	17 June 2022	
9	FW	Tomi Juric	Unattached	End of contract	17 June 2022	
99	FW	Apostolos Giannou	Unattached	End of contract	17 June 2022	
11	MF	Tommy Oar	Retired		19 July 2022	
4	DF	James Meredith	Retired		20 July 2022	
23	DF	(Jamaica) Adrian Mariappa	Unattached	End of contract	30 August 2022	
18	DF	(Barbados) Mario Williams	Unattached	Mutual contract termination	2 December 2022	
94	FW	Anthony Carter	(Portugal) Oliveirense	Mutual contract termination	21 January 2023	

=== Contract extensions ===
No.	Name	Position	Duration	Date	Notes
2	Jake McGing	Right-back	2 years	21 June 2022	
24	Charles M'Mombwa	Attacking midfielder	2 years	23 June 2022	
12	(Poland) Filip Kurto	Goalkeeper	1 year	24 June 2022	
31	Lachlan Rose	Winger	2 years	18 January 2023	
8	Jake Hollman	Central midfielder	2 years	27 January 2023	
6	Tomislav Uskok	Central defender	2 years	1 February 2023	
37	Jed Drew	Winger	2 years	10 February 2023	promoted to full-time contract
41	Oliver Jones	Central defender	2 years	17 April 2023	promoted to full-time contract
12	(Poland) Filip Kurto	Goalkeeper	1 year	28 April 2023	

== Pre-season and friendlies ==
Win Draw Loss Cancelled or postponed Fixtures

23 July 2022	Central Coast Mariners	4–0	Macarthur FC	Gosford
	Ayongo ?'; Ruhs ?'; Nkololo ?'; (unknown) ?' (o.g.)	Report		Stadium: Central Coast Stadium; Attendance: 0 (behind closed doors)

6 September 2022	Western Sydney Wanderers	Cancelled	Macarthur FC	Sydney
		Source; Cancellation		Stadium: Wanderers Football Park

== Competitions ==
=== Overall record ===
Competition	First match	Last match	Starting round	Final position	Record							
Competition	First match	Last match	Starting round	Final position	Pld	W	D	L	GF	GA	GD	Win %
A-League Men	8 October 2022	30 April 2023	Matchday 1	12th	26	7	5	14	31	48	−17	26.92
Australia Cup	30 July 2022	1 October 2022	Round of 32	Winners	5	5	0	0	19	2	+17	100.00
Total					31	12	5	14	50	50	+0	38.71

Last updated: 29 April 2023
Source: Soccerway

=== A-League Men ===
==== Results summary ====
Overall								Home						Away					
Pld	W	D	L	GF	GA	GD	Pts	W	D	L	GF	GA	GD	W	D	L	GF	GA	GD
26	7	5	14	31	48	−17	26	5	3	5	18	16	+2	2	2	9	13	32	−19

Last updated: 23 April 2023.
Source: Ultimate A-League

==== Results by round ====
Round	1	2	3	4	5	6	7	8	9	10	11	12	13	14	15	16	17	18	19	20	21	22	23	24	25	26
Ground	A	H	A	H	A	A	H	H	A	A	H	H	A	H	A	H	H	A	H	A	H	A	H	A	A	H
Result	D	W	D	L	L	W	L	W	W	L	W	L	L	D	L	W	L	L	W	L	D	L	D	L	L	L
Position	7	3	4	5	10	4	7	4	3	5	4	5	6	6	9	8	8	8	8	9	9	10	11	11	12	12
Points	1	4	5	5	5	8	8	11	14	14	17	17	17	18	18	21	21	21	24	24	25	25	26	26	26	26

Updated to match(es) played on 23 April 2023. Source: Ultimate A-League
A = Away; H = Home; W = Win; D = Draw; L = Loss

==== League table ====
Pos	Team	Pld	W	D	L	GF	GA	GD	Pts	Qualification
8	Brisbane Roar	26	7	9	10	26	33	−7	30	
9	Perth Glory	26	7	8	11	36	46	−10	29	Qualification for 2023 Australia Cup play-offs
10	Newcastle Jets	26	8	5	13	30	45	−15	29	Qualification for 2023 Australia Cup play-offs
11	Melbourne Victory	26	8	4	14	29	34	−5	28	Qualification for 2023 Australia Cup play-offs
12	Macarthur FC	26	7	5	14	31	48	−17	26	Qualification for AFC Cup group stage and 2023 Australia Cup play-offs (Note: Qualified to the AFC Cup as the 2022 Australia Cup winners.)

Source: A-Leagues
Rules for classification: 1) Points; 2) Goal difference; 3) Goals scored; 4) Points per game; 5) Least red cards; 6) Least yellow cards; 7) Toss of a coin in an event of a tie of two clubs.

==== Matches ====
8 October 2022 1	Brisbane Roar	0–0	Macarthur FC	Brisbane
17:00 AEDT		Report		Stadium: Suncorp Stadium; Attendance: 8,521; Referee: Adam Kersey

16 October 2022 2	Macarthur FC	2–0	Adelaide United	Campbelltown
15:00 AEDT	Arzani 27'; Rose 57'	Report		Stadium: Campbelltown Stadium; Attendance: 3,213; Referee: Shaun Evans

21 October 2022 3	Western United	1–1	Macarthur FC	Melbourne
19:45 AEDT	Wales 71'	Report	Millar 24'	Stadium: AAMI Park; Attendance: 2,423; Referee: Kurt Ams

29 October 2022 4	Macarthur FC	2–3	Sydney FC	Campbelltown
19:45 AEDT	Millar 16'; Carter 87'	Report	Wood 14'; Mak 45+1'; Segecic 83'	Stadium: Campbelltown Stadium; Attendance: 7,021; Referee: Alex King

6 November 2022 5	Wellington Phoenix	4–1	Macarthur FC	Wellington
15:00 NZST	Old 45+3'; Lewis 65'; Waine 67'; Kraev 75'	Report	Rose 59'	Stadium: Sky Stadium; Attendance: 6,135; Referee: Casey Reibelt

13 November 2022 6	Central Coast Mariners	2–3	Macarthur FC	Gosford
15:00 AEDT	Kuol 65' (pen.), 72'	Report	Toure 14'; Aspropotamitis 48'; Drew 90+5'	Stadium: Central Coast Stadium; Attendance: 6,736; Referee: Daniel Elder

Mid-season break for 2022 FIFA World Cup

11 December 2022 7	Macarthur FC	0–1	Melbourne Victory	Campbelltown
17:00 AEDT		Report	Folami 83'	Stadium: Campbelltown Stadium; Attendance: 3,312; Referee: Jonathan Barreiro

18 December 2022 8	Macarthur FC	1–0	Perth Glory	Campbelltown
17:00 AEDT	Arabuli 71'	Report		Stadium: Campbelltown Stadium; Attendance: 2,826; Referee: Tim Danaskos

24 December 2022 9	Sydney FC	0–3	Macarthur FC	Sydney
17:00 AEDT		Report	Arabuli 45', 89'; Dávila 71'	Stadium: Allianz Stadium; Attendance: 9,714; Referee: Kurt Ams

1 January 2023 10	Western Sydney Wanderers	4–0	Macarthur FC	Sydney
17:00 AEDT	Ngbakoto 16'; Bozanic 18'; Borello 70'; Najjarine 88' (pen.)	Report		Stadium: CommBank Stadium; Attendance: 10,751; Referee: Lachlan Keevers

8 January 2023 11	Macarthur FC	2–0	Newcastle Jets	Campbelltown
15:00 AEDT	Toure 43'; Dávila 78'	Report		Stadium: Campbelltown Stadium; Attendance: 3,123; Referee: Adam Kersey

13 January 2023 12	Macarthur FC	1–2	Central Coast Mariners	Campbelltown
19:45 AEDT	Millar 57'	Report	Túlio 4'; Cummings 26'	Stadium: Campbelltown Stadium; Attendance: 4,621; Referee: Alireza Faghani

20 January 2023 13	Adelaide United	1–0	Macarthur FC	Adelaide
19:15 ACDT	Clough 6'	Report		Stadium: Coopers Stadium; Attendance: 8,826; Referee: Kurt Ams

28 January 2023 14	Macarthur FC	2–2	Western United	Campbelltown
17:00 AEDT	Millar 67'; Drew 81'	Report	Wales 60'; Milanovic 89'	Stadium: Campbelltown Stadium; Attendance: 2,898; Referee: Ben Abraham

4 February 2023 15	Melbourne City	6–1	Macarthur FC	Melbourne
15:00 AEDT	Maclaren 3', 88'; Van der Venne 33', 43', 77'; Nabbout 68'	Report	Najjar 72'	Stadium: AAMI Park; Attendance: 4,252; Referee: Jonathon Barreiro

12 February 2023 16	Macarthur FC	2–1	Wellington Phoenix	Campbelltown
17:00 AEDT	Dávila 33'; Najjar 49'	Report	Kraev 4'	Stadium: Campbelltown Stadium; Attendance: 2,543; Referee: Alireza Faghani

18 February 2023 17	Macarthur FC	0–1	Newcastle Jets	Campbelltown
17:00 AEDT		Report	Buhagiar 8'	Stadium: Campbelltown Stadium; Attendance: 2,223; Referee: Stephen Lucas

25 February 2023 18	Western Sydney Wanderers	4–0	Macarthur FC	Sydney
19:45 AEDT	Borrello 3'; Amalfitano 37'; Schneiderlin 56' (pen.); Nieuwenhof 61'	Report		Stadium: CommBank Stadium; Attendance: 7,051

5 March 2023 19	Macarthur FC	3–2	Brisbane Roar	Campbelltown
15:00 AEDT	Arabuli 14'; Millar 67'; McGing 90+5'	Report	O'Shea 78'; Lofthouse 80'	Stadium: Campbelltown Stadium; Attendance: 2,232; Referee: Adam Kersey

11 March 2023 20	Central Coast Mariners	4–1	Macarthur FC	Mudgee
19:45 AEDT	McGarry 30'; Cummings 47', 63' (pen.); Túlio 51'	Report	De Silva 11'	Stadium: Glen Willow Regional Sports Stadium; Attendance: 1,408; Referee: Shaun Evans

19 March 2023 21	Macarthur FC	1–1	Melbourne City	Campbelltown
15:00 AEDT	Romero 26'	Report	Aspropotamitis 66' (o.g.)	Stadium: Campbelltown Stadium; Attendance: 2,121; Referee: Chris Beath

1 April 2023 22	Perth Glory	2–1	Macarthur FC	Perth
19:00 AWST	Taggart 69'; Beevers 74'	Report	Rose 43'	Stadium: Macedonia Park; Attendance: 3,896; Referee: Daniel Cook

8 April 2023 23	Macarthur FC	2–2	Western Sydney Wanderers	Campbelltown
19:45 AEST	Rose 66'; Toure 90+1'	Report	Borrello 42', 90+5'	Stadium: Campbelltown Stadium; Attendance: 7,534; Referee: Ben Abraham

14 April 2023 24	Newcastle Jets	2–1	Macarthur FC	Newcastle
19:45 AEST	Jurman 79'; O'Neill 90+5'	Report	Arabuli 90+2'	Stadium: McDonald Jones Stadium; Attendance: 4,380; Referee: Lachlan Keevers

23 April 2023 25	Melbourne Victory	2–1	Macarthur FC	Melbourne
15:00 AEST	Romero 3'; Brooks 90+4'	Report	Uskok 66'	Stadium: AAMI Park; Attendance: 6,012; Referee: Alireza Faghani

30 April 2023 26	Macarthur FC	0–1	Wellington Phoenix	Campbelltown
17:00 AEST		Report	Zawada 11'	Stadium: Campbelltown Stadium; Attendance: 2,017; Referee: Adam Kersey

=== Australia Cup ===
30 July 2022 Round of 32	Magpies Crusaders United	0–6	Macarthur FC	Mackay
17:30 AEST		Report	Carter 2'; Aspropotamitis 53'; De Silva 56'; Arzani 77' (pen.); Toure 79', 90'	Stadium: BB Print Stadium; Attendance: 1,141; Referee: Adam Kersey

10 August 2022 Round of 16	Modbury Jets	0–4	Macarthur FC	Adelaide
19:00 ACST		Report	Toure 9'; Rose 45+2', 90'; M'Mombwa 63'	Stadium: ServiceFM Stadium; Attendance: 1,080; Referee: Jack Morgan

31 August 2022 Quarter-final	Macarthur FC	2–0	Wellington Phoenix	Campbelltown
19:30 AEST	Toure 41'; Rose 88'	Report		Stadium: Campbelltown Stadium; Attendance: 1,521; Referee: Daniel Elder

14 September 2022 Semi-final	Oakleigh Cannons	2–5	Macarthur FC	Melbourne
19:30 AEST	Guest 24'; Dekker 81'	Report	Dávila 44', 64' (pen.); Arzani 45+4', 55' (pen.); Hollman 58'	Stadium: Jack Edwards Reserve; Attendance: 5,200; Referee: Lachlan Keevers

1 October 2022 Final	Sydney United 58	0–2	Macarthur FC	Sydney
19:45 AEST		Report	Toure 32' (pen.); Dávila 90' (pen.)	Stadium: CommBank Stadium; Attendance: 16,641; Referee: Daniel Elder

== Statistics ==
=== Appearances and goals ===
Includes all competitions. Players with no appearances not included in the list.

As of 29 April 2023

No.	Pos.	Nat.	Player	A-League Men		Australia Cup		Total	
No.	Pos.	Nat.	Player	Apps	Goals	Apps	Goals	Apps	Goals
1	GK	(Australia)	Nicholas Suman	2+1	0	2	0	5	0
2	DF	(Australia)	Jake McGing	7+9	1	3+1	0	20	1
5	DF	(Australia)	Jonathan Aspropotamitis	20+2	1	5	1	27	2
6	DF	(Australia)	Tomislav Uskok	24	1	4	0	28	1
7	MF	(Australia)	Daniel De Silva	16+1	1	3	1	20	2
8	MF	(Australia)	Jake Hollman	16+1	0	2+2	1	21	1
9	FW	(Georgia (country))	Bachana Arabuli	11+4	5	0	0	15	5
10	MF	(Mexico)	Ulises Dávila	13	3	3	3	16	6
11	MF	(Australia)	Kearyn Baccus	18+2	0	5	0	25	0
12	GK	(Poland)	Filip Kurto	24	0	3	0	27	0
13	DF	(Australia)	Ivan Vujica	26	0	4+1	0	31	0
14	MF	(Australia)	Moudi Najjar	1+6	2	1+1	0	9	2
15	DF	(Australia)	Aleksandar Šušnjar	3+2	0	1	0	6	0
17	MF	(England)	Craig Noone	13+8	0	0+1	0	22	0
19	MF	(Australia)	Jesper Webber	0+1	0	0+3	0	4	0
20	FW	(United States)	Jason Romero	3+2	1	0	0	5	1
24	MF	(Australia)	Charles M'Mombwa	4+10	0	0+4	1	18	1
27	MF	(Australia)	Jerry Skotadis	10+10	0	1+3	0	24	0
31	FW	(Australia)	Lachlan Rose	9+4	4	4+1	3	18	7
35	FW	(Australia)	Al Hassan Toure	15+8	3	4+1	5	28	8
36	FW	(Australia)	Ali Auglah	3+8	0	0	0	11	0
37	FW	(Australia)	Jed Drew	6+16	2	1+1	0	24	2
41	MF	(Australia)	Oliver Jones	4+2	0	0	0	6	0
44	DF	(Australia)	Matt Millar	25+1	5	2	0	28	5
52	MF	(Australia)	Rhys Youlley	0+1	0	0	0	1	0
53	MF	(Australia)	Joel Bertolissio	0+1	0	0	0	1	0
99	FW	(Australia)	Daniel Arzani	12+7	1	4+1	3	24	4
Player(s) transferred out but featured this season
94	FW	(Australia)	Anthony Carter	2+8	1	3+2	1	15	2

=== Disciplinary record ===
Includes all competitions. The list is sorted by squad number when total cards are equal. Players with no cards not included in the list.

As of 29 April 2023

Rank	No.	Pos.	Nat.	Name	A-League Men			Australia Cup			Total		
Rank	No.	Pos.	Nat.	Name	Booked	(yellow card) (yellow-red card)	Sent off (straight red)	Booked	(yellow card) (yellow-red card)	Sent off (straight red)	Booked	(yellow card) (yellow-red card)	Sent off (straight red)
1	17	MF	(England)	Craig Noone	6	0	1	0	0	0	6	0	1
2	5	DF	(Australia)	Jonathan Aspropotamitis	5	0	1	0	0	0	5	0	1
3	11	MF	(Australia)	Kearyn Baccus	6	1	0	2	0	0	8	1	0
4	8	MF	(Australia)	Jake Hollman	3	1	0	1	0	0	4	1	0
5	6	DF	(Australia)	Tomislav Uskok	6	0	0	1	0	0	7	0	0
5	99	FW	(Australia)	Daniel Arzani	5	0	0	2	0	0	7	0	0
7	44	DF	(Australia)	Matthew Millar	5	0	0	0	0	0	5	0	0
8	27	MF	(Australia)	Jerry Skotadis	4	0	0	0	0	0	4	0	0
9	15	DF	(Australia)	Aleksandar Šušnjar	3	0	0	0	0	0	3	0	0
9	24	MF	(Australia)	Charles M'Mombwa	3	0	0	0	0	0	3	0	0
11	35	FW	(Australia)	Al Hassan Toure	2	0	0	0	0	0	2	0	0
11	37	FW	(Australia)	Jed Drew	2	0	0	0	0	0	2	0	0
13	1	GK	(Australia)	Nicholas Suman	1	0	0	0	0	0	1	0	0
13	7	MF	(Australia)	Daniel De Silva	1	0	0	0	0	0	1	0	0
13	9	FW	(Georgia (country))	Bachana Arabuli	1	0	0	0	0	0	1	0	0
13	10	MF	(Mexico)	Ulises Dávila	1	0	0	0	0	0	1	0	0
13	12	GK	(Poland)	Filip Kurto	1	0	0	0	0	0	1	0	0
13	31	FW	(Australia)	Lachlan Rose	1	0	0	0	0	0	1	0	0
13	41	MF	(Australia)	Oliver Jones	1	0	0	0	0	0	1	0	0
Player(s) transferred out but featured this season
1	94	FW	(Australia)	Anthony Carter	1	0	0	1	0	0	2	0	0
Total					58	2	2	7	0	0	65	2	2

=== Clean sheets ===
Includes all competitions. The list is sorted by squad number when total clean sheets are equal. Numbers in parentheses represent games where both goalkeepers participated and both kept a clean sheet; the number in parentheses is awarded to the goalkeeper who was substituted on, whilst a full clean sheet is awarded to the goalkeeper who was on the field at the start and end of play. Goalkeepers with no clean sheets not included in the list.

As of 29 April 2023

Rank	No.	Nat.	Goalkeeper	A-League Men	Australia Cup	Total
1	12	(Poland)	Filip Kurto	5	3	8
2	1	(Australia)	Nicholas Suman	1	0	1
Total				5	4	9
