= Jake Hollman =

Australian soccer player (born 2001)

Personal information
- Full name: Jake John Hollman
- Date of birth: 26 August 2001 (age 25)
- Place of birth: St Leonards, Australia
- Height: 1.80 m (5 ft 11 in)
- Position: Central midfielder

Team information
- Current team: Sydney FC
- Number: 15

Youth career
- Seaforth FC
- Manly United
- FNSW NTC
- Sydney FC

Senior career*
| Years | Team | Apps | (Gls) |
| 2019–2020 | Sydney FC NPL | 17 | (2) |
| 2020–2025 | Macarthur FC | 97 | (11) |
| 2025–2026 | Walsall | 3 | (0) |
| 2026– | Sydney FC | 0 | (0) |

International career^{‡}
| 2023–2024 | Australia U23 | 11 | (1) |
Medal record
Men's football
Representing Australia
WAFF U-23 Championship
| Runner-up | 2024 Saudi Arabia |
AFF U-19 Youth Championship
| Winner | 2019 Vietnam | U-20 Team |
- * Club domestic league appearances and goals as of 9 June 2026 ‡ National team caps and goals as of 21 July 2024

Jake John Hollman (born 26 August 2001) is an Australian professional soccer player who plays as a central midfielder for A-League Men club Sydney FC.

== Early life ==
Hollman was born on 26 August 2001 in the northern suburbs of Sydney, Australia, to Stuart and Samantha Hollman. He grew up in Seaforth, located 12 km north-east of Sydney CBD, with a younger brother, Corey, and a younger sister, Shay. He started playing soccer at the age of five at his local club, followed suit by his two younger siblings, and would join the ranks of Manly United and Sydney FC Academy during his junior years in the NPL.

== Club career ==
=== Macarthur FC ===
In October 2020, Hollman joined Macarthur FC for their inaugural season. He made his debut in the first match of the 2020–21 A-League season. In February 2021, after playing in five out of a possible eight matches, Hollman's contract was extended by a further two years. For most of 2022, Hollman was ruled out after he contracted glandular fever twice throughout the year. He lost 8kg during his recovery and missed the end of the 2021–22 and start of the 2022–23 seasons. On his return, Hollman lifted the 2022 Australia Cup despite his side later finishing bottom of the league. Hollman also extended for another two seasons at the club midway of the season, reportedly "turning down a handful of options" at other clubs. As a result of their cup victory, Macarthur qualified to the 2023–24 AFC Cup, where he featured in six matches. His side was knocked out in the zonal final by the eventual winners Central Coast Mariners.

The 2023–24 season saw Hollman transition into a key player under head coach Mile Sterjovski and started in his new role with three goals in his first seven league matches. He ended the season with five goals in 25 appearances, and was awarded the Macarthur Medal at the club's end of year ceremony. In the 2024 Australia Cup on 29 September, Hollman lifted his second trophy with the Bulls in a 1–0 victory over Melbourne Victory in the final. The 2024–25 season was his final season with Macarthur, ending a five-year stint with 16 goals and nine assists in total in all competitions for the club.

=== Walsall ===
On 28 July 2025, Hollman joined English League Two club Walsall on an initial two-year contract with the option for a further year. Following an injury-plagued season where he was limited to eight appearances in all competitions, Hollman left the club at the end of the 2025–26 EFL League Two season, with his contract mutually terminated by Walsall. Hollman revealed in an interview that he did not fit the system placed by the head coach at the time, Mat Sadler, and was told a month after his arrival that his opportunities for minutes were going to be limited.

=== Sydney FC ===
In June 2026, Hollman returned to his former academy club, signing a three-year contract with A-League Men side Sydney FC ahead of the 2026–27 A-League Men season. He made his debut during the 2026 Australia Cup and earned his first start for the club on 9 September in a 2–0 loss against Melbourne Victory in the semi-final.

== International career ==
=== Australia U20 ===
Hollman earned his first international call-up to the Australian under-18 squad that won the 2019 AFF U18 Championship. He was called up again to take part for the AFC U19 Championship qualifiers. However, the tournament was cancelled due to the COVID-19 pandemic.

=== Australia U23 ===
In June 2023, Hollman was called up to the Australia under-23 squad for the nation's first appearance in the Maurice Revello Tournament. Australia finished third after defeating France in the third-place play-off. Hollman scored the opening goal in the first half for his side's 2–0 victory in the play-off.

In September, Hollman was called up to the squad for the 2024 AFC U23 Asian Cup qualifiers. Australia topped their group of Laos and Tajikistan to qualify for the U23 Asian Cup in Doha. In March 2024, Hollman was included in the squad that took part in the WAFF U23 Championship. Australia finished runners-up to South Korea after losing on penalties in the final. A month later, he returned to the Olyroos' squad for the Asian Cup. In a group with Indonesia, Jordan, and Qatar, Australia finished third in the group and exited the tournament without scoring a goal. Hollman suffered an injury in the 21st minute in the goalless draw to Qatar on 21 April. He later stated that the performance by the team was "super disappointing" after Australia was expected to contend for a spot in the Summer Olympics.

== Career statistics ==
As of match played on 21 July 2025

Club statistics
| Club | Season | League | | | National Cup | | Other | | Total | |
| Club | Season | Division | Apps | Goals | Apps | Goals | Apps | Goals | Apps | Goals |
|---|---|---|---|---|---|---|---|---|---|---|
| Sydney FC NPL | 2019 | Football NSW | 13 | 0 | 0 | 0 | — | | 13 | 0 |
| Sydney FC NPL | 2020 | Football NSW | 4 | 2 | 0 | 0 | — | | 4 | 2 |
| Sydney FC NPL | Total | | 17 | 2 | 0 | 0 | 0 | 0 | 17 | 2 |
| Northbridge Bulls | 2021 | Football NSW | 5 | 3 | 0 | 0 | — | | 5 | 3 |
| Northbridge Bulls | Total | | 5 | 3 | 0 | 0 | 0 | 0 | 5 | 3 |
| Macarthur FC | 2020–21 | A-League | 17 | 0 | 0 | 0 | — | | 17 | 0 |
| Macarthur FC | 2021–22 | A-League | 13 | 1 | 1 | 0 | — | | 13 | 1 |
| Macarthur FC | 2022–23 | A-League Men | 17 | 0 | 4 | 1 | — | | 21 | 1 |
| Macarthur FC | 2023–24 | A-League Men | 25 | 5 | 1 | 1 | 6 (Note: Appearances in the AFC Cup) | 2 | 6 | 2 |
| Macarthur FC | 2024–25 | A-League Men | 25 | 5 | 3 | 1 | — | | 28 | 6 |
| Macarthur FC | Total | | 97 | 11 | 9 | 3 | 6 | 2 | 112 | 16 |
| Career totals | | | 119 | 16 | 9 | 3 | 6 | 2 | 134 | 21 |

== Honours ==
=== Player ===
Macarthur

- Australia Cup: 2022, 2024

Australia U-23

- WAFF U-23 Championship: runner-up 2024

Australia U-20

- AFF U-19 Youth Championship: 2019

=== Individual ===
- A-Leagues All Star: 2024
