= Craig Noone =

English footballer (born 1987)

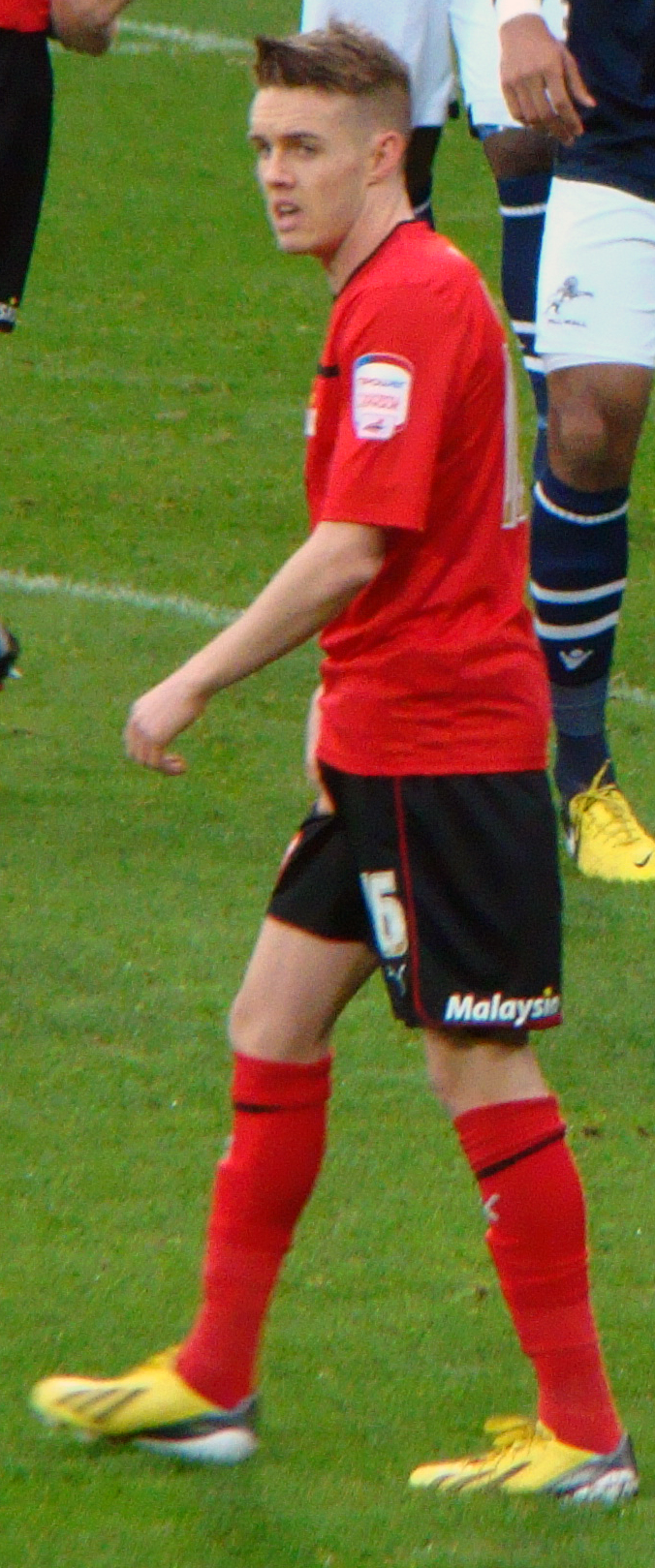
- Noone in 2012

Personal information
- Full name: Craig Stephen Noone
- Date of birth: 17 November 1987 (age 38)
- Place of birth: Kirkby, England
- Position: Winger

Team information
- Current team: Warrington Town (player-coach)

Senior career*
Years	Team	Apps	(Gls)
2005–2007	Skelmersdale United		
2007–2008	Burscough	24	(4)
2008	Southport	1	(0)
2008–2011	Plymouth Argyle	55	(5)
2009	→ Exeter City (loan)	7	(2)
2011–2012	Brighton & Hove Albion	59	(4)
2012–2017	Cardiff City	158	(16)
2017–2019	Bolton Wanderers	60	(2)
2019–2021	Melbourne City	48	(12)
2021–2023	Macarthur FC	44	(5)
2025–	Warrington Town	0	(0)

Managerial career
- 2023–2024: Bulls FC Academy
- * Club domestic league appearances and goals as of 12:42, 16 January 2025 (UTC)

Craig Stephen Noone (born 17 November 1987) is an English professional football manager and player who plays as a winger for Northern Premier League Premier Division club Warrington Town where he is a player-coach. During his playing career, he played for Plymouth Argyle, Exeter City, Brighton & Hove Albion, Cardiff City, Bolton Wanderers, and Melbourne City and Macarthur FC.

== Early life ==
Noone was born in Kirkby. He joined Liverpool when he was nine years old and was released 7 years later. He then played junior and amateur football before signing with Wrexham when he was 15. Having been released after a year there, Noone played non-league football and went to Myerscough football college for six months.

He trained as a roofer while a non-league player and in 2008 worked on an extension at Liverpool captain Steven Gerrard's house.

== Playing career ==
=== Non-League football ===
He joined Skelmersdale United as a youth team player and made his first team debut during the 2005–06 season. Noone had a trial with Belgian club Royal Antwerp in January 2007 and later that year joined Burscough, which Skelmersdale manager Tommy Lawson described as a "great opportunity" for him. Having been signed by Liam Watson, Noone played regularly in the Conference North in 2007–08. Watson left Burscough for Southport in June 2008 and Noone joined him a few days later. In August, he made his league debut before Southport received a club record offer of £110,000 for him from Plymouth Argyle.

=== Plymouth Argyle ===
Noone signed a two-year contract with Argyle the next day. "I am very excited by this signing," said manager Paul Sturrock. "Craig comes to us with a glowing reputation. It is now up to him to prove that it is merited." He made his debut at the end of the month in a 0–0 draw at Burnley, and scored his first goal for the club in a 1–0 win at Coventry City in November.

After 10 substitute appearances for Plymouth, Noone made his first start for the club in the league match versus Southampton on Boxing Day 2008, where his team won 2–0. On 3 January 2009, Noone made his FA Cup debut coming off the bench during a 3–1 loss to Arsenal at the Emirates Stadium. On 10 September 2009, after Noone had only made two league substitute appearances so far in the 2009/10 season, Exeter City signed him on a 3-month loan deal. He made his debut against Leyton Orient and scored the equaliser in a 1–1 draw. Noone scored in his final appearance for Exeter against Brentford before being recalled on 2 November.

=== Brighton & Hove Albion ===
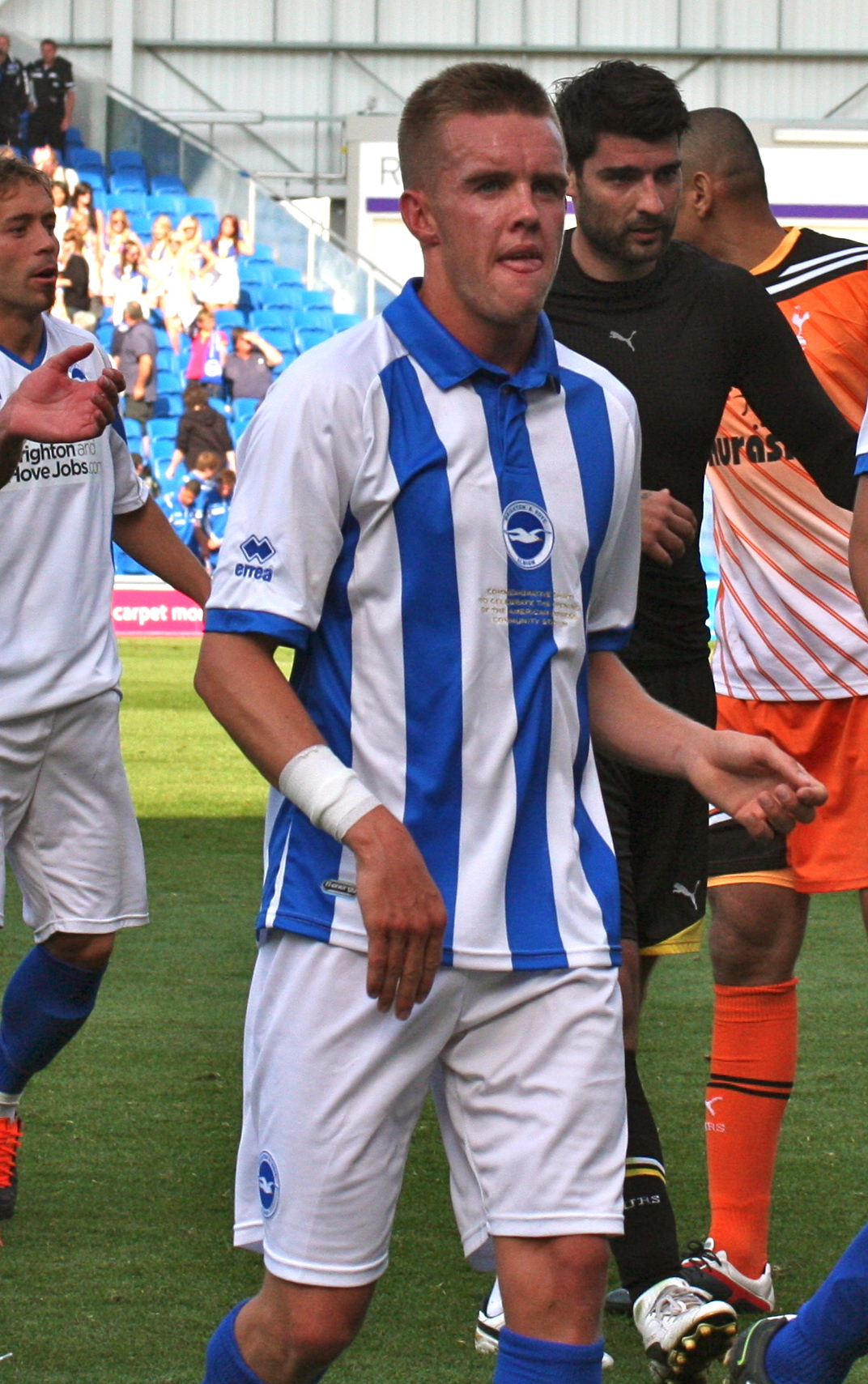
Noone playing for Brighton & Hove Albion in 2011

On 31 December 2010 it was confirmed that Noone had transferred to Brighton & Hove Albion for an undisclosed fee. He became a fan favourite at Brighton with his pace and his unerring ability to beat the defender. He scored twice for Brighton in their League One title season, a great individual goal at home against Colchester United and a volley at home against Hartlepool United.

He was part of Brighton's first match of pre-season in preparation for the 2011–2012 season against Burgess Hill. He played 45 minutes and impressed, having a long range effort well saved and he earned a penalty which he subsequently scored to make it 2–0.

On 21 September 2011, Noone was announced as the stadium sponsor's man of the match in a 1–2 defeat against his former employers and boyhood club, Liverpool, in a third round League Cup match at Falmer Stadium. The Liverpool-born player hit the crossbar from a long-range shot during the game and was praised by his boyhood hero Steven Gerrard.

In January 2012, Noone was subject to a £500,000 bid from Championship rivals Cardiff City, which was rejected by Albion. Noone extended his contract at Brighton in March 2012, keeping him at the club until June 2015.

=== Cardiff City ===
In August 2012, Noone joined Cardiff City for an undisclosed fee, reported to be £1m, and signed a four-year contract. He made his debut in a 3–1 win against Wolverhampton Wanderers at the start of September, and scored his first goal for the club later in the month as Cardiff won 2–0 at Millwall. Two months after joining the club, Noone scored in three consecutive games; a win against Burnley in October, and defeats at Bolton Wanderers and Charlton Athletic in November. He was sent off for two bookable offences against Derby County later that month. Noone's goal against Bolton in April ensured that Cardiff avoided defeat in their final home game of the season, which was followed by the club being presented with the Football League title for winning the Championship. Noone made 32 appearances in his first season with Cardiff and scored seven goals. Noone scored his first Premier League goal in January 2014 against Manchester City and was praised for his performance by Cardiff manager Ole Gunnar Solskjær. Cardiff however suffered relegation at the end of the season and returned to the Championship, where he only managed to find one goal in 39 appearances.

The following season, Noone started off brightly, coming on to score the equaliser against Fulham and scoring the winner against AFC Wimbledon. However, he didn't manage to find another goal until December when he scored against Sheffield Wednesday in a 2–2 draw, before scoring against Milton Keynes Dons.

=== Bolton Wanderers ===
On 31 August 2017, Noone joined Bolton Wanderers on a two-year contract.

=== Melbourne City ===
On 17 June 2019, Noone signed a two-year contract with Melbourne City in the A-League. He scored his first goal on debut against Campbelltown City in the Round of 32 in the 2019 FFA Cup.

=== Macarthur FC ===
After leaving Melbourne, he played for Macarthur FC for two years playing 44 times and scoring 5 goals.

=== Warrington Town ===
In January 2025, Noone came out of retirement, returning to England to join National League North club Warrington Town as a player-coach.

== Career statistics ==
As of 7 May 2023

Appearances and goals by club, season and competition
Club	Season	League			National cup		League Cup		Other		Total	
Club	Season	Division	Apps	Goals	Apps	Goals	Apps	Goals	Apps	Goals	Apps	Goals
Plymouth Argyle	2008–09	Championship	21	1	1	0	0	0	0	0	22	1
Plymouth Argyle	2009–10	Championship	17	1	1	0	1	0	0	0	19	1
Plymouth Argyle	2010–11	League One	17	3	1	0	1	0	2 (Note: Appearances in the Football League Trophy)	1	21	4
Plymouth Argyle	Total		55	5	3	0	2	0	2	1	62	6
Exeter City (loan)	2009–10	League One	7	2	0	0	0	0	0	0	7	2
Brighton & Hove Albion	2010–11	League One	23	2	0	0	0	0	0	0	23	2
Brighton & Hove Albion	2011–12	Championship	33	2	1	0	3	0	0	0	37	2
Brighton & Hove Albion	2012–13	Championship	3	0	0	0	1	0	0	0	4	0
Brighton & Hove Albion	Total		59	4	1	0	4	0	0	0	64	4
Cardiff City	2012–13	Championship	35	7	0	0	0	0	0	0	35	7
Cardiff City	2013–14	Premier League	14	1	3	1	2	1	0	0	19	3
Cardiff City	2014–15	Championship	37	1	2	0	0	0	0	0	39	1
Cardiff City	2015–16	Championship	38	5	1	0	2	1	0	0	40	6
Cardiff City	2016–17	Championship	34	2	1	0	1	0	0	0	36	2
Cardiff City	Total		158	16	7	1	5	2	0	0	170	19
Bolton Wanderers	2017–18	Championship	24	1	1	0	1	0	0	0	26	1
Bolton Wanderers	2018–19	Championship	36	1	2	0	1	0	0	0	39	1
Bolton Wanderers	Total		60	2	3	0	2	0	0	0	65	2
Melbourne City	2019–20	A-League	27	5	5	4	—		—		32	9
Melbourne City	2020–21	A-League	23	6	—		—		—		23	6
Melbourne City	Total		50	11	5	4	0	0	0	0	55	15
Macarthur FC	2021–22	A-League Men	23	5	1	0	—		—		24	5
Macarthur FC	2022–23	A-League Men	21	0	1	0	—		—		22	0
Macarthur FC	Total		44	5	2	0	0	0	0	0	46	5
Career total			426	43	21	5	13	2	2	1	462	51

== Coaching career ==
In 2023, Noone was appointed as the head coach to the Bulls FC Academy men's team. He replaced the former coach Zeljko Kalac. Noone said upon receiving the position, "Coaching is something that I have always been passionate about and I started my coaching badges back in 2016." The Macarthur Bulls announced the departure of Noone as Bulls FC Academy Men's Coach on 31 October 2024, stating he was returning to the UK for personal reasons.

== Honours ==
Brighton & Hove Albion

- Football League One: 2010–11

Cardiff City

- Football League Championship: 2012–13

Melbourne City

- A-League Premiership: 2020–21
- A-League Championship: 2021

Macarthur FC

- Australia Cup: 2022

Individual

- A-League PFA Team Of The Season: 2020–21
