= Ariath Piol =

Australian soccer player (born 2004)

Personal information
- Full name: Ariath Deng Piol
- Date of birth: 11 October 2004 (age 22)
- Place of birth: Adelaide, South Australia, Australia
- Height: 1.76 m (5 ft 9 in)
- Position: Striker

Team information
- Current team: Real Salt Lake
- Number: 19

Youth career
- Campbelltown City
- FFSA NTC
- MetroStars

Senior career*
Years	Team	Apps	(Gls)
2020–2022	MetroStars	46	(9)
2023	Western Sydney Wanderers NPL	18	(5)
2023–2024	Bulls FC Academy	20	(9)
2024–2025	Macarthur FC	11	(4)
2025–	Real Salt Lake	24	(1)
2025–	Real Monarchs	3	(1)
- * Club domestic league appearances and goals as of 24 October 2025

Ariath Deng Piol (born 11 October 2004) is an Australian soccer player who plays as a striker for Real Salt Lake in Major League Soccer.

== Early life ==
Piol was born in Adelaide to parents from Sudan who fled to Australia from the Second Sudanese Civil War in the 1980s. He grew up playing Australian rules football before switching to association football. As a child, he became close friends with fellow professional footballer Mohamed Touré.

== Career ==
Piol played for National Premier Leagues South Australia side MetroStars in his native Adelaide before joining the Western Sydney Wanderers NPL team after a successful trial for the 2023 season. Midway through the 2023 season, Piol joined the youth team of Macarthur FC.

In January 2024, Piol was promoted to the Macarthur FC first team signing a scholarship contract until the end of the season. Piol made two appearances and scored one goal in a 2-1 win against his hometown club Adelaide United. At the end of the season, Piol signed a two-year contract extension.

The 2024–25 season was a breakout season for Piol. He was a part of the Macarthur side that won the 2024 and came on as a substitute in the final. In the league, Piol's good form attracted interest from overseas clubs such as Troyes, St. Gallen and Real Salt Lake. On 23 January 2025, it was announced that Piol signed for Real Salt Lake in the MLS for an undisclosed fee.

== Honours ==
Macarthur FC

- Australia Cup: 2024
