= Kévin Boli =

Ivorian footballer (born 1991)

Personal information
- Full name: Kévin Gnonher Boli
- Date of birth: 21 June 1991 (age 35)
- Place of birth: Lens, France
- Height: 1.83 m (6 ft 0 in)
- Position: Defender

Team information
- Current team: Dubai City

Youth career
- –2007: Lens
- 2007–2011: Sedan

Senior career*
Years	Team	Apps	(Gls)
2011–2013	Sedan	41	(2)
2013–2015	Mouscron-Péruwelz	52	(2)
2015–2017	Viitorul Constanța	68	(4)
2017–2018	CFR Cluj	14	(0)
2018–2020	Guizhou Hengfeng	12	(1)
2019–2020	→ CFR Cluj (loan)	25	(2)
2020	CFR Cluj	1	(0)
2020–2022	Samsunspor	25	(0)
2022–2023	Botoșani	12	(0)
2023–2024	Farul Constanța	40	(0)
2024–2025	Kheybar	12	(1)
2025	Macarthur FC	9	(1)
2025–2026	Vevey-Sports	2	(0)
2026–	Dubai City		

International career
2011	Ivory Coast U20	2	(0)
- * Club domestic league appearances and goals as of 15 May 2025

Kévin Gnonher Boli (born 21 June 1991) is a professional footballer who plays for Dubai City as a defender.

After starting his professional career with Sedan in the French second division, he moved to Belgian side Mouscron-Péruwelz in 2013. Boli changed countries again after two seasons, signing for Viitorul Constanța in Romania, where he helped to a national title, before being transferred to CFR Cluj.

Born in France, Boli represented Ivory Coast at under-20 level.

Boli is one of the most successful foreign players that has ever played in the Liga I. He has won 5 consecutive championships between 2017 and 2021. 1 with Viitorul Constanța and 4 with CFR Cluj.

== Club career ==
=== Sedan ===
Born in Lens, France, Boli began his career at his hometown club, Lens, before signing his first professional contract with Sedan in June 2011, having trained with the club since February 2011.

On 23 July 2011, Boli made his professional debut against them in the first round of Coupe de la Ligue, which saw Sedan win 4–1 to advance to the next stage. However, his next appearance in the second round of Coupe de la Ligue against US Boulogne saw him get sent–off for a second bookable offence and was suspended as a result. His first goal came on 31 August 2011, in a 2–0 win over FC Nantes in the third round of the Coupe de la Ligue. On 30 September 2011, Boli made his senior debut for Sedan, in a 2–2 away draw with Monaco for the Ligue 2 championship. Towards the end of the 2011–12 season, he was featured as a substitute in a number of matches and ended up making 16 appearances and scoring once in all competitions. For his performance during the season, Boli signed a contract with Sedan, keeping him until 2014.

In the 2012–13 season, Boli made his first appearance of the season, where he started the whole game, in a 3–2 loss against FC Metz in the first round of Coupe de la Ligue. He managed to win a place in the first team in a number of matches for the side. Then, Boli scored his first goal of the season, in a 2–1 win over Le Mans on 8 March 2013. He scored again on 3 May 2013, in a 4–2 loss against Dijon FCO. However, the club found themselves in a relegation zone throughout the 2012–13 season and were eventually relegated to Championnat de France Amateur. Despite this, Boli went on to finish the 2012–13 season, making 29 appearances and scoring two times in all competitions. During his spell with Les Sangliers, he amassed competitive totals of 46 games and three goals.

=== Mouscron-Péruwelz ===
Boli moved abroad for the first time in July 2013, signing a contract with Belgian side Mouscron-Péruwelz.

His Mouscron-Péruwelz debut came on 10 August 2013, where he started the whole game, in a 2–1 win over RWS Bruxelles. Since joining the club, he quickly established himself in the starting eleven for the side. On 12 April 2014, he scored his first goal for the club, in a 2–1 win over R.W.D.M. Brussels. Later in the 2013–14 season, Boli helped the side get promoted to Jupiler Pro League next season. He finished the season, making 32 appearances and scoring once in all competitions.

At the start of the 2014–15 season, Boli found himself at the substitute bench and away from the first team. On 24 September 2014, he made his first appearance of the season against K.V.V. Coxyde in the sixth round of Beker Van Belgie but was sent–off for a second bookable offence, as they were eliminated in penalty shoot–out after the game went extra time. By October, Boli regained back his first team place for the side, mostly playing in either the centre-back position or the right-back position. In a 1–0 loss against Zulte Waregem on 20 December 2014, he was sent–off at the last minutes for showing a gesture at an opposition player, resulting him sent–off; but a few days later, no charges were made against him and resumed playing in a next match. On 18 April 2015, he scored his first goal of the season, in a 5–1 loss against Lokeren. At the end of the 2014–15 season, Boli went on to make 20 appearances and scoring once in all competitions.

=== Viitorul Constanța ===
On 14 August 2015, Boli penned a three-year deal with Romanian top-flight club Viitorul Constanța.

He made his Viitorul Constanța debut, where he came on as a substitute for Cristian Ganea, in a 4–0 win over Poli Timișoara. He then set up a goal for Aurelian Chițu to score the club's second goal of the game, in a 3–1 win over FC Botoșani on 26 October 2015. Since making his debut for the club, Boli quickly established himself in the starting eleven, where he played in the centre-back positions. He occasionally played in the full-back position on two occasions. He scored his first competitive goal in a 6–1 home success over ASA Târgu Mureș on 2 May 2016. At the end of the 2015–16 season, he went on to make 33 appearances and scoring once in all competitions.

In the 2016–17 season, his first appearance of the season came on 14 August 2016, starting the whole game, in a 3–1 win over Târgu Mureș. He started out playing in the centre-back position for the next two matches, before playing in the left-back position for a while. On 31 October 2016, he scored his first goal of the season, in a 2–1 win over FC Voluntari. He also scored on 25 November 2016, in a 2–0 win over Târgu Mureș. This was followed up by helping the club keep two cleans sheets in the next two matches. By late November, he returned to his centre-back position, where he played for the rest of the season. He then scored his third goal of the season on 4 February 2017, in a 2–1 win over Dinamo București. Boli made 33 appearances and netted three goals in the 2016–17 Liga I, as Viitorul claimed its first-ever league title. For his performance, Boli, along with Romario Benzar and Florinel Coman, were named the league's Team of the Year.

Ahead of the 2017–18 season, Boli was linked a move away from the club, as clubs from Greece, Romania and Turkey were interested in signing him. He appeared as the club's captain for the first time in his Viitorul Constanța career, in a 1–0 loss against Dinamo București on 31 July 2017. On 5 August 2017, he was sent–off for a second bookable offence, in a 1–0 loss against Sepsi Sfântu Gheorghe. By the time of his departure, Boli went on to make eleven appearances in all competitions for the side.

=== CFR Cluj ===
On 4 September 2017, the last day of the summer transfer window in Romania, CFR Cluj transferred Boli for a fee of around €500,000. The deal also seen Răzvan Horj going the other way to Viitorul Constanța.

After appearing as an unused substitute against Universitatea Craiova on 10 September 2017, Boli made his CFR Cluj debut, where he started the whole game, in a 1–0 win over Concordia Chiajna seven days later. Since making his debut for the club, Boli played in a number of matches as a centre-back position. He was then involved in the four matches between 29 October 2017 and 27 November 2017, that saw him help the club keep four clean sheets. However, he suffered an injury in early December and was sidelined until March. Boli returned to the first team on 31 March 2018, where he started the whole game and kept a clean sheet, in a 0–0 draw against Universitatea Craiova. He played in every match since returning from injury, until his sending off against Universitatea Craiova on 6 May 2018 and never played again for the rest of the season. Despite this, on 20 May 2018, "the Railwaymen" won 1–0 over defending champions Viitorul Constanța and clinched their fourth Liga I title, as they finished one point above FCSB in the table. At the end of the 2017–18 season, Boli went on to make 14 appearances for the side.

=== Guizhou Hengfeng ===
On 14 July 2018, Boli left CFR Cluj and joined Chinese club Guizhou Hengfeng for a reported €2.5 million. Upon joining the club, he was given a number 39 shirt for the side.

However, his start to his career at Guizhou Hengfeng suffered a setback when he suffered an injury, and didn't play on 11 August 2018 against Hebei China Fortune and started the whole game, as they lost 1–0 against them. On 20 October 2018, he scored his first goal for Guizhou Hengfeng, in a 3–0 win over Dalian Yifang. Despite the club's relegation at the end of the 2018 season, Boli was praised by the Dongqiudi website for his performance and was the club's fan favourite. Boli went on to make 14 appearances for the side.

=== Return to CFR Cluj ===
In February 2019, he returned to CFR Cluj on loan. On 3 September 2019, he was loaned again with an option to buy to CFR Cluj.

=== Macarthur FC ===
On 4 February 2025, Boli signed for Macarthur FC in Australia.

== International career ==
Boli was selected in the squad of Ivory Coast under-20 national team for the 2011 Toulon Tournament, where he made two appearances.

== Personal life ==
Boli is the son of the Ivorian former footballer Roger Boli, and nephew of French former footballer Basile Boli. He is the brother of Yohan Boli and Charles Boli, and the cousin of Yannick Boli.

== Career statistics ==
As of match played 3 May 2025

Appearances and goals by club, season and competition
Club	Season	League			National cup (Note: Includes Coupe de France, Belgian Cup, Cupa României, Chinese FA Cup, Turkish Cup, Iranian Hazfi Cup)		League cup (Note: Includes Coupe de la Ligue, Cupa Ligii)		Continental		Other		Total	
Club	Season	Division	Apps	Goals	Apps	Goals	Apps	Goals	Apps	Goals	Apps	Goals	Apps	Goals
Sedan	2011–12	Ligue 2	13	0	1	0	3	1	—		—		17	1
Sedan	2012–13	Ligue 2	28	2	0	0	1	0	—		—		29	2
Sedan	Total		41	2	1	0	4	1	—		—		46	3
Mouscron-Péruwelz	2013–14	Belgian Second Division	29	1	1	1	—		—		4	0	34	2
Mouscron-Péruwelz	2014–15	Belgian Pro League	23	1	1	0	—		—		—		24	1
Mouscron-Péruwelz	Total		52	2	2	1	—		—		4	0	58	3
Viitorul Constanța	2015–16	Liga I	28	1	3	0	2	0	—		—		33	1
Viitorul Constanța	2016–17	Liga I	33	3	2	0	1	0	0	0	—		36	3
Viitorul Constanța	2017–18	Liga I	7	0	0	0	—		3 (Note: Two appearances in UEFA Champions League, one appearance in UEFA Europa League)	0	1 (Note: Appearance in Supercupa României)	0	11	0
Viitorul Constanța	Total		68	4	5	0	3	0	3	0	1	0	80	4
CFR Cluj	2017–18	Liga I	14	0	0	0	—		—		—		14	0
Guizhou Hengfeng	2018	Chinese Super League	12	1	1	0	—		—		—		13	1
CFR Cluj (loan)	2018–19	Liga I	10	0	0	0	—		—		—		14	0
CFR Cluj (loan)	2019–20	Liga I	15	2	0	0	—		6 (Note: Appearances in UEFA Europa League)	0	—		21	2
CFR Cluj (loan)	Total		25	2	0	0	—		6	0	—		31	2
CFR Cluj	2020–21	Liga I	1	0	—		—		1 (Note: Appearance in UEFA Champions League)	0	—		2	0
Samsunspor	2020–21	TFF 1. Lig	16	0	0	0	—		—		—		16	0
Samsunspor	2021–22	TFF 1. Lig	9	0	1	0	—		—		—		10	0
Samsunspor	Total		25	0	1	0	—		—		—		26	0
Botoșani	2022–23	Liga I	12	0	1	0	—		—		—		13	0
Farul Constanța	2022–23	Liga I	13	0	—		—		—		—		13	0
Farul Constanța	2023–24	Liga I	27	0	1	0	—		8 (Note: Two appearances in UEFA Champions League, six appearances in UEFA Europa Conference League)	0	1	0	37	0
Farul Constanța	Total		40	0	1	0	—		8	0	1	0	50	0
Kheybar	2024–25	Persian Gulf Pro League	12	1	1	0	—		—		—		13	1
Macarthur FC	2024–25	A-League Men	9	1	—		—		—		—		9	1
Career total			311	13	13	1	7	1	18	0	6	0	355	15

== Honours ==
Viitorul Constanța

- Liga I: 2016–17
- Supercupa României runner-up: 2017

CFR Cluj

- Liga I: 2017–18, 2018–19, 2019–20, 2020–21

Farul Constanța

- Liga I: 2022–23
- Supercupa României runner-up: 2023

Individual

- Liga I Team of the Season: 2016–17
