= Moudi Najjar =

Footballer (born 2000)

Personal information
- Date of birth: 20 June 2000 (age 26)
- Place of birth: Liverpool, New South Wales, Australia
- Height: 1.82 m (6 ft 0 in)
- Position: Forward

Team information
- Current team: Rockdale Ilinden
- Number: 9

Youth career
- 2016: Bonnyrigg White Eagles

Senior career*
Years	Team	Apps	(Gls)
2016–2017	Western Sydney Wanderers Youth	14	(4)
2018–2019	Melbourne City Youth	47	(33)
2019–2021	Melbourne City	7	(1)
2020–2021	→ Macarthur FC (loan)	14	(0)
2021	→ Northbridge FC (loan)	12	(3)
2021–2023	Macarthur FC	22	(3)
2024	Hwaseong FC	13	(3)
2025–	Rockdale Ilinden	58	(22)

International career^{‡}
2017–2018	Australia U19	3	(3)
- * Club domestic league appearances and goals as of 2 August 2026 ‡ National team caps and goals as of 25 October 2018

Moudi Najjar (Arabic: مودي النجار; born 20 June 2000) is a professional footballer who plays as a forward for National Premier Leagues NSW club Rockdale Ilinden. Born in Australia, Najjar was called up to the Syria national team in 2023.

== Club career ==
=== Western Sydney Wanderers ===
At the age of 17, Najjar played his first game in his youth starting career. Najjar came on for Mohamed Adam while scoring his first goal for Western Sydney Wanderers Youth in an 8–0 win over Canberra United Youth.

Najjar was part of the 2017–18 Y-League championship winning Western Sydney Wanderers Youth team. He replaced Fabian Monge in the 71st minute as they beat Melbourne City Youth 3–1 in the 2018 Y-League Grand Final on 3 February 2018.

=== Melbourne City ===
On 1 July 2017, Najjar signed a two-year scholarship contract with Melbourne City. He made his professional debut as a second-half substitute in a Round 15 clash with his former club Western Sydney Wanderers, City running out 4–3 winners at AAMI Park.

Najjar signed his first professional contract on 11 September 2019, penning a two-year deal with the club. He scored his first A-League goal in the final regular season match of the 2019–20 season, a 3–1 win over Western United.

=== Macarthur FC ===
Following the conclusion of the 2019–20 A-League season, Najjar went on loan to new A-League club Macarthur FC for the 2020–21 A-League season. He also played for their National Premier Leagues NSW affiliate club, Northbridge FC.

In July 2021, Macarthur FC confirmed that Najjar's loan agreement with Melbourne City had been mutually closed, allowing Najjar to sign a two-year contract with Macarthur. He departed the club mid-2023.

=== Rockdale Ilinden and Hwaseong FC ===
On 30 January 2024, Najjar was due to join Rockdale Ilinden ahead of the NPL New South Wales season. However few days later, on 7 February 2024, he signed for K3 League side Hwaseong FC, scoring three league goals. He eventually signed for Rockdale Ilinden in January 2025.

== International career ==
Born in Australia, Najjar is of Syrian descent from his mother and Lebanese descent from his father.

Najjar took part in the SBS Cup in Japan with Australia under-18 between 16 and 19 August 2018, finishing third. On 10 June 2023, it was announced that Najjar had accepted a callup to the Syria national team for their friendly against Vietnam.

== Career statistics ==
=== Club ===
As of match played 2 August 2026

Club	Season	League			National cup (Note: Includes Australia Cup, Korean FA Cup)		Other		Total	
Club	Season	Division	Apps	Goals	Apps	Goals	Apps	Goals	Apps	Goals
Western Sydney Wanderers Youth	2016	NPL 2 NSW	8	1	—		—		8	1
Western Sydney Wanderers Youth	2017	NPL 2 NSW	6	3	—		—		6	3
Western Sydney Wanderers Youth	Total		14	4	0	0	0	0	14	4
Melbourne City Youth	2018	NPL 2 East VIC	26	20	—		—		26	20
Melbourne City Youth	2019	NPL 2 East VIC	21	13	—		—		21	13
Melbourne City Youth	Total		47	33	0	0	0	0	47	33
Melbourne City	2018–19	A-League	2	0	—		—		2	0
Melbourne City	2019–20	A-League	5	1	1	0	—		6	1
Melbourne City	Total		7	1	1	0	0	0	8	1
Macarthur FC (loan)	2020–21	A-League	14	0	—		—		14	0
Northbridge FC (loan)	2021	NPL NSW	12	3	—		—		12	3
Macarthur FC	2021–22	A-League	15	1	1	0	—		16	1
Macarthur FC	2022–23	A-League	7	2	2	0	—		9	2
Macarthur FC	Total		22	3	3	0	0	0	25	3
Hwaseong FC	2024	K3 League	13	3	1	0	—		14	3
Rockdale Ilinden	2025	NPL NSW	33	9	—		3 (Note: Appearances in Australia Cup preliminary rounds)	1	36	10
Rockdale Ilinden	2026	NPL NSW	25	13	—		4	3	29	16
Rockdale Ilinden	Total		58	22	0	0	7	4	65	26
Career total			187	69	5	0	7	4	199	73

== Honours ==
Western Sydney Wanderers

- Y-League: 2017–18

Macarthur FC

- Australia Cup: 2022

Individual

- Y-League Golden Boot: 2018–19
