= Filip Kurto =

Polish footballer

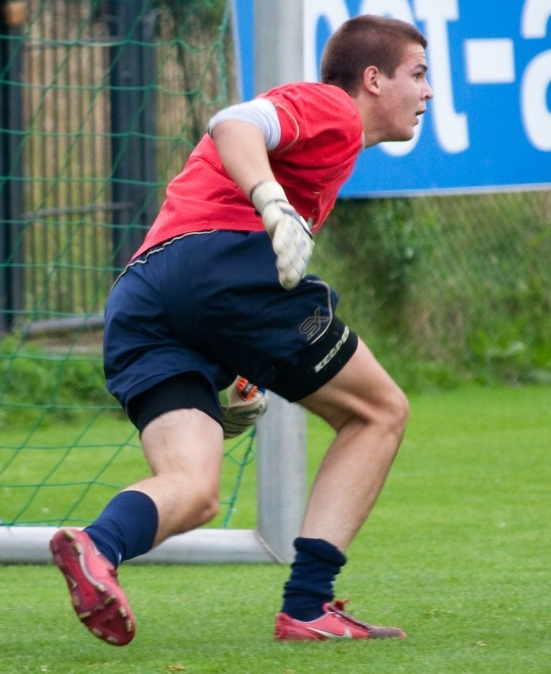
- Kurto in 2009

Personal information
- Date of birth: 14 June 1991 (age 35)
- Place of birth: Olsztyn, Poland
- Height: 1.91 m (6 ft 3 in)
- Position: Goalkeeper

Team information
- Current team: Sydney Olympic

Youth career
- 1998–2005: Naki Olsztyn
- 2005–2006: OKS 1945 Olsztyn
- 2006–2007: Warmia Olsztyn
- 2007–2008: Promień Opalenica

Senior career*
Years	Team	Apps	(Gls)
2008	Promień Opalenica	13	(0)
2009–2012	Wisła Kraków	2	(0)
2012–2014	Roda JC Kerkrade	65	(0)
2014–2015	Dordrecht	32	(0)
2015–2017	Excelsior	11	(0)
2017–2018	Roda JC Kerkrade	0	(0)
2018–2019	Wellington Phoenix	25	(0)
2019–2021	Western United	36	(0)
2021–2026	Macarthur FC	120	(0)
2026–	Sydney Olympic	9	(0)

International career
2009	Poland U18	4	(0)
2009–2010	Poland U19	9	(0)
2011	Poland U20	1	(0)
2011	Poland U21	6	(0)
- * Club domestic league appearances and goals as of 31 August 2026

Filip Kurto (Polish: [ˈfi.lip ˈkur.tɔ]; born 14 June 1991) is a Polish professional footballer who plays as a goalkeeper for Sydney Olympic in the NPL NSW.

== Club career ==
Kurto began his career when he was seven years old at Naki Olsztyn. In 2005, he moved to OKS 1945 Olsztyn's youth team. In 2006, Kurto joined Warmia Olsztyn. In 2007, he moved to Promień Opalenica. In the 2008–09 season, he played regularly for the Promień first squad in the Polish fourth tier. In December 2008, he was invited by Wisła Kraków for a trial. In March 2009, he moved to Wisła Kraków. In July 2009, Kurto signed a new three-year contract with Wisła. In July 2013, Kurto moved to Dutch side Roda JC Kerkrade on a free transfer. In September 2013, Kurto scored an own goal during a 3–3 draw against FC Utrecht in the Eredivisie. He was released in July 2014 and signed with FC Dordrecht later on. After the relegation of FC Dordrecht, Kurto found a new Eredivisie club in Excelsior.

=== Wellington Phoenix ===
On 18 July 2018, it was announced that Kurto had signed a two-year deal with New Zealand club Wellington Phoenix, playing in the A-League. After consolidating his starting position at the club, on 2 December 2018 Kurto suffered a serious head injury following a collision with Perth Glory striker Andy Keogh.

=== Western United ===
On 14 May 2019, it was announced that Kurto was leaving the Phoenix to join new A-League club Western United.

=== Macarthur FC ===
On 26 October 2021, Kurto signed for Macarthur FC.

On 29 September 2024, Kurto became the first goalkeeper to win the Mark Viduka Medal, awarded to the best player in the Australia Cup final.

== International career ==
Kurto made his debut for the Poland U18 team on 24 March 2009 in a match against Portugal. On 13 August 2009, he played his first match for under-19s.

In August 2010, he earned his first call-up to Poland U20s for the friendly matches against Uzbekistan and Italy.

== Career statistics ==
As of match played 24 April 2026

Appearances and goals by club, season and competition
Club	Season	League			National cup (Note: Includes Polish Cup, KNVB Cup, Australia Cup)		Continental		Total	
Club	Season	Division	Apps	Goals	Apps	Goals	Apps	Goals	Apps	Goals
Promień Opalenica	2008–09	III liga, gr. C	13	0	4	0	—		17	0
Wisła Kraków	2010–11	Ekstraklasa	2	0	0	0	0	0	2	0
Roda JC	2012–13	Eredivisie	31	0	1	0	—		32	0
Roda JC	2013–14	Eredivisie	34	0	4	0	—		38	0
Roda JC	Total		65	0	5	0	—		70	0
FC Dordrecht	2014–15	Eredivisie	32	0	2	0	—		34	0
Excelsior	2015–16	Eredivisie	11	0	0	0	—		11	0
Excelsior	2016–17	Eredivisie	0	0	0	0	—		0	0
Excelsior	Total		11	0	0	0	—		11	0
Roda JC	2017–18	Eredivisie	0	0	0	0	—		0	0
Wellington Phoenix	2018–19	A-League Men	25	0	1	0	—		26	0
Western United	2019–20	A-League Men	28	0	0	0	—		28	0
Western United	2020–21	A-League Men	8	0	0	0	—		8	0
Western United	Total		36	0	0	0	—		36	0
Macarthur FC	2021–22	A-League Men	24	0	1	0	—		25	0
Macarthur FC	2022–23	A-League Men	24	0	3	0	—		27	0
Macarthur FC	2023–24	A-League Men	28	0	1	0	5 (Note: Appearances in AFC Champions League Two)	0	34	0
Macarthur FC	2024–25	A-League Men	25	0	5	0	—		34	0
Macarthur FC	2025–26	A-League Men	19	0	3	0	7	0	29	0
Macarthur FC	Total		120	0	13	0	12	0	145	0
Career total			304	0	25	0	12	0	341	0

== Honours ==
Wisła Kraków

- Ekstraklasa: 2010–11

Macarthur

- Australia Cup: 2022, 2024

Individual

- A-League Goalkeeper of the Year: 2018–19
- A-Leagues All Star: 2022
- Mark Viduka Medal: 2024
