= Walter Scott (soccer) =

Australian soccer player

- Scott playing for the Wellington Phoenix in 2026

Personal information
- Full name: Walter Edward Fitzgerald Scott
- Date of birth: 2 October 1999 (age 27)
- Place of birth: Bowral, Australia
- Height: 1.76 m (5 ft 9 1/2 in)
- Position: Left back

Team information
- Current team: Wellington Phoenix
- Number: 5

Youth career
- 2015–2016: Perth Glory

Senior career*
| Years | Team | Apps | (Gls) |
| 2016–2019 | Perth Glory NPL | 36 | (4) |
| 2018–2019 | Perth Glory | 2 | (0) |
| 2019–2020 | Wellington Phoenix | 3 | (0) |
| 2019–2020 | Wellington Phoenix Reserves | 4 | (0) |
| 2020–2021 | Macarthur FC | 1 | (0) |
| 2021 | → Northbridge Bulls (loan) | 13 | (0) |
| 2022 | APIA Leichhardt | 20 | (0) |
| 2023–2024 | Wollongong Wolves | 27 | (0) |
| 2024–2026 | Macarthur FC | 44 | (0) |
| 2026– | Wellington Phoenix | 0 | (0) |

International career^{‡}
| 2018 | Australia U20 | 3 | (0) |
- * Club domestic league appearances and goals as of 5 February 2025 ‡ National team caps and goals as of 30 October 2018

Walter Scott (born 2 October 1999) is an Australian professional soccer player who plays as a left back for A-League Men club Wellington Phoenix.

== International career ==
In October 2018, Scott was called up to the Australia U20 squad to compete in the 2018 AFC U-19 Championship held in Indonesia.

== Honours ==
Perth Glory

- A-League Premiership: 2018–19

Macarthur

- Australia Cup: 2024
