= Jed Drew =

Australian soccer player

Personal information
- Full name: Jed Francis Drew
- Date of birth: 29 August 2003 (age 23)
- Place of birth: Canberra, Australia
- Height: 1.79 m (5 ft 10 1/2 in)
- Position: Winger

Team information
- Current team: TSV Hartberg
- Number: 79

Youth career
- Blue Mountains FC
- Meltham AFC
- 2015–2016: Blacktown City
- 2017–2019: Sydney FC
- 2020–2021: Blacktown City

Senior career*
Years	Team	Apps	(Gls)
2022–2023	Northbridge Bulls	20	(3)
2022–2025	Macarthur FC	61	(10)
2025–	TSV Hartberg	28	(4)

International career^{‡}
2023–2024	Australia U20	4	(0)
2025–	Australia U23	4	(0)
- * Club domestic league appearances and goals as of 10 June 2026 ‡ National team caps and goals as of 14 January 2026

Jed Francis Drew (born 29 August 2003) is an Australian professional soccer player who plays as a winger for Austrian Football Bundesliga club TSV Hartberg.

== Club career ==
He made his Macarthur debut in an Australia Cup Round of 32 match against Magpies Crusaders on 30 July 2022. Drew made his A-League Men debut against Adelaide United on 16 October 2022 as a 77th-minute substitute for Al Hassan Toure. Drew made his first A-League Men start and scored his first professional goal on 13 November 2022 when he scored the winning goal in a 2–3 victory against Central Coast Mariners.

On 2 February 2025, Drew signed a three-and-a-half-year contract with TSV Hartberg in Austria.

== Personal life ==
Jed is the son of former Australian Rugby League player, Brad Drew, who played with Penrith Panthers, Parramatta Eels, and Canberra Raiders in the NRL.

== Honours ==
Macarthur

- Australia Cup: 2024
