= Ulises Dávila =

Mexican footballer (born 1991)

Personal information
- Full name: Ulises Alejandro Dávila Plascencia
- Date of birth: 13 April 1991 (age 35)
- Place of birth: Guadalajara, Jalisco, Mexico
- Height: 1.73 m (5 ft 8 in)
- Position: Attacking midfielder

Youth career
- 2001–2008: Guadalajara

Senior career*
Years	Team	Apps	(Gls)
2008–2011	Guadalajara	15	(0)
2008–2009	→ Tapatío (loan)	17	(3)
2011–2015	Chelsea	0	(0)
2011–2012	→ Vitesse (loan)	2	(0)
2012–2013	→ Sabadell (loan)	35	(4)
2013–2014	→ Córdoba (loan)	37	(7)
2014–2015	→ Tenerife (loan)	10	(1)
2015	→ Vitória Setúbal (loan)	14	(0)
2016–2018	Santos Laguna	38	(3)
2019	Delhi Dynamos	6	(1)
2019–2021	Wellington Phoenix	49	(19)
2021–2024	Macarthur FC	61	(19)

International career
2007	Mexico U17	1	(0)
2011	Mexico U20	14	(5)
2011	Mexico U23	2	(0)
Medal record
Representing Mexico
Winner	CONCACAF U-20 Championship	2011
Third place	FIFA U-20 World Cup	2011
- * Club domestic league appearances and goals as of 9 May 2024

Ulises Alejandro Dávila Plascencia (born 13 April 1991) is a Mexican professional footballer who last played as an attacking midfielder for A-League club Macarthur FC.

== Club career ==
=== Guadalajara ===
Born in Guadalajara, Jalisco, Dávila was champion with Guadalajara in the category 1990–91 in the National Youth Championship in July 2006, with a 1–0 win over Pachuca, where he scored the only goal. That same year, Chivas also won the Manchester United Premier Cup "Generation 1991", beating Arsenal by a score of 2–1. In the 2008–09 season, he was loaned to affiliate club Tapatio, scoring three goals in eighteen matches in the Primera División A.

He made his debut for Guadalajara in the Primera División on 29 August 2009, in a 2–2 draw against Pachuca. Dávila also featured in five matches in the Copa Libertadores tournament.

=== Chelsea ===
On 27 August 2011, it was announced that Dávila had signed for English club Chelsea, signing a five-year contract, making him the first Mexican to sign with Chelsea.

==== Loan to Vitesse ====
On 30 August 2011, it was announced that Dávila joined Dutch football club Vitesse Arnhem on loan for the 2011–12 season. He was given the number 24 jersey. He made his club debut against Roda JC Kerkrade on 17 September 2011, with the game ending in a 5–0 win for Vitesse. Unlike his teammate from Chelsea, Tomáš Kalas, Dávila struggled to get into the starting XI and had been an unused substitute for a number of games. Playing for their reserve side, he had more success, scoring three goals in three games. On 19 February 2012, once again returned onto the bench against FC Twente but was an unused sub, the game ended in a 1–4 loss for Vitesse. On 28 April 2012, again returned onto the bench against Excelsior but again was an unused sub, the game ended in a 3–2 win for Vitesse. Dávila spent the majority of his time at Vitesse with the reserve squad.

==== Loan to Sabadell ====
On 13 July 2012 CE Sabadell announced that Dávila will join them on loan for the 2012–13 season. On 29 September 2012, Dávila scored his first league goal against Guadalajara, winning the game 2–1. On 18 November Dávila scored a brace against Recreativo de Huelva, and also hit the post almost scoring his first hat trick, Sabadell won the game 5–2 away.

==== Loan to Córdoba ====
On the last day of the 2013 Summer transfer window, Chelsea confirmed that Dávila was having a medical at Córdoba CF of the Spanish Segunda División. Later on that day he secured his deal on a season-long loan.

On 23 June, he scored an equaliser in injury time away to UD Las Palmas in the second leg of the play-off final, earning Córdoba's promotion to La Liga for the first time in 42 years.

==== Loan to Vitória Setubal ====
On 23 January 2015, Dávila ended his loan with Tenerife to join the Portuguese side on loan for the rest of the season. On 3 August 2015, it was announced that Dávila will remain with Vitória for the 2015–16 season.

=== Santos Laguna ===
On 4 December 2015, Santos Laguna announced they had purchased Dávila from Chelsea and signed him to a three-year contract.

=== Delhi Dynamos ===
In December 2018, Dávila signed with Indian Super League side Delhi Dynamos, and scored his only goal on 17 February 2019, against Bengaluru FC in a 3–2 win.

=== Wellington Phoenix ===
In July 2019, Dávila signed with A-League side Wellington Phoenix on a two-year deal. Dávila secured a fourth goal in six starts with a goal from outside the box against Brisbane Roar on 23 November 2019. The goal proved vital in their 2–1 victory, Wellington's first win of the 2019–20 A-League season. Dávila helped the Phoenix to its best ever regular season finish, ending in third place for the League, before the team lost 0–1 to Perth Glory FC in their first game of the elimination finals. Dávila finished the season with 12 goals and five assists, winning the Johnny Warren Medal along with Miloš Ninković.

=== Macarthur FC ===
On 17 May it was announced that Dávila had signed a three-year deal to join Macarthur FC for the 2021–22 season. On 6 November 2021, Dávila was announced as the captain for the 2021–22 A-League Men season. On 24 June 2024, the club announced that they agreed a mutual termination of contract with Dávila. At the same time, Dávila was arrested for allegedly being involved in spot-fixing.

== International career ==
=== Youth ===
Dávila was part of the under-20 side that played the 2011 CONCACAF U-20 Championship, in which Mexico finished as champions. He also participated in the 2011 Toulon Tournament in France, where Mexico finished as fourth place losing to Italy in a penalty shoot-out. Dávila scored two goals during the 2011 Toulon Tournament, scoring against France and Hungary.

Dávila was part of the 20-man squad that participated in the 2011 FIFA U-20 World Cup in Colombia. Mexico would eventually finish third in the tournament by beating France 3–1, and he was able to score a goal against France.

=== Senior ===
Dávila received his first call up to the senior national team to play the 2011 Copa América, to replace one of the five players that were suspended for having disciplinary problems in Quito, Ecuador. He did not play in any of Mexico's matches.

== Personal life ==
In March 2020, Dávila's wife Lily Pacheco gave birth to a son. Lily died on 30 May 2022.

== Betting scandal ==
On 17 May 2024, Dávila along with two Macarthur FC teammates, Kearyn Baccus and Clayton Lewis, were arrested by New South Wales Police Force over an alleged spot fixing scandal. In October 2025, Dávila pleaded guilty and is due to be sentenced in December 2026.

== Career statistics ==
=== Club ===
As of 5 May 2024

Appearances and goals by club, season and competition
Club	Season	League			Cup (Note: Includes KNVB Cup, Copa del Rey, Taça da Liga, Copa MX and Australia Cup)		Continental		Others		Total	
Club	Season	Division	Apps	Goals	Apps	Goals	Apps	Goals	Apps	Goals	Apps	Goals
Tapatío (loan)	2008–09	Primera División A	17	3	—		—		—		17	3
QUINTERO FC	2009–10	Mexican Primera División	7	0	—		5 (Note: Appearances in Copa Libertadores)	0	—		12	0
QUINTERO FC	2010–11	Mexican Primera División	8	0	—		—		—		8	0
QUINTERO FC	Total		15	0	—		5	0	—		20	0
Vitesse (loan)	2011–12	Eredivisie	2	0	1	0	—		—		3	0
Sabadell (loan)	2012–13	Segunda División	35	4	2	1	—		—		37	5
Córdoba (loan)	2013–14	Segunda División	37	7	1	0	—		—		38	7
Tenerife (loan)	2014–15	Segunda División	10	1	1	0	—		—		11	1
Vitória (loan)	2014–15	Primeira Liga	11	0	3	0	—		—		14	0
Vitória (loan)	2015–16	Primeira Liga	3	0	1	0	—		—		4	0
Vitória (loan)	Total		14	0	4	0	—		—		18	0
Santos Laguna	2015–16	Liga MX	15	2	—		4 (Note: Appearances in CONCACAF Champions League)	1	—		19	3
Santos Laguna	2016–17	Liga MX	19	1	10	3	—		—		29	4
Santos Laguna	2017–18	Liga MX	4	0	4	0	—		—		8	0
Santos Laguna	Total		38	3	14	3	4	1	—		56	7
Delhi Dynamos	2018–19	Indian Super League	6	1	—		—		—		6	1
Wellington Phoenix	2019–20	A-League	26	12	—		—		1 (Note: Appearance in A-League Finals)	0	27	12
Wellington Phoenix	2020–21	A-League	23	7	—		—		—		23	7
Wellington Phoenix	Total		49	19	—		—		1	0	50	19
Macarthur FC	2021–22	A-League	23	7	1	0	—		—		24	7
Macarthur FC	2022–23	A-League	13	3	3	3	—		—		16	6
Macarthur FC	2023–24	A-League	25	9	1	0	6 (Note: Appearances in AFC Cup)	4	—		32	13
Macarthur FC	Total		61	19	5	3	6	4	—		72	26
Career total			284	57	28	7	15	5	1	0	328	69

== Honours ==
Guadalajara

- Copa Libertadores runner-up: 2010

Santos Laguna

- Liga MX: Clausura 2018

Macarthur FC

- Australia Cup: 2022

Mexico U20

- CONCACAF U-20 Championship: 2011

Individual

- A-League Player of the Month: December 2019
- A-League PFA Team of the Season: 2019–20, 2020–21, 2021–22
- Johnny Warren Medal: 2020–21
- Mark Viduka Medal: 2022
