= Oliver Jones (soccer) =

English footballer (born 2003)

Personal information
- Full name: Oliver James Jones
- Date of birth: 6 February 2003 (age 23)
- Place of birth: Goodmayes, England
- Height: 1.90 m (6 ft 3 in)
- Position: Central defender

Team information
- Current team: Randers
- Number: 5

Youth career
- Hakoah Sydney City East

Senior career*
Years	Team	Apps	(Gls)
2021–2024	Northbridge Bulls	49	(2)
2022–2025	Macarthur FC	21	(0)
2025–	Randers	2	(0)
- * Club domestic league appearances and goals as of 22 April 2025

Oliver James Jones (born 6 February 2003) is an English professional footballer who plays as a central defender for Randers FC. He has previously played for Macarthur FC.

== Club career ==
=== Macarthur FC ===
In November 2022, Jones joined A-League Men club Macarthur FC's senior side, signing a one-year scholarship contract. While he was still playing for Macarthur FC's reserve side, Northbridge Bulls, he had made his professional debut on 8 December 2021 in a FFA Cup match against Sydney FC. In April 2023, he signed a two-year extension until the end of the 2024–25 A-League Men season. In January 2025, he signed another contract extension, to keep him at the club until the end of the 2027–28 A-League Men season. A few weeks after this extension, he was sold by Macarthur FC to a European club, with them receiving a fee with bonuses and onsell percentage.

=== Randers FC ===
In January 2025, Jones joined Danish club Randers FC, signing a five-year deal including a transfer fee paid to Macarthur FC, believed to be about $400,000.
