= Yianni Nicolaou =

Australian footballer

Personal information
- Date of birth: 5 January 2000 (age 26)
- Place of birth: Hurstville, Australia
- Height: 1.83 m (6 ft 0 in)
- Position: Defender

Youth career
- –2018: Marconi Stallions

Senior career*
Years	Team	Apps	(Gls)
2018–2019	Marconi Stallions	28	(0)
2019–2020	Salford City	0	(0)
2019	→ Buxton (loan)	3	(0)
2019	→ Runcorn Linnets (loan)	1	(0)
2020–2021	Macarthur FC	0	(0)
2021	Northbridge Bulls	14	(0)
2022–2023	APIA Leichhardt	51	(4)
2023–2025	Macarthur FC	21	(0)
2025–2026	Sutherland Sharks	33	(3)
- * Club domestic league appearances and goals as of 15 September 2026

Yianni Nicolaou (born 5 January 2000) is an Australian professional soccer player who last played as a defender for Sutherland Sharks.

== Career ==
=== Early career ===
Born in Australia of Greek descent, Nicolaou was a youth product of Marconi during which he trialed in Scotland and England after his breakthrough to the first-team in 2018. He joined Salford City in August 2019, after a successful trial that led him to sign a one-year contract with an option to extend. Nicolaou eventually returned to Australia after two loan spells with Buxton and Runcorn Linnets.

=== Macarthur FC ===
He signed for a season with Northbridge Bulls, the reserve side of Macarthur FC, on 20 November 2020, before transferring to APIA Leichhardt where he helped his side win the 2023 National Premier Leagues NSW premiership in his second season.

Nicolaou re-signed for Macarthur FC on 12 September 2023, returning to the first team after spending two seasons in state league football. On 31 January 2024, Nicolaou extended his contract for one year with the Bulls.
