= 2024 Australia Cup =

2024 season of Australia's national knockout soccer competition

Tournament details
- Country: Australia; New Zealand
- Dates: 9 February – 29 September 2024
- Teams: 759 (qualifying competition); 32 (main competition)

Final positions
- Champions: Macarthur FC (2nd title)
- Runners-up: Melbourne Victory
- AFC Champions League Two: Macarthur FC

Tournament statistics
- Matches played: 31
- Goals scored: 114 (3.68 per match)
- Attendance: 73,650 (2,376 per match)
- Top goal scorer: Nishan Velupillay (5 goals)

The 2024 Australia Cup was the 11th season of the Australia Cup, the main national soccer knockout cup competition in Australia. This edition was the third under the new name of the "Australia Cup" following the renaming of Football Federation Australia to Football Australia. Thirty-two teams contested the competition proper.

Sydney FC were the defending champions, but were eliminated by Oakleigh Cannons in the Round of 32.

Macarthur FC won its second Australia Cup after defeating Melbourne Victory in the final. Macarthur FC qualified to the group stage of the AFC's 2025–26 AFC Champions League Two competition.

== Round and dates ==
For the first time in the competition's history, the draws for the round of 16, quarter-finals and semi-finals are combined.

Round	Draw date	Match dates	Number of fixtures	Teams	New entries this round
Preliminary rounds	Various	9 February–24 July	737	759 → 32	751
Round of 32	19 June	30 July–7 August	16	32 → 16	8
Round of 16	7 August	25–28 August	8	16 → 8	None
Quarter-finals	7 August	11–14 September	4	8 → 4	None
Semi-finals	7 August	21–22 September	2	4 → 2	None
Final	—	29 September	1	2 → 1	None

== Teams ==
A total of 32 teams will participate in the 2024 Australia Cup competition proper.

A-League Men clubs represent the highest level in the Australian league system, whereas Member Federation clubs come from level 2 and below.

A-League Men clubs
Adelaide United	Central Coast Mariners	Macarthur FC	Melbourne City
Melbourne Victory	Newcastle Jets	Perth Glory	Sydney FC
Wellington Phoenix	Western Sydney Wanderers		
Member federation clubs
(Australian Capital Territory) O'Connor Knights (2)	(New South Wales) APIA Leichhardt (2)	(New South Wales) Blacktown City (2)	(New South Wales) NWS Spirit (2)
(New South Wales) Rockdale Ilinden (2)	(New South Wales) Edgeworth FC (2)	(New South Wales) Lambton Jaffas (2)	(Northern Territory) Darwin Hearts (2)
(Queensland) Brisbane City (2)	(Queensland) Lions FC (2)	(Queensland) Moreton City Excelsior (2)	(Queensland) Olympic FC (2)
(South Australia) Campbelltown City (2)	(South Australia) Modbury Jets (2)	(Tasmania) Glenorchy Knights (2)	(Victoria (state)) Heidelberg United (2)
(Victoria (state)) Hume City (2)	(Victoria (state)) Melbourne Srbija (4)	(Victoria (state)) Oakleigh Cannons (2)	(Victoria (state)) South Melbourne (2)
(Western Australia) Olympic Kingsway (2)	(Western Australia) Perth RedStar (2)		

== Preliminary rounds ==
Member federation teams competed in various state-based preliminary rounds to win one of 22 places in the competition proper (at the Round of 32). All Australian clubs (other than youth teams associated with A-League franchises) were eligible to enter the qualifying process through their respective member federation; however, only one team per club was permitted entry into the competition. The preliminary rounds operated within a consistent national structure whereby club entry into the competition is staggered in each state/territory, determined by what level the club sits at in the Australian soccer league system. This ultimately lead to round 7, with the winning clubs from that round entering directly into the round of 32. Slot allocations were the same as the previous year.

The top eight placed A-League Men clubs from the 2023–24 A-League Men season gained automatic qualification to the Round of 32. The remaining four teams entered a play-off series to determine the remaining two positions.

Federation	Associated competition	Round of 32 qualifiers
Football Australia	A-League Men	10
Capital Football (ACT)	Federation Cup (ACT)	1
Football NSW	Waratah Cup	4
Northern NSW Football	Northern NSW State Cup	2
Football Northern Territory	NT Australia Cup Final	1
Football Queensland	Kappa Queensland Cup	4
Football South Australia	Federation Cup (SA)	2
Football Tasmania	Milan Lakoseljac Cup	1
Football Victoria	Dockerty Cup	5
Football West (WA)	State Cup	2

== Bracket ==
Round of 32
Moreton City Excelsior	5
Campbelltown City	1
Perth Glory (a.e.t.)	5
Melbourne City	4
NWS Spirit	3
Glenorchy Knights	0
Lambton Jaffas	1
Melbourne Victory	4
Olympic Kingsway	4
Edgeworth Eagles	1
Blacktown City	2
Adelaide United (a.e.t.)	3
Perth RedStar	1
Lions FC	4
Brisbane City	1
Western Sydney Wanderers	2
Darwin Hearts	0
Hume City	6
Melbourne Srbija (p)	1 (4)
Modbury Jets	1 (1)
South Melbourne	1
Wellington Phoenix	0
Olympic FC (a.e.t.)	1
APIA Leichhardt	0
Oakleigh Cannons	3
Sydney FC	1
Heidelberg United (a.e.t.)	3
Central Coast Mariners	1
Rockdale Ilinden	1
Newcastle Jets	2
O'Connor Knights	1
Macarthur FC	2

Round of 16
Moreton City Excelsior	3
Perth Glory	2
NWS Spirit	0
Melbourne Victory	4
Olympic Kingsway	2
Adelaide United	3
Lions FC	0
Western Sydney Wanderers	4
Hume City	1
Melbourne Srbija	0
South Melbourne (a.e.t.)	3
Olympic FC	2
Oakleigh Cannons (p)	1 (4)
Heidelberg United	1 (1)
Newcastle Jets	3
Macarthur FC	4

Quarter-finals
Moreton City Excelsior	0
Melbourne Victory	4
Adelaide United (a.e.t.)	2
Western Sydney Wanderers	1
Hume City	2
South Melbourne (a.e.t.)	3
Oakleigh Cannons	0
Macarthur FC	1

Semi-finals
Melbourne Victory	1
Adelaide United	0
South Melbourne	0
Macarthur FC	1

Final
Melbourne Victory	0
Macarthur FC	1

== Round of 32 ==
The draw took place on 19 June. The lowest ranked side that qualified for this round was Melbourne Srbija. They were the only level 4 team left in the competition.

Times are AEST (UTC+10) as listed by Football Australia (local times, if different, are in parentheses).

30 July 2024	Moreton City Excelsior (2)	5–1	Campbelltown City (2)	Brisbane
19:00	Gwynn-Jones 6'; Centofanti 21' (o.g.); Walters 52', 58'; Kierpal 64'	Report	Marino 37'	Stadium: Wolter Park; Attendance: 869; Referee: Alireza Faghani

30 July 2024	Oakleigh Cannons (2)	3–1	Sydney FC (1)	Melbourne
19:30	Sinclair 14'; Kasumovic 38'; Wellsmore 74'	Report	Ouahim 25' (pen.)	Stadium: The Home of the Matildas; Attendance: 1,200; Referee: Shaun Evans

30 July 2024	O'Connor Knights (2)	1–2	Macarthur FC (1)	Canberra
19:30	Manda 57'	Report	Hollman 62'; Brattan 79'	Stadium: GIO Stadium Canberra; Attendance: 3,210; Referee: Sam Kelly

30 July 2024	Darwin Hearts (2)	0–6	Hume City (2)	Darwin
19:30 (19:00 ACST)		Report	Gulevski 59', 83'; Platt 64'; Abdallah 67'; McFarlane 73'; Minucci 90+1' (o.g.)	Stadium: Darwin Football Stadium; Attendance: 1,443; Referee: Rebecca Durcau

31 July 2024	Blacktown City (2)	2–3 (a.e.t.)	Adelaide United (1)	Sydney
19:30	Major 71'; Awaritefe 119'	Report	Mauk 35'; Dukuly 97'; Jovanovic 107'	Stadium: Landen Stadium; Attendance: 1,531; Referee: Jack Morgan

31 July 2024	Brisbane City (2)	1–2	Western Sydney Wanderers (1)	Brisbane
19:30	Maieroni 78'	Report	Cleur 4'; Badolato 7'	Stadium: Imperial Corp Stadium; Attendance: 1,794; Referee: Casey Reibelt

31 July 2024	Rockdale Ilinden (2)	1–2	Newcastle Jets (1)	Sydney
19:30	Antoniou 30'	Report	Vidic 11', 45+3'	Stadium: Rockdale Ilinden Sports Centre; Attendance: 1,797; Referee: Ben Abraham

31 July 2024	Perth RedStar (2)	1–4	Lions FC (2)	Perth
20:30 (18:30 AWST)	George 30'	Report	Pengelly 42'; Minett 45+5'; Broderick 58'; Fiechtner 71'	Stadium: Percy Doyle Reserve; Attendance: 616; Referee: Daniel Cook

3 August 2024	Perth Glory (1)	5–4 (a.e.t.)	Melbourne City (1)	Perth
19:30 (17:30 AWST)	Faisal 3'; Taggart 47'; Blair 74', 115'; Bugarija 88'	Report	Caputo 36'; Politidis 52'; Nabbout 64'; Schreiber 69'	Stadium: Sam Kerr Football Centre; Attendance: 2,015; Referee: Alireza Faghani

6 August 2024	Lambton Jaffas (2)	1–4	Melbourne Victory (1)	Newcastle
19:30	Bond 36'	Report	Fornaroli 9'; Lee 27'; Velupillay 45+2', 51'	Stadium: Jack McLaughlin Oval; Attendance: 1,172; Referee: Tim Danaskos

6 August 2024	South Melbourne (2)	1–0	Wellington Phoenix (1)	Melbourne
19:30	Sawyer 4'	Report		Stadium: Lakeside Stadium; Attendance: 4,196; Referee: Jonathon Barreiro

6 August 2024	Melbourne Srbija (4)	1–1 (a.e.t.) (4–1 p)	Modbury Jets (2)	Melbourne
19:30	Mi. Ilic 55'	Report	Schimizzi 4'	Stadium: The Home of the Matildas; Attendance: 1,069; Referee: Zijad Ahmetovic
	Penalties
	Ma. Ilic (penalty scored); Mi. Ilic (penalty scored); Papadimitriou (penalty scored); Ichigi (penalty scored)		(penalty missed) Francesca; (penalty scored) Kirk; (penalty missed) McCabe

6 August 2024	Olympic Kingsway (2)	4–1	Edgeworth FC (2)	Perth
20:30 (18:30 AWST)	Hobson 35'; Oppedisano 64' (o.g.); Oxborrow 80'; Knowles 83'	Report	Goodman 6'	Stadium: Kingsway Reserve; Attendance: 1,405; Referee: Daniel Elder

7 August 2024	Heidelberg United (2)	3–1 (a.e.t.)	Central Coast Mariners (1)	Melbourne
19:30	Pin 43' (pen.), 104'; Ellis 120+1'	Report	Doka 52'	Stadium: Olympic Village; Attendance: 2,077; Referee: Alex King

7 August 2024	NWS Spirit (2)	3–0	Glenorchy Knights (2)	Sydney
19:30	Konestabo 27'; Darko 32'; Cianci 61'	Report		Stadium: Christie Park; Attendance: 624; Referee: Nathan Shakespear

7 August 2024	Olympic FC (2)	1–0 (a.e.t.)	APIA Leichhardt (2)	Brisbane
19:30	Farr 96'	Report		Stadium: Goodwin Park; Attendance: 1,400; Referee: Adam Kersey

== Round of 16 ==
The draw for all remaining rounds took place on 7 August. The lowest ranked side that qualified for this round was Melbourne Srbija. They were the only level 4 team left in the competition.

Times are AEST (UTC+10) as listed by Football Australia (local times, if different, are in parentheses).

25 August 2024	Newcastle Jets (1)	3–4	Macarthur FC (1)	Maitland
15:00	Grozos 14' (pen.); Natta 20'; Aquilina 68'	Report	Germain 48', 54'; Jakoliš 71', 75'	Stadium: Maitland Sportsground; Attendance: 2,971; Referee: Ben Abraham

25 August 2024	South Melbourne (2)	3–2 (a.e.t.)	Olympic FC (2)	Melbourne
17:30	Jankovic 26', 91'; Archibald 90'	Report	Farr 36'; Dunn 42'	Stadium: Lakeside Stadium; Attendance: 2,572; Referee: Jonathan Barreiro

27 August 2024	Hume City (2)	1–0	Melbourne Srbija (4)	Melbourne
19:30	Abdallah 55'	Report		Stadium: Hume City Stadium; Attendance: 3,163; Referee: Tim Danaskos

27 August 2024	Lions FC (2)	0–4	Western Sydney Wanderers (1)	Brisbane
19:30		Report	Milanovic 23'; Sapsford 53'; Antonsson 76'; Younis 84'	Stadium: Luxury Paints Stadium; Attendance: 1,853; Referee: Daniel Elder

27 August 2024	Olympic Kingsway (2)	2–3	Adelaide United (1)	Perth
20:30 (18:30 AWST)	Boland 38', 84' (pen.)	Report	Ayoubi 11'; O'Connell 49' (o.g.); Jovanovic 71'	Stadium: Kingsway Reserve; Attendance: 1,950; Referee: Adam Bavcar

28 August 2024	NWS Spirit (2)	0–4	Melbourne Victory (1)	Sydney
19:30		Report	Teague 29'; Velupillay 45', 67'; Vergos 57'	Stadium: Christie Park; Attendance: 1,854; Referee: Daniel Cook

28 August 2024	Oakleigh Cannons (2)	1–1 (a.e.t.) (4–1 p)	Heidelberg United (2)	Melbourne
19:30	Hall 55'	Report	Ellis 88' (pen.)	Stadium: The Home of the Matildas; Attendance: 1,500; Referee: Shaun Evans
	Penalties
	Salmon (penalty scored); McGilp (penalty scored); Kubilay (penalty scored); Holmes (penalty scored)		(penalty missed) Collins; (penalty scored) Fetahagic; (penalty missed) Pin

28 August 2024	Moreton City Excelsior (2)	3–2	Perth Glory (1)	Brisbane
19:30	Walters 14'; Holliday 31'; Scott 85'	Report	Lisolajski 2'; Muir 10'	Stadium: Perry Park; Attendance: 1,490; Referee: Adam Kersey

== Quarter-finals ==
The lowest ranked sides that qualified for this round were Hume City, Moreton City Excelsior, Oakleigh Cannons and South Melbourne. They were the only level 2 teams left in the competition.

Times are AEST (UTC+10) as listed by Football Australia (local times, if different, are in parentheses).

11 September 2024	Hume City (2)	2–3 (a.e.t.)	South Melbourne (2)	Melbourne
19:30	Bingham 12'; Weier 75'	Report	Sawyer 49' (pen.); Mikkola 73'; Lampard 115'	Stadium: Hume City Stadium; Attendance: 1,758; Referee: Tim Danaskos

12 September 2024	Adelaide United (1)	2–1 (a.e.t.)	Western Sydney Wanderers (1)	Adelaide
19:30 (19:00 ACST)	Ayoubi 9'; Kitto 93'	Report	Milanovic 68'	Stadium: ServiceFM Stadium; Attendance: 2,906; Referee: Shaun Evans

14 September 2024	Oakleigh Cannons (2)	0–1	Macarthur FC (1)	Melbourne
15:00		Report	Germain 3'	Stadium: The Home of the Matildas; Attendance: 807; Referee: Jack Morgan

14 September 2024	Moreton City Excelsior (2)	0–4	Melbourne Victory (1)	Brisbane
18:00		Report	Vergos 10', 20'; Bos 31'; Velupillay 66'	Stadium: Perry Park; Attendance: 1,850; Referee: Jonathan Barreiro

== Semi-finals ==
The lowest ranked side that qualified for this round was South Melbourne. They were the only level 2 team left in the competition.

21 September 2024	Melbourne Victory (1)	1–0	Adelaide United (1)	Melbourne
19:30 AEST	Valadon 88'	Report		Stadium: AAMI Park; Attendance: 5,131; Referee: Alex King

22 September 2024	South Melbourne (2)	0–1	Macarthur FC (1)	Melbourne
18:00 AEST		Report	Germain 84' (pen.)	Stadium: Lakeside Stadium; Attendance: 4,138; Referee: Ben Abraham

== Final ==
29 September 2024
19:10 AEST

Melbourne Victory (1)	0–1	Macarthur FC (1)
	Report	Jakoliš 58'

AAMI Park, Melbourne
Attendance: 13,289
Referee: Jonathan Barreiro

== Individual honours ==
The recipient of the Michael Cockerill Medal to recognise the tournament's standout National Premier Leagues performer was Liam Boland from Olympic Kingsway. Filip Kurto from Macarthur FC won the Mark Viduka Medal for the player of the match in the final.

== Top goalscorers ==
As of 22 September 2024

Rank	Player	Club	Goals
1	(Australia) Nishan Velupillay	Melbourne Victory	5
2	(France) Valère Germain	Macarthur FC	4
3	(Croatia) Marin Jakoliš	Macarthur FC	3
3	(Greece) Nikos Vergos	Melbourne Victory	3
3	(Australia) Marquez Walters	Moreton City Excelsior	3
6	13 Players	Various	2

Note: Goals scored in preliminary rounds not included.
