= List of Macarthur FC players =

Macarthur Football Club, an association football club based in South Western Sydney, Sydney, was founded in 2017 as Macarthur South West United. They were one of the two expansion clubs admitted into the A-League Men in 2020, having played one friendly match in the 2018–19 season. The club's name changed to Macarthur FC when their crest and colours were announced as club. The club's first team has competed in the A-League Men, and all players who have played at least one such match are listed below.

Lachlan Rose holds the record for the greatest number of appearances for Macarthur FC. Between 2020 and 2022 the Australian midfielder played 64 times for the club. The club's goalscoring record is held by Matt Derbyshire, who scored 14 goals in all competitions between 2020 and 2021.

== Key ==
- The list is ordered first by date of debut, and then if necessary in alphabetical order.
- Appearances as a substitute are included.
- Statistics are correct up to and including the match played on 16 March 2024. Where a player left the club permanently after this date, his statistics are updated to his date of leaving.

Positions key
GK	Goalkeeper
DF	Defender
MF	Midfielder
FW	Forward

Nationality
Unless otherwise noted, the nationality of a player is determined by the country/countries which he has played for, or if said person has not played international football, their country of birth.
Position
Playing positions are listed according to the tactical formations that were employed at the time.
Club career
Club career is defined as the first and last calendar years in which the player appeared for the club in any of the competitions listed below.
Total appearances and Total goals
Total appearances and goals comprise those in the A-League Men regular season and finals series, Australia Cup and AFC Cup.

== Players ==
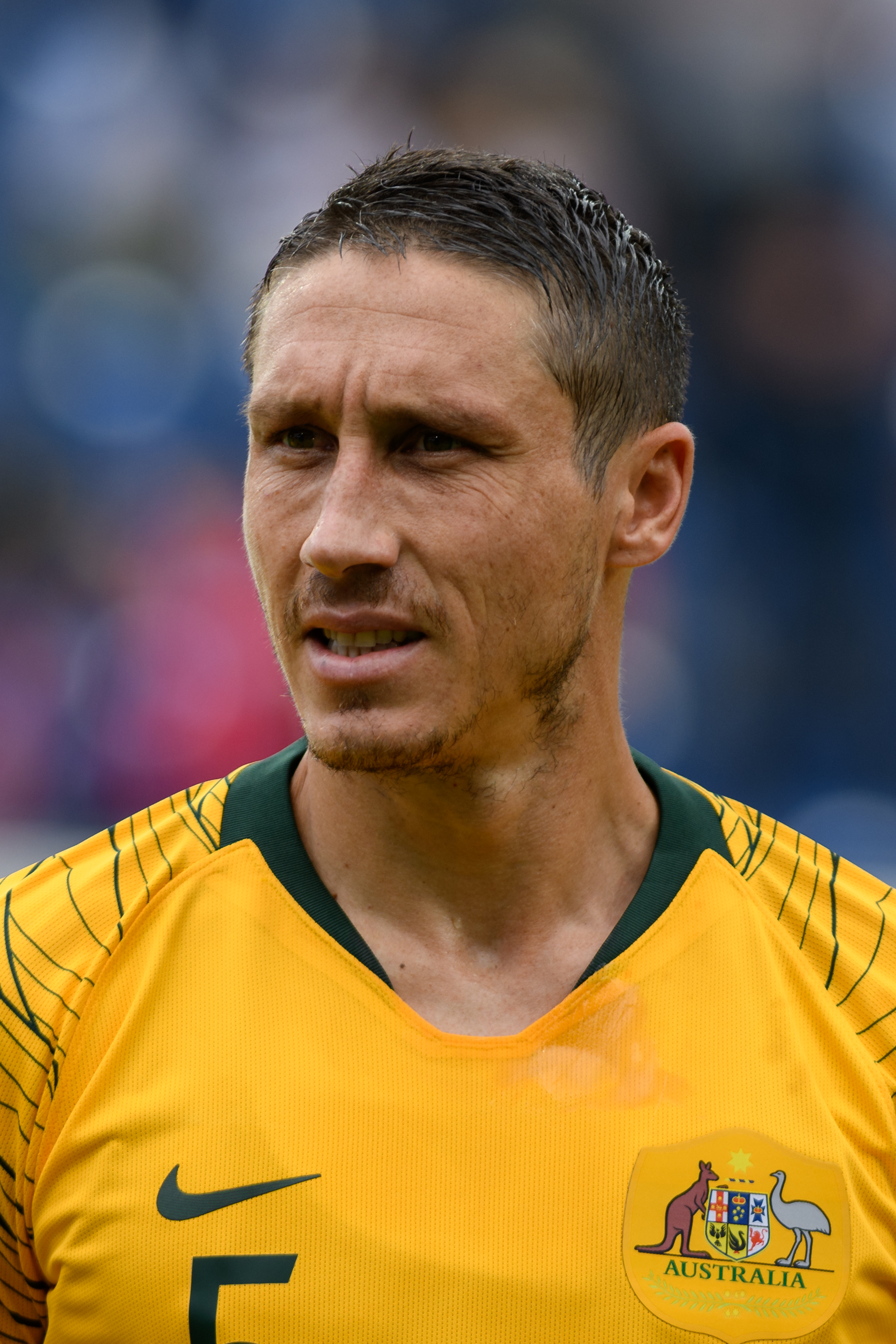
Mark Milligan was the club's inaugural captain for the 2020–21 season.

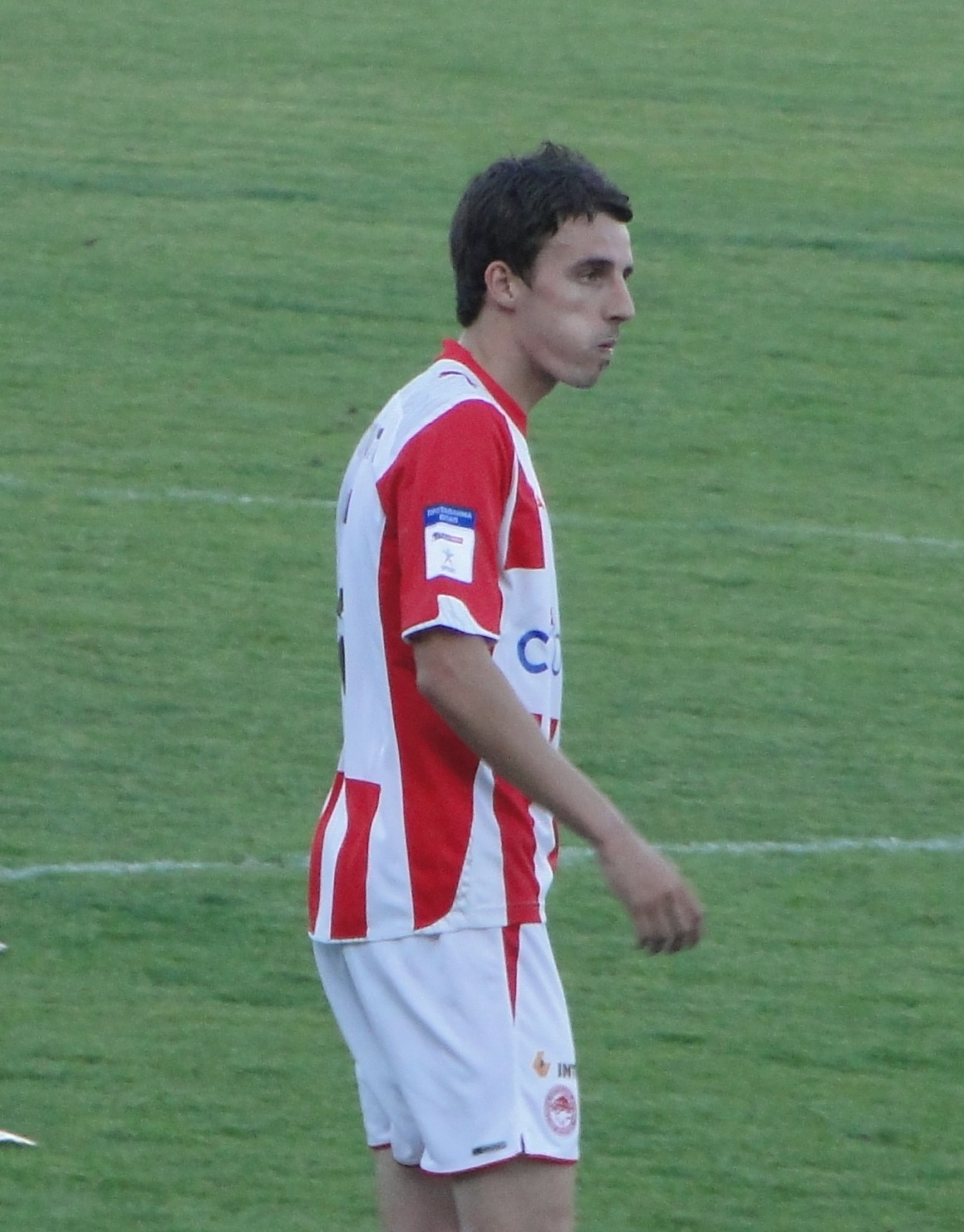
Matt Derbyshire scored a hat-trick in Macarthur's first home win in the A-League Men.

Players highlighted in bold are still actively playing at Macarthur FC.

List of Macarthur FC players
Player	Nationality	Pos	Club career	Starts	Subs	Total	Goals
Player	Nationality	Pos	Club career	Appearances			Goals
Beñat	Spain	MF	2020–2021	21	3	24	0
Matt Derbyshire	England	FW	2020–2021	26	1	27	14
Adam Federici	Australia	GK	2020–2021	28	0	28	0
Antony Golec	Australia	DF	2020–2021	5	13	18	0
Ivan Franjic	Australia	DF	2020–2021	15	4	19	0
Denis Genreau	Australia	DF	2020–2021	22	1	23	1
**Jake Hollman**	Australia	MF	2020–	47	34	81	10
Aleksandar Jovanovic	Australia	DF	2020–2022	30	4	34	2
James Meredith	Australia	DF	2020–2022	31	11	42	3
Mark Milligan	Australia	MF	2020–2021	27	0	27	3
Moudi Najjar	Australia	FW	2020–2023	21	19	40	3
Loïc Puyo	France	MF	2020–2021	16	5	21	2
**Lachlan Rose**	Australia	MF	2020–	44	46	90	18
Markel Susaeta	Spain	FW	2020–2021	19	4	23	5
Aleksandar Šušnjar	Australia	DF	2020–2023	48	7	53	2
Liam Rose	Australia	MF	2021–2022	10	25	35	0
Michael Ruhs	Australia	MF	2021–2022	6	23	29	3
Antonis Martis	Cyprus	MF	2021–2022	9	15	24	0
Tommy Oar	Australia	FW	2021–2022	29	12	41	2
**Charles M'Mombwa**	Tanzania	FW	2021–	38	35	73	3
Jake McGing	Australia	DF	2021–2023	35	12	47	2
Milislav Popovic	Australia	DF	2021	1	6	7	0
Walter Scott	Australia	DF	2021	0	1	1	0
Kyle Cimenti	Australia	FW	2021	0	1	1	0
**Ulises Dávila**	Mexico	MF	2021–	65	3	68	25
**Daniel De Silva**	Australia	MF	2021–	38	9	47	4
Jordon Mutch	England	MF	2021–2022	15	7	22	0
Craig Noone	England	FW	2021–2023	36	10	46	5
Nicholas Suman	Australia	GK	2021–2023	7	2	9	0
**Tomislav Uskok**	Australia	DF	2021–	77	2	79	5
**Filip Kurto**	Poland	GK	2021–	80	0	80	0
Tomi Juric	Australia	FW	2021–2022	0	8	8	1
Al Hassan Toure	Australia	FW	2021–2023	26	24	50	10
**Diego Bonilla**	Australia	FW	2021–	0	1	1	0
**Oliver Jones**	Australia	MF	2021–	7	11	18	0
Jack Mcloughlin	Australia	MF	2021	1	0	1	0
Lachlan Sepping	Australia	MF	2021	0	1	1	0
Adrian Mariappa	Jamaica	DF	2021–2022	17	2	19	3
Apostolos Giannou	Australia	FW	2022–	18	2	20	3
Rory Jordan	Australia	MF	2022	0	1	1	0
Daniel Arzani	Australia	MF	2022–2023	16	8	24	4
**Jonathan Aspropotamitis**	Australia	DF	2022–	37	3	40	2
**Kearyn Baccus**	Australia	MF	2022–	43	6	49	2
Anthony Carter	Australia	FW	2022–2023	5	10	15	2
**Jed Drew**	Australia	FW	2022–	26	29	55	8
**Matthew Millar**	Australia	DF	2022–	38	4	42	10
**Jerry Skotadis**	Australia	MF	2022–	11	24	35	1
**Ivan Vujica**	Australia	DF	2022–	55	1	56	0
Jesper Webber	Australia	FW	2022–2023	1	10	11	0
Bachana Arabuli	Georgia	FW	2022–2023	11	4	15	5
**Ali Auglah**	Australia	FW	2023–	5	28	33	3
**Joel Bertolissio**	Australia	MF	2023–	0	4	4	0
**Rhys Youlley**	Australia	FW	2023–	2	1	3	0
Jason Romero	United States	FW	2023	3	2	5	1
Isaac Hover	Australia	DF	2023	7	1	8	0
**Alexander Robinson**	Australia	GK	2023–	1	0	1	0
**Raphael Borges Rodrigues**	Australia	MF	2023–	24	6	30	6
**Valère Germain**	France	FW	2023–	30	0	30	15
**Clayton Lewis**	New Zealand	MF	2023–	26	2	28	0
**Matthew Jurman**	Australia	DF	2023–	19	0	19	0
**Yianni Nicolaou**	Australia	DF	2023–	18	4	22	0
**Danijel Nizic**	Australia	GK	2023–	3	0	3	0
**Kristian Popovic**	Australia	MF	2023–	0	6	6	0
**Kealey Adamson**	Australia	DF	2024–	9	2	11	0
**Bernardo Oliveira**	Australia	FW	2024–	7	5	10	3
**Ariath Piol**	Australia	FW	2024–	0	2	2	0
**Tommy Smith**	New Zealand	DF	2024–	2	3	5	0

== Captains ==
Two players have captained Macarthur FC since it was founded as Macarthur South West United in 2017, first being Mark Milligan, who captained the team until he retired in 2021. The club's longest-serving captain is Mark Milligan, who captained the club for one year between 2020 and 2021. The current captain is Ulises Dávila, who took over from Mark Milligan in 2021.

Years	Captain
2020–2021	Mark Milligan (AUS)
2021–	Ulises Dávila (MEX)
