= List of Macarthur FC records and statistics =

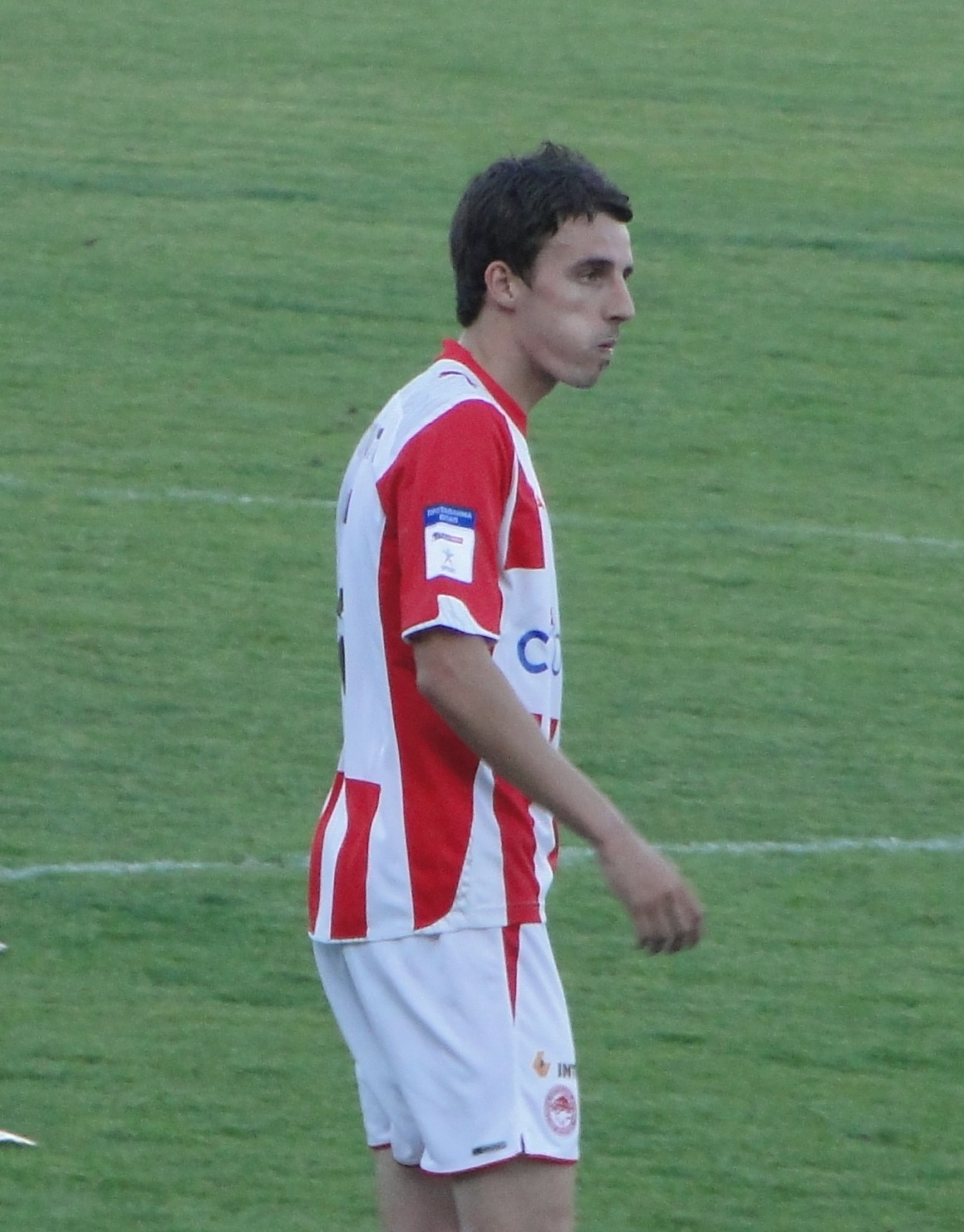
Matt Derbyshire is the sixthall-time goalscorer for Macarthur FC.

Macarthur Football Club is an Australian professional association football club based in Oran Park, Sydney. The club was formed in 2017 as Macarthur South West United before being renamed as Macarthur FC in 2019.

The list encompasses the honours won by Macarthur FC, records set by the club, their managers and their players. The player records section itemises the club's leading goalscorers and those who have made most appearances in first-team competitions. It also records notable achievements by Macarthur FC players on the international stage. Attendance records at Campbelltown are also included.

Macarthur FC has won one top-flight title that being the Australia Cup in 2022. The club's record appearance maker is Filip Kurto, who has currently made 116 appearances between 2021 to the present. Valère Germain is Macarthur FC's record goalscorer, scoring 28 goals in total.

All figures are correct as of 28 October 2025

== Honours ==
=== Domestic ===
- Australia Cup

Winners (2): 2022, 2024

== Player records ==
=== Appearances ===
- Most A-League Men appearances: Filip Kurto, 116
- Youngest first-team player: Oliver Randazzo, 17 years, 186 days (against Newcastle Jets, Australia Cup, 25 August 2024)
- Oldest first-team player: Adam Federici, 36 years, 140 days (against Melbourne City, A-League, 20 June 2021)
- Most consecutive appearances: Filip Kurto, 56 (from 12 November 2023 to 14 March 2025)

==== Most appearances ====
Competitive matches only, includes appearances as substitute. Numbers in brackets indicate goals scored.

#	Name	Years	A-League Men		Australia Cup	AFC Cup	Total
#	Name	Years	Regular season	Finals series	Australia Cup	AFC Cup	Total
1	(Poland) Filip Kurto	2021–	102 (0)	1 (0)	13 (0)	8 (0)	124 (0)
2	(Australia) Tomislav Uskok	2021–	93 (7)	1 (0)	16 (0)	9 (4)	119 (11)
3	(Australia) Jake Hollman	2020–2025	95 (11)	2 (0)	9 (3)	6 (2)	112 (16)
4	(Australia) Lachlan Rose	2020–2024	81 (9)	2 (0)	9 (7)	6 (3)	98 (19)
5	(Australia) Ivan Vujica	2022–2025	74 (0)	1 (0)	11 (0)	5 (0)	91 (0)
6	(Australia) Jed Drew	2022–2025	60 (10)	1 (0)	9 (1)	8 (4)	78 (15)
7	(Tanzania) Charles M'Mombwa	2020–2024	60 (1)	2 (1)	8 (1)	5 (0)	75 (3)
8	(Mexico) Ulises Dávila	2021–2024	60 (19)	1 (0)	5 (3)	6 (4)	72 (26)
9	(Australia) Daniel De Silva	2021–2025	61 (4)	1 (0)	5 (1)	4 (1)	71 (6)
10	(Australia) Liam Rose	2020–2022; 2024–	51 (1)	2 (0)	6 (0)	3 (0)	62 (1)

=== Goalscorers ===
- Most goals in a match:
  - Matt Derbyshire, 3 goals (against Adelaide United, A-League, 12 February 2021)
  - Ulises Dávila, 3 goals (against Western United, A-League Men, 12 January 2024)
  - Valère Germain, 3 goals (against Western Sydney Wanderers, A-League Men, 4 February 2024)
- Youngest goalscorer: Michael Ruhs, 18 years, 266 days (against Melbourne City, A-League, 24 April 2021)
- Oldest goalscorer: Mark Milligan, 35 years, 300 days (against Western United, A-League, 31 May 2021)

==== Top goalscorers ====
Valère Germain is the all-time top goalscorer for Macarthur FC.

Competitive matches only. Numbers in brackets indicate appearances made.

#	Name	Years	A-League Men		Australia Cup	AFC Cup	Total
#	Name	Years	Regular season	Finals series	Australia Cup	AFC Cup	Total
1	(France) Valère Germain	2023–2025	19 (44)	0 (1)	4 (5)	4 (7)	28 (57)
2	(Mexico) Ulises Dávila	2021–2024	19 (60)	0 (1)	3 (5)	4 (6)	26 (72)
3	(Australia) Lachlan Rose	2020–2024	9 (81)	0 (2)	7 (9)	3 (6)	19 (98)
4	(Australia) Jake Hollman	2020–2025	11 (95)	0 (2)	3 (9)	2 (6)	16 (112)
5	(Australia) Jed Drew	2022–2025	10 (60)	0 (1)	1 (9)	4 (8)	15 (78)
6	(England) Matt Derbyshire	2020–2021	14 (25)	0 (2)	0 (0)	0 (0)	14 (27)
7	(Croatia) Marin Jakoliš	2024–2025	10 (26)	0 (0)	3 (5)	0 (0)	13 (31)
8	(Australia) Matthew Millar	2022–2024	10 (34)	0 (1)	0 (4)	1 (5)	11 (44)
9	(Australia) Al Hassan Toure	2021–2023	5 (45)	0 (0)	5 (5)	0 (0)	10 (50)
10	(Australia) Tomislav Uskok	2021–	5 (93)	0 (1)	0 (16)	4 (9)	9 (119)

=== International ===
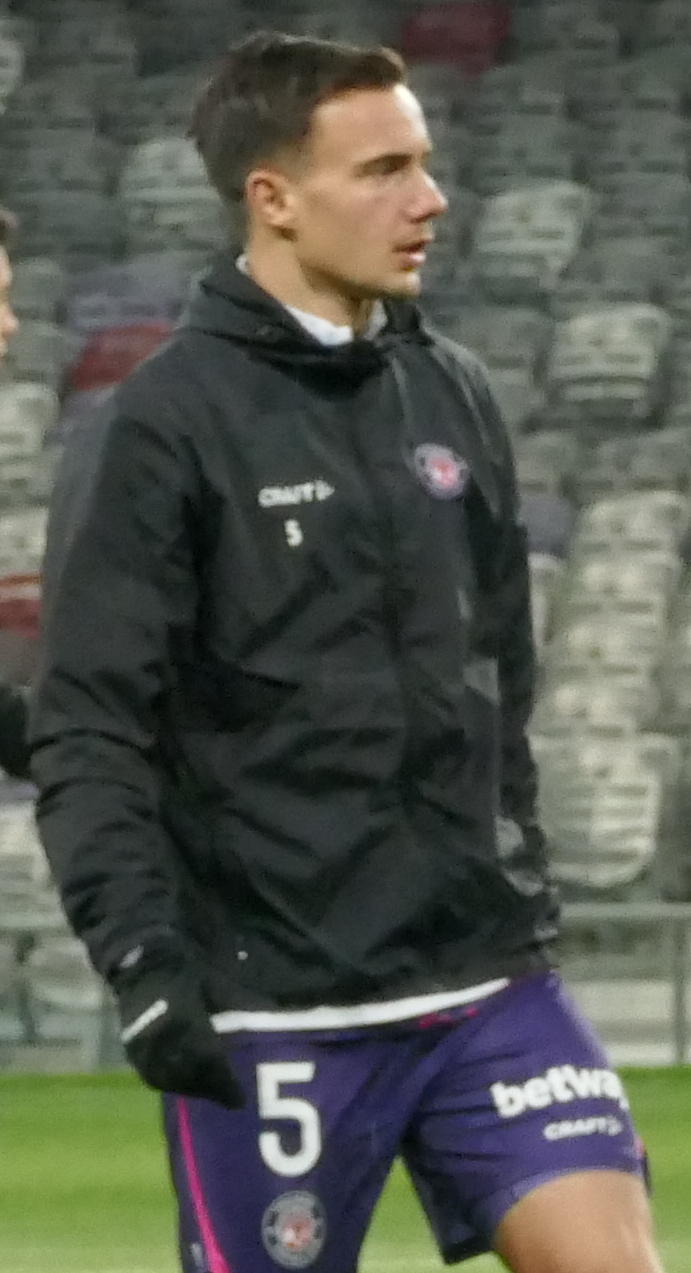
Denis Genreau was the first Macarthur FC player to receive an international cap.

This section refers only to caps won while a Macarthur FC player.

- First capped player: Denis Genreau, for Australia against Chinese Taipei on 7 June 2021.
- Most capped player: Charles M'Mombwa with 8 caps.

== Managerial records ==
- First full-time manager: Ante Milicic managed Macarthur FC 15 from May 2022 to 8 May 2022
- Longest-serving manager: Ante Milicic – 2 years, 358 days (15 May 2019 to 8 May 2022)
- Highest win percentage: Dwight Yorke, 52.63%
- Lowest win percentage: Ante Milicic, 39.29%

== Club records ==
=== Matches ===
==== Firsts ====
- First match: Macarthur South West United 0–4 Central Coast Mariners, friendly, 12 October 2018
- First A-League Men match: Western Sydney Wanderers 0–1 Macarthur FC, 30 December 2020
- First Australia Cup match: Newcastle Olympic 0–3 Macarthur FC, 13 November 2021
- First AFC Cup match: Shan United 0–3 Macarthur FC, 21 September 2023
- First competitive match at Campbelltown Stadium: Macarthur FC 0–2 Central Coast Mariners, A-League Men, 3 January 2021

==== Record wins ====
- Record A-League Men win: 6–1 against Perth Glory, 20 October 2024
- Record Australia Cup win: 6–0 against Magpies Crusaders United, 30 July 2022
- Record AFC Cup win: 8–2 against Cebu, 5 October 2023

==== Record defeats ====
- Record A-League Men defeat: 1–6 against Melbourne City, 4 February 2023
- Record Australia Cup defeat: 0–2 against Sydney FC, 8 December 2021
- Record AFC Cup defeat: 0–3 against Phnom Penh Crown, 26 October 2023

==== Record consecutive results ====
- Record consecutive wins: 5, from 30 July 2022 to 1 October 2022
- Record consecutive defeats: 3
  - from 19 April 2022 to 1 May 2022
  - from 14 April 2023 to 29 April 2023
  - from 18 December 2023 to 1 January 2024
- Record consecutive matches without a win: 7, from 11 March 2023 to 29 April 2023
- Record consecutive matches without a defeat: 9
  - from 8 May 2022 to 21 October 2022
  - from 29 October 2023 to 14 December 2023
- Record consecutive matches without conceding a goal: 3
  - from 30 July 2022 to 31 August 2022
  - from 1 October 2022 to 16 October 2022
- Record consecutive matches without scoring a goal: 2
  - from 8 March 2021 to 12 March 2021
  - from 18 February 2023 to 25 February 2023
  - from 1 March 2025 to 7 March 2023

=== Goals ===
- Most league goals scored in a season: 50 in 27 matches, 2024–25
- Fewest league goals scored in a season: 31 in 26 matches, 2022–23
- Most league goals conceded in a season: 48 in 26 matches, 2022–23, 48 in 27 matches, 2023–24
- Fewest league goals conceded in a season: 36 in 26 matches, 2020–21

=== Points ===
- Most points in a season: 39 in 26 matches, A-League, 2020–21
- Fewest points in a season: 26 in 26 matches, A-League Men, 2022–23

=== Attendances ===
- Highest attendance in Campbelltown: 8,002, against Sydney FC, A-League Men, March 1 2025
- Lowest attendance in Campbelltown: 1,521, against Wellington Phoenix, Australia Cup, 31 August 2022
