= 2020–21 Macarthur FC season =

Macarthur FC
2020–21 season
- Chairman: Rabieh Krayem
- Manager: Ante Milicic
- Stadium: Campbelltown Stadium
- A-League: 6th
- A-League Finals: Semi-finals
- FFA Cup: Cancelled
- Top goalscorer: Matt Derbyshire (14)
- Highest home attendance: 5,126 vs Wellington Phoenix (4 June 2021); A-League
- Lowest home attendance: 1,872 vs Western United (20 March 2021); A-League
- Average home league attendance: 3,352
Home colours	Away colours

The 2020–21 season was the first in the history of Macarthur Football Club. The club competed in the A-League for the first time.

== Players ==
Note: Flags indicate national team as defined under FIFA eligibility rules; some limited exceptions apply. Players may hold more than one non-FIFA nationality.

No.	Pos.	Nation	Player
1	GK	AUS	Adam Federici
2	DF	AUS	Jake McGing
3	DF	AUS	Antony Golec
4	MF	ESP	Beñat
5	MF	AUS	Mark Milligan (captain)
6	DF	AUS	Aleksandar Jovanovic
7	DF	AUS	Ivan Franjic
8	MF	AUS	Denis Genreau
9	FW	AUS	Milislav Popovic
10	MF	FRA	Loïc Puyo
11	MF	AUS	Tommy Oar
12	DF	AUS	James Meredith
13	DF	AUS	Yianni Nicolaou

No.	Pos.	Nation	Player
14	FW	AUS	Moudi Najjar (on loan from Melbourne City)
15	DF	AUS	Aleksandar Šušnjar
16	GK	AUS	Nicholas Suman
17	FW	AUS	Kyle Cimenti
19	MF	AUS	Michael Ruhs
21	MF	AUS	Jake Hollman
22	MF	AUS	Liam Rose
23	DF	AUS	Walter Scott
24	MF	AUS	Charles M'Mombwa
27	FW	ENG	Matt Derbyshire
29	MF	CYP	Antonis Martis (on loan from Midtjylland)
31	MF	AUS	Lachlan Rose
33	MF	ESP	Markel Susaeta

== Transfers ==
=== Transfers in ===
No.	Position	Player	Transferred from	Type/fee	Contract length	Date	Ref
11	FW	Tommy Oar	Central Coast Mariners	Free transfer	2 years	15 January 2020	
8	MF	Denis Genreau	Melbourne City	Free transfer	3 years	28 July 2020	
1	GK	Adam Federici	Unattached	Free transfer	2 years	30 July 2020	
5	MF	Mark Milligan	Unattached	Free transfer	2 years	30 July 2020	
27	FW	(England) Matt Derbyshire	Unattached	Free transfer	2 years	4 August 2020	
9	FW	Milislav Popovic	Unattached	Free transfer	1 year	28 August 2020	
7	DF	Ivan Franjic	Perth Glory	Free transfer	1 year	1 September 2020	
16	GK	Nicholas Suman	Western Sydney Wanderers	Free transfer		7 September 2020	
15	DF	Aleksandar Šušnjar	Unattached	Free transfer		7 October 2020	
14	FW	Moudi Najjar	Melbourne City	Loan	1 year	8 October 2020	
21	MF	Jake Hollman	Sydney FC Youth	Free transfer	1 year	9 October 2020	
6	DF	Aleksandar Jovanovic	Unattached	Free transfer	2 years	13 October 2020	
10	MF	(France) Loïc Puyo	Unattached	Free transfer	1 year	19 October 2020	
29	MF	(Cyprus) Antonis Martis	(Denmark) Midtjylland	Loan	1 year	21 October 2020	
22	MF	Liam Rose	(Australia) Sydney United	Free transfer	1 year	26 October 2020	
19	MF	Michael Ruhs	(Australia) Sydney United	Free transfer	1 year	26 October 2020	
2	DF	Jake McGing	Unattached	Free transfer		28 October 2020	
4	MF	(Spain) Beñat	Unattached	Free transfer	1 year	13 November 2020	
33	FW	(Spain) Markel Susaeta	Unattached	Free transfer	1 year	18 November 2020	
24	MF	Charles M'Mombwa	Unattached	Free transfer	1 year	20 November 2020	
13	DF	Yianni Nicolaou	Unattached	Free transfer	1 year	20 November 2020	
23	DF	Walter Scott	Unattached	Free transfer	1 year	20 November 2020	
3	DF	Antony Golec	Unattached	Free transfer		26 November 2020	
31	MF	Lachlan Rose	Unattached	Free transfer	1 year	26 November 2020	
12	DF	James Meredith	Perth Glory	Free transfer	1 year	9 December 2020	
17	FW	Kyle Cimenti	(Australia) Rockdale Ilinden	Free transfer	1 month	21 May 2021	

=== Contracts extensions ===
No.	Name	Position	Duration	Date	Notes
21	Jake Hollman	Midfielder	2 years	15 February 2021	
31	Lachlan Rose	Winger	2 years	4 March 2021	

== Pre-season and friendlies ==
Win Draw Loss Fixtures

25 October 2020	Camden Tigers (Australia)	0–6	Macarthur FC	Camden
		Report	Rose; Ruhs; Hollman; Triallist; Triallist; Triallist	Stadium: Ron Dine Memorial Reserve

31 October 2020	Sydney FC	2–1	Macarthur FC
		Report

17 November 2020	Macarthur FC	1–2	Australia U23	Sydney
15:00 AEDT	La. Rose 67'	Report	Metcalfe 78'; Najjarine 79'	Stadium: Netstrata Jubilee Stadium

26 November 2020	Newcastle Jets	3–3	Macarthur FC	Maitland
17:15 AEDT	Yuel 42'; Boogaard 63'; Mauragis 82'	Report	Derbyshire 45+3', 58'; Najjar 65'	Stadium: Maitland Sportsground

2 December 2020	Macarthur FC	1–0	Wellington Phoenix	Sydney
13:00 NZDT	Derbyshire 1'	Report		Attendance: 0 (behind closed doors)

10 December 2020	Macarthur FC	3–1	Adelaide United	Sydney
11:00 AEDT	Franjic 20'; Najjar 43'; Derbyshire 44'	Report	Mauk 47' (pen.)	Stadium: Valentine Sports Park; Attendance: 0 (behind closed doors); Referee: Kurt Ams

== Competitions ==
=== Overview ===
Competition	First match	Last match	Starting round	Final position	Record							
Competition	First match	Last match	Starting round	Final position	Pld	W	D	L	GF	GA	GD	Win %
A-League	30 December 2020	4 June 2021	Matchday 1	6th	26	11	6	9	33	36	−3	42.31
A-League Finals	12 June 2021	20 June 2021	Elimination-finals	Semi-finals	2	1	0	1	2	2	+0	50.00
Total					28	12	6	10	35	38	−3	42.86

Source: Soccerway

=== A-League ===
==== League table ====
Pos	Team	Pld	W	D	L	GF	GA	GD	Pts	Qualification
4	Brisbane Roar	26	11	7	8	36	28	+8	40	Qualification for finals series (Note: The top two teams entered the finals series at the semi-finals, while the teams ranked third to sixth entered the finals series at the elimination-finals.)
5	Adelaide United	26	11	6	9	39	41	−2	39	Qualification for finals series
6	Macarthur FC	26	11	6	9	33	36	−3	39	Qualification for finals series
7	Wellington Phoenix (Note: Wellington Phoenix cannot qualify for Asian Football Confederation competitions as they are based in New Zealand, which is under the Oceania Football Confederation.)	26	10	8	8	44	34	+10	38	
8	Western Sydney Wanderers	26	9	8	9	45	43	+2	35	

Source: A-Leagues
Rules for classification: 1) Points; 2) Goal difference; 3) Goals scored; 4) Least red cards; 5) Least yellow cards; 6) Toss of a coin in an event of a tie of two clubs.

==== Results summary ====
Overall								Home						Away					
Pld	W	D	L	GF	GA	GD	Pts	W	D	L	GF	GA	GD	W	D	L	GF	GA	GD
26	11	6	9	33	36	−3	39	4	4	5	19	20	−1	7	2	4	14	16	−2

Last updated: complete.
Source: Ultimate A-League

==== Results by round ====
Round	1	2	3	4	5	6	7	7	8	9	10	11	12	13	14	15	16	16	17	18	19	20	21	22	23	23	24
Ground	A	H	H	A	B	H	H	A	H	A	A	A	A	H	A	H	H	A	H	H	A	A	H	A	H	A	H
Result	W	L	D	W	B	L	D	W	W	L	W	L	L	W	W	W	L	L	D	D	D	W	W	D	L	W	L
Position	1	5	3	2	4	6	4	4	2	3	2	2	6	5	4	3	5	5	5	5	6	5	5	6	5	5	6
Points	3	3	4	7	7	7	8	11	14	14	17	17	17	20	23	26	26	26	27	28	29	32	35	36	36	39	39

Source: Ultimate A-League
A = Away; H = Home; B = Bye; W = Win; D = Draw; L = Loss

==== Matches ====
30 December 2020 1	Western Sydney Wanderers	0–1	Macarthur FC	Sydney
19:10 AEDT		Report	Milligan 72'	Stadium: Bankwest Stadium; Attendance: 10,128; Referee: Kurt Ams

3 January 2021 2	Macarthur FC	0–2	Central Coast Mariners	Campbelltown
16:05 AEDT		Report	De Silva 35'; Smylie 89'	Stadium: Campbelltown Stadium; Attendance: 4,538; Referee: Daniel Elder

9 January 2021 3	Macarthur FC	1–1	Wellington Phoenix	Campbelltown
17:05 AEDT	Susaeta 67'	Report	Ball 39'; Rufer (red card) 62'	Stadium: Campbelltown Stadium; Attendance: 2,609; Referee: Stephen Lucas

17 January 2021 4	Newcastle Jets	1–2	Macarthur FC	Newcastle
16:05 AEDT	Yuel 42'	Report	Puyo 8'; Derbyshire 23'	Stadium: McDonald Jones Stadium; Attendance: 4,455; Referee: Benjamin Abraham

30 January 2021 6	Macarthur FC	0–3	Sydney FC	Campbelltown
19:05 AEDT	Milligan (red card) 21'	Report	Patrick Wood 66', 86'; Ninković 76'	Stadium: Campbelltown Stadium; Attendance: TBA; Referee: Alex King

6 February 2021 7	Macarthur FC	2–2	Western Sydney Wanderers	Campbelltown
19:05 AEDT	Jovanovic 18'; Šušnjar 58'	Report	Dorrans 52'; Cox 71'	Stadium: Campbelltown Stadium; Attendance: 4,723; Referee: Shaun Evans

9 February 2021 7	Brisbane Roar	0–2	Macarthur FC	Brisbane
19:35 AEDT		Report	Genreau 76'; Derbyshire 90'	Stadium: Dolphin Stadium; Attendance: 4,693; Referee: Kurt Ams

12 February 2021 8	Macarthur FC	4–0	Adelaide United	Campbelltown
19:05 AEDT	Derbyshire 66', 73', 89'; Milligan 83'	Report		Stadium: Campbelltown Stadium; Attendance: TBA; Referee: Chris Beath

20 February 2021 9	Western United	4–1	Macarthur FC	Ballarat
17:05 AEDT	Guarrotxena 26'; Berisha 45', 66'; Pierias 54'	Report	Derbyshire 90+1'	Stadium: MARS Stadium; Attendance: 1,505; Referee: Jonathan Barreiro

28 February 2021 10	Sydney FC	0–1	Macarthur FC	Sydney
	Retre (red card) 38'	Report	Derbyshire 36'	Stadium: Jubilee Oval; Attendance: 10,158; Referee: Alex King

8 March 2021 11	Central Coast Mariners	2–0	Macarthur FC	Gosford
18:00 AEST	Simon 9'; Hatch 81'	Report		Stadium: Central Coast Stadium; Attendance: 5,003; Referee: Chris Beath

12 March 2021 12	Melbourne City	3–0	Macarthur FC	Melbourne
19:05 AEST	Maclaren 23', 25'; Noone 35'	Report		Stadium: AAMI Park; Attendance: 4,884; Referee: Alex King

20 March 2021 13	Macarthur FC	2–1	Western United	Campbelltown
17:05 AEDT	Derbyshire 35'; Susaeta 45+1'	Report	Pierias 8'	Stadium: Campbelltown Stadium; Attendance: 1,872; Referee: Adam Kersey

28 March 2021 14	Wellington Phoenix	0–1	Macarthur FC	Wollongong
16:00 AEST		Report	Genreau 65'	Stadium: WIN Stadium; Attendance: 2,516; Referee: Adam Fielding

2 April 2021 15	Macarthur FC	2–0	Perth Glory	Campbelltown
15:05 AEDT	Derbyshire 10', 45' (pen.)	Report		Stadium: Campbelltown Stadium; Attendance: 3,724; Referee: Kurt Ams

9 April 2021 16	Macarthur FC	1–2	Brisbane Roar	Campbelltown
19:05 AEST	Rose 90'	Report	Wenzel-Halls 12'; Danzaki 58'	Stadium: Campbelltown Stadium; Attendance: 2,786; Referee: Alireza Faghani

14 April 2021 16	Adelaide United	3–1	Macarthur FC	Adelaide
19:05 ACST	Juric 15'; Goodwin 72' (pen.); Halloran 84'	Report	Derbyshire 33'	Stadium: Coopers Stadium; Attendance: 7,184; Referee: Stephen Lucas

18 April 2021 17	Macarthur FC	2–2	Newcastle Jets	Campbelltown
18:10 AEST	M'Mombwa 36'; Puyo 45+2'	Report	O'Donovan 27' (pen.); Ugarkovic 57'	Stadium: Campbelltown Stadium; Attendance: 2,854; Referee: Lachlan Keevers

24 April 2021 18	Macarthur FC	1–1	Melbourne City	Macarthur
19:10 AEST	Ruhs 77'	Report	Metcalfe 59'	Stadium: Campbelltown Stadium; Attendance: 3,027; Referee: Shaun Evans

1 May 2021 19	Perth Glory	0–0	Macarthur FC	Perth
13:05 AWST		Report		Stadium: HBF Park; Attendance: 3,253; Referee: Ben Abraham

6 May 2021 20	Melbourne Victory	1–2	Macarthur FC	Melbourne
19:05 AEST	Kamsoba 23'	Report	Susaeta 31'; Meredith 69'	Stadium: AAMI Park; Attendance: 3,822; Referee: Chris Beath

14 May 2021 21	Macarthur FC	3–1	Melbourne Victory	Campbelltown
19:05 AEST	Derbyshire 4', 89'; Meredith 39'	Report	Kamsoba 78'	Stadium: Campbelltown Stadium; Attendance: 3,212; Referee: Adam Kersey

23 May 2021 22	Perth Glory	1–1	Macarthur FC	Perth
20:15 AWST	Castro 13' (pen.)	Report	Derbyshire 30'	Stadium: HBF Park; Attendance: 5,282; Referee: Ben Abraham

27 May 2021 23	Macarthur FC	1–2	Central Coast Mariners	Campbelltown
19:05 AEDT	Susaeta 17'	Report	Clisby 31'; De Silva 55'	Stadium: Campbelltown Stadium; Attendance: 4,379; Referee: Chris Beath

31 May 2021 23	Western United	1–2	Macarthur FC	Sydney
19:05 AEDT	Guarrotxena 63'	Report	Susaeta 27'; Milligan 31'	Stadium: Leichhardt Oval; Referee: Adam Kersey

4 June 2021 24	Macarthur FC	0–3	Wellington Phoenix	Campbelltown
19:05 AEST		Report	Ball 45+1'; Hemed 46'; Waine 90+2'	Stadium: Campbelltown Stadium; Attendance: 5,126; Referee: Daniel Elder

==== Finals series ====
12 June 2021 Elimination-finals	Central Coast Mariners	0–2 (a.e.t.)	Macarthur FC	Gosford
19:05 AEST		Report	M'Mombwa 93'; Ruhs 120+1'	Stadium: Central Coast Stadium; Attendance: 11,565; Referee: Shaun Evans

20 June 2021 Semi-finals	Melbourne City	2–0	Macarthur FC	Sydney
16:05 AEST	Colakovski 54'; Tilio 55'	Report		Stadium: Jubilee Stadium; Attendance: 2,283; Referee: Daniel Elder

== Statistics ==
=== Appearances and goals ===
Includes all competitions. Players with no appearances not included in the list.

No.	Pos	Nat	Player	Total		A-League		A-League Finals	
No.	Pos	Nat	Player	Apps	Goals	Apps	Goals	Apps	Goals
1	GK	(Australia) AUS	Adam Federici	28	0	26	0	2	0
2	DF	(Australia) AUS	Jake McGing	12	0	10	0	2	0
3	DF	(Australia) AUS	Antony Golec	18	0	5+11	0	0+2	0
4	MF	(Spain) ESP	Beñat	24	0	19+3	0	2	0
5	MF	(Australia) AUS	Mark Milligan	27	3	25	3	2	0
6	DF	(Australia) AUS	Aleksandar Jovanović	13	1	13	1	0	0
7	DF	(Australia) AUS	Ivan Franjic	19	0	14+3	0	1+1	0
8	MF	(Australia) AUS	Denis Genreau	23	2	22+1	2	0	0
9	FW	(Australia) AUS	Milislav Popovic	5	0	0+5	0	0	0
10	MF	(France) FRA	Loïc Puyo	21	2	15+5	2	1	0
11	MF	(Australia) AUS	Tommy Oar	21	0	13+6	0	2	0
12	DF	(Australia) AUS	James Meredith	19	2	16+2	2	1	0
14	FW	(Australia) AUS	Moudi Najjar	7	0	4+2	0	0+1	0
15	DF	(Australia) AUS	Aleksandar Šušnjar	26	1	22+2	1	2	0
19	FW	(Australia) AUS	Michael Ruhs	15	2	3+10	1	0+2	1
21	MF	(Australia) AUS	Jake Hollman	17	0	3+13	0	0+1	0
22	MF	(Australia) AUS	Liam Rose	15	0	6+8	0	0+1	0
24	MF	(Australia) AUS	Charles M'Mombwa	14	2	8+4	1	2	1
27	FW	(England) ENG	Matt Derbyshire	27	14	24+1	14	2	0
29	MF	(Cyprus) CYP	Antonis Martis	22	0	6+14	0	2	0
31	FW	(Australia) AUS	Lachlan Rose	25	1	10+14	1	0+1	0
33	FW	(Spain) ESP	Markel Susaeta	23	5	18+3	5	1+1	0

- Source: Soccerway

=== Disciplinary record ===
Includes all competitions. The list is sorted by squad number when total cards are equal. Players with no cards not included in the list.

No.	Pos	Nat	Player	Total			A-League			A-League Finals		
No.	Pos	Nat	Player	Yellow card	Second yellow card	Red card	Yellow card	Second yellow card	Red card	Yellow card	Second yellow card	Red card
5	MF	(Australia) AUS	Mark Milligan	5	0	1	4	0	1	1	0	0
10	MF	(France) FRA	Loïc Puyo	1	0	1	1	0	1	0	0	0
12	DF	(Australia) AUS	James Meredith	0	0	1	0	0	0	0	0	1
15	DF	(Australia) AUS	Aleksandar Šušnjar	8	0	0	8	0	0	0	0	0
27	FW	(England) ENG	Matt Derbyshire	7	0	0	7	0	0	0	0	0
8	MF	(Australia) AUS	Denis Genreau	6	0	0	6	0	0	0	0	0
29	MF	(Cyprus) CYP	Antonis Martis	5	0	0	4	0	0	1	0	0
3	DF	(Australia) AUS	Antony Golec	4	0	0	3	0	0	1	0	0
19	FW	(Australia) AUS	Michael Ruhs	4	0	0	3	0	0	1	0	0
24	MF	(Australia) AUS	Charles M'Mombwa	4	0	0	3	0	0	1	0	0
7	DF	(Australia) AUS	Ivan Franjic	3	0	0	3	0	0	0	0	0
21	MF	(Australia) AUS	Jake Hollman	3	0	0	3	0	0	0	0	0
4	MF	(Spain) ESP	Beñat	2	0	0	2	0	0	0	0	0
6	DF	(Australia) AUS	Aleksandar Jovanović	2	0	0	2	0	0	0	0	0
22	MF	(Australia) AUS	Liam Rose	2	0	0	2	0	0	0	0	0
33	FW	(Spain) ESP	Markel Susaeta	2	0	0	1	0	0	1	0	0
1	GK	(Australia) AUS	Adam Federici	1	0	0	1	0	0	0	0	0
9	FW	(Australia) AUS	Milislav Popovic	1	0	0	1	0	0	0	0	0
31	FW	(Australia) AUS	Lachlan Rose	1	0	0	1	0	0	0	0	0

- Source: Soccerway
- (yellow card) = Number of bookings; (second yellow card) = Number of sending offs after a second yellow card; (red card) = Number of sending offs by a direct red card.
