= Loïc Puyo =

French footballer (born 1988)

Personal information
- Date of birth: 19 December 1988 (age 37)
- Place of birth: Orléans, France
- Height: 1.82 m (6 ft 0 in)
- Position: Midfielder

Team information
- Current team: Rockdale Ilinden
- Number: 19

Youth career
- 1999–2005: Orléans
- 2005–2006: Auxerre

Senior career*
Years	Team	Apps	(Gls)
2006–2011	Auxerre	0	(0)
2006–2011	Auxerre B	68	(11)
2011–2013	Amiens	55	(5)
2013–2015	Orléans	50	(10)
2015–2016	Nancy B	4	(1)
2015–2017	Nancy	50	(3)
2017–2019	Angers B	13	(1)
2017–2019	Angers	8	(0)
2019–2020	Red Star	17	(0)
2020–2021	Macarthur FC	21	(2)
2022	Chambly	13	(0)
2023–	Rockdale Ilinden	15	(3)
- * Club domestic league appearances and goals as of 28 May 2023

Loïc Puyo (born 19 December 1988) is a French retired professionalfootballer who last played for Red star.

== Club career ==
=== Youth career ===
Born in Orléans, in 1999, at the age of 10, he became a player of Orléans, where he stood out as a talented player among his peers with his left foot being one of his key attributes. Impressing during his time at the club, unlike many of his teammates who went to Châteauroux for further development, he decided to remain in Loiret. In 2004, SC Bastia offered him a one-year contract, but he declined it, believing that it was too early for him in his career and remained with the club for a further year.

He joined Auxerre at the age of 15, where he was the only U-17 player to be included in the CFA squad with the potential to earn a five-year contract with the club. However, injuries prevented him from playing regularly and breaking into the professional team. Despite this setback, he was a finalist for the Gambardella Cup and U18 National Champions with Auxerre.

=== Amiens ===
Puyo departed to Amiens in Ligue 2, where he signed a two-year deal and earned his first taste of professional football. He made his professional first team debut on 30 July 2011 in a 1-1 Ligue 2 home draw against Troyes coming off the bench in the 83rd minute for Yoann Touzghar who scored earlier in the match.

After making his league debut two months and sixteen days, Loïc Puyo scored his first goal on 15 October 2011, in a 1-1 league draw against Arles-Avignon (now known as AC Arlésien) in the 35th minute after his team had been trailing by one goal for fourteen minutes before he managed to equalize the score. At the end of the season, Amiens found themselves in last place and relegated towards the Championnat National where he spent another season before leaving after his contract expired.

=== Orléans ===
Puyo reunited with US Orléans in 2013, who were playing in the Championnat National, after leaving the club in 2005. On 6 April 2014, Puyo was key in a crucial league game against last place Uzès, converting a penalty to make the score 2-1, with the final score ending 3-2 for Puyo's side. The result led Orléans to second place on the ladder. Orléans was promoted to Ligue 2 by the end of the season, where Puyo was continued playing for another season. Unfortunately, Puyo suffered a knee injury mid-season which forced him to sit out the remainder of the season.

=== Nancy Lorraine ===
On 6 July 2015 Puyo joined Nancy Lorraine on a free transfer until 2016. At the time, he was still recovering from both a knee injury and a thigh injury that had caused him to miss most of the beginning of the season. He joined the club with the likes of Clément Lenglet and Youssef Ait Bennasser who stood out to him the most.

=== Angers ===
On 12 July 2017, following Nancy's relegation back down to Ligue 2, Puyo signed a two-year deal with Angers on a free transfer, becoming the sixth recruit under the management of Stéphane Moulin. During his time at the club, Puyo struggled for first-team opportunities even in the reserve side, where he only made 1 appearance in Championnat National 3 by October. However, he was given a chance to start for the first team in a cup match against Lorient. Due to several injuries and his inability to secure a place in the squad, Puyo was demoted to the reserves at Angers. He was subsequently asked to leave the club and explore other offers. Although it was reported that Apollon Smyrnis and Brisbane Roar made offers, they were both declined.

=== Red Star ===
After struggling to regain a place in first team football, Puyo joined Red Star who were recently relegated from Ligue 2. He was given the number 14.

=== Macarthur FC ===
Since 2018, Puyo began considering a move to Australia after hearing about a new club being formed in the A-League through his agent. He felt mentally frustrated during the last three seasons and was convinced that joining the A-League would be a positive change after being in contact with Florin Berenguer, who played with Melbourne City. In February 2020, Puyo first contacted Macarthur FC, and the club offered him a fair salary. However, due to the Covid-19 pandemic and the A-League broadcaster deal falling through, Macarthur had difficulty finalizing Puyo's contract due to financial struggles. It was only after a new broadcast deal was signed and planned that Macarthur completed the contract offer, and Puyo became a new confirmed signing. After completing his visa and finally securing a plane ticket after several attempts, he was set to join Macarthur and was announced on 19 October 2020.

Upon arriving in Australia, Puyo found it challenging to adjust to the hot weather, with temperatures reaching 40 degrees. He experienced difficulties in performing well during training and arrived late to a friendly match, which resulted in him missing out on a starting position and receiving a fine of €90.

On 30 December 2020 Puyo played in his first league game for Macarthur which was the club first ever league game in its history, which resulted in a 1-0 win over their western rivals, Western Sydney Wanderers. However, his debut was cut short in the 58th minute after he received a blow to the head during the game. Puyo had to receive three stitches to treat a bleeding skull injury. On 17 January 2021, Puyo scored his first goal for the club in a 2-1 league win against Newcastle Jets scoring with his trademark left foot and helped the club top the table at the beginning of the season. He was released at the end of the season alongside Ivan Franjic, Walter Scott, Milislav Popovic and Kyle Cimenti.

=== Chambly and Rockdale Ilinden ===
After six months without a club, Puyo signed with Chambly on 1 February 2022. He moved back to Australia, joining Rockdale Ilinden on 2 February 2023 in the National Premier Leagues, the second tier of Australian football.

== Personal life ==
Puyo has a cousin, Titouan, who was born in Polynesia and is a surfer and stand-up paddle world champion. Puyo also writes articles for SoFoot talking about his experiences as a footballer since joining Macarthur.
