= Jack Mcloughlin =

Australian soccer player (born 2001)

Personal information
- Date of birth: 1 August 2001 (age 25)
- Place of birth: Australia
- Position: Midfielder

Youth career
- Fraser Park
- APIA Leichhardt
- Sydney Olympic
- 2019: North Shore Mariners

Senior career*
Years	Team	Apps	(Gls)
2019	North Shore Mariners	1	(0)
2020	CCM Academy	1	(0)
2020–2022	Northbridge Bulls	36	(0)
2021–2022	Macarthur FC	0	(0)
2022–2023	Hampton & Richmond Borough	1	(0)
- * Club domestic league appearances and goals as of 23:41, 17 October 2023 (UTC)

Jack Mcloughlin (born 1 August 2001) is an Australian professional soccer player who most recently played as a midfielder for Hampton & Richmond Borough. He made his professional debut with Macarthur FC on 8 December 2021 in a FFA Cup match against A-League Men side Sydney FC.
