= Michael Ruhs =

Australian soccer player

Personal information
- Full name: Michael Klaude Ruhs
- Date of birth: 27 August 2002 (age 24)
- Place of birth: Cecil Park, Australia
- Height: 1.83 m (6 ft 0 in)
- Positions: Forward; winger

Team information
- Current team: Sydney Olympic

Youth career
- 2007–2013: Liverpool Olympic FC
- 2014–2015: Mounties Wanderers
- 2016–2019: Sydney United 58

Senior career*
Years	Team	Apps	(Gls)
2019–2020	Sydney United 58	8	(1)
2020–2022	Macarthur FC	28	(3)
2021–2022	→ Northbridge Bulls	13	(4)
2022–2023	Central Coast Mariners	15	(2)
2023–2025	Western United	51	(8)
2023	Western United NPL	2	(2)
2025–2026	Brisbane Roar	25	(1)
2026–	Sydney Olympic	6	(6)

International career^{‡}
2018–2019	Australia U17	2	(1)
- * Club domestic league appearances and goals as of 22 November 2026 ‡ National team caps and goals as of 25 April 2021

Michael Klaude Ruhs (Polish: [klaudiusz Ruhs]; born 27 August 2002) is an Australian professional soccer player who plays for Sydney Olympic in the Australian Championship.

== Early life ==
Ruhs was born in Cecil Park but raised in Horsley Park. He played football since the age of five playing for Liverpool Olympic, until joining Mounties Wanderers in 2014 to start his journey through the NPL pyramid. Throughout his high school years, Ruhs attended Thomas Hassall Anglican College, playing for the state team in Melbourne and gaining acknowledgment from the school principal for his success. He won the CIS Sports Awards recognising his performance at the NSW All Schools Championships and in October 2020, he successfully completed his HSC exam.

== Club career ==
=== Sydney United ===
Ruhs joined Fairfield club Sydney United in 2016, playing through the youth levels until breaking into the first team in 2019. On 21 July 2019, at the age of 16 years old, Ruhs made his senior debut in a 2–0 loss against Sydney FC Youth. His first involvement was in a Round of 32 tie against St George FC, being brought on as a stoppage-time substitute, leading into extra time with the scored tied at 3–3. Ruhs provided an assist and scored his first career goal in the 112th minute to win the match 5–3 to progress into the next round. However, his side would soon be knocked out by Western Sydney Wanderers. In total, Ruhs would make eight league appearances and one goal before departing the club in 2020.

=== Macarthur FC ===
On 26 October 2020, Ruhs signed with Macarthur FC, along with United teammate Liam Rose, being part of the club's inaugural season in the A-League. Ruhs made his unofficial debut, scoring two goals, in a friendly against Camden Tigers for the club's first match in its history. His official debut would come 2 months later on 3 January 2021, being brought on in the 76th minute for Macarthur's first league home game losing 2–0 against Central Coast Mariners. During a match with Northbridge Bulls, he scored two goals against his former club Sydney United on 5 April, helping his side secure a 5–0 lead before half-time. He scored his first professional goal against Melbourne City on 24 April, taking advantage of a loose ball by Kerrin Stokes to level the score 1–1 in the 76th minute. On 12 June, Ruhs scored the winning goal in a 2–0 elimination-final win against Central Coast Mariners, running from one end of the pitch to the other to score past Mark Birighitti.

On 13 July, Ruhs extended his contract for one year with the Bulls, having been named a 'fan favourite' by South West Voice. On 19 February 2022, Ruhs scored in a 4–1 win against Adelaide United, making it his first and only goal for the 2021–22 A-League campaign. He finished with 13 league appearances, starting in only one match.

=== Central Coast Mariners ===
On 9 June 2022, Central Coast Mariners announced the signing of Ruhs ahead of the 2022–23 A-League season. Ruhs quickly adjusted with his new club, scoring in all four games he played in during preseason reportedly, against his former club Macarthur, and Western Sydney Wanderers (including matches against Melbourne City and Melbourne Victory).

On 31 July, Ruhs scored his first goal for the club against Sydney FC, in the Australia Cup, helping his side draw 3–3 to the end of extra time before eventually losing on penalties. On 5 November, he scored his first two league goals for the club, both assisted from Garang Kuol, against Western Sydney Wanderers, winning 3–0 comfortably at Western Sydney Stadium. On 6 February 2023, Mariners terminated Ruhs' contract by mutual agreement.

=== Western United ===
On 7 February, a day after departing from the Mariners, Ruhs signed a multi-deal contract with Western United that was set to expire in 2025.

On 6 April 2024, Ruhs became the first player to score multiple goals in the same match at Ironbark Fields, scoring a brace with goals in the 56th and 66th minutes in an eventual 4-2 win over Macarthur FC.

Ruhs spent two and a half seasons at Western United, making 54 appearances in all competitions, and scoring 9 goals. Ruhs left Western United at the end of the 2024-25 season.

=== Brisbane Roar ===
Ruhs joined Brisbane Roar ahead of the 2025-26 season. After one season, Ruhs left Brisbane Roar at the conclusion of his contract.

=== Sydney Olympic ===
On September 13 2026, Ruhs joined Sydney Olympic for their Australian Championship campaign.
