= Antonis Martis =

Cypriot footballer (born 2000)

Personal information
- Date of birth: 8 September 2000 (age 26)
- Place of birth: Athienou, Cyprus
- Height: 1.55 m (5 ft 1 in)
- Position: Midfielder

Youth career
- 2011–2012: Sydney Olympic
- 2012–2013: Canterbury Bankstown
- 2013–2015: FNSW NTC
- 2016–2020: Midtjylland

Senior career*
Years	Team	Apps	(Gls)
2020–2022	Midtjylland	0	(0)
2020–2022	→ Macarthur FC (loan)	23	(0)
2022	AEK Larnaca	0	(0)
2022	→ Doxa Katokopias (loan)	0	(0)
2023	Sutherland Sharks	9	(0)
2023–2024	Perth Glory	0	(0)

International career
2015	Australia U16	3	(1)
2018	Cyprus U19	7	(1)
Medal record
Men's football
Representing Australia
AFF U-16 Youth Championship
Third place	2015 Cambodia
- * Club domestic league appearances and goals as of 1 July 2024

Antonis Martis (Greek: Αντώνης Μάρτης; born 8 September 2000) is a former Cypriot professional footballer who played as a midfielder.

== Club career ==
Martis is a youth academy graduate of Danish club Midtjylland. On 21 October 2020, he joined A-League club Macarthur FC on a season long loan deal. He made his professional debut on 9 January 2021 in a 1–1 draw against Wellington Phoenix. In August 2021, it was announced that Midtjylland and Macarthur extended Martis's loan deal by another season. On 9 January 2022, his loan spell ended early as he was recalled by Midtjylland.

== International career ==
Born in Cyprus, Martis moved to Australia when he was three and is eligible to play for both nations. Martis has captained the Australia national under-17 soccer team at the 2016 AFC U-16 Championship qualifiers and has played for the Cyprus national under-19 football team at 2019 UEFA European Under-19 Championship qualifiers.
