= Mark Milligan =

Australian soccer player (born 1985)

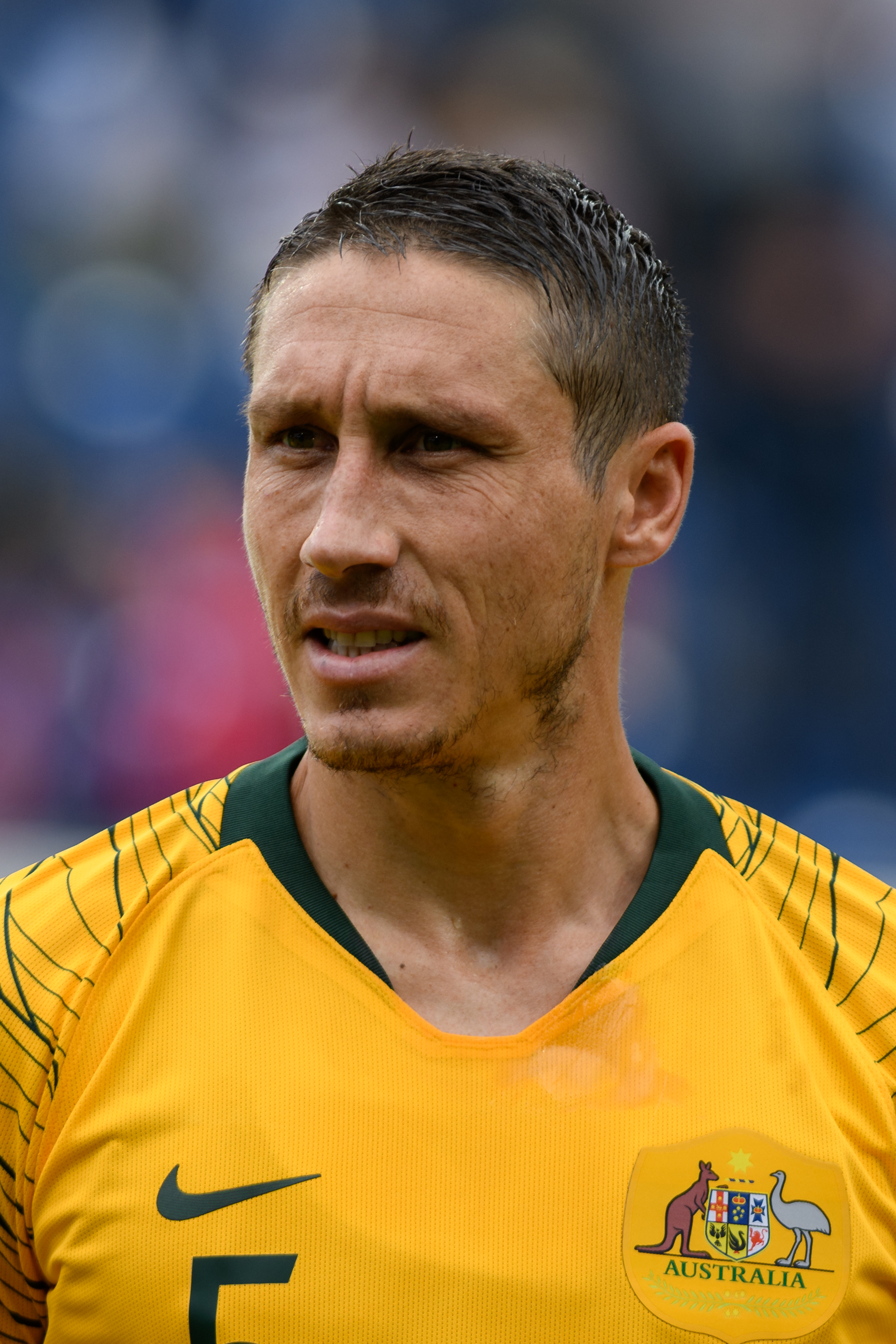
- Milligan with Australia in 2018

Personal information
- Full name: Mark Daniel Milligan
- Date of birth: 4 August 1985 (age 41)
- Place of birth: Sydney, New South Wales, Australia
- Height: 1.78 m (5 ft 10 in)
- Positions: Defensive midfielder; defender

Team information
- Current team: Newcastle Jets (head coach)

Youth career
- Parramatta Melita Eagles
- 2002: AIS

Senior career*
Years	Team	Apps	(Gls)
2002–2003	Northern Spirit	16	(1)
2004	Blacktown City	9	(5)
2005–2008	Sydney FC	42	(1)
2008–2009	Newcastle Jets	11	(1)
2009	Shanghai Shenhua	25	(1)
2010–2012	JEF United Chiba	53	(3)
2012	→ Melbourne Victory (loan)	10	(1)
2012–2015	Melbourne Victory	63	(13)
2015–2017	Baniyas	43	(5)
2017–2018	Melbourne Victory	14	(3)
2018	Al Ahli	8	(0)
2018–2019	Hibernian	28	(0)
2019–2020	Southend United	30	(0)
2020–2021	Macarthur FC	27	(3)
Total		379	(37)

International career
2003–2005	Australia U-20	11	(0)
2006–2008	Australia U-23	25	(7)
2006–2019	Australia	80	(6)

Managerial career
- 2022–2025: Adelaide United (assistant)
- 2025: Malaysia (assistant)
- 2025–: Newcastle Jets
Medal record
Representing Australia
Men's Association football
AFC Asian Cup
Winner	2015 Australia
OFC U-20 Championship
Winner	2005 Solomon Islands
- * Club domestic league appearances and goals

Mark Daniel Milligan (born 4 August 1985) is an Australian former professional soccer player. He is currently the head coach of A-League Men club Newcastle Jets.

Having started his career as a defender, he spent much of his later career playing as a midfielder. Milligan represented the Australia men's national soccer team eighty times, including at four FIFA World Cup tournaments. During a 19-year professional career, he also played abroad for clubs in China, Japan, the United Arab Emirates, Saudi Arabia, Scotland and England.

== Club career ==
Milligan started his grassroots football career at his local club, Birrong Sports Football club in the Bankstown District in 1991 and 1992, and he quickly moved onto representative football as a junior footballer.

=== Early career ===
FourFourTwo magazine revealed on 28 July 2007 that after the Asian Cup Milligan had gone without Sydney FC's permission to trial for teams in Europe. Milligan was linked with French sides Metz and Lens. The following day Milligan reportedly walked out on Metz just before a scheduled trial game appearance against Standard Liège, allegedly out of frustration at the right-back position he would be trialled in. The following day it was reported that Milligan would return home to play for Sydney FC after all.

During the summer of 2008, he was linked with a move to English Premier League clubs Blackburn Rovers, Manchester City and Arsenal, Lens of Ligue 1, as well as with Porto in the Primeira Liga and Bundesliga side Werder Bremen.

On 21 October 2008, The Sydney Morning Herald reported that Milligan had signed a guest contract with Newcastle United Jets for seven weeks. He made his debut on 24 October 2008, against Central Coast Mariners at Bluetongue Stadium, Gosford, where his team lost 1–0. During this time he was also sent off in a match against the Wellington Phoenix.

=== Asia ===
Milligan joined Chinese Super League outfit Shanghai Shenhua in January 2009, signing a three-year contract.

On 19 May, Milligan scored his first goal for Shanghai Shenhua in their 1–1 draw in the AFC Champions League group stage match against Kashima Antlers.

Milligan finalised his switch from Chinese side Shanghai Shenhua to Japanese side JEF United Chiba, who were relegated to the second division.

When the 2011 Tōhoku earthquake and tsunami struck Japan, Milligan decided to flee the country, fearing for the safety of not only himself, but his wife and child. With the J2 League suspended until further notice, JEF United Chiba gave permission for Milligan to train in a bid to keep his fitness up with his former A-League club Sydney FC.

=== Melbourne Victory ===
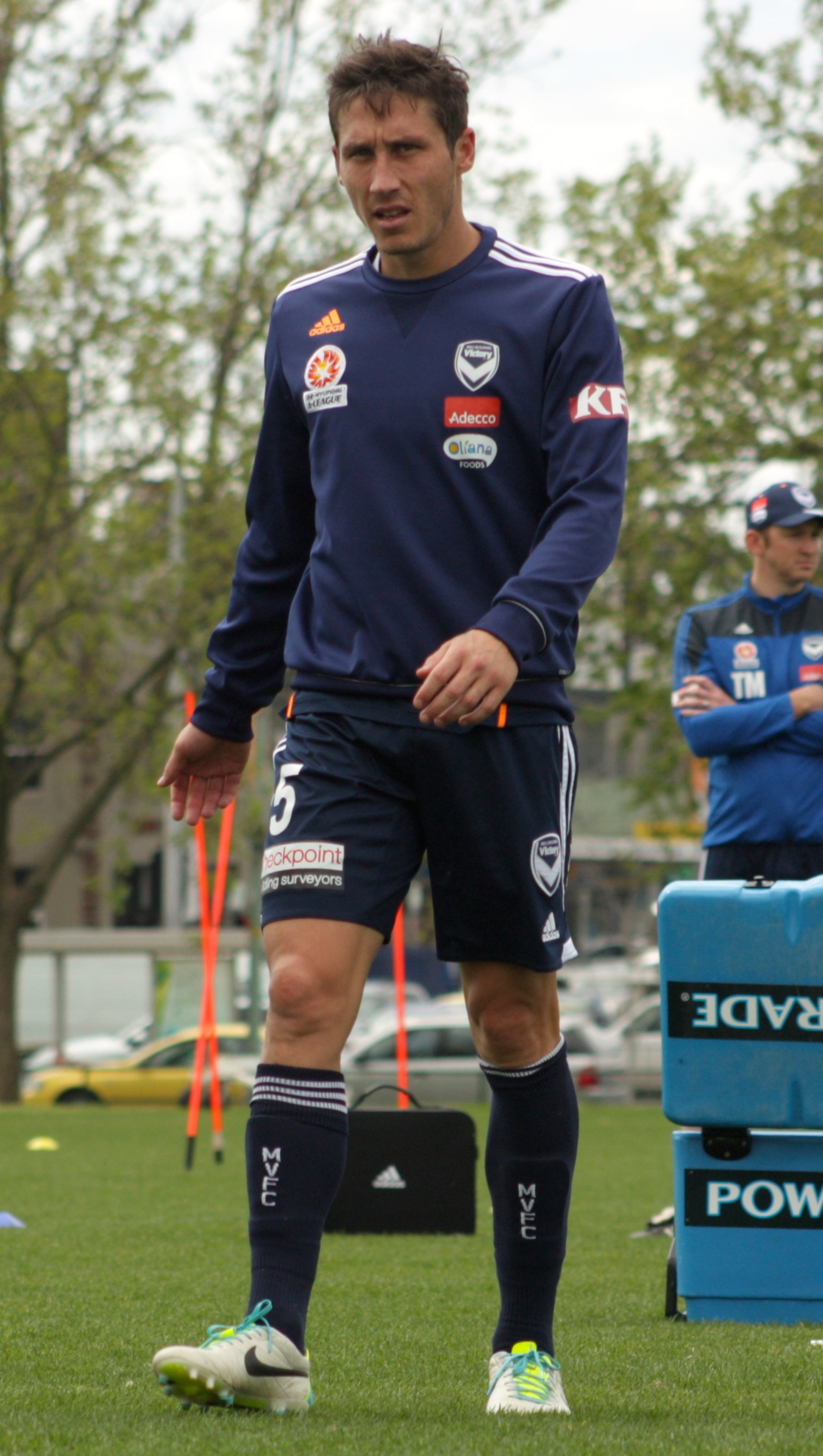
Milligan training with Melbourne Victory in 2013

On 23 January 2012 it was reported that Melbourne Victory was to secure Milligan on loan until the end of the regular season. It was confirmed on 24 January that Milligan signed for a loan deal to Melbourne Victory until the end of the 2011–12 A-League season, becoming the first Sydney FC player to switch to Melbourne Victory. He returned to Japan in March. In July 2012, Milligan was released from JEF United Chiba and returned to Melbourne Victory by signing a three-year contract.

Milligan starred for Melbourne Victory during their 2012–13 season, moving from centre-back to play as a defensive midfielder, and quickly established himself as one of the best players in the league. Although he has never been a prolific goal scorer, Milligan scored 8 goals in this season, a number of them being clutch goals in important games, including a penalty equaliser in an elimination final against Perth Glory that Melbourne Victory went on to win in extra time. To cap off his season, Milligan won the Victory Medal, awarded to the club's player of the season.

On 17 September 2013, Milligan was rewarded for his performances by being appointed the captain of Melbourne Victory, replacing Adrian Leijer. He was also rumoured to be leaving Melbourne Victory to join fellow national team midfielder Mile Jedinak at newly promoted Premier League club Crystal Palace, however Melbourne Victory rejected a rumoured £2 million offer for the defensive midfielder.

Milligan, after a trial at Crystal Palace, stayed on at Melbourne Victory as captain in the 2013–14 season. He sustained an injury halfway through the season, and the team suffered for this and other reasons such as losing their coach, an injury to Adrian Leijer (ex-captain and central defender) and four players (including three defenders) going to the Under 21 World championships (Jason Geria, Connor Pain, Scott Galloway and Nick Ansell). However, Victory improved after this period to finish fourth in the A-League. Milligan played every minute of all but one ACL match, only missing the final away match of the ACL Asian Champions League match through suspension.

On 17 May 2015, Milligan captained his side during their 3–0 defeat of Sydney FC in the 2014–15 A-League Grand Final, held at AAMI Park, Melbourne, and was awarded the Joe Marston Medal as the best player in the match.

=== Baniyas SC ===
At the end of the 2014–15 season it was announced that UAE Pro-League side Baniyas SC had triggered the release clause of Milligan's contract with a $1 million transfer fee, and he signed with them on a two-year contract.

=== Return to the Victory ===
On 31 July 2017, it was announced Milligan would return to the Victory on a one-year deal as a marquee player.

=== Al Ahli ===
On 28 January 2018, Melbourne Victory sold Mark Milligan to Al-Ahli for $1 million. He was assigned the number 5 shirt. On 4 February, he made his debut for Al-Ahli in a league game against Al Ittihad FC. He played at centre-half, with the game finishing 0-0. He got good response from the fans, playing the full 90 minutes in the Jeddah derby.

=== Hibernian ===
On 18 August 2018, Milligan signed a two-year contract with Scottish Premiership club Hibernian. Milligan played regularly for Hibernian during the 2018–19 season, after which he left the club. Hibernian head coach Paul Heckingbottom said that he had opted to exercise a break clause in Milligan's contract as he wanted to "recruit something different to play in that position".

=== Southend United ===
On 1 July 2019, Milligan signed for Southend United. Milligan was released by Southend United on 19 June 2020, after the team's relegation from League One.

=== Macarthur FC ===
On 30 July 2020, following his release from Southend, Milligan returned home to Australia to join newly formed A-League club Macarthur FC, signing a two-year deal. On 22 October, he was named the club's captain for their inaugural campaign in the A-League. In the club's first match, a local derby against Western Sydney Wanderers on 30 December, Milligan scored the club's first goal which secured a first-ever win.

On 2 June 2021, Milligan announced that he would be retiring from football at the end of the 2020–21 season and would join the coaching staff at Macarthur.

== International career ==
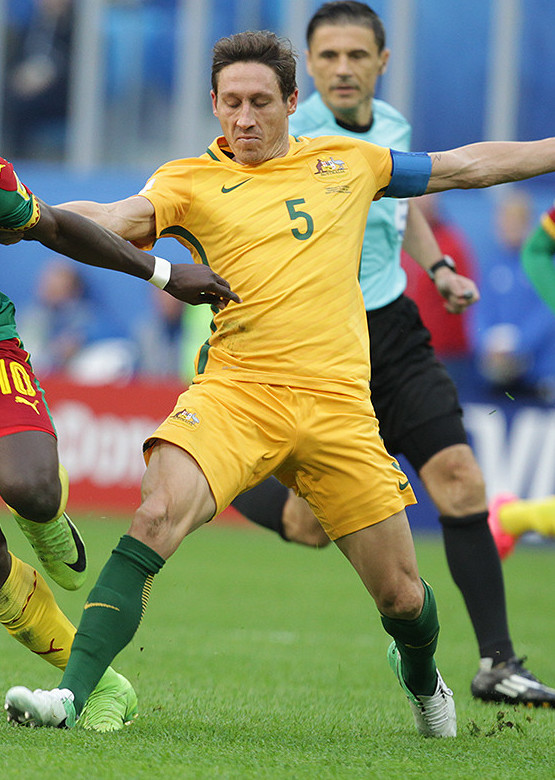
Milligan playing for Australia at the 2017 FIFA Confederations Cup

Milligan represented Australia at the 2005 FIFA World Youth Championship in the Netherlands. In May 2006, he was the youngest player selected in the Australian 2006 FIFA World Cup squad, being one of only two players chosen from the A-League – the other being Michael Beauchamp. Milligan had impressed coaches Graham Arnold and Johan Neeskens at a recent camp in Vietnam, while Guus Hiddink also recalled watching Milligan at the World Youth Championship.

He made his senior international debut against Liechtenstein on 7 June 2006, coming off the bench in the 85th minute of Australia's last warm-up game before the World Cup. He did not play in any of Australia's four World Cup games in Germany. His first start came against Kuwait in an Asian Cup qualifier on 16 August 2006. His next appearance was on 7 October 2006 in a friendly against Paraguay as a late substitute.

In February 2007, Milligan was named as captain of the Australian U-23 side, the 'Olyroos', for two Olympic qualifying games against Chinese Taipei. He sustained a broken nose in an 'off-the-ball' incident during the second qualifier. He led the Olyroos to Olympic qualification and was the key influential figure in their final games against Iraq and North Korea, scoring in each game and taking the man of the match award in both.

Milligan was selected in the Australian squad for the 2007 Asian Cup. During the tournament, Milligan was selected to play in the starting line-up for Australia against co-host nation Thailand in the final game of the group matches. Australia won 4–0 and advanced to the quarter finals of the competition with Milligan putting in what was widely regarded as a Man of the Match performance in the centre of a three-man defence. On 21 July 2007, in the quarter-final against Japan, Milligan was unfortunate in failing to clear a ball from the penalty area that saw striker Naohiro Takahara pounce and score an equaliser. The game ended 1–1 and Australia was eliminated from the Cup on penalties.

Milligan scored his first international goal for the Socceroos against Indonesia in a 2011 Asian Cup Qualifiers played at Suncorp Stadium in Brisbane. This being the only goal in the match with Australia winning 1–0 and then qualifying for the 2011 competition.

He was named in the 31 man squad named by Pim Verbeek for the 2010 FIFA World Cup in South Africa. His 2010 FIFA World Cup profile described him as "[a] mobile defender with good ball skills and an ability to play a raking pass."

Milligan was selected for the 30-man preliminary 2014 FIFA World Cup squad, alongside seven other A-League players. Three from Melbourne Victory (Milligan, James Troisi & Tom Rogic) were among the final selection. He played alongside James Troisi and captain Mile Jedinak in a three-man midfield in the Socceroos warm-up match vs Croatia. He played only one game in the 2014 World Cup, a 3–1 defeat against Chile in their opening match.

In 2015, he was a key member of Australia who won the 2015 AFC Asian Cup. He did not play in the opening game. After this game, he played in all the next five matches, including the final against South Korea. In the second game, he scored the goal against Oman national football team. Australia won the match by 4-0. After the Asian Cup success, he played seven games out of eight in second round of 2018 FIFA World Cup Qualification. He scored his fourth and fifth international goals against Tajikistan.

Milligan captained Australia at the 2017 FIFA Confederations Cup, and scored from the penalty spot in the 60th minute in a 1–1 draw against Cameroon.

In the third round of qualification, he played 8 games out of 10. Australia finished third in the table and failed to qualify directly to the World Cup. He played on the winning side in the two-leg tie Asian play-off against Syria. The match ended 3–2 on aggregate after extra time. He also played in the second leg game of 2018 FIFA World Cup qualification (CONCACAF–AFC play-off) against Honduras. This was the match which decided the last spot of 2018 FIFA World Cup. The match ended in favour of Australia by 3–1. With that, Australia qualified in the World Cup finals for the fourth time in a row. In May 2018 he was named in Australia's 23-man squad for the 2018 FIFA World Cup in Russia. Milligan played in central defence during the tournament, alongside Trent Sainsbury.

Milligan captained Australia at the 2019 AFC Asian Cup, in which they were knocked out at the quarter-final stage.

He retired from international football in December 2019.

== Coaching career ==
Milligan began his coaching journey by working as an assistant at Macarthur FC, Adelaide United and the Malaysian national team. Milligan also served as the head coach of St George FC for the 2022 NSW League One season, the third tier of Australian football.

=== Newcastle Jets ===
Ahead of the 2025–26 A-League season, Milligan took on his first professional senior coaching role, at one his former clubs from his playing days, Newcastle Jets. Milligan found success early, winning his first five games in charge enroute to winning the 2025 Australia Cup.

== Career statistics ==
=== Club ===
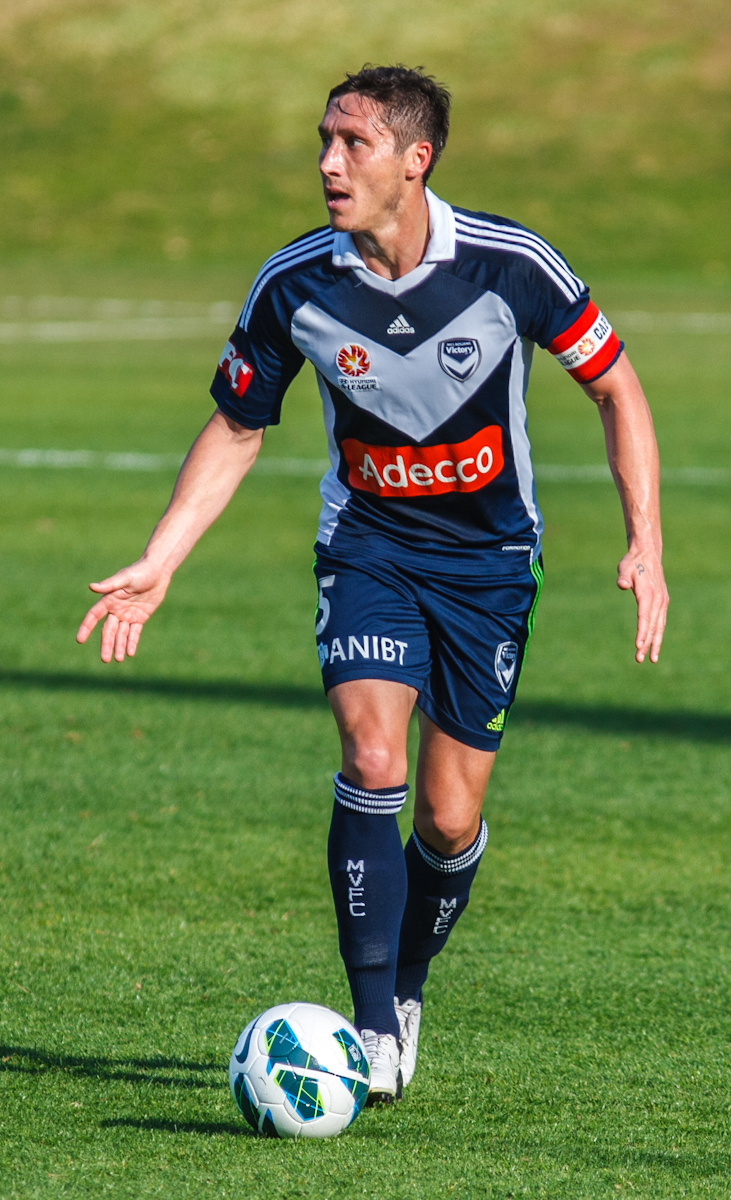
Milligan playing for Melbourne Victory in 2012

Appearances and goals by club, season and competition
Club	Season	League		National cup		Continental		Total	
Club	Season	Apps	Goals	Apps	Goals	Apps	Goals	Apps	Goals
Northern Spirit	2002–03	3	0	–		–		3	0
Northern Spirit	2003–04	13	1	–		–		13	1
Northern Spirit	Total	16	1	0	0	–		16	1
Blacktown City	2004	9	5	–		–		9	5
Sydney FC	2005–06	10	1	3	0	–		13	1
Sydney FC	2006–07	17	0	3	1	5	0	25	1
Sydney FC	2007–08	15	0	2	0	–		17	0
Sydney FC	Total	42	1	8	1	5	0	55	2
Newcastle Jets	2008–09	11	1	–		–		11	1
Shanghai Shenhua	2009	25	1	–		6	1	31	2
JEF United Chiba	2010	15	0	–		–		15	0
JEF United Chiba	2011	29	1	2	0	–		31	1
JEF United Chiba	2012	9	2	–		–		9	2
JEF United Chiba	Total	53	3	2	0	0	0	55	3
Melbourne Victory	2011–12	10	1	–		–		10	1
Melbourne Victory	2012–13	22	8	–		–		22	8
Melbourne Victory	2013–14	21	4	–		5	1	26	5
Melbourne Victory	2014–15	20	1	2	0	–		22	1
Melbourne Victory	Total	73	14	2	0	5	1	80	15
Baniyas SC	2015–16	21	3	2	0	–		23	3
Baniyas SC	2016–17	22	2	1	0	–		23	2
Baniyas SC	Total	43	5	3	0	0	0	46	5
Melbourne Victory	2017–18	14	3	2	0	–		16	3
Al Ahli	2017–18	8	0	2	0	7	0	17	0
Hibernian	2018–19	28	0	3	0	–		31	0
Southend United	2019–20	30	0	3	0	—		33	0
Macarthur FC	2020–21	27	3	—		—		27	3
Career total		379	37	25	1	23	2	427	40

=== International ===
Appearances and goals by national team and year
National team	Year	Apps	Goals
Australia	2006	3	0
Australia	2007	2	0
Australia	2008	1	0
Australia	2009	2	0
Australia	2010	2	1
Australia	2011	2	0
Australia	2012	6	1
Australia	2013	8	0
Australia	2014	7	0
Australia	2015	11	2
Australia	2016	9	1
Australia	2017	11	1
Australia	2018	10	0
Australia	2019	6	0
Total		80	6

Scores and results list Australia's goal tally first, score column indicates score after each Milligan goal.

List of international goals scored by Mark Milligan
No.	Date	Venue	Opponent	Score	Result	Competition
1	3 March 2010	Suncorp Stadium, Brisbane, Australia	Indonesia	1–0	1–0	2011 AFC Asian Cup qualification
2	7 December 2012	Mong Kok Stadium, Mong Kok, Hong Kong	Guam	8–0	9–0	2013 EAFF East Asian Cup
3	13 January 2015	Stadium Australia, Sydney, Australia	Oman	3–0	4–0	2015 AFC Asian Cup
4	8 September 2015	Pamir Stadium, Dushanbe, Tajikistan	Tajikistan	1–0	3–0	2018 FIFA World Cup qualification
5	24 March 2016	Adelaide Oval, Adelaide, Australia	Tajikistan	3–0	7–0	2018 FIFA World Cup qualification
6	22 June 2017	Krestovsky Stadium, Saint Petersburg, Russia	Cameroon	1–1	1–1	2017 FIFA Confederations Cup

== Managerial statistics ==
As of match played 3 November 2026

Managerial record by team and tenure
Team	Nat.	From	To	Record								Ref.
Team	Nat.	From	To	G	W	D	L	GF	GA	GD	Win %	Ref.
Newcastle Jets	(Australia)	1 July 2025	Present	41	20	7	14	85	73	+12	48.78	
Career Total				41	20	7	14	85	73	+12	48.78	

^{1} A win or loss by the penalty shoot-out is regarded as the draw in time.

== Honours ==
Player

Sydney FC

- A-League Championship: 2005–06
- Australian Club World Championship Qualifying Tournament: 2005

Melbourne Victory

- A-League Championship: 2014–15
- A-League Premiership: 2014–15

Australia

- AFC Asian Cup: 2015

Australia U-20

- OFC U-20 Championship: 2005

Individual

- A-League PFA Team of the Season: 2012–13, 2013–14, 2014–15
- A-League PFA Team of the Decade: 2005–15
- Melbourne Victory FC Player of the Season: 2012–13
- Joe Marston Medal: 2015

Manager

Newcastle Jets

- Australia Cup: 2025
- A-League Premiership: 2025–26

Individual

- A-League Men Coach of the Year: 2025–26
