= Adam Federici =

Australian soccer player (born 1985)

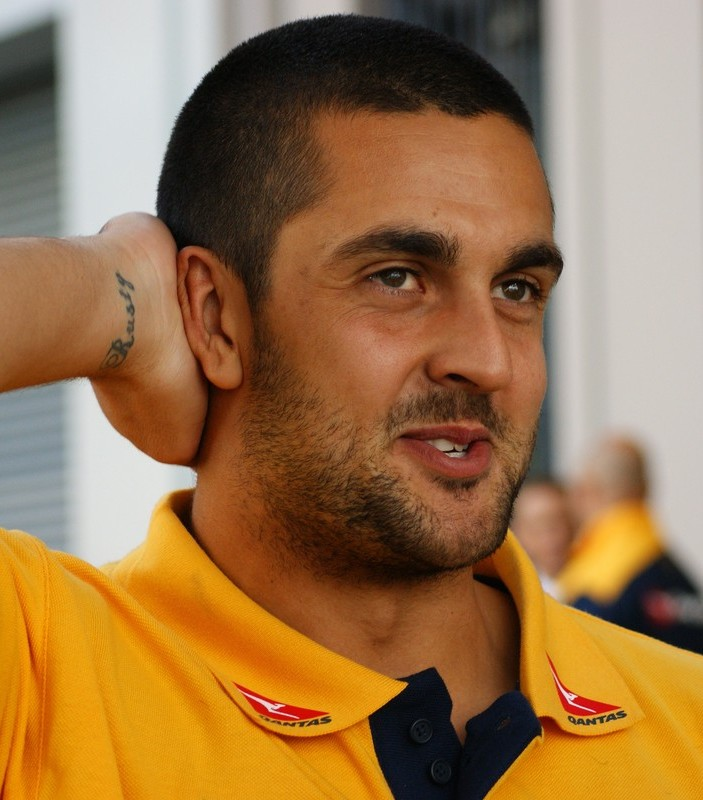
- Federici in 2008

Personal information
- Full name: Adam Jay Federici
- Date of birth: 31 January 1985 (age 41)
- Place of birth: Nowra, New South Wales, Australia
- Height: 1.88 m (6 ft 2 in)
- Position: Goalkeeper

Youth career
- Huskisson Seagulls
- NSWIS
- 2002: AIS

Senior career*
Years	Team	Apps	(Gls)
2003	Wolverhampton Wanderers	0	(0)
2003–2004	Torres	5	(0)
2005–2015	Reading	209	(1)
2005	→ Maidenhead United (loan)	15	(0)
2005–2006	→ Northwood (loan)	4	(0)
2005–2006	→ Carshalton Athletic (loan)	25	(0)
2006	→ Bristol City (loan)	0	(0)
2008	→ Southend United (loan)	10	(0)
2015–2018	AFC Bournemouth	8	(0)
2017	→ Nottingham Forest (loan)	0	(0)
2018–2020	Stoke City	8	(0)
2020–2021	Macarthur FC	28	(0)
Total		312	(1)

International career
2004–2005	Australia U20	5	(0)
2008	Australia U23	5	(0)
2010–2016	Australia	16	(0)
- * Club domestic league appearances and goals

Adam Jay Federici (born 31 January 1985) is an Australian former professional soccer player who played as a goalkeeper.

Federici began his senior career at Wolverhampton Wanderers in 2003, but was only there briefly and soon switched to Torres. After a reasonably successful season for the Italian side, he joined Reading in 2005, and, following loan spells at Maidenhead United, Northwood and Carshalton Athletic, turned fully professional in 2006. A brief loan spell to Bristol City followed, before Federici made his Reading debut during the 2006–07 season. However, he was still unable to dislodge Marcus Hahnemann from the starting position, and remained second choice, even going on loan to Southend United in 2008. However, after this loan spell, an injury to Hahnemann gave Federici a prolonged run in the team, and he remained first choice for several seasons. Federici spent ten seasons with the Royals before joining AFC Bournemouth in May 2015. He was used as second and third choice stopper at Dean Court and joined Stoke City in July 2018. He returned to Australia in July 2020, joining Macarthur, where he played for one season before retiring.

== Club career ==
=== Early career ===
Federici started his career at Huskisson Football Club, south-east of Nowra, and was part of the Australian Institute for Sport before moving to England at the age of 17. Federici had trials at Sheffield Wednesday and Bolton Wanderers before a trial at Wolverhampton Wanderers led to him signing on a non-contract basis in February 2003 for the remainder of the season. After a season at Italian club Torres, he returned to England, undergoing a trial at Leeds United but failing to earn a deal.

=== Reading ===
Federici signed for Reading in January 2005 on non-contract terms, and was quickly loaned out to Maidenhead. He spent the second half of the 2005–06 season on loan at Carshalton Athletic. Federici signed his first professional contract for Reading in the summer of 2006, and in a subsequent pre-season friendly match on 15 July, scored the only goal of the game against Bromley, having been played as a makeshift striker. He joined Bristol City on a loan deal on 29 August 2006, but was recalled on 27 October without making a first team appearance.

On 12 March 2007, Federici signed a two-year contract with Reading to keep him at the club until the end of the 2008–09 season. On 17 February 2007 a "second string" Reading side unexpectedly drew 1–1 with Manchester United during an FA Cup 5th Round tie at Old Trafford, with the young Aussie keeper making some fine saves in a memorable game for the club. For this performance, he was named the FA Cup "Player of the Round" for the 5th Round. However, in the replay on 27 February, Federici had a night to generally forget as Reading conceded three goals in the first six minutes.

Federici made his league debut in Reading's 1–0 defeat away to Tottenham Hotspur on 1 April 2007, where he came on as a substitute at half time due to a hip injury to first choice goalkeeper Marcus Hahnemann. Federici again featured as a half time substitute during a 3–3 draw at Blackburn Rovers after Marcus Hahnemann had injured his hand.

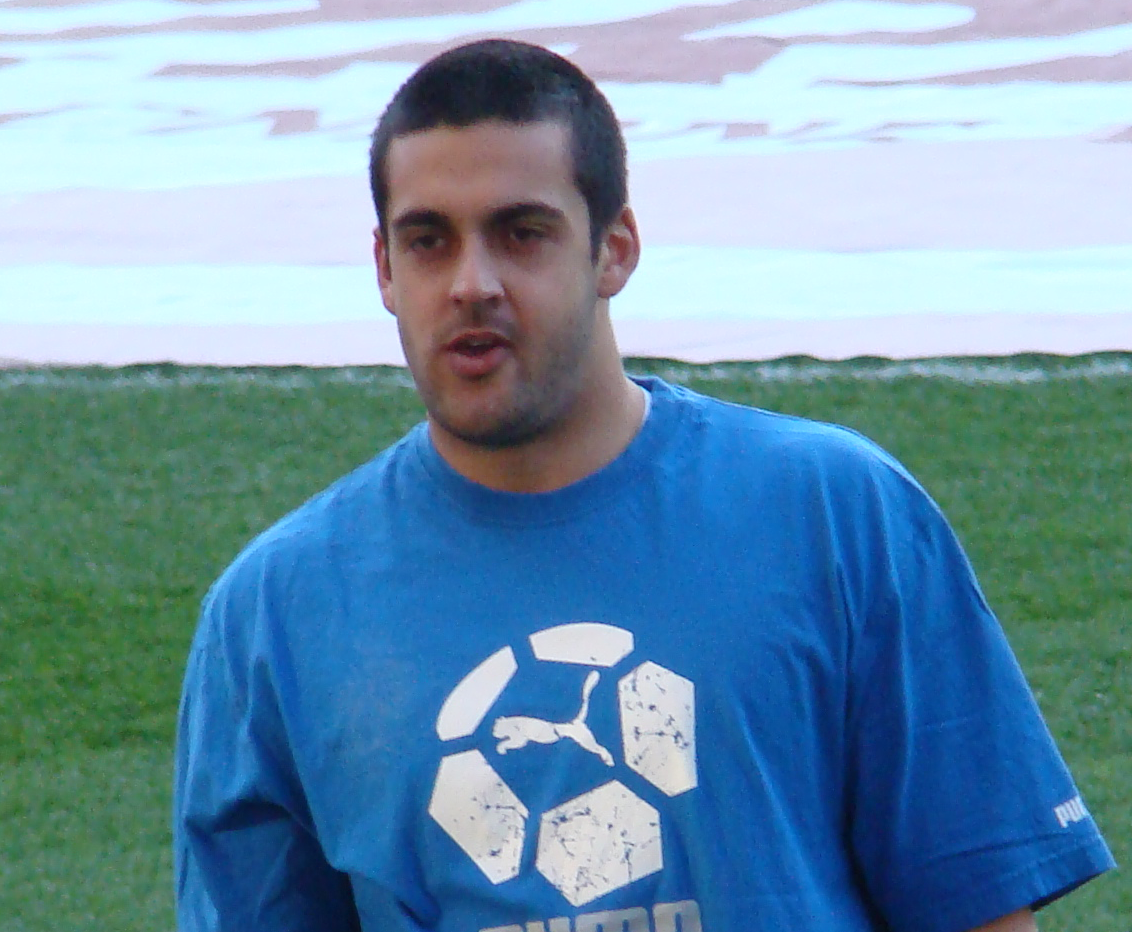
Federici in 2008.

Federici joined League One side Southend United on a month's loan on 25 September 2008, making his debut in a 3–0 victory over Leyton Orient the following day. The loan was extended for a further month in October, the keeper eventually returning to Reading after making 10 appearances for Southend.

In December, shortly after returning from his loan spell, Federici signed a contract extension, keeping him with the club until the summer of 2011. During December, Federici also started a run of first team appearances for Reading, due to a calf injury sustained by longtime first-choice stopper Marcus Hahnemann against Blackpool, keeping the American goalkeeper out for several weeks. After coming on as a late substitute in that game, Federici went on to make his full league debut between the posts against Norwich City, drawing praise from manager Steve Coppell for his performance. On 26 December 2008, Federici scored a 96th-minute goal from a rebound after Michael Duberry had a header cleared off the line from a Stephen Hunt corner, to give Reading a late equaliser in their 1–1 draw against Cardiff City.

For the new 2009–10 season Federici was given the Number 1 jersey after Marcus Hahnemann was released. He produced "two of the best saves" of his career in the Championship match against Swansea on 18 August 2009, saving a penalty and two close range shots in a match which Reading drew 0–0.

Federici was a key part of the Reading side that reached the FA Cup semi-finals in 2015, the first time Reading had reached the last four since 1927. In the semi-final, after making important saves throughout the match, Federici was at fault for Arsenal's extra-time winner from Alexis Sánchez as he allowed the shot to slip out of his hands and between his legs. Reading boss Steve Clarke defended and praised Federici after the match, saying they would not have even reached that stage without his efforts.

=== AFC Bournemouth ===
On 27 May 2015, Federici signed for AFC Bournemouth on a free transfer after his contract expired at Reading.

Bournemouth loaned Federici out to Nottingham Forest on 31 August 2017, in a deal that was scheduled to run until January 2018. His loan was rescinded on 11 September 2017, following an injury sustained on international duty that required surgery.

=== Stoke City ===
On 3 July 2018 Federici joined EFL Championship side Stoke City for an undisclosed fee. Federici spent the 2018–19 season as back-up to first choice Jack Butland playing in EFL Cup and FA Cup matches. His only Championship match came against Middlesbrough on 19 April 2019 with Butland absent due to parental leave. Federici began 2019–20 again as back-up to Butland, but played twice at the end of August after Stoke had made a bad start to the season with Butland making a number of errors. Butland was briefly restored as first-choice by Nathan Jones but some more errors lead to Federici playing in all the matches in October 2019. Jones was replaced by Michael O'Neill in November 2019 who reinstated Butland and Federici was moved to third choice. Federici was released by Stoke in July 2020 following the end of his contract.

=== Macarthur FC ===
In July 2020, Federici was announced as Macarthur FC's third signing ahead of their debut season in the A-League.

Federici was appointed club captain ahead of the 2021–22 Macarthur FC season, however, on 23 October 2021, shortly before the start of the season, he announced his retirement from professional football due to injury.

== International career ==
Federici played for the Australia U20 team in the 2005 FIFA World Youth Championship. He was invited to a training session with the senior Australia squad on 29 January 2007 prior to their friendly against Denmark in London, and then received his first full call up to the senior team for their match against Uruguay on 2 June 2007. Federici was also selected to play for Australia at the 2008 Beijing Olympic Games.

His first cap came just before the 2010 World Cup against New Zealand, and he was backup to Mark Schwarzer for Australia as an unused substitute for all three of their group games. He also had the option of playing for Marcello Lippi's Italy side due to his Italian ancestry. On 11 October 2011, Federici started in a World Cup Qualifier match against Oman where he made a great save from a free kick from Ahmed Mubarak. Australia went on to win 3–0.

== Career statistics ==
=== Club ===
Appearances and goals by club, season and competition
Club	Season	League			National cup		League Cup		Other		Total	
Club	Season	Division	Apps	Goals	Apps	Goals	Apps	Goals	Apps	Goals	Apps	Goals
Wolverhampton Wanderers	2002–03	First Division	0	0	0	0	0	0	0	0	0	0
Torres	2003–04	Serie C1	5	0	0	0	—		—		5	0
Reading	2004–05	Championship	0	0	0	0	0	0	—		0	0
Reading	2005–06	Championship	0	0	4	0	0	0	—		0	0
Reading	2006–07	Premier League	2	0	4	0	0	0	—		6	0
Reading	2007–08	Premier League	0	0	2	0	2	0	—		4	0
Reading	2008–09	Championship	15	1	1	0	2	0	0	0	18	1
Reading	2009–10	Championship	46	0	6	0	0	0	—		52	0
Reading	2010–11	Championship	34	0	2	0	0	0	3 (Note: Appearances in the Championship play-offs)	0	39	0
Reading	2011–12	Championship	46	0	1	0	0	0	—		47	0
Reading	2012–13	Premier League	21	0	3	0	2	0	—		26	0
Reading	2013–14	Championship	2	0	1	0	1	0	—		4	0
Reading	2014–15	Championship	43	0	5	0	1	0	—		49	0
Reading	Total		209	1	25	0	11	0	3	0	248	1
Maidenhead United (loan)	2004–05	Conference South	15	0	0	0	—		0	0	15	0
Northwood (loan)	2005–06	Southern Premier	4	0	0	0	—		1 (Note: Appearance in the Middlesex Charity Cup)	0	5	0
Carshalton Athletic (loan)	2005–06	Conference South	25	0	0	0	—		7 (Note: Four appearances in the FA Trophy and three appearances in the Surrey Senior Cup)	0	32	0
Bristol City (loan)	2006–07	League One	0	0	0	0	0	0	0	0	0	0
Southend United (loan)	2008–09	League One	10	0	0	0	0	0	0	0	10	0
AFC Bournemouth	2015–16	Premier League	6	0	3	0	3	0	—		12	0
AFC Bournemouth	2016–17	Premier League	2	0	1	0	2	0	—		5	0
AFC Bournemouth	2017–18	Premier League	0	0	0	0	0	0	—		0	0
AFC Bournemouth	Total		8	0	4	0	5	0	—		17	0
Nottingham Forest (loan)	2017–18	Championship	0	0	0	0	0	0	—		0	0
Stoke City	2018–19	Championship	1	0	2	0	2	0	—		5	0
Stoke City	2019–20	Championship	7	0	0	0	2	0	—		9	0
Stoke City	Total		8	0	2	0	4	0	—		14	0
Macarthur FC	2020–21	A-League	28	0	0	0	—		—		28	0
Career total			312	1	31	0	17	0	11	0	371	1

=== International ===
Appearances and goals by national team and year
National team	Year	Apps	Goals
Australia	2010	3	0
Australia	2011	3	0
Australia	2012	1	0
Australia	2013	1	0
Australia	2014	1	0
Australia	2015	6	0
Australia	2016	1	0
Total		16	0

== Honours ==
Reading

- Football League Championship: 2011–12

Individual

- Football League Championship Golden Glove: 2011–12
- Reading Player of the Season: 2014–15
- Reading F.C. Hall of Fame: 2022
- Football League Championship Player of the Month: February 2012
- A-League PFA Team of the Season: 2020–21
