= Lachlan Rose =

Australian soccer player

- Rose with Dundee United in 2026

Personal information
- Full name: Lachlan Rose
- Date of birth: 10 May 1999 (age 27)
- Place of birth: Sydney, Australia
- Height: 1.78 m (5 ft 10 in)
- Positions: Striker; right winger

Team information
- Current team: Dundee United
- Number: 15

Youth career
- Manly United

Senior career*
Years	Team	Apps	(Gls)
2016	NWS Spirit FC	1	(0)
2017–2018	Blacktown City	0	(0)
2019–2020	Blacktown Spartans	36	(10)
2020–2024	Macarthur FC	83	(9)
2024–2026	Newcastle Jets	43	(16)
2026–	Dundee United	12	(1)
- * Club domestic league appearances and goals as of 03:04, 26 January 2026 (UTC)

Lachlan Rose (born 10 May 1999) is an Australian professional soccer player who plays as a striker or right winger for Scottish Premiership club Dundee United.

== Early life ==
Rose was born on 10 May 1999. Born in Sydney, Australia.

== Club career ==
New A-League club Macarthur announced the signing of Rose for their inaugural 2020–21 A-League season in November 2020. He debuted for the club starting in their first ever A-League game against Western Sydney Wanderers on 30 December 2020, having a goal ruled offside. In March 2021, after playing in eight out of a possible ten league matches, Macarthur extended Rose's contract for another two years. He underwent ankle surgery while playing for the club.

After scoring seven of the club's 36 goals during the season, Rose was crowned as the Macarthur Medal Winner for 2022.

On 21 July 2024, Rose joined fellow A-League Men side Newcastle Jets on a two-year deal following a free transfer. He was regarded as a fan favorite while playing for the club.

Following an impressive 2 seasons, it was announced on the 17th of March 2026 that he had signed a pre-contract agreement with Scottish Premiership side Dundee United on a 2 year deal with the Scottish side holding an option to extend his contract for another year.

== Career statistics ==
As of match played 10 November 2026

Appearances and goals by club, season and competition
Club	Season	League			National Cup		Continental		Other		Total	
Club	Season	Division	Apps	Goals	Apps	Goals	Apps	Goals	Apps	Goals	Apps	Goals
North West Sydney Spirit FC	2016	National Premier Leagues NSW 2	1	0	–		–		–		1	0
Macarthur FC	2020–21	A-League Men	25	1	–		–		–		25	1
Macarthur FC	2021–22	A-League Men	25	4	2	2	–		–		27	6
Macarthur FC	2022–23	A-League Men	13	4	5	3	–		–		18	7
Macarthur FC	2023–24	A-League Men	20	0	2	2	6 (Note: Appearances in AFC Cup)	3	–		28	5
Macarthur FC	Total		83	9	9	7	6	3	0	0	98	19
Newcastle Jets	2024–25	A-League Men	18	8	2	0	–		–		20	8
Newcastle Jets	2025–26	A-League Men	26	8	4	0	–		–		21	8
Newcastle Jets	Total		44	16	6	0	0	0	0	0	50	16
Dundee United	2026–27	Scottish Premiership	12	1	0	0	0	0	5	3	17	4
Career total			140	26	15	7	6	3	5	3	166	39

== Honours ==
Macarthur

- Australia Cup: 2022

Newcastle Jets

- Australia Cup: 2025
- A-League Premiership: 2025–26

Individual

- Macarthur FC Player of the Year: 2022
- Newcastle Jets Craig Johnston Award: 2024–25
