= Kyle Cimenti =

Australian soccer player

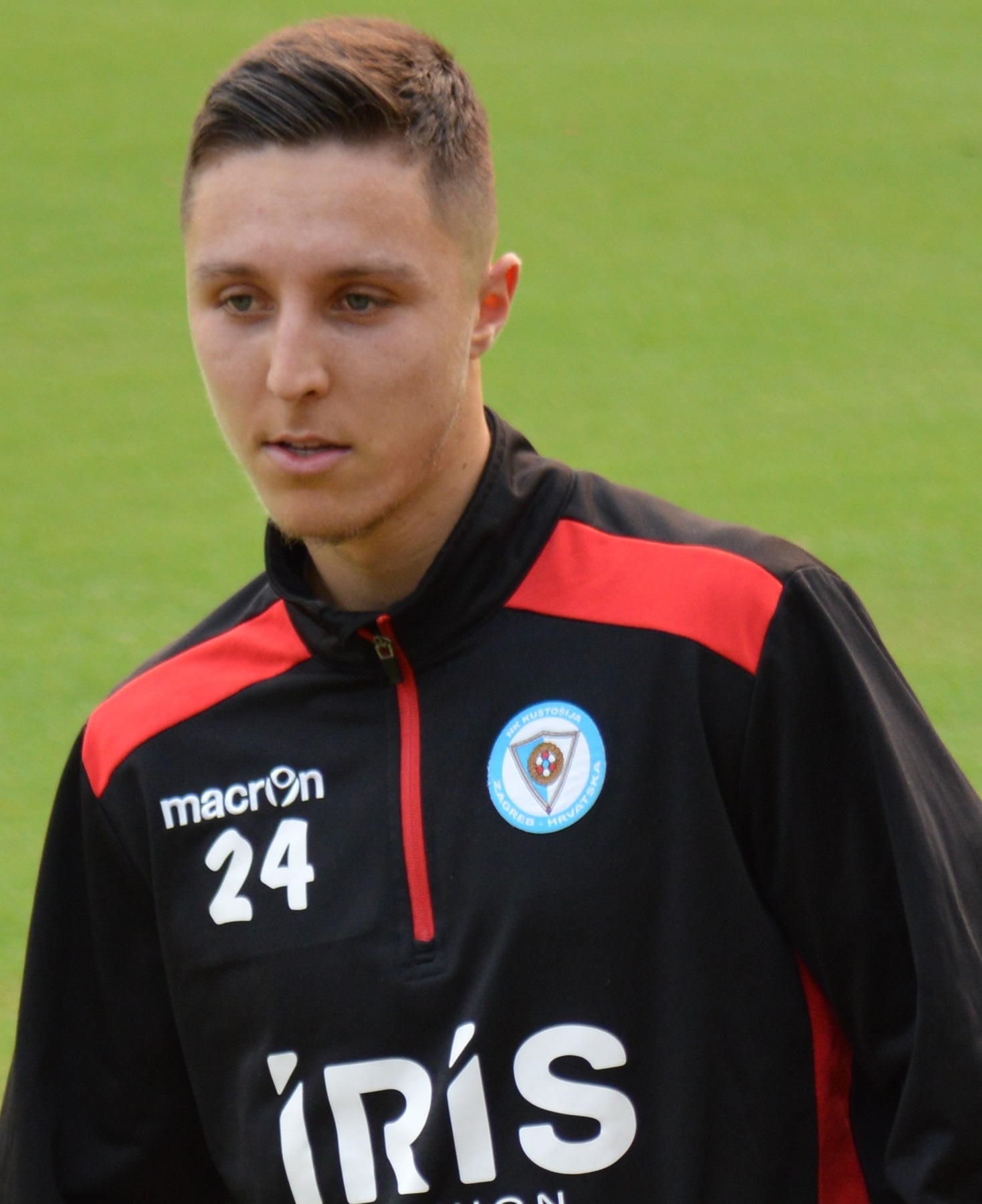

Personal information
- Full name: Kyle Cimenti
- Date of birth: 5 November 1998 (age 28)
- Place of birth: Camperdown, New South Wales, Australia
- Height: 1.84 m (6 ft 0 in)
- Position: Forward

Team information
- Current team: Sydney United 58
- Number: 9

Youth career
- FNSW NTC
- Sydney United 58
- Western Sydney Wanderers

Senior career*
Years	Team	Apps	(Gls)
2015	Sydney United 58	1	(0)
2016–2017	Western Sydney Wanderers NPL		
2018	Sydney United 58	3	(0)
2018	NK Spansko		
2018–2020	NK Kustošija	12	(1)
2020–2021	Rockdale Ilinden	13	(8)
2021	Macarthur FC	1	(0)
2021	→ Northbridge Bulls (loan)	3	(2)
2022	Sydney United 58	20	(6)
2023–2025	Marconi Stallions	61	(10)
2025–	Sydney United 58	26	(3)
- * Club domestic league appearances and goals as of 26 August 2026

Kyle Cimenti (born 5 November 1998) is an Australian professional soccer player who plays as a forward for Sydney United 58 in the Australian Championship and NPL NSW.

== Club career ==
After spending some time in the Western Sydney Wanderers youth setup, Cimenti signed for Sydney United 58 FC playing out the 2018 NPL NSW season. In October 2018 Cimenti first signed for NK Spansko later moving to NK Kustošija in 2019 in the Croatian HNL-2 second division .

Cimenti returned to Australia in 2020 and signed for Rockdale Ilinden FC where he scored 8 goals in 13 appearances over the course of the season. On 21 May 2021 he signed for A-League side Macarthur FC. He made his debut on 4 June 2021 against Wellington Phoenix FC.

Cimenti signed with Sydney United 58 for the 2022 Men's NSW National Premier League season.

== Honours ==
With Marconi Stallions:

- (Australia) NPL NSW Championship: 2024

With Sydney United 58:

- (Australia) NPL NSW Championship: 2026
- (Australia) Waratah Cup Champions: 2026
