= Milislav Popovic =

Australian soccer player

Personal information
- Date of birth: 6 March 1997 (age 29)
- Place of birth: Sydney, Australia
- Height: 1.90 m (6 ft 3 in)
- Position: Forward

Youth career
- –2013: Blacktown City
- 2013–2015: Lazio
- 2015–2016: TSV Havelse

Senior career*
Years	Team	Apps	(Gls)
2015–2016	TSV Havelse	4	(1)
2016–2017	FC Köln II	21	(0)
2017–2018	Eintracht Braunschweig II	29	(3)
2019–2020	SV Lafnitz	1	(0)
2020–2021	Macarthur FC	5	(0)
2021	→ Northbridge Bulls (loan)	4	(2)
2021–2022	Strumska Slava	21	(6)
2022–2023	Victoria Rosport	3	(0)
2024–2025	Marconi Stallions	23	(4)
2026	Sutherland Sharks	2	(0)

International career^{‡}
2017–2018	Australia U23	4	(0)
- * Club domestic league appearances and goals as of 15 September 2026 ‡ National team caps and goals as of 8 December 2019

Milislav Popovic (born 6 March 1997) is an Australian soccer player who last played as a forward for Sutherland Sharks in NPL NSW.

== Career statistics ==
=== Club ===
As of 8 December 2019.

Club	Season	League			Cup		Other		Total	
Club	Season	Division	Apps	Goals	Apps	Goals	Apps	Goals	Apps	Goals
TSV Havelse	2015–16	Regionalliga Nord	4	1	0	0	0	0	4	1
FC Köln II	2015–16	Regionalliga West	6	0	0	0	0	0	6	0
FC Köln II	2016–17	Regionalliga West	15	0	0	0	0	0	15	0
FC Köln II	Total		21	0	0	0	0	0	21	0
TSV Havelse	2017–18	Regionalliga Nord	29	3	0	0	0	0	29	3
SV Lafnitz	2019–20	2. Liga	1	0	0	0	0	0	1	0
Career total			55	4	0	0	0	0	55	4
