= Charles M'Mombwa =

Tanzanian footballer (born 1998)

Personal information
- Full name: Kokola Charles William M'Mombwa
- Date of birth: 14 March 1998 (age 28)
- Place of birth: Baraka, DR Congo
- Height: 1.74 m (5 ft 9 in)
- Position: Attacking midfielder

Team information
- Current team: Floriana
- Number: 24

Youth career
- Mt Druitt Town Rangers
- 2017: CCM Academy

Senior career*
Years	Team	Apps	(Gls)
2017–2019	CCM Academy	39	(27)
2018–2019	Central Coast Mariners	1	(0)
2020–2024	Macarthur FC	62	(2)
2025	Newcastle Jets	13	(1)
2025–	Floriana	25	(2)

International career^{‡}
2023–	Tanzania	16	(4)
- * Club domestic league appearances and goals as of 7 May 2026 ‡ National team caps and goals as of 27 December 2025

Kokola Charles William M'Mombwa (born 14 March 1998) is a professional footballer who plays as a midfielder for Maltese Premier League club Floriana. Born in the Democratic Republic of the Congo and raised in Tanzania and later Australia, he plays for the Tanzania national team.

M'Mombwa made his professional debut for Central Coast Mariners on 1 August 2018 in an FFA Cup match against Adelaide United, where he came on as a substitute for six minutes.

== Early life ==
M'Mombwa was born in Baraka, Democratic Republic of the Congo, on 14 March 1998. He and his family fled to Tanzania, where they stayed for more than a decade. They then resettled in Casula in southwestern Sydney.

M'Mombwa's father was both a football player and coach when he resided in DR Congo.

== Club career ==
=== Central Coast Mariners ===
After coming through the Mariners academy, M'Mombwa debuted for the club in an FFA Cup match against Adelaide United. He played his first and only A-League game for Central Coast in their 8–2 loss against Wellington Phoenix FC.

=== Macarthur FC ===
On 20 November 2020, Macarthur FC announced the signing of M'Mombwa for their inaugural season.

On 12 June 2020, M'Mombwa scored the first of Macarthur FC's two goals in their extra time 2–0 win against Central Coast Mariners, in the 2020–21 A-League Finals series. This was the club's first win in an A-League Finals match.

After 4 seasons at Macarthur, M'Mombwa was released by the club at the end of the 2023–24 season.

=== Newcastle Jets ===
After 8 months as a free agent, M'Mombwa joined Newcastle Jets in the January transfer window of the 2024–25 A-League season.

=== Floriana ===
On 23 June 2025, Floriana announced the signing of M’Mombwa for 2025–26 season.

== International career ==
M'Mombwa was called up to the Tanzania national team for a set of 2026 FIFA World Cup qualification matches in November 2023. He scored the only goal for his country on his debut in a 1–0 win over Niger on 18 November 2023.

=== International goals ===
Scores and results list Tanzania's goal tally first.

No.	Date	Venue	Opponent	Score	Result	Competition
1.	18 November 2023	Stade de Marrakech, Marrakesh, Morocco	Niger	1–0	1–0	2026 FIFA World Cup qualification
2.	15 November 2025	Cairo International Stadium, Cairo, Egypt	Kuwait	1–0	3–4	Friendly
3.	15 November 2025	Cairo International Stadium, Cairo, Egypt	Kuwait	3–4	3–4	Friendly
4.	23 December 2025	Fez Stadium, Fez, Morocco	Nigeria	1–1	1–2	2025 Africa Cup of Nations
5.	29 March 2026	Kigali Pelé Stadium, Kigali, Rwanda	Macau	1–0	6–0	2026 FIFA Series

== Honours ==
Macarthur FC

- Australia Cup: 2022
