= Liam Rose =

Australian soccer player (born 1997)

Personal information
- Full name: Liam Joseph Rose
- Date of birth: 7 April 1997 (age 29)
- Place of birth: Baulkham Hills, New South Wales, Australia
- Height: 1.75 m (5 ft 9 in)
- Position: Defensive midfielder

Team information
- Current team: Macarthur FC
- Number: 22

Youth career
- NSWIS
- 2012–2013: AIS

Senior career*
Years	Team	Apps	(Gls)
2013	AIS	14	(0)
2014–2018	Central Coast Mariners	71	(0)
2016–2018	CCM Academy	2	(1)
2018–2019	Ararat-Armenia	6	(0)
2019–2020	Sydney United 58	27	(1)
2020–2022	Macarthur FC	32	(0)
2021–2022	Northbridge Bulls	7	(0)
2022–2024	El Paso Locomotive	60	(1)
2024–	Macarthur FC	44	(1)

International career^{‡}
2012	Australia U17	6	(0)
2014–2016	Australia U20	15	(0)
Medal record
Men's football
Representing Australia
AFF U-19 Youth Championship
First place	2016 Vietnam	U-20 Team
- * Club domestic league appearances and goals as of 28 April 2026 ‡ National team caps and goals as of 22 October 2016

Liam Joseph Rose (born 7 April 1997) is an Australian professional soccer player who plays as a defensive midfielder for A-League Men club Macarthur FC, which he captains.

== Early life ==
Rose was born on 7 April 1997 in Baulkham Hills, a suburb of the Hills District in Sydney, New South Wales. He is of English and Italian descent. He was educated at Bossley Park High School (BPHS), a public high school in the Western Sydney suburb of Bossley Park.

== Club career ==
=== Central Coast Mariners ===
Rose was signed alongside fellow AIS scholarship holder Anthony Kalik on full senior contracts by then Central Coast Mariners' coach Graham Arnold. He made his professional A-League debut as a second-half substitute in a 2–1 win over Adelaide United on 7 February 2015. On 18 April 2018, following the end of his contract, Central Coast Mariners announced that Rose's contact would not be renewed.

=== Ararat-Armenia ===
Following his release from the Mariners, Rose moved to Armenia to play for FC Ararat-Armenia.

=== Sydney United 58 ===
In 2019, Rose returned to Australia and joined Sydney United 58 FC.

=== Macarthur FC ===
Rose featured in a friendly match for new A-League club Macarthur FC on 25 October 2020 where he scored a first-half goal against NPL NSW4 club Camden Tigers. The following day, the club announced they had signed Rose.

=== El Paso Locomotive ===
On May 16, 2022, El Paso Locomotive FC announced Rose's signing for the remainder of the 2022 USL Championship season.

== Career statistics ==
=== Club ===
As of match played 15 June 2024

Appearances and goals by club, season and competition
Club	Season	League			National Cup		Continental		Other		Total	
Club	Season	Division	Apps	Goals	Apps	Goals	Apps	Goals	Apps	Goals	Apps	Goals
Central Coast Mariners	2014–15	A-League	7	0	0	0	0	0	–		7	0
Central Coast Mariners	2015–16	A-League	24	0	1 (Note: Appearance(s) in Australia Cup)	0	–		–		25	0
Central Coast Mariners	2016–17	A-League	22	0	1	0	–		–		23	0
Central Coast Mariners	2017–18	A-League	18	0	1	0	–		–		19	0
Central Coast Mariners	Total		71	0	3	0	0	0	-	-	74	0
Ararat-Armenia	2018–19	Armenian Premier League	6	0	0	0	–		–		6	0
Ararat-Armenia	Total		6	0	0	0	0	0	-	-	6	0
Sydney United 58 FC	2019	National Premier Leagues	24	1	0	0	–		–		24	1
Sydney United 58 FC	2020	National Premier Leagues	3	0	0	0	–		–		3	0
Sydney United 58 FC	Total		27	1	0	0	0	0	-	-	27	1
Macarthur FC	2020-21	A-League	15	0	0	0	–		–		15	0
Macarthur FC	2021-22	A-League	17	0	0	0	–		–		17	0
Northbridge FC	2022	National Premier Leagues	7	0	0	0	–		–		7	0
Northbridge FC	Total		39	0	0	0	0	0	-	-	39	0
El Paso Locomotive FC	2022	USL Championship	12	0	0	0	–		–		12	0
El Paso Locomotive FC	2023	USL Championship	33	1	0	0	1	0	–		34	1
El Paso Locomotive FC	2024	USL Championship	15	0	1	0	0	0	–		16	0
El Paso Locomotive FC	Total		60	1	1	0	1	0	-	-	62	1
Career total			203	1	5	0	0	0	-	-	208	1

== Honours ==
=== Country ===
Australia

- AFF U-19 Youth Championship: 2016

=== Club ===
Macarthur FC

- Australia Cup: 2024

=== Individual ===
- Mariners Medal: 2015–16
- Macarthur Medal: 2025-26
