= Macarthur FC =

Association football club in Australia

- Full name: Macarthur Football Club
- Nickname: The Bulls
- Founded: 20 August 2018; 8 years ago as Macarthur South West United; 15 May 2019; 7 years ago as Macarthur
- Ground: Campbelltown Stadium
- Capacity: 17,500
- Owner(s): Roy Mammone; Gino Marra
- Chairman: Gino Marra
- Head coach: Sasa Ognenovski
- League: A-League Men
- 2025–26: 7th of 12
- Website: macarthurfc.com.au
Home colours	Away colours

Macarthur Football Club, also known as Macarthur Bulls, is an Australian professional football club based in South Western Sydney, New South Wales. It competes in Australia's premier football competition, the A-League, under licence from Australian Professional Leagues (APL). On 13 December 2018, it was announced that the club would be accepted into the A-League as part of the new expansion process.

== History ==
=== Formation ===
On 1 December 2017, Campbelltown City Council informed the Football Federation Australia (FFA) of their plans to be part of an expanded A-League by gaining entry into the competition in two years. Initially called the South West Sydney Football Bid, the bid was intended, by the 2019–2020 season, to have a men, women and youth team playing in a national competition with games hosted at Campbelltown Sports Stadium. It was also proposed to grow the football community in the region and ensure young players a pathway into the professional league for both boys and girls. The proposal by the council soon gained support from other committees in the ensuing months, namely Camden and Wollondilly Shire, and from the Macarthur Football Association, which represented dozens of community clubs and over 10,000 registered players in the region. Brett Emerton, who was raised in Macquarie Fields, Campbelltown, became the bid ambassador and Lang Walker, billionaire and executive chairman of Walker Corporation, was named business ambassador in April 2018. Walker pledged to financially invest in the club if the bid succeeded, including upgrades towards Campbelltown Sports Stadium and its facilities. The bid was dubbed "United for Macarthur" and launched that month to allow local businesses and people to support a community-based and owned team proposal.

By the deadline date for expression of interest on 25 May 2018, 15 were submitted with three Sydney-based proposals being introduced. The "United for Macarthur" campaign gained further support from A-League club Sydney FC and its chairman, Scott Barlow, who also issued criticism towards the Southern Expansion (Sutherland-St George Illawarra regions) proposal that he stated was "deeply flawed". On 29 June 2018, Macarthur was accepted into the reduced ten-bid shortlist to compete for two new places in the expanded A-League from 2019 to 2020. Macarthur merged with South West Sydney Football Club to increase their chances of being selected, following an agreement between South West Sydney director Gino Marra and Macarthur bid chairman Chris Redman, who would act as co-chairmen from there. The merger was announced on 21 August 2018 and was named "Macarthur South West Sydney". On 17 October 2018, The FFA again accepted the Macarthur South West Sydney bid into another reduced shortlist of six proposals with now only one other New South Wales bid remaining: Southern Expansion. Prior to the final decision, the Southern Expansion bid attempted a merger with Macarthur which included $20 million in the offer that was rejected by Gino Marra. The FFA announced on 13 December 2018 that Macarthur South West Sydney alongside Western Melbourne were confirmed to be the two new expansion clubs in the next two A-League seasons.

While the Melbourne side was set to start in the 2019–20 season, Macarthur South West Sydney was given 12 months to prepare before their inaugural season in the 2020–21 season. It wasn't until April 2019 that the club registered their first potential name, which was initially thought to be "Dharawal Bulls Football Club". Two other draft names under the moniker of Dharawal were found, such as Dharawal Football Club or Dharawal, linking to the original custodians of their land, the Dharawal. In spite of this, the club announced on 15 May 2019 in a function at Campbelltown Catholic Club, revealing the official name to be "Macarthur FC", with its official colours to be black, gold and white, a notion to the diverse cultures of the area, and their logo to signify a bull in its centre, a sign of the club's physical power. Macarthur also announced their home ground to be Campbelltown Sports Stadium and its training headquarters to be based at a new Centre of Excellence, which was under construction at the time. The facilities at the University of Western Sydney in Campbelltown were instead used temporarily as the training headquarters. On the same day as their unveiling, Ante Milicic was announced as the inaugural head coach of Macarthur and was set to start in the club's first season. A week prior, Milicic signed an extension with the Matildas for the Summer Olympic in Tokyo. He was also rumoured to have rejected the contract by Macarthur due to this.

=== Milicic era (2020–2022) ===
Ante Milicic officially joined Macarthur as the inaugural head coach on 22 January 2020; Ivan Jolić was the inaugural assistant coach under Milicic and was hired in October 2019 prior. Macarthur also secured the signing of their first player with Central Coast Mariners' winger Tommy Oar. The club announced his signing on 4 February 2020, alongside the appointment of former Socceroos striker Mile Sterjovski as second assistant coach. Macarthur went through significant changes in the next month. Lang Walker sold his 50% ownership stake in the club to a consortium of two local Sydney businessmen. Michael Gerace, who owns Sydney Trucks and Machinery, and Roy Mammone, a Sydney property developer, bought the 50% stake for an undisclosed fee of over $7 million. The departure of Lang followed with chairman Rabieh Krayem resigning from his position and football director Ken Stead, who had been leading Macarthur's football department, was made redundant from the club. Gino Marra soon took over as chairman of Macarthur. On 2 June 2020, Macarthur was taken to court after being sued by former employees at the club, who are accusing them of having suffered mental health damage during their employment. Due to the change in ownership in February, both Ken Stead and Neil Favager, who was a chief executive at the club, took legal action in accusing the club of inconsideration of their mental health and positions at the club, with Favager stating that it caused "significant health and safety issues" for him and heightened stress and anxiety for his spouse, which was aggravated by a pre-existing medical issue. Macarthur later denied these allegations.

Milicic continued to expand the squad with the signings of Denis Genreau, Adam Federici, Mark Milligan, and Matt Derbyshire. Milligan signed as Macarthur's first marquee player, while Derbyshire became the first overseas player signed by the Bulls. Macarthur announced further signings with Milislav Popovic, Ivan Franjic, and Nicholas Suman coming in to reinforce the squad. Macarthur also announced on 21 August 2020 that Fairfield Showground would become the new training base for the club in the upcoming season after coming to an agreement with Fairfield City Council. In October 2020, Aleksandar Šušnjar, Moudi Najjar, Aleksandar Jovanovic, and Jake Hollman were announced by the club as new signings. Šušnjar became the 10th player signing under Milicic. Frenchmen Loïc Puyo was signed and announced on 19 October 2020 as the club's second international player after Derbyshire's announcement. Cypriot-Australian footballer Antonis Martis was also announced, just two days later, coming in on a season-long loan from Danish club Midtjylland. Mark Milligan was appointed as Macarthur's first club captain in their history on 23 October 2020. Macarthur played their first-ever match, a friendly against Camden Tigers at Ron Dine Memorial Reserve in Camden. The Bulls triumphed 6–0 with Liam Rose scoring the club's first goal in the match which was extended by Michael Ruhs and Jake Hollman. Before the finalisation of the final squad for the upcoming season, Macarthur signed additional players for further depth and strength. Spanish duo and former Athletic teammates, Beñat Etxebarria and Markel Susaeta, signed for the Bulls on 13 and 18 November 2020 respectively. Antony Golec, Lachlan Rose, and James Meredith were among the last signings made by the club before the opening match of the 2020–21 A-League season.

Macarthur played their first league match on 30 December 2020, in a derby match against Western Sydney Wanderers at Western Sydney Stadium. The Bulls went on to win 1–0 over the Wanderers, with Mark Milligan scoring the first league goal for the club in the 72nd minute of the match, assisted by Beñat from a free kick. Macarthur then played their first league match at Campbelltown against Central Coast Mariners on 3 January 2021, losing 2–0 in front of a home crowd of 4,538. The club would go winless in their next three home matches before a 4–0 win over Adelaide United led the Bulls to achieve their first victory at home. Matt Derbyshire scored the first hat-trick for the club. Notably, NSW Premier Gladys Berejiklian was unveiled as Macarthur's number 1 ticket holder prior to the match. Milicic led his side towards top 6 of the A-League ladder, peaking at second to third place by March, and finishing at 6th by the end of the league season. From the end of March to early April, Macarthur achieved three consecutive victories, triumphing over Western United, Wellington Phoenix and Perth Glory, leading them to take second place behind the Mariners. In their first finals series match, Macarthur FC defeated Central Coast Mariners 2–0 in extra time. The club went down to 10 men after James Meredith was sent off in the 75th minute before a goal each in extra time by Charles M'Mombwa and Michael Ruhs sealed the Bulls qualification to the semi-final. Macarther would fall to a 2–0 defeat against eventual champions Melbourne City in that semi-final stage on 20 June 2023. The venue was set at Jubilee Stadium, instead of City's home ground in Melbourne, due to crowd restrictions imposed as a result of the COVID-19 pandemic in Victoria.

Following the conclusion of the season, Mark Milligan announced his retirement on 2 June 2021, making 24 competitive appearances for the Bull prior to the announcement. Both Beñat Etxebarria and Markel Susaeta would later announce their retirement on 29 June 2021. Four days prior, Macarthur FC confirmed the departure of Ivan Franjic, Loic Puyo, Walter Scott, Yianni Nicolaou, Milislav Popovic and Kyle Cimenti from their squad. Denis Genreau became the first recipient of the Macarthur Medal as part of Macarthur FC's inaugural end of season award ceremony. Matt Derbyshire finished as top goalscorer for the club, having scored 14 goals during the season, with 7 of those in his first 12 A-League games.

=== 2023–present ===
On 1 October 2022, Macarthur won the Australia Cup for the first time in their history, beating Sydney United 58 2–0 in the final. The game was played at Commbank Stadium in front of 16,461 fans. Two years later, at AAMI Park, Melbourne Macarthur defeated the home favourites Melbourne Victory 1–0 in front of 13,289 fans to win their second Australia Cup final which sees the team qualified to the 2023–24 AFC Cup

In the 2023–24 AFC Cup, Macarthur was drawn in Group F alongside Myanmar club Shan United, Philippines club Dynamic Herb Cebu and Cambodian club Phnom Penh Crown Macarthur won their first ever match in AFC competition on 21 September 2023 after defeating Shan United 3–0 in Yangon. In the next match of the AFC Cup, Macarthur recorded their highest win in the tournament after thrashing 8–2 against Dynamic Herb Cebu at home. Macarthur went on to qualified to the Zonal semi-finals after qualifying as group leaders. In the Zonal semi-finals, Macarthur faced off against Malaysian club Sabah at home defeating them 3–0 and facing against Central Coast Mariners in the ASEAN Zonal final felled to a defeat in extra time to the opponents.

On 29 September 2024, Macarthur won their second Australia Cup in the 2024 edition beating Melbourne Victory 1–0 with Marin Jakoliš scoring the only goal in the final. This qualified Macarthur to the 2025–26 AFC Champions League Two, in which tournament they progressed through the group stage, but were eliminated after a two-legged tie against Bangkok United in the round of 16.

== Colours and badge ==
The logo designed by Twosome Creative, and depicts a black and gold ochre bull which is contained in a crest where the inner border is black and the outer gold ochre with the club's name written in the aforementioned colours above the bull and three federation stars at the bottom. The bull makes reference to the region where a runaway herd of cattle was discovered in its past. The federation stars symbolise the soccer community in Australia, the National Premier Leagues and the A-League. The logo features mainly black and white with the addition of gold ochre to highlight the Dharawal heritage of the area.

== Sponsorship ==
Period	Kit Manufacturer	Shirt Sponsor	Back Sponsor
2020–2021	(Italy) Macron	(Australia) Wisdom Homes	None
2021–2022	(Italy) Macron	(Australia) Wisdom Homes	Pennytel
2022–2023	(Spain) Kelme	(Australia) ALAND (Note: Titanium Waste Technology during the AFC Cup competition)	STM Trucks and Machinery
2023–2024	(Spain) Kelme	(Australia) Pennytel	STM Trucks and Machinery, eToro (league sponsor)
2024–2025	(Spain) Kelme	(Australia) SipEnergy	STM Trucks and Machinery, eToro (league sponsor)

== Win–loss record ==
Opponent	Played	Won	Drawn	Lost	Win %
Perth Glory	7	4	2	1	57.1
Brisbane Roar	6	3	1	2	50.0
Adelaide United	6	3	0	3	50.0
Newcastle Jets	8	3	2	3	37.5
Western Sydney Wanderers	8	3	3	2	37.5
Melbourne Victory	6	2	0	4	33.3
Wellington Phoenix	8	3	2	3	37.5
Sydney FC	8	3	1	4	37.5
Central Coast Mariners	10	3	1	6	30.0
Western United	7	2	3	2	28.6
Melbourne City	7	0	2	5	0.0
Auckland City	2	0	0	2	0.0

== Rivalries ==
Macarthur has a rivalry with the Western Sydney Wanderers. The rivalry is largely based on geography, with both teams based in Greater Western Sydney. The two clubs first met in the opening round of the 2020–21 A-League season on 30 December 2020, with Macarthur winning the match 1–0 after a goal scored by Mark Milligan. On 6 February 2021, in the following derby, Macarthur drew 2–2 at home with goals by Aleksandar Jovanovic and Aleksandar Šušnjar.

Macarthur FC vs. Western Sydney Wanderers

Overall								Home						Away					
Pld	W	D	L	GF	GA	GD	Pts	W	D	L	GF	GA	GD	W	D	L	GF	GA	GD
17	6	4	7	24	35	−11	22	2	4	3	15	20	−5	4	0	4	9	15	−6

== Stadium ==
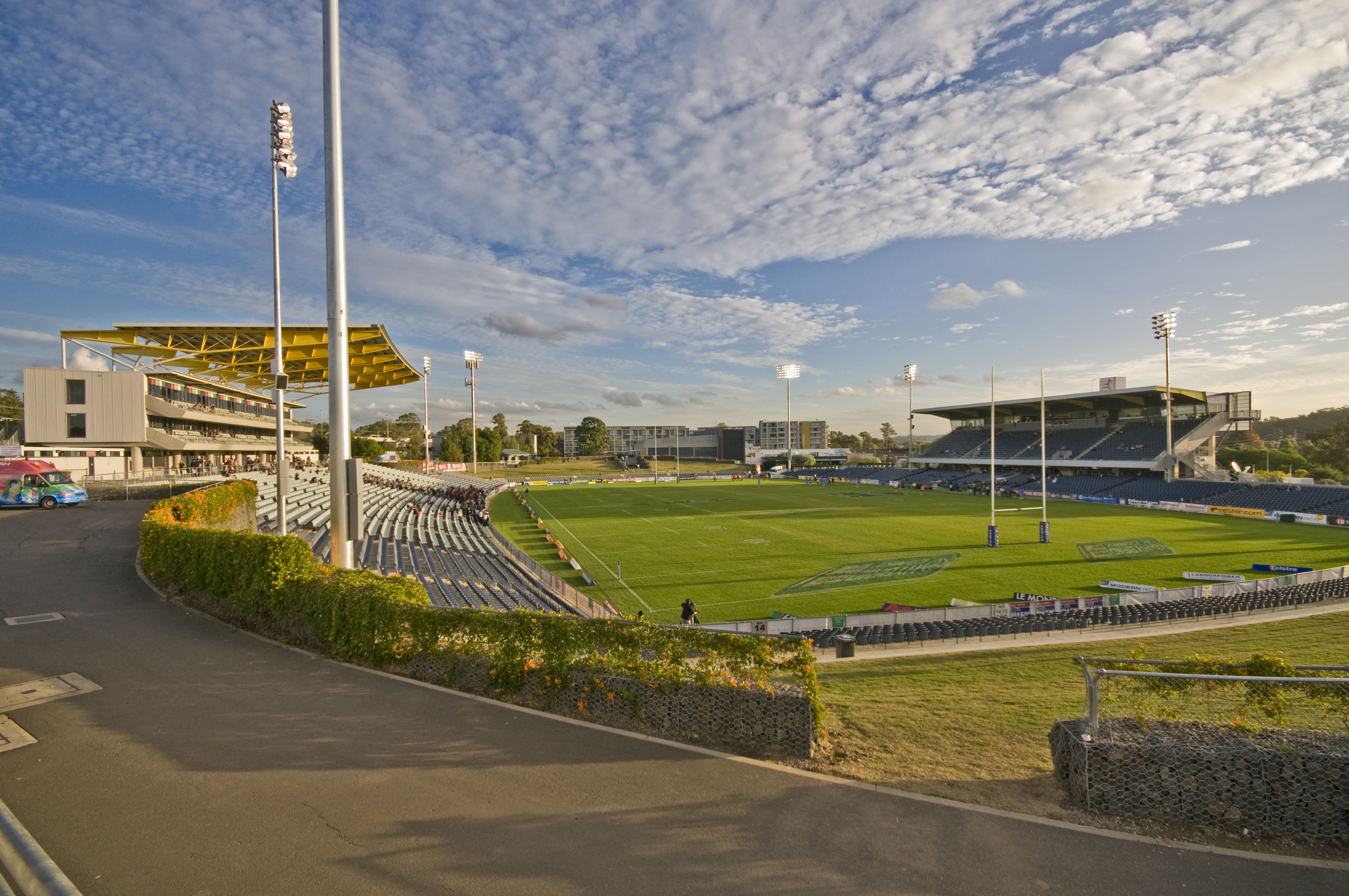
Campbelltown Stadium

=== Location ===
Location	Stadium	Capacity	Year
Campbelltown, New South Wales	Campbelltown Stadium	20,000	2020–present

== Players ==
=== First team squad ===
As of 17 September 2026

Note: Flags indicate national team as defined under FIFA eligibility rules; some limited exceptions apply. Players may hold more than one non-FIFA nationality.

No.	Pos.	Nation	Player
1	GK	AUS	Alexander Robinson
3	DF	JPN	Tatsuki Nara (on loan from Avispa Fukuoka)
5	DF	AUS	Jonathan Aspropotamitis
6	FW	SCO	Kai Kennedy
7	MF	AUS	Connor Pain
8	FW	IDN	Luke Vickery
9	FW	AUS	Ben Gibson
10	FW	SCO	Ryan Fraser
11	FW	AUS	Bernardo Oliveira
13	GK	AUS	James Hilton
14	FW	AUS	Michael Pratezina (scholarship)
16	FW	AUS	Apostolos Stamatelopoulos
17	MF	AUS	Oliver Randazzo
18	MF	AUS	Dylan Rose

No.	Pos.	Nation	Player
19	DF	AUS	Harry Politidis
20	FW	AUS	Henrique Oliveira (scholarship)
21	DF	AUS	Nathan Paull
22	MF	AUS	Liam Rose (captain)
23	MF	AUS	Kosta Grozos
24	FW	AUS	Dean Bosnjak
25	DF	AUS	Callum Talbot (vice-captain)
27	FW	AUS	Jing Reec
29	FW	AUS	Zane Helweh (scholarship)
31	DF	AUS	Sebastian Krslović (scholarship)
32	DF	AUS	Will McKay (scholarship)
33	DF	AUS	Harry Menham (scholarship)
99	FW	AUS	Musa Touré

=== Youth ===
Players to have been featured in a first-team matchday squad for Macarthur FC from their National Premier Leagues NSW affiliate Bulls FC Academy.

Note: Flags indicate national team as defined under FIFA eligibility rules; some limited exceptions apply. Players may hold more than one non-FIFA nationality.

No. / Pos. / Nation / Player; 30 / GK / LBN / Joshua Lakkis	No. / Pos. / Nation / Player; 34 / DF / AUS / Sonny Sterjovski

=== Out on loan ===
Note: Flags indicate national team as defined under FIFA eligibility rules; some limited exceptions apply. Players may hold more than one non-FIFA nationality.

No.	Pos.	Nation	Player
35	MF	AUS	Ali El-Sabeh (on loan at Sydney United until end of 2026 Australian Championship Season)
36	MF	AUS	Trypp McLachlan (on loan at Sydney United until end of 2026 Australian Championship Season)

== Coaching staff ==
Football department

Position	Name	Ref.
Head coach	(Australia) Saša Ognenovski	
Assistant Coach	(Australia) Damir Prodanović	
Assistant coach	(Switzerland) Bruno Berner	
Head of high performance	(Japan) Jun Arima	
Goalkeeping coach	(New Zealand) Glen Moss	

=== Formers & current managers ===
- (Australia) Ante Miličić (2020–2022)
- (Trinidad and Tobago) Dwight Yorke (2022–2023)
- (Australia) Mile Sterjovski (2023–2026)
- (Australia) Saša Ognenovski (2026–)

== Club captains ==
Dates	Name	Notes	Honours (as captain)
2020–2021	(Australia) Mark Milligan	Inaugural club captain	
2021–2024	(Mexico) Ulises Dávila	First foreign captain	2022 Australia Cup
2024–2025	(France) Valère Germain		2024 Australia Cup
2025–2026	(Australia) Luke Brattan		

== Honours ==
=== Domestic ===
Chart of yearly table positions for Macarthur FC in A-League Men

==== Cups ====
- Australia Cup
  - Winners (2): 2022, 2024

== Continental record ==
Season	Competition	Round	Club	Home	Away	Aggregate
2023–24	AFC Cup	Group F	(Myanmar) Shan United	4–0	3–0	1st out of 4
2023–24	AFC Cup	Group F	(Philippines) Dynamic Herb Cebu	8–2	3–0	1st out of 4
2023–24	AFC Cup	Group F	(Cambodia) Phnom Penh Crown	5–0	0–3	1st out of 4
2023–24	AFC Cup	ASEAN Zonal semi-finals	(Malaysia) Sabah	3–0	—N/a	—N/a
2023–24	AFC Cup	ASEAN Zonal final	(Australia) Central Coast Mariners	2–3 (a.e.t.)	—N/a	—N/a
2025–26	AFC Champions League Two	Group E	(China) Beijing Guoan	3–0	2–1	1st out of 4
2025–26	AFC Champions League Two	Group E	(Hong Kong) Tai Po	2–1	1–2	1st out of 4
2025–26	AFC Champions League Two	Group E	(Vietnam) Công An Hà Nội	2–1	1–1	1st out of 4
2025–26	AFC Champions League Two	Round of 16	(Thailand) Bangkok United	2–2	0–2	2–4

== See also ==
- Expansion of the A-League Men
