= 2025–26 Macarthur FC season =

Macarthur FC
2025–26 season
- Manager: Mile Sterjovski
- Stadium: Campbelltown Sports Stadium
- A-League Men: 7th
- A-League Men Finals: DNQ
- Australia Cup: Quarter-final
- AFC Champions League Two: Round of 16
- Top goalscorer: League: Harry Sawyer (6); All: Harry Sawyer (9)
- Highest home attendance: 7,605 vs. Western Sydney Wanderers (1 November 2025); A-League Men
- Lowest home attendance: 1,544 vs. Tai Po (27 November 2025); AFC Champions League Two
- Average home league attendance: 4,193
- Biggest win: 5–0 vs. Southern Districts Raiders (H) (29 July 2025); Australia Cup
- Biggest defeat: 0–4 vs. Western Sydney Wanderers (H) (28 February 2026); A-League Men
| Home colours | Away colours |
- All statistics correct as of 24 April 2026.

The 2025–26 season was Macarthur Football Club's sixth season in the A-League Men. In addition to the domestic league, Macarthur FC participated in this season's editions of the Australia Cup and the AFC Champions League Two.

== Players ==
Note: Flags indicate national team as defined under FIFA eligibility rules; some limited exceptions apply. Players may hold more than one non-FIFA nationality.

| No. | Pos. | Nation | Player |
|---|---|---|---|
| 1 | GK | AUS | Alexander Robinson |
| 3 | DF | FRA | Damien Da Silva |
| 5 | DF | AUS | Matthew Jurman |
| 6 | DF | AUS | Tomislav Uskok |
| 7 | FW | CRO | Šime Gržan |
| 8 | FW | AUS | Luke Vickery |
| 9 | FW | AUS | Chris Ikonomidis |
| 10 | MF | AUS | Anthony Caceres |
| 11 | FW | AUS | Bernardo Oliveira |
| 12 | GK | POL | Filip Kurto |
| 13 | FW | MEX | Rafael Durán |
| 14 | MF | AUS | Kristian Popovic |
| 15 | FW | AUS | Mitchell Duke |
| 17 | MF | AUS | Oliver Randazzo |
| 18 | DF | AUS | Walter Scott |

| No. | Pos. | Nation | Player |
|---|---|---|---|
| 19 | DF | AUS | Harry Politidis |
| 22 | MF | AUS | Liam Rose |
| 23 | MF | AUS | Frans Deli (scholarship) |
| 24 | FW | AUS | Dean Bosnjak |
| 25 | DF | AUS | Callum Talbot |
| 26 | MF | AUS | Luke Brattan (captain) |
| 27 | DF | AUS | Joshua Damevski (scholarship) |
| 28 | FW | AUS | Harry Sawyer |
| 29 | FW | AUS | Zane Helweh (scholarship) |
| 31 | DF | AUS | Sebastian Krslovic (scholarship) |
| 32 | DF | AUS | Will McKay (scholarship) |
| 33 | FW | KOR | Ji Dong-won |
| 35 | FW | AUS | Henrique Oliveira (scholarship) |
| 39 | FW | AUS | Michael Pratezina (scholarship) |

== Transfers ==
=== Transfers in ===
| No. | Position | Player | Transferred from | Type/fee | Contract length | Date | Ref. |
|---|---|---|---|---|---|---|---|
| 25 | DF | Callum Talbot | Melbourne City | Free transfer | Multi-year | 1 July 2025 | |
| 19 | DF | Harry Politidis | Melbourne City | Free transfer | Multi-year | 1 July 2025 | |
| 10 | MF | Anthony Caceres | Sydney FC | Free transfer | 1 year | 1 July 2025 | |
| 7 | FW | (Croatia) Šime Gržan | Unattached | Free transfer | 1 year | 16 July 2025 | |
| 33 | FW | (South Korea) Ji Dong-won | (South Korea) Suwon FC | Free transfer | 1 year | 5 August 2025 | |
| 3 | DF | (France) Damien Da Silva | (France) Clermont Foot 63 | Free transfer | 1 year | 19 August 2025 | |
| 13 | FW | (Mexico) Rafael Durán Martinez | (Mexico) Atlante | Free transfer | 1 year | 12 September 2025 | |
| 8 | FW | Luke Vickery | Unattached | Free transfer | 2 years | 26 September 2025 | |
| 15 | FW | Mitchell Duke | (Japan) Machida Zelvia | Free transfer | 6 months | 14 January 2026 | |
| 39 | FW | Michael Pratezina | (Australia) Sydney United 58 | Free transfer | 2.5 year scholarship | 29 January 2026 | |

==== From youth squad ====
| N | Pos. | Nat. | Name | Age | Notes |
|---|---|---|---|---|---|
| 29 | FW | (Australia) | Zane Helweh | 19 | 3-year scholarship contract |
| 32 | DF | (Australia) | Will McKay | 19 | 3-year scholarship contract |
| 31 | DF | (Australia) | Sebastian Krslovic | 19 | 3-year scholarship contract |

=== Transfers out ===
| No. | Position | Player | Transferred to | Type/fee | Date | Ref. |
|---|---|---|---|---|---|---|
| 33 | DF | Yianni Nicolaou | (Australia) Sutherland Sharks | End of contract | 28 June 2025 | |
| 7 | MF | Daniel De Silva | Unattached | End of contract | 30 June 2025 | |
| 8 | MF | Jake Hollman | Unattached | End of contract | 30 June 2025 | |
| 11 | MF | Peter Makrillos | Unattached | End of contract | 30 June 2025 | |
| 13 | DF | Ivan Vujica | Unattached | End of contract | 30 June 2025 | |
| 39 | DF | (Ivory Coast) Kévin Boli | Unattached | End of contract | 30 June 2025 | |
| 44 | FW | (Croatia) Marin Jakoliš | (Armenia) Noah | End of contract | 30 June 2025 | |
| 95 | MF | (Tunisia) Saîf-Eddine Khaoui | (France) Red Star | End of contract | 30 June 2025 | |
| 20 | DF | Kealey Adamson | (England) Queens Park Rangers | Undisclosed | 1 July 2025 | |

=== Contract extensions ===
| No. | Name | Position | Duration | Date | Ref. |
|---|---|---|---|---|---|
| 6 | Tomislav Uskok | DF | 1 year | 30 May 2025 | |
| 18 | Walter Scott | DF | 1 year | 2 June 2025 | |
| 14 | Kristian Popovic | MF | 1 year | 4 June 2025 | |
| 26 | Luke Brattan | MF | 1 year | 10 June 2025 | |
| 5 | Matthew Jurman | DF | 1 year | 12 August 2025 | |
| 17 | Oliver Randazzo | MF | 4 years | 12 November 2025 | |
| 24 | Dean Bosnjak | FW | 4 years | 12 November 2025 | |

== Competitions ==
=== Overall record ===
| Competition | First match | Last match | Starting round | Final position | Record | | | | | | | |
| Competition | First match | Last match | Starting round | Final position | Pld | W | D | L | GF | GA | GD | Win % |
|---|---|---|---|---|---|---|---|---|---|---|---|---|
| A-League Men | 17 October 2025 | 24 April 2026 | Matchday 1 | 7th | 26 | 9 | 7 | 10 | 37 | 44 | −7 | 34.62 |
| Australia Cup | 29 July 2025 | 24 August 2025 | Round of 32 | Quarter-final | 3 | 2 | 0 | 1 | 7 | 3 | +4 | 66.67 |
| AFC Champions League Two | 18 September 2025 | 19 February 2026 | Group stage | Round of 16 | 8 | 4 | 2 | 2 | 15 | 11 | +4 | 50.00 |
| Total | | | | | 37 | 15 | 9 | 13 | 59 | 58 | +1 | 40.54 |

Last updated: 24 April 2026
Source: Competitions

=== A-League Men ===
==== League table ====
| Pos | Team | Pld | W | D | L | GF | GA | GD | Pts | Qualification |
|---|---|---|---|---|---|---|---|---|---|---|
| 5 | Sydney FC | 26 | 11 | 6 | 9 | 33 | 25 | +8 | 39 | Qualification for the finals series (Note: The top two teams enter the finals series at the semi-finals, while the teams ranked third to sixth enter the finals series at the elimination-finals.) |
| 6 | Melbourne City | 26 | 10 | 8 | 8 | 33 | 33 | 0 | 38 | Qualification for the finals series |
| 7 | Macarthur FC | 26 | 9 | 7 | 10 | 37 | 44 | −7 | 34 | |
| 8 | Wellington Phoenix (Note: Auckland FC and Wellington Phoenix cannot qualify for Asian Football Confederation competitions as they are based in New Zealand, which is part of the Oceania Football Confederation.) | 26 | 9 | 6 | 11 | 36 | 48 | −12 | 33 | |
| 9 | Central Coast Mariners | 26 | 8 | 8 | 10 | 35 | 42 | −7 | 32 | |

Source: A-Leagues
Rules for classification: 1) points; 2) goal difference; 3) goals scored; 4) wins; 5) head-to-head results; 5a) head-to-head points; 5b) head-to-head goal difference; 6) Fair Play points; 7) away goal difference; 8) away goals per match; 9) home goal difference; 10) home goals per match; 11) toss of a coin in an event of a tie of two clubs.

==== Results summary ====
| Overall | | | | | | | | Home | | | | | | Away | | | | | |
| Pld | W | D | L | GF | GA | GD | Pts | W | D | L | GF | GA | GD | W | D | L | GF | GA | GD |
|---|---|---|---|---|---|---|---|---|---|---|---|---|---|---|---|---|---|---|---|
| 26 | 9 | 7 | 10 | 37 | 44 | −7 | 34 | 5 | 4 | 4 | 22 | 22 | 0 | 4 | 3 | 6 | 15 | 22 | −7 |

Last updated: 24 April 2026.
Source: Ultimate A-League

==== Results by round ====
| Round | 1 | 2 | 3 | 4 | 5 | 6 | 7 | 9 | 8 | 10 | 11 | 17 | 12 | 13 | 14 | 15 | 16 | 18 | 19 | 20 | 21 | 22 | 23 | 24 | 25 | 26 |
|---|---|---|---|---|---|---|---|---|---|---|---|---|---|---|---|---|---|---|---|---|---|---|---|---|---|---|
| Ground | A | H | H | A | A | H | H | H | A | A | A | H | H | A | H | A | H | A | H | H | A | A | H | A | A | H |
| Result | L | W | D | L | W | L | D | W | D | W | W | D | L | D | W | D | D | L | L | L | L | W | W | L | L | W |
| Position | 12 | 8 | 5 | 8 | 7 | 9 | 10 | 8 | 7 | 5 | 4 | 3 | 3 | 6 | 3 | 4 | 4 | 6 | 6 | 7 | 8 | 6 | 6 | 7 | 9 | 7 |
| Points | 0 | 3 | 4 | 4 | 7 | 7 | 8 | 11 | 12 | 15 | 18 | 19 | 19 | 20 | 23 | 24 | 25 | 25 | 25 | 25 | 25 | 28 | 31 | 31 | 31 | 34 |

Updated to match(es) played on 24 April 2026. Source: Ultimate A-League
A = Away; H = Home; W = Win; D = Draw; L = Loss

==== Matches ====
The fixtures for the 2025–26 A-League Men season were released on 11 September 2025.

Win Draw Loss Fixtures

| 17 October 2025 1 | Brisbane Roar | 1–0 | Macarthur FC | Brisbane |
| 20:05 AEST | O'Shea 38' (pen.) | Report | | Stadium: Suncorp Stadium; Attendance: 6,218; Referee: Adam Kersey |

| 27 October 2025 2 | Macarthur FC | 2–1 | Adelaide United | Sydney |
| 19:00 AEDT | Rose 11'; Ji 64' | Report | Yull 45+1' | Stadium: Campbelltown Sports Stadium; Attendance: 3,001; Referee: Shaun Evans |

| 1 November 2025 3 | Macarthur FC | 1–1 | Western Sydney Wanderers | Sydney |
| 19:35 AEDT | Sawyer 2' | Report | Pantazopoulos 82' | Stadium: Campbelltown Stadium; Attendance: 7,605; Referee: Alireza Faghani |

| 9 November 2025 4 | Sydney FC | 2–0 | Macarthur FC | Sydney |
| 15:00 AEDT | Tisserand 76'; Lolley 90+3' | Report | | Stadium: Leichhardt Oval; Attendance: 10,817; Referee: Daniel Elder |

| 22 November 2025 5 | Wellington Phoenix | 0–1 | Macarthur FC | Wellington |
| 17:00 NZDT | | Report | Sawyer 83' | Stadium: Sky Stadium; Attendance: 3,677; Referee: Jonathan Barreiro |

| 30 November 2025 6 | Macarthur FC | 0–2 | Perth Glory | Sydney |
| 15:00 AEDT | | Report | Pennington 66'; Shamoon 88' | Stadium: Campbelltown Sports Stadium; Attendance: 3,123; Referee: Jonathan Barreiro |

| 5 December 2025 7 | Macarthur FC | 0–0 | Melbourne Victory | Sydney |
| 19:35 AEDT | | Report | | Stadium: Campbelltown Sports Stadium; Attendance: 3,046; Referee: Alex King |

| 19 December 2025 9 | Macarthur FC | 2–1 | Brisbane Roar | Sydney |
| 19:05 AEDT | Sawyer 66' (pen.), 73' (pen.) | Report | Dench 48' | Stadium: Campbelltown Sports Stadium; Attendance: 2,734; Referee: Adam Kersey |
Note: The match was originally scheduled for 18:00, but was delayed to 19:05 due to adverse weather conditions.

| 23 December 2025 8 | Melbourne City | 1–1 | Macarthur FC | Melbourne |
| 19:15 AEDT | Behich 25' | Report | Durán 36' | Stadium: AAMI Park; Attendance: 4,304; Referee: Jonathan Barreiro |

| 26 December 2025 10 | Newcastle Jets | 4–5 | Macarthur FC | Newcastle |
| 19:35 AEDT | Adams 42'; Taylor 48'; Bertoncello 75'; Gibson 83' | Report | Bernardo 15'; Bosnjak 45+1', 50'; Sawyer 68'; Vickery 90+6' | Stadium: McDonald Jones Stadium; Attendance: 5,307; Referee: Sam Kelly |

| 1 January 2026 11 | Western Sydney Wanderers | 0–1 | Macarthur FC | Sydney |
| 19:00 AEDT | | Report | Durán 41' | Stadium: CommBank Stadium; Attendance: 8,048; Referee: Jonathan Barreiro |

| 5 January 2026 17 | Macarthur FC | 1–1 | Auckland FC | Sydney |
| 16:00 AEDT | Uskok 70' | Report | Brook 41' | Stadium: Campbelltown Sports Stadium; Attendance: 3,543; Referee: Adam Kersey |

| 10 January 2026 12 | Macarthur FC | 0–3 | Sydney FC | Sydney |
| 19:35 AEDT | | Report | Quispe 31'; Campuzano 48'; Wood 62' | Stadium: Campbelltown Sports Stadium; Attendance: 6,023; Referee: Shaun Evans |

| 18 January 2026 13 | Central Coast Mariners | 1–1 | Macarthur FC | Gosford |
| 14:00 AEDT | Ngor 77' | Report | Vickery 67' | Stadium: Polytec Stadium; Attendance: 1,601; Referee: Ben Abraham |
Note: Match was postponed due to torrential rain.

| 24 January 2026 14 | Macarthur FC | 6–2 | Melbourne City | Leumeah |
| 19:35 AEDT | Duke 6'; Brattan 9'; Caceres 34'; Vickery 62'; Bosnjak 70'; Sawyer 90+3' | Report | Memeti 24'; Younis 84' | Stadium: Campbelltown Sports Stadium; Attendance: 3,654; Referee: Lachlan Keevers |

| 30 January 2026 15 | Adelaide United | 1–1 | Macarthur FC | Adelaide |
| 19:35 ACDT | Yull 37' | Report | Ikonomidis 37' | Stadium: Coopers Stadium; Attendance: 7,343; Referee: Nathan Shakespear |
Note: Due to forecasted heat, the match's kickoff time was postponed by 30 minutes.

| 6 February 2026 16 | Macarthur FC | 2–2 | Perth Glory | Sydney |
| 16:35 AEDT | Pennington 36'; Colakovski 90' | Report | Duke 60'; Talbot 71' | Stadium: Campbelltown Sports Stadium; Attendance: 3,906; Referee: Alireza Faghani |

| 22 February 2026 18 | Newcastle Jets | 1–0 | Macarthur FC | Newcastle |
| 18:00 AEDT | Bayliss 54' | Report | | Stadium: McDonald Jones Stadium; Attendance: 14,035; Referee: Ben Abraham |

| 28 February 2026 19 | Macarthur FC | 0–4 | Western Sydney Wanderers | Sydney |
| 19:35 AEDT | | Report | Ugarkovic 6'; Kraev 24'; Fraser 43'; Borrello 70' | Stadium: Campbelltown Stadium; Attendance: 5,321; Referee: Daniel Elder |

| 5 March 2026 20 | Macarthur FC | 1–3 | Central Coast Mariners | Sydney |
| 19:25 AEDT | Caceres 67' | Report | McCalmont 37' (pen.); Brandtman 65'; Blair 84' | Stadium: Campbelltown Stadium; Attendance: 2,915; Referee: Sam Kelly |

| 15 March 2026 21 | Melbourne Victory | 4–1 | Macarthur FC | Melbourne |
| 19:00 AEDT | Da Silva 11' (o.g.); Genreau 25'; Esposito 63'; Nduka 66' | Report | Vickery 37' | Stadium: AAMI Park; Attendance: 6,012; Referee: Shaun Evans |

| 21 March 2026 22 | Auckland FC | 1–2 | Macarthur FC | Auckland |
| 15:00 NZDT | Girdwood-Reich 90+3' | Report | Durán 11'; Uskok 44' | Stadium: Go Media Stadium; Attendance: 11,689; Referee: Daniel Elder |

| 2 April 2026 23 | Macarthur FC | 3–2 | Newcastle Jets | Sydney |
| 19:35 AEDT | Duke 10', 68'; Durán 23' | Report | Bertoncello 13', 45+5' | Stadium: Campbelltown Sports Stadium; Attendance: 3,621; Referee: Shane Skinner |

| 12 April 2026 24 | Perth Glory | 3–1 | Macarthur FC | Perth |
| 17:00 AWST | Pennington 48'; Popovic 76'; Sulemani 90+5' | Report | Vickery 68' | Stadium: HBF Park; Attendance: 5,893; Referee: Shane Skinner |

| 19 April 2026 25 | Adelaide United | 3–1 | Macarthur FC | Adelaide |
| 15:00 ACST | Anselmo 63', 89'; Kikianis 75' | Report | Duke 7' | Stadium: Coopers Stadium; Attendance: 12,141; Referee: Adam Kersey |

| 24 April 2026 26 | Macarthur FC | 4–0 | Wellington Phoenix | Sydney |
| 19:35 AEST | Jurman 6'; Bosnjak 22'; Brattan 34'; Bernardo 80' | Report | | Stadium: Campbelltown Sports Stadium; Attendance: 6,013; Referee: Lachlan Keevers |

=== Australia Cup ===
| 29 July 2025 Round of 32 | SD Raiders | 0–5 | Macarthur FC | Sydney |
| 19:30 AEST | | Report | Bernardo 32'; Letta 36' (o.g.); Sawyer 49'; Ikonomidis 64'; Caceres 82' | Stadium: Fairfield Showground; Attendance: 2,716; Referee: Jake Rose |

| 11 August 2025 Round of 16 | North Eastern MetroStars | 0–2 | Macarthur FC | Adelaide |
| 19:30 ACST | | Report | Bernardo 34'; Ikonomidis 47' | Stadium: T.K. Shutter Reserve; Attendance: 2,073; Referee: Daniel Cook |

| 24 August 2025 Quarter-final | Newcastle Jets | 3–0 | Macarthur FC | Maitland |
| 16:00 AEST | Burgess 18'; Dobson 73'; Mizunuma 77' | Report | | Stadium: Maitland Showground; Attendance: 2,579; Referee: Tim Danaskos |

=== AFC Champions League Two ===
==== Group stage ====
| Pos | Team | Pld | W | D | L | GF | GA | GD | Pts | Qualification | MAC | HNP | TPF | BJG |
|---|---|---|---|---|---|---|---|---|---|---|---|---|---|---|
| 1 | (Australia) Macarthur FC | 6 | 4 | 1 | 1 | 11 | 6 | +5 | 13 | Advance to round of 16 | — | 2–1 | 2–1 | 3–0 |
| 2 | (Vietnam) Công An Hà Nội | 6 | 2 | 2 | 2 | 9 | 7 | +2 | 8 | Advance to round of 16 | 1–1 | — | 3–0 | 2–1 |
| 3 | (Hong Kong) Tai Po | 6 | 2 | 1 | 3 | 7 | 12 | −5 | 7 | | 2–1 | 1–0 | — | 3–3 |
| 4 | (China) Beijing Guoan | 6 | 1 | 2 | 3 | 10 | 12 | −2 | 5 | | 1–2 | 2–2 | 3–0 | — |

Source: ACL2
Rules for classification: Tiebreakers

| 18 September 2025 1 | Tai Po (Hong Kong) | 2–1 | (Australia) Macarthur FC | Mong Kok, Hong Kong |
| 18:00 UTC+8 | Cividini 3'; Renner 66' | Report | Temelkovski 70' (o.g.) | Stadium: Mong Kok Stadium; Attendance: 1,875; Referee: Ahmad Alaeddin (Lebanon) |

| 2 October 2025 2 | Macarthur FC (Australia) | 3–0 | (China) Beijing Guoan | Sydney, Australia |
| 17:45 AEST | Ikonomidis 4'; Uskok 59'; Gržan 89' | Report | | Stadium: Campbelltown Sports Stadium; Attendance: 2,960; Referee: Mohammed Al-Shammari (Qatar) |

| 23 October 2025 3 | Công An Hà Nội (Vietnam) | 1–1 | (Australia) Macarthur FC | Hanoi, Vietnam |
| 19:15 UTC+7 | Lê Văn Đô 30' | Report | Uskok 77' | Stadium: Hàng Đẫy Stadium; Attendance: 4,169; Referee: Hanna Hattab (Syria) |

| 6 November 2025 4 | Macarthur FC (Australia) | 2–1 | (Vietnam) Công An Hà Nội | Sydney, Australia |
| 18:45 AEDT | Gržan 20'; Cáceres 75' | Report | Adou 30' | Stadium: Campbelltown Sports Stadium; Attendance: 2,889; Referee: Clifford Postanes Daypuyat (Philippines) |

| 27 November 2025 5 | Macarthur FC (Australia) | 2–1 | (Hong Kong) Tai Po | Sydney, Australia |
| 18:45 AEDT | Vickery 50', 70' | Report | Sartori 24' | Stadium: Campbelltown Sports Stadium; Attendance: 1,544; Referee: Oh Hyeon-jeong (South Korea) |

| 11 December 2025 6 | Beijing Guoan (China) | 1–2 | (Australia) Macarthur FC | Beijing, China |
| 20:15 UTC+8 | Serginho 59' | Report | Popovic 56'; Sawyer 71' (pen.) | Stadium: Workers' Stadium; Attendance: 20,759; Referee: Ahmad Alaeddin (Lebanon) |

==== Knockout stage ====
| 12 February 2026 Round of 16 | Bangkok United (Thailand) | 2–0 | (Australia) Macarthur FC | Pathum Thani, Thailand |
| 19:15 UTC+7 | Alhaft 37'; Arthur 72' | Report | | Stadium: Pathum Thani Stadium; Attendance: 1,092; Referee: Shen Yinhao (China) |

| 19 February 2026 Round of 16 | Macarthur FC (Australia) | 2–2 | (Thailand) Bangkok United | Sydney, Australia |
| 18:45 UTC+11 | Scott 41'; Sawyer 90+2' | Report | Al-Ghassani 2', 33' | Stadium: Campbelltown Sports Stadium; Attendance: 1,666; Referee: Meder Tayçiev (Kyrgyzstan) |

== Statistics ==
=== Appearances and goals ===
As of match played 24 April 2026

Includes all competitions. Players with no appearances not included in the list.

| No. | Pos | Nat | Player | Total | | A-League Men | | Australia Cup | | AFC Champions League Two | |
| No. | Pos | Nat | Player | Apps | Goals | Apps | Goals | Apps | Goals | Apps | Goals |
|---|---|---|---|---|---|---|---|---|---|---|---|
| 1 | GK | (Australia) AUS | Alexander Robinson | 9 | 0 | 8 | 0 | 0 | 0 | 1 | 0 |
| 3 | DF | (France) FRA | Damien Da Silva | 26 | 0 | 20+1 | 0 | 0 | 0 | 5 | 0 |
| 5 | DF | (Australia) AUS | Matthew Jurman | 15 | 1 | 7+3 | 1 | 0+1 | 0 | 2+2 | 0 |
| 6 | DF | (Australia) AUS | Tomislav Uskok | 34 | 4 | 21+2 | 2 | 3+0 | 0 | 8 | 2 |
| 7 | FW | (Croatia) CRO | Šime Gržan | 24 | 2 | 15+2 | 0 | 0+1 | 0 | 5+1 | 2 |
| 8 | FW | (Australia) AUS | Luke Vickery | 30 | 7 | 15+9 | 5 | 0 | 0 | 3+3 | 2 |
| 9 | FW | (Australia) AUS | Chris Ikonomidis | 22 | 4 | 5+9 | 1 | 3 | 2 | 5 | 1 |
| 10 | MF | (Australia) AUS | Anthony Caceres | 34 | 4 | 22+1 | 2 | 3 | 1 | 8 | 1 |
| 11 | FW | (Australia) AUS | Bernardo | 18 | 4 | 5+9 | 2 | 2+0 | 2 | 1+1 | 0 |
| 12 | GK | (Poland) POL | Filip Kurto | 29 | 0 | 18+1 | 0 | 3 | 0 | 7 | 0 |
| 13 | FW | (Mexico) MEX | Rafael Durán | 24 | 4 | 14+5 | 4 | 0 | 0 | 2+3 | 0 |
| 14 | MF | (Australia) AUS | Kristian Popovic | 7 | 1 | 3+3 | 0 | 0 | 0 | 1 | 1 |
| 15 | FW | (Australia) AUS | Mitch Duke | 15 | 5 | 11+2 | 5 | 0 | 0 | 2 | 0 |
| 17 | MF | (Australia) AUS | Oliver Randazzo | 22 | 0 | 4+9 | 0 | 0+2 | 0 | 5+2 | 0 |
| 18 | DF | (Australia) AUS | Walter Scott | 25 | 1 | 11+7 | 0 | 1+2 | 0 | 3+1 | 1 |
| 19 | DF | (Australia) AUS | Harry Politidis | 19 | 0 | 9+2 | 0 | 3 | 0 | 5 | 0 |
| 22 | MF | (Australia) AUS | Liam Rose | 35 | 1 | 21+3 | 1 | 3 | 0 | 4+4 | 0 |
| 23 | MF | (Australia) AUS | Frans Deli | 9 | 0 | 1+6 | 0 | 0+1 | 0 | 0+1 | 0 |
| 24 | FW | (Australia) AUS | Dean Bosnjak | 31 | 4 | 14+9 | 4 | 0+1 | 0 | 2+5 | 0 |
| 25 | DF | (Australia) AUS | Callum Talbot | 35 | 1 | 25 | 1 | 3 | 0 | 6+1 | 0 |
| 26 | MF | (Australia) AUS | Luke Brattan | 32 | 1 | 22+1 | 1 | 3 | 0 | 6 | 0 |
| 27 | MF | (Australia) AUS | Joshua Damevski | 1 | 0 | 0 | 0 | 0 | 0 | 0+1 | 0 |
| 28 | FW | (Australia) AUS | Harry Sawyer | 36 | 9 | 8+18 | 6 | 3 | 1 | 1+6 | 2 |
| 29 | FW | (Australia) AUS | Zane Helweh | 13 | 0 | 0+6 | 0 | 0+3 | 0 | 0+4 | 0 |
| 31 | DF | (Australia) AUS | Sebastian Krslovic | 3 | 0 | 0 | 0 | 3+0 | 0 | 0 | 0 |
| 32 | DF | (Australia) AUS | Will McKay | 14 | 0 | 4+7 | 0 | 0+1 | 0 | 2 | 0 |
| 33 | FW | (South Korea) KOR | Ji Dong-won | 14 | 1 | 3+6 | 1 | 0+1 | 0 | 3+1 | 0 |
| 35 | FW | (Australia) AUS | Henrique Oliveira | 4 | 0 | 0+4 | 0 | 0 | 0 | 0 | 0 |

=== Disciplinary record ===
Includes all competitions. The list is sorted by squad number when total cards are equal. Players with no cards not included in the list.

As of match played 19 April 2026

| Rank | No. | Pos. | Nat. | Name | A-League Men | | | Australia Cup | | | AFC Champions League Two | | | Total | | |
| Rank | No. | Pos. | Nat. | Name | Yellow card | (yellow card) (yellow-red card) | Red card | Yellow card | (yellow card) (yellow-red card) | Red card | Yellow card | (yellow card) (yellow-red card) | Red card | Yellow card | (yellow card) (yellow-red card) | Red card |
|---|---|---|---|---|---|---|---|---|---|---|---|---|---|---|---|---|
| 1 | 6 | DF | (Australia) | Tomislav Uskok | 6 | 0 | 1 | 0 | 0 | 0 | 2 | 0 | 0 | 8 | 0 | 1 |
| 2 | 25 | DF | (Australia) | Callum Talbot | 4 | 0 | 0 | 0 | 0 | 0 | 1 | 0 | 1 | 5 | 0 | 1 |
| 3 | 1 | GK | (Australia) | Alexander Robinson | 0 | 0 | 1 | 0 | 0 | 0 | 1 | 0 | 0 | 1 | 0 | 1 |
| 4 | 26 | MF | (Australia) | Luke Brattan | 8 | 0 | 0 | 1 | 0 | 0 | 1 | 0 | 0 | 10 | 0 | 0 |
| 5 | 22 | MF | (Australia) | Liam Rose | 5 | 0 | 0 | 0 | 0 | 0 | 1 | 0 | 0 | 6 | 0 | 0 |
| 6 | 10 | MF | (Australia) | Anthony Caceres | 4 | 0 | 0 | 0 | 0 | 0 | 1 | 0 | 0 | 5 | 0 | 0 |
| 6 | 18 | DF | (Australia) | Walter Scott | 4 | 0 | 0 | 0 | 0 | 0 | 1 | 0 | 0 | 5 | 0 | 0 |
| 8 | 24 | FW | (Australia) | Dean Bosnjak | 4 | 0 | 0 | 0 | 0 | 0 | 0 | 0 | 0 | 4 | 0 | 0 |
| 8 | 28 | FW | (Australia) | Harry Sawyer | 2 | 0 | 0 | 1 | 0 | 0 | 1 | 0 | 0 | 4 | 0 | 0 |
| 8 | 33 | FW | (South Korea) | Ji Dong-won | 4 | 0 | 0 | 0 | 0 | 0 | 0 | 0 | 0 | 4 | 0 | 0 |
| 11 | 15 | FW | (Australia) | Mitch Duke | 3 | 0 | 0 | 0 | 0 | 0 | 0 | 0 | 0 | 3 | 0 | 0 |
| 12 | 8 | FW | (Australia) | Luke Vickery | 2 | 0 | 0 | 0 | 0 | 0 | 0 | 0 | 0 | 2 | 0 | 0 |
| 12 | 11 | FW | (Australia) | Bernardo | 2 | 0 | 0 | 0 | 0 | 0 | 0 | 0 | 0 | 2 | 0 | 0 |
| 12 | 19 | DF | (Australia) | Harry Politidis | 1 | 0 | 0 | 0 | 0 | 0 | 1 | 0 | 0 | 2 | 0 | 0 |
| 12 | 23 | MF | (Australia) | Frans Deli | 2 | 0 | 0 | 0 | 0 | 0 | 0 | 0 | 0 | 2 | 0 | 0 |
| 16 | 5 | DF | (Australia) | Matthew Jurman | 1 | 0 | 0 | 0 | 0 | 0 | 0 | 0 | 0 | 1 | 0 | 0 |
| 16 | 7 | FW | (Croatia) | Šime Gržan | 1 | 0 | 0 | 0 | 0 | 0 | 0 | 0 | 0 | 1 | 0 | 0 |
| 16 | 9 | FW | (Australia) | Chris Ikonomidis | 1 | 0 | 0 | 0 | 0 | 0 | 0 | 0 | 0 | 1 | 0 | 0 |
| 16 | 12 | GK | (Poland) | Filip Kurto | 1 | 0 | 0 | 0 | 0 | 0 | 0 | 0 | 0 | 1 | 0 | 0 |
| 16 | 14 | MF | (Australia) | Kristian Popovic | 0 | 0 | 0 | 0 | 0 | 0 | 1 | 0 | 0 | 1 | 0 | 0 |
| 16 | 31 | DF | (Australia) | Sebastian Kršlović | 0 | 0 | 0 | 1 | 0 | 0 | 0 | 0 | 0 | 1 | 0 | 0 |
| Total | | | | | 55 | 0 | 2 | 3 | 0 | 0 | 11 | 0 | 1 | 69 | 0 | 3 |

=== Clean sheets ===
Includes all competitions. The list is sorted by squad number when total clean sheets are equal. Numbers in parentheses represent games where both goalkeepers participated and both kept a clean sheet; the number in parentheses is awarded to the goalkeeper who was substituted on, whilst a full clean sheet is awarded to the goalkeeper who was on the field at the start of play. Goalkeepers with no clean sheets not included in the list.

As of match played 24 April 2026

| Rank | No. | Nat. | Goalkeeper | A-League Men | Australia Cup | AFC Champions League Two | Total |
|---|---|---|---|---|---|---|---|
| 1 | 12 | (Poland) | Filip Kurto | 3 | 1 | 1 | 5 |
| 2 | 1 | (Australia) | Alexander Robinson | 1 | 0 | 0 | 1 |
| Total | | | | 4 | 1 | 1 | 6 |
