= 2026–27 Macarthur FC season =

Macarthur FC
2026–27 season
- Manager: Sasa Ognenovski
- Stadium: Campbelltown Sports Stadium
- A-League Men: 5th
- Australia Cup: Round of 16
- Top goalscorer: League: Apostolos Stamatelopoulos (2 goals); All: Apostolos Stamatelopoulos (2 goals)
- Highest home attendance: 6,232 vs. Western Sydney Wanderers (31 October 2026); A-League Men
- Lowest home attendance: 3,441 vs. Perth Glory (17 October 2026); A-League Men
- Average home league attendance: 4,414
- Biggest win: 3–0 vs. Azzurri United (A) (22 July 2026); Australia Cup
- Biggest defeat: 1–2 vs. Brisbane Roar (H) (8 November 2026); A-League Men
Home colours	Away colours
- All statistics correct as of 22 November 2026.

The 2026–27 season is Macarthur Football Club's seventh season in the A-League Men. In addition to the domestic league, Macarthur FC also participated in the 2026 Australia Cup.

== Players ==
Note: Flags indicate national team as defined under FIFA eligibility rules; some limited exceptions apply. Players may hold more than one non-FIFA nationality.

No.	Pos.	Nation	Player
1	GK	AUS	Alexander Robinson
3	DF	JPN	Tatsuki Nara (on loan from Avispa Fukuoka)
5	DF	AUS	Jonathan Aspropotamitis
6	FW	SCO	Kai Kennedy
7	MF	AUS	Connor Pain
8	FW	IDN	Luke Vickery
9	FW	AUS	Ben Gibson
10	FW	SCO	Ryan Fraser
11	FW	AUS	Bernardo Oliveira
13	GK	AUS	James Hilton
14	FW	AUS	Michael Pratezina (scholarship)
16	FW	AUS	Apostolos Stamatelopoulos
17	MF	AUS	Oliver Randazzo
18	MF	AUS	Dylan Rose

No.	Pos.	Nation	Player
19	DF	AUS	Harry Politidis
20	FW	AUS	Henrique Oliveira (scholarship)
21	DF	AUS	Nathan Paull
22	MF	AUS	Liam Rose (captain)
23	MF	AUS	Kosta Grozos
24	FW	AUS	Dean Bosnjak
25	DF	AUS	Callum Talbot (vice-captain)
27	FW	AUS	Jing Reec
29	FW	AUS	Zane Helweh (scholarship)
31	DF	AUS	Sebastian Krslovic (scholarship)
32	DF	AUS	Will McKay (scholarship)
33	DF	AUS	Harry Menham (scholarship)
99	FW	AUS	Musa Touré

== Transfers ==
=== Transfers in ===
No.	Position	Player	Transferred from	Type/fee	Contract length	Date	Ref.
21	DF	Nathan Paull	Central Coast Mariners	Free transfer	1 year	1 July 2026	
9	FW	Ben Gibson	Newcastle Jets	Free transfer	1 year	1 July 2026	
27	FW	Jing Reec	Melbourne Victory	Free transfer	1 year	1 July 2026	
5	DF	Jonathan Aspropotamitis	Unattached	Free transfer	1 year	1 July 2026	
13	GK	James Hilton	Auckland FC	Free transfer	1 year	1 July 2026	
23	MF	Kosta Grozos	Newcastle Jets	Free transfer	1 year	1 July 2026	
7	FW	Connor Pain	Unattached	Free transfer		7 July 2026	
6	FW	(Scotland) Kai Kennedy	Unattached	Free transfer	1 year	3 August 2026	
10	FW	(Scotland) Ryan Fraser	Unattached	Free transfer		31 August 2026	
3	DF	(Japan) Tatsuki Nara	(Japan) Avispa Fukuoka	Loan	1 year	3 September 2026	
99	FW	Musa Toure	(Denmark) Randers FC	Free transfer		7 September 2026	
16	FW	Apostolos Stamatelopoulos	(Scotland) Motherwell	Free transfer		14 September 2026	
18	MF	Dylan Rose	(Australia) Sydney United 58	Free transfer		15 September 2026	

==== From youth squad ====
N	Pos.	Nat.	Name	Age	Notes
33	DF	(Australia)	Harry Menham	19	Scholarship contract

=== Transfers out ===
No.	Position	Player	Transferred to	Type/fee	Date	Ref.
3	DF	(France) Damien Da Silva	Retired		24 April 2026	
6	DF	Tomislav Uskok	(Australia) Bankstown City	End of contract	26 June 2026	
5	DF	Matthew Jurman	(Australia) Sutherland Sharks	End of contract	30 June 2026	
7	FW	(Croatia) Šime Gržan	Unattached	End of contract	30 June 2026	
9	FW	Chris Ikonomidis	Unattached	End of contract	30 June 2026	
10	MF	Anthony Caceres	Unattached	End of contract	30 June 2026	
12	GK	(Poland) Filip Kurto	(Australia) Sydney Olympic	End of contract	30 June 2026	
13	FW	(Mexico) Rafael Durán	Unattached	End of contract	30 June 2026	
14	MF	Kristian Popovic	Unattached	End of contract	30 June 2026	
15	FW	Mitchell Duke	(Japan) Machida Zelvia	End of contract	30 June 2026	
18	DF	Walter Scott	Unattached	End of contract	30 June 2026	
23	MF	Frans Deli	(Australia) APIA Leichhardt	End of contract	30 June 2026	
26	MF	Luke Brattan	Unattached	End of contract	30 June 2026	
27	DF	Joshua Damevski	Unattached	End of contract	30 June 2026	
28	FW	Harry Sawyer	Unattached	End of contract	30 June 2026	
33	FW	(South Korea) Ji Dong-won	Unattached	End of contract	30 June 2026	

=== Contract extensions ===
No.	Name	Position	Duration	Date	Ref.
22	Liam Rose	Central midfielder	2 years	1 June 2026	
1	Alexander Robinson	Goalkeeper	3 years	2 June 2026	
11	Bernardo Oliveira	Winger	3 years	4 June 2026	
8	Luke Vickery	Winger	1 year	5 June 2026	Contract extended from end of 2026–27 until end of 2027–28.

== Pre-season and friendlies ==
3 August 2026	Newcastle Jets (Australia)	0–2	(Australia) Macarthur FC	Maitland, Australia
		Report	Gibson; Reec	Stadium: Cooks Square Park

22 August 2026	Western Sydney Wanderers (Australia)	1–0	(Australia) Macarthur FC	Sydney, Australia
11:00 AEST		Report		Stadium: Wanderers Football Park

September 2026	Macarthur FC (Australia)	3–2	(New Zealand) Auckland FC	Sydney, Australia
		Report		Attendance: 0 (behind closed doors)

10 October 2026	Macarthur FC (Australia)	2–0	(New Zealand) Wellington Phoenix	Sydney, Australia
		Report

== Competitions ==
=== Overall record ===
Competition	First match	Last match	Starting round	Final position	Record							
Competition	First match	Last match	Starting round	Final position	Pld	W	D	L	GF	GA	GD	Win %
A-League Men	17 October 2026		Matchday 1		5	2	2	1	6	5	+1	40.00
Australia Cup	22 July 2026	11 August 2026	Round of 32	Round of 16	2	1	1	0	4	1	+3	50.00
Total					7	3	3	1	10	6	+4	42.86

Last updated: 22 November 2026
Source: Competitions

=== A-League Men ===
==== League table ====
Pos	Team	Pld	W	D	L	GF	GA	GD	Pts	Qualification
3	Sydney FC	5	2	2	1	7	4	+3	8	Qualification for the AFC Champions League Elite preliminary stage and the finals series (Note: The top two teams enter the finals series at the semi-finals, while the teams ranked third to sixth enter the finals series at the elimination-finals.)
4	Brisbane Roar	4	2	2	0	5	3	+2	8	Qualification for the finals series
5	Macarthur FC	5	2	2	1	6	5	+1	8	Qualification for the finals series
6	Perth Glory	5	2	1	2	8	5	+3	7	Qualification for the finals series
7	Melbourne City	4	2	1	1	6	6	0	7	

Updated to match(es) played on 22 November 2026. Source: A-Leagues
Rules for classification: 1) points; 2) goal difference; 3) goals scored; 4) wins; 5) head-to-head results; 5a) head-to-head points; 5b) head-to-head goal difference; 6) Fair Play points; 7) away goal difference; 8) away goals per match; 9) home goal difference; 10) home goals per match; 11) toss of a coin in an event of a tie of two clubs.

==== Results summary ====
Overall								Home						Away					
Pld	W	D	L	GF	GA	GD	Pts	W	D	L	GF	GA	GD	W	D	L	GF	GA	GD
5	2	2	1	6	5	+1	8	1	1	1	3	3	0	1	1	0	3	2	+1

Last updated: 22 November 2026.
Source: Ultimate A-League

==== Results by round ====
Round	1	2	3	4	5	6	7	8	9	10	11	12	13	14	15	16	17	18	19	20	21	22	23	24	25	26	27	28
Ground	H	A	H	H	A	H	B	A	H	A	A	A	H	H	A	H	B	A	A	H	H	A	A	A	H	H	H	A
Result	W	D	D	L	W		X										X											
Position	3	3	3	7	5																							
Points	3	4	5	5	8																							

Updated to match(es) played on 22 November 2026. Source: Ultimate A-League
A = Away; H = Home; W = Win; D = Draw; L = Loss; X = Bye

==== Matches ====
Win Draw Loss Fixtures

17 October2026 1	Macarthur FC	2–1	Perth Glory	Sydney
19:40 AEDT	Fraser 86' (pen.); Aspropotamitis 89'	Report	Lawrence 59'	Stadium: Campbelltown Sports Stadium; Attendance: 3,441; Referee: Shaun Evans

24 October 2026 2	Newcastle Jets	1–1	Macarthur FC	Newcastle
15:00 AEDT	Bertoncello 5'	Report	Toure 70'	Stadium: McDonald Jones Stadium; Attendance: 7,293; Referee: Alex King

31 October 2026 3	Macarthur FC	0–0	Western Sydney Wanderers	Sydney
19:40 AEDT		Report		Stadium: Campbelltown Sports Stadium; Attendance: 6,232; Referee: Daniel Elder

8 November 2026 4	Macarthur FC	1–2	Brisbane Roar	Sydney
15:00 AEDT	Stamatelopoulos 64'	Report	Ngor 48'; Vidic 90+5'	Stadium: Campbelltown Sports Stadium; Attendance: 3,568; Referee: Adam Kersey

22 November 2026 5	Wellington Phoenix	1–2	Macarthur FC	Wellington
17:00 NZDT	Bidois 88'	Report	Stamatelopoulos 6'; Bosnjak 19'	Stadium: Hnry Stadium; Referee: Alireza Faghani

27 November 2026 6	Macarthur FC	v	Melbourne City	Leumeah
19:40 AEDT		Report		Stadium: Campbelltown Sports Stadium

11 December 2026 8	Adelaide United	v	Macarthur FC	Adelaide
19:10 ACDT		Source		Stadium: Coopers Stadium

21 December 2026 9	Macarthur FC	v	Central Coast Mariners	Sydney
19:00 AEDT		Report		Stadium: Campbelltown Sports Stadium

28 December 2026 10	Sydney FC	v	Macarthur FC	Sydney
19:00 AEDT		Report		Stadium: Allianz Stadium

1 January 2027 11	Western Sydney Wanderers	v	Macarthur FC	Sydney
19:00 AEDT		Source		Stadium: CommBank Stadium

8 January 2027 12	Perth Glory	v	Macarthur FC	Perth
18:45 AWST		Report		Stadium: HBF Park

14 January 2027 13	Macarthur FC	v	Wellington Phoenix	Sydney
19:40 AEDT				Stadium: Campbelltown Sports Stadium

25 January 2027 14	Macarthur FC	v	Adelaide United	Sydney
19:00 AEDT		Source		Stadium: Campbelltown Sports Stadium

31 January 2027 15	Central Coast Mariners	v	Macarthur FC	Gosford
15:00 AEDT		Source		Stadium: Polytec Stadium

6 February 2027 16	Macarthur FC	v	Auckland FC	Sydney
16:00 AEDT		Report		Stadium: Campbelltown Sports Stadium

19 February 2027 18	Brisbane Roar	v	Macarthur FC	Brisbane
17:00 AEST		Report		Stadium: Suncorp Stadium

27 February 2027 19	Melbourne Victory	v	Macarthur FC	Melbourne
19:40 AEST				Stadium: AAMI Park

6 March 2027 20	Macarthur FC	v	Newcastle Jets	Sydney
17:00 AEDT		Report		Stadium: Campbelltown Sports Stadium

13 March 2027 21	Macarthur FC	v	Sydney FC	Sydney
19:40 AEDT		Report		Stadium: Campbelltown Sports Stadium

20 March 2027 22	Wellington Phoenix	v	Macarthur FC	Wellington
17:00 NZDT				Stadium: Wellington Stadium

4 April 2027 23	Auckland FC	v	Macarthur FC	Auckland
15:00 NZST		Report		Stadium: Go Media Stadium

9 April 2027 24	Melbourne City	v	Macarthur FC	Melbourne
19:40 AEDT		Report		Stadium: AAMI Park

18 April 2027 25	Macarthur FC	v	Western Sydney Wanderers	Sydney
15:00 AEST		Source		Stadium: Campbelltown Sports Stadium

26 April 2027 26	Macarthur FC	v	Melbourne Victory	Sydney
19:00 AEST		Report		Stadium: Campbelltown Stadium

1 May 2027 27	Macarthur FC	v	Sydney FC	Sydney
19:40 AEST		Report		Stadium: Campbelltown Stadium

8 May 2027 28	Central Coast Mariners	v	Macarthur FC	Gosford
19:40 AEST		Source		Stadium: Polytec Stadium

=== Australia Cup ===
22 July 2026 Round of 32	Azzurri United	0–3	Macarthur FC	Darwin
19:30 ACST		Report	Pratezina 5'; Gibson 61'; Pain 80'	Stadium: Darwin Football Stadium; Referee: Jack Powers

11 August 2026 Round of 16	SD Raiders	1–1 (a.e.t.) (5–3 p)	Macarthur FC	Sydney
19:30 AEST	Politidis 115' (o.g.)	Report	Helweh 103'	Stadium: Fairfield Showground; Attendance: 1,946; Referee: Noah Moss
	Penalties
	Eremugo (penalty scored); Malfara (penalty scored); Ragg (penalty scored); Lee (penalty scored); Malbasa (penalty scored)		(penalty scored) Reec; (penalty scored) El-Sabeh; (penalty missed) Vickery; (penalty scored) Helweh

== Statistics ==
=== Appearances and goals ===
As of 22 November 2026

Includes all competitions. Players with no appearances not included in the list.

No.	Pos	Nat	Player	Total		A-League Men		Australia Cup	
No.	Pos	Nat	Player	Apps	Goals	Apps	Goals	Apps	Goals
1	GK	(Australia) AUS	Alexander Robinson	7	0	5	0	2	0
3	DF	(Japan) JPN	Tatsuki Nara	5	0	5	0	0	0
5	DF	(Australia) AUS	Jonathan Aspropotamitis	5	1	4	1	1	0
6	FW	(Scotland) SCO	Kai Kennedy	2	0	1+1	0	0	0
7	FW	(Australia) AUS	Connor Pain	7	1	5	0	1+1	1
8	FW	(Indonesia) IDN	Luke Vickery	5	0	3+1	0	0+1	0
9	FW	(Australia) AUS	Ben Gibson	7	1	2+3	0	2	1
10	FW	(Scotland) SCO	Ryan Fraser	5	1	1+4	1	0	0
11	FW	(Australia) AUS	Bernardo Oliveira	2	0	1+1	0	0	0
14	MF	(Australia) AUS	Michael Pratezina	2	1	0	0	2	1
16	FW	(Australia) AUS	Apostolos Stamatelopoulos	5	2	5	2	0	0
17	MF	(Australia) AUS	Oliver Randazzo	5	0	2+1	0	2	0
18	MF	(Australia) AUS	Dylan Rose	4	0	3+1	0	0	0
19	DF	(Australia) AUS	Harry Politidis	3	0	0+1	0	1+1	0
20	FW	(Australia) AUS	Henrique Oliveira	2	0	0	0	2	0
21	DF	(Australia) AUS	Nathan Paull	5	0	4	0	1	0
22	MF	(Australia) AUS	Liam Rose	5	0	4	0	1	0
23	MF	(Australia) AUS	Kosta Grozos	2	0	0+1	0	0+1	0
24	FW	(Australia) AUS	Dean Bosnjak	5	1	4+1	1	0	0
25	DF	(Australia) AUS	Callum Talbot	7	0	5	0	2	0
27	FW	(Australia) AUS	Jing Reec	4	0	0+2	0	0+2	0
29	FW	(Australia) AUS	Zane Helweh	4	1	0+2	0	0+2	1
31	DF	(Australia) AUS	Sebastian Krslovic	2	0	0	0	2	0
33	DF	(Australia) AUS	Harry Menham	2	0	0	0	1+1	0
34	DF	(Australia) AUS	Sonny Sterjovski	1	0	0	0	0+1	0
99	FW	(Australia) AUS	Musa Toure	5	1	1+4	1	0	0
Players who featured but departed the club during the season:
35	MF	(Australia) AUS	Ali El-Sabeh	1	0	0	0	1	0
36	MF	(Australia) AUS	Trypp McLachlan	1	0	0	0	1	0

=== Disciplinary record ===
Includes all competitions. The list is sorted by squad number when total cards are equal. Players with no cards not included in the list.

As of 22 November 2026

Rank	No.	Pos.	Nat.	Name	A-League Men			Australia Cup			Total		
Rank	No.	Pos.	Nat.	Name	Yellow card	(yellow card) (yellow-red card)	Red card	Yellow card	(yellow card) (yellow-red card)	Red card	Yellow card	(yellow card) (yellow-red card)	Red card
1	99	FW	(Australia)	Musa Toure	2	0	0	0	0	0	2	0	0
2	8	FW	(Indonesia)	Luke Vickery	1	0	0	0	0	0	1	0	0
2	9	FW	(Australia)	Ben Gibson	1	0	0	0	0	0	1	0	0
2	14	MF	(Australia)	Michael Pratezina	0	0	0	1	0	0	1	0	0
2	16	FW	(Australia)	Apostolos Stamatelopoulos	1	0	0	0	0	0	1	0	0
2	21	DF	(Australia)	Nathan Paull	1	0	0	0	0	0	1	0	0
2	22	MF	(Australia)	Liam Rose	1	0	0	0	0	0	1	0	0
2	24	FW	(Australia)	Dean Bosnjak	1	0	0	0	0	0	1	0	0
2	25	DF	(Australia)	Callum Talbot	0	0	0	1	0	0	1	0	0
2	31	DF	(Australia)	Sebastian Krslovic	0	0	0	1	0	0	1	0	0
Total					8	0	0	3	0	0	11	0	0

=== Clean sheets ===
Includes all competitions. The list is sorted by squad number when total clean sheets are equal. Numbers in parentheses represent games where both goalkeepers participated and both kept a clean sheet; the number in parentheses is awarded to the goalkeeper who was substituted on, whilst a full clean sheet is awarded to the goalkeeper who was on the field at the start of play. Goalkeepers with no clean sheets not included in the list.

As of match played 22 November 2026

Rank	No.	Nat.	Goalkeeper	A-League Men	Australia Cup	Total
1	1	(Australia)	Alexander Robinson	0	1	1
Total				1	1	2
