= 2023–24 Macarthur FC season =

Macarthur FC
2023–24 season
- Manager: Mile Sterjovski
- Stadium: Campbelltown Sports Stadium
- A-League Men: 5th
- A-League Men Finals: Elimination final
- Australia Cup: Round of 32
- AFC Cup: Zonal finals
- Top goalscorer: League: Valère Germain (12); All: Valère Germain (16)
- Highest home attendance: 7,723 vs. Sydney FC (20 April 2024); A-League Men
- Lowest home attendance: 1,582 vs. Phnom Penh Crown (9 November 2023); AFC Cup
- Average home league attendance: 4,216
- Biggest win: 8–2 vs. DH Cebu (H) (5 October 2023); AFC Cup
- Biggest defeat: 0–4 vs. Sydney FC (A) (4 May 2024); A-League Men Finals
Home colours	Away colours
- All statistics correct as of 4 May 2024.

The 2023–24 season was the fourth in the history of Macarthur Football Club since its establishment in 2017. The club competed in the A-League Men for the fourth time, the Australia Cup for the third time and the AFC Cup for the first time.

== Players ==
Note: Flags indicate national team as defined under FIFA eligibility rules; some limited exceptions apply. Players may hold more than one non-FIFA nationality.

No.	Pos.	Nation	Player
1	GK	AUS	Danijel Nizic
2	DF	AUS	Jake McGing
3	DF	NZL	Tommy Smith
4	DF	AUS	Matthew Jurman
6	DF	AUS	Tomislav Uskok
7	MF	AUS	Daniel De Silva
8	MF	AUS	Jake Hollman
10	MF	MEX	Ulises Dávila (captain)
12	GK	POL	Filip Kurto
13	DF	AUS	Ivan Vujica
14	MF	AUS	Kristian Popovic
15	MF	AUS	Kearyn Baccus
16	DF	AUS	Oliver Jones
17	FW	AUS	Raphael Borges Rodrigues
18	DF	AUS	Walter Scott (scholarship)

No.	Pos.	Nation	Player
20	DF	AUS	Kealey Adamson
21	FW	AUS	Bernardo Oliveira
22	DF	AUS	Yianni Nicolaou
23	MF	NZL	Clayton Lewis
24	MF	TAN	Charles M'Mombwa
27	MF	AUS	Jerry Skotadis
30	GK	AUS	Alexander Robinson (scholarship)
31	FW	AUS	Lachlan Rose
36	FW	AUS	Ali Auglah (scholarship)
37	FW	AUS	Jed Drew
44	DF	AUS	Matthew Millar
52	FW	AUS	Ariath Piol (scholarship)
98	FW	FRA	Valère Germain
—	MF	AUS	Frans Deli (scholarship)
—	MF	AUS	Oliver Randazzo (scholarship)

== Transfers ==
=== Transfers in ===
No.	Position	Player	Transferred from	Type/fee	Contract length	Date	Ref.
23	MF	(New Zealand) Clayton Lewis	Wellington Phoenix	Free transfer	2 years	8 May 2023	
4	DF	Matthew Jurman	Unattached	Free transfer	1 year	24 June 2023	
17	FW	Raphael Borges Rodrigues	Unattached	Free transfer	2 years	27 June 2023	
14	MF	Kristian Popovic	Unattached	Free transfer	2 years	3 July 2023	
7	MF	Daniel De Silva	Unattached	Free transfer	1 year	10 July 2023	
98	FW	(France) Valère Germain	Unattached	Free transfer	2 years	8 May 2023	
1	GK	Danijel Nizic	(Australia) Sydney United 58	Free transfer	1 year	10 August 2023	
22	DF	Yianni Nicolaou	(Australia) APIA Leichhardt	Free transfer	1 year	12 September 2023	
20	DF	Kealey Adamson	Sydney FC	Free transfer		7 December 2023	
21	FW	Bernardo Oliveira	Adelaide United	Free transfer		16 January 2024	
18	DF	Walter Scott	(Australia) Wollongong Wolves	Free transfer	5 month scholarship	30 January 2024	
3	DF	(New Zealand) Tommy Smith	(England) Milton Keynes Dons	Free transfer	5 months	6 February 2024	

==== From youth squad ====
N	Pos.	Nat.	Name	Age	Notes
52	FW	(Australia)	Ariath Piol	19	5 month scholarship contract
	MF	(Australia)	Frans Deli	18	2.5 year scholarship contract
	MF	(Australia)	Oliver Randazzo	17	scholarship contract

=== Transfers out ===
No.	Position	Player	Transferred to	Type/fee	Date	Ref.
1	GK	Nicholas Suman	Unattached	End of contract	18 May 2023	
9	FW	(Georgia (country)) Bachana Arabuli	Unattached	End of contract	18 May 2023	
15	DF	Aleksandar Šušnjar	Unattached	End of contract	18 May 2023	
17	MF	(England) Craig Noone	Unattached	End of contract	18 May 2023	
20	FW	(United States) Jason Romero	Unattached	End of contract	18 May 2023	
7	MF	Daniel De Silva	Unattached	End of contract	9 June 2023	
14	FW	Moudi Najjar	Unattached	End of contract	9 June 2023	
35	FW	Al Hassan Toure	Unattached	End of contract	9 June 2023	
99	FW	Daniel Arzani	Melbourne Victory	Mutual contract termination	7 July 2023	
	MF	Eddie Caspers	(Australia) APIA Leichhardt	Mutual contract termination	14 December 2023	
5	DF	Jonathan Aspropotamitis	(South Korea) Pohang Steelers	Undisclosed	28 December 2023	
32	DF	Isaac Hovar	(Australia) Hills United	Mutual contract termination	7 February 2024	

=== Contract extensions ===
No.	Name	Position	Duration	Date	Ref.
2	Jake McGing	DF	1 year	29 May 2023	
13	Ivan Vujica	DF	2 years	29 June 2023	
12	(Poland) Filip Kurto	GK	2 years	25 January 2024	Contract extended from end of 2023–24 until end of 2025–26.
22	Yianni Nicolaou	DF	1 year	31 January 2024	Contract extended from end of 2023–24 until end of 2024–25.
4	Matt Jurman	DF	1 year	15 March 2024	Contract extended from end of 2023–24 until end of 2024–25.
10	(Mexico) Ulises Dávila	MF	2 years	5 April 2024	Contract extended from end of 2023–24 until end of 2025–26.

== Pre-season and friendlies ==
23 August 2023	Sydney FC	3–1	Macarthur FC	Sydney
	Lolley 24'; Mak 40'; Glasson 80'	Report	Hollman 88'	Stadium: Sky Park

15 September 2023	Central Coast Mariners	2–2	Macarthur FC
		Report

28 September 2023	Newcastle Jets	3–0	Macarthur FC
	Stamatelopoulos; Natta; Dowse	Report

== Competitions ==
=== Overall record ===
Competition	First match	Last match	Starting round	Final position	Record							
Competition	First match	Last match	Starting round	Final position	Pld	W	D	L	GF	GA	GD	Win %
A-League Men	21 October 2023	27 April 2024	Matchday 1	5th	27	11	8	8	45	48	−3	40.74
A-League Men Finals	4 May 2024	4 May 2024	Elimination-finals	Elimination-finals	1	0	0	1	0	4	−4	0.00
Australia Cup	18 July 2023	14 August 2023	Play-offs	Round of 32	2	1	0	1	5	2	+3	50.00
AFC Cup	21 September 2023	22 February 2024	Group stage	Zonal final	8	6	0	2	28	8	+20	75.00
Total					38	18	8	12	78	62	+16	47.37

Last updated: 4 May 2024
Source: Soccerway

=== A-League Men ===
==== League table ====
Pos	Team	Pld	W	D	L	GF	GA	GD	Pts	Qualification
3	Melbourne Victory	27	10	12	5	43	33	+10	42	Qualification for Finals series (Note: The top two teams enter the finals series at the semi-finals, while the teams ranked third to sixth enter the finals series at the elimination-finals.)
4	Sydney FC	27	12	5	10	52	41	+11	41	Qualification for AFC Champions League Two and Finals series (Note: Qualified for AFC Champions League Two as the 2023 Australia Cup winners.)
5	Macarthur FC	27	11	8	8	45	48	−3	41	Qualification for Finals series
6	Melbourne City	27	11	6	10	50	38	+12	39	Qualification for Finals series
7	Western Sydney Wanderers	27	11	4	12	44	48	−4	37	

Source: A-Leagues
Rules for classification: 1) points; 2) wins; 3) goal difference; 4) goals scored; 5) head-to-head results; 5a) head-to-head points; 5b) head-to-head goal difference; 6) Fair Play points; 7) away goal difference; 8) away goals per match; 9) home goal difference; 10) home goals per match; 11) toss of a coin in an event of a tie of two clubs.

==== Results summary ====
Home figures include Macarthur FC's 3–3 draw on neutral ground against Western United on 12 January 2024.

Overall								Home						Away					
Pld	W	D	L	GF	GA	GD	Pts	W	D	L	GF	GA	GD	W	D	L	GF	GA	GD
27	11	8	8	45	48	−3	41	5	5	4	22	25	−3	6	3	4	23	23	0

Last updated: 27 April 2024.
Source: Ultimate A-League

==== Results by round ====
Round	1	2	3	4	5	6	7	8	9	10	11	12	27	13	14	15	16	17	18	19	20	21	22	23	24	25	26
Ground	H	A	H	A	H	H	A	H	A	A	H	A	N	A	H	H	A	H	A	H	H	A	H	A	A	H	A
Result	D	W	W	D	D	W	W	L	L	L	D	D	D	W	D	W	W	L	D	W	L	W	L	L	W	W	L
Position	7	5	4	4	6	3	1	4	4	5	6	6	7	5	5	4	3	3	4	3	4	3	4	5	5	4	5
Points	1	4	7	8	9	12	15	15	15	15	16	17	18	21	22	25	28	28	29	32	32	35	35	35	38	41	41

Updated to match(es) played on 27 April 2024. Source: Ultimate A-League
A = Away; H = Home; N = Neutral; W = Win; D = Draw; L = Loss

==== Matches ====
Win Draw Loss Fixtures

21 October 2023 1	Macarthur FC	1–1	Brisbane Roar	Sydney
15:30 AEDT	Rodrigues 52'	Report	O'Shea 73'	Stadium: Campbelltown Sports Stadium; Attendance: 3,002; Referee: Jonathan Barreiro

29 October 2023 2	Central Coast Mariners	1–2	Macarthur FC	Gosford
15:00 AEDT	Kaltak 90+1'	Report	Germain 57'; Baccus 84'	Stadium: Industree Group Stadium; Attendance: 6,553; Referee: Adam Kersey

4 November 2023 3	Macarthur FC	1–0	Western United	Sydney
17:30 AEDT	Auglah 90+3'	Report		Stadium: Campbelltown Sports Stadium; Attendance: 2,863; Referee: Alireza Faghani

12 November 2023 4	Melbourne City	3–3	Macarthur FC	Melbourne
15:00 AEDT	Maclaren 58', 90'; Antonis 90+3' (pen.)	Report	Dávila 61'; Hollman 83'; Millar 88'	Stadium: AAMI Park; Attendance: 5,712; Referee: Ben Abraham

24 November 2023 5	Macarthur FC	1–1	Melbourne Victory	Sydney
19:45 AEDT	Millar 12'	Report	Nicolaou 90+5' (o.g.)	Stadium: Campbelltown Sports Stadium; Attendance: 2,984; Referee: Alireza Faghani

4 December 2023 6	Macarthur FC	4–3	Adelaide United	Sydney
19:00 AEDT	Germain 8'; Millar 24'; Hollman 82'; Dávila 84'	Report	Clough 17', 53'; Bovalina 45+2'	Stadium: Campbelltown Sports Stadium; Attendance: 2,596; Referee: Shaun Evans
Note: Match originally scheduled for 3 December at 17:00 AEDT, but rescheduled due to a venue change of Macarthur FC's AFC Cup fixture against Shan United from Campbelltown Sports Stadium to BG Stadium in Thailand. It was rescheduled to 4 December at 19:00 AEDT.

9 December 2023 7	Sydney FC	0–2	Macarthur FC	Sydney
19:45 AEDT		Report	Hollman 28'; Germain 86'	Stadium: Allianz Stadium; Attendance: 8,006; Referee: Daniel Elder

18 December 2023 8	Macarthur FC	0–3	Wellington Phoenix	Sydney
19:00 AEDT		Report	Kraev 40'; Barbarouses 58', 61'	Stadium: Campbelltown Sports Stadium; Attendance: 4,893; Referee: Alex King

23 December 2023 9	Perth Glory	3–2	Macarthur FC	Perth
19:30 AWST	Khelifi 48'; Ivanovic 65'; Williams 90+3'	Report	Millar 30'; Germain 42'	Stadium: HBF Park; Attendance: 5,163; Referee: Adam Bavcar

1 January 2024 10	Western Sydney Wanderers	3–1	Macarthur FC	Sydney
17:00 AEDT	Antonsson 3'; Simmons 12'; Yuel 84'	Report	Hollman 20'	Stadium: CommBank Stadium; Attendance: 11,382; Referee: Shaun Evans

5 January 2024 11	Macarthur FC	1–1	Newcastle Jets	Sydney
19:45 AEDT	Germain 90+9' (pen.)	Report	Taylor 9'	Stadium: Campbelltown Stadium; Attendance: 4,234; Referee: Tim Danaskos

8 January 2024 12	Adelaide United	1–1	Macarthur FC	Adelaide
20:45 ACDT	Halloran 16'	Report	Germain 32'	Stadium: Coopers Stadium; Attendance: 9,426; Referee: Jack Morgan

12 January 2024 27	Macarthur FC	3–3	Western United	Sydney
17:30 AEDT	Dávila 32', 51', 90'	Report	Garuccio 3'; Penha 74', 85'	Stadium: CommBank Stadium; Attendance: 3,441; Referee: Adam Kersey

18 January 2024 13	Brisbane Roar	1–3	Macarthur FC	Brisbane
18:45 AEST	Markovski 62'	Report	Dávila 16'; Rodrigues 53'; Drew 59'	Stadium: Suncorp Stadium; Attendance: 5,278; Referee: Alex King

28 January 2024 14	Macarthur FC	2–2	Perth Glory	Sydney
17:00 AEDT	Dávila 9'; Germain 82' (pen.)	Report	Amini 72' (pen.); Williams 90+3'	Stadium: Campbelltown Sports Stadium; Attendance: 4,016; Referee: Daniel Elder

4 February 2024 15	Macarthur FC	4–3	Western Sydney Wanderers	Sydney
17:00 AEDT	Germain 18' (pen.), 45+4', 90+3'; Rodrigues 32'	Report	Brook 20', 42'; Milanovic 28'	Stadium: Campbelltown Sports Stadium; Attendance: 5,102; Referee: Adam Kersey

10 February 2024 16	Melbourne Victory	0–1	Macarthur FC	Melbourne
17:30 AEDT		Report	Hollman 21'	Stadium: AAMI Park; Attendance: 10,737; Referee: Tim Danaskos

18 February 2024 17	Macarthur FC	1–2	Wellington Phoenix	Sydney
17:00 AEDT	Bernardo 78'	Report	Barbarouses 31' (pen.), 73'	Stadium: Campbelltown Sports Stadium; Attendance: 3,024; Referee: Shaun Evans

24 February 2024 18	Newcastle Jets	2–2	Macarthur FC	Newcastle
18:00 AEDT	Dávila 69'; Germain 81'	Report	Goodwin 71'; Stamatelopoulos 89' (pen.)	Stadium: McDonald Jones Stadium; Attendance: 4,789; Referee: Jonathan Barreiro

1 March 2024 19	Macarthur FC	2–0	Melbourne City	Sydney
19:45 AEDT	Bernardo 47', 57'	Report		Stadium: Campbelltown Sports Stadium; Attendance: 3,452; Referee: Adam Bavcar

10 March 2024 20	Macarthur FC	0–3	Central Coast Mariners	Sydney
17:00 AEDT		Report	Nisbet 8'; Barcellos 19'; Edmondson 55'	Stadium: Campbelltown Sports Stadium; Attendance: 4,687; Referee: Daniel Elder
Note: Originally scheduled for 9 March 2024, was moved due to Central Coast Mariners participating in the 2023–24 AFC Cup.

16 March 2024 21	Brisbane Roar	1–2	Macarthur FC	Brisbane
15:00 AEDT	Berenguer 14'	Report	Uskok 26'; Rodrigues 42'	Stadium: Ballymore Stadium; Attendance: 3,178; Referee: Alex King

1 April 2024 22	Macarthur FC	1–3	Western Sydney Wanderers	Sydney
15:00 AEDT	Millar 86'	Report	Milanovic 57'; Kittel 65'; Hendrix 70'	Stadium: Campbelltown Sports Stadium; Attendance: 6,238; Referee: Alireza Faghani

6 April 2024 23	Western United	4–2	Macarthur FC	Melbourne
15:30 AEDT	Danzaki 52'; Ruhs 56', 66'; Grimaldi 59'	Report	Germain 17' (pen.); Dávila 24'	Stadium: Ironbark Fields; Attendance: 3,430; Referee: Shaun Evans

12 April 2024 24	Adelaide United	1–2	Macarthur FC	Adelaide
19:15 ACST	Irankunda 21'	Report	Piol 84'; Smith 88'	Stadium: Coopers Stadium; Attendance: 12,562; Referee: Ben Abraham

20 April 2024 25	Macarthur FC	1–0	Sydney FC	Sydney
19:45 AEST	Drew 45+4'	Report		Stadium: Campbelltown Sports Stadium; Attendance: 7,723; Referee: Daniel Elder

27 April 2024 26	Wellington Phoenix	3–0	Macarthur FC	Wellington
19:15 NZST	Barbarouses 22'; Payne 29'; Zawada 90+2' (pen.)	Report		Stadium: Sky Stadium; Attendance: 15,428; Referee: Ben Abraham

==== Finals Series ====
4 May 2024 Elimination-finals	Sydney FC	4–0	Macarthur FC	Sydney
19:45 AEST	Mak 8', 78'; Lolley 50'; Kucharski 67'	Report		Stadium: Allianz Stadium; Attendance: 11,792; Referee: Alireza Faghani

=== Australia Cup ===
18 July 2023 Play-offs	Perth Glory	0–4	Macarthur FC	Darwin
19:00 ACST		Report	Sail 2' (o.g.); Rose 18'; Hollman 34'; Drew 80'	Stadium: Larrakia Park; Attendance: 1,446; Referee: Daniel Elder

14 August 2023 Round of 32	Campbelltown City (South Australia)	2–1	Macarthur FC	Adelaide
19:00 ACST	Yoshikawa 44'; Trimboli 51'	Report	Rose 90+3'	Stadium: Steve Woodcock Sports Centre; Attendance: 947; Referee: Adam Bavcar

=== AFC Cup ===
==== Group stage ====
The draw for the group stage was held on 24 August 2023.

Pos	Team	Pld	W	D	L	GF	GA	GD	Pts	Qualification
1	(Australia) Macarthur FC	6	5	0	1	23	5	+18	15	Zonal semi-finals
2	(Cambodia) Phnom Penh Crown	6	4	0	2	15	7	+8	12	Zonal semi-finals
3	(Philippines) DH Cebu	6	1	1	4	4	19	−15	4 (Note: Ranked on head-to-head points: DH Cebu 4, Shan United 1.)	
4	(Myanmar) Shan United	6	1	1	4	3	14	−11	4	

Source: AFC
Rules for classification: Group stage tiebreakers
Notes:

21 September 2023 1	Shan United (Myanmar)	0–3	(Australia) Macarthur FC	Yangon, Myanmar
18:30 MST		Report	Germain 20' (pen.); Auglah 84'; Rose 90+5'	Stadium: Thuwunna Stadium; Attendance: 3,200; Referee: Tam Ping Wun (Hong Kong)

5 October 2023 2	Macarthur FC (Australia)	8–2	(Philippines) DH Cebu	Sydney
19:00 AEDT	Dávila 6'; B. Tasci 19' (o.g.); Germain 26', 36'; Baccus 37'; Drew 44'; Rodrigues 49'; Hollman 81'	Report	Jurman 84' (o.g.); Hama 89'	Stadium: Campbelltown Sports Stadium; Attendance: 2,012; Referee: Hiroki Kasahara (Japan)

26 October 2023 3	Phnom Penh Crown (Cambodia)	3–0	(Australia) Macarthur FC	Phnom Penh, Cambodia
19:00 UTC+7	Shimizu 75', 86'; Socheavila 90+4'	Report		Stadium: Olympic Stadium; Attendance: 4,789; Referee: Adam Fazeel (Maldives)

9 November 2023 4	Macarthur FC (Australia)	5–0	(Cambodia) Phnom Penh Crown	Sydney
19:00 AEST	Germain 17' (pen.); Rodrigues 20'; Dávila 40'; Uskok 81'; Rose 90'	Report		Stadium: Campbelltown Sports Stadium; Attendance: 1,582; Referee: Kim Sang-woo (South Korea)

30 November 2023 5	Macarthur FC (Australia)	4–0	(Myanmar) Shan United	Pathum Thani, Thailand
19:00 AEST	De Silva 46'; Hollman 57'; Uskok 63'; Skotadis 90'	Report		Stadium: BG Stadium; Attendance: 67; Referee: Suhaizi Shukri (Malaysia)
Note: Match was originally set to be played at Campbelltown Sports Stadium, but was changed to be played at BG Stadium in Thailand due to Shan United unable to be granted entry for Australia.

14 December 2023 6	DH Cebu (Philippines)	0–3	(Australia) Macarthur FC	Manila, Philippines
20:00 UTC+8		Report	Millar 3'; Drew 67'; Auglah 90+4'	Stadium: Rizal Memorial Stadium; Referee: Yudi Nurcahya (Japan)

==== Knockout stage ====
13 February 2024 Zonal SF	Macarthur FC (Australia)	3–0	(Malaysia) Sabah	Sydney
15:00 AEDT	Dávila 40'; Drew 46', 80'	Report		Stadium: Campbelltown Sports Stadium; Attendance: 2,225; Referee: Nasrullo Kabirov (Tajikistan)

22 February 2024 Zonal final	Macarthur FC (Australia)	2–3 (a.e.t.)	(Australia) Central Coast Mariners	Sydney
19:00 AEDT	Dávila 88'; Rose 92'	Report	Torres 81'; Doka 105+3'; Barcellos 120'	Stadium: Campbelltown Sports Stadium; Attendance: 2,827

== Statistics ==
=== Appearances and goals ===
As of match played 4 May 2024

Players with no appearances not included in the list.

No.	Pos	Nat	Player	Total		A-League Men		Australia Cup		AFC Cup	
No.	Pos	Nat	Player	Apps	Goals	Apps	Goals	Apps	Goals	Apps	Goals
1	GK	(Australia) AUS	Danijel Nizic	3	0	0+0	0	0+0	0	3+0	0
3	DF	(New Zealand) NZL	Tommy Smith	9	1	5+3	1	0+0	0	0+1	0
4	DF	(Australia) AUS	Matthew Jurman	23	0	15+1	0	0+0	0	7+0	0
6	DF	(Australia) AUS	Tomislav Uskok	34	3	26+0	1	2+0	0	6+0	2
7	MF	(Australia) AUS	Daniel De Silva	16	1	3+9	0	0+0	0	4+0	1
8	MF	(Australia) AUS	Jake Hollman	32	8	15+10	5	1+0	1	5+1	2
10	MF	(Mexico) MEX	Ulises Dávila	32	13	23+2	9	1+0	0	6+0	4
12	GK	(Poland) POL	Filip Kurto	34	0	28+0	0	1+0	0	5+0	0
13	DF	(Australia) AUS	Ivan Vujica	31	0	25+0	0	1+0	0	5+0	0
14	MF	(Australia) AUS	Kristian Popovic	12	0	2+8	0	0+0	0	0+2	0
15	MF	(Australia) AUS	Kearyn Baccus	28	2	21+2	1	1+0	0	3+1	1
16	DF	(Australia) AUS	Oliver Jones	12	0	1+6	0	1+0	0	1+3	0
17	FW	(Australia) AUS	Raphael Borges Rodrigues	35	6	22+4	4	1+1	0	6+1	2
18	DF	(Australia) AUS	Walter Scott	5	0	1+3	0	0+0	0	0+1	0
19	MF	(Australia) AUS	Jesper Webber	7	0	0+1	0	1+1	0	0+4	0
20	DF	(Australia) AUS	Kealey Adamson	15	0	11+2	0	0+0	0	1+1	0
21	FW	(Australia) AUS	Bernardo Oliveira	10	3	4+4	3	0+0	0	1+1	0
22	DF	(Australia) AUS	Yianni Nicolaou	25	0	15+4	0	0+0	0	5+1	0
23	MF	(New Zealand) NZL	Clayton Lewis	34	0	24+2	0	1+0	0	7+0	0
24	MF	(Tanzania) TAN	Charles M'Mombwa	15	0	1+7	0	0+2	0	1+4	0
27	MF	(Australia) AUS	Jerry Skotadis	10	1	0+7	0	0+0	0	0+3	1
30	GK	(Australia) AUS	Alexander Robinson	1	0	0+0	0	1+0	0	0+0	0
31	FW	(Australia) AUS	Lachlan Rose	28	5	3+17	0	2+0	2	1+5	3
36	FW	(Australia) AUS	Ali Auglah	22	3	1+13	1	0+2	0	1+5	2
37	FW	(Australia) AUS	Jed Drew	36	7	18+8	2	1+1	1	4+4	4
44	DF	(Australia) AUS	Matthew Millar	16	6	5+4	5	2+0	0	5+0	1
52	FW	(Australia) AUS	Ariath Piol	3	1	0+2	1	0+0	0	0+1	0
53	DF	(Australia) AUS	Joel Bertolissio	3	0	0+2	0	0+1	0	0+0	0
98	FW	(France) FRA	Valère Germain	36	16	28+0	12	1+0	0	7+0	4
Players who featured but departed the club permanently during the season:
5	DF	(Australia) AUS	Jonathan Aspropotamitis	13	0	9+0	0	1+1	0	2+0	0
32	DF	(Australia) AUS	Isaac Hovar	8	0	3+0	0	1+1	0	3+0	0
52	MF	(Australia) AUS	Rhys Youlley	2	0	0+0	0	2+0	0	0+0	0

=== Disciplinary record ===
Includes all competitions. The list is sorted by squad number when total cards are equal. Players with no cards not included in the list.

As of 4 May 2024

Rank	No.	Pos.	Nat.	Name	A-League Men			A-League Men Finals			Australia Cup			AFC Cup			Total		
Rank	No.	Pos.	Nat.	Name	Yellow card	(yellow card) (yellow-red card)	Red card	Yellow card	(yellow card) (yellow-red card)	Red card	Yellow card	(yellow card) (yellow-red card)	Red card	Yellow card	(yellow card) (yellow-red card)	Red card	Yellow card	(yellow card) (yellow-red card)	Red card
1	22	DF	(Australia)	Yianni Nicolaou	4	0	1	0	0	0	0	0	0	1	0	0	5	0	1
2	20	DF	(Australia)	Kealey Adamson	3	0	0	0	0	1	0	0	0	0	0	0	3	0	1
3	3	DF	(New Zealand)	Tommy Smith	0	0	1	0	0	0	0	0	0	0	0	0	0	0	1
4	15	MF	(Australia)	Kearyn Baccus	7	0	0	0	0	0	0	0	0	1	0	0	8	0	0
5	4	DF	(Australia)	Matthew Jurman	5	0	0	0	0	0	0	0	0	0	0	0	5	0	0
5	8	MF	(Australia)	Jake Hollman	3	0	0	1	0	0	0	0	0	1	0	0	5	0	0
5	10	MF	(Mexico)	Ulises Dávila	4	0	0	0	0	0	0	0	0	1	0	0	5	0	0
5	17	FW	(Australia)	Raphael Borges Rodrigues	5	0	0	0	0	0	0	0	0	0	0	0	5	0	0
5	23	MF	(New Zealand)	Clayton Lewis	5	0	0	0	0	0	0	0	0	0	0	0	5	0	0
5	36	FW	(Australia)	Ali Auglah	3	0	0	0	0	0	0	0	0	2	0	0	5	0	0
5	98	FW	(France)	Valère Germain	5	0	0	0	0	0	0	0	0	0	0	0	5	0	0
12	6	DF	(Australia)	Tomislav Uskok	3	0	0	0	0	0	0	0	0	1	0	0	4	0	0
12	37	FW	(Australia)	Jed Drew	3	0	0	0	0	0	0	0	0	1	0	0	4	0	0
14	24	MF	(Tanzania)	Charles M'Mombwa	2	0	0	0	0	0	1	0	0	0	0	0	3	0	0
15	13	DF	(Australia)	Ivan Vujica	2	0	0	0	0	0	0	0	0	0	0	0	2	0	0
15	44	DF	(Australia)	Matthew Millar	0	0	0	0	0	0	1	0	0	1	0	0	2	0	0
17	7	MF	(Australia)	Daniel De Silva	1	0	0	0	0	0	0	0	0	0	0	0	1	0	0
17	12	GK	(Poland)	Filip Kurto	1	0	0	0	0	0	0	0	0	0	0	0	1	0	0
17	16	DF	(Australia)	Oliver Jones	1	0	0	0	0	0	0	0	0	0	0	0	1	0	0
17	21	MF	(Australia)	Bernardo	1	0	0	0	0	0	0	0	0	0	0	0	1	0	0
17	31	FW	(Australia)	Lachlan Rose	1	0	0	0	0	0	0	0	0	0	0	0	1	0	0
Player(s) transferred out but featured this season
1	5	DF	(Australia)	Jonathan Aspropotamitis	4	0	0	0	0	0	0	0	0	0	0	0	4	0	0
2	32	DF	(Australia)	Isaac Hovar	1	0	0	0	0	0	0	0	0	0	0	0	1	0	0
Total					63	0	2	1	0	1	2	0	0	9	0	0	75	0	3

Note: Ivan Vujica's suspension for his red card on 20 April 2024 against Sydney FC was rescinded.

=== Clean sheets ===
Includes all competitions. The list is sorted by squad number when total clean sheets are equal. Numbers in parentheses represent games where both goalkeepers participated and both kept a clean sheet; the number in parentheses is awarded to the goalkeeper who was substituted on, whilst a full clean sheet is awarded to the goalkeeper who was on the field at the start and end of play. Goalkeepers with no clean sheets not included in the list.

As of 4 May 2024

Rank	No.	Nat.	Goalkeeper	A-League Men	A-League Men Finals	Australia Cup	AFC Cup	Total
1	12	(Poland)	Filip Kurto	5	0	0	4	9
2	1	(Australia)	Danijel Nizic	0	0	0	1	1
2	30	(Australia)	Alexander Robinson	0	0	1	0	1
Total				5	0	1	5	11
