= 2018–19 AFC Bournemouth season =

AFC Bournemouth
2018–19 season
- Owner: Maxim Demin
- Chairman: Jeff Mostyn
- Manager: Eddie Howe
- Stadium: Dean Court
- Premier League: 14th
- FA Cup: Third round
- EFL Cup: Quarter-finals
- Top goalscorer: League: Callum Wilson (14); All: Callum Wilson (15)
- Highest home attendance: League/All: 10,986 (20 Oct 2018 v. Southampton)
- Lowest home attendance: League: 9,980 (4 December 2018 v. Huddersfield Town); All: 9,715 (25 September 2018 v. Blackburn Rovers, EFL Cup)
- Average home league attendance: 10,532
- Biggest win: 5–0 (13 April 2019 v. Brighton & Hove Albion)
- Biggest defeat: 0–5 (26 December 2018 v. Tottenham Hotspur)
Home colours	Away colours	Third colours

The 2018–19 AFC Bournemouth season was the club's fourth consecutive season in the top flight of English football and their 129th year in existence. This season Bournemouth participated in the Premier League as well as the FA Cup and EFL Cup.

The season covered the period from 1 July 2018 to 30 June 2019.

== Squad ==
As of 9 August 2018

Note: Flags indicate national team as defined under FIFA eligibility rules; some limited exceptions apply. Players may hold more than one non-FIFA nationality.

No.	Pos.	Nation	Player
1	GK	POL	Artur Boruc
2	DF	ENG	Simon Francis (captain)
3	DF	ENG	Steve Cook
4	MF	ENG	Dan Gosling
5	DF	NED	Nathan Aké
6	MF	ENG	Andrew Surman (vice-captain)
7	MF	ENG	Marc Pugh
8	MF	COL	Jefferson Lerma
9	FW	FRA	Lys Mousset
10	MF	ENG	Jordon Ibe
11	DF	ENG	Charlie Daniels
12	GK	ENG	Aaron Ramsdale
13	FW	ENG	Callum Wilson

No.	Pos.	Nation	Player
15	DF	ENG	Adam Smith
16	MF	ENG	Lewis Cook
17	FW	NOR	Joshua King
18	FW	ENG	Jermain Defoe
19	MF	ENG	Junior Stanislas
20	MF	WAL	David Brooks
21	DF	ESP	Diego Rico
24	MF	SCO	Ryan Fraser
25	DF	ENG	Jack Simpson
26	DF	ENG	Tyrone Mings
27	GK	BIH	Asmir Begović
28	MF	ENG	Kyle Taylor

== Transfers ==
=== Transfers in ===
Date from	Position	Nationality	Name	From	Fee	Ref.
1 July 2018	AM	(Wales)	David Brooks	Sheffield United	£11,500,000	
24 July 2018	LB	(Spain)	Diego Rico	(Spain) Leganés	Undisclosed	
7 August 2018	DM	(Colombia)	Jefferson Lerma	(Spain) Levante	Undisclosed	
4 January 2019	FW	(England)	Dominic Solanke	Liverpool	£19,000,000	
22 January 2019	CB	(Wales)	Chris Mepham	Brentford	£12,000,000	

=== Transfers out ===
Date from	Position	Nationality	Name	To	Fee	Ref.
1 July 2018	CF	(Democratic Republic of the Congo)	Benik Afobe	Wolverhampton Wanderers	£10,000,000	
1 July 2018	GK	(England)	Ryan Allsop	Wycombe Wanderers	Free Transfer	
1 July 2018	CB	(England)	Baily Cargill	Milton Keynes Dons	Released	
1 July 2018	LW	(Ivory Coast)	Max Gradel	(France) Toulouse	Undisclosed	
1 July 2018	GK	(England)	Patrick O'Flaherty	Gosport Borough	Released	
1 July 2018	LB	(England)	Ollie Harfield	Dagenham & Redbridge	Released	
1 July 2018	CM	(England)	Sam Matthews	Bristol Rovers	Released	
1 July 2018	CF	(Republic of Ireland)	Joe Quigley	Maidstone United	Released	
1 July 2018	LB	(Wales)	Rhoys Wiggins	Retired	—N/a	
3 July 2018	GK	(Australia)	Adam Federici	Stoke City	Undisclosed	
6 July 2018	CF	(England)	Lewis Grabban	Nottingham Forest	Undisclosed	
30 August 2018	CM	(England)	Ben Whitfield	Port Vale	Free transfer	
18 January 2019	CM	(England)	Matt Worthington	Yeovil Town	Free transfer	

=== Loans in ===
Start date	Position	Nationality	Name	From	End date	Ref.
4 January 2019	RB	(England)	Nathaniel Clyne	Liverpool	31 May 2019	
19 February 2019	GK	(Iceland)	Rafal Stefán Daníelsson	(Iceland) Fram Reykjavík	31 May 2019	

=== Loans out ===
Start date	Position	Nationality	Name	To	End date	Ref.
4 July 2018	LW	(England)	Mikael Ndjoli	(Scotland) Kilmarnock	31 May 2019	
30 July 2018	CF	(England)	Sam Surridge	Oldham Athletic	31 May 2019	
7 August 2018	RW	(England)	Connor Mahoney	Birmingham City	31 May 2019	
8 August 2018	CM	(United States)	Emerson Hyndman	(Scotland) Hibernian	1 January 2019	
8 August 2018	LB	(Australia)	Brad Smith	(United States) Seattle Sounders FC	31 May 2019	
9 August 2018	CM	(Republic of Ireland)	Harry Arter	(Wales) Cardiff City	31 May 2019	
31 August 2018	CM	(England)	Matt Worthington	Forest Green Rovers	January 2019	
30 October 2018	CF	(England)	Jake Scrimshaw	Poole Town	December 2018	
22 December 2018	CB	(Scotland)	Brennan Camp	Dorchester Town	27 March 2019	
3 January 2019	CF	(England)	Jermain Defoe	(Scotland) Rangers	31 May 2020	
4 January 2019	GK	(England)	Aaron Ramsdale	AFC Wimbledon	31 May 2019	
11 January 2019	MF	(England)	James Boote	Poole Town	31 May 2019	
11 January 2019	RM	(Romania)	Alex Dobre	Yeovil Town	31 May 2019	
15 January 2019	FW	(England)	Tyrell Skeen-Hamilton	Salisbury	31 May 2019	
18 January 2019	GK	(Australia)	Jordan Holmes	(Scotland) St Mirren	31 May 2019	
22 January 2019	LW	(England)	Marc Pugh	Hull City	31 May 2019	
24 January 2019	DF	(England)	Charlie Seaman	(Scotland) Dundee United	31 May 2019	
30 January 2019	RM	(England)	Keelan O'Connell	(Scotland) Greenock Morton	31 May 2019	
31 January 2019	CB	(England)	Corey Jordan	Eastbourne Borough	31 May 2019	
31 January 2019	CB	(England)	Tyrone Mings	Aston Villa	31 May 2019	
31 January 2019	AM	(England)	Frank Vincent	Torquay United	31 May 2019	
1 February 2019	CB	(England)	Shaun Hobson	Eastleigh	31 May 2019	
28 March 2019	CB	(Scotland)	Brennan Camp	Weymouth	31 May 2019	

== Pre-season ==
14 July 2018 Friendly	Sevilla	1–1	Bournemouth	Murcia, Spain
20:00 CEST	Ben Yedder 25'	Report	Ibe 68'	Stadium: Pinatar Arena

20 July 2018 Friendly	Levante	3–4	Bournemouth	Murcia, Spain
20:00 CEST	Roger 19', 36'; Boateng 23'	Report	Hyndman 9'; Defoe 13'; Simpson 42'; L. Cook 86'	Stadium: Pinatar Arena

27 July 2018 Friendly	Bristol City	1–1	Bournemouth	Bristol
19:00 BST	Weimann 38'	Report	King 14'	Stadium: Ashton Gate Stadium; Attendance: 0

28 July 2018 Friendly	Nottingham Forest	2–0	Bournemouth	West Bridgford
15:00 BST	Darikwa 36'; Dias 48'	Report		Stadium: The City Ground

3 August 2018 Friendly	Bournemouth	0–2	Real Betis	Boscombe
19:00 BST		Report	Boudebouz 17'; Loren 90+2'	Stadium: Vitality Stadium

4 August 2018 Friendly	Bournemouth	5–2	Marseille	Boscombe
15:00 BST	Smith 1'; King 25', 34'; Fraser 47'; Wilson 50'		Germain 64'; Cabella 89'	Stadium: Vitality Stadium

== Competitions ==
=== Premier League ===
==== League table ====
Pos	Team	Pld	W	D	L	GF	GA	GD	Pts
12	Crystal Palace	38	14	7	17	51	53	−2	49
13	Newcastle United	38	12	9	17	42	48	−6	45
14	Bournemouth	38	13	6	19	56	70	−14	45
15	Burnley	38	11	7	20	45	68	−23	40
16	Southampton	38	9	12	17	45	65	−20	39

Source: Premier League
Rules for classification: 1) Points; 2) Goal difference; 3) Goals scored; 4) Play-offs (only if needed to decide champion, teams for relegation or teams for UEFA competitions).

==== Results summary ====
Overall								Home						Away					
Pld	W	D	L	GF	GA	GD	Pts	W	D	L	GF	GA	GD	W	D	L	GF	GA	GD
38	13	6	19	56	70	−14	45	8	5	6	30	25	+5	5	1	13	26	45	−19

Last updated: 12 May 2019.
Source: Premier League

==== Results by matchday ====
Matchday	1	2	3	4	5	6	7	8	9	10	11	12	13	14	15	16	17	18	19	20	21	22	23	24	25	26	27	28	29	30	31	32	33	34	35	36	37	38
Ground	H	A	H	A	H	A	H	A	H	A	H	A	H	A	H	H	A	H	A	A	H	A	H	H	A	A	H	A	H	A	H	A	H	A	H	A	H	A
Result	W	W	D	L	W	L	W	W	D	W	L	L	L	L	W	L	L	W	L	L	D	L	W	W	L	L	D	L	L	W	D	L	L	W	L	D	W	L
Position	3	6	6	6	5	8	7	6	6	6	6	6	8	9	6	8	11	8	11	12	12	12	12	10	10	11	10	12	12	12	12	12	13	12	13	14	14	14

Updated to match(es) played on 12 May 2019. Source: Statto.com
A = Away; H = Home; W = Win; D = Draw; L = Loss

==== Matches ====
On 14 June 2018, the Premier League fixtures for the forthcoming season were announced.

11 August 2018 1	Bournemouth	2–0	Cardiff City	Bournemouth
15:00 BST	Fraser 24'; Daniels (yellow card) 43'; Wilson 90'	Report	Peltier (yellow card) 3'	Stadium: Dean Court; Attendance: 10,353; Referee: Kevin Friend

18 August 2018 2	West Ham United	1–2	Bournemouth	Stratford
15:00 BST	Arnautović 33' (pen.); Noble (yellow card) 40'; Ogbonna (yellow card) 65'; Wilshere (yellow card) 77'; Anderson (yellow card) 89'; Zabaleta (yellow card) 90+1'; Yarmolenko (yellow card) 90+3'	Report	King (yellow card) 59'; Wilson 60'; S. Cook 66'	Stadium: London Stadium; Attendance: 56,888; Referee: Stuart Attwell

25 August 2018 3	Bournemouth	2–2	Everton	Bournemouth
15:00 BST	Smith (red card) 61'; King 75' (pen.); Aké 79'	Report	Richarlison (red card) 41'; Sigurðsson (yellow card) 55'; Walcott 56'; Keane 66'; Tosun (yellow card) 70'; Gueye (yellow card) 81'	Stadium: Dean Court; Attendance: 10,654; Referee: Lee Probert

1 September 2018 4	Chelsea	2–0	Bournemouth	Fulham
15:00 BST	Alonso (yellow card) 33'; Kanté (yellow card) 55'; Pedro 72'; Hazard 85'	Report	Gosling (yellow card) 20'; Lerma (yellow card) 70'	Stadium: Stamford Bridge; Attendance: 40,178; Referee: Lee Mason

15 September 2018 5	Bournemouth	4–2	Leicester City	Bournemouth
15:00 BST	Fraser 19', 37'; Lerma (yellow card) 29'; King 41' (pen.); Wilson (yellow card) 71'; Gosling (yellow card) 79'; Smith 81'	Report	Maguire (yellow card) 12'; Morgan (yellow card) 45+2' (yellow-red card) 69'; Schmeichel (yellow card) 70'; Maddison 88' (pen.); Albrighton 89'	Stadium: Dean Court; Attendance: 10,543; Referee: Craig Pawson

22 September 2018 6	Burnley	4–0	Bournemouth	Burnley
15:00 BST	Lowton (yellow card) 31'; Westwood (yellow card) 56'; Vydra 39'; Lennon 41'; Barnes 83', 88'	Report		Stadium: Turf Moor; Attendance: 18,636; Referee: Anthony Taylor

1 October 2018 7	Bournemouth	2–1	Crystal Palace	Bournemouth
20:00 BST	Brooks 5', (yellow card) 29'; Stanislas 87' (pen.); Lerma (yellow card) 90'	Report	van Aanholt 55'; Townsend (yellow card) 76'; Sakho (yellow card) 86'; Kouyaté (yellow card) 90'; Tomkins (yellow card) 90'	Stadium: Dean Court; Attendance: 10,199; Referee: Mike Dean

6 October 2018 8	Watford	0–4	Bournemouth	Watford
15:00 BST	Cathcart (yellow card) 22'; Kabasele (yellow card) 11' (yellow-red card) 32'; Holebas (yellow card) 68'; Doucouré (yellow card) 89'	Report	Brooks 14'; King 33' (pen.), 45'; Wilson 47'; Surman (yellow card) 87'	Stadium: Vicarage Road; Attendance: 20,139; Referee: Jonathan Moss

20 October 2018 9	Bournemouth	0–0	Southampton	Bournemouth
15:00 BST	Wilson (yellow card) 86'	Report	Bertrand (yellow card) 34'; Lemina (yellow card) 41'	Stadium: Dean Court; Attendance: 10,986; Referee: Lee Probert

27 October 2018 10	Fulham	0–3	Bournemouth	Fulham
15:00 BST	Kamara (yellow card) 17'; McDonald (yellow card) 51' (yellow-red card) 73'; Mitrović (yellow card) 88'	Report	Wilson 14' (pen.), 85'; Brooks 72'; S. Cook (yellow card) 74'	Stadium: Craven Cottage; Attendance: 25,071; Referee: Andre Marriner

3 November 2018 11	Bournemouth	1–2	Manchester United	Bournemouth
12:30 GMT	Wilson 11', (yellow card) 64' Lerma (yellow card) 58' Stanislas (yellow card) 63' Smith (yellow card) 83'	Report	Martial 35' Shaw (yellow card) 54' Young (yellow card) 82'; Rashford 90+2', (yellow card) 90+3'	Stadium: Dean Court; Attendance: 10,792; Referee: Paul Tierney

10 November 2018 12	Newcastle United	2–1	Bournemouth	Newcastle upon Tyne
15:00 GMT	Rondón 7', 40', (yellow card) 90+3'; Schär (yellow card) 45'	Report	Lerma 45+6'; L. Cook (yellow card) 90+3'	Stadium: St James' Park; Attendance: 49,266; Referee: Lee Probert

25 November 2018 13	Bournemouth	1–2	Arsenal	Bournemouth
13:30 GMT	King 45+2'; Aké (yellow card) 52'; Lerma (yellow card) 66'	Report	Papastathopoulos (yellow card) 25'; Lerma 30' (o.g.); Aubameyang 67'	Stadium: Dean Court; Attendance: 10,792; Referee: Craig Pawson

1 December 2018 14	Manchester City	3–1	Bournemouth	Manchester
15:00 GMT	B. Silva 16'; Sterling 57'; Gündoğan 79'	Report	Wilson 44'	Stadium: City of Manchester Stadium; Attendance: 54,409; Referee: Stuart Attwell

4 December 2018 15	Bournemouth	2–1	Huddersfield Town	Bournemouth
19:45 GMT	Wilson 5'; Fraser 22'; Daniels (yellow card) 64'; Francis (yellow card) 73'; Mousset (yellow card) 90'; L. Cook (yellow card) 90+4'	Report	Kongolo 38'; Mooy (yellow card) 57'; Billing (yellow card) 61'	Stadium: Dean Court; Attendance: 9,980; Referee: Roger East

8 December 2018 16	Bournemouth	0–4	Liverpool	Bournemouth
12:30 GMT	Aké (yellow card) 12'; Lerma (yellow card) 15'	Report	Salah 25', 48', 77'; S. Cook 68' (o.g.); Fabinho (yellow card) 70'	Stadium: Dean Court; Attendance: 10,752; Referee: Lee Mason

15 December 2018 17	Wolverhampton Wanderers	2–0	Bournemouth	Wolverhampton
15:00 GMT	Jiménez 12'; Costa (yellow card) 66'; Cavaleiro 90+4'	Report	S. Cook (yellow card) 34'; Lerma (yellow card) 39'	Stadium: Molineux; Attendance: 30,997; Referee: Simon Hooper

22 December 2018 18	Bournemouth	2–0	Brighton & Hove Albion	Bournemouth
15:00 GMT	Brooks 21', (yellow card) 43', (goal) 77'; Lerma (yellow card) 31'	Report	Dunk (yellow card) 62' (yellow-red card) 73'	Stadium: Vitality Stadium; Attendance: 10,491; Referee: Mike Dean

26 December 2018 19	Tottenham Hotspur	5–0	Bournemouth	London
15:00 GMT	Eriksen 16'; Son Heung-min 23', 70' (yellow card) 76'; Lucas Moura 35'; Kane 61'; Winks (yellow card) 87'	Report	Lerma (yellow card) 45+4'	Stadium: Wembley Stadium; Attendance: 45,154; Referee: Chris Kavanagh

30 December 2018 20	Manchester United	4–1	Bournemouth	Manchester
16:30 GMT	Pogba 5', 33'; Young (yellow card) 36'; Rashford 45'; Herrera (yellow card) 51'; Lukaku 72'; Bailly (red card) 79'	Report	Aké 45+2'	Stadium: Old Trafford; Attendance: 74,556; Referee: Lee Mason

2 January 2019 21	Bournemouth	3–3	Watford	Bournemouth
19:45 GMT	Aké 34'; Wilson 37'; Fraser 40'; Gosling (yellow card) 60'	Report	Deeney 14', 27'; Doucouré (yellow card) 29'; Sema 38'; Capoue (yellow card) 50'	Stadium: Vitality Stadium; Attendance: 10,261; Referee: David Coote

13 January 2019 22	Everton	2–0	Bournemouth	Liverpool
14:15 GMT	Bernard (yellow card) 38'; Zouma 61' (yellow card) 66'; Keane (yellow card) 65'; Gomes (yellow card) 66'; Richarlison (yellow card) 84'; Calvert-Lewin 90+5'	Report		Stadium: Goodison Park; Attendance: 38,113; Referee: Anthony Taylor

19 January 2019 23	Bournemouth	2–0	West Ham United	Bournemouth
15:00 GMT	Wilson 53'; King 90+1'	Report	Carroll (yellow card) 18'	Stadium: Vitality Stadium; Attendance: 10,495; Referee: Simon Hooper

30 January 2019 24	Bournemouth	4–0	Chelsea	Bournemouth
19:45 GMT	King 47', 74'; Brooks 63'; Surman (yellow card) 72'; Daniels 90+5'	Report		Stadium: Vitality Stadium; Attendance: 10,227; Referee: Roger East

2 February 2019 25	Cardiff City	2–0	Bournemouth	Cardiff
17:30 GMT	Reid 5' (pen.), 46'; Bamba (yellow card) 50'	Report	Clyne (yellow card) 50'; Smith (yellow card) 75'	Stadium: Cardiff City Stadium; Attendance: 31,939; Referee: Jonathan Moss

9 February 2019 26	Liverpool	3–0	Bournemouth	Liverpool
15:00 GMT	Mané 24'; Wijnaldum 34'; Salah 48'; Matip (yellow card) 61'; Robertson (yellow card) 87'	Report	Rico (yellow card) 25'; Smith (yellow card) 38'	Stadium: Anfield; Attendance: 53,178; Referee: Anthony Taylor

23 February 2019 27	Bournemouth	1–1	Wolverhampton Wanderers	Bournemouth
15:00 GMT	Smith (yellow card) 1'; King 14' (pen.), (penalty missed) 85'; Lerma (yellow card) 70'; Gosling (yellow card) 90+4'; Boruc (yellow card) 90+5'	Report	Jota (yellow card) 21'; Dendoncker (yellow card) 42'; Bennett (yellow card) 57'; Jiménez (yellow card) 77', (goal) 83' (pen.); Neves (yellow card) 85'	Stadium: Vitality Stadium; Attendance: 10,671; Referee: Roger East

27 February 2019 28	Arsenal	5–1	Bournemouth	Holloway, London
19:45 GMT	Özil 4'; Mkhitaryan 27'; Sokratis (yellow card) 36'; Koscielny 47'; Aubameyang 59'; Torreira (yellow card) 69'; Lacazette 78'	Report	Mousset 30'; King (yellow card) 32'; Daniels (yellow card) 77'	Stadium: Emirates Stadium; Attendance: 59,618; Referee: Chris Kavanagh

2 March 2019 29	Bournemouth	0–1	Manchester City	Bournemouth
15:00 GMT	King (yellow card) 84'	Report	Mahrez 55'; Otamendi (yellow card) 65'; Walker (yellow card) 84'	Stadium: Vitality Stadium; Attendance: 10,699; Referee: Kevin Friend

9 March 2019 30	Huddersfield Town	0–2	Bournemouth	Huddersfield
15:00 GMT	Kachunga (yellow card) 38'; Stanković (yellow card) 56'; Mooy (yellow card) 90'	Report	Wilson 20'; Fraser 65' (yellow card) 87'	Stadium: John Smith's Stadium; Attendance: 22,304; Referee: Anthony Taylor

16 March 2019 31	Bournemouth	2–2	Newcastle United	Bournemouth
15:00 GMT	Lerma (yellow card) 19'; Ibe (yellow card) 45+4'; King 48' (pen.), 81'; Daniels (yellow card) 83'	Report	Pérez (yellow card) 9'; Rondón 45+5'; Hayden (yellow card) 75'; Ritchie 90+4'	Stadium: Vitality Stadium; Attendance: 10,625; Referee: Mike Dean

30 March 2019 32	Leicester City	2–0	Bournemouth	Leicester
15:00 GMT	Morgan 11'; Vardy 82'	Report	Gosling (yellow card) 71'; Brooks (yellow card) 81'	Stadium: King Power Stadium; Attendance: 31,530; Referee: Lee Mason

6 April 2019 33	Bournemouth	1–3	Burnley	Bournemouth
15:00 BST	Barnes 4' (o.g.); Clyne (yellow card) 29'; Smith (yellow card) 90+5'	Report	Wood 18'; Westwood 20'; Hendrick (yellow card) 32'; Barnes (yellow card) 35', (goal) 56'; Mee (yellow card) 78'	Stadium: Vitality Stadium; Attendance: 10,446; Referee: Martin Atkinson

13 April 2019 34	Brighton & Hove Albion	0–5	Bournemouth	Falmer
15:00 BST	Andone (yellow card) 50'; Knockaert (red card) 68'; Bissouma (yellow card) 78'	Report	Aké (yellow card) 22'; Gosling 33', (yellow card) 64'; Mepham (yellow card) 50'; Fraser 55'; Boruc (yellow card) 71'; Brooks 74'; Wilson 82'; Stanislas 90+2'	Stadium: Amex Stadium; Attendance: 30,460; Referee: Kevin Friend

20 April 2019 35	Bournemouth	0–1	Fulham	Bournemouth
15:00 BST	S. Cook (yellow card) 80'	Report	Mitrović 53' (pen.), (yellow card) 75'; Chambers (yellow card) 59'; Rico (yellow card) 90+1'	Stadium: Vitality Stadium; Attendance: 10,511; Referee: David Coote

27 April 2019 36	Southampton	3–3	Bournemouth	Southampton
15:00 BST	Long 12', (yellow card) 35'; Romeu (yellow card) 26'; Ward-Prowse 55'; Targett 67'	Report	Gosling 20', (yellow card) 45+2'; Wilson 32', 86'	Stadium: St Mary's Stadium; Attendance: 31,310; Referee: Graham Scott

4 May 2019 37	Bournemouth	1–0	Tottenham Hotspur	Bournemouth
12:30 BST	Aké 90+1'; Lerma (yellow card) 90+4'	Report	Dier (yellow card) 11'; Alderweireld (yellow card) 23'; Sissoko (yellow card) 40'; Son (red card) 43'; Foyth (red card) 48'; Wanyama (yellow card) 90+3'; Alli (yellow card) 90+3'	Stadium: Vitality Stadium; Attendance: 10,630; Referee: Craig Pawson

12 May 2019 38	Crystal Palace	5–3	Bournemouth	Selhurst
15:00 BST	Batshuayi 24', 32'; Simpson 37' (o.g.); Milivojević (yellow card) 63' van Aanholt 65'; McArthur (yellow card) 69'; Zaha (yellow card) 79'; Townsend 80'	Report	Lerma 45'; Ibe 56'; King 73'	Stadium: Selhurst Park; Attendance: 25,433; Referee: Roger East

=== FA Cup ===
The third round draw was made live on BBC by Ruud Gullit and Paul Ince from Stamford Bridge on 3 December 2018.

5 January 2019 Third round	Bournemouth	1–3	Brighton & Hove Albion	Boscombe
12:30 GMT	Pugh 55'; Surman (yellow card) 84'; S. Cook (yellow card) 90'	Report	Stephens (yellow card) 22'; Knockaert 31'; Bissouma 34'; Andone 64'	Stadium: Dean Court; Attendance: 10,522; Referee: Michael Oliver

=== EFL Cup ===
The second round draw was made from the Stadium of Light on 16 August. The third round draw was made on 30 August 2018 by David Seaman and Joleon Lescott. The fourth round draw was made live on Quest by Rachel Yankey and Rachel Riley on 29 September. The draw for the quarter-final was made live on Sky Sports by Jamie Redknapp and Jimmy Floyd Hasselbaink on 31 October.

28 August 2018 Second round	Bournemouth	3–0	Milton Keynes Dons	Boscombe
19:45 BST	Mousset 15'; Fraser 37'; Ibe 90+1'	Report	Lewington (yellow card) 57'	Stadium: Dean Court; Attendance: 9,747; Referee: James Linington

25 September 2018 Third round	Bournemouth	3–2	Blackburn Rovers	Boscombe
19:45 BST	Stanislas 14'; Ibe 58' (pen.); Wilson 90+4'	Report	Conway 64' (pen.); Armstrong 72' (pen.); Williams (red card) 90+4'	Stadium: Dean Court; Attendance: 9,715; Referee: Simon Hooper

30 October 2018 Fourth round	Bournemouth	2–1	Norwich City	Boscombe
19:45 BST	Stanislas 39'; S. Cook 72'	Report	Hernández 70'	Stadium: Dean Court; Attendance: 10,331; Referee: Lee Mason

19 December 2018 Quarter-final	Chelsea	1–0	Bournemouth	Fulham
19:45 GMT	Fàbregas (yellow card) 60'; Hazard 84'	Report	Stanislas (yellow card) 57'; Simpson (yellow card) 65'	Stadium: Stamford Bridge; Attendance: 40,432; Referee: Anthony Taylor

== Squad statistics ==
As of 12 May 2019

No.	Pos	Nat	Player	Total		Premier League		FA Cup		EFL Cup	
No.	Pos	Nat	Player	Apps	Goals	Apps	Goals	Apps	Goals	Apps	Goals
Goalkeepers
1	GK	(Poland) POL	Artur Boruc	17	0	12	0	1	0	4	0
27	GK	(Bosnia and Herzegovina) BIH	Asmir Begović	24	0	24	0	0	0	0	0
42	GK	(Republic of Ireland) IRL	Mark Travers	2	0	2	0	0	0	0	0
Defenders
2	DF	(England) ENG	Simon Francis	20	0	13+4	0	0	0	3	0
3	DF	(England) ENG	Steve Cook	35	2	31	1	1	0	2+1	1
5	DF	(Netherlands) NED	Nathan Aké	39	4	38	4	0	0	1	0
11	DF	(England) ENG	Charlie Daniels	24	1	17+4	1	0+1	0	2	0
15	DF	(England) ENG	Adam Smith	26	1	25	1	0	0	1	0
21	DF	(Spain) ESP	Diego Rico	16	0	5+7	0	1	0	3	0
23	DF	(England) ENG	Nathaniel Clyne	15	0	13+1	0	1	0	0	0
25	DF	(England) ENG	Jack Simpson	11	0	4+2	0	1	0	3+1	0
33	DF	(Wales) WAL	Chris Mepham	13	0	10+3	0	0	0	0	0
Midfielders
4	MF	(England) ENG	Dan Gosling	26	2	19+6	2	0	0	1	0
6	MF	(England) ENG	Andrew Surman	20	0	16+2	0	1	0	1	0
8	MF	(Colombia) COL	Jefferson Lerma	32	2	29+1	2	0	0	2	0
10	MF	(England) ENG	Jordon Ibe	24	3	9+10	1	1	0	4	2
16	MF	(England) ENG	Lewis Cook	15	0	8+5	0	0	0	2	0
19	MF	(England) ENG	Junior Stanislas	27	4	11+12	2	0+1	0	3	2
20	MF	(Wales) WAL	David Brooks	33	7	29+1	7	0+1	0	1+1	0
22	MF	(United States) USA	Emerson Hyndman	1	0	0+1	0	0	0	0	0
24	MF	(Scotland) SCO	Ryan Fraser	42	8	35+3	7	1	0	1+2	1
28	MF	(England) ENG	Kyle Taylor	0	0	0	0	0	0	0	0
Forwards
9	FW	(France) FRA	Lys Mousset	28	2	1+23	1	1	0	3	1
13	FW	(England) ENG	Callum Wilson	33	15	29+1	14	0	0	1+2	1
17	FW	(Norway) NOR	Joshua King	38	12	34+1	12	0	0	0+3	0
29	FW	(England) ENG	Dominic Solanke	10	0	2+8	0	0	0	0	0
44	FW	(England) ENG	Sam Surridge	2	0	0+2	0	0	0	0	0
Players who have made an appearance or had a squad number this season but have left the club
7	MF	(England) ENG	Marc Pugh	3	1	0	0	1	1	1+1	0
18	FW	(England) ENG	Jermain Defoe	8	0	0+4	0	0	0	3+1	0
26	DF	(England) ENG	Tyrone Mings	7	0	2+3	0	0	0	2	0
