= Luke Vickery =

Indonesian footballer (born 2005)

Personal information
- Full name: Luke Anthony Vickery
- Date of birth: 25 October 2005 (age 21)
- Place of birth: Kailua, Hawaii, U.S.
- Height: 1.83 m (6 ft 0 in)
- Position: Winger

Team information
- Current team: Macarthur
- Number: 8

Youth career
- –2024: Western United

Senior career*
Years	Team	Apps	(Gls)
2024–2025	Western United	15	(1)
2025–	Macarthur	27	(5)

International career^{‡}
2024	Australia U19	4	(1)
2026–	Indonesia	4	(1)
Medal record
Men's football
Representing Australia
ASEAN U-19 Boys' Championship
Third place	2024 Indonesia	Team
Representing Indonesia
FIFA ASEAN Cup
Winner	2026 Indonesia	Team
- * Club domestic league appearances and goals as of 31 October 2026 ‡ National team caps and goals as of 5 October 2026

Luke Anthony Vickery (born 25 October 2005) is a professional footballer who plays as a winger for A-League Men club Macarthur. Born in the United States and raised in Australia, he plays for the Indonesia national team.

== Club career ==
=== Western United ===
Vickery is a graduate of the Western United youth academy. He signed his first professional contract with Western United on 3 June 2024. He made his professional debut for Western United in a 2–0 victory against Newcastle United Jets on 16 February 2024. He scored his first goal for the club on 28 February 2025, netting the final goal in a 3–1 win over Central Coast Mariners.

=== Macarthur FC ===
On 26 September 2025, Vickery joined another A-League Men club, Macarthur FC, on a free transfer. On 27 November 2025, Vickery scored his first goal and a brace in the 2025–26 AFC Champions League Two match against Hong Kong club Tai Po in a 2–1 win. Vickery scored his first league goal for the club on 26 December 2025, netting the crucial final goal at stoppage time in a 5–4 win over Newcastle Jets. He would make 7 goals overall in his first season with the club.

On 5 June 2026, the club officially extended Vickery's contract on a one-year contract until the end of the 2027–28 A-League season.

== International career ==
In July 2024, Vickery was called up to the Australia U19 squad to compete in the 2024 ASEAN U-19 Boys Championship held in Indonesia.

In June 2026, Vickery joined the Indonesia national team training camp in Jakarta, Indonesia.

On 25 September 2026, Vickery was called up to the Indonesian national team squad to compete in the FIFA ASEAN Cup in Jakarta, Indonesia. In a match against Singapore, he contributed an assist to Ragnar Oratmangoen for the team's first goal, helping them secure a 2–0 win. On 1 October 2026, Vickery scored his first goal for Indonesia against Bangladesh in a 9–2 victory.

== Personal life ==
Vickery was born in the United States and raised in Australia. His maternal grandmother was born in Medan, North Sumatra, when it was called the Dutch East Indies. Vickery is therefore eligible to represent Indonesia at international level.

On 16 July 2026, Vickery officially obtained Indonesian citizenship.

== Career statistics ==
=== Club ===
As of 31 October 2026

Appearances and goals by club, season and competition
Club	Season	League			Australia Cup		Other		Total	
Club	Season	Division	Apps	Goals	Apps	Goals	Apps	Goals	Apps	Goals
Western United	2023–24	A-League	4	0	–		0	0	4	0
Western United	2024–25	A-League	11	1	1	0	0	0	12	1
Western United	Total		15	1	1	0	0	0	16	1
Macarthur	2025–26	A-League	24	5	1	0	6 (Note: Appearances in AFC Champions League Two)	2	31	7
Macarthur	2026–27	A-League	3	0	0	0	–		3	0
Macarthur	Total		27	5	0	0	6	2	34	7
Career total			42	6	2	0	6	2	50	8

=== International ===
As of match played 5 October 2026

Appearances and goals by national team and year
National team	Year	Apps	Goals
Indonesia	2026	4	1
Total		4	1

As of match played 1 October 2026
Scores and results list Indonesia's goal tally first, score column indicates score after each Vickery goal.

List of international goals scored by Luke Vickery
No.	Date	Venue	Opponent	Score	Result	Competition
1.	1 October 2026	Gelora Bung Karno Stadium, Jakarta, Indonesia	Bangladesh	7–1	9–2	2026 FIFA ASEAN Cup

== Honours ==
=== International ===
Indonesia

- FIFA ASEAN Cup: 2026

Australia U19

- ASEAN U-19 Boys Championship third place: 2024

== See also ==
- List of Indonesia international footballers born outside Indonesia
