= Ryan Fraser =

Scottish footballer (born 1994)

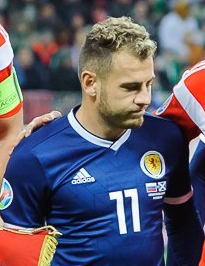
- Fraser with Scotland in 2019

Personal information
- Full name: Ryan Fraser
- Date of birth: 24 February 1994 (age 32)
- Place of birth: Aberdeen, Scotland
- Height: 5 ft 4 in (1.63 m)
- Position: Left winger

Team information
- Current team: Macarthur FC
- Number: 10

Youth career
- –2010: Aberdeen

Senior career*
Years	Team	Apps	(Gls)
2010–2013	Aberdeen	21	(0)
2013–2020	Bournemouth	183	(20)
2015–2016	→ Ipswich Town (loan)	18	(4)
2020–2024	Newcastle United	53	(2)
2023–2024	→ Southampton (loan)	39	(6)
2024–2026	Southampton	24	(0)
2026	Western Sydney Wanderers	12	(4)
2026–	Macarthur FC	4	(1)

International career^{‡}
2012–2013	Scotland U19	6	(1)
2013–2016	Scotland U21	10	(3)
2017–2022	Scotland	26	(4)
- * Club domestic league appearances and goals as of 06:02, 12 November 2026 (UTC) ‡ National team caps and goals as of 16 November 2022

Ryan Fraser (born 24 February 1994) is a Scottish professional footballer who plays as a left winger for A-League Men club Macarthur FC. He played for the Scotland national team until 2022.

He started his professional playing career for Aberdeen before joining Bournemouth in 2013. Fraser spent the 2015–16 season on loan at Ipswich Town. After leaving Bournemouth in 2020, he signed for Newcastle United. In 2023, Fraser joined Southampton on loan before joining the club permanently in 2024. In January 2026, he moved to Australian club Western Sydney Wanderers. In August 2026, he moved to Macarthur FC.

He represented the Scotland under-19 and under-21 team, and made his full international debut in June 2017.

== Club career ==
=== Aberdeen ===
Fraser signed for Aberdeen in May 2010, aged 16, after leaving Kincorth Academy. He made his debut for the first team against Heart of Midlothian in October 2010. Fraser made a significant impression in the Aberdeen first team during the early part of the 2012–13 Scottish Premier League season, winning the Young Player of the Month award for September and October 2012. Aberdeen manager Craig Brown expressed concerns at this time that opposing teams were targeting Fraser with tough tackling. Fraser rejected a contract extension with Aberdeen on 7 December 2012.

=== Bournemouth ===
Fraser signed a three-year contract with League One club Bournemouth on 18 January 2013. Bournemouth paid Aberdeen a transfer fee of £400,000 to complete the deal. During his first season, Fraser helped Bournemouth gain promotion to the Championship. After Bournemouth were promoted to the Premier League in 2015, Fraser was loaned to Championship club Ipswich Town for the 2015–16 season.

Fraser scored his first Premier League goal on 4 December 2016, in a 4–3 win against Liverpool. He entered the game as a second-half substitute, when Bournemouth trailed 2–0. Fraser won a penalty kick for the first Bournemouth goal, scored the second and provided an assist for the third goal.

Fraser scored both Bournemouth goals in a 2–1 win against Everton on 30 December 2017. He ranked highly in the assists chart during the 2018–19 Premier League season with 14 assists and 7 goals, leading to transfer speculation linking him with a move to Arsenal. No summer move materialised and Fraser admitted in January 2020 that this speculation had caused a decline in his performances during the 2019–20 season. With his contract due to expire on 30 June 2020, Fraser rejected the offer of a short-term extension to play the rest of Bournemouth's matches in the 2019–20 season, which was interrupted by the coronavirus pandemic, as he did not want to risk injury. Manager Eddie Howe later confirmed that Fraser would not play for the club again.

=== Newcastle United ===
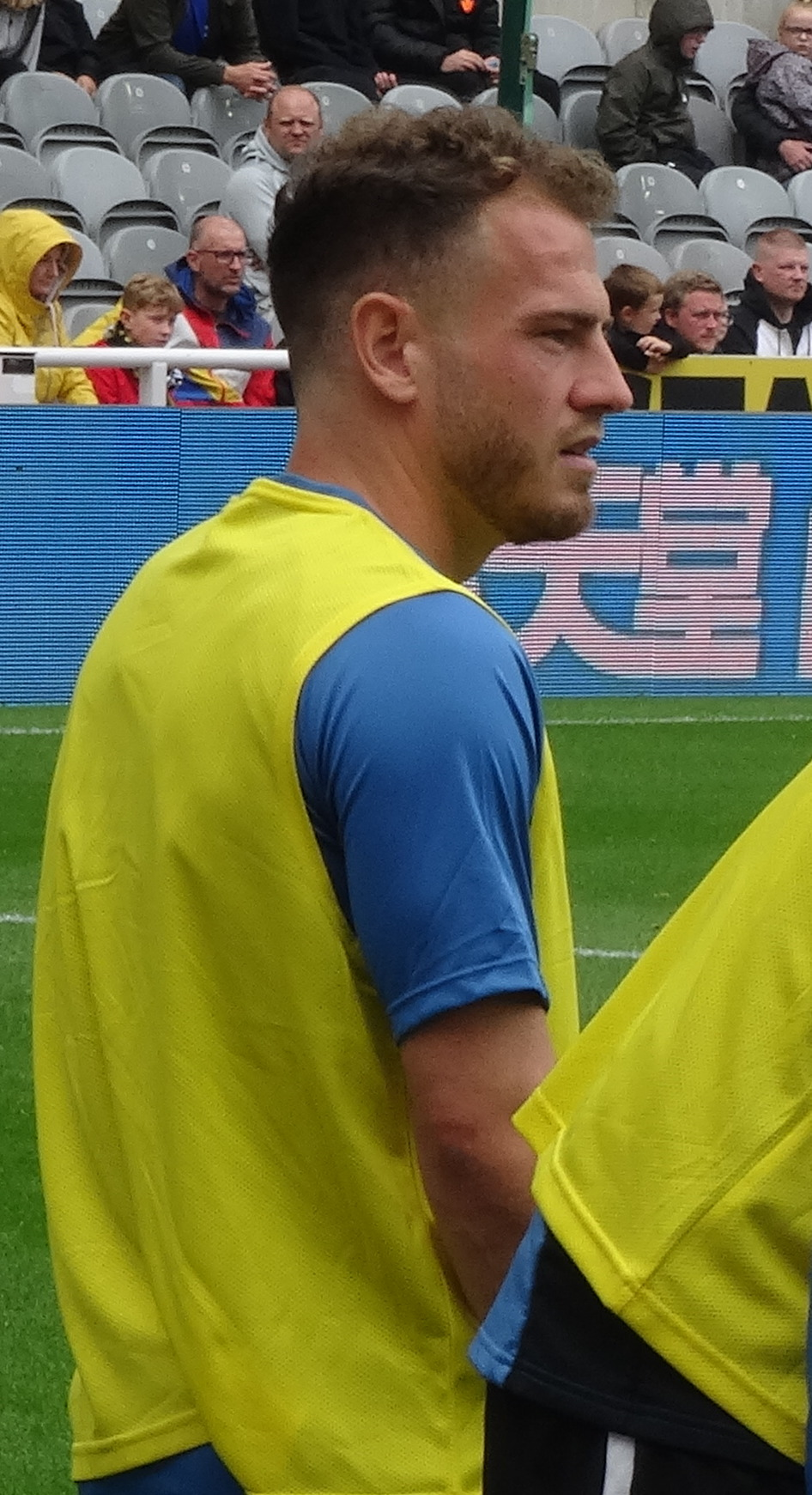
Fraser warming up for Newcastle United in 2021

On 7 September 2020, Fraser joined Newcastle United on a five-year contract. He made his debut for the club on 15 September 2020, scoring the winner in a 1–0 victory over Blackburn Rovers in the EFL Cup.

After Steve Bruce was sacked by the club, and replaced by Eddie Howe, Fraser garnered increased playing time in the second half of the 2021–22 season, helping Newcastle to avoid relegation with an 11th placed finish. His playing time was reduced during the 2022–23 season, with his last appearance coming on 19 October. By March 2023 he was training with the club's under-21 squad, with Howe saying that he had done this in order to concentrate on players who were "committed" to the club. He added that he felt Fraser had no future at Newcastle.

=== Southampton ===
On 25 August 2023, Fraser joined Southampton on a season-long loan. One day later, he made his debut for the club in a 2–1 victory against Queens Park Rangers, coming on as a substitute for Sam Amo-Ameyaw in the 56th minute. Fraser scored his first goal for the club on 21 October 2023 in a 2–1 victory against Hull City.

On 30 August 2024, Fraser joined Southampton permanently on a two-year contract. During a 3–2 defeat against Leicester City on 19 October 2024, he received a red card for a foul on Jamie Vardy after referee Anthony Taylor reviewed the pitchside monitor.

=== Western Sydney Wanderers ===
On 22 January 2026, Fraser joined Australian club Western Sydney Wanderers on a free transfer, signing a contract until the end of the 2025–26 A-League Men season. Three days later, on 25 January 2026, Fraser made his debut in a 1–0 win over Perth Glory, scoring the winning goal in stoppage time. On 18 April, Fraser played the full 90 minutes in a 2–1 loss to the Wellington Phoenix, confirming the Wanderers' last place finish. Two days later, it was reported that Fraser was close to agreeing terms with cross-city rivals Sydney FC.

=== Macarthur FC ===
On 31 August 2026, Fraser joined Macarthur FC.

== International career ==
Fraser was first called up to the senior Scotland squad in March 2017. He made his international debut in June 2017, appearing as a substitute in a 2–2 draw with England and winning a free kick which led to the first of Leigh Griffiths' two goals.

In March 2019, Fraser missed a UEFA Euro 2020 qualifying match against Kazakhstan due to the Kazakhs using an artificial playing surface. Scotland lost 3–0, and Fraser was criticised by former Scotland player Darren Fletcher for showing a lack of commitment to the national team. Fraser said he had previously suffered two serious injuries while playing on artificial surfaces, and that the decision not to play had been agreed with both the national team and his club side Bournemouth. In November 2019 he was one of three Scotland players to withdraw from the national squad due to injury.

Fraser scored the goal in a 1–0 win against the Czech Republic on 14 October 2020.

== Style of play ==
Primarily deployed as a winger on the left flank, Fraser is a right-footed player described by his compatriot Charlie Nicholas as an "old-fashioned type of player" and a "little pocket dynamo" for the muscular physique he has developed to "take the knocks and kicks that come his way." Fraser has occasionally played in the right-back position for both club and country. He had previously been utilised in a central midfield role for Newcastle, but has most recently been played by manager Eddie Howe as a winger on the right flank, in a 4-3-3 formation.

== Career statistics ==
=== Club ===
As of match played 8 November 2026

Appearances and goals by club, season and competition
Club	Season	League			National cup		League cup		Other		Total	
Club	Season	Division	Apps	Goals	Apps	Goals	Apps	Goals	Apps	Goals	Apps	Goals
Aberdeen	2010–11	Scottish Premier League	2	0	0	0	0	0	0	0	2	0
Aberdeen	2011–12	Scottish Premier League	3	0	0	0	0	0	0	0	3	0
Aberdeen	2012–13	Scottish Premier League	16	0	0	0	2	0	0	0	18	0
Aberdeen	Total		21	0	0	0	2	0	0	0	23	0
Bournemouth	2012–13	League One	5	0	0	0	0	0	0	0	5	0
Bournemouth	2013–14	Championship	37	3	2	1	2	0	0	0	41	4
Bournemouth	2014–15	Championship	21	1	2	1	4	0	0	0	27	2
Bournemouth	2015–16	Premier League	0	0	0	0	0	0	0	0	0	0
Bournemouth	2016–17	Premier League	28	3	0	0	1	0	0	0	29	3
Bournemouth	2017–18	Premier League	26	5	2	0	4	1	0	0	32	6
Bournemouth	2018–19	Premier League	38	7	1	0	3	1	0	0	42	8
Bournemouth	2019–20	Premier League	28	1	2	0	2	0	0	0	32	1
Bournemouth	Total		183	20	9	2	16	2	0	0	208	24
Ipswich Town (loan)	2015–16	Championship	18	4	1	1	2	1	0	0	21	6
Newcastle United	2020–21	Premier League	18	0	0	0	4	1	—		22	1
Newcastle United	2021–22	Premier League	27	2	1	0	1	0	—		29	2
Newcastle United	2022–23	Premier League	8	0	0	0	0	0	—		8	0
Newcastle United	Total		53	2	1	0	5	1	0	0	59	3
Southampton (loan)	2023–24	Championship	39	6	2	2	0	0	3 (Note: Appearances in Championship play-offs)	0	44	8
Southampton	2024–25	Premier League	8	0	0	0	2	0	—		10	0
Southampton	2025–26	Championship	16	0	0	0	2	1	—		18	1
Southampton	Total		24	0	0	0	4	1	—		28	1
Western Sydney Wanderers	2025–26	A-League	12	4	0	0	—		0	0	12	4
Macarthur FC	2026–27	A-League	4	1	0	0	—		0	0	4	1
Career total			354	37	13	5	29	5	3	0	399	47

=== International ===
As of match played 16 November 2022

Appearances and goals by national team and year
National team	Year	Apps	Goals
Scotland	2017	2	0
Scotland	2018	4	1
Scotland	2019	5	0
Scotland	2020	3	1
Scotland	2021	8	2
Scotland	2022	4	0
Total		26	4

Scores and results list Scotland's goal tally first, score column indicates score after each Fraser goal.

List of international goals scored by Ryan Fraser
No.	Date	Venue	Opponent	Score	Result	Competition
1	17 November 2018	Loro Boriçi Stadium, Shkodër, Albania	Albania	1–0	4–0	2018–19 UEFA Nations League C
2	14 October 2020	Hampden Park, Glasgow, Scotland	Czech Republic	1–0	1–0	2020–21 UEFA Nations League B
3	28 March 2021	Bloomfield Stadium, Tel Aviv, Israel	Israel	1–1	1–1	2022 FIFA World Cup qualification
4	31 March 2021	Hampden Park, Glasgow, Scotland	Faroe Islands	4–0	4–0	2022 FIFA World Cup qualification

== Honours ==
Bournemouth

- Football League Championship: 2014–15

Southampton

- EFL Championship play-offs: 2024

Individual

- Bournemouth Supporters' Player of the Year: 2018–19
- Bournemouth Players' Player of the Year: 2018–19
