= Harry Sawyer (soccer) =

Australian soccer player

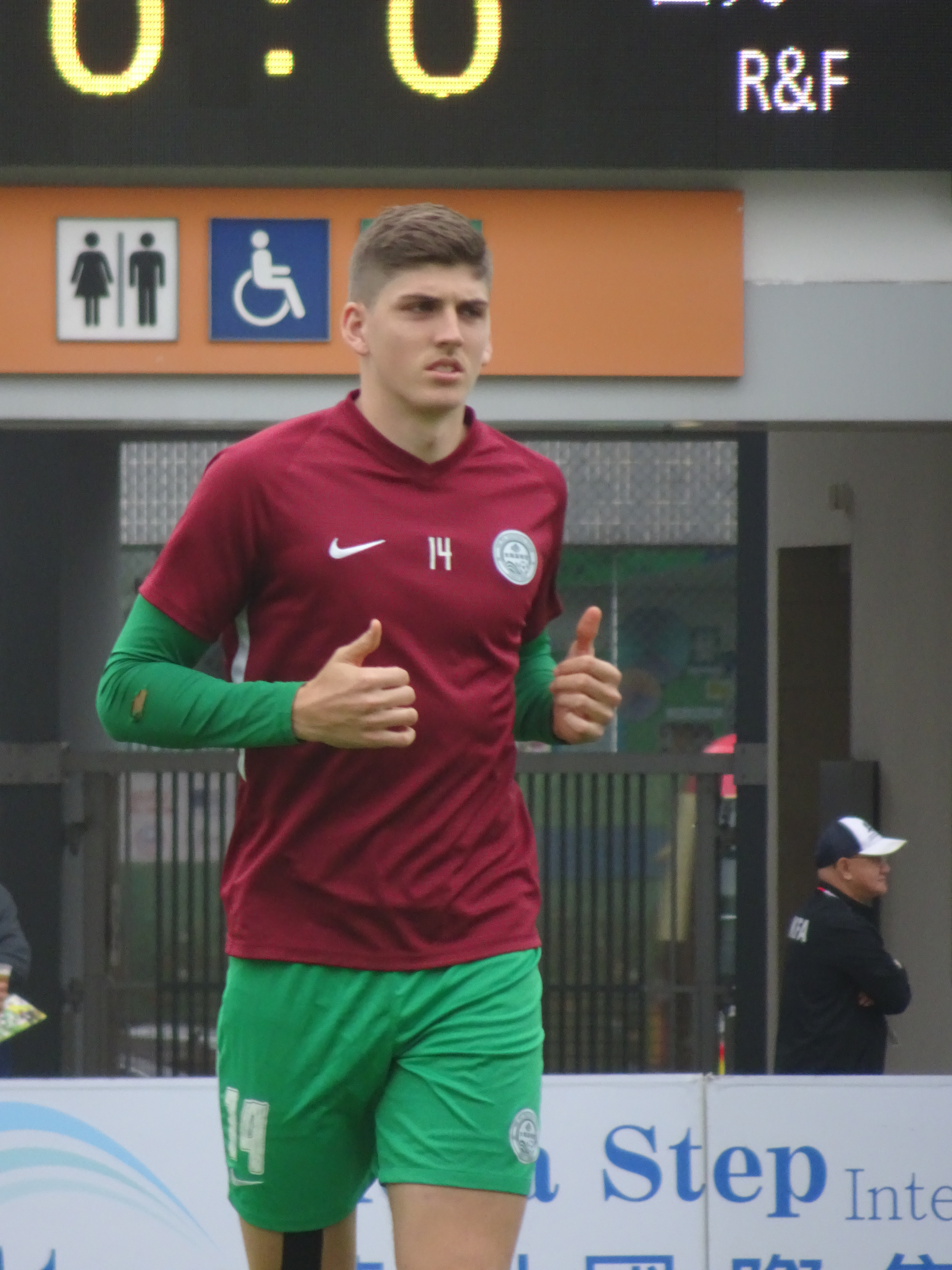
- Sawyer with Tai Po in 2018

Personal information
- Full name: Harrison Hickey Sawyer
- Date of birth: 31 December 1996 (age 29)
- Place of birth: Brisbane, Australia
- Height: 1.95 m (6 ft 5 in)
- Position: Forward

Team information
- Current team: Melbourne Victory
- Number: 9

Youth career
- 2015–2016: Brisbane Roar
- 2017: Newcastle Jets

Senior career*
Years	Team	Apps	(Gls)
2014	Peninsula Power	7	(2)
2015	Western Pride	21	(7)
2016	Brisbane Roar NPL	4	(2)
2017	Newcastle Jets	5	(0)
2017	Western Pride	7	(15)
2017–2019	Davao Aguilas	24	(13)
2018–2019	→ Tai Po (loan)	10	(4)
2020–2022	South Melbourne	41	(24)
2020	→ Gold Coast Knights (loan)	19	(15)
2022–2023	Jamshedpur	18	(2)
2023	VPS	12	(3)
2023–2024	South Melbourne	24	(16)
2024–2026	Macarthur FC	42	(10)
2026–	Melbourne Victory	0	(0)
- * Club domestic league appearances and goals as of 6 July 2026

Harrison Hickey "Harry" Sawyer (/ˈsɔɪ.ər/; born 31 December 1996) is an Australian professional footballer who plays as a striker and currently plays for Melbourne Victory.

== Early life ==
Sawyer was born on 31 December 1996. Born in Brisbane, Australia, he grew up in the city.

== Career ==
He rejoined Western Pride in 2017 after making his professional debut with the Newcastle Jets. While playing for Newcastle Jets, he became the first former Western Pride player to play in the A-League Men. Sawyer later joined the Davao Aguilas of the Philippines Football League within the same year. Although arriving halfway through the 2017 season, Sawyer was awarded with the club's golden boot, scoring 10 goals.

In July 2018, Sawyer was sent on loan to Hong Kong club Tai Po. Sawyer made an impressive start, scoring a hat trick on debut. His side went on to win the 2018–19 Hong Kong Premier League title, whilst competing in the AFC Cup. Sawyer finished the season with 10 goals across all competitions.

On 20 October 2019, it was announced that Sawyer would return to Australia, signing with NPL club South Melbourne. Sawyer went on to score 25 goals across 42 appearances for the club. His tenure at the club included a season-long loan to Gold Coast Knights in 2020, during the pandemic interrupted season. He Gold Coast Knights goal scoring charts, scoring 15 goals in 19 appearances. Upon returning to South Melbourne, Sawyer's first full-season with the club ultimately ended in success, with his side winning the 2022 National Premier League Premiership. Sawyer finished the season as the competitions leading goal scorer, with 17 goals.

On 10 August 2022, it was announced Sawyer had signed for Indian Super League side Jamshedpur FC.

On 10 July 2023, Sawyer signed for the Finnish Veikkausliiga side VPS.

On 1 January 2024, Harry Sawyer returned to South Melbourne as new club captain ahead of the 2024 NPL Victoria Season. Sawyer debuted in the NPL for South Melbourne on 8 February 2024 in a game against Melbourne Knights and scored the winner in his debut. In the Dockerty Cup Sawyer notable scored a 27-yard free kick against fierce South Melbourne rivals Preston Lions in the quarterfinals, South Melbourne would go on to win the tournament. In the Australia Cup Sawyer scored South Melbournes only goal of the match in their 1-0 triumph over Wellington Phoenix to advance to the round of 16.

On 16 September 2024 it was announced that Sawyer signed for Macarthur FC. He played in the AFC Champions League Two while playing for the club.

On 6 July 2026, it was announced that Sawyer signed for Melbourne Victory.

== Style of play ==
Sawyer plays as a forward. He is known for his height.

== Honours ==
=== Club ===
Tai Po

- Hong Kong Premier League: 2018–19

South Melbourne

- National Premier Leagues Victoria: 2022
- Dockerty Cup: 2024
- National Premier Leagues Victoria: 2024

=== Individual ===
- National Premier Leagues Victoria Golden Boot: 2022
- National Premier Leagues Victoria Golden Boot: 2024
