= Rafael Durán (footballer) =

Mexican footballer (born 1997)

- Durán playing for Wellington Phoenix in 2026.

Personal information
- Full name: Rafael Durán Martínez
- Date of birth: 20 August 1997 (age 29)
- Place of birth: Guadalajara, Jalisco, México
- Height: 1.84 m (6 ft 0 in)
- Position: Forward

Team information
- Current team: Wellington Phoenix
- Number: 9

Senior career*
Years	Team	Apps	(Gls)
2018–2021	Tigres UANL	5	(1)
2019	→ Lobos BUAP (loan)	6	(0)
2019–2020	→ UdeG (loan)	10	(1)
2020–2021	→ Venados (loan)	27	(5)
2021	Zacatecas	16	(3)
2022–2023	UNAM	0	(0)
2022–2023	→ Pumas Tabasco (loan)	42	(10)
2023–2024	Atlante	36	(12)
2024–2025	Puebla	8	(1)
2025	→ Atlante (loan)	11	(4)
2025–2026	Macarthur	19	(4)
2026–	Wellington Phoenix	2	(1)
- * Club domestic league appearances and goals as of 18 October 2026

Rafael Durán Martínez (Latin American Spanish: [rafaˈel duˈɾan maɾˈtines]; born 20 August 1997) is a Mexican professional footballer who plays as a forward for Wellington Phoenix in the A-League Men.

== Club career ==
=== Tigres UANL ===
Durán would make his professional debut during an Apertura 2017 Copa MX group stage match against Cruz Azul, coming in as a substitute at the 61st minute. The game tied 1–1. He would score his first goal with Tigres on 21 October 2018 in a league match against Club Universidad Nacional, scoring turning the score in favor of Tigres 2–1 but eventually tying 3–3.

=== Wellington Phoenix ===
On 18 August 2026, Wellington Phoenix of the A-League Men signed Durán on a two-year contract. Durán made his debut for the club on 18 October, two months after joining, but was substituted in the 28th minute due to an ankle injury in a 2–1 win over Melbourne Victory.

== Honours ==
Tigres UANL

- Campeones Cup: 2018
