= Alexander Robinson (soccer) =

Australian soccer player (born 2005)

Personal information
- Date of birth: 9 March 2005 (age 21)
- Place of birth: Penrith, New South Wales, Australia
- Height: 1.87 m (6 ft 2 in)
- Position: Goalkeeper

Team information
- Current team: Macarthur FC
- Number: 1

Youth career
- 2018–2020: Western City Rangers
- 2020–2022: Blacktown City
- 2022–2025: Macarthur FC

Senior career*
Years	Team	Apps	(Gls)
2020–2022	Blacktown City	23	(0)
2022–2025	Bulls FC Academy	25	(0)
2022–	Macarthur FC	10	(0)

International career^{‡}
2023–2025	Australia U20	6	(0)
2025–	Australia U23	1	(0)
- * Club domestic league appearances and goals as of 17 October 2026 ‡ National team caps and goals as of 6 October 2026

Alexander Robinson (born 9 March 2005) is an Australian professional soccer player who plays as a goalkeeper for A-League Men club Macarthur FC.

== Early life ==
Robinson was born on 9 March 2005 in Penrith, a suburb of Western Sydney, New South Wales. He is of English descent.

== Club career ==
=== Macarthur FC ===
Robinson joined Macarthur FC for the 2022–23 season, also playing in the Bulls FC Academy, where he kept over 11 clean sheets. His contract was extended until the end of the 2028–29 season in June 2026.

== International career ==
=== Youth ===
Robinson was a part of the 23-man squad for the 2025 AFC U-20 Asian Cup, which Australia ultimately won. He was also a part of the squad for the 2025 FIFA U-20 World Cup.
