= 2020–21 Brisbane Roar FC season =

Brisbane Roar
2020–21 season
- Chairman: Rahim Soekasah
- Manager: Warren Moon
- Stadium: Dolphin Stadium
- A-League: 4th
- A-League Finals: Elimination-finals
- FFA Cup: Cancelled
- Top goalscorer: League: Riku Danzaki (9); All: Riku Danzaki (9)
- Highest home attendance: 9,279 (19 December 2020 vs. Melbourne City
- Lowest home attendance: 2,064 (12 May 2021 vs. Central Coast Mariners
- Average home league attendance: 6,058

The 2020–21 Brisbane Roar FC season is the club's 16th season. The club will participate in the A-League for the 16th time. The club will not compete in the 2020 FFA Cup due to the event being cancelled following the COVID-19 pandemic in Australia. The club was scheduled to play in the 2021 AFC Champions League qualifying play-offs in June 2021, but withdrew from the competition on 4 June 2021.

== Players ==
Note: Flags indicate national team as defined under FIFA eligibility rules; some limited exceptions apply. Players may hold more than one non-FIFA nationality.

No.	Pos.	Nation	Player
1	GK	AUS	Macklin Freke
2	DF	AUS	Scott Neville
3	DF	AUS	Corey Brown
5	DF	SCO	Tom Aldred (captain)
6	DF	ENG	Macaulay Gillesphey
9	FW	JPN	Masato Kudo
10	MF	JPN	Riku Danzaki (on loan from Consadole Sapporo)
11	FW	AUS	Joe Champness (on loan from Newcastle Jets)
15	MF	AUS	Jesse Daley
16	DF	AUS	Josh Brindell-South
17	FW	AUS	Golgol Mebrahtu

No.	Pos.	Nation	Player
19	DF	AUS	Jack Hingert
21	GK	ENG	Jamie Young
22	DF	AUS	Antonee Burke-Gilroy (injury replacement)
23	FW	AUS	Dylan Wenzel-Halls
25	MF	AUS	Rahmat Akbari
26	MF	IRL	Jay O'Shea
27	DF	AUS	Kai Trewin (scholarship)
28	DF	AUS	Izaack Powell (scholarship)
29	DF	AUS	Jordan Courtney-Perkins
34	FW	AUS	Alex Parsons
37	FW	AUS	Cyrus Dehmie (scholarship)

== Transfers ==
=== Transfers in ===
No.	Position	Name	From	Type/fee	Contract length	Date	Ref
15	MF	Jesse Daley	Unattached	Free transfer		12 October 2020	
16	DF	Josh Brindell-South	(Australia) Lions FC	Free transfer	1 year	13 October 2020	
11	FW	Joe Champness	Newcastle Jets	Loan	1 year	30 October 2020	
8	MF	Danny Kim	(Australia) Lions FC	Free transfer		10 November 2020	
10	MF	(Japan) Riku Danzaki	(Japan) Consadole Sapporo	Loan	1 year	19 November 2020	
9	FW	(Japan) Masato Kudo	Unattached	Free transfer		10 December 2020	
12	GK	Bon Scott	(Australia) Brisbane City	Injury replacement	1 month	19 January 2021	
17	FW	Golgol Mebrahtu	Unattached	Free transfer	6 months	22 January 2021	
2	DF	Scott Neville	(India) East Bengal	End of loan		27 March 2021	
22	DF	Patrick Flottmann	Sydney FC	Injury replacement loan	2 weeks	28 April 2021	
22	DF	Antonee Burke-Gilroy	(Australia) Altona Magic	Injury replacement	1 month	11 May 2021	

=== Transfers out ===
No.	Position	Player	Transferred to	Type/fee	Date	Ref
4	DF	Daniel Bowles	Retired		24 August 2020	
22	DF	Jake McGing	Unattached	End of contract	7 September 2020	
15	DF	Aaron Reardon	Unattached	End of contract	7 September 2020	
12	MF	(New Zealand) Matthew Ridenton	Unattached	End of contract	7 September 2020	
8	MF	Danny Kim	(Australia) Lions FC	End of loan	7 September 2020	
10	MF	Brad Inman	(India) ATK Mohun Bagan	Undisclosed	21 September 2020	
1	GK	(New Zealand) Max Crocombe	Melbourne Victory	Mutual contract termination	1 October 2020	
20	FW	(Wales) Aaron Amadi-Holloway	Unattached	End of contract	9 October 2020	
2	DF	Scott Neville	(India) East Bengal	Loan	13 October 2020	
30	FW	Mirza Muratovic	Unattached	Mutual contract termination	9 November 2020	
12	GK	Bon Scott	(Australia) Avondale	End of contract	15 February 2021	
14	MF	George Mells	Unattached	Mutual contract termination	23 February 2021	
7	MF	(New Zealand) Jai Ingham	(Philippines) United City	Mutual contract termination	24 March 2021	
77	FW	Scott McDonald	Unattached	Mutual contract termination	24 April 2021	
22	DF	Patrick Flottmann	Sydney FC	End of loan	10 May 2021	
8	MF	Danny Kim	Unattached	Mutual contract termination	27 May 2021	

=== From youth squad ===
N	Pos.	Nat.	Name	Age	Notes
34	FW	(Australia)	Alex Parsons	21	senior contract
37	FW	(Australia)	Cyrus Dehmie	19	scholarship contract

=== Contract extensions ===
No.	Name	Position	Duration	Date	Notes
2	Scott Neville	Right-back	2+ years	13 October 2020	
3	Corey Brown	Left-back	2+ years	14 October 2020	
5	(Scotland) Tom Aldred	Centre-back	3 years	4 February 2021	
26	(Republic of Ireland) Jay O'Shea	Midfielder	3 years	4 February 2021	
25	Rahmat Akbari	Midfielder	1+ years	11 March 2021	
16	Josh Brindell-South	Left-back	2+ years	28 May 2021	

== Pre-season and friendlies ==
7 November 2020	Eastern Suburbs (Australia)	0–1	(Australia) Brisbane Roar	Brisbane, Australia
17:30 AEST		Report	O'Shea	Stadium: Heath Park

14 November 2020	Magpies Crusaders United (Australia)	1–9	(Australia) Brisbane Roar	Mackay, Australia
18:30 AEST	? (?)	Report	McDonald (?); Wenzel-Halls (?); Jelacic (?)	Stadium: Soliginkin Oval

21 November 2020	Rochedale Rovers (Australia)	1–6	(Australia) Brisbane Roar	Brisbane, Australia
17:30 AEST	? 87'	Report	Wenzel-Halls 33'; Ingham 35'; Trewin 69'; Parsons 76'; Brindell-South (?); Brymora 90'	Stadium: Underwood Park

29 November 2020 Dolphin Community Shield	Peninsula Power (Australia)	1–7	(Australia) Brisbane Roar	Redcliffe, Australia
17:00 AEST	McHenery 17'	Report	McDonald 7', 9'; Brindell-South 23'; Jelacic 29'; Wenzel-Halls 65'; Brown 77'; O'Shea 88' (pen.)	Stadium: A.J. Kelly Park

5 December 2020	NPL Queensland All-Stars (Australia)	2–5	(Australia) Brisbane Roar	Kippa-Ring, Australia
19:00 AEST	McHenery 50'; Gillesphey 55' (o.g.)	Report	Champness 17', 26', 33'; McDonald 21', 39'	Stadium: Dolphin Stadium

12 December 2020	Newcastle Jets (Australia)	1–1	(Australia) Brisbane Roar	Coffs Harbour, Australia
	Topor-Stanley 24'	Report	Parsons 16'	Stadium: C.ex Coffs International Stadium

20 December 2020	Brisbane Roar (Australia)	0–2	(Australia) Western United	Gold Coast, Australia
		Report	Calver 73'; Majok 85'	Stadium: Gold Coast Sports and Leisure Centre

== Competitions ==
Win Draw Loss

=== Overview ===
Competition	First match	Last match	Starting round	Final position	Record							
Competition	First match	Last match	Starting round	Final position	Pld	W	D	L	GF	GA	GD	Win %
A-League	29 December 2020	5 June 2021	Matchday 1	4th	26	11	7	8	36	28	+8	42.31
A-League Finals	13 June 2021		Elimination-finals	Elimination-finals	1	0	0	1	1	2	−1	0.00
Total					27	11	7	9	37	30	+7	40.74

Source: Soccerway

=== A-League ===
==== League table ====
Pos	Team	Pld	W	D	L	GF	GA	GD	Pts	Qualification
2	Sydney FC	26	13	8	5	39	23	+16	47	Qualification for 2022 AFC Champions League qualifying play-offs and finals series (Note: The top two teams entered the finals series at the semi-finals, while the teams ranked third to sixth entered the finals series at the elimination-finals.)
3	Central Coast Mariners	26	12	6	8	35	31	+4	42	Qualification for finals series
4	Brisbane Roar	26	11	7	8	36	28	+8	40	Qualification for finals series
5	Adelaide United	26	11	6	9	39	41	−2	39	Qualification for finals series
6	Macarthur FC	26	11	6	9	33	36	−3	39	Qualification for finals series

Source: A-Leagues
Rules for classification: 1) Points; 2) Goal difference; 3) Goals scored; 4) Least red cards; 5) Least yellow cards; 6) Toss of a coin in an event of a tie of two clubs.

==== Results summary ====
Overall								Home						Away					
Pld	W	D	L	GF	GA	GD	Pts	W	D	L	GF	GA	GD	W	D	L	GF	GA	GD
26	11	7	8	36	28	+8	40	5	5	3	17	12	+5	6	2	5	19	16	+3

Last updated: 2 January 2021.
Source: Ultimate A-League

==== Results by round ====
Round	1	2	3	4	5	6	7	8	9	10	11	12	13	14	15	16	17	18	19	20	21	22	23	24	25	26
Ground	H	A	H	H	A	H	H	A	A	H	A	H	A	H	A	A	H	H	H	A	H	A	A	H	A	A
Result	D	W	D	D	L	L	L	W	D	W	L	W	D	D	W	W	W	D	W	W	W	L	L	L	L	W
Position	10	3	4	3	5	2	2	3	2	3	7		7													

Updated to match(es) played on 26 February 2021. Source: Ultimate A-League
A = Away; H = Home; D = Draw; L = Loss

==== Matches ====
29 December 2020 7	Brisbane Roar	0–1	Melbourne City	Kippa-Ring
18:00 AEST		Report	Metcalfe 52'	Stadium: Dolphin Stadium; Attendance: 9,279; Referee: Adam Kersey

2 January 2021 2	Melbourne Victory	1–3	Brisbane Roar	Melbourne
19:10 AEDT	McManaman 24'	Report	McDonald 16'; Gillesphey 60'; Wenzel-Halls 79'	Stadium: AAMI Park; Attendance: 10,304; Referee: Shaun Evans

20 January 2021 8	Newcastle Jets	1–2	Brisbane Roar	Newcastle
19:05 AEDT	Yuel 38'	Report	Danzaki 6'; Wenzel-Halls 61'	Stadium: McDonald Jones Stadium; Attendance: 3,703; Referee: Daniel Elder

30 January 2021 10	Brisbane Roar	3–1	Adelaide United	Kippa-Ring
20:15 AEST	Wenzel-Halls 37', 78'; O'Shea 45'	Report	Konstandopoulos 82'	Stadium: Dolphin Stadium; Attendance: 8,747; Referee: Alireza Faghani

6 February 2021 17	Brisbane Roar	5–2	Melbourne Victory	Kippa-Ring
17:05 AEST	Wenzel-Halls 9'; McDonald 14', 35'; Danzaki 17', 49'	Report	Aldred 19' (o.g.); Brimmer 45'	Stadium: Dolphin Stadium; Attendance: 8,847; Referee: Daniel Elder

9 February 2021 6	Brisbane Roar	0–2	Macarthur FC	Kippa-Ring
18:35 AEST		Report	Genreau 76'; Derbyshire 90'	Stadium: Dolphin Stadium; Attendance: 4,693; Referee: Kurt Ams

14 February 2021 18	Brisbane Roar	0–0	Newcastle Jets	Kippa-Ring
17:00 AEST		Report		Stadium: Dolphin Stadium; Attendance: 7,319; Referee: Ben Abraham

20 February 2021 9	Sydney FC	0–0	Brisbane Roar	Kogarah
19:10 AEDT		Report		Stadium: Netstrata Jubliee Oval; Attendance: 5,667; Referee: Chris Beath

26 February 2021 5	Perth Glory	3–1	Brisbane Roar	Perth
18:20 AWST	Castro 40', 75'; Fornaroli 68'	Report	Hingert 45'	Stadium: HBF Park; Attendance: 5,432; Referee: Alireza Faghani

6 March 2021 3	Brisbane Roar	1–1	Sydney FC	Kippa-Ring
16:05 AEST	Wenzel-Halls 18'	Report	Bobô 71'	Stadium: Dolphin Stadium; Attendance: 8,562; Referee: Shaun Evans

14 March 2021 11	Western United	1–0	Brisbane Roar	Melbourne
17:10 AEST	Pierias 72'	Report		Stadium: AAMI Park; Attendance: 1,920; Referee: Alireza Faghani

21 March 2021 13	Wellington Phoenix	1–1	Brisbane Roar	Newcastle
16:00 AEDT	Hemed 42'	Report	Mebrahtu 86'	Stadium: McDonald Jones Stadium; Attendance: 1,432; Referee: Stephen Lucas

3 April 2021 14	Brisbane Roar	1–1	Western Sydney Wanderers	Kippa-Ring
16:00 AEST	Danzaki 49'	Report	Yeboah 12'	Stadium: Moreton Daily Stadium; Attendance: 4,952; Referee: Alex King

9 April 2021 15	Macarthur FC	1–2	Brisbane Roar	Campbelltown
19:05 AEST	Rose 90'	Report	Wenzel-Halls 12'; Danzaki 58'	Stadium: Campbelltown Stadium; Attendance: 2,786; Referee: Alireza Faghani

16 April 2021 16	Western Sydney Wanderers	1–2	Brisbane Roar	Sydney
19:00 AEDT	Kamau 23'	Report	Brindell-South 18'; Danzaki 45+2'	Stadium: Bankwest Stadium; Attendance: 8,251; Referee: Alex King

28 April 2021 20	Central Coast Mariners	0–4	Brisbane Roar	Gosford
19:05 AEST		Report	Gillesphey 19'; Champness 56'; Parsons 89'; Kudo 90+3'	Stadium: Central Coast Stadium; Attendance: 4,460; Referee: Alex King

1 May 2021 1	Brisbane Roar	0–0	Wellington Phoenix	Kippa-Ring
17:05 AEDT		Report		Stadium: Dolphin Stadium; Attendance: 5,897; Referee: Tim Danaskos

5 May 2021 12	Brisbane Roar	2–1	Western United	Kippa-Ring
19:05 AEST	Brindell-South 72'; Danzaki 90+4'	Report	Wales 60'	Stadium: Dolphin Stadium; Attendance: 2,183; Referee: Adam Kersey

9 May 2021 22	Melbourne City	3–2	Brisbane Roar	Melbourne
16:05 AEST	Metcalfe 14'; Trewin 17' (o.g.); Galloway 73'	Report	Champness 28'; Gillesphey 38'	Stadium: Melbourne; Attendance: 4,530; Referee: Shaun Evans

12 May 2021 4	Brisbane Roar	0–0	Central Coast Mariners	Kippa-Ring
19:05 AEST		Report		Stadium: Dolphin Stadium; Attendance: 2,064; Referee: Chris Beath

16 May 2021 23	Adelaide United	1–0	Brisbane Roar	Adelaide
18:10 ACDT	Goodwin 23'	Report		Stadium: Coopers Stadium; Attendance: 6,723; Referee: Ben Abraham

21 May 2021 26	Newcastle Jets	1–2	Brisbane Roar	Newcastle
19:05 AEDT	O'Shea 61' (o.g.)	Report	Danzaki 34'; O'Shea 73'	Stadium: McDonald Jones Stadium; Attendance: 2,642; Referee: Adam Kersey

25 May 2021 21	Brisbane Roar	3–0	Melbourne City	Kippa-Ring
19:05 AEST	O'Shea 6' (pen.), 52' (pen.); Parsons 38'	Report		Stadium: Dolphin Stadium; Attendance: 3,985; Referee: Alex King

30 May 2021 25	Western Sydney Wanderers	2–0	Brisbane Roar	Sydney
16:05 AEDT	Ibini 28'; Kamau 88'	Report		Stadium: Bankwest Stadium; Attendance: 6,531; Referee: Alireza Faghani

2 June 2021 19	Brisbane Roar	2–1	Perth Glory	Kippa-Ring
19:05 AEST	Aspropotamitis 51' (o.g.); Danzaki 73'	Report	Wilson 85'	Stadium: Dolphin Stadium; Attendance: 3,879; Referee: Chris Beath

5 June 2021 24	Brisbane Roar	0–2	Sydney FC	Kippa-Ring
15:05 AEST		Report	Barbarouses 16'; Van Der Saag 90+5'	Stadium: Dolphin Stadium; Attendance: 8,351; Referee: Alireza Faghani

==== Finals series ====
13 June 2021 Elimination-final	Brisbane Roar	1–2	Adelaide United	Kippa-Ring
15:05 AEST	Parsons 56'	Report	Juric 15', 19'	Stadium: Dolphin Stadium; Attendance: 7,782; Referee: Alex King

=== AFC Champions League ===
All three teams from Australia competing in the 2021 AFC Champions League (Sydney FC, Melbourne City and Brisbane Roar) withdrew from the competition after the draw.

== Statistics ==
=== Appearances and goals ===
Includes all competitions. Players with no appearances not included in the list.

No.	Pos	Nat	Player	Total		A-League		A-League Finals	
No.	Pos	Nat	Player	Apps	Goals	Apps	Goals	Apps	Goals
1	GK	(Australia) AUS	Macklin Freke	2	0	2	0	0	0
2	DF	(Australia) AUS	Scott Neville	15	0	13+1	0	1	0
3	DF	(Australia) AUS	Corey Brown	26	0	25	0	1	0
5	DF	(Scotland) SCO	Tom Aldred	17	0	16	0	1	0
6	DF	(England) ENG	Macaulay Gillesphey	23	3	22	3	1	0
9	FW	(Japan) JPN	Masato Kudo	14	1	3+11	1	0	0
10	MF	(Japan) JPN	Riku Danzaki	26	9	23+2	9	1	0
11	FW	(New Zealand) NZL	Joe Champness	24	2	15+8	2	1	0
15	MF	(Australia) AUS	Jesse Daley	24	0	9+15	0	0	0
16	DF	(Australia) AUS	Josh Brindell-South	17	2	13+3	2	1	0
17	FW	(Australia) AUS	Golgol Mebrahtu	12	1	3+8	1	0+1	0
19	FW	(Australia) AUS	Jack Hingert	17	1	13+3	1	0+1	0
21	FW	(England) ENG	Jamie Young	25	0	24	0	1	0
22	DF	(Australia) AUS	Antonee Burke-Gilroy	2	0	0+2	0	0	0
23	FW	(Australia) AUS	Dylan Wenzel-Halls	26	7	21+4	7	1	0
25	MF	(Australia) AUS	Rahmat Akbari	28	0	23+4	0	1	0
26	MF	(Republic of Ireland) IRL	Jay O'Shea	27	4	25+1	4	1	0
27	DF	(Australia) AUS	Kai Trewin	25	0	20+4	0	0+1	0
29	DF	(Australia) AUS	Jordan Courtney-Perkins	8	0	4+4	0	0	0
33	MF	(New Zealand) NZL	Keegan Jelacic	2	0	0+2	0	0	0
34	FW	(Australia) AUS	Alex Parsons	16	3	5+10	2	0+1	1
35	DF	(Australia) AUS	Hassan Ramazani	1	0	0+1	0	0	0
36	FW	(Australia) AUS	Eli Adams	1	0	0+1	0	0	0
37	FW	(Australia) AUS	Cyrus Dehmie	6	0	1+5	0	0	0
Player(s) transferred out but featured this season
7	FW	(New Zealand) NZL	Jai Ingham	3	0	1+2	0	0	0
8	DF	(Australia) AUS	Danny Kim	3	0	0+3	0	0	0
22	DF	(Australia) AUS	Patrick Flottmann	4	0	0+4	0	0	0
77	FW	(Australia) AUS	Scott McDonald	9	3	7+2	3	0	0

- Source: Soccerway

=== Disciplinary record ===
Includes all competitions. The list is sorted by squad number when total cards are equal. Players with no cards not included in the list.

No.	Pos	Nat	Player	Total			A-League			A-League Finals		
No.	Pos	Nat	Player	Yellow card	Second yellow card	Red card	Yellow card	Second yellow card	Red card	Yellow card	Second yellow card	Red card
6	DF	(England) ENG	Macaulay Gillesphey	6	1	0	6	1	0	0	0	0
15	MF	(Australia) AUS	Jesse Daley	6	0	0	6	0	0	0	0	0
3	DF	(Australia) AUS	Corey Brown	5	0	0	5	0	0	0	0	0
26	MF	(Republic of Ireland) IRL	Jay O'Shea	5	0	0	5	0	0	0	0	0
2	DF	(Australia) AUS	Scott Neville	4	0	0	4	0	0	0	0	0
25	MF	(Australia) AUS	Rahmat Akbari	4	0	0	4	0	0	0	0	0
5	DF	(Scotland) SCO	Tom Aldred	3	0	0	2	0	0	1	0	0
27	DF	(Australia) AUS	Kai Trewin	3	0	0	3	0	0	0	0	0
16	DF	(Australia) AUS	Josh Brindell-South	2	0	0	2	0	0	0	0	0
19	FW	(Australia) AUS	Jack Hingert	1	0	0	1	0	0	0	0	0
23	FW	(Australia) AUS	Dylan Wenzel-Halls	1	0	0	1	0	0	0	0	0

- Source: Soccerway
- (yellow card) = Number of bookings; (second yellow card) = Number of sending offs after a second yellow card; (red card) = Number of sending offs by a direct red card.
