= 2020–21 Melbourne City FC season =

Melbourne City
2020–21 season
- Owner: City Football Group
- Chairman: Khaldoon Al Mubarak
- Manager: Patrick Kisnorbo
- Stadium: AAMI Park
- A-League: 1st
- A-League Finals: Winners
- FFA Cup: Cancelled
- AFC Champions League: Withdrew
- Top goalscorer: Jamie Maclaren (25)
- Highest home attendance: 14,031 vs. Melbourne Victory (17 April 2021); A-League
- Lowest home attendance: 3,370 vs. Adelaide United (13 May 2021); A-League
- Average home league attendance: 6,154
- Biggest win: 7–0 vs. Melbourne Victory (H) (17 April 2021); A-League
- Biggest defeat: 0–3 vs. Brisbane Roar (A) (25 May 2021); A-League
Home colours	Away colours	Third colours

The 2020–21 season was the eleventh in the history of Melbourne City Football Club. The club competed in the A-League for the eleventh time. The club was scheduled to play in the 2021 AFC Champions League qualifying play-offs in June 2021, but withdrew from the competition on 4 June 2021.

== Review ==
=== Background ===
On 26 June 2019, Melbourne City appointed Frenchman Erick Mombaerts as new head coach leading the club in being runners-up in the 2019–20 A-League regular season, 2020 A-League Grand Final and 2019 FFA Cup.

=== Pre-season ===
The 2020 FFA Cup was cancelled on 3 July 2020.

Nathaniel Atkinson had departed the club for Perth Glory on 1 September 2020. Two days later, the club appointed former assistant coach Patrick Kisnorbo to the head manager position prior to the start of the season on 3 September, after previous coach Erick Mombaerts left the club to return to his native country France. Lachlan Wales was released following the end of his contract, while Aiden O'Neill joined for City's first signing of the season on 8 September.

City signed three youthful players, Taras Gomulka, Marco Tilio and Matt Sutton along with the departure of Gianluca Iannucci on 21 September. Nathaniel Atkinson would then only after 23 days after departing City, had returned within Joshua Brillante leaving two days later. The next day had Andrew Nabbout join City after his short stint with Perth Glory.

Joe Gauci left the club without a single appearance for City and joined Adelaide United on 7 October. The following day, Ramy Najjarine was loaned to Newcastle Jets and Moudi Najjar loaned to Macarthur FC. A week later, Ben Garuccio made a return signing on 16 October.

On 16 November, City played their first friendly of the season, against rivals Melbourne Victory in a game with three 45-minute halves at Marvel Stadium which resulted in a 3–3 draw with a goal by Curtis Good and two from Jamie Maclaren. City returned to the City Football Academy for their second friendly of the season against Western United on 28 November, with a 2–1 win via goals by Andrew Nabbout and Jamie Maclaren.

== Players ==
Note: Flags indicate national team as defined under FIFA eligibility rules; some limited exceptions apply. Players may hold more than one non-FIFA nationality.

No.	Pos.	Nation	Player
1	GK	AUS	Tom Glover
2	DF	AUS	Scott Galloway
3	DF	AUS	Scott Jamieson (captain)
4	DF	POR	Nuno Reis
7	MF	AUS	Rostyn Griffiths
8	MF	AUS	Aiden O'Neill
9	FW	AUS	Jamie Maclaren
10	MF	FRA	Florin Berenguer
11	FW	ENG	Craig Noone
13	DF	AUS	Nathaniel Atkinson
14	MF	JPN	Naoki Tsubaki (on loan from Yokohama F. Marinos)
15	FW	AUS	Andrew Nabbout
16	MF	AUS	Taras Gomulka
17	FW	AUS	Stefan Colakovski

No.	Pos.	Nation	Player
18	MF	AUS	Connor Metcalfe
19	DF	AUS	Ben Garuccio
20	MF	URU	Adrián Luna
22	DF	AUS	Curtis Good
23	FW	AUS	Marco Tilio
33	GK	AUS	Matt Sutton
35	FW	AUS	Raphael Borges Rodrigues (scholarship)
36	DF	AUS	Kerrin Stokes (scholarship)
38	DF	AUS	Jordan Bos (scholarship)
39	MF	AUS	Anthony Lesiotis (scholarship)
42	GK	AUS	Ahmad Taleb (scholarship)
49	FW	AUS	Max Caputo (scholarship)
—	MF	AUS	Idrus Abdulahi (scholarship)
—	GK	AUS	James Nieuwenhuizen (scholarship)

== Transfers ==
=== Transfers in ===
No.	Position	Player	Transferred from	Type/fee	Contract length	Date	Ref
8	MF	Aiden O'Neill	(England) Burnley	Free transfer	3 years	9 September 2020	
16	MF	Taras Gomulka	Adelaide United	Free transfer	3 years	21 September 2020	
23	FW	Marco Tilio	Sydney FC	Free transfer	3 years	21 September 2020	
33	GK	Matt Sutton	Melbourne Victory	Free transfer	2 years	21 September 2020	
13	DF	Nathaniel Atkinson	Perth Glory	Free transfer	2 years	23 September 2020	
15	FW	Andrew Nabbout	Perth Glory	Free transfer	1 year	24 September 2020	
19	DF	Ben Garuccio	Unattached	Free transfer	2 years	16 October 2020	
14	MF	(Japan) Naoki Tsubaki	(Japan) Yokohama F. Marinos	Loan	1 year	5 December 2020	
4	DF	(Portugal) Nuno Reis	(Bulgaria) Levski Sofia	Free transfer	3 years	18 January 2021	
39	MF	Anthony Lesiotis	Unattached	Scholarship	3 months	21 April 2021	
5	DF	(North Macedonia) Daniel Georgievski	Western Sydney Wanderers	Injury replacement	3 months	29 April 2021	

=== Transfers out ===
No.	Position	Player	Transferred to	Type/fee	Date	Ref
17	MF	Denis Genreau	Macarthur FC	Free transfer	28 July 2020	
13	DF	Nathaniel Atkinson	Perth Glory	Free transfer	1 September 2020	
19	FW	Lachlan Wales	Unattached	End of contract	9 September 2020	
37	FW	Gianluca Iannucci	Unattached	End of contract	21 September 2020	
6	MF	Joshua Brillante	(Greece) Xanthi	Mutual contract termination	23 September 2020	
46	GK	Joe Gauci	Adelaide United	End of contract	7 October 2020	
21	FW	Ramy Najjarine	Newcastle Jets	Loan	8 October 2020	
30	FW	Moudi Najjar	Macarthur FC	Loan	8 October 2020	
38	FW	Yaya Dukuly	Adelaide United	Free transfer	27 October 2020	
40	DF	(Austria) Richard Windbichler	Unattached	Mutual contract termination	2 December 2020	
4	DF	Harrison Delbridge	Unattached	End of contract	5 January 2021	
37	MF	Bernardo Oliveira	Adelaide United	Mutual contract termination	13 April 2021	
5	DF	(North Macedonia) Daniel Georgievski	Unattached	End of contract	9 June 2021	

=== From youth squad ===
N	Pos.	Nat.	Name	Age	Notes
38	DF	(Australia)	Jordan Bos	18	1.5 year scholarship contract
42	GK	(Australia)	Ahmad Taleb	18	2 year scholarship contract
49	FW	(Australia)	Max Caputo	15	2 year scholarship contract
	GK	(Australia)	James Nieuwenhuizen	17	3 year scholarship contract

=== Contract extensions ===
No.	Name	Position	Duration	Date	Notes
7	Rostyn Griffiths	Defensive midfielder	2 years	23 September 2020	
10	(France) Florin Berenguer	Attacking midfielder	1 year	23 September 2020	
1	Tom Glover	Goalkeeper	2 years	11 January 2021	
22	Curtis Good	Centre-back	3 years	11 January 2021	
36	Kerrin Stokes	Centre-back	2 years	21 April 2021	
15	Andrew Nabbout	Winger	3 years	10 June 2021	

== Kits ==
Supplier: Puma / Sponsor: Etihad Airways / Sleeve sponsor: McDonald's

Home	Away	Third	Goalkeeper^{1}	Goalkeeper^{2}	Goalkeeper^{3}

== Pre-season and friendlies ==
Win Draw Loss

16 November 2020	Melbourne Victory (Australia)	3–3	(Australia) Melbourne City	Melbourne
	Broxham 6'; Brimmer 81'; Kamsoba 99'	Report	Good 38'; Maclaren (?)	Stadium: Marvel Stadium; Attendance: 0 (behind closed doors)
Note: Match was played with three 45-minute halves.

28 November 2020	Melbourne City (Australia)	2–1	(Australia) Western United	Melbourne
	Nabbout 59'; Maclaren (?)	Report	Pierias (?)	Stadium: City Football Academy; Attendance: 0 (behind closed doors)

5 December 2020	Newcastle Jets (Australia)	3–3	(Australia) Melbourne City	Newcastle
	Topor-Stanley 16'; Abbas 61'; Armson 89'	Report	Griffiths 21'; Maclaren 24' (pen.); Noone 85'	Stadium: McDonald Jones Stadium; Attendance: 0 (behind closed doors)

12 December 2020	Western United (Australia)	2–3	(Australia) Melbourne City	Ballarat
15:00 AEDT	Pain 43'; Stamatelopoulos 78'	Report	Maclaren 7', 71'; O'Neill 17'	Stadium: Morshead Park Stadium

18 December 2020	Bentleigh Greens (Australia)	0–1	(Australia) Melbourne City	Melbourne
20:15 AEDT		Report	Luna 11'	Stadium: Kingston Heath Soccer Complex

== Competitions ==
=== Overview ===
Competition	First match	Last match	Starting round	Final position	Record							
Competition	First match	Last match	Starting round	Final position	Pld	W	D	L	GF	GA	GD	Win %
A-League	29 December 2020	10 June 2021	Matchday 1	Winners	26	15	4	7	57	32	+25	57.69
A-League Finals	20 June 2021	27 June 2021	Semi-finals	Winners	2	2	0	0	5	1	+4	100.00
Total					28	17	4	7	62	33	+29	60.71

Source: Soccerway

=== A-League ===
==== League table ====
Pos	Team	Pld	W	D	L	GF	GA	GD	Pts	Qualification
1	Melbourne City (C)	26	15	4	7	57	32	+25	49	Qualification for 2022 AFC Champions League group stage and finals series (Note: The top two teams entered the finals series at the semi-finals, while the teams ranked third to sixth entered the finals series at the elimination-finals.)
2	Sydney FC	26	13	8	5	39	23	+16	47	Qualification for 2022 AFC Champions League qualifying play-offs and finals series
3	Central Coast Mariners	26	12	6	8	35	31	+4	42	Qualification for finals series
4	Brisbane Roar	26	11	7	8	36	28	+8	40	Qualification for finals series
5	Adelaide United	26	11	6	9	39	41	−2	39	Qualification for finals series

Source: A-Leagues
Rules for classification: 1) Points; 2) Goal difference; 3) Goals scored; 4) Least red cards; 5) Least yellow cards; 6) Toss of a coin in an event of a tie of two clubs.
(C) Champions

==== Results summary ====
Overall								Home						Away					
Pld	W	D	L	GF	GA	GD	Pts	W	D	L	GF	GA	GD	W	D	L	GF	GA	GD
26	15	4	7	57	32	+25	49	10	1	2	36	15	+21	5	3	5	21	17	+4

Source: Ultimate A-League

==== Results by round ====
Round	1	2	3	4	5	6	6	7	8	9	10	11	12	13	14	15	15	16	17	18	19	19	20	21	21	22	22	23	24	24
Ground	A	A	B	A	B	H	A	A	B	H	A	A	H	H	H	A	A	A	H	A	H	A	H	H	H	H	A	B	A	H
Result	W	L	B	W	B	L	L	L	B	W	W	W	W	W	W	L	W	D	W	D	W	W	W	W	D	W	L	B	D	L
Position	1	5	7	5	6	8	8	9	9	9	7	5	4	4	3	2	2	3	1	1	1	1	1	1	1	1	1	1	1	1
Points	3	3	3	6	6	6	6	6	6	9	12	15	18	21	24	24	27	28	31	32	35	38	41	44	45	48	48	48	49	49

Source: Ultimate A-League
A = Away; H = Home; B = Bye; W = Win; D = Draw; L = Loss

==== Matches ====
The league fixtures were announced on 24 November 2020.

Win Draw Loss

29 December 2020 1	Brisbane Roar	0–1	Melbourne City	Brisbane
18:05 AEST		Report	Metcalfe 52'	Stadium: Dolphin Stadium; Attendance: 9,279; Referee: Adam Kersey
Note: Match originally set to play Sydney FC away at ANZ Stadium scheduled for 30 December at 19:00 AEDT, but scrapped due to COVID-19 outbreaks in New South Wales. It was replaced by Brisbane Roar away at Dolphin Stadium rescheduled to 29 December at 18:05 AEST.

3 January 2021 2	Adelaide United	2–0	Melbourne City	Adelaide
17:35 ACDT	Juric 66'; Mauk 76'	Report		Stadium: Coopers Stadium; Attendance: 10,106; Referee: Alireza Faghani
Note: Match originally scheduled for 17:30 ACDT, but rescheduled for 17:35 ACDT.

16 January 2021 4	Melbourne City	2–1	Western United	Melbourne
19:05 AEDT	Noone 32'; Maclaren 84'	Report	Vujica 22'	Stadium: AAMI Park; Attendance: 7,068; Referee: Shaun Evans
Note: Match originally scheduled for 17 January at 18:00 AEDT, but rescheduled due to border closures based on the COVID-19 pandemic in Victoria. It was rescheduled for 16 January at 19:05 AEDT.

31 January 2021 6	Melbourne City	1–3	Perth Glory	Melbourne
18:40 AEDT	Maclaren 33'	Report	Stynes 11'; Ingham 42'; D'Agostino 84'	Stadium: AAMI Park; Attendance: 5,685; Referee: Chris Beath
Note: Match originally scheduled for 28 April at 19:00 AEST, but rescheduled for 31 January at 18:40 AEDT.

3 February 2021 6	Central Coast Mariners	3–2	Melbourne City	Gosford
10:05 AEDT	Casella 41'; Simon 57' (pen.); De Silva 80'	Report	Luna 23'; Maclaren 31'	Stadium: Central Coast Stadium; Attendance: 3,073; Referee: Stephen Lucas
Note: Match originally scheduled for 23 May 16:00 AEST, but rescheduled for 3 February 19:05 AEDT.

7 February 2021 7	Newcastle Jets	1–0	Melbourne City	Newcastle
16:05 AEDT	Yuel 40'	Report		Stadium: McDonald Jones Stadium; Attendance: 4,893; Referee: Alex King
Note: Match originally scheduled for 1 May at 17:00 AEST, but rescheduled for 7 February at 16:05 AEDT.

23 February 2021 9	Melbourne City	3–2	Sydney FC	Melbourne
19:05 AEDT	Maclaren 8', 53'; Luna 28'	Report	Ninković 72'; Wood 90'	Stadium: AAMI Park; Attendance: 3,868; Referee: Stephen Lucas
Note: Match originally scheduled for 15 May at 19:00 AEST, but rescheduled for 16 February at 19:05 AEDT. Match then rescheduled for 23 February.

2 March 2021 10	Western Sydney Wanderers	0–2	Melbourne City	Sydney
19:05 AEDT		Report	Maclaren 6', 54' (pen.)	Stadium: Bankwest Stadium; Attendance: 4,976; Referee: Shaun Evans
Note: Match originally scheduled for 27 March at 19:00 AEDT, but rescheduled for 13 February at 19:10 AEDT. Match then postponed due to Victoria's five-day lockdown based on the COVID-19 pandemic in Victoria. It was rescheduled for 2 March at 19:05 AEDT.

6 March 2021 11	Melbourne Victory	0–6	Melbourne City	Melbourne
19:00 AEDT		Report	Maclaren 34'; Berenguer 52'; Griffiths 56'; Metcalfe 74', 77'; Colakovski 90+3'	Stadium: Marvel Stadium; Attendance: 11,467; Referee: Alireza Faghani
Note: Match originally scheduled for 19:00 AEDT, but rescheduled for 19:10 AEDT.

12 March 2021 12	Melbourne City	3–0	Macarthur FC	Melbourne
19:05 AEDT	Maclaren 23', 25'; Noone 35'	Report		Stadium: AAMI Park; Attendance: 4,884; Referee: Alex King
Note: Match originally scheduled for 19:00 AEDT, but rescheduled for 19:05 AEDT.

22 March 2021 13	Melbourne City	2–0	Central Coast Mariners	Melbourne
19:05 AEDT	Maclaren 31'; Atkinson 56'	Report		Stadium: AAMI Park; Attendance: 4,010; Referee: Chris Beath
Note: Match originally scheduled for 19:00 AEDT, but rescheduled for 19:05 AEDT.

26 March 2021 14	Melbourne City	4–1	Western Sydney Wanderers	Melbourne
19:05 AEDT	Noone 33', 55'; Nabbout 52'; Maclaren 90+2'	Report	Ibini-Isei 21'	Stadium: AAMI Park; Attendance: 5,388; Referee: Alex King
Note: Match originally scheduled for 8 February at 19:00 AEDT, but rescheduled for 26 March at 19:05 AEDT.

1 April 2021 15	Western United	2–1	Melbourne City	Melbourne
17:35 AEDT	Wales 61'; Berisha 66'	Report	Noone 12'	Stadium: AAMI Park; Attendance: 6,104; Referee: Jonathon Barreiro
Note: Match originally scheduled for 13 February at 17:00 AEDT, but rescheduled for 1 April at 17:35 AEDT.

5 April 2021 15	Wellington Phoenix	2–3	Melbourne City	Wollongong
19:10 AEST	Hemed 39'; Davila 56'	Report	Good 17'; Maclaren 45'; Tilio 83'	Stadium: WIN Stadium; Attendance: 1,343; Referee: Alireza Faghani
Note: Match originally scheduled for 22 January at 19:00 AEDT, but postponed due to COVID-19 outbreaks in New South Wales. It was rescheduled for 5 April at 19:10 AEST.

10 April 2021 16	Sydney FC	1–1	Melbourne City	Sydney
17:05 AEST	Barbarouses 54'	Report	Maclaren 90+8'	Stadium: Leichhardt Oval; Attendance: 7,676; Referee: Alex King

17 April 2021 17	Melbourne City	7–0	Melbourne Victory	Melbourne
19:00 AEST	Nabbout 11'; Maclaren 34' (pen.), 64', 75' (pen.), 84', 85'; Luna 87'	Report		Stadium: AAMI Park; Attendance: 14,031; Referee: Chris Beath
Note: Match originally scheduled for 19:00 AEST, but rescheduled for 19:10 AEST.

24 April 2021 18	Macarthur FC	1–1	Melbourne City	Sydney
19:10 AEST	Ruhs 77'	Report	Metcalfe 59'	Stadium: Campbelltown Stadium; Attendance: 3,027; Referee: Shaun Evans
Note: Match originally scheduled for 13 January at 19:00 AEDT, but postponed due to COVID-19 outbreaks in New South Wales. It was rescheduled for 24 April at 19:10 AEST.

29 April 2021 19	Melbourne City	3–1	Newcastle Jets	Melbourne
19:05 AEST	Nabbout 32'; Jamieson 59'; Maclaren 69'	Report	Ugarkovic 87'	Stadium: AAMI Park; Attendance: 4,314; Referee: Stephen Lucas
Note: Match originally scheduled for 8 January at 19:00 AEDT, but postponed due to COVID-19 outbreaks in New South Wales. It was rescheduled for 29 April at 19:05 AEST.

5 May 2021 19	Perth Glory	1–3	Melbourne City	Perth
18:20 AWST	Ikonomidis 31'	Report	Bodnar 36' (o.g.); Maclaren 46', 68'	Stadium: HBF Park; Attendance: 0 (behind closed doors); Referee: Adam Fielding
Note: Match originally scheduled for 4 April at 16:00 AWST, but rescheduled for 20 February at 18:20 AWST. Match then postponed and rescheduled for 5 May.

9 May 2021 20	Melbourne City	3–2	Brisbane Roar	Melbourne
16:05 AEST	Metcalfe 14'; Trewin 17' (o.g.); Galloway 73'	Report	Champness 28'; Gillesphey 38'	Stadium: AAMI Park; Attendance: 4,530; Referee: Shaun Evans
Note: Match originally scheduled for 30 May at 16:00 AEST, but rescheduled for 26 February at 19:05 AEDT. Match then postponed and rescheduled for 9 May at 16:05 AEST.

13 May 2021 21	Melbourne City	4–1	Adelaide United	Melbourne
19:05 AEST	Jamieson 8'; Galloway 45'; Maclaren 72' (pen.), 82'	Report	Halloran 51'	Stadium: AAMI Park; Attendance: 3,370; Referee: Alex King
Note: Match originally scheduled for 9 April at 19:00 AEST, but rescheduled for 13 May at 19:05 AEST.

16 May 2021 21	Melbourne City	2–2	Wellington Phoenix	Melbourne
16:05 AEST	Tsubaki 58'; Maclaren 81'	Report	Hemed 37' (pen.), 88'	Stadium: AAMI Park; Attendance: 4,586; Referee: Alireza Faghani
Note: Match originally scheduled for 28 February at 18:00 AEDT, but rescheduled for 16 May at 16:05 AEST.

22 May 2021 22	Melbourne City	1–0	Central Coast Mariners	Melbourne
19:00 AEDT	Noone 59'	Report		Stadium: AAMI Park; Attendance: 8,124; Referee: Shaun Evans
Note: Match originally scheduled for 3 February at 19:00 AEDT, but postponed due to other fixture arrangements. It was rescheduled for 22 May.

25 May 2021 22	Brisbane Roar	3–0	Melbourne City	Brisbane
19:05 AEST	O'Shea 6' (pen.), 52' (pen.); Parsons 38'	Report		Stadium: Moreton Daily Stadium; Attendance: 3,985; Referee: Alex King
Note: Match originally scheduled for 25 April at 14:00, but rescheduled for 25 May at 19:05 AEST.

6 June 2021 24	Melbourne Victory	1–1	Melbourne City	Melbourne
16:05 AEST	Brooks 90+5'	Report	Ansell 54' (o.g.)	Stadium: AAMI Park; Attendance: 0 (behind closed doors); Referee: Shaun Evans
Note: Match originally scheduled for 7 May at 19:00 AEST, but rescheduled to a later date. It was rescheduled for 6 June at 16:05 AEST. Match originally set to take place at Marvel Stadium, but changed to take place but AAMI Park. Match changed to take place behind closed doors due to Victoria's seven-day lockdown based on the COVID-19 pandemic in Victoria.

10 June 2021 23	Melbourne City	1–2	Newcastle Jets	Melbourne
19:05 AEST	Colakovski 9'	Report	Goodwin 23'; Stamatelopoulos 89'	Stadium: AAMI Park; Attendance: 0 (behind closed doors); Referee: Chris Beath
Note: Match originally scheduled for 21 February at 18:00 AEDT, but rescheduled for 29 May at 17:00 AEST. Match then postponed due to Victoria's seven-day lockdown based on the COVID-19 pandemic in Victoria. It was rescheduled for 10 June at 19:05 AEST and to take place at Netstrata Jubilee Stadium behind closed doors.

=== Finals series ===
20 June 2021 Semi-final	Melbourne City	2–0	Macarthur FC	Sydney
16:05 AEST	Colakovski 54'; Tilio 55'	Report		Stadium: Netstrata Jubilee Stadium; Attendance: 2,283; Referee: Daniel Elder
Note: Match originally scheduled for 18 June, but rescheduled for 20 June. Match then changed to take place behind closed doors in its initial venue of AAMI Park. Match then changed to take place in Netstrata Jubilee Stadium with crowds permitted.

27 June 2021 Grand Final	Melbourne City	3–1	Sydney FC	Melbourne
17:05 AEST	Atkinson 23'; Jamieson 45+1' (pen.); Galloway 90+3'	Report	Barbarouses 21'	Stadium: AAMI Park; Attendance: 14,017; Referee: Chris Beath

=== AFC Champions League ===
==== Qualifying play-offs ====
Win Draw Loss Withdrawn

All three teams from Australia competing in the 2021 AFC Champions League (Sydney FC, Melbourne City and Brisbane Roar) withdrew from the competition after the draw.

7 April 2021 Preliminary round	Melbourne City (Australia)	w/o	(Myanmar) Shan United	Melbourne
		Source		Stadium: Melbourne Rectangular Stadium

21 June 2021 Play-off round	Cerezo Osaka (Japan)	Withdrew	(Australia) Melbourne City	Bangkok, Thailand
		Source

== Statistics ==
=== Appearances and goals ===
Includes all competitions. Players with no appearances not included in the list.

No.	Pos	Nat	Player	Total		A-League		A-League Finals	
No.	Pos	Nat	Player	Apps	Goals	Apps	Goals	Apps	Goals
1	GK	(Australia) AUS	Tom Glover	27	0	25	0	2	0
2	DF	(Australia) AUS	Scott Galloway	21	5	15+4	4	2	1
3	DF	(Australia) AUS	Scott Jamieson	21	3	19	2	2	1
4	DF	(Portugal) POR	Nuno Reis	20	0	13+5	0	2	0
7	DF	(Australia) AUS	Rostyn Griffiths	21	1	18+1	1	2	0
8	MF	(Australia) AUS	Aiden O'Neill	14	0	10+2	0	2	0
9	FW	(Australia) AUS	Jamie Maclaren	24	25	23+1	25	0	0
10	MF	(France) FRA	Florin Berenguer	26	1	17+7	1	2	0
11	MF	(England) ENG	Craig Noone	23	6	22+1	6	0	0
13	DF	(Australia) AUS	Nathaniel Atkinson	14	2	9+3	1	2	1
14	MF	(Japan) JPN	Naoki Tsubaki	15	1	8+7	1	0	0
15	FW	(Australia) AUS	Andrew Nabbout	17	3	15+1	3	0+1	0
16	MF	(Australia) AUS	Taras Gomulka	8	0	3+5	0	0	0
17	FW	(Australia) AUS	Stefan Colakovski	21	3	2+17	2	2	1
18	MF	(Australia) AUS	Connor Metcalfe	24	5	24	5	0	0
19	DF	(Australia) AUS	Ben Garuccio	21	0	9+11	0	0+1	0
20	MF	(Uruguay) URU	Adrián Luna	24	3	16+6	3	2	0
22	DF	(Australia) AUS	Curtis Good	24	1	24	1	0	0
23	FW	(Australia) AUS	Marco Tilio	22	2	8+12	1	2	1
33	GK	(Australia) AUS	Matt Sutton	1	0	1	0	0	0
35	FW	(Australia) AUS	Raphael Borges Rodrigues	4	0	1+2	0	0+1	0
36	FW	(Australia) AUS	Kerrin Stokes	4	0	3+1	0	0	0
39	MF	(Australia) AUS	Anthony Lesiotis	2	0	0+2	0	0	0
43	DF	(Australia) AUS	Alec Mills	3	0	0+3	0	0	0
49	FW	(Australia) AUS	Max Caputo	1	0	0+1	0	0	0
Player(s) transferred out but featured this season
5	DF	(North Macedonia) MKD	Daniel Georgievski	3	0	1+2	0	0	0

- Source: Soccerway

=== Disciplinary record ===
Includes all competitions. The list is sorted by squad number when total cards are equal. Players with no cards not included in the list.

No.	Pos	Nat	Player	Total			A-League			A-League Finals		
No.	Pos	Nat	Player	Yellow card	Second yellow card	Red card	Yellow card	Second yellow card	Red card	Yellow card	Second yellow card	Red card
3	DF	(Australia) AUS	Scott Jamieson	4	1	0	4	1	0	0	0	0
20	MF	(Uruguay) URU	Adrián Luna	2	1	0	2	1	0	0	0	0
36	FW	(Australia) AUS	Kerrin Stokes	1	1	0	1	1	0	0	0	0
8	MF	(Australia) AUS	Aiden O'Neill	6	0	0	5	0	0	1	0	0
10	MF	(France) FRA	Florin Berenguer	6	0	0	5	0	0	1	0	0
18	MF	(Australia) AUS	Connor Metcalfe	4	0	0	4	0	0	0	0	0
7	DF	(Australia) AUS	Rostyn Griffiths	3	0	0	3	0	0	0	0	0
11	MF	(England) ENG	Craig Noone	3	0	0	3	0	0	0	0	0
19	DF	(Australia) AUS	Ben Garuccio	3	0	0	2	0	0	1	0	0
4	DF	(Portugal) POR	Nuno Reis	2	0	0	2	0	0	0	0	0
22	DF	(Australia) AUS	Curtis Good	2	0	0	2	0	0	0	0	0
23	FW	(Australia) AUS	Marco Tilio	2	0	0	1	0	0	1	0	0
43	DF	(Australia) AUS	Alec Mills	2	0	0	2	0	0	0	0	0
2	DF	(Australia) AUS	Scott Galloway	1	0	0	1	0	0	0	0	0
13	DF	(Australia) AUS	Nathaniel Atkinson	1	0	0	1	0	0	0	0	0
15	FW	(Australia) AUS	Andrew Nabbout	1	0	0	1	0	0	0	0	0
17	FW	(Australia) AUS	Stefan Colakovski	1	0	0	0	0	0	1	0	0

- Source: Soccerway
- (yellow card) = Number of bookings; (second yellow card) = Number of sending offs after a second yellow card; (red card) = Number of sending offs by a direct red card.

== Awards ==
=== Melbourne City Player of the Month ===
The winner of the award was chosen via a poll on Twitter.

Month	Player	Votes	Source
December / January	Curtis Good (AUS)	43.6%	
February	Adrián Luna (URU)	48.9%	
March	Andrew Nabbout (AUS)	46.3%	
April	Jamie Maclaren (AUS)	55%	
May	Craig Noone (ENG)	45.8%	
