= 2020–21 Sydney FC season =

Sydney FC
2020–21 season
- Chairman: Scott Barlow
- Manager: Steve Corica
- Stadium: Netstrata Jubilee Stadium; Leichhardt Oval; Stadium Australia
- A-League: 2nd
- A-League Finals: Runners-up
- FFA Cup: Cancelled
- AFC Champions League: Withdrew
- Top goalscorer: League: Bobô (12); All: Bobô (12)
- Highest home attendance: 17,121 (23 May 2021 vs. Western Sydney Wanderers
- Lowest home attendance: 4,226 (19 May 2021 vs. Melbourne Victory
- Average home league attendance: 7,813
Home colours	Away colours	Third colours

The 2020–21 Sydney FC season is the club's 16th season since its establishment in 2004. The club will participate in the A-League for the 16th time. The club will not compete in the 2020 FFA Cup due to the event being cancelled following the COVID-19 pandemic in Australia. The club was scheduled to play in the 2021 AFC Champions League in Uzbekistan from 25 June 2021 to 10 July 2021, but withdrew from the competition on 4 June 2021.

== Players ==
Note: Flags indicate national team as defined under FIFA eligibility rules; some limited exceptions apply. Players may hold more than one non-FIFA nationality.

No.	Pos.	Nation	Player
1	GK	AUS	Andrew Redmayne
2	DF	AUS	Patrick Flottmann
3	DF	AUS	Ben Warland
4	DF	AUS	Alex Wilkinson (captain)
5	MF	GER	Alexander Baumjohann
6	DF	AUS	Ryan McGowan
7	DF	AUS	Michael Zullo
8	MF	AUS	Paulo Retre
9	FW	BRA	Bobô
10	MF	SRB	Miloš Ninković
11	FW	NZL	Kosta Barbarouses
12	FW	AUS	Trent Buhagiar
16	DF	AUS	Joel King

No.	Pos.	Nation	Player
17	MF	AUS	Anthony Cáceres
18	FW	AUS	Luke Ivanovic
19	MF	AUS	Chris Zuvela
20	GK	AUS	Tom Heward-Belle
21	DF	AUS	Harry Van Der Saag
23	DF	AUS	Rhyan Grant
25	DF	AUS	Callum Talbot (Scholarship)
26	MF	AUS	Luke Brattan
27	FW	AUS	Jordan Swibel (Scholarship)
28	MF	AUS	Calem Nieuwenhof (Scholarship)
30	GK	AUS	Adam Pavlesic (Scholarship)
33	FW	AUS	Patrick Wood (Scholarship)
99	FW	ENG	Adam Le Fondre

== Transfers ==
=== Transfers in ===
No.	Position	Name	Transferred from	Type/fee	Contract length	Date	Ref
9	FW	(Brazil) Bobô	Unattached	Free transfer	1 year	1 January 2021	
99	FW	(England) Adam Le Fondre	(India) Mumbai City	End of loan (and new contract)	2.5 years	23 April 2021	
2	DF	Patrick Flottmann	Brisbane Roar	End of loan	(1 month)	10 May 2021	

==== From youth squad ====
N	Pos.	Nat.	Name	Age	Notes
28	MF	(Australia)	Calem Nieuwenhof	19	2 year scholarship contract
30	GK	(Australia)	Adam Pavlesic	18	2 year scholarship contract
29	DF	(Australia)	Anton Mlinaric	18	2 year scholarship contract
25	DF	(Australia)	Callum Talbot	19	2 year scholarship contract
27	FW	(Australia)	Jordan Swibel	21	1 year scholarship contract
33	FW	(Australia)	Patrick Wood	18	2 year scholarship contract

=== Transfers out ===
No.	Position	Player	Transferred to	Type/fee	Date	Ref
24	FW	Marco Tilio	Unattached	End of contract	7 September 2020	
9	FW	(England) Adam Le Fondre	(India) Mumbai City	Loan	7 October 2020	
29	DF	Anton Mlinaric	(Croatia) Dinamo Zagreb	Loan	15 February 2021	
2	DF	Patrick Flottmann	Brisbane Roar	Loan	28 April 2021	

=== Contract extensions ===
No.	Name	Position	Duration	Date	Notes
3	Ben Warland	Centre-back	2 years	5 February 2021	

== Pre-season and friendlies ==
31 October 2020	Sydney FC (Australia)	2–1	(Australia) Macarthur FC
		Report

12 November 2020	Sydney FC (Australia)	3–0	Australia U-23	Sydney, Australia
19:00 AEDT	Retre 5'; Buhagiar 15'; Baumjohann 18'	Report		Stadium: Netstrata Jubilee Stadium

== Competitions ==
Win Draw Loss

=== Overview ===
Competition	First match	Last match	Starting round	Final position	Record							
Competition	First match	Last match	Starting round	Final position	Pld	W	D	L	GF	GA	GD	Win %
A-League	2 January 2021	5 June 2021	Matchday 1	2nd	23	9	7	7	49	38	+11	39.13
A-League Finals	19 June 2021	27 June 2021	Semi-finals	Runners-up	2	1	0	1	3	4	−1	50.00
AFC Champions League	19 November 2020	4 December 2020	Group stage	Group stage	4	1	1	2	6	4	+2	25.00
Total					29	11	8	10	58	46	+12	37.93

Source: Soccerway

=== A-League ===
==== League table ====
Pos	Team	Pld	W	D	L	GF	GA	GD	Pts	Qualification
1	Melbourne City (C)	26	15	4	7	57	32	+25	49	Qualification for 2022 AFC Champions League group stage and finals series (Note: The top two teams entered the finals series at the semi-finals, while the teams ranked third to sixth entered the finals series at the elimination-finals.)
2	Sydney FC	26	13	8	5	39	23	+16	47	Qualification for 2022 AFC Champions League qualifying play-offs and finals series
3	Central Coast Mariners	26	12	6	8	35	31	+4	42	Qualification for finals series
4	Brisbane Roar	26	11	7	8	36	28	+8	40	Qualification for finals series
5	Adelaide United	26	11	6	9	39	41	−2	39	Qualification for finals series

Source: A-Leagues
Rules for classification: 1) Points; 2) Goal difference; 3) Goals scored; 4) Least red cards; 5) Least yellow cards; 6) Toss of a coin in an event of a tie of two clubs.
(C) Champions

==== Matches ====
Win Draw Loss

2 January 2021 2	Wellington Phoenix	1–2	Sydney FC	Wollongong
17:00 AEST	Muratovic 45'	Report	Nieuwenhof 29' Brattan 55'	Stadium: WIN Stadium; Attendance: 3,637; Referee: Alex King

16 January 2021 4	Sydney FC	1–1	Western Sydney Wanderers FC	Sydney
17:00 AEST	Barbarouses 63' (pen.)	Report	Troisi 68'	Stadium: ANZ Stadium; Attendance: 14,402; Referee: Alex King

23 January 2021 5	Sydney FC	0–2	Central Coast Mariners	Sydney
19:05 AEST		Report	Warland 53' (o.g.) Kuol 74'	Stadium: Netstrata Jubilee Stadium; Attendance: 5,320; Referee: Ben Abraham

30 January 2021 7	Macarthur FC	0–3	Sydney FC	Sydney
19:10 AEST		Report	Wood 66', 86'; Ninković 76'	Stadium: Campbelltown Stadium; Referee: Alex King

8 February 2021 17	Sydney FC	2–1	Wellington Phoenix	Sydney
20:00 AEST	Barbarouses 32', 64'	Report	Dávila 90'	Stadium: Netstrata Jubilee Stadium; Attendance: 5,220; Referee: Chris Beath

20 February 2021 21	Sydney FC	0–0	Brisbane Roar FC	Sydney
19:00 AEST		Report		Stadium: Netstrata Jubilee Stadium; Attendance: 5,667; Referee: Chris Beath

23 February 2021 24	Melbourne City FC	3–2	Sydney FC	Melbourne
19:00 AEST	Maclaren 8', 53' Luna 28'	Report	Ninković 72' Wood 90'	Stadium: AAMI Park; Attendance: 3,868; Referee: Stephen Lucas

28 February 2021 20	Sydney FC	0–1	Macarthur FC	Sydney
16:05 AEST		Report	Derbyshire 36'	Stadium: Netstrata Jubilee Stadium; Attendance: 10,158; Referee: Alex King

6 March 2021 12	Brisbane Roar FC	1–1	Sydney FC	Brisbane
17:05 AEST	Wenzel-Halls 18'	Report	Bobô 71'	Stadium: Dolphin Oval; Attendance: 8,562; Referee: Shaun Evans

10 March 2021 23	Sydney FC	2–0	Western United FC	Sydney
19:05 AEST	Bobô 18' (pen.); Grant 47'	Report		Stadium: Netstrata Jubilee Stadium; Attendance: 5,201; Referee: Daniel Elder

13 March 2021 13	Sydney FC	2–1	Newcastle Jets FC	Sydney
17:05 AEST	Ninković 64'; Wilkinson 80'	Report	Prso 21'	Stadium: Netstrata Jubilee Stadium; Attendance: 8,920; Referee: Ben Abraham

24 March 2021 15	Perth Glory	1–1	Sydney FC	Perth
21:20 AEST	Fornaroli 43'	Report	Bobô 63'	Stadium: HBF Park; Attendance: 4,273; Referee: Alireza Faghani

28 March 2021 16	Adelaide United	1–0	Sydney FC	Adelaide
16:40 ACST	Goodwin 76' (pen.)	Report		Stadium: Hindmarsh Stadium; Attendance: 8,451; Referee: Shaun Evans

4 April 2021 6	Melbourne Victory	0–3	Sydney FC	Melbourne
19:05 AEST		Report	Bobô 42'; Barbarouses 50'; Baumjohann 84' (pen.)	Stadium: AAMI Park; Attendance: 5,347; Referee: Daniel Elder

7 April 2021 10	Sydney FC	1–0	Perth Glory	Sydney
19:00 AEST	Barbarouses 54'	Report		Stadium: Netstrata Jubilee Stadium; Attendance: 5,122; Referee: Adam Kersey

10 April 2021 1	Sydney FC	1–1	Melbourne City FC	Sydney
17:00 AEST	Barbarouses 54'	Report	Maclaren 90' (pen.)	Stadium: Leichhardt Oval; Attendance: 7,676; Referee: Alex King

18 April 2021 8	Sydney FC	2–2	Adelaide United	Sydney
19:00 AEST	Bobô 19', 51'	Report	Elsey 75'; Juric 79'	Stadium: Leichhardt Oval; Attendance: 7,718; Referee: Shaun Evans

24 April 2021 19	Central Coast Mariners	2–2	Sydney FC	Gosford
17:00 AEST	Urena 6'; Simon 41'	Report	Ninkovic 45+2'; Buhagiar 83'	Stadium: Central Coast Stadium; Attendance: 10,173; Referee: Chris Beath

27 April 2021 14	Sydney FC	1–0	Melbourne Victory	Sydney
19:35 AEST	Bobô 6'	Report		Stadium: Netstrata Jubilee Stadium; Attendance: 4,816; Referee: Daniel Elder

1 May 2021 9	Western Sydney Wanderers FC	3–2	Sydney FC	Sydney
19:10 AEST	Kamau 12'; Duke 16'; McDonald 74'	Report	Wilkinson 47'; Bobô 90+4'	Stadium: Bankwest Stadium; Attendance: 20,336; Referee: Shaun Evans

8 May 2021 26	Newcastle Jets FC	1–1	Sydney FC	Newcastle
17:05 AEST	O'Donovan 59' (pen.)	Report	Boogaard 76' (o.g.)	Stadium: McDonald Jones Stadium; Attendance: 4,404; Referee: Alex King

15 May 2021 11	Western United FC	0–1	Sydney FC	Ballarat
14:35 AEST		Report	Le Fondre 76' (pen.)	Stadium: MARS Stadium; Attendance: 2,020; Referee: Shaun Evans

19 May 2021 25	Sydney FC	2–0	Melbourne Victory	Sydney
19:05 AEST	Bobô 10'; Barbarouses 83'	Report		Stadium: Jubilee Stadium; Attendance: 4,226; Referee: Alex King

23 May 2021 18	Sydney FC	1–0	Western Sydney Wanderers FC	Sydney
16:05 AEST	Bobô 62'	Report		Stadium: Sydney Cricket Ground; Attendance: 17,121; Referee: Chris Beath

29 May 2021 22	Adelaide United	1–4	Sydney FC	Adelaide
19:10 ACST	Dukuly 89'	Report	Le Fondre 6', 54'; Bobô 58'; Wood 71'	Stadium: Hindmarsh Stadium; Attendance: 8,198; Referee: Daniel Elder

5 June 2021 3	Brisbane Roar FC	0–2	Sydney FC	Brisbane
15:05 AEST		Report	Barbarouses 16'; Van Der Saag 90+5'	Stadium: Dolphin Oval; Attendance: 8,351; Referee: Alireza Faghani

==== Finals series ====
19 June 2021 Semi-final	Sydney FC	2–1	Adelaide United	Sydney
19:05 AEST	Le Fondre 24' (pen.); Bobô 43'	Report	Juande 64'	Stadium: Jubilee Stadium; Referee: Alireza Faghani

27 June 2021 Grand Final	Melbourne City	3–1	Sydney FC	Melbourne
17:05 AEST	Atkinson 23'; Jamieson 45+1' (pen.); Galloway 90+3'	Report	Barbarouses 21'	Stadium: AAMI Park; Attendance: 14,017; Referee: Chris Beath

=== 2020 AFC Champions League ===
Sydney FC were in continuation of their 2020 AFC Champions League campaign from their 2019–20 season.

==== Group stage ====
Pos	Team	Pld	W	D	L	GF	GA	GD	Pts	Qualification
1	(Japan) Yokohama F. Marinos	6	4	1	1	13	5	+8	13	Advance to knockout stage
2	(China) Shanghai SIPG	6	3	0	3	6	10	−4	9	Advance to knockout stage
3	(South Korea) Jeonbuk Hyundai Motors	6	2	1	3	8	10	−2	7	
4	(Australia) Sydney FC	6	1	2	3	8	10	−2	5	

Source: AFC
Rules for classification: Tiebreakers

19 November 2020	Sydney FC (Australia)	1–2	(China) Shanghai SIPG	Doha, Qatar
13:00 UTC+3	Buhagiar 8'	Report	S. Li 63', 79'	Stadium: Khalifa International Stadium; Attendance: 0 Referee: Abdulrahman Al-Jassim (Qatar)

25 November 2020	Jeonbuk Hyundai Motors (South Korea)	1–0	(Australia) Sydney FC	Al Wakrah, Qatar
13:00 UTC+3	Na 44'	Report		Stadium: Al Janoub Stadium; Attendance: 0 Referee: Hettikamkanamge Perera (Sri Lanka)

1 December 2020	Shanghai SIPG (China)	0–4	(Australia) Sydney FC	Al Wakrah, Qatar
16:00 UTC+3		Report	Wilkinson 28'; Brattan 33'; Buhagiar 57', 60'	Stadium: Al Janoub Stadium; Attendance: 0 Referee: Turki Al-Khudhayr (Saudi Arabia)

4 December 2020	Sydney FC (Australia)	1–1	(Japan) Yokohama F. Marinos	Al Wakrah, Qatar
13:00 UTC+3	Buhagiar 29'	Report	Saneto 18'	Stadium: Al Janoub Stadium; Attendance: 0 Referee: Saoud Al-Athbah (Qatar)

=== 2021 AFC Champions League ===
All three teams from Australia competing in the 2021 AFC Champions League (Sydney FC, Melbourne City and Brisbane Roar) withdrew from the competition after the draw.

== Statistics ==
=== Appearances and goals ===
Includes all competitions. Players with no appearances not included in the list.

No.	Pos	Nat	Player	Total		A-League		A-League Finals		2020 AFC Champions League	
No.	Pos	Nat	Player	Apps	Goals	Apps	Goals	Apps	Goals	Apps	Goals
1	GK	(Australia) AUS	Andrew Redmayne	25	0	25	0	0	0	0	0
2	DF	(Australia) AUS	Patrick Flottmann	3	0	0	0	0	0	1+2	0
3	DF	(Australia) AUS	Ben Warland	15	0	5+5	0	2	0	3	0
4	DF	(Australia) AUS	Alex Wilkinson	32	3	26	2	2	0	4	1
5	MF	(Germany) GER	Alexander Baumjohann	31	1	10+15	1	2	0	3+1	0
6	DF	(Australia) AUS	Ryan McGowan	22	0	21+1	0	0	0	0	0
7	DF	(Australia) AUS	Michael Zullo	3	0	0+1	0	0	0	2	0
8	MF	(Australia) AUS	Paulo Retre	27	0	18+5	0	2	0	2	0
9	FW	(Brazil) BRA	Bobô	23	12	17+4	11	2	1	0	0
10	MF	(Serbia) SRB	Miloš Ninković	30	4	22+4	4	0+1	0	3	0
11	FW	(New Zealand) NZL	Kosta Barbarouses	31	9	25	8	2	1	3+1	0
12	FW	(Australia) AUS	Trent Buhagiar	15	5	5+6	1	0	0	4	4
16	DF	(Australia) AUS	Joel King	31	0	26	0	2	0	2+1	0
17	MF	(Australia) AUS	Anthony Caceres	31	0	22+4	0	2	0	2+1	0
18	FW	(Australia) AUS	Luke Ivanovic	17	0	2+11	0	0	0	1+3	0
19	MF	(Australia) AUS	Chris Zuvela	6	0	0+3	0	0	0	0+3	0
20	GK	(Australia) AUS	Tom Heward-Belle	6	0	1	0	2	0	2+1	0
21	DF	(Australia) AUS	Harry Van Der Saag	14	1	2+8	1	0+2	0	0+2	0
23	DF	(Australia) AUS	Rhyan Grant	27	1	23	1	0	0	4	0
25	DF	(Australia) AUS	Callum Talbot	1	0	0+1	0	0	0	0	0
26	MF	(Australia) AUS	Luke Brattan	28	2	23+1	1	2	0	2	1
27	FW	(Australia) AUS	Jordan Swibel	10	0	0+8	0	0	0	0+2	0
28	MF	(Australia) AUS	Calem Nieuwenhof	13	1	5+4	1	0	0	4	0
30	GK	(Australia) AUS	Adam Pavlesic	2	0	0	0	0	0	2	0
33	FW	(Australia) AUS	Patrick Wood	22	4	4+15	4	0+2	0	0+1	0
99	FW	(England) ENG	Adam Le Fondre	7	4	4+1	3	2	1	0	0

- Source: Soccerway

=== Disciplinary record ===
Includes all competitions. The list is sorted by squad number when total cards are equal. Players with no cards not included in the list.

No.	Pos	Nat	Player	Total			A-League			A-League Finals			2020 AFC Champions League		
No.	Pos	Nat	Player	Yellow card	Second yellow card	Red card	Yellow card	Second yellow card	Red card	Yellow card	Second yellow card	Red card	Yellow card	Second yellow card	Red card
8	MF	(Australia) AUS	Paulo Retre	6	0	1	6	0	1	0	0	0	0	0	0
23	DF	(Australia) AUS	Rhyan Grant	5	0	1	5	0	1	0	0	0	0	0	0
20	GK	(Australia) AUS	Tom Heward-Belle	0	0	1	0	0	0	0	0	0	0	0	1
26	MF	(Australia) AUS	Luke Brattan	8	1	0	7	0	0	1	1	0	0	0	0
6	DF	(Australia) AUS	Ryan McGowan	6	0	0	6	0	0	0	0	0	0	0	0
11	FW	(New Zealand) NZL	Kosta Barbarouses	5	0	0	5	0	0	0	0	0	0	0	0
5	MF	(Germany) GER	Alexander Baumjohann	3	0	0	2	0	0	0	0	0	1	0	0
21	DF	(Australia) AUS	Harry Van Der Saag	3	0	0	2	0	0	0	0	0	1	0	0
3	DF	(Australia) AUS	Ben Warland	2	0	0	2	0	0	0	0	0	0	0	0
4	DF	(Australia) AUS	Alex Wilkinson	2	0	0	2	0	0	0	0	0	0	0	0
17	MF	(Australia) AUS	Anthony Caceres	2	0	0	2	0	0	0	0	0	0	0	0
28	MF	(Australia) AUS	Calem Nieuwenhof	2	0	0	2	0	0	0	0	0	0	0	0
33	FW	(Australia) AUS	Patrick Wood	2	0	0	2	0	0	0	0	0	0	0	0
10	MF	(Serbia) SRB	Miloš Ninković	1	0	0	1	0	0	0	0	0	0	0	0
12	FW	(Australia) AUS	Trent Buhagiar	1	0	0	1	0	0	0	0	0	0	0	0
18	FW	(Australia) AUS	Luke Ivanovic	1	0	0	1	0	0	0	0	0	0	0	0
19	MF	(Australia) AUS	Chris Zuvela	1	0	0	0	0	0	0	0	0	1	0	0

- Source: Soccerway
- (yellow card) = Number of bookings; (second yellow card) = Number of sending offs after a second yellow card; (red card) = Number of sending offs by a direct red card.
