= Macarthur FC league record by opponent =

Macarthur Football Club is an Australian professional association football club based in South Western Sydney. The club was formed in 2017 as Macarthur South West United before it was renamed to Macarthur FC in 2019.

Macarthur FC's first team have competed in the A-League Men. Their record against each club faced in the A-League is listed below. Macarthur FC's first A-League Men match was against Western Sydney Wanderers, and they have met 11 different league opponents in the 2020–21 A-League season. The team that Macarthur FC have played most in league competition is Central Coast Mariners; the 5 defeats from 9 meetings is more than they have lost against any other club. Western United have drawn 3 league encounters with Macarthur FC, more than any other club. Macarthur FC have recorded more league victories against Perth Glory than against any other club, having beaten them 4 times.

== Key ==
- The table includes results of matches played by Macarthur FC in the A-League Men regular season and Finals series.
- The name used for each opponent is the name they had when Macarthur FC most recently played a league match against them. Results against each opponent include results against that club under any former name.
- The columns headed "First" and "Last" contain the first and most recent seasons in which Macarthur FC played league matches against each opponent.
- P = matches played; W = matches won; D = matches drawn; L = matches lost; Win% = percentage of total matches won.
- ‡ Clubs with this background and symbol in the "Opponent" column are defunct.

== All-time league record ==
Statistics correct as of matches played on 28 January 2023.

Macarthur FC league record by opponent
Club	P	W	D	L	P	W	D	L	P	W	D	L	Win%	First	Last	Notes
Club	Home				Away				Total				Win%	First	Last	Notes
Adelaide United	3	3	0	0	3	0	0	3	6	3	0	3	50.00	2020–21	2022–23	
Brisbane Roar	2	1	0	1	3	1	1	1	5	2	1	2	40.00	2020–21	2022–23	
Central Coast Mariners	4	1	0	3	5	2	1	2	9	3	1	5	33.33	2020–21	2022–23	
Melbourne City	2	0	1	1	3	0	0	3	5	0	1	4	0.00	2020–21	2021–22	
Melbourne Victory	3	1	0	2	2	1	0	1	5	2	0	3	40.00	2020–21	2022–23	
Newcastle Jets	4	2	1	1	2	1	1	0	6	3	2	1	50.00	2020–21	2022–23	
Perth Glory	3	3	0	0	3	1	2	0	6	4	2	0	66.67	2020–21	2022–23	
Sydney FC	3	0	0	3	4	3	1	0	7	3	1	3	42.86	2020–21	2022–23	
Wellington Phoenix	3	0	2	1	3	1	0	2	6	1	2	3	16.67	2020–21	2022–23	
Western Sydney Wanderers	3	1	2	0	3	2	0	1	6	3	2	1	50.00	2020–21	2022–23	
Western United	3	1	2	0	4	1	1	2	7	2	3	2	28.57	2020–21	2022–23	
