= Naoki Tsubaki =

Japanese footballer (born 2000)

Naoki Tsubaki 椿 直起
Personal information
- Full name: Naoki Tsubaki
- Date of birth: June 23, 2000 (age 26)
- Place of birth: Tokyo, Japan
- Height: 1.72 m (5 ft 7 1/2 in)
- Position: Winger

Team information
- Current team: JEF United Chiba
- Number: 14

Youth career
- Yokogawa Musashino
- 2016–2018: Yokohama F. Marinos

Senior career*
Years	Team	Apps	(Gls)
2019–2022	Yokohama F. Marinos	0	(0)
2019–2021	→ Giravanz Kitakyushu (loan)	50	(2)
2020–2021	→ Melbourne City (loan)	15	(1)
2022	→ Mito HollyHock (loan)	37	(3)
2023–	JEF United Chiba	88	(11)
- * Club domestic league appearances and goals as of 12 August 2026

Naoki Tsubaki (椿 直起, Tsubaki Naoki; born 23 June 2000) is a Japanese professional footballer who plays as a winger for J1 League club JEF United Chiba.

== Career ==
After spending three years with Yokohama F. Marinos on a type 2 contract while finishing high school, Tsubaki signed his first professional contract ahead of the 2019 season. He debuted for the Tricolore as a second-half substitute in a 4-0 win away to Hokkaido Consadole Sapporo in the J.League Cup on 8 May 2019.

Tsubaki has been transferred to Giravanz Kitakyushu in the J3 League on 15 August 2019 on loan. After Kitakyushu have become the champions of the 2019 J3 League, then have been promoted to the 2020 J2 League, Tsubaki's loan term to Kitakyushu has been extended to another season. After playing 34 matches with 2 goals out of 37 in the season, Tsubaki was transferred back to Yokohama as of the end of November 2020, then was transferred immediately to Melbourne City FC, the 2019-20 A-League runners-up, on loan as of 1 December 2020. Following the conclusion of the 2020-21 A-League season, in which Melbourne City won the premiership and championship, Tsubaki departed Melbourne City and returned to Yokohama.

After a loan to J2 League club Mito Hollyhock for the 2022 season, it was announced in December 2022 that Tsubaki would be leaving Yokohama F. Marinos on a permanent basis and joining JEF United Chiba for the 2023 season.

== Career statistics ==
As of start of 2023 season

Appearances and goals by club, season and competition
Club	Season	League			National Cup (Note: Includes Emperor's Cup)		League Cup (Note: Includes J. League Cup)		Total	
Club	Season	Division	Apps	Goals	Apps	Goals	Apps	Goals	Apps	Goals
Yokohama F. Marinos	2019	J1 League	0	0	0	0	2	0	2	0
Giravanz Kitakyushu (loan)	2019	J3 League	5	0	0	0	—		5	0
Giravanz Kitakyushu (loan)	2020	J2 League	34	2	0	0	—		34	2
Giravanz Kitakyushu (loan)	2021	J2 League	11	0	0	0	—		11	0
Giravanz Kitakyushu (loan)	Total		50	2	0	0	0	0	50	2
Melbourne City (loan)	2020–21	A-League	15	1	—		—		15	1
Mito Hollyhock (loan)	2022	J2 League	37	3	1	0	—		38	3
JEF United Chiba	2023	J2 League	0	0	0	0	—		0	0
Career total			102	7	1	0	2	0	105	7

== Honours ==
Giravanz Kitakyushu

- J3 League : 2019

Melbourne City

- A-League : 2020–21 Championship and Premiership
