= Riku Danzaki =

Japanese footballer (born 2000)

Riku Danzaki 檀崎 竜孔
Personal information
- Full name: Riku Danzaki
- Date of birth: 31 May 2000 (age 26)
- Place of birth: Natori, Miyagi, Japan
- Height: 5 ft 9 in (1.74 m)
- Position: Attacking midfielder

Youth career
- 2013–2015: Aomori Yamada Junior High School
- 2016–2018: Aomori Yamada High School

Senior career*
Years	Team	Apps	(Gls)
2019–2023	Hokkaido Consadole Sapporo	3	(0)
2020–2021	→ Brisbane Roar (loan)	25	(9)
2021	→ JEF United Chiba (loan)	4	(0)
2022–2023	→ Brisbane Roar (loan)	12	(0)
2023	Motherwell	3	(0)
2023–2025	Western United	49	(6)
- * Club domestic league appearances and goals as of 9 July 2025 ‡ National team caps and goals as of 31 May 2023,2:20 (UTC)

Riku Danzaki (檀崎 竜孔, Danzaki Riku; born 31 May 2000) is a Japanese professional footballer who plays as an attacking midfielder.

== Club career ==
=== Early career ===
Born in Natori, Miyagi, Japan, Danzaki began playing football at Tatekoshi SSS and Avanzare Sendai SC before joining Vegalta Sendai Junior, where he proved to be a standout player. Although Danzaki was expected to be promoted to the Vegalta Sendai Junior team, he opted to join Aomori Yamada High School in Aomori and progressed both junior high and high school at Aomori between 2015 and 2018. In his first year at Aomori Yamada, Danzaki helped the school win the National Junior High School Soccer Tournament Final in 2015. Together with teammates KennedyEgbus Mikuni, they were one of the key players to win the Outstanding Player Award of the tournament. In 2016, Danzaki helped Aomori Yamada win both the National High School Soccer Championship (and was also named MVP of the tournament) and Prince Takamado Trophy Championship.

In 2017, Danzaki helped Aomori Yamada win the Championship Aomori Prefecture Preliminary Finals. Throughout 2017, Danzaki performance at Aomori Yamada was noticed by Web Gekisaka, who described him one of the players to watch. He was also included for the National High School Soccer Championship Outstanding Player.

In 2018, Danzaki was appointed as captain for the Aomori Yamada and finished the season as the top scorer in the Prince Takamado Trophy Premier League. Under his leadership at Aomori Yamada, he helped the school win Sanix Cup International Youth Tournament and National High School Soccer Championship Final. Following this, Danzaki was included for the National High School Soccer Championship Outstanding Player for the second time in a row.

=== Hokkaido Consadole Sapporo ===
It was announced on 18 September 2018 that Danzaki joined J-League club, Hokkaido Consadole Sapporo. He had an unsuccessful trial at Cerezo Osaka and acknowledged his fault of a "lackluster performance" as a reason for not getting a contract.

On 12 January 2019, Danzaki was given the number 17 jersey previously worn by Junichi Inamoto. On March 6 of the same year, he made his professional debut in a first round J.League Cup fixture against Yokohama F. Marinos. On 10 April 2019, Danzaki scored his first professional goal against Shonan Bellmare in a later J-League cup fixture. However, he suffered ankle injury that sidelined him for the rest of the 2019 season. At the end of the 2019 season, Danzaki made eleven appearances and scoring once in all competitions

Ahead of the 2020 season, Danzaki signed a contract extension with the club. However, he appeared sporadically and made three appearances for Consadole Sapporo. After being away from Consadole Sapporo for two years, Danzaki signed another contract extension with the club. He made his first appearance for the club, in a 2–2 draw against Sagan Tosu in the J.League Cup on 23 February 2022. Danzaki appeared six more times later in the 2022 season, playing in the J.League Cup and Emperor's Cup. On 7 January 2023, it was announced that Danzaki would be departing Consadole Sapporo after his contract expired.

==== First loan spell to Brisbane Roar ====
On 19 November 2020, Danzaki joined Australian A-League club Brisbane Roar on a loan deal for the 2020–21 A-League season.

He made his debut for the club, starting the whole game, in a 1–0 loss against Melbourne City in the opening game of the season. Three weeks later on 20 January 2021, Danzaki scored his first goal for Brisbane Roar in round three against Newcastle Jets. Two weeks later on 6 February 2021, he scored a brace and set up the opening goal of the game, in a 5–2 win against Melbourne Victory Since joining the club, Danzaki became a first team regular for Brisbane Roar, playing in the attacking midfield position. He later scored three goals in three consecutive matches between 3 April 2021 and 16 April 2021, including twice against Western Sydney Wanderers on two separate occasions. Over the course of the season, Danzaki scored nine goals and was top-scorer for the club. However, Danzaki played once in the league Finals series after losing 2–1 against Adelaide United on 13 June 2021.

For his performance, he was awarded the Golden Boot and A-League Goal of the Season for his goal against Western United. Despite manager Warren Moon planned on keeping Danzaki, it was announced that he would be returning to his parent club.

==== Loan to JEF United Chiba ====
On 12 August 2021, it was announced that Danzaki had joined J2 club JEF United Chiba on loan for the 2021 season.

He made his debut for the club, coming on as a late substitute, in a 0–0 draw against Albirex Niigata on 14 August 2021. However, Danzaki found his playing time from the substitute bench and made three more appearances at the end of the 2021 season. On 30 December 2021, it was announced by Consadole Sapporo that he would be returning to his parent club ahead of the 2022 season.

==== Second loan spell to Brisbane Roar ====
On 9 July 2022, Danzaki returned to Australian A-League club Brisbane Roar on a loan deal for the 2022–23 season. Upon re-joining the club, he said: "I really need to bring in the result. I want to show my gratitude to the club by bringing in the result. A-League gave me back the confidence."

Danzaki made his second debut for Brisbane Roar against Heidelberg United in the round of 32 of Australian Cup. He later scored two more goals in the Australian Cup against Avondale FC and Sydney United 58, where the club reached the semi–finals. However, Danzaki struggled to replicate his form that he previously did in his first loan spell at Brisbane Roar and returned to his parent club and made nine appearances and scoring two times in all competitions.

=== Motherwell ===
On 28 January 2023, Scottish Premiership club Motherwell announced the signing of Danzaki as a free agent. The attacking midfielder signed on a contract until the summer of 2025.

He made his debut for the club, starting the match and played 60 minutes before being substituted, in a 2–1 loss against St Johnstone on 2 February 2023. However, Danzaki struggled to get playing, leading to manager Stuart Kettlewell say that he needs time to settle in Scotland if he wants to get first team football at Motherwell. At the end of the 2022–23 season, Danzaki made four appearances for the club.

Ahead of the 2023–24 season, manager Stuart Kettlewell was critical of Danzaki's progress on his fitness and settling in the country, believing that he hasn't done enough to earn his place in the first team. On 11 July 2023, Danzaki left Motherwell despite having two years left to his contract. Manager Stuart Kettlewell commented on his departure, saying: "Without divulging too much, it's not [a loss]. We've been working away on a situation where Riku has another opportunity elsewhere, and it's not been at a cost, other than the contract that was there initially and that weekly wage. That was a situation where Riku could see what was happening here, his representatives the exact same, and we came to an agreement where he would move on."

=== Western United ===
On 24 July 2023, Danzaki returned to Australia by joining Western United on a free transfer.

He made his debut for the club against Edgeworth FC in the round of 32 of Australian Cup and set up a goal for Lachlan Wales, who scored twice, in a 4–0 win. However, Danzaki suffered a shoulder injury, which he sustained during a 2–0 loss against Newcastle Jets on 30 December 2023. On 23 February 2024, Danzaki made his return from injury as a substitute and set up Western United's second goal of the game, in a 2–2 draw against Brisbane Roar. Following his return from injury, he regained his first team place, playing in the winger position. On 6 April 2024, Danzaki scored Western United FC's first ever goal at the Wyndham Regional Football Facility, scoring in the 52nd minute in an eventual 4–2 win over Macarthur. On 21 April 2024, he scored his second goal for the club, in a 4–3 win against Perth Glory. At the end of the 2023–24 season, Danzaki made twenty-three appearances and scoring two times in all competitions.

In the Western United's first match of the 2024–25 season, Danzaki scored the club's first goal of the season, in a 4–1 loss against Newcastle Jets in the qualifying round of the Australian Cup.

On 4 July 2025, Western United confirmed the departure of Danzaki following the expiry of his contract.

== Spot-fixing ==
In May 2025, Danzaki was charged with spot-fixing related crimes by Victoria Police, with police alleging he had manipulated red or yellow card betting markets in four A League matches in April and May 2025.

In August 2025, Danzaki admitted to accepting $16,000 to deliberately receive yellow cards in three A League matches in April and May 2025. He would be fined $5000 and convicted of spot-fixing related crimes. Additionally he would receive a seven year ban by Football Australia, preventing him from playing within the country until 2032.

== International career ==
Danzaki represented the Japan levels from U15 to U18. In August 2018, he participated in the SBS Cup for Japan U18 side, where they finished as runners-up.

== Personal life ==
Growing up in Natori, Miyagi, Japan, Danzaki was the only child of the family. He previously stated his determination to make it as a professional footballer and received a support from his parents.

On 21 July 2021, Danzaki announced his marriage to a general woman. Since moving to Australia, he has been taking English lessons.

== Club statistics ==
As of match played 5 March 2023

Appearances and goals by club, season and competition
Club	Season	League			National cup (Note: Including Emperor's Cup, Australia Cup and Scottish Cup)		League cup (Note: Including J.League Cup)		Other (Note: Including A-League finals)		Total	
Club	Season	Division	Apps	Goals	Apps	Goals	Apps	Goals	Apps	Goals	Apps	Goals
Hokkaido Consadole Sapporo	2019	J1 League	2	0	0	0	8	1	–		10	1
Hokkaido Consadole Sapporo	2020	J1 League	1	0	0	0	2	0	–		3	0
Hokkaido Consadole Sapporo	2021	J1 League	0	0	0	0	0	0	–		0	0
Hokkaido Consadole Sapporo	2022	J1 League	0	0	2	0	5	0	–		7	0
Hokkaido Consadole Sapporo	Total		3	0	2	0	15	1	0	0	20	1
Brisbane Roar (loan)	2020–21	A-League	25	9	0	0	–		1	0	26	9
JEF United Chiba (loan)	2021	J2 League	4	0	0	0	–		–		4	0
Brisbane Roar (loan)	2022–23	A-League Men	12	0	4	2	–		–		16	2
Motherwell	2022–23	Scottish Premiership	3	0	1	0	0	0	0	0	4	0
Career total			47	9	7	2	15	1	1	0	70	12
