= 2020–21 A-League =

44th season of top-tier soccer league in Australia

A-League
- Season: 2020–21
- Dates: 28 December 2020 – 27 June 2021
- Champions: Melbourne City (1st title)
- Premiers: Melbourne City (1st title)
- Champions League: Melbourne City; Sydney FC
- Matches: 161
- Goals: 471 (2.93 per match)
- Top goalscorer: Jamie Maclaren (25 goals)
- Biggest home win: Melbourne City 7–0 Melbourne Victory (17 April 2021)
- Biggest away win: Melbourne Victory 0–6 Melbourne City (6 March 2021)
- Highest scoring: Western United 5–4 Perth Glory (23 January 2021); Melbourne Victory 5–4 WSW (23 April 2021)
- Longest winning run: 6 matches Adelaide United; Melbourne City
- Longest unbeaten run: 11 matches Wellington Phoenix
- Longest winless run: 14 matches Newcastle Jets
- Longest losing run: 8 matches Western United
- Highest attendance: 24,105; WEL 3–0 WUN (22 May 2021)
- Lowest attendance: 550; WUN 1–2 MAC (31 May 2021)
- Total attendance: 879,039
- Average attendance: 5,745 ( 3,683)
- (Note: Longest run statistics do not include finals)

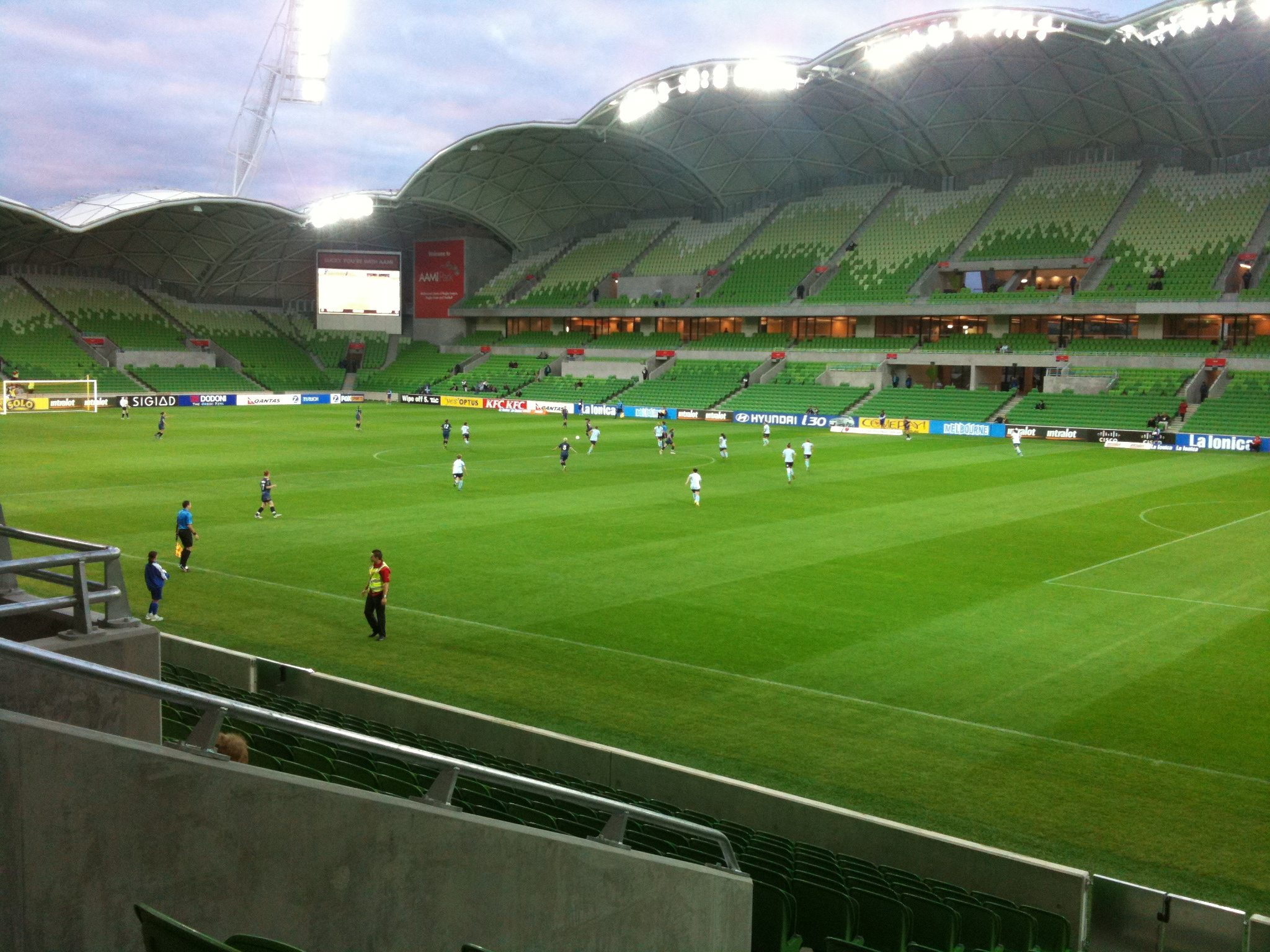
Melbourne Rectangular Stadium interior

The 2020–21 A-League was the 44th season of national level soccer in Australia, and the 16th since the establishment of the A-League in 2004. The season was started on 28 December 2020 and concluded with the Grand Final on 27 June 2021. The start of the season was later than previous seasons as a result of both the COVID-19 pandemic in Australia and New Zealand. Wellington Phoenix played the majority of their home matches at Wollongong Showground in Wollongong due to international travel restrictions.

Sydney FC were the defending champions and premiers, having won their record fifth and fourth titles respectively the previous season. Melbourne City won their first premiership and championship title, leaving Sydney FC in second on both.

== Clubs ==

There were 12 clubs participating in this season. Macarthur FC made their A-League debut this season.

Club	City	Home stadium(s)	Capacity
Adelaide United	Adelaide	Coopers Stadium	16,500
Brisbane Roar	Brisbane	Moreton Daily Stadium	11,500
Central Coast Mariners	Gosford	Central Coast Stadium	20,059
Macarthur FC	Sydney	Campbelltown Stadium	20,000
Melbourne City	Melbourne	AAMI Park	30,050
Melbourne Victory	Melbourne	Marvel Stadium	56,347
Melbourne Victory	Melbourne	AAMI Park	30,050
Newcastle Jets	Newcastle	McDonald Jones Stadium	33,000
Newcastle Jets	Coffs Harbour	C.ex Coffs International Stadium	20,000
Perth Glory	Perth	HBF Park	20,500
Sydney FC	Sydney	Stadium Australia	83,500
Sydney FC	Sydney	Sydney Cricket Ground	48,601
Sydney FC	Sydney	Netstrata Jubilee Stadium	20,500
Sydney FC	Sydney	Leichhardt Oval	20,000
Wellington Phoenix	Auckland	Eden Park	50,000
Wellington Phoenix	Wellington	Sky Stadium	34,500
Wellington Phoenix	Newcastle	McDonald Jones Stadium	33,000
Wellington Phoenix	Wollongong	WIN Stadium	23,000
Western Sydney Wanderers	Sydney	Bankwest Stadium	30,000
Western United	Geelong	GMHBA Stadium	26,000 (Note: The stadium will be undergoing construction during the season, which will reduce the stadium's capacity to around 26,000. The stadium will have a capacity of 40,000 once construction is complete.)
Western United	Melbourne	AAMI Park	30,050
Western United	Launceston	UTAS Stadium	19,000
Western United	Ballarat	Mars Stadium	11,000

=== Personnel and kits ===
Team	Manager	Captain	Kit manufacturer	Kit sponsor
Adelaide United	(Australia) Carl Veart	(Australia) Stefan Mauk	UCAN	Flinders University; Australian Outdoor Living
Brisbane Roar	(Australia) Warren Moon	(Scotland) Tom Aldred	Umbro	ActronAir
Central Coast Mariners	(Australia) Alen Stajcic	(Australia) Oliver Bozanic	Umbro	Masterfoods; MATE
Macarthur FC	(Australia) Ante Milicic	(Australia) Mark Milligan	Macron	Wisdom Homes
Melbourne City	(Australia) Patrick Kisnorbo	(Australia) Scott Jamieson	Puma	Etihad Airways
Melbourne Victory	(Scotland) Steve Kean (caretaker)	(Australia) Leigh Broxham	Adidas	Metricon
Newcastle Jets	(Australia) Craig Deans	(Australia) Nigel Boogaard	Apelle	Inspirations Paint
Perth Glory	(Australia) Richard Garcia	(Spain) Diego Castro	Macron	BHP
Sydney FC	(Australia) Steve Corica	(Australia) Alex Wilkinson	Under Armour	The Star
Wellington Phoenix	(Australia) Ufuk Talay	(Mexico) Ulises Dávila	Paladin Sports	KPMG; Multi Civil and Rail
Western Sydney Wanderers	(Wales) Carl Robinson	(Australia) Dylan McGowan	Kappa	Voltaren; JD Sports
Western United	(Australia) Marko Rudan	(Italy) Alessandro Diamanti	Kappa	Simonds Homes; Tasman Logistics

Away kit.

=== Managerial changes ===
Team	Outgoing manager	Manner of departure	Date of vacancy	Position on table	Incoming manager	Date of appointment
Macarthur FC	Inaugural manager			Pre-season	(Australia) Ante Milicic	15 May 2019
Melbourne Victory	(Scotland) Grant Brebner (caretaker)	Promoted to full time	24 August 2020	Pre-season	(Scotland) Grant Brebner	24 August 2020
Perth Glory	(Australia) Tony Popovic	Signed by Xanthi	27 August 2020	Pre-season	(Australia) Hayden Foxe (caretaker)	2 September 2020
Melbourne City	(France) Erick Mombaerts	Resigned	3 September 2020	Pre-season	(Australia) Patrick Kisnorbo	3 September 2020
Adelaide United	(Australia) Carl Veart (caretaker)	Promoted to full time	18 September 2020	Pre-season	(Australia) Carl Veart	18 September 2020
Perth Glory	(Australia) Hayden Foxe (caretaker)	End of contract	18 September 2020	Pre-season	(Australia) Richard Garcia	18 September 2020
Western Sydney Wanderers	(Australia) Jean-Paul de Marigny	Sacked	12 October 2020	Pre-season	(Wales) Carl Robinson	15 October 2020
Newcastle Jets	(Wales) Carl Robinson	Signed by Western Sydney Wanderers	15 October 2020	Pre-season	(Australia) Craig Deans (Note: Deans was initially appointed as interim coach, but the move was made permanent on 10 February 2021.)	16 October 2020
Melbourne Victory	(Scotland) Grant Brebner	Sacked	17 April 2021	12th	(Scotland) Steve Kean (caretaker)	19 April 2021

=== Foreign players ===
Club	Visa 1	Visa 2	Visa 3	Visa 4	Visa 5	Non-visa foreigner(s)	Former player(s)
Adelaide United	(Denmark) Michael Jakobsen	(Spain) Juande	(Spain) Javi López			(Burundi) Pacifique Niyongabire^{2}	
Brisbane Roar	(England) Macaulay Gillesphey	(Republic of Ireland) Jay O'Shea	(Japan) Riku Danzaki	(Japan) Masato Kudo	(Scotland) Tom Aldred	(England) Jamie Young^{2} (New Zealand) Joe Champness^{2} (Sri Lanka) Jack Hingert^{2}	(New Zealand) Jai Ingham^{2}
Central Coast Mariners	(Costa Rica) Marco Ureña	(Poland) Michał Janota	(Serbia) Stefan Janković			(Fiji) Dan Hall^{2} (New Zealand) Gianni Stensness^{2}	
Macarthur FC	(England) Matt Derbyshire	(France) Loïc Puyo	(Spain) Beñat	(Spain) Markel Susaeta		(Cyprus) Antonis Martis^{2}	
Melbourne City	(England) Craig Noone	(France) Florin Berenguer	(Japan) Naoki Tsubaki	(Portugal) Nuno Reis	(Uruguay) Adrián Luna	(North Macedonia) Stefan Colakovski^{2}	(North Macedonia) Daniel Georgievski^{2}
Melbourne Victory	(Benin) Rudy Gestede	(England) Jacob Butterfield	(England) Callum McManaman	(New Zealand) Marco Rojas		(Burundi) Elvis Kamsoba^{2} (Ivory Coast) Adama Traoré^{1} (New Zealand) Max Crocombe^{2} (New Zealand) Storm Roux^{2}	(England) Ryan Shotton
Newcastle Jets						(Iraq) Ali Abbas^{1} (Republic of Ireland) Roy O'Donovan^{1} (South Sudan) Valentino Yuel^{2}	(Indonesia) Syahrian Abimanyu (Malaysia) Liridon Krasniqi
Perth Glory	(Curaçao) Darryl Lachman	(Germany) Sebastian Langkamp	(Japan) Kosuke Ota	(Spain) Diego Castro	(Uruguay) Bruno Fornaroli	(Republic of Ireland) Andy Keogh^{1} (New Zealand) Dane Ingham^{2}	
Sydney FC	(Brazil) Bobô	(England) Adam Le Fondre	(Germany) Alexander Baumjohann	(New Zealand) Kosta Barbarouses	(Serbia) Miloš Ninković		
Wellington Phoenix	(England) David Ball	(England) Steven Taylor	(Israel) Tomer Hemed	(Mexico) Ulises Dávila			
Western Sydney Wanderers	(England) Jordon Mutch	(Germany) Nicolai Müller	(Scotland) Graham Dorrans	(Scotland) Ziggy Gordon		(Germany) Patrick Ziegler^{1}	(Republic of Ireland) Simon Cox (North Macedonia) Daniel Georgievski^{2}
Western United	(Italy) Alessandro Diamanti	(Japan) Tomoki Imai	(Poland) Filip Kurto	(Spain) Iker Guarrotxena	(Spain) Víctor Sánchez	(England) Kaine Sheppard^{1} (Kosovo) Besart Berisha^{1} (New Zealand) Andrew Durante^{2}	

The following do not fill a Visa position:
^{1}Those players who were born and started their professional career abroad but have since gained Australian citizenship (or New Zealand citizenship, in the case of Wellington Phoenix);
^{2}Australian citizens (or New Zealand citizens, in the case of Wellington Phoenix) who have chosen to represent another national team;
^{3}Injury replacement players, or National team replacement players;
^{4}Guest players (eligible to play a maximum of fourteen games)

=== Salary cap exemptions and captains ===
Club	First Designated	Second Designated	Captain	Vice-Captain
Adelaide United	None	None	(Australia) Stefan Mauk	(Australia) Jordan Elsey (Australia) Ben Halloran
Brisbane Roar	None	None	(Scotland) Tom Aldred	None
Central Coast Mariners	(Australia) Daniel De Silva	None	(Australia) Oliver Bozanic	None
Macarthur FC	(Australia) Mark Milligan	None	(Australia) Mark Milligan	None
Melbourne City	(Australia) Jamie Maclaren	None	(Australia) Scott Jamieson	None
Melbourne Victory	(Australia) Robbie Kruse	None	(Australia) Leigh Broxham	None
Newcastle Jets	None	None	(Australia) Nigel Boogaard	(Australia) Nikolai Topor-Stanley
Perth Glory	(Spain) Diego Castro	(Uruguay) Bruno Fornaroli	(Spain) Diego Castro	(Australia) Neil Kilkenny
Sydney FC	None	None	(Australia) Alex Wilkinson	None
Wellington Phoenix	(Israel) Tomer Hemed	None	(Mexico) Ulises Dávila	(New Zealand) Alex Rufer
Western Sydney Wanderers	None	None	(Australia) Dylan McGowan	None
Western United	(Italy) Alessandro Diamanti	None	(Italy) Alessandro Diamanti	(Australia) Tomislav Uskok

== Regular season ==
The regular season commenced on 28 December 2020 and ended on 10 June 2021.

=== League table ===
Pos	Team	Pld	W	D	L	GF	GA	GD	Pts	Qualification
1	Melbourne City (C)	26	15	4	7	57	32	+25	49	Qualification for 2022 AFC Champions League group stage and finals series (Note: The top two teams entered the finals series at the semi-finals, while the teams ranked third to sixth entered the finals series at the elimination-finals.)
2	Sydney FC	26	13	8	5	39	23	+16	47	Qualification for 2022 AFC Champions League qualifying play-offs and finals series
3	Central Coast Mariners	26	12	6	8	35	31	+4	42	Qualification for finals series
4	Brisbane Roar	26	11	7	8	36	28	+8	40	Qualification for finals series
5	Adelaide United	26	11	6	9	39	41	−2	39	Qualification for finals series
6	Macarthur FC	26	11	6	9	33	36	−3	39	Qualification for finals series
7	Wellington Phoenix (Note: Wellington Phoenix cannot qualify for Asian Football Confederation competitions as they are based in New Zealand, which is under the Oceania Football Confederation.)	26	10	8	8	44	34	+10	38	
8	Western Sydney Wanderers	26	9	8	9	45	43	+2	35	
9	Perth Glory	26	9	7	10	44	44	0	34	Qualification for 2021 FFA Cup play-offs (Note: The top 8 teams qualified for the round of 32, while the bottom four teams participated in a playoff round.)
10	Western United	26	8	4	14	30	47	−17	28	Qualification for 2021 FFA Cup play-offs
11	Newcastle Jets	26	5	6	15	24	38	−14	21	Qualification for 2021 FFA Cup play-offs
12	Melbourne Victory	26	5	4	17	31	60	−29	19	Qualification for 2022 AFC Champions League qualifying play-offs and 2021 FFA Cup play-offs (Note: Qualified as the 2021 FFA Cup winners.)

Source: A-Leagues
Rules for classification: 1) Points; 2) Goal difference; 3) Goals scored; 4) Least red cards; 5) Least yellow cards; 6) Toss of a coin in an event of a tie of two clubs.
(C) Champions

=== Fixtures and results ===
Home \ Away	ADE	BRI	CCM	MAC	MCY	MVC	NEW	PER	SYD	WEL	WSW	WUN	ADE	BRI	CCM	MAC	MCY	MVC	NEW	PER	SYD	WEL	WSW	WUN
Adelaide United		1–0	3–2	3–1	2–0	1–0	2–1	1–2	1–0	0–0	1–1	0–0									1–4		2–2	
Brisbane Roar	3–1		0–0	0–2	0–1	5–2	0–0	2–1	1–1	0–0	1–1	2–1					3–0				0–2			
Central Coast Mariners	2–1	0–4		2–0	3–2	1–1	1–0	2–2	2–2	1–2	0–1	3–2							0–2					2–0
Macarthur FC	4–0	1–2	0–2		1–1	3–1	2–2	2–0	0–3	1–1	2–2	2–1			1–2							0–3		
Melbourne City	4–1	3–2	2–0	3–0		7–0	3–1	1–3	3–2	2–2	4–1	2–1			1–0				1–2					
Melbourne Victory	1–3	1–3	1–1	1–2	0–6		0–1	2–1	0–3	2–0	5–4	3–4	0–1				1–1							
Newcastle Jets	1–4	1–2	0–1	1–2	1–0	1–2		1–1	1–1	0–2	1–2	0–1		1–2						1–1				
Perth Glory	5–3	3–1	1–2	0–0	1–3	2–1	2–1		1–1	1–3	5–1	3–0	2–1			1–1								
Sydney FC	2–2	0–0	0–2	0–1	1–1	1–0	2–1	1–0		2–1	1–1	2–0						2–0					1–0	
Wellington Phoenix	2–1	1–1	0–2	0–1	2–3	4–1	1–2	3–0	1–2		2–2	3–2								2–2				3–0
Western Sydney Wanderers	2–3	1–2	2–2	0–1	0–2	2–0	1–1	3–0	3–2	4–3		5–0		2–0								1–2		
Western United	0–0	1–0	1–0	4–1	2–1	0–0	2–0	5–4	0–1	1–1	0–1					1–2		1–6						

Source: A-League
Legend: Blue = home team win; Yellow = draw; Red = away team win.
For upcoming matches, an "a" indicates there is an article about the rivalry between the two participants.

== Finals series ==
Elimination-finals
12 June – Gosford
Central Coast Mariners	0
Macarthur FC	2
13 June – Brisbane
Brisbane Roar	1
Adelaide United	2

Semi-finals
20 June – Sydney
Melbourne City	2
Macarthur FC	0
19 June – Sydney
Sydney FC	2
Adelaide United	1

Grand Final
27 June – Melbourne
Melbourne City	3
Sydney FC	1

=== Elimination-finals ===
12 June 2021
19:05 AEST

Central Coast Mariners	0–2 (a.e.t.)	Macarthur FC
	Report	M'Mombwa 93'; Ruhs 120+1'

Central Coast Stadium, Gosford
Attendance: 11,565
Referee: Shaun Evans
13 June 2021
15:05 AEST

Brisbane Roar	1–2	Adelaide United
Parsons 56'	Report	Juric 15', 19'

Dolphin Stadium, Brisbane
Attendance: 7,782
Referee: Alex King

=== Semi-finals ===
19 June 2021
19:05 AEST

Sydney FC	2–1	Adelaide United
Le Fondre 24' (pen.); Bobô 43'	Report	Juande 64'

Netstrata Jubilee Stadium, Sydney
Attendance: 7,500
Referee: Alireza Faghani
20 June 2021
16:05 AEST

Melbourne City	2–0	Macarthur FC
Colakovski 54'; Tilio 55'	Report

Netstrata Jubilee Stadium, Sydney
Attendance: 2,283
Referee: Daniel Elder

=== Grand Final ===
27 June 2021
17:05 AEST

Melbourne City	3–1	Sydney FC
Atkinson 23'; Jamieson 45+1' (pen.); Galloway 90+3'	Report	Barbarouses 21'

AAMI Park, Melbourne
Attendance: 14,017
Referee: Chris Beath

== Statistics ==
=== Top scorers ===
Including Finals matches

Rank	Player	Club	Goals
1	(Australia) Jamie Maclaren	Melbourne City	25
2	(England) Matt Derbyshire	Macarthur FC	14
3	(Uruguay) Bruno Fornaroli	Perth Glory	13
4	(Brazil) Bobô	Sydney FC	12
5	(Israel) Tomer Hemed	Wellington Phoenix	11
6	(Australia) Matt Simon	Central Coast Mariners	10
7	(New Zealand) Kosta Barbarouses	Sydney FC	9
7	(Japan) Riku Danzaki	Brisbane Roar	9
7	(Australia) Tomi Juric	Adelaide United	9
7	(Australia) Bruce Kamau	Western Sydney Wanderers	9

=== Hat-tricks ===
Player	For	Against	Result	Date	Ref.
(England) Matt Derbyshire	Macarthur FC	Adelaide United	4–0 (H)	12 February 2021	
(Australia) Tomi Juric	Adelaide United	Central Coast Mariners	3–2 (H)	19 February 2021	
(Australia) Jamie Maclaren^{5}	Melbourne City	Melbourne Victory	7–0 (H)	17 April 2021	
(Republic of Ireland) Andy Keogh^{4}	Perth Glory	Western Sydney Wanderers	5–1 (H)	16 May 2021	

Key
^{4}	Player scored four goals
^{5}	Player scored five goals
(H)	Home team

== Awards ==
=== Annual awards ===
The following end of the season awards were announced at the 2020–21 Dolan Warren Awards night on 23 June 2021.

- Johnny Warren Medal – Ulises Dávila, Wellington Phoenix & Miloš Ninković, Sydney FC
- NAB Young Footballer of the Year – Joel King, Sydney FC
- Nike Golden Boot Award – Jamie Maclaren, Melbourne City (25 goals)
- Goalkeeper of the Year – Mark Birighitti, Central Coast Mariners & Andrew Redmayne, Sydney FC
- Coach of the Year – Patrick Kisnorbo, Melbourne City
- Fair Play Award – Brisbane Roar
- Referee of the Year – Chris Beath
- Goal of the Year – Andy Keogh, Perth Glory (Perth Glory v Western Sydney Wanderers, 16 May 2021)

=== Team of the season ===
Team of the season
Goalkeeper	(Australia) Adam Federici (Macarthur FC)						
Defenders	(Australia) Rhyan Grant (Sydney FC)	(Australia) Ruon Tongyik (Central Coast Mariners)		(Australia) Curtis Good (Melbourne City)			(Australia) Scott Jamieson (Melbourne City)
Midfielders	(Australia) Oliver Bozanic (Central Coast Mariners)		(Mexico) Ulises Dávila (Wellington Phoenix)			(Australia) Connor Metcalfe (Melbourne City)	
Forwards	(England) Matt Derbyshire (Macarthur FC)		(Australia) Jamie Maclaren (Melbourne City)			(England) Craig Noone (Melbourne City)	
Substitutes	(Australia) Mark Birighitti (Central Coast Mariners)	(Australia) Ryan Strain (Adelaide United)	(Australia) Luke Brattan (Sydney FC)	(Australia) Matt Simon (Central Coast Mariners)	(Australia) Ryan McGowan (Sydney FC)	(Serbia) Miloš Ninković (Sydney FC)	(Republic of Ireland) Jay O'Shea (Brisbane Roar)

== See also ==
- 2020–21 Adelaide United FC season
- 2020–21 Brisbane Roar FC season
- 2020–21 Central Coast Mariners FC season
- 2020–21 Macarthur FC season
- 2020–21 Melbourne City FC season
- 2020–21 Melbourne Victory FC season
- 2020–21 Newcastle Jets FC season
- 2020–21 Perth Glory FC season
- 2020–21 Sydney FC season
- 2020–21 Wellington Phoenix FC season
- 2020–21 Western Sydney Wanderers FC season
- 2020–21 Western United FC season
