= Alec Mills (soccer) =

Australian professional soccer player

Personal information
- Full name: Alec Campbell Mills
- Date of birth: 24 February 2001 (age 25)
- Place of birth: Wooragee, Australia
- Position: Defender

Team information
- Current team: St Albans Saints

Youth career
- Goulburn Valley Suns
- 2015–2018: Murray United

Senior career*
Years	Team	Apps	(Gls)
2018	Murray United	10	(0)
2019–2021	Melbourne City NPL	23	(0)
2021	Melbourne City	3	(0)
2022	Brisbane Roar NPL	10	(1)
2022	Brisbane Roar	0	(0)
2023	Bentleigh Greens	23	(0)
2024	Preston Lions	17	(0)
2025–	St Albans Saints	0	(0)

International career^{‡}
2019	Australia U20	5	(0)
Medal record
Men's football
Representing Australia
AFF U-19 Youth Championship
First place	2019 Vietnam	U-20 Team
- * Club domestic league appearances and goals as of 17 August 2024 ‡ National team caps and goals as of 19 August 2019

Alec Campbell Mills (born 24 February 2001), is an Australian professional footballer who plays as a defender for Brisbane Roar NPL. Mills hails from Wooragee in Victoria's north-east, playing for NPL side Murray United as a junior before being recruited by Melbourne City.

== Club career ==
=== Melbourne City ===
Mills started playing in Melbourne City's youth selections with under-20s and reserve team including the Y-League squad for the 2019–20 Y-League season. On 3 February 2021, Mills made his debut in the A-League, against the Central Coast Mariners as a substitute replacing Florin Berenguer in a 3–2 loss.

== Career statistics ==
=== Club ===
As of match played 1 April 2021

Club	Season	League			National Cup		Asia		Other		Total	
Club	Season	Division	Apps	Goals	Apps	Goals	Apps	Goals	Apps	Goals	Apps	Goals
Murray United	2018	NPL Victoria 2	11	0	0	0	—		0	0	11	0
Melbourne City NPL	2019	NPL Victoria 2	17	0	—		—		0	0	17	0
Melbourne City NPL	2021	NPL Victoria 3	1	0	—		—		0	0	1	0
Melbourne City NPL	Total		18	0	0	0	0	0	0	0	18	0
Melbourne City	2020–21	A-League	1	0	—		0	0	—		1	0
Career total			30	0	0	0	0	0	0	0	30	0

=== International ===
As of match played 19 August 2019.

Appearances and goals by national team, year and competition
Team	Year	Competitive		Friendly		Total	
Team	Year	Apps	Goals	Apps	Goals	Apps	Goals
Australia U20	2019	5 (Note: Appearances in the 2019 AFF U-18 Youth Championship)	0	0	0	5	0

== Honours ==
=== International ===
Australia U20

- AFF U-19 Youth Championship: 2019
