= 2021 A-League finals series =

A-League finals series
- Season: 2020–21
- Dates: 12–27 June 2021
- Champions: Melbourne City
- Matches: 5
- Goals: 14 (2.8 per match)
- Top goalscorer: Tomi Juric (2 goals)
- Biggest home win: Melbourne City 2–0 Macarthur FC (Semi-finals, 20 June 2021); Melbourne City 3–1 Sydney FC (Grand Final, 27 June 2021)
- Biggest away win: Central Coast Mariners 0–2 Macarthur FC (Elimination-finals, 12 June 2021)
- Highest scoring: Melbourne City 3–1 Sydney FC (Grand Final, 27 June 2021)
- Highest attendance: 14,017; Melbourne City 3–1 Sydney FC (Grand Final, 27 June 2021)
- Lowest attendance: 2,283; Melbourne City 2–0 Macarthur FC (Semi-finals, 20 June 2021)
- Total attendance: 43,147
- Average attendance: 8,629

The 2021 A-League finals series was the 16th annual edition of the A-League finals series, the playoffs tournament staged to determine the champion of the 2020–21 A-League season. The series was played over three weeks culminating in the 2021 A-League Grand Final, where premiers Melbourne City won their first championship 3–1 against reigning champions Sydney FC.

The series dates were extended due to the COVID-19 restrictions in Victoria.

== Qualification ==
Melbourne City and Sydney FC finished in the top two spots to automatically qualify for the semi-finals. Central Coast Mariners qualified for the finals series for the first time since 2014 and Macarthur FC were confirmed their finals qualification in their inaugural season. Brisbane Roar sealed their finals spot after defeating Perth Glory 2–1 to rule them out of the finals series, leaving one spot remaining. Adelaide United became the last to finish in the top six and qualify for the finals series after a 2–2 draw with the Western Sydney Wanderers.

Pos	Team	Pld	W	D	L	GF	GA	GD	Pts	Qualification
1	Melbourne City (C)	26	15	4	7	57	32	+25	49	Qualification for 2022 AFC Champions League group stage and finals series (Note: The top two teams entered the finals series at the semi-finals, while the teams ranked third to sixth entered the finals series at the elimination-finals.)
2	Sydney FC	26	13	8	5	39	23	+16	47	Qualification for 2022 AFC Champions League qualifying play-offs and finals series
3	Central Coast Mariners	26	12	6	8	35	31	+4	42	Qualification for finals series
4	Brisbane Roar	26	11	7	8	36	28	+8	40	Qualification for finals series
5	Adelaide United	26	11	6	9	39	41	−2	39	Qualification for finals series
6	Macarthur FC	26	11	6	9	33	36	−3	39	Qualification for finals series
7	Wellington Phoenix (Note: Wellington Phoenix cannot qualify for Asian Football Confederation competitions as they are based in New Zealand, which is under the Oceania Football Confederation.)	26	10	8	8	44	34	+10	38	
8	Western Sydney Wanderers	26	9	8	9	45	43	+2	35	
9	Perth Glory	26	9	7	10	44	44	0	34	Qualification for 2021 FFA Cup play-offs (Note: The top 8 teams qualified for the round of 32, while the bottom four teams participated in a playoff round.)
10	Western United	26	8	4	14	30	47	−17	28	Qualification for 2021 FFA Cup play-offs
11	Newcastle Jets	26	5	6	15	24	38	−14	21	Qualification for 2021 FFA Cup play-offs
12	Melbourne Victory	26	5	4	17	31	60	−29	19	Qualification for 2022 AFC Champions League qualifying play-offs and 2021 FFA Cup play-offs (Note: Qualified as the 2021 FFA Cup winners.)

Source: A-Leagues
Rules for classification: 1) Points; 2) Goal difference; 3) Goals scored; 4) Least red cards; 5) Least yellow cards; 6) Toss of a coin in an event of a tie of two clubs.
(C) Champions

== Venues ==
Melbourne	2021 A-League finals series is located in Australia	Sydney
AAMI Park	2021 A-League finals series is located in Australia	Netstrata Jubilee Stadium
Capacity: 30,050	2021 A-League finals series is located in Australia	Capacity: 20,500
Gosford	2021 A-League finals series is located in Australia	Brisbane
Industree Group Stadium	2021 A-League finals series is located in Australia	Dolphin Stadium
Capacity: 20,059	2021 A-League finals series is located in Australia	Capacity: 10,000

== Bracket ==
The system used for the 2021 A-League finals series is the modified top-six play-offs by the A-Leagues. The top two teams enter the two-legged semi-finals receiving the bye for the elimination-finals in which the teams from third placed to sixth place enter the elimination-finals with "third against sixth" and "fourth against fifth". Losers for the elimination-finals are eliminated, and winners qualify for the semi-finals.

First placed team in the semi-finals plays the lowest ranked elimination-final winning team and second placed team in the semi-finals plays the highest ranked elimination-final winner. Home-state advantage goes to the team with the higher ladder position.

Elimination-finals
12 June – Gosford
Central Coast Mariners	0
Macarthur FC	2
13 June – Brisbane
Brisbane Roar	1
Adelaide United	2

Semi-finals
20 June – Sydney
Melbourne City	2
Macarthur FC	0
19 June – Sydney
Sydney FC	2
Adelaide United	1

Grand Final
27 June – Melbourne
Melbourne City	3
Sydney FC	1

== Matches ==
=== Elimination-finals ===
Third-placed Central Coast Mariners qualified for the finals series for the first time since 2014 to set up a home elimination-final against inaugural sixth-placed Macarthur FC. No goals were scored in the full 90 minutes, as the match was sent to extra time and ten-man Macarthur scoring two goals by Charles M'Mombwa and Michael Ruhs to win the match 2–0 and send them through to the semi-final against Melbourne City.

12 June 2021
19:05 AEST

Central Coast Mariners	0–2 (a.e.t.)	Macarthur FC
	Report	M'Mombwa 93'; Ruhs 120+1'

Central Coast Stadium, Gosford
Attendance: 11,565
Referee: Shaun Evans

Fourth-placed Brisbane Roar; an undefeated side in hosting finals at home went up against fifth-placed Adelaide United who returned to the finals series after missing out in the previous season. Tomi Juric scored two quick-fire goals in the first half and despite a goal back by Alex Parsons for Brisbane, Adelaide United won 2–1 to qualify for the semi-final against Sydney FC.

13 June 2021
15:05 AEST

Brisbane Roar	1–2	Adelaide United
Parsons 56'	Report	Juric 15', 19'

Dolphin Stadium, Brisbane
Attendance: 7,782
Referee: Alex King

=== Semi-finals ===
Sydney FC and Adelaide United met in the semi-finals at Netstrata Jubilee Stadium. Sydney held the advantage with two goals up at half time through Adam Le Fondre and Bobô. Adelaide in the second half scored one in the second half, but the match resulted in Sydney FC qualifying for the Grand Final for the third consecutive time.

19 June 2021
19:05 AEST

Sydney FC	2–1	Adelaide United
Le Fondre 24' (pen.); Bobô 43'	Report	Juande 64'

Netstrata Jubilee Stadium, Sydney
Attendance: 7,500
Referee: Alireza Faghani

Initially set to be played at AAMI Park, this semi-final between Melbourne City and Macarthur FC was relocated at Netstrata Jubilee Stadium in response to COVID-19 restrictions in Melbourne. Melbourne City successfully booked their spot in the Grand Final, after winning 2–0 against Macarthur thanks to quick-fire goals by Stefan Colakovski and Marco Tilio to qualify for their first home Grand Final.

20 June 2021
16:05 AEST

Melbourne City	2–0	Macarthur FC
Colakovski 54'; Tilio 55'	Report

Netstrata Jubilee Stadium, Sydney
Attendance: 2,283
Referee: Daniel Elder

=== Grand Final ===
The 2021 Grand Final was the first rematch of two teams from the previous edition, of Melbourne City and Sydney FC. City won the host of this grand final; this being their first home Grand Final, played at AAMI Park. The capacity was limited to 50% due to COVID-19 restrictions in Melbourne, as all match tickets were sold out for a crowd of almost 15,000. Melbourne City were looking for their first Grand Final success, while Sydney FC were on the verge of three consecutive A-League championships. Sydney opened the scoring through Kosta Barbarouses, until City immediately responded with an equalising goal by Nathaniel Atkinson. City were awarded a penalty which was converted by captain Scott Jamieson towards the end of the first half. Scott Galloway capitalised the match with a third goal to win the match 3–1 for City, winning their first A-League championship.

27 June 2021
17:05 AEST

Melbourne City	3–1	Sydney FC
Atkinson 23'; Jamieson 45+1' (pen.); Galloway 90+3'	Report	Barbarouses 21'

AAMI Park, Melbourne
Attendance: 14,017
Referee: Chris Beath
