= Alex Parsons (soccer, born 2000) =

Australian soccer player

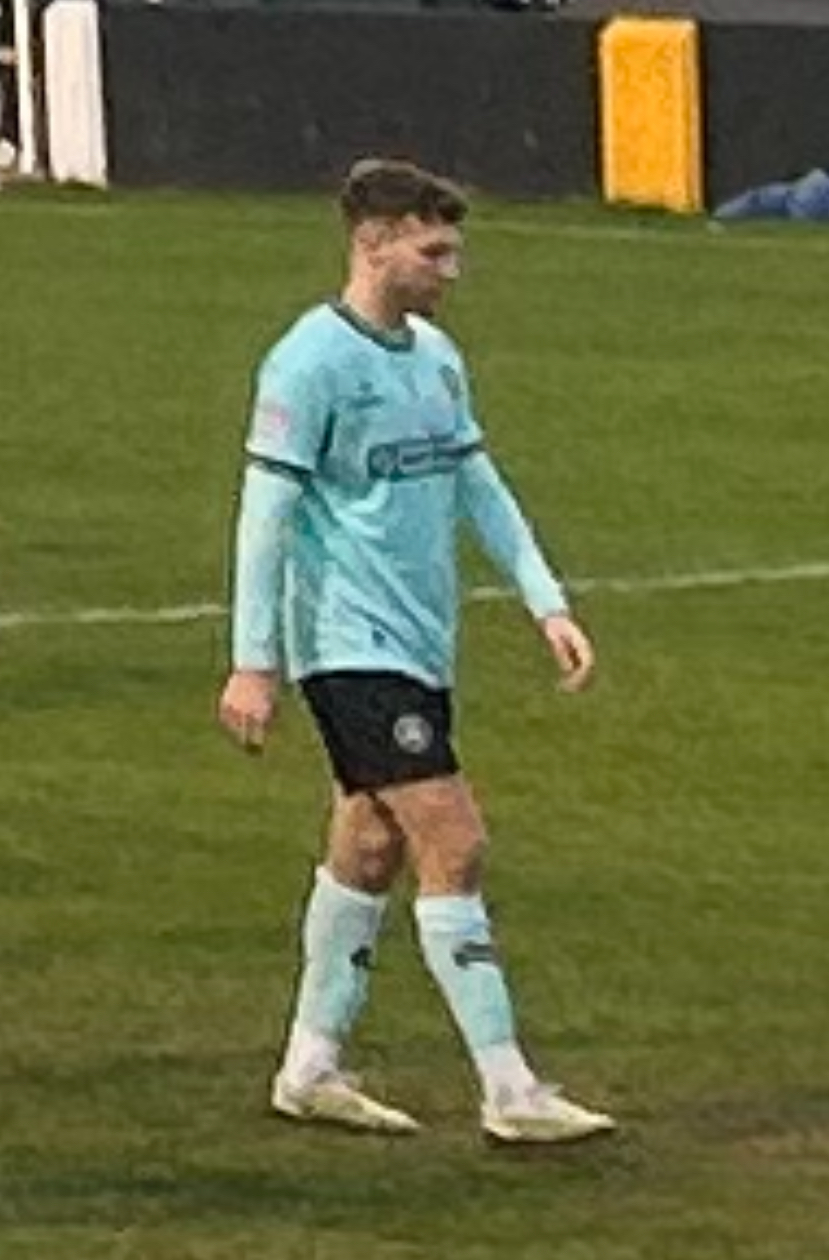
- Parsons with Cliftonville in 2025

Personal information
- Full name: Alexander Parsons
- Date of birth: 6 January 2000 (age 26)
- Place of birth: Ipswich, Australia
- Positions: Winger; striker

Youth career
- 2005–2011: Western Spirit
- 2012: Queensland Lions
- 2013–2014: Olympic FC
- 2015–2016: QAS NTC
- 2019–2020: CCM Academy

Senior career*
Years	Team	Apps	(Gls)
2017–2019	Western Pride	38	(14)
2020–2022	Brisbane Roar NPL	26	(11)
2020–2022	Brisbane Roar	28	(5)
2022–2023	Sydney FC	8	(1)
2023–2025	Brisbane Roar	11	(0)
2025	Cliftonville	14	(3)
- * Club domestic league appearances and goals as of 12 January 2026

Alex Parsons (born 6 January 2000) is an Australian professional soccer player who last played as a forward for Cliftonville.

== Club career ==
=== Youth career ===
Parsons played his youth career at Western Spirit before joining the Queensland Academy of Sport.

=== Western Pride ===
Parsons joined Western Pride in 2017, scoring regularly for the under-20 side, and making his senior debut late in the season.

=== Brisbane Roar ===
Parsons joined Central Coast Mariners for the 2019–20 Y-League season. He left to join Brisbane Roar's NPL Queensland side for the 2020 season.

Parsons made his professional debut on 29 December 2020 against Melbourne City, coming on as a substitute for his former Western Pride clubmate Dylan Wenzel-Halls.

After two seasons in which he made 32 appearances in all competitions, Parsons left the club in May 2022 at the conclusion of his contract.

=== Sydney FC ===
In August 2022, Parsons signed a two-year contract with Sydney FC.

=== Return to Brisbane Roar ===
In July 2023, Parsons returned to Brisbane Roar.

=== Cliftonville ===
In February 2025, Cliftonville announced the signing of Parsons.

== Honours ==
Cliftonville

- Irish League Cup: 2024–25
